= 2022 ATP Tour =

Men's tennis circuit

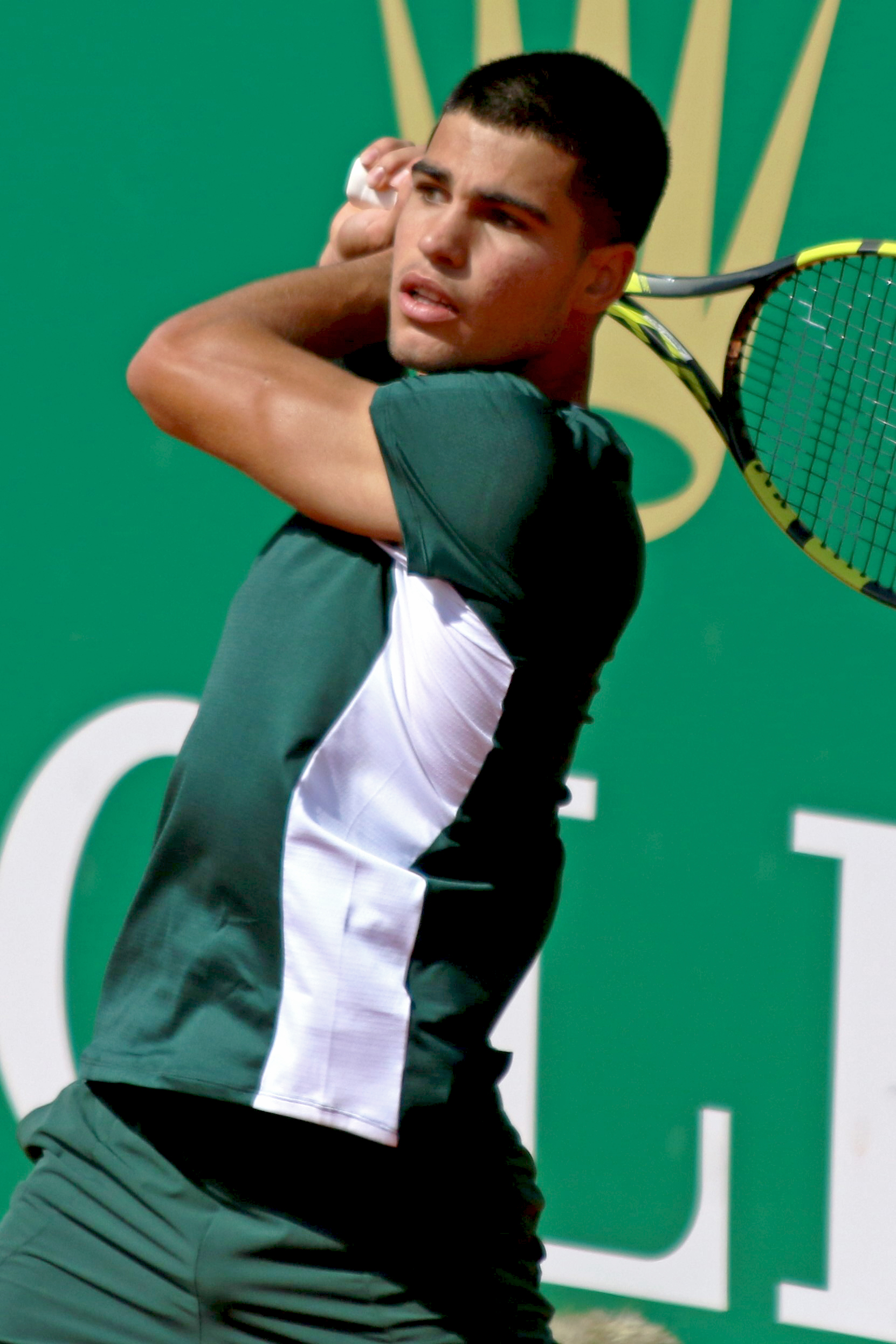
- Carlos Alcaraz finished the year as world No. 1 for the first time in his career, becoming the youngest man to do so. He won five tournaments during the season, including a major at the US Open. He also won two Masters 1000 events.

Details
- Duration: 1 Jan 2022 – 28 Nov 2022
- Edition: 53rd
- Tournaments: 72
- Categories: Grand Slam (4); ATP Finals; ATP Masters 1000 (8); ATP Cup; ATP 500 (13); ATP 250 (42); Next Generation finals Davis Cup; Laver Cup

Achievements (singles)
- Most titles: (Spain) Carlos Alcaraz; (Serbia) Novak Djokovic; (5)
- Most finals: (Spain) Carlos Alcaraz; (Serbia) Novak Djokovic; (Norway) Casper Ruud; (Greece) Stefanos Tsitsipas; (7)
- Prize money leader: (Spain) Carlos Alcaraz ($10,102,330)
- Points leader: (Spain) Carlos Alcaraz (6,820)

Awards
- Player of the year: (Spain) Carlos Alcaraz
- Doubles team of the year: (Netherlands) Wesley Koolhof; (United Kingdom) Neal Skupski
- Most improved player of the year: (Spain) Carlos Alcaraz
- Newcomer of the year: (Denmark) Holger Rune
- Comeback player of the year: (Croatia) Borna Ćorić

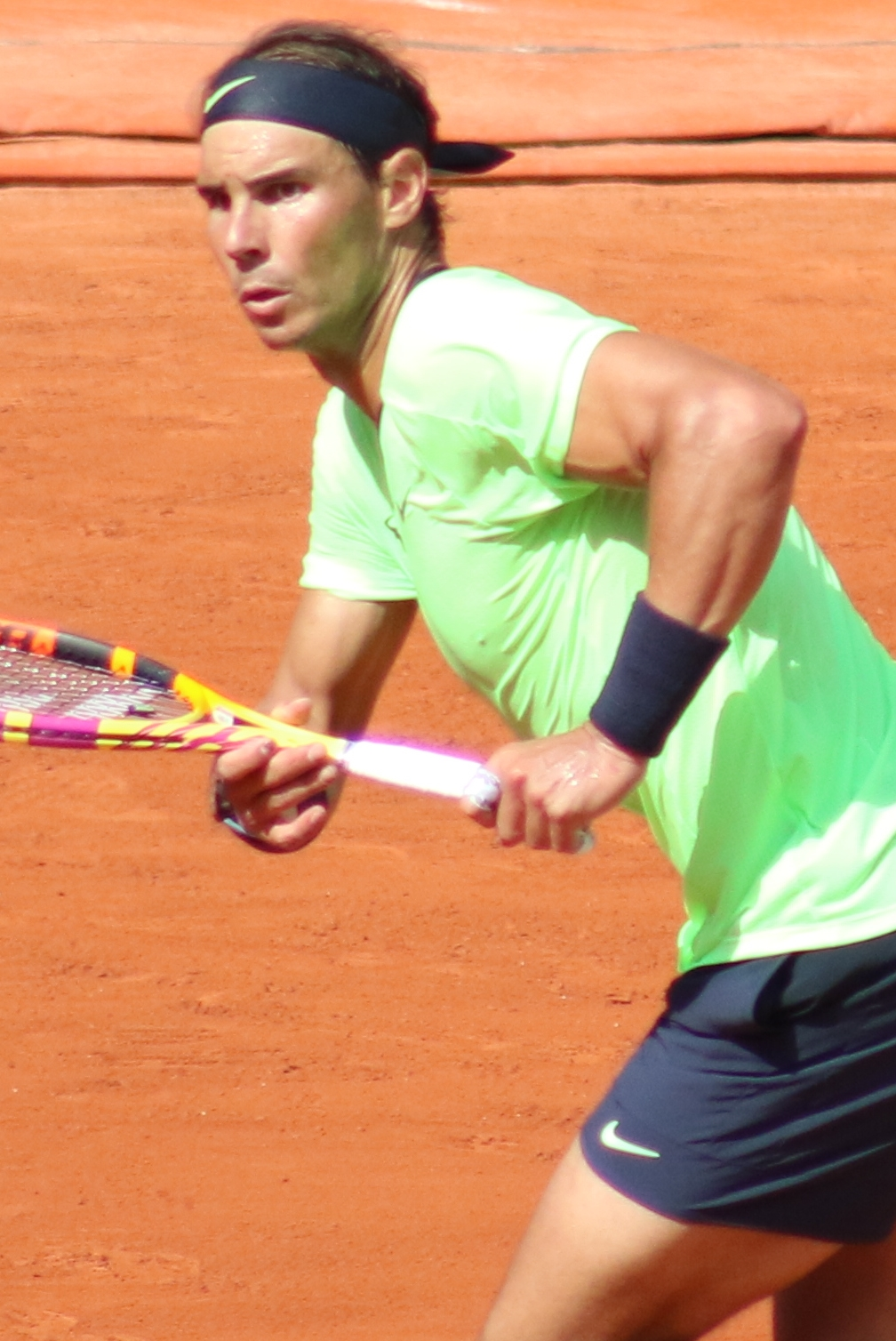
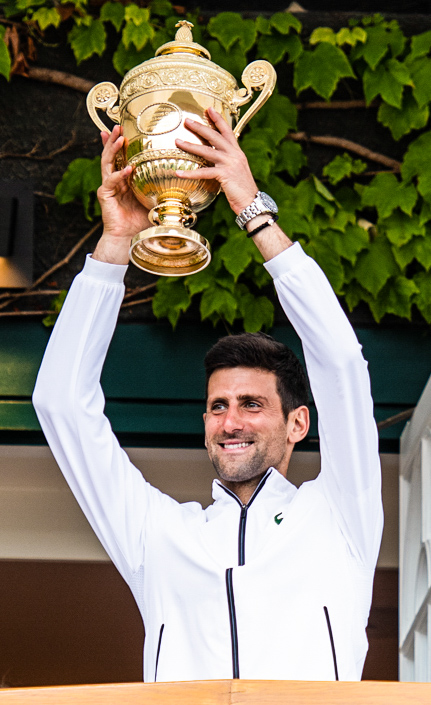
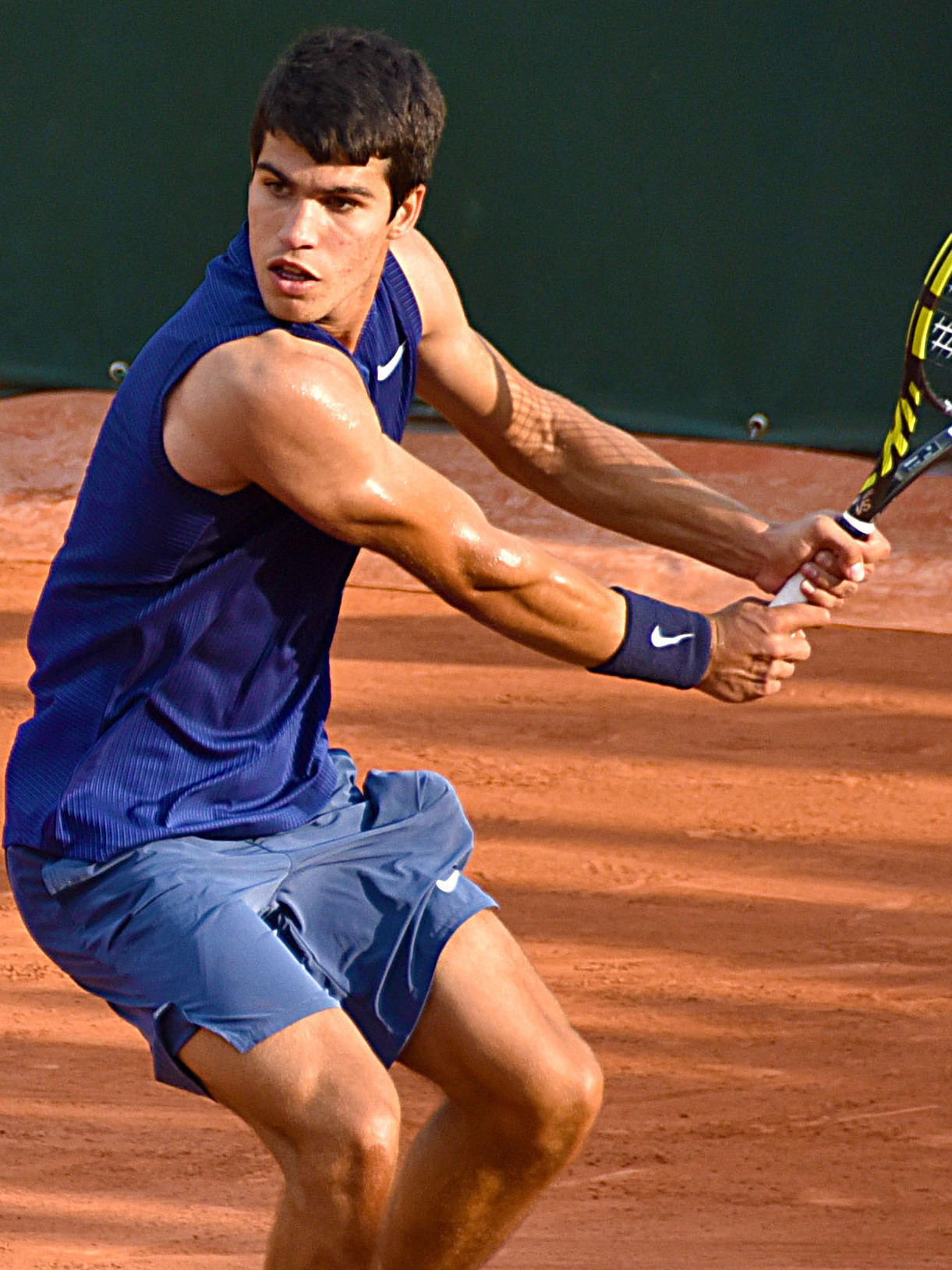
Rafael Nadal defeated Daniil Medvedev in the final to win the Australian Open, his second title there and record-breaking 21st men's singles major title overall, also completing the double career Grand Slam. He then defeated Casper Ruud to win a record-extending 14th French Open title and record-extending 22nd major. Novak Djokovic defeated Nick Kyrgios to win a seventh Wimbledon title and 21st major overall. Carlos Alcaraz defeated Ruud to win his first major title at the US Open, becoming the first male player born in the 21st century, 2000s, and the first Generation Z to win a major. He became the youngest-ever world No. 1.

The 2022 ATP Tour was the global elite men's professional tennis circuit organised by the Association of Tennis Professionals (ATP) for the 2022 tennis season. The 2022 ATP Tour calendar comprised the Grand Slam tournaments (supervised by the International Tennis Federation (ITF)), the ATP Finals, the ATP Tour Masters 1000, the ATP Cup, the ATP 500 series and the ATP 250 series. Also included in the 2022 calendar were the Davis Cup (organised by the ITF), Wimbledon, the Next Gen ATP Finals, and Laver Cup, none of which distributed ranking points. As part of international sports' reaction to the Russian invasion of Ukraine, the ATP, the WTA (Women's Tennis Association), the ITF, and the four Grand Slam tournaments jointly announced on 1 March that players from Belarus and Russia would not be allowed to play in tournaments under the names or flags of their countries, but would remain eligible to play events until further notice. On 20 May 2022, the ATP, ITF, and WTA announced that ranking points would not be awarded for Wimbledon, due to the All England Club's decision to prohibit players from Belarus or Russia from participating in the tournament.

== Schedule ==
This was the schedule of events on the 2022 calendar.

Key
Grand Slam tournaments
ATP Finals
ATP Masters 1000
ATP 500
ATP 250
Team events

=== January ===
Week	Tournament	Champions	Runners-up	Semifinalists	Quarterfinalists
3 Jan	ATP Cup; Sydney, Australia; ATP Cup; Hard – $10,000,000 – 16 teams	Canada; 2–0	Spain	Poland; Russia	
3 Jan	Adelaide International 1 Adelaide, Australia; ATP 250; Hard – $416,800 – 28S/16Q/24D; Singles – Doubles	(France) Gaël Monfils; 6–4, 6–4	(Russia) Karen Khachanov	(Australia) Thanasi Kokkinakis (Croatia) Marin Čilić	(United States) Tommy Paul (Sweden) Mikael Ymer (Serbia) Laslo Đere (Belarus) Egor Gerasimov
3 Jan	Adelaide International 1 Adelaide, Australia; ATP 250; Hard – $416,800 – 28S/16Q/24D; Singles – Doubles	(India) Rohan Bopanna (India) Ramkumar Ramanathan; 7–6^{(8–6)}, 6–1	(Croatia) Ivan Dodig (Brazil) Marcelo Melo	(Australia) Thanasi Kokkinakis (Croatia) Marin Čilić	(United States) Tommy Paul (Sweden) Mikael Ymer (Serbia) Laslo Đere (Belarus) Egor Gerasimov
3 Jan	Melbourne Summer Set; Melbourne, Australia; ATP 250; Hard – $521,000 – 28S/16Q/24D; Singles – Doubles	(Spain) Rafael Nadal; 7–6^{(8–6)}, 6–3	(United States) Maxime Cressy	(Finland) Emil Ruusuvuori (Bulgaria) Grigor Dimitrov	(Netherlands) Tallon Griekspoor (Slovakia) Alex Molčan (Netherlands) Botic van de Zandschulp (Spain) Jaume Munar
3 Jan	Melbourne Summer Set; Melbourne, Australia; ATP 250; Hard – $521,000 – 28S/16Q/24D; Singles – Doubles	(Netherlands) Wesley Koolhof (United Kingdom) Neal Skupski; 6–4, 6–4	(Kazakhstan) Aleksandr Nedovyesov (Pakistan) Aisam-ul-Haq Qureshi	(Finland) Emil Ruusuvuori (Bulgaria) Grigor Dimitrov	(Netherlands) Tallon Griekspoor (Slovakia) Alex Molčan (Netherlands) Botic van de Zandschulp (Spain) Jaume Munar
10 Jan	Sydney Tennis Classic; Sydney, Australia; ATP 250; Hard – $521,000 – 28S/16Q/24D; Singles – Doubles	(Russia) Aslan Karatsev; 6–3, 6–3	(United Kingdom) Andy Murray	(United Kingdom) Daniel Evans (United States) Reilly Opelka	(Italy) Lorenzo Sonego (United States) Maxime Cressy (United States) Brandon Nakashima (Belgium) David Goffin
10 Jan	Sydney Tennis Classic; Sydney, Australia; ATP 250; Hard – $521,000 – 28S/16Q/24D; Singles – Doubles	(Australia) John Peers (Slovakia) Filip Polášek; 7–5, 7–5	(Italy) Simone Bolelli (Italy) Fabio Fognini	(United Kingdom) Daniel Evans (United States) Reilly Opelka	(Italy) Lorenzo Sonego (United States) Maxime Cressy (United States) Brandon Nakashima (Belgium) David Goffin
10 Jan	Adelaide International 2 Adelaide, Australia; ATP 250; Hard – $493,875 – 28S/16Q/24D; Singles – Doubles	(Australia) Thanasi Kokkinakis; 6–7^{(6–8)}, 7–6^{(7–5)}, 6–3	(France) Arthur Rinderknech	(France) Corentin Moutet (Croatia) Marin Čilić	(Brazil) Thiago Monteiro (Russia) Karen Khachanov (United States) Tommy Paul (Australia) Aleksandar Vukic
10 Jan	Adelaide International 2 Adelaide, Australia; ATP 250; Hard – $493,875 – 28S/16Q/24D; Singles – Doubles	(Netherlands) Wesley Koolhof (United Kingdom) Neal Skupski; 7–6^{(7–5)}, 6–4	(Uruguay) Ariel Behar (Ecuador) Gonzalo Escobar	(France) Corentin Moutet (Croatia) Marin Čilić	(Brazil) Thiago Monteiro (Russia) Karen Khachanov (United States) Tommy Paul (Australia) Aleksandar Vukic
17 Jan; 24 Jan	Australian Open; Melbourne, Australia; Grand Slam; Hard – A$33,784,200; 128S/128Q/64D/32X; Singles – Doubles – Mixed	(Spain) Rafael Nadal; 2–6, 6–7^{(5–7)}, 6–4, 6–4, 7–5	(Russia) Daniil Medvedev	(Italy) Matteo Berrettini (Greece) Stefanos Tsitsipas	(France) Gaël Monfils (Canada) Denis Shapovalov (Italy) Jannik Sinner (Canada) Félix Auger-Aliassime
17 Jan; 24 Jan	Australian Open; Melbourne, Australia; Grand Slam; Hard – A$33,784,200; 128S/128Q/64D/32X; Singles – Doubles – Mixed	(Australia) Thanasi Kokkinakis (Australia) Nick Kyrgios; 7–5, 6–4	(Australia) Matthew Ebden (Australia) Max Purcell	(Italy) Matteo Berrettini (Greece) Stefanos Tsitsipas	(France) Gaël Monfils (Canada) Denis Shapovalov (Italy) Jannik Sinner (Canada) Félix Auger-Aliassime
17 Jan; 24 Jan	Australian Open; Melbourne, Australia; Grand Slam; Hard – A$33,784,200; 128S/128Q/64D/32X; Singles – Doubles – Mixed	(France) Kristina Mladenovic (Croatia) Ivan Dodig; 6–3, 6–4	(Australia) Jaimee Fourlis (Australia) Jason Kubler	(Italy) Matteo Berrettini (Greece) Stefanos Tsitsipas	(France) Gaël Monfils (Canada) Denis Shapovalov (Italy) Jannik Sinner (Canada) Félix Auger-Aliassime
31 Jan	Open Sud de France; Montpellier, France; ATP 250; Hard (i) – €490,990 – 28S/16Q/16D; Singles – Doubles	(Kazakhstan) Alexander Bublik; 6–4, 6–3	(Germany) Alexander Zverev	(Sweden) Mikael Ymer (Serbia) Filip Krajinović	(France) Adrian Mannarino (France) Richard Gasquet (Bosnia and Herzegovina) Damir Džumhur (Spain) Roberto Bautista Agut
31 Jan	Open Sud de France; Montpellier, France; ATP 250; Hard (i) – €490,990 – 28S/16Q/16D; Singles – Doubles	(France) Pierre-Hugues Herbert (France) Nicolas Mahut; 4–6, 7–6^{(7–3)}, [12–10]	(United Kingdom) Lloyd Glasspool (Finland) Harri Heliövaara	(Sweden) Mikael Ymer (Serbia) Filip Krajinović	(France) Adrian Mannarino (France) Richard Gasquet (Bosnia and Herzegovina) Damir Džumhur (Spain) Roberto Bautista Agut
31 Jan	Maharashtra Open; Pune, India; ATP 250; Hard – $493,875 – 28S/16Q/16D; Singles – Doubles	(Portugal) João Sousa; 7–6^{(11–9)}, 4–6, 6–1	(Finland) Emil Ruusuvuori	(Sweden) Elias Ymer (Poland) Kamil Majchrzak	(Italy) Stefano Travaglia (Germany) Daniel Altmaier (Czech Republic) Jiří Veselý (Italy) Lorenzo Musetti
31 Jan	Maharashtra Open; Pune, India; ATP 250; Hard – $493,875 – 28S/16Q/16D; Singles – Doubles	(India) Rohan Bopanna (India) Ramkumar Ramanathan; 6–7^{(10–12)}, 6–3, [10–6]	(Australia) Luke Saville (Australia) John-Patrick Smith	(Sweden) Elias Ymer (Poland) Kamil Majchrzak	(Italy) Stefano Travaglia (Germany) Daniel Altmaier (Czech Republic) Jiří Veselý (Italy) Lorenzo Musetti
31 Jan	Córdoba Open; Córdoba, Argentina; ATP 250; Clay (red) – $493,875 – 28S/16Q/16D; Singles – Doubles	(Spain) Albert Ramos Viñolas; 4–6, 6–3, 6–4	(Chile) Alejandro Tabilo	(Argentina) Diego Schwartzman (Argentina) Juan Ignacio Londero	(Colombia) Daniel Elahi Galán (Argentina) Sebastián Báez (Italy) Lorenzo Sonego (Serbia) Nikola Milojević
31 Jan	Córdoba Open; Córdoba, Argentina; ATP 250; Clay (red) – $493,875 – 28S/16Q/16D; Singles – Doubles	(Mexico) Santiago González (Argentina) Andrés Molteni; 7–5, 6–3	(Slovakia) Andrej Martin (Austria) Tristan-Samuel Weissborn	(Argentina) Diego Schwartzman (Argentina) Juan Ignacio Londero	(Colombia) Daniel Elahi Galán (Argentina) Sebastián Báez (Italy) Lorenzo Sonego (Serbia) Nikola Milojević

=== February ===
Week	Tournament	Champions	Runners-up	Semifinalists	Quarterfinalists
7 Feb	Rotterdam Open; Rotterdam, Netherlands; ATP 500; Hard (i) – €1,349,070 – 32S/16Q/16D; Singles – Doubles	(Canada) Félix Auger-Aliassime; 6–4, 6–2	(Greece) Stefanos Tsitsipas	(Czech Republic) Jiří Lehečka (Russia) Andrey Rublev	(Australia) Alex de Minaur (Italy) Lorenzo Musetti (United Kingdom) Cameron Norrie (Hungary) Márton Fucsovics
7 Feb	Rotterdam Open; Rotterdam, Netherlands; ATP 500; Hard (i) – €1,349,070 – 32S/16Q/16D; Singles – Doubles	(Netherlands) Robin Haase (Netherlands) Matwé Middelkoop; 4–6, 7–6^{(7–5)}, [10–5]	(South Africa) Lloyd Harris (Germany) Tim Pütz	(Czech Republic) Jiří Lehečka (Russia) Andrey Rublev	(Australia) Alex de Minaur (Italy) Lorenzo Musetti (United Kingdom) Cameron Norrie (Hungary) Márton Fucsovics
7 Feb	Argentina Open; Buenos Aires, Argentina; ATP 250; Clay (red) – $686,700 – 28S/16Q/16D; Singles – Doubles	(Norway) Casper Ruud; 5–7, 6–2, 6–3	(Argentina) Diego Schwartzman	(Argentina) Federico Delbonis (Italy) Lorenzo Sonego	(Argentina) Federico Coria (Italy) Fabio Fognini (Spain) Fernando Verdasco (Argentina) Francisco Cerúndolo
7 Feb	Argentina Open; Buenos Aires, Argentina; ATP 250; Clay (red) – $686,700 – 28S/16Q/16D; Singles – Doubles	(Mexico) Santiago González (Argentina) Andrés Molteni; 6–1, 6–1	(Italy) Fabio Fognini (Argentina) Horacio Zeballos	(Argentina) Federico Delbonis (Italy) Lorenzo Sonego	(Argentina) Federico Coria (Italy) Fabio Fognini (Spain) Fernando Verdasco (Argentina) Francisco Cerúndolo
7 Feb	Dallas Open; Dallas, United States; ATP 250; Hard (i) – $792,980 – 28S/16Q/16D; Singles – Doubles	(United States) Reilly Opelka; 7–6^{(7–5)}, 7–6^{(7–3)}	(United States) Jenson Brooksby	(United States) Marcos Giron (United States) John Isner	(United States) Taylor Fritz (Australia) Jordan Thompson (Canada) Vasek Pospisil (France) Adrian Mannarino
7 Feb	Dallas Open; Dallas, United States; ATP 250; Hard (i) – $792,980 – 28S/16Q/16D; Singles – Doubles	(El Salvador) Marcelo Arévalo (Netherlands) Jean-Julien Rojer; 7–6^{(7–4)}, 6–4	(Finland) Harri Heliövaara (United Kingdom) Lloyd Glasspool	(United States) Marcos Giron (United States) John Isner	(United States) Taylor Fritz (Australia) Jordan Thompson (Canada) Vasek Pospisil (France) Adrian Mannarino
14 Feb	Rio Open; Rio de Janeiro, Brazil; ATP 500; Clay (red) – $1,815,115 – 28S/16Q/16D; Singles – Doubles	(Spain) Carlos Alcaraz; 6–4, 6–2	(Argentina) Diego Schwartzman	(Italy) Fabio Fognini (Argentina) Francisco Cerúndolo	(Italy) Matteo Berrettini (Argentina) Federico Coria (Spain) Pablo Andújar (Serbia) Miomir Kecmanović
14 Feb	Rio Open; Rio de Janeiro, Brazil; ATP 500; Clay (red) – $1,815,115 – 28S/16Q/16D; Singles – Doubles	(Italy) Simone Bolelli (Italy) Fabio Fognini; 7–5, 6–7^{(2–7)}, [10–6]	(United Kingdom) Jamie Murray (Brazil) Bruno Soares	(Italy) Fabio Fognini (Argentina) Francisco Cerúndolo	(Italy) Matteo Berrettini (Argentina) Federico Coria (Spain) Pablo Andújar (Serbia) Miomir Kecmanović
14 Feb	Open 13; Marseille, France; ATP 250; Hard (i) – €622,610 – 28S/16Q/16D; Singles – Doubles	(Russia) Andrey Rublev; 7–5, 7–6^{(7–4)}	(Canada) Félix Auger-Aliassime	(Russia) Roman Safiullin (France) Benjamin Bonzi	(Greece) Stefanos Tsitsipas (Belarus) Ilya Ivashka (Russia) Aslan Karatsev (France) Lucas Pouille
14 Feb	Open 13; Marseille, France; ATP 250; Hard (i) – €622,610 – 28S/16Q/16D; Singles – Doubles	(Ukraine) Denys Molchanov (Russia) Andrey Rublev; 4–6, 7–5, [10–7]	(South Africa) Raven Klaasen (Japan) Ben McLachlan	(Russia) Roman Safiullin (France) Benjamin Bonzi	(Greece) Stefanos Tsitsipas (Belarus) Ilya Ivashka (Russia) Aslan Karatsev (France) Lucas Pouille
14 Feb	Delray Beach Open; Delray Beach, United States; ATP 250; Hard – $664,275 – 28S/16Q/16D; Singles – Doubles	(United Kingdom) Cameron Norrie; 7–6^{(7–1)}, 7–6^{(7–4)}	(United States) Reilly Opelka	(United States) Tommy Paul (Australia) John Millman	(United States) Sebastian Korda (United States) Stefan Kozlov (Bulgaria) Grigor Dimitrov (France) Adrian Mannarino
14 Feb	Delray Beach Open; Delray Beach, United States; ATP 250; Hard – $664,275 – 28S/16Q/16D; Singles – Doubles	(El Salvador) Marcelo Arévalo (Netherlands) Jean-Julien Rojer; 6–2, 6–7^{(5–7)}, [10–4]	(Kazakhstan) Aleksandr Nedovyesov (Pakistan) Aisam-ul-Haq Qureshi	(United States) Tommy Paul (Australia) John Millman	(United States) Sebastian Korda (United States) Stefan Kozlov (Bulgaria) Grigor Dimitrov (France) Adrian Mannarino
14 Feb	Qatar Open; Doha, Qatar; ATP 250; Hard – $1,176,595 – 28S/16Q/16D; Singles – Doubles	(Spain) Roberto Bautista Agut; 6–3, 6–4	(Georgia (country)) Nikoloz Basilashvili	(France) Arthur Rinderknech (Russia) Karen Khachanov	(Canada) Denis Shapovalov (Hungary) Márton Fucsovics (Croatia) Marin Čilić (Spain) Alejandro Davidovich; Fokina
14 Feb	Qatar Open; Doha, Qatar; ATP 250; Hard – $1,176,595 – 28S/16Q/16D; Singles – Doubles	(Netherlands) Wesley Koolhof (United Kingdom) Neal Skupski; 7–6^{(7–4)}, 6–1	(India) Rohan Bopanna (Canada) Denis Shapovalov	(France) Arthur Rinderknech (Russia) Karen Khachanov	(Canada) Denis Shapovalov (Hungary) Márton Fucsovics (Croatia) Marin Čilić (Spain) Alejandro Davidovich; Fokina
21 Feb	Dubai Tennis Championships; Dubai, United Arab Emirates; ATP 500; Hard – $2,949,665 – 32S/16Q/16D; Singles – Doubles	(Russia) Andrey Rublev; 6–3, 6–4	(Czech Republic) Jiří Veselý	(Canada) Denis Shapovalov (Poland) Hubert Hurkacz	(Serbia) Novak Djokovic (Lithuania) Ričardas Berankis (Italy) Jannik Sinner (United States) Mackenzie McDonald
21 Feb	Dubai Tennis Championships; Dubai, United Arab Emirates; ATP 500; Hard – $2,949,665 – 32S/16Q/16D; Singles – Doubles	(Germany) Tim Pütz (New Zealand) Michael Venus; 6–3, 6–7^{(5–7)}, [16–14]	(Croatia) Nikola Mektić (Croatia) Mate Pavić	(Canada) Denis Shapovalov (Poland) Hubert Hurkacz	(Serbia) Novak Djokovic (Lithuania) Ričardas Berankis (Italy) Jannik Sinner (United States) Mackenzie McDonald
21 Feb	Mexican Open; Acapulco, Mexico; ATP 500; Hard – $1,832,890 – 32S/16Q/16D; Singles – Doubles	(Spain) Rafael Nadal; 6–4, 6–4	(United Kingdom) Cameron Norrie	(Russia) Daniil Medvedev (Greece) Stefanos Tsitsipas	(Japan) Yoshihito Nishioka (United States) Tommy Paul (United States) Marcos Giron (Germany) Peter Gojowczyk
21 Feb	Mexican Open; Acapulco, Mexico; ATP 500; Hard – $1,832,890 – 32S/16Q/16D; Singles – Doubles	(Spain) Feliciano López (Greece) Stefanos Tsitsipas; 7–5, 6–4	(El Salvador) Marcelo Arévalo (Netherlands) Jean-Julien Rojer	(Russia) Daniil Medvedev (Greece) Stefanos Tsitsipas	(Japan) Yoshihito Nishioka (United States) Tommy Paul (United States) Marcos Giron (Germany) Peter Gojowczyk
21 Feb	Chile Open; Santiago, Chile; ATP 250; Clay (red) – $546,340 – 28S/16Q/16D; Singles – Doubles	(Spain) Pedro Martínez; 4–6, 6–4, 6–4	(Argentina) Sebastián Báez	(Chile) Alejandro Tabilo (Spain) Albert Ramos Viñolas	(Serbia) Miomir Kecmanović (Germany) Yannick Hanfmann (Brazil) Thiago Monteiro (Argentina) Facundo Bagnis
21 Feb	Chile Open; Santiago, Chile; ATP 250; Clay (red) – $546,340 – 28S/16Q/16D; Singles – Doubles	(Brazil) Rafael Matos (Brazil) Felipe Meligeni Alves; 7–6^{(10–8)}, 7–6^{(7–3)}	(Sweden) André Göransson (United States) Nathaniel Lammons	(Chile) Alejandro Tabilo (Spain) Albert Ramos Viñolas	(Serbia) Miomir Kecmanović (Germany) Yannick Hanfmann (Brazil) Thiago Monteiro (Argentina) Facundo Bagnis
28 Feb	Davis Cup qualifying round Buenos Aires, Argentina – clay Bratislava, Slovakia – hard (i); Espoo, Finland – hard (i); Helsingborg, Sweden – hard (i); Pau, France – hard (i); Marbella, Spain – clay Oslo, Norway – hard (i); Reno, Nevada, United States – hard (i); The Hague, Netherlands – clay (i); Sydney, Australia – hard Seoul, South Korea – hard (i); Rio de Janeiro, Brazil – clay	Qualifying round winners Argentina 3–0; Italy 3–2; Belgium 3–2; Sweden 3–2; France 3–0; Spain 3–1; Kazakhstan 3–1; United States 3–0; Netherlands 3–0; Australia 3–2; South Korea 3–1; Germany 3–1	Qualifying round losers Czech Republic; Slovakia; Finland; Japan; Ecuador; Romania; Norway; Colombia; Canada; Hungary; Austria; Brazil		

=== March ===
Week	Tournament	Champions	Runners-up	Semifinalists	Quarterfinalists
7 Mar; 14 Mar	Indian Wells Open; Indian Wells, United States; ATP Masters 1000; Hard – $8,584,055 – 96S/48Q/32D; Singles – Doubles	(United States) Taylor Fritz; 6–3, 7–6^{(7–5)}	(Spain) Rafael Nadal	(Spain) Carlos Alcaraz; Andrey Rublev	(United Kingdom) Cameron Norrie (Australia) Nick Kyrgios (Serbia) Miomir Kecmanović (Bulgaria) Grigor Dimitrov
7 Mar; 14 Mar	Indian Wells Open; Indian Wells, United States; ATP Masters 1000; Hard – $8,584,055 – 96S/48Q/32D; Singles – Doubles	(United States) John Isner (United States) Jack Sock; 7–6^{(7–4)}, 6–3	(Mexico) Santiago González (France) Édouard Roger-Vasselin	(Spain) Carlos Alcaraz; Andrey Rublev	(United Kingdom) Cameron Norrie (Australia) Nick Kyrgios (Serbia) Miomir Kecmanović (Bulgaria) Grigor Dimitrov
21 Mar; 28 Mar	Miami Open; Miami Gardens, United States; ATP Masters 1000; Hard – $8,584,055 – 96S/48Q/32D; Singles – Doubles	(Spain) Carlos Alcaraz; 7–5, 6–4	(Norway) Casper Ruud	(Poland) Hubert Hurkacz (Argentina) Francisco Cerúndolo	Daniil Medvedev (Serbia) Miomir Kecmanović (Italy) Jannik Sinner (Germany) Alexander Zverev
21 Mar; 28 Mar	Miami Open; Miami Gardens, United States; ATP Masters 1000; Hard – $8,584,055 – 96S/48Q/32D; Singles – Doubles	(Poland) Hubert Hurkacz (United States) John Isner; 7–6^{(7–5)}, 6–4	(Netherlands) Wesley Koolhof (United Kingdom) Neal Skupski	(Poland) Hubert Hurkacz (Argentina) Francisco Cerúndolo	Daniil Medvedev (Serbia) Miomir Kecmanović (Italy) Jannik Sinner (Germany) Alexander Zverev

=== April ===
Week	Tournament	Champions	Runners-up	Semifinalists	Quarterfinalists
4 Apr	U.S. Men's Clay Court Championships; Houston, United States; ATP 250; Clay (maroon) – $665,330 – 28S/16Q/16D; Singles – Doubles	(United States) Reilly Opelka; 6–3, 7–6^{(9–7)}	(United States) John Isner	(Australia) Nick Kyrgios (Chile) Cristian Garín	(United States) Michael Mmoh (Netherlands) Gijs Brouwer (United States) Frances Tiafoe (United States) Taylor Fritz
4 Apr	U.S. Men's Clay Court Championships; Houston, United States; ATP 250; Clay (maroon) – $665,330 – 28S/16Q/16D; Singles – Doubles	(Australia) Matthew Ebden (Australia) Max Purcell; 6–3, 6–3	(Serbia) Ivan Sabanov (Serbia) Matej Sabanov	(Australia) Nick Kyrgios (Chile) Cristian Garín	(United States) Michael Mmoh (Netherlands) Gijs Brouwer (United States) Frances Tiafoe (United States) Taylor Fritz
4 Apr	Grand Prix Hassan II; Marrakesh, Morocco; ATP 250; Clay (red) – €597,900 – 32S/16Q/16D; Singles – Doubles	(Belgium) David Goffin; 3–6, 6–3, 6–3	(Slovakia) Alex Molčan	(Serbia) Laslo Đere (Argentina) Federico Coria	(Netherlands) Botic van de Zandschulp (Italy) Lorenzo Musetti (France) Richard Gasquet (Spain) Roberto Carballés Baena
4 Apr	Grand Prix Hassan II; Marrakesh, Morocco; ATP 250; Clay (red) – €597,900 – 32S/16Q/16D; Singles – Doubles	(Brazil) Rafael Matos (Spain) David Vega Hernández; 6–1, 7–5	(Italy) Andrea Vavassori (Poland) Jan Zieliński	(Serbia) Laslo Đere (Argentina) Federico Coria	(Netherlands) Botic van de Zandschulp (Italy) Lorenzo Musetti (France) Richard Gasquet (Spain) Roberto Carballés Baena
11 Apr	Monte-Carlo Masters; Roquebrune-Cap-Martin, France; ATP Masters 1000; Clay (red) – €5,415,410 – 56S/28Q/28D; Singles – Doubles	(Greece) Stefanos Tsitsipas; 6–3, 7–6^{(7–3)}	(Spain) Alejandro Davidovich Fokina	(Bulgaria) Grigor Dimitrov (Germany) Alexander Zverev	(United States) Taylor Fritz (Poland) Hubert Hurkacz (Argentina) Diego Schwartzman (Italy) Jannik Sinner
11 Apr	Monte-Carlo Masters; Roquebrune-Cap-Martin, France; ATP Masters 1000; Clay (red) – €5,415,410 – 56S/28Q/28D; Singles – Doubles	(United States) Rajeev Ram (United Kingdom) Joe Salisbury; 6–4, 3–6, [10–7]	(Colombia) Juan Sebastián Cabal (Colombia) Robert Farah	(Bulgaria) Grigor Dimitrov (Germany) Alexander Zverev	(United States) Taylor Fritz (Poland) Hubert Hurkacz (Argentina) Diego Schwartzman (Italy) Jannik Sinner
18 Apr	Barcelona Open; Barcelona, Spain; ATP 500; Clay (red) – €2,802,580 – 48S/24Q/16D; Singles – Doubles	(Spain) Carlos Alcaraz; 6–3, 6–2	(Spain) Pablo Carreño Busta	(Australia) Alex de Minaur (Argentina) Diego Schwartzman	(Greece) Stefanos Tsitsipas (United Kingdom) Cameron Norrie (Canada) Félix Auger-Aliassime (Norway) Casper Ruud
18 Apr	Barcelona Open; Barcelona, Spain; ATP 500; Clay (red) – €2,802,580 – 48S/24Q/16D; Singles – Doubles	(Germany) Kevin Krawietz (Germany) Andreas Mies; 6–7^{(3–7)}, 7–6^{(7–5)}, [10–6]	(Netherlands) Wesley Koolhof (United Kingdom) Neal Skupski	(Australia) Alex de Minaur (Argentina) Diego Schwartzman	(Greece) Stefanos Tsitsipas (United Kingdom) Cameron Norrie (Canada) Félix Auger-Aliassime (Norway) Casper Ruud
18 Apr	Serbia Open; Belgrade, Serbia; ATP 250; Clay (red) – €597,900 – 28S/16Q/16D; Singles – Doubles	Andrey Rublev; 6–2, 6–7^{(4–7)}, 6–0	(Serbia) Novak Djokovic	Karen Khachanov (Italy) Fabio Fognini	(Serbia) Miomir Kecmanović (Brazil) Thiago Monteiro (Germany) Oscar Otte (Japan) Taro Daniel
18 Apr	Serbia Open; Belgrade, Serbia; ATP 250; Clay (red) – €597,900 – 28S/16Q/16D; Singles – Doubles	(Uruguay) Ariel Behar (Ecuador) Gonzalo Escobar; 6–2, 3–6, [10–7]	(Croatia) Nikola Mektić (Croatia) Mate Pavić	Karen Khachanov (Italy) Fabio Fognini	(Serbia) Miomir Kecmanović (Brazil) Thiago Monteiro (Germany) Oscar Otte (Japan) Taro Daniel
25 Apr	Estoril Open; Cascais, Portugal; ATP 250; Clay (red) – €597,900 – 28S/16Q/16D; Singles – Doubles	(Argentina) Sebastián Báez; 6–3, 6–2	(United States) Frances Tiafoe	(United States) Sebastian Korda (Spain) Albert Ramos Viñolas	(Canada) Félix Auger-Aliassime (Spain) Alejandro Davidovich; Fokina (France) Richard Gasquet (Spain) Fernando Verdasco
25 Apr	Estoril Open; Cascais, Portugal; ATP 250; Clay (red) – €597,900 – 28S/16Q/16D; Singles – Doubles	(Portugal) Nuno Borges (Portugal) Francisco Cabral; 6–2, 6–3	(Argentina) Máximo González (Sweden) André Göransson	(United States) Sebastian Korda (Spain) Albert Ramos Viñolas	(Canada) Félix Auger-Aliassime (Spain) Alejandro Davidovich; Fokina (France) Richard Gasquet (Spain) Fernando Verdasco
25 Apr	Bavarian International Tennis; Championships; Munich, Germany; ATP 250; Clay (red) – €597,900 – 28S/16Q/16D; Singles – Doubles	(Denmark) Holger Rune; 3–4 Ret.	(Netherlands) Botic van de Zandschulp	(Germany) Oscar Otte (Serbia) Miomir Kecmanović	(Finland) Emil Ruusuvuori (Chile) Alejandro Tabilo (Georgia (country)) Nikoloz Basilashvili (Norway) Casper Ruud
25 Apr	Bavarian International Tennis; Championships; Munich, Germany; ATP 250; Clay (red) – €597,900 – 28S/16Q/16D; Singles – Doubles	(Germany) Kevin Krawietz (Germany) Andreas Mies; 4–6, 6–4, [10–7]	(Brazil) Rafael Matos (Spain) David Vega Hernández	(Germany) Oscar Otte (Serbia) Miomir Kecmanović	(Finland) Emil Ruusuvuori (Chile) Alejandro Tabilo (Georgia (country)) Nikoloz Basilashvili (Norway) Casper Ruud

=== May ===
Week	Tournament	Champions	Runners-up	Semifinalists	Quarterfinalists
2 May	Madrid Open; Madrid, Spain; ATP Masters 1000; Clay (red) – €6,744,165 – 56S/28Q/28D; Singles – Doubles	(Spain) Carlos Alcaraz; 6–3, 6–1	(Germany) Alexander Zverev	(Serbia) Novak Djokovic (Greece) Stefanos Tsitsipas	(Poland) Hubert Hurkacz (Spain) Rafael Nadal; Andrey Rublev (Canada) Félix Auger-Aliassime
2 May	Madrid Open; Madrid, Spain; ATP Masters 1000; Clay (red) – €6,744,165 – 56S/28Q/28D; Singles – Doubles	(Netherlands) Wesley Koolhof (United Kingdom) Neal Skupski; 6–7^{(4–7)}, 6–4, [10–5]	(Colombia) Juan Sebastián Cabal (Colombia) Robert Farah	(Serbia) Novak Djokovic (Greece) Stefanos Tsitsipas	(Poland) Hubert Hurkacz (Spain) Rafael Nadal; Andrey Rublev (Canada) Félix Auger-Aliassime
9 May	Italian Open; Rome, Italy; ATP Masters 1000; Clay (red) – €5,415,410 – 56S/28Q/32D; Singles – Doubles	(Serbia) Novak Djokovic; 6–0, 7–6^{(7–5)}	(Greece) Stefanos Tsitsipas	(Norway) Casper Ruud (Germany) Alexander Zverev	(Canada) Félix Auger-Aliassime (Canada) Denis Shapovalov (Italy) Jannik Sinner (Chile) Cristian Garín
9 May	Italian Open; Rome, Italy; ATP Masters 1000; Clay (red) – €5,415,410 – 56S/28Q/32D; Singles – Doubles	(Croatia) Nikola Mektić (Croatia) Mate Pavić; 6–2, 6–7^{(6–8)}, [12–10]	(United States) John Isner (Argentina) Diego Schwartzman	(Norway) Casper Ruud (Germany) Alexander Zverev	(Canada) Félix Auger-Aliassime (Canada) Denis Shapovalov (Italy) Jannik Sinner (Chile) Cristian Garín
16 May	Geneva Open; Geneva, Switzerland; ATP 250; Clay (red) – €597,900 – 28S/16Q/16D; Singles – Doubles	(Norway) Casper Ruud; 7–6^{(7–3)}, 4–6, 7–6^{(7–1)}	(Portugal) João Sousa	(France) Richard Gasquet (United States) Reilly Opelka	(Poland) Kamil Majchrzak; Ilya Ivashka (Netherlands) Tallon Griekspoor (Australia) Thanasi Kokkinakis
16 May	Geneva Open; Geneva, Switzerland; ATP 250; Clay (red) – €597,900 – 28S/16Q/16D; Singles – Doubles	(Croatia) Nikola Mektić (Croatia) Mate Pavić; 2–6, 6–2, [10–3]	(Spain) Pablo Andújar (Netherlands) Matwé Middelkoop	(France) Richard Gasquet (United States) Reilly Opelka	(Poland) Kamil Majchrzak; Ilya Ivashka (Netherlands) Tallon Griekspoor (Australia) Thanasi Kokkinakis
16 May	Lyon Open; Lyon, France; ATP 250; Clay (red) – €597,900 – 28S/16Q/16D; Singles – Doubles	(United Kingdom) Cameron Norrie; 6–3, 6–7^{(3–7)}, 6–1	(Slovakia) Alex Molčan	(Denmark) Holger Rune (Australia) Alex de Minaur	(Argentina) Sebastián Báez (France) Manuel Guinard (Japan) Yosuke Watanuki (Argentina) Federico Coria
16 May	Lyon Open; Lyon, France; ATP 250; Clay (red) – €597,900 – 28S/16Q/16D; Singles – Doubles	(Croatia) Ivan Dodig (United States) Austin Krajicek; 6–3, 6–4	(Argentina) Máximo González (Brazil) Marcelo Melo	(Denmark) Holger Rune (Australia) Alex de Minaur	(Argentina) Sebastián Báez (France) Manuel Guinard (Japan) Yosuke Watanuki (Argentina) Federico Coria
23 May; 30 May	French Open; Paris, France; Grand Slam; Clay (red) – €20,786,400; 128S/128Q/64D/32X; Singles – Doubles – Mixed	(Spain) Rafael Nadal; 6–3, 6–3, 6–0	(Norway) Casper Ruud	(Germany) Alexander Zverev (Croatia) Marin Čilić	(Serbia) Novak Djokovic (Spain) Carlos Alcaraz (Denmark) Holger Rune; Andrey Rublev
23 May; 30 May	French Open; Paris, France; Grand Slam; Clay (red) – €20,786,400; 128S/128Q/64D/32X; Singles – Doubles – Mixed	(El Salvador) Marcelo Arévalo (Netherlands) Jean-Julien Rojer; 6–7^{(4–7)}, 7–6^{(7–5)}, 6–3	(Croatia) Ivan Dodig (United States) Austin Krajicek	(Germany) Alexander Zverev (Croatia) Marin Čilić	(Serbia) Novak Djokovic (Spain) Carlos Alcaraz (Denmark) Holger Rune; Andrey Rublev
23 May; 30 May	French Open; Paris, France; Grand Slam; Clay (red) – €20,786,400; 128S/128Q/64D/32X; Singles – Doubles – Mixed	(Japan) Ena Shibahara (Netherlands) Wesley Koolhof; 7–6^{(7–5)}, 6–2	(Norway) Ulrikke Eikeri (Belgium) Joran Vliegen	(Germany) Alexander Zverev (Croatia) Marin Čilić	(Serbia) Novak Djokovic (Spain) Carlos Alcaraz (Denmark) Holger Rune; Andrey Rublev

=== June ===
Week	Tournament	Champions	Runners-up	Semifinalists	Quarterfinalists
6 Jun	Stuttgart Open; Stuttgart, Germany; ATP 250; Grass – €769,645 – 28S/16Q/16D; Singles – Doubles	(Italy) Matteo Berrettini; 6–4, 5–7, 6–3	(United Kingdom) Andy Murray	(Australia) Nick Kyrgios (Germany) Oscar Otte	(Greece) Stefanos Tsitsipas (Hungary) Márton Fucsovics (France) Benjamin Bonzi (Italy) Lorenzo Sonego
6 Jun	Stuttgart Open; Stuttgart, Germany; ATP 250; Grass – €769,645 – 28S/16Q/16D; Singles – Doubles	(Poland) Hubert Hurkacz (Croatia) Mate Pavić; 7–6^{(7–3)}, 7–6^{(7–5)}	(Germany) Tim Pütz (New Zealand) Michael Venus	(Australia) Nick Kyrgios (Germany) Oscar Otte	(Greece) Stefanos Tsitsipas (Hungary) Márton Fucsovics (France) Benjamin Bonzi (Italy) Lorenzo Sonego
6 Jun	Rosmalen Grass Court Championships; Rosmalen, Netherlands; ATP 250; Grass – €725,540 – 28S/16Q/16D; Singles – Doubles	(Netherlands) Tim van Rijthoven; 6–4, 6–1	Daniil Medvedev	(France) Adrian Mannarino (Canada) Félix Auger-Aliassime	Ilya Ivashka (United States) Brandon Nakashima (France) Hugo Gaston; Karen Khachanov
6 Jun	Rosmalen Grass Court Championships; Rosmalen, Netherlands; ATP 250; Grass – €725,540 – 28S/16Q/16D; Singles – Doubles	(Netherlands) Wesley Koolhof (United Kingdom) Neal Skupski; 4–6, 7–5, [10–6]	(Australia) Matthew Ebden (Australia) Max Purcell	(France) Adrian Mannarino (Canada) Félix Auger-Aliassime	Ilya Ivashka (United States) Brandon Nakashima (France) Hugo Gaston; Karen Khachanov
13 Jun	Halle Open; Halle, Germany; ATP 500; Grass – €2,275,275 – 32S/24Q/24D; Singles – Doubles	(Poland) Hubert Hurkacz; 6–1, 6–4	Daniil Medvedev	(Germany) Oscar Otte (Australia) Nick Kyrgios	(Spain) Roberto Bautista Agut; Karen Khachanov (Canada) Félix Auger-Aliassime (Spain) Pablo Carreño Busta
13 Jun	Halle Open; Halle, Germany; ATP 500; Grass – €2,275,275 – 32S/24Q/24D; Singles – Doubles	(Spain) Marcel Granollers (Argentina) Horacio Zeballos; 6–4, 6–7^{(5–7)}, [14–12]	(Germany) Tim Pütz (New Zealand) Michael Venus	(Germany) Oscar Otte (Australia) Nick Kyrgios	(Spain) Roberto Bautista Agut; Karen Khachanov (Canada) Félix Auger-Aliassime (Spain) Pablo Carreño Busta
13 Jun	Queen's Club Championships; London, United Kingdom; ATP 500; Grass – €2,275,275 – 32S/16Q/24D; Singles – Doubles	(Italy) Matteo Berrettini; 7–5, 6–4	(Serbia) Filip Krajinović	(Croatia) Marin Čilić (Netherlands) Botic van de Zandschulp	(United Kingdom) Ryan Peniston (Finland) Emil Ruusuvuori (Spain) Alejandro Davidovich; Fokina (United States) Tommy Paul
13 Jun	Queen's Club Championships; London, United Kingdom; ATP 500; Grass – €2,275,275 – 32S/16Q/24D; Singles – Doubles	(Croatia) Nikola Mektić (Croatia) Mate Pavić; 3–6, 7–6^{(7–3)}, [10–6]	(United Kingdom) Lloyd Glasspool (Finland) Harri Heliövaara	(Croatia) Marin Čilić (Netherlands) Botic van de Zandschulp	(United Kingdom) Ryan Peniston (Finland) Emil Ruusuvuori (Spain) Alejandro Davidovich; Fokina (United States) Tommy Paul
20 Jun	Eastbourne International; Eastbourne, United Kingdom; ATP 250; Grass – €760,750 – 28S/16Q/16D; Singles – Doubles	(United States) Taylor Fritz; 6–2, 6–7^{(4–7)}, 7–6^{(7–4)}	(United States) Maxime Cressy	(United Kingdom) Jack Draper (Australia) Alex de Minaur	(United Kingdom) Cameron Norrie (United Kingdom) Ryan Peniston (Kazakhstan) Alexander Bublik (United States) Tommy Paul
20 Jun	Eastbourne International; Eastbourne, United Kingdom; ATP 250; Grass – €760,750 – 28S/16Q/16D; Singles – Doubles	(Croatia) Nikola Mektić (Croatia) Mate Pavić; 6–4, 6–2	(Netherlands) Matwé Middelkoop (Australia) Luke Saville	(United Kingdom) Jack Draper (Australia) Alex de Minaur	(United Kingdom) Cameron Norrie (United Kingdom) Ryan Peniston (Kazakhstan) Alexander Bublik (United States) Tommy Paul
20 Jun	Mallorca Championships; Santa Ponsa, Spain; ATP 250; Grass – €951,745 – 28S/16Q/16D; Singles – Doubles	(Greece) Stefanos Tsitsipas; 6–4, 3–6, 7–6^{(7–2)}	(Spain) Roberto Bautista Agut	(Switzerland) Antoine Bellier (France) Benjamin Bonzi	Daniil Medvedev (Netherlands) Tallon Griekspoor (Germany) Daniel Altmaier (United States) Marcos Giron
20 Jun	Mallorca Championships; Santa Ponsa, Spain; ATP 250; Grass – €951,745 – 28S/16Q/16D; Singles – Doubles	(Brazil) Rafael Matos (Spain) David Vega Hernández; 7–6^{(7–5)}, 6–7^{(6–8)}, [10–1]	(Uruguay) Ariel Behar (Ecuador) Gonzalo Escobar	(Switzerland) Antoine Bellier (France) Benjamin Bonzi	Daniil Medvedev (Netherlands) Tallon Griekspoor (Germany) Daniel Altmaier (United States) Marcos Giron
27 Jun; 4 Jul	Wimbledon; London, United Kingdom; Grand Slam; Grass – £18,652,000; 128S/128Q/64D/32X; Singles – Doubles – Mixed	(Serbia) Novak Djokovic; 4–6, 6–3, 6–4, 7–6^{(7–3)}	(Australia) Nick Kyrgios	(United Kingdom) Cameron Norrie (Spain) Rafael Nadal	(Italy) Jannik Sinner (Belgium) David Goffin (Chile) Cristian Garín (United States) Taylor Fritz
27 Jun; 4 Jul	Wimbledon; London, United Kingdom; Grand Slam; Grass – £18,652,000; 128S/128Q/64D/32X; Singles – Doubles – Mixed	(Australia) Matthew Ebden (Australia) Max Purcell; 7–6^{(7–5)}, 6–7^{(3–7)}, 4–6, 6–4, 7–6^{(10–2)}	(Croatia) Nikola Mektić (Croatia) Mate Pavić	(United Kingdom) Cameron Norrie (Spain) Rafael Nadal	(Italy) Jannik Sinner (Belgium) David Goffin (Chile) Cristian Garín (United States) Taylor Fritz
27 Jun; 4 Jul	Wimbledon; London, United Kingdom; Grand Slam; Grass – £18,652,000; 128S/128Q/64D/32X; Singles – Doubles – Mixed	(United Kingdom) Neal Skupski (United States) Desirae Krawczyk; 6–4, 6–3	(Australia) Matthew Ebden (Australia) Samantha Stosur	(United Kingdom) Cameron Norrie (Spain) Rafael Nadal	(Italy) Jannik Sinner (Belgium) David Goffin (Chile) Cristian Garín (United States) Taylor Fritz

=== July ===
Week	Tournament	Champions	Runners-up	Semifinalists	Quarterfinalists
11 Jul	Swedish Open; Båstad, Sweden; ATP 250 €597,900 − Clay (red) − 28S/16Q/16D; Singles – Doubles	(Argentina) Francisco Cerúndolo; 7–6^{(7–4)}, 6–2	(Argentina) Sebastián Báez	(Spain) Pablo Carreño Busta; Andrey Rublev	Aslan Karatsev (Argentina) Diego Schwartzman (Austria) Dominic Thiem (Serbia) Laslo Đere
11 Jul	Swedish Open; Båstad, Sweden; ATP 250 €597,900 − Clay (red) − 28S/16Q/16D; Singles – Doubles	(Brazil) Rafael Matos (Spain) David Vega Hernández; 6–4, 3–6, [13–11]	(Italy) Simone Bolelli (Italy) Fabio Fognini	(Spain) Pablo Carreño Busta; Andrey Rublev	Aslan Karatsev (Argentina) Diego Schwartzman (Austria) Dominic Thiem (Serbia) Laslo Đere
11 Jul	Hall of Fame Open; Newport, United States; ATP 250 $665,330 − Grass − 28S/16Q/16D; Singles – Doubles	(United States) Maxime Cressy; 2–6, 6–3, 7–6^{(7–3)}	(Kazakhstan) Alexander Bublik	(Australia) Jason Kubler (United States) John Isner	(Australia) James Duckworth (United Kingdom) Andy Murray (United States) Steve Johnson (France) Benjamin Bonzi
11 Jul	Hall of Fame Open; Newport, United States; ATP 250 $665,330 − Grass − 28S/16Q/16D; Singles – Doubles	(United States) William Blumberg (United States) Steve Johnson; 6–4, 7–5	(South Africa) Raven Klaasen (Brazil) Marcelo Melo	(Australia) Jason Kubler (United States) John Isner	(Australia) James Duckworth (United Kingdom) Andy Murray (United States) Steve Johnson (France) Benjamin Bonzi
18 Jul	Hamburg Open; Hamburg, Germany; ATP 500 €1,911,620 − Clay (red) − 32S/16Q/16D; Singles – Doubles	(Italy) Lorenzo Musetti; 6–4, 6–7^{(6–8)}, 6–4	(Spain) Carlos Alcaraz	(Slovakia) Alex Molčan (Argentina) Francisco Cerúndolo	Karen Khachanov (Croatia) Borna Ćorić (Spain) Alejandro Davidovich; Fokina; Aslan Karatsev
18 Jul	Hamburg Open; Hamburg, Germany; ATP 500 €1,911,620 − Clay (red) − 32S/16Q/16D; Singles – Doubles	(United Kingdom) Lloyd Glasspool (Finland) Harri Heliövaara; 6–2, 6–4	(India) Rohan Bopanna (Netherlands) Matwé Middelkoop	(Slovakia) Alex Molčan (Argentina) Francisco Cerúndolo	Karen Khachanov (Croatia) Borna Ćorić (Spain) Alejandro Davidovich; Fokina; Aslan Karatsev
18 Jul	Swiss Open; Gstaad, Switzerland; ATP 250 €597,900 − Clay (red) − 28S/16Q/16D; Singles – Doubles	(Norway) Casper Ruud; 4–6, 7–6^{(7–4)}, 6–2	(Italy) Matteo Berrettini	(Spain) Albert Ramos Viñolas (Austria) Dominic Thiem	(Spain) Jaume Munar (Chile) Nicolás Jarry (Peru) Juan Pablo Varillas (Spain) Pedro Martínez
18 Jul	Swiss Open; Gstaad, Switzerland; ATP 250 €597,900 − Clay (red) − 28S/16Q/16D; Singles – Doubles	(Bosnia and Herzegovina) Tomislav Brkić (Portugal) Francisco Cabral; 6–4, 6–4	(Netherlands) Robin Haase (Austria) Philipp Oswald	(Spain) Albert Ramos Viñolas (Austria) Dominic Thiem	(Spain) Jaume Munar (Chile) Nicolás Jarry (Peru) Juan Pablo Varillas (Spain) Pedro Martínez
25 Jul	Atlanta Open; Atlanta, United States; ATP 250 $792,980 − Hard − 28S/16Q/16D; Singles – Doubles	(Australia) Alex de Minaur; 6–3, 6–3	(United States) Jenson Brooksby	Ilya Ivashka (United States) Frances Tiafoe	(United States) Tommy Paul (France) Adrian Mannarino (United States) Brandon Nakashima (United States) John Isner
25 Jul	Atlanta Open; Atlanta, United States; ATP 250 $792,980 − Hard − 28S/16Q/16D; Singles – Doubles	(Australia) Thanasi Kokkinakis (Australia) Nick Kyrgios; 7–6^{(7–4)}, 7–5	(Australia) Jason Kubler (Australia) John Peers	Ilya Ivashka (United States) Frances Tiafoe	(United States) Tommy Paul (France) Adrian Mannarino (United States) Brandon Nakashima (United States) John Isner
25 Jul	Austrian Open; Kitzbühel, Austria; ATP 250 €597,900− Clay (red) − 28S/16Q/16D; Singles – Doubles	(Spain) Roberto Bautista Agut; 6–2, 6–2	(Austria) Filip Misolic	(Spain) Albert Ramos Viñolas (Germany) Yannick Hanfmann	(Spain) Pedro Martínez (Czech Republic) Jiří Lehečka (Serbia) Dušan Lajović (Austria) Dominic Thiem
25 Jul	Austrian Open; Kitzbühel, Austria; ATP 250 €597,900− Clay (red) − 28S/16Q/16D; Singles – Doubles	(Spain) Pedro Martínez (Italy) Lorenzo Sonego; 5–7, 6–4, [10–8]	(Germany) Tim Pütz (New Zealand) Michael Venus	(Spain) Albert Ramos Viñolas (Germany) Yannick Hanfmann	(Spain) Pedro Martínez (Czech Republic) Jiří Lehečka (Serbia) Dušan Lajović (Austria) Dominic Thiem
25 Jul	Croatia Open; Umag, Croatia; ATP 250 €597,900 − Clay (red) − 28S/16Q/16D; Singles – Doubles	(Italy) Jannik Sinner; 6–7^{(5–7)}, 6–1, 6–1	(Spain) Carlos Alcaraz	(Italy) Giulio Zeppieri (Italy) Franco Agamenone	(Argentina) Facundo Bagnis (Spain) Bernabé Zapata Miralles (Italy) Marco Cecchinato (Spain) Roberto Carballés Baena
25 Jul	Croatia Open; Umag, Croatia; ATP 250 €597,900 − Clay (red) − 28S/16Q/16D; Singles – Doubles	(Italy) Simone Bolelli (Italy) Fabio Fognini; 5–7, 7–6^{(8–6)}, [10–7]	(United Kingdom) Lloyd Glasspool (Finland) Harri Heliövaara	(Italy) Giulio Zeppieri (Italy) Franco Agamenone	(Argentina) Facundo Bagnis (Spain) Bernabé Zapata Miralles (Italy) Marco Cecchinato (Spain) Roberto Carballés Baena

=== August ===
Week	Tournament	Champions	Runners-up	Semifinalists	Quarterfinalists
1 Aug	Washington Open; Washington, D.C., United States; ATP 500; Hard − $2,108,110 − 48S/16Q/16D; Singles – Doubles	(Australia) Nick Kyrgios; 6–4, 6–3	(Japan) Yoshihito Nishioka	Andrey Rublev (Sweden) Mikael Ymer	(United States) J. J. Wolf (United Kingdom) Dan Evans (United States) Frances Tiafoe (United States) Sebastian Korda
1 Aug	Washington Open; Washington, D.C., United States; ATP 500; Hard − $2,108,110 − 48S/16Q/16D; Singles – Doubles	(Australia) Nick Kyrgios (United States) Jack Sock; 7–5, 6–4	(Croatia) Ivan Dodig (United States) Austin Krajicek	Andrey Rublev (Sweden) Mikael Ymer	(United States) J. J. Wolf (United Kingdom) Dan Evans (United States) Frances Tiafoe (United States) Sebastian Korda
1 Aug	Los Cabos Open; Cabo San Lucas, Mexico; ATP 250; Hard − $822,110 − 28S/16Q/16D; Singles – Doubles	Daniil Medvedev; 7–5, 6–0	(United Kingdom) Cameron Norrie	(Serbia) Miomir Kecmanović (Canada) Félix Auger-Aliassime	(Lithuania) Ričardas Berankis (United States) Brandon Nakashima (Moldova) Radu Albot (United States) Steve Johnson
1 Aug	Los Cabos Open; Cabo San Lucas, Mexico; ATP 250; Hard − $822,110 − 28S/16Q/16D; Singles – Doubles	(United States) William Blumberg (Serbia) Miomir Kecmanović; 6–0, 6–1	(South Africa) Raven Klaasen (Brazil) Marcelo Melo	(Serbia) Miomir Kecmanović (Canada) Félix Auger-Aliassime	(Lithuania) Ričardas Berankis (United States) Brandon Nakashima (Moldova) Radu Albot (United States) Steve Johnson
8 Aug	Canadian Open; Montreal, Canada; ATP Masters 1000; Hard − $5,926,545 − 56S/28Q/28D; Singles – Doubles	(Spain) Pablo Carreño Busta; 3–6, 6–3, 6–3	(Poland) Hubert Hurkacz	(Norway) Casper Ruud (United Kingdom) Dan Evans	(Australia) Nick Kyrgios (Canada) Félix Auger-Aliassime (United Kingdom) Jack Draper (United States) Tommy Paul
8 Aug	Canadian Open; Montreal, Canada; ATP Masters 1000; Hard − $5,926,545 − 56S/28Q/28D; Singles – Doubles	(Netherlands) Wesley Koolhof (United Kingdom) Neal Skupski; 6–2, 4–6, [10–6]	(United Kingdom) Dan Evans (Australia) John Peers	(Norway) Casper Ruud (United Kingdom) Dan Evans	(Australia) Nick Kyrgios (Canada) Félix Auger-Aliassime (United Kingdom) Jack Draper (United States) Tommy Paul
15 Aug	Cincinnati Open; Mason, United States; ATP Masters 1000; Hard − $6,280,880 − 56S/28Q/28D; Singles – Doubles	(Croatia) Borna Ćorić; 7–6^{(7–0)}, 6–2	(Greece) Stefanos Tsitsipas	Daniil Medvedev (United Kingdom) Cameron Norrie	(United States) Taylor Fritz (United States) John Isner (Spain) Carlos Alcaraz (Canada) Félix Auger-Aliassime
15 Aug	Cincinnati Open; Mason, United States; ATP Masters 1000; Hard − $6,280,880 − 56S/28Q/28D; Singles – Doubles	(United States) Rajeev Ram (United Kingdom) Joe Salisbury; 7–6^{(7–4)}, 7–6^{(7–5)}	(Germany) Tim Pütz (New Zealand) Michael Venus	Daniil Medvedev (United Kingdom) Cameron Norrie	(United States) Taylor Fritz (United States) John Isner (Spain) Carlos Alcaraz (Canada) Félix Auger-Aliassime
22 Aug	Winston-Salem Open; Winston-Salem, United States; ATP 250; Hard − $823,420 − 48S/16Q/16D; Singles – Doubles	(France) Adrian Mannarino; 7–6^{(7–1)}, 6–4	(Serbia) Laslo Đere	(Switzerland) Marc-Andrea Hüsler (Netherlands) Botic van de Zandschulp	(United Kingdom) Jack Draper (France) Richard Gasquet (United States) Maxime Cressy (France) Benjamin Bonzi
22 Aug	Winston-Salem Open; Winston-Salem, United States; ATP 250; Hard − $823,420 − 48S/16Q/16D; Singles – Doubles	(Australia) Matthew Ebden (United Kingdom) Jamie Murray; 6–4, 6–2	(Monaco) Hugo Nys (Poland) Jan Zieliński	(Switzerland) Marc-Andrea Hüsler (Netherlands) Botic van de Zandschulp	(United Kingdom) Jack Draper (France) Richard Gasquet (United States) Maxime Cressy (France) Benjamin Bonzi
29 Aug; 5 Sep	US Open; New York City, United States; Grand Slam; Hard − $27,915,200; 128S/128Q/64D/32X; Singles – Doubles – Mixed	(Spain) Carlos Alcaraz; 6–4, 2–6, 7–6^{(7–1)}, 6–3	(Norway) Casper Ruud	Karen Khachanov (United States) Frances Tiafoe	(Australia) Nick Kyrgios (Italy) Matteo Berrettini (Italy) Jannik Sinner; Andrey Rublev
29 Aug; 5 Sep	US Open; New York City, United States; Grand Slam; Hard − $27,915,200; 128S/128Q/64D/32X; Singles – Doubles – Mixed	(United States) Rajeev Ram (United Kingdom) Joe Salisbury; 7–6^{(7–4)}, 7–5	(Netherlands) Wesley Koolhof (United Kingdom) Neal Skupski	Karen Khachanov (United States) Frances Tiafoe	(Australia) Nick Kyrgios (Italy) Matteo Berrettini (Italy) Jannik Sinner; Andrey Rublev
29 Aug; 5 Sep	US Open; New York City, United States; Grand Slam; Hard − $27,915,200; 128S/128Q/64D/32X; Singles – Doubles – Mixed	(Australia) Storm Sanders (Australia) John Peers; 4–6, 6–4, [10–7]	(Belgium) Kirsten Flipkens (France) Édouard Roger-Vasselin	Karen Khachanov (United States) Frances Tiafoe	(Australia) Nick Kyrgios (Italy) Matteo Berrettini (Italy) Jannik Sinner; Andrey Rublev

=== September ===
Week	Tournament	Champions	Runners-up	Semifinalists	Quarterfinalists
12 Sep	Davis Cup Group stage Bologna, Italy; Glasgow, United Kingdom; Hamburg, Germany; Valencia, Spain; Hard (i) – 16 teams	Italy; Spain; Germany; Netherlands	Croatia; Canada; Australia; United States		
19 Sep	Laver Cup; London, United Kingdom; Hard (i) – $2,250,000	Team World; 13–8	Team Europe		
19 Sep	Moselle Open; Metz, France; ATP 250; Hard (i) – €597,900 – 28S/16Q/16D; Singles – Doubles	(Italy) Lorenzo Sonego; 7–6^{(7–3)}, 6–2	(Kazakhstan) Alexander Bublik	(Switzerland) Stan Wawrinka (Poland) Hubert Hurkacz	(Sweden) Mikael Ymer (Denmark) Holger Rune (United States) Sebastian Korda (France) Arthur Rinderknech
19 Sep	Moselle Open; Metz, France; ATP 250; Hard (i) – €597,900 – 28S/16Q/16D; Singles – Doubles	(Monaco) Hugo Nys (Poland) Jan Zieliński; 7–6^{(7–5)}, 6–4	(United Kingdom) Lloyd Glasspool (Finland) Harri Heliövaara	(Switzerland) Stan Wawrinka (Poland) Hubert Hurkacz	(Sweden) Mikael Ymer (Denmark) Holger Rune (United States) Sebastian Korda (France) Arthur Rinderknech
19 Sep	San Diego Open; San Diego, United States; ATP 250; Hard – $661,800 – 28S/16Q/16D; Singles – Doubles	(United States) Brandon Nakashima; 6–4, 6–4	(United States) Marcos Giron	(United Kingdom) Dan Evans (Australia) Christopher O'Connell	(France) Constant Lestienne (Australia) James Duckworth (Colombia) Daniel Elahi Galán (United States) Jenson Brooksby
19 Sep	San Diego Open; San Diego, United States; ATP 250; Hard – $661,800 – 28S/16Q/16D; Singles – Doubles	(United States) Nathaniel Lammons (United States) Jackson Withrow; 7–6^{(7–5)}, 6–2	(Australia) Jason Kubler (Australia) Luke Saville	(United Kingdom) Dan Evans (Australia) Christopher O'Connell	(France) Constant Lestienne (Australia) James Duckworth (Colombia) Daniel Elahi Galán (United States) Jenson Brooksby
26 Sep	Tel Aviv Open; Tel Aviv, Israel; ATP 250; Hard (i) – $1,019,855 – 28S/16Q/16D; Singles – Doubles	(Serbia) Novak Djokovic; 6–3, 6–4	(Croatia) Marin Čilić	Roman Safiullin (France) Constant Lestienne	(Canada) Vasek Pospisil (France) Arthur Rinderknech (United States) Maxime Cressy (United Kingdom) Liam Broady
26 Sep	Tel Aviv Open; Tel Aviv, Israel; ATP 250; Hard (i) – $1,019,855 – 28S/16Q/16D; Singles – Doubles	(India) Rohan Bopanna (Netherlands) Matwé Middelkoop; 6–2, 6–4	(Mexico) Santiago González (Argentina) Andrés Molteni	Roman Safiullin (France) Constant Lestienne	(Canada) Vasek Pospisil (France) Arthur Rinderknech (United States) Maxime Cressy (United Kingdom) Liam Broady
26 Sep	Sofia Open; Sofia, Bulgaria; ATP 250; Hard (i) – €597,900 – 28S/16Q/16D; Singles – Doubles	(Switzerland) Marc-Andrea Hüsler; 6–4, 7–6^{(10–8)}	(Denmark) Holger Rune	(Italy) Jannik Sinner (Italy) Lorenzo Musetti	(Australia) Aleksandar Vukic; Ilya Ivashka (Germany) Jan-Lennard Struff (Poland) Kamil Majchrzak
26 Sep	Sofia Open; Sofia, Bulgaria; ATP 250; Hard (i) – €597,900 – 28S/16Q/16D; Singles – Doubles	(Brazil) Rafael Matos (Spain) David Vega Hernández; 3–6, 7–5, [10–8]	(Germany) Fabian Fallert (Germany) Oscar Otte	(Italy) Jannik Sinner (Italy) Lorenzo Musetti	(Australia) Aleksandar Vukic; Ilya Ivashka (Germany) Jan-Lennard Struff (Poland) Kamil Majchrzak
26 Sep	Korea Open; Seoul, South Korea; ATP 250; Hard – $1,237,570 – 28S/16Q/16D; Singles – Doubles	(Japan) Yoshihito Nishioka; 6–4, 7–6^{(7–5)}	(Canada) Denis Shapovalov	(United States) Aleksandar Kovacevic (United States) Jenson Brooksby	(Norway) Casper Ruud (United States) Mackenzie McDonald (Moldova) Radu Albot (United Kingdom) Cameron Norrie
26 Sep	Korea Open; Seoul, South Korea; ATP 250; Hard – $1,237,570 – 28S/16Q/16D; Singles – Doubles	(South Africa) Raven Klaasen (United States) Nathaniel Lammons; 6–1, 7–5	(Colombia) Nicolás Barrientos (Mexico) Miguel Ángel Reyes-Varela	(United States) Aleksandar Kovacevic (United States) Jenson Brooksby	(Norway) Casper Ruud (United States) Mackenzie McDonald (Moldova) Radu Albot (United Kingdom) Cameron Norrie

=== October ===
Week	Tournament	Champions	Runners-up	Semifinalists	Quarterfinalists
3 Oct	Astana Open; Astana, Kazakhstan; ATP 500; Hard (i) – $2,054,825 – 32S/16Q/16D; Singles – Doubles	(Serbia) Novak Djokovic; 6–3, 6–4	(Greece) Stefanos Tsitsipas	Andrey Rublev; Daniil Medvedev	(France) Adrian Mannarino (Poland) Hubert Hurkacz; Karen Khachanov (Spain) Roberto Bautista Agut
3 Oct	Astana Open; Astana, Kazakhstan; ATP 500; Hard (i) – $2,054,825 – 32S/16Q/16D; Singles – Doubles	(Croatia) Nikola Mektić (Croatia) Mate Pavić; 6–4, 6–2	(France) Adrian Mannarino (France) Fabrice Martin	Andrey Rublev; Daniil Medvedev	(France) Adrian Mannarino (Poland) Hubert Hurkacz; Karen Khachanov (Spain) Roberto Bautista Agut
3 Oct	Japan Open; Tokyo, Japan; ATP 500; Hard – $2,108,110 – 32S/16Q/16D; Singles – Doubles	(United States) Taylor Fritz; 7–6^{(7–3)}, 7–6^{(7–2)}	(United States) Frances Tiafoe	(South Korea) Kwon Soon-woo (Canada) Denis Shapovalov	(Spain) Pedro Martínez (Serbia) Miomir Kecmanović (Australia) Nick Kyrgios (Croatia) Borna Ćorić
3 Oct	Japan Open; Tokyo, Japan; ATP 500; Hard – $2,108,110 – 32S/16Q/16D; Singles – Doubles	(United States) Mackenzie McDonald (Brazil) Marcelo Melo; 6–4, 3–6, [10–4]	(Brazil) Rafael Matos (Spain) David Vega Hernández	(South Korea) Kwon Soon-woo (Canada) Denis Shapovalov	(Spain) Pedro Martínez (Serbia) Miomir Kecmanović (Australia) Nick Kyrgios (Croatia) Borna Ćorić
10 Oct	Firenze Open; Florence, Italy; ATP 250; Hard (i) – €725,540 – 28S/16Q/16D; Singles – Doubles	(Canada) Félix Auger-Aliassime; 6–4, 6–4	(United States) J. J. Wolf	(Italy) Lorenzo Musetti (Sweden) Mikael Ymer	(United States) Brandon Nakashima (United States) Mackenzie McDonald (Kazakhstan) Alexander Bublik (Spain) Roberto Carballés Baena
10 Oct	Firenze Open; Florence, Italy; ATP 250; Hard (i) – €725,540 – 28S/16Q/16D; Singles – Doubles	(France) Nicolas Mahut (France) Édouard Roger-Vasselin; 7–6^{(7–4)}, 6–3	(Croatia) Ivan Dodig (United States) Austin Krajicek	(Italy) Lorenzo Musetti (Sweden) Mikael Ymer	(United States) Brandon Nakashima (United States) Mackenzie McDonald (Kazakhstan) Alexander Bublik (Spain) Roberto Carballés Baena
10 Oct	Gijón Open; Gijón, Spain; ATP 250; Hard (i) – €725,540 – 28S/16Q/16D; Singles – Doubles	Andrey Rublev; 6–2, 6–3	(United States) Sebastian Korda	(Austria) Dominic Thiem (France) Arthur Rinderknech	(United States) Tommy Paul (Argentina) Francisco Cerúndolo (United Kingdom) Andy Murray (Spain) Pablo Carreño Busta
10 Oct	Gijón Open; Gijón, Spain; ATP 250; Hard (i) – €725,540 – 28S/16Q/16D; Singles – Doubles	(Argentina) Máximo González (Argentina) Andrés Molteni; 6–7^{(6–8)}, 7–6^{(7–4)}, [10–5]	(United States) Nathaniel Lammons (United States) Jackson Withrow	(Austria) Dominic Thiem (France) Arthur Rinderknech	(United States) Tommy Paul (Argentina) Francisco Cerúndolo (United Kingdom) Andy Murray (Spain) Pablo Carreño Busta
17 Oct	European Open; Antwerp, Belgium; ATP 250; Hard (i) – €725,540 – 28S/16Q/16D; Singles – Doubles	(Canada) Félix Auger-Aliassime; 6–3, 6–4	(United States) Sebastian Korda	(Austria) Dominic Thiem (France) Richard Gasquet	(Poland) Hubert Hurkacz (Japan) Yoshihito Nishioka (Belgium) David Goffin (United Kingdom) Dan Evans
17 Oct	European Open; Antwerp, Belgium; ATP 250; Hard (i) – €725,540 – 28S/16Q/16D; Singles – Doubles	(Netherlands) Tallon Griekspoor (Netherlands) Botic van de Zandschulp; 3–6, 6–3, [10–5]	(India) Rohan Bopanna (Netherlands) Matwé Middelkoop	(Austria) Dominic Thiem (France) Richard Gasquet	(Poland) Hubert Hurkacz (Japan) Yoshihito Nishioka (Belgium) David Goffin (United Kingdom) Dan Evans
17 Oct	Stockholm Open; Stockholm, Sweden; ATP 250; Hard (i) – €725,540 – 28S/16Q/16D; Singles – Doubles	(Denmark) Holger Rune; 6–4, 6–4	(Greece) Stefanos Tsitsipas	(Finland) Emil Ruusuvuori (Australia) Alex de Minaur	(Sweden) Mikael Ymer (United States) Frances Tiafoe (Canada) Denis Shapovalov (United Kingdom) Cameron Norrie
17 Oct	Stockholm Open; Stockholm, Sweden; ATP 250; Hard (i) – €725,540 – 28S/16Q/16D; Singles – Doubles	(El Salvador) Marcelo Arévalo (Netherlands) Jean-Julien Rojer; 6–3, 6–3	(United Kingdom) Lloyd Glasspool (Finland) Harri Heliövaara	(Finland) Emil Ruusuvuori (Australia) Alex de Minaur	(Sweden) Mikael Ymer (United States) Frances Tiafoe (Canada) Denis Shapovalov (United Kingdom) Cameron Norrie
17 Oct	Tennis Napoli Cup; Naples, Italy; ATP 250; Hard – €725,540 – 28S/16Q/16D; Singles – Doubles	(Italy) Lorenzo Musetti; 7–6^{(7–5)}, 6–2	(Italy) Matteo Berrettini	(Serbia) Miomir Kecmanović (United States) Mackenzie McDonald	(Spain) Pablo Carreño Busta (Colombia) Daniel Elahi Galán (China) Zhang Zhizhen (Japan) Taro Daniel
17 Oct	Tennis Napoli Cup; Naples, Italy; ATP 250; Hard – €725,540 – 28S/16Q/16D; Singles – Doubles	(Croatia) Ivan Dodig (United States) Austin Krajicek; 6–3, 1–6, [10–8]	(Australia) Matthew Ebden (Australia) John Peers	(Serbia) Miomir Kecmanović (United States) Mackenzie McDonald	(Spain) Pablo Carreño Busta (Colombia) Daniel Elahi Galán (China) Zhang Zhizhen (Japan) Taro Daniel
24 Oct	Swiss Indoors; Basel, Switzerland; ATP 500; Hard (i) – €2,276,105 – 32S/16Q/16D; Singles – Doubles	(Canada) Félix Auger-Aliassime; 6–3, 7–5	(Denmark) Holger Rune	(Spain) Carlos Alcaraz (Spain) Roberto Bautista Agut	(Spain) Pablo Carreño Busta (Kazakhstan) Alexander Bublik (France) Arthur Rinderknech (Switzerland) Stan Wawrinka
24 Oct	Swiss Indoors; Basel, Switzerland; ATP 500; Hard (i) – €2,276,105 – 32S/16Q/16D; Singles – Doubles	(Croatia) Ivan Dodig (United States) Austin Krajicek; 6–4, 7–6^{(7–5)}	(France) Nicolas Mahut (France) Édouard Roger-Vasselin	(Spain) Carlos Alcaraz (Spain) Roberto Bautista Agut	(Spain) Pablo Carreño Busta (Kazakhstan) Alexander Bublik (France) Arthur Rinderknech (Switzerland) Stan Wawrinka
24 Oct	Vienna Open; Vienna, Austria; ATP 500; Hard (i) – €2,489,935 – 32S/16Q/16D; Singles – Doubles	Daniil Medvedev; 4–6, 6–3, 6–2	(Canada) Denis Shapovalov	(Bulgaria) Grigor Dimitrov (Croatia) Borna Ćorić	(Italy) Jannik Sinner (United States) Marcos Giron (United Kingdom) Dan Evans (Poland) Hubert Hurkacz
24 Oct	Vienna Open; Vienna, Austria; ATP 500; Hard (i) – €2,489,935 – 32S/16Q/16D; Singles – Doubles	(Austria) Alexander Erler (Austria) Lucas Miedler; 6–3, 7–6^{(7–1)}	(Mexico) Santiago González (Argentina) Andrés Molteni	(Bulgaria) Grigor Dimitrov (Croatia) Borna Ćorić	(Italy) Jannik Sinner (United States) Marcos Giron (United Kingdom) Dan Evans (Poland) Hubert Hurkacz
31 Oct	Paris Masters; Paris, France; ATP Masters 1000; Hard (i) – €5,415,410 – 56S/28Q/24D; Singles – Doubles	(Denmark) Holger Rune; 3–6, 6–3, 7–5	(Serbia) Novak Djokovic	(Canada) Félix Auger-Aliassime (Greece) Stefanos Tsitsipas	(Spain) Carlos Alcaraz (United States) Frances Tiafoe (Italy) Lorenzo Musetti (United States) Tommy Paul
31 Oct	Paris Masters; Paris, France; ATP Masters 1000; Hard (i) – €5,415,410 – 56S/28Q/24D; Singles – Doubles	(Netherlands) Wesley Koolhof (United Kingdom) Neal Skupski; 7–6^{(7–5)}, 6–4	(Croatia) Ivan Dodig (United States) Austin Krajicek	(Canada) Félix Auger-Aliassime (Greece) Stefanos Tsitsipas	(Spain) Carlos Alcaraz (United States) Frances Tiafoe (Italy) Lorenzo Musetti (United States) Tommy Paul

=== November ===
Week	Tournament	Champions	Runners-up	Semifinalists	Quarterfinalists
7 Nov	Next Gen ATP Finals; Milan, Italy; Next Generation ATP Finals; Hard (i) – $1,400,000 – 8S (RR); Singles	(United States) Brandon Nakashima; 4–3^{(7–5)}, 4–3^{(8–6)}, 4–2	(Czech Republic) Jiří Lehečka	(United Kingdom) Jack Draper (Switzerland) Dominic Stricker	Round robin (Italy) Francesco Passaro (Italy) Matteo Arnaldi (Italy) Lorenzo Musetti (Chinese Taipei) Tseng Chun-hsin
14 Nov	ATP Finals; Turin, Italy; ATP Finals; Hard (i) – $14,750,000 – 8S/8D (RR); Singles – Doubles	(Serbia) Novak Djokovic; 7–5, 6–3	(Norway) Casper Ruud	Andrey Rublev (United States) Taylor Fritz	Round robin (Canada) Félix Auger-Aliassime (Greece) Stefanos Tsitsipas (Spain) Rafael Nadal; Daniil Medvedev
14 Nov	ATP Finals; Turin, Italy; ATP Finals; Hard (i) – $14,750,000 – 8S/8D (RR); Singles – Doubles	(United States) Rajeev Ram (United Kingdom) Joe Salisbury; 7–6^{(7–4)}, 6–4	(Croatia) Nikola Mektić (Croatia) Mate Pavić	Andrey Rublev (United States) Taylor Fritz	Round robin (Canada) Félix Auger-Aliassime (Greece) Stefanos Tsitsipas (Spain) Rafael Nadal; Daniil Medvedev
21 Nov	Davis Cup Finals Knockout stage Málaga, Spain; Hard (i)	Canada; 2–0	Australia	Italy; Croatia	United States; Germany; Netherlands; Spain

=== Affected tournaments ===
Week of	Tournament	Status
10 Jan	Auckland Open; Auckland, New Zealand; ATP Tour 250; Hard	Cancelled due to the COVID-19 pandemic
19 Sept	Astana Open; Astana, Kazakhstan; ATP Tour 250; Hard (i)	Upgraded to 500 tournament, moved to October 3
26 Sep	Chengdu Open; Chengdu, China; ATP Tour 250; Hard	Cancelled due to ongoing restrictions related to COVID-19
26 Sep	Zhuhai Championships; Zhuhai, China; ATP Tour 250; Hard	Cancelled due to ongoing restrictions related to COVID-19
3 Oct	China Open; Beijing, China; ATP Tour 500; Hard	Cancelled due to ongoing restrictions related to COVID-19
9 Oct	Shanghai Masters; Shanghai, China; ATP Tour Masters 1000; Hard	Cancelled due to ongoing restrictions related to COVID-19
17 Oct	Kremlin Cup; Moscow, Russia; ATP Tour 250; Hard (i)	Suspended indefinitely due to the Russian invasion of Ukraine
7 Nov	St. Petersburg Open; St. Petersburg, Russia; ATP Tour 250; Hard (i)	Suspended indefinitely due to the Russian invasion of Ukraine

== Statistical information ==
These tables present the number of singles (S), doubles (D), and mixed doubles (X) titles won by each player and each nation during the season, within all the tournament categories of the 2022 calendar : the Grand Slam tournaments, the ATP Finals, the ATP Tour Masters 1000, the ATP Tour 500 tournaments, and the ATP Tour 250 tournaments. The players/nations are sorted by:

1. Total number of titles (a doubles title won by two players representing the same nation counts as only one win for the nation);
2. Cumulated importance of those titles (one Grand Slam win equalling two Masters 1000 wins, one undefeated ATP Finals win equalling one-and-a-half Masters 1000 win, one Masters 1000 win equalling two 500 events wins, one 500 event win equalling two 250 events wins);
3. A singles > doubles > mixed doubles hierarchy;
4. Alphabetical order (by family names for players).

Key
Grand Slam tournaments
ATP Finals
ATP Masters 1000
ATP 500
ATP 250

=== Titles won by player ===
Total	Player	Grand Slam			ATP Finals		ATP Masters 1000		ATP 500		ATP 250		Total		
Total	Player	S	D	X	S	D	S	D	S	D	S	D	S	D	X
8	Wesley Koolhof (NED)			●				● ● ●				● ● ● ●	0	7	1
8	Neal Skupski (GBR)			●				● ● ●				● ● ● ●	0	7	1
6	Mate Pavić (CRO)							●		● ●		● ● ●	0	6	0
5	Novak Djokovic (SRB)	●			●		●		●		●		5	0	0
5	Carlos Alcaraz (ESP)	●					● ●		● ●				5	0	0
5	Nikola Mektić (CRO)							●		● ●		● ●	0	5	0
5	Andrey Rublev (25x17px) (Note: As of 1 March 2022, the ATP announced that players from Russia and Belarus will not compete in tournaments under the name or flag of Russia or Belarus due to the Russian invasion of Ukraine.)								●		● ● ●	●	4	1	0
5	Rafael Matos (BRA)											● ● ● ● ●	0	5	0
4	Rafael Nadal (ESP)	● ●							●		●		4	0	0
4	Rajeev Ram (USA)		●			●		● ●					0	4	0
4	Joe Salisbury (GBR)		●			●		● ●					0	4	0
4	Nick Kyrgios (AUS)		●						●	●		●	1	3	0
4	Marcelo Arévalo (ESA)		●									● ● ●	0	4	0
4	Jean-Julien Rojer (NED)		●									● ● ●	0	4	0
4	Ivan Dodig (CRO)			●						●		● ●	0	3	1
4	Félix Auger-Aliassime (CAN)								● ●		● ●		4	0	0
4	David Vega Hernández (ESP)											● ● ● ●	0	4	0
3	Thanasi Kokkinakis (AUS)		●								●	●	1	2	0
3	Matthew Ebden (AUS)		●									● ●	0	3	0
3	Taylor Fritz (USA)						●		●		●		3	0	0
3	Stefanos Tsitsipas (GRE)						●			●	●		2	1	0
3	Holger Rune (DEN)						●				● ●		3	0	0
3	Hubert Hurkacz (POL)							●	●			●	1	2	0
3	Austin Krajicek (USA)									●		● ●	0	3	0
3	Casper Ruud (NOR)										● ● ●		3	0	0
3	Rohan Bopanna (IND)											● ● ●	0	3	0
3	Andrés Molteni (ARG)											● ● ●	0	3	0
2	Max Purcell (AUS)		●									●	0	2	0
2	John Peers (AUS)			●								●	0	1	1
2	John Isner (USA)							● ●					0	2	0
2	Jack Sock (USA)							●		●			0	2	0
2	Matteo Berrettini (ITA)								●		●		2	0	0
2	Daniil Medvedev (25x17px)								●		●		2	0	0
2	Lorenzo Musetti (ITA)								●		●		2	0	0
2	Simone Bolelli (ITA)									●		●	0	2	0
2	Fabio Fognini (ITA)									●		●	0	2	0
2	Kevin Krawietz (GER)									●		●	0	2	0
2	Matwé Middelkoop (NED)									●		●	0	2	0
2	Andreas Mies (GER)									●		●	0	2	0
2	Roberto Bautista Agut (ESP)										● ●		2	0	0
2	Cameron Norrie (GBR)										● ●		2	0	0
2	Reilly Opelka (USA)										● ●		2	0	0
2	Pedro Martínez (ESP)										●	●	1	1	0
2	Lorenzo Sonego (ITA)										●	●	1	1	0
2	William Blumberg (USA)											● ●	0	2	0
2	Francisco Cabral (POR)											● ●	0	2	0
2	Santiago González (MEX)											● ●	0	2	0
2	Nathaniel Lammons (USA)											● ●	0	2	0
2	Nicolas Mahut (FRA)											● ●	0	2	0
2	Ramkumar Ramanathan (IND)											● ●	0	2	0
1	Pablo Carreño Busta (ESP)						●						1	0	0
1	Borna Ćorić (CRO)						●						1	0	0
1	Alexander Erler (AUT)									●			0	1	0
1	Lloyd Glasspool (GBR)									●			0	1	0
1	Marcel Granollers (ESP)									●			0	1	0
1	Robin Haase (NED)									●			0	1	0
1	Harri Heliövaara (FIN)									●			0	1	0
1	Feliciano López (ESP)									●			0	1	0
1	Mackenzie McDonald (USA)									●			0	1	0
1	Marcelo Melo (BRA)									●			0	1	0
1	Lucas Miedler (AUT)									●			0	1	0
1	Tim Pütz (GER)									●			0	1	0
1	Michael Venus (NZL)									●			0	1	0
1	Horacio Zeballos (ARG)									●			0	1	0
1	Sebastián Báez (ARG)										●		1	0	0
1	Alexander Bublik (KAZ)										●		1	0	0
1	Francisco Cerúndolo (ARG)										●		1	0	0
1	Maxime Cressy (USA)										●		1	0	0
1	Alex de Minaur (AUS)										●		1	0	0
1	David Goffin (BEL)										●		1	0	0
1	Marc-Andrea Hüsler (SUI)										●		1	0	0
1	Aslan Karatsev (25x17px)										●		1	0	0
1	Adrian Mannarino (FRA)										●		1	0	0
1	Gaël Monfils (FRA)										●		1	0	0
1	Brandon Nakashima (USA)										●		1	0	0
1	Yoshihito Nishioka (JPN)										●		1	0	0
1	Albert Ramos Viñolas (ESP)										●		1	0	0
1	Jannik Sinner (ITA)										●		1	0	0
1	João Sousa (POR)										●		1	0	0
1	Tim van Rijthoven (NED)										●		1	0	0
1	Ariel Behar (URU)											●	0	1	0
1	Nuno Borges (POR)											●	0	1	0
1	Tomislav Brkić (BIH)											●	0	1	0
1	Gonzalo Escobar (ECU)											●	0	1	0
1	Máximo González (ARG)											●	0	1	0
1	Tallon Griekspoor (NED)											●	0	1	0
1	Pierre-Hugues Herbert (FRA)											●	0	1	0
1	Steve Johnson (USA)											●	0	1	0
1	Miomir Kecmanović (SRB)											●	0	1	0
1	Raven Klaasen (RSA)											●	0	1	0
1	Felipe Meligeni Alves (BRA)											●	0	1	0
1	Denys Molchanov (UKR)											●	0	1	0
1	Jamie Murray (GBR)											●	0	1	0
1	Hugo Nys (MON)											●	0	1	0
1	Filip Polášek (SVK)											●	0	1	0
1	Édouard Roger-Vasselin (FRA)											●	0	1	0
1	Botic van de Zandschulp (NED)											●	0	1	0
1	Jackson Withrow (USA)											●	0	1	0
1	Jan Zieliński (POL)											●	0	1	0

=== Titles won by nation ===
Total	Nation	Grand Slam			ATP Finals		ATP Masters 1000		ATP 500		ATP 250		Total		
Total	Nation	S	D	X	S	D	S	D	S	D	S	D	S	D	X
22	United States (USA)		1			1	1	4	1	3	5	6	7	15	0
21	Spain (ESP)	3					3		3	2	5	5	14	7	0
16	Great Britain (GBR)		1	1		1		5		1	2	5	2	13	1
16	Netherlands (NED)		1	1				3		1	1	9	1	14	1
11	Australia (AUS)		2	1					1	1	2	4	3	7	1
10	Croatia (CRO)			1			1	1		3		4	1	8	1
9	Italy (ITA)								2	1	4	2	6	3	0
6	Serbia (SRB)	1			1		1		1		1	1	5	1	0
6	Argentina (ARG)									1	2	3	2	4	0
6	Brazil (BRA)									1		5	0	6	0
4	El Salvador (ESA)		1									3	0	4	0
4	Poland (POL)							1	1			2	1	3	0
4	Canada (CAN)								2		2		4	0	0
4	Russia (RUS)								1		2	1	3	1	0
4	France (FRA)										2	2	2	2	0
3	Greece (GRE)						1			1	1		2	1	0
3	Denmark (DEN)						1				2		3	0	0
3	Germany (GER)									2		1	0	3	0
3	Norway (NOR)										3		3	0	0
3	Portugal (POR)										1	2	1	2	0
3	India (IND)											3	0	3	0
2	Mexico (MEX)											2	0	2	0
1	Austria (AUT)									1			0	1	0
1	Finland (FIN)									1			0	1	0
1	New Zealand (NZL)									1			0	1	0
1	Belgium (BEL)										1		1	0	0
1	Japan (JPN)										1		1	0	0
1	Kazakhstan (KAZ)										1		1	0	0
1	Switzerland (SUI)										1		1	0	0
1	Bosnia and Herzegovina (BIH)											1	0	1	0
1	Ecuador (ECU)											1	0	1	0
1	Monaco (MON)											1	0	1	0
1	Slovakia (SVK)											1	0	1	0
1	South Africa (RSA)											1	0	1	0
1	Ukraine (UKR)											1	0	1	0
1	Uruguay (URU)											1	0	1	0

=== Titles information ===
The following players won their first main circuit title in singles, doubles or mixed doubles:

Singles

- (Australia) Thanasi Kokkinakis (25 years, 280 days) – Adelaide 2 (draw)
- (Kazakhstan) Alexander Bublik (24 years, 234 days) – Montpellier (draw)
- (Canada) Félix Auger-Aliassime (21 years, 189 days) – Rotterdam (draw)
- (Spain) Pedro Martínez (24 years, 307 days) – Santiago (draw)
- (Denmark) Holger Rune (19 years, 2 days) – Munich (draw)
- (Argentina) Sebastián Báez (21 years, 124 days) – Estoril (draw)
- (Netherlands) Tim van Rijthoven (25 years, 49 days) – 's-Hertogenbosch (draw)
- (Argentina) Francisco Cerúndolo (23 years, 338 days) – Båstad (draw)
- (United States) Maxime Cressy (25 years, 70 days) – Newport (draw)
- (Italy) Lorenzo Musetti (20 years, 143 days) – Hamburg (draw)
- (United States) Brandon Nakashima (21 years, 53 days) – San Diego (draw)
- (Switzerland) Marc-Andrea Hüsler (26 years, 100 days) – Sofia (draw)

Doubles

- (India) Ramkumar Ramanathan (27 years, 62 days) – Adelaide 1 (draw)
- (Ukraine) Denys Molchanov (34 years, 280 days) – Marseille (draw)
- (Greece) Stefanos Tsitsipas (23 years, 198 days) – Acapulco (draw)
- (Australia) Max Purcell (24 years, 7 days) – Houston (draw)
- (Portugal) Nuno Borges (25 years, 71 days) – Estoril (draw)
- (Portugal) Francisco Cabral (25 years, 113 days) – Estoril (draw)
- (Spain) Pedro Martínez (25 years, 96 days) – Kitzbühel (draw)
- (Serbia) Miomir Kecmanović (22 years, 340 days) – Los Cabos (draw)
- (United States) Nathaniel Lammons (29 years, 44 days) – San Diego (draw)
- (United States) Mackenzie McDonald (27 years, 176 days) – Tokyo (draw)
- (Netherlands) Tallon Griekspoor (26 years, 113 days) – Antwerp (draw)
- (Netherlands) Botic van de Zandschulp (27 years, 19 days) – Antwerp (draw)

Mixed doubles

- (Netherlands) Wesley Koolhof (33 years, 46 days) – **French Open (draw)**
- (Australia) John Peers (34 years, 47 days) – **US Open (draw)**

The following players defended a main circuit title in singles, doubles, or mixed doubles:

Singles

- (Greece) Stefanos Tsitsipas – Monte-Carlo (draw)
- (Norway) Casper Ruud – Geneva (draw), Gstaad (draw)
- (Italy) Matteo Berrettini – Queen's Club (draw)
- (Serbia) Novak Djokovic – **Wimbledon Championships (draw)**

Doubles

- (Germany) Kevin Krawietz – Munich (draw)
- (Croatia) Nikola Mektić – Rome (draw), Eastbourne (draw)
- (Croatia) Mate Pavić – Rome (draw), Eastbourne (draw)
- (United States) William Blumberg – Newport (draw)
- (United States) Rajeev Ram – **US Open (draw)**
- (United Kingdom) Joe Salisbury – **US Open (draw)**
- (Poland) Jan Zieliński – Moselle Open (draw)

Mixed doubles

- (United Kingdom) Neal Skupski – **Wimbledon Championships (draw)**

=== Best ranking ===
The following players achieved their career high ranking in this season inside top 50 (in bold the players who entered the top 10 or became the world No. 1 for the first time): (Note: Name and ranking in bold means the player entered top 10 or became world No. 1 for the first time, and only the ranking in bold means the player had entered the top 10 previously but reached a new career high ranking.)

Singles

- (Italy) Matteo Berrettini (reached place **No. 6** on 31 January)
- (Australia) James Duckworth (reached place No. 46 on 31 January)
- (Russia) Aslan Karatsev (reached place No. 14 on 7 February)
- (Kazakhstan) Alexander Bublik (reached place No. 30 on 21 February)
- (Russia) **Daniil Medvedev** (reached place **No. 1** on 28 February)
- (United States) Reilly Opelka (reached place No. 17 on 28 February)
- (Belarus) Ilya Ivashka (reached place No. 41 on 7 March)
- (Spain) Alejandro Davidovich Fokina (reached place No. 27 on 18 April)
- (Spain) Pedro Martínez (reached place No. 42 on 25 April)
- (United States) Sebastian Korda (reached place No. 30 on 2 May)
- (United States) Marcos Giron (reached place No. 49 on 16 May)
- (Slovakia) Alex Molčan (reached place No. 38 on 23 May)
- (Germany) Alexander Zverev (reached place **No. 2** on 13 June)
- (United States) Jenson Brooksby (reached place No. 33 on 13 June)
- (Germany) Oscar Otte (reached place No. 36 on 27 June)
- (France) Benjamin Bonzi (reached place No. 44 on 18 July)
- (Argentina) Francisco Cerúndolo (reached place No. 24 on 25 July)
- (Argentina) Sebastián Báez (reached place No. 31 on 1 August)
- (Netherlands) Tallon Griekspoor (reached place No. 44 on 1 August)
- (United States) Mackenzie McDonald (reached place No. 48 on 1 August)
- (United States) Maxime Cressy (reached place No. 31 on 8 August)
- (Netherlands) Botic van de Zandschulp (reached place No. 22 on 29 August)
- (Spain) **Carlos Alcaraz** (reached place **No. 1** on 12 September)
- (Norway) Casper Ruud (reached place **No. 2** on 12 September)
- (United Kingdom) **Cameron Norrie** (reached place **No. 8** on 12 September)
- (United States) Tommy Paul (reached place No. 28 on 26 September)
- (United States) **Taylor Fritz** (reached place **No. 8** on 10 October)
- (United States) Frances Tiafoe (reached place No. 17 on 10 October)
- (United States) Brandon Nakashima (reached place No. 43 on 17 October)
- (Italy) Lorenzo Musetti (reached place No. 23 on 24 October)
- (Serbia) Miomir Kecmanović (reached place No. 28 on 24 October)
- (France) Arthur Rinderknech (reached place No. 42 on 31 October)
- (Canada) Félix Auger-Aliassime (reached place **No. 6** on 7 November)
- (Denmark) **Holger Rune** (reached place **No. 10** on 7 November)
- (Japan) Yoshihito Nishioka (reached place No. 36 on 7 November)
- (United Kingdom) Jack Draper (reached place No. 41 on 7 November)
- (Finland) Emil Ruusuvuori (reached place No. 40 on 21 November)

Doubles

- (Australia) Matthew Ebden (reached place No. 24 on 31 January)
- (Uruguay) Ariel Behar (reached place No. 39 on 31 January)
- (Mexico) Santiago González (reached place No. 22 on 21 March)
- (Argentina) Andrés Molteni (reached place No. 31 on 21 March)
- (United Kingdom) **Joe Salisbury** (reached place **No. 1** on 4 April)
- (Australia) Max Purcell (reached place No. 25 on 11 April)
- (Kazakhstan) Andrey Golubev (reached place No. 21 on 16 May)
- (Bosnia and Herzegovina) Tomislav Brkić (reached place No. 37 on 23 May)
- (Poland) Hubert Hurkacz (reached place No. 30 on 13 June)
- (United States) John Isner (reached place No. 14 on 18 July)
- (Netherlands) Matwé Middelkoop (reached place No. 22 on 25 July)
- (New Zealand) Michael Venus (reached place **No. 6** on 29 August)
- (Germany) **Tim Pütz** (reached place **No. 7** on 29 August)
- (Portugal) Francisco Cabral (reached place No. 45 on 12 September)
- (United States) **Rajeev Ram** (reached place **No. 1** on 3 October)
- (Netherlands) **Wesley Koolhof** (reached place **No. 1** on 7 November)
- (United States) **Austin Krajicek** (reached place **No. 9** on 7 November)
- (Australia) Nick Kyrgios (reached place No. 11 on 7 November)
- (Spain) David Vega Hernández (reached place No. 31 on 7 November)
- (Poland) Jan Zieliński (reached place No. 34 on 7 November)
- (United States) Nathaniel Lammons (reached place No. 45 on 7 November)
- (Austria) Alexander Erler (reached place No. 47 on 7 November)
- (United Kingdom) **Neal Skupski** (reached place **No. 1** on 14 November)
- (El Salvador) **Marcelo Arévalo** (reached place **No. 5** on 14 November)
- (Brazil) Rafael Matos (reached place No. 27 on 14 November)
- (United States) Jackson Withrow (reached place No. 47 on 14 November)
- (Finland) Harri Heliövaara (reached place No. 11 on 21 November)
- (United Kingdom) Lloyd Glasspool (reached place No. 12 on 21 November)
- (Australia) Thanasi Kokkinakis (reached place No. 15 on 21 November)

== ATP rankings ==
Below are the tables for the yearly ATP Race rankings (Note: The ATP Race rankings measure the points a player (for singles) or team (for doubles) has accumulated over the season leading up to the year-end ATP Finals.) and the ATP rankings (Note: The ATP rankings are the weekly computer ratings defined by the ATP and are based on a rolling, 52-week cumulative system.) of the top 20 singles players, doubles players, and doubles teams.

=== Singles ===
Final Singles Race rankings
#	Player	Points	Tours
1	Carlos Alcaraz (ESP)	6,820	17
2	Rafael Nadal (ESP)	6,020	12
3	Casper Ruud (NOR)	5,820	22
4	Stefanos Tsitsipas (GRE)	5,550	23
5	Novak Djokovic (SRB)	4,820	11
6	Félix Auger-Aliassime (CAN)	4,195	27
7	Daniil Medvedev (RUS)	4,065	18
8	Andrey Rublev (RUS)	3,930	22
9	Taylor Fritz (USA)	3,355	21
10	Holger Rune (DEN)	2,911	30
11	Hubert Hurkacz (POL)	2,905	22
12	Alexander Zverev (GER)	2,700	11
13	Pablo Carreño Busta (ESP)	2,495	25
14	Cameron Norrie (GBR)	2,445	24
15	Jannik Sinner (ITA)	2,410	18
16	Matteo Berrettini (ITA)	2,375	13
17	Marin Čilić (CRO)	2,105	20
18	Denis Shapovalov (CAN)	2,075	25
19	Frances Tiafoe (USA)	2,000	24
20	Karen Khachanov (RUS)	1,990	25

Qualified for the ATP Finals.
Qualified but withdrew from the ATP Finals.

Year-end rankings 2022 (26 December 2022)
#	Player	Points	#Trn	'21 Rk	High	Low	'21→'22
1	Carlos Alcaraz (ESP)	6,820	17	32	1	33	▲31
2	Rafael Nadal (ESP)	6,020	14	6	2	6	▲4
3	Casper Ruud (NOR)	5,820	23	8	2	10	▲5
4	Stefanos Tsitsipas (GRE)	5,550	23	4	3	7	Steady
5	Novak Djokovic (SRB)	4,820	14	1	1	8	▼4
6	Félix Auger-Aliassime (CAN)	4,195	26	11	6	13	▲5
7	Daniil Medvedev (RUS)	4,065	21	2	1	7	▼5
8	Andrey Rublev (RUS)	3,930	23	5	5	11	▼3
9	Taylor Fritz (USA)	3,355	22	23	8	23	▲14
10	Hubert Hurkacz (POL)	2,905	21	9	9	14	▼1
11	Holger Rune (DEN)	2,888	29	103	10	103	▲92
12	Alexander Zverev (GER)	2,700	18	3	2	12	▼9
13	Pablo Carreño Busta (ESP)	2,495	24	20	13	23	▲7
14	Cameron Norrie (GBR)	2,445	23	12	8	14	▼2
15	Jannik Sinner (ITA)	2,410	18	10	10	15	▼5
16	Matteo Berrettini (ITA)	2,375	19	7	6	16	▼9
17	Marin Čilić (CRO)	2,105	20	30	13	30	▲13
18	Denis Shapovalov (CAN)	2,075	23	14	12	24	▼4
19	Frances Tiafoe (USA)	2,000	22	38	17	38	▲19
20	Karen Khachanov (RUS)	1,990	25	29	18	31	▲9

==== No. 1 ranking ====
Holder	Date gained	Date forfeited
Novak Djokovic (SRB)	Year end 2021	27 February 2022
Daniil Medvedev (RUS)	28 February 2022	20 March 2022
Novak Djokovic (SRB)	21 March 2022	12 June 2022
Daniil Medvedev (RUS)	13 June 2022	11 September 2022
Carlos Alcaraz (ESP)	12 September 2022	Year end 2022

=== Doubles ===
Final Doubles Team Race rankings
#	Team	Points	Tours
1	Wesley Koolhof (NED); Neal Skupski (GBR)	7,850	25
2	Rajeev Ram (USA); Joe Salisbury (GBR)	7,390	18
3	Marcelo Arévalo (ESA); Jean-Julien Rojer (NED)	5,455	25
4	Nikola Mektić (CRO); Mate Pavić (CRO)	5,165	24
5	Lloyd Glasspool (GBR); Harri Heliövaara (FIN)	4,000	27
6	Ivan Dodig (CRO); Austin Krajicek (USA)	3,900	20
7	Marcel Granollers (ESP); Horacio Zeballos (ARG)	3,560	19
8	Thanasi Kokkinakis (AUS); Nick Kyrgios (AUS)	3,350	8
9	Tim Pütz (GER); Michael Venus (NZL)	3,140	18
10	Kevin Krawietz (GER); Andreas Mies (GER)	2,910	25

Competed at 2022 ATP Finals.

Year-end rankings 2022 (26 December 2022)
#	Player	Points	#Trn	'21 Rank	High	Low	'21→'22
1T	Wesley Koolhof (NED)	7,850	24	21	1	21	▲20
1T	Neal Skupski (GBR)	7,850	24	20	1	20	▲19
3	Rajeev Ram (USA)	7,480	19	4	1	4	▲1
4	Joe Salisbury (GBR)	7,390	18	3	1	4	▼1
5	Mate Pavić (CRO)	5,325	25	1	1	12	▼4
6T	Marcelo Arévalo (ESA)	5,230	24	31	5	31	▲25
6T	Jean-Julien Rojer (NED)	5,230	25	38	5	38	▲32
8	Nikola Mektić (CRO)	5,120	24	2	2	13	▼6
9	Ivan Dodig (CRO)	4,210	28	12	8	32	▲3
10	Austin Krajicek (USA)	4,205	30	40	9	46	▲30
11	Harri Heliövaara (FIN)	4,035	30	65	11	64	▲54
12	Lloyd Glasspool (GBR)	3,955	30	80	12	78	▲68
13	Nick Kyrgios (AUS)	3,940	11	231	11	262	▲218
14	Horacio Zeballos (ARG)	3,710	21	6	3	14	▼8
15	Thanasi Kokkinakis (AUS)	3,620	12	429	15	434	▲414
16	Michael Venus (NZL)	3,590	23	15	6	16	▼1
17	Marcel Granollers (ESP)	3,560	19	7	4	17	▼10
18	Tim Pütz (GER)	3,485	19	18	7	18	Steady
19	Rohan Bopanna (IND)	3,420	28	43	17	44	▲24
20	John Isner (USA)	3,320	8	203	14	206	▲183

==== No. 1 ranking ====
Holder	Date gained	Date forfeited
Mate Pavić (CRO)	Year end 2021	3 April 2022
Joe Salisbury (GBR)	4 April 2022	2 October 2022
Rajeev Ram (USA)	3 October 2022	6 November 2022
Wesley Koolhof (NED)	7 November 2022	13 November 2022
Wesley Koolhof (NED); Neal Skupski (GBR)	14 November 2022	Year end 2022

== Point distribution ==
Points are awarded as follows: (Note: Wimbledon was stripped of its ranking points as a result of the All England Club's decision to completely ban Russian and Belarusian athletes from competing.)

Category	W	F	SF	QF	R16	R32	R64	R128	Q	Q3	Q2	Q1
Grand Slam (128S, except Wimbledon)	2000	1200	720	360	180	90	45	10	25	16	8	0
Grand Slam (64D, except Wimbledon)	2000	1200	720	360	180	90	0	–	25	–	0	0
ATP Finals (8S/8D)	1500 (max) 1100 (min)	1000 (max) 600 (min)	600 (max); 200 (min)	200 for each round robin match win, +400 for a semifinal win, +500 for the final win.								
ATP Tour Masters 1000 (96S)	1000	600	360	180	90	45	25	10	16	–	8	0
ATP Tour Masters 1000 (56S)	1000	600	360	180	90	45	10	–	25	–	16	0
ATP Tour Masters 1000 (32D)	1000	600	360	180	90	0	–	–	–	–	–	–
ATP Tour 500 (48S)	500	300	180	90	45	20	0	–	10	–	4	0
ATP Tour 500 (32S/28S)	500	300	180	90	45	0	–	–	20	–	10	0
ATP Tour 500 (16D)	500	300	180	90	0	–	–	–	45	–	25	0
ATP Tour 250 (56S/48S)	250	150	90	45	20	10	0	–	5	–	3	0
ATP Tour 250 (32S/28S)	250	150	90	45	20	0	–	–	12	–	6	0
ATP Tour 250 (16D)	250	150	90	45	0	–	–	–	–	–	–	–
ATP Cup	S 750 (max) D 250 (max)	For details, see 2022 ATP Cup										

== Prize money leaders ==
Prize money in US$ as of 21 November 2022
#	Player	Singles	Doubles	Year-to-date
1	Novak Djokovic (SRB)	$9,934,582	$0	$9,934,582
2	Carlos Alcaraz (ESP)	$7,627,613	$27,517	$7,655,130
3	Rafael Nadal (ESP)	$7,440,806	$1,270	$7,442,076
4	Casper Ruud (NOR)	$6,930,042	$12,274	$6,942,316
5	Stefanos Tsitsipas (GRE)	$5,479,442	$168,974	$5,648,416
6	Taylor Fritz (USA)	$4,489,807	$80,674	$4,570,481
7	Andrey Rublev (RUS)	$4,106,247	$123,707	$4,229,954
8	Félix Auger-Aliassime (CAN)	$4,107,342	$78,700	$4,186,042
9	Daniil Medvedev (RUS)	$4,146,312	$32,212	$4,178,524
10	Nick Kyrgios (AUS)	$2,916,349	$574,115	$3,490,464

== Best matches by ATPTour.com ==
=== Best 5 Grand Slam tournament matches ===
	Event	Round	Surface	Winner	Opponent	Result
1.	US Open	QF	Hard	(Spain) Carlos Alcaraz	(Italy) Jannik Sinner	6–3, 6–7^{(7–9)}, 6–7^{(0–7)}, 7–5, 6–3
2.	Australian Open	F	Hard	(Spain) Rafael Nadal	(Russia) Daniil Medvedev	2–6, 6–7^{(5–7)}, 6–4, 6–4, 7–5
3.	Australian Open	R3	Hard	(Italy) Matteo Berrettini	(Spain) Carlos Alcaraz	6–2, 7–6^{(7–3)}, 4–6, 2–6, 7–6^{(10–5)}
4.	French Open	SF	Clay	(Spain) Rafael Nadal	(Germany) Alexander Zverev	7–6^{(10–8)}, 6–6^{RET}
5.	French Open	QF	Clay	(Croatia) Marin Čilić	Andrey Rublev	5–7, 6–3, 6–4, 3–6, 7–6^{(10–2)}

=== Best 5 ATP Tour matches ===
	Event	Round	Surface	Winner	Opponent	Result
1.	Madrid Open	SF	Clay	(Spain) Carlos Alcaraz	(Serbia) Novak Djokovic	6–7^{(5–7)}, 7–5, 7–6^{(7–5)}
2.	Madrid Open	R3	Clay	(Spain) Rafael Nadal	(Belgium) David Goffin	6–3, 5–7, 7–6^{(11–9)}
3.	Hamburg European Open	F	Clay	(Italy) Lorenzo Musetti	(Spain) Carlos Alcaraz	6–4, 6–7^{(6–8)}, 6–4
4.	Paris Masters	SF	Hard (i)	(Serbia) Novak Djokovic	(Greece) Stefanos Tsitsipas	6–2, 3–6, 7–6^{(7–4)}
5.	Miami Open	QF	Hard	(Spain) Carlos Alcaraz	(Serbia) Miomir Kecmanović	6–7^{(5–7)}, 6–3, 7–6^{(7–5)}

== Retirements ==
The following is a list of notable players (winners of a main tour title, and/or part of the ATP rankings top 100 in singles, or top 100 in doubles, for at least one week) who announced their retirement from professional tennis, became inactive (after not playing for more than 52 weeks), or were permanently banned from playing, during the 2022 season:

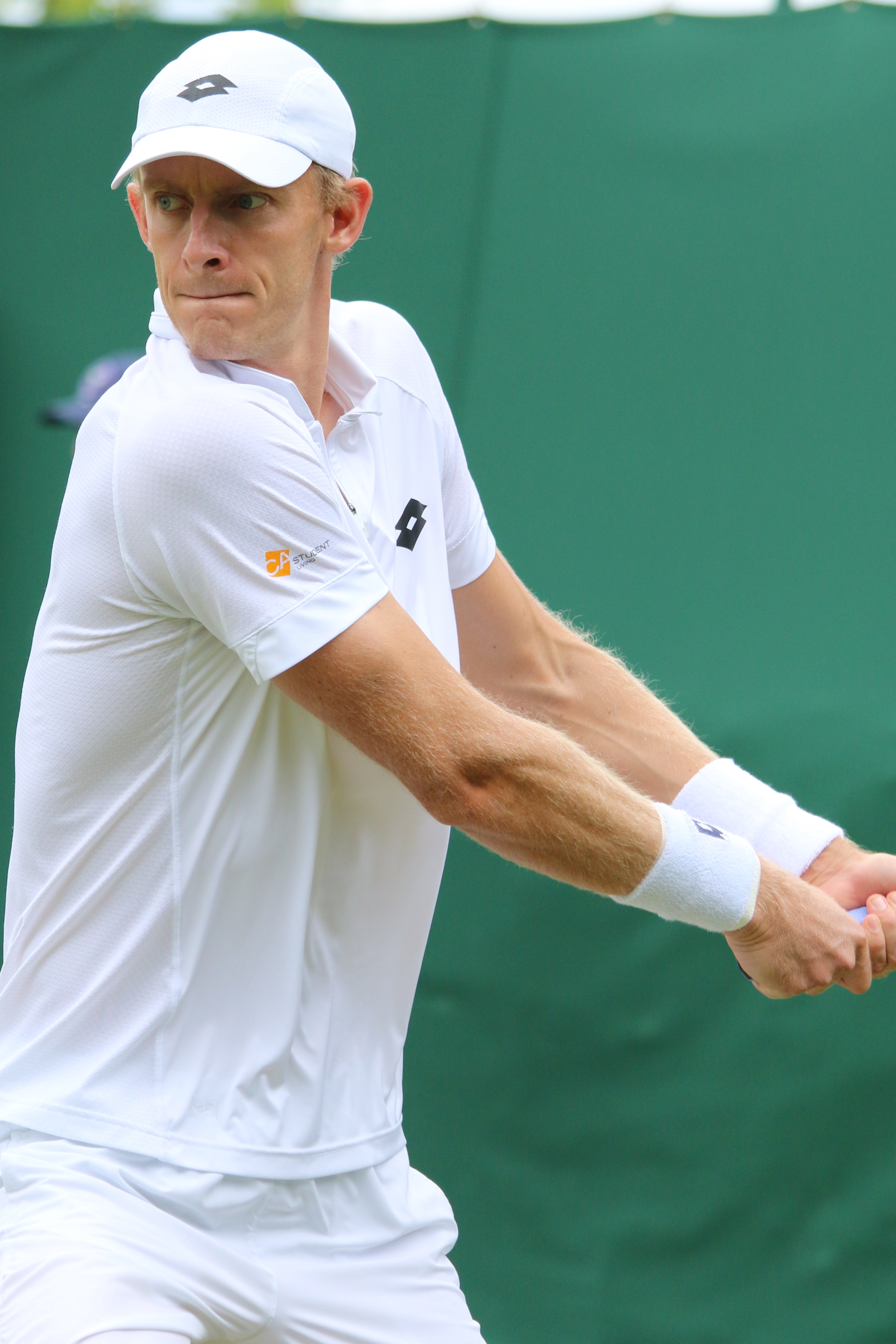
Anderson (pictured in 2017) was a former world No. 5 and two-time Grand Slam finalist

- Kevin Anderson (born 18 May 1986 in Johannesburg, South Africa) joined the professional tour in 2007 and was ranked as high as world No. 5, won seven singles titles on the ATP Tour, and twice was a major finalist, at the 2017 US Open and the 2018 Wimbledon Championships. He played his final professional match in the first round of the Miami Open which he lost.
- Aljaž Bedene (born 18 July 1989 in Ljubljana, SFR Yugoslavia (now Slovenia)) turned professional in 2008 and reached a career-high singles ranking of No. 43 in 2018. In early 2022, he announced he would retire at the end of the season after Slovenia's Davis Cup tie to become a soccer agent.
- Ruben Bemelmans (born 14 January 1988 in Genk, Belgium) joined the professional tour in 2006 and reached a career-high ranking of No. 84 in singles in September 2015 and no. 128 in doubles in October 2012. He won one title in doubles. He played his last singles professional match in the qualifying draw at the Antwerp Open.
- Juan Martín del Potro (born 23 September 1988 in Tandil, Argentina) joined the professional tour in 2005 and reached a career-high ranking of No. 3 in singles on 13 August 2018, and of No. 105 in doubles on 25 May 2009. He won 22 singles titles, including his singular Grand Slam title at the 2009 US Open, two medals at the Olympics, a title at the 2016 Davis Cup, and a Masters 1000 title at the 2018 Indian Wells Masters. After a career plagued by multiple injuries, Del Potro played his last professional match at the 2022 Argentina Open, where he lost to fellow Argentine Federico Delbonis.
- Henri Kontinen (born 19 June 1990 in Helsinki, Finland) joined the professional tour in 2008 and reached a career-high ranking of No. 1 in doubles in April 2017. He won 24 career doubles titles, including one major title in men's doubles and one in mixed doubles. Kontinen announced an indefinite break, having last played in September 2021. In March he was the coach of the Finish Davis Cup team.
- Rogério Dutra Silva (born 3 February 1984 in São Paulo, Brazil) joined the professional tour in 2003 and reached a career-high ranking of No. 63 in singles in July 2017, and No. 84 in doubles, in February 2018. He won one title in doubles. He played his last match at the Rio Open in the doubles tournament.
- (Israel) Jonathan Erlich (born 5 April 1977 in Buenos Aires, Argentina) joined the professional tour in 1996 and career-high rankings of No. 5 in doubles in July 2008. He won 22 career doubles titles, including one major title in men's doubles. Erlich announced his retirement after his participation at the 2022 Tel Aviv Open in September.

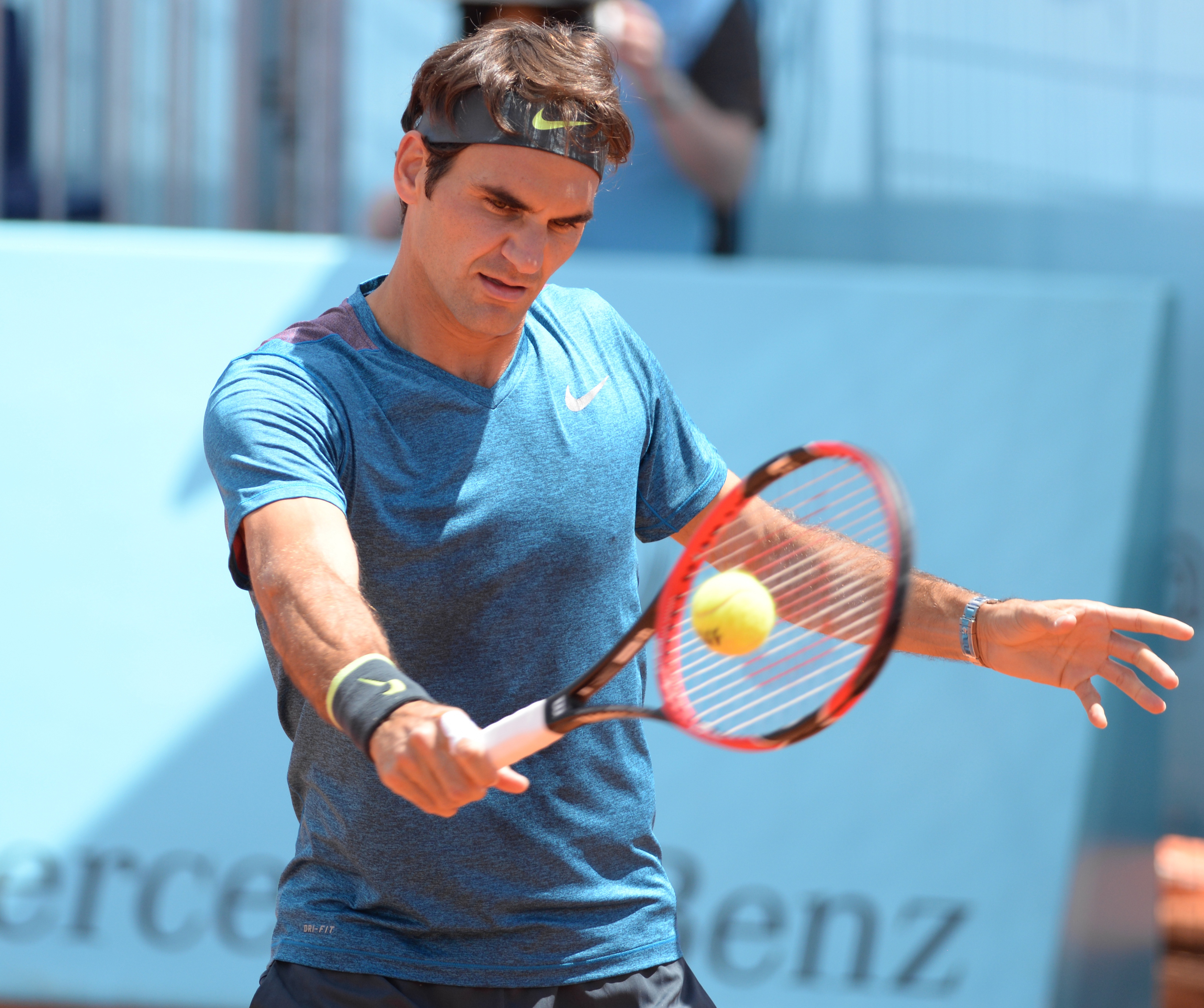
Federer (pictured in 2015) was a former world No. 1 and twenty-time Grand Slam champion. He announced his retirement before the 2022 Laver Cup.

- Roger Federer (born 8 August 1981 in Basel, Switzerland) joined the professional tour in 1998 and reached a career-high ranking of No. 1 in singles in February 2004, and No. 24 in doubles, in June 2003. He won 103 titles in singles, including 20 major titles. He played his last match in doubles at the Laver Cup.
- (Peru) Sergio Galdós joined the professional tour in 2006 and reached career-high rankings of No. 80 in doubles in November 2016. Galdós retired from professional tennis in the season.
- Alejandro González (born 7 February 1989 in Medellín, Colombia), joined the professional tour in 2010 and reached a career-high ranking of No. 70 in singles, in June 2014 and of No. 177 in doubles, in August 2010. In March he played his last match at the Pereira Challenger in the singles tournament, where he lost in the second round.
- Dominic Inglot (born 6 March 1986 in London, United Kingdom) joined the professional tour in 2004 and career-high rankings of No. 18 in doubles in May 2014. He won fourteen doubles titles. Inglot announced his retirement in March 2022.
- Tobias Kamke (born 21 May 1986 in Lübeck, Germany) joined the professional tour in 2004 and reached a career-high ranking of No. 64 in singles in January 2011 and No. 144 in doubles in September 2015. Though he did not win any career tour-level titles, he was named "ATP Newcomer of the Year" in 2010 after contesting four Challenger finals, winning two of them, and reaching the third round at Wimbledon, thus slashing his ranking from No. 254 to No. 67 by year-end. Kamke played his last professional match at the Hamburg Open in the doubles tournament with Dustin Brown, where he lost in the first round.
- Blaž Kavčič (born 5 March 1987 in Ljubljana, SFR Yugoslavia (now Slovenia)) joined the professional tour in 2005 and reached a career-high singles ranking of No. 68 in 2012. In April, he announced he would retire at the end of the season in September after the Davis Cup.
- Philipp Kohlschreiber (born 16 October 1983 in Augsburg, Germany) joined the professional tour in 2002 and reached a career-high ranking of No. 16 in singles, in July 2012. He won eight singles titles and made 68 Grand Slam main draw appearances. He retired from professional tennis after losing the second round match of the Wimbledon qualifying tournament.
- Konstantin Kravchuk (born 23 February 1985 in Moscow, Soviet Union (present-day Russia)) joined the professional tour in 2004 and career-high rankings of No. 78 in singles in November 2016 and No. 100 in doubles in March 2014. Kravchuk retired from professional tennis in the season.
- (Slovakia) Lukáš Lacko (born 3 November 1987 in Piešťany, Czechoslovakia) joined the professional tour in 2005 and career-high rankings of No. 44 in singles in January 2013. Lacko announced in October that this will be his last season.
- Marc López (born 31 July 1982 in Barcelona, Spain) joined the professional tour in 1999 and reached a career-high ranking of No. 106 in singles in May 2004, and of No. 3 in doubles in January 2013. He won 14 titles in doubles, including the 2016 French Open. He won a gold medal for Spain in doubles at the 2016 Olympic Games. His anticipated final appearance came at the Barcelona Open, where he and long-time partner Feliciano López defeated the world No. 1 team of Joe Salisbury and Rajeev Ram. However, he received an additional wildcard for the Madrid Open to partner with Carlos Alcaraz in doubles, where he lost in the second round.
- Yannick Maden (born 28 October 1989 in Stuttgart, Germany) joined the professional tour in 2013 and achieved a career-high ranking of No. 96 in singles in June 2019. He played his last match at the Lille Challenger in March.
- Oliver Marach (born 16 July 1980 in Graz, Austria) joined the professional tour in 1998 and reached a career-high singles ranking of No. 82 in 2006 and doubles ranking of No. 2 in 2018. He won 23 doubles titles, including one Grand Slam title at the 2018 Australian Open. He announced his retirement in December 2022 and played his last professional match at the 2021 Davis Cup Finals.
- David Marrero (born 8 April 1980 in Las Palmas, Spain) joined the professional tour in 2001, winning 14 titles and reaching a career-high doubles ranking of World No. 5 in November 2013. He retired at the Barcelona Open, where he played his last professional match.
- (Romania) Florin Mergea joined the professional tour in 2003 and reached a career-high doubles ranking of No. 7 in July 2015. He won seven doubles titles, including one ATP Masters 1000 title in 2015 Mutua Madrid Open. Mergea announced his retirement from professional tennis in March 2022.
- (United States) Nicholas Monroe (born April 12, 1982, in Oklahoma City, Oklahoma, U.S.) joined the professional tour in 2004 and reached a career-high doubles ranking of No. 30 in 2017. He won four ATP doubles titles, all of which were at ATP 250 tournaments. Monroe announced his retirement in August ahead of the 2022 US Open and explained it would be his final professional tournament.
- (Denmark) Frederik Nielsen (born 27 August 1983) joined the professional tour in 2001 and won the 2012 Wimbledon doubles title. He played his last match at the Davis Cup in September 2022.
- (United States) Sam Querrey (born October 7, 1987 San Francisco, California, U.S.) joined the professional tour in 2006 and reached a career-high singles ranking of No. 11 in 2018 and doubles ranking of No. 23 in 2010. He won ten singles titles, including two ATP 500 titles in Memphis and Acapulco, and five doubles titles, including one ATP Masters 1000 title in Rome. He announced his retirement on 30 August and played his last matches in singles and doubles at the US Open.
- Stéphane Robert (born 17 May 1980 in Montargis, France) joined the professional tour in 2001 and reached a career-high ranking of No. 50 in singles in October 2016 and No. 99 in doubles in April 2014. Robert retired from professional tennis in the season.

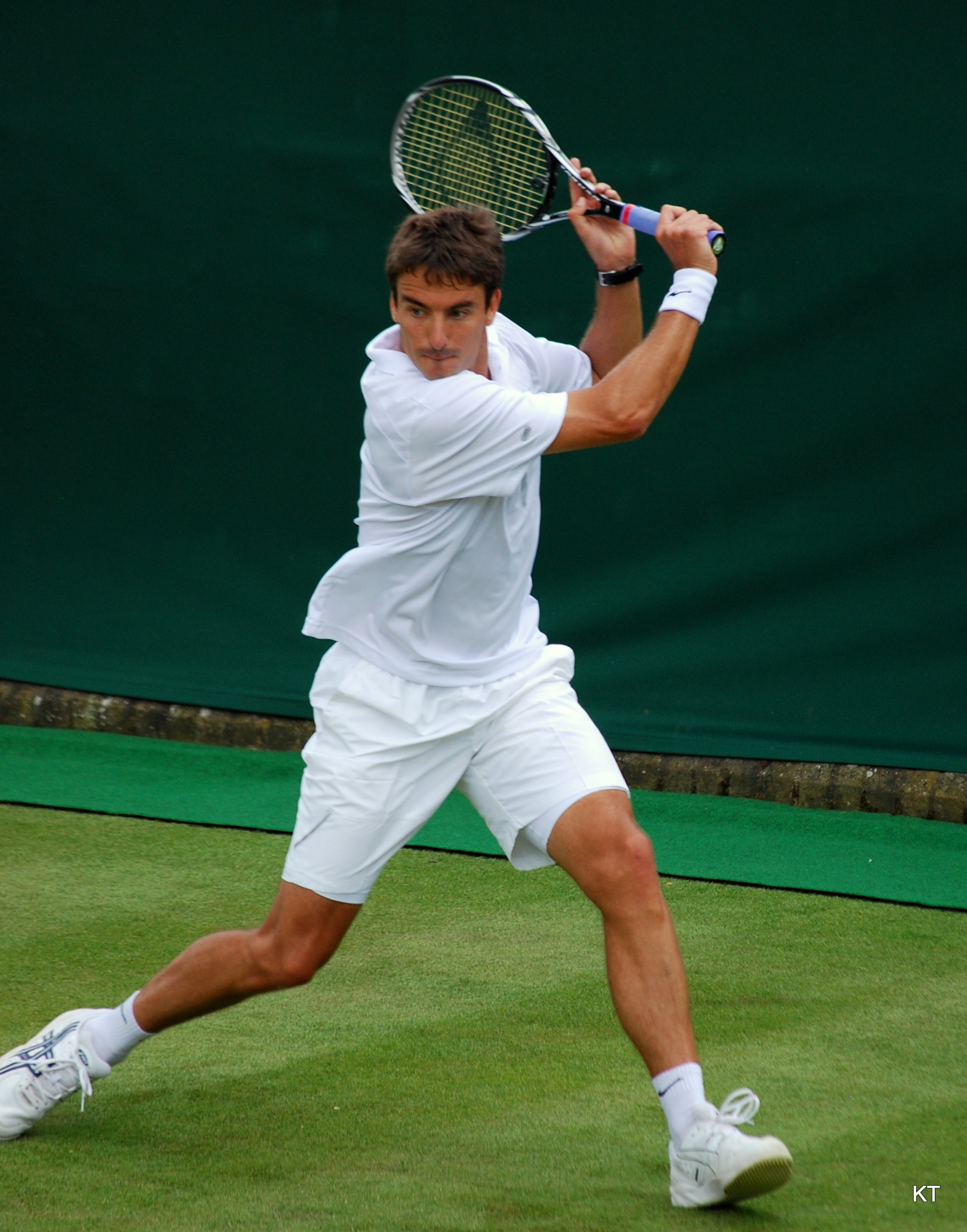
Robredo (pictured in 2011) reached a career-high ranking of No. 5 in singles in 2006 and won 12 singles titles

- Tommy Robredo (born 1 May 1982 in Hostalric, Spain) joined the professional tour in 1998 and reached a career-high ranking of No. 5 in singles, in August 2006 and of No. 16 in doubles, in April 2009. In singles, he won twelve titles, including the 2006 Hamburg Masters. He also won the Davis Cup three times (in 2004, 2008 and 2009). In doubles, he won five titles, including the 2018 Monte-Carlo Masters, and reached the semifinals of the US Open three times (in 2004, 2008 and 2010). His final tournament was at the Barcelona Open, where he made his ATP Tour debut 23 years prior.
- Dudi Sela (born 4 April 1985 in Kiryat Shmona, Israel) joined the professional tour in 2002 and career-high rankings of No. 29 in doubles in July 2009. He won one doubles title. Sela announced his plans in January to retire after the 2022 season.
- Andreas Seppi (born 21 February 1984 in Bolzano, Italy) joined the professional tour in 2002 and reached a career-high ranking of No. 18 in singles, in January 2013. He has been Italy's No. 1 for 215 weeks. He won 3 singles titles, being the first Italian winning a tournament on grass. He has a record of 66 consecutive appearances in the Grand Slam tournaments (the third highest number ever reached by any male tennis player). He has announced he will retire after the Challenger in Ortisei, his hometown.
- Gilles Simon (born 27 December 1984 in Nice, France) joined the professional tour in 2002 and reached a career-high ranking of No. 6 in singles, in January 2009. He won 14 singles titles, and reached the finals of the Madrid Masters in 2008 (lost to Andy Murray) and the Shanghai Masters in 2014 (lost to Roger Federer). He announced his retirement at the end of the season.
- Ken Skupski (born 9 April 1983 in Liverpool, England, United Kingdom) joined the professional tour in 2001 and career-high rankings and No. 44 in doubles in July 2010. He won seven doubles titles. Skupski announced his retirement after Wimbledon where he played his last match on 4 July 2022.
- Bruno Soares (born 27 February 1982 in Belo Horizonte, Brazil) joined the professional tour in 2001 and reached a career-high ranking of No. 2 in doubles in October 2016. He won 35 career doubles titles, including three major titles in men's doubles and three in mixed doubles. Soares played his last match at the 2022 US Open with Jamie Murray.
- Go Soeda (born 5 September 1984 in Kanagawa, Japan) joined the professional tour in 2003 and reached a career-high ranking of No. 47 in singles in July 2012. Soeda retired from professional tennis in the season.
- (Ukraine) Sergiy Stakhovsky (born 6 January 1986 in Kyiv, Ukrainian SSR, Soviet Union) joined the professional tour in 2003 and reached a career-high ranking of No. 31 in singles, in September 2010 and of No. 33 in doubles, in June 2011. He won four titles in singles and four titles in doubles. He played his last match at the Australian Open.
- Horia Tecău (born 19 January 1985 in Constanța, Romania), former World No. 2 in doubles, won 38 doubles titles. The 36-year-old Romanian won 20 trophies with Jean-Julien Rojer and the pair finished 2015 as the year-end No. 1 team and Nitto ATP Finals champions. Together, they won the 2015 Wimbledon and 2017 US Open crowns. Tecău played his last match at the 2021 ATP Finals before his retirement on 18 November 2021. He made a brief comeback at the 2022 Davis Cup qualifying round with Marius Copil, where they won their match against Spain.

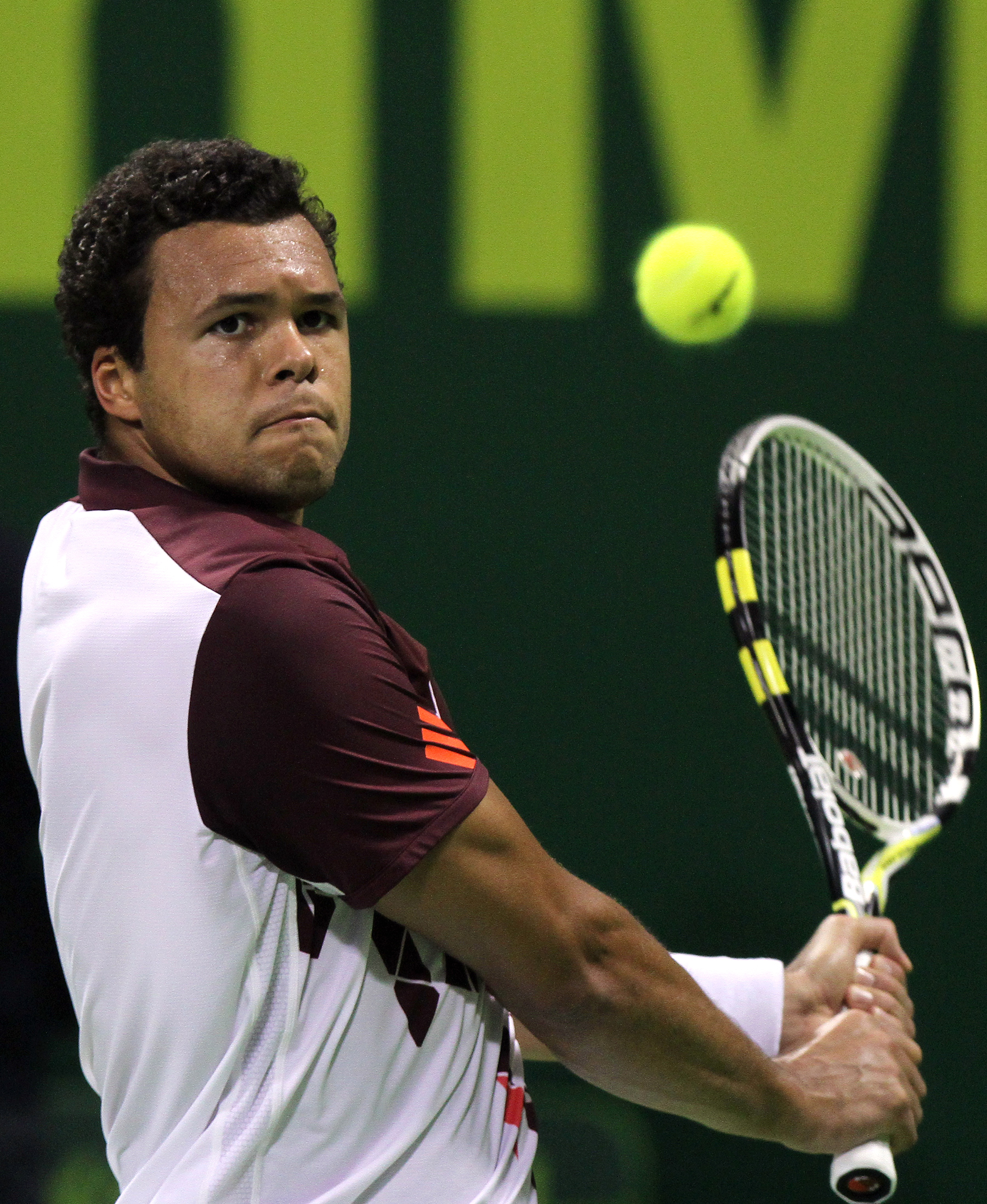
Tsonga (pictured in 2012) was a former world No. 5, one-time Grand Slam finalist, and two-time Masters 1000 champion

- Jo-Wilfried Tsonga (born 17 April 1985 in Le Mans, France) joined the professional tour in 2004 and reached a career-high ranking of No. 5 in singles, in February 2012, and of No. 33 in doubles, in October 2009. In singles, he won eighteen titles, including the 2008 Paris Masters and the 2014 Canadian Open, while also reaching the final of the 2008 Australian Open (lost to Novak Djokovic) and the 2011 ATP Finals (lost to Roger Federer). He also helped France to win the Davis Cup in 2017. In doubles, Tsonga won four titles, including the 2009 Shanghai Masters (partnered with Julien Benneteau). He retired after his final tournament at the French Open, where he lost in the first round.

=== Inactivity ===
- (United Kingdom) Luke Bambridge became inactive, having not played a match since 2021.
- (New Zealand) Marcus Daniell became inactive after suffering a knee injury which made him skip the majority of the 2022 season.
- (Spain) Gerard Granollers became inactive, having not played a match since 2021.
- (Croatia) Ivo Karlovic became inactive, having not played a match since 2021.
- (Japan) Kei Nishikori became inactive, having not played a match since 2021.
- (Canada) Milos Raonic became inactive, having not played a match since 2021.

== Comebacks ==
The following is a list of notable players (winners of a main tour title, and/or part of the ATP rankings top 100 in singles, or top 100 in doubles, for at least one week) who returned from retirement during the 2022 season:

- (South Korea) Hyeon Chung
- (United Kingdom) Kyle Edmund
- (Thailand) Sanchai Ratiwatana returned for one tournament at the M15 Jakarta, Indonesia, partnering Thanapet Chanta in the doubles event.
- (Belgium) Xavier Malisse

== See also ==
- 2022 ATP Challenger Tour
- 2022 ITF Men's World Tennis Tour
- 2022 WTA Tour
- International Tennis Federation
- Current tennis rankings
