= 2022 Abierto Mexicano Telcel – Doubles =

Doubles
- 2022 Abierto Mexicano Telcel

Final
- Champions: (Spain) Feliciano López (Greece) Stefanos Tsitsipas
- Runners-up: (El Salvador) Marcelo Arévalo (Netherlands) Jean-Julien Rojer
- Score: 7–5, 6–4

Events
Singles	Doubles
- Abierto Mexicano Telcel

Feliciano López and Stefanos Tsitsipas defeated Marcelo Arévalo and Jean-Julien Rojer in the final, 7–5, 6–4 to win the doubles title at the 2022 Mexican Open.

Ken and Neal Skupski were the defending champions, but chose to play in Dubai instead.

== Seeds ==
1. (Spain) Marcel Granollers / (Argentina) Horacio Zeballos (quarterfinals)
2. (Colombia) Juan Sebastián Cabal / (Colombia) Robert Farah (quarterfinals)
3. (United Kingdom) Jamie Murray / (Brazil) Bruno Soares (quarterfinals)
4. (El Salvador) Marcelo Arévalo / (Netherlands) Jean-Julien Rojer (final)

== Draw ==
Key

- Q = Qualifier
- WC = Wild card
- LL = Lucky loser
- Alt = Alternate
- ITF = ITF entry
- PR = Protected ranking
- SR = Special ranking
- SE = Special exempt
- JE = Junior exempt
- JR = Junior Accelerator Programme entrant
- CO = College Accelerator Programme entrant
- NG = Next Gen Accelerator Program entrant
- w/o = Walkover
- r = Retired
- d = Defaulted

=== Draw ===
First round
1	(Spain) M Granollers (Argentina) H Zeballos	6	6
(Uruguay) A Behar (Ecuador) G Escobar	3	4
Alt	(Germany) P Gojowczyk (Germany) O Otte	3	6	[14]
WC	(Mexico) H Hach Verdugo (United States) J Isner	6	2	[16]
4	(El Salvador) M Arévalo (Netherlands) J-J Rojer	5	6	[10]
(Serbia) D Lajović (Monaco) H Nys	7	2	[8]
(Mexico) S González (Argentina) A Molteni	6	6
Alt	(United Kingdom) E Barr (Mexico) M Sánchez	1	0
(Brazil) M Melo (Germany) A Zverev	2	6	[6]
LL	(United Kingdom) L Glasspool (Finland) H Heliövaara	6	4	[10]
(Bosnia and Herzegovina) T Brkić (Serbia) N Ćaćić	6	4	[4]
3	(United Kingdom) J Murray (Brazil) B Soares	2	6	[10]
WC	(Spain) F López (Greece) S Tsitsipas	7^{9}	6
Q	(Australia) L Saville (Australia) J-P Smith	6^{7}	4
LL	(Mexico) MÁ Reyes-Varela (United States) M Schnur	7	2	[4]
2	(Colombia) JS Cabal (Colombia) R Farah	5	6	[10]

Quarterfinals
1	(Spain) M Granollers (Argentina) H Zeballos	7	3	[5]
WC	(Mexico) H Hach Verdugo (United States) J Isner	5	6	[10]
4	(El Salvador) M Arévalo (Netherlands) J-J Rojer	7^{7}	6
(Mexico) S González (Argentina) A Molteni	6^{4}	2
LL	(United Kingdom) L Glasspool (Finland) H Heliövaara	4	6	[10]
3	(United Kingdom) J Murray (Brazil) B Soares	6	3	[6]
WC	(Spain) F López (Greece) S Tsitsipas	4	6	[12]
2	(Colombia) JS Cabal (Colombia) R Farah	6	4	[10]

Semifinals
WC	(Mexico) H Hach Verdugo (United States) J Isner	5	5
4	(El Salvador) M Arévalo (Netherlands) J-J Rojer	7	7
LL	(United Kingdom) L Glasspool (Finland) H Heliövaara	4	4
WC	(Spain) F López (Greece) S Tsitsipas	6	6

Final
4	(El Salvador) M Arévalo (Netherlands) J-J Rojer	5	4
WC	(Spain) F López (Greece) S Tsitsipas	7	6

== Qualifying ==
=== Seeds ===
1. (Australia) Luke Saville / (Australia) John-Patrick Smith (qualified)
2. (United Kingdom) Lloyd Glasspool / (Finland) Harri Heliövaara (qualifying competition, lucky losers)

=== Qualifiers ===
1. (Australia) Luke Saville / (Australia) John-Patrick Smith

=== Lucky losers ===
1. (United Kingdom) Lloyd Glasspool / (Finland) Harri Heliövaara
2. (Mexico) Miguel Ángel Reyes-Varela / (United States) Max Schnur

=== Qualifying draw ===
First round
1	(Australia) Luke Saville (Australia) John-Patrick Smith	6	6
WC	(Spain) David Marrero (Spain) Fernando Verdasco	2	3
Alt	(Mexico) Miguel Ángel Reyes-Varela (United States) Max Schnur	3	4
2	(United Kingdom) Lloyd Glasspool (Finland) Harri Heliövaara	6	6

Qualifying competition
1	(Australia) Luke Saville (Australia) John-Patrick Smith	6	4	[10]
2	(United Kingdom) Lloyd Glasspool (Finland) Harri Heliövaara	4	6	[4]
