= 2022 Abierto Mexicano Telcel – Singles =

Singles
- 2022 Abierto Mexicano Telcel

Final
- Champion: (Spain) Rafael Nadal
- Runner-up: (United Kingdom) Cameron Norrie
- Score: 6–4, 6–4

Details
- Draw: 32 (4 Q / 3 WC )
- Seeds: 8

Events
Singles	Doubles
← 2021 ·	Mexican Open	· 2023 →

Rafael Nadal defeated Cameron Norrie in the final, 6–4, 6–4 to win the singles title at the 2022 Mexican Open. Nadal did not drop a set during a tournament for a record-extending 30th time. It was his fourth Acapulco title and 91st career singles title overall.

Alexander Zverev was the defending champion, but he was defaulted from the tournament prior to his second-round singles match after he showed unsportsmanlike conduct at the conclusion of his first-round doubles match, repeatedly hitting the umpire’s chair with his racquet and using obscene language.

Zverev and Daniil Medvedev were in contention to claim the world No. 1 singles ranking. After Novak Djokovic lost in the quarterfinals in Dubai, Medvedev clinched the top ranking for the first time, making him the 27th player, and first player born in the 1990s, to hold the position. Medvedev also became the first player outside of the Big Four to hold the world number 1 ranking since Andy Roddick in February 2004, ending the quartet's 943-week streak with the top position.

For the first time since the 2013 China Open, four of the top five ranked players competed at the same ATP 500 tournament.

The first-round match between Zverev and Jenson Brooksby had the latest-ever finish in an ATP Tour match when it ended at 4:55 a.m. local time, passing the previous record of 4:34 a.m. local time set by Lleyton Hewitt and Marcos Baghdatis at the 2008 Australian Open. At three hours and twenty-two minutes, it was also the longest match ever played at the Mexican Open.

== Seeds ==
1. (Russia) Daniil Medvedev (semifinals)
2. (Germany) Alexander Zverev (second round, defaulted for unsportsmanlike conduct in doubles)
3. (Greece) Stefanos Tsitsipas (semifinals)
4. (Spain) Rafael Nadal (champion)
5. (Italy) Matteo Berrettini (first round, retired)
6. (United Kingdom) Cameron Norrie (final)
7. (United States) Taylor Fritz (second round)
8. (Spain) Pablo Carreño Busta (second round)

== Draw ==
=== Key ===
- Q = Qualifier
- WC = Wild card
- LL = Lucky loser
- Alt = Alternate
- SE = Special exempt
- PR = Protected ranking
- ITF = ITF entry
- JE = Junior exempt
- w/o = Walkover
- r = Retired
- d = Defaulted
- SR = Special ranking

=== Finals ===
Semifinals
1	(Russia) Daniil Medvedev	3	3
4	(Spain) Rafael Nadal	6	6
3	(Greece) Stefanos Tsitsipas	4	4
6	(United Kingdom) Cameron Norrie	6	6

Final
4	(Spain) Rafael Nadal	6	6
6	(United Kingdom) Cameron Norrie	4	4

=== Top half ===
First round
1	(Russia) D Medvedev	6	6
(France) B Paire	3	4
WC	(Mexico) A Hernández	0	1
PR	(Spain) P Andújar	6	6
WC	(Spain) F López	6	0	4
Q	(Japan) Y Nishioka	2	6	6
(France) A Mannarino	3	3
7	(United States) T Fritz	6	6
4	(Spain) R Nadal	6	6
LL	(United States) D Kudla	3	2
(Bulgaria) G Dimitrov	6^{8}	7	3
LL	(United States) S Kozlov	7^{10}	5	6
(Serbia) D Lajović	6	4	7
(United States) S Korda	4	6	5
(United States) T Paul	4	5
5	(Italy) M Berrettini	6	1^{r}

Second round
1	(Russia) D Medvedev	6	6
PR	(Spain) P Andújar	1	2
Q	(Japan) Y Nishioka	3	6	6
7	(United States) T Fritz	6	4	2
4	(Spain) R Nadal	6	6
LL	(United States) S Kozlov	0	3
(Serbia) D Lajović	6^{6}	6	5
(United States) T Paul	7^{8}	2	7

Quarterfinals
1	(Russia) D Medvedev	6	6
Q	(Japan) Y Nishioka	2	3
4	(Spain) R Nadal	6	7^{7}
(United States) T Paul	0	6^{5}

Semifinals
1	(Russia) D Medvedev	3	3
4	(Spain) R Nadal	6	6

=== Bottom half ===
First round
8	(Spain) P Carreño Busta	6	6
Q	(Germany) O Otte	2	4
SE	(Australia) J Millman	6^{3}	0^{r}
(United States) M Giron	7^{7}	2
Q	(United States) JJ Wolf	3	7^{9}	6
(Italy) L Sonego	6	6^{7}	2
(Serbia) L Đere	6^{7}	6^{4}
3	(Greece) S Tsitsipas	7^{9}	7^{7}
6	(United Kingdom) C Norrie	7^{7}	6
Q	(Germany) D Altmaier	6^{5}	2
WC	(Spain) F Verdasco	5	7^{7}	6^{3}
(United States) J Isner	7	6^{4}	7^{7}
(United States) B Nakashima	4	4
LL	(Germany) P Gojowczyk	6	6
(United States) J Brooksby	6	6^{10}	2
2	(Germany) A Zverev	3	7^{12}	6

Second round
8	(Spain) P Carreño Busta	7^{9}	4	6^{4}
(United States) M Giron	6^{7}	6	7^{7}
Q	(United States) JJ Wolf	1	0
3	(Greece) S Tsitsipas	6	6
6	(United Kingdom) C Norrie	6^{2}	6	6
(United States) J Isner	7^{7}	3	4
LL	(Germany) P Gojowczyk	0
2	(Germany) A Zverev	0^{d}

Quarterfinals
(United States) M Giron	3	4
3	(Greece) S Tsitsipas	6	6
6	(United Kingdom) C Norrie	6	6
LL	(Germany) P Gojowczyk	1	0

Semifinals
3	(Greece) S Tsitsipas	4	4
6	(United Kingdom) C Norrie	6	6

== Qualifying ==
=== Seeds ===
1. (Germany) Daniel Altmaier (qualified)
2. (Germany) Oscar Otte (qualified)
3. (South Africa) Kevin Anderson (qualifying competition)
4. (Germany) Peter Gojowczyk (qualifying competition, lucky loser)
5. (United States) Steve Johnson (first round)
6. (United States) Denis Kudla (qualifying competition, lucky loser)
7. (Japan) Yoshihito Nishioka (qualified)
8. (Italy) Andreas Seppi (first round)

=== Qualifiers ===
1. (Germany) Daniel Altmaier
2. (Germany) Oscar Otte
3. (United States) J. J. Wolf
4. (Japan) Yoshihito Nishioka

=== Lucky losers ===
1. (Germany) Peter Gojowczyk
2. (United States) Denis Kudla
3. (United States) Stefan Kozlov

=== Qualifying draw ===
==== First qualifier ====
First round
1	(Germany) Daniel Altmaier	6	3	6
(United States) Ernesto Escobedo	2	6	1
WC	(Mexico) Rodrigo Pacheco Méndez	6	4	1
6	(United States) Denis Kudla	4	6	6

Qualifying competition
1	(Germany) Daniel Altmaier	4	6	6
6	(United States) Denis Kudla	6	4	2

==== Second qualifier ====
First round
2	(Germany) Oscar Otte	6	6
(Ecuador) Emilio Gómez	3	1
Alt	(United States) Stefan Kozlov	6	6
5	(United States) Steve Johnson	4	3

Qualifying competition
2	(Germany) Oscar Otte	6	0	7^{7}
Alt	(United States) Stefan Kozlov	1	6	6^{2}

==== Third qualifier ====
First round
3	(South Africa) Kevin Anderson	6	7^{8}
WC	(Colombia) Nicolás Mejía	3	6^{6}
PR	(United States) J. J. Wolf	6	6
8	(Italy) Andreas Seppi	4	2

Qualifying competition
3	(South Africa) Kevin Anderson	7^{7}	4	3
PR	(United States) J. J. Wolf	6^{3}	6	6

==== Fourth qualifier ====
First round
4	(Germany) Peter Gojowczyk	6	6
WC	(Mexico) Gerardo López Villaseñor	1	1
PR	(Germany) Cedrik-Marcel Stebe	6	3	4
7	(Japan) Yoshihito Nishioka	1	6	6

Qualifying competition
4	(Germany) Peter Gojowczyk	3	2
7	(Japan) Yoshihito Nishioka	6	6
