= 2024 Abierto Mexicano Telcel =

- Date: 26 February – 2 March
- Edition: 31st
- Draw: 32S / 16D
- Prize money: $2,206,080
- Surface: Hard, outdoor
- Location: Acapulco, Mexico
- Venue: Arena GNP Seguros

Champions

Singles
- (Australia) Alex de Minaur

Doubles
- (Monaco) Hugo Nys / (Poland) Jan Zieliński
- Mexican Open

The 2024 Mexican Open (also known as the Abierto Mexicano Telcel presentado por HSBC for sponsorship reasons) is a professional tennis tournament played on outdoor hard courts. It is the 31st edition of the men's Mexican Open, and an ATP 500 tournament on the 2024 ATP Tour. The tournament is taking place in Acapulco, Mexico between 26 February and 2 March 2024, at the Arena GNP Seguros.

== Champions ==
=== Singles ===
- (Australia) Alex de Minaur def. (Norway) Casper Ruud, 6–4, 6–4

=== Doubles ===
- (Monaco) Hugo Nys / (Poland) Jan Zieliński def. (Mexico) Santiago González / (United Kingdom) Neal Skupski, 6–3, 6–2

== Singles main-draw entrants ==
=== Seeds ===
Country	Player	Ranking^{1}	Seed
GER	Alexander Zverev	6	1
DEN	Holger Rune	7	2
AUS	Alex de Minaur	9	3
USA	Taylor Fritz	10	4
GRE	Stefanos Tsitsipas	11	5
NOR	Casper Ruud	12	6
USA	Tommy Paul	14	7
USA	Frances Tiafoe	15	8

- ^{1} Rankings as of 19 February 2024.

=== Other entrants ===
The following players received wildcards into the main draw:

- (Mexico) Ernesto Escobedo
- (Mexico) Rodrigo Pacheco Méndez
- (Argentina) Diego Schwartzman

The following players received entry from the qualifying draw:

- (France) Térence Atmane
- (Italy) Flavio Cobolli
- (United States) Aleksandar Kovacevic
- (United States) Michael Mmoh

The following player received entry as a lucky loser:

- (Japan) Yoshihito Nishioka

=== Withdrawals ===
- (Bulgaria) Grigor Dimitrov → replaced by (Germany) Daniel Altmaier
- (Serbia) Laslo Djere → replaced by (Serbia) Dušan Lajović
- (United States) Mackenzie McDonald → replaced by (United Kingdom) Jack Draper
- (United Kingdom) Cameron Norrie → replaced by (Japan) Yoshihito Nishioka

== Doubles main-draw entrants ==
=== Seeds ===
Country	Player	Country	Player	Rank^{1}	Seed
MEX	Santiago González	GBR	Neal Skupski	17	1
MON	Hugo Nys	POL	Jan Zieliński	49	2
~~AUS~~	~~Rinky Hijikata~~	~~GBR~~	~~Joe Salisbury~~	~~60~~	~~3~~
FRA	Sadio Doumbia	FRA	Fabien Reboul	69	4

- ^{1} Rankings as of 19 February 2024.

=== Other entrants ===
The following pairs received wildcards into the doubles main draw:

- (Argentina) Guido Andreozzi / (Mexico) Miguel Ángel Reyes-Varela
- (Greece) Petros Tsitsipas / (Greece) Stefanos Tsitsipas

The following pair received entry from the qualifying draw:

- (United Kingdom) Dan Evans / (United Kingdom) Henry Patten

The following pairs received entry as lucky losers:

- (Mexico) Emiliano Aguilera / (Mexico) Manuel Sánchez
- (Mexico) Hans Hach Verdugo / (Venezuela) Luis David Martínez

=== Withdrawals ===
- (Serbia) Laslo Djere / (Austria) Sebastian Ofner → replaced by (United States) William Blumberg / (Norway) Casper Ruud
- (Australia) Rinky Hijikata / (United Kingdom) Joe Salisbury → replaced by (Mexico) Hans Hach Verdugo / (Venezuela) Luis David Martínez
- (Germany) Kevin Krawietz / (Germany) Tim Pütz → replaced by (Monaco) Romain Arneodo / (Austria) Sam Weissborn
- (United States) Mackenzie McDonald / (United States) Ben Shelton → replaced by (Ecuador) Gonzalo Escobar / (Kazakhstan) Aleksandr Nedovyesov
- (Australia) Max Purcell / (Australia) Jordan Thompson → replaced by (Mexico) Emiliano Aguilera / (Mexico) Manuel Sánchez
