= Arena GNP Seguros =

Tennis venue in Acapulco, Mexico

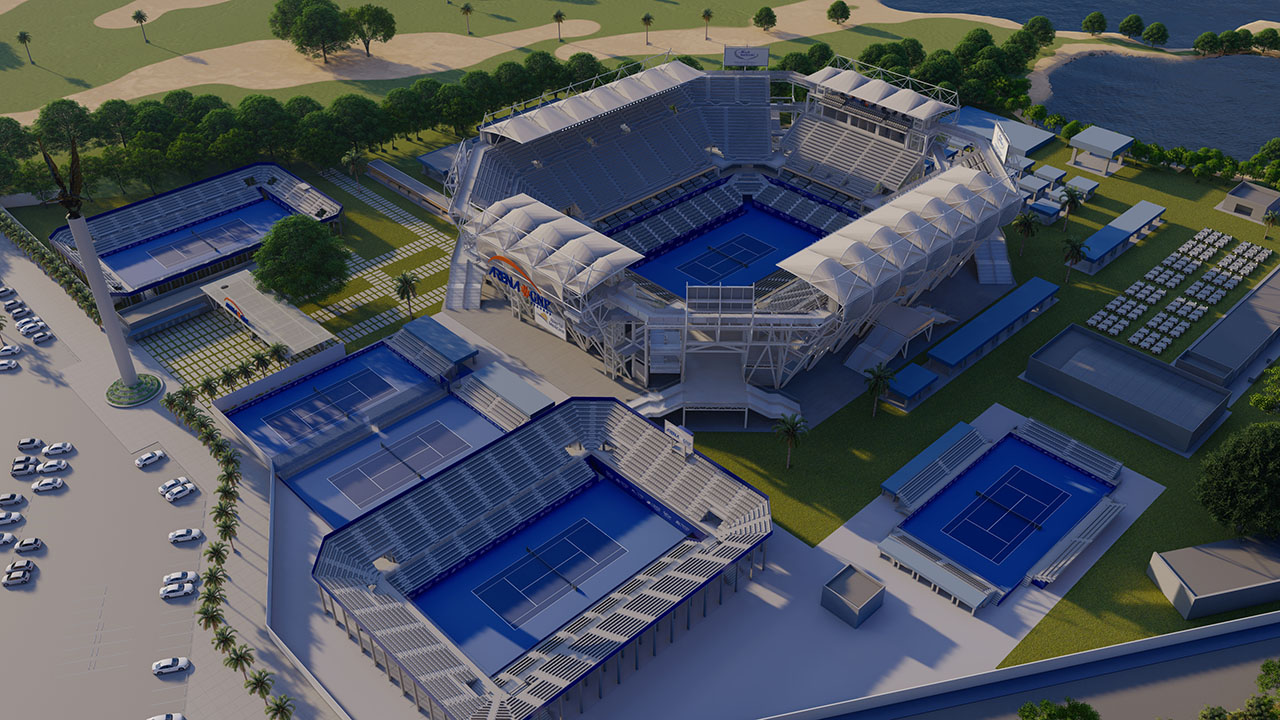
- Digital rendering of the complex
- Interactive map of Arena GNP Seguros
- Location: Blvd. de las Naciones s/n Granjas del Marqués, 39890; Acapulco de Juárez, Gro., Mexico
- Coordinates: 16.7991°N 99.8229°W
- Owner: Mundo Imperial
- Capacity: 12,143; 10,501 (tennis)

Construction
- Opened: 21 February 2022
- Cost: $800 million MXN
- Architect: Pepe Moyao

Tenant
- Mexican Open (ATP 500 Series) (2022–present)

Website
- arenagnpseguros.com

Arena GNP Seguros is a complex of tennis courts and stadiums in Acapulco, Mexico. Opened in February 2022, it was designed to host the Mexican Open, an ATP 500 tournament. It is the largest ATP Tour venue in Latin America.

== History ==
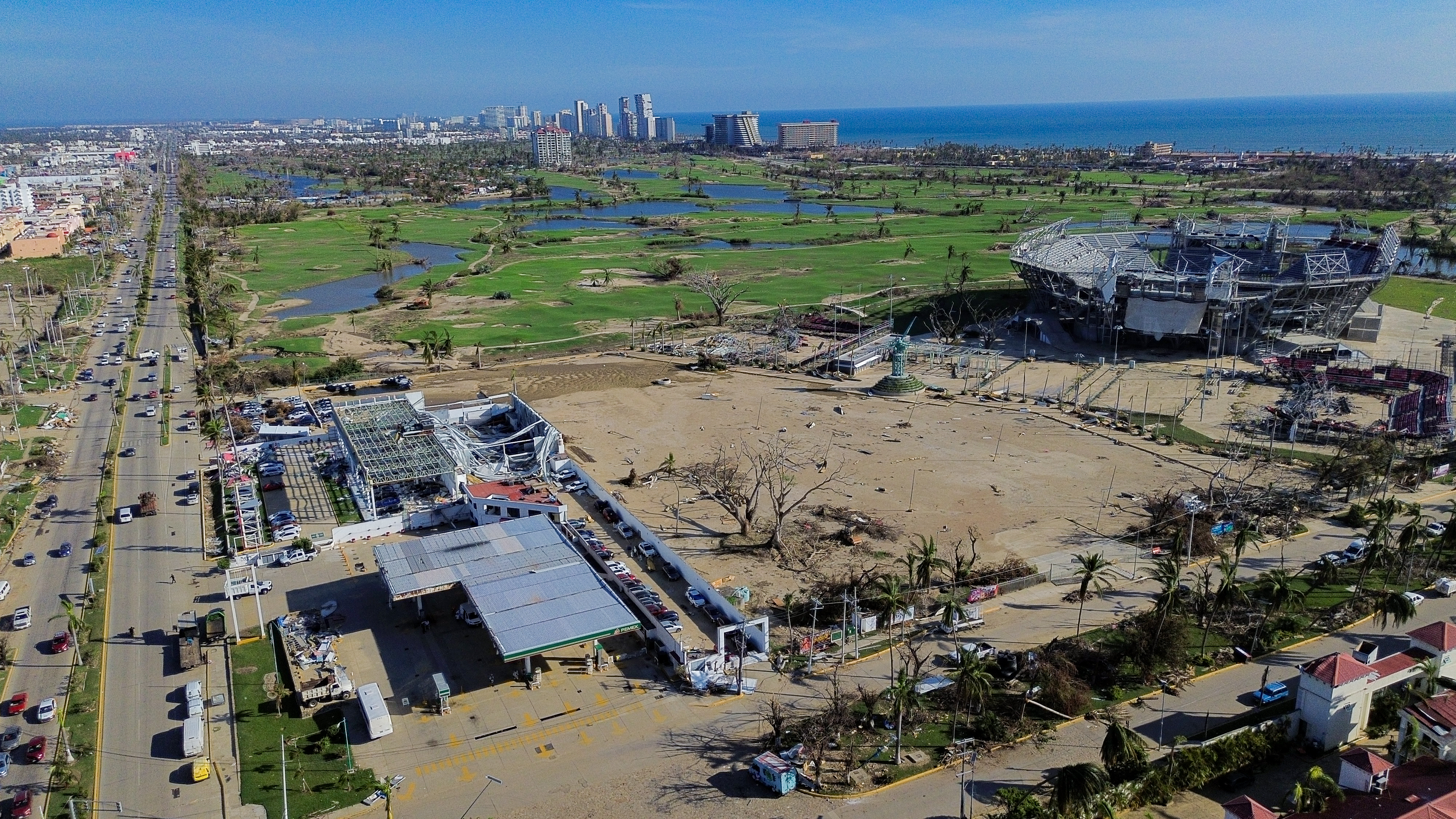
The arena was heavily damaged by Hurricane Otis in October 2023.

Arena GNP Seguros was constructed for $800 million MXN. Pepe Moyao served as the architect. It was inaugurated on 21 February 2022 by Evelyn Salgado Pineda, the governor of Guerrero, and Abelina López Rodríguez, the municipal president of Acapulco. That same day, the arena began hosting its inaugural event, the 2022 Mexican Open. Later that year, the project won the Work of the Year Award at the Premios Elle Decoration México.

The arena was heavily damaged and flooded during Hurricane Otis in October 2023. Despite this, the Mexican Open was still held at the arena in February 2024. That September, the arena also suffered damage from Hurricane John. Repairs to the arena from both hurricanes cost between $305 and $320 million MXN.

== Notable events ==
=== Tennis ===
Since 2022, the arena has hosted the Mexican Open on the ATP Tour. The tournament had previously been held at the Fairmont Acapulco Princess. In April 2024, the arena hosted the GNP Seguros Tennis Open on the ATP Challenger Tour.

=== Other sports ===
On 28 December 2022, the arena hosted the Noche de Campeones, a AAA pay-per-view professional wrestling event.

In April 2023, the arena began hosting the Acapulco Beach Soccer Cup. In January 2025, Beach Soccer Worldwide announced that the arena would continue hosting the tournament through 2027.

In March 2024, the arena hosted the Premier Padel GNP Mexico tournament as part of the 2024 FIP Tour.

=== Concerts ===
In November 2022, the arena hosted the OlaFest music festival. Performers included La Arrolladora, Alejandra Guzmán, Piso 21, and Nicky Jam. In May 2023, OV7 performed at the arena as part of their 30 Años Tour. Luis Miguel was scheduled to perform at the arena in December 2023 as part of his 2023–24 tour, however, due to the effects of Hurricane Otis, the shows were rescheduled to November 2024.

In May 2025, Los Tigres del Norte will perform at the arena as part of their La Lotería Tour. In July 2025, Grupo Firme will perform at the arena as part of their La Última Peda Tour.

=== Other events ===
In May 2022, the arena hosted the Tianguis Turístico convention.

== Gallery ==
Arena GNP Seguros
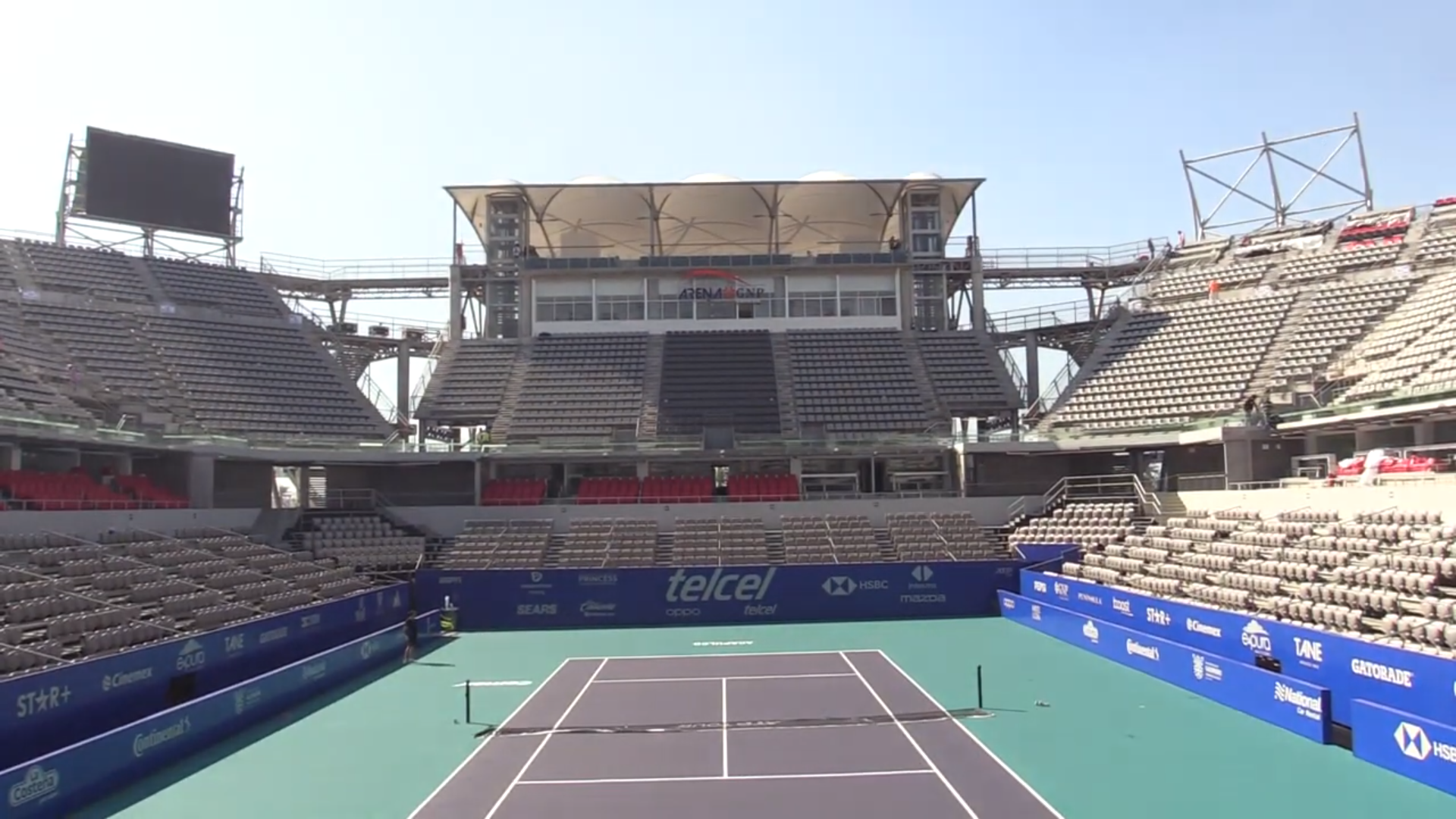
Center court

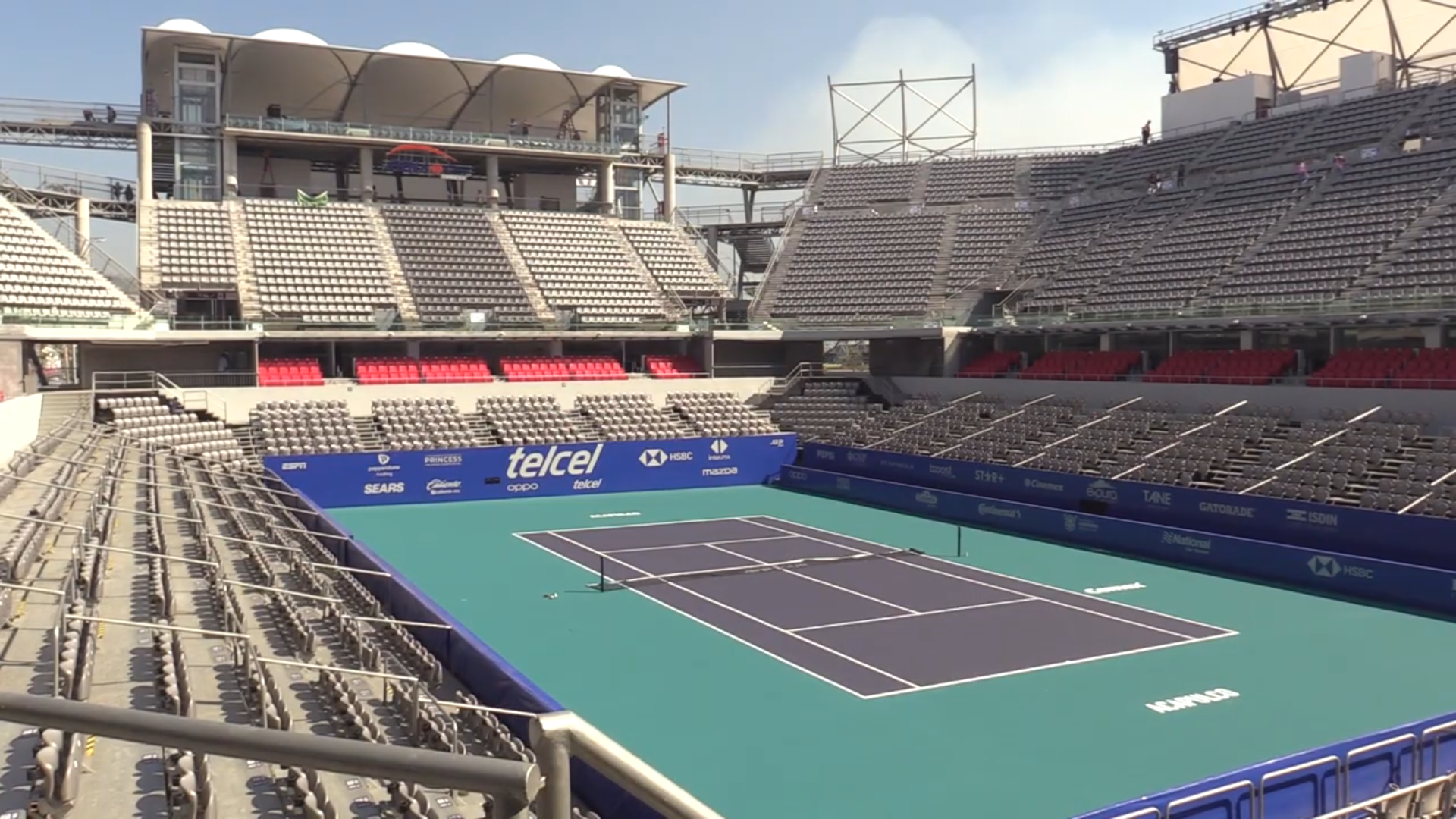
Center court

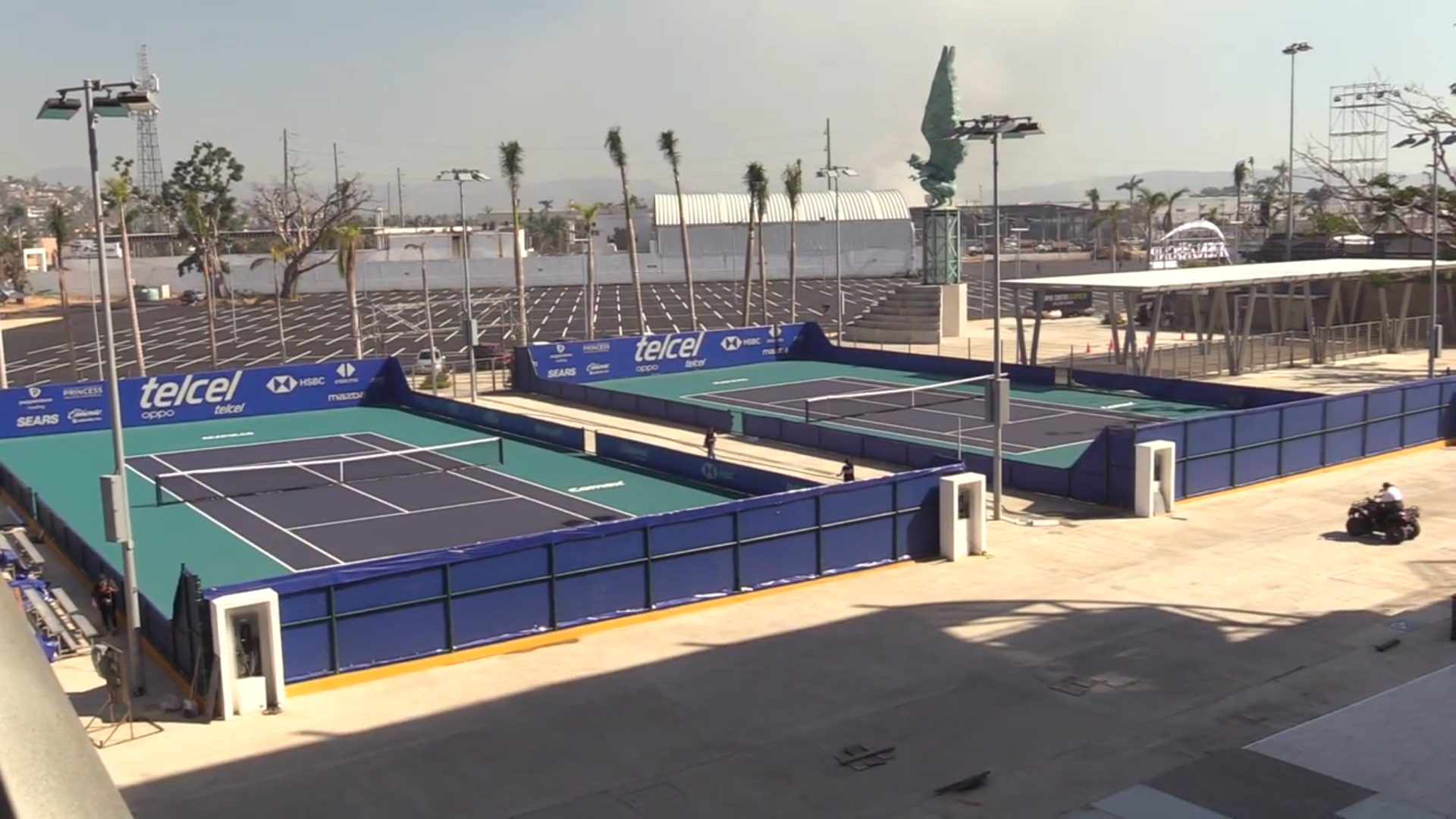
Practice courts
