= 2021 Abierto Mexicano Telcel =

- Date: 15–20 March
- Edition: 28th (men)
- Draw: 32S / 16D
- Surface: Hard, outdoor
- Location: Acapulco, Mexico
- Venue: Princess Mundo Imperial

Champions

Singles
- (Germany) Alexander Zverev

Doubles
- (United Kingdom) Ken Skupski / (United Kingdom) Neal Skupski
← 2020 ·	Mexican Open	· 2022 →

The 2021 Mexican Open (also known as the Abierto Mexicano Telcel presentado por HSBC for sponsorship reasons) was a professional tennis tournament played on outdoor hard courts. It was the 28th edition of the men's Mexican Open, and part of the 2021 ATP Tour. It took place in Acapulco, Mexico between 15 and 20 March 2021, at the Princess Mundo Imperial.

== Champions ==
=== Singles ===
- (Germany) Alexander Zverev def. (Greece) Stefanos Tsitsipas, 6–4, 7–6^{(7–3)}

=== Doubles ===
- (United Kingdom) Ken Skupski / (United Kingdom) Neal Skupski def. (Spain) Marcel Granollers / (Argentina) Horacio Zeballos, 7–6^{(7–3)}, 6–4

== Singles main-draw entrants ==
=== Seeds ===
Country	Player	Ranking^{1}	Seed
GRE	Stefanos Tsitsipas	4	1
GER	Alexander Zverev	6	2
ARG	Diego Schwartzman	9	3
CAN	Milos Raonic	15	4
BUL	Grigor Dimitrov	17	5
ITA	Fabio Fognini	18	6
CAN	Félix Auger-Aliassime	19	7
NOR	Casper Ruud	25	8

- ^{1} Rankings as of March 8, 2021.

=== Other entrants ===
The following players received wildcards into the main draw:

- (Spain) Carlos Alcaraz
- (United States) Sebastian Korda
- (Mexico) Gerardo López Villaseñor

The following player received entry using a protected ranking into the singles main draw:

- ~~(South Africa) Kevin Anderson~~

The following player received special exemption into the singles main draw:

- (Colombia) Daniel Elahi Galán

The following players received entry from the qualifying draw:

- (Netherlands) Tallon Griekspoor
- (United States) Stefan Kozlov
- (United States) Brandon Nakashima
- (Italy) Lorenzo Musetti

The following player received entry as a lucky loser:

- (United States) Denis Kudla

=== Withdrawals ===
Before the tournament

- (South Africa) Kevin Anderson → replaced by (United States) Denis Kudla
- (Spain) Pablo Andújar → replaced by (United States) Steve Johnson
- (Chile) Cristian Garín → replaced by (Italy) Salvatore Caruso
- (Argentina) Guido Pella → replaced by (United Kingdom) Cameron Norrie
- (United States) Sam Querrey → replaced by (Spain) Feliciano López

During the tournament

- (Norway) Casper Ruud

=== Retirements ===
- (France) Adrian Mannarino

== Doubles main-draw entrants ==
=== Seeds ===
Country	Player	Country	Player	Rank^{1}	Seed
ESP	Marcel Granollers	ARG	Horacio Zeballos	18	1
GBR	Jamie Murray	BRA	Bruno Soares	25	2
FRA	Pierre-Hugues Herbert	FRA	Nicolas Mahut	30	3
USA	Rajeev Ram	GBR	Joe Salisbury	32	4

- ^{1} Rankings as of March 8, 2021.

=== Other entrants ===
The following pairs received wildcards into the doubles main draw:

- (Brazil) Marcelo Demoliner / (Mexico) Santiago González
- (Germany) Alexander Zverev / (Germany) Mischa Zverev

The following pair received entry from the qualifying draw:

- (Australia) Luke Saville / (Australia) John-Patrick Smith

The following pair received entry as lucky losers:

- (Germany) Dominik Koepfer / (New Zealand) Artem Sitak

=== Withdrawals ===
- (Canada) Félix Auger-Aliassime / (Canada) Milos Raonic → (Germany) Dominik Koepfer / (New Zealand) Artem Sitak
