= 2022 Abierto Mexicano Telcel =

- Date: 21–26 February 2022
- Edition: 29th (Men)
- Draw: 32S / 16D
- Prize money: $1,832,890
- Surface: Hard, outdoor
- Location: Acapulco, Mexico
- Venue: Arena GNP Seguros

Champions

Singles
- (Spain) Rafael Nadal

Doubles
- (Spain) Feliciano López / (Greece) Stefanos Tsitsipas
← 2021 ·	Mexican Open	· 2023 →

The 2022 Mexican Open (also known as the Abierto Mexicano Telcel presentado por HSBC for sponsorship reasons) was a professional tennis tournament played on outdoor hard courts. It was the 29th edition of the men's Mexican Open, and part of the 2022 ATP Tour. The tournament took place in Acapulco, Mexico between 21 and 26 February 2022, at the new venue Arena GNP Seguros.

== Champions ==
=== Singles ===
- (Spain) Rafael Nadal def. (United Kingdom) Cameron Norrie 6–4, 6–4

=== Doubles ===
- (Spain) Feliciano López / (Greece) Stefanos Tsitsipas def. (El Salvador) Marcelo Arévalo / (Netherlands) Jean-Julien Rojer, 7–5, 6–4

== Points distribution and prize money ==
=== Points distribution ===
The players would receive the following points:

Event	W	F	SF	QF	Round of 16	Round of 32	Q	Q2	Q1
Men's singles	500	300	180	90	45	20	10	4	0
Men's doubles	500	300	180	90	0	—	—	—	—

=== Prize money ===
Event	W	F	SF	QF	Round of 16	Round of 32	Q2	Q1
Singles	$314,455	$169,500	$89,985	$45,975	$24,540	$13,090	$6,705	$3,765
Doubles*	$103,080	$54,970	$27,810	$13,920	$7,030	—	—	—

_{*per team}

== Singles main-draw entrants ==
=== Seeds ===
Country	Player	Ranking^{1}	Seed
RUS	Daniil Medvedev	2	1
GER	Alexander Zverev	3	2
GRE	Stefanos Tsitsipas	4	3
ESP	Rafael Nadal	5	4
ITA	Matteo Berrettini	6	5
GBR	Cameron Norrie	13	6
USA	Taylor Fritz	17	7
ESP	Pablo Carreño Busta	18	8

- ^{1} Rankings as of February 14, 2022.

=== Other entrants ===
The following players received wildcards into the main draw:

- (Mexico) Alex Hernández
- (Spain) Feliciano López
- (Spain) Fernando Verdasco

The following player received entry using a protected ranking into the singles main draw:

- (Spain) Pablo Andújar

The following player received special exempt into the main draw:

- (Australia) John Millman

The following players received entry from the qualifying draw:

- (Germany) Daniel Altmaier
- (Japan) Yoshihito Nishioka
- (Germany) Oscar Otte
- (United States) J. J. Wolf

The following players received entry as lucky losers:

- (Germany) Peter Gojowczyk
- (United States) Stefan Kozlov
- (United States) Denis Kudla

=== Withdrawals ===
Before the tournament

- (Spain) Carlos Alcaraz → replaced by (Germany) Peter Gojowczyk
- (United States) Maxime Cressy → replaced by (United States) Stefan Kozlov
- (United States) Reilly Opelka → replaced by (United States) Denis Kudla
- (United States) Frances Tiafoe → replaced by (France) Adrian Mannarino

During the tournament

- (Germany) Alexander Zverev (defaulted for unsportsmanlike conduct in doubles match)

=== Retirements ===
- (Italy) Matteo Berrettini

== Doubles main-draw entrants ==
=== Seeds ===
Country	Player	Country	Player	Rank^{1}	Seed
ESP	Marcel Granollers	ARG	Horacio Zeballos	13	1
COL	Juan Sebastián Cabal	COL	Robert Farah	22	2
GBR	Jamie Murray	BRA	Bruno Soares	38	3
ESA	Marcelo Arévalo	NED	Jean-Julien Rojer	63	4

- ^{1} Rankings as of February 14, 2022.

=== Other entrants ===
The following pairs received wildcards into the doubles main draw:

- (Mexico) Hans Hach Verdugo / (United States) John Isner
- (Spain) Feliciano López / (Greece) Stefanos Tsitsipas

The following pair received entry from the qualifying draw:

- (Australia) Luke Saville / (Australia) John-Patrick Smith

The following pairs received entry as lucky losers:

- (United Kingdom) Lloyd Glasspool / (Finland) Harri Heliövaara
- ~~(Spain) David Marrero / (Spain) Fernando Verdasco~~
- (Mexico) Miguel Ángel Reyes-Varela / (United States) Max Schnur

The following pairs received entry as alternates:

- (United Kingdom) Elbert Barr / (Mexico) Manuel Sánchez
- (Germany) Peter Gojowczyk / (Germany) Oscar Otte

=== Withdrawals ===
Before the tournament

- (Spain) Carlos Alcaraz / (Spain) Pablo Carreño Busta → replaced by (United Kingdom) Lloyd Glasspool / (Finland) Harri Heliövaara
- (Bulgaria) Grigor Dimitrov / (United States) Reilly Opelka → replaced by (Mexico) Miguel Ángel Reyes-Varela / (United States) Max Schnur
- (South Africa) Raven Klaasen / (Japan) Ben McLachlan → replaced by (Germany) Peter Gojowczyk / (Germany) Oscar Otte
- (Serbia) Dušan Lajović / (Croatia) Franko Škugor → replaced by (Serbia) Dušan Lajović / (Monaco) Hugo Nys
- (United Kingdom) Cameron Norrie / (United States) Tommy Paul → replaced by (United Kingdom) Elbert Barr / (Mexico) Manuel Sánchez
