= 2024 FIP calendar =

Tournament information
- Sport: Padel
- Location: Worldwide
- Dates: January 2024–December 2024

The 2024 FIP is the main global professional padel tour organized by the International Padel Federation (FIP). Since January 2024, the Tour comprises two tiers: Premier Padel and Cupra FIP Tour (Platinum, Gold, Star, Rise and Promotion). The season ends in December with Tour Finals featuring the best pairs in the world.

Premier Padel circuit was established by FIP in early 2022 with the financial support of Qatar Sports Investments and backed by Professional Padel Players Association (PPA). In August 2023, QSI acquired rival padel tour World Padel Tour to Damm, thus becoming the main global padel tour.

== Schedule ==
Key

World Championships
Tour Finals
Premier Padel (P1, P2 & Major)
Cupra FIP Tour (Platinum, Gold & Star)
Cupra FIP Tour (Rise & Promotion)

=== January ===
| Tournament | Men's winners | Men's runners-up | Women's winners | Women's runners-up |
|---|---|---|---|---|
| FIP Rise Australian Open; Sydney, Australia €12,500; 4–7 January 2024 | Manuel Vives (FRA); Julien Seurin (FRA); 6–4, 6–4 | Sergi Guimet (ESP); Nicolai Maniucov (ESP) | Patricia García (ESP); Nerea Guerra (ESP); 6–3, 7–6^{4} | Hanna Maddock (GBR); Catherine Rose (GBR) |
| FIP Promotion Melbourne Open; Melbourne, Australia €5,500; 12–14 January 2024 | Manuel Vives (FRA); Julien Seurin (FRA); 4–6, 6–4, 6–3 | Sergi Guimet (ESP); Nicolai Maniucov (ESP) | Patricia García (ESP); Nerea Guerra (ESP); 6–1, 7–5 | Akane Kamo (JPN); Kotomi Ozawa (JPN) |
| FIP Rise Betsson Sweden I Gothenburg, Sweden €12,500; 19–21 January 2024 | Daniel Santigosa (ESP); Guillermo Collado (ESP); 6–3, 6–4 | Iago González (ESP); Alberto Gª Jiménez (ESP) | Jessica Ginier (FRA); Carla Touly (FRA); 6–4, 6–1 | Amanda Girdo (SWE); Carla Rodríguez (ESP) |
| FIP Promotion La Cala; Finestrat, Spain €5,000; 26–28 January 2024 | Javi Rico (ESP); Juanlu Esbrí (ESP); 4–6, 7–6, 6–3 | Mario Ortega (ESP); Nacho Piotto (ARG) | Camila Fassio (ESP); Raquel Eugenio (ESP); 4–6, 7–6, 6–3 | Elena de la Rosa (ESP); Jana Montes (ESP) |
| FIP Promotion Qatar; Doha, Qatar €2,500; 24–28 January 2024 | Javi Navarro (ESP); Mohammed Al-Kuwari (QAT); 7–5, 6–4 | Max Cucurull (ESP); Guillem Arnó (ESP) | No women's draw | |

=== February ===
| Tournament | Men's winners | Men's runners-up | Women's winners | Women's runners-up |
|---|---|---|---|---|
| FIP Rise Viña del Mar; Viña del Mar, Chile €8,750; 16–18 February 2024 | Maxi Sánchez (ARG); Santiago Rolla (ARG); 6–3, 6–4 | Pepe Aliaga (ESP); Daniel Martínez (ESP) | Gabriela Roux (CHL); Giannina Minieri (CHL); 6–3, 7–5 | Catalina Arancibia (CHL); Kimberley Ahumada (CHL) |
| FIP Promotion Castellón; Castellón de la Plana, Spain €5,000; 16–18 February 2024 | Teo Gamondi (ARG); Facundo Dehnike (PAR); 6–3, 3–6, 6–3 | Matias Nicoletti (ITA); Adrián Rodríguez (ESP) | Camila Fassio (ESP); Raquel Eugenio (ESP); 6–4, 6–1 | Ares Llobera (ESP); Maite Cano (ESP) |
| FIP Promotion Jaén; Jaén, Spain €5,000; 16–18 February 2024 | Pablo Pastor (ESP); Eneko Arija (ESP); 6–2, 6–4 | David Torregrosa (ESP); Juan Pedro Ramírez (ESP) | Natividad López (ESP); Laura Luján (ESP); 6–3, 6–4 | Marianela Montesi (ITA); Aitana García (ESP) |
| FIP Rise Betsson Sweden II; Gothenburg, Sweden €12,500; 23–25 February 2024 | Daniel Santigosa (ESP); Guillermo Collado (ESP); 7–6^{5}, 6–2 | Pablo Castillo (ESP); Cándido Alfaro (ESP) | Natividad López (ESP); Laura Luján (ESP)^{3}6–7, 7–5, 6–3 | Elena de la Rosa (ESP); Alba Gallardo (ESP) |
| Premier Padel P1 Riyadh; Riyadh, Saudi Arabia €470,000; 26 February–2 March 2024 | Alejandro Galán (ESP); Juan Lebrón (ESP); 6–7, 6–4, 6–4 | Arturo Coello (ESP); Agustín Tapia (ARG) | Ariana Sánchez (ESP); Paula Josemaría (ESP); 6–3, 6–2 | Beatriz González (ESP); Delfina Brea (ARG) |

=== March ===
| Tournament | Men's winners | Men's runners-up | Women's winners | Women's runners-up |
|---|---|---|---|---|
| FIP Rise Kaunas; Kaunas, Lithuania €6,250; 1–3 March 2024 | Giulio Graziotti (ITA); Flavio Abbate (ITA); 7–5, 6–3 | Max Sjöwall (FIN); Juan Pablo Andrada (ARG) | No women's draw | |
| Premier Padel Ooredoo Qatar Major; Doha, Qatar €525,000; 26 February–2 March 2024 | Arturo Coello (ESP); Agustín Tapia (ARG); 6–0, 6–2 | Miguel Yanguas (ESP); Javi Garrido (ESP) | Ariana Sánchez (ESP); Paula Josemaría (ESP); 6–3, 6–1 | Gemma Triay (ESP); Claudia Fernández (ESP) |
| FIP Promotion Cairo; Cairo, Egypt €5,000; 7–9 March 2024 | Thijs Roper (NED); Georges Wakim (EGY); 6–4, 6–1 | Ferrán González (ESP); Diego Dorta (ESP) | Aimee Gibson (GBR); Paula Canivell (ESP); 6–3, 6–2 | Denise Höfer (GER); Victoria Kurz (GER) |
| FIP Promotion Alicante; Alicante, Spain €5,000; 8–10 March 2024 | Pol Hernández (ESP); Ramiro Valenzuela (ARG); 6–1, 6–2 | Marc Sintes (ESP); Pau Miñano (ESP) | Mari Paz Hermida (ESP); Eva Jiménez (ESP); 6–3, 6–4 | Liza Groenveld (NED); Bo Luttikhuis (NED) |
| FIP Rise Santiago; Santiago, Chile €8,750; 15–17 March 2024 | Pol Hernández (ESP); Dylan Cuello (ARG); 6–4, 5–7, 6–1 | Nico Egea (ARG); Tomás Luco (ARG) | Giannina Minieri (CHL); Gabriela Roux (CHL); 6–3, 6–4 | Silvana de Angelis (CHL); Florencia Ernandorena (ARG) |
| Premier Padel P1 GNP Mexico; Acapulco, Mexico €470,000; 20–24 March 2024 | Arturo Coello (ESP); Agustín Tapia (ARG); 6–0, 6–4 | Alejandro Galán (ESP); Juan Lebrón (ESP) | Jessica Castelló (ESP); Claudia Jensen (ARG); 6–3, 6–4 | Sofia Araújo (POR); Virginia Riera (ARG) |
| FIP Rise Dubai; Dubai, United Arab Emirates €12,500; 21–24 March 2024 | Pol Hernández (ESP); Ramiro Valenzuela (ARG); 6–4, 6–4 | Pedro Araújo (POR); Miguel Deus (POR) | Lucía Pérez (ESP); Laura Luján (ESP); 6–4, 6–2 | Wendy Barsotti (FRA); Catarina Castro (POR) |
| Premier Padel P2 Puerto Cabello; Puerto Cabello, Venezuela €235,000; 25–31 March 2024 | Arturo Coello (ESP); Agustín Tapia (ARG); 2–6, 6–3, 6–3 | Alejandro Galán (ESP); Federico Chingotto (ARG) | Beatriz González (ESP); Delfina Brea (ARG); 6–4, 6–3 | Alejandra Salazar (ESP); Tamara Icardo (ESP) |
| FIP Rise Rocks Lane; London, Great Britain €12,500; 29–31 March 2024 | Giulio Graziotti (ITA); Flavio Abbate (ITA); 6–2, 6–3 | Simon Vasquez (SWE); Álvaro Montiel (ESP) | Lorena Alonso (ESP); Ana Varo (ESP); 6–7, 6–2, 6–3 | Natividad López (ESP); Laura Luján (ESP) |

=== April ===
| Tournament | Men's winners | Men's runners-up | Women's winners | Women's runners-up |
|---|---|---|---|---|
| FIP Rise Cairo; Cairo, Egypt €12,500; 3–6 April 2024 | Belar Vera (ESP); Christian Medina (GBR); 7–5, 4–6, 7–6 | Maxime Moreau (FRA); Johan Bergeron (FRA) | Patricia Araus (ESP); Mª Cristina López (ESP); 6–4, 6–2 | Lorena Alonso (ESP); Lucía Pérez (ESP) |
| FIP Rise Betsson Sweden III; Gothenburg, Sweden €6,250; 5–7 April 2024 | Simon Vasquez (SWE); Álvaro Montiel (ESP); 7–6, 6–4^{6} | Álvaro Mélendez (ESP); Pedro Meléndez (ESP) | No women's draw | |
| FIP Rise Buenos Aires; Buenos Aires, Argentina €6,250; 5–7 April 2024 | Maxi Sánchez (ARG); Federico Chiostri (ARG); 5–7, 6–4, 6–2 | Santiago Rolla (ARG); Matías del Moral (ARG) | No women's draw | |
| FIP Promotion Betsson Sweden III; Gothenburg, Sweden €2,500; 6–7 April 2024 | No men's draw | | Jana Montes (ESP); Martina Calvo (ESP); 6–0, 6–3 | Liza Groenveld (NED); Rosalie van der Hoek (NED) |
| FIP Rise Monaco; Monte Carlo, Monaco €6,250; 5–9 April 2024 | Daniel Santigosa (ESP); Guillermo Collado (ESP); 6–4, 4–6, 6–1 | Dylan Guichard (FRA); Bastien Blanqué (FRA) | No women's draw | |
| FIP Rise Aquahobby Isla de la Palma; Los Llanos de Aridane, Spain €12,500; 11–13 April 2024 | Íñigo Jofre (ESP); Luis Hernández (ESP); 6–1, 6–4 | Álvaro Cepero (ESP); Miguel Benítez (ESP) | Raquel Eugenio (ESP); Jana Montes (ESP); 6–3, 6–1 | Arantxa Soriano (ESP); Martina Fassio (ESP) |
| FIP Rise Metepec; Metepec, Mexico €12,500; 11–13 April 2024 | Antonio Luque (ESP); Pedro Araújo (POR); 1–6, 6–4, 6–3 | Matías Almada (ARG); Juan Manuel Argañaras (ARG) | Adriana Corona (MEX); Fernanda Salazar (MEX); 7–5, 3–6, 6–4 | Ana Belén Fernández (MEX); Natalia Blanco (MEX) |
| FIP Rise Pala Padel Nola; Nola, Italy €12,500; 12–14 April 2024 | Giulio Graziotti (ITA); Flavio Abbate (ITA); 2–6, 6–4, 6–4 | Denis Perino (ITA); Dylan Cuello (ARG) | Letizia Manquillo (ESP); Noemí Aguilar (ESP); 3–6, 7–6^{4}, 7–6^{6} | Erika Zanchetta (ITA); Martina Parmigiani (ITA) |
| Premier Padel P2 Lotto Brussels; Brussels, Belgium €235,000; 23–28 April 2024 | Alejandro Galán (ESP); Federico Chingotto (ARG); 6–4, ^{4}6–7, 6–2 | Arturo Coello (ESP); Agustín Tapia (ARG) | Beatriz González (ESP); Delfina Brea (ARG); 6–4, 6–4 | Gemma Triay (ESP); Claudia Fernández (ESP) |
| FIP Promotion Sharjah; Sharjah, United Arab Emirates €5,000; 25–28 April 2024 | Sergio Icardo (ESP); Fran Jurado (ESP); 7–5, 6–2 | Facundo Erguy (ARG); José Antonio Arcos (ESP) | Tia Norton (GBR); Silvia López (ESP); 6–3, 7–5 | Gimena Sol (ARG); Constanza Vega (ARG) |
| FIP Rise Argentina II; Buenos Aires, Argentina €12,500; 26–28 April 2024 | Leonel Aguirre (ARG); Gonzalo Alfonso (ARG); 6–2, 6–1 | Pol Hernández (ESP); Ramiro Valenzuela (ARG) | Ana Domínguez (ESP); Laura Luján (ESP); 6–0, 6–1 | Gabriela Roux (CHL); Giannina Minieri (CHL) |

=== May ===
| Tournament | Men's winners | Men's runners-up | Women's winners | Women's runners-up |
|---|---|---|---|---|
| Premier Padel P2 Sevilla; Seville, Spain €235,000; 30 April–5 May 2024 | Alejandro Galán (ESP); Federico Chingotto (ARG); 7–6^{6}, 6–4 | Martín di Nenno (ARG); Franco Stupaczuk (ARG) | Beatriz González (ESP); Delfina Brea (ARG); 6–1, 6–1 | Ariana Sánchez (ESP); Paula Josemaría (ESP) |
| FIP Rise Doha; Doha, Qatar €12,500; 1–5 May 2024 | Youssef Hossam (EGY); Julián Lacamoire (ARG); 6–2, 6–4 | Marco Cassetta (ITA); Dylan Cuello (ARG) | Marcella Koek (NED); Rosalie van der Hoek (NED); 4–6, 6–4, 6–4 | Rocío Soto (ARG); Claudia Manzanares (ESP) |
| FIP Rise Burriana; Burriana, Spain €12,500; 3–5 May 2024 | Denis Perino (ITA); Nacho Piotto (ARG); 6–3, 6–2 | Albert Trillas (ESP); Manu Castaño (ESP) | Jana Montes (ESP); Martina Calvo (ESP); 7–6^{5}, 7–6^{5} | Valeria Atencia (ESP); Catarina Castro (POR) |
| FIP Rise Delta Padel; Camboriú, Brazil €6,250; 3–5 May 2024 | Pol Hernández (ESP); Ramiro Valenzuela (ARG); 3–6, 6–0, 6–1 | João Pedro Flores (BRA); Stefano Flores (BRA) | No women's draw | |
| FIP Promotion Antalya I Antalya, Turkey €2,500; 3–5 May 2024 | Simone Cremona (ITA); Lorenzo di Giovanni (ITA); 6–3, 6–7, 7–6 | Giulio Graziotti (ITA); Flavio Abbate (ITA) | No women's draw | |
| FIP Promotion Camboriú; Camboriú, Brazil €2,500; 3–5 May 2024 | No men's draw | | Susane Lenz (BRA); Alessandra de Barros (BRA); 7–5, 6–0 | Marina Brandão (BRA); Julia Cirne (BRA) |
| FIP Rise BaPadel Barcelona; Sant Esteve Sesrovires, Spain €12,500; 10–12 May 2024 | Miguel Deus (POR); Nuno Deus (POR); 3–6, 7–6, 6–4 | Mario Huete (ESP); Daniel Santigosa (ESP) | Jana Montes (ESP); Raquel Eugenio (ESP); 7–6, 7–6 | Amanda López (ESP); Raquel Segura (ESP) |
| FIP Promotion Teramo; Teramo, Italy €5,000; 10–12 May 2024 | Giulio Graziotti (ITA); Flavio Abbate (ITA); 3–6, 7–6^{5}, 6–2 | Lorenzo di Giovanni (ITA); Riccardo Sinicropi (ITA) | Aida Martínez (ESP); Carla Serrano (ESP); 6–3, 6–4 | Caterina Baldi (ITA); Giulia Dal Pozzo (ITA) |
| Premier Padel P2 Asunción; Asunción, Paraguay €235,000; 13–19 May 2024 | Arturo Coello (ESP); Agustín Tapia (ARG); 6–1, 3–6, 7–6^{1} | Alejandro Galán (ESP); Federico Chingotto (ARG) | Beatriz González (ESP); Delfina Brea (ARG); 6–3, 7–5 | Gemma Triay (ESP); Claudia Fernández (ESP) |
| FIP Rise Diputación de Málaga; Marbella, Spain €12,500; 16–19 May 2024 | Mario del Castillo (ESP); Rafael Méndez (ESP); 4–6, 7–6^{6}, 6–4 | Cayetano Rocafort (ESP); Alejandro Jerez (ESP) | Valeria Atencia (ESP); Ainara Pozuelo (ESP); 6–4, 7–6^{6} | Claudia Escacena (ESP); Sara Foguer (ESP) |
| FIP Promotion Giulianova; Giulianova, Italy €5,000; 16–19 May 2024 | Michele Bruno (ITA); Joshua Pirraglia (ITA); 6–1, 3–6, 6–3 | Giulio Graziotti (ITA); Flavio Abbate (ITA) | Aida Martínez (ESP); Carla Serrano (ESP); 6–0, ^{7}6–7, 6–3 | Margarida Fernandes (POR); Maaike Betz (NED) |
| FIP Rise Sweden IV; Gothenburg, Sweden €6,250; 17–19 May 2024 | Pablo Castillo (ESP); Cándido Alfaro (ESP); 3–6, 6–1, 7–5 | Albin Olsson (SWE); Linus Frost (SWE) | No women's draw | |
| FIP Rise Cairo; Cairo, Egypt €12,500; 23–25 May 2024 | Youssef Hossam (EGY); Julián Lacamoire (ARG); 6–3, 6–4 | Giulio Graziotti (ITA); Flavio Abbate (ITA) | Lucía Micaela (ESP); Camila Fassio (ESP); 6–3, 4–6, 7–6^{5} | María Portillo (ESP); Catarina Castro (POR) |
| Premier Padel P1 Mar del Plata; Mar del Plata, Argentina €470,000; 20–26 May 2024 | Alejandro Galán (ESP); Federico Chingotto (ARG); 2–6, 6–2, 6–2 | Arturo Coello (ESP); Agustín Tapia (ARG) | Ariana Sánchez (ESP); Paula Josemaría (ESP); 6–1, 5–7, 6–4 | Beatriz González (ESP); Delfina Brea (ARG) |
| FIP Rise Hamburg; Hamburg, Germany €6,250; 31 May–2 June 2024 | Manuel Aragón (ESP); Curro Cabeza (ESP); 6–4, 6–4 | Jaume Romera (ESP); Pau Miñano (ESP) | No women's draw | |
| FIP Promotion Città dei Templi; Agrigento, Italy €5,000; 31 May–2 June 2024 | Giulio Graziotti (ITA); Flavio Abbate (ITA); 6–3, 6–4 | Nicolas Brusa (ITA); Simone Iacovino (ITA) | Margarida Fernandes (POR); Catarina Santos (POR); 2–6, 7–6^{6}, 6–4 | Aida Martínez (ESP); Valentina Tommasi (ITA) |
| Premier Padel P1 Banco de Chile Santiago; Santiago, Chile €470,000; 28 May–3 June 2024 | Arturo Coello (ESP); Agustín Tapia (ARG); 6–0, 4–6, 6–4 | Alejandro Galán (ESP); Federico Chingotto (ARG) | Gemma Triay (ESP); Claudia Fernández (ESP); 6–1, 6–4 | Lucía Sainz (ESP); Patricia Llaguno (ESP) |

=== June ===
| Tournament | Men's winners | Men's runners-up | Women's winners | Women's runners-up |
|---|---|---|---|---|
| FIP Rise Riyadh; Riyadh, Saudi Arabia €12,500; 6–8 June 2024 | Tonet Sans (ESP); David Gala (ESP); 6–3, 6–1 | Miguel Melero (ESP); Iago González (ESP) | Alba Gallardo (ESP); Anna Ortiz (ESP); 7–6^{3}, 6–1 | Ana Domínguez (ESP); Laura Luján (ESP) |
| Premier Padel P2 Bordeaux; Bordeaux, France €250,000; 11–16 June 2024 | Coki Nieto (ESP); Jon Sanz (ESP); 6–1, 6–4 | Momo González (ESP); Álex Ruiz (ESP) | Gemma Triay (ESP); Claudia Fernández (ESP); 7–5, 7–5 | Marta Ortega (ESP); Verónica Virseda (ESP) |
| FIP Rise Talca; Talca, Chile €6,250; 14–16 June 2024 | Mauricio Rivero (ARG); Fran Britos (ARG); 6–3, 6–0 | Juani Rubini (ARG); Sergio Nieto (ESP) | No women's draw | |
| FIP Rise Tenerife; Puerto de la Cruz, Spain €12,500; 20–22 June 2024 | Matías del Moral (ARG); Juani de Pascual (ARG); 6–4, 6–0 | Maxi Sánchez (ARG); Federico Chiostri (ARG) | María Portillo (ESP); Kaori Peco (ESP); 6–3, 3–6, 6–1 | Valeria Atencia (ESP); Mafalda Fernandes (POR) |
| FIP Promotion Zétrud-Lumay; Zétrud-Lumay, Belgium €5,000; 20–22 June 2024 | Bram Meijer (NED); Sten Richters (NED); 6–3, 3–6, 6–1 | Clément Geens (BEL); François Azzola (BEL) | Rosalie van der Hoek (NED); Elyne Boeykens (BEL); 6–4, 6–4 | Elizabeth Wyckaert (BEL); Noemi Sermant (BEL) |
| Premier Padel BNL Italy Major; Rome, Italy €525,000; 17–23 June 2024 | Alejandro Galán (ESP); Federico Chingotto (ARG); 6–4, 4–6, 6–1 | Arturo Coello (ESP); Agustín Tapia (ARG) | Ariana Sánchez (ESP); Paula Josemaría (ESP); 6–1, 6–0 | Lucía Sainz (ESP); Patricia Llaguno (ESP) |
| FIP Rise Cordenons; Cordenons, Italy €12,500; 21–23 June 2024 | Albin Olsson (SWE); Adam Axelsson (SWE); 6–3, 6–4 | Guillem Figuerola (ESP); Guillermo Casal (ESP) | Lucía García (ESP); Natividad López (ESP); 6–1, 6–3 | Maaike Betz (NED); Aimee Gibson (GBR) |
| FIP Gold Valladolid; Valladolid, Spain €50,000; 27–29 June 2024 | Javi Rico (ESP); Juanlu Esbrí (ESP); 6–3, 4–6, 6–3 | José Solano (ESP); Luis Hernández (ESP) | Lorena Rufo (ESP); Beatriz Caldera (ESP); 6–3, 3–6, 6–2 | Marta Borrero (ESP); Sandra Bellver (ESP) |
| FIP Rise Biella; Sandigliano, Italy €12,500; 28–30 June 2024 | José Luis González (ESP); Marco Cassetta (ITA); 6–1, 6–2 | Jaume Romera (ESP); Pau Miñano (ESP) | Emily Stellato (ITA); Giulia Sussarello (ITA); 6–2, 6–4 | Ainara Pozuelo (ESP); Eugènia Guimet (ESP) |

=== July ===
| Tournament | Men's winners | Men's runners-up | Women's winners | Women's runners-up |
|---|---|---|---|---|
| FIP Rise Prodigy Padel APP; Estepona, Spain €12,500; 4–6 July 2024 | Carlos Martí (ESP); José Luis González (ESP); 6–2, 4–6, 7–6 | Roberto Belmont (ESP); Eduardo Herrero (ESP) | Laura Luján (ESP); Claudia Escacena (ESP); 6–7, 7–6, 6–2 | Ana Varo (ESP); Amanda Girdo (SWE) |
| Premier Padel P2 Genova; Genoa, Italy €250,000; 3–7 July 2024 | Alejandro Galán (ESP); Federico Chingotto (ARG); 6–1, 6–1 | Arturo Coello (ESP); Agustín Tapia (ARG) | Marta Ortega (ESP); Sofia Araújo (POR); 6–3, 7–6^{1} | Ariana Sánchez (ESP); Paula Josemaría (ESP) |
| FIP Rise Delta Padel II; Camboriú, Brazil €6,250; 5–7 July 2024 | Matheus Simonato (BRA); Lucas Cunha (BRA); 7–5, 6–1 | Teo Gamondi (ITA); Facundo Dehnike (PAR) | No women's draw | |
| FIP Promotion Chiba; Chiba, Japan €2,500; 5–7 July 2024 | Manuel Vives (FRA); Julien Seurin (FRA); 6–3, 7–6^{4} | Bart van Opstal (NED); Menno Nolten (NED) | No women's draw | |
| FIP Promotion Camboriú II; Camboriú, Brazil €2,500; 5–7 July 2024 | No men's draw | | Fernanda Abarzúa (BRA); Gabriela Menna (BRA); 6–3, 6–2 | Susane Lenz (BRA); Alessandra de Barros (BRA) |
| FIP Gold Saltillo; Saltillo, Mexico €50,000; 10–13 July 2024 | Gonzalo Rubio (ESP); Agustín Torre (ARG); 7–6, 6–3 | Miki Solbes (ESP); Aitor García (ESP) | Alix Collombon (FRA); Julieta Bidahorria (ARG); 6–4, 6–3 | Catarina Santos (POR); Camila Ramme (MEX) |
| FIP Rise D-Bay; Mersa Matruh, Egypt €12,500; 10–13 July 2024 | Youssef Hossam (EGY); Julián Lacamoire (ARG); 6–3, 6–3 | Manuel Vives (FRA); Julien Seurin (FRA) | Marianela Montesi (ITA); Margarida Fernandes (POR); 3–6, 6–3, 6–2 | Rosalie van der Hoek (NED); Élodie Invernon (FRA) |
| Premier Padel P1 Málaga; Málaga, Spain €470,000; 9–14 July 2024 | Arturo Coello (ESP); Agustín Tapia (ARG); 6–2, 6–3 | Alejandro Galán (ESP); Federico Chingotto (ARG) | Ariana Sánchez (ESP); Paula Josemaría (ESP); 1–6, 6–4, 6–2 | Gemma Triay (ESP); Claudia Fernández (ESP) |
| FIP Rise Koksijde; Koksijde, Belgium €12,500; 12–14 July 2024 | Alonso Rodríguez (ESP); Daniel Santigosa (ESP); 6–4, 6–1 | Albin Olsson (SWE); Adam Axelsson (SWE) | Lucía García (ESP); Natividad López (ESP); 6–2, 6–4 | Helena Wyckaert (BEL); Amanda Girdo (SWE) |
| FIP Rise Viña del Mar; Viña del Mar, Chile €6,250; 12–14 July 2024 | Luciano Puppo (ARG); Leonardo Yob (ARG); 7–5, 6–3 | Axel Guevara (ARG); Manuel Gayone (ARG) | No women's draw | |
| FIP Platinum Sardegna; Cagliari, Italy €120,000; 16–20 July 2024 | Momo González (ESP); Edu Alonso (ESP); 6–2, 6–2 | Álvaro Cepero (ESP); Pablo Lijó (ESP) | Nuria Rodríguez (ESP); Carolina Orsi (ITA); 6–2, ^{7}6–7, 6–3 | Aranzazu Osoro (ARG); Marta Marrero (ESP) |
| FIP Promotion Valencia; Valencia, Spain €5,000; 19–21 July 2024 | Alonso Rodríguez (ESP); Daniel Santigosa (ESP); 6–1, 6–2 | Mario Huete (ESP); Adrián Marqués (ESP) | Elena de la Rosa (ESP); Teresa Moríñigo (ESP); 3–6, 6–2, 6–2 | Aitana García (ESP); Carla Serrano (ESP) |
| FIP European Championships; Cagliari, Italy n/a 22–27 July 2024 | Spain; 2–0 | Italy | Spain; 2–1 | Italy |
| FIP Rise Allesvoorpadel; Lelystad, Netherlands €6,250; 26–28 July 2024 | Diego Gil (ESP); Miguel González (ESP); 2–6, 6–4, 6–2 | Alonso Rodríguez (ESP); Daniel Santigosa (ESP) | No women's draw | |
| Premier Padel P2 Finland; Nokia, Finland €250,000; 30 July–4 August 2024 | Juan Lebrón (ESP); Martín di Nenno (ARG); 7–5, 6–3 | Coki Nieto (ESP); Jon Sanz (ESP) | Paula Josemaría (ESP); Ariana Sánchez (ESP); 6–3, 6–1 | Marta Ortega (ESP); Sofia Araújo (POR) |

=== August ===
| Tournament | Men's winners | Men's runners-up | Women's winners | Women's runners-up |
|---|---|---|---|---|
| FIP Promotion Villacarrillo; Villacarrillo, Spain €5,000; 8–11 August 2024 | Sergio Esteban (ESP); Hugo Portillo (ESP); 6–4, 4–6, 6–3 | Javi Rodríguez (ESP); Roberto Belmont (ESP) | Daiara Valenzuela (ARG); María Laura Ferreyra (ARG); 6–2, 5–7, 6–2 | Aida Martínez (ESP); Natividad López (ESP) |
| FIP Star Gran Canaria; Las Palmas, Spain €25,000; 16–18 August 2024 | Momo González (ESP); Edu Alonso (ESP); 1–6, 6–4, 6–3 | Jairo Bautista (ESP); Jose Jiménez (ESP) | Martina Fassio (ESP); Raquel Eugenio (ESP); 6–1, 6–2 | Carla Mesa (ESP); Marta Marrero (ESP) |
| FIP Rise Villa Mercede Cup; Frascati, Italy €12,500; 16–18 August 2024 | Clément Geens (BEL); Juani Rubini (ARG); 7–5, 6–3 | Giulio Graziotti (ITA); Flavio Abbate (ITA) | Léa Godallier (FRA); Giulia Sussarello (ITA); 7–6, 6–1 | Nuria Vivancos (ESP); Lucía Peralta (ESP) |
| FIP Rise Box to Box; Bandol, France €12,500; 22–25 August 2024 | Marco Cassetta (ITA); Álvaro Montiel (ESP)^{4}6–7, 6–2, 6–4 | Pol Hernández (ESP); Ramiro Valenzuela (ARG) | Carla Touly (FRA); Jessica Ginier (FRA); 7–6^{0}, 6–2 | Ana Domínguez (ESP); Lucía Pérez (ESP) |
| FIP Rise Córdoba; Córdoba, Spain €12,500; 22–25 August 2024 | Jairo Bautista (ESP); Fran Guerrero (ESP); 6–2, 6–3 | Miguel Semmler (ESP); Guillermo Collado (ESP) | Lucía Peralta (ESP); Nuria Vivancos (ESP); 6–2, 6–2 | Aida Martínez (ESP); Martina Parmigiani (ITA) |
| FIP Rise Mol; Mol, Belgium €12,500; 23–25 August 2024 | Thomas Leygue (FRA); Clément Geens (BEL); 6–0, 6–4 | Marcos Córdoba (ESP); Cándido Alfaro (ESP) | Lucía García (ESP); Natividad López (ESP); 7–5, 6–4 | An-Sophie Mestach (BEL); Elyne Boeykens (BEL) |
| FIP Rise Copiapó; Copiapó, Chile €6,250; 23–25 August 2024 | Nacho Piotto (ARG); Tomás Posse (ARG); 6–3, 6–3 | Cristóbal Martínez (CHL); Pablo Molina (ARG) | No women's draw | |
| FIP Promotion Copiapó; Copiapó, Chile €2,500; 24–25 August 2024 | No men's draw | | Fiorella Propato (ARG); Francesca Floriani (ARG); 7–6, 6–2 | Catalina Arancibia (CHL); Noelia Suárez (ARG) |
| FIP Promotion Curitiba; Curitiba, Brazil €2,500; 24–25 August 2024 | No men's draw | | Alessandra de Barros (BRA); Cristina Cirne (BRA); 7–5, 4–6, 7–5 | Fernanda Abarzúa (BRA); Gabriela Menna (BRA) |
| FIP Rise PadelCopa Utrecht; Utrecht, Netherlands €12,500; 29 August–1 September 2024 | Jaume Romera (ESP); Diego Dorta (ESP); 6–2, 6–4 | Simone Cremona (ITA); Afonso Fazendeiro (POR) | Carolina Navarro (SWE); Patricia Martínez (ESP); 6–3, 6–2 | María Portillo (ESP); Ainara Pozuelo (ESP) |
| FIP Rise HOP London Padel Open; London, Great Britain €12,500; 30 August–1 September 2024 | Manuel Vives (FRA); Eneko Arija (ESP); 7–6^{5}, 0–6, 6–3 | Pincho Fernández (ESP); Jose Jiménez (ESP) | María Laura Ferreyra (ARG); Eugènia Guimet (ESP); 7–5, ^{8}6–7, 6–2 | Lucía Pérez (ESP); Marianela Montesi (ITA) |
| FIP Rise OK Sport Sant'Elpidio; Porto Sant'Elpidio, Italy €6,250; 31 August–1 September 2024 | Cristian Gutiérrez (ARG); Carlos Martí (ESP); 6–4, 6–4 | Facundo Domínguez (ITA); Emilio Chamero (ESP) | No women's draw | |

=== September ===
| Tournament | Men's winners | Men's runners-up | Women's winners | Women's runners-up |
|---|---|---|---|---|
| FIP European Junior Championships – Pairs; Budapest, Hungary n/a 1–7 September 2024 | Pablo Reina (ESP); Noé Sánchez (ESP); 7–5, 1–5, 7–5 | Curro Cabeza (ESP); Manuel Aragón (ESP) | Carla Fernández (ESP); Diana Toledo (ESP); 6–4, 6–4 | Camila Fassio (ESP); Sandra Oliveras (ESP) |
| FIP European Junior Championships – Teams; Budapest, Hungary n/a 2–7 September 2024 | Spain; 2–1 | France | Spain; 3–0 | Italy |
| Premier Padel P1 Conunidad de Madrid; Madrid, Spain €470,000; 2–8 September 2024 | Arturo Coello (ESP); Agustín Tapia (ARG); 6–3, 7–6^{3} | Alejandro Galán (ESP); Federico Chingotto (ARG) | Gemma Triay (ESP); Claudia Fernández (ESP); 6–2, 2–1^{rtd.} | Delfina Brea (ARG); Beatriz González (ESP) |
| Premier Padel P1 Rotterdam; Rotterdam, Netherlands €470,000; 10–15 September 2024 | Arturo Coello (ESP); Agustín Tapia (ARG); 6–2, 6–2 | Alejandro Galán (ESP); Federico Chingotto (ARG) | Ariana Sánchez (ESP); Paula Josemaría (ESP); 6–4, 6–4 | Gemma Triay (ESP); Claudia Fernández (ESP) |
| FIP Rise Ciudad de Ceuta; Ceuta, Spain €12,500; 13–15 September 2024 | Jairo Bautista (ESP); Fran Guerrero (ESP); 6–1, 6–0 | Adrián Naranjo (ESP); Marcel Font (ESP) | Lucía García (ESP); Natividad López (ESP); 6–2, 6–1 | Margarida Fernandes (POR); Aimee Gibson (GBR) |
| FIP Rise La Serena; La Serena, Chile €12,500; 13–15 September 2024 | Axel Guevara (ARG); Manuel Gayone (ARG); 6–2, 4–6, 7–5 | Nico Egea (ARG); Tomás Luco (ARG) | No women's draw | |
| FIP Rise Sweden V Gothenburg, Sweden €6,250; 13–15 September 2024 | Miguel Deus (POR); Nuno Deus (POR); 6–1, 6–0 | Linus Frost (SWE); Daniel Appelgren (SWE) | No women's draw | |
| FIP Panamerican Junior Championships – Pairs; Aguascalientes, Mexico n/a 17–21 September 2024 | Matías León (VEN); Santiago Soto (VEN); 6–4, 6–4 | Jorge Jiménez (MEX); Diego Arredondo (MEX) | Ximena Muñoz (MEX); Renata Martínez (MEX); 6–4, 6–0 | Ivana Perches (MEX); Melissa Rodríguez (MEX) |
| FIP Panamerican Junior Championships – Teams; Aguascalientes, Mexico n/a 17–21 September 2024 | Argentina; 3–0 | Mexico | Argentina; 2–1 | Mexico |
| Premier Padel P2 Oysho Valladolid; Valladolid, Spain €250,000; 17–22 September 2024 | Arturo Coello (ESP); Agustín Tapia (ARG); 6–4, 4–6, 6–3 | Alejandro Galán (ESP); Federico Chingotto (ARG) | Gemma Triay (ESP); Claudia Fernández (ESP); 6–3, 6–2 | Ariana Sánchez (ESP); Paula Josemaría (ESP) |
| FIP Rise Sassuolo; Sassuolo, Italy €12,500; 20–22 September 2024 | Miguel Deus (POR); Nuno Deus (POR); 6–3, ^{4}6–7, 6–4 | Lorenzo di Giovanni (ITA); Riccardo Sinicropi (ITA) | Arantxa Soriano (ESP); Letizia Manquillo (ESP); 6–2, 3–6, 7–6^{5} | Steffie Weterings (NED); Tia Norton (GBR) |
| FIP Promotion Luštica Bay; Tivat, Montenegro €2,500; 20–22 September 2024 | Adrián Rodríguez (ESP); Roberto Belmont (ESP); 6–3, ^{2}6–7, 7–6^{6} | Ricardo Martínez (ESP); Gonzalo Pérez (ESP) | No women's draw | |
| FIP Promotion Ajman; Ajman, United Arab Emirates €5,000; 26–29 September 2024 | Youp de Kroon (NED); Julian Prins (NED); 2–6, 7–6^{3}, 6–2 | Sten Richters (NED); Bram Meijer (NED) | No women's draw | |
| Premier Padel Greenweez Paris Major; Paris, France €1,026,375; 30 Sep.–6 Oct. 2024 | Arturo Coello (ESP); Agustín Tapia (ARG); 6–2, 6–1 | Alejandro Galán (ESP); Federico Chingotto (ARG) | Ariana Sánchez (ESP); Paula Josemaría (ESP); 6–4, 6–0 | Delfina Brea (ARG); Andrea Ustero (ESP) |

=== October ===
| Tournament | Men's winners | Men's runners-up | Women's winners | Women's runners-up |
|---|---|---|---|---|
| FIP Rise Catamarca; San Fernando del Valle de Catamarca, Argentina €6,250; 4–6 October 2024 | Valentino Acosta (ARG); Nicolas Arnó (ARG); 6–3, 6–3 | Julián Leite (ARG); Juan Pablo Dametto (ARG) | No women's draw | |
| FIP Gold Lyon; Lyon, France €50,000; 10–13 October 2024 | Jairo Bautista (ESP); Fran Guerrero (ESP); 4–6, 7–6^{5}, 6–4 | Alex Chozas (ARG); Leandro Augsburger (ARG) | Lorena Rufo (ESP); Beatriz Caldera (ESP); 6–2, 6–3 | Andrea Ustero (ESP); Alejandra Alonso (ESP) |
| FIP Rise Stratford; London, Great Britain €12,500; 11–13 October 2024 | Christian Medina (GBR); Alberto Gª Jiménez (ESP); 6–3, 6–4 | Manuel Aragón (ESP); Roberto Belmont (ESP) | Patricia Martínez (ESP); Águeda Pérez (ESP); 6–0, 6–0 | Lucía García (ESP); Natividad López (ESP) |
| FIP Promotion Poreč–Parenzo; Poreč, Croatia €5,000; 11–13 October 2024 | Simone Cremona (ITA); Jaime Fermosell (ESP); 7–5, 6–3 | Pedro Araújo (POR); Gerard Arnaldos (ESP) | Caterina Baldi (ITA); Giulia Dal Pozzo (ITA); 7–6^{5}, 1–0^{rtd.} | Rosalie van der Hoek (NED); Carla Fernández (ESP) |
| FIP Platinum Marbella; Marbella, Spain €120,000; 15–19 October 2024 | Jairo Bautista (ESP); Fran Guerrero (ESP); 6–4, 7–6^{2} | Momo González (ESP); Edu Alonso (ESP) | Claudia Jensen (ARG); Tamara Icardo (ESP); 6–3, 6–1 | Jessica Castelló (ESP); Alejandra Salazar (ESP) |
| FIP Rise Jeddah; Jeddah, Saudi Arabia €12,500; 17–19 October 2024 | Miguel González (ESP); Thomas Leygue (FRA); 6–4, 7–6 | Clément Geens (BEL); Dylan Guichard (FRA) | Aitana García (ESP); Carla Serrano (ESP); 6–0, 6–4 | María Portillo (ESP); Kaori Peco (ESP) |
| FIP Promotion Dubai; Dubai, United Arab Emirates €5,000; 17–20 October 2024 | Sergio Icardo (UAE); Fran Jurado (UAE); 6–2, 6–2 | Manu Rocafort (ESP); Alexander Khalanskii (ANA) | Karin Hechenberger (SUI); Dóra Andrejszki (HUN); 6–3, 4–6, 7–6 | Silvia López (ESP); Claudia Manzanares (ESP) |
| FIP Rise Santiago de Chile; Santiago, Chile €12,500; 18–20 October 2024 | Juani Rubini (ARG); Manuel Gayone (ARG); 6–4, 6–2 | Christian Medina (GBR); Alberto Gª Jiménez (ESP) | Valeria Zoya (ARG); Daniela Niella (ARG); 7–5, 6–3 | Fiorella Propato (ARG); Francesca Floriani (ARG) |
| FIP Rise Metepec; Metepec, Mexico €12,500; 18–20 October 2024 | Agustín Torre (ARG); Diego Arredondo (MEX); 6–1, 7–6 | Renzo Núñez (ARG); Ivo Núñez (ARG) | Camila Ramme (MEX); Ana María Cabrejas (MEX); 6–4, 6–2 | Natalia Blanco (MEX); Emma Reyes (MEX) |
| FIP Promotion Villena JCFerrero; Villena, Spain €5,000; 18–20 October 2024 | Agustín Reca (GER); Álvaro López (ESP); 5–7, 6–4, 6–1 | Sergio Nieto (ESP); Marc Sintes (ESP) | Nuria Vivancos (ESP); Xènia Clascà (ESP); 6–3, 6–4 | Rosalie van der Hoek (NED); Carla Fernández (ESP) |
| FIP Promotion Sportclub Houten; Houten, Nerherlands €5,000; 18–20 October 2024 | Sten Richters (NED); Bram Meijer (NED); 3–6, 6–2, 6–4 | Michele Bruno (ITA); Simone Iacovino (ITA) | Steffie Weterings (NED); Tia Norton (GBR); 6–3, 6–1 | Maaike Betz (NED); Janine Hemmes (NED) |
| Premier Padel P2 Newgiza; Giza, Egypt €250,000; 21–26 October 2024 | Franco Stupaczuk (ARG); Miguel Yanguas (ESP); 6–3, 7–6^{2} | Javi Garrido (ESP); Lucas Bergamini (BRA) | Marta Ortega (ESP); Sofia Araújo (POR); 6–4, 6–2 | Jessica Castelló (ESP); Alejandra Salazar (ESP) |
| FIP Rise Antalya; Antalya, Turkey €6,250; 24–26 October 2024 | Tonet Sans (ESP); Miguel González (ESP); 6–4, 6–1 | Nico Suescun (ITA); Manu Castaño (ESP) | No women's draw | |
| FIP Rise Fuerteventura; Las Playitas, Spain €12,500; 25–27 October 2024 | Pol Hernández (ESP); Ramiro Valenzuela (ARG); 7–5, 6–4 | Pablo Castillo (ESP); Cándido Alfaro (ESP) | Marta Borrero (ESP); Raquel Eugenio (ESP); 7–5, 7–5 | Marta Caparrós (ESP); Marta Barrera (ESP) |
| FIP Rise Alcalá de Guadaíra; Alcalá de Guadaíra, Spain €12,500; 30 Oct.–1 Nov. 2024 | Gonzalo Rubio (ESP); Pablo Lijó (ESP); 6–3, 3–6, 6–1 | Nacho Vilariño (ESP); Mario del Castillo (ESP) | Patricia Martínez (ESP); Águeda Pérez (ESP); 7–6, 1–0^{rtd.} | Lucía García (ESP); Natividad López (ESP) |
| FIP World Padel Championships; Doha, Qatar €500,000; 28 Oct.–2 Nov. 2024 | Argentina; 2–1 | Spain | Spain; 2–0 | Argentina |
| FIP Star Aguascalientes; Aguascalientes, Mexico €25,000; 31 Oct.–2 Nov. 2024 | Juani Rubini (ARG); Manuel Gayone (ARG); 1–6, 7–6^{0}, 6–4 | Matías Almada (ARG); Juan Manuel Argañaras (ARG) | Arantxa Soriano (ESP); Letizia Manquillo (ESP); 6–3, 7–6^{8} | Ana Varo (ESP); Alba Pérez (ESP) |

=== November ===
| Tournament | Men's winners | Men's runners-up | Women's winners | Women's runners-up |
|---|---|---|---|---|
| FIP Promotion Vic; Vic, Spain €5,000; 1–3 November 2024 | Jaume Romera (ESP); Diego Dorta (ESP)^{6}6–7, 6–2, ^{rtd.} | Rubén Rivera (ESP); Marc Bernils (ESP) | Giulia Dal Pozzo (ITA); Carla Fernández (ESP); 6–3, 4–6, 6–0 | Mª Cristina López (ESP); Blanca Arriola (ESP) |
| FIP Gold Potosí; San Luis Potosí, Mexico €50,000; 6–9 November 2024 | Rodrigo Coello (ESP); Boris Castro (ESP); 2–6, 6–1, 6–1 | Matías Almada (ARG); Juan Manuel Argañaras (ARG) | Arantxa Soriano (ESP); Letizia Manquillo (ESP); 6–1, 7–5 | Nuria Vivancos (ESP); Xènia Clascà (ESP) |
| Premier Padel P1 Dubai; Dubai, United Arab Emirates €470,000; 5–10 November 2024 | Arturo Coello (ESP); Agustín Tapia (ARG); 6–4, 6–3 | Alejandro Galán (ESP); Federico Chingotto (ARG) | Delfina Brea (ARG); Beatriz González (ESP); 6–2, 6–3 | Andrea Ustero (ESP); Alejandra Alonso (ESP) |
| FIP Star Kaunas; Kaunas, Lithuania €12,500; 8–10 November 2024 | Nacho Moragues (ESP); Marc Sintes (ESP); 7–6^{5}, 6–4 | Jaume Romera (ESP); Diego Dorta (ESP) | No women's draw | |
| FIP Rise Kaunas; Kaunas, Lithuania €6,250; 8–10 November 2024 | No men's draw | | Amanda López (ESP); Camila Fassio (ESP); 4–6, 6–3, 6–2 | Teresa Moríñigo (ESP); María Cristina López (ESP) |
| FIP Promotion Almería; Roquetas de Mar, Spain €5,000; 8–10 November 2024 | Curro Cabeza (ESP); Santi Pineda (ESP); 6–2, 6–4 | Borja Trujillo (ESP); Héctor Vázquez (ESP) | Elena de la Rosa (ESP); Ana Sánchez (ESP); 6–4, 6–2 | Gema Flores (ESP); Amelie Détrivière (FRA) |
| FIP Star Beau Plan; Mon Rocher, Mauritius €25,000; 14–16 November 2024 | Nacho Piotto (ARG); Thomas Leygue (FRA); 6–3, 6–0 | Maxime Joris (FRA); Timéo Fonteny (FRA) | Marta Arellano (ESP); Laura Luján (ESP); 6–2, 6–2 | Ana Domínguez (ESP); Carla Touly (FRA) |
| Premier Padel P1 Kuwait City; Kuwait City, Kuwait €470,000; 11–17 November 2024 | Arturo Coello (ESP); Agustín Tapia (ARG); 6–4, 6–2 | Franco Stupaczuk (ARG); Miguel Yanguas (ESP) | Ariana Sánchez (ESP); Paula Josemaría (ESP); 7–5, 7–6^{1} | Gemma Triay (ESP); Claudia Fernández (ESP) |
| FIP Rise Oeiras; Oeiras, Portugal €12,500; 15–17 November 2024 | Nacho Moragues (ESP); Marc Sintes (ESP); 6–3, 6–2 | Simone Cremona (ITA); Marco Cassetta (ITA) | Lucía García (ESP); Daiara Valenzuela (ARG); 7–5, 6–4 | Emily Stellato (ITA); Martina Parmigiani (ITA) |
| FIP Rise Manila; Manila, Philippines €12,500; 15–17 November 2024 | Sergi Nogueras (ESP); Marc Bernils (ESP); 7–5, 7–5 | Samuel Jones (GBR); Julian Prins (NED) | Aimee Gibson (GBR); Victoria Nicholas (GBR) w/o | Rosalie van der Hoek (NED); Carla Fernández (ESP) |
| FIP Rise Viña del Mar II; Viña del Mar, Chile €6,250; 15–17 November 2024 | Juani Rubini (ARG); Teo Gamondi (ITA); 6–4, 4–6, 6–3 | Manuel Gayone (ARG); Axel Guevara (ARG) | No women's draw | |
| FIP Promotion La Nucia; La Nucia, Spain €5,000; 15–17 November 2024 | Sergio Arias (ESP); Aarón García (ESP); 6–3, 6–4 | Roberto Belmont (ESP); Antonio Varo (ESP) | Ana Sánchez (ESP); Natalia Molinilla (ESP); 7–5, 0–6, 6–4 | Lucía Micaela (ESP); Teresa Moríñigo (ESP) |
| FIP Platinum Mexico; Mexico City, Mexico €120,000; 19–23 November 2024 | Álex Ruiz (ESP); Alex Arroyo (ESP); 6–2, 3–6, 6–0 | Javi Garrido (ESP); Lucas Bergamini (BRA) | Lucía Sainz (ESP); Alejandra Alonso (ESP); 6–4, 6–4 | Virginia Riera (ARG); Julieta Bidahorria (ARG) |
| FIP Promotion Doha Qatar I Doha, Qatar €5,000; 20–24 November 2024 | Jairo Guerrero (ESP); Pablo Sánchez (ESP); 6–0, 6–2 | Mohammed Al-Kuwari (QAT); Javi Navarro (ESP) | No women's draw | |
| FIP Promotion India; Delhi, India €5,000; 21–24 November 2024 | Pol Alsina (ESP); Eduard Altimires (ESP); 6–4, 7–5 | Arthur Hugounenq (FRA); Thomas Seux (FRA) | Ainize Santamaría (ESP); Aitana Solán (ESP); 3–6, 6–1, 6–2 | Kotomi Ozawa (JPN); Elisabeth Nogueras (ESP) |
| FIP Rise Open MCV; Naples, Italy €12,500; 22–24 November 2024 | Alejandro Jerez (ESP); Manuel Aragón (ESP); 6–3, 6–3 | Eneko Arija (ESP); Sergio Nieto (ESP) | Giulia Dal Pozzo (ITA); Caterina Baldi (ITA); 6–2, 6–4 | Chiara Pappacena (ITA); Giulia Sussarello (ITA) |
| FIP Rise Betsson Sweden VII; Gothenburg, Sweden €6,250; 22–24 November 2024 | Albin Olsson (SWE); Douglas Rutgersson (SWE); 3–6, 7–5, 6–2 | Linus Frost (SWE); Daniel Appelgren (SWE) | No women's draw | |
| FIP Promotion Houten III; Houten, Nerherlands €5,000; 22–24 November 2024 | Diogo Jesus (POR); Pedro Graça (POR); 6–4, 6–4 | Afonso Fazendeiro (POR); Curro Cabeza (ESP) | Kaori Peco (ESP); Ana Sánchez (ESP); 3–6, 6–3, 6–2 | Sara Foguer (ESP); Liza Groenveld (NED) |
| FIP Rise Padel Arena Fastweb; Perugia, Italy €12,500; 28–30 November 2024 | Nacho Moragues (ESP); Marc Sintes (ESP); 6–3, 7–6^{3} | Curro Cabeza (ESP); Pablo Pastor (ESP) | Emily Stellato (ITA); Martina Parmigiani (ITA); 6–4, 7–6 | Raluca Sandu (MON); Nela Brito (ARG) |
| Premier Padel GNP Mexico Major; Acapulco, Mexico €800,000; 25 Nov.–1 Dec. 2024 | Arturo Coello (ESP); Agustín Tapia (ARG); 4–6, 6–1, 6–2 | Franco Stupaczuk (ARG); Miguel Yanguas (ESP) | Gemma Triay (ESP); Claudia Fernández (ESP)^{5}6–7, 6–1, 6–4 | Marta Ortega (ESP); Sofia Araújo (POR) |
| FIP Rise Doha; Doha, Qatar €12,500; 27 Nov.–1 Dec. 2024 | Youssef Hossam (EGY); Julián Lacamoire (ARG); 6–0, 6–3 | Borja Trujillo (ESP); Joel Fernández (ESP) | Aimee Gibson (GBR); Catherine Rose (GBR); 6–0, 6–3 | Natalia Molinilla (ESP); Ainize Santamaría (ESP) |
| FIP Rise Roeselare; Rumbeke, Belgium €6,250; 29 Nov.–1 Dec. 2024 | Diogo Jesus (POR); Pedro Graça (POR); 7–6^{4}, 3–6, 6–2 | Jérôme Inzerillo (FRA); Adrien Maigret (FRA) | No women's draw | |
| FIP Promotion Castellón La Plana Sports; Castellón de la Plana, Spain €5,000; 29 Nov.–1 Dec. 2024 | Jan Masferrer (ESP); Albert Roglán (ESP); 6–2, 6–4 | Alex Tasa (ESP); Arturo Hernando (ESP) | Kaori Peco (ESP); Ana Sánchez (ESP); 6–0, 3–6, 6–2 | Valeria Atencia (ESP); Eugènia Guimet (ESP) |

=== December ===
| Tournament | Men's winners | Men's runners-up | Women's winners | Women's runners-up |
|---|---|---|---|---|
| Premier Padel P1 Milano; Milan, Italy €470,000; 2–8 December 2024 | Arturo Coello (ESP); Agustín Tapia (ARG); 6–4, 7–5 | Alejandro Galán (ESP); Federico Chingotto (ARG) | Gemma Triay (ESP); Claudia Fernández (ESP)^{5}6–7, 5–2^{rtd.} | Delfina Brea (ARG); Beatriz González (ESP) |
| FIP Rise Abu Dhabi; Abu Dhabi, United Arab Emirates €12,500; 5–8 December 2024 | Sergio Icardo (UAE); Fran Jurado (UAE); 6–4, 6–1 | Alejandro Jerez (ESP); Manuel Aragón (ESP) | Ángela Caro (ESP); Constanza Vega (ARG); 6–4, 7–6^{5} | Gimena Sol (ARG); Silvia López (ESP) |
| FIP Rise Concepción; Concepción, Chile €6,250; 6–8 December 2024 | Pablo Molina (ARG); Cristóbal Martínez (CHL); 7–5, 6–4 | Miguel Melero (ESP); Teo Gamondi (ITA) | No women's draw | |
| Cupra FIP Finals Grand Bourg; Bourg-en-Bresse, France €90,000; 11–15 December 2024 | Jairo Bautista (ESP); Fran Guerrero (ESP); 7–5, 6–1 | Lucas Campagnolo (BRA); Nacho Sager (ESP) | Marina Guinart (ESP); Victoria Iglesias (ESP); 6–4, 5–7, 6–0 | Araceli Martínez (ESP); Alix Collombon (FRA) |
| Premier Padel Finals; Barcelona, Spain €600,000; 19–22 December 2024 | Coki Nieto (ESP); Jon Sanz (ESP); 3–6, 7–5, 6–3 | Arturo Coello (ESP); Agustín Tapia (ARG) | Paula Josemaría (ESP); Ariana Sánchez (ESP); 6–3, 6–3 | Gemma Triay (ESP); Claudia Fernández (ESP) |

== Rankings ==
Men's Individual Ranking as of 2 September 2024
| No. | Player | Points |
|---|---|---|
| 1 | Arturo Coello (ESP) | 13,242 |
| 2 | Agustín Tapia (ARG) | 12,228 |
| 3 | Alejandro Galán (ESP) | 11,995 |
| 4 | Federico Chingotto (ARG) | 9,668 |
| 5 | Juan Lebrón (ESP) | 8,400 |
| 6 | Martín di Nenno (ARG) | 8,132 |
| 7 | Franco Stupaczuk (ARG) | 7,334 |
| 8 | Francisco Navarro (ESP) | 6,585 |
| 9 | Miguel Yanguas (ESP) | 4,070 |
| 10 | Javi Garrido (ESP) | 4,067 |

Women's Individual Ranking as of 2 September 2024
| No. | Player | Points |
|---|---|---|
| 1 | Ariana Sánchez (ESP) | 13,153 |
| = | Paula Josemaría (ESP) | 13,153 |
| 3 | Gemma Triay (ESP) | 9,154 |
| 4 | Delfina Brea (ARG) | 7,809 |
| 5 | Beatriz González (ESP) | 7,488 |
| 6 | Claudia Fernández (ESP) | 6,283 |
| 7 | Marta Ortega (ESP) | 6,057 |
| 8 | Jessica Castelló (ESP) | 4,816 |
| 9 | Lucía Sainz (ESP) | 4,762 |
| 10 | Claudia Jensen (ARG) | 4,552 |

== See also ==
- International Padel Federation
- 2024 in Padel
- es:Premier Padel 2024
