= 2021 Abierto Mexicano Telcel – Singles =

Singles
- 2021 Abierto Mexicano Telcel

Final
- Champion: (Germany) Alexander Zverev
- Runner-up: (Greece) Stefanos Tsitsipas
- Score: 6–4, 7–6^{(7–3)}

Details
- Draw: 32 (4 Q / 3 WC )
- Seeds: 8

Events
Singles	Doubles
- Mexican Open

Alexander Zverev defeated top seed Stefanos Tsitsipas in the final, 6–4, 7–6^{(7–3)} to win the men's singles tennis title at the 2021 Mexican Open.

Rafael Nadal was the defending champion, but chose not to defend his title.

== Seeds ==
1. (Greece) Stefanos Tsitsipas (final)
2. (Germany) Alexander Zverev (champion)
3. (Argentina) Diego Schwartzman (first round)
4. (Canada) Milos Raonic (second round)
5. (Bulgaria) Grigor Dimitrov (quarterfinals)
6. (Italy) Fabio Fognini (second round)
7. (Canada) Félix Auger-Aliassime (quarterfinals)
8. (Norway) Casper Ruud (quarterfinals, withdrew)

== Draw ==
Key

- Q = Qualifier
- WC = Wild card
- LL = Lucky loser
- Alt = Alternate
- ITF = ITF entry
- PR = Protected ranking
- SR = Special ranking
- SE = Special exempt
- JE = Junior exempt
- JR = Junior Accelerator Programme entrant
- CO = College Accelerator Programme entrant
- NG = Next Gen Accelerator Program entrant
- w/o = Walkover
- r = Retired
- d = Defaulted

=== Finals ===
Semifinals
1	(Greece) Stefanos Tsitsipas	6	6
Q	(Italy) Lorenzo Musetti	1	3
(Germany) Dominik Koepfer	4	6^{5}
2	(Germany) Alexander Zverev	6	7^{7}

Final
1	(Greece) Stefanos Tsitsipas	4	6^{3}
2	(Germany) Alexander Zverev	6	7^{7}

=== Top half ===
First round
1	(Greece) S Tsitsipas	6	6
(France) B Paire	3	1
(United States) J Isner	6	6
(Italy) S Caruso	4	3
(Croatia) M Čilić	5	2
WC	(United States) S Korda	7	6
(United States) T Sandgren	3	6^{8}
7	(Canada) F Auger-Aliassime	6	7^{10}
3	(Argentina) D Schwartzman	3	6	4
Q	(Italy) L Musetti	6	2	6
Q	(United States) B Nakashima	4	7^{7}	6^{5}
(United States) F Tiafoe	6	6^{5}	7^{7}
(Serbia) M Kecmanović	6	6
(Spain) F López	4	4
(France) A Mannarino	4	0^{r}
5	(Bulgaria) G Dimitrov	6	3

Second round
1	(Greece) S Tsitsipas	6	6
(United States) J Isner	3	2
WC	(United States) S Korda	3	4
7	(Canada) F Auger-Aliassime	6	6
Q	(Italy) L Musetti	2	6	7^{7}
(United States) F Tiafoe	6	3	6^{1}
(Serbia) M Kecmanović	4	2
5	(Bulgaria) G Dimitrov	6	6

Quarterfinals
1	(Greece) S Tsitsipas	7	4	6
7	(Canada) F Auger-Aliassime	5	6	3
Q	(Italy) L Musetti	6	7^{7}
5	(Bulgaria) G Dimitrov	4	6^{3}

Semifinals
1	(Greece) S Tsitsipas	6	6
Q	(Italy) L Musetti	1	3

=== Bottom half ===
First round
6	(Italy) F Fognini	7	6
(Italy) S Travaglia	5	2
(United Kingdom) C Norrie	6	6
Q	(United States) S Kozlov	3	3
WC	(Mexico) G López Villaseñor	4	2
(Germany) D Koepfer	6	6
(United States) T Paul	6^{6}	4
4	(Canada) M Raonic	7^{8}	6
8	(Norway) C Ruud	6	6
SE	(Colombia) DE Galán	4	1
LL	(United States) D Kudla	6^{4}	6	3
Q	(Netherlands) T Griekspoor	7^{7}	4	6
(United States) S Johnson	2	3
(Serbia) L Đere	6	6
WC	(Spain) C Alcaraz	3	1
2	(Germany) A Zverev	6	6

Second round
6	(Italy) F Fognini	4	3
(United Kingdom) C Norrie	6	6
(Germany) D Koepfer	6	6
4	(Canada) M Raonic	4	2
8	(Norway) C Ruud	4	6	7^{7}
Q	(Netherlands) T Griekspoor	6	3	6^{3}
(Serbia) L Đere	4	3
2	(Germany) A Zverev	6	6

Quarterfinals
(United Kingdom) C Norrie	5	4
(Germany) D Koepfer	7	6
8	(Norway) C Ruud
2	(Germany) A Zverev	w/o

Semifinals
(Germany) D Koepfer	4	6^{5}
2	(Germany) A Zverev	6	7^{7}

== Qualifying ==
=== Seeds ===
1. (Italy) Salvatore Caruso (moved to main draw)
2. (Portugal) João Sousa (second round)
3. (Italy) Lorenzo Musetti (qualified)
4. (United States) Denis Kudla (qualifying competition, lucky loser)
5. (Brazil) Thiago Seyboth Wild (second round)
6. (Bosnia and Herzegovina) Damir Džumhur (second round, defaulted)
7. (Germany) Cedrik-Marcel Stebe (second round)
8. (Switzerland) Henri Laaksonen (first round)

=== Qualifiers ===
1. (United States) Brandon Nakashima
2. (United States) Stefan Kozlov
3. (Italy) Lorenzo Musetti
4. (Netherlands) Tallon Griekspoor

=== Lucky loser ===
1. (United States) Denis Kudla

=== Qualifying draw ===
==== First qualifier ====
First round
Alt	(France) Nicolas Mahut	6	6
(Australia) Luke Saville	3	3
(Italy) Enrico Dalla Valle	1	4
(Italy) Federico Gaio	6	6
WC	(Mexico) Luis Patiño	2	1
(United States) Brandon Nakashima	6	6
(Serbia) Danilo Petrović	3	6	4
5	(Brazil) Thiago Seyboth Wild	6	4	6

Second round
Alt	(France) Nicolas Mahut	3	0^{r}
(Italy) Federico Gaio	6	2
(United States) Brandon Nakashima	6	6
5	(Brazil) Thiago Seyboth Wild	3	3

Qualifying competition
(Italy) Federico Gaio	3	3
(United States) Brandon Nakashima	6	6

==== Second qualifier ====
First round
2	(Portugal) João Sousa	7	5	7
WC	(Germany) Mischa Zverev	5	7	5
Alt	(United States) Jordi Arconada	4	1
(United States) Stefan Kozlov	6	6
(Italy) Alessandro Bega	6^{3}	1
(Netherlands) Botic van de Zandschulp	7^{7}	6
(United States) Collin Altamirano	6	6^{1}	0
6	(Bosnia and Herzegovina) Damir Džumhur	4	7^{7}	6

Second round
2	(Portugal) João Sousa	2	6	3
(United States) Stefan Kozlov	6	2	6
(Netherlands) Botic van de Zandschulp	6
6	(Bosnia and Herzegovina) Damir Džumhur	5^{d}

Qualifying competition
(United States) Stefan Kozlov	6	1
(Netherlands) Botic van de Zandschulp	3	0^{r}

==== Third qualifier ====
First round
3	(Italy) Lorenzo Musetti	3	6	6
WC	(Mexico) Alex Hernández	6	1	0
(Argentina) Guido Iván Justo	0	1
WC	(Argentina) Agustín Velotti	6	6
(Chinese Taipei) Jason Jung	5	2
(Portugal) Frederico Ferreira Silva	7	6
(Italy) Paolo Lorenzi	2	0
7	(Germany) Cedrik-Marcel Stebe	6	6

Second round
3	(Italy) Lorenzo Musetti	6	7
WC	(Argentina) Agustín Velotti	3	5
(Portugal) Frederico Ferreira Silva	6	3	6
7	(Germany) Cedrik-Marcel Stebe	4	6	3

Qualifying competition
3	(Italy) Lorenzo Musetti	6	6
(Portugal) Frederico Ferreira Silva	4	2

==== Fourth qualifier ====
First round
4	(United States) Denis Kudla	6	6
(Australia) John-Patrick Smith	4	4
(Colombia) Alejandro González	2	7^{7}	3
(United States) Raymond Sarmiento	6	6^{3}	0^{r}
(Netherlands) Tallon Griekspoor	7	4	6
(Argentina) Hernán Casanova	5	6	2
(Australia) Thanasi Kokkinakis	6	6
8	(Switzerland) Henri Laaksonen	1	3

Second round
4	(United States) Denis Kudla	6	6
(Colombia) Alejandro González	3	2
(Netherlands) Tallon Griekspoor	6	6^{5}	6
(Australia) Thanasi Kokkinakis	4	7^{7}	3

Qualifying competition
4	(United States) Denis Kudla	3	6^{6}
(Netherlands) Tallon Griekspoor	6	7^{8}
