= ATP 500 tournaments =

Tennis tournament category since 2009

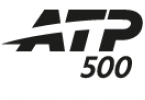
ATP 500 tournaments logo since 2025

The ATP 500 tournaments (previously known as the ATP World Tour 500 tournaments, ATP International Series Gold, and ATP Championship Series) are the fourth-highest tier of annual men's tennis tournaments, after the four Grand Slam tournaments, ATP Finals, and the ATP Masters 1000 events. The winners of each tournament are awarded 500 ranking points—which accounts for the name of the series.

As of 2026, the series includes 16 tournaments, which have draws of 32 for singles and 16 for doubles. Leading players must enter at least four 500 events, including at least one after the US Open; if they play fewer than four, or fail to play in one after the US Open they get a "zero" score towards their world ranking for each one short.

Roger Federer has won the most ATP 500 singles titles (24), while Daniel Nestor has won the most doubles titles (20).

== Historic names ==
- 1990–1999: ATP Championship Series
- 2000–2008: ATP International Series Gold
- 2009–2018: ATP World Tour 500
- 2019–present: ATP 500

== ATP points ==
Event	W	F	SF	QF	R16	R32	Q	Q2	Q1
Men's singles	500	330	200	100	50	(25)	25 (16)	13 (8)	0
Men's doubles	500	300	180	90	0	—N/a	—N/a	—N/a	—N/a

Parenthesis indicate points for 48 player draw.

== Tournaments ==
Current Events
Tournament	City	Venue	Surface	Prize money (2025)	Date
Dallas Open	Frisco	Ford Center at The Star	Hard (i)	$2,760,000	9–15 February
Rotterdam Open	Rotterdam	Rotterdam Ahoy	Hard (i)	€2,134,985	9–15 February
Qatar Open	Doha	Khalifa International Tennis and Squash Complex	Hard	$2,760,000	16–22 February
Rio Open	Rio de Janeiro	Jockey Club Brasileiro	Clay	$2,396,115	16–22 February
Dubai Championships	Dubai	Aviation Club Tennis Centre	Hard	$3,237,670	23–28 February
Mexican Open	Acapulco	Arena GNP Seguros	Hard	$2,585,410	23–28 February
Barcelona Open	Barcelona	Real Club de Tenis Barcelona	Clay	€2,889,200	14–20 April
Bavarian International	Munich	MTTC Iphitos	Clay	€2,500,000	14–20 April
Hamburg Open	Hamburg	Am Rothenbaum	Clay	€2,158,560	18–24 May
Queen's Club Championships	London	Queen's Club	Grass	€2,255,655	16–22 June
Halle Open	Halle	Gerry Weber Stadion	Grass	€2,255,655	16–22 June
Washington Open	Washington, D.C.	William H.G. FitzGerald Tennis Center	Hard	$2,396,115	21–27 July
Japan Open	Tokyo	Ariake Coliseum	Hard	$2,226,470	24–30 September
China Open	Beijing	National Tennis Center	Hard	$4,016,050	25 September–1 October
Vienna Open	Vienna	Wiener Stadthalle	Hard (i)	€2,736,875	20–26 October
Swiss Indoors	Basel	St. Jakobshalle	Hard (i)	€2,523,045	20–26 October

Location map of current ATP 500 events outside of Europe
Location map of current ATP 500 events in Europe

Past Events
Tournament	City	Venue	Surface	Status
Astana Open (2022)	Astana	Daulet National Tennis Centre	Hard (i)	ATP 250
St. Petersburg Open (2020)	Saint Petersburg	Sibur Arena	Hard (i)	N/A (Defunct)
U.S. Indoor Championships (2009–2013)	Memphis, Tennessee	Racquet Club of Memphis	Hard (i)	N/A (Defunct)
Valencia Open (2009–2014)	Valencia	City of Arts and Sciences	Hard (i)	N/A (Defunct)

== Singles champions ==
=== ATP Championship Series ===
Tournament	1990	1991	1992	1993	1994	1995	1996	1997	1998	1999
Brussels	Becker (1/9)	Forget (1/1)	Becker (5/9)	Not an event						
Antwerp	Invitational		ATP World Series			Not an event	Stich (3/3)	Rosset (1/2)	Rusedski (1/3)	Not an event
Toronto Indoor	Lendl (1/6)	Not an event								
Memphis	ATP World Series	Lendl (3/6)	Washington (1/1)	Courier (2/5)	Martin (1/3)	Martin (2/3)	Sampras (7/12)	Chang (4/5)	Philippoussis (1/2)	Haas (1/4)
Rotterdam	ATP World Series									Kafelnikov (4/4)
Milan/London (Note: Milan event leased and held in London in 1998–2000)	ATP World Series			Becker (6/9)	Becker (7/9)	Kafelnikov (1/4)	Ivanišević (5/7)	Ivanišević (6/7)	Kafelnikov (3/4)	Krajicek (5/5)
Philadelphia	Sampras (1/12)	Lendl (4/6)	Sampras (3/12)	Woodforde (1/1)	Chang (1/5)	Enqvist (1/2)	Courier (5/5)	Sampras (10/12)	Sampras (11/12)	Not an event
Stuttgart Indoor	Becker (2/9)	Edberg (2/8)	Ivanišević (2/7)	Stich (2/3)	Edberg (7/8)	Krajicek (3/5)	ATP Super 9			
Tokyo Outdoor	Edberg (1/8)	Edberg (3/8)	Courier (1/5)	Sampras (5/12)	Sampras (6/12)	Courier (4/5)	Sampras (8/12)	Krajicek (4/5)	Pavel (1/1)	Kiefer (1/1)
Barcelona	Gómez (1/1)	E. Sánchez (1/1)	C. Costa (1/1)	A. Medvedev (2/3)	Krajicek (1/5)	Muster (1/4)	Muster (3/4)	A. Costa (1/2)	Martin (3/3)	Mantilla (1/1)
Stuttgart Outdoor	Ivanišević (1/7)	Stich (1/3)	A. Medvedev (1/3)	Gustafsson (1/2)	Berasategui (1/1)	Muster (2/4)	Muster (4/4)	Corretja (1/5)	Kuerten (1/4)	Norman (1/1)
Kitzbühel	ATP World Series									A. Costa (2/2)
Washington, D.C.	Agassi (1/6)	Agassi (2/6)	Korda (2/2)	Mansdorf (1/1)	Edberg (8/8)	Agassi (3/6)	Chang (3/5)	Chang (5/5)	Agassi (5/6)	Agassi (6/6)
Indianapolis	Becker (3/9)	Sampras (2/12)	Sampras (4/12)	Courier (3/5)	Ferreira (1/1)	Enqvist (2/2)	Sampras (9/12)	Björkman (1/1)	Corretja (2/5)	Lapentti (1/2)
New Haven	Rostagno (1/1)	Korda (1/2)	Edberg (6/8)	A. Medvedev (3/3)	Becker (8/9)	Agassi (4/6)	O'Brien (1/1)	Kafelnikov (2/4)	Kučera (1/1)	Not an event
Sydney Indoor	Becker (4/9)	Edberg (4/8)	Ivanišević (3/7)	Yzaga (1/1)	Krajicek (2/5)	Not an event				
Tokyo Indoor	Lendl (2/6)	Edberg (5/8)	Lendl (5/6)	Lendl (6/6)	Ivanišević (4/7)	Chang (2/5)	Not an event			
Singapore	ATP World Series			Not an event			ATP World Series	Gustafsson (2/2)	Ríos (1/2)	Ríos (2/2)
Vienna	ATP World Series						Becker (9/9)	Ivanišević (7/7)	Sampras (12/12)	Rusedski (2/3)

=== ATP International Series Gold ===
Tournament	2000	2001	2002	2003	2004	2005	2006	2007	2008
Rotterdam	Pioline (1/1)	Escudé (1/2)	Escudé (2/2)	Mirnyi (1/1)	Hewitt (2/2)	Federer (5/24)	Štěpánek (1/2)	Youzhny (1/2)	Llodra (1/1)
Memphis	Larsson (1/1)	Philippoussis (2/2)	Roddick (2/5)	Dent (1/1)	J. Johansson (1/1)	Carlsen (2/2)	Haas (3/4)	Haas (4/4)	Darcis (1/1)
London	Rosset (2/2)	ATP International Series (Milan)					Not an event		
Dubai	ATP International Series	Ferrero (1/2)	Santoro (1/1)	Federer (2/24)	Federer (4/24)	Federer (6/24)	Nadal (4/23)	Federer (8/24)	Roddick (3/5)
Mexico City/Acapulco	Chela (1/2)	Kuerten (3/4)	Moyá (1/3)	Calleri (1/2)	Moyá (3/3)	Nadal (1/23)	Horna	Chela (2/2)	Almagro (1/2)
Barcelona	Safin (1/1)	Ferrero (2/2)	Gaudio (1/2)	Moyá (2/3)	Robredo (1/1)	Nadal (2/23)	Nadal (5/23)	Nadal (6/23)	Nadal (8/23)
Stuttgart	Squillari (1/1)	Kuerten (4/4)	ATP International Series	Coria (1/2)	Cañas (1/1)	Nadal (3/23)	Ferrer (1/10)	Nadal (7/23)	del Potro (1/9)
Kitzbühel	Corretja (3/5)	Lapentti (2/2)	Corretja (5/5)	Coria (2/2)	Massú (1/1)	Gaudio (2/2)	Calleri (2/2)	Mónaco (1/2)	del Potro (2/9)
Washington, D.C.	Corretja (4/2)	Roddick (1/5)	Blake (1/1)	ATP International Series					
Indianapolis	Kuerten (2/4)	Rafter (1/1)	Rusedski (3/3)	ATP International Series					
Tokyo	Schalken (1/1)	Hewitt (1/2)	Carlsen (1/2)	Schüttler (1/1)	Novák (1/1)	Moodie (1/1)	Federer (7/24)	Ferrer (2/10)	Berdych (1/3)
Vienna	Henman (1/1)	Haas (2/4)	Federer (1/24)	Federer (3/24)	López (1/3)	Ljubičić (1/2)	Ljubičić (2/2)	Djokovic (1/16)	Petzschner (1/1)

=== ATP World Tour 500 ===
Tournament	2009	2010	2011	2012	2013	2014	2015	2016	2017	2018
Rotterdam	Murray (1/9)	Söderling (1/2)	Söderling (2/2)	Federer (11/24)	del Potro (5/9)	Berdych (3/3)	Wawrinka (1/3)	Kližan (1/2)	Tsonga (2/2)	Federer (20/24)
Memphis	Roddick (4/5)	Querrey (1/2)	Roddick (5/5)	Melzer (1/1)	Nishikori (2/6)	ATP World Tour 250				
Rio de Janeiro	Not an event					Nadal (15/23)	Ferrer (8/10)	Cuevas (1/1)	Thiem (2/5)	Schwartzman (1/1)
Acapulco	Almagro (2/2)	Ferrer (3/10)	Ferrer (5/10)	Ferrer (6/10)	Nadal (13/23)	Dimitrov (1/1)	Ferrer (9/10)	Thiem (1/5)	Querrey (2/2)	del Potro (9/9)
Dubai	Djokovic (2/16)	Djokovic (5/16)	Djokovic (7/16)	Federer (12/24)	Djokovic (9/16)	Federer (13/24)	Federer (15/24)	Wawrinka (3/3)	Murray (9/9)	Bautista Agut (1/1)
Barcelona	Nadal (9/23)	Verdasco (1/1)	Nadal (11/23)	Nadal (12/23)	Nadal (14/23)	Nishikori (3/6)	Nishikori (5/6)	Nadal (17/23)	Nadal (18/23)	Nadal (20/23)
Halle	ATP World Tour 250						Federer (16/24)	F. Mayer (1/1)	Federer (18/24)	Ćorić (1/1)
London	ATP World Tour 250						Murray (5/9)	Murray (6/9)	López (2/3)	Čilić (2/2)
Hamburg	Davydenko (1/1)	Golubev (1/1)	Simon (1/1)	Mónaco (2/2)	Fognini (1/1)	L. Mayer (1/2)	Nadal (16/23)	Kližan (2/2)	L. Mayer (2/2)	Basilashvili (1/3)
Washington, D.C.	del Potro (3/9)	Nalbandian (1/1)	Štěpánek (2/2)	Dolgopolov (1/1)	del Potro (6/9)	Raonic (1/1)	Nishikori (6/6)	Monfils (1/3)	Zverev (1/6)	Zverev (2/6)
Beijing	Djokovic (3/16)	Djokovic (6/16)	Berdych (2/3)	Djokovic (8/16)	Djokovic (10/16)	Djokovic (11/16)	Djokovic (12/16)	Murray (7/9)	Nadal (19/23)	Basilashvili (2/3)
Tokyo	Tsonga (1/2)	Nadal (10/23)	Murray (3/9)	Nishikori (1/6)	del Potro (7/9)	Nishikori (4/6)	Wawrinka (2/3)	Kyrgios (1/4)	Goffin (1/1)	D. Medvedev (1/5)
Vienna	ATP World Tour 250						Ferrer (10/10)	Murray (8/9)	Pouille (1/1)	Anderson (1/1)
Basel	Djokovic (4/16)	Federer (9/24)	Federer (10/24)	del Potro (4/9)	del Potro (8/9)	Federer (14/24)	Federer (17/24)	Čilić (1/2)	Federer (19/24)	Federer (21/24)
Valencia	Murray (2/9)	Ferrer (4/10)	Granollers (1/1)	Ferrer (7/10)	Youzhny (2/2)	Murray (4/9)	ATP World Tour 250	Not an event		

=== ATP 500 ===
Tournament	2019	2020	2021	2022	2023	2024	2025	2026	2027
Rotterdam	Monfils (2/3)	Monfils (3/3)	Rublev (4/6)	Auger-Aliassime (1/3)	(Note: Competed under no flag due to the Russian invasion of Ukraine.) D. Medvedev (3/5)	Sinner (4/7)	Alcaraz (6/11)	de Minaur (4/4)	
Dallas	Not an event			ATP Tour 250			Shapovalov (1/1)	Shelton (2/3)	
Doha	ATP Tour 250						Rublev (6/6)	Alcaraz (9/11)	
Rio de Janeiro	Djere (1/1)	Garín (1/1)	Cancelled	Alcaraz (1/11)	Norrie (1/1)	Báez (1/2)	Báez (2/2)	Etcheverry (1/1)	
Acapulco	Kyrgios (2/4)	Nadal (21/23)	Zverev (3/6)	Nadal (23/23)	de Minaur (1/4)	de Minaur (2/4)	Macháč (1/1)	Cobolli (2/2)	
Dubai	Federer (22/24)	Djokovic (14/16)	Karatsev (1/1)	Rublev (5/6)	D. Medvedev (4/5)	Humbert (2/2)	Tsitsipas (1/1)	D. Medvedev (5/5)	
Barcelona	Thiem (3/5)	Cancelled due to the COVID-19 pandemic	Nadal (22/23)	Alcaraz (2/11)	Alcaraz (3/11)	Ruud (1/1)	Rune (1/1)	Fils (3/3)	
Munich	ATP Tour 250	Cancelled due to the COVID-19 pandemic	ATP Tour 250				Zverev (6/6)	Shelton (3/3)	
Halle	Federer (23/24)	Cancelled due to the COVID-19 pandemic	Humbert (1/2)	Hurkacz (1/1)	Bublik (1/2)	Sinner (5/7)	Bublik (2/2)	Tiafoe (1/1)	
London	López (3/3)	Cancelled due to the COVID-19 pandemic	Berrettini (1/2)	Berrettini (2/2)	Alcaraz (4/11)	Paul (1/1)	Alcaraz (7/11)	Cerúndolo (1/1)	
Hamburg	Basilashvili (3/3)	Rublev (1/6)	Carreño Busta (1/1)	Musetti (1/1)	Zverev (5/6)	Fils (1/3)	Cobolli (1/2)	Buse (1/1)	
Washington, D.C.	Kyrgios (3/4)	Cancelled	Sinner (1/7)	Kyrgios (4/4)	Evans (1/1)	Korda (1/1)	de Minaur (3/4)	Fritz (2/2)	
St. Petersburg	ATP Tour 250	Rublev (2/6)	ATP Tour 250	Not an event					
Beijing	Thiem (4/5)	Cancelled		Cancelled	Sinner (2/7)	Alcaraz (5/11)	Sinner (6/7)	Djokovic (16/16)	
Tokyo	Djokovic (13/16)	Cancelled		Fritz (1/2)	Shelton (1/3)	Fils (2/3)	Alcaraz (8/11)	Alcaraz (10/11)	
Astana	Not an event	ATP Tour 250		Djokovic (15/16)	ATP Tour 250				
Vienna	Thiem (5/5)	Rublev (3/6)	Zverev (4/6)	D. Medvedev (2/5)	Sinner (3/7)	Draper (1/1)	Sinner (7/7)	Alcaraz (11/11)	
Basel	Federer (24/24)	Cancelled		Auger-Aliassime (2/3)	Auger-Aliassime (3/3)	Mpetshi Perricard (1/1)	Fonseca (1/1)	Vacherot (1/1)	

== Doubles champions ==
=== ATP Championship Series ===
Tournament	1990	1991	1992	1993	1994	1995	1996	1997	1998	1999
Brussels	E. Sánchez (1/3); Živojinović (1/1)	Woodbridge (1/12); Woodforde (1/11)	Becker (1/2); J. McEnroe (1/1)	Not an event						
Antwerp	Invitational		ATP World Series			Not an event	Björkman (1/2); Kulti (1/2)	Adams (2/5); Delaître (2/3)	W. Ferreira (1/1); Kafelnikov (3/6)	Not an event
Toronto Indoor	Galbraith (1/8); Macpherson (1/3)	Not an event								
Memphis	ATP World Series	Riglewski (1/1); Stich (1/1)	Woodbridge (3/12); Woodforde (2/11)	Woodbridge (6/12); Woodforde (5/11)	Black (2/3); Stark (2/4)	Palmer (2/6); Reneberg (6/7)	Knowles (3/15); Nestor (2/20)	E. Ferreira (1/2); Galbraith (7/8)	Woodbridge (10/12); Woodforde (9/11)	Woodbridge (12/12); Woodforde (11/11)
Rotterdam	ATP World Series									Adams (3/5) de Jager (1/3)
Milan/London	ATP World Series			Kratzmann (2/3); Masur (4/5)	Nijssen (3/3); Suk (4/7)	Becker (2/2); Forget (3/3)	Gaudenzi (1/1); Ivanišević (1/1)	Albano (1/2); Nyborg (1/2)	Damm (2/9); Grabb (7/7)	Henman (1/1); Rusedski (1/1)
Philadelphia	Leach (1/8); Pugh (1/2)	Leach (2/8); Pugh (2/2)	Woodbridge (4/12); Woodforde (3/11)	Grabb (4/7); Reneberg (4/7)	Eltingh (1/5); Haarhuis (1/7)	Grabb (5/7); Stark (3/4)	Woodbridge (8/12); Woodforde (7/11)	Lareau (1/4); O'Brien (1/2)	Eltingh (4/5); Haarhuis (4/7)	Not an event
Stuttgart Indoor	Forget (1/3); Hlasek (1/2)	Casal (1/1); E. Sánchez (2/3)	Nijssen (1/3); Suk (1/7)	Kratzmann (3/3); Masur (5/5)	Adams (1/5); Olhovskiy (1/1)	Connell (6/8); Galbraith (6/8)	ATP Super 9			
Tokyo Outdoor	Kratzmann (1/3); Masur (1/5)	Edberg; Woodbridge (2/12)	Jones (1/2); Leach (3/8)	Flach (2/2); Leach (5/8)	Holm (1/1); Järryd (1/1)	Knowles (1/15); Stark (4/4)	Woodbridge (9/12); Woodforde (8/11)	Damm (1/9); Vacek (3/6)	Lareau (2/4); Nestor (3/20)	Tarango (2/2); Vacek (5/6)
Barcelona	Gómez (1/2); J. Sánchez (1/3)	de la Peña (1/1); Nargiso (1/1)	Gómez (2/2); J. Sánchez (2/3)	Cannon (1/1); Melville (2/4)	Kafelnikov (1/6); Rikl (1/4)	Kronemann (1/1); Macpherson (2/3)	Lobo (1/2); J. Sánchez (3/3)	Berasategui (1/1); Burillo (1/1)	Eltingh (5/5); Haarhuis (5/7)	Haarhuis (6/7); Kafelnikov (5/6)
Stuttgart Outdoor	Aldrich (1/1); Visser (1/1)	Masur (2/5); E. Sánchez (3/3)	Layendecker (1/1); Talbot (1/2)	Nijssen (2/3); Suk (2/7)	Melville (3/4); Norval (1/1)	Carbonell (1/1); Roig (1/1)	Pimek (1/1); Talbot (2/2)	Kuerten (1/2); Meligeni (1/1)	Delaître (3/3); Santoro (1/3)	Oncins (1/1); Orsanic (1/1)
Kitzbühel	ATP World Series									Haggard (1/3); Nyborg (2/2)
Washington, D.C.	Connell (1/8); Michibata (1/1)	Davis (2/4); Pate (2/2)	Garnett (1/1); Palmer (1/6)	Black (1/3); Leach (6/8)	Connell (3/8); Galbraith (3/8)	Delaître (1/3); Tarango (1/2)	Connell (7/8); Davis (4/4)	L. Jensen (1/1); M. Jensen (1/1)	Stafford (1/1); Ullyett (1/4)	Gimelstob (1/3); Lareau (3/4)
Indianapolis	Davis (1/4); Pate (1/2)	Flach (1/1); Seguso (1/1)	Grabb (3/7); Reneberg (3/7)	Davis (3/4); Martin (1/1)	Woodbridge (7/12); Woodforde (6/11)	Knowles (2/15); Nestor (1/20)	Grabb (6/7); Reneberg (7/7)	Tillström (1/2); Tebbutt (1/1)	Novák (1/3); Rikl (2/4)	Haarhuis (7/7); Palmer (3/6)
New Haven	Brown (1/1); Melville (1/4)	Korda (1/1); Masur (3/5)	Jones (2/2); Leach (4/8)	Suk (3/7); Vacek (1/6)	Connell (4/8); Galbraith (4/8)	Leach (7/8); Melville (4/4)	Black (3/3); Connell (8/8)	Bhupathi (1/8); Paes (1/6)	Arthurs (1/2); Tramacchi (1/1)	Not an event
Sydney Indoor	Dyke (1/1); Lundgren (1/1)	Grabb (1/7); Reneberg (1/7)	P. McEnroe (1/2); Stark (1/4)	P. McEnroe (2/2); Reneberg (5/7)	Eltingh (2/5); Haarhuis (2/7)	Not an event				
Tokyo Indoor	Forget (2/3); Hlasek (1/2)	Grabb (2/7); Reneberg (2/7)	Woodbridge (5/12); Woodforde (4/11)	Connell (2/8); Galbraith (2/8)	Connell (5/8); Galbraith (5/8)	Eltingh (3/5); Haarhuis (3/7)	Not an event			
Singapore	ATP World Series			Not an event			ATP World Series	Bhupathi (2/8); Paes (2/6)	Woodbridge (11/12); Woodforde (10/11)	Mirnyi (1/7); Taino (1/1)
Vienna	ATP World Series						Kafelnikov (2/6); Vacek (2/6)	E. Ferreira (1/2); Galbraith (8/8)	Kafelnikov (4/6); Vacek (4/6)	Prinosil (1/2); Stolle (1/4)

=== ATP International Series Gold ===
Tournament	2000	2001	2002	2003	2004	2005	2006	2007	2008
Rotterdam	Adams (4/5) de Jager (2/3)	Björkman (2/2); Federer (1/3)	Federer (2/3); Mirnyi (2/7)	Arthurs (2/2); Hanley (1/6)	Hanley (2/6); Štěpánek (2/4)	Erlich (1/1); Ram (1/2)	Hanley (3/6); Ullyett (3/4)	Paes (6/6); Damm (8/9)	Berdych (1/1); Tursunov (1/2)
Memphis	Gimelstob (2/3); Lareau (4/4)	B. Bryan (1/14); M. Bryan (1/14)	MacPhie (2/2); Zimonjić (2/17)	Knowles (7/15); Nestor (6/20)	B. Bryan (4/14); M. Bryan (4/14)	Aspelin (1/3); Perry (1/1)	Haggard (3/3); Karlović (1/1)	Butorac (1/2); J. Murray (1/9)	Bhupathi (5/8); Knowles (12/15)
London	Adams (5/5) de Jager (3/3)	ATP International Series (Milan)					Not an event		
Dubai	ATP International Series	Eagle (1/2); Stolle (3/4)	Knowles (5/15); Nestor (4/20)	Paes (4/6); Rikl (4/4)	Bhupathi (4/8); Santoro (2/3)	Damm (7/9); Štěpánek (4/4)	Hanley (4/6); Ullyett (4/4)	Santoro (3/3); Zimonjić (4/17)	Bhupathi (6/8); Knowles (13/15)
Mexico City/Acapulco	B. Black (4/4); Johnson (1/3)	Johnson (2/3); Kuerten (2/2)	B. Bryan (2/14); M. Bryan (2/14)	Knowles (8/15); Nestor (7/20)	B. Bryan (5/14); M. Bryan (5/14)	Ferrer (1/1); Ventura (1/1)	Čermák (2/5); Friedl (3/4)	Starace (1/2); Vassallo Argüello (1/1)	Marach (1/4); Mertiňák (1/3)
Barcelona	Kulti (2/2); Tillström (2/2)	Johnson (3/3); Palmer (5/6)	Hill (1/1); Vacek (6/6)	B. Bryan (3/14); M. Bryan (3/14)	Knowles (9/15); Nestor (8/20)	Paes (5/6); Zimonjić (3/17)	Knowles (11/15); Nestor (10/20)	Pavel (2/2); Waske (1/1)	B. Bryan (6/14); M. Bryan (6/14)
Stuttgart	Novák (2/3); Rikl (3/4)	Cañas (1/1); Schüttler (1/1)	ATP International Series	Cibulec (1/1); Vízner (1/3)	Novák (3/3); Štěpánek (3/4)	Acasuso (1/1); Prieto (1/1)	Gaudio (1/1); Mirnyi (3/7)	Čermák (3/5); Friedl (4/4)	Kas (1/1); Kohlschreiber (2/2)
Kitzbühel	Albano (2/2); Suk (5/7)	Corretja (1/1); Lobo (2/2)	Koenig (1/1); Shimada (1/1)	Damm (5/9); Suk (6/7)	Čermák (1/5); Friedl (1/4)	Friedl (2/4); Pavel (1/2)	Koubek (1/1); Kohlschreiber (1/2)	Horna (1/1); Starace (2/2)	Cerretani (1/1); Hănescu (1/2)
Washington, D.C.	O'Brien (2/2); Palmer (4/6)	Damm (3/9); Prinosil (2/2)	W. Black (1/1); Ullyett (2/4)	ATP International Series					
Indianapolis	Hewitt (1/1); Stolle (2/4)	Knowles (4/15); MacPhie (1/2)	Knowles (6/15); Nestor (5/20)	ATP International Series					
Tokyo	Bhupathi (3/8); Paes (3/6)	Leach (8/8); Macpherson (3/3)	Coetzee (1/1); Haggard (2/3)	Gimelstob (3/3); Kiefer (1/1)	Palmer (6/6); Vízner (2/3)	Iwabuchi (1/1); Suzuki (1/1)	Fisher (1/1); Phillips (1/1)	Kerr (1/1); Lindstedt (1/3)	Youzhny (1/2); Zverev (1/2)
Vienna	Kafelnikov (6/6); Zimonjić (1/17)	Damm (4/9); Štěpánek (1/4)	Eagle (2/2); Stolle (4/4)	Allegro (1/1); Federer (3/3)	Damm (6/9); Suk (7/7)	Knowles (10/15); Nestor (9/20)	Pála (1/1); Vízner (3/3)	Fyrstenberg (1/3); Matkowski (1/4)	Mirnyi (4/7); Ram (2/2)

=== ATP World Tour 500 ===
Tournament	2009	2010	2011	2012	2013	2014	2015	2016	2017	2018
Rotterdam	Nestor (11/20); Zimonjić (5/17)	Nestor (14/20); Zimonjić (8/17)	Melzer (2/4); Petzschner (1/1)	Llodra (4/6); Zimonjić (13/17)	Lindstedt (3/3); Zimonjić (15/17)	Llodra (6/6); Mahut (1/8)	Rojer (5/8); Tecău (6/10)	Mahut (3/8); Pospisil (3/3)	Dodig (2/9); Granollers (3/7)	Herbert (4/6); Mahut (5/8)
Memphis	Fish (1/2); Knowles (14/15)	Isner (1/1); Querrey (1/1)	Mirnyi (5/8); Nestor (16/20)	Mirnyi (6/8); Nestor (17/20)	B. Bryan (12/14); M. Bryan (12/14)	ATP World Tour 250				
Rio de Janeiro	Not an event					Cabal (1/6); Farah (1/6)	Kližan (1/1); Oswald (1/1)	Cabal (2/6); Farah (2/6)	Carreño Busta (2/2); Cuevas (1/2)	Marrero (5/5); Verdasco (3/3)
Acapulco	Čermák (4/5); Mertiňák (2/3)	Kubot (1/9); Marach (2/4)	Hănescu (2/2); Tecău (1/10)	Marrero (2/5); Verdasco (1/3)	Kubot (2/9); Marrero (4/5)	Anderson (1/1); Ebden (1/1)	Dodig (1/9); Melo (1/14)	Huey (3/3); Mirnyi (8/8)	J. Murray (5/9); Soares (6/9)	J. Murray (7/9); Soares (8/9)
Dubai	de Voest (1/1); Tursunov (2/2)	Aspelin (3/3); Hanley (6/6)	Stakhovsky (1/1); Youzhny (2/2)	Bhupathi (7/87); Bopanna (1/5)	Bhupathi (8/8); Llodra (5/6)	Bopanna (3/5); Qureshi (1/2)	Bopanna (4/5); Nestor (19/20)	Bolelli (1/8); Seppi (1/1)	Rojer (6/8); Tecău (7/10)	Rojer (7/8); Tecău (8/10)
Barcelona	Nestor (12/20); Zimonjić (6/17)	Nestor (15/20); Zimonjić (9/17)	González (1/2); Lipsky (1/1)	Fyrstenberg (2/3); Matkowski (2/4)	Peya (4/6); Soares (3/9)	Huta Galung (1/1); Robert (1/1)	Draganja (2/2); Kontinen (1/6)	B. Bryan (14/14); M. Bryan (14/14)	Mergea (2/2); Qureshi (2/2)	F. López (1/3); M. López (2/2)
Halle	ATP World Tour 250						Klaasen (1/6); R. Ram (1/5)	Klaasen (3/6); R. Ram (2/5)	Kubot (5/9); Melo (5/14)	Kubot (6/9); Melo (6/14)
London	ATP World Tour 250						Herbert (2/6); Mahut (2/8)	Herbert (3/6); Mahut (4/8)	J. Murray (6/9); Soares (7/9)	Kontinen (5/6); Peers (5/9)
Hamburg	Aspelin (2/3); Hanley (5/6)	M. López (1/2); Marrero (1/5)	Marach (3/4); Peya (1/6)	Marrero (3/5); Verdasco (2/3)	Fyrstenberg (3/3); Matkowski (3/4)	Draganja (1/2); Mergea (1/2)	J. Murray (4/9); Peers (1/9)	Kontinen (2/6); Peers (2/9)	Dodig (3/9); Pavic (1/5)	Peralta (1/1); Zeballos (1/4)
Washington, D.C.	Damm (9/9); Lindstedt (2/3)	Fish (2/2); Knowles (15/15)	Llodra (1/6); Zimonjić (10/17)	Huey (1/3); Inglot (1/3)	Benneteau (1/1); Zimonjić (16/17)	Rojer (2/8); Tecău (3/10)	B. Bryan (13/14); M. Bryan (13/14)	Nestor (20/20); Roger-Vasselin (2/6)	Kontinen (3/6); Peers (3/9)	J. Murray (8/9); Soares (9/9)
Beijing	B. Bryan (7/14); M. Bryan (7/14)	B. Bryan (8/14); M. Bryan (8/14)	Llodra (2/6); Zimonjić (11/17)	B. Bryan (11/14); M. Bryan (11/14)	Mirnyi (7/8); Tecău (2/10)	Rojer (3/8); Tecău (4/10)	Pospisil (2/3); Sock (1/3)	Carreño Busta (1/2); Nadal (1/1)	Kontinen (4/6); Peers (4/9)	Kubot (7/9); Melo (7/14)
Tokyo	Knowle (1/1); Melzer (1/4)	Butorac (2/2); Rojer (1/8)	A. Murray (2/3); J. Murray (3/9)	Peya (2/6); Soares (1/9)	Bopanna (2/5); Roger-Vasselin (1/6)	Herbert (1/6); Przysiężny (1/1)	Klaasen (2/6); Melo (2/14)	Granollers (1/7); Matkowski (4/4)	McLachlan (1/3); Uchiyama (1/1)	McLachlan (2/3); Struff (1/2)
Vienna	ATP World Tour 250						Kubot (3/9); Melo (3/14)	Kubot (4/9); Melo (4/14)	Bopanna (5/5); Cuevas (2/2)	Salisbury (1/4); N. Skupski (1/3)
Basel	Nestor (13/20); Zimonjić (7/17)	B. Bryan (9/14); M. Bryan (9/14)	Llodra (3/6); Zimonjić (12/17)	Nestor (18/20); Zimonjić (14/17)	Huey (2/3); Inglot (2/3)	Pospisil (1/3); Zimonjić (17/17)	Peya (6/6); Soares (5/9)	Granollers (2/7); Sock (2/3)	Dodig (4/9); Granollers (4/7)	Inglot (3/3); Škugor (1/1)
Valencia	Čermák (5/5); Mertiňák (3/3)	A. Murray (1/3); J. Murray (2/9)	B. Bryan (10/14); M. Bryan (10/14)	Peya (3/6); Soares (2/9)	Peya (5/6); Soares (4/9)	Rojer (4/8); Tecău (5/10)	ATP World Tour 250	Not an event		

=== ATP 500 tournaments ===
Tournament	2019	2020	2021	2022	2023	2024	2025	2026	2027
Rotterdam	Chardy (1/1); Kontinen (5/6)	Herbert (5/6); Mahut (7/8)	Mektić (1/5); Pavić (2/5)	Haase (1/1); Middelkoop (1/1)	Dodig (7/9); Krajicek (2/5)	Koolhof (1/1); Mektić (4/5)	Bolelli (5/8); Vavassori (3/6)	Bolelli (8/8); Vavassori (6/6)	
Dallas	Not an event			ATP Tour 250			Harrison (1/2); King (1/2)	Arribagé (1/3); Olivetti (1/3)	
Doha	ATP Tour 250						Cash (2/7); Glasspool (3/8)	Heliövaara (3/4); Patten (2/3)	
Rio de Janeiro	M. González (1/5); Jarry (1/1)	Granollers (5/7); Zeballos (2/4)	Cancelled	Bolelli (2/8); Fognini (1/1)	M. González (2/5); Molteni (1/4)	Barrientos (1/1); Matos (1/2)	Matos (2/2); Melo (12/14)	Fonseca (1/1); Melo (13/14)	
Acapulco	A. Zverev (1/2); M. Zverev (2/2)	Kubot (8/9); Melo (8/14)	K. Skupski (1/1); N. Skupski (2/3)	F. López (3/3); Tsitsipas (1/1)	Erler (2/3); Miedler (2/4)	Nys (1/2); Zieliński (1/1)	Harrison (2/2); King (2/2)	Melo (14/14); A. Zverev (2/2)	
Dubai	R. Ram (3/5); Salisbury (2/4)	Peers (6/9); Venus (3/7)	Cabal (4/6); Farah (4/6)	Pütz (2/6); Venus (6/7)	Cressy (1/1); Martin (1/1)	Griekspoor (1/1); Struff (2/2)	Bhambri (1/1); Popyrin (1/1)	Heliövaara (4/4); Patten (3/3)	
Barcelona	Cabal (3/6); Farah (3/6)	Cancelled due to the COVID-19 pandemic	Cabal (5/6); Farah (5/6)	Krawietz (2/6); Mies (1/1)	M. González (3/5); Molteni (2/4)	M. González (5/5); Molteni (4/4)	Arends (1/1); Johnson (1/1)	Cash (5/7); Glasspool (6/8)	
Munich	ATP Tour 250	Cancelled due to the COVID-19 pandemic	ATP Tour 250				Göransson (1/1); Verbeek (1/1)	Schnaitter (1/1); Wallner (1/1)	
Halle	Klaasen (4/6); Venus (1/7)	Cancelled due to the COVID-19 pandemic	Krawietz (1/6); Tecău (10/10)	Granollers (6/7); Zeballos (3/4)	Melo (11/14); Peers (8/9)	Bolelli (3/8); Vavassori (1/6)	Krawietz (5/6); Pütz (5/6)	Arribagé (2/3); Olivetti (2/3)	
London	F. López (2/3); A. Murray (3/3)	Cancelled due to the COVID-19 pandemic	Herbert (6/6); Mahut (8/8)	Mektić (2/5); Pavić (3/4)	Dodig (8/9); Krajicek (3/5)	N. Skupski (3/3); Venus (7/7)	Cash (3/7); Glasspool (4/8)	Arévalo (1/1); Pavić (5/5)	
Hamburg	Marach (4/4); Melzer (3/4)	Peers (7/9); Venus (4/7)	Pütz (1/6); Venus (5/7)	Glasspool (1/8); Heliövaara (1/4)	Krawietz (3/6); Pütz (3/6)	Krawietz (4/6); Pütz (4/6)	Bolelli (6/8); Vavassori (4/6)	Krawietz (6/6); Pütz (6/6)	
Washington, D.C.	Klaasen (5/6); Venus (2/7)	Cancelled	Klaasen (6/6); McLachlan (3/3)	Kyrgios (1/3); Sock (3/3)	M. González (4/5); Molteni (3/4)	Lammons (1/1); Withrow (1/1)	Bolelli (7/8); Vavassori (5/6)	Cash (6/7); Glasspool (7/8)	
St. Petersburg	ATP Tour 250	Melzer (4/4); Roger-Vasselin (4/6)	ATP Tour 250	Not an event					
Beijing	Dodig (5/9); Polášek (1/1)	Cancelled		Not an event	Dodig (9/9); Krajicek (4/5)	Bolelli (4/8); Vavassori (2/6)	Heliövaara (2/4); Patten (1/3)	Cash (7/7); Glasspool (8/8)	
Tokyo	Mahut (6/8); Roger-Vasselin (3/6)	Cancelled		McDonald (1/1); Melo (10/14)	Hijikata (1/1); Purcell (1/1)	Cash (1/7); Glasspool (2/8)	Nys (2/2); Roger-Vasselin (6/6)	Krajicek (5/5); Mektić (5/5)	
Astana	Not an event	ATP Tour 250		Mektić (3/5); Pavić (4/5)	ATP Tour 250				
Vienna	R. Ram (4/5); Salisbury (3/4)	Kubot (9/9); Melo (9/14)	Cabal (6/6); Farah (6/6)	Erler (1/3); Miedler (1/4)	R. Ram (5/5); Salisbury (4/4)	Erler (3/3); Miedler (3/4)	Cash (4/7); Glasspool (5/8)	Miedler (4/4); Oberleitner (1/4)	
Basel	Rojer (8/8); Tecău (9/10)	Cancelled		Dodig (6/9); Krajicek (1/5)	S. González (2/2); Roger-Vasselin (5/6)	J. Murray (9/9); Peers (9/9)	Granollers (7/7); Zeballos (4/4)	Arribagé (3/3); Olivetti (3/3)	

== Statistics ==
Active players indicated in bold.

=== Most titles ===
Titles	Singles player
24	Roger Federer
23	Rafael Nadal
16	**Novak Djokovic**
12	Pete Sampras
11	**Carlos Alcaraz**
10	David Ferrer
9	Boris Becker
9	Juan Martín del Potro
9	Andy Murray
8	Stefan Edberg
7	/ Goran Ivanišević
7	**Jannik Sinner**

Titles	Doubles player
20	Daniel Nestor
17	Nenad Zimonjić
15	Mark Knowles
14	Bob Bryan
14	Mike Bryan
14	**Marcelo Melo**
12	Todd Woodbridge
11	Mark Woodforde
10	Horia Tecău
9	Martin Damm
9	Łukasz Kubot
9	Bruno Soares
9	Ivan Dodig
9	Jamie Murray
9	**John Peers**

== See also ==
- Grand Slam (tennis)
- ATP Finals
- ATP Tour Masters 1000
- ATP Tour 250
- WTA 500
