= 2022 ATP Finals =

- Date: 13–20 November
- Edition: 53rd (singles) / 48th (doubles)
- Category: ATP Finals
- Draw: 8S/8D
- Prize money: $14,750,000
- Surface: Hard (indoor)
- Location: Turin, Italy
- Venue: Pala Alpitour

Champions

Singles
- (Serbia) Novak Djokovic

Doubles
- (United States) Rajeev Ram / (United Kingdom) Joe Salisbury
← 2021 ·	ATP Finals	· 2023 →

The 2022 ATP Finals (also known as the 2022 Nitto ATP Finals for Nitto sponsorship) was a men's tennis year-end tournament played on indoor hard courts at the Pala Alpitour in Turin, Italy, from 13 to 20 November 2022. It was the season-ending event for the highest-ranked singles players and doubles teams on the 2022 ATP Tour.

This was the 53rd edition of the tournament (48th in doubles), and the second time Turin hosted the ATP Tour year-end championships.

== Champions ==
=== Singles ===
- (Serbia) Novak Djokovic def. (Norway) Casper Ruud, 7–5, 6–3

=== Doubles ===
- (United States) Rajeev Ram / (United Kingdom) Joe Salisbury def. (Croatia) Nikola Mektić / (Croatia) Mate Pavić, 7–6^{(7–4)}, 6–4

== Points and prize money ==
The ATP Finals currently (2022) rewards the following points and prize money, per victory:

Stage	Singles	Doubles (Note: Prize money for doubles is per team.)	Points
Final win	$2,200,400	$350,400	500
Semi-final win	$1,070,000	$130,000	400
Round robin win per match	$383,300	$93,300	200
Participation fee	3 matches = $320,000; 2 matches = $240,000; 1 match = $160,000	3 matches = $130,000; 2 matches = $97,500; 1 match = $52,000	—
Alternates	$150,000	$50,000	—

- An undefeated champion would earn the maximum 1,500 points, and $4,740,300 in singles or $930,300 in doubles.

== Format ==
The ATP Finals group stage has a round-robin format, with eight players/teams divided into two groups of four and each player/team in a group playing the other three in the group. The eight seeds were determined by the Pepperstone ATP rankings and ATP Doubles Team Rankings on the Monday after the last ATP Tour tournament of the calendar year. All singles matches, including the final, were best of three sets with tie-breaks in each set including the third. All doubles matches were two sets (no ad) and a Match Tie-break.

In deciding placement within a group, the following criteria were used, in order:

1. Most wins.
2. Most matches played (e.g., a 2–1 record beats a 2–0 record).
3. Head-to-head result between tied players/teams.
4. Highest percentage of sets won.
5. Highest percentage of games won.
6. ATP rank after the last ATP Tour tournament of the year.

Criteria 4–6 were used only in the event of a three-way tie; if one of these criteria decided a winner or loser among the three, the remaining two would have been ranked by head-to-head result.

The top two of each group advanced to semifinals, with the winner of each group playing the runner-up of the other group. The winners of the semifinals then played for the title.

== Qualification ==
=== Singles ===
Eight players compete at the tournament, with two named alternates. Players receive places in the following order of precedence:

1. First, the top 7 players in the ATP Race to Turin on the Monday after the final tournament of the ATP Tour. In 2022, the final tournament was Paris Masters.
2. Second, up to two 2022 Grand Slam tournament winners ranked anywhere 8th–20th, in ranking order
3. Third, the eighth ranked player in the ATP rankings

In the event of this totaling more than 8 players, those lower down in the selection order become the alternates. If further alternates are needed, these players are selected by the ATP.

Provisional rankings are published weekly as the ATP Race to Turin, coinciding with the 52-week rolling ATP rankings on the date of selection. Points are accumulated in Grand Slam, ATP Tour, ATP Cup, ATP Challenger Tour and ITF Tour tournaments. Players accrue points across 19 tournaments, usually made up of:

- The 4 Grand Slam tournaments
- The 8 mandatory ATP Masters 1000 tournaments
- The best results from any 7 other tournaments that carry ranking points (ATP Cup, Monte-Carlo Masters, ATP 500, ATP 250, Challenger, ITF)

=== Doubles ===
Eight teams compete at the tournament, with one named alternate. The eight competing teams receive places according to the same order of precedence as in singles. The named alternate will be offered first to any unaccepted teams in the selection order, then to the highest ranked unaccepted team, and then to a team selected by the ATP. Points are accumulated in the same competitions as for the singles tournament. However, for Doubles teams there are no commitment tournaments, so teams are ranked according to their 19 highest points scoring results from any tournaments on the ATP Tour.

== Qualified players ==
=== Singles ===
#	Players	Points	Date qualified
inj.	(Spain) Carlos Alcaraz	6,820	8 September
1	(Spain) Rafael Nadal	5,820	2 September
2	(Greece) Stefanos Tsitsipas	5,350	30 September
3	(Norway) Casper Ruud	5,020	29 September
4	Daniil Medvedev	4,065	29 October
5	(Canada) Félix Auger-Aliassime	3,995	2 November
6	Andrey Rublev	3,530	2 November
7	(Serbia) Novak Djokovic	3,320	9 October
8	(United States) Taylor Fritz	2,955	5 November

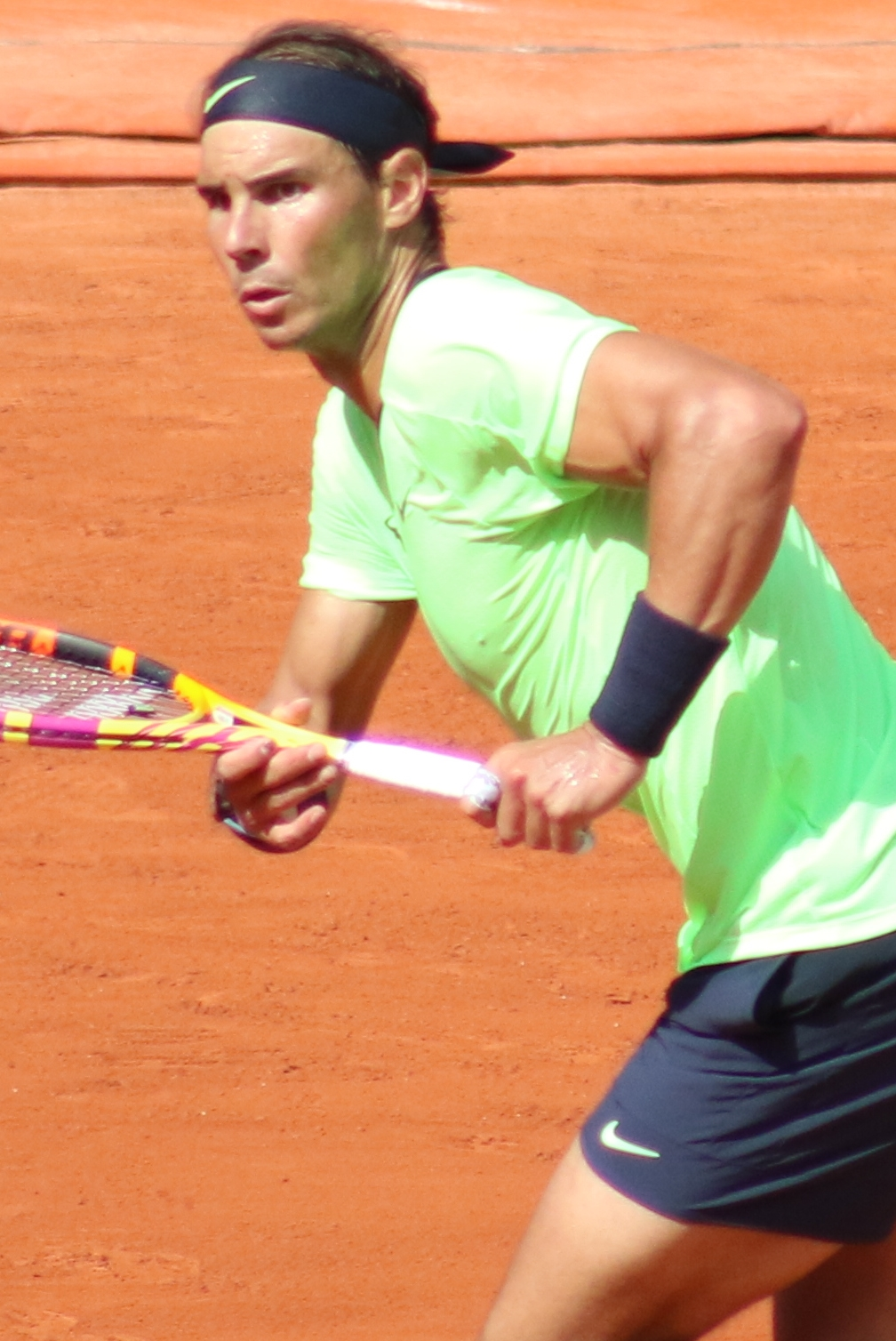
Nadal

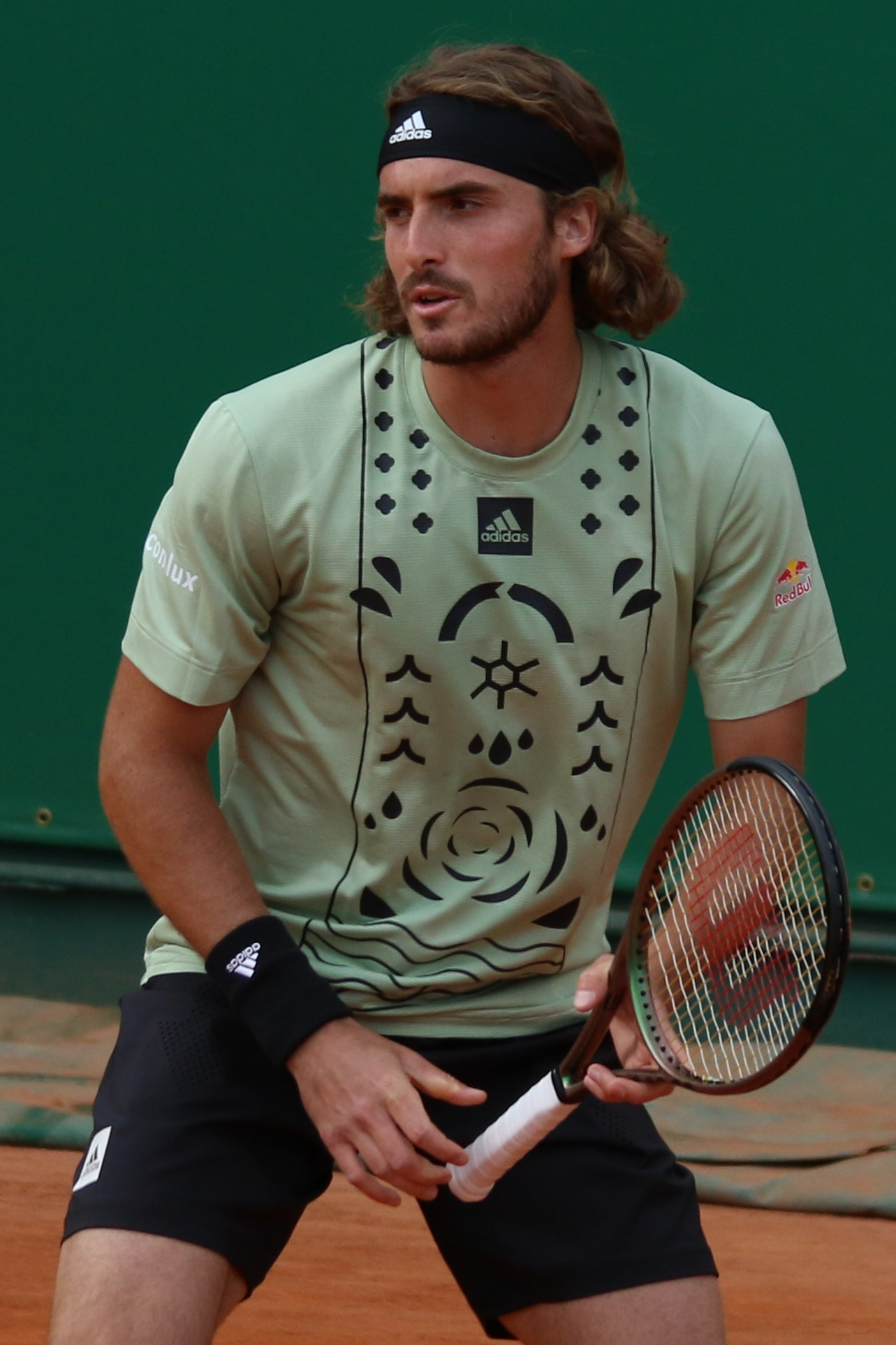
Tsitsipas

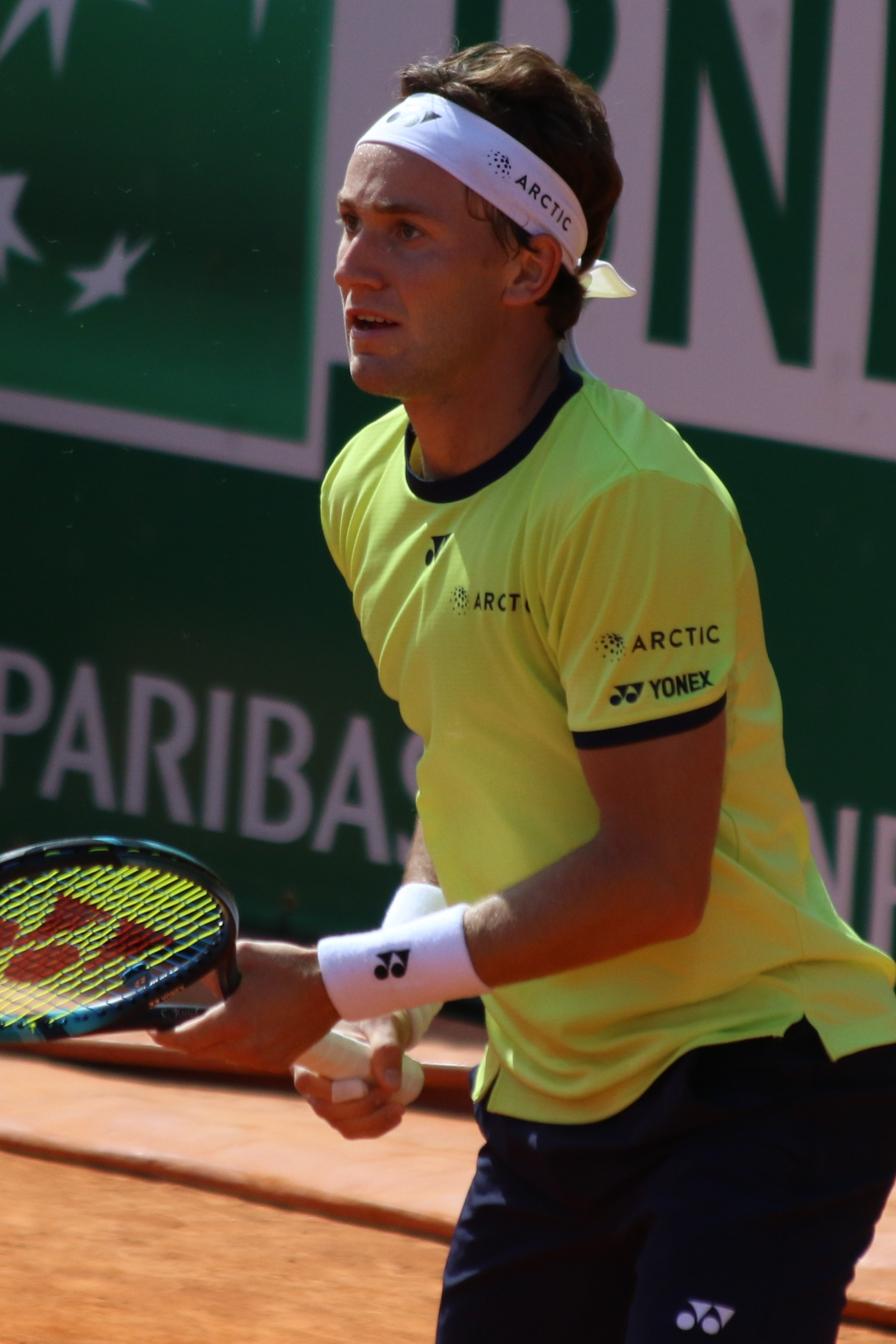
Ruud

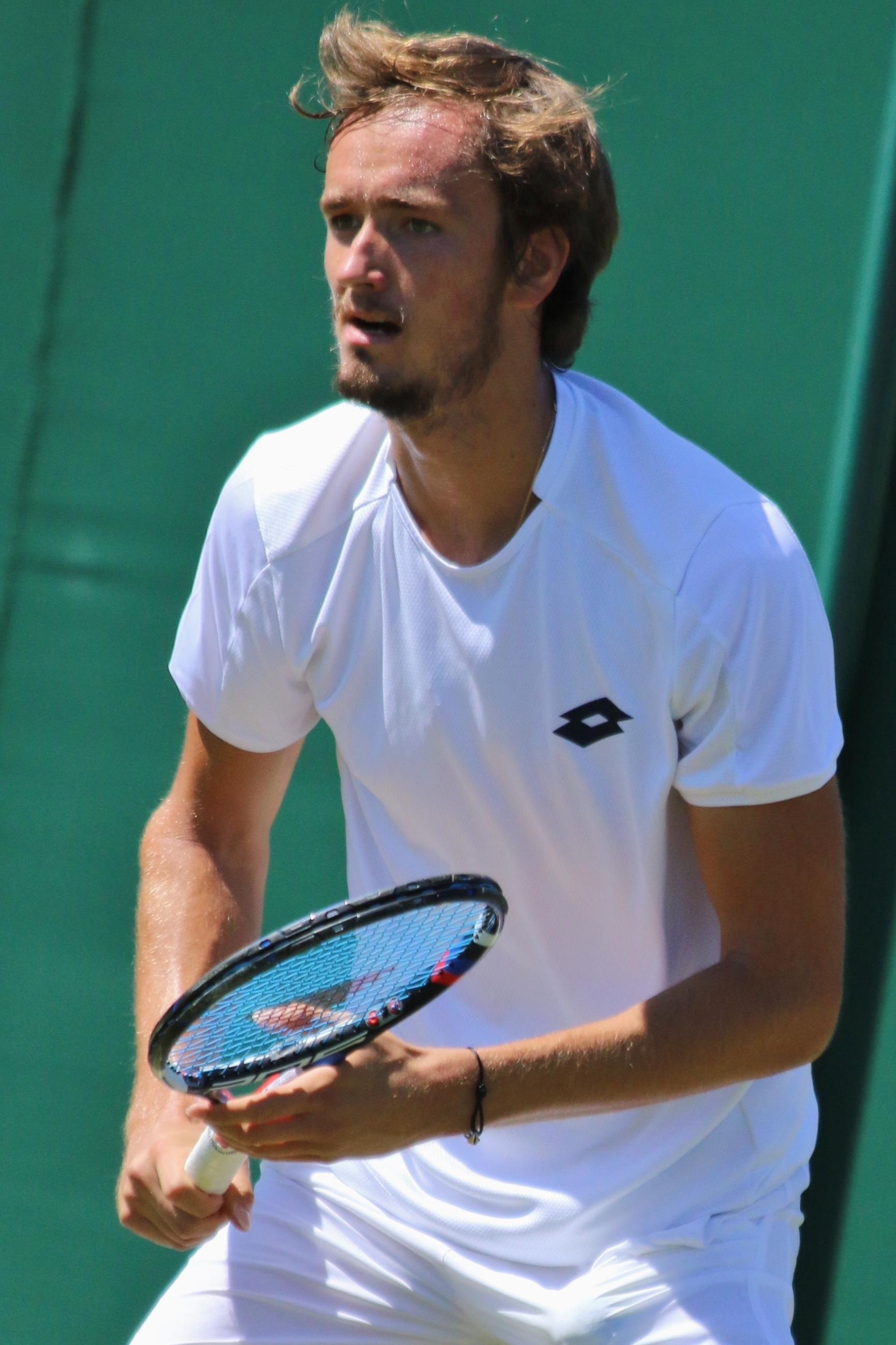
Medvedev

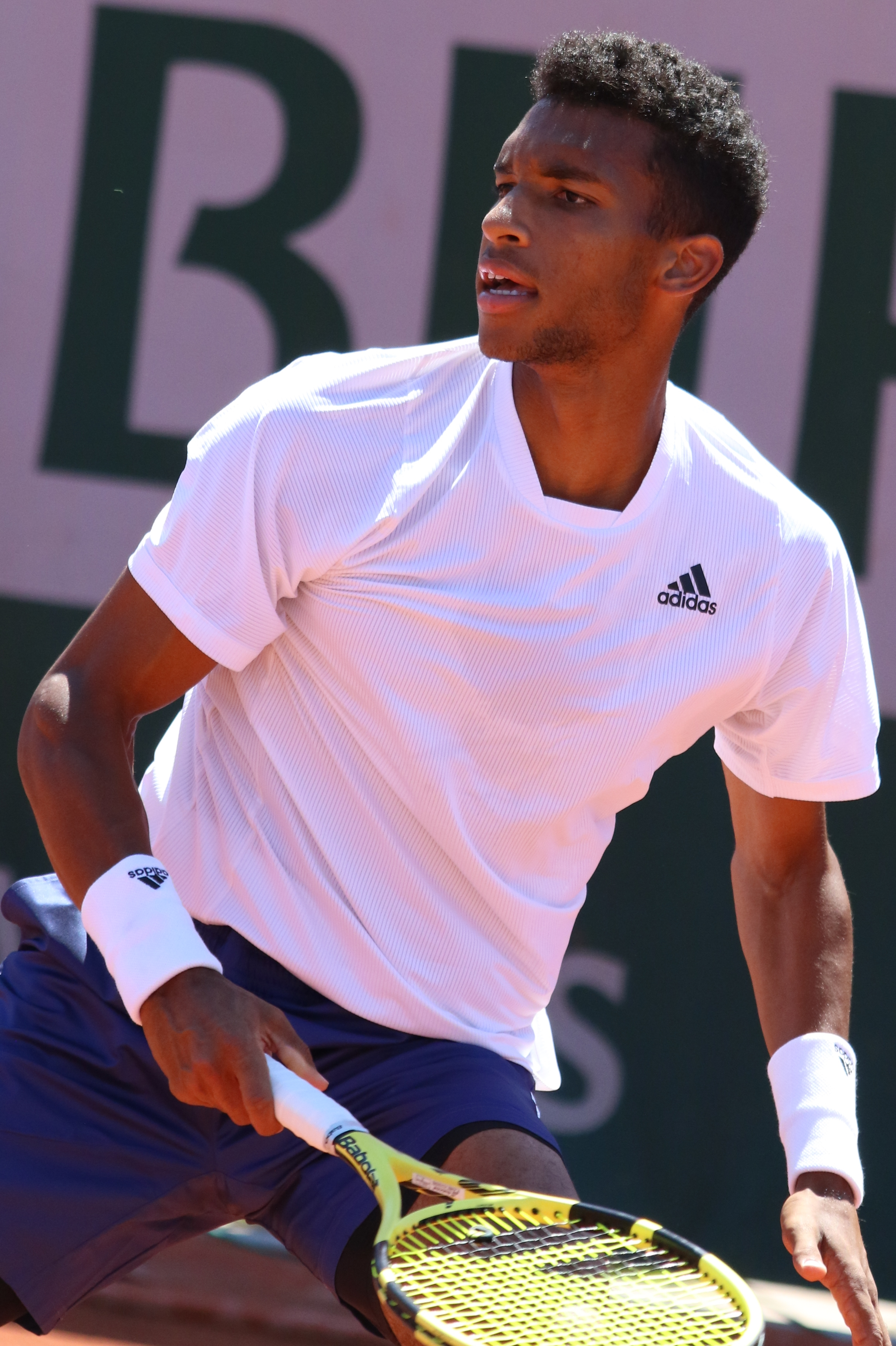
Auger-Aliassime

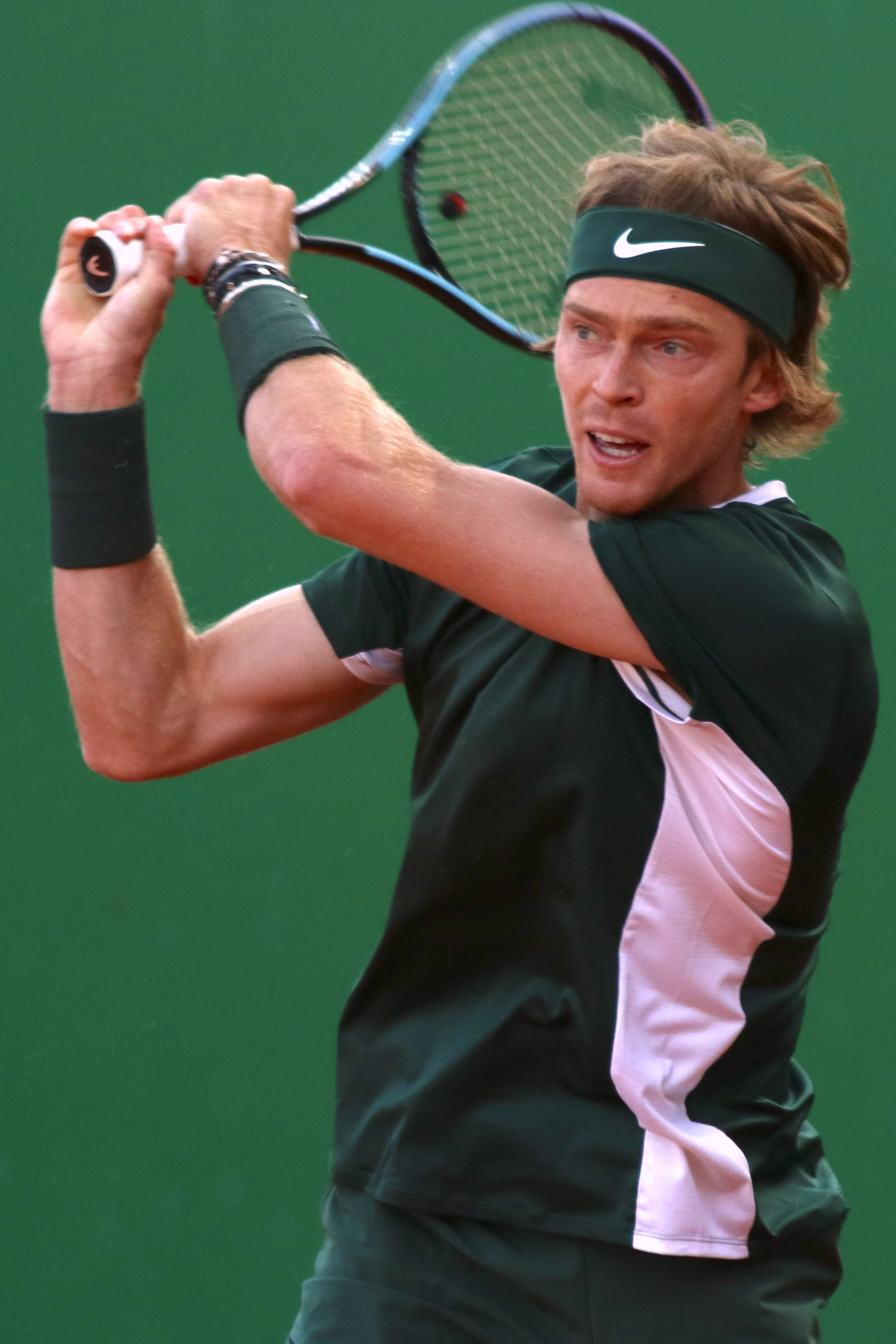
Rublev

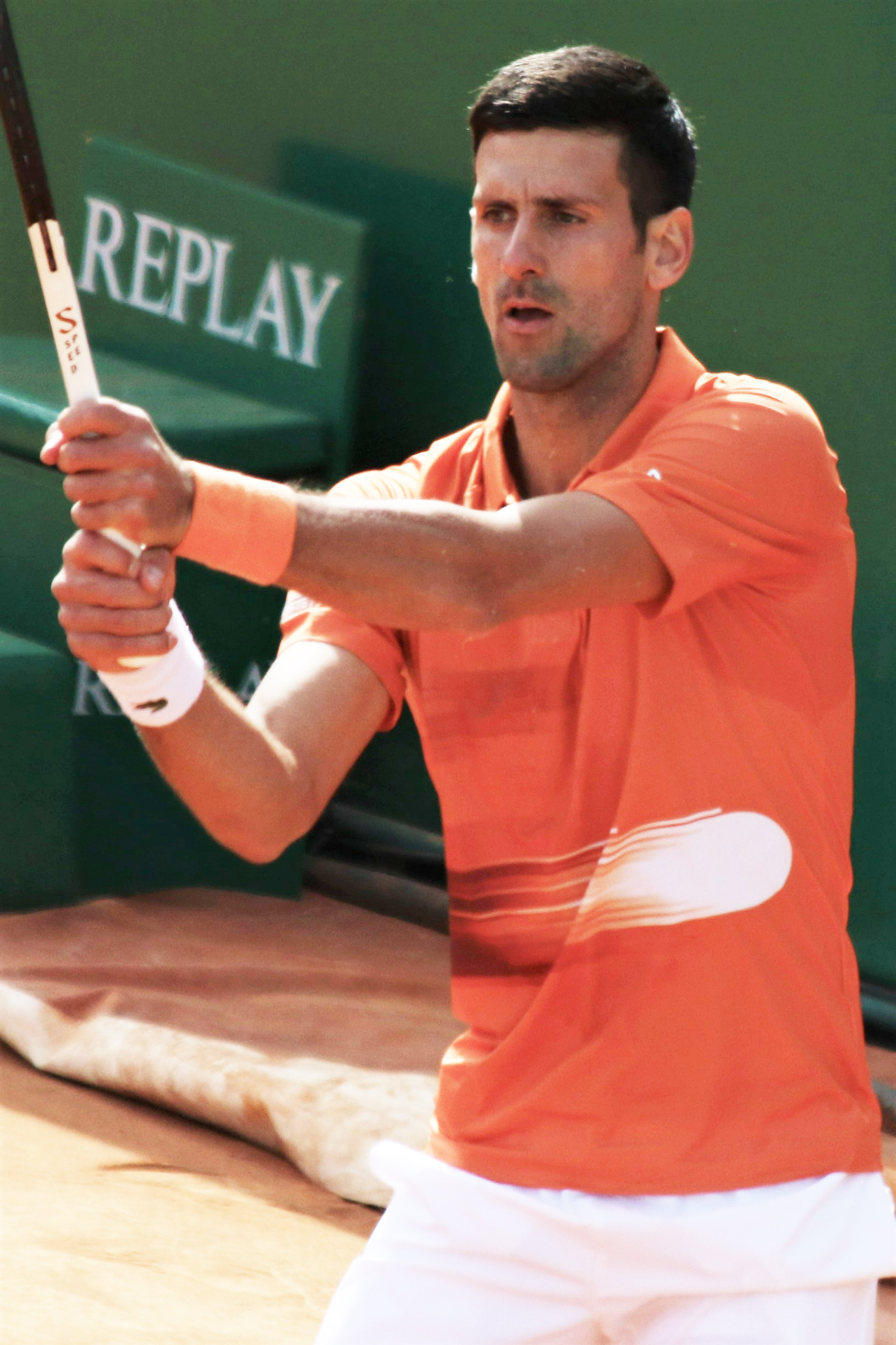
Djokovic

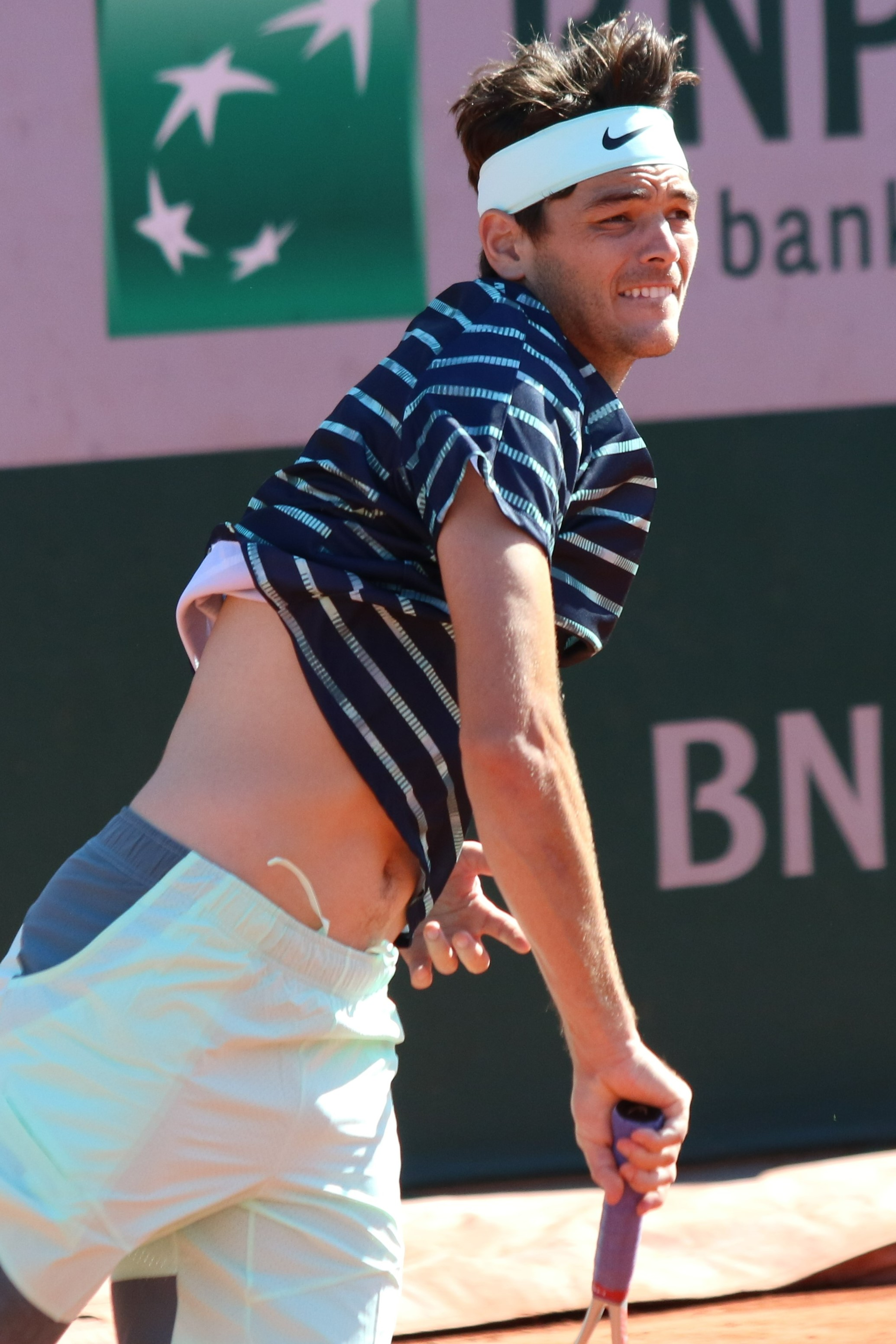
Fritz

=== Doubles ===
#	Players	Points	Date qualified
1	(Netherlands) Wesley Koolhof (United Kingdom) Neal Skupski	7,450	1 September
2	(United States) Rajeev Ram (United Kingdom) Joe Salisbury	5,890	9 September
3	(El Salvador) Marcelo Arévalo (Netherlands) Jean-Julien Rojer	5,255	30 September
4	(Croatia) Nikola Mektić (Croatia) Mate Pavić	4,165	17 October
5	(Croatia) Ivan Dodig (United States) Austin Krajicek	3,700	5 November
6	(United Kingdom) Lloyd Glasspool (Finland) Harri Heliövaara	3,600	4 November
7	(Spain) Marcel Granollers (Argentina) Horacio Zeballos	3,560	3 November
8	(Australia) Thanasi Kokkinakis (Australia) Nick Kyrgios	3,150	31 October

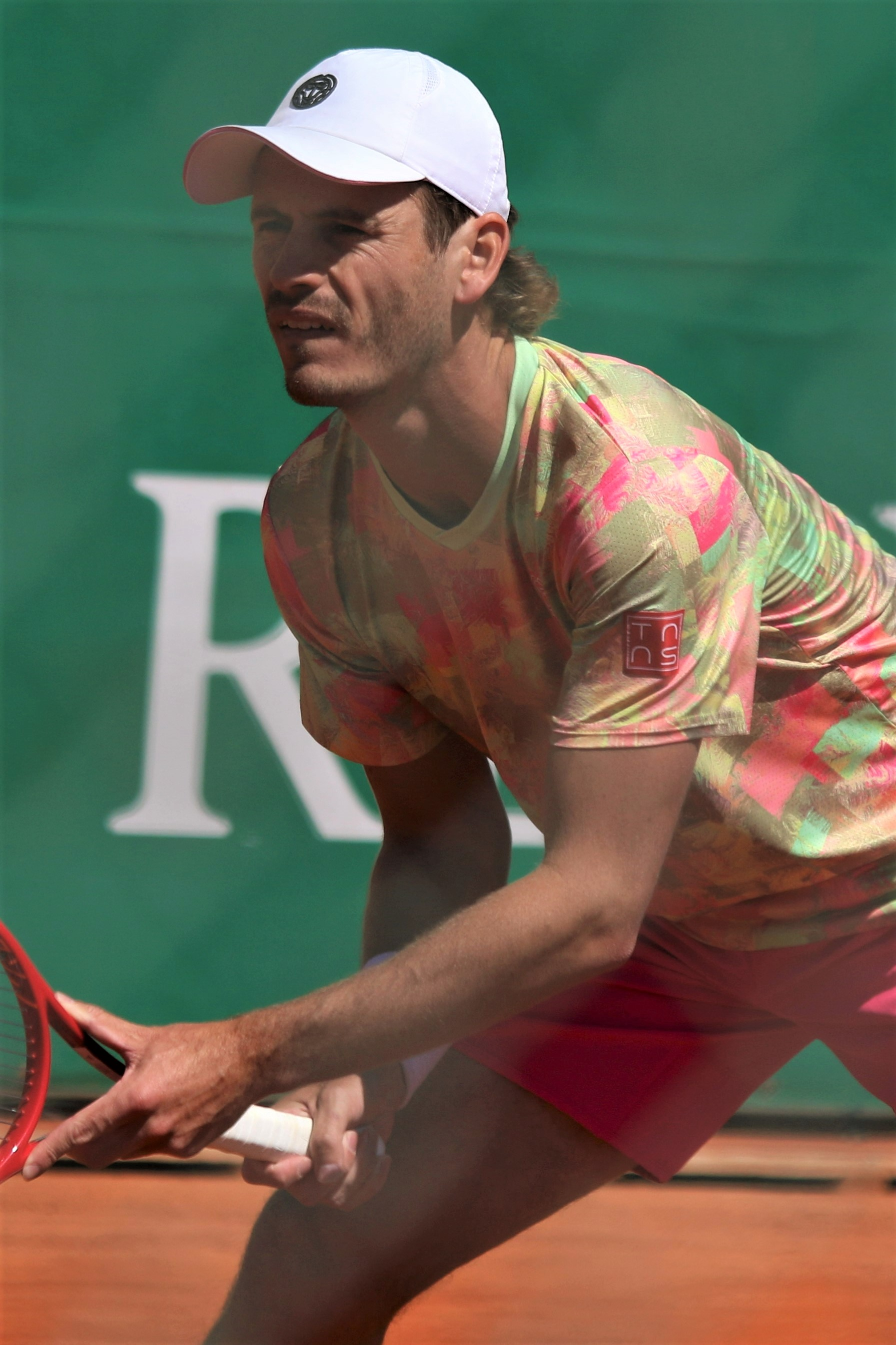
Koolhof

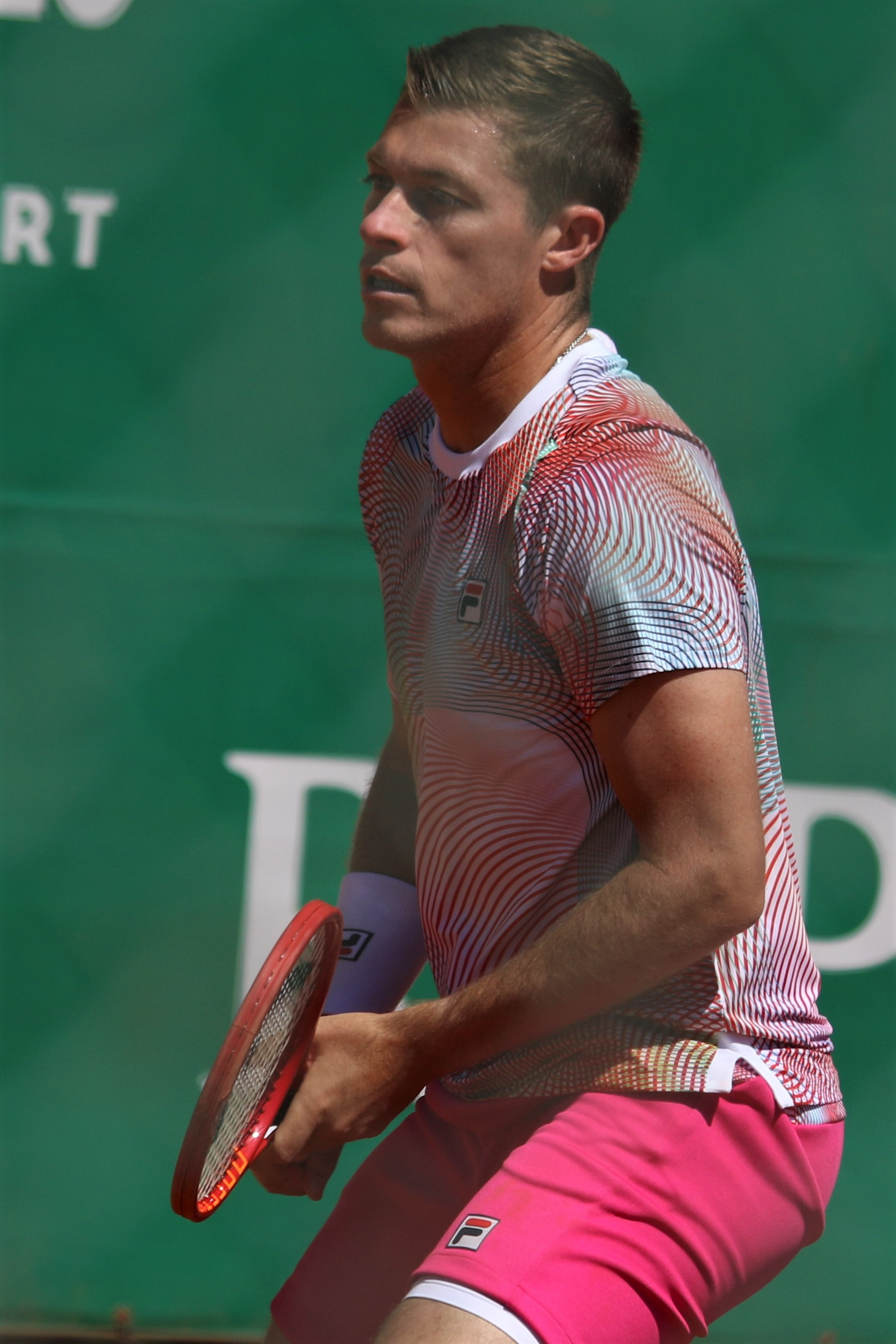
Skupski

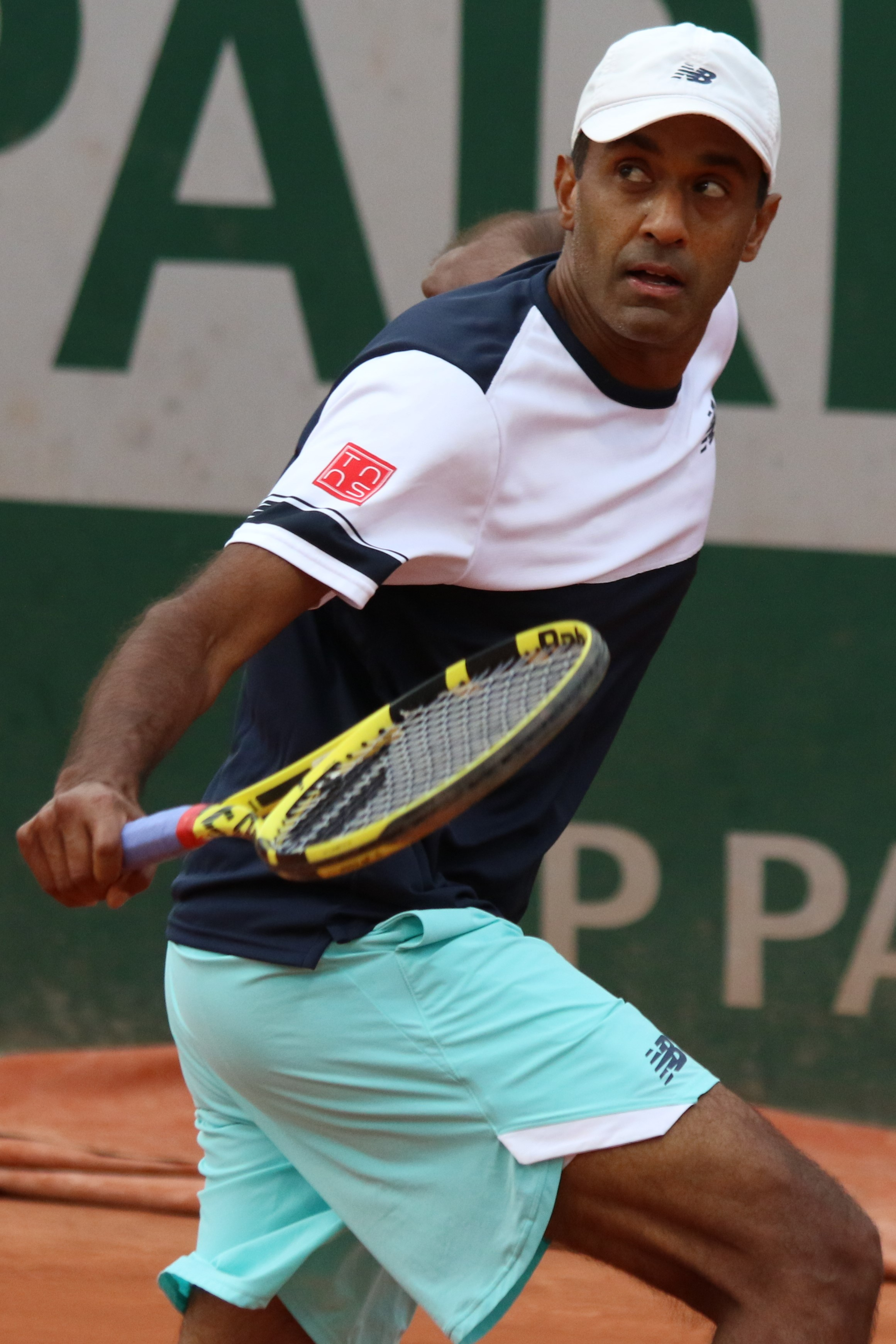
Ram

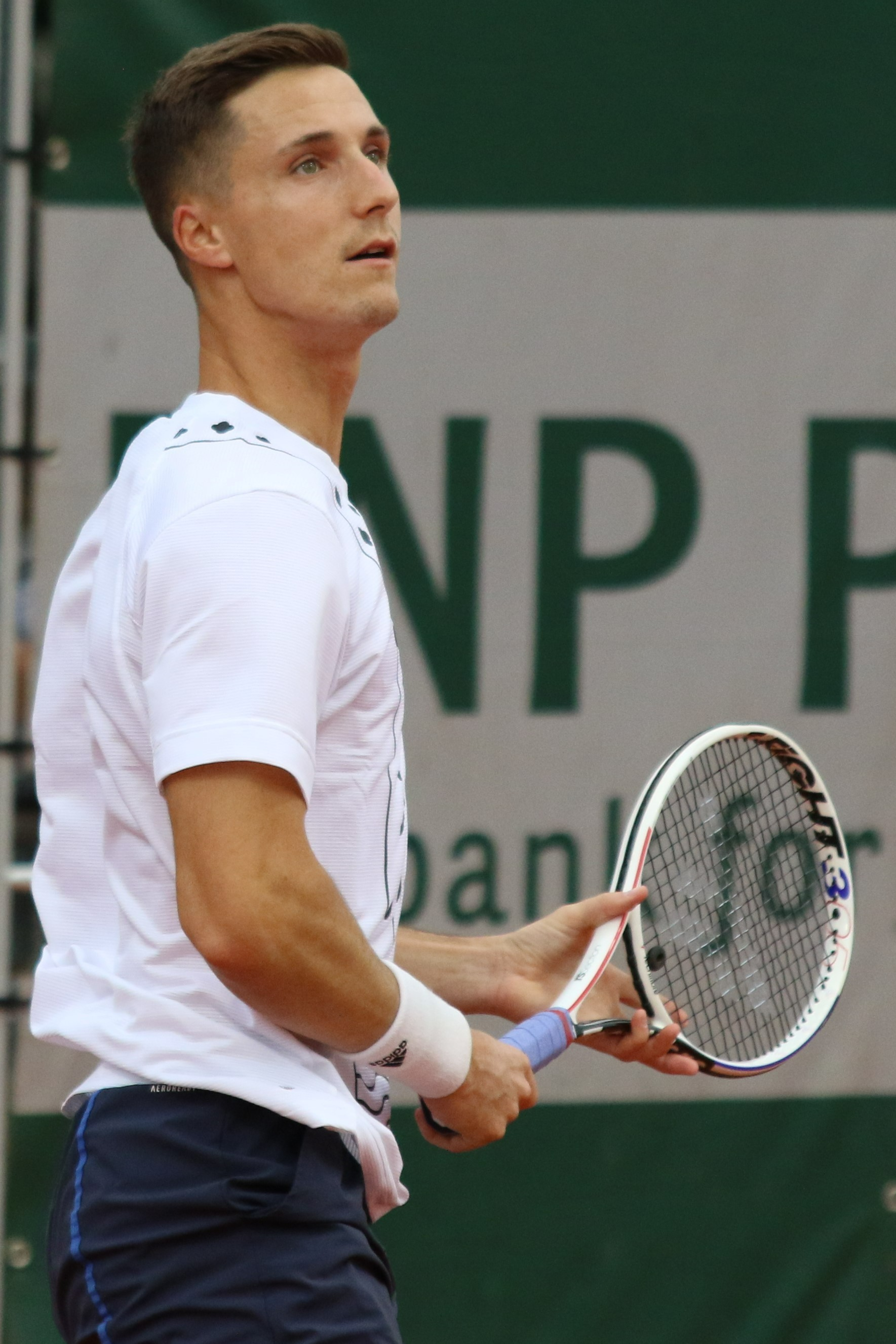
Salisbury

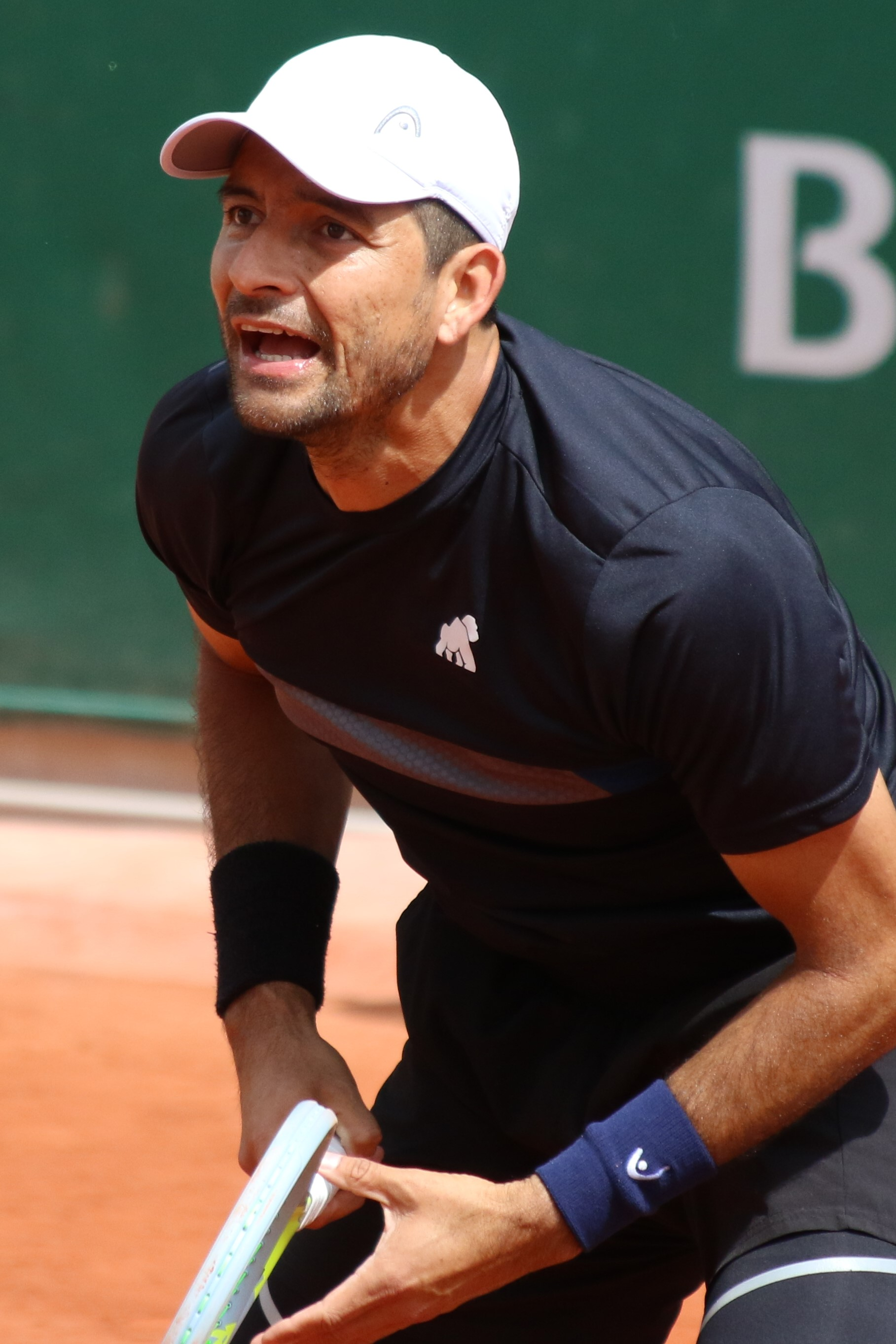
Arévalo

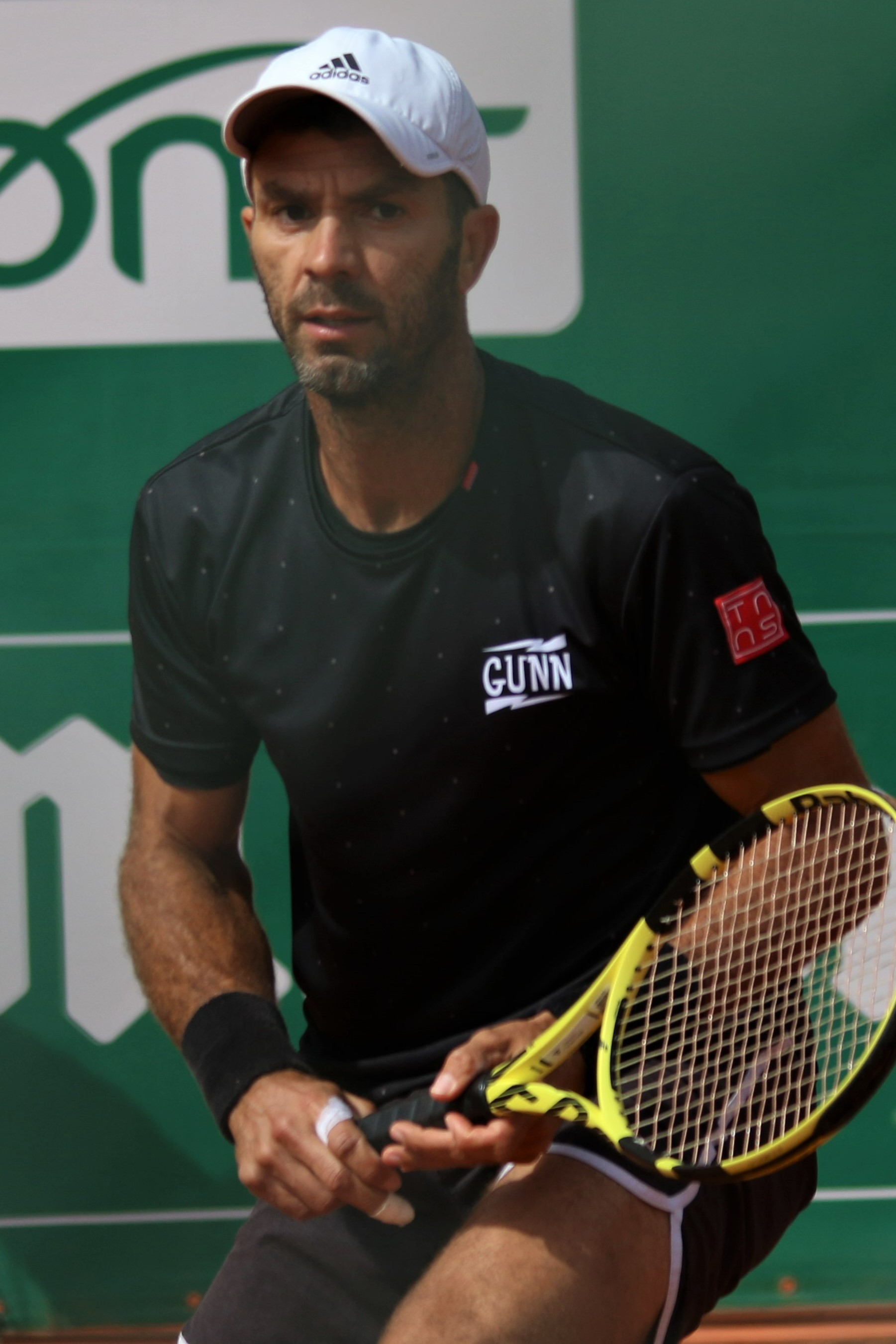
Rojer

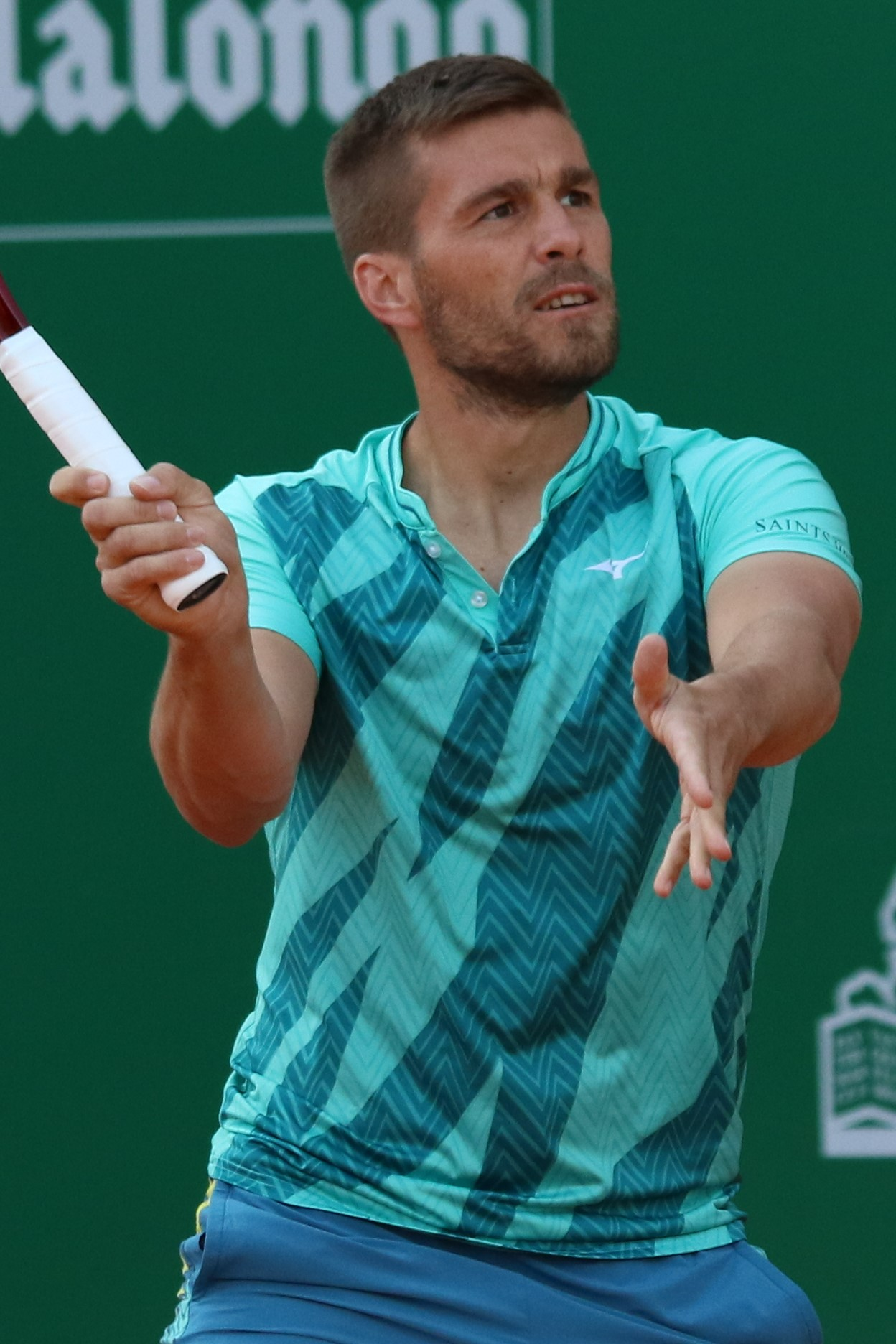
Mektić

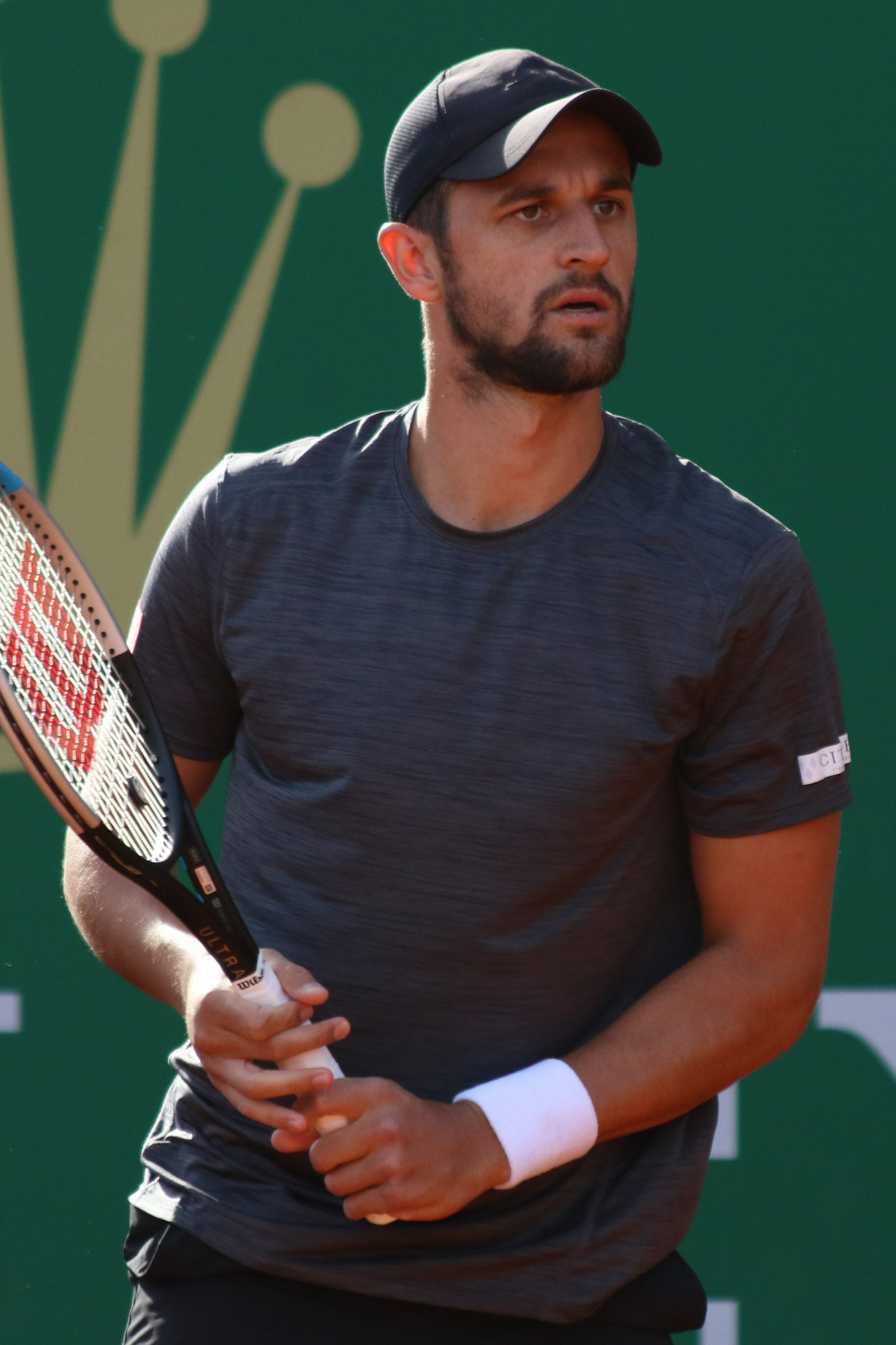
Pavić

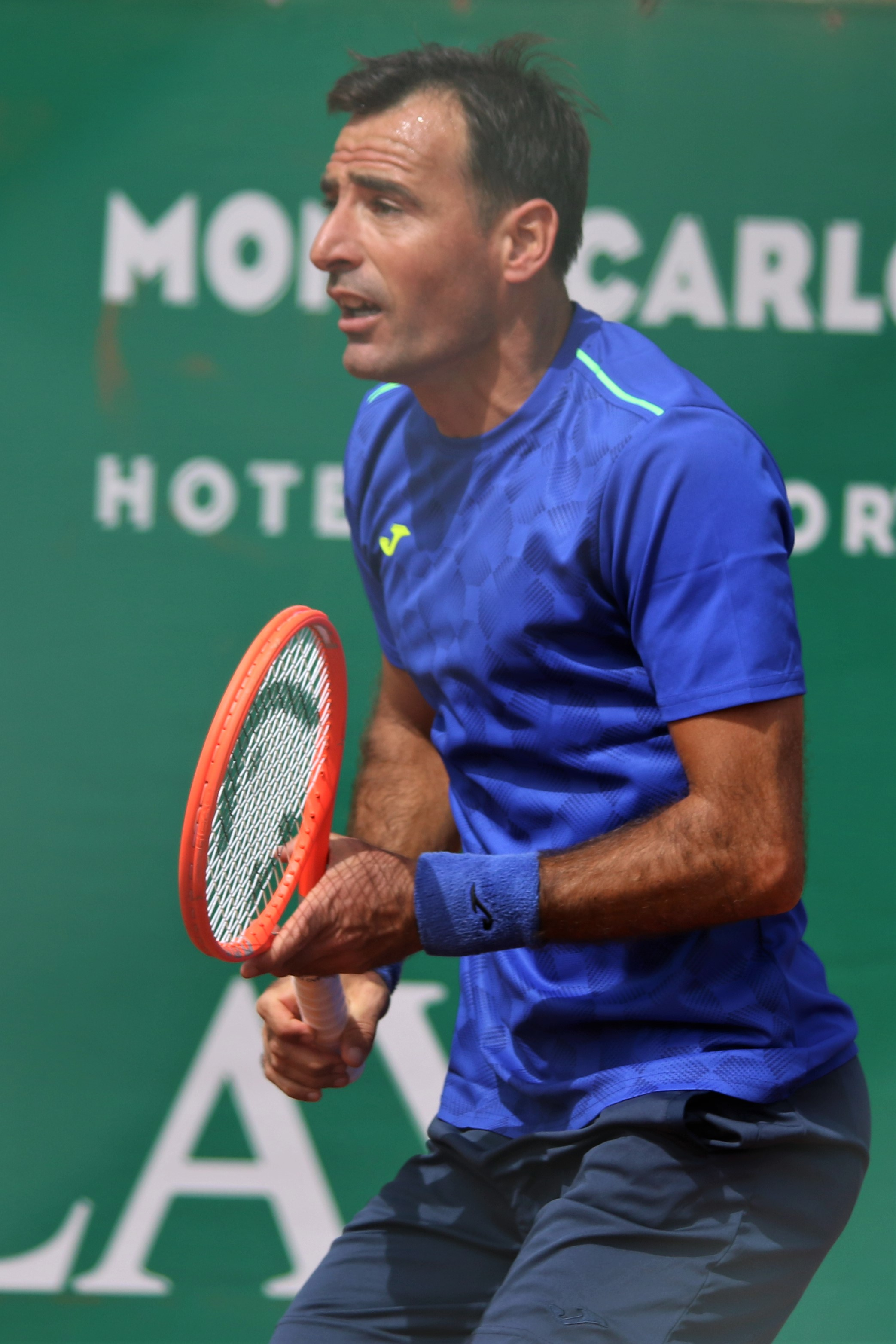
Dodig

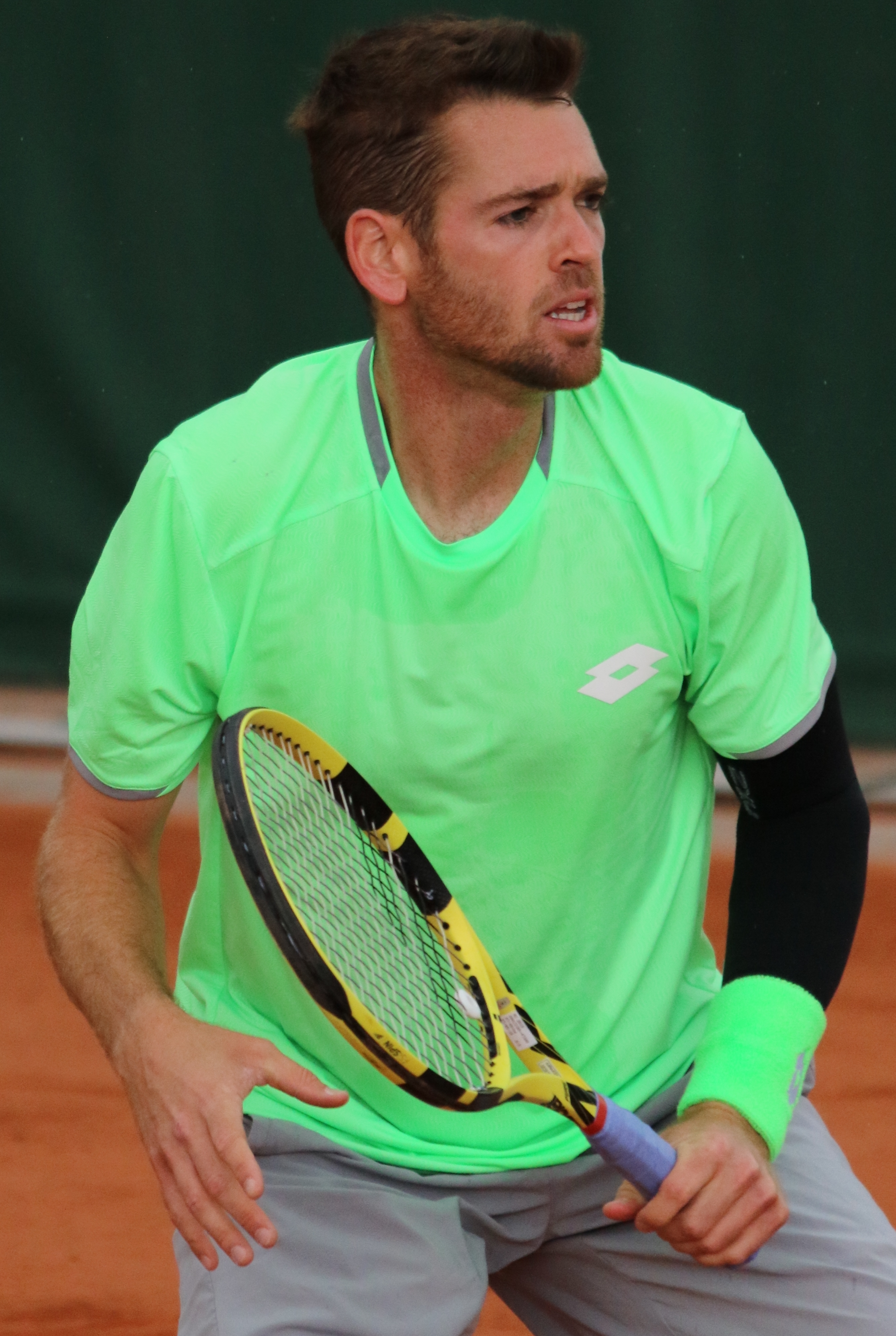
Krajicek

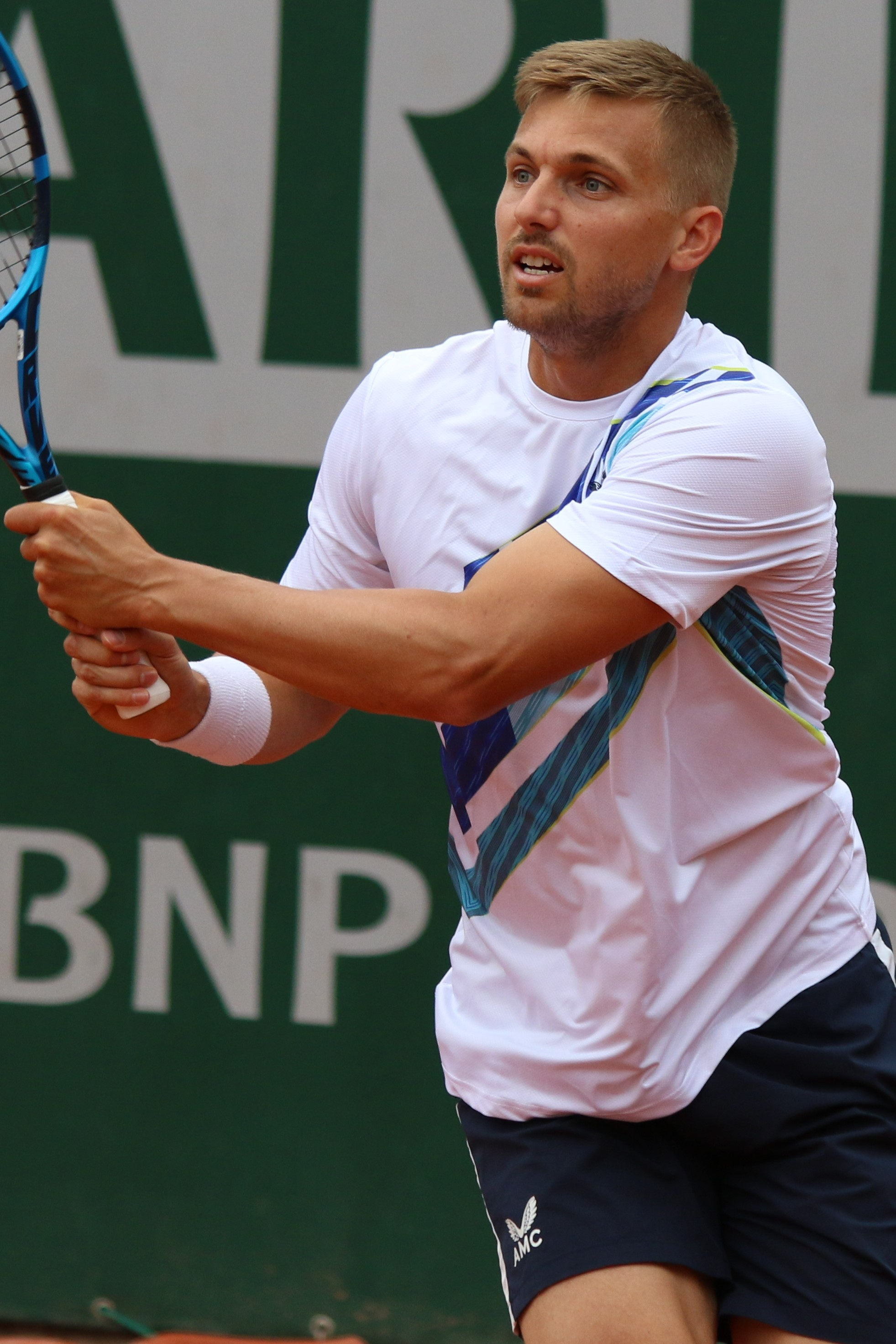
Glasspool

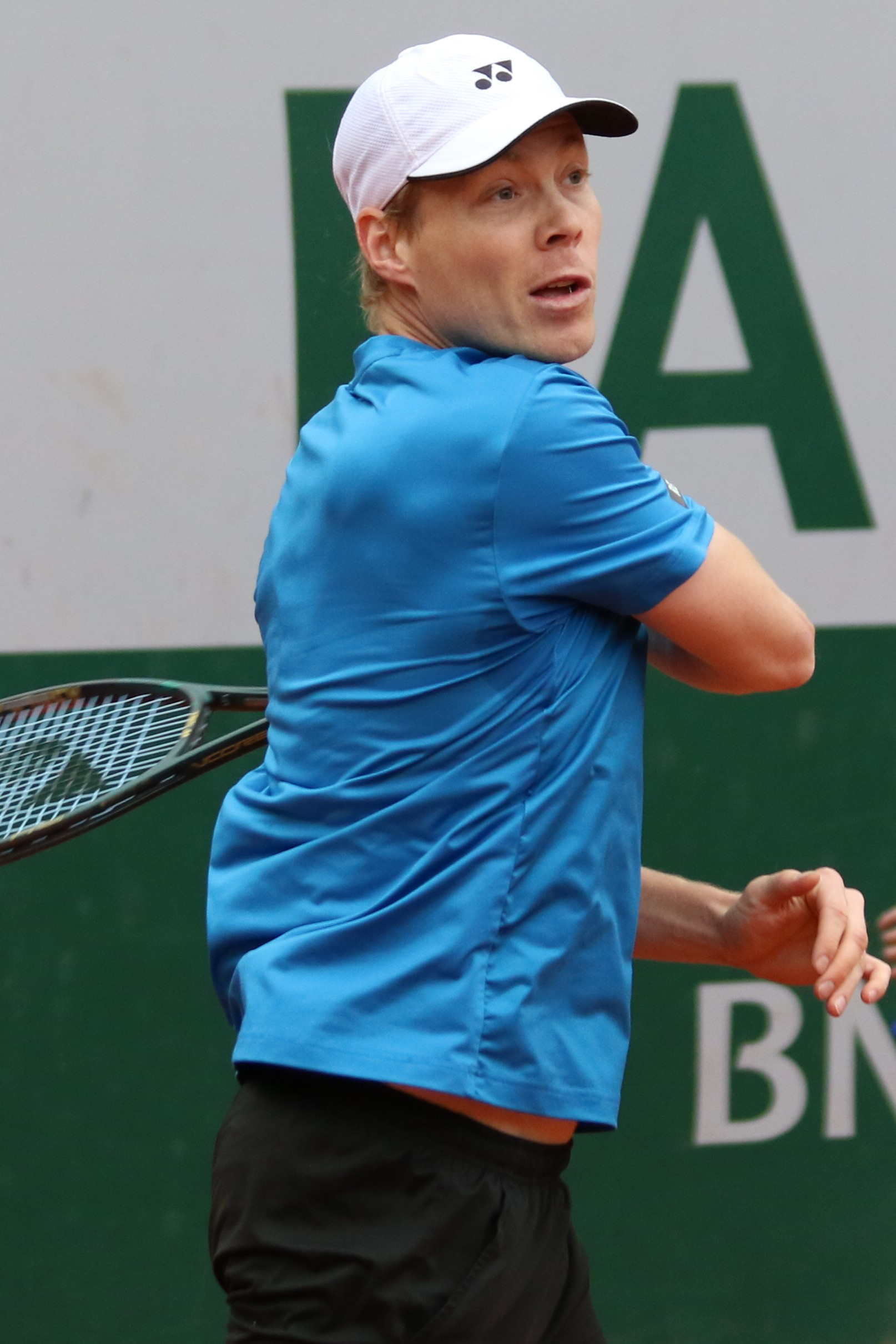
Heliövaara

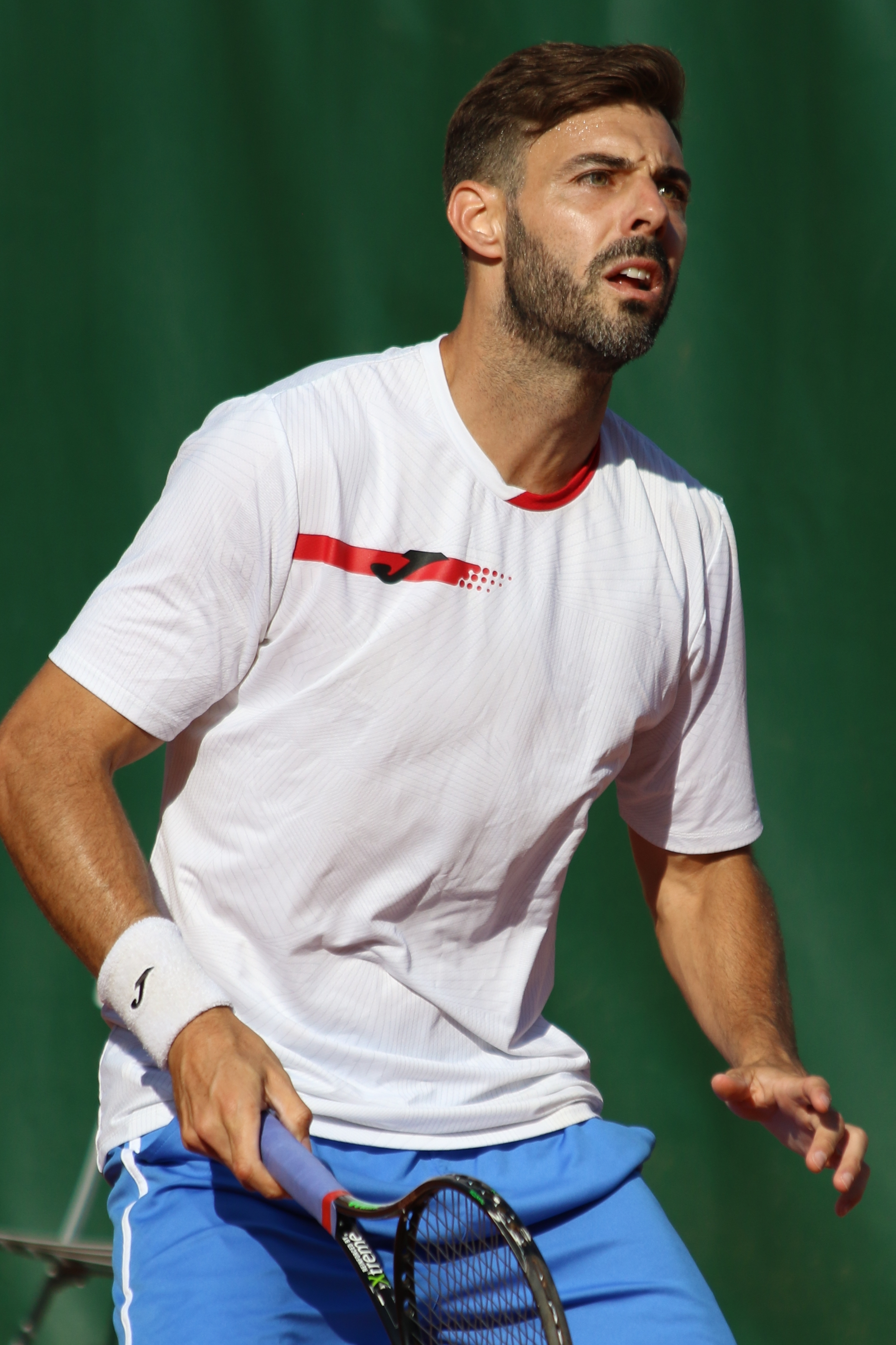
Granollers

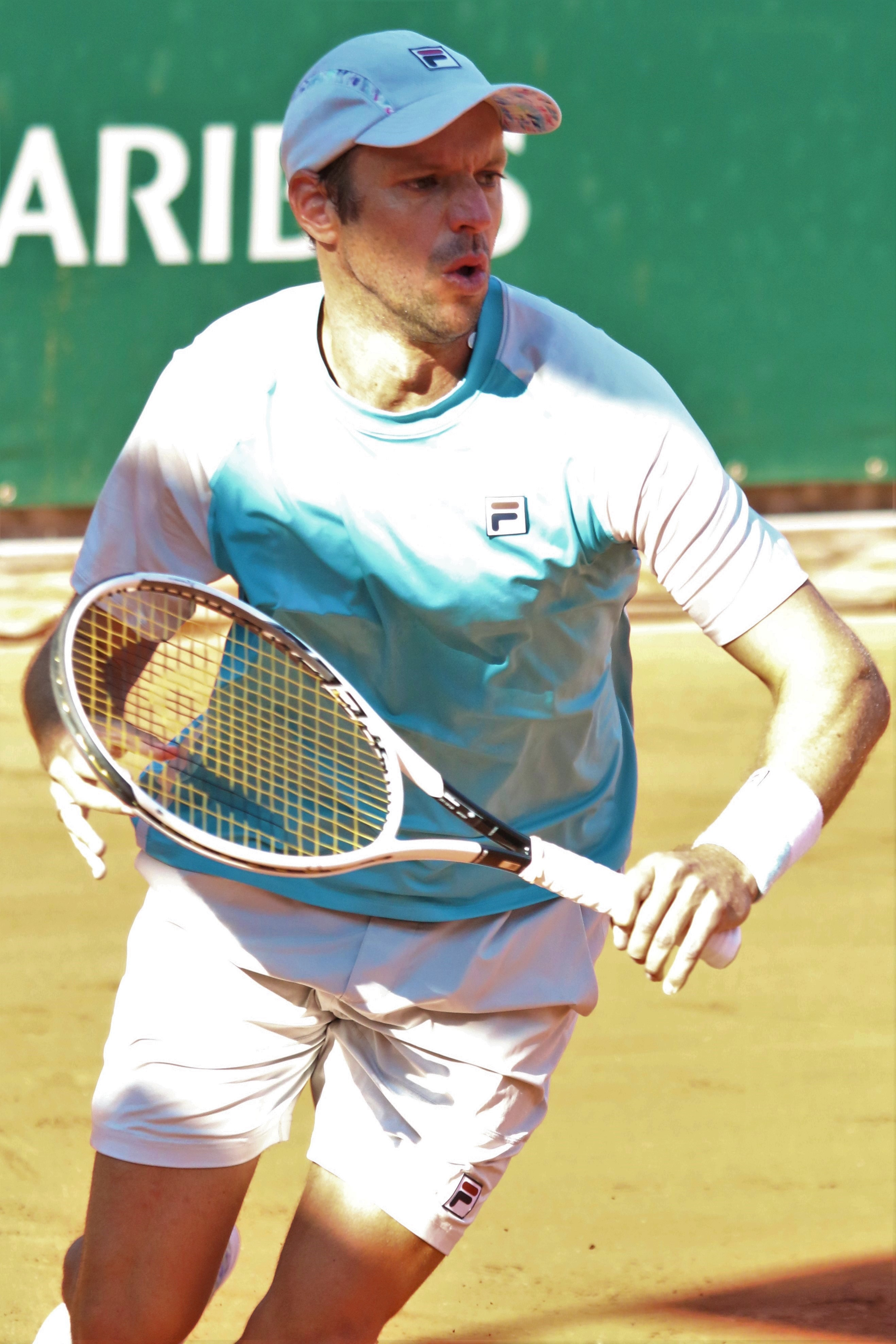
Zeballos

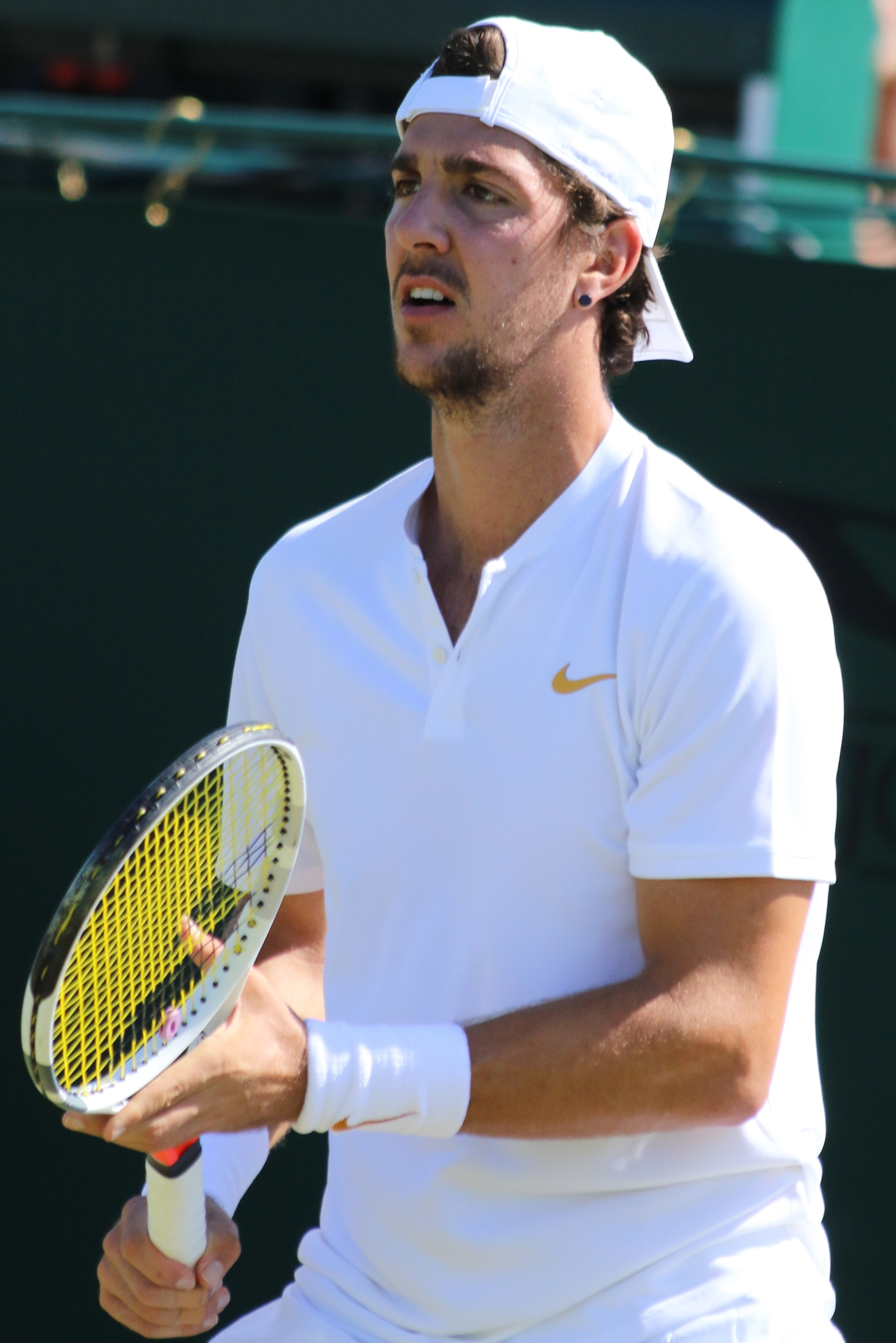
Kokkinakis

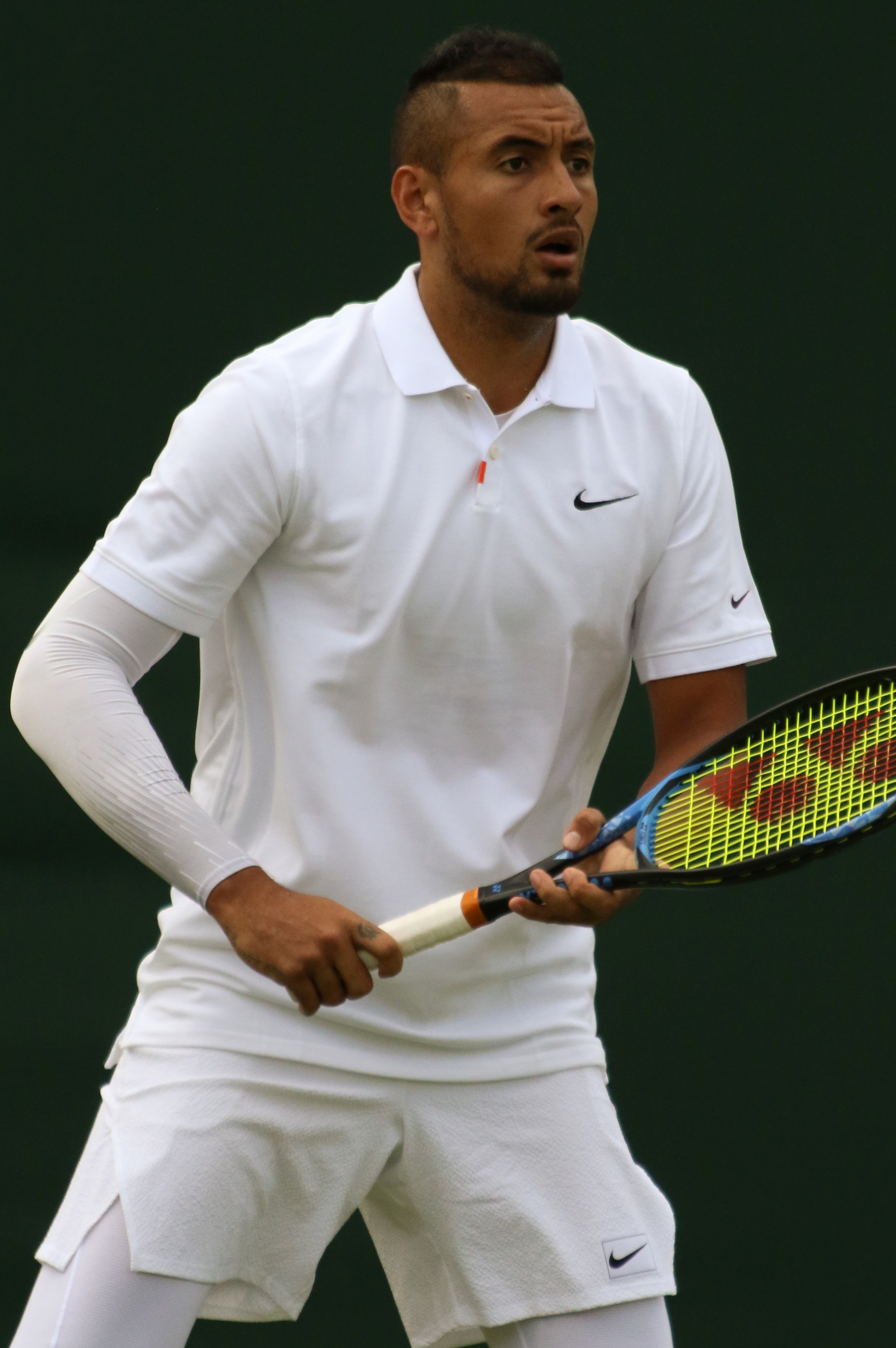
Kyrgios

== Groupings ==
=== Singles ===
The singles draw of the 2022 edition of the Year–end Championships will feature three number ones, three major champions and two major finalists. The competitors were divided into two groups.

Green Group (Spain) Rafael Nadal [1] (Norway) Casper Ruud [3] (Canada) Félix Auger-Aliassime [5] (United States) Taylor Fritz [8]	Red Group (Greece) Stefanos Tsitsipas [2] Daniil Medvedev [4] Andrey Rublev [6] (Serbia) Novak Djokovic [7]

=== Doubles ===
The doubles draw of the 2022 edition of the Year–end Championships will feature six major champions, six number ones and 1 major finalist team. The pairs were divided into two groups.

Green Group (Netherlands) Wesley Koolhof / (United Kingdom) Neal Skupski [1] (Croatia) Nikola Mektić / (Croatia) Mate Pavić [4] (Croatia) Ivan Dodig / (United States) Austin Krajicek [5] (Australia) Thanasi Kokkinakis / (Australia) Nick Kyrgios [8]	Red Group (United States) Rajeev Ram / (United Kingdom) Joe Salisbury [2] (El Salvador) Marcelo Arévalo / (Netherlands) Jean-Julien Rojer [3] (United Kingdom) Lloyd Glasspool / (Finland) Harri Heliövaara [6] (Spain) Marcel Granollers / (Argentina) Horacio Zeballos [7]

== Points breakdown ==
=== Singles ===
Player qualified for ATP Finals.
Player withdrew due to injury.

Seed	Player	Grand Slam				ATP Masters 1000 (Note: The Shanghai Masters was cancelled due to the impact of the COVID-19 pandemic in mainland China.)								Best other								Total points	Tourn	Titles
Seed	Player	AUS	FRA	WI (Note: As of 20 May 2022, the ATP announced that no ranking points will be awarded at the 2022 Wimbledon Championships due to the ban on Russian and Belarusian players.)	USO	IW	MI	MC (Note: Monte Carlo is not a mandatory Masters, so a player can use his next best result instead. Ranking points are shown in italics in this case.)	MA	IT	CA	CI	PA	1	2	3	4	5	6	7	8	Total points	Tourn	Titles
–	(Spain) Carlos Alcaraz	R32; 90	QF; 360	R16 –	W 2000	SF; 360	W 1000	R32; 10	W 1000	A 0	R32; 10	QF; 180	QF; 180	W 500	W 500	F 300	SF; 180	F 150	R32; 0			6,820	17	5
1	(Spain) Rafael Nadal	W 2000	W 2000	SF –	R16; 180	F 600	A 0	A 0	QF; 180	R16; 90	A 0	R32; 10	R32; 10	W 500	W 250							5,820	11	4
2	(Greece) Stefanos Tsitsipas	SF; 720	R16; 180	R32 –	R128; 10	R32; 45	R16; 90	W 1000	SF; 360	F 600	R32; 10	F 600	SF; 360	F 300	F 300	W 250	SF; 180	F 150	QF; 90	RR; 60	R16; 45	5,350	23	2
3	(Norway) Casper Ruud	A 0	F 1200	R64 –	F 1200	R32; 45	F 600	R16; 90	R32; 10	SF; 360	SF; 360	R32; 10	R16; 90	W 250	W 250	W 250	RR; 125	QF; 90	QF; 45	QF; 45	R32; 0	5,020	22	3
4	Daniil Medvedev (Note: As of 1 March 2022, the ATP announced that players from Russia and Belarus will not compete under the name or flag of Russia or Belarus due to the Russian invasion of Ukraine.)	F 1200	R16; 180	A –	R16; 180	R32; 45	QF; 180	A 0	A 0	A 0	R32; 10	SF; 360	R32; 10	W 500	F 300	SF; 295	W 250	SF; 180	SF; 180	F 150	QF; 45	4,065	18	2
5	(Canada) Félix Auger-Aliassime	QF; 360	R16; 180	R128 –	R64; 45	R64; 10	R64; 10	SF; 90	QF; 180	QF; 180	QF; 180	QF; 180	SF; 360	W 500	W 500	W 390	W 250	W 250	F 150	QF; 90	QF; 90	3,995	27	5
6	Andrey Rublev	R32; 90	QF; 360	A –	QF; 360	SF; 360	R64; 10	R16; 90	QF; 180	R32; 10	R32; 10	R16; 90	R16; 90	W 500	W 250	W 250	W 250	SF; 180	SF; 180	SF; 180	SF; 90	3,530	22	4
7	(Serbia) Novak Djokovic (Note: Djokovic initially qualified for the ATP Finals as a Grand Slam champion ranked in the top 20 after the Paris Masters, but he subsequently earned a direct qualification spot by reaching the Paris Masters semifinal.)	A 0	QF; 360	W –	A 0	A 0	A 0	R32; 10	SF; 360	W 1000	A 0	A 0	F 600	W 500	W 250	F 150	QF; 90					3,320	10	4
8	(United States) Taylor Fritz	R16; 180	R64; 45	QF –	R128; 10	W 1000	R16; 90	QF; 180	A 0	A 0	R16; 90	QF; 180	R32; 45	W 500	W 250	RR; 160	R16; 45	R16; 45	R16; 45	QF; 45	QF; 45	2,955	21	3
Alternates
9	(Denmark) Holger Rune (Note: Rune's ranking at the time did not qualify him for the main draw in Miami, Madrid or Rome, so he can substitute his next best results for those tournaments. Ranking points are shown in italics in this case.)	R128; 10	QF; 360	R128 –	R32; 90	R64; 41	SF; 35	R32; 70	R16; 20	R16; 20	R32; 45	R64; 10	W 1000	F 300	W 250	W 250	F 150	SF; 90	W 80	R16; 45	QF; 45	2,911	30	4
10	(Poland) Hubert Hurkacz	R64; 45	R16; 180	R128 –	R64; 45	R16; 90	SF; 360	QF; 180	QF; 180	R64; 10	F 600	R32; 10	R32; 45	W 500	SF; 180	SF; 120	QF; 90	QF; 90	SF; 90	R16; 45	QF; 45	2,905	22	1

=== Doubles ===
Team qualified for ATP Finals.

Seed	Team	Points																				Total points	Tourn	Titles
Seed	Team	1	2	3	4	5	6	7	8	9	10	11	12	13	14	15	16	17	18	19	WI (Note: The 2022 Wimbledon Championships was stripped of its ranking points due to the ban on Russian and Belarusian players.)	Total points	Tourn	Titles
1	(Netherlands) Wesley Koolhof (United Kingdom) Neal Skupski	F 1200	W 1000	W 1000	W 1000	F 600	QF; 360	QF; 360	F 300	W 250	W 250	W 250	W 250	QF; 180	QF; 180	SF; 180	QF; 90	R16; 0	R32; 0	R16; 0	R16 –	7,450	24	7
2	(United States) Rajeev Ram (United Kingdom) Joe Salisbury	W 2000	W 1000	W 1000	SF; 720	QF; 360	SF; 360	QF; 180	QF; 180	QF; 90	R16; 0	R32; 0	R16; 0	R16; 0	R16; 0	R16; 0	R16; 0				SF –	5,890	17	3
3	(El Salvador) Marcelo Arévalo (Netherlands) Jean-Julien Rojer	W 2000	SF; 720	SF; 360	F 300	W 250	W 250	W 250	QF; 180	QF; 180	SF; 180	SF; 180	R16; 90	QF; 90	SF; 90	SF; 90	QF; 45	R64; 0	R16; 0	R32; 0	R64 –	5,255	24	4
4	(Croatia) Nikola Mektić (Croatia) Mate Pavić	W 1000	W 500	W 500	QF; 360	F 300	W 250	W 250	R16; 180	QF; 180	F 150	R32; 90	R16; 90	R16; 90	R16; 90	QF; 45	QF; 45	QF; 45	R16; 0	R32; 0	F –	4,165	23	5
5	(Croatia) Ivan Dodig (United States) Austin Krajicek	F 1200	F 600	W 500	F 300	W 250	W 250	SF; 180	F 150	R32; 90	QF; 90	SF; 90	R32; 0	R32; 0	R32; 0	R16; 0	R16; 0	R16; 0	R16; 0		R16 –	3,700	19	3
6	(United Kingdom) Lloyd Glasspool (Finland) Harri Heliövaara	W 500	QF; 360	QF; 360	SF; 360	F 300	SF; 205	QF; 180	QF; 180	F 150	F 150	F 150	F 150	F 150	R32; 90	R16; 90	SF; 90	SF; 90	QF; 45	R16; 0	R16 –	3,600	26	1
7	(Spain) Marcel Granollers (Argentina) Horacio Zeballos	SF; 720	SF; 720	W 500	QF; 180	QF; 180	QF; 180	QF; 180	QF; 180	SF; 180	SF; 180	SF; 180	R16; 90	QF; 90	R64; 0	R16; 0	R16; 0	R16; 0	R16; 0		A –	3,560	18	1
8	(Australia) Thanasi Kokkinakis (Australia) Nick Kyrgios (Note: As one of this year's Grand Slam doubles champions, Kokkinakis/Kyrgios qualified for the ATP Finals because they were ranked in the top 20 after the Paris Masters and ranked higher than fellow Grand Slam champions Ebden/Purcell.)	W 2000	SF; 360	W 250	R16; 180	SF; 180	R16; 90	R16; 90													A –	3,150	7	2
Alternates
9	(Australia) Matthew Ebden (Australia) Max Purcell (Note: As one of this year's Grand Slam doubles champions, Ebden/Purcell served as the first alternates at the ATP Finals because they were ranked in the top 20 after the Paris Masters but ranked behind fellow Grand Slam champions Kokkinakis/Kyrgios.)	F 1200	W 250	R16; 180	F 150	R16; 90	R16; 90	QF; 90	QF; 45	QF; 45	QF; 45	R64; 0	R32; 0	R32; 0	R16; 0	R16; 0					W –	2,185	16	2
10	(Germany) Tim Pütz (New Zealand) Michael Venus	F 600	W 500	QF; 360	F 300	R16; 180	R16; 180	QF; 180	QF; 180	SF; 180	F 150	F 150	R16; 90	QF; 90	R32; 0	R16; 0	R16; 0	R16; 0			R64 –	3,140	18	1

== Head-to-head records ==
Below are the head-to-head records as they approached the tournament.

=== Singles ===
		Nadal	Tsitsipas	Ruud	Medvedev	Auger-Aliassime	Rublev	Djokovic	Fritz	Overall	YTD W–L
1	(Spain) Rafael Nadal		7–2	1–0	5–1	2–0	2–1	29–30	2–1	48–35	38–6
2	(Greece) Stefanos Tsitsipas	2–7		1–1	3–7	5–3	6–4	2–9	3–0	22–31	60–22
3	(Norway) Casper Ruud	0–1	1–1		0–3	2–1	1–4	0–3	0–0	4–13	48–20
4	Daniil Medvedev	1–5	7–3	3–0		4–0	4–1	4–7	1–0	24–16	45–16
5	(Canada) Félix Auger-Aliassime	0–2	3–5	1–2	0–4		1–3	1–1	0–1	6–18	56–25
6	Andrey Rublev	1–2	4–6	4–1	1–4	3–1		1–1	2–4	16–19	49–18
7	(Serbia) Novak Djokovic	30–29	9–2	3–0	7–4	1–1	1–1		5–0	56–37	37–7
8	(United States) Taylor Fritz	1–2	0–3	0–0	0–1	1–0	4–2	0–5		6–13	43–19

=== Doubles ===
		Koolhof; Skupski	Ram; Salisbury	Arévalo; Rojer	Mektić; Pavić	Dodig; Krajicek	Glasspool; Heliövaara	Granollers; Zeballos	Kokkinakis; Kyrgios	Overall	YTD W–L
1	(Netherlands) Wesley Koolhof (United Kingdom) Neal Skupski		1–2	4–0	0–1	1–0	2–1	0–1	0–0	8–5	54–17
2	(United States) Rajeev Ram (United Kingdom) Joe Salisbury	2–1		0–0	2–4	0–2	0–1	4–2	1–0	9–10	32–14
3	(El Salvador) Marcelo Arévalo (Netherlands) Jean-Julien Rojer	0–4	0–0		1–0	1–1	1–0	0–0	0–0	3–5	38–19
4	(Croatia) Nikola Mektić (Croatia) Mate Pavić	1–0	4–2	0–1		0–0	3–0	2–2	0–1	10–6	47–19
5	(Croatia) Ivan Dodig (United States) Austin Krajicek	0–1	2–0	1–1	0–0		0–1	1–1	0–0	4–4	34–15
6	(United Kingdom) Lloyd Glasspool (Finland) Harri Heliövaara	1–2	1–0	0–1	0–3	1–0		0–0	1–0	4–6	45–25
7	(Spain) Marcel Granollers (Argentina) Horacio Zeballos	1–0	2–4	0–0	2–2	1–1	0–0		0–2	6–9	23–17
8	(Australia) Thanasi Kokkinakis (Australia) Nick Kyrgios	0–0	0–1	0–0	1–0	0–0	0–1	2–0		3–2	18–4

== See also ==
- ATP rankings
- 2022 ATP Tour
- 2022 WTA Finals
- ATP Finals appearances
