= 2022 Erste Bank Open =

- Date: 24–30 October
- Edition: 48th
- Category: ATP Tour 500 Series
- Draw: 32S / 16D
- Prize money: €2,349,180
- Surface: Hard (indoor)
- Location: Vienna, Austria
- Venue: Wiener Stadthalle

Champions

Singles
- Daniil Medvedev

Doubles
- (Austria) Alexander Erler / (Austria) Lucas Miedler
- Vienna Open

The 2022 Erste Bank Open was a men's tennis tournament to be played on indoor hard courts. It was the 48th edition of the event, and part of the ATP Tour 500 Series of the 2022 ATP Tour. It was held at the Wiener Stadthalle in Vienna, Austria, from 24 until 30 October 2022.

== Champions ==
=== Singles ===
- Daniil Medvedev def. (Canada) Denis Shapovalov, 4–6, 6–3, 6–2

=== Doubles ===
- (Austria) Alexander Erler / (Austria) Lucas Miedler def. (Mexico) Santiago González / (Argentina) Andrés Molteni, 6–3, 7–6^{(7–1)}

== Singles main-draw entrants ==
=== Seeds ===
Country	Player	Rank^{1}	Seed
	Daniil Medvedev	4	1
GRE	Stefanos Tsitsipas	5	2
	Andrey Rublev	8	3
USA	Taylor Fritz	9	4
POL	Hubert Hurkacz	11	5
ITA	Jannik Sinner	12	6
GBR	Cameron Norrie	14	7
~~ITA~~	~~Matteo Berrettini~~	~~16~~	~~8~~

- Rankings are as of 17 October 2022

=== Other entrants ===
The following players received wildcards into the singles main draw:

- (Austria) Filip Misolic
- (Austria) Dennis Novak
- (Austria) Jurij Rodionov

The following player received entry as a special exempt:

- (Finland) Emil Ruusuvuori

The following players received entry from the qualifying draw:

- (France) Quentin Halys
- (Brazil) Thiago Monteiro
- (Japan) Yoshihito Nishioka
- (United States) J. J. Wolf

The following players received entry as lucky losers:

- (Argentina) Pedro Cachin
- (Germany) Oscar Otte

=== Withdrawals ===
- (Italy) Matteo Berrettini → replaced by (Germany) Oscar Otte
- (United States) John Isner → replaced by (United States) Marcos Giron
- (France) Gaël Monfils → replaced by (Argentina) Pedro Cachin

== Doubles main-draw entrants ==
=== Seeds ===
Country	Player	Country	Player	Rank^{1}	Seed
USA	Rajeev Ram	GBR	Joe Salisbury	3	1
NED	Wesley Koolhof	GBR	Neal Skupski	7	2
CRO	Nikola Mektić	CRO	Mate Pavić	15	3
COL	Juan Sebastián Cabal	COL	Robert Farah	30	4

- Rankings are as of 17 October 2022

=== Other entrants ===
The following pairs received wildcards into the doubles main draw:

- (Austria) Alexander Erler / (Austria) Lucas Miedler
- (Netherlands) Robin Haase / (Austria) Philipp Oswald

The following pair received entry from the qualifying draw:

- (Belgium) Sander Gillé / (Belgium) Joran Vliegen
