= 2022 Halle Open =

- Date: 13–19 June
- Edition: 29th
- Category: ATP Tour 500
- Draw: 32S / 16D
- Prize money: €2,134,520
- Surface: Grass
- Location: Halle, Germany
- Venue: OWL Arena

Champions

Singles
- (Poland) Hubert Hurkacz

Doubles
- (Spain) Marcel Granollers / (Argentina) Horacio Zeballos
- Halle Open

The 2022 Halle Open (known for sponsorship reasons as the Terra Wortmann Open) was a men's tennis tournament played on outdoor grass courts. It was the 29th edition of the Halle Open and part of the ATP Tour 500 series of the 2022 ATP Tour. It took place at the OWL Arena in Halle, Germany, between 13 June and 19 June 2022. Fifth-seeded Hubert Hurkacz won the singles title.

== Finals ==
=== Singles ===
- (Poland) Hubert Hurkacz defeated Daniil Medvedev, 6–1, 6–4

=== Doubles ===
- (Spain) Marcel Granollers / (Argentina) Horacio Zeballos defeated (Germany) Tim Pütz / (New Zealand) Michael Venus, 6–4, 6–7^{(5–7)}, [14–12]

== Points and prize money ==
=== Points distribution ===
Event	W	F	SF	QF	Round of 16	Round of 32	Q	Q2	Q1
Singles	500	300	180	90	45	0	20	10	0
Doubles	500	300	180	90	45	0	45	25	0

=== Prize money ===
Event	W	F	SF	QF	Round of 16	Round of 32	Q2	Q1
Singles	€399,170	€84,075	€59,860	€40,765	€25,480	€14,650	€6,750	€3,565
Doubles*	€40,200	€30,240	€21,760	€14,340	€9,020	€5,000	—N/a	—N/a

_{*per team}

== Singles main draw entrants ==
=== Seeds ===
Country	Player	Rank^{1}	Seed
	Daniil Medvedev	2	1
GRE	Stefanos Tsitsipas	5	2
	Andrey Rublev	8	3
CAN	Félix Auger-Aliassime	9	4
POL	Hubert Hurkacz	13	5
ESP	Pablo Carreño Busta	19	6
ESP	Roberto Bautista Agut	20	7
	Karen Khachanov	23	8

- ^{1} Rankings are as of 6 June 2022.

=== Other entrants ===
The following players received wildcards into the main draw:

- (Australia) Nick Kyrgios
- (Germany) Henri Squire
- (Germany) Jan-Lennard Struff

The following player received entry as a special exempt:

- (Germany) Oscar Otte

The following players received entry from the qualifying draw:

- (Moldova) Radu Albot
- (United States) Maxime Cressy
- (Netherlands) Tallon Griekspoor
- (Switzerland) Marc-Andrea Hüsler

=== Withdrawals ===
Before the tournament

- (South Africa) Lloyd Harris → replaced by (Germany) Daniel Altmaier
- (Italy) Jannik Sinner → replaced by (United States) Mackenzie McDonald
- (Germany) Alexander Zverev → replaced by (France) Benjamin Bonzi

== Doubles main draw entrants ==
=== Seeds ===
Country	Player	Country	Player	Rank^{1}	Seed
ESP	Marcel Granollers	ARG	Horacio Zeballos	11	1
ESA	Marcelo Arévalo	NED	Jean-Julien Rojer	29	2
GER	Tim Pütz	NZL	Michael Venus	30	3
CRO	Ivan Dodig	USA	Austin Krajicek	42	4

- ^{1} Rankings are as of 6 June 2022.

=== Other entrants ===
The following pairs received wildcards into the doubles main draw:

- (Germany) Daniel Altmaier / (Germany) Oscar Otte
- (Jamaica) Dustin Brown / (Switzerland) Dominic Stricker

The following pair received entry from the qualifying draw:

- ~~(Uruguay) Ariel Behar / (Ecuador) Gonzalo Escobar~~

The following pairs received entry as lucky losers:

- (Netherlands) Tallon Griekspoor / (Slovakia) Alex Molčan
- (Germany) Yannick Hanfmann / (Germany) Jan-Lennard Struff

=== Withdrawals ===
- (Uruguay) Ariel Behar / (Ecuador) Gonzalo Escobar → replaced by (Netherlands) Tallon Griekspoor / (Slovakia) Alex Molčan
- Andrey Rublev / (Germany) Alexander Zverev → replaced by (Germany) Yannick Hanfmann / (Germany) Jan-Lennard Struff
