= 2022 Erste Bank Open – Doubles =

Doubles
- 2022 Erste Bank Open

Final
- Champions: (Austria) Alexander Erler (Austria) Lucas Miedler
- Runners-up: (Mexico) Santiago González (Argentina) Andrés Molteni
- Score: 6–3, 7–6^{(7–1)}

Details
- Draw: 16
- Seeds: 4

Events
Singles	Doubles
- Vienna Open

Alexander Erler and Lucas Miedler defeated Santiago González and Andrés Molteni in the final, 6–3, 7–6^{(7–1)} to win the doubles tennis title at the 2022 Vienna Open. It was both men's second career ATP Tour doubles title, and their second won in their home country of Austria.

Juan Sebastián Cabal and Robert Farah were the defending champions, but lost in the first round to Francisco Cerúndolo and Máximo González.

== Seeds ==
1. (United States) Rajeev Ram / (United Kingdom) Joe Salisbury (first round)
2. (Netherlands) Wesley Koolhof / (United Kingdom) Neal Skupski (first round)
3. (Croatia) Nikola Mektić / (Croatia) Mate Pavić (first round)
4. (Colombia) Juan Sebastián Cabal / (Colombia) Robert Farah (first round)

== Draw ==
Key

- Q = Qualifier
- WC = Wild card
- LL = Lucky loser
- Alt = Alternate
- ITF = ITF entry
- PR = Protected ranking
- SR = Special ranking
- SE = Special exempt
- JE = Junior exempt
- JR = Junior Accelerator Programme entrant
- CO = College Accelerator Programme entrant
- NG = Next Gen Accelerator Program entrant
- w/o = Walkover
- r = Retired
- d = Defaulted

=== Draw ===
First round
1	(United States) R Ram (United Kingdom) J Salisbury	3	2
(United Kingdom) D Evans (Australia) J Peers	6	6
Q	(Belgium) S Gillé (Belgium) J Vliegen	6	3	[12]
(Germany) K Krawietz (Germany) A Mies	3	6	[10]
3	(Croatia) N Mektić (Croatia) M Pavić	6	3	[4]
(Poland) H Hurkacz (Brazil) M Melo	1	6	[10]
WC	(Austria) A Erler (Austria) L Miedler	6	7^{7}
K Khachanov; A Rublev	3	6^{1}
WC	(Netherlands) R Haase (Austria) P Oswald	7^{7}	7
PR	(Poland) Ł Kubot (France) F Martin	6^{4}	5
(Argentina) F Cerúndolo (Argentina) M González	7^{7}	6
4	(Colombia) JS Cabal (Colombia) R Farah	6^{4}	3
(Argentina) P Cachin (Argentina) D Schwartzman	1	3
(India) R Bopanna (Netherlands) M Middelkoop	6	6
(Mexico) S González (Argentina) A Molteni	7^{8}	7
2	(Netherlands) W Koolhof (United Kingdom) N Skupski	6^{6}	5

Quarterfinals
(United Kingdom) D Evans (Australia) J Peers	6	3	[9]
Q	(Belgium) S Gillé (Belgium) J Vliegen	3	6	[11]
(Poland) H Hurkacz (Brazil) M Melo	6^{6}	4
WC	(Austria) A Erler (Austria) L Miedler	7^{8}	6
WC	(Netherlands) R Haase (Austria) P Oswald	7	3	[10]
(Argentina) F Cerúndolo (Argentina) M González	5	6	[12]
(India) R Bopanna (Netherlands) M Middelkoop	2	7^{7}	[8]
(Mexico) S González (Argentina) A Molteni	6	6^{4}	[10]

Semifinals
Q	(Belgium) S Gillé (Belgium) J Vliegen	6^{4}	6^{5}
WC	(Austria) A Erler (Austria) L Miedler	7^{7}	7^{7}
(Argentina) F Cerúndolo (Argentina) M González	3	4
(Mexico) S González (Argentina) A Molteni	6	6

Final
WC	(Austria) A Erler (Austria) L Miedler	6	7^{7}
(Mexico) S González (Argentina) A Molteni	3	6^{1}

== Qualifying ==
=== Seeds ===
1. (Bosnia and Herzegovina) Tomislav Brkić / (Ecuador) Gonzalo Escobar (qualifying competition)
2. (Colombia) Nicolás Barrientos / (Mexico) Miguel Ángel Reyes-Varela (first round)

=== Qualifiers ===
1. (Belgium) Sander Gillé / (Belgium) Joran Vliegen

=== Qualifying draw ===
First round
1	(Bosnia and Herzegovina) Tomislav Brkić (Ecuador) Gonzalo Escobar	5	6	[11]
WC	(Austria) Neil Oberleitner (Austria) Jurij Rodionov	7	4	[9]
(Belgium) Sander Gillé (Belgium) Joran Vliegen	7^{8}	6
2	(Colombia) Nicolás Barrientos (Mexico) Miguel Ángel Reyes-Varela	6^{6}	1

Qualifying competition
1	(Bosnia and Herzegovina) Tomislav Brkić (Ecuador) Gonzalo Escobar	6^{0}	6	[4]
(Belgium) Sander Gillé (Belgium) Joran Vliegen	7^{7}	4	[10]
