= 2022 Halle Open – Singles =

Singles
- 2022 Halle Open

Final
- Champion: (Poland) Hubert Hurkacz
- Runner-up: Daniil Medvedev
- Score: 6–1, 6–4

Details
- Draw: 32 (4 Q / 3 WC )
- Seeds: 8

Events
Singles	Doubles
← 2021 ·	Halle Open	· 2023 →

Hubert Hurkacz defeated Daniil Medvedev in the final, 6–1, 6–4 to win the singles tennis title at the 2022 Halle Open.

Ugo Humbert was the defending champion, but was defeated by Hurkacz in the second round.

== Seeds ==
1. Daniil Medvedev (final)
2. (Greece) Stefanos Tsitsipas (second round)
3. Andrey Rublev (first round)
4. (Canada) Félix Auger-Aliassime (quarterfinals)
5. (Poland) Hubert Hurkacz (champion)
6. (Spain) Pablo Carreño Busta (quarterfinals)
7. (Spain) Roberto Bautista Agut (quarterfinals)
8. Karen Khachanov (quarterfinals)

== Draw ==
=== Key ===
- Q = Qualifier
- WC = Wild card
- LL = Lucky loser
- Alt = Alternate
- SE = Special exempt
- PR = Protected ranking
- ITF = ITF entry
- JE = Junior exempt
- w/o = Walkover
- r = Retired
- d = Defaulted
- SR = Special ranking

=== Finals ===
Semifinals
1	Daniil Medvedev	7^{7}	6
SE	(Germany) Oscar Otte	6^{3}	3
5	(Poland) Hubert Hurkacz	4	7^{7}	7^{7}
WC	(Australia) Nick Kyrgios	6	6^{2}	6^{4}

Final
1	Daniil Medvedev	1	4
5	(Poland) Hubert Hurkacz	6	6

=== Top half ===
First round
1	D Medvedev	6	6
(Belgium) D Goffin	3	2
I Ivashka	3	6	7^{7}
WC	(Germany) J-L Struff	6	3	6^{5}
Q	(Netherlands) T Griekspoor	7^{12}	6
(Slovakia) A Molčan	6^{10}	3
(Hungary) M Fucsovics	2	0^{r}
7	(Spain) R Bautista Agut	6	3
3	A Rublev	6^{1}	4
(Georgia (country)) N Basilashvili	7^{7}	6
SE	(Germany) O Otte	7^{7}	6
(Serbia) M Kecmanović	6^{5}	4
(Serbia) L Đere	4
WC	(Germany) H Squire	3^{r}
A Karatsev	7^{7}	1	2
8	K Khachanov	6^{4}	6	6

Second round
1	D Medvedev	7^{7}	6
I Ivashka	6^{4}	3
Q	(Netherlands) T Griekspoor	7^{8}	4	2
7	(Spain) R Bautista Agut	6^{6}	6	6
(Georgia (country)) N Basilashvili	6	0	6^{3}
SE	(Germany) O Otte	4	6	7^{7}
(Serbia) L Đere	6^{4}	4
8	K Khachanov	7^{7}	6

Quarterfinals
1	D Medvedev	6	6
7	(Spain) R Bautista Agut	2	4
SE	(Germany) O Otte	4	7^{7}	6
8	K Khachanov	6	6^{5}	4

Semifinals
1	D Medvedev	7^{7}	6
SE	(Germany) O Otte	6^{3}	3

=== Bottom half ===
First round
5	(Poland) H Hurkacz	6	4	6
Q	(United States) M Cressy	4	6	4
Q	(Moldova) R Albot	7^{7}	6^{4}	5
(France) U Humbert	6^{4}	7^{7}	7
(United States) M McDonald	7^{7}	6
Q	(Switzerland) M-A Hüsler	6^{4}	4
(United States) M Giron	3	7	3
4	(Canada) F Auger-Aliassime	6	5	6
6	(Spain) P Carreño Busta	6	7^{7}
(Denmark) H Rune	3	6^{5}
(United States) S Korda	6	6
(Chile) C Garín	2	3
WC	(Australia) N Kyrgios	6	7
(Germany) D Altmaier	3	5
(France) B Bonzi	6^{1}	6	3
2	(Greece) S Tsitsipas	7^{7}	1	6

Second round
5	(Poland) H Hurkacz	7^{7}	6
(France) U Humbert	6^{5}	3
(United States) M McDonald	6^{7}	1
4	(Canada) F Auger-Aliassime	7^{9}	6
6	(Spain) P Carreño Busta	6	0	6
(United States) S Korda	4	6	3
WC	(Australia) N Kyrgios	5	6	6
2	(Greece) S Tsitsipas	7	2	4

Quarterfinals
5	(Poland) H Hurkacz	7^{7}	7^{7}
4	(Canada) F Auger-Aliassime	6^{2}	6^{4}
6	(Spain) P Carreño Busta	4	2
WC	(Australia) N Kyrgios	6	6

Semifinals
5	(Poland) H Hurkacz	4	7^{7}	7^{7}
WC	(Australia) N Kyrgios	6	6^{2}	6^{4}

== Qualifying ==
=== Seeds ===
1. (Netherlands) Tallon Griekspoor (qualified)
2. (France) Arthur Rinderknech (first round)
3. (Portugal) João Sousa (first round)
4. (United States) Maxime Cressy (qualified)
5. (Czech Republic) Jiří Lehečka (first round)
6. (Germany) Peter Gojowczyk (qualifying competition)
7. (Germany) Yannick Hanfmann (qualifying competition)
8. (Australia) Christopher O'Connell (qualifying competition)

=== Qualifiers ===
1. (Netherlands) Tallon Griekspoor
2. (Switzerland) Marc-Andrea Hüsler
3. (Moldova) Radu Albot
4. (United States) Maxime Cressy

=== Qualifying draw ===
==== First qualifier ====
First round
1	(Netherlands) Tallon Griekspoor	6	0
(Germany) Mats Moraing	3	0^{r}
WC	(Germany) Nicola Kuhn	6^{6}	1
6	(Germany) Peter Gojowczyk	7^{8}	6

Qualifying competition
1	(Netherlands) Tallon Griekspoor	6	6
6	(Germany) Peter Gojowczyk	2	3

==== Second qualifier ====
First round
2	(France) Arthur Rinderknech	6	6^{3}	6^{4}
(Switzerland) Marc-Andrea Hüsler	1	7^{7}	7^{7}
Alt	(Japan) Yūichi Sugita	1	1
8	(Australia) Christopher O'Connell	6	6

Qualifying competition
(Switzerland) Marc-Andrea Hüsler	6	6
8	(Australia) Christopher O'Connell	4	4

==== Third qualifier ====
First round
3	(Portugal) João Sousa	6	6^{6}	2
(Moldova) Radu Albot	1	7^{8}	6
WC	(Switzerland) Dominic Stricker	3	6	6
5	(Czech Republic) Jiří Lehečka	6	1	4

Qualifying competition
(Moldova) Radu Albot	3	6	6
WC	(Switzerland) Dominic Stricker	6	3	2

==== Fourth qualifier ====
First round
4	(United States) Maxime Cressy	6	6
WC	(Germany) Louis Wessels	2	3
Alt	(Chile) Tomás Barrios Vera	3	7^{7}	6^{3}
7	(Germany) Yannick Hanfmann	6	6^{5}	7^{7}

Qualifying competition
4	(United States) Maxime Cressy	6	3	6
7	(Germany) Yannick Hanfmann	3	6	1
