= 2022 BNP Paribas Open – Men's doubles =

Men's doubles
- 2022 BNP Paribas Open

Final
- Champions: (United States) John Isner (United States) Jack Sock
- Runners-up: (Mexico) Santiago González (France) Édouard Roger-Vasselin
- Score: 7–6^{(7–4)}, 6–3

Details
- Draw: 32 (3 WC)
- Seeds: 8

Events
Singles	men	women
Doubles	men	women
- BNP Paribas Open

John Isner and Jack Sock defeated Santiago González and Édouard Roger-Vasselin in the final, 7–6^{(7–4)}, 6–3, to win the men's doubles tennis title at the 2022 Indian Wells Masters. The victory earned Isner his second doubles title at Indian Wells, Sock his third, and the pair's second together overall at the tournament.

John Peers and Filip Polášek were the defending champions, but lost to Marcelo Arévalo and Jean-Julien Rojer in the first round.

Mate Pavić and Joe Salisbury were in contention for the world no. 1 doubles ranking at the beginning of the tournament. Pavić retained the top ranking, despite losing in the first round, after Salisbury lost in the semifinals.

== Seeds ==
1. (Croatia) Nikola Mektić / (Croatia) Mate Pavić (first round)
2. (United States) Rajeev Ram / (United Kingdom) Joe Salisbury (semifinals)
3. (Spain) Marcel Granollers / (Argentina) Horacio Zeballos (second round)
4. (Colombia) Juan Sebastián Cabal / (Colombia) Robert Farah (second round)
5. (Australia) John Peers / (Slovakia) Filip Polášek (first round)
6. (Germany) Tim Pütz / (New Zealand) Michael Venus (second round)
7. (Netherlands) Wesley Koolhof / (United Kingdom) Neal Skupski (quarterfinals)
8. (United Kingdom) Jamie Murray / (Brazil) Bruno Soares (first round)

== Draw ==
Key

- Q = Qualifier
- WC = Wild card
- LL = Lucky loser
- Alt = Alternate
- ITF = ITF entry
- PR = Protected ranking
- SR = Special ranking
- SE = Special exempt
- JE = Junior exempt
- JR = Junior Accelerator Programme entrant
- CO = College Accelerator Programme entrant
- NG = Next Gen Accelerator Program entrant
- w/o = Walkover
- r = Retired
- d = Defaulted

=== Finals ===
Semifinals
WC	(United States) John Isner (United States) Jack Sock	6	6
(Kazakhstan) Andrey Golubev (Germany) Alexander Zverev	3	2
PR	(Mexico) Santiago González (France) Édouard Roger-Vasselin	3	6	[10]
2	(United States) Rajeev Ram (United Kingdom) Joe Salisbury	6	4	[7]

Final
WC	(United States) John Isner (United States) Jack Sock	7^{7}	6
PR	(Mexico) Santiago González (France) Édouard Roger-Vasselin	6^{4}	3

=== Top half ===
First round
1	(Croatia) N Mektić (Croatia) M Pavić	6^{2}	6	[7]
WC	(United States) J Isner (United States) J Sock	7^{7}	3	[10]
(Croatia) I Dodig (Brazil) M Melo	5	6	[2]
WC	(Australia) T Kokkinakis (Australia) N Kyrgios	7	1	[10]
(South Africa) R Klaasen (Japan) B McLachlan	6^{5}	4
WC	(Spain) F López (Greece) S Tsitsipas	7^{7}	6
(Poland) H Hurkacz (Poland) Ł Kubot	2	2
6	(Germany) T Pütz (New Zealand) M Venus	6	6
4	(Colombia) JS Cabal (Colombia) R Farah	7^{10}	6
(United States) S Korda (Italy) J Sinner	6^{8}	2
(Spain) C Alcaraz (Spain) P Carreño Busta	3	7^{7}	[7]
(United States) T Fritz (United States) T Paul	6	6^{5}	[10]
(Kazakhstan) A Golubev (Germany) A Zverev	7	6
(United Kingdom) D Evans; K Khachanov	5	3
(El Salvador) M Arévalo (Netherlands) J-J Rojer	3	6	[11]
5	(Australia) J Peers (Slovakia) F Polášek	6	2	[9]

Second round
WC	(United States) J Isner (United States) J Sock	6	7^{7}
WC	(Australia) T Kokkinakis (Australia) N Kyrgios	3	6^{3}
WC	(Spain) F López (Greece) S Tsitsipas	6	6
6	(Germany) T Pütz (New Zealand) M Venus	4	3
4	(Colombia) JS Cabal (Colombia) R Farah	1	4
(United States) T Fritz (United States) T Paul	6	6
(Kazakhstan) A Golubev (Germany) A Zverev	7^{7}	6
(El Salvador) M Arévalo (Netherlands) J-J Rojer	6^{0}	3

Quarterfinals
WC	(United States) J Isner (United States) J Sock	7	6
WC	(Spain) F López (Greece) S Tsitsipas	5	4
(United States) T Fritz (United States) T Paul	4	6^{3}
(Kazakhstan) A Golubev (Germany) A Zverev	6	7^{7}

Semifinals
WC	(United States) J Isner (United States) J Sock	6	6
(Kazakhstan) A Golubev (Germany) A Zverev	3	2

=== Bottom half ===
First round
8	(United Kingdom) J Murray (Brazil) B Soares	6^{4}	4
(India) R Bopanna (Canada) D Shapovalov	7^{7}	6
PR	(Mexico) S González (France) É Roger-Vasselin	7^{7}	6
(Belgium) S Gillé (Netherlands) M Middelkoop	6^{4}	1
A Karatsev; A Rublev	6^{4}	7^{8}	[10]
(Spain) R Bautista Agut (Spain) A Davidovich Fokina	7^{7}	6^{6}	[5]
(France) N Mahut (France) F Martin	4	4
3	(Spain) M Granollers (Argentina) H Zeballos	6	6
7	(Netherlands) W Koolhof (United Kingdom) N Skupski	6	6
(Italy) S Bolelli (Italy) F Fognini	4	4
(Uruguay) A Behar (Ecuador) G Escobar	1	3
(Argentina) F Delbonis (United Kingdom) C Norrie	6	6
(Argentina) A Molteni (Argentina) D Schwartzman	6	7
(Bosnia and Herzegovina) T Brkić (Serbia) N Ćaćić	3	5
(Germany) K Krawietz (Germany) A Mies	6^{2}	4
2	(United States) R Ram (United Kingdom) J Salisbury	7^{7}	6

Second round
(India) R Bopanna (Canada) D Shapovalov	4	6	[4]
PR	(Mexico) S González (France) É Roger-Vasselin	6	4	[10]
A Karatsev; A Rublev	7^{7}	4	[10]
3	(Spain) M Granollers (Argentina) H Zeballos	6^{2}	6	[4]
7	(Netherlands) W Koolhof (United Kingdom) N Skupski	6	7^{7}
(Argentina) F Delbonis (United Kingdom) C Norrie	3	6^{1}
(Argentina) A Molteni (Argentina) D Schwartzman	3	6^{2}
2	(United States) R Ram (United Kingdom) J Salisbury	6	7^{7}

Quarterfinals
PR	(Mexico) S González (France) É Roger-Vasselin	6	6
A Karatsev; A Rublev	2	4
7	(Netherlands) W Koolhof (United Kingdom) N Skupski	6^{4}	5
2	(United States) R Ram (United Kingdom) J Salisbury	7^{7}	7

Semifinals
PR	(Mexico) S González (France) É Roger-Vasselin	3	6	[10]
2	(United States) R Ram (United Kingdom) J Salisbury	6	4	[7]

== Seeded teams ==
The following are the seeded teams, based on ATP rankings as of March 7, 2022.

Country	Player	Country	Player	Rank	Seed
CRO	Nikola Mektić	CRO	Mate Pavić	3	1
USA	Rajeev Ram	GBR	Joe Salisbury	7	2
ESP	Marcel Granollers	ARG	Horacio Zeballos	11	3
COL	Juan Sebastián Cabal	COL	Robert Farah	18	4
AUS	John Peers	SVK	Filip Polášek	24	5
GER	Tim Pütz	NZL	Michael Venus	26	6
NED	Wesley Koolhof	GBR	Neal Skupski	33	7
GBR	Jamie Murray	BRA	Bruno Soares	38	8

== Other entry information ==
=== Wildcards ===
- (United States) John Isner / (United States) Jack Sock
- (Australia) Thanasi Kokkinakis / (Australia) Nick Kyrgios
- (Spain) Feliciano López / (Greece) Stefanos Tsitsipas

=== Protected ranking ===
- (Mexico) Santiago González / (France) Édouard Roger-Vasselin

=== Withdrawals ===
- (Italy) Simone Bolelli / (Argentina) Máximo González → replaced by (Italy) Simone Bolelli / (Italy) Fabio Fognini
- (United Kingdom) Dan Evans / (Chile) Cristian Garín → replaced by (United Kingdom) Dan Evans / Karen Khachanov
- (Belgium) Sander Gillé / (Belgium) Joran Vliegen → replaced by (Belgium) Sander Gillé / (Netherlands) Matwé Middelkoop
