= 2022 Halle Open – Doubles =

Doubles
- 2022 Halle Open

Final
- Champions: (Spain) Marcel Granollers (Argentina) Horacio Zeballos
- Runners-up: (Germany) Tim Pütz (New Zealand) Michael Venus
- Score: 6–4, 6–7^{(5–7)}, [14–12]

Details
- Draw: 16
- Seeds: 4

Events
Singles	Doubles
- Halle Open

Marcel Granollers and Horacio Zeballos defeated Tim Pütz and Michael Venus in the final, 6–4, 6–7^{(5–7)}, [14–12] to win the doubles tennis title at the 2022 Halle Open. The pair saved two championship points en route to the title.

Kevin Krawietz and Horia Tecău were the defending champions, but Tecău retired from professional tennis at the end of 2021. Krawietz played alongside Andreas Mies but lost in the quarterfinals to Pütz and Venus.

== Seeds ==
1. (Spain) Marcel Granollers / (Argentina) Horacio Zeballos (champions)
2. (El Salvador) Marcelo Arévalo / (Netherlands) Jean-Julien Rojer (semifinals)
3. (Germany) Tim Pütz / (New Zealand) Michael Venus (final)
4. (Croatia) Ivan Dodig / (United States) Austin Krajicek (semifinals)

== Draw ==
Key

- Q = Qualifier
- WC = Wild card
- LL = Lucky loser
- Alt = Alternate
- ITF = ITF entry
- PR = Protected ranking
- SR = Special ranking
- SE = Special exempt
- JE = Junior exempt
- JR = Junior Accelerator Programme entrant
- CO = College Accelerator Programme entrant
- NG = Next Gen Accelerator Program entrant
- w/o = Walkover
- r = Retired
- d = Defaulted

=== Draw ===
First round
1	(Spain) M Granollers (Argentina) H Zeballos	6	6
LL	(Netherlands) T Griekspoor (Slovakia) A Molčan	4	2
(Mexico) S González (Argentina) A Molteni	6^{4}	6	[10]
A Karatsev; K Khachanov	7^{7}	2	[8]
4	(Croatia) I Dodig (United States) A Krajicek	6	4	[10]
(Australia) M Ebden (Australia) M Purcell	3	6	[6]
(Poland) H Hurkacz (United States) S Korda	2	7^{7}	[7]
(Kazakhstan) A Golubev (Argentina) M González	6	6^{2}	[10]
(Germany) K Krawietz (Germany) A Mies	6^{6}	6	[10]
WC	(Germany) D Altmaier (Germany) O Otte	7^{8}	3	[8]
(Italy) S Bolelli (Netherlands) M Middelkoop	6^{3}	4
3	(Germany) T Pütz (New Zealand) M Venus	7^{7}	6
LL	(Germany) Y Hanfmann (Germany) J-L Struff	4	6	[10]
WC	(Jamaica) D Brown (Switzerland) D Stricker	6	3	[2]
(Canada) F Auger-Aliassime; D Medvedev	3	4
2	(El Salvador) M Arévalo (Netherlands) J-J Rojer	6	6

Quarterfinals
1	(Spain) M Granollers (Argentina) H Zeballos	6	6
(Mexico) S González (Argentina) A Molteni	3	4
4	(Croatia) I Dodig (United States) A Krajicek	7^{7}	6
(Kazakhstan) A Golubev (Argentina) M González	6^{3}	2
(Germany) K Krawietz (Germany) A Mies	5	5
3	(Germany) T Pütz (New Zealand) M Venus	7	7
LL	(Germany) Y Hanfmann (Germany) J-L Struff	3	2
2	(El Salvador) M Arévalo (Netherlands) J-J Rojer	6	6

Semifinals
1	(Spain) M Granollers (Argentina) H Zeballos	7^{8}	6^{4}	[10]
4	(Croatia) I Dodig (United States) A Krajicek	6^{6}	7^{7}	[8]
3	(Germany) T Pütz (New Zealand) M Venus	6	6
2	(El Salvador) M Arévalo (Netherlands) J-J Rojer	3	4

Final
1	(Spain) M Granollers (Argentina) H Zeballos	6	6^{5}	[14]
3	(Germany) T Pütz (New Zealand) M Venus	4	7^{7}	[12]

== Qualifying ==
=== Seeds ===
1. (Belgium) Sander Gillé / (Belgium) Joran Vliegen (qualifying competition)
2. (Uruguay) Ariel Behar / (Ecuador) Gonzalo Escobar (qualified)

=== Qualifiers ===
1. (Uruguay) Ariel Behar / (Ecuador) Gonzalo Escobar (withdrew)

=== Lucky losers ===
1. (Netherlands) Tallon Griekspoor / (Slovakia) Alex Molčan
2. (Germany) Yannick Hanfmann / (Germany) Jan-Lennard Struff

=== Qualifying draw ===
First round
1	(Belgium) Sander Gillé (Belgium) Joran Vliegen	7	6
(Netherlands) Tallon Griekspoor (Slovakia) Alex Molčan	5	3
WC	(Germany) Yannick Hanfmann (Germany) Jan-Lennard Struff	3	4
2	(Uruguay) Ariel Behar (Ecuador) Gonzalo Escobar	6	6

Qualifying competition
1	(Belgium) Sander Gillé (Belgium) Joran Vliegen	4	5
2	(Uruguay) Ariel Behar (Ecuador) Gonzalo Escobar	6	7
