= 2022 Erste Bank Open – Singles =

Singles
- 2022 Erste Bank Open

Final
- Champion: Daniil Medvedev
- Runner-up: (Canada) Denis Shapovalov
- Score: 4–6, 6–3, 6–2

Details
- Draw: 32 (4 Q / 3 WC )
- Seeds: 8

Events
Singles	Doubles
- Vienna Open

Daniil Medvedev defeated Denis Shapovalov in the final, 4–6, 6–3, 6–2 to win the singles tennis title at the 2022 Vienna Open.

Alexander Zverev was the reigning champion, but did not compete due to an ongoing ankle injury.

== Seeds ==
1. Daniil Medvedev (champion)
2. (Greece) Stefanos Tsitsipas (second round)
3. Andrey Rublev (second round)
4. (United States) Taylor Fritz (second round)
5. (Poland) Hubert Hurkacz (quarterfinals)
6. (Italy) Jannik Sinner (quarterfinals)
7. (United Kingdom) Cameron Norrie (second round)
8. (Italy) Matteo Berrettini (withdrew)

== Draw ==
Key

- Q = Qualifier
- WC = Wild card
- LL = Lucky loser
- Alt = Alternate
- ITF = ITF entry
- PR = Protected ranking
- SR = Special ranking
- SE = Special exempt
- JE = Junior exempt
- JR = Junior Accelerator Programme entrant
- CO = College Accelerator Programme entrant
- NG = Next Gen Accelerator Program entrant
- w/o = Walkover
- r = Retired
- d = Defaulted

=== Finals ===
Semifinals
1	Daniil Medvedev	6	6
(Bulgaria) Grigor Dimitrov	4	2
(Canada) Denis Shapovalov	7^{7}	6
(Croatia) Borna Ćorić	6^{4}	0

Final
1	Daniil Medvedev	4	6	6
(Canada) Denis Shapovalov	6	3	2

=== Top half ===
First round
1	D Medvedev	6	6
(Georgia (country)) N Basilashvili	2	2
(Austria) D Thiem	2	7^{7}	7^{8}
(United States) T Paul	6	6^{2}	6^{6}
WC	(Austria) F Misolic	3	3
(Argentina) F Cerúndolo	6	6
(Chile) C Garín	3	2
6	(Italy) J Sinner	6	6
3	A Rublev	6	6
(Argentina) D Schwartzman	4	1
(Bulgaria) G Dimitrov	6	6
Q	(Brazil) T Monteiro	3	4
(Netherlands) T Griekspoor	4	2
(United States) M Giron	6	6
LL	(Argentina) P Cachin	6	2	6^{1}
7	(United Kingdom) C Norrie	3	6	7^{7}

Second round
1	D Medvedev	6	6
(Austria) D Thiem	3	3
(Argentina) F Cerúndolo	5	3
6	(Italy) J Sinner	7	6
3	A Rublev	3	4
(Bulgaria) G Dimitrov	6	6
(United States) M Giron	6	6
7	(United Kingdom) C Norrie	3	4

Quarterfinals
1	D Medvedev	6	6
6	(Italy) J Sinner	4	2
(Bulgaria) G Dimitrov	6	4	6
(United States) M Giron	3	6	4

Semifinals
1	D Medvedev	6	6
(Bulgaria) G Dimitrov	4	2

=== Bottom half ===
First round
LL	(Germany) O Otte	4	6^{3}
(United Kingdom) D Evans	6	7^{7}
K Khachanov	7^{7}	7
Q	(United States) JJ Wolf	6^{4}	5
WC	(Austria) J Rodionov	4	4
(Canada) D Shapovalov	6	6
Q	(Japan) Y Nishioka	7^{7}	6^{7}	3
4	(United States) T Fritz	6^{4}	7^{9}	6
5	(Poland) H Hurkacz	7^{11}	3	6
(United States) F Tiafoe	6^{9}	6	3
(Italy) L Sonego	2	3
SE	(Finland) E Ruusuvuori	6	6
Q	(France) Q Halys	6	5	3
(Croatia) B Ćorić	3	7	6
WC	(Austria) D Novak	6^{2}	2
2	(Greece) S Tsitsipas	7^{7}	6

Second round
(United Kingdom) D Evans	6	6
K Khachanov	2	2
(Canada) D Shapovalov	6	4	6
4	(United States) T Fritz	1	6	3
5	(Poland) H Hurkacz	7	4	6
SE	(Finland) E Ruusuvuori	5	6	3
(Croatia) B Ćorić	4	6	7^{7}
2	(Greece) S Tsitsipas	6	4	6^{4}

Quarterfinals
(United Kingdom) D Evans	3	3
(Canada) D Shapovalov	6	6
5	(Poland) H Hurkacz	4	7^{7}	6^{5}
(Croatia) B Ćorić	6	6^{2}	7^{7}

Semifinals
(Canada) D Shapovalov	7^{7}	6
(Croatia) B Ćorić	6^{4}	0

== Qualifying ==
=== Seeds ===
1. (Japan) Yoshihito Nishioka (qualified)
2. (Germany) Oscar Otte (qualifying competition, lucky loser)
3. (United States) J. J. Wolf (qualified)
4. (Argentina) Pedro Cachin (qualifying competition, lucky loser)
5. (Brazil) Thiago Monteiro (qualified)
6. (France) Corentin Moutet (first round)
7. (France) Quentin Halys (qualified)
8. (Portugal) João Sousa (qualifying competition)

=== Qualifiers ===
1. (Japan) Yoshihito Nishioka
2. (Brazil) Thiago Monteiro
3. (United States) J. J. Wolf
4. (France) Quentin Halys

=== Lucky losers ===
1. (Argentina) Pedro Cachin
2. (Germany) Oscar Otte

=== Qualifying draw ===
==== First qualifier ====
First round
1	(Japan) Yoshihito Nishioka	6	7^{7}
Ilya Ivashka	2	6^{4}
WC	(Austria) Alexander Erler	6^{5}	5
8	(Portugal) João Sousa	7^{7}	7

Qualifying competition
1	(Japan) Yoshihito Nishioka	6	6
8	(Portugal) João Sousa	4	4

==== Second qualifier ====
First round
2	(Germany) Oscar Otte	6	6
(Czech Republic) Jiří Lehečka	3	4
Alt	(Serbia) Dušan Lajović	4	2
5	(Brazil) Thiago Monteiro	6	6

Qualifying competition
2	(Germany) Oscar Otte	6^{4}	6	4
5	(Brazil) Thiago Monteiro	7^{7}	4	6

==== Third qualifier ====
First round
3	(United States) J. J. Wolf	6	3	6
WC	(Austria) Lucas Miedler	3	6	2
Alt	(Hungary) Márton Fucsovics	7	6
6	(France) Corentin Moutet	5	2

Qualifying competition
3	(United States) J. J. Wolf	7	3	6
Alt	(Hungary) Márton Fucsovics	5	6	4

==== Fourth qualifier ====
First round
4	(Argentina) Pedro Cachin	6	3	7^{7}
(Chile) Alejandro Tabilo	2	6	6^{2}
WC	(Austria) Lukas Neumayer	1	4
7	(France) Quentin Halys	6	6

Qualifying competition
4	(Argentina) Pedro Cachin	6^{6}	6	3
7	(France) Quentin Halys	7^{8}	3	6
