= 2022 Carlos Alcaraz tennis season =

Tennis player season

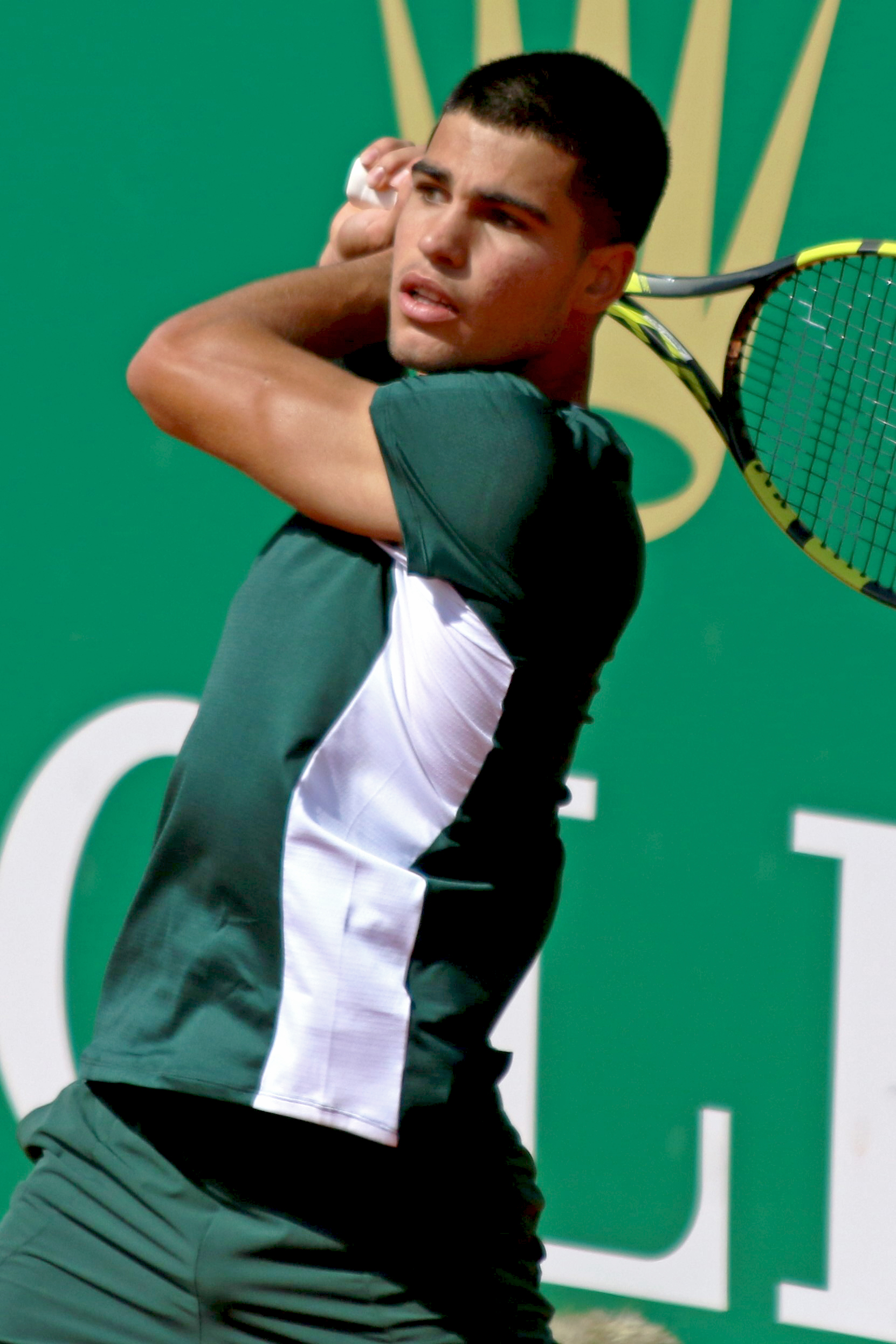
- Alcaraz at the 2022 Monte-Carlo Masters
- Full name: Carlos Alcaraz Garfia
- Country: Spain
- Calendar prize money: $10,102,330

Singles
- Season record: 57–13 (81.4%)
- Calendar titles: 5
- Year-end ranking: No. 1
- Ranking change from previous year: ▲31

Grand Slam & significant results
- Australian Open: 3R
- French Open: QF
- Wimbledon: 4R
- US Open: W

Doubles
- Season record: 2–2
- Year-end ranking: No. 560
- Ranking change from previous year: New entry

Injuries
- Injuries: Internal tear in left abdomen (November 4)

The 2022 Carlos Alcaraz tennis season officially began on 17 January 2022, with the start of the Australian Open in Melbourne. This was the breakout year for Carlos Alcaraz who won his first Grand Slam tournament and reached No. 1 in the world rankings, both at age 19.

During this season, Alcaraz:

- Won his first and second ATP 500 events
- Became the youngest winner of an ATP 500 event in history
- Won his first and second Masters 1000 events
- Became the youngest winner of the Miami Open in history
- Became the youngest winner of the Madrid Open in history
- Won his first major title at the US Open
- Became the first man born in the 2000s to win a major singles title
- Clinched the world No. 1 ranking for the first time, holding it for 16 weeks
- Became the youngest ATP world No. 1 in history

== Yearly summary ==
=== Early hard court season ===
==== Australian Open ====
Alcaraz received direct entry into the main draw of the Australian Open for the first time. This was the first major he entered as a seed, ranked world No. 31. He reached the third round, where he was defeated in a fifth set tiebreak by Matteo Berrettini.

=== Early clay season ===
==== Rio Open ====
Alcaraz entered the Rio Open, where he had made his ATP Tour debut two years earlier. He was now seventh seed. Alcaraz avenged his Australian Open exit by defeating Berrettini in the quarterfinals. He made it to the final, where he defeated Diego Schwartzman to claim his second ATP title. He became the youngest winner of an ATP 500 event since the category was created in 2009. Alcaraz entered the top 20 of the ATP rankings on 21 February 2022.

Alcaraz then withdrew from the Mexican Open, citing discomfort in his right elbow.

==== Davis Cup ====
In March, Alcaraz joined the Spanish Davis Cup team for the first time in his career for a tie against Romania. Alcaraz defeated Marius Copil in straight sets, helping to book Spain's place in the Finals.

=== Sunshine Double tournaments ===
==== Indian Wells ====
Alcaraz arrived in North America to play Indian Wells for the second time in his career. He defeated Gaël Monfils to reach his first Masters quarterfinal, and Cameron Norrie to reach his first Masters semifinal. Alcaraz had been storming through the draw without dropping a set; however, he lost the semifinal in three sets to his compatriot Rafael Nadal. This was their second out of three career meetings.

==== Miami Open ====
Alcaraz proceeded to the Miami Open, where he was seeded fourteenth. In the fourth round he defeated world No. 3 Stefanos Tsitsipas, followed by defending champion Hubert Hurkacz in the semifinals. In the final, Alcaraz defeated Casper Ruud in straight sets to win his first Masters 1000 title. He was the first Spaniard to win the tournament. At 18 years and 333 days old, he was also the youngest men's singles titlist in Miami Open history, and the youngest Masters champion since Rafael Nadal at the 2005 Monte Carlo Masters.

=== Clay season ===
==== Monte-Carlo Masters ====
Now the world No. 11, Alcaraz received a bye into the second round of the Monte-Carlo Masters. He was upset in windy conditions by the unseeded Sebastian Korda in three sets. Ironically, this was the last match Alcaraz would play at Monte-Carlo until winning his first title there in 2025.

==== Barcelona Open ====
Alcaraz bounced back at the Barcelona Open, where he defeated compatriot Pablo Carreño Busta to win his fourth career title. By winning his quarterfinal match against Stefanos Tsitsipas, Alcaraz broke into the top ten of the world rankings for the first time, on 25 April. He became the 20th teenager to break into the top 10 overall since rankings were established in 1973, and the youngest since Rafael Nadal on 25 April 2005, exactly 17 years earlier.

==== Madrid Open ====
Alcaraz then entered the Madrid Open as seventh seed. A day after his 19th birthday, he defeated 5-time Madrid champion, world No. 4 and third seed Rafael Nadal in the quarterfinals. This was Alcaraz's first victory against Nadal, and their final tour-level meeting. The following day, Alcaraz faced world No. 1 Novak Djokovic in their first tour level meeting. After three hours and thirty-six minutes, Alcaraz stunned the tennis world by prevailing in a tight third set tiebreak (6–7^{(5–7)}, 7–5, 7–6^{(7–5)}). This match was later named the ATP Match of the Year. Alcaraz became the youngest player to win a match against a world No. 1 since 2004, and the only player ever to defeat Nadal and Djokovic back-to-back on clay. In the final, Alcaraz dismantled defending champion and world No. 3 Alexander Zverev in an hour and four minutes, thereby having defeated the tournament's top three seeds in three consecutive matches. He became the youngest champion in the tournament's history. Alcaraz climbed to a career-high of world No. 6 in the rankings on 9 May 2022.

Alcaraz then withdrew from the Italian Open due to an ankle injury.

==== French Open ====
Alcaraz made his seeded debut at the French Open. Having won two of the tour's biggest titles on clay coming into the tournament, he was widely projected to be one of the favorites for the title. In the first round, he defeated Juan Ignacio Londero in straight sets. The second round was more complicated: Alcaraz was forced to save a match point in a second round five-setter against Albert Ramos Viñolas. He defeated Sebastian Korda and Karen Khachanov in straight sets. He then lost decisively to Alexander Zverev in the second major quarterfinal of his career.

=== Grass season ===
==== Wimbledon ====
Alcaraz did not play a warm-up tournament before Wimbledon, where he was competing for the second time in his career. In the first round, he beat Jan-Lennard Struff in a close five setter. He then defeated Tallon Griekspoor and Oscar Otte in straight sets, to reach the fourth round for the first time at Wimbledon. He lost there in four sets to world No. 13 and future rival Jannik Sinner.

=== Late clay season ===
==== Hamburg Open ====
Alcaraz returned to clay courts after Wimbledon. He reached the finals of the Hamburg Open, where he suffered his first defeat in a tour-level final to Lorenzo Musetti. Following this tournament, on 25 July 2022, Alcaraz reached a new career high of world No. 5. He became the youngest male player to enter the top 5 since Nadal in 2005.

==== Croatia Open ====
Alcaraz then returned to Umag as the defending champion, where he suffered a consecutive defeat in a final, this time to Jannik Sinner. This nevertheless resulted in another jump in the rankings to world No. 4 on 1 August.

=== North American hard court swing ===
==== Canadian Open ====
Playing the Canadian Open for the first time in his career and seeded second, Alcaraz received a bye into the second round. He was upset there by Tommy Paul in a tight three-setter, 6–7^{(7–4)}, 7–6^{(8–7)}, 6–3. The match lasted three hours and twenty minutes.

==== Cincinnati Open ====
Alcaraz reached the quarterfinals of the Cincinnati Open, where he lost in three sets to Cameron Norrie.

==== US Open ====
Alcaraz then entered the US Open for the second time in his career. Prior to the tournament, Alcaraz, Rafael Nadal, Casper Ruud, Daniil Medvedev, and Stefanos Tsitsipas were all in contention to take over the world No. 1 singles ranking. Alcaraz made it through the first three rounds without dropping a set. In the fourth round, he defeated former champion Marin Čilić in five sets. In the quarterfinals, Alcaraz saved a match point in the fourth set before recovering to win in five sets against Jannik Sinner. The match lasted five hours and fifteen minutes, and recorded the latest finish in the history of the tournament at 2:50AM. Alcaraz then played a third consecutive five-setter in the semifinals to defeat Frances Tiafoe. He then faced 5th seed Casper Ruud in a final where both players were in contention for the world No. 1 ranking. Alcaraz won the match in four sets to seize his first major title.

Alcaraz became the youngest No. 1 in the history of the ATP Rankings at the age of 19 years, 4 months and 6 days, breaking Lleyton Hewitt's record, and the second youngest all-time behind Lew Hoad. He also became the youngest men's major champion since Nadal at the 2005 French Open, the youngest US Open champion since Pete Sampras in 1990, and the first man born in the 2000s to win a major singles title. At 23 hours and 39 minutes of play duration across his seven matches, Alcaraz spent the longest time on court in major history (a record later broken by Medvedev at the 2024 Australian Open).

=== Indoor hard court season ===
==== Davis Cup ====
Alcaraz reunited with the Spanish team for the group stage of the Davis Cup Finals. He lost his first match as world No. 1 to Canada's Félix Auger-Aliassime in three sets. He then defeated South Korea's Kwon Soon-woo in straight sets.

==== Astana Open ====
Alcaraz then entered the Astana Open, where he lost in the first round to lucky loser David Goffin in straight sets.

==== Swiss Indoors ====
At the Swiss Indoors in Basel, Alcaraz reached the semifinals, where he lost once again to eventual champion Auger-Aliassime.

==== Paris Masters ====
At the Paris Masters, Alcaraz retired in the quarterfinals down a set against eventual champion Holger Rune due to an internal tear in his left abdominal wall. Due to this injury, Alcaraz withdrew from both the Davis Cup Finals and his first chance at playing the ATP Finals, bringing his season to a close. Alcaraz, at the age of 19 years and 214 days, ended the year as youngest and first teenage world No. 1 in the ATP era, and second youngest of all-time behind Hoad.

== All matches ==
This table chronicles all the matches of Carlos Alcaraz in 2022.

Key
W	F	SF	QF	#R	RR	Q#	P#	DNQ	A	Z#	PO	G	S	B	NMS	NTI	P	NH

(W) winner; (F) finalist; (SF) semifinalist; (QF) quarterfinalist; (#R) rounds 4, 3, 2, 1; (RR) round-robin stage; (Q#) qualification round; (P#) preliminary round; (DNQ) did not qualify; (A) absent; (Z#) Davis/Fed Cup Zonal Group (with number indication) or (PO) play-off; (G) gold, (S) silver or (B) bronze Olympic/Paralympic medal; (NMS) not a Masters tournament; (NTI) not a Tier I tournament; (P) postponed; (NH) not held; (SR) strike rate (events won / competed); (W–L) win–loss record.
To avoid confusion and double counting, these charts are updated at the conclusion of a tournament or when the player's participation has ended.

=== Singles matches ===
Tournament	Match	Round	Opponent (seed or key)	Rank	Result	Score
Australian Open; Melbourne, Australia; Grand Slam tournament Hard, outdoor 17 – 30 January 2022
Australian Open; Melbourne, Australia; Grand Slam tournament Hard, outdoor 17 – 30 January 2022	1 / 52	1R	(Chile) Alejandro Tabilo (Q)	135	Win	6–2, 6–2, 6–3
Australian Open; Melbourne, Australia; Grand Slam tournament Hard, outdoor 17 – 30 January 2022	2 / 53	2R	(Serbia) Dušan Lajović	39	Win	6–2, 6–1, 7–5
Australian Open; Melbourne, Australia; Grand Slam tournament Hard, outdoor 17 – 30 January 2022	3 / 54	3R	(Italy) Matteo Berrettini (7)	7	Loss	2–6, 6–7^{(3–7)}, 6–4, 6–2, 6–7^{(5–10)}
Rio Open; Rio de Janeiro, Brazil; ATP 500; Clay, outdoor 14 – 20 February 2022
Rio Open; Rio de Janeiro, Brazil; ATP 500; Clay, outdoor 14 – 20 February 2022	4 / 55	1R	(Spain) Jaume Munar	89	Win	2–6, 6–2, 6–1
Rio Open; Rio de Janeiro, Brazil; ATP 500; Clay, outdoor 14 – 20 February 2022	5 / 56	2R	(Argentina) Federico Delbonis	37	Win	6–4, 7–6^{(7–1)}
Rio Open; Rio de Janeiro, Brazil; ATP 500; Clay, outdoor 14 – 20 February 2022	6 / 57	QF	(Italy) Matteo Berrettini (1)	6	Win	6–2, 2–6, 6–2
Rio Open; Rio de Janeiro, Brazil; ATP 500; Clay, outdoor 14 – 20 February 2022	7 / 58	SF	(Italy) Fabio Fognini	38	Win	6–2, 7–5
Rio Open; Rio de Janeiro, Brazil; ATP 500; Clay, outdoor 14 – 20 February 2022	8 / 59	W	(Argentina) Diego Schwartzman (3)	14	Win (1)	6–4, 6–2
Davis Cup qualifying round Spain vs Romania; Marbella, Spain; Davis Cup; Clay, outdoor 28 February – 5 March 2022
Davis Cup qualifying round Spain vs Romania; Marbella, Spain; Davis Cup; Clay, outdoor 28 February – 5 March 2022	9 / 60	RR	(Romania) Marius Copil	261	Win	6–4, 6–3
Indian Wells Masters; Indian Wells, United States; ATP 1000; Hard, outdoor 10 – 20 March 2022
Indian Wells Masters; Indian Wells, United States; ATP 1000; Hard, outdoor 10 – 20 March 2022	–	1R	Bye			
Indian Wells Masters; Indian Wells, United States; ATP 1000; Hard, outdoor 10 – 20 March 2022	10 / 61	2R	(United States) Mackenzie McDonald	59	Win	6–3, 6–3
Indian Wells Masters; Indian Wells, United States; ATP 1000; Hard, outdoor 10 – 20 March 2022	11 / 62	3R	(Spain) Roberto Bautista Agut (15)	15	Win	6–2, 6–0
Indian Wells Masters; Indian Wells, United States; ATP 1000; Hard, outdoor 10 – 20 March 2022	12 / 63	4R	(France) Gaël Monfils (26)	28	Win	7–5, 6–1
Indian Wells Masters; Indian Wells, United States; ATP 1000; Hard, outdoor 10 – 20 March 2022	13 / 64	QF	(United Kingdom) Cameron Norrie (12)	12	Win	6–4, 6–3
Indian Wells Masters; Indian Wells, United States; ATP 1000; Hard, outdoor 10 – 20 March 2022	14 / 65	SF	(Spain) Rafael Nadal (4)	4	Loss	4–6, 6–4, 3–6
Miami Open; Miami Gardens, United States; ATP 1000; Hard, outdoor 21 – 3 April 2022
Miami Open; Miami Gardens, United States; ATP 1000; Hard, outdoor 21 – 3 April 2022	–	1R	Bye			
Miami Open; Miami Gardens, United States; ATP 1000; Hard, outdoor 21 – 3 April 2022	15 / 66	2R	(Hungary) Márton Fucsovics	55	Win	6–3, 6–2
Miami Open; Miami Gardens, United States; ATP 1000; Hard, outdoor 21 – 3 April 2022	16 / 67	3R	(Croatia) Marin Čilić	23	Win	6–4, 6–4
Miami Open; Miami Gardens, United States; ATP 1000; Hard, outdoor 21 – 3 April 2022	17 / 68	4R	(Greece) Stefanos Tsitsipas (3)	5	Win	7–5, 6–3
Miami Open; Miami Gardens, United States; ATP 1000; Hard, outdoor 21 – 3 April 2022	18 / 69	QF	(Serbia) Miomir Kecmanović	48	Win	6–7^{(5–7)}, 6–3, 7–6^{(7–5)}
Miami Open; Miami Gardens, United States; ATP 1000; Hard, outdoor 21 – 3 April 2022	19 / 70	SF	(Poland) Hubert Hurkacz (8)	10	Win	7–6^{(7–5)}, 7–6^{(7–2)}
Miami Open; Miami Gardens, United States; ATP 1000; Hard, outdoor 21 – 3 April 2022	20 / 71	W	(Norway) Casper Ruud (6)	8	Win (2)	7–5, 6–4
Monte-Carlo Masters; Monte Carlo, Monaco; ATP 1000; Clay, outdoor 10 – 17 April 2022
Monte-Carlo Masters; Monte Carlo, Monaco; ATP 1000; Clay, outdoor 10 – 17 April 2022	–	1R	Bye			
Monte-Carlo Masters; Monte Carlo, Monaco; ATP 1000; Clay, outdoor 10 – 17 April 2022	21 / 72	2R	(United States) Sebastian Korda	42	Loss	6–7^{(2–7)}, 7–6^{(7–5)}, 3–6
Barcelona Open; Barcelona, Spain; ATP 500; Clay, outdoor 18 – 24 April 2022
Barcelona Open; Barcelona, Spain; ATP 500; Clay, outdoor 18 – 24 April 2022	–	1R	Bye			
Barcelona Open; Barcelona, Spain; ATP 500; Clay, outdoor 18 – 24 April 2022	22 / 73	2R	(South Korea) Kwon Soon-woo	71	Win	6–1, 2–6, 6–2
Barcelona Open; Barcelona, Spain; ATP 500; Clay, outdoor 18 – 24 April 2022	23 / 74	3R	(Spain) Jaume Munar (WC)	101	Win	6–3, 6–3
Barcelona Open; Barcelona, Spain; ATP 500; Clay, outdoor 18 – 24 April 2022	24 / 75	QF	(Greece) Stefanos Tsitsipas (1)	5	Win	6–4, 5–7, 6–2
Barcelona Open; Barcelona, Spain; ATP 500; Clay, outdoor 18 – 24 April 2022	25 / 76	SF	(Australia) Alex de Minaur (10)	25	Win	6–7^{(4–7)}, 7–6^{(7–4)}, 6–4
Barcelona Open; Barcelona, Spain; ATP 500; Clay, outdoor 18 – 24 April 2022	26 / 77	W	(Spain) Pablo Carreño Busta (8)	19	Win (3)	6–3, 6–2
Madrid Open; Madrid, Spain; ATP 1000; Clay, outdoor 1 – 8 May 2022
Madrid Open; Madrid, Spain; ATP 1000; Clay, outdoor 1 – 8 May 2022	–	1R	Bye			
Madrid Open; Madrid, Spain; ATP 1000; Clay, outdoor 1 – 8 May 2022	27 / 78	2R	(Georgia (country)) Nikoloz Basilashvili	27	Win	6–3, 7–5
Madrid Open; Madrid, Spain; ATP 1000; Clay, outdoor 1 – 8 May 2022	28 / 79	3R	(United Kingdom) Cameron Norrie (9)	11	Win	6–4, 6–7^{(4–7)}, 6–3
Madrid Open; Madrid, Spain; ATP 1000; Clay, outdoor 1 – 8 May 2022	29 / 80	QF	(Spain) Rafael Nadal (3)	4	Win	6–2, 1–6, 6–3
Madrid Open; Madrid, Spain; ATP 1000; Clay, outdoor 1 – 8 May 2022	30 / 81	SF	(Serbia) Novak Djokovic (1)	1	Win	6–7^{(5–7)}, 7–5, 7–6^{(7–5)}
Madrid Open; Madrid, Spain; ATP 1000; Clay, outdoor 1 – 8 May 2022	31 / 82	W	(Germany) Alexander Zverev (2)	3	Win (4)	6–3, 6–1
French Open; Paris, France; Grand Slam tournament Clay, outdoor 22 May – 5 June 2022
French Open; Paris, France; Grand Slam tournament Clay, outdoor 22 May – 5 June 2022	32 / 83	1R	(Argentina) Juan Ignacio Londero (LL)	141	Win	6–4, 6–2, 6–0
French Open; Paris, France; Grand Slam tournament Clay, outdoor 22 May – 5 June 2022	33 / 84	2R	(Spain) Albert Ramos Viñolas	44	Win	6–1, 6–7^{(7–9)}, 5–7, 7–6^{(7–2)}, 6–4
French Open; Paris, France; Grand Slam tournament Clay, outdoor 22 May – 5 June 2022	34 / 85	3R	(United States) Sebastian Korda (27)	30	Win	6–4, 6–4, 6–2
French Open; Paris, France; Grand Slam tournament Clay, outdoor 22 May – 5 June 2022	35 / 86	4R	Karen Khachanov (21)	25	Win	6–1, 6–4, 6–4
French Open; Paris, France; Grand Slam tournament Clay, outdoor 22 May – 5 June 2022	36 / 87	QF	(Germany) Alexander Zverev (2)	3	Loss	4–6, 4–6, 6–4, 6–7^{(7–9)}
Wimbledon Championships; London, United Kingdom; Grand Slam tournament Grass, outdoor 27 June – 10 July 2022
Wimbledon Championships; London, United Kingdom; Grand Slam tournament Grass, outdoor 27 June – 10 July 2022	37 / 88	1R	(Germany) Jan-Lennard Struff	155	Win	4–6, 7–5, 4–6, 7–6^{(7–3)}, 6–4
Wimbledon Championships; London, United Kingdom; Grand Slam tournament Grass, outdoor 27 June – 10 July 2022	38 / 89	2R	(Netherlands) Tallon Griekspoor	53	Win	6–4, 7–6^{(7–0)}, 6–3
Wimbledon Championships; London, United Kingdom; Grand Slam tournament Grass, outdoor 27 June – 10 July 2022	39 / 90	3R	(Germany) Oscar Otte (32)	36	Win	6–3, 6–1, 6–2
Wimbledon Championships; London, United Kingdom; Grand Slam tournament Grass, outdoor 27 June – 10 July 2022	40 / 91	4R	(Italy) Jannik Sinner (10)	13	Loss	1–6, 4–6, 7–6^{(10–8)}, 3–6
Hamburg Open; Hamburg , Germany; ATP 500; Clay, outdoor 17 – 24 July 2022
Hamburg Open; Hamburg , Germany; ATP 500; Clay, outdoor 17 – 24 July 2022	41 / 92	1R	(Germany) Nicola Kuhn (WC)	259	Win	3–6, 6–1, 7–6^{(7–3)}
Hamburg Open; Hamburg , Germany; ATP 500; Clay, outdoor 17 – 24 July 2022	42 / 93	2R	(Serbia) Filip Krajinović	43	Win	7–6^{(7–4)}, 6–3
Hamburg Open; Hamburg , Germany; ATP 500; Clay, outdoor 17 – 24 July 2022	43 / 94	QF	Karen Khachanov (7)	26	Win	6–0, 6–2
Hamburg Open; Hamburg , Germany; ATP 500; Clay, outdoor 17 – 24 July 2022	44 / 95	SF	(Slovakia) Alex Molčan	48	Win	7–6^{(7–2)}, 6–1
Hamburg Open; Hamburg , Germany; ATP 500; Clay, outdoor 17 – 24 July 2022	45 / 96	F	(Italy) Lorenzo Musetti	62	Loss	4–6, 7–6^{(8–6)}, 4–6
Croatia Open; Umag, Croatia; ATP 250; Clay, outdoor 25 – 31 July 2022
Croatia Open; Umag, Croatia; ATP 250; Clay, outdoor 25 – 31 July 2022	–	1R	Bye			
Croatia Open; Umag, Croatia; ATP 250; Clay, outdoor 25 – 31 July 2022	46 / 97	2R	(Slovakia) Norbert Gombos (LL)	117	Win	6–2, 6–3
Croatia Open; Umag, Croatia; ATP 250; Clay, outdoor 25 – 31 July 2022	47 / 98	QF	(Argentina) Facundo Bagnis	120	Win	6–0, 6–4
Croatia Open; Umag, Croatia; ATP 250; Clay, outdoor 25 – 31 July 2022	48 / 99	SF	(Italy) Giulio Zeppieri (Q)	168	Win	7–5, 4–6, 6–3
Croatia Open; Umag, Croatia; ATP 250; Clay, outdoor 25 – 31 July 2022	49 / 100	F	(Italy) Jannik Sinner (2)	10	Loss	7–6^{(7–5)}, 1–6, 1–6
Canadian Open; Toronto, Canada; ATP 1000; Hard, outdoor 8 – 14 August 2022
Canadian Open; Toronto, Canada; ATP 1000; Hard, outdoor 8 – 14 August 2022	–	1R	Bye			
Canadian Open; Toronto, Canada; ATP 1000; Hard, outdoor 8 – 14 August 2022	50 / 101	2R	(United States) Tommy Paul	34	Loss	7–6^{(7–4)}, 6–7^{(7–9)}, 3–6
Cincinnati Masters; Cincinnati, United States; ATP 1000; Hard, outdoor 14 – 21 August 2022
Cincinnati Masters; Cincinnati, United States; ATP 1000; Hard, outdoor 14 – 21 August 2022	–	1R	Bye			
Cincinnati Masters; Cincinnati, United States; ATP 1000; Hard, outdoor 14 – 21 August 2022	51 / 102	2R	(United States) Mackenzie McDonald (WC)	72	Win	6–3, 6–2
Cincinnati Masters; Cincinnati, United States; ATP 1000; Hard, outdoor 14 – 21 August 2022	52 / 103	3R	(Croatia) Marin Čilić (14)	17	Win	7–6^{(7–4)}, 6–1
Cincinnati Masters; Cincinnati, United States; ATP 1000; Hard, outdoor 14 – 21 August 2022	53 / 104	QF	(United Kingdom) Cameron Norrie (9)	11	Loss	6–7^{(4–7)}, 7–6^{(7–4)}, 4–6
US Open; New York City, United States; Grand Slam tournament Hard, outdoor 29 August – 11 September 2022
US Open; New York City, United States; Grand Slam tournament Hard, outdoor 29 August – 11 September 2022	54 / 105	1R	(Argentina) Sebastián Báez	37	Win	7–5, 7–5, 2–0r.
US Open; New York City, United States; Grand Slam tournament Hard, outdoor 29 August – 11 September 2022	55 / 106	2R	(Argentina) Federico Coria	78	Win	6–2, 6–1, 7–5
US Open; New York City, United States; Grand Slam tournament Hard, outdoor 29 August – 11 September 2022	56 / 107	3R	(United States) Jenson Brooksby	43	Win	6–3, 6–3, 6–3
US Open; New York City, United States; Grand Slam tournament Hard, outdoor 29 August – 11 September 2022	57 / 108	4R	(Croatia) Marin Čilić (15)	17	Win	6–4, 3–6, 6–4, 4–6, 6–3
US Open; New York City, United States; Grand Slam tournament Hard, outdoor 29 August – 11 September 2022	58 / 109	QF	(Italy) Jannik Sinner (11)	13	Win	6–3, 6–7^{(7–9)}, 6–7^{(0–7)}, 7–5, 6–3
US Open; New York City, United States; Grand Slam tournament Hard, outdoor 29 August – 11 September 2022	59 / 110	SF	(United States) Frances Tiafoe (22)	26	Win	6–7^{(6–8)}, 6–3, 6–1, 6–7^{(5–7)}, 6–3
US Open; New York City, United States; Grand Slam tournament Hard, outdoor 29 August – 11 September 2022	60 / 111	W	(Norway) Casper Ruud (5)	7	Win (5)	6–4, 2–6, 7–6^{(7–1)}, 6–3
Davis Cup Finals; Group B Valencia, Spain; Davis Cup; Hard, indoor 13 – 18 September 2022
Davis Cup Finals; Group B Valencia, Spain; Davis Cup; Hard, indoor 13 – 18 September 2022	61 / 112	RR	(Canada) Félix Auger-Aliassime	13	Loss	7–6^{(7–3)}, 4–6, 2–6
Davis Cup Finals; Group B Valencia, Spain; Davis Cup; Hard, indoor 13 – 18 September 2022	62 / 113	RR	(South Korea) Kwon Soon-woo	74	Win	6–4, 7–6^{(7–1)}
Astana Open; Astana, Kazakhstan; ATP 500; Hard, indoor 3 – 9 October 2022
Astana Open; Astana, Kazakhstan; ATP 500; Hard, indoor 3 – 9 October 2022	63 / 114	1R	(Belgium) David Goffin (LL)	66	Loss	5–7, 3–6
Swiss Indoors; Basel, Switzerland; ATP 500; Hard, indoor 24 – 30 October 2022
Swiss Indoors; Basel, Switzerland; ATP 500; Hard, indoor 24 – 30 October 2022	64 / 115	1R	(United Kingdom) Jack Draper	45	Win	3–6, 6–2, 7–5
Swiss Indoors; Basel, Switzerland; ATP 500; Hard, indoor 24 – 30 October 2022	65 / 116	2R	(Netherlands) Botic van de Zandschulp	35	Win	6–4, 6–2
Swiss Indoors; Basel, Switzerland; ATP 500; Hard, indoor 24 – 30 October 2022	66 / 117	QF	(Spain) Pablo Carreño Busta (5)	15	Win	6–3, 6–4
Swiss Indoors; Basel, Switzerland; ATP 500; Hard, indoor 24 – 30 October 2022	67 / 118	SF	(Canada) Félix Auger-Aliassime (3)	9	Loss	3–6, 2–6
Paris Masters; Paris, France; ATP 1000; Hard, indoor 31 October – 6 November 2022
Paris Masters; Paris, France; ATP 1000; Hard, indoor 31 October – 6 November 2022	–	1R	Bye			
Paris Masters; Paris, France; ATP 1000; Hard, indoor 31 October – 6 November 2022	68 / 119	2R	(Japan) Yoshihito Nishioka	38	Win	6–4, 6–4
Paris Masters; Paris, France; ATP 1000; Hard, indoor 31 October – 6 November 2022	69 / 120	3R	(Bulgaria) Grigor Dimitrov	28	Win	6–1, 6–3
Paris Masters; Paris, France; ATP 1000; Hard, indoor 31 October – 6 November 2022	70 / 121	QF	(Denmark) Holger Rune	18	Loss	3–6, 6–6^{(1–3)} ret.
ATP Finals; Turin, Italy; ATP Finals; Hard, indoor 13 – 20 November 2022
ATP Finals; Turin, Italy; ATP Finals; Hard, indoor 13 – 20 November 2022	Withdrew					

== Schedule ==
Per Carlos Alcaraz, this is his current 2022 schedule (subject to change).

=== Singles schedule ===
Date	Tournament	Location	Tier	Surface	Prev. result	Prev. points	New points	Result
17 January 2022– 30 January 2022	Australian Open	Melbourne (AUS)	Grand Slam	Hard	2R	45	90	Third round (lost to (Italy) Matteo Berrettini, 2–6, 6–7^{(3–7)}, 6–4, 6–2, 6–7^{(5–10)})
14 February 2022– 20 February 2022	Rio Open	Rio de Janeiro (BRA)	500 Series	Clay	2R	45	500	Champion (defeated (Argentina) Diego Schwartzman, 6–4, 6–2)
10 March 2022– 20 March 2022	Indian Wells Masters	Indian Wells (USA)	Masters 1000	Hard	2R	45	360	Semifinals (lost to (Spain) Rafael Nadal, 4–6, 6–4, 3–6)
23 March 2022– 3 April 2022	Miami Open	Miami Gardens (USA)	Masters 1000	Hard	1R	10	1000	Champion (defeated (Norway) Casper Ruud, 7–5, 6–4)
10 April 2022– 17 April 2022	Monte-Carlo Masters	Roquebrune-Cap-Martin (FRA)	Masters 1000	Clay	N/A	0	10	Second round (lost to (United States) Sebastian Korda, 6–7^{(2–7)}, 7–6^{(7–5)}, 3–6)
18 April 2022– 24 April 2022	Barcelona Open	Barcelona (ESP)	500 Series	Clay	1R	0	500	Champion (defeated (Spain) Pablo Carreño Busta, 6–3, 6–2)
2 May 2022– 8 May 2022	Madrid Open	Madrid (ESP)	Masters 1000	Clay	2R	45	1000	Champion (defeated (Germany) Alexander Zverev, 6–3, 6–1)
22 May 2022– 5 June 2022	French Open	Paris (FRA)	Grand Slam	Clay	3R	90	360	Quarterfinals (lost to (Germany) Alexander Zverev, 4–6, 4–6, 6–4, 6–7^{(7–9)})
27 June 2022– 10 July 2022	Wimbledon	London (GBR)	Grand Slam	Grass	2R	45	0 (Note: Removal Of ATP Rankings Points From 2022 Wimbledon.)	Fourth round (lost to (Italy) Jannik Sinner, 1–6, 4–6, 7–6^{(10–8)}, 3–6)
17 July 2022– 24 July 2022	Hamburg European Open	Hamburg (GER)	500 Series	Grass	N/A	0	300	Final (lost to (Italy) Lorenzo Musetti, 4–6, 7–6^{(8–6)}, 4–6)
25 July 2022– 31 July 2022	Croatia Open	Umag (CRO)	250 series	Clay	W	250	150	Final (lost to (Italy) Jannik Sinner, 7–6^{(7–5)}, 1–6, 1–6)
8 August 2022– 14 August 2022	Canadian Open	Toronto (CAN)	Masters 1000	Hard	N/A	0	10	Second round (lost to (United States) Tommy Paul, 7–6^{(7–4)}, 6–7^{(7–9)}, 3–6)
14 August 2022– 21 August 2022	Cincinnati Masters	Cincinnati (USA)	Masters 1000	Hard	1R	10	180	Quarterfinals (lost to (United Kingdom) Cameron Norrie, 6–7^{(4–7)}, 7–6^{(7–4)}, 4–6)
29 August 2022– 11 September 2022	US Open	New York (USA)	Grand Slam	Hard	QF	360	2000	Champion (defeated (Norway) Casper Ruud, 6–4, 2–6, 7–6^{(7–1)}, 6–3)
3 October 2022– 9 October 2022	Astana Open	Astana (KAZ)	500 series	Hard (i)	N/A	0	0	First round (lost to (Belgium) David Goffin, 5–7, 3–6)
24 October 2022– 30 October 2022	Swiss Indoors	Basel (SUI)	500 Series	Hard (i)	N/A	0	180	Semifinals (lost to (Canada) Félix Auger-Aliassime, 3–6, 2–6)
31 October 2022– 6 November 2022	Paris Masters	Paris (FRA)	Masters 1000	Hard (i)	3R	90	180	Quarterfinals (lost to (Denmark) Holger Rune, 3–6, 6–6^{(1–3)} ret.)
13 November 2022– 20 November 2022	ATP Finals	Turin (ITA)	Tour Finals	Hard (i)	N/A	0	0	Withdrew
Total year-end points						1035	6820	▲5785 difference

- source：Rankings breakdown

== Yearly records ==
=== Head-to-head matchups ===
Carlos Alcaraz has a 57–13 ATP match win–loss record in the 2022 season. His record against players who were part of the ATP rankings Top Ten at the time of their meetings is 9–5. Bold indicates player was ranked top 10 at the time of at least one meeting. The following list is ordered by number of wins:

- (Croatia) Marin Čilić 3–0
- (Spain) Pablo Carreño Busta 2–0
- Karen Khachanov 2–0
- (United States) Mackenzie McDonald 2–0
- (Spain) Jaume Munar 2–0
- **(Norway) Casper Ruud** 2–0
- (South Korea) Kwon Soon-woo 2–0
- **(Greece) Stefanos Tsitsipas** 2–0
- (Argentina) Facundo Bagnis 1–0
- (Argentina) Sebastián Báez 1–0
- (Spain) Roberto Bautista Agut 1–0
- (Georgia (country)) Nikoloz Basilashvili 1–0
- (United States) Jenson Brooksby 1–0
- (Argentina) Federico Coria 1–0
- (Argentina) Federico Delbonis 1–0
- (Bulgaria) Grigor Dimitrov 1–0
- **(Serbia) Novak Djokovic** 1–0
- (United Kingdom) Jack Draper 1–0
- (Romania) Marius Copil 1–0
- (Slovakia) Norbert Gombos 1–0
- (Netherlands) Tallon Griekspoor 1–0
- (Italy) Fabio Fognini 1–0
- (Hungary) Márton Fucsovics 1–0
- **(Poland) Hubert Hurkacz** 1–0
- (Serbia) Miomir Kecmanović 1–0
- (Serbia) Filip Krajinović 1–0
- (Germany) Nicola Kuhn 1–0
- (Serbia) Dušan Lajović 1–0
- (Argentina) Juan Ignacio Londero 1–0
- (Australia) Alex de Minaur 1–0
- (France) Gaël Monfils 1–0
- (Slovakia) Alex Molčan 1–0
- (Japan) Yoshihito Nishioka 1–0
- (Germany) Oscar Otte 1–0
- (Argentina) Diego Schwartzman 1–0
- (Germany) Jan-Lennard Struff 1–0
- (Chile) Alejandro Tabilo 1–0
- (United States) Frances Tiafoe 1–0
- (Spain) Albert Ramos Viñolas 1–0
- (Netherlands) Botic van de Zandschulp 1–0
- (Italy) Giulio Zeppieri 1–0
- **(United Kingdom) Cameron Norrie** 2–1
- **(Italy) Matteo Berrettini** 1–1
- (United States) Sebastian Korda 1–1
- **(Spain) Rafael Nadal** 1–1
- **(Germany) Alexander Zverev** 1–1
- **(Italy) Jannik Sinner** 1–2
- (Belgium) David Goffin 0–1
- (Italy) Lorenzo Musetti 0–1
- (Denmark) Holger Rune 0–1
- (United States) Tommy Paul 0–1
- (Canada) **Félix Auger-Aliassime** 0–2

* Statistics correct as of 4 November 2022.

=== Top 10 record (9–5) ===
Category Grand Slam (1–2) ATP Finals (0–0) Masters 1000 (6–1) 500 Series (2–1) 250 Series (0–1)	Wins by surface Hard (4–3) Clay (5–2) Grass (0–0)	Wins by setting Outdoor (9–4) Indoor (0–1)

Result	W–L	Player	Rk	Event	Surface	Rd	Score	Rk	Ref
Loss	0–1	(Italy) Matteo Berrettini	7	Australian Open, Australia	Hard	3R	2–6, 6–7^{(3–7)}, 6–4, 6–2, 6–7^{(5–10)}	31	
Win	1–1	(Italy) Matteo Berrettini	6	Rio Open, Brazil	Clay	QF	6–2, 2–6, 6–2	29	
Loss	1–2	(Spain) Rafael Nadal	4	Indian Wells Open, United States	Hard	SF	4–6, 6–4, 3–6	19	
Win	2–2	(Greece) Stefanos Tsitsipas	5	Miami Open, United States	Hard	4R	7–5, 6–3	16	
Win	3–2	(Poland) Hubert Hurkacz	10	Miami Open, United States	Hard	SF	7–6^{(7–5)}, 7–6^{(7–2)}	16	
Win	4–2	(Norway) Casper Ruud	8	Miami Open, United States	Hard	F	7–5, 6–4	16	
Win	5–2	(Greece) Stefanos Tsitsipas	5	Barcelona Open, Spain	Clay	QF	6–4, 5–7, 6–2	11	
Win	6–2	(Spain) Rafael Nadal	4	Madrid Open, Spain	Clay	QF	6–2, 1–6, 6–3	9	
Win	7–2	(Serbia) Novak Djokovic	**1**	Madrid Open, Spain	Clay	SF	6–7^{(5–7)}, 7–5, 7–6^{(7–5)}	9	
Win	8–2	(Germany) Alexander Zverev	3	Madrid Open, Spain	Clay	F	6–3, 6–1	9	
Loss	8–3	(Germany) Alexander Zverev	3	French Open, France	Clay	QF	4–6, 4–6, 6–4, 6–7^{(7–9)}	6	
Loss	8–4	(Italy) Jannik Sinner	10	Croatia Open, Croatia	Clay	F	7–6^{(7–5)}, 1–6, 1–6	5	
Win	9–4	(Norway) Casper Ruud	7	US Open, United States	Hard	F	6–4, 2–6, 7–6^{(7–1)}, 6–3	4	
Loss	9–5	(Canada) Félix Auger-Aliassime	9	Swiss Indoors, Switzerland	Hard (i)	SF	3–6, 2–6	**1**	

- Key: (Rk) first use, opponent rank; (Rd) round; (Rk) 2nd use, player rank; (Ref) reference; (F) final; (SF) semifinal; (QF) quarterfinal; (#R) rounds 4, 3, 2, 1; (RR) round-robin stage; (Q#) qualifying rounds or stages (3), 2, 1.

=== Finals ===
==== Singles: 7 (5 titles, 2 runner-ups) ====
Category Grand Slam (1–0) ATP Finals (0–0) Masters 1000 (2–0) 500 Series (2–1) 250 Series (0–1)	Titles by surface Hard (2–0) Clay (3–2) Grass (0–0)	Titles by setting Outdoor (5–2) Indoor (0–0)

Result	W–L	Date	Tournament	Tier	Surface	Opponent	Score
Win	1–0	Feb 2022	Rio Open, Brazil	500 Series	Clay	(Argentina) Diego Schwartzman	6–4, 6–2
Win	2–0	Mar 2022	Miami Open, United States	Masters 1000	Hard	(Norway) Casper Ruud	7–5, 6–4
Win	3–0	Apr 2022	Barcelona Open, Spain	500 Series	Clay	(Spain) Pablo Carreño Busta	6–3, 6–2
Win	4–0	May 2022	Madrid Open, Spain	Masters 1000	Clay	(Germany) Alexander Zverev	6–3, 6–1
Loss	4–1	Jul 2022	Hamburg European Open, Germany	500 Series	Clay	(Italy) Lorenzo Musetti	4–6, 7–6^{(8–6)}, 4–6
Loss	4–2	Jul 2022	Croatia Open, Croatia	250 Series	Clay	(Italy) Jannik Sinner	7–6^{(7–5)}, 1–6, 1–6
Win	5–2	Sep 2022	US Open, United States	Grand Slam	Hard	(Norway) Casper Ruud	6–4, 2–6, 7–6^{(7–1)}, 6–3

=== Earnings ===
- **Bold** font denotes tournament win

**Singles**
Event	Prize money	Year-to-date
Australian Open	A$ 221,000	$159,208
**Rio Open**	**$317,400**	$476,608
Indian Wells Masters	$343,985	$820,593
**Miami Open**	**$1,231,245**	$2,051,838
Monte-Carlo Masters	€39,070	$2,094,334
**Barcelona Open**	**€467,150**	$2,599,323
**Madrid Open**	**€1,041,570**	$3,697,242
French Open	€380,000	$4,102,094
Wimbledon Championships	£190,000	$4,335,300
Hamburg European Open	€178,170	$4,515,020
Croatia Open Umag	€47,430	$4,563,460
Canadian Open	$42,760	$4,606,220
Cincinnati Masters	$157,995	$4,764,215
**US Open**	**$2,600,000**	$7,364,215
Astana Open	$14,820	$7,379,035
Swiss Indoors	€114,505	$7,491,891
Paris Masters	€136,225	$7,627,613
Bonus pool	$2,447,200	$10,074,813
		$10,074,813
**Doubles**
Event	Prize money	Year-to-date
Rio Open	$ 3,480	$3,480
Indian Wells Masters	$8,790	$12,270
Madrid Open	€14,465	$27,517
		$27,517
**Total**
		**$10,102,330**

Figures in United States dollars (USD) unless noted.

- source：2022 Singles Activity
- source：2022 Doubles Activity

== See also ==
- 2022 ATP Tour
- 2022 Rafael Nadal tennis season
- 2022 Novak Djokovic tennis season
- 2022 Daniil Medvedev tennis season
