= 2022 Monte-Carlo Masters – Doubles =

Doubles
- 2022 Monte-Carlo Masters

Final
- Champions: (United States) Rajeev Ram (United Kingdom) Joe Salisbury
- Runners-up: (Colombia) Juan Sebastián Cabal (Colombia) Robert Farah
- Score: 6–4, 3–6, [10–7]

Events
Singles	Doubles
- Monte-Carlo Masters

Rajeev Ram and Joe Salisbury defeated Juan Sebastián Cabal and Robert Farah in the final, 6–4, 3–6, [10–7]. Their victory earned them their first ATP Tour Masters 1000 on clay and their second Masters 1000 title overall.

Nikola Mektić and Mate Pavić were the defending champions, but lost in the quarterfinals to Cabal and Farah.

== Seeds ==
The top four seeds received a bye into the second round.

1. (United States) Rajeev Ram / (United Kingdom) Joe Salisbury (champions)
2. (Croatia) Nikola Mektić / (Croatia) Mate Pavić (quarterfinals)
3. (Spain) Marcel Granollers / (Argentina) Horacio Zeballos (quarterfinals)
4. (France) Pierre-Hugues Herbert / (France) Nicolas Mahut (second round)
5. (Germany) Tim Pütz / (New Zealand) Michael Venus (quarterfinals)
6. (Colombia) Juan Sebastián Cabal / (Colombia) Robert Farah (final)
7. (Netherlands) Wesley Koolhof / (United Kingdom) Neal Skupski (first round)
8. (El Salvador) Marcelo Arévalo / (Netherlands) Jean-Julien Rojer (semifinals)

== Draw ==
Key

- Q = Qualifier
- WC = Wild card
- LL = Lucky loser
- Alt = Alternate
- ITF = ITF entry
- PR = Protected ranking
- SR = Special ranking
- SE = Special exempt
- JE = Junior exempt
- JR = Junior Accelerator Programme entrant
- CO = College Accelerator Programme entrant
- NG = Next Gen Accelerator Program entrant
- w/o = Walkover
- r = Retired
- d = Defaulted

=== Finals ===
Semifinals
1	(United States) Rajeev Ram (United Kingdom) Joe Salisbury	3	7^{7}	[11]
(India) Rohan Bopanna (United Kingdom) Jamie Murray	6	6^{4}	[9]
8	(El Salvador) Marcelo Arévalo (Netherlands) Jean-Julien Rojer	5	3
6	(Colombia) Juan Sebastián Cabal (Colombia) Robert Farah	7	6

Final
1	(United States) Rajeev Ram (United Kingdom) Joe Salisbury	6	3	[10]
6	(Colombia) Juan Sebastián Cabal (Colombia) Robert Farah	4	6	[7]

=== Top half ===
First round
(Croatia) M Čilić (Croatia) I Dodig	6	4	[4]
(Uruguay) A Behar (Ecuador) G Escobar	2	6	[10]
PR	(United States) A Krajicek (France) É Roger-Vasselin	6	6^{9}	[8]
A Karatsev (Australia) J Peers	4	7^{11}	[10]
K Khachanov; A Rublev	6	5	[5]
5	(Germany) T Pütz (New Zealand) M Venus	4	7	[10]
WC	(Monaco) R Arneodo (Monaco) H Nys	6	5	[10]
(United Kingdom) D Evans (Argentina) D Schwartzman	4	7	[12]
(United States) T Fritz (United States) S Korda	6	7
(Germany) K Krawietz (Germany) A Mies	3	5
(India) R Bopanna (United Kingdom) J Murray	2	6	[12]
7	(Netherlands) W Koolhof (United Kingdom) N Skupski	6	3	[10]

Second round
1	(United States) R Ram (United Kingdom) J Salisbury	6	6
(Uruguay) A Behar (Ecuador) G Escobar	2	3
A Karatsev (Australia) J Peers	6	4	[4]
5	(Germany) T Pütz (New Zealand) M Venus	4	6	[10]
3	(Spain) M Granollers (Argentina) H Zeballos	w/o
(United Kingdom) D Evans (Argentina) D Schwartzman
(United States) T Fritz (United States) S Korda	4	7^{9}	[7]
(India) R Bopanna (United Kingdom) J Murray	6	6^{7}	[10]

Quarterfinals
1	(United States) R Ram (United Kingdom) J Salisbury	6	6
5	(Germany) T Pütz (New Zealand) M Venus	4	3
3	(Spain) M Granollers (Argentina) H Zeballos	6^{8}	6^{8}
(India) R Bopanna (United Kingdom) J Murray	7^{10}	7^{10}

Semifinals
1	(United States) R Ram (United Kingdom) J Salisbury	3	7^{7}	[11]
(India) R Bopanna (United Kingdom) J Murray	6	6^{4}	[9]

=== Bottom half ===
First round
8	(El Salvador) M Arévalo (Netherlands) J-J Rojer	6	6
(Australia) A de Minaur (United Kingdom) C Norrie	3	3
(Bosnia and Herzegovina) T Brkić (Serbia) N Ćaćić	6	6
PR	(Canada) F Auger-Aliassime (Switzerland) S Wawrinka	2	4
WC	(Brazil) M Melo (Germany) A Zverev	6	6
(Poland) H Hurkacz (Italy) J Sinner	4	3
6	(Colombia) JS Cabal (Colombia) R Farah	7^{8}	4	[10]
(Belgium) S Gillé (Belgium) J Vliegen	6^{6}	6	[7]
(Mexico) S González (Argentina) A Molteni	6	6
(Georgia (country)) N Basilashvili (Kazakhstan) A Bublik	3	4
WC	(Greece) Pe Tsitsipas (Greece) S Tsitsipas	6^{4}	6	[10]
(Kazakhstan) A Golubev (Italy) L Sonego	7^{7}	4	[2]

Second round
8	(El Salvador) M Arévalo (Netherlands) J-J Rojer	6	6
(Bosnia and Herzegovina) T Brkić (Serbia) N Ćaćić	3	3
WC	(Brazil) M Melo (Germany) A Zverev	7	6
4	(France) P-H Herbert (France) N Mahut	5	4
6	(Colombia) JS Cabal (Colombia) R Farah	6	6
(Mexico) S González (Argentina) A Molteni	2	4
WC	(Greece) Pe Tsitsipas (Greece) S Tsitsipas	3	3
2	(Croatia) N Mektić (Croatia) M Pavić	6	6

Quarterfinals
8	(El Salvador) M Arévalo (Netherlands) J-J Rojer	w/o
WC	(Brazil) M Melo (Germany) A Zverev
6	(Colombia) JS Cabal (Colombia) R Farah	6	6
2	(Croatia) N Mektić (Croatia) M Pavić	4	4

Semifinals
8	(El Salvador) M Arévalo (Netherlands) J-J Rojer	5	3
6	(Colombia) JS Cabal (Colombia) R Farah	7	6
