= 2022 Rio Open – Doubles =

Doubles
- 2022 Rio Open

Final
- Champions: (Italy) Simone Bolelli (Italy) Fabio Fognini
- Runners-up: (United Kingdom) Jamie Murray (Brazil) Bruno Soares
- Score: 7–5, 6–7^{(2–7)}, [10–6]

Details
- Draw: 16
- Seeds: 4

Events
Singles	Doubles
- Rio Open

Marcel Granollers and Horacio Zeballos were the defending champions, when the event was last held in 2020, but lost to Jamie Murray and Bruno Soares in the semifinals.

Simone Bolelli and Fabio Fognini won the title, defeating Murray and Soares in the final, 7–5, 6–7^{(2–7)}, [10–6].

== Seeds ==
1. (Spain) Marcel Granollers / (Argentina) Horacio Zeballos (semifinals)
2. (Colombia) Juan Sebastián Cabal / (Colombia) Robert Farah (first round)
3. (United Kingdom) Jamie Murray / (Brazil) Bruno Soares (final)
4. (Uruguay) Ariel Behar / (Ecuador) Gonzalo Escobar (first round)

== Draw ==
Key

- Q = Qualifier
- WC = Wild card
- LL = Lucky loser
- Alt = Alternate
- ITF = ITF entry
- PR = Protected ranking
- SR = Special ranking
- SE = Special exempt
- JE = Junior exempt
- JR = Junior Accelerator Programme entrant
- CO = College Accelerator Programme entrant
- NG = Next Gen Accelerator Program entrant
- w/o = Walkover
- r = Retired
- d = Defaulted

=== Draw ===
First round
1	(Spain) M Granollers (Argentina) H Zeballos	7	6
WC	(Brazil) R Matos (Brazil) F Meligeni Alves	5	2
(Argentina) M González (Argentina) D Schwartzman	6	3	[7]
(Spain) C Alcaraz (Spain) P Carreño Busta	1	6	[10]
3	(United Kingdom) J Murray (Brazil) B Soares	6	6
WC	(Brazil) R Dutra Silva (Brazil) O Luz	3	2
(Bosnia and Herzegovina) T Brkić (Serbia) N Ćaćić	6	3	[8]
(France) B Paire (Spain) A Ramos Viñolas	4	6	[10]
(Serbia) L Đere (Serbia) D Lajović	6^{3}	6^{5}
Q	(Spain) P Andújar (Spain) P Martínez	7^{7}	7^{7}
(Italy) S Bolelli (Italy) F Fognini	7^{8}	6
4	(Uruguay) A Behar (Ecuador) G Escobar	6^{6}	2
(Mexico) S González (Argentina) A Molteni	7^{7}	6
PR	(Uruguay) P Cuevas (Brazil) M Melo	6^{4}	3
(Italy) L Sonego (Italy) A Vavassori	7^{9}	5	[14]
2	(Colombia) JS Cabal (Colombia) R Farah	6^{7}	7	[12]

Quarterfinals
1	(Spain) M Granollers (Argentina) H Zeballos	w/o
(Spain) C Alcaraz (Spain) P Carreño Busta
3	(United Kingdom) J Murray (Brazil) B Soares	6	6
(France) B Paire (Spain) A Ramos Viñolas	3	4
Q	(Spain) P Andújar (Spain) P Martínez	3	1
(Italy) S Bolelli (Italy) F Fognini	6	6
(Mexico) S González (Argentina) A Molteni	7	6
(Italy) L Sonego (Italy) A Vavassori	5	4

Semifinals
1	(Spain) M Granollers (Argentina) H Zeballos	3	2
3	(United Kingdom) J Murray (Brazil) B Soares	6	6
(Italy) S Bolelli (Italy) F Fognini	7^{7}	6
(Mexico) S González (Argentina) A Molteni	6^{4}	2

Final
3	(United Kingdom) J Murray (Brazil) B Soares	5	7^{7}	[6]
(Italy) S Bolelli (Italy) F Fognini	7	6^{2}	[10]

== Qualifying ==
=== Seeds ===
1. (Spain) Pablo Andújar / (Spain) Pedro Martínez (qualified)
2. (Chile) Nicolás Jarry / (Venezuela) Luis David Martínez (qualifying competition)

=== Qualifiers ===
1. (Spain) Pablo Andújar / (Spain) Pedro Martínez

=== Qualifying draw ===
First round
1/PR	(Spain) Pablo Andújar (Spain) Pedro Martínez	7^{7}	6
Alt	(Czech Republic) Zdeněk Kolář (Serbia) Nikola Milojević	6^{3}	4
WC	(Brazil) Mateus Alves (Brazil) Gilbert Klier Júnior	1	3
2	(Chile) Nicolás Jarry (Venezuela) Luis David Martínez	6	6

Qualifying competition
1/PR	(Spain) Pablo Andújar (Spain) Pedro Martínez	7	6
2	(Chile) Nicolás Jarry (Venezuela) Luis David Martínez	5	4
