= 2022 Croatia Open Umag – Doubles =

Doubles
- 2022 Croatia Open Umag
- 2021 Champions: (Brazil) Fernando Romboli (Spain) David Vega Hernández

Final
- Champions: (Italy) Simone Bolelli (Italy) Fabio Fognini
- Runners-up: (United Kingdom) Lloyd Glasspool (Finland) Harri Heliövaara
- Score: 5–7, 7–6^{(8–6)}, [10–7]

Details
- Draw: 16
- Seeds: 4

Events
Singles	Doubles
← 2021 ·	Croatia Open	· 2023 →

Simone Bolelli and Fabio Fognini defeated Lloyd Glasspool and Harri Heliövaara in the final, 5–7, 7–6^{(8–6)}, [10–7] to win the doubles tennis title at the 2022 Croatia Open Umag. The Italians saved six match points in the second-set tie-break from 0–6 down.

Fernando Romboli and David Vega Hernández were the defending champions, but did not compete together. Romboli partnered Albano Olivetti, but lost in the first round to Rafael Matos and Vega Hernández. Matos and Vega Hernández lost in the semifinals to Glasspool and Heliövaara.

== Seeds ==
1. (Italy) Simone Bolelli / (Italy) Fabio Fognini (champions)
2. (Brazil) Rafael Matos / (Spain) David Vega Hernández (semifinals)
3. (United Kingdom) Lloyd Glasspool / (Finland) Harri Heliövaara (final)
4. (Kazakhstan) Andrey Golubev / (Argentina) Máximo González (first round)

== Draw ==
=== Key ===
- Q = Qualifier
- WC = Wild card
- LL = Lucky loser
- Alt = Alternate
- ITF = ITF entry
- PR = Protected ranking
- SR = Special ranking
- SE = Special exempt
- JE = Junior exempt
- JR = Junior Accelerator Programme entrant
- CO = College Accelerator Programme entrant
- NG = Next Gen Accelerator Program entrant
- w/o = Walkover
- r = Retired
- d = Defaulted

=== Draw ===
First round
1	(Italy) S Bolelli (Italy) F Fognini	6	6
(Spain) R Carballés Baena (Argentina) TM Etcheverry	2	2
(Slovakia) A Molčan (Slovakia) I Zelenay	6	6^{4}	[3]
WC	(Croatia) A Šančić (Croatia) F Škugor	4	7^{7}	[10]
4	(Kazakhstan) A Golubev (Argentina) M González	4	6^{3}
(Bosnia and Herzegovina) T Brkić (Portugal) F Cabral	6	7^{7}
(Czech Republic) R Jebavý (Ukraine) D Molchanov	6	4	[6]
(United States) N Lammons (United States) J Withrow	2	6	[10]
WC	(Croatia) M Poljičak (Croatia) N Serdarušić	w/o
(Italy) L Musetti (Spain) B Zapata Miralles
PR	(Netherlands) S Arends (Netherlands) D Pel	3	6^{2}
3	(United Kingdom) L Glasspool (Finland) H Heliövaara	6	7^{7}
(Sweden) A Göransson (Japan) B McLachlan	6	2	[4]
(Colombia) N Barrientos (Mexico) MÁ Reyes-Varela	3	6	[10]
(France) A Olivetti (Brazil) F Romboli	6	3	[9]
2	(Brazil) R Matos (Spain) D Vega Hernández	3	6	[11]

Quarterfinals
1	(Italy) S Bolelli (Italy) F Fognini	7^{7}	6^{6}	[10]
WC	(Croatia) A Šančić (Croatia) F Škugor	6^{1}	7^{8}	[7]
(Bosnia and Herzegovina) T Brkić (Portugal) F Cabral	6	7
(United States) N Lammons (United States) J Withrow	4	5
WC	(Croatia) M Poljičak (Croatia) N Serdarušić	3	3
3	(United Kingdom) L Glasspool (Finland) H Heliövaara	6	6
(Colombia) N Barrientos (Mexico) MÁ Reyes-Varela	4	5
2	(Brazil) R Matos (Spain) D Vega Hernández	6	7

Semifinals
1	(Italy) S Bolelli (Italy) F Fognini	6	7^{7}
(Bosnia and Herzegovina) T Brkić (Portugal) F Cabral	0	6^{5}
3	(United Kingdom) L Glasspool (Finland) H Heliövaara	6	5	[10]
2	(Brazil) R Matos (Spain) D Vega Hernández	1	7	[8]

Final
1	(Italy) S Bolelli (Italy) F Fognini	5	7^{8}	[10]
3	(United Kingdom) L Glasspool (Finland) H Heliövaara	7	6^{6}	[7]
