= 2022 Barcelona Open Banc Sabadell – Doubles =

Doubles
- 2022 Barcelona Open Banc Sabadell

Final
- Champions: (Germany) Kevin Krawietz (Germany) Andreas Mies
- Runners-up: (Netherlands) Wesley Koolhof (United Kingdom) Neal Skupski
- Score: 6–7^{(3–7)}, 7–6^{(7–5)}, [10–6]

Events
Singles	Doubles
← 2021 ·	Barcelona Open Banc Sabadell	· 2023 →

Kevin Krawietz and Andreas Mies defeated Wesley Koolhof and Neal Skupski in the final, 6–7^{(3–7)}, 7–6^{(7–5)}, [10–6] to win the doubles tennis title at the 2022 Barcelona Open.

Juan Sebastián Cabal and Robert Farah were the two-time defending champions, but they lost in the quarterfinals to Krawietz and Mies.

The tournament marked the final professional appearance of former doubles world No. 5 and ATP Finals champion David Marrero.

== Seeds ==
1. (United States) Rajeev Ram / (United Kingdom) Joe Salisbury (first round)
2. (Spain) Marcel Granollers / (Argentina) Horacio Zeballos (first round)
3. (Germany) Tim Pütz / (New Zealand) Michael Venus (withdrew)
4. (Colombia) Juan Sebastián Cabal / (Colombia) Robert Farah (quarterfinals)

== Draw ==
=== Key ===
- Q = Qualifier
- WC = Wild card
- LL = Lucky loser
- Alt = Alternate
- SE = Special exempt
- PR = Protected ranking
- ITF = ITF entry
- JE = Junior exempt
- w/o = Walkover
- r = Retired
- d = Defaulted
- SR = Special ranking

=== Draw ===
First Round
1	(United States) R Ram (United Kingdom) J Salisbury	3	6	[11]
WC	(Spain) F López (Spain) M López	6	3	[13]
LL	(Belgium) S Gillé (Belgium) J Vliegen	3	6^{9}
(Netherlands) W Koolhof (United Kingdom) N Skupski	6	7^{11}
LL	(Spain) P Martínez (Italy) L Sonego	6	6
WC	(Spain) D Marrero (Spain) J Munar	3	2
(Georgia (country)) N Basilashvili (Kazakhstan) A Bublik	3	6^{5}
(El Salvador) M Arévalo (Netherlands) J-J Rojer	6	7^{7}
(France) N Mahut (France) É Roger-Vasselin	3	6	[8]
(Germany) K Krawietz (Germany) A Mies	6	3	[10]
(United Kingdom) D Evans (United Kingdom) J Murray	3	2
4	(Colombia) JS Cabal (Colombia) R Farah	6	6
Q	(France) U Humbert (United States) S Korda	4	6^{8}
(Argentina) M González (South Africa) L Harris	6	7^{10}
(Mexico) S González (Argentina) A Molteni	4	7^{7}	[10]
2	(Spain) M Granollers (Argentina) H Zeballos	6	6^{1}	[5]

Quarterfinals
WC	(Spain) F López (Spain) M López
(Netherlands) W Koolhof (United Kingdom) N Skupski	w/o
LL	(Spain) P Martínez (Italy) L Sonego	3	6^{4}
(El Salvador) M Arévalo (Netherlands) J-J Rojer	6	7^{7}
(Germany) K Krawietz (Germany) A Mies	6	7
4	(Colombia) JS Cabal (Colombia) R Farah	4	5
(Argentina) M González (South Africa) L Harris
(Mexico) S González (Argentina) A Molteni	w/o

Semifinals
(Netherlands) W Koolhof (United Kingdom) N Skupski	6	2	[10]
(El Salvador) M Arévalo (Netherlands) J-J Rojer	4	6	[8]
(Germany) K Krawietz (Germany) A Mies	6^{6}	6	[10]
(Mexico) S González (Argentina) A Molteni	7^{8}	4	[7]

Final
(Netherlands) W Koolhof (United Kingdom) N Skupski	7^{7}	6^{5}	[6]
(Germany) K Krawietz (Germany) A Mies	6^{3}	7^{7}	[10]

== Qualifying ==
=== Seeds ===
1. (Belgium) Sander Gillé / (Belgium) Joran Vliegen (qualifying competition, lucky losers)
2. (Spain) Pedro Martínez / (Italy) Lorenzo Sonego (first round, lucky losers)

=== Qualifiers ===
1. (France) Ugo Humbert / (United States) Sebastian Korda

=== Lucky losers ===
1. (Belgium) Sander Gillé / (Belgium) Joran Vliegen
2. (Spain) Pedro Martínez / (Italy) Lorenzo Sonego

=== Qualifying draw ===
First round
1	(Belgium) Sander Gillé (Belgium) Joran Vliegen	6	6
(France) Adrian Mannarino (France) Benoît Paire	3	4
(France) Ugo Humbert (United States) Sebastian Korda	7	4	[10]
2	(Spain) Pedro Martínez (Italy) Lorenzo Sonego	5	6	[6]

Qualifying competition
1	(Belgium) Sander Gillé (Belgium) Joran Vliegen	3	6	[8]
(France) Ugo Humbert (United States) Sebastian Korda	6	1	[10]
