= 2022 Croatia Open Umag =

- Date: 25–31 July
- Edition: 32nd
- Category: ATP Tour 250
- Draw: 28S / 16D
- Prize money: €534,555
- Surface: Clay
- Location: Umag, Croatia

Champions

Singles
- (Italy) Jannik Sinner

Doubles
- (Italy) Simone Bolelli / (Italy) Fabio Fognini
- Croatia Open

The 2022 Croatia Open Umag, also known as the Plava Laguna Croatia Open Umag (for sponsorship reasons), was a men's tennis tournament played on outdoor clay courts. It was the 32nd edition of the Croatia Open, and part of the 250 Series tier of the 2022 ATP Tour. It took place at the International Tennis Center in Umag, Croatia, from 25 July until 31 July 2022. Second-seeded Jannik Sinner won the singles title.

== Finals ==
=== Singles ===
(Italy) Jannik Sinner defeated (Spain) Carlos Alcaraz, 6–7^{(5–7)}, 6–1, 6–1

- It was Sinner's only singles title of the year and the 6th of his career.

=== Doubles ===
(Italy) Simone Bolelli / (Italy) Fabio Fognini defeated (United Kingdom) Lloyd Glasspool / (Finland) Harri Heliövaara, 5–7, 7–6^{(8–6)}, [10–7]

== Points and prize money ==
=== Point distribution ===
Event	W	F	SF	QF	Round of 16	Round of 32	Q	Q2	Q1
Singles	250	150	90	45	20	0	12	6	0
Doubles	250	150	90	45	0	—N/a	—N/a	—N/a	—N/a

=== Prize money ===
Event	W	F	SF	QF	Round of 16	Round of 32	Q2	Q1
Singles	€41,145	€29,500	€21,000	€14,000	€9,000	€5,415	€2,645	€1,375
Doubles*	€15,360	€11,000	€7,250	€4,710	€2,760	—N/a	—N/a	—N/a

_{*per team}

== Singles main draw entrants ==
=== Seeds ===
Country	Player	Rank^{1}	Seed
ESP	Carlos Alcaraz	6	1
ITA	Jannik Sinner	10	2
DNK	Holger Rune	27	3
ARG	Sebastián Báez	32	4
SVK	Alex Molčan	48	5
GER	Daniel Altmaier	56	6
ITA	Fabio Fognini	61	7
ITA	Lorenzo Musetti	62	8

- ^{1} Rankings are as of 18 July 2022.

=== Other entrants ===
The following players received wildcards into the main draw:

- (Croatia) Duje Ajduković
- (Croatia) Mili Poljičak
- (Croatia) Dino Prižmić

The following player received entry with a protected ranking:

- (Slovenia) Aljaž Bedene

The following players received entry from the qualifying draw:

- (Italy) Franco Agamenone
- (Italy) Marco Cecchinato
- (France) Corentin Moutet
- (Italy) Giulio Zeppieri

The following player received entry as a lucky loser:

- (Slovakia) Norbert Gombos

=== Withdrawals ===
Before the tournament

- (Georgia (country)) Nikoloz Basilashvili → replaced by (Spain) Bernabé Zapata Miralles
- (Argentina) Francisco Cerúndolo → replaced by (Colombia) Daniel Elahi Galán
- (Serbia) Filip Krajinović → replaced by (Argentina) Facundo Bagnis
- (Czech Republic) Jiří Veselý → replaced by (Slovakia) Norbert Gombos

== Doubles main draw entrants ==
=== Seeds ===
Country	Player	Country	Player	Rank^{1}	Seed
ITA	Simone Bolelli	ITA	Fabio Fognini	60	1
BRA	Rafael Matos	ESP	David Vega Hernández	71	2
GBR	Lloyd Glasspool	FIN	Harri Heliövaara	78	3
KAZ	Andrey Golubev	ARG	Máximo González	89	4

- ^{1} Rankings as of 18 July 2022.

=== Other entrants ===
The following pairs received wildcards into the doubles main draw:

- (Croatia) Mili Poljičak / (Croatia) Nino Serdarušić
- (Croatia) Antonio Šančić / (Croatia) Franko Škugor

=== Withdrawals ===
Before the tournament

- (Slovenia) Aljaž Bedene / (Czech Republic) Jiří Veselý → replaced by (Netherlands) Sander Arends / (Netherlands) David Pel
