= 2022 Croatia Open Umag – Singles =

Singles
- 2022 Croatia Open Umag

Final
- Champion: (Italy) Jannik Sinner
- Runner-up: (Spain) Carlos Alcaraz
- Score: 6–7^{(5–7)}, 6–1, 6–1

Details
- Draw: 28 (4 Q / 3 WC )
- Seeds: 8

Events
Singles	Doubles
- Croatia Open

Jannik Sinner defeated defending champion Carlos Alcaraz in the final, 6–7^{(5–7)}, 6–1, 6–1 to win the singles tennis title at the 2022 Croatia Open Umag. It was the pair's first meeting in a final.

== Seeds ==
The top four seeds receive a bye into the second round.

1. (Spain) Carlos Alcaraz (final)
2. (Italy) Jannik Sinner (champion)
3. (Denmark) Holger Rune (second round)
4. (Argentina) Sebastián Báez (second round)
5. (Slovakia) Alex Molčan (second round)
6. (Germany) Daniel Altmaier (first round)
7. (Italy) Fabio Fognini (first round)
8. (Italy) Lorenzo Musetti (second round)

== Draw ==
Key

- Q = Qualifier
- WC = Wild card
- LL = Lucky loser
- Alt = Alternate
- ITF = ITF entry
- PR = Protected ranking
- SR = Special ranking
- SE = Special exempt
- JE = Junior exempt
- JR = Junior Accelerator Programme entrant
- CO = College Accelerator Programme entrant
- NG = Next Gen Accelerator Program entrant
- w/o = Walkover
- r = Retired
- d = Defaulted

=== Finals ===
Semifinals
1	(Spain) Carlos Alcaraz	7	4	6
Q	(Italy) Giulio Zeppieri	5	6	3
Q	(Italy) Franco Agamenone	1	3
2	(Italy) Jannik Sinner	6	6

Final
1	(Spain) Carlos Alcaraz	7^{7}	1	1
2	(Italy) Jannik Sinner	6^{5}	6	6

=== Top half ===
First round
LL	(Slovakia) N Gombos	6	5	6
(Argentina) F Delbonis	4	7	4
(Argentina) TM Etcheverry	5	3
(Argentina) F Bagnis	7	6
Q	(France) C Moutet	6	6
6	(Germany) D Altmaier	4	2
WC	(Croatia) D Prižmić	4	0^{r}
(Spain) B Zapata Miralles	6	3
Q	(Italy) G Zeppieri	3	6	6
(Argentina) P Cachin	6	1	4
(Colombia) DE Galán	6	5	6
7	(Italy) F Fognini	3	7	3

Second round
1	(Spain) C Alcaraz	6	6
LL	(Slovakia) N Gombos	2	3
(Argentina) F Bagnis	6	6
Q	(France) C Moutet	3	1
3	(Denmark) H Rune	6	3	2
(Spain) B Zapata Miralles	3	6	6
Q	(Italy) G Zeppieri	6	3	6
(Colombia) DE Galán	4	6	1

Quarterfinals
1	(Spain) C Alcaraz	6	6
(Argentina) F Bagnis	0	4
(Spain) B Zapata Miralles	5	4
Q	(Italy) G Zeppieri	7	6

Semifinals
1	(Spain) C Alcaraz	7	4	6
Q	(Italy) G Zeppieri	5	6	3

=== Bottom half ===
First round
8	(Italy) L Musetti	6	3	6
PR	(Slovenia) A Bedene	2	6	1
Q	(Italy) M Cecchinato	6	5	6
WC	(Croatia) M Poljičak	1	7	2
Q	(Italy) F Agamenone	7^{10}	2	7
(Serbia) L Đere	6^{8}	6	5
5	(Slovakia) A Molčan	6	7^{7}
WC	(Croatia) D Ajduković	2	6^{2}
(Spain) R Carballés Baena	6	7
(Switzerland) H Laaksonen	4	5
(Spain) J Munar	4	6	6
(Sweden) M Ymer	6	1	4

Second round
8	(Italy) L Musetti	4	3
Q	(Italy) M Cecchinato	6	6
Q	(Italy) F Agamenone	3	6	7
4	(Argentina) S Báez	6	1	5
5	(Slovakia) A Molčan	6	2	3
(Spain) R Carballés Baena	3	6	6
(Spain) J Munar	4	4
2	(Italy) J Sinner	6	6

Quarterfinals
Q	(Italy) M Cecchinato	2	1
Q	(Italy) F Agamenone	6	6
(Spain) R Carballés Baena	4	6^{5}
2	(Italy) J Sinner	6	7^{7}

Semifinals
Q	(Italy) F Agamenone	1	3
2	(Italy) J Sinner	6	6

== Qualifying ==
=== Seeds ===
1. (France) Corentin Moutet (qualified)
2. (Slovakia) Norbert Gombos (qualifying competition, lucky loser)
3. (Sweden) Elias Ymer (qualifying competition)
4. (Italy) Flavio Cobolli (first round)
5. (Italy) Stefano Travaglia (first round)
6. (Italy) Franco Agamenone (qualified)
7. (Italy) Marco Cecchinato (qualified)
8. (Italy) Giulio Zeppieri (qualified)

=== Qualifiers ===
1. (France) Corentin Moutet
2. (Italy) Franco Agamenone
3. (Italy) Giulio Zeppieri
4. (Italy) Marco Cecchinato

=== Lucky loser ===
1. (Slovakia) Norbert Gombos

=== Qualifying draw ===
==== First qualifier ====
First round
1	(France) Corentin Moutet	6	6
(Croatia) Nino Serdarušić	3	3
WC	(Croatia) Matija Pecotić	6	6
5	(Italy) Stefano Travaglia	0	1

Qualifying competition
1	(France) Corentin Moutet	7	6
WC	(Croatia) Matija Pecotić	5	4

==== Second qualifier ====
First round
2	(Slovakia) Norbert Gombos	6	6
Alt	(Brazil) Fernando Romboli	1	2
(Slovakia) Filip Horanský	5	4
6	(Italy) Franco Agamenone	7	6

Qualifying competition
2	(Slovakia) Norbert Gombos	4	6	5
6	(Italy) Franco Agamenone	6	1	7

==== Third qualifier ====
First round
3	(Sweden) Elias Ymer	6	6^{4}	7
Alt	(Colombia) Nicolás Barrientos	4	7^{7}	5
(France) Gilles Simon	6	3	5
8	(Italy) Giulio Zeppieri	4	6	7

Qualifying competition
3	(Sweden) Elias Ymer	6	1	4
8	(Italy) Giulio Zeppieri	4	6	6

==== Fourth qualifier ====
First round
4	(Italy) Flavio Cobolli	1	7^{7}	4
(Italy) Andreas Seppi	6	6^{3}	6
WC	(Croatia) Domagoj Bilješko	3	1
7	(Italy) Marco Cecchinato	6	6

Qualifying competition
(Italy) Andreas Seppi
7	(Italy) Marco Cecchinato	w/o
