= 2022 Barcelona Open Banc Sabadell =

- Date: 18–24 April
- Edition: 69th
- Category: ATP Tour 500
- Draw: 48S / 16D
- Prize money: €2,661,825
- Surface: Clay
- Location: Barcelona, Spain
- Venue: Real Club de Tenis Barcelona

Champions

Singles
- (Spain) Carlos Alcaraz

Doubles
- (Germany) Kevin Krawietz / (Germany) Andreas Mies
- Barcelona Open

The 2022 Barcelona Open Banc Sabadell (also known as the Torneo Godó) was a men's tennis tournament played on outdoor clay courts at the Real Club de Tenis Barcelona in Barcelona, Spain, from 18 to 24 April 2022. It was the 69th edition of the event and part of the ATP Tour 500 series of the 2022 ATP Tour.

== Champions ==
=== Singles ===
- (Spain) Carlos Alcaraz def. (Spain) Pablo Carreño Busta, 6–3, 6–2

=== Doubles ===
- (Germany) Kevin Krawietz / (Germany) Andreas Mies def. (Netherlands) Wesley Koolhof / (United Kingdom) Neal Skupski, 6–7^{(3–7)}, 7–6^{(7–5)}, [10–6]

== Points and prize money ==
=== Points distribution ===
Event	W	F	SF	QF	Round of 16	Round of 32	Round of 64	Q	Q2	Q1
Singles	500	300	180	90	45	20	0	10	4	0
Doubles	500	300	180	90	0	—N/a	—N/a	45	25	0

=== Prize money ===
Event	W	F	SF	QF	Round of 16	Round of 32	Round of 64	Q2	Q1
Singles	€467,150	€249,140	€129,245	€67,480	€35,555	€19,465	€10,380	€5,450	€3,115
Doubles*	€163,500	€87,200	€44,120	€22,060	€11,420	—N/a	—N/a	—N/a	—N/a

_{*per team}

== Singles main-draw entrants ==
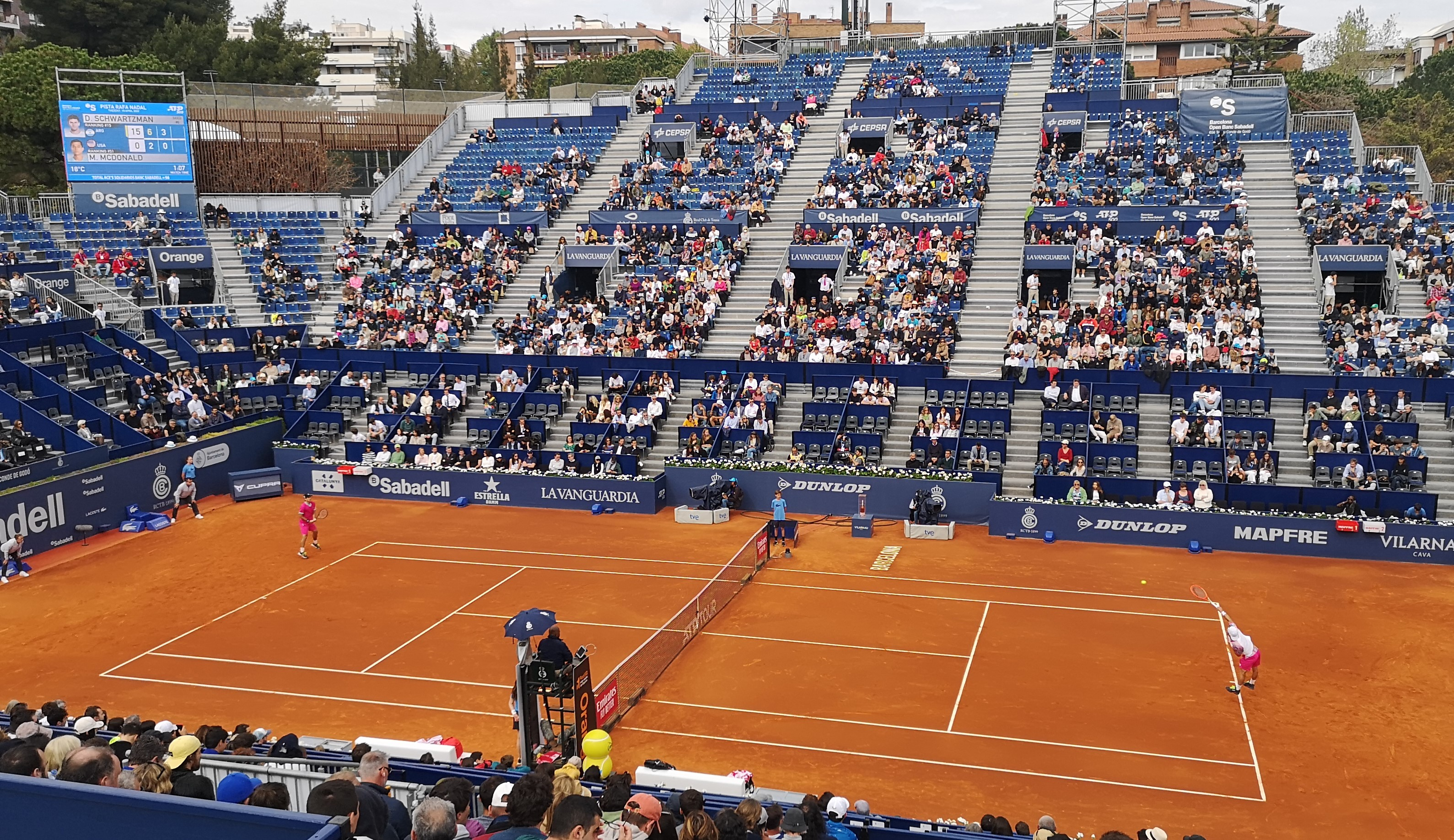
Diego Schwartzman vs Mackenzie McDonald in the round of 32, 2022 edition

=== Seeds ===
Country	Player	Rank^{1}	Seed
GRE	Stefanos Tsitsipas	5	1
NOR	Casper Ruud	7	2
CAN	Félix Auger-Aliassime	9	3
GBR	Cameron Norrie	10	4
ESP	Carlos Alcaraz	11	5
ARG	Diego Schwartzman	16	6
~~ESP~~	~~Roberto Bautista Agut~~	~~18~~	~~7~~
ESP	Pablo Carreño Busta	19	8
GEO	Nikoloz Basilashvili	20	9
AUS	Alex de Minaur	25	10
ITA	Lorenzo Sonego	26	11
GBR	Dan Evans	27	12
USA	Frances Tiafoe	28	13
BUL	Grigor Dimitrov	29	14
ARG	Federico Delbonis	34	15
KAZ	Alexander Bublik	36	16
ESP	Albert Ramos Viñolas	37	17

- ^{1} Rankings as of April 11, 2022.

=== Other entrants ===
The following players received wildcards into the main draw:

- (Canada) Félix Auger-Aliassime
- (Spain) Feliciano López
- (Spain) Jaume Munar
- (Spain) Tommy Robredo

The following players received entry from the qualifying draw:

- (Spain) Nicolás Álvarez Varona
- (Bolivia) Hugo Dellien
- Egor Gerasimov
- (Spain) Carlos Taberner
- (Sweden) Elias Ymer
- (Spain) Bernabé Zapata Miralles

The following players received entry as lucky losers:

- (France) Hugo Grenier
- (France) Manuel Guinard
- (Italy) Gian Marco Moroni

=== Withdrawals ===
Before the tournament

- (Spain) Roberto Bautista Agut → replaced by (France) Hugo Grenier
- (Spain) Alejandro Davidovich Fokina → replaced by (France) Manuel Guinard
- (Netherlands) Tallon Griekspoor → replaced by (United States) Maxime Cressy
- (Poland) Hubert Hurkacz → replaced by (Italy) Lorenzo Musetti
- (Spain) Rafael Nadal → replaced by (South Korea) Kwon Soon-woo
- (France) Arthur Rinderknech → replaced by (Italy) Gian Marco Moroni
- (Canada) Denis Shapovalov → replaced by (Spain) Pablo Andújar
- (Italy) Jannik Sinner → replaced by (Australia) Jordan Thompson
- (Germany) Jan-Lennard Struff → replaced by (Argentina) Sebastián Báez
- (Netherlands) Botic van de Zandschulp → replaced by (Spain) Roberto Carballés Baena

== Doubles main-draw entrants ==
=== Seeds ===
Country	Player	Country	Player	Rank^{1}	Seed
USA	Rajeev Ram	GBR	Joe Salisbury	3	1
ESP	Marcel Granollers	ARG	Horacio Zeballos	11	2
~~GER~~	~~Tim Pütz~~	~~NZL~~	~~Michael Venus~~	~~20~~	~~3~~
COL	Juan Sebastián Cabal	COL	Robert Farah	24	4

- Rankings are as of April 11, 2022.

=== Other entrants ===
The following pairs received wildcards into the doubles main draw:

- (Spain) David Marrero / (Spain) Jaume Munar
- (Spain) Feliciano López / (Spain) Marc López

The following pair received entry from the qualifying draw:

- (France) Ugo Humbert / (United States) Sebastian Korda

The following pairs received entry as lucky losers:

- (Belgium) Sander Gillé / (Belgium) Joran Vliegen
- (Spain) Pedro Martínez / (Italy) Lorenzo Sonego

=== Withdrawals ===
Before the tournament

- (Spain) Carlos Alcaraz / (Spain) Pablo Carreño Busta → replaced by (Belgium) Sander Gillé / (Belgium) Joran Vliegen
- (South Africa) Lloyd Harris / (Canada) Denis Shapovalov → replaced by (Argentina) Máximo González / (South Africa) Lloyd Harris
- (Australia) John Peers / (Slovakia) Filip Polášek → replaced by (Georgia (country)) Nikoloz Basilashvili / (Kazakhstan) Alexander Bublik
- (Germany) Tim Pütz / (New Zealand) Michael Venus → replaced by (Spain) Pedro Martínez / (Italy) Lorenzo Sonego
