= 2022 Monte-Carlo Masters =

- Date: 10–17 April
- Edition: 115th
- Category: Masters 1000
- Draw: 56S / 28D
- Prize money: €5,802,475
- Surface: Clay
- Location: Roquebrune-Cap-Martin, France (billed as Monte Carlo, Monaco)
- Venue: Monte Carlo Country Club

Champions

Singles
- (Greece) Stefanos Tsitsipas

Doubles
- (United States) Rajeev Ram / (United Kingdom) Joe Salisbury
← 2021 ·	Monte-Carlo Masters	· 2023 →

The 2022 Monte-Carlo Masters (also known as the Rolex Monte-Carlo Masters for sponsorship reasons) was a tennis tournament for male professionals, played on outdoor clay courts. It was the 115th edition of the annual Monte Carlo Masters tournament, sponsored by Rolex for the 13th time. It was held at the Monte Carlo Country Club in Roquebrune-Cap-Martin, France (though billed as Monte Carlo, Monaco). The event was part of the ATP Masters 1000 on the 2022 ATP Tour.

== Champions ==
=== Singles ===
- (Greece) Stefanos Tsitsipas def. (Spain) Alejandro Davidovich Fokina, 6–3, 7–6^{(7–3)}

=== Doubles ===
- (United States) Rajeev Ram / (United Kingdom) Joe Salisbury def. (Colombia) Juan Sebastián Cabal / (Colombia) Robert Farah, 6–4, 3–6, [10–7]

== Points ==
Because the Monte Carlo Masters is the non-mandatory Masters 1000 event, special rules regarding points distribution are in place. The Monte Carlo Masters counts as one of a player's 500 level tournaments, while distributing Masters 1000 points.

Event	W	F	SF	QF	Round of 16	Round of 32	Round of 64	Q	Q2	Q1
Men's Singles	1,000	600	360	180	90	45	10	25	16	0
Men's Doubles	1,000	600	360	180	90	0	—	—	—	—

=== Prize money ===
Event	W	F	SF	QF	Round of 16	Round of 32	Round of 64	Q2	Q1
Singles	€836,355	€456,720	€249,640	€136,225	€72,865	€39,070	€21,650	€9,205	€5,025
Doubles*	€256,610	€139,390	€76,560	€42,240	€23,230	€17,580	—	—	—

_{*per team}

== Singles main draw entrants ==
=== Seeds ===
Country	Player	Rank^{1}	Seed
SRB	Novak Djokovic	1	1
GER	Alexander Zverev	3	2
GRE	Stefanos Tsitsipas	5	3
NOR	Casper Ruud	7	4
	Andrey Rublev	8	5
CAN	Félix Auger-Aliassime	9	6
GBR	Cameron Norrie	10	7
ESP	Carlos Alcaraz	11	8
ITA	Jannik Sinner	12	9
USA	Taylor Fritz	13	10
POL	Hubert Hurkacz	14	11
ARG	Diego Schwartzman	16	12
ESP	Pablo Carreño Busta	17	13
~~ESP~~	~~Roberto Bautista Agut~~	~~19~~	~~14~~
GEO	Nikoloz Basilashvili	20	15
ITA	Lorenzo Sonego	21	16

^{1} Rankings are as of 4 April 2022

=== Other entrants ===
The following players received wildcards into the main draw:

- (Monaco) Lucas Catarina
- (Belgium) David Goffin
- (France) Jo-Wilfried Tsonga
- (Switzerland) Stan Wawrinka

The following player received entry using a protected ranking into the singles main draw:

- (Croatia) Borna Ćorić

The following players received entry via the qualifying draw:

- (Argentina) Sebastián Báez
- (Bolivia) Hugo Dellien
- (Czech Republic) Jiří Lehečka
- (Spain) Jaume Munar
- (Denmark) Holger Rune
- (Finland) Emil Ruusuvuori
- (Spain) Bernabé Zapata Miralles

The following players received entry as lucky losers:

- (France) Benjamin Bonzi
- (United States) Maxime Cressy
- (Germany) Oscar Otte

=== Withdrawals ===
- (Spain) Roberto Bautista Agut → replaced by (France) Benjamin Bonzi
- (Italy) Matteo Berrettini → replaced by (France) Arthur Rinderknech
- (Chile) Cristian Garín → replaced by (Germany) Oscar Otte
- (Germany) Dominik Koepfer → replaced by (United States) Marcos Giron
- Daniil Medvedev → replaced by (Netherlands) Tallon Griekspoor
- (France) Gaël Monfils → replaced by (United States) Maxime Cressy
- (Spain) Rafael Nadal → replaced by (France) Benoît Paire
- (Austria) Dominic Thiem → replaced by (Italy) Lorenzo Musetti

== Doubles main draw entrants ==
=== Seeds ===
Country	Player	Country	Player	Rank^{1}	Seed
USA	Rajeev Ram	GBR	Joe Salisbury	3	1
CRO	Nikola Mektić	CRO	Mate Pavić	7	2
ESP	Marcel Granollers	ARG	Horacio Zeballos	11	3
FRA	Pierre-Hugues Herbert	FRA	Nicolas Mahut	15	4
GER	Tim Pütz	NZL	Michael Venus	20	5
COL	Juan Sebastián Cabal	COL	Robert Farah	24	6
NED	Wesley Koolhof	GBR	Neal Skupski	31	7
ESA	Marcelo Arévalo	NED	Jean-Julien Rojer	51	8

^{1} Rankings are as of 4 April 2022.

=== Other entrants ===
The following pairs received wildcards into the doubles main draw:

- (Monaco) Romain Arneodo / (Monaco) Hugo Nys
- (Brazil) Marcelo Melo / (Germany) Alexander Zverev
- (Greece) Petros Tsitsipas / (Greece) Stefanos Tsitsipas

=== Withdrawals ===
Before the tournament

- (United Kingdom) Jamie Murray / (Brazil) Bruno Soares → replaced by (India) Rohan Bopanna / (United Kingdom) Jamie Murray
- (Australia) John Peers / (Slovakia) Filip Polášek → replaced by Aslan Karatsev / (Australia) John Peers
- (South Africa) Raven Klaasen / (Japan) Ben McLachlan → replaced by (Georgia (country)) Nikoloz Basilashvili / (Kazakhstan) Alexander Bublik
