= 2022 Rio Open – Singles =

Singles
- 2022 Rio Open

Final
- Champion: (Spain) Carlos Alcaraz
- Runner-up: (Argentina) Diego Schwartzman
- Score: 6–4, 6–2

Details
- Draw: 28 (4 Q / 3 WC )
- Seeds: 8

Events
Singles	Doubles
- Rio Open

Carlos Alcaraz defeated Diego Schwartzman in the final, 6–4, 6–2 to win the singles title at the 2022 Rio Open. Alcaraz became the youngest winner of an ATP 500 event since the category was created in 2009.

Cristian Garín was the defending champion from when the event was last held in 2020, but lost to Federico Coria in the first round.

== Seeds ==
The top four seeds received a bye into the second round.

1. (Italy) Matteo Berrettini (quarterfinals)
2. (Norway) Casper Ruud (withdrew)
3. (Argentina) Diego Schwartzman (final)
4. (Spain) Pablo Carreño Busta (second round)
5. (Chile) Cristian Garín (first round)
6. (Italy) Lorenzo Sonego (second round)
7. (Spain) Carlos Alcaraz (champion)
8. (Spain) Albert Ramos Viñolas (second round)

== Draw ==
Key

- Q = Qualifier
- WC = Wild card
- LL = Lucky loser
- Alt = Alternate
- ITF = ITF entry
- PR = Protected ranking
- SR = Special ranking
- SE = Special exempt
- JE = Junior exempt
- JR = Junior Accelerator Programme entrant
- CO = College Accelerator Programme entrant
- NG = Next Gen Accelerator Program entrant
- w/o = Walkover
- r = Retired
- d = Defaulted

=== Finals ===
Semifinals
7	(Spain) Carlos Alcaraz	6	7
(Italy) Fabio Fognini	2	5
3	(Argentina) Diego Schwartzman	7^{7}	6
SE	(Argentina) Francisco Cerúndolo	6^{4}	3

Final
7	(Spain) Carlos Alcaraz	6	6
3	(Argentina) Diego Schwartzman	4	2

=== Top half ===
First round
Q	(Argentina) S Báez	6	4	4
WC	(Brazil) T Monteiro	1	6	6
Q	(Colombia) DE Galán	6	3	2
(Argentina) F Delbonis	3	6	6
(Spain) J Munar	6	2	1
7	(Spain) C Alcaraz	2	6	6
(Argentina) F Bagnis	2	4
(Italy) F Fognini	6	6
PR	(Spain) F Verdasco	7^{7}	6
(Serbia) D Lajović	6^{4}	3
(Argentina) F Coria	6	6
5	(Chile) C Garín	2	0

Second round
1	(Italy) M Berrettini	6	6^{6}	6
WC	(Brazil) T Monteiro	4	7^{8}	3
(Argentina) F Delbonis	4	6^{1}
7	(Spain) C Alcaraz	6	7^{7}
4	(Spain) P Carreño Busta	7	4	3
(Italy) F Fognini	5	6	6
PR	(Spain) F Verdasco	6^{2}	6	4
(Argentina) F Coria	7^{7}	4	6

Quarterfinals
1	(Italy) M Berrettini	2	6	2
7	(Spain) C Alcaraz	6	2	6
(Italy) F Fognini	6	6
(Argentina) F Coria	4	2

Semifinals
7	(Spain) C Alcaraz	6	7
(Italy) F Fognini	2	5

=== Bottom half ===
First round
8	(Spain) A Ramos Viñolas	6	6
Q	(Argentina) JI Londero	3	4
PR	(Uruguay) P Cuevas	6^{2}	5
PR	(Spain) P Andújar	7^{7}	7
WC	(China) J Shang	3	4
(Spain) P Martínez	6	6
6	(Italy) L Sonego	6	6
(Serbia) L Đere	2	0
WC	(Brazil) F Meligeni Alves	3	0
Q	(Serbia) M Kecmanović	6	6
SE	(Argentina) F Cerúndolo	6	4	6
(France) B Paire	3	6	2

Second round
8	(Spain) A Ramos Viñolas	5	7	3
PR	(Spain) P Andújar	7	5	6
(Spain) P Martínez	1	1
3	(Argentina) D Schwartzman	6	6
6	(Italy) L Sonego	5	4
Q	(Serbia) M Kecmanović	7	6
SE	(Argentina) F Cerúndolo	6	6
LL	(Spain) R Carballés Baena	3	2

Quarterfinals
PR	(Spain) P Andújar	6^{3}	6	4
3	(Argentina) D Schwartzman	7^{7}	4	6
Q	(Serbia) M Kecmanović	7	2	4
SE	(Argentina) F Cerúndolo	5	6	6

Semifinals
3	(Argentina) D Schwartzman	7^{7}	6
SE	(Argentina) F Cerúndolo	6^{4}	3

== Qualifying ==
=== Seeds ===
1. (Serbia) Miomir Kecmanović (qualified)
2. (Argentina) Sebastián Báez (qualified)
3. (Spain) Roberto Carballés Baena (qualifying competition, lucky loser)
4. (Italy) Marco Cecchinato (first round)
5. (Bolivia) Hugo Dellien (qualifying competition)
6. (Colombia) Daniel Elahi Galán (qualified)
7. (Spain) Carlos Taberner (first round)
8. (Germany) Yannick Hanfmann (qualifying competition)

=== Qualifiers ===
1. (Serbia) Miomir Kecmanović
2. (Argentina) Sebastián Báez
3. (Argentina) Juan Ignacio Londero
4. (Colombia) Daniel Elahi Galán

=== Lucky loser ===
1. (Spain) Roberto Carballés Baena

=== Qualifying draw ===
==== First qualifier ====
First round
1	(Serbia) Miomir Kecmanović	6	6
WC	(Brazil) Gustavo Heide	4	2
WC	(Brazil) Orlando Luz	0	1
5	(Bolivia) Hugo Dellien	6	6

Qualifying competition
1	(Serbia) Miomir Kecmanović	6	6
5	(Bolivia) Hugo Dellien	2	4

==== Second qualifier ====
First round
2	(Argentina) Sebastián Báez	6^{3}	6	6
Alt	(Serbia) Nikola Milojević	7^{7}	3	4
(Spain) Bernabé Zapata Miralles	2	4
8	(Germany) Yannick Hanfmann	6	6

Qualifying competition
2	(Argentina) Sebastián Báez	2	7^{7}	7^{7}
8	(Germany) Yannick Hanfmann	6	6^{2}	6^{2}

==== Third qualifier ====
First round
3	(Spain) Roberto Carballés Baena	7^{7}	7^{7}
(Brazil) Thiago Seyboth Wild	6^{4}	6^{3}
(Argentina) Juan Ignacio Londero	6	6
7	(Spain) Carlos Taberner	3	1

Qualifying competition
3	(Spain) Roberto Carballés Baena	2	4
(Argentina) Juan Ignacio Londero	6	6

==== Fourth qualifier ====
First round
4	(Italy) Marco Cecchinato	7^{7}	2	4
WC	(Brazil) Matheus Pucinelli de Almeida	6^{5}	6	6
(Argentina) Tomás Martín Etcheverry	3	2
6	(Colombia) Daniel Elahi Galán	6	6

Qualifying competition
WC	(Brazil) Matheus Pucinelli de Almeida	3	3
6	(Colombia) Daniel Elahi Galán	6	6
