= 2022 Monte-Carlo Masters – Singles =

Tennis tournament event

Singles
- 2022 Monte-Carlo Masters

Final
- Champion: (Greece) Stefanos Tsitsipas
- Runner-up: (Spain) Alejandro Davidovich Fokina
- Score: 6–3, 7–6^{(7–3)}

Details
- Draw: 56 (7 Q / 4 WC)
- Seeds: 16

Events
Singles	Doubles
← 2021 ·	Monte-Carlo Masters	· 2023 →

Defending champion Stefanos Tsitsipas defeated Alejandro Davidovich Fokina in the final, 6–3, 7–6^{(7–3)} to win the singles tennis title at the 2022 Monte-Carlo Masters. He became the sixth player to win consecutive titles at the Monte-Carlo Masters in the Open Era. The win also earned him his second Masters 1000 title and his eighth career singles title overall.

Former world No. 1 and eleven-time Monte-Carlo Masters champion Rafael Nadal did not compete due to a stress fracture in his rib. This marked the first edition of the tournament not to feature Nadal in the main draw since 2004.

== Seeds ==
The top eight seeds received a bye into the second round.

1. (Serbia) Novak Djokovic (second round)
2. (Germany) Alexander Zverev (semifinals)
3. (Greece) Stefanos Tsitsipas (champion)
4. (Norway) Casper Ruud (third round)
5. Andrey Rublev (third round)
6. (Canada) Félix Auger-Aliassime (second round)
7. (United Kingdom) Cameron Norrie (second round)
8. (Spain) Carlos Alcaraz (second round)
9. (Italy) Jannik Sinner (quarterfinals)
10. (United States) Taylor Fritz (quarterfinals)
11. (Poland) Hubert Hurkacz (quarterfinals)
12. (Argentina) Diego Schwartzman (quarterfinals)
13. (Spain) Pablo Carreño Busta (third round)
14. (Spain) Roberto Bautista Agut (withdrew)
15. (Georgia (country)) Nikoloz Basilashvili (first round, retired)
16. (Italy) Lorenzo Sonego (second round)

Click on the seed number of a player to go to their draw section.

== Draw ==
=== Key ===
- Q = Qualifier
- WC = Wild card
- LL = Lucky loser
- Alt = Alternate
- SE = Special exempt
- PR = Protected ranking
- ITF = ITF entry
- JE = Junior exempt
- w/o = Walkover
- r = Retired
- d = Defaulted
- SR = Special ranking

=== Finals ===
Quarterfinals
(Spain) Alejandro Davidovich Fokina	2	6	6
10	(United States) Taylor Fritz	6	4	3
(Bulgaria) Grigor Dimitrov	6	3	7^{7}
11	(Poland) Hubert Hurkacz	4	6	6^{2}
12	(Argentina) Diego Schwartzman	2	7^{7}	4
3	(Greece) Stefanos Tsitsipas	6	6^{3}	6
9	(Italy) Jannik Sinner	7	3	6^{5}
2	(Germany) Alexander Zverev	5	6	7^{7}

Semifinals
(Spain) Alejandro Davidovich Fokina	6	6^{2}	6
(Bulgaria) Grigor Dimitrov	4	7^{7}	3
3	(Greece) Stefanos Tsitsipas	6	6
2	(Germany) Alexander Zverev	4	2

Final
(Spain) Alejandro Davidovich Fokina	3	6^{3}
3	(Greece) Stefanos Tsitsipas	6	7^{7}

=== Top half ===
==== Section 1 ====
First round
(Spain) A Davidovich Fokina	7	6
(United States) M Giron	5	3
WC	(Belgium) D Goffin	6	6
Q	(Czech Republic) J Lehečka	4	3
(United Kingdom) D Evans	6	7^{7}
LL	(France) B Bonzi	0	6^{4}
10	(United States) T Fritz	6^{6}	7^{7}	6
WC	(Monaco) L Catarina	7^{8}	6^{5}	4
WC	(France) J-W Tsonga	2	2
(Croatia) M Čilić	6	6
(United States) S Korda	7	6
(Netherlands) B van de Zandschulp	5	4

Second round
1	(Serbia) N Djokovic	3	7^{7}	1
(Spain) A Davidovich Fokina	6	6^{5}	6
WC	(Belgium) D Goffin	7^{7}	6
(United Kingdom) D Evans	6^{5}	2
10	(United States) T Fritz	6	4	6
(Croatia) M Čilić	3	6	4
(United States) S Korda	7^{7}	6^{5}	6
8	(Spain) C Alcaraz	6^{2}	7^{7}	3

Third round
(Spain) A Davidovich Fokina	6	6
WC	(Belgium) D Goffin	4	1
10	(United States) T Fritz	7^{7}	7
(United States) S Korda	6^{4}	5

Quarterfinals
(Spain) A Davidovich Fokina	2	6	6
10	(United States) T Fritz	6	4	3

==== Section 2 ====
First round
Q	(Denmark) H Rune	7^{7}	4	6
A Karatsev	6^{1}	6	3
(Serbia) D Lajović	6	7^{7}
(Serbia) F Krajinović	2	6^{4}
(Bulgaria) G Dimitrov	6	2
15	(Georgia (country)) N Basilashvili	3	0^{r}
11	(Poland) H Hurkacz	7	6
Q	(Bolivia) H Dellien	5	4
(Spain) P Martínez	6	7^{7}
(France) U Humbert	4	6^{5}
(Spain) A Ramos Viñolas	6	4	6
(Netherlands) T Griekspoor	4	6	2

Second round
4	(Norway) C Ruud	7^{7}	7
Q	(Denmark) H Rune	6^{5}	5
(Serbia) D Lajović	6	3	2
(Bulgaria) G Dimitrov	4	6	6
11	(Poland) H Hurkacz	6	4	6
(Spain) P Martínez	3	6	4
(Spain) A Ramos Viñolas	6	2	6
7	(United Kingdom) C Norrie	4	6	4

Third round
4	(Norway) C Ruud	3	5
(Bulgaria) G Dimitrov	6	7
11	(Poland) H Hurkacz	7^{7}	6
(Spain) A Ramos Viñolas	6^{2}	2

Quarterfinals
(Bulgaria) G Dimitrov	6	3	7^{7}
11	(Poland) H Hurkacz	4	6	6^{2}

=== Bottom half ===
==== Section 3 ====
First round
(Italy) L Musetti	6	6^{4}	6
(France) B Paire	2	7^{7}	2
(Hungary) M Fucsovics	6	6^{5}	6
(South Africa) L Harris	4	7^{7}	1
K Khachanov	7^{7}	3	3
12	(Argentina) D Schwartzman	6^{5}	6	6
16	(Italy) L Sonego	6	6
I Ivashka	3	3
LL	(United States) M Cressy	4	7^{9}	2
(Serbia) L Đere	6	6^{7}	6
(Italy) F Fognini	7	4	6
(France) A Rinderknech	5	6	3

Second round
6	(Canada) F Auger-Aliassime	2	6^{2}
(Italy) L Musetti	6	7^{7}
(Hungary) M Fucsovics	0	6^{4}
12	(Argentina) D Schwartzman	6	7^{7}
16	(Italy) L Sonego	4	4
(Serbia) L Đere	6	6
(Italy) F Fognini	3	0
3	(Greece) S Tsitsipas	6	6

Third round
(Italy) L Musetti	6	4	3
12	(Argentina) D Schwartzman	2	6	6
(Serbia) L Đere	5	6^{1}
3	(Greece) S Tsitsipas	7	7^{7}

Quarterfinals
12	(Argentina) D Schwartzman	2	7^{7}	4
3	(Greece) S Tsitsipas	6	6^{3}	6

==== Section 4 ====
First round
(Australia) A de Minaur	6	6
Q	(Spain) B Zapata Miralles	3	4
Q	(Finland) E Ruusuvuori	6	6
LL	(Germany) O Otte	4	3
PR	(Croatia) B Ćorić	3	6	3
9	(Italy) J Sinner	6	2	6
13	(Spain) P Carreño Busta	6	4	6
Q	(Argentina) S Báez	4	6	2
WC	(Switzerland) S Wawrinka	6	5	2
(Kazakhstan) A Bublik	3	7	6
Q	(Spain) J Munar	4	6	4
(Argentina) F Delbonis	6	3	6

Second round
5	A Rublev	2	6	6
(Australia) A de Minaur	6	1	4
Q	(Finland) E Ruusuvuori	5	3
9	(Italy) J Sinner	7	6
13	(Spain) P Carreño Busta	4	7^{7}	4
(Kazakhstan) A Bublik	6	6^{3}	3^{r}
(Argentina) F Delbonis	1	5
2	(Germany) A Zverev	6	7

Third round
5	A Rublev	7	1	3
9	(Italy) J Sinner	5	6	6
13	(Spain) P Carreño Busta	2	5
2	(Germany) A Zverev	6	7

Quarterfinals
9	(Italy) J Sinner	7	3	6^{5}
2	(Germany) A Zverev	5	6	7^{7}

== Other entry information ==
=== Wildcards ===
- (Monaco) Lucas Catarina
- (Belgium) David Goffin
- (France) Jo-Wilfried Tsonga
- (Switzerland) Stan Wawrinka

=== Protected ranking ===
- (Croatia) Borna Ćorić

=== Qualifiers ===
- (Argentina) Sebastián Báez
- (Bolivia) Hugo Dellien
- (Czech Republic) Jiří Lehečka
- (Spain) Jaume Munar
- (Denmark) Holger Rune
- (Finland) Emil Ruusuvuori
- (Spain) Bernabé Zapata Miralles

=== Lucky losers ===
- (France) Benjamin Bonzi
- (United States) Maxime Cressy
- (Germany) Oscar Otte

=== Withdrawals ===
- (Spain) Roberto Bautista Agut → replaced by (France) Benjamin Bonzi
- (Italy) Matteo Berrettini → replaced by (France) Arthur Rinderknech
- (Chile) Cristian Garín → replaced by (Germany) Oscar Otte
- (Germany) Dominik Koepfer → replaced by (United States) Marcos Giron
- Daniil Medvedev → replaced by (Netherlands) Tallon Griekspoor
- (France) Gaël Monfils → replaced by (United States) Maxime Cressy
- (Spain) Rafael Nadal → replaced by (France) Benoît Paire
- (Austria) Dominic Thiem → replaced by (Italy) Lorenzo Musetti

== Qualifying ==
=== Seeds ===
1. (France) Benjamin Bonzi (qualifying competition, lucky loser)
2. (France) Hugo Gaston (first round)
3. (South Korea) Kwon Soon-woo (first round)
4. (Argentina) Sebastián Báez (qualified)
5. (France) Adrian Mannarino (first round)
6. (United States) Maxime Cressy (qualifying competition, lucky loser)
7. (Germany) Oscar Otte (qualifying competition, lucky loser)

8. (Australia) John Millman (first round)
9. (Poland) Kamil Majchrzak (qualifying competition)
10. (Spain) Jaume Munar (qualified)
11. (Finland) Emil Ruusuvuori (qualified)
12. (Switzerland) Henri Laaksonen (first round)
13. (Portugal) João Sousa (qualifying competition)
14. (Denmark) Holger Rune (qualified)

Click on the seed number of a player to go to their draw section.

=== Qualifiers ===
1. (Czech Republic) Jiří Lehečka
2. (Finland) Emil Ruusuvuori
3. (Spain) Bernabé Zapata Miralles
4. (Argentina) Sebastián Báez
5. (Bolivia) Hugo Dellien
6. (Denmark) Holger Rune
7. (Spain) Jaume Munar

=== Lucky losers ===
1. (United States) Maxime Cressy
2. (France) Benjamin Bonzi
3. (Germany) Oscar Otte

=== Draw ===
==== First qualifier ====
First round
1	(France) Benjamin Bonzi	6	6
Alt	(Italy) Stefano Travaglia	3	3
(Czech Republic) Jiří Lehečka	6^{0}	6	6
12	(Switzerland) Henri Laaksonen	7^{7}	4	2

Qualifying competition
1	(France) Benjamin Bonzi	4	3
(Czech Republic) Jiří Lehečka	6	6

==== Second qualifier ====
First round
2	(France) Hugo Gaston	4	2
WC	(Italy) Flavio Cobolli	6	6
(Italy) Gianluca Mager	3	5
11	(Finland) Emil Ruusuvuori	6	7

Qualifying competition
WC	(Italy) Flavio Cobolli	6	4	3
11	(Finland) Emil Ruusuvuori	4	6	6

==== Third qualifier ====
First round
3	(South Korea) Kwon Soon-woo	7^{7}	4	2
Alt	(Spain) Bernabé Zapata Miralles	6^{5}	6	6
(Spain) Carlos Taberner	1	1
13	(Portugal) João Sousa	6	6

Qualifying competition
Alt	(Spain) Bernabé Zapata Miralles	6	7^{10}
13	(Portugal) João Sousa	4	6^{8}

==== Fourth qualifier ====
First round
4	(Argentina) Sebastián Báez	6^{4}	6	7^{8}
(Italy) Marco Cecchinato	7^{7}	1	6^{6}
(Sweden) Mikael Ymer	2	6	4
9	(Poland) Kamil Majchrzak	6	4	6

Qualifying competition
4	(Argentina) Sebastián Báez	6	4	6
9	(Poland) Kamil Majchrzak	1	6	1

==== Fifth qualifier ====
First round
5	(France) Adrian Mannarino	1	6	5
(Bolivia) Hugo Dellien	6	4	7
Alt	(Japan) Taro Daniel	6	6
8	(Australia) John Millman	2	3

Qualifying competition
(Bolivia) Hugo Dellien	6	6^{9}	6
Alt	(Japan) Taro Daniel	4	7^{11}	3

==== Sixth qualifier ====
First round
6	(United States) Maxime Cressy	6	6
WC	(France) Luca Van Assche	3	4
Alt	(Moldova) Radu Albot	2	3
14	(Denmark) Holger Rune	6	6

Qualifying competition
6	(United States) Maxime Cressy	3	5
14	(Denmark) Holger Rune	6	7

==== Seventh qualifier ====
First round
7	(Germany) Oscar Otte	6	7^{7}
WC	(Monaco) Valentin Vacherot	4	6^{3}
WC	(Monaco) Hugo Nys	2	2
10	(Spain) Jaume Munar	6	6

Qualifying competition
7	(Germany) Oscar Otte	0	7^{10}	2
10	(Spain) Jaume Munar	6	6^{8}	6
