= 2022 Rio Open =

Professional men's tennis tournament played on outdoor clay courts

- Date: 14–20 February
- Edition: 8th
- Draw: 28S / 16D
- Prize money: $1,660,290
- Surface: Clay - outdoor
- Location: Rio de Janeiro, Brazil
- Venue: Jockey Club Brasileiro

Champions

Singles
- (Spain) Carlos Alcaraz

Doubles
- (Italy) Simone Bolelli / (Italy) Fabio Fognini
- Rio Open

The 2022 Rio Open, also known as Rio Open presented by Claro for sponsorship reasons, was a professional men's tennis tournament played on outdoor clay courts. It was the 8th edition of the Rio Open, and part of the ATP Tour 500 of the 2022 ATP Tour. It took place in Rio de Janeiro, Brazil between February 14–20, 2022.

== Champions ==
=== Singles ===
- (Spain) Carlos Alcaraz def. (Argentina) Diego Schwartzman 6–4, 6–2

=== Doubles ===
- (Italy) Simone Bolelli / (Italy) Fabio Fognini def. (United Kingdom) Jamie Murray / (Brazil) Bruno Soares 7–5, 6–7^{(2–7)}, [10–6]

== Points and prize money ==
=== Point distribution ===
Event	W	F	SF	QF	Round of 16	Round of 32	Q	Q2	Q1
Singles	500	300	180	90	45	0	20	10	0
Doubles	500	300	180	90	0	—N/a	—N/a	—N/a	—N/a

=== Prize money ===
Event	W	F	SF	QF	Round of 16	Round of 32	Q2	Q1
Singles	$317,400	$169,985	$90,650	$48,570	$25,900	$13,760	$7,285	$4,000
Doubles*	$102,210	$54,390	$27,520	$13,760	$6,960	—N/a	—N/a	—N/a

_{*per team}

== Singles main-draw entrants ==
=== Seeds ===
Country	Player	Rank^{1}	Seed
ITA	Matteo Berrettini	6	1
~~NOR~~	~~Casper Ruud~~	~~8~~	~~2~~
ARG	Diego Schwartzman	15	3
ESP	Pablo Carreño Busta	16	4
CHI	Cristian Garín	20	5
ITA	Lorenzo Sonego	22	6
ESP	Carlos Alcaraz	29	7
ESP	Albert Ramos Viñolas	32	8

- ^{1} Rankings are as of February 7, 2022.

=== Other entrants ===
The following players received wildcards into the singles main draw:

- (Brazil) Felipe Meligeni Alves
- (Brazil) Thiago Monteiro
- (China) Shang Juncheng

The following player received a special exempt into the main draw:

- (Argentina) Francisco Cerúndolo

The following players received entry using a protected ranking into the singles main draw:

- (Spain) Pablo Andújar
- (Uruguay) Pablo Cuevas
- (Spain) Fernando Verdasco

The following players received entry from the qualifying draw:

- (Argentina) Sebastián Báez
- (Colombia) Daniel Elahi Galán
- (Serbia) Miomir Kecmanović
- (Argentina) Juan Ignacio Londero

The following players received entry as a lucky loser:

- (Spain) Roberto Carballés Baena

=== Withdrawals ===
Before the tournament

- (Austria) Dominic Thiem → replaced by (Uruguay) Pablo Cuevas
- (Norway) Casper Ruud → replaced by (Spain) Roberto Carballés Baena

== Doubles main-draw entrants ==
=== Seeds ===
Country	Player	Country	Player	Rank^{1}	Seed
ESP	Marcel Granollers	ARG	Horacio Zeballos	13	1
COL	Juan Sebastián Cabal	COL	Robert Farah	22	2
GBR	Jamie Murray	BRA	Bruno Soares	37	3
URU	Ariel Behar	ECU	Gonzalo Escobar	85	4

- ^{1} Rankings as of February 7, 2022.

=== Other entrants ===
The following pairs received wildcards into the doubles main draw:

- (Brazil) Rogério Dutra Silva / (Brazil) Orlando Luz
- (Brazil) Rafael Matos / (Brazil) Felipe Meligeni Alves

The following pair received entry from the qualifying draw:

- (Spain) Pablo Andújar / (Spain) Pedro Martínez

=== Withdrawals ===
Before the tournament

- (Serbia) Dušan Lajović / (Croatia) Franko Škugor → replaced by (Serbia) Laslo Đere / (Serbia) Dušan Lajović

During the tournament

- (Spain) Carlos Alcaraz / (Spain) Pablo Carreño Busta
