= 2022 Barcelona Open Banc Sabadell – Singles =

Singles
- 2022 Barcelona Open Banc Sabadell

Final
- Champion: (Spain) Carlos Alcaraz
- Runner-up: (Spain) Pablo Carreño Busta
- Score: 6–3, 6–2

Details
- Draw: 48 (6 Q / 4 WC )
- Seeds: 16

Events
| Singles | Doubles |
- Barcelona Open

Carlos Alcaraz defeated Pablo Carreño Busta in the final, 6–3, 6–2 to win the singles tennis title at the 2022 Barcelona Open. Alcaraz saved two match points en route to the title, in the semifinals against Alex de Minaur. With the win, on 25 April 2022, Alcaraz entered the top-10 in rankings for the first time in his career, becoming the youngest man to do so since Rafael Nadal made his own top-10 debut exactly 17 years earlier on 25 April 2005.

Nadal was the reigning champion, but withdrew before the tournament to recover from a rib injury.

This tournament marked the final professional appearance of former world No. 5 Tommy Robredo, who made his ATP Tour debut at the same tournament in 1999.

== Seeds ==
All seeds receive a bye into the second round.

1. (Greece) Stefanos Tsitsipas (quarterfinals)
2. (Norway) Casper Ruud (quarterfinals)
3. (Canada) Félix Auger-Aliassime (quarterfinals)
4. (United Kingdom) Cameron Norrie (quarterfinals)
5. (Spain) Carlos Alcaraz (champion)
6. (Argentina) Diego Schwartzman (semifinals)
7. (Spain) Roberto Bautista Agut (withdrew)
8. (Spain) Pablo Carreño Busta (final)
9. (Georgia (country)) Nikoloz Basilashvili (second round)

10. (Australia) Alex de Minaur (semifinals)
11. (Italy) Lorenzo Sonego (third round)
12. (United Kingdom) Dan Evans (second round)
13. (United States) Frances Tiafoe (third round)
14. (Bulgaria) Grigor Dimitrov (third round)
15. (Argentina) Federico Delbonis (second round)
16. (Kazakhstan) Alexander Bublik (second round)
17. (Spain) Albert Ramos Viñolas (second round)

Click on the seed number of a player to go to their draw section.

== Draw ==
Key

- Q = Qualifier
- WC = Wild card
- LL = Lucky loser
- Alt = Alternate
- ITF = ITF entry
- PR = Protected ranking
- SR = Special ranking
- SE = Special exempt
- JE = Junior exempt
- JR = Junior Accelerator Programme entrant
- CO = College Accelerator Programme entrant
- NG = Next Gen Accelerator Program entrant
- w/o = Walkover
- r = Retired
- d = Defaulted

=== Finals ===
Quarterfinals
1 | (Greece) Stefanos Tsitsipas | 4 | 7 | 2
5 | (Spain) Carlos Alcaraz | 6 | 5 | 6
4 | (United Kingdom) Cameron Norrie | 3 | 7 | 1
10 | (Australia) Alex de Minaur | 6 | 5 | 6
6 | (Argentina) Diego Schwartzman | 3 | 6 | 6
3/WC | (Canada) Félix Auger-Aliassime | 6 | 2 | 3
8 | (Spain) Pablo Carreño Busta | 4 | 7^{10} | 6
2 | (Norway) Casper Ruud | 6 | 6^{8} | 3

Semifinals
5 | (Spain) Carlos Alcaraz | 6^{4} | 7^{7} | 6
10 | (Australia) Alex de Minaur | 7^{7} | 6^{4} | 4
6 | (Argentina) Diego Schwartzman | 3 | 4
8 | (Spain) Pablo Carreño Busta | 6 | 6

Final
5 | (Spain) Carlos Alcaraz | 6 | 6
8 | (Spain) Pablo Carreño Busta | 3 | 2

=== Top half ===
==== Section 1 ====
First round
I Ivashka | 6 | 7^{7}
(Spain) P Martínez | 4 | 6^{4}
(United States) M Giron | 2 | 6 | 1
(Argentina) F Coria | 6 | 3 | 6
WC | (Spain) J Munar | 6 | 6
LL | (Italy) GM Moroni | 2 | 4
(South Korea) S-w Kwon | 6 | 6
(France) B Paire | 4 | 4

Second round
1 | (Greece) S Tsitsipas | 6 | 4 | 6
I Ivashka | 1 | 6 | 2
(Argentina) F Coria | 6 | 3 | 4
14 | (Bulgaria) G Dimitrov | 4 | 6 | 6
9 | (Georgia (country)) N Basilashvili | 1 | 4
WC | (Spain) J Munar | 6 | 6
(South Korea) S-w Kwon | 1 | 6 | 2
5 | (Spain) C Alcaraz | 6 | 2 | 6

Third round
1 | (Greece) S Tsitsipas | 6 | 6
14 | (Bulgaria) G Dimitrov | 1 | 4
WC | (Spain) J Munar | 3 | 3
5 | (Spain) C Alcaraz | 6 | 6

Quarterfinals
1 | (Greece) S Tsitsipas | 4 | 7 | 2
5 | (Spain) C Alcaraz | 6 | 5 | 6

==== Section 2 ====
First round
(France) A Mannarino | 6 | 3 | 4
Q | E Gerasimov | 2 | 6 | 6
(Hungary) M Fucsovics | 6 | 6
(Australia) J Thompson | 4 | 2
(Spain) P Andújar | 4 | 3
(France) U Humbert | 6 | 6
(South Africa) L Harris | 6 | 7^{7}
(Spain) R Carballés Baena | 4 | 6^{0}

Second round
4 | (United Kingdom) C Norrie | 5 | 6 | 6
Q | E Gerasimov | 7 | 4 | 4
(Hungary) M Fucsovics | 6 | 6
15 | (Argentina) F Delbonis | 2 | 1
10 | (Australia) A de Minaur | 6 | 4 | 6
(France) U Humbert | 3 | 6 | 3
(South Africa) L Harris | 6 | 6
17 | (Spain) A Ramos Viñolas | 3 | 4

Third round
4 | (United Kingdom) C Norrie | 7 | 6^{9} | 6
(Hungary) M Fucsovics | 5 | 7^{11} | 4
10 | (Australia) A de Minaur | 6 | 0
(South Africa) L Harris | 0 | 0^{r}

Quarterfinals
4 | (United Kingdom) C Norrie | 3 | 7 | 1
10 | (Australia) A de Minaur | 6 | 5 | 6

=== Bottom half ===
==== Section 3 ====
First round
LL | (France) H Grenier | 7^{7} | 1 | 6^{2}
(United States) M McDonald | 6^{2} | 6 | 7^{7}
(Italy) L Musetti | 7 | 7
(Argentina) S Báez | 5 | 5
Q | (Bolivia) H Dellien | 6 | 7
LL | (France) M Guinard | 4 | 5
Q | (Spain) C Taberner | 6 | 6
(United States) S Korda | 3 | 0

Second round
6 | (Argentina) D Schwartzman | 6 | 6
(United States) M McDonald | 2 | 2
(Italy) L Musetti | 6 | 7^{10}
12 | (United Kingdom) D Evans | 4 | 6^{8}
13 | (United States) F Tiafoe | 7^{7} | 6
Q | (Bolivia) H Dellien | 6^{3} | 1
Q | (Spain) C Taberner | 1 | 6 | 4
3/WC | (Canada) F Auger-Aliassime | 6 | 3 | 6

Third round
6 | (Argentina) D Schwartzman | 6 | 7
(Italy) L Musetti | 4 | 5
13 | (United States) F Tiafoe | 5 | 4
3/WC | (Canada) F Auger-Aliassime | 7 | 6

Quarterfinals
6 | (Argentina) D Schwartzman | 3 | 6 | 6
3/WC | (Canada) F Auger-Aliassime | 6 | 2 | 3

==== Section 4 ====
First round
Q | (Spain) B Zapata Miralles | 6 | 6
WC | (Spain) T Robredo | 1 | 1
(United States) M Cressy | 3 | 0
Q | (Sweden) E Ymer | 6 | 6
WC | (Spain) F López | 0 | 1
(Finland) E Ruusuvuori | 6 | 6
Q | (Spain) N Álvarez Varona | 6^{6} | 3
(United States) B Nakashima | 7^{8} | 6

Second round
8 | (Spain) P Carreño Busta | 6 | 6
Q | (Spain) B Zapata Miralles | 3 | 3
Q | (Sweden) E Ymer | 4 | 2
11 | (Italy) L Sonego | 6 | 6
16 | (Kazakhstan) A Bublik | 3 | 1
(Finland) E Ruusuvuori | 6 | 6
(United States) B Nakashima | 3 | 2
2 | (Norway) C Ruud | 6 | 6

Third round
8 | (Spain) P Carreño Busta | 6 | 5 | 6
11 | (Italy) L Sonego | 2 | 7 | 2
(Finland) E Ruusuvuori | 2 | 2
2 | (Norway) C Ruud | 6 | 6

Quarterfinals
8 | (Spain) P Carreño Busta | 4 | 7^{10} | 6
2 | (Norway) C Ruud | 6 | 6^{8} | 3

== Other entry information ==
=== Wildcards ===
- (Canada) Félix Auger-Aliassime
- (Spain) Feliciano López
- (Spain) Jaume Munar
- (Spain) Tommy Robredo

=== Withdrawals ===
- (Spain) Roberto Bautista Agut → replaced by (France) Hugo Grenier
- (Spain) Alejandro Davidovich Fokina → replaced by (France) Manuel Guinard
- (Netherlands) Tallon Griekspoor → replaced by (United States) Maxime Cressy
- (Poland) Hubert Hurkacz → replaced by (Italy) Lorenzo Musetti
- (Spain) Rafael Nadal → replaced by (South Korea) Kwon Soon-woo
- (France) Arthur Rinderknech → replaced by (Italy) Gian Marco Moroni
- (Canada) Denis Shapovalov → replaced by (Spain) Pablo Andújar
- (Italy) Jannik Sinner → replaced by (Australia) Jordan Thompson
- (Germany) Jan-Lennard Struff → replaced by (Argentina) Sebastián Báez
- (Netherlands) Botic van de Zandschulp → replaced by (Spain) Roberto Carballés Baena

== Qualifying ==
=== Seeds ===
1. (Bolivia) Hugo Dellien (qualified)
2. (Spain) Carlos Taberner (qualified)
3. (Australia) Alexei Popyrin (first round)
4. (Germany) Peter Gojowczyk (first round, retired)
5. (Italy) Gianluca Mager (first round)
6. (Spain) Bernabé Zapata Miralles (qualified)
7. (Germany) Philipp Kohlschreiber (first round)
8. (Sweden) Elias Ymer (qualified)
9. (France) Pierre-Hugues Herbert (first round)
10. Egor Gerasimov (qualified)
11. (France) Hugo Grenier (qualifying competition, lucky loser)
12. (France) Manuel Guinard (qualifying competition, lucky loser)

=== Qualifiers ===
1. (Bolivia) Hugo Dellien
2. (Spain) Carlos Taberner
3. Egor Gerasimov
4. (Spain) Nicolás Álvarez Varona
5. (Sweden) Elias Ymer
6. (Spain) Bernabé Zapata Miralles

=== Lucky losers ===
1. (France) Hugo Grenier
2. (France) Manuel Guinard
3. (Italy) Gian Marco Moroni

=== Draw ===
==== First qualifier ====
First round
1 | (Bolivia) Hugo Dellien | 6 | 6
WC | (Spain) Daniel Rincón | 3 | 0
(Italy) Gian Marco Moroni | 6 | 6
9 | (France) Pierre-Hugues Herbert | 3 | 1

Qualifying competition
1 | (Bolivia) Hugo Dellien | 7 | 6
(Italy) Gian Marco Moroni | 5 | 2

==== Second qualifier ====
First round
2 | (Spain) Carlos Taberner | 6 | 6
(France) Maxime Janvier | 2 | 0
(Spain) Nikolás Sánchez Izquierdo | 2 | 2
11 | (France) Hugo Grenier | 6 | 6

Qualifying competition
2 | (Spain) Carlos Taberner | 6 | 6
11 | (France) Hugo Grenier | 2 | 1

==== Third qualifier ====
First round
3 | (Australia) Alexei Popyrin | 4 | 2
(Italy) Andrea Pellegrino | 6 | 6
(Italy) Raúl Brancaccio | 3 | 2
10 | Egor Gerasimov | 6 | 6

Qualifying competition
(Italy) Andrea Pellegrino | 2 | 3
10 | Egor Gerasimov | 6 | 6

==== Fourth qualifier ====
First round
4 | (Germany) Peter Gojowczyk | 3 | 0^{r}
WC | (Spain) Max Alcalá Gurri | 6 | 0
WC | (Spain) Nicolás Álvarez Varona | 3 | 7 | 7^{7}
7 | (Germany) Philipp Kohlschreiber | 6 | 5 | 6^{3}

Qualifying competition
WC | (Spain) Max Alcalá Gurri | 4 | 3
WC | (Spain) Nicolás Álvarez Varona | 6 | 6

==== Fifth qualifier ====
First round
5 | (Italy) Gianluca Mager | 7 | 6^{5} | 3
(Portugal) Pedro Sousa | 5 | 7^{7} | 6
WC | (Spain) Carlos Gimeno Valero | 2 | 6 | 3
8 | (Sweden) Elias Ymer | 6 | 2 | 6

Qualifying competition
(Portugal) Pedro Sousa | 3 | 2
8 | (Sweden) Elias Ymer | 6 | 6

==== Sixth qualifier ====
First round
6 | (Spain) Bernabé Zapata Miralles | 6 | 6
Alt | (France) Alexis Gautier | 1 | 1
(Ukraine) Vitaliy Sachko | 3 | 3
12 | (France) Manuel Guinard | 6 | 6

Qualifying competition
6 | (Spain) Bernabé Zapata Miralles | 6 | 6
12 | (France) Manuel Guinard | 4 | 0
