= 2023 ITF Men's World Tennis Tour (July–September) =

2023 edition of the third-tier tour for men's professional tennis

The 2023 ITF Men's World Tennis Tour is the 2023 edition of the second-tier tour for men's professional tennis. It is organised by the International Tennis Federation and is a tier below the ATP Challenger Tour. The ITF Men's World Tennis Tour includes tournaments with prize money ranging from $15,000 to $25,000.

Since 2022, following the Russian invasion of Ukraine the ITF announced that players from Belarus and Russia could still play on the tour but would not be allowed to play under the flag of Belarus or Russia.

== Key ==
M25 tournaments
M15 tournaments

== Month ==
=== July ===
Week of	Tournament	Winner	Runners-up	Semifinalists	Quarterfinalists
July 3	Biella, Italy; Clay; M25; Singles and Doubles Draws	(Italy) Stefano Napolitano; 6–4, 6–0	(Italy) Lorenzo Carboni	(France) Clément Tabur (France) Maxime Chazal	(Italy) Lorenzo Bocchi (Italy) Luigi Sorrentino (Brazil) João Eduardo Schiessl (Italy) Luca Castagnola
July 3	Biella, Italy; Clay; M25; Singles and Doubles Draws	(Switzerland) Louroi Martinez (Switzerland) Nicolás Parizzia; 6–4, 3–6, [10–7]	(Italy) Federico Valle (Italy) Samuel Vincent Ruggeri	(France) Clément Tabur (France) Maxime Chazal	(Italy) Lorenzo Bocchi (Italy) Luigi Sorrentino (Brazil) João Eduardo Schiessl (Italy) Luca Castagnola
July 3	The Hague, Netherlands; Clay; M25; Singles and Doubles Draws	(Netherlands) Max Houkes; 3–6, 6–3, 6–3	(Netherlands) Guy den Ouden	(Ukraine) Eric Vanshelboim (Netherlands) Deney Wassermann	(Netherlands) Ryan Nijboer (Netherlands) Guy den Heijer (Netherlands) Sander Jong (Georgia (country)) Zura Tkemaladze
July 3	The Hague, Netherlands; Clay; M25; Singles and Doubles Draws	(Israel) Roy Stepanov (Ukraine) Eric Vanshelboim; 7–5, 7–6^{(7–3)}	(Ukraine) Aleksandr Braynin (Spain) Iván Marrero Curbelo	(Ukraine) Eric Vanshelboim (Netherlands) Deney Wassermann	(Netherlands) Ryan Nijboer (Netherlands) Guy den Heijer (Netherlands) Sander Jong (Georgia (country)) Zura Tkemaladze
July 3	Marburg, Germany; Clay; M25; Singles and Doubles Draws	(Germany) Timo Stodder; 6–4, 6–3	(Germany) Louis Wessels	(Germany) Adrian Oetzbach (United States) Alex Rybakov	(Serbia) Stefan Popović (Czech Republic) Martin Krumich (Bosnia and Herzegovina) Aldin Šetkić (Czech Republic) Dominik Reček
July 3	Marburg, Germany; Clay; M25; Singles and Doubles Draws	(Slovakia) Lukáš Pokorný (Germany) Timo Stodder; 6–4, 6–1	(Czech Republic) Dominik Reček (Czech Republic) Daniel Siniakov	(Germany) Adrian Oetzbach (United States) Alex Rybakov	(Serbia) Stefan Popović (Czech Republic) Martin Krumich (Bosnia and Herzegovina) Aldin Šetkić (Czech Republic) Dominik Reček
July 3	Klosters, Switzerland; Clay; M25; Singles and Doubles Draws	(United States) Oliver Crawford; 6–1, 6–3	(Switzerland) Damien Wenger	(Zimbabwe) Benjamin Lock (United States) Toby Kodat	(Croatia) Mili Poljičak (Switzerland) Mika Brunold (France) Gabriel Debru (Switzerland) Jérôme Kym
July 3	Klosters, Switzerland; Clay; M25; Singles and Doubles Draws	(Croatia) Mili Poljičak (Switzerland) Damien Wenger; 6–2, 6–4	(Germany) Patrick Zahraj (Germany) Leopold Zima	(Zimbabwe) Benjamin Lock (United States) Toby Kodat	(Croatia) Mili Poljičak (Switzerland) Mika Brunold (France) Gabriel Debru (Switzerland) Jérôme Kym
July 3	Ajaccio, France; Hard; M25+H; Singles and Doubles Draws	(France) Jules Marie; 6–4, 6–4	(France) Lucas Poullain	(Switzerland) Antoine Bellier (France) Lilian Marmousez	(France) Dan Added (France) Arthur Bouquier (France) Antoine Hoang (Ivory Coast) Eliakim Coulibaly
July 3	Ajaccio, France; Hard; M25+H; Singles and Doubles Draws	(United Kingdom) Patrick Brady (United Kingdom) Oscar Weightman; 6–4, 3–6, [10–6]	(France) Guillaume Dalmasso (France) Pierre Antoine Tailleu	(Switzerland) Antoine Bellier (France) Lilian Marmousez	(France) Dan Added (France) Arthur Bouquier (France) Antoine Hoang (Ivory Coast) Eliakim Coulibaly
July 3	Getxo, Spain; Clay; M25; Singles and Doubles Draws	(Spain) Javier Barranco Cosano; 7–6^{(7–2)}, 6–4	(Spain) Iñaki Montes de la Torre	(Spain) Alex Martínez (Spain) Imanol López Morillo	Andrey Chepelev (Lithuania) Vilius Gaubas (Spain) Daniel Mérida (United Kingdom) Felix Gill
July 3	Getxo, Spain; Clay; M25; Singles and Doubles Draws	(Spain) Alex Martínez (Spain) Iñaki Montes de la Torre; 7–6^{(7–1)}, 6–2	(Greece) Dimitris Sakellaridis (Greece) Stefanos Sakellaridis	(Spain) Alex Martínez (Spain) Imanol López Morillo	Andrey Chepelev (Lithuania) Vilius Gaubas (Spain) Daniel Mérida (United Kingdom) Felix Gill
July 3	Brașov, Romania; Clay; M25; Singles and Doubles Draws	(Sweden) Dragoș Nicolae Mădăraș; 6–3, 6–3	(Romania) Vlad Andrei Dancu	(Romania) Luca Preda (Romania) Sebastian Gima	(Romania) Radu Mihai Papoe (Argentina) Matías Zukas (Romania) Gabi Adrian Boitan (Czech Republic) David Poljak
July 3	Brașov, Romania; Clay; M25; Singles and Doubles Draws	(Czech Republic) David Poljak (Romania) Dan Alexandru Tomescu; 4–6, 6–4, [11–9]	(Sweden) Dragoș Nicolae Mădăraș (Romania) Călin Manda	(Romania) Luca Preda (Romania) Sebastian Gima	(Romania) Radu Mihai Papoe (Argentina) Matías Zukas (Romania) Gabi Adrian Boitan (Czech Republic) David Poljak
July 3	Lakewood, United States; Hard; M15; Singles and Doubles Draws	(United States) Andre Ilagan; 7–5, 3–6, 6–3	(United States) Alfredo Perez	(France) Jaimee Floyd Angele (United States) Stefan Dostanic	(United States) Keegan Smith (United States) Karl Kazuma Lee (Australia) Philip Sekulic (United States) Quinn Vandecasteele
July 3	Lakewood, United States; Hard; M15; Singles and Doubles Draws	(United States) Ryan Seggerman (United States) Patrik Trhac; 6–2, 6–4	(United States) Alfredo Perez (United States) Jamie Vance	(France) Jaimee Floyd Angele (United States) Stefan Dostanic	(United States) Keegan Smith (United States) Karl Kazuma Lee (Australia) Philip Sekulic (United States) Quinn Vandecasteele
July 3	Sofia, Bulgaria; Clay; M15; Singles and Doubles Draws	(Portugal) Gonçalo Oliveira; 6–3, 6–1	(Germany) Marvin Möller	Denis Klok (Croatia) Matej Dodig	(Slovakia) Peter Benjamín Privara (Poland) Szymon Kielan (Sweden) Jonathan Mridha (Argentina) Leonardo Aboian
July 3	Sofia, Bulgaria; Clay; M15; Singles and Doubles Draws	(Sweden) Erik Grevelius (Sweden) Adam Heinonen; 6–1, 4–6, [10–7]	(Argentina) Leonardo Aboian (Argentina) Federico Agustín Gómez	Denis Klok (Croatia) Matej Dodig	(Slovakia) Peter Benjamín Privara (Poland) Szymon Kielan (Sweden) Jonathan Mridha (Argentina) Leonardo Aboian
July 3	Nakhon Si Thammarat, Thailand; Hard; M15; Singles and Doubles Draws	(Thailand) Maximus Jones; 6–1, 6–4	(Japan) Ryuki Matsuda	(Japan) Hikaru Shiraishi (Thailand) Kasidit Samrej	(South Korea) Son Ji-hoon (Ukraine) Yurii Dzhavakian (Japan) Shuichi Sekiguchi (India) S D Prajwal Dev
July 3	Nakhon Si Thammarat, Thailand; Hard; M15; Singles and Doubles Draws	(Japan) Taisei Ichikawa (Thailand) Thantub Suksumrarn; 6–3, 3–6, [10–6]	(Thailand) Yuttana Charoenphon (Thailand) Kasidit Samrej	(Japan) Hikaru Shiraishi (Thailand) Kasidit Samrej	(South Korea) Son Ji-hoon (Ukraine) Yurii Dzhavakian (Japan) Shuichi Sekiguchi (India) S D Prajwal Dev
July 3	Tianjin, China; Hard; M15; Singles and Doubles Draws	(China) Li Zhe; 4–6, 7–6^{(8–6)}, 6–4	(China) Cui Jie	Daniil Ostapenkov (South Korea) Lee Duck-hee	(Chinese Taipei) Ray Ho (China) Wang Chukang (South Korea) Shin Woo-bin (Australia) Jeremy Jin
July 3	Tianjin, China; Hard; M15; Singles and Doubles Draws	(China) Gao Xin (Chinese Taipei) Ray Ho; 3–6, 6–4, [10–8]	(China) Li Hanwen (China) Sun Qian	Daniil Ostapenkov (South Korea) Lee Duck-hee	(Chinese Taipei) Ray Ho (China) Wang Chukang (South Korea) Shin Woo-bin (Australia) Jeremy Jin
July 3	Monastir, Tunisia; Hard; M15; Singles and Doubles Draws	(France) Alexis Gautier; 6–4, 6–3	(United States) Kalman Boyd	(Hong Kong) Coleman Wong (Greece) Alexandros Skorilas	(Poland) Filip Peliwo (Italy) Gabriele Bosio (France) Nicolas Tepmahc (Brazil) Gilbert Klier Júnior
July 3	Monastir, Tunisia; Hard; M15; Singles and Doubles Draws	(Tunisia) Wissam Abderrahman (Portugal) Tiago Pereira; 3–6, 6–1, [10–4]	Igor Kudriashov; Aleksandr Lobanov	(Hong Kong) Coleman Wong (Greece) Alexandros Skorilas	(Poland) Filip Peliwo (Italy) Gabriele Bosio (France) Nicolas Tepmahc (Brazil) Gilbert Klier Júnior
July 10	Uriage, France; Clay; M25; Singles and Doubles Draws	(France) Ugo Blanchet; 6–3, 6–4	(Germany) Marvin Möller	(France) Gabriel Debru (France) Tristan Lamasine	(Germany) Luca Wiedenmann (France) Alexandre Aubriot (France) Mathys Erhard (France) Émilien Voisin
July 10	Uriage, France; Clay; M25; Singles and Doubles Draws	(France) Maxence Beaugé (France) Émilien Voisin; 6–3, 6–4	Marat Sharipov; Alexander Zgirovsky	(France) Gabriel Debru (France) Tristan Lamasine	(Germany) Luca Wiedenmann (France) Alexandre Aubriot (France) Mathys Erhard (France) Émilien Voisin
July 10	Nottingham, United Kingdom; Grass; M25; Singles and Doubles Draws	(United Kingdom) Toby Samuel; 6–4, 6–4	(United Kingdom) Billy Harris	(United Kingdom) Charles Broom (United Kingdom) Daniel Cox	(United Kingdom) Jack Pinnington Jones (United Kingdom) Connor Thomson (Germany) Mats Rosenkranz (United Kingdom) Patrick Brady
July 10	Nottingham, United Kingdom; Grass; M25; Singles and Doubles Draws	(United Kingdom) Charles Broom (United Kingdom) Ben Jones; Walkover	(United Kingdom) Matthew Howse (United Kingdom) Joel Pierleoni	(United Kingdom) Charles Broom (United Kingdom) Daniel Cox	(United Kingdom) Jack Pinnington Jones (United Kingdom) Connor Thomson (Germany) Mats Rosenkranz (United Kingdom) Patrick Brady
July 10	Roda de Bara, Spain; Clay; M25; Singles and Doubles Draws	(Spain) Imanol López Morillo; 6–4, 6–4	(Turkey) Cem İlkel	(Spain) Alex Martínez (Czech Republic) Dominik Palán	(United States) Victor Lilov (China) Sun Fajing (United Kingdom) Felix Gill (Lithuania) Edas Butvilas
July 10	Roda de Bara, Spain; Clay; M25; Singles and Doubles Draws	(Spain) Alberto Barroso Campos (Spain) Pedro Vives Marcos; 5–7, 6–3, [10–4]	(Spain) John Echeverría (China) Sun Fajing	(Spain) Alex Martínez (Czech Republic) Dominik Palán	(United States) Victor Lilov (China) Sun Fajing (United Kingdom) Felix Gill (Lithuania) Edas Butvilas
July 10	Padova, Italy; Clay; M25; Singles and Doubles Draws	(France) Clément Tabur; 1–6, 7–6^{(7–5)}, 6–3	(Italy) Samuel Vincent Ruggeri	(Italy) Gabriele Pennaforti; Kirill Kivattsev	(United States) Oliver Crawford (Italy) Giorgio Tabacco (Uzbekistan) Sergey Fomin (Italy) Fausto Tabacco
July 10	Padova, Italy; Clay; M25; Singles and Doubles Draws	(Argentina) Lautaro Midón (Brazil) Fernando Yamacita; 6–3, 6–7^{(4–7)}, [10–6]	(Chile) Nicolás Bruna (Uruguay) Franco Roncadelli	(Italy) Gabriele Pennaforti; Kirill Kivattsev	(United States) Oliver Crawford (Italy) Giorgio Tabacco (Uzbekistan) Sergey Fomin (Italy) Fausto Tabacco
July 10	Kassel, Germany; Clay; M25+H; Singles and Doubles Draws	(Czech Republic) Andrew Paulson; 6–4, 6–2	(Brazil) Daniel Dutra da Silva	(Belgium) Buvaysar Gadamauri (Bolivia) Murkel Dellien	(Bosnia and Herzegovina) Aldin Šetkić; Svyatoslav Gulin (Germany) Philip Florig (Lebanon) Hady Habib
July 10	Kassel, Germany; Clay; M25+H; Singles and Doubles Draws	(Czech Republic) Jiří Barnat (Czech Republic) Patrik Rikl; 6–4, 6–4	(Bolivia) Murkel Dellien (Serbia) Stefan Latinović	(Belgium) Buvaysar Gadamauri (Bolivia) Murkel Dellien	(Bosnia and Herzegovina) Aldin Šetkić; Svyatoslav Gulin (Germany) Philip Florig (Lebanon) Hady Habib
July 10	Esch/Alzette, Luxembourg; Clay; M25; Singles and Doubles Draws	(Spain) Nikolás Sánchez Izquierdo; 1–6, 6–3, 6–2	(Germany) Marlon Vankan	(Belgium) Alexander Blockx (Luxembourg) Chris Rodesch	(Poland) Marcel Zieliński (Germany) Kai Wehnelt (Argentina) Federico Agustín Gómez (Morocco) Adam Moundir
July 10	Esch/Alzette, Luxembourg; Clay; M25; Singles and Doubles Draws	(Luxembourg) Alex Knaff (Luxembourg) Chris Rodesch; 6–3, 6–4	(Greece) Dimitris Sakellaridis (Greece) Stefanos Sakellaridis	(Belgium) Alexander Blockx (Luxembourg) Chris Rodesch	(Poland) Marcel Zieliński (Germany) Kai Wehnelt (Argentina) Federico Agustín Gómez (Morocco) Adam Moundir
July 10	Laval, Canada; Hard; M25; Singles and Doubles Draws	(Jamaica) Blaise Bicknell; 3–6, 6–3, 6–4	(United States) James Tracy	(Japan) Leo Vithoontien (Canada) Liam Draxl	(United States) Alafia Ayeni (United States) Tristan McCormick (Australia) Philip Sekulic (Moldova) Alexander Cozbinov
July 10	Laval, Canada; Hard; M25; Singles and Doubles Draws	(Canada) Joshua Lapadat (United States) J. Mercer; 4–1, ret.	(Canada) Liam Draxl (Canada) Jonathan Sorbo	(Japan) Leo Vithoontien (Canada) Liam Draxl	(United States) Alafia Ayeni (United States) Tristan McCormick (Australia) Philip Sekulic (Moldova) Alexander Cozbinov
July 10	Dallas, United States; Hard (i); M25; Singles and Doubles Draws	(United States) Mitchell Krueger; 6–4, 6–0	(United States) Aidan Mayo	(Australia) Edward Winter (Australia) Blake Ellis	(United States) Noah Schachter (United States) Karl Poling (United States) Patrick Maloney (United States) Micah Braswell
July 10	Dallas, United States; Hard (i); M25; Singles and Doubles Draws	(United States) George Goldhoff (United States) Tyler Zink; 4–6, 6–3, [10–8]	(Australia) Thomas Hulme (Argentina) Franco Ribero	(Australia) Edward Winter (Australia) Blake Ellis	(United States) Noah Schachter (United States) Karl Poling (United States) Patrick Maloney (United States) Micah Braswell
July 10	Lakewood, United States; Hard; M15; Singles and Doubles Draws	(United States) Stefan Dostanic; 6–7^{(1–7)}, 6–2, 7–5	(United States) Andre Ilagan	(Australia) Derek Pham (United States) Learner Tien	(United States) Alexander Kotzen (United States) Keshav Chopra (United States) Karl Kazuma Lee (United States) Keegan Smith
July 10	Lakewood, United States; Hard; M15; Singles and Doubles Draws	(United States) Ryan Seggerman (United States) Patrik Trhac; 7–5, 6–2	(United States) Jack Anthrop (United States) Bryce Nakashima	(Australia) Derek Pham (United States) Learner Tien	(United States) Alexander Kotzen (United States) Keshav Chopra (United States) Karl Kazuma Lee (United States) Keegan Smith
July 10	Nakhon Si Thammarat, Thailand; Hard; M15; Singles and Doubles Draws	(South Korea) Lee Jea-moon; 6–4, 6–1	(Japan) Taisei Ichikawa	(India) Sidharth Rawat (Thailand) Kasidit Samrej	(Japan) Shinji Hazawa (Thailand) Pawit Sornlaksup (Japan) Takuya Kumasaka (Japan) Ryuki Matsuda
July 10	Nakhon Si Thammarat, Thailand; Hard; M15; Singles and Doubles Draws	(Australia) Blake Bayldon (Thailand) Pruchya Isaro; 3–6, 7–6^{(10–8)}, [10–7]	(Thailand) Maximus Jones (Japan) Takuya Kumasaka	(India) Sidharth Rawat (Thailand) Kasidit Samrej	(Japan) Shinji Hazawa (Thailand) Pawit Sornlaksup (Japan) Takuya Kumasaka (Japan) Ryuki Matsuda
July 10	Shanghai, China; Hard; M15; Singles and Doubles Draws	(Switzerland) Luca Castelnuovo; 7–5, 7–5	(China) Wang Chukang	(China) Tang Sheng (China) Mo Yecong	(Thailand) Pol Wattanakul (United States) Samir Banerjee (Australia) Jeremy Jin (Thailand) Wishaya Trongcharoenchaikul
July 10	Shanghai, China; Hard; M15; Singles and Doubles Draws	(Switzerland) Luca Castelnuovo (China) Wang Aoran; 6–1, 7–5	Erik Arutiunian; Daniil Ostapenkov	(China) Tang Sheng (China) Mo Yecong	(Thailand) Pol Wattanakul (United States) Samir Banerjee (Australia) Jeremy Jin (Thailand) Wishaya Trongcharoenchaikul
July 10	Monastir, Tunisia; Hard; M15; Singles and Doubles Draws	(France) Alexis Gautier; 6–3, 7–5	(Morocco) Yassine Dlimi	(Serbia) Boris Butulija (France) Enzo Wallart	(Morocco) Yassine Smiej (Algeria) Samir Hamza Reguig (India) Niki Kaliyanda Poonacha (Cyprus) Menelaos Efstathiou
July 10	Monastir, Tunisia; Hard; M15; Singles and Doubles Draws	(Italy) Gabriele Bosio (Tunisia) Adam Nagoudi; 6–2, 7–5	(South Africa) Lleyton Cronje (Australia) Anthony Popyrin	(Serbia) Boris Butulija (France) Enzo Wallart	(Morocco) Yassine Smiej (Algeria) Samir Hamza Reguig (India) Niki Kaliyanda Poonacha (Cyprus) Menelaos Efstathiou
July 17	Brazzaville, Congo Republic; Clay; M25; Singles and Doubles Draws	(Egypt) Karim-Mohamed Maamoun; 7–5, 6–2	(United States) Alexander Stater	(France) Calvin Hemery (France) Thomas Setodji	(Senegal) Seydina André (India) Rishab Agarwal (Tunisia) Aziz Ouakaa (Argentina) Matías Franco Descotte
July 17	Brazzaville, Congo Republic; Clay; M25; Singles and Doubles Draws	(United States) Tauheed Browning (Venezuela) Brandon Pérez; 7–5, 6–7^{(7–9)}, [10–6]	(Burundi) Guy Orly Iradukunda (Tunisia) Aziz Ouakaa	(France) Calvin Hemery (France) Thomas Setodji	(Senegal) Seydina André (India) Rishab Agarwal (Tunisia) Aziz Ouakaa (Argentina) Matías Franco Descotte
July 17	Telfs, Austria; Clay; M25; Singles and Doubles Draws	(Austria) Sandro Kopp; 6–2, 6–1	(Belgium) Buvaysar Gadamauri	(South Korea) Gerard Campaña Lee (Germany) Peter Heller	(Czech Republic) Lukáš Rosol (Switzerland) Nicolás Parizzia (Czech Republic) Daniel Siniakov (Argentina) Alex Barrena
July 17	Telfs, Austria; Clay; M25; Singles and Doubles Draws	(Germany) Jakob Schnaitter (Germany) Mark Wallner; 6–4, 6–7^{(7–9)}, [10–5]	(Slovakia) Miloš Karol (Austria) Sandro Kopp	(South Korea) Gerard Campaña Lee (Germany) Peter Heller	(Czech Republic) Lukáš Rosol (Switzerland) Nicolás Parizzia (Czech Republic) Daniel Siniakov (Argentina) Alex Barrena
July 17	Gandia, Spain; Clay; M25; Singles and Doubles Draws	(Spain) Sergi Pérez Contri; 6–3, 7–5	(United States) Oliver Crawford	(Spain) Pedro Ródenas (Bolivia) Murkel Dellien	(Spain) Diego Augusto Barreto Sánchez (Italy) Facundo Juárez (Spain) Carlos López Montagud (Argentina) Valerio Aboian
July 17	Gandia, Spain; Clay; M25; Singles and Doubles Draws	(United States) Garrett Johns (Spain) Pedro Ródenas; 6–4, 7–6^{(7–3)}	(United States) Nicholas Bybel (Spain) Antonio Prat	(Spain) Pedro Ródenas (Bolivia) Murkel Dellien	(Spain) Diego Augusto Barreto Sánchez (Italy) Facundo Juárez (Spain) Carlos López Montagud (Argentina) Valerio Aboian
July 17	Esch/Alzette, Luxembourg; Clay; M25; Singles and Doubles Draws	(Luxembourg) Alex Knaff; 6–3, 6–1	(Germany) Marlon Vankan	Mikalai Haliak (Luxembourg) Chris Rodesch	(Greece) Stefanos Sakellaridis (Italy) Tommaso Compagnucci (Austria) David Pichler (France) Robin Catry
July 17	Esch/Alzette, Luxembourg; Clay; M25; Singles and Doubles Draws	(Luxembourg) Alex Knaff (Austria) David Pichler; 1–6, 6–1, [12–10]	(Greece) Dimitris Sakellaridis (Greece) Stefanos Sakellaridis	Mikalai Haliak (Luxembourg) Chris Rodesch	(Greece) Stefanos Sakellaridis (Italy) Tommaso Compagnucci (Austria) David Pichler (France) Robin Catry
July 17	Roehampton, United Kingdom; Grass; M25; Singles and Doubles Draws	(Australia) Luke Saville; 6–4, 1–6, 6–1	(United Kingdom) Daniel Cox	(United Kingdom) Charles Broom (United Kingdom) Johannus Monday	(United Kingdom) Billy Harris (United Kingdom) Millen Hurrion (United Kingdom) Ryan James Storrie (United Kingdom) Mark Whitehouse
July 17	Roehampton, United Kingdom; Grass; M25; Singles and Doubles Draws	(United Kingdom) Emile Hudd (United Kingdom) Johannus Monday; 6–4, 7–5	(France) Arthur Bouquier (France) François Musitelli	(United Kingdom) Charles Broom (United Kingdom) Johannus Monday	(United Kingdom) Billy Harris (United Kingdom) Millen Hurrion (United Kingdom) Ryan James Storrie (United Kingdom) Mark Whitehouse
July 17	Champaign, United States; Hard; M25; Singles and Doubles Draws	(United Kingdom) Aidan McHugh; 6–4, 6–3	(United States) Cannon Kingsley	Evgeny Donskoy (Japan) Naoki Nakagawa	(United States) Noah Schachter (Japan) Yuki Mochizuki (Japan) Kenta Miyoshi (United States) Alexander Bernard
July 17	Champaign, United States; Hard; M25; Singles and Doubles Draws	(United States) Trey Hilderbrand (United States) Noah Schachter; 6–4, 7–5	(United States) Jack Anthrop (United States) Cannon Kingsley	Evgeny Donskoy (Japan) Naoki Nakagawa	(United States) Noah Schachter (Japan) Yuki Mochizuki (Japan) Kenta Miyoshi (United States) Alexander Bernard
July 17	Castelo Branco, Portugal; Hard; M25; Singles and Doubles Draws	(Portugal) Gonçalo Oliveira; 6–2, 6–1	(Italy) Fabrizio Andaloro	(France) Guillaume Dalmasso (Portugal) Jaime Faria	(Argentina) Julio César Porras (United States) Victor Lilov (United States) Jake van Emburgh (Chile) Diego Fernández Flores
July 17	Castelo Branco, Portugal; Hard; M25; Singles and Doubles Draws	(Australia) Aaron Addison (Australia) Ethan Cook; 6–3, 7–6^{(8–6)}	(Portugal) Manuel Gonçalves (Portugal) Hugo Maia	(France) Guillaume Dalmasso (Portugal) Jaime Faria	(Argentina) Julio César Porras (United States) Victor Lilov (United States) Jake van Emburgh (Chile) Diego Fernández Flores
July 17	Fuzhou, China; Hard; M25; Singles and Doubles Draws	(China) Li Hanwen; 6–2, 6–3	(China) Wang Xiaofei	(China) Mu Tao (China) Mo Yecong	(China) Tang Sheng (China) Li Zhe (Germany) Jimmy Yang (Hong Kong) Coleman Wong
July 17	Fuzhou, China; Hard; M25; Singles and Doubles Draws	(China) Cui Jie (China) Wang Xiaofei; 6–4, 6–4	(China) Dong Bohua (China) Gao Xin	(China) Mu Tao (China) Mo Yecong	(China) Tang Sheng (China) Li Zhe (Germany) Jimmy Yang (Hong Kong) Coleman Wong
July 17	Rochester, United States; Clay; M15; Singles and Doubles Draws	(Barbados) Darian King; 6-0, 7-6^{(7-2)}	(Argentina) Ignacio Monzón	(United States) AJ Catanzariti (United States) Tyler Stice	(The Bahamas) Justin Roberts (United States) Nicholas Heng (Japan) Kosuke Ogura (United States) Henrik Wiersholm
July 17	Rochester, United States; Clay; M15; Singles and Doubles Draws	(Canada) Juan Carlos Aguilar (Argentina) Ignacio Monzón; 7–6^{(7–3)}, 7–6^{(7–4)}	(Chile) Miguel Ángel Cabrera (United States) Tyler Stice	(United States) AJ Catanzariti (United States) Tyler Stice	(The Bahamas) Justin Roberts (United States) Nicholas Heng (Japan) Kosuke Ogura (United States) Henrik Wiersholm
July 17	Gubbio, Italy; Clay; M15; Singles and Doubles Draws	(France) Gabriel Debru; 6-4, 3-6, 6-3	(Italy) Federico Arnaboldi	(Italy) Fausto Tabacco (Italy) Marco Miceli	(Italy) Alessandro Pecci (Italy) Daniel Bagnolini (Italy) Luigi Sorrentino (Italy) Lorenzo Sciahbasi
July 17	Gubbio, Italy; Clay; M15; Singles and Doubles Draws	(Italy) Jacopo Bilardo (Italy) Giorgio Ricca; 7–6^{(8–6)}, 6–1	(Italy) Gabriele Maria Noce (Italy) Luigi Sorrentino	(Italy) Fausto Tabacco (Italy) Marco Miceli	(Italy) Alessandro Pecci (Italy) Daniel Bagnolini (Italy) Luigi Sorrentino (Italy) Lorenzo Sciahbasi
July 17	Nakhon Si Thammarat, Thailand; Hard; M15; Singles and Doubles Draws	(France) Arthur Weber; 6–2, 6–1	(Thailand) Maximus Jones	(Thailand) Palaphoom Kovapitukted (Japan) Yuta Kawahashi	(Australia) Chase Ferguson (South Korea) Shin San-hui (Ukraine) Yurii Dzhavakian (South Korea) Lee Jea-moon
July 17	Nakhon Si Thammarat, Thailand; Hard; M15; Singles and Doubles Draws	(South Korea) Han Seon-yong (Thailand) Thantub Suksumrarn; 6–4, 6–4	(South Korea) Jeong Yeong-seok (South Korea) Lee Jea-moon	(Thailand) Palaphoom Kovapitukted (Japan) Yuta Kawahashi	(Australia) Chase Ferguson (South Korea) Shin San-hui (Ukraine) Yurii Dzhavakian (South Korea) Lee Jea-moon
July 17	Uslar, Germany; Clay; M15; Singles and Doubles Draws	(Germany) Sebastian Prechtel; 6–3, 4–6, 6–3	(Serbia) Stefan Popović	(Germany) Christoph Negritu (Brazil) Nicolas Zanellato	(Germany) Jeremy Schifris (Germany) John Sperle (Belgium) Gilles-Arnaud Bailly (France) Corentin Denolly
July 17	Uslar, Germany; Clay; M15; Singles and Doubles Draws	(Ukraine) Illya Beloborodko (Czech Republic) Jakub Nicod; 6–3, 2–6, [10–3]	(Germany) Christoph Negritu (Germany) Adrian Oetzbach	(Germany) Christoph Negritu (Brazil) Nicolas Zanellato	(Germany) Jeremy Schifris (Germany) John Sperle (Belgium) Gilles-Arnaud Bailly (France) Corentin Denolly
July 17	Monastir, Tunisia; Hard; M15; Singles and Doubles Draws	(Brazil) Gilbert Klier Júnior; 6–2, 7–5	(Morocco) Yassine Dlimi	(Serbia) Boris Butulija (France) Enzo Wallart	(Turkey) Arda Azkara (Algeria) Samir Hamza Reguig; Egor Agafonov (South Africa) Kris van Wyk
July 17	Monastir, Tunisia; Hard; M15; Singles and Doubles Draws	(Morocco) Mehdi Benchakroun (Morocco) Yassine Dlimi; 5–7, 7–6^{(10–8)}, [10–5]	(France) Loann Massard (France) Cyril Vandermeersch	(Serbia) Boris Butulija (France) Enzo Wallart	(Turkey) Arda Azkara (Algeria) Samir Hamza Reguig; Egor Agafonov (South Africa) Kris van Wyk
July 24	Dénia, Spain; Clay; M25; Singles and Doubles Draws	(Spain) Pedro Ródenas; 7–6^{(7–3)}, 6–3	(Spain) Carlos López Montagud	(Lithuania) Vilius Gaubas (Ukraine) Eric Vanshelboim	(Spain) Sergi Pérez Contri; Andrey Chepelev (Italy) Facundo Juárez (Spain) Iker Urribarrens Ramírez
July 24	Dénia, Spain; Clay; M25; Singles and Doubles Draws	(United States) Dali Blanch (France) Arthur Géa; 4–6, 6–3, [10–7]	(Spain) Luis Francisco (Spain) Joan Torres Espinosa	(Lithuania) Vilius Gaubas (Ukraine) Eric Vanshelboim	(Spain) Sergi Pérez Contri; Andrey Chepelev (Italy) Facundo Juárez (Spain) Iker Urribarrens Ramírez
July 24	Brazzaville, Congo Republic; Clay; M25; Singles and Doubles Draws	(France) Calvin Hemery; 4–6, 6–2, 6–3	(France) Thomas Setodji	(Brazil) Mateo Barreiros Reyes (Tunisia) Aziz Ouakaa	(India) Rishab Agarwal (India) Ishaque Eqbal (Burundi) Guy Orly Iradukunda (Argentina) Matías Franco Descotte
July 24	Brazzaville, Congo Republic; Clay; M25; Singles and Doubles Draws	(Burundi) Guy Orly Iradukunda (Tunisia) Aziz Ouakaa; 7–5, 3–6, [10–8]	(India) Rishab Agarwal (India) Ishaque Eqbal	(Brazil) Mateo Barreiros Reyes (Tunisia) Aziz Ouakaa	(India) Rishab Agarwal (India) Ishaque Eqbal (Burundi) Guy Orly Iradukunda (Argentina) Matías Franco Descotte
July 24	Bacău, Romania; Clay; M25+H; Singles and Doubles Draws	(Romania) Marius Copil; 6–3, 7–6^{(7–4)}	(Argentina) Hernán Casanova	(Romania) Cezar Crețu (Romania) Filip Cristian Jianu	(Ukraine) Oleg Prihodko (Romania) Radu Mihai Papoe (Romania) Ioan Alexandru Chirița (Italy) Luca Giacomini
July 24	Bacău, Romania; Clay; M25+H; Singles and Doubles Draws	(Argentina) Hernán Casanova (Argentina) Juan Pablo Paz; 7–6^{(7–4)}, 6–7^{(4–7)}, [10–8]	(Romania) Marius Copil (Romania) Bogdan Pavel	(Romania) Cezar Crețu (Romania) Filip Cristian Jianu	(Ukraine) Oleg Prihodko (Romania) Radu Mihai Papoe (Romania) Ioan Alexandru Chirița (Italy) Luca Giacomini
July 24	Edwardsville, United States; Hard; M25; Singles and Doubles Draws	(United States) Quinn Vandecasteele; 6–3, 7–6^{(7–5)}	(United Kingdom) Aidan McHugh	(Japan) Shunsuke Mitsui (United States) Ozan Baris	(United States) Learner Tien (Croatia) Vito Tonejc (United States) Kareem Al Allaf (Japan) Naoki Nakagawa
July 24	Edwardsville, United States; Hard; M25; Singles and Doubles Draws	(United States) George Goldhoff (United States) Mac Kiger; 6–2, 6–1	(United States) Kareem Al Allaf (United States) Colin Markes	(Japan) Shunsuke Mitsui (United States) Ozan Baris	(United States) Learner Tien (Croatia) Vito Tonejc (United States) Kareem Al Allaf (Japan) Naoki Nakagawa
July 24	Kramsach, Austria; Clay; M25; Singles and Doubles Draws	(North Macedonia) Kalin Ivanovski; 6–2, 6–2	(South Korea) Gerard Campaña Lee	(United States) Oliver Crawford (France) Mathys Erhard	(Germany) Peter Heller (Czech Republic) Lukáš Rosol (Germany) Lambert Ruland (Austria) Sandro Kopp
July 24	Kramsach, Austria; Clay; M25; Singles and Doubles Draws	(Germany) Peter Heller (Germany) Kai Wehnelt; 6–4, 6–4	(United States) Toby Kodat (United Kingdom) Anton Matusevich	(United States) Oliver Crawford (France) Mathys Erhard	(Germany) Peter Heller (Czech Republic) Lukáš Rosol (Germany) Lambert Ruland (Austria) Sandro Kopp
July 24	Porto, Portugal; Hard; M25; Singles and Doubles Draws	(France) Jules Marie; 6–2, 4–6, 7–6^{(7–3)}	(France) Kenny de Schepper	(France) Raphael Lambling (France) Alexandre Reco	(Portugal) João Domingues (United States) Jake van Emburgh (France) Adan Freire da Silva (Spain) Mario González Fernández
July 24	Porto, Portugal; Hard; M25; Singles and Doubles Draws	(United Kingdom) Arthur Fery (United Kingdom) Stuart Parker; 6–1, 6–3	(Chile) Diego Fernández Flores (Portugal) Duarte Vale	(France) Raphael Lambling (France) Alexandre Reco	(Portugal) João Domingues (United States) Jake van Emburgh (France) Adan Freire da Silva (Spain) Mario González Fernández
July 24	Caloundra, Australia; Hard; M15; Singles and Doubles Draws	(Australia) Luke Saville; 6–4, 6–3	(Japan) Ryuki Matsuda	(New Zealand) Isaac Becroft (Australia) Thomas Fancutt	(New Zealand) Jack Loutit (Australia) Jake Delaney (Japan) Daisuke Sumizawa (Australia) Edward Winter
July 24	Caloundra, Australia; Hard; M15; Singles and Doubles Draws	(New Zealand) Isaac Becroft (New Zealand) James Watt; 6–2, 6–3	(Australia) Casey Hoole (Australia) Tai Sach	(New Zealand) Isaac Becroft (Australia) Thomas Fancutt	(New Zealand) Jack Loutit (Australia) Jake Delaney (Japan) Daisuke Sumizawa (Australia) Edward Winter
July 24	Pittsburgh, United States; Clay; M15; Singles and Doubles Draws	(Barbados) Darian King; 4–6, 6–3, 6–3	(Canada) Juan Carlos Aguilar	(United States) Samir Banerjee (United States) Felix Corwin	(United States) Kyle Seelig (Argentina) Ignacio Monzón (United States) Bruno Kuzuhara (Costa Rica) Jesse Flores
July 24	Pittsburgh, United States; Clay; M15; Singles and Doubles Draws	(Barbados) Darian King (Antigua and Barbuda) Jody Maginley; 6–4, 6–4	(United States) Patrick Maloney (United States) Tyler Zink	(United States) Samir Banerjee (United States) Felix Corwin	(United States) Kyle Seelig (Argentina) Ignacio Monzón (United States) Bruno Kuzuhara (Costa Rica) Jesse Flores
July 24	Metzingen, Germany; Clay; M15; Singles and Doubles Draws	(Germany) Nicola Kuhn; 6–4, 6–1	(Czech Republic) Daniel Pátý	(Netherlands) Sander Jong (Germany) Liam Gavrielides	(Germany) Kai Lemstra (Serbia) Stefan Popović (Germany) Philip Florig (Switzerland) Gian Luca Tanner
July 24	Metzingen, Germany; Clay; M15; Singles and Doubles Draws	(Netherlands) Sander Jong (Netherlands) Jesse Timmermans; 7–5, 4–6, [10–8]	(Germany) Philip Florig (Germany) Yannik Kelm	(Netherlands) Sander Jong (Germany) Liam Gavrielides	(Germany) Kai Lemstra (Serbia) Stefan Popović (Germany) Philip Florig (Switzerland) Gian Luca Tanner
July 24	Vejle, Denmark; Clay; M15; Singles and Doubles Draws	(Netherlands) Alec Deckers; 6–4, 3–6, 6–3	(Denmark) Elmer Møller	(Denmark) August Holmgren (Denmark) Christian Sigsgaard	(Italy) Luigi Sorrentino (Denmark) Johannes Ingildsen (France) Maxence Rivet (Germany) Lewie Lane
July 24	Vejle, Denmark; Clay; M15; Singles and Doubles Draws	(Sweden) Simon Freund (Denmark) Johannes Ingildsen; 6–2, 6–3	(Denmark) Carl Emil Overbeck (Denmark) Oskar Brostrøm Poulsen	(Denmark) August Holmgren (Denmark) Christian Sigsgaard	(Italy) Luigi Sorrentino (Denmark) Johannes Ingildsen (France) Maxence Rivet (Germany) Lewie Lane
July 24	Perugia, Italy; Clay; M15; Singles and Doubles Draws	(Italy) Fausto Tabacco; 7–6^{(7–3)}, 6–3	(Italy) Andrea Picchione	(Italy) Luca Castagnola (Italy) Manuel Mazza	(Brazil) Fernando Yamacita (Italy) Riccardo Balzerani (Italy) Luca Tomasetto (Italy) Gabriele Piraino
July 24	Perugia, Italy; Clay; M15; Singles and Doubles Draws	(Italy) Andrea Picchione (Italy) Giorgio Ricca; 6–2, 5–7, [10–3]	(Italy) Federico Bertuccioli (Italy) Luca Tomasetto	(Italy) Luca Castagnola (Italy) Manuel Mazza	(Brazil) Fernando Yamacita (Italy) Riccardo Balzerani (Italy) Luca Tomasetto (Italy) Gabriele Piraino
July 24	Novi Sad, Serbia; Clay; M15; Singles and Doubles Draws	(Slovenia) Bor Artnak; 6–0, 7–6^{(7–2)}	(Bosnia and Herzegovina) Andrej Nedić	(France) Florent Bax; Marat Sharipov	(Argentina) Valerio Aboian (Argentina) Bautista Vilicich (Croatia) Mili Poljičak (Serbia) Viktor Jović
July 24	Novi Sad, Serbia; Clay; M15; Singles and Doubles Draws	(Argentina) Leonardo Aboian (Argentina) Valerio Aboian; 7–6^{(7–5)}, 6–4	(France) Florent Bax (France) Louis Tessa	(France) Florent Bax; Marat Sharipov	(Argentina) Valerio Aboian (Argentina) Bautista Vilicich (Croatia) Mili Poljičak (Serbia) Viktor Jović
July 24	Monastir, Tunisia; Hard; M15; Singles and Doubles Draws	(South Africa) Kris van Wyk; 6–1, 6–2	(United States) Adit Sinha	(Morocco) Yassine Dlimi (France) Cyril Vandermeersch	(Czech Republic) Matthew William Donald (Italy) Filippo Moroni (Algeria) Samir Hamza Reguig (France) François Musitelli
July 24	Monastir, Tunisia; Hard; M15; Singles and Doubles Draws	(Italy) Andrea Bacaloni (Italy) Lorenzo Lorusso; 6–3, 6–4	(Morocco) Mehdi Benchakroun (Morocco) Yassine Dlimi	(Morocco) Yassine Dlimi (France) Cyril Vandermeersch	(Czech Republic) Matthew William Donald (Italy) Filippo Moroni (Algeria) Samir Hamza Reguig (France) François Musitelli
July 31	Bolzano, Italy; Clay; M25; Singles and Doubles Draws	(Italy) Giovanni Oradini; 4–6, 6–3, 7–6^{(7–1)}	(France) Mathys Erhard	(Argentina) Gian Matías Di Natale (Argentina) Alex Barrena	Nikolay Vylegzhanin (Italy) Giorgio Ricca (Germany) Jeremy Jahn (Italy) Filippo Speziali
July 31	Bolzano, Italy; Clay; M25; Singles and Doubles Draws	(Germany) Jeremy Jahn (Germany) Mark Wallner; 7–6^{(13–11)}, 6–0	(Argentina) Alex Barrena (Argentina) Juan Bautista Otegui	(Argentina) Gian Matías Di Natale (Argentina) Alex Barrena	Nikolay Vylegzhanin (Italy) Giorgio Ricca (Germany) Jeremy Jahn (Italy) Filippo Speziali
July 31	Roehampton, United Kingdom; Hard; M25; Singles and Doubles Draws	(United Kingdom) George Loffhagen; 6–2, 6–2	(United Kingdom) Luke Simkiss	(France) Dan Added (United Kingdom) George Houghton	(United Kingdom) Paul Jubb (United Kingdom) Joshua Goodger (United Kingdom) Toby Samuel (United Kingdom) Luc Koenig
July 31	Roehampton, United Kingdom; Hard; M25; Singles and Doubles Draws	(United Kingdom) Charles Broom (United Kingdom) George Houghton; 6–4, 4–6, [11–9]	(United Kingdom) Emile Hudd (United Kingdom) Johannus Monday	(France) Dan Added (United Kingdom) George Houghton	(United Kingdom) Paul Jubb (United Kingdom) Joshua Goodger (United Kingdom) Toby Samuel (United Kingdom) Luc Koenig
July 31	Wetzlar, Germany; Clay; M25; Singles and Doubles Draws	(France) Tristan Lamasine; 6–3, 6–1	(Germany) Sebastian Fanselow	(Brazil) Orlando Luz (Belgium) Buvaysar Gadamauri	(Germany) Maik Steiner (Germany) Milan Welte (Germany) Tim Handel (Germany) Nicola Kuhn
July 31	Wetzlar, Germany; Clay; M25; Singles and Doubles Draws	(Germany) Tim Büttner (Germany) Niklas Schell; 7–5, 6–4	(Germany) Lars Johann (Germany) Milan Welte	(Brazil) Orlando Luz (Belgium) Buvaysar Gadamauri	(Germany) Maik Steiner (Germany) Milan Welte (Germany) Tim Handel (Germany) Nicola Kuhn
July 31	Pitești, Romania; Clay; M25; Singles and Doubles Draws	(Romania) Cezar Crețu; 6–7^{(6–8)}, 6–2, 6–3	(France) Corentin Denolly	(Italy) Luca Giacomini (Romania) Radu Mihai Papoe	(Romania) Vlad Andrei Dancu (Slovenia) Bor Artnak (Romania) Ștefan Paloși (Romania) Sebastian Gima
July 31	Pitești, Romania; Clay; M25; Singles and Doubles Draws	(Romania) Radu Mihai Papoe (Romania) Dan Alexandru Tomescu; 7–6^{(7–4)}, 6–3	(France) Corentin Denolly (Romania) Ștefan Paloși	(Italy) Luca Giacomini (Romania) Radu Mihai Papoe	(Romania) Vlad Andrei Dancu (Slovenia) Bor Artnak (Romania) Ștefan Paloși (Romania) Sebastian Gima
July 31	Decatur, United States; Hard; M25; Singles and Doubles Draws	(United States) Cash Hanzlik; 4–6, 6–1, 6–4	(Japan) Naoki Nakagawa	(United States) Jonah Braswell (United States) Hunter Heck	(United States) Kareem Al Allaf (Brazil) Rafael Tosetto (United States) Ozan Baris (United States) Ezekiel Clark
July 31	Decatur, United States; Hard; M25; Singles and Doubles Draws	(Australia) Patrick Harper (Japan) Shunsuke Mitsui; 7–6^{(7–2)}, 6–4	(United States) Jacob Brumm (United States) Ezekiel Clark	(United States) Jonah Braswell (United States) Hunter Heck	(United States) Kareem Al Allaf (Brazil) Rafael Tosetto (United States) Ozan Baris (United States) Ezekiel Clark
July 31	Astana, Kazakhstan; Hard; M25; Singles and Doubles Draws	(Japan) Renta Tokuda; 6–0, 6–4	(Japan) Yusuke Takahashi	(Japan) Shuichi Sekiguchi (Uzbekistan) Khumoyun Sultanov	(Poland) Filip Peliwo; Egor Agafonov (France) Robin Bertrand; Egor Gerasimov
July 31	Astana, Kazakhstan; Hard; M25; Singles and Doubles Draws	(India) Siddhant Banthia (India) Sai Karteek Reddy Ganta; 7–5, 6–7^{(13–15)}, [10–4]	(Estonia) Daniil Glinka (Estonia) Karl Kiur Saar	(Japan) Shuichi Sekiguchi (Uzbekistan) Khumoyun Sultanov	(Poland) Filip Peliwo; Egor Agafonov (France) Robin Bertrand; Egor Gerasimov
July 31	Anning, China; Clay; M25; Singles and Doubles Draws	(China) Sun Fajing; 6–3, 4–6, 6–2	(China) Cui Jie	(United States) Evan Zhu (China) Te Rigele	(China) Bai Yan (China) Wang Xiaofei; Aleksander Chayka; Mikalai Haliak
July 31	Anning, China; Clay; M25; Singles and Doubles Draws	(China) Cui Jie (China) Wang Xiaofei; 3–6, 6–2, [10–8]	(China) Sun Fajing (United States) Evan Zhu	(United States) Evan Zhu (China) Te Rigele	(China) Bai Yan (China) Wang Xiaofei; Aleksander Chayka; Mikalai Haliak
July 31	Novi Sad, Serbia; Clay; M15; Singles and Doubles Draws	(Croatia) Matej Dodig; 4–6, 6–2, 6–3	(Serbia) Stefan Popović	(Argentina) Valerio Aboian (Serbia) Dušan Obradović	(France) Luka Pavlovic (France) Florent Bax (Bosnia and Herzegovina) Andrej Nedić (Croatia) Duje Kekez
July 31	Novi Sad, Serbia; Clay; M15; Singles and Doubles Draws	(Argentina) Leonardo Aboian (Argentina) Valerio Aboian; 6–3, 6–2	Erik Arutiunian; Daniil Ostapenkov	(Argentina) Valerio Aboian (Serbia) Dušan Obradović	(France) Luka Pavlovic (France) Florent Bax (Bosnia and Herzegovina) Andrej Nedić (Croatia) Duje Kekez
July 31	Hyvinkää, Finland; Clay; M15; Singles and Doubles Draws	(Finland) Iiro Vasa; 4–6, 6–4, 7–5	(France) Maxence Rivet	(France) Amaury Raynel (Italy) Leonardo Rossi	(Sweden) Karl Friberg (Germany) Dominik Böhler (Germany) Lewie Lane (Italy) Luigi Sorrentino
July 31	Hyvinkää, Finland; Clay; M15; Singles and Doubles Draws	(Finland) Patrick Kaukovalta (Finland) Eero Vasa; 6–1, 5–7, [10–5]	(Sweden) Erik Grevelius (Sweden) Adam Heinonen	(France) Amaury Raynel (Italy) Leonardo Rossi	(Sweden) Karl Friberg (Germany) Dominik Böhler (Germany) Lewie Lane (Italy) Luigi Sorrentino
July 31	Ra'anana, Israel; Hard; M15; Singles and Doubles Draws	(Israel) Yshai Oliel; 6–2, 6–0	(Israel) Amit Vales	(Israel) Jordan Hasson (Luxembourg) Alex Knaff	(Israel) Vladimir Bazilevskiy (India) Rishab Agarwal (Israel) Ofek Shimanov (Israel) Lior Goldenberg
July 31	Ra'anana, Israel; Hard; M15; Singles and Doubles Draws	(United Kingdom) James Davis (United Kingdom) Ben Jones; 5–7, 7–6^{(7–2)}, [10–8]	(Israel) Lior Goldenberg (Israel) Yshai Oliel	(Israel) Jordan Hasson (Luxembourg) Alex Knaff	(Israel) Vladimir Bazilevskiy (India) Rishab Agarwal (Israel) Ofek Shimanov (Israel) Lior Goldenberg
July 31	Xàtiva, Spain; Clay; M15; Singles and Doubles Draws	(Spain) Carlos López Montagud; 6–4, 7–6^{(9–7)}	(Lithuania) Vilius Gaubas	(Netherlands) Ryan Nijboer (Spain) Diego Augusto Barreto Sánchez	(Italy) Andrea Bolla (Spain) Sergio Callejón Hernando (Spain) Pedro Ródenas (Sweden) Jonathan Mridha
July 31	Xàtiva, Spain; Clay; M15; Singles and Doubles Draws	(Spain) Jorge Plans (United Kingdom) Giacomo Revelli; 6–7^{(7–9)}, 7–6^{(7–4)}, [10–5]	(United Kingdom) Felix Mischker (United Kingdom) Raffaello Papajcik	(Netherlands) Ryan Nijboer (Spain) Diego Augusto Barreto Sánchez	(Italy) Andrea Bolla (Spain) Sergio Callejón Hernando (Spain) Pedro Ródenas (Sweden) Jonathan Mridha
July 31	Caloundra, Australia; Hard; M15; Singles and Doubles Draws	(Australia) Luke Saville; 7–5, 6–0	(New Zealand) Isaac Becroft	(Australia) Jake Delaney (Northern Mariana Islands) Colin Sinclair	(Japan) Keisuke Saitoh (Australia) Moerani Bouzige (Australia) Casey Hoole (Japan) Daisuke Sumizawa
July 31	Caloundra, Australia; Hard; M15; Singles and Doubles Draws	(Japan) Keisuke Saitoh (Japan) Naoki Tajima; 6–3, 6–1	(Australia) Dayne Kelly (Australia) Jake Delaney	(Australia) Jake Delaney (Northern Mariana Islands) Colin Sinclair	(Japan) Keisuke Saitoh (Australia) Moerani Bouzige (Australia) Casey Hoole (Japan) Daisuke Sumizawa
July 31	Eindhoven, Netherlands; Clay; M15; Singles and Doubles Draws	(Germany) Adrian Oetzbach; 6–7^{(5–7)}, 7–6^{(7–1)}, 7–6^{(7–4)}	(Denmark) Elmer Møller	(Netherlands) Sander Jong (Netherlands) Stijn Paardekooper	(Poland) Marcel Zieliński (Germany) Tom Gentzsch (Netherlands) Jip van Assendelft (Netherlands) Jurriaan Bol
July 31	Eindhoven, Netherlands; Clay; M15; Singles and Doubles Draws	(Netherlands) Brian Bozemoj (Netherlands) Stijn Paardekooper; 6–1, 6–7^{(9–11)}, [13–11]	(Germany) Tim Rühl (Germany) Patrick Zahraj	(Netherlands) Sander Jong (Netherlands) Stijn Paardekooper	(Poland) Marcel Zieliński (Germany) Tom Gentzsch (Netherlands) Jip van Assendelft (Netherlands) Jurriaan Bol
July 31	Monastir, Tunisia; Hard; M15; Singles and Doubles Draws	(Spain) Alberto Barroso Campos; 6–3, 6–4	(Greece) Alexandros Skorilas	(Australia) Kody Pearson (Italy) Stefano Reitano	(United States) Michael Zhu (France) Arthur Bouquier (Italy) Alessandro Coccioli (Italy) Omar Brigida
July 31	Monastir, Tunisia; Hard; M15; Singles and Doubles Draws	(Australia) Kody Pearson (Mexico) Alan Fernando Rubio Fierros; 7–6^{(7–5)}, 6–4	(Bulgaria) Nikolay Nedelchev (United States) Michael Zhu	(Australia) Kody Pearson (Italy) Stefano Reitano	(United States) Michael Zhu (France) Arthur Bouquier (Italy) Alessandro Coccioli (Italy) Omar Brigida

=== August ===
Week of	Tournament	Winner	Runners-up	Semifinalists	Quarterfinalists
August 7	Roehampton, Great Britain; Hard; M25; Singles and Doubles Draws	(United Kingdom) Jack Pinnington Jones; 6–4, 7–6^{(7–3)}	(Estonia) Daniil Glinka	(United Kingdom) Daniel Cox (United Kingdom) Paul Jubb	(United Kingdom) Michael Shaw (United Kingdom) Toby Samuel (United Kingdom) Oscar Weightman (United Kingdom) Oliver Tarvet
August 7	Roehampton, Great Britain; Hard; M25; Singles and Doubles Draws	(United Kingdom) Emile Hudd (United Kingdom) Johannus Monday; 7–6^{(10–8)}, 7–6^{(7–4)}	(United Kingdom) Millen Hurrion (United Kingdom) Daniel Little	(United Kingdom) Daniel Cox (United Kingdom) Paul Jubb	(United Kingdom) Michael Shaw (United Kingdom) Toby Samuel (United Kingdom) Oscar Weightman (United Kingdom) Oliver Tarvet
August 7	Herzlia, Israel; Hard; M25; Singles and Doubles Draws	(Israel) Orel Kimhi; 2–6, 6–2, 7–6^{(10–8)}	(Italy) Andrea Guerrieri	(Israel) Amit Vales (Poland) Filip Peliwo	(Turkey) Yankı Erel (United Kingdom) Hamish Stewart (Israel) Yshai Oliel (Israel) Ron Ellouck
August 7	Herzlia, Israel; Hard; M25; Singles and Doubles Draws	(United Kingdom) James Davis (United Kingdom) Ben Jones; 7–6^{(7–4)}, 6–4	(Czech Republic) David Poljak (United Kingdom) Hamish Stewart	(Israel) Amit Vales (Poland) Filip Peliwo	(Turkey) Yankı Erel (United Kingdom) Hamish Stewart (Israel) Yshai Oliel (Israel) Ron Ellouck
August 7	Southaven, United States; Hard; M25; Singles and Doubles Draws	(Luxembourg) Chris Rodesch; 6–7^{(3–7)}, 6–1, 6–3	(United States) Martin Damm	(Ecuador) Andrés Andrade (United States) Andres Martin	(United Kingdom) Aidan McHugh (United States) AJ Catanzariti (United States) Michael Zheng (United States) Keshav Chopra
August 7	Southaven, United States; Hard; M25; Singles and Doubles Draws	(United States) Ryan Seggerman (United States) Patrik Trhac; 6–4, 6–3	(Australia) Patrick Harper (Japan) Shunsuke Mitsui	(Ecuador) Andrés Andrade (United States) Andres Martin	(United Kingdom) Aidan McHugh (United States) AJ Catanzariti (United States) Michael Zheng (United States) Keshav Chopra
August 7	Osijek, Croatia; Clay; M25; Singles and Doubles Draws	(Croatia) Luka Mikrut; 6–4, 6–4	(Argentina) Valerio Aboian	(Romania) Sebastian Gima (Germany) Sebastian Prechtel	(Croatia) Matej Dodig (Serbia) Dušan Obradović (Serbia) Romeo Hadžimehmedović (Austria) Sebastian Sorger
August 7	Osijek, Croatia; Clay; M25; Singles and Doubles Draws	(Croatia) Matej Dodig (Croatia) Luka Mikrut; 6–1, 6–2	(Croatia) Marino Jakić (Serbia) Stefan Milićević	(Romania) Sebastian Gima (Germany) Sebastian Prechtel	(Croatia) Matej Dodig (Serbia) Dušan Obradović (Serbia) Romeo Hadžimehmedović (Austria) Sebastian Sorger
August 7	Łódź, Poland; Clay; M25; Singles and Doubles Draws	(Czech Republic) Andrew Paulson; 6–4, 4–6, 6–4	(Czech Republic) Daniel Pátý	(Lithuania) Vilius Gaubas (Czech Republic) Jakub Nicod	(Czech Republic) Jiří Barnat (Finland) Patrick Kaukovalta (Poland) Filip Pieczonka (Poland) Aleksander Orlikowski
August 7	Łódź, Poland; Clay; M25; Singles and Doubles Draws	(Czech Republic) Matyáš Černý (Czech Republic) Daniel Pátý; 6–3, 6–3	(Slovakia) Miloš Karol (Poland) Szymon Kielan	(Lithuania) Vilius Gaubas (Czech Republic) Jakub Nicod	(Czech Republic) Jiří Barnat (Finland) Patrick Kaukovalta (Poland) Filip Pieczonka (Poland) Aleksander Orlikowski
August 7	Baotou, China; Clay (i); M25; Singles and Doubles Draws	Mikalai Haliak; 6–4, 6–7^{(4–7)}, 6–3	(China) Te Rigele	(United States) Evan Zhu (Switzerland) Luca Castelnuovo	(South Korea) Lee Duck-hee (China) Li Hanwen (China) Mo Yecong (China) Mu Tao
August 7	Baotou, China; Clay (i); M25; Singles and Doubles Draws	(Chinese Taipei) Ray Ho (United States) Evan Zhu; 6–3, 6–4	(China) Dong Bohua (China) Gao Xin	(United States) Evan Zhu (Switzerland) Luca Castelnuovo	(South Korea) Lee Duck-hee (China) Li Hanwen (China) Mo Yecong (China) Mu Tao
August 7	Jakarta, Indonesia; Hard; M25; Singles and Doubles Draws	(France) Arthur Weber; 4–6, 7–5, 7–5	(Sweden) Leo Borg	(Australia) Blake Mott (Thailand) Palaphoom Kovapitukted	(Ukraine) Yurii Dzhavakian (Japan) Sora Fukuda (Indonesia) Muhammad Rifqi Fitriadi (India) S D Prajwal Dev
August 7	Jakarta, Indonesia; Hard; M25; Singles and Doubles Draws	(Indonesia) Nathan Anthony Barki (Indonesia) Christopher Rungkat; 6–2, 4–6, [10–1]	(South Korea) Han Seon-yong (South Korea) Lee Jea-moon	(Australia) Blake Mott (Thailand) Palaphoom Kovapitukted	(Ukraine) Yurii Dzhavakian (Japan) Sora Fukuda (Indonesia) Muhammad Rifqi Fitriadi (India) S D Prajwal Dev
August 7	Arequipa, Peru; Clay; M15; Singles and Doubles Draws	(Ecuador) Álvaro Guillén Meza; 6–4, 6–3	(Argentina) Guido Iván Justo	(Chile) Ignacio Antonio Becerra Otarola (Chile) Daniel Antonio Núñez	(Argentina) Juan Manuel La Serna (Peru) Arklon Huertas del Pino (Peru) Alberto Odiseo Alvarado Berrospi (Argentina) Tomás Farjat
August 7	Arequipa, Peru; Clay; M15; Singles and Doubles Draws	(Peru) Arklon Huertas del Pino (Chile) Matías Soto; 7–5, 6–1	(Colombia) Nicolás Buitrago (Colombia) Juan Sebastián Osorio	(Chile) Ignacio Antonio Becerra Otarola (Chile) Daniel Antonio Núñez	(Argentina) Juan Manuel La Serna (Peru) Arklon Huertas del Pino (Peru) Alberto Odiseo Alvarado Berrospi (Argentina) Tomás Farjat
August 7	Curtea de Argeș, Romania; Clay; M15; Singles and Doubles Draws	(Romania) Gabi Adrian Boitan; 6–4, 6–4	(Romania) Radu Mihai Papoe	(Bulgaria) Petr Nesterov (Italy) Gabriele Pennaforti	(Romania) Cezar Crețu (Romania) Calin Teodor Știrbu (Argentina) Luciano Emanuel Ambrogi (Romania) Dan Alexandru Tomescu
August 7	Curtea de Argeș, Romania; Clay; M15; Singles and Doubles Draws	(Germany) Nino Ehrenschneider (France) Quentin Folliot; 6–3, 6–3	(Romania) Vladimir Filip (Romania) Valentin Vanta	(Bulgaria) Petr Nesterov (Italy) Gabriele Pennaforti	(Romania) Cezar Crețu (Romania) Calin Teodor Știrbu (Argentina) Luciano Emanuel Ambrogi (Romania) Dan Alexandru Tomescu
August 7	Pescara, Italy; Clay; M15; Singles and Doubles Draws	(Italy) Luca Castagnola; 6–2, 3–6, 6–1	(Italy) Luciano Carraro	(Italy) Peter Buldorini (Italy) Giulio Perego	(Italy) Facundo Juárez (Italy) Marco Miceli (Italy) Carlo Alberto Caniato (Argentina) Lorenzo Gagliardo
August 7	Pescara, Italy; Clay; M15; Singles and Doubles Draws	(Italy) Andrea Picchione (Italy) Giorgio Ricca; 6–7^{(3–7)}, 6–3, [10–8]	(Italy) Carlo Alberto Caniato (Italy) Gabriele Vulpitta	(Italy) Peter Buldorini (Italy) Giulio Perego	(Italy) Facundo Juárez (Italy) Marco Miceli (Italy) Carlo Alberto Caniato (Argentina) Lorenzo Gagliardo
August 7	Frankfurt Am Main, Germany; Clay; M15; Singles and Doubles Draws	(Germany) Lucas Gerch; 6–4, 6–1	(Germany) Jakob Schnaitter	(Republic of Ireland) Michael Agwi (Germany) Dominik Böhler	(Germany) Johannes Härteis (Germany) Florian Broska (Georgia (country)) Aleksandre Metreveli; Andrey Chepelev
August 7	Frankfurt Am Main, Germany; Clay; M15; Singles and Doubles Draws	(Germany) Johannes Härteis (Germany) Niklas Schell; 3–6, 7–6^{(7–1)}, [10–8]	(Germany) Jakob Schnaitter (Germany) Mark Wallner	(Republic of Ireland) Michael Agwi (Germany) Dominik Böhler	(Germany) Johannes Härteis (Germany) Florian Broska (Georgia (country)) Aleksandre Metreveli; Andrey Chepelev
August 7	Eupen, Belgium; Clay; M15; Singles and Doubles Draws	(Germany) Marlon Vankan; 7–5, 7–6^{(7–3)}	(Germany) Marc Majdandzic	(Belgium) Simon Beaupain (Germany) Peter Heller	(Belgium) Alessio Basile (France) Axel Garcian (France) César Bouchelaghem (Germany) Luca Wiedenmann
August 7	Eupen, Belgium; Clay; M15; Singles and Doubles Draws	(Netherlands) Brian Bozemoj (Netherlands) Stijn Pel; 6–3, 6–3	(Germany) Ruben Hartig (Germany) Luca Matteo Sobbe	(Belgium) Simon Beaupain (Germany) Peter Heller	(Belgium) Alessio Basile (France) Axel Garcian (France) César Bouchelaghem (Germany) Luca Wiedenmann
August 7	Monastir, Tunisia; Hard; M15; Singles and Doubles Draws	(Spain) Alberto Barroso Campos; 6–2, 4–6, 6–3	(France) Étienne Donnet	Mikhail Gorokhov (Italy) Daniele Rapagnetta	(Tunisia) Skander Mansouri (Mexico) Alan Fernando Rubio Fierros; Aleksandr Lobanov (South Africa) Kris van Wyk
August 7	Monastir, Tunisia; Hard; M15; Singles and Doubles Draws	(Italy) Stefano Reitano (Slovakia) Lukáš Pokorný; 6–3, 6–4	(Mexico) Daniel Moreno (Mexico) Alan Fernando Rubio Fierros	Mikhail Gorokhov (Italy) Daniele Rapagnetta	(Tunisia) Skander Mansouri (Mexico) Alan Fernando Rubio Fierros; Aleksandr Lobanov (South Africa) Kris van Wyk
August 14	Aldershot, Great Britain; Hard; M25; Singles and Doubles Draws	(United Kingdom) Arthur Fery; 6–4, 6–4	(United Kingdom) Toby Samuel	(United Kingdom) Henry Searle (France) Robin Bertrand	(United Kingdom) Johannus Monday (United Kingdom) Hamish Stewart (United Kingdom) Millen Hurrion (United Kingdom) Finn Bass
August 14	Aldershot, Great Britain; Hard; M25; Singles and Doubles Draws	(United Kingdom) Emile Hudd (United Kingdom) Johannus Monday; 6–3, 3–6, [10–8]	(United Kingdom) Arthur Fery (United Kingdom) Anton Matusevich	(United Kingdom) Henry Searle (France) Robin Bertrand	(United Kingdom) Johannus Monday (United Kingdom) Hamish Stewart (United Kingdom) Millen Hurrion (United Kingdom) Finn Bass
August 14	Tainan, Chinese Taipei; Clay; M25; Singles and Doubles Draws	(Turkey) Ergi Kırkın; 6–0, 6–2	(Japan) Makoto Ochi	(Chinese Taipei) Huang Tsung-hao (Japan) Kazuki Nishiwaki	(Chinese Taipei) Yin Bang-shuo (Hungary) Mátyás Füle; Alexander Chepik (Japan) Taisei Ichikawa
August 14	Tainan, Chinese Taipei; Clay; M25; Singles and Doubles Draws	(Chinese Taipei) Huang Tsung-hao (India) Sai Karteek Reddy Ganta; 6–3, 6–4	(Japan) Tomohiro Masabayashi (Japan) Koki Matsuda	(Chinese Taipei) Huang Tsung-hao (Japan) Kazuki Nishiwaki	(Chinese Taipei) Yin Bang-shuo (Hungary) Mátyás Füle; Alexander Chepik (Japan) Taisei Ichikawa
August 14	Koksijde, Belgium; Clay; M25; Singles and Doubles Draws	(Netherlands) Guy den Ouden; 7–5, 6–2	(France) Timo Legout	(Argentina) Luciano Emanuel Ambrogi (Germany) Jeremy Jahn	(Argentina) Hernán Casanova (Belgium) Buvaysar Gadamauri (Argentina) Mariano Kestelboim (Germany) Marlon Vankan
August 14	Koksijde, Belgium; Clay; M25; Singles and Doubles Draws	(Germany) Jeremy Jahn (Germany) Marlon Vankan; 6–3, 7–6^{(7–5)}	(Netherlands) Dax Donders (Netherlands) Sidané Pontjodikromo	(Argentina) Luciano Emanuel Ambrogi (Germany) Jeremy Jahn	(Argentina) Hernán Casanova (Belgium) Buvaysar Gadamauri (Argentina) Mariano Kestelboim (Germany) Marlon Vankan
August 14	Ystad, Sweden; Clay; M25; Singles and Doubles Draws	(Germany) Marvin Möller; 2–6, 6–3, 7–5	(Monaco) Valentin Vacherot	(Finland) Eero Vasa (Sweden) Karl Friberg	(Sweden) Jonathan Mridha (Netherlands) Stijn Pel (Sweden) Max Dahlin (Romania) Filip Cristian Jianu
August 14	Ystad, Sweden; Clay; M25; Singles and Doubles Draws	(Finland) Eero Vasa (Sweden) Olle Wallin; 7–6^{(8–6)}, 6–2	(Germany) Noah Schlagenhauf (Sweden) Isac Strömberg	(Finland) Eero Vasa (Sweden) Karl Friberg	(Sweden) Jonathan Mridha (Netherlands) Stijn Pel (Sweden) Max Dahlin (Romania) Filip Cristian Jianu
August 14	Muttenz, Switzerland; Clay; M25; Singles and Doubles Draws	(France) Matteo Martineau; 6–1, 6–7^{(4–7)}, 6–3	(Italy) Alexander Weis	(Brazil) Nicolas Zanellato (France) Maxime Mora	(Germany) Daniel Masur (Switzerland) Jeffrey von der Schulenburg (Switzerland) Damien Wenger; Andrey Chepelev
August 14	Muttenz, Switzerland; Clay; M25; Singles and Doubles Draws	(France) Matteo Martineau (Germany) Daniel Masur; 7–5, 7–6^{(7–3)}	(Switzerland) Yannik Steinegger (Switzerland) Damien Wenger	(Brazil) Nicolas Zanellato (France) Maxime Mora	(Germany) Daniel Masur (Switzerland) Jeffrey von der Schulenburg (Switzerland) Damien Wenger; Andrey Chepelev
August 14	Bielsko-Biała, Poland; Clay; M25; Singles and Doubles Draws	(Argentina) Juan Bautista Torres; 6–4, 7–5	(Czech Republic) Hynek Bartoň	(Czech Republic) Daniel Pátý (Italy) Tommaso Compagnucci	(Czech Republic) Jiří Barnat (Poland) Olaf Pieczkowski (Poland) Maciej Rajski (Ukraine) Viacheslav Bielinskyi
August 14	Bielsko-Biała, Poland; Clay; M25; Singles and Doubles Draws	(Czech Republic) Jiří Barnat (Czech Republic) Filip Duda; 6–4, 7–5	(Poland) Jasza Szajrych (Poland) Borys Zgoła	(Czech Republic) Daniel Pátý (Italy) Tommaso Compagnucci	(Czech Republic) Jiří Barnat (Poland) Olaf Pieczkowski (Poland) Maciej Rajski (Ukraine) Viacheslav Bielinskyi
August 14	Yinchuan, China; Hard; M25; Singles and Doubles Draws	(China) Cui Jie; 6–3, 7–5	(China) Sun Fajing	(Czech Republic) Dominik Palán (China) Bai Yan	(South Korea) Lee Duck-hee (China) Wang Aoran (Thailand) Wishaya Trongcharoenchaikul (United States) Evan Zhu
August 14	Yinchuan, China; Hard; M25; Singles and Doubles Draws	(Thailand) Wishaya Trongcharoenchaikul (China) Xiao Linang; 6–4, 7–6^{(7–5)}	(China) Sun Qian (China) Tang Sheng	(Czech Republic) Dominik Palán (China) Bai Yan	(South Korea) Lee Duck-hee (China) Wang Aoran (Thailand) Wishaya Trongcharoenchaikul (United States) Evan Zhu
August 14	Jakarta, Indonesia; Hard; M25; Singles and Doubles Draws	(Sweden) Leo Borg; 6–2, 6–0	(Australia) Blake Mott	(Indonesia) Muhammad Rifqi Fitriadi (Japan) Sora Fukuda	(India) S D Prajwal Dev (Uzbekistan) Khumoyun Sultanov (Thailand) Palaphoom Kovapitukted (Japan) Yuta Kawahashi
August 14	Jakarta, Indonesia; Hard; M25; Singles and Doubles Draws	(Greece) Markos Kalovelonis (Uzbekistan) Khumoyun Sultanov; 4–6, 7–5, [10–7]	(Thailand) Palaphoom Kovapitukted (India) Manish Sureshkumar	(Indonesia) Muhammad Rifqi Fitriadi (Japan) Sora Fukuda	(India) S D Prajwal Dev (Uzbekistan) Khumoyun Sultanov (Thailand) Palaphoom Kovapitukted (Japan) Yuta Kawahashi
August 14	Trujillo, Peru; Clay; M25; Singles and Doubles Draws	(Brazil) Gustavo Heide; 6–3, 6–0	(Argentina) Juan Pablo Ficovich	(Peru) Gonzalo Bueno (Bolivia) Murkel Dellien	(Dominican Republic) Roberto Cid Subervi (United States) Bruno Kuzuhara (Uruguay) Ignacio Carou (Brazil) Pedro Boscardin Dias
August 14	Trujillo, Peru; Clay; M25; Singles and Doubles Draws	(Colombia) Juan Sebastián Gómez (Colombia) Andrés Urrea; 7–5, 6–4	(Argentina) Tomás Farjat (Argentina) Gonzalo Villanueva	(Peru) Gonzalo Bueno (Bolivia) Murkel Dellien	(Dominican Republic) Roberto Cid Subervi (United States) Bruno Kuzuhara (Uruguay) Ignacio Carou (Brazil) Pedro Boscardin Dias
August 14	Târgu Jiu, Romania; Clay; M15; Singles and Doubles Draws	(Romania) Dan Alexandru Tomescu; 2–6, 6–3, 6–2	(Romania) Gabi Adrian Boitan	(Argentina) Juan Pablo Paz (Moldova) Ilya Snițari	(Bulgaria) Simon Anthony Ivanov (Italy) Alessandro Bellifemine (Bulgaria) Petr Nesterov (Argentina) Lorenzo Joaquín Rodríguez
August 14	Târgu Jiu, Romania; Clay; M15; Singles and Doubles Draws	(Italy) Elio José Ribeiro Lago (Argentina) Lorenzo Joaquín Rodríguez; 6–4, 6–4	(Romania) Alexandru Cristian Dumitru (Romania) Dan Alexandru Tomescu	(Argentina) Juan Pablo Paz (Moldova) Ilya Snițari	(Bulgaria) Simon Anthony Ivanov (Italy) Alessandro Bellifemine (Bulgaria) Petr Nesterov (Argentina) Lorenzo Joaquín Rodríguez
August 14	Kottingbrunn, Austria; Clay; M15; Singles and Doubles Draws	(Croatia) Matej Dodig; 6–4, 7–5	Marat Sharipov	(Austria) Neil Oberleitner (Austria) David Pichler	(Italy) Gabriele Bosio (Croatia) Luka Mikrut (Austria) Joel Schwärzler (Slovenia) Bor Artnak
August 14	Kottingbrunn, Austria; Clay; M15; Singles and Doubles Draws	(Czech Republic) Dominik Kellovský (Austria) Joel Schwärzler; 3–6, 6–3, [10–4]	(Slovakia) Miloš Karol (Austria) David Pichler	(Austria) Neil Oberleitner (Austria) David Pichler	(Italy) Gabriele Bosio (Croatia) Luka Mikrut (Austria) Joel Schwärzler (Slovenia) Bor Artnak
August 14	Belém, Brazil; Hard; M15; Singles and Doubles Draws	(Mexico) Rodrigo Pacheco Méndez; 6–1, 6–0	(Brazil) Gilbert Klier Júnior	(Chile) Ignacio Antonio Becerra Otarola (Brazil) Mateo Barreiros Reyes	(France) Jean-Christian Morandais (Brazil) João Eduardo Schiessl (Brazil) Fernando Yamacita (Colombia) Juan Sebastián Osorio
August 14	Belém, Brazil; Hard; M15; Singles and Doubles Draws	(Brazil) Gabriel Roveri Sidney (Brazil) Fernando Yamacita; 6–1, 7–5	(Chile) Ignacio Antonio Becerra Otarola (Chile) Daniel Antonio Núñez	(Chile) Ignacio Antonio Becerra Otarola (Brazil) Mateo Barreiros Reyes	(France) Jean-Christian Morandais (Brazil) João Eduardo Schiessl (Brazil) Fernando Yamacita (Colombia) Juan Sebastián Osorio
August 14	Überlingen, Germany; Clay; M15; Singles and Doubles Draws	(Germany) Jakob Schnaitter; 6–7^{(2–7)}, 6–1, 6–2	(Germany) Max Hans Rehberg	(Germany) David Fix (France) Arthur Nagel	(Georgia (country)) Aleksandre Metreveli (China) Fnu Nidunjianzan (Germany) Adrian Oetzbach (Germany) Lasse Pörtner
August 14	Überlingen, Germany; Clay; M15; Singles and Doubles Draws	(Germany) Taym Al Azmeh (Syria) Hazem Naw; 7–5, 3–6, [10–7]	(Germany) Jakob Schnaitter (Germany) Mark Wallner	(Germany) David Fix (France) Arthur Nagel	(Georgia (country)) Aleksandre Metreveli (China) Fnu Nidunjianzan (Germany) Adrian Oetzbach (Germany) Lasse Pörtner
August 14	Monastir, Tunisia; Hard; M15; Singles and Doubles Draws	(United States) Garrett Johns; 6–7^{(3–7)}, 6–2, 6–3	(Slovakia) Lukáš Pokorný	(South Africa) Kris van Wyk (France) Enzo Wallart	(France) Maxence Beaugé (Morocco) Younes Lalami Laaroussi (Tunisia) Aziz Ouakaa (France) Étienne Donnet
August 14	Monastir, Tunisia; Hard; M15; Singles and Doubles Draws	(United States) Ryan Seggerman (United States) Patrik Trhac; 6–1, 6–3	(Italy) Luca Fantini (Morocco) Younes Lalami Laaroussi	(South Africa) Kris van Wyk (France) Enzo Wallart	(France) Maxence Beaugé (Morocco) Younes Lalami Laaroussi (Tunisia) Aziz Ouakaa (France) Étienne Donnet
August 21	Santander, Spain; Clay; M25; Singles and Doubles Draws	Svyatoslav Gulin; 6–7^{(5–7)}, 6–4, 6–4	(Lithuania) Vilius Gaubas	(Spain) Imanol López Morillo (Spain) Benjamín Winter López	(Spain) Álvaro López San Martín (Spain) Sergi Pérez Contri (Netherlands) Ryan Nijboer (Spain) Carlos Sánchez Jover
August 21	Santander, Spain; Clay; M25; Singles and Doubles Draws	(Argentina) Mariano Kestelboim (Spain) Álvaro López San Martín; 6–3, 7–5	Svyatoslav Gulin (Spain) Bruno Pujol Navarro	(Spain) Imanol López Morillo (Spain) Benjamín Winter López	(Spain) Álvaro López San Martín (Spain) Sergi Pérez Contri (Netherlands) Ryan Nijboer (Spain) Carlos Sánchez Jover
August 21	Idanha-a-Nova, Portugal; Hard; M25; Singles and Doubles Draws	(France) Dan Added; 6–2, 6–2	(Spain) Alberto Barroso Campos	(Poland) Kacper Żuk (Spain) Rafael Izquierdo Luque	(United Kingdom) Arthur Fery (Spain) Ricardo Villacorta (Czech Republic) David Poljak (United States) Christian Langmo
August 21	Idanha-a-Nova, Portugal; Hard; M25; Singles and Doubles Draws	(France) Dan Added (Tunisia) Skander Mansouri; 7–5, 6–4	(Spain) Alberto Barroso Campos (Czech Republic) David Poljak	(Poland) Kacper Żuk (Spain) Rafael Izquierdo Luque	(United Kingdom) Arthur Fery (Spain) Ricardo Villacorta (Czech Republic) David Poljak (United States) Christian Langmo
August 21	Tainan, Chinese Taipei; Clay; M25; Singles and Doubles Draws	(Hungary) Mátyás Füle; 6–2, 6–2	(India) Rishab Agarwal	(Turkey) Ergi Kırkın (Japan) Kazuki Nishiwaki	(Japan) Takuya Kumasaka (Chinese Taipei) Yin Bang-shuo (Japan) Yamato Sueoka (India) Digvijay Pratap Singh
August 21	Tainan, Chinese Taipei; Clay; M25; Singles and Doubles Draws	Ivan Denisov (Bulgaria) Leonid Sheyngezikht; 6–2, 6–4	(Japan) Taisei Ichikawa (Japan) Seita Watanabe	(Turkey) Ergi Kırkın (Japan) Kazuki Nishiwaki	(Japan) Takuya Kumasaka (Chinese Taipei) Yin Bang-shuo (Japan) Yamato Sueoka (India) Digvijay Pratap Singh
August 21	Lesa, Italy; Clay; M25; Singles and Doubles Draws	(France) Clément Tabur; 3–6, 6–4, 6–1	(Germany) Tim Handel	(Italy) Lorenzo Carboni (Italy) Federico Arnaboldi	(Italy) Alessandro Pecci (France) Timo Legout (Italy) Fausto Tabacco (Italy) Giuseppe La Vela
August 21	Lesa, Italy; Clay; M25; Singles and Doubles Draws	(Italy) Gabriele Maria Noce (Italy) Augusto Virgili; 7–6^{(7–5)}, 7–6^{(7–5)}	(Italy) Andrea Arnaboldi (Italy) Federico Arnaboldi	(Italy) Lorenzo Carboni (Italy) Federico Arnaboldi	(Italy) Alessandro Pecci (France) Timo Legout (Italy) Fausto Tabacco (Italy) Giuseppe La Vela
August 21	Poznań, Poland; Clay; M25; Singles and Doubles Draws	(Argentina) Lorenzo Joaquín Rodríguez; 4–6, 6–4, 6–1	(Ukraine) Georgii Kravchenko	(Germany) Kai Wehnelt (Ukraine) Viacheslav Bielinskyi	(Netherlands) Sander Jong (Poland) Maciej Rajski (Israel) Yshai Oliel (Germany) Jeremy Jahn
August 21	Poznań, Poland; Clay; M25; Singles and Doubles Draws	(Poland) Piotr Matuszewski (Germany) Kai Wehnelt; 3–6, 7–6^{(7–3)}, [10–4]	(Netherlands) Sander Jong (Netherlands) Jesse Timmermans	(Germany) Kai Wehnelt (Ukraine) Viacheslav Bielinskyi	(Netherlands) Sander Jong (Poland) Maciej Rajski (Israel) Yshai Oliel (Germany) Jeremy Jahn
August 21	Trier, Germany; Clay; M15; Singles and Doubles Draws	(Syria) Hazem Naw; 6–4, 6–2	(Germany) Tom Gentzsch	(Germany) Tom Schönenberg (France) Amaury Raynel	(Germany) Jannik Maute (Germany) Max Wiskandt (Czech Republic) Yvo Panák (Czech Republic) Štěpán Baum
August 21	Trier, Germany; Clay; M15; Singles and Doubles Draws	(South Africa) Alec Beckley (France) Quentin Folliot; 6–3, 4–6, [10–2]	(Germany) Kai Lemstra (Germany) Marlon Vankan	(Germany) Tom Schönenberg (France) Amaury Raynel	(Germany) Jannik Maute (Germany) Max Wiskandt (Czech Republic) Yvo Panák (Czech Republic) Štěpán Baum
August 21	Huy, Belgium; Clay; M15; Singles and Doubles Draws	(Netherlands) Thiemo de Bakker; 6–3, 6–3	(Netherlands) Sidané Pontjodikromo	(Belgium) Buvaysar Gadamauri (United States) Felix Corwin	(Germany) John Sperle (Netherlands) Jurriaan Bol (Belgium) Simon Beaupain (Netherlands) Jarno Jans
August 21	Huy, Belgium; Clay; M15; Singles and Doubles Draws	(United States) Felix Corwin (Australia) Lawrence Sciglitano; 6–3, 6–0	(Netherlands) Sidané Pontjodikromo (Netherlands) Daniël Verbeek	(Belgium) Buvaysar Gadamauri (United States) Felix Corwin	(Germany) John Sperle (Netherlands) Jurriaan Bol (Belgium) Simon Beaupain (Netherlands) Jarno Jans
August 21	Caslano, Switzerland; Clay; M15; Singles and Doubles Draws	(Switzerland) Mika Brunold; 6–3, 6–2	(Italy) Andrea Picchione	Andrey Chepelev (Switzerland) Jakub Paul	(Italy) Luca Giacomini (Italy) Andrea Militi Ribaldi (Italy) Luigi Sorrentino (Germany) Patrick Zahraj
August 21	Caslano, Switzerland; Clay; M15; Singles and Doubles Draws	(Switzerland) Noah Lopez (Switzerland) Louroi Martinez; 6–4, 5–7, [10–4]	(Switzerland) Gabriele Moghini (Switzerland) Nicolás Parizzia	Andrey Chepelev (Switzerland) Jakub Paul	(Italy) Luca Giacomini (Italy) Andrea Militi Ribaldi (Italy) Luigi Sorrentino (Germany) Patrick Zahraj
August 21	Nakhon Si Thammarat, Thailand; Hard; M15; Singles and Doubles Draws	(Kazakhstan) Grigoriy Lomakin; 7–6^{(7–2)}, 4–6, 6–3	(Thailand) Kasidit Samrej	(Thailand) Thanapet Chanta (Thailand) Palaphoom Kovapitukted	(Uzbekistan) Khumoyun Sultanov (Thailand) Yuttana Charoenphon (Thailand) Maximus Jones (United States) Collin Altamirano
August 21	Nakhon Si Thammarat, Thailand; Hard; M15; Singles and Doubles Draws	(China) Sun Qian (China) Tang Sheng; 6–4, 6–7^{(4–7)}, [10–7]	(Japan) Yuta Kawahashi (Japan) Ryotaro Taguchi	(Thailand) Thanapet Chanta (Thailand) Palaphoom Kovapitukted	(Uzbekistan) Khumoyun Sultanov (Thailand) Yuttana Charoenphon (Thailand) Maximus Jones (United States) Collin Altamirano
August 21	São Paulo, Brazil; Clay; M15; Singles and Doubles Draws	(Brazil) Eduardo Ribeiro; 6–4, 7–6^{(8–6)}	(Chile) Daniel Antonio Núñez	(Chile) Ignacio Antonio Becerra Otarola (Mexico) Rodrigo Pacheco Méndez	(Brazil) João Eduardo Schiessl (Brazil) Rafael Tosetto (Brazil) Gustavo Ribeiro de Almeida (Argentina) Francisco Pini
August 21	São Paulo, Brazil; Clay; M15; Singles and Doubles Draws	(Brazil) João Victor Couto Loureiro (Brazil) Eduardo Ribeiro; 7–6^{(7–5)}, 6–2	(Chile) Ignacio Antonio Becerra Otarola (Chile) Daniel Antonio Núñez	(Chile) Ignacio Antonio Becerra Otarola (Mexico) Rodrigo Pacheco Méndez	(Brazil) João Eduardo Schiessl (Brazil) Rafael Tosetto (Brazil) Gustavo Ribeiro de Almeida (Argentina) Francisco Pini
August 21	Monastir, Tunisia; Hard; M15; Singles and Doubles Draws	(Senegal) Seydina André; 3–6, 6–2, 7–6^{(8–6)}	(Slovakia) Lukáš Pokorný	(Italy) Luca Fantini (Spain) Martín Landaluce	(United States) Ryan Seggerman (Australia) Matthew Dellavedova; Yaroslav Demin (United States) Garrett Johns
August 21	Monastir, Tunisia; Hard; M15; Singles and Doubles Draws	(United States) Ryan Seggerman (United States) Patrik Trhac; 6–4, 7–5	(Slovakia) Lukáš Pokorný (South Africa) Kris van Wyk	(Italy) Luca Fantini (Spain) Martín Landaluce	(United States) Ryan Seggerman (Australia) Matthew Dellavedova; Yaroslav Demin (United States) Garrett Johns
August 28	Jablonec nad Nisou, Czech Republic; Clay; M25; Singles and Doubles Draws	(Czech Republic) Martin Krumich; 6–2, 6–0	(Egypt) Mohamed Safwat	(Germany) Timo Stodder (Czech Republic) Hynek Bartoň	(Czech Republic) Jiří Barnat (Argentina) Juan Bautista Torres (Czech Republic) Daniel Siniakov (United States) Toby Kodat
August 28	Jablonec nad Nisou, Czech Republic; Clay; M25; Singles and Doubles Draws	(Czech Republic) Dominik Reček (Czech Republic) Daniel Siniakov; 7–5, 6–2	(Czech Republic) Martin Beneš (Czech Republic) Jakub Novák	(Germany) Timo Stodder (Czech Republic) Hynek Bartoň	(Czech Republic) Jiří Barnat (Argentina) Juan Bautista Torres (Czech Republic) Daniel Siniakov (United States) Toby Kodat
August 28	Idanha-a-Nova, Portugal; Hard; M25; Singles and Doubles Draws	(Portugal) Gonçalo Oliveira; 6–4, 6–4	(Spain) Alberto Barroso Campos	(France) Robin Bertrand (France) Dan Added	(France) Loïc Namigandet Tenguere (Denmark) Johannes Ingildsen (Portugal) Tiago Pereira (Portugal) Duarte Vale
August 28	Idanha-a-Nova, Portugal; Hard; M25; Singles and Doubles Draws	(Denmark) Johannes Ingildsen (United Kingdom) Harry Wendelken; 7–6^{(7–3)}, 6–2	(Portugal) Gonçalo Falcão (Portugal) Tiago Pereira	(France) Robin Bertrand (France) Dan Added	(France) Loïc Namigandet Tenguere (Denmark) Johannes Ingildsen (Portugal) Tiago Pereira (Portugal) Duarte Vale
August 28	Oldenzaal, Netherlands; Clay; M25; Singles and Doubles Draws	(Germany) Lucas Gerch; 7–5, 6–0	(United States) Oliver Crawford	(Germany) Mats Rosenkranz (Netherlands) Max Houkes	(Ukraine) Aleksandr Braynin (The Bahamas) Justin Roberts (Netherlands) Dax Donders (Germany) Jeremy Jahn
August 28	Oldenzaal, Netherlands; Clay; M25; Singles and Doubles Draws	(Netherlands) Sander Jong (Netherlands) Jesse Timmermans; 4–6, 6–4, [10–2]	(Netherlands) Brian Bozemoj (Netherlands) Stijn Pel	(Germany) Mats Rosenkranz (Netherlands) Max Houkes	(Ukraine) Aleksandr Braynin (The Bahamas) Justin Roberts (Netherlands) Dax Donders (Germany) Jeremy Jahn
August 28	Sion, Switzerland; Clay; M25; Singles and Doubles Draws	(Switzerland) Rémy Bertola; 6–2, 7–5	(United Kingdom) Anton Matusevich	(Italy) Federico Iannaccone (Switzerland) Henry von der Schulenburg	(Switzerland) Jakub Paul (Switzerland) Kilian Feldbausch (Switzerland) Damien Wenger (Switzerland) Mika Brunold
August 28	Sion, Switzerland; Clay; M25; Singles and Doubles Draws	(Switzerland) Rémy Bertola (Switzerland) Jakub Paul; 6–1, 6–2	(United States) Ronan Jachuck (Switzerland) Henry von der Schulenburg	(Italy) Federico Iannaccone (Switzerland) Henry von der Schulenburg	(Switzerland) Jakub Paul (Switzerland) Kilian Feldbausch (Switzerland) Damien Wenger (Switzerland) Mika Brunold
August 28	Hong Kong, Hong Kong, China; Hard; M25; Singles and Doubles Draws	(Indonesia) Justin Barki; 4–6, 6–4, 0–0, ret.	(South Korea) Shin San-hui	(Morocco) Adam Moundir (Thailand) Kasidit Samrej	(Japan) Naoki Nakagawa; Egor Gerasimov (Japan) Takuya Kumasaka (New Zealand) Ajeet Rai
August 28	Hong Kong, Hong Kong, China; Hard; M25; Singles and Doubles Draws	Egor Gerasimov (China) Li Zhe; 6–1, 6–4	(Japan) Keisuke Saitoh (Japan) Daisuke Sumizawa	(Morocco) Adam Moundir (Thailand) Kasidit Samrej	(Japan) Naoki Nakagawa; Egor Gerasimov (Japan) Takuya Kumasaka (New Zealand) Ajeet Rai
August 28	Maribor, Slovenia; Clay; M25; Singles and Doubles Draws	(Czech Republic) Michael Vrbenský; 6–3, 6–4	(Brazil) Nicolas Zanellato	(Ukraine) Viacheslav Bielinskyi; Kirill Kivattsev	(Serbia) Stefan Popović (Italy) Marcello Serafini (Austria) Sandro Kopp (Luxembourg) Alex Knaff
August 28	Maribor, Slovenia; Clay; M25; Singles and Doubles Draws	(Croatia) Nikola Bašić (Slovenia) Jan Kupčič; 7–5, 4–6, [11–9]	(Bosnia and Herzegovina) Mirza Bašić (Germany) Marko Topo	(Ukraine) Viacheslav Bielinskyi; Kirill Kivattsev	(Serbia) Stefan Popović (Italy) Marcello Serafini (Austria) Sandro Kopp (Luxembourg) Alex Knaff
August 28	Oviedo, Spain; Clay; M25; Singles and Doubles Draws	(Spain) Carlos López Montagud; 6–1, 3–6, 6–4	(Netherlands) Ryan Nijboer	(Spain) Carlos Gimeno Valero (Italy) Gian Marco Moroni	(Spain) Imanol López Morillo (Spain) Tomás Curras Abasolo (Netherlands) Michiel de Krom (Spain) Alejandro Juan Mano
August 28	Oviedo, Spain; Clay; M25; Singles and Doubles Draws	(United States) Jack Vance (United States) Tennyson Whiting; 6–3, 6–4	Kirill Mishkin; Vitali Shvets	(Spain) Carlos Gimeno Valero (Italy) Gian Marco Moroni	(Spain) Imanol López Morillo (Spain) Tomás Curras Abasolo (Netherlands) Michiel de Krom (Spain) Alejandro Juan Mano
August 28	Szczawno, Poland; Clay; M15; Singles and Doubles Draws	(Poland) Olaf Pieczkowski; 6–1, 6–2	(Poland) Jasza Szajrych	(Germany) Lewie Lane (Poland) Maciej Rajski	(Germany) Patrick Zahraj (Germany) Jonas Pelle Hartenstein (Poland) Paweł Ciaś (Poland) Karol Filar
August 28	Szczawno, Poland; Clay; M15; Singles and Doubles Draws	(South Africa) Alec Beckley (Poland) Jasza Szajrych; 6–3, 6–2	(Paraguay) Hernando José Escurra Isnardi (Argentina) Lorenzo Joaquín Rodríguez	(Germany) Lewie Lane (Poland) Maciej Rajski	(Germany) Patrick Zahraj (Germany) Jonas Pelle Hartenstein (Poland) Paweł Ciaś (Poland) Karol Filar
August 28	Budapest, Hungary; Hard; M15; Singles and Doubles Draws	(United Kingdom) Giles Hussey; 2–6, 6–3, 6–3	(Brazil) Gabriel Décamps	(Hungary) Mátyás Füle (United Kingdom) Hamish Stewart	(Bulgaria) Nikolay Nedelchev (Bosnia and Herzegovina) Aldin Šetkić (Croatia) Vito Tonejc (Georgia (country)) Zura Tkemaladze
August 28	Budapest, Hungary; Hard; M15; Singles and Doubles Draws	(United Kingdom) James Davis (United Kingdom) Matthew Summers; 7–5, 6–0	(United Kingdom) Finn Murgett (United Kingdom) Hamish Stewart	(Hungary) Mátyás Füle (United Kingdom) Hamish Stewart	(Bulgaria) Nikolay Nedelchev (Bosnia and Herzegovina) Aldin Šetkić (Croatia) Vito Tonejc (Georgia (country)) Zura Tkemaladze
August 28	Allershausen, Germany; Clay; M15; Singles and Doubles Draws	(Germany) Nicola Kuhn; 4–6, 7–5, 6–1	(Germany) Adrian Oetzbach	(Germany) Kai Lemstra (Germany) Christoph Negritu	(Germany) Jannik Maute (Netherlands) Daniel de Jonge (Germany) Tom Gentzsch (Germany) Tim Rühl
August 28	Allershausen, Germany; Clay; M15; Singles and Doubles Draws	(Peru) Alexander Merino (Germany) Christoph Negritu; 6–3, 3–6, [10–3]	(Germany) Florian Broska (Austria) Gregor Ramskogler	(Germany) Kai Lemstra (Germany) Christoph Negritu	(Germany) Jannik Maute (Netherlands) Daniel de Jonge (Germany) Tom Gentzsch (Germany) Tim Rühl
August 28	Forlì, Italy; Clay; M15; Singles and Doubles Draws	(Italy) Gabriele Pennaforti; 6–4, 6–2	(Italy) Giorgio Tabacco	(Italy) Daniel Bagnolini (Italy) Andrea Picchione	(Italy) Francesco Forti (Italy) Luca Giacomini (Italy) Luigi Sorrentino (Italy) Manuel Plunger
August 28	Forlì, Italy; Clay; M15; Singles and Doubles Draws	(Italy) Francesco Forti (Italy) Andrea Picchione; 7–5, 6–4	(Italy) Stefano D'Agostino (Italy) Francesco Liucci	(Italy) Daniel Bagnolini (Italy) Andrea Picchione	(Italy) Francesco Forti (Italy) Luca Giacomini (Italy) Luigi Sorrentino (Italy) Manuel Plunger
August 28	Kuršumlijska Banja, Serbia; Clay; M15; Singles and Doubles Draws	(France) Luka Pavlovic; 6–2, 6–2	(Serbia) Dušan Obradović	(Italy) Giannicola Misasi (Italy) Alessandro Bellifemine	(United Kingdom) Emile Hudd; Erik Arutiunian (France) Quentin Folliot (Hungary) Péter Fajta
August 28	Kuršumlijska Banja, Serbia; Clay; M15; Singles and Doubles Draws	(Bulgaria) Gabriel Donev (Bulgaria) Simon Anthony Ivanov; 6–1, 6–2	(Italy) Giammarco Gandolfi (Italy) Giannicola Misasi	(Italy) Giannicola Misasi (Italy) Alessandro Bellifemine	(United Kingdom) Emile Hudd; Erik Arutiunian (France) Quentin Folliot (Hungary) Péter Fajta
August 28	Bucharest, Romania; Clay; M15; Singles and Doubles Draws	(Romania) Bogdan Pavel; 7–5, 6–4	(Argentina) Juan Pablo Paz	(Bulgaria) Petr Nesterov (Romania) Gabi Adrian Boitan	(France) Amaury Raynel (Romania) Dan Alexandru Tomescu (Romania) Vlad Andrei Dancu (Costa Rica) Jesse Flores
August 28	Bucharest, Romania; Clay; M15; Singles and Doubles Draws	(Romania) Ioan Alexandru Chirița (Argentina) Juan Pablo Paz; 2–6, 6–3, [10–7]	(Romania) Vlad Cristian Breazu (Romania) Gheorghe Claudiu Schinteie	(Bulgaria) Petr Nesterov (Romania) Gabi Adrian Boitan	(France) Amaury Raynel (Romania) Dan Alexandru Tomescu (Romania) Vlad Andrei Dancu (Costa Rica) Jesse Flores
August 28	Buenos Aires, Argentina; Clay; M15; Singles and Doubles Draws	(Brazil) Gilbert Klier Júnior; 6–2, 6–1	(Argentina) Lautaro Midón	(Uruguay) Joaquín Aguilar Cardozo (United States) Bruno Kuzuhara	(Argentina) Matías Franco Descotte (Argentina) Gonzalo Villanueva (Argentina) Francisco Pini (Paraguay) Daniel Vallejo
August 28	Buenos Aires, Argentina; Clay; M15; Singles and Doubles Draws	(Argentina) Mariano Kestelboim (Argentina) Gonzalo Villanueva; 6–1, 6–2	(Brazil) Gilbert Klier Júnior (Brazil) João Victor Couto Loureiro	(Uruguay) Joaquín Aguilar Cardozo (United States) Bruno Kuzuhara	(Argentina) Matías Franco Descotte (Argentina) Gonzalo Villanueva (Argentina) Francisco Pini (Paraguay) Daniel Vallejo
August 28	Vienna, Austria; Clay; M15; Singles and Doubles Draws	(Germany) Peter Heller; 7–6^{(9–7)}, 6–2	(Slovakia) Miloš Karol	(Czech Republic) Dominik Kellovský (Austria) Gerald Melzer	Andrey Chepelev (Croatia) Luka Mikrut (Germany) John Sperle (Czech Republic) Matthew William Donald
August 28	Vienna, Austria; Clay; M15; Singles and Doubles Draws	(Germany) Peter Heller (Czech Republic) Dominik Kellovský; 7–5, 2–6, [10–5]	(Italy) Marco De Rosa (Italy) Alessandro Ragazzi	(Czech Republic) Dominik Kellovský (Austria) Gerald Melzer	Andrey Chepelev (Croatia) Luka Mikrut (Germany) John Sperle (Czech Republic) Matthew William Donald
August 28	Nakhon Si Thammarat, Thailand; Hard; M15; Singles and Doubles Draws	(Thailand) Maximus Jones; 7–6^{(7–3)}, 6–4	(Ukraine) Yurii Dzhavakian	(Thailand) Thanapet Chanta (Australia) Moerani Bouzige	(Japan) Taisei Ichikawa (India) Siddhant Banthia (Australia) Kody Pearson (China) Tang Sheng
August 28	Nakhon Si Thammarat, Thailand; Hard; M15; Singles and Doubles Draws	(India) Ishaque Eqbal (India) Faisal Qamar; 6–4, 6–3	(Japan) Taisei Ichikawa (Japan) Yuta Kawahashi	(Thailand) Thanapet Chanta (Australia) Moerani Bouzige	(Japan) Taisei Ichikawa (India) Siddhant Banthia (Australia) Kody Pearson (China) Tang Sheng
August 28	Monastir, Tunisia; Hard; M15; Singles and Doubles Draws	(France) Alexis Gautier; 6–2, 6–2	(South Africa) Kris van Wyk	(Greece) Alexandros Skorilas; Ilia Simakin	(Moldova) Alexandr Cozbinov (Australia) Matthew Dellavedova (Moldova) Ilya Snițari (France) Louis Tessa
August 28	Monastir, Tunisia; Hard; M15; Singles and Doubles Draws	(United States) Ryan Seggerman (United States) Patrik Trhac; 6–1, 6–3	(India) Chirag Duhan (United States) Garrett Johns	(Greece) Alexandros Skorilas; Ilia Simakin	(Moldova) Alexandr Cozbinov (Australia) Matthew Dellavedova (Moldova) Ilya Snițari (France) Louis Tessa

=== September ===
Week of	Tournament	Winner	Runners-up	Semifinalists	Quarterfinalists
September 4	Bagnères-de-Bigorre, France; Hard; M25+H; Singles and Doubles Draws	(Belgium) Michael Geerts; 6–3, 3–6, 7–6^{(9–7)}	(France) Tristan Lamasine	(Australia) Matthew Dellavedova (Spain) John Echeverría	(France) Adrien Gobat (France) Robin Bertrand (France) Clément Chidekh (France) Paul Cayre
September 4	Bagnères-de-Bigorre, France; Hard; M25+H; Singles and Doubles Draws	(Australia) Patrick Harper (Germany) Mark Wallner; 3–6, 6–3, [10–7]	(France) Robin Bertrand (United Kingdom) Millen Hurrion	(Australia) Matthew Dellavedova (Spain) John Echeverría	(France) Adrien Gobat (France) Robin Bertrand (France) Clément Chidekh (France) Paul Cayre
September 4	Hong Kong, Hong Kong, China; Hard; M25; Singles and Doubles Draws	(Hong Kong) Coleman Wong; 4–6, 7–6^{(10–8)}, [10–4]	Egor Gerasimov	(Morocco) Adam Moundir (United States) Henrik Wiersholm	(Australia) Blake Mott (Indonesia) Muhammad Rifqi Fitriadi (Japan) Ryuki Matsuda (Japan) Kazuki Nishiwaki
September 4	Hong Kong, Hong Kong, China; Hard; M25; Singles and Doubles Draws	(Japan) Ryuki Matsuda (South Korea) Son Ji-hoon; 7–5, 6–4	(Hong Kong) Coleman Wong (Hong Kong) Wong Hong-kit	(Morocco) Adam Moundir (United States) Henrik Wiersholm	(Australia) Blake Mott (Indonesia) Muhammad Rifqi Fitriadi (Japan) Ryuki Matsuda (Japan) Kazuki Nishiwaki
September 4	Sintra, Portugal; Hard; M25; Singles and Doubles Draws	(United Kingdom) Harry Wendelken; 3–6, 6–2, 7–6^{(7–4)}	(Portugal) Jaime Faria	(Germany) Sebastian Fanselow (Portugal) Henrique Rocha	(United States) Trey Hilderbrand (Portugal) Duarte Vale (Portugal) Rodrigo Fernandes (Portugal) João Domingues
September 4	Sintra, Portugal; Hard; M25; Singles and Doubles Draws	(Denmark) Johannes Ingildsen (Sweden) Fred Simonsson; 7–6^{(7–5)}, 3–6, [10–7]	(Portugal) Jaime Faria (Portugal) Henrique Rocha	(Germany) Sebastian Fanselow (Portugal) Henrique Rocha	(United States) Trey Hilderbrand (Portugal) Duarte Vale (Portugal) Rodrigo Fernandes (Portugal) João Domingues
September 4	Maribor, Slovenia; Clay; M25; Singles and Doubles Draws	(Argentina) Juan Bautista Torres; 6–4, 7–5	(Czech Republic) Michael Vrbenský	(United States) Toby Kodat (France) Mathys Erhard	(Slovenia) Bor Artnak (Croatia) Nikola Bašić (Belgium) Buvaysar Gadamauri (Brazil) Nicolas Zanellato
September 4	Maribor, Slovenia; Clay; M25; Singles and Doubles Draws	(Croatia) Luka Mikrut (Croatia) Mili Poljičak; 7–6^{(7–5)}, 6–4	(Croatia) Domagoj Bilješko (Belgium) Buvaysar Gadamauri	(United States) Toby Kodat (France) Mathys Erhard	(Slovenia) Bor Artnak (Croatia) Nikola Bašić (Belgium) Buvaysar Gadamauri (Brazil) Nicolas Zanellato
September 4	Kigali, Rwanda; Clay; M25; Singles and Doubles Draws	(Switzerland) Damien Wenger; 6–4, 6–2	(United States) Oliver Crawford	(Ukraine) Vadym Ursu (Zimbabwe) Benjamin Lock	(India) Rishab Agarwal (France) Corentin Denolly (India) Ishaque Eqbal (India) Atharva Sharma
September 4	Kigali, Rwanda; Clay; M25; Singles and Doubles Draws	(France) Corentin Denolly (Switzerland) Damien Wenger; 4–6, 7–6^{(7–5)}, [10–5]	(Ghana) Abraham Asaba (Burundi) Guy Orly Iradukunda	(Ukraine) Vadym Ursu (Zimbabwe) Benjamin Lock	(India) Rishab Agarwal (France) Corentin Denolly (India) Ishaque Eqbal (India) Atharva Sharma
September 4	Sapporo, Japan; Hard; M25; Singles and Doubles Draws	(Japan) Shuichi Sekiguchi; 6–1, 6–4	(Japan) Daisuke Sumizawa	(Japan) Naoki Nakagawa (Japan) Sora Fukuda	(Japan) Kokoro Isomura (Japan) Jumpei Yamasaki (Japan) Ryotaro Matsumura (Japan) Ko Suzuki
September 4	Sapporo, Japan; Hard; M25; Singles and Doubles Draws	(Japan) Sho Katayama (Japan) Takeru Yuzuki; 6–4, 6–4	(Canada) Chih-Chi Huang (Japan) Yuta Kikuchi	(Japan) Naoki Nakagawa (Japan) Sora Fukuda	(Japan) Kokoro Isomura (Japan) Jumpei Yamasaki (Japan) Ryotaro Matsumura (Japan) Ko Suzuki
September 4	Monastir, Tunisia; Hard; M25; Singles and Doubles Draws	(United States) Ryan Seggerman; 7–5, 6–4	Ilia Simakin	(Jordan) Abdullah Shelbayh (South Africa) Kris van Wyk	(France) Alexandre Aubriot (Australia) Thomas Braithwaite (Moldova) Alexandr Cozbinov; Daniil Ostapenkov
September 4	Monastir, Tunisia; Hard; M25; Singles and Doubles Draws	(United States) Ryan Seggerman (United States) Patrik Trhac; 7–5, 6–4	(Australia) Thomas Braithwaite (Australia) Timothy Gray	(Jordan) Abdullah Shelbayh (South Africa) Kris van Wyk	(France) Alexandre Aubriot (Australia) Thomas Braithwaite (Moldova) Alexandr Cozbinov; Daniil Ostapenkov
September 4	Nakhon Si Thammarat, Thailand; Hard; M15; Singles and Doubles Draws	(Malaysia) Mitsuki Wei Kang Leong; 6–3, 6–2	(Thailand) Pruchya Isaro	(Australia) Moerani Bouzige (Kazakhstan) Grigoriy Lomakin	(India) Sidharth Rawat (New Zealand) James Watt (South Korea) Han Seon-yong (Thailand) Maximus Jones
September 4	Nakhon Si Thammarat, Thailand; Hard; M15; Singles and Doubles Draws	(China) Sun Qian (Thailand) Wishaya Trongcharoenchaikul; 6–4, 6–4	(Kazakhstan) Grigoriy Lomakin (Thailand) Maximus Jones	(Australia) Moerani Bouzige (Kazakhstan) Grigoriy Lomakin	(India) Sidharth Rawat (New Zealand) James Watt (South Korea) Han Seon-yong (Thailand) Maximus Jones
September 4	Pirot, Serbia; Clay; M15; Singles and Doubles Draws	(Romania) Vlad Andrei Dancu; 7–5, 2–6, 6–3	(Romania) Filip Cristian Jianu	(Serbia) Dušan Obradović (Hungary) Péter Fajta	(Serbia) Viktor Jović (Italy) Antonio Massara (France) Luka Pavlovic (Bulgaria) Simon Anthony Ivanov
September 4	Pirot, Serbia; Clay; M15; Singles and Doubles Draws	(Serbia) Viktor Jović (France) Luka Pavlovic; 7–5, 6–2	Alexander Chepik (Italy) Davide Galoppini	(Serbia) Dušan Obradović (Hungary) Péter Fajta	(Serbia) Viktor Jović (Italy) Antonio Massara (France) Luka Pavlovic (Bulgaria) Simon Anthony Ivanov
September 4	Olavarría, Argentina; Clay; M15; Singles and Doubles Draws	(Argentina) Lautaro Midón; 6–4, 6–3	(Argentina) Matías Franco Descotte	(Uruguay) Franco Roncadelli (Argentina) Guido Iván Justo	(Argentina) Matias Zukas (Argentina) Leonardo Monferrer (Argentina) Mariano Kestelboim (Brazil) Gilbert Klier Júnior
September 4	Olavarría, Argentina; Clay; M15; Singles and Doubles Draws	(Argentina) Lorenzo Gagliardo (Uruguay) Franco Roncadelli; 6–7^{(5–7)}, 7–6^{(9–7)}, [10–6]	(Uruguay) Ignacio Carou (Argentina) Mariano Kestelboim	(Uruguay) Franco Roncadelli (Argentina) Guido Iván Justo	(Argentina) Matias Zukas (Argentina) Leonardo Monferrer (Argentina) Mariano Kestelboim (Brazil) Gilbert Klier Júnior
September 4	Madrid, Spain; Clay; M15; Singles and Doubles Draws	(Netherlands) Ryan Nijboer; 6–4, 6–3	(Spain) Pablo Masjuan Ginel	(Spain) Carlos Gimeno Valero (Argentina) Luciano Emanuel Ambrogi	(Egypt) Mohamed Safwat (Spain) Alejandro Manzanera Pertusa (Germany) Nicola Kuhn (Spain) Jorge Martínez Martínez
September 4	Madrid, Spain; Clay; M15; Singles and Doubles Draws	(Netherlands) Michiel de Krom (Netherlands) Ryan Nijboer; 6–2, 6–2	(Egypt) Karim-Mohamed Maamoun (Egypt) Mohamed Safwat	(Spain) Carlos Gimeno Valero (Argentina) Luciano Emanuel Ambrogi	(Egypt) Mohamed Safwat (Spain) Alejandro Manzanera Pertusa (Germany) Nicola Kuhn (Spain) Jorge Martínez Martínez
September 4	Budapest, Hungary; Hard; M15; Singles and Doubles Draws	(Finland) Patrick Kaukovalta; 7–6^{(7–3)}, 6–7^{(5–7)}, 6–3	(Israel) Ofek Shimanov	(Italy) Mariano Tammaro (United States) Tyler Stice	(Italy) Alessandro Pecci (Georgia (country)) Zura Tkemaladze (United Kingdom) Matthew Summers (Brazil) Gabriel Décamps
September 4	Budapest, Hungary; Hard; M15; Singles and Doubles Draws	(Slovakia) Peter Benjamín Privara (Italy) Mariano Tammaro; 3–0, ret.	(Hungary) Gábor Borsos (Hungary) Péter Sallay	(Italy) Mariano Tammaro (United States) Tyler Stice	(Italy) Alessandro Pecci (Georgia (country)) Zura Tkemaladze (United Kingdom) Matthew Summers (Brazil) Gabriel Décamps
September 4	Koszalin, Poland; Clay; M15; Singles and Doubles Draws	(Germany) Lewie Lane; 6–3, 6–3	(Czech Republic) Dominik Kellovský	(Poland) Paweł Ciaś (Poland) Marcel Zieliński	(Czech Republic) Petr Brunclík (Poland) Maciej Rajski (Germany) Patrick Zahraj (Germany) Tom Gentzsch
September 4	Koszalin, Poland; Clay; M15; Singles and Doubles Draws	(Poland) Maciej Rajski (Poland) Yann Wójcik; 6–2, 7–6^{(7–4)}	(Czech Republic) Petr Brunclík (Poland) Przemysław Michocki	(Poland) Paweł Ciaś (Poland) Marcel Zieliński	(Czech Republic) Petr Brunclík (Poland) Maciej Rajski (Germany) Patrick Zahraj (Germany) Tom Gentzsch
September 4	Haren, Netherlands; Clay; M15; Singles and Doubles Draws	(Netherlands) Thiemo de Bakker; 6–3, 6–2	(Netherlands) Sidané Pontjodikromo	(Netherlands) Stijn Pel (Netherlands) Brian Bozemoj	(Germany) Adrian Oetzbach (Netherlands) Sander Jong (Germany) Kai Lemstra (Netherlands) Niels Visker
September 4	Haren, Netherlands; Clay; M15; Singles and Doubles Draws	(Netherlands) Jarno Jans (Netherlands) Niels Visker; 7–5, 6–4	(Netherlands) Jurriaan Bol (Netherlands) Brian Bozemoj	(Netherlands) Stijn Pel (Netherlands) Brian Bozemoj	(Germany) Adrian Oetzbach (Netherlands) Sander Jong (Germany) Kai Lemstra (Netherlands) Niels Visker
September 4	Constanța, Romania; Clay; M15; Singles and Doubles Draws	(Romania) Cezar Crețu; 3–6, 7–5, 6–1	(Argentina) Juan Pablo Paz	(Italy) Pietro Marino (Romania) Dan Alexandru Tomescu	(Argentina) Lorenzo Joaquín Rodríguez (Argentina) Lautaro Agustín Falabella (Romania) Ioan Alexandru Chirița (Italy) Gianmarco Ferrari
September 4	Constanța, Romania; Clay; M15; Singles and Doubles Draws	(Italy) Matteo De Vincentis (Italy) Elio José Ribeiro Lago; 6–4, 6–3	(Romania) Vlad Andrei Dumitru (Romania) Ștefan Paloși	(Italy) Pietro Marino (Romania) Dan Alexandru Tomescu	(Argentina) Lorenzo Joaquín Rodríguez (Argentina) Lautaro Agustín Falabella (Romania) Ioan Alexandru Chirița (Italy) Gianmarco Ferrari
September 4	Monastir, Tunisia; Hard; M15; Singles and Doubles Draws	(France) Fabien Salle; 7–6^{(7–4)}, 6–1	(Dominican Republic) Peter Bertran	(France) Alexis Gautier (France) Cyril Vandermeersch	(Brazil) Karue Sell (Italy) Andrea Guerrieri (Italy) Federico Salomone (Moldova) Ilya Snițari
September 4	Monastir, Tunisia; Hard; M15; Singles and Doubles Draws	(Germany) Niklas Schell (United Kingdom) Oscar Weightman; 6–3, 6–2	(United States) Samir Banerjee (India) Chirag Duhan	(France) Alexis Gautier (France) Cyril Vandermeersch	(Brazil) Karue Sell (Italy) Andrea Guerrieri (Italy) Federico Salomone (Moldova) Ilya Snițari
September 11	Madrid, Spain; Hard; M25; Singles and Doubles Draws	(United Kingdom) Aidan McHugh; 6–4, 7–5	(Germany) Peter Heller	(Spain) Bruno Pujol Navarro (Spain) Miguel Damas	(Spain) Sergi Pérez Contri (United Kingdom) Daniel Cox (Spain) Daniel Mérida (France) Clément Chidekh
September 11	Madrid, Spain; Hard; M25; Singles and Doubles Draws	(Canada) Juan Carlos Aguilar (Antigua and Barbuda) Jody Maginley; 6–4, 6–3	(Spain) Bruno Pujol Navarro (Spain) Jorge Plans	(Spain) Bruno Pujol Navarro (Spain) Miguel Damas	(Spain) Sergi Pérez Contri (United Kingdom) Daniel Cox (Spain) Daniel Mérida (France) Clément Chidekh
September 11	Plaisir, France; Hard (i); M25+H; Singles and Doubles Draws	(Germany) Mats Rosenkranz; 6–3, 6–7^{(3–7)}, 7–6^{(7–3)}	(France) Antoine Hoang	(France) Tristan Lamasine (United Kingdom) Anton Matusevich	(France) Nicolas Colne (United Kingdom) Daniel Little; Evgeny Karlovskiy (France) Antoine Ghibaudo
September 11	Plaisir, France; Hard (i); M25+H; Singles and Doubles Draws	(Australia) Patrick Harper (Germany) Mark Wallner; 6–4, 7–6^{(7–3)}	(United States) Jack Vance (United States) Tennyson Whiting	(France) Tristan Lamasine (United Kingdom) Anton Matusevich	(France) Nicolas Colne (United Kingdom) Daniel Little; Evgeny Karlovskiy (France) Antoine Ghibaudo
September 11	Darwin, Australia; Hard; M25; Singles and Doubles Draws	(Australia) Blake Mott; 6–4, 6–1	(Australia) Blake Ellis	(Australia) Moerani Bouzige (Australia) Jeremy Beale	(Australia) Jacob Bradshaw (Australia) Jake Delaney (Australia) Brandon Walkin (United States) Jacob Brumm
September 11	Darwin, Australia; Hard; M25; Singles and Doubles Draws	(Australia) Jeremy Beale (Australia) Thomas Fancutt; 6–4, 6–4	(Australia) Joshua Charlton (Australia) Blake Ellis	(Australia) Moerani Bouzige (Australia) Jeremy Beale	(Australia) Jacob Bradshaw (Australia) Jake Delaney (Australia) Brandon Walkin (United States) Jacob Brumm
September 11	Pozzuoli, Italy; Hard; M25; Singles and Doubles Draws	(Italy) Francesco Forti; 6–4, 6–3	(United Kingdom) Arthur Fery	(Switzerland) Rémy Bertola (Italy) Giovanni Oradini	(Italy) Leonardo Rossi (Italy) Alessandro Pecci (Italy) Niccolò Catini (Italy) Andrea Bacaloni
September 11	Pozzuoli, Italy; Hard; M25; Singles and Doubles Draws	(Italy) Francesco Forti (Italy) Giorgio Ricca; 6–2, 6–3	(Italy) Fabio De Michele (Italy) Gabriele Vulpitta	(Switzerland) Rémy Bertola (Italy) Giovanni Oradini	(Italy) Leonardo Rossi (Italy) Alessandro Pecci (Italy) Niccolò Catini (Italy) Andrea Bacaloni
September 11	Kigali, Rwanda; Clay; M25; Singles and Doubles Draws	(France) Corentin Denolly; 1–6, 6–4, 6–4	(United States) Oliver Crawford	(Burundi) Guy Orly Iradukunda (Switzerland) Damien Wenger	(Ukraine) Vadym Ursu (Ukraine) Eric Vanshelboim (India) S D Prajwal Dev (India) Ishaque Eqbal
September 11	Kigali, Rwanda; Clay; M25; Singles and Doubles Draws	(United States) Nicholas Bybel (Ukraine) Eric Vanshelboim; 6–7^{(5–7)}, 7–6^{(9–7)}, [10–7]	(India) S D Prajwal Dev (India) Ishaque Eqbal	(Burundi) Guy Orly Iradukunda (Switzerland) Damien Wenger	(Ukraine) Vadym Ursu (Ukraine) Eric Vanshelboim (India) S D Prajwal Dev (India) Ishaque Eqbal
September 11	Sapporo, Japan; Hard; M25; Singles and Doubles Draws	(Japan) Naoki Nakagawa; 4–6, 6–1, 6–4	(Japan) Kazuki Nishiwaki	(Japan) Hayato Matsuoka (Japan) Shuichi Sekiguch	(Japan) Koki Matsuda (Japan) Yuta Kawahashi (Japan) Hikaru Shiraishi (Japan) Yuki Mochizuki
September 11	Sapporo, Japan; Hard; M25; Singles and Doubles Draws	(Japan) Kosuke Ogura (Japan) Shunsuke Nakagawa; 7–5, 4–6, [16–14]	(Japan) Yuhei Kono (Japan) Yusuke Kusuhara	(Japan) Hayato Matsuoka (Japan) Shuichi Sekiguch	(Japan) Koki Matsuda (Japan) Yuta Kawahashi (Japan) Hikaru Shiraishi (Japan) Yuki Mochizuki
September 11	Sintra, Portugal; Hard; M25; Singles and Doubles Draws	(Portugal) Henrique Rocha; 6–2, 6–3	(Germany) Sebastian Fanselow	(Portugal) Gonçalo Oliveira (United States) Martin Damm	(Portugal) Tiago Pereira (Portugal) Jaime Faria (Portugal) Pedro Araújo (Portugal) Duarte Vale
September 11	Sintra, Portugal; Hard; M25; Singles and Doubles Draws	(United States) Dali Blanch (United States) Martin Damm; 6–1, 6–2	(Portugal) Jaime Faria (Portugal) Henrique Rocha	(Portugal) Gonçalo Oliveira (United States) Martin Damm	(Portugal) Tiago Pereira (Portugal) Jaime Faria (Portugal) Pedro Araújo (Portugal) Duarte Vale
September 11	Monastir, Tunisia; Hard; M25; Singles and Doubles Draws	(France) Robin Bertrand; 6–2, 2–6, 6–4	(France) Ugo Blanchet	Daniil Ostapenkov (South Africa) Kris van Wyk	(Dominican Republic) Nick Hardt; Daniel Khazime (United States) Marcus McDaniel (United States) Andres Martin
September 11	Monastir, Tunisia; Hard; M25; Singles and Doubles Draws	Daniil Ostapenkov (South Africa) Kris van Wyk; Walkover	(Italy) Stefano Reitano (Dominican Republic) Nick Hardt	Daniil Ostapenkov (South Africa) Kris van Wyk	(Dominican Republic) Nick Hardt; Daniel Khazime (United States) Marcus McDaniel (United States) Andres Martin
September 11	Buschhausen, Germany; Clay; M15; Singles and Doubles Draws	(Czech Republic) Jonáš Forejtek; 6–3, 6–4	(Germany) Louis Wessels	(Czech Republic) Martin Krumich (Italy) Luca Castagnola	(Germany) Adrian Oetzbach (Netherlands) Thiemo de Bakker (Germany) Marc Majdandzic (Syria) Hazem Naw
September 11	Buschhausen, Germany; Clay; M15; Singles and Doubles Draws	(Germany) Adrian Oetzbach (Germany) Jakob Schnaitter; 7–5, 6–4	(Germany) Justin Engel (Germany) Yannik Kelm	(Czech Republic) Martin Krumich (Italy) Luca Castagnola	(Germany) Adrian Oetzbach (Netherlands) Thiemo de Bakker (Germany) Marc Majdandzic (Syria) Hazem Naw
September 11	Kuršumlijska Banja, Serbia; Clay; M15; Singles and Doubles Draws	(Serbia) Dušan Obradović; 6–2, 6–3	Svyatoslav Gulin	(France) Luka Pavlovic (Italy) Francesco Ferrari	(Bosnia and Herzegovina) Aldin Šetkić (Serbia) Stefan Popović (Italy) Gabriele Pennaforti (Romania) Vlad Andrei Dancu
September 11	Kuršumlijska Banja, Serbia; Clay; M15; Singles and Doubles Draws	Andrey Chepelev; Svyatoslav Gulin; 6–4, 6–4	(Serbia) Dušan Obradović (France) Nathan Seateun	(France) Luka Pavlovic (Italy) Francesco Ferrari	(Bosnia and Herzegovina) Aldin Šetkić (Serbia) Stefan Popović (Italy) Gabriele Pennaforti (Romania) Vlad Andrei Dancu
September 11	Champaign, United States; Hard; M15; Singles and Doubles Draws	(Canada) Liam Draxl; 6–1, 6–3	(United States) William Grant	(Japan) Shunsuke Mitsui (United States) Ezekiel Clark	(United States) Patrick Maloney (New Zealand) Jack Loutit (United States) Hunter Heck (United States) Alexander Petrov
September 11	Champaign, United States; Hard; M15; Singles and Doubles Draws	(United States) Axel Nefve (United States) William Grant; 6–2, 5–7, [10–5]	(United States) Ezekiel Clark (Japan) Kenta Miyoshi	(Japan) Shunsuke Mitsui (United States) Ezekiel Clark	(United States) Patrick Maloney (New Zealand) Jack Loutit (United States) Hunter Heck (United States) Alexander Petrov
September 11	Satu Mare, Romania; Clay; M15; Singles and Doubles Draws	(Italy) Giuseppe La Vela; 7–5, 7–5	(Italy) Elio José Ribeiro Lago	(Romania) Ștefan Paloși (Romania) Mihai Răzvan Marinescu	(Germany) Maik Steiner (Romania) Ioan Alexandru Chirița (Italy) Pietro Marino (Romania) Călin Manda
September 11	Satu Mare, Romania; Clay; M15; Singles and Doubles Draws	(Romania) Mihai Răzvan Marinescu (Romania) Călin Manda; 6–4, 7–6^{(7–5)}	(Romania) Ioan Alexandru Chirița (Italy) Juan Cruz Martin Manzano	(Romania) Ștefan Paloși (Romania) Mihai Răzvan Marinescu	(Germany) Maik Steiner (Romania) Ioan Alexandru Chirița (Italy) Pietro Marino (Romania) Călin Manda
September 11	Monastir, Tunisia; Hard; M15; Singles and Doubles Draws	(Germany) Luca Wiedenmann; 7–6^{(7–3)}, 2–1, ret.	(Italy) Massimo Giunta	(Italy) Luca Fantini (France) Louis Tessa	(France) Alexis Gautier (Germany) Max Wiskandt (United Kingdom) Oscar Weightman (Belgium) Jack Loge
September 11	Monastir, Tunisia; Hard; M15; Singles and Doubles Draws	(Germany) Niklas Schell (United Kingdom) Oscar Weightman; 7–5, 6–2	(Turkey) Cengiz Aksu (India) Chirag Duhan	(Italy) Luca Fantini (France) Louis Tessa	(France) Alexis Gautier (Germany) Max Wiskandt (United Kingdom) Oscar Weightman (Belgium) Jack Loge
September 18	Setúbal, Portugal; Hard; M25; Singles and Doubles Draws	(United States) Martin Damm; 7–6^{(7–5)}, 3–6, 6–3	(United States) Dali Blanch	(United Kingdom) Aidan McHugh (Portugal) Jaime Faria	(Germany) Sebastian Fanselow (Portugal) Henrique Rocha (North Macedonia) Kalin Ivanovski (Estonia) Daniil Glinka
September 18	Setúbal, Portugal; Hard; M25; Singles and Doubles Draws	(Portugal) Jaime Faria (Portugal) Henrique Rocha; 6–3, 6–3	(Portugal) Fred Gil (Portugal) Diogo Marques	(United Kingdom) Aidan McHugh (Portugal) Jaime Faria	(Germany) Sebastian Fanselow (Portugal) Henrique Rocha (North Macedonia) Kalin Ivanovski (Estonia) Daniil Glinka
September 18	Darwin, Australia; Hard; M25; Singles and Doubles Draws	(Australia) Blake Mott; 6–2, 2–6, 6–3	(Australia) Jake Delaney	(Australia) Kody Pearson (Australia) Jayden Court	(United States) Henrik Wiersholm (New Zealand) Ajeet Rai (Australia) Scott Jones (Australia) Luke Sorensen
September 18	Darwin, Australia; Hard; M25; Singles and Doubles Draws	(Australia) Thomas Fancutt (New Zealand) Ajeet Rai; 6–1, 6–4	(Australia) Blake Bayldon (Australia) Brandon Walkin	(Australia) Kody Pearson (Australia) Jayden Court	(United States) Henrik Wiersholm (New Zealand) Ajeet Rai (Australia) Scott Jones (Australia) Luke Sorensen
September 18	Takasaki, Japan; Hard; M25; Singles and Doubles Draws	(Japan) Naoki Nakagawa; 6–2, 7–6^{(7–5)}	(Japan) Makoto Ochi	(Japan) Sora Fukuda (United States) Collin Altamirano	(Japan) Hikaru Shiraishi (Japan) Tatsuma Ito (United States) Gage Brymer (Japan) Kazuki Nishiwaki
September 18	Takasaki, Japan; Hard; M25; Singles and Doubles Draws	(Japan) Seita Watanabe (Japan) Takeru Yuzuki; 6–4, 2–6, [10–5]	(Japan) Taisei Ichikawa (Japan) Kazuma Kawachi	(Japan) Sora Fukuda (United States) Collin Altamirano	(Japan) Hikaru Shiraishi (Japan) Tatsuma Ito (United States) Gage Brymer (Japan) Kazuki Nishiwaki
September 18	Santa Margherita di Pula, Italy; Clay; M25; Singles and Doubles Draws	(Poland) Daniel Michalski; 2–6, 6–4, 6–2	(Italy) Federico Arnaboldi	(Italy) Gabriele Piraino (Italy) Giovanni Oradini	(Italy) Antonio Caruso (Italy) Giuseppe La Vela (Italy) Niccolò Catini (Spain) Carlos López Montagud
September 18	Santa Margherita di Pula, Italy; Clay; M25; Singles and Doubles Draws	(Netherlands) Sander Jong (Netherlands) Jesse Timmermans; 6–2, 3–6, [10–6]	(Netherlands) Dax Donders (Netherlands) Sidané Pontjodikromo	(Italy) Gabriele Piraino (Italy) Giovanni Oradini	(Italy) Antonio Caruso (Italy) Giuseppe La Vela (Italy) Niccolò Catini (Spain) Carlos López Montagud
September 18	Sharm El Sheikh, Egypt; Hard; M25; Singles and Doubles Draws	(Lebanon) Hady Habib; 6–4, 6–4	(South Africa) Kris van Wyk	(Georgia (country)) Zura Tkemaladze (Turkey) Tuncay Duran	(Israel) Yshai Oliel (Turkey) Yankı Erel (Italy) Leonardo Rossi (Turkey) Berk İlkel
September 18	Sharm El Sheikh, Egypt; Hard; M25; Singles and Doubles Draws	(Antigua and Barbuda) Jody Maginley (United States) Joshua Sheehy; 6–3, 7–6^{(8–6)}	(United Kingdom) Adam Jones (United Kingdom) David Quayle	(Georgia (country)) Zura Tkemaladze (Turkey) Tuncay Duran	(Israel) Yshai Oliel (Turkey) Yankı Erel (Italy) Leonardo Rossi (Turkey) Berk İlkel
September 18	Guiyang, China; Hard; M25; Singles and Doubles Draws	(China) Bai Yan; 6–2, 6–2	(Germany) Jimmy Yang	(Chinese Taipei) Yin Bang-shuo (China) Zhao Zhao	(China) Yu Zongbing (China) Wang Qiulin (China) Zhang Linghao (Chinese Taipei) Meng Cing-yang
September 18	Guiyang, China; Hard; M25; Singles and Doubles Draws	(China) Liu Shaoyun (China) Zheng Zhan; 3–6, 6–3, [10–7]	(China) Dong Zhenxiong (China) Zhang Changli	(Chinese Taipei) Yin Bang-shuo (China) Zhao Zhao	(China) Yu Zongbing (China) Wang Qiulin (China) Zhang Linghao (Chinese Taipei) Meng Cing-yang
September 18	Pardubice, Czech Republic; Clay; M25; Singles and Doubles Draws	(Germany) Louis Wessels; 6–4, 4–6, 6-3	(Czech Republic) Jonáš Forejtek	(Ukraine) Eric Vanshelboim (Czech Republic) Martin Krumich	(Czech Republic) Jakub Nicod (Czech Republic) Jiří Barnat (Croatia) Matej Dodig (Ukraine) Oleg Prihodko
September 18	Pardubice, Czech Republic; Clay; M25; Singles and Doubles Draws	(Czech Republic) Dominik Reček (Czech Republic) Daniel Siniakov; 7–6^{(7–0)}, 6–4	(Czech Republic) Jiří Barnat (Czech Republic) Filip Duda	(Ukraine) Eric Vanshelboim (Czech Republic) Martin Krumich	(Czech Republic) Jakub Nicod (Czech Republic) Jiří Barnat (Croatia) Matej Dodig (Ukraine) Oleg Prihodko
September 18	Punta del Este, Uruguay; Clay; M15; Singles and Doubles Draws	(United States) Bruno Kuzuhara; 6–7^{(3–7)}, 6–1, 6–3	(Ecuador) Álvaro Guillén Meza	(Uruguay) Franco Roncadelli (Argentina) Mariano Kestelboim	(Argentina) Bautista Vilicich (Brazil) Mateo Barreiros Reyes (Argentina) Manuel Mouilleron Salvo (Argentina) Matías Franco Descotte
September 18	Punta del Este, Uruguay; Clay; M15; Singles and Doubles Draws	(Uruguay) Ignacio Carou (Argentina) Fermín Tenti; 7–6^{(7–4)}, 6–4	(Brazil) Luís Britto (Brazil) João Eduardo Schiessl	(Uruguay) Franco Roncadelli (Argentina) Mariano Kestelboim	(Argentina) Bautista Vilicich (Brazil) Mateo Barreiros Reyes (Argentina) Manuel Mouilleron Salvo (Argentina) Matías Franco Descotte
September 18	Melilla, Spain; Clay; M15; Singles and Doubles Draws	(Spain) Alejo Sánchez Quílez; 4–6, 6–0, 6–1	(Spain) Max Alcalá Gurri	(United Kingdom) Felix Gill (France) Maxime Mora	(Switzerland) Noah Lopez (Spain) Diego Augusto Barreto Sánchez (Spain) Benjamín Winter López (Spain) Jorge Martínez Martínez
September 18	Melilla, Spain; Clay; M15; Singles and Doubles Draws	(Spain) Jorge Martínez Martínez (Spain) Benjamín Winter López; 6–1, 6–4	(Bulgaria) Anthony Genov (Switzerland) Noah Lopez	(United Kingdom) Felix Gill (France) Maxime Mora	(Switzerland) Noah Lopez (Spain) Diego Augusto Barreto Sánchez (Spain) Benjamín Winter López (Spain) Jorge Martínez Martínez
September 18	Kuršumlijska Banja, Serbia; Clay; M15; Singles and Doubles Draws	(France) Luka Pavlovic; 7–5, 3–1, ret.	(Bosnia and Herzegovina) Andrej Nedić	(Bulgaria) Yanaki Milev (Serbia) Stefan Popović	Andrey Chepelev (Bulgaria) Petr Nesterov (Bosnia and Herzegovina) Aldin Šetkić; Svyatoslav Gulin
September 18	Kuršumlijska Banja, Serbia; Clay; M15; Singles and Doubles Draws	Andrey Chepelev; Svyatoslav Gulin; 6–4, 3–6, [10–6]	(Serbia) Aleksa Pisarić (Serbia) Vuk Rađenović	(Bulgaria) Yanaki Milev (Serbia) Stefan Popović	Andrey Chepelev (Bulgaria) Petr Nesterov (Bosnia and Herzegovina) Aldin Šetkić; Svyatoslav Gulin
September 18	Danderyd, Sweden; Hard (i); M15; Singles and Doubles Draws	(United Kingdom) Giles Hussey; 6–2, 6–3	(Germany) Mats Rosenkranz	(Sweden) Karl Friberg (United Kingdom) Harry Wendelken	(United Kingdom) Hamish Stewart (Germany) Jakob Schnaitter (Germany) Adrian Oetzbach (Belgium) Tibo Colson
September 18	Danderyd, Sweden; Hard (i); M15; Singles and Doubles Draws	(Germany) Adrian Oetzbach (Germany) Mats Rosenkranz; 6–0, 6–3	(Netherlands) Daniel de Jonge (Germany) Jakob Schnaitter	(Sweden) Karl Friberg (United Kingdom) Harry Wendelken	(United Kingdom) Hamish Stewart (Germany) Jakob Schnaitter (Germany) Adrian Oetzbach (Belgium) Tibo Colson
September 18	Monastir, Tunisia; Hard; M15; Singles and Doubles Draws	(United States) Andres Martin; 6–2, 6–4	(France) Constantin Bittoun Kouzmine	(South Africa) Devin Badenhorst (United States) Keshav Chopra	(France) Pierre Delage (Italy) Stefano Reitano (Australia) Thomas Braithwaite (Dominican Republic) Roberto Cid Subervi
September 18	Monastir, Tunisia; Hard; M15; Singles and Doubles Draws	(United States) Keshav Chopra (United States) Andres Martin; 6–1, 6–4	(Australia) Thomas Braithwaite (Germany) Max Wiskandt	(South Africa) Devin Badenhorst (United States) Keshav Chopra	(France) Pierre Delage (Italy) Stefano Reitano (Australia) Thomas Braithwaite (Dominican Republic) Roberto Cid Subervi
September 25	Sabadell, Spain; Clay; M25; Singles and Doubles Draws	(Lithuania) Vilius Gaubas; 6–4, 6–4	(United Kingdom) Felix Gill	(Spain) Jorge Martínez Martínez (Spain) Álvaro López San Martín	(France) Mathys Erhard (Denmark) Kane Bonsach Ganley (Netherlands) Michiel de Krom (Netherlands) Ryan Nijboer
September 25	Sabadell, Spain; Clay; M25; Singles and Doubles Draws	(Spain) Jorge Martínez Martínez (Spain) Benjamín Winter López; 7–5, 6–3	(Spain) Álvaro López San Martín (Spain) Bruno Pujol Navarro	(Spain) Jorge Martínez Martínez (Spain) Álvaro López San Martín	(France) Mathys Erhard (Denmark) Kane Bonsach Ganley (Netherlands) Michiel de Krom (Netherlands) Ryan Nijboer
September 25	Santa Margherita di Pula, Italy; Clay; M25; Singles and Doubles Draws	(Belgium) Gilles-Arnaud Bailly; 6–1, 6–2	(Italy) Enrico Dalla Valle	(Italy) Federico Bondioli; Kirill Kivattsev	(Italy) Luca Potenza (Italy) Federico Iannaccone (Italy) Fabrizio Andaloro (Italy) Tommaso Compagnucci
September 25	Santa Margherita di Pula, Italy; Clay; M25; Singles and Doubles Draws	(Italy) Andrea Picchione (Italy) Marcello Serafini; 6–1, 6–7^{(4–7)}, [12–10]	(Italy) Niccolò Catini (Italy) Luca Potenza	(Italy) Federico Bondioli; Kirill Kivattsev	(Italy) Luca Potenza (Italy) Federico Iannaccone (Italy) Fabrizio Andaloro (Italy) Tommaso Compagnucci
September 25	Pazardzhik, Bulgaria; Clay; M25; Singles and Doubles Draws	(France) Clément Tabur; 6–2, 3–6, 6–2	(Bulgaria) Yanaki Milev	Andrey Chepelev (Netherlands) Max Houkes	(Romania) Nicholas David Ionel (Bulgaria) Nikola Kolyachev (Czech Republic) Hynek Bartoň (Austria) Sandro Kopp
September 25	Pazardzhik, Bulgaria; Clay; M25; Singles and Doubles Draws	(Austria) Sandro Kopp (Austria) Neil Oberleitner; 6–0, 6–0	(Netherlands) Max Houkes (Ukraine) Eric Vanshelboim	Andrey Chepelev (Netherlands) Max Houkes	(Romania) Nicholas David Ionel (Bulgaria) Nikola Kolyachev (Czech Republic) Hynek Bartoň (Austria) Sandro Kopp
September 25	Zlatibor, Serbia; Clay; M25; Singles and Doubles Draws	(Czech Republic) Andrew Paulson; 6–3, 5–7, 6–3	(Monaco) Valentin Vacherot	(Germany) Marko Topo (Romania) Sebastian Gima	(Serbia) Viktor Jović (Ukraine) Vladyslav Orlov (Croatia) Matej Dodig (Austria) David Pichler
September 25	Zlatibor, Serbia; Clay; M25; Singles and Doubles Draws	(France) Corentin Denolly (Switzerland) Damien Wenger; 6–1, 4–6, [10–5]	(Serbia) Viktor Jović (France) Luka Pavlovic	(Germany) Marko Topo (Romania) Sebastian Gima	(Serbia) Viktor Jović (Ukraine) Vladyslav Orlov (Croatia) Matej Dodig (Austria) David Pichler
September 25	Falun, Sweden; Hard (i); M25; Singles and Doubles Draws	(Belgium) Tibo Colson; 7–5, 4–6, 6–3	(Belgium) Alexander Blockx	Evgeny Karlovskiy (Sweden) Karl Friberg	(Sweden) Leo Borg (Sweden) Max Dahlin (Lithuania) Edas Butvilas (United Kingdom) Anton Matusevich
September 25	Falun, Sweden; Hard (i); M25; Singles and Doubles Draws	(Sweden) Simon Freund (Denmark) Johannes Ingildsen; 7–6^{(7–2)}, 4–6, [10–7]	(United Kingdom) Anton Matusevich (United Kingdom) Harry Wendelken	Evgeny Karlovskiy (Sweden) Karl Friberg	(Sweden) Leo Borg (Sweden) Max Dahlin (Lithuania) Edas Butvilas (United Kingdom) Anton Matusevich
September 25	Luján, Argentina; Clay; M25; Singles and Doubles Draws	(Ecuador) Álvaro Guillén Meza; 3–6, 6–3, 7–6^{(7–3)}	(Argentina) Luciano Emanuel Ambrogi	(Argentina) Mariano Kestelboim (Peru) Gonzalo Bueno	(Bolivia) Juan Carlos Prado Ángelo (Argentina) Valerio Aboian (Argentina) Lautaro Midón (Brazil) Mateo Barreiros Reyes
September 25	Luján, Argentina; Clay; M25; Singles and Doubles Draws	(Brazil) Luís Britto (Brazil) João Eduardo Schiessl; 6–2, 6–3	(Argentina) Fermín Tenti (Argentina) Gonzalo Villanueva	(Argentina) Mariano Kestelboim (Peru) Gonzalo Bueno	(Bolivia) Juan Carlos Prado Ángelo (Argentina) Valerio Aboian (Argentina) Lautaro Midón (Brazil) Mateo Barreiros Reyes
September 25	Forbach, France; Carpet (i); M15; Singles and Doubles Draws	(Estonia) Daniil Glinka; 6–4, 6–4	(United Kingdom) Hamish Stewart	(Germany) Tom Gentzsch (France) Arthur Bouquier	(Ukraine) Volodymyr Iakubenko (Morocco) Adam Moundir (Syria) Hazem Naw (France) Axel Garcian
September 25	Forbach, France; Carpet (i); M15; Singles and Doubles Draws	(United Kingdom) Millen Hurrion (New Zealand) Finn Reynolds; 6–4, 3–6, [10–7]	(Switzerland) Louroi Martinez (Morocco) Adam Moundir	(Germany) Tom Gentzsch (France) Arthur Bouquier	(Ukraine) Volodymyr Iakubenko (Morocco) Adam Moundir (Syria) Hazem Naw (France) Axel Garcian
September 25	Arad, Romania; Clay; M15; Singles and Doubles Draws	(Czech Republic) Jakub Nicod; 6–4, 6–7^{(8–10)}, 6–4	(Romania) Vlad Andrei Dancu	(Czech Republic) Matthew William Donald (Argentina) Juan Pablo Paz	(Romania) Bogdan Pavel (Romania) Dan Alexandru Tomescu; Denis Klok (Germany) Kai Wehnelt
September 25	Arad, Romania; Clay; M15; Singles and Doubles Draws	Denis Klok (Romania) Dan Alexandru Tomescu; 6–4, 3–6, [10–6]	(Czech Republic) Matthew William Donald (Czech Republic) Jakub Nicod	(Czech Republic) Matthew William Donald (Argentina) Juan Pablo Paz	(Romania) Bogdan Pavel (Romania) Dan Alexandru Tomescu; Denis Klok (Germany) Kai Wehnelt
September 25	Albuquerque, United States; Hard; M15; Singles and Doubles Draws	(Canada) Liam Draxl; 6–0, 6–2	(United States) William Grant	(France) Jaimee Floyd Angele (United States) Keegan Smith	(Turkey) Arda Azkara (Ecuador) Andrés Andrade (United States) Colin Markes (Sweden) Olle Wallin
September 25	Albuquerque, United States; Hard; M15; Singles and Doubles Draws	(United States) Colin Markes (United States) Keegan Smith; 7–5, 6–4	(United States) Andrew Fenty (United States) Axel Nefve	(France) Jaimee Floyd Angele (United States) Keegan Smith	(Turkey) Arda Azkara (Ecuador) Andrés Andrade (United States) Colin Markes (Sweden) Olle Wallin
September 25	Sharm El Sheikh, Egypt; Hard; M15; Singles and Doubles Draws	(Egypt) Mohamed Safwat; 6–2, 3–6, 6–3	(United Kingdom) Stuart Parker	(Cyprus) Stylianos Christodoulou (Ukraine) Yurii Dzhavakian	(India) Mukund Sasikumar (Turkey) Tuncay Duran (Egypt) Amr Elsayed (Italy) Iacopo Sada
September 25	Sharm El Sheikh, Egypt; Hard; M15; Singles and Doubles Draws	(China) Zhao Zhao (China) Zheng Baoluo; 6–4, 6–7^{(1–7)}, [10–7]	(Antigua and Barbuda) Jody Maginley (United States) Joshua Sheehy	(Cyprus) Stylianos Christodoulou (Ukraine) Yurii Dzhavakian	(India) Mukund Sasikumar (Turkey) Tuncay Duran (Egypt) Amr Elsayed (Italy) Iacopo Sada
September 25	Monastir, Tunisia; Hard; M15; Singles and Doubles Draws	(Dominican Republic) Roberto Cid Subervi; 6–1, 6–3	(Slovakia) Peter Benjamín Privara	(France) Constantin Bittoun Kouzmine (Australia) Matthew Dellavedova	Alexey Nesterov (France) Jean-Christian Morandais (Australia) Thomas Braithwaite; Aleksandr Lobanov
September 25	Monastir, Tunisia; Hard; M15; Singles and Doubles Draws	Aleksandr Lobanov; Alexey Nesterov; Walkover	(Australia) Thomas Braithwaite (Germany) Max Wiskandt	(France) Constantin Bittoun Kouzmine (Australia) Matthew Dellavedova	Alexey Nesterov (France) Jean-Christian Morandais (Australia) Thomas Braithwaite; Aleksandr Lobanov
