= Jesse Timmermans =

Dutch tennis player

- Country (sports): Netherlands
- Born: 17 March 1989 (age 37) Vlijmen, Netherlands
- Prize money: $9,655

Singles
- Career record: 0–0 (at ATP Tour level, Grand Slam level, and in Davis Cup)
- Career titles: 0
- Highest ranking: No. 1295 (27 November 2017)

Doubles
- Career record: 0–1 (at ATP Tour level, Grand Slam level, and in Davis Cup)
- Career titles: 0
- Highest ranking: No. 546 (13 November 2023)
- Current ranking: No. 547 (20 November 2023)
- Last updated on: 20 November 2023.

Jesse Timmermans (born 17 March 1989) is a Dutch tennis player.

Timmermans has a career high ATP singles ranking of 1295 achieved on 27 November 2017. He also has a career high ATP doubles ranking of 546 achieved on 13 November 2023.

Timmermans made his ATP main draw debut at the 2018 ABN AMRO World Tennis Tournament in the doubles draw partnering Jasper Smit.

== ATP Challenger and ITF Futures/World Tennis Tour finals ==
=== Doubles: 6 (4-2) ===
Legend (doubles) ATP Challenger Tour (0–0) ITF Futures/World Tennis Tour (4–2)	Titles by surface Hard (0–0) Clay (4–2) Grass (0–0) Carpet (0–0)

Result	W–L	Date	Tournament	Tier	Surface	Partner	Opponents	Score
Loss	0–1	Jun 2017	Netherlands F2, Breda	Futures	Clay	(Netherlands) Tim van Terheijden	(Netherlands) Botic van de Zandschulp (Netherlands) Boy Westerhof	1–6, 5–7
Win	1–0	Jul 2023	M15 Metzingen, Germany	World Tennis Tour	Clay	(Netherlands) Sander Jong	(Germany) Philip Florig (Germany) Yannik Kelm	7–5, 4–6, [10–8]
Loss	1–1	Aug 2023	M25 Poznań, Poland	World Tennis Tour	Clay	(Netherlands) Sander Jong	(Poland) Piotr Matuszewski (Germany) Kai Wehnelt	6–3, 6–7^{(7–3)}, [4–10]
Win	2–1	Aug 2023	M25 Oldenzaal, Netherlands	World Tennis Tour	Clay	(Netherlands) Sander Jong	(Netherlands) Brian Bozemoj (Netherlands) Stijn Pel	4–6, 6–4, [10–2]
Win	3–1	Sep 2023	M25 Santa Margherita di Pula, Italy	World Tennis Tour	Clay	(Netherlands) Sander Jong	(Netherlands) Dax Donders (Netherlands) Sidané Pontjodikromo	6–2, 3–6, [10–6]
Win	4–1	Oct 2023	M15 Vigo, Spain	World Tennis Tour	Clay	(Netherlands) Sander Jong	Kirill Mishkin; Vitali Shvets	7–5, 7–6^{(7–2)}
