= Philip Florig =

German tennis player

- Country (sports): Germany
- Born: 11 September 2003 (age 22) Aschaffenburg, Germany
- Height: 1.78 m (5 ft 10 in)
- Plays: Right-handed (two-handed backhand)
- Coach: Benjamin Benedikter
- Prize money: $19,207

Singles
- Career record: 0–0 (at ATP Tour level, Grand Slam level, and in Davis Cup)
- Career titles: 0
- Highest ranking: No. 842 (7 November 2022)
- Current ranking: No. 914 (21 August 2023)

Doubles
- Career record: 0–1 (at ATP Tour level, Grand Slam level, and in Davis Cup)
- Career titles: 0
- Highest ranking: No. 882 (19 June 2023)
- Current ranking: No. 1103 (21 August 2023)
- Last updated on: 21 August 2023.

Philip Florig (born 11 September 2003) is a German tennis player.

Florig has a career high ATP singles ranking of world No. 842 achieved in November 2022, and a career high ATP doubles ranking of No. 882, achieved in June 2023.

Florig made his ATP main draw debut at the 2022 BMW Open after entering the doubles main draw as alternates with Maximilian Homberg, losing in the first round to Roman Jebavý and Andrés Molteni.

Florig is based out of the national sports center in Oberhaching, Germany.

== ATP Challenger and ITF World Tennis Tour finals ==
=== Doubles: 1 (0–1) ===
ATP Challenger (0–0)
ITF World Tennis Tour (0–1)

| Result | W–L | Date | Tournament | Tier | Surface | Partner | Opponents | Score |
|---|---|---|---|---|---|---|---|---|
| Loss | 0–1 | Jul 2023 | M15 Metzingen, Germany | World Tour | Clay | (Germany) Yannik Kelm | (Netherlands) Sander Jong (Netherlands) Jesse Timmermans | 5–7, 6–4, [8–10] |
