= 2017 BMW Open – Doubles =

Doubles
- 2017 BMW Open

Final
- Champions: (Colombia) Juan Sebastián Cabal (Colombia) Robert Farah
- Runners-up: (France) Jérémy Chardy (France) Fabrice Martin
- Score: 6–3, 6–3

Events
| Singles | Doubles |
| ← 2016 · | BMW Open | · 2018 → |

Henri Kontinen and John Peers were the defending champions, but chose not to participate this year.

Juan Sebastián Cabal and Robert Farah won the title, defeating Jérémy Chardy and Fabrice Martin in the final, 6–3, 6–3.

== Seeds ==
1. (Austria) Oliver Marach / (Croatia) Mate Pavić (quarterfinals)
2. (Philippines) Treat Huey / (Belarus) Max Mirnyi (first round)
3. (Colombia) Juan Sebastián Cabal / (Colombia) Robert Farah (champions)
4. (Chile) Julio Peralta / (Argentina) Horacio Zeballos (semifinals)

== Draw ==
=== Key ===
- Q = Qualifier
- WC = Wild card
- LL = Lucky loser
- Alt = Alternate
- ITF = ITF entry
- PR = Protected ranking
- SR = Special ranking
- SE = Special exempt
- JE = Junior exempt
- JR = Junior Accelerator Programme entrant
- CO = College Accelerator Programme entrant
- NG = Next Gen Accelerator Program entrant
- w/o = Walkover
- r = Retired
- d = Defaulted

=== Draw ===
First round
1 | (Austria) O Marach (Croatia) M Pavić | 6 | 6
(Croatia) D Marcan (Austria) T-S Weissborn | 3 | 2
(United States) B Baker (Croatia) N Mektić | 7 | 4 | [10]
(Austria) J Knowle (Austria) A Peya | 5 | 6 | [5]
3 | (Colombia) JS Cabal (Colombia) R Farah | 7 | 7^{7}
(Germany) D Brown (Germany) J-L Struff | 5 | 6^{5}
(Italy) F Fognini (Italy) A Seppi | 6 | 6
WC | (Germany) M Bachinger (Germany) M Marterer | 2 | 3
(Kazakhstan) M Kukushkin (Ukraine) S Stakhovsky | 6 | 7
(Serbia) N Zimonjić (Germany) M Zverev | 4 | 5
(France) J Benneteau (France) J Eysseric | 3 | 4
4 | (Chile) J Peralta (Argentina) H Zeballos | 6 | 6
(France) J Chardy (France) F Martin | 6 | 7^{7}
(Germany) A Begemann (Germany) K Krawietz | 2 | 6^{4}
WC | (Germany) G Kretschmer (Germany) A Satschko | 7^{7} | 6
2 | (Philippines) T Huey (Belarus) M Mirnyi | 6^{2} | 1

Quarterfinals
1 | (Austria) O Marach (Croatia) M Pavić | 3 | 4
(United States) B Baker (Croatia) N Mektić | 6 | 6
3 | (Colombia) JS Cabal (Colombia) R Farah | 6 | 6
(Italy) F Fognini (Italy) A Seppi | 2 | 4
(Kazakhstan) M Kukushkin (Ukraine) S Stakhovsky | 7^{7} | 4 | [5]
4 | (Chile) J Peralta (Argentina) H Zeballos | 6^{4} | 6 | [10]
(France) J Chardy (France) F Martin | 6 | 7^{7}
WC | (Germany) G Kretschmer (Germany) A Satschko | 3 | 6^{5}

Semifinals
(United States) B Baker (Croatia) N Mektić | 6 | 5 | [7]
3 | (Colombia) JS Cabal (Colombia) R Farah | 3 | 7 | [10]
4 | (Chile) J Peralta (Argentina) H Zeballos | 6^{5} | 2
(France) J Chardy (France) F Martin | 7^{7} | 6

Final
3 | (Colombia) JS Cabal (Colombia) R Farah | 6 | 6
(France) J Chardy (France) F Martin | 3 | 3
