= 2016 BMW Open – Doubles =

Doubles
- 2016 BMW Open

Final
- Champions: (Finland) Henri Kontinen (Australia) John Peers
- Runners-up: (Colombia) Juan Sebastián Cabal (Colombia) Robert Farah
- Score: 6–3, 3–6, [10–7]

Events
| Singles | Doubles |
| ← 2015 · | BMW Open | · 2017 → |

Alexander Peya and Bruno Soares were the defending champions, but Soares chose not to participate this year. Peya played alongside Julian Knowle, but lost in the semifinals to Juan Sebastián Cabal and Robert Farah.
Henri Kontinen and John Peers won the title, defeating Cabal and Farah in the final, 6–3, 3–6, [10–7].

== Seeds ==
1. (Brazil) Marcelo Melo / (Netherlands) Jean-Julien Rojer (first round)
2. (Colombia) Juan Sebastián Cabal / (Colombia) Robert Farah (final)
3. (Finland) Henri Kontinen / (Australia) John Peers (champions)
4. (Austria) Julian Knowle / (Austria) Alexander Peya (semifinals)

== Draw ==
=== Key ===
- Q = Qualifier
- WC = Wild card
- LL = Lucky loser
- Alt = Alternate
- ITF = ITF entry
- PR = Protected ranking
- SR = Special ranking
- SE = Special exempt
- JE = Junior exempt
- JR = Junior Accelerator Programme entrant
- CO = College Accelerator Programme entrant
- NG = Next Gen Accelerator Program entrant
- w/o = Walkover
- r = Retired
- d = Defaulted

=== Draw ===
First round
1 | (Brazil) M Melo (Netherlands) J-J Rojer | 4 | 4
(Austria) O Marach (France) F Martin | 6 | 6
PR | (Germany) D Brown (Germany) F Mayer | 3 | 2
(United Kingdom) K Skupski (United Kingdom) N Skupski | 6 | 6
3 | (Finland) H Kontinen (Australia) J Peers | 6 | 6
WC | (Germany) K Krawietz (Germany) M Marterer | 4 | 2
(Italy) M Cecchinato (Italy) F Fognini | 6 | 4 | [6]
WC | (Germany) A Zverev (Germany) M Zverev | 3 | 6 | [10]
(Russia) M Elgin (Uzbekistan) D Istomin | 7^{7} | 3 | [10]
(Austria) P Oswald (Czech Republic) L Rosol | 6^{1} | 6 | [8]
(Germany) G Kretschmer (Germany) A Satschko | 4 | 3
4 | (Austria) J Knowle (Austria) A Peya | 6 | 6
(Belarus) A Bury (Slovakia) I Zelenay | 6 | 2 | [13]
(Australia) R Junaid (Poland) M Kowalczyk | 2 | 6 | [11]
(Poland) M Fyrstenberg (Mexico) S González | 2 | 2
2 | (Colombia) JS Cabal (Colombia) R Farah | 6 | 6

Quarterfinals
(Austria) O Marach (France) F Martin | 7^{8} | 6
(United Kingdom) K Skupski (United Kingdom) N Skupski | 6^{6} | 3
3 | (Finland) H Kontinen (Australia) J Peers | 6 | 7^{7}
WC | (Germany) A Zverev (Germany) M Zverev | 4 | 6^{5}
(Russia) M Elgin (Uzbekistan) D Istomin | 3 | 4
4 | (Austria) J Knowle (Austria) A Peya | 6 | 6
(Belarus) A Bury (Slovakia) I Zelenay | 6^{3} | 6 | [6]
2 | (Colombia) JS Cabal (Colombia) R Farah | 7^{7} | 4 | [10]

Semifinals
(Austria) O Marach (France) F Martin | 2 | 3
3 | (Finland) H Kontinen (Australia) J Peers | 6 | 6
4 | (Austria) J Knowle (Austria) A Peya | 6^{5} | 3
2 | (Colombia) JS Cabal (Colombia) R Farah | 7^{7} | 6

Final
3 | (Finland) H Kontinen (Australia) J Peers | 6 | 3 | [10]
2 | (Colombia) JS Cabal (Colombia) R Farah | 3 | 6 | [7]
