= 2018 BMW Open – Doubles =

Doubles
- 2018 BMW Open

Final
- Champions: (Croatia) Ivan Dodig (United States) Rajeev Ram
- Runners-up: (Croatia) Nikola Mektić (Austria) Alexander Peya
- Score: 6–3, 7–5

Events
Singles	Doubles
← 2017 ·	BMW Open	· 2019 →

Juan Sebastián Cabal and Robert Farah were the defending champions, but chose not to participate this year.

Ivan Dodig and Rajeev Ram won the title, defeating Nikola Mektić and Alexander Peya in the final, 6–3, 7–5.

== Seeds ==
1. (Poland) Łukasz Kubot / (Brazil) Marcelo Melo (semifinals)
2. (Croatia) Ivan Dodig / (United States) Rajeev Ram (champions)
3. (Croatia) Nikola Mektić / (Austria) Alexander Peya (final)
4. (Belarus) Max Mirnyi / (Austria) Philipp Oswald (quarterfinals)

== Draw ==
=== Key ===
- Q = Qualifier
- WC = Wild card
- LL = Lucky loser
- Alt = Alternate
- ITF = ITF entry
- PR = Protected ranking
- SR = Special ranking
- SE = Special exempt
- JE = Junior exempt
- JR = Junior Accelerator Programme entrant
- CO = College Accelerator Programme entrant
- NG = Next Gen Accelerator Program entrant
- w/o = Walkover
- r = Retired
- d = Defaulted

=== Draw ===
First round
1	(Poland) Ł Kubot (Brazil) M Melo	7^{7}	3	[10]
(Argentina) M González (Argentina) D Schwartzman	6^{3}	6	[4]
(Japan) Y Sugita (Germany) M Zverev	3	4
(Bosnia and Herzegovina) M Bašić (Hungary) M Fucsovics	6	6
3	(Croatia) N Mektić (Austria) A Peya	6	6
WC	(Germany) M Bachinger (Germany) Y Hanfmann	2	3
(Germany) K Krawietz (Germany) M Marterer	7^{9}	5	[10]
WC	(Austria) J Melzer (Germany) P Petzschner	6^{7}	7	[8]
(India) S Balaji (India) V Vardhan	5	7^{7}	[5]
(Germany) T Pütz (Germany) J-L Struff	7	6^{5}	[10]
Alt	(Germany) D Masur (Germany) R Molleker	6	5	[6]
4	(Belarus) M Mirnyi (Austria) P Oswald	3	7	[10]
(Belgium) S Gillé (Belgium) J Vliegen	7^{7}	4	[8]
(Croatia) I Karlović (Serbia) N Zimonjić	6^{4}	6	[10]
(France) F Martin (India) P Raja	7	2	[6]
2	(Croatia) I Dodig (United States) R Ram	5	6	[10]

Quarterfinals
1	(Poland) Ł Kubot (Brazil) M Melo	6	6
(Bosnia and Herzegovina) M Bašić (Hungary) M Fucsovics	1	1
3	(Croatia) N Mektić (Austria) A Peya	7	6
(Germany) K Krawietz (Germany) M Marterer	5	4
(Germany) T Pütz (Germany) J-L Struff	7	7
4	(Belarus) M Mirnyi (Austria) P Oswald	5	5
(Croatia) I Karlović (Serbia) N Zimonjić	3	6	[7]
2	(Croatia) I Dodig (United States) R Ram	6	3	[10]

Semifinals
1	(Poland) Ł Kubot (Brazil) M Melo	6	6^{4}	[5]
3	(Croatia) N Mektić (Austria) A Peya	2	7^{7}	[10]
(Germany) T Pütz (Germany) J-L Struff	1	3
2	(Croatia) I Dodig (United States) R Ram	6	6

Final
3	(Croatia) N Mektić (Austria) A Peya	3	5
2	(Croatia) I Dodig (United States) R Ram	6	7
