= 2016 BMW Open =

- Date: 25 April – 1 May
- Edition: 101st
- Category: ATP World Tour 250 series
- Draw: 28S / 16D
- Prize money: €463,520
- Surface: Clay / outdoor
- Location: Munich, Germany
- Venue: MTTC Iphitos

Champions

Singles
- (Germany) Philipp Kohlschreiber

Doubles
- (Finland) Henri Kontinen / (Australia) John Peers
← 2015 ·	BMW Open	· 2017 →

The 2016 BMW Open was a men's tennis tournament played on outdoor clay courts. It was the 101st edition of the event, and part of the ATP World Tour 250 series of the 2016 ATP World Tour. It took place at the MTTC Iphitos complex in Munich, Germany, from 25 April through 1 May 2016. Fourth-seeded Philipp Kohlschreiber won the singles title.

== Finals ==
=== Singles ===
- (Germany) Philipp Kohlschreiber defeated (Austria) Dominic Thiem, 7–6^{(9–7)}, 4–6, 7–6^{(7–4)}

=== Doubles ===
- (Finland) Henri Kontinen / (Australia) John Peers defeated (Colombia) Juan Sebastián Cabal / (Colombia) Robert Farah, 6–3, 3–6, [10–7]

== Singles main-draw entrants ==
=== Seeds ===
Country	Player	Rank^{1}	Seed
BEL	David Goffin	13	1
~~FRA~~	~~Gaël Monfils~~	~~14~~	~~2~~
AUT	Dominic Thiem	15	3
GER	Philipp Kohlschreiber	27	4
ITA	Fabio Fognini	31	5
BRA	Thomaz Bellucci	35	6
CAN	Vasek Pospisil	44	7
GER	Alexander Zverev	51	8

- Rankings are as of April 18, 2016.

=== Other entrants ===
The following players received wildcards into the main draw:

- (Argentina) Juan Martín del Potro
- (Germany) Maximilian Marterer
- (Germany) Mischa Zverev

The following players received entry from the qualifying draw:

- (Germany) Matthias Bachinger
- (Germany) Florian Mayer
- (Netherlands) Igor Sijsling
- (Germany) Cedrik-Marcel Stebe

The following player received entry as a lucky loser:

- (Slovakia) Jozef Kovalík

=== Withdrawals ===
Before the tournament

- (Cyprus) Marcos Baghdatis → replaced by (Colombia) Santiago Giraldo
- (Spain) Roberto Bautista Agut → replaced by (Italy) Marco Cecchinato
- (Italy) Simone Bolelli → replaced by (Kazakhstan) Mikhail Kukushkin
- (France) Jérémy Chardy → replaced by (Germany) Dustin Brown
- (France) Gaël Monfils → replaced by (Slovakia) Jozef Kovalík

=== Retirements ===
- (Russia) Evgeny Donskoy
- (Russia) Mikhail Youzhny

== Doubles main-draw entrants ==
=== Seeds ===
Country	Player	Country	Player	Rank^{1}	Seed
BRA	Marcelo Melo	NED	Jean-Julien Rojer	8	1
COL	Juan Sebastián Cabal	COL	Robert Farah	43	2
FIN	Henri Kontinen	AUS	John Peers	49	3
AUT	Julian Knowle	AUT	Alexander Peya	89	4

- Rankings are as of April 18, 2016.

=== Other entrants ===
The following pairs received wildcards into the doubles main draw:

- (Germany) Kevin Krawietz / (Germany) Maximilian Marterer
- (Germany) Alexander Zverev / (Germany) Mischa Zverev
