= 2018 BMW Open – Singles =

Singles
- 2018 BMW Open

Final
- Champion: (Germany) Alexander Zverev
- Runner-up: (Germany) Philipp Kohlschreiber
- Score: 6–3, 6–3

Details
- Draw: 28 (4 Q / 3 WC )
- Seeds: 8

Events
Singles	Doubles
← 2017 ·	BMW Open	· 2019 →

Alexander Zverev was the defending champion and successfully defended his title, defeating Philipp Kohlschreiber in the final, 6–3, 6–3.

== Seeds ==
The top four seeds received a bye into the second round.

1. (Germany) Alexander Zverev (champion)
2. (Spain) Roberto Bautista Agut (quarterfinals)
3. (Argentina) Diego Schwartzman (second round)
4. (South Korea) Chung Hyeon (semifinals)
5. (Italy) Fabio Fognini (first round)
6. (Germany) Philipp Kohlschreiber (final)
7. (France) Gaël Monfils (first round)
8. (Japan) Yūichi Sugita (first round)

== Draw ==
=== Key ===
- Q = Qualifier
- WC = Wild card
- LL = Lucky loser
- Alt = Alternate
- ITF = ITF entry
- PR = Protected ranking
- SR = Special ranking
- SE = Special exempt
- JE = Junior exempt
- JR = Junior Accelerator Programme entrant
- CO = College Accelerator Programme entrant
- NG = Next Gen Accelerator Program entrant
- w/o = Walkover
- r = Retired
- d = Defaulted

=== Finals ===
Semifinals
1	(Germany) Alexander Zverev	7	6
4	(South Korea) Chung Hyeon	5	2
(Germany) Maximilian Marterer	2	4
6	(Germany) Philipp Kohlschreiber	6	6

Final
1	(Germany) Alexander Zverev	6	6
6	(Germany) Philipp Kohlschreiber	3	3

=== Top half ===
First round
WC	(Germany) Y Hanfmann	6	6
(Cyprus) M Baghdatis	2	4
Q	(Germany) D Masur	6^{1}	4
(Germany) J-L Struff	7^{7}	6
SE	(Germany) Y Maden	4	7^{11}	6
8	(Japan) Y Sugita	6	6^{9}	2
(Kazakhstan) M Kukushkin	6^{8}	6	3
WC	(Germany) M Bachinger	7^{10}	3	6
(Germany) F Mayer	6	4	3
Q	(Slovakia) M Kližan	3	6	6
(Bosnia and Herzegovina) M Bašić	6	3	6
7	(France) G Monfils	2	6	3

Second round
1	(Germany) A Zverev	6^{12}	6	6
WC	(Germany) Y Hanfmann	7^{14}	4	2
(Germany) J-L Struff	6	3	6
SE	(Germany) Y Maden	3	6	3
4	(South Korea) H Chung	6	6
WC	(Germany) M Bachinger	1	1
Q	(Slovakia) M Kližan	4	6	7
(Bosnia and Herzegovina) M Bašić	6	3	5

Quarterfinals
1	(Germany) A Zverev	6	6
(Germany) J-L Struff	3	2
4	(South Korea) H Chung	6	6
Q	(Slovakia) M Kližan	3	4

Semifinals
1	(Germany) A Zverev	7	6
4	(South Korea) H Chung	5	2

=== Bottom half ===
First round
5	(Italy) F Fognini	7	3	2
SE	(Italy) M Cecchinato	5	6	6
(Hungary) M Fucsovics	6	7
(Argentina) G Pella	4	5
(Germany) M Marterer	5
Q	(Germany) D Brown	6^{r}
6	(Germany) P Kohlschreiber	7	6
(Croatia) I Karlović	5	4
(Germany) M Zverev	6	6
PR	(Austria) A Haider-Maurer	4	3
WC	(Norway) C Ruud	7^{7}	6
Q	(Romania) M Copil	6^{3}	3

Second round
SE	(Italy) M Cecchinato	6^{5}	1
(Hungary) M Fucsovics	7^{7}	6
(Germany) M Marterer	6	6
3	(Argentina) D Schwartzman	4	2
6	(Germany) P Kohlschreiber	6	6
(Germany) M Zverev	2	2
WC	(Norway) C Ruud	4	3
2	(Spain) R Bautista Agut	6	6

Quarterfinals
(Hungary) M Fucsovics	3	4
(Germany) M Marterer	6	6
6	(Germany) P Kohlschreiber	6	6
2	(Spain) R Bautista Agut	4	4

Semifinals
(Germany) M Marterer	2	4
6	(Germany) P Kohlschreiber	6	6

== Qualifying ==
=== Seeds ===
1. (Romania) Marius Copil (qualified)
2. (Estonia) Jürgen Zopp (first round)
3. (Russia) Alexey Vatutin (first round)
4. (Slovakia) Martin Kližan (qualified)
5. (Slovakia) Jozef Kovalík (qualifying competition)
6. (Slovakia) Norbert Gombos (qualifying competition)
7. (Slovakia) Andrej Martin (qualifying competition)
8. (Germany) Dustin Brown (qualified)

=== Qualifiers ===
1. (Romania) Marius Copil
2. (Germany) Dustin Brown
3. (Germany) Daniel Masur
4. (Slovakia) Martin Kližan

=== Qualifying draw ===
==== First qualifier ====
First round
1/Alt	(Romania) Marius Copil	6	6
(Germany) Tim Pütz	3	2
PR	(Austria) Jürgen Melzer	6	3	4
7	(Slovakia) Andrej Martin	1	6	6

Qualifying competition
1/Alt	(Romania) Marius Copil	4	6	6
7	(Slovakia) Andrej Martin	6	3	4

==== Second qualifier ====
First round
2	(Estonia) Jürgen Zopp	3	2
(Austria) Dennis Novak	6	6
Alt	(Germany) Kevin Krawietz	3	6	6^{2}
8	(Germany) Dustin Brown	6	3	7^{7}

Qualifying competition
(Austria) Dennis Novak	3	7^{7}	6^{5}
8	(Germany) Dustin Brown	6	6^{4}	7^{7}

==== Third qualifier ====
First round
3	(Russia) Alexey Vatutin	3	6	3
WC	(Germany) Daniel Masur	6	1	6
WC	(Germany) Rudolf Molleker	6	2	4
6	(Slovakia) Norbert Gombos	2	6	6

Qualifying competition
WC	(Germany) Daniel Masur	6	6^{1}	6
6	(Slovakia) Norbert Gombos	3	7^{7}	4

==== Fourth qualifier ====
First round
4	(Slovakia) Martin Kližan	4	6	6
(Latvia) Ernests Gulbis	6	3	4
(Spain) Sergio Gutiérrez Ferrol	2	6^{3}
5	(Slovakia) Jozef Kovalík	6	7^{7}

Qualifying competition
4	(Slovakia) Martin Kližan	6	6
5	(Slovakia) Jozef Kovalík	1	2
