= 2021 BMW Open =

ATP tennis tournament

- Date: 26 April – 2 May
- Edition: 105th
- Category: ATP Tour 250
- Draw: 28S/16D
- Prize money: €481,270
- Surface: Clay
- Location: Munich, Germany
- Venue: MTTC Iphitos

Champions

Singles
- (Georgia (country)) Nikoloz Basilashvili

Doubles
- (Netherlands) Wesley Koolhof / (Germany) Kevin Krawietz
← 2019 ·	BMW Open	· 2022 →

The 2021 BMW Open was a men's tennis tournament played on outdoor clay courts. It was the 105th edition of the event and part of the ATP Tour 250 series of the 2021 ATP Tour. It took place at the MTTC Iphitos complex in Munich, Germany, from 26 April until 2 May 2021.

== Finals ==
=== Singles ===
- (Georgia (country)) Nikoloz Basilashvili def. (Germany) Jan-Lennard Struff, 6–4, 7–6^{(7–5)}

=== Doubles ===
- (Netherlands) Wesley Koolhof / (Germany) Kevin Krawietz def. (Belgium) Sander Gillé / (Belgium) Joran Vliegen, 4–6, 6–4, [10–5]

== Points and prize money ==
=== Point distribution ===
Event	W	F	SF	QF	Round of 16	Round of 32	Q	Q2	Q1
Singles	250	150	90	45	20	0	12	6	0
Doubles	250	150	90	45	0	—	—	—	—

=== Prize money ===
Event	W	F	SF	QF	Round of 16	Round of 32	Q2	Q1
Singles	€21,655	€16,000	€12,000	€8,200	€5,600	€4,000	€2,050	€1,130
Doubles*	€7,550	€5,530	€4,200	€3,010	€2,200	—	—	—

_{*per team}

== Singles main draw entrants ==
=== Seeds ===
Country	Player	Rank^{1}	Seed
GER	Alexander Zverev	6	1
NOR	Casper Ruud	24	2
~~RUS~~	~~Aslan Karatsev~~	~~28~~	~~3~~
SRB	Filip Krajinović	33	4
GEO	Nikoloz Basilashvili	36	5
SRB	Dušan Lajović	37	6
GER	Jan-Lennard Struff	40	7
AUS	John Millman	43	8

- ^{1} Rankings are as of 19 April 2021.

=== Other entrants ===
The following players received wildcards into the main draw:

- (Germany) Yannick Hanfmann
- (Germany) Philipp Kohlschreiber
- (Germany) Maximilian Marterer

The following players received entry as special exempt:

- (Japan) Taro Daniel

The following players received entry from the qualifying draw:

- (Colombia) Daniel Elahi Galán
- (Belarus) Ilya Ivashka
- (United States) Mackenzie McDonald
- (Germany) Cedrik-Marcel Stebe

The following players received entry as lucky losers:

- (Lithuania) Ričardas Berankis
- (Slovakia) Norbert Gombos
- (Slovakia) Andrej Martin

=== Withdrawals ===
Before the tournament

- (United Kingdom) Dan Evans → replaced by (Belarus) Egor Gerasimov
- (Hungary) Márton Fucsovics → replaced by (Lithuania) Ričardas Berankis
- (Poland) Hubert Hurkacz → replaced by (Brazil) Thiago Monteiro
- (Russia) Aslan Karatsev → replaced by (Slovakia) Norbert Gombos
- (Japan) Yoshihito Nishioka → replaced by (Uruguay) Pablo Cuevas
- (Italy) Jannik Sinner → replaced by (United States) Sebastian Korda
- (Italy) Lorenzo Sonego → replaced by (Australia) Alexei Popyrin
- (Italy) Stefano Travaglia → replaced by (Slovakia) Andrej Martin
- (Czech Republic) Jiří Veselý → replaced by (Argentina) Federico Coria

During the tournament

- (Germany) Yannick Hanfmann

=== Retirements ===
- (Belarus) Egor Gerasimov
- (Argentina) Guido Pella

== Doubles main draw entrants ==
=== Seeds ===
Country	Player	Country	Player	Rank^{1}	Seed
NED	Wesley Koolhof	GER	Kevin Krawietz	30	1
AUS	John Peers	AUS	Luke Saville	62	2
BEL	Sander Gillé	BEL	Joran Vliegen	67	3
NZL	Marcus Daniell	AUT	Philipp Oswald	71	4

- ^{1} Rankings are as of 19 April 2021

=== Other entrants ===
The following pairs received wildcards into the doubles main draw:

- (Germany) Dustin Brown / (Germany) Peter Gojowczyk
- (Brazil) Marcelo Melo / (Germany) Mischa Zverev

=== Withdrawals ===
Before the tournament

- (Netherlands) Wesley Koolhof / (Poland) Łukasz Kubot → replaced by (Kazakhstan) Andrey Golubev / (Italy) Andrea Vavassori
- (Germany) Kevin Krawietz / (Romania) Horia Tecău → replaced by (Germany) Yannick Hanfmann / (Germany) Dominik Koepfer
- (Brazil) Marcelo Melo / (Netherlands) Jean-Julien Rojer → replaced by (Finland) Harri Heliövaara / (Finland) Emil Ruusuvuori
- (United States) Rajeev Ram / (United Kingdom) Joe Salisbury → replaced by (Netherlands) Wesley Koolhof / (Germany) Kevin Krawietz
- (United Kingdom) Ken Skupski / (United Kingdom) Neal Skupski → replaced by (Israel) Jonathan Erlich / (India) Divij Sharan

During the tournament

- (Argentina) Federico Coria / (Argentina) Guido Pella
- (Germany) Yannick Hanfmann / (Germany) Dominik Koepfer
- (United Kingdom) Jonny O'Mara / (Pakistan) Aisam-ul-Haq Qureshi
