= 2019 BMW Open – Doubles =

Doubles
- 2019 BMW Open

Final
- Champions: (Denmark) Frederik Nielsen (Germany) Tim Pütz
- Runners-up: (Brazil) Marcelo Demoliner (India) Divij Sharan
- Score: 6–4, 6–2

Events
| Singles | Doubles |
| ← 2018 · | BMW Open | · 2021 → |

Ivan Dodig and Rajeev Ram were the defending champions, but Dodig chose not to participate and Ram chose to compete in Estoril instead.

Frederik Nielsen and Tim Pütz won the title, defeating Marcelo Demoliner and Divij Sharan in the final, 6–4, 6–2.

== Seeds ==
1. (India) Rohan Bopanna / (United Kingdom) Dominic Inglot (first round)
2. (United States) Austin Krajicek / (New Zealand) Artem Sitak (quarterfinals)
3. (United Kingdom) Ken Skupski / (United Kingdom) Neal Skupski (quarterfinals)
4. (Czech Republic) Roman Jebavý / (Argentina) Andrés Molteni (first round)

== Draw ==
=== Key ===
- Q = Qualifier
- WC = Wild card
- LL = Lucky loser
- Alt = Alternate
- ITF = ITF entry
- PR = Protected ranking
- SR = Special ranking
- SE = Special exempt
- JE = Junior exempt
- JR = Junior Accelerator Programme entrant
- CO = College Accelerator Programme entrant
- NG = Next Gen Accelerator Program entrant
- w/o = Walkover
- r = Retired
- d = Defaulted

=== Draw ===
First round
1 | (India) R Bopanna (United Kingdom) D Inglot | 3 | 6 | [10]
(Brazil) M Demoliner (India) D Sharan | 6 | 3 | [12]
(Germany) K Krawietz (Germany) A Mies | 6 | 6
WC | (Germany) M Bachinger (Germany) P Gojowczyk | 3 | 4
3 | (United Kingdom) K Skupski (United Kingdom) N Skupski | 6 | 1 | [10]
(Argentina) G Pella (Argentina) D Schwartzman | 4 | 6 | [3]
(Chinese Taipei) C-p Hsieh (Indonesia) C Rungkat | 5 | 6^{4}
(Austria) P Oswald (Croatia) M Pavić | 7 | 7^{7}
(Ukraine) D Molchanov (Slovakia) I Zelenay | 6 | 6
(Italy) M Cecchinato (Italy) A Seppi | 4 | 2
(Chile) C Garín (Argentina) JI Londero | 6 | 7^{7}
4 | (Czech Republic) R Jebavý (Argentina) A Molteni | 3 | 6^{5}
Alt | (Germany) A Begemann (Germany) R Molleker | 6 | 1 | [6]
(Denmark) F Nielsen (Germany) T Pütz | 3 | 6 | [10]
WC | (Germany) Y Maden (Germany) M Marterer | 7^{7} | 1 | [6]
2 | (United States) A Krajicek (New Zealand) A Sitak | 6^{4} | 6 | [10]

Quarterfinals
(Brazil) M Demoliner (India) D Sharan | 4 | 6 | [10]
(Germany) K Krawietz (Germany) A Mies | 6 | 3 | [8]
3 | (United Kingdom) K Skupski (United Kingdom) N Skupski | 4 | 4
(Austria) P Oswald (Croatia) M Pavić | 6 | 6
(Ukraine) D Molchanov (Slovakia) I Zelenay | 6 | 6
(Chile) C Garín (Argentina) JI Londero | 3 | 4
(Denmark) F Nielsen (Germany) T Pütz | 6 | 6
2 | (United States) A Krajicek (New Zealand) A Sitak | 2 | 4

Semifinals
(Brazil) M Demoliner (India) D Sharan | 6 | 3 | [10]
(Austria) P Oswald (Croatia) M Pavić | 3 | 6 | [4]
(Ukraine) D Molchanov (Slovakia) I Zelenay | 3 | 7 | [9]
(Denmark) F Nielsen (Germany) T Pütz | 6 | 5 | [11]

Final
(Brazil) M Demoliner (India) D Sharan | 4 | 2
(Denmark) F Nielsen (Germany) T Pütz | 6 | 6
