= 2017 BMW Open – Singles =

Singles
- 2017 BMW Open

Final
- Champion: (Germany) Alexander Zverev
- Runner-up: (Argentina) Guido Pella
- Score: 6–4, 6–3

Details
- Draw: 28 (4 Q / 3 WC )
- Seeds: 8

Events
| Singles | Doubles |
| ← 2016 · | BMW Open | · 2018 → |

Philipp Kohlschreiber was the defending champion, but lost in the second round to Horacio Zeballos.

Alexander Zverev won the title, defeating Guido Pella in the final, 6–4, 6–3.

== Seeds ==
The top four seeds receive a bye into the second round.

1. (France) Gaël Monfils (second round)
2. (Spain) Roberto Bautista Agut (semifinals)
3. (Germany) Alexander Zverev (champion)
4. (Italy) Fabio Fognini (second round)
5. (Germany) Philipp Kohlschreiber (second round)
6. (Germany) Mischa Zverev (second round)
7. (Germany) Jan-Lennard Struff (quarterfinals)
8. (Brazil) Thomaz Bellucci (second round)

== Draw ==
=== Key ===
- Q = Qualifier
- WC = Wild card
- LL = Lucky loser
- Alt = Alternate
- ITF = ITF entry
- PR = Protected ranking
- SR = Special ranking
- SE = Special exempt
- JE = Junior exempt
- JR = Junior Accelerator Programme entrant
- CO = College Accelerator Programme entrant
- NG = Next Gen Accelerator Program entrant
- w/o = Walkover
- r = Retired
- d = Defaulted

=== Finals ===
Semifinals
(South Korea) Chung Hyeon | 6 | 5 | 4
Q | (Argentina) Guido Pella | 4 | 7 | 6
3 | (Germany) Alexander Zverev | 7 | 7
2 | (Spain) Roberto Bautista Agut | 5 | 5

Final
Q | (Argentina) Guido Pella | 4 | 3
3 | (Germany) Alexander Zverev | 6 | 6

=== Top half ===
First round
WC | (Germany) M Marterer | 6^{10} | 6 | 3
(South Korea) H Chung | 7^{12} | 4 | 6
(Slovakia) M Kližan | 4 | 6 | 6
(Argentina) N Kicker | 6 | 4 | 3
(Germany) D Brown | 4 | 7^{7} | 3
6 | (Germany) M Zverev | 6 | 6^{4} | 6
Q | (Germany) C-M Stebe | 0 | 2
Q | (Argentina) G Pella | 6 | 6
(Argentina) H Zeballos | 5 | 6 | 7
(Italy) A Seppi | 7 | 2 | 5
WC | (Norway) C Ruud | 4 | 3
5 | (Germany) P Kohlschreiber | 6 | 6

Second round
1 | (France) G Monfils | 2 | 4
(South Korea) H Chung | 6 | 6
(Slovakia) M Kližan | 6 | 6
6 | (Germany) M Zverev | 2 | 1
4 | (Italy) F Fognini | 3 | 2
Q | (Argentina) G Pella | 6 | 6
(Argentina) H Zeballos | 7^{7} | 6
5 | (Germany) P Kohlschreiber | 6^{5} | 4

Quarterfinals
(South Korea) H Chung | 6 | 3 | 6
(Slovakia) M Kližan | 4 | 6 | 2
Q | (Argentina) G Pella | 6 | 6^{5} | 7^{7}
(Argentina) H Zeballos | 3 | 7^{7} | 6^{3}

Semifinals
(South Korea) H Chung | 6 | 5 | 4
Q | (Argentina) G Pella | 4 | 7 | 6

=== Bottom half ===
First round
7 | (Germany) J-L Struff | 6 | 6
WC | (Germany) D Masur | 3 | 4
(Ukraine) S Stakhovsky | 6 | 3 | 4
PR | (Germany) T Haas | 1 | 6 | 6
Q | (Slovakia) J Kovalík | 2 | 4
(France) J Chardy | 6 | 6
8 | (Brazil) T Bellucci | 6 | 6
(Kazakhstan) M Kukushkin | 3 | 2
(Austria) G Melzer | 4 | 7 | 1
Q | (Germany) Y Hanfmann | 6 | 5 | 6
(Brazil) T Monteiro | 6 | 5 | 4
(Romania) M Copil | 4 | 7 | 6

Second round
7 | (Germany) J-L Struff | 6 | 7
PR | (Germany) T Haas | 4 | 5
(France) J Chardy | 4 | 4
3 | (Germany) A Zverev | 6 | 6
8 | (Brazil) T Bellucci | 6^{5} | 6 | 5
Q | (Germany) Y Hanfmann | 7^{7} | 4 | 7
(Romania) M Copil | 6 | 6^{3} | 5
2 | (Spain) R Bautista Agut | 4 | 7^{7} | 7

Quarterfinals
7 | (Germany) J-L Struff | 6 | 6^{3} | 6^{5}
3 | (Germany) A Zverev | 3 | 7^{7} | 7^{7}
Q | (Germany) Y Hanfmann | 3 | 3
2 | (Spain) R Bautista Agut | 6 | 6

Semifinals
3 | (Germany) A Zverev | 7 | 7
2 | (Spain) R Bautista Agut | 5 | 5

== Qualifying ==
=== Seeds ===
1. (Ukraine) Sergiy Stakhovsky (moved to main draw)
2. (France) Julien Benneteau (first round)
3. (Belgium) Arthur De Greef (first round)
4. (Kazakhstan) Alexander Bublik (first round)
5. (Slovakia) Jozef Kovalík (qualified)
6. (Belarus) Uladzimir Ignatik (qualifying competition)
7. (Argentina) Guido Pella (qualified)
8. (Poland) Jerzy Janowicz (qualifying competition)

=== Qualifiers ===
1. (Slovakia) Jozef Kovalík
2. (Germany) Cedrik-Marcel Stebe
3. (Germany) Yannick Hanfmann
4. (Argentina) Guido Pella

=== Qualifying draw ===
==== First qualifier ====
| First round | | | | Qualifying competition |
| | | | | | (Germany) Jeremy Jahn | 5 | 3 |
| | | | | 5 | (Slovakia) Jozef Kovalík | 7 | 6 |
| | (Germany) Yannick Maden | 3 | 4 | 5 | (Slovakia) Jozef Kovalík | 7 | 6 |
| 5 | (Slovakia) Jozef Kovalík | 6 | 6 |

==== Second qualifier ====
First round
2 | (France) Julien Benneteau | 2 | 3
WC | (Germany) Cedrik-Marcel Stebe | 6 | 6
WC | (Germany) Matthias Bachinger | 4 | 6 | 3
8 | (Poland) Jerzy Janowicz | 6 | 4 | 6

Qualifying competition
WC | (Germany) Cedrik-Marcel Stebe | 7^{12} | 6
8 | (Poland) Jerzy Janowicz | 6^{10} | 2

==== Third qualifier ====
First round
3 | (Belgium) Arthur De Greef | 6^{4} | 7 | 4
(Germany) Yannick Hanfmann | 7^{7} | 5 | 6
Alt | (Germany) Charly Zick | 1 | 3
6 | (Belarus) Uladzimir Ignatik | 6 | 6

Qualifying competition
(Germany) Yannick Hanfmann | 6 | 7^{7}
6 | (Belarus) Uladzimir Ignatik | 4 | 6^{3}

==== Fourth qualifier ====
First round
4 | (Kazakhstan) Alexander Bublik | 1 | 3
(Belgium) Yannick Mertens | 6 | 6
(France) Jonathan Eysseric | 5 | 2
7 | (Argentina) Guido Pella | 7 | 6

Qualifying competition
(Belgium) Yannick Mertens | 3 | 4
7 | (Argentina) Guido Pella | 6 | 6
