= 2019 BMW Open =

- Date: 29 April – 5 May
- Edition: 104th
- Category: ATP Tour 250 series
- Draw: 28S / 16D
- Surface: Clay
- Location: Munich, Germany
- Venue: MTTC Iphitos

Champions

Singles
- (Chile) Cristian Garín

Doubles
- (Denmark) Frederik Nielsen / (Germany) Tim Pütz
← 2018 ·	BMW Open	· 2021 →

The 2019 BMW Open (also known as the BMW Open by FWU for sponsorship reasons) was a men's tennis tournament played on outdoor clay courts. It was the 104th edition of the event and part of the ATP Tour 250 series of the 2019 ATP Tour. It took place at the MTTC Iphitos complex in Munich, Germany, from 29 April until 5 May 2019.

== Singles main draw entrants ==
=== Seeds ===
Country	Player	Rank^{1}	Seed
GER	Alexander Zverev	3	1
RUS	Karen Khachanov	13	2
ITA	Marco Cecchinato	17	3
ESP	Roberto Bautista Agut	21	4
GBR	Kyle Edmund	23	5
ARG	Diego Schwartzman	25	6
ARG	Guido Pella	28	7
HUN	Márton Fucsovics	36	8

- Rankings are as of April 22, 2019.

=== Other entrants ===
The following players received wildcards into the main draw:

- (Russia) Karen Khachanov
- (Germany) Maximilian Marterer
- (Germany) Rudolf Molleker

The following players received entry from the qualifying draw:

- (Uzbekistan) Denis Istomin
- (Germany) Yannick Maden
- (Brazil) Thiago Monteiro
- (Italy) Lorenzo Sonego

=== Withdrawals ===
- (Moldova) Radu Albot → replaced by (Romania) Marius Copil

== Doubles main draw entrants ==
=== Seeds ===
Country	Player	Country	Player	Rank^{1}	Seed
IND	Rohan Bopanna	GBR	Dominic Inglot	67	1
USA	Austin Krajicek	NZL	Artem Sitak	81	2
GBR	Ken Skupski	GBR	Neal Skupski	91	3
CZE	Roman Jebavý	ARG	Andrés Molteni	100	4

- Rankings are as of April 22, 2019.

=== Other entrants ===
The following pairs received wildcards into the doubles main draw:

- (Germany) Matthias Bachinger / (Germany) Peter Gojowczyk
- (Germany) Yannick Maden / (Germany) Maximilian Marterer

The following pairs received entry as alternates:

- (Germany) Andre Begemann / (Germany) Rudolf Molleker

=== Withdrawals ===
Before the tournament

- (France) Benoît Paire (Illness)

== Champions ==
=== Singles ===
- (Chile) Cristian Garín def. (Italy) Matteo Berrettini, 6–1, 3–6, 7–6^{(7–1)}

=== Doubles ===
- (Denmark) Frederik Nielsen / (Germany) Tim Pütz def. (Brazil) Marcelo Demoliner / (India) Divij Sharan, 6–4, 6–2
