= 2021 BMW Open – Singles =

Singles
- 2021 BMW Open

Final
- Champion: (Georgia (country)) Nikoloz Basilashvili
- Runner-up: (Germany) Jan-Lennard Struff
- Score: 6–4, 7–6^{(7–5)}

Details
- Draw: 28 (4 Q / 3 WC )
- Seeds: 8

Events
Singles	Doubles
← 2019 ·	BMW Open	· 2022 →

Nikoloz Basilashvili defeated Jan-Lennard Struff in the final, 6–4, 7–6^{(7–5)} to win the men's singles tennis title at the 2021 Bavarian International Tennis Championships. After not dropping a set en route to his victory, Basilashvili earned his second title of the season and his fifth career ATP Tour singles title overall. Struff was in contention to win his first title in his first tour-level final.

Cristian Garín was the defending champion from when the tournament was last held in 2019, but he competed at the simultaneous Estoril Open instead.

== Seeds ==
The top four seeds received a bye into the second round.

1. (Germany) Alexander Zverev (quarterfinals)
2. (Norway) Casper Ruud (semifinals)
3. (Russia) Aslan Karatsev (withdrew)
4. (Serbia) Filip Krajinović (quarterfinals)
5. (Georgia (country)) Nikoloz Basilashvili (champion)
6. (Serbia) Dušan Lajović (first round)
7. (Germany) Jan-Lennard Struff (final)
8. (Australia) John Millman (quarterfinals)

== Draw ==
=== Key ===
- Q = Qualifier
- WC = Wild card
- LL = Lucky loser
- Alt = Alternate
- ITF = ITF entry
- PR = Protected ranking
- SR = Special ranking
- SE = Special exempt
- JE = Junior exempt
- JR = Junior Accelerator Programme entrant
- CO = College Accelerator Programme entrant
- NG = Next Gen Accelerator Program entrant
- w/o = Walkover
- r = Retired
- d = Defaulted

=== Finals ===
Semifinals
Q	(Belarus) Ilya Ivashka	4	1
7	(Germany) Jan-Lennard Struff	6	6
5	(Georgia (country)) Nikoloz Basilashvili	6	6
2	(Norway) Casper Ruud	1	2

Final
7	(Germany) Jan-Lennard Struff	4	6^{5}
5	(Georgia (country)) Nikoloz Basilashvili	6	7^{7}

=== Top half ===
First round
LL	(Lithuania) R Berankis	7^{12}	6
WC	(Germany) M Marterer	6^{10}	3
(Finland) E Ruusuvuori	1	2
Q	(Belarus) I Ivashka	6	6
Q	(United States) M McDonald	6	6
6	(Serbia) D Lajović	4	4
SE	(Japan) T Daniel	2	6	6^{5}
WC	(Germany) Y Hanfmann	6	3	7^{7}
(Germany) D Koepfer	4	6	6
WC	(Germany) P Kohlschreiber	6	4	3
LL	(Slovakia) A Martin	4	3
7	(Germany) J-L Struff	6	6

Second round
1	(Germany) A Zverev	6	6
LL	(Lithuania) R Berankis	2	4
Q	(Belarus) I Ivashka	6^{7}	6	6
Q	(United States) M McDonald	7^{9}	1	2
4	(Serbia) F Krajinović	w/o
WC	(Germany) Y Hanfmann
(Germany) D Koepfer	6^{3}	7^{7}	2
7	(Germany) J-L Struff	7^{7}	6^{0}	6

Quarterfinals
1	(Germany) A Zverev	7^{7}	5	3
Q	(Belarus) I Ivashka	6^{5}	7	6
4	(Serbia) F Krajinović	4	6	6^{3}
7	(Germany) J-L Struff	6	4	7^{7}

Semifinals
Q	(Belarus) I Ivashka	4	1
7	(Germany) J-L Struff	6	6

=== Bottom half ===
First round
5	(Georgia (country)) N Basilashvili	6	6
(Brazil) T Monteiro	2	3
Q	(Colombia) DE Galán	6	7^{9}
(United States) S Korda	1	6^{7}
Q	(Germany) C-M Stebe	3	6	2
(Argentina) F Coria	6	3	6
8	(Australia) J Millman	7^{7}	3	7
(Australia) A Popyrin	6^{3}	6	5
(Argentina) G Pella	6	2
(Belarus) E Gerasimov	0	0^{r}
(Uruguay) P Cuevas	7^{7}	0	6
(United States) T Sandgren	6^{4}	6	1

Second round
5	(Georgia (country)) N Basilashvili	6	6
Q	(Colombia) DE Galán	4	2
(Argentina) F Coria	4	1
LL	(Slovakia) N Gombos	6	6
8	(Australia) J Millman	4	2
(Argentina) G Pella	6	0^{r}
(Uruguay) P Cuevas	3	2
2	(Norway) C Ruud	6	6

Quarterfinals
5	(Georgia (country)) N Basilashvili	6	6
LL	(Slovakia) N Gombos	4	4
8	(Australia) J Millman	3	4
2	(Norway) C Ruud	6	6

Semifinals
5	(Georgia (country)) N Basilashvili	6	6
2	(Norway) C Ruud	1	2

== Qualifying ==
=== Seeds ===
1. (Lithuania) Ričardas Berankis (qualifying competition, lucky loser)
2. (Slovakia) Norbert Gombos (qualifying competition, lucky loser)
3. (Slovakia) Andrej Martin (qualifying competition, lucky loser)
4. (Japan) Yūichi Sugita (first round)
5. (Austria) Dennis Novak (qualifying competition)
6. (Belarus) Ilya Ivashka (qualified)
7. (Colombia) Daniel Elahi Galán (qualified)
8. (United States) Mackenzie McDonald (qualified)

=== Qualifiers ===
1. (Belarus) Ilya Ivashka
2. (Colombia) Daniel Elahi Galán
3. (United States) Mackenzie McDonald
4. (Germany) Cedrik-Marcel Stebe

=== Lucky losers ===
1. (Lithuania) Ričardas Berankis
2. (Slovakia) Norbert Gombos
3. (Slovakia) Andrej Martin

=== Qualifying draw ===
==== First qualifier ====
First round
1	(Lithuania) Ričardas Berankis	1	6	6
WC	(Germany) Max Hans Rehberg	6	3	4
(Poland) Kamil Majchrzak	4	6^{5}
6	(Belarus) Ilya Ivashka	6	7^{7}

Qualifying competition
1	(Lithuania) Ričardas Berankis	2	6	0
6	(Belarus) Ilya Ivashka	6	3	6

==== Second qualifier ====
First round
2	(Slovakia) Norbert Gombos	6	6^{2}	6
(India) Sumit Nagal	4	7^{7}	1
WC	(Germany) Mischa Zverev	3	3
7	(Colombia) Daniel Elahi Galán	6	6

Qualifying competition
2	(Slovakia) Norbert Gombos	3	4
7	(Colombia) Daniel Elahi Galán	6	6

==== Third qualifier ====
First round
3	(Slovakia) Andrej Martin	6	6
(Austria) Jurij Rodionov	1	1
(Germany) Peter Gojowczyk	1	2
8	(United States) Mackenzie McDonald	6	6

Qualifying competition
3	(Slovakia) Andrej Martin	3	2
8	(United States) Mackenzie McDonald	6	6

==== Fourth qualifier ====
First round
4	(Japan) Yūichi Sugita	4	3
(Germany) Cedrik-Marcel Stebe	6	6
(India) Prajnesh Gunneswaran	4	6	5
5	(Austria) Dennis Novak	6	3	7

Qualifying competition
(Germany) Cedrik-Marcel Stebe	6	7
5	(Austria) Dennis Novak	4	5
