= 2018 BMW Open =

- Date: 30 April – 6 May
- Edition: 103rd
- Category: ATP World Tour 250 series
- Draw: 28S / 16D
- Prize money: €501,345
- Surface: Clay
- Location: Munich, Germany
- Venue: MTTC Iphitos

Champions

Singles
- (Germany) Alexander Zverev

Doubles
- (Croatia) Ivan Dodig / (United States) Rajeev Ram
← 2017 ·	BMW Open	· 2019 →

The 2018 BMW Open was a men's tennis tournament played on outdoor clay courts. It was the 103rd edition of the tournament, and part of the ATP World Tour 250 series of the 2018 ATP World Tour. It took place at the MTTC Iphitos complex in Munich, Germany, from 30 April until 6 May 2018. First-seeded Alexander Zverev won the singles title.

== Finals ==
=== Singles ===
- (Germany) Alexander Zverev defeated (Germany) Philipp Kohlschreiber, 6–3, 6–3

=== Doubles ===
- (Croatia) Ivan Dodig / (United States) Rajeev Ram defeated (Croatia) Nikola Mektić / (Austria) Alexander Peya, 6–3, 7–5

== Singles main-draw entrants ==
=== Seeds ===
Country	Player	Rank^{1}	Seed
GER	Alexander Zverev	3	1
ESP	Roberto Bautista Agut	15	2
ARG	Diego Schwartzman	17	3
KOR	Chung Hyeon	19	4
ITA	Fabio Fognini	20	5
GER	Philipp Kohlschreiber	35	6
FRA	Gaël Monfils	41	7
JPN	Yūichi Sugita	42	8

- Rankings are as of April 23, 2018.

=== Other entrants ===
The following players received wildcards into the main draw:

- (Germany) Matthias Bachinger
- (Germany) Yannick Hanfmann
- (Norway) Casper Ruud

The following players received entry as special exempts:

- (Italy) Marco Cecchinato
- (Germany) Yannick Maden

The following players received entry using a protected ranking:

- (Austria) Andreas Haider-Maurer

The following players received entry from the qualifying draw:

- (Germany) Dustin Brown
- (Romania) Marius Copil
- (Slovakia) Martin Kližan
- (Germany) Daniel Masur

=== Withdrawals ===
Before the tournament

- (Russia) Andrey Rublev → replaced by (Kazakhstan) Mikhail Kukushkin

=== Retirements ===
- (Germany) Dustin Brown

== Doubles main-draw entrants ==
=== Seeds ===
Country	Player	Country	Player	Rank^{1}	Seed
POL	Łukasz Kubot	BRA	Marcelo Melo	2	1
CRO	Ivan Dodig	USA	Rajeev Ram	37	2
CRO	Nikola Mektić	AUT	Alexander Peya	58	3
BLR	Max Mirnyi	AUT	Philipp Oswald	77	4

- Rankings are as of April 23, 2018.

=== Other entrants ===
The following pairs received wildcards into the doubles main draw:

- (Germany) Matthias Bachinger / (Germany) Yannick Hanfmann
- (Austria) Jürgen Melzer / (Germany) Philipp Petzschner

The following pair received entry as alternates:

- (Germany) Daniel Masur / (Germany) Rudolf Molleker

=== Withdrawals ===
Before the tournament

- (Austria) Julian Knowle
