= 2022 BMW Open =

ATP tennis tournament

- Date: 25 April – 1 May
- Edition: 106th
- Category: ATP Tour 250
- Draw: 28S/16D
- Prize money: €534,555
- Surface: Clay
- Location: Munich, Germany
- Venue: MTTC Iphitos

Champions

Singles
- (Denmark) Holger Rune

Doubles
- (Germany) Kevin Krawietz / (Germany) Andreas Mies
← 2021 ·	BMW Open	· 2023 →

The 2022 BMW Open was a men's tennis tournament played on outdoor clay courts. It was the 106th edition of the event and part of the ATP Tour 250 series of the 2022 ATP Tour. It took place at the MTTC Iphitos complex in Munich, Germany, from 25 April until 1 May 2022.

== Finals ==
=== Singles ===
- (Denmark) Holger Rune def. (Netherlands) Botic van de Zandschulp, 3–4, ret.

=== Doubles ===
- (Germany) Kevin Krawietz / (Germany) Andreas Mies def. (Brazil) Rafael Matos / (Spain) David Vega Hernández, 4–6, 6–4, [10–7]

== Point distribution ==
Event	W	F	SF	QF	Round of 16	Round of 32	Q	Q2	Q1
Singles	250	150	90	45	20	0	12	6	0
Doubles	250	150	90	45	0	—	—	—	—

== Singles main draw entrants ==
=== Seeds ===
Country	Player	Rank	Seed
GER	Alexander Zverev	3	1
NOR	Casper Ruud	7	2
USA	Reilly Opelka	17	3
GEO	Nikoloz Basilashvili	20	4
CHI	Cristian Garín	31	5
GBR	Dan Evans	36	6
SRB	Miomir Kecmanović	38	7
NED	Botic van de Zandschulp	41	8

- Rankings are as of 18 April 2022.

=== Other entrants ===
The following players received wildcards into the main draw:

- (Germany) Philipp Kohlschreiber
- (Germany) Max Hans Rehberg
- (Denmark) Holger Rune

The following players received entry from the qualifying draw:

- Egor Gerasimov
- (Czech Republic) Jiří Lehečka
- (Japan) Yoshihito Nishioka
- (Serbia) Marko Topo

The following players received entry as lucky losers:

- (Slovakia) Norbert Gombos
- (Chile) Alejandro Tabilo

=== Withdrawals ===
Before the tournament

- (Kazakhstan) Alexander Bublik → replaced by (United States) Maxime Cressy
- (Hungary) Márton Fucsovics → replaced by (Slovakia) Norbert Gombos
- (Netherlands) Tallon Griekspoor → replaced by (Australia) John Millman
- (Serbia) Filip Krajinović → replaced by (Chile) Alejandro Tabilo
- (Germany) Jan-Lennard Struff → replaced by (Finland) Emil Ruusuvuori

== Doubles main draw entrants ==
=== Seeds ===
Country	Player	Country	Player	Rank	Seed
CRO	Nikola Mektić	CRO	Mate Pavić	11	1
AUS	John Peers	SVK	Filip Polášek	24	2
GER	Kevin Krawietz	GER	Andreas Mies	54	3
IND	Rohan Bopanna	NED	Matwé Middelkoop	59	4

- Rankings are as of 18 April 2022

=== Other entrants ===
The following pairs received wildcards into the doubles main draw:

- (Germany) Yannick Hanfmann / (Germany) Daniel Masur
- (Germany) Philipp Kohlschreiber / (Germany) Max Hans Rehberg

The following pairs received entry as alternates:

- (Romania) Victor Vlad Cornea / (Greece) Petros Tsitsipas
- (Germany) Philip Florig / (Germany) Maximilian Homberg

=== Withdrawals ===
- (Kazakhstan) Alexander Bublik / Ilya Ivashka → replaced by (United Kingdom) Lloyd Glasspool / (Finland) Harri Heliövaara
- (Colombia) Juan Sebastián Cabal / (Colombia) Robert Farah → replaced by (Germany) Daniel Altmaier / (Germany) Oscar Otte
- (Hungary) Márton Fucsovics / (United States) Mackenzie McDonald → replaced by (Romania) Victor Vlad Cornea / (Greece) Petros Tsitsipas
- (Belgium) Sander Gillé / (Belgium) Joran Vliegen → replaced by (Germany) Philip Florig / (Germany) Maximilan Homberg
- (Czech Republic) Roman Jebavý / (Slovakia) Alex Molčan → (Czech Republic) Roman Jebavý / (Argentina) Andrés Molteni
- (Australia) Alex de Minaur / (Spain) David Vega Hernández → replaced by (Brazil) Rafael Matos / (Spain) David Vega Hernández
- (Germany) Tim Pütz / (New Zealand) Michael Venus → replaced by (Serbia) Ivan Sabanov / (Serbia) Matej Sabanov
