= 2022 BMW Open – Singles =

Singles
- 2022 BMW Open

Final
- Champion: (Denmark) Holger Rune
- Runner-up: (Netherlands) Botic van de Zandschulp
- Score: 3–4 ret.

Details
- Draw: 28 (4 Q / 3 WC )
- Seeds: 8

Events
Singles	Doubles
← 2021 ·	BMW Open	· 2023 →

Holger Rune defeated Botic van de Zandschulp in the final by retirement, 3–4 to win the singles tennis title at the 2022 Bavarian International Tennis Championships. It was Rune's first ATP Tour title, making him the third-youngest Munich champion in the Open Era and the first Dane to win an ATP Tour title since Kenneth Carlsen at 2005 Memphis. Van de Zandschulp was also contesting for his first title in his first tour final.

Nikoloz Basilashvili was the defending champion, but lost in the quarterfinals to Miomir Kecmanović.

== Seeds ==
The top four seeds received a bye into the second round.

1. (Germany) Alexander Zverev (second round)
2. (Norway) Casper Ruud (quarterfinals)
3. (United States) Reilly Opelka (second round)
4. (Georgia (country)) Nikoloz Basilashvili (quarterfinals)
5. (Chile) Cristian Garín (first round)
6. (United Kingdom) Dan Evans (first round)
7. (Serbia) Miomir Kecmanović (semifinals)
8. (Netherlands) Botic van de Zandschulp (final, retired)

== Draw ==
=== Key ===
- Q = Qualifier
- WC = Wild card
- LL = Lucky loser
- Alt = Alternate
- SE = Special exempt
- PR = Protected ranking
- ITF = ITF entry
- JE = Junior exempt
- w/o = Walkover
- r = Retired
- d = Defaulted
- SR = Special ranking

=== Finals ===
Semifinals
WC	(Denmark) Holger Rune	6	6
(Germany) Oscar Otte	4	4
7	(Serbia) Miomir Kecmanović	6	6^{4}	4
8	(Netherlands) Botic van de Zandschulp	2	7^{7}	6

Final
WC	(Denmark) Holger Rune	3
8	(Netherlands) Botic van de Zandschulp	4^{r}

=== Top half ===
First round
Q	(Czech Republic) J Lehečka	6^{4}	3
WC	(Denmark) H Rune	7^{7}	6
Q	(Japan) Y Nishioka	6^{5}	5
(Finland) E Ruusuvuori	7^{7}	7
(United States) M Cressy	6	6
6	(United Kingdom) D Evans	4	4
(Germany) O Otte	6	6
Q	(Serbia) M Topo	1	2
(France) H Gaston	6	6^{4}	7
(United States) M Giron	4	7^{7}	5
LL	(Chile) A Tabilo	6	6
5	(Chile) C Garín	3	4

Second round
1	(Germany) A Zverev	3	2
WC	(Denmark) H Rune	6	6
(Finland) E Ruusuvuori	6	6
(United States) M Cressy	3	3
3	(United States) R Opelka	6^{4}	2
(Germany) O Otte	7^{7}	6
(France) H Gaston	2	6	1^{r}
LL	(Chile) A Tabilo	6	2	4

Quarterfinals
WC	(Denmark) H Rune	6	6
(Finland) E Ruusuvuori	0	2
(Germany) O Otte	6	7^{7}
LL	(Chile) A Tabilo	1	6^{1}

Semifinals
WC	(Denmark) H Rune	6	6
(Germany) O Otte	4	4

=== Bottom half ===
First round
7	(Serbia) M Kecmanović	6	6
WC	(Germany) MH Rehberg	2	3
WC	(Germany) P Kohlschreiber	6^{5}	6	1
(Germany) D Altmaier	7^{7}	3	6
(United States) M McDonald	4	6	3
I Ivashka	6	3	6
8	(Netherlands) B van de Zandschulp	7^{7}	6
(United States) B Nakashima	6^{3}	3
Q	E Gerasimov	4	6	6
(Australia) J Millman	6	2	2
LL	(Slovakia) N Gombos	1	6	6^{7}
(Slovakia) A Molčan	6	3	7^{9}

Second round
7	(Serbia) M Kecmanović	6	6
(Germany) D Altmaier	2	4
I Ivashka	6	2	4
4	(Georgia (country)) N Basilashvili	3	6	6
8	(Netherlands) B van de Zandschulp	6	6
Q	E Gerasimov	2	3
(Slovakia) A Molčan	6	4	4
2	(Norway) C Ruud	3	6	6

Quarterfinals
7	(Serbia) M Kecmanović	7^{7}	6
4	(Georgia (country)) N Basilashvili	6^{5}	2
8	(Netherlands) B van de Zandschulp	7	6
2	(Norway) C Ruud	5	1

Semifinals
7	(Serbia) M Kecmanović	6	6^{4}	4
8	(Netherlands) B van de Zandschulp	2	7^{7}	6

== Qualifying ==
=== Seeds ===
1. (Argentina) Francisco Cerúndolo (first round)
2. (Japan) Yoshihito Nishioka (qualified)
3. (Chile) Alejandro Tabilo (qualifying competition, lucky loser)
4. (Switzerland) Henri Laaksonen (first round)
5. (Czech Republic) Jiří Lehečka (qualified)
6. (Slovakia) Norbert Gombos (qualifying competition, lucky loser)
7. (Brazil) Thiago Monteiro (qualifying competition)
8. (Germany) Yannick Hanfmann (qualifying competition)

=== Qualifiers ===
1. Egor Gerasimov
2. (Japan) Yoshihito Nishioka
3. (Czech Republic) Jiří Lehečka
4. (Serbia) Marko Topo

=== Lucky losers ===
1. (Slovakia) Norbert Gombos
2. (Chile) Alejandro Tabilo

=== Draw ===
==== First qualifier ====
First round
1	(Argentina) Francisco Cerúndolo	6^{6}	1
Egor Gerasimov	7^{8}	6
Alt	(Kazakhstan) Mikhail Kukushkin	3	4
7	(Brazil) Thiago Monteiro	6	6

Qualifying competition
Egor Gerasimov	6	6
7	(Brazil) Thiago Monteiro	1	1

==== Second qualifier ====
First round
2	(Japan) Yoshihito Nishioka	6	6
Alt	(Germany) Maximilian Marterer	2	2
(Sweden) Elias Ymer	3	4
8	(Germany) Yannick Hanfmann	6	6

Qualifying competition
2	(Japan) Yoshihito Nishioka	7	6^{5}	6
8	(Germany) Yannick Hanfmann	5	7^{7}	4

==== Third qualifier ====
First round
3	(Chile) Alejandro Tabilo	5	7	6
Alt	(France) Geoffrey Blancaneaux	7	5	3
(Bosnia and Herzegovina) Damir Džumhur	4	7^{7}	5
5	(Czech Republic) Jiří Lehečka	6	6^{2}	7

Qualifying competition
3	(Chile) Alejandro Tabilo	4	6^{3}
5	(Czech Republic) Jiří Lehečka	6	7^{7}

==== Fourth qualifier ====
First round
4	(Switzerland) Henri Laaksonen	4	2
WC	(Serbia) Marko Topo	6	6
WC	(Germany) Daniel Masur	7^{7}	5	4
6	(Slovakia) Norbert Gombos	6^{5}	7	6

Qualifying competition
WC	(Serbia) Marko Topo	3	6	6
6	(Slovakia) Norbert Gombos	6	3	1
