= 2021 BMW Open – Doubles =

Doubles
- 2021 BMW Open

Final
- Champions: (Netherlands) Wesley Koolhof; (Germany) Kevin Krawietz
- Runners-up: (Belgium) Sander Gillé; (Belgium) Joran Vliegen
- Score: 4–6, 6–4, [10–5]

Events
Singles	Doubles
← 2019 ·	BMW Open	· 2022 →

Wesley Koolhof and Kevin Krawietz defeated Sander Gillé and Joran Vliegen in the final, 4–6, 6–4, [10–5], to win the doubles title at the 2021 Bavarian International Tennis Championships. It was Koolhof's seventh individual career ATP Tour doubles title and Krawietz's fifth.

Frederik Nielsen and Tim Pütz were the defending champions from when the tournament was last held in 2019, but they competed at the simultaneous Estoril Open instead.

== Seeds ==
1. (Netherlands) Wesley Koolhof / (Germany) Kevin Krawietz (champions)
2. (Australia) John Peers / (Australia) Luke Saville (quarterfinals)
3. (Belgium) Sander Gillé / (Belgium) Joran Vliegen (final)
4. (New Zealand) Marcus Daniell / (Austria) Philipp Oswald (quarterfinals)

== Draw ==
=== Key ===
- Q = Qualifier
- WC = Wild card
- LL = Lucky loser
- Alt = Alternate
- ITF = ITF entry
- PR = Protected ranking
- SR = Special ranking
- SE = Special exempt
- JE = Junior exempt
- JR = Junior Accelerator Programme entrant
- CO = College Accelerator Programme entrant
- NG = Next Gen Accelerator Program entrant
- w/o = Walkover
- r = Retired
- d = Defaulted

=== Draw ===
First round

Quarterfinals

Semifinals

Final

1
(Netherlands) W Koolhof
(Germany) K Krawietz
6
6

WC
- (Brazil) M Melo
- (Germany) M Zverev
3
3

1
(Netherlands) W Koolhof
(Germany) K Krawietz
6
6

- (Bosnia and Herzegovina) T Brkić
- (Serbia) N Ćaćić
6^{3}
6^{5}

- (Australia) M Ebden
- (Australia) J-P Smith
4
3

(Australia) M Ebden
(Australia) J-P Smith
7^{7}
7^{7}

1
(Netherlands) W Koolhof
(Germany) K Krawietz
w/o

4
(New Zealand) M Daniell
(Austria) P Oswald
6
7

- (Germany) Y Hanfmann
- (Germany) D Koepfer

- (Georgia (country)) N Basilashvili
- (Germany) A Begemann
2
5

4
- (New Zealand) M Daniell
- (Austria) P Oswald
6^{1}
4

(Germany) Y Hanfmann
(Germany) D Koepfer
6^{4}
7
[10]

(Germany) Y Hanfmann
(Germany) D Koepfer
7^{7}
6

- (Ukraine) D Molchanov
- (Croatia) F Škugor
7^{7}
5
[5]

1
(Netherlands) W Koolhof
(Germany) K Krawietz
4
6
[10]

- (Kazakhstan) A Golubev
- (Italy) A Vavassori
4
6
[8]

3
- (Belgium) S Gillé
- (Belgium) J Vliegen
6
4
[5]

(Argentina) F Coria
(Argentina) G Pella
6
3
[10]

- (Argentina) F Coria
- (Argentina) G Pella

- (Israel) J Erlich
- (India) D Sharan
3
2

3
(Belgium) S Gillé
(Belgium) J Vliegen
w/o

3
(Belgium) S Gillé
(Belgium) J Vliegen
6
6

3
(Belgium) S Gillé
(Belgium) J Vliegen
6
6^{2}
[13]

- (United Kingdom) J O'Mara
- (Pakistan) A-u-H Qureshi

WC
- (Germany) D Brown
- (Germany) P Gojowczyk
3
7^{7}
[11]

WC
(Germany) D Brown
(Germany) P Gojowczyk
w/o

WC
(Germany) D Brown
(Germany) P Gojowczyk
6
6

- (Finland) H Heliövaara
- (Finland) E Ruusuvuori
3
4

2
- (Australia) J Peers
- (Australia) L Saville
4
2

2
(Australia) J Peers
(Australia) L Saville
6
6
