= 2017 BMW Open =

- Date: 1–7 May
- Edition: 101st
- Category: ATP World Tour 250 series
- Draw: 28S / 16D
- Prize money: €482,060
- Surface: Clay / outdoor
- Location: Munich, Germany
- Venue: MTTC Iphitos

Champions

Singles
- (Germany) Alexander Zverev

Doubles
- (Colombia) Juan Sebastián Cabal / (Colombia) Robert Farah
← 2016 ·	BMW Open	· 2018 →

The 2017 BMW Open was a men's tennis tournament played on outdoor clay courts. It was the 102nd edition of the event, and part of the ATP World Tour 250 series of the 2017 ATP World Tour. It took place at the MTTC Iphitos complex in Munich, Germany, from 1 May until 7 May 2017. Third-seeded Alexander Zverev won the singles title.

== Finals ==
=== Singles ===
- (Germany) Alexander Zverev defeated (Argentina) Guido Pella 6–4, 6–3.

=== Doubles ===
- (Colombia) Juan Sebastián Cabal / (Colombia) Robert Farah defeated (France) Jérémy Chardy / (France) Fabrice Martin 6–3, 6–3.

== Singles main-draw entrants ==
=== Seeds ===
Country	Player	Rank^{1}	Seed
FRA	Gaël Monfils	17	1
ESP	Roberto Bautista Agut	18	2
GER	Alexander Zverev	21	3
ITA	Fabio Fognini	29	4
GER	Philipp Kohlschreiber	31	5
GER	Mischa Zverev	35	6
GER	Jan-Lennard Struff	52	7
BRA	Thomaz Bellucci	54	8

- Rankings are as of April 24, 2017.

=== Other entrants ===
The following players received wildcards into the main draw:

- (Germany) Maximilian Marterer
- (Germany) Daniel Masur
- (Norway) Casper Ruud

The following players received entry using a protected ranking into the main draw:

- (Germany) Tommy Haas

The following players received entry from the qualifying draw:

- (Germany) Yannick Hanfmann
- (Slovakia) Jozef Kovalík
- (Argentina) Guido Pella
- (Germany) Cedrik-Marcel Stebe

=== Withdrawals ===
Before the tournament

- (France) Adrian Mannarino →replaced by (Argentina) Nicolás Kicker
- (United States) Donald Young →replaced by (South Korea) Chung Hyeon
- (Germany) Florian Mayer (late withdrawal) →replaced by (Ukraine) Sergiy Stakhovsky

== Doubles main-draw entrants ==
=== Seeds ===
Country	Player	Country	Player	Rank^{1}	Seed
AUT	Oliver Marach	CRO	Mate Pavić	65	1
PHI	Treat Huey	BLR	Max Mirnyi	69	2
COL	Juan Sebastián Cabal	COL	Robert Farah	76	3
CHI	Julio Peralta	ARG	Horacio Zeballos	87	4

- Rankings are as of April 24, 2017.

=== Other entrants ===
The following pairs received wildcards into the doubles main draw:

- (Germany) Matthias Bachinger / (Germany) Maximilian Marterer
- (Germany) Gero Kretschmer / (Germany) Alexander Satschko
