= 2022 BMW Open – Doubles =

Doubles
- 2022 BMW Open

Final
- Champions: (Germany) Kevin Krawietz (Germany) Andreas Mies
- Runners-up: (Brazil) Rafael Matos (Spain) David Vega Hernández
- Score: 4–6, 6–4, [10–7]

Events
Singles	Doubles
← 2021 ·	BMW Open	· 2023 →

Defending champion Kevin Krawietz and his partner Andreas Mies defeated Rafael Matos and David Vega Hernández in the final, 4–6, 6–4, [10–7] to win the doubles tennis title at the 2022 Bavarian International Tennis Championships. It was their sixth career ATP doubles title together as a team.

Krawietz and Wesley Koolhof and were the defending champions, but Koolhof did not return to compete.

== Seeds ==
1. (Croatia) Nikola Mektić / (Croatia) Mate Pavić (first round)
2. (Australia) John Peers / (Slovakia) Filip Polášek (quarterfinals)
3. (Germany) Kevin Krawietz / (Germany) Andreas Mies (champions)
4. (India) Rohan Bopanna / (Netherlands) Matwé Middelkoop (quarterfinals)

== Draw ==
=== Key ===
- Q = Qualifier
- WC = Wild card
- LL = Lucky loser
- Alt = Alternate
- ITF = ITF entry
- PR = Protected ranking
- SR = Special ranking
- SE = Special exempt
- JE = Junior exempt
- JR = Junior Accelerator Programme entrant
- CO = College Accelerator Programme entrant
- NG = Next Gen Accelerator Program entrant
- w/o = Walkover
- r = Retired
- d = Defaulted

=== Draw ===
First round
1	(Croatia) N Mektić (Croatia) M Pavić	4	5
(Kazakhstan) A Golubev (France) F Martin	6	7
(Serbia) I Sabanov (Serbia) M Sabanov	6	6
PR	(Chile) J Peralta (Croatia) F Škugor	3	2
4	(India) R Bopanna (Netherlands) M Middelkoop	6	6
WC	(Germany) P Kohlschreiber (Germany) MH Rehberg	1	4
(Brazil) R Matos (Spain) D Vega Hernández	5	6	[12]
(Germany) D Altmaier (Germany) O Otte	7	2	[10]
(Czech Republic) R Jebavý (Argentina) A Molteni	6	6
Alt	(Germany) P Florig (Germany) M Homberg	0	2
(Mexico) H Hach Verdugo (Austria) P Oswald	4	7^{10}	[6]
3	(Germany) K Krawietz (Germany) A Mies	6	6^{8}	[10]
Alt	(Romania) VV Cornea (Greece) Pe Tsitsipas	4	1
(United Kingdom) L Glasspool (Finland) H Heliövaara	6	6
WC	(Germany) Y Hanfmann (Germany) D Masur
2	(Australia) J Peers (Slovakia) F Polášek	w/o

Quarterfinals
(Kazakhstan) A Golubev (France) F Martin	6	7
(Serbia) I Sabanov (Serbia) M Sabanov	3	5
4	(India) R Bopanna (Netherlands) M Middelkoop	3	4
(Brazil) R Matos (Spain) D Vega Hernández	6	6
(Czech Republic) R Jebavý (Argentina) A Molteni	2	2
3	(Germany) K Krawietz (Germany) A Mies	6	6
(United Kingdom) L Glasspool (Finland) H Heliövaara	7^{7}	7^{8}
2	(Australia) J Peers (Slovakia) F Polášek	6^{1}	6^{6}

Semifinals
(Kazakhstan) A Golubev (France) F Martin	6^{1}	6^{2}
(Brazil) R Matos (Spain) D Vega Hernández	7^{7}	7^{7}
3	(Germany) K Krawietz (Germany) A Mies	7	6
(United Kingdom) L Glasspool (Finland) H Heliövaara	5	3

Final
(Brazil) R Matos (Spain) D Vega Hernández	6	4	[7]
3	(Germany) K Krawietz (Germany) A Mies	4	6	[10]
