= 2019 BMW Open – Singles =

Singles
- 2019 BMW Open

Final
- Champion: (Chile) Cristian Garín
- Runner-up: (Italy) Matteo Berrettini
- Score: 6–1, 3–6, 7–6^{(7–1)}

Details
- Draw: 28 (4 Q / 3 WC )
- Seeds: 8

Events
| Singles | Doubles |
| ← 2018 · | BMW Open | · 2021 → |

Alexander Zverev was the two-time defending champion, but lost to Cristian Garín in the quarterfinals.

Garín went on to win the title, defeating Matteo Berrettini in the final, 6–1, 3–6, 7–6^{(7–1)}.

== Seeds ==
The top four seeds received a bye into the second round.

1. (Germany) Alexander Zverev (quarterfinals)
2. (Russia) Karen Khachanov (second round)
3. (Italy) Marco Cecchinato (semifinals)
4. (Spain) Roberto Bautista Agut (semifinals)
5. (United Kingdom) Kyle Edmund (first round)
6. (Argentina) Diego Schwartzman (second round)
7. (Argentina) Guido Pella (quarterfinals)
8. (Hungary) Márton Fucsovics (quarterfinals)

== Draw ==
=== Key ===
- Q = Qualifier
- WC = Wild card
- LL = Lucky loser
- Alt = Alternate
- ITF = ITF entry
- PR = Protected ranking
- SR = Special ranking
- SE = Special exempt
- JE = Junior exempt
- JR = Junior Accelerator Programme entrant
- CO = College Accelerator Programme entrant
- NG = Next Gen Accelerator Program entrant
- w/o = Walkover
- r = Retired
- d = Defaulted

=== Finals ===
Semifinals
(Chile) Cristian Garín | 6 | 6
3 | (Italy) Marco Cecchinato | 2 | 4
4 | (Spain) Roberto Bautista Agut | 4 | 2
(Italy) Matteo Berrettini | 6 | 6

Final
(Chile) Cristian Garín | 6 | 3 | 7^{7}
(Italy) Matteo Berrettini | 1 | 6 | 6^{1}

=== Top half ===
First round
WC | (Germany) M Marterer | 2 | 6 | 2
(Argentina) JI Londero | 6 | 4 | 6
(Chile) C Garín | 6 | 6
Q | (Germany) Y Maden | 4 | 2
(France) B Paire | 4 | 6 | 1
6 | (Argentina) D Schwartzman | 6 | 1 | 6
(Latvia) E Gulbis | 3 | 5
(Slovakia) M Kližan | 6 | 7
Q | (Brazil) T Monteiro | 6 | 6
(Germany) J-L Struff | 1 | 1
Q | (Italy) L Sonego | 5 | 6 | 6^{8}
8 | (Hungary) M Fucsovics | 7 | 4 | 7^{10}

Second round
1 | (Germany) A Zverev | 7 | 6
(Argentina) JI Londero | 5 | 1
(Chile) C Garín | 6 | 7
6 | (Argentina) D Schwartzman | 1 | 5
3 | (Italy) M Cecchinato | 6 | 6
(Slovakia) M Kližan | 1 | 3
Q | (Brazil) T Monteiro | 7^{7} | 4 | 3
8 | (Hungary) M Fucsovics | 6^{1} | 6 | 6

Quarterfinals
1 | (Germany) A Zverev | 4 | 7 | 5
(Chile) C Garín | 6 | 5 | 7
3 | (Italy) M Cecchinato | 1 | 7 | 7
8 | (Hungary) M Fucsovics | 6 | 5 | 5

Semifinals
(Chile) C Garín | 6 | 6
3 | (Italy) M Cecchinato | 2 | 4

=== Bottom half ===
First round
7 | (Argentina) G Pella | 6 | 6
(Germany) M Zverev | 2 | 1
(Japan) T Daniel | 6 | 6
(France) U Humbert | 4 | 4
WC | (Germany) R Molleker | 7^{7} | 4 | 6
(Romania) M Copil | 6^{5} | 6 | 4
5 | (United Kingdom) K Edmund | 4 | 3
(United States) D Kudla | 6 | 6
(Italy) M Berrettini | 7^{7} | 6
Q | (Uzbekistan) D Istomin | 6^{5} | 3
(Germany) P Kohlschreiber | 6 | 7
(Italy) A Seppi | 2 | 5

Second round
7 | (Argentina) G Pella | 6 | 6^{7} | 6
(Japan) T Daniel | 1 | 7^{9} | 3
WC | (Germany) R Molleker | 4 | 2
4 | (Spain) R Bautista Agut | 6 | 6
(United States) D Kudla | 5 | 3
(Italy) M Berrettini | 7 | 6
(Germany) P Kohlschreiber | 7^{8} | 6
2/WC | (Russia) K Khachanov | 6^{6} | 4

Quarterfinals
7 | (Argentina) G Pella | 6 | 4 | 0
4 | (Spain) R Bautista Agut | 4 | 6 | 6
(Italy) M Berrettini | 4 | 7 | 6
(Germany) P Kohlschreiber | 6 | 5 | 4

Semifinals
4 | (Spain) R Bautista Agut | 4 | 2
(Italy) M Berrettini | 6 | 6

== Qualifying ==
=== Seeds ===
1. (Italy) Lorenzo Sonego (qualified)
2. (India) Prajnesh Gunneswaran (qualifying competition)
3. (Spain) Albert Ramos Viñolas (first round)
4. (Germany) Peter Gojowczyk (first round)
5. (Serbia) Miomir Kecmanović (first round)
6. (Russia) Andrey Rublev (qualifying competition)
7. (Italy) Thomas Fabbiano (first round)
8. (Uzbekistan) Denis Istomin (qualified)

=== Qualifiers ===
1. (Italy) Lorenzo Sonego
2. (Uzbekistan) Denis Istomin
3. (Brazil) Thiago Monteiro
4. (Germany) Yannick Maden

=== Qualifying draw ===
==== First qualifier ====
First round
1 | (Italy) Lorenzo Sonego | 7^{7} | 6^{5} | 6
(Germany) Yannick Hanfmann | 6^{5} | 7^{7} | 3
(Switzerland) Henri Laaksonen | 4 | 6 | 6
5 | (Serbia) Miomir Kecmanović | 6 | 1 | 4

Qualifying competition
1 | (Italy) Lorenzo Sonego | 6 | 5 | 7^{7}
(Switzerland) Henri Laaksonen | 0 | 7 | 6^{4}

==== Second qualifier ====
First round
2 | (India) Prajnesh Gunneswaran | 3 | 7^{7} | 7
WC | (Austria) Alexander Erler | 6 | 6^{5} | 5
WC | (Germany) Cedrik-Marcel Stebe | 3 | 6^{5}
8 | (Uzbekistan) Denis Istomin | 6 | 7^{7}

Qualifying competition
2 | (India) Prajnesh Gunneswaran | 6 | 2 | 2
8 | (Uzbekistan) Denis Istomin | 4 | 6 | 6

==== Third qualifier ====
First round
3 | (Spain) Albert Ramos Viñolas | 3 | 6 | 2
(Brazil) Thiago Monteiro | 6 | 2 | 6
(Germany) Matthias Bachinger | 6^{1} | 2
6 | (Russia) Andrey Rublev | 7^{7} | 6

Qualifying competition
(Brazil) Thiago Monteiro | 6 | 6^{6} | 6
6 | (Russia) Andrey Rublev | 3 | 7^{8} | 4

==== Fourth qualifier ====
First round
4 | (Germany) Peter Gojowczyk | 4 | 6 | 4
(Czech Republic) Lukáš Rosol | 6 | 2 | 6
(Germany) Yannick Maden | 4 | 6 | 6
7 | (Italy) Thomas Fabbiano | 6 | 2 | 2

Qualifying competition
(Czech Republic) Lukáš Rosol | 2 | 2
(Germany) Yannick Maden | 6 | 6
