= 2016 BMW Open – Singles =

Singles
- 2016 BMW Open

Final
- Champion: (Germany) Philipp Kohlschreiber
- Runner-up: (Austria) Dominic Thiem
- Score: 7–6^{(9–7)}, 4–6, 7–6^{(7–4)}

Details
- Draw: 28 (4 Q / 3 WC )
- Seeds: 8

Events
Singles	Doubles
- BMW Open

Andy Murray was the defending champion, but chose not to participate this year.

Philipp Kohlschreiber won the title, defeating Dominic Thiem in the final, 7–6^{(9–7)}, 4–6, 7–6^{(7–4)}.

== Seeds ==
The top four seeds receive a bye into the second round.

1. (Belgium) David Goffin (quarterfinals)
2. (France) Gaël Monfils (withdrew)
3. (Austria) Dominic Thiem (final)
4. (Germany) Philipp Kohlschreiber (champion)
5. (Italy) Fabio Fognini (semifinals)
6. (Brazil) Thomaz Bellucci (second round)
7. (Canada) Vasek Pospisil (first round)
8. (Germany) Alexander Zverev (semifinals)

== Draw ==
Key

- Q = Qualifier
- WC = Wild card
- LL = Lucky loser
- Alt = Alternate
- ITF = ITF entry
- PR = Protected ranking
- SR = Special ranking
- SE = Special exempt
- JE = Junior exempt
- JR = Junior Accelerator Programme entrant
- CO = College Accelerator Programme entrant
- NG = Next Gen Accelerator Program entrant
- w/o = Walkover
- r = Retired
- d = Defaulted

=== Finals ===
Semifinals
8	(Germany) Alexander Zverev	6	2	3
3	(Austria) Dominic Thiem	4	6	6
4	(Germany) Philipp Kohlschreiber	6	6
5	(Italy) Fabio Fognini	1	4

Final
3	(Austria) Dominic Thiem	6^{7}	6	6^{4}
4	(Germany) Philipp Kohlschreiber	7^{9}	4	7^{7}

=== Top half ===
First round
Q	(Germany) C-M Stebe	5	2
(Dominican Republic) V Estrella Burgos	7	6
(Czech Republic) L Rosol	6^{2}	6	7^{7}
(Uzbekistan) D Istomin	7^{7}	4	6^{2}
(Tunisia) M Jaziri	6	3	2
8	(Germany) A Zverev	4	6	6
WC	(Germany) M Zverev	5	6
(Colombia) S Giraldo	7	7
(Croatia) I Dodig	7^{7}	6
(Latvia) E Gulbis	6^{3}	2
(Russia) M Youzhny	3	0^{r}
6	(Brazil) T Bellucci	6	1

Second round
1	(Belgium) D Goffin	5	6	6
(Dominican Republic) V Estrella Burgos	7	3	2
(Czech Republic) L Rosol	3	4
8	(Germany) A Zverev	6	6
3	(Austria) D Thiem	7	6
(Colombia) S Giraldo	5	4
(Croatia) I Dodig	7^{7}	6
6	(Brazil) T Bellucci	6^{5}	3

Quarterfinals
1	(Belgium) D Goffin	3	6	3
8	(Germany) A Zverev	6	4	6
3	(Austria) D Thiem	6	4	6
(Croatia) I Dodig	4	6	3

Semifinals
8	(Germany) A Zverev	6	2	3
3	(Austria) D Thiem	4	6	6

=== Bottom half ===
First round
7	(Canada) V Pospisil	7^{7}	3	2
(Germany) J-L Struff	6^{5}	6	6
WC	(Argentina) JM del Potro	7^{7}	6
(Germany) D Brown	6^{2}	4
Q	(Germany) M Bachinger	4	4
Q	(Germany) F Mayer	6	6
5	(Italy) F Fognini	6	6
WC	(Germany) M Marterer	3	1
(Kazakhstan) M Kukushkin	6	3
(Russia) E Donskoy	2	0^{r}
(Italy) M Cecchinato	2	4
Q	(Netherlands) I Sijsling	6	6

Second round
(Germany) J-L Struff	2	6	3
WC	(Argentina) JM del Potro	6	3	6
Q	(Germany) F Mayer	3	2
4	(Germany) P Kohlschreiber	6	6
5	(Italy) F Fognini	6	7
(Kazakhstan) M Kukushkin	3	5
Q	(Netherlands) I Sijsling	3	4
LL	(Slovakia) J Kovalík	6	6

Quarterfinals
WC	(Argentina) JM del Potro	4	1
4	(Germany) P Kohlschreiber	6	6
5	(Italy) F Fognini	6	3	7
LL	(Slovakia) J Kovalík	2	6	5

Semifinals
4	(Germany) P Kohlschreiber	6	6
5	(Italy) F Fognini	1	4

== Qualifying ==
=== Seeds ===
1. (Bosnia and Herzegovina) Mirza Bašić (first round)
2. (Netherlands) Igor Sijsling (qualified)
3. (Germany) Daniel Brands (first round)
4. (Colombia) Alejandro González (first round)
5. (Slovakia) Jozef Kovalík (qualifying competition, lucky loser)
6. (France) Vincent Millot (qualifying competition)
7. (Germany) Tobias Kamke (qualifying competition)
8. (Germany) Peter Gojowczyk (first round)

=== Qualifiers ===
1. (Germany) Cedrik-Marcel Stebe
2. (Netherlands) Igor Sijsling
3. (Germany) Matthias Bachinger
4. (Germany) Florian Mayer

=== Lucky loser ===
1. (Slovakia) Jozef Kovalík

=== Qualifying draw ===
==== First qualifier ====
First round
1	(Bosnia and Herzegovina) Mirza Bašić	4	3
(Germany) Nils Langer	6	6
WC	(Germany) Cedrik-Marcel Stebe	6	7^{7}
8	(Germany) Peter Gojowczyk	1	6^{5}

Qualifying competition
(Germany) Nils Langer	6	6^{2}	4
WC	(Germany) Cedrik-Marcel Stebe	2	7^{7}	6

==== Second qualifier ====
First round
2	(Netherlands) Igor Sijsling	6	6
(Kazakhstan) Andrey Golubev	2	1
WC	(Austria) Alexander Erler	3	3
5	(Slovakia) Jozef Kovalík	6	6

Qualifying competition
2	(Netherlands) Igor Sijsling	7^{7}	6
5	(Slovakia) Jozef Kovalík	6^{4}	3

==== Third qualifier ====
First round
3	(Germany) Daniel Brands	3	4
WC	(Germany) Matthias Bachinger	6	6
(Spain) Adrián Menéndez Maceiras	6	5	3
7	(Germany) Tobias Kamke	3	7	6

Qualifying competition
WC	(Germany) Matthias Bachinger	7	6
7	(Germany) Tobias Kamke	5	1

==== Fourth qualifier ====
First round
4	(Colombia) Alejandro González	2	4
Alt	(Germany) Florian Mayer	6	6
Alt	(Croatia) Nikola Mektić	2	4
6	(France) Vincent Millot	6	6

Qualifying competition
Alt	(Germany) Florian Mayer	7	4	6
6	(France) Vincent Millot	5	6	4
