= Kevin Krawietz =

German tennis player

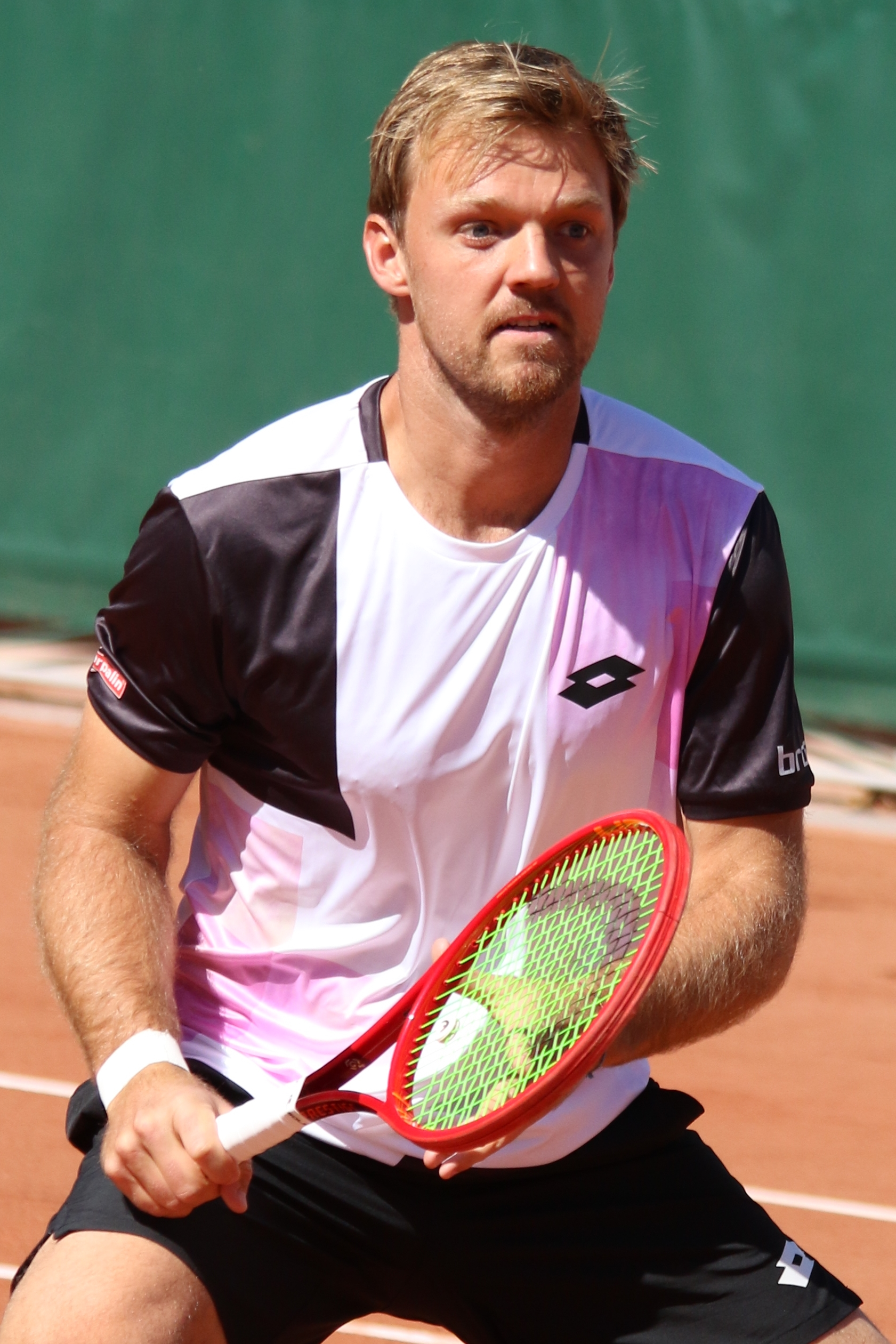
- Krawietz at the 2021 French Open
- Country (sports): Germany
- Residence: Munich, Germany
- Born: 24 January 1992 (age 34) Coburg, Germany
- Height: 1.88 m (6 ft 2 in)
- Turned pro: 2010
- Plays: Right-handed (two-handed backhand)
- Coach: Lukas Wolff
- Prize money: US $6,429,336

Singles
- Career record: 1–5
- Career titles: 0
- Highest ranking: No. 211 (17 December 2018)

Grand Slam singles results
- Australian Open: Q1 (2019)
- French Open: Q1 (2019)

Doubles
- Career record: 295–176
- Career titles: 15
- Highest ranking: No. 5 (10 February 2025)
- Current ranking: No. 11 (19 October 2026)

Grand Slam doubles results
- Australian Open: SF (2025)
- French Open: W (2019, 2020)
- Wimbledon: SF (2023, 2026)
- US Open: F (2024, 2026)

Other doubles tournaments
- Tour Finals: W (2024)
- Olympic Games: QF (2024)

Grand Slam mixed doubles results
- Australian Open: QF (2024, 2025)
- French Open: SF (2022)
- Wimbledon: SF (2021)
- US Open: 2R (2022, 2023)

Other mixed doubles tournaments
- Olympic Games: QF (2021)

Team competitions
- Davis Cup: SF (2021, 2024, 2025)
- Last updated on: 20 October 2026.

Kevin Krawietz (born 24 January 1992) is a German professional tennis player who specializes in doubles. He achieved his career-high doubles ranking of world No. 5 on 10 February 2025. Krawietz has won twelve doubles titles on the ATP Tour, including the 2024 ATP Finals with Tim Pütz, becoming the first all-German pair to win the title. He is a two-time Grand Slam champion at the French Open in 2019 and 2020 with Andreas Mies.

Krawietz was also a finalist with Tim Pütz at the 2024 US Open and reached the mixed doubles semifinals at the 2021 Wimbledon Championships and at the 2022 French Open, partnering Květa Peschke and Nicole Melichar-Martinez respectively.

In singles, Krawietz reached his highest ranking of world No. 211 in December 2018. He has represented Germany in the Davis Cup since 2019, and also competed at the 2020 Olympic Games in men's and mixed doubles and 2024 Olympic Games in men's doubles.

== Junior career ==
In Juniors, Krawietz won one junior Grand Slam title, the 2009 Wimbledon Championships – Boys' doubles tournament.

== Professional career ==
=== 2009–2017: ATP debut ===
Krawietz made his ATP debut at the 2009 German Open as a wildcard. He lost to Jan Hernych in the first round in three sets. In 2010 Krawietz received a wildcard for the Bavarian Championships in Munich, where he lost to Tomáš Berdych in the first round in straight sets. Through 2017 Krawietz played mainly on the ITF Circuit and the ATP Challenger Tour. In 2015, he won his first Challenger doubles title at the Morocco Challenger in Meknes, partnering with Maximilian Marterer.

=== 2018–2020: Consecutive French Open titles, world No. 7 ===
Krawietz reached the third round at the 2018 Wimbledon Championships in doubles with partner Andreas Mies as a qualifier, where they lost to the later champions Mike Bryan and Jack Sock despite having two match points.

Krawietz won his first doubles title on the ATP Tour at the 2019 New York Open, again with Mies. He and Mies then won the 2019 French Open doubles title as unseeded players, defeating the French duo Jérémy Chardy and Fabrice Martin in the final. This victory made them the first all-German team in the Open Era to win a Grand Slam title, and the first since Gottfried von Cramm and Henner Henkel in 1937.

He won his first main draw singles match on the ATP Tour as a qualifier at the Antalya Open, defeating wildcard Cem İlkel in the first round. At the 2019 US Open, he and Mies reached the semifinals. They won their third title at the 2019 European Open in Antwerp.

In 2020, Krawietz and Mies successfully defended their French Open title, defeating Mate Pavić and Bruno Soares in straight sets in the final. After winning the title twice, they have not yet lost a match at the French Open as a pair.

=== 2021–2022: Four doubles titles, partnership changes ===
In 2021 Krawietz won his fifth doubles title at the Bavarian Championships in Munich, partnering Wesley Koolhof. For the French Open, he teamed up with Horia Tecău. As a twice defending champion he extended his unbeaten run to 15 wins before finally suffering his first French Open defeat in a quarterfinal loss. He and Tecău won the 2021 Halle Open, which was his first title at an ATP 500 tournament, and his first on grass.

At the 2022 Barcelona Open, Krawietz won the title, joining up with Mies. Within a week, they also won the title on home soil in Munich. At the French Open, he lost his first doubles match at the tournament when he and Mies suffered an upset loss in the first round.

=== 2023: New partnership with Putz, Wimbledon semifinal ===
In March, partnering with Fabrice Martin, he reached the semifinals of the Miami Open.

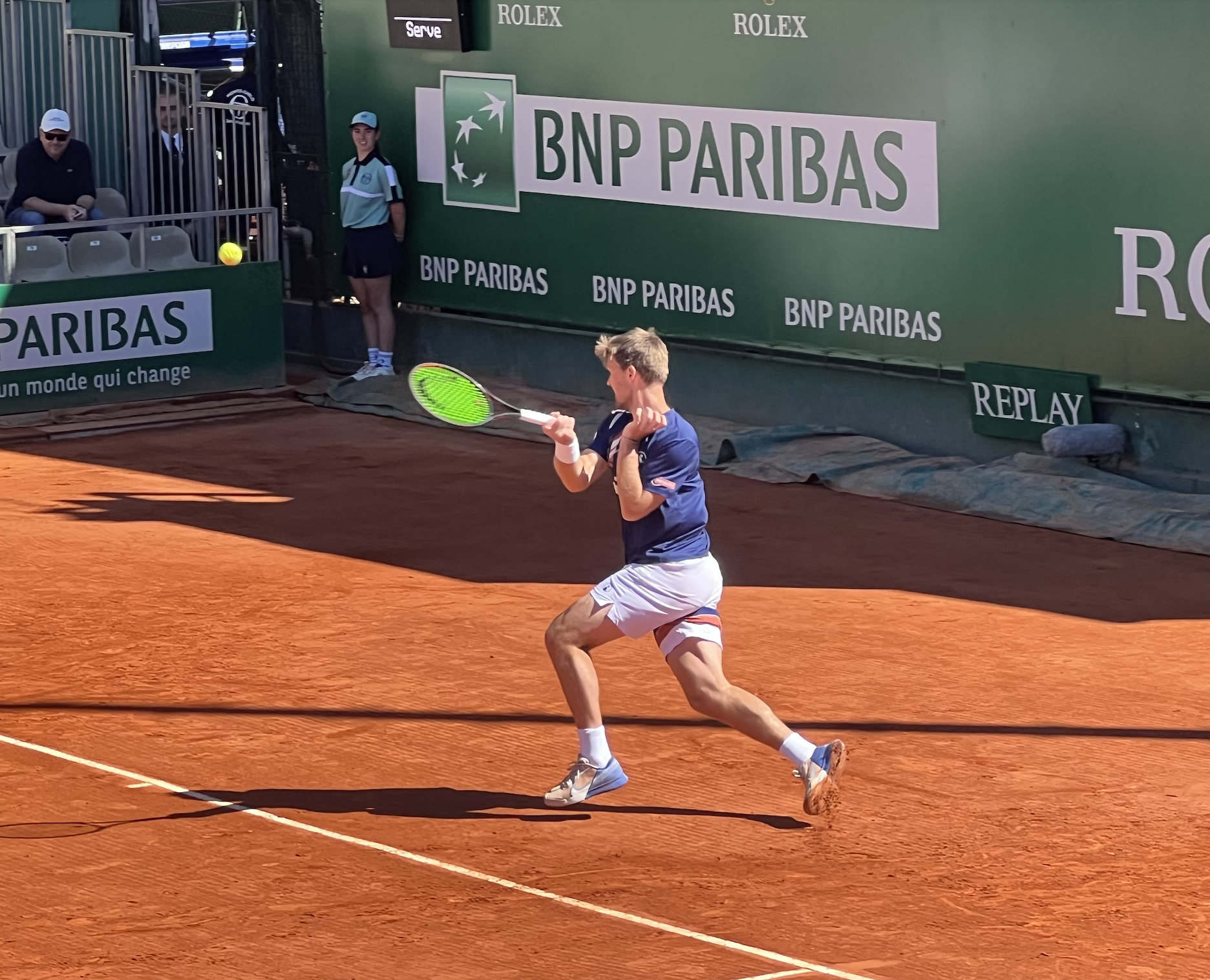
Krawietz on his way to a Monte-Carlo semifinal in 2023.

He reached the semifinals of the 2023 Monte-Carlo Masters and for the fourth time the quarterfinals of the 2023 French Open with his new partner Tim Pütz, with a win over Romain Arneodo and Sam Weissborn, getting revenge for their loss to the same duo in Monte-Carlo six weeks earlier. They lost to eventual champions Ivan Dodig and Austin Krajicek in three sets.

He reached the semifinals for the first time at the Wimbledon Championships with Pütz. The same month, they won their first title together at the Hamburg European Open.

=== 2024: US Open finalist and ATP Finals champion ===
At the Australian Open, he reached the quarterfinals for the first time at this tournament with Pütz. The pair also reached the semifinals at the Indian Wells Open where they lost to unseeded pair and eventual champions Wesley Koolhof/Nikola Mektić. At the Miami Open they lost also in the semifinals to second seeds Austin Krajicek/Ivan Dodig. Next they reached the quarterfinals at the Monte-Carlo Masters where they lost again to the eventual champions and also unseeded pair of Joran Vliegen and Sander Gillé.

He reached his third major final with Pütz at the US Open defeating fifth seeds Andrea Vavassori and Simone Bolelli, 16th seeds Máximo González and Andrés Molteni and fourth seeds Marcelo Arévalo and Mate Pavić in the semifinals. At the 2024 ATP Finals with Pütz, he reached the semifinals defeating Simone Bolelli and Andrea Vavassori. They became the first all-German duo to reach the semifinals and then the final in ATP Finals history. They also became the first No. 8 seeds to reach the doubles final, which they won in straight sets against Marcelo Arévalo and Mate Pavić.

=== 2025: Masters title, world No. 5 ===
Krawietz and Pütz reached the final at the Adelaide International, losing to Simone Bolelli and Andrea Vavassori in a deciding champions tiebreak. He won his first ATP Masters 1000 title at the Shanghai Masters, again with Pütz.

== Performance timelines ==
Key
W	F	SF	QF	#R	RR	Q#	P#	DNQ	A	Z#	PO	G	S	B	NMS	NTI	P	NH

(W) winner; (F) finalist; (SF) semifinalist; (QF) quarterfinalist; (#R) rounds 4, 3, 2, 1; (RR) round-robin stage; (Q#) qualification round; (P#) preliminary round; (DNQ) did not qualify; (A) absent; (Z#) Davis/Fed Cup Zonal Group (with number indication) or (PO) play-off; (G) gold, (S) silver or (B) bronze Olympic/Paralympic medal; (NMS) not a Masters tournament; (NTI) not a Tier I tournament; (P) postponed; (NH) not held; (SR) strike rate (events won / competed); (W–L) win–loss record.
To avoid confusion and double counting, these charts are updated at the conclusion of a tournament or when the player's participation has ended.

=== Doubles ===
Current through the 2026 ATP Finals.

	2017	2018	2019	2020	2021	2022	2023	2024	2025	2026	SR	W–L	Win %
Grand Slam tournaments
Australian Open	A	A	3R	1R	2R	3R	A	QF	SF	2R	0 / 7	13–7	65%
French Open	A	A	W	W	QF	1R	QF	3R	2R	3R	2 / 8	22–6	79%
Wimbledon	1R	3R	1R	NH	2R	QF	SF	QF	3R	SF	0 / 9	18–9	67%
US Open	A	1R	SF	2R	QF	2R	1R	F	3R	F	0 / 9	21–9	70%
Win–loss	0–1	2–2	12–3	7–2	8–4	6–4	6–3	12–4	9–4	12–4	2 / 33	74–31	70%
Year-end championship
ATP Finals	DNQ		RR	RR	RR	DNQ		W	RR	SF	1 / 6	11–10	52%
National representation
Summer Olympics	not held				2R	not held		QF	not held		0 / 2	3–2	60%
Davis Cup	A	A	QF	QR	SF	QF	G1	SF	SF	QF	0 / 5	21–2	91%
ATP 1000 tournaments
Indian Wells Open	A	A	A	NH	QF	1R	2R	SF	A	2R	0 / 5	7–5	58%
Miami Open	A	A	A	NH	1R	1R	SF	SF	A	2R	0 / 5	6–5	55%
Monte-Carlo Masters	A	A	A	NH	1R	1R	SF	QF	QF	W	1 / 6	11–5	69%
Madrid Open	A	A	A	NH	2R	QF	1R	2R	SF	1R	0 / 6	6–6	50%
Italian Open	A	A	A	1R	QF	QF	2R	2R	QF	2R	0 / 7	9–6	60%
Canadian Open	A	A	2R	NH	SF	SF	SF	QF	SF	2R	0 / 7	14–7	67%
Cincinnati Open	A	A	1R	QF	2R	QF	2R	2R	2R	1R	0 / 8	8–8	50%
Shanghai Masters	A	A	1R	not held			2R	A	W	QF	1 / 4	8–3	73%
Paris Masters	A	A	SF	1R	2R	SF	1R	A	QF	2R	0 / 7	9–6	60%
Win–loss	0–0	0–0	4–4	2–3	8–8	11–8	13–8	12–7	16–6	12–7	2 / 55	78–51	60%
Career statistics
	2017	2018	2019	2020	2021	2022	2023	2024	2025	2026	Career		
Tournaments (Note: 2009–2016 Tournaments: 7, Overall win–loss: 0–7)	3	5	24	15	21	25	22	21	20	21	184		
Titles	0	0	3	1	2	2	1	2	2	2	15		
Finals	0	0	3	2	5	2	3	5	4	4	28		
Overall win–loss	0–3	3–5	33–22	21–17	41–21	41–26	35–20	45–20	43–19	39–18	301–178		
Win %	0%	38%	60%	55%	66%	61%	64%	69%	69%	68%	63%		
Year-end ranking (Note: Year-end ranking 2010: 394, 2011: 303, 2012: 434, 2013: 427, 2014: 322, 2015: 259, 2016: 135)	129	71	9	19	14	25	21	7	11	9			

=== Mixed doubles ===
Tournament	2019	2020	2021	2022	2023	2024	2025	2026	SR	W–L
Grand Slam tournaments
Australian Open	A	1R	1R	A	A	QF	QF	1R	0 / 5	4–5
French Open	A	NH	A	SF	1R	A	1R	1R	0 / 4	3–4
Wimbledon	1R	NH	SF	1R	2R	2R	1R	1R	0 / 7	3–7
US Open	A	NH	A	2R	2R	A	A	A	0 / 2	2–2
Win–loss	0–1	0–1	1–2	4–3	2–3	3–2	2–3	0–3	0 / 18	12–18
National representation
Summer Olympics	not held		QF	not held		A	not held		0 / 1	1–1
ATP 1000 tournaments
Indian Wells Open	not held					A	A	1R	0 / 1	0–1

== Grand Slam tournament finals ==
=== Doubles: 4 (2 titles, 2 runner-ups) ===
Result	Year	Tournament	Surface	Partner	Opponents	Score
Win	2019	French Open	Clay	(Germany) Andreas Mies	(France) Jérémy Chardy (France) Fabrice Martin	6–2, 7–6^{(7–3)}
Win	2020	French Open (2)	Clay	(Germany) Andreas Mies	(Croatia) Mate Pavić (Brazil) Bruno Soares	6–3, 7–5
Loss	2024	US Open	Hard	(Germany) Tim Pütz	(Australia) Max Purcell (Australia) Jordan Thompson	4–6, 6–7^{(4–7)}
Loss	2026	US Open	Hard	(Germany) Tim Pütz	(United States) Christian Harrison (United Kingdom) Neal Skupski	4–6, 6–7^{(6–8)}

== Other significant finals ==
=== Year-end championships ===
==== Doubles: 1 (1 title) ====
Result	Year	Tournament	Surface	Partner	Opponents	Score
Win	2024	ATP Finals, Turin	Hard (i)	(Germany) Tim Pütz	(El Salvador) Marcelo Arévalo (Croatia) Mate Pavić	7–6^{(7–5)}, 7–6^{(8–6)}

=== Masters 1000 ===
==== Doubles: 2 (2 titles) ====
Result	Year	Tournament	Surface	Partner	Opponents	Score
Win	2025	Shanghai Masters	Hard	(Germany) Tim Pütz	(Sweden) André Göransson (United States) Alex Michelsen	6–4, 6–4
Win	2026	Monte-Carlo Masters	Clay	(Germany) Tim Pütz	(El Salvador) Marcelo Arévalo (Croatia) Mate Pavić	4–6, 6–2, [10–8]

== ATP Tour finals ==
=== Doubles: 28 (15 titles, 13 runner-ups) ===
Legend Grand Slam (2–2) ATP Finals (1–0) ATP 1000 (2–0) ATP 500 (6–5) ATP 250 (4–6)	Finals by surface Hard (4–7) Clay (9–4) Grass (2–2)	Finals by setting Outdoors (12–11) Indoors (3–2)

Result	W–L	Date	Tournament	Tier	Surface	Partner	Opponents	Score
Win	1–0	Feb 2019	New York Open, United States	ATP 250	Hard (i)	(Germany) Andreas Mies	(Mexico) Santiago González (Pakistan) Aisam-ul-Haq Qureshi	6–4, 7–5
Win	2–0	Jun 2019	French Open, France	Grand Slam	Clay	(Germany) Andreas Mies	(France) Jérémy Chardy (France) Fabrice Martin	6–2, 7–6^{(7–3)}
Win	3–0	Oct 2019	European Open, Belgium	ATP 250	Hard (i)	(Germany) Andreas Mies	(United States) Rajeev Ram (United Kingdom) Joe Salisbury	7–6^{(7–1)}, 6–3
Win	4–0	Oct 2020	French Open, France (2)	Grand Slam	Clay	(Germany) Andreas Mies	(Croatia) Mate Pavić (Brazil) Bruno Soares	6–3, 7–5
Loss	4–1	Oct 2020	Cologne Championship, Germany	ATP 250	Hard (i)	(Germany) Andreas Mies	(South Africa) Raven Klaasen (Japan) Ben McLachlan	2–6, 4–6
Loss	4–2	Mar 2021	Rotterdam Open, Netherlands	ATP 500	Hard (i)	(Romania) Horia Tecău	(Croatia) Nikola Mektić (Croatia) Mate Pavić	6–7^{(7–9)}, 2–6
Loss	4–3	Apr 2021	Barcelona Open, Spain	ATP 500	Clay	(Romania) Horia Tecău	(Colombia) Juan Sebastián Cabal (Colombia) Robert Farah	4–6, 2–6
Win	5–3	May 2021	Bavarian Championships, Germany	ATP 250	Clay	(Netherlands) Wesley Koolhof	(Belgium) Sander Gillé (Belgium) Joran Vliegen	4–6, 6–4, [10–5]
Win	6–3	Jun 2021	Halle Open, Germany	ATP 500	Grass	(Romania) Horia Tecău	(Canada) Félix Auger-Aliassime (Poland) Hubert Hurkacz	7–6^{(7–4)}, 6–4
Loss	6–4	Jul 2021	Hamburg Open, Germany	ATP 500	Clay	(Romania) Horia Tecău	(Germany) Tim Pütz (New Zealand) Michael Venus	3–6, 7–6^{(7–3)}, [8–10]
Win	7–4	Apr 2022	Barcelona Open, Spain	ATP 500	Clay	(Germany) Andreas Mies	(Netherlands) Wesley Koolhof (United Kingdom) Neal Skupski	6–7^{(3–7)}, 7–6^{(7–5)}, [10–6]
Win	8–4	May 2022	Bavarian Championships, Germany (2)	ATP 250	Clay	(Germany) Andreas Mies	(Brazil) Rafael Matos (Spain) David Vega Hernández	4–6, 6–4, [10–7]
Loss	8–5	Apr 2023	Bavarian Championships, Germany	ATP 250	Clay	(Germany) Tim Pütz	(Austria) Alexander Erler (Austria) Lucas Miedler	3–6, 4–6
Loss	8–6	Jun 2023	Stuttgart Open, Germany	ATP 250	Grass	(Germany) Tim Pütz	(Croatia) Nikola Mektić (Croatia) Mate Pavić	6–7^{(2–7)}, 3–6
Win	9–6	Jul 2023	Hamburg Open, Germany	ATP 500	Clay	(Germany) Tim Pütz	(Belgium) Sander Gillé (Belgium) Joran Vliegen	7–6^{(7–4)}, 6–3
Loss	9–7	Jan 2024	Brisbane International, Australia	ATP 250	Hard	(Germany) Tim Pütz	(United Kingdom) Lloyd Glasspool (Netherlands) Jean-Julien Rojer	6–7^{(3–7)}, 7–5, [10–12]
Loss	9–8	Jun 2024	Halle Open, Germany	ATP 500	Grass	(Germany) Tim Pütz	(Italy) Simone Bolelli (Italy) Andrea Vavassori	6–7^{(3–7)}, 6–7^{(5–7)}
Win	10–8	Jul 2024	Hamburg Open, Germany (2)	ATP 500	Clay	(Germany) Tim Pütz	(France) Fabien Reboul (France) Édouard Roger-Vasselin	7–6^{(10–8)}, 6–2
Loss	10–9	Sep 2024	US Open, United States	Grand Slam	Hard	(Germany) Tim Pütz	(Australia) Max Purcell (Australia) Jordan Thompson	4–6, 6–7^{(4–7)}
Win	11–9	Nov 2024	ATP Finals, Italy	ATP Finals	Hard (i)	(Germany) Tim Pütz	(El Salvador) Marcelo Arévalo (Croatia) Mate Pavić	7–6^{(7–5)}, 7–6^{(8–6)}
Loss	11–10	Jan 2025	Adelaide International, Australia	ATP 250	Hard	(Germany) Tim Pütz	(Italy) Simone Bolelli (Italy) Andrea Vavassori	6–4, 6–7^{(4–7)}, [9–11]
Loss	11–11	Apr 2025	Bavarian Championships, Germany	ATP 500	Clay	(Germany) Tim Pütz	(Sweden) André Göransson (Netherlands) Sem Verbeek	4–6, 4–6
Win	12–11	Jun 2025	Halle Open, Germany (2)	ATP 500	Grass	(Germany) Tim Pütz	(Italy) Simone Bolelli (Italy) Andrea Vavassori	6–3, 7–6^{(7–4)}
Win	13–11	Oct 2025	Shanghai Masters, China	ATP 1000	Hard	(Germany) Tim Pütz	(Sweden) André Göransson (United States) Alex Michelsen	6–4, 6–4
Loss	13–12	Jan 2026	Adelaide International, Australia	ATP 250	Hard	(Germany) Tim Pütz	(Finland) Harri Heliövaara (United Kingdom) Henry Patten	3–6, 2–6
Win	14–12	Apr 2026	Monte-Carlo Masters, Monaco	ATP 1000	Clay	(Germany) Tim Pütz	(El Salvador) Marcelo Arévalo (Croatia) Mate Pavić	4–6, 6–2, [10–8]
Win	15–12	May 2026	Hamburg Open, Germany (3)	ATP 500	Clay	(Germany) Tim Pütz	(France) Sadio Doumbia (France) Fabien Reboul	6–3, 4–6, [10–8]
Loss	15–13	Sep 2026	US Open, United States	Grand Slam	Hard	(Germany) Tim Pütz	(United States) Christian Harrison (United Kingdom) Neal Skupski	4–6, 6–7^{(6–8)}

== ATP Challenger finals ==
=== Doubles: 27 (17–10) ===
Finals by surface
Hard (3–1)
Clay (12–8)
Grass (0–1)
Carpet (2–0)

Result	W–L	Date	Tournament	Surface	Partner	Opponents	Score
Win	1–0	Sep 2015	Meknes Challenger, Morocco	Clay	(Germany) Maximilian Marterer	(Italy) Gianluca Naso (Italy) Riccardo Sinicropi	7–5, 6–1
Loss	1–1	Sep 2015	Kenitra Challenger, Morocco	Clay	(Germany) Maximilian Marterer	(Spain) Gerard Granollers Pujol (Spain) Oriol Roca Batalla	6–3, 6–7^{(4–7)}, [8–10]
Loss	1–2	May 2016	Venice Challenge Save Cup, Italy	Clay	(Croatia) Dino Marcan	(Brazil) Fabrício Neis (Brazil) Caio Zampieri	6–7^{(3–7)}, 6–4, [10–12]
Win	2–2	Jul 2016	Guzzini Challenger, Italy	Hard	(France) Albano Olivetti	(Belgium) Ruben Bemelmans (Spain) Adrián Menéndez Maceiras	6–3, 7–6^{(7–4)}
Win	3–2	Sep 2016	Kenitra Challenger, Morocco	Clay	(Germany) Maximilian Marterer	(Belarus) Uladzimir Ignatik (Austria) Michael Linzer	7–6^{(8–6)}, 4–6, [10–6]
Win	4–2	Nov 2016	Eckental Challenger, Germany	Carpet (i)	(France) Albano Olivetti	(Czech Republic) Roman Jebavý (Slovakia) Andrej Martin	6–7^{(8–10)}, 6–4, [10–7]
Win	5–2	Nov 2016	Val Gardena Internazionali, Italy	Hard (i)	(France) Albano Olivetti	(Canada) Frank Dancevic (Serbia) Marko Tepavac	6–4, 6–4
Loss	5–3	Apr 2017	Panama Cup, Panama	Clay	(Spain) Adrián Menéndez Maceiras	(Peru) Sergio Galdós (Brazil) Caio Zampieri	6–1, 6–7^{(5–7)}, [7–10]
Loss	5–4	Apr 2017	Abruzzo International, Italy	Clay	(Australia) Rameez Junaid	(Austria) Julian Knowle (Slovakia) Igor Zelenay	6–3, 2–6, [7–10]
Loss	5–5	May 2017	Karshi Challenger, Uzbekistan	Hard	(Spain) Adrián Menéndez Maceiras	(Ukraine) Denys Molchanov (Ukraine) Sergiy Stakhovsky	4–6, 6–7^{(7–9)}
Loss	5–6	Jul 2017	Sparkassen Open, Germany	Clay	(Germany) Gero Kretschmer	(Austria) Julian Knowle (Slovakia) Igor Zelenay	3–6, 6–7^{(3–7)}
Win	6–6	Aug 2017	Meerbusch Challenger, Germany	Clay	(Germany) Andreas Mies	(Germany) Dustin Brown (Croatia) Antonio Šančić	6–1, 7–6^{(7–5)}
Loss	6–7	Sep 2017	Città di Como Challenger, Italy	Clay	(Belarus) Aliaksandr Bury	(Netherlands) Sander Arends (Croatia) Antonio Šančić	6–7^{(1–7)}, 2–6
Loss	6–8	Apr 2018	San Luis Open, Mexico	Clay	(United Kingdom) Jay Clarke	(El Salvador) Marcelo Arévalo (Mexico) Miguel Ángel Reyes-Varela	1–6, 4–6
Win	7–8	Apr 2018	Panama Cup, Panama	Clay	(Germany) Yannick Hanfmann	(United States) Nathan Pasha (Ecuador) Roberto Quiroz	7–6^{(7–4)}, 6–4
Win	8–8	Apr 2018	CDMX Open, Mexico	Clay	(Germany) Yannick Hanfmann	(United Kingdom) Luke Bambridge (United Kingdom) Jonny O'Mara	6–2, 7–6^{(7–3)}
Win	9–8	May 2018	Garden Open, Italy	Clay	(Germany) Andreas Mies	(Belgium) Sander Gillé (Belgium) Joran Vliegen	6–3, 2–6, [10–4]
Loss	9–9	May 2018	Heilbronner Neckarcup, Germany	Clay	(Germany) Andreas Mies	(Australia) Rameez Junaid (Netherlands) David Pel	2–6, 6–2, [7–10]
Win	10–9	Jun 2018	Almaty Challenger, Kazakhstan	Clay	(Germany) Andreas Mies	(Lithuania) Laurynas Grigelis (Ukraine) Vladyslav Manafov	6–2, 7–6^{(7–2)}
Loss	10–10	Jun 2018	Ilkley Trophy, United Kingdom	Grass	(Germany) Andreas Mies	(United States) Austin Krajicek (India) Jeevan Nedunchezhiyan	3–6, 3–6
Win	11–10	Sep 2018	AON Open Challenger, Italy	Clay	(Germany) Andreas Mies	(Slovakia) Martin Kližan (Slovakia) Filip Polášek	6–2, 3–6, [10–2]
Win	12–10	Sep 2018	Sibiu Open, Romania	Clay	(Germany) Andreas Mies	(Poland) Tomasz Bednarek (Netherlands) David Pel	6–4, 6–2
Win	13–10	Nov 2018	Eckental Challenger, Germany (2)	Carpet (i)	(Germany) Andreas Mies	(France) Hugo Nys (United Kingdom) Jonny O'Mara	6–1, 6–4
Win	14–10	Feb 2019	Hungarian Challenger Open, Hungary	Hard (i)	(Slovakia) Filip Polášek	(Italy) Filippo Baldi (Switzerland) Luca Margaroli	7–5, 7–6^{(7–5)}
Win	15–10	Mar 2019	Marbella Open, Spain	Clay	(Germany) Andreas Mies	(Belgium) Sander Gillé (Belgium) Joran Vliegen	7–6^{(8–6)}, 2–6, [10–6]
Win	16–10	May 2019	Open du Pays d'Aix, France	Clay	(Austria) Jürgen Melzer	(Denmark) Frederik Nielsen (Germany) Tim Pütz	7–6^{(7–5)}, 6–2
Win	17–10	May 2019	Heilbronner Neckarcup, Germany	Clay	(Germany) Andreas Mies	(Germany) Andre Begemann (France) Fabrice Martin	6–2, 6–4

== ITF Futures finals ==
=== Singles: 13 (4–9) ===
Finals by surface
Hard (1–0)
Clay (3–8)
Carpet (0–1)

Result	W–L	Date	Tournament	Surface	Opponent	Score
Loss	0–1	May 2011	F3 Båstad, Sweden	Clay	(France) Julien Obry	1–6, 0–6
Loss	0–2	Jul 2011	F7 Kassel, Germany	Clay	(Czech Republic) Dušan Lojda	6–4, 0–6, 3–6
Win	1–2	Jul 2011	F4 Bad Waltersdorf, Austria	Clay	(Austria) Gerald Melzer	7–6^{(7–3)}, 6–1
Loss	1–3	Aug 2011	F7 Pörtschach, Austria	Clay	(Italy) Riccardo Bellotti	4–6, 3–6
Loss	1–4	Sep 2011	F9 Umag, Croatia	Clay	(Belgium) Germain Gigounon	6–4, 2–6, 3–6
Win	2–4	Mar 2012	F4 Poreč, Croatia	Clay	(Croatia) Dino Marcan	6–3, 5–7, 6–3
Win	3–4	May 2012	F2 Bucharest, Romania	Clay	(Croatia) Dino Marcan	6–2, 7–5
Loss	3–5	May 2013	F6 Sharm El Sheikh, Egypt	Clay	(Morocco) Yassine Idmbarek	5–7, 6–4, 6–7^{(5–7)}
Loss	3–6	Sep 2013	F10 St. Pölten, Austria	Clay	(Austria) Nikolaus Moser	1–6, 6–4, 1–6
Loss	3–7	Nov 2014	F40 Antalya, Turkey	Clay	(Slovenia) Janez Semrajč	3–6, 5–7
Loss	3–8	Jul 2015	F5 Kenn, Germany	Clay	(Germany) Florian Fallert	3–6, 6–3, 2–6
Loss	3–9	Jan 2018	F1 Schwieberdingen, Germany	Carpet (i)	(Germany) Daniel Masur	2–6, 5–7
Win	4–9	Mar 2018	F9 Jerba, Tunisia	Hard	(France) Gianni Mina	6–2, 6–1

=== Doubles: 45 (27–18) ===
Finals by surface
Hard (7–6)
Clay (14–9)
Carpet (6–3)

Result	W–L	Date	Tournament	Surface	Partner	Opponents	Score
Win	1–0	Mar 2010	F2 Wetzikon, Switzerland	Carpet (i)	(Germany) Marcel Zimmermann	(Italy) Walter Trusendi (Estonia) Jürgen Zopp	6–2, 3–6, [10–5]
Win	2–0	Apr 2010	F7 Adana, Turkey	Clay	(Germany) Marcel Zimmermann	(Chile) Hans Podlipnik Castillo (Chile) Ricardo Urzúa Rivera	6–4, 5–7, [10–6]
Win	3–0	Apr 2010	F8 Tarsus, Turkey	Clay	(Germany) Marcel Zimmermann	(Chile) Hans Podlipnik Castillo (Chile) Ricardo Urzúa Rivera	6–3, 6–7^{(5–7)}, [10–6]
Loss	3–1	Oct 2010	F16 Hambach, Germany	Carpet (i)	(Germany) Marko Krickovic	(Latvia) Kārlis Lejnieks (Russia) Denis Matsukevich	6–3, 6–7^{(5–7)}, [4–10]
Win	4–1	Nov 2010	F4 Ramat HaSharon, Israel	Hard	(Russia) Sergei Krotiouk	(Israel) Noam Behr (Israel) Tal Eros	2–6, 6–4, [10–5]
Loss	4–2	Nov 2010	F5 Tel Aviv, Israel	Hard	(Russia) Sergei Krotiouk	(France) Rudy Coco (France) Fabrice Martin	3–6, 4–6
Win	5–2	Dec 2010	F2 Santo Domingo, Dominican Republic	Hard	(France) Pierre-Hugues Herbert	(Venezuela) Piero Luisi (Venezuela) Román Recarte	7–6^{(7–4)}, 6–3
Win	6–2	Jan 2011	F3 Kaarst, Germany	Carpet (i)	(Germany) Marcel Zimmermann	(United Kingdom) Chris Eaton (United Kingdom) Alexander Slabinsky	6–3, 7–5
Loss	6–3	Feb 2011	F1 Zagreb, Croatia	Hard (i)	(Germany) Marcel Zimmermann	(United Kingdom) Joshua Milton (Netherlands) Tim van Terheijden	6–7^{(6–8)}, 7–5, [4–10]
Loss	6–4	Mar 2011	F3 Poreč, Croatia	Clay	(Germany) Marcel Zimmermann	(Germany) Steven Moneke (Germany) Marc Sieber	3–6, 3–6
Loss	6–5	Apr 2011	F3 Rovinj, Croatia	Clay	(Germany) Marcel Zimmermann	(Slovakia) Kamil Čapkovič (Slovakia) Michal Pažický	2–6, 1–6
Loss	6–6	Aug 2011	F11 Karlsruhe, Germany	Clay	(Germany) Matthias Kolbe	(Germany) Florian Fallert (Germany) Nils Langer	3–6, 4–6
Win	7–6	Sep 2011	F9 Umag, Croatia	Clay	(Germany) Marcel Zimmermann	(Austria) Nikolaus Moser (Austria) Max Raditschnigg	7–6^{(12–10)}, 6–2
Win	8–6	Oct 2011	F37 Sant Cugat, Spain	Clay	(Germany) Marcel Zimmermann	(Spain) Marc Fornell Mestres (Spain) Miguel Ángel López Jaén	3–6, 7–6^{(7–5)}, [10–4]
Loss	8–7	Jan 2012	F2 Stuttgart, Germany	Hard (i)	(Germany) Marcel Zimmermann	(Romania) Marius Copil (Germany) Simon Stadler	1–6, 2–6
Win	9–7	Feb 2012	F1 Mallorca, Spain	Clay	(Austria) Sam Weissborn	(Spain) Agustín Boje-Ordóñez (Spain) Pablo Martín-Adalia	6–2, 6–4
Win	10–7	Apr 2012	F5 Rovin, Croatia	Clay	(Germany) Marcel Zimmermann	(Croatia) Marin Draganja (Croatia) Dino Marcan	6–4, 6–4
Win	11–7	Oct 2012	F18 Cardiff, United Kingdom	Hard (i)	(Germany) Bastian Knittel	(Lithuania) Laurynas Grigelis (Italy) Giuseppe Menga	3–6, 6–4, [10–7]
Loss	11–8	Mar 2013	F3 Umag, Croatia	Clay	(Germany) Marc Sieber	(Austria) Gibril Diarra (Croatia) Joško Topić	4–6, 3–6
Win	12–8	May 2013	F6 Sharm El Sheikh, Egypt	Clay	(Germany) Dominik Schulz	(Morocco) Younès Rachidi (Morocco) Mehdi Ziadi	6–2, 6–1
Win	13–8	Jul 2013	F8 Kassel, Germany	Clay	(Croatia) Kristijan Mesaroš	(Czech Republic) Marek Michalička (Czech Republic) David Pultr	6–4, 7–6^{(7–4)}
Win	14–8	Jan 2014	F2 Stuttgart, Germany	Hard (i)	(Germany) Hannes Wagner	(Russia) Karen Khachanov (Russia) Denis Matsukevich	4–6, 6–3, [10–7]
Win	15–8	Mar 2014	F3 Trento, Italy	Hard (i)	(France) Fabrice Martin	(Poland) Błażej Koniusz (Italy) Matteo Volante	6–3, 6–1
Win	16–8	Jun 2014	F2 Maribor, Slovenia	Clay	(United States) Erik Elliott	(Slovenia) Miha Mlakar (Slovenia) Tomislav Ternar	6–0, 7–5
Loss	16–9	Jul 2014	F2 Seefeld, Austria	Clay	(Germany) Dominik Schulz	(United States) Erik Elliott (Australia) Gavin van Peperzeel	6–3, 2–6, [6–10]
Loss	16–10	Aug 2014	F11 Friedberg, Germany	Clay	(Germany) Hannes Wagner	(Germany) Florian Fallert (Germany) Sebastian Sachs	6–7^{(6–8)}, 6–7^{(7–9)}
Loss	16–11	Oct 2014	F15 Leimen, Germany	Hard (i)	(Germany) Hannes Wagner	(United States) Peter Kobelt (United States) Connor Smith	3–6, 2–6
Win	17–11	Oct 2014	F16 Bad Salzdetfurth, Germany	Carpet (i)	(Germany) Maximilian Marterer	(Germany) Denis Kapric (Germany) Lukas Rüpke	6–3, 7–6^{(7–4)}
Win	18–11	Nov 2014	F40 Antalya, Turkey	Clay	(Germany) Maximilian Marterer	(Slovenia) Janez Semrajč (Austria) Sam Weissborn	6–3, 6–2
Loss	18–12	Jan 2015	F2 Stuttgart, Germany	Hard (i)	(Germany) Maximilian Marterer	(France) Tom Jomby (France) Mick Lescure	6–7^{(4–7)}, 4–6
Loss	18–13	Feb 2015	F4 Antalya, Turkey	Hard	(Germany) Jan Choinski	(China) Li Zhe (South Africa) Ruan Roelofse	3–6, 6–4, [2–10]
Win	19–13	Jun 2015	F5 Sarajevo, Bosnia	Clay	(Germany) Nils Langer	(Serbia) Darko Jandrić (Serbia) Miki Janković	6–4, 6–4
Win	20–13	Jul 2015	F5 Kenn, Germany	Clay	(Germany) Maximilian Marterer	(Germany) Maximilian Bohl (Germany) Benedikt Müller	6–0, 6–1
Win	21–13	Jul 2015	F3 Telfs, Austria	Clay	(Germany) Hannes Wagner	(Italy) Marco Bortolotti (Italy) Riccardo Ghedin	6–1, 2–6, [10–7]
Win	22–13	Aug 2015	F11 Friedberg, Germany	Clay	(Germany) Johannes Härteis	(Germany) Jakob Sude (Germany) George von Massow	6–3, 6–7^{(5–7)}, [11–9]
Loss	22–14	Aug 2015	F9 Pörtschach, Austria	Clay	(Switzerland) Luca Margaroli	(Russia) Kirill Dmitriev (Austria) Lucas Miedler	2–6, 5–7
Loss	22–15	Nov 2015	F18 Ismaning, Germany	Carpet (i)	(Germany) Tim Sandkaulen	(Austria) Alexander Erler (Germany) Constantin Frantzen	6–2, 6–7^{(5–7)}, [8–10]
Win	23–15	Jan 2016	F3 Nußloch, Germany	Carpet (i)	(Germany) Johannes Härteis	(Belgium) Niels Desein (Belarus) Uladzimir Ignatik	6–7^{(5–7)}, 6–4, [10–8]
Loss	23–16	Feb 2016	F2 Trimbach, Switzerland	Carpet (i)	(Germany) Johannes Härteis	(Belarus) Uladzimir Ignatik (Slovakia) Adrian Sikora	4–6, 7–5, [7–10]
Loss	23–17	Apr 2016	F14 Hammamet, Tunisia	Clay	(Austria) Pascal Brunner	(United States) Cătălin Gârd (Portugal) Fred Gil	3–6, 7–5, [3–10]
Loss	23–18	Apr 2016	F15 Hammamet, Tunisia	Clay	(France) Gianni Mina	(United States) Cătălin Gârd (Germany) Andreas Mies	5–7, 4–6
Win	24–18	Jan 2018	F1 Schwieberdingen, Germany	Carpet (i)	(Germany) Daniel Masur	(France) Sébastien Boltz (Germany) Kai Wehnelt	4–6, 6–2, [10–2]
Win	25–18	Jan 2018	F2 Nußloch, Germany	Carpet (i)	(South Africa) Ruan Roelofse	(Argentina) Pedro Cachin (Germany) Daniel Masur	6–3, 6–3
Win	26–18	Mar 2018	F8 Jerba, Tunisia	Hard	(Argentina) Mariano Kestelboim	(Brazil) Eduardo Dischinger (Japan) Ken Onishi	4–6, 6–3, [10–7]
Win	27–18	Mar 2018	F9 Jerba, Tunisia	Hard	(Russia) Aleksandr Vasilenko	(France) Florent Diep (France) Jonathan Kanar	6–7^{(3–7)}, 6–3, [10–8]

== Junior Grand Slam finals ==
=== Doubles: 2 (1 title, 1 runner-up) ===
Result	Year	Tournament	Surface	Partner	Opponent	Score
Win	2009	Wimbledon	Grass	(France) Pierre-Hugues Herbert	(France) Julien Obry (France) Adrien Puget	6–7^{(3–7)}, 6–2, [12–10]
Loss	2010	Australian Open	Hard	(Germany) Dominik Schulz	(Netherlands) Justin Eleveld (Netherlands) Jannick Lupescu	4–6, 4–6

== National participation ==
=== Davis Cup (21–3) ===
Group membership Finals (13–2) Qualifying round (7–1) World Group I (1–0)	Matches by type Singles (0–1) Doubles (21–2)	Matches by surface Hard (19–3) Clay (2–0)	Matches by venue Germany (6–0) Away (6–1) Neutral (9–2)

Date	Venue	Surface	Rd	Opponent nation	Score	Match	Opponent player(s)	W/L	Rubber score
2019
Nov 2019	Madrid	Hard (i)	RR	Argentina	3–0	Doubles (w/ A Mies)	M González / L Mayer	Win	6–7^{(4–7)}, 7–6^{(7–2)}, 7–6^{(20–18)}
Nov 2019	Madrid	Hard (i)	RR	Chile	2–1	Doubles (w/ A Mies)	A Tabilo / T Barrios Vera	Win	7–6^{(7–3)}, 6–3
2020–21
Mar 2020	Düsseldorf	Hard (i)	QR	Belarus	4–1	Doubles (w/ A Mies)	I Ivashka / A Vasilevski	Win	6–4, 7–6^{(7–5)}
Nov 2021	Innsbruck	Hard (i)	RR	Serbia	2–1	Doubles (w/ T Pütz)	N Ćaćić / N Djokovic	Win	7–6^{(7–5)}, 3–6, 7–6^{(7–5)}
Nov 2021	Innsbruck	Hard (i)	RR	Austria	2–1	Doubles (w/ T Pütz)	O Marach / P Oswald	Win	6–3, 6–4
Nov 2021	Innsbruck	Hard (i)	QF	Great Britain	2–1	Doubles (w/ T Pütz)	J Salisbury / N Skupski	Win	7–6^{(12–10)}, 7–6^{(7–5)}
Dec 2021	Madrid	Hard (i)	SF	Russia	1–2	Doubles (w/ T Pütz)	A Karatsev / K Khachanov	Win	4–6, 6–3, 6–4
2022
Mar 2022	Rio de Janeiro	Clay	QR	Brazil	3–1	Doubles (w/ T Pütz)	F Meligeni Alves / B Soares	Win	4–6, 7–6^{(7–4)}, 6–4
Sep 2022	Hamburg	Hard (i)	RR	France	2–1	Doubles (w/ T Pütz)	N Mahut / A Rinderknech	Win	6–2, 3–6, 7–6^{(7–1)}
Sep 2022	Hamburg	Hard (i)	RR	Belgium	2–1	Doubles (w/ T Pütz)	S Gillé / J Vliegen	Win	4–6, 6–2, 7–6^{(7–5)}
Sep 2022	Hamburg	Hard (i)	RR	Australia	2–1	Doubles (w/ T Pütz)	M Ebden / M Purcell	Win	6–4, 6–4
Nov 2022	Málaga	Hard (i)	QF	Canada	1–2	Doubles (w/ T Pütz)	V Pospisil / D Shapovalov	Loss	6–2, 3–6, 3–6
2023
Sep 2023	Mostar	Clay	WG1	(Bosnia and Herzegovina) Bosnia & Herz.	4–0	Doubles (w/ T Pütz)	M Bašić / D Džumhur	Win	6–4, 6–2
2024
Feb 2024	Tatabánya	Hard (i)	QR	Hungary	3–2	Doubles (w/ T Pütz)	F Marozsán / M Valkusz	Win	6–3, 7–6^{(7–3)}
Feb 2024	Tatabánya	Hard (i)	QR	Hungary	3–2	Singles	Zsombor Piros	Loss	6–7^{(2–7)}, 3–6
Sep 2024	Zhuhai	Hard (i)	RR	Slovakia	3–0	Doubles (w/ T Pütz)	L Klein / I Zelenay	Win	7–5, 6–3
Sep 2024	Zhuhai	Hard (i)	RR	Chile	3–0	Doubles (w/ T Pütz)	T Barrios Vera / M Soto	Win	6–1, 6–3
Sep 2024	Zhuhai	Hard (i)	RR	United States	1–2	Doubles (w/ T Pütz)	A Krajicek / R Ram	Win	6–1, 7–6^{(7–4)}
2025
Feb 2025	Vilnius	Hard (i)	Q1	Israel	3–1	Doubles (w/ T Pütz)	D Cukierman / A Vales	Win	6–0, 6–3
Sep 2025	Tokyo	Hard (i)	Q2	Japan	4–0	Doubles (w/ T Pütz)	Y Watanuki / T Yuzuki	Win	6–3, 7–6^{(7–4)}
Nov 2025	Bologna	Hard (i)	QF	Argentina	2–1	Doubles (w/ T Pütz)	A Molteni / H Zeballos	Win	4–6, 6–4, 7–6^{(12–10)}
Nov 2025	Bologna	Hard (i)	SF	Spain	1–2	Doubles (w/ T Pütz)	M Granollers / P Martínez	Loss	2–6, 6–3, 3–6
2026
Feb 2026	Düsseldorf	Hard (i)	Q1	Peru	4–0	Doubles (w/ T Pütz)	I Buse / A Huertas del Pino	Win	6–0, 2–6, 6–4
Sep 2026	Halle	Hard (i)	Q2	Croatia	3–1	Doubles (w/ T Pütz)	N Mektić / M Pavić	Win	6–2, 7–5

=== ATP Cup (3–5) ===
Venue	Surface	Rd	Opponent nation	Score	Match	Opponent player(s)	W/L	Match score
2020
Brisbane	Hard	RR	Australia	0–3	Doubles (w/ A Mies)	C Guccione / J Peers	Loss	3–6, 4–6
Brisbane	Hard	RR	Greece	2–1	Doubles (w/ A Mies)	M Pervolarakis / S Tsitsipas	Win	3–6, 6–3, [17–15]
Brisbane	Hard	RR	Canada	1–2	Doubles (w/ A Mies)	F Auger-Aliassime / D Shapovalov	Loss	3–6, 6–7^{(4–7)}
2021
Melbourne	Hard	RR	Canada	2–1	Doubles (w/ J-L Struff)	S Diez / P Polansky	Loss	6–7^{(4–7)}, 7–6^{(8–6)}, [3–10]
Melbourne	Hard	SF	Russia	1–2	Doubles (w/ J-L Struff)	E Donskoy / A Karatsev	Win	6–3, 7–6^{(7–2)}
2022
Sydney	Hard	RR	Great Britain	1–2	Doubles (w/ A Zverev)	D Evans / J Murray	Loss	3–6, 4–6
Sydney	Hard	RR	United States	2–1	Doubles (w/ T Pütz)	T Fritz / J Isner	Loss	0–6, 3–6
Sydney	Hard	RR	Canada	1–2	Doubles (w/ T Pütz)	S Diez / B Schnur	Win	6–3, 6–4
