= 2025 Abierto Mexicano Telcel =

- Date: 24 February – 1 March
- Edition: 32nd
- Draw: 32S / 16D
- Surface: Hard, outdoor
- Location: Acapulco, Mexico
- Venue: Arena GNP Seguros

Champions

Singles
- (Czech Republic) Tomáš Macháč

Doubles
- (United States) Christian Harrison / (United States) Evan King
← 2024 ·	Mexican Open	· 2026 →

The 2025 Mexican Open (also known as the Abierto Mexicano Telcel presentado por HSBC for sponsorship reasons) was a professional tennis tournament played on outdoor hard courts. It was the 32nd edition of the men's Mexican Open, and an ATP 500 tournament on the 2025 ATP Tour. The tournament took place in Acapulco, Mexico between 24 February and 1 March 2025, at the Arena GNP Seguros.

== Champions ==
=== Singles ===
- (Czech Republic) Tomáš Macháč def. (Spain) Alejandro Davidovich Fokina, 7–6^{(8–6)}, 6–2

=== Doubles ===
- (United States) Christian Harrison / (United States) Evan King def. (France) Sadio Doumbia / (France) Fabien Reboul 6–4, 6–0

== Singles main-draw entrants ==
=== Seeds ===
Country	Player	Ranking^{1}	Seed
GER	Alexander Zverev	2	1
NOR	Casper Ruud	5	2
USA	Tommy Paul	9	3
DEN	Holger Rune	12	4
USA	Ben Shelton	13	5
~~ITA~~	~~Lorenzo Musetti~~	~~17~~	~~6~~
USA	Frances Tiafoe	18	7
CZE	Tomáš Macháč	25	8
CAN	Denis Shapovalov	32	9

- ^{1} Rankings as of 17 February 2025.

=== Other entrants ===
The following players received wildcards into the main draw:

- (Germany) Daniel Altmaier
- (China) Bu Yunchaokete
- (Mexico) Rodrigo Pacheco Méndez

The following players received entry from the qualifying draw:

- (United States) Nishesh Basavareddy
- (Canada) Gabriel Diallo
- (United States) Learner Tien
- (Australia) Adam Walton

The following player received entry as a lucky loser:

- (Italy) Mattia Bellucci

=== Withdrawals ===
- (United States) Taylor Fritz → replaced by (Australia) Rinky Hijikata
- (Poland) Hubert Hurkacz → replaced by (France) Arthur Rinderknech
- (United States) Sebastian Korda → replaced by (Spain) Alejandro Davidovich Fokina
- (Italy) Lorenzo Musetti → replaced by (Italy) Mattia Bellucci
- (United States) Reilly Opelka → replaced by (United Kingdom) Cameron Norrie

== Doubles main-draw entrants ==
=== Seeds ===
Country	Player	Country	Player	Rank^{1}	Seed
USA	Jackson Withrow	ARG	Horacio Zeballos	30	1
BEL	Sander Gillé	POL	Jan Zieliński	48	2
MON	Hugo Nys	FRA	Édouard Roger-Vasselin	56	3
FRA	Sadio Doumbia	FRA	Fabien Reboul	66	4

- ^{1} Rankings as of 17 February 2025.

=== Other entrants ===
The following pairs received wildcards into the doubles main draw:

- (India) Sriram Balaji / (Mexico) Miguel Ángel Reyes-Varela
- (Mexico) Hans Hach Verdugo / (United States) JJ Tracy

The following pair received entry from the qualifying draw:

- (United States) Christian Harrison / (United States) Evan King

=== Withdrawals ===
- (Italy) Flavio Cobolli / (Italy) Lorenzo Musetti → replaced by (Italy) Mattia Bellucci / (Italy) Flavio Cobolli
- (United States) Sebastian Korda / (United States) Ben Shelton → replaced by (Australia) Rinky Hijikata / (United States) Ben Shelton
