= 2025 Abierto Mexicano Telcel – Singles =

Singles
- 2025 Abierto Mexicano Telcel

Final
- Champion: (Czech Republic) Tomáš Macháč
- Runner-up: (Spain) Alejandro Davidovich Fokina
- Score: 7–6^{(8–6)}, 6–2

Details
- Draw: 32 (4 Q / 3 WC )
- Seeds: 8

Events
Singles	Doubles
- Mexican Open

Tomáš Macháč defeated Alejandro Davidovich Fokina in the final, 7–6^{(8–6)}, 6–2, to win the singles title at the 2025 Mexican Open. It was his first ATP Tour title.

Alex de Minaur was the two-time reigning champion, but chose to compete in Dubai instead.

== Seeds ==
1. (Germany) Alexander Zverev (second round)
2. (Norway) Casper Ruud (second round, withdrew)
3. (United States) Tommy Paul (second round, withdrew)
4. (Denmark) Holger Rune (second round, retired)
5. (United States) Ben Shelton (second round)
6. (Italy) Lorenzo Musetti (withdrew)
7. (United States) Frances Tiafoe (second round)
8. (Czech Republic) Tomáš Macháč (champion)
9. (Canada) Denis Shapovalov (semifinals)

== Draw ==
Key

- Q = Qualifier
- WC = Wild card
- LL = Lucky loser
- Alt = Alternate
- ITF = ITF entry
- PR = Protected ranking
- SR = Special ranking
- SE = Special exempt
- JE = Junior exempt
- JR = Junior Accelerator Programme entrant
- CO = College Accelerator Programme entrant
- NG = Next Gen Accelerator Program entrant
- w/o = Walkover
- r = Retired
- d = Defaulted

=== Finals ===
Semifinals
8	(Czech Republic) Tomáš Macháč	6	1	6
(United States) Brandon Nakashima	4	6	4
9	(Canada) Denis Shapovalov	6^{3}	6^{1}
(Spain) Alejandro Davidovich Fokina	7^{7}	7^{7}

Final
8	(Czech Republic) Tomáš Macháč	7^{8}	6
(Spain) Alejandro Davidovich Fokina	6^{6}	2

=== Top half ===
First round
1	(Germany) A Zverev	6^{2}	6	6
(Italy) M Arnaldi	7^{7}	3	4
Q	(United States) L Tien	7^{7}	6
(United Kingdom) C Norrie	6^{5}	3
WC	(Germany) D Altmaier	4	6	6
(Serbia) M Kecmanović	6	4	3
(Czech Republic) J Menšík	4	6	3
8	(Czech Republic) T Macháč	6	2	6
4	(Denmark) H Rune	7^{7}	6
(Spain) R Carballés Baena	6^{4}	3
(France) B Bonzi	6^{6}	5
(United States) B Nakashima	7^{8}	7
(Belgium) D Goffin	6	6
(Australia) R Hijikata	2	3
(Italy) F Cobolli	6^{4}	6^{4}
5	(United States) B Shelton	7^{7}	7^{7}

Second round
1	(Germany) A Zverev	3	4
Q	(United States) L Tien	6	6
WC	(Germany) D Altmaier	6^{3}	1
8	(Czech Republic) T Macháč	7^{7}	6
4	(Denmark) H Rune	0^{r}
(United States) B Nakashima	3
(Belgium) D Goffin	7^{7}	6
5	(United States) B Shelton	6^{3}	3

Quarterfinals
Q	(United States) L Tien	3	5
8	(Czech Republic) T Macháč	6	7
(United States) B Nakashima	7^{7}	6
(Belgium) D Goffin	6^{4}	2

Semifinals
8	(Czech Republic) T Macháč	6	1	6
(United States) B Nakashima	4	6	4

=== Bottom half ===
First round
9	(Canada) D Shapovalov	7	6
Q	(United States) N Basavareddy	5	2
(United States) A Michelsen	2	7^{7}	7^{7}
WC	(China) Y Bu	6	6^{5}	6^{5}
(United States) M Giron	7^{7}	6
Q	(Australia) A Walton	6^{4}	2
Q	(Canada) G Diallo	2	2
3	(United States) T Paul	6	6
7	(United States) F Tiafoe	6	6
(France) A Müller	4	2
(Spain) A Davidovich Fokina	1	7^{8}	6
LL	(Italy) M Bellucci	6	6^{6}	2
(Australia) A Vukic	5	6	6^{4}
WC	(Mexico) R Pacheco Méndez	7	4	7^{7}
(France) A Rinderknech	4	3
2	(Norway) C Ruud	6	6

Second round
9	(Canada) D Shapovalov	6	6
(United States) A Michelsen	4	3
(United States) M Giron	w/o
3	(United States) T Paul
7	(United States) F Tiafoe	3	7^{8}	3
(Spain) A Davidovich Fokina	6	6^{6}	6
WC	(Mexico) R Pacheco Méndez	w/o
2	(Norway) C Ruud

Quarterfinals
9	(Canada) D Shapovalov	4	6	6
(United States) M Giron	6	3	2
(Spain) A Davidovich Fokina	6	6
WC	(Mexico) R Pacheco Méndez	2	2

Semifinals
9	(Canada) D Shapovalov	6^{3}	6^{1}
(Spain) A Davidovich Fokina	7^{7}	7^{7}

== Qualifying ==
=== Seeds ===
1. (Italy) Mattia Bellucci (qualifying competition, lucky loser)
2. (United States) Aleksandar Kovacevic (qualifying competition)
3. (Australia) Rinky Hijikata (moved to main draw)
4. (United States) Learner Tien (qualified)
5. (Serbia) Dušan Lajović (qualifying competition)
6. (Canada) Gabriel Diallo (qualified)
7. (Australia) Adam Walton (qualified)
8. (Australia) James Duckworth (first round)

=== Qualifiers ===
1. (Canada) Gabriel Diallo
2. (Australia) Adam Walton
3. (United States) Nishesh Basavareddy
4. (United States) Learner Tien

=== Lucky loser ===
1. (Italy) Mattia Bellucci

=== Qualifying draw ===
==== First qualifier ====
First round
1	(Italy) Mattia Bellucci	6	6
(United States) Christopher Eubanks	2	4
WC	(Mexico) Rafael Alfonso de Alba Valdés	1	1
6	(Canada) Gabriel Diallo	6	6

Qualifying competition
1	(Italy) Mattia Bellucci	1	0
6	(Canada) Gabriel Diallo	6	6

==== Second qualifier ====
First round
2	(United States) Aleksandar Kovacevic	6	3	6
WC	(Mexico) Alan Magadán	2	6	3
(France) Adrian Mannarino	4	0
7	(Australia) Adam Walton	6	6

Qualifying competition
2	(United States) Aleksandar Kovacevic	6	2	3
7	(Australia) Adam Walton	3	6	6

==== Third qualifier ====
First round
Alt	(Portugal) Duarte Vale	1	4
WC	(United States) Stefan Kozlov	6	6
(United States) Nishesh Basavareddy	6	6
8	(Australia) James Duckworth	4	2

Qualifying competition
WC	(United States) Stefan Kozlov	2	4
(United States) Nishesh Basavareddy	6	6

==== Fourth qualifier ====
First round
4	(United States) Learner Tien	6	6
Alt	(Argentina) Federico Agustín Gómez	1	3
Alt	(Kazakhstan) Dmitry Popko	2	6	4
5	(Serbia) Dušan Lajović	6	1	6

Qualifying competition
4	(United States) Learner Tien	7	7^{9}
5	(Serbia) Dušan Lajović	5	6^{7}
