= 2026 BMW Open – Singles =

Singles
- 2026 BMW Open

Final
- Champion: (United States) Ben Shelton
- Runner-up: (Italy) Flavio Cobolli
- Score: 6–2, 7–5

Details
- Draw: 32 (4 Q / 3 WC)
- Seeds: 8

Events
Singles	Doubles
- BMW Open

Ben Shelton defeated Flavio Cobolli in the final, 6–2, 7–5 to win the singles tennis title at the 2026 Munich Open. It was his fifth career ATP Tour title, and he was the first American man to win a title on clay at the ATP 500 level or higher since Andre Agassi at the 2002 Italian Open.

Alexander Zverev was the defending champion, but lost in the semifinals to Cobolli.

== Seeds ==
1. (Germany) Alexander Zverev (semifinals)
2. (United States) Ben Shelton (champion)
3. (Kazakhstan) Alexander Bublik (first round)
4. (Italy) Flavio Cobolli (final)
5. (Argentina) Francisco Cerúndolo (quarterfinals)
6. (Italy) Luciano Darderi (second round)
7. (France) Arthur Rinderknech (second round)
8. (Netherlands) Tallon Griekspoor (first round)

== Draw ==
Key

- Q = Qualifier
- WC = Wild card
- LL = Lucky loser
- Alt = Alternate
- ITF = ITF entry
- PR = Protected ranking
- SR = Special ranking
- SE = Special exempt
- JE = Junior exempt
- JR = Junior Accelerator Programme entrant
- CO = College Accelerator Programme entrant
- NG = Next Gen Accelerator Program entrant
- w/o = Walkover
- r = Retired
- d = Defaulted

=== Finals ===
Semifinals
1	(Germany) Alexander Zverev	3	3
4	(Italy) Flavio Cobolli	6	6
Q	(Slovakia) Alex Molčan	3	4
2	(United States) Ben Shelton	6	6

Final
4	(Italy) Flavio Cobolli	2	5
2	(United States) Ben Shelton	6	7

=== Top half ===
First round
1	(Germany) A Zverev	6	3	7^{7}
(Serbia) M Kecmanović	3	6	6^{2}
(Canada) G Diallo	6	6
Q	(Ukraine) V Sachko	1	2
(Netherlands) B van de Zandschulp	7^{9}	6
Q	(Switzerland) M-A Hüsler	6^{7}	3
LL	(India) S Nagal	2	2
5	(Argentina) F Cerúndolo	6	6
4	(Italy) F Cobolli	6	7
Q	(Germany) D Dedura	4	5
(Belgium) Z Bergs	6	6
LL	(Germany) M Topo	1	4
WC	(Germany) J Engel	3	7	2
(Czech Republic) V Kopřiva	6	5	6
PR	(China) Z Zhang	6^{5}	6	1
6	(Italy) L Darderi	7^{7}	3	6

Second round
1	(Germany) A Zverev	6	6
(Canada) G Diallo	1	2
(Netherlands) B van de Zandschulp	3	0
5	(Argentina) F Cerúndolo	6	6
4	(Italy) F Cobolli	6	6
(Belgium) Z Bergs	2	3
(Czech Republic) V Kopřiva	2	6	6
6	(Italy) L Darderi	6	4	1

Quarterfinals
1	(Germany) A Zverev	5	6	6
5	(Argentina) F Cerúndolo	7	0	2
4	(Italy) F Cobolli	6	6
(Czech Republic) V Kopřiva	3	2

Semifinals
1	(Germany) A Zverev	3	3
4	(Italy) F Cobolli	6	6

=== Bottom half ===
First round
8	(Netherlands) T Griekspoor	4	6	2
(Canada) D Shapovalov	6	3	6
(Hungary) F Marozsán	3	7^{7}	6
(Greece) S Tsitsipas	6	6^{5}	4
(Croatia) M Čilić	2	3
(Germany) D Altmaier	6	6
Q	(Slovakia) A Molčan	6	6
3	(Kazakhstan) A Bublik	4	2
7	(France) A Rinderknech	6	6
(United States) A Michelsen	3	3
(Chile) A Tabilo	6^{1}	3
(Brazil) J Fonseca	7^{7}	6
WC	(Belgium) A Blockx	7^{7}	6
(Germany) Y Hanfmann	6^{2}	2
LL	(United States) E Nava	6^{4}	6	3
2	(United States) B Shelton	7^{7}	3	6

Second round
(Canada) D Shapovalov	7^{7}	6
(Hungary) F Marozsán	6^{4}	2
(Germany) D Altmaier	4	6^{10}
Q	(Slovakia) A Molčan	6	7^{12}
7	(France) A Rinderknech	3	2
(Brazil) J Fonseca	6	6
WC	(Belgium) A Blockx	4	6^{8}
2	(United States) B Shelton	6	7^{10}

Quarterfinals
(Canada) D Shapovalov	4	4
Q	(Slovakia) A Molčan	6	6
(Brazil) J Fonseca	3	6	3
2	(United States) B Shelton	6	3	6

Semifinals
Q	(Slovakia) A Molčan	3	4
2	(United States) B Shelton	6	6

== Qualifying ==
=== Seeds ===
1. (Kazakhstan) Alexander Shevchenko (first round)
2. (Bosnia and Herzegovina) Damir Džumhur (first round)
3. (United States) Emilio Nava (qualifying competition, lucky loser)
4. (United Kingdom) Jan Choinski (first round)
5. (Italy) Andrea Pellegrino (withdrew)
6. (France) Ugo Blanchet (first round)
7. (Slovakia) Alex Molčan (qualified)
8. (United Kingdom) Arthur Fery (first round)

=== Qualifiers ===
1. (Germany) Diego Dedura
2. (Ukraine) Vitaliy Sachko
3. (Slovakia) Alex Molčan
4. (Switzerland) Marc-Andrea Hüsler

=== Lucky losers ===
1. (United States) Emilio Nava
2. (Germany) Marko Topo
3. (India) Sumit Nagal

=== Qualifying draw ===
==== First qualifier ====
First round
1	(Kazakhstan) Alexander Shevchenko	3	6^{5}
WC	(Germany) Diego Dedura	6	7^{7}
(Italy) Lorenzo Giustino	6	3	0^{r}
Alt	(India) Sumit Nagal	1	6	0

Qualifying competition
WC	(Germany) Diego Dedura	6^{8}	6	6
Alt	(India) Sumit Nagal	7^{10}	3	3

==== Second qualifier ====
First round
2	(Bosnia and Herzegovina) Damir Džumhur	5	4
(Ukraine) Vitaliy Sachko	7	6
WC	(Germany) Max Hans Rehberg	6	7^{7}
8	(United Kingdom) Arthur Fery	2	6^{1}

Qualifying competition
(Ukraine) Vitaliy Sachko	6	7^{7}
WC	(Germany) Max Hans Rehberg	2	6^{3}

==== Third qualifier ====
First round
3	(United States) Emilio Nava	6	6
(Belgium) David Goffin	4	2
(Spain) Roberto Carballés Baena	6	3	4
7	(Slovakia) Alex Molčan	0	6	6

Qualifying competition
3	(United States) Emilio Nava	1	6^{4}
7	(Slovakia) Alex Molčan	6	7^{7}

==== Fourth qualifier ====
First round
4	(United Kingdom) Jan Choinski	4	6	4
(Switzerland) Marc-Andrea Hüsler	6	4	6
WC	(Germany) Marko Topo	6	6
6	(France) Ugo Blanchet	3	4

Qualifying competition
(Switzerland) Marc-Andrea Hüsler	6	6
WC	(Germany) Marko Topo	0	1
