= 2025 Abierto Mexicano Telcel – Doubles =

Doubles
- 2025 Abierto Mexicano Telcel

Final
- Champions: (United States) Christian Harrison (United States) Evan King
- Runners-up: (France) Sadio Doumbia (France) Fabien Reboul
- Score: 6–4, 6–0

Events
Singles	Doubles
← 2024 ·	Mexican Open	· 2026 →

Qualifiers Christian Harrison and Evan King defeated Sadio Doumbia and Fabien Reboul in the final, 6–4, 6–0 to win the doubles tennis title at the 2025 Mexican Open. It was the second ATP Tour title for both players.

Hugo Nys and Jan Zieliński were the reigning champions, but chose not to compete together. Nys partnered Édouard Roger-Vasselin, but lost in the quarterfinals to Harrison and King. Zieliński partnered Sander Gillé, but lost in the first round to Sriram Balaji and Miguel Ángel Reyes-Varela.

== Seeds ==
1. (United States) Jackson Withrow / (Argentina) Horacio Zeballos (first round)
2. (Belgium) Sander Gillé / (Poland) Jan Zieliński (first round)
3. (Monaco) Hugo Nys / (France) Édouard Roger-Vasselin (quarterfinals)
4. (France) Sadio Doumbia / (France) Fabien Reboul (final)

== Draw ==
=== Key ===
- Q = Qualifier
- WC = Wild card
- LL = Lucky loser
- Alt = Alternate
- ITF = ITF entry
- PR = Protected ranking
- SR = Special ranking
- SE = Special exempt
- JE = Junior exempt
- JR = Junior Accelerator Programme entrant
- CO = College Accelerator Programme entrant
- NG = Next Gen Accelerator Program entrant
- w/o = Walkover
- r = Retired
- d = Defaulted

=== Draw ===
First round
1	(United States) J Withrow (Argentina) H Zeballos	6^{1}	4
(Mexico) S González (Austria) L Miedler	7^{7}	6
(Austria) A Erler (Germany) C Frantzen	6	4	[10]
(Uruguay) A Behar (United States) R Galloway	3	6	[5]
3	(Monaco) H Nys (France) É Roger-Vasselin	6	6
(Netherlands) S Arends (United Kingdom) L Johnson	4	1
Q	(United States) C Harrison (United States) E King	7^{7}	6
(Australia) R Hijikata (United States) B Shelton	6^{2}	2
(United States) A Krajicek (United States) R Ram	5	5
(Czech Republic) T Macháč (Czech Republic) J Menšík	7	7
(Italy) M Bellucci (Italy) F Cobolli	6	3	[4]
4	(France) S Doumbia (France) F Reboul	4	6	[10]
(Sweden) A Göransson (Netherlands) S Verbeek	6	3	[8]
WC	(Mexico) H Hach Verdugo (United States) JJ Tracy	3	6	[10]
WC	(India) S Balaji (Mexico) MÁ Reyes-Varela	6	6
2	(Belgium) S Gillé (Poland) J Zieliński	4	2

Quarterfinals
(Mexico) S González (Austria) L Miedler	3	4
(Austria) A Erler (Germany) C Frantzen	6	6
3	(Monaco) H Nys (France) É Roger-Vasselin	6^{5}	4
Q	(United States) C Harrison (United States) E King	7^{7}	6
(Czech Republic) T Macháč (Czech Republic) J Menšík	1^{r}
4	(France) S Doumbia (France) F Reboul	2
WC	(Mexico) H Hach Verdugo (United States) JJ Tracy	7^{7}	2	[8]
WC	(India) S Balaji (Mexico) MÁ Reyes-Varela	6^{5}	6	[10]

Semifinals
(Austria) A Erler (Germany) C Frantzen
Q	(United States) C Harrison (United States) E King	w/o
4	(France) S Doumbia (France) F Reboul	7^{7}	6
WC	(India) S Balaji (Mexico) MÁ Reyes-Varela	6^{4}	3

Final
Q	(United States) C Harrison (United States) E King	6	6
4	(France) S Doumbia (France) F Reboul	4	0

== Qualifying ==
=== Seeds ===
1. (United States) Christian Harrison / (United States) Evan King (qualified)
2. (Argentina) Federico Agustín Gómez / (Mexico) Rodrigo Pacheco Méndez (qualifying competition)

=== Qualifiers ===
1. (United States) Christian Harrison / (United States) Evan King

=== Qualifying draw ===
First round
1	(United States) Christian Harrison (United States) Evan King	6	6
Alt	(Mexico) Alan Magadán (Portugal) Tomás Pinho	4	4
(United States) Marcos Giron (France) Arthur Rinderknech	3	6^{7}
2/WC	(Argentina) Federico Agustín Gómez (Mexico) Rodrigo Pacheco Méndez	6	7^{9}

Qualifying competition
1	(United States) Christian Harrison (United States) Evan King	6	7
2/WC	(Argentina) Federico Agustín Gómez (Mexico) Rodrigo Pacheco Méndez	3	5
