= 2026 BMW Open =

ATP tennis tournament

- Date: 13–19 April
- Edition: 110th
- Category: ATP 500
- Draw: 32S / 16D
- Prize money: €2,561,110
- Surface: Clay
- Location: Munich, Germany
- Venue: MTTC Iphitos

Champions

Singles
- (United States) Ben Shelton

Doubles
- (Germany) Jakob Schnaitter / (Germany) Mark Wallner
- BMW Open

The 2026 BMW Open by Bitpanda was an ATP 500-level tennis event played on outdoor clay courts. It was the 110th edition of the event on the 2026 ATP Tour. It took place at the MTTC Iphitos complex in Munich, Germany, from 13 to 19 April 2026.

== Champions ==
=== Singles ===
- (United States) Ben Shelton def. (Italy) Flavio Cobolli, 6–2, 7–5

=== Doubles ===
- (Germany) Jakob Schnaitter / (Germany) Mark Wallner def. (France) Théo Arribagé / (France) Albano Olivetti, 6–4, 6–7^{(4–7)}, [12–10]

== Point distribution ==
Event	W	F	SF	QF	R16	R32	Q	Q2	Q1
Singles	500	330	200	100	50	0	25	13	0
Doubles	500	300	180	90	0	—N/a	45	25	0

== Singles main draw entrants ==
=== Seeds ===
Country	Player	Rank	Seed
GER	Alexander Zverev	3	1
USA	Ben Shelton	8	2
KAZ	Alexander Bublik	11	3
ITA	Flavio Cobolli	16	4
ARG	Francisco Cerúndolo	19	5
ITA	Luciano Darderi	21	6
FRA	Arthur Rinderknech	27	7
NED	Tallon Griekspoor	32	8

- Rankings are as of 6 April 2026.

=== Other entrants ===
The following players received wildcards into the main draw:

- (Belgium) Alexander Blockx
- (Germany) Justin Engel
- ~~(Germany) Jan-Lennard Struff~~

The following players received entry using a protected ranking:

- ~~(Poland) Hubert Hurkacz~~
- (China) Zhang Zhizhen

The following players received entry from the qualifying draw:

- (Germany) Diego Dedura
- (Switzerland) Marc-Andrea Hüsler
- (Slovakia) Alex Molčan
- (Ukraine) Vitaliy Sachko

The following players received entry as lucky losers:

- (India) Sumit Nagal
- (United States) Emilio Nava
- (Germany) Marko Topo

=== Withdrawals ===
- (United States) Taylor Fritz → replaced by (Czech Republic) Vít Kopřiva
- (Hungary) Márton Fucsovics → replaced by (Germany) Marko Topo
- (Poland) Hubert Hurkacz → replaced by (United States) Emilio Nava
- (United States) Sebastian Korda → replaced by (Netherlands) Botic van de Zandschulp
- (Czech Republic) Jiří Lehečka → replaced by (Germany) Yannick Hanfmann
- (Czech Republic) Jakub Menšík → replaced by (China) Zhang Zhizhen
- (Germany) Jan-Lennard Struff → replaced by (India) Sumit Nagal

== Doubles main draw entrants ==
=== Seeds ===
Country	Player	Country	Player	Rank	Seed
GER	Kevin Krawietz	GER	Tim Pütz	25	1
FRA	Sadio Doumbia	FRA	Fabien Reboul	45	2
SWE	André Göransson	USA	Evan King	56	3
AUT	Alexander Erler	AUT	Lucas Miedler	58	4

- Rankings are as of 6 April 2026.

=== Other entrants ===
The following pairs received wildcards into the doubles main draw:

- ~~(Germany) Yannick Hanfmann / (Germany) Jan-Lennard Struff~~
- (United States) Ryan Seggerman / (United States) Ben Shelton

The following pair received entry from the qualifying draw:

- (Germany) Jakob Schnaitter / (Germany) Mark Wallner

The following pairs received entry as lucky losers:

- (United States) Robert Galloway / (Australia) John Peers
- (Czech Republic) Petr Nouza / (Netherlands) Bart Stevens

=== Withdrawals ===
- (Belgium) Zizou Bergs / (France) Arthur Rinderknech → replaced by (United States) Robert Galloway / (Australia) John Peers
- (Germany) Yannick Hanfmann / (Germany) Jan-Lennard Struff → replaced by (Czech Republic) Petr Nouza / (Netherlands) Bart Stevens
