= Alexander Zverev =

German tennis player (born 1997)

- Zverev in 2026 at the Miami Open
- Country (sports): Germany
- Residence: Monte Carlo, Monaco
- Born: 20 April 1997 (age 29) Hamburg, Germany
- Height: 1.98 m (6 ft 6 in)
- Turned pro: 2013
- Plays: Right-handed (two-handed backhand)
- Coach: Alexander Zverev Sr.
- Prize money: US $76,079,552: 4th all-time in earnings
- Official website: alex-zverev.com

Singles
- Career record: 585–241 (70.8%)
- Career titles: 26
- Highest ranking: No. 1 (2 November 2026)
- Current ranking: No. 1 (9 November 2026)

Grand Slam singles results
- Australian Open: F (2025)
- French Open: W (2026)
- Wimbledon: F (2026)
- US Open: W (2026)

Other tournaments
- Tour Finals: W (2018, 2021)
- Olympic Games: W (2021)

Doubles
- Career record: 79–101
- Career titles: 3
- Highest ranking: No. 68 (18 March 2019)
- Current ranking: No. 107 (9 November 2026)

Grand Slam doubles results
- French Open: 1R (2016)

Other doubles tournaments
- Olympic Games: QF (2021)

Grand Slam mixed doubles results
- US Open: 1R (2025, 2026)

Other mixed doubles tournaments
- Olympic Games: 1R (2024)

Team competitions
- Davis Cup: SF (2025)
- Hopman Cup: F (2018, 2019)
Medal record
Representing Germany
Olympic Games
Gold medal – first place	2020 Tokyo	Singles
- Last updated on: 9 November 2026.

Alexander Zverev (Note: Russian Cyrillic: Александр «Саша» Зверев; German pronunciation: [alɛkˈsandɐ ˈzaʃa ˈtsfɛʁɛf]) (born 20 April 1997) is a German professional tennis player. He is ranked world No. 1 by the Association of Tennis Professionals (ATP). Zverev has won 26 ATP Tour singles titles, including two majors at the 2026 French Open and 2026 US Open, a gold medal at the 2020 Tokyo Olympics, seven ATP Masters 1000 events, and the 2018 and 2021 ATP Finals.

Zverev is a former junior world No. 1, and won a junior major singles title at the 2014 Australian Open. He had an early breakthrough on the professional tour, becoming one of the youngest ATP Challenger Tour title winners in history at the age of 17. As a teenager, Zverev won two ATP titles and upset then–world No. 3 Roger Federer on grass. At 20 years old, he became the youngest player to debut in the top 20 since Novak Djokovic. At the Laver Cup, Zverev played an instrumental role in Team Europe's early success, winning the clinching matches in 2018, 2019, and 2026.

After reaching his first major final at the 2020 US Open, he became an Olympic gold medalist in 2021. He suffered an ankle injury at the 2022 French Open, which required an extended recovery period. He rebounded in the following year to re-enter the top 10, spending 424 weeks there since 2016, and reached five more major finals. In 2026, Zverev enjoyed his most successful season, winning the French Open and US Open.

== Early life and background ==
Alexander Zverev was born on 20 April 1997 in Hamburg, Germany, to Russian parents Irina Zvereva and Alexander Zverev Sr. His older brother, Mischa, born nearly a decade earlier, was also a professional tennis player. Both of his parents were professional tennis players for the Soviet Union. His father, who ranked as high as No. 175 in the world, became the top-ranked men's player nationally, while his mother was the fourth-highest-ranked women's player in the Soviet Union. They both moved from Sochi to the capital to train at the CSKA Moscow military-run tennis club. The Soviet government often restricted their players from competing outside the country, an impediment that limited how high either of Alexander's parents could rise in the world rankings. With the collapse of the Soviet Union imminent, Irina went to Germany to compete at a tournament in 1990, with her husband accompanying as her coach. While in Germany, they were offered jobs as tennis instructors. After initially declining, they accepted an offer to work at the Uhlenhorster Hockey Club in Hamburg the following year and ended up settling in the country.

Zverev, known in his family as Sascha (the Russian-language diminutive for Alexander), started playing tennis at the age of three. Since he began playing tennis at a very young age, he has said, "One day, when I was, I think, one year and five months old, I just picked up a little racket and I was starting to push the ball all over our apartment, and since then, they took me out on the court. I enjoy it still, I enjoyed it back then." When he was five years old, he started to play tennis at least half an hour each day. He was extremely competitive as a child. His brother, Mischa, said, "He would not understand or accept that he was losing," when the two would play against each other. He would never want to leave the court unless he won the match. He also played hockey and football as a child but decided to focus only on tennis around the age of twelve after an early-round loss at a high-level international junior tournament in Florida.

When Alexander was young, his mother was his primary coach while his father was focused on coaching his brother. He has said, "I think I have pretty good technique, which my mum did at a young age, so credit to her for that. My backhand, in particular, is 100 percent down to my mum." While his mother had a more relaxed teaching style, his father "had a very Soviet way of doing physical training sessions" that involved doing timed drills for fixed numbers of repetitions. Alexander's coaches aimed for him to have a riskier, aggressive playing style built around hitting the ball with pace and finishing points quickly. This was a big contrast from how he played around age twelve when his style focused on being an "unbelievable fighter" from the baseline in part because he was too slow to go to the net. Initially, Alexander struggled to change his playing style. He "made a lot of errors" and lost to opponents who excelled at keeping points alive. However, his father stuck with this strategy, saying, "We must practice fast tennis, aggressive tennis. If you lose today it's no big deal. You must think about the future."

== Junior career ==
Zverev played his first junior match in January 2011 at the age of 13 at a grade 4 tournament in Poland. Near the beginning of 2012, Zverev won his first ITF title at the Fujairah Junior Championships, a low-level Grade 4 tournament in the United Arab Emirates. He would pick up a lower level Grade 5 title at the Oman International Junior 2 a few weeks later, which led him to begin competing in higher-level events shortly before his 15th birthday. He did not have much success at tournaments that were Grade 2 and above until the following year when he reached back-to-back doubles finals with Spencer Papa at the Grade A Copa Gerdau and the Grade 1 USTA International Spring Championships.

Zverev's early-season success in doubles proved to be the precursor of a major improvement in singles as well. During the European clay court season, he won his first Grade 1 title over Andrey Rublev at the Open International Junior de Beaulieu-sur-Mer. He followed up that performance with his first Grade A title at the Trofeo Bonfiglio a month later, becoming the youngest boys' singles champion in the tournament's history. He also finished runner-up at the 2013 French Open to Cristian Garín. Zverev had some grass court success as well, finishing runner-up to Nick Kyrgios at the Junior International Roehampton. However, he needed to retire at Wimbledon due to a shoulder injury. Zverev came close to reaching another major boys' singles final at the 2013 Junior US Open, but was defeated by the eventual champion Borna Ćorić in the semifinals. This success was enough for him to take over the No. 1 ranking in late October. Before the end of the season, Zverev also represented Germany in the Junior Fed Cup, leading them to a fourth-place finish. His last tournament of the year was the Grade A Orange Bowl, where he was defeated by Stefan Kozlov in the semifinals. As the top-ranked junior at the end of the season, he was named the ITF Junior World Champion, becoming the youngest boys' champion since Donald Young in 2005.

Zverev played just two tournaments in 2014, both in Australia in January. He won the singles events at both tournaments, the first of which came against Australian Omar Jasika at the Traralgon Junior International. At the Australian Open, he was able to defeat Kozlov, who was seeded second, to finish his junior career with a first major title.

Junior Grand Slam results – Singles:

Australian Open: W (2014)
French Open: F (2013)
Wimbledon: 3R (2013)
US Open: SF (2013)

== Professional career ==
=== 2011–14: ATP semifinal at 17 ===
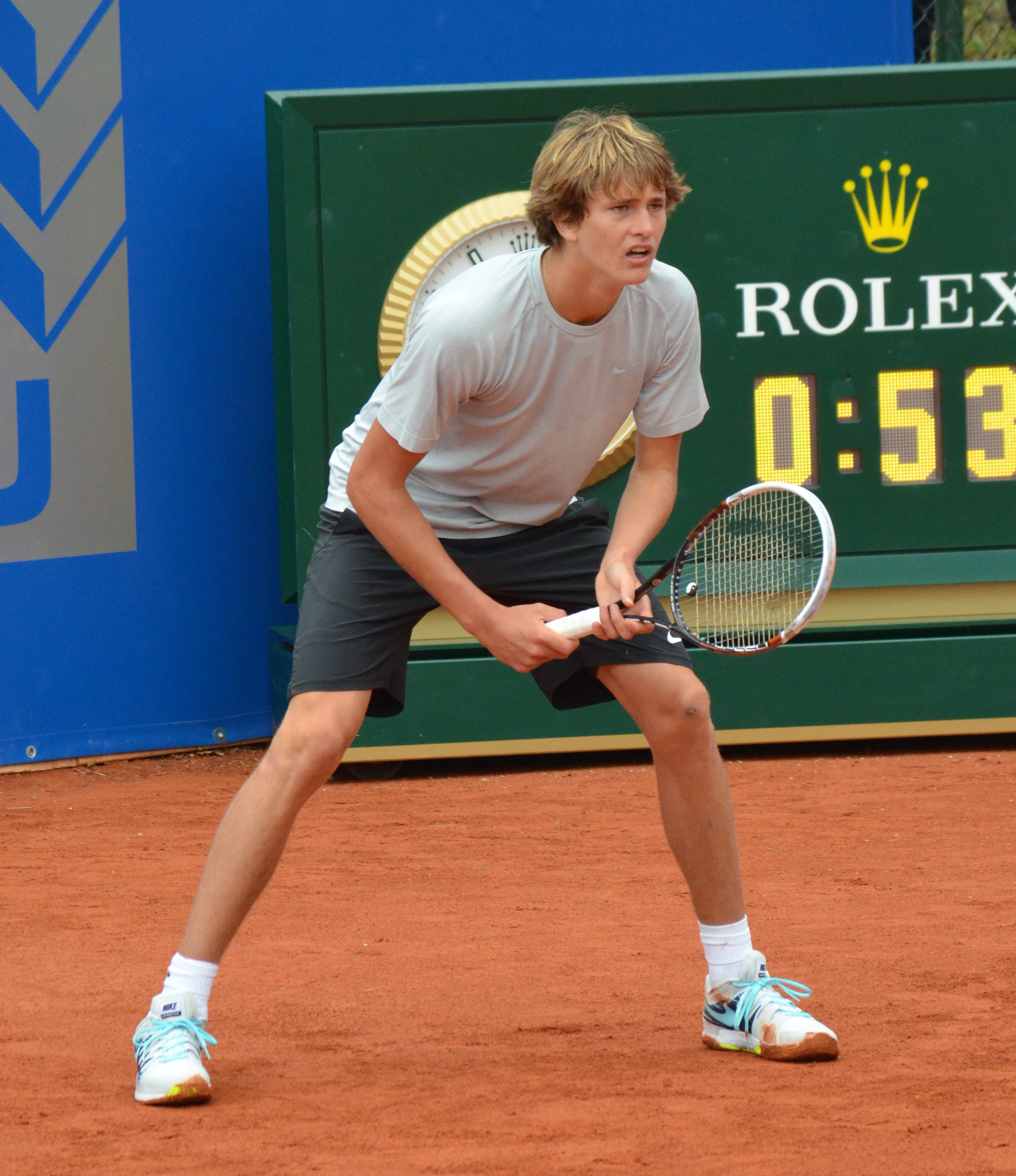
Zverev at the 2014 Bavarian International Tennis Championships

At the age of 14, Zverev entered qualifying at three different tournaments, including the 2011 Moselle Open on the ATP Tour, but lost all of his matches. He won his professional main draw debut against compatriot Christian Lichtenegger at a Futures event in Germany in August 2012. At the end of the year, he made his first professional final, finishing runner-up to Florian Reynet at an ITF $10K event in Florida. Zverev continued to focus on the juniors in 2013 and did not reach another pro-level final that year, but he did make his main draw debut on the ATP Tour in July, losing to Roberto Bautista Agut at his hometown tournament, the International German Open. He also made his ATP Challenger Tour debut, losing to Máximo González at the Meerbusch Challenger in August.

After winning the boys' singles title at the 2014 Australian Open, Zverev shifted his focus to his professional career, only playing in pro events the rest of the year. Initially, he struggled on the pro tour, failing to qualify for the main draw at his first five events of the season. He did not win a main draw match until he recorded a single victory at the Heilbronner Neckarcup Challenger, his tenth event of the year. One of his losses was a retirement against his brother Mischa. Zverev made his first professional breakthrough in July when he won the Braunschweig Challenger for his first professional title, despite entering the tournament with just one career Challenger-level match win and no top 100 victories. Three of the players he defeated were in the top 100, including his first-round opponent No. 87 Tobias Kamke, his semifinal opponent No. 56 Andrey Golubev, and his final opponent No. 89 Paul-Henri Mathieu.

At the age of 17 years and 2 months, he became the youngest player to win a Challenger title since Bernard Tomic in 2009 and the twelfth youngest in history. Zverev followed up this title with a breakthrough at the ATP Tour level. He entered the International German Open having never won an ATP match but managed to reach the semifinals. He recorded four match wins at the event, including his first career victory against Robin Haase and his first top 20 victory over No. 16 Mikhail Youzhny before losing to No. 7 David Ferrer. He became the first 17-year old to defeat a top 20 opponent since Richard Gasquet in 2004 and the first to make a semifinal since Marin Čilić in 2006. Zverev had risen from No. 665 to No. 285 after his Challenger title, and his ATP 500 Series semifinal appearance took him to No. 161 in the world. He finished the season ranked No. 136.

=== 2015: ATP doubles final, top 100 ===
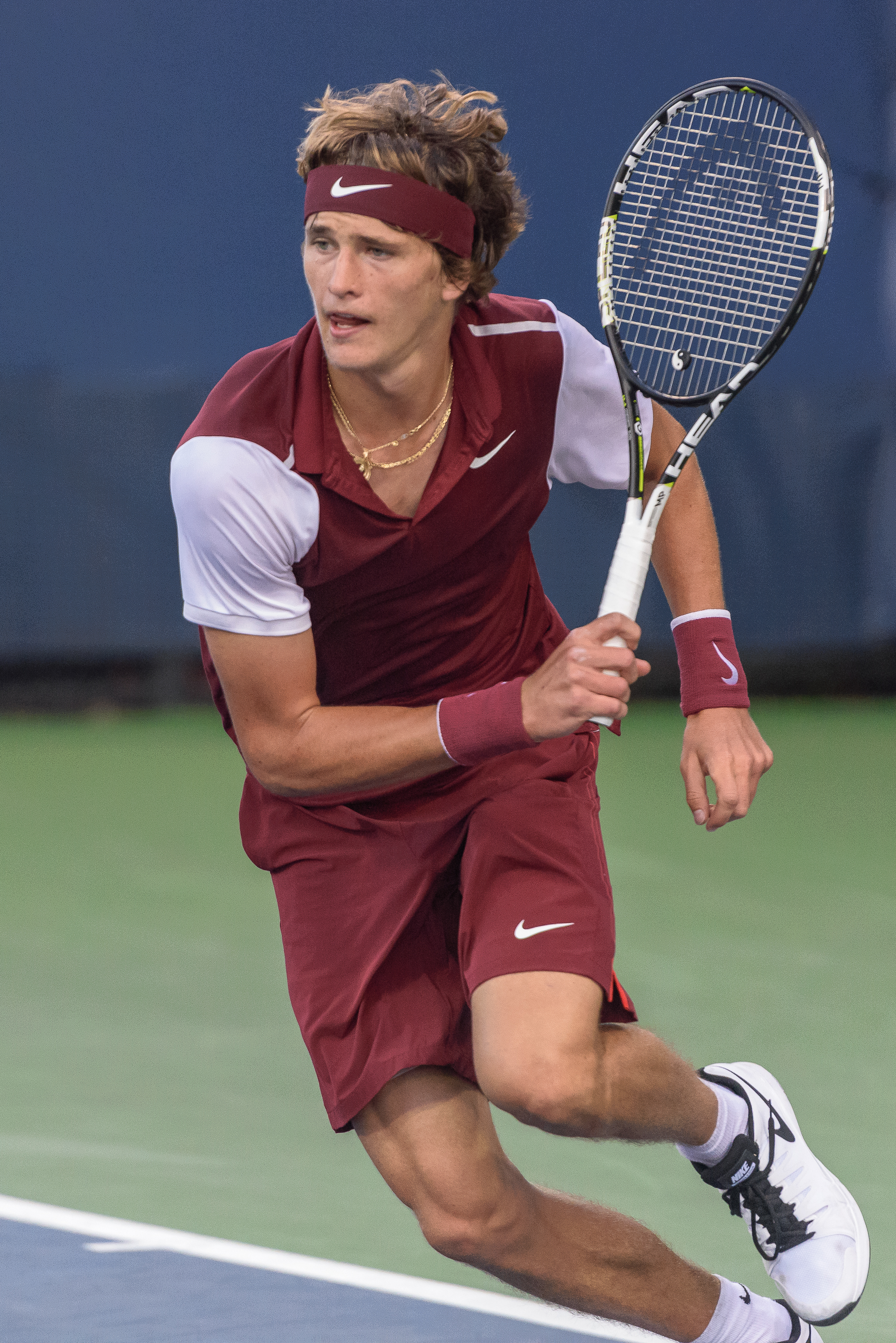
Zverev at the 2015 US Open

At the beginning of the season, Zverev was still ranked too low to receive direct entry into the main draws of ATP Tour events, which forced him to continue playing Challenger events through July. He also needed to enter qualifying for ATP events throughout the year. Zverev did not qualify for either of the first two major singles events of the season. He was able to qualify for his first Masters event at the Miami Open and reached the second round. During the clay-court season, Zverev partnered with his brother Mischa to reach his first career ATP final in doubles at the Bavarian International Tennis Championships. The Zverev brothers finished runner-up to top-seeded Alexander Peya and Bruno Soares. Later that month, he won his second career Challenger title at the Heilbronn Neckarcup to crack the top 100 of the ATP rankings.

With a higher ranking, Zverev was directly accepted into Wimbledon. A week before the tournament, he took part in the Boodles Challenge exhibition and surprisingly upset world No. 1 Novak Djokovic in straight sets. Zverev backed up this performance in his Grand Slam tournament main draw debut, defeating Teymuraz Gabashvili in a tight match that lasted until 9–7 in the fifth and final set. He lost in the next round to Denis Kudla. Zverev opted to play on clay after Wimbledon and reached another ATP semifinal at the Swedish Open to put him back in the top 100 after one week out. In August, Zverev returned to the United States and competed in two US Open Series events. He notably upset No. 14 Kevin Anderson at the Citi Open en route to the quarterfinals. Zverev's brief rankings drop in July meant that he needed to qualify for the US Open. He succeeded, but lost his opening round match to compatriot Philipp Kohlschreiber in five sets. Zverev won just one more main draw match the rest of the season and ended the year ranked No. 83 in the world. As the youngest player in the top 100, he was named the ATP Newcomer of the Year.

=== 2016: First ATP title, Federer upset, top 20 ===
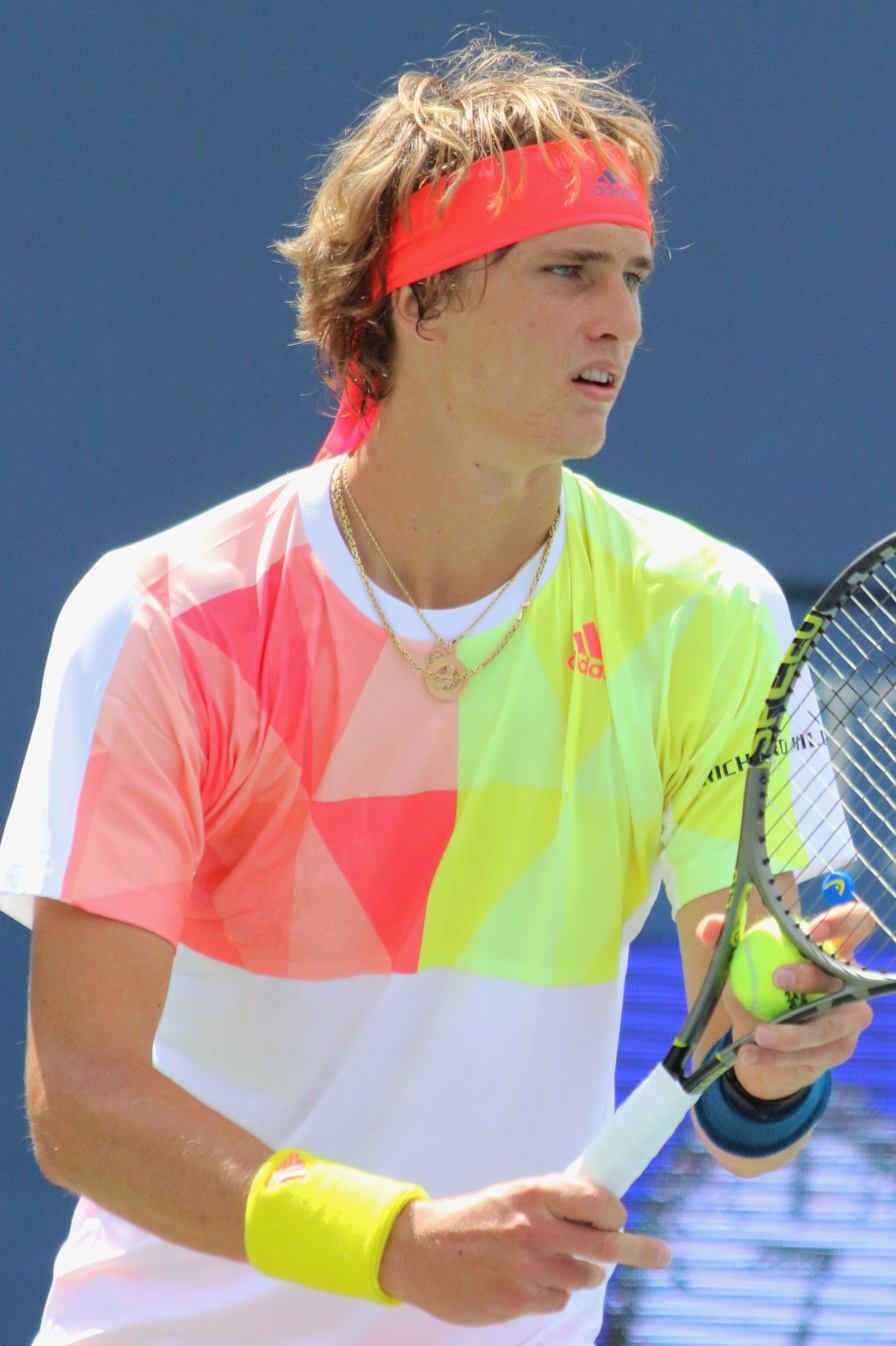
Zverev at the 2016 US Open

Zverev's first ATP event of the year was the 2016 Australian Open, where he had a difficult draw against world No. 2 Andy Murray and was only able to win six games in his opening match. He bounced back at the Open Sud de France, reaching the semifinals in the singles event and his second career final with his brother in the doubles event. During the singles event, he upset No. 13 Marin Čilić, the highest-ranked player he had defeated in an official match at the time. Zverev then produced a strong result at the Indian Wells Masters, where he defeated two top 30 players. In the fourth round, he nearly upset No. 5 Rafael Nadal. Zverev had a match point while he was serving for the final set, but missed a routine forehand volley and then proceeded to lose 14 of the remaining 15 points in the match. He commented on the match point that, "I missed probably the easiest shot I had the whole match." Back in Europe, Zverev was able to recover as he reached his first ATP singles final at the Open de Nice Côte d'Azur, finishing runner-up to No. 15 Dominic Thiem, the top seed and defending champion. Thiem also defeated him in the third round of the French Open.

"I haven't really grasped it yet. That I would be standing here as a winner, I couldn't have imagined it yesterday... It's unbelievable to get a win against Roger, especially on grass."

— Zverev on his victory against Federer at the Halle Open.

Zverev's next breakthrough came during the grass court season at the Halle Open, where he upset world No. 3 Roger Federer in the semifinals, ending Federer's streak of ten consecutive appearances in the final while competing at the tournament. He was also the first teenager to defeat Federer since Murray nearly a decade earlier. Nonetheless, he finished runner-up at the event to veteran compatriot Florian Mayer. After this final, he entered the top 30 for the first time and stayed ranked in the 20s for the rest of the season. Despite being seeded at a major tournament for the first time, Zverev could then only match his best major singles result at Wimbledon, again falling to Berdych. During the US Open Series, he reached the semifinals of the Washington Open, but lost his opening round matches at both Masters events. He was then upset in the second round of the US Open by Dan Evans.

After the US Open, Zverev returned to Europe and won his first career ATP title at the St. Petersburg Open. He recorded his first win over No. 9 Berdych in the semifinals, and No. 3 Stan Wawrinka in the final, coming back from 0–3 down in the third set. At his next event, he then defeated No. 10 Thiem in the first round of the 2016 China Open for the first time in four tries this year. In doing so, Zverev became the first teenager to record three consecutive victories against top ten opponents since Boris Becker in 1986. Zverev's third round appearance at the Shanghai Masters then helped him rise to No. 20 in the ATP rankings, making him the youngest player to debut in the top 20 since Novak Djokovic in 2006.

=== 2017: Two Masters titles, world No. 3 ===
During the 2017 season, Zverev greatly improved his results at the higher level tournaments on the ATP Tour except for the four major events. It was at this time Zverev, who had been using his nickname Sascha, stated in a postmatch interview with Pam Shriver, that he would no longer be referred to as Sascha. Zverev stated that only his close family can refer to him as Sascha, as he was born in Germany and identifies as a German, and does not want a Russian nickname to be used for his professional career. At the Australian Open, Zverev again pushed Rafael Nadal to the brink, but ultimately lost in five sets. His next ATP tournament was the Open Sud de France, where he won both the singles and doubles events. He and his brother defeated Fabrice Martin and Daniel Nestor for Alexander's first doubles title. The following month, he made his first Masters quarterfinal at the Miami Open, upsetting No. 3 Stan Wawrinka along the way. Nick Kyrgios defeated him at both Masters events that month.

After a slow start to the clay court season, Zverev won two more titles in May, the first of which came at home in Germany at the Bavarian International Tennis Championships. He then followed up a second Masters quarterfinal at the Madrid Open with his first Masters title at the Rome Masters. He defeated Novak Djokovic in the final to become the youngest Masters champion since Djokovic in 2007 and the first such champion born in the 1990s. With the title, he also entered the top 10 for the first time. Despite his triumph in Rome, he lost his opening round match at the French Open. During the grass court season, Zverev made another singles final and again faced Federer at the Halle Open, but could not defeat him this time. He and his brother also finished runner-up in the doubles event to Łukasz Kubot and Marcelo Melo. At Wimbledon, he achieved his best result at a major event to date, ultimately losing in the fourth round to the previous year's runner-up Milos Raonic in a tight five-set match.

Back on hard courts, Zverev won his last two titles of the season in August. He won the Washington Open as well as a second consecutive Masters title at the Canadian Open, only dropping a single set at each tournament in each of his opening matches. Notably, he needed to save three match points in his first match in Canada against Richard Gasquet, including a 49 shot rally. He then defeated Roger Federer in the final to become the first player outside of the Big Four to win multiple Masters titles in the same season since David Nalbandian in 2007. Despite this success, he was upset in the second round of the US Open by fellow Next Gen player Borna Ćorić. At the end of the season, Zverev qualified for both the inaugural Next Generation Finals as one of the top seven 21-and-under players, and the ATP Finals as one of the top eight players in the world. He opted to skip the former event to focus on the latter. At the ATP Finals, Zverev was grouped with Roger Federer, Marin Čilić, and Jack Sock. He defeated Čilić in his first match, but lost his final two matches and did not advance out of his round robin group. Zverev finished the year ranked No. 4, peaking at No. 3 right before the ATP Finals, and accumulated five ATP titles from just six finals.

=== 2018: ATP Finals champion ===
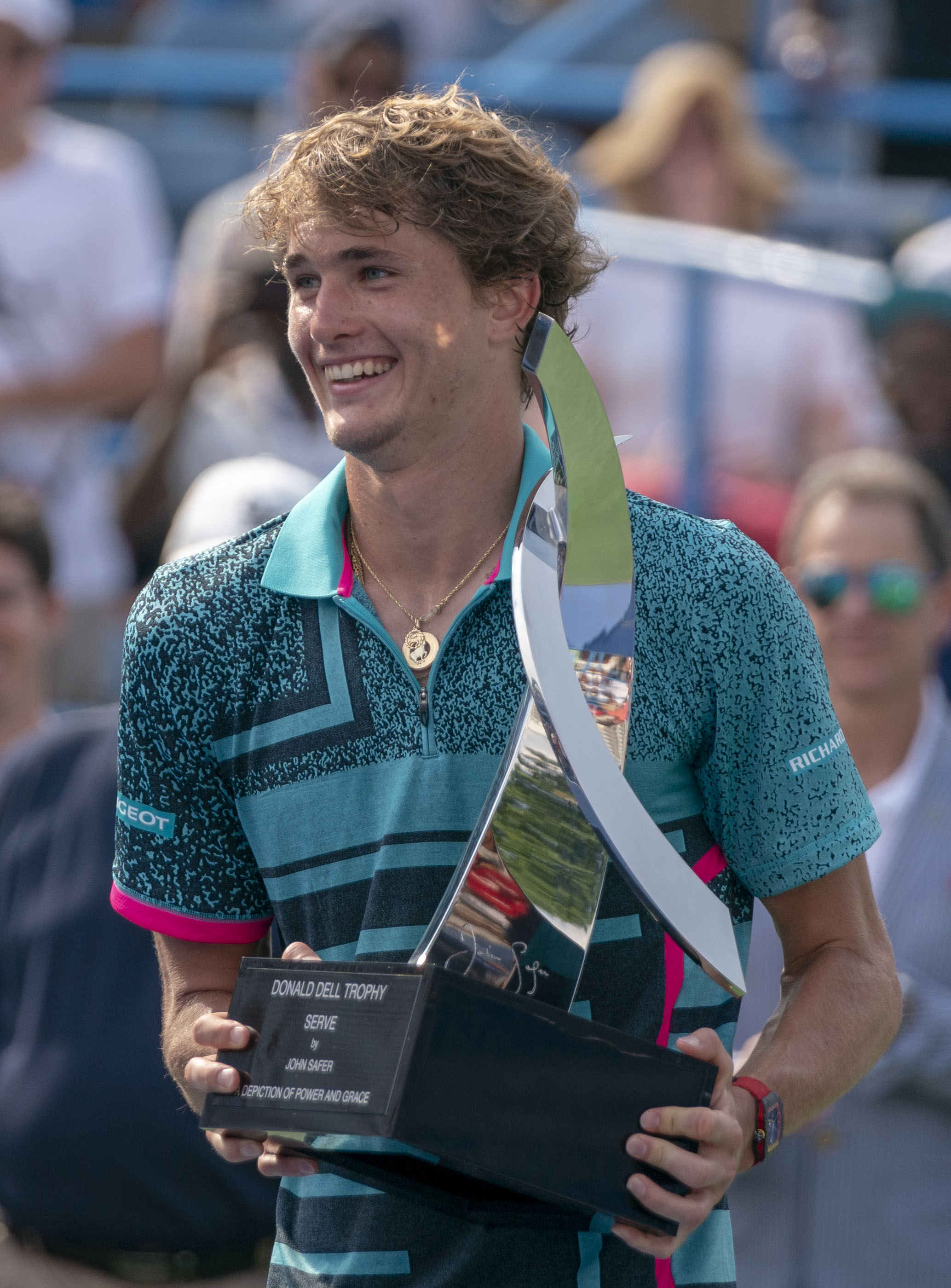
Zverev with the champion's trophy at the 2018 Washington Open

Zverev maintained his top 5 ranking throughout the year. However, he still did not deliver any high-calibre results at the major tournaments. He was upset at the Australian Open by reigning Next Gen Finals champion and No. 59 Chung Hyeon in five sets in the third round. Zverev stated that issues at majors were "definitely not physical" when asked if his problems were physical or mental, and also attributed this lack of success to the extra pressure he was putting on himself at these events. Zverev did not reach his first final of the year until early April at the Miami Masters. Despite taking the first set of the final, he finished runner-up to American John Isner, who had never previously won a Masters title.

Zverev continued his Masters success into the clay-court season, reaching the semifinals at the Monte Carlo Masters, winning his third career Masters title at the Madrid Open, and making the final at the Rome Masters. In Madrid, he defeated Dominic Thiem in the final to become the only active player outside of the Big Four to have won three Masters titles. He came close to winning back-to-back Masters events, going up a break in the third set against Nadal at the Italian Open. However, Nadal was able to recover and win the final five games of the match after a rain delay. Zverev had also defended his title at the Bavarian International Tennis Championships in his only other French Open tune-up to help build up a 13 match win streak that lasted until the Italian Open final. He capped off his excellent clay court season by reaching his first major quarterfinal at the French Open. He needed to win three five-set matches to get that far before Thiem ended his run while he was faced with a hamstring injury.

Up until the year-end championships, Zverev struggled to build on his early season success. He lost in the third round at both Wimbledon and the US Open, and his best result at the four remaining Masters events was a semifinal at the Shanghai Masters. He was able to defend his title at the Washington Open, his only title during this period. Zverev also reached two more doubles finals with his brother, but did not win either of them. At the end of the season, Zverev qualified for both the Next Generation Finals and the ATP Finals for the second consecutive year, again choosing to only compete at the latter event. He was placed in a group with Novak Djokovic, Marin Čilić, and John Isner. This year, Zverev was able to advance out of the group, only losing to No. 1 Djokovic in the round robin. He faced Federer in the semifinals and defeated him in straight sets to set up a rematch with Djokovic. Despite being a heavy underdog and having just lost to Djokovic earlier in the week, Zverev won the final in straight sets for the tenth and biggest title of his career. He became the youngest tour champion since Djokovic a decade earlier and the first German to win the season-ending championships since Boris Becker in 1995. This was also Zverev's first victory over a current world No. 1 player.

=== 2019: Sixth Masters final ===
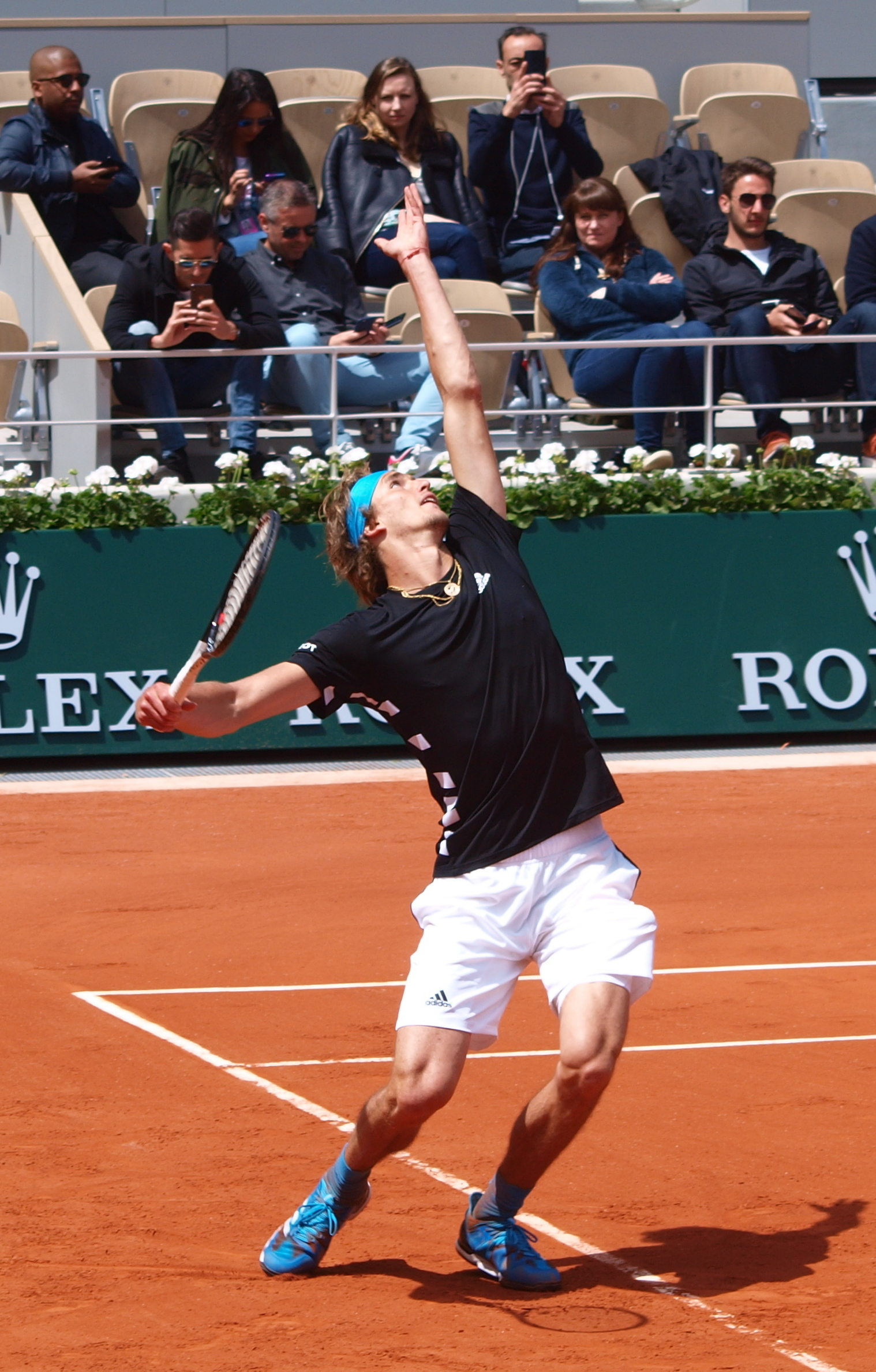
Zverev at the 2019 French Open

Zverev opened his 2019 season with a fourth round appearance at the 2019 Australian Open, defeating Jérémy Chardy in five sets in the second round before losing to Milos Raonic in straight sets. Zverev next played at the Mexican Open and finished runner-up to Nick Kyrgios. Following this tournament, he did not win more than one match at any of his next six events, a streak that ended with two match wins at the Madrid Open. Nonetheless, Zverev finished the clay court season strong. The week before the French Open, he won his only title of the year at the Geneva Open, defeating Nicolás Jarry in the final after saving two match points in the third set tiebreak. He then went on to defeat No. 12 Fabio Fognini and reach his second consecutive quarterfinal at the French Open, where he lost to Novak Djokovic. Zverev did not follow through on that success into the grass court season, where his best result was a quarterfinal at the Halle Open. He was upset in the first round at both the Stuttgart Open and Wimbledon, the latter of which to qualifier Jiří Veselý. Zverev attributed his early season struggles to being distracted by a legal dispute with his former agent Patricio Apey, with whom he had split in the offseason.

Zverev began to turn his season around following Wimbledon. He reached the semifinals of the German Open and the quarterfinals at the Canadian Open. He then reached the last 16 at the US Open for the first time, where he lost to seed No. 20 Diego Schwartzman to continue his lack of success at the major tournaments. He had also fallen out of the top 5 in early August for the first time in nearly two years. Zverev's best result of the season came at the Shanghai Masters. He upset No. 3 Roger Federer in the quarterfinals before finishing runner-up to No. 4 Daniil Medvedev, who was playing in his sixth consecutive final. This performance helped him qualify for the ATP Finals at the end of the year. At the event, Zverev was drawn into a round-robin group with Rafael Nadal, Stefanos Tsitsipas, and Daniil Medvedev. He defeated Nadal for the first time in his opening match before losing to Tsitsipas. He then won his match against Medvedev, which he had needed to win to advance via the tiebreak criteria. Nonetheless, he could not defend his title, losing to Dominic Thiem in the semifinals. Zverev finished the season at No. 7 in the world.

=== 2020: US Open final ===
Zverev began his 2020 season at the inaugural ATP Cup. Germany was in Group F alongside Australia, Greece, and Canada. Against Australia, he lost to Alex de Minaur in three sets. Australia won the tie over Germany 3–0. Against Greece, he was defeated by Stefanos Tsitsipas. Germany won the tie over Greece 2–1. Against Canada, he was beaten by Denis Shapovalov. Canada won the tie over Germany 2–1. Germany ended third in Group F. Seeded seventh at the Australian Open, he first defeated Marco Cecchinato in the first round in straight sets. After the match, he pledged to donate all his prize money from the tournament to relief efforts for the ongoing bushfires if he won the title, a total of A$4.12 million. He then defeated Egor Gerasimov, Fernando Verdasco, and 17th seed Andrey Rublev to reach the quarterfinals without dropping a set. He defeated 15th seed and 2014 champion, Stan Wawrinka, in the quarterfinals in four sets to reach his first major singles semifinal. He fell in his semifinal match to fifth seed, Dominic Thiem, in four sets.

During the week of 24 February, Zverev played at the Mexican Open. Seeded second, he was upset in his second-round match by qualifier Tommy Paul. Starting from 12 March through early August, the ATP suspended tournament play due to the COVID-19 pandemic. At the US Open, Zverev was seeded fifth. He defeated Kevin Anderson in four sets, then beat 19-year old Brandon Nakashima in four sets. In the third round, he beat Adrian Mannarino in four sets before beating Alejandro Davidovich Fokina in straight sets. In the quarterfinals, he beat Borna Ćorić in four sets to reach his second major semifinal. There, he lost the first two sets to Pablo Carreño Busta, but came back to win the match in five; this was his first-ever match win from two sets down. He thus advanced to his first major final, where he faced Dominic Thiem. He became the runner-up, losing the final in a final-set tiebreaker despite leading by two sets and twice coming within two points of the title in the final set.

Zverev was seeded 6th at the French Open. He beat Dennis Novak, Pierre-Hugues Herbert, and Marco Cecchinato, before losing in four sets to Jannik Sinner. In October, he won two consecutive ATP 250 events in Cologne, which took place in the 2020 ATP Tour because of the cancellation of several tournaments due to the COVID-19 pandemic. In the finals, he defeated Félix Auger-Aliassime and Diego Schwartzman, both in straight sets. Zverev then reached the final of the Paris Masters, beating Nadal in straight sets in the semifinals, where he lost to Daniil Medvedev in three sets. In the ATP Finals, Zverev was eliminated in the group stage after a three-set win over Diego Schwartzman, and straight-set losses to Djokovic and the eventual champion Medvedev.

=== 2021: Olympic gold, second ATP Finals title ===
Zverev began his season in February with the ATP Cup, where he represented Germany with Jan-Lennard Struff, Kevin Krawietz and Andreas Mies to reach the semi-finals. In his first Grand Slam tournament appearance at the 2021 Australian Open, he defeated Marcos Giron, Maxime Cressy, Adrian Mannarino and Dušan Lajović. His run ended in the quarterfinals, where he lost to the eventual champion and world No. 1 Novak Djokovic. In March his first tournament was in Rotterdam, where he lost in the first round to Kazakh Alexander Bublik. He continued his performances in Acapulco, where he won his 14th ATP title by defeating Stefanos Tsitsipas in the final. At the tournament in Miami, he lost in the second round to Finland's Emil Ruusuvuori.

At his first tournament in 2021 on clay in Monte Carlo, Zverev finished in the third round, losing to David Goffin. In Munich, he reached the quarterfinals, losing to the 107th ranked tennis player in the world, Ilya Ivashka. At the Madrid Open, Zverev defeated Rafael Nadal, Dominic Thiem, and Matteo Berrettini en route to his fourth Masters 1000 title and 15th career title. At the same tournament, he also reached his first semifinal in doubles at a Masters 1000, partnering with compatriot Tim Pütz, but withdrew from the match. He reached the quarterfinals of the Masters 1000 in Rome, losing to eventual tournament winner Rafael Nadal. In his second Grand Slam tournament of the year – in Paris, where he was seeded No. 6 – he won against Oscar Otte, Roman Safiullin, Laslo Đere, Kei Nishikori and Alejandro Davidovich Fokina. In the semifinal, he played Stefanos Tsitsipas, to whom he lost after a 5-set battle.

Zverev's first appearance on grass started with a tournament at home in Halle – he lost in the second round to the eventual tournament winner Ugo Humbert. At Wimbledon, seeded No. 4, he equaled his best achievement at the tournament to date – reaching the fourth round for a second time. Along the way he defeated Tallon Griekspoor, Tennys Sandgren and Taylor Fritz. He was defeated in the fourth round by Félix Auger-Aliassime in five sets. Following this run he returned to the top 5 after 2 years on 12 July 2021. At the Olympics, Zverev beat Yen-hsun Lu, Daniel Elahi Galán, Nikoloz Basilashvili and Jérémy Chardy to reach the semifinals. In the semifinals, despite being a set and a break down against world No. 1 Novak Djokovic, Zverev rallied to break back and won eight games in a row on his way to win in three sets. He defeated Karen Khachanov in straight sets in the final to claim the Olympic gold medal. Zverev became the first German man to win a gold medal in singles and the first to win a medal since Tommy Haas won his silver medal at the 2000 Sydney Olympics.

Following the Olympics, Zverev reached his second Masters 1000 final of the year at the 2021 Western & Southern Open after defeating Lloyd Harris, Guido Pella, Casper Ruud and Stefanos Tsitsipas after a close three-set battle in the semifinal. Zverev had not won a match at the tournament in six prior appearances. He beat Andrey Rublev for the 17th title of his career and the fourth of the season, in 59 minutes, the shortest match in the tournament history. At the US Open, Zverev sought to claim his first major title following his run to the final the previous year. He reached the semifinals following wins over Jack Sock and Lloyd Harris. There, he lost to Novak Djokovic in five sets despite taking the first set, ending his career-high 16-match win streak stretching back to the Olympics.

Zverev was seeded 3rd at the 2021 BNP Paribas Open, where he reached the quarterfinals. On the way, he defeated Jenson Brooksby, Andy Murray and Gaël Monfils. He lost to Taylor Fritz, despite having two match points. At the Erste Bank Open in Vienna, seeded second, he defeated Filip Krajinović and Alex de Minaur to reach the quarterfinals. The victory over De Minaur gave Zverev his 300th ATP tour match win. He then beat Félix Auger-Aliassime and Carlos Alcaraz to reach the final where he won his fifth title of the year and 18th overall, defeating Frances Tiafoe in straight sets.

Zverev was the fourth seed at the 2021 Rolex Paris Masters. He received a bye into the second round, where he defeated Dušan Lajović. He defeated next sixteenth seed Grigor Dimitrov in the third round and sixth seed Casper Ruud in the quarterfinals. He lost in the semifinals to second seed Daniil Medvedev in straight sets. As a result of this run he equaled his singles career-high ranking of World No. 3 on 8 November 2021. For a fifth successive season, Zverev qualified for the 2021 ATP Finals in Turin, as the third seed. He began his campaign by defeating home favourite Matteo Berrettini who retired with an injury. On his way to the title he defeated the top two seeds Djokovic and Medvedev in the semifinals and finals respectively. Due to this win, he became the only player active to have won multiple ATP Finals titles (2) other than Djokovic and Roger Federer, with 7 and 6, respectively.

=== 2022: World No. 2, ankle injury ===
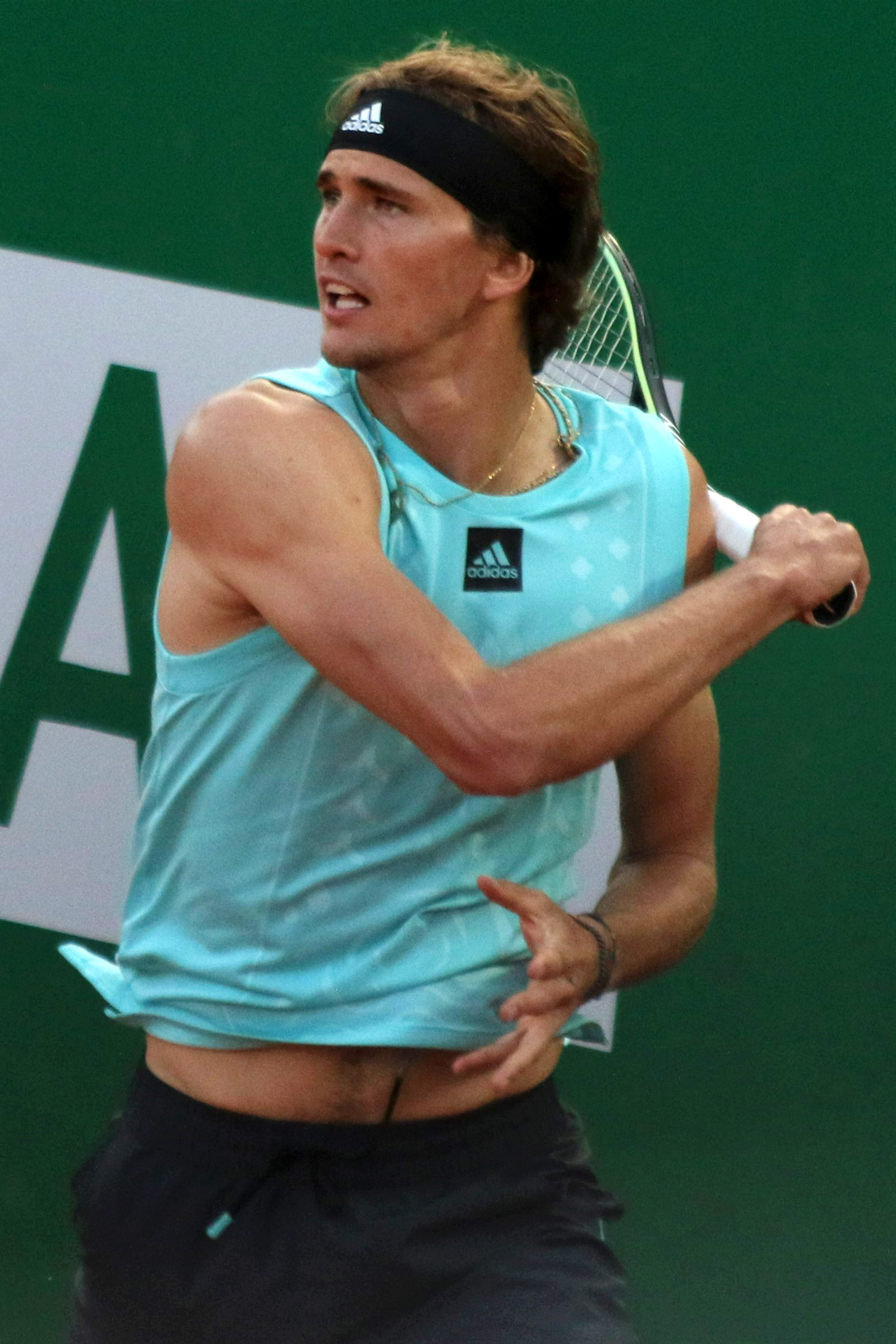
Zverev at the 2022 Monte-Carlo Masters

Zverev started his 2022 season by representing Germany at the ATP Cup. Germany was in Group C alongside Great Britain, the US, and Canada. Against Great Britain, he beat Cameron Norrie. Great Britain ended up winning the tie over Germany 2–1. Against the US, he defeated Taylor Fritz. Germany won the tie 2–1 over the USA. Against Canada, he lost to Félix Auger-Aliassime in three sets. Canada won the tie over Germany 2–1. Germany not only failed to qualify for the semi-finals, but they also ended third in Group C. Seeded third at the Australian Open, he reached the fourth round where he was defeated by 14th seed, Denis Shapovalov, in straight sets.

After the Australian Open, Zverev played at the Open Sud de France. As the top seed, he made it to the final where he lost to sixth seed Alexander Bublik. Seeded second at the Mexican Open, Zverev played in what was the record latest match ever played, defeating Jenson Brooksby at 4:55 A.M. He was then defaulted from the tournament ahead of his following match against compatriot, Peter Gojowczyk, for violently and repeatedly hitting the umpire's chair with his racket after his loss in doubles. Representing Germany in the Davis Cup tie against Brazil, he won both of his matches by beating Thiago Seyboth Wild and Thiago Monteiro. Germany ended up winning the tie over Brazil 3–1 to qualify for the Davis Cup Finals. Seeded third at the Indian Wells Masters, he was stunned in his second-round match by Tommy Paul. However, in doubles, he and partner, Andrey Golubev, reached the semifinals where they lost to eventual champions John Isner and Jack Sock. Seeded second at the Miami Open, he reached the quarterfinals where he lost to sixth seed, world No. 8, and eventual finalist, Casper Ruud, in three sets.

Zverev started his clay-court season at the Monte-Carlo Masters. Seeded second, he reached the semifinals after beating ninth seed and world No. 12, Jannik Sinner, in the quarterfinals in a three-set thriller. He lost in the semifinals to third seed, world No. 5, defending champion, and eventual champion, Stefanos Tsitsipas, in straight sets. As the top seed at the BMW Open in Munich, he was upset in the second round by world No. 70 and eventual champion, Holger Rune. Seeded second at the Madrid Open, he returned to defend his title. He reached the semifinals with a straight set win over eighth seed and world No. 10, Félix Auger-Aliassime, in the quarterfinals, after a tough three sets match win over Marin Čilić in the second round and Lorenzo Musetti's retirement in the third round due to a leg injury. In the semifinals, he took revenge on fourth seed, world No. 5, two-time Monte-Carlo champion, and 2019 finalist, Stefanos Tsitsipas, to reach his third final at this Masters 1000 event. He improved his ATP Head2Head record to 4–7 against Tsitsipas, earning his first clay-court win against him in the process. In the final, he was defeated by seventh seed and world No. 9, Carlos Alcaraz. Seeded second at the Italian Open, he reached the semifinals defeating Cristian Garín in the quarterfinals. In the semifinals, he faced fourth seed, Stefanos Tsitsipas, again for the third consecutive time at this Masters level in the clay court season. He lost his semifinal match to Tsitsipas in three sets.

Seeded third at the French Open, Zverev matched his semifinal result from the previous year, defeating sixth seed, Carlos Alcaraz, in the quarterfinals in what was his first top-10 victory at a major after 12 attempts. In his semifinal match against fifth seed, former world No. 1, and 13 time Roland Garros champion, Rafael Nadal, he retired 3 hours and 13 minutes into the match after rolling his right ankle and tearing all three lateral ligaments. He was rolled off the court in a wheelchair. Zverev announced that the injury would cause him to miss the 2022 Wimbledon Championships and on 8 June 2022 underwent surgery to repair the torn ligaments in his ankle. Despite his exit at Roland Garros, he reached a career-high ranking of world No. 2 on 13 June 2022. In September, he was due to return for the Davis Cup play but suffered a new injury, a bone edema, and withdrew from competition for the rest of the season. Zverev ended the year ranked 12, his lowest in five years, when he debuted in the top 10 and remained a fixture there.

=== 2023: French Open semifinals, Hamburg title ===
Zverev returned to the tour for the first time since his ankle injury by participating at the inaugural United Cup where he lost in straight sets to Jiří Lehečka and Taylor Fritz. Seeded 12th at the Australian Open, he won his first match since June 2022 by beating lucky loser, Juan Pablo Varillas, in the first round in five sets. He was defeated in the second round by American and lucky loser, Michael Mmoh, in four sets.

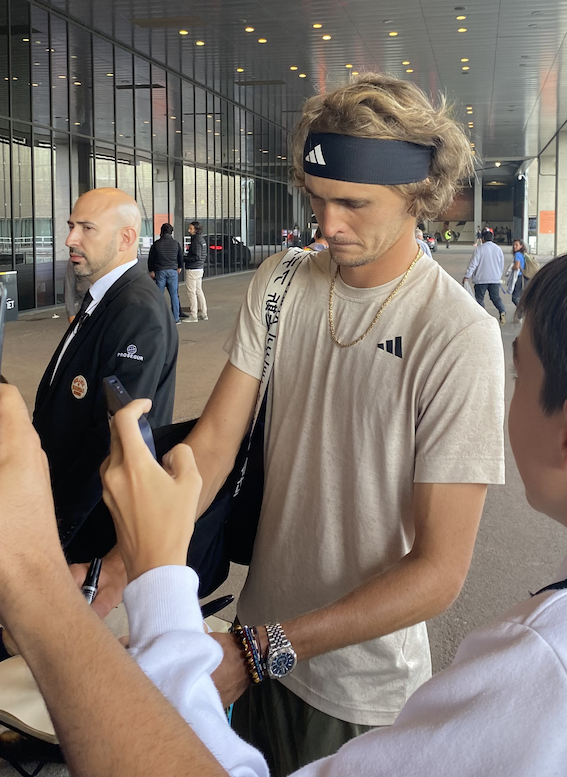
Zverev signing autographs for fans at the 2023 Mutua Madrid Open

After the Australian Open, Zverev represented Germany in the Davis Cup tie against Switzerland. He won his first match over Stan Wawrinka. He lost his second match to Marc-Andrea Hüsler. Switzerland ended up winning the tie over Germany 3–2. Seeded eighth at the Rotterdam Open, he was eliminated from the tournament in the second round by Dutch wildcard, Tallon Griekspoor, in three sets. Seeded fourth at the Qatar ExxonMobil Open, he fell in the second round to wildcard, former world No. 1, two-time champion, and eventual finalist, Andy Murray. In March, he played at the Dubai Championships. Seeded seventh, he reached the semifinals where he lost to second seed, defending champion, and eventual finalist, Andrey Rublev. Zverev began his early U.S. hard court campaign at the Indian Wells Masters. Seeded 12th, he reached the fourth round but lost to fifth seed, world No. 6, and eventual finalist, Daniil Medvedev, in three close sets. Seeded 13th at the Miami Open, he was beaten in the second round by wildcard Taro Daniel.

Zverev began his clay-court season at the Monte-Carlo Masters. Seeded 13th, he earned his first victory over Alexander Bublik by beating him in the first round in three sets. In the second round, he defeated world No. 29, Roberto Bautista Agut, in the second round. In the third round, he lost to third seed, Daniil Medvedev, despite serving for the match twice and having two match points in the third-set tie-break. This defeat was his seventh out of the last eight matches played with Medvedev. Seeded third at the BMW Open in Munich, he was defeated in the second round by Christopher O'Connell. Seeded 13th at the Madrid Open, he recorded his 350th career win by defeating Roberto Carballés Baena in the second round, becoming the only player under 30 to reach this milestone. In the third round, he overpowered qualifier, Hugo Grenier, in 55 minutes. In the fourth round, he lost to top seed, world No. 2, defending champion, and eventual champion, Carlos Alcaraz, in a rematch of the previous year's final. Failing to defend his finalist points from last year, his ranking fell from 16 to 22. Seeded 19th at the Italian Open, he made it to the fourth round where he lost to third seed and eventual champion, Daniil Medvedev. Having made the semifinals last year, his ranking again fell, this time from 22 to 27. Seeded third at the Geneva Open, he reached the semifinal where he lost to Nicolás Jarry, who would end up winning the tournament. Seeded 22nd at the French Open, he defeated Lloyd Harris, Alex Molčan, 12th seed Frances Tiafoe, and 28th seed Grigor Dimitrov in his first four rounds. In the quarterfinals, he faced Tomás Martín Etcheverry. He prevailed over Etcheverry in four sets to reach his third consecutive semi-final at this tournament. He fell in his semi-final match to world No. 4 and last year finalist, Casper Ruud, in straight sets.

Zverev began his grass season by withdrawing from the BOSS Open in Stuttgart due to a thigh injury that he picked up during his semifinal match at Roland Garros. Zverev then defeated Dominic Thiem, Denis Shapovalov, and Nicolas Jarry in Halle to reach the semifinals where he lost to eventual champion Alexander Bublik. At Wimbledon, Zverev lost in third round to Matteo Berrettini. In Båstad, Zverev lost in the quarterfinals to Andrey Rublev. Zverev won the Hamburg European Open, defeating Laslo Djere in the final. His triumph marked his 20th career ATP Title.

During his 2023 US Open match against Jannik Sinner, Zverev halted play and complained to officials in response to a fan shouting the opening stanza to "Deutschlandlied", a song which has served as the national anthem of Germany; the use of the first and second stanza are presently commonly discouraged because of history. Alexander Zverev interpreted this as carrying Nazi sentiment and told officials that the fan had shouted, "the most famous Hitler phrase". Zverev lost the quarterfinals match against Carlos Alcaraz after winning a 4-hour 40 minutes five-set match against Jannik Sinner. This match, in combination with the Roland Garros 2023 semi-final, cemented Zverev's return to top form.

His performance in the Asian swing was marked by his 21st title in Chengdu, defeating Roman Safiullin in three sets. He followed this result with a semifinals showing in Beijing, losing to Danill Medvedev in their 5th meeting of the year. Unable to maintain his form, he lost in the second round of the Shanghai Masters against Roman Safiullin, where he was the defending finalist from 2019, and lost to Jordan Thompson in Tokyo. During the European indoor hardcourt season, Zverev made the quarterfinals in Vienna before losing to Andrey Rublev in three sets and reached the third round in Paris, losing to Stefanos Tsitsipas. Despite this, he qualified for the ATP Finals for the first time since 2021. At the event, he was drawn in the red group and defeated Carlos Alcaraz in three sets and Andrey Rublev in straight sets whilst losing to Medvedev. He failed to qualify for the semifinals after Alcaraz and Medvedev were more successful in terms of win-loss percentage in sets, ending his 2023 season.

=== 2024: United Cup champion, two Masters titles and French Open final ===
Alongside Team Germany, Zverev competed and won the United Cup, saving two championship points in his singles match against Hubert Hurkacz and defeating Team Poland in the final. In Melbourne, he reached the quarterfinals of the 2024 Australian Open, defeating Dominik Koepfer, Lukas Klein for his 400th career win, Alex Michelsen, and Cameron Norrie, with two matches requiring deciding set tiebreakers. He then achieved his first-ever win against a top-5 player at a Grand Slam, defeating Carlos Alcaraz in four sets in the quarterfinals, to make his first Australian Open semifinal appearance since 2020. He subsequently lost to Danill Medvedev, despite being two sets to love up. His defeat marked only his second loss from being up two sets to love in a 5-set match, his first being against Dominic Thiem in the final of the 2020 US Open.

In Mexico, Zverev reached the semifinals in Los Cabos with straight sets wins against Yoshihito Nishoka and Thanasi Kokkinakis but lost to Jordan Thompson in a deciding set tiebreaker. In Acapulco, Zverev lost to Daniel Altmaier in the first round. Seeded sixth at the BNP Paribas Open, Zverev reached the quarterfinals for the first time since 2021, defeating Christopher O'Connell, Tallon Griekspoor, and Alex de Minaur before losing to eventual champion Carlos Alcaraz. Seeded fourth at the Miami Open, Zverev reached the semifinals, defeating Félix Auger-Aliassime, Christopher Eubanks, Karen Khachanov, and Fábián Marozsán before losing to Grigor Dimitrov. This was his best result in Miami since reaching the final in 2018.

Zverev began his 2024 clay season seeded fifth at the Monte-Carlo Masters, receiving a bye into the second round and defeating Sebastian Ofner before losing to eventual champion Stefanos Tsitsipas in the third round. As the top seed at the BMW Open, Zverev received a bye into the second round and beat Jurij Rodionov before being upset by world No. 106 Cristian Garín in the quarterfinals. Seeded fourth in Madrid, Zverev reached the fourth round, beating Borna Ćorić and Denis Shapovalov before being upset by 21st seed Francisco Cerúndolo. Seeded third in Rome, Zverev won his sixth Masters title, defeating Aleksandar Vukic, Nuno Borges, Taylor Fritz, Alejandro Tabilo, and Nicolás Jarry in the final. This was his best result in Rome since winning his first Masters 1000 title at the 2017 Italian Open, and his first Masters title since 2021.

At the French Open, Zverev contested Rafael Nadal's final match at the French Open, defeating the 14-time champion in straight sets to record Nadal's fourth ever defeat at the event. He went on to reach the semifinals, winning over David Goffin, Tallon Griekspoor, Holger Rune, and Alex de Minaur. He then defeated two-time finalist Casper Ruud to reach his first Major final since the 2020 US Open and his first on clay. In the deciding set of the final match, Alcaraz hit a second serve which was called out by the line judges. However, the chair umpire overruled the call, declaring the ball in. While electronic review later indicated the serve was out, Roland Garros does not use Hawk-Eye as an official officiating tool; instead, the technology is used exclusively for television broadcasts. It is noted that the broadcast version of Hawk-Eye operates with significantly lower precision than the official Electronic Line Calling (ELC) systems installed at other tournaments, leaving open the possibility that the umpire's ruling on the clay mark was accurate. However, the overrule generated controversy. Had the call not been overturned, Zverev would have broken back. Tennis commentator Robbie Koenig and former world No. 1 Andy Roddick disagreed with the overrule. Zverev would go on to lose the fifth set, giving up his two-sets-to-one lead and finishing runner-up to Carlos Alcaraz, who collected his maiden French Open title.

In Halle, Zverev reached the semifinals after collecting wins against Oscar Otte, Lorenzo Sonego, and Arthur Fils, losing to Hubert Hurkacz in straight sets. At Wimbledon, Zverev beat Roberto Carballés Baena, Marcos Giron, and Cameron Norrie before losing to Taylor Fritz in the fourth round. His third-set tiebreak with Norrie was noted as one of the longest tiebreaks of the tournament, with Zverev prevailing 17–15 after 26 minutes. Back on clay, Zverev reached the final in Hamburg, losing to Arthur Fils in three sets. At the Olympic Games in Paris, Zverev represented Team Germany as defending champion. He progressed to the quarterfinals after winning over Jaume Munar of Spain, Tomáš Macháč of Czech Republic, and Alexei Popyrin of Australia, all in straight sets. He was defeated in the quarterfinals by eventual bronze medalist Lorenzo Musetti of Italy in straight sets.

In the American hard court swing, Zverev reached the quarterfinals in Montréal, losing to Sebastian Korda in three sets. He went on to defend his semifinal points in Cincinnati, losing to Jannik Sinner in an attritive three-set match. At the US Open, he reached the quarterfinals without facing a seeded opponent, with wins over lucky loser Maximilian Marterer, wildcard Alexandre Müller, Tomás Martín Etcheverry and Brandon Nakashima — his 450th career win. With that milestone, he became the second player born in the 1990s, after Grigor Dimitrov, to reach 450 ATP wins. With the win, he qualified for his seventh appearance at the 2024 ATP Finals. Zverev lost in the quarterfinals to Taylor Fritz.

At the Paris Masters, Zverev defeated Tallon Griekspoor, Arthur Fils, and Stefanos Tsitsipas to set up a semifinal clash with former champion Holger Rune. He won the match in straight sets to reach the final for the second time at this event. Zverev defeated home crowd favorite Ugo Humbert in the final to clinch his second Masters title of the season and the world No. 2 ranking. Zverev won all three of his group matches at the ATP Finals to reach the semifinals, where he lost to Taylor Fritz in a deciding set tie-break.

=== 2025: Australian Open final, 500th win ===
Alongside Team Germany, Zverev failed to defend the United Cup after withdrawing from the event due to injury. Entering the 2025 Australian Open as the second seed for the first time in his career, Zverev began his tournament with a dominant victory over 2019 semifinalist Lucas Pouille in the first round. He reached his second consecutive and third overall semifinal at the Australian Open defeating Pedro Martínez, Jacob Fearnley, Ugo Humbert, and Tommy Paul. Against the 24-time major champion, Zverev won the 81-minute first set against Djokovic before the latter's retirement due to injury, advancing to his third major final. In the final, Zverev lost to defending champion Jannik Sinner in straight sets. Following his defeat to Sinner, a visibly distraught Zverev delivered an emotional speech during the trophy ceremony, stating, "I want to thank my team... I'm just not good enough. It's as simple as that." In the post-match press conference, he reflected on his career trajectory and the pressure of being a perennial contender without a Major title, reportedly remarking that he "didn't want to be the best player in history without a Grand Slam", expressing his desperation to finally break the barrier after losing his third major final.

Over the next two months, Zverev made quarterfinals at the South American events he played in, Buenos Aires and Rio de Janeiro, losing to Argentines Francisco Cerundolo and Francisco Comesana, respectively. Zverev then made only modest achievements in the succeeding weeks, losing to Learner Tien in the second round of the Mexican Open, to Tallon Griekspoor in the second round of Indian Wells, to Arthur Fils in the fourth round of the Miami Open, and to Matteo Berrettini in Monte-Carlo.

In April, Zverev won his 3rd title in Munich and 24th overall on his birthday, winning in straight sets over Ben Shelton. Zverev was presented his BMW trophy by Dominic Thiem, and reclaimed the world No. 2 ranking from Alcaraz. The next week, he reached the round of 16 at the Madrid Open. During his third round match, Zverev was given a code violation for taking a photo of the ball mark of a shot which Zverev considered to have been erroneously called in. Later, social media posts from the ATP Tour suggested that the Hawk-Eye call was correct and that Zverev likely took a picture of a different mark. Following this, Zverev failed to defend either his titles in Rome and Hamburg with a straight sets loss against an in-form Lorenzo Musetti and a three-set loss against Alexandre Müller, respectively. At the French Open where he was defending finalist points, Zverev advanced to the quarterfinals, where he was defeated by Novak Djokovic in a four-set match.

On the grass, Zverev reached his third final of the year in Stuttgart, losing to Taylor Fritz in straight sets in his fifth consecutive loss against the American. He then reached the semifinals against Daniil Medvedev in Halle, losing in three sets. Zverev then lost in the first round of Wimbledon to Arthur Rinderknech in five sets, which marked the first time he lost in the first round of a major since 2019. Zverev reached the semifinals for the first time in Canada since winning the title in 2017 after defeating the defending champion Alexei Popyrin in the quarterfinals. He lost to the eventual finalist Karen Khachanov, despite holding a match point. He rebounded in Cincinnati by advancing to his 3rd consecutive semifinal in the American Midwest, which included wins against the recent finalists from Toronto the week before, Khachanov and Ben Shelton, both of whom were notably exhausted from their Canadian campaigns. Zverev, also struggling and exhausted in his semifinal against Carlos Alcaraz, went on to lose in straight sets. In New York, he was defeated in four sets by a resurgent Félix Auger-Aliassime. Before leaving the United States, Zverev participated in the Laver Cup with Team Europe in San Francisco but lost to Team World.

In the Asian swing, Zverev was defeated by frequent rival Daniil Medvedev in the quarterfinals in Beijing, and by eventual finalist Arthur Rinderknech in the third round in Shanghai. Zverev returned to form in the European indoor swing, but found himself obstructed by Jannik Sinner for the remainder of the season, losing to him in the final in Vienna, the semifinals of Nanterre, and a round-robin match in Turin. At the Davis Cup Finals, Zverev won both of his singles matches, but Germany was defeated in the semifinal tie against Spain. He ended his season ranked world No. 3 behind Sinner and Alcaraz.

=== 2026: French Open and US Open champion, first year-end No. 1 ===
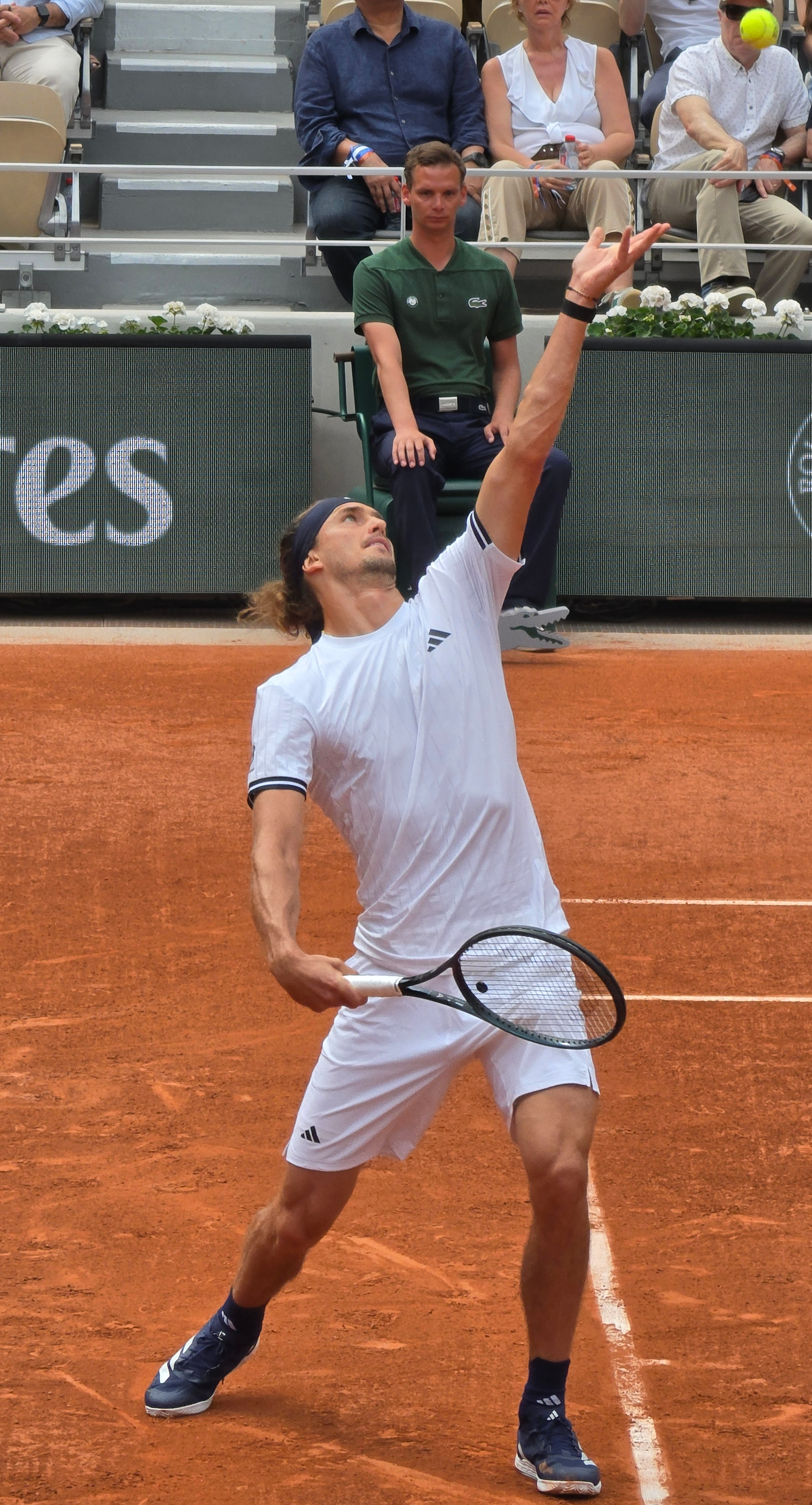
Zverev serving against Jesper de Jong at the French Open.

For the second consecutive year, Zverev and Team Germany failed to progress at the United Cup. At the 2026 Australian Open, Zverev progressed to his third consecutive semifinal, defeating Cameron Norrie, Francisco Cerúndolo, and Learner Tien en route. In a rematch of their quarterfinal match in 2024, Zverev lost to eventual champion Carlos Alcaraz in a five-set epic semifinal lasting five hours and 27 minutes, ranking as the third longest match in Australian Open history. During the semifinal, Zverev dropped the first two sets, but rebounded to win the next two in consecutive tiebreaks to push the match to a deciding set, the first deciding set of the men's tournament on Rod Laver Arena. In the fifth set, Zverev had an opportunity to serve for the match, but was broken twice to lose the match. Failing to defend his finalist points from 2025, he dropped to world No. 4 in the rankings, behind Novak Djokovic.

In Acapulco, Zverev lost in the second round of singles to Miomir Kecmanović. However, in doubles, partnered with Marcelo Melo, the pair took the doubles title, defeating Alexander Erler & Robert Galloway in the final. Zverev then made consecutive Masters 1000 semifinals at Indian Wells, Miami, and Monte-Carlo, improving significantly on his results from the previous year. By reaching his first Indian Wells semifinal, he completed the semifinal set of all nine Masters 1000 tournaments, the first person outside of the Big Four to do so. He went on to lose all three semifinals to the eventual champion of all three events, Jannik Sinner, failing to win a set in any of the three matches and extending his ongoing losing streak to eight consecutive losses against the Italian. Zverev then failed to defend the title in Munich, being defeated by Flavio Cobolli in the semifinals. In Madrid, Zverev advanced to his fourth final in the Magic Box, a first Masters 1000 final of the season for a chance at a third Madrid Open title. He went on to lose to Sinner again in straight sets. The following week, he was upset by home favourite Luciano Darderi at the round of 16 of the Italian Open, ending his run of five successive Masters 1000 semifinals dating back to the Paris Masters.

At the French Open, Zverev won his maiden major title. He entered the tournament as the second seed, after two-time defending champion Carlos Alcaraz withdrew due to an ongoing wrist injury. Following Jannik Sinner's abrupt loss to Juan Manuel Cerúndolo and three-time French Open champion Novak Djokovic's loss to Joāo Fonseca, Zverev was widely labelled the tournament favourite, a label he distanced himself from as the tournament progressed. By reaching his sixth consecutive quarterfinal appearance in Paris, Zverev joined Roger Federer, Rafael Nadal, and Djokovic as the only men's singles players to achieve this feat. He then advanced to his second French Open final and fourth major final following wins against Rafael Jódar in the quarterfinals and Jakub Menšík in the semifinal. In the final, Zverev defeated Flavio Cobolli in a five-set contest, his longest match of the tournament by duration and sets played. With his win, Zverev became the first German men's singles champion since Henner Henkel in 1937, ending an 89 year drought. He became the first German male to win a major since Boris Becker in 1996 and joined Michael Stich and Becker to become the third German men's singles player to win a Major. In addition, he became the first player, male or female, to win a Major with Type 1 diabetes.

Zverev rejoined the tour in Halle, reaching the semifinals just dropping one set to Vit Kopřiva in the second round. He lost the semifinal match to eventual finalist Taylor Fritz despite winning the first set, extending his ongoing losing streak against the American since Wimbledon 2024 to seven consecutive losses. During the 2026 Wimbledon, Zverev reached back-to-back second weeks of a major, and after defeating this time Taylor Fritz in the quarterfinal, and Arthur Fery in the semifinal, he made it to his second consecutive appearance in a Grand Slam final.. In the final, he lost to Sinner in four sets.

Zverev lost his second round match to Tallon Griekspoor at the National Bank Open in 3 sets, then lost his 4th round match at the Cincinnati Masters to Tommy Paul in 3 sets. During the 2026 US Open, Zverev entered as the first seed following Jannik Sinner's withdrawal due to a knee injury. He nearly suffered a first-round defeat, being 2 points away from losing to Lorenzo Sonego in the 4th set while down two sets to one, and serving at 4-5, 30-30. He came back to win the match in 5 sets, and won his second round match against Quentin Halys in five sets. Zverev then earned victories against Alejandro Tabilo, Luciano Darderi, Botic van de Zandshulp, and Karen Khachanov without dropping a single set. He defeated Ben Shelton 6–3, 7–6^{(7–2)}, 5–7, 6–2 in the final, winning his second major title of the season and becoming the first German man to win the US Open since Boris Becker in 1989.

In October, with Sinner withdrawing from the rest of his season, it was announced that Zverev will attain the year-end No. 1 ranking.

At the ATP Finals, Zverev won all three of his round-robin matches, placing first in his group and advancing to the semifinals. He then beat Daniil Medvedev in straight sets to advance to the final.

== Team competitions ==
=== Laver Cup ===
Zverev took part in the inaugural Laver Cup in Prague in 2017. He accrued four points by winning both of his singles matches for Team Europe as they defeated Team World 15–9. He played a more crucial role in 2018 and 2019, winning the clinching matches in both editions against Kevin Anderson and Milos Raonic respectively. In the 2021 edition in Boston, he defeated John Isner in three sets in his only match in Team Europe's 14–1 win. In 2024, Zverev returned to the Laver Cup after a two-year absence in which Team World had won both editions. He lost his first match to Taylor Fritz, but rebounded on the third day to win against Frances Tiafoe in a deciding match tie-break. In 2025, Zverev failed to win any matches against Team World, losing in straight sets to Alex de Minaur and Taylor Fritz, the latter contributing his sixth consecutive loss against the American and allowing Team World to secure their third Laver Cup title. In 2026, Zverev fell again to de Minaur, after being a set and a break up, but won the doubles with Casper Ruud later that day, and triumphed over Learner Tien on the final day to return the Laver Cup to Team Europe, winning his first singles match at the event since 2024, and clinching the event for the fourth time.

Notably, Zverev has played in a record seven Laver Cups, missing only the 2022 and 2023 editions. Additionally, of the seven he has played, Team Europe won the tournament on six of those occasions, meaning Zverev has been present every year Team Europe has won. The 2025 Laver Cup was the only edition where Zverev played but Team Europe was not victorious. He is set to return to the event in 2027.

=== Davis Cup ===
Zverev made his Davis Cup debut for Germany against the Czech Republic in 2016. He faced No. 7 Tomáš Berdych in his debut match and took a two sets to one lead before ultimately losing in five sets. After the Czech Republic won the doubles rubber while Kohlschreiber won both singles matches, Zverev faced Lukáš Rosol in a decisive fifth rubber. Rosol won the match easily to send the Czech Republic into the next round. In the 2017 against Belgium, Zverev recorded his first career match win in the competition against Arthur De Greef, but lost the doubles rubber with his brother as well as his second singles match to Steve Darcis. Belgium won the tie 4–1. Zverev won his first Davis Cup tie in 2018, winning both of his singles matches against Alex de Minaur and Kyrgios to lead Germany to a 3–1 victory over Australia. In the quarterfinals, Germany took a 2–1 lead against Spain behind Zverev's win over David Ferrer and a victory in doubles. However, Spain ultimately won the tie on the final day after Zverev was unable to defeat Nadal and Kohlschreiber lost a tight five-set match to Ferrer.

2019

In 2019, the format of the Davis Cup was changed to have eighteen countries competing in the finals over a single week in November, all but six of which were decided through a qualifying round in February. Germany was placed in the qualifying round and drawn against Hungary. Zverev participated and won both of his singles matches as Germany won the tie 5–0. He did not participate in the finals in November, in which Germany lost in the quarterfinals.

==== 2020–2021 ====
Following the introduction of the revamped Davis Cup Finals format in 2019—which Zverev publicly criticized—he opted not to participate in the competition during the 2020–21 cycle (which was merged into a single edition due to the COVID-19 pandemic). In his absence, Germany defeated Belarus in the 2020 Qualifiers and reached the semifinals of the 2021 Finals in Madrid before losing to the Russian Tennis Federation.

==== 2022 ====
Zverev ended his three-year absence from the competition in March 2022 during the Qualifying Round tie against Brazil on outdoor clay in Rio de Janeiro. He gave Germany an early lead in the opening rubber by defeating Thiago Seyboth Wild in straight sets (6–4, 6–2), before Jan-Lennard Struff fell to Thiago Monteiro to leave the tie level at 1–1 after the first day. On day two, the doubles pairing of Kevin Krawietz and Tim Pütz put Germany ahead 2–1, and Zverev clinched the 3–1 tie victory for Germany by defeating Monteiro (6–1, 7–5). Due to a severe ankle ligament injury sustained at the French Open later that year, Zverev missed both the September group stage and the November Finals, where Germany exited in the quarterfinals.

==== 2023 ====
Returning from injury, Zverev rejoined the squad in February 2023 for the Qualifying Round tie against Switzerland on indoor hard courts in Trier. After Oscar Otte lost the opening rubber to Marc-Andrea Hüsler, Zverev leveled the tie at 1–1 by defeating Stan Wawrinka (6–4, 6–1). On the second day, Andreas Mies and Tim Pütz edged past Dominic Stricker and Wawrinka in three sets (6–7^{(3–7)}, 6–3, 6–4) to give Germany a 2–1 advantage. However, Zverev suffered a straight-sets upset to Hüsler (2–6, 6–7^{(4–7)}) in the fourth rubber, and debutant Daniel Altmaier lost the decisive fifth rubber to Wawrinka (3–6, 7–5, 4–6), resulting in a 2–3 defeat that eliminated Germany from the Finals.

==== 2024 ====
Zverev did not compete in the 2024 Davis Cup. Without him, Germany won its February qualifier against Hungary, advanced out of the September group stage in Zhuhai, and reached the semifinals of the Final 8 in Málaga before losing to the Netherlands.

==== 2025 ====
After sitting out Germany's qualifying ties earlier in the season, Zverev returned to the team in November 2025 for the Davis Cup Final 8 in Bologna, making his first appearance in the final stage of the tournament since 2018. In the quarterfinals against Argentina, Jan-Lennard Struff lost the opening singles rubber to Tomás Martín Etcheverry (6–7^{(3–7)}, 6–7^{(7–9)}) before Zverev defeated Francisco Cerúndolo (6–4, 7–6^{(7–3)}) to level the tie; Kevin Krawietz and Tim Pütz then saved three match points to defeat Andrés Molteni and Horacio Zeballos in the deciding doubles match to secure a 2–1 victory. In the semifinals against Spain, Germany again fell behind 0–1 after Struff lost his opening singles match to Pablo Carreño Busta (4–6, 6–7^{(6–8)}), and Zverev kept the team alive with a two-tiebreak victory over Jaume Munar (7–6^{(7–2)}, 7–6^{(7–5)}). However, Krawietz and Pütz lost the decisive doubles rubber to Marcel Granollers and Pedro Martínez (2–6, 6–3, 3–6), eliminating Germany 1–2 and marking Zverev's best career Davis Cup finish to date.

==== 2026 ====
After missing Germany's 4–0 Qualifying First Round victory over Peru in February, Zverev joined the squad in September 2026 for the Qualifying Second Round against Croatia on indoor hard courts in Halle, less than a week after winning the US Open. On opening day, Zverev defeated Matej Dodig (6–4, 7–6^{(7–3)}) to put Germany ahead, though Daniel Altmaier lost to Dino Prižmić (4–6, 3–6) to leave the tie tied at 1–1. The following day, Kevin Krawietz and Tim Pütz defeated Nikola Mektić and Mate Pavić (7–5, 6–2), and Zverev sealed the 3–1 tie victory with a straight-sets win over Prižmić (6–2, 6–4). The win qualified Germany for the Final 8 in Bologna in late November, where Zverev—now world No. 1—is scheduled to lead Germany against Great Britain in the quarterfinals.

=== Hopman Cup ===
Zverev represented Germany at the Hopman Cup for four consecutive years from 2016 through 2019 with three different partners. In 2016, he competed with Sabine Lisicki. The duo won their tie against the French team, with Zverev winning both his singles and mixed doubles matches. However, they were shut out against Great Britain and Australia Green and did not advance to the final. The following year, he entered the competition with Andrea Petkovic. While the pair only won their tie against Great Britain, Zverev also defeated Federer in singles in his first tournament back from injury.

Zverev enjoyed more success in 2018 and 2019, pairing with Angelique Kerber. In their first year together, they advanced to the final, primarily on the strength of the pair winning all three of their mixed doubles matches. In the final against Switzerland, Zverev lost his singles match to Federer. Although Kerber won her singles match against Belinda Bencic, they lost the decisive mixed doubles rubber. They returned in 2019 and again reached the final to set up a rematch of the previous year's final with Federer and Bencic. In a round-robin group with Australia, France, and Spain, the two of them won all six of their singles matches, but lost two of their three mixed doubles matches against Australia and France. Like the previous year, the final was decided by the mixed doubles match after Federer defeated Zverev and Kerber defeated Bencic. With the Fast4 format, the match went to three sets. In the third set tiebreak, both teams had a match point at 4–4. Switzerland won the point with Federer serving to win the title.

=== ATP Cup ===
Zverev represented Germany at the ATP Cup in 2020 and 2021. At the debut of this tournament in 2020, he was on the team with Jan-Lennard Struff, Kevin Krawietz and Andreas Mies. In the group stage, where Germany met Australia, Canada and Greece, Zverev lost all three matches to Alex de Minaur, Denis Shapovalov and Stefanos Tsitsipas respectively. Germany did not advance to the next phase of the tournament, finishing third in the group. In 2021, Germany played again with the same lineup as the previous year. In the group they played against Canada and Serbia. Zverev won his first match against Denis Shapovalov. In their second meeting, he lost in singles to Novak Djokovic, but still played against him and Nikola Ćaćić in doubles while paired with Jan-Lennard Struff. Germany won that meeting, which allowed them to advance from first place in the group to the semifinals. There they ended up against Russia, where Zverev lost his match to Daniil Medvedev. Germany eventually lost the tie 2–1, allowing Russia to advance to the final.

=== United Cup ===
Zverev has started his season every year since 2023 by participating in the United Cup. In 2023, Zverev and Team Germany were placed in Group C alongside the Czech Republic and the USA. Against the Czech Republic, he lost to Jiří Lehečka. The Czech Republic won the tie over Germany 3–2. Against the US, he lost to Taylor Fritz. The USA beat Germany 5–0. Germany failed to qualify for the knockout round and ended third in Group C. In 2024, Zverev returned to the United Cup in Sydney, Australia for the second consecutive year, leading Team Germany alongside Angelique Kerber. He won both of his singles matches in the round-robin stage, defeating Lorenzo Sonego of Italy and Adrian Mannarino of France both in three sets. He played both mixed doubles matches in both ties with Angelique Kerber, partnering for the first time since 2019, and won against Team Italy but not Team France.

Despite this, Team Germany managed to qualify as the best runner-up team from all countries participating in Sydney, advancing to the quarterfinals against Greece. There, Zverev decisively won his singles match against Stefanos Tsitsipas and his mixed doubles match, partnering with doubles specialist Laura Siegemund, against Maria Sakkari and Petros Tsitsipas. In the semifinal tie against Australia, Zverev was defeated by Alex de Minaur in three sets, allowing the Australian to crack the top 10 after previously making top 10 wins against Taylor Fritz and Novak Djokovic earlier that week. He then participated in the mixed doubles match with Siegemund, against Australia's Storm Hunter and Matthew Ebden. Saving two match points, Zverev and Siegemund won their match in a match tiebreak score of 15–13, and with Kerber's earlier narrow win against Ajla Tomljanovic, Team Germany qualified for the final against Team Poland. After Kerber was unsuccessful against the Polish world No. 1, Iga Swiatek, Zverev made a critical comeback win against Poland's Hubert Hurkacz, saving two championship points in the process and levelled the tie 1–1. Partnering once more with Siegemund, Zverev played the mixed doubles match and successfully defeated the Polish pair of Hurkacz and Swiatek in a decisive match tiebreak and won the United Cup for Team Germany. In the process, he won his first team event since the Laver Cup in 2021.

In 2025, Zverev won his opening round-robin matches against Thiago Monteiro and Zhang Zhizhen but withdrew from his next match due to a bicep strain injury. Team Germany then failed to progress to the quarterfinals, failing to defend their title. In 2026, Zverev defeated Tallon Griekspoor in straight sets and won the mixed doubles match alongside Laura Siegemund to secure the tie over Netherlands. In their next tie against Poland, Zverev lost in straight sets to Hubert Hurkacz, who was making a return from a seven-month hiatus due to injury.

== Playing style ==
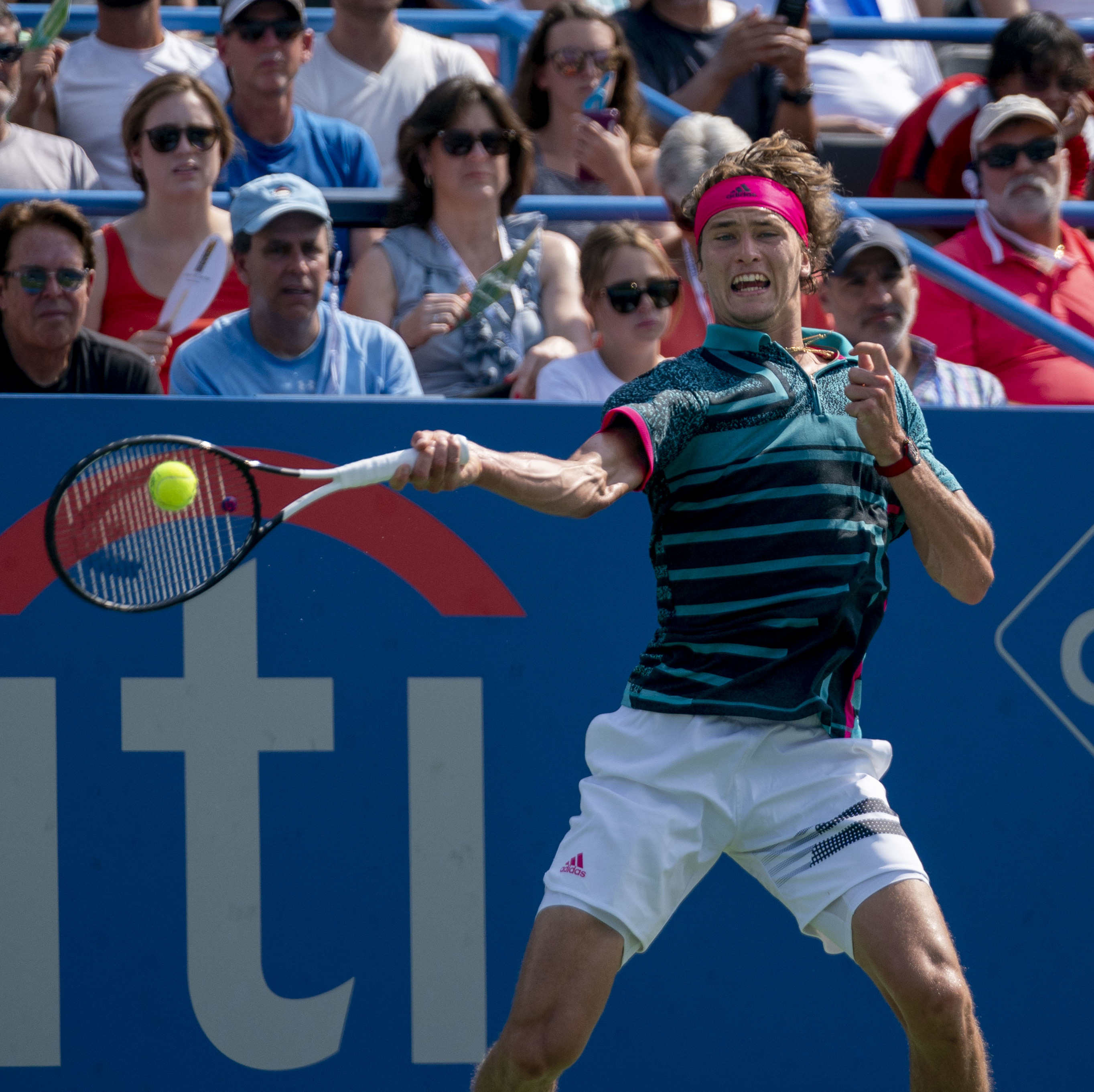
Zverev hitting a forehand

Zverev is a baseline counterpuncher who relies on his massive serve and powerful backhand. He is able to hit strong groundstrokes to open the court, and finish points effectively at the net. Although his height slows him down on the court, it also adds to his reach and gives him the ability to get more balls back in play. Novak Djokovic has commented, "He moves well for his height." His backhand, in particular, is regarded as his strength and one of the best in the game. He can generate a lot of power off it with high accuracy, and his ability to absorb pace makes it one of the best shots in the modern game for both attack and defense. He often uses a semi-open stance and employs a western grip on his forehand. He has a continental-eastern grip on his backhand. Zverev can also slice his backhands that require a low centre of gravity, despite his height. He is often criticized for being too passive in the big moments.

With Zverev's height of 1.98 metres (6 ft 6 in), he can generate big serves at 220 kilometres per hour (140 mph) or faster at sharper angles than shorter players. The year Zverev first broke into the top 20, he was still not one of the better servers on tour, ranking just 38th in serve rating. This was well behind him ranking 18th in return rating, showing that his return game was much stronger than his serving. By 2018, he had improved in both categories, ranking 19th in serve rating and 8th in return rating. Zverev excels in particular at hitting a high percentage of first serves in, landing 64.2% in 2018. In his return game, he had the fifth highest percentage of first serve points won that year at 32.4%. His second serve has been a weakness for him in his earlier years, yet he has managed to turn it into a consistent strength. Zverev hit the most double faults on tour in 2016 and 2020. While it has improved since, it can still cause trouble for the German in big points.

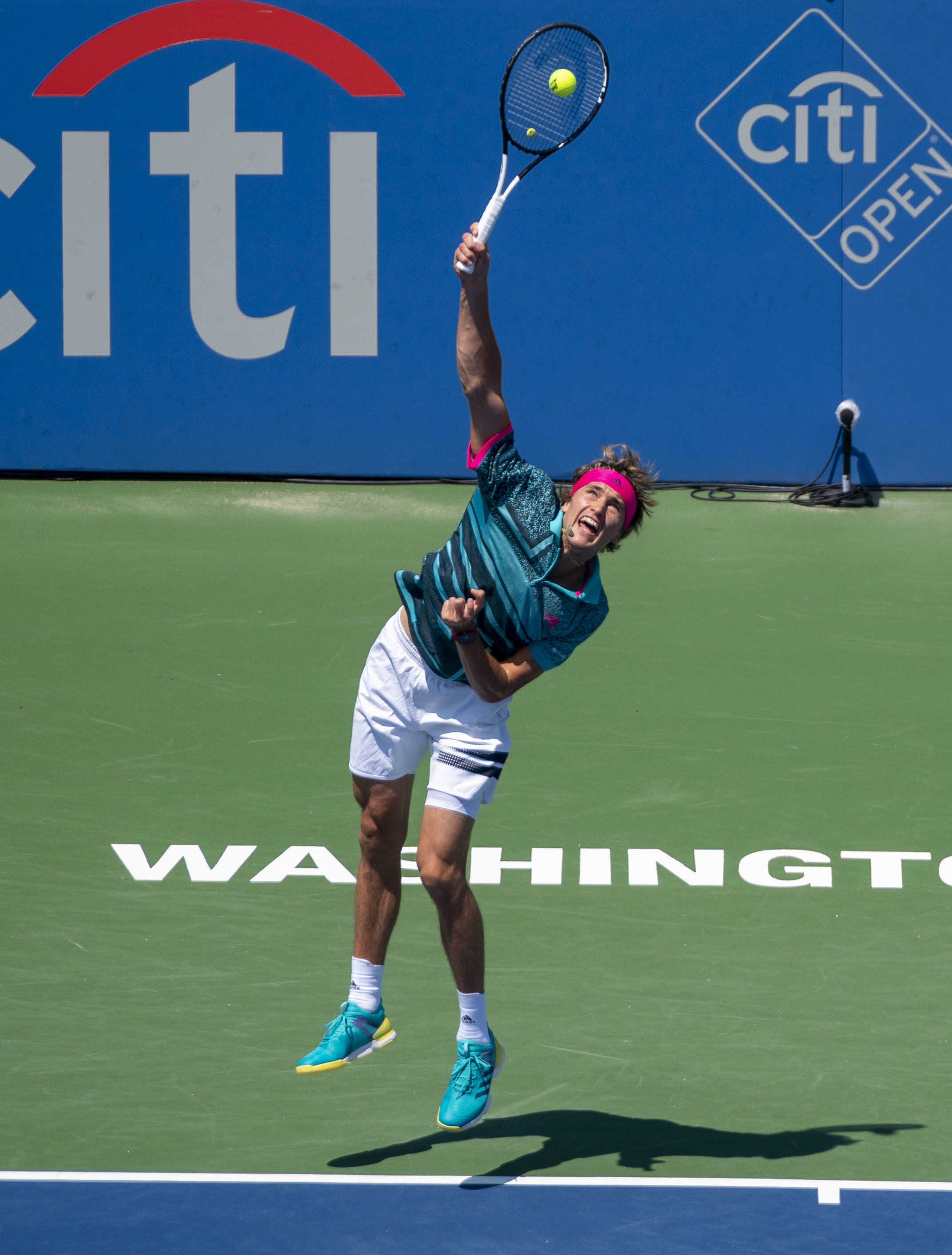
Zverev serving

Zverev is an all-court player and does not aim to be better on any surface in particular. He has said, "I feel like I can play on all surfaces. I've been to two finals or won tournaments on every single surface. I don't feel like I have to focus on one... I feel like I have good chances at all of them." Toni Nadal, the uncle and coach of Rafael Nadal, has praised his ability on hard courts in particular, saying, "His best surface is, in my eyes, the hard court, because he moves better than he does on clay." Six of Zverev's first ten titles came on hard courts, while the other four were on clay. As of 2024, he has yet to win a title on grass, but has reached two finals and defeated Federer on that surface. His best grass tournament remains Halle, in his home country.

Zverev has the ability to serve-and-volley as well. His older brother Mischa is regarded as the biggest proponent of this playing style on the modern tour. Although Zverev does not employ this technique as often as his brother, he has shown it can be effective in big matches such as the Madrid Masters final against Dominic Thiem, a player who rarely comes to the net. Zverev's volley and overhead technique are regarded as some of his biggest weaknesses.

Zverev was tall but skinny and not very muscular when growing up. His fitness trainer Jez Green has focused on making him stronger and set a goal for him to add 4 kilograms (8.8 lb) of muscle each year. Initially, Zverev had difficulty adjusting to this training style on the court, saying, "I had no idea what was going on in my body", and needed to adapt his shot technique as he became more muscular. Eventually, he improved on the court. Green remarked, "He started to become less wobbly. He started to absorb the power, so when someone hit hard he could hit the ball back and everything locked into place."

== Coaching team ==
Zverev has been coached by his parents since he was very young. His mother was initially his primary coach before his father took over at some point. Zverev made the decision to hire former world No. 1 Juan Carlos Ferrero at the Washington Open in the summer of 2017. He fired Ferrero following the 2018 Australian Open after Ferrero criticized the rest of Zverev's coaching team. Ivan Lendl, another former world No. 1, joined Zverev's team in August 2018. They split up in July 2019 due to disappointing results and personal differences. Zverev has stated that Lendl was more interested in his dog or his golf game than in professional coaching. In 2020, Zverev started to work with former World Number 3 and 2013 French Open Finalist David Ferrer. They announced their split in January 2021. Zverev's coaching team also includes physio Hugo Gravil. Fitness trainer Jez Green, who previously worked with Andy Murray, also worked with Zverev beginning 2013. Green departed Zverev's team in 2021 after working with him for around seven years.

== Controversies ==
=== COVID-19 pandemic ===
In June 2020, following Novak Djokovic's Adria Tour, several players tested positive for COVID-19. Due to his possible exposure, Zverev announced on Twitter that he would be following self-isolation procedures after testing negative for the virus. However, one week later, Zverev was captured on video at a party in Monaco, prompting criticism from fellow tennis players Nick Kyrgios and Katie Boulter.

=== First allegation of domestic abuse ===
In an October 2020 article in Racquet magazine by journalist Ben Rothenberg, Zverev's ex-girlfriend Olga Sharypova accused him of physically and emotionally abusing her over the course of their relationship. Sharypova noted multiple instances in which Zverev allegedly became violent towards her, including punching her in the face during an argument in their hotel room while Zverev was competing at the 2019 Laver Cup. Zverev denied the allegations and issued a statement after Sharypova's initial accusations: "I very much regret that she makes such statements. Because the accusations are simply not true." A second article by Rothenberg about the allegations, published in the August 2021 issue of Slate magazine, elaborated on Sharypova's accusations and described an escalation of the alleged violence in October 2019:

Sharypova said she went to take a shower, during which Zverev continued berating her from outside the bathroom door. "When I got out of the shower, I was starting to take a towel and he came and said, 'Pack your stuff right now and leave,'" Sharypova recalled. "I'm just like, 'OK, can you wait a few minutes please? I'm naked here.'" From there, Sharypova said, Zverev attacked her more violently than he ever had before. She said that he grabbed her by the throat and pushed her up against the hard tile wall of the bathroom. "He started to punch me, and this time I understand that I can't be dough for punching," she said.

Rothenberg reported that "Sharypova has repeatedly said that she is not interested in pursuing criminal or civil action against Zverev." She told the journalist that she wanted to be open and honest to help other women who tend to stay silent in such situations due to fear of not being believed. In August 2021, Zverev secured an injunction from a Berlin court against Slate that barred it from publishing the assault allegations without stronger evidence. In response, the magazine stated that it stood by the reporting in the article and has not removed the article from its website. Slate further protested that the injunction was obtained without its having an opportunity to present evidence, and it appealed the decision.

Commentator Mary Carillo stepped down from her presenting role at the 2021 Laver Cup in response to what she viewed as the ATP's weak response to the allegations. Following a 15-month ATP-commissioned investigation conducted by the Lake Forest Group (a third-party consultant working with the ATP's outside legal counsel, Smith Hulsey & Busey), the ATP announced in late January 2023 that it would not punish Zverev due to insufficient evidence to substantiate the allegations.

=== 2022 Mexican Open default ===
After a first-round doubles loss at the 2022 Mexican Open, Zverev repeatedly and violently struck umpire Alessandro Germani's chair with his racket, believing that Germani had incorrectly called a ball out during a tiebreak. Zverev was subsequently defaulted from the tournament, forfeiting all points and prize money that he had won thus far. (Note: Had he earned at least semifinal points at the tournament, Zverev would have reached the world No. 1 ranking for a week in August 2022.) He received the maximum fine of $40,000 by the ATP, an additional $25,000 fine, and a suspended eight-week ban. He was also placed on probation for one year. Zverev later issued an apology on social media.

=== Second allegation of domestic abuse ===
About six months after the ATP declined to take action against Zverev, in July 2023, allegations from a second woman became public through a court filing. The public prosecution office requested a penalty order against Zverev in a Berlin criminal court over alleged bodily harm against Brenda Patea, Zverev's ex-girlfriend and the mother of his daughter. On 2 October 2023, the court issued a summary penalty order against Zverev, which included a fine of €450,000. In Germany, summary orders can be issued, typically without a prior hearing, when a judge considers the evidence sufficient to support the accusation and a trial is not deemed necessary. Zverev lodged an objection against the order, which under German law resulted in a public trial. Patea spoke publicly for the first time about the alleged abuse on 1 November 2023 in an interview with the Süddeutsche Zeitung. She said that during a dispute in May 2020, Zverev pushed her into a wall and choked her.

In January 2024, Zverev was appointed to serve on the ATP Players Advisory Council. The ATP has been criticized for allowing him to serve on the council while the domestic abuse charge is pending in a criminal court. Also in January 2024, Zverev was featured on the second season of the Netflix series Break Point in an episode focused on his comeback from injury. Netflix was criticized for ignoring both allegations of domestic abuse. One columnist argued that "Break Point promised to take viewers behind the curtain of professional tennis and reveal the personalities behind it. That promise is null and void if Zverev – and the media – isn't willing to be honest."

At the beginning of the 2024 Australian Open, a court official announced that Zverev was scheduled to stand trial before the Tiergarten District Court in Berlin. The timing of the announcement, combined with Zverev's semifinal run at the tournament, brought heightened interest in and scrutiny of the allegations from both the press and the public. The trial began on 31 May 2024. On 7 June 2024, the third day of the trial, the judge agreed to a request by the public prosecution office, endorsed by the alleged victim, to provisionally terminate the proceedings subject to the condition that Zverev pay €200,000, of which €150,000 would go to the German State Treasury and €50,000 to charitable organizations. The trial therefore concluded without a finding of guilt. The prosecutor's request to terminate the proceedings followed an out-of-court agreement between Zverev and the alleged victim, the terms of which were not disclosed. According to his counsel, Zverev entered into the agreement "to put a quick end to the proceedings – above all in the interest of their child", emphasizing that the agreement "includes no determination or admission of guilt".

=== Civil lawsuit ===
On 18 September 2026, Brenda Patea – the more recent of Zverev's domestic violence accusers, and mother of his child – filed suit in Berlin over his public mischaracterisations regarding the settlement of their earlier court case. In a L'Équipe interview in June 2026, Zverev claimed his "innocence has been proven"; although the prior domestic abuse trial did not result in a finding of innocence nor of guilt. In response, Patea's legal counsel has contended that "the assertion significantly infringes upon the plaintiff's right to social standing", and has pursued monetary compensation including that for missed child support payments.

== Personal life ==
Zverev lives in Monte Carlo, Monaco. He grew up in Hamburg and also has spent his winters living in Florida at the Saddlebrook Academy. He can speak German, Russian, and English. Zverev has a daughter, Mayla, who was born in 2021 to Brenda Patea, an ex-girlfriend. Both parents reached an out-of-court financial settlement after a lawsuit over alleged physical assault was filed against Zverev by the ex-partner in 2023. Since 2021, Zverev has been dating German actress Sophia Thomalla.

In 2017, Zverev said that his tennis idol is Roger Federer. He is a fan of the Miami Heat and Bayern Munich and wore the jersey of Bayern player Michael Olise during the 2026 BMW Open. In his spare time, he enjoys playing basketball and golf. His best friend on the tennis tour is Brazilian doubles specialist Marcelo Melo. He is also close friends with Dominic Thiem and Andrey Rublev, and has known the latter since childhood. Zverev filed a lawsuit against the ACE Group International and its CEO, Patricio Apey, accusing them of "unlawful restraint of trade". He argued that the contract between them was oppressive, but eventually agreed to settle the dispute out of court before the trial began.

=== Health ===
In August 2022, Zverev announced that he has Type 1 diabetes, having been diagnosed at the age of three. That year, he launched the Alexander Zverev Foundation, a charity to support people with diabetes. During a match at the 2023 French Open, Zverev was not permitted to inject insulin on-court, prompting criticism from the International Diabetes Federation and the JDRF. Tournament organizers later clarified that Zverev would be allowed to inject insulin on-court.

== Career statistics ==
=== Grand Slam tournament performance timeline ===
Key
W	F	SF	QF	#R	RR	Q#	DNQ	A	NH

(W) winner; (F) finalist; (SF) semifinalist; (QF) quarterfinalist; (#R) rounds 4, 3, 2, 1; (RR) round-robin stage; (Q#) qualification round; (DNQ) did not qualify; (A) absent; (NH) not held; (SR) strike rate (events won / competed); (W–L) win–loss record.
To avoid confusion and double counting, these charts are updated at the conclusion of a tournament or when the player's participation has ended.

Current through the 2026 US Open.

Tournament	2014	2015	2016	2017	2018	2019	2020	2021	2022	2023	2024	2025	2026	SR	W–L	Win %
Australian Open	A	Q1	1R	3R	3R	4R	SF	QF	4R	2R	SF	F	SF	0 / 11	36–11	77%
French Open	A	Q2	3R	1R	QF	QF	4R	SF	SF	SF	F	QF	W	1 / 11	45–10	82%
Wimbledon	A	2R	3R	4R	3R	1R	NH	4R	A	3R	4R	1R	F	0 / 10	22–10	69%
US Open	Q2	1R	2R	2R	3R	4R	F	SF	A	QF	QF	3R	W	1 / 11	35–10	78%
Win–loss	0–0	1–2	5–4	6–4	10–4	10–4	14–3	17–4	8–2	12–4	18–4	12–4	25–2	2 / 43	138–41	77%

=== Grand Slam tournaments ===
==== Singles: 6 (2 titles, 4 runner-ups) ====
Result	Year	Tournament	Surface	Opponent	Score
Loss	2020	US Open	Hard	(Austria) Dominic Thiem	6–2, 6–4, 4–6, 3–6, 6–7^{(6–8)}
Loss	2024	French Open	Clay	(Spain) Carlos Alcaraz	3–6, 6–2, 7–5, 1–6, 2–6
Loss	2025	Australian Open	Hard	(Italy) Jannik Sinner	3–6, 6–7^{(4–7)}, 3–6
Win	2026	French Open	Clay	(Italy) Flavio Cobolli	6–1, 4–6, 6–4, 6–7^{(5–7)}, 6–1
Loss	2026	Wimbledon	Grass	(Italy) Jannik Sinner	7–6^{(9–7)}, 6–7^{(2–7)}, 3–6, 4–6
Win	2026	US Open	Hard	(United States) Ben Shelton	6–3, 7–6^{(7–2)}, 5–7, 6–2

=== Year-end championships performance timeline ===
Tournament	2013	2014	2015	2016	2017	2018	2019	2020	2021	2022	2023	2024	2025	2026	SR	W–L	Win %
ATP Finals	did not qualify				RR	W	SF	RR	W	DNQ	RR	SF	RR		2 / 8	18–12	60%

=== Year-end championships (ATP Finals) ===
==== Singles: 3 (2 titles, 1 pending) ====
Result	Year	Tournament	Surface	Opponent	Score
Win	2018	ATP Finals, United Kingdom	Hard (i)	(Serbia) Novak Djokovic	6–4, 6–3
Win	2021	ATP Finals, Italy (2)	Hard (i)	(Russia) Daniil Medvedev	6–4, 6–4
Pending	2026	ATP Finals, Italy	Hard (i)	(Spain) Carlos Alcaraz	

=== Summer Olympics ===
==== Singles: 1 (gold medal) ====
Result	Year	Tournament	Surface	Opponent	Score
Gold	2021	Tokyo Summer Olympics	Hard	(Russia) Karen Khachanov	6–3, 6–1

=== Records ===
- These records were attained in the Open Era of tennis.

Tournament	Years	Record accomplished	Players matched
ATP Tour	2017–2026	Become No. 1, win a Grand Slam, Olympics singles gold medal, the ATP Finals and ATP Masters 1000	Andre Agassi; Andy Murray; Novak Djokovic
Grand Slam tournaments	2026	Reached the finals of the next consecutive major after winning first title	Andy Murray; Daniil Medvedev
Grand Slam tournaments	2026	Reached the finals of the next two consecutive majors after winning first title	Stands alone
Grand Slam tournaments	2026	Won the first and second career majors in the same calendar season	Jimmy Connors; Guillermo Vilas; Jannik Sinner
Grand Slam tournaments	2020–2026	Runner-up finishes at all four majors	Ivan Lendl; Roger Federer; Andy Murray; Novak Djokovic

== Awards and recognition ==
Zverev has received the following awards:

- ATP Newcomer of the Year (2015)
- German Sportspersonality of the Year (2021)

== Notes ==
Sporting positions
Preceded by (Italy) Jannik Sinner	World No. 1; 2 November 2026 –	Succeeded by Incumbent
