= 2024 BMW Open – Singles =

Singles
- 2024 BMW Open

Final
- Champion: (Germany) Jan-Lennard Struff
- Runner-up: (United States) Taylor Fritz
- Score: 7–5, 6–3

Details
- Draw: 28 (4 Q / 3 WC )
- Seeds: 8

Events
Singles	Doubles
← 2023 ·	BMW Open	· 2025 →

Jan-Lennard Struff defeated Taylor Fritz in the final, 7–5, 6–3 to win the singles tennis title at the 2024 Bavarian International Tennis Championships. It was Struff's first career ATP Tour singles title, and he did not drop a set en route. Aged 33 years and 11 months old, Struff became the oldest first-time ATP Tour singles champion since Paolo Lorenzi at the 2016 Austrian Open, as well as becoming the third-oldest first-time ATP Tour champion (after Lorenzi and Victor Estrella Burgos) since its establishment in 1990.

Holger Rune was the two-time defending champion, but lost in the semifinals to Struff.

== Seeds ==
The top four seeds received a bye into the second round.

1. (Germany) Alexander Zverev (quarterfinals)
2. (Denmark) Holger Rune (semifinals)
3. (United States) Taylor Fritz (final)
4. (Germany) Jan-Lennard Struff (champion)
5. (Canada) Félix Auger-Aliassime (quarterfinals)
6. (United Kingdom) Jack Draper (quarterfinals)
7. (Germany) Dominik Koepfer (first round)
8. (Kazakhstan) Alexander Shevchenko (first round)

== Draw ==
Key

- Q = Qualifier
- WC = Wild card
- LL = Lucky loser
- Alt = Alternate
- ITF = ITF entry
- PR = Protected ranking
- SR = Special ranking
- SE = Special exempt
- JE = Junior exempt
- JR = Junior Accelerator Programme entrant
- CO = College Accelerator Programme entrant
- NG = Next Gen Accelerator Program entrant
- w/o = Walkover
- r = Retired
- d = Defaulted

=== Finals ===
Semifinals
(Chile) Cristian Garín	3	4
3	(United States) Taylor Fritz	6	6
4	(Germany) Jan-Lennard Struff	6	6
2	(Denmark) Holger Rune	2	0

Final
3	(United States) Taylor Fritz	5	3
4	(Germany) Jan-Lennard Struff	7	6

=== Top half ===
First round
(Austria) J Rodionov	6	6
(Australia) A Vukic	2	3
WC	(Germany) MH Rehberg	6^{2}	3
(United States) A Michelsen	7^{7}	6
(Chile) C Garín	7^{7}	6
7	(Germany) D Koepfer	6^{3}	3
Q	(Spain) A Moro Cañas	6	6
(Austria) D Thiem	4	4
Q	(Italy) F Passaro	4	2
WC	(Germany) R Molleker	6	6
(Czech Republic) V Kopřiva	1	7	4
6	(United Kingdom) J Draper	6	5	6

Second round
1	(Germany) A Zverev	7^{7}	6
(Austria) J Rodionov	6^{3}	2
(United States) A Michelsen	7^{9}	2	1
(Chile) C Garín	6^{7}	6	6
3	(United States) T Fritz	6	6
Q	(Spain) A Moro Cañas	3	1
WC	(Germany) R Molleker	6	1	1
6	(United Kingdom) J Draper	4	6	6

Quarterfinals
1	(Germany) A Zverev	4	4
(Chile) C Garín	6	6
3	(United States) T Fritz	4	6	7^{7}
6	(United Kingdom) J Draper	6	3	6^{1}

Semifinals
(Chile) C Garín	3	4
3	(United States) T Fritz	6	6

=== Bottom half ===
First round
5	(Canada) F Auger-Aliassime	6^{5}	7^{8}	7^{7}
(Germany) M Marterer	7^{7}	6^{6}	6^{3}
(Japan) T Daniel	6	6
(Australia) C O'Connell	3	4
Q	I Gakhov	4	6	3
(Netherlands) B van de Zandschulp	6	2	6
8	(Kazakhstan) A Shevchenko	7^{8}	3	5
(Germany) Y Hanfmann	6^{6}	6	7
Q	(Switzerland) M-A Hüsler	3	6	6
WC	(Germany) M Topo	6	1	3
(Argentina) C Ugo Carabelli	6^{2}	4
(Colombia) DE Galán	7^{7}	6

Second round
5	(Canada) F Auger-Aliassime	6	6
(Japan) T Daniel	3	2
(Netherlands) B van de Zandschulp	6^{0}	4
4	(Germany) J-L Struff	7^{7}	6
(Germany) Y Hanfmann	2	4
Q	(Switzerland) M-A Hüsler	6	6
(Colombia) DE Galán	4	2
2	(Denmark) H Rune	6	6

Quarterfinals
5	(Canada) F Auger-Aliassime	5	4
4	(Germany) J-L Struff	7	6
Q	(Switzerland) M-A Hüsler	4	6^{3}
2	(Denmark) H Rune	6	7^{7}

Semifinals
4	(Germany) J-L Struff	6	6
2	(Denmark) H Rune	2	0

== Qualifying ==
=== Seeds ===
1. (Italy) Andrea Pellegrino (qualifying competition)
2. (Germany) Rudolf Molleker (received wildcard to main draw)
3. (United Kingdom) Jan Choinski (qualifying competition)
4. (Bosnia and Herzegovina) Nerman Fatić (qualifying competition)
5. (Italy) Francesco Passaro (qualified)
6. Ivan Gakhov (qualified)
7. (Switzerland) Marc-Andrea Hüsler (qualified)
8. (Spain) Alejandro Moro Cañas (qualified)

=== Qualifiers ===
1. (Italy) Francesco Passaro
2. Ivan Gakhov
3. (Switzerland) Marc-Andrea Hüsler
4. (Spain) Alejandro Moro Cañas

=== Qualifying draw ===
==== First qualifier ====
First round
1	(Italy) Andrea Pellegrino	7^{7}	6
(Belgium) Michael Geerts	6^{4}	4
WC	(Germany) Yannik Kelm	3	2
5	(Italy) Francesco Passaro	6	6

Qualifying competition
1	(Italy) Andrea Pellegrino	3	4
5	(Italy) Francesco Passaro	6	6

==== Second qualifier ====
First round
Alt	(Syria) Hazem Naw	1	1
(Germany) Henri Squire	6	6
(Italy) Alexander Weis	6^{4}	1
6	Ivan Gakhov	7^{7}	6

Qualifying competition
(Germany) Henri Squire	3	4
6	Ivan Gakhov	6	6

==== Third qualifier ====
First round
3	(United Kingdom) Jan Choinski	6	6
WC	(Germany) Henri Haupt	1	1
(Italy) Alessandro Giannessi	3	0
7	(Switzerland) Marc-Andrea Hüsler	6	6

Qualifying competition
3	(United Kingdom) Jan Choinski	6^{7}	7^{7}	3
7	(Switzerland) Marc-Andrea Hüsler	7^{9}	6^{4}	6

==== Fourth qualifier ====
First round
4	(Bosnia and Herzegovina) Nerman Fatić	6	6
(Italy) Edoardo Lavagno	4	2
Alt	(Germany) Daniel Masur	7^{7}	4	1
8	(Spain) Alejandro Moro Cañas	6^{5}	6	6

Qualifying competition
4	(Bosnia and Herzegovina) Nerman Fatić	4	2
8	(Spain) Alejandro Moro Cañas	6	6
