= 2024 BMW Open – Doubles =

Doubles
- 2024 BMW Open

Final
- Champions: (India) Yuki Bhambri (France) Albano Olivetti
- Runners-up: (Germany) Andreas Mies (Germany) Jan-Lennard Struff
- Score: 7–6^{(8–6)}, 7–6^{(7–5)}

Events
Singles	Doubles
← 2023 ·	BMW Open	· 2025 →

Yuki Bhambri and Albano Olivetti defeated Andreas Mies and Jan-Lennard Struff in the final, 7–6^{(8–6)}, 7–6^{(7–5)} to win the doubles tennis title at the 2024 BMW Open.

Alexander Erler and Lucas Miedler were the defending champions, but lost in the semifinals to Bhambri and Olivetti.

== Seeds ==
1. (Germany) Kevin Krawietz / (Germany) Tim Pütz (withdrew)
2. (United States) Nathaniel Lammons / (United States) Jackson Withrow (quarterfinals)
3. (Belgium) Sander Gillé / (Belgium) Joran Vliegen (first round)
4. (Uruguay) Ariel Behar / (Czech Republic) Adam Pavlásek (quarterfinals)

== Draw ==
Key

- Q = Qualifier
- WC = Wild card
- LL = Lucky loser
- Alt = Alternate
- ITF = ITF entry
- PR = Protected ranking
- SR = Special ranking
- SE = Special exempt
- JE = Junior exempt
- JR = Junior Accelerator Programme entrant
- CO = College Accelerator Programme entrant
- NG = Next Gen Accelerator Program entrant
- w/o = Walkover
- r = Retired
- d = Defaulted

=== Draw ===
First round
Alt	(Germany) J Schnaitter (Germany) M Wallner	4	4
PR	(New Zealand) M Daniell (Austria) P Oswald	6	6
(Brazil) M Demoliner (Brazil) M Melo	3	2
(France) T Arribagé (Romania) VV Cornea	6	6
4	(Uruguay) A Behar (Czech Republic) A Pavlásek	6	6
WC	(Germany) H Haupt (Germany) M Topo	3	4
(Germany) C Frantzen (Germany) H Jebens	6	2	[9]
WC	(Germany) A Mies (Germany) J-L Struff	3	6	[11]
(United States) R Galloway (United States) E King	6	6
(Australia) J Peers (Australia) J-P Smith	3	4
(India) Y Bhambri (France) A Olivetti	4	7^{7}	[10]
3	(Belgium) S Gillé (Belgium) J Vliegen	6	6^{5}	[6]
(Argentina) G Andreozzi (Mexico) MÁ Reyes-Varela	3	2
(Austria) A Erler (Austria) L Miedler	6	6
(Germany) Y Hanfmann (Germany) D Koepfer	6^{5}	6^{0}
2	(United States) N Lammons (United States) J Withrow	7^{7}	7^{7}

Quarterfinals
PR	(New Zealand) M Daniell (Austria) P Oswald	3	6^{1}
(France) T Arribagé (Romania) VV Cornea	6	7^{7}
4	(Uruguay) A Behar (Czech Republic) A Pavlásek	3	6^{3}
WC	(Germany) A Mies (Germany) J-L Struff	6	7^{7}
(United States) R Galloway (United States) E King	3	3
(India) Y Bhambri (France) A Olivetti	6	6
(Austria) A Erler (Austria) L Miedler	5	6	[10]
2	(United States) N Lammons (United States) J Withrow	7	2	[4]

Semifinals
(France) T Arribagé (Romania) VV Cornea	4	3
WC	(Germany) A Mies (Germany) J-L Struff	6	6
(India) Y Bhambri (France) A Olivetti	6	6^{5}	[10]
(Austria) A Erler (Austria) L Miedler	1	7^{7}	[7]

Final
WC	(Germany) A Mies (Germany) J-L Struff	6^{6}	6^{5}
(India) Y Bhambri (France) A Olivetti	7^{8}	7^{7}
