= 2023 BMW Open – Singles =

Singles
- 2023 BMW Open

Final
- Champion: (Denmark) Holger Rune
- Runner-up: (Netherlands) Botic van de Zandschulp
- Score: 6–4, 1–6, 7–6^{(7–3)}

Details
- Draw: 28 (4 Q / 3 WC )
- Seeds: 8

Events
Singles	Doubles
← 2022 ·	BMW Open	· 2024 →

Defending champion Holger Rune defeated Botic van de Zandschulp in a rematch of the previous year's final, 6–4, 1–6, 7–6^{(7–3)} to win the singles tennis title at the 2023 Bavarian International Tennis Championships. In the third set of the final, Rune recovered from being a double-break down and saved four championship points en route to victory.

== Seeds ==
The top four seeds received a bye into the second round.

1. (Denmark) Holger Rune (champion)
2. (United States) Taylor Fritz (semifinals)
3. (Germany) Alexander Zverev (second round)
4. (Netherlands) Botic van de Zandschulp (final)
5. (Argentina) Sebastián Báez (first round)
6. (Italy) Lorenzo Sonego (second round)
7. (Spain) Roberto Carballés Baena (first round)
8. (Switzerland) Marc-Andrea Hüsler (second round)

== Draw ==
=== Key ===
- Q = Qualifier
- WC = Wild card
- LL = Lucky loser
- Alt = Alternate
- SE = Special exempt
- PR = Protected ranking
- ITF = ITF entry
- JE = Junior exempt
- w/o = Walkover
- r = Retired
- d = Defaulted
- SR = Special ranking

=== Finals ===
Semifinals
1	(Denmark) Holger Rune	6	6
(Australia) Christopher O'Connell	3	2
4	(Netherlands) Botic van de Zandschulp	6	7^{7}
2	(United States) Taylor Fritz	4	6^{2}

Final
1	(Denmark) Holger Rune	6	1	7^{7}
4	(Netherlands) Botic van de Zandschulp	4	6	6^{3}

=== Top half ===
First round
(Brazil) T Monteiro	7^{7}	6^{5}	2
WC	(Germany) Y Hanfmann	6^{3}	7^{7}	6
(Chile) C Garín	6	6
Q	(Germany) M Topo	4	2
(France) Q Halys	6	6^{5}	5
6	(Italy) L Sonego	3	7^{7}	7
(Australia) C O'Connell	6	6
(France) U Humbert	4	4
Q	(Italy) F Cobolli	7	6
(Australia) J Thompson	5	1
(Germany) O Otte	6	7
5	(Argentina) S Báez	3	5

Second round
1	(Denmark) H Rune	6	6
WC	(Germany) Y Hanfmann	3	4
(Chile) C Garín	6	7^{7}
6	(Italy) L Sonego	3	6^{3}
3	(Germany) A Zverev	6^{2}	4
(Australia) C O'Connell	7^{7}	6
Q	(Italy) F Cobolli	6	3	6
(Germany) O Otte	0	6	3

Quarterfinals
1	(Denmark) H Rune	6	6
(Chile) C Garín	2	4
(Australia) C O'Connell	7^{7}	4	6
Q	(Italy) F Cobolli	6^{5}	6	3

Semifinals
1	(Denmark) H Rune	6	6
(Australia) C O'Connell	3	2

=== Bottom half ===
First round
7	(Spain) R Carballés Baena	1	7	2
(United States) M Giron	6	5	6
Q	(Switzerland) A Ritschard	7	7
(Germany) J-L Struff	5	5
Q	A Karatsev	4	7^{7}	6
WC	(Germany) D Altmaier	6	6^{2}	2
8	(Switzerland) M-A Hüsler	7^{7}	4	6
PR	(United Kingdom) K Edmund	6^{3}	6	3
(Austria) D Thiem	6	0
(France) C Lestienne	3	0^{r}
(Hungary) M Fucsovics	4	7^{8}	6
WC	(Germany) MH Rehberg	6	6^{6}	3

Second round
(United States) M Giron	4	6	6
Q	(Switzerland) A Ritschard	6	3	3
Q	A Karatsev	2	0
4	(Netherlands) B van de Zandschulp	6	6
8	(Switzerland) M-A Hüsler	7	4	4
(Austria) D Thiem	5	6	6
(Hungary) M Fucsovics	6	3	3
2	(United States) T Fritz	4	6	6

Quarterfinals
(United States) M Giron	6^{5}	3
4	(Netherlands) B van de Zandschulp	7^{7}	6
(Austria) D Thiem	3	4
2	(United States) T Fritz	6	6

Semifinals
4	(Netherlands) B van de Zandschulp	6	7^{7}
2	(United States) T Fritz	4	6^{2}

== Qualifying ==
=== Seeds ===
1. Aslan Karatsev (qualified)
2. (Czech Republic) Vít Kopřiva (qualifying competition)
3. (Italy) Riccardo Bonadio (qualifying competition, withdrew)
4. (Czech Republic) Zdeněk Kolář (qualifying competition)
5. (Italy) Flavio Cobolli (qualified)
6. (Switzerland) Alexander Ritschard (qualified)
7. (Japan) Shintaro Mochizuki (first round)
8. (Germany) Daniel Masur (first round)

=== Qualifiers ===
1. Aslan Karatsev
2. (Germany) Marko Topo
3. (Switzerland) Alexander Ritschard
4. (Italy) Flavio Cobolli

=== Draw ===
==== First qualifier ====
First round
1	Aslan Karatsev	6	3	6
(Netherlands) Robin Haase	2	6	0
(Germany) Louis Wessels	6	3	6
8	(Germany) Daniel Masur	3	6	3

Qualifying competition
1	Aslan Karatsev	6	6
(Germany) Louis Wessels	2	2

==== Second qualifier ====
First round
2	(Czech Republic) Vít Kopřiva	6^{3}	6	7^{7}
(Spain) Álvaro López San Martín	7^{7}	3	6^{3}
WC	(Germany) Marko Topo	6	6
7	(Japan) Shintaro Mochizuki	3	4

Qualifying competition
2	(Czech Republic) Vít Kopřiva	4	6	3
WC	(Germany) Marko Topo	6	4	6

==== Third qualifier ====
First round
3	(Italy) Riccardo Bonadio	5	6	6
WC	(Germany) Philip Florig	7	3	3
Alexey Vatutin	7	4	5
6	(Switzerland) Alexander Ritschard	5	6	7

Qualifying competition
3	(Italy) Riccardo Bonadio
6	(Switzerland) Alexander Ritschard	w/o

==== Fourth qualifier ====
First round
4	(Czech Republic) Zdeněk Kolář	6	6^{5}	6
(Norway) Viktor Durasovic	4	7^{7}	3
(Czech Republic) Lukáš Rosol	1	2
5	(Italy) Flavio Cobolli	6	6

Qualifying competition
4	(Czech Republic) Zdeněk Kolář	2	2
5	(Italy) Flavio Cobolli	6	6
