= 2024 BMW Open =

ATP tennis tournament

- Date: 15–21 April
- Edition: 108th
- Category: ATP Tour 250
- Draw: 28S/16D
- Prize money: €651,865
- Surface: Clay
- Location: Munich, Germany
- Venue: MTTC Iphitos

Champions

Singles
- (Germany) Jan-Lennard Struff

Doubles
- (India) Yuki Bhambri / (France) Albano Olivetti
← 2023 ·	BMW Open	· 2025 →

The 2024 BMW Open was a men's tennis tournament played on outdoor clay courts. It was the 108th edition of the event and part of the ATP Tour 250 series of the 2024 ATP Tour. It took place at the MTTC Iphitos complex in Munich, Germany, from 15 to 21 April 2024.

== Finals ==
=== Singles ===
- (Germany) Jan-Lennard Struff def. (United States) Taylor Fritz, 7–5, 6–3

=== Doubles ===
- (India) Yuki Bhambri / (France) Albano Olivetti def. (Germany) Andreas Mies / (Germany) Jan-Lennard Struff, 7–6^{(8–6)}, 7–6^{(7–5)}

== Point distribution ==
Event	W	F	SF	QF	R16	R32	Q	Q2	Q1
Singles	250	165	100	50	25	0	13	7	0
Doubles	250	150	90	45	0	—	—	—	—

== Singles main draw entrants ==
=== Seeds ===
Country	Player	Rank	Seed
GER	Alexander Zverev	5	1
DEN	Holger Rune	12	2
USA	Taylor Fritz	13	3
GER	Jan-Lennard Struff	25	4
CAN	Félix Auger-Aliassime	35	5
GBR	Jack Draper	39	6
GER	Dominik Koepfer	54	7
KAZ	Alexander Shevchenko	55	8

- Rankings are as of 8 April 2024.

=== Other entrants ===
The following players received wildcards into the main draw:

- (Germany) Rudolf Molleker
- (Germany) Max Hans Rehberg
- (Germany) Marko Topo

The following players received entry from the qualifying draw:

- Ivan Gakhov
- (Switzerland) Marc-Andrea Hüsler
- (Spain) Alejandro Moro Cañas
- (Italy) Francesco Passaro

=== Withdrawals ===
- (United States) Marcos Giron → replaced by (Czech Republic) Vít Kopřiva
- (Czech Republic) Jakub Menšík → replaced by (Austria) Dominic Thiem
- (United Kingdom) Andy Murray → replaced by (Austria) Jurij Rodionov
- (Croatia) Dino Prižmić → replaced by (Argentina) Camilo Ugo Carabelli

== Doubles main draw entrants ==
=== Seeds ===
Country	Player	Country	Player	Rank	Seed
~~GER~~	~~Kevin Krawietz~~	~~GER~~	~~Tim Pütz~~	~~26~~	~~1~~
USA	Nathaniel Lammons	USA	Jackson Withrow	50	2
BEL	Sander Gillé	BEL	Joran Vliegen	58	3
URU	Ariel Behar	CZE	Adam Pavlásek	81	4

- Rankings are as of 8 April 2024.

=== Other entrants ===
The following pairs received wildcards into the doubles main draw:

- (Germany) Henri Haupt / (Germany) Marko Topo
- (Germany) Andreas Mies / (Germany) Jan-Lennard Struff

The following pair received entry as alternates:

- (Germany) Jakob Schnaitter / (Germany) Mark Wallner

=== Withdrawals ===
- (United States) Marcos Giron / (United States) Evan King → replaced by (United States) Robert Galloway / (United States) Evan King
- (Germany) Kevin Krawietz / (Germany) Tim Pütz → replaced by (Germany) Jakob Schnaitter / (Germany) Mark Wallner
