= 2021 Dutch Open – Doubles =

Doubles
- 2021 Dutch Open

Final
- Champions: (Switzerland) Luca Castelnuovo (France) Manuel Guinard
- Runners-up: (Peru) Sergio Galdós (Portugal) Gonçalo Oliveira
- Score: 0–6, 6–4, [11–9]

Events
Singles	Doubles
- Dutch Open

Harri Heliövaara and Emil Ruusuvuori were the defending champions but chose not to defend their title.

Luca Castelnuovo and Manuel Guinard won the title after defeating Sergio Galdós and Gonçalo Oliveira 0–6, 6–4, [11–9] in the final.

== Seeds ==
1. (Peru) Sergio Galdós / (Portugal) Gonçalo Oliveira (final)
2. (Germany) Dustin Brown / (Austria) Tristan-Samuel Weissborn (semifinals)
3. (Argentina) Guido Andreozzi / (Argentina) Guillermo Durán (first round)
4. (Ecuador) Diego Hidalgo / (Spain) Sergio Martos Gornés (first round)

== Draw ==
Key

- Q = Qualifier
- WC = Wild card
- LL = Lucky loser
- Alt = Alternate
- ITF = ITF entry
- PR = Protected ranking
- SR = Special ranking
- SE = Special exempt
- JE = Junior exempt
- JR = Junior Accelerator Programme entrant
- CO = College Accelerator Programme entrant
- NG = Next Gen Accelerator Program entrant
- w/o = Walkover
- r = Retired
- d = Defaulted

First round
(Belgium) M Geerts (India) A Kadhe	6	6
(Switzerland) J Nikles (Spain) C Sánchez Jover	2	4
4	(Ecuador) D Hidalgo (Spain) S Martos Gornés	3	4
(Netherlands) G Brouwer (Netherlands) J Sels	6	6
WC	(Netherlands) Alexander Maarten Jong (Netherlands) Ryan Nijboer
WC	(Netherlands) Michiel de Krom (Netherlands) B van den Berg	w/o
(Netherlands) J de Jong (Netherlands) B Stevens	4	6^{2}
WC	(Netherlands) D de Jonge (Netherlands) G den Ouden	6	7^{7}
(Switzerland) L Castelnuovo (France) M Guinard	7	6^{11}	[10]
3	(Argentina) G Andreozzi (Argentina) G Durán	5	7^{13}	[5]
(Germany) J Härteis (Germany) Jeremy Jahn	4	4
(Argentina) M Kestelboim (Argentina) F Mena	6	6
(Russia) A Vatutin (Czech Republic) M Vrbenský	4	3
2	(Germany) D Brown (Austria) T-S Weissborn	6	6

Quarterfinals
1	(Peru) S Galdós (Portugal) G Oliveira	6	7
(Belgium) M Geerts (India) A Kadhe	3	5
(Netherlands) G Brouwer (Netherlands) J Sels	6^{5}	5
WC	(Netherlands) M de Krom (Netherlands) B van den Berg	7^{7}	7
WC	(Netherlands) D de Jonge (Netherlands) G den Ouden	3	2
(Switzerland) L Castelnuovo (France) M Guinard	6	6
(Argentina) M Kestelboim (Argentina) F Mena	3	2
2	(Germany) D Brown (Austria) T-S Weissborn	6	6

Semifinals
1	(Peru) S Galdós (Portugal) G Oliveira	6	6
WC	(Netherlands) M de Krom (Netherlands) B van den Berg	2	2
(Switzerland) L Castelnuovo (France) M Guinard	6	6
2	(Germany) D Brown (Austria) T-S Weissborn	4	3

Final
1	(Peru) S Galdós (Portugal) G Oliveira	6	4	[9]
(Switzerland) L Castelnuovo (France) M Guinard	0	6	[11]
