= 2025 Winston-Salem Open =

- Date: August 17–23
- Edition: 56th
- Category: ATP Tour 250 Series
- Draw: 48S / 16D
- Surface: Hard / outdoor
- Location: Winston-Salem, North Carolina, United States
- Venue: Wake Forest University

Champions

Singles
- (Hungary) Márton Fucsovics

Doubles
- (Brazil) Rafael Matos / (Brazil) Marcelo Melo
| ← 2024 · | Winston-Salem Open | · 2026 → |

The 2025 Winston-Salem Open was a men's tennis tournament played on outdoor hard courts. It was the 56th edition of the Winston-Salem Open (as successor to previous tournaments in New Haven and Long Island), and an ATP 250 tournament on the 2025 ATP Tour. It took place at Wake Forest University in Winston-Salem, North Carolina, United States, from August 17 to August 23, 2025.

== Champions ==
=== Singles ===
- (Hungary) Márton Fucsovics def. (Netherlands) Botic van de Zandschulp, 6–3, 7–6^{(7–3)}

=== Doubles ===
- (Brazil) Rafael Matos / (Brazil) Marcelo Melo def. (Portugal) Francisco Cabral / (Austria) Lucas Miedler, 4–6, 6–4, [10–8]

== Singles main draw entrants ==
=== Seeds ===
| Country | Player | Rank^{†} | Seed |
|---|---|---|---|
| GRE | Stefanos Tsitsipas | 29 | 1 |
| NED | Tallon Griekspoor | 32 | 2 |
| ITA | Luciano Darderi | 34 | 3 |
| CAN | Gabriel Diallo | 35 | 4 |
| ITA | Lorenzo Sonego | 36 | 5 |
| ITA | Matteo Arnaldi | 37 | 6 |
| POR | Nuno Borges | 38 | 7 |
| FRA | Alexandre Müller | 41 | 8 |
| FRA | Giovanni Mpetshi Perricard | 42 | 9 |
| ARG | Sebastián Báez | 43 | 10 |
| USA | Sebastian Korda | 45 | 11 |
| ESP | Jaume Munar | 48 | 12 |
| SRB | Miomir Kecmanović | 49 | 13 |
| ESP | Roberto Bautista Agut | 53 | 14 |
| GBR | Jacob Fearnley | 57 | 15 |
| USA | Marcos Giron | 61 | 16 |

^{†} Rankings are as of August 4, 2025.

=== Other entrants ===
The following players received wildcards into the singles main draw:

- (United States) Stefan Dostanic
- (United States) Marcos Giron
- (Netherlands) Tallon Griekspoor
- (United States) Brandon Holt

The following player received entry using a protected ranking:

- (Austria) Sebastian Ofner

The following player received entry as an emergency substitution:

- (Greece) Stefanos Tsitsipas

The following player received entry as a late entry:

- (Italy) Matteo Arnaldi

The following players received entry from the qualifying draw:

- (United States) Nishesh Basavareddy
- (United States) Darwin Blanch
- (India) Dhakshineswar Suresh
- (Australia) Aleksandar Vukic

=== Withdrawals ===
- (Germany) Daniel Altmaier → replaced by (Austria) Filip Misolic
- (France) Benjamin Bonzi → replaced by (United States) Mackenzie McDonald
- (Serbia) Laslo Djere → replaced by (Croatia) Borna Ćorić
- (Argentina) Tomás Martín Etcheverry → replaced by (Japan) Yoshihito Nishioka
- (France) Arthur Fils → replaced by (Netherlands) Botic van de Zandschulp
- (Hungary) Fábián Marozsán → replaced by (Spain) Pablo Carreño Busta
- (United States) Alex Michelsen → replaced by (Greece) Stefanos Tsitsipas
- (France) Corentin Moutet → replaced by (Australia) Adam Walton
- (United States) Learner Tien → replaced by (Belgium) Raphaël Collignon

== Doubles main draw entrants ==
=== Seeds ===
| Country | Player | Country | Player | Rank^{†} | Seed |
|---|---|---|---|---|---|
| GBR | Joe Salisbury | GBR | Neal Skupski | 23 | 2 |
| IND | Yuki Bhambri | NZL | Michael Venus | 57 | 2 |
| POR | Francisco Cabral | AUT | Lucas Miedler | 67 | 3 |
| AUS | Matthew Ebden | AUS | John Peers | 74 | 4 |

^{†} Rankings are as of August 4, 2025.

=== Other entrants ===
The following pairs received wildcard entry into the doubles main draw :

- (United States) Vasil Kirkov / (United States) Sebastian Korda
- (United Kingdom) Luca Pow / (India) Dhakshineswar Suresh

=== Withdrawals ===
- (Croatia) Ivan Dodig / (United Kingdom) Jamie Murray → replaced by (Brazil) Rafael Matos / (Brazil) Marcelo Melo
- (Spain) Marcel Granollers / (Argentina) Horacio Zeballos → replaced by (Brazil) Fernando Romboli / (Australia) John-Patrick Smith
- (Czech Republic) Adam Pavlásek / (Poland) Jan Zieliński → replaced by (United States) Jackson Withrow / (Poland) Jan Zieliński
