= 2021 Dutch Open – Singles =

Singles
- 2021 Dutch Open

Final
- Champion: (Netherlands) Tallon Griekspoor
- Runner-up: (Netherlands) Botic van de Zandschulp
- Score: 6–1, 3–6, 6–1

Events
Singles	Doubles
- Dutch Open

Mats Moraing was the defending champion but lost in the second round to Botic van de Zandschulp.

Tallon Griekspoor won the title after defeating van de Zandschulp 6–1, 3–6, 6–1 in the final.

== Seeds ==
1. (Netherlands) Tallon Griekspoor (champion)
2. (Netherlands) Botic van de Zandschulp (final)
3. (Australia) Marc Polmans (first round)
4. (France) Antoine Hoang (semifinals)
5. (Egypt) Mohamed Safwat (second round)
6. (Belgium) Kimmer Coppejans (quarterfinals)
7. (Argentina) Guido Andreozzi (semifinals)
8. (Czech Republic) Lukáš Rosol (quarterfinals)

== Draw ==
Key

- Q = Qualifier
- WC = Wild card
- LL = Lucky loser
- Alt = Alternate
- ITF = ITF entry
- PR = Protected ranking
- SR = Special ranking
- SE = Special exempt
- JE = Junior exempt
- JR = Junior Accelerator Programme entrant
- CO = College Accelerator Programme entrant
- NG = Next Gen Accelerator Program entrant
- w/o = Walkover
- r = Retired
- d = Defaulted

=== Finals ===
Semifinals
1	(Netherlands) Tallon Griekspoor	4	6	6
4	(France) Antoine Hoang	6	3	4
7	(Argentina) Guido Andreozzi	7^{7}	3	2
2	(Netherlands) Botic van de Zandschulp	6^{4}	6	6

Final
1	(Netherlands) Tallon Griekspoor	6	3	6
2	(Netherlands) Botic van de Zandschulp	1	6	1

=== Top half ===
First round
1	(Netherlands) T Griekspoor	6	7^{7}
Q	(Belgium) M Geerts	2	6^{2}
(Belgium) Z Bergs	4	6^{2}
(Czech Republic) M Vrbenský	6	7^{7}
WC	(Netherlands) G Brouwer	7^{9}	0
Q	(Netherlands) Alexander Maarten Jong	6^{7}	0^{r}
Q	(Netherlands) Deney Wassermann	3	7	2
6	(Belgium) K Coppejans	6	5	6
4	(France) A Hoang	6	7^{7}
(Germany) Y Maden	4	6^{5}
Alt	(Brazil) T Bellucci	3	4
(Argentina) F Mena	6	6
WC	(Netherlands) Ryan Nijboer	6^{5}	2
Q	(Switzerland) J Nikles	7^{7}	6
(Czech Republic) V Kopřiva	6^{4}	2
8	(Czech Republic) L Rosol	7^{7}	6

Second round
1	(Netherlands) T Griekspoor	6	6
(Czech Republic) M Vrbenský	4	4
WC	(Netherlands) G Brouwer	3	4
6	(Belgium) K Coppejans	6	6
4	(France) A Hoang	7^{7}	7^{7}
(Argentina) F Mena	6^{4}	6^{5}
Q	(Switzerland) J Nikles	2	1
8	(Czech Republic) L Rosol	6	6

Quarterfinals
1	(Netherlands) T Griekspoor	3	6	6
6	(Belgium) K Coppejans	6	3	2
4	(France) A Hoang	6	7^{7}
8	(Czech Republic) L Rosol	4	6^{4}

Semifinals
1	(Netherlands) T Griekspoor	4	6	6
4	(France) A Hoang	6	3	4

=== Bottom half ===
First round
7	(Argentina) G Andreozzi	7	2	6
(Czech Republic) J Lehečka	5	6	4
(Netherlands) R Haase	4	6^{1}
(Australia) A Vukic	6	7^{7}
(United States) JC Aragone	1	1
WC	(Netherlands) J Sels	6	6
(Russia) A Vatutin	6^{4}	6	6
3	(Australia) M Polmans	7^{7}	4	4
5	(Egypt) M Safwat	6	6
(Portugal) G Elias	1	3
(France) M Guinard	6^{5}	6	6^{5}
(Netherlands) J de Jong	7^{7}	4	7^{7}
(Germany) M Moraing	6	6
Alt	(Germany) J Härteis	1	0
(Portugal) G Oliveira	2	4
2	(Netherlands) B van de Zandschulp	6	6

Second round
7	(Argentina) G Andreozzi	7	2	6
(Australia) A Vukic	5	6	3
WC	(Netherlands) J Sels	6	6
(Russia) A Vatutin	2	2
5	(Egypt) M Safwat	6	1	4
(Netherlands) J de Jong	2	6	6
(Germany) M Moraing	3	5
2	(Netherlands) B van de Zandschulp	6	7

Quarterfinals
7	(Argentina) G Andreozzi	3	6	6
WC	(Netherlands) J Sels	6	4	2
(Netherlands) J de Jong	3	0
2	(Netherlands) B van de Zandschulp	6	6

Semifinals
7	(Argentina) G Andreozzi	7^{7}	3	2
2	(Netherlands) B van de Zandschulp	6^{4}	6	6
