= 2025 BMW Open =

ATP tennis tournament

- Date: 14–20 April
- Edition: 109th
- Category: ATP 500
- Draw: 32S / 16D
- Prize money: €2,500,000
- Surface: Clay
- Location: Munich, Germany
- Venue: MTTC Iphitos

Champions

Singles
- (Germany) Alexander Zverev

Doubles
- (Sweden) André Göransson / (Netherlands) Sem Verbeek
- BMW Open

The 2025 BMW Open by Bitpanda was an ATP 500-level tennis event played on outdoor clay courts. It was the 109th edition of the event on the 2025 ATP Tour (upgraded from ATP 250 status in previous years). It took place at the MTTC Iphitos complex in Munich, Germany, from 14 to 20 April 2025.

== Champions ==
=== Singles ===
- (Germany) Alexander Zverev def. (United States) Ben Shelton, 6–2, 6–4

=== Doubles ===
- (Sweden) André Göransson / (Netherlands) Sem Verbeek def. (Germany) Kevin Krawietz / (Germany) Tim Pütz 6–4, 6–4

== Point distribution ==
Event	W	F	SF	QF	R16	R32	Q	Q2	Q1
Singles	500	330	200	100	50	0	25	13	0
Doubles	500	300	180	90	0	—N/a	45	25	0

== Singles main draw entrants ==
=== Seeds ===
Country	Player	Rank	Seed
GER	Alexander Zverev	2	1
USA	Ben Shelton	14	2
CAN	Félix Auger-Aliassime	19	3
FRA	Ugo Humbert	20	4
ARG	Francisco Cerúndolo	22	5
CZE	Jakub Menšík	23	6
~~CZE~~	~~Jiří Lehečka~~	~~28~~	~~7~~
CAN	Denis Shapovalov	29	8

- Rankings are as of 7 April 2025.

=== Other entrants ===
The following players received wildcards into the main draw:

- (Germany) Daniel Altmaier
- (Germany) Justin Engel
- (Germany) Yannick Hanfmann

The following players received entry from the qualifying draw:

- (Kazakhstan) Alexander Bublik
- (Croatia) Borna Gojo
- (United States) Learner Tien
- (Chinese Taipei) Tseng Chun-hsin

The following players received entry as lucky losers:

- (Germany) Diego Dedura-Palomero
- (United Kingdom) Billy Harris
- (Australia) Christopher O'Connell
- (Kazakhstan) Alexander Shevchenko
- (Netherlands) Botic van de Zandschulp

=== Withdrawals ===
- (Italy) Matteo Berrettini → replaced by (Argentina) Mariano Navone
- (Portugal) Nuno Borges → replaced by (United Kingdom) Billy Harris
- (United States) Taylor Fritz → replaced by (Czech Republic) Jakub Menšík
- (France) Quentin Halys → replaced by (Kazakhstan) Alexander Shevchenko
- (Poland) Hubert Hurkacz → replaced by (Belgium) David Goffin
- (Czech Republic) Jiří Lehečka → replaced by (Australia) Christopher O'Connell
- (France) Gaël Monfils → replaced by (Germany) Diego Dedura-Palomero
- (Chile) Alejandro Tabilo → replaced by (Netherlands) Botic van de Zandschulp
- (China) Zhang Zhizhen → replaced by (Hungary) Fábián Marozsán

== Doubles main draw entrants ==
=== Seeds ===
Country	Player	Country	Player	Rank	Seed
GER	Kevin Krawietz	GER	Tim Pütz	17	1
ESP	Marcel Granollers	ARG	Horacio Zeballos	21	2
USA	Christian Harrison	USA	Evan King	51	3
GBR	Jamie Murray	USA	Rajeev Ram	52	4

- Rankings are as of 7 April 2025.

=== Other entrants ===
The following pairs received wildcards into the doubles main draw:

- (Germany) Andreas Mies / (Germany) Jan-Lennard Struff
- (Germany) Jakob Schnaitter / (Germany) Mark Wallner

The following pair received entry from the qualifying draw:

- (Germany) Justin Engel / (Germany) Max Hans Rehberg

The following pair received entry as alternates:

- (Argentina) Guido Andreozzi / (France) Théo Arribagé

=== Withdrawals ===
- (Australia) Matthew Ebden / (Australia) John Peers → replaced by (Argentina) Guido Andreozzi / (France) Théo Arribagé
