= 2021 Dutch Open =

- Date: 12 – 18 July
- Surface: Clay / outdoor
- Location: Amersfoort, Netherlands

Champions

Singles
- (Netherlands) Tallon Griekspoor

Doubles
- (Switzerland) Luca Castelnuovo / (France) Manuel Guinard
- Dutch Open (tennis)

The 2021 Dutch Open, also known by its sponsored name Van Mossel Kia Dutch Open, was a professional tennis tournament played on clay courts. It was the second edition of the Challenger tournament which was part of the 2021 ATP Challenger Tour. It took place in Amersfoort, Netherlands between 12 and 18 July 2021.

== Singles main draw entrants ==
=== Seeds ===
Country	Player	Rank^{1}	Seed
NED	Tallon Griekspoor	124	1
NED	Botic van de Zandschulp	139	2
AUS	Marc Polmans	154	3
FRA	Antoine Hoang	156	4
EGY	Mohamed Safwat	170	5
BEL	Kimmer Coppejans	191	6
ARG	Guido Andreozzi	203	7
CZE	Lukáš Rosol	204	8

- ^{1} Rankings are as of 28 June 2021.

=== Other entrants ===
The following players received wildcards into the singles main draw:

- (Netherlands) Gijs Brouwer
- (Netherlands) Ryan Nijboer
- (Netherlands) Jelle Sels

The following players received entry into the singles main draw as alternates:

- (Brazil) Thomaz Bellucci
- (Germany) Johannes Härteis

The following players received entry from the qualifying draw:

- (Belgium) Michael Geerts
- (Netherlands) Alexander Maarten Jong
- (Switzerland) Johan Nikles
- (Netherlands) Deney Wassermann

== Champions ==
=== Singles ===
- (Netherlands) Tallon Griekspoor def. (Netherlands) Botic van de Zandschulp 6–1, 3–6, 6–1.

=== Doubles ===
- (Switzerland) Luca Castelnuovo / (France) Manuel Guinard def. (Peru) Sergio Galdós / (Portugal) Gonçalo Oliveira 0–6, 6–4, [11–9].
