= 2023 BMW Open =

ATP tennis tournament

- Date: 17 – 23 April
- Edition: 107th
- Category: ATP Tour 250
- Draw: 28S/16D
- Prize money: €562,815
- Surface: Clay
- Location: Munich, Germany
- Venue: MTTC Iphitos

Champions

Singles
- (Denmark) Holger Rune

Doubles
- (Austria) Alexander Erler / (Austria) Lucas Miedler
← 2022 ·	BMW Open	· 2024 →

The 2023 BMW Open (also known as the BMW Open by American Express for sponsorship reasons) was a men's tennis tournament currently played on outdoor clay courts. It was the 107th edition of the event and part of the ATP Tour 250 series of the 2023 ATP Tour. It took place at the MTTC Iphitos complex in Munich, Germany, from 17 to 23 April 2023.

== Finals ==
=== Singles ===
- (Denmark) Holger Rune def. (Netherlands) Botic van de Zandschulp 6–4, 1–6, 7–6^{(7–3)}

=== Doubles ===
- (Austria) Alexander Erler / (Austria) Lucas Miedler def. (Germany) Kevin Krawietz / (Germany) Tim Pütz, 6–3, 6–4

== Point distribution ==
Event	W	F	SF	QF	Round of 16	Round of 32	Q	Q2	Q1
Singles	250	150	90	45	20	0	12	6	0
Doubles	250	150	90	45	0	—	—	—	—

== Singles main draw entrants ==
=== Seeds ===
Country	Player	Rank	Seed
DEN	Holger Rune	7	1
USA	Taylor Fritz	10	2
GER	Alexander Zverev	16	3
NED	Botic van de Zandschulp	31	4
ARG	Sebastián Báez	32	5
ITA	Lorenzo Sonego	45	6
ESP	Roberto Carballés Baena	49	7
SUI	Marc-Andrea Hüsler	60	8

- Rankings are as of 10 April 2023.

=== Other entrants ===
The following players received wildcards into the main draw:

- (Germany) Daniel Altmaier
- (Germany) Yannick Hanfmann
- (Germany) Max Hans Rehberg

The following player received entry using a protected ranking into the main draw:

- (United Kingdom) Kyle Edmund

The following players received entry from the qualifying draw:

- (Italy) Flavio Cobolli
- Aslan Karatsev
- (Switzerland) Alexander Ritschard
- (Germany) Marko Topo

=== Withdrawals ===
- (Italy) Matteo Berrettini → replaced by (Germany) Jan-Lennard Struff
- (United States) Maxime Cressy → replaced by (Spain) Roberto Carballés Baena
- (United Kingdom) Jack Draper → replaced by (Australia) Christopher O'Connell

== Doubles main draw entrants ==
=== Seeds ===
Country	Player	Country	Player	Rank	Seed
GER	Kevin Krawietz	GER	Tim Pütz	44	1
COL	Juan Sebastián Cabal	COL	Robert Farah	50	2
USA	Nathaniel Lammons	USA	Jackson Withrow	66	3
BRA	Marcelo Melo	AUS	John Peers	79	4

- Rankings are as of 10 April 2023.

=== Other entrants ===
The following pairs received wildcards into the doubles main draw:

- (Germany) Matthias Bachinger / (Austria) Dominic Thiem
- (Germany) Oscar Otte / (Germany) Jan-Lennard Struff

The following pairs received entry as alternates:

- (Germany) Yannick Hanfmann / (Germany) Daniel Masur
- (Australia) Christopher O'Connell / (France) Albano Olivetti

=== Withdrawals ===
- (Spain) Roberto Carballés Baena / (Brazil) Thiago Monteiro → replaced by (Australia) Christopher O'Connell / (France) Albano Olivetti
- (France) Jérémy Chardy / (France) Fabrice Martin → replaced by (France) Jérémy Chardy / (France) Ugo Humbert
- (United States) Maxime Cressy / (France) Albano Olivetti → replaced by (Jamaica) Dustin Brown / (Czech Republic) Adam Pavlásek
- (United States) Marcos Giron / (France) Constant Lestienne → replaced by (Germany) Yannick Hanfmann / (Germany) Daniel Masur
