= Henri Haupt =

German tennis player

- Country (sports): Germany
- Born: 26 May 2006 (age 20) Munich, Germany
- Height: 1.93 m (6 ft 4 in)
- Plays: Right-handed (two-handed backhand)
- Coach: Christos Fiotakis
- Prize money: US $10,229

Singles
- Career record: 0–0 (at ATP Tour level, Grand Slam level, and in Davis Cup)
- Career titles: 0
- Highest ranking: No. 2,047 (23 February 2026)

Doubles
- Career record: 0–1 (at ATP Tour level, Grand Slam level, and in Davis Cup)
- Career titles: 0
- Highest ranking: No. 1,852 (19 October 2026)
- Current ranking: No. 1,864 (16 November 2026)
- Last updated on: 22 November 2026.

Henri Haupt (born 26 May 2006) is a German tennis player. He has a career-high ATP singles ranking of No. 2,047 achieved on 23 February 2026 and a doubles ranking of No. 1,852 achieved on 19 October 2026.

== Personal life ==
Henri is the son of Hubert Haupt, a DTM racing driver, entrepreneur, and investor. Henri Haupt has been training at the Munich tennis club MTTC Iphitos under tennis coach Ulf Fischer since he was seven years old and is simultaneously completing his Abitur in Mannheim.

== Career ==
=== Junior career ===
Haupt trained as a junior in Munich. He won his first ITF junior doubles title in February 2023 in Durban, South Africa alongside Max Geissinger. The following month, he won his first junior singles title in Gjøvik, without dropping a set in the tournament.

=== Pro career ===
In April 2024, he was given a wildcard into the main draw of the men's doubles at the 2024 BMW Open alongside Marko Topo, losing in straight sets to Ariel Behar and Adam Pavlasek.
