= 2019 Tennis Challenger Hamburg =

- Date: 21–27 October
- Edition: 1st
- Surface: Hard (indoor)
- Location: Hamburg, Germany

Champions

Singles
- (Netherlands) Botic van de Zandschulp

Doubles
- (United States) James Cerretani / (United States) Maxime Cressy
- Tennis Challenger Hamburg

The 2019 Tennis Challenger Hamburg presented by Tannenhof was a professional tennis tournament played on indoor hard courts. It was the first edition of the tournament which was part of the 2019 ATP Challenger Tour. It took place in Hamburg, Germany between 21 and 27 October 2019.

== Singles main-draw entrants ==
=== Seeds ===
Country	Player	Rank^{1}	Seed
ITA	Salvatore Caruso	95	1
SWE	Elias Ymer	123	2
ITA	Gianluca Mager	124	3
UKR	Sergiy Stakhovsky	142	4
ITA	Alessandro Giannessi	147	5
ITA	Federico Gaio	150	6
NED	Robin Haase	151	7
GER	Oscar Otte	155	8
SRB	Viktor Troicki	160	9
ITA	Filippo Baldi	163	10
SRB	Nikola Milojević	164	11
GER	Rudolf Molleker	167	12
ESP	Pedro Martínez	168	13
NED	Tallon Griekspoor	169	14
SVK	Filip Horanský	173	15
~~ESP~~	~~Nicola Kuhn~~	~~175~~	~~16~~

- ^{1} Rankings are as of 14 October 2019.

=== Other entrants ===
The following players received wildcards into the singles main draw:

- (Germany) Daniel Altmaier
- (Germany) Niklas Guttau
- (Germany) Johannes Härteis
- (Germany) Milan Welte
- (Germany) Louis Wessels

The following player received entry into the singles main draw using a protected ranking:

- (Austria) Maximilian Neuchrist

The following player received entry into the singles main draw as an alternate:

- (Turkey) Altuğ Çelikbilek

The following players received entry from the qualifying draw:

- (Netherlands) Jelle Sels
- (Ukraine) Vadym Ursu

The following players received entry as lucky losers:

- (Germany) Osman Torski
- (Poland) Kacper Żuk

== Champions ==
=== Singles ===
- (Netherlands) Botic van de Zandschulp def. (Spain) Bernabé Zapata Miralles 6–3, 5–7, 6–1.

=== Doubles ===
- (United States) James Cerretani / (United States) Maxime Cressy def. (United Kingdom) Ken Skupski / (Australia) John-Patrick Smith 6–4, 6–4.
