= 2025 Winston-Salem Open – Singles =

Singles
- 2025 Winston-Salem Open

Final
- Champion: (Hungary) Márton Fucsovics
- Runner-up: (Netherlands) Botic van de Zandschulp
- Score: 6–3, 7–6^{(7–3)}

Details
- Draw: 48 (4 Q / 4 WC )
- Seeds: 16

Events
Singles	Doubles
- Winston-Salem Open

Márton Fucsovics defeated Botic van de Zandschulp in the final, 6–3, 7–6^{(7–3)} to win the singles tennis title at the 2025 Winston-Salem Open. It was his third career ATP Tour title.

Lorenzo Sonego was the defending champion, but lost in the third round to Jaume Munar.

== Seeds ==
All seeds received a bye into the second round.

1. (Greece) Stefanos Tsitsipas (second round)
2. (Netherlands) Tallon Griekspoor (second round)
3. (Italy) Luciano Darderi (third round)
4. (Canada) Gabriel Diallo (third round)
5. (Italy) Lorenzo Sonego (third round)
6. (Italy) Matteo Arnaldi (second round)
7. (Portugal) Nuno Borges (second round)
8. (France) Alexandre Müller (third round)
9. (France) Giovanni Mpetshi Perricard (semifinals)
10. (Argentina) Sebastián Báez (third round)
11. (United States) Sebastian Korda (semifinals, withdrew)
12. (Spain) Jaume Munar (quarterfinals)
13. (Serbia) Miomir Kecmanović (quarterfinals)
14. (Spain) Roberto Bautista Agut (third round)
15. (United Kingdom) Jacob Fearnley (second round)
16. (United States) Marcos Giron (second round)

Click on the seed number of a player to go to their draw section.

== Draw ==
Key

- Q = Qualifier
- WC = Wild card
- LL = Lucky loser
- Alt = Alternate
- ITF = ITF entry
- PR = Protected ranking
- SR = Special ranking
- SE = Special exempt
- JE = Junior exempt
- JR = Junior Accelerator Programme entrant
- CO = College Accelerator Programme entrant
- NG = Next Gen Accelerator Program entrant
- w/o = Walkover
- r = Retired
- d = Defaulted

=== Finals ===
Quarterfinals
(China) Bu Yunchaokete	3	7	3
(Netherlands) Botic van de Zandschulp	6	5	6
(Serbia) Hamad Medjedovic	6^{8}	2
9	(France) Giovanni Mpetshi Perricard	7^{10}	6
11	(United States) Sebastian Korda	6	6
13	(Serbia) Miomir Kecmanović	1	4
12	(Spain) Jaume Munar	5	3
(Hungary) Márton Fucsovics	7	6

Semifinals
(Netherlands) Botic van de Zandschulp	6	7
9	(France) Giovanni Mpetshi Perricard	4	5
11	(United States) Sebastian Korda
(Hungary) Márton Fucsovics	w/o

Final
(Netherlands) Botic van de Zandschulp	3	6^{3}
(Hungary) Márton Fucsovics	6	7^{7}

=== Top half ===
==== Section 1 ====
First round
(China) Y Bu	6^{2}	6	7^{7}
(Chinese Taipei) C-h Tseng	7^{7}	3	6^{4}
(Argentina) M Navone	6	6
Q	(India) D Suresh	3	3
(Japan) Y Nishioka	0	3
(Spain) P Carreño Busta	6	6
(Netherlands) B van de Zandschulp	2	7	6
(Australia) A Walton	6	5	3

Second round
1	(Greece) S Tsitsipas	3	2
(China) Y Bu	6	6
(Argentina) M Navone	6	6
16/WC	(United States) M Giron	2	2
10	(Argentina) S Báez	7	6
(Spain) P Carreño Busta	5	2
(Netherlands) B van de Zandschulp	6	6
6	(Italy) M Arnaldi	3	3

Third round
(China) Y Bu	6	6
(Argentina) M Navone	4	4
10	(Argentina) S Báez	6	1	4
(Netherlands) B van de Zandschulp	0	6	6

Quarterfinals
(China) Y Bu	3	7	3
(Netherlands) B van de Zandschulp	6	5	6

==== Section 2 ====
First round
(Belgium) R Collignon	2	6^{2}
Q	(United States) N Basavareddy	6	7^{7}
(Serbia) H Medjedovic	6	7^{11}
(France) A Rinderknech	3	6^{9}
(Belgium) D Goffin	3	3
(Spain) P Martínez	6	6
(Croatia) B Ćorić	4	6^{5}
Q	(United States) Dar Blanch	6	7^{7}

Second round
4	(Canada) G Diallo	w/o
Q	(United States) N Basavareddy
(Serbia) H Medjedovic	6	7^{7}
15	(United Kingdom) J Fearnley	4	6^{2}
9	(France) G Mpetshi Perricard	2	6	7^{7}
(Spain) P Martínez	6	3	6^{3}
Q	(United States) Dar Blanch	7^{7}	3	5
8	(France) A Müller	6^{3}	6	7

Third round
4	(Canada) G Diallo	4	2
(Serbia) H Medjedovic	6	6
9	(France) G Mpetshi Perricard	6	6
8	(France) A Müller	3	2

Quarterfinals
(Serbia) H Medjedovic	6^{8}	2
9	(France) G Mpetshi Perricard	7^{10}	6

=== Bottom half ===
==== Section 3 ====
First round
(Poland) K Majchrzak	7^{8}	6
(Chile) N Jarry	6^{6}	4
PR	(Austria) S Ofner	6	4	3
(Czech Republic) V Kopřiva	3	6	6
(United States) A Kovacevic	7^{7}	7^{10}
(Austria) F Misolic	6^{2}	6^{8}
(United States) M McDonald	6	6^{2}	7^{7}
WC	(United States) B Holt	4	7^{7}	6^{2}

Second round
7	(Portugal) N Borges	1	3
(Poland) K Majchrzak	6	6
(Czech Republic) V Kopřiva	3	4
11	(United States) S Korda	6	6
13	(Serbia) M Kecmanović	6	7^{7}
(United States) A Kovacevic	4	6^{5}
(United States) M McDonald	6^{5}	7^{8}	4
3	(Italy) L Darderi	7^{7}	6^{6}	6

Third round
(Poland) K Majchrzak	7^{7}	3	4
11	(United States) S Korda	6^{3}	6	6
13	(Serbia) M Kecmanović	6	6
3	(Italy) L Darderi	3	1

Quarterfinals
11	(United States) S Korda	6	6
13	(Serbia) M Kecmanović	1	4

==== Section 4 ====
First round
WC	(United States) S Dostanic	6	6
Q	(Australia) A Vukic	4	2
(Argentina) F Comesaña	4	3
(Italy) M Bellucci	6	6
R Safiullin	3	3
(Australia) C O'Connell	6	6
(France) H Gaston	3	3
(Hungary) M Fucsovics	6	6

Second round
5	(Italy) L Sonego	6	6^{2}	7^{7}
WC	(United States) S Dostanic	3	7^{7}	6^{3}
(Italy) M Bellucci	3	1
12	(Spain) J Munar	6	6
14	(Spain) R Bautista Agut	6	0
(Australia) C O'Connell	4	0^{r}
(Hungary) M Fucsovics	6	4	6
2/WC	(Netherlands) T Griekspoor	3	6	3

Third round
5	(Italy) L Sonego	6	4	1
12	(Spain) J Munar	4	6	6
14	(Spain) R Bautista Agut	4	3
(Hungary) M Fucsovics	6	6

Quarterfinals
12	(Spain) J Munar	5	3
(Hungary) M Fucsovics	7	6

== Qualifying ==
=== Seeds ===
1. (Australia) Aleksandar Vukic (qualified)
2. (Australia) Tristan Schoolkate (qualifying competition)
3. (Chile) Alejandro Tabilo (qualifying competition)
4. (France) Valentin Royer (qualifying competition)
5. (United States) Emilio Nava (withdrew)
6. (United States) Nishesh Basavareddy (qualified)
7. (United States) Tristan Boyer (first round)
8. (United States) Aidan Mayo (first round)

=== Qualifiers ===
1. (Australia) Aleksandar Vukic
2. (United States) Nishesh Basavareddy
3. (India) Dhakshineswar Suresh
4. (United States) Darwin Blanch

=== Qualifying draw ===
==== First qualifier ====
First round
1	(Australia) Aleksandar Vukic	6	6
WC	(United Kingdom) Luca Pow	3	4
Alt	(United States) Thai-Son Kwiatkowski	6	5	3
Alt	(United States) Karl Poling	3	7	6

Qualifying competition
1	(Australia) Aleksandar Vukic	6	6
Alt	(United States) Karl Poling	4	2

==== Second qualifier ====
First round
2	(Australia) Tristan Schoolkate	6^{5}	6	6
Alt	(United States) Cannon Kingsley	7^{7}	4	1
Alt	(United States) Alex Rybakov	2	0
6	(United States) Nishesh Basavareddy	6	6

Qualifying competition
2	(Australia) Tristan Schoolkate	4	3
6	(United States) Nishesh Basavareddy	6	6

==== Third qualifier ====
First round
3	(Chile) Alejandro Tabilo	6	7
Alt	(United States) Kyle Seelig	3	5
WC	(India) Dhakshineswar Suresh	6	6
8	(United States) Aidan Mayo	3	4

Qualifying competition
3	(Chile) Alejandro Tabilo	6	6^{4}	3
WC	(India) Dhakshineswar Suresh	1	7^{7}	6

==== Fourth qualifier ====
First round
4	(France) Valentin Royer	6	6
Alt	(Japan) Kenta Miyoshi	2	4
Alt	(United States) Darwin Blanch	6	6
7	(United States) Tristan Boyer	2	3

Qualifying competition
4	(France) Valentin Royer	6	2	6^{5}
Alt	(United States) Darwin Blanch	4	6	7^{7}
