= 2025 Winston-Salem Open – Doubles =

Doubles
- 2025 Winston-Salem Open

Final
- Champions: (Brazil) Rafael Matos (Brazil) Marcelo Melo
- Runners-up: (Portugal) Francisco Cabral (Austria) Lucas Miedler
- Score: 4–6, 6–4, [10–8]

Events
| Singles | Doubles |
- Winston-Salem Open

Rafael Matos and Marcelo Melo defeated Francisco Cabral and Lucas Miedler in the final, 4–6, 6–4, [10–8] to win the doubles tennis title at the 2025 Winston-Salem Open.

Nathaniel Lammons and Jackson Withrow were the two-time reigning champions, but chose not to compete together this year. Lammons partnered Sadio Doumbia, but lost in the first round to Withrow and Jan Zieliński. Withrow and Zieliński lost in the second round to Cabral and Miedler.

== Seeds ==
1. (United Kingdom) Joe Salisbury / (United Kingdom) Neal Skupski (semifinals, withdrew)
2. (India) Yuki Bhambri / (New Zealand) Michael Venus (semifinals)
3. (Portugal) Francisco Cabral / (Austria) Lucas Miedler (final)
4. (Australia) Matthew Ebden / (Australia) John Peers (quarterfinals)

== Draw ==
Key

- Q = Qualifier
- WC = Wild card
- LL = Lucky loser
- Alt = Alternate
- ITF = ITF entry
- PR = Protected ranking
- SR = Special ranking
- SE = Special exempt
- JE = Junior exempt
- JR = Junior Accelerator Programme entrant
- CO = College Accelerator Programme entrant
- NG = Next Gen Accelerator Program entrant
- w/o = Walkover
- r = Retired
- d = Defaulted

=== Draw ===
First round
1 | (United Kingdom) J Salisbury (United Kingdom) N Skupski | 3 | 6 | [10]
WC | (United Kingdom) L Pow (India) D Suresh | 6 | 3 | [8]
WC | (United States) V Kirkov (United States) S Korda | 2 | 5
(Brazil) F Romboli (Australia) J-P Smith | 6 | 7
3 | (Portugal) F Cabral (Austria) L Miedler | 4 | 7^{7} | [10]
(Sweden) A Göransson (Netherlands) S Verbeek | 6 | 6^{3} | [8]
(France) S Doumbia (United States) N Lammons | 6 | 6^{6} | [9]
(United States) J Withrow (Poland) J Zieliński | 3 | 7^{8} | [11]
(Brazil) R Matos (Brazil) M Melo | 6 | 6
(Austria) A Erler (United States) R Galloway | 2 | 2
(France) M Guinard (Netherlands) D Pel | 6 | 3 | [13]
4 | (Australia) M Ebden (Australia) J Peers | 2 | 6 | [15]
(Monaco) R Arneodo (India) R Bopanna | 6 | 6
(Italy) L Darderi (France) A Müller | 1 | 1
(Mexico) S González (United States) A Krajicek | 6 | 3 | [4]
2 | (India) Y Bhambri (New Zealand) M Venus | 2 | 6 | [10]

Quarterfinals
1 | (United Kingdom) J Salisbury (United Kingdom) N Skupski | 6 | 6
(Brazil) F Romboli (Australia) J-P Smith | 3 | 4
3 | (Portugal) F Cabral (Austria) L Miedler | 6 | 6
(United States) J Withrow (Poland) J Zieliński | 3 | 2
(Brazil) R Matos (Brazil) M Melo | 6 | 6
4 | (Australia) M Ebden (Australia) J Peers | 4 | 3
(Monaco) R Arneodo (India) R Bopanna | 6^{2} | 3
2 | (India) Y Bhambri (New Zealand) M Venus | 7^{7} | 6

Semifinals
1 | (United Kingdom) J Salisbury (United Kingdom) N Skupski
3 | (Portugal) F Cabral (Austria) L Miedler | w/o
(Brazil) R Matos (Brazil) M Melo | 6^{4} | 6 | [13]
2 | (India) Y Bhambri (New Zealand) M Venus | 7^{7} | 2 | [11]

Final
3 | (Portugal) F Cabral (Austria) L Miedler | 6 | 4 | [8]
(Brazil) R Matos (Brazil) M Melo | 4 | 6 | [10]
