= 2019 Tennis Challenger Hamburg – Singles =

Singles
- 2019 Tennis Challenger Hamburg

Final
- Champion: (Netherlands) Botic van de Zandschulp
- Runner-up: (Spain) Bernabé Zapata Miralles
- Score: 6–3, 5–7, 6–1

Events
Singles	Doubles
- Tennis Challenger Hamburg

This was the first edition of the tournament.

Botic van de Zandschulp won the title after defeating Bernabé Zapata Miralles 6–3, 5–7, 6–1 in the final.

== Seeds ==
All seeds receive a bye into the second round.

1. (Italy) Salvatore Caruso (semifinals)
2. (Sweden) Elias Ymer (semifinals)
3. (Italy) Gianluca Mager (third round)
4. (Ukraine) Sergiy Stakhovsky (third round)
5. (Italy) Alessandro Giannessi (second round)
6. (Italy) Federico Gaio (quarterfinals)
7. (Netherlands) Robin Haase (second round)
8. (Germany) Oscar Otte (second round)
9. (Serbia) Viktor Troicki (third round)
10. (Italy) Filippo Baldi (second round)
11. (Serbia) Nikola Milojević (second round)
12. (Germany) Rudolf Molleker (second round)
13. (Spain) Pedro Martínez (second round)
14. (Netherlands) Tallon Griekspoor (second round, retired)
15. (Slovakia) Filip Horanský (third round)
16. (Spain) Nicola Kuhn (withdrew)

== Draw ==
Key

- Q = Qualifier
- WC = Wild card
- LL = Lucky loser
- Alt = Alternate
- ITF = ITF entry
- PR = Protected ranking
- SR = Special ranking
- SE = Special exempt
- JE = Junior exempt
- JR = Junior Accelerator Programme entrant
- CO = College Accelerator Programme entrant
- NG = Next Gen Accelerator Program entrant
- w/o = Walkover
- r = Retired
- d = Defaulted

=== Finals ===
Quarterfinals
1	(Italy) Salvatore Caruso	6	6
6	(Italy) Federico Gaio	3	2
(Netherlands) Botic van de Zandschulp	6	7
(Germany) Cedrik-Marcel Stebe	2	5
(Spain) Bernabé Zapata Miralles	7^{9}	6
Alt	(Turkey) Altuğ Çelikbilek	6^{7}	4
WC	(Germany) Daniel Altmaier	6	3	6^{7}
2	(Sweden) Elias Ymer	4	6	7^{9}

Semifinals
1	(Italy) Salvatore Caruso	6	4	2
(Netherlands) Botic van de Zandschulp	4	6	6
(Spain) Bernabé Zapata Miralles	7^{7}	7^{9}
2	(Sweden) Elias Ymer	6^{5}	6^{7}

Final
(Netherlands) Botic van de Zandschulp	6	5	6
(Spain) Bernabé Zapata Miralles	3	7	1

=== Top half ===
==== Section 1 ====
First round
(Germany) D Masur	6	6
WC	(Germany) L Wessels	2	4
(Spain) A Menéndez Maceiras	3	4
(Italy) S Napolitano	6	6
(Turkey) C İlkel	7	6
WC	(Germany) J Härteis	5	1
(Czech Republic) V Kopřiva	6^{2}	6	2
(Italy) GM Moroni	7^{7}	3	6

Second round
1	(Italy) S Caruso	2	6	7^{7}
(Germany) D Masur	6	3	6^{5}
(Italy) S Napolitano	7^{7}	7
13	(Spain) P Martínez	6^{2}	5
12	(Germany) R Molleker	6^{3}	6	1
(Turkey) C İlkel	7^{7}	2	6
(Italy) GM Moroni	1	2
6	(Italy) F Gaio	6	6

Third round
1	(Italy) S Caruso	7	2	6
(Italy) S Napolitano	5	6	2
(Turkey) C İlkel	3	3
6	(Italy) F Gaio	6	6

Quarterfinals
1	(Italy) S Caruso	6	6
6	(Italy) F Gaio	3	2

==== Section 2 ====
First round
WC	(Germany) M Welte	3	0
(United Kingdom) J Choinski	6	6
LL	(Germany) Osman Torski	1	3
(Netherlands) B van de Zandschulp	6	6
(Kazakhstan) A Nedovyesov	4	2
(Germany) T Kamke	6	6
(Italy) R Marcora	3	0^{r}
(Germany) C-M Stebe	6	0

Second round
3	(Italy) G Mager	6	6
(United Kingdom) J Choinski	4	4
(Netherlands) B van de Zandschulp	6	0
14	(Netherlands) T Griekspoor	0	0^{r}
11	(Serbia) N Milojević	6	3	3
(Germany) T Kamke	3	6	6
(Germany) C-M Stebe	6	6
5	(Italy) A Giannessi	2	3

Third round
3	(Italy) G Mager	3	2
(Netherlands) B van de Zandschulp	6	6
(Germany) T Kamke	3	2
(Germany) C-M Stebe	6	6

Quarterfinals
(Netherlands) B van de Zandschulp	6	7
(Germany) C-M Stebe	2	5

=== Bottom half ===
==== Section 3 ====
First round
(Spain) B Zapata Miralles	2	7^{11}	6
(Germany) M Zverev	6	6^{9}	4
(Bosnia and Herzegovina) M Bašić	3	6	5
(Belgium) S Darcis	6	4	7
(Slovakia) A Molčan	5	1
(Spain) T Robredo	7	6
(United States) M Cressy	7^{7}	3	6
LL	(Poland) K Żuk	6^{5}	6	1

Second round
8	(Germany) O Otte	2	2
(Spain) B Zapata Miralles	6	6
(Belgium) S Darcis	6	6^{3}	3
9	(Serbia) V Troicki	4	7^{7}	6
Alt	(Turkey) A Çelikbilek	6	4	6
(Spain) T Robredo	2	6	0
(United States) M Cressy	6^{6}	6^{4}
4	(Ukraine) S Stakhovsky	7^{8}	7^{7}

Third round
(Spain) B Zapata Miralles	6	7^{7}
9	(Serbia) V Troicki	3	6^{4}
Alt	(Turkey) A Çelikbilek	7^{8}	6
4	(Ukraine) S Stakhovsky	6^{6}	2

Quarterfinals
(Spain) B Zapata Miralles	7^{9}	6
Alt	(Turkey) A Çelikbilek	6^{7}	4

==== Section 4 ====
First round
Q	(Netherlands) J Sels	7^{7}	6
WC	(Germany) Niklas Guttau	6^{0}	2
Q	(Ukraine) Vadym Ursu	1	5
WC	(Germany) D Altmaier	6	7
PR	(Austria) M Neuchrist	4	6^{4}
(Italy) A Pellegrino	6	7^{7}
(Australia) J-P Smith	5	4
(Belgium) R Bemelmans	7	6

Second round
7	(Netherlands) R Haase	7^{7}	6^{4}	3
Q	(Netherlands) J Sels	6^{4}	7^{7}	6
WC	(Germany) D Altmaier	6	6
10	(Italy) F Baldi	2	4
15	(Slovakia) F Horanský	4	7^{7}	6
(Italy) A Pellegrino	6	6^{3}	1
(Belgium) R Bemelmans	7^{7}	6^{5}	3
2	(Sweden) E Ymer	6^{5}	7^{7}	6

Third round
Q	(Netherlands) J Sels	4	6^{8}
WC	(Germany) D Altmaier	6	7^{10}
15	(Slovakia) F Horanský	5	5
2	(Sweden) E Ymer	7	7

Quarterfinals
WC	(Germany) D Altmaier	6	3	6^{7}
2	(Sweden) E Ymer	4	6	7^{9}
