= 2025 BMW Open – Singles =

Singles
- 2025 BMW Open

Final
- Champion: (Germany) Alexander Zverev
- Runner-up: (United States) Ben Shelton
- Score: 6–2, 6–4

Details
- Draw: 32 (4 Q / 3 WC)
- Seeds: 8

Events
| Singles | Doubles |
- BMW Open

Alexander Zverev defeated Ben Shelton in the final, 6–2, 6–4 to win the singles tennis title at the 2025 Bavarian International Tennis Championships. It was his third Munich title (after 2017 and 2018) and 24th career ATP Tour title. Shelton was the first American man to reach a clay court final at ATP 500 level or higher since Andre Agassi at the 2002 Italian Open.

Jan-Lennard Struff was the defending champion, but lost in the first round to Francisco Cerúndolo.

Aged 17 years and 1 month old, Diego Dedura-Palomero was the first player born in 2008 or later to win an ATP Tour match, after Denis Shapovalov retired from their first-round match.

== Seeds ==
1. (Germany) Alexander Zverev (champion)
2. (United States) Ben Shelton (final)
3. (Canada) Félix Auger-Aliassime (first round)
4. (France) Ugo Humbert (second round)
5. (Argentina) Francisco Cerúndolo (semifinals)
6. (Czech Republic) Jakub Menšík (first round)
7. (Czech Republic) Jiří Lehečka (withdrew)
8. (Canada) Denis Shapovalov (first round, retired)

== Draw ==
Key

- Q = Qualifier
- WC = Wild card
- LL = Lucky loser
- Alt = Alternate
- ITF = ITF entry
- PR = Protected ranking
- SR = Special ranking
- SE = Special exempt
- JE = Junior exempt
- JR = Junior Accelerator Programme entrant
- CO = College Accelerator Programme entrant
- NG = Next Gen Accelerator Program entrant
- w/o = Walkover
- r = Retired
- d = Defaulted

=== Finals ===
Semifinals
1 | (Germany) Alexander Zverev | 7^{7} | 6
(Hungary) Fábián Marozsán | 6^{3} | 3
5 | (Argentina) Francisco Cerúndolo | 6 | 6^{7} | 4
2 | (United States) Ben Shelton | 2 | 7^{9} | 6

Final
1 | (Germany) Alexander Zverev | 6 | 6
2 | (United States) Ben Shelton | 2 | 4

=== Top half ===
First round
1 | (Germany) A Zverev | 6 | 6
(France) A Müller | 4 | 1
Q | (Chinese Taipei) C-h Tseng | 6^{5} | 6^{5}
WC | (Germany) D Altmaier | 7^{7} | 7^{7}
(Netherlands) T Griekspoor | 6 | 6
Q | (United States) L Tien | 4 | 2
WC | (Germany) Y Hanfmann | 7^{7} | 4 | 6
6 | (Czech Republic) J Menšík | 6^{4} | 6 | 3
4 | (France) U Humbert | 4 | 6 | 6
(Chile) N Jarry | 6 | 3 | 2
WC | (Germany) J Engel | 4 | 1
(Hungary) F Marozsán | 6 | 6
(Belgium) Z Bergs | 6^{5} | 6 | 7
Q | (Kazakhstan) A Bublik | 7^{7} | 4 | 5
LL | (Germany) D Dedura-Palomero | 7^{7} | 3
8 | (Canada) D Shapovalov | 6^{2} | 0^{r}

Second round
1 | (Germany) A Zverev | 6 | 6
WC | (Germany) D Altmaier | 3 | 2
(Netherlands) T Griekspoor | 7^{7} | 6
WC | (Germany) Y Hanfmann | 6^{3} | 3
4 | (France) U Humbert | 4 | 4
(Hungary) F Marozsán | 6 | 6
(Belgium) Z Bergs | 6 | 6
LL | (Germany) D Dedura-Palomero | 1 | 1

Quarterfinals
1 | (Germany) A Zverev | 6^{6} | 7^{7} | 6
(Netherlands) T Griekspoor | 7^{8} | 6^{3} | 4
(Hungary) F Marozsán | 6 | 7^{7}
(Belgium) Z Bergs | 3 | 6^{4}

Semifinals
1 | (Germany) A Zverev | 7^{7} | 6
(Hungary) F Marozsán | 6^{3} | 3

=== Bottom half ===
First round
5 | (Argentina) F Cerúndolo | 6 | 6
(Germany) J-L Struff | 0 | 2
(Italy) F Cobolli | 7^{7} | 3 | 4
LL | (Kazakhstan) A Shevchenko | 6^{2} | 6 | 6
LL | (United Kingdom) B Harris | 2 | 7^{7} | 4
(Belgium) D Goffin | 6 | 6^{2} | 6
(Argentina) M Navone | 2 | 6 | 7^{7}
3 | (Canada) F Auger-Aliassime | 6 | 4 | 6^{3}
LL | (Australia) C O'Connell | 6^{3} | 6^{3}
(Italy) L Darderi | 7^{7} | 7^{7}
(Serbia) M Kecmanović | 6 | 6^{2} | 7^{11}
(United States) M Giron | 2 | 7^{7} | 6^{9}
(Spain) R Bautista Agut | 4 | 6 | 4
LL | (Netherlands) B van de Zandschulp | 6 | 3 | 6
Q | (Croatia) B Gojo | 6 | 6^{6} | 6^{3}
2 | (United States) B Shelton | 4 | 7^{8} | 7^{7}

Second round
5 | (Argentina) F Cerúndolo | 6 | 6
LL | (Kazakhstan) A Shevchenko | 3 | 2
(Belgium) D Goffin | 0 | 7 | 6
(Argentina) M Navone | 6 | 5 | 1
(Italy) L Darderi | 2 | 7^{7} | 6
(Serbia) M Kecmanović | 6 | 6^{4} | 4
LL | (Netherlands) B van de Zandschulp | 6^{1} | 3
2 | (United States) B Shelton | 7^{7} | 6

Quarterfinals
5 | (Argentina) F Cerúndolo | 6 | 6
(Belgium) D Goffin | 2 | 4
(Italy) L Darderi | 4 | 3
2 | (United States) B Shelton | 6 | 6

Semifinals
5 | (Argentina) F Cerúndolo | 6 | 6^{7} | 4
2 | (United States) B Shelton | 2 | 7^{9} | 6

== Qualifying ==
=== Seeds ===
1. (China) Bu Yunchaokete (withdrew)
2. (United States) Learner Tien (qualified)
3. (Kazakhstan) Alexander Bublik (qualified)
4. (Australia) Christopher O'Connell (first round, lucky loser)
5. (Australia) Aleksandar Vukic (first round)
6. (Australia) Rinky Hijikata (first round)
7. (Netherlands) Botic van de Zandschulp (qualifying competition, lucky loser)
8. (United States) Mackenzie McDonald (first round)

=== Qualifiers ===
1. (Croatia) Borna Gojo
2. (United States) Learner Tien
3. (Kazakhstan) Alexander Bublik
4. (Chinese Taipei) Tseng Chun-hsin

=== Lucky losers ===
1. (Kazakhstan) Alexander Shevchenko
2. (Netherlands) Botic van de Zandschulp
3. (United Kingdom) Billy Harris
4. (Germany) Diego Dedura-Palomero
5. (Australia) Christopher O'Connell

=== Qualifying draw ===
==== First qualifier ====
First round
Alt | (Germany) Daniel Masur | 3 | 6^{6}
PR | (Croatia) Borna Gojo | 6 | 7^{8}
(Kazakhstan) Alexander Shevchenko | 6 | 1 | 6
6 | (Australia) Rinky Hijikata | 4 | 6 | 3

Qualifying competition
PR | (Croatia) Borna Gojo | 6 | 6
(Kazakhstan) Alexander Shevchenko | 4 | 4

==== Second qualifier ====
First round
2 | (United States) Learner Tien | 7 | 2 | 6
WC | (Germany) Henri Squire | 5 | 6 | 0
WC | (Germany) Max Hans Rehberg | 3 | 1
7 | (Netherlands) Botic van de Zandschulp | 6 | 6

Qualifying competition
2 | (United States) Learner Tien | 6 | 6
7 | (Netherlands) Botic van de Zandschulp | 2 | 2

==== Third qualifier ====
First round
3 | (Kazakhstan) Alexander Bublik | 6 | 6
(Switzerland) Alexander Ritschard | 2 | 3
WC | (Germany) Diego Dedura-Palomero | 6 | 6
8 | (United States) Mackenzie McDonald | 3 | 1

Qualifying competition
3 | (Kazakhstan) Alexander Bublik | 6 | 6
WC | (Germany) Diego Dedura-Palomero | 3 | 3

==== Fourth qualifier ====
First round
4 | (Australia) Christopher O'Connell | 3 | 2
(Chinese Taipei) Tseng Chun-hsin | 6 | 6
(United Kingdom) Billy Harris | 3 | 6 | 6
5 | (Australia) Aleksandar Vukic | 6 | 3 | 4

Qualifying competition
(Chinese Taipei) Tseng Chun-hsin | 4 | 7^{7} | 6
(United Kingdom) Billy Harris | 6 | 6^{5} | 2
