= 2019 Tennis Challenger Hamburg – Doubles =

Doubles
- 2019 Tennis Challenger Hamburg

Final
- Champions: (United States) James Cerretani (United States) Maxime Cressy
- Runners-up: (United Kingdom) Ken Skupski (Australia) John-Patrick Smith
- Score: 6–4, 6–4

Events
Singles	Doubles
Tennis Challenger Hamburg	· 2020 →

This was the first edition of the tournament.

James Cerretani and Maxime Cressy won the title after defeating Ken Skupski and John-Patrick Smith 6–4, 6–4 in the final.

== Seeds ==
1. (United Kingdom) Ken Skupski / (Australia) John-Patrick Smith (final)
2. (Netherlands) Sander Arends / (Netherlands) David Pel (first round)
3. (Serbia) Nikola Čačić / (Croatia) Antonio Šančić (first round)
4. (Germany) Andre Begemann / (Romania) Florin Mergea (first round)

== Draw ==
=== Key ===
- Q = Qualifier
- WC = Wild card
- LL = Lucky loser
- Alt = Alternate
- ITF = ITF entry
- PR = Protected ranking
- SR = Special ranking
- SE = Special exempt
- JE = Junior exempt
- JR = Junior Accelerator Programme entrant
- CO = College Accelerator Programme entrant
- NG = Next Gen Accelerator Program entrant
- w/o = Walkover
- r = Retired
- d = Defaulted

First round
1	(United Kingdom) K Skupski (Australia) J-P Smith	6	7^{7}
(Kazakhstan) A Golubev (Kazakhstan) A Nedovyesov	4	6^{0}
Alt	(Turkey) A Çelikbilek (Turkey) C İlkel	6	7^{7}
(Spain) G Granollers (Spain) S Martos Gornés	4	6^{3}
4	(Germany) A Begemann (Romania) F Mergea	4	6	[7]
(Australia) R Junaid (India) P Raja	6	3	[10]
PR	(Serbia) V Troicki (Serbia) N Zimonjić	6	6
(Spain) P Martínez (Spain) B Zapata Miralles	3	3
WC	(Germany) L Wessels (Germany) M Zverev	5	6	[7]
Alt	(Belgium) R Bemelmans (Germany) D Masur	7	4	[10]
(United States) J Cerretani (United States) M Cressy	6	6
3	(Serbia) N Čačić (Croatia) A Šančić	4	3
WC	(Germany) T Kamke (Germany) J Reister	6	3	[8]
(Spain) A Menéndez Maceiras (Ukraine) S Stakhovsky	4	6	[10]
(Poland) K Drzewiecki (Poland) S Walków	5	7^{8}	[16]
2	(Netherlands) S Arends (Netherlands) D Pel	7	6^{6}	[14]

Quarterfinals
1	(United Kingdom) K Skupski (Australia) J-P Smith	6	7
Alt	(Turkey) A Çelikbilek (Turkey) C İlkel	2	5
(Australia) R Junaid (India) P Raja	4	6^{4}
PR	(Serbia) V Troicki (Serbia) N Zimonjić	6	7^{7}
Alt	(Belgium) R Bemelmans (Germany) D Masur	6^{7}	6^{5}
(United States) J Cerretani (United States) M Cressy	7^{9}	7^{7}
(Spain) A Menéndez Maceiras (Ukraine) S Stakhovsky	6	7^{7}
(Poland) K Drzewiecki (Poland) S Walków	4	6^{4}

Semifinals
1	(United Kingdom) K Skupski (Australia) J-P Smith	6	6
PR	(Serbia) V Troicki (Serbia) N Zimonjić	1	2
(United States) J Cerretani (United States) M Cressy	6	6
(Spain) A Menéndez Maceiras (Ukraine) S Stakhovsky	1	4

Final
1	(United Kingdom) K Skupski (Australia) J-P Smith	4	4
(United States) J Cerretani (United States) M Cressy	6	6
