= 2025 BMW Open – Doubles =

Doubles
- 2025 BMW Open

Final
- Champions: (Sweden) André Göransson (Netherlands) Sem Verbeek
- Runners-up: (Germany) Kevin Krawietz (Germany) Tim Pütz
- Score: 6–4, 6–4

Events
Singles	Doubles
← 2024 ·	BMW Open	· 2026 →

André Göransson and Sem Verbeek defeated Kevin Krawietz and Tim Pütz in the final, 6–4, 6–4 to win the doubles tennis title at the 2025 Bavarian International Tennis Championships. It was the first ATP 500 title for both players, third ATP Tour title for Göransson and second for Verbeek.

Yuki Bhambri and Albano Olivetti were the reigning champions, but Olivetti chose to play in Barcelona instead. Bhambri partnered Robert Galloway, but lost in the first round to Krawietz and Pütz.

== Seeds ==
1. (Germany) Kevin Krawietz / (Germany) Tim Pütz (final)
2. (Spain) Marcel Granollers / (Argentina) Horacio Zeballos (first round)
3. (United States) Christian Harrison / (United States) Evan King (first round)
4. (United Kingdom) Jamie Murray / (United States) Rajeev Ram (first round)

== Draw ==
Key

- Q = Qualifier
- WC = Wild card
- LL = Lucky loser
- Alt = Alternate
- ITF = ITF entry
- PR = Protected ranking
- SR = Special ranking
- SE = Special exempt
- JE = Junior exempt
- JR = Junior Accelerator Programme entrant
- CO = College Accelerator Programme entrant
- NG = Next Gen Accelerator Program entrant
- w/o = Walkover
- r = Retired
- d = Defaulted

=== Draw ===
First round
1	(Germany) K Krawietz (Germany) T Pütz	6	7^{7}
(India) Y Bhambri (United States) R Galloway	4	6^{5}
(France) S Doumbia (France) F Reboul	6	6
(Czech Republic) A Pavlásek (United States) J Withrow	2	4
4	(United Kingdom) J Murray (United States) R Ram	4	3
(India) R Bopanna (United States) B Shelton	6	6
(Belgium) S Gillé (Poland) J Zieliński	6	3	[10]
WC	(Germany) A Mies (Germany) J-L Struff	3	6	[3]
(Sweden) A Göransson (Netherlands) S Verbeek	3	6	[10]
(Argentina) F Cerúndolo (Italy) F Cobolli	6	4	[6]
Alt	(Argentina) G Andreozzi (France) T Arribagé	6	6
3	(United States) C Harrison (United States) E King	0	3
WC	(Germany) J Schnaitter (Germany) M Wallner	3	6	[10]
(Brazil) R Matos (Brazil) M Melo	6	4	[5]
Q	(Germany) J Engel (Germany) MH Rehberg	7	7
2	(Spain) M Granollers (Argentina) H Zeballos	5	5

Quarterfinals
1	(Germany) K Krawietz (Germany) T Pütz	6	6
(France) S Doumbia (France) F Reboul	3	4
(India) R Bopanna (United States) B Shelton	4	5
(Belgium) S Gillé (Poland) J Zieliński	6	7
(Sweden) A Göransson (Netherlands) S Verbeek	7^{7}	4	[10]
Alt	(Argentina) G Andreozzi (France) T Arribagé	6^{4}	6	[6]
WC	(Germany) J Schnaitter (Germany) M Wallner	6	6
Q	(Germany) J Engel (Germany) MH Rehberg	3	3

Semifinals
1	(Germany) K Krawietz (Germany) T Pütz	4	6	[10]
(Belgium) S Gillé (Poland) J Zieliński	6	3	[8]
(Sweden) A Göransson (Netherlands) S Verbeek	6	7^{7}
WC	(Germany) J Schnaitter (Germany) M Wallner	1	6^{5}

Final
1	(Germany) K Krawietz (Germany) T Pütz	4	4
(Sweden) A Göransson (Netherlands) S Verbeek	6	6

== Qualifying ==
=== Seeds ===
1. (Croatia) Ivan Dodig / (Tunisia) Skander Mansouri (first round)
2. (Netherlands) Robin Haase / (Germany) Hendrik Jebens (qualifying competition)

=== Qualifiers ===
1. (Germany) Justin Engel / (Germany) Max Hans Rehberg

=== Qualifying draw ===
First round
1	(Croatia) Ivan Dodig (Tunisia) Skander Mansouri	6	3	[7]
WC	(Germany) Justin Engel (Germany) Max Hans Rehberg	1	6	[10]
(Australia) Rinky Hijikata (France) Grégoire Jacq	6	4	[4]
2	(Netherlands) Robin Haase (Germany) Hendrik Jebens	4	6	[10]

Qualifying competition
WC	(Germany) Justin Engel (Germany) Max Hans Rehberg	6	4	[10]
2	(Netherlands) Robin Haase (Germany) Hendrik Jebens	4	6	[5]
