= Botic van de Zandschulp =

Current number 1 player from the Netherlands

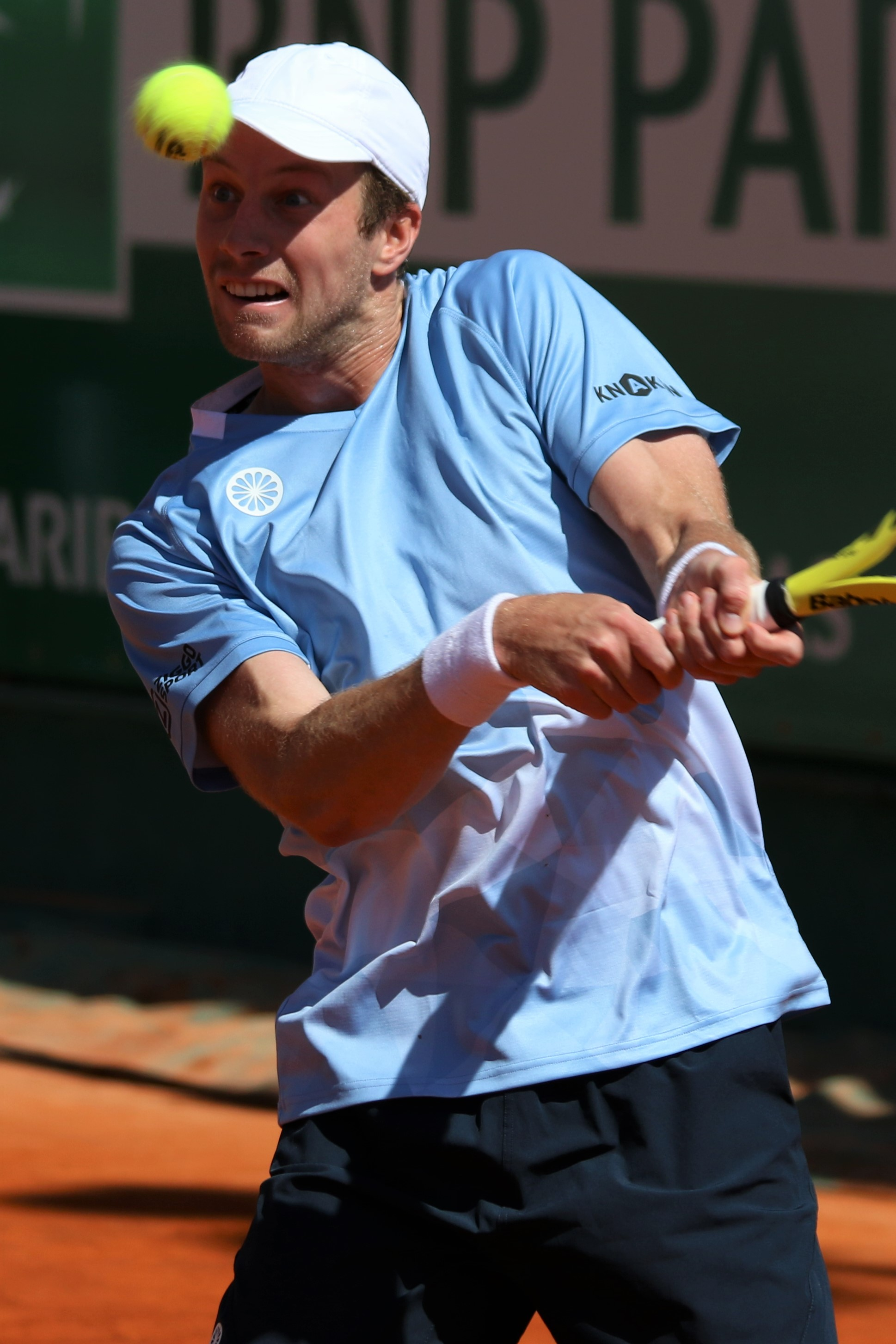
- Van de Zandschulp at the 2022 Monte-Carlo Masters
- Country (sports): Netherlands
- Residence: Veenendaal, Netherlands
- Born: 4 October 1995 (age 31) Wageningen, Netherlands
- Height: 1.91 m (6 ft 3 in)
- Turned pro: 2016
- Plays: Right-handed (two-handed backhand)
- Coach: Raemon Sluiter (September 2025–), Peter Lucassen (–2023, 2024–June 2025); Sven Groeneveld (2023–2024)
- Prize money: US $6,966,137

Singles
- Career record: 137–133
- Career titles: 0
- Highest ranking: No. 22 (29 August 2022)
- Current ranking: No. 40 (9 November 2026)

Grand Slam singles results
- Australian Open: 3R (2022, 2026)
- French Open: 3R (2022)
- Wimbledon: 4R (2022)
- US Open: QF (2021, 2026)

Doubles
- Career record: 42–38
- Career titles: 2
- Highest ranking: No. 60 (22 May 2023)
- Current ranking: No. 207 (31 August 2026)

Grand Slam doubles results
- Australian Open: 3R (2025, 2026)
- French Open: 2R (2024)
- Wimbledon: 2R (2026)
- US Open: 1R (2023, 2024)

Team competitions
- Davis Cup: F (2024)
- Last updated on: 7 September 2026.

Botic van de Zandschulp (Dutch pronunciation: [ˈboːtɪk fɑn də ˈzɑntsxʏl(ə)p]; born 4 October 1995) is a Dutch professional tennis player. He has a career-high ATP singles ranking of world No. 22 achieved on 29 August 2022 and a best doubles ranking of No. 60, reached on 22 May 2023. He is currently the No. 1 singles player from the Netherlands.

Van de Zandschulp has won two ATP Tour doubles titles. He represents the Netherlands at the Davis Cup.

Van de Zandschulp's breakthrough occurred at the 2021 US Open, when as a qualifier he reached the quarterfinals of the tournament. That season, he became the third man to progress to the main draw of all four majors through qualifying in the same year, the others being Elias Ymer in 2015 and Frank Dancevic in 2011.

== Professional career ==
=== 2021: Major debut, US Open quarterfinal as qualifier, top 100, Dutch No. 1 ===
Van de Zandschulp qualified for the first time in the main singles draw of a Grand Slam tournament at the 2021 Australian Open, where he was defeated by fellow qualifier Carlos Alcaraz. As a result, he reached a career-high of No. 145 on 22 February 2021 and was the No. 1 Dutch tennis singles player for a brief period from 8 February 2021 until 22 March 2021. He also qualified for the second major in 2021 and in his career at the French Open and reached the second round for his first Grand Slam win with a defeat over No. 19 seed Hubert Hurkacz.

In June 2021, he was upgraded to the main draw at Wimbledon, for his third major debut in a row in 2021, as a lucky loser following the late withdrawal of the 4th seed Dominic Thiem. He beat qualifier Grégoire Barrère in the first round and lost to 7th seed Matteo Berrettini in the second round. In July following Wimbledon, as the second seed, he reached the final at the 2021 Dutch Open in Amersfoort. He was defeated by his compatriot and top seed Tallon Griekspoor in the final. He became the No. 1 Dutch player again on 30 August 2021 at world No. 117 in the rankings.

Despite having only five ATP Tour match wins before the US Open, van de Zandschulp qualified for the last major of the year, thus becoming the only man to progress to the main draw of all four majors through qualifying that year. He reached the third round of a major for the first time, defeating Carlos Taberner and world No. 11 and eight seed Casper Ruud. Next, he defeated Facundo Bagnis to reach the fourth round. There he defeated world No. 14 and eleventh seed Diego Schwartzman in five sets to reach his maiden major quarterfinal, where he lost to eventual champion Daniil Medvedev, becoming the only player to take a set from Medvedev in the tournament. He also became only the third male qualifier in the history of the US Open (after Nicolas Escudé in 1999 and Gilles Müller in 2008) to reach the quarterfinals. He also became the first Dutch man to reach the quarterfinals of a major since Sjeng Schalken at the 2003 US Open and 2004 Wimbledon. As a result, he improved 55 spots in the singles rankings, entering the top 100 for the first time in his career at world No. 62 on 13 September 2021.

Van de Zandschulp made his debut at a Masters 1000-level event at the Indian Wells Masters by qualifying as the top seed into the main draw. He lost to Marcos Giron in the first round in three sets.

At the 2021 St. Petersburg Open, van de Zandschulp entered as a qualifier and beat Yoshihito Nishioka, Sebastian Korda, and for the biggest win in his career so far, world No.6 and top seed Andrey Rublev in the quarterfinals. He lost to Croatian Marin Čilić in the semifinals. At the 2021 Stockholm Open, he reached the quarterfinals where he lost to second seed Félix Auger-Aliassime. He entered the top 60 at World No. 57 on 15 November 2021

=== 2022: Major fourth round, ATP singles final & doubles title, top 25 ===
Van de Zandschulp started his year by reaching the quarterfinals at the Melbourne Summer Set by defeating Adrian Mannarino and 8th seed Mackenzie McDonald in straight sets. He lost to Grigor Dimitrov in the quarterfinals despite having match points on serve in the third set.

He reached the third round at the Melbourne where he lost to world No. 2, Daniil Medvedev. As a result, he made his top 50 debut in the rankings on 31 January 2022.

Van de Zandschulp reached the third round in Indian Wells, where he beat Tennys Sandgren and scoring his second top 10 victory over world no. 9 Félix Auger-Aliassime in three sets. He lost to Miomir Kecmanović in the third round in straight sets. In Miami, he lost to Mikhail Kukushkin in the first round.

His next tournament was Marrakech, where he beat Hugo Dellien in three sets in the first round, and qualifier Vít Kopřiva in straight sets in the second round to make his fourth ATP Tour-level quarterfinal overall and second of 2022. He lost to Alex Molčan in the quarterfinals. In Monte Carlo, he lost to Sebastian Korda in the first round. He reached the top 40 on 25 April 2022.

Seeded eight in Munich, Van de Zandschulp defeated Brandon Nakashima and Egor Gerasimov to reach a third ATP Tour-level quarterfinal in 2022. Next, he upset second seed Casper Ruud in straight sets to reach the semifinals, where he beat 7th seed Miomir Kecmanović in a nearly three-hour match to become the first Dutch male player to reach an ATP Tour-level singles final since Robin Haase at Gstaad in 2016. He was forced to retire in the final against Holger Rune due to chest pain.

He saved three match points at the Madrid Open to advance to the second round for the first time at this Masters against Pablo Carreño Busta. At the Italian Open, he also reached the second round for the first time on his debut at this Masters, defeating Korda this time. As a result, he reached the top 30 at World No. 29 on 16 May 2022.

Seeded for the first time at a major at the 2022 French Open, he also reached the third round for the first time at this major but lost to 13-time champion and childhood idol Rafael Nadal in their first time meeting.

Seeded sixth, van de Zandschulp played his first grass tournament on home soil at s'Hertogenbosch, where he lost to Emil Ruusuvuori in three sets. The following week at Queen's Club, he reached the first ATP 500 semifinal of his career by defeating qualifier Paul Jubb, Grigor Dimitrov and Alejandro Davidovich Fokina. He became the first Dutchman to advance to the semifinals since Sjeng Schalken and Raemon Sluiter in 2002.

Van de Zandschulp reached a career-high in the top 25 on 27 June 2022 at the start of the 2022 Wimbledon Championships. Seeded 21st he reached the fourth round where he lost to Rafael Nadal in straight sets.

At the 2022 Winston-Salem Open, he reached his third tour-level semifinals of the season defeating 10th seed Benjamin Bonzi in straight sets with two tiebreaks.

In October, van de Zandschulp reached second round of Astana Open, where he lost in straight sets to the eventual champion, Novak Djokovic. At the European Open in Antwerp, he won his maiden title in doubles partnering Tallon Griekspoor.

=== 2023: Masters fourth round & first top 5 win, Second ATP final ===
Van de Zandschulp started his 2023 season at the Maharashtra Open in Pune, India. Seeded second, he reached the semifinals where he lost to Benjamin Bonzi. Seeded 32nd at the Australian Open, he was defeated in the second round by compatriot Tallon Griekspoor.

In February, van de Zandschulp competed at the Rotterdam Open. He lost in the second round to sixth seed, world No. 11, and eventual champion, Daniil Medvedev. Seeded eighth at the Qatar ExxonMobil Open, he was eliminated in the second round by qualifier Alexandre Müller. However, in doubles, he and his partner, Constant Lestienne, reached the final and lost to Rohan Bopanna/Matthew Ebden. In Dubai, he beat sixth seed and world No. 14, Karen Khachanov, in the first round. He ended up losing in the quarterfinals to second seed, world No. 6, defending champion, and eventual finalist, Andrey Rublev.

In March, seeded 28th at the Indian Wells Masters, he retired during his second-round match against Ilya Ivashka. Seeded 26th, he got a first-round bye at the 2023 Miami Open, and reached his first Masters 1000 fourth round defeating Alexei Popyrin and third seed and world No. 4, Casper Ruud, for his first top-5 win of his career.

In April, seeded fourth this time in Munich, van de Zandschulp defeated Aslan Karatsev and Marcos Giron to reach the semifinals. Next, he upset second seed and world No. 10 Taylor Fritz in straight sets to again reach the final for his second top-10 win of the season and set up a rematch from the previous year with Holger Rune. He lost in the final to Rune in three sets, despite holding four championship points.

In May, van de Zandschulp hired fellow Dutchman Sven Groeneveld as his new coach, parting ways with long-time coach Lucassen. He reached his first Masters final in doubles at the 2023 Italian Open partnering compatriot Robin Haase.

=== 2024: Win over World No. 3, US Open third round, Davis Cup finalist ===
In mid April, after a loss in the second round to fourth seed Jan-Lennard Struff, he left the top 100 in the rankings, unable to defend his runner-up points at the 2024 BMW Open in Munich.

He returned to the top 75 on 5 August 2024, following two finals showings, at the 2024 Brawo Open and at the Platzmann Open.

At the 2024 US Open, he reached the second round for a fourth consecutive year with a win over Denis Shapovalov. In the second round, he defeated third seed, former world No. 1 and US Open champion Carlos Alcaraz in straight sets, ending his 15 match Grand Slam win streak. It marked Van de Zandschulp's first top 3 win and first over a Grand Slam winner. He also became the first Dutchman to defeat a top 3 player at the US Open since 1991, when Paul Haarhuis defeated top seed and world No. 1 Boris Becker. Van de Zandschulp lost his next match to 25th seed Jack Draper.

In November, van de Zandschulp helped the Netherlands reach the final at the 2024 Davis Cup for the first time in the country's history. The Netherlands were drawn against Spain in the quarterfinals. Van de Zandschulp defeated Rafael Nadal in the last singles match of the former World No. 1's career, before pairing up with Wesley Koolhof to defeat Carlos Alcaraz and Marcel Granollers in the deciding doubles match. In the semifinals, van de Zandschulp and Tallon Griekspoor both won singles matches against Germany. They lost to Italy in the final.

=== 2025: Top 10 win, Masters third round, third ATP final ===
Ranked No. 85, van de Zandschulp entered the main draw of the 2025 BNP Paribas Open as a lucky loser after the late withdrawal of Facundo Diaz Acosta. He defeated Nick Kyrgios to reach the second round, where he recorded an upset win against former world No. 1 and five-time Indian Wells champion Novak Djokovic.

Van de Zandschulp reached his third ATP final and first on hardcourts at the 2025 Winston-Salem Open defeating Giovanni Mpetshi Perricard. At the 2025 European Open van de Zandschulp recorded his first win over seventh seed Joao Fonseca, following a series of five straight losses since the Winston-Salem final.

=== 2026: Second major quarterfinal, back to top 40 ===
He reached the quarter finals of the 2026 US Open after upsetting world no. 7 Alex de Minaur and winning back-to-back 5 set matches against Zizou Bergs and Arthur Géa, saving a match point against the latter. He lost to eventual champion Alexander Zverev in the quarterfinals.

== Performance timeline ==
Key
W	F	SF	QF	#R	RR	Q#	DNQ	A	NH

(W) winner; (F) finalist; (SF) semifinalist; (QF) quarterfinalist; (#R) rounds 4, 3, 2, 1; (RR) round-robin stage; (Q#) qualification round; (DNQ) did not qualify; (A) absent; (NH) not held; (SR) strike rate (events won / competed); (W–L) win–loss record.
To avoid confusion and double counting, these charts are updated at the conclusion of a tournament or when the player's participation has ended.

Tournament	2019	2020	2021	2022	2023	2024	2025	2026	SR	W–L	Win %
Grand Slam tournaments
Australian Open	A	Q1	1R	3R	2R	1R	1R	3R	0 / 6	5–6	45%
French Open	A	Q2	2R	3R	1R	1R	1R	1R	0 / 6	3–6	33%
Wimbledon	A	NH	2R	4R	2R	2R	2R	2R	0 / 6	8–6	57%
US Open	A	A	QF	2R	2R	3R	1R	QF	0 / 5	12–6	67%
Win–loss	0–0	0–0	6–4	8–4	3–4	3–4	1–4	7–4	0 / 24	28–24	54%
National representation
Davis Cup	RR	G1		QF	QF	F	2R		0 / 5	12–8	60%
ATP Masters 1000
Indian Wells Open	A	NH	1R	3R	2R	1R	3R	1R	0 / 6	4–6	40%
Miami Open	A	NH	A	1R	4R	2R	A	2R	0 / 4	4–4	50%
Monte-Carlo Masters	A	NH	A	1R	2R	Q1	A	A	0 / 2	1–2	33%
Madrid Open	A	NH	A	2R	2R	2R	1R	A	0 / 4	2–4	33%
Italian Open	A	A	A	2R	2R	2R	A	3R	0 / 4	4–4	50%
Canadian Open	A	NH	A	2R	A	A	A	4R	0 / 2	4–2	67%
Cincinnati Open	A	A	A	2R	A	A	A	2R	0 / 2	2–2	50%
Shanghai Masters	A	NH			2R	2R	1R	4R	0 / 4	5–4	56%
Paris Masters	A	A	A	1R	3R	Q1	Q2	1R	0 / 3	2–3	40%
Win–loss	0–0	0–0	0–1	6–8	6–7	4–5	2–3	10–7	0 / 31	28–31	47%
Career statistics
Tournaments	0	0	10	28	24	22	21	16	121		
Titles	0	0	0	0	0	0	0	0	0		
Finals	0	0	0	1	1	0	1	0	3		
Overall win–loss	0–1	0–0	16–10	38–29	23–25	18–26	16–21	18–16	129–128		50%
Year-end ranking	198	156	57	35	50	80	77				

== ATP Tour finals ==
=== Singles: 3 (3 runner-ups) ===
Legend Grand Slam (–) ATP 1000 (–) ATP 500 (–) ATP 250 (0–3)	Finals by surface Hard (0–1) Clay (0–2) Grass (–)	Finals by setting Outdoor (0–3) Indoor (–)

Result	W–L	Date	Tournament	Tier	Surface	Opponent	Score
Loss	0–1	Apr 2022	Bavarian Championships, Germany	ATP 250	Clay	(Denmark) Holger Rune	4–3 ret.
Loss	0–2	Apr 2023	Bavarian Championships, Germany	ATP 250	Clay	(Denmark) Holger Rune	4–6, 6–1, 6–7^{(3–7)}
Loss	0–3	Aug 2025	Winston-Salem Open, US	ATP 250	Hard	(Hungary) Márton Fucsovics	3–6, 6–7^{(3–7)}

=== Doubles: 5 (2 titles, 3 runner-ups) ===
Legend Grand Slam (–) ATP 1000 (0–1) ATP 500 (0–1) ATP 250 (2–1)	Finals by surface Hard (2–2) Clay (0–1) Grass (–)	Finals by setting Outdoor (0–2) Indoor (2–1)

Result	W–L	Date	Tournament	Tier	Surface	Partner	Opponents	Score
Win	1–0	Oct 2022	European Open, Belgium	ATP 250	Hard (i)	(Netherlands) Tallon Griekspoor	(India) Rohan Bopanna (Netherlands) Matwé Middelkoop	3–6, 6–3, [10–5]
Loss	1–1	Feb 2023	Qatar Open, Qatar	ATP 250	Hard	(France) Constant Lestienne	(India) Rohan Bopanna (Australia) Matthew Ebden	7–6^{(7–5)}, 4–6, [6–10]
Loss	1–2	May 2023	Italian Open, Italy	ATP 1000	Clay	(Netherlands) Robin Haase	(Monaco) Hugo Nys (Poland) Jan Zieliński	5–7, 1–6
Loss	1–3	Feb 2024	Rotterdam Open, Netherlands	ATP 500	Hard (i)	(Netherlands) Robin Haase	(Netherlands) Wesley Koolhof (Croatia) Nikola Mektić	3–6, 5–7
Win	2–3	Feb 2025	Open Occitanie, France	ATP 250	Hard (i)	(Netherlands) Robin Haase	(Netherlands) Tallon Griekspoor (Netherlands) Bart Stevens	6–7^{(7–9)}, 6–3, [10–5]

== ATP Challenger Tour finals ==
=== Singles: 6 (1 title, 5 runner-ups) ===
Legend ATP Challenger Tour (1–5)	Finals by surface Hard (1–1) Clay (0–3) Carpet (0–1)

Result	W–L	Date	Tournament	Tier	Surface	Opponent	Score
Win	1–0	Oct 2019	Hamburg Challenger, Germany	Challenger	Hard (i)	(Spain) Bernabé Zapata Miralles	6–3, 5–7, 6–1
Loss	1–1	Feb 2020	Koblenz Open, Germany	Challenger	Hard (i)	(Czech Republic) Tomáš Macháč	3–6, 6–4, 3–6
Loss	1–2	Oct 2020	Wolffkran Open, Germany	Challenger	Carpet (i)	(Switzerland) Marc-Andrea Hüsler	7–6^{(3–7)}, 6–7^{(2–7)}, 5–7
Loss	1–3	Jul 2021	Dutch Open, Netherlands	Challenger	Clay	(Netherlands) Tallon Griekspoor	1–6, 6–3, 1–6
Loss	1–4	Jul 2024	Brawo Open, Germany	Challenger	Clay	(Spain) Roberto Carballés Baena	1–6, 3–6
Loss	1–5	Aug 2024	Platzmann Open, Germany	Challenger	Clay	(Belgium) Raphaël Collignon	6–3, 4–6, 3–6

=== Doubles: 1 (title) ===
Legend ATP Challenger Tour (1–0)

Result	W–L	Date	Tournament	Tier	Surface	Partner	Opponents	Score
Win	1–0	Aug 2017	TEAN International, Netherlands	Challenger	Clay	(Netherlands) Boy Westerhof	(Bulgaria) Alexandar Lazov (Ukraine) Volodymyr Uzhylovskyi	7–6^{(8–6)}, 7–5

== ITF Tour finals ==
=== Singles: 15 (6 titles, 9 runner-ups) ===
Legend ITF Futures/WTT (6–9)	Finals by surface Hard (2–4) Clay (3–4) Carpet (1–1)

Result	W–L	Date	Tournament	Tier	Surface	Opponent	Score
Win	1–0	Aug 2016	Netherlands F6, Rotterdam	Futures	Clay	(Netherlands) Boy Westerhof	6–2, 6–4
Win	2–0	Aug 2016	Netherlands F7, Schoonhoven	Futures	Clay	(Netherlands) Jesse Huta Galung	walkover
Win	3–0	Nov 2016	Estonia F4, Pärnu	Futures	Hard	(Estonia) Vladimir Ivanov	6–2, 6–4
Loss	3–1	Nov 2016	Czech Republic F10, Milovice	Futures	Hard	(Czech Republic) Marek Jaloviec	4–6, 1–6
Loss	3–2	Feb 2017	France F4, Lille	Futures	Hard	(Sweden) Mikael Ymer	2–6, 3–6
Loss	3–3	Jul 2017	Netherlands F3, Middelburg	Futures	Clay	(Netherlands) Thiemo de Bakker	3–6, 4–6
Loss	3–4	Aug 2017	Netherlands F5, Oldenzaal	Futures	Clay	(Netherlands) Scott Griekspoor	4–6, 1–6
Loss	3–5	Mar 2018	France F4, Toulouse	Futures	Hard	(Netherlands) Igor Sijsling	3–6, ret.
Loss	3–6	Jun 2018	Netherlands F1, Alkmaar	Futures	Clay	(Belgium) Clement Geens	6–3, 6–7^{(2–7)}, 1–6
Win	4–6	Jan 2019	M25 Nussloch, Germany	WTT	Carpet (i)	(Germany) Peter Heller	6–2, 6–2
Loss	4–7	Feb 2019	M15 Kaarst, Germany	WTT	Carpet (i)	(Netherlands) Igor Sijsling	1–6, 4–6
Win	5–7	Apr 2019	M25 Bolton, UK	WTT	Hard	(Netherlands) Igor Sijsling	7–6^{(7–2)}, 6–7^{(6–8)}, 7–5
Win	6–7	May 2019	M25 Prijedor, Bosnia and Herzegovina	WTT	Clay	(Romania) Vlad Andrei Dancu	6–4, 6–4
Loss	6–8	May 2019	M25 Doboj, Bosnia and Herzegovina	WTT	Clay	(Australia) Christopher O'Connell	4–6, 6–7^{(1–7)}
Loss	6–9	Sep 2019	M25 Stockholm, Sweden	WTT	Hard	(Poland) Kacper Żuk	6–4, 4–6, 3–6

=== Doubles: 19 (16 titles, 3 runner-ups) ===
Legend ITF Futures/WTT (16–3)	Finals by surface Hard (4–2) Clay (11–1) Carpet (1–0)

Result	W–L	Date	Tournament	Tier	Surface	Partner	Opponents	Score
Win	1–0	Aug 2016	Belgium F8, Ostend	Futures	Clay	(Netherlands) Paul Monteban	(France) Evan Furness (France) Ugo Humbert	3–6, 7–5, [10–5]
Win	2–0	Oct 2016	Estonia F5, Tallinn	Futures	Hard	(Netherlands) Niels Lootsma	(Slovakia) Karol Beck (Russia) Artem Dubrivnyy	6–3, 5–7, [10–6]
Loss	2–1	Nov 2016	Czech Republic F10, Milovice	Futures	Hard	(Netherlands) Niels Lootsma	(Czech Republic) Tomáš Papík (Czech Republic) Matěj Vocel	3–6, 6–1, [4–10]
Win	3–1	Jan 2017	Kazakhstan F2, Aktobe	Futures	Hard	(Netherlands) Niels Lootsma	(Ukraine) Vladyslav Manafov (Russia) Alexander Pavlioutchenkov	6–4, 6–4
Loss	3–2	May 2017	Sweden F1, Karlskrona	Futures	Clay	(Netherlands) David Pel	(Uruguay) Martín Cuevas (Sweden) Christian Lindell	4–6, 7–6^{(7–3)}, [9–11]
Win	4–2	Jun 2017	Netherlands F1, Alkmaar	Futures	Clay	(Netherlands) Boy Westerhof	(United States) Patrick Kypson (United States) Sam Riffice	6–2, 5–7, [14–12]
Win	5–2	Jun 2017	Netherlands F2, Breda	Futures	Clay	(Netherlands) Boy Westerhof	(Netherlands) Jesse Timmermans (Netherlands) Tim Van Terheijden	6–1, 7–5
Win	6–2	Jul 2017	Netherlands F4, Amstelveen	Futures	Clay	(Netherlands) Boy Westerhof	(Netherlands) Niels Lootsma (Germany) Christoph Negritu	6–1, 6–7^{(4–7)}, [10–3]
Win	7–2	Aug 2017	Netherlands F6, Rotterdam	Futures	Clay	(Netherlands) Boy Westerhof	(United States) Nick Chappell (United States) Hunter Reese	6–1, 6–3
Win	8–2	Aug 2017	Netherlands F7, Schoonhoven	Futures	Clay	(Netherlands) Boy Westerhof	(Netherlands) Glenn Smits (Netherlands) Colin Van Beem	6–2, 3–2 ret.
Loss	8–3	Mar 2018	France F4, Toulouse	Futures	Hard	(Netherlands) Igor Sijsling	(France) Dan Added (France) Albano Olivetti	3–6, 5–7
Win	9–3	Jun 2018	Netherlands F1, Alkmaar	Futures	Clay	(Netherlands) Roy De Valk	(Netherlands) Michiel De Krom (Netherlands) Ryan Nijboer	6–2, 6–3
Win	10–3	Jul 2018	Netherlands F2, The Hague	Futures	Clay	(Netherlands) Tim Van Terheijden	(Netherlands) Gijs Brouwer (Netherlands) Jelle Sels	3–6, 6–3, [11–9]
Win	11–3	Aug 2018	Netherlands F5, Rotterdam	Futures	Clay	(Netherlands) Glenn Smits	(Argentina) Mariano Kestelboim (Colombia) Felipe Mantilla	7–5, 7–5
Win	12–3	Sep 2018	France F18, Plaisir	Futures	Hard	(Netherlands) Glenn Smits	(Belgium) Yannick Mertens (France) Hugo Voljacques	6–7^{(6–8)}, 6–4, [10–6]
Win	13–3	Feb 2019	M15 Kaarst, Germany	WTT	Carpet (i)	(Netherlands) Igor Sijsling	(Germany) Mats Rosenkranz (United Kingdom) Mark Whitehouse	6–4, 6–4
Win	14–3	Mar 2019	M15 Sharm El Sheikh, Egypt	WTT	Hard	(Netherlands) Igor Sijsling	(India) S D Prajwal Dev (India) Adil Kalyanpur	7–6^{(10–8)}, 2–6, [10–6]
Win	15–3	Apr 2019	M25 Angers, France	WTT	Clay	(Belgium) Jeroen Vanneste	(France) Antoine Cornut-Chauvinc (France) Arthur Reymond	6–4, 7–6^{(7–3)}
Win	16–3	May 2019	M25 Prijedor, Bosnia and Herzegovina	WTT	Clay	(Netherlands) Igor Sijsling	(Montenegro) Ljubomir Čelebić (Bosnia and Herzegovina) Nerman Fatić	3–6, 6–3, [10–4]

== Wins over top 10 players ==
- Van de Zandschulp has a 10–25 record against players who were, at the time the match was played, ranked in the top 10.

Season	2021	2022	2023	2024	2025	2026	Total
Wins	1	3	2	1	1	2	10

#	Opponent	Rk	Event	Surface	Rd	Score	Rk	Ref
2021
1.	(Russia) Andrey Rublev	6	St. Petersburg, Russia	Hard (i)	QF	6–3, 6–4	69	
2022
2.	(Canada) Félix Auger-Aliassime	9	Indian Wells, US	Hard	2R	7–6^{(7–4)}, 6–7^{(4–7)}, 6–3	47	
3.	(Norway) Casper Ruud	7	Munich, Germany	Clay	QF	7–5, 6–1	40	
4.	(United Kingdom) Cameron Norrie	8	Davis Cup, Glasgow, UK	Hard (i)	GS	6–4, 6–2	35	
2023
5.	(Norway) Casper Ruud	4	Miami, US	Hard	3R	3–6, 6–4, 6–4	32	
6.	(United States) Taylor Fritz	10	Munich, Germany	Clay	SF	6–4, 7–6^{(7–2)}	29	
2024
7.	(Spain) Carlos Alcaraz	3	US Open, US	Hard	2R	6–1, 7–5, 6–4	74	
2025
8.	(Serbia) Novak Djokovic	7	Indian Wells, US	Hard	2R	6–2, 3–6, 6–1	85	
2026
9.	Daniil Medvedev	6	Canadian Open, Canada	Hard	2R	6–3, 7–6^{(7–5)}	70	
10.	(Australia) Alex de Minaur	7	US Open, US	Hard	2R	6–4, 7–5, 6–2	70	

- Key: (Rk) first use, opponent rank; (Rd) round; (Rk) 2nd use, player rank; (Ref) reference; (F) final; (SF) semifinal; (QF) quarterfinal; (#R) rounds 4, 3, 2, 1; (RR) round-robin stage; (Q#) qualifying rounds or stages (3), 2, 1.

*As of 4 September 2026

== National representation ==
=== Davis Cup participations: 7 (5–2) ===
Group membership Davis Cup Finals (3–2) Qualifying round (1–0) World Group I (1–0)	Matches by surface Hard (3–2) Clay (2–0) Grass (0–0)	Matches by type Singles (5–2) Doubles (0–0)

- ▲ ▼ indicates the outcome of the Davis Cup match followed by the score, date, place of event, the zonal classification and its phase, and the court surface.

Result	No.	Rubber	Match type	Opponent nation	Opponent player(s)	Score
▼1–2; 19 November 2019; Caja Mágica, Madrid, Spain; Davis Cup finals – round robin; hard (indoor) surface
Loss	1	I	Singles	Kazakhstan	Mikhail Kukushkin	2–6, 2–6
▲4–0; 18–19 September 2021; Carrasco Lawn Tennis Club, Montevideo, Uruguay; World Group I; clay surface
Win	2	I	Singles	Uruguay	Francisco Llanes	6–0, 6–3
▲4–0; 4–5 March 2022; Sportcampus Zuiderpark, The Hague, Netherlands; qualifying round; clay surface
Win	3	I	Singles	Canada	Alexis Galarneau	7–5, 7–6^{(11–9)}
▲2–1; 13 September 2022; Emirates Arena, Glasgow, UK; Davis Cup finals – round robin; hard (indoor) surface
Win	4	II	Singles	Kazakhstan	Alexander Bublik	3–6, 6–1, 6–4
▲2–1; 16 September 2022; Emirates Arena, Glasgow, UK; Davis Cup finals – round robin; hard (indoor) surface
Win	5	II	Singles	Great Britain	Cameron Norrie	6–4, 6–2
▲2–1; 17 September 2022; Emirates Arena, Glasgow, UK; Davis Cup finals – round robin; hard (indoor) surface
Win	6	II	Singles	United States	Taylor Fritz	6–4, 7–6^{(7–3)}
▼0–2; 22 November 2022; Martin Carpena Arena, Málaga, Spain; Davis Cup finals – quarterfinal; hard (indoor) surface
Loss	7	II	Singles	Australia	Alex de Minaur	7–5, 3–6, 4–6
