= Marko Topo =

German tennis player

- Country (sports): Serbia (until May 2022); Germany (since May 2022)
- Born: 13 September 2003 (age 23) Grafelfing, Germany
- Height: 1.88 m (6 ft 2 in)
- Turned pro: 2021
- Plays: Right-handed (two-handed backhand)
- Coach: Timon Reichelt
- Prize money: US $266,165

Singles
- Career record: 0–8
- Career titles: 0
- Highest ranking: No. 235 (2 March 2026)
- Current ranking: No. 337 (19 October 2026)

Doubles
- Career record: 0–2
- Career titles: 0
- Highest ranking: No. 573 (1 July 2024)
- Current ranking: No. 1,631 (19 October 2026)
- Last updated on: 19 October 2026.

Marko Topo (Serbian Cyrillic: Марко Топо; born 13 September 2003) is a German professional tennis player. He has a career-high ATP singles ranking of No. 235 achieved on 2 March 2026 and a best doubles ranking of No. 573, reached on 1 July 2024. Topo formerly represented Serbia.

== Career ==
=== 2021: ATP debut ===
In May 2021, Topo made his ATP main draw debut at the Belgrade Open after receiving a wildcard for the singles main draw.

In September, he obtained his first Challenger level win, in Banja Luka, thanks to a wildcard, defeating compatriot Danilo Petrović 4–6, 7–6, 6–2. In the next round he then defeated Vitaliy Sachko, winning 7-6 in the third set, thus reaching the quarterfinals and landing in the top 1000 for the first time.

=== 2022: ATP 500 and Top 500 debuts ===
In April 2022, Topo got a qualification wildcard for the ATP tournament in 2022 BMW Open in Munich, where he defeated fourth seed Henri Laaksonen in straights sets and Norbert Gombos in three sets to qualify for his second ATP main draw, where he lost to the German Oscar Otte in the first round.

At the Hamburg Open, he qualified for his first ATP 500 tournament after also receiving a qualifying wildcard but lost in the first round to Alex Molčan. He reached the top 500 at world No. 498 on 1 August 2022.

=== 2023–2025: First Challenger final, Top 250 ===
Topo received a wildcard and qualified for his fourth ATP main draw at the 2023 BMW Open in Munich, defeating Czech Vit Kopriva in the last round of qualifying. He reached a career-high ranking of No. 335 on 14 August 2023. He also received a wildcard this time for the main draw at the 2024 BMW Open.

== Performance timeline ==
Key
W	F	SF	QF	#R	RR	Q#	DNQ	A	NH

(W) winner; (F) finalist; (SF) semifinalist; (QF) quarterfinalist; (#R) rounds 4, 3, 2, 1; (RR) round-robin stage; (Q#) qualification round; (DNQ) did not qualify; (A) absent; (NH) not held; (SR) strike rate (events won / competed); (W–L) win–loss record.
To avoid confusion and double counting, these charts are updated at the conclusion of a tournament or when the player's participation has ended.

=== Singles ===
Current through the 2026 Croatia Open Umag.

	Serbia		Germany					
Tournament	2021	2022	2023	2024	2025	2026	SR	W–L
Grand Slam tournaments
Australian Open	A	A	A	A	A	A	0 / 0	0–0
French Open	A	A	A	A	A	A	0 / 0	0–0
Wimbledon	A	A	A	A	A	A	0 / 0	0–0
US Open	A	A	A	A	A		0 / 0	0–0
Career statistics
Tournaments	1	2	1	1	1	2	8	
Overall win–loss	0–1	0–2	0–1	0–1	0–1	0–2	0–8	
Year-end ranking	875	452	386	393	240			

== ATP Challenger Tour finals ==
=== Singles: 1 (runner-up) ===
Legend ATP Challenger (0–1)	Finals by surface Hard (0–1) Clay (–)

Result	W–L	Date	Tournament	Surface	Opponent	Score
Loss	0–1	Nov 2025	Trofeo Faip–Perrel, Italy	Hard (i)	(Italy) Francesco Maestrelli	3–6, 6–3, 1–6

== ITF World Tennis Tour finals ==
=== Singles: 7 (7 titles) ===
Legend ITF WTT (7–0)	Finals by surface Hard (1–0) Clay (6–0)

Result	W–L	Date	Tournament	Surface	Opponent	Score
Win	1–0	May 2023	M25 Kuršumlijska Banja, Serbia	Clay	(Morocco) Elliot Benchetrit	6–3, 6–4
Win	2–0	May 2023	M25 Kuršumlijska Banja, Serbia	Clay	(France) Mathys Erhard	6–2, 6–1
Win	3–0	Mar 2024	M25 Tarragona, Spain	Clay	(Peru) Ignacio Buse	6–3, 2–6, 6–2
Win	4–0	Oct 2024	M25 Heraklion, Greece	Clay	(Israel) Orel Kimhi	7–6^{(8–6)}, 7–6^{(7–4)}
Win	5–0	Mar 2025	M25 Faro, Portugal	Hard	(Portugal) Tiago Pereira	6–1, 3–6, 6–1
Win	6–0	May 2025	M25 Kuršumlijska Banja, Serbia	Clay	(Bosnia and Herzegovina) Andrej Nedić	6–1, 3–6, 6–3
Win	7–0	Sep 2026	M25 Zlatibor, Serbia	Clay	(Serbia) Kristijan Juhas	7–6^{(7–3)}, 7–5

=== Doubles: 2 (1 title, 1 runner-up) ===
Legend ITF WTT (1–1)	Finals by surface Hard (1–0) Clay (0–1)

Result	W–L	Date	Tournament	Surface	Partner	Opponents	Score
Win	1–0	Jan 2022	M25 Monastir, Tunisia	Hard	(Tunisia) Skander Mansouri	(France) Florent Bax (France) Robin Bertrand	6–4, 7–5
Loss	1–1	Sep 2023	M25 Maribor, Slovenia	Clay	(Bosnia and Herzegovina) Mirza Bašić	(Croatia) Nikola Bašić (Slovenia) Jan Kupčič	5–7, 6–4, [9–11]
