= 2017 ATP Lyon Open =

- Date: 21–27 May
- Edition: 1st
- Category: ATP World Tour 250
- Draw: 28S / 16D
- Prize money: €482,060
- Surface: Clay
- Location: Lyon, France

Champions

Singles
- (France) Jo-Wilfried Tsonga

Doubles
- (Argentina) Andrés Molteni / (Canada) Adil Shamasdin
ATP Lyon Open	· 2018 →

The 2017 Lyon Open (also known as the Open Parc Auvergne-Rhône-Alpes Lyon) was a men's tennis tournament that was played on outdoor clay courts. It was the 1st edition of the Lyon Open and part of the ATP World Tour 250 series of the 2017 ATP World Tour. It took place in the city of Lyon, France, from May 21 through May 27, 2017.

== Point distribution ==
Event	W	F	SF	QF	Round of 16	Round of 32	Q	Q2	Q3
Singles	250	150	90	45	20	0	12	6	0
Doubles	250	150	90	45	0	—	—	—	—

== Singles main draw entrants ==
=== Seeds ===
Country	Player	Rank^{1}	Seed
CAN	Milos Raonic	6	1
FRA	Jo-Wilfried Tsonga	12	2
CZE	Tomáš Berdych	13	3
AUS	Nick Kyrgios	18	4
FRA	Gilles Simon	31	5
ARG	Juan Martín del Potro	34	6
CRO	Borna Ćorić	41	7
FRA	Benoît Paire	44	8

- Rankings are as of May 15, 2017.

=== Other entrants ===
The following players received wildcards into the singles main draw:

- (Czech Republic) Tomáš Berdych
- (Argentina) Juan Martín del Potro
- (France) Gilles Simon

The following player received entry using a protected ranking:

- (Australia) Thanasi Kokkinakis

The following players received entry from the qualifying draw:

- (South Korea) Chung Hyeon
- (United Kingdom) Kyle Edmund
- (Portugal) Gastão Elias
- (Argentina) Nicolás Kicker

The following players received entry as lucky losers:

- (France) Quentin Halys
- (Argentina) Renzo Olivo
- (United States) Tennys Sandgren

=== Withdrawals ===
Before the tournament

- (Belgium) Steve Darcis →replaced by (United States) Tennys Sandgren
- (Spain) Marcel Granollers →replaced by (France) Quentin Halys
- (France) Nicolas Mahut →replaced by (Argentina) Renzo Olivo

== Doubles main draw entrants ==
=== Seeds ===
Country	Player	Country	Player	Rank^{1}	Seed
~~CRO~~	~~Ivan Dodig~~	~~ESP~~	~~Marcel Granollers~~	~~31~~	~~1~~
FRA	Fabrice Martin	CAN	Daniel Nestor	53	2
AUT	Oliver Marach	CRO	Mate Pavić	69	3
USA	Brian Baker	CRO	Nikola Mektić	74	4

- Rankings are as of May 15, 2017.

=== Other entrants ===
The following pairs received wildcards into the doubles main draw:

- (India) Jeevan Nedunchezhiyan / (Indonesia) Christopher Rungkat
- (France) Benoît Paire / (France) Thomas Paire

The following pair received entry as alternates:

- (Argentina) Carlos Berlocq / (Italy) Andreas Seppi

=== Withdrawals ===
Before the tournament

- (Spain) Marcel Granollers

== Finals ==
=== Singles ===
- (France) Jo-Wilfried Tsonga defeated (Czech Republic) Tomáš Berdych, 7–6^{(7–2)}, 7–5

=== Doubles ===
- (Argentina) Andrés Molteni / (Canada) Adil Shamasdin defeated (New Zealand) Marcus Daniell / (Brazil) Marcelo Demoliner, 6–3, 3–6, [10–5]
