= 2017 ATP Lyon Open – Doubles =

Doubles
- 2017 ATP Lyon Open

Final
- Champions: (Argentina) Andrés Molteni; (Canada) Adil Shamasdin
- Runners-up: (New Zealand) Marcus Daniell; (Brazil) Marcelo Demoliner
- Score: 6–3, 3–6, [10–5]

Events
Singles	Doubles
ATP Lyon Open	· 2018 →

The 2017 ATP Lyon Open (also known as the Open Parc Auvergne-Rhône-Alpes Lyon) was a men's tennis tournament that was played on outdoor clay courts. It was the 1st edition of the Lyon Open and part of the ATP World Tour 250 series of the 2017 ATP World Tour. It took place in the city of Lyon, France, from May 21 through May 27, 2017.

Andrés Molteni and Adil Shamasdin won the title, defeating Marcus Daniell and Marcelo Demoliner in the final, 6–3, 3–6, [10–5].

== Seeds ==
1. (Croatia) Ivan Dodig / (Spain) Marcel Granollers (withdrew)
2. (France) Fabrice Martin / (Canada) Daniel Nestor (first round)
3. (Austria) Oliver Marach / (Croatia) Mate Pavić (semifinals)
4. (United States) Brian Baker / (Croatia) Nikola Mektić (quarterfinals)

== Draw ==
=== Key ===
- Q = Qualifier
- WC = Wild card
- LL = Lucky loser
- Alt = Alternate
- SE = Special exempt
- PR = Protected ranking
- ITF = ITF entry
- JE = Junior exempt
- w/o = Walkover
- r = Retired
- d = Defaulted
- SR = Special ranking

=== Draw ===
First round

Quarterfinals

Semifinals

Final

Alt
- (Argentina) C Berlocq
- (Italy) A Seppi
6
3
[10]

- (Mexico) S González
- (United States) D Young
0
6
[4]

Alt
- (Argentina) C Berlocq
- (Italy) A Seppi
2
3

- (United States) N Monroe
- (New Zealand) A Sitak
6
4
[8]

- (Argentina) A Molteni
- (Canada) A Shamasdin
6
6

- (Argentina) A Molteni
- (Canada) A Shamasdin
4
6
[10]

- (Argentina) A Molteni
- (Canada) A Shamasdin
6
7^{7}

3
- (Austria) O Marach
- (Croatia) M Pavić
7^{8}
6

3
- (Austria) O Marach
- (Croatia) M Pavić
4
6^{1}

- (Israel) J Erlich
- (Brazil) A Sá
6^{6}
1

3
- (Austria) O Marach
- (Croatia) M Pavić
6
1
[13]

- (India) P Raja
- (India) D Sharan
6
2
[2]

WC
- (France) B Paire
- (France) T Paire
4
6
[11]

WC
- (France) B Paire
- (France) T Paire
3
6
[10]

- (Argentina) A Molteni
- (Canada) A Shamasdin
6
3
[10]

WC
- (India) J Nedunchezhiyan
- (Indonesia) C Rungkat
3
6
[5]

- (New Zealand) M Daniell
- (Brazil) M Demoliner
3
6
[5]

- (Australia) N Kyrgios
- (Australia) M Reid
6
3
[10]

- (Australia) N Kyrgios
- (Australia) M Reid
7^{7}
3
[11]

- (United States) J Cerretani
- (Czech Republic) R Jebavý
3
7^{7}
[11]

4
- (United States) B Baker
- (Croatia) N Mektić
6^{4}
6
[9]

4
- (United States) B Baker
- (Croatia) N Mektić
6
6^{5}
[13]

- (Australia) N Kyrgios
- (Australia) M Reid
3
1

- (Belarus) M Mirnyi
- (Russia) M Youzhny
1
5

- (New Zealand) M Daniell
- (Brazil) M Demoliner
6
6

- (Germany) A Begemann
- (Austria) P Oswald
6
7

- (Germany) A Begemann
- (Austria) P Oswald
6^{4}
7
[8]

- (New Zealand) M Daniell
- (Brazil) M Demoliner
7^{10}
7

- (New Zealand) M Daniell
- (Brazil) M Demoliner
7^{7}
5
[10]

2
- (France) F Martin
- (Canada) D Nestor
6^{8}
5
