= 2017 ATP Lyon Open – Singles =

Singles
- 2017 ATP Lyon Open

Final
- Champion: (France) Jo-Wilfried Tsonga
- Runner-up: (Czech Republic) Tomáš Berdych
- Score: 7–6^{(7–2)}, 7–5

Details
- Draw: 28 (4 Q / 3 WC )
- Seeds: 8

Events
Singles	Doubles
ATP Lyon Open	· 2018 →

The 2017 ATP Lyon Open (also known as the Open Parc Auvergne-Rhône-Alpes Lyon) was a men's tennis tournament that was played on outdoor clay courts. It was the 1st edition of the Lyon Open and part of the ATP World Tour 250 series of the 2017 ATP World Tour. It took place in the city of Lyon, France, from May 21 through May 27, 2017.

Jo-Wilfried Tsonga won the title, defeating Tomáš Berdych in the final, 7–6^{(7–2)}, 7–5.

== Seeds ==
The top four seeds receive a bye into the second round.

1. (Canada) Milos Raonic (semifinals)
2. (France) Jo-Wilfried Tsonga (champion)
3. (Czech Republic) Tomáš Berdych (final)
4. (Australia) Nick Kyrgios (second round)
5. (France) Gilles Simon (quarterfinals)
6. (Argentina) Juan Martín del Potro (second round)
7. (Croatia) Borna Ćorić (first round)
8. (France) Benoît Paire (first round)

== Draw ==
=== Key ===
- Q = Qualifier
- WC = Wild card
- LL = Lucky loser
- Alt = Alternate
- SE = Special exempt
- PR = Protected ranking
- ITF = ITF entry
- JE = Junior exempt
- w/o = Walkover
- r = Retired
- d = Defaulted
- SR = Special ranking

=== Finals ===
Semifinals
1	(Canada) Milos Raonic	6^{5}	6^{2}
3/WC	(Czech Republic) Tomáš Berdych	7^{7}	7^{7}
(Georgia (country)) Nikoloz Basilashvili	2	6	1
2	(France) Jo-Wilfried Tsonga	6	3	6

Final
3/WC	(Czech Republic) Tomáš Berdych	6^{2}	5
2	(France) Jo-Wilfried Tsonga	7^{7}	7

=== Top half ===
First round
PR	(Australia) T Kokkinakis	3	4
(Uzbekistan) D Istomin	6	6
Q	(Portugal) G Elias	2	6	6
(Moldova) R Albot	6	4	2
LL	(France) Q Halys	5	4
6/WC	(Argentina) JM del Potro	7	6
Q	(South Korea) H Chung	6	6
(United States) D Young	2	3
(Brazil) T Monteiro	6	4	1
Q	(United Kingdom) K Edmund	2	6	6
(Russia) D Medvedev	5	7^{7}	2
5/WC	(France) G Simon	7	6^{5}	6

Second round
1	(Canada) M Raonic	6	6
(Uzbekistan) D Istomin	4	3
Q	(Portugal) G Elias	7^{7}	6
6/WC	(Argentina) JM del Potro	6^{0}	4
3/WC	(Czech Republic) T Berdych	6	7
Q	(South Korea) H Chung	3	5
Q	(United Kingdom) K Edmund	6	5	4
5/WC	(France) G Simon	3	7	6

Quarterfinals
1	(Canada) M Raonic	6	6
Q	(Portugal) G Elias	4	3
3/WC	(Czech Republic) T Berdych	6	6
5/WC	(France) G Simon	4	0

Semifinals
1	(Canada) M Raonic	6^{5}	6^{2}
3/WC	(Czech Republic) T Berdych	7^{7}	7^{7}

=== Bottom half ===
First round
7	(Croatia) B Ćoric	4	7	4
(Georgia (country)) N Basilashvili	6	5	6
(Italy) A Seppi	7^{7}	6
(Bosnia and Herzegovina) D Džumhur	6^{5}	4
(Germany) D Brown	4	4
Q	(Argentina) N Kicker	6	6
8	(France) B Paire	7^{7}	6^{5}	4
(Australia) J Thompson	6^{3}	7^{7}	6
LL	(Argentina) R Olivo	2	4
(Russia) K Khachanov	6	6
(Argentina) C Berlocq	6	6
LL	(United States) T Sandgren	2	4

Second round
(Georgia (country)) N Basilashvili	6	6
(Italy) A Seppi	4	4
Q	(Argentina) N Kicker	2	6	6
4	(Australia) N Kyrgios	6	4	2
(Australia) J Thompson	2	6^{3}
(Russia) K Khachanov	6	7^{7}
(Argentina) C Berlocq	7^{7}	2	3
2	(France) J-W Tsonga	6^{2}	6	6

Quarterfinals
(Georgia (country)) N Basilashvili	6	6
Q	(Argentina) N Kicker	3	1
(Russia) K Khachanov	0	4
2	(France) J-W Tsonga	6	6

Semifinals
(Georgia (country)) N Basilashvili	2	6	1
2	(France) J-W Tsonga	6	3	6

== Qualifying ==
=== Seeds ===
1. (United Kingdom) Kyle Edmund (qualified)
2. (South Korea) Chung Hyeon (qualified)
3. (Argentina) Nicolás Kicker (qualified)
4. (Argentina) Renzo Olivo (qualifying competition, lucky loser)
5. (Portugal) Gastão Elias (qualified)
6. (United States) Tennys Sandgren (qualifying competition, lucky loser)
7. (France) Quentin Halys (qualifying competition, lucky loser)
8. (Canada) Peter Polansky (qualifying competition)

=== Qualifiers ===
1. (United Kingdom) Kyle Edmund
2. (South Korea) Chung Hyeon
3. (Argentina) Nicolás Kicker
4. (Portugal) Gastão Elias

=== Lucky losers ===
1. (Argentina) Renzo Olivo
2. (United States) Tennys Sandgren
3. (France) Quentin Halys

=== Qualifying draw ===
==== First qualifier ====
First round
1	(United Kingdom) Kyle Edmund	6	7
(Germany) Nils Langer	3	5
WC	(France) Alexandre Müller	0	4
6	(United States) Tennys Sandgren	6	6

Qualifying competition
1	(United Kingdom) Kyle Edmund	6	6
6	(United States) Tennys Sandgren	3	4

==== Second qualifier ====
First round
2	(South Korea) Chung Hyeon	6	6
(Austria) Michael Linzer	4	2
(Australia) Alex de Minaur	7^{7}	2	6^{8}
7	(France) Quentin Halys	6^{5}	6	7^{10}

Qualifying competition
2	(South Korea) Chung Hyeon	6	7
7	(France) Quentin Halys	4	5

==== Third qualifier ====
First round
3	(Argentina) Nicolás Kicker	6	6
(Bulgaria) Alexandar Lazov	3	4
Alt	(Argentina) Andrés Molteni	4	6	3
8	(Canada) Peter Polansky	6	3	6

Qualifying competition
3	(Argentina) Nicolás Kicker	7	6
8	(Canada) Peter Polansky	5	1

==== Fourth qualifier ====
First round
4	(Argentina) Renzo Olivo	5	6	6
(Bosnia and Herzegovina) Tomislav Brkić	7	2	4
WC	(France) Elliot Benchetrit	7^{7}	3	2
5	(Portugal) Gastão Elias	6^{4}	6	6

Qualifying competition
4	(Argentina) Renzo Olivo	6	3	1
5	(Portugal) Gastão Elias	1	6	6
