= 2019 ATP Lyon Open – Doubles =

Doubles
- 2019 ATP Lyon Open

Final
- Champions: (Croatia) Ivan Dodig (France) Édouard Roger-Vasselin
- Runners-up: (United Kingdom) Ken Skupski (United Kingdom) Neal Skupski
- Score: 6–4, 6–3

Details
- Draw: 16 (2 WC )
- Seeds: 4

Events
| Singles | Doubles |
| ← 2018 · | ATP Lyon Open | · 2021 → |

Nick Kyrgios and Jack Sock were the defending champions, but chose not to participate this year.

Ivan Dodig and Édouard Roger-Vasselin won the title, defeating Ken and Neal Skupski in the final, 6–4, 6–3.

== Seeds ==
1. (South Africa) Raven Klaasen / (New Zealand) Michael Venus (quarterfinals, withdrew)
2. (Croatia) Ivan Dodig / (France) Édouard Roger-Vasselin (champions)
3. (United Kingdom) Ken Skupski / (United Kingdom) Neal Skupski (final)
4. (United Kingdom) Luke Bambridge / (United Kingdom) Jonny O'Mara (semifinals)

== Draw ==
=== Key ===
- Q = Qualifier
- WC = Wild card
- LL = Lucky loser
- Alt = Alternate
- SE = Special exempt
- PR = Protected ranking
- ITF = ITF entry
- JE = Junior exempt
- w/o = Walkover
- r = Retired
- d = Defaulted
- SR = Special ranking

=== Draw ===
First round
1 | (South Africa) R Klaasen (New Zealand) M Venus | 7 | 6
WC | (France) A Hoang (France) G Jacq | 5 | 4
WC | (France) U Humbert (France) T Lamasine | 3 | 3
(India) L Paes (France) B Paire | 6 | 6
3 | (United Kingdom) K Skupski (United Kingdom) N Skupski | 6 | 2 | [10]
Alt | (Monaco) R Arneodo (Monaco) H Nys | 3 | 6 | [8]
(United States) M McDonald (United States) R Opelka | 4 | 4
(Netherlands) M Middelkoop (Germany) T Pütz | 6 | 6
Alt | (China) M Gong (South Africa) L Harris | 6 | 3 | [7]
(India) J Nedunchezhiyan (India) P Raja | 1 | 6 | [10]
(Kazakhstan) M Kukushkin (Belgium) J Vliegen | 4 | 6 | [6]
4 | (United Kingdom) L Bambridge (United Kingdom) J O'Mara | 6 | 3 | [10]
(Czech Republic) R Jebavý (Argentina) A Molteni | 6 | 5 | [10]
(Argentina) G Durán (Argentina) M González | 1 | 7 | [12]
(Poland) H Hurkacz (United States) S Johnson | 5 | 4
2 | (Croatia) I Dodig (France) É Roger-Vasselin | 7 | 6

Quarterfinals
1 | (South Africa) R Klaasen (New Zealand) M Venus
(India) L Paes (France) B Paire | w/o
3 | (United Kingdom) K Skupski (United Kingdom) N Skupski | 6 | 6^{4} | [10]
(Netherlands) M Middelkoop (Germany) T Pütz | 3 | 7^{7} | [7]
(India) J Nedunchezhiyan (India) P Raja | 4 | 1
4 | (United Kingdom) L Bambridge (United Kingdom) J O'Mara | 6 | 6
(Argentina) G Durán (Argentina) M González | 6^{3} | 4
2 | (Croatia) I Dodig (France) É Roger-Vasselin | 7^{7} | 6

Semifinals
(India) L Paes (France) B Paire | 3 | 6 | [8]
3 | (United Kingdom) K Skupski (United Kingdom) N Skupski | 6 | 3 | [10]
4 | (United Kingdom) L Bambridge (United Kingdom) J O'Mara | 1 | 2
2 | (Croatia) I Dodig (France) É Roger-Vasselin | 6 | 6

Final
3 | (United Kingdom) K Skupski (United Kingdom) N Skupski | 4 | 3
2 | (Croatia) I Dodig (France) É Roger-Vasselin | 6 | 6
