= 2019 ATP Lyon Open – Singles =

Singles
- 2019 ATP Lyon Open

Final
- Champion: (France) Benoît Paire
- Runner-up: (Canada) Félix Auger-Aliassime
- Score: 6–4, 6–3

Details
- Draw: 28 (4 Q / 3 WC )
- Seeds: 8

Events
| Singles | Doubles |
| ← 2018 · | ATP Lyon Open | · 2021 → |

Dominic Thiem was the defending champion, but he chose not to defend his title this year.

Benoît Paire won the title, defeating Félix Auger-Aliassime in the final, 6–4, 6–3.

== Seeds ==
The top four seeds receive a bye into the second round.

1. (Georgia (country)) Nikoloz Basilashvili (semifinals)
2. (Spain) Roberto Bautista Agut (quarterfinals)
3. (Canada) Denis Shapovalov (quarterfinals)
4. (Canada) Félix Auger-Aliassime (final)
5. (Serbia) Dušan Lajović (first round)
6. (France) Richard Gasquet (second round, withdrew)
7. (France) Pierre-Hugues Herbert (second round)
8. (Poland) Hubert Hurkacz (first round)

== Draw ==
=== Key ===
- Q = Qualifier
- WC = Wild card
- LL = Lucky loser
- Alt = Alternate
- SE = Special exempt
- PR = Protected ranking
- ITF = ITF entry
- JE = Junior exempt
- w/o = Walkover
- r = Retired
- d = Defaulted
- SR = Special ranking

=== Finals ===
Semifinals
1 | (Georgia (country)) Nikoloz Basilashvili | 6 | 6^{3} | 4
4 | (Canada) Félix Auger-Aliassime | 2 | 7^{7} | 6
(France) Benoît Paire | 6 | 6
(United States) Taylor Fritz | 4 | 2

Final
4 | (Canada) Félix Auger-Aliassime | 4 | 3
(France) Benoît Paire | 6 | 6

=== Top half ===
First round
LL | (France) T Lamasine | 6 | 7^{7}
Q | (Italy) J Sinner | 0 | 6^{5}
Q | (Canada) S Diez | 6 | 4
(Australia) B Tomic | 4 | 1^{r}
PR | (France) J-W Tsonga | 7^{7} | 6
5 | (Serbia) D Lajović | 6^{4} | 4
(Australia) J Millman | 6 | 6
(Spain) P Andújar | 1 | 3
(United States) S Johnson | 6 | 7^{7}
LL | (South Africa) L Harris | 2 | 6^{2}
(France) J Chardy | 2 | 5
7 | (France) P-H Herbert | 6 | 7

Second round
1 | (Georgia (country)) N Basilashvili | 7 | 7
LL | (France) T Lamasine | 5 | 5
Q | (Canada) S Diez | 6 | 6^{2} | 3
PR | (France) J-W Tsonga | 3 | 7^{7} | 6
4 | (Canada) F Auger-Aliassime | 7^{7} | 7
(Australia) J Millman | 6^{3} | 5
(United States) S Johnson | 7^{8} | 5 | 6
7 | (France) P-H Herbert | 6^{6} | 7 | 1

Quarterfinals
1 | (Georgia (country)) N Basilashvili | 6 | 6
PR | (France) J-W Tsonga | 4 | 4
4 | (Canada) F Auger-Aliassime | 6 | 2 | 6
(United States) S Johnson | 4 | 6 | 4

Semifinals
1 | (Georgia (country)) N Basilashvili | 6 | 6^{3} | 4
4 | (Canada) F Auger-Aliassime | 2 | 7^{7} | 6

=== Bottom half ===
First round
8 | (Poland) H Hurkacz | 4 | 4
(Uruguay) P Cuevas | 6 | 6
(France) B Paire | 3 | 7^{7} | 6
(United States) M McDonald | 6 | 6^{5} | 1
(France) U Humbert | 6 | 6
(United Kingdom) C Norrie | 1 | 3
6/WC | (France) R Gasquet | 6^{5} | 6 | 7^{7}
Q | (France) M Janvier | 7^{7} | 2 | 6^{2}
(United States) T Fritz | 7 | 7^{7}
Q | (Czech Republic) J Veselý | 5 | 6^{3}
WC | (France) C Moutet | 6 | 2 | 7^{12}
(United States) R Opelka | 3 | 6 | 6^{10}

Second round
(Uruguay) P Cuevas | 4 | 3
(France) B Paire | 6 | 6
(France) U Humbert | 6 | 6^{3} | 2
3/WC | (Canada) D Shapovalov | 2 | 7^{7} | 6
6/WC | (France) R Gasquet
(United States) T Fritz | w/o
WC | (France) C Moutet | 6 | 4 | 3
2 | (Spain) R Bautista Agut | 4 | 6 | 6

Quarterfinals
(France) B Paire | 6 | 4 | 7^{7}
3/WC | (Canada) D Shapovalov | 3 | 6 | 6^{4}
(United States) T Fritz | 6^{6} | 6 | 6
2 | (Spain) R Bautista Agut | 7^{8} | 3 | 4

Semifinals
(France) B Paire | 6 | 6
(United States) T Fritz | 4 | 2

== Qualifying ==
=== Seeds ===
1. (South Africa) Lloyd Harris (qualifying competition, Lucky loser)
2. (Kazakhstan) Alexander Bublik (first round)
3. (Czech Republic) Jiří Veselý (qualified)
4. (Australia) Alexei Popyrin (first round)
5. (France) Grégoire Barrère (qualifying competition)
6. (France) Antoine Hoang (first round)
7. (France) Quentin Halys (qualifying competition)
8. (France) Maxime Janvier (qualified)

=== Qualifiers ===
1. (France) Maxime Janvier
2. (Italy) Jannik Sinner
3. (Czech Republic) Jiří Veselý
4. (Canada) Steven Diez

=== Lucky losers ===
1. (South Africa) Lloyd Harris
2. (France) Tristan Lamasine

=== Qualifying draw ===
==== First qualifier ====
First round
1 | (South Africa) Lloyd Harris | 3 | 6 | 6
(France) Kenny de Schepper | 6 | 3 | 2
(Brazil) Guilherme Clezar | 5 | 6 | 4
8 | (France) Maxime Janvier | 7 | 4 | 6

Qualifying competition
1 | (South Africa) Lloyd Harris | 1 | 4
8 | (France) Maxime Janvier | 6 | 6

==== Second qualifier ====
First round
2 | (Kazakhstan) Alexander Bublik | 2 | 6 | 5
(France) Tristan Lamasine | 6 | 2 | 7
WC | (Italy) Jannik Sinner | 6 | 5 | 6
6 | (France) Antoine Hoang | 4 | 7 | 1

Qualifying competition
(France) Tristan Lamasine | 4 | 3
WC | (Italy) Jannik Sinner | 6 | 6

==== Third qualifier ====
First round
3 | (Czech Republic) Jiří Veselý | 6 | 6
(Spain) Nicola Kuhn | 4 | 4
WC | (France) Hugo Grenier | 7^{7} | 4 | 6^{5}
5 | (France) Grégoire Barrère | 6^{3} | 6 | 7^{7}

Qualifying competition
3 | (Czech Republic) Jiří Veselý | 3 | 6 | 6
5 | (France) Grégoire Barrère | 6 | 3 | 2

==== Fourth qualifier ====
First round
4 | (Australia) Alexei Popyrin | 4 | 6 | 5
(Canada) Steven Diez | 6 | 3 | 7
(Spain) Mario Vilella Martínez | 6^{2} | 2
7 | (France) Quentin Halys | 7^{7} | 6

Qualifying competition
(Canada) Steven Diez | 6 | 3 | 6
7 | (France) Quentin Halys | 2 | 6 | 3
