= 2026 Grand Prix Auvergne-Rhône-Alpes – Doubles =

Doubles
- 2026 Grand Prix Auvergne-Rhône-Alpes

Final
- Champions: (United Kingdom) Julian Cash (United Kingdom) Lloyd Glasspool
- Runners-up: (France) Théo Arribagé (France) Albano Olivetti
- Score: 4–6, 6–3, [10–8]
- Date: 25 October 2026

Events
Singles	Doubles
- ATP Lyon Open

Julian Cash and Lloyd Glasspool defeated Théo Arribagé and Albano Olivetti in the final, 4–6, 6–3, [10–8] to win the doubles tennis title at the 2026 ATP Lyon Open.

Harri Heliövaara and Henry Patten were the reigning champions from 2024, but did not participate this year.

== Seeds ==
1. (United Kingdom) Julian Cash / (United Kingdom) Lloyd Glasspool (champions)
2. (France) Théo Arribagé / (France) Albano Olivetti (final)
3. (Monaco) Hugo Nys / (France) Édouard Roger-Vasselin (first round)
4. (United States) Robert Cash / (Austria) Alexander Erler (first round)

== Draw ==
Key

- Q = Qualifier
- WC = Wild card
- LL = Lucky loser
- Alt = Alternate
- ITF = ITF entry
- PR = Protected ranking
- SR = Special ranking
- SE = Special exempt
- JE = Junior exempt
- JR = Junior Accelerator Programme entrant
- CO = College Accelerator Programme entrant
- NG = Next Gen Accelerator Program entrant
- w/o = Walkover
- r = Retired
- d = Defaulted

=== Draw ===
First round
1	(United Kingdom) J Cash (United Kingdom) L Glasspool	7^{8}	6
(Mexico) MÁ Reyes-Varela (United States) R Stalder	6^{6}	4
(United Kingdom) D Stevenson (United Kingdom) M Willis	4	2
(Czech Republic) A Paulson (Croatia) N Serdarušić	6	6
3	(Monaco) H Nys (France) É Roger-Vasselin	6	6^{9}	[5]
(New Zealand) F Reynolds (New Zealand) J Watt	3	7^{11}	[10]
(United States) T Hilderbrand (Serbia) S Latinović	4	6	[2]
(Uruguay) A Behar (United Kingdom) J Paris	6	3	[10]
(Monaco) R Arneodo (France) U Blanchet	7^{7}	1	[10]
(Ecuador) G Escobar (India) N Kaliyanda Poonacha	6^{2}	6	[8]
WC	(France) M Bobichon (Switzerland) K Feldbausch	7^{9}	6
4	(United States) R Cash (Austria) A Erler	6^{7}	2
(Switzerland) J Paul (Czech Republic) M Vocel	6^{2}	6	[10]
(Mexico) S González (Germany) H Jebens	7^{7}	3	[12]
(France) T Droguet (France) K Jacquet	4	6^{3}
2	(France) T Arribagé (France) A Olivetti	6	7^{7}

Quarterfinals
1	(United Kingdom) J Cash (United Kingdom) L Glasspool	6	6
(Czech Republic) A Paulson (Croatia) N Serdarušić	3	4
(New Zealand) F Reynolds (New Zealand) J Watt	6^{8}	6	[4]
(Uruguay) A Behar (United Kingdom) J Paris	7^{10}	4	[10]
(Monaco) R Arneodo (France) U Blanchet	6^{3}	2
WC	(France) M Bobichon (Switzerland) K Feldbausch	7^{7}	6
(Mexico) S González (Germany) H Jebens	2	4
2	(France) T Arribagé (France) A Olivetti	6	6

Semifinals
1	(United Kingdom) J Cash (United Kingdom) L Glasspool	7^{7}	7^{7}
(Uruguay) A Behar (United Kingdom) J Paris	6^{5}	6^{2}
WC	(France) M Bobichon (Switzerland) K Feldbausch	2	5
2	(France) T Arribagé (France) A Olivetti	6	7

Final
1	(United Kingdom) J Cash (United Kingdom) L Glasspool	4	6	[10]
2	(France) T Arribagé (France) A Olivetti	6	3	[8]
