= 2019 ATP Lyon Open =

- Date: 19 – 25 May
- Edition: 3rd
- Category: ATP Tour 250
- Draw: 28S / 16D
- Prize money: €524,340
- Surface: Clay / outdoor
- Location: Lyon, France

Champions

Singles
- (France) Benoît Paire

Doubles
- (Croatia) Ivan Dodig / (France) Édouard Roger-Vasselin
← 2018 ·	ATP Lyon Open	· 2021 →

The 2019 Lyon Open (also known as the Open Parc Auvergne-Rhône-Alpes Lyon) was a men's tennis tournament played on outdoor clay courts. It was the third edition of the Lyon Open and part of the ATP Tour 250 series of the 2019 ATP Tour. It took place in the city of Lyon, France, from 19 May through 25 May 2019. Unseeded Benoît Paire won the singles title.

== Finals ==
=== Singles ===
- (France) Benoît Paire defeated (Canada) Félix Auger-Aliassime, 6–4, 6–3

=== Doubles ===
- (Croatia) Ivan Dodig / (France) Édouard Roger-Vasselin defeated (United Kingdom) Ken Skupski / (United Kingdom) Neal Skupski, 6–4, 6–3

== Singles main draw entrants ==
=== Seeds ===
Country	Player	Rank^{1}	Seed
GEO	Nikoloz Basilashvili	18	1
ESP	Roberto Bautista Agut	20	2
CAN	Denis Shapovalov	22	3
CAN	Félix Auger-Aliassime	30	4
SRB	Dušan Lajović	31	5
FRA	Richard Gasquet	39	6
FRA	Pierre-Hugues Herbert	40	7
POL	Hubert Hurkacz	41	8

- Rankings are as of May 13, 2019.

=== Other entrants ===
The following players received wildcards into the singles main draw:

- (France) Richard Gasquet
- (France) Corentin Moutet
- (Canada) Denis Shapovalov

The following player received entry using a protected ranking into the singles main draw:

- (France) Jo-Wilfried Tsonga

The following players received entry from the qualifying draw:

- (Canada) Steven Diez
- (France) Maxime Janvier
- (Italy) Jannik Sinner
- (Czech Republic) Jiří Veselý

The following players received entry as lucky losers:

- (South Africa) Lloyd Harris
- (France) Tristan Lamasine

=== Withdrawals ===
Before the tournament

- (Czech Republic) Tomáš Berdych → replaced by (France) Benoît Paire
- (United States) John Isner → replaced by (Spain) Pablo Andújar
- (Slovakia) Martin Kližan → replaced by (South Africa) Lloyd Harris
- (Kazakhstan) Mikhail Kukushkin → replaced by (France) Tristan Lamasine
- (Germany) Jan-Lennard Struff → replaced by (France) Ugo Humbert

During the tournament

(France) Richard Gasquet

=== Retirements ===
- (Australia) Bernard Tomic

== Doubles main draw entrants ==
=== Seeds ===
Country	Player	Country	Player	Rank^{1}	Seed
RSA	Raven Klaasen	NZL	Michael Venus	31	1
CRO	Ivan Dodig	FRA	Édouard Roger-Vasselin	60	2
GBR	Ken Skupski	GBR	Neal Skupski	80	3
GBR	Luke Bambridge	GBR	Jonny O'Mara	90	4

- Rankings are as of May 13, 2019.

=== Other entrants ===
The following pairs received wildcards into the doubles main draw:

- (France) Antoine Hoang / (France) Grégoire Jacq
- (France) Ugo Humbert / (France) Tristan Lamasine

The following pairs received entry as alternates:

- (Monaco) Romain Arneodo / (Monaco) Hugo Nys
- (China) Gong Maoxin / (South Africa) Lloyd Harris

=== Withdrawals ===
Before the tournament

- (Slovakia) Martin Kližan
- (United Kingdom) Cameron Norrie

During the tournament

- (New Zealand) Michael Venus
