= 2023 ATP Lyon Open =

Tennis competition

- Date: 21–27 May
- Edition: 6th
- Category: ATP Tour 250
- Draw: 28S/16Q/16D
- Prize money: €562,815
- Surface: Clay / outdoor
- Location: Lyon, France
- Venue: Vélodrome Georges Préveral, Parc de la Tête d'or

Champions

Singles
- (France) Arthur Fils

Doubles
- (United States) Rajeev Ram / (United Kingdom) Joe Salisbury
- ATP Lyon Open

The 2023 ATP Lyon Open (also known as the Open Parc Auvergne-Rhône-Alpes Lyon) was a men's tennis tournament played on outdoor clay courts. It was the 6th edition of the Lyon Open and part of the ATP Tour 250 series of the 2023 ATP Tour. It took place in the city of Lyon, France, from 21 to 27 May 2023.

== Champions ==
=== Singles ===
- (France) Arthur Fils def. (Argentina) Francisco Cerúndolo, 6–3, 7–5

=== Doubles ===
- (United States) Rajeev Ram / (United Kingdom) Joe Salisbury def. (France) Nicolas Mahut / (Netherlands) Matwé Middelkoop, 6–0, 6–3

== Points and prize money ==
=== Point distribution ===
Event	W	F	SF	QF	Round of 16	Round of 32	Q	Q2	Q1
Singles	250	150	90	45	20	0	12	6	0
Doubles	250	150	90	45	0	—N/a	—N/a	—N/a	—N/a

=== Prize money ===
Event	W	F	SF	QF	Round of 16	Round of 32	Q2	Q1
Singles	€85,605	€49,940	€29,355	€17,010	€9,880	€6,035	€3,020	€1,645
Doubles*	€29,740	€15,910	€9,330	€5,220	€3,070	—N/a	—N/a	—N/a

_{*per team}

== Singles main draw entrants ==
=== Seeds ===
Country	Player	Rank^{1}	Seed
CAN	Félix Auger-Aliassime	10	1
GBR	Cameron Norrie	13	2
USA	Tommy Paul	17	3
ARG	Francisco Cerúndolo	31	4
SRB	Miomir Kecmanović	37	5
ARG	Sebastián Báez	40	6
FRA	Richard Gasquet	44	7
USA	Brandon Nakashima	47	8

- Rankings are as of 8 May 2023.

=== Other entrants ===
The following players received wildcards into the singles main draw:

- (Canada) Félix Auger-Aliassime
- (France) Arthur Fils
- (France) Gaël Monfils

The following players received entry from the qualifying draw:

- (South Africa) Lloyd Harris
- (Spain) Pablo Llamas Ruiz
- (Spain) Álvaro López San Martín
- (China) Zhang Zhizhen

The following player received entry as a lucky loser:

- (Spain) Oriol Roca Batalla

=== Withdrawals ===
- (Spain) Pablo Carreño Busta → replaced by (France) Alexandre Müller
- (Argentina) Tomás Martín Etcheverry → replaced by (Spain) Oriol Roca Batalla
- (France) Quentin Halys → replaced by (Belgium) David Goffin
- (Australia) Jason Kubler → replaced by (France) Arthur Rinderknech
- (Slovakia) Alex Molčan → replaced by (Peru) Juan Pablo Varillas
- (Japan) Yoshihito Nishioka → replaced by (Argentina) Diego Schwartzman

== Doubles main draw entrants ==
=== Seeds ===
Country	Player	Country	Player	Rank^{1}	Seed
USA	Rajeev Ram	GBR	Joe Salisbury	9	1
ARG	Máximo González	ARG	Andrés Molteni	47	2
FRA	Nicolas Mahut	NED	Matwé Middelkoop	58	3
BEL	Sander Gillé	BEL	Joran Vliegen	83	4

- Rankings are as of 8 May 2023.

=== Other entrants ===
The following pairs received wildcards into the doubles main draw:

- (France) Ugo Blanchet / (France) Manuel Guinard
- ~~(France) Mayeul Darras / (France) Kyrian Jacquet~~

The following pair received entry as alternates:

- (Argentina) Guido Andreozzi / (Argentina) Guillermo Durán

=== Withdrawals ===
- (France) Mayeul Darras / (France) Kyrian Jacquet → replaced by (Argentina) Guido Andreozzi / (Argentina) Guillermo Durán
- (Croatia) Ivan Dodig / (United States) Austin Krajicek → replaced by (Ecuador) Gonzalo Escobar / (Kazakhstan) Andrey Golubev
- (United Kingdom) Lloyd Glasspool / (Finland) Harri Heliövaara → replaced by (Sweden) André Göransson / (Japan) Ben McLachlan
- (Mexico) Santiago González / (Mexico) Miguel Ángel Reyes-Varela → replaced by (Kazakhstan) Aleksandr Nedovyesov / (Mexico) Miguel Ángel Reyes-Varela
- (Germany) Kevin Krawietz / (Germany) Tim Pütz → replaced by (Colombia) Nicolás Barrientos / (France) Albano Olivetti
- (Australia) Jason Kubler / (Australia) Max Purcell → replaced by (India) Yuki Bhambri / (India) Saketh Myneni
