= 2018 ATP Lyon Open =

- Date: 20–26 May
- Edition: 2nd
- Category: ATP World Tour 250
- Draw: 28S / 16D
- Prize money: €501,345
- Surface: Clay / outdoor
- Location: Lyon, France

Champions

Singles
- (Austria) Dominic Thiem

Doubles
- (Australia) Nick Kyrgios / (United States) Jack Sock
← 2017 ·	ATP Lyon Open	· 2019 →

The 2018 Lyon Open (also known as the Open Parc Auvergne-Rhône-Alpes Lyon) was a men's tennis tournament played on outdoor clay courts. It was the second edition of the Lyon Open and part of the ATP World Tour 250 series of the 2018 ATP World Tour. It took place in the city of Lyon, France, from May 20 through May 26, 2018.

== Singles main draw entrants ==
=== Seeds ===
Country	Player	Rank^{1}	Seed
AUT	Dominic Thiem	8	1
USA	John Isner	10	2
USA	Jack Sock	15	3
KOR	~~Chung Hyeon~~	~~20~~	~~4~~
FRA	Adrian Mannarino	27	5
FRA	Gaël Monfils	38	6
POR	João Sousa	48	7
AUS	~~John Millman~~	~~58~~	~~8~~

- Rankings are as of May 14, 2018.

=== Other entrants ===
The following players received wildcards into the singles main draw:

- (France) Grégoire Barrère
- (France) Adrian Mannarino
- (France) Corentin Moutet

The following players received entry from the qualifying draw:

- (Serbia) Laslo Đere
- (Dominican Republic) José Hernández-Fernández
- (Slovakia) Filip Horanský
- (Spain) Jordi Samper-Montaña

The following players received entry as lucky losers:

- (Argentina) Federico Coria
- (Belgium) Joris De Loore

=== Withdrawals ===
Before the tournament

- (South Korea) Chung Hyeon → replaced by (Belgium) Joris De Loore
- (Russia) Karen Khachanov → replaced by (United Kingdom) Cameron Norrie
- (Argentina) Leonardo Mayer → replaced by (Kazakhstan) Mikhail Kukushkin
- (Russia) Daniil Medvedev → replaced by (Serbia) Dušan Lajović
- (Serbia) Viktor Troicki → replaced by (France) Calvin Hemery
- (France) Jo-Wilfried Tsonga → replaced by (Argentina) Federico Coria

== Doubles main draw entrants ==
=== Seeds ===
Country	Player	Country	Player	Rank^{1}	Seed
PAK	Aisam-ul-Haq Qureshi	NED	Jean-Julien Rojer	42	1
IND	Rohan Bopanna	FRA	Édouard Roger-Vasselin	50	2
CHI	Julio Peralta	ARG	Horacio Zeballos	69	3
POL	Marcin Matkowski	JPN	Ben McLachlan	70	4

- Rankings are as of May 14, 2018.

=== Other entrants ===
The following pairs received wildcards into the doubles main draw:

- (France) Grégoire Barrère / (France) Tristan Lamasine
- (France) Jonathan Eysseric / (France) Hugo Nys

== Finals ==
=== Singles ===
- (Austria) Dominic Thiem defeated (France) Gilles Simon, 3–6, 7–6^{(7–2)}, 6–1

=== Doubles ===
- (Australia) Nick Kyrgios / (United States) Jack Sock defeated (Czech Republic) Roman Jebavý / (Netherlands) Matwé Middelkoop, 7–5, 2–6, [11–9]
