= 2018 Grand Prix Hassan II =

- Date: 9–15 April
- Edition: 34th
- Draw: 32S / 16D
- Prize money: €501,345
- Surface: Clay / outdoor
- Location: Marrakesh, Morocco

Champions

Singles
- (Spain) Pablo Andújar

Doubles
- (Croatia) Nikola Mektić / (Austria) Alexander Peya
- Grand Prix Hassan II

The 2018 Grand Prix Hassan II was a professional tennis tournament played on clay courts. It was the 34th edition of the tournament and part of the 2018 ATP World Tour. It took place in Marrakesh, Morocco between 9 and 15 April 2018.

== Singles main-draw entrants ==
=== Seeds ===
Country	Player	Rank^{1}	Seed
ESP	Albert Ramos Viñolas	23	1
GBR	Kyle Edmund	26	2
GER	Philipp Kohlschreiber	34	3
FRA	Richard Gasquet	38	4
NED	Robin Haase	44	5
FRA	Benoît Paire	47	6
UKR	Alexandr Dolgopolov	53	7
GER	Mischa Zverev	55	8

- ^{1} Rankings are as of April 2, 2018.

=== Other entrants ===
The following players received wildcards into the singles main draw:

- (Morocco) Amine Ahouda
- (Tunisia) Malek Jaziri
- (Morocco) Lamine Ouahab

The following players received entry using a protected ranking:

- (Spain) Pablo Andújar

The following players received entry from the qualifying draw:

- (Italy) Andrea Arnaboldi
- (France) Calvin Hemery
- (Spain) Pedro Martínez
- (Russia) Alexey Vatutin

The following player received entry as a lucky loser:

- (Belarus) Ilya Ivashka

=== Withdrawals ===
Before the tournament

- (Croatia) Borna Ćorić → replaced by (Spain) Pablo Andújar
- (Argentina) Federico Delbonis → replaced by (Moldova) Radu Albot
- (Bosnia and Herzegovina) Damir Džumhur → replaced by (Georgia (country)) Nikoloz Basilashvili
- (Serbia) Filip Krajinović → replaced by (Spain) Roberto Carballés Baena
- (France) Gaël Monfils → replaced by (Italy) Matteo Berrettini
- (Serbia) Viktor Troicki → replaced by (Belarus) Ilya Ivashka

=== Retirements ===
- (Czech Republic) Jiří Veselý

== Doubles main-draw entrants ==
=== Seeds ===
Country	Player	Country	Player	Rank^{1}	Seed
CRO	Nikola Mektić	AUT	Alexander Peya	69	1
ESP	Marc López	SRB	Nenad Zimonjić	86	2
NZL	Marcus Daniell	GBR	Dominic Inglot	87	3
NED	Robin Haase	NED	Matwé Middelkoop	90	4

- Rankings are as of April 2, 2018.

=== Other entrants ===
The following pairs received wildcards into the doubles main draw:

- (Morocco) Amine Ahouda / (Morocco) Yassine Idmbarek
- (Tunisia) Malek Jaziri / (Morocco) Lamine Ouahab

== Finals ==
=== Singles ===
- (Spain) Pablo Andújar defeated (United Kingdom) Kyle Edmund, 6–2, 6–2

=== Doubles ===
- (Croatia) Nikola Mektić / (Austria) Alexander Peya defeated (France) Benoît Paire / (France) Édouard Roger-Vasselin, 7–5, 3–6, [10–7]
