= 2018 Grand Prix Hassan II – Singles =

Singles
- 2018 Grand Prix Hassan II

Final
- Champion: (Spain) Pablo Andújar
- Runner-up: (United Kingdom) Kyle Edmund
- Score: 6–2, 6–2

Details
- Draw: 32 (4 Q / 3 WC )
- Seeds: 8

Events
Singles	Doubles
- Grand Prix Hassan II

Borna Ćorić was the defending champion, but withdrew before the tournament began.

Pablo Andújar won the title, defeating Kyle Edmund in the final, 6–2, 6–2. Ranked number 355, Andújar became the lowest ranked player to win the ATP title since Lleyton Hewitt at the 1998 Adelaide International.

== Seeds ==
1. (Spain) Albert Ramos Viñolas (second round)
2. (United Kingdom) Kyle Edmund (final)
3. (Germany) Philipp Kohlschreiber (first round)
4. (France) Richard Gasquet (semifinals)
5. (Netherlands) Robin Haase (first round)
6. (France) Benoît Paire (first round)
7. (Ukraine) Alexandr Dolgopolov (first round)
8. (Germany) Mischa Zverev (second round)

== Draw ==
Key

- Q = Qualifier
- WC = Wild card
- LL = Lucky loser
- Alt = Alternate
- ITF = ITF entry
- PR = Protected ranking
- SR = Special ranking
- SE = Special exempt
- JE = Junior exempt
- JR = Junior Accelerator Programme entrant
- CO = College Accelerator Programme entrant
- NG = Next Gen Accelerator Program entrant
- w/o = Walkover
- r = Retired
- d = Defaulted

=== Finals ===
Semifinals
PR	(Spain) Pablo Andújar	6	6
(Portugal) João Sousa	4	4
4	(France) Richard Gasquet	3	4
2	(United Kingdom) Kyle Edmund	6	6

Final
PR	(Spain) Pablo Andújar	6	6
2	(United Kingdom) Kyle Edmund	2	2

=== Top half ===
First round
1	(Spain) A Ramos Viñolas	6	6
WC	(Morocco) A Ahouda	1	2
Q	(Russia) A Vatutin	3	6	6
(Germany) J-L Struff	6	3	2
LL	(Belarus) I Ivashka	3	5
PR	(Spain) P Andújar	6	7
Q	(Italy) A Arnaboldi	6	6
7	(Ukraine) A Dolgopolov	2	3
3	(Germany) P Kohlschreiber	6	0	6^{3}
WC	(Morocco) L Ouahab	2	6	7^{7}
(Georgia (country)) N Basilashvili	7^{7}	6
(Italy) M Berrettini	6^{2}	4
(Portugal) J Sousa	7	7
Q	(Spain) P Martínez	5	5
(Bosnia and Herzegovina) M Bašić	4	6	7
5	(Netherlands) R Haase	6	4	5

Second round
1	(Spain) A Ramos Viñolas	6^{4}	2
Q	(Russia) A Vatutin	7^{7}	6
PR	(Spain) P Andújar	6	6
Q	(Italy) A Arnaboldi	0	2
WC	(Morocco) L Ouahab	6^{5}	7	3
(Georgia (country)) N Basilashvili	7^{7}	5	6
(Portugal) J Sousa	6	3	6
(Bosnia and Herzegovina) M Bašić	3	6	4

Quarterfinals
Q	(Russia) A Vatutin	4	7	3
PR	(Spain) P Andújar	6	5	6
(Georgia (country)) N Basilashvili	2	6	1
(Portugal) J Sousa	6	4	6

Semifinals
PR	(Spain) P Andújar	6	6
(Portugal) J Sousa	4	4

=== Bottom half ===
First round
6	(France) B Paire	2	7^{7}	6^{5}
(France) G Simon	6	6^{1}	7^{7}
(Germany) M Marterer	3	1
(Spain) R Carballés Baena	6	6
Q	(France) C Hemery	2	2
(Spain) G García López	6	6
(Italy) T Fabbiano	1	6^{2}
4	(France) R Gasquet	6	7^{7}
8	(Germany) M Zverev	6	6
(Italy) P Lorenzi	3	4
WC	(Tunisia) M Jaziri	1	6	6
(Hungary) M Fucsovics	6	4	2
(Moldova) R Albot	1	6	6
(Italy) A Seppi	6	3	0
(Czech Republic) J Veselý	0^{r}
2	(United Kingdom) K Edmund	5

Second round
(France) G Simon	7	6
(Spain) R Carballés Baena	5	1
(Spain) G García López	2	4
4	(France) R Gasquet	6	6
8	(Germany) M Zverev	2	4
WC	(Tunisia) M Jaziri	6	6
(Moldova) R Albot	2	4
2	(United Kingdom) K Edmund	6	6

Quarterfinals
(France) G Simon	2	6^{4}
4	(France) R Gasquet	6	7^{7}
WC	(Tunisia) M Jaziri	2	1
2	(United Kingdom) K Edmund	6	6

Semifinals
4	(France) R Gasquet	3	4
2	(United Kingdom) K Edmund	6	6

== Qualifying ==
=== Seeds ===
1. (Belarus) Ilya Ivashka (qualifying competition, lucky loser)
2. (Australia) Alex de Minaur (qualifying competition)
3. (France) Calvin Hemery (qualified)
4. (France) Corentin Moutet (first round)
5. (Russia) Alexey Vatutin (qualified)
6. (Spain) Tommy Robredo (qualifying competition)
7. (Italy) Salvatore Caruso (first round)
8. (Latvia) Ernests Gulbis (first round)

=== Qualifiers ===
1. (Spain) Pedro Martínez
2. (Russia) Alexey Vatutin
3. (France) Calvin Hemery
4. (Italy) Andrea Arnaboldi

=== Lucky loser ===
1. (Belarus) Ilya Ivashka

=== Qualifying draw ===
==== First qualifier ====
First round
1	(Belarus) Ilya Ivashka	6	6
WC	(Morocco) Ismail Saadi	1	0
(Spain) Pedro Martínez	6	1	6
8	(Latvia) Ernests Gulbis	2	6	3

Qualifying competition
1	(Belarus) Ilya Ivashka	5	5
(Spain) Pedro Martínez	7	7

==== Second qualifier ====
First round
2	(Australia) Alex de Minaur	6^{2}	7	3
WC	(France) Geoffrey Blancaneaux	7^{7}	5	0^{r}
(Spain) Enrique López Pérez	3	2
5	(Russia) Alexey Vatutin	6	6

Qualifying competition
2	(Australia) Alex de Minaur	4	6	4
5	(Russia) Alexey Vatutin	6	4	6

==== Third qualifier ====
First round
3	(France) Calvin Hemery	6	6
(Belarus) Egor Gerasimov	4	2
(France) Vincent Millot	0	2
6	(Spain) Tommy Robredo	6	6

Qualifying competition
3	(France) Calvin Hemery	6	4	6
6	(Spain) Tommy Robredo	2	6	2

==== Fourth qualifier ====
First round
4	(France) Corentin Moutet	3	5
(United States) Noah Rubin	6	7
(Italy) Andrea Arnaboldi	4	7	6
7	(Italy) Salvatore Caruso	6	5	1

Qualifying competition
(United States) Noah Rubin	3	6	3
(Italy) Andrea Arnaboldi	6	3	6
