= 2026 Grand Prix Auvergne-Rhône-Alpes – Singles =

Singles
- 2026 Grand Prix Auvergne-Rhône-Alpes

Final
- Champion: (Italy) Lorenzo Musetti
- Runner-up: (United States) Taylor Fritz
- Score: 6–3, 6–4
- Date: 25 October 2026

Details
- Draw: 28 (4 Q / 3 WC )
- Seeds: 8

Events
Singles	Doubles
- ATP Lyon Open

Match point of semi-final between Taylor Fritz and Tommy Paul.

Lorenzo Musetti defeated Taylor Fritz in the final, 6–3, 6–4 to win the singles tennis title at the 2026 ATP Lyon Open. He saved four match points (in the semifinals against Flavio Cobolli) en route to his third career ATP Tour title, and first since 2022.

Giovanni Mpetshi Perricard was the reigning champion from 2024, but chose to play qualifying in Brussels instead.

== Seeds ==
The top four seeds received a bye into the second round.

1. (Italy) Flavio Cobolli (semifinals)
2. (United States) Taylor Fritz (final)
3. (Monaco) Valentin Vacherot (second round)
4. (United States) Tommy Paul (semifinals)
5. (United States) Brandon Nakashima (quarterfinals)
6. (Italy) Lorenzo Musetti (champion)
7. (France) Ugo Humbert (first round)
8. (United Kingdom) Arthur Fery (first round)

== Draw ==
Key

- Q = Qualifier
- WC = Wild card
- LL = Lucky loser
- Alt = Alternate
- ITF = ITF entry
- PR = Protected ranking
- SR = Special ranking
- SE = Special exempt
- JE = Junior exempt
- JR = Junior Accelerator Programme entrant
- CO = College Accelerator Programme entrant
- NG = Next Gen Accelerator Program entrant
- w/o = Walkover
- r = Retired
- d = Defaulted

=== Finals ===
Semifinals
1	(Italy) Flavio Cobolli	6	2	5
6	(Italy) Lorenzo Musetti	4	6	7
4	(United States) Tommy Paul	3	5
2/WC	(United States) Taylor Fritz	6	7

Final
6	(Italy) Lorenzo Musetti	6	6
2/WC	(United States) Taylor Fritz	3	4

=== Top half ===
First round
WC	(Switzerland) S Wawrinka	6	6^{2}	7^{7}
(Spain) M Landaluce	3	7^{7}	6^{5}
(Italy) M Berrettini	6^{4}	5
Q	(France) K Jacquet	7^{7}	7
(Serbia) H Medjedovic	6^{4}	7^{7}	2
5	(United States) B Nakashima	7^{7}	6^{4}	6
(France) L Van Assche	7^{7}	6
Q	(France) C Tabur	6^{3}	3
(Italy) L Sonego	6^{2}	4
WC	(France) M Kouamé	7^{7}	6
(Italy) M Arnaldi	1	4
6	(Italy) L Musetti	6	6

Second round
1	(Italy) F Cobolli	6	6
WC	(Switzerland) S Wawrinka	2	4
Q	(France) K Jacquet	4	3
5	(United States) B Nakashima	6	6
3	(Monaco) V Vacherot	6	4	4
(France) L Van Assche	2	6	6
WC	(France) M Kouamé	4	4
6	(Italy) L Musetti	6	6

Quarterfinals
1	(Italy) F Cobolli	4	6	6
5	(United States) B Nakashima	6	4	4
(France) L Van Assche	6^{5}	7^{9}	4
6	(Italy) L Musetti	7^{7}	6^{7}	6

Semifinals
1	(Italy) F Cobolli	6	2	5
6	(Italy) L Musetti	4	6	7

=== Bottom half ===
First round
7	(France) U Humbert	2	7^{7}	6^{4}
(France) C Moutet	6	6^{5}	7^{7}
(Portugal) J Faria	2	6	3
NG	(France) F Balshaw	6	4	6
(France) B Bonzi	6	3	6
(United Kingdom) C Norrie	3	6	3
8	(United Kingdom) A Fery	3	6^{2}
Q	(Croatia) B Gojo	6	7^{7}
(Germany) D Altmaier	5	7^{7}	7^{7}
(France) T Droguet	7	6^{4}	6^{3}
Q	(France) P-H Herbert	6	6
(Argentina) S Báez	3	4

Second round
(France) C Moutet	6	6
NG	(France) F Balshaw	4	4
(France) B Bonzi	4	7^{7}	3
4	(United States) T Paul	6	6^{4}	6
Q	(Croatia) B Gojo	3	4
(Germany) D Altmaier	6	6
Q	(France) P-H Herbert	2	5
2/WC	(United States) T Fritz	6	7

Quarterfinals
(France) C Moutet	4	6	3
4	(United States) T Paul	6	3	6
(Germany) D Altmaier	6^{5}	2
2/WC	(United States) T Fritz	7^{7}	6

Semifinals
4	(United States) T Paul	3	5
2/WC	(United States) T Fritz	6	7

== Qualifying ==
=== Seeds ===
1. (France) Kyrian Jacquet (qualified)
2. (France) Valentin Royer (first round)
3. (Finland) Otto Virtanen (first round)
4. (Austria) Jurij Rodionov (first round)
5. (Serbia) Dušan Lajović (first round)
6. (Croatia) Borna Gojo (qualified)
7. (United States) Michael Mmoh (qualifying competition, retired)
8. (Norway) Nicolai Budkov Kjær (qualifying competition)

=== Qualifiers ===
1. (France) Kyrian Jacquet
2. (France) Clément Tabur
3. (Croatia) Borna Gojo
4. (France) Pierre-Hugues Herbert

=== Qualifying draw ===
==== First qualifier ====
First round
1	(France) Kyrian Jacquet	6	7
Alt	(France) Sascha Gueymard Wayenburg	3	5
(Czech Republic) Jan Kumstát	1	7^{7}	3
7	(United States) Michael Mmoh	6	6^{3}	6

Qualifying competition
1	(France) Kyrian Jacquet	7^{7}	0
7	(United States) Michael Mmoh	6^{1}	0^{r}

==== Second qualifier ====
First round
2	(France) Valentin Royer	6^{2}	7^{7}	2
(France) Clément Tabur	7^{7}	6^{3}	6
WC	(France) Ugo Blanchet	6	1	3
8	(Norway) Nicolai Budkov Kjær	3	6	6

Qualifying competition
(France) Clément Tabur	6	6
8	(Norway) Nicolai Budkov Kjær	4	1

==== Third qualifier ====
First round
3	(Finland) Otto Virtanen	4	4
(Ukraine) Vitaliy Sachko	6	6
(Italy) Francesco Maestrelli	6	3	6^{6}
6	(Croatia) Borna Gojo	4	6	7^{8}

Qualifying competition
(Ukraine) Vitaliy Sachko	3	6^{4}
6	(Croatia) Borna Gojo	6	7^{7}

==== Fourth qualifier ====
First round
4	(Austria) Jurij Rodionov	7^{7}	5	0
WC	(France) Pierre-Hugues Herbert	6^{5}	7	6
(Czech Republic) Maxim Mrva	7^{7}	7^{7}
5	(Serbia) Dušan Lajović	6^{4}	6^{5}

Qualifying competition
WC	(France) Pierre-Hugues Herbert	4	6	6
(Czech Republic) Maxim Mrva	6	3	1
