= 2018 Grand Prix Hassan II – Doubles =

Doubles
- 2018 Grand Prix Hassan II

Final
- Champions: (Croatia) Nikola Mektić (Austria) Alexander Peya
- Runners-up: (France) Benoît Paire (France) Édouard Roger-Vasselin
- Score: 7–5, 3–6, [10–7]

Events
Singles	Doubles
- Grand Prix Hassan II

Dominic Inglot and Mate Pavić were the defending champions, but Pavić chose not to participate this year. Inglot played alongside Marcus Daniell, but lost in the quarterfinals to Divij Sharan and Jan-Lennard Struff.

Nikola Mektić and Alexander Peya won the title, defeating Benoît Paire and Édouard Roger-Vasselin in the final, 7–5, 3–6, [10–7].

== Seeds ==
1. (Croatia) Nikola Mektić / (Austria) Alexander Peya (champions)
2. (Spain) Marc López / (Serbia) Nenad Zimonjić (first round)
3. (New Zealand) Marcus Daniell / (United Kingdom) Dominic Inglot (quarterfinals)
4. (Netherlands) Robin Haase / (Netherlands) Matwé Middelkoop (first round)

== Draw ==
Key

- Q = Qualifier
- WC = Wild card
- LL = Lucky loser
- Alt = Alternate
- ITF = ITF entry
- PR = Protected ranking
- SR = Special ranking
- SE = Special exempt
- JE = Junior exempt
- JR = Junior Accelerator Programme entrant
- CO = College Accelerator Programme entrant
- NG = Next Gen Accelerator Program entrant
- w/o = Walkover
- r = Retired
- d = Defaulted

=== Draw ===
First round
1	(Croatia) N Mektić (Austria) A Peya	6	6
WC	(Morocco) A Ahouda (Morocco) Y Idmbarek	0	2
(Netherlands) S Arends (Canada) A Shamasdin	7	7^{8}
WC	(Tunisia) M Jaziri (Morocco) L Ouahab	5	6^{6}
3	(New Zealand) M Daniell (United Kingdom) D Inglot	6	7^{7}
(Chile) H Podlipnik-Castillo (Belarus) A Vasilevski	3	6^{4}
(Netherlands) W Koolhof (New Zealand) A Sitak	6^{3}	3
(India) D Sharan (Germany) J-L Struff	7^{7}	6
(Spain) D Marrero (Poland) M Matkowski	5	7^{8}	[10]
(Sweden) R Lindstedt (Croatia) F Škugor	7	6^{6}	[8]
(United States) J Cerretani (Pakistan) A-u-H Qureshi	6	3	[10]
4	(Netherlands) R Haase (Netherlands) M Middelkoop	3	6	[3]
(Brazil) M Demoliner (Czech Republic) R Jebavý	4	7^{7}	[10]
(Italy) P Lorenzi (Germany) M Zverev	6	6^{5}	[4]
(France) B Paire (France) É Roger-Vasselin	6	6
2	(Spain) M López (Serbia) N Zimonjić	2	4

Quarterfinals
1	(Croatia) N Mektić (Austria) A Peya	3	6	[10]
(Netherlands) S Arends (Canada) A Shamasdin	6	3	[5]
3	(New Zealand) M Daniell (United Kingdom) D Inglot	7^{7}	0	[9]
(India) D Sharan (Germany) J-L Struff	6^{5}	6	[11]
(Spain) D Marrero (Poland) M Matkowski	6	7
(United States) J Cerretani (Pakistan) A-u-H Qureshi	4	5
(Brazil) M Demoliner (Czech Republic) R Jebavý	7^{7}	3	[5]
(France) B Paire (France) É Roger-Vasselin	6^{5}	6	[10]

Semifinals
1	(Croatia) N Mektić (Austria) A Peya	6	3	[11]
(India) D Sharan (Germany) J-L Struff	3	6	[9]
(Spain) D Marrero (Poland) M Matkowski	5	3
(France) B Paire (France) É Roger-Vasselin	7	6

Final
1	(Croatia) N Mektić (Austria) A Peya	7	3	[10]
(France) B Paire (France) É Roger-Vasselin	5	6	[7]
