= 2023 ATP Lyon Open – Singles =

Singles
- 2023 ATP Lyon Open

Final
- Champion: (France) Arthur Fils
- Runner-up: (Argentina) Francisco Cerúndolo
- Score: 6–3, 7–5

Details
- Draw: 28 (4 Q / 3 WC )
- Seeds: 8

Events
Singles	Doubles
- ATP Lyon Open

Arthur Fils defeated Francisco Cerúndolo in the final, 6–3, 7–5 to win the singles tennis title at the 2023 ATP Lyon Open. It was his first ATP Tour title.

Cameron Norrie was the defending champion, but lost in the semifinals to Cerúndolo.

Mikael Ymer was defaulted during his second-round match against Fils after he smashed the umpire's chair with his racket.

== Seeds ==
The top four seeds receive a bye into the second round.

1. (Canada) Félix Auger-Aliassime (quarterfinals, withdrew)
2. (United Kingdom) Cameron Norrie (semifinals)
3. (United States) Tommy Paul (quarterfinals)
4. (Argentina) Francisco Cerúndolo (final)
5. (Serbia) Miomir Kecmanović (second round)
6. (Argentina) Sebastián Báez (quarterfinals)
7. (France) Richard Gasquet (first round)
8. (United States) Brandon Nakashima (semifinals)

== Draw ==
Key

- Q = Qualifier
- WC = Wild card
- LL = Lucky loser
- Alt = Alternate
- ITF = ITF entry
- PR = Protected ranking
- SR = Special ranking
- SE = Special exempt
- JE = Junior exempt
- JR = Junior Accelerator Programme entrant
- CO = College Accelerator Programme entrant
- NG = Next Gen Accelerator Program entrant
- w/o = Walkover
- r = Retired
- d = Defaulted

=== Finals ===
Semifinals
WC	(France) Arthur Fils	7	4	7^{7}
8	(United States) Brandon Nakashima	5	6	6^{5}
4	(Argentina) Francisco Cerúndolo	6	6
2	(United Kingdom) Cameron Norrie	3	0

Final
WC	(France) Arthur Fils	6	7
4	(Argentina) Francisco Cerúndolo	3	5

=== Top half ===
First round
(Australia) M Purcell	4	7^{8}	1
Q	(Spain) P Llamas Ruiz	6	6^{6}	6
Q	(China) Z Zhang	3	2
WC	(France) A Fils	6	6
(Sweden) M Ymer	6	7
7	(France) R Gasquet	3	5
(France) G Barrère	6	6
(France) C Moutet	4	2
(France) A Rinderknech	6	6
Q	(South Africa) L Harris	4	2
(Argentina) D Schwartzman	5	3
8	(United States) B Nakashima	7	6

Second round
1/WC	(Canada) F Auger-Aliassime	7	6
Q	(Spain) P Llamas Ruiz	5	2
WC	(France) A Fils	6
(Sweden) M Ymer	5^{d}
3	(United States) T Paul	7^{8}	4	6
(France) G Barrère	6^{6}	6	3
(France) A Rinderknech	6^{6}	6	5
8	(United States) B Nakashima	7^{8}	1	7

Quarterfinals
1/WC	(Canada) F Auger-Aliassime
WC	(France) A Fils	w/o
3	(United States) T Paul	3	6^{4}
8	(United States) B Nakashima	6	7^{7}

Semifinals
WC	(France) A Fils	7	4	7^{7}
8	(United States) B Nakashima	5	6	6^{5}

=== Bottom half ===
First round
5	(Serbia) M Kecmanović	6	6
LL	(Spain) O Roca Batalla	1	3
(United Kingdom) J Draper	6	6
(France) A Müller	2	3
(Spain) A Ramos Viñolas	6	6^{7}	4
(Peru) JP Varillas	3	7^{9}	6
6	(Argentina) S Báez	6	7^{7}
(Hungary) M Fucsovics	4	6^{5}
WC	(France) G Monfils	6	3	4
(Argentina) P Cachin	2	6	6
(Belgium) D Goffin	6	6
Q	(Spain) Á López San Martín	1	3

Second round
5	(Serbia) M Kecmanović	4	5
(United Kingdom) J Draper	6	7
(Peru) JP Varillas	2	0^{r}
4	(Argentina) F Cerúndolo	6	0
6	(Argentina) S Báez	3	7	6
(Argentina) P Cachin	6	5	2
(Belgium) D Goffin	3	4
2	(United Kingdom) C Norrie	6	6

Quarterfinals
(United Kingdom) J Draper	6	4	3
4	(Argentina) F Cerúndolo	4	6	6
6	(Argentina) S Báez	2	6	1
2	(United Kingdom) C Norrie	6	2	6

Semifinals
4	(Argentina) F Cerúndolo	6	6
2	(United Kingdom) C Norrie	3	0

== Qualifying ==
=== Seeds ===
1. (China) Zhang Zhizhen (qualified)
2. (France) Hugo Grenier (first round)
3. (Australia) Dane Sweeny (first round)
4. (Spain) Pablo Llamas Ruiz (qualified)
5. (Argentina) Hernán Casanova (first round)
6. (France) Manuel Guinard (first round)
7. (Spain) Oriol Roca Batalla (qualifying competition, lucky loser)
8. (Poland) Daniel Michalski (first round)

=== Qualifiers ===
1. (China) Zhang Zhizhen
2. (Spain) Álvaro López San Martín
3. (South Africa) Lloyd Harris
4. (Spain) Pablo Llamas Ruiz

=== Lucky loser ===
1. (Spain) Oriol Roca Batalla

=== Qualifying draw ===
==== First qualifier ====
First round
1	(China) Zhang Zhizhen	7^{7}	6
Alt	(France) Maxime Janvier	6^{4}	2
WC	(France) Kyrian Jacquet	4	7	2
7	(Spain) Oriol Roca Batalla	6	5	6

Qualifying competition
1	(China) Zhang Zhizhen	6	6^{8}	6
7	(Spain) Oriol Roca Batalla	2	7^{10}	1

==== Second qualifier ====
First round
2	(France) Hugo Grenier	3	1
Alt	(France) Ugo Blanchet	6	6
(Spain) Álvaro López San Martín	6	6
5	(Argentina) Hernán Casanova	3	0

Qualifying competition
Alt	(France) Ugo Blanchet	3	3
(Spain) Álvaro López San Martín	6	6

==== Third qualifier ====
First round
3	(Australia) Dane Sweeny	4	1
(Kazakhstan) Beibit Zhukayev	6	6
(South Africa) Lloyd Harris	3	6	6
6	(France) Manuel Guinard	6	4	1

Qualifying competition
(Kazakhstan) Beibit Zhukayev	3	2
(South Africa) Lloyd Harris	6	6

==== Fourth qualifier ====
First round
4	(Spain) Pablo Llamas Ruiz	2	6	6
Alt	(Argentina) Guido Andreozzi	6	1	2
WC	(France) Matteo Martineau	6	6
8	(Poland) Daniel Michalski	3	4

Qualifying competition
4	(Spain) Pablo Llamas Ruiz	7^{9}	6
WC	(France) Matteo Martineau	6^{7}	3
