= 2026 Grand Prix Auvergne-Rhône-Alpes =

Tennis competition

- Date: 19–25 October
- Edition: 8th
- Category: ATP 250
- Draw: 28S/16Q/16D
- Surface: Hard / indoor
- Location: Lyon, France
- Venue: LDLC Arena

Champions

Singles
- (Italy) Lorenzo Musetti

Doubles
- (United Kingdom) Julian Cash / (United Kingdom) Lloyd Glasspool
- ATP Lyon Open

The 2026 Grand Prix Auvergne-Rhône Alpes was a men's tennis tournament to be played on indoor hard courts. It was the 8th edition of the ATP Lyon Open and part of the ATP 250 series of the 2026 ATP Tour. It took place at the LDLC Arena in Lyon, France, from 19 to 25 October 2026. This edition marked the return of the ATP Tour to Lyon after an absence of one year and replaced the Open 13 Provence in Marseille on the ATP Tour calendar.

== Champions ==
=== Singles ===
- (Italy) Lorenzo Musetti def. (United States) Taylor Fritz, 6–3, 6–4

=== Doubles ===
- (United Kingdom) Julian Cash / (United Kingdom) Lloyd Glasspool def. (France) Théo Arribagé / (France) Albano Olivetti, 4–6, 6–3, [10–8]

== Singles main draw entrants ==
=== Seeds ===
Country	Player	Rank^{1}	Seed
ITA	Flavio Cobolli	7	1
USA	Taylor Fritz	12	2
MON	Valentin Vacherot	14	3
USA	Tommy Paul	18	4
USA	Brandon Nakashima	19	5
ITA	Lorenzo Musetti	25	6
FRA	Ugo Humbert	32	7
GBR	Arthur Fery	37	8

- Rankings are as of 5 October 2026.

=== Other entrants ===
The following players received wildcards into the singles main draw:

- (United States) Taylor Fritz
- (France) Moïse Kouamé
- (Switzerland) Stan Wawrinka

The following player received entry through the Next Gen Accelerator program:

- (France) Felix Balshaw

The following player received entry as a late entry:

- (Italy) Flavio Cobolli

The following players received entry from the qualifying draw:

- (Croatia) Borna Gojo
- (France) Pierre-Hugues Herbert
- (France) Kyrian Jacquet
- (France) Clément Tabur

=== Withdrawals ===
- (France) Arthur Géa → replaced by (Serbia) Hamad Medjedovic
- (Poland) Hubert Hurkacz → replaced by (France) Corentin Moutet
- (France) Arthur Rinderknech → replaced by (France) Benjamin Bonzi
- (Canada) Denis Shapovalov → replaced by (Portugal) Jaime Faria
- (United States) Frances Tiafoe → replaced by (Germany) Daniel Altmaier

== Doubles main draw entrants ==
=== Seeds ===
Country	Player	Country	Player	Rank^{1}	Seed
GBR	Julian Cash	GBR	Lloyd Glasspool	26	1
FRA	Théo Arribagé	FRA	Albano Olivetti	39	2
MON	Hugo Nys	FRA	Édouard Roger-Vasselin	55	3
USA	Robert Cash	AUT	Alexander Erler	94	4

- Rankings are as of 5 October 2026.

=== Other entrants ===
The following pairs received wildcards into the doubles main draw:

- (Monaco) Romain Arneodo / (France) Ugo Blanchet
- (France) Matisse Bobichon / (Switzerland) Kilian Feldbausch
