= 2023 ATP Lyon Open – Doubles =

Doubles
- 2023 ATP Lyon Open

Final
- Champions: (United States) Rajeev Ram (United Kingdom) Joe Salisbury
- Runners-up: (France) Nicolas Mahut (Netherlands) Matwé Middelkoop
- Score: 6–0, 6–3

Events
Singles	Doubles
- ATP Lyon Open

Rajeev Ram and Joe Salisbury defeated Nicolas Mahut and Matwé Middelkoop in the final, 6–0, 6–3 to win the doubles tennis title at the 2023 ATP Lyon Open.

Ivan Dodig and Austin Krajicek were the reigning champions, but withdrew before the tournament began.

== Seeds ==
1. (United States) Rajeev Ram / (United Kingdom) Joe Salisbury (champions)
2. (Argentina) Máximo González / (Argentina) Andrés Molteni (first round)
3. (France) Nicolas Mahut / (Netherlands) Matwé Middelkoop (final)
4. (Belgium) Sander Gillé / (Belgium) Joran Vliegen (quarterfinals)

== Draw ==
Key

- Q = Qualifier
- WC = Wild card
- LL = Lucky loser
- Alt = Alternate
- ITF = ITF entry
- PR = Protected ranking
- SR = Special ranking
- SE = Special exempt
- JE = Junior exempt
- JR = Junior Accelerator Programme entrant
- CO = College Accelerator Programme entrant
- NG = Next Gen Accelerator Program entrant
- w/o = Walkover
- r = Retired
- d = Defaulted

=== Draw ===
First round
1	(United States) R Ram (United Kingdom) J Salisbury	4	6	[10]
(Monaco) R Arneodo (Austria) S Weissborn	6	3	[4]
(Kazakhstan) A Nedovyesov (Mexico) MÁ Reyes-Varela	7^{7}	6
(Ecuador) G Escobar (Kazakhstan) A Golubev	6^{4}	3
4	(Belgium) S Gillé (Belgium) J Vliegen	7^{7}	7^{7}
(Sweden) A Göransson (Japan) B McLachlan	6^{5}	6^{3}
(Colombia) N Barrientos (France) A Olivetti	6	6
WC	(France) U Blanchet (France) M Guinard	3	4
(India) Y Bhambri (India) S Myneni	7^{7}	3	[10]
(Colombia) JS Cabal (Colombia) R Farah	6^{4}	6	[8]
Alt	(Argentina) G Andreozzi (Argentina) G Durán	3	6	[9]
3	(France) N Mahut (Netherlands) M Middelkoop	6	4	[11]
(Portugal) F Cabral (Brazil) R Matos	7^{7}	4	[8]
(France) S Doumbia (France) F Reboul	6^{0}	6	[10]
(Netherlands) R Haase (Austria) P Oswald	7^{8}	6
2	(Argentina) M González (Argentina) A Molteni	6^{6}	1

Quarterfinals
1	(United States) R Ram (United Kingdom) J Salisbury	4	6	[10]
(Kazakhstan) A Nedovyesov (Mexico) MÁ Reyes-Varela	6	3	[6]
4	(Belgium) S Gillé (Belgium) J Vliegen	3	7^{11}	[10]
(Colombia) N Barrientos (France) A Olivetti	6	6^{9}	[12]
(India) Y Bhambri (India) S Myneni	1	2
3	(France) N Mahut (Netherlands) M Middelkoop	6	6
(France) S Doumbia (France) F Reboul	6	6
(Netherlands) R Haase (Austria) P Oswald	0	3

Semifinals
1	(United States) R Ram (United Kingdom) J Salisbury	7^{7}	6
(Colombia) N Barrientos (France) A Olivetti	6^{4}	3
3	(France) N Mahut (Netherlands) M Middelkoop	w/o
(France) S Doumbia (France) F Reboul

Final
1	(United States) R Ram (United Kingdom) J Salisbury	6	6
3	(France) N Mahut (Netherlands) M Middelkoop	0	3
