= Matisse Bobichon =

French tennis player (born 2002)

- Country (sports): France
- Born: 16 January 2002 (age 24) Villeurbanne, France
- Height: 1.85 m (6 ft 1 in)
- Plays: Right-handed
- College: Oklahoma State; VCU
- Prize money: US $44,886

Singles
- Career record: 0–0 (at ATP Tour level, Grand Slam level, and in Davis Cup)
- Career titles: 0
- Highest ranking: No. 487 (2 November 2026)
- Current ranking: No. 487 (2 November 2026)

Doubles
- Career record: 2–1 (at ATP Tour level, Grand Slam level, and in Davis Cup)
- Career titles: 0
- Highest ranking: No. 461 (26 October 2026)
- Current ranking: No. 462 (2 November 2026)
- Last updated on: 2 November 2026.

Matisse Bobichon (born 16 January 2002) is a French tennis player. He has a career high ATP singles ranking of No. 487 achieved on 2 November 2026 and a career high ATP doubles ranking of No. 461 achieved on 26 October 2026.

Bobichon played college tennis at Oklahoma State before transferring to VCU.

== Career ==
Bobichon made his ATP main draw debut at the 2026 Grand Prix Auvergne-Rhône-Alpes after receiving a wildcard for the doubles main draw, where he recorded his first tour-level win.
