= 2018 ATP Lyon Open – Singles =

Singles
- 2018 ATP Lyon Open

Final
- Champion: (Austria) Dominic Thiem
- Runner-up: (France) Gilles Simon
- Score: 3–6, 7–6^{(7–2)}, 6–1

Details
- Draw: 28 (4 Q / 3 WC )
- Seeds: 8

Events
Singles	Doubles
- ATP Lyon Open

Jo-Wilfried Tsonga was the defending champion, but due to injury did not defend his title.

Dominic Thiem won the title, defeating Gilles Simon in the final, 3–6, 7–6^{(7–2)}, 6–1.

== Seeds ==
The top four seeds receive a bye into the second round.

1. (Austria) Dominic Thiem (champion)
2. (United States) John Isner (quarterfinals)
3. (United States) Jack Sock (second round)
4. (South Korea) Chung Hyeon (withdrew)
5. (France) Adrian Mannarino (first round)
6. (France) Gaël Monfils (first round)
7. (Portugal) João Sousa (first round)
8. (Australia) John Millman (withdrew)

== Draw ==
Key

- Q = Qualifier
- WC = Wild card
- LL = Lucky loser
- Alt = Alternate
- ITF = ITF entry
- PR = Protected ranking
- SR = Special ranking
- SE = Special exempt
- JE = Junior exempt
- JR = Junior Accelerator Programme entrant
- CO = College Accelerator Programme entrant
- NG = Next Gen Accelerator Program entrant
- w/o = Walkover
- r = Retired
- d = Defaulted

=== Finals ===
Semifinals
1	(Austria) Dominic Thiem	6	5	6
(Serbia) Dušan Lajović	4	7	4
(France) Gilles Simon	6	7^{8}
(United Kingdom) Cameron Norrie	1	6^{6}

Final
1	(Austria) Dominic Thiem	3	7^{7}	6
(France) Gilles Simon	6	6^{2}	1

=== Top half ===
First round
(Spain) R Carballés Baena	7^{7}	6^{4}	6
Q	(Serbia) L Đere	6^{3}	7^{7}	3
WC	(France) C Moutet	7^{7}	4	3
(France) C Hemery	6^{4}	6	6
(Spain) G García López	6	4	6
5/WC	(France) A Mannarino	3	6	1
(United States) T Fritz	6	6
(Australia) M Ebden	4	2
(Serbia) D Lajović	6	6
(Argentina) H Zeballos	4	2
Q	(Slovakia) F Horanský	6	3	6
7	(Portugal) J Sousa	4	6	4

Second round
1	(Austria) D Thiem	6	6
(Spain) R Carballés Baena	2	4
(France) C Hemery	6^{4}	3
(Spain) G García López	7^{7}	6
3	(United States) J Sock	6^{6}	2
(United States) T Fritz	7^{8}	6
(Serbia) D Lajović	6	7
Q	(Slovakia) F Horanský	4	5

Quarterfinals
1	(Austria) D Thiem	6^{4}	7^{7}	6
(Spain) G García López	7^{7}	6^{0}	4
(United States) T Fritz	5	1
(Serbia) D Lajović	7	6

Semifinals
1	(Austria) D Thiem	6	5	6
(Serbia) D Lajović	4	7	4

=== Bottom half ===
First round
LL	(Argentina) F Coria	4	6	7
(Argentina) N Kicker	6	1	5
WC	(France) G Barrère	2	3
(Kazakhstan) M Kukushkin	6	6
(France) G Simon	6	6
Q	(Spain) J Samper Montaña	4	2
6	(France) G Monfils	6	4	4
(Germany) M Marterer	2	6	6
(United Kingdom) C Norrie	7^{7}	6
Q	(Dominican Republic) J Hernández-Fernández	6^{5}	1
(Argentina) F Delbonis	7^{9}	5	4
(Moldova) R Albot	6^{7}	7	6

Second round
LL	(Argentina) F Coria	2	3
(Kazakhstan) M Kukushkin	6	6
(France) G Simon	7^{7}	6
LL	(Belgium) J De Loore	6^{3}	2
(Germany) M Marterer	1	4
(United Kingdom) C Norrie	6	6
(Moldova) R Albot	6^{3}	3
2	(United States) J Isner	7^{7}	6

Quarterfinals
(Kazakhstan) M Kukushkin	6	4	6^{5}
(France) G Simon	4	6	7^{7}
(United Kingdom) C Norrie	7^{7}	6
2	(United States) J Isner	6^{1}	4

Semifinals
(France) G Simon	6	7^{8}
(United Kingdom) C Norrie	1	6^{6}

== Qualifying ==
=== Seeds ===
1. (Serbia) Laslo Đere (qualified)
2. (Ecuador) Roberto Quiroz (first round)
3. (Dominican Republic) José Hernández-Fernández (qualified)
4. (Colombia) Alejandro González (first round)
5. (France) Maxime Janvier (first round)
6. (Canada) Steven Diez (first round)
7. (Argentina) Federico Coria (qualifying competition, lucky loser)
8. (Russia) Evgeny Karlovskiy (first round)

=== Qualifiers ===
1. (Serbia) Laslo Đere
2. (Slovakia) Filip Horanský
3. (Dominican Republic) José Hernández-Fernández
4. (Spain) Jordi Samper Montaña

=== Lucky losers ===
1. (Argentina) Federico Coria
2. (Belgium) Joris De Loore

=== Qualifying draw ===
==== First qualifier ====
First round
1	(Serbia) Laslo Đere	6	6
(Belgium) Yannick Mertens	4	3
(Belgium) Joris De Loore	4	6	7
5	(France) Maxime Janvier	6	3	5

Qualifying competition
1	(Serbia) Laslo Đere	7	6
(Belgium) Joris De Loore	5	4

==== Second qualifier ====
First round
2	(Ecuador) Roberto Quiroz	4	2
(Slovakia) Filip Horanský	6	6
WC	(France) Antoine Cornut-Chauvinc	5	6	6
6	(Canada) Steven Diez	7	2	1

Qualifying competition
(Slovakia) Filip Horanský	6	6
WC	(France) Antoine Cornut-Chauvinc	1	3

==== Third qualifier ====
First round
3	(Dominican Republic) José Hernández-Fernández	7^{7}	6
(France) Tristan Lamasine	6^{2}	4
(France) Axel Michon	3	0
7	(Argentina) Federico Coria	6	6

Qualifying competition
3	(Dominican Republic) José Hernández-Fernández	6	6
7	(Argentina) Federico Coria	2	4

==== Fourth qualifier ====
First round
4	(Colombia) Alejandro González	6	3	5
(Spain) Jordi Samper Montaña	3	6	7
WC	(France) Matteo Martineau	6	3	6
8	(Russia) Evgeny Karlovskiy	3	6	3

Qualifying competition
(Spain) Jordi Samper Montaña	6	4	6
WC	(France) Matteo Martineau	3	6	3
