= 2018 ATP Lyon Open – Doubles =

Doubles
- 2018 ATP Lyon Open

Final
- Champions: (Australia) Nick Kyrgios; (United States) Jack Sock
- Runners-up: (Czech Republic) Roman Jebavý; (Netherlands) Matwé Middelkoop
- Score: 7–5, 2–6, [11–9]

Details
- Draw: 16 (2 WC )
- Seeds: 4

Events
Singles	Doubles
- ATP Lyon Open

Andrés Molteni and Adil Shamasdin were the defending champions, but Shamasdin chose to play in Geneva instead. Molteni played alongside Guillermo Durán but lost in the second round to Nick Kyrgios and Jack Sock.

Kyrgios and Sock went on to win the title, defeating Roman Jebavý and Matwé Middelkoop in the final, 7–5, 2–6, [11–9].

== Seeds ==
1. (Pakistan) Aisam-ul-Haq Qureshi / (Netherlands) Jean-Julien Rojer (first round)
2. (India) Rohan Bopanna / (France) Édouard Roger-Vasselin (quarterfinals)
3. (Chile) Julio Peralta / (Argentina) Horacio Zeballos (quarterfinals)
4. (Poland) Marcin Matkowski / (Japan) Ben McLachlan (first round)

== Draw ==
Key

- Q = Qualifier
- WC = Wild card
- LL = Lucky loser
- Alt = Alternate
- ITF = ITF entry
- PR = Protected ranking
- SR = Special ranking
- SE = Special exempt
- JE = Junior exempt
- JR = Junior Accelerator Programme entrant
- CO = College Accelerator Programme entrant
- NG = Next Gen Accelerator Program entrant
- w/o = Walkover
- r = Retired
- d = Defaulted

=== Draw ===
First round

Quarterfinals

Semifinals

Final

1
- (Pakistan) A-u-H Qureshi
- (Netherlands) J-J Rojer
4
2

- (Spain) G García López
- (India) D Sharan
6
6

- (Spain) G García López
- (India) D Sharan
6^{7}
7^{10}
[10]

- (United States) J Cerretani
- (United States) N Monroe
3
7^{7}
[4]

- (United Kingdom) K Skupski
- (United Kingdom) N Skupski
7^{9}
6^{8}
[8]

- (United Kingdom) K Skupski
- (United Kingdom) N Skupski
6
6^{4}
[10]

- (Spain) G García López
- (India) D Sharan
5
4

4
- (Poland) M Matkowski
- (Japan) B McLachlan
6
5
[2]

- (Australia) N Kyrgios
- (United States) J Sock
7
6

- (Argentina) G Durán
- (Argentina) A Molteni
2
7
[10]

- (Argentina) G Durán
- (Argentina) A Molteni
2
2

- (Australia) N Kyrgios
- (United States) J Sock
7^{7}
6

- (Australia) N Kyrgios
- (United States) J Sock
6
6

- (Argentina) F Delbonis
- (Portugal) J Sousa
6^{3}
3

- (Australia) N Kyrgios
- (United States) J Sock
7
2
[11]

- (France) F Martin
- (India) P Raja
7^{8}
7^{7}

- (Czech Republic) R Jebavý
- (Netherlands) M Middelkoop
5
6
[9]

- (Chile) H Podlipnik Castillo
- (United States) J Withrow
6^{6}
6^{5}

- (France) F Martin
- (India) P Raja
7
6

- (Argentina) M González
- (Chile) N Jarry
2
7^{7}
[5]

3
- (Chile) J Peralta
- (Argentina) H Zeballos
5
4

3
- (Chile) J Peralta
- (Argentina) H Zeballos
6
6^{3}
[10]

- (France) F Martin
- (India) P Raja
5
1

- (Czech Republic) R Jebavý
- (Netherlands) M Middelkoop
6
3
[11]

- (Czech Republic) R Jebavý
- (Netherlands) M Middelkoop
7
6

WC
- (France) J Eysseric
- (France) H Nys
3
6
[9]

- (Czech Republic) R Jebavý
- (Netherlands) M Middelkoop
5
6
[10]

WC
- (France) G Barrère
- (France) T Lamasine
6
1
[5]

2
- (India) R Bopanna
- (France) É Roger-Vasselin
7
4
[7]

2
- (India) R Bopanna
- (France) É Roger-Vasselin
3
6
[10]
