= ATP Lyon Open =

Grand Prix Auvergne-Rhône-Alpes
- 2026 Grand Prix Auvergne-Rhône-Alpes

Tournament information
- Founded: 2017
- Editions: 8 (2026)
- Location: Lyon; France
- Venue: LDLC Arena
- Category: ATP Tour 250
- Surface: Indoor hard (2026-)
- Draw: 28S / 16Q / 16D
- Website: grandprix-auvergnerhonealpes.com

Current champions (2026)
- Singles: (Italy) Lorenzo Musetti
- Doubles: (United Kingdom) Julian Cash (United Kingdom) Lloyd Glasspool

The Grand Prix Auvergne-Rhône-Alpes, known also as the ATP Lyon Open, is a professional tennis tournament on the ATP Tour held in the French city of Lyon. It is an ATP 250 tournament, played on indoor hardcourts.

From 2017 until 2024, it was played on outdoor clay courts. The tournament was removed from the 2025 ATP calendar and subsequently in 2026 it was revived as an indoor hardcourt event to replace the Open 13 Provence in Marseille. Thierry Ascione, the tournament director for the 2017–2024 editions, returned as the tournament director in 2026.

Ivan Dodig is the doubles record holder with two victories.

== Results ==
=== Singles ===
Year	Champion	Runner-up	Score
2017	(France) Jo-Wilfried Tsonga	(Czech Republic) Tomáš Berdych	7–6^{(7–2)}, 7–5
2018	(Austria) Dominic Thiem	(France) Gilles Simon	3–6, 7–6^{(7–2)}, 6–1
2019	(France) Benoît Paire	(Canada) Félix Auger-Aliassime	6–4, 6–3
2020	Not held due to COVID-19		
2021	(Greece) Stefanos Tsitsipas	(United Kingdom) Cameron Norrie	6–3, 6–3
2022	(United Kingdom) Cameron Norrie	(Slovakia) Alex Molčan	6–3, 6–7^{(3–7)}, 6–1
2023	(France) Arthur Fils	(Argentina) Francisco Cerúndolo	6–3, 7–5
2024	(France) Giovanni Mpetshi Perricard	(Argentina) Tomás Martín Etcheverry	6–4, 1–6, 7–6^{(9–7)}
2025	Not held		
2026	(Italy) Lorenzo Musetti	(United States) Taylor Fritz	6–3, 6–4

=== Doubles ===
Year	Champions	Runners-up	Score
2017	(Argentina) Andrés Molteni (Canada) Adil Shamasdin	(New Zealand) Marcus Daniell (Brazil) Marcelo Demoliner	6–3, 3–6, [10–5]
2018	(Australia) Nick Kyrgios (United States) Jack Sock	(Czech Republic) Roman Jebavý (Netherlands) Matwé Middelkoop	7–5, 2–6, [11–9]
2019	(France) Édouard Roger-Vasselin (Croatia) Ivan Dodig (1)	(United Kingdom) Ken Skupski (United Kingdom) Neal Skupski	6–4, 6–3
2020	Not held due to COVID-19		
2021	(Monaco) Hugo Nys (Germany) Tim Pütz	(France) Pierre-Hugues Herbert (France) Nicolas Mahut	6–4, 5–7, [10–8]
2022	(United States) Austin Krajicek (Croatia) Ivan Dodig (2)	(Argentina) Máximo González (Brazil) Marcelo Melo	6–3, 6–4
2023	(United States) Rajeev Ram (United Kingdom) Joe Salisbury	(France) Nicolas Mahut (Netherlands) Matwé Middelkoop	6–0, 6–3
2024	(Finland) Harri Heliövaara (United Kingdom) Henry Patten	(France) Albano Olivetti (India) Yuki Bhambri	3–6, 7–6^{(7–4)}, [10–8]
2025	Not held		
2026	(United Kingdom) Julian Cash (United Kingdom) Lloyd Glasspool	(France) Théo Arribagé (France) Albano Olivetti	4–6, 6–3, [10–8]

== See also ==
- Grand Prix de Tennis de Lyon currently known as "Open Occitanie".
- Open 13 Provence
- WTA Lyon Open
