= Benoît Paire =

French tennis player (born 1989)

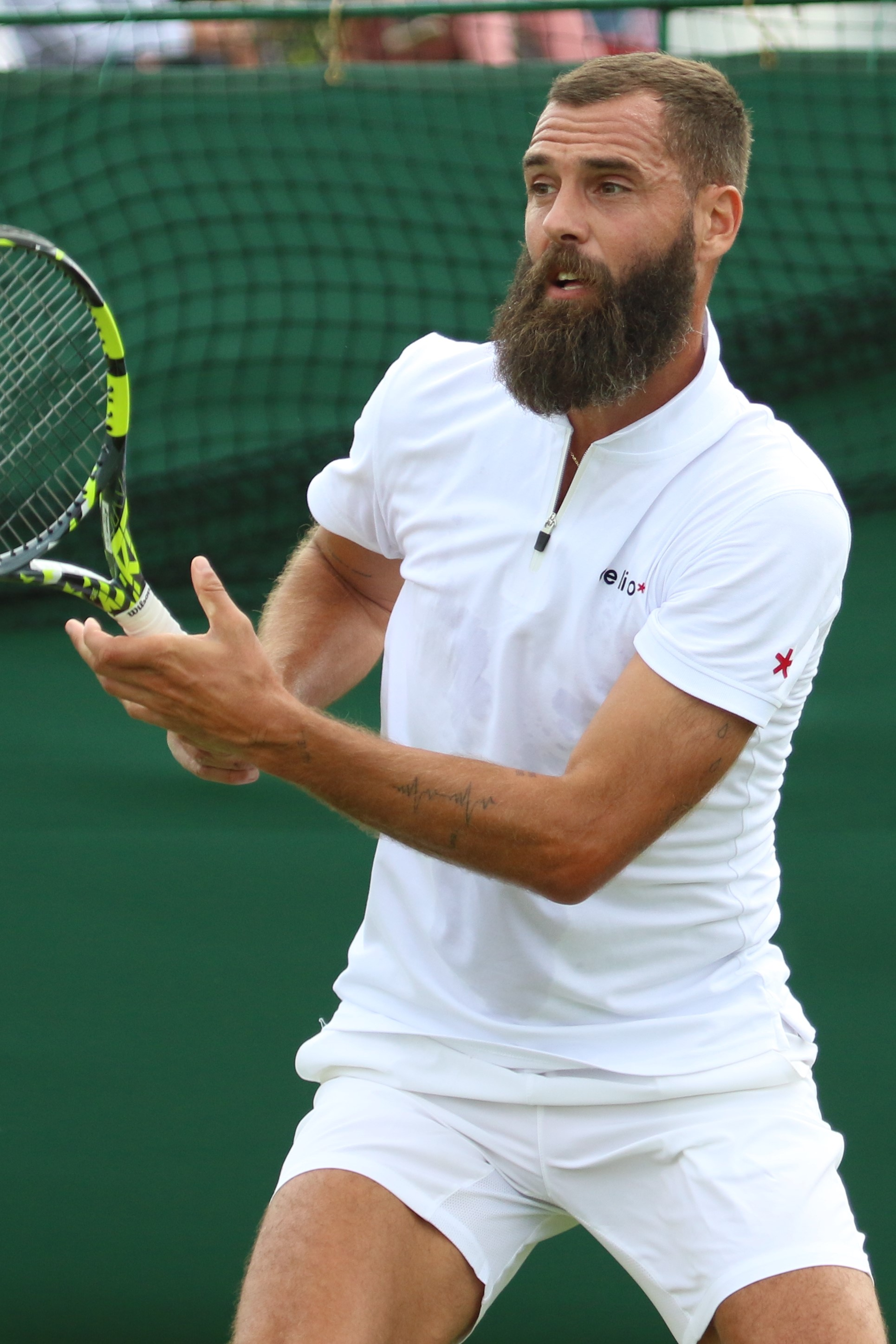
- Paire at the 2023 Wimbledon Championships
- Country (sports): France
- Residence: Geneva, Switzerland
- Born: 8 May 1989 (age 37) Avignon, France
- Height: 1.96 m (6 ft 5 in)
- Turned pro: 2007
- Retired: Jan 2026 (last match played)
- Plays: Right-handed (two-handed backhand)
- Coach: Dave Marshall
- Prize money: US $10,541,203

Singles
- Career record: 243–298
- Career titles: 3
- Highest ranking: No. 18 (11 January 2016)

Grand Slam singles results
- Australian Open: 3R (2014, 2017, 2022)
- French Open: 4R (2019)
- Wimbledon: 4R (2017, 2019)
- US Open: 4R (2015)

Doubles
- Career record: 77–145
- Career titles: 1
- Highest ranking: No. 65 (15 November 2021)

Grand Slam doubles results
- Australian Open: QF (2013)
- French Open: 3R (2021)
- Wimbledon: 1R (2012, 2013, 2014, 2015, 2016, 2018, 2019, 2022)
- US Open: 3R (2021)

Grand Slam mixed doubles results
- French Open: 1R (2022)
- Last updated on: 8 May 2026.

Benoît "Ben" Paire (French pronunciation: [bənwa pɛːʁ]; born 8 May 1989) is a French inactive professional tennis player. He has a career-high singles ranking of World No. 18, achieved in January 2016.

He has won three singles titles, at the 2015 Swedish Open, the 2019 Marrakesh Open and the 2019 Lyon Open. His best result in a Grand Slam has been reaching the fourth round on four occasions. He has a career-high ranking of World No. 65 in doubles achieved on 15 November 2021.

In 2015, Paire was voted Comeback Player of the Year, rising from world No. 118 ATP singles ranking at year-end 2014 to a then career-high world No. 19 at year-end 2015, after a knee injury had sidelined him for much of 2014.

== Career ==
=== 2007–09: Early career ===
In 2007, the year he turned professional, Paire played at the Futures level, winning one event (the France F10). In 2008, Paire continued to play primarily on the Futures circuit, but made his first appearances in higher-tier tournaments, losing in the qualifying rounds at the Open 13 and the Open Sud de France, both part of the ATP 250 Series. Similarly, Benoît made it to the main draw for the first time at Challenger level at Alessandria. Paire played in his first Grand Slam tournament, at the French Open, receiving a wildcard in the qualifying draw but lost in the first round. In 2009, Paire began playing more Challenger tournaments, but at Futures level won the Slovenia F3 and lost in three other finals in the space of three months. Again that year, he received a wildcard into the French Open qualifying draw, this time making it into the final qualifying round, before losing to Fabio Fognini.

=== 2010: Major main draw and Masters qualifying debuts ===
In 2010, Paire played mostly at the Challenger level, reaching his first Challenger final at Arad in July, where he lost to fellow countryman David Guez. Paire still played many Futures tournaments, making it to six finals (winning three).

However, Benoît began making a lot of progress at the ATP level, receiving a wildcard into the Open Sud de France before losing in the first round to John Isner and getting through qualifying in Valencia again before losing in the first round. For the first time, Paire made it to the second round of a Grand Slam, coming through qualifying and beating Rainer Schüttler before losing to big-serving Feliciano López in five sets at the US Open. This success came after a first-round defeat at Roland Garros for the second time in his career (again after coming through qualifying), as well as a first-round loss in qualifying at Wimbledon. Paire played his first ATP Masters event in Paris, losing in qualifying.

=== 2011: First Challenger title, Top 100 debut ===
2011 was Paire's most successful year to date, making more ATP main draw appearances than the rest of his career put together. It was a year in which he increased his ranking around sixty places and broke into the top 100 in the ATP rankings on 2 May 2011, for the first time in his career.

Paire also appeared in the main draw in three of the four Grand Slams (and for the first time without needing to qualify), his best result at this level coming at the 2011 Australian Open, losing in the second round to former world No. 3 and 17th seed, Ivan Ljubičić. Paire played in five ATP 250 tournaments, making it to the second round in both Stuttgart and Metz, as well as coming through qualifying and making it into the second round in the two ATP 500 tournaments he played, Barcelona and Rotterdam, the latter in which he beat compatriot, top 20 player and former world No. 6 Gilles Simon in three sets. Paire again missed out on making his first appearance in a main draw at a Masters event, losing in qualifying in both Paris (for the second time in two years), as well as in Monte Carlo.

At Challenger level, Paire made it to a couple more finals, the first at the Open Saint–Brieuc event in April, losing to fellow countryman Maxime Teixeira, before beating Teixera later to win his first Challenger title at 2011 Ropharma Challenger Brașov. Paire followed this victory with another in Salzburg just a month later, defeating Grega Žemlja in three sets in the final.

=== 2012: First ATP Tour singles final ===
Benoît kicked off his 2012 season at the Chennai Open, beating French Open quarterfinalist Fabio Fognini for the loss of just one game, before falling to Israeli Dudi Sela in the second round, despite leading by a set.

Continuing his preparation for the Australian Open, Paire played at the Heineken Open in Auckland, coming through qualifying before beating former world no. 1 Juan Carlos Ferrero and 4th seed Juan Ignacio Chela to make it to his first ever quarterfinal in an ATP event. Here he lost to eventual finalist Olivier Rochus in three sets. At the Australian Open, Paire drew top twenty-five player and former world No. 9 Stan Wawrinka in the first round, falling in straight sets. Benoît next played two back-to-back ATP 250 events at the Brasil Open (losing in the first round to David Nalbandian), and a week later the Buenos Aires where he was again beaten by Stan Wawrinka. Benoît played his third clay court tournament in a row at the Mexican Open (part of the ATP 500 Series), losing in the second round to clay court specialist Nicolás Almagro, despite taking the first set. Next, Benoît competed in back-to-back ATP Masters 1000 events Indian Wells & Miami. At Indian Wells, Paire lost is in the first round to VTR Open runner-up, Carlos Berlocq, this represented Benoît's first main draw participation at this level. Despite this, Paire had to qualify in Miami, and lost in the final round of qualifying to David Goffin.

Following the North American swing, Paire returned to the clay in Casablanca, making his second quarterfinal appearance of the season. Benoît resumed the clay court season in Barcelona, losing in the second round for the second year in a row. The week after Benoît made it to his first ATP World Tour singles final at the Serbian Open, part of the ATP 250 series. On his way to the final Paire knocked out the sixth seed, third seed and top seed (Pablo Andújar), before losing in the final to Andreas Seppi in straight sets. Benoît made his seventh clay-court appearance of the season in Nice as a wildcard, losing in the first round to compatriot Roger-Vasselin. At the 2012 French Open, Benoît reached the second round for the first time in his career, losing to eventual semifinalist David Ferrer in straight sets. Paire didn't play a warm-up event at either Queens or Halle, yet reached the third round at 2012 Wimbledon Championships, his best performance in a Grand Slam event, beating Matthew Ebden and twenty-second seed Alexandr Dolgopolov on the way. He lost to American qualifier Brian Baker in the third round. He followed up his impressive grass court run at Wimbledon with a semifinalist showing in s-Hertogenbosch, losing to eventual winner David Ferrer in three sets.

On 16 July 2012, Benoît defeated eighth-seeded Bernard Tomic in straight sets in the first round of the Swiss Open. He lost against Latvian, Ernests Gulbis, in the second round. Paire entered an ATP Tour event as the number one seed for the first time in his career at the Farmers Classic in July, but lost at the first hurdle to American Michael Russell.

=== 2013: Maiden Masters semifinal and first top 10 win ===
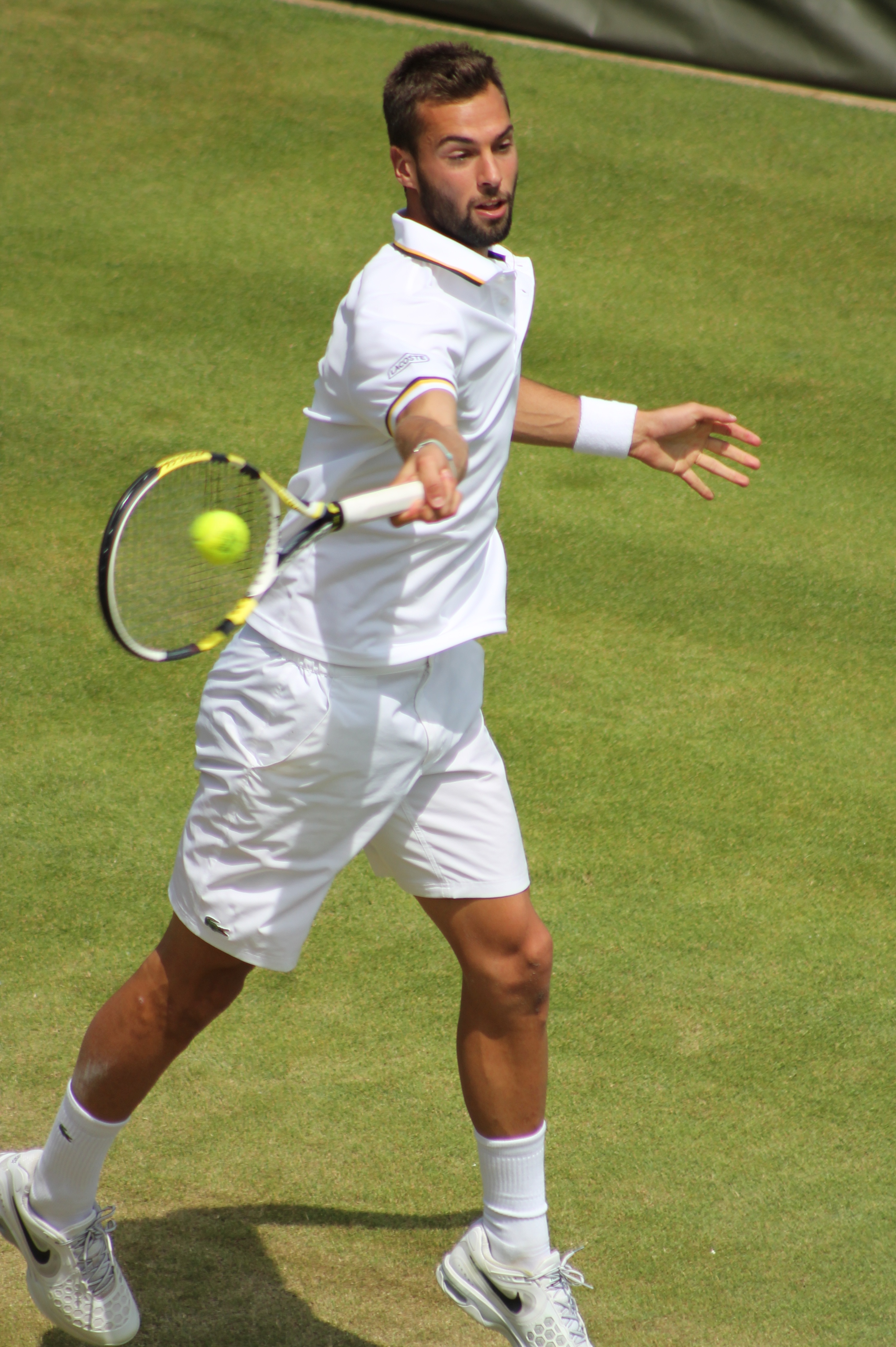
Paire at Wimbledon 2013

Paire started his 2013 season in promising fashion, reaching the semifinals in his first tournament of the year in Chennai before making his 2nd ATP World Tour final at Montpellier. Playing in front of his parents, he lost in straight sets to an in-form Richard Gasquet. "I really needed them to see how I have changed and I need to keep going. I feel I am on the right track if I stay calm and focused", he said. His performance in this tournament rose him to a career-high (at the time) ranking of No. 38 on 11 February 2013.

After a first-round exit at the Miami Masters event, Paire reached his second final of the season at the 2013 Orange Open Guadeloupe in Le Gosier. This time he prevailed after a tough 3-set battle with Sergiy Stakhovsky, claiming his third Challenger level title, and reaching a new career-high ranking of No. 33 on 1 April 2013.

At the Internazionali BNL d'Italia, Paire defeated World No. 7 Juan Martín del Potro 6–4, 7–6^{(7–3)} to record his first career singles win over a Top 10 player and reach the singles quarterfinals of an ATP World Tour Masters 1000 tournament for the first time in his career. Paire went on to reach the semifinals where he was beaten in two tight sets by Roger Federer. At the tournament in Stockholm in October, the 6th-seeded Paire beat the 2nd-seeded Milos Raonic of Canada in the quarterfinals to reach the semifinals, where he lost to Grigor Dimitrov in three sets.

=== 2014: Injury and comeback ===
Paire began his 2014 season in the Chennai Open, reaching the quarterfinals before losing to Marcel Granollers in three sets. At the Australian Open, Paire battled past Nick Kyrgios from 2 sets down in the second round to beat the Australian teenager, however, lost to Roberto Bautista Agut in straight sets in the third round. He missed every tournament in February and March due to a knee injury, including Masters 1000 events in Indian Wells and Miami. He made his return during the clay court season, first playing at the Grand Prix Hassan II, making it to the quarterfinals before losing to eventual champion Guillermo García López.

This was followed by an appearance in Monte-Carlo, losing his opening match to qualifier Albert Montañés, the same player he'd beaten in his opening match in Casablanca. A recurrence of his knee injury forced Paire to retire towards the end of his first match in Barcelona, and subsequently withdraw from the Portugal Open. He started the Madrid Masters against Andreas Seppi, however further recurrence of his knee injury forced him to retire after just two games. He withdrew from the Rome Masters to allow his knee to recover, however did start the French Open, ending a run of four consecutive defeats by beating Alejandro Falla in the first round before losing to Roberto Bautista Agut in his next match.

Paire suffered three consecutive losses during the grass court season, at queen's Club, 's-Hertogenbosch and Wimbledon respectively, followed by a further first round loss in Stuttgart. In June 2014, after he lost in the first round at Wimbledon, he said that he was happy to lose because he "hates" the tournament.

At the Rogers Cup, Paire had to make it through the qualifying draw due to his ranking having dropped to 98th in the world. He beat Falla in the first round before losing a tightly contested match against third seed Stan Wawrinka. He qualified for Cincinnati, however, lost his first round match against wildcard Steve Johnson, resulting in Paire dropping out of the top 100 for the first time since April 2012. At the US Open, Paire made a promising start by beating 24th seed Julien Benneteau in five sets, 7–6^{(7–4)}, 5–7, 6–4, 4–6, 6–4. However, he fell in the second round to Spaniard Pablo Carreño Busta.

=== 2015: First ATP Tour singles title and first Grand Slam fourth round ===
Paire (who was unseeded), won his first ATP Tour singles title in July at the Swedish Open, defeating the top three seeds, including second-seeded Tommy Robredo in the final.

Paire defeated the 2014 US Open singles runner-up and 4th seed Kei Nishikori in the 1st round of the US Open, before going on to defeat Tommy Robredo in the 3rd round of the US Open to reach the singles 4th round of a Grand Slam for the first time in his career. He lost his 4th-round match to his compatriot, Jo-Wilfried Tsonga, in straight sets.

=== 2016: Career high top 20 ranking ===
At the 2016 Australian Open, although he was seeded 17th, Paire lost in the first round in three tie-breaks to American teen-aged wildcard Noah Rubin, ranked # 328 in the world.

On 19 July, Richard Gasquet withdrew from the 2016 Olympics tennis tournament because of his back injury. Gasquet would be replaced by Paire in the men's singles draw. On 9 August, Paire (seeded no.16) had two match points in the third and final set of his Olympic tournament second round match against Fabio Fognini, but Fognini ended up winning the match. Moments after being knocked out of the Olympic tournament, the French Tennis Federation booted Paire out of his country's Olympic Games squad and ordered him to leave the athletes' village for "flouting the rules" and "poor behaviour".

=== 2017: Wimbledon fourth round ===
Paire entered his first ATP World Tour tournament of 2017 by playing in the Chennai Open, where he lost in the singles semifinals to the eventual champion Roberto Bautista Agut. At the Australian Open Paire lost in the third round to the eighth seed Dominic Thiem. Paire lost three other ATP World Tour singles semifinals in the first half of 2017 – Open Sud de France (where he lost to Richard Gasquet), Grand Prix Hassan II and MercedesCup (where he lost to Lucas Pouille).

Paire, who was attempting to reach his first career Grand Slam singles quarter-final, lost in straight sets in the fourth round of Wimbledon to top-seeded defending champion Andy Murray. In September, Paire (seeded no. 7) reached his first and only ATP World Tour singles final of 2017 at the Moselle Open, losing the final to the German qualifier Peter Gojowczyk in straight sets.

=== 2018: Second Rome Masters third round ===
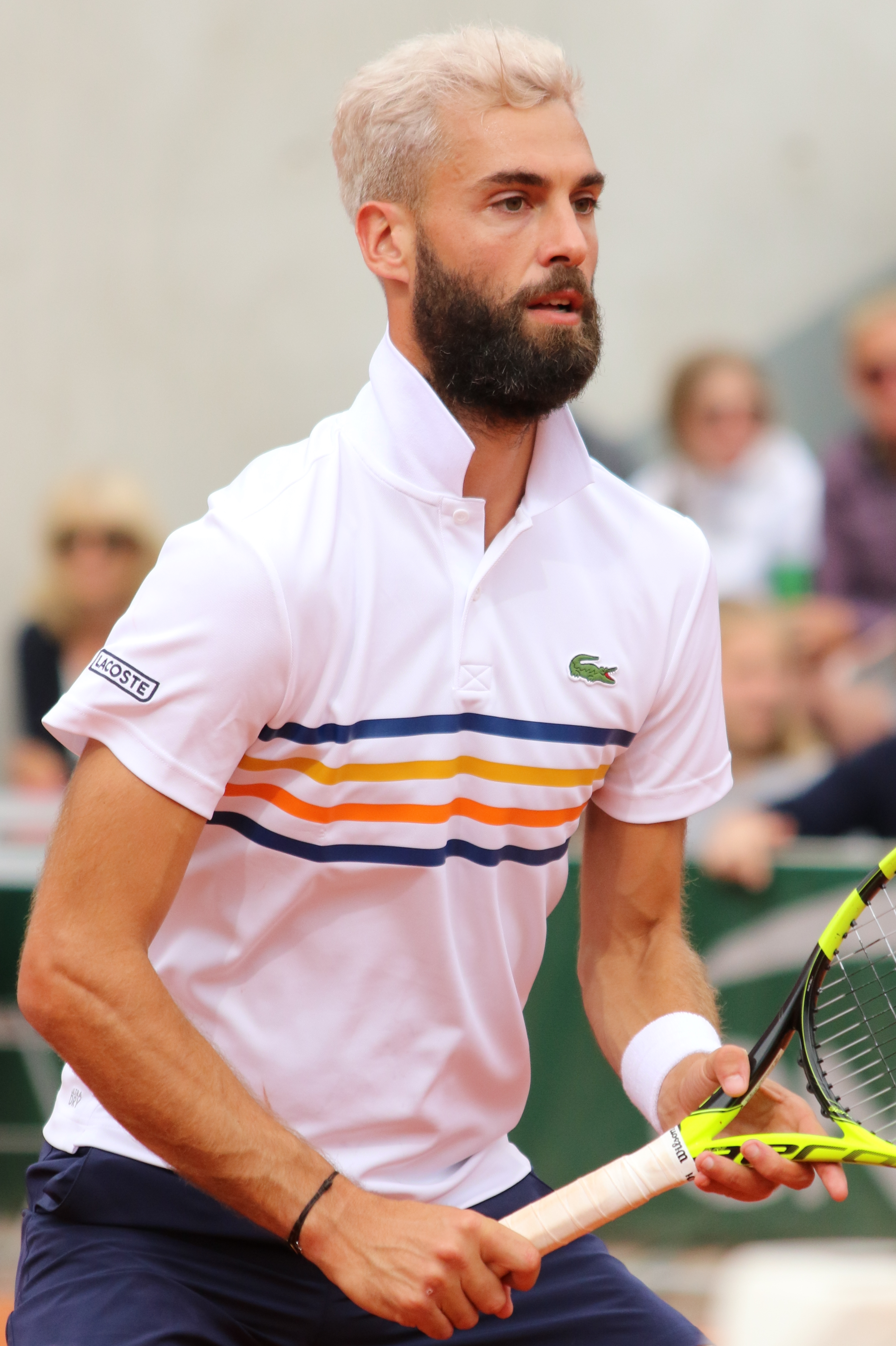
Paire at the 2018 French Open

Paire started his 2018 season at the Maharashtra Open. Seeded fourth, he reached the semifinals where he lost to second seed, world No. 14, and eventual finalist, Kevin Anderson. In Sydney, he knocked out second seed, world No. 25, and defending champion, Gilles Müller, in his quarterfinal match. He was defeated in the semifinals by Australian rising star and eventual finalist, Alex de Minaur. At the Australian Open, he lost in the first round to Guillermo García López.

In February, Paire played at the Open Sud de France. He made it to the quarterfinals where he was beaten by second seed, world No. 17, compatriot, and eventual champion, Lucas Pouille. In Dubai, he lost in the second round to Borna Ćorić. At the BNP Paribas Open, he was defeated in the first round by American qualifier Mitchell Krueger. At the Miami Open, he upset ninth seed, world No. 12, and six-time champion, Novak Djokovic, in the second round. He fell in his third-round match to 22nd seed and world No. 27, Filip Krajinović.

Paire started his clay-court season at the Grand Prix Hassan II in Marrakesh. Seeded sixth, he lost in the first round to compatriot, Gilles Simon, in three sets, despite having a match point in the third set. In Monte-Carlo, he was defeated in the first round by Feliciano López.

At the 2018 Washington Open, Paire smashed his tennis rackets onto the court 7 times and was fined $16,500 for his conduct.

=== 2019: Second and third ATP Tour singles titles, French and Wimbledon fourth rounds ===
At the Grand Prix Hassan II (the only ATP Tour tournament held in Africa in 2019), Paire won the second ATP Tour singles title of his career by defeating the defending champion Pablo Andújar in straight sets 6–2, 6–3 in the final held on 14 April.

At the Lyon Open, the unseeded Paire won the third ATP Tour singles title of his career. At that tournament, he defeated two seeded players – Denis Shapovalov in the quarterfinals and rising teen Félix Auger-Aliassime in the final.

At the French Open, the unseeded Paire advanced to the round of 16, where he was defeated in five sets by no.7 seed Kei Nishikori. He also advanced to the fourth round of the 2019 Wimbledon.

=== 2020: Ninth ATP final, loss of form during COVID season ===
Paire started his 2020 season by representing France at the first edition of the ATP Cup. France was in Group A alongside Chile, Serbia, and South Africa. He won his first match over Nicolás Jarry of Chile. In his second match, he beat Dušan Lajović of Serbia. In his final match, he lost to Kevin Anderson of South Africa. In the end, France ended 3rd in Group A. Seeded fifth at the ASB Classic in Auckland, he reached his ninth ATP singles final and lost to compatriot Ugo Humbert. Seeded 21st at the Australian Open, he was defeated in the second round by 2018 finalist Marin Čilić.

After the Australian Open, Paire competed at the Maharashtra Open in Pune. As the top seed, he suffered a second-round loss at the hands of qualifier Roberto Marcora. In Rotterdam, he lost in the first round to Aljaž Bedene. Seeded sixth at the Open 13 Provence in Marseille, he lost in the second round to Alexander Bublik. Seeded eighth at the Dubai Championships, he fell in the second round to compatriot Richard Gasquet. The ATP tour canceled tournaments from March through July due to the COVID-19 pandemic.

When the ATP resumed tournament play in August, Paire competed at the Western & Southern Open. Instead of the tournament being held in Cincinnati, it was held in New York. He retired during his first round match against Borna Ćorić due to being unwell. He tested positive for COVID-19 one day prior to the start of the US Open.

Paire returned to action in September by competing at the Italian Open. He lost in the first round to Italian wildcard Jannik Sinner. At the Hamburg Open, he retired during his first-round match against Casper Ruud; he tested positive for Covid prior to the match. Seeded 23rd at the French Open, he lost in the second round to Federico Coria.

After Roland Garros, Paire played at the first edition of the Bett1Hulks Indoors, a tournament primarily organized due to the cancellation of many tournaments in 2020 because of the COVID-19 pandemic. Seeded fourth, he was defeated in the second round by Dennis Novak. His final tournament of the year was at the first edition of the Astana Open, another tournament organized due to the cancellation of many tournaments because of COVID-19. As the top seed, he lost in the second round to Mikhail Kukushkin.

Paire ended the year ranked No. 28.

=== 2021: Olympics participation ban, Cincinnati quarterfinal, Two Major third rounds & top 65 in doubles ===
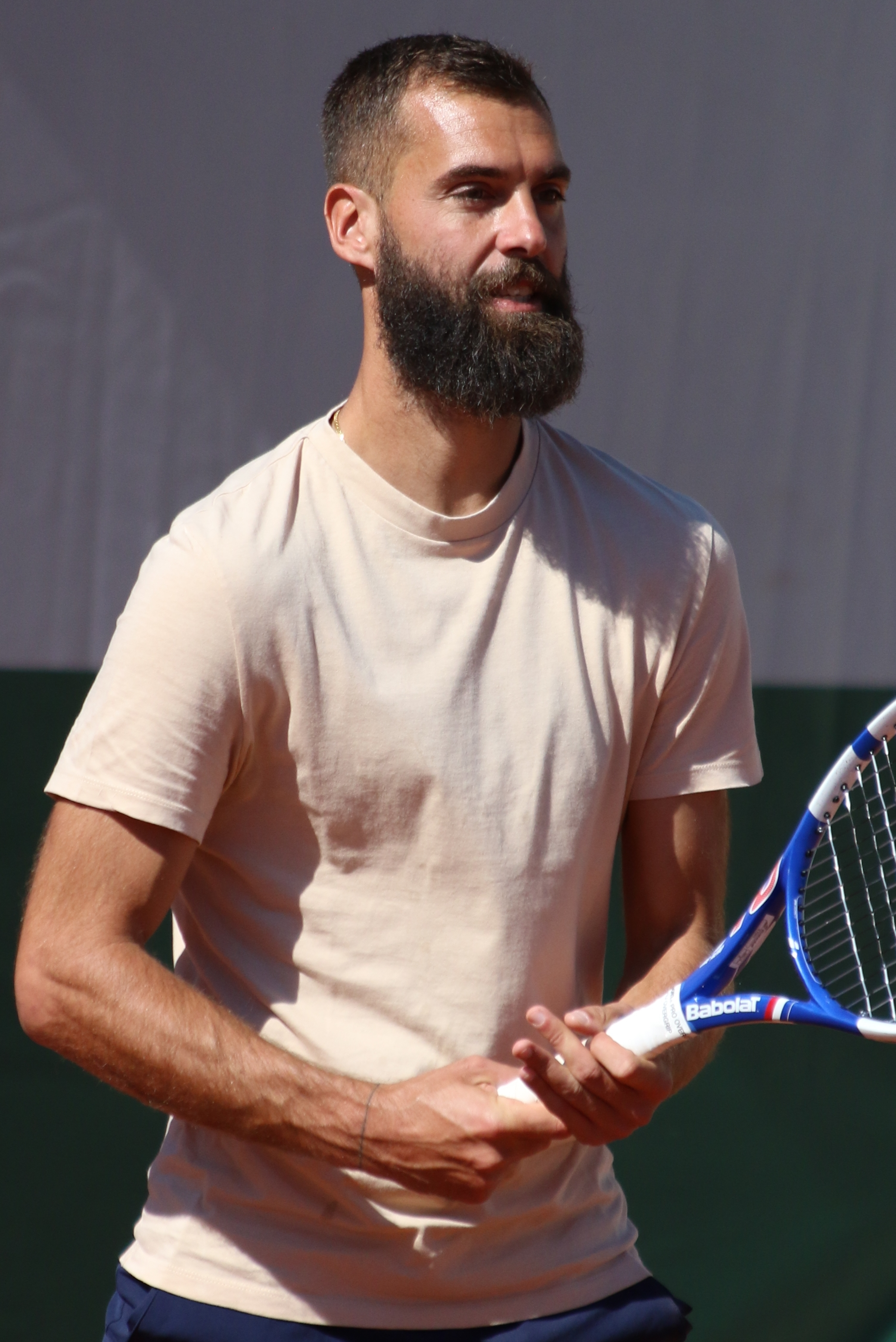
Paire at the 2021 French Open

Paire began his 2021 season by competing for France at the ATP Cup. France was in Group C alongside Italy and Austria. He lost his first match to Fabio Fognini. He then retired from his match against Dominic Thiem due to an elbow injury. In the end, France ended 2nd in Group C. At the Australian Open, he was eliminated in the first round by Egor Gerasimov in four sets. He blamed the loss on 'shameful' treatment of players by the tournament organizers during quarantine and associated training restrictions, describing the tournament as 'shit', 'crap', and 'grotesque'. This outburst resulted in him being barred by France from participation in the Tokyo Summer Olympics.

Seeded second at the Córdoba Open, Paire reached the quarterfinals where he was defeated by Federico Coria. However, in doubles, he and partner, Romain Arneodo, made it to the final where they fell to Brazilian team Rafael Matos and Felipe Meligeni Alves. Seeded third in Buenos Aires, he lost in the second round to Argentinian qualifier Francisco Cerúndolo. Seeded second at the Chile Open, he was beaten in the second round by qualifier Holger Rune. At the Mexican Open in Acapulco, he lost in the first round to top seed, world No. 5, and eventual finalist, Stefanos Tsitsipas. Seeded 23rd in Miami, he was defeated in the second round by Lorenzo Musetti.

Paire started his clay-court season by competing at the Monte-Carlo Masters. He lost in a three-hour first-round match to Jordan Thompson. Playing in Barcelona, he was eliminated in the first round by lucky loser Federico Gaio.

At the 2021 Western & Southern Open Paire reached just his second Masters 1000 quarterfinal (first was in Rome 2013) where he was defeated by eventual finalist Andrey Rublev. En route he defeated World No. 10 Denis Shapovalov, his seventh top-10 win and John Isner.

At the 2021 French Open and 2021 US Open he reached the third rounds in doubles for the first time with R. Arneodo and R. Berankis respectively which allowed him to reach his career-high of No. 65 on 8 November 2021.

=== 2022: Loss of form, out of top 150 ===
Paire started his 2022 season at the first edition of the Melbourne Summer Set 1. He retired for undisclosed reasons during the third set of his first-round match against lucky loser Henri Laaksonen. At the Adelaide International 2, he lost in the first round to Australian wildcard and eventual champion, Thanasi Kokkinakis. At the Australian Open, he reached the third round defeating 26th seed Grigor Dimitrov before losing in four sets to world No. 4 Stefanos Tsitsipas.

Seeded seventh at the Córdoba Open, Paire was eliminated in the first round by Jaume Munar. At the Argentina Open, he fell in the first round to fifth seed Dušan Lajović in three sets, despite having three match points in the second set. In Rio, he lost in the first round to Francisco Cerúndolo. At the Mexican Open, he was defeated in the first round by top seed and world No. 2, Daniil Medvedev. Playing at the BNP Paribas Open, he was beaten in the first round by Dominik Koepfer in three sets, despite having a 6–2, 5–2 lead in the match. As the top seed at the Arizona Classic, he lost in the second round to Radu Albot. In Miami, he lost in the first round to Henri Laaksonen.

Beginning his clay-court season at the Monte-Carlo Masters, Paire lost in the first round to Lorenzo Musetti. In Barcelona, he was defeated in the first round by Kwon Soon-woo. At the Estoril Open, he lost in the first round to Kwon Soon-woo. Getting past qualifying at the Mutua Madrid Open, he lost in the first round to 13th seed and world No. 15, Diego Schwartzman. In Rome, he fell in the first round of qualifying to Dušan Lajović. At the Geneva Open, he got his first ATP win since January by beating Emil Ruusuvuori in the first round in three sets. He lost in the second round to second seed, world No. 8, defending champion, and eventual champion, Casper Ruud. At the French Open, he was defeated in the first round by Ilya Ivashka in four sets.

Starting his grass-court season at the BOSS Open in Stuttgart, Paire lost in the first round to sixth seed Lorenzo Sonego. Seeded second at the Aspria Tennis Cup, a clay-court challenger in Milan, he retired during his first-round match against Alexey Vatutin. At Wimbledon, he lost in the first round to compatriot Quentin Halys.

The week of July 18 saw Paire compete at the Swiss Open Gstaad. He retired from his first-round match against qualifier Elias Ymer due to a right groin injury.

Paire started the US Open Series at the Atlanta Open. He lost in the first round to sixth seed and eventual finalist, Jenson Brooksby. As a result, his ranking fell from No. 94 to out of the top 100 at No. 112. At the Citi Open in Washington, D.C., he got his first ATP tour victory since May by defeating Peter Gojowczyk in the first round. He was defeated in the second round by ninth seed and world No. 28, Holger Rune. Getting past qualifying at the National Bank Open in Montreal, he lost in the first round to Yoshihito Nishioka. At the Western & Southern Open in Cincinnati, he retired during his first round of qualifying match against Thanasi Kokkinakis. Due to not defending his quarterfinalist points from last year, his ranking fell from 110 to 164. At the US Open, he lost in the first round to seventh seed and world No. 9, Cameron Norrie.

After the US Open, Paire played at the Open de Rennes. Seeded seventh, he reached the quarterfinals where he lost to top seed and compatriot, Hugo Gaston. Seeded eighth at the Braga Open, he retired during his second-round match against qualifier Javier Barranco Cosano due to respiratory issues. He returned to action during the week of September 26 at the Lisboa Belém Open. He made it to the quarterfinals where he lost to Timofey Skatov. At the Brest Challenger, he retired during his second-round encounter against fifth seed, Jelle Sels, due to injuring his lower back. He played his final tournament of the season in November at the Matsuyama Challenger. Seeded fifth, he retired during his second-round match against Hsu Yu-hsiou citing a wrist injury.

Paire ended the year ranked No. 179.

=== 2023: Back to Challenger Tour, French Open wildcard ===
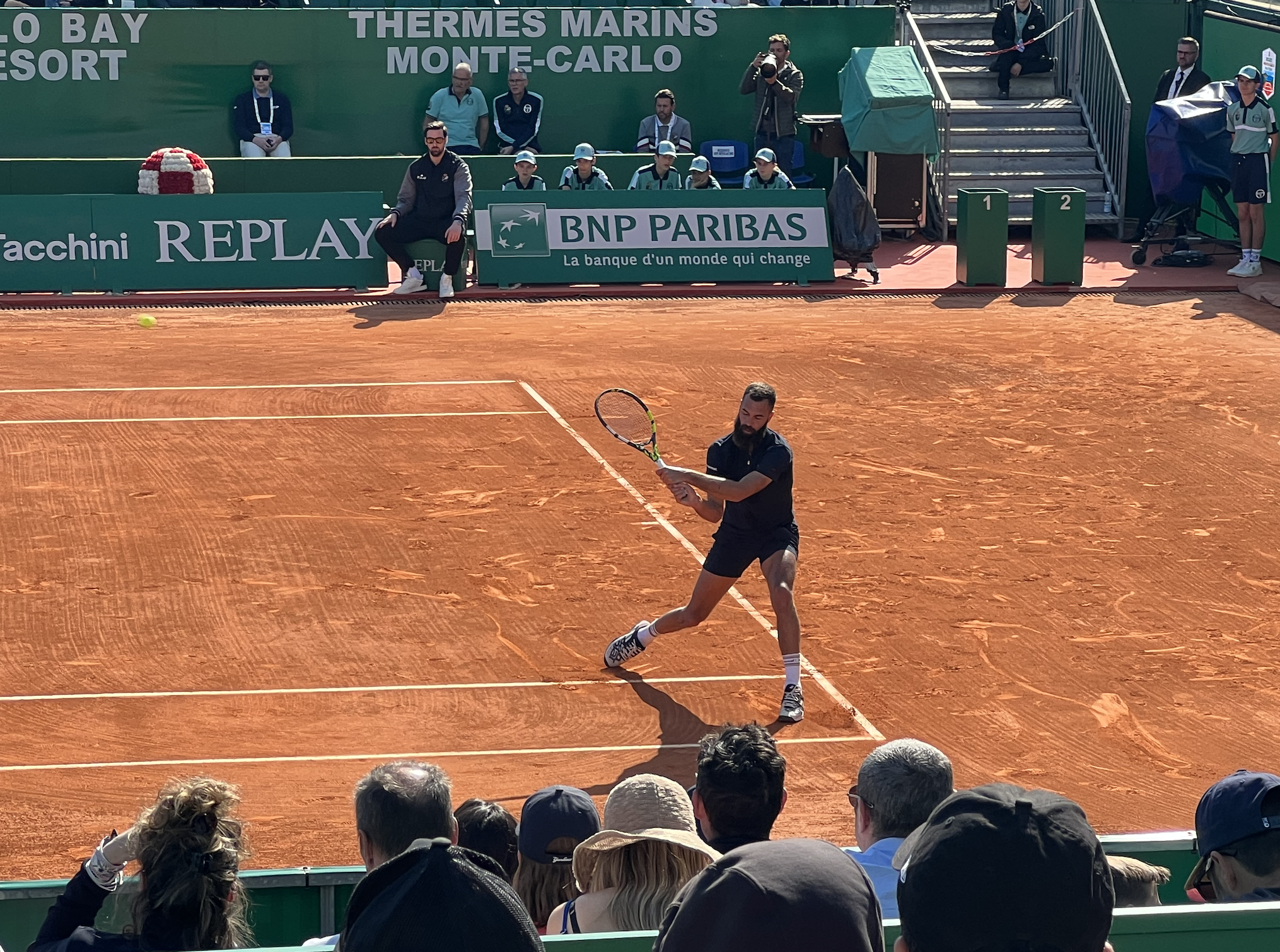
Paire in Monte-Carlo in 2023.

Paire started his 2023 season at the Open Nouvelle-Calédonie in Nouméa. Seeded sixth, he reached the quarterfinals where he lost to eventual champion Raúl Brancaccio. At the Tenerife Challenger, he was defeated in the first round by Kaichi Uchida. At the Australian Open, he fell in the second round of qualifying to Michael Mmoh.

At the Open Quimper Bretagne, Paire lost in the first round to qualifier Illya Marchenko. Seeded eighth at the Tenerife Challenger II, he was defeated in the first round by Santiago Rodríguez Taverna. In Montpellier, he fell in the final round of qualifying to Luca Nardi. At the Monterrey Challenger, he lost in the second round to eighth seed Yosuke Watanuki. In Waco, he was defeated in the first round by sixth seed Borna Gojo. Seeded fifth at the Puerto Vallarta Open, Paire won his 13th Challenger title by beating Yuta Shimizu in the final. This was his first tennis title since 2019. At the Arizona Classic, he lost in the first round of qualifying to Leandro Riedi. Getting past qualifying at the Miami Open, he lost his first-round match again to fellow qualifier Yosuke Watanuki.

He received a wildcard for the 2023 French Open, losing in the first round to Cameron Norrie. In July, Paire won his 14th Challenger title in San Benedetto, Italy as the 8th seed, defeating top seed Richard Gasquet in the finals.

== Playing style ==
Paire's style of play is characterized by its flashiness, unpredictability and at times inconsistency. The main strength of his game is his double-handed backhand, known for its speed and spin. Paire often uses topspin backhands crosscourt at great speed and acute angles to set up a powerful backhand down-the-line to finish off points. In contrast, his forehand is relatively less powerful and consistent, particularly when played on the defense, to the extent that he's been known to hit backhands inside-out.

Paire is also known for his ability and willingness to play drop shots often on both the forehand and backhand wing throughout matches. When volleying, he also favors drop over punching volleys and is famous for hitting them with extreme backspin, sometimes even causing the ball to spin back across the net. However, these drop shot attempts sometimes give opponents the advantage when they are hit too deep, causing Paire to lose the point. He is also fond of hitting between-the-legs shots, both forward and with his back facing the net. Paire possesses a powerful but inconsistent first serve and serves-and-volleys on occasion.

Above all, Paire is known for his flashiness on the court that plays to the crowd. He is known to hit a variety of high-risk shots and trick shots, such as the frontal and back tweener, jumping tweener, drop shots that backspin towards the net and topspin backhands at extremely acute angles, even when unnecessary to win the point.

== Performance timelines ==
Key
W	F	SF	QF	#R	RR	Q#	P#	DNQ	A	Z#	PO	G	S	B	NMS	NTI	P	NH

(W) winner; (F) finalist; (SF) semifinalist; (QF) quarterfinalist; (#R) rounds 4, 3, 2, 1; (RR) round-robin stage; (Q#) qualification round; (P#) preliminary round; (DNQ) did not qualify; (A) absent; (Z#) Davis/Fed Cup Zonal Group (with number indication) or (PO) play-off; (G) gold, (S) silver or (B) bronze Olympic/Paralympic medal; (NMS) not a Masters tournament; (NTI) not a Tier I tournament; (P) postponed; (NH) not held; (SR) strike rate (events won / competed); (W–L) win–loss record.
To avoid confusion and double counting, these charts are updated at the conclusion of a tournament or when the player's participation has ended.

=== Singles ===
Current through the 2024 French Open.

Tournament	2008	2009	2010	2011	2012	2013	2014	2015	2016	2017	2018	2019	2020	2021	2022	2023	2024	2025	SR	W–L	Win%
Grand Slam tournaments
Australian Open	A	A	A	2R	1R	1R	3R	Q1	1R	3R	1R	1R	2R	1R	3R	Q2	Q1		0 / 11	8–11	42%
French Open	Q1	Q3	1R	1R	2R	3R	2R	3R	2R	1R	2R	4R	2R	1R	1R	1R	Q1		0 / 14	12–14	46%
Wimbledon	A	A	Q1	1R	3R	3R	1R	2R	2R	4R	3R	4R	NH	1R	1R	Q1	Q1		0 / 11	14–11	56%
US Open	A	A	2R	Q1	2R	1R	2R	4R	2R	2R	2R	2R	A	1R	1R	Q2	Q1		0 / 11	10–11	48%
Win–loss	0–0	0–0	1–2	1–3	4–4	4–4	4–4	6–3	3–4	6–4	4–4	7–4	2–2	0–4	2–4	0–1			0 / 47	44–47	48%
ATP Masters 1000
Indian Wells	A	A	A	A	1R	3R	A	A	2R	1R	1R	1R	NH	1R	1R	A	Q1		0 / 8	2–8	20%
Miami Masters	A	A	A	A	Q2	1R	A	Q2	3R	3R	3R	1R	NH	2R	1R	1R	Q1		0 / 8	5–8	42%
Monte Carlo Masters	A	A	A	Q1	A	2R	1R	2R	3R	1R	1R	A	NH	1R	1R	Q2	A		0 / 8	4–8	33%
Madrid Masters	A	A	A	A	A	2R	1R	A	1R	3R	2R	Q1	NH	2R	1R	1R	A		0 / 8	5–8	42%
Rome Masters	A	A	A	A	A	SF	A	Q2	2R	2R	3R	1R	1R	1R	Q1	A	A		0 / 7	8–7	53%
Canada Masters	A	A	A	A	A	3R	2R	A	1R	2R	2R	1R	NH	2R	1R	A			0 / 8	6–8	43%
Cincinnati Masters	A	A	A	A	A	1R	1R	2R	1R	1R	2R	2R	1R	QF	Q1	A			0 / 9	6–9	40%
Shanghai Masters	NMS	A	A	A	2R	2R	A	A	2R	1R	2R	2R	NH			A			0 / 6	5–6	45%
Paris Masters	A	A	Q1	Q2	2R	1R	A	2R	1R	1R	1R	2R	A	1R	A	A			0 / 7	3–7	30%
Win–loss	0–0	0–0	0–0	0–0	2–3	11–9	1–4	3–3	5–9	6–9	8–9	3–7	0–2	5–7	0–5	0–2	0–0	0–0	0 / 70	34–70	33%
Career statistics
	2008	2009	2010	2011	2012	2013	2014	2015	2016	2017	2018	2019	2020	2021	2022	2023	2024	2025	Career		
Tournaments	0	0	4	10	26	30	19	18	32	31	28	30	12	28	22	4	3	0	297		
Titles	0	0	0	0	0	0	0	1	0	0	0	2	0	0	0	0	0	0	3		
Finals	0	0	0	0	1	1	0	2	0	1	0	3	1	0	0	0	0	0	9		
Overall win–loss	0–0	0–0	1–4	5–10	26–26	32–30	10–19	25–17	23–32	31–31	27–28	34–29	10–13	13–30	4–22	0–4	2–3	0–0	3 / 297	243–298	45%
Win %	–	–	20%	33%	50%	52%	34%	60%	42%	50%	49%	54%	43%	30%	15%	33%	40%	–	44.92%		
Year-end ranking	629	331	152	95	47	26	118	19	47	41	52	24	28	46	180	117	415	775	$10,541,203		

=== Doubles ===
Tournament	2007	2008	2009	2010	2011	2012	2013	2014	2015	2016	2017	2018	2019	2020	2021	2022	SR	W–L	Win%
Grand Slam tournaments
Australian Open	A	A	A	A	A	A	QF	1R	A	A	1R	2R	1R	3R	1R	1R	0 / 8	6–8	43%
French Open	A	A	1R	1R	1R	1R	1R	1R	1R	1R	1R	2R	2R	2R	3R	2R	0 / 14	6–14	12%
Wimbledon	A	A	A	A	A	1R	1R	1R	1R	1R	A	1R	1R	NH	A	1R	0 / 8	0–8	0%
US Open	A	A	A	A	A	2R	A	A	1R	1R	1R	1R	1R	A	3R	A	0 / 7	3–7	30%
Win–loss	0–0	0–0	0–1	0–1	0–1	1–3	3–3	0–3	0–3	0–3	0–3	2–4	1–4	3–2	4–3	1–3	0 / 37	15–37	29%

== ATP Tour finals ==
=== Singles: 9 (3 titles, 6 runner-ups) ===
Legend Grand Slam tournaments (0–0) ATP World Tour Finals (0–0) ATP World Tour Masters 1000 (0–0) ATP World Tour 500 Series (0–1) ATP World Tour 250 Series (3–5)	Finals by surface Hard (0–5) Clay (3–1) Grass (0–0)	Finals by setting Outdoor (3–4) Indoor (0–2)

Result	W–L	Date	Tournament	Tier	Surface	Opponent	Score
Loss	0–1	May 2012	Serbia Open, Serbia	250 Series	Clay	(Italy) Andreas Seppi	3–6, 2–6
Loss	0–2	Feb 2013	Open Sud de France, France	250 Series	Hard (i)	(France) Richard Gasquet	2–6, 3–6
Win	1–2	Jul 2015	Swedish Open, Sweden	250 Series	Clay	(Spain) Tommy Robredo	7–6^{(9–7)}, 6–3
Loss	1–3	Oct 2015	Japan Open, Japan	500 Series	Hard	(Switzerland) Stan Wawrinka	2–6, 4–6
Loss	1–4	Sep 2017	Moselle Open, France	250 Series	Hard (i)	(Germany) Peter Gojowczyk	5–7, 2–6
Win	2–4	Apr 2019	Grand Prix Hassan II, Morocco	250 Series	Clay	(Spain) Pablo Andújar	6–2, 6–3
Win	3–4	May 2019	Lyon Open, France	250 Series	Clay	(Canada) Félix Auger-Aliassime	6–4, 6–3
Loss	3–5	Aug 2019	Winston-Salem Open, United States	250 Series	Hard	(Poland) Hubert Hurkacz	3–6, 6–3, 3–6
Loss	3–6	Jan 2020	Auckland Open, New Zealand	250 Series	Hard	(France) Ugo Humbert	6–7^{(2–7)}, 6–3, 6–7^{(5–7)}

=== Doubles: 4 (1 title, 3 runner-ups) ===
Legend Grand Slam tournaments (0–0) ATP World Tour Finals (0–0) ATP World Tour Masters 1000 (0–0) ATP World Tour 500 Series (0–0) ATP World Tour 250 Series (1–3)	Titles by surface Hard (1–1) Clay (0–2) Grass (0–0)	Titles by setting Outdoor (1–3) Indoor (0–0)

Result	W–L	Date	Tournament	Tier	Surface	Partner	Opponents	Score
Win	1–0	Jan 2013	Chennai Open, India	250 Series	Hard	(Switzerland) Stan Wawrinka	(Germany) Andre Begemann (Germany) Martin Emmrich	6–2, 6–1
Loss	1–1	Jan 2016	Chennai Open, India	250 Series	Hard	(United States) Austin Krajicek	(Austria) Oliver Marach (France) Fabrice Martin	3–6, 5–7
Loss	1–2	Apr 2018	Grand Prix Hassan II, Morocco	250 Series	Clay	(France) Édouard Roger-Vasselin	(Croatia) Nikola Mektić (Austria) Alexander Peya	5–7, 6–3, [7–10]
Loss	1–3	Feb 2021	Córdoba Open, Argentina	250 Series	Clay	(Monaco) Romain Arneodo	(Brazil) Rafael Matos (Brazil) Felipe Meligeni Alves	4–6, 1–6

== ATP Challenger and ITF Tour finals ==
=== Singles: 30 (14 titles, 16 runner-ups) ===
Legend (singles) ATP Challenger Tour (8–9) ITF Futures Tour (6–7)	Titles by surface Hard (9–3) Clay (5–11) Grass (0–1) Carpet (0–1)

Result	W–L	Date	Tournament	Tier	Surface	Opponent	Score
Win	1–0	Jul 2007	France F10, Bourg-en-Bresse	Futures	Clay	(France) Éric Prodon	2–6, 6–2, 6–3
Loss	1–1	Jun 2008	Italy F17, Bassano	Futures	Clay	(Italy) Patrick Prader	5–7, 3–6
Win	2–1	Jun 2009	Slovenia F3, Koper	Futures	Clay	(Austria) Marco Mirnegg	6–7^{(4–7)}, 6–4, 6–3
Loss	2–2	Jul 2009	Great Britain F8, Felixstowe	Futures	Grass	(Switzerland) Alexander Sadecky	1–6, 3–6
Loss	2–3	Aug 2009	Austria F7, St. Pölten	Futures	Clay	(Slovenia) Aljaž Bedene	4–6, 0–6
Loss	2–4	Sep 2009	Portugal F4, Porto	Futures	Clay	(United Kingdom) Daniel Smethurst	6–3, 4–6, 4–6
Loss	2–5	Oct 2009	Germany F18, Hambach	Futures	Carpet (i)	(Germany) Peter Gojowczyk	4–6, 4–6
Win	3–5	Jan 2010	USA F1, Plantation	Futures	Clay	(Austria) Marco Mirnegg	6–2, 6–7^{(10–12)}, 7–5
Win	4–5	Mar 2010	Portugal F1, Faro	Futures	Hard	(Romania) Adrian Cruciat	3–6, 6–4, 6–2
Loss	4–6	Mar 2010	Portugal F2, Lagos	Futures	Hard	(Spain) Guillermo Alcaide	4–6, 6–4, 3–6
Win	5–6	Mar 2010	Portugal F3, Albufeira	Futures	Hard	(Netherlands) Thomas Schoorel	7–6^{(7–5)}, 6–4
Loss	5–7	May 2010	Spain F14, Vic	Futures	Clay	(Spain) Sergio Gutiérrez Ferrol	6–2, 5–7, 5–7
Loss	5–8	Jun 2010	Arad, Romania	Challenger	Clay	(France) David Guez	3–6, 6–1, 3–6
Loss	5–9	Aug 2010	San Sebastián, Spain	Challenger	Clay	(Spain) Albert Ramos	4–6, 2–6
Loss	5–10	Mar 2011	Saint Brieuc, France	Challenger	Clay (i)	(France) Maxime Teixeira	3–6, 0–6
Win	6–10	Sep 2011	Brașov, Romania	Challenger	Clay	(France) Maxime Teixeira	6–4, 3–0 ret.
Win	7–10	Nov 2011	Salzburg, Austria	Challenger	Hard (i)	(Slovenia) Grega Žemlja	6–7^{(6–8)}, 6–4, 6–4
Win	8–10	Mar 2013	Le Gosier, Guadeloupe	Challenger	Hard	(Ukraine) Sergiy Stakhovsky	6–4, 5–7, 6–4
Win	9–10	Jan 2015	France F1, Bressuire	Futures	Hard (i)	(France) Maxime Teixeira	6–3, 0–6, 6–2
Win	10–10	Feb 2015	Bergamo, Italy	Challenger	Hard (i)	(Kazakhstan) Aleksandr Nedovyesov	6–3, 7–6^{(7–3)}
Loss	10–11	Mar 2015	Cherbourg, France	Challenger	Hard (i)	(Slovakia) Norbert Gombos	1–6, 6–7^{(4–7)}
Win	11–11	Mar 2015	Quimper, France	Challenger	Hard (i)	(France) Grégoire Barrère	6–4, 3–6, 6–4
Loss	11–12	Oct 2015	Brest, France	Challenger	Hard (i)	(Croatia) Ivan Dodig	5–7, 1–6
Win	12–12	Nov 2015	Mouilleron le Captif, France	Challenger	Hard (i)	(France) Lucas Pouille	6–4, 1–6, 7–6^{(9–7)}
Loss	12–13	Apr 2017	Sophia Antipolis, France	Challenger	Clay	(United Kingdom) Aljaž Bedene	2–6, 2–6
Loss	12–14	Mar 2019	Marbella, Spain	Challenger	Clay	(Spain) Pablo Andújar	6–4, 6–7^{(6–8)}, 4–6
Win	13–14	Mar 2023	Puerto Vallarta, Mexico	Challenger	Hard	(Japan) Yuta Shimizu	3–6, 6–0, 6–2
Loss	13–15	May 2023	Francavilla al Mare, Italy	Challenger	Clay	(Chile) Alejandro Tabilo	1–6, 5–7
Win	14–15	Jul 2023	San Benedetto, Italy	Challenger	Clay	(France) Richard Gasquet	4–6, 6–1, 6–1
Loss	14–16	Dec 2023	Maia, Portugal	Challenger	Clay (i)	(Portugal) Nuno Borges	1–6, 4–6

=== Doubles: 3 (1–2) ===
Legend (doubles) ATP Challenger Tour (0–2) ITF Futures Tour (1–0)	Titles by surface Hard (1–0) Clay (0–2) Grass (0–0) Carpet (0–0)

Result	W–L	Date	Tournament	Tier	Surface	Partner	Opponents	Score
Win	1–0	Mar 2010	Portugal F1, Faro	Futures	Hard	(France) Thomas Cazes-Carrère	(Poland) Piotr Gadomski (Poland) Mateusz Szmigiel	7–6^{(8–6)}, 7–6^{(7–3)}
Loss	1–1	Jul 2011	Orbetello, Italy	Challenger	Clay	(France) Romain Jouan	(Austria) Julian Knowle (Slovakia) Igor Zelenay	1–6, 6–7^{(2–7)}
Loss	1–2	Sep 2011	Brașov, Romania	Challenger	Clay	(Czech Republic) Dušan Lojda	(Romania) Victor-Mugurel Anagnastopol (Romania) Florin Mergea	2–6, 3–6

== Wins over top 10 players ==
- He has a 7–44 record against players who were ranked in the top 10 at the time the match was played.

#	Player	Rank	Tournament	Surface	Rd	Score	BPR
2013
1.	(Argentina) Juan Martín del Potro	7	Italian Open, Rome, Italy	Clay	3R	6–4, 7–6^{(7–3)}	36
2.	(Switzerland) Stan Wawrinka	10	Canadian Open, Montreal, Canada	Hard	2R	6–2, 7–6^{(7–2)}	29
2015
3.	(Japan) Kei Nishikori	4	US Open, United States	Hard	1R	6–4, 3–6, 4–6, 7–6^{(8–6)}, 6–4	41
4.	(Japan) Kei Nishikori	6	Tokyo, Japan	Hard	SF	1–6, 6–4, 6–2	21
2016
5.	(Switzerland) Stan Wawrinka	4	Marseilles, France	Hard (i)	QF	6–4, 1–6, 7–5	22
2017
6.	(Switzerland) Stan Wawrinka	3	Madrid Open, Spain	Clay	2R	7–5, 4–6, 6–2	44
2021
7.	(Canada) Denis Shapovalov	10	Cincinnati, United States	Hard	2R	6–3, 4–6, 7–5	50

Awards
Preceded by (Belgium) David Goffin	ATP Comeback Player of the Year; 2015	Succeeded by (Argentina) Juan Martín del Potro
