= 2023 HPP Open – Singles =

Singles
- 2023 HPP Open

Final
- Champion: (France) Corentin Moutet
- Runner-up: (India) Sumit Nagal
- Score: 6–3, 3–6, 6–2

Events
Singles	Doubles
← 2022 ·	HPP Open	· 2024 →

Leandro Riedi was the defending champion but lost in the first round to Damir Džumhur.

Corentin Moutet won the title after defeating Sumit Nagal 6–3, 3–6, 6–2 in the final.

== Seeds ==
1. (Czech Republic) Tomáš Macháč (first round, retired)
2. (Finland) Emil Ruusuvuori (quarterfinals, retired)
3. (Portugal) Nuno Borges (second round)
4. (France) Alexandre Müller (quarterfinals)
5. (Spain) Jaume Munar (quarterfinals)
6. (Italy) Flavio Cobolli (first round)
7. (France) Arthur Rinderknech (semifinals)
8. (United Kingdom) Liam Broady (first round)

== Draw ==
=== Key ===
- Q = Qualifier
- WC = Wild card
- LL = Lucky loser
- Alt = Alternate
- SE = Special exempt
- PR = Protected ranking
- ITF = ITF entry
- JE = Junior exempt
- w/o = Walkover
- r = Retired
- d = Defaulted
- SR = Special ranking

=== Finals ===
Semifinals
(France) Corentin Moutet	5	7	6
7	(France) Arthur Rinderknech	7	5	3
LL	(Italy) Stefano Travaglia	1	4
Alt	(India) Sumit Nagal	6	6

Final
(France) Corentin Moutet	6	3	6
Alt	(India) Sumit Nagal	3	6	2

=== Top half ===
First round
1	(Czech Republic) T Macháč	6	1^{r}
SE	(Switzerland) A Bellier	4	4
(United States) M Cressy	4	2
(France) C Moutet	6	6
Q	(Ukraine) O Krutykh	6^{7}	5
Q	(Austria) M Neuchrist	7^{9}	7
WC	(Finland) Patrick Kaukovalta	5	4
5	(Spain) J Munar	7	6
4	(France) A Müller	6	6
WC	(Finland) E Vasa	4	3
Q	(Italy) F Maestrelli	1	3
WC	(Estonia) M Lajal	6	6
(Switzerland) L Riedi	6	4	3
(Bosnia and Herzegovina) D Džumhur	3	6	6
(Italy) A Vavassori	4	6^{3}
7	(France) A Rinderknech	6	7^{7}

Second round
SE	(Switzerland) A Bellier	4	4
(France) C Moutet	6	6
Q	(Austria) M Neuchrist	2	6^{3}
5	(Spain) J Munar	6	7^{7}
4	(France) A Müller	6	0	6
WC	(Estonia) M Lajal	1	6	1
(Bosnia and Herzegovina) D Džumhur	5	2
7	(France) A Rinderknech	7	6

Quarterfinals
(France) C Moutet	6	7^{7}
5	(Spain) J Munar	2	6^{2}
4	(France) A Müller	7^{9}	3	1
7	(France) A Rinderknech	6^{7}	6	6

Semifinals
(France) C Moutet	5	7	6
7	(France) A Rinderknech	7	5	3

=== Bottom half ===
First round
8	(United Kingdom) L Broady	4	2
LL	(Italy) S Travaglia	6	6
Q	(Kazakhstan) D Yevseyev	7	6
(Finland) O Virtanen	5	3
(Moldova) R Albot	6	6
Q	A Kachmazov	2	1
(Belgium) D Goffin	3	6	3
3	(Portugal) N Borges	6	3	6
6	(Italy) F Cobolli	5	6^{6}
(Czech Republic) J Menšík	7	7^{8}
Q	(Austria) D Novak	2	3
Alt	(India) S Nagal	6	6
(Italy) M Bellucci	0	6	1
(Slovakia) A Molčan	6	2	6
(Belgium) J De Loore	6	0	1
2	(Finland) E Ruusuvuori	4	6	6

Second round
LL	(Italy) S Travaglia	6	6
Q	(Kazakhstan) D Yevseyev	3	0
(Moldova) R Albot	6	1	6
3	(Portugal) N Borges	4	6	4
(Czech Republic) J Menšík	5	2
Alt	(India) S Nagal	7	6
(Slovakia) A Molčan	2	5
2	(Finland) E Ruusuvuori	6	7

Quarterfinals
LL	(Italy) S Travaglia	6	3	7
(Moldova) R Albot	4	6	5
Alt	(India) S Nagal	6	3
2	(Finland) E Ruusuvuori	3	1^{r}

Semifinals
LL	(Italy) S Travaglia	1	4
Alt	(India) S Nagal	6	6
