= 2025 HPP Open – Singles =

Singles
- 2025 HPP Open

Final
- Champion: (United States) Patrick Kypson
- Runner-up: (Finland) Otto Virtanen
- Score: 4–6, 6–3, 6–4

Events
Singles	Doubles
← 2024 ·	HPP Open	· 2026 →

Kei Nishikori was the defending champion but chose not to defend his title.

Patrick Kypson won the title after defeating Otto Virtanen 4–6, 6–3, 6–4 in the final.

== Seeds ==
1. (Croatia) Marin Čilić (quarterfinals)
2. (Italy) Luca Nardi (quarterfinals)
3. (United States) Brandon Holt (first round)
4. (Serbia) Dušan Lajović (first round)
5. (United States) Patrick Kypson (champion)
6. (Finland) Otto Virtanen (final)
7. (Italy) Giulio Zeppieri (quarterfinals)
8. (Croatia) Luka Mikrut (first round)

== Draw ==
Key

- Q = Qualifier
- WC = Wild card
- LL = Lucky loser
- Alt = Alternate
- ITF = ITF entry
- PR = Protected ranking
- SR = Special ranking
- SE = Special exempt
- JE = Junior exempt
- JR = Junior Accelerator Programme entrant
- CO = College Accelerator Programme entrant
- NG = Next Gen Accelerator Program entrant
- w/o = Walkover
- r = Retired
- d = Defaulted

=== Finals ===
Semifinals
6	(Finland) Otto Virtanen	6	6
Q	(France) Sascha Gueymard Wayenburg	2	4
5	(United States) Patrick Kypson	7^{7}	3	6
(Italy) Stefano Travaglia	6^{5}	6	2

Final
6	(Finland) Otto Virtanen	6	3	4
5	(United States) Patrick Kypson	4	6	6

=== Top half ===
First round
1	(Croatia) M Čilić	6	7
(Lebanon) B Hassan	4	5
PR	(Italy) S Napolitano	6	6^{3}	6
(Canada) A Galarneau	2	7^{7}	4
WC	(Finland) E Ruusuvuori	6	7^{7}
(Austria) L Neumayer	4	6^{3}
(Belgium) G Onclin	1	6^{6}
6	(Finland) O Virtanen	6	7^{8}
4	(Serbia) D Lajović	3	6^{3}
Q	(Croatia) M Dodig	6	7^{7}
Q	(France) S Gueymard Wayenburg	3	7^{7}	6
(Croatia) B Gojo	6	6^{2}	4
(Luxembourg) C Rodesch	6	6^{3}	6
(Germany) J Engel	4	7^{7}	4
WC	(Finland) O Paldanius	6^{2}	2
7	(Italy) G Zeppieri	7^{7}	6

Second round
1	(Croatia) M Čilić	6	4	7
PR	(Italy) S Napolitano	2	6	5
WC	(Finland) E Ruusuvuori	4	2
6	(Finland) O Virtanen	6	6
Q	(Croatia) M Dodig	4	2
Q	(France) S Gueymard Wayenburg	6	6
(Luxembourg) C Rodesch	6	2	3
7	(Italy) G Zeppieri	4	6	6

Quarterfinals
1	(Croatia) M Čilić	5	4
6	(Finland) O Virtanen	7	6
Q	(France) S Gueymard Wayenburg	6	7
7	(Italy) G Zeppieri	3	5

Semifinals
6	(Finland) O Virtanen	6	6
Q	(France) S Gueymard Wayenburg	2	4

=== Bottom half ===
First round
5	(United States) P Kypson	5	6	6
Q	(France) G Blancaneaux	7	1	3
(Bosnia and Herzegovina) N Fatić	3	6^{4}
(France) C Hemery	6	7^{7}
SE	(Italy) L Giustino	6	6
SE	(France) T Droguet	2	4
(Belgium) K Coppejans	6	3	7
3	(United States) B Holt	4	6	5
8	(Croatia) L Mikrut	5	1
WC	(Finland) E Vasa	7	6
(Italy) S Travaglia	6	6
Q	(United Kingdom) S Parker	3	4
Q	(Norway) V Durasovic	7^{8}	6
(Italy) F Cinà	6^{6}	4
Q	(Lithuania) E Butvilas	4	2
2	(Italy) L Nardi	6	6

Second round
5	(United States) P Kypson	3	6	7^{7}
(France) C Hemery	6	2	6^{5}
SE	(Italy) L Giustino	7^{7}	7^{7}
(Belgium) K Coppejans	6^{5}	6^{5}
WC	(Finland) E Vasa	4	7	5
(Italy) S Travaglia	6	5	7
Q	(Norway) V Durasovic	2	2
2	(Italy) L Nardi	6	6

Quarterfinals
5	(United States) P Kypson	6	6
SE	(Italy) L Giustino	4	2
(Italy) S Travaglia	6	1	6
2	(Italy) L Nardi	2	6	1

Semifinals
5	(United States) P Kypson	7^{7}	3	6
(Italy) S Travaglia	6^{5}	6	2
