= 2022 HPP Open – Doubles =

Doubles
- 2022 HPP Open

Final
- Champions: (India) Purav Raja (India) Divij Sharan
- Runners-up: (United States) Reese Stalder (Greece) Petros Tsitsipas
- Score: 6–7^{(5–7)}, 6–3, [10–8]

Events
Singles	Doubles
← 2021 ·	HPP Open	· 2023 →

Alexander Erler and Lucas Miedler were the defending champions but lost in the semifinals to Reese Stalder and Petros Tsitsipas.

Purav Raja and Divij Sharan won the title after defeating Stalder and Tsitsipas 6–7^{(5–7)}, 6–3, [10–8] in the final.

== Seeds ==
1. (Austria) Alexander Erler / (Austria) Lucas Miedler (semifinals)
2. (Serbia) Ivan Sabanov / (Serbia) Matej Sabanov (quarterfinals)
3. (United States) Reese Stalder / (Greece) Petros Tsitsipas (final)
4. (India) Purav Raja / (India) Divij Sharan (champions)

== Draw ==
=== Key ===
- Q = Qualifier
- WC = Wild card
- LL = Lucky loser
- Alt = Alternate
- ITF = ITF entry
- PR = Protected ranking
- SR = Special ranking
- SE = Special exempt
- JE = Junior exempt
- JR = Junior Accelerator Programme entrant
- CO = College Accelerator Programme entrant
- NG = Next Gen Accelerator Program entrant
- w/o = Walkover
- r = Retired
- d = Defaulted

First round
WC	(Finland) Linus Lagerbohm (Finland) Jami Savolainen	0	2
(Poland) Ł Kubot (Poland) S Walków	6	6
3	(United States) R Stalder (Greece) Pe Tsitsipas	6	6
(Germany) M Marterer (Ukraine) V Sachko	3	3
(Belgium) Z Bergs (Switzerland) A Ritschard	7	3	[8]
(Norway) V Durasovic (Finland) P Niklas-Salminen	5	6	[10]
(Sweden) F Bergevi (Germany) Niklas Schell	4	5
(Finland) E Vasa (Finland) O Virtanen	6	7
WC	(Finland) Patrick Kaukovalta (Finland) Otso Martikainen	6^{4}	1
4	(India) P Raja (India) D Sharan	7^{7}	6
(United Kingdom) J Clarke (United Kingdom) J Paris	7^{7}	3	[10]
A Kachmazov; P Kotov	6^{5}	6	[12]
(Estonia) M Lajal (Estonia) Karl Kiur Saar	2	3
2	(Serbia) I Sabanov (Serbia) M Sabanov	6	6

Quarterfinals
1	(Austria) A Erler (Austria) L Miedler	6	6
(Poland) Ł Kubot (Poland) S Walków	3	1
3	(United States) R Stalder (Greece) Pe Tsitsipas	6^{2}	7^{7}	[10]
(Norway) V Durasovic (Finland) P Niklas-Salminen	7^{7}	6^{2}	[7]
(Finland) E Vasa (Finland) O Virtanen	6	4	[6]
4	(India) P Raja (India) D Sharan	3	6	[10]
A Kachmazov; P Kotov	2	6	[10]
2	(Serbia) I Sabanov (Serbia) M Sabanov	6	1	[6]

Semifinals
1	(Austria) A Erler (Austria) L Miedler	6	4	[3]
3	(United States) R Stalder (Greece) Pe Tsitsipas	3	6	[10]
4	(India) P Raja (India) D Sharan	6	6
A Kachmazov; P Kotov	3	2

Final
3	(United States) R Stalder (Greece) Pe Tsitsipas	7^{7}	3	[8]
4	(India) P Raja (India) D Sharan	6^{5}	6	[10]
