= 2025 HPP Open – Doubles =

Doubles
- 2025 HPP Open

Final
- Champions: (Germany) Jakob Schnaitter (Germany) Mark Wallner
- Runners-up: (Romania) Alexandru Jecan (Romania) Bogdan Pavel
- Score: 6–2, 4–6, [10–6]

Events
Singles	Doubles
- HPP Open

Filip Bergevi and Mick Veldheer were the defending champions but chose not to defend their title.

Jakob Schnaitter and Mark Wallner won the title after defeating Alexandru Jecan and Bogdan Pavel 6–2, 4–6, [10–6] in the final.

== Seeds ==
1. (Germany) Jakob Schnaitter / (Germany) Mark Wallner (champions)
2. (United Kingdom) Joshua Paris / (United Kingdom) Marcus Willis (quarterfinals)
3. (Spain) Íñigo Cervantes / (Israel) Daniel Cukierman (quarterfinals)
4. (India) Vijay Sundar Prashanth / (Poland) Szymon Walków (first round)

== Draw ==
Key

- Q = Qualifier
- WC = Wild card
- LL = Lucky loser
- Alt = Alternate
- ITF = ITF entry
- PR = Protected ranking
- SR = Special ranking
- SE = Special exempt
- JE = Junior exempt
- JR = Junior Accelerator Programme entrant
- CO = College Accelerator Programme entrant
- NG = Next Gen Accelerator Program entrant
- w/o = Walkover
- r = Retired
- d = Defaulted

First round
1	(Germany) J Schnaitter (Germany) M Wallner	6	6
I Liutarevich (Italy) G Ricca	2	4
WC	(Finland) Patrick Kaukovalta (Finland) E Vasa	3	4
(Poland) S Kielan (Poland) F Pieczonka	6	6
3	(Spain) Í Cervantes (Israel) D Cukierman	6	6
(Spain) B Pujol Navarro (Spain) D Vega Hernández	3	4
(France) G Blancaneaux (France) C Hemery	2	0^{r}
WC	(Finland) Linus Lagerbohm (Finland) O Virtanen	6	2
(Czech Republic) Jiří Barnat (Czech Republic) F Duda	3	4
(Romania) A Jecan (Romania) B Pavel	6	6
Alt	(Croatia) M Dodig (Croatia) L Mikrut	7^{7}	6
4	(India) VS Prashanth (Poland) S Walków	6^{5}	1
(Romania) V Cornea (Croatia) N Serdarušić	7^{7}	6
(France) A Reymond (France) L Sanchez	6^{4}	4
(Slovakia) M Karol (Finland) P Niklas-Salminen	3	3
2	(United Kingdom) J Paris (United Kingdom) M Willis	6	6

Quarterfinals
1	(Germany) J Schnaitter (Germany) M Wallner	7^{7}	7^{8}
(Poland) S Kielan (Poland) F Pieczonka	6^{4}	6^{6}
3	(Spain) Í Cervantes (Israel) D Cukierman	6	3	[5]
WC	(Finland) L Lagerbohm (Finland) O Virtanen	3	6	[10]
(Romania) A Jecan (Romania) B Pavel	w/o
Alt	(Croatia) M Dodig (Croatia) L Mikrut
(Romania) V Cornea (Croatia) N Serdarušić	6^{3}	7^{7}	[11]
2	(United Kingdom) J Paris (United Kingdom) M Willis	7^{7}	6^{5}	[9]

Semifinals
1	(Germany) J Schnaitter (Germany) M Wallner	w/o
WC	(Finland) L Lagerbohm (Finland) O Virtanen
(Romania) A Jecan (Romania) B Pavel	7	4	[11]
(Romania) V Cornea (Croatia) N Serdarušić	5	6	[9]

Final
1	(Germany) J Schnaitter (Germany) M Wallner	6	4	[10]
(Romania) A Jecan (Romania) B Pavel	2	6	[6]
