= 2023 HPP Open – Doubles =

Doubles
- 2023 HPP Open

Final
- Champions: (India) Sriram Balaji (Germany) Andre Begemann
- Runners-up: (India) Jeevan Nedunchezhiyan (India) Vijay Sundar Prashanth
- Score: 6–2, 7–5

Events
Singles	Doubles
← 2022 ·	HPP Open	· 2024 →

Purav Raja and Divij Sharan were the defending champions but chose not to defend their title.

Sriram Balaji and Andre Begemann won the title after defeating Jeevan Nedunchezhiyan and Vijay Sundar Prashanth 6–2, 7–5 in the final.

== Seeds ==
1. (Italy) Andrea Pellegrino / (Italy) Andrea Vavassori (quarterfinals)
2. (India) Jeevan Nedunchezhiyan / (India) Vijay Sundar Prashanth (final)
3. (Pakistan) Aisam-ul-Haq Qureshi / (Greece) Petros Tsitsipas (first round)
4. (Finland) Patrik Niklas-Salminen / (Czech Republic) Petr Nouza (quarterfinals)

== Draw ==
=== Key ===
- Q = Qualifier
- WC = Wild card
- LL = Lucky loser
- Alt = Alternate
- ITF = ITF entry
- PR = Protected ranking
- SR = Special ranking
- SE = Special exempt
- JE = Junior exempt
- JR = Junior Accelerator Programme entrant
- CO = College Accelerator Programme entrant
- NG = Next Gen Accelerator Program entrant
- w/o = Walkover
- r = Retired
- d = Defaulted

First round
1	(Italy) A Pellegrino (Italy) A Vavassori	6	6
(Finland) Patrick Kaukovalta (Finland) E Vasa	4	3
PR	(India) S Balaji (Germany) A Begemann	6	6
(Austria) M Neuchrist (Austria) D Novak	4	3
3	(Pakistan) A-u-H Qureshi (Greece) Pe Tsitsipas	6	1	[5]
(United States) V Kirkov; I Liutarevich	2	6	[10]
WC	(Finland) Otso Martikainen (Finland) O Paldanius	4	2
(United Kingdom) L Johnson (Tunisia) S Mansouri	6	6
(United States) M Cressy (Finland) O Virtanen	6	7^{7}
(United Kingdom) J Paris (Poland) S Walków	3	6^{4}
(Italy) M Bellucci (Italy) S Travaglia	3	7^{7}	[6]
4	(Finland) P Niklas-Salminen (Czech Republic) P Nouza	6	6^{2}	[10]
(Italy) M Bortolotti (Spain) S Martos Gornés	6	6
(United States) N Chappell (Greece) S Sakellaridis	4	2
WC	(Finland) Linus Lagerbohm (Estonia) M Lajal	2	6^{5}
2	(India) J Nedunchezhiyan (India) VS Prashanth	6	7^{7}

Quarterfinals
1	(Italy) A Pellegrino (Italy) A Vavassori	7^{7}	4	[9]
PR	(India) S Balaji (Germany) A Begemann	6^{3}	6	[11]
(United States) V Kirkov; I Liutarevich	2	4
(United Kingdom) L Johnson (Tunisia) S Mansouri	6	6
(United States) M Cressy (Finland) O Virtanen	7^{7}	5	[11]
4	(Finland) P Niklas-Salminen (Czech Republic) P Nouza	6^{1}	7	[9]
(Italy) M Bortolotti (Spain) S Martos Gornés	1	0
2	(India) J Nedunchezhiyan (India) VS Prashanth	6	6

Semifinals
PR	(India) S Balaji (Germany) A Begemann	6^{4}	6	[10]
(United Kingdom) L Johnson (Tunisia) S Mansouri	7^{7}	4	[8]
(United States) M Cressy (Finland) O Virtanen	3	4
2	(India) J Nedunchezhiyan (India) VS Prashanth	6	6

Final
PR	(India) S Balaji (Germany) A Begemann	6	7
2	(India) J Nedunchezhiyan (India) VS Prashanth	2	5
