= 2021 Tali Open – Doubles =

Doubles
- 2021 Tali Open

Final
- Champions: (Austria) Alexander Erler (Austria) Lucas Miedler
- Runners-up: (Finland) Harri Heliövaara (Netherlands) Jean-Julien Rojer
- Score: 6–3, 7–6^{(7–2)}

Events
Singles	Doubles
← 2019 ·	Tali Open	· 2022 →

Frederik Nielsen and Tim Pütz were the defending champions but chose not to defend their title.

Alexander Erler and Lucas Miedler won the title after defeating Harri Heliövaara and Jean-Julien Rojer 6–3, 7–6^{(7–2)} in the final.

== Seeds ==
1. (Finland) Harri Heliövaara / (Netherlands) Jean-Julien Rojer (final)
2. (Czech Republic) Roman Jebavý / (United Kingdom) Jonny O'Mara (first round)
3. (Serbia) Ivan Sabanov / (Serbia) Matej Sabanov (first round)
4. (Spain) Sergio Martos Gornés / (India) Ramkumar Ramanathan (first round)

== Draw ==
=== Key ===
- Q = Qualifier
- WC = Wild card
- LL = Lucky loser
- Alt = Alternate
- SE = Special exempt
- PR = Protected ranking
- ITF = ITF entry
- JE = Junior exempt
- w/o = Walkover
- r = Retired
- d = Defaulted
- SR = Special ranking

First round
1	(Finland) H Heliövaara (Netherlands) J-J Rojer	6	6
(Bosnia and Herzegovina) D Džumhur (Serbia) N Milojević	0	3
(Ecuador) D Hidalgo (Ecuador) R Quiroz	7^{8}	5	[10]
PR	(Belgium) K Coppejans (Belgium) J De Loore	6^{6}	7	[12]
3	(Serbia) I Sabanov (Serbia) M Sabanov	4	6	[7]
PR	(Uzbekistan) D Istomin (Zimbabwe) CJ Lock	6	4	[10]
WC	(Norway) V Durasovic (Finland) P Niklas-Salminen	2	4
(India) S Balaji (India) D Sharan	6	6
(Uzbekistan) S Fayziev (Greece) M Kalovelonis	6	6
(Peru) S Galdós (Ecuador) E Gómez	2	2
(Austria) A Erler (Austria) L Miedler	7	6
4	(Spain) S Martos Gornés (India) R Ramanathan	5	3
PR	(Japan) T Matsui (Japan) K Uesugi	4	4
WC	(Finland) E Vasa (Finland) Iiro Vasa	6	6
WC	(Finland) O Virtanen (Estonia) J Zopp	6	6
2	(Czech Republic) R Jebavý (United Kingdom) J O'Mara	4	4

Quarterfinals
1	(Finland) H Heliövaara (Netherlands) J-J Rojer	6	6
PR	(Belgium) K Coppejans (Belgium) J De Loore	4	3
PR	(Uzbekistan) D Istomin (Zimbabwe) CJ Lock	5	2
(India) S Balaji (India) D Sharan	7	6
(Uzbekistan) S Fayziev (Greece) M Kalovelonis	3	6^{3}
(Austria) A Erler (Austria) L Miedler	6	7^{7}
WC	(Finland) E Vasa (Finland) I Vasa	4	2
WC	(Finland) O Virtanen (Estonia) J Zopp	6	6

Semifinals
1	(Finland) H Heliövaara (Netherlands) J-J Rojer	6	6
(India) S Balaji (India) D Sharan	4	2
(Austria) A Erler (Austria) L Miedler	7^{7}	6
WC	(Finland) O Virtanen (Estonia) J Zopp	6^{3}	4

Final
1	(Finland) H Heliövaara (Netherlands) J-J Rojer	3	6^{2}
(Austria) A Erler (Austria) L Miedler	6	7^{7}
