= 2024 Davis Cup qualifying round =

Men's tennis tournament qualifiers

The 2024 Davis Cup qualifying round was held from 1 to 4 February 2024. The twelve winners of this round qualified for the 2024 Davis Cup Finals while the twelve losers will play at the 2024 Davis Cup World Group I.

== Teams ==
Twenty-four teams played for twelve spots in the finals, in series decided on a home and away basis.

These twenty-four teams were:

- 12 teams ranked 3rd–16th in the 2023 Finals except the 2 wild card teams
- 12 winning teams from the 2023 World Group I

The 12 winning teams from the qualifying round will play at the Finals and the 12 losing teams will play at the World Group I.

#: Nations Ranking as of 27 November 2023.

Seeded teams

1. Canada (#2)
2. Serbia (#5)
3. Croatia (#6)
4. Germany (#8)
5. Netherlands (#9)
6. Czech Republic (#10)
7. United States (#11)
8. Finland (#12)
9. France (#13)
10. Kazakhstan (#14)
11. Sweden (#15)
12. Chile (#16)

Unseeded teams

- Belgium (#17)
- South Korea (#18)
- Argentina (#19)
- Switzerland (#21)
- Hungary (#22)
- Slovakia (#23)
- Brazil (#25)
- Portugal (#26)
- Israel (#31)
- Chinese Taipei (#32)
- Peru (#34)
- Ukraine (#35)

== Results summary ==
Home team	Score	Away team	Location	Venue	Surface
Canada [1]	3–1	South Korea	Montreal	IGA Stadium	Hard (i)
Serbia [2]	0–4	Slovakia	Kraljevo	Kraljevo Sports Hall	Clay (i)
Croatia [3]	1–3	Belgium	Varaždin	Varaždin Arena	Hard (i)
Hungary	2–3	Germany [4]	Tatabánya	Multifunctional Arena	Hard (i)
Netherlands [5]	3–2	Switzerland	Groningen	MartiniPlaza	Hard (i)
Czech Republic [6]	4–0	Israel	Třinec	Vitality Slezsko	Hard (i)
Ukraine	0–4	United States [7]	Vilnius (Lithuania)	SEB Arena	Hard (i)
Finland [8]	3–1	Portugal	Turku	Gatorade Center	Hard (i)
Chinese Taipei	0–4	France [9]	Taipei	Taipei Tennis Center	Hard (i)
Argentina	3–2	Kazakhstan [10]	Rosario	Jockey Club de Rosario	Clay
Sweden [11]	1–3	Brazil	Helsingborg	Helsingborg Arena	Hard (i)
Chile [12]	3–2	Peru	Santiago	Estadio Nacional	Hard

== Results ==
=== Canada vs. South Korea ===
Canada
3
IGA Stadium, Montreal, Canada
2–3 February 2024
Hard (i)

South Korea
1

			1	2	3
1	(Canada) (South Korea)	Gabriel Diallo; Kwon Soon-woo	6; 4	6; 4
2	(Canada) (South Korea)	Vasek Pospisil; Hong Seong-chan	6; 4	6; 3
3	(Canada) (South Korea)	Alexis Galarneau / Vasek Pospisil; Nam Ji-sung / Song Min-kyu	4; 6	7^{7} 6^{4}	3; 6
4	(Canada) (South Korea)	Gabriel Diallo; Hong Seong-chan	7; 5	4; 6	6; 1
5	(Canada) (South Korea)	Vasek Pospisil; Kwon Soon-woo				not played

=== Serbia vs. Slovakia ===
Serbia
0
Kraljevo Sports Hall, Kraljevo, Serbia
2–3 February 2024
Clay (i)

Slovakia
4

			1	2	3
1	(Serbia) (Slovakia)	Miomir Kecmanović; Lukáš Klein	6^{2} 7^{7}	2; 6
2	(Serbia) (Slovakia)	Dušan Lajović; Alex Molčan	6; 4	2; 6	0; 6
3	(Serbia) (Slovakia)	Nikola Ćaćić / Miomir Kecmanović; Lukáš Klein / Igor Zelenay	6^{4} 7^{7}	3; 6
4	(Serbia) (Slovakia)	Laslo Djere; Lukáš Pokorný	3; 4			retired
5	(Serbia) (Slovakia)	Dušan Lajović; Lukáš Klein				not played

=== Croatia vs. Belgium ===
Croatia
1
Varaždin Arena, Varaždin, Croatia
3–4 February 2024
Hard (i)

Belgium
3

			1	2	3
1	(Croatia) (Belgium)	Marin Čilić; Zizou Bergs	4; 6	6; 4	4; 6
2	(Croatia) (Belgium)	Duje Ajduković; Joris De Loore	6; 1	6; 4
3	(Croatia) (Belgium)	Ivan Dodig / Mate Pavić; Sander Gillé / Joran Vliegen	6; 2	3; 6	6^{4} 7^{7}
4	(Croatia) (Belgium)	Duje Ajduković; Zizou Bergs	1; 6	5; 7
5	(Croatia) (Belgium)	Marin Čilić; Joris De Loore				not played

=== Hungary vs. Germany ===
Hungary
2
Multifunctional Arena, Tatabánya, Hungary
2–3 February 2024
Hard (i)

Germany
3

			1	2	3
1	(Hungary) (Germany)	Fábián Marozsán; Dominik Koepfer	2; 6	6^{4} 7^{7}
2	(Hungary) (Germany)	Márton Fucsovics; Jan-Lennard Struff	6; 3	7; 5
3	(Hungary) (Germany)	Fábián Marozsán / Máté Valkusz; Kevin Krawietz / Tim Pütz	3; 6	6^{3} 7^{7}
4	(Hungary) (Germany)	Máté Valkusz; Jan-Lennard Struff	3; 6	2; 6
5	(Hungary) (Germany)	Zsombor Piros; Kevin Krawietz	7^{7} 6^{2}	6; 3

=== Netherlands vs. Switzerland ===
Netherlands
3
MartiniPlaza, Groningen, Netherlands
2–3 February 2024
Hard (i)

Switzerland
2

			1	2	3
1	(Netherlands) (Switzerland)	Tallon Griekspoor; Marc-Andrea Hüsler	7^{7} 6^{3}	7^{7} 6^{3}
2	(Netherlands) (Switzerland)	Botic van de Zandschulp; Leandro Riedi	4; 6	6^{3} 7^{7}
3	(Netherlands) (Switzerland)	Wesley Koolhof / Jean-Julien Rojer; Marc-Andrea Hüsler / Leandro Riedi	6^{5} 7^{7}	6^{2} 7^{7}
4	(Netherlands) (Switzerland)	Tallon Griekspoor; Leandro Riedi	7^{8} 6^{6}	7^{7} 6^{3}
5	(Netherlands) (Switzerland)	Botic van de Zandschulp; Marc-Andrea Hüsler	5; 7	7^{7} 6^{5}	6; 3

=== Czech Republic vs. Israel ===
Czech Republic
4
Vitality Slezsko, Třinec, Czech Republic
3–4 February 2024
Hard (i)

Israel
0

			1	2	3
1	(Czech Republic) (Israel)	Jakub Menšík; Yshai Oliel	6; 1	7^{7} 6^{4}
2	(Czech Republic) (Israel)	Jiří Lehečka; Daniel Cukierman	6; 1	7^{7} 6^{2}
3	(Czech Republic) (Israel)	Tomáš Macháč / Adam Pavlásek; Daniel Cukierman / Edan Leshem	4; 1			retired
4	(Czech Republic) (Israel)	Vít Kopřiva; Orel Kimhi	3; 6	6; 3	11; 9
5	(Czech Republic) (Israel)	Jakub Menšík; Daniel Cukierman				not played

=== Ukraine vs. United States ===
Ukraine
0
SEB Arena, Vilnius, Lithuania
1–2 February 2024
Hard (i)

United States
4

			1	2	3
1	(Ukraine) (United States)	Oleksii Krutykh; Sebastian Korda	3; 6	7^{7} 6^{3}	4; 6
2	(Ukraine) (United States)	Viacheslav Bielinskyi; Christopher Eubanks	3; 6	2; 6
3	(Ukraine) (United States)	Illya Beloborodko / Oleksii Krutykh; Austin Krajicek / Rajeev Ram	3; 6	6; 4	3; 6
4	(Ukraine) (United States)	Vladyslav Orlov; Taylor Fritz	3; 6	4; 6
5	(Ukraine) (United States)	Viacheslav Bielinskyi; Sebastian Korda				not played

=== Finland vs. Portugal ===
Finland
3
Gatorade Center, Turku, Finland
2–3 February 2024
Hard (i)

Portugal
1

			1	2	3
1	(Finland) (Portugal)	Otto Virtanen; Nuno Borges	6; 2	6; 1
2	(Finland) (Portugal)	Emil Ruusuvuori; João Sousa	6; 2	6; 3
3	(Finland) (Portugal)	Harri Heliövaara / Emil Ruusuvuori; Nuno Borges / Francisco Cabral	6; 4	7^{8} 6^{6}
4	(Finland) (Portugal)	Eero Vasa; Henrique Rocha	4; 6	5; 7
5	(Finland) (Portugal)	Otto Virtanen; João Sousa				not played

=== Chinese Taipei vs. France ===
Chinese Taipei
0
Taipei Tennis Center, Taipei, Chinese Taipei
3–4 February 2024
Hard (i)

France
4

			1	2	3
1	(Chinese Taipei) (France)	Hsu Yu-hsiou; Luca Van Assche	4; 6	4; 6
2	(Chinese Taipei) (France)	Wu Tung-lin; Adrian Mannarino	3; 6	5; 7
3	(Chinese Taipei) (France)	Hsu Yu-hsiou / Jason Jung; Nicolas Mahut / Édouard Roger-Vasselin	6; 3	2; 6	6^{1} 7^{7}
4	(Chinese Taipei) (France)	Tseng Chun-hsin; Quentin Halys	3; 6	6^{3} 7^{7}
5	(Chinese Taipei) (France)	Wu Tung-lin; Luca Van Assche				not played

=== Argentina vs. Kazakhstan ===
Argentina
3
Jockey Club de Rosario, Rosario, Argentina
3–4 February 2024
Clay

Kazakhstan
2

			1	2	3
1	(Argentina) (Kazakhstan)	Francisco Cerúndolo; Dmitry Popko	7; 5	6; 2
2	(Argentina) (Kazakhstan)	Tomás Martín Etcheverry; Timofey Skatov	4; 6	5; 7
3	(Argentina) (Kazakhstan)	Máximo González / Andrés Molteni; Aleksandr Nedovyesov / Dmitry Popko	6^{3} 7^{7}	6; 4	6; 0
4	(Argentina) (Kazakhstan)	Francisco Cerúndolo; Timofey Skatov	6^{1} 7^{7}	4; 6
5	(Argentina) (Kazakhstan)	Sebastián Báez; Dmitry Popko	6; 4	3; 6	7^{8} 6^{6}

=== Sweden vs. Brazil ===
Sweden
1
Helsingborg Arena, Helsingborg, Sweden
2–3 February 2024
Hard (i)

Brazil
3

			1	2	3
1	(Sweden) (Brazil)	Karl Friberg; Thiago Monteiro	3; 6	6^{5} 7^{7}
2	(Sweden) (Brazil)	Elias Ymer; Gustavo Heide	4; 6	6; 1	6; 3
3	(Sweden) (Brazil)	Filip Bergevi / André Göransson; Rafael Matos / Felipe Meligeni Alves	2; 6	5; 7
4	(Sweden) (Brazil)	Elias Ymer; Thiago Monteiro	6; 4	4; 6	2; 6
5	(Sweden) (Brazil)	Karl Friberg; Gustavo Heide				not played

=== Chile vs. Peru ===
Chile
3
Estadio Nacional, Santiago, Chile
3–4 February 2024
Hard

Peru
2

			1	2	3
1	(Chile) (Peru)	Alejandro Tabilo; Juan Pablo Varillas	4; 6	6; 2	6; 1
2	(Chile) (Peru)	Nicolás Jarry; Ignacio Buse	2; 6	6; 2	3; 6
3	(Chile) (Peru)	Tomás Barrios Vera / Alejandro Tabilo; Arklon Huertas del Pino / Conner Huertas del Pino	5; 7	3; 6
4	(Chile) (Peru)	Nicolás Jarry; Juan Pablo Varillas	6; 2	6; 4
5	(Chile) (Peru)	Alejandro Tabilo; Ignacio Buse	2; 6	6; 3	6; 2
