= 2026 HPP Open – Singles =

Singles
- 2026 HPP Open

Final
- Champion: (United Kingdom) Toby Samuel
- Runner-up: (Finland) Otto Virtanen
- Score: 7–6^{(7–3)}, 6–2

Events
Singles	Doubles
- HPP Open

Patrick Kypson was the defending champion but chose not to defend his title.

Toby Samuel won the title after defeating Otto Virtanen 7–6^{(7–3)}, 6–2 in the final.

== Seeds ==
1. (Australia) James Duckworth (first round)
2. (United Kingdom) Jacob Fearnley (second round)
3. (United Kingdom) Toby Samuel (champion)
4. (Czech Republic) Dalibor Svrčina (quarterfinals)
5. (Austria) Jurij Rodionov (second round)
6. (United States) Nishesh Basavareddy (semifinals)
7. (Finland) Otto Virtanen (final)
8. (Japan) Shintaro Mochizuki (first round)

== Draw ==
Key

- Q = Qualifier
- WC = Wild card
- LL = Lucky loser
- Alt = Alternate
- ITF = ITF entry
- PR = Protected ranking
- SR = Special ranking
- SE = Special exempt
- JE = Junior exempt
- JR = Junior Accelerator Programme entrant
- CO = College Accelerator Programme entrant
- NG = Next Gen Accelerator Program entrant
- w/o = Walkover
- r = Retired
- d = Defaulted

=== Finals ===
Semifinals
6	(United States) Nishesh Basavareddy	4	2
7	(Finland) Otto Virtanen	6	6
3	(United Kingdom) Toby Samuel	6	6
(Serbia) Laslo Djere	3	1

Final
7	(Finland) Otto Virtanen	6^{3}	2
3	(United Kingdom) Toby Samuel	7^{7}	6

=== Top half ===
First round
1	(Australia) J Duckworth	6^{2}	7	6^{1}
WC	(Finland) E Vasa	7^{7}	5	7^{7}
SE	(Italy) M Ribecai	6	5	3
(Lithuania) E Butvilas	3	7	6
Q	(Belgium) K Coppejans	2	6	2
(Croatia) B Gojo	6	3	6
(Estonia) D Glinka	3	2
6	(United States) N Basavareddy	6	6
4	(Czech Republic) D Svrčina	7	4	6
WC	(Sweden) L Borg	5	6	3
(Italy) S Travaglia	2	6	6
Q	(Croatia) L Mikrut	6	3	0
(Austria) L Neumayer	7^{7}	3	5
Q	(Switzerland) A Ritschard	6^{3}	6	7
LL	(Tunisia) M Echargui	7	3	2
7	(Finland) O Virtanen	5	6	6

Second round
WC	(Finland) E Vasa	1	5
(Lithuania) E Butvilas	6	7
(Croatia) B Gojo	6	3	4
6	(United States) N Basavareddy	3	6	6
4	(Czech Republic) D Svrčina	6	6
(Italy) S Travaglia	3	3
Q	(Switzerland) A Ritschard	6	1	5
7	(Finland) O Virtanen	4	6	7

Quarterfinals
(Lithuania) E Butvilas	2	3
6	(United States) N Basavareddy	6	6
4	(Czech Republic) D Svrčina	5	6	4
7	(Finland) O Virtanen	7	2	6

Semifinals
6	(United States) N Basavareddy	4	2
7	(Finland) O Virtanen	6	6

=== Bottom half ===
First round
8	(Japan) S Mochizuki	6	3	6^{3}
Alt	(Italy) L Giustino	4	6	7^{7}
WC	(Finland) Linus Lagerbohm	3	3
Q	Svyatoslav Gulin	6	6
(Italy) A Guerrieri	6	7^{7}
(Sweden) E Ymer	4	6^{2}
I Ivashka	7^{7}	1	4
3	(United Kingdom) T Samuel	6^{4}	6	6
5	(Austria) J Rodionov	6	6
Q	(India) S Nagal	3	4
(Norway) N Budkov Kjær	6^{6}	6	6
(Switzerland) M Brunold	7^{8}	0	2
Q	(Romania) C Crețu	7	4	4
(Serbia) L Djere	5	6	6
(Italy) G Cadenasso	5	0
2	(United Kingdom) J Fearnley	7	6

Second round
Alt	(Italy) L Giustino	6^{3}	3
Q	S Gulin	7^{7}	6
(Italy) A Guerrieri	6	3	4
3	(United Kingdom) T Samuel	4	6	6
5	(Austria) J Rodionov	6^{3}	0
(Norway) N Budkov Kjær	7^{7}	6
(Serbia) L Djere	6	1	7^{8}
2	(United Kingdom) J Fearnley	3	6	6^{6}

Quarterfinals
Q	S Gulin	6^{4}	4
3	(United Kingdom) T Samuel	7^{7}	6
(Norway) N Budkov Kjær	5	4
(Serbia) L Djere	7	6

Semifinals
3	(United Kingdom) T Samuel	6	6
(Serbia) L Djere	3	1
