= 2022 HPP Open – Singles =

Singles
- 2022 HPP Open

Final
- Champion: (Switzerland) Leandro Riedi
- Runner-up: (Czech Republic) Tomáš Macháč
- Score: 6–3, 6–1

Events
Singles	Doubles
← 2021 ·	HPP Open	· 2023 →

Alex Molčan was the defending champion but chose not to defend his title.

Leandro Riedi won the title after defeating Tomáš Macháč 6–3, 6–1 in the final.

== Seeds ==
1. Pavel Kotov (first round)
2. (Hungary) Márton Fucsovics (withdrew)
3. (Netherlands) Tim van Rijthoven (first round)
4. (Slovakia) Norbert Gombos (first round)
5. (Czech Republic) Tomáš Macháč (final)
6. (Spain) Pablo Andújar (first round)
7. (Sweden) Elias Ymer (first round)
8. (Netherlands) Jelle Sels (semifinals)

== Draw ==
=== Key ===
- Q = Qualifier
- WC = Wild card
- LL = Lucky loser
- Alt = Alternate
- SE = Special exempt
- PR = Protected ranking
- ITF = ITF entry
- JE = Junior exempt
- w/o = Walkover
- r = Retired
- d = Defaulted
- SR = Special ranking

=== Finals ===
Semifinals
Q	(Switzerland) Leandro Riedi	6	6^{5}	6
8	(Netherlands) Jelle Sels	3	7^{7}	4
5	(Czech Republic) Tomáš Macháč	6	6
(Germany) Yannick Hanfmann	1	2

Final
Q	(Switzerland) Leandro Riedi	6	6
5	(Czech Republic) Tomáš Macháč	3	1

=== Top half ===
First round
1	P Kotov	6^{7}	6^{5}
Alt	(Turkey) A Çelikbilek	7^{9}	7^{7}
Alt	(Bulgaria) D Kuzmanov	6	6
(France) H Gaston	3	3
Q	(Switzerland) L Riedi	6	6
Q	(France) G Mpetshi Perricard	1	4
(Germany) M Marterer	6	7^{8}
7	(Sweden) E Ymer	1	6^{6}
4	(Slovakia) N Gombos	6	6^{3}	1
(Italy) M Bellucci	4	7^{7}	6
Alt	(United Kingdom) J Clarke	1	6	6^{2}
Alt	(Bulgaria) A Andreev	6	3	7^{7}
(Italy) R Brancaccio	6	6
(Switzerland) H Laaksonen	3	3
(Czech Republic) V Kopřiva	3	7^{7}	3
8	(Netherlands) J Sels	6	6^{5}	6

Second round
Alt	(Turkey) A Çelikbilek	4	3
Alt	(Bulgaria) D Kuzmanov	6	6
Q	(Switzerland) L Riedi	7^{7}	6
(Germany) M Marterer	6^{5}	2
(Italy) M Bellucci	5	6	6^{2}
Alt	(Bulgaria) A Andreev	7	3	7^{7}
(Italy) R Brancaccio	6	3	2
8	(Netherlands) J Sels	4	6	6

Quarterfinals
Alt	(Bulgaria) D Kuzmanov	4	2
Q	(Switzerland) L Riedi	6	6
Alt	(Bulgaria) A Andreev	3	4
8	(Netherlands) J Sels	6	6

Semifinals
Q	(Switzerland) L Riedi	6	6^{5}	6
8	(Netherlands) J Sels	3	7^{7}	4

=== Bottom half ===
First round
5	(Czech Republic) T Macháč	7^{7}	6
Q	A Kachmazov	6^{4}	4
WC	(Finland) Aleksi Löfman	1	5
WC	(Finland) O Virtanen	6	7
Q	(Ukraine) O Krutykh	2	3
A Shevchenko	6	6
(Belgium) Z Bergs	7^{11}	6
3	(Netherlands) T van Rijthoven	6^{9}	1
6	(Spain) P Andújar	3	4
(Germany) Y Hanfmann	6	6
WC	(Finland) Leevi Säätelä	0	4
(United Kingdom) R Peniston	6	6
LL	E Karlovskiy	7^{9}	6
(Switzerland) A Ritschard	6^{7}	3
Q	(Italy) S Travaglia	2	4
Q	(Kazakhstan) M Kukushkin	6	6

Second round
5	(Czech Republic) T Macháč	6	6
WC	(Finland) O Virtanen	4	2
A Shevchenko	4	6	6^{2}
(Belgium) Z Bergs	6	3	7^{7}
(Germany) Y Hanfmann	6	6
(United Kingdom) R Peniston	3	4
LL	E Karlovskiy	2	2^{r}
Q	(Kazakhstan) M Kukushkin	6	4

Quarterfinals
5	(Czech Republic) T Macháč	6	6
(Belgium) Z Bergs	1	2
(Germany) Y Hanfmann	6	6
Q	(Kazakhstan) M Kukushkin	4	1

Semifinals
5	(Czech Republic) T Macháč	6	6
(Germany) Y Hanfmann	1	2
