= 2021 Tali Open – Singles =

Singles
- 2021 Tali Open

Final
- Champion: (Slovakia) Alex Molčan
- Runner-up: (Portugal) João Sousa
- Score: 6–3, 6–2

Events
| Singles | Doubles |
| ← 2019 · | Tali Open | · 2022 → |

Emil Ruusuvuori was the defending champion but withdrew from the tournament before his first round match.

Alex Molčan won the title after defeating João Sousa 6–3, 6–2 in the final.

== Seeds ==
1. (Finland) Emil Ruusuvuori (withdrew)
2. (Switzerland) Henri Laaksonen (semifinals)
3. (Slovakia) Alex Molčan (champion)
4. (Belarus) Egor Gerasimov (first round)
5. (Germany) Oscar Otte (quarterfinals)
6. (United Kingdom) Liam Broady (quarterfinals)
7. (Slovakia) Jozef Kovalík (first round)
8. (Serbia) Nikola Milojević (quarterfinals)

== Draw ==
=== Key ===
- Q = Qualifier
- WC = Wild card
- LL = Lucky loser
- Alt = Alternate
- SE = Special exempt
- PR = Protected ranking
- ITF = ITF entry
- JE = Junior exempt
- w/o = Walkover
- r = Retired
- d = Defaulted
- SR = Special ranking

=== Finals ===
Semifinals
Q | (Russia) Alexander Shevchenko | 2 | 6^{4}
3 | (Slovakia) Alex Molčan | 6 | 7^{7}
(Portugal) João Sousa | 6 | 6
2 | (Switzerland) Henri Laaksonen | 4 | 3

Final
3 | (Slovakia) Alex Molčan | 6 | 6
(Portugal) João Sousa | 3 | 2

=== Top half ===
First round
LL | (France) K Jacquet | 2 | 1
Q | (Russia) A Shevchenko | 6 | 6
(Belgium) K Coppejans | 4 | 4
Alt | (Germany) M Bachinger | 6 | 6
(Ecuador) E Gómez | 6 | 2 | 3
(Germany) M Marterer | 4 | 6 | 6
(Germany) M Moraing | 6 | 6
7 | (Slovakia) J Kovalík | 3 | 4
3 | (Slovakia) A Molčan | 6 | 0 | 7^{7}
(Netherlands) T van Rijthoven | 4 | 6 | 6^{1}
(Portugal) F Ferreira Silva | 3 | 6 | 3^{r}
Q | (Japan) S Mochizuki | 6 | 2 | 4
(Austria) J Rodionov | 7 | 6
(Egypt) M Safwat | 5 | 4
(Bosnia and Herzegovina) D Džumhur | 2 | 3
5 | (Germany) O Otte | 6 | 6

Second round
Q | (Russia) A Shevchenko | 7^{8} | 5
Alt | (Germany) M Bachinger | 6^{6} | 1^{r}
(Germany) M Marterer | 6^{5} | 6 | 4
(Germany) M Moraing | 7^{7} | 2 | 6
3 | (Slovakia) A Molčan | 6 | 6
Q | (Japan) S Mochizuki | 3 | 2
(Austria) J Rodionov | 1 | 2
5 | (Germany) O Otte | 6 | 6

Quarterfinals
Q | (Russia) A Shevchenko | 6 | 0
(Germany) M Moraing | 4 | 0^{r}
3 | (Slovakia) A Molčan | 6 | 4 | 6
5 | (Germany) O Otte | 3 | 6 | 1

Semifinals
Q | (Russia) A Shevchenko | 2 | 6^{4}
3 | (Slovakia) A Molčan | 6 | 7^{7}

=== Bottom half ===
First round
6 | (United Kingdom) L Broady | 6 | 6
SE | (Hungary) Z Piros | 3 | 2
Q | (Belgium) J De Loore | 6 | 6
(Germany) T Kamke | 3 | 4
(Portugal) J Sousa | 6 | 7^{11}
WC | (Finland) P Niklas-Salminen | 3 | 6^{9}
Q | (Czech Republic) J Forejtek | 4 | 6 | 6
4 | (Belarus) E Gerasimov | 6 | 3 | 4
8 | (Serbia) N Milojević | 6 | 6
(Italy) F Cobolli | 3 | 2
(India) R Ramanathan | 4 | 6 | 6
WC | (Finland) O Virtanen | 6 | 4 | 3
WC | (United Kingdom) J Draper | 5 | 1
Alt | (Germany) J Lenz | 7 | 6
(Uzbekistan) D Istomin | 3 | 3
2 | (Switzerland) H Laaksonen | 6 | 6

Second round
6 | (United Kingdom) L Broady | 6 | 7
Q | (Belgium) J De Loore | 3 | 5
(Portugal) J Sousa | 5 | 6 | 6
Q | (Czech Republic) J Forejtek | 7 | 4 | 4
8 | (Serbia) N Milojević | 3 | 6 | 6
(India) R Ramanathan | 6 | 1 | 2
Alt | (Germany) J Lenz | 2 | 5
2 | (Switzerland) H Laaksonen | 6 | 7

Quarterfinals
6 | (United Kingdom) L Broady | 7^{7} | 2 | 6^{1}
(Portugal) J Sousa | 6^{3} | 6 | 7^{7}
8 | (Serbia) N Milojević | 2 | 3
2 | (Switzerland) H Laaksonen | 6 | 6

Semifinals
(Portugal) J Sousa | 6 | 6
2 | (Switzerland) H Laaksonen | 4 | 3
