= 2025 HPP Open =

- Date: 3–9 November
- Edition: 6th
- Surface: Hard (Indoor)
- Location: Helsinki, Finland

Champions

Singles
- (United States) Patrick Kypson

Doubles
- (Germany) Jakob Schnaitter / (Germany) Mark Wallner
← 2024 ·	HPP Open	· 2026 →

The 2025 HPP Open was a professional tennis tournament played on hard courts. It was the sixth edition of the tournament which was part of the 2025 ATP Challenger Tour. It took place in Helsinki, Finland between 3 and 9 November 2025.

== Singles main-draw entrants ==
=== Seeds ===
Country	Player	Rank^{1}	Seed
CRO	Marin Čilić	75	1
ITA	Luca Nardi	81	2
USA	Brandon Holt	109	3
SRB	Dušan Lajović	116	4
USA	Patrick Kypson	146	5
FIN	Otto Virtanen	147	6
ITA	Giulio Zeppieri	153	7
CRO	Luka Mikrut	160	8

- ^{1} Rankings are as of 27 October 2025.

=== Other entrants ===
The following players received wildcards into the singles main draw:

- (Finland) Oskari Paldanius
- (Finland) Emil Ruusuvuori
- (Finland) Eero Vasa

The following player received entry into the singles main draw using a protected ranking:

- (Italy) Stefano Napolitano

The following players received entry into the singles main draw as special exempts:

- (France) Titouan Droguet
- (Italy) Lorenzo Giustino

The following players received entry from the qualifying draw:

- (France) Geoffrey Blancaneaux
- (Lithuania) Edas Butvilas
- (Croatia) Matej Dodig
- (Norway) Viktor Durasovic
- (France) Sascha Gueymard Wayenburg
- (United Kingdom) Stuart Parker

== Champions ==
=== Singles ===
- (United States) Patrick Kypson def. (Finland) Otto Virtanen 4–6, 6–3, 6–4.

=== Doubles ===
- (Germany) Jakob Schnaitter / (Germany) Mark Wallner def. (Romania) Alexandru Jecan / (Romania) Bogdan Pavel 6–2, 4–6, [10–6].
