= 2023 HPP Open =

- Date: 6–12 November
- Edition: 4th
- Surface: Hard (Indoor)
- Location: Helsinki, Finland

Champions

Singles
- (France) Corentin Moutet

Doubles
- (India) Sriram Balaji / (Germany) Andre Begemann
← 2022 ·	HPP Open	· 2024 →

The 2023 HPP Open was a professional tennis tournament played on hard courts. It was the fourth edition of the tournament which was part of the 2023 ATP Challenger Tour. It took place in Helsinki, Finland between 6 and 12 November 2023.

== Singles main-draw entrants ==
=== Seeds ===
Country	Player	Rank^{1}	Seed
CZE	Tomáš Macháč	64	1
FIN	Emil Ruusuvuori	71	2
POR	Nuno Borges	74	3
FRA	Alexandre Müller	83	4
ESP	Jaume Munar	87	5
ITA	Flavio Cobolli	98	6
FRA	Arthur Rinderknech	99	7
GBR	Liam Broady	100	8

- ^{1} Rankings are as of 30 October 2023.

=== Other entrants ===
The following players received wildcards into the singles main draw:

- (Finland) Patrick Kaukovalta
- (Estonia) Mark Lajal
- (Finland) Eero Vasa

The following player received entry into the singles main draw as a special exempt:

- (Switzerland) Antoine Bellier

The following player received entry into the singles main draw as an alternate:

- (India) Sumit Nagal

The following players received entry from the qualifying draw:

- Alibek Kachmazov
- (Ukraine) Oleksii Krutykh
- (Italy) Francesco Maestrelli
- (Austria) Maximilian Neuchrist
- (Austria) Dennis Novak
- (Kazakhstan) Denis Yevseyev

The following player received entry as a lucky loser:

- (Italy) Stefano Travaglia

== Champions ==
=== Singles ===
- (France) Corentin Moutet def. (India) Sumit Nagal 6–3, 3–6, 6–2.

=== Doubles ===
- (India) Sriram Balaji / (Germany) Andre Begemann def. (India) Jeevan Nedunchezhiyan / (India) Vijay Sundar Prashanth 6–2, 7–5.
