= 2021 Tali Open =

- Date: 15–21 November
- Edition: 2nd
- Surface: Hard (Indoor)
- Location: Helsinki, Finland

Champions

Singles
- (Slovakia) Alex Molčan

Doubles
- (Austria) Alexander Erler / (Austria) Lucas Miedler
← 2019 ·	Tali Open	· 2022 →

The 2021 Tali Open was a professional tennis tournament played on hard courts. It was the second edition of the tournament which was part of the 2021 ATP Challenger Tour. It took place in Helsinki, Finland between November 15 and November 21, 2021.

== Singles main-draw entrants ==
=== Seeds ===
Country	Player	Rank^{1}	Seed
~~FIN~~	~~Emil Ruusuvuori~~	~~79~~	~~1~~
SUI	Henri Laaksonen	99	2
SVK	Alex Molčan	106	3
BLR	Egor Gerasimov	113	4
GER	Oscar Otte	125	5
GBR	Liam Broady	127	6
SVK	Jozef Kovalík	135	7
SRB	Nikola Milojević	137	8

- ^{1} Rankings are as of 8 November 2021.

=== Other entrants ===
The following players received wildcards into the singles main draw:

- (United Kingdom) Jack Draper
- (Finland) Patrik Niklas-Salminen
- (Finland) Otto Virtanen

The following player received entry into the singles main draw as a special exempt:

- (Hungary) Zsombor Piros

The following players received entry into the singles main draw as alternates:

- (Germany) Matthias Bachinger
- (Germany) Julian Lenz

The following players received entry from the qualifying draw:

- (Belgium) Joris De Loore
- (Czech Republic) Jonáš Forejtek
- (Japan) Shintaro Mochizuki
- (Russia) Alexander Shevchenko

The following player received entry as a lucky loser:

- (France) Kyrian Jacquet

== Champions ==
=== Singles ===
- (Slovakia) Alex Molčan def. (Portugal) João Sousa 6–3, 6–2.

=== Doubles ===
- (Austria) Alexander Erler / (Austria) Lucas Miedler def. (Finland) Harri Heliövaara / (Netherlands) Jean-Julien Rojer 6–3, 7–6^{(7–2)}.
