= 2026 HPP Open – Doubles =

Doubles
- 2026 HPP Open

Final
- Champions: (Netherlands) Jean-Julien Rojer (United States) Theodore Winegar
- Runners-up: (United Kingdom) Luke Johnson (New Zealand) Michael Venus
- Score: 7–6^{(7–5)}, 6–1

Events
| Singles | Doubles |
- HPP Open

Jakob Schnaitter and Mark Wallner were the defending champions but chose not to defend their title.

Jean-Julien Rojer and Theodore Winegar won the title after defeating Luke Johnson and Michael Venus 7–6^{(7–5)}, 6–1 in the final.

== Seeds ==
1. (Netherlands) Jean-Julien Rojer / (United States) Theodore Winegar (champions)
2. (United Kingdom) Luke Johnson / (New Zealand) Michael Venus (final)
3. (Switzerland) Jakub Paul / (Czech Republic) Matěj Vocel (semifinals)
4. Ivan Liutarevich / (Poland) Filip Pieczonka (semifinals)

== Draw ==
Key

- Q = Qualifier
- WC = Wild card
- LL = Lucky loser
- Alt = Alternate
- ITF = ITF entry
- PR = Protected ranking
- SR = Special ranking
- SE = Special exempt
- JE = Junior exempt
- JR = Junior Accelerator Programme entrant
- CO = College Accelerator Programme entrant
- NG = Next Gen Accelerator Program entrant
- w/o = Walkover
- r = Retired
- d = Defaulted

First round
1 | (Netherlands) J-J Rojer (United States) T Winegar | 6 | 6
WC | (Finland) Vesa Ahti (Finland) Arttu Ronkainen | 2 | 3
Alt | (Italy) M Ribecai (Italy) S Travaglia | 3 | 6 | [6]
(Bulgaria) A Genov (United States) B Kittay | 6 | 3 | [10]
4 | I Liutarevich (Poland) F Pieczonka | 6 | 6
WC | (Finland) Felix Alopaeus (Finland) Linus Lagerbohm | 3 | 2
(United Kingdom) J MacKinlay (India) J Nedunchezhiyan | 6^{6} | 6^{3}
(Finland) P Niklas-Salminen (Czech Republic) M Vrbenský | 7^{8} | 7^{7}
(Portugal) T Pereira (Spain) B Winter López | 6 | 6
(Republic of Ireland) M Agwi (Germany) John Sperle | 2 | 4
(Finland) E Vasa (Finland) Iiro Vasa | 4 | 4
3 | (Switzerland) J Paul (Czech Republic) M Vocel | 6 | 6
(Israel) D Cukierman (Brazil) F Romboli | 6 | 7^{7}
(Norway) V Durasovic (Ukraine) Vadym Ursu | 3 | 6^{4}
(Romania) V Cornea (Germany) K Wehnelt | 4 | 6^{4}
2 | (United Kingdom) L Johnson (New Zealand) M Venus | 6 | 7^{7}

Quarterfinals
1 | (Netherlands) J-J Rojer (United States) T Winegar | 6 | 5 | [10]
(Bulgaria) A Genov (United States) B Kittay | 3 | 7 | [5]
4 | I Liutarevich (Poland) F Pieczonka | 4 | 7^{8} | [10]
(Finland) P Niklas-Salminen (Czech Republic) M Vrbenský | 6 | 6^{6} | [4]
(Portugal) T Pereira (Spain) B Winter López | 4 | 4
3 | (Switzerland) J Paul (Czech Republic) M Vocel | 6 | 6
(Israel) D Cukierman (Brazil) F Romboli | 2 | 6 | [8]
2 | (United Kingdom) L Johnson (New Zealand) M Venus | 6 | 2 | [10]

Semifinals
1 | (Netherlands) J-J Rojer (United States) T Winegar | 6 | 6
4 | I Liutarevich (Poland) F Pieczonka | 2 | 3
3 | (Switzerland) J Paul (Czech Republic) M Vocel | 2 | 3
2 | (United Kingdom) L Johnson (New Zealand) M Venus | 6 | 6

Final
1 | (Netherlands) J-J Rojer (United States) T Winegar | 7^{7} | 6
2 | (United Kingdom) L Johnson (New Zealand) M Venus | 6^{5} | 1
