= 2019 Tali Open – Singles =

Singles
- 2019 Tali Open

Final
- Champion: (Finland) Emil Ruusuvuori
- Runner-up: (Egypt) Mohamed Safwat
- Score: 6–3, 6–7^{(4–7)}, 6–2

Events
Singles	Doubles
- Tali Open

This was the first edition of the tournament.

Emil Ruusuvuori won the title after defeating Mohamed Safwat 6–3, 6–7^{(4–7)}, 6–2 in the final.

== Seeds ==
All seeds receive a bye into the second round.

1. (Belarus) Egor Gerasimov (withdrew)
2. (Switzerland) Henri Laaksonen (second round)
3. (Bosnia and Herzegovina) Damir Džumhur (withdrew)
4. (Slovakia) Norbert Gombos (third round)
5. (Italy) Thomas Fabbiano (second round)
6. (Germany) Yannick Maden (second round)
7. (Sweden) Elias Ymer (quarterfinals)
8. (Belarus) Ilya Ivashka (semifinals)
9. (Spain) Guillermo García López (second round)
10. (Finland) Emil Ruusuvuori (champion)
11. (Ukraine) Sergiy Stakhovsky (quarterfinals)
12. (Serbia) Nikola Milojević (third round)
13. (Portugal) Frederico Ferreira Silva (second round)
14. (Egypt) Mohamed Safwat (final)
15. (Spain) Carlos Taberner (semifinals)
16. (Japan) Hiroki Moriya (second round)
17. (Russia) Evgeny Karlovskiy (second round)

== Draw ==
Key

- Q = Qualifier
- WC = Wild card
- LL = Lucky loser
- Alt = Alternate
- ITF = ITF entry
- PR = Protected ranking
- SR = Special ranking
- SE = Special exempt
- JE = Junior exempt
- JR = Junior Accelerator Programme entrant
- CO = College Accelerator Programme entrant
- NG = Next Gen Accelerator Program entrant
- w/o = Walkover
- r = Retired
- d = Defaulted

=== Finals ===
Quarterfinals
WC	(Finland) Harri Heliövaara	6	1	2
8	(Belarus) Ilya Ivashka	3	6	6
(Slovakia) Alex Molčan	3	5
10	(Finland) Emil Ruusuvuori	6	7
11	(Ukraine) Sergiy Stakhovsky	6^{5}	3
15	(Spain) Carlos Taberner	7^{7}	6
7	(Sweden) Elias Ymer	3	4
14	(Egypt) Mohamed Safwat	6	6

Semifinals
8	(Belarus) Ilya Ivashka	6^{4}	3
10	(Finland) Emil Ruusuvuori	7^{7}	6
15	(Spain) Carlos Taberner	1	3
14	(Egypt) Mohamed Safwat	6	6

Final
10	(Finland) Emil Ruusuvuori	6	6^{4}	6
14	(Egypt) Mohamed Safwat	3	7^{7}	2

=== Top half ===
==== Section 1 ====
First round
(Brazil) B Sant'Anna	4	1
(France) H Grenier	6	6
(Russia) A Dubrivnyy	3	2
WC	(Finland) H Heliövaara	6	6
(France) A Müller	6	6
(Norway) V Durasovic	1	2
(Australia) J-P Smith	6	6
LL	(Finland) Aleksi Löfman	2	1

Second round
17	(Russia) E Karlovskiy	5	2
(France) H Grenier	7	6
WC	(Finland) H Heliövaara	4	7^{9}	6
16	(Japan) H Moriya	6	6^{7}	3
9	(Spain) G García López	3	3
(France) A Müller	6	6
(Australia) J-P Smith	6	4	4
8	(Belarus) I Ivashka	2	6	6

Third round
(France) H Grenier	1	3
WC	(Finland) H Heliövaara	6	6
(France) A Müller	4	3
8	(Belarus) I Ivashka	6	6

Quarterfinals
WC	(Finland) H Heliövaara	6	1	2
8	(Belarus) I Ivashka	3	6	6

==== Section 2 ====
First round
PR	(Spain) C Gómez-Herrera	4	2
(Bosnia and Herzegovina) N Fatić	6	6
(Tunisia) S Mansouri	6^{3}	2
(Slovakia) A Molčan	7^{7}	6
(France) G Blancaneaux	6	4	6
(Czech Republic) V Kopřiva	2	6	3
WC	(Finland) Leevi Säätelä	0	3
WC	(Finland) O Virtanen	6	6

Second round
4	(Slovakia) N Gombos	6	6
(Bosnia and Herzegovina) N Fatić	2	3
(Slovakia) A Molčan	6	6^{2}	6
13	(Portugal) F Ferreira Silva	4	7^{7}	1
10	(Finland) E Ruusuvuori	7	6
(France) G Blancaneaux	5	2
WC	(Finland) O Virtanen	1	6	6
5	(Italy) T Fabbiano	6	3	4

Third round
4	(Slovakia) N Gombos	4	7^{7}	3
(Slovakia) A Molčan	6	6^{4}	6
10	(Finland) E Ruusuvuori	6	6
WC	(Finland) O Virtanen	1	1

Quarterfinals
(Slovakia) A Molčan	3	5
10	(Finland) E Ruusuvuori	6	7

=== Bottom half ===
==== Section 3 ====
First round
(France) R Roumane	6	6^{2}	6
(Italy) Fabrizio Ornago	4	7^{7}	3
(Germany) M Zverev	6	6
(Czech Republic) M Vrbenský	3	3
(Russia) P Kotov	5	6^{7}
(Turkey) A Çelikbilek	7	7^{9}
(Ukraine) I Marchenko	4	0^{r}
WC	(Finland) P Niklas-Salminen	6	2

Second round
6	(Germany) Y Maden	4	7	1
(France) R Roumane	6	5	6
(Germany) M Zverev	6	1^{r}
11	(Ukraine) S Stakhovsky	4	2
15	(Spain) C Taberner	3	6	7^{7}
(Turkey) A Çelikbilek	6	3	6^{4}
WC	(Finland) P Niklas-Salminen	6	4	6
Alt	(Czech Republic) D Poljak	4	6	3

Third round
(France) R Roumane	3	7	3
11	(Ukraine) S Stakhovsky	6	5	6
15	(Spain) C Taberner	3	6	6
WC	(Finland) P Niklas-Salminen	6	3	3

Quarterfinals
11	(Ukraine) S Stakhovsky	6^{5}	3
15	(Spain) C Taberner	7^{7}	6

==== Section 4 ====
First round
WC	(Czech Republic) J Forejtek	6	3	4
(United Kingdom) J Draper	3	6	6
Q	(Czech Republic) J Pospíšil	7	6
(Netherlands) I Sijsling	5	2
Q	(Sweden) J Mridha	5	6	6^{7}
(France) A Escoffier	7	4	7^{9}
(Kazakhstan) D Yevseyev	4	3
Alt	(France) Gabriel Petit	6	6

Second round
7	(Sweden) E Ymer	6	3	6
(United Kingdom) J Draper	3	6	4
Q	(Czech Republic) J Pospíšil	0	6	3
12	(Serbia) N Milojević	6	4	6
14	(Egypt) M Safwat	6	6
(France) A Escoffier	4	2
Alt	(France) G Petit	4	6	6
2	(Switzerland) H Laaksonen	6	4	4

Third round
7	(Sweden) E Ymer	7	7
12	(Serbia) N Milojević	5	5
14	(Egypt) M Safwat	6	6
Alt	(France) G Petit	1	3

Quarterfinals
7	(Sweden) E Ymer	3	4
14	(Egypt) M Safwat	6	6
