= 2019 Tali Open – Doubles =

Doubles
- 2019 Tali Open

Final
- Champions: (Denmark) Frederik Nielsen (Germany) Tim Pütz
- Runners-up: (Croatia) Tomislav Draganja (Russia) Pavel Kotov
- Score: 7–6^{(7–2)}, 6–0

Events
Singles	Doubles
- Tali Open

This was the first edition of the tournament.

Frederik Nielsen and Tim Pütz won the title after defeating Tomislav Draganja and Pavel Kotov 7–6^{(7–2)}, 6–0 in the final.

== Seeds ==
1. (Denmark) Frederik Nielsen / (Germany) Tim Pütz (champions)
2. (Ukraine) Denys Molchanov / (Belarus) Andrei Vasilevski (first round)
3. (United States) Nicholas Monroe / (Australia) John-Patrick Smith (first round)
4. (Poland) Karol Drzewiecki / (Poland) Szymon Walków (first round)

== Draw ==
Key

- Q = Qualifier
- WC = Wild card
- LL = Lucky loser
- Alt = Alternate
- ITF = ITF entry
- PR = Protected ranking
- SR = Special ranking
- SE = Special exempt
- JE = Junior exempt
- JR = Junior Accelerator Programme entrant
- CO = College Accelerator Programme entrant
- NG = Next Gen Accelerator Program entrant
- w/o = Walkover
- r = Retired
- d = Defaulted

First round
1	(Denmark) F Nielsen (Germany) T Pütz	7	6
(Russia) M Elgin (Belarus) I Ivashka	5	2
(Czech Republic) V Kopřiva (Czech Republic) M Vrbenský	6	2	[4]
(Norway) V Durasovic (Czech Republic) D Poljak	1	6	[10]
4	(Poland) K Drzewiecki (Poland) S Walków	4	3
(Finland) H Heliövaara (Finland) P Niklas-Salminen	6	6
WC	(Czech Republic) J Forejtek (Finland) O Virtanen
(France) A Escoffier (France) Gabriel Petit	w/o
(Spain) G García López (Spain) C Gómez-Herrera	6	6
WC	(Finland) Aleksi Löfman (Finland) Masi Sarpola	2	4
(Russia) A Dubrivnyy (Kazakhstan) D Yevseyev	7^{9}	0	[10]
3	(United States) N Monroe (Australia) J-P Smith	6^{7}	6	[8]
WC	(Finland) Roni Mikael Hietaranta (Finland) Mikko Rouvala	2	4
(Croatia) T Draganja (Russia) P Kotov	6	6
(United Kingdom) S Clayton (Tunisia) S Mansouri	4	7^{9}	[10]
2	(Ukraine) D Molchanov (Belarus) A Vasilevski	6	6^{7}	[4]

Quarterfinals
1	(Denmark) F Nielsen (Germany) T Pütz	7^{7}	6
(Norway) V Durasovic (Czech Republic) D Poljak	6^{1}	4
(Finland) H Heliövaara (Finland) P Niklas-Salminen	7^{8}	6
(France) A Escoffier (France) G Petit	6^{6}	1
(Spain) G García López (Spain) C Gómez-Herrera	6	6^{5}	[2]
(Russia) A Dubrivnyy (Kazakhstan) D Yevseyev	2	7^{7}	[10]
(Croatia) T Draganja (Russia) P Kotov	6	4	[11]
(United Kingdom) S Clayton (Tunisia) S Mansouri	4	6	[9]

Semifinals
1	(Denmark) F Nielsen (Germany) T Pütz	3	7^{7}	[10]
(Finland) H Heliövaara (Finland) P Niklas-Salminen	6	6^{5}	[8]
(Russia) A Dubrivnyy (Kazakhstan) D Yevseyev	6^{5}	7^{7}	[5]
(Croatia) T Draganja (Russia) P Kotov	7^{7}	6^{2}	[10]

Final
1	(Denmark) F Nielsen (Germany) T Pütz	7^{7}	6
(Croatia) T Draganja (Russia) P Kotov	6^{2}	0
