= 2022 HPP Open =

- Date: 14–20 November
- Edition: 3rd
- Surface: Hard (Indoor)
- Location: Helsinki, Finland

Champions

Singles
- (Switzerland) Leandro Riedi

Doubles
- (India) Purav Raja / (India) Divij Sharan
← 2021 ·	HPP Open	· 2023 →

The 2022 HPP Open was a professional tennis tournament played on hard courts. It was the third edition of the tournament which was part of the 2022 ATP Challenger Tour. It took place in Helsinki, Finland between 14 and 20 November 2022.

== Singles main-draw entrants ==
=== Seeds ===
Country	Player	Rank^{1}	Seed
	Pavel Kotov	100	1
~~HUN~~	~~Márton Fucsovics~~	~~109~~	~~2~~
NED	Tim van Rijthoven	110	3
SVK	Norbert Gombos	112	4
CZE	Tomáš Macháč	117	5
ESP	Pablo Andújar	123	6
SWE	Elias Ymer	127	7
NED	Jelle Sels	130	8

- ^{1} Rankings are as of 7 November 2022.

=== Other entrants ===
The following players received wildcards into the singles main draw:

- (Finland) Aleksi Löfman
- (Finland) Leevi Säätelä
- (Finland) Otto Virtanen

The following players received entry into the singles main draw as alternates:

- (Bulgaria) Adrian Andreev
- (Turkey) Altuğ Çelikbilek
- (United Kingdom) Jay Clarke
- (Bulgaria) Dimitar Kuzmanov

The following players received entry from the qualifying draw:

- Alibek Kachmazov
- (Ukraine) Oleksii Krutykh
- (Kazakhstan) Mikhail Kukushkin
- (France) Giovanni Mpetshi Perricard
- (Switzerland) Leandro Riedi
- (Italy) Stefano Travaglia

The following player received entry as a lucky loser:

- Evgeny Karlovskiy

== Champions ==
=== Singles ===
- (Switzerland) Leandro Riedi def. (Czech Republic) Tomáš Macháč 6–3, 6–1.

=== Doubles ===
- (India) Purav Raja / (India) Divij Sharan def. (United States) Reese Stalder / (Greece) Petros Tsitsipas 6–7^{(5–7)}, 6–3, [10–8].
