= 2024 HPP Open =

- Date: 4–10 November
- Edition: 5th
- Surface: Hard (Indoor)
- Location: Helsinki, Finland

Champions

Singles
- (Japan) Kei Nishikori

Doubles
- (Sweden) Filip Bergevi / (Netherlands) Mick Veldheer
- HPP Open

The 2024 HPP Open was a professional tennis tournament played on hard courts. It was the fifth edition of the tournament which was part of the 2024 ATP Challenger Tour. It took place in Helsinki, Finland between 4 and 10 November 2024.

== Singles main-draw entrants ==
=== Seeds ===
Country	Player	Rank^{1}	Seed
~~CAN~~	~~Gabriel Diallo~~	~~89~~	~~1~~
~~CRO~~	~~Borna Ćorić~~	~~95~~	~~2~~
FIN	Otto Virtanen	96	3
GBR	Jacob Fearnley	98	4
ITA	Luca Nardi	102	5
KAZ	Mikhail Kukushkin	110	6
SUI	Jérôme Kym	134	7
GER	Maximilian Marterer	137	8

- ^{1} Rankings are as of 28 October 2024.

=== Other entrants ===
The following players received wildcards into the singles main draw:

- (Finland) Patrick Kaukovalta
- (Estonia) Oliver Ojakäär
- (Finland) Oskari Paldanius

The following player received entry into the singles main draw as a special exempt:

- (Venezuela) Gonzalo Oliveira

The following players received entry into the singles main draw as alternates:

- (Italy) Federico Arnaboldi
- (Germany) Rudolf Molleker

The following players received entry from the qualifying draw:

- (Spain) Nicolás Álvarez Varona
- (France) Geoffrey Blancaneaux
- (France) Alexis Gautier
- (Austria) Sandro Kopp
- (Germany) Max Hans Rehberg
- (Jordan) Abdullah Shelbayh

The following players received entry as lucky losers:

- (Lithuania) Ričardas Berankis
- (Netherlands) Jelle Sels

== Champions ==
=== Singles ===
- (Japan) Kei Nishikori def. (Italy) Luca Nardi 3–6, 6–4, 6–1.

=== Doubles ===
- (Sweden) Filip Bergevi / (Netherlands) Mick Veldheer def. (Monaco) Romain Arneodo / (France) Théo Arribagé 3–6, 7–6^{(7–5)}, [10–5].
