= 2021 Belgrade Open – Doubles =

Doubles
- 2021 Belgrade Open

Final
- Champions: (Israel) Jonathan Erlich (Belarus) Andrei Vasilevski
- Runners-up: (Sweden) André Göransson (Brazil) Rafael Matos
- Score: 6–4, 6–1

Events
Singles	Doubles
- Belgrade Open

This was the first edition of the tournament, primarily created due to the one-week delay of the 2021 French Open.

Jonathan Erlich and Andrei Vasilevski won the title, defeating André Göransson and Rafael Matos in the final, 6–4, 6–1.

== Seeds ==
1. (India) Rohan Bopanna / (Croatia) Franko Škugor (first round)
2. (France) Fabrice Martin / (Monaco) Hugo Nys (first round)
3. (Uruguay) Ariel Behar / (Ecuador) Gonzalo Escobar (first round)
4. (Brazil) Marcelo Demoliner / (Mexico) Santiago González (quarterfinals)

== Draw ==
Key

- Q = Qualifier
- WC = Wild card
- LL = Lucky loser
- Alt = Alternate
- ITF = ITF entry
- PR = Protected ranking
- SR = Special ranking
- SE = Special exempt
- JE = Junior exempt
- JR = Junior Accelerator Programme entrant
- CO = College Accelerator Programme entrant
- NG = Next Gen Accelerator Program entrant
- w/o = Walkover
- r = Retired
- d = Defaulted

=== Draw ===
First round
1	(India) R Bopanna (Croatia) F Škugor	3	6	[8]
(Argentina) F Delbonis (New Zealand) A Sitak	6	4	[10]
WC	(Croatia) I Sabanov (Croatia) M Sabanov	4	6	[10]
(Bosnia and Herzegovina) T Brkić (Serbia) N Ćaćić	6	3	[8]
3	(Uruguay) A Behar (Ecuador) G Escobar	7	6^{3}	[4]
(Netherlands) S Arends (Venezuela) LD Martínez	5	7^{7}	[10]
(Israel) J Erlich (Belarus) A Vasilevski	6	4	[10]
(Argentina) A Molteni (Denmark) F Nielsen	4	6	[3]
(Spain) R Carballés Baena (Argentina) F Coria	3	4
(United Kingdom) L Bambridge (United Kingdom) D Inglot	6	6
WC	(Serbia) H Međedović (Serbia) M Tepavac	6^{0}	6	[9]
4	(Brazil) M Demoliner (Mexico) S González	7^{7}	3	[11]
(Sweden) A Göransson (Brazil) R Matos	6	5	[10]
(India) D Sharan (Australia) J-P Smith	4	7	[6]
(United States) A Krajicek (United States) T Sandgren	6	6^{5}	[10]
2	(France) F Martin (Monaco) H Nys	3	7^{7}	[8]

Quarterfinals
(Argentina) F Delbonis (New Zealand) A Sitak	2	1
WC	(Croatia) I Sabanov (Croatia) M Sabanov	6	6
(Netherlands) S Arends (Venezuela) LD Martínez	3	6	[6]
(Israel) J Erlich (Belarus) A Vasilevski	6	0	[10]
(United Kingdom) L Bambridge (United Kingdom) D Inglot	6	6
4	(Brazil) M Demoliner (Mexico) S González	4	4
(Sweden) A Göransson (Brazil) R Matos	6	6
(United States) A Krajicek (United States) T Sandgren	1	3

Semifinals
WC	(Croatia) I Sabanov (Croatia) M Sabanov	3	6	[11]
(Israel) J Erlich (Belarus) A Vasilevski	6	3	[13]
(United Kingdom) L Bambridge (United Kingdom) D Inglot	6^{3}	6	[4]
(Sweden) A Göransson (Brazil) R Matos	7^{7}	1	[10]

Final
(Israel) J Erlich (Belarus) A Vasilevski	6	6
(Sweden) A Göransson (Brazil) R Matos	4	1
