= 2024 HPP Open – Singles =

Singles
- 2024 HPP Open

Final
- Champion: (Japan) Kei Nishikori
- Runner-up: (Italy) Luca Nardi
- Score: 3–6, 6–4, 6–1

Events
Singles	Doubles
- HPP Open

Corentin Moutet was the defending champion but chose not to defend his title.

Kei Nishikori won the title after defeating Luca Nardi 3–6, 6–4, 6–1 in the final.

== Seeds ==
1. (Canada) Gabriel Diallo (withdrew)
2. (Croatia) Borna Ćorić (withdrew)
3. (Finland) Otto Virtanen (quarterfinals)
4. (United Kingdom) Jacob Fearnley (quarterfinals)
5. (Italy) Luca Nardi (final)
6. (Kazakhstan) Mikhail Kukushkin (first round)
7. (Switzerland) Jérôme Kym (second round)
8. (Germany) Maximilian Marterer (second round)

== Draw ==
Key

- Q = Qualifier
- WC = Wild card
- LL = Lucky loser
- Alt = Alternate
- ITF = ITF entry
- PR = Protected ranking
- SR = Special ranking
- SE = Special exempt
- JE = Junior exempt
- JR = Junior Accelerator Programme entrant
- CO = College Accelerator Programme entrant
- NG = Next Gen Accelerator Program entrant
- w/o = Walkover
- r = Retired
- d = Defaulted

=== Finals ===
Semifinals
Q	(Germany) Max Hans Rehberg	4	7^{8}	2
(Japan) Kei Nishikori	6	6^{6}	6
(Kazakhstan) Denis Yevseyev	6	3	6^{4}
5	(Italy) Luca Nardi	2	6	7^{7}

Final
(Japan) Kei Nishikori	3	6	6
5	(Italy) Luca Nardi	6	4	1

=== Top half ===
First round
LL	(Lithuania) R Berankis	3	4
(Germany) H Squire	6	6
(Italy) A Pellegrino	6	6
Q	(France) Alexis Gautier	3	1
Q	(Germany) MH Rehberg	6	1	6
Q	(France) G Blancaneaux	4	6	3
(Argentina) S Rodríguez Taverna	3	3
8	(Germany) M Marterer	6	6
4	(United Kingdom) J Fearnley	6	6
(France) V Royer	2	3
A Kachmazov	1	2
(United States) Em Nava	6	6
(Japan) K Nishikori	6	6
Q	(Spain) N Álvarez Varona	4	2
Q	(Jordan) A Shelbayh	2	1
7	(Switzerland) J Kym	6	6

Second round
(Germany) H Squire	7	6
(Italy) A Pellegrino	5	4
Q	(Germany) MH Rehberg	7^{7}	6
8	(Germany) M Marterer	6^{5}	4
4	(United Kingdom) J Fearnley	6	6
(United States) Em Nava	4	3
(Japan) K Nishikori	6	1	6
7	(Switzerland) J Kym	3	6	2

Quarterfinals
(Germany) H Squire	6^{5}	6^{5}
Q	(Germany) MH Rehberg	7^{7}	7^{7}
4	(United Kingdom) J Fearnley	4	3
(Japan) K Nishikori	6	6

Semifinals
Q	(Germany) MH Rehberg	4	7^{8}	2
(Japan) K Nishikori	6	6^{6}	6

=== Bottom half ===
First round
6	(Kazakhstan) M Kukushkin	4	5
Alt	(Italy) F Arnaboldi	6	7
(Kazakhstan) D Yevseyev	6	6
WC	(Estonia) O Ojakäär	2	4
WC	(Finland) Patrick Kaukovalta	6	4	7^{8}
WC	(Finland) O Paldanius	3	6	6^{6}
Alt	(Germany) R Molleker	4	3
3	(Finland) O Virtanen	6	6
5	(Italy) L Nardi	6	0
SE	(Venezuela) G Oliveira	3	0^{r}
(Denmark) A Holmgren	6	6
(Lithuania) E Butvilas	4	1
Q	(Austria) S Kopp	2	1
(United Kingdom) J Choinski	6	6
(Brazil) J Fonseca	6	6
LL	(Netherlands) J Sels	2	3

Second round
Alt	(Italy) F Arnaboldi	2	4
(Kazakhstan) D Yevseyev	6	6
WC	(Finland) P Kaukovalta	3	2
3	(Finland) O Virtanen	6	6
5	(Italy) L Nardi	7^{8}	7^{7}
(Denmark) A Holmgren	6^{6}	6^{2}
(United Kingdom) J Choinski	0	6	6
(Brazil) J Fonseca	6	1	2

Quarterfinals
(Kazakhstan) D Yevseyev	6	7
3	(Finland) O Virtanen	4	5
5	(Italy) L Nardi	6	6
(United Kingdom) J Choinski	4	3

Semifinals
(Kazakhstan) D Yevseyev	6	3	6^{4}
5	(Italy) L Nardi	2	6	7^{7}
