= 2019 Tali Open =

- Date: 11 November – 17 November
- Edition: 1st
- Surface: Hard (indoor)
- Location: Helsinki, Finland

Champions

Singles
- (Finland) Emil Ruusuvuori

Doubles
- (Denmark) Frederik Nielsen / (Germany) Tim Pütz
- Tali Open

The 2019 Tali Open is a professional tennis tournament played on hard courts. It was the first edition of the tournament which was part of the 2019 ATP Challenger Tour. It took place in Helsinki, Finland between November 11 and November 17, 2019.

== Singles main-draw entrants ==
=== Seeds ===
Country	Player	Rank^{1}	Seed
~~BLR~~	~~Egor Gerasimov~~	~~100~~	~~1~~
SUI	Henri Laaksonen	102	2
~~BIH~~	~~Damir Džumhur~~	~~103~~	~~3~~
SVK	Norbert Gombos	109	4
ITA	Thomas Fabbiano	116	5
GER	Yannick Maden	117	6
SWE	Elias Ymer	123	7
BLR	Ilya Ivashka	143	8
ESP	Guillermo García López	145	9
FIN	Emil Ruusuvuori	147	10
UKR	Sergiy Stakhovsky	150	11
SRB	Nikola Milojević	152	12
POR	Frederico Ferreira Silva	175	13
EGY	Mohamed Safwat	207	14
ESP	Carlos Taberner	215	15
JPN	Hiroki Moriya	219	16
RUS	Evgeny Karlovskiy	242	17

- ^{1} Rankings are as of November 4, 2019.

=== Other entrants ===
The following players received wildcards into the singles main draw:

- (Czech Republic) Jonáš Forejtek
- (Finland) Harri Heliövaara
- (Finland) Patrik Niklas-Salminen
- (Finland) Leevi Säätelä
- (Finland) Otto Virtanen

The following player received entry into the singles main draw using a protected ranking:

- (Spain) Carlos Gómez-Herrera

The following players received entry into the singles main draw as alternates:

- (France) Gabriel Petit
- (Czech Republic) David Poljak

The following players received entry from the qualifying draw:

- (Sweden) Jonathan Mridha
- (Czech Republic) Jaroslav Pospíšil

The following player received entry as a lucky loser:

- (Finland) Aleksi Löfman

== Champions ==
=== Singles ===
- (Finland) Emil Ruusuvuori def. (Egypt) Mohamed Safwat 6–3, 6–7^{(4–7)}, 6–2.

=== Doubles ===
- (Denmark) Frederik Nielsen / (Germany) Tim Pütz def. (Croatia) Tomislav Draganja / (Russia) Pavel Kotov 7–6^{(7–2)}, 6–0.
