= 2026 HPP Open =

- Date: 16–22 November
- Edition: 7th
- Surface: Hard (Indoor)
- Location: Helsinki, Finland

Champions

Singles
- (United Kingdom) Toby Samuel

Doubles
- (Netherlands) Jean-Julien Rojer / (United States) Theodore Winegar
- HPP Open

The 2026 HPP Open was a professional tennis tournament played on hard courts. It was the seventh edition of the tournament which was part of the 2026 ATP Challenger Tour. It took place in Helsinki, Finland between 16 and 22 November 2026.

== Singles main-draw entrants ==
=== Seeds ===
| Country | Player | Rank^{1} | Seed |
|---|---|---|---|
| AUS | James Duckworth | 76 | 1 |
| GBR | Jacob Fearnley | 87 | 2 |
| GBR | Toby Samuel | 95 | 3 |
| CZE | Dalibor Svrčina | 112 | 4 |
| AUT | Jurij Rodionov | 118 | 5 |
| USA | Nishesh Basavareddy | 126 | 6 |
| FIN | Otto Virtanen | 127 | 7 |
| JPN | Shintaro Mochizuki | 128 | 8 |

- ^{1} Rankings are as of 9 November 2026.

=== Other entrants ===
The following players received wildcards into the singles main draw:

- (Sweden) Leo Borg
- (Finland) Linus Lagerbohm
- (Finland) Eero Vasa

The following player received entry into the singles main draw as a special exempt:

- (Italy) Michele Ribecai

The following player received entry into the singles main draw as an alternate:

- (Italy) Lorenzo Giustino

The following players received entry from the qualifying draw:

- (Belgium) Kimmer Coppejans
- (Romania) Cezar Crețu
- Svyatoslav Gulin
- (Croatia) Luka Mikrut
- (India) Sumit Nagal
- (Switzerland) Alexander Ritschard

The following player received entry as a lucky loser:

- (Tunisia) Moez Echargui

== Champions ==
=== Singles ===
- (United Kingdom) Toby Samuel def. (Finland) Otto Virtanen 7–6^{(7–3)}, 6–2.

=== Doubles ===
- (Netherlands) Jean-Julien Rojer / (United States) Theodore Winegar def. (United Kingdom) Luke Johnson / (New Zealand) Michael Venus 7–6^{(7–5)}, 6–1.
