= 2024 HPP Open – Doubles =

Doubles
- 2024 HPP Open

Final
- Champions: (Sweden) Filip Bergevi (Netherlands) Mick Veldheer
- Runners-up: (Monaco) Romain Arneodo (France) Théo Arribagé
- Score: 3–6, 7–6^{(7–5)}, [10–5]

Events
Singles	Doubles
- HPP Open

Sriram Balaji and Andre Begemann were the defending champions but chose not to defend their title.

Filip Bergevi and Mick Veldheer won the title after defeating Romain Arneodo and Théo Arribagé 3–6, 7–6^{(7–5)}, [10–5] in the final.

== Seeds ==
1. (United Kingdom) Neal Skupski / (New Zealand) Michael Venus (withdrew)
2. (Monaco) Romain Arneodo / (France) Théo Arribagé (final)
3. (India) Jeevan Nedunchezhiyan / (India) Vijay Sundar Prashanth (first round)
4. (Italy) Marco Bortolotti / (Finland) Patrik Niklas-Salminen (semifinals)
5. (Sweden) Filip Bergevi / (Netherlands) Mick Veldheer (champions)

== Draw ==
Key

- Q = Qualifier
- WC = Wild card
- LL = Lucky loser
- Alt = Alternate
- ITF = ITF entry
- PR = Protected ranking
- SR = Special ranking
- SE = Special exempt
- JE = Junior exempt
- JR = Junior Accelerator Programme entrant
- CO = College Accelerator Programme entrant
- NG = Next Gen Accelerator Program entrant
- w/o = Walkover
- r = Retired
- d = Defaulted

=== Draw ===
First round
5	(Sweden) F Bergevi (Netherlands) M Veldheer	6	3	[10]
Alt	(Spain) N Álvarez Varona (United States) Em Nava	4	6	[4]
Alt	(Switzerland) J Kym (Germany) R Molleker	7^{7}	6
(Romania) A Jecan (Italy) G Ricca	6^{5}	2
4	(Italy) M Bortolotti (Finland) P Niklas-Salminen	6	6
(Argentina) S Rodríguez Taverna (Ukraine) V Uzhylovskyi	2	0
(Denmark) J Ingildsen (Czech Republic) M Vocel	6^{4}	5
(Israel) D Cukierman (India) D Sharan	7^{7}	7
(France) G Blancaneaux (France) L Sanchez	6	6
(Lithuania) E Butvilas (Jordan) A Shelbayh	4	0
(Ukraine) D Molchanov (Austria) D Pichler	6	6
3	(India) J Nedunchezhiyan (India) VS Prashanth	4	0
Alt	(Austria) S Kopp (Netherlands) J Sels	6	7
WC	(Finland) Vesa Ahti (Finland) O Paldanius	4	5
WC	(Norway) V Durasovic (Finland) Patrick Kaukovalta	1	3
2	(Monaco) R Arneodo (France) T Arribagé	6	6

Quarterfinals
5	(Sweden) F Bergevi (Netherlands) M Veldheer	w/o
Alt	(Switzerland) J Kym (Germany) R Molleker
4	(Italy) M Bortolotti (Finland) P Niklas-Salminen	3	6	[10]
(Israel) D Cukierman (India) D Sharan	6	4	[8]
(France) G Blancaneaux (France) L Sanchez	4	4
(Ukraine) D Molchanov (Austria) D Pichler	6	6
Alt	(Austria) S Kopp (Netherlands) J Sels	6	6^{7}	[5]
2	(Monaco) R Arneodo (France) T Arribagé	4	7^{9}	[10]

Semifinals
5	(Sweden) F Bergevi (Netherlands) M Veldheer	6	7^{8}
4	(Italy) M Bortolotti (Finland) P Niklas-Salminen	3	6^{6}
(Ukraine) D Molchanov (Austria) D Pichler	3	0
2	(Monaco) R Arneodo (France) T Arribagé	6	6

Final
5	(Sweden) F Bergevi (Netherlands) M Veldheer	3	7^{7}	[10]
2	(Monaco) R Arneodo (France) T Arribagé	6	6^{5}	[5]
