= 2021 Belgrade Open – Singles =

Singles
- 2021 Belgrade Open

Final
- Champion: (Serbia) Novak Djokovic
- Runner-up: (Slovakia) Alex Molčan
- Score: 6–4, 6–3

Events
Singles	Doubles
Belgrade Open	· 2024 →

This was the first edition of the tournament, primarily created due to the one-week delay of the 2021 French Open.

Novak Djokovic won the title, defeating Alex Molčan in the final, 6–4, 6–3. It was Djokovic's third title ever in a tournament held in Serbia (excluding the Davis Cup).

== Seeds ==
The top four seeds receive a bye into the second round.

1. (Serbia) Novak Djokovic (champion)
2. (France) Gaël Monfils (second round)
3. (Georgia (country)) Nikoloz Basilashvili (second round)
4. (France) Adrian Mannarino (second round)
5. (Serbia) Dušan Lajović (quarterfinals)
6. (Serbia) Filip Krajinović (withdrew)
7. (Serbia) Miomir Kecmanović (first round)
8. (Argentina) Federico Delbonis (semifinals)

== Draw ==
=== Key ===
- Q = Qualifier
- WC = Wild card
- LL = Lucky loser
- Alt = Alternate
- SE = Special exempt
- PR = Protected ranking
- ITF = ITF entry
- JE = Junior exempt
- w/o = Walkover
- r = Retired
- d = Defaulted
- SR = Special ranking

=== Finals ===
Semifinals
1	(Serbia) Novak Djokovic	6	4	6
Q	(Slovakia) Andrej Martin	1	6	0
Q	(Slovakia) Alex Molčan	4	6	6
8	(Argentina) Federico Delbonis	6	4	4

Final
1	(Serbia) Novak Djokovic	6	6
Q	(Slovakia) Alex Molčan	4	3

=== Top half ===
First round
LL	(Germany) M Moraing	4	7^{9}	7
(Belarus) E Gerasimov	6	6^{7}	5
WC	(Serbia) M Topo	6	2	0
Alt	(Argentina) F Coria	4	6	6
(Uruguay) P Cuevas	6	6
7	(Serbia) M Kecmanović	3	2
Q	(Australia) C O'Connell	6	6^{7}	5
Q	(Slovakia) A Martin	3	7^{9}	7
(United States) T Sandgren	4	2
(France) J Chardy	6	6
(Lithuania) R Berankis	3	3
5	(Serbia) D Lajović	6	6

Second round
1	(Serbia) N Djokovic	6	7^{7}
LL	(Germany) M Moraing	2	6^{4}
Alt	(Argentina) F Coria	6	6
(Uruguay) P Cuevas	3	2
3	(Georgia (country)) N Basilashvili	1	6	6^{4}
Q	(Slovakia) A Martin	6	4	7^{7}
(France) J Chardy	3	4
5	(Serbia) D Lajović	6	6

Quarterfinals
1	(Serbia) N Djokovic	6	6
Alt	(Argentina) F Coria	1	0
Q	(Slovakia) A Martin	3	6	6
5	(Serbia) D Lajović	6	3	4

Semifinals
1	(Serbia) N Djokovic	6	4	6
Q	(Slovakia) A Martin	1	6	0

=== Bottom half ===
First round
Q	(Slovakia) A Molčan	6	6
WC	(Serbia) H Međedović	4	3
WC	(Serbia) P Krstin	6	3	6
(South Korea) S-w Kwon	2	6	1
(France) L Pouille	5	2
(Spain) F Verdasco	7	6
8	(Argentina) F Delbonis	3	6	6
LL	(Slovakia) L Klein	6	3	4
(Moldova) R Albot	2	2
(Brazil) T Monteiro	6	6
SE	(France) A Rinderknech	0	4
Q	(Spain) R Carballés Baena	6	6

Second round
Q	(Slovakia) A Molčan	6	6
WC	(Serbia) P Krstin	0	0
(Spain) F Verdasco	7^{7}	6
4	(France) A Mannarino	6^{4}	0
8	(Argentina) F Delbonis	7^{8}	3	6
(Brazil) T Monteiro	6^{6}	6	4
Q	(Spain) R Carballés Baena	6	3	7^{7}
2	(France) G Monfils	1	6	6^{4}

Quarterfinals
Q	(Slovakia) A Molčan	6	6
(Spain) F Verdasco	2	0
8	(Argentina) F Delbonis	w/o
Q	(Spain) R Carballés Baena

Semifinals
Q	(Slovakia) A Molčan	4	6	6
8	(Argentina) F Delbonis	6	4	4

== Qualifying ==
=== Seeds ===
1. (Argentina) Federico Coria (moved to main draw)
2. (Spain) Roberto Carballés Baena (qualified)
3. (Slovakia) Andrej Martin (qualified)
4. (Australia) Christopher O'Connell (qualified)
5. (Germany) Mats Moraing (qualifying competition, lucky loser)
6. (Slovakia) Lukáš Klein (qualifying competition, lucky loser)
7. (Czech Republic) Vít Kopřiva (qualifying competition)
8. (Slovakia) Alex Molčan (qualified)

=== Qualifiers ===
1. (Slovakia) Alex Molčan
2. (Spain) Roberto Carballés Baena
3. (Slovakia) Andrej Martin
4. (Australia) Christopher O'Connell

=== Lucky losers ===
1. (Germany) Mats Moraing
2. (Slovakia) Lukáš Klein

=== Qualifying draw ===
==== First qualifier ====
First round
Alt	(Australia) John-Patrick Smith	4	6^{5}
WC	(Spain) Carlos Gómez-Herrera	6	7^{7}
Alt	(Bosnia and Herzegovina) Nerman Fatić	4	1
8	(Slovakia) Alex Molčan	6	6

Qualifying competition
WC	(Spain) Carlos Gómez-Herrera	3	6^{8}
8	(Slovakia) Alex Molčan	6	7^{10}

==== Second qualifier ====
First round
2	(Spain) Roberto Carballés Baena	6	6
(Bosnia and Herzegovina) Mirza Bašić	2	3
(Russia) Alexey Vatutin	3	6	4
7	(Czech Republic) Vít Kopřiva	6	3	6

Qualifying competition
2	(Spain) Roberto Carballés Baena	6	6
7	(Czech Republic) Vít Kopřiva	4	4

==== Third qualifier ====
First round
3	(Slovakia) Andrej Martin	6	6
(Australia) Akira Santillan	3	3
(Tunisia) Malek Jaziri	3	4
5	(Germany) Mats Moraing	6	6

Qualifying competition
3	(Slovakia) Andrej Martin	6	6
5	(Germany) Mats Moraing	1	3

==== Fourth qualifier ====
First round
4	(Australia) Christopher O'Connell	6	6
(Barbados) Darian King	1	3
WC	(Serbia) Marko Tepavac	4	1
6	(Slovakia) Lukáš Klein	6	6

Qualifying competition
4	(Australia) Christopher O'Connell	7^{9}	7
6	(Slovakia) Lukáš Klein	6^{7}	5
