= 2021 Belgrade Open =

- Date: 23–29 May
- Edition: 1st
- Category: ATP Tour 250
- Draw: 28S / 16D
- Prize money: €255,500
- Surface: Clay
- Location: Belgrade, Serbia
- Venue: Novak Tennis Center

Champions

Singles
- (Serbia) Novak Djokovic

Doubles
- (Israel) Jonathan Erlich / (Belarus) Andrei Vasilevski
- Belgrade Open

The 2021 Belgrade Open was a tournament on the 2021 ATP Tour. It was played on outdoor clay courts in Belgrade, Serbia. It was organised with a single-year licence in 2021, and was held at Novak Tennis Center from May 23 to 29, 2021.

== Champions ==
=== Singles ===
- (Serbia) Novak Djokovic def. (Slovakia) Alex Molčan, 6–4, 6–3

=== Doubles ===
- (Israel) Jonathan Erlich / (Belarus) Andrei Vasilevski def. (Sweden) André Göransson / (Brazil) Rafael Matos, 6–4, 6–1
