= Alex Molčan =

Slovak tennis player

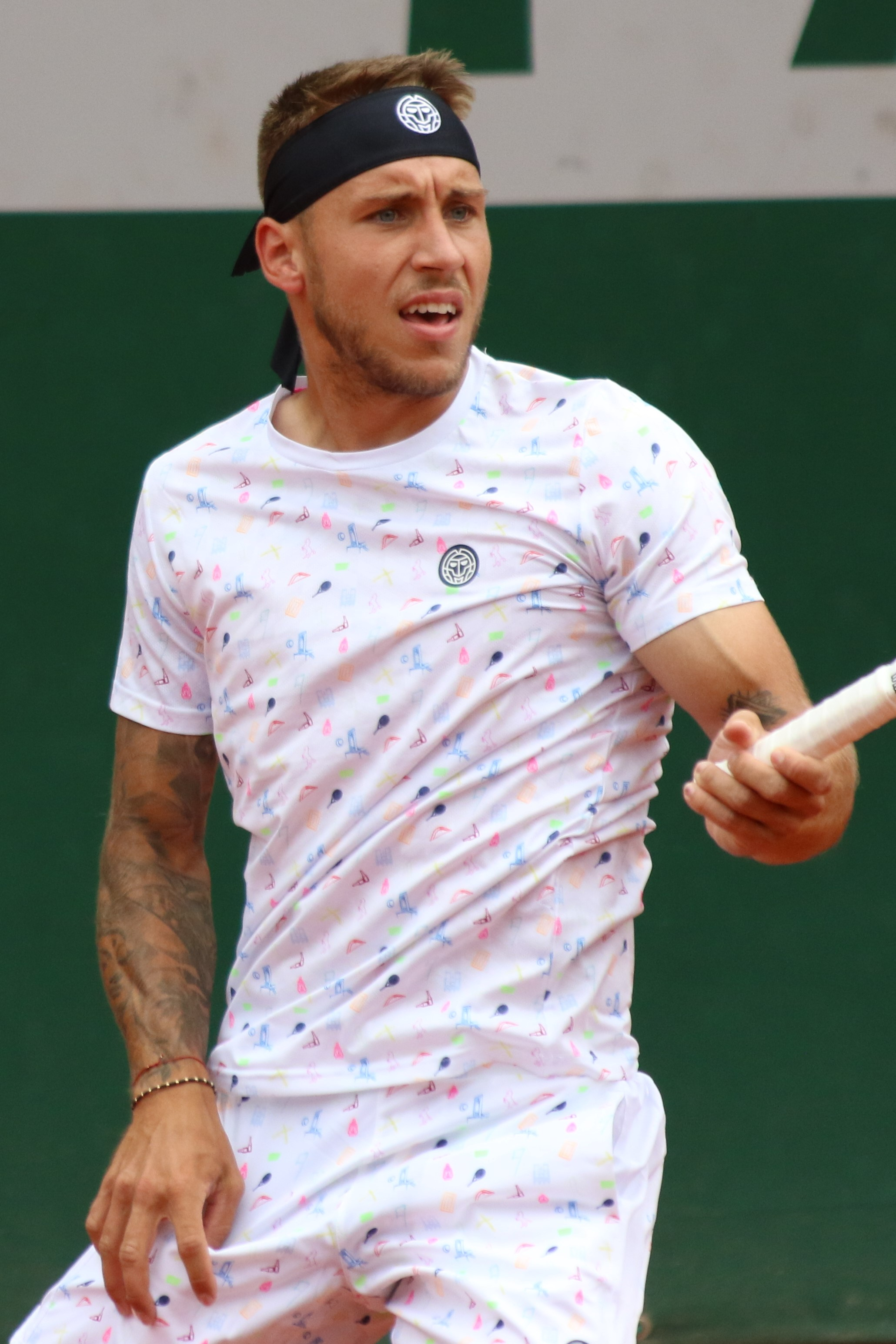
- Molčan at the 2022 French Open
- Country (sports): Slovakia
- Born: 1 December 1997 (age 28) Prešov, Slovakia
- Height: 1.78 m (5 ft 10 in)
- Turned pro: 2015
- Plays: Left-handed (two-handed backhand)
- Coach: Karol Beck, Marián Vajda
- Prize money: US $3,103,045

Singles
- Career record: 66–54
- Career titles: 0
- Highest ranking: No. 38 (23 May 2022)
- Current ranking: No. 72 (9 November 2026)

Grand Slam singles results
- Australian Open: 2R (2022, 2023)
- French Open: 2R (2022, 2023)
- Wimbledon: 3R (2022)
- US Open: 3R (2021)

Doubles
- Career record: 3–9
- Career titles: 0
- Highest ranking: No. 268 (14 June 2021)

Grand Slam doubles results
- Australian Open: 3R (2023)
- US Open: 1R (2022)

Team competitions
- Davis Cup: Singles: 8–4; Doubles: 0–1
- Last updated on: 7 October 2026.

Alex Molčan (born 1 December 1997) is a Slovak professional tennis player. He has a career-high ATP singles ranking of world No. 38, achieved on 23 May 2022 and a doubles ranking of No. 268, achieved on 14 June 2021. He is the current No. 1 singles player from Slovakia.

Molčan has reached three ATP 250 finals at the 2021 Belgrade Open, and in Morocco and in Lyon in 2022.

== Professional career ==
=== 2020–21: ATP final, Major debut & third round, Slovak No. 1, top 100 ===
Ranked No. 313 at the beginning of the year in January, Molčan made his ATP debut at the 2021 Antalya Open in Turkey, where he defeated Andrey Golubev and Blaž Kavčič to qualify for the main draw. Molčan then lost in the first round to France's Hugo Grenier in straight sets. In February he won the doubles title at the 2021 Challenger La Manche with compatriot Lukáš Klein.

In March, he advanced through the qualifying rounds of Open 13 in Marseille, France, defeating Antoine Hoang and Ernests Gulbis to reach his second main draw appearance. He was defeated in the first round by Lucas Pouille.

In May, ranked world No. 255 at the 2021 Belgrade Open, after qualifying yet again, Molčan reached the final of an ATP tournament for the first time in his career by defeating two Serbian wildcard players Hamad Međedović and Peđa Krstin, Spaniard Fernando Verdasco and clay specialist Argentinian Federico Delbonis which propelled him 74 spots up into the top 200 at World No. 181 in the rankings on 31 May 2021. In the final, he lost in straight sets to the top seed and world No. 1 Novak Djokovic.

He entered the top 150 on 19 July 2021 after reaching the final of the 2021 Moneta Czech Open Challenger in Prostějov, and the round of 16 as a qualifier at the 2021 Hamburg European Open defeating Gianluca Mager. In August, he won his first Challenger title at the 2021 Svijany Open in Liberec defeating Tomáš Macháč in 58 minutes where he lost just 18 games to win the title. As a result, he hit a new career-high of No. 136 on 9 August 2021.

He made his Grand Slam debut the 2021 US Open after qualifying to the main draw. He overcame fellow qualifier and also making his debut Cem İlkel and Brandon Nakashima in five sets to reach the second and third round respectively for the first time in his career. In the third round, he was defeated by the eleventh seed Diego Schwartzman in straight sets. As a result, he hit a new career-high of No. 117 on 13 September 2021. He became the No. 1 Slovak player on 8 November 2021 when he reached a career-high of No. 106 in the singles rankings following a semifinal at the Challenger in Bergamo. In November, he won the title at the 2021 Tali Open Challenger in Helsinki thus breaking into the top 100 at world No. 87 in the ATP year-end rankings on 22 November 2021.

=== 2022: Top 40, two ATP 250 finals & 500 semifinal, Wimbledon third round ===
He reached a career-high ranking in the top 75 at World No. 74 on 10 January 2022.

On his debut at the 2022 Australian Open he recorded his first win at this Major defeating lucky loser Roman Safiullin in the first round.

In Marrakesh, Molčan recorded his first Top 10 win after defeating the top seed Félix Auger-Aliassime. He then advanced to his second career ATP final by defeating Botic van de Zandschulp and Laslo Djere. In the final, Molčan lost to David Goffin in 3 sets. As a result, Molčan's ranking rose 15 places, marking his top 50 debut on 11 April 2022.

At the 2022 ATP Lyon Open he reached the third tour-level final of his career, and second of the season by defeating former World No. 5 wildcard Jo-Wilfried Tsonga, 5th seed Karen Khachanov, Federico Coria and 4th seed Alex de Minaur en route without losing a set. He lost to top seed Cameron Norrie in three sets in the final. As a result, he moved into the top 40 at World No. 38 on 23 May 2022.

He made his debut at the 2022 Wimbledon Championships and won his first match at this Major defeating Pedro Martínez. He reached the third round at this Major for the first time defeating Marcos Giron in the second round before losing to Taylor Fritz.

In Hamburg, Molčan reached the quarterfinals as an unseeded player, beating Marko Topo and 4th seed and defending champion Pablo Carreño Busta. He advanced to the biggest semifinal of his career after Borna Ćorić retired during their match with Molčan leading in the second set. He lost to Carlos Alcaraz in straight sets.

At the US Open he lost in the first round to Thiago Monteiro. In September he won his two matches in the 2022 Davis Cup World Group I against Romania.

=== 2023–25: Masters third rounds, hiatus, surgery, out of top 500 ===
Molča started his 2023 season at the Maharashtra Open in Pune. Seeded fifth, he lost in the first round to Laslo Djere. At the ASB Classic in Auckland, he was defeated in the first round by Quentin Halys. At the Australian Open, he earned his first win of the year by beating 2014 champion, Stan Wawrinka, in the first round in a five-set thriller. He lost in the second round to sixth seed and world No. 7, Félix Auger-Aliassime. After the Australian Open, Molča represented Slovakia in the Davis Cup tie against the Netherlands. He lost to Tim van Rijthoven. In the end, the Netherlands won the tie over Slovakia 4–0.

Seeded seventh at the Argentina Open, he fell in the first round to two-time champion Dominic Thiem. Seeded ninth at the Rio Open, he lost in the second round to Hugo Dellien. In Acapulco, he retired during his first-round match against Matteo Berrettini due to injury. In March, he competed at the BNP Paribas Open. Making his debut at this tournament, he defeated Albert Ramos Viñolas and upset 18th seed and world No. 20, Borna Ćorić, in the second round to reach the third round of a Masters for the first time in his career. He was defeated in the third round by Márton Fucsovics. At the following tournament, the 2023 Miami Open, he reached in two weeks back-to-back third rounds of a Masters 1000, defeating Jordan Thompson and upset 28th seed Yoshihito Nishioka. He withdrew from his third round match against world No. 5 Daniil Medvedev due to a right hip injury. At the Banja Luka Open he defeated Taro Daniel, Alexei Popyrin and Laslo Djere to reach the semifinals, where he was defeated by Andrey Rublev.

At the 2023 US Open he lost to Grigor Dimitrov, after leading two sets to love, in five sets with three tiebreaks, in a match lasting close to 4 hours and 40 minutes, the longest of the day and the tournament thus far.

As a part of Slovak Davis Cup team, Molčan helped to defeat Greece. He won both his singles matches, including a win against Stefanos Tsitsipas.

He finished the 2023 season outside of the top 100, ranked No. 119. He further fell out of the top 150 at world No. 162 on 1 April 2024 and out of the top 600 down to No. 646 on 31 March 2025. He returned to the top 300 on 25 August 2025, following winning the Challenger title at the 2025 Genesis Cup II in Sofia, Bulgaria, over Joel Schwärzler.

=== 2026: First ATP 500 semifinal in 3 years, back to top 100 ===
In April, Molčan qualified for the main draw and defeated top seed Gabriel Diallo in Bucharest, but lost to Mariano Navone in the quarterfinals. Next, Molčan reached the semifinals at the 2026 BMW Open in Munich, as a qualifier, after defeating third seed Alexander Bublik, Daniel Altmaier and Denis Shapovalov, before losing to eventual champion Ben Shelton. As a result Molčan significantly improved his ranking to No. 107 on 20 April 2026, and into the top 100 three months later, on 20 July 2026 after he reached the quarterfinals, and subsequently the semifinals at the 2026 Croatia Open Umag.

== Coaching ==
Molčan hired fellow Slovak Marián Vajda to join his coaching team in May 2022. Molčan and Vajda ended their coaching partnership in September 2023, after an up and down season.

== Performance timelines ==
Key
W	F	SF	QF	#R	RR	Q#	P#	DNQ	A	Z#	PO	G	S	B	NMS	NTI	P	NH

(W) winner; (F) finalist; (SF) semifinalist; (QF) quarterfinalist; (#R) rounds 4, 3, 2, 1; (RR) round-robin stage; (Q#) qualification round; (P#) preliminary round; (DNQ) did not qualify; (A) absent; (Z#) Davis/Fed Cup Zonal Group (with number indication) or (PO) play-off; (G) gold, (S) silver or (B) bronze Olympic/Paralympic medal; (NMS) not a Masters tournament; (NTI) not a Tier I tournament; (P) postponed; (NH) not held; (SR) strike rate (events won / competed); (W–L) win–loss record.
To avoid confusion and double counting, these charts are updated at the conclusion of a tournament or when the player's participation has ended.

== Performance timeline ==
Key
W	F	SF	QF	#R	RR	Q#	DNQ	A	NH

(W) winner; (F) finalist; (SF) semifinalist; (QF) quarterfinalist; (#R) rounds 4, 3, 2, 1; (RR) round-robin stage; (Q#) qualification round; (DNQ) did not qualify; (A) absent; (NH) not held; (SR) strike rate (events won / competed); (W–L) win–loss record.
To avoid confusion and double counting, these charts are updated at the conclusion of a tournament or when the player's participation has ended.

=== Singles ===
Tournament	2020	2021	2022	2023	2024	2025	2026	SR	W–L	Win %
Grand Slam tournaments
Australian Open	A	A	2R	2R	Q3	A	Q2	0 / 2	2–2	50%
French Open	A	A	2R	2R	Q1	A	Q2	0 / 2	2–2	50%
Wimbledon	A	Q3	3R	1R	A	A	2R	0 / 3	3–3	50%
US Open	A	3R	1R	1R	A	A	1R	0 / 4	2–4	33%
Win–loss	0–0	2–1	4–4	2–4	0–0	0–0	1–2	0 / 11	9–11	45%
ATP Masters 1000
Indian Wells Masters	NH	A	A	3R (Note: Alex Molčan withdrew in the third round, which does not count as a loss.)	Q2	A	A	0 / 1	2–1	67%
Miami Open	NH	A	A	3R	A	A	A	0 / 1	2–0	100%
Monte Carlo Masters	NH	A	A	A	A	A	A	0 / 0	0–0	–
Madrid Open	NH	A	Q1	2R	A	A	A	0 / 1	1–1	50%
Italian Open	A	A	Q1	2R	A	A	A	0 / 1	1–1	50%
Canadian Open	NH	A	2R	A	A	A	A	0 / 1	1–1	50%
Cincinnati Masters	A	A	R1	A	A	A	A	0 / 1	0–1	0%
Shanghai Masters	NH			A	A	A	2R (Note: Alex Molčan withdrew in the second round, which does not count as a loss.)	0 / 1	1–0	100%
Paris Masters	A	A	1R	A	A	A	2R	0 / 2	1–2	33%
Win–loss	0–0	0–0	1–3	6–3	0–0	0–0	2–1	0 / 9	9–7	56%
Career statistics
	2020	2021	2022	2023	2024	2025	2026	Career		
Tournaments	0	5	20	17	1		2	45		
Titles / Finals	0 / 0	0 / 1	0 / 2	0 / 0	0 / 0			0 / 3		
Overall win–loss	0–0	7–6	26–20	16–17	1–1	1–0	6–3	57–47	55%	
Year-end ranking	312	87	50	119	468	202				

== ATP Tour finals ==
=== Singles: 3 (3 runner-ups) ===
Legend Grand Slam (0–0) ATP 1000 (0–0) ATP 500 (0–0) ATP 250 (0–3)	Finals by surface Hard (0–0) Clay (0–3) Grass (0–0)	Finals by setting Outdoor (0–3) Indoor (0–0)

Result	W–L	Date	Tournament	Tier	Surface	Opponent	Score
Loss	0–1	May 2021	Belgrade Open, Serbia	ATP 250	Clay	(Serbia) Novak Djokovic	4–6, 3–6
Loss	0–2	Apr 2022	Grand Prix Hassan II, Morocco	ATP 250	Clay	(Belgium) David Goffin	6–3, 3–6, 3–6
Loss	0–3	May 2022	Lyon Open, France	ATP 250	Clay	(United Kingdom) Cameron Norrie	3–6, 7–6^{(7–3)}, 1–6

== ATP Challenger and ITF Tour finals ==
=== Singles: 17 (11 titles, 6 runner-ups) ===
Legend ATP Challenger Tour (4–3) ITF Futures/WTT (7–3)	Finals by surface Hard (3–2) Clay (8–4)

Result	W–L	Date	Tournament	Tier	Surface	Opponent	Score
Loss	0–1	Sep 2018	Seville, Spain	Challenger	Clay	(Belgium) Kimmer Coppejans	6–7^{(2–7)}, 1–6
Loss	0–2	Jun 2021	Prostějov, Czechia	Challenger	Clay	(Argentina) Federico Coria	6–7^{(1–7)}, 3–6
Win	1–2	Aug 2021	Liberec, Czechia	Challenger	Clay	(Czech Republic) Tomáš Macháč	6–0, 6–1
Win	2–2	Nov 2021	Helsinki, Finland	Challenger	Hard (i)	(Portugal) João Sousa	6–3, 6–2
Win	3–2	Aug 2025	Sofia, Bulgaria	Challenger	Clay	(Austria) Joel Schwärzler	7–5, 6–4
Win	4–2	Sep 2025	Istanbul, Turkey	Challenger	Hard	(Colombia) Nicolás Mejía	7–6^{(11–9)}, 6–2
Loss	4–3	Jun 2026	Prostějov, Czech Republic	Challenger	Clay	(Argentina) Sebastián Báez	4–6, 2–6
Loss	0–1	Oct 2015	Turkey F41, Antalya	Futures	Hard	(Russia) Kirill Dmitriev	2–6, 6–0, 4–6
Win	1–1	Oct 2016	Turkey F41, Antalya	Futures	Hard	(Serbia) Nikola Milojević	6–4, 7–5
Loss	1–2	Mar 2017	Egypt F7, Sharm El Sheikh	Futures	Hard	(Egypt) Karim-Mohamed Maamoun	0–6, 3–6
Loss	1–3	Jul 2017	Czechia F5, Pardubice	Futures	Clay	(Austria) Dennis Novak	6–7^{(3–7)}, 3–6
Win	2–3	Jul 2018	Slovakia F1, Trnava	Futures	Clay	(Czech Republic) Tomáš Jiroušek	7–6^{(7–5)}, 6–3
Win	3–3	Aug 2018	Slovakia F2, Piešťany	Futures	Clay	(United Kingdom) Ewan Moore	6–3, 6–2
Win	4–3	Aug 2018	Slovakia F3, Bratislava	Futures	Clay	(Czech Republic) Petr Nouza	6–4, 6–3
Win	5–3	Apr 2025	M15 Antalya, Turkey	WTT	Clay	(Ukraine) Oleksii Krutykh	6–1, 3–6, 6–4
Win	6–3	Apr 2025	M15 Antalya, Turkey	WTT	Clay	(Belgium) Gilles Arnaud Bailly	6–0, 6–2
Win	7–3	May 2025	M25 Reggio Emilia, Italy	WTT	Clay	(United Kingdom) Kyle Edmund	6–2, 6–1

=== Doubles: 5 (2 titles, 3 runner-ups) ===
Legend ATP Challenger Tour (1–3) ITF Futures (1–0)	Finals by surface Hard (2–1) Clay (0–2)

Result	W–L	Date	Tournament	Tier	Surface	Partner	Opponents	Score
Loss	0–1	Feb 2019	Bratislava, Slovakia	Challenger	Clay	(Slovakia) Lukáš Klein	(Belgium) Joran Vliegen (Belgium) Sander Gillé	2–6, 5–7
Loss	0–2	Nov 2020	Bratislava, Slovakia	Challenger	Hard (i)	(Slovakia) Lukáš Klein	(Finland) Harri Heliövaara (Finland) Emil Ruusuvuori	4–6, 3–6
Win	1–2	Feb 2021	Cherbourg, France	Challenger	Hard (i)	(Slovakia) Lukáš Klein	(France) Albano Olivetti (France) Antoine Hoang	1–6, 7–5, [10–6]
Loss	1–3	Mar 2021	Zadar, Croatia	Challenger	Clay	(Slovakia) Lukáš Klein	(Slovenia) Blaž Kavčič (Slovenia) Blaž Rola	6–2, 3–6, [3–10]
Win	1–0	Feb 2016	Turkey F6, Antalya	Futures	Hard	(Slovakia) Lukáš Klein	(Ukraine) Vadim Alekseenko (Portugal) Frederico Ferreira Silva	7–6^{(9–7)}, 7–6^{(7–5)}

== Junior Grand Slam finals ==
=== Doubles: 1 (runner–up) ===
Result	Year	Tournament	Surface	Partner	Opponent	Score
Loss	2015	Australian Open	Hard	(Poland) Hubert Hurkacz	(Australia) Jake Delaney (Australia) Marc Polmans	6–0, 2–6, [8–10]
