= Filip Bergevi =

Swedish tennis player

- Country (sports): Sweden
- Born: 20 April 1994 (age 32) Åhus, Sweden
- Height: 1.85 m (6 ft 1 in)
- Retired: 2025
- Plays: Right-handed (two-handed backhand)
- College: University of California, Berkeley
- Prize money: $127,105

Singles
- Career record: 0–0 (at ATP Tour level, Grand Slam level, and in Davis Cup)
- Career titles: 1 ITF
- Highest ranking: No. 568 (21 October 2019)

Doubles
- Career record: 3–12 (at ATP Tour level, Grand Slam level, and in Davis Cup)
- Career titles: 4 Challengers, 11 ITF
- Highest ranking: No. 116 (11 November 2024)

Filip Bergevi (born 20 April 1994) is a Swedish former tennis player. He has a career-high ATP doubles ranking of world No. 116 achieved on 11 November 2024 and a career-high ATP singles ranking of No. 568 was achieved in 21 October 2019.

Bergevi played college tennis at the University of California, Berkeley.

== Career ==
Bergevi made his ATP main draw debut at the 2012 Swedish Open in the doubles draw partnering Fred Simonsson.

He received a wildcard at the 2023 Stockholm Open partnering Leo Borg.

In November 2024 he won his last to date ATP Challenger doubles tournament and reached his best ranking at number 116 in the ATP rankings.

He retired in February 2025 after playing in a Davis Cup tie against Australia, and became a coach in an important Danish tennis center.

== ATP Challenger and ITF titles ==
=== Singles: 1 ===
Legend
ATP Challenger (0)
ITF Futures / World Tennis Tour (1)

No.	Date	Tournament	Tier	Surface	Opponent	Score
1.	Feb 2019	M15 Sharm El Sheikh, Egypt	World Tennis Tour	Hard	(China) Sun Fajing	7–6^{(7–4)}, 7–6^{(7–2)}

=== Doubles: 16 ===
Legend
ATP Challenger (4)
ITF Futures / World Tennis Tour (12)

No.	Date	Tournament	Tier	Surface	Partner	Opponents	Score
1.	Oct 2012	Sweden F7, Jönköping	Futures	Hard	(Sweden) Fred Simonsson	(Sweden) Kalle Averfalk (Sweden) Robin Olin	6–2, 6–3
2.	Jan 2018	USA F6, Palm Coast, Florida	Futures	Clay	(France) Florian Lakat	(France) Maxime Chazal (Portugal) Fred Gil	6–4, 6–1
3.	Apr 2019	M15 Tabarka, Tunisia	World Tennis Tour	Clay	(Sweden) Markus Eriksson	(Republic of Ireland) Simon Carr (France) Amaury Delmas	6–3, 6–1
4.	May 2019	M15 Karlskrona, Sweden	World Tennis Tour	Clay	(Sweden) Markus Eriksson	(United States) Justin Butsch (Sweden) Simon Freund	6–1, 6–3
5.	May 2019	M15 Kalmar, Sweden	World Tennis Tour	Clay	(Sweden) Markus Eriksson	(United States) Justin Butsch (Sweden) Simon Freund	7–5, 6–2
6.	Sep 2019	M25 Stockholm, Sweden	World Tennis Tour	Hard	(France) Florian Lakat	(Poland) Jan Zieliński (Poland) Kacper Żuk	6–3, 7–6^{(7–3)}
7.	Aug 2021	M15 Łódź, Poland	World Tennis Tour	Clay	(Sweden) Markus Eriksson	(Latvia) Kārlis Ozoliņš (Greece) Aristotelis Thanos	4–6, 6–2, [10–4]
8.	Aug 2021	M25 Poznań, Poland	World Tennis Tour	Clay	(Sweden) Markus Eriksson	(Argentina) Leonardo Aboian (Argentina) Valerio Aboian	w/o
9.	Oct 2021	M15 Pärnu, Estonia	World Tennis Tour	Hard (i)	(Finland) Patrik Niklas-Salminen	(Estonia) Vladimir Ivanov (Estonia) Kenneth Raisma	4–6, 7–6^{(7–4)}, [10–8]
10.	Nov 2021	M15 Heraklion, Greece	World Tennis Tour	Hard	(Germany) Kai Wehnelt	(South Korea) Park Ui-sung (United Kingdom) Harry Wendelken	7–6^{(10–8)}, 4–6, [10–7]
11.	Jan 2022	M15 Cancún, Mexico	World Tennis Tour	Hard	(Netherlands) Mick Veldheer	(France) Constantin Bittoun Kouzmine (Mexico) Luis Patiño	6–4, 6–4
12.	Jan 2023	M25 Manacor, Spain	World Tennis Tour	Hard	(Luxembourg) Alex Knaff	(Spain) Alberto Barroso Campos (Spain) Imanol Lopez Morillo	3–6, 6–3, [16–14]
13.	Mar 2023	Antalya, Turkey	Challenger	Clay	(Greece) Petros Tsitsipas	(Turkey) Sarp Ağabigün (Turkey) Ergi Kırkın	6–2, 6–4
14.	Dec 2023	Yokohama, Japan	Challenger	Hard	(Netherlands) Mick Veldheer	(Chinese Taipei) Ray Ho (Australia) Calum Puttergill	2–6, 7–5, [11–9]
15.	Apr 2024	Oeiras, Portugal	Challenger	Clay	(Netherlands) Mick Veldheer	(Spain) Sergio Martos Gornés (Greece) Petros Tsitsipas	6–1, 6–4
16.	Nov 2024	Helsinki, Finland	Challenger	Hard (i)	(Netherlands) Mick Veldheer	(Monaco) R Arneodo (France) T Arribagé	3–6, 7– 6^{(7-5)}, [10–5]
