= HPP Open =

- 2026 HPP Open

ATP Challenger Tour
- Event name: HPP Open
- Location: Helsinki, Finland
- Venue: Tali Tennis Center
- Category: ATP Challenger Tour 125
- Surface: Hard (Indoor)
- Draw: 48S/4Q/16D
- Prize money: €148,625
- Website: website

The HPP Open is a professional tennis tournament played on indoor hardcourts. It is currently part of the ATP Challenger Tour. It is held annually in Helsinki, Finland, since 2019.

== Past finals ==
=== Singles ===
Year	Champion	Runner-up	Score
2026	(United Kingdom) Toby Samuel	(Finland) Otto Virtanen	7–6^{(7–3)}, 6–2
2025	(United States) Patrick Kypson	(Finland) Otto Virtanen	4–6, 6–3, 6–4
2024	(Japan) Kei Nishikori	(Italy) Luca Nardi	3–6, 6–4, 6–1
2023	(France) Corentin Moutet	(India) Sumit Nagal	6–3, 3–6, 6–2
2022	(Switzerland) Leandro Riedi	(Czech Republic) Tomáš Macháč	6–3, 6–1
2021	(Slovakia) Alex Molčan	(Portugal) João Sousa	6–3, 6–2
2020	Not Held		
2019	(Finland) Emil Ruusuvuori	(Egypt) Mohamed Safwat	6–3, 6–7^{(4–7)}, 6–2

=== Doubles ===
Year	Champions	Runners-up	Score
2026	(Netherlands) Jean-Julien Rojer (United States) Theodore Winegar	(United Kingdom) Luke Johnson (New Zealand) Michael Venus	7–6^{(7–5)}, 6–1
2025	(Germany) Jakob Schnaitter (Germany) Mark Wallner	(Romania) Alexandru Jecan (Romania) Bogdan Pavel	6–2, 4–6, [10–6]
2024	(Sweden) Filip Bergevi (Netherlands) Mick Veldheer	(Monaco) Romain Arneodo (France) Théo Arribagé	3–6, 7–6^{(7–5)}, [10–5]
2023	(India) Sriram Balaji (Germany) Andre Begemann	(India) Jeevan Nedunchezhiyan (India) Vijay Sundar Prashanth	6–2, 7–5
2022	(India) Purav Raja (India) Divij Sharan	(United States) Reese Stalder (Greece) Petros Tsitsipas	6–7^{(5–7)}, 6–3, [10–8]
2021	(Austria) Alexander Erler (Austria) Lucas Miedler	(Finland) Harri Heliövaara (Netherlands) Jean-Julien Rojer	6–3, 7–6^{(7–2)}
2020	Not Held		
2019	(Denmark) Frederik Nielsen (Germany) Tim Pütz	(Croatia) Tomislav Draganja (Russia) Pavel Kotov	7–6^{(7–2)}, 6–0
