= Eero Vasa =

Finnish tennis player (born 1997)

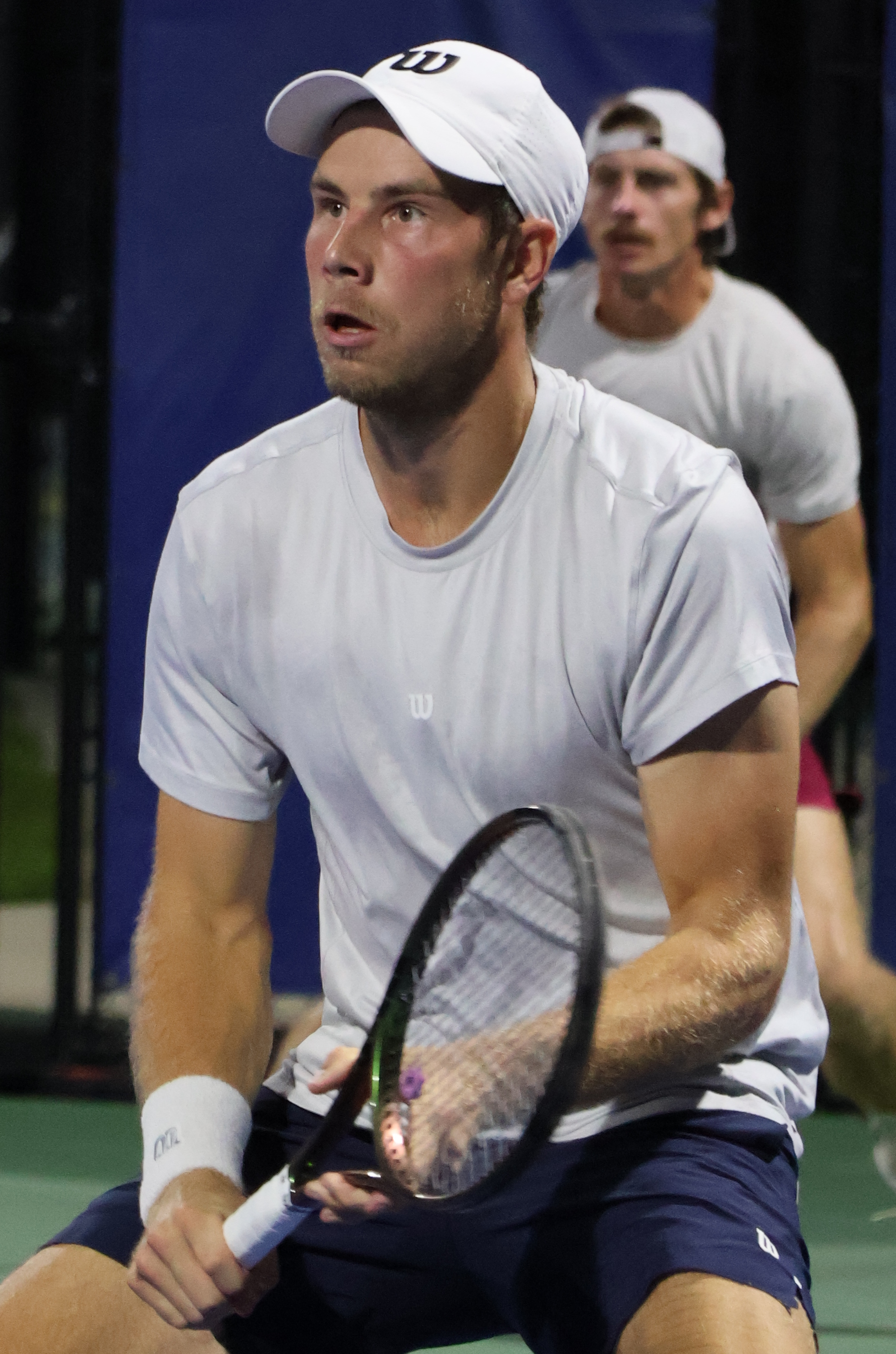
- Vasa at the 2023 Cary Challenger II
- Country (sports): Finland
- Residence: Finland
- Born: 1 February 1997 (age 29) Turku, Finland
- Height: 1.85 m (6 ft 1 in)
- Plays: Right-handed (two handed-backhand)
- Coach: Jarkko Haataja
- Prize money: US $119,313

Singles
- Career record: 2–11
- Career titles: 0
- Highest ranking: No. 424 (25 May 2026)
- Current ranking: No. 473 (19 October 2026)

Grand Slam singles results
- Wimbledon Junior: Q1 (2015)

Doubles
- Career record: 0–0
- Career titles: 0
- Highest ranking: No. 237 (24 June 2024)
- Current ranking: No. 523 (19 October 2026)

Team competitions
- Davis Cup: 1–5
- Last updated on: 19 October 2026.

Eero Vasa (born 1 February 1997) is a Finnish tennis player. He has a career high ATP singles ranking of world No. 424 achieved on 25 May 2026 and a career high ATP doubles ranking of No. 237 achieved on 24 June 2024.

Vasa has represented Finland in the Davis Cup, where he has a W/L record of 2–9.

== Career ==
=== Juniors ===
On the junior tour Vasa has a career high ranking of No. 52 achieved on 19 January 2015.

== ITF World Tennis Tour finals ==
=== Singles: 4 (1 title, 3 runner-ups) ===
Legend ITF WTT (1–3)

Result	W–L	Date	Tournament	Tier	Surface	Opponent	Score
Loss	0–1	May 2024	M15 Kalmar, Sweden	WTT	Clay	(France) Lucas Bouquet	1–6, 5–7
Loss	0–2	Sep 2024	M25 Falun, Sweden	WTT	Clay	(Sweden) Olle Wallin	3–6, 3–6
Loss	0–3	May 2025	M15 Kotka, Finland	WTT	Clay	(Germany) Tom Gentzsch	3–6, 5–7
Win	1–3	Jul 2025	M15 Łódź, Poland	WTT	Clay	(Poland) Tomasz Berkieta	6–2, 6–2
