= Otto Virtanen =

Finnish tennis player (born 2001)

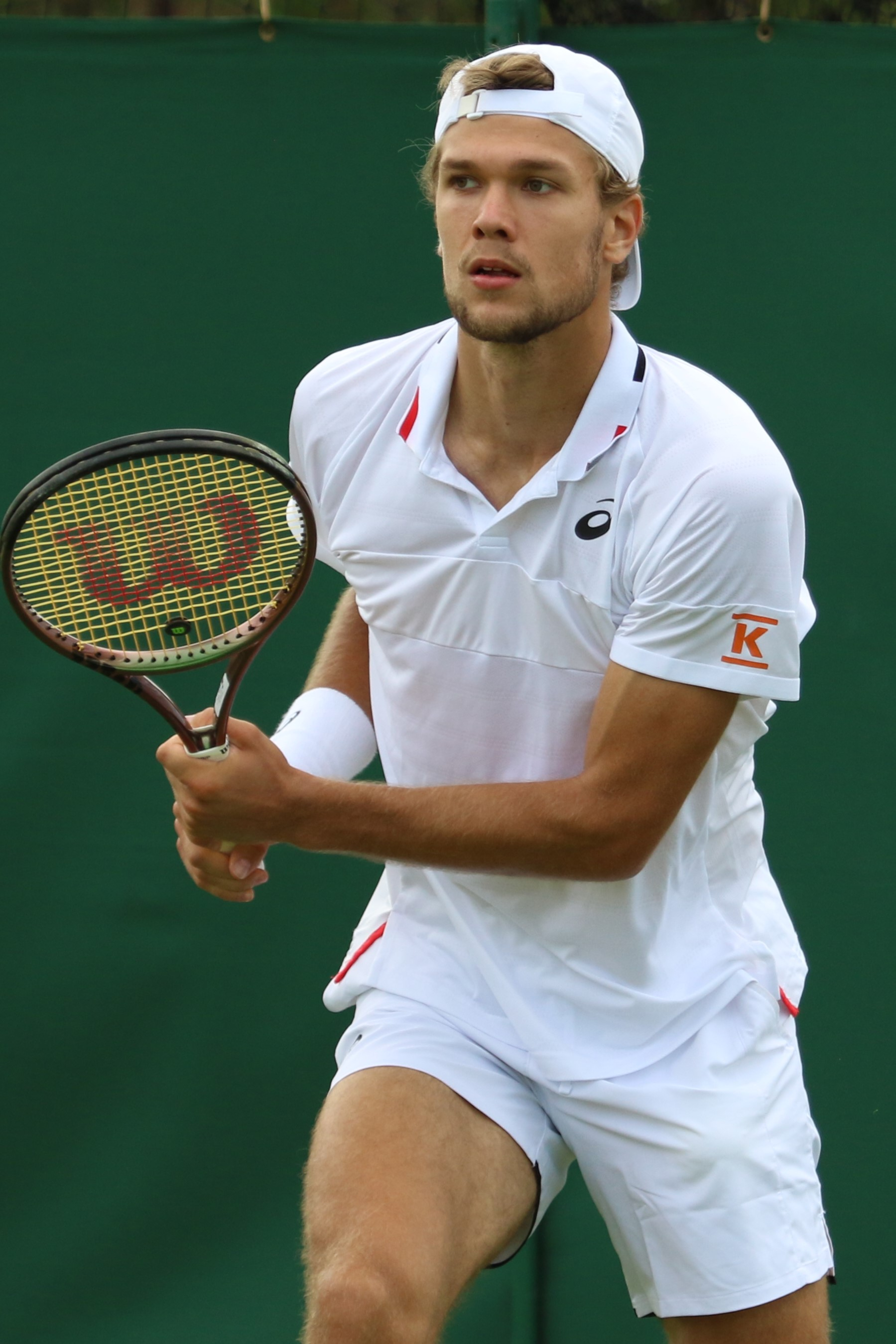
- Virtanen at the 2023 Wimbledon Championships
- Country (sports): Finland
- Residence: Helsinki, Finland
- Born: 21 June 2001 (age 25) Hyvinkää, Finland
- Height: 1.93 m (6 ft 4 in)
- Turned pro: 2018
- Plays: Right-handed (two-handed backhand)
- Coach: Pasi Virtanen
- Prize money: US $2,127,274

Singles
- Career record: 19–29
- Career titles: 0
- Highest ranking: No. 91 (11 November 2024)
- Current ranking: No. 107 (16 November 2026)

Grand Slam singles results
- Australian Open: 1R (2025)
- French Open: 1R (2024)
- Wimbledon: 2R (2024, 2026)
- US Open: 2R (2024)

Doubles
- Career record: 3–3
- Career titles: 0
- Highest ranking: No. 243 (19 June 2023)

Team competitions
- Davis Cup: SF (2023)
- Last updated on: 16 November 2026.

Otto Virtanen (born 21 June 2001) is a Finnish professional tennis player. He has a career-high ATP singles ranking of No. 91 achieved on 11 November 2024 and a doubles ranking of No. 243 achieved on 19 June 2023. He is currently the No. 1 singles player from Finland.

Virtanen represents Finland at the Davis Cup where he has a W/L record of 10–10.

== Career ==
=== 2018: Juniors ===
Virtanen won the Boys' Doubles title in the Wimbledon Championships in 2018. In December 2018 Virtanen won the singles tournament, the Orange Bowl.

=== 2022: First Challenger title ===
Virtanen won his first Challenger title at the 2022 Trofeo Faip–Perrel and reached the top 200 at world No. 195 on 7 November 2022.

=== 2023: Top 150 and Grand Slam debuts ===
Following a second title at the 2023 Challenger Città di Lugano, he reached the top 150 at No. 139 on 20 March 2023, and a third title in Lille raised his ranking to No. 109 on 3 April 2023.

Virtanen made his Grand Slam debut at the 2023 US Open after qualifying into the main draw.

=== 2024: Roland Garros, Wimbledon debut and first win, top 100 ===
Virtanen entered the main draw of the 2024 French Open as a lucky loser, making his debut at this major. He lost to fellow qualifier Filip Misolic in five sets.

Ranked No. 149, he qualified for the 2024 Wimbledon Championships making also his debut, and defeated Max Purcell for his first Major win. He lost to Tommy Paul in the second round. He also qualified for the 2024 US Open making his second consecutive appearance. He recorded his first win at this Grand Slam, defeating fellow qualifier Quentin Halys.

Following lifting his sixth challenger title (out of six finals) in Brest, France, after saving three match points, Virtanen reached the top 100 in the rankings on 28 October 2024. He became just the tenth player in Challenger history to win his first six final appearances and first since Alexander Bublik in 2019.

=== 2025: Masters debut and first win ===
Virtanen recorded the biggest win of his career thus far over top-30 player and fifth seed Sebastian Korda as a qualifier at the 2025 Open 13 Provence in Marseille.

Ranked No. 130, Virtanen made his Masters 1000 debut in Rome at the 2025 Italian Open after qualifying for the main draw and defeated Hamad Medjedovic recording his first Masters win.

=== 2026: First Top 5 win ===
Virtanen recorded the biggest win of his career over world No. 5 Ben Shelton, as a qualifier, in the opening round of the 2026 Wimbledon Championships, winning in five sets. He became the first ATP Finnish player in the Open Era to defeat a top five seed at a Major. It was also his first Top 10 and Top 5 win.

== Performance timeline ==
Key
W	F	SF	QF	#R	RR	Q#	DNQ	A	NH

(W) winner; (F) finalist; (SF) semifinalist; (QF) quarterfinalist; (#R) rounds 4, 3, 2, 1; (RR) round-robin stage; (Q#) qualification round; (DNQ) did not qualify; (A) absent; (NH) not held; (SR) strike rate (events won / competed); (W–L) win–loss record.
To avoid confusion and double counting, these charts are updated at the conclusion of a tournament or when the player's participation has ended.

=== Singles ===
Tournament	2020	2021	2022	2023	2024	2025	2026	SR	W–L	Win%
Grand Slam tournaments
Australian Open	A	A	A	Q1	Q1	1R	Q1	0 / 1	0–1	0%
French Open	A	A	A	Q2	1R	Q2	Q1	0 / 1	0–1	0%
Wimbledon	NH	A	A	Q3	2R	A	2R	0 / 2	2–2	50%
US Open	A	A	A	1R	2R	Q2	1R	0 / 3	1–3	25%
Win–loss	0–0	0–0	0–0	0–1	2–3	0–1	1–2	0 / 7	3–7	30%
National representation
Davis Cup	G1		G1	SF	QR			0 / 1	8–5	62%
ATP Masters 1000
Indian Wells Masters	NH	A	A	A	A	A		0 / 0	0–0	–
Miami Open	NH	A	A	A	Q2	Q1		0 / 0	0–0	–
Monte Carlo Masters	NH	A	A	Q1	A	A		0 / 0	0–0	–
Madrid Open	NH	A	A	Q1	A	Q1		0 / 0	0-0	–
Italian Open	A	A	A	Q1	A	2R		0 / 1	1–1	50%
Canadian Open	NH	A	A	A	A	A		0 / 0	0–0	–
Cincinnati Masters	A	A	A	A	A	A		0 / 0	0–0	–
Shanghai Masters	NH			A	Q1	A		0 / 0	0–0	–
Paris Masters	A	A	A	A	A	A		0 / 0	0–0	–
Win–loss	0–0	0–0	0–0	0–0	0–0	1–1	0–0	0 / 1	1–1	50%
Career statistics
Tournaments	0	0	0	3	4	6		Career total: 13		
Overall win–loss	1–1	1–0	1–2	4–5	4–7	3–6		0 / 13	14–21	34%
Year-end ranking	610	395	175	168	94	127				

== Personal life ==
Virtanen appeared in two videos on the Finland-based YouTube channel Pongfinity, one titled "Tennis Trick Shots" in July 2019, and another titled "Return a Pro Tennis Serve, Win $1000" in June 2022.

== ATP Challenger Tour finals ==
=== Singles: 13 (9 titles, 4 runner-ups) ===
Legend ATP Challenger Tour (9–4)	Finals by surface Hard (8–1) Clay (0–1) Grass (1–2)

Result	W–L	Date	Tournament	Tier	Surface	Opponent	Score
Win	1–0	Nov 2022	Trofeo Faip–Perrel, Italy	Challenger	Hard (i)	(Germany) Jan-Lennard Struff	6–2, 7–5
Win	2–0	Mar 2023	Challenger Città di Lugano, Switzerland	Challenger	Hard (i)	(Turkey) Cem İlkel	6–4, 7–6^{(7–5)}
Win	3–0	Apr 2023	Play In Challenger, France	Challenger	Hard (i)	(Australia) Max Purcell	6–7^{(3–7)}, 6–4, 6–2
Win	4–0	Feb 2024	Open Pau–Pyrénées, France	Challenger	Hard (i)	(Switzerland) Leandro Riedi	7–5, 7–5
Win	5–0	Mar 2024	Challenger Città di Lugano, Switzerland (2)	Challenger	Hard (i)	(Germany) Daniel Masur	6–7^{(4–7)}, 6–4, 7–6^{(7–3)}
Win	6–0	Oct 2024	Brest Challenger, France	Challenger	Hard (i)	(France) Benjamin Bonzi	6–4, 4–6, 7–6^{(8–6)}
Win	7–0	Jun 2025	Birmingham Open, UK	Challenger	Grass	(United States) Colton Smith	6–4, 6–4
Win	8–0	Oct 2025	Open de Roanne, France	Challenger	Hard (i)	(France) Hugo Gaston	6–1, 3–6, 6–3
Loss	8–1	Nov 2025	HPP Open, Finland	Challenger	Hard (i)	(United States) Patrick Kypson	6–4, 3–6, 4–6
Loss	8–2	Jun 2026	Birmingham Open, UK	Challenger	Grass	(China) Bu Yunchaokete	6–2, 6–7^{(3–7)}, 3–6
Loss	8–3	Jun 2026	Nottingham Open, UK	Challenger	Grass	(Australia) Christopher O'Connell	6–7^{(3–7)}, 6–7^{(6–8)}
Loss	8–4	Jul 2026	Tampere Open, Finland	Challenger	Clay	(Germany) Diego Dedura	3–6, 7–6^{(7–3)}, 3–6
Win	9–4	Nov 2026	Orléans Open, France	Challenger	Hard (i)	(United States) Nishesh Basavareddy	6–2, 6–3

=== Doubles: 2 (1 title, 1 runner-up) ===
Legend ATP Challenger Tour (1–1)

Result	W–L	Date	Tournament	Tier	Surface	Partner	Opponents	Score
Win	1–0	Oct 2022	Brest Challenger, France	Challenger	Hard (i)	(Norway) Viktor Durasovic	(Sweden) Filip Bergevi (Greece) Petros Tsitsipas	6–4, 6–4
Loss	1–1	Oct 2023	Open de Vendée, France	Challenger	Hard (i)	(United States) Maxime Cressy	(United Kingdom) Julian Cash (United States) Robert Galloway	4–6, 7–5, [10–12]

== ITF Tour finals ==
=== Singles: 9 (3 titles, 6 runner-ups) ===
Legend ITF Futures/WTT (3–6)	Finals by surface Hard (3–3) Clay (0–3)

Result	W–L	Date	Tournament	Tier	Surface	Opponent	Score
Loss	0–1	Aug 2018	Finland F3, Helsinki	Futures	Clay	(Sweden) Karl Friberg	4–6, 1–6
Loss	0–2	Feb 2020	M25 Aktobe, Kazakhstan	WTT	Hard (i)	(Japan) Yuta Shimizu	4–6, 7–5, 3–6
Win	1–2	Nov 2020	M15 Pärnu, Estonia	WTT	Hard (i)	(Russia) Yan Sabanin	6–3, 6–0
Win	2–2	Feb 2021	M15 Nur-Sultan, Kazakhstan	WTT	Hard (i)	(Germany) Mats Rosenkranz	7–5, 6–3
Loss	2–3	May 2021	M15 Brčko, Bosnia and Herzegovina	WTT	Clay	(Ukraine) Eric Vanshelboim	3–6, 7–6^{(7–4)}, 0–6
Loss	2–4	Aug 2021	M25 Muttenz, Switzerland	WTT	Clay	(Switzerland) Jakub Paul	1–6, 5–7
Win	3–4	Sep 2021	M25 Jönköping, Sweden	WTT	Hard (i)	(Norway) Viktor Durasovic	6–4, 6–0
Loss	3–5	Jan 2022	M25 Vilnius, Lithuania	WTT	Hard (i)	(Kazakhstan) Denis Yevseyev	7–5, 3–6, 6–7^{(4–7)}
Loss	3–6	May 2022	M25 Kouvola, Finland	WTT	Hard	Ivan Nedelko	6–4, 3–6, 4–6

=== Doubles: 3 (1 title, 2 runner-ups) ===
Legend ITF Futures (1–2)

Result	W–L	Date	Tournament	Tier	Surface	Partner	Opponents	Score
Loss	0–1	May 2018	Sweden F1, Karlskrona	Futures	Clay	(Germany) Louis Wessels	(Sweden) Markus Eriksson (Sweden) Fred Simonsson	1–6, 6–1, [5–10]
Win	1–1	Aug 2018	Finland F3, Helsinki	Futures	Clay	(Finland) Patrik Niklas-Salminen	(Finland) Hermanni Tiainen (Finland) Ilari Vesanen	6–3, 6–3
Loss	1–2	Nov 2018	Finland F4, Helsinki	Futures	Hard	(Germany) Louis Wessels	(Germany) Patrick Mayer (Russia) Alexander Vasilenko	6–7^{(5–7)}, 3–6

== Junior Grand Slam finals ==
=== Doubles: 1 (title) ===
Result	Year	Tournament	Surface	Partner	Opponents	Score
Win	2018	Wimbledon	Grass	(Turkey) Yankı Erel	(Colombia) Nicolás Mejía (Czech Republic) Ondřej Štyler	7–6^{(7–5)}, 6–4

== Wins over top 10 players ==
- Virtanen has a 1–3 (25%) win-loss record against players who were, at the time the match was played, ranked in the top 10.

Season	2026	Total
Wins	1	1

#	Player	Rk	Event	Surface	Rd	Score	Rk	Ref
2026
1.	(United States) Ben Shelton	5	Wimbledon, United Kingdom	Grass	1R	6–4, 3–6, 6–7^{(8–10)}, 6–2, 7–6^{(11–9)}	140	

*As of June 30, 2026
