= 2023 Italian Open – Men's singles =

Men's singles
- 2023 Italian Open

Final
- Champion: Daniil Medvedev
- Runner-up: (Denmark) Holger Rune
- Score: 7–5, 7–5

Details
- Draw: 96 (12 Q / 5 WC )
- Seeds: 32

Events
Singles	men	women
Doubles	men	women
- Italian Open

Daniil Medvedev defeated Holger Rune in the final, 7–5, 7–5 to win the men's singles tennis title at the 2023 Italian Open. It was his fifth title of 2023, sixth career Masters 1000 title, and first ATP Tour title on clay. Before 2023, Medvedev had never won a match at the Italian Open in three previous appearances.

Novak Djokovic was the defending champion, but lost to Rune in the quarterfinals. Since Rafael Nadal withdrew before the tournament started, this marked the first time since 2004, 19 consecutive seasons, that neither Djokovic nor Nadal contested the Rome final.

By playing his second-round match, Carlos Alcaraz reclaimed the world No. 1 singles ranking from Djokovic.

== Seeds ==
All seeds receive a bye into the second round.

1. (Serbia) Novak Djokovic (quarterfinals)
2. (Spain) Carlos Alcaraz (third round)
3. Daniil Medvedev (champion)
4. (Norway) Casper Ruud (semifinals)
5. (Greece) Stefanos Tsitsipas (semifinals)
6. Andrey Rublev (fourth round)
7. (Denmark) Holger Rune (final)
8. (Italy) Jannik Sinner (fourth round)
9. (United States) Taylor Fritz (second round)
10. (Canada) Félix Auger-Aliassime (second round)
11. Karen Khachanov (second round)
12. (United States) Frances Tiafoe (third round)
13. (United Kingdom) Cameron Norrie (fourth round)
14. (Poland) Hubert Hurkacz (second round)
15. (Croatia) Borna Ćorić (quarterfinals)
16. (United States) Tommy Paul (second round)

17. (Australia) Alex de Minaur (second round)
18. (Italy) Lorenzo Musetti (fourth round)
19. (Germany) Alexander Zverev (fourth round)
20. (United Kingdom) Dan Evans (second round)
21. (Spain) Roberto Bautista Agut (second round)
22. (United States) Sebastian Korda (second round)
23. (Netherlands) Botic van de Zandschulp (second round)
24. (Argentina) Francisco Cerúndolo (quarterfinals)
25. (Japan) Yoshihito Nishioka (second round)
26. (Bulgaria) Grigor Dimitrov (third round)
27. (Spain) Alejandro Davidovich Fokina (third round)
28. (United States) Ben Shelton (second round)
29. (Netherlands) Tallon Griekspoor (withdrew)
30. (Serbia) Miomir Kecmanović (second round)
31. (Spain) Bernabé Zapata Miralles (third round)
32. (Czech Republic) Jiří Lehečka (second round)

Click on the seed number of a player to go to their draw section.

== Draw ==
Key

- Q = Qualifier
- WC = Wild card
- LL = Lucky loser
- Alt = Alternate
- ITF = ITF entry
- PR = Protected ranking
- SR = Special ranking
- SE = Special exempt
- JE = Junior exempt
- JR = Junior Accelerator Programme entrant
- CO = College Accelerator Programme entrant
- NG = Next Gen Accelerator Program entrant
- w/o = Walkover
- r = Retired
- d = Defaulted

=== Finals ===
Quarterfinals
1	(Serbia) Novak Djokovic	2	6	2
7	(Denmark) Holger Rune	6	4	6
4	(Norway) Casper Ruud	7^{7}	6
24	(Argentina) Francisco Cerúndolo	6^{5}	4
Q	(Germany) Yannick Hanfmann	2	2
3	Daniil Medvedev	6	6
5	(Greece) Stefanos Tsitsipas	6	6
15	(Croatia) Borna Ćorić	3	4

Semifinals
7	(Denmark) Holger Rune	6^{2}	6	6
4	(Norway) Casper Ruud	7^{7}	4	2
3	Daniil Medvedev	7	7
5	(Greece) Stefanos Tsitsipas	5	5

Final
7	(Denmark) Holger Rune	5	5
3	Daniil Medvedev	7	7

=== Top half ===
==== Section 1 ====
First round
(France) L Van Assche	6^{7}	3
(Argentina) TM Etcheverry	7^{9}	6
I Ivashka	2	4
(Switzerland) S Wawrinka	6	6
(Serbia) F Krajinović	4	2
(Hungary) M Fucsovics	6	6
PR	(United Kingdom) K Edmund	1	3
Q	(France) A Müller	6	6

Second round
1	(Serbia) N Djokovic	7^{7}	6
(Argentina) TM Etcheverry	6^{5}	2
(Switzerland) S Wawrinka	4	6^{3}
26	(Bulgaria) G Dimitrov	6	7^{7}
17	(Australia) A de Minaur	3	4
(Hungary) M Fucsovics	6	6
Q	(France) A Müller	2	3
13	(United Kingdom) C Norrie	6	6

Third round
1	(Serbia) N Djokovic	6	4	6
26	(Bulgaria) G Dimitrov	3	6	1
(Hungary) M Fucsovics	2	6^{4}
13	(United Kingdom) C Norrie	6	7^{7}

Fourth round
1	(Serbia) N Djokovic	6	6
13	(United Kingdom) C Norrie	3	4

==== Section 2 ====
First round
Q	(Australia) A Popyrin	6	7^{7}
(Australia) C O'Connell	2	6^{5}
Q	R Safiullin	6	6
(United States) M Giron	4	3
WC	(Italy) F Fognini	6	4	6
(United Kingdom) A Murray	4	6	4
Q	(Argentina) JM Cerúndolo	1	6	4
Q	(France) A Fils	6	1	6

Second round
10	(Canada) F Auger-Aliassime	4	6	5
Q	(Australia) A Popyrin	6	4	7
Q	R Safiullin	6	7^{7}
22	(United States) S Korda	2	6^{5}
30	(Serbia) M Kecmanović	3	6^{6}
WC	(Italy) F Fognini	6	7^{8}
Q	(France) A Fils	3	3
7	(Denmark) H Rune	6	6

Third round
Q	(Australia) A Popyrin	7	7
Q	R Safiullin	5	5
WC	(Italy) F Fognini	4	2
7	(Denmark) H Rune	6	6

Fourth round
Q	(Australia) A Popyrin	4	7	4
7	(Denmark) H Rune	6	5	6

==== Section 3 ====
First round
Q	(Italy) F Cobolli	4	3
(France) A Rinderknech	6	6
Q	(Spain) P Martínez	3	6^{4}
(Kazakhstan) A Bublik	6	7^{7}
(France) C Lestienne	1	0^{r}
(Serbia) L Djere	6	0
(Argentina) P Cachin	4	6	6^{5}
(Chile) C Garín	6	3	7^{7}

Second round
4	(Norway) C Ruud	6	6
(France) A Rinderknech	4	0
(Kazakhstan) A Bublik	6	1	6
28	(United States) B Shelton	4	6	2
23	(Netherlands) B van de Zandschulp	2	4
(Serbia) L Djere	6	6
(Chile) C Garín	4	6	6
16	(United States) T Paul	6	3	4

Third round
4	(Norway) C Ruud	6	4	7^{7}
(Kazakhstan) A Bublik	1	6	6^{0}
(Serbia) L Djere	6	2
(Chile) C Garín	3	1^{r}

Fourth round
4	(Norway) C Ruud	6	6
(Serbia) L Djere	1	3

==== Section 4 ====
First round
(United States) B Nakashima	3	3
(France) G Barrère	6	6
(France) R Gasquet	6	3	3
(China) Y Wu	3	6	6
(Argentina) S Báez	7	6
(Peru) JP Varillas	5	3
(Spain) J Munar	2^{r}
Q	(Australia) T Kokkinakis	4

Second round
11	K Khachanov	6	4	6^{4}
(France) G Barrère	4	6	7^{7}
(China) Y Wu	6	2	3
24	(Argentina) F Cerúndolo	4	6	6
LL	A Shevchenko	6	6
(Argentina) S Báez	3	4
Q	(Australia) T Kokkinakis	1	4
8	(Italy) J Sinner	6	6

Third round
(France) G Barrère	7^{7}	2	2
24	(Argentina) F Cerúndolo	6^{0}	6	6
LL	A Shevchenko	3	7^{7}	2
8	(Italy) J Sinner	6	6^{4}	6

Fourth round
24	(Argentina) F Cerúndolo	6^{3}	6	6
8	(Italy) J Sinner	7^{7}	2	2

=== Bottom half ===
==== Section 5 ====
First round
Q	(Italy) S Napolitano	4	6	6^{1}
(Slovakia) A Molčan	6	3	7^{7}
PR	(Argentina) G Pella	6	6
(United States) M Cressy	3	4
(Italy) M Cecchinato	6	7
(United States) M McDonald	3	5
(Chile) N Jarry	4	4
Q	(Germany) Y Hanfmann	6	6

Second round
6	A Rublev	6	6
(Slovakia) A Molčan	3	4
PR	(Argentina) G Pella	0	6^{4}
27	(Spain) A Davidovich Fokina	6	7^{7}
21	(Spain) R Bautista Agut	2	2
(Italy) M Cecchinato	6	6
Q	(Germany) Y Hanfmann	6	6
9	(United States) T Fritz	4	1

Third round
6	A Rublev	7^{10}	6
27	(Spain) A Davidovich Fokina	6^{8}	3
(Italy) M Cecchinato	4	6	3
Q	(Germany) Y Hanfmann	6	4	6

Fourth round
6	A Rublev	6^{5}	6	3
Q	(Germany) Y Hanfmann	7^{7}	4	6

==== Section 6 ====
First round
LL	(France) H Grenier	5	5
(United States) JJ Wolf	7	7
WC	(Italy) L Nardi	6	4	2
(Belgium) D Goffin	3	6	6
(Switzerland) M-A Hüsler	7^{8}	4	2
(Australia) J Kubler	6^{6}	6	6
(France) U Humbert	4	6	6^{6}
(Finland) E Ruusuvuori	6	3	7^{8}

Second round
14	(Poland) H Hurkacz	3	4
(United States) JJ Wolf	6	6
(Belgium) D Goffin	7	3	4
19	(Germany) A Zverev	5	6	6
31	(Spain) B Zapata Miralles	6	6
(Australia) J Kubler	4	1
(Finland) E Ruusuvuori	4	2
3	D Medvedev	6	6

Third round
(United States) JJ Wolf	4	5
19	(Germany) A Zverev	6	7
31	(Spain) B Zapata Miralles	6	1	3
3	D Medvedev	3	6	6

Fourth round
19	(Germany) A Zverev	2	6^{3}
3	D Medvedev	6	7^{7}

==== Section 7 ====
First round
(Serbia) D Lajović	4	1
(Portugal) N Borges	6	6
(Italy) L Sonego	6	6
PR	(France) J Chardy	2	1
WC	(Italy) M Arnaldi	6	4	6
(Argentina) D Schwartzman	1	6	3
WC	(Italy) G Zeppieri	6^{3}	6	0
Q	(Germany) D Altmaier	7^{7}	4	6

Second round
5	(Greece) S Tsitsipas	6	6
(Portugal) N Borges	3	3
(Italy) L Sonego	7	6
25	(Japan) Y Nishioka	5	3
18	(Italy) L Musetti	6	6
WC	(Italy) M Arnaldi	4	4
Q	(Germany) D Altmaier	6	5	3
12	(United States) F Tiafoe	3	7	6

Third round
5	(Greece) S Tsitsipas	6	7^{7}
(Italy) L Sonego	3	6^{3}
18	(Italy) L Musetti	5	6	6
12	(United States) F Tiafoe	7	4	3

Fourth round
5	(Greece) S Tsitsipas	7	7
18	(Italy) L Musetti	5	5

==== Section 8 ====
First round
(France) A Mannarino	1	2
(Brazil) T Monteiro	6	6
PR	(Bolivia) H Dellien	2	3
(Spain) R Carballés Baena	6	6
(France) C Moutet	0	7^{10}	2
Q	(Hungary) F Marozsán	6	6^{8}	6
(Spain) A Ramos Viñolas	4	6	6
WC	(Italy) F Passaro	6	1	4

Second round
15	(Croatia) B Ćorić	4	7^{10}	7^{7}
(Brazil) T Monteiro	6	6^{8}	6^{5}
(Spain) R Carballés Baena	7^{7}	5	6
20	(United Kingdom) D Evans	6^{5}	7	4
32	(Czech Republic) J Lehečka	6	1	6^{4}
Q	(Hungary) F Marozsán	4	6	7^{7}
(Spain) A Ramos Viñolas	4	1
2	(Spain) C Alcaraz	6	6

Third round
15	(Croatia) B Ćorić	7^{7}	6
(Spain) R Carballés Baena	6^{3}	1
Q	(Hungary) F Marozsán	6	7^{7}
2	(Spain) C Alcaraz	3	6^{4}

Fourth round
15	(Croatia) B Ćorić	3	6	6
Q	(Hungary) F Marozsán	6	4	3

== Seeded players ==
The following are the seeded players. Seedings are based on ATP rankings as of 8 May 2023. Rankings and points before are as of 8 May 2023.

Because the men's tournament is being expanded to two weeks this year, players are defending points from the 2022 Italian Open, as well as tournaments that took place during the week of 16 May 2022 (Geneva and Lyon). Points from the 2022 Italian Open are listed first in the "Points defending" column.

Seed	Rank	Player	Points before	Points defending	Points earned	Points after	Status
1	1	(Serbia) Novak Djokovic	6,775	1,000	180	5,955	Quarterfinals lost to (Denmark) Holger Rune [7]
2	2	(Spain) Carlos Alcaraz	6,770	0	45	6,815	Third round lost to (Hungary) Fábián Marozsán [Q]
3	3	Daniil Medvedev	5,330	0	1,000	6,330	Champion, defeated (Denmark) Holger Rune [7]
4	4	(Norway) Casper Ruud	5,165	360+250	360+0	4,915	Semifinals lost to (Denmark) Holger Rune [7]
5	5	(Greece) Stefanos Tsitsipas	5,015	600	360	4,775	Semifinals lost to Daniil Medvedev [3]
6	6	Andrey Rublev	4,190	10	90	4,270	Fourth round lost to (Germany) Yannick Hanfmann [Q]
7	7	(Denmark) Holger Rune	3,865	90^{†}	600	4,375	Runner-up, lost to Daniil Medvedev [3]
8	8	(Italy) Jannik Sinner	3,525	180	90	3,435	Fourth round lost to (Argentina) Francisco Cerúndolo [24]
9	9	(United States) Taylor Fritz	3,380	0	10	3,390	Second round lost to (Germany) Yannick Hanfmann [Q]
10	10	(Canada) Félix Auger-Aliassime	3,235	180	10	3,065	Second round lost to (Australia) Alexei Popyrin [Q]
11	11	Karen Khachanov	3,025	90	10	2,945	Second round lost to (France) Grégoire Barrère
12	12	(United States) Frances Tiafoe	2,755	10	45	2,790	Third round lost to (Italy) Lorenzo Musetti [18]
13	13	(United Kingdom) Cameron Norrie	2,680	45+250	90+45	2,520	Fourth round lost to (Serbia) Novak Djokovic [1]
14	15	(Poland) Hubert Hurkacz	2,525	10	10	2,525	Second round lost to (United States) J. J. Wolf
15	16	(Croatia) Borna Ćorić	2,240	10	180	2,410	Quarterfinals lost to (Greece) Stefanos Tsitsipas [5]
16	17	(United States) Tommy Paul	2,170	45	10	2,135	Second round lost to (Chile) Cristian Garín
17	18	(Australia) Alex de Minaur	1,995	90+90	10+45	1,870	Second round lost to (Hungary) Márton Fucsovics
18	19	(Italy) Lorenzo Musetti	1,960	(10)^{‡}	90	2,040	Fourth round lost to (Greece) Stefanos Tsitsipas [5]
19	22	(Germany) Alexander Zverev	1,630	360	90	1,360	Fourth round lost to Daniil Medvedev [3]
20	24	(United Kingdom) Dan Evans	1,480	10	10	1,480	Second round lost to (Spain) Roberto Carballés Baena
21	25	(Spain) Roberto Bautista Agut	1,475	0	10	1,485	Second round lost to (Italy) Marco Cecchinato
22	29	(United States) Sebastian Korda	1,265	10	10	1,265	Second round lost to Roman Safiullin [Q]
23	30	(Netherlands) Botic van de Zandschulp	1,250	45	10	1,215	Second round lost to (Serbia) Laslo Djere
24	31	(Argentina) Francisco Cerúndolo	1,200	35	180	1,345	Quarterfinals lost to (Norway) Casper Ruud [4]
25	32	(Japan) Yoshihito Nishioka	1,171	0	10	1,181	Second round lost to (Italy) Lorenzo Sonego
26	33	(Bulgaria) Grigor Dimitrov	1,125	45	45	1,125	Third round lost to (Serbia) Novak Djokovic [1]
27	34	(Spain) Alejandro Davidovich Fokina	1,115	45	45	1,115	Third round lost to Andrey Rublev [6]
28	35	(United States) Ben Shelton	1,095	(10)^{‡}	10	1,095	Second round lost to (Kazakhstan) Alexander Bublik
29	36	~~(Netherlands) Tallon Griekspoor~~	1,091	35+45	0+13	1,024	Withdrew due to a right ankle to injury
30	37	(Serbia) Miomir Kecmanović	1,055	10	10	1,055	Second round lost to (Italy) Fabio Fognini [WC]
31	38	(Spain) Bernabé Zapata Miralles	1,016	20^{§}	45	1,041	Third round lost to Daniil Medvedev [3]
32	39	(Czech Republic) Jiří Lehečka	992	(8)^{‡}	10	994	Second round lost to (Hungary) Fábián Marozsán [Q]

† The player did not qualify for the main draw in 2022, but is defending points from Lyon.
‡ The player did not qualify for the main draw in 2022. Points for his 19th best result will be deducted instead.
§ The player did not qualify for the main draw in 2022, but is defending points from an ATP Challenger Tour event (Heilbronn).

=== Withdrawn players ===
The following players would have been seeded, but withdrew before the tournament began.

Rank	Player	Points before	Points dropped	Points after	Withdrawal reason
14	(Spain) Rafael Nadal	2,535	90	2,445	Hip injury
20	(Italy) Matteo Berrettini	1,832	0	1,832	Abdominal injury
21	(Spain) Pablo Carreño Busta	1,785	45	1,740	Elbow injury
23	(Croatia) Marin Čilić	1,600	90	1,510	Knee injury
26	(Australia) Nick Kyrgios	1,465	0	1,465	Left knee injury
27	(Canada) Denis Shapovalov	1,390	180	1,210	Knee injury

== Other entry information ==
=== Wildcards ===
- (Italy) Matteo Arnaldi
- (Italy) Fabio Fognini
- (Italy) Luca Nardi
- (Italy) Francesco Passaro
- (Italy) Giulio Zeppieri

=== Protected ranking ===
- (France) Jérémy Chardy
- (Bolivia) Hugo Dellien
- (United Kingdom) Kyle Edmund
- (Argentina) Guido Pella

=== Withdrawals ===
- (Italy) Matteo Berrettini → replaced by (Australia) Christopher O'Connell
- (France) Benjamin Bonzi → replaced by (Serbia) Filip Krajinović
- (United States) Jenson Brooksby → replaced by (Italy) Marco Cecchinato
- (Spain) Pablo Carreño Busta → replaced by (Switzerland) Stan Wawrinka
- (Croatia) Marin Čilić → replaced by (France) Ugo Humbert
- (Argentina) Federico Coria → replaced by (Belgium) David Goffin
- (United Kingdom) Jack Draper → replaced by (Spain) Jaume Munar
- (Netherlands) Tallon Griekspoor → replaced by Alexander Shevchenko
- (France) Quentin Halys → replaced by (France) Hugo Grenier
- (United States) John Isner → replaced by (Chile) Cristian Garín
- (Australia) Nick Kyrgios → replaced by (Brazil) Thiago Monteiro
- (Spain) Rafael Nadal → replaced by (France) Luca Van Assche
- (Canada) Denis Shapovalov → replaced by (France) Jérémy Chardy
- (Sweden) Mikael Ymer → replaced by (Peru) Juan Pablo Varillas

== Qualifying ==
=== Seeds ===
1. (Australia) Alexei Popyrin (qualified)
2. (Germany) Daniel Altmaier (qualified)
3. (France) Alexandre Müller (qualified)
4. Alexander Shevchenko (qualifying competition, lucky loser)
5. (China) Zhang Zhizhen (first round)
6. (Colombia) Daniel Elahi Galán (first round)
7. (Argentina) Juan Manuel Cerúndolo (qualified)
8. (United States) Aleksandar Kovacevic (first round)
9. (Germany) Yannick Hanfmann (qualified)
10. (Japan) Taro Daniel (first round)
11. (Croatia) Borna Gojo (first round)
12. (Australia) Thanasi Kokkinakis (qualified)
13. Roman Safiullin (qualified)
14. (Finland) Otto Virtanen (first round)
15. (Austria) Jurij Rodionov (first round)
16. (Czech Republic) Tomáš Macháč (first round)
17. (France) Arthur Fils (qualified)
18. (France) Hugo Grenier (qualifying competition, lucky loser)
19. (Argentina) Camilo Ugo Carabelli (first round)
20. (Chile) Tomás Barrios Vera (qualifying competition)
21. (Hungary) Fábián Marozsán (qualified)
22. (Georgia (country)) Nikoloz Basilashvili (first round, retired)
23. (Spain) Pedro Martínez (qualified)
24. (Italy) Raúl Brancaccio (first round)

=== Qualifiers ===
1. (Australia) Alexei Popyrin
2. (Germany) Daniel Altmaier
3. (France) Alexandre Müller
4. (France) Arthur Fils
5. (Spain) Pedro Martínez
6. Roman Safiullin
7. (Argentina) Juan Manuel Cerúndolo
8. (Italy) Stefano Napolitano
9. (Germany) Yannick Hanfmann
10. (Italy) Flavio Cobolli
11. (Hungary) Fábián Marozsán
12. (Australia) Thanasi Kokkinakis

=== Lucky losers ===
1. Alexander Shevchenko
2. (France) Hugo Grenier

=== Qualifying draw ===
==== First qualifier ====
First round
1	(Australia) Alexei Popyrin	6	4	6
(Italy) Riccardo Bonadio	4	6	3
(Italy) Andrea Pellegrino	6	0	6
24	(Italy) Raúl Brancaccio	3	6	3

Qualifying competition
1	(Australia) Alexei Popyrin	6	7^{7}
(Italy) Andrea Pellegrino	0	6^{3}

==== Second qualifier ====
First round
2	(Germany) Daniel Altmaier	6	6
(Slovakia) Jozef Kovalík	2	4
(Sweden) Elias Ymer	1	6	7^{7}
16	(Czech Republic) Tomáš Macháč	6	2	6^{4}

Qualifying competition
2	(Germany) Daniel Altmaier	7^{7}	6
(Sweden) Elias Ymer	6^{5}	0

==== Third qualifier ====
First round
3	(France) Alexandre Müller	2	7^{7}	6
WC	(Italy) Gianmarco Ferrari	6	6^{4}	4
(Italy) Franco Agamenone	4	6	6
14	(Finland) Otto Virtanen	6	1	2

Qualifying competition
3	(France) Alexandre Müller	6	6
(Italy) Franco Agamenone	0	1

==== Fourth qualifier ====
First round
4	Alexander Shevchenko	6	6
(Ukraine) Oleksii Krutykh	4	2
(United Kingdom) Ryan Peniston	2	6	6^{4}
17	(France) Arthur Fils	6	4	7^{7}

Qualifying competition
4	Alexander Shevchenko	3	4
17	(France) Arthur Fils	6	6

==== Fifth qualifier ====
First round
5	(China) Zhang Zhizhen	5	6	5
(Italy) Francesco Maestrelli	7	2	7
(Italy) Andrea Vavassori	2	7	2
23	(Spain) Pedro Martínez	6	5	6

Qualifying competition
(Italy) Francesco Maestrelli	0	2
23	(Spain) Pedro Martínez	6	6

==== Sixth qualifier ====
First round
6	(Colombia) Daniel Elahi Galán	6^{2}	6	6^{1}
(Czech Republic) Vít Kopřiva	7^{7}	3	7^{7}
(Portugal) João Sousa	1	3
13	Roman Safiullin	6	6

Qualifying competition
(Czech Republic) Vít Kopřiva	2	6^{3}
13	Roman Safiullin	6	7^{7}

==== Seventh qualifier ====
First round
7	(Argentina) Juan Manuel Cerúndolo	6	6
(Netherlands) Jelle Sels	2	2
(Italy) Mattia Bellucci	6^{4}	0
20	(Chile) Tomás Barrios Vera	7^{7}	6

Qualifying competition
7	(Argentina) Juan Manuel Cerúndolo	6	6
20	(Chile) Tomás Barrios Vera	3	1

==== Eighth qualifier ====
First round
8	(United States) Aleksandar Kovacevic	4	3
WC	(Italy) Stefano Napolitano	6	6
(Germany) Maximilian Marterer	6	7^{8}
19	(Argentina) Camilo Ugo Carabelli	3	6^{6}

Qualifying competition
WC	(Italy) Stefano Napolitano	4	7	7
(Germany) Maximilian Marterer	6	5	5

==== Ninth qualifier ====
First round
9	(Germany) Yannick Hanfmann	6	7^{7}
WC	(Italy) Julian Ocleppo	4	6^{3}
(Argentina) Andrea Collarini	3	7	2
18	(France) Hugo Grenier	6	5	6

Qualifying competition
9	(Germany) Yannick Hanfmann	6	6
18	(France) Hugo Grenier	4	4

==== Tenth qualifier ====
First round
10	(Japan) Taro Daniel	6	2	4
(United States) Emilio Nava	0	6	6
WC	(Italy) Flavio Cobolli	5
22	(Georgia (country)) Nikoloz Basilashvili	2^{r}

Qualifying competition
(United States) Emilio Nava	6	6^{4}	5
WC	(Italy) Flavio Cobolli	4	7^{7}	7

==== Eleventh qualifier ====
First round
11	(Croatia) Borna Gojo	6^{5}	3
(Brazil) Felipe Meligeni Alves	7^{7}	6
(Kazakhstan) Timofey Skatov	0	6	5
21	(Hungary) Fábián Marozsán	6	2	7

Qualifying competition
(Brazil) Felipe Meligeni Alves	5	1
21	(Hungary) Fábián Marozsán	7	6

==== Twelfth qualifier ====
First round
12	(Australia) Thanasi Kokkinakis	7	6
WC	(Italy) Matteo Gigante	5	3
(United Kingdom) Jan Choinski	2	6	6
15	(Austria) Jurij Rodionov	6	1	2

Qualifying competition
12	(Australia) Thanasi Kokkinakis	6	6
(United Kingdom) Jan Choinski	2	2
