= 2023 Antalya Challenger – Doubles =

Doubles
- 2023 Antalya Challenger

Final
- Champions: (Sweden) Filip Bergevi (Greece) Petros Tsitsipas
- Runners-up: (Turkey) Sarp Ağabigün (Turkey) Ergi Kırkın
- Score: 6–2, 6–4

Events
Singles	Doubles
- Antalya Challenger

Hsu Yu-hsiou and Oleksii Krutykh were the defending champions but chose not to defend their title.

Filip Bergevi and Petros Tsitsipas won the title after defeating Sarp Ağabigün and Ergi Kırkın 6–2, 6–4 in the final.

== Seeds ==
1. (Czech Republic) Roman Jebavý / (Czech Republic) Adam Pavlásek (semifinals)
2. (Serbia) Ivan Sabanov / (Serbia) Matej Sabanov (first round)
3. (France) Théo Arribagé / Ivan Liutarevich (quarterfinals)
4. (Czech Republic) Zdeněk Kolář / (Germany) Kai Wehnelt (semifinals)

== Draw ==
Key

- Q = Qualifier
- WC = Wild card
- LL = Lucky loser
- Alt = Alternate
- ITF = ITF entry
- PR = Protected ranking
- SR = Special ranking
- SE = Special exempt
- JE = Junior exempt
- JR = Junior Accelerator Programme entrant
- CO = College Accelerator Programme entrant
- NG = Next Gen Accelerator Program entrant
- w/o = Walkover
- r = Retired
- d = Defaulted

First round
1	(Czech Republic) R Jebavý (Czech Republic) A Pavlásek	7^{7}	6^{2}	[10]
Alt	(Belgium) K Coppejans (Canada) S Diez	6^{4}	7^{7}	[7]
(Bosnia and Herzegovina) D Džumhur (Bosnia and Herzegovina) N Fatić
(Czech Republic) V Kopřiva (Poland) P Matuszewski	w/o
3	(France) T Arribagé; I Liutarevich	6	7
(Italy) S Caruso (Italy) F Cobolli	2	5
WC	(Romania) A Jecan (Poland) D Michalski	2	6	[4]
WC	(Turkey) S Ağabigün (Turkey) E Kırkın	6	3	[10]
PR	(Uzbekistan) S Fayziev (Greece) M Kalovelonis	7^{7}	6^{2}	[7]
(Italy) A Giannessi (Italy) G Mager	6^{2}	7^{7}	[10]
(Hungary) F Marozsán (Hungary) M Valkusz	6	2	[3]
4	(Czech Republic) Z Kolář (Germany) K Wehnelt	4	6	[10]
(Romania) ND Ionel (Australia) L Tu	4	2
(Sweden) F Bergevi (Greece) Pe Tsitsipas	6	6
(Belgium) M Geerts (Italy) S Travaglia	7^{7}	6
2	(Serbia) I Sabanov (Serbia) M Sabanov	6^{2}	2

Quarterfinals
1	(Czech Republic) R Jebavý (Czech Republic) A Pavlásek	6	4	[10]
(Czech Republic) V Kopřiva (Poland) P Matuszewski	2	6	[2]
3	(France) T Arribagé; I Liutarevich	1	7^{7}	[4]
WC	(Turkey) S Ağabigün (Turkey) E Kırkın	6	6^{1}	[10]
(Italy) A Giannessi (Italy) G Mager	5	3
4	(Czech Republic) Z Kolář (Germany) K Wehnelt	7	6
(Sweden) F Bergevi (Greece) Pe Tsitsipas	7	6
(Belgium) M Geerts (Italy) S Travaglia	5	3

Semifinals
1	(Czech Republic) R Jebavý (Czech Republic) A Pavlásek	5	2
WC	(Turkey) S Ağabigün (Turkey) E Kırkın	7	6
4	(Czech Republic) Z Kolář (Germany) K Wehnelt	2	3
(Sweden) F Bergevi (Greece) Pe Tsitsipas	6	6

Final
WC	(Turkey) S Ağabigün (Turkey) E Kırkın	2	4
(Sweden) F Bergevi (Greece) Pe Tsitsipas	6	6
