= 2021 ATP Lyon Open =

Tennis competition

- Date: 15–22 May
- Edition: 4th
- Category: ATP Tour 250
- Draw: 28S / 16D
- Prize money: €419,470
- Surface: Clay / outdoor
- Location: Lyon, France
- Venue: Vélodrome Georges Préveral

Champions

Singles
- (Greece) Stefanos Tsitsipas

Doubles
- (Monaco) Hugo Nys / (Germany) Tim Pütz
← 2019 ·	ATP Lyon Open	· 2022 →

The 2021 ATP Lyon Open (also known as the Open Parc Auvergne-Rhône-Alpes Lyon) was a men's tennis tournament played on outdoor clay courts. It was the fourth edition of the Lyon Open and part of the ATP Tour 250 series of the 2021 ATP Tour. It took place in the city of Lyon, France, from 15 May through 22 May 2021. Second-seeded Stefanos Tsitsipas won the singles title.

== Finals ==
=== Singles ===
- (Greece) Stefanos Tsitsipas defeated (United Kingdom) Cameron Norrie, 6–3, 6–3

=== Doubles ===
- (Monaco) Hugo Nys / (Germany) Tim Pütz defeated (France) Pierre-Hugues Herbert / (France) Nicolas Mahut, 6–4, 5–7, [10–8]

== Points and prize money ==
=== Point distribution ===
Event	W	F	SF	QF	Round of 16	Round of 32	Q	Q2	Q1
Singles	250	150	90	45	20	0	12	6	0
Doubles	250	150	90	45	0	—	—	—	—

=== Prize money ===
Event	W	F	SF	QF	Round of 16	Round of 32	Q2	Q1
Singles	€41,145	€29,500	€21,000	€14,000	€9,000	€5,415	€2,645	€1,375
Doubles*	€15,360	€11,000	€7,250	€4,710	€2,760	—	—	—

_{*per team}

== Singles main draw entrants ==
=== Seeds ===
Country	Player	Rank^{1}	Seed
AUT	Dominic Thiem	4	1
GRE	Stefanos Tsitsipas	5	2
ARG	Diego Schwartzman	10	3
BEL	David Goffin	13	4
FRA	Gaël Monfils	15	5
ITA	Jannik Sinner	18	6
CAN	Félix Auger-Aliassime	21	7
RUS	Karen Khachanov	24	8

- Rankings are as of May 10, 2021.

=== Other entrants ===
The following players received wildcards into the singles main draw:

- (France) Benjamin Bonzi
- (Austria) Dominic Thiem
- (Greece) Stefanos Tsitsipas

The following player received entry as an alternate:

- (Italy) Lorenzo Musetti

The following players received entry from the qualifying draw:

- (France) Grégoire Barrère
- (Poland) Kamil Majchrzak
- (Portugal) João Sousa
- (Sweden) Mikael Ymer

The following players received entry as lucky losers:

- (France) Arthur Rinderknech
- (Brazil) Thiago Seyboth Wild

=== Withdrawals ===
Before the tournament

- (Italy) Matteo Berrettini → replaced by (France) Corentin Moutet
- (France) Jérémy Chardy → replaced by (Japan) Yoshihito Nishioka
- (United Kingdom) Dan Evans → replaced by (France) Pierre-Hugues Herbert
- (United States) Taylor Fritz → replaced by (United Kingdom) Cameron Norrie
- (South Africa) Lloyd Harris → replaced by (Brazil) Thiago Seyboth Wild
- (Australia) John Millman → replaced by (France) Gilles Simon
- (Spain) Albert Ramos Viñolas → replaced by (France) Arthur Rinderknech
- (Italy) Lorenzo Sonego → replaced by (Italy) Lorenzo Musetti

== Doubles main draw entrants ==
=== Seeds ===
Country	Player	Country	Player	Rank^{1}	Seed
FRA	Pierre-Hugues Herbert	FRA	Nicolas Mahut	27	1
FIN	Henri Kontinen	FRA	Édouard Roger-Vasselin	46	2
GBR	Ken Skupski	GBR	Neal Skupski	77	3
MON	Hugo Nys	GER	Tim Pütz	106	4

- Rankings are as of May 10, 2021.

=== Other entrants ===
The following pairs received wildcards into the doubles main draw:

- (France) Grégoire Barrère / (France) Albano Olivetti
- (Greece) Petros Tsitsipas / (Greece) Stefanos Tsitsipas

The following pair enters with a protected ranking into the doubles main draw:

- (Spain) Marc López / (France) Fabrice Martin

=== Withdrawals ===
Before the tournament

- (France) Jérémy Chardy / (France) Fabrice Martin → replaced by (Spain) Marc López / (France) Fabrice Martin
- (New Zealand) Marcus Daniell / (Austria) Philipp Oswald → replaced by (Sweden) André Göransson / (Belarus) Andrei Vasilevski
- (Israel) Jonathan Erlich / (South Africa) Lloyd Harris → replaced by (New Zealand) Artem Sitak / (Portugal) João Sousa
- (Australia) John Millman / (India) Divij Sharan → replaced by (Netherlands) Sander Arends / (India) Divij Sharan
- (Pakistan) Aisam-ul-Haq Qureshi / (Italy) Andrea Vavassori → replaced by (Kazakhstan) Aleksandr Nedovyesov / (Italy) Andrea Vavassori
