= 2026 Crete Challenger III – Doubles =

Doubles
- 2026 Crete Challenger III

Final
- Champions: (Greece) Pavlos Tsitsipas (Greece) Petros Tsitsipas
- Runners-up: (Bulgaria) Alex Ganchev (Luxembourg) Sacha Maes
- Score: 7–5, 7–6^{(7–4)}

Events
Singles	Doubles
- Crete Challenger

Michael Geerts and Tiago Pereira were the defending champions but only Geerts chose to defend his title, partnering Rémy Bertola. They lost in the quarterfinals to Lorenzo Angelini and Carlo Alberto Caniato.

Pavlos and Petros Tsitsipas won the title after defeating Alex Ganchev and Sacha Maes 7–5, 7–6^{(7–4)} in the final.

== Seeds ==
1. (Romania) Victor Vlad Cornea / (Germany) Kai Wehnelt (quarterfinals)
2. (United Kingdom) James Hopper / (United Kingdom) Mark Whitehouse (first round)
3. (Switzerland) Rémy Bertola / (Belgium) Michael Geerts (quarterfinals)
4. (Italy) Lorenzo Carboni / (Ukraine) Volodymyr Uzhylovskyi (first round)

== Draw ==
Key

- Q = Qualifier
- WC = Wild card
- LL = Lucky loser
- Alt = Alternate
- ITF = ITF entry
- PR = Protected ranking
- SR = Special ranking
- SE = Special exempt
- JE = Junior exempt
- JR = Junior Accelerator Programme entrant
- CO = College Accelerator Programme entrant
- NG = Next Gen Accelerator Program entrant
- w/o = Walkover
- r = Retired
- d = Defaulted

First round
1	(Romania) V Cornea (Germany) K Wehnelt	6	6
WC	(Italy) Umberto Giuseppe Capitanio (United States) Tyler Haddorff	1	3
(Bulgaria) Alex Ganchev (Luxembourg) Sacha Maes	w/o
(Bulgaria) A Andreev (Ukraine) V Orlov
3	(Switzerland) R Bertola (Belgium) M Geerts	6	6^{4}	[10]
WC	(Greece) Theofanis Kontopoulos (Greece) Georgios Mitalas	3	7^{7}	[8]
(Italy) Lorenzo Angelini (Italy) CA Caniato	6	6
(France) R Bertrand (France) Leo Raquillet	2	3
(Greece) Pa Tsitsipas (Greece) Pe Tsitsipas	6	6
(Ukraine) G Kravchenko (Ukraine) N Mashtakov	3	4
(Uzbekistan) S Fomin (Ukraine) O Krutykh	7^{7}	7
4	(Italy) Lorenzo Carboni (Ukraine) V Uzhylovskyi	6^{2}	5
(Italy) M Ribecai (Italy) Gabriele Volpi	6	4	[9]
(South Africa) Vasilios Caripi (France) Benjamin Pietri	1	6	[11]
(Cyprus) M Efstathiou (Cyprus) E Neos	6	3	[10]
2	(United Kingdom) James Hopper (United Kingdom) M Whitehouse	4	6	[7]

Quarterfinals
1	(Romania) V Cornea (Germany) K Wehnelt	4	2
(Bulgaria) A Ganchev (Luxembourg) S Maes	6	6
3	(Switzerland) R Bertola (Belgium) M Geerts	3	3
(Italy) L Angelini (Italy) CA Caniato	6	6
(Greece) Pa Tsitsipas (Greece) Pe Tsitsipas	6	3	[14]
(Uzbekistan) S Fomin (Ukraine) O Krutykh	1	6	[12]
(South Africa) V Caripi (France) B Pietri	6	3	[13]
(Cyprus) M Efstathiou (Cyprus) E Neos	3	6	[11]

Semifinals
(Bulgaria) A Ganchev (Luxembourg) S Maes	6	6
(Italy) L Angelini (Italy) CA Caniato	2	3
(Greece) Pa Tsitsipas (Greece) Pe Tsitsipas	6^{6}	6	[10]
(South Africa) V Caripi (France) B Pietri	7^{8}	3	[7]

Final
(Bulgaria) A Ganchev (Luxembourg) S Maes	5	6^{4}
(Greece) Pa Tsitsipas (Greece) Pe Tsitsipas	7	7^{7}
