= 2021 ATP Lyon Open – Doubles =

Doubles
- 2021 ATP Lyon Open

Final
- Champions: (Monaco) Hugo Nys (Germany) Tim Pütz
- Runners-up: (France) Pierre-Hugues Herbert (France) Nicolas Mahut
- Score: 6–4, 5–7, [10–8]

Details
- Draw: 16 (2 WC )
- Seeds: 4

Events
| Singles | Doubles |
| ← 2019 · | ATP Lyon Open | · 2022 → |

Ivan Dodig and Édouard Roger-Vasselin were the defending champions from when the tournament was last held in 2019, but Dodig decided not to participate this year. Roger-Vasselin played alongside Henri Kontinen but lost in the quarterfinals to Matthew Ebden and John-Patrick Smith.

Hugo Nys and Tim Pütz won the title, defeating Pierre-Hugues Herbert and Nicolas Mahut in the final, 6–4, 5–7, [10–8].

== Seeds ==
1. (France) Pierre-Hugues Herbert / (France) Nicolas Mahut (final)
2. (Finland) Henri Kontinen / (France) Édouard Roger-Vasselin (quarterfinals)
3. (United Kingdom) Ken Skupski / (United Kingdom) Neal Skupski (first round)
4. (Monaco) Hugo Nys / (Germany) Tim Pütz (champions)

== Draw ==
=== Key ===
- Q = Qualifier
- WC = Wild card
- LL = Lucky loser
- Alt = Alternate
- ITF = ITF entry
- PR = Protected ranking
- SR = Special ranking
- SE = Special exempt
- JE = Junior exempt
- JR = Junior Accelerator Programme entrant
- CO = College Accelerator Programme entrant
- NG = Next Gen Accelerator Program entrant
- w/o = Walkover
- r = Retired
- d = Defaulted

=== Draw ===
First round
1 | (France) P-H Herbert (France) N Mahut | 6 | 6
(United Kingdom) C Norrie (United Kingdom) J O'Mara | 1 | 1
(New Zealand) A Sitak (Portugal) J Sousa | 6 | 6^{6} | [11]
PR | (Spain) M López (France) F Martin | 4 | 7^{8} | [9]
3 | (United Kingdom) K Skupski (United Kingdom) N Skupski | 6^{3} | 3
(Kazakhstan) A Nedovyesov (Italy) A Vavassori | 7^{7} | 6
(Brazil) M Demoliner (Mexico) S González | 4 | 6 | [10]
WC | (France) G Barrère (France) A Olivetti | 6 | 2 | [6]
(Italy) L Musetti (United States) T Paul | 7 | 6
(Sweden) A Göransson (Belarus) A Vasilevski | 5 | 1
(Netherlands) S Arends (India) D Sharan | 6 | 2 | [1]
4 | (Monaco) H Nys (Germany) T Pütz | 3 | 6 | [10]
(Australia) M Ebden (Australia) J-P Smith | 7^{7} | 6
WC | (Greece) Pe Tsitsipas (Greece) S Tsitsipas | 6^{3} | 3
(Argentina) A Molteni (Denmark) F Nielsen | 2 | 6^{4}
2 | (Finland) H Kontinen (France) É Roger-Vasselin | 6 | 7^{7}

Quarterfinals
1 | (France) P-H Herbert (France) N Mahut | 6 | 6
(New Zealand) A Sitak (Portugal) J Sousa | 1 | 1
(Kazakhstan) A Nedovyesov (Italy) A Vavassori | 6^{1} | 4
(Brazil) M Demoliner (Mexico) S González | 7^{7} | 6
(Italy) L Musetti (United States) T Paul | 3 | 4
4 | (Monaco) H Nys (Germany) T Pütz | 6 | 6
(Australia) M Ebden (Australia) J-P Smith | 6 | 7^{8}
2 | (Finland) H Kontinen (France) É Roger-Vasselin | 0 | 6^{6}

Semifinals
1 | (France) P-H Herbert (France) N Mahut | 7 | 7^{7}
(Brazil) M Demoliner (Mexico) S González | 5 | 6^{4}
4 | (Monaco) H Nys (Germany) T Pütz | 6 | 6
(Australia) M Ebden (Australia) J-P Smith | 3 | 4

Final
1 | (France) P-H Herbert (France) N Mahut | 4 | 7 | [8]
4 | (Monaco) H Nys (Germany) T Pütz | 6 | 5 | [10]
