= 2026 Crete Challenger III =

- Date: 9 – 15 November
- Edition: 9th
- Surface: Hard
- Location: Hersonissos, Greece

Champions

Singles
- (Italy) Michele Ribecai

Doubles
- (Greece) Pavlos Tsitsipas / (Greece) Petros Tsitsipas
- Crete Challenger

The 2026 Crete Challenger III was a professional tennis tournament played on hardcourts. It was the ninth edition of the tournament which was part of the 2026 ATP Challenger Tour. It took place in Hersonissos, Greece between 9 and 15 November 2026.

== Singles main-draw entrants ==
=== Seeds ===
Country	Player	Rank^{1}	Seed
ITA	Francesco Maestrelli	176	1
GBR	Henry Searle	217	2
ITA	Raúl Brancaccio	221	3
SUI	Rémy Bertola	222	4
GBR	Felix Gill	228	5
RSA	Philip Henning	236	6
BIH	Andrej Nedić	246	7
IND	Sumit Nagal	265	8

- ^{1} Rankings are as of 2 November 2026.

=== Other entrants ===
The following players received wildcards into the singles main draw:

- (Cyprus) Melios Efstathiou
- (Greece) Pavlos Tsitsipas
- (Greece) Ioannis Xilas

The following player received entry into the singles main draw using a protected ranking:

- (United Kingdom) Ryan Peniston

The following player received entry into the singles main draw through the Next Gen Accelerator programme:

- (Morocco) Karim Bennani

The following players received entry from the qualifying draw:

- (Bulgaria) Adrian Andreev
- (Italy) Lorenzo Angelini
- (Italy) Lorenzo Carboni
- (Belgium) Jack Logé
- (Finland) Oskari Paldanius
- (France) Benjamin Pietri

== Champions ==
=== Singles ===
- (Italy) Michele Ribecai def. (South Africa) Philip Henning 4–6, 6–2, 6–0.

=== Doubles ===
- (Greece) Pavlos Tsitsipas / (Greece) Petros Tsitsipas def. (Bulgaria) Alex Ganchev / (Luxembourg) Sacha Maes 7–5, 7–6^{(7–4)}.
