= 2021 ATP Lyon Open – Singles =

Tennis competition

Singles
- 2021 ATP Lyon Open

Final
- Champion: (Greece) Stefanos Tsitsipas
- Runner-up: (United Kingdom) Cameron Norrie
- Score: 6–3, 6–3

Details
- Draw: 28 (4 Q / 3 WC )
- Seeds: 8

Events
Singles	Doubles
← 2019 ·	ATP Lyon Open	· 2022 →

Benoît Paire was the defending champion from when the event was last held in 2019, but chose to participate in Geneva instead.

Stefanos Tsitsipas won the title, defeating Cameron Norrie in the final 6–3, 6–3.

== Seeds ==
The top four seeds received a bye into the second round.

1. (Austria) Dominic Thiem (second round)
2. (Greece) Stefanos Tsitsipas (champion)
3. (Argentina) Diego Schwartzman (second round)
4. (Belgium) David Goffin (second round)
5. (France) Gaël Monfils (second round)
6. (Italy) Jannik Sinner (second round)
7. (Canada) Félix Auger-Aliassime (first round)
8. (Russia) Karen Khachanov (semifinals)

== Draw ==
=== Key ===
- Q = Qualifier
- WC = Wild card
- LL = Lucky loser
- Alt = Alternate
- ITF = ITF entry
- PR = Protected ranking
- SR = Special ranking
- SE = Special exempt
- JE = Junior exempt
- JR = Junior Accelerator Programme entrant
- CO = College Accelerator Programme entrant
- NG = Next Gen Accelerator Program entrant
- w/o = Walkover
- r = Retired
- d = Defaulted

=== Finals ===
Semifinals
(United Kingdom) Cameron Norrie	6	6
8	(Russia) Karen Khachanov	1	1
Alt	(Italy) Lorenzo Musetti	6	3	0
2/WC	(Greece) Stefanos Tsitsipas	4	6	6

Final
(United Kingdom) Cameron Norrie	3	3
2/WC	(Greece) Stefanos Tsitsipas	6	6

=== Top half ===
First round
(France) C Moutet	5	3
(United Kingdom) C Norrie	7	6
LL	(France) A Rinderknech	6	6^{4}	6
Q	(Sweden) M Ymer	3	7^{7}	2
(Russia) A Karatsev	6	3	4
6	(Italy) J Sinner	0	6	6
(France) R Gasquet	5	6	6
Q	(France) G Barrère	7	4	3
Q	(Portugal) J Sousa	3	6^{8}
Q	(Poland) K Majchrzak	6	7^{10}
WC	(France) B Bonzi	1	6	6^{4}
8	(Russia) K Khachanov	6	4	7^{7}

Second round
1/WC	(Austria) D Thiem	3	2
(United Kingdom) C Norrie	6	6
LL	(France) A Rinderknech	6^{7}	6	7
6	(Italy) J Sinner	7^{9}	2	5
3	(Argentina) D Schwartzman	3	5
(France) R Gasquet	6	7
Q	(Poland) K Majchrzak	6^{4}	3
8	(Russia) K Khachanov	7^{7}	6

Quarterfinals
(United Kingdom) C Norrie	6	3	6
LL	(France) A Rinderknech	3	6	3
(France) R Gasquet	1	6^{3}
8	(Russia) K Khachanov	6	7^{7}

Semifinals
(United Kingdom) C Norrie	6	6
8	(Russia) K Khachanov	1	1

=== Bottom half ===
First round
7	(Canada) F Auger-Aliassime	6^{3}	6	5
Alt	(Italy) L Musetti	7^{7}	3	7
(France) P-H Herbert	6^{5}	4
(United States) S Korda	7^{7}	6
(Slovenia) A Bedene	6	6
(France) G Simon	2	3
5	(France) G Monfils	7	6
LL	(Brazil) T Seyboth Wild	5	4
(Japan) Y Nishioka	3	6	6
(France) U Humbert	6	3	4
(United States) T Paul	6	6
(France) J-W Tsonga	3	3

Second round
Alt	(Italy) L Musetti	6	1	6
(United States) S Korda	3	6	4
(Slovenia) A Bedene	7^{7}	6
4	(Belgium) D Goffin	6^{4}	3
5	(France) G Monfils	6	3	6^{2}
(Japan) Y Nishioka	4	6	7^{7}
(United States) T Paul	1	4
2/WC	(Greece) S Tsitsipas	6	6

Quarterfinals
Alt	(Italy) L Musetti	6	7^{7}
(Slovenia) A Bedene	3	6^{2}
(Japan) Y Nishioka	3	4
2/WC	(Greece) S Tsitsipas	6	6

Semifinals
Alt	(Italy) L Musetti	6	3	0
2/WC	(Greece) S Tsitsipas	4	6	6

== Qualifying ==
=== Seeds ===
1. (Italy) Lorenzo Musetti (moved to the main draw)
2. (Sweden) Mikael Ymer (qualified)
3. (Portugal) João Sousa (qualified)
4. (France) Grégoire Barrère (qualified)
5. (France) Arthur Rinderknech (qualifying competition, lucky loser)
6. (Brazil) Thiago Seyboth Wild (qualifying competition, lucky loser)
7. (Poland) Kamil Majchrzak (qualified)
8. (France) Antoine Hoang (qualifying competition)

=== Qualifiers ===
1. (Poland) Kamil Majchrzak
2. (Sweden) Mikael Ymer
3. (Portugal) João Sousa
4. (France) Grégoire Barrère

=== Lucky losers ===
1. (France) Arthur Rinderknech
2. (Brazil) Thiago Seyboth Wild

=== Qualifying draw ===
==== First qualifier ====
First round
Alt	(Canada) Peter Polansky	3	4
(Italy) Alessandro Giannessi	6	6
(United Kingdom) Liam Broady	6	6^{2}	4
7	(Poland) Kamil Majchrzak	4	7^{7}	6

Qualifying competition
(Italy) Alessandro Giannessi	4	3
7	(Poland) Kamil Majchrzak	6	6

==== Second qualifier ====
First round
2	(Sweden) Mikael Ymer	6	1	6
(Slovakia) Martin Kližan	3	6	4
WC	(France) Kyrian Jacquet	1	4
6	(Brazil) Thiago Seyboth Wild	6	6

Qualifying competition
2	(Sweden) Mikael Ymer	6	4	6
6	(Brazil) Thiago Seyboth Wild	4	6	1

==== Third qualifier ====
First round
3	(Portugal) João Sousa	6	6
Alt	(Italy) Roberto Marcora	3	4
Alt	(Belgium) Kimmer Coppejans	5	6	6^{2}
5	(France) Arthur Rinderknech	7	3	7^{7}

Qualifying competition
3	(Portugal) João Sousa	6	3	6
5	(France) Arthur Rinderknech	4	6	3

==== Fourth qualifier ====
First round
4	(France) Grégoire Barrère	6	6
(Russia) Evgeny Donskoy	2	3
(Japan) Go Soeda	1	1
8	(France) Antoine Hoang	6	6

Qualifying competition
4	(France) Grégoire Barrère	6	6^{5}	6
8	(France) Antoine Hoang	3	7^{7}	1
