= 2023 Antalya Challenger – Singles =

Singles
- 2023 Antalya Challenger

Final
- Champion: (Hungary) Fábián Marozsán
- Runner-up: (Austria) Sebastian Ofner
- Score: 7–5, 6–0

Events
| Singles | Doubles |
| ← 2021 · | Antalya Challenger |

Evgenii Tiurnev was the defending champion but chose not to defend his title.

Fábián Marozsán won the title after defeating Sebastian Ofner 7–5, 6–0 in the final.

== Seeds ==
1. (Austria) Sebastian Ofner (final)
2. (Hungary) Fábián Marozsán (champion)
3. (Italy) Flavio Cobolli (second round)
4. (Czech Republic) Vít Kopřiva (semifinals)
5. (Czech Republic) Zdeněk Kolář (second round)
6. (Bosnia and Herzegovina) Damir Džumhur (second round)
7. (Australia) Li Tu (first round)
8. (Romania) Nicholas David Ionel (second round)

== Draw ==
=== Key ===
- Q = Qualifier
- WC = Wild card
- LL = Lucky loser
- Alt = Alternate
- ITF = ITF entry
- PR = Protected ranking
- SR = Special ranking
- SE = Special exempt
- JE = Junior exempt
- JR = Junior Accelerator Programme entrant
- CO = College Accelerator Programme entrant
- NG = Next Gen Accelerator Program entrant
- w/o = Walkover
- r = Retired
- d = Defaulted

=== Finals ===
Semifinals
1 | (Austria) Sebastian Ofner | 7^{8} | 7^{7}
(Italy) Gianluca Mager | 6^{6} | 6^{4}
4 | (Czech Republic) Vít Kopřiva | 3 | 2
2 | (Hungary) Fábián Marozsán | 6 | 6

Final
1 | (Austria) Sebastian Ofner | 5 | 0
2 | (Hungary) Fábián Marozsán | 7 | 6

=== Top half ===
First round
1 | (Austria) S Ofner | 7 | 6
WC | (Turkey) Y Erel | 5 | 2
WC | (Turkey) E Kırkın | 3 | 2
(Hungary) M Valkusz | 6 | 6
(Belgium) K Coppejans | 6 | 6
(Croatia) N Serdarušić | 4 | 2
Q | (France) Mathys Erhard | 1 | 3
5 | (Czech Republic) Z Kolář | 6 | 6
3 | (Italy) F Cobolli | 3 | 6 | 7^{7}
Q | (Bosnia and Herzegovina) M Bašić | 6 | 2 | 6^{4}
LL | (Austria) L Neumayer | 2 | 3
(Italy) G Mager | 6 | 6
I Gakhov | 5 | 3
(Bosnia and Herzegovina) N Fatić | 7 | 6
Q | (Italy) G Ferrari | 2 | 3
6 | (Bosnia and Herzegovina) D Džumhur | 6 | 6

Second round
1 | (Austria) S Ofner | 4 | 7 | 7^{7}
(Hungary) M Valkusz | 6 | 5 | 6^{5}
(Belgium) K Coppejans | 3 | 6 | 7^{7}
5 | (Czech Republic) Z Kolář | 6 | 3 | 6^{3}
3 | (Italy) F Cobolli | 0 | 3
(Italy) G Mager | 6 | 6
(Bosnia and Herzegovina) N Fatić | 6 | 3 | 6
6 | (Bosnia and Herzegovina) D Džumhur | 4 | 6 | 4

Quarterfinals
1 | (Austria) S Ofner | 6 | 6
(Belgium) K Coppejans | 4 | 1
(Italy) G Mager | 6 | 1
(Bosnia and Herzegovina) N Fatić | 4 | 0^{r}

Semifinals
1 | (Austria) S Ofner | 7^{8} | 7^{7}
(Italy) G Mager | 6^{6} | 6^{4}

=== Bottom half ===
First round
7 | (Australia) L Tu | 7^{7} | 0 | 2
(Belgium) M Geerts | 6^{0} | 6 | 6
Q | (Italy) S Caruso | 6^{8} | 6 | 6
(Spain) N Sánchez Izquierdo | 7^{10} | 4 | 2
WC | (Lithuania) V Gaubas | 5 | 3
(Canada) S Diez | 7 | 6
Q | (Italy) S Travaglia | 7^{7} | 3 | 4
4 | (Czech Republic) V Kopřiva | 6^{4} | 6 | 6
8 | (Romania) ND Ionel | 7^{7} | 6
(Spain) O Roca Batalla | 6^{3} | 0
(Poland) D Michalski | 4 | 6 | 6
(Portugal) J Domingues | 6 | 0 | 0
(Italy) A Giannessi | 7^{7} | 6
(Germany) Lucas Gerch | 6^{4} | 1
(Serbia) M Zekić | 1 | 5
2 | (Hungary) F Marozsán | 6 | 7

Second round
(Belgium) M Geerts | 6 | 6
Q | (Italy) S Caruso | 4 | 4
(Canada) S Diez | 2 | 0
4 | (Czech Republic) V Kopřiva | 6 | 6
8 | (Romania) ND Ionel | 0 | 3
(Poland) D Michalski | 6 | 6
(Italy) A Giannessi | 6^{5} | 2
2 | (Hungary) F Marozsán | 7^{7} | 6

Quarterfinals
(Belgium) M Geerts | 7^{7} | 5 | 1
4 | (Czech Republic) V Kopřiva | 6^{2} | 7 | 6
(Poland) D Michalski | 6 | 1 | 2
2 | (Hungary) F Marozsán | 1 | 6 | 6

Semifinals
4 | (Czech Republic) V Kopřiva | 3 | 2
2 | (Hungary) F Marozsán | 6 | 6
