= 2026 Crete Challenger III – Singles =

Singles
- 2026 Crete Challenger III

Final
- Champion: (Italy) Michele Ribecai
- Runner-up: (South Africa) Philip Henning
- Score: 4–6, 6–2, 6–0

Events
Singles	Doubles
- Crete Challenger

Toby Samuel was the defending champion but chose not to defend his title.

Michele Ribecai won the title after defeating Philip Henning 4–6, 6–2, 6–0 in the final.

== Seeds ==
1. (Italy) Francesco Maestrelli (semifinals)
2. (United Kingdom) Henry Searle (semifinals)
3. (Italy) Raúl Brancaccio (second round, retired)
4. (Switzerland) Rémy Bertola (first round)
5. (United Kingdom) Felix Gill (second round)
6. (South Africa) Philip Henning (final)
7. (Bosnia and Herzegovina) Andrej Nedić (first round)
8. (India) Sumit Nagal (quarterfinals)

== Draw ==
Key

- Q = Qualifier
- WC = Wild card
- LL = Lucky loser
- Alt = Alternate
- ITF = ITF entry
- PR = Protected ranking
- SR = Special ranking
- SE = Special exempt
- JE = Junior exempt
- JR = Junior Accelerator Programme entrant
- CO = College Accelerator Programme entrant
- NG = Next Gen Accelerator Program entrant
- w/o = Walkover
- r = Retired
- d = Defaulted

=== Finals ===
Semifinals
1	(Italy) Francesco Maestrelli	5	6	6^{3}
6	(South Africa) Philip Henning	7	3	7^{7}
(Italy) Michele Ribecai	6	6
2	(United Kingdom) Henry Searle	3	1

Final
6	(South Africa) Philip Henning	6	2	0
(Italy) Michele Ribecai	4	6	6

=== Top half ===
First round
1	(Italy) F Maestrelli	6	6
Q	(Belgium) Jack Logé	3	1
(United Kingdom) J Monday	6	6
(Ukraine) G Kravchenko	3	4
(Belgium) M Geerts	7^{7}	1	6
(Italy) Juan Cruz Martin Manzano	6^{5}	6	3
NG	(Morocco) K Bennani	1	0
8	(India) S Nagal	6	6
4	(Switzerland) R Bertola	6^{3}	5
Q	(Italy) Lorenzo Carboni	7^{7}	7
WC	(Greece) Ioannis Xilas	4	6	6
(Uzbekistan) S Fomin	6	0	2
WC	(Greece) Pa Tsitsipas	6	6^{7}	0
(Romania) C Crețu	2	7^{9}	6
(Romania) Radu Mihai Papoe	2	5
6	(South Africa) P Henning	6	7

Second round
1	(Italy) F Maestrelli	6	6
(United Kingdom) J Monday	3	3
(Belgium) M Geerts	6^{4}	4
8	(India) S Nagal	7^{7}	6
Q	(Italy) L Carboni	6	6
WC	(Greece) I Xilas	3	0
(Romania) C Crețu	1	1
6	(South Africa) P Henning	6	6

Quarterfinals
1	(Italy) F Maestrelli	6	6^{6}	6
8	(India) S Nagal	4	7^{8}	2
Q	(Italy) L Carboni	1	2
6	(South Africa) P Henning	6	6

Semifinals
1	(Italy) F Maestrelli	5	6	6^{3}
6	(South Africa) P Henning	7	3	7^{7}

=== Bottom half ===
First round
7	(Bosnia and Herzegovina) A Nedić	2	6	2
(Italy) M Ribecai	6	2	6
(Italy) CA Caniato	6	4	6
(Belgium) GA Bailly	3	6	3
Q	(Bulgaria) A Andreev	6	7^{7}
Q	(France) Benjamin Pietri	2	6^{1}
Q	(Finland) O Paldanius	7	2	4
3	(Italy) R Brancaccio	5	6	6
5	(United Kingdom) F Gill	6	7^{7}
WC	(Cyprus) M Efstathiou	4	6^{5}
(Italy) Massimo Giunta	6	6
(Italy) F Forti	3	2
Q	(Italy) Lorenzo Angelini	3	6	4
(France) R Bertrand	6	4	6
PR	(United Kingdom) R Peniston	2	3
2	(United Kingdom) H Searle	6	6

Second round
(Italy) M Ribecai	6	7
(Italy) CA Caniato	2	5
Q	(Bulgaria) A Andreev	7^{8}	3
3	(Italy) R Brancaccio	6^{6}	0^{r}
5	(United Kingdom) F Gill	0	1
(Italy) M Giunta	6	6
(France) R Bertrand	3	3
2	(United Kingdom) H Searle	6	6

Quarterfinals
(Italy) M Ribecai	7^{8}	0
Q	(Bulgaria) A Andreev	6^{6}	0^{r}
(Italy) M Giunta	6	0	6^{4}
2	(United Kingdom) H Searle	4	6	7^{7}

Semifinals
(Italy) M Ribecai	6	6
2	(United Kingdom) H Searle	3	1
