= 2022 ATP Lyon Open – Doubles =

Doubles
- 2022 ATP Lyon Open

Final
- Champions: (Croatia) Ivan Dodig (United States) Austin Krajicek
- Runners-up: (Argentina) Máximo González (Brazil) Marcelo Melo
- Score: 6–3, 6–4

Events
| Singles | Doubles |
| ← 2021 · | ATP Lyon Open | · 2023 → |

Ivan Dodig and Austin Krajicek defeated Máximo González and Marcelo Melo in the final, 6–3, 6–4 to win the doubles tennis title at the 2022 ATP Lyon Open.

Hugo Nys and Tim Pütz were the defending champions but only Nys chose to defend his title, partnering Jan Zieliński. Nys lost in the first round to González and Melo.

== Seeds ==
1. (Croatia) Ivan Dodig / (United States) Austin Krajicek (champions)
2. (Argentina) Máximo González / (Brazil) Marcelo Melo (final)
3. (Belgium) Sander Gillé / (Belgium) Joran Vliegen (quarterfinals)
4. (Sweden) André Göransson / (Japan) Ben McLachlan (quarterfinals)

== Draw ==
=== Key ===
- Q = Qualifier
- WC = Wild card
- LL = Lucky loser
- Alt = Alternate
- SE = Special exempt
- PR = Protected ranking
- ITF = ITF entry
- JE = Junior exempt
- w/o = Walkover
- r = Retired
- d = Defaulted
- SR = Special ranking

=== Draw ===
First round
1 | (Croatia) I Dodig (United States) A Krajicek | 6 | 6^{2} | [10]
WC | (France) U Humbert (France) T Lamasine | 4 | 7^{7} | [0]
(France) N Mahut (France) A Rinderknech | 4 | 2
(Brazil) R Matos (Spain) D Vega Hernández | 6 | 6
4 | (Sweden) A Göransson (Japan) B McLachlan | w/o
(Germany) D Altmaier (Germany) O Otte
Alt | (United States) M Schnur (New Zealand) A Sitak | 6 | 6
(Uruguay) A Behar (Israel) J Erlich | 3 | 3
(Kazakhstan) A Nedovyesov (Pakistan) A-u-H Qureshi | 7^{7} | 7^{7}
WC | (France) U Blanchet (France) A Olivetti | 6^{5} | 6^{5}
(Australia) M Ebden (United States) J Withrow | 3 | 4
3 | (Belgium) S Gillé (Belgium) J Vliegen | 6 | 6
(Poland) Ł Kubot (France) É Roger-Vasselin | 1 | 6^{2}
(South Africa) R Klaasen (United States) N Lammons | 6 | 7^{7}
(Monaco) H Nys (Poland) J Zieliński | 4 | 6 | [6]
2 | (Argentina) M González (Brazil) M Melo | 6 | 3 | [10]

Quarterfinals
1 | (Croatia) I Dodig (United States) A Krajicek | 6^{4} | 6 | [12]
(Brazil) R Matos (Spain) D Vega Hernández | 7^{7} | 2 | [10]
4 | (Sweden) A Göransson (Japan) B McLachlan | 6^{5} | 6 | [4]
Alt | (United States) M Schnur (New Zealand) A Sitak | 7^{7} | 4 | [10]
(Kazakhstan) A Nedovyesov (Pakistan) A-u-H Qureshi | 6 | 7^{7}
3 | (Belgium) S Gillé (Belgium) J Vliegen | 3 | 6^{4}
(South Africa) R Klaasen (United States) N Lammons | 6 | 6^{5} | [4]
2 | (Argentina) M González (Brazil) M Melo | 2 | 7^{7} | [10]

Semifinals
1 | (Croatia) I Dodig (United States) A Krajicek | 6 | 6
Alt | (United States) M Schnur (New Zealand) A Sitak | 1 | 2
(Kazakhstan) A Nedovyesov (Pakistan) A-u-H Qureshi | 5 | 4
2 | (Argentina) M González (Brazil) M Melo | 7 | 6

Final
1 | (Croatia) I Dodig (United States) A Krajicek | 6 | 6
2 | (Argentina) M González (Brazil) M Melo | 3 | 4
