= 2023 Antalya Challenger =

- Date: 6–12 March
- Edition: 5th
- Surface: Clay
- Location: Antalya, Turkey

Champions

Singles
- (Hungary) Fábián Marozsán

Doubles
- (Sweden) Filip Bergevi / (Greece) Petros Tsitsipas
← 2021 ·	Antalya Challenger

The 2023 Antalya Challenger was a professional tennis tournament played on clay courts. It was the fifth edition of the tournament which was part of the 2023 ATP Challenger Tour. It took place in Antalya, Turkey between 6 and 12 March 2023.

== Singles main-draw entrants ==
=== Seeds ===
Country	Player	Rank^{1}	Seed
AUT	Sebastian Ofner	158	1
HUN	Fábián Marozsán	161	2
ITA	Flavio Cobolli	166	3
CZE	Vít Kopřiva	168	4
CZE	Zdeněk Kolář	174	5
BIH	Damir Džumhur	206	6
AUS	Li Tu	209	7
ROU	Nicholas David Ionel	222	8

- ^{1} Rankings as of 27 February 2023.

=== Other entrants ===
The following players received wildcards into the singles main draw:

- (Turkey) Yankı Erel
- (Lithuania) Vilius Gaubas
- (Turkey) Ergi Kırkın

The following players received entry from the qualifying draw:

- (Bosnia and Herzegovina) Mirza Bašić
- (Italy) Salvatore Caruso
- (France) Mathys Erhard
- (Italy) Gianmarco Ferrari
- (Austria) ~~Gerald Melzer~~
- (Italy) Stefano Travaglia

The following player received entry as a lucky loser:

- (Austria) Lukas Neumayer

== Champions ==
=== Singles ===
- (Hungary) Fábián Marozsán def. (Austria) Sebastian Ofner 7–5, 6–0.

=== Doubles ===
- (Sweden) Filip Bergevi / (Greece) Petros Tsitsipas def. (Turkey) Sarp Ağabigün / (Turkey) Ergi Kırkın 6–2, 6–4.
