= Petros Tsitsipas =

Greek tennis player (born 2000)

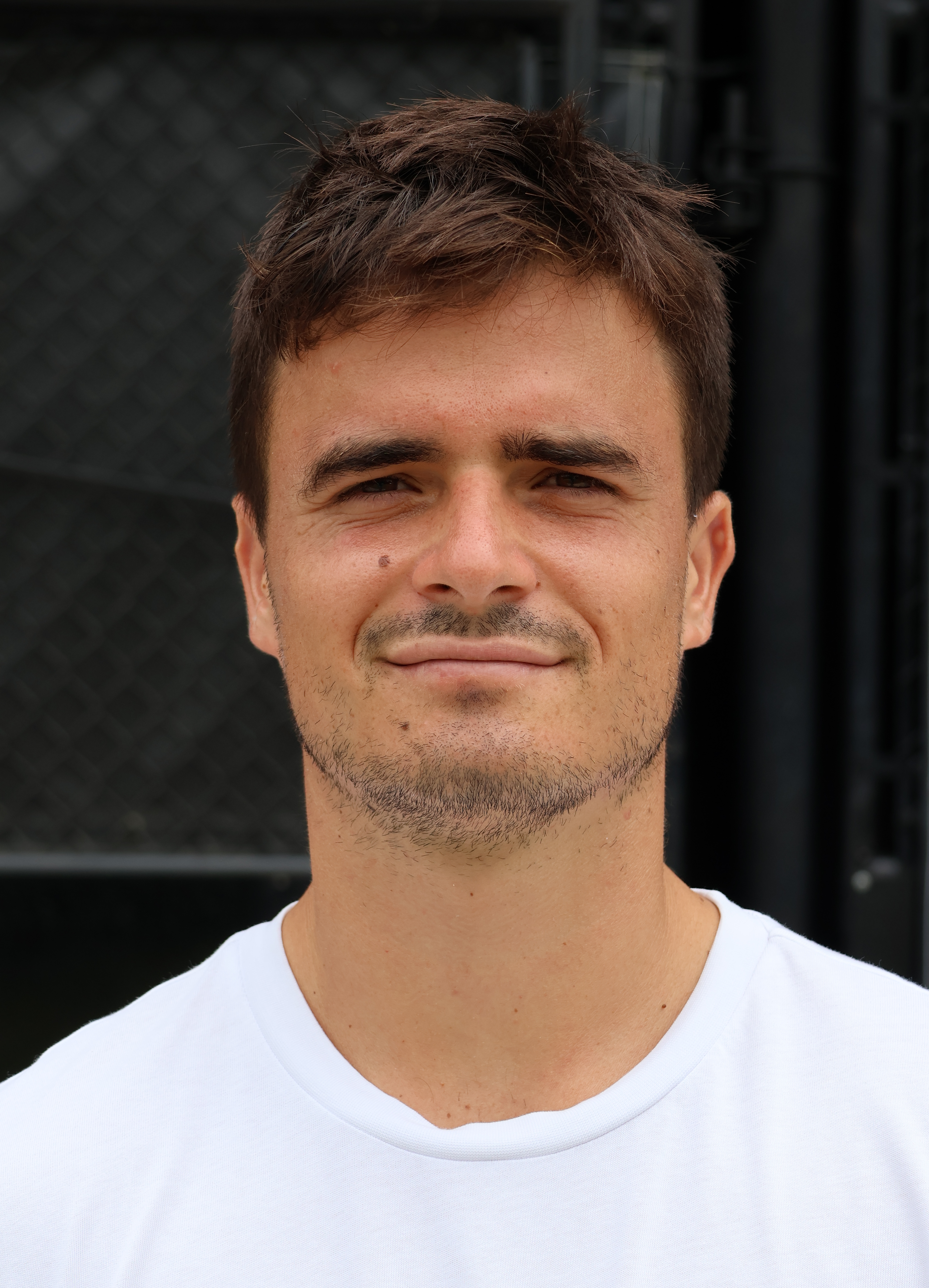
- Tsitsipas in 2023
- Country (sports): Greece
- Born: 27 July 2000 (age 26)
- Height: 1.85 m (6 ft 1 in)
- Turned pro: 2019
- Plays: Right-handed (one-handed backhand)
- Coach: Stephan de Kock
- Prize money: US $512,762

Singles
- Career record: 3–4
- Career titles: 0
- Highest ranking: No. 727 (30 August 2021)
- Current ranking: No. 990 (19 October 2026)

Other tournaments
- Olympic Games: 1R (2024)

Doubles
- Career record: 21–59
- Career titles: 1
- Highest ranking: No. 72 (10 June 2024)
- Current ranking: No. 366 (19 October 2026)

Grand Slam doubles results
- Australian Open: 2R (2023, 2025)
- French Open: QF (2024)
- Wimbledon: 1R (2021, 2023, 2024)
- US Open: 2R (2023)

Other doubles tournaments
- Olympic Games: 1R (2024)
- Last updated on: 19 October 2026.

Petros Tsitsipas (Greek: Πέτρος Τσιτσιπάς, pronounced [ˈpetros t͡sit͡siˈpas]; born 27 July 2000) is a Greek professional tennis player who specialises in doubles. He has a career-high ATP doubles ranking of world No. 72 achieved on 10 June 2024 and a singles ranking of No. 727 achieved on 30 August 2021.

He is the younger brother of Stefanos Tsitsipas with whom he has won one doubles title. Tsitsipas represents Greece at the Davis Cup, where he has a W–L record of 10–9.

== Career ==
=== 2021–2026: ATP singles and doubles debut, 16 wildcards with Stefanos, 100th career wildcard ===
The brothers first partnered at the 2021 Australian Open, where they received their first team wildcard to the main draw but lost in the first round. The next two tournaments were the 2021 Rotterdam Open and 2021 Open 13 Provence in Marseille, France where they entered as main draw wildcards and lost in the second and first rounds respectively.

Petros made his ATP singles debut as a wildcard as well to the main draw of the event at the 2021 Open 13, but lost to Alejandro Davidovich Fokina in the first round in 45 minutes. The misuse of wildcards in that case of Petros Tsitsipas individually and in general for the brothers has been brought up by players and fans.

They next partnered at the 2021 Monte-Carlo Masters after receiving a fourth team wildcard to the event. They reached the round of 16 by beating 8th seeded Kevin Krawietz and Horia Tecău. The pair received yet another wildcard for the next Masters 1000 at the 2021 Mutua Madrid Open but lost again in the first round. They served as alternates in a third Masters in a row at the Italian Open but lost for the fourth time in the first round. At the 2021 ATP Lyon Open, Petros and Stefanos received their sixth wildcard in doubles but lost the first round match. This was the fifth loss in seven tournaments, in the first round, since the beginning of the year.

The brothers received their second Grand Slam and seventh wildcard for the year at the 2021 Wimbledon Championships, losing in the first round. They also received their eight wildcard at the 2021 Hamburg European Open, losing in the first round.

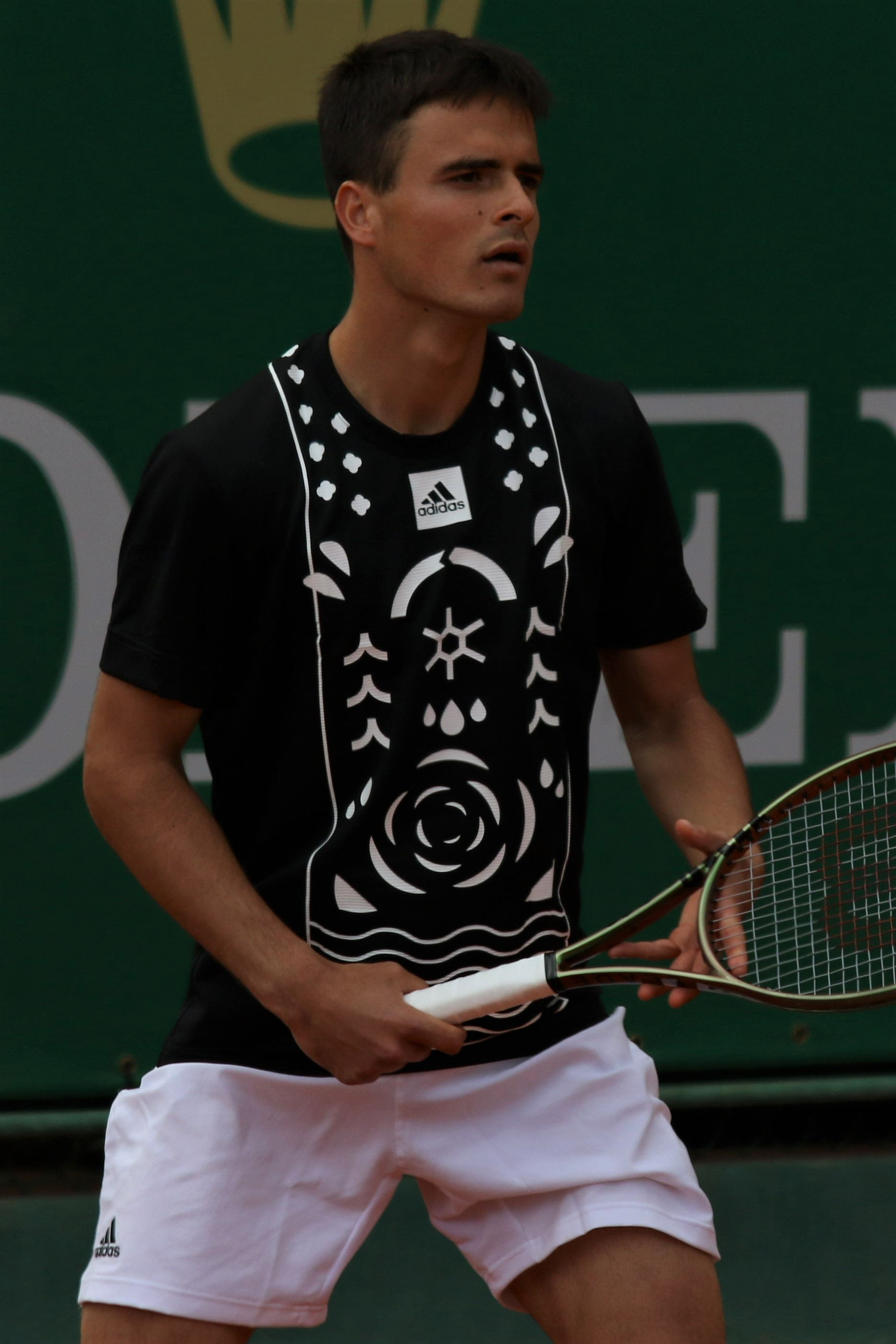
Tsitsipas at the 2022 Monte-Carlo Masters

The brothers received two more wildcards at the 2022 Monte-Carlo Masters and 2022 Mutua Madrid Open, where they lost in the second and first rounds respectively. They also received their eleventh and twelfth wildcard in Stuttgart and at the 2022 Mallorca Championships where they also lost in the second and first rounds respectively. They entered the 2022 US Open as an alternate pair where they lost in the first round.

The brothers again received a wildcard at the 2023 ABN AMRO Open in Rotterdam, their thirteenth in two years, where they lost in the first round. Petros Tsitsipas again partnering French Luca Sanchez received his fourteenth wildcard to the main draw of the 2023 Open 13 Provence in Marseille. They received wildcards again, their fourteenth and fifteenth as a team, for the 2023 Monte-Carlo Masters and the 2023 Mutua Madrid Open. It was Petros's 100th wildcard in his career.

He received a wildcard for the 2023 Mallorca Championships with Bart Stevens. At the 2023 Wimbledon Championships the brothers lost again in the first round to French teenagers Arthur Fils and Luca Van Assche.

Petros and Stefanos Tsitsipas won their first doubles ATP title in Antwerp, defeating Ariel Behar and Adam Pavlásek in the final.

He received his 16th wildcard with Stefanos at the 2024 Mutua Madrid Open.

He competed in the 2024 Summer Olympics in two events: in the men's singles, following the withdrawal of British player Cameron Norrie, where he was defeated in straight sets by Dutch player Tallon Griekspoor, and in the men's doubles alongside his brother Stefanos, where they were also defeated by the Portuguese pair Nuno Borges and Francisco Cabral.

In February 2025, he received his 17th wildcard this time partnering with brother Pavlos Tsitsipas at the 2025 Dubai Tennis Championships. Ranked No. 996 he received yet another wildcard for the singles qualifying draw at the 2025 Mallorca Championships.

In November 2026, he won his fifth ATP Challenger doubles title at the 2026 Crete Challenger III, partnering his brother, Pavlos, to defeat Alex Ganchev and Sacha Maes in the final.

== Doubles performance timeline ==
Key
W	F	SF	QF	#R	RR	Q#	DNQ	A	NH

(W) winner; (F) finalist; (SF) semifinalist; (QF) quarterfinalist; (#R) rounds 4, 3, 2, 1; (RR) round-robin stage; (Q#) qualification round; (DNQ) did not qualify; (A) absent; (NH) not held; (SR) strike rate (events won / competed); (W–L) win–loss record.
To avoid confusion and double counting, these charts are updated at the conclusion of a tournament or when the player's participation has ended.

Tournament	2019	2020	2021	2022	2023	2024	2025	SR	W–L
Grand Slam tournaments
Australian Open	A	A	1R	A	2R	1R	2R	0 / 4	2–4
French Open	A	A	A	A	1R	QF	1R	0 / 3	3–3
Wimbledon	A	NH	1R	A	1R	1R	A	0 / 3	0–3
US Open	A	A	A	1R	2R	A	A	0 / 2	1–2
Win–loss	0–0	0–0	0–2	0–1	2–4	3–3	1–2	0 / 12	6–12
ATP Tour Masters 1000
Indian Wells Masters	A	NH	A	A	A	A	A	0 / 0	0–0
Miami Open	A	NH	A	A	A	A	A	0 / 0	0–0
Monte-Carlo Masters	A	NH	2R	2R	2R	A	2R	0 / 4	4–4
Madrid Open	A	NH	1R	1R	1R	1R	A	0 / 4	0–4
Italian Open	A	A	1R	A	A	A	A	0 / 1	0–1
Canadian Open	A	NH	A	A	A	A	A	0 / 0	0–0
Cincinnati Masters	A	A	A	A	A	A	A	0 / 0	0–0
Shanghai Masters	A	NH			A	1R	A	0 / 1	0–1
Paris Masters	A	A	A	A	A	A	A	0 / 0	0–0
Win–loss	0–0	0–0	1–3	1–2	1–2	0–2	1–1	0 / 10	4–10
Career statistics
Tournaments	1	2	9	7	11	12	6	48	
Overall win–loss	0–1	0–4	2–10	3–9	8–12	6–13	2–8	21–57	
Year-end ranking	1077	813	218	145	97	105	224		

== ATP Tour finals ==
=== Doubles: 1 (title) ===
Legend Grand Slam (0–0) ATP 1000 (0–0) ATP 500 (0–0) ATP 250 (1–0)	Finals by surface Hard (1–0) Clay (0–0) Grass (0–0)	Finals by setting Outdoor (0–0) Indoor (1–0)

Result	W–L	Date	Tournament	Tier	Surface	Partner	Opponents	Score
Win	1–0	Oct 2023	European Open, Belgium	ATP 250	Hard (i)	(Greece) Stefanos Tsitsipas	(Uruguay) Ariel Behar (Czech Republic) Adam Pavlásek	6–7^{(5–7)}, 6–4, [10–8]

== ATP Challenger Tour finals ==
=== Doubles: 10 (5 titles, 5 runner-ups) ===
Legend ATP Challenger Tour (5–5)	Finals by surface Hard (3–3) Clay (2–2)

Result	W–L	Date	Tournament	Tier	Surface	Partner	Opponents	Score
Win	1–0	Aug 2021	Prague Open, Czech Republic	Challenger	Clay	(Romania) Victor Vlad Cornea	(Czech Republic) Martin Krumich (Czech Republic) Andrew Paulson	6–3, 3–6, [10–8]
Loss	1–1	Oct 2022	Brest Challenger, France	Challenger	Hard (i)	(Sweden) Filip Bergevi	(Norway) Viktor Durasovic (Finland) Otto Virtanen	4–6, 4–6
Loss	1–2	Nov 2022	HPP Open, Finland	Challenger	Hard (i)	(United States) Reese Stalder	(India) Purav Raja (India) Divij Sharan	7–6^{(7–5)}, 3–6, [8–10]
Win	2–2	Mar 2023	Antalya Challenger, Turkey	Challenger	Clay	(Sweden) Filip Bergevi	(Turkey) Sarp Ağabigün (Turkey) Ergi Kırkın	6–2, 6–4
Loss	2–3	May 2023	Internazionali d'Abruzzo, Italy	Challenger	Clay	(Netherlands) Sander Arends	(Colombia) Nicolás Barrientos (Uruguay) Ariel Behar	6–7^{(1–7)}, 6–3, [6–10]
Win	3–3	Feb 2024	Bahrain Tennis Challenger, Bahrain	Challenger	Hard	(Spain) Sergio Martos Gornés	(United States) Vasil Kirkov (Finland) Patrik Niklas-Salminen	3–6, 6–3, [10–8]
Loss	3–4	April 2024	Open de Oeiras, Portugal	Challenger	Clay	(Spain) Sergio Martos Gornés	(Netherlands) Mick Veldheer (Sweden) Filip Bergevi	1–6, 4–6
Loss	3–5	Aug 2024	Cary Tennis Classic, US	Challenger	Hard	(Argentina) Federico Agustín Gómez	(Australia) John Peers (Australia) John-Patrick Smith	walkover
Win	4–5	Mar 2025	Crete Challenger II, Greece	Challenger	Hard	(Greece) Stefanos Sakellaridis	Ilia Simakin (Canada) Kelsey Stevenson	6–2, 6–2
Win	5–5	Nov 2026	Crete Challenger III, Greece	Challenger	Hard	(Greece) Pavlos Tsitsipas	(Bulgaria) Alex Ganchev (Luxembourg) Sacha Maes	7–5, 7–6^{(7–4)}

== ITF Tour finals ==
=== Singles: 3 (3 runner-ups) ===
Legend ITF WTT (0–3)

Result	W–L	Date	Tournament	Tier	Surface	Opponent	Score
Loss	0–1	Jul 2021	M25 Ajaccio, France	WTT	Hard	(France) Clément Chidekh	3–6, 0–6
Loss	0–2	May 2025	M15 Heraklion, Greece	WTT	Hard	(Germany) Louis Wessels	6–3, 5–7, 2–6
Loss	0–3	Nov 2025	M15 Heraklion, Greece	WTT	Hard	(Sweden) William Rejchtman Vinciguerra	4–6, 6–3, 4–6

=== Doubles: 17 (11 titles, 6 runner-ups) ===
Legend ITF Futures/WTT (11–6)	Finals by surface Hard (6–5) Clay (5–1)

Result	W–L	Date	Tournament	Tier	Surface	Partner	Opponents	Score
Loss	0–1	Aug 2016	Italy F10	Futures	Clay	(Greece) Stefanos Tsitsipas	(Argentina) Franco Agamenone (Argentina) Mateo Nicolás Martínez	2–6, 2–6
Loss	0–2	Oct 2018	Tunisia F34	Futures	Hard	(Croatia) Duje Ajduković	(Brazil) Bernardo Azevedo (Germany) Robert Strombachs	4–6, 7–6^{(8–6)}, [6–10]
Loss	0–3	Nov 2018	Greece F8	Futures	Hard	(Russia) Markos Kalovelonis	(Czech Republic) Vít Kopřiva (Austria) David Pichler	2–6, 6–4, [7–10]
Loss	0–4	May 2019	M15 Heraklion, Greece	WTT	Hard	(Greece) Michail Pervolarakis	(United Kingdom) Lloyd Glasspool (United Kingdom) Aidan McHugh	6–7^{(5–7)}, 6–7^{(2–7)}
Win	1–4	Sep 2020	M15 Monastir, Tunisia	WTT	Hard	(Greece) Aristotelis Thanos	(Argentina) Matías Franco Descotte (Argentina) Thiago Agustín Tirante	6–3, 6–4
Win	2–4	Jul 2021	M25 Kottingbrunn, Austria	WTT	Clay	(Latvia) Martins Podzus	(Czech Republic) David Poljak (Russia) Alexander Shevchenko	6–3, 6–3
Win	3–4	Aug 2021	M25 Bolzano, Italy	WTT	Clay	(Romania) Victor Vlad Cornea	(Italy) Marco Bortolotti (Brazil) Daniel Dutra da Silva	6–3, 6–4
Win	4–4	Aug 2021	M15 Oldenzaal, Netherlands	WTT	Clay	(Germany) Constantin Schmitz	(United Kingdom) Jonathan Binding (United Kingdom) Mark Whitehouse	7–6^{(7–4)}, 6–4
Win	5–4	Nov 2021	M25 Saint-Dizier, France	WTT	Hard (i)	(Bulgaria) Alexander Donski	(Australia) Blake Ellis (Australia) Tristan Schoolkate	6–4, 4–6, [10–7]
Win	6–4	Nov 2021	M25 Villers-lès-Nancy, France	WTT	Hard (i)	(Bulgaria) Alexander Donski	(Australia) Blake Ellis (Australia) Tristan Schoolkate	7–6^{(7–2)}, 3–2 ret.
Win	7–4	Mar 2022	M25 Poreč, Croatia	WTT	Clay	(Greece) Aristotelis Thanos	(France) Titouan Droguet (Turkey) Ergi Kırkın	7–6^{(7–4)}, 4–6, [10–7]
Win	8–4	Mar 2022	M25 Opatija, Croatia	WTT	Clay	(Croatia) Zvonimir Babić	(Italy) Riccardo Bonadio (Czech Republic) Michael Vrbenský	6–3, 4–6, [10–8]
Loss	8–5	Nov 2023	M15 Heraklion, Greece	WTT	Hard	(Greece) Pavlos Tsitsipas	(Austria) Neil Oberleitner (Austria) Joel Schwärzler	6–7^{(4–7)}, 2–6
Win	9–5	Nov 2024	M15 Heraklion, Greece	WTT	Hard	(Greece) Christos Antonopoulos	(Cyprus) Eleftherios Neos (Cyprus) Menelaos Efstathiou	6–2, 6–1
Win	10–5	May 2025	M15 Heraklion, Greece	WTT	Hard	(Estonia) Kristjan Tamm	(Australia) Tai Sach (Australia) Ethan Cook	6–2, 6–4
Loss	10–6	May 2025	M15 Heraklion, Greece	WTT	Hard	(Estonia) Kristjan Tamm	(Portugal) Diogo Marques (Australia) Ethan Cook	6–4, 4–6, [6–10]
Win	11–6	Nov 2025	M15 Heraklion, Greece	WTT	Hard	(Greece) Pavlos Tsitsipas	(South Africa) Vasilios Caripi (Greece) Dimitris Sakellaridis	4–6, 6–3, [12–10]
