= 2022 ATP Lyon Open – Singles =

Singles
- 2022 ATP Lyon Open

Final
- Champion: (United Kingdom) Cameron Norrie
- Runner-up: (Slovakia) Alex Molčan
- Score: 6–3, 6–7^{(3–7)}, 6–1

Details
- Draw: 28 (4 Q / 3 WC )
- Seeds: 8

Events
Singles	Doubles
← 2021 ·	ATP Lyon Open	· 2023 →

Cameron Norrie defeated Alex Molčan in the final, 6–3, 6–7^{(3–7)}, 6–1 to win the singles tennis title at the 2022 ATP Lyon Open. Norrie became the first Briton to win a clay court title on the ATP Tour since 2016.

Stefanos Tsitsipas was the defending champion, but chose not to participate.

== Seeds ==
The top four seeds receive a bye into the second round.

1. (United Kingdom) Cameron Norrie (champion)
2. (Spain) Pablo Carreño Busta (second round)
3. (France) Gaël Monfils (withdrew due to injury)
4. (Australia) Alex de Minaur (semifinals)
5. Karen Khachanov (second round)
6. Aslan Karatsev (first round)
7. (Argentina) Sebastián Báez (quarterfinals)
8. (Spain) Pedro Martínez (first round)

== Draw ==
=== Key ===
- Q = Qualifier
- WC = Wild card
- LL = Lucky loser
- Alt = Alternate
- SE = Special exempt
- PR = Protected ranking
- ITF = ITF entry
- JE = Junior exempt
- w/o = Walkover
- r = Retired
- d = Defaulted
- SR = Special ranking

=== Finals ===
Semifinals
1	(United Kingdom) Cameron Norrie	6	5	6
(Denmark) Holger Rune	2	7	4
4	(Australia) Alex de Minaur	6^{2}	2
(Slovakia) Alex Molčan	7^{7}	6

Final
1	(United Kingdom) Cameron Norrie	6	6^{3}	6
(Slovakia) Alex Molčan	3	7^{7}	1

=== Top half ===
First round
(Argentina) F Cerúndolo	6	3	6
(Australia) J Duckworth	2	6	3
WC	(France) L Pouille	3	1
(Germany) O Otte	6	6
Q	(Argentina) TM Etcheverry	2	1
7	(Argentina) S Báez	6	6
WC	(France) H Gaston	4	7^{7}	2
Q	(France) M Guinard	6	6^{5}	6
(France) A Rinderknech	6^{4}	6^{3}
(Denmark) H Rune	7^{7}	7^{7}
(France) A Mannarino	7^{9}	6
6	A Karatsev	6^{7}	4

Second round
1	(United Kingdom) C Norrie	6	6
(Argentina) F Cerúndolo	4	4
(Germany) O Otte	7	4	2
7	(Argentina) S Báez	5	6	6
LL	(United States) M Mmoh	6	4	5
Q	(France) M Guinard	4	6	7
(Denmark) H Rune	6	6
(France) A Mannarino	4	3

Quarterfinals
1	(United Kingdom) C Norrie	6	4	7
7	(Argentina) S Báez	4	6	5
Q	(France) M Guinard	6	3	4
(Denmark) H Rune	3	6	6

Semifinals
1	(United Kingdom) C Norrie	6	5	6
(Denmark) H Rune	2	7	4

=== Bottom half ===
First round
8	(Spain) P Martínez	7^{7}	4	2
LL	(Japan) Yo Watanuki	6^{2}	6	6
(South Korea) S-w Kwon	4	7^{7}	6
PR	(Slovenia) A Bedene	6	6^{4}	0
Q	(France) G Barrère	3	4
(France) U Humbert	6	6
5	K Khachanov	6	6
Q	(France) G Simon	1	4
(Slovakia) A Molčan	6	6
WC	(France) J-W Tsonga	4	4
(Germany) D Altmaier	3	6	3
(Argentina) F Coria	6	3	6

Second round
LL	(Japan) Yo Watanuki	6	6
(South Korea) S-w Kwon	3	4
(France) U Humbert	6	3	2
4	(Australia) A de Minaur	1	6	6
5	K Khachanov	2	6^{4}
(Slovakia) A Molčan	6	7^{7}
(Argentina) F Coria	7	6
2	(Spain) P Carreño Busta	5	3

Quarterfinals
LL	(Japan) Yo Watanuki	4	0^{r}
4	(Australia) A de Minaur	6	0
(Slovakia) A Molčan	6	6
(Argentina) F Coria	3	2

Semifinals
4	(Australia) A de Minaur	6^{2}	2
(Slovakia) A Molčan	7^{7}	6

== Qualifying ==
=== Seeds ===
1. (Spain) Carlos Taberner (first round)
2. (Argentina) Tomás Martín Etcheverry (qualified)
3. (Japan) Yoshihito Nishioka (first round)
4. (Sweden) Mikael Ymer (first round)
5. (France) Manuel Guinard (qualified)
6. (France) Gilles Simon (qualified)
7. (United States) Michael Mmoh (qualifying competition, lucky loser)
8. (France) Grégoire Barrère (qualified)

=== Qualifiers ===
1. (France) Grégoire Barrère
2. (Argentina) Tomás Martín Etcheverry
3. (France) Manuel Guinard
4. (France) Gilles Simon

=== Lucky losers ===
1. (United States) Michael Mmoh
2. (Japan) Yosuke Watanuki

=== Qualifying draw ===
==== First qualifier ====
First round
1	(Spain) Carlos Taberner	3	4
(Japan) Yosuke Watanuki	6	6
(Canada) Steven Diez	6	1	4
8/Alt	(France) Grégoire Barrère	4	6	6

Qualifying competition
(Japan) Yosuke Watanuki	3	6	3
8/Alt	(France) Grégoire Barrère	6	3	6

==== Second qualifier ====
First round
2	(Argentina) Tomás Martín Etcheverry	6	6
WC	(France) Mayeul Darras	4	2
(Serbia) Miljan Zekić	3^{r}
7	(United States) Michael Mmoh	4

Qualifying competition
2	(Argentina) Tomás Martín Etcheverry	7^{8}	6
7	(United States) Michael Mmoh	6^{6}	3

==== Third qualifier ====
First round
3	(Japan) Yoshihito Nishioka	1	1
WC	(France) Ugo Blanchet	6	6
(France) Tristan Lamasine	1	3
5	(France) Manuel Guinard	6	6

Qualifying competition
WC	(France) Ugo Blanchet	7^{9}	0	4
5	(France) Manuel Guinard	6^{7}	6	6

==== Fourth qualifier ====
First round
4	(Sweden) Mikael Ymer	4	1
(Bosnia and Herzegovina) Nerman Fatić	6	6
(Germany) Matthias Bachinger	2	4
6/Alt	(France) Gilles Simon	6	6

Qualifying competition
(Bosnia and Herzegovina) Nerman Fatić	0	5
6/Alt	(France) Gilles Simon	6	7
