= 2022 ATP Lyon Open =

Tennis competition

- Date: 15–21 May
- Edition: 5th
- Category: ATP Tour 250
- Draw: 28S/16Q/16D
- Prize money: €597,900
- Surface: Clay / outdoor
- Location: Lyon, France
- Venue: Vélodrome Georges Préveral

Champions

Singles
- (United Kingdom) Cameron Norrie

Doubles
- (Croatia) Ivan Dodig / (United States) Austin Krajicek
- ATP Lyon Open

The 2022 ATP Lyon Open, also known as the Open Parc Auvergne-Rhône-Alpes Lyon, was a men's tennis tournament played on outdoor clay courts. It was the 5th edition of the Lyon Open and part of the ATP Tour 250 series of the 2022 ATP Tour. It took place in the city of Lyon, France, from 15 May through 21 May 2022. First-seeded Cameron Norrie won the singles title.

== Finals ==
=== Singles ===
- (United Kingdom) Cameron Norrie defeated (Slovakia) Alex Molčan, 6–3, 6–7^{(3–7)}, 6–1

=== Doubles ===
- (Croatia) Ivan Dodig / (United States) Austin Krajicek defeated (Argentina) Máximo González / (Brazil) Marcelo Melo, 6–3, 6–4

== Points and prize money ==
=== Point distribution ===
Event	W	F	SF	QF	Round of 16	Round of 32	Q	Q2	Q1
Singles	250	150	90	45	20	0	12	6	0
Doubles	250	150	90	45	0	—N/a	—N/a	—N/a	—N/a

=== Prize money ===
Event	W	F	SF	QF	Round of 16	Round of 32	Q2	Q1
Singles	€41,145	€29,500	€21,000	€14,000	€9,000	€5,415	€2,645	€1,375
Doubles*	€15,360	€11,000	€7,250	€4,710	€2,760	—N/a	—N/a	—N/a

_{*per team}

== Singles main draw entrants ==
=== Seeds ===
Country	Player	Rank^{1}	Seed
GBR	Cameron Norrie	11	1
ESP	Pablo Carreño Busta	18	2
~~FRA~~	~~Gaël Monfils~~	~~21~~	~~3~~
AUS	Alex de Minaur	22	4
	Karen Khachanov	24	5
	Aslan Karatsev	35	6
ARG	Sebastián Báez	37	7
ESP	Pedro Martínez	40	8

- Rankings are as of May 9, 2022.

=== Other entrants ===
The following players received wildcards into the singles main draw:

- (France) Hugo Gaston
- (France) Lucas Pouille
- (France) Jo-Wilfried Tsonga

The following player received entry using a protected ranking into the singles main draw:

- (Slovenia) Aljaž Bedene

The following players received entry from the qualifying draw:

- (France) Grégoire Barrère
- (Argentina) Tomás Martín Etcheverry
- (France) Manuel Guinard
- (France) Gilles Simon

The following players received entry as lucky losers:

- (United States) Michael Mmoh
- (Japan) Yosuke Watanuki

=== Withdrawals ===
Before the tournament

- (France) Benjamin Bonzi → replaced by (Japan) Yosuke Watanuki
- (Belgium) David Goffin → replaced by (Denmark) Holger Rune
- (France) Gaël Monfils → replaced by (United States) Michael Mmoh
- (Italy) Lorenzo Musetti → replaced by (South Korea) Kwon Soon-woo

== Doubles main draw entrants ==
=== Seeds ===
Country	Player	Country	Player	Rank^{1}	Seed
CRO	Ivan Dodig	USA	Austin Krajicek	67	1
ARG	Máximo González	BRA	Marcelo Melo	72	2
BEL	Sander Gillé	BEL	Joran Vliegen	97	3
SWE	André Göransson	JPN	Ben McLachlan	105	4

- Rankings are as of May 9, 2022.

=== Other entrants ===
The following pairs received wildcards into the doubles main draw:

- (France) Ugo Blanchet / (France) Albano Olivetti
- (France) Ugo Humbert / (France) Tristan Lamasine

The following pair received entry as alternates:

- ~~(France) Jonathan Eysseric / (France) Adrian Mannarino~~
- (United States) Max Schnur / (New Zealand) Artem Sitak

=== Withdrawals ===
- (Germany) Daniel Altmaier / (Germany) Oscar Otte
- (Argentina) Francisco Cerúndolo / (Argentina) Federico Coria → replaced by (United States) Max Schnur / (New Zealand) Artem Sitak
