= Fábián Marozsán =

Hungarian tennis player (born 1999)

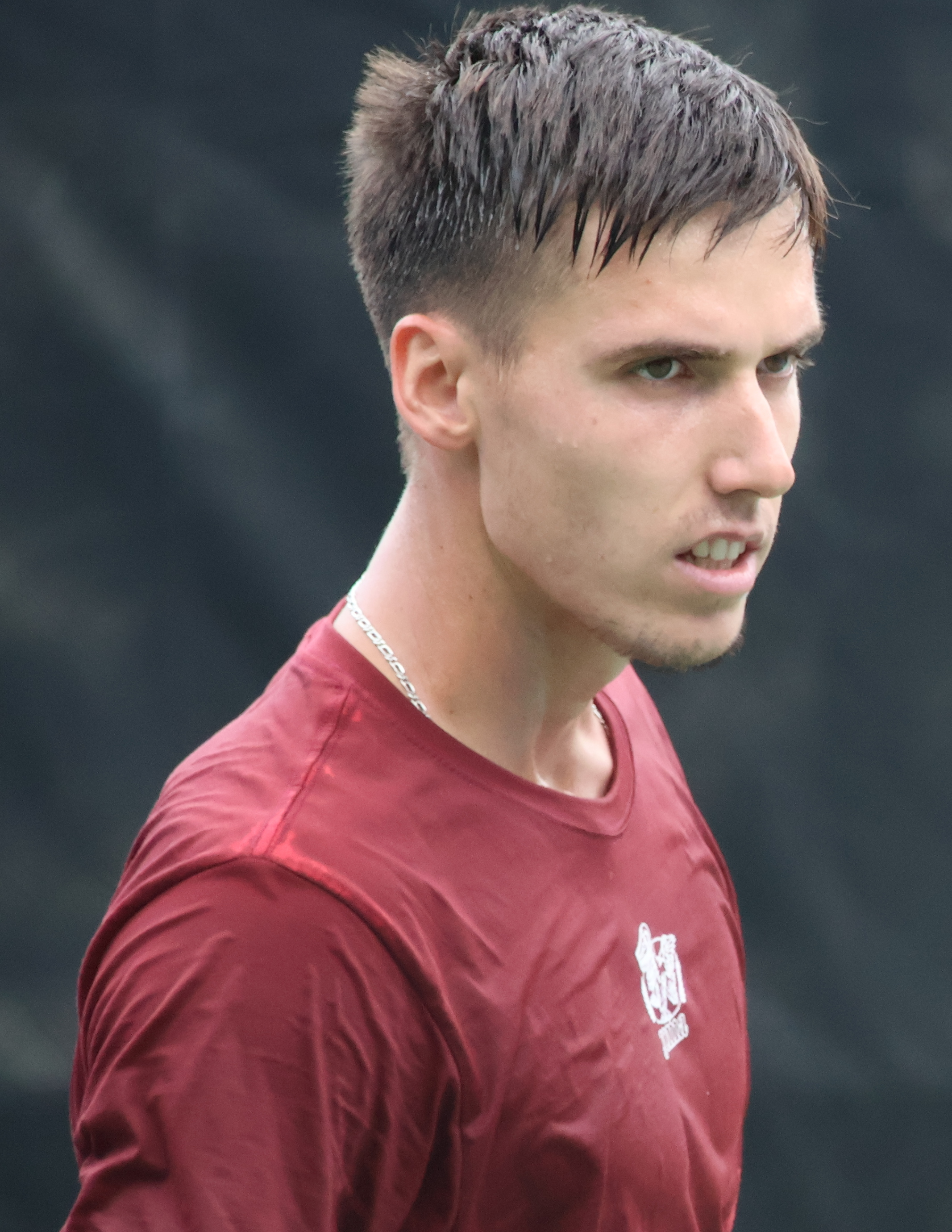
- Marozsán at the 2025 Mubadala Citi DC Open
- Country (sports): Hungary
- Residence: Érd, Hungary
- Born: 8 October 1999 (age 27) Budapest, Hungary
- Height: 1.93 m (6 ft 4 in)
- Turned pro: 2017
- Plays: Right-handed (two-handed backhand)
- Coach: György Balázs, Roman Hajdusik
- Prize money: US $5,477,828

Singles
- Career record: 84–87
- Career titles: 0
- Highest ranking: No. 36 (6 May 2024)
- Current ranking: No. 63 (9 November 2026)

Grand Slam singles results
- Australian Open: 3R (2024, 2025, 2026)
- French Open: 2R (2024, 2025)
- Wimbledon: 2R (2025, 2026)
- US Open: 2R (2023, 2024)

Other tournaments
- Olympic Games: 1R (2024)

Doubles
- Career record: 10–21
- Career titles: 0
- Highest ranking: No. 259 (9 November 2026)
- Current ranking: No. 259 (9 November 2026)

Grand Slam doubles results
- Australian Open: 2R (2024)
- French Open: 2R (2025, 2026)
- Wimbledon: 2R (2025)
- US Open: 1R (2024, 2025, 2026)

Other doubles tournaments
- Olympic Games: 1R (2024)

Team competitions
- Davis Cup: 4–5
- Last updated on: 9 November 2026.

Fábián Marozsán (born 8 October 1999) is a Hungarian professional tennis player. He has a career high ATP singles ranking of world No. 36 achieved on 6 May 2024 and a doubles ranking of No. 259 achieved on 9 November 2026. He is currently the No. 1 Hungarian player.

== Career ==
=== 2022: First Challenger title and top 200 ===
He won his first Challenger title in August 2022 in Banja Luka and reached the top 200 at world No. 185 on 29 August 2022.

=== 2023: ATP, Major, Masters debut & win over world No. 2 & quarterfinal, top 65 ===
He won his second Challenger in March 2023 in Antalya and moved to a new career high of No. 128 on 20 March 2023.

Ranked No. 135, Marozsán made his ATP and Masters 1000 debut at the 2023 Italian Open after qualifying into the main draw. He won his first Masters level match, defeating Corentin Moutet. In his second round match, he defeated 32nd seed Jiří Lehečka in a third set tiebreaker. He then upset world No. 2 Carlos Alcaraz in straight sets for the biggest win of his career and first top-5 and top-10 win, to reach the fourth round. As a result, he moved 20 positions up to world No. 115 on 22 May 2023. He lost to Borna Ćorić in three sets.

He reached the top 100 on 19 June 2023, after winning the Perugia Challenger title, defeating top seed Pedro Cachin in the semifinals and wildcard Edoardo Lavagno in the final without dropping a set en route.

He made his debut at the 2023 Wimbledon Championships as a lucky loser after the late withdrawal of Nick Kyrgios.

In his second Grand Slam main draw appearance, he reached the second round of the 2023 US Open. In his first round match, he defeated Richard Gasquet in a five sets match where he was originally leading by two sets and a break.

At the 2023 Rolex Shanghai Masters he reached again the fourth round at the Masters level in the season and only twice in his career, defeating Arthur Rinderknech, 11th seed Alex de Minaur and Dušan Lajović for his fourth, fifth and sixth wins at a Masters 1000 level all in straight sets. He became the first Hungarian to reach a quarterfinal at the Masters 1000 level since the series began in 1990 with a top-10 win over Casper Ruud. He lost to 16th seed and eventual champion Hubert Hurkacz in three sets.

He reached another quarterfinal at the 2023 Sofia Open defeating Roberto Bautista Agut coming back from a break down in the third set and converting his fourth match point, before losing to Jan-Lennard Struff.

=== 2024: Major third round, second Masters quarterfinal, top 40 ===
At the 2024 Australian Open he reached the third round with wins over Marin Čilić and 22nd seed Francisco Cerundolo. At the 2024 BNP Paribas Open he reached the fourth round of a Masters for the third time in his career defeating lucky loser Jurij Rodionov, 24th seed Nicolás Jarry and qualifier Thiago Seyboth Wild.

At the 2024 Miami Open he reached again the fourth round of a Masters, this time defeating Aleksandar Kovacevic, upsetting sixth seed Holger Rune, for his third top-10 win, dropping only two games en route in less than one hour, and Alexei Popyrin also in straight sets. He defeated another Australian and top 10 player Alex de Minaur to reach his second Masters quarterfinal. As a result, he reached the top 40 in the rankings.

=== 2025: First ATP semifinal ===
At the 2025 Australian Open Marozsan reached again the third round defeating 17th seed Frances Tiafoe, in his second fifth setter at the tournament.

At the ATP 500 2025 BMW Open in Munich, he reached his first ever ATP and also 500-level semifinal defeating Justin Engel, Ugo Humbert, Zizou Bergs before losing to eventual champion Alexander Zverev.

=== 2026: Second semifinal & consecutive Major third round ===
Marozsan reached his second ATP semifinal at the 2026 ASB Classic defeating defending champion Gael Monfils, second seed Casper Ruud and qualifier Eliot Spizzirri.

He reached the third round of the Australian Open for a third time in consecutive seasons, defeating Kamil Majchrzak.

== Performance timeline ==
Key
W	F	SF	QF	#R	RR	Q#	P#	DNQ	A	Z#	PO	G	S	B	NMS	NTI	P	NH

(W) winner; (F) finalist; (SF) semifinalist; (QF) quarterfinalist; (#R) rounds 4, 3, 2, 1; (RR) round-robin stage; (Q#) qualification round; (P#) preliminary round; (DNQ) did not qualify; (A) absent; (Z#) Davis/Fed Cup Zonal Group (with number indication) or (PO) play-off; (G) gold, (S) silver or (B) bronze Olympic/Paralympic medal; (NMS) not a Masters tournament; (NTI) not a Tier I tournament; (P) postponed; (NH) not held; (SR) strike rate (events won / competed); (W–L) win–loss record.
To avoid confusion and double counting, these charts are updated at the conclusion of a tournament or when the player's participation has ended.

Tournament	2021	2022	2023	2024	2025	2026	SR	W–L	Win %
Grand Slam tournaments
Australian Open	A	A	Q1	3R	3R	3R	0 / 3	6–3	67%
French Open	A	A	Q2	2R	2R	1R	0 / 3	2–3	40%
Wimbledon	A	A	1R	1R	2R	2R	0 / 4	2–4	33%
US Open	A	A	2R	2R	1R	1R	0 / 4	2–4	33%
Win–Loss	0–0	0–0	1–2	4–4	4–4	3–4	0 / 14	12–14	46%
National representation
Davis Cup	RR	WG1	WG1	WG1	2R	WG1	0 / 6	3–6	33%
ATP Tour Masters 1000
Indian Wells	A	A	A	4R	2R	1R	0 / 3	4–3	57%
Miami Open	A	A	A	QF	1R	1R	0 / 3	4–3	57%
Monte-Carlo Masters	A	A	A	A	1R	2R	0 / 2	1–2	33%
Madrid Open	A	A	A	2R	1R	2R	0 / 3	2–3	40%
Italian Open	A	A	4R	1R	3R	1R	0 / 4	5–4	56%
Canadian Open	A	A	A	1R	3R	2R	0 / 3	3–3	50%
Cincinnati Masters	A	A	A	3R	2R	1R	0 / 3	3–3	50%
Shanghai Masters	A	A	QF	A	2R	1R	0 / 3	5–3	63%
Paris Masters	A	A	A	Q1	1R		0 / 1	0–1	0%
Win–Loss	0–0	0–0	7–2	10–6	7–9	3–8	0 / 25	27–25	52%
Career statistics
Tournaments	0	0	7	28	24	12	71		
Overall Win–Loss	0–1	0–0	12–8	23–28	26–26	11–13	0 / 71	72–76	49%
Year-end ranking	371	173	64	58	51		$4,417,325		

== ATP Challenger and ITF Tour finals ==
=== Singles: 15 (8-7) ===
Legend (singles) ATP Challenger Tour (3–1) World Tennis Tour (WTT) (5–6)	Finals by surface Hard (2–1) Clay (6–6)

Result	W–L	Date	Tournament	Tier	Surface	Opponent	Score
Win	1–0	Aug 2022	Banja Luka Challenger, Bosnia and Herzegovina	Challenger	Clay	(Bosnia and Herzegovina) Damir Džumhur	6–2, 6–1
Loss	1–1	Nov 2022	Slovak Open, Slovakia	Challenger	Hard (i)	(Hungary) Márton Fucsovics	2–6, 4–6
Win	2–1	Mar 2023	Antalya Challenger, Turkey	Challenger	Clay	(Austria) Sebastian Ofner	7–5, 6–0
Win	3–1	Jun 2023	Perugia International, Italy	Challenger	Clay	(Italy) Edoardo Lavagno	6–2, 6–3
Loss	0–1	Jul 2019	M15 Belgrade, Serbia	WTT	Clay	(Serbia) Marko Miladinović	3–6, 3–6
Loss	0–2	Jul 2019	M15 Piešťany, Slovakia	WTT	Clay	(Slovakia) Lukáš Klein	1–6, 6–4, 1–6
Loss	0–3	Oct 2019	M15 Antalya, Turkey	WTT	Clay	(Hungary) Máté Valkusz	2–6, 5–7
Loss	0–4	Oct 2019	M15 Antalya, Turkey	WTT	Clay	(Italy) Lorenzo Musetti	5–7, 2–6
Win	1–4	Dec 2019	M15 Antalya, Turkey	WTT	Clay	(Russia) Ronald Slobodchikov	7–5, 6–4
Win	2–4	Mar 2021	M15 Bratislava, Slovakia	WTT	Hard	(France) Jonathan Eysseric	6–2, 3–0 ret.
Loss	2–5	Apr 2021	M15 Antalya, Turkey	WTT	Clay	(Belgium) Christopher Heyman	2–6, 6–4, 2–6
Loss	2–6	Aug 2021	M15 Bratislava, Slovakia	WTT	Clay	(Hungary) Máté Valkusz	6–3, 1–6, 4–5 ret.
Win	3–6	Sep 2021	M15 Žilina, Slovakia	WTT	Clay	(Chile) Bastián Malla	1–6, 6–3, 6–1
Win	4–6	Sep 2021	M15 Zlatibor, Slovakia	WTT	Clay	(Serbia) Marko Tepavac	6–4, 2–1 ret.
Win	5–6	Mar 2022	M25 Loulé, Portugal	WTT	Hard	(Austria) Lucas Miedler	6–7^{(6–8)}, 6–1, 6–3

=== Doubles: 11 (6-5) ===
Legend (doubles) ATP Challenger Tour (0–0) Futures/ITF World Tennis Tour (6–5)	Finals by surface Hard (0–1) Clay (6–4)

Result	W–L	Date	Tournament	Tier	Surface	Partner	Opponents	Score
Loss	0–1	Jul 2018	Slovakia F1; Trnava	Futures	Clay	(United States) Matthew Kandath	(Czech Republic) Petr Michnev (Czech Republic) Tadeas Paroulek	6–7^{(1–7)}, 7–6^{(10–8)}, [7–10]
Loss	0–2	Sep 2018	Serbia F5; Zlatibor	Futures	Clay	(Slovakia) Martin Fekiač	(Brazil) Caio Silva (Brazil) Thales Turini	4–6, 2–6
Win	1–2	May 2019	M15 Piešťany; Slovakia	WTT	Clay	(Hungary) Péter Nagy	(Switzerland) Raphael Baltensperger (Russia) Matvey Khomentovskiy	7–6^{(7–2)}, 6–0
Win	2–2	Jun 2019	M25 Gyula; Hungary	WTT	Clay	(Hungary) Gábor Borsos	(Russia) Alexander Igoshin (Russia) Evgenii Tiurnev	7–6^{(9–7)}, 2–6, [12–10]
Win	3–2	Oct 2019	M15 Antalya; Turkey	WTT	Clay	(Hungary) Máté Valkusz	(Russia) Vladimir Korolev (Russia) Ronald Slobodchikov	7–5, 6–2
Win	4–2	Nov 2019	M15 Antalya; Turkey	WTT	Clay	(Hungary) Péter Fajta	(Italy) Stefano Battaglino (Italy) Riccardo Bonadio	7–6^{(7–5)}, 3–6, [14–12]
Win	5–2	Dec 2019	M15 Antalya; Turkey	WTT	Clay	(Hungary) Máté Valkusz	(Spain) David Jordà Sanchis (Germany) Niklas Schell	6–3, 7–5
Loss	5–3	Feb 2020	M15 Antalya; Turkey	WTT	Clay	(Hungary) Péter Nagy	(Romania) Călin Manda (Ukraine) Oleg Prihodko	6–2, 6–7^{(3–7)}, [8–10]
Loss	5–4	Feb 2020	M15 Antalya; Turkey	WTT	Clay	(Hungary) Péter Nagy	(Czech Republic) Jonáš Forejtek (Czech Republic) Michael Vrbenský	3–6, 4–6
Win	6–4	Apr 2021	M15 Antalya; Turkey	WTT	Clay	(Hungary) Péter Fajta	(Italy) Emiliano Maggioli (Ukraine) Oleksandr Ovcharenko	7–5, 7–6^{(7–3)}
Loss	6–5	Jan 2022	M25 Vilnius; Lithuania	WTT	Hard (i)	(Hungary) Péter Fajta	(Belarus) Ivan Liutarevich (Kazakhstan) Denis Yevseyev	4–6, 6–7^{(4–7)}

== Best Grand Slam results details ==
	Australian Open			
2024 Australian Open
Round	Opponent	Rank	Score	FMR
1R	(Croatia) Marin Čilić (PR)	N/R	6–1, 2–6, 6–2, 7–5	No. 67
2R	(Argentina) Francisco Cerúndolo (22)	No. 21	7–6^{(7–5)}, 6–4, 6–2	No. 67
3R	(United States) Taylor Fritz (12)	No. 12	6–3, 4–6, 2–6, 2–6	No. 67
2025 Australian Open
Round	Opponent	Rank	Score	FMR
1R	(Brazil) Thiago Seyboth Wild	No. 79	6–3, 6–7^{(5–7)}, 7–5, 5–7, 7–5	No. 59
2R	(United States) Frances Tiafoe (17)	No. 16	6–7^{(3–7)}, 6–4, 3–6, 6–4, 6–1	No. 59
3R	(Italy) Lorenzo Sonego	No. 55	7–6^{(7–3)}, 6–7^{(6–8)}, 1–6, 2–6	No. 59
2026 Australian Open
Round	Opponent	Rank	Score	FMR
1R	(France) Arthur Rinderknech (24)	No. 28	6–3, 6–4, 6–7^{(2–7)}, 6–4	No. 47
2R	(Poland) Kamil Majchrzak	No. 59	6–3, 6–4, 7–6^{(7–5)}	No. 47
3R	Daniil Medvedev (11)	No. 12	7–6^{(7–5)}, 6–4, 5–7, 0–6, 3–6	No. 47

	French Open			
2024 French Open
Round	Opponent	Rank	Score	FMR
1R	(Kazakhstan) Mikhail Kukushkin (Q)	No. 136	6–2, 6–2, 6–3	No. 43
2R	(Bulgaria) Grigor Dimitrov (10)	No. 10	0–6, 3–6, 4–6	No. 43
2025 French Open
Round	Opponent	Rank	Score	FMR
1R	(Italy) Luca Nardi	No. 95	6–2, 6–3, 7–6^{(7–3)}	No. 56
2R	(Spain) Carlos Alcaraz (2)	No. 2	1–6, 6–4, 1–6, 2–6	No. 56

	Wimbledon Championships			
2025 Wimbledon
Round	Opponent	Rank	Score	FMR
1R	(Australia) James McCabe (Q)	No. 181	6–1, 6–4, 6–3	No. 58
2R	(Spain) Jaume Munar	No. 55	2–6, 3–6, 6–7^{(9–11)}	No. 58
2026 Wimbledon
Round	Opponent	Rank	Score	FMR
1R	(Argentina) Thiago Agustín Tirante	No. 55	7–5, 6–3, 6–4	No. 53
2R	(Spain) Alejandro Davidovich Fokina (22)	No. 23	3–6, 0–6, 3–6	No. 53

	US Open			
2023 US Open
Round	Opponent	Rank	Score	FMR
1R	(France) Richard Gasquet	No. 55	6–3, 6–1, 6–7^{(5–7)}, 6–7^{(1–7)}, 6–2	No. 92
2R	(France) Adrian Mannarino (22)	No. 35	6–3, 3–6, 4–6, 1–6	No. 92
2024 US Open
Round	Opponent	Rank	Score	FMR
1R	(Serbia) Hamad Medjedovic (Q)	No. 137	2–6, 6–1, 3–6, 6–1, 6–4	No. 51
2R	Daniil Medvedev (5)	No. 5	3–6, 2–6, 6–7^{(5–7)}	No. 51

== Wins against top 10 players ==
- Marozsán has a 6–11 (35.29%) win-loss record against players who were, at the time the match was played, ranked in the top 10.

Season	2023	2024	2025	Total
Wins	2	3	1	6

#	Player	Rk	Event	Surface	Rd	Score	Rk
2023
1.	(Spain) Carlos Alcaraz	2	Italian Open, Italy	Clay	3R	6–3, 7–6^{(7–4)}	135
2.	(Norway) Casper Ruud	9	Shanghai Masters, China	Hard	4R	7–6^{(7–3)}, 3–6, 6–4	91
2024
3.	(Denmark) Holger Rune	7	Miami Open, United States	Hard	2R	6–1, 6–1	57
4.	(Australia) Alex de Minaur	10	Miami Open, United States	Hard	4R	6–4, 0–6, 6–1	57
5.	(Bulgaria) Grigor Dimitrov	9	Cincinnati Open, United States	Hard	2R	4–6, 6–4, 6–3	50
2025
6.	Andrey Rublev	8	Hong Kong Open, China SAR	Hard	2R	7–5, 3–6, 6–3	58

*As of 24 October 2025

== National representation ==
=== Davis Cup ===
Marozsán represents Hungary at the Davis Cup, where he has a W/L record of 4–5.

Group membership Finals (0–3) Qualifying round (2–1) World Group I (2–1)	Matches by surface Hard (2–5) Clay (2–0) Grass (0–0)	Matches by type Singles (1–2) Doubles (3–3)

- ▲ ▼ indicates the outcome of the Davis Cup match followed by the score, date, place of event, the zonal classification and its phase, and the court surface.

Result	No.	Rubber	Match type (partner if any)	Opponent nation	Opponent player(s)	Score
▼1–2; 27 November 2021; Pala Alpitour, Turin, Italy; Davis Cup Finals Group D round robin; hard (indoor) surface
Loss	1	III	Doubles (with Zsombor Piros)	Australia	Alex Bolt / John Peers	3–6, 7–6^{(13–11)}, 3–6
▼1–2; 28 November 2021; Pala Alpitour, Turin, Italy; Davis Cup Finals Group D round robin; hard (indoor) surface
Loss	2	I	Singles	Croatia	Nino Serdarušić	4–6, 4–6
Loss	3	III	Doubles (with Péter Nagy)	Croatia	Nikola Mektić / Mate Pavić	6–7^{(6–8)}, 2–6
▼2–3; 4–5 March 2022; Ken Rosewall Arena, Sydney, Australia; Davis Cup qualifying round; hard surface
Win	4	II	Doubles (with Máté Valkusz)	Australia	John Peers / Luke Saville	6–4, 6–4
▲3–1; 15–16 September 2022; SEB Arena, Vilnius, Lithuania; World Group I first round; hard (indoor) surface
Loss	5	III	Doubles (with Péter Fajta)	Ukraine	Illya Beloborodko / Vladyslav Manafov	6–7^{(4–7)}, 4–6
▼2–3; 3–4 February 2023; Multifunctional Arena, Tatabánya, Hungary; Davis Cup qualifying round; hard (indoor) surface
Win	6	III	Doubles (with Máté Valkusz)	France	Nicolas Mahut / Arthur Rinderknech	6–2, 7–6^{(7–4)}
Loss	7	V	Singles	France	Ugo Humbert	3–6, 3–6
▲3–0; 15–16 September 2023; Helikon Teniszcentrum, Keszthely, Hungary; World Group I first round; clay surface
Win	8	I	Singles	Turkey	Altuğ Çelikbilek	7–5, 6–2
Win	9	III	Doubles (with Máté Valkusz)	Turkey	Altuğ Çelikbilek / Cem İlkel	6–3, 6–3
