= Michele Ribecai =

Italian tennis player (born 2003)

- Country (sports): Italy
- Born: 4 February 2003 (age 23) Lucca, Italy
- Height: 1.73 m (5 ft 8 in)
- Plays: Right-handed (two-handed backhand)
- Prize money: US $111,876

Singles
- Career record: 0–0 (at ATP Tour level, Grand Slam level, and in Davis Cup)
- Career titles: 1 ATP Challenger, 2 ITF
- Highest ranking: No. 232 (16 November 2026)
- Current ranking: No. 232 (16 November 2026)

Doubles
- Career record: 0–0 (at ATP Tour level, Grand Slam level, and in Davis Cup)
- Career titles: 0
- Highest ranking: No. 808 (26 October 2026)
- Current ranking: No. 812 (16 November 2026)
- Last updated on: 16 November 2026.

Michele Ribecai (born 4 February 2003) is an Italian professional tennis player. He has a career high ATP singles ranking of No. 232 achieved on 16 November 2026 and a career high ATP doubles ranking of No. 808 achieved on 26 October 2026.

Ribecai has won one ATP Challenger singles title at the 2026 Crete Challenger III.
