= ATP Awards =

Tennis award

This is a list of all the awards given by the Association of Tennis Professionals (ATP) to players and others of particular distinction during a given season. Rafael Nadal is the only man to win every ATP award in the player category.

== Player and Team of the Year ==
Since 2000, the ATP Player and Team of the Year awards are given to the player and team who end the year as world No. 1 in the ATP rankings. In earlier years, this was not explicitly the case, as in 1975, 1976, 1977, 1978, 1982 and 1989, the Players of the Year named by the ATP (listed below) did not hold the No. 1 ranking based on the ATP's point system at the end of that particular year. In those years, the No. 1 ranking was held by Jimmy Connors (1975–78), John McEnroe (1982) and Ivan Lendl (1989). The most successful players in this category are Novak Djokovic in singles, and the Bryan brothers in doubles.

Year	Player of the Year
1975	(United States) Arthur Ashe
1976	(Sweden) Björn Borg
1977	(Sweden) Björn Borg (2)
1978	(Sweden) Björn Borg (3)
1979	(Sweden) Björn Borg (4)
1980	(Sweden) Björn Borg (5)
1981	(United States) John McEnroe
1982	(United States) Jimmy Connors
1983	(United States) John McEnroe (2)
1984	(United States) John McEnroe (3)
1985	(Czechoslovakia) Ivan Lendl
1986	(Czechoslovakia) Ivan Lendl (2)
1987	(Czechoslovakia) Ivan Lendl (3)
1988	(Sweden) Mats Wilander
1989	(West Germany) Boris Becker
1990	(Sweden) Stefan Edberg
1991	(Sweden) Stefan Edberg (2)
1992	(United States) Jim Courier
1993	(United States) Pete Sampras
1994	(United States) Pete Sampras (2)
1995	(United States) Pete Sampras (3)
1996	(United States) Pete Sampras (4)
1997	(United States) Pete Sampras (5)
1998	(United States) Pete Sampras (6)
1999	(United States) Andre Agassi
2000	(Brazil) Gustavo Kuerten
2001	(Australia) Lleyton Hewitt
2002	(Australia) Lleyton Hewitt (2)
2003	(United States) Andy Roddick
2004	(Switzerland) Roger Federer
2005	(Switzerland) Roger Federer (2)
2006	(Switzerland) Roger Federer (3)
2007	(Switzerland) Roger Federer (4)
2008	(Spain) Rafael Nadal
2009	(Switzerland) Roger Federer (5)
2010	(Spain) Rafael Nadal (2)
2011	(Serbia) Novak Djokovic
2012	(Serbia) Novak Djokovic (2)
2013	(Spain) Rafael Nadal (3)
2014	(Serbia) Novak Djokovic (3)
2015	(Serbia) Novak Djokovic (4)
2016	(United Kingdom) Andy Murray
2017	(Spain) Rafael Nadal (4)
2018	(Serbia) Novak Djokovic (5)
2019	(Spain) Rafael Nadal (5)
2020	(Serbia) Novak Djokovic (6)
2021	(Serbia) Novak Djokovic (7)
2022	(Spain) Carlos Alcaraz
2023	(Serbia) Novak Djokovic (8)
2024	(Italy) Jannik Sinner
2025	(Spain) Carlos Alcaraz (2)

Year	Team of the year
1975	(United States) Brian Gottfried & (Mexico) Raúl Ramírez
1976	(United States) Brian Gottfried (2) & (Mexico) Raúl Ramírez (2)
1977	(South Africa) Bob Hewitt & (South Africa) Frew McMillan
1978	(South Africa) Bob Hewitt (2) & (South Africa) Frew McMillan (2)
1979	(United States) Peter Fleming & (United States) John McEnroe
1980	(United States) Bob Lutz & (United States) Stan Smith
1981	(United States) Peter Fleming (2) & (United States) John McEnroe (2)
1982	(United States) Sherwood Stewart & (United States) Ferdi Taygan
1983	(United States) Peter Fleming (3) & (United States) John McEnroe (3)
1984	(United States) Peter Fleming (4) & (United States) John McEnroe (4)
1985	(United States) Ken Flach & (United States) Robert Seguso
1986	(Chile) Hans Gildemeister & (Ecuador) Andrés Gómez
1987	(Sweden) Stefan Edberg & (Sweden) Anders Järryd
1988	(United States) Rick Leach & (United States) Jim Pugh
1989	(United States) Rick Leach (2) & (United States) Jim Pugh (2)
1990	(South Africa) Pieter Aldrich & (South Africa) Danie Visser
1991	(Australia) John Fitzgerald & (Sweden) Anders Järryd (2)
1992	(Australia) Todd Woodbridge & (Australia) Mark Woodforde (team article)
1993	(Canada) Grant Connell & (United States) Patrick Galbraith
1994	(Netherlands) Jacco Eltingh & (Netherlands) Paul Haarhuis
1995	(Australia) Todd Woodbridge (2) & (Australia) Mark Woodforde (2)
1996	(Australia) Todd Woodbridge (3) & (Australia) Mark Woodforde (3)
1997	(Australia) Todd Woodbridge (4) & (Australia) Mark Woodforde (4)
1998	(Netherlands) Jacco Eltingh (2) & (Netherlands) Paul Haarhuis (2)
1999	(India) Leander Paes & (India) Mahesh Bhupathi
2000	(Australia) Todd Woodbridge (5) & (Australia) Mark Woodforde (5)
2001	(Sweden) Jonas Björkman & (Australia) Todd Woodbridge (6)
2002	(The Bahamas) Mark Knowles & (Canada) Daniel Nestor
2003	(United States) Bob Bryan & (United States) Mike Bryan (team article)
2004	(The Bahamas) Mark Knowles (2) & (Canada) Daniel Nestor (2)
2005	(United States) Bob Bryan (2) & (United States) Mike Bryan (2)
2006	(United States) Bob Bryan (3) & (United States) Mike Bryan (3)
2007	(United States) Bob Bryan (4) & (United States) Mike Bryan (4)
2008	(Serbia) Nenad Zimonjić & (Canada) Daniel Nestor (3)
2009	(United States) Bob Bryan (5) & (United States) Mike Bryan (5)
2010	(United States) Bob Bryan (6) & (United States) Mike Bryan (6)
2011	(United States) Bob Bryan (7) & (United States) Mike Bryan (7)
2012	(United States) Bob Bryan (8) & (United States) Mike Bryan (8)
2013	(United States) Bob Bryan (9) & (United States) Mike Bryan (9)
2014	(United States) Bob Bryan (10) & (United States) Mike Bryan (10)
2015	(Netherlands) Jean-Julien Rojer & (Romania) Horia Tecău
2016	(United Kingdom) Jamie Murray & (Brazil) Bruno Soares
2017	(Poland) Łukasz Kubot & (Brazil) Marcelo Melo
2018	(Austria) Oliver Marach & (Croatia) Mate Pavić
2019	(Colombia) Juan Sebastián Cabal & (Colombia) Robert Farah
2020	(Croatia) Mate Pavić (2) & (Brazil) Bruno Soares (2)
2021	(Croatia) Nikola Mektić & (Croatia) Mate Pavić (3)
2022	(Netherlands) Wesley Koolhof & (United Kingdom) Neal Skupski
2023	(Croatia) Ivan Dodig & (United States) Austin Krajicek
2024	(El Salvador) Marcelo Arevalo & (Croatia) Mate Pavić (4)
2025	(United Kingdom) Julian Cash & (United Kingdom) Lloyd Glasspool

== Coach of the Year ==
The ATP Coach of the Year award goes to the ATP coach who helped guide his players to a higher level of performance during the year. It is nominated and voted by fellow ATP coaches.

Year	Coach of the Year	Coached player	Rest of nominees	Coached players
2016	(Sweden) Magnus Norman	(Switzerland) Stan Wawrinka	(Austria) Günter Bresnik	(Austria) Dominic Thiem
2016	(Sweden) Magnus Norman	(Switzerland) Stan Wawrinka	(United States) Ivan Lendl	(United Kingdom) Andy Murray
2016	(Sweden) Magnus Norman	(Switzerland) Stan Wawrinka	(France) Emmanuel Planque	(France) Lucas Pouille
2016	(Sweden) Magnus Norman	(Switzerland) Stan Wawrinka	(Sweden) Mikael Tillström	(France) Gaël Monfils
2017	(South Africa) Neville Godwin	(South Africa) Kevin Anderson	(Canada) Martin Laurendeau	(Canada) Denis Shapovalov
2017	(South Africa) Neville Godwin	(South Africa) Kevin Anderson	(Croatia) Ivan Ljubičić	(Switzerland) Roger Federer
2017	(South Africa) Neville Godwin	(South Africa) Kevin Anderson	(Spain) Carlos Moyá (Spain) Toni Nadal	(Spain) Rafael Nadal
2017	(South Africa) Neville Godwin	(South Africa) Kevin Anderson	(Russia) Alexander Zverev Sr.	(Germany) Alexander Zverev (Germany) Mischa Zverev
2018	(Slovakia) Marián Vajda	(Serbia) Novak Djokovic	(Germany) Jan de Witt	(Georgia (country)) Nikoloz Basilashvili
2018	(Slovakia) Marián Vajda	(Serbia) Novak Djokovic	(Spain) Carlos Moyá	(Spain) Rafael Nadal
2018	(Slovakia) Marián Vajda	(Serbia) Novak Djokovic	(Argentina) Sebastián Prieto	(Argentina) Juan Martín del Potro
2018	(Slovakia) Marián Vajda	(Serbia) Novak Djokovic	(Italy) Simone Vagnozzi	(Italy) Marco Cecchinato
2019	(France) Gilles Cervara	(Russia) Daniil Medvedev	(Chile) Nicolás Massú	(Austria) Dominic Thiem
2019	(France) Gilles Cervara	(Russia) Daniil Medvedev	(Spain) Carlos Moyá	(Spain) Rafael Nadal
2019	(France) Gilles Cervara	(Russia) Daniil Medvedev	(Italy) Vincenzo Santopadre	(Italy) Matteo Berrettini
2019	(France) Gilles Cervara	(Russia) Daniil Medvedev	(Greece) Apostolos Tsitsipas	(Greece) Stefanos Tsitsipas
2020	(Spain) Fernando Vicente	(Russia) Andrey Rublev	(France) Gilles Cervara	(Russia) Daniil Medvedev
2020	(Spain) Fernando Vicente	(Russia) Andrey Rublev	(Argentina) Juan Ignacio Chela	(Argentina) Diego Schwartzman
2020	(Spain) Fernando Vicente	(Russia) Andrey Rublev	(Chile) Nicolás Massú	(Austria) Dominic Thiem
2020	(Spain) Fernando Vicente	(Russia) Andrey Rublev	(Italy) Riccardo Piatti	(Italy) Jannik Sinner
2021	(Argentina) Facundo Lugones	(United Kingdom) Cameron Norrie	(United States) Craig Boynton	(Poland) Hubert Hurkacz
2021	(Argentina) Facundo Lugones	(United Kingdom) Cameron Norrie	(France) Gilles Cervara	(Russia) Daniil Medvedev
2021	(Argentina) Facundo Lugones	(United Kingdom) Cameron Norrie	(Spain) Juan Carlos Ferrero	(Spain) Carlos Alcaraz
2021	(Argentina) Facundo Lugones	(United Kingdom) Cameron Norrie	(Norway) Christian Ruud	(Norway) Casper Ruud
2022	(Spain) Juan Carlos Ferrero	(Spain) Carlos Alcaraz	(France) Frédéric Fontang	(Canada) Félix Auger-Aliassime
2022	(Spain) Juan Carlos Ferrero	(Spain) Carlos Alcaraz	(Croatia) Goran Ivanišević	(Serbia) Novak Djokovic
2022	(Spain) Juan Carlos Ferrero	(Spain) Carlos Alcaraz	(United States) Michael Russell	(United States) Taylor Fritz
2022	(Spain) Juan Carlos Ferrero	(Spain) Carlos Alcaraz	(Norway) Christian Ruud	(Norway) Casper Ruud
2023	(Australia) Darren Cahill (Italy) Simone Vagnozzi	(Italy) Jannik Sinner	(United States) Craig Boynton	(Poland) Hubert Hurkacz
2023	(Australia) Darren Cahill (Italy) Simone Vagnozzi	(Italy) Jannik Sinner	(Spain) Juan Carlos Ferrero	(Spain) Carlos Alcaraz
2023	(Australia) Darren Cahill (Italy) Simone Vagnozzi	(Italy) Jannik Sinner	(Croatia) Goran Ivanišević	(Serbia) Novak Djokovic
2023	(Australia) Darren Cahill (Italy) Simone Vagnozzi	(Italy) Jannik Sinner	(United States) Bryan Shelton	(United States) Ben Shelton
2024	(United States) Michael Russell	(United States) Taylor Fritz	(Belgium) Xavier Malisse	(Australia) Alexei Popyrin
2024	(United States) Michael Russell	(United States) Taylor Fritz	(France) Emmanuel Planque	(France) Giovanni Mpetshi Perricard
2024	(United States) Michael Russell	(United States) Taylor Fritz	(United States) Brad Stine	(United States) Tommy Paul
2024	(United States) Michael Russell	(United States) Taylor Fritz	(United Kingdom) James Trotman	(United Kingdom) Jack Draper
2025	(Spain) Juan Carlos Ferrero (Spain) Samuel López	(Spain) Carlos Alcaraz	(Monaco) Benjamin Balleret	(Monaco) Valentin Vacherot
2025	(Spain) Juan Carlos Ferrero (Spain) Samuel López	(Spain) Carlos Alcaraz	(Australia) Darren Cahill (Italy) Simone Vagnozzi	(Italy) Jannik Sinner
2025	(Spain) Juan Carlos Ferrero (Spain) Samuel López	(Spain) Carlos Alcaraz	(France) Frédéric Fontang	(Canada) Félix Auger-Aliassime
2025	(Spain) Juan Carlos Ferrero (Spain) Samuel López	(Spain) Carlos Alcaraz	(United States) Bryan Shelton	(United States) Ben Shelton

=== Tim Gullikson Career Coach Award ===
The Tim Gullikson Career Coach award showcases someone who has inspired generations of young players and fellow coaches to grow the sport of tennis. It is voted on by fellow ATP coaches.

Year	Coach
2019	(Australia) Tony Roche
2020	(Australia) Bob Brett
2021	Not given
2022	Not given
2023	(Spain) José Higueras
2024	Not given

== Most Improved Player, Comeback Player & Newcomer of the Year ==
Most Improved Player award - The nominees for this award are determined by an International Tennis Writers' Association (ITWA) vote; ATP players then vote for a winner from the list of nominees. The award goes to the player who reached a significantly higher ATP ranking by year’s end and who demonstrated an increasingly improved level of performance through the year.

Newcomer of the Year award - This award is voted by the ATP players from the nominees. It goes to the Next Generation player (player aged 21-and-under) who entered the Top 100 for the first time and made the biggest impact on the ATP Tour during the season.

Comeback Player of the Year award - The nominees for this award are determined by an International Tennis Writers' Association (ITWA) vote; ATP players then vote for a winner from the list of nominees. It goes to the player who has overcome serious injury in re-establishing himself as one of the top players on the ATP Tour.

Most Improved Player
1973	(India) Vijay Amritraj
1974	(Argentina) Guillermo Vilas
1975	(United States) Vitas Gerulaitis
1976	(Poland) Wojciech Fibak
1977	(United States) Brian Gottfried
1978	(United States) John McEnroe
1979	(Paraguay) Víctor Pecci
1980	not attributed
1981	(Czechoslovakia) Ivan Lendl
1982	(Australia) Peter McNamara
1983	(United States) Jimmy Arias
1984	not attributed
1985	(West Germany) Boris Becker
1986	(Sweden) Mikael Pernfors
1987	(Sweden) Peter Lundgren
1988	(United States) Andre Agassi
1989	(United States) Michael Chang
1990	(United States) Pete Sampras
1991	(United States) Jim Courier
1992	(Sweden) Henrik Holm
1993	(United States) Todd Martin
1994	(Russia) Yevgeny Kafelnikov
1995	(Sweden) Thomas Enqvist
1996	(United Kingdom) Tim Henman
1997	(Australia) Patrick Rafter
1998	(United States) Andre Agassi (2)
1999	(Ecuador) Nicolás Lapentti
2000	(Russia) Marat Safin
2001	(Croatia) Goran Ivanišević
2002	(Thailand) Paradorn Srichaphan
2003	(Germany) Rainer Schüttler
2004	(Sweden) Joachim Johansson
2005	(Spain) Rafael Nadal
2006	(Serbia) Novak Djokovic
2007	(Serbia) Novak Djokovic (2)
2008	(France) Jo-Wilfried Tsonga
2009	(United States) John Isner
2010	(Kazakhstan) Andrey Golubev
2011	(United States) Alex Bogomolov Jr.
2012	(Australia) Marinko Matosevic
2013	(Spain) Pablo Carreño Busta
2014	(Spain) Roberto Bautista Agut
2015	(South Korea) Hyeon Chung
2016	(France) Lucas Pouille
2017	(Canada) Denis Shapovalov
2018	(Greece) Stefanos Tsitsipas
2019	(Italy) Matteo Berrettini
2020	(Russia) Andrey Rublev
2021	(Russia) Aslan Karatsev
2022	(Spain) Carlos Alcaraz
2023	(Italy) Jannik Sinner
2024	(France) Giovanni Mpetshi Perricard

Newcomer of the Year
1973	not attributed
1974	not attributed
1975	(United States) Vitas Gerulaitis
1976	(Poland) Wojciech Fibak
1977	(United States) Tim Gullikson
1978	(United States) John McEnroe
1979	(United States) Vincent Van Patten
1980	(United States) Mel Purcell
1981	(United States) Tim Mayotte
1982	(United States) Chip Hooper
1983	(United States) Scott Davis
1984	(United States) Bob Green
1985	(Peru) Jaime Yzaga
1986	(Sweden) Ulf Stenlund
1987	(United States) Richey Reneberg
1988	(United States) Michael Chang
1989	(Spain) Sergi Bruguera
1990	(France) Fabrice Santoro
1991	(Zimbabwe) Byron Black
1992	(Ukraine) Andriy Medvedev
1993	(Australia) Patrick Rafter
1994	(Spain) Albert Costa
1995	(Australia) Mark Philippoussis
1996	(Slovakia) Dominik Hrbatý
1997	(Spain) Julián Alonso
1998	(Russia) Marat Safin
1999	(Spain) Juan Carlos Ferrero
2000	(Belgium) Olivier Rochus
2001	(United States) Andy Roddick
2002	(France) Paul-Henri Mathieu
2003	(Spain) Rafael Nadal
2004	(Germany) Florian Mayer
2005	(France) Gaël Monfils
2006	(Germany) Benjamin Becker
2007	(France) Jo-Wilfried Tsonga
2008	(Japan) Kei Nishikori
2009	(Argentina) Horacio Zeballos
2010	(Germany) Tobias Kamke
2011	(Canada) Milos Raonic
2012	(Slovakia) Martin Kližan
2013	(Czech Republic) Jiří Veselý*
2014	(Croatia) Borna Ćorić*
2015	(Germany) Alexander Zverev*
2016	(United States) Taylor Fritz*
2017	(Canada) Denis Shapovalov*
2018	(Australia) Alex de Minaur
2019	(Italy) Jannik Sinner
2020	(Spain) Carlos Alcaraz
2021	(United States) Jenson Brooksby
2022	(Denmark) Holger Rune
2023	(France) Arthur Fils
2024	(Czech Republic) Jakub Menšík

Comeback player of the Year
1973	not attributed
1974	not attributed
1975	not attributed
1976	not attributed
1977	not attributed
1978	not attributed
1979	(United States) Arthur Ashe
1980	not attributed
1981	(United States) Bob Lutz
1982	(United States) Jeff Borowiak
1983	(United States) Butch Walts
1984	not attributed
1985	not attributed
1986	not attributed
1987	not attributed
1988	not attributed
1989	(Socialist Federal Republic of Yugoslavia) Goran Prpić
1990	(Austria) Thomas Muster
1991	(United States) Jimmy Connors
1992	(France) Henri Leconte
1993	(Sweden) Mikael Pernfors
1994	(France) Guy Forget
1995	(United States) Derrick Rostagno
1996	(France) Stéphane Simian
1997	(Spain) Sergi Bruguera
1998	(Morocco) Younes El Aynaoui
1999	(United States) Chris Woodruff
2000	(Spain) Sergi Bruguera (2)
2001	(Argentina) Guillermo Cañas
2002	(Netherlands) Richard Krajicek
2003	(Australia) Mark Philippoussis
2004	(Germany) Tommy Haas
2005	(United States) James Blake
2006	(United States) Mardy Fish
2007	(Russia) Igor Andreev
2008	(Germany) Rainer Schüttler
2009	(Switzerland) Marco Chiudinelli
2010	(Netherlands) Robin Haase
2011	(Argentina) Juan Martín del Potro
2012	(Germany) Tommy Haas (2)
2013	(Spain) Rafael Nadal
2014	(Belgium) David Goffin
2015	(France) Benoît Paire
2016	(Argentina) Juan Martín del Potro (2)
2017	(Switzerland) Roger Federer
2018	(Serbia) Novak Djokovic
2019	(United Kingdom) Andy Murray
2020	(Canada) Vasek Pospisil
2021	(United States) Mackenzie McDonald
2022	(Croatia) Borna Ćorić
2023	(Germany) Jan-Lennard Struff
2024	(Italy) Matteo Berrettini

*From 2013 to 2017, this award was named ATP Star of Tomorrow, and it was given to the youngest player who ended the year in the Top 100 of the ATP Singles Rankings. If two or more players in the Top 100 shared the youngest birth year, the higher-ranked player won the award.

== Breakthrough of the Year ==
The ATP Breakthrough of the Year award was introduced in 2025 and replaces the awards for Most Improved Player, Comeback Player and Newcomer of the Year. It is awarded to the player who made the biggest breakthrough on the ATP Tour this season, with consideration given to milestone wins, significant jumps in the ATP Rankings and first ATP Tour titles, with a preference for achievements by young talents. The award is voted on by current and former ATP players who have reached world No. 1.

Breakthrough of the Year
2025	(Monaco) Valentin Vacherot

== Fans' Favourite ==
The ATP Fans' Favourite award is voted online by tennis fans from the top 25 singles players and top 15 doubles teams in the year's Race Rankings as of the rankings update after the US Open is concluded.

The pool was later expanded to include the top 100 singles players and the top 20 doubles teams.

Year	Player
2000	(Brazil) Gustavo Kuerten
2001	(Russia) Marat Safin
2002	(Russia) Marat Safin (2)
2003	(Switzerland) Roger Federer
2004	(Switzerland) Roger Federer (2)
2005	(Switzerland) Roger Federer (3)
2006	(Switzerland) Roger Federer (4)
2007	(Switzerland) Roger Federer (5)
2008	(Switzerland) Roger Federer (6)
2009	(Switzerland) Roger Federer (7)
2010	(Switzerland) Roger Federer (8)
2011	(Switzerland) Roger Federer (9)
2012	(Switzerland) Roger Federer (10)
2013	(Switzerland) Roger Federer (11)
2014	(Switzerland) Roger Federer (12)
2015	(Switzerland) Roger Federer (13)
2016	(Switzerland) Roger Federer (14)
2017	(Switzerland) Roger Federer (15)
2018	(Switzerland) Roger Federer (16)
2019	(Switzerland) Roger Federer (17)
2020	(Switzerland) Roger Federer (18)
2021	(Switzerland) Roger Federer (19)
2022	(Spain) Rafael Nadal
2023	(Italy) Jannik Sinner
2024	(Italy) Jannik Sinner (2)
2025	(Italy) Jannik Sinner (3)

Year	Team
2005	(United States) Bob Bryan & (United States) Mike Bryan (team article)
2006	(United States) Bob Bryan (2) & (United States) Mike Bryan (2)
2007	(United States) Bob Bryan (3) & (United States) Mike Bryan (3)
2008	(United States) Bob Bryan (4) & (United States) Mike Bryan (4)
2009	(United States) Bob Bryan (5) & (United States) Mike Bryan (5)
2010	(United States) Bob Bryan (6) & (United States) Mike Bryan (6)
2011	(United States) Bob Bryan (7) & (United States) Mike Bryan (7)
2012	(United States) Bob Bryan (8) & (United States) Mike Bryan (8)
2013	(United States) Bob Bryan (9) & (United States) Mike Bryan (9)
2014	(United States) Bob Bryan (10) & (United States) Mike Bryan (10)
2015	(United States) Bob Bryan (11) & (United States) Mike Bryan (11)
2016	(United States) Bob Bryan (12) & (United States) Mike Bryan (12)
2017	(United States) Bob Bryan (13) & (United States) Mike Bryan (13)
2018	(United States) Mike Bryan (14) & (United States) Jack Sock
2019	(United States) Bob Bryan (14) & (United States) Mike Bryan (15)
2020	(United Kingdom) Jamie Murray & (United Kingdom) Neal Skupski
2021	(France) Pierre-Hugues Herbert & (France) Nicolas Mahut
2022	(Australia) Thanasi Kokkinakis & (Australia) Nick Kyrgios
2023	(Russia) Karen Khachanov & (Russia) Andrey Rublev
2024	(Italy) Simone Bolelli & (Italy) Andrea Vavassori
2025	(Italy) Simone Bolelli & (Italy) Andrea Vavassori (2)

== Stefan Edberg Sportsmanship Award ==
Nominees for the ATP's Sportsmanship Award, named after Stefan Edberg since 1996, are determined by an International Tennis Writers' Association (ITWA) vote. Since 2025, current and former ATP players to have reached world No. 1 then vote for a winner from the list of nominees. The award goes to the player who, throughout the year, conducted himself at the highest level of professionalism and integrity, who competed with his fellow players with the utmost spirit of fairness and who promoted the game through his off-court activities.

↓ ATP Sportsmanship ↓
1977	(United States) Arthur Ashe
1978	not awarded
1979	(United States) Stan Smith
1980	(Chile) Jaime Fillol
1981	(Argentina) José Luis Clerc
1982	(United States) Steve Denton
1983	(Spain) José Higueras
1984	(United States) Brian Gottfried
1985	(Sweden) Mats Wilander
1986	(France) Yannick Noah
1987	(Czechoslovakia) Miloslav Mečíř
1988	(Sweden) Stefan Edberg
1989	(Sweden) Stefan Edberg (2)
1990	(Sweden) Stefan Edberg (3)
1991	(Australia) John Fitzgerald
1992	(Sweden) Stefan Edberg (4)
1993	(United States) Todd Martin
1994	(United States) Todd Martin (2)
1995	(Sweden) Stefan Edberg (5)

↓ Stefan Edberg Sportsmanship ↓
1996	(Spain) Àlex Corretja
1997	(Australia) Pat Rafter
1998	(Spain) Àlex Corretja (2)
1999	(Australia) Pat Rafter (2)
2000	(Australia) Pat Rafter (3)
2001	(Australia) Pat Rafter (4)
2002	(Thailand) Paradorn Srichaphan
2003	(Thailand) Paradorn Srichaphan (2)
2004	(Switzerland) Roger Federer
2005	(Switzerland) Roger Federer (2)
2006	(Switzerland) Roger Federer (3)
2007	(Switzerland) Roger Federer (4)
2008	(Switzerland) Roger Federer (5)
2009	(Switzerland) Roger Federer (6)
2010	(Spain) Rafael Nadal
2011	(Switzerland) Roger Federer (7)
2012	(Switzerland) Roger Federer (8)
2013	(Switzerland) Roger Federer (9)
2014	(Switzerland) Roger Federer (10)
2015	(Switzerland) Roger Federer (11)
2016	(Switzerland) Roger Federer (12)
2017	(Switzerland) Roger Federer (13)
2018	(Spain) Rafael Nadal (2)
2019	(Spain) Rafael Nadal (3)
2020	(Spain) Rafael Nadal (4)
2021	(Spain) Rafael Nadal (5)
2022	(Norway) Casper Ruud
2023	(Spain) Carlos Alcaraz
2024	(Bulgaria) Grigor Dimitrov
2025	(Spain) Carlos Alcaraz (2)

== Arthur Ashe Humanitarian & Ron Bookman Media Excellence awards ==
The Arthur Ashe Humanitarian award - This award is presented by the ATP to a person, not necessarily an ATP player, who has made outstanding humanitarian contributions.
The Ron Bookman Media Excellence award - This award is presented by the ATP to journalists who have made "significant contributions to the game of tennis".

Arthur Ashe Humanitarian Award recipients
1983	(United States) John McEnroe
1984	(United States) Alan King
1985	(United States) Stan Smith (United States) Margie Smith
1986	(United States) Kay McEnroe
1987	(United States) Rob Finkelstein
1988	not given
1989	not given
1990	(France) Marie-Claire Noah
1991	(Republic of Ireland) John O'Shea
1992	(United States) Arthur Ashe
1993	(United States) Orville Brown
1994	(Australia) Paul McNamee
1995	(United States) Andre Agassi
1996	(United States) Paul Flory
1997	(South Africa) Nelson Mandela
1998	(Australia) Patrick Rafter
1999	(United States) Mac Winker
2000	(Netherlands) Richard Krajicek
2001	(United States) Andre Agassi (2)
2002	(Israel) Amir Hadad (Pakistan) Aisam-ul-Haq Qureshi
2003	(Brazil) Gustavo Kuerten
2004	(United States) Andy Roddick
2005	(Spain) Carlos Moyà
2006	(Switzerland) Roger Federer
2007	(Croatia) Ivan Ljubičić
2008	(United States) James Blake
2009	(United States) MaliVai Washington
2010	(India) Rohan Bopanna (Pakistan) Aisam-ul-Haq Qureshi (2)
2011	(Spain) Rafael Nadal
2012	(Serbia) Novak Djokovic
2013	(Switzerland) Roger Federer (2)
2014	(United Kingdom) Andy Murray
2015	(United States) Bob Bryan (United States) Mike Bryan
2016	(Croatia) Marin Čilić
2017	(Romania) Horia Tecău
2018	(Spain) Tommy Robredo
2019	(South Africa) Kevin Anderson
2020	(United States) Frances Tiafoe
2021	(New Zealand) Marcus Daniell
2022	(United Kingdom) Andy Murray (2)
2023	(Canada) Félix Auger-Aliassime
2024	(Austria) Dominic Thiem
2025	(Russia) Andrey Rublev

Ron Bookman Media Excellence Award recipients
1984	(United States) Russ Adams
1985	(United States) Robert Briner
1986	(United States) Richard Evans
1987	not given
1988	not given
1989	not given
1990	(France) Philippe Bouin
1991	(United States) Russ Adams (2)
1992	(United Kingdom) Dan Maskell
1993	(Italy) Rino Tommasi
1994	(Europe) European Tennis Press
1995	(Italy) Gianni Ciaccia
1996	(United States) Brett Haber
1997	(United Kingdom) John Anthony Parsons
1998	(Germany) Gerd Szepanski
1999	(France) L'Équipe
2000	(United Kingdom) Iain Carter
2001	(United States) Christopher Clarey
2002	(Spain) Pedro Hernández
2003	(United Kingdom) John Anthony Parsons (2)
2004	(United States) Tennis Channel
2005	(United Kingdom) Neil Harman
2006	(United Kingdom) John Barrett
2007	(United States) Bud Collins
2008	(Australia) Alan Trengove
2009	(Italy) Vincenzo Martucci
2010	(France) L'Équipe (2)
2011	(Spain) Juan José Mateo
2012	(United Kingdom) Paul Newman
2013	(China) Bendou Zhang
2014	(United States) Douglas Robson
2015	(Australia) Linda Pearce
2016	(United Kingdom) Mike Dickson
2017	(Argentina) Guillermo Salatino
2018	(United Kingdom) Sue Barker
2019	(Australia) Courtney Walsh
2020	(Australia) Kevin Mitchell
2021	(India) Prajwal Hegde
2022	(Argentina) Sebastián Torok
2023	(France) L'Équipe (3)
2024	(Spain) Joan Solsona

== Tournaments of the Year ==
The Tournament of the Year awards are voted by the ATP players for the different categories: ATP Tour Masters 1000, ATP Tour 500 and ATP Tour 250. The awards go to the tournament in its category that operated at the highest level of professionalism and integrity and which provided the best conditions and atmosphere for participating players.

Year	ATP Masters	ATP Tour 500	ATP Tour 250
1986	no Masters level tournaments	Cincinnati	Stuttgart
1987	no Masters level tournaments	Stratton Mountain	Stuttgart (2)
1988	no Masters level tournaments	Indianapolis	Stuttgart (3)
1989	no Masters level tournaments	Indianapolis (2)	Stuttgart (4)
1990	no Masters level tournaments	Indianapolis (3)	Memphis
1991	no Masters level tournaments	Indianapolis (4)	Gstaad
1992	no Masters level tournaments	Indianapolis (5)	Scottsdale
1993	no Masters level tournaments	Indianapolis (6)	Scottsdale (2)
1994	no Masters level tournaments	Indianapolis (7)	Sun City
1995	no Masters level tournaments	Indianapolis (8)	Tel Aviv
1996	no Masters level tournaments	Indianapolis (9)	Gstaad (2)
1997	no Masters level tournaments	Indianapolis (10)	Kitzbühel
1998	no Masters level tournaments	Miami	Dubai
1999	no Masters level tournaments	Miami (2)	Lyon & Scottsdale (3)
2000	no Masters level tournaments	Miami (3)	Halle
2001	Monte Carlo	Indianapolis (11)	Shanghai
2002	Miami (4)	Kitzbühel	Båstad
2003	Miami (5)	Dubai (2)	Houston & Båstad (2)
2004	Miami (6)	Dubai (3)	Houston (2) & Båstad (3)
2005	Miami (7)	Dubai (4)	Båstad (4)
2006	Miami (8)	Dubai (5)	Båstad (5)
2007	Monte Carlo (2)	Acapulco	Båstad (6)
2008	Miami (9)	Dubai (6)	Båstad (7)
2009	Shanghai (2)	Dubai (7)	Båstad (8)
2010	Shanghai (3)	Dubai (8)	Båstad (9)
2011	Shanghai (4)	Dubai (9)	Båstad (10)
2012	Shanghai (5)	Dubai (10)	Båstad (11)
2013	Shanghai (6)	Dubai (11)	Queen's Club
2014	Indian Wells	Dubai (12)	Queen's Club (2)
2015	Indian Wells (2)	Queen's Club (3)	Doha & St. Petersburg
2016	Indian Wells (3)	Queen's Club (4)	Stockholm & Winston-Salem
2017	Indian Wells (4)	Acapulco (2)	Doha (2)
2018	Indian Wells (5)	Queen's Club (5)	Stockholm (2)
2019	Indian Wells (6)	Acapulco (3)	Doha (3)
2020	Not awarded due to COVID-19 pandemic		
2021	Indian Wells (7)	Vienna	Doha (4)
2022	Indian Wells (8)	Queen's Club (6)	Doha (5)
2023	Indian Wells (9)	Queen's Club (7)	Båstad (12)
2024	Indian Wells (10)	Queen's Club (8)	Doha (6)
2025	Cincinnati (2)	Doha (7)	Båstad (13)

== See also ==
- WTA Awards
- ITF World Champions
- World number 1 ranked male tennis players
- World number 1 ranked female tennis players
- Tennis statistics
