= Gilles Cervara =

French tennis coach (born 1981)

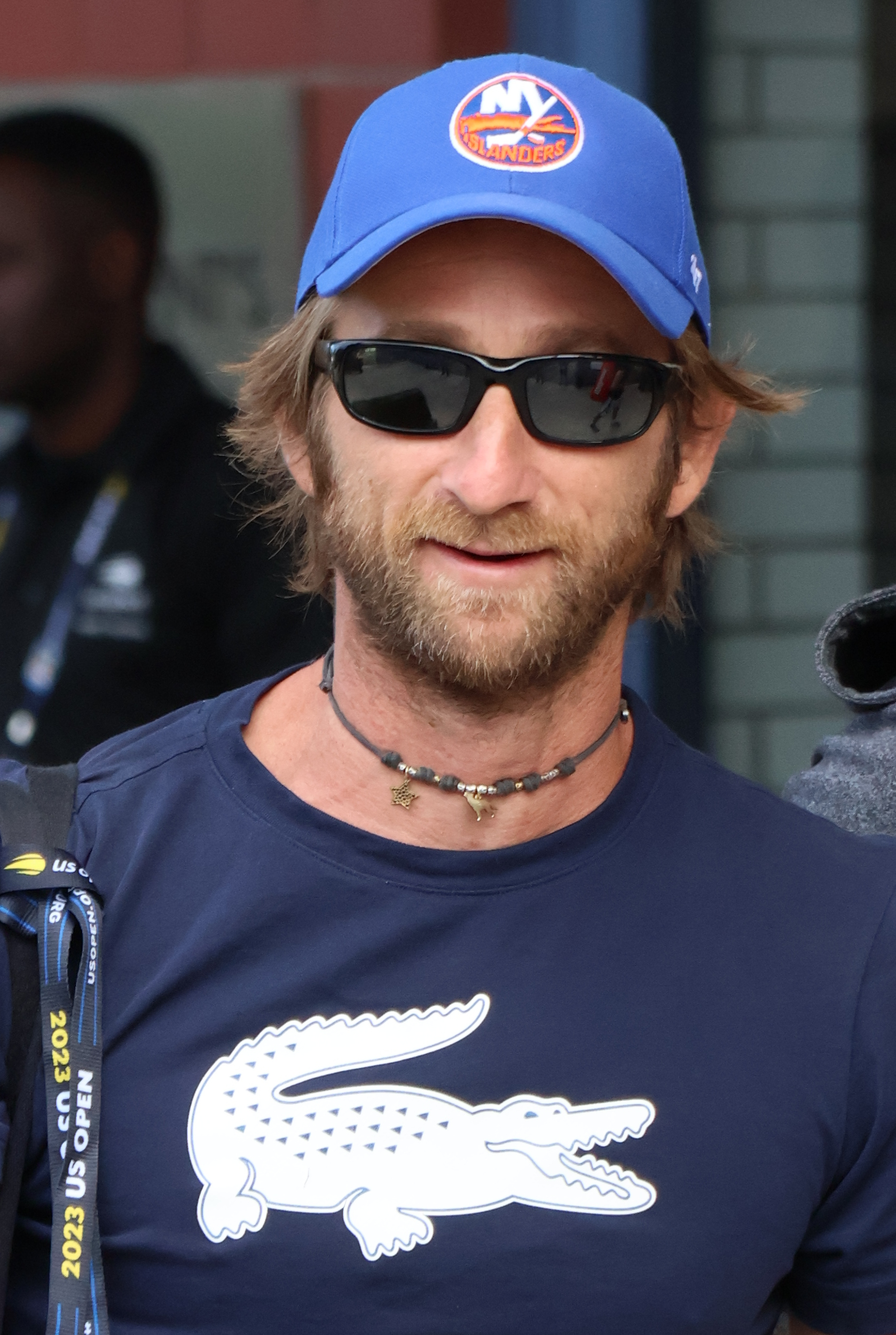
- Cervara at the 2023 US Open
- Country (sports): France
- Residence: Cannes, France
- Born: 2 January 1981 (age 45) Cannes, France

Coaching career (2007–present)
- Daniil Medvedev (2017–Aug 2025); Nishesh Basavareddy (Dec 2025–Apr 2026); Hubert Hurkacz (May 2026-)

Coaching achievements
- List of notable tournaments (with champion): 2021 US Open (Medvedev); 2020 ATP Finals (Medvedev)

Coaching awards and records
- Awards 2019 ATP Coach of the Year
- Last updated on: 15 June 2026.

Gilles Cervara (born 2 January 1981) is a French tennis coach.

== Career ==
Cervara has been coaching since 2007, and previously worked full-time with Daniil Medvedev from 2017 until 2025, helping him capture twenty ATP Tour singles titles and reach a career-high ranking of World No. 1. Cervara's previous job as a hitting partner included such famous clients as Thomas Enqvist, Justine Henin, and Marat Safin.

Cervara was chosen by his peers as Coach of the Year in the 2019 ATP Awards. He was nominated for the award again in 2020 and in 2021, but the award was eventually bestowed on Fernando Vicente and Facundo Lugones, respectively.

In September 2025, Medvedev and Cervara confirmed their split after Medvedev's first round exit at the 2025 US Open.

Awards and achievements
Preceded by (Slovakia) Marián Vajda	ATP Coach of the Year; 2019	Succeeded by (Spain) Fernando Vicente
