= 2011 Copa Claro – Singles Qualifying =

This article displays the qualifying draw of the 2011 Copa Claro.

== Players ==
=== Seeds ===
1. (Spain) Albert Ramos-Viñolas (qualified)
2. (Spain) Daniel Muñoz-de la Nava (second round)
3. (Argentina) Diego Junqueira (qualifying competition)
4. (Chile) Paul Capdeville (qualifying competition)
5. (Australia) Peter Luczak (second round)
6. (Romania) Adrian Ungur (first round)
7. (Spain) Iván Navarro (qualified)
8. (Argentina) Juan Pablo Brzezicki (qualified)

=== Qualifiers ===
1. (Spain) Albert Ramos-Viñolas
2. (Argentina) Pablo Galdón
3. (Spain) Iván Navarro
4. (Argentina) Juan Pablo Brzezicki

== Qualifying draw ==
=== First qualifier ===
First Round
1	(Spain) Albert Ramos-Viñolas	6	6
(Italy) Alessandro Giannessi	3	2
(Argentina) Guillermo Durán	1	3
(Argentina) Juan-Pablo Villar	6	6
(Chile) Jorge Aguilar	6^{6}	7	4
(Brazil) Ricardo Hocevar	7	5	6
(Argentina) Martín Vassallo Argüello	6	5	4
5	(Australia) Peter Luczak	3	7	6

Second Round
1	(Spain) Albert Ramos-Viñolas	6	6
(Argentina) Juan-Pablo Villar	1	1
(Brazil) Ricardo Hocevar	6	7
5	(Australia) Peter Luczak	4	6^{4}

Qualifying Competition
1	(Spain) Albert Ramos-Viñolas	6	6
(Brazil) Ricardo Hocevar	4	2

=== Second qualifier ===
First Round
2	(Spain) Daniel Muñoz-de la Nava	6	7
(Argentina) Marco Trungelliti	3	5
(Ecuador) Giovanni Lapentti	6	6
(Brazil) Caio Zampieri	4	2
(Argentina) Facundo Bagnis	6	6
(Argentina) Renzo Olivo	0	1
(Argentina) Pablo Galdón	6	7
6	(Romania) Adrian Ungur	2	5

Second Round
2	(Spain) Daniel Muñoz-de la Nava	2	6	6^{6}
(Ecuador) Giovanni Lapentti	6	1	7
(Argentina) Facundo Bagnis	6	6^{4}	4
(Argentina) Pablo Galdón	1	7	6

Qualifying Competition
(Ecuador) Giovanni Lapentti	3	6	4
(Argentina) Pablo Galdón	6	1	6

=== Third qualifier ===
First Round
3	(Argentina) Diego Junqueira	6	6
(Argentina) Alejandro Fabbri	0	2
(Argentina) Guido Andreozzi	4	4
(Argentina) Lionel Noviski	6	6
WC	(Argentina) Juan Ignacio Londero	2	4
(Spain) David Marrero	6	6
WC	(Argentina) Gonzalo Tur	4	2
7	(Spain) Iván Navarro	6	6

Second Round
3	(Argentina) Diego Junqueira	6	6
(Argentina) Lionel Noviski	3	3
(Spain) David Marrero	4	7	6^{5}
7	(Spain) Iván Navarro	6	5	7

Qualifying Competition
3	(Argentina) Diego Junqueira	6^{3}	5
7	(Spain) Iván Navarro	7	7

=== Fourth qualifier ===
First Round
4	(Chile) Paul Capdeville	6	6
WC	(Argentina) Facundo Lugones	4	0
WC	(Argentina) Diego Sebastián Schwartzman	6	6
(United States) Andrea Collarini	1	1
(Argentina) Agustín Velotti	6	4	6
(Argentina) Facundo Argüello	3	6	0
(Argentina) Juan-Pablo Amado	1	1
8	(Argentina) Juan Pablo Brzezicki	6	6

Second Round
4	(Chile) Paul Capdeville	6	6
WC	(Argentina) Diego Sebastián Schwartzman	1	4
(Argentina) Agustín Velotti	5	0
8	(Argentina) Juan Pablo Brzezicki	7	6

Qualifying Competition
4	(Chile) Paul Capdeville	3	6	2
8	(Argentina) Juan Pablo Brzezicki	6	3	6
