= Cameron Norrie =

British professional tennis player (born 1995)

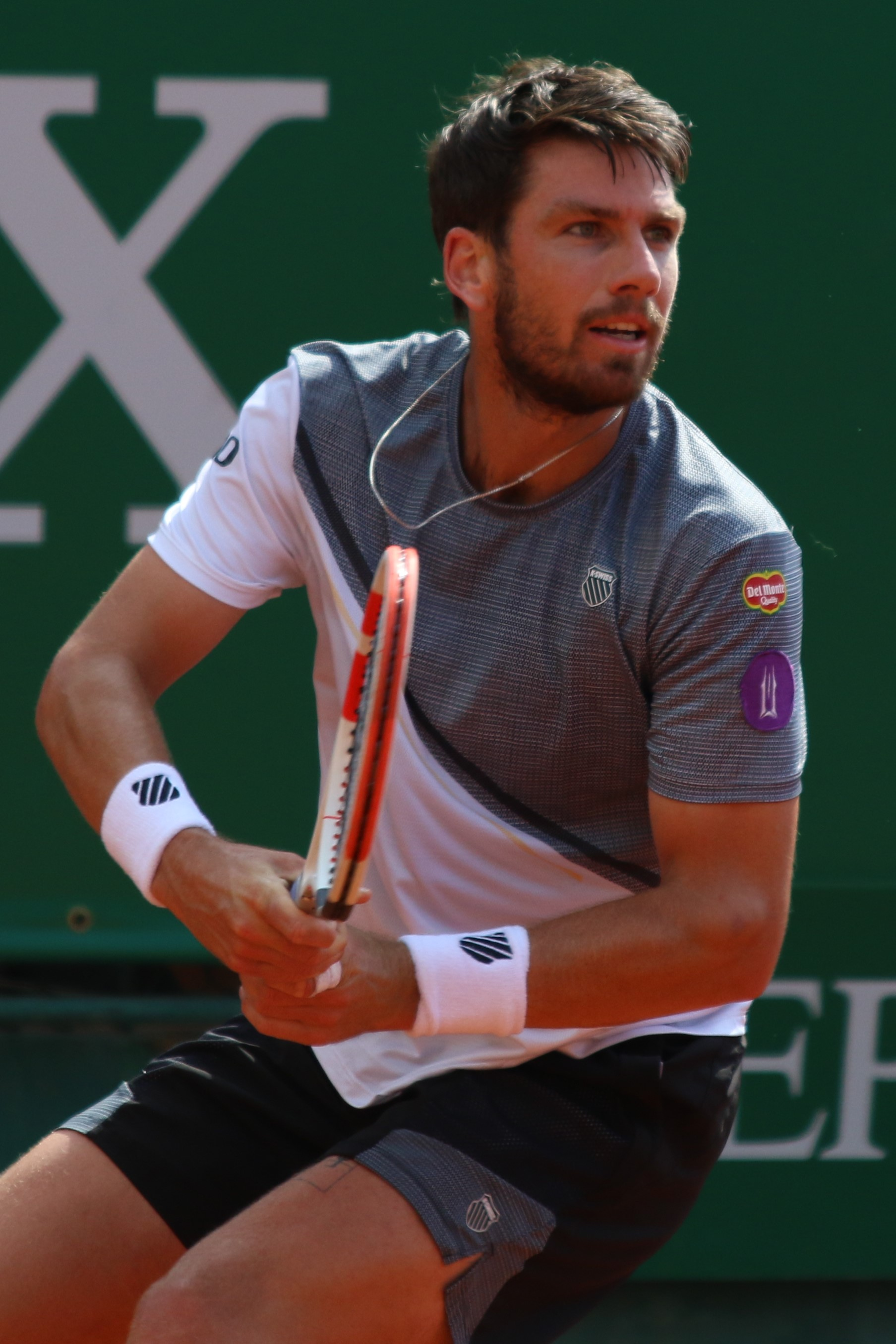
- Norrie in 2023
- Country (sports): New Zealand (2009–2013) (United Kingdom) Great Britain (2013–)
- Born: 23 August 1995 (age 31) Johannesburg, South Africa
- Height: 1.88 m (6 ft 2 in)
- Turned pro: 2017
- Plays: Left-handed (two-handed backhand)
- College: Texas Christian University
- Coach: Facundo Lugones (2017–present), James Trotman (2013–2023), Kevin Konf
- Prize money: US $16,241,716

Singles
- Career record: 266–204
- Career titles: 5
- Highest ranking: No. 8 (12 September 2022)
- Current ranking: No. 53 (9 November 2026)

Grand Slam singles results
- Australian Open: 4R (2024)
- French Open: 4R (2025)
- Wimbledon: SF (2022)
- US Open: 4R (2022)

Other tournaments
- Tour Finals: RR (2021)

Doubles
- Career record: 40–52
- Career titles: 1
- Highest ranking: No. 117 (13 June 2022)

Grand Slam doubles results
- Australian Open: 2R (2019)
- French Open: 2R (2019, 2020)
- Wimbledon: 3R (2021)
- US Open: 2R (2019)

Grand Slam mixed doubles results
- Wimbledon: 1R (2017)

Team competitions
- Davis Cup: QF (2021)
- Hopman Cup: RR (2019)
- Last updated on: 9 November 2026.

Cameron Norrie (/ˈnɒri/; born 23 August 1995) is a British professional tennis player. He has a career-high ATP singles ranking of world No. 8, achieved on 12 September 2022 and a doubles ranking of No. 117, achieved on 13 June 2022. He is currently the No. 2 British singles player.

As a junior, Norrie reached an ITF combined ranking of No. 10. He began representing Great Britain in 2013. Norrie attended Texas Christian University in 2014-2017.

After turning professional in 2017, Norrie made his top 200 debut that July following his first ATP Challenger title. He ended the year with three Challenger titles from four finals. In 2021, Norrie competed in six ATP finals, including his first at the ATP 500 and ATP Masters 1000 levels; he won two titles and sealed his top 20 debut following a victory at the 2021 Indian Wells Masters. He continued his momentum into the 2022 season, rising to the top 10 after claiming two additional ATP titles from four finals and reaching his maiden major semifinal at Wimbledon. Between October 2021 and June 2024, Norrie held the title of British No. 1 in men's singles. As of 2025, he has won five ATP Tour singles titles and one doubles title.

== Early life ==
Cameron Norrie was born on 23 August 1995 in Johannesburg, South Africa, to British microbiologist parents: his father David is Scottish from Glasgow and his mother Helen is Welsh from Cardiff.

In 1998, when Norrie was three, he and his family moved to Auckland, New Zealand, after being victims of a burglary in South Africa. Norrie said: "I don't remember too much about it, but my mum told me it got a little bit too dangerous so we moved to New Zealand." While in Auckland, Norrie attended high school at Macleans College. His parents lived in New Zealand until 2023, when they moved back to the United Kingdom.

At the age of 16, he moved to the United Kingdom, living in London for three years. In April 2013, at the age of 17, Norrie switched his allegiance to Great Britain, the country of origin of both of his parents.

== Early career ==
=== Junior career ===
Norrie represented New Zealand as a junior, becoming No. 10 in the world, but received only a few thousand dollars from Tennis NZ. As a result, his parents had to finance his overseas travel. At fifteen, he toured the ITF's European junior circuit for five months.

In April 2013, at the age of 17, Norrie switched his allegiance to Great Britain (the country of origin of both of his parents) due to a lack of available funding in New Zealand. He lived and trained at the National Tennis Centre in London, later residing with a host family for two years while he continued his training.

Norrie had difficulty on the European tennis circuit, so he considered training at an American university.

=== University career ===
From 2014 to 2017, Norrie played collegiate tennis at Texas Christian University (TCU) in Fort Worth, Texas, where he ended his final collegiate season as the school's first-ever player to be ranked No. 1 by the Intercollegiate Tennis Association (ITA). He studied sociology on a sports scholarship at (TCU) and joined the Horned Frogs university team, becoming the first TCU student to be the top-ranked male college tennis player in the US. In addition, Norrie was ranked All-American three times.

In the 2016–17 season, Norrie was the only player to win every Big 12 match he participated in, with a 10–0 record in singles and doubles. In spite of being seeded No 1, Norrie missed the end of season NCAA Championships and put a hold on his studies so that he could turn professional.

== Professional career ==
=== 2013–16: ATP qualifying and ITF Tour debuts ===
In January 2013, Norrie played his first senior tournament at the ATP Auckland Open, winning the first qualifying round.

Turning 18, Norrie was ranked No. 1348 in August 2013, but a semifinal showing at the Canada Futures F6 improved his ranking to No. 973, rising to No. 637 by June 2014. Whilst studying at university, he played only sporadically on the tour, falling to No. 1114 in October 2015. On 11 October 2015, Norrie won the USA Futures F29 at Mansfield, Texas.

Back-to-back titles at the USA Futures F21 and USA Futures F23 pushed him to No. 422 in July 2016. A month later, at the all-British final of the 2016 Aptos Challenger, Norrie was beaten by Dan Evans.

=== 2017: ATP and major debuts ===
Norrie played three events in January, reaching the semifinal of the Maui Challenger to become world No. 238. For the Davis Cup World Group match against France, Norrie joined the British team as a hitting partner. After completing three years of his four-year university course, Norrie turned professional in June, competing at the Surbiton and Nottingham Challengers, but still had a training base at TCU in Fort Worth.

Norrie made his ATP main-draw debut at the Aegon Championships, after receiving a wildcard into the singles main draw, where he was defeated by Sam Querrey in the first round. Norrie earned his first ATP main-draw victory by beating Horacio Zeballos at Eastbourne, which was his first win over a top-50 player.

Awarded a wildcard for Wimbledon, Norrie was beaten by Jo-Wilfried Tsonga, the 12th seed, in the opening round. In July, Norrie won his first Challenger title at Binghamton, which had previously been won by Kyle Edmund in 2015, and Andy Murray in 2005. He qualified for the main draw of the 2017 US Open, making his debut at this major, where he progressed to the second round recording his first major victory over Dmitry Tursunov, following his second-set retirement (and last match of Tursunov's career).

Reaching the Cary Challenger final, followed by successive Challenger titles in Tiburon and Stockton, pushed Norrie to world No. 111 in October. In December, his Argentine coach Facundo Lugones arranged a four-week training camp in Buenos Aires, where Norrie hit with Juan Martin Del Potro and Diego Schwartzman.

=== 2018: Top 100 debut and first ATP doubles title ===
In February, Norrie was selected for the Davis Cup team for the first time, for Great Britain's World Group first round match against Spain. He recorded the biggest win of his career in his first match, coming from two sets down to defeat world No. 23 Roberto Bautista-Agut in five sets.

Norrie made his ATP main-draw debut at Delray Beach Open as a lucky loser. He lost in the first round to Hyeon Chung. He qualified for his ATP World Tour Masters 1000 main-draw debut at the Indian Wells Masters in March 2018, but lost in the first round to Taro Daniel. He qualified for his second successive ATP World Tour Masters 1000 at the Miami Open, but lost to Nicolás Jarry in the first round.

At the Estoril Open, Norrie teamed up with fellow Briton Kyle Edmund in the doubles and won his maiden ATP Title, defeating Wesley Koolhof and Artem Sitak and without dropping a set throughout the entire tournament. At Lyon, he registered his first win over a top-10 ranked opponent, John Isner, and reached his first ATP semifinal, which he lost to Gilles Simon.

At the French Open Norrie was a direct entrant into a major tournament for the first time. He played Peter Gojowczyk in the opening round, and won after Gojowczyk retired through injury. In the second round he faced Frenchman Lucas Pouille on the Philippe Chatrier court. Norrie eventually lost to the French number one in five sets, after darkness interrupted play at the end of the fourth set.

Norrie reached the quarter finals at the Eastbourne International. He reached his second ATP semifinal at the Atlanta Open after beating Malek Jaziri, sixth seed Jérémy Chardy and second seed Nick Kyrgios. Norrie lost to Ryan Harrison in three sets. A week later he continued his good form on hard courts, by reaching the semifinals of Los Cabos Open with a win over fourth seed Adrian Mannarino, before losing to second seed Jérémy Chardy.

=== 2019: First ATP final, ATP 500 semifinal, top 50 ===
Norrie received a wildcard into the main draw of the 2019 Auckland Open, in which he beat Benoît Paire, João Sousa, Taylor Fritz and Jan-Lennard Struff to reach his debut ATP final. He lost to Tennys Sandgren in straight sets.

In March, he reached his first ATP 500 semifinal in Acapulco, with wins over Yoshihito Nishioka, fourth seed Diego Schwartzman and Mackenzie McDonald. As a result Norrie reached the top 50 in the singles rankings on 4 March 2019, following the tournament. He lost to second seed Alexander Zverev in straight sets.

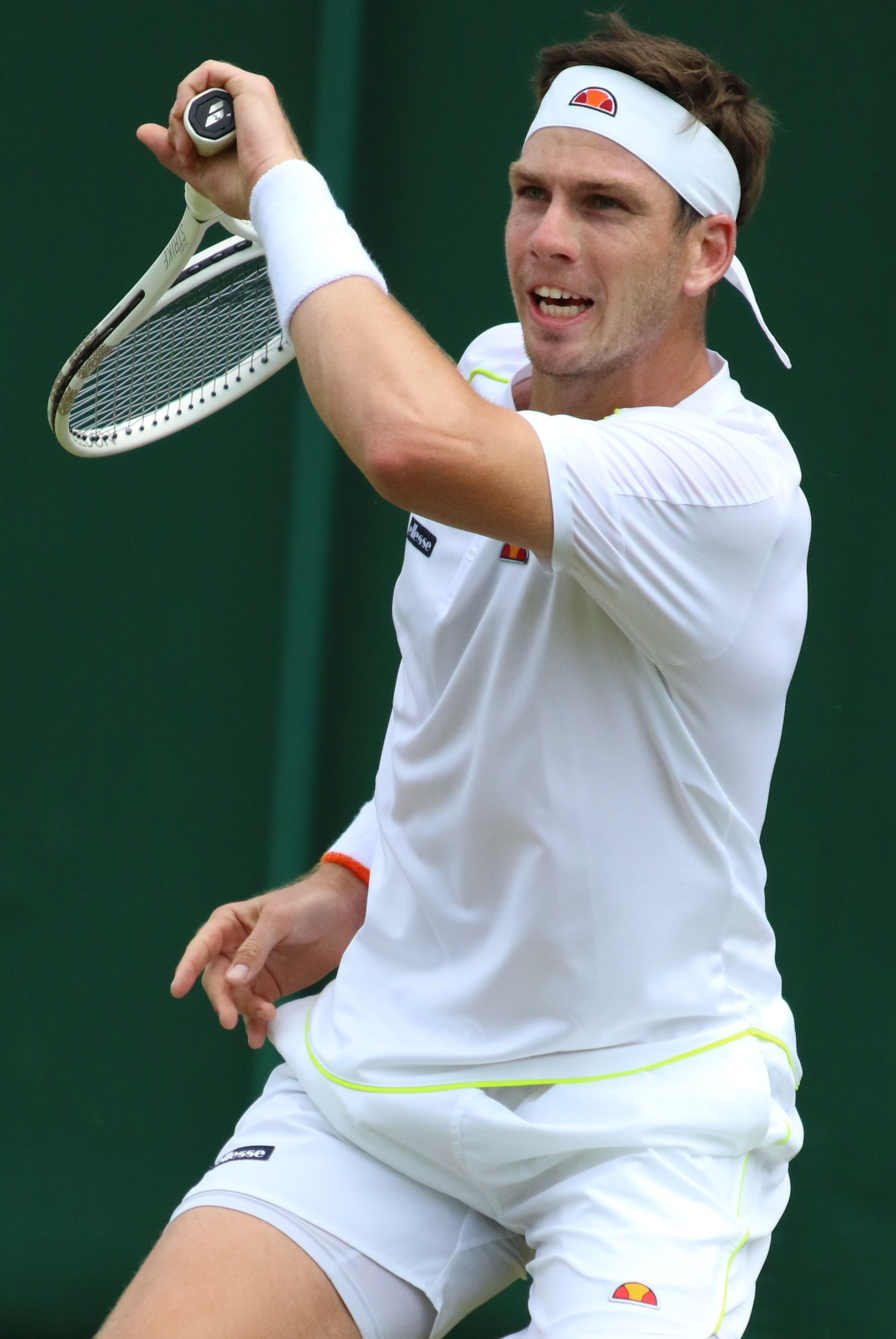
Norrie at the 2019 Wimbledon Championships

Norrie reached the third round of an ATP 1000 event for the first time in his career at the Monte-Carlo Masters, where he defeated Adrian Mannarino, and Márton Fucsovics, before losing to qualifier Lorenzo Sonego. In the first round of the French Open men's singles, Norrie lost to qualifier Elliot Benchetrit in straight sets.

At Wimbledon, Norrie reached the second round with a win over Denis Istomin, before losing to eighth seed Kei Nishikori in straight sets in his first match on Centre Court. He reached the semifinals in Atlanta, losing to Taylor Fritz in three sets, after defeating seventh seed Jordan Thompson, Kwon Soon-woo and Alexei Popyrin to make it through to the last four, at which point he once again lost to Taylor Fritz in three sets.

Norrie lost to qualifier Grégoire Barrère in the first round at the US Open, losing in a tiebreaker in the fifth set. he qualified for the China Open and he reached the second round after Cristian Garín retired. Norrie lost to Andy Murray in the second round in three sets.

He qualified for the Shanghai Masters and beat Gilles Simon to reach the second round, where he lost to third seed Daniil Medvedev in straight sets. Norrie qualified for the Paris Masters, but lost to Milos Raonic in straight sets in the first round.

=== 2020–21: First ATP 1000 title, British No. 1 ===
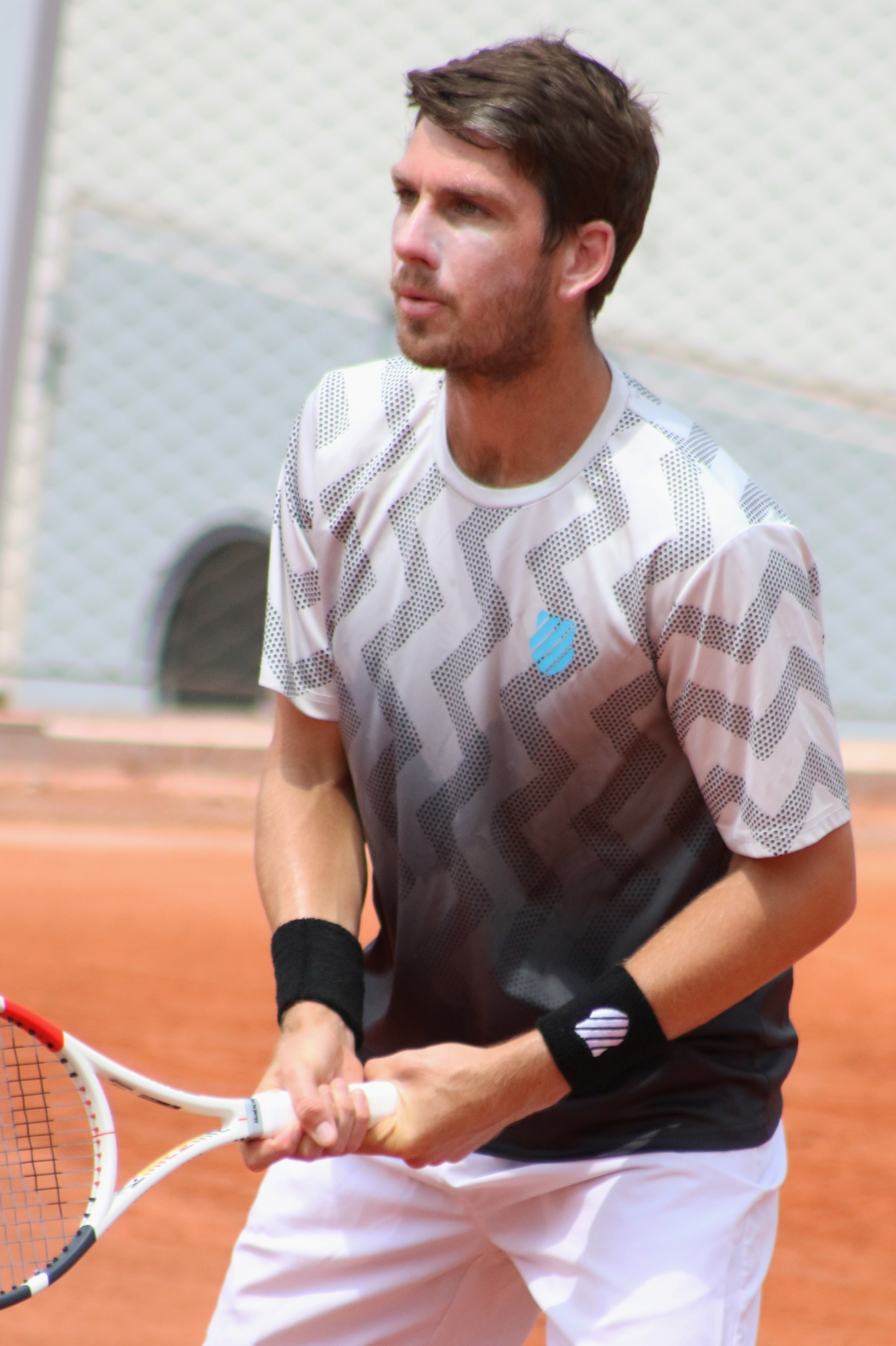
Norrie at the 2021 French Open

In the opening round of the 2020 US Open, Norrie upset the ninth seed Diego Schwartzman in five sets. He then defeated Federico Coria, before falling in the third round to Alejandro Davidovich Fokina.

He matched this performance by reaching the same round at the 2021 Australian Open, where he was defeated by the world No. 2 Rafael Nadal.

Norrie reached his second ATP Tour singles final at the Estoril Open, defeating second seed Christian Garín and sixth seed Marin Čilić before losing to Albert Ramos Viñolas in the final. In May 2021, he achieved his biggest career win by beating world No. 4 Dominic Thiem at the Lyon Open. He continued by reaching the final after defeating eighth seed Karen Khachanov, where he was beaten by second seed Stefanos Tsitsipas. Norrie reached the third round of a major once again at the French Open, where he lost to Rafael Nadal in straight sets. At the Queen's Club Championships, he defeated world No. 24 Aslan Karatsev, Jack Draper and Denis Shapovalov to reach the final, where he fell to Matteo Berrettini. At Wimbledon, Norrie reached the third round of a major yet again, where he was defeated by the sixth seed Roger Federer in four sets.

Norrie won his first ATP title at the Los Cabos Open, beating Brandon Nakashima in the final. As a result, he reached a new career in the top 30 in the singles rankings, at world No. 29 on 26 July 2021. In the Atlanta Open, Norrie defeated Nick Kyrgios in the first round before losing in straight sets to Emil Ruusuvuori.

At the US Open, Norrie was defeated in straight sets in the opening round by Carlos Alcaraz. In September, he was called as an alternate for the 2021 Laver Cup, but did not play. Norrie won his 40th match win of the season at the San Diego Open, defeating world No. 13 Denis Shapovalov. In the semifinals, Norrie came from a set down to defeat world No. 5 and top seed Andrey Rublev and reach his fifth final of the season. There, he was defeated by Casper Ruud.

In October, Norrie reached his first ATP 1000 final at Indian Wells. Seeded 21st, he beat Tennys Sandgren, Roberto Bautista Agut and Tommy Paul. He then defeated Diego Schwartzman to advance to the semifinals and surpass Dan Evans as the British No. 1 in men's singles. He defeated Grigor Dimitrov in straight sets to advance to the final, where he came from a set and a break down to beat Nikoloz Basilashvili and win the title.

At the Paris Masters, Norrie defeated Federico Delbonis for his 100th career win. He next defeated Reilly Opelka before falling to Taylor Fritz in the third round. Norrie's performance during the season earned him the second alternate spot at the ATP Finals. He entered the tournament as an alternate for Stefanos Tsitsipas after both Matteo Berrettini and Tsitsipas withdrew due to injuries. He played Casper Ruud and Novak Djokovic as part of the Green Group, but was defeated in both matches.

=== 2022: Wimbledon semifinal, Top 10 ===
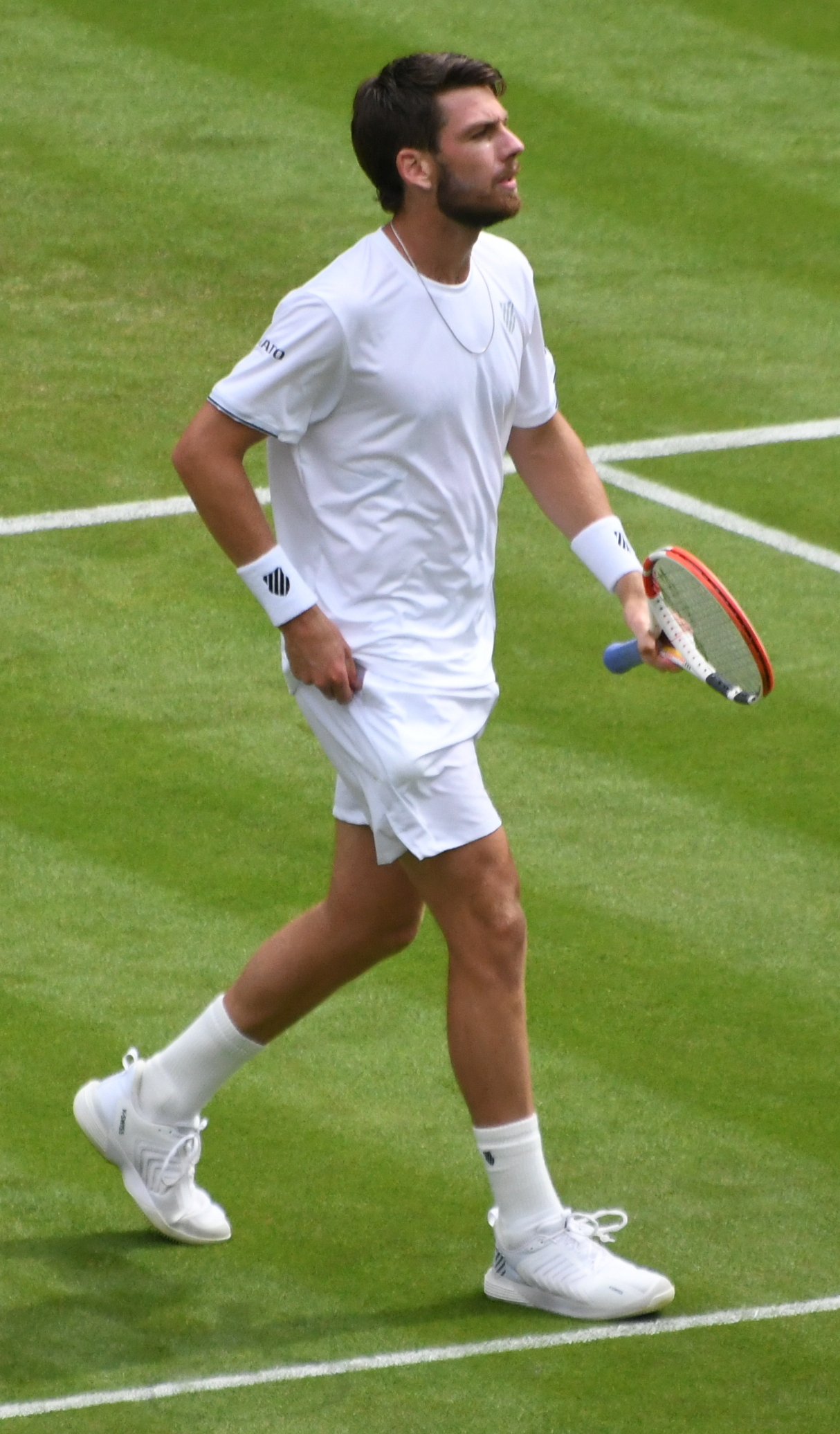
Norrie at the 2022 Wimbledon Championships

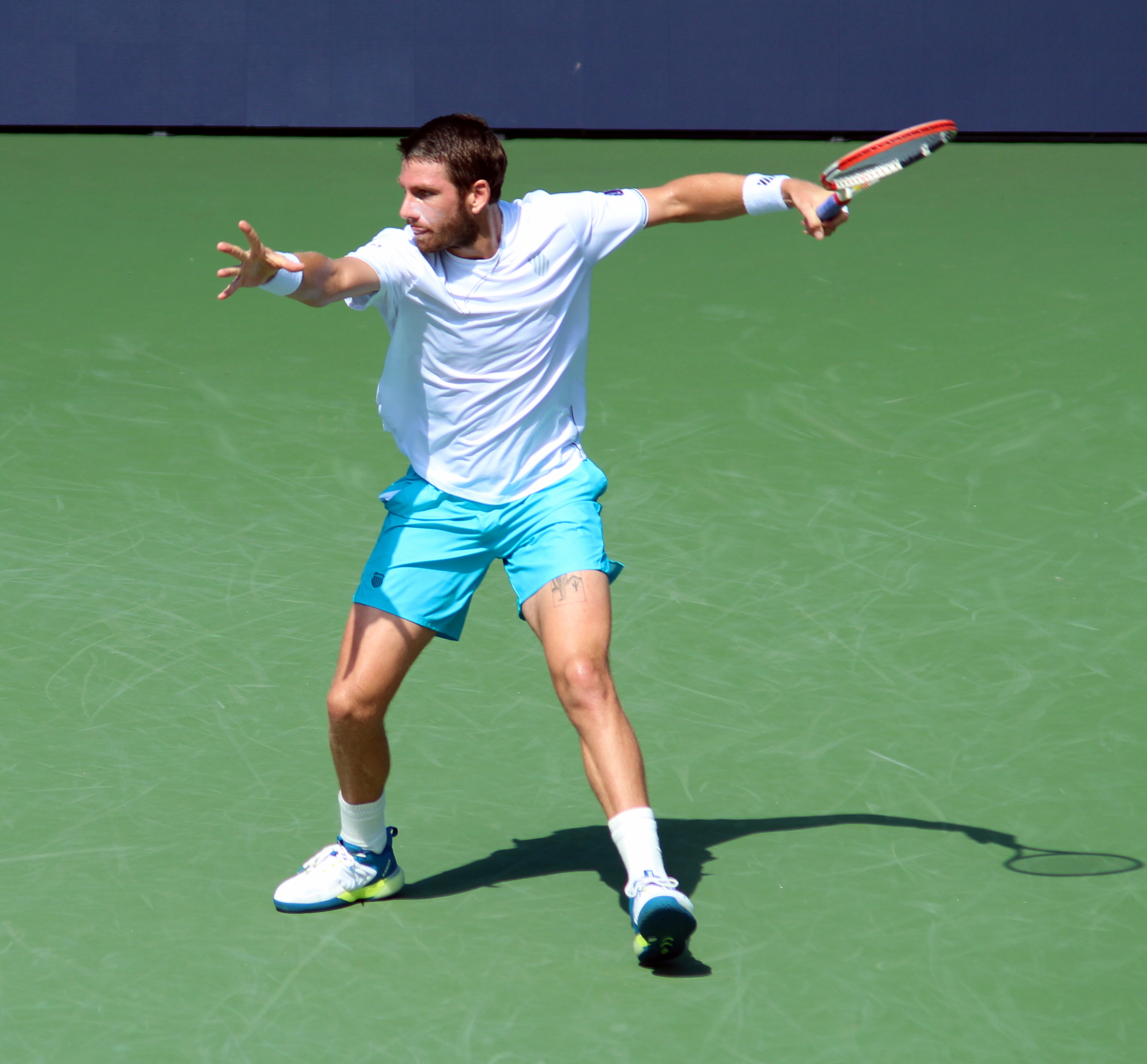
Cameron Norrie at Western & Southern Open in 2022

At the Delray Beach Open, Norrie dropped just one set en route to his third career singles title, defeating Reilly Opelka in the final.

Norrie reached his ninth ATP final in Acapulco, beating Daniel Altmaier, John Isner, Peter Gojowczyk and world No. 4 Stefanos Tsitsipas en route. He lost to world No. 5 Rafael Nadal 6–4 6–4 in the final.

Norrie then entered Indian Wells as the defending champion. He defeated Nikoloz Basilashvili in the third round in a rematch of the previous year's final, and then eliminated Jenson Brooksby to reach the quarterfinals. There, he lost to 18-year-old Carlos Alcaraz in straight sets.

The following week at the Miami Open, Norrie lost in the fourth round to Casper Ruud. Following the tournament, Norrie ascended into the top 10 of the rankings for the first time on 4 April 2022.

Norrie won his fourth title in Lyon, beating Francisco Cerúndolo in straight sets, then Sebastián Báez, Holger Rune and Alex Molčan in three sets becoming the fifth player to win multiple tour-level titles in 2022. At the French Open, Norrie lost in the third round to Karen Khachanov in four sets.

At Wimbledon he defeated Spaniards Pablo Andújar and Jaume Munar before reaching the fourth round in a major for the first time in his career, by beating Steve Johnson in three sets. Another three set win, over Tommy Paul, saw him through to the quarterfinals, after which he secured a place in the semifinals by defeating David Goffin in five sets. He lost to the top seed and eventual champion Novak Djokovic in four sets after being a set up.

Norrie lost in the third round to Félix Auger-Aliassime at the Canadian Open. At the Western & Southern Open he lost in the semifinals to Borna Ćorić. At the US Open, Norrie lost in the fourth round to Andrey Rublev in straight sets.

In September, he made his Laver Cup debut, losing his only match to Taylor Fritz in a deciding champions tiebreak.

=== 2023: Rio title and two Top-2 wins ===
Norrie started the season at the United Cup with two top-10 wins where he defeated world No. 2 Rafael Nadal and world No. 9 Taylor Fritz. Next he reached his 12th final at the ASB Classic where he lost to Richard Gasquet. At the Australian Open, Norrie lost in the third round to Jiri Lehecka in a five set match.

In February, during the Golden Swing Norrie reached his second final of the season at the Argentina Open where he lost to top seed Carlos Alcaraz. Norrie made his second back to back final and his third of the year at the Rio Open where he avenged his Argentina loss by defeating defending champion, top seed and world No. 2 Carlos Alcaraz in three sets.

At the Indian Wells Open, Norrie reached the quarterfinals after defeating sixth seed Andrey Rublev in the third round. Next he lost in straight sets to 14th seed Frances Tiafoe. In Miami, Norrie lost in the second round to Grégoire Barrère after receiving a first-round bye.

Seeking to defend his title and seeded second at the Lyon Open, Norrie recorded wins over David Goffin and Sebastian Baez, before losing in the semifinals to fourth seed Francisco Cerundolo. He went out in the third round at the French Open to 17th seed Lorenzo Musetti.

Moving onto the grass-court season, Norrie made the quarterfinals at Queens, defeating Miomir Kecmanović and Jordan Thompson, before losing to Sebastian Korda. He reached the Wimbledon second round where he was eliminated by Christopher Eubanks.

Seeded 16th, Norrie lost in the third round at the US Open to Matteo Arnaldi. He reached the quarterfinals at the Zhuhai Challenger with a win over qualifier Marc Polmans but lost in the last eight to Aslan Karatsev.

=== 2024: Australian fourth round, 200th win, injury, 15th ATP final ===
Norrie recorded his 200th career win at the Barcelona Open over wildcard Roberto Bautista Agut to reach the quarterfinals, becoming the eighth British man to reach the milestone in the Open Era. He reached the third round at Wimbledon, defeating Jack Draper in the second round in straight sets, before losing to fourth seed Alexander Zverev.

In July, Norrie pulled out just hours before his first round match at the 2024 Paris Olympics was set to start due to a forearm injury which subsequently caused him to miss the entire North American hardcourt swing of the season including withdrawing from the US Open. He also missed the Davis Cup group stage held in Manchester, England, in September.

Norrie made his return to the ATP Tour at the Stockholm Open in October, but lost his first match in straight sets to Miomir Kecmanović. He also lost in the first rounds in Vienna to Frances Tiafoe and at the ATP 1000 in Paris to Quentin Halys, increasing his losing streak to three. The following month Norrie got his first tour-level win since July by defeating Roberto Carballés Baena in three sets in the first round at the Moselle Open. He then overcame lucky loser Luca Van Assche and Zizou Bergs to reach his 25th ATP Tour semifinal. In the last four, Norrie defeated Corentin Moutet to make it through to his 15th ATP Tour final and first since the 2023 Rio Open. He lost the final to qualifier Benjamin Bonzi in straight sets. Despite the defeat, Norrie returned to the world's top 50 on 11 November 2024.

=== 2025: Roland Garros fourth round, Wimbledon quarterfinal, win over world No. 1 ===
Norrie began his 2025 season at the Hong Kong Open, where he reached the quarterfinals with wins over Learner Tien and Lorenzo Sonego. He lost in the last eight to wildcard entrant Kei Nishikori in three sets. The following week, during his first round loss to Facundo Díaz Acosta at the Auckland Classic, Norrie threw his racquet into the crowd and hit a female spectator. She was unhurt and he was given a code violation warning by the umpire but avoided disqualification. At the Australian Open, Norrie lost in the first round to Matteo Berrettini.

Having withdrawn from the Great Britain squad for their Davis Cup match against Japan due to illness, Norrie returned to action at the Dallas Open and defeated seventh seed Alex Michelsen to reach the second round, where he lost to wildcard entrant Reilly Opelka. The following week, at the Delray Beach Open, he overcame qualifier Zachary Svajda and ninth seed Arthur Rinderknech to make it through to the quarterfinals, at which point his run was ended by third seed Alex Michelsen.

In March at Indian Wells, Norrie defeated Luca Nardi and 23rd seed Jiří Lehečka to make it through to the third round, where he lost to 10th seed Tommy Paul.

At the Madrid Open, he reached the third round with wins over Martín Landaluce and 26th seed Jiří Lehečka, before his run was ended by Gabriel Diallo.

Having lost in qualifying, Norrie gained entry into the Italian Open as a lucky loser and defeated Christopher O'Connell in the first round, before losing his next match to 10th seed Daniil Medvedev. He qualified for the Geneva Open and overcame wildcard entrant Dominic Stricker, before progressing to the quarterfinals when his second round opponent, third seed Tomáš Macháč, retired injured in the deciding set of their match. In the last eight, he defeated fifth seed Alexei Popyrin. Norrie lost in the semifinals to second seed Novak Djokovic in three sets.

At the French Open, Norrie defeated 11th seed Daniil Medvedev in five sets in the first round. He then overcame Federico Agustín Gómez and Jacob Fearnley. to reach the fourth round, where he lost to sixth seed Novak Djokovic for the second successive tournament.

Wins over Roberto Bautista Agut, 12th seed Frances Tiafoe, Mattia Bellucci and qualifier Nicolás Jarry saw Norrie make it through to the quarterfinals at Wimbledon. He lost in the last eight to defending champion and second seed Carlos Alcaraz in straight sets.

Moving onto the North American hard-court swing of the season, Norrie defeated qualifier Billy Harris and second seed Lorenzo Musetti to make it through to the third round at the Washington Open, where he lost to 14th seed Brandon Nakashima. In the first round at the US Open, Norrie won the opening two sets against Sebastian Korda before his opponent retired due to a back injury. Next he defeated Francisco Comesaña in four sets to reach the third round, where he lost to seventh seed Novak Djokovic.

At the Paris Masters, having overcome Sebastián Báez in his opening match, Norrie earned his first win over a world No. 1, defeating Carlos Alcaraz in the second round in three sets. He lost in the third round to wildcard entrant Valentin Vacherot in straight sets.

Seeded seventh at the Moselle Open, Norrie defeated Valentin Royer, Arthur Cazaux lucky loser Kyrian Jacquet and Lorenzo Sonego, with all the matches going to three sets, to reach the final for the second year in succession. In another repeat of 12 months earlier, he lost the final, this time to Learner Tien, with the match going to a deciding third set tiebreak.

=== 2026: Los Cabos semifinal, Indian Wells quarterfinal ===
Seeded 26th, Norrie defeated Benjamin Bonzi and Emilio Nava to reach the third round at the Australian Open, at which point he lost to third seed Alexander Zverev in four sets.

In March at the ATP Masters tournament in Indian Wells, he received a bye in the opening round due to being 27th seed and then recorded straight sets wins over qualifier Mackenzie McDonald, sixth seed Alex de Minaur and qualifier Rinky Hijikata to make it through to the quarterfinals. Norrie lost to top seed Carlos Alcaraz in the last eight.

Norrie began the European clay court swing of the season at the Monte-Carlo Masters, defeating Miomir Kecmanović, before losing to fifth seed Alex de Minaur in the second round. Seeded seventh at the Barcelona Open, he overcame wildcard entrant Stan Wawrinka and qualifier Ethan Quinn to make it through to the quarterfinals, at which point he lost to Rafael Jódar. At the Madrid Open, Norrie received a bye as 19th seed and then registered wins over Tomáš Macháč and Thiago Agustín Tirante to reach the fourth round, where he lost to world No. 1 Jannik Sinner. Seeded 20th at the French Open, he retired due to a rib injury during the second set of his first round match against Daniel Vallejo.

He made his return to the Tour at the Queen's Club Championships. Norrie partnered Alex de Minaur in the doubles but lost to Yuki Bhambri and Michael Venus in the first round, before being eliminated in the singles opening round by fourth seed Alejandro Davidovich Fokina the next day. Seeded 26th at Wimbledon, he lost in the first round to qualifier Michael Zheng in a fifth set tiebreaker.

Norrie began the North American hard-court swing of the season at the Los Cabos Open, where he defeated Aleksandar Kovacevic, James Duckworth and Bernard Tomic to reach the semifinals, where he lost to eighth seed and defending champion Denis Shapovalov. At the Canadian Open, he recorded wins over Camilo Ugo Carabelli, 29th seed Ignacio Buse and third seed Alex de Minaur, before losing to 18th seed Arthur Fils in the fourth round. Norrie defeated Dino Prižmić at the Cincinnati Open to make it into the second round, at which point he lost to top seed Alexander Zverev. Seeded 29th at the US Open, he lost to Luca Van Assche in the first round.

Norrie withdrew from the Great Britain squad for their Davis Cup Qualifier against Ecuador due to an arm injury sustained in a practice session leading up to the tie at the Copper Box Arena in London. He was then eliminated in the first round at his next three tournaments, losing to top seed Alexander Zverev at the China Open, qualifier Dalibor Svrčina at the Shanghai Masters and Benjamin Bonzi at the Lyon Open. Norrie finally broke his losing run with a win over Francisco Cerúndolo at the Vienna Open, before losing in the second round to world No. 5 Daniil Medvedev in a match where he failed to covert a match point and which was ultimately decided in a third set tiebreak. The following week at the Paris Masters, he defeated Matteo Arnaldi, but lost to third seed Ben Shelton in the second round. At his final individual event of the year, the Stockholm Open, Norrie overcame James Duckworth, before losing to top seed Taylor Fritz in the second round.

== Davis Cup ==
In 2018, Norrie won his debut Davis Cup match in Spain against world No. 23 Roberto Bautista Agut, despite only turning professional eight months previously, and last playing on clay in 2013. Norrie, ranked No. 114, came from two sets down, in what former Davis Cup captain John Lloyd said was "one of the most impressive debuts of all time".

== Playing style and coaching ==
Norrie is a counter-puncher with consistent but unorthodox ground-strokes. The vast difference in style between his ground-stroke swings is unique where he hits a heavy topspin forehand with a long back-swing in contrast to the short take-back on his flat backhand.

Norrie's strength lies in his rally tolerance and ability to neutralise pace and spin of his opponents' shots with good court positioning and speed. He lacks the raw power of many contemporary players, but excels at constructing points and frustrating opponents with consistent retrieval and injections of pace midway through rallies. Additionally, he possesses a solid net game and occasionally serve-and-volleys. Norrie's defensive capabilities have particularly garnered attention following his disclosure of his abnormally strong cardiovascular fitness and large lung capacity.

Norrie has had several different coaches. David Roditi (2014–2017), Devin Bowen (2014–2017), and since 2017 both James Trotman and Facundo Lugones.

== Personal life ==
After turning professional in 2017, Norrie was based in Putney, southwest London, close to Wimbledon. When the Indian Wells Masters was cancelled in March 2020 at the beginning of the pandemic lock-downs, Norrie decided to fly to New Zealand to live with his parents for the rest of the year.

In 2022, Norrie moved his primary residency to Monaco.

Norrie is a supporter of the South Sydney Rabbitohs, the New Zealand national rugby union team, and Newcastle United F.C.

Norrie has poliosis, resulting in natural white streaks in his hair appearing from age 21.

== Career statistics ==
=== Grand Slam tournament performance timeline ===
Key
W	F	SF	QF	#R	RR	Q#	P#	DNQ	A	Z#	PO	G	S	B	NMS	NTI	P	NH

(W) winner; (F) finalist; (SF) semifinalist; (QF) quarterfinalist; (#R) rounds 4, 3, 2, 1; (RR) round-robin stage; (Q#) qualification round; (P#) preliminary round; (DNQ) did not qualify; (A) absent; (Z#) Davis/Fed Cup Zonal Group (with number indication) or (PO) play-off; (G) gold, (S) silver or (B) bronze Olympic/Paralympic medal; (NMS) not a Masters tournament; (NTI) not a Tier I tournament; (P) postponed; (NH) not held; (SR) strike rate (events won / competed); (W–L) win–loss record.
To avoid confusion and double counting, these charts are updated at the conclusion of a tournament or when the player's participation has ended.

Tournament	2014	2015	2016	2017	2018	2019	2020	2021	2022	2023	2024	2025	2026	SR	W–L	win %
Australian Open	A	A	A	A	Q2	1R	1R	3R	1R	3R	4R	1R	3R	0 / 8	9–8	53%
French Open	A	A	A	A	2R	1R	1R	3R	3R	3R	1R	4R	1R	0 / 9	10–9	53%
Wimbledon	A	A	A	1R	1R	2R	NH	3R	SF	2R	3R	QF	1R	0 / 8	15–9	65%
US Open	A	A	A	2R	2R	1R	3R	1R	4R	3R	A	3R	1R	0 / 9	11–9	55%
Win–loss	0–0	0–0	0–0	1–2	2–3	1–4	2–3	6–4	10–4	7–4	5–3	9–4	2–4	0 / 34	45–34	57%

=== ATP 1000 tournaments ===
==== Singles: 1 (title) ====
Result	Year	Tournament	Surface	Opponent	Score
Win	2021	Indian Wells Open	Hard	(Georgia (country)) Nikoloz Basilashvili	3–6, 6–4, 6–1
