= John Anthony Parsons =

British sports journalist and author (1938–2004)

- Born: 20 February 1938; Oxford
- Died: 26 April 2004 (aged 66); Miami
- Occupations: sports commentator, author

John Anthony Parsons (20 February 1938 – 26 April 2004) was a British sports journalist and author.

== Life ==
John was born the son of Les Parsons and his wife Marion in Oxford on 20 February 1938. His father had been president of the Lawn Tennis Association for the Oxford area.

As a schoolboy at Magdalen College School, Parsons was a member of the tennis team. At the age of 14, he began writing football match reports for the Oxford Mail. After leaving school in 1956, he took a job as a reporter on general topics at the paper. In 1964 he moved to the Daily Mail.

In January 1981, Parsons came to the Daily Telegraph and succeeded Lance Tingay as tennis correspondent. In 2001, he retired from full-time work but continued to cover major events for the paper. Beside his journalistic work, he published numerous books including The Ultimate Encyclopedia of Tennis (1998) and the Official Wimbledon Annual every year.

Parsons was born with only one functioning kidney. He received a kidney transplant in 1982 after his only kidney had been injured by a soldier during a military coup in Nigeria in 1975. While reporting from the NASDAQ-100 Open at Miami in March 2004, he suffered an acute kidney failure and was brought to Mercy Hospital. He died there a month later. He was unmarried and survived by his parents and his sister Heather Nason.
