= Neil Harman =

British journalist (born 1957)

- Born: 9 April 1957 (age 68)
- Occupations: Journalist; author
- Known for: The Times tennis correspondent

Neil Harman (born 9 April 1957) is the former chief football writer of the Daily Mail [1990-97] and tennis correspondent for the Mail, Today, the Sunday Telegraph and The Times [2002-2014]

== Career ==
=== Journalist ===
Harman started his career in journalism at the age of 16 at the Evening Echo (Southend) and later worked for the Birmingham Evening Mail. He joined the Daily Mail in its Manchester office in 1981, was appointed tennis correspondent in 1986 following a brief stint on the fledgling 'Today' newspaper, and became the Mail's football correspondent in 1990, spending seven years in the role before departing the paper after 16 years' service in 1997. In 2002, he was appointed tennis correspondent for The Times. In 2007, he became the first tennis journalist to be awarded the Sports Journalists' Association's "Sports News Reporter of the Year" award and was twice highly commended in the Specialist Correspondent category. Harman was also the recipient of the ATP's Ron Bookman Award for Media Excellence in 2005 and is a past chairman of the Lawn Tennis Writers' Association and a former president of the International Tennis Writers Association.

Harman coined the term "Spice Boys" in a Daily Mail piece published in March 1997 to describe a group of high-profile footballers playing for Liverpool F.C. in the mid-to-late 1990s.

=== Author ===
From 2004 to 2014, Harman wrote the Wimbledon Annual: the official publication of the Grand Slam tournament. Harman co-wrote the Davis Cup The Year in Tennis publication until 2006.

In 1999, Harman published an account of the rivalry between Tim Henman and Greg Rusedski over the preceding year. With David Beckham, he wrote Beckham's official biography. Harman has also written Court Confidential, an 'insider' account of the tennis world, published in 2013. Neil assisted Andy Murray in the publication of his biography Andy Murray: Seventy-Seven: My Road to Wimbledon Glory.

In 2017, in association with the famed gambler, Harry Findlay, Harman wrote Gambling For Life. The book received terrific notices, including being nominated in the top ten sports books of the year by the Sunday Times. Across 2019/2020, he spent a year with Wycombe Wanderers of League One to chronicle their season which, interrupted by the pandemic and the cessation of the Football League programme, ended with an extraordinary promotion for the club to the Championship for the first time. The book - entitled Close Quarters - received critical acclaim.

In 2022, he wrote All My Own Words, the story of his own varied and controversial life, described by one reviewer as 'a brave, beautifully crafted story of a career which should be the base for anyone setting out with the idea of a lifetime in sports writing.'

=== Plagiarism ===
In July 2014, it was revealed that Harman had plagiarised material for the official Wimbledon yearbook, which he had written since 2004, in the editions of 2011 through to 2013. He was asked to step down from the role in early 2014. Ben Rothenberg of the online Slate magazine identified dozens of apparent examples of plagiarism.

Harman admitted the allegation and subsequently resigned from the International Tennis Writers Association. Harman was suspended from The Times in late July 2014. He was dismissed from his role in October 2014.

== Personal ==
In May 2023, Harman suffered a near fatal hemorrhagic stroke and spent four months in hospital. His latest book Brushes With A Stroke was published in June 2025.
