= Facundo Lugones =

Argentine tennis coach (born 1992)

- Country (sports): Argentina
- Residence: Adrogué, Argentina
- Born: 6 July 1992 (age 33); Buenos Aires, Argentina
- College: Texas Christian University

Coaching career (2015–)
- Cameron Norrie (2017–)

Coaching achievements
- Coachee singles titles total: 3
- List of notable tournaments (with champion) Singles: 2021 — Los Cabos, Indian Wells, 2022 — Delray Beach, Lyon (Norrie); Doubles: 2018 — Estoril (Norrie)

Coaching awards and records
- Awards 2021 ATP Coach of the Year
- Last updated on: 5 April 2022.

Facundo Lugones (born 6 July 1992) is an Argentine tennis coach since 2015.

== Coaching career ==
He has worked full-time with Cameron Norrie since 2017, helping him reach a career-high ranking of World No. 8. Lugones and Norrie met while at Texas Christian University; they were teammates on the Horned Frogs, the university's tennis team, in Lugones' final year. Lugones was chosen by his peers as Coach of the Year in the 2021 ATP Awards.

As a player, Lugones lost to Paul Capdeville in the qualifying first round at the 2011 Argentina Open, in his only appearance in an ATP (main or qualifying) draw.

== Personal info ==
Former professional tennis player Christian Miniussi is his uncle.

Awards and achievements
Preceded by (Spain) Fernando Vicente	ATP Coach of the Year; 2021	Succeeded by (Spain) Juan Carlos Ferrero
