= Flat (tennis) =

Tennis technique

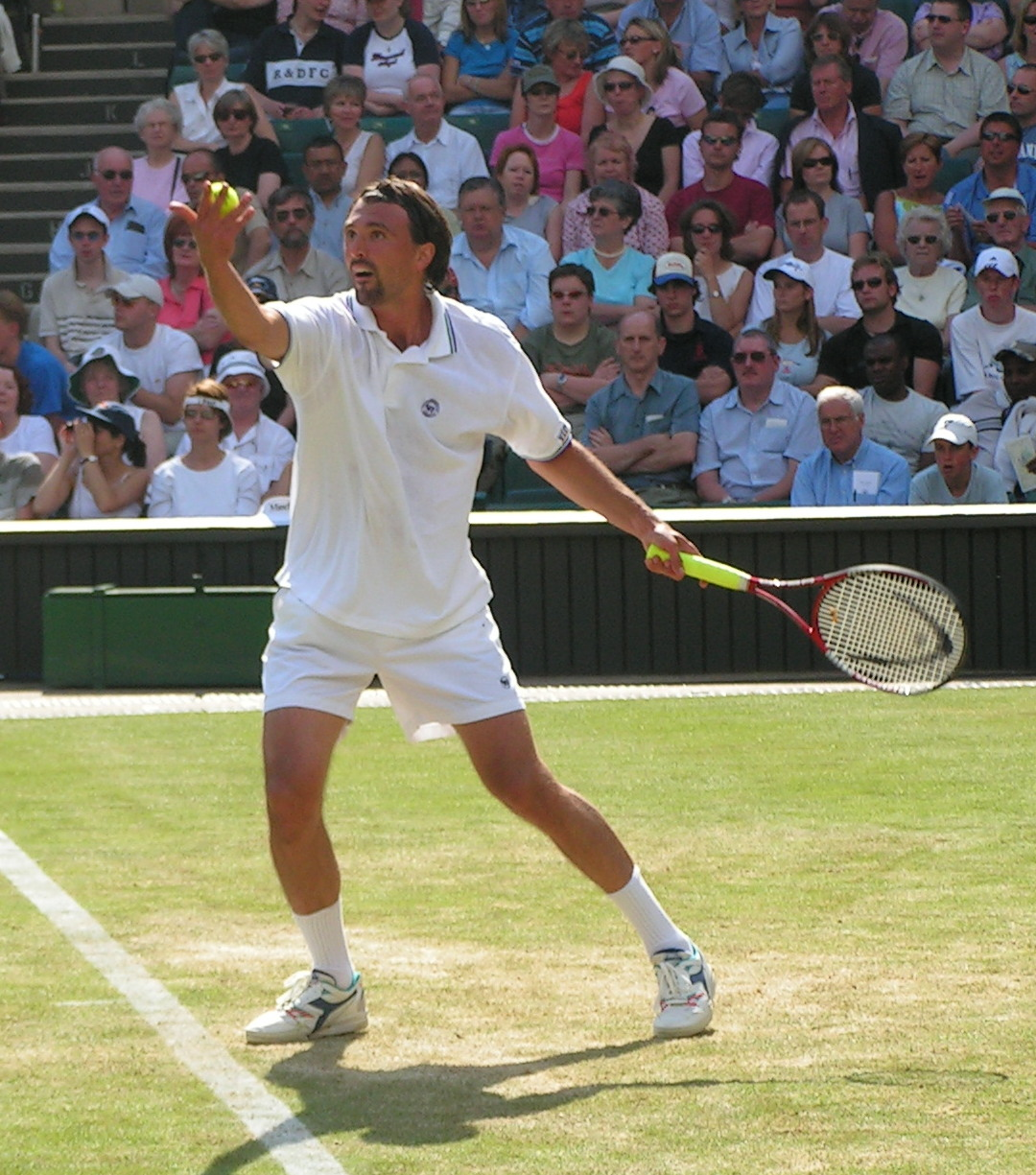
Goran Ivanišević prepares to serve in Wimbledon in 2004. Ivanišević is considered to have one of the greatest serves in tennis history.

A flat shot in tennis is made by striking the ball at a neutral level. Unlike the backspin and topspin the ball is hit with a swipe at neutral level. This effect is created by driving through the ball to push it forward rather than brushing up or down the back creating spin. The shot is commonly used for power and helps quicken the pace on the ball during play.

== Uses of the Flat Shot ==
Flat shots have many applications in tennis, particularly on the serve.

The flat serve is most often used for a first serve, due to its speed and little room for error. Most flat serves fly straight through the air and bounce relatively medium-low in comparison to other types of serves. They are characterized by their speed and placement. A good flat serve should be aimed along the center of the court, where the net is lowest, in order to maximize chances of landing the serve. Although the placement of this serve is generally the same, its speed at arrival is often used to generate aces or service winners. Many professional players utilize strong flat serves, such as Robin Söderling and Andy Roddick.

== Advantages of the Flat Shot ==
- Power
- Good for tricking opponents that expect other shots
- More force gives less time for opponent to react

== Disadvantages of the Flat Shot ==
- Smaller margin for error
- Little to no spin
- Gives little time for player to get set-up
- Requires skill
- Requires adequate ability to hit with power

== Some of the notable players who usually use flat groundstrokes ==
- Chris Evert
- Monica Seles
- Serena Williams (Although she currently employs more variety of spins in her shots, at the beginning of her career she was a master of flattening out her shots and is still near the top when it comes to this ability)
- Maria Sharapova
- Venus Williams
- Petra Kvitová
- Andy Roddick
- Fernando González
- Ivo Karlović
- James Blake
- Jimmy Connors
- Miloslav Mečíř
- Nikolay Davydenko
- Robin Söderling
- Andy Murray
- Tomáš Berdych
- Lukáš Rosol
- Roger Federer (More so at the beginning of his career, possessed the remarkable ability to flatten out his shots with extreme precision. Near this point in his career he hits with spin much more frequently)
- Novak Djokovic (More so at the beginning of his career. At this point in his career he hits his forehand with much more spin)
- Karolína Plíšková
