= Russ Adams (photographer) =

American photographer (1930–2017)

Russ Adams (July 30, 1930 – June 28, 2017) was an American photographer. He was called by his peers the "dean" of modern tennis photography. In a Boston Globe profile (July 12, 2007) of Russ Adams regarding his July 2007 induction into the International Tennis Hall of Fame in Newport, Rhode Island, Billie Jean King stated: "Russ is a national treasure. He's our dean, our guru, our guardian. Believe me, the players look for him and love him."

He covered the sport for 50 years and created associated tennis photography rules. He was inducted into the International Tennis Hall of Fame in Newport, Rhode Island in July 2007 along with players Pete Sampras, Arantxa Sánchez Vicario, and Sven Davidson.

Adams photographed Grand Slam Tournaments, the World Championship Tour (WCT), all major United States Tennis Association (USTA) tournaments, Fed Cup, Davis Cup, and tennis at the Olympic Games. He credited learning tennis photographer from 17-time Grand Slam Champion, Hazel Wightman, at Longwood Cricket Club in Chestnut Hill, Massachusetts, where Wightman was a member.

In 1967, he became the official (volunteer) photographer of the U.S. National Championship at Forest Hills. At the birth of Open Tennis he developed and implemented the system for on-court photographers at the 1969 U.S. Open Championship in tandem with the tournament director Bill Talbert. He served as director/liaison of photographers for the U.S. Open, and was instrumental in developing the universal "Code of Conduct" in conjunction with the Professional Tennis Council to be used by photographers covering tennis events around the world. He was a founding member of the International Tennis Federation Media Commission and served on the Board for 17 years.

Adams's collection of tennis images was considered the largest privately held source of images in the tennis world. "His portfolio of photos is probably the most comprehensive volume chronicling the game of tennis from its professional infancy," stated fellow Hall of Famer Jim Courier in a Northeast Tennis Magazine (Summer 2007) cover profile of Adams.

Adams died on June 28, 2017, at age 86.

== Awards ==
Year	Award
1955	Nominated for a Pulitzer Prize
1976	ATP (Association for Tennis Professionals) Special Award
1984	ATP Distinguished Service Award
1991	ATP Ron Bookman Media Execellence Award
1993	New York Press Photographers Appreciation Award
2001	ITF Award for Service to the Game
2002	USTA Media Excellence Lifetime Achievement Award
2007	Inducted into the International Tennis Hall of Fame
