= 2022 Astana Open – Singles =

Singles
- 2022 Astana Open

Final
- Champion: (Serbia) Novak Djokovic
- Runner-up: (Greece) Stefanos Tsitsipas
- Score: 6–3, 6–4

Details
- Draw: 32
- Seeds: 8

Events
Singles	Doubles
← 2021 ·	Astana Open	· 2023 →

Novak Djokovic defeated Stefanos Tsitsipas in the final, 6–3, 6–4 to win the singles tennis title at the 2022 Astana Open. It was his 90th ATP Tour-level singles title.

Kwon Soon-woo was the reigning champion, but chose to compete in Tokyo instead.

== Seeds ==
1. (Spain) Carlos Alcaraz (first round)
2. Daniil Medvedev (semifinals, retired)
3. (Greece) Stefanos Tsitsipas (final)
4. (Serbia) Novak Djokovic (champion)
5. Andrey Rublev (semifinals)
6. (Italy) Jannik Sinner (withdrew)
7. (Poland) Hubert Hurkacz (quarterfinals)
8. (Canada) Félix Auger-Aliassime (first round)
9. (Croatia) Marin Čilić (second round)

== Draw ==
=== Key ===
- Q = Qualifier
- WC = Wild card
- LL = Lucky loser
- Alt = Alternate
- ITF = ITF entry
- PR = Protected ranking
- SR = Special ranking
- SE = Special exempt
- JE = Junior exempt
- JR = Junior Accelerator Programme entrant
- CO = College Accelerator Programme entrant
- NG = Next Gen Accelerator Program entrant
- w/o = Walkover
- r = Retired
- d = Defaulted

=== Finals ===
Semifinals
5	Andrey Rublev	6	4	3
3	(Greece) Stefanos Tsitsipas	4	6	6
4/WC	(Serbia) Novak Djokovic	4	7^{8}	0
2	Daniil Medvedev	6	6^{6}	0^{r}

Final
3	(Greece) Stefanos Tsitsipas	3	4
4/WC	(Serbia) Novak Djokovic	6	6

=== Top half ===
First round
1	(Spain) C Alcaraz	5	3
LL	(Belgium) D Goffin	7	6
(France) A Mannarino	1	6	6
WC	(Switzerland) S Wawrinka	6	2	3
Q	(China) Z Zhang	4	6	6
A Karatsev	6	4	1
Q	(Serbia) L Djere	4	3
5	A Rublev	6	6
3	(Greece) S Tsitsipas	6	6
WC	(Kazakhstan) M Kukushkin	3	4
Q	A Shevchenko	6^{4}	2
Q	(Italy) L Nardi	7^{7}	6
(Netherlands) T Griekspoor	0	6	3
(Kazakhstan) A Bublik	6	4	6
(Argentina) F Cerúndolo	2	6^{2}
7	(Poland) H Hurkacz	6	7^{7}

Second round
LL	(Belgium) D Goffin	6	1	5
(France) A Mannarino	3	6	7
Q	(China) Z Zhang	3	2
5	A Rublev	6	6
3	(Greece) S Tsitsipas	7^{7}	7^{7}
Q	(Italy) L Nardi	6^{2}	6^{3}
(Kazakhstan) A Bublik	4	4
7	(Poland) H Hurkacz	6	6

Quarterfinals
(France) A Mannarino	1	2
5	A Rublev	6	6
3	(Greece) S Tsitsipas	7^{10}	6
7	(Poland) H Hurkacz	6^{8}	3

Semifinals
5	A Rublev	6	4	3
3	(Greece) S Tsitsipas	4	6	6

=== Bottom half ===
First round
9	(Croatia) M Čilić	5	7^{7}	6
(Germany) O Otte	7	6^{4}	2
(United States) M Cressy	4	6^{3}
K Khachanov	6	7^{7}
(Netherlands) B van de Zandschulp	6	6
WC	(Kazakhstan) B Zhukayev	1	1
(Chile) C Garín	1	1
4/WC	(Serbia) N Djokovic	6	6
8	(Canada) F Auger-Aliassime	4	6^{6}
(Spain) R Bautista Agut	6	7^{8}
LL	P Kotov	6	6
(Spain) A Davidovich Fokina	4	4
SE	(Switzerland) M-A Hüsler	0	2
(Finland) E Ruusuvuori	6	6
(Spain) A Ramos Viñolas	3	1
2	D Medvedev	6	6

Second round
9	(Croatia) M Čilić	6	3	3
K Khachanov	2	6	6
(Netherlands) B van de Zandschulp	3	1
4/WC	(Serbia) N Djokovic	6	6
(Spain) R Bautista Agut	6	7^{7}
LL	P Kotov	1	6^{5}
(Finland) E Ruusuvuori	3	2
2	D Medvedev	6	6

Quarterfinals
K Khachanov	4	3
4/WC	(Serbia) N Djokovic	6	6
(Spain) R Bautista Agut	1	1
2	D Medvedev	6	6

Semifinals
4/WC	(Serbia) N Djokovic	4	7^{8}	0
2	D Medvedev	6	6^{6}	0^{r}

== Qualifying ==
=== Seeds ===
1. (Belgium) David Goffin (qualifying competition, lucky loser)
2. (Colombia) Daniel Elahi Galán (first round)
3. (Serbia) Laslo Đere (qualified)
4. Pavel Kotov (qualifying competition, lucky loser)
5. (China) Zhang Zhizhen (qualified)
6. Alexander Shevchenko (qualified)
7. (Italy) Luca Nardi (qualified)
8. (Turkey) Altuğ Çelikbilek (qualifying competition)

=== Qualifiers ===
1. (Italy) Luca Nardi
2. (China) Zhang Zhizhen
3. (Serbia) Laslo Đere
4. Alexander Shevchenko

=== Lucky losers ===
1. Pavel Kotov
2. (Belgium) David Goffin

=== Qualifying draw ===
==== First qualifier ====
First round
1	(Belgium) David Goffin	6	6
(Kazakhstan) Denis Yevseyev	1	4
WC	(Serbia) Hamad Međedović	1	3
7	(Italy) Luca Nardi	6	6

Qualifying competition
1	(Belgium) David Goffin	6	6^{3}	6^{2}
7	(Italy) Luca Nardi	3	7^{7}	7^{7}

==== Second qualifier ====
First round
2	(Colombia) Daniel Elahi Galán	7	6^{0}	2
WC	(Kazakhstan) Aleksandr Nedovyesov	5	7^{7}	6
(Turkey) Cem İlkel	7^{10}	2	1
5	(China) Zhang Zhizhen	6^{8}	6	6

Qualifying competition
WC	(Kazakhstan) Aleksandr Nedovyesov	6^{5}	3
5	(China) Zhang Zhizhen	7^{7}	6

==== Third qualifier ====
First round
3	(Serbia) Laslo Đere	6	6
(Uzbekistan) Denis Istomin	1	4
(Kazakhstan) Grigoriy Lomakin	3	3
8	(Turkey) Altuğ Çelikbilek	6	6

Qualifying competition
3	(Serbia) Laslo Đere	6	6
8	(Turkey) Altuğ Çelikbilek	3	4

==== Fourth qualifier ====
First round
4	Pavel Kotov	6	6
WC	(Kazakhstan) Arslanbek Aitkulov	0	0
Alt	Yan Bondarevskiy	0	0
6	Alexander Shevchenko	6	6

Qualifying competition
4	Pavel Kotov	6^{11}	3
6	Alexander Shevchenko	7^{13}	6
