= 2022 Serbia Open =

ATP tennis tournament

- Date: 18–24 April
- Edition: 6th
- Category: ATP Tour 250
- Draw: 28S / 16D
- Prize money: €534,555
- Surface: Clay / Outdoors
- Location: Belgrade, Serbia
- Venue: Novak Tennis Center

Champions

Singles
- Andrey Rublev

Doubles
- (Uruguay) Ariel Behar / (Ecuador) Gonzalo Escobar
- Serbia Open

The 2022 Serbia Open was a tennis tournament played on outdoor clay courts. It was the 6th edition of the tournament and was classified as an ATP Tour 250 event on the 2022 ATP Tour. The event took place in Belgrade, Serbia, from 18 to 24 April 2022.

== Champions ==
=== Singles ===
- Andrey Rublev def. (Serbia) Novak Djokovic, 6–2, 6–7^{(4–7)}, 6–0

=== Men's doubles ===
- (Uruguay) Ariel Behar / (Ecuador) Gonzalo Escobar def. (Croatia) Nikola Mektić / (Croatia) Mate Pavić, 6–2, 3–6, [10–7]

== Points and prize money ==
=== Point distribution ===
Event	W	F	SF	QF	Round of 16	Round of 32	Q	Q2	Q1
Singles	250	150	90	45	20	0	12	6	0
Doubles	250	150	90	45	0	—N/a	—N/a	—N/a	—N/a

=== Prize money ===
Event	W	F	SF	QF	Round of 16	Round of 32	Q2	Q1
Singles	€81,310	€47,430	€27,885	€16,160	€9,380	€5,730	€2,870	€1,565
Doubles*	€28,250	€15,110	€8,860	€4,950	€2,920	—N/a	—N/a	—N/a

_{*per team}

== Singles main draw entrants ==
=== Seeds ===
Country	Player	Rank^{1}	Seed
SRB	Novak Djokovic	1	1
	Andrey Rublev	8	2
	Karen Khachanov	24	3
	Aslan Karatsev	30	4
CHI	Cristian Garín	31	5
ITA	Fabio Fognini	32	6
SRB	Miomir Kecmanović	38	7
SRB	Filip Krajinović	39	8

- ^{1} Rankings are as of 11 April 2022

=== Other entrants ===
The following players received wildcards into the main draw:

- (Kazakhstan) Mikhail Kukushkin
- (Serbia) Hamad Međedović
- (Chile) Alejandro Tabilo

The following player received entry using a protected ranking into the singles main draw:

- (Slovenia) Aljaž Bedene

The following players received entry from the qualifying draw:

- (Japan) Taro Daniel
- (Czech Republic) Jiří Lehečka
- (Brazil) Thiago Monteiro
- Roman Safiullin

=== Withdrawals ===
- (France) Benjamin Bonzi → replaced by (Portugal) João Sousa
- (Croatia) Borna Ćorić → replaced by (Slovenia) Aljaž Bedene
- (France) Hugo Gaston → replaced by (Switzerland) Henri Laaksonen
- (Slovakia) Alex Molčan → replaced by (Sweden) Mikael Ymer
- (France) Gaël Monfils → replaced by (Italy) Marco Cecchinato

== Doubles main draw entrants ==
=== Seeds ===
Country	Player	Country	Player	Rank^{1}	Seed
CRO	Nikola Mektić	CRO	Mate Pavić	7	1
ITA	Simone Bolelli	ITA	Fabio Fognini	56	2
AUS	Matthew Ebden	AUS	Max Purcell	57	3
CRO	Ivan Dodig	USA	Austin Krajicek	62	4

- Rankings are as of 4 April 2022

=== Other entrants ===
The following pairs received wildcards into the doubles main draw:

- (Serbia) Hamad Međedović / (Czech Republic) Jakub Menšík
- (Serbia) Ivan Sabanov / (Serbia) Matej Sabanov

=== Withdrawals ===
Before the tournament

- (France) Benjamin Bonzi / (France) Hugo Gaston → replaced by (United Kingdom) Lloyd Glasspool / (Finland) Harri Heliövaara
