= 2022 Dubai Tennis Championships =

- Date: 14–19 February (women); 21 – 26 February (men)
- Edition: 30th (men) / 22nd (women)
- Category: ATP Tour 500 (men); WTA 500 (women)
- Draw: 32S / 16D
- Prize money: $2,949,665 (men) $703,580 (women)
- Surface: Hard, Outdoor
- Location: Dubai, United Arab Emirates
- Venue: Aviation Club Tennis Centre

Champions

Men's singles
- (Russia) Andrey Rublev

Women's singles
- (Latvia) Jeļena Ostapenko

Men's doubles
- (Germany) Tim Pütz / (New Zealand) Michael Venus

Women's doubles
- (Russia) Veronika Kudermetova / (Belgium) Elise Mertens
- Dubai Tennis Championships

The 2022 Dubai Tennis Championships (also known as the Dubai Duty Free Tennis Championships for sponsorship reasons) was an ATP 500 event on the 2022 ATP Tour and a WTA 500 tournament on the 2022 WTA Tour. Both events were held at the Aviation Club Tennis Centre in Dubai, United Arab Emirates. The women's tournament took place from February 14 to 19 and the men's tournament from February 21 to 26.

== Points and prize money ==
=== Point distribution ===
Event	W	F	SF	QF	Round of 16	Round of 32	Q	Q3	Q2	Q1
Men's singles	500	300	180	90	45	0	20	—N/a	10	0
Men's doubles	500	300	180	90	0	—N/a	45	—N/a	25	0
Women's singles	470	305	185	100	55	1	25	18	13	1
Women's doubles	470	305	185	100	55	1	—N/a	—N/a	—N/a	—N/a

=== Prize money ===
Event	W	F	SF	QF	Round of 16	Round of 32	Q3	Q2	Q1
Men's singles	$523,740	$282,300	$149,870	$76,570	$40,875	$21,800	—N/a	$11,170	$6,270
Men's doubles*	$171,670	$91,560	$46,320	$23,160	$11,720	—N/a	—N/a	—N/a	—N/a
Women's singles	$104,180	$64,800	$37,500	$17,500	$9,000	$6,200	$3,000	$2,000	$1,500
Women's doubles*	$36,200	$22,000	$12,500	$6,500	$3,900	—N/a	—N/a	—N/a	—N/a

_{*per team}

== Champions ==
=== Men's singles ===
- (Russia) Andrey Rublev def. (Czech Republic) Jiří Veselý 6–3, 6–4

=== Women's singles ===
- (Latvia) Jeļena Ostapenko def. (Russia) Veronika Kudermetova, 6–0, 6–4

=== Men's doubles ===
- (Germany) Tim Pütz / (New Zealand) Michael Venus def. (Croatia) Nikola Mektić / (Croatia) Mate Pavić, 6–3, 6–7^{(5–7)}, [16–14]

=== Women's doubles ===
- (Russia) Veronika Kudermetova / (Belgium) Elise Mertens def. (Ukraine) Lyudmyla Kichenok / (Latvia) Jeļena Ostapenko 6–1, 6–3

== ATP singles main-draw entrants ==
=== Seeds ===
Country	Player	Rank^{1}	Seed
SRB	Novak Djokovic	1	1
RUS	Andrey Rublev	7	2
~~CAN~~	~~Félix Auger-Aliassime~~	~~9~~	~~3~~
ITA	Jannik Sinner	10	4
POL	Hubert Hurkacz	11	5
CAN	Denis Shapovalov	12	6
RUS	Aslan Karatsev	15	7
ESP	Roberto Bautista Agut	16	8

- Rankings are as of February 14, 2022.

=== Other entrants ===
The following players received wildcards into the singles main draw:

- (Tunisia) Malek Jaziri
- (United Kingdom) Andy Murray
- (Italy) Lorenzo Musetti

The following players received entry from the qualifying draw:

- (Lithuania) Ričardas Berankis
- (Japan) Taro Daniel
- (Australia) Christopher O'Connell
- (Czech Republic) Jiří Veselý

The following players received entry as lucky losers:

- (Slovakia) Alex Molčan
- (Australia) Alexei Popyrin

=== Withdrawals ===
Before the tournament

- (Canada) Félix Auger-Aliassime → replaced by (Australia) Alexei Popyrin
- (Croatia) Borna Ćorić → replaced by (Germany) Jan-Lennard Struff
- (France) Gaël Monfils → replaced by (South Korea) Kwon Soon-woo
- (Netherlands) Botic van de Zandschulp → replaced by (Slovakia) Alex Molčan

== ATP doubles main-draw entrants ==
=== Seeds ===
Country	Player	Country	Player	Rank^{1}	Seed
CRO	Nikola Mektić	CRO	Mate Pavić	3	1
USA	Rajeev Ram	GBR	Joe Salisbury	7	2
AUS	John Peers	SVK	Filip Polášek	18	3
GER	Tim Pütz	NZL	Michael Venus	31	4

- Rankings are as of February 14, 2022.

=== Other entrants ===
The following pairs received wildcards into the doubles main draw:

- (United Arab Emirates) Abdulrahman Al Janahi / (United Arab Emirates) Omar Alawadhi
- (India) Saketh Myneni / (India) Ramkumar Ramanathan

The following pair received entry from the qualifying draw:

- (Kazakhstan) Alexander Bublik / (Turkey) Altuğ Çelikbilek

The following pairs received entry as lucky losers:

- (United Kingdom) Dan Evans / (United Kingdom) Ken Skupski
- (Israel) Jonathan Erlich / (Germany) Jan-Lennard Struff

=== Withdrawals ===
Before the tournament

- (Croatia) Marin Čilić / (Croatia) Ivan Dodig → replaced by (Israel) Jonathan Erlich / (Germany) Jan-Lennard Struff
- (Russia) Karen Khachanov / (Russia) Andrey Rublev → replaced by (United Kingdom) Dan Evans / (United Kingdom) Ken Skupski

== WTA singles main-draw entrants ==
=== Seeds ===
Country	Player	Ranking^{1}	Seed
BLR	Aryna Sabalenka	2	1
CZE	Barbora Krejčíková	3	2
ESP	Paula Badosa	5	3
ESP	Garbiñe Muguruza	6	4
~~GRE~~	~~Maria Sakkari~~	~~7~~	~~5~~
POL	Iga Świątek	8	6
~~EST~~	~~Anett Kontaveit~~	~~9~~	~~7~~
TUN	Ons Jabeur	10	8
USA	Danielle Collins	11	9
UKR	Elina Svitolina	15	10

- Rankings are as of February 7, 2022.

=== Other entrants ===
The following players received wildcards into the singles main draw:

- (France) Caroline Garcia
- (United States) Alison Riske
- (Egypt) Mayar Sherif
- (Russia) Vera Zvonareva

The following player received special exempts into the main draw:

- (Romania) Irina-Camelia Begu

The following players received entry from the qualifying draw:

- (Russia) Varvara Gracheva
- (Ukraine) Marta Kostyuk
- (Romania) Elena-Gabriela Ruse
- (Czech Republic) Kateřina Siniaková
- (Czech Republic) Markéta Vondroušová
- (Ukraine) Dayana Yastremska

The following players received entry as lucky losers:

- (Switzerland) Jil Teichmann
- (Australia) Ajla Tomljanović

=== Withdrawals ===
Before the tournament

- (Switzerland) Belinda Bencic → replaced by (Russia) Veronika Kudermetova
- (Germany) Angelique Kerber → replaced by (Belgium) Elise Mertens
- (Estonia) Anett Kontaveit → replaced by (Australia) Ajla Tomljanović
- (Russia) Anastasia Pavlyuchenkova → replaced by (Italy) Camila Giorgi
- (Czech Republic) Karolína Plíšková → replaced by (Latvia) Jeļena Ostapenko
- (Kazakhstan) Elena Rybakina → replaced by (United States) Danielle Collins
- (Greece) Maria Sakkari → replaced by (Switzerland) Jil Teichmann

During the tournament

- (Czech Republic) Markéta Vondroušová (right adductor injury)

=== Retirements ===
- (United States) Danielle Collins (dizziness)

== WTA doubles main-draw entrants ==
=== Seeds ===
Country	Player	Country	Player	Rank^{1}	Seed
JPN	Ena Shibahara	CHN	Zhang Shuai	12	1
RUS	Veronika Kudermetova	BEL	Elise Mertens	13	2
CHI	Alexa Guarachi	CRO	Darija Jurak Schreiber	23	3
CAN	Gabriela Dabrowski	MEX	Giuliana Olmos	28	4

- Rankings are as of February 7, 2022.

=== Other entrants ===
The following pairs received wildcards into the doubles main draw:

- (Czech Republic) Lucie Hradecká / (India) Sania Mirza
- (United Kingdom) Eden Silva / (Belgium) Kimberley Zimmermann

=== Withdrawals ===
Before the tournament

- (Chile) Alexa Guarachi / (United States) Nicole Melichar-Martinez → replaced by (Chile) Alexa Guarachi / (Croatia) Darija Jurak Schreiber
