= 2022 Dubai Tennis Championships – Men's singles =

Men's singles
- 2022 Dubai Tennis Championships

Final
- Champion: (Russia) Andrey Rublev
- Runner-up: (Czech Republic) Jiří Veselý
- Score: 6–3, 6–4

Details
- Draw: 32 (4 Q / 3 WC )
- Seeds: 8

Events
Singles	men	women
Doubles	men	women
- Dubai Tennis Championships

Andrey Rublev defeated Jiří Veselý in the final, 6–3, 6–4 to win the men's singles title at the 2022 Dubai Tennis Championships. It was Rublev's tenth career singles title. Veselý entered the tournament ranked as the world No. 123, and was the lowest-ranked finalist in the tournament's history.

Aslan Karatsev was the defending champion, but lost to Mackenzie McDonald in the first round.

This tournament marked Novak Djokovic’s first appearance of the season, as he was unable to compete at the Australian Open due to the cancellation of his visa. As a result of his quarterfinal loss to Veselý, Djokovic lost the world No. 1 ranking to Daniil Medvedev.

== Seeds ==
1. (Serbia) Novak Djokovic (quarterfinals)
2. (Russia) Andrey Rublev (champion)
3. (Canada) Félix Auger-Aliassime (withdrew)
4. (Italy) Jannik Sinner (quarterfinals)
5. (Poland) Hubert Hurkacz (semifinals)
6. (Canada) Denis Shapovalov (semifinals)
7. (Russia) Aslan Karatsev (first round)
8. (Spain) Roberto Bautista Agut (second round)

== Draw ==
Key

- Q = Qualifier
- WC = Wild card
- LL = Lucky loser
- Alt = Alternate
- ITF = ITF entry
- PR = Protected ranking
- SR = Special ranking
- SE = Special exempt
- JE = Junior exempt
- JR = Junior Accelerator Programme entrant
- CO = College Accelerator Programme entrant
- NG = Next Gen Accelerator Program entrant
- w/o = Walkover
- r = Retired
- d = Defaulted

=== Finals ===
Semifinals
Q	(Czech Republic) Jiří Veselý	6^{7}	7^{7}	7^{7}
6	(Canada) Denis Shapovalov	7^{9}	6^{2}	6^{3}
5	(Poland) Hubert Hurkacz	6	5	6^{5}
2	(Russia) Andrey Rublev	3	7	7^{7}

Final
Q	(Czech Republic) Jiří Veselý	3	4
2	(Russia) Andrey Rublev	6	6

=== Top half ===
First round
1	(Serbia) N Djokovic	6	6
WC	(Italy) L Musetti	3	3
(Russia) K Khachanov	6	6^{1}	7
(Australia) A de Minaur	3	7^{7}	5
Q	(Czech Republic) J Veselý	6	7^{7}
(Croatia) M Čilić	4	6^{3}
(France) A Rinderknech	3	4
8	(Spain) R Bautista Agut	6	6
LL	(Australia) A Popyrin	6	6
(Georgia (country)) N Basilashvili	2	3
(Germany) J-L Struff	1	6	3
Q	(Lithuania) R Berankis	6	3	6
(Belgium) D Goffin	3	6^{5}
Q	(Japan) T Daniel	6	7^{7}
(Hungary) M Fucsovics	6	4	5
6	(Canada) D Shapovalov	4	6	7

Second round
1	(Serbia) N Djokovic	6	7^{7}
(Russia) K Khachanov	3	6^{2}
Q	(Czech Republic) J Veselý	6	6
8	(Spain) R Bautista Agut	2	4
LL	(Australia) A Popyrin	4	6^{7}
Q	(Lithuania) R Berankis	6	7^{9}
Q	(Japan) T Daniel	4	3
6	(Canada) D Shapovalov	6	6

Quarterfinals
1	(Serbia) N Djokovic	4	6^{4}
Q	(Czech Republic) J Veselý	6	7^{7}
Q	(Lithuania) R Berankis	6^{4}	3
6	(Canada) D Shapovalov	7^{7}	6

Semifinals
Q	(Czech Republic) J Veselý	6^{7}	7^{7}	7^{7}
6	(Canada) D Shapovalov	7^{9}	6^{2}	6^{3}

=== Bottom half ===
First round
5	(Poland) H Hurkacz	6	6
(Kazakhstan) A Bublik	3	1
LL	(Slovakia) A Molčan	6	6
(South Africa) L Harris	3	3
WC	(United Kingdom) A Murray	6^{4}	6	7
Q	(Australia) C O'Connell	7^{7}	3	5
(Spain) A Davidovich Fokina	6	6^{6}	3
4	(Italy) J Sinner	4	7^{8}	6
7	(Russia) A Karatsev	5	3
(United States) M McDonald	7	6
(Serbia) F Krajinović	6^{4}	6	6
WC	(Tunisia) M Jaziri	7^{7}	2	4
(Belarus) I Ivashka	3	2
(South Korea) S-w Kwon	6	6
(United Kingdom) D Evans	4	5
2	(Russia) A Rublev	6	7

Second round
5	(Poland) H Hurkacz	6	6
LL	(Slovakia) A Molčan	3	2
WC	(United Kingdom) A Murray	5	2
4	(Italy) J Sinner	7	6
(United States) M McDonald	6	7^{9}
(Serbia) F Krajinović	4	6^{7}
(South Korea) S-w Kwon	6	0	3
2	(Russia) A Rublev	4	6	6

Quarterfinals
5	(Poland) H Hurkacz	6	6
4	(Italy) J Sinner	3	3
(United States) M McDonald	6	3	1
2	(Russia) A Rublev	2	6	6

Semifinals
5	(Poland) H Hurkacz	6	5	6^{5}
2	(Russia) A Rublev	3	7	7^{7}

== Qualifying ==
=== Seeds ===
1. (Australia) Alexei Popyrin (qualifying competition, lucky loser)
2. (Finland) Emil Ruusuvuori (withdrew)
3. (Slovakia) Alex Molčan (qualifying competition, lucky loser)
4. (Switzerland) Henri Laaksonen (first round)
5. (Portugal) João Sousa (first round)
6. (Lithuania) Ričardas Berankis (qualified)
7. (Japan) Taro Daniel (qualified)
8. (Czech Republic) Jiří Veselý (qualified)

=== Qualifiers ===
1. (Czech Republic) Jiří Veselý
2. (Lithuania) Ričardas Berankis
3. (Japan) Taro Daniel
4. (Australia) Christopher O'Connell

=== Lucky loser ===
1. (Australia) Alexei Popyrin
2. (Slovakia) Alex Molčan

=== Qualifying draw ===
==== First qualifier ====
First round
1	(Australia) Alexei Popyrin	7	6
(Turkey) Altuğ Çelikbilek	5	2
WC	(Lebanon) Hady Habib	1	7	3
8	(Czech Republic) Jiří Veselý	6	5	6

Qualifying competition
1	(Australia) Alexei Popyrin	6^{4}	7^{8}	2
8	(Czech Republic) Jiří Veselý	7^{7}	6^{6}	6

==== Second qualifier ====
First round
Alt	(Russia) Pavel Kotov	6	7
(Belarus) Egor Gerasimov	4	5
WC	(Spain) Carlos Gómez-Herrera	3	6	5
6	(Lithuania) Ričardas Berankis	6	4	7

Qualifying competition
Alt	(Russia) Pavel Kotov	6^{6}	7	4
6	(Lithuania) Ričardas Berankis	7^{8}	5	6

==== Third qualifier ====
First round
3	(Slovakia) Alex Molčan	7^{7}	6
WC	(Egypt) Mohamed Safwat	6^{2}	3
(Sweden) Elias Ymer	1	4
7	(Japan) Taro Daniel	6	6

Qualifying competition
3	(Slovakia) Alex Molčan	3	6^{3}
7	(Japan) Taro Daniel	6	7^{7}

==== Fourth qualifier ====
First round
4	(Switzerland) Henri Laaksonen	3	5
(Australia) Christopher O'Connell	6	7
PR	(India) Yuki Bhambri	6	3	7^{7}
5	(Portugal) João Sousa	3	6	6^{5}

Qualifying competition
(Australia) Christopher O'Connell	6	6
PR	(India) Yuki Bhambri	3	4
