= 2022 Serbia Open – Singles =

Singles
- 2022 Serbia Open

Final
- Champion: Andrey Rublev
- Runner-up: (Serbia) Novak Djokovic
- Score: 6–2, 6–7^{(4–7)}, 6–0

Details
- Draw: 28 (4 Q / 3 WC )
- Seeds: 8

Events
Singles	Doubles
← 2021 ·	Serbia Open	· 2023 →

Andrey Rublev defeated Novak Djokovic in the final, 6–2, 6–7^{(4–7)}, 6–0 to win the singles tennis title at the 2022 Serbia Open.

Matteo Berrettini was the reigning champion, but chose not to defend his title.

== Seeds ==
The top four seeds received a bye into the second round.

1. (Serbia) Novak Djokovic (final)
2. Andrey Rublev (champion)
3. Karen Khachanov (semifinals)
4. Aslan Karatsev (second round)
5. (Chile) Cristian Garín (first round)
6. (Italy) Fabio Fognini (semifinals)
7. (Serbia) Miomir Kecmanović (quarterfinals)
8. (Serbia) Filip Krajinović (second round)

== Draw ==
=== Key ===
- Q = Qualifier
- WC = Wild card
- LL = Lucky loser
- Alt = Alternate
- ITF = ITF entry
- PR = Protected ranking
- SR = Special ranking
- SE = Special exempt
- JE = Junior exempt
- JR = Junior Accelerator Programme entrant
- CO = College Accelerator Programme entrant
- NG = Next Gen Accelerator Program entrant
- w/o = Walkover
- r = Retired
- d = Defaulted

=== Finals ===
Semifinals
1	(Serbia) Novak Djokovic	4	6	6
3	Karen Khachanov	6	1	2
6	(Italy) Fabio Fognini	2	2
2	Andrey Rublev	6	6

Final
1	(Serbia) Novak Djokovic	2	7^{7}	0
2	Andrey Rublev	6	6^{4}	6

=== Top half ===
First round
WC	(Serbia) H Međedović	4	5
(Serbia) L Đere	6	7
(Austria) D Thiem	3	6	4
(Australia) J Millman	6	3	6
(France) R Gasquet	0	3
7	(Serbia) M Kecmanović	6	6
(Sweden) M Ymer	5	0
Q	R Safiullin	7	6
Q	(Brazil) T Monteiro	6	6
(Portugal) J Sousa	4	3
(Belgium) D Goffin	3	6^{4}
8	(Serbia) F Krajinović	6	7^{7}

Second round
1	(Serbia) N Djokovic	2	7^{8}	7^{7}
(Serbia) L Đere	6	6^{6}	6^{4}
(Australia) J Millman	4	6^{5}
7	(Serbia) M Kecmanović	6	7^{7}
3	K Khachanov	w/o
Q	R Safiullin
Q	(Brazil) T Monteiro	6	6
8	(Serbia) F Krajinović	4	1

Quarterfinals
1	(Serbia) N Djokovic	4	6	6
7	(Serbia) M Kecmanović	6	3	3
3	K Khachanov	7	6
Q	(Brazil) T Monteiro	5	4

Semifinals
1	(Serbia) N Djokovic	4	6	6
3	K Khachanov	6	1	2

=== Bottom half ===
First round
6	(Italy) F Fognini	6^{5}	6	6
(Italy) M Cecchinato	7^{7}	2	2
WC	(Kazakhstan) M Kukushkin	6^{4}	6	3
PR	(Slovenia) A Bedene	7^{7}	4	6
WC	(Chile) A Tabilo	0	3
(Germany) O Otte	6	6
5	(Chile) C Garín	3	1
(Denmark) H Rune	6	6
(Serbia) D Lajović	6	1	6^{2}
Q	(Japan) T Daniel	2	6	7^{7}
(Switzerland) H Laaksonen	2	5
Q	(Czech Republic) J Lehečka	6	7

Second round
6	(Italy) F Fognini	6	6
PR	(Slovenia) A Bedene	2	3
(Germany) O Otte	6^{4}	6	6
4	A Karatsev	7^{7}	1	3
(Denmark) H Rune	3	7^{7}	3
Q	(Japan) T Daniel	6	6^{1}	6
Q	(Czech Republic) J Lehečka	6	6^{1}	2
2	A Rublev	4	7^{7}	6

Quarterfinals
6	(Italy) F Fognini	7	6
(Germany) O Otte	5	4
Q	(Japan) T Daniel	3	3
2	A Rublev	6	6

Semifinals
6	(Italy) F Fognini	2	2
2	A Rublev	6	6

== Qualifying ==
=== Seeds ===
1. (Czech Republic) Jiří Lehečka (qualified)
2. (Japan) Taro Daniel (qualified)
3. (Slovakia) Norbert Gombos (qualifying competition)
4. (Brazil) Thiago Monteiro (qualified)
5. (United Kingdom) Liam Broady (qualifying competition)
6. (Bosnia and Herzegovina) Damir Džumhur (qualifying competition)
7. (Italy) Flavio Cobolli (qualifying competition)
8. Roman Safiullin (qualified)

=== Qualifiers ===
1. (Czech Republic) Jiří Lehečka
2. (Japan) Taro Daniel
3. Roman Safiullin
4. (Brazil) Thiago Monteiro

=== Draw ===
==== First qualifier ====
First round
1	(Czech Republic) Jiří Lehečka	6	6
(Croatia) Nino Serdarušić	0	4
WC	(Switzerland) Nikola Đošić	1	2
7	(Italy) Flavio Cobolli	6	6

Qualifying competition
1	(Czech Republic) Jiří Lehečka	6	7^{7}
7	(Italy) Flavio Cobolli	4	6^{3}

==== Second qualifier ====
First round
2	(Japan) Taro Daniel	7	6
Alt	(Kazakhstan) Aleksandr Nedovyesov	5	1
WC	(Czech Republic) Jakub Menšík	2	1
5	(United Kingdom) Liam Broady	6	6

Qualifying competition
2	(Japan) Taro Daniel	6	6
5	(United Kingdom) Liam Broady	1	3

==== Third qualifier ====
First round
3	(Slovakia) Norbert Gombos	6	6
(Germany) Cedrik-Marcel Stebe	4	3
(Australia) Max Purcell	7^{7}	4	4
8	Roman Safiullin	6^{3}	6	6

Qualifying competition
3	(Slovakia) Norbert Gombos	2	7^{7}	0
8	Roman Safiullin	6	6^{2}	6

==== Fourth qualifier ====
First round
4	(Brazil) Thiago Monteiro	7^{7}	4	6
(Italy) Giulio Zeppieri	6^{4}	6	4
(France) Gilles Simon	6	5	2
6	(Bosnia and Herzegovina) Damir Džumhur	3	7	6

Qualifying competition
4	(Brazil) Thiago Monteiro	6	3	6
6	(Bosnia and Herzegovina) Damir Džumhur	3	6	4
