= 2022 Serbia Open – Doubles =

Doubles
- 2022 Serbia Open

Final
- Champions: (Uruguay) Ariel Behar (Ecuador) Gonzalo Escobar
- Runners-up: (Croatia) Nikola Mektić (Croatia) Mate Pavić
- Score: 6–2, 3–6, [10–7]

Events
Singles	Doubles
- Serbia Open

Ariel Behar and Gonzalo Escobar defeated Nikola Mektić and Mate Pavić in the final, 6–2, 3–6, [10–7], to win the doubles title at the 2022 Serbia Open. The unseeded duo earned their third career ATP Tour doubles title together.

Ivan and Matej Sabanov were the defending champions, but they lost in the quarterfinals to Mektić and Pavić.

== Seeds ==
1. (Croatia) Nikola Mektić / (Croatia) Mate Pavić (final)
2. (Italy) Simone Bolelli / (Italy) Fabio Fognini (quarterfinals)
3. (Australia) Matthew Ebden / (Australia) Max Purcell (quarterfinals)
4. (Croatia) Ivan Dodig / (United States) Austin Krajicek (first round)

== Draw ==
Key

- Q = Qualifier
- WC = Wild card
- LL = Lucky loser
- Alt = Alternate
- ITF = ITF entry
- PR = Protected ranking
- SR = Special ranking
- SE = Special exempt
- JE = Junior exempt
- JR = Junior Accelerator Programme entrant
- CO = College Accelerator Programme entrant
- NG = Next Gen Accelerator Program entrant
- w/o = Walkover
- r = Retired
- d = Defaulted

=== Draw ===
First Round
1	(Croatia) N Mektić (Croatia) M Pavić	7^{7}	6
(Mexico) H Hach Verdugo (Austria) P Oswald	6^{5}	4
(India) R Bopanna (Netherlands) M Middelkoop	3	7^{7}	[6]
WC	(Serbia) I Sabanov (Serbia) M Sabanov	6	6^{2}	[10]
4	(Croatia) I Dodig (United States) A Krajicek	4	4
(Monaco) H Nys (Poland) J Zieliński	6	6
(Kazakhstan) A Golubev (France) F Martin	5	6	[9]
(Sweden) A Göransson (Japan) B McLachlan	7	1	[11]
(Bosnia and Herzegovina) T Brkić (Serbia) N Ćaćić	6	3	[11]
(Kazakhstan) A Nedovyesov (Pakistan) A-u-H Qureshi	2	6	[9]
(Israel) J Erlich; A Karatsev	6	1	[8]
3	(Australia) M Ebden (Australia) M Purcell	2	6	[10]
(United Kingdom) L Glasspool (Finland) H Heliövaara	4	3
(Uruguay) A Behar (Ecuador) G Escobar	6	6
WC	(Serbia) H Međedović (Czech Republic) J Menšík	4	5
2	(Italy) S Bolelli (Italy) F Fognini	6	7

Quarterfinals
1	(Croatia) N Mektić (Croatia) M Pavić	2	6	[10]
WC	(Serbia) I Sabanov (Serbia) M Sabanov	6	3	[4]
(Monaco) H Nys (Poland) J Zieliński	6	3	[10]
(Sweden) A Göransson (Japan) B McLachlan	3	6	[7]
(Bosnia and Herzegovina) T Brkić (Serbia) N Ćaćić	3	7^{9}	[10]
3	(Australia) M Ebden (Australia) M Purcell	6	6^{7}	[4]
(Uruguay) A Behar (Ecuador) G Escobar	7^{7}	7^{7}
2	(Italy) S Bolelli (Italy) F Fognini	6^{5}	6^{4}

Semifinals
1	(Croatia) N Mektić (Croatia) M Pavić	7^{7}	6
(Monaco) H Nys (Poland) J Zieliński	6^{3}	3
(Bosnia and Herzegovina) T Brkić (Serbia) N Ćaćić	2	6^{3}
(Uruguay) A Behar (Ecuador) G Escobar	6	7^{7}

Final
1	(Croatia) N Mektić (Croatia) M Pavić	2	6	[7]
(Uruguay) A Behar (Ecuador) G Escobar	6	3	[10]
