= 2022 Astana Open =

Tennis tournament in Kazakhstan

- Date: 3–9 October
- Edition: 3rd
- Category: ATP Tour 500
- Draw: 32S / 16D
- Prize money: $1,900,000
- Surface: Hard (indoor)
- Location: Astana, Kazakhstan
- Venue: Daulet National Tennis Centre

Champions

Singles
- (Serbia) Novak Djokovic

Doubles
- (Croatia) Nikola Mektić / (Croatia) Mate Pavić
- Astana Open

The 2022 Astana Open was a professional men's tennis tournament to be held on indoor hard courts. It was the third edition of the Astana Open and part of the ATP Tour 500 Series of the 2022 ATP Tour.

The event was held on a third consecutive year in the alternative sporting calendar, but it was upgraded to the ATP 500 level following the cancellation of tournaments in China in 2022 because of the ongoing COVID-19 pandemic. The tournament took place in Astana, Kazakhstan, from 3–9 October. The women's event was discontinued this year.

== Champions ==
=== Singles ===
- (Serbia) Novak Djokovic def. (Greece) Stefanos Tsitsipas, 6–3, 6–4
- It was Djokovic's 4th title of the year and the 90th of his career.

=== Doubles ===
- (Croatia) Nikola Mektić / (Croatia) Mate Pavić def. (France) Adrian Mannarino / (France) Fabrice Martin, 6–4, 6–2

== Singles main draw entrants ==
=== Seeds ===
Country	Player	Rank^{1}	Seed
ESP	Carlos Alcaraz	1	1
	Daniil Medvedev	4	2
GRE	Stefanos Tsitsipas	6	3
SRB	Novak Djokovic	7	4
	Andrey Rublev	9	5
~~ITA~~	~~Jannik Sinner~~	~~10~~	~~6~~
POL	Hubert Hurkacz	11	7
CAN	Félix Auger-Aliassime	13	8
CRO	Marin Čilić	16	9

- Rankings are as of September 26, 2022.

=== Other entrants ===
The following players received wildcards into the singles main draw:

- (Serbia) Novak Djokovic
- (Kazakhstan) Mikhail Kukushkin
- (Switzerland) Stan Wawrinka
- (Kazakhstan) Beibit Zhukayev

The following player received entry as a special exempt:

- (Switzerland) Marc-Andrea Hüsler

The following players received entry from the qualifying draw:

- (Serbia) Laslo Đere
- (Italy) Luca Nardi
- (Russia) Alexander Shevchenko
- (China) Zhang Zhizhen

The following players received entry as lucky losers:

- (Belgium) David Goffin
- (Russia) Pavel Kotov

=== Withdrawals ===
- (Georgia (country)) Nikoloz Basilashvili → replaced by (Spain) Albert Ramos Viñolas
- (Bulgaria) Grigor Dimitrov → replaced by (France) Adrian Mannarino
- (France) Gaël Monfils → replaced by (Germany) Oscar Otte
- (Italy) Lorenzo Musetti → replaced by (Finland) Emil Ruusuvuori
- (Denmark) Holger Rune → replaced by (Belgium) David Goffin
- (Argentina) Diego Schwartzman → replaced by (Kazakhstan) Alexander Bublik
- (Italy) Jannik Sinner → replaced by (Russia) Pavel Kotov
- (Italy) Lorenzo Sonego → replaced by (Netherlands) Tallon Griekspoor

== Doubles main draw entrants ==
=== Seeds ===
Country	Player	Country	Player	Rank^{1}	Seed
GER	Tim Pütz	NZL	Michael Venus	15	1
CRO	Nikola Mektić	CRO	Mate Pavić	19	2
ESP	Marcel Granollers	ARG	Horacio Zeballos	23	3
GBR	Lloyd Glasspool	FIN	Harri Heliövaara	34	4

- Rankings are as of September 26, 2022

=== Other entrants ===
The following pairs received wildcards into the doubles main draw:

- (Kazakhstan) Alexander Bublik / (Kazakhstan) Beibit Zhukayev
- (Kazakhstan) Grigoriy Lomakin / (Kazakhstan) Denis Yevseyev

The following pair received entry from the qualifying draw:

- (Ecuador) Diego Hidalgo / (Colombia) Cristian Rodríguez

=== Withdrawals ===
- (El Salvador) Marcelo Arévalo / (Netherlands) Jean-Julien Rojer → replaced by (Argentina) Francisco Cerúndolo / (Argentina) Andrés Molteni
- (Colombia) Juan Sebastian Cabal / (Colombia) Robert Farah → replaced by (France) Adrian Mannarino / (France) Fabrice Martin
- (Netherlands) Wesley Koolhof / (United Kingdom) Neal Skupski → replaced by (Kazakhstan) Andrey Golubev / (Kazakhstan) Aleksandr Nedovyesov
- (United States) Rajeev Ram / (United Kingdom) Joe Salisbury → replaced by (Germany) Kevin Krawietz / (Germany) Andreas Mies
