= 2022 Astana Open – Doubles =

Doubles
- 2022 Astana Open

Final
- Champions: (Croatia) Nikola Mektić (Croatia) Mate Pavić
- Runners-up: (France) Adrian Mannarino (France) Fabrice Martin
- Score: 6–4, 6–2

Events
Singles	Doubles
← 2021 ·	Astana Open	· 2023 →

Nikola Mektić and Mate Pavić defeated Adrian Mannarino and Fabrice Martin in the final, 6–4, 6–2 to win the doubles tennis title at the 2022 Astana Open.

Santiago González and Andrés Molteni were the defending champions, but did not compete together. González partnered Łukasz Kubot, but lost in the first round to Tim Pütz and Michael Venus. Molteni partnered Francisco Cerúndolo, but lost in the first round to Kevin Krawietz and Andreas Mies.

== Seeds ==
1. (Germany) Tim Pütz / (New Zealand) Michael Venus (quarterfinals)
2. (Croatia) Nikola Mektić / (Croatia) Mate Pavić (champions)
3. (Spain) Marcel Granollers / (Argentina) Horacio Zeballos (semifinals)
4. (United Kingdom) Lloyd Glasspool / (Finland) Harri Heliövaara (first round)

== Draw ==
=== Key ===
- Q = Qualifier
- WC = Wild card
- LL = Lucky loser
- Alt = Alternate
- SE = Special exempt
- PR = Protected ranking
- ITF = ITF entry
- JE = Junior exempt
- w/o = Walkover
- r = Retired
- d = Defaulted
- SR = Special ranking

=== Draw ===
First round
1	(Germany) T Pütz (New Zealand) M Venus	6^{6}	7^{8}	[10]
PR	(Mexico) S González (Poland) Ł Kubot	7^{8}	6^{6}	[6]
(Kazakhstan) A Golubev (Kazakhstan) A Nedovyesov	6	4	[9]
(France) A Mannarino (France) F Martin	3	6	[11]
4	(United Kingdom) L Glasspool (Finland) H Heliövaara	6^{2}	3
(Poland) H Hurkacz (Poland) J Zieliński	7^{7}	6
(Italy) S Bolelli (Italy) F Fognini	6	6
WC	(Kazakhstan) A Bublik (Kazakhstan) B Zhukayev	4	2
(Argentina) F Cerúndolo (Argentina) A Molteni	4	4
(Germany) K Krawietz (Germany) A Mies	6	6
Q	(Ecuador) D Hidalgo (Colombia) C Rodríguez	6^{2}	6	[7]
3	(Spain) M Granollers (Argentina) H Zeballos	7^{7}	2	[10]
WC	(Kazakhstan) G Lomakin (Kazakhstan) D Yevseyev	3	2
(Croatia) I Dodig (United States) A Krajicek	6	6
(India) R Bopanna (Netherlands) M Middelkoop	6^{3}	2
2	(Croatia) N Mektić (Croatia) M Pavić	7^{7}	6

Quarterfinals
1	(Germany) T Pütz (New Zealand) M Venus	3	4
(France) A Mannarino (France) F Martin	6	6
(Poland) H Hurkacz (Poland) J Zieliński	4	6	[11]
(Italy) S Bolelli (Italy) F Fognini	6	2	[9]
(Germany) K Krawietz (Germany) A Mies	6	4	[8]
3	(Spain) M Granollers (Argentina) H Zeballos	3	6	[10]
(Croatia) I Dodig (United States) A Krajicek	6^{4}	3
2	(Croatia) N Mektić (Croatia) M Pavić	7^{7}	6

Semifinals
(France) A Mannarino (France) F Martin	2	6	[10]
(Poland) H Hurkacz (Poland) J Zieliński	6	2	[5]
3	(Spain) M Granollers (Argentina) H Zeballos	6	6^{4}	[7]
2	(Croatia) N Mektić (Croatia) M Pavić	3	7^{7}	[10]

Final
(France) A Mannarino (France) F Martin	4	2
2	(Croatia) N Mektić (Croatia) M Pavić	6	6

== Qualifying ==
=== Seeds ===
1. (Ecuador) Diego Hidalgo / (Colombia) Cristian Rodríguez (qualified)
2. (France) Jonathan Eysseric / (New Zealand) Artem Sitak (qualifying competition)

=== Qualifiers ===
1. (Ecuador) Diego Hidalgo / (Colombia) Cristian Rodríguez

=== Qualifying draw ===
First round
1	(Ecuador) Diego Hidalgo (Colombia) Cristian Rodríguez	6	3	[10]
Alt	(Uzbekistan) Denis Istomin (Kazakhstan) Timur Khabibulin	0	6	[5]
WC	Pavel Kotov; Alexander Shevchenko	5	4
2	(France) Jonathan Eysseric (New Zealand) Artem Sitak	7	6

Qualifying competition
1	(Ecuador) Diego Hidalgo (Colombia) Cristian Rodríguez	6	6
2	(France) Jonathan Eysseric (New Zealand) Artem Sitak	3	3
