= David Goffin =

Belgian tennis player (born 1990)

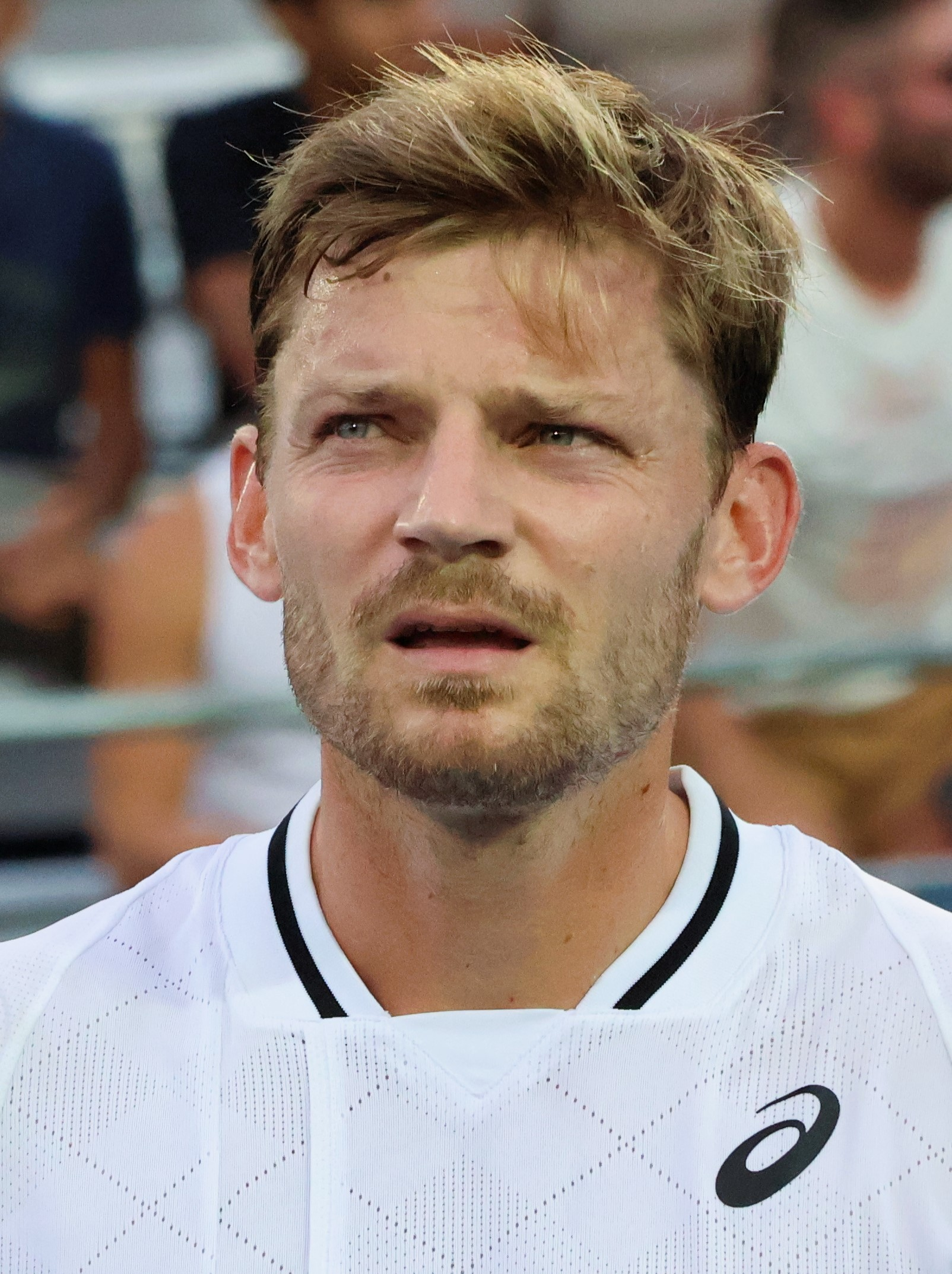
- Goffin at the 2024 Washington Open
- Country (sports): Belgium
- Residence: Monte Carlo, Monaco
- Born: 7 December 1990 (age 35) Rocourt, Liège, Belgium
- Height: 1.80 m (5 ft 11 in)
- Turned pro: 2009
- Retired: 22 October 2026
- Plays: Right-handed (two-handed backhand)
- Coach: Yannis Demeroutis
- Prize money: US $20,294,173: 41st all-time in earnings

Singles
- Career record: 358–276 (Note: in ATP Tour and Grand Slam main draw matches, and in Davis Cup)
- Career titles: 6
- Highest ranking: No. 7 (20 November 2017)
- Current ranking: No. 317 (31 August 2026)

Grand Slam singles results
- Australian Open: QF (2017)
- French Open: QF (2016)
- Wimbledon: QF (2019, 2022)
- US Open: 4R (2017, 2018, 2019, 2020)

Other tournaments
- Tour Finals: F (2017)
- Olympic Games: 3R (2016)

Doubles
- Career record: 17–38
- Career titles: 1
- Highest ranking: No. 158 (15 July 2019)

Grand Slam doubles results
- Australian Open: 1R (2013, 2025)
- Wimbledon: 1R (2025)
- US Open: 1R (2012, 2015, 2025)

Team competitions
- Davis Cup: F (2015, 2017)
- Hopman Cup: RR (2018)
- Last updated on: 1 September 2026.

David Goffin (French pronunciation: [david ɡɔfɛ̃]; born 7 December 1990) is a Belgian former professional tennis player. He achieved a career-high ATP singles ranking of world No. 7, making him the highest-ranked Belgian male player in tennis history and also the first and only Belgian man to be ranked in the Top 10.

Goffin has won six ATP titles and reached nine other finals, most notably at the 2017 ATP Finals. Goffin's breakthrough came at the 2012 French Open, where he was a lucky loser making his major debut. He reached the fourth round before losing to Roger Federer in four sets. Goffin has since reached four major quarterfinals, at the 2016 French Open, and the 2017 Australian Open, and the 2019 and 2022 Wimbledon Championships. At the 2017 ATP Finals, Goffin defeated Dominic Thiem, world No. 1 Rafael Nadal and world No. 2 Roger Federer en route to the final where he lost to Grigor Dimitrov.

== Playing style and endorsements ==
Goffin plays a baseline-oriented game, and he is considered to be an offensive baseliner, with accurate groundstrokes. He uses his forehand to move opponents around the court, but his two-handed backhand is his strongest shot, particularly down-the-line. Both wings are capable of producing winners. He is also one of the best returners in the game. He doesn't have a fast serve, mostly rely on his baseline precision to attack his opponents. He moves around the court quickly, and is also excellent at retrieving tricky balls. He is solid at the net, but this isn't one of his major assets.

Goffin is sponsored by Wilson for his racquets and Asics for his clothing and footwear. He uses the Wilson Blade 98 18x20 Countervail racquet.

== Career ==
=== Juniors ===
As a junior, he compiled a singles win–loss record of 76–40, reaching as high as No. 10 in the junior combined world rankings in July 2008. He took part in only two junior slams, losing in the second round of the French Open and the first round of Wimbledon in 2008.

=== 2009–11 ===
Throughout the 2009 season, Goffin played Futures and Challenger tournaments. His best result of the year came when he qualified for Todi, Italy. He won four consecutive matches after qualification, eventually succumbing to Simon Greul, ranked No. 84, in a semifinal in straight sets.

In 2010, Goffin played Futures and Challenger tournaments throughout the year with varying results. He finished the year ranked No. 233.

Goffin won his first match on the ATP tour at the 2011 Chennai open, defeating India's No. 1, Somdev Devvarman. He lost in the second round to Stanislas Wawrinka.

=== 2012: Breakthrough at the French Open ===
In 2012, he reached the quarterfinals of an ATP World Tour tournament for the first time at the 2012 Chennai Open, after defeating top-50 countryman Xavier Malisse and Andreas Beck.

At the French Open 2012, though he did not win in the last qualifying round of the qualifications, he entered the tournament's main draw as a lucky loser thanks to the withdrawal of Gaël Monfils. In his first round, he faced world no. 27 and 23rd seed for men's singles Radek Štěpánek and beat him in five sets. The second round saw Goffin take on French veteran player Arnaud Clément (who was playing his last French Open) whom he beat in five sets in a match postponed due to rain at a score of 5–1 the previous day. Goffin then beat Łukasz Kubot in the third round to become the first lucky loser to reach the last 16 of a Grand Slam since compatriot Dick Norman at Wimbledon 1995. Goffin was eventually eliminated by third seed Roger Federer, but not before managing to win the first set.

He received one of the wild cards for Wimbledon, and in the first round he beat 20th seed and 2011 quarterfinalist Bernard Tomic. Then, in the second round, he beat Jesse Levine to advance to the third round, where he ultimately lost to the resurgent 10th seed Mardy Fish.

At the 2012 Summer Olympics, he lost in the first round of the men's singles to Juan Mónaco.

At the US Open, he entered the main draw, but lost in the first round to world no. 7, sixth seed, and eventually semifinalist at the tournament Tomáš Berdych.

He then won two singles matches to secure Belgium a place in the 2013 Davis Cup World Group.

=== 2013: Inconsistencies ===
Goffin started the season by making his debut at the 2013 Brisbane International. He defeated wildcard (and crowd favourite) Matthew Ebden, before losing to seventh seed Jürgen Melzer in the second round.

In the first round of the French Open, he faced then-No. 1, Novak Djokovic. He proved a challenge for Djokovic, but lost the match in straight sets. Goffin's performance as well as Djokovic's laboured efforts in defeating him were the subject of brief attention to the quality of Goffin's playing.

Goffin made it to the third round in Cincinnati, where he was again defeated by Djokovic. He qualified in Winston-Salem and defeated Jack Sock in the first round, but lost to Dmitry Tursunov in the second round. He did not play any tournaments in 2013 after the US Open, where he lost in the first round to Alexandr Dolgopolov.

=== 2014: Maiden ATP World Tour title ===
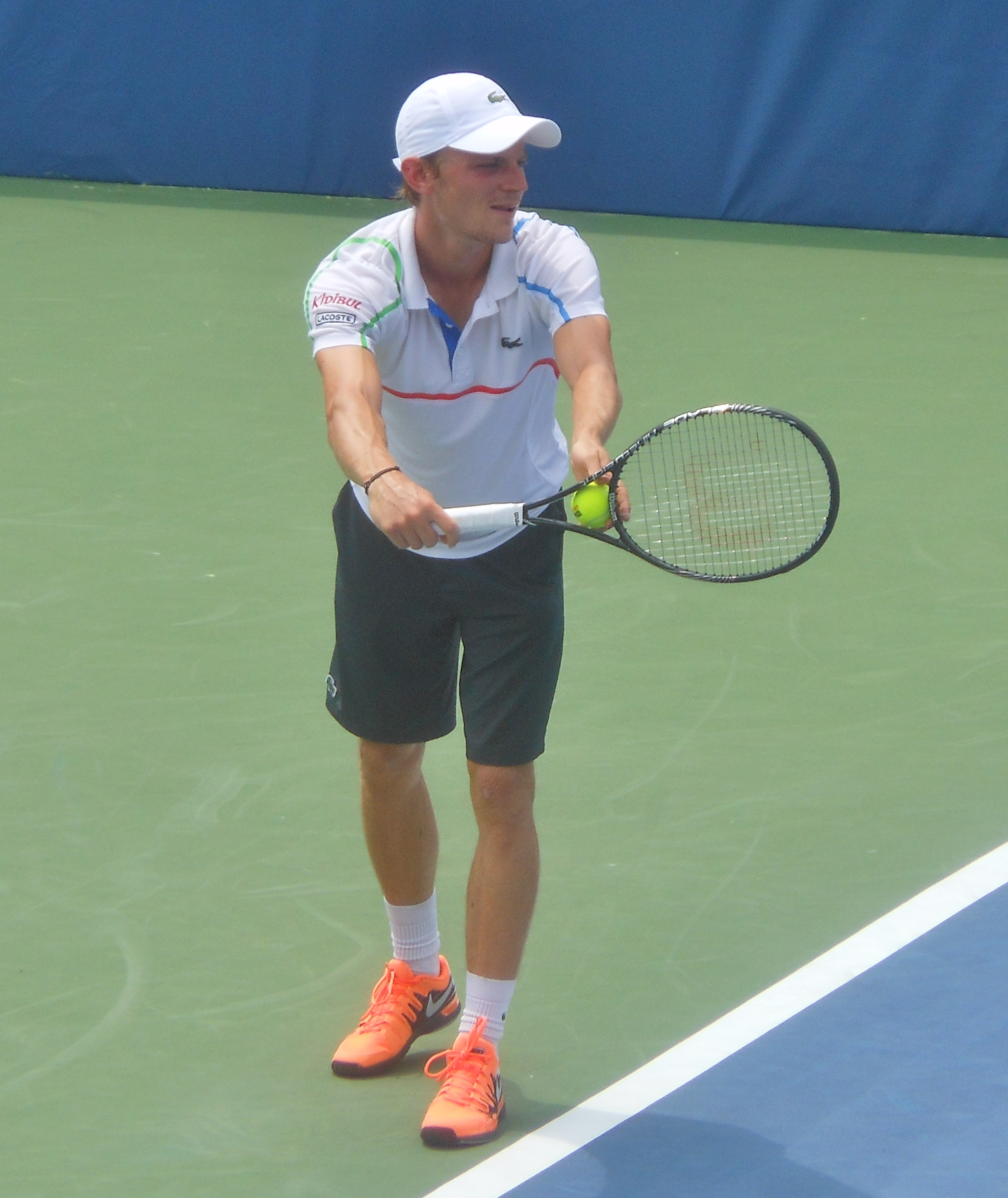
Goffin at the 2014 Winston-Salem Open

Goffin had to retire in his second-round match at the Challenger event in New Caledonia, and he withdrew from qualifying for the Australian Open due to a left quadriceps injury.

From July to August, following his opening round loss at Wimbledon to defending champion Andy Murray, Goffin won four consecutive tournaments. The first three were Challengers, but the fourth was his maiden ATP tour-level title when he won the Austrian Open Kitzbühel, beating Dominic Thiem in the final. During this run, Goffin won 40 out of the 42 sets he played and won 20 consecutive matches.

In September, after reaching the third round of the US Open for the first time, he won his second career ATP title, the Moselle Open in Metz, France, beating higher seeded players Jo-Wilfried Tsonga in the quarterfinals and João Sousa in the final. His run from July to September launched him over 75 places up the rankings, putting him into the world's top 40 for the first time in his career.

At the Swiss Indoors in Basel, he advanced to his first ATP 500 tournament final, beating Milos Raonic in the quarterfinals, his first win over a top-10 player. He lost the final to five-time champion Roger Federer in straight sets; however, his run to the final propelled him to a career-high ranking of No. 22 in the world, a ranking with which he would finish the 2014 season. After having started the year ranked 111th in the world, Goffin ended the season ranked just outside the top 20, a difference of 89 places, and as a result he was awarded the Comeback Player of the Year award by the ATP for 2014.

=== 2015: Top 20, Davis Cup final ===
2015 saw Goffin have continued success, reaching two more ATP finals and breaking into the world's top 20, as well as decent runs in the major tournaments. His season was highlighted by being the driving force in the Belgium Davis Cup team's surprise run to the final, which they lost to Great Britain, Goffin being defeated by Andy Murray in the decisive fourth rubber after having earlier won the second rubber against Kyle Edmund.

=== 2016: Top 15, French Open quarterfinal ===
Goffin reached fourth round for the first time at 2016 Australian Open, where he lost to Roger Federer in straight sets. In March at Indian Wells, he reached his first Masters 1000 semifinal, where he lost to Milos Raonic. He followed it up with another semifinal defeat in Miami, losing to Novak Djokovic in straights sets. He next competed in the Monte Carlo Masters. He defeated Feliciano López in the first round. He then played Fernando Verdasco and won in a close match. He then lost to lucky loser Marcel Granollers. Goffin then competed in the BMW Open. In his first match, he defeated Víctor Estrella Burgos. He then played Alexander Zverev and lost. At the Mutua Madrid Open despite having four match points, he lost in the first round to Lucas Pouille. Then he competed in the Rome Masters. He won his first match against Leonardo Mayer. He next played Jack Sock in the second round, winning in straight sets. He then played world No. 8 Tomáš Berdych and defeated him without losing a single game. In the quarterfinals, he lost to second seed Andy Murray.

At the French Open, he played the first round against wild card Grégoire Barrère. He won in straight sets. In the second round, he played against qualifier Carlos Berlocq and won again in straight sets. In the third round, he won in a more than 3 hours match against Nicolás Almagro. In the fourth round, he won in four sets against Ernests Gulbis. His tournament ended in the quarterfinals, where he lost to Dominic Thiem in four sets. At Wimbledon, he won in the first and second round in straight sets. In the third round, he needed four sets to win against Denis Istomin. In the fourth round, he lost to Milos Raonic after he had a 2–0 advance in sets.

Goffin reached the third round of the men's singles at the 2016 Olympics in Rio, beating Sam Groth and Dudi Sela before unexpectedly losing to Thomasz Bellucci.

Goffin was upset in the first round of the US Open, losing in four sets to 19-year-old American Jared Donaldson. Goffin took part in the Tour Finals as a reserve after Gaël Monfils had to withdraw due to injury. Goffin was defeated by Novak Djokovic in the round-robin stage.

=== 2017: Top 10, ATP Finals runner-up, Davis Cup final ===
Goffin started 2017 at the World Tennis Championship in Abu Dhabi. He defeated Jo-Wilfried Tsonga in the quarterfinals and top seed Andy Murray in the semifinals, before losing to Rafael Nadal in the final. At the Qatar Open, he defeated Robin Haase in the opening round before losing to Fernando Verdasco in the second round. Goffin reached the quarterfinals of a Grand Slam for the second time in Melbourne, following victories over Reilly Opelka, Radek Štěpánek, Ivo Karlović and Dominic Thiem. He was then defeated in straight sets by Grigor Dimitrov.

In February, Goffin defeated defending champion Roberto Bautista Agut to reach the final of the Sofia Open. There, he lost in straight sets again to Dimitrov. A week later, he recorded his first victory over Dimitrov in the quarterfinals of the Rotterdam Open. Goffin went on to reach his second-straight final, but lost in three sets to Jo-Wilfried Tsonga. This resulted in him achieving a top ten ranking for the first time, becoming the first Belgian man to do so.

After losing in the Round of 16 at both Indian Wells and Miami, Goffin led the Belgian Davis Cup team to victory over Italy in the World Group quarterfinals by winning both of his singles rubbers against Andreas Seppi and Paolo Lorenzi.

At the Monte Carlo Masters, Goffin defeated world No. 9 Dominic Thiem and world No. 2 Novak Djokovic to reach the semifinals. There, he lost in straight sets to the eventual champion, Rafael Nadal. He went on to reach the quarterfinals in Madrid and the round of 16 in Rome, falling to Nadal and Marin Čilić, respectively.

At the 2017 French Open, Goffin was forced to retire whilst leading his third round match against Horacio Zeballos. He injured his right ankle when he tripped on a tarpaulin by the side of the court.

Goffin returned to the tour in July with early losses at Umag and Gstaad. Following second and first round losses in Montréal and Cincinnati, respectively, Goffin reached the fourth round of the US Open for the first time. There, he lost to Andrey Rublev in straight sets. He then led Belgium to another Davis Cup victory against Australia in the World Group semifinals with four-set wins in both his singles rubbers against Nick Kyrgios and John Millman. With this win, Belgium reached its second Davis Cup final in three years, having lost to Great Britain in the 2015 final.

In October, Goffin won back-to-back titles in Shenzhen and Tokyo. His title in Shenzhen was his third career title and first on the main tour since 2014, having lost in his six previous finals. By winning his first ATP 500 title in Tokyo, Goffin returned to the top ten, having been absent since May.

Goffin qualified outright for the season-ending ATP Finals for the first time, having played as an alternate for Gaël Monfils in 2016. In the round-robin stage, victories over World No. 1 Rafael Nadal and Dominic Thiem secured him the runner-up spot in the Pete Sampras Group, behind Grigor Dimitrov. He beat Roger Federer for the first time in his career in the semifinal, ending a six match losing streak against him. Goffin became the sixth player to beat Federer and Nadal at the same event and the first since Nikolay Davydenko in 2009 to beat the top two-ranked players at year-end finals. In the final, Goffin was beaten by Dimitrov, 7–5, 4–6, 6–3. He ended the year with a career-high ranking of No. 7.

In his final event of the season, Goffin represented Belgium in the Davis Cup World Group final against France in Villeneuve-d'Ascq, France on 24–26 November. Despite Goffin winning both his singles rubbers against Lucas Pouille and Jo-Wilfried Tsonga, the Belgian team were defeated 2–3. Goffin ended the year having won all six of the singles rubbers he played in 2017, against France, Italy in the quarterfinals, and Australia in the semifinals.

=== 2018: ATP 1000 semifinal ===
Goffin started the season at the Australian Open but was upset in the second round by Julien Benneteau. He rebounded from this disappointing start to the year by winning both of his singles rubbers against Attila Balázs and Márton Fucsovics to help Belgium win its Davis Cup World Group first round tie against Hungary and set up a quarterfinal matchup against the United States. Goffin then reached back-to-back semifinals at the Open Sud de France and the Rotterdam Open, where he lost to Richard Gasquet and Grigor Dimitrov, respectively. In Rotterdam, Goffin was forced to retire from his semifinal match against Dimitrov after a ball ricocheted off his racquet and hit him in the left eye. Due to swelling caused by the injury, Goffin withdrew from the Marseille Open, where he would have been the top seed. Two weeks later he also had to withdraw from Indian Wells. Goffin made his comeback in Miami, but was eliminated by João Sousa in his first match, having won only a game. After the Miami Open he had to return to Belgium to check his eye. Because of this check-up he wasn't able to participate in the World Group quarterfinals against the United States. Belgium lost by 4 rubbers to 0.

He reached the quarterfinals of the Monte Carlo Masters, where he lost to Grigor Dimitrov. He then competed at Barcelona, where he reached the semifinals, falling to eventual champion Rafael Nadal. At Rome, he reached the quarterfinals where he lost to defending champion Alexander Zverev. At the 2018 French Open, he reached the fourth round before losing to Marco Cecchinato, who went on to upset Novak Djokovic in the quarterfinals. In the grass season, Goffin lost in the first round of both Queen's and Wimbledon.

At Washington, Goffin reached the quarterfinals where he was defeated by Stefanos Tsitsipas. He lost in the first round of the 2018 Rogers Cup to Milos Raonic. He then saw a good performance at the Cincinnati Masters, defeating sixth seed Kevin Anderson and fourth seed Juan Martín del Potro on his way to the semifinals facing Roger Federer, where he was forced to retire due to injury after losing the first set tiebreak. At the 2018 US Open, he matched his 2017 performance, reaching the fourth round where he lost to Marin Čilić in straight sets. He had to end his season after a loss to Andy Murray in the Shenzhen Open in September because of pain in his elbow.

=== 2019: ATP 1000 final, Wimbledon quarterfinal ===
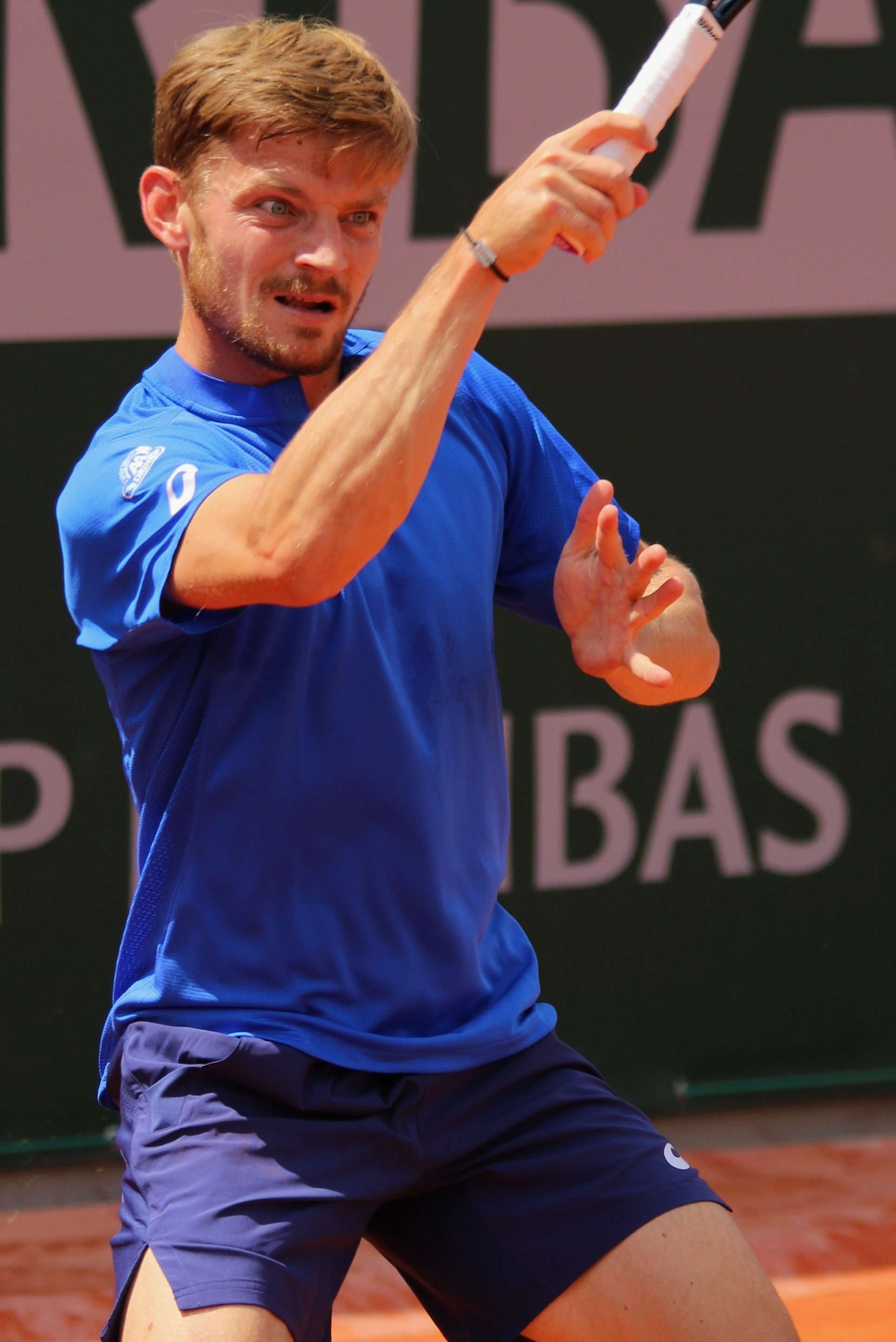
Goffin at the 2019 French Open

Goffin began his season at the Qatar Open where in singles he was upset by Ričardas Berankis in the first round. In the doubles with Pierre-Hugues Herbert he claimed his first ATP doubles title. He reached the third round of the Australian Open, where he lost to Daniil Medvedev. After early losses at Lyon and Rotterdam, he made the semifinals in Marseille, where he lost to top seed Stefanos Tsitsipas. In the clay season, he reached one semifinal, at the Estoril Open, again being defeated by Tsitsipas. At the French Open, he was defeated in the third round by Rafael Nadal.

Goffin had a productive grass season, reaching the quarterfinals at 's-Hertogenbosch and reaching the final of the ATP 500 event in Halle. Despite being unseeded, Goffin defeated eighth seed Guido Pella and second seed Alexander Zverev en route to the final, where he was defeated by top seed and nine-time champion Roger Federer. At Wimbledon, Goffin was seeded 21st, defeating Bradley Klahn, Jérémy Chardy, 11th seed Daniil Medvedev, and Fernando Verdasco to reach his first quarterfinal at the tournament. There, he was defeated by top seed and defending champion Novak Djokovic.

In the North American hard court season, Goffin suffered early defeats in Washington and Montreal. Defending a semifinal appearance at the Cincinnati Masters, Goffin was the 16th seed. He defeated Taylor Fritz, Guido Pella, Adrian Mannarino before receiving a walkover over Yoshihito Nishioka in the quarterfinals. He defeated Richard Gasquet in straight sets in the semifinals to reach his first Masters 1000 final. There, he was defeated by ninth seed Daniil Medvedev. In the US Open, Goffin reached the round of 16 where he was defeated by Roger Federer in straight sets.

=== 2020: US Open fourth round for a fourth straight year ===
Goffin started the year by representing Belgium at the first edition of the ATP Cup. In their first tie against Moldova, he won his match over Radu Albot. Against England, he dropped his match to Dan Evans. at the 2020 Australian Open beating Jérémy Chardy, and Pierre-Hugues Herbert, before losing in four sets to Andrey Rublev. At the Open Sud de France, Goffin was defeated by Vasek Pospisil in the semi-finals. Later, at the Rotterdam Open, Goffin was seeded fourth but was defeated by Jannik Sinner.

At the Open 13 and Western & Southern Open, Goffin lost to Egor Gerasimov and Jan-Lennard Struff respectively. At the US Open, he lost to Denis Shapovalov in the round of 16. This was his 4th round for a fourth straight year at this Grand Slam.

In October, Goffin tested positive for COVID-19, and hence withdrew from the St. Petersburg Open.

=== 2021: Fifth title, Injury and early season ending ===
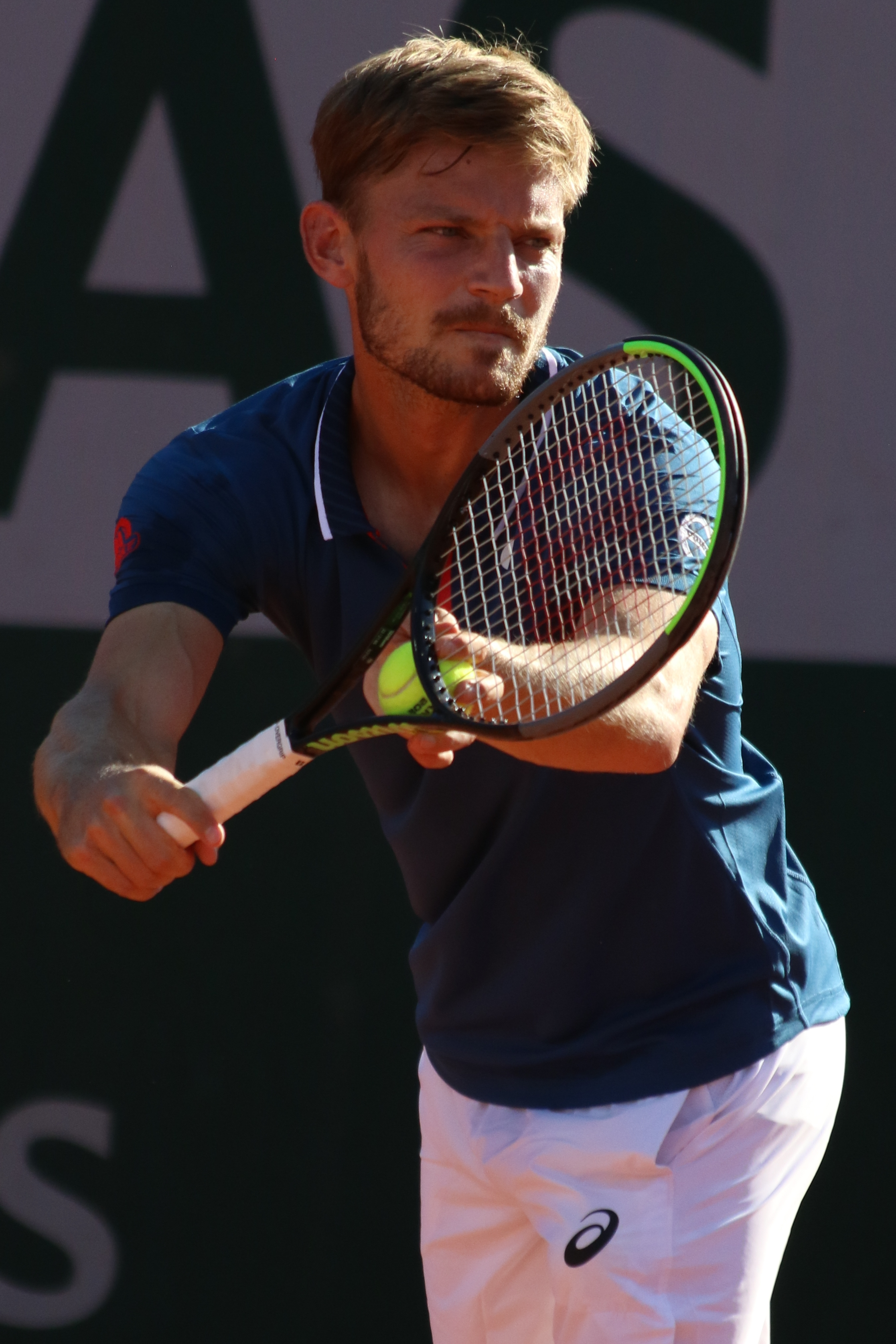
Goffin at the 2021 French Open

Goffin started 2021 at the Antalya Open. Seeded second, he reached the semifinals where he lost to fourth seed and eventual champion, Alex de Minaur. As the top seed at the first edition of the Great Ocean Road Open, he was defeated in the second round by rising star Carlos Alcaraz. Seeded 13th at the Australian Open, he was eliminated in the first round by Australian wildcard Alexei Popyrin in five sets, despite holding four match points in the fourth set.

Seeded second at the Open Sud de France, Goffin won his fifth ATP tour singles title beating top seed, Roberto Bautista Agut, in the final. Seeded sixth at the Rotterdam Open, he was beaten in the second round by qualifier Jérémy Chardy. Seeded sixth in Doha, he fell in his second-round match to Taylor Fritz. Seeded fifth at the Dubai Championships, he lost in the second round to Kei Nishikori. Seeded eighth at the Miami Open, he was defeated in the second round by James Duckworth.

Seeded 11th at the Monte-Carlo Masters, his first clay-court tournament of the season, Goffin reached the quarterfinals beating Marin Čilić, qualifier Marco Cecchinato, and fifth seed Alexander Zverev. He was eliminated in his quarterfinal match by Dan Evans, who had upset world No. 1, Novak Djokovic, in the previous round. Seeded eighth at the Barcelona Open, he retired during his third-round match against Cam Norrie due to a leg injury. He returned from injury in June at the Italian Open. Seeded 12th, he was beaten in the second round by qualifier Federico Delbonis. Seeded fourth in Lyon, he lost in the second round to Aljaž Bedene. Seeded 13th at the French Open, he was defeated in the first round by Lorenzo Musetti.

Turning to the grass-court season, Goffin, the seventh seed at the Halle Open, retired in the first round against Corentin Moutet due to an ankle injury. As a result, he missed Wimbledon due to the same injury.

Goffin returned to the scene in August at the Western & Southern Open in Cincinnati. Seeded 15th, he was beaten in the first round by Guido Pella. Seeded 27th at the US Open, he was defeated in the first round by American Mackenzie McDonald. On September 9, 2021, he announced on Instagram that he would miss the rest of the season due to a knee injury.

Goffin ended the year ranked 39.

=== 2022: Second Wimbledon quarterfinal, sixth title ===
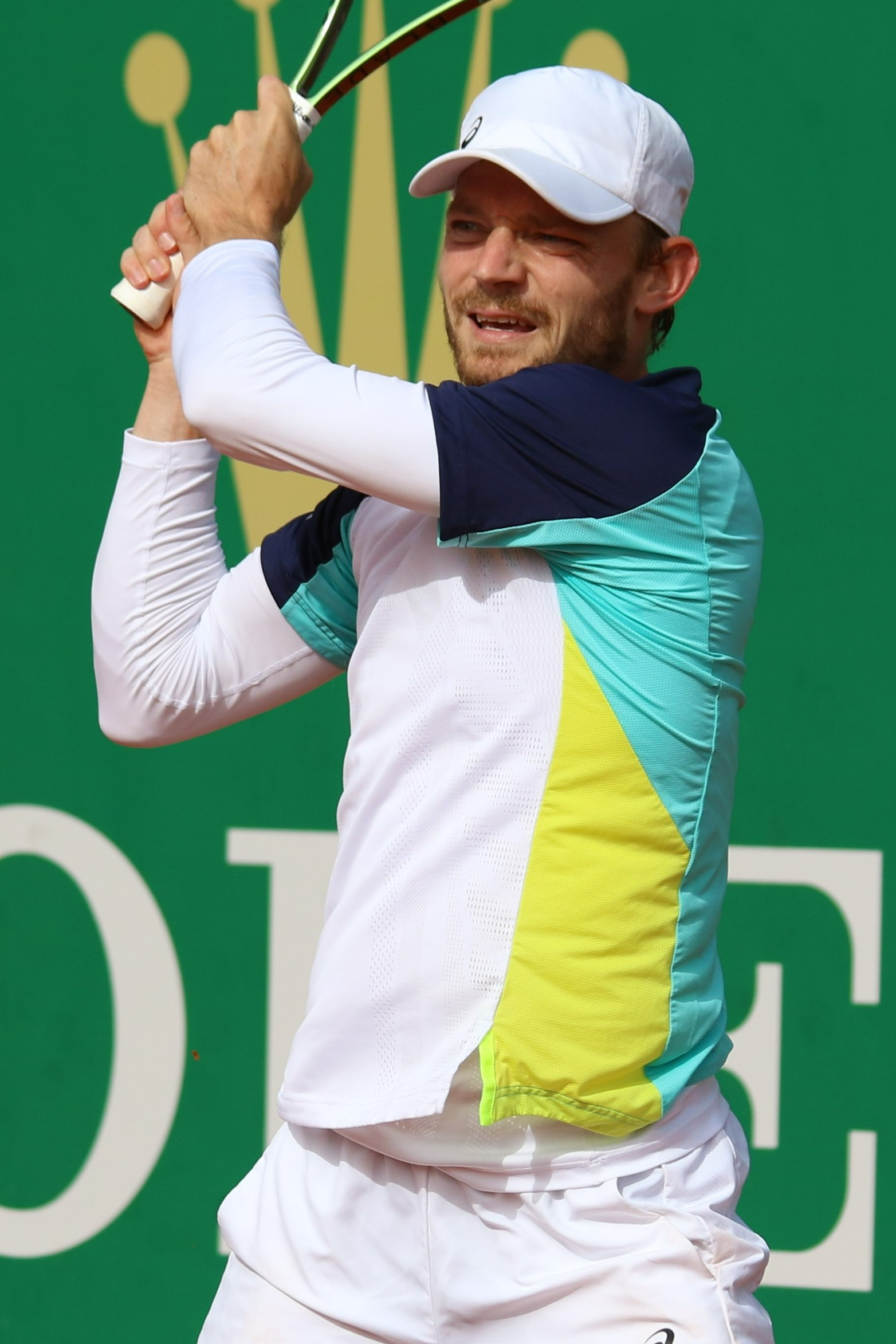
Goffin at the 2022 Monte-Carlo Masters

Goffin started his 2022 season at the first edition of the 2022 Melbourne Summer Set 1. Seeded fourth, he lost in the second round to Alex Molčan. Seeded eighth at the Sydney Classic, he retired during his quarterfinal match against Andy Murray due to a knee injury. Ranked No. 45 at the Australian Open, he was defeated in the first round by 24th seed Dan Evans.

Seeded eighth and defending champion at the Open Sud de France in Montpellier, Goffin lost in the second round to Adrian Mannarino. In Rotterdam, he was beaten in the first round by Alex de Minaur. At the Qatar ExxonMobil Open, he lost in the first round to Emil Ruusuvuori. At the Dubai Championships, he was defeated in the first round by qualifier Taro Daniel. Representing Belgium in the Davis Cup tie against Finland, Goffin won both of his matches over Otto Virtanen and Emil Ruusuvuori. In the end, Belgium beat Finland 3–2. At the Indian Wells Masters, he was eliminated in the first round by Jordan Thompson in three sets. Seeded eighth at the Arizona Classic, he reached the quarterfinals where he lost to Liam Broady. In Miami, he was ousted from the tournament in the second round by 17th seed and world No. 19, Pablo Carreño Busta.

Goffin started his clay-court season at the Grand Prix Hassan II in Marrakesh, Morocco. Ranked No. 74, his lowest position since July 2014 when he was then world No. 78, he reached his first final since February 2021 by defeating qualifier, Damir Džumhur, in the first round, Pablo Andújar in the second round to reach the quarterfinals for his 300th match win, Roberto Carballés Baena in the quarterfinals, and Federico Coria in the semifinals. He won his sixth ATP singles title by beating Alex Molčan in the final. Due to winning the title in Marrakesh, his ranking improved from No. 74 to No. 47. Accepting a wildcard into the main draw at the Monte-Carlo Masters, he defeated last year semifinalist, Dan Evans, in the second round. He lost in the third round to eventual finalist Alejandro Davidovich Fokina. At the Serbia Open, he was beaten in the first round by eighth seed Filip Krajinović. Getting past qualifying at the Madrid Open, he made it to the third round where he lost in a three-hour and nine-minute three-set match to third seed, world No. 4, and five-time champion, Rafael Nadal, despite having four match points. As a result, he returned to the top 50 in the rankings at world No. 48 on 9 May 2022. At the Italian Open, he upset 11th seed and world No. 12, Hubert Hurkacz, in the first round for his first top-15 win of the season. He was defeated in the second round by Jenson Brooksby. Ranked No. 48 at the French Open, he defeated 24th seed and world No. 27, Frances Tiafoe, in the second round to reach the third round at this Major for the first time in 3 years. He lost in the third round to 12th seed and world No. 13, Hubert Hurkacz.

Goffin was forced to skip the beginning of the grass season due to a left leg injury he sustained after losing to Hurkacz at Roland Garros. Ranked No. 39, he returned to action during the week of June 13 at the Halle Open. He lost in the first round to world No. 1 and eventual finalist, Daniil Medvedev. After 3 years of absence, ranked No. 58 at Wimbledon, he beat 23rd seed and world No. 28, Frances Tiafoe, in the fourth round in five sets to reach the quarterfinals at this Major for the second time. He lost in the quarterfinals to ninth seed, world No. 12, and home favorite, Cameron Norrie.

Goffin started his US Open series in August at the Citi Open in Washington, D.C. He lost in the first round to American Jack Sock. At the National Bank Open in Montreal, he was ousted from the tournament in the first round by Albert Ramos Viñolas. Getting past qualifying at the Western & Southern Open, he lost in the first round to fellow qualifier Marcos Giron. Goffin played his final tournament before the final Grand Slam of the year at the Winston-Salem Open. He lost in the first round to eventual finalist Laslo Djere. At the US Open, he lost in the first round as well.

He qualified at the 2022 Astana Open as a lucky loser after the late withdrawal of Holger Rune. In the first round, he defeated top seed and World No. 1 Carlos Alcaraz in straight sets, earning Goffin his third career victory over a reigning World No. 1.

=== 2023: Wimbledon third round, out of top 100 ===
He skipped the 2023 Australian Open due to illness but won the Challenger title on home soil in Belgium at the 2023 BW Open as a wildcard dropping one set the whole week.

Goffin received a wildcard for the 2023 Wimbledon Championships where he reached the third round, returning to the top 100.

The Belgian finished the 2023 season out of the top 100 for the first time in 10 years at world No. 107.

=== 2024: Ilkley Challenger title, US Open third round ===
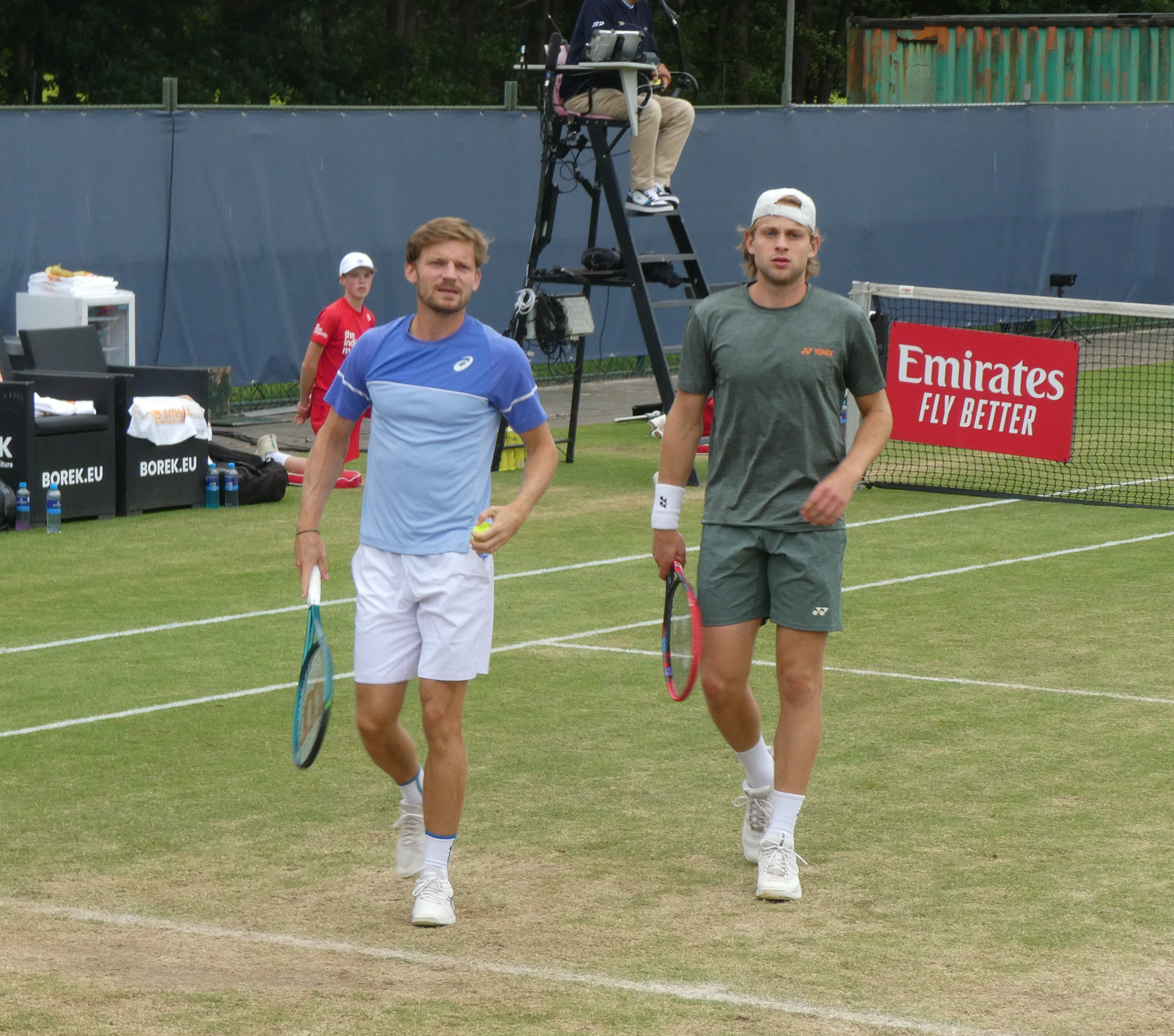
Goffin partnering Zizou Bergs in doubles at the 2024 Libéma Open

Having fallen out of the top 100, to start the year he needed to qualify for the main draw of the 2024 Australian Open, which he did by defeating Gabriel Diallo in the last round of qualifying. He lost to 21st seed Ugo Humbert in the first round. Goffin also qualified for the 2024 BNP Paribas Open defeating Maxime Cressy and Luca Nardi. He lost to Andy Murray in the first round.

In the beginning of his clay court season, Goffin qualified at the 2024 Grand Prix Hassan II and defeated Arthur Rinderknech. He qualified for the 2024 French Open making his 13th appearance and defeated wildcard Giovanni Mpetshi Perricard in five sets in the first round.

The Belgian entered the Libéma Open in both singles and doubles to start his preparation for Wimbledon. He lost his opening match in singles in straight sets. He partnered with countryman Zizou Bergs in doubles to reach the quarterfinals where they lost in a tight match to the eventual champions, the American pairing of Nathaniel Lammons and Jackson Withrow. Despite winning the 2024 Ilkley Trophy, he did not receive a wildcard for the 2024 Wimbledon Championships but climbed close to 30 positions up back in the top 100. He entered the All England Club main draw as a lucky loser but was defeated in a five-set thriller by Tomáš Macháč, after he was leading 5–0 in the fifth set.

At the 2024 Winston-Salem Open he reached the semifinals but lost to eventual champion Lorenzo Sonego in straight sets. At the US Open, he reached the third round with wins over 22nd seed Alejandro Tabilo and Adrian Mannarino. As a result, he returned to the top 65 in the rankings. He lost again to Tomáš Macháč in straight sets.

In Shanghai, Goffin made a second deep run, defeating James Duckworth, 15th seed Lorenzo Musetti, Marcos Giron and world no. 3 Alexander Zverev for his first top 10 win in two years to reach the quarterfinals. As a result, Goffin returned to the top 60 following the tournament's conclusion on 14 October 2024. His good form continued in Basel, where he reached again the quarterfinals, having entered the main draw as a lucky loser, with an upset over fifth seed Ugo Humbert. As a result, he reached the top 50 in the rankings.

=== 2025: Second win over Alcaraz, Miami third round ===
At the 2025 Abierto Mexicano Telcel Goffin defeated fifth seed Ben Shelton to reach the quarterfinals.

Goffin recorded his third straight top-3 win in Miami defeating Carlos Alcaraz in the second round, his second win over the world No. 3 following 2022 Astana.

=== 2026: Final year ===
On 27 March 2026, Goffin announced that the 2026 ATP season would be his last on tour.

== Personal life ==
Since 2018, Goffin has been in a relationship with Stephanie Tuccitto, whom he married on 18 September 2021. Their daughter, Emma, was born in 2024.

== Career statistics ==
=== Grand Slam tournament performance timeline ===
Key
W	F	SF	QF	#R	RR	Q#	DNQ	A	NH

(W) winner; (F) finalist; (SF) semifinalist; (QF) quarterfinalist; (#R) rounds 4, 3, 2, 1; (RR) round-robin stage; (Q#) qualification round; (DNQ) did not qualify; (A) absent; (NH) not held; (SR) strike rate (events won / competed); (W–L) win–loss record.
To avoid confusion and double counting, these charts are updated at the conclusion of a tournament or when the player's participation has ended.

Current through the 2026 Wimbledon Championships.

Tournament	2011	2012	2013	2014	2015	2016	2017	2018	2019	2020	2021	2022	2023	2024	2025	2026	SR	W–L	Win%
Australian Open	Q1	Q2	1R	A	2R	4R	QF	2R	3R	3R	1R	1R	A	1R	1R	A	0 / 11	13–11	54%
French Open	A	4R	1R	1R	3R	QF	3R	4R	3R	1R	1R	3R	1R	2R	A	Q2	0 / 13	19–13	59%
Wimbledon	Q3	3R	1R	1R	4R	4R	A	1R	QF	NH	A	QF	3R	1R	1R	Q1	0 / 11	18–11	62%
US Open	Q3	1R	1R	3R	3R	1R	4R	4R	4R	4R	1R	1R	Q1	3R	2R		0 / 13	19–13	59%
Win–loss	0–0	5–3	0–4	2–3	8–4	10–4	9–3	7–4	11–4	5–3	0–3	6–4	2–2	3–4	1–3	0–0	0 / 48	69–48	59%

=== Year-end championships (ATP Finals) ===
==== Singles: 1 (runner-up) ====
Result	Year	Tournament	Surface	Opponent	Score
Loss	2017	ATP Finals, UK	Hard (i)	(Bulgaria) Grigor Dimitrov	5–7, 6–4, 3–6

=== Masters 1000 tournaments ===
==== Singles: 1 (runner-up) ====
Result	Year	Tournament	Surface	Opponent	Score
Loss	2019	Cincinnati Masters	Hard	(Russia) Daniil Medvedev	6–7^{(3–7)}, 4–6

== Notes ==
Awards
Preceded by (Spain) Rafael Nadal	ATP Comeback Player of the Year; 2014	Succeeded by (France) Benoît Paire
