= Karen Khachanov =

Russian tennis player (born 1996)

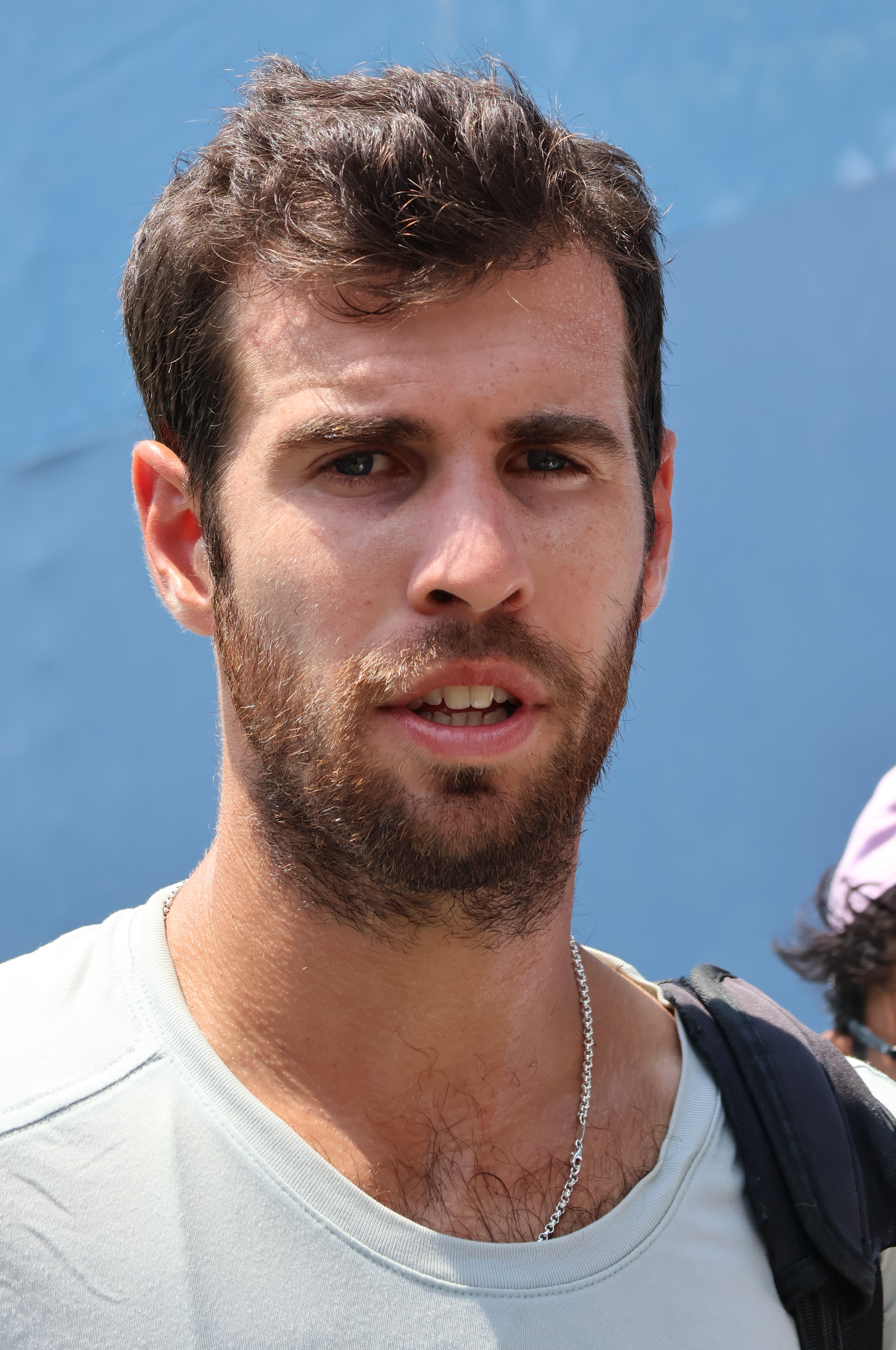
- Khachanov at the 2024 Washington Open
- Full name: Karen Abgarovich Khachanov
- Native name: Каре́н Абга́рович Хача́нов
- Country (sports): Russia
- Residence: Dubai, United Arab Emirates
- Born: 21 May 1996 (age 30) Moscow, Russia
- Height: 1.98 m (6 ft 6 in)
- Turned pro: 2013
- Plays: Right-handed (two-handed backhand)
- Coach: Vedran Martić; José Clavet; Evgeny Donskoy
- Prize money: US $26,359,068: 22th all-time in earnings

Singles
- Career record: 336–244 (57.9%)
- Career titles: 7
- Highest ranking: No. 8 (15 July 2019)
- Current ranking: No. 24 (9 November 2026)

Grand Slam singles results
- Australian Open: SF (2023)
- French Open: QF (2019, 2023)
- Wimbledon: QF (2021, 2025)
- US Open: SF (2022, 2026)

Other tournaments
- Tour Finals: Alt (2018)
- Olympic Games: F (2021)

Doubles
- Career record: 79–98 (44.6%)
- Career titles: 1
- Highest ranking: No. 53 (29 January 2024)
- Current ranking: No. 142 (24 August 2026)

Grand Slam doubles results
- Australian Open: 2R (2017)
- French Open: 2R (2017)
- US Open: 3R (2017)

Other doubles tournaments
- Olympic Games: 1R (2021)

Team competitions
- Davis Cup: W (2021)
Medal record
Men's tennis
Representing (Russia) ROC
Olympic Games
Silver medal – second place	2020 Tokyo	Men's singles
- Last updated on: 3 October 2026.

Karen Abgarovich Khachanov (Note: Russian: Каре́н Абга́рович Хача́нов, Armenian: Կարեն Աբգարի Խաչանով) (born 21 May 1996) is a Russian professional tennis player. He has been ranked by the Association of Tennis Professionals (ATP) as high as world No. 8 in singles, which he achieved on 15 July 2019, and No. 53 in doubles, attained on 29 January 2024. Khachanov has won seven ATP Tour singles titles, including an ATP Masters 1000 event at the 2018 Paris Masters. In doubles, he has won one title at the 2023 Madrid Open, with compatriot Andrey Rublev.

His most notable career achievement is a silver medal in singles at the 2020 Tokyo Olympics. He also has reached three major semifinals at the 2022 US Open, the 2023 Australian Open, and the 2026 US Open.

== Early life and background ==
Khachanov started playing tennis at the age of three in kindergarten when his parents put him into the tennis group. His father Abgar, an Armenian from Yerevan, played volleyball before studying medicine, while his mother, Nataliya, a Russian, also studied medicine. Khachanov's maternal grandfather was also half Armenian. Despite having been born in Russia, Khachanov tweeted: "I always say that I have Armenian roots."

He has a sister and a brother. His idols growing up were Marat Safin and Juan Martín del Potro, and favourite sports teams are Real Madrid and the Miami Heat. He decided to become a professional player at 12.

After Khachanov turned 15, he moved to Split, Croatia, where he trained under Vedran Martić, Goran Ivanišević's former coach. Later, he moved to Barcelona and was coached by Galo Blanco.

== Junior career ==
Khachanov won the Under-18 European Championship title in Switzerland in July 2013. Together with Andrey Rublev he won a silver medal in doubles at the 2014 Summer Youth Olympics. They lost in the final to Brazilian players Orlando Luz and Marcelo Zormann.

== Professional career ==
=== 2013–15: Davis Cup debut, first Future & Challenger titles ===
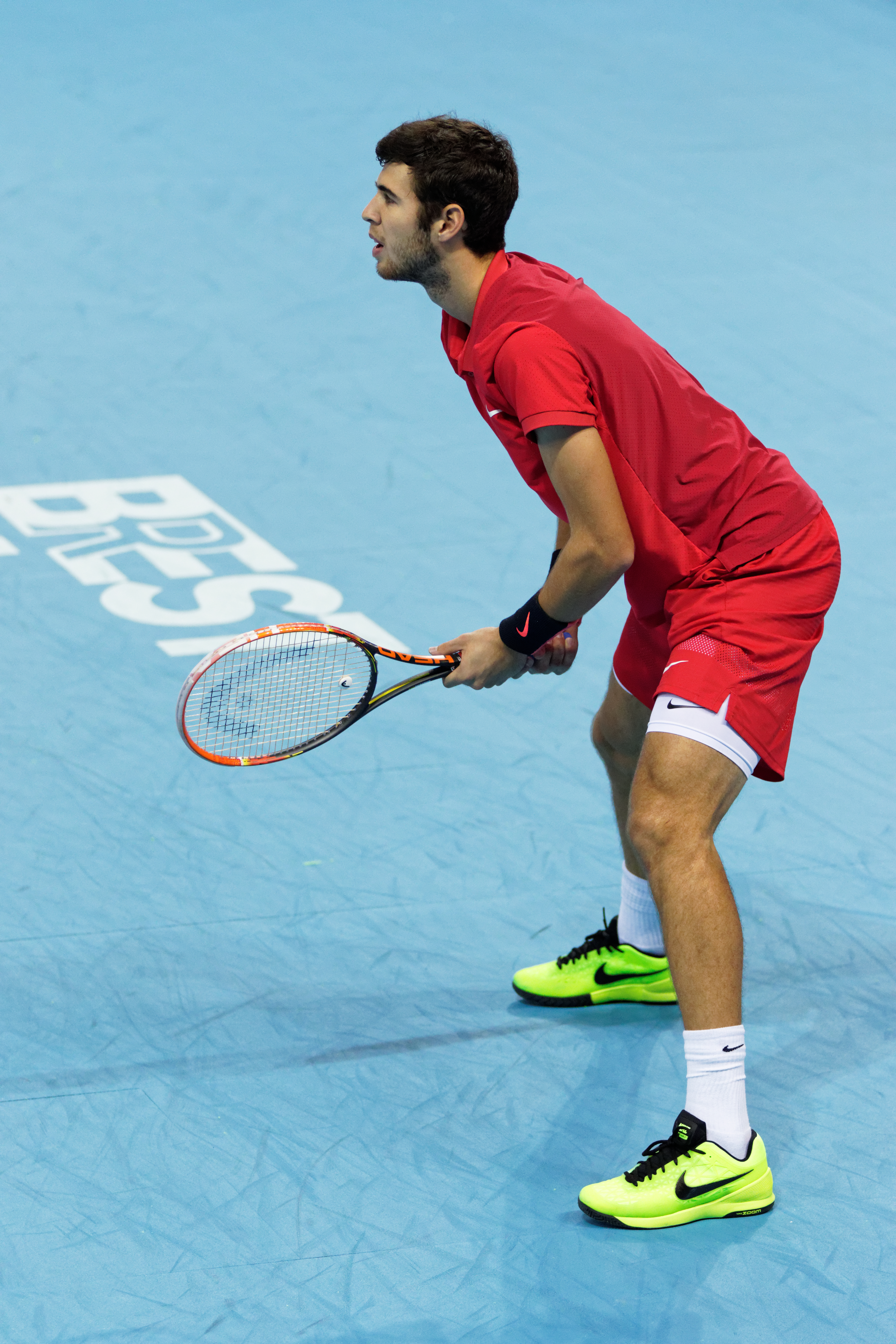
Khachanov at the 2015 Brest Challenger

Still as under 18, Khachanov made his ITF Circuit debut at the $15K event in Russia, losing his first match against compatriot Alexey Vatutin. In September of the following year, he got a wildcard for his first ATP Tour participation at the St. Petersburg Open. There he recorded his first win by defeating Victor Hănescu in the first round. He then faced Lukáš Rosol, but lost in straight sets. A month later he got another wildcard, for the Kremlin Cup. Things got even better there, as he defeated Albert Ramos Vinolas and top 30 Janko Tipsarević. In the next round he lost to Ivo Karlović. The following week he made his debut for Russia at the Davis Cup, and at age 17 years and 157 days he became the youngest Russian tennis player in the pro series, surpassing Mikhail Youzhny. There, he defeated Dean O'Brien of South Africa to help Russia advance in the 2013 Davis Cup Europe/Africa Zone Group I. He finished the season by playing at the two Challengers, reaching the quarterfinal in Geneva and then the first round in Helsinki.

After a slow start at the Chennai Open and two lower-ITF tournaments, Khachanov then played at the Davis Cup. He lost to Jerzy Janowicz of Poland in the first round of the 2014 Davis Cup Europe/Africa Zone Group I. He then continued with no success at one ITF event and Challenger events in Kazakhstan. However, he then made his Masters debut, after receiving a wildcard entry to the 2014 Miami Open, but lost in the first round to Daniel Gimeno Traver. In August, he achieved his first significant result, winning his first ITF title at the $15K event in Kaohsiung. Two weeks later, he won another ITF title at the $15K event in Mulhouse. For the second year in a row, he got a wildcard for the Kremlin Cup, but again lost in the first round.

Despite playing at a few ATP Tour events in previous years, in 2015 Khachanov played mostly at ITF and Challenger tournaments. In the first half of the year, he won two $10K/15K events in France, both in March. In April he reached the semifinal and won the title at the $15K events in Uzbekistan. After that at the Challengers, in June, he advanced to the quarterfinal in Fergana and then the semifinal in Marburg. His next step was Wimbledon, in his first Grand Slam qualification appearance. He lost in the first round of qualifications. Later, at the US Open, he also failed to qualify for the main draw, this time losing in the second round of qualifications. In mid-July, he faced Pablo Andújar in the second round of the 2015 Davis Cup Europe/Africa Zone Group I. He lost that match in three sets. In September, Khachanov won his first ATP Challenger Tour title in Istanbul, where he was unseeded. In the final he defeated top seed Sergiy Stakhovsky. He followed up this performance and finished the year with four consecutive Challenger quarterfinals, in Mons, Rennes, Brest and Mouilleron-le-Captif.

=== 2016: First ATP title, Major debut ===
Khachanov had a slow start in 2016 with only a first round at the Chennai Open and the final stage of Australian Open qualifications, as well as failing to reach the main draw at Open Sud de France and Open 13. His following matches were on the Challenger Tour, making it to the quarterfinal in Cherbourg and later the final of Jönköping and the quarterfinal in Kazan. He then entered the qualifications for Monte Carlo as his first clay Masters 1000 appearance. He lost to Taro Daniel in the first round. The following week he qualified for the Barcelona Open, beating Ramkumar Ramanathan and Marco Trungelliti. In his first-round match he came back from a set down to beat Aljaž Bedene. In the second round he beat fifth seed Roberto Bautista Agut, also in three sets. He eventually lost in the third round to the eleventh seed Alexandr Dolgopolov. After that he played at the Istanbul Open as a wildcard player. In his first match, he beat Aljaž Bedene for the second time in the month. In the following round, he lost to Albert Ramos Vinolas, despite winning the first set. He then at Challengers reached the quarterfinal in Qarshi and won the title in Samarkand the following week.

Playing in the qualification of the French Open, Khachanov completed his appearances at all four Grand Slams, but with no qualifications into the main draw. Two Challenger semifinals in Prostějov and Moscow followed, as well as another loss in the qualifications of Wimbledon. In July, at the Kitzbühel Open, he defeated Filippo Volandri and Philipp Kohlscreiber to reach his first ATP Tour quarterfinal since the 2013 Kremlin Cup, before losing to Dušan Lajović.

At the US Open, he made his main draw debut after passing the qualifications. In the first round he recorded his first Grand Slam win, over Thomas Fabbiano, but lost in the second round to Kei Nishikori. After that, he lost in the first round of the St. Petersburg Open to Alexander Zverev. However, he progressed further the following week at the 2016 Chengdu Open. He defeated João Sousa, Adrian Mannarino, Feliciano López and Victor Troicki to reach his first ATP Tour final. By reaching an ATP singles final, Khachanov became the first Russian in an ATP Tour final since Mikhail Youzhny, who beat David Ferrer in the final at the 2013 Valencia Open 500. Khachanov won his first ATP tournament there, beating Albert Ramos Viñolas in three sets. He finished the year with his first ATP 500 quarterfinal run at the Vienna Open, where he recorded wins over Andreas Seppi and Nikoloz Basilashvili, before Ivo Karlović defeated him.

=== 2017: First top 10 win, first Major fourth round ===
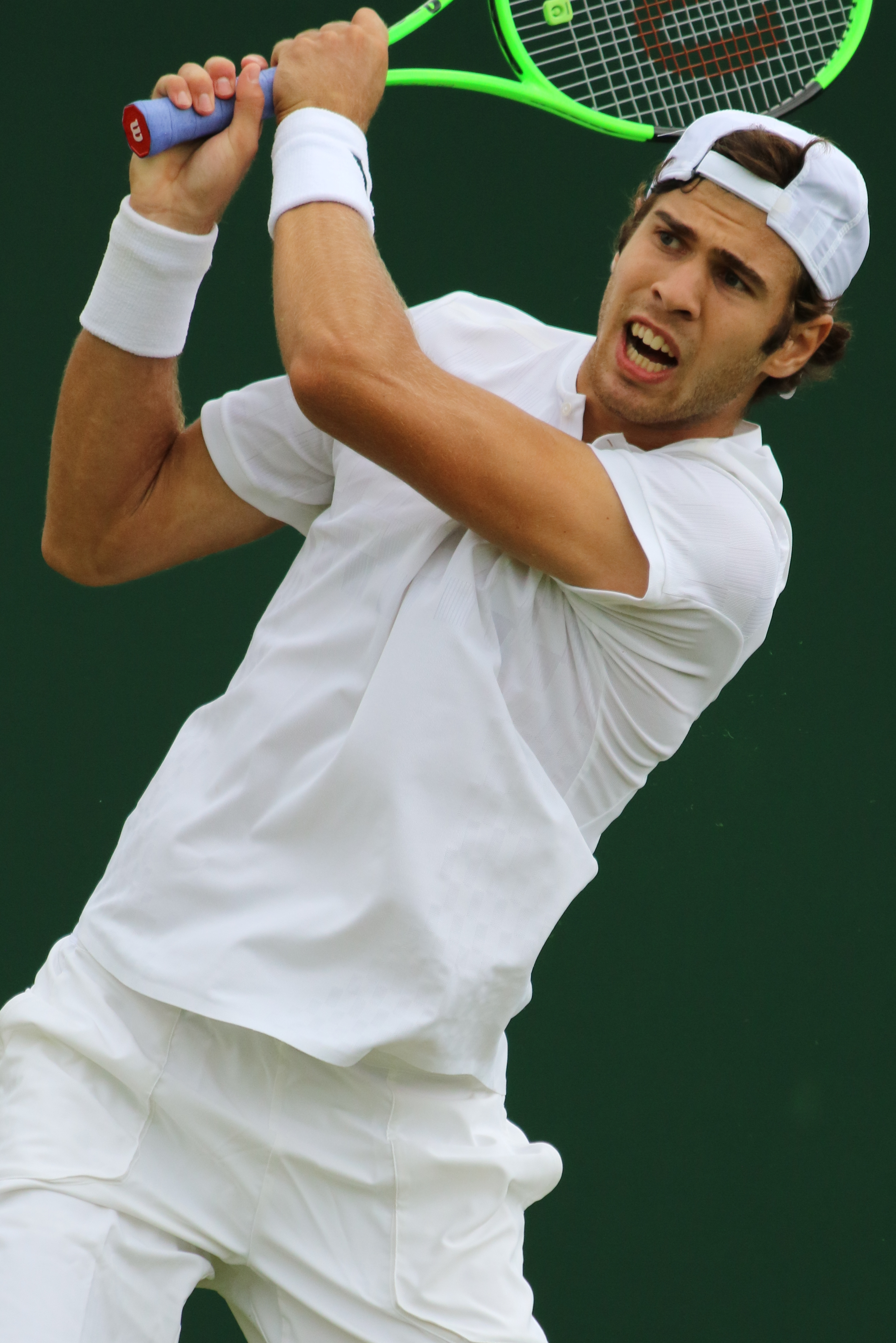
Khachanov at the 2017 Wimbledon Championships

Thanks to big progress in the past, he was now able to avoid qualifications. He started the year with a win at the Qatar Open, but then lost to Ivo Karlović in two tie breaks. He performed no better at the following Auckland Open, losing in the first round to Yen-Hsun Lu. He then made his main-draw debut at the Australian Open. His first opponent was Adrian Mannarino, whom Khachanov defeated in four sets. Against Jack Sock in the following round, he attempted to reach his first Grand Slam third round, but without success. His next step was participating at the Davis Cup against Serbia in the World Group. He lost his match against Viktor Troicki in five sets. Losses then continued for the next four tournaments: Open Sud de France, Rotterdam Open, Open 13 and Dubai Championships. At the Indian Wells, he passed the first round after defeating Tommy Robredo. In the following round, he lost to David Goffin.

In late April, he reached his first quarterfinal of the year, at the ATP 500 Barcelona. There he defeated Thomaz Bellucci, Pablo Cuevas and top 10 David Goffin before losing to Horacio Zeballos. A month later he advanced to another quarterfinal, at the Lyon Open. He followed up this win with another great performance at the French Open. Wins over Nicolas Jarry and top 30 players, Tomáš Berdych and John Isner, brought him to the fourth round at a Grand Slam for the first time in his career. He failed to reach his first Grand Slam quarterfinal, losing to Andy Murray.

He continued with good performances, reaching the semifinal of the Halle Open. There he achieved his first win on grass over Gilles Simon, and then recorded his second career top 10 win, after defeating Kei Nishikori. He lost to Roger Federer and failed to reach the final. This result ensured him a first Grand Slam seed place at the following Grand Slam at Wimbledon. There, he also had another great result, reaching his first third round, after wins over Andrey Kuznetsov and Thiago Monteiro. He then lost to Rafael Nadal. His successful journey then continued with two consecutive quarterfinals at the Båstad Open and the Hamburg Open. However, he then started to struggle with form. He was eliminated in the first round at both the Canadian Open and the US Open, but reached the third round of the Cincinnati Open. In September he played in the Davis Cup for the second time in a year. He played against Hungarian players, winning against Attila Balázs and losing to Márton Fucsovics. He then went to China, reaching the second round of the Chengdu Open and the China Open and losing in the first round of the Shanghai Masters. He then returned to Europe, but still with no success, with only first rounds of the Vienna Open and the Paris Masters. He finished the year with his debut at the Next Gen ATP Finals. He overcame Jared Donaldson, but lost to Daniil Medvedev and Borna Ćorić, so failed to pass the round robin group.

=== 2018: First Masters 1000 title ===
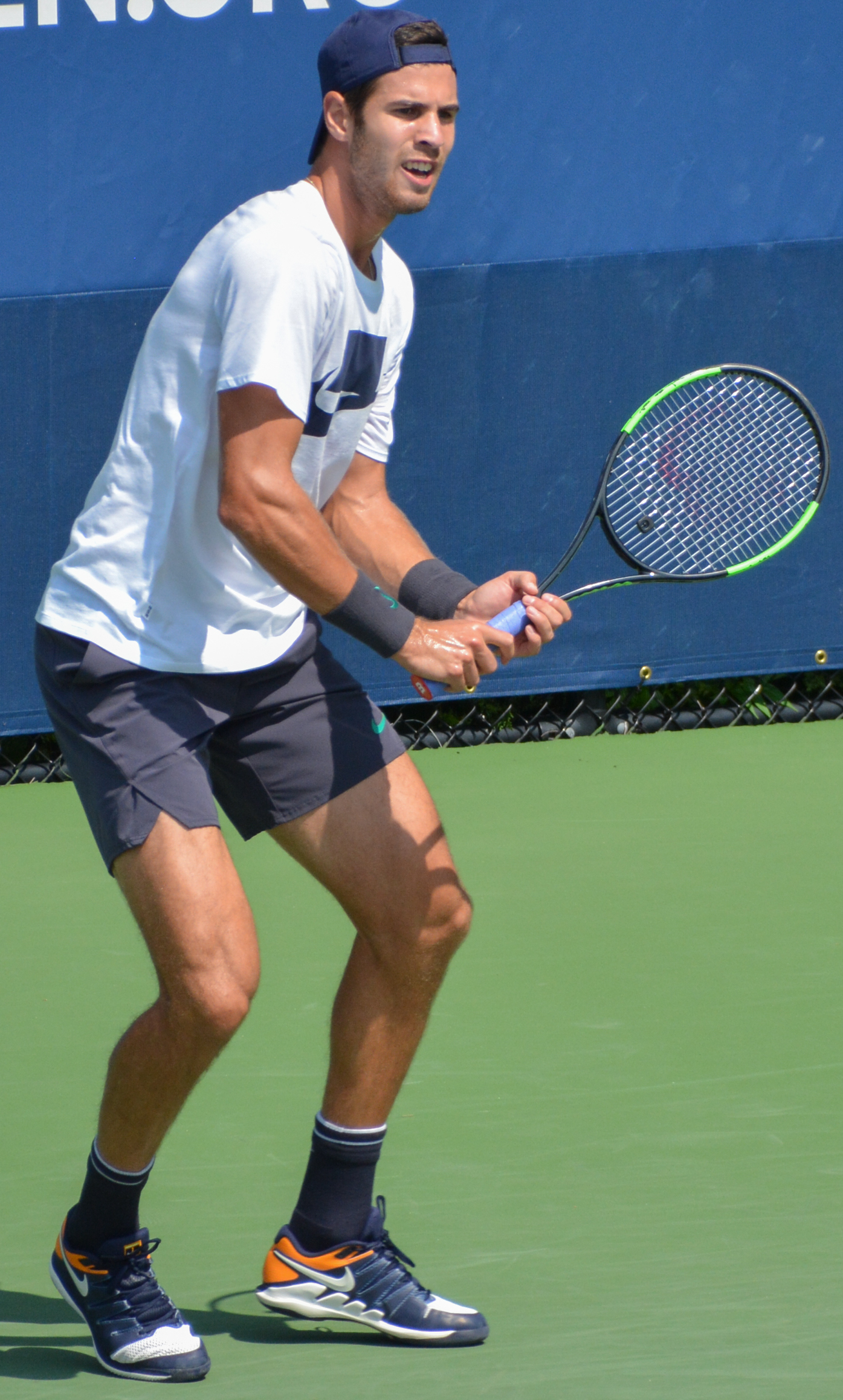
Khachanov at the 2018 US Open

Khachanov started the year at the Auckland Open, reaching the quarterfinal after wins over Yūichi Sugita and Pablo Cuevas, but then lost to Juan Martín del Potro. Next, he participated in the Australian Open, where he lost to del Potro in the second round. In February he first reached the quarterfinal of Open Sud de France, followed up with only a first round at the Rotterdam Open, but then he won his second ATP title at Open 13 in Marseille, France. In the semifinal he defeated former top 10 player Tomáš Berdych to reach final. To get the title, he needed to defeat Frenchman Lucas Pouille.

In the next three months he showed average results. In Dubai he reached the second round, then only the first round of Indian Wells and the third round of the Miami Open. However, he reached the final of the Miami Open in the doubles event, alongside Andrey Rublev, but they lost to Bob and Mike Bryan. Then the clay court season came, but he was still not showing good form. He reached the third rounds of Monte Carlo and the Barcelona Open, but only the first rounds of Madrid and Rome. However, his form peaked on time for the French Open, where he again reached the fourth round, defeating top 20 player Lucas Pouille in the third round, before losing to Alexander Zverev.

During the grass season, he played only two tournaments. First, he advanced to the quarterfinal of the Halle Open for the second year in a row. Second, he reached the fourth round of Wimbledon, but then lost to Novak Djokovic.

In the North American summer hard-court swing, Khachanov reached the semifinals of a Masters 1000 tournament for the first time in his career at the Canadian Open, losing to Nadal. He again lost to Nadal at the US Open in a marathon third round match.

Khachanov then helped Team Russia to progress through the 1st Round play-off of the Europe/Africa Zone Group I by winning both matches and securing Russia a place in the World Group. In Asia, Khachanov struggled to find form. He reached only the second rounds of Beijing and Shanghai. He then rebounded at the Kremlin Cup, winning his second ATP title of the season by defeating Adrian Mannarino in the final. In the semifinal he defeated his compatriot Daniil Medvedev.

Khachanov finished the year by claiming his first ATP Masters 1000 title at the Rolex Paris Masters, defeating Filip Krajinović, Matthew Ebden, world No. 9 John Isner (saving two match points), world No. 5 Alexander Zverev, world No. 8 Dominic Thiem and world No. 1 Novak Djokovic. He was the first tennis player representing Russia to win a Masters 1000 final since Nikolay Davydenko, who won the inaugural 2009 Shanghai Masters. No. 18 Khachanov was the lowest-ranked player to win a Masters 1000 title since Ivan Ljubičić took the 2010 Indian Wells Masters. As a result, Khachanov climbed to world No. 11 and was an alternate at the 2018 ATP Finals. He became the fifth Russian tennis player to win a Masters tournament after Marat Safin, Andrei Chesnokov, Yevgeny Kafelnikov and Nikolay Davydenko.

=== 2019: French Open quarterfinal, top 10 ===
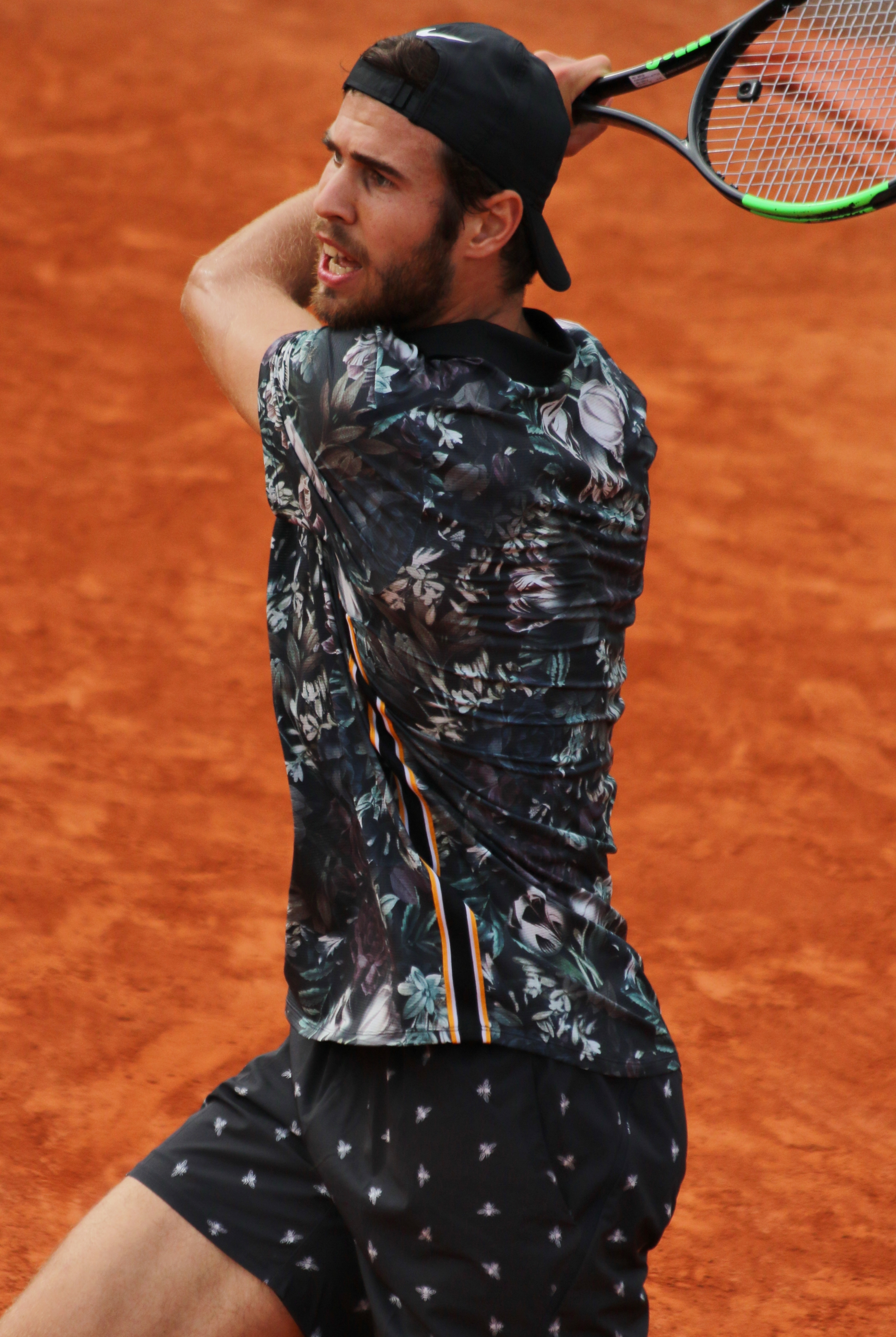
Khachanov at the 2019 French Open

Despite starting the season as the 11th ranked player in the world, Khachanov struggled to achieve any notable results for the first five months of the season. Leading up to the French Open, Khachanov's record for the year was ten wins and twelve losses, and he had failed to reach a single tournament semifinal.

At the French Open, Khachanov won his first three rounds to set up a last-16 encounter with Juan Martín del Potro. Khachanov beat del Potro for the first time to reach his first major quarterfinal, where he lost to Dominic Thiem. Khachanov's maiden Slam quarterfinal saw him enter the top-10 for the first time as world No. 9.

In August, Khachanov reached his first tournament semifinal of the year after beating Alexander Zverev in the quarterfinals of the Montreal Masters. In the semifinals, he was defeated by compatriot Daniil Medvedev.

After the Rogers Cup, Khachanov reached the semifinals of the China Open. He failed to defend his title at the Paris Masters, losing in the second round to Jan-Lennard Struff, and dropped out of the top 10.

=== 2020: ATP Cup semifinals, French Open fourth round ===
Khachanov entered the Auckland Open as third-seeded, losing the first match against John Millman.

He then joined team Russia, also consisting of Medvedev, Gabashvili and Kravchuk, at the ATP Cup. He beat four out of five players, with team Russia progressing to the semifinals, where they lost to eventual champion Serbia.

At the 2020 US Open, Khachanov beat Jannik Sinner, coming back from 2 sets down, then beat Andrey Kuznetsov, before losing to Alex de Minaur in the third round. In Rome, Khachanov lost in the first round to Casper Ruud. He came back to form in time for the French Open, where he reached the fourth round for a fourth consecutive year, beating Kamil Majchrzak, Jiří Veselý and Cristian Garín, before losing to world No. 1 Novak Djokovic.

=== 2021: Wimbledon quarterfinal, Olympic silver medalist ===
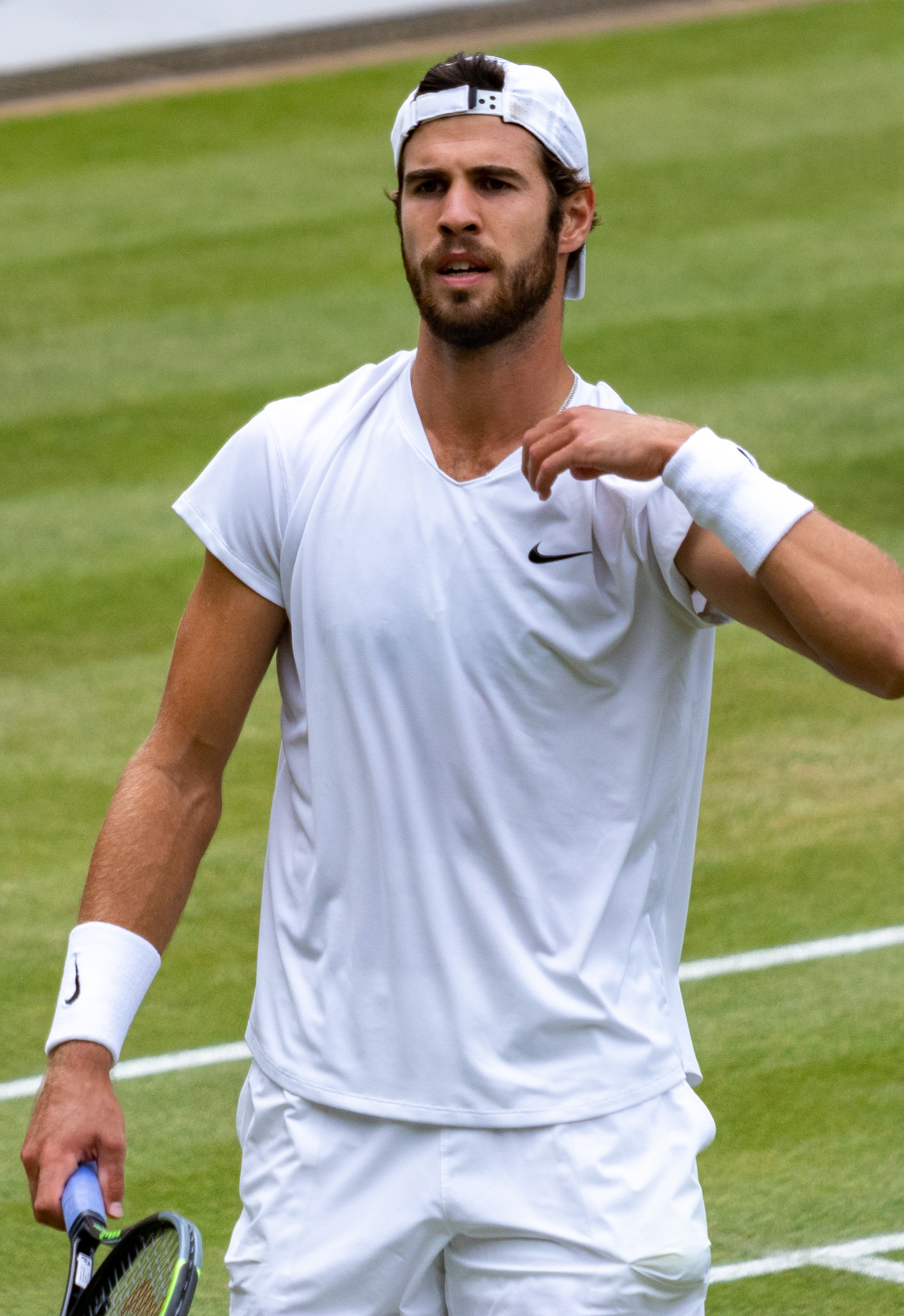
Khachanov at the 2021 Wimbledon Championships

At the 2021 Australian Open, Khachanov progressed to the third round for the third year in a row. He reached two semifinals, at the lead-up event to the AO at the 2021 Great Ocean Road Open, where he was defeated by eventual champion Jannik Sinner, and at the clay warm-up event to the French Open at the 2021 Lyon Open, where he was defeated by Cameron Norrie.

At the 2021 Wimbledon Championships he reached the fourth round for the second time. This marked the first time three Russian players reached the fourth round at the All England Club since 2006, when Elena Dementieva, Anastasia Myskina and Maria Sharapova made their run. He continued by reaching the quarterfinals for the first time in his career, defeating Sebastian Korda in a tight match that finished in a fifth set tiebreak. He then lost in another five-set match, against Denis Shapovalov.

At the Tokyo Olympics, Khachanov defeated Yoshihito Nishioka, James Duckworth, Diego Schwartzman and Ugo Humbert to reach the semi-finals. There, he defeated Pablo Carreño Busta in straight sets, to guarantee himself at least a silver medal. He lost to Alexander Zverev in the gold medal match.

=== 2022: US Open semifinal & back to top 20 ===
Khachanov started his 2022 season at the Adelaide International 1. Seeded second, he beat third seed, Marin Čilić, in the semifinals to reach his sixth ATP singles final. He lost in the final to top seed Gaël Monfils. Seeded third at the Adelaide International 2, he reached the quarterfinals where he was defeated by eventual finalist Arthur Rinderknech. Seeded 28th at the Australian Open, he made it to the third round where he was ousted from the tournament by sixth seed Rafael Nadal.

In February, Khachanov competed at the Rotterdam Open. He lost in the second round to sixth seed Cameron Norrie. Seeded sixth at the Qatar ExxonMobil Open, he upset fourth seed, Marin Čilić, in the quarterfinals. He fell in his semifinal match to second seed, Roberto Bautista Agut, in three sets. In Dubai, he lost in the second round to world no. 1 and five-time champion, Novak Djokovic. Seeded 25th at the Indian Wells Masters, he was defeated in the second round by American Jenson Brooksby. Seeded 23rd at the Miami Open, he was eliminated in the second round by American Tommy Paul.

Khachanov started his clay-court season at the Monte-Carlo Masters. He lost in the first round to 12th seed Diego Schwartzman. Seeded third at the Serbia Open, he reached the semifinals where he was defeated by World No. 1 Novak Djokovic. At the Madrid Open, he was beaten in the first round by Lucas Pouille in straight sets. In Rome, he swept past Pablo Carreño Busta to reach the third round where he was ousted by eventual finalist Stefanos Tsitsipas in three sets. At the French Open, he defeated Cameron Norrie to reach the fourth round of this tournament for a fifth time, but was outlasted by 6th seed Carlos Alcaraz in straight sets.

Khachanov played two tournaments in the grass swing. He reached the quarterfinals of both Libéma Open and Halle Open, losing to Félix Auger-Aliassime and Oscar Otte respectively. At the Hamburg Open, he lost to Alcaraz again in the quarterfinals.

Khachanov started the North American hard court swing at the Citi Open. He lost to eventual finalist Yoshihito Nishioka in the third round. Following early exits at both Canadian Open and Cincinnati Open, Khachanov reached the fourth round at the US Open defeating Jack Draper after he retired in the third set. He went one step further with a win over Pablo Carreño Busta, in a five sets match lasting over 3 hours, to reach the quarterfinals for the first time at this Major. Khachanov defeated Nick Kyrgios in five sets to reach his first career semifinal at a Major. In the semifinals, Khachanov lost to Casper Ruud in four sets.

In October, Khachanov reached the quarterfinals of Astana Open, where he lost in straight sets to an eventual champion Novak Djokovic. In receipt of a first-round bye in Antwerp, he lost to eventual finalist Sebastian Korda in the second round. It was followed by another early exit at the Erste Bank Open to Dan Evans in the second round.

=== 2023: Major & Masters semifinals, first title in 5 years, back to top 10 ===
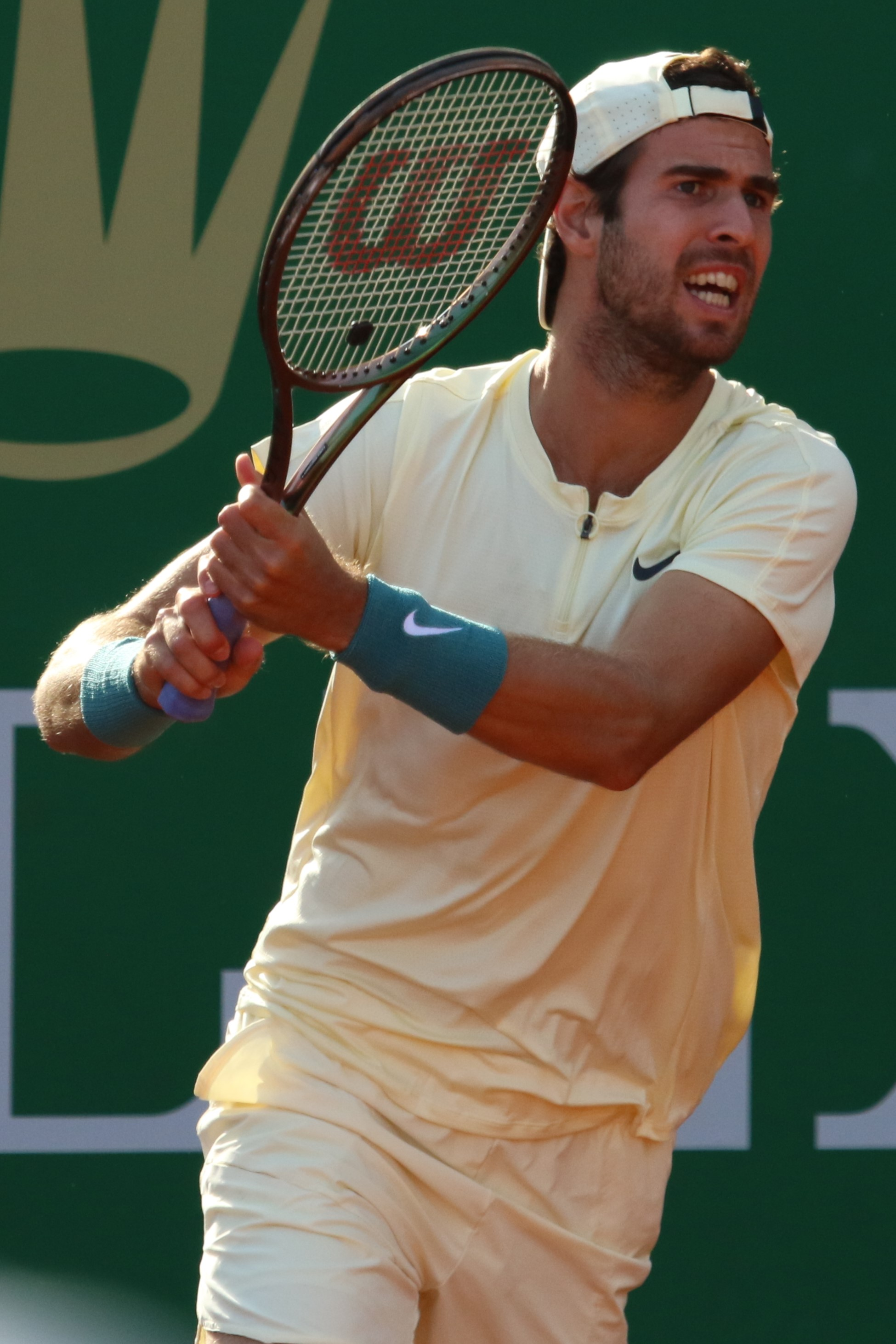
Khachanov at the 2023 Monte-Carlo Masters

Ranked No. 18 at the 2023 Australian Open he defeated three seeds in a row to reach the semifinals 16th seed Frances Tiafoe, 31st seed Yoshihito Nishioka and 29th seed Sebastian Korda in the quarterfinals after retirement. He moved back to the Top 15 to No. 13 in the rankings on 30 January 2023.

At the 2023 Miami Open he reached the quarterfinals with his first top-5 win for the season and first ever win against second seed Stefanos Tsitsipas. It was also his 11th top-10 career overall and first since Canada 2019 where he reached a Masters quarterfinal for the last time. He broke a 23-match losing streak against Top 10 players. Next he defeated 25th seed Francisco Cerundolo to reach his first Masters semifinal since 2019.

Khachanov began his European clay-court campaign at the Monte-Carlo Masters where he lost to fellow countryman Andrey Rublev in the fourth round. At the next Masters tournament, the 2023 Mutua Madrid Open, he reached the quarterfinals following wins over Thiago Monteiro, Roberto Bautista Agut, and Andrey Rublev before falling to top seed Carlos Alcaraz in straight sets. In doubles, he partnered with Rublev and the pair went on to win the title, their first as a pair. Following a quarterfinal showing at the 2023 French Open he returned to the top 10 in the singles rankings.

Khachanov missed 2023 Wimbledon because of a partial stress fracture in his sacrum S1 bone.

He returned to the US Open but lost in the first round to Michael Mmoh. At the next tournament, the 2023 Zhuhai Championships as the top seed, he recorded his first win since coming back from injury over qualifier Alex Bolt. He reached the final defeating two Americans sixth seed Mackenzie McDonald and fourth seed Sebastian Korda. In the final, he defeated eight seed Yoshihito Nishioka in straight sets to claim his first title in five years.

=== 2024: Two ATP titles ===
At the 2024 Australian Open, Khachanov reached the fourth round but lost to fourth seed and eventual champion Jannik Sinner. He won his sixth title at the 2024 Qatar ExxonMobil Open in February, defeating Jakub Menšík in the final.

In October, Khachanov won the 2024 Almaty Open in Kazakhstan, defeating Gabriel Diallo in the final to claim his seventh ATP Tour title. The following week he backed this great result by reaching back-to-back finals at the 2024 Erste Bank Open in Vienna with wins over qualifier Thiago Seyboth Wild, Brandon Nakashima, Matteo Berrettini and second seed Alex de Minaur. He lost the final to seventh seed Jack Draper in straight sets.

=== 2025: Masters 1000 final, second Wimbledon quarterfinal, back to top 10 ===
At the 2025 Wimbledon Championships, Khachanov made it to the quarterfinals, beating Mackenzie McDonald, Shintaro Mochizuki, Nuno Borges and Kamil Majchrzak before losing to 5th seed Taylor Fritz in 4 sets.

At the 2025 National Bank Open, Khachanov reached the final, defeating eighth seed Casper Ruud, Alex Michelsen and top seed Alexander Zverev. This was his third win against a top 3 player and was the second Masters 1000 singles final that he participated in, with the first being his win in 2018. He lost to Ben Shelton in the final.

=== 2026: Loss of form & second US Open semifinal ===
Khachanov at the 2026 Cincinnati Open

In February, Khachanov made it to the quarterfinals at the 2026 Qatar ExxonMobil Open, where he lost to Carlos Alcaraz in 3 sets. In May, he made it to the quarterfinals at the 2026 Italian Open, where he lost to Casper Ruud.

Prior to the US Open, Khachanov lost to Bernard Tomic in Los Cabos and had dropped to No. 50, his lowest ranking since June 2017.

In the US Open, Khachanov defeated Román Andrés Burruchaga in the first round. He then defeated No. 4 ranked player and No. 3 seed Félix Auger-Aliassime in the second round. In the third round, he then defeated Benjamin Bonzi. In the next round, he defeated No. 14 seed Learner Tien in five sets to reach the quarterfinals. He then made it past Alexander Blockx after a retirement in the third set. He then lost to top seed and eventual champion Alexander Zverev in the semifinals.

== Coaching team ==
Early in his career, Khachanov was coached by Igor Bitsenko in Moscow and Vedran Martić in Split, Croatia. In 2014 he joined 4Slam Tennis Academy led by Galo Blanco. Khachanov parted ways with Blanco in November 2017. He has been training for a few years now with his previous coach Vedran Martić. Currently, his other coaches are José Clavet and Evgeny Donskoy.

== Personal life ==
In April 2016, Khachanov married Veronika Shkliaeva, his childhood sweetheart, whom he had been dating since 2011. Their first child, a son, was born in 2019. Their second son was born in 2023. Fellow tennis player Ilya Ivashka is his brother-in-law, as their wives are twin sisters.

In March 2022, the Russian state-run RIA Novosti reported that, amid the 2022 Russian invasion of Ukraine, Khachanov had removed the Russian flag from his Instagram page.

=== Support for Armenians during the Nagorno-Karabakh conflict ===
During the 2023 Australian Open, Khachanov wrote messages on the television camera lens (traditionally signed by the winner following a match) expressing support for Armenians in the Republic of Artsakh during the blockade of Nagorno-Karabakh. Following this, the Azerbaijan Tennis Federation wrote a letter to the International Tennis Federation (ITF) calling for sanctions against Khachanov. Khachanov later stated he had not been discouraged by the ITF for his messages.

In March 2024, Khachanov participated in a charity exhibition match for Artsakh refugees at the Los Angeles Tennis Center with compatriot Andrey Rublev. The exhibition raised $100,000 and was preceded by a gala attended by Khachanov and Andre Agassi, who is also of Armenian descent.

== Endorsements ==
Khachanov has been endorsed by Nike for apparel and shoes, and Wilson for racquets. He has also been sponsored by Lavazza, Armani for luxury apparel, Cadillac Escalade for cars, and Rolex for watches. He was earlier endorsed by Mercedes-Benz and Head, for racquets.

== Career statistics ==
=== Grand Slam performance timeline ===
Key
W	F	SF	QF	#R	RR	Q#	DNQ	A	NH

(W) winner; (F) finalist; (SF) semifinalist; (QF) quarterfinalist; (#R) rounds 4, 3, 2, 1; (RR) round-robin stage; (Q#) qualification round; (DNQ) did not qualify; (A) absent; (NH) not held; (SR) strike rate (events won / competed); (W–L) win–loss record.
To avoid confusion and double counting, these charts are updated at the conclusion of a tournament or when the player's participation has ended.

Current through the 2026 US Open.

Tournament	2015	2016	2017	2018	2019	2020	2021	2022	2023	2024	2025	2026	SR	W–L	Win %
Australian Open	A	Q3	2R	2R	3R	3R	3R	3R	SF	4R	3R	3R	0 / 10	22–10	69%
French Open	A	Q2	4R	4R	QF	4R	2R	4R	QF	2R	3R	3R	0 / 10	26–10	72%
Wimbledon	Q1	Q3	3R	4R	3R	NH	QF	A (Note: Russian athletes were banned from competing following the 2022 Russian invasion of Ukraine.)	A	2R	QF	3R	0 / 6	18–7	73%
US Open	Q2	2R	1R	3R	1R	3R	1R	SF	1R	1R	2R	SF	0 / 10	16–11	52%
Win–loss	0–0	1–1	6–4	9–4	8–4	7–3	7–4	10–3	9–3	5–4	9–4	11–4	0 / 36	82–38	68%

=== Summer Olympics ===
==== Singles: 1 (silver medal) ====
Result	Year	Tournament	Surface	Opponent	Score
Silver	2021	Tokyo Summer Olympics	Hard	(Germany) Alexander Zverev	3–6, 1–6

=== ATP 1000 tournaments ===
==== Singles: 2 (1 title, 1 runner-up) ====
Result	Year	Tournament	Surface	Opponent	Score
Win	2018	Paris Masters	Hard (i)	(Serbia) Novak Djokovic	7–5, 6–4
Loss	2025	Canadian Open	Hard	(United States) Ben Shelton	7–6^{(7–5)}, 4–6, 6–7^{(3–7)}

==== Doubles: 3 (1 title, 2 runner-ups) ====
Result	Year	Tournament	Surface	Partner	Opponents	Score
Loss	2018	Miami Open	Hard	(Russia) Andrey Rublev	(United States) Bob Bryan (United States) Mike Bryan	6–4, 6–7^{(5–7)}, [4–10]
Loss	2019	Paris Masters	Hard (i)	(Russia) Andrey Rublev	(France) Pierre-Hugues Herbert (France) Nicolas Mahut	4–6, 1–6
Win	2023	Madrid Open	Clay	Andrey Rublev	(India) Rohan Bopanna (Australia) Matthew Ebden	6–3, 3–6, [10–3]

== Awards and honours ==
National

- The Russian Cup in the nominations:
  - Junior of the Year: 2013;
  - Male Player of the Year: 2018;
  - Olympians-2020;
  - Team of the Year: 2019, 2021.
- Sports title "Merited Master of Sports of Russia" (6 August 2021)
- Medal of the Order "For Merit to the Fatherland", 1st class (11 August 2021).
