= 2022 Novak Djokovic tennis season =

- Full name: Novak Djokovic
- Country: Serbia
- Calendar prize money: $9,934,582

Singles
- Season record: 42–7
- Calendar titles: 5
- Year-end ranking: No. 5
- Ranking change from previous year: ▼4

Grand Slam & significant results
- Australian Open: A
- French Open: QF
- Wimbledon: W
- US Open: A
- Other tournaments
- Tour Finals: W

Doubles
- Season record: 1–0
- Year-end ranking: –

The 2022 Novak Djokovic tennis season began on 21 February 2022, with the start of the Dubai Tennis Championships. During this season, Djokovic:

- Surpassed his record of 353 weeks as the ATP No. 1 to 373.
- Surpassed his records of 37 ATP Masters 1000 titles to 38 & finals reached from 54 to 56.
- Surpassed his record of 229 wins over top 10 ranked players to 240.
- Surpassed his record of 31 (previously tied with Federer) Grand Slam finals to 32.
- Surpassed his record of 28 grand slam first place seedings to 31.
- Became first player to record 80+ singles wins at all Grand Slams.
- Became first player to record 30+ singles wins at all ATP Masters 1000.
- Tied Federer for most ATP Finals titles at 6.
- Became record holder for the highest career winning percentage (minimum 500 wins) at 83.35% (1031–206 record).
- Lost the (previously tied with Federer & Nadal's) all-time record total of 20 men's singles major titles to Nadal (22).

== Yearly summary ==
=== Early hard court season ===
==== ATP Cup ====
Djokovic withdrew from the Serbian team taking part at the ATP Cup from 1 January in Sydney.

==== Australian Open ====
Djokovic received a COVID-19 vaccination exemption from Tennis Australia to enter into the Australian Open. The exemption was provided after a rigorous review process involving two separate independent panels of medical experts, including the Independent Medical Exemption Review Panel appointed by the Victoria Department of Health. The panels applied the guidelines set by the Australian Technical Advisory Group on Immunisation. The basis for the exemption was that Djokovic had contracted COVID-19 in the past 6 months. Djokovic's participation in the Australian Open was cast into doubt after the Australian Border Force questioned the basis for the exemption. He was detained by the Australian Border Force on 5 January, and his visa was cancelled on the same day, with plans for his deportation being put in place. His lawyers challenged the decision. The Federal Circuit and Family Court ruled against the government on procedural grounds and ordered his release from detention and directed the federal government to pay his legal expenses.

On 14 January 2022, Alex Hawke, the Australian Minister for Immigration, Citizenship, Migrant Services and Multicultural Affairs, exercised his ministerial powers under sections 133C(3) and 116(1)(e)(i) of the Migration Act 1958 to cancel Djokovic's visa, citing "health and good order grounds, on the basis that it was in the public interest to do so". Djokovic's application for judicial review in the Federal Court was unanimously dismissed by the full court with costs on 16 January. Djokovic said he was "extremely disappointed" with the decision but accepted the ruling, and flew out of Australia that night. "Lucky loser" Salvatore Caruso took his place in the Australian Open draw.

In late January, doubts continued to mount over the validity of the date of his COVID test. Nevertheless, Djokovic entered into the 2022 Dubai Tennis Championships, an ATP 500 tournament where he has been seeded first. The tournament is due to be held in February; vaccination is not a requirement for entry into Dubai.

==== Dubai Tennis Championships ====
Djokovic played his first tournament of the season in Dubai after his deportation from Australia. He defeated Lorenzo Musetti and Karen Khachanov in straight sets. He then lost in the quarterfinals to Jiří Veselý in straight sets, thus losing his number 1 ranking to Daniil Medvedev.

==== Indian Wells Open ====
Djokovic withdrew from the tournament due to COVID-19 vaccine mandate rules from entering the United States. Despite this, Djokovic regained the number 1 ranking after Gaël Monfils beat Daniil Medvedev in the third round.

==== Miami Open ====
Djokovic withdrew from the tournament due to vaccine mandate rules from entering the United States.

=== Clay court season ===
==== Monte-Carlo Masters ====
After getting a bye in the first round, Djokovic lost in the second round to eventual runner-up Alejandro Davidovich Fokina.

==== Serbia Open ====
In his first match he was down a set and a break to compatriot Laslo Đere, and 2 points from defeat in the second set tiebreak, but fought through to win in a final set tiebreak. In his quarterfinal match he came from a set and a break down to win for the second straight match against compatriot Miomir Kecmanović. In the semis he won a third straight match from a set down against Karen Khachanov to reach his first ATP final of 2022. In the finals he forced a third set from a set down for the 4th match in a row but ultimately ran out of gas and was bageled 0–6 in the final set. Rublev won the title, defeating Djokovic 6–2, 6–7^{(4–7)}, 6–0.

==== Madrid Open ====
Defeating Gaël Monfils for a record 18th time, Djokovic was supposed to play Andy Murray in the round of 16 but Murray withdrew due to food poisoning. He beat Hubert Hurkacz in the quarterfinals. In the semifinals he faced Carlos Alcaraz, who beat Nadal the day before. In a very tightly contested battle which lasted over 3 1/2 hours, eventual champion Alcaraz prevailed 7–5 in the third set tiebreak and won the match 6–7, 7–5, 7–6.

==== Italian Open ====
Djokovic defeated Aslan Karatsev, Stan Wawrinka, Félix Auger-Aliassime, Casper Ruud and Stefanos Tsitsipas, all in straight sets en route to winning the title, his first of 2022, 38th Masters 1000 title overall, and 6th in Rome.

==== French Open ====
Djokovic, the defending champion, cruised through the first 4 rounds against Nishioka, Molcan (coached by Marián Vajda, Djokovic's former coach), Bedene and Schwartzman without losing a set. He entered his quarterfinal match having won 22 sets in a row, where he faced Rafael Nadal. Nadal prevailed in a close four set battle that lasted over four hours, 6–2, 4–6, 6–2, 7–6^{(7–4)}, and went on to win his 14th French Open title (and 22nd overall Grand Slam) five days later, leaving Djokovic two behind the all-time lead. Djokovic lost the number 1 ranking to Medvedev after failing to defend the title.

=== Grass court season ===
==== Wimbledon ====
Djokovic entered the tournament as the three-time defending champion. In the first round he beat Soon-woo Kwon in 4 sets, cruised to the quarterfinals with straight set wins against Thanasi Kokkinakis and compatriot Kecmanović, and defeated Tim Van Rijthoven in the fourth round in 4 sets. In the quarterfinals he would complete a 7th comeback from two sets down to prevail in five sets against Jannik Sinner. In the semis he beat the British #1 Cameron Norrie in 4 sets from a set down. Djokovic faced Nick Kyrgios in the final, the Australian playing his first ever major final. Kyrgios entered the match 2–0 against Djokovic, having never lost a match, a set, or any service games to Djokovic. In a tight 4 set final, Djokovic fought from a set down to prevail in 4 sets, 4–6, 6–3, 6–4, 7–6, for his 7th Wimbledon title, just one behind Roger Federer, and 21st grand slam title, overtaking Federer, and putting him within one of Nadal's total. For the first time in his career Djokovic won a slam event four straight times (2018, 2019, 2021 and 2022; 2020 was cancelled due to the COVID-19 pandemic).

=== Fall hard court season ===
Djokovic was forced to withdraw from the Canadian Open in Montreal, Cincinnati Open in Cincinnati, and the US Open. He was not eligible to enter both Canada and the United States due to being unvaccinated as both countries mandated foreigners to be vaccinated to cross the border at the time of these tournaments.

==== Laver Cup ====
Djokovic won a doubles match alongside Matteo Berrettini, and a singles match against Frances Tiafoe. He lost to Auger-Aliassime in the second last singles match, and Team World went on to claim their first ever Laver Cup title, 13–8. This tournament even marked the retirement of Tennis legend and Djokovic's longtime rival Roger Federer, who played his last tournament.

==== Tel Aviv Open ====
Djokovic beat Pablo Andujar, Vasek Pospisil, Roman Safiullin and Marin Čilić to win the title without the loss of a set at the Tel Aviv Open.

==== Astana Open ====
Djokovic cruised past Cristian Garín, Botic van de Zandschulp and Karen Khachanov to reach the semis without losing a set. In the semis he faced Medvedev, who was two points from the win in the second set tiebreak which Djokovic won 8–6. Medvedev immediately retired from the match, telling Djokovic he sustained an adductor injury. Djokovic beat Tsitsipas in the final in straight sets for his 90th career title. With this win, he qualified for the 2022 ATP Finals, as he only needed to finish in the Top 20 of the Race to Turin, since he won a Grand Slam in 2022.

==== Paris Masters ====
Djokovic started as 6th seed. In opening 3 rounds he beat Maxime Cressy, Karen Khachanov and Lorenzo Musetti comfortably. In semifinals, he beat Stefanos Tsitsipas in third set tiebreaker to extend the masters finals record to 56. In final, he faced 19 year old Holger Rune who was in his first masters 1000 final. Rune won in three set to win his first masters title. It was the first time Djokovic lost a Masters 1000 final after winning the first set.

==== ATP Finals ====
Djokovic was put in the red group along with Stefanos Tsitsipas, Daniil Medvedev and Andrey Rublev. In the opening round, he beat Tsitsipas in 2 sets. In second round, he beat Rublev to qualify for semifinal for 11th time. In the final dead rubber, Djokovic took on Medvedev in a match that lasted 3hr 11mins. Djokovic was the only player who hadn't lost a match while reaching semifinals. In the semis, he beat Taylor Fritz in tight 2 sets. Djokovic remained unbeaten in the final beating world no.3 Casper Ruud. For winning the title unbeaten, Djokovic won $4,740,300 which is the most prize money for a single tournament in tennis history. Djokovic equaled Roger Federer's record by winning the title for 6th time. Djokovic also became the oldest winner of ATP finals at 35 years 6 months; the record was previously held by Federer at 30 years and 4 months. Djokovic also won the most prize money for 2022, and tied for first with the most titles in 2022 (5).

== All matches ==
This table lists all the matches of Djokovic this year, including walkovers (W/O)

Key
W	F	SF	QF	#R	RR	Q#	P#	DNQ	A	Z#	PO	G	S	B	NMS	NTI	P	NH

(W) winner; (F) finalist; (SF) semifinalist; (QF) quarterfinalist; (#R) rounds 4, 3, 2, 1; (RR) round-robin stage; (Q#) qualification round; (P#) preliminary round; (DNQ) did not qualify; (A) absent; (Z#) Davis/Fed Cup Zonal Group (with number indication) or (PO) play-off; (G) gold, (S) silver or (B) bronze Olympic/Paralympic medal; (NMS) not a Masters tournament; (NTI) not a Tier I tournament; (P) postponed; (NH) not held; (SR) strike rate (events won / competed); (W–L) win–loss record.
To avoid confusion and double counting, these charts are updated at the conclusion of a tournament or when the player's participation has ended.

=== Singles matches ===
Tournament	Match	Round	Opponent (seed or key)	Rank	Result	Score
ATP Cup; Sydney, Australia; ATP Cup; Hard, outdoor 1 – 9 January 2022
ATP Cup; Sydney, Australia; ATP Cup; Hard, outdoor 1 – 9 January 2022	Withdrew					
Australian Open; Melbourne, Australia; Grand Slam tournament Hard, outdoor 17 – 30 January 2022
Australian Open; Melbourne, Australia; Grand Slam tournament Hard, outdoor 17 – 30 January 2022	–					N/A
Dubai Tennis Championships; Dubai, United Arab Emirates; ATP 500; Hard, outdoor 21 – 26 February 2022
Dubai Tennis Championships; Dubai, United Arab Emirates; ATP 500; Hard, outdoor 21 – 26 February 2022	1 / 1189	1R	(Italy) Lorenzo Musetti (WC)	58	Win	6–3, 6–3
Dubai Tennis Championships; Dubai, United Arab Emirates; ATP 500; Hard, outdoor 21 – 26 February 2022	2 / 1190	2R	(Russia) Karen Khachanov	26	Win	6–3, 7–6^{(7–2)}
Dubai Tennis Championships; Dubai, United Arab Emirates; ATP 500; Hard, outdoor 21 – 26 February 2022	3 / 1191	QF	(Czech Republic) Jiří Veselý (Q)	123	Loss	4–6, 6–7^{(4–7)}
Indian Wells Masters; Indian Wells, United States; ATP 1000; Hard, outdoor 10 – 20 March 2022
Indian Wells Masters; Indian Wells, United States; ATP 1000; Hard, outdoor 10 – 20 March 2022	–					N/A
Miami Open; Miami Gardens, United States; ATP 1000; Hard, outdoor 21 March – 3 April 2022
Miami Open; Miami Gardens, United States; ATP 1000; Hard, outdoor 21 March – 3 April 2022	–					N/A
Monte-Carlo Masters; Monte Carlo, Monaco; ATP 1000; Clay, outdoor 10 – 17 April 2022
Monte-Carlo Masters; Monte Carlo, Monaco; ATP 1000; Clay, outdoor 10 – 17 April 2022	–	1R	Bye			
Monte-Carlo Masters; Monte Carlo, Monaco; ATP 1000; Clay, outdoor 10 – 17 April 2022	4 / 1192	2R	(Spain) Alejandro Davidovich Fokina	46	Loss	3–6, 7–6^{(7–5)}, 1–6
Serbia Open; Belgrade, Serbia; ATP 250; Clay, outdoor 18 – 24 April 2022
Serbia Open; Belgrade, Serbia; ATP 250; Clay, outdoor 18 – 24 April 2022	–	1R	Bye			
Serbia Open; Belgrade, Serbia; ATP 250; Clay, outdoor 18 – 24 April 2022	5 / 1193	2R	(Serbia) Laslo Đere	50	Win	2–6, 7–6^{(8–6)}, 7–6^{(7–4)}
Serbia Open; Belgrade, Serbia; ATP 250; Clay, outdoor 18 – 24 April 2022	6 / 1194	QF	(Serbia) Miomir Kecmanović (7)	38	Win	4–6, 6–3, 6–3
Serbia Open; Belgrade, Serbia; ATP 250; Clay, outdoor 18 – 24 April 2022	7 / 1195	SF	Karen Khachanov (3)	26	Win	4–6, 6–1, 6–2
Serbia Open; Belgrade, Serbia; ATP 250; Clay, outdoor 18 – 24 April 2022	8 / 1196	F	Andrey Rublev (2)	8	Loss	2–6, 7–6^{(7–4)}, 0–6
Madrid Open; Madrid, Spain; ATP 1000; Clay, outdoor 2 – 8 May 2022
Madrid Open; Madrid, Spain; ATP 1000; Clay, outdoor 2 – 8 May 2022	–	1R	Bye			
Madrid Open; Madrid, Spain; ATP 1000; Clay, outdoor 2 – 8 May 2022	9 / 1197	2R	(France) Gaël Monfils	21	Win	6–3, 6–2
Madrid Open; Madrid, Spain; ATP 1000; Clay, outdoor 2 – 8 May 2022	–	3R	(United Kingdom) Andy Murray (WC)	78	Walkover	N/A
Madrid Open; Madrid, Spain; ATP 1000; Clay, outdoor 2 – 8 May 2022	10 / 1198	QF	(Poland) Hubert Hurkacz (12)	14	Win	6–3, 6–4
Madrid Open; Madrid, Spain; ATP 1000; Clay, outdoor 2 – 8 May 2022	11 / 1199	SF	(Spain) Carlos Alcaraz (7)	9	Loss	7–6^{(7–5)}, 5–7, 6–7^{(5–7)}
Italian Open; Rome, Italy; ATP 1000; Clay, outdoor 8 – 15 May 2022
Italian Open; Rome, Italy; ATP 1000; Clay, outdoor 8 – 15 May 2022	–	1R	Bye			
Italian Open; Rome, Italy; ATP 1000; Clay, outdoor 8 – 15 May 2022	12 / 1200	2R	Aslan Karatsev	35	Win	6–3, 6–2
Italian Open; Rome, Italy; ATP 1000; Clay, outdoor 8 – 15 May 2022	13 / 1201	3R	(Switzerland) Stan Wawrinka (PR)	361	Win	6–2, 6–2
Italian Open; Rome, Italy; ATP 1000; Clay, outdoor 8 – 15 May 2022	14 / 1202	QF	(Canada) Félix Auger-Aliassime (8)	9	Win	7–5, 7–6^{(7–1)}
Italian Open; Rome, Italy; ATP 1000; Clay, outdoor 8 – 15 May 2022	15 / 1203	SF	(Norway) Casper Ruud (5)	10	Win	6–4, 6–3
Italian Open; Rome, Italy; ATP 1000; Clay, outdoor 8 – 15 May 2022	16 / 1204	W	(Greece) Stefanos Tsitsipas (4)	5	Win (1)	6–0, 7–6^{(7–5)}
French Open; Paris, France; Grand Slam tournament Clay, outdoor 22 May – 5 June 2022
French Open; Paris, France; Grand Slam tournament Clay, outdoor 22 May – 5 June 2022	17 / 1205	1R	(Japan) Yoshihito Nishioka	99	Win	6–3, 6–1, 6–0
French Open; Paris, France; Grand Slam tournament Clay, outdoor 22 May – 5 June 2022	18 / 1206	2R	(Slovakia) Alex Molčan	38	Win	6–2, 6–3, 7–6^{(7–4)}
French Open; Paris, France; Grand Slam tournament Clay, outdoor 22 May – 5 June 2022	19 / 1207	3R	(Slovenia) Aljaž Bedene (PR)	194	Win	6–3, 6–3, 6–2
French Open; Paris, France; Grand Slam tournament Clay, outdoor 22 May – 5 June 2022	20 / 1208	4R	(Argentina) Diego Schwartzman (15)	16	Win	6–1, 6–3, 6–3
French Open; Paris, France; Grand Slam tournament Clay, outdoor 22 May – 5 June 2022	21 / 1209	QF	(Spain) Rafael Nadal (5)	5	Loss	2–6, 6–4, 2–6, 6–7^{(4–7)}
Wimbledon Championships; London, United Kingdom; Grand Slam tournament Grass, outdoor 27 June – 10 July 2022
Wimbledon Championships; London, United Kingdom; Grand Slam tournament Grass, outdoor 27 June – 10 July 2022	22 / 1210	1R	(South Korea) Kwon Soon-woo	81	Win	6–3, 3–6, 6–3, 6–4
Wimbledon Championships; London, United Kingdom; Grand Slam tournament Grass, outdoor 27 June – 10 July 2022	23 / 1211	2R	(Australia) Thanasi Kokkinakis	79	Win	6–1, 6–4, 6–2
Wimbledon Championships; London, United Kingdom; Grand Slam tournament Grass, outdoor 27 June – 10 July 2022	24 / 1212	3R	(Serbia) Miomir Kecmanović (25)	30	Win	6–0, 6–3, 6–4
Wimbledon Championships; London, United Kingdom; Grand Slam tournament Grass, outdoor 27 June – 10 July 2022	25 / 1213	4R	(Netherlands) Tim van Rijthoven (WC)	104	Win	6–2, 4–6, 6–1, 6–2
Wimbledon Championships; London, United Kingdom; Grand Slam tournament Grass, outdoor 27 June – 10 July 2022	26 / 1214	QF	(Italy) Jannik Sinner (10)	13	Win	5–7, 2–6, 6–3, 6–2, 6–2
Wimbledon Championships; London, United Kingdom; Grand Slam tournament Grass, outdoor 27 June – 10 July 2022	27 / 1215	SF	(United Kingdom) Cameron Norrie (9)	12	Win	2–6, 6–3, 6–2, 6–4
Wimbledon Championships; London, United Kingdom; Grand Slam tournament Grass, outdoor 27 June – 10 July 2022	28 / 1216	W	(Australia) Nick Kyrgios	40	Win (2)	4–6, 6–3, 6–4, 7–6^{(7–3)}
Canadian Open; Montreal, Canada; ATP 1000; Hard, outdoor 7 – 14 August 2022
Canadian Open; Montreal, Canada; ATP 1000; Hard, outdoor 7 – 14 August 2022	–					N/A
Cincinnati Masters; Cincinnati, United States; ATP 1000; Hard, outdoor 14 – 21 August 2022
Cincinnati Masters; Cincinnati, United States; ATP 1000; Hard, outdoor 14 – 21 August 2022	–					N/A
US Open; New York City, United States; Grand Slam tournament Hard, outdoor 29 August – 11 September 2022
US Open; New York City, United States; Grand Slam tournament Hard, outdoor 29 August – 11 September 2022	–					N/A
Laver Cup; London, United Kingdom; Laver Cup; Hard, indoor 23 – 25 September 2022
Laver Cup; London, United Kingdom; Laver Cup; Hard, indoor 23 – 25 September 2022	29 / 1217	Day 2	(United States) Frances Tiafoe	19	Win	6–1, 6–3
Laver Cup; London, United Kingdom; Laver Cup; Hard, indoor 23 – 25 September 2022	30 / 1218	Day 3	(Canada) Félix Auger-Aliassime	13	Loss	3–6, 6–7^{(3–7)}
Tel Aviv Open; Tel Aviv, Israel; ATP 250; Hard, indoor 26 September – 2 October 2022
Tel Aviv Open; Tel Aviv, Israel; ATP 250; Hard, indoor 26 September – 2 October 2022	–	1R	Bye			
Tel Aviv Open; Tel Aviv, Israel; ATP 250; Hard, indoor 26 September – 2 October 2022	31 / 1219	2R	(Spain) Pablo Andújar	115	Win	6–0, 6–3
Tel Aviv Open; Tel Aviv, Israel; ATP 250; Hard, indoor 26 September – 2 October 2022	32 / 1220	QF	(Canada) Vasek Pospisil (LL)	149	Win	7–6^{(7–5)}, 6–3
Tel Aviv Open; Tel Aviv, Israel; ATP 250; Hard, indoor 26 September – 2 October 2022	33 / 1221	SF	Roman Safiullin	104	Win	6–1, 7–6^{(7–3)}
Tel Aviv Open; Tel Aviv, Israel; ATP 250; Hard, indoor 26 September – 2 October 2022	34 / 1222	W	(Croatia) Marin Čilić (2)	16	Win (3)	6–3, 6–4
Astana Open; Astana, Kazakhstan; ATP 500; Hard, indoor 3 – 9 October 2022
Astana Open; Astana, Kazakhstan; ATP 500; Hard, indoor 3 – 9 October 2022	35 / 1223	1R	(Chile) Cristian Garín	81	Win	6–1, 6–1
Astana Open; Astana, Kazakhstan; ATP 500; Hard, indoor 3 – 9 October 2022	36 / 1224	2R	(Netherlands) Botic van de Zandschulp	34	Win	6–3, 6–1
Astana Open; Astana, Kazakhstan; ATP 500; Hard, indoor 3 – 9 October 2022	37 / 1225	QF	Karen Khachanov	18	Win	6–4, 6–3
Astana Open; Astana, Kazakhstan; ATP 500; Hard, indoor 3 – 9 October 2022	38 / 1226	SF	Daniil Medvedev (2)	4	Win	4–6, 7–6^{(8–6)}, ret.
Astana Open; Astana, Kazakhstan; ATP 500; Hard, indoor 3 – 9 October 2022	39 / 1227	W	(Greece) Stefanos Tsitsipas (3)	6	Win (4)	6–3, 6–4
Paris Masters; Paris, France; ATP 1000; Hard, indoor 31 October – 6 November 2022
Paris Masters; Paris, France; ATP 1000; Hard, indoor 31 October – 6 November 2022	–	1R	Bye			
Paris Masters; Paris, France; ATP 1000; Hard, indoor 31 October – 6 November 2022	40 / 1228	2R	(United States) Maxime Cressy	34	Win	7–6^{(7–1)}, 6–4
Paris Masters; Paris, France; ATP 1000; Hard, indoor 31 October – 6 November 2022	41 / 1229	3R	Karen Khachanov	19	Win	6–4, 6–1
Paris Masters; Paris, France; ATP 1000; Hard, indoor 31 October – 6 November 2022	42 / 1230	QF	(Italy) Lorenzo Musetti	23	Win	6–0, 6–3
Paris Masters; Paris, France; ATP 1000; Hard, indoor 31 October – 6 November 2022	43 / 1231	SF	(Greece) Stefanos Tsitsipas (5)	5	Win	6–2, 3–6, 7–6^{(7–4)}
Paris Masters; Paris, France; ATP 1000; Hard, indoor 31 October – 6 November 2022	44 / 1232	F	(Denmark) Holger Rune	18	Loss	6–3, 3–6, 5–7
ATP Finals; Turin, Italy; ATP Finals; Hard, indoor 13 – 20 November 2022
ATP Finals; Turin, Italy; ATP Finals; Hard, indoor 13 – 20 November 2022	45 / 1233	RR	(Greece) Stefanos Tsitsipas (2)	3	Win	6–4, 7–6^{(7–4)}
ATP Finals; Turin, Italy; ATP Finals; Hard, indoor 13 – 20 November 2022	46 / 1234	RR	Andrey Rublev (6)	7	Win	6–4, 6–1
ATP Finals; Turin, Italy; ATP Finals; Hard, indoor 13 – 20 November 2022	47 / 1235	RR	Daniil Medvedev (4)	5	Win	6–3, 6–7^{(5–7)}, 7–6^{(7–2)}
ATP Finals; Turin, Italy; ATP Finals; Hard, indoor 13 – 20 November 2022	48 / 1236	SF	(United States) Taylor Fritz (8)	9	Win	7–6^{(7–5)}, 7–6^{(8–6)}
ATP Finals; Turin, Italy; ATP Finals; Hard, indoor 13 – 20 November 2022	49 / 1237	W	(Norway) Casper Ruud (3)	4	Win (5)	7–5, 6–3

=== Doubles matches ===
Tournament	Match	Round	Opponents (seed or key)	Ranks	Result	Score
ATP Cup; Melbourne, Australia; ATP Cup; Hard, outdoor 1 – 9 January 2022
ATP Cup; Melbourne, Australia; ATP Cup; Hard, outdoor 1 – 9 January 2022	Withdrew					
Laver Cup; London, United Kingdom; Laver Cup; Hard, indoor 23 – 25 September 2022; Partner: (Italy) Matteo Berrettini
Laver Cup; London, United Kingdom; Laver Cup; Hard, indoor 23 – 25 September 2022; Partner: (Italy) Matteo Berrettini	1 / 138	Day 2	(Australia) Alex de Minaur / (United States) Jack Sock	185 / 43	Win	7–5, 6–2
Tel Aviv Open; Tel Aviv, Israel; ATP 250; Hard, indoor 26 September – 2 October 2022; Partner: (Israel) Jonathan Erlich
Tel Aviv Open; Tel Aviv, Israel; ATP 250; Hard, indoor 26 September – 2 October 2022; Partner: (Israel) Jonathan Erlich	–	1R	(Netherlands) Sander Arends / (Netherlands) Bart Stevens (PR)	143 / 123	walkover	N/A

== Exhibition matches ==
=== Singles ===
Tournament	Match	Round	Opponent (seed or key)	Rank	Result	Score
Hurlingham Tennis Classic; London, United Kingdom Grass, outdoor 22 – 24 June 2022
Hurlingham Tennis Classic; London, United Kingdom Grass, outdoor 22 – 24 June 2022	1	PO	(Canada) Félix Auger-Aliassime	9	Win	6–2, 6–1
Hurlingham Tennis Classic; London, United Kingdom Grass, outdoor 22 – 24 June 2022	–	PO	(Australia) Alexei Popyrin	83	walkover	N/A

== Schedule ==
Per Novak Djokovic, this is his current 2022 schedule (subject to change).

=== Singles schedule ===
Date	Tournament	Location	Tier	Surface	Prev. result	Prev. points	New points	Result
1 January 2022– 9 January 2022	ATP Cup	Sydney (AUS)	ATP Cup	Hard	RR	140 (665 (Note: Points carried over due to the Best of 24-month ranking being extended through and including the week of 1 March 2021.))	0	Withdrew
17 January 2022– 30 January 2022	Australian Open	Melbourne (AUS)	Grand Slam	Hard	W	2000	0	Withdrew
21 February 2022– 26 February 2022	Dubai Tennis Championships	Dubai (UAE)	500 Series	Hard	W	0 (500)	90	Quarterfinals (lost to Jiří Veselý, 4–6, 6–7^{(4–7)})
10 March 2022– 20 March 2022	Indian Wells Masters	Indian Wells (USA)	Masters 1000	Hard	A	0	0	Withdrew
23 March 2022– 3 April 2022	Miami Open	Miami Gardens (USA)	Masters 1000	Hard	R16	0 (45 (Note: Points carried over due to the Best of 24-month ranking being used for events between 4 March – 5 August 2019, that were not played in 2020, but weighted at 50%.))	0	Withdrew
10 April 2022– 17 April 2022	Monte-Carlo Masters	Roquebrune-Cap-Martin (FRA)	Masters 1000	Clay	R16	90 (90)	10	Second round (lost to Alejandro Davidovich Fokina, 3–6, 7–6^{(7–5)}, 1–6)
18 April 2022– 24 April 2022	Serbia Open	Belgrade (SRB)	250 Series	Clay	SF	90	150	Final (lost to Andrey Rublev, 2–6, 7–6^{(7–4)}, 0–6)
2 May 2022– 8 May 2022	Madrid Open	Madrid (ESP)	Masters 1000	Clay	W	0 (500)	360	Semifinals (lost to Carlos Alcaraz, 7–6^{(7–5)}, 5–7, 6–7^{(5–7)})
8 May 2022– 15 May 2022	Italian Open	Rome (ITA)	Masters 1000	Clay	F	600	1000	Champion (defeated Stefanos Tsitsipas, 6–0, 7–6^{(7–5)})
N/A	Belgrade Open	Belgrade (SRB)	250 Series	Clay	W	250	0	Not held
22 May 2022– 5 June 2022	French Open	Paris (FRA)	Grand Slam	Clay	W	2000	360	Quarterfinals (lost to Rafael Nadal, 2–6, 6–4, 2–6, 6–7^{(4–7)})
27 June 2022– 10 July 2022	Wimbledon	London (GBR)	Grand Slam	Grass	W	2000	0 (Note: Removal Of ATP Rankings Points From 2022 Wimbledon.)	Champion (defeated Nick Kyrgios, 4–6, 6–3, 6–4, 7–6^{(7–3)})
7 August 2022– 14 August 2022	Canadian Open	Montreal (CAN)	Masters 1000	Hard	A	0	0	Withdrew
14 August 2022– 21 August 2022	Cincinnati Masters	Cincinnati (USA)	Masters 1000	Hard	A	0	0	Withdrew
29 August 2022– 11 September 2022	US Open	New York (USA)	Grand Slam	Hard	F	1200	0	Withdrew
26 September 2022– 2 October 2022	Tel Aviv Open	Tel Aviv (ISR)	250 Series	Hard (i)	N/A	0	250	Champion (defeated Marin Čilić, 6–3, 6–4)
3 October 2022– 9 October 2022	Astana Open	Astana (KAZ)	500 Series	Hard (i)	N/A	0	500	Champion (defeated Stefanos Tsitsipas, 6–3, 6–4)
31 October 2022– 6 November 2022	Paris Masters	Paris (FRA)	Masters 1000	Hard (i)	W	1000	600	Final (lost to Holger Rune, 6–3, 3–6, 5–7)
13 November 2022– 20 November 2022	ATP Finals	Turin (ITA)	Tour Finals	Hard (i)	SF	600	1500	Champion (defeated Casper Ruud, 7–5, 6–3)
Total year-end points						11540	4820	▼6720 difference

=== Doubles schedule ===
Date	Tournament	Location	Tier	Surface	Prev. result	Prev. points	New points	Result
1 January 2022– 9 January 2022	ATP Cup	Sydney (AUS)	ATP Cup	Hard	RR	120	0	Withdrew
20 June 2022– 26 June 2022	Mallorca Open	Santa Ponsa (ESP)	ATP Tour 250	Grass	F	90	0	Withdrew
26 September 2022– 2 October 2022	Tel Aviv Open	Tel Aviv (ISR)	ATP Tour 250	Hard (i)	N/A	0	0	Withdrew
31 October 2022– 6 November 2022	Paris Masters	Paris (FRA)	Masters 1000	Hard (i)	2R	90	0	Withdrew
Total year-end points						300	0	▼300 difference

== Yearly records ==
=== Head-to-head matchups ===
Novak Djokovic has a 42–7 ATP match win–loss record in the 2022 season. His record against players who were part of the ATP rankings Top Ten at the time of their meetings is 11–3. Bold indicates player was ranked top 10 at the time of at least one meeting. The following list is ordered by number of wins:

- (Russia) Karen Khachanov 4–0
- (Greece) **Stefanos Tsitsipas** 4–0
- (Serbia) Miomir Kecmanović 2–0
- **Daniil Medvedev** 2–0
- (Italy) Lorenzo Musetti 2–0
- (Norway) **Casper Ruud** 2–0
- (Spain) Pablo Andújar 1–0
- (Slovenia) Aljaž Bedene 1–0
- (Croatia) Marin Čilić 1–0
- (United States) Maxime Cressy 1–0
- (Serbia) Laslo Đere 1–0
- (United States) **Taylor Fritz** 1–0
- (Chile) Cristian Garín 1–0
- (Poland) Hubert Hurkacz 1–0
- (Russia) Aslan Karatsev 1–0
- (Australia) Thanasi Kokkinakis 1–0
- (Australia) Nick Kyrgios 1–0
- (Slovakia) Alex Molčan 1–0
- (France) Gaël Monfils 1–0
- (Japan) Yoshihito Nishioka 1–0
- (United Kingdom) Cameron Norrie 1–0
- (Canada) Vasek Pospisil 1–0
- Roman Safiullin 1–0
- (Argentina) Diego Schwartzman 1–0
- (Italy) Jannik Sinner 1–0
- (South Korea) Kwon Soon-woo 1–0
- (United States) Frances Tiafoe 1–0
- (Netherlands) Botic van de Zandschulp 1–0
- (Netherlands) Tim van Rijthoven 1–0
- (Switzerland) Stan Wawrinka 1–0
- (Canada) **Félix Auger-Aliassime** 1–1
- (Russia) **Andrey Rublev** 1–1
- (Spain) **Carlos Alcaraz** 0–1
- (Spain) Alejandro Davidovich Fokina 0–1
- (Spain) **Rafael Nadal** 0–1
- (Denmark) Holger Rune 0–1
- (Czech Republic) Jiří Veselý 0–1

* Statistics correct as of 20 November 2022.

=== Finals ===
==== Singles: 7 (5 titles, 2 runner-ups) ====
Category Grand Slam (1–0) ATP Finals (1–0) Masters 1000 (1–1) 500 Series (1–0) 250 Series (1–1)	Titles by surface Hard (3–1) Clay (1–1) Grass (1–0)	Titles by setting Outdoor (2–1) Indoor (3–1)

Result	W–L	Date	Tournament	Tier	Surface	Opponent	Score
Loss	0–1	Apr 2022	Serbia Open, Serbia	250 Series	Clay	Andrey Rublev	2–6, 7–6^{(7–4)}, 0–6
Win	1–1	May 2022	Italian Open, Italy (6)	Masters 1000	Clay	(Greece) Stefanos Tsitsipas	6–0, 7–6^{(7–5)}
Win	2–1	Jul 2022	Wimbledon, United Kingdom (7)	Grand Slam	Grass	(Australia) Nick Kyrgios	4–6, 6–3, 6–4, 7–6^{(7–3)}
Win	3–1	Oct 2022	Tel Aviv Open, Israel	250 Series	Hard (i)	(Croatia) Marin Čilić	6–3, 6–4
Win	4–1	Oct 2022	Astana Open, Kazakhstan	500 Series	Hard (i)	(Greece) Stefanos Tsitsipas	6–3, 6–4
Loss	4–2	Nov 2022	Paris Masters, France	Masters 1000	Hard (i)	(Denmark) Holger Rune	6–3, 3–6, 5–7
Win	5–2	Nov 2022	ATP Finals, Italy (6)	Tour Finals	Hard (i)	(Norway) Casper Ruud	7–5, 6–3

=== Top 10 wins ===
Category Grand Slam (0) ATP Finals (5) Masters 1000 (4) 500 Series (2) 250 Series (0)	Wins by surface Hard (8) Clay (3) Grass (0)	Wins by setting Outdoor (3) Indoor (8)

#	Player	Rank	Event	Surface	Rd	Score	NDR
1/230	(Canada) Félix Auger-Aliassime	9	Italian Open, Italy	Clay	QF	7–5, 7–6^{(7–1)}	**1**
2/231	(Norway) Casper Ruud	10	Italian Open, Italy	Clay	SF	6–4, 6–3	**1**
3/232	(Greece) Stefanos Tsitsipas	5	Italian Open, Italy	Clay	F	6–0, 7–6^{(7–5)}	**1**
4/233	Daniil Medvedev	4	Astana Open, Kazakhstan	Hard (i)	SF	4–6, 7–6^{(8–6)}, ret.	7
5/234	(Greece) Stefanos Tsitsipas	6	Astana Open, Kazakhstan	Hard (i)	F	6–3, 6–4	7
6/235	(Greece) Stefanos Tsitsipas	5	Paris Masters, France	Hard (i)	SF	6–2, 3–6, 7–6^{(7–4)}	7
7/236	(Greece) Stefanos Tsitsipas	3	ATP Finals, Turin, Italy	Hard (i)	RR	6–4, 7–6^{(7–4)}	8
8/237	Andrey Rublev	7	ATP Finals, Turin, Italy	Hard (i)	RR	6–4, 6–1	8
9/238	Daniil Medvedev	5	ATP Finals, Turin, Italy	Hard (i)	RR	6–3, 6–7^{(5–7)}, 7–6^{(7–2)}	8
10/239	(United States) Taylor Fritz	9	ATP Finals, Turin, Italy	Hard (i)	SF	7–6^{(7–5)}, 7–6^{(8–6)}	8
11/240	(Norway) Casper Ruud	4	ATP Finals, Turin, Italy	Hard (i)	F	7–5, 6–3	8

=== Earnings ===
- **Bold** font denotes tournament win

**Singles**
Event	Prize money	Year-to-date
Dubai Tennis Championships	$76,570	$76,570
Monte-Carlo Masters	€39,070	$119,066
Serbia Open	€47,430	$170,338
Madrid Open	€311,025	$498,189
**Italian Open**	**€836,355**	$1,379,875
French Open	€380,000	$1,784,727
**Wimbledon Championships**	**£2,000,000**	$4,239,527
**Tel Aviv Open**	**$144,415**	$4,383,942
**Astana Open**	**$355,310**	$4,739,252
Paris Masters	€456,720	$5,194,282
**ATP Finals**	**$4,740,300**	$9,934,582
		$9,934,582
**Doubles**
Event	Prize money	Year-to-date
		$0
**Total**
		**$9,934,582**

Figures in United States dollars (USD) unless noted.

- source：2022 Singles Activity
- source：2022 Doubles Activity

== See also ==
- 2022 ATP Tour
- 2022 Rafael Nadal tennis season
- 2022 Daniil Medvedev tennis season
- 2022 Carlos Alcaraz tennis season
