= 2022 Rafael Nadal tennis season =

Statistics for Spanish tennis player

- Full name: Rafael Nadal Parera
- Country: Spain
- Calendar prize money: $9,368,326

Singles
- Season record: 39–8
- Calendar titles: 4
- Year-end ranking: No. 2
- Ranking change from previous year: ▲4

Grand Slam & significant results
- Australian Open: W
- French Open: W
- Wimbledon: SF (withdrew)
- US Open: 4R

Doubles
- Season record: 1–1
- Current ranking: No. 1159
- Ranking change from previous year: ▼648

Grand Slam mixed doubles results
- Injuries: Stress fracture to rib Abdominal tear

The 2022 Rafael Nadal tennis season officially began on 3 January 2022, with the start of the ATP 250 tournament in Melbourne. It includes Nadal's best start to an ATP Tour season, when he won his first 20 matches (and three titles, including the Australian Open) in a row. It was also his career-first season winning the first two majors of the year, hence completing the Australian-French title double. As such, Nadal broke his tie with Roger Federer and Novak Djokovic, and became the first man in history to win a total 21 (after winning the 2022 Australian Open), and 22 (after winning the 2022 French Open) Grand Slam singles titles.

== Yearly summary ==
=== Early hard court season ===
==== Melbourne Summer Set 1 ====
Rafael Nadal won his 89th ATP singles title at Melbourne Summer Set 1 without dropping a set en route, defeating qualifier Maxime Cressy in the final.

==== Australian Open ====
Nadal won his second Australian Open title and 21st men's singles major title overall, surpassing an all-time record he jointly held with Novak Djokovic and Roger Federer. Nadal defeated Denis Shapovalov and Matteo Berrettini en route to the final, where he outlasted Daniil Medvedev in five hours and 24 minutes. Nadal was down two sets, and serving at 2-3 0-40 in the third, eventually winning 2-6 6-7(5-7) 6-4 6-4 7-5. It was Nadal's 90th ATP title, and he became the second man in the Open Era, after Djokovic, to achieve the double career Grand Slam.

==== Mexican Open ====
Nadal stormed to the title in high form, not dropping a set in any of his five matches (including a win over Medvedev, who earlier that week had clinched the world No. 1 ranking). He beat Cameron Norrie in the final to win his third title of the year and extend his unbeaten streak for the season to 15-0, his career-best start to an ATP Tour season.

==== Indian Wells Masters ====
Nadal reached the final for a fifth time after beating Sebastian Korda, Daniel Evans, Reilly Opelka, Nick Kyrgios and compatriot Carlos Alcaraz. He then lost in the final to Taylor Fritz, ending his 20 match winning streak, which marks his career-best start to a season.

=== Clay court season ===
Nadal missed the Monte Carlo Masters and the Barcelona Open citing a rib injury sustained in the Indian Wells final. It was the first time since 2004 that he was forced to miss Monte Carlo and Barcelona where he has won 11 and 12 titles respectively.

==== Madrid Open ====
Nadal returned to play in Madrid. In his first match he beat Miomir Kecmanović, then saved 4 match points to beat David Goffin to reach the quarterfinals, where he was defeated by eventual champion Carlos Alcaraz in three sets.

==== Italian Open ====
Nadal returned to Rome as the defending champion, and defeated John Isner in straight sets in the second round. Nadal faced physical pain during his third round encounter with Denis Shapovalov due to his prevailing chronic foot injury, and lost in three sets.

==== French Open ====
Nadal won his 14th French Open title and a record-extending 22nd men's singles major title overall. He defeated four Top-10 players en route to the title; Félix Auger-Aliassime (fourth round), Novak Djokovic (quarterfinals), Alexander Zverev (semifinals), and Casper Ruud (final). Nadal completed the Australian–French double for the first time in his career, and became one of five men to do so in the Open Era. Nadal also became the oldest singles champion (36 years 2 days) in the history of the French Open.

=== Grass court season ===
==== Wimbledon ====
After treating his foot injury, Nadal returned to Wimbledon for the first time in three years. However, he tore an abdominal muscle during the tournament, which was aggravated after his quarterfinal match against Taylor Fritz. Despite winning the encounter, Nadal withdrew from the tournament the following day.

=== North American hard court season ===
==== Cincinnati Masters ====
Nadal returned to the Cincinnati Masters in his first match since facing an abdominal muscle tear at Wimbledon, however lost to the eventual-champion Borna Ćorić in the opening round.

==== US Open ====
Nadal returned to the US Open after not playing for 3 years and had his first hard court match since Cincinnati. He beat Rinky Hijikata in the first round, Fabio Fognini in the second round and Richard Gasquet in the third round. In the fourth round Nadal lost to Frances Tiafoe, ending his bid of a 3rd major in 2022.

==== Laver Cup ====
Nadal participated at the Laver Cup in London. He played just one doubles match, alongside longtime friend and rival Roger Federer in what was Federer's final professional tennis match. The pair lost to Jack Sock and Frances Tiafoe 11-9 in the final set tiebreak, despite holding a match point on Federer's serve. Team World went on to claim their first Laver Cup title.

=== Indoor Swing ===
==== Paris Masters ====
Nadal returned to the Paris Masters after not playing for 2 years, however lost to Tommy Paul in the opening round.

==== ATP Finals ====
On October 24, Nadal confirmed his participation at the ATP Finals in Turin. He lost his opening matches to Taylor Fritz and Félix Auger-Aliassime in straight sets. He went on beat Casper Ruud, but he failed to advance to the semifinals.

== All matches ==
This table chronicles all the matches of Rafael Nadal in 2022.

Key
W	F	SF	QF	#R	RR	Q#	P#	DNQ	A	Z#	PO	G	S	B	NMS	NTI	P	NH

(W) winner; (F) finalist; (SF) semifinalist; (QF) quarterfinalist; (#R) rounds 4, 3, 2, 1; (RR) round-robin stage; (Q#) qualification round; (P#) preliminary round; (DNQ) did not qualify; (A) absent; (Z#) Davis/Fed Cup Zonal Group (with number indication) or (PO) play-off; (G) gold, (S) silver or (B) bronze Olympic/Paralympic medal; (NMS) not a Masters tournament; (NTI) not a Tier I tournament; (P) postponed; (NH) not held; (SR) strike rate (events won / competed); (W–L) win–loss record.
To avoid confusion and double counting, these charts are updated at the conclusion of a tournament or when the player's participation has ended.

=== Singles matches ===
Tournament	Match	Round	Opponent (seed or key)	Rank	Result	Score
Melbourne Summer Set; Melbourne, Australia; ATP 250; Hard, outdoor 3 – 9 January 2022
Melbourne Summer Set; Melbourne, Australia; ATP 250; Hard, outdoor 3 – 9 January 2022	–	1R	Bye			
Melbourne Summer Set; Melbourne, Australia; ATP 250; Hard, outdoor 3 – 9 January 2022	1 / 1238	2R	(Lithuania) Ričardas Berankis (Q)	104	Win	6–2, 7–5
Melbourne Summer Set; Melbourne, Australia; ATP 250; Hard, outdoor 3 – 9 January 2022	–	QF	(Netherlands) Tallon Griekspoor	64	W/O	N/A
Melbourne Summer Set; Melbourne, Australia; ATP 250; Hard, outdoor 3 – 9 January 2022	2 / 1239	SF	(Finland) Emil Ruusuvuori (Alt.)	95	Win	6–4, 7–5
Melbourne Summer Set; Melbourne, Australia; ATP 250; Hard, outdoor 3 – 9 January 2022	3 / 1240	W	(United States) Maxime Cressy (Q)	112	Win (1)	7–6^{(8–6)}, 6–3
Australian Open; Melbourne, Australia; Grand Slam tournament Hard, outdoor 17 – 30 January 2022
Australian Open; Melbourne, Australia; Grand Slam tournament Hard, outdoor 17 – 30 January 2022	4 / 1241	1R	(United States) Marcos Giron	66	Win	6–1, 6–4, 6–2
Australian Open; Melbourne, Australia; Grand Slam tournament Hard, outdoor 17 – 30 January 2022	5 / 1242	2R	(Germany) Yannick Hanfmann (Q)	126	Win	6–2, 6–3, 6–4
Australian Open; Melbourne, Australia; Grand Slam tournament Hard, outdoor 17 – 30 January 2022	6 / 1243	3R	(Russia) Karen Khachanov (28)	30	Win	6–3, 6–2, 3–6, 6–1
Australian Open; Melbourne, Australia; Grand Slam tournament Hard, outdoor 17 – 30 January 2022	7 / 1244	4R	(France) Adrian Mannarino	69	Win	7–6^{(16–14)}, 6–2, 6–2
Australian Open; Melbourne, Australia; Grand Slam tournament Hard, outdoor 17 – 30 January 2022	8 / 1245	QF	(Canada) Denis Shapovalov (14)	14	Win	6–3, 6–4, 4–6, 3–6, 6–3
Australian Open; Melbourne, Australia; Grand Slam tournament Hard, outdoor 17 – 30 January 2022	9 / 1246	SF	(Italy) Matteo Berrettini (7)	7	Win	6–3, 6–2, 3–6, 6–3
Australian Open; Melbourne, Australia; Grand Slam tournament Hard, outdoor 17 – 30 January 2022	10 / 1247	W	(Russia) Daniil Medvedev (2)	2	Win (2)	2–6, 6–7^{(5–7)}, 6–4, 6–4, 7–5
Mexican Open; Acapulco, Mexico; ATP 500; Hard, outdoor 21 – 26 February 2022
Mexican Open; Acapulco, Mexico; ATP 500; Hard, outdoor 21 – 26 February 2022	11 / 1248	1R	(United States) Denis Kudla (LL)	100	Win	6–3, 6–2
Mexican Open; Acapulco, Mexico; ATP 500; Hard, outdoor 21 – 26 February 2022	12 / 1249	2R	(United States) Stefan Kozlov (LL)	130	Win	6–0, 6–3
Mexican Open; Acapulco, Mexico; ATP 500; Hard, outdoor 21 – 26 February 2022	13 / 1250	QF	(United States) Tommy Paul	39	Win	6–0, 7–6^{(7–5)}
Mexican Open; Acapulco, Mexico; ATP 500; Hard, outdoor 21 – 26 February 2022	14 / 1251	SF	(Russia) Daniil Medvedev (1)	2	Win	6–3, 6–3
Mexican Open; Acapulco, Mexico; ATP 500; Hard, outdoor 21 – 26 February 2022	15 / 1252	W	(United Kingdom) Cameron Norrie (6)	12	Win (3)	6–4, 6–4
Indian Wells Masters; Indian Wells, United States; ATP 1000; Hard, outdoor 10 – 20 March 2022
Indian Wells Masters; Indian Wells, United States; ATP 1000; Hard, outdoor 10 – 20 March 2022	–	1R	Bye			
Indian Wells Masters; Indian Wells, United States; ATP 1000; Hard, outdoor 10 – 20 March 2022	16 / 1253	2R	(United States) Sebastian Korda	38	Win	6–2, 1–6, 7–6^{(7–3)}
Indian Wells Masters; Indian Wells, United States; ATP 1000; Hard, outdoor 10 – 20 March 2022	17 / 1254	3R	(United Kingdom) Dan Evans (27)	28	Win	7–5, 6–3
Indian Wells Masters; Indian Wells, United States; ATP 1000; Hard, outdoor 10 – 20 March 2022	18 / 1255	4R	(United States) Reilly Opelka (17)	17	Win	7–6^{(7–3)}, 7–6^{(7–5)}
Indian Wells Masters; Indian Wells, United States; ATP 1000; Hard, outdoor 10 – 20 March 2022	19 / 1256	QF	(Australia) Nick Kyrgios (WC)	132	Win	7–6^{(7–0)}, 5–7, 6–4
Indian Wells Masters; Indian Wells, United States; ATP 1000; Hard, outdoor 10 – 20 March 2022	20 / 1257	SF	(Spain) Carlos Alcaraz (19)	19	Win	6–4, 4–6, 6–3
Indian Wells Masters; Indian Wells, United States; ATP 1000; Hard, outdoor 10 – 20 March 2022	21 / 1258	F	(United States) Taylor Fritz (20)	20	Loss	3–6, 6–7^{(5–7)}
Madrid Open; Madrid, Spain; ATP 1000; Clay, outdoor 2 – 8 May 2022
Madrid Open; Madrid, Spain; ATP 1000; Clay, outdoor 2 – 8 May 2022	–	1R	Bye			
Madrid Open; Madrid, Spain; ATP 1000; Clay, outdoor 2 – 8 May 2022	22 / 1259	2R	(Serbia) Miomir Kecmanović	32	Win	6–1, 7–6^{(7–4)}
Madrid Open; Madrid, Spain; ATP 1000; Clay, outdoor 2 – 8 May 2022	23 / 1260	3R	(Belgium) David Goffin (Q)	60	Win	6–3, 5–7, 7–6^{(11–9)}
Madrid Open; Madrid, Spain; ATP 1000; Clay, outdoor 2 – 8 May 2022	24 / 1261	QF	(Spain) Carlos Alcaraz (7)	9	Loss	2–6, 6–1, 3–6
Italian Open; Rome, Italy; ATP 1000; Clay, outdoor 8 – 15 May 2022
Italian Open; Rome, Italy; ATP 1000; Clay, outdoor 8 – 15 May 2022	–	1R	Bye			
Italian Open; Rome, Italy; ATP 1000; Clay, outdoor 8 – 15 May 2022	25 / 1262	2R	(United States) John Isner	27	Win	6–3, 6–1
Italian Open; Rome, Italy; ATP 1000; Clay, outdoor 8 – 15 May 2022	26 / 1263	3R	(Canada) Denis Shapovalov (13)	16	Loss	6–1, 5–7, 2–6
French Open; Paris, France; Grand Slam tournament Clay, outdoor 22 May – 5 June 2022
French Open; Paris, France; Grand Slam tournament Clay, outdoor 22 May – 5 June 2022	27 / 1264	1R	(Australia) Jordan Thompson	82	Win	6–2, 6–2, 6–2
French Open; Paris, France; Grand Slam tournament Clay, outdoor 22 May – 5 June 2022	28 / 1265	2R	(France) Corentin Moutet (WC)	139	Win	6–3, 6–1, 6–4
French Open; Paris, France; Grand Slam tournament Clay, outdoor 22 May – 5 June 2022	29 / 1266	3R	(Netherlands) Botic van de Zandschulp (26)	29	Win	6–3, 6–2, 6–4
French Open; Paris, France; Grand Slam tournament Clay, outdoor 22 May – 5 June 2022	30 / 1267	4R	(Canada) Félix Auger-Aliassime (9)	9	Win	3–6, 6–3, 6–2, 3–6, 6–3
French Open; Paris, France; Grand Slam tournament Clay, outdoor 22 May – 5 June 2022	31 / 1268	QF	(Serbia) Novak Djokovic (1)	1	Win	6–2, 4–6, 6–2, 7–6^{(7–4)}
French Open; Paris, France; Grand Slam tournament Clay, outdoor 22 May – 5 June 2022	32 / 1269	SF	(Germany) Alexander Zverev (3)	3	Win	7–6^{(10–8)}, 6–6^{(0–0)}, ret.
French Open; Paris, France; Grand Slam tournament Clay, outdoor 22 May – 5 June 2022	33 / 1270	W	(Norway) Casper Ruud (8)	8	Win (4)	6–3, 6–3, 6–0
Wimbledon Championships; London, United Kingdom; Grand Slam tournament Grass, outdoor 27 June – 10 July 2022
Wimbledon Championships; London, United Kingdom; Grand Slam tournament Grass, outdoor 27 June – 10 July 2022	34 / 1271	1R	(Argentina) Francisco Cerúndolo	41	Win	6–4, 6–3, 3–6, 6–4
Wimbledon Championships; London, United Kingdom; Grand Slam tournament Grass, outdoor 27 June – 10 July 2022	35 / 1272	2R	(Lithuania) Ričardas Berankis	106	Win	6–4, 6–4, 4–6, 6–3
Wimbledon Championships; London, United Kingdom; Grand Slam tournament Grass, outdoor 27 June – 10 July 2022	36 / 1273	3R	(Italy) Lorenzo Sonego (27)	54	Win	6–1, 6–2, 6–4
Wimbledon Championships; London, United Kingdom; Grand Slam tournament Grass, outdoor 27 June – 10 July 2022	37 / 1274	4R	(Netherlands) Botic van de Zandschulp (21)	25	Win	6–4, 6–2, 7–6^{(8–6)}
Wimbledon Championships; London, United Kingdom; Grand Slam tournament Grass, outdoor 27 June – 10 July 2022	38 / 1275	QF	(United States) Taylor Fritz (11)	14	Win	3–6, 7–5, 3–6, 7–5, 7–6^{(10–4)}
Wimbledon Championships; London, United Kingdom; Grand Slam tournament Grass, outdoor 27 June – 10 July 2022	–	SF	(Australia) Nick Kyrgios	40	walkover	N/A
Cincinnati Masters; Cincinnati, United States; ATP 1000; Hard, outdoor 14 – 21 August 2022
Cincinnati Masters; Cincinnati, United States; ATP 1000; Hard, outdoor 14 – 21 August 2022	–	1R	Bye			
Cincinnati Masters; Cincinnati, United States; ATP 1000; Hard, outdoor 14 – 21 August 2022	39 / 1276	2R	(Croatia) Borna Ćorić (PR)	152	Loss	6–7^{(9–11)}, 6–4, 3–6
US Open; New York City, United States; Grand Slam tournament Hard, outdoor 29 August – 11 September 2022
US Open; New York City, United States; Grand Slam tournament Hard, outdoor 29 August – 11 September 2022	40 / 1277	1R	(Australia) Rinky Hijikata (WC)	198	Win	4–6, 6–2, 6–3, 6–3
US Open; New York City, United States; Grand Slam tournament Hard, outdoor 29 August – 11 September 2022	41 / 1278	2R	(Italy) Fabio Fognini	60	Win	2–6, 6–4, 6–2, 6–1
US Open; New York City, United States; Grand Slam tournament Hard, outdoor 29 August – 11 September 2022	42 / 1279	3R	(France) Richard Gasquet	91	Win	6–0, 6–1, 7–5
US Open; New York City, United States; Grand Slam tournament Hard, outdoor 29 August – 11 September 2022	43 / 1280	4R	(United States) Frances Tiafoe (22)	26	Loss	4–6, 6–4, 4–6, 3–6
Paris Masters; Paris, France; ATP 1000; Hard, indoor 31 October – 6 November 2022
Paris Masters; Paris, France; ATP 1000; Hard, indoor 31 October – 6 November 2022	–	1R	Bye			
Paris Masters; Paris, France; ATP 1000; Hard, indoor 31 October – 6 November 2022	44 / 1281	2R	(United States) Tommy Paul	31	Loss	6–3, 6–7^{(4–7)}, 1–6
ATP Finals; Turin, Italy; ATP Finals; Hard, indoor 13 – 20 November 2022
ATP Finals; Turin, Italy; ATP Finals; Hard, indoor 13 – 20 November 2022	45 / 1282	RR	(United States) Taylor Fritz (8)	9	Loss	6–7^{(3–7)}, 1–6
ATP Finals; Turin, Italy; ATP Finals; Hard, indoor 13 – 20 November 2022	46 / 1283	RR	(Canada) Félix Auger-Aliassime (5)	6	Loss	3–6, 4–6
ATP Finals; Turin, Italy; ATP Finals; Hard, indoor 13 – 20 November 2022	47 / 1284	RR	(Norway) Casper Ruud (3)	4	Win	7–5, 7–5

=== Doubles matches ===
Tournament	Match	Round	Opponents (seed or key)	Ranks	Result	Score
Melbourne Summer Set; Melbourne, Australia; ATP 250; Hard, outdoor 3 – 9 January 2022; Partner: (Spain) Jaume Munar
Melbourne Summer Set; Melbourne, Australia; ATP 250; Hard, outdoor 3 – 9 January 2022; Partner: (Spain) Jaume Munar	1 / 212	1R	(Argentina) Sebastián Báez / (Argentina) Tomás Martín Etcheverry (Alt.)	886 / 281	Win	6–3, 3–6, [10–4]
Melbourne Summer Set; Melbourne, Australia; ATP 250; Hard, outdoor 3 – 9 January 2022; Partner: (Spain) Jaume Munar	–	2R	(Kazakhstan) Andrey Golubev / (Croatia) Franko Škugor (4)	28 / 53	Withdrew	N/A
Laver Cup; London, United Kingdom; Laver Cup; Hard, indoor 23 – 25 September 2022; Partner: (Switzerland) Roger Federer
Laver Cup; London, United Kingdom; Laver Cup; Hard, indoor 23 – 25 September 2022; Partner: (Switzerland) Roger Federer	2 / 213	Day 1	(United States) Jack Sock / (United States) Frances Tiafoe	43 / 220	Loss	6–4, 6–7^{2–7}, [9–11]

== Exhibition matches ==
=== Singles ===
Tournament	Match	Round	Opponent (seed or key)	Rank	Result	Score
Mubadala World Tennis Championship; Abu Dhabi, United Arab Emirates Hard, outdoor 16 – 18 December 2021
Mubadala World Tennis Championship; Abu Dhabi, United Arab Emirates Hard, outdoor 16 – 18 December 2021	–	QF	Bye			
Mubadala World Tennis Championship; Abu Dhabi, United Arab Emirates Hard, outdoor 16 – 18 December 2021	1	SF	(United Kingdom) Andy Murray	134	Loss	3–6, 5–7
Mubadala World Tennis Championship; Abu Dhabi, United Arab Emirates Hard, outdoor 16 – 18 December 2021	2	PO	(Canada) Denis Shapovalov	14	Loss	7–6^{(7–4)}, 3–6, [6–10]
Hurlingham Tennis Classic; London, United Kingdom Grass, outdoor 22 – 24 June 2022
Hurlingham Tennis Classic; London, United Kingdom Grass, outdoor 22 – 24 June 2022	3	PO	(Switzerland) Stan Wawrinka	267	Win	6–2, 6–3
Hurlingham Tennis Classic; London, United Kingdom Grass, outdoor 22 – 24 June 2022	4	PO	(Canada) Félix Auger-Aliassime	9	Loss	6–7^{(6–8)}, 6–4, [3–10]

== Schedule ==
Per Rafael Nadal, this is his current 2022 schedule (subject to change).

=== Singles schedule ===
Date	Tournament	Location	Tier	Surface	Prev. result	Prev. points	New points	Result
4 January 2022– 9 January 2022	Melbourne Summer Set	Melbourne (AUS)	250 Series	Hard	N/A	N/A	250	Champion (defeated (United States) Maxime Cressy, 7–6^{(8–6)}, 6–3)
17 January 2022– 30 January 2022	Australian Open	Melbourne (AUS)	Grand Slam	Hard	QF	360	2000	Champion (defeated (Russia) Daniil Medvedev, 2–6, 6–7^{(5–7)}, 6–4, 6–4, 7–5)
21 February 2022– 26 February 2022	Mexican Open	Acapulco (MEX)	500 Series	Hard	W	0 (500 (Note: Points carried over due to the Best of 24-month ranking being extended through and including the week of 1 March 2021.))	500	Champion (defeated (United Kingdom) Cameron Norrie, 6–4, 6–4)
10 March 2022– 20 March 2022	Indian Wells Masters	Indian Wells (USA)	Masters 1000	Hard	A	0	600	Final (lost to (United States) Taylor Fritz, 3–6, 6–7^{(5–7)})
10 April 2022– 17 April 2022	Monte-Carlo Masters	Roquebrune-Cap-Martin (FRA)	Masters 1000	Clay	QF	180 (180 (Note: Points carried over due to the Best of 24-month ranking being used for events between 4 March – 5 August 2019, that were not played in 2020, but weighted at 50%.))	0	Withdrew
18 April 2022– 24 April 2022	Barcelona Open	Barcelona (ESP)	500 Series	Clay	W	500	0	Withdrew
2 May 2022– 8 May 2022	Madrid Open	Madrid (ESP)	Masters 1000	Clay	QF	180 (180)	180	Quarterfinals (lost to (Spain) Carlos Alcaraz, 2–6, 6–1, 3–6)
8 May 2022– 15 May 2022	Italian Open	Rome (ITA)	Masters 1000	Clay	W	1000	90	Third round (lost to (Canada) Denis Shapovalov, 6–1, 5–7, 2–6)
22 May 2022– 5 June 2022	French Open	Paris (FRA)	Grand Slam	Clay	SF	720 (1000)	2000	Champion (defeated (Norway) Casper Ruud, 6–3, 6–3, 6–0)
27 June 2022– 10 July 2022	Wimbledon	London (GBR)	Grand Slam	Grass	A	0 (360)	0 (Note: Removal Of ATP Rankings Points From 2022 Wimbledon.)	Semifinals (withdrew due to an abdominal tear)
14 August 2022– 21 August 2022	Cincinnati Masters	Cincinnati (USA)	Masters 1000	Hard	A	0	10	Second round (lost to (Croatia) Borna Ćorić, 6–7^{(9–11)}, 6–4, 3–6)
29 August 2022– 11 September 2022	US Open	New York (USA)	Grand Slam	Hard	A	0	180	Fourth round (lost to (United States) Frances Tiafoe, 4–6, 6–4, 4–6, 3–6)
31 October 2022– 6 November 2022	Paris Masters	Paris (FRA)	Masters 1000	Hard (i)	N/A	0	10	Second round (lost to (United States) Tommy Paul, 6–3, 6–7^{(4–7)}, 1–6)
13 November 2022– 20 November 2022	ATP Finals	Turin (ITA)	Tour Finals	Hard (i)	N/A	N/A	200	Round robin (1 win – 2 losses)
Total year-end points						4875	6020	▲1145 difference

== Yearly records ==
=== Head-to-head matchups ===
Rafael Nadal has a 39–8 ATP match win–loss record in the 2022 season. His record against players who were part of the ATP rankings Top Ten at the time of their meetings is 8–3. Bold indicates player was ranked top 10 at the time of at least one meeting. The following list is ordered by number of wins:

- (Lithuania) Ričardas Berankis 2–0
- **(Russia) Daniil Medvedev** 2–0
- (Norway) **Casper Ruud** 2–0
- (Netherlands) Botic van de Zandschulp 2–0
- **(Italy) Matteo Berrettini** 1–0
- (Argentina) Francisco Cerúndolo 1–0
- (United States) Maxime Cressy 1–0
- **(Serbia) Novak Djokovic** 1–0
- (United Kingdom) Dan Evans 1–0
- (France) Richard Gasquet 1–0
- (United States) Marcos Giron 1–0
- (Belgium) David Goffin 1–0
- (Italy) Fabio Fognini 1–0
- (Germany) Yannick Hanfmann 1–0
- (Australia) Rinky Hijikata 1–0
- (United States) John Isner 1–0
- (Serbia) Miomir Kecmanović 1–0
- (Russia) Karen Khachanov 1–0
- (United States) Sebastian Korda 1–0
- (United States) Stefan Kozlov 1–0
- (United States) Denis Kudla 1–0
- (Australia) Nick Kyrgios 1–0
- (France) Adrian Mannarino 1–0
- (France) Corentin Moutet 1–0
- (United Kingdom) Cameron Norrie 1–0
- (United States) Reilly Opelka 1–0
- (Finland) Emil Ruusuvuori 1–0
- (Italy) Lorenzo Sonego 1–0
- (Australia) Jordan Thompson 1–0
- **(Germany) Alexander Zverev** 1–0
- **(Spain) Carlos Alcaraz** 1–1
- **(Canada) Félix Auger-Aliassime** 1–1
- (United States) Tommy Paul 1–1
- (Canada) Denis Shapovalov 1–1
- **(United States) Taylor Fritz** 1–2
- (Croatia) Borna Ćorić 0–1
- (United States) Frances Tiafoe 0–1

* Statistics correct as of 17 November 2022.

=== Top 10 wins ===
Category Grand Slam (6) ATP Finals (1) Masters 1000 (0) 500 Series (1) 250 Series (0)	Wins by surface Hard (4) Clay (4) Grass (0)	Wins by setting Outdoor (7) Indoor (1)

#	Player	Rank	Event	Surface	Rd	Score	RNR
1/179	(Italy) Matteo Berrettini	7	Australian Open, Melbourne, Australia	Hard	SF	6–3, 6–2, 3–6, 6–3	5
2/180	(Russia) Daniil Medvedev	2	Australian Open, Melbourne, Australia	Hard	F	2–6, 6–7^{(5–7)}, 6–4, 6–4, 7–5	5
3/181	(Russia) Daniil Medvedev	2	Acapulco, Mexico	Hard	SF	6–3, 6–3	5
4/182	(Canada) Félix Auger-Aliassime	9	French Open, Paris, France	Clay	4R	3–6, 6–3, 6–2, 3–6, 6–3	5
5/183	(Serbia) Novak Djokovic	1	French Open, Paris, France	Clay	QF	6–2, 4–6, 6–2, 7–6^{(7–4)}	5
6/184	(Germany) Alexander Zverev	3	French Open, Paris, France	Clay	SF	7–6^{(10–8)}, 6–6, ret.	5
7/185	(Norway) Casper Ruud	7	French Open, Paris, France	Clay	F	6–3, 6–3, 6–0	5
8/186	(Norway) Casper Ruud	4	ATP Finals, Turin, Italy	Hard (i)	RR	7–5, 7–5	2

=== Finals ===
==== Singles: 5 (4 titles, 1 runner-up) ====
Category Grand Slam (2–0) ATP Finals (0–0) Masters 1000 (0–1) 500 Series (1–0) 250 Series (1–0)	Titles by surface Hard (3–1) Clay (1–0) Grass (0–0)	Titles by setting Outdoor (4–1) Indoor (0–0)

Result	W–L	Date	Tournament	Tier	Surface	Opponent	Score
Win	1–0	Jan 2022	Melbourne Summer Set, Australia*	250 Series	Hard	(United States) Maxime Cressy	7–6^{(8–6)}, 6–3
Win	2–0	Jan 2022	Australian Open, Australia (2)	Grand Slam	Hard	(Russia) Daniil Medvedev	2–6, 6–7^{(5–7)}, 6–4, 6–4, 7–5
Win	3–0	Feb 2022	Mexican Open, Mexico* (4)	500 Series	Hard	(United Kingdom) Cameron Norrie	6–4, 6–4
Loss	3–1	Mar 2022	Indian Wells Masters, US	Masters 1000	Hard	(United States) Taylor Fritz	3–6, 6–7^{(5–7)}
Win	4–1	Jun 2022	French Open, France (14)	Grand Slam	Clay	(Norway) Casper Ruud	6–3, 6–3, 6–0

(*) signifies tournaments where Nadal won the title without dropping a set.

=== Earnings ===
- **Bold** font denotes tournament win

**Singles**
Event	Prize money	Year-to-date
**Melbourne Summer Set**	**$87,370**	$87,370
**Australian Open**	**$2,875,000**	$2,158,520
**Mexican Open**	**$314,455**	$2,472,975
Indian Wells Masters	$646,110	$3,119,085
Madrid Open	€169,650	$3,297,913
Italian Open	€72,865	$3,374,727
**French Open**	**€2,200,000**	$5,718,608
Wimbledon Championships	£535,000	$6,375,266
Cincinnati Masters	$45,315	$6,420,581
US Open	$278,000	$6,698,581
Paris Masters	€39,070	$6,737,506
ATP Finals	$703,300	$7,440,806
Bonus pool	$1,926,250	$9,367,056
		$9,367,056
**Doubles**
Event	Prize money	Year-to-date
Melbourne Summer Set	$1,270	$1,270
		$1,270
**Total**
		**$9,368,326**

Figures in United States dollars (USD) unless noted.

- source：2022 Singles Activity
- source：2022 Doubles Activity

== Historic achievements ==
Tournament	Since	Record accomplished	Players matched	Date achieved
Grand Slam	1877	22 men's Grand Slam singles titles	Stands alone	6 June
Grand Slam	1905	Double Career Grand Slam	Roy Emerson; Rod Laver; Novak Djokovic	30 January
Australian Open	1968	Longest gap between subsequent titles, 13 years (2009-2022)	Stands alone	30 January
Australian Open	1968	Won final from two sets down	Stands alone	30 January
French Open	1891	14 men's singles titles	Stands alone	6 June
French Open	1891	14 finals	Stands alone	4 June
French Open	1891	15 semifinals	Stands alone	1 June
French Open	1891	6 consecutive semifinals	Novak Djokovic	1 June
French Open	1891	16 quarterfinals	Novak Djokovic	1 June
French Open	1891	Most match wins at a single major (112 at the French Open)	Stands alone	1 June
French Open	1891	Oldest singles champion (36 years 2 days)	Stands alone	6 June
Mexican Open	1993	Most titles (4)	David Ferrer; Thomas Muster	27 February
Mexican Open	1993	Most finals (5)	David Ferrer	27 February
ATP Tour	1970	Most titles won without losing a set (30)	Stands alone	27 February
ATP 500	2009	Most match wins (117)	Stands alone	27 February
Masters 1000	1990	Most match wins (406)	Stands alone	14 March

== Personal bests ==
- Best match win streak at the start of a season (20)

== See also ==
- 2022 ATP Tour
- 2022 Novak Djokovic tennis season
- 2022 Daniil Medvedev tennis season
- 2022 Carlos Alcaraz tennis season
