= 2022 Daniil Medvedev tennis season =

Tennis tournament

- Full name: Daniil Medvedev
- Country: Russia (not allowed to play under the Russian flag from March)
- Calendar prize money: $4,178,523

Singles
- Season record: 45–19
- Calendar titles: 2
- Year-end ranking: No. 7
- Ranking change from previous year: ▼5

Grand Slam & significant results
- Australian Open: F
- French Open: 4R
- Wimbledon: A (Note: Russian athletes were banned from competing following the 2022 Russian invasion of Ukraine.)
- US Open: 4R

Doubles
- Season record: 3–3
- Current ranking: No. 407
- Ranking change from previous year: ▼127

The 2022 Daniil Medvedev tennis season officially began on 3 January 2022, with the start of the ATP Cup.

Fresh off winning his first major at the 2021 US Open, Medvedev reached the final of the 2022 Australian Open, losing to Rafael Nadal in five epic sets.

He clinched the world number 1 ranking for 16 weeks.

== Yearly summary ==
=== Early hard court season ===
==== Australian Open ====
Medvedev started the Australian open with a straight set win against Henri Laaksonen and four-set win against Nick Kyrigios. Medvedev lost in the final to Nadal in five epic sets.

==== Mexican Open ====
Medvedev lost in the semifinals to Nadal.

==== Indian Wells Masters ====
Medvedev lost in the third round to Gaël Monfils.

==== Miami Open ====
Medvedev lost in the quarterfinal to the defending champion Hubert Hurkacz.

=== Clay Court Season ===
==== Monte-Carlo Masters ====
Medvedev withdrew after choosing to have a hernia surgery which would keep him out of action for one to two months.

=== North American hard court season ===
==== Los Cabos Open ====
Daniil Medvedev defeated the defending champion Cameron Norrie in the final, 7–5, 6–0 to win the men's singles title at the 2022 Los Cabos Open. It was his career's fourteenth ATP title.

==== Canadian Open ====
Medvedev was the defending champion, but lost in the second round to Nick Kyrgios.

==== Cincinnati Masters ====
At the Cincinnati Masters, Medvedev was defeated by Stefanos Tsitsipas in the semifinals.

==== US Open ====
Medvedev was yet again defeated by Kyrgios at the US Open in the fourth round, resulting in Medvedev losing his number one ranking.

== All matches ==
This table chronicles all the matches of Daniil Medvedev in 2022.

Key
| W | F | SF | QF | #R | RR | Q# | P# | DNQ | A | Z# | PO | G | S | B | NMS | NTI | P | NH |

(W) winner; (F) finalist; (SF) semifinalist; (QF) quarterfinalist; (#R) rounds 4, 3, 2, 1; (RR) round-robin stage; (Q#) qualification round; (P#) preliminary round; (DNQ) did not qualify; (A) absent; (Z#) Davis/Fed Cup Zonal Group (with number indication) or (PO) play-off; (G) gold, (S) silver or (B) bronze Olympic/Paralympic medal; (NMS) not a Masters tournament; (NTI) not a Tier I tournament; (P) postponed; (NH) not held; (SR) strike rate (events won / competed); (W–L) win–loss record.
To avoid confusion and double counting, these charts are updated at the conclusion of a tournament or when the player's participation has ended.

=== Singles matches ===
| Tournament | Match | Round | Opponent (seed or key) | Rank | Result | Score |
|---|---|---|---|---|---|---|
ATP Cup; Sydney, Australia; ATP Cup; Hard, outdoor 1–9 January 2022
| ATP Cup; Sydney, Australia; ATP Cup; Hard, outdoor 1–9 January 2022 | 1 / 322 | RR | (France) Ugo Humbert | 35 | Loss | 7–6^{(7–5)}, 5–7, 6–7^{(2–7)} |
| ATP Cup; Sydney, Australia; ATP Cup; Hard, outdoor 1–9 January 2022 | 2 / 323 | RR | (Australia) Alex de Minaur | 34 | Win | 6–4, 6–2 |
| ATP Cup; Sydney, Australia; ATP Cup; Hard, outdoor 1–9 January 2022 | 3 / 324 | RR | (Italy) Matteo Berrettini | 7 | Win | 6–2, 6–7^{(5–7)}, 6–4 |
| ATP Cup; Sydney, Australia; ATP Cup; Hard, outdoor 1–9 January 2022 | 4 / 325 | SF | (Canada) Félix Auger-Aliassime | 11 | Win | 6–4, 6–0 |
Australian Open; Melbourne, Australia; Grand Slam tournament Hard, outdoor 17–30 January 2022
| Australian Open; Melbourne, Australia; Grand Slam tournament Hard, outdoor 17–30 January 2022 | 5 / 326 | 1R | (Switzerland) Henri Laaksonen | 91 | Win | 6–1, 6–4, 7–6^{(7–3)} |
| Australian Open; Melbourne, Australia; Grand Slam tournament Hard, outdoor 17–30 January 2022 | 6 / 327 | 2R | (Australia) Nick Kyrgios | 115 | Win | 7–6^{(7–1)}, 6–4, 4–6, 6–2 |
| Australian Open; Melbourne, Australia; Grand Slam tournament Hard, outdoor 17–30 January 2022 | 7 / 328 | 3R | (Netherlands) Botic van de Zandschulp | 57 | Win | 6–4, 6–4, 6–2 |
| Australian Open; Melbourne, Australia; Grand Slam tournament Hard, outdoor 17–30 January 2022 | 8 / 329 | 4R | (United States) Maxime Cressy | 70 | Win | 6–2, 7–6^{(7–4)}, 6–7^{(4–7)}, 7–5 |
| Australian Open; Melbourne, Australia; Grand Slam tournament Hard, outdoor 17–30 January 2022 | 9 / 330 | QF | (Canada) Félix Auger-Aliassime (9) | 9 | Win | 6–7^{(4–7)}, 3–6, 7–6^{(7–2)}, 7–5, 6–4 |
| Australian Open; Melbourne, Australia; Grand Slam tournament Hard, outdoor 17–30 January 2022 | 10 / 331 | SF | (Greece) Stefanos Tsitsipas (4) | 4 | Win | 7–6^{(7–5)}, 4–6, 6–4, 6–1 |
| Australian Open; Melbourne, Australia; Grand Slam tournament Hard, outdoor 17–30 January 2022 | 11 / 332 | F | (Spain) Rafael Nadal (6) | 5 | Loss | 6–2, 7–6^{(7–5)}, 4–6, 4–6, 5–7 |
Mexican Open; Acapulco, Mexico; ATP 500; Hard, outdoor 21–26 February 2022
| Mexican Open; Acapulco, Mexico; ATP 500; Hard, outdoor 21–26 February 2022 | 12 / 333 | 1R | (France) Benoît Paire | 49 | Win | 6–3, 6–4 |
| Mexican Open; Acapulco, Mexico; ATP 500; Hard, outdoor 21–26 February 2022 | 13 / 334 | 2R | (Spain) Pablo Andújar (PR) | 68 | Win | 6–1, 6–2 |
| Mexican Open; Acapulco, Mexico; ATP 500; Hard, outdoor 21–26 February 2022 | 14 / 335 | QF | (Japan) Yoshihito Nishioka (Q) | 103 | Win | 6–2, 6–3 |
| Mexican Open; Acapulco, Mexico; ATP 500; Hard, outdoor 21–26 February 2022 | 15 / 336 | SF | (Spain) Rafael Nadal (4) | 5 | Loss | 3–6, 3–6 |
Indian Wells Masters; Indian Wells, United States; ATP 1000; Hard, outdoor 10–20 March 2022
| Indian Wells Masters; Indian Wells, United States; ATP 1000; Hard, outdoor 10–20 March 2022 | – | 1R | Bye | | | |
| Indian Wells Masters; Indian Wells, United States; ATP 1000; Hard, outdoor 10–20 March 2022 | 16 / 337 | 2R | (Czech Republic) Tomáš Macháč (Q) | 158 | Win | 6–3, 6–2 |
| Indian Wells Masters; Indian Wells, United States; ATP 1000; Hard, outdoor 10–20 March 2022 | 17 / 338 | 3R | (France) Gaël Monfils (26) | 28 | Loss | 6–4, 3–6, 1–6 |
Miami Open; Miami Gardens, United States; ATP 1000; Hard, outdoor 21–23 April 2022
| Miami Open; Miami Gardens, United States; ATP 1000; Hard, outdoor 21–23 April 2022 | – | 1R | Bye | | | |
| Miami Open; Miami Gardens, United States; ATP 1000; Hard, outdoor 21–23 April 2022 | 18 / 339 | 2R | (United Kingdom) Andy Murray (WC) | 85 | Win | 6–4, 6–2 |
| Miami Open; Miami Gardens, United States; ATP 1000; Hard, outdoor 21–23 April 2022 | 19 / 340 | 3R | (Spain) Pedro Martínez | 47 | Win | 6–3, 6–4 |
| Miami Open; Miami Gardens, United States; ATP 1000; Hard, outdoor 21–23 April 2022 | 20 / 341 | 4R | (United States) Jenson Brooksby | 39 | Win | 7–5, 6–1 |
| Miami Open; Miami Gardens, United States; ATP 1000; Hard, outdoor 21–23 April 2022 | 21 / 342 | QF | (Poland) Hubert Hurkacz (8) | 10 | Loss | 6–7^{(7–9)}, 3–6 |
Monte-Carlo Masters; Monte Carlo, Monaco; ATP 1000; Clay, outdoor 10–17 April 2022
| Monte-Carlo Masters; Monte Carlo, Monaco; ATP 1000; Clay, outdoor 10–17 April 2022 | Withdrew | | | | | |
Madrid Open; Madrid, Spain; ATP 1000; Clay, outdoor 2–8 May 2022
| Madrid Open; Madrid, Spain; ATP 1000; Clay, outdoor 2–8 May 2022 | Withdrew | | | | | |
Italian Open; Rome, Italy; ATP 1000; Clay, outdoor 8–15 May 2022
| Italian Open; Rome, Italy; ATP 1000; Clay, outdoor 8–15 May 2022 | Withdrew | | | | | |
Geneva Open; Geneva, Switzerland; ATP 250; Clay, outdoor 16–22 May 2022
| Geneva Open; Geneva, Switzerland; ATP 250; Clay, outdoor 16–22 May 2022 | – | 1R | Bye | | | |
| Geneva Open; Geneva, Switzerland; ATP 250; Clay, outdoor 16–22 May 2022 | 22 / 343 | 2R | (France) Richard Gasquet | 75 | Loss | 2–6, 6–7^{(5–7)} |
French Open; Paris, France; Grand Slam tournament Clay, outdoor 22 May – 5 June 2022
| French Open; Paris, France; Grand Slam tournament Clay, outdoor 22 May – 5 June 2022 | 23 / 344 | 1R | (Argentina) Facundo Bagnis | 103 | Win | 6–2, 6–2, 6–2 |
| French Open; Paris, France; Grand Slam tournament Clay, outdoor 22 May – 5 June 2022 | 24 / 345 | 2R | (Serbia) Laslo Đere | 56 | Win | 6–3, 6–4, 6–3 |
| French Open; Paris, France; Grand Slam tournament Clay, outdoor 22 May – 5 June 2022 | 25 / 346 | 3R | (Serbia) Miomir Kecmanović (28) | 31 | Win | 6–2, 6–4, 6–2 |
| French Open; Paris, France; Grand Slam tournament Clay, outdoor 22 May – 5 June 2022 | 26 / 347 | 4R | (Croatia) Marin Čilić (20) | 23 | Loss | 2–6, 3–6, 2–6 |
Libéma Open 's-Hertogenbosch, Netherlands; ATP 250; Grass, outdoor 6–12 June 2022
| Libéma Open 's-Hertogenbosch, Netherlands; ATP 250; Grass, outdoor 6–12 June 2022 | – | 1R | Bye | | | |
| Libéma Open 's-Hertogenbosch, Netherlands; ATP 250; Grass, outdoor 6–12 June 2022 | 27 / 348 | 2R | (France) Gilles Simon (Q) | 134 | Win | 7–5, 6–4 |
| Libéma Open 's-Hertogenbosch, Netherlands; ATP 250; Grass, outdoor 6–12 June 2022 | 28 / 349 | QF | Ilya Ivashka | 49 | Win | 7–6^{(10–8)}, 6–4 |
| Libéma Open 's-Hertogenbosch, Netherlands; ATP 250; Grass, outdoor 6–12 June 2022 | 29 / 350 | SF | (France) Adrian Mannarino | 70 | Win | 7–5, 7–5 |
| Libéma Open 's-Hertogenbosch, Netherlands; ATP 250; Grass, outdoor 6–12 June 2022 | 30 / 351 | F | (Netherlands) Tim van Rijthoven (WC) | 205 | Loss | 4–6, 1–6 |
Halle Open; Halle, Germany; ATP 500; Grass, outdoor 13–19 June 2022
| Halle Open; Halle, Germany; ATP 500; Grass, outdoor 13–19 June 2022 | 31 / 352 | 1R | (Belgium) David Goffin | 39 | Win | 6–3, 6–2 |
| Halle Open; Halle, Germany; ATP 500; Grass, outdoor 13–19 June 2022 | 32 / 353 | 2R | Ilya Ivashka | 42 | Win | 7–6^{(7–4)}, 6–3 |
| Halle Open; Halle, Germany; ATP 500; Grass, outdoor 13–19 June 2022 | 33 / 354 | QF | (Spain) Roberto Bautista Agut (7) | 20 | Win | 6–2, 6–4 |
| Halle Open; Halle, Germany; ATP 500; Grass, outdoor 13–19 June 2022 | 34 / 355 | SF | (Germany) Oscar Otte (SE) | 51 | Win | 7–6^{(7–3)}, 6–3 |
| Halle Open; Halle, Germany; ATP 500; Grass, outdoor 13–19 June 2022 | 35 / 356 | F | (Poland) Hubert Hurkacz (5) | 12 | Loss | 1–6, 4–6 |
Mallorca Championships; Mallorca, Spain; ATP 250; Grass, outdoor 20–26 June 2022
| Mallorca Championships; Mallorca, Spain; ATP 250; Grass, outdoor 20–26 June 2022 | – | 1R | Bye | | | |
| Mallorca Championships; Mallorca, Spain; ATP 250; Grass, outdoor 20–26 June 2022 | 36 / 357 | 2R | Aslan Karatsev | 43 | Win | 4–6, 6–3, 6–2 |
| Mallorca Championships; Mallorca, Spain; ATP 250; Grass, outdoor 20–26 June 2022 | 37 / 358 | QF | (Spain) Roberto Bautista Agut (5) | 20 | Loss | 3–6, 2–6 |
Wimbledon Championships; London, United Kingdom; Grand Slam tournament Grass, outdoor 27 June – 10 July 2022
| Wimbledon Championships; London, United Kingdom; Grand Slam tournament Grass, outdoor 27 June – 10 July 2022 | – | | | | | N/A |
Los Cabos Open; Cabo San Lucas, Mexico; ATP 250; Hard, outdoor 1–6 August 2022
| Los Cabos Open; Cabo San Lucas, Mexico; ATP 250; Hard, outdoor 1–6 August 2022 | – | 1R | Bye | | | |
| Los Cabos Open; Cabo San Lucas, Mexico; ATP 250; Hard, outdoor 1–6 August 2022 | 38 / 359 | 2R | (Australia) Rinky Hijikata (Q) | 224 | Win | 6–4, 6–3 |
| Los Cabos Open; Cabo San Lucas, Mexico; ATP 250; Hard, outdoor 1–6 August 2022 | 39 / 360 | QF | (Lithuania) Ričardas Berankis | 98 | Win | 6–2, 6–2 |
| Los Cabos Open; Cabo San Lucas, Mexico; ATP 250; Hard, outdoor 1–6 August 2022 | 40 / 361 | SF | (Serbia) Miomir Kecmanović (4) | 38 | Win | 7–6^{(7–0)}, 6–1 |
| Los Cabos Open; Cabo San Lucas, Mexico; ATP 250; Hard, outdoor 1–6 August 2022 | 41 / 362 | W | (United Kingdom) Cameron Norrie (3) | 12 | Win (1) | 7–5, 6–0 |
Canadian Open; Montreal, Canada; ATP 1000; Hard, outdoor 7–14 August 2022
| Canadian Open; Montreal, Canada; ATP 1000; Hard, outdoor 7–14 August 2022 | – | 1R | Bye | | | |
| Canadian Open; Montreal, Canada; ATP 1000; Hard, outdoor 7–14 August 2022 | 42 / 363 | 2R | (Australia) Nick Kyrgios | 37 | Loss | 7–6^{(7–2)}, 4–6, 2–6 |
Cincinnati Masters; Cincinnati, United States; ATP 1000; Hard, outdoor 14–21 August 2022
| Cincinnati Masters; Cincinnati, United States; ATP 1000; Hard, outdoor 14–21 August 2022 | – | 1R | Bye | | | |
| Cincinnati Masters; Cincinnati, United States; ATP 1000; Hard, outdoor 14–21 August 2022 | 43 / 364 | 2R | (Netherlands) Botic van de Zandschulp | 24 | Win | 6–4, 7–5 |
| Cincinnati Masters; Cincinnati, United States; ATP 1000; Hard, outdoor 14–21 August 2022 | 44 / 365 | 3R | (Canada) Denis Shapovalov | 21 | Win | 7–5, 7–5 |
| Cincinnati Masters; Cincinnati, United States; ATP 1000; Hard, outdoor 14–21 August 2022 | 45 / 366 | QF | (United States) Taylor Fritz (11) | 13 | Win | 7–6^{(7–1)}, 6–1 |
| Cincinnati Masters; Cincinnati, United States; ATP 1000; Hard, outdoor 14–21 August 2022 | 46 / 367 | SF | (Greece) Stefanos Tsitsipas (4) | 7 | Loss | 6–7^{(6–8)}, 6–3, 3–6 |
US Open; New York City, United States; Grand Slam tournament Hard, outdoor 29 August – 11 September 2022
| US Open; New York City, United States; Grand Slam tournament Hard, outdoor 29 August – 11 September 2022 | 47 / 368 | 1R | (United States) Stefan Kozlov | 111 | Win | 6–2, 6–4, 6–0 |
| US Open; New York City, United States; Grand Slam tournament Hard, outdoor 29 August – 11 September 2022 | 48 / 369 | 2R | (France) Arthur Rinderknech | 58 | Win | 6–2, 7–5, 6–3 |
| US Open; New York City, United States; Grand Slam tournament Hard, outdoor 29 August – 11 September 2022 | 49 / 370 | 3R | (China) Wu Yibing (Q) | 174 | Win | 6–4, 6–2, 6–2 |
| US Open; New York City, United States; Grand Slam tournament Hard, outdoor 29 August – 11 September 2022 | 50 / 371 | 4R | (Australia) Nick Kyrgios (23) | 25 | Loss | 6–7^{(11–13)}, 6–3, 3–6, 2–6 |
Moselle Open; Metz, France; ATP 250; Hard, indoor 19–25 September 2022
| Moselle Open; Metz, France; ATP 250; Hard, indoor 19–25 September 2022 | – | 1R | Bye | | | |
| Moselle Open; Metz, France; ATP 250; Hard, indoor 19–25 September 2022 | 51 / 372 | 2R | (Switzerland) Stan Wawrinka (Q) | 284 | Loss | 4–6, 7–6^{(9–7)}, 3–6 |
Astana Open; Astana, Kazakhstan; ATP 500; Hard, indoor 3–9 October 2022
| Astana Open; Astana, Kazakhstan; ATP 500; Hard, indoor 3–9 October 2022 | 52 / 373 | 1R | (Spain) Albert Ramos Viñolas | 40 | Win | 6–3, 6–1 |
| Astana Open; Astana, Kazakhstan; ATP 500; Hard, indoor 3–9 October 2022 | 53 / 374 | 2R | (Finland) Emil Ruusuvuori | 53 | Win | 6–3, 6–2 |
| Astana Open; Astana, Kazakhstan; ATP 500; Hard, indoor 3–9 October 2022 | 54 / 375 | QF | (Spain) Roberto Bautista Agut | 21 | Win | 6–1, 6–1 |
| Astana Open; Astana, Kazakhstan; ATP 500; Hard, indoor 3–9 October 2022 | 55 / 376 | SF | (Serbia) Novak Djokovic (4/WC) | 7 | Loss | 6–4, 6–7^{(6–8)}, ret. |
Vienna Open; Vienna, Austria; ATP 500; Hard, indoor 24–30 October 2022
| Vienna Open; Vienna, Austria; ATP 500; Hard, indoor 24–30 October 2022 | 56 / 377 | 1R | (Georgia (country)) Nikoloz Basilashvili | 94 | Win | 6–2, 6–2 |
| Vienna Open; Vienna, Austria; ATP 500; Hard, indoor 24–30 October 2022 | 57 / 378 | 2R | (Austria) Dominic Thiem | 113 | Win | 6–3, 6–3 |
| Vienna Open; Vienna, Austria; ATP 500; Hard, indoor 24–30 October 2022 | 58 / 379 | QF | (Italy) Jannik Sinner (6) | 12 | Win | 6–4, 6–2 |
| Vienna Open; Vienna, Austria; ATP 500; Hard, indoor 24–30 October 2022 | 59 / 380 | SF | (Bulgaria) Grigor Dimitrov | 32 | Win | 6–4, 6–2 |
| Vienna Open; Vienna, Austria; ATP 500; Hard, indoor 24–30 October 2022 | 60 / 381 | W | (Canada) Denis Shapovalov | 19 | Win (2) | 4–6, 6–3, 6–2 |
Paris Masters; Paris, France; ATP 1000; Hard, indoor 31 October – 6 November 2022
| Paris Masters; Paris, France; ATP 1000; Hard, indoor 31 October – 6 November 2022 | – | 1R | Bye | | | |
| Paris Masters; Paris, France; ATP 1000; Hard, indoor 31 October – 6 November 2022 | 61 / 382 | 2R | (Australia) Alex de Minaur | 25 | Loss | 4–6, 6–2, 5–7 |
ATP Finals; Turin, Italy; ATP Finals; Hard, indoor 13–20 November 2022
| ATP Finals; Turin, Italy; ATP Finals; Hard, indoor 13–20 November 2022 | 62 / 383 | RR | Andrey Rublev (6) | 7 | Loss | 7–6^{(9–7)}, 3–6, 6–7^{(7–9)} |
| ATP Finals; Turin, Italy; ATP Finals; Hard, indoor 13–20 November 2022 | 63 / 384 | RR | (Greece) Stefanos Tsitsipas (2) | 3 | Loss | 3–6, 7–6^{(13–11)}, 6–7^{(1–7)} |
| ATP Finals; Turin, Italy; ATP Finals; Hard, indoor 13–20 November 2022 | 64 / 385 | RR | (Serbia) Novak Djokovic (7) | 8 | Loss | 3–6, 7–6^{(7–5)}, 6–7^{(2–7)} |

=== Doubles matches ===
| Tournament | Match | Round | Opponents (seed or key) | Ranks | Result | Score |
|---|---|---|---|---|---|---|
ATP Cup; Sydney, Australia; ATP Cup; Hard, outdoor 1–9 January 2022; Partner: (Russia) Roman Safiullin
| ATP Cup; Sydney, Australia; ATP Cup; Hard, outdoor 1–9 January 2022; Partner: (Russia) Roman Safiullin | 1 / 34 | RR | (France) Fabrice Martin / (France) Édouard Roger-Vasselin | 27 / 42 | Won | 6–4, 6–4 |
| ATP Cup; Sydney, Australia; ATP Cup; Hard, outdoor 1–9 January 2022; Partner: (Russia) Roman Safiullin | 2 / 35 | RR | (Australia) John Peers / (Australia) Luke Saville | 13 / 23 | Win | 7–6^{(9–7)}, 3–6, 10–6 |
| ATP Cup; Sydney, Australia; ATP Cup; Hard, outdoor 1–9 January 2022; Partner: (Russia) Roman Safiullin | 3 / 36 | RR | (Italy) Matteo Berrettini / (Italy) Jannik Sinner | 271 / 132 | Win | 5–7, 6–4, 10–5 |
| ATP Cup; Sydney, Australia; ATP Cup; Hard, outdoor 1–9 January 2022; Partner: (Russia) Roman Safiullin | 4 / 37 | SF | (Canada) Félix Auger-Aliassime / (Canada) Denis Shapovalov | 134 / 82 | Loss | 6–4, 5–7, 7–10 |
Libéma Open 's-Hertogenbosch, Netherlands; ATP 250; Grass, outdoor 6–12 June 2022; Partner: (Netherlands) Tallon Griekspoor
| Libéma Open 's-Hertogenbosch, Netherlands; ATP 250; Grass, outdoor 6–12 June 2022; Partner: (Netherlands) Tallon Griekspoor | 5 / 38 | 1R | (Netherlands) Robin Haase / (Netherlands) Matwé Middelkoop | 58 / 29 | Loss | 4–6, 4–6 |
Halle Open; Halle, Germany; ATP 500; Grass, outdoor 13–19 June 2022; Partner: (Canada) Félix Auger-Aliassime
| Halle Open; Halle, Germany; ATP 500; Grass, outdoor 13–19 June 2022; Partner: (Canada) Félix Auger-Aliassime | 6 / 39 | 1R | (El Salvador) Marcelo Arévalo / (Netherlands) Jean-Julien Rojer (2) | 10 / 11 | Loss | 3–6, 4–6 |

== Schedule ==
Per Daniil Medvedev, this is his current 2022 schedule (subject to change).

=== Singles schedule ===
| Date | Tournament | Location | Tier | Surface | Prev. result | Prev. points | New points | Result |
|---|---|---|---|---|---|---|---|---|
| 3 January 2022– 9 January 2022 | ATP Cup | Sydney (AUS) | ATP Cup | Hard | W | 500 | 295 | Semifinals (lost to Canada, 1–2) |
| 17 January 2022– 30 January 2022 | Australian Open | Melbourne (AUS) | Grand Slam | Hard | F | 1200 | 1200 | Final (lost to (Spain) Rafael Nadal, 6–2, 7–6^{(7–5)}, 4–6, 4–6, 5–7) |
| 7 February 2022– 13 February 2022 | Rotterdam Open | Rotterdam (NED) | 500 Series | Hard (i) | R32 | 0 | 0 | Withdrew |
| 14 February 2022– 20 February 2022 | Open 13 | Marseille (FRA) | 250 series | Hard (i) | W | 250 | 0 | Withdrew |
| 21 February 2022– 26 February 2022 | Mexican Open | Acapulco (MEX) | 500 Series | Hard | N/A | 0 | 180 | Semifinals (lost to (Spain) Rafael Nadal, 3–6, 3–6) |
| 10 March 2022– 20 March 2022 | Indian Wells Masters | Indian Wells (USA) | Masters 1000 | Hard | R16 | 90 | 45 | Third round (lost to (France) Gaël Monfils, 6–4, 3–6, 1–6) |
| 23 March 2022– 3 April 2022 | Miami Open | Miami Gardens (USA) | Masters 1000 | Hard | QF | 180 | 180 | Quarterfinals (lost to (Poland) Hubert Hurkacz, 6–7^{(7–9)}, 3–6) |
| 10 April 2022– 17 April 2022 | Monte-Carlo Masters | Roquebrune-Cap-Martin (FRA) | Masters 1000 | Clay | A | 0 (180 (Note: Points carried over due to the Best of 24-month ranking being used for events between 4 March – 5 August 2019, that were not played in 2020, but weighted at 50%.)) | 0 | Withdrew |
| 2 May 2022– 8 May 2022 | Madrid Open | Madrid (ESP) | Masters 1000 | Clay | R16 | 90 | 0 | Withdrew |
| 8 May 2022– 15 May 2022 | Italian Open | Rome (ITA) | Masters 1000 | Clay | R32 | 10 | 0 | Withdrew |
| 16 May 2022– 22 May 2022 | Geneva Open | Geneva (SUI) | 250 series | Clay | N/A | 0 | 0 | Second round (lost to (France) Richard Gasquet, 2–6, 6–7^{(5–7)}) |
| 22 May 2022– 5 June 2022 | French Open | Paris (FRA) | Grand Slam | Clay | QF | 360 | 180 | Fourth round (lost to (Croatia) Marin Čilić, 2–6, 3–6, 2–6) |
| 6 June 2022– 12 June 2022 | Libéma Open | 's-Hertogenbosch (NED) | 250 series | Grass | N/A | 0 | 150 | Final (lost to (Netherlands) Tim van Rijthoven, 4–6, 1–6) |
| 13 June 2022– 19 June 2022 | Halle Open | Halle (GER) | 500 Series | Grass | N/A | 0 | 300 | Final (lost to (Poland) Hubert Hurkacz, 1–6, 4–6) |
| 20 June 2022– 26 June 2022 | Mallorca Championships | Mallorca (ESP) | 250 series | Grass | W | 250 | 45 | Quarterfinals (lost to (Spain) Roberto Bautista Agut, 3–6, 2–6) |
| 27 June 2022– 10 July 2022 | Wimbledon | London (GBR) | Grand Slam | Grass | R16 | 180 | 0 (Note: Removal Of ATP Rankings Points From 2022 Wimbledon.) | Withdrew |
| 1 August 2022– 6 August 2022 | Los Cabos Open | Mexico (MEX) | 250 series | Hard | N/A | 0 | 250 | Champion (defeated (United Kingdom) Cameron Norrie 7–5, 6–0) |
| 8 August 2022– 14 August 2022 | Canadian Open | Toronto (CAN) | Masters 1000 | Hard | W | 1000 | 10 | Second round (lost to (Australia) Nick Kyrgios 7–6^{(7–2)}, 4–6, 2–6) |
| 14 August 2022– 21 August 2022 | Cincinnati Masters | Cincinnati (USA) | Masters 1000 | Hard | SF | 360 | 360 | Semifinals (lost to (Greece) Stefanos Tsitsipas 6–7^{(6–8)}, 6–3, 3–6) |
| 29 August 2022– 11 September 2022 | US Open | New York (USA) | Grand Slam | Hard | W | 2000 | 180 | Fourth round (lost to (Australia) Nick Kyrgios 6–7^{(11–13)}, 6–3, 3–6, 2–6) |
| 19 September 2022– 25 September 2022 | Moselle Open | Metz (FRA) | 250 series | Hard (i) | N/A | 0 | 0 | Second round (lost to (Switzerland) Stan Wawrinka 4–6, 7–6^{(9–7)}, 3–6) |
| 3 October 2022– 9 October 2022 | Astana Open | Astana (KAZ) | 500 series | Hard (i) | N/A | 0 | 180 | Semifinals (lost to (Serbia) Novak Djokovic 6–4, 6–7^{(6–8)}, ret.) |
| 24 October 2022– 30 October 2022 | Vienna Open | Vienna (AUT) | 500 Series | Hard (i) | N/A | 0 | 500 | Champion (defeated (Canada) Denis Shapovalov 4–6, 6–3, 6–2) |
| 31 October 2022– 6 November 2022 | Paris Masters | Paris (FRA) | Masters 1000 | Hard (i) | F | 600 | 10 | Second round (lost to (Australia) Alex de Minaur 4–6, 6–2, 5–7) |
| 13 November 2022– 20 November 2022 | ATP Finals | Turin (ITA) | Tour Finals | Hard (i) | F | 1000 | 0 | Round robin (0 wins – 3 losses) |
| Total year-end points | | | | | | 8640 | 4065 | ▼4575 difference |

== Yearly records ==
=== Head-to-head matchups ===
Daniil Medvedev has a 45–19 ATP match win–loss record in the 2022 season. His record against players who were part of the ATP rankings Top Ten at the time of their meetings is 3–8. Bold indicates player was ranked top 10 at the time of at least one meeting. The following list is ordered by number of wins:

- **(Canada) Félix Auger-Aliassime** 2–0
- (Belarus) Ilya Ivashka 2–0
- (Serbia) Miomir Kecmanović 2–0
- (Canada) Denis Shapovalov 2–0
- (Netherlands) Botic van de Zandschulp 2–0
- (Spain) Roberto Bautista Agut 2–1
- (Spain) Pablo Andújar 1–0
- (Argentina) Facundo Bagnis 1–0
- (Georgia (country)) Nikoloz Basilashvili 1–0
- (Lithuania) Ričardas Berankis 1–0
- **(Italy) Matteo Berrettini** 1–0
- (United States) Jenson Brooksby 1–0
- (United States) Maxime Cressy 1–0
- (Bulgaria) Grigor Dimitrov 1–0
- (Serbia) Laslo Đere 1–0
- (United States) Taylor Fritz 1–0
- (Belgium) David Goffin 1–0
- (Australia) Rinky Hijikata 1–0
- (Russia) Aslan Karatsev 1–0
- (Russia) Karen Khachanov 1–0
- (United States) Stefan Kozlov 1–0
- (Switzerland) Henri Laaksonen 1–0
- (Czech Republic) Tomáš Macháč 1–0
- (France) Adrian Mannarino 1–0
- (Spain) Pedro Martínez 1–0
- (Australia) Alex de Minaur 1–1
- (United Kingdom) Andy Murray 1–0
- (Japan) Yoshihito Nishioka 1–0
- (United Kingdom) Cameron Norrie 1–0
- (Germany) Oscar Otte 1–0
- (France) Arthur Rinderknech 1–0
- (Finland) Emil Ruusuvuori 1–0
- (France) Gilles Simon 1–0
- (Italy) Jannik Sinner 1–0
- (Austria) Dominic Thiem 1–0
- (China) Wu Yibing 1–0
- (Spain) Albert Ramos Viñolas 1–0
- (Australia) Nick Kyrgios 1–2
- **(Greece) Stefanos Tsitsipas** 1–2
- (Croatia) Marin Čilić 0–1
- (France) Richard Gasquet 0–1
- (France) Ugo Humbert 0–1
- (France) Gaël Monfils 0–1
- (Netherlands) Tim van Rijthoven 0–1
- **Andrey Rublev** 0–1
- (Switzerland) Stan Wawrinka 0–1
- **(Serbia) Novak Djokovic** 0–2
- **(Poland) Hubert Hurkacz** 0–2
- **(Spain) Rafael Nadal** 0–2

* Statistics correct as of 18 November 2022.

=== Top 10 wins ===
| Category Grand Slam (2–0) ATP Finals (0–0) Masters 1000 (0–0) 500 Series (0–0) 250 Series (0–0) ATP Cup (1–0) | Titles by surface Hard (3–0) Clay (0–0) Grass (0–0) | Titles by setting Outdoor (3–0) Indoor (0–0) |

| # | Player | Rank | Event | Surface | Rd | Score | DMR |
|---|---|---|---|---|---|---|---|
| 1/27 | (Italy) Matteo Berrettini | 7 | ATP Cup, Sydney, Australia | Hard | RR | 6–2, 6–7^{(5–7)}, 6–4 | 2 |
| 2/28 | (Canada) Félix Auger-Aliassime | 9 | Australian Open, Melbourne, Australia | Hard | QF | 6–7^{(4–7)}, 3–6, 7–6^{(7–2)}, 7–5, 6–4 | 2 |
| 3/29 | (Greece) Stefanos Tsitsipas | 4 | Australian Open, Melbourne, Australia | Hard | SF | 7–6^{(7–5)}, 4–6, 6–4, 6–1 | 2 |

=== Finals ===
==== Singles: 5 (2 title, 3 runners-up) ====
| Category Grand Slam (0–1) ATP Finals (0–0) Masters 1000 (0–0) 500 Series (1–1) 250 Series (1–1) | Titles by surface Hard (2–1) Clay (0–0) Grass (0–2) | Titles by setting Outdoor (1–3) Indoor (1–0) |

| Result | W–L | Date | Tournament | Tier | Surface | Opponent | Score |
|---|---|---|---|---|---|---|---|
| Loss | 0–1 | Jan 2022 | Australian Open, Australia | Grand Slam | Hard | (Spain) Rafael Nadal | 6–2, 7–6^{(7–5)}, 4–6, 4–6, 5–7 |
| Loss | 0–2 | Jun 2022 | s'Hertogenbosch, Netherlands | 250 Series | Grass | (Netherlands) Tim van Rijthoven | 4–6, 1–6 |
| Loss | 0–3 | Jun 2022 | Halle Open, Germany | 500 Series | Grass | (Poland) Hubert Hurkacz | 1–6, 4–6 |
| Win | 1–3 | Aug 2022 | Los Cabos Open, Mexico | 250 Series | Hard | (United Kingdom) Cameron Norrie | 7–5, 6–0 |
| Win | 2–3 | Oct 2022 | Vienna Open, Austria | 500 Series | Hard (i) | (Canada) Denis Shapovalov | 4–6, 6–3, 6–2 |

=== Earnings ===
- **Bold** font denotes tournament win

**Singles**
| Event | Prize money | Year-to-date |
| ATP Cup | $489,000 | $489,000 |
| Australian Open | A$1,575,000 | $1,623,630 |
| Mexican Open | $89,985 | $1,713,615 |
| Indian Wells Masters | $54,400 | $1,768,015 |
| Miami Open | $179,940 | $1,947,955 |
| Geneva Open | €9,380 | $1,957,726 |
| French Open | €220,000 | $2,192,114 |
| Libéma Open | €57,505 | $2,253,748 |
| Halle Open | €214,775 | $2,479,562 |
| Mallorca Championships | €26,795 | $2,507,670 |
| **Los Cabos Open** | **$125,040** | $2,632,710 |
| Canadian Open | $42,760 | $2,675,470 |
| Cincinnati Masters | $289,655 | $2,965,125 |
| US Open | $278,000 | $3,243,125 |
| Moselle Open | €9,380 | $3,252,517 |
| Astana Open | $101,890 | $3,354,407 |
| **Vienna Open** | **€439,305** | $3,787,386 |
| Paris Masters | €39,070 | $3,826,311 |
| ATP Finals | $320,000 | $4,146,311 |
| | | $4,146,311 |
**Doubles**
| Event | Prize money | Year-to-date |
| ATP Cup | $25,500 | $25,500 |
| Libéma Open | €1,770 | $27,397 |
| Halle Open | €4,580 | $32,212 |
| | | $32,212 |
**Total**
| | | **$4,178,523** |

Figures in United States dollars (USD) unless noted.

- source：2022 Singles Activity
- source：2022 Doubles Activity

== See also ==
- 2022 ATP Tour
- 2022 Rafael Nadal tennis season
- 2022 Novak Djokovic tennis season
- 2022 Carlos Alcaraz tennis season
