= 2022 Western & Southern Open – Women's doubles =

Women's doubles
- 2022 Western & Southern Open

Final
- Champions: (Ukraine) Lyudmyla Kichenok (Latvia) Jeļena Ostapenko
- Runners-up: (United States) Nicole Melichar-Martinez (Australia) Ellen Perez
- Score: 7–6^{(7–5)}, 6–3

Details
- Seeds: 8

Events
Singles	men	women
Doubles	men	women
← 2021 ·	Western & Southern Open	· 2023 →

Lyudmyla Kichenok and Jeļena Ostapenko defeated Nicole Melichar-Martinez and Ellen Perez in the final, 7–6^{(7–5)}, 6–3 to win the women's doubles tennis title at the 2022 Cincinnati Open.

Samantha Stosur and Zhang Shuai were the defending champions, but chose not to compete together. Stosur partnered Latisha Chan, but they lost in the first round to Anna Danilina and Beatriz Haddad Maia. Zhang partnered Ena Shibahara, they lost in the second round to Danilina and Haddad Maia.

Coco Gauff, Elise Mertens and Kateřina Siniaková were in contention for the WTA No. 1 doubles ranking. Gauff retained the top ranking despite withdrawing from the tournament, following Siniaková's loss in the second round and Mertens' loss in the semifinals.

== Seeds ==
The top four seeds received a bye into the second round.

1. Veronika Kudermetova / (Belgium) Elise Mertens (semifinals)
2. (Czech Republic) Barbora Krejčíková / (Czech Republic) Kateřina Siniaková (second round)
3. (Japan) Ena Shibahara / (China) Zhang Shuai (second round)
4. (United States) Coco Gauff / (United States) Jessica Pegula (withdrew)
5. (Canada) Gabriela Dabrowski / (Mexico) Giuliana Olmos (quarterfinals)
6. (United States) Desirae Krawczyk / (Netherlands) Demi Schuurs (semifinals)
7. (Ukraine) Lyudmyla Kichenok / (Latvia) Jeļena Ostapenko (champions)
8. (China) Xu Yifan / (China) Yang Zhaoxuan (second round)

== Draw ==
=== Key ===
- Q = Qualifier
- WC = Wild card
- LL = Lucky loser
- Alt = Alternate
- ITF = ITF entry
- PR = Protected ranking
- SR = Special ranking
- SE = Special exempt
- JE = Junior exempt
- JR = Junior Accelerator Programme entrant
- CO = College Accelerator Programme entrant
- NG = Next Gen Accelerator Program entrant
- w/o = Walkover
- r = Retired
- d = Defaulted

=== Finals ===
Semifinals
1	Veronika Kudermetova (Belgium) Elise Mertens	6	6^{5}	[5]
7	(Ukraine) Lyudmyla Kichenok (Latvia) Jeļena Ostapenko	4	7^{7}	[10]
6	(United States) Desirae Krawczyk (Netherlands) Demi Schuurs	5	4
(United States) Nicole Melichar-Martinez (Australia) Ellen Perez	7	6

Final
7	(Ukraine) Lyudmyla Kichenok (Latvia) Jeļena Ostapenko	7^{7}	6
(United States) Nicole Melichar-Martinez (Australia) Ellen Perez	6^{5}	3

=== Top half ===
First round
(Czech Republic) M Bouzková (Germany) L Siegemund	6	6^{7}	[10]
(Poland) A Rosolska (New Zealand) E Routliffe	3	7^{9}	[7]
(Japan) E Hozumi (Japan) M Ninomiya	4	6^{5}
(Romania) I-C Begu (Italy) M Trevisan	6	7^{7}
(France) A Cornet (Switzerland) J Teichmann	7	4	[7]
5	(Canada) G Dabrowski (Mexico) G Olmos	5	6	[10]
PR	(Chinese Taipei) L Chan (Australia) S Stosur	3	6^{5}
(Kazakhstan) A Danilina (Brazil) B Haddad Maia	6	7^{7}
(Czech Republic) L Hradecká (India) S Mirza	1	6	[11]
Alt	(France) C Garcia (Croatia) P Martić	6	3	[9]
PR	(Belgium) K Flipkens (Spain) S Sorribes Tormo	1	5
7	(Ukraine) L Kichenok (Latvia) J Ostapenko	6	7

Second round
1	V Kudermetova (Belgium) E Mertens	7^{8}	7^{7}
(Czech Republic) M Bouzková (Germany) L Siegemund	6^{6}	6^{4}
(Romania) I-C Begu (Italy) M Trevisan	1	4
5	(Canada) G Dabrowski (Mexico) G Olmos	6	6
3	(Japan) E Shibahara (China) S Zhang	3	3
(Kazakhstan) A Danilina (Brazil) B Haddad Maia	6	6
(Czech Republic) L Hradecká (India) S Mirza	2	4
7	(Ukraine) L Kichenok (Latvia) J Ostapenko	6	6

Quarterfinals
1	V Kudermetova (Belgium) E Mertens	6	1	[10]
5	(Canada) G Dabrowski (Mexico) G Olmos	2	6	[3]
(Kazakhstan) A Danilina (Brazil) B Haddad Maia	3	6	[8]
7	(Ukraine) L Kichenok (Latvia) J Ostapenko	6	3	[10]

Semifinals
1	V Kudermetova (Belgium) E Mertens	6	6^{5}	[5]
7	(Ukraine) L Kichenok (Latvia) J Ostapenko	4	7^{7}	[10]

=== Bottom half ===
First round
6	(United States) D Krawczyk (Netherlands) D Schuurs	6	4	[10]
(Serbia) A Krunić (Poland) M Linette	4	6	[6]
(United States) C Dolehide (Australia) S Sanders	2	6	[8]
(Estonia) A Kontaveit (United States) S Stephens	6	3	[10]
(Chile) A Guarachi (Slovenia) A Klepač	1	6	[9]
WC	(United States) J Aney (United States) I Neel	6	4	[11]
8	(China) Y Xu (China) Z Yang	4	6	[10]
(Georgia (country)) N Dzalamidze (Romania) M Niculescu	6	3	[6]
V Azarenka (Tunisia) O Jabeur	6	6
(Japan) S Aoyama (Chinese Taipei) H-c Chan	3	3
(United States) N Melichar-Martinez (Australia) E Perez	6	3	[10]
WC	(United States) C McNally (United States) T Townsend	0	6	[1]

Second round
6	(United States) D Krawczyk (Netherlands) D Schuurs	6	6
(Estonia) A Kontaveit (United States) S Stephens	4	1
WC	(United States) J Aney (United States) I Neel	4	7	[7]
Alt	E Alexandrova; A Sasnovich	6	5	[10]
8	(China) Y Xu (China) Z Yang	5	2
V Azarenka (Tunisia) O Jabeur	7	6
(United States) N Melichar-Martinez (Australia) E Perez	6	6
2	(Czech Republic) B Krejčíková (Czech Republic) K Siniaková	3	2

Quarterfinals
6	(United States) D Krawczyk (Netherlands) D Schuurs	6	6
Alt	E Alexandrova; A Sasnovich	1	3
V Azarenka (Tunisia) O Jabeur	4	6^{2}
(United States) N Melichar-Martinez (Australia) E Perez	6	7^{7}

Semifinals
6	(United States) D Krawczyk (Netherlands) D Schuurs	5	4
(United States) N Melichar-Martinez (Australia) E Perez	7	6

== Seeded teams ==
The following are the seeded teams, based on WTA rankings as of August 8, 2022.

Country	Player	Country	Player	Rank^{1}	Seed
	Veronika Kudermetova	BEL	Elise Mertens	5	1
CZE	Barbora Krejčíková	CZE	Kateřina Siniaková	10	2
JPN	Ena Shibahara	CHN	Zhang Shuai	11	3
~~USA~~	~~Coco Gauff~~	~~USA~~	~~Jessica Pegula~~	~~18~~	~~4~~
CAN	Gabriela Dabrowski	MEX	Giuliana Olmos	18	5
USA	Desirae Krawczyk	NED	Demi Schuurs	30	6
UKR	Lyudmyla Kichenok	LAT	Jeļena Ostapenko	31	7
CHN	Xu Yifan	CHN	Yang Zhaoxuan	31	8

== Other entry information ==
=== Wild cards ===
- (United States) Jessie Aney / (United States) Ingrid Neel
- (United States) Caty McNally / (United States) Taylor Townsend

=== Protected ranking ===
- (Chinese Taipei) Latisha Chan / (Australia) Samantha Stosur
- (Belgium) Kirsten Flipkens / (Spain) Sara Sorribes Tormo

=== Alternates ===
- Ekaterina Alexandrova / Aliaksandra Sasnovich
- (France) Caroline Garcia / (Croatia) Petra Martić

=== Withdrawals ===
- (United States) Coco Gauff / (United States) Jessica Pegula → replaced by Ekaterina Alexandrova / Aliaksandra Sasnovich
- (United Kingdom) Emma Raducanu / (Kazakhstan) Elena Rybakina → replaced by (France) Caroline Garcia / (Croatia) Petra Martić
