= 2022 Mallorca Championships – Singles =

Singles
- 2022 Mallorca Championships

Final
- Champion: (Greece) Stefanos Tsitsipas
- Runner-up: (Spain) Roberto Bautista Agut
- Score: 6–4, 3–6, 7–6^{(7–2)}

Details
- Draw: 28
- Seeds: 8

Events
| Singles | Doubles |
| ← 2021 · | Mallorca Championships | · 2023 → |

Stefanos Tsitsipas defeated Roberto Bautista Agut in the final, 6–4, 3–6, 7–6^{(7–2)} to win the singles title at the 2022 Mallorca Championships.

Daniil Medvedev was the defending champion, but lost in the quarterfinals to Bautista Agut.

== Seeds ==
The top four seeds receive a bye into the second round.

1. Daniil Medvedev (quarterfinals)
2. (Greece) Stefanos Tsitsipas (champion)
3. (Canada) Denis Shapovalov (second round)
4. (Spain) Pablo Carreño Busta (second round)
5. (Spain) Roberto Bautista Agut (final)
6. (Netherlands) Botic van de Zandschulp (first round)
7. (Serbia) Miomir Kecmanović (first round)
8. (Argentina) Sebastián Báez (second round)

== Draw ==
=== Key ===
- Q = Qualifier
- WC = Wild card
- LL = Lucky loser
- Alt = Alternate
- SE = Special exempt
- PR = Protected ranking
- ITF = ITF entry
- JE = Junior exempt
- w/o = Walkover
- r = Retired
- d = Defaulted
- SR = Special ranking

=== Finals ===
Semifinals
5 | (Spain) Roberto Bautista Agut | 7^{7} | 6
Q | (Switzerland) Antoine Bellier | 6^{5} | 2
(France) Benjamin Bonzi | 4 | 4
2/WC | (Greece) Stefanos Tsitsipas | 6 | 6

Final
5 | (Spain) Roberto Bautista Agut | 4 | 6 | 6^{2}
2/WC | (Greece) Stefanos Tsitsipas | 6 | 3 | 7^{7}

=== Top half ===
First round
WC | (Spain) J Munar | 6 | 1 | 3
A Karatsev | 3 | 6 | 6
SE | (Australia) N Kyrgios | 5 | 7^{7} | 7^{7}
(Serbia) L Đere | 7 | 6^{1} | 6^{1}
Q | (Japan) T Daniel | 4 | 6^{4}
5 | (Spain) R Bautista Agut | 6 | 7^{7}
(Argentina) F Delbonis | 3 | 6^{6}
Q | (Switzerland) A Bellier | 6 | 7^{8}
(Netherlands) T Griekspoor | 7^{7} | 7^{7}
WC | (Spain) F López | 6^{3} | 6^{3}
(Slovakia) A Molčan | 7 | 6
7 | (Serbia) M Kecmanović | 5 | 4

Second round
1 | D Medvedev | 4 | 6 | 6
A Karatsev | 6 | 3 | 2
SE | (Australia) N Kyrgios
5 | (Spain) R Bautista Agut | w/o
4 | (Spain) P Carreño Busta | 3 | 4
Q | (Switzerland) A Bellier | 6 | 6
(Netherlands) T Griekspoor | 0 | 6 | 7^{7}
(Slovakia) A Molčan | 6 | 3 | 6^{3}

Quarterfinals
1 | D Medvedev | 3 | 2
5 | (Spain) R Bautista Agut | 6 | 6
Q | (Switzerland) A Bellier | 5 | 7^{7} | 6
(Netherlands) T Griekspoor | 7 | 6^{5} | 2

Semifinals
5 | (Spain) R Bautista Agut | 7^{7} | 6
Q | (Switzerland) A Bellier | 6^{5} | 2

=== Bottom half ===
First round
8 | (Argentina) S Báez | 6 | 6
Q | (Australia) J Thompson | 3 | 4
(Germany) D Altmaier | 7 | 7^{7}
(Serbia) D Lajović | 5 | 6^{2}
Q | (Chile) A Tabilo | 3 | 2^{r}
(France) B Bonzi | 6 | 4
6 | (Netherlands) B van de Zandschulp | 7^{8} | 4 | 6^{2}
(United States) M Giron | 6^{6} | 6 | 7^{7}
(United States) M McDonald | 4 | 7 | 6
(Portugal) J Sousa | 6 | 5 | 1
I Ivashka | 6 | 6
(Finland) E Ruusuvuori | 4 | 1

Second round
8 | (Argentina) S Báez | 2 | 6 | 4
(Germany) D Altmaier | 6 | 2 | 6
(France) B Bonzi | 6 | 6
3 | (Canada) D Shapovalov | 4 | 1
(United States) M Giron | 4 | 7^{7} | 6
(United States) M McDonald | 6 | 6^{5} | 4
I Ivashka | 4 | 4
2/WC | (Greece) S Tsitsipas | 6 | 6

Quarterfinals
(Germany) D Altmaier | 3 | 4
(France) B Bonzi | 6 | 6
(United States) M Giron | 6^{5} | 6 | 3
2/WC | (Greece) S Tsitsipas | 7^{7} | 4 | 6

Semifinals
(France) B Bonzi | 4 | 4
2/WC | (Greece) S Tsitsipas | 6 | 6

== Qualifying ==
=== Seeds ===
1. (Georgia (country)) Nikoloz Basilashvili (first round)
2. (Australia) Jordan Thompson (qualified)
3. (Chile) Alejandro Tabilo (qualified)
4. (United States) Denis Kudla (qualifying competition)
5. (France) Quentin Halys (qualifying competition)
6. (Spain) Carlos Taberner (first round)
7. (Spain) Fernando Verdasco (qualifying competition)
8. (Japan) Taro Daniel (qualified)

=== Qualifiers ===
1. (Switzerland) Antoine Bellier
2. (Australia) Jordan Thompson
3. (Chile) Alejandro Tabilo
4. (Japan) Taro Daniel

=== Draw ===
==== First qualifier ====
First round
1/WC | (Georgia (country)) Nikoloz Basilashvili | 6^{5} | 6^{4}
Alt | (Germany) Mats Rosenkranz | 7^{7} | 7^{7}
Alt | (Switzerland) Antoine Bellier | 6 | 7^{7}
6 | (Spain) Carlos Taberner | 3 | 6^{0}

Qualifying competition
Alt | (Germany) Mats Rosenkranz | 6 | 6^{5} | 6^{7}
Alt | (Switzerland) Antoine Bellier | 4 | 7^{7} | 7^{9}

==== Second qualifier ====
First round
2/Alt | (Australia) Jordan Thompson | 6 | 6
Alt | (Sweden) Dragoș Nicolae Mădăraș | 1 | 1
Andrey Kuznetsov | 7^{7} | 1 | 6^{4}
5 | (France) Quentin Halys | 6^{3} | 6 | 7^{7}

Qualifying competition
2/Alt | (Australia) Jordan Thompson | 6 | 6
5 | (France) Quentin Halys | 2 | 0

==== Third qualifier ====
First round
3 | (Chile) Alejandro Tabilo | 3 | 6 | 6
(Austria) Lucas Miedler | 6 | 3 | 4
(Germany) Jan-Lennard Struff | 4 | 3
7 | (Spain) Fernando Verdasco | 6 | 6

Qualifying competition
3 | (Chile) Alejandro Tabilo | 6 | 6
7 | (Spain) Fernando Verdasco | 4 | 3

==== Fourth qualifier ====
First round
4 | (United States) Denis Kudla | 6 | 6
WC | (Spain) Marc Othman Ktiri | 0 | 1
Alt | (Finland) Otto Virtanen | 5 | 3
8 | (Japan) Taro Daniel | 7 | 6

Qualifying competition
4 | (United States) Denis Kudla | 6 | 4 | 3
8 | (Japan) Taro Daniel | 3 | 6 | 6
