= 2022 Mallorca Championships – Doubles =

Doubles
- 2022 Mallorca Championships

Final
- Champions: (Brazil) Rafael Matos (Spain) David Vega Hernández
- Runners-up: (Uruguay) Ariel Behar (Ecuador) Gonzalo Escobar
- Score: 7–6^{(7–5)}, 6–7^{(6–8)}, [10–1]

Events
Singles	Doubles
- Mallorca Championships

Rafael Matos and David Vega Hernández defeated Ariel Behar and Gonzalo Escobar in the final, 7–6^{(7–5)}, 6–7^{(6–8)}, [10–1] to win the doubles tennis title at the 2022 Mallorca Championships. The pair earned their second ATP Tour doubles title of the season and first grass victory together.

Simone Bolelli and Máximo González were the defending champions, but only González returned to defend his title, partnering with Andrey Golubev. They lost in the first round to Aslan Karatsev and Joran Vliegen.

== Seeds ==
1. (El Salvador) Marcelo Arévalo / (Netherlands) Jean-Julien Rojer (semifinals)
2. (Germany) Kevin Krawietz / (Germany) Andreas Mies (quarterfinals)
3. (Mexico) Santiago González / (Argentina) Andrés Molteni (first round)
4. (Kazakhstan) Andrey Golubev / (Argentina) Máximo González (first round)

== Draw ==
Key

- Q = Qualifier
- WC = Wild card
- LL = Lucky loser
- Alt = Alternate
- ITF = ITF entry
- PR = Protected ranking
- SR = Special ranking
- SE = Special exempt
- JE = Junior exempt
- JR = Junior Accelerator Programme entrant
- CO = College Accelerator Programme entrant
- NG = Next Gen Accelerator Program entrant
- w/o = Walkover
- r = Retired
- d = Defaulted

=== Draw ===
First round
1	(El Salvador) M Arévalo (Netherlands) J-J Rojer	6	6
WC	(Greece) Pe Tsitsipas (Greece) S Tsitsipas	3	4
WC	(Austria) A Erler (Austria) L Miedler	7	3	[10]
Alt	(Argentina) S Báez (Portugal) J Sousa	5	6	[4]
4	(Kazakhstan) A Golubev (Argentina) M González	6^{1}	6^{6}
A Karatsev (Belgium) J Vliegen	7^{7}	7^{8}
(Brazil) R Matos (Spain) D Vega Hernández	6	7^{7}
(Netherlands) T Griekspoor (Netherlands) B van de Zandschulp	3	6^{4}
(Australia) M Ebden (Austria) P Oswald	7	6
(Bosnia and Herzegovina) T Brkić (Serbia) N Ćaćić	5	1
(Spain) P Carreño Busta (Spain) J Munar	7^{7}	7^{7}
3	(Mexico) S González (Argentina) A Molteni	6^{4}	6^{5}
(France) F Martin (Monaco) H Nys	6^{3}	6	[8]
(Uruguay) A Behar (Ecuador) G Escobar	7^{7}	4	[10]
(South Africa) R Klaasen (Brazil) M Melo	7^{9}	3	[9]
2	(Germany) K Krawietz (Germany) A Mies	6^{7}	6	[11]

Quarterfinals
1	(El Salvador) M Arévalo (Netherlands) J-J Rojer	6	6
WC	(Austria) A Erler (Austria) L Miedler	1	4
A Karatsev (Belgium) J Vliegen	6	6^{3}	[5]
(Brazil) R Matos (Spain) D Vega Hernández	3	7^{7}	[10]
(Australia) M Ebden (Austria) P Oswald	6	2	[18]
(Spain) P Carreño Busta (Spain) J Munar	3	6	[16]
(Uruguay) A Behar (Ecuador) G Escobar	7^{7}	7^{13}
2	(Germany) K Krawietz (Germany) A Mies	6^{3}	6^{11}

Semifinals
1	(El Salvador) M Arévalo (Netherlands) J-J Rojer	4	6	[7]
(Brazil) R Matos (Spain) D Vega Hernández	6	3	[10]
(Australia) M Ebden (Austria) P Oswald	4	2
(Uruguay) A Behar (Ecuador) G Escobar	6	6

Final
(Brazil) R Matos (Spain) D Vega Hernández	7^{7}	6^{6}	[10]
(Uruguay) A Behar (Ecuador) G Escobar	6^{5}	7^{8}	[1]
