= 2022 Western & Southern Open – Men's doubles =

Men's doubles
- 2022 Western & Southern Open

Final
- Champions: (United States) Rajeev Ram (United Kingdom) Joe Salisbury
- Runners-up: (Germany) Tim Pütz (New Zealand) Michael Venus
- Score: 7–6^{(7–4)}, 7–6^{(7–5)}

Details
- Draw: 28 (3 WC )
- Seeds: 8

Events
Singles	men	women
Doubles	men	women
← 2021 ·	Western & Southern Open	· 2023 →

Rajeev Ram and Joe Salisbury defeated Tim Pütz and Michael Venus in the final, 7–6^{(7–4)}, 7–6^{(7–5)} to win the men's doubles tennis title at the 2022 Cincinnati Masters.

Marcel Granollers and Horacio Zeballos were the defending champions, but lost in the quarterfinals to Pütz and Venus.

Salisbury and Neal Skupski were in contention for the ATP no. 1 doubles ranking at the beginning of the tournament. Salisbury retained the top ranking after Skupski lost in the second round.

== Seeds ==
The top four seeds received a bye into the second round.

1. (United States) Rajeev Ram / (United Kingdom) Joe Salisbury (champions)
2. (Spain) Marcel Granollers / (Argentina) Horacio Zeballos (quarterfinals)
3. (Netherlands) Wesley Koolhof / (United Kingdom) Neal Skupski (second round)
4. (El Salvador) Marcelo Arévalo / (Netherlands) Jean-Julien Rojer (quarterfinals)
5. (Croatia) Nikola Mektić / (Croatia) Mate Pavić (second round)
6. (Germany) Tim Pütz / (New Zealand) Michael Venus (final)
7. (Croatia) Ivan Dodig / (United States) Austin Krajicek (first round)
8. (Colombia) Juan Sebastián Cabal / (Colombia) Robert Farah (first round)

== Draw ==
=== Key ===
- Q = Qualifier
- WC = Wild card
- LL = Lucky loser
- Alt = Alternate
- ITF = ITF entry
- PR = Protected ranking
- SR = Special ranking
- SE = Special exempt
- JE = Junior exempt
- JR = Junior Accelerator Programme entrant
- CO = College Accelerator Programme entrant
- NG = Next Gen Accelerator Program entrant
- w/o = Walkover
- r = Retired
- d = Defaulted

=== Finals ===
Semifinals
1	(United States) Rajeev Ram (United Kingdom) Joe Salisbury	6	7
PR	(Mexico) Santiago González (France) Édouard Roger-Vasselin	4	5
WC	(Denmark) Holger Rune (Greece) Stefanos Tsitsipas
6	(Germany) Tim Pütz (New Zealand) Michael Venus	w/o

Final
1	(United States) Rajeev Ram (United Kingdom) Joe Salisbury	7^{7}	7^{7}
6	(Germany) Tim Pütz (New Zealand) Michael Venus	6^{4}	6^{5}

=== Top half ===
First round
(Australia) T Kokkinakis (Australia) N Kyrgios	6	6
(Italy) S Bolelli (Italy) F Fognini	0	4
K Khachanov (Canada) D Shapovalov	7^{8}	6^{12}	[10]
(India) R Bopanna (Netherlands) M Middelkoop	6^{6}	7^{14}	[6]
(United Kingdom) J Murray (Brazil) B Soares	4	6	[10]
8	(Colombia) JS Cabal (Colombia) R Farah	6	2	[7]
Alt	(Spain) R Bautista Agut (Brazil) M Melo	4	6^{4}
PR	(Mexico) S González (France) É Roger-Vasselin	6	7^{7}
(Germany) K Krawietz (Germany) A Mies	6	7^{7}
(Poland) H Hurkacz (United States) J Isner	4	6^{0}
(Australia) A de Minaur (United Kingdom) C Norrie	7^{7}	7^{8}
7	(Croatia) I Dodig (United States) A Krajicek	6^{2}	6^{6}

Second round
1	(United States) R Ram (United Kingdom) J Salisbury	6^{3}	6	[10]
(Australia) T Kokkinakis (Australia) N Kyrgios	7^{7}	2	[8]
K Khachanov (Canada) D Shapovalov	7^{10}	3	[10]
(United Kingdom) J Murray (Brazil) B Soares	6^{8}	6	[3]
3	(Netherlands) W Koolhof (United Kingdom) N Skupski	3	4
PR	(Mexico) S González (France) É Roger-Vasselin	6	6
(Germany) K Krawietz (Germany) A Mies	4	6	[11]
(Australia) A de Minaur (United Kingdom) C Norrie	6	3	[9]

Quarterfinals
1	(United States) R Ram (United Kingdom) J Salisbury	6	7^{8}
K Khachanov (Canada) D Shapovalov	1	6^{6}
PR	(Mexico) S González (France) É Roger-Vasselin	6	6^{2}	[10]
(Germany) K Krawietz (Germany) A Mies	3	7^{7}	[6]

Semifinals
1	(United States) R Ram (United Kingdom) J Salisbury	6	7
PR	(Mexico) S González (France) É Roger-Vasselin	4	5

=== Bottom half ===
First round
5	(Croatia) N Mektić (Croatia) M Pavić	6	6
PR	(Poland) Ł Kubot (Switzerland) S Wawrinka	3	4
WC	(Denmark) H Rune (Greece) S Tsitsipas	6	6
(Brazil) R Matos (Spain) D Vega Hernández	2	3
WC	(United States) W Blumberg (United States) S Johnson	7	3	[10]
(Australia) M Ebden (Australia) M Purcell	5	6	[6]
6	(Germany) T Pütz (New Zealand) M Venus	6	6
(Argentina) F Cerúndolo (Argentina) D Schwartzman	2	1
(United Kingdom) L Glasspool (Finland) H Heliövaara	4	6	[10]
WC	(United States) T Paul (United States) F Tiafoe	6	3	[8]
(Bulgaria) G Dimitrov; A Rublev	7^{7}	7
(United Kingdom) D Evans (Australia) J Peers	6^{5}	5

Second round
5	(Croatia) N Mektić (Croatia) M Pavić	7^{7}	3	[7]
WC	(Denmark) H Rune (Greece) S Tsitsipas	6^{5}	6	[10]
WC	(United States) W Blumberg (United States) S Johnson	3	6^{11}
4	(El Salvador) M Arévalo (Netherlands) J-J Rojer	6	7^{13}
6	(Germany) T Pütz (New Zealand) M Venus	4	7^{7}	[10]
(United Kingdom) L Glasspool (Finland) H Heliövaara	6	6^{2}	[8]
(Bulgaria) G Dimitrov; A Rublev	3	3
2	(Spain) M Granollers (Argentina) H Zeballos	6	6

Quarterfinals
WC	(Denmark) H Rune (Greece) S Tsitsipas	7	4	[10]
4	(El Salvador) M Arévalo (Netherlands) J-J Rojer	5	6	[7]
6	(Germany) T Pütz (New Zealand) M Venus	6	6
2	(Spain) M Granollers (Argentina) H Zeballos	3	3

Semifinals
WC	(Denmark) H Rune (Greece) S Tsitsipas
6	(Germany) T Pütz (New Zealand) M Venus	w/o

== Seeded teams ==
The following are the seeded teams, based on ATP rankings as of August 8, 2022.

Country	Player	Country	Player	Rank	Seed
USA	Rajeev Ram	GBR	Joe Salisbury	3	1
ESP	Marcel Granollers	ARG	Horacio Zeballos	9	2
NED	Wesley Koolhof	GBR	Neal Skupski	9	3
ESA	Marcelo Arévalo	NED	Jean-Julien Rojer	16	4
CRO	Nikola Mektić	CRO	Mate Pavić	18	5
GER	Tim Pütz	NZL	Michael Venus	23	6
CRO	Ivan Dodig	USA	Austin Krajicek	30	7
COL	Juan Sebastián Cabal	COL	Robert Farah	40	8

== Other entry information ==
=== Wild cards ===
- (United States) William Blumberg / (United States) Steve Johnson
- (United States) Tommy Paul / (United States) Frances Tiafoe
- (Denmark) Holger Rune / (Greece) Stefanos Tsitsipas

=== Protected ranking ===
- (Mexico) Santiago González / (France) Édouard Roger-Vasselin
- (Poland) Łukasz Kubot / (Switzerland) Stan Wawrinka

=== Alternates ===
- (Spain) Roberto Bautista Agut / (Brazil) Marcelo Melo

=== Withdrawals ===
- (Spain) Carlos Alcaraz / (Spain) Pablo Carreño Busta → replaced by (Spain) Roberto Bautista Agut / (Brazil) Marcelo Melo
