= BNP Paribas Tennis Classic =

Giorgio Armani Tennis Classic at Hurlingham

Exhibition
- Sponsor: Aspall Cyder (2017–19), Giorgio Armani (2022–present)
- Founded: 1994
- Editions: 25
- Location: London, United Kingdom
- Venue: The Hurlingham Club
- Category: Exhibition
- Surface: Grass
- Website: Hurlingham Tennis Classic

The Giorgio Armani Tennis Classic at Hurlingham is an exhibition tennis tournament held each year since 1994 on the grass courts at the Hurlingham Club in London, in the week before the Wimbledon Championships. It is managed by MARI.

Previously Rafael Nadal, Novak Djokovic, Andy Murray, Stan Wawrinka, Kei Nishikori, Richard Gasquet and Carlos Alcaraz have appeared as well with a host of other players.
