= 2022 Mallorca Championships =

- Date: 20–26 June
- Edition: 2nd
- Category: ATP Tour 250
- Draw: 28S / 16D
- Surface: Grass
- Location: Santa Ponsa, Spain
- Venue: Santa Ponsa Tennis Academy

Champions

Singles
- (Greece) Stefanos Tsitsipas

Doubles
- (Brazil) Rafael Matos / (Spain) David Vega Hernández
- Mallorca Championships

The 2022 Mallorca Championships was a men's tennis tournament to be played on outdoor grass courts. It was the second edition of the Mallorca Championships, and part of the ATP Tour 250 series of the 2022 ATP Tour. It was held at the Santa Ponsa Tennis Academy in Santa Ponsa, Spain, from 20 June until 26 June 2022.

== Champions ==
=== Singles ===
- (Greece) Stefanos Tsitsipas defeated (Spain) Roberto Bautista Agut, 6–4, 3–6, 7–6^{(7–2)}

=== Doubles ===
- (Brazil) Rafael Matos / (Spain) David Vega Hernández defeated (Uruguay) Ariel Behar / (Ecuador) Gonzalo Escobar, 7–6^{(7–5)}, 6–7^{(6–8)}, [10–1]

== Singles main draw entrants ==
=== Seeds ===
Country	Player	Rank^{1}	Seed
	Daniil Medvedev	1	1
GRE	Stefanos Tsitsipas	6	2
CAN	Denis Shapovalov	15	3
ESP	Pablo Carreño Busta	19	4
ESP	Roberto Bautista Agut	20	5
NED	Botic van de Zandschulp	29	6
SRB	Miomir Kecmanović	30	7
ARG	Sebastián Báez	34	8

- ^{1} Rankings are as of 13 June 2022.

=== Other entrants ===
The following players received wildcards into the main draw:

- (Spain) Feliciano López
- (Spain) Jaume Munar
- (Greece) Stefanos Tsitsipas

The following player received entry using a special exempt into the main draw:

- (Australia) Nick Kyrgios

The following players received entry from the qualifying draw:

- (Switzerland) Antoine Bellier
- (Japan) Taro Daniel
- (Chile) Alejandro Tabilo
- (Australia) Jordan Thompson

=== Withdrawals ===
- (South Africa) Lloyd Harris → replaced by (Finland) Emil Ruusuvuori
- (Poland) Hubert Hurkacz → replaced by (Serbia) Dušan Lajović
- (United States) John Isner → replaced by (United States) Mackenzie McDonald
- (Germany) Oscar Otte → replaced by (Argentina) Federico Delbonis

== Doubles main draw entrants ==
=== Seeds ===
Country	Player	Country	Player	Rank^{1}	Seed
ESA	Marcelo Arévalo	NED	Jean-Julien Rojer	21	1
GER	Kevin Krawietz	GER	Andreas Mies	60	2
MEX	Santiago González	ARG	Andrés Molteni	68	3
KAZ	Andrey Golubev	ARG	Máximo González	74	4

- ^{1} Rankings are as of 13 June 2022.

=== Other entrants ===
The following pairs received wildcards into the doubles main draw:

- (Austria) Alexander Erler / (Austria) Lucas Miedler
- (Greece) Petros Tsitsipas / (Greece) Stefanos Tsitsipas

=== Withdrawals ===
Before the tournament

- (Belgium) Sander Gillé / (Belgium) Joran Vliegen → replaced by Aslan Karatsev / (Belgium) Joran Vliegen
- (Spain) Marcel Granollers / (Argentina) Horacio Zeballos → replaced by (Argentina) Sebastián Báez / (Portugal) João Sousa
- (France) Pierre-Hugues Herbert / (France) Albano Olivetti → replaced by (France) Fabrice Martin / (Monaco) Hugo Nys
