= 2022 Mutua Madrid Open =

- Date: 1 − 8 May (men); 28 April – 7 May (women)
- Edition: 20th (men); 13th (women)
- Category: ATP Tour Masters 1000 (men); WTA 1000 (women)
- Draw: 56S / 28D (men); 64S / 30D (women)
- Prize money: €6,744,165 (men) €6,575,560 (women)
- Surface: Clay / outdoor
- Location: Madrid, Spain
- Venue: Park Manzanares

Champions

Men's singles
- (Spain) Carlos Alcaraz

Women's singles
- (Tunisia) Ons Jabeur

Men's doubles
- (Netherlands) Wesley Koolhof / (United Kingdom) Neal Skupski

Women's doubles
- (Canada) Gabriela Dabrowski / (Mexico) Giuliana Olmos
- Madrid Open

The 2022 Mutua Madrid Open was a professional tennis tournament played on outdoor clay courts at the Park Manzanares in Madrid, Spain from 28 April to 8 May 2022. It was the 20th edition of the event on the ATP Tour and 13th on the WTA Tour. It was classified as an ATP Tour Masters 1000 event on the 2022 ATP Tour and a WTA 1000 event on the 2022 WTA Tour.

== Finals ==
=== Men's singles ===
- (Spain) Carlos Alcaraz def. (Germany) Alexander Zverev, 6–3, 6–1

=== Women's singles ===
- (Tunisia) Ons Jabeur def. (United States) Jessica Pegula, 7–5, 0–6, 6–2

This was Jabeur's second WTA Tour title, and first at WTA 1000 level.

=== Men's doubles ===
- (Netherlands) Wesley Koolhof / (United Kingdom) Neal Skupski def. (Colombia) Juan Sebastián Cabal / (Colombia) Robert Farah, 6–7^{(4–7)}, 6–4, [10–5]

This was the first career ATP Masters 1000 title for both players.

=== Women's doubles ===
- (Canada) Gabriela Dabrowski / (Mexico) Giuliana Olmos def. (United States) Desirae Krawczyk / (Netherlands) Demi Schuurs, 7–6^{(7–1)}, 5–7, [10–7]

== Points and Prize Money ==
=== Point distribution ===
Event	W	F	SF	QF	Round of 16	Round of 32	Round of 64	Q	Q2	Q1
Men's singles	1000	600	360	180	90	45	10	25	16	0
Men's doubles	1000	600	360	180	90	10	—N/a	—N/a	—N/a	—N/a
Women's singles	1000	650	390	215	120	65	10	30	20	2
Women's doubles	1000	650	390	215	120	10	—N/a	—N/a	—N/a	—N/a

=== Prize money ===
Event	W	F	SF	QF	Round of 16	Round of 32	Round of 64	Q2	Q1
Men's singles	€1,041,570	€568,790	€311,025	€169,650	€90,745	€48,655	€26,960	€13,810	€7,235
Women's singles	€1,041,570	€568,790	€311,025	€169,650	€90,745	€45,095	€22,000	€8,054	€4,220
Men's doubles*	€319,570	€173,600	€95,350	€52,510	€28,930	€15,780	—N/a	—N/a	—N/a
Women's doubles*	€319,570	€173,600	€95,350	€52,610	€28,930	€13,528	—N/a	—N/a	—N/a

_{*per team}
