= 2022 Western & Southern Open =

- Date: August 15–21
- Edition: 121st (men) / 94th (women)
- Category: ATP Tour Masters 1000 (men); WTA 1000 (women)
- Surface: Hard
- Location: Mason, Ohio, U.S.
- Venue: Lindner Family Tennis Center

Champions

Men's singles
- (Croatia) Borna Ćorić

Women's singles
- (France) Caroline Garcia

Men's doubles
- (United States) Rajeev Ram / (United Kingdom) Joe Salisbury

Women's doubles
- (Ukraine) Lyudmyla Kichenok / (Latvia) Jeļena Ostapenko
- Cincinnati Open

The 2022 Western & Southern Open was a men's and women's tennis tournament played on outdoor hard courts from August 15–21, 2022, as part of the US Open Series. It was a Masters 1000 tournament on the 2022 ATP Tour and a WTA 1000 tournament on the 2022 WTA Tour.

The 2022 tournament was the 121st men's edition and the 94th women's edition of the Cincinnati Open and took place at the Lindner Family Tennis Center in Mason, Ohio, a northern suburb of Cincinnati, in the United States.

== Points and prize money ==
=== Point distribution ===
Event	W	F	SF	QF	Round of 16	Round of 32	Round of 64	Q	Q2	Q1
Men's singles	1000	600	360	180	90	45	10	25	16	0
Men's doubles	1000	600	360	180	90	0	—N/a	—N/a	—N/a	—N/a
Women's singles	900	585	350	190	105	60	1	30	20	1
Women's doubles	900	585	350	190	105	5	—N/a	—N/a	—N/a	—N/a

=== Prize money ===
Event	W	F	SF	QF	Round of 16	Round of 32	Round of 64	Q2	Q1
Men's singles	$970,020	$529,710	$289,655	$157,995	$84,510	$45,315	$25,110	$12,860	$6,735
Women's singles	$412,000	$242,800	$125,000	$57,440	$28,730	$16,340	$11,725	$6,880	$3,580
Men's doubles*	$297,620	$161,670	$88,800	$48,990	$26,940	$14,700	—N/a	—N/a	—N/a
Women's doubles*	$120,300	$67,630	$37,180	$18,750	$10,620	$7,120	—N/a	—N/a	—N/a

_{*per team}

== Champions ==
=== Men's singles ===
- (Croatia) Borna Ćorić def. (Greece) Stefanos Tsitsipas, 7–6^{(7–0)}, 6–2

This was Ćorić's third ATP Tour singles title, and first of the year.

=== Women's singles ===
- (France) Caroline Garcia def. (Czech Republic) Petra Kvitová, 6–2, 6–4.

This was Garcia's 10th WTA Tour singles title, and third of the year. This was her third WTA 1000 title, and her first since 2017.

=== Men's doubles ===
- (United States) Rajeev Ram / (United Kingdom) Joe Salisbury def. (Germany) Tim Pütz / (New Zealand) Michael Venus, 7–6^{(7–4)}, 7–6^{(7–5)}

=== Women's doubles ===
- (Ukraine) Lyudmyla Kichenok / (Latvia) Jeļena Ostapenko def. (United States) Nicole Melichar-Martinez / (Australia) Ellen Perez, 7–6^{(7–5)}, 6–3
