= 2025 Almaty Open =

Tennis tournament in Kazakhstan

- Date: 13 – 19 October
- Edition: 6th
- Category: ATP 250
- Draw: 28S / 16D
- Surface: Hard (indoor)
- Location: Almaty, Kazakhstan
- Venue: Almaty Arena

Champions

Singles
- Daniil Medvedev

Doubles
- (France) Théo Arribagé / (France) Albano Olivetti
← 2024 ·	Almaty Open	· 2026 →

The 2025 Almaty Open was a professional men's tennis tournament held on indoor hardcourts. It was the sixth edition of the tournament and an ATP 250 event of the 2025 ATP Tour.

== Champions ==
=== Singles ===
- Daniil Medvedev def. (France) Corentin Moutet, 7–5, 4–6, 6–3

=== Doubles ===
- (France) Théo Arribagé / (France) Albano Olivetti def. (Germany) Jakob Schnaitter / (Germany) Mark Wallner, 6–4, 7–6^{(10–8)}

== Singles main draw entrants ==
=== Seeds ===
Country	Player	Rank^{1}	Seed
	Karen Khachanov	10	1
	Daniil Medvedev	18	2
ITA	Flavio Cobolli	22	3
ITA	Luciano Darderi	29	4
USA	Brandon Nakashima	32	5
USA	Alex Michelsen	34	6
CAN	Gabriel Diallo	35	7
FRA	Corentin Moutet	38	8

- Rankings are as of 29 September 2025.

=== Other entrants ===
The following players received wildcards into the singles main draw:

- (Kazakhstan) Amir Omarkhanov
- (Kazakhstan) Timofey Skatov
- (Kazakhstan) Beibit Zhukayev

The following players received entry from the qualifying draw:

- (France) Ugo Blanchet
- (Australia) James Duckworth
- (Australia) Bernard Tomic
- (Germany) Marko Topo

The following player received entry as a lucky loser:

- (Australia) Rinky Hijikata

=== Withdrawals ===
- (China) Bu Yunchaokete → replaced by (Australia) Rinky Hijikata
- (Kazakhstan) Alexander Bublik → replaced by (Australia) Aleksandar Vukic
- (Argentina) Mariano Navone → replaced by (Germany) Jan-Lennard Struff
- (Australia) Jordan Thompson → replaced by (Japan) Shintaro Mochizuki

== Doubles main draw entrants ==
=== Seeds ===
Country	Player	Country	Player	Rank^{1}	Seed
ARG	Guido Andreozzi	FRA	Manuel Guinard	76	1
GER	Constantin Frantzen	NED	Robin Haase	108	2
GER	Jakob Schnaitter	GER	Mark Wallner	118	3
FRA	Théo Arribagé	FRA	Albano Olivetti	122	4

- Rankings are as of 29 September 2025

=== Other entrants ===
The following pairs received wildcards into the doubles main draw:

- (Kazakhstan) Amir Omarkhanov / (Kazakhstan) Beibit Zhukayev
- (Kazakhstan) Alexander Shevchenko / (Kazakhstan) Timofey Skatov

=== Withdrawals ===
- (Italy) Luciano Darderi / (Italy) Luca Nardi → not replaced
