= 2024 Almaty Open – Singles =

Singles
- 2024 Almaty Open

Final
- Champion: Karen Khachanov
- Runner-up: (Canada) Gabriel Diallo
- Score: 6–2, 5–7, 6–3

Details
- Draw: 28 (4 Q / 3 WC)
- Seeds: 8

Events
Singles	Doubles
← 2023 ·	Almaty Open	· 2025 →

Karen Khachanov defeated Gabriel Diallo in the final, 6–2, 5–7, 6–3 to win the singles tennis title at the 2024 Almaty Open. It was his seventh ATP Tour singles title.

Adrian Mannarino was the defending champion from when the tournament was last held in Astana in 2023, but lost to Aleksandar Vukic in the second round.

Aged 17 years and 14 days old, Justin Engel became the youngest player to win an ATP Tour main draw singles match since Carlos Alcaraz at the 2020 Rio Open, as well as the first player born in 2007 to do so.

== Seeds ==
The top four seeds received a bye into the second round.

1. (United States) Frances Tiafoe (quarterfinals)
2. (Chile) Alejandro Tabilo (quarterfinals)
3. Karen Khachanov (champion)
4. (Argentina) Francisco Cerúndolo (semifinals)
5. (Czech Republic) Tomáš Macháč (second round, retired)
6. (China) Zhang Zhizhen (first round)
7. (Hungary) Fábián Marozsán (first round)
8. (France) Adrian Mannarino (second round)

== Draw ==
=== Key ===
- Q = Qualifier
- WC = Wild card
- LL = Lucky loser
- Alt = Alternate
- ITF = ITF entry
- PR = Protected ranking
- SR = Special ranking
- SE = Special exempt
- JE = Junior exempt
- JR = Junior Accelerator Programme entrant
- CO = College Accelerator Programme entrant
- NG = Next Gen Accelerator Program entrant
- w/o = Walkover
- r = Retired
- d = Defaulted

=== Finals ===
Semifinals
(Australia) Aleksandar Vukic	7^{7}	3	4
3	Karen Khachanov	6^{3}	6	6
4	(Argentina) Francisco Cerúndolo	4	2
(Canada) Gabriel Diallo	6	6

Final
3	Karen Khachanov	6	5	6
(Canada) Gabriel Diallo	2	7	3

=== Top half ===
First round
(Japan) T Daniel	2	6^{4}
Q	(United Kingdom) D Evans	6	7^{7}
(Australia) J Duckworth	4	5
(Australia) A Vukic	6	7
R Safiullin	7	6^{4}	3
8	(France) A Mannarino	5	7^{7}	6
(Finland) O Virtanen	6	7^{7}
(Italy) F Fognini	3	6^{4}
Q	(Lebanon) B Hassan	4	1
WC	(Kazakhstan) B Zhukayev	6	6
WC	(Kazakhstan) T Skatov	3	4
5	(Czech Republic) T Macháč	6	6

Second round
1	(United States) F Tiafoe	6^{10}	7^{7}	6
Q	(United Kingdom) D Evans	7^{12}	6^{4}	3
(Australia) A Vukic	7^{7}	6
8	(France) A Mannarino	6^{4}	3
3	K Khachanov	7^{7}	7^{7}
(Finland) O Virtanen	6^{2}	6^{3}
WC	(Kazakhstan) B Zhukayev	3
5	(Czech Republic) T Macháč	1^{r}

Quarterfinals
1	(United States) F Tiafoe	2	6^{11}
(Australia) A Vukic	6	7^{13}
3	K Khachanov	6	6
WC	(Kazakhstan) B Zhukayev	2	4

Semifinals
(Australia) A Vukic	7^{7}	3	4
3	K Khachanov	6^{3}	6	6

=== Bottom half ===
First round
6	(China) Z Zhang	4	6^{2}
Q	A Karatsev	6	7^{7}
(Kazakhstan) A Shevchenko	7^{7}	7^{7}
Q	(Kazakhstan) M Kukushkin	6^{5}	6^{4}
WC	(Germany) J Engel	7	6
(Hong Kong) C Wong	5	4
7	(Hungary) F Marozsán	4	6^{4}
(Croatia) B Ćorić	6	7^{7}
(Australia) C O'Connell	6^{5}	2
(Canada) G Diallo	7^{7}	6
(Bosnia and Herzegovina) D Džumhur	5	4
(Germany) M Marterer	7	6

Second round
Q	A Karatsev	1	7^{7}	5
(Kazakhstan) A Shevchenko	6	6^{5}	7
WC	(Germany) J Engel	4	6^{3}
4	(Argentina) F Cerúndolo	6	7^{7}
(Croatia) B Ćorić	6^{1}	4
(Canada) G Diallo	7^{7}	6
(Germany) M Marterer	2	4
2	(Chile) A Tabilo	6	6

Quarterfinals
(Kazakhstan) A Shevchenko	2	3
4	(Argentina) F Cerúndolo	6	6
(Canada) G Diallo	3	6	6
2	(Chile) A Tabilo	6	3	4

Semifinals
4	(Argentina) F Cerúndolo	4	2
(Canada) G Diallo	6	6

== Qualifying ==
=== Seeds ===
1. (China) Bu Yunchaokete (qualifying competition)
2. (Kazakhstan) Mikhail Kukushkin (qualified)
3. (Japan) Yasutaka Uchiyama (qualifying competition)
4. Aslan Karatsev (qualified)
5. (Spain) Alejandro Moro Cañas (qualifying competition)
6. (United Kingdom) Dan Evans (qualified)
7. (Kazakhstan) Denis Yevseyev (first round)
8. Alibek Kachmazov (qualifying competition)

=== Qualifiers ===
1. (United Kingdom) Dan Evans
2. (Kazakhstan) Mikhail Kukushkin
3. (Lebanon) Benjamin Hassan
4. Aslan Karatsev

=== Qualifying draw ===
==== First qualifier ====
First round
1	(China) Bu Yunchaokete	6	6
Alt	(Ukraine) Illya Marchenko	3	4
WC	(Kazakhstan) Amir Omarkhanov	4	2
6	(United Kingdom) Dan Evans	6	6

Qualifying competition
1	(China) Bu Yunchaokete	2	6	5
6	(United Kingdom) Dan Evans	6	3	7

==== Second qualifier ====
First round
2	(Kazakhstan) Mikhail Kukushkin	6	6
(Uzbekistan) Khumoyun Sultanov	4	4
(United States) Maxime Cressy	6	3	0^{r}
8	Alibek Kachmazov	4	6	2

Qualifying competition
2	(Kazakhstan) Mikhail Kukushkin	6	6
8	Alibek Kachmazov	1	2

==== Third qualifier ====
First round
3	(Japan) Yasutaka Uchiyama	7^{7}	6
(Turkey) Ergi Kırkın	6^{2}	3
(Lebanon) Benjamin Hassan	6	6
7	(Kazakhstan) Denis Yevseyev	2	4

Qualifying competition
3	(Japan) Yasutaka Uchiyama	2	2
(Lebanon) Benjamin Hassan	6	6

==== Fourth qualifier ====
First round
4	Aslan Karatsev	6	7
(Austria) Filip Misolic	2	5
WC	(Norway) Nicolai Budkov Kjær	1	3
5	(Spain) Alejandro Moro Cañas	6	6

Qualifying competition
4	Aslan Karatsev	6	6
5	(Spain) Alejandro Moro Cañas	4	3
