= 2023 Astana Open =

Tennis tournament in Kazakhstan

- Date: 27 September – 3 October
- Edition: 4th
- Category: ATP Tour 250
- Draw: 28S / 16D
- Prize money: $1,017,850
- Surface: Hard (indoor)
- Location: Astana, Kazakhstan
- Venue: Daulet National Tennis Centre

Champions

Singles
- (France) Adrian Mannarino

Doubles
- (United States) Nathaniel Lammons / (United States) Jackson Withrow
← 2022 ·	Astana Open	· 2024 →

The 2023 Astana Open was a professional men's tennis tournament to be held on indoor hard courts. It was the fourth edition of the Astana Open and part of the ATP Tour 250 Series of the 2023 ATP Tour (downgraded from ATP Tour 500 status in 2022).

== Champions ==
=== Singles ===
- (France) Adrian Mannarino def. (United States) Sebastian Korda, 4–6, 6–3, 6–2

=== Doubles ===
- (United States) Nathaniel Lammons / (United States) Jackson Withrow def. (Croatia) Mate Pavić / (Australia) John Peers, 7–6^{(7–4)}, 7–6^{(9–7)}

== Singles main draw entrants ==
=== Seeds ===
Country	Player	Rank^{1}	Seed
NED	Tallon Griekspoor	24	1
KAZ	Alexander Bublik	28	2
ARG	Sebastián Báez	29	3
CZE	Jiří Lehečka	30	4
USA	Sebastian Korda	33	5
FRA	Adrian Mannarino	34	6
SRB	Laslo Djere	37	7
SUI	Stan Wawrinka	40	8

- Rankings are as of 18 September 2023.

=== Other entrants ===
The following players received wildcards into the singles main draw:

- (Kazakhstan) Mikhail Kukushkin
- (Serbia) Hamad Medjedovic
- Alexander Shevchenko

The following players received entry from the qualifying draw:

- Egor Gerasimov
- Alibek Kachmazov
- (Austria) Jurij Rodionov
- (Japan) Sho Shimabukuro

=== Withdrawals ===
- (Croatia) Borna Ćorić → replaced by (Spain) Bernabé Zapata Miralles

== Doubles main draw entrants ==
=== Seeds ===
Country	Player	Country	Player	Rank^{1}	Seed
GBR	Jamie Murray	NZL	Michael Venus	50	1
USA	Nathaniel Lammons	USA	Jackson Withrow	55	2
GBR	Lloyd Glasspool	FIN	Harri Heliövaara	61	3
CRO	Mate Pavić	AUS	John Peers	61	4

- Rankings are as of 18 September 2023

=== Other entrants ===
The following pairs received wildcards into the doubles main draw:

- (Kazakhstan) Alexander Bublik / Daniil Golubev
- Egor Gerasimov / (Kazakhstan) Mikhail Kukushkin

=== Withdrawals ===
- (Brazil) Marcelo Demoliner / (Netherlands) Matwé Middelkoop → replaced by (Uruguay) Ariel Behar / (Czech Republic) Adam Pavlásek
