= 2021 Astana Open – Doubles =

2021 Astana Open – Doubles may refer to:

- 2021 Astana Open – Men's doubles
- 2021 Astana Open – Women's doubles
