= 2021 Astana Open – Singles =

2021 Astana Open – Singles may refer to:

- 2021 Astana Open – Men's singles
- 2021 Astana Open – Women's singles
