= 2025 Almaty Open – Doubles =

Doubles
- 2025 Almaty Open

Final
- Champions: (France) Théo Arribagé (France) Albano Olivetti
- Runners-up: (Germany) Jakob Schnaitter (Germany) Mark Wallner
- Score: 6–4, 7–6^{(10–8)}

Events
Singles	Doubles
- Almaty Open

Théo Arribagé and Albano Olivetti defeated Jakob Schnaitter and Mark Wallner in the final, 6–4, 7–6^{(10–8)} to win the doubles tennis title at the 2025 Almaty Open.

Rithvik Choudary Bollipalli and Arjun Kadhe were the defending champions, but lost in the first round to Schnaitter and Wallner.

== Seeds ==
1. (Argentina) Guido Andreozzi / (France) Manuel Guinard (quarterfinals)
2. (Germany) Constantin Frantzen / (Netherlands) Robin Haase (semifinals)
3. (Germany) Jakob Schnaitter / (Germany) Mark Wallner (final)
4. (France) Théo Arribagé / (France) Albano Olivetti (champions)

== Draw ==
Key

- Q = Qualifier
- WC = Wild card
- LL = Lucky loser
- Alt = Alternate
- ITF = ITF entry
- PR = Protected ranking
- SR = Special ranking
- SE = Special exempt
- JE = Junior exempt
- JR = Junior Accelerator Programme entrant
- CO = College Accelerator Programme entrant
- NG = Next Gen Accelerator Program entrant
- w/o = Walkover
- r = Retired
- d = Defaulted

=== Draw ===
First round
1	(Argentina) G Andreozzi (France) M Guinard	6	6
WC	(Kazakhstan) A Shevchenko (Kazakhstan) T Skatov	2	3
(Australia) MC Romios (United States) R Seggerman	6	6
(Colombia) N Barrientos (Chile) N Jarry	2	2
3	(Germany) J Schnaitter (Germany) M Wallner	6^{2}	7^{13}	[10]
PR	(India) RC Bollipalli (India) A Kadhe	7^{7}	6^{11}	[6]
WC	(Kazakhstan) A Omarkhanov (Kazakhstan) B Zhukayev	5	7^{7}	[8]
(Australia) J Duckworth (Australia) A Walton	7	6^{4}	[10]
(Ecuador) D Hidalgo (United States) P Trhac	6^{4}	6	[10]
(United Kingdom) J Paris (Japan) T Yuzuki	7^{7}	4	[8]
(India) S Balaji (India) VS Prashanth	4	6	[9]
4	(France) T Arribagé (France) A Olivetti	6	3	[11]
(Australia) R Hijikata (United States) M Kiger	3	4
2	(Germany) C Frantzen (Netherlands) R Haase	6	6

Quarterfinals
1	(Argentina) G Andreozzi (France) M Guinard	3	4
(Australia) MC Romios (United States) R Seggerman	6	6
3	(Germany) J Schnaitter (Germany) M Wallner	6	6
(Australia) J Duckworth (Australia) A Walton	2	3
(Ecuador) D Hidalgo (United States) P Trhac	6^{4}	3
4	(France) T Arribagé (France) A Olivetti	7^{7}	6
(Switzerland) J Paul (Czech Republic) M Vocel	3	6^{5}
2	(Germany) C Frantzen (Netherlands) R Haase	6	7^{7}

Semifinals
(Australia) MC Romios (United States) R Seggerman	4	5
3	(Germany) J Schnaitter (Germany) M Wallner	6	7
4	(France) T Arribagé (France) A Olivetti	7^{7}	7^{7}
2	(Germany) C Frantzen (Netherlands) R Haase	6^{4}	6^{2}

Final
3	(Germany) J Schnaitter (Germany) M Wallner	4	6^{8}
4	(France) T Arribagé (France) A Olivetti	6	7^{10}
