= 2026 Almaty Open – Singles =

Singles
- 2026 Almaty Open

Final
- Champion: Daniil Medvedev
- Runner-up: (Georgia (country)) Nikoloz Basilashvili
- Score: 6–7^{(6–8)}, 6–1, 6–3

Details
- Draw: 28 (4 Q / 3 WC)
- Seeds: 8

Events
| Singles | Doubles |
- Almaty Open

Defending champion Daniil Medvedev defeated Nikoloz Basilashvili in the final, 6–7^{(6–8)}, 6–1, 6–3 to win the singles tennis title at the 2026 Almaty Open. It was his 25th ATP Tour singles title and the first time Medvedev successfully defended a title. Basilashvili contested his first ATP Tour final since 2022.

== Seeds ==
The top four seeds received a bye into the second round.

1. Daniil Medvedev (champion)
2. (Italy) Luciano Darderi (second round)
3. (Kazakhstan) Alexander Bublik (semifinals, retired)
4. Andrey Rublev (second round)
5. Karen Khachanov (quarterfinals)
6. (Argentina) Tomás Martín Etcheverry (first round)
7. (Greece) Stefanos Tsitsipas (semifinals)
8. (Argentina) Thiago Agustín Tirante (first round)

== Draw ==
Key

- Q = Qualifier
- WC = Wild card
- LL = Lucky loser
- Alt = Alternate
- ITF = ITF entry
- PR = Protected ranking
- SR = Special ranking
- SE = Special exempt
- JE = Junior exempt
- JR = Junior Accelerator Programme entrant
- CO = College Accelerator Programme entrant
- NG = Next Gen Accelerator Program entrant
- w/o = Walkover
- r = Retired
- d = Defaulted

=== Finals ===
Semifinals
1 | Daniil Medvedev | 6 | 0
3 | (Kazakhstan) Alexander Bublik | 3 | 0^{r}
Q | (Georgia (country)) Nikoloz Basilashvili | 6 | 6^{5} | 6
7 | (Greece) Stefanos Tsitsipas | 4 | 7^{7} | 3

Final
1 | Daniil Medvedev | 6^{6} | 6 | 6
Q | (Georgia (country)) Nikoloz Basilashvili | 7^{8} | 1 | 3

=== Top half ===
First round
(Japan) S Shimabukuro | 6^{4} | 6 | 6
Q | R Safiullin | 7^{7} | 4 | 4
(France) T Atmane | 7^{7} | 6
(Australia) R Hijikata | 6^{5} | 2
(Italy) M Bellucci | 7^{7} | 2 | 6
6 | (Argentina) TM Etcheverry | 6^{5} | 6 | 4
(Hungary) F Marozsán | 7 | 7^{7}
WC | (Kazakhstan) T Skatov | 5 | 6^{4}
WC | (Kazakhstan) Z Nurlanuly | 2 | 0
(Czech Republic) T Macháč | 6 | 6
Q | (Japan) R Sakamoto | 2 | 4
5 | K Khachanov | 6 | 6

Second round
1 | D Medvedev | 6 | 6
(Japan) S Shimabukuro | 2 | 1
(France) T Atmane | 6^{4} | 7^{7} | 7^{7}
(Italy) M Bellucci | 7^{7} | 6^{2} | 6^{5}
3 | (Kazakhstan) A Bublik | w/o
(Hungary) F Marozsán
(Czech Republic) T Macháč | 2 | 6 | 6^{7}
5 | K Khachanov | 6 | 4 | 7^{9}

Quarterfinals
1 | D Medvedev | 6 | 6
(France) T Atmane | 4 | 4
3 | (Kazakhstan) A Bublik | 4 | 7^{7} | 7^{7}
5 | K Khachanov | 6 | 6^{5} | 6^{5}

Semifinals
1 | D Medvedev | 6 | 0
3 | (Kazakhstan) A Bublik | 3 | 0^{r}

=== Bottom half ===
First round
8 | (Argentina) TA Tirante | 7^{7} | 1 | 4
(Argentina) F Díaz Acosta | 6^{3} | 6 | 6
(Croatia) M Čilić | 2 | 5
Q | (Georgia (country)) N Basilashvili | 6 | 7
(France) A Mannarino | 7^{7} | 4 | 6
(Australia) A Vukic | 6^{4} | 6 | 3
7 | (Greece) S Tsitsipas | 7^{11} | 3 | 6
(United States) A Kovacevic | 6^{9} | 6 | 3
WC | (Kazakhstan) M Kukushkin | 7^{7} | 7^{7}
Q | (Greece) S Sakellaridis | 6^{4} | 6^{3}
(Serbia) M Kecmanović | 4 | 3
(Australia) J Duckworth | 6 | 6

Second round
(Argentina) F Díaz Acosta | 2 | 4
Q | (Georgia (country)) N Basilashvili | 6 | 6
(France) A Mannarino | 6 | 3 | 6
4 | A Rublev | 4 | 6 | 3
7 | (Greece) S Tsitsipas | 6 | 6
WC | (Kazakhstan) M Kukushkin | 1 | 2
(Australia) J Duckworth | 7 | 7^{9}
2 | (Italy) L Darderi | 5 | 6^{7}

Quarterfinals
Q | (Georgia (country)) N Basilashvili | 6 | 6
(France) A Mannarino | 3 | 1
7 | (Greece) S Tsitsipas | 6 | 6
(Australia) J Duckworth | 3 | 4

Semifinals
Q | (Georgia (country)) N Basilashvili | 6 | 6^{5} | 6
7 | (Greece) S Tsitsipas | 4 | 7^{7} | 3

== Qualifying ==
=== Seeds ===
1. Roman Safiullin (qualified)
2. (Australia) Adam Walton (qualifying competition)
3. (Kazakhstan) Alexander Shevchenko (qualifying competition)
4. (Canada) Gabriel Diallo (qualifying competition)
5. (Georgia (country)) Nikoloz Basilashvili (qualified)
6. (Greece) Stefanos Sakellaridis (qualified)
7. (Japan) Rei Sakamoto (qualified)
8. Ilia Simakin (qualifying competition)

=== Qualifiers ===
1. Roman Safiullin
2. (Georgia (country)) Nikoloz Basilashvili
3. (Greece) Stefanos Sakellaridis
4. (Japan) Rei Sakamoto

=== Qualifying draw ===
==== First qualifier ====
First round
1 | Roman Safiullin | 6 | 6^{4} | 6
Ilya Ivashka | 1 | 7^{7} | 4
(France) Luka Pavlovic | 3 | 6 | 6^{6}
8 | Ilia Simakin | 6 | 3 | 7^{8}

Qualifying competition
1 | Roman Safiullin | 7^{7} | 6
8 | Ilia Simakin | 6^{2} | 1

==== Second qualifier ====
First round
2 | (Australia) Adam Walton | 6 | 7
WC | (Kazakhstan) Beibit Zhukayev | 1 | 5
(Japan) Taro Daniel | 2 | 5
5 | (Georgia (country)) Nikoloz Basilashvili | 6 | 7

Qualifying competition
2 | (Australia) Adam Walton | 4 | 6^{4}
5 | (Georgia (country)) Nikoloz Basilashvili | 6 | 7^{7}

==== Third qualifier ====
First round
3 | (Kazakhstan) Alexander Shevchenko | 6 | 6^{3} | 7
(Estonia) Daniil Glinka | 3 | 7^{7} | 5
Petr Bar Biryukov | 2 | 3
6 | (Greece) Stefanos Sakellaridis | 6 | 6

Qualifying competition
3 | (Kazakhstan) Alexander Shevchenko | 6^{4} | 4
6 | (Greece) Stefanos Sakellaridis | 7^{7} | 6

==== Fourth qualifier ====
First round
4 | (Canada) Gabriel Diallo | 7^{7} | 6
(France) Harold Mayot | 6^{5} | 2
WC | (Kazakhstan) Amir Omarkhanov | 2 | 1
7 | (Japan) Rei Sakamoto | 6 | 6

Qualifying competition
4 | (Canada) Gabriel Diallo | 6 | 4 | 4
7 | (Japan) Rei Sakamoto | 2 | 6 | 6
