= 2021 Astana Open =

Tennis tournament in Kazakhstan

- Date: 20 September – 26 September (ATP); 27 September – 2 October (WTA)
- Edition: 2nd (ATP); 1st (WTA)
- Category: ATP Tour 250; WTA 250
- Prize money: $541,800 (ATP) $235,238 (WTA)
- Surface: Hard (indoor)
- Location: Nur-Sultan, Kazakhstan
- Venue: Daulet National Tennis Centre

Champions

Men's singles
- (South Korea) Kwon Soon-woo

Women's singles
- (Belgium) Alison Van Uytvanck

Men's doubles
- (Mexico) Santiago González / (Argentina) Andrés Molteni

Women's doubles
- (Germany) Anna-Lena Friedsam / (Romania) Monica Niculescu
← 2020 ·	Astana Open	· 2022 →

The 2021 Astana Open was a tennis tournament organized for professional tennis players, held in Nur-Sultan, Kazakhstan, in 2021 on indoor hard courts. It was primarily organized due to the cancellation of many tournaments during the 2021 ATP Tour and 2021 WTA Tour, because of the ongoing COVID-19 pandemic. It is the second edition of the tournament for the men and the first for the women. The tournament took place in Nur-Sultan, Kazakhstan, from 20–26 September for the men, and from 27 September to 2 October for the women.

== Champions ==
=== Men's singles ===
- (South Korea) Kwon Soon-woo def. (Australia) James Duckworth, 7–6^{(8–6)}, 6–3

This was Kwon's first ever career ATP title.

=== Women's singles ===
- (Belgium) Alison Van Uytvanck def. (Kazakhstan) Yulia Putintseva, 1–6, 6–4, 6–3.

This was Van Uytvanck's fifth singles title, and first of the year.

=== Men's doubles ===
- (Mexico) Santiago González / (Argentina) Andrés Molteni def. (Israel) Jonathan Erlich / (Belarus) Andrei Vasilevski, 6–1, 6–2

=== Women's doubles ===
- (Germany) Anna-Lena Friedsam / (Romania) Monica Niculescu def. (Russia) Angelina Gabueva / (Russia) Anastasia Zakharova 6–2, 4–6, [10–5]

== ATP singles main draw entrants ==
=== Seeds ===
Country	Player	Rank^{1}	Seed
RUS	Aslan Karatsev	25	1
KAZ	Alexander Bublik	34	2
SRB	Dušan Lajović	36	3
SRB	Filip Krajinović	37	4
AUS	John Millman	43	5
FRA	Benoît Paire	48	6
SRB	Laslo Đere	50	7
BLR	Ilya Ivashka	53	8

- Rankings are as of September 13, 2021.

=== Other entrants ===
The following players received wildcards into the singles main draw:

- (Kazakhstan) Mikhail Kukushkin
- (Kazakhstan) Timofey Skatov
- (Spain) Fernando Verdasco

The following players received entry from the qualifying draw:

- (Russia) Evgeny Donskoy
- (Australia) Marc Polmans
- (Kazakhstan) Dmitry Popko
- (Sweden) Elias Ymer

=== Withdrawals ===
Before the tournament

- (Chile) Cristian Garín → replaced by (Lithuania) Ričardas Berankis
- (France) Adrian Mannarino → replaced by (Colombia) Daniel Elahi Galán
- (United States) Mackenzie McDonald → replaced by (Spain) Carlos Taberner

== ATP doubles main draw entrants ==
=== Seeds ===
Country	Player	Country	Player	Rank^{1}	Seed
MEX	Santiago González	ARG	Andrés Molteni	112	1
KAZ	Andrey Golubev	KAZ	Aleksandr Nedovyesov	117	2
BRA	Marcelo Demoliner	BRA	Rafael Matos	126	3
SWE	André Göransson	ITA	Andrea Vavassori	143	4

- Rankings are as of September 13, 2021

=== Other entrants ===
The following pairs received wildcards into the doubles main draw:

- (Kazakhstan) Alexander Bublik / (Russia) Daniil Golubev
- (Kazakhstan) Dmitry Popko / (Kazakhstan) Timofey Skatov

=== Withdrawals ===
Before the tournament

- (United States) Nathaniel Lammons / (United States) Mackenzie McDonald → replaced by (Germany) Andre Begemann / (United States) Nathaniel Lammons

== WTA singles main draw entrants ==
=== Seeds ===
Country	Player	Rank^{1}	Seed
KAZ	Yulia Putintseva	49	1
BEL	Alison Van Uytvanck	55	2
FRA	Kristina Mladenovic	65	3
BEL	Greet Minnen	75	4
CRO	Ana Konjuh	77	5
SWE	Rebecca Peterson	78	6
RUS	Varvara Gracheva	82	7
FRA	Clara Burel	91	8

- Rankings are as of September 20, 2021.

=== Other entrants ===
The following players received wildcards into the singles main draw:

- (Kazakhstan) Anna Danilina
- (Kazakhstan) Zhibek Kulambayeva
- (Russia) Anastasia Potapova

The following players received entry using protected rankings:

- (Russia) Vitalia Diatchenko
- (Belarus) Vera Lapko
- (Luxembourg) Mandy Minella

The following players received entry from the qualifying draw:

- (United Kingdom) Katie Boulter
- (Belarus) Yuliya Hatouka
- (Serbia) Aleksandra Krunić
- (Ukraine) Lesia Tsurenko
- (Russia) Natalia Vikhlyantseva
- (Russia) Anastasia Zakharova

=== Withdrawals ===
Before the tournament

- (Romania) Irina-Camelia Begu → replaced by (Georgia (country)) Ekaterine Gorgodze
- (Slovenia) Polona Hercog → replaced by (Romania) Jaqueline Cristian
- (Japan) Nao Hibino → replaced by (Russia) Vitalia Diatchenko
- (Ukraine) Anhelina Kalinina → replaced by (Switzerland) Stefanie Vögele
- (Spain) Nuria Párrizas Díaz → replaced by (Luxembourg) Mandy Minella
- (Russia) Liudmila Samsonova → replaced by (Germany) Jule Niemeier
- (Slovakia) Anna Karolína Schmiedlová → replaced by (Czech Republic) Kristýna Plíšková
- (Serbia) Nina Stojanović → replaced by (Germany) Anna-Lena Friedsam
- (Denmark) Clara Tauson → replaced by (Netherlands) Lesley Pattinama Kerkhove
- (Russia) Vera Zvonareva → replaced by (Belarus) Vera Lapko

== WTA doubles main draw entrants ==
=== Seeds ===
Country	Player	Country	Player	Rank^{1}	Seed
BEL	Greet Minnen	BEL	Alison Van Uytvanck	138	1
RUS	Anna Blinkova	KAZ	Anna Danilina	149	2
GER	Anna-Lena Friedsam	ROU	Monica Niculescu	160	3
RUS	Varvara Gracheva	GEO	Oksana Kalashnikova	235	4

- Rankings are as of September 20, 2021

=== Other entrants ===
The following pairs received wildcards into the doubles main draw:

- (Kazakhstan) Gozal Ainitdinova / (Kazakhstan) Zhibek Kulambayeva
- (Kazakhstan) Sofiya Chursina / (Kazakhstan) Yekaterina Dmitrichenko

=== Withdrawals ===
Before the tournament

- (Russia) Natela Dzalamidze / (Russia) Kamilla Rakhimova → replaced by (Russia) Natela Dzalamidze / (Slovenia) Kaja Juvan
- (Germany) Vivian Heisen / (Belgium) Kimberley Zimmermann → replaced by (Russia) Vitalia Diatchenko / (Russia) Yana Sizikova
- (Georgia (country)) Oksana Kalashnikova / (Japan) Miyu Kato → replaced by (Russia) Varvara Gracheva / (Georgia (country)) Oksana Kalashnikova
- (Serbia) Aleksandra Krunić / (Serbia) Nina Stojanović → replaced by (India) Rutuja Bhosale / (United Kingdom) Emily Webley-Smith
