= 2026 Almaty Open – Doubles =

Doubles
- 2026 Almaty Open

Final
- Champions: (India) Yuki Bhambri (United States) Ryan Seggerman
- Runners-up: (Austria) Lucas Miedler (Austria) Neil Oberleitner
- Score: 7–6^{(7–3)}, 6–7^{(1–7)}, [10–2]
- Date: 25 October 2026

Events
Singles	Doubles
- Almaty Open

Yuki Bhambri and Ryan Seggerman defeated Lucas Miedler and Neil Oberleitner in the final, 7–6^{(7–3)}, 6–7^{(1–7)}, [10–2] to win the doubles tennis title at the 2026 Almaty Open.

Théo Arribagé and Albano Olivetti were the reigning champions, but chose to compete in Lyon instead.

== Seeds ==
1. (Austria) Lucas Miedler / (Austria) Neil Oberleitner (final)
2. (Germany) Jakob Schnaitter / (Germany) Mark Wallner (first round)
3. (India) Sriram Balaji / (United States) Evan King (semifinals)
4. (India) Yuki Bhambri / (United States) Ryan Seggerman (champions)

== Draw ==
Key

- Q = Qualifier
- WC = Wild card
- LL = Lucky loser
- Alt = Alternate
- ITF = ITF entry
- PR = Protected ranking
- SR = Special ranking
- SE = Special exempt
- JE = Junior exempt
- JR = Junior Accelerator Programme entrant
- CO = College Accelerator Programme entrant
- NG = Next Gen Accelerator Program entrant
- w/o = Walkover
- r = Retired
- d = Defaulted

=== Draw ===
First round
1	(Austria) L Miedler (Austria) N Oberleitner	7^{8}	7^{7}
WC	(Kazakhstan) A Omarkhanov (Kazakhstan) B Zhukayev	6^{6}	6^{4}
Alt	(Israel) D Cukierman (Brazil) F Romboli	3	7^{7}	[10]
WC	(Kazakhstan) A Bublik (Kazakhstan) Z Nurlanuly	6	6^{5}	[6]
3	(India) S Balaji (United States) E King	6	7^{7}
(India) A Chandrasekar (Chinese Taipei) R Ho	4	6^{4}
(Netherlands) J-J Rojer (United States) T Winegar	7^{7}	7^{7}
(Argentina) F Díaz Acosta (Argentina) TA Tirante	6^{3}	6^{1}
(Bulgaria) A Donski (Poland) F Pieczonka	6	6
(France) A Reymond (France) L Sanchez	2	1
(Belgium) S Gillé (Netherlands) S Verbeek	5	6^{5}
4	(India) Y Bhambri (United States) R Seggerman	7	7^{7}
(Italy) L Darderi (Argentina) TM Etcheverry	6	6^{8}	[5]
(Australia) J Kubler (Australia) J Peers	4	7^{10}	[10]
(United States) N Lammons (United States) J Withrow	6	6^{6}	[10]
2	(Germany) J Schnaitter (Germany) M Wallner	1	7^{8}	[7]

Quarterfinals
1	(Austria) L Miedler (Austria) N Oberleitner	6	7^{7}
Alt	(Israel) D Cukierman (Brazil) F Romboli	4	6^{4}
3	(India) S Balaji (United States) E King	6	5	[10]
(Netherlands) J-J Rojer (United States) T Winegar	4	7	[6]
(Bulgaria) A Donski (Poland) F Pieczonka	6^{6}	6^{2}
4	(India) Y Bhambri (United States) R Seggerman	7^{8}	7^{7}
(Australia) J Kubler (Australia) J Peers	6^{1}	6^{3}
(United States) N Lammons (United States) J Withrow	7^{7}	7^{7}

Semifinals
1	(Austria) L Miedler (Austria) N Oberleitner	7^{7}	4	[10]
3	(India) S Balaji (United States) E King	6^{4}	6	[3]
4	(India) Y Bhambri (United States) R Seggerman	3	7^{7}	[10]
(United States) N Lammons (United States) J Withrow	6	6^{5}	[6]

Final
1	(Austria) L Miedler (Austria) N Oberleitner	6^{3}	7^{7}	[2]
4	(India) Y Bhambri (United States) R Seggerman	7^{7}	6^{1}	[10]
