= 2023 Astana Open – Singles =

Singles
- 2023 Astana Open

Final
- Champion: (France) Adrian Mannarino
- Runner-up: (United States) Sebastian Korda
- Score: 4–6, 6–3, 6–2

Details
- Draw: 28
- Seeds: 8

Events
Singles	Doubles
← 2022 ·	Astana Open	· 2024 →

Adrian Mannarino defeated Sebastian Korda in the final, 4–6, 6–3, 6–2 to win the singles tennis title at the 2023 Astana Open. Mannarino won his second ATP Tour title of the season. Korda was contending for his first ATP Tour hardcourt title, but suffered a fifth loss in a tour-level hardcourt final.

Novak Djokovic was the reigning champion, but chose not to compete this year.

== Seeds ==
The top four seeds received a bye into the second round.

1. (Netherlands) Tallon Griekspoor (quarterfinals)
2. (Argentina) Sebastián Báez (second round)
3. (Kazakhstan) Alexander Bublik (second round)
4. (Czech Republic) Jiří Lehečka (quarterfinals)
5. (United States) Sebastian Korda (final)
6. (France) Adrian Mannarino (champion)
7. (Serbia) Laslo Djere (first round, retired)
8. (Switzerland) Stan Wawrinka (first round)

== Draw ==
Key

- Q = Qualifier
- WC = Wild card
- LL = Lucky loser
- Alt = Alternate
- ITF = ITF entry
- PR = Protected ranking
- SR = Special ranking
- SE = Special exempt
- JE = Junior exempt
- JR = Junior Accelerator Programme entrant
- CO = College Accelerator Programme entrant
- NG = Next Gen Accelerator Program entrant
- w/o = Walkover
- r = Retired
- d = Defaulted

=== Finals ===
Semifinals
5	(United States) Sebastian Korda	6^{8}	7^{7}	7^{7}
WC	(Serbia) Hamad Medjedovic	7^{10}	6^{2}	6^{3}
(Austria) Sebastian Ofner	4	2
6	(France) Adrian Mannarino	6	6

Final
5	(United States) Sebastian Korda	6	3	2
6	(France) Adrian Mannarino	4	6	6

=== Top half ===
First round
Q	(Japan) S Shimabukuro	6	6
(Spain) R Carballés Baena	2	4
WC	(Kazakhstan) M Kukushkin	7	6^{6}	4
(Portugal) N Borges	5	7^{8}	6
(Australia) A Popyrin	6^{5}	7^{7}	4
5	(United States) S Korda	7^{7}	6^{4}	6
Q	E Gerasimov	7^{7}	6
(Spain) B Zapata Miralles	6^{5}	3
WC	A Shevchenko	6	6
(Netherlands) B van de Zandschulp	4	3
WC	(Serbia) H Medjedovic	6	2
7	(Serbia) L Djere	3	1^{r}

Second round
1	(Netherlands) T Griekspoor	7^{7}	6^{4}	6
Q	(Japan) S Shimabukuro	6^{5}	7^{7}	1
(Portugal) N Borges	4	6^{4}
5	(United States) S Korda	6	7^{7}
4	(Czech Republic) J Lehečka	6	7^{7}
Q	E Gerasimov	2	6^{3}
WC	A Shevchenko	4	4
WC	(Serbia) H Medjedovic	6	6

Quarterfinals
1	(Netherlands) T Griekspoor	4	6	3
5	(United States) S Korda	6	4	6
4	(Czech Republic) J Lehečka	3	4
WC	(Serbia) H Medjedovic	6	6

Semifinals
5	(United States) S Korda	6^{8}	7^{7}	7^{7}
WC	(Serbia) H Medjedovic	7^{10}	6^{2}	6^{3}

=== Bottom half ===
First round
8	(Switzerland) S Wawrinka	7^{8}	6^{4}	6^{6}
(United States) M Giron	6^{6}	7^{7}	7^{8}
(Peru) JP Varillas	3	6^{8}
(Austria) D Thiem	6	7^{10}
(Hungary) M Fucsovics	6	2	3
(Austria) S Ofner	2	6	6
6	(France) A Mannarino	7^{7}	6
(France) A Rinderknech	6^{4}	2
Q	A Kachmazov	6	7^{7}
(France) C Moutet	3	6^{5}
(France) G Barrère	6	4	6^{5}
Q	(Austria) J Rodionov	2	6	7^{7}

Second round
(United States) M Giron	3	6	6^{2}
(Austria) D Thiem	6	4	7^{7}
(Austria) S Ofner	6	6
3	(Kazakhstan) A Bublik	4	2
6	(France) A Mannarino	6	5	6
Q	A Kachmazov	2	7	3
Q	(Austria) J Rodionov	6	6
2	(Argentina) S Báez	2	4

Quarterfinals
(Austria) D Thiem	7	4	2
(Austria) S Ofner	5	6	6
6	(France) A Mannarino	6	7^{8}
Q	(Austria) J Rodionov	1	6^{6}

Semifinals
(Austria) S Ofner	4	2
6	(France) A Mannarino	6	6

== Qualifying ==
=== Seeds ===
1. (Croatia) Borna Gojo (withdrew)
2. (France) Alexandre Müller (qualifying competition)
3. (Hungary) Fábián Marozsán (first round)
4. (Japan) Taro Daniel (qualifying competition)
5. (Austria) Jurij Rodionov (qualified)
6. (Japan) Sho Shimabukuro (qualified)
7. (Bosnia and Herzegovina) Damir Džumhur (qualifying competition)
8. (Belgium) Zizou Bergs (first round)

=== Qualifiers ===
1. (Austria) Jurij Rodionov
2. Egor Gerasimov
3. Alibek Kachmazov
4. (Japan) Sho Shimabukuro

=== Qualifying draw ===
==== First qualifier ====
First round
Alt	(New Zealand) Rubin Statham	4	1
(Belgium) Kimmer Coppejans	6	0^{r}
Evgeny Donskoy	1	2
5	(Austria) Jurij Rodionov	6	6

Qualifying competition
Alt	(New Zealand) Rubin Statham	6^{7}	4
5	(Austria) Jurij Rodionov	7^{9}	6

==== Second qualifier ====
First round
2	(France) Alexandre Müller	6	6
WC	(Kazakhstan) Timur Maulenov	4	2
PR	Egor Gerasimov	6	6
8	(Belgium) Zizou Bergs	4	4

Qualifying competition
2	(France) Alexandre Müller	4	6^{3}
PR	Egor Gerasimov	6	7^{7}

==== Third qualifier ====
First round
3	(Hungary) Fábián Marozsán	2	4
Alt	Alibek Kachmazov	6	6
Alt	(Czech Republic) Dominik Palán	6^{5}	3
7	(Bosnia and Herzegovina) Damir Džumhur	7^{7}	6

Qualifying competition
Alt	Alibek Kachmazov	7^{7}	7^{10}
7	(Bosnia and Herzegovina) Damir Džumhur	6^{4}	6^{8}

==== Fourth qualifier ====
First round
4	(Japan) Taro Daniel	7	7^{7}
(Italy) Stefano Napolitano	5	6^{5}
WC	(Georgia (country)) Saba Purtseladze	0	6	2
6	(Japan) Sho Shimabukuro	6	2	6

Qualifying competition
4	(Japan) Taro Daniel	3	7^{9}	6^{6}
6	(Japan) Sho Shimabukuro	6	6^{7}	7^{8}
