= 2026 Almaty Open =

Tennis tournament in Kazakhstan

- Date: 19 – 25 October
- Edition: 7th
- Category: ATP 250
- Draw: 28S / 16D
- Surface: Hard (indoor)
- Location: Almaty, Kazakhstan
- Venue: Almaty Arena

Champions

Singles
- Daniil Medvedev

Doubles
- (India) Yuki Bhambri / (United States) Ryan Seggerman
- Almaty Open

The 2026 Almaty Open was a professional men's tennis tournament held on indoor hardcourts. It was the seventh edition of the tournament and an ATP 250 event of the 2026 ATP Tour.

== Champions ==
=== Singles ===
- Daniil Medvedev def. (Georgia (country)) Nikoloz Basilashvili, 6–7^{(6–8)}, 6–1, 6–3

=== Doubles ===
- (India) Yuki Bhambri / (United States) Ryan Seggerman def. (Austria) Lucas Miedler / (Austria) Neil Oberleitner, 7–6^{(7–3)}, 6–7^{(1–7)}, [10–2]

== Singles main draw entrants ==
=== Seeds ===
Country	Player	Rank^{1}	Seed
	Daniil Medvedev	6	1
ITA	Luciano Darderi	21	2
KAZ	Alexander Bublik	22	3
	Andrey Rublev	23	4
	Karen Khachanov	27	5
ARG	Tomás Martín Etcheverry	31	6
GRE	Stefanos Tsitsipas	43	7
ARG	Thiago Agustín Tirante	54	8

- Rankings are as of 5 October 2026.

=== Other entrants ===
The following players received wildcards into the singles main draw:

- (Kazakhstan) Mikhail Kukushkin
- (Kazakhstan) Zangar Nurlanuly
- (Kazakhstan) Timofey Skatov

The following players received entry from the qualifying draw:

- (Georgia (country)) Nikoloz Basilashvili
- Roman Safiullin
- (Japan) Rei Sakamoto
- (Greece) Stefanos Sakellaridis

=== Withdrawals ===
- (Chile) Alejandro Tabilo → replaced by (Japan) Sho Shimabukuro
- (Argentina) Camilo Ugo Carabelli → replaced by (Italy) Mattia Bellucci

== Doubles main draw entrants ==
=== Seeds ===
Country	Player	Country	Player	Rank^{1}	Seed
AUT	Lucas Miedler	AUT	Neil Oberleitner	65	1
GER	Jakob Schnaitter	GER	Mark Wallner	66	2
IND	Sriram Balaji	USA	Evan King	103	3
IND	Yuki Bhambri	USA	Ryan Seggerman	110	4

- Rankings are as of 5 October 2026

=== Other entrants ===
The following pairs received wildcards into the doubles main draw:

- (Kazakhstan) Alexander Bublik / (Kazakhstan) Zangar Nurlanuly
- (Kazakhstan) Amir Omarkhanov / (Kazakhstan) Beibit Zhukayev

The following pair received entry as alternates:

- (Israel) Daniel Cukierman / (Brazil) Fernando Romboli

=== Withdrawals ===
- (Australia) Rinky Hijikata / (Australia) Adam Walton → replaced by (Israel) Daniel Cukierman / (Brazil) Fernando Romboli
