= 2024 Almaty Open =

Tennis tournament in Kazakhstan

- Date: 14 – 20 October
- Edition: 5th
- Category: ATP Tour 250
- Draw: 28S / 16D
- Prize money: $1,036,700
- Surface: Hard (indoor)
- Location: Almaty, Kazakhstan
- Venue: Almaty Arena

Champions

Singles
- Karen Khachanov

Doubles
- (India) Rithvik Choudary Bollipalli / (India) Arjun Kadhe
- Almaty Open

The 2024 Almaty Open was a professional men's tennis tournament held on indoor hard courts. It was the fifth edition of the tournament (moved this year from Astana to Almaty), and part of the ATP Tour 250 Series of the 2024 ATP Tour.

== Champions ==
=== Singles ===
- Karen Khachanov def. (Canada) Gabriel Diallo 6–2, 5–7, 6–3

=== Doubles ===
- (India) Rithvik Choudary Bollipalli / (India) Arjun Kadhe def. (Colombia) Nicolás Barrientos / (Tunisia) Skander Mansouri 3–6, 7–6^{(7–3)}, [14–12]

== Singles main draw entrants ==
=== Seeds ===
Country	Player	Rank^{1}	Seed
USA	Frances Tiafoe	17	1
CHI	Alejandro Tabilo	23	2
	Karen Khachanov	25	3
ARG	Francisco Cerúndolo	31	4
CZE	Tomáš Macháč	33	5
CHN	Zhang Zhizhen	41	6
HUN	Fábián Marozsán	48	7
FRA	Adrian Mannarino	53	8

- Rankings are as of 30 September 2024.

=== Other entrants ===
The following players received wildcards into the singles main draw:

- (Germany) Justin Engel
- (Kazakhstan) Timofey Skatov
- (Kazakhstan) Beibit Zhukayev

The following player received a late entry into the singles main draw:

- (Argentina) Francisco Cerúndolo

The following player received entry under the ATP Next Gen programme for players aged under 20 and ranked in the top 250:

- (Hong Kong) Coleman Wong

The following players received entry from the qualifying draw:

- (United Kingdom) Dan Evans
- (Lebanon) Benjamin Hassan
- Aslan Karatsev
- (Kazakhstan) Mikhail Kukushkin

=== Withdrawals ===
- (Kazakhstan) Alexander Bublik → replaced by (Australia) Aleksandar Vukic
- (Italy) Flavio Cobolli → replaced by (Finland) Otto Virtanen
- (France) Arthur Fils → replaced by (Japan) Taro Daniel
- (United States) Sebastian Korda → replaced by (Germany) Maximilian Marterer

== Doubles main draw entrants ==
=== Seeds ===
Country	Player	Country	Player	Rank^{1}	Seed
USA	Nathaniel Lammons	USA	Jackson Withrow	40	1
FRA	Sadio Doumbia	FRA	Fabien Reboul	57	2
IND	Yuki Bhambri	FRA	Albano Olivetti	87	3
ARG	Guido Andreozzi	IND	Sriram Balaji	113	4

- Rankings are as of 30 September 2024

=== Other entrants ===
The following pairs received wildcards into the doubles main draw:

- (Kazakhstan) Alexander Shevchenko / (Kazakhstan) Timofey Skatov
- (Kazakhstan) Denis Yevseyev / (Kazakhstan) Beibit Zhukayev

The following pair received entry as alternates:

- Alibek Kachmazov / (Zimbabwe) Benjamin Lock

=== Withdrawals ===
- (China) Bu Yunchaokete / (Chinese Taipei) Tseng Chun-hsin → replaced by Alibek Kachmazov / (Zimbabwe) Benjamin Lock
