= 2025 Almaty Open – Singles =

Singles
- 2025 Almaty Open

Final
- Champion: Daniil Medvedev
- Runner-up: (France) Corentin Moutet
- Score: 7–5, 4–6, 6–3

Details
- Draw: 28 (4 Q / 3 WC)
- Seeds: 8

Events
Singles	Doubles
- Almaty Open

Daniil Medvedev defeated Corentin Moutet in the final, 7–5, 4–6, 6–3 to win the singles tennis title at the 2025 Almaty Open. It was his 21st ATP Tour title, and his first in over two years.

Karen Khachanov was the defending champion, but lost in the second round to Jan-Lennard Struff.

== Seeds ==
The top four seeds received a bye into the second round.

1. Karen Khachanov (second round)
2. Daniil Medvedev (champion)
3. (Italy) Flavio Cobolli (quarterfinals)
4. (Italy) Luciano Darderi (second round)
5. (United States) Brandon Nakashima (second round)
6. (United States) Alex Michelsen (semifinals)
7. (Canada) Gabriel Diallo (second round)
8. (France) Corentin Moutet (final)

== Draw ==
Key

- Q = Qualifier
- WC = Wild card
- LL = Lucky loser
- Alt = Alternate
- ITF = ITF entry
- PR = Protected ranking
- SR = Special ranking
- SE = Special exempt
- JE = Junior exempt
- JR = Junior Accelerator Programme entrant
- CO = College Accelerator Programme entrant
- NG = Next Gen Accelerator Program entrant
- w/o = Walkover
- r = Retired
- d = Defaulted

=== Finals ===
Semifinals
8	(France) Corentin Moutet	7	6
6	(United States) Alex Michelsen	5	4
Q	(Australia) James Duckworth	7^{10}	3	2
2	Daniil Medvedev	6^{8}	6	6

Final
8	(France) Corentin Moutet	5	6	3
2	Daniil Medvedev	7	4	6

=== Top half ===
First round
(Germany) J-L Struff	2	6	6
(United States) M McDonald	6	3	4
(Serbia) L Djere	6^{1}	6^{12}
(Kazakhstan) A Shevchenko	7^{7}	7^{14}
Q	(Australia) B Tomic	1	6^{9}
8	(France) C Moutet	6	7^{11}
(France) A Cazaux	4	4
(Japan) S Mochizuki	6	6
(Australia) A Vukic	6	3	6
Q	(Germany) M Topo	4	6	1
WC	(Kazakhstan) B Zhukayev	2	3
6	(United States) A Michelsen	6	6

Second round
1	K Khachanov	6	6^{5}	3
(Germany) J-L Struff	4	7^{7}	6
(Kazakhstan) A Shevchenko	5	3
8	(France) C Moutet	7	6
4	(Italy) L Darderi	3	3
(Japan) S Mochizuki	6	6
(Australia) A Vukic	3	2
6	(United States) A Michelsen	6	6

Quarterfinals
(Germany) J-L Struff	4	5
8	(France) C Moutet	6	7
(Japan) S Mochizuki	3	6	2
6	(United States) A Michelsen	6	3	6

Semifinals
8	(France) C Moutet	7	6
6	(United States) A Michelsen	5	4

=== Bottom half ===
First round
7	(Canada) G Diallo	6	6
WC	(Kazakhstan) A Omarkhanov	3	1
Q	(France) U Blanchet	3	4
Q	(Australia) J Duckworth	6	6
LL	(Australia) R Hijikata	7^{7}	2	6
WC	(Kazakhstan) T Skatov	6^{3}	6	3
5	(United States) B Nakashima	7^{7}	6
(Serbia) H Medjedovic	6^{5}	2
(Hungary) F Marozsán	7^{7}	6
(Italy) L Nardi	6^{3}	3
(Australia) T Schoolkate	6^{4}	7^{7}	2
(Australia) A Walton	7^{7}	6^{3}	6

Second round
7	(Canada) G Diallo	6^{3}	7^{7}	4
Q	(Australia) J Duckworth	7^{7}	6^{3}	6
LL	(Australia) R Hijikata	4	5
3	(Italy) F Cobolli	6	7
5	(United States) B Nakashima	6^{5}	1
(Hungary) F Marozsán	7^{7}	6
(Australia) A Walton	5	6^{0}
2	D Medvedev	7	7^{7}

Quarterfinals
Q	(Australia) J Duckworth	6	6
3	(Italy) F Cobolli	3	2
(Hungary) F Marozsán	5	2
2	D Medvedev	7	6

Semifinals
Q	(Australia) J Duckworth	7^{10}	3	2
2	D Medvedev	6^{8}	6	6

== Qualifying ==
=== Seeds ===
1. (Australia) James Duckworth (qualified)
2. (Australia) Rinky Hijikata (qualifying competition, lucky loser)
3. (Canada) Liam Draxl (first round)
4. (United Kingdom) Billy Harris (first round)
5. (France) Ugo Blanchet (qualified)
6. (Japan) Taro Daniel (first round)
7. (France) Titouan Droguet (qualifying competition)
8. (Australia) Bernard Tomic (qualified)

=== Qualifiers ===
1. (Australia) James Duckworth
2. (France) Ugo Blanchet
3. (Australia) Bernard Tomic
4. (Germany) Marko Topo

=== Lucky loser ===
1. (Australia) Rinky Hijikata

=== Qualifying draw ===
==== First qualifier ====
First round
1	(Australia) James Duckworth	6	1
(Georgia (country)) Saba Purtseladze	3	0^{r}
WC	(Kazakhstan) Mikhail Kukushkin	7^{7}	6
6	(Japan) Taro Daniel	6^{3}	1

Qualifying competition
1	(Australia) James Duckworth	6	4	7
WC	(Kazakhstan) Mikhail Kukushkin	4	6	5

==== Second qualifier ====
First round
2	(Australia) Rinky Hijikata	7^{7}	6
(Switzerland) Jakub Paul	6^{2}	3
Ilia Simakin	3	7^{10}	6^{5}
5	(France) Ugo Blanchet	6	6^{8}	7^{7}

Qualifying competition
2	(Australia) Rinky Hijikata	5	2
5	(France) Ugo Blanchet	7	6

==== Third qualifier ====
First round
3	(Canada) Liam Draxl	4	6	3
(Switzerland) Marc-Andrea Hüsler	6	3	6
WC	(Kazakhstan) Denis Yevseyev	6	1	4
8	(Australia) Bernard Tomic	4	6	6

Qualifying competition
(Switzerland) Marc-Andrea Hüsler	6	6^{3}	6^{6}
8	(Australia) Bernard Tomic	3	7^{7}	7^{8}

==== Fourth qualifier ====
First round
4	(United Kingdom) Billy Harris	6^{3}	4
(Germany) Marko Topo	7^{7}	6
(Denmark) August Holmgren	6^{1}	6^{1}
7	(France) Titouan Droguet	7^{7}	7^{7}

Qualifying competition
(Germany) Marko Topo	6	3	7^{7}
7	(France) Titouan Droguet	4	6	6^{5}
