= 2024 Almaty Open – Doubles =

Doubles
- 2024 Almaty Open

Final
- Champions: (India) Rithvik Choudary Bollipalli (India) Arjun Kadhe
- Runners-up: (Colombia) Nicolás Barrientos (Tunisia) Skander Mansouri
- Score: 3–6, 7–6^{(7–3)}, [14–12]

Events
Singles	Doubles
- Almaty Open

Rithvik Choudary Bollipalli and Arjun Kadhe defeated Nicolás Barrientos and Skander Mansouri in the final, 3–6, 7–6^{(7–3)}, [14–12] to win the doubles title at the 2024 Almaty Open. It was the first ATP Tour doubles title for both players, and they saved five championship points.

Nathaniel Lammons and Jackson Withrow were the defending champions, but lost in the quarterfinals to Barrientos and Mansouri.

== Seeds ==
1. (United States) Nathaniel Lammons / (United States) Jackson Withrow (quarterfinals)
2. (France) Sadio Doumbia / (France) Fabien Reboul (quarterfinals)
3. (India) Yuki Bhambri / (France) Albano Olivetti (first round)
4. (Argentina) Guido Andreozzi / (India) Sriram Balaji (semifinals)

== Draw ==
Key

- Q = Qualifier
- WC = Wild card
- LL = Lucky loser
- Alt = Alternate
- ITF = ITF entry
- PR = Protected ranking
- SR = Special ranking
- SE = Special exempt
- JE = Junior exempt
- JR = Junior Accelerator Programme entrant
- CO = College Accelerator Programme entrant
- NG = Next Gen Accelerator Program entrant
- w/o = Walkover
- r = Retired
- d = Defaulted

=== Draw ===
First round
1	(United States) N Lammons (United States) J Withrow	7^{7}	7
(Colombia) C Rodríguez (Australia) MC Romios	6^{2}	5
(Colombia) N Barrientos (Tunisia) S Mansouri	2	6	[10]
(Monaco) R Arneodo (France) T Arribagé	6	4	[6]
4	(Argentina) G Andreozzi (India) S Balaji	6	6
(Australia) J Duckworth (Australia) A Vukic	3	2
WC	(Kazakhstan) A Shevchenko (Kazakhstan) T Skatov	6	7^{7}
(United States) E King (United States) R Stalder	1	6^{5}
(Portugal) F Cabral (Mexico) MÁ Reyes-Varela	6	7^{7}
WC	(Kazakhstan) D Yevseyev (Kazakhstan) B Zhukayev	4	6^{3}
(Germany) J Schnaitter (Germany) M Wallner	6	6
3	(India) Y Bhambri (France) A Olivetti	4	4
(Italy) M Bortolotti (Finland) P Niklas-Salminen	4	6^{3}
(India) RC Bollipalli (India) A Kadhe	6	7^{7}
Alt	A Kachmazov (Zimbabwe) B Lock	4	6	[5]
2	(France) S Doumbia (France) F Reboul	6	4	[10]

Quarterfinals
1	(United States) N Lammons (United States) J Withrow	6	3	[17]
(Colombia) N Barrientos (Tunisia) S Mansouri	3	6	[19]
4	(Argentina) G Andreozzi (India) S Balaji	6	6
WC	(Kazakhstan) A Shevchenko (Kazakhstan) T Skatov	3	4
(Portugal) F Cabral (Mexico) MÁ Reyes-Varela	6	3	[4]
(Germany) J Schnaitter (Germany) M Wallner	4	6	[10]
(India) RC Bollipalli (India) A Kadhe	6	6
2	(France) S Doumbia (France) F Reboul	4	4

Semifinals
(Colombia) N Barrientos (Tunisia) S Mansouri	7	6
4	(Argentina) G Andreozzi (India) S Balaji	5	2
(Germany) J Schnaitter (Germany) M Wallner	6^{6}	3
(India) RC Bollipalli (India) A Kadhe	7^{8}	6

Final
(Colombia) N Barrientos (Tunisia) S Mansouri	6	6^{3}	[12]
(India) RC Bollipalli (India) A Kadhe	3	7^{7}	[14]
