= 2023 Astana Open – Doubles =

Doubles
- 2023 Astana Open

Final
- Champions: (United States) Nathaniel Lammons (United States) Jackson Withrow
- Runners-up: (Croatia) Mate Pavić (Australia) John Peers
- Score: 7–6^{(7–4)}, 7–6^{(9–7)}

Events
Singles	Doubles
- Astana Open

Nathaniel Lammons and Jackson Withrow defeated the defending champion Mate Pavić and his partner, John Peers, in the final, 7–6^{(7–4)}, 7–6^{(9–7)}, to win the doubles tennis title at the 2023 Astana Open. It was their fourth ATP Tour title of the season. Pavić and Peers were competing in their first event as a team.

Pavić and Nikola Mektić were the reigning champions, but Mektić chose to compete in Beijing instead.

== Seeds ==
1. (United Kingdom) Jamie Murray / (New Zealand) Michael Venus (first round)
2. (United States) Nathaniel Lammons / (United States) Jackson Withrow (champions)
3. (United Kingdom) Lloyd Glasspool / (Finland) Harri Heliövaara (first round)
4. (Croatia) Mate Pavić / (Australia) John Peers (final)

== Draw ==
Key

- Q = Qualifier
- WC = Wild card
- LL = Lucky loser
- Alt = Alternate
- ITF = ITF entry
- PR = Protected ranking
- SR = Special ranking
- SE = Special exempt
- JE = Junior exempt
- JR = Junior Accelerator Programme entrant
- CO = College Accelerator Programme entrant
- NG = Next Gen Accelerator Program entrant
- w/o = Walkover
- r = Retired
- d = Defaulted

=== Draw ===
First round
1	(United Kingdom) J Murray (New Zealand) M Venus	3	2
(Portugal) F Cabral (Brazil) R Matos	6	6
WC	E Gerasimov (Kazakhstan) M Kukushkin	3	2
(Netherlands) R Haase (Netherlands) B van de Zandschulp	6	6
4	(Croatia) M Pavić (Australia) J Peers	6	7^{7}
(Hungary) M Fucsovics (Czech Republic) J Lehečka	3	6^{2}
(Monaco) R Arneodo (Austria) S Weissborn	7^{14}	2
(France) S Doumbia (France) F Reboul	6^{12}	2^{r}
(Argentina) S Báez (Spain) B Zapata Miralles	3	2
(Ecuador) G Escobar (Kazakhstan) A Nedovyesov	6	6
(Uruguay) A Behar (Czech Republic) A Pavlásek	7^{14}	4	[10]
3	(United Kingdom) L Glasspool (Finland) H Heliövaara	6^{12}	6	[7]
WC	(Kazakhstan) A Bublik; D Golubev	2	2
(France) G Barrère (France) A Mannarino	6	6
(Netherlands) T Griekspoor (Netherlands) B Stevens	4	5
2	(United States) N Lammons (United States) J Withrow	6	7

Quarterfinals
(Portugal) F Cabral (Brazil) R Matos	1	4
(Netherlands) R Haase (Netherlands) B van de Zandschulp	6	6
4	(Croatia) M Pavić (Australia) J Peers	7^{7}	6
(Monaco) R Arneodo (Austria) S Weissborn	6^{5}	4
(Ecuador) G Escobar (Kazakhstan) A Nedovyesov	3	6	[5]
(Uruguay) A Behar (Czech Republic) A Pavlásek	6	4	[10]
(France) G Barrère (France) A Mannarino
2	(United States) N Lammons (United States) J Withrow	w/o

Semifinals
(Netherlands) R Haase (Netherlands) B van de Zandschulp	2	1
4	(Croatia) M Pavić (Australia) J Peers	6	6
(Uruguay) A Behar (Czech Republic) A Pavlásek	3	6	[4]
2	(United States) N Lammons (United States) J Withrow	6	2	[10]

Final
4	(Croatia) M Pavić (Australia) J Peers	6^{4}	6^{7}
2	(United States) N Lammons (United States) J Withrow	7^{7}	7^{9}
