= 2021 Astana Open – Women's singles =

Women's singles
- 2021 Astana Open

Final
- Champion: (Belgium) Alison Van Uytvanck
- Runner-up: (Kazakhstan) Yulia Putintseva
- Score: 1–6, 6–4, 6–3

Details
- Draw: 32
- Seeds: 8

Events
Singles	men	women
Doubles	men	women
- Astana Open

This was the first edition of the women's event.

Alison Van Uytvanck won the title, defeating Yulia Putintseva in the final, 1–6, 6–4, 6–3.

== Seeds ==
1. (Kazakhstan) Yulia Putintseva (final)
2. (Belgium) Alison Van Uytvanck (champion)
3. (France) Kristina Mladenovic (second round)
4. (Belgium) Greet Minnen (first round)
5. (Croatia) Ana Konjuh (second round)
6. (Sweden) Rebecca Peterson (semifinals)
7. (Russia) Varvara Gracheva (quarterfinals)
8. (France) Clara Burel (second round)

== Draw ==
Key

- Q = Qualifier
- WC = Wild card
- LL = Lucky loser
- Alt = Alternate
- ITF = ITF entry
- PR = Protected ranking
- SR = Special ranking
- SE = Special exempt
- JE = Junior exempt
- JR = Junior Accelerator Programme entrant
- CO = College Accelerator Programme entrant
- NG = Next Gen Accelerator Program entrant
- w/o = Walkover
- r = Retired
- d = Defaulted

=== Finals ===
Semifinals
1	(Kazakhstan) Yulia Putintseva	6	6
6	(Sweden) Rebecca Peterson	2	4
(Romania) Jaqueline Cristian	3	3
2	(Belgium) Alison Van Uytvanck	6	6

Final
1	(Kazakhstan) Yulia Putintseva	6	4	3
2	(Belgium) Alison Van Uytvanck	1	6	6

=== Top half ===
First round
1	(Kazakhstan) Y Putintseva	6	6
(Georgia (country)) E Gorgodze	1	2
PR	(Belarus) V Lapko	7	4	6
(Germany) J Niemeier	5	6	4
(Russia) A Gasanova	6	6
Q	(Belarus) Y Hatouka	1	1
LL	(Poland) U Radwańska	6^{6}	1
5	(Croatia) A Konjuh	7^{8}	6
3	(France) K Mladenovic	6	6^{5}	6
WC	(Kazakhstan) A Danilina	4	7^{7}	4
(Netherlands) L Pattinama Kerkhove	5	1
WC	(Russia) A Potapova	7	6
(Kazakhstan) Z Diyas	7^{8}	4	7
Q	(Russia) A Zakharova	6^{6}	6	5
(Switzerland) S Vögele	5	6	3
6	(Sweden) R Peterson	7	4	6

Second round
1	(Kazakhstan) Y Putintseva	6	6
PR	(Belarus) V Lapko	4	4
(Russia) A Gasanova	2	7^{7}	6
5	(Croatia) A Konjuh	6	6^{4}	2
3	(France) K Mladenovic	6	4	3
WC	(Russia) A Potapova	1	6	6
(Kazakhstan) Z Diyas	2	2
6	(Sweden) R Peterson	6	6

Quarterfinals
1	(Kazakhstan) Y Putintseva	6	4	6
(Russia) A Gasanova	3	6	0
WC	(Russia) A Potapova	4	7^{9}	4
6	(Sweden) R Peterson	6	6^{7}	6

Semifinals
1	(Kazakhstan) Y Putintseva	6	6
6	(Sweden) R Peterson	2	4

=== Bottom half ===
First round
8	(France) C Burel	5
PR	(Luxembourg) M Minella	2^{r}
(Romania) J Cristian	4	7	6
Q	(Russia) N Vikhlyantseva	6	5	2
Q	(Serbia) A Krunić	3	6	7
Q	(United Kingdom) K Boulter	6	3	5
(Slovenia) K Juvan	2	7^{7}	6
4	(Belgium) G Minnen	6	6^{5}	4
7	(Russia) V Gracheva	6	7^{7}
(Czech Republic) Kr Plíšková	3	6^{5}
Q	(Ukraine) L Tsurenko	6	3
PR	(Russia) V Diatchenko	1	1^{r}
(Germany) A-L Friedsam	4	6	6
(Australia) Ar Rodionova	6	4	2
WC	(Kazakhstan) Z Kulambayeva	3	4
2	(Belgium) A Van Uytvanck	6	6

Second round
8	(France) C Burel	7^{7}	1	2
(Romania) J Cristian	6^{3}	6	6
Q	(Serbia) A Krunić	6	6
(Slovenia) K Juvan	4	3
7	(Russia) V Gracheva	6	6
Q	(Ukraine) L Tsurenko	2	4
(Germany) A-L Friedsam	4	6	4
2	(Belgium) A Van Uytvanck	6	3	6

Quarterfinals
(Romania) J Cristian	6	6
Q	(Serbia) A Krunić	4	3
7	(Russia) V Gracheva	4	4
2	(Belgium) A Van Uytvanck	6	6

Semifinals
(Romania) J Cristian	3	3
2	(Belgium) A Van Uytvanck	6	6

== Qualifying ==
=== Seeds ===
1. (Italy) Lucia Bronzetti (qualifying competition)
2. (United Kingdom) Katie Boulter (qualified)
3. (Ukraine) Lesia Tsurenko (qualified)
4. (Serbia) Aleksandra Krunić (qualified)
5. (Russia) Natalia Vikhlyantseva (qualified)
6. (Russia) Valeria Savinykh (first round)
7. (Poland) Urszula Radwańska (qualifying competition, lucky loser)
8. (Romania) Monica Niculescu (qualifying competition, withdrew)
9. (Russia) Anastasia Zakharova (qualified)
10. (Belarus) Yuliya Hatouka (qualified)
11. (United Kingdom) Samantha Murray Sharan (qualifying competition)
12. (Ukraine) Valeriya Strakhova (qualifying competition)

=== Qualifiers ===
1. (Belarus) Yuliya Hatouka
2. (United Kingdom) Katie Boulter
3. (Ukraine) Lesia Tsurenko
4. (Serbia) Aleksandra Krunić
5. (Russia) Natalia Vikhlyantseva
6. (Russia) Anastasia Zakharova

=== Lucky loser ===
1. (Poland) Urszula Radwańska

=== Draw ===
==== First qualifier ====
First round
1	(Italy) Lucia Bronzetti	6	6
WC	(Russia) Yana Sizikova	2	4
WC	(Kazakhstan) Gozal Ainitdinova	3	1
10	(Belarus) Yuliya Hatouka	6	6

Qualifying competition
1	(Italy) Lucia Bronzetti	4	6	6^{3}
10	(Belarus) Yuliya Hatouka	6	3	7^{7}

==== Second qualifier ====
First round
2	(United Kingdom) Katie Boulter	6	6
WC	(Kazakhstan) Dana Baidaulet	2	1
PR	(Russia) Angelina Gabueva	4	3
11/PR	(United Kingdom) Samantha Murray Sharan	6	6

Qualifying competition
2	(United Kingdom) Katie Boulter	6	6
11/PR	(United Kingdom) Samantha Murray Sharan	0	4

==== Third qualifier ====
First round
3	(Ukraine) Lesia Tsurenko	6	6
(India) Rutuja Bhosale	0	3
WC	(Kazakhstan) Sofiya Chursina	3	3
7	(Poland) Urszula Radwańska	6	6

Qualifying competition
3	(Ukraine) Lesia Tsurenko	7	6
7	(Poland) Urszula Radwańska	5	1

==== Fourth qualifier ====
First round
4	(Serbia) Aleksandra Krunić	6	6
(Russia) Daria Mishina	2	1
WC	(Kazakhstan) Yekaterina Dmitrichenko	2	2
12	(Ukraine) Valeriya Strakhova	6	6

Qualifying competition
4	(Serbia) Aleksandra Krunić	6	6
12	(Ukraine) Valeriya Strakhova	3	1

==== Fifth qualifier ====
First round
5	(Russia) Natalia Vikhlyantseva	6	3	6
WC	(Kazakhstan) Tatyana Nikolenko	0	6	1
(United Kingdom) Emily Webley-Smith	1	1
8	(Romania) Monica Niculescu	6	6

Qualifying competition
5	(Russia) Natalia Vikhlyantseva	w/o
8	(Romania) Monica Niculescu

==== Sixth qualifier ====
First round
6	(Russia) Valeria Savinykh	6	2	2
(Russia) Ekaterina Yashina	4	6	6
(Russia) Ekaterina Kazionova	3	2
9	(Russia) Anastasia Zakharova	6	6

Qualifying competition
(Russia) Ekaterina Yashina	2	3
9	(Russia) Anastasia Zakharova	6	6
