= 2021 Astana Open – Women's doubles =

Women's doubles
- 2021 Astana Open

Final
- Champions: (Germany) Anna-Lena Friedsam (Romania) Monica Niculescu
- Runners-up: (Russia) Angelina Gabueva (Russia) Anastasia Zakharova
- Score: 6–2, 4–6, [10–5]

Events
Singles	men	women
Doubles	men	women
Astana Open

This was the first edition of the women's event.

Anna-Lena Friedsam and Monica Niculescu won the title, defeating Angelina Gabueva and Anastasia Zakharova in the final, 6–2, 4–6, [10–5].

== Seeds ==
1. (Belgium) Greet Minnen / (Belgium) Alison Van Uytvanck (first round, retired)
2. (Russia) Anna Blinkova / (Kazakhstan) Anna Danilina (quarterfinals)
3. (Germany) Anna-Lena Friedsam / (Romania) Monica Niculescu (champions)
4. (Russia) Varvara Gracheva / (Georgia (country)) Oksana Kalashnikova (first round)

== Draw ==
=== Key ===
- Q = Qualifier
- WC = Wild card
- LL = Lucky loser
- Alt = Alternate
- SE = Special exempt
- PR = Protected ranking
- ITF = ITF entry
- JE = Junior exempt
- w/o = Walkover
- r = Retired
- d = Defaulted
- SR = Special ranking

=== Draw ===
First round
1	(Belgium) G Minnen (Belgium) A Van Uytvanck	2	1^{r}
(Russia) V Diatchenko (Russia) Y Sizikova	6	0
(Belarus) V Lapko (Belarus) L Marozava	6	4	[10]
(India) R Bhosale (United Kingdom) E Webley-Smith	2	6	[1]
3	(Germany) A-L Friedsam (Romania) M Niculescu	6	7
WC	(Kazakhstan) S Chursina (Kazakhstan) Y Dmitrichenko	2	5
(Luxembourg) M Minella (Sweden) R Peterson	7	6^{7}	[5]
(Ukraine) V Strakhova (Russia) E Yashina	5	7^{9}	[10]
(Romania) J Cristian (Georgia (country)) E Gorgodze	3	4
(United Kingdom) S Murray Sharan (Russia) V Savinykh	6	6
(Russia) A Gabueva (Russia) A Zakharova	3	6	[10]
4	(Russia) V Gracheva (Georgia (country)) O Kalashnikova	6	4	[6]
(Russia) N Dzalamidze (Slovenia) K Juvan	w/o
(Russia) A Gasanova (Russia) N Vikhlyantseva
WC	(Kazakhstan) G Ainitdinova (Kazakhstan) Z Kulambayeva	3	6	[8]
2	(Russia) A Blinkova (Kazakhstan) A Danilina	6	0	[10]

Quarterfinals
(Russia) V Diatchenko (Russia) Y Sizikova	5	6	[10]
(Belarus) V Lapko (Belarus) L Marozava	7	4	[7]
3	(Germany) A-L Friedsam (Romania) M Niculescu	6	6
(Ukraine) V Strakhova (Russia) E Yashina	1	1
(United Kingdom) S Murray Sharan (Russia) V Savinykh	5	3
(Russia) A Gabueva (Russia) A Zakharova	7	6
(Russia) N Dzalamidze (Slovenia) K Juvan	6	6^{5}	[10]
2	(Russia) A Blinkova (Kazakhstan) A Danilina	1	7^{7}	[5]

Semifinals
(Russia) V Diatchenko (Russia) Y Sizikova	4	6	[8]
3	(Germany) A-L Friedsam (Romania) M Niculescu	6	3	[10]
(Russia) A Gabueva (Russia) A Zakharova	6	6
(Russia) N Dzalamidze (Slovenia) K Juvan	4	3

Final
3	(Germany) A-L Friedsam (Romania) M Niculescu	6	4	[10]
(Russia) A Gabueva (Russia) A Zakharova	2	6	[5]
