= 2021 Astana Open – Men's doubles =

Tennis tournament

Men's doubles
- 2021 Astana Open

Final
- Champions: (Mexico) Santiago González (Argentina) Andrés Molteni
- Runners-up: (Israel) Jonathan Erlich (Belarus) Andrei Vasilevski
- Score: 6–1, 6–2

Events
| Singles | men | women |
| Doubles | men | women |
| ← 2020 · | Astana Open | · 2022 → |

Sander Gillé and Joran Vliegen were the defending champions, but chose not to participate this year.

Santiago González and Andrés Molteni won the title, defeating Jonathan Erlich and Andrei Vasilevski in the final, 6–1, 6–2.

== Seeds ==
1. (Mexico) Santiago González / (Argentina) Andrés Molteni (champions)
2. (Kazakhstan) Andrey Golubev / (Kazakhstan) Aleksandr Nedovyesov (quarterfinals)
3. (Brazil) Marcelo Demoliner / (Brazil) Rafael Matos (first round)
4. (Sweden) André Göransson / (Italy) Andrea Vavassori (quarterfinals)

== Draw ==
Key

- Q = Qualifier
- WC = Wild card
- LL = Lucky loser
- Alt = Alternate
- ITF = ITF entry
- PR = Protected ranking
- SR = Special ranking
- SE = Special exempt
- JE = Junior exempt
- JR = Junior Accelerator Programme entrant
- CO = College Accelerator Programme entrant
- NG = Next Gen Accelerator Program entrant
- w/o = Walkover
- r = Retired
- d = Defaulted

=== Draw ===
First round
1 | (Mexico) S González (Argentina) A Molteni | 6 | 6^{5} | [10]
WC | (Kazakhstan) D Popko (Kazakhstan) T Skatov | 4 | 7^{7} | [6]
(Netherlands) D Pel (Pakistan) A-u-H Qureshi | 6^{4} | 3
(United Kingdom) L Glasspool (Finland) H Heliövaara | 7^{7} | 6
4 | (Sweden) A Göransson (Italy) A Vavassori | 6 | 4 | [11]
(Germany) A Begemann (United States) N Lammons | 4 | 6 | [9]
(Lithuania) R Berankis (New Zealand) A Sitak | 7 | 6
(Finland) E Ruusuvuori (Italy) A Seppi | 5 | 3
(Spain) J Munar (Australia) M Polmans | 7^{7} | 4 | [10]
WC | (Kazakhstan) A Bublik (Russia) D Golubev | 6^{5} | 6 | [8]
(Israel) J Erlich (Belarus) A Vasilevski | 6 | 1 | [10]
3 | (Brazil) M Demoliner (Brazil) R Matos | 1 | 6 | [7]
(Monaco) R Arneodo (France) B Bonzi | 6 | 7
(Czech Republic) R Jebavý (Czech Republic) J Veselý | 3 | 5
(Australia) J Duckworth (Australia) M Ebden | 6^{7} | 2
2 | (Kazakhstan) A Golubev (Kazakhstan) A Nedovyesov | 7^{9} | 6

Quarterfinals
1 | (Mexico) S González (Argentina) A Molteni | 5 | 6 | [10]
(United Kingdom) L Glasspool (Finland) H Heliövaara | 7 | 4 | [8]
4 | (Sweden) A Göransson (Italy) A Vavassori | 5 | 6 | [7]
(Lithuania) R Berankis (New Zealand) A Sitak | 7 | 3 | [10]
(Spain) J Munar (Australia) M Polmans | 1 | 2
(Israel) J Erlich (Belarus) A Vasilevski | 6 | 6
(Monaco) R Arneodo (France) B Bonzi | 6 | 4 | [10]
2 | (Kazakhstan) A Golubev (Kazakhstan) A Nedovyesov | 4 | 6 | [7]

Semifinals
1 | (Mexico) S González (Argentina) A Molteni | 6 | 6
(Lithuania) R Berankis (New Zealand) A Sitak | 4 | 0
(Israel) J Erlich (Belarus) A Vasilevski | 7^{9} | 7^{7}
(Monaco) R Arneodo (France) B Bonzi | 6^{7} | 6^{5}

Final
1 | (Mexico) S González (Argentina) A Molteni | 6 | 6
(Israel) J Erlich (Belarus) A Vasilevski | 1 | 2
