= 2021 Astana Open – Men's singles =

Tennis tournament

Men's singles
- 2021 Astana Open

Final
- Champion: (South Korea) Kwon Soon-woo
- Runner-up: (Australia) James Duckworth
- Score: 7–6^{(8–6)}, 6–3

Events
| Singles | men | women |
| Doubles | men | women |
| ← 2020 · | Astana Open | · 2022 → |

John Millman was the defending champion, but lost in the quarterfinals to James Duckworth.

Kwon Soon-woo won his first ATP Tour title, defeating Duckworth in the final, 7–6^{(8–6)}, 6–3. Kwon became the first South Korean player to win a title at ATP Tour level since Lee Hyung-taik in the 2003 Sydney tournament.

== Seeds ==
The top four seeds received a bye into the second round.

1. (Russia) Aslan Karatsev (second round)
2. (Kazakhstan) Alexander Bublik (semifinals)
3. (Serbia) Dušan Lajović (second round)
4. (Serbia) Filip Krajinović (second round)
5. (Australia) John Millman (quarterfinals)
6. (France) Benoît Paire (first round)
7. (Serbia) Laslo Đere (quarterfinals)
8. (Belarus) Ilya Ivashka (semifinals)

== Draw ==
=== Key ===
- Q = Qualifier
- WC = Wild card
- LL = Lucky loser
- Alt = Alternate
- SE = Special exempt
- PR = Protected ranking
- ITF = ITF entry
- JE = Junior exempt
- w/o = Walkover
- r = Retired
- d = Defaulted
- SR = Special ranking

=== Finals ===
Semifinals
8 | (Belarus) Ilya Ivashka | 3 | 6^{4}
(Australia) James Duckworth | 6 | 7^{7}
(South Korea) Kwon Soon-woo | 3 | 7 | 6
2 | (Kazakhstan) Alexander Bublik | 6 | 5 | 3

Final
(Australia) James Duckworth | 6^{6} | 3
(South Korea) Kwon Soon-woo | 7^{8} | 6

=== Top half ===
First round
(Finland) E Ruusuvuori | 6 | 0
(France) B Bonzi | 2 | 0^{r}
(Italy) A Seppi | 6^{3} | 6 | 1
WC | (Kazakhstan) T Skatov | 7^{7} | 4 | 6
Q | (Sweden) E Ymer | 2 | 4
8 | (Belarus) I Ivashka | 6 | 6
WC | (Kazakhstan) M Kukushkin | 6^{3} | 1
(Australia) J Duckworth | 7^{7} | 6
(Czech Republic) J Veselý | 3 | 6^{6}
(Spain) J Munar | 6 | 7^{8}
Q | (Kazakhstan) D Popko | 6 | 1 | 4
5 | (Australia) J Millman | 3 | 6 | 6

Second round
1 | (Russia) A Karatsev | 6^{6} | 4
(Finland) E Ruusuvuori | 7^{8} | 6
WC | (Kazakhstan) T Skatov | 2 | 3
8 | (Belarus) I Ivashka | 6 | 6
4 | (Serbia) F Krajinović | 6^{2} | 3
(Australia) J Duckworth | 7^{7} | 6
(Spain) J Munar | 4 | 7^{7} | 5
5 | (Australia) J Millman | 6 | 6^{5} | 7

Quarterfinals
(Finland) E Ruusuvuori | 6 | 4 | 1
8 | (Belarus) I Ivashka | 4 | 6 | 6
(Australia) J Duckworth | 6 | 6
5 | (Australia) J Millman | 4 | 4

Semifinals
8 | (Belarus) I Ivashka | 3 | 6^{4}
(Australia) J Duckworth | 6 | 7^{7}

=== Bottom half ===
First round
7 | (Serbia) L Đere | 6 | 3 | 6
(Colombia) DE Galán | 4 | 6 | 4
Q | (Australia) M Polmans | 4 | 6 | 4
(Italy) L Musetti | 6 | 2 | 6
(South Korea) S-w Kwon | 6 | 6
Q | (Russia) E Donskoy | 4 | 3
6 | (France) B Paire | 5 | 4
(Belarus) E Gerasimov | 7 | 6
(Spain) C Taberner | 7 | 6
(Lithuania) R Berankis | 5 | 4
WC | (Spain) F Verdasco | 4 | 2
(Serbia) M Kecmanović | 6 | 6

Second round
7 | (Serbia) L Đere | 6 | 6^{3} | 6
(Italy) L Musetti | 4 | 7^{7} | 4
(South Korea) S-w Kwon | 7 | 6
3 | (Serbia) D Lajović | 5 | 4
(Belarus) E Gerasimov | 7 | 6^{5} | 5
(Spain) C Taberner | 5 | 7^{7} | 7
(Serbia) M Kecmanović | 6 | 3 | 5
2 | (Kazakhstan) A Bublik | 2 | 6 | 7

Quarterfinals
7 | (Serbia) L Đere | 6^{4} | 6 | 0
(South Korea) S-w Kwon | 7^{7} | 2 | 6
(Spain) C Taberner | 3 | 4
2 | (Kazakhstan) A Bublik | 6 | 6

Semifinals
(South Korea) S-w Kwon | 3 | 7 | 6
2 | (Kazakhstan) A Bublik | 6 | 5 | 3

== Qualifying ==
=== Seeds ===
1. (Austria) Jurij Rodionov (first round)
2. (United States) Maxime Cressy (qualifying competition)
3. (Australia) Marc Polmans (qualified)
4. (Russia) Evgeny Donskoy (qualified)
5. (Ukraine) Illya Marchenko (first round)
6. (Poland) Kacper Żuk (first round)
7. (Sweden) Elias Ymer (qualified)
8. (Kazakhstan) Dmitry Popko (qualified)

=== Qualifiers ===
1. (Kazakhstan) Dmitry Popko
2. (Sweden) Elias Ymer
3. (Australia) Marc Polmans
4. (Russia) Evgeny Donskoy

=== Qualifying draw ===
==== First qualifier ====
First round
1 | (Austria) Jurij Rodionov | 5 | 4
(Australia) Matthew Ebden | 7 | 6
WC | (Bulgaria) Simon Anthony Ivanov | 2 | 3
8 | (Kazakhstan) Dmitry Popko | 6 | 6

Qualifying competition
(Australia) Matthew Ebden | 6 | 3 | 4
8 | (Kazakhstan) Dmitry Popko | 3 | 6 | 6

==== Second qualifier ====
First round
2 | (United States) Maxime Cressy | 6 | 2
(Australia) Bernard Tomic | 3 | 1^{r}
WC | (Kazakhstan) Grigoriy Lomakin | 3 | 2
7 | (Sweden) Elias Ymer | 6 | 6

Qualifying competition
2 | (United States) Maxime Cressy | 3 | 6 | 4
7 | (Sweden) Elias Ymer | 6 | 4 | 6

==== Third qualifier ====
First round
3 | (Australia) Marc Polmans | 2 | 7 | 4
(Italy) Gian Marco Moroni | 6 | 5 | 1^{r}
Alt | (Kazakhstan) Denis Yevseyev | 6 | 6
5 | (Ukraine) Illya Marchenko | 4 | 4

Qualifying competition
3 | (Australia) Marc Polmans | 6 | 6
Alt | (Kazakhstan) Denis Yevseyev | 4 | 2

==== Fourth qualifier ====
First round
4 | (Russia) Evgeny Donskoy | 7^{7} | 6
(Italy) Andrea Vavassori | 6^{4} | 2
(Russia) Pavel Kotov | 6 | 6
6 | (Poland) Kacper Żuk | 2 | 3

Qualifying competition
4 | (Russia) Evgeny Donskoy | 6 | 7^{7}
(Russia) Pavel Kotov | 3 | 6^{4}
