= Rithvik Choudary Bollipalli =

Indian tennis player (born 2001)

- Country (sports): India
- Residence: Hyderabad, India
- Born: 17 January 2001 (age 25) Hyderabad, India
- Height: 188 cm (6 ft 2 in)
- Turned pro: 2022
- Plays: Right-handed (two-handed backhand)
- Prize money: $234,462

Singles
- Career record: 0–0

Doubles
- Career record: 12–11
- Career titles: 2
- Highest ranking: No. 65 (3 March 2025)
- Current ranking: No. 218 (16 November 2026)

Grand Slam doubles results
- Australian Open: 1R (2025)
- French Open: 1R (2025)
- Wimbledon: 2R (2025)
- US Open: 1R (2025)
- Last updated on: 20 November 2026.

Rithvik Choudary Bollipalli (born 17 January 2001) is an Indian tennis player. He has a career-high ATP doubles ranking of No. 65 achieved on 3 March 2025.

== Career ==
Alongside Niki Kaliyanda Poonacha, Bollipalli won the 2024 San Luis Open Challenger, defeating Antoine Bellier and Marc-Andrea Hüsler in the final.

Partnering Arjun Kadhe, he won his first ATP title at the 2024 Almaty Open, defeating Nicolás Barrientos and Skander Mansouri in the final.

== ATP Tour finals ==
=== Doubles: 2 (2 titles) ===
Legend Grand Slam (0–0) ATP Masters 1000 (0–0) ATP 500 Series (0–0) ATP 250 Series (2–0)	Finals by surface Hard (1–0) Clay (1–0) Grass (0–0)

Result	W–L	Date	Tournament	Tier	Surface	Partner	Opponents	Score
Win	1–0	Oct 2024	Almaty Open, Kazakhstan	ATP 250	Hard (i)	(India) Arjun Kadhe	(Colombia) Nicolás Barrientos (Tunisia) Skander Mansouri	3–6, 7–6^{(7–3)}, [14–12]
Win	2–0	Mar 2025	Chile Open, Chile	ATP 250	Clay	(Colombia) Nicolás Barrientos	(Argentina) Máximo González (Argentina) Andrés Molteni	6–3, 6–2
