= Almaty Open =

Tournament information
- Event name: Almaty Open
- Founded: 2020
- Location: Almaty (2024-present); Astana (2020-2023); Kazakhstan
- Venue: Almaty Arena (2024-present); Daulet National Tennis Centre (2020-2023)
- Surface: Hard (indoor)
- Website: website

Current champions (2026)
- Men's singles: Daniil Medvedev
- Men's doubles: (India) Yuki Bhambri (United States) Ryan Seggerman
ATP Tour
- Category: ATP 250
- Draw: 28S / 16Q / 16D
- Prize money: $1,036,700 (2024)
WTA Tour
- Category: WTA 250
- Draw: 32S / 16Q / 16D
- Prize money: $235,238 (2021)

The Almaty Open (formerly the Astana Open) is a professional tennis tournament, held in Almaty, Kazakhstan. The event is held in October on indoor hardcourts.

It was primarily organized due to the cancellation of many tournaments during the ATP 2020 season as a result of the COVID-19 pandemic. In 2021, the tournament was carried out as a combined event, with a women's tournament being played the week after the men's (as part of the WTA Tour). It was the first time in history that an ATP and a WTA tournament had been held in Kazakhstan. The WTA event would be discontinued the following year. In 2024, the tournament moved from its original location, Astana, to Almaty.

== Past finals ==
=== Men's singles ===
Year	Champion	Runner-up	Score
↓ Astana ↓
↓ ATP Tour 250 ↓
2020	(Australia) John Millman	(France) Adrian Mannarino	7–5, 6–1
2021	(South Korea) Kwon Soon-woo	(Australia) James Duckworth	7–6^{(8–6)}, 6–3
↓ ATP Tour 500 ↓
2022	(Serbia) Novak Djokovic	(Greece) Stefanos Tsitsipas	6–3, 6–4
↓ ATP Tour 250 ↓
2023	(France) Adrian Mannarino	(United States) Sebastian Korda	4–6, 6–3, 6–2
↓ Almaty ↓
2024	Karen Khachanov	(Canada) Gabriel Diallo	6–2, 5–7, 6–3
2025	Daniil Medvedev	(France) Corentin Moutet	7–5, 4–6, 6–3
2026	Daniil Medvedev	(Georgia (country)) Nikoloz Basilashvili	6–7^{(6–8)}, 6–1, 6–3

=== Women's singles ===
Year	Champion	Runner-up	Score
Astana
2021	(Belgium) Alison Van Uytvanck	(Kazakhstan) Yulia Putintseva	1–6, 6–4, 6–3

=== Men's doubles ===
Year	Champions	Runners-up	Score
↓ Astana ↓
↓ ATP Tour 250 ↓
2020	(Belgium) Sander Gillé (Belgium) Joran Vliegen	(Australia) Max Purcell (Australia) Luke Saville	7–5, 6–3
2021	(Mexico) Santiago González (Argentina) Andrés Molteni	(Israel) Jonathan Erlich (Belarus) Andrei Vasilevski	6–1, 6–2
↓ ATP Tour 500 ↓
2022	(Croatia) Nikola Mektić (Croatia) Mate Pavić	(France) Adrian Mannarino (France) Fabrice Martin	6–4, 6–2
↓ ATP Tour 250 ↓
2023	(United States) Nathaniel Lammons (United States) Jackson Withrow	(Croatia) Mate Pavić (Australia) John Peers	7–6^{(7–4)}, 7–6^{(9–7)}
↓ Almaty ↓
2024	(India) Rithvik Choudary Bollipalli (India) Arjun Kadhe	(Colombia) Nicolás Barrientos (Tunisia) Skander Mansouri	3–6, 7–6^{(7–3)}, [14–12]
2025	(France) Théo Arribagé (France) Albano Olivetti	(Germany) Jakob Schnaitter (Germany) Mark Wallner	6–4, 7–6^{(10–8)}
2026	(India) Yuki Bhambri (United States) Ryan Seggerman	(Austria) Lucas Miedler (Austria) Neil Oberleitner	7–6^{(7–3)}, 6–7^{(1–7)}, [10–2]

=== Women's doubles ===
Year	Champions	Runners-up	Score
Astana
2021	(Germany) Anna-Lena Friedsam (Romania) Monica Niculescu	(Russia) Angelina Gabueva (Russia) Anastasia Zakharova	6–2, 4–6, [10–5]
