= Amir Omarkhanov =

Kazakhstani tennis player (born 2007)

- Full name: Amir Gabituly Omarkhanov
- Native name: Әмір Ғабитұлы Омарханов
- Country (sports): Kazakhstan
- Born: 17 November 2007 (age 18) Karaganda, Kazakhstan
- Height: 1.80 m (5 ft 11 in)
- Plays: Right-handed (two-handed backhand)
- Coach: Nemanja Lalić, Magnus Tideman
- Prize money: US $56,581

Singles
- Career record: 0–1 (at ATP Tour level, Grand Slam level, and in Davis Cup)
- Career titles: 0
- Highest ranking: No. 599 (16 November 2026)
- Current ranking: No. 599 (16 November 2026)

Doubles
- Career record: 0–2 (at ATP Tour level, Grand Slam level, and in Davis Cup)
- Career titles: 0
- Highest ranking: No. 686 (30 March 2026)
- Current ranking: No. 936 (16 November 2026)
- Last updated on: 16 November 2026.

Amir Gabituly Omarkhanov (Kazakh: Әмір Ғабитұлы Омарханов; born 17 November 2007) is a Kazakhstani tennis player. He has a career-high ATP singles ranking of No. 599 achieved on 16 November 2026 and a doubles ranking of No. 686 achieved on 30 March 2026.

Omarkhanov plays mostly on ITF Men's Tour, where he has won one title in singles and two in doubles.

== Early life ==
Omarkhanov was born in Karaganda. His father, Gabit, played amateur tennis and his brother, Malik, plays tennis at the University of Northwestern Ohio.

He originally trained at the Karaganda Tennis School before moving to Belgrade to attend the Janko Tipsarević Academy, where he trained under the guidance of Peter Nesterov. He also briefly trained at the Tennis Europe Academy in Prostějov for six months.

== Junior career ==
Omarkhanov had successful results on the ITF junior circuit, maintaining a 105–56 singles win-loss record. In December 2020, he made his ITF Juniors debut at the J100 event in Nur-Sultan, where he recorded his first win over Oleg Gussakov. In September 2021, he reached his first final at the J30 Autumn Cup in Baku, but lost to Tamerlan Azizov. The following year, he reached back-to-back finals at the J60 event in Tashkent and the J60 Tajikistan Open in Dushanbe.

In January 2024, Omarkhanov made his Junior Grand Slam debut at the Australian Open, where he reached the boys' singles quarterfinals. His ranking subsequently rose to No. 16. In June 2024, he reached the boys' doubles semifinals of the French Open, partnering Timofei Derepasko; he was the third Kazakhstani player to reach the doubles semifinal of a Junior Grand Slam, after Irina Selyutina in 1997 and Amina Rakhim in 2005.

In January 2025, Omarkhanov reached the boys' singles third round of the Australian Open.

He reached an ITF junior combined ranking of world No. 4 on 6 January 2025.

== Professional career ==
In April 2024, Omarkhanov received a wildcard into the qualifiers of the Mutua Madrid Open, but lost in the first round to Roberto Bautista Agut. In October 2025, he received a wildcard into the main draw of the Almaty Open, where he lost to Gabriel Diallo.

== Performance timelines ==
Key
W	F	SF	QF	#R	RR	Q#	P#	DNQ	A	Z#	PO	G	S	B	NMS	NTI	P	NH

(W) winner; (F) finalist; (SF) semifinalist; (QF) quarterfinalist; (#R) rounds 4, 3, 2, 1; (RR) round-robin stage; (Q#) qualification round; (P#) preliminary round; (DNQ) did not qualify; (A) absent; (Z#) Davis/Fed Cup Zonal Group (with number indication) or (PO) play-off; (G) gold, (S) silver or (B) bronze Olympic/Paralympic medal; (NMS) not a Masters tournament; (NTI) not a Tier I tournament; (P) postponed; (NH) not held; (SR) strike rate (events won / competed); (W–L) win–loss record.
To avoid confusion and double counting, these charts are updated at the conclusion of a tournament or when the player's participation has ended.

=== Singles ===
Current through the 2024 Madrid Open.

Tournament	2024	SR	W–L	Win%
ATP Tour Masters 1000
Madrid Open	Q1	0 / 0	0–0	–
Win–loss	0–0	0 / 0	0–0	–

== ITF World Tennis Tour finals ==
=== Singles: 3 (2 titles, 1 runner-up) ===
Legend ITF WTT (2–1)

Result	W–L	Date	Tournament	Tier	Surface	Opponent	Score
Win	1–0	Nov 2025	M15 Monastir, Tunisia	WTT	Hard	(Germany) Max Schönhaus	6–3, 3–6, 6–4
Loss	1–1	Mar 2026	M15 Monastir, Tunisia	WTT	Hard	(New Zealand) Anton Shepp	3–6, 6–7^{(7–9)}
Win	2–1	Mar 2026	M15 Monastir, Tunisia	WTT	Hard	(Turkey) Mert Alkaya	7–5, 1–6, 7–5

=== Doubles: 3 (2 titles, 1 runner-up) ===
Legend ITF WTT (2–1)	Finals by surface Hard (2–0) Clay (0–1)

Result	W–L	Date	Tournament	Tier	Surface	Partner	Opponents	Score
Loss	0–1	May 2025	M25 Reggio Emilia, Italy	WTT	Clay	(Italy) Alexandr Binda	Kirill Kivattsev (Italy) Tommaso Compagnucci	4–6, 5–7
Win	1–1	Jan 2026	M15 Manacor, Spain	WTT	Hard	(United States) Gavin Young	(Australia) Ty Host; Egor Pleshivtsev	5–7, 6–3, [10–8]
Win	2–1	Feb 2026	M15 Monastir, Tunisia	WTT	Hard	(Italy) Matteo Sciahbasi	(France) Alexandre Aubriot (France) César Bouchelaghem	6–4, 6–3
