= 2022 WTA 1000 tournaments =

Women's professional tennis tour

2022 WTA 1000
Details
- Duration: February 21 – October 30
- Edition: 33rd
- Tournaments: 8

Achievements (singles)
- Most titles: (Poland) Iga Świątek (4)
- Most finals: (Poland) Iga Świątek (4)

The WTA 1000 Mandatory and non-Mandatory tournaments, which are part of the WTA 1000 tournaments, make up the elite tour for professional women's tennis organised by the WTA called the WTA Tour. There are four 1000 Mandatory tournaments: Indian Wells, Miami, Madrid and Beijing and five non-Mandatory tournaments: Doha, Rome, Canada, Cincinnati, and Guadalajara, the last of which was held starting this year as a substitute for Wuhan.

== Tournaments ==
| Tournament | Country | Location | Surface | Date | Prize money |
|---|---|---|---|---|---|
| Qatar Open | Qatar | Doha | Hard | Feb 21 – 27 | $2,331,698 |
| Indian Wells Open | United States | Indian Wells | Hard | Mar 7 – 20 | $8,369,455 |
| Miami Open | United States | Miami Gardens | Hard | Mar 21 – Apr 3 | $8,369,455 |
| Madrid Open | Spain | Madrid | Clay (red) | Apr 25 – May 2 | $6,575,560 |
| Italian Open | Italy | Rome | Clay (red) | May 9 – 15 | $2,527,250 |
| Canadian Open | Canada | Toronto | Hard | Aug 8 – 14 | $2,697,250 |
| Cincinnati Open | United States | Mason | Hard | Aug 15 – 21 | $2,527,250 |
| Guadalajara Open | Mexico | Guadalajara | Hard | Oct 17 – 30 | $2,527,250 |
| Wuhan Open | Suspended due to Peng Shuai allegation. | | | | |
| China Open | Suspended due to Peng Shuai allegation. | | | | |

== Results ==
* First-time champion

| Tournament | Singles champions | Runners-up | Score | Doubles champions | Runners-up | Score |
|---|---|---|---|---|---|---|
| Doha Singles – Doubles | (Poland) Iga Świątek | (Estonia) Anett Kontaveit | 6–2, 6–0 | (United States) Coco Gauff* (United States) Jessica Pegula* | Veronika Kudermetova (Belgium) Elise Mertens | 3–6, 7–5, [10–5] |
| Indian Wells Singles – Doubles | (Poland) Iga Świątek (2) | (Greece) Maria Sakkari | 6–4, 6–1 | (China) Xu Yifan | (United States) Asia Muhammad (Japan) Ena Shibahara | 7–5, 7–6^{(7–4)} |
| Indian Wells Singles – Doubles | (Poland) Iga Świątek (2) | (Greece) Maria Sakkari | 6–4, 6–1 | (China) Yang Zhaoxuan* | (United States) Asia Muhammad (Japan) Ena Shibahara | 7–5, 7–6^{(7–4)} |
| Miami Singles – Doubles | (Poland) Iga Świątek (3) | (Japan) Naomi Osaka | 6–4, 6–0 | (Germany) Laura Siegemund* | Veronika Kudermetova (Belgium) Elise Mertens | 7–6^{(7–3)}, 7–5 |
| Miami Singles – Doubles | (Poland) Iga Świątek (3) | (Japan) Naomi Osaka | 6–4, 6–0 | Vera Zvonareva | Veronika Kudermetova (Belgium) Elise Mertens | 7–6^{(7–3)}, 7–5 |
| Madrid Singles – Doubles | (Tunisia) Ons Jabeur* | (United States) Jessica Pegula | 7–5, 0–6, 6–2 | (Canada) Gabriela Dabrowski (Mexico) Giuliana Olmos | (United States) Desirae Krawczyk (Netherlands) Demi Schuurs | 7–6^{(7–1)}, 5–7, [10–7] |
| Rome Singles – Doubles | (Poland) Iga Świątek (4) | (Tunisia) Ons Jabeur | 6–2, 6–2 | Veronika Kudermetova; Anastasia Pavlyuchenkova | (Canada) Gabriela Dabrowski (Mexico) Giuliana Olmos | 1–6, 6–4, [10–7] |
| Toronto Singles – Doubles | (Romania) Simona Halep | (Brazil) Beatriz Haddad Maia | 6–3, 2–6, 6–3 | (United States) Coco Gauff (2) (United States) Jessica Pegula (2) | (United States) Nicole Melichar-Martinez (Australia) Ellen Perez | 6–4, 6–7^{(5–7)}, [10–5] |
| Cincinnati Singles – Doubles | (France) Caroline Garcia | (Czech Republic) Petra Kvitová | 6–2, 6–4 | (Ukraine) Lyudmyla Kichenok* | (United States) Nicole Melichar-Martinez (Australia) Ellen Perez | 7–6^{(7–5)}, 6–3 |
| Cincinnati Singles – Doubles | (France) Caroline Garcia | (Czech Republic) Petra Kvitová | 6–2, 6–4 | (Latvia) Jeļena Ostapenko | (United States) Nicole Melichar-Martinez (Australia) Ellen Perez | 7–6^{(7–5)}, 6–3 |
| Guadalajara Singles – Doubles | (United States) Jessica Pegula | (Greece) Maria Sakkari | 6–2, 6–3 | (Australia) Storm Hunter* | (Kazakhstan) Anna Danilina (Brazil) Beatriz Haddad Maia | 7–6^{(7–4)}, 6–7^{(2–7)}, [10–8] |
| Guadalajara Singles – Doubles | (United States) Jessica Pegula | (Greece) Maria Sakkari | 6–2, 6–3 | (Brazil) Luisa Stefani | (Kazakhstan) Anna Danilina (Brazil) Beatriz Haddad Maia | 7–6^{(7–4)}, 6–7^{(2–7)}, [10–8] |
| Wuhan | Suspended due to Peng Shuai allegation. | | | | | |
| Beijing | Suspended due to Peng Shuai allegation. | | | | | |

== Tournaments details ==
Key

- Q = Qualifier
- WC = Wild card
- LL = Lucky loser
- Alt = Alternate
- ITF = ITF entry
- PR = Protected ranking
- SR = Special ranking
- SE = Special exempt
- JE = Junior exempt
- JR = Junior Accelerator Programme entrant
- CO = College Accelerator Programme entrant
- NG = Next Gen Accelerator Program entrant
- w/o = Walkover
- r = Retired
- d = Defaulted

=== Qatar Open ===
==== Singles ====
Quarterfinals
1 | (Belarus) Aryna Sabalenka | 2 | 3
7 | (Poland) Iga Świątek | 6 | 6
14 | (United States) Coco Gauff | 3 | 3
6 | (Greece) Maria Sakkari | 6 | 6
8 | (Tunisia) Ons Jabeur | 4 | 1
4 | (Estonia) Anett Kontaveit | 6 | 6
5 | (Spain) Garbiñe Muguruza | 2 | 2
15 | (Latvia) Jeļena Ostapenko | 6 | 6

Semifinals
7 | (Poland) Iga Świątek | 6 | 6
6 | (Greece) Maria Sakkari | 4 | 3
4 | (Estonia) Anett Kontaveit | 6 | 6
15 | (Latvia) Jeļena Ostapenko | 1 | 4

Final
7 | (Poland) Iga Świątek | 6 | 6
4 | (Estonia) Anett Kontaveit | 2 | 0

==== Doubles ====
Semifinals
(Czech Republic) Lucie Hradecká (India) Sania Mirza | 0 | 3
3 | (Russia) Veronika Kudermetova (Belgium) Elise Mertens | 6 | 6
(Japan) Shuko Aoyama (Serbia) Aleksandra Krunić | 3 | 2
(United States) Coco Gauff (United States) Jessica Pegula | 6 | 6

Final
3 | (Russia) Veronika Kudermetova (Belgium) Elise Mertens | 6 | 5 | [5]
(United States) Coco Gauff (United States) Jessica Pegula | 3 | 7 | [10]

=== Indian Wells Open ===
==== Singles ====
Quarterfinals
24 | (Romania) Simona Halep | 6 | 6
(Croatia) Petra Martić | 1 | 1
3 | (Poland) Iga Świątek | 6 | 6
25 | (United States) Madison Keys | 1 | 0
5 | (Spain) Paula Badosa | 6 | 6
21 | (Russia) Veronika Kudermetova | 3 | 2
6 | (Greece) Maria Sakkari | 7 | 6
17 | (Kazakhstan) Elena Rybakina | 5 | 4

Semifinals
24 | (Romania) Simona Halep | 6^{6} | 4
3 | (Poland) Iga Świątek | 7^{8} | 6
5 | (Spain) Paula Badosa | 2 | 6 | 1
6 | (Greece) Maria Sakkari | 6 | 4 | 6

Final
3 | (Poland) Iga Świątek | 6 | 6
6 | (Greece) Maria Sakkari | 4 | 1

==== Doubles ====
Semifinals
5 | (Canada) Gabriela Dabrowski (Mexico) Giuliana Olmos | 6^{6} | 6 | [5]
7 | (United States) Asia Muhammad (Japan) Ena Shibahara | 7^{8} | 3 | [10]
(China) Xu Yifan (China) Yang Zhaoxuan | 7 | 6
(France) Alizé Cornet (Canada) Leylah Fernandez | 5 | 1

Final
7 | (United States) Asia Muhammad (Japan) Ena Shibahara | 5 | 6^{4}
(China) Xu Yifan (China) Yang Zhaoxuan | 7 | 7^{7}

=== Miami Open ===
==== Singles ====
Quarterfinals
22 | (Switzerland) Belinda Bencic | 6 | 6
WC | (Australia) Daria Saville | 1 | 2
(Japan) Naomi Osaka | 6 | 6
9 | (United States) Danielle Collins | 2 | 1
5 | (Spain) Paula Badosa | 1^{r}
16 | (United States) Jessica Pegula | 4
28 | (Czech Republic) Petra Kvitová | 3 | 3
2 | (Poland) Iga Świątek | 6 | 6

Semifinals
22 | (Switzerland) Belinda Bencic | 6 | 3 | 4
(Japan) Naomi Osaka | 4 | 6 | 6
16 | (United States) Jessica Pegula | 2 | 5
2 | (Poland) Iga Świątek | 6 | 7

Final
(Japan) Naomi Osaka | 4 | 0
2 | (Poland) Iga Świątek | 6 | 6

==== Doubles ====
Semifinals
1 | (Russia) Veronika Kudermetova (Belgium) Elise Mertens | 6 | 3 | [10]
4 | (United States) Coco Gauff (United States) Caty McNally | 4 | 6 | [2]
(Russia) Ekaterina Alexandrova (China) Yang Zhaoxuan | 6 | 2 | [11]
(Germany) Laura Siegemund (Russia) Vera Zvonareva | 3 | 6 | [13]

Final
1 | (Russia) Veronika Kudermetova (Belgium) Elise Mertens | 6^{3} | 5
(Germany) Laura Siegemund (Russia) Vera Zvonareva | 7^{7} | 7

=== Madrid Open ===
==== Singles ====
Quarterfinals
(Switzerland) Jil Teichmann | 6 | 6
(Ukraine) Anhelina Kalinina | 3 | 4
(Spain) Sara Sorribes Tormo | 4 | 2
12 | (United States) Jessica Pegula | 6 | 6
Q | (Russia) Ekaterina Alexandrova | 6 | 6
(United States) Amanda Anisimova | 4 | 3
8 | (Tunisia) Ons Jabeur | 6 | 6
(Romania) Simona Halep | 3 | 2

Semifinals
(Switzerland) Jil Teichmann | 3 | 4
12 | (United States) Jessica Pegula | 6 | 6
Q | (Russia) Ekaterina Alexandrova | 2 | 3
8 | (Tunisia) Ons Jabeur | 6 | 6

Final
12 | (United States) Jessica Pegula | 5 | 6 | 2
8 | (Tunisia) Ons Jabeur | 7 | 0 | 6

==== Doubles ====
Semifinals
1 | (Australia) Storm Sanders (China) Zhang Shuai | 5 | 6^{5}
3 | (United States) Desirae Krawczyk (Netherlands) Demi Schuurs | 7 | 7^{7}
(Ukraine) Lyudmyla Kichenok (Latvia) Jeļena Ostapenko | 7 | 1 | [6]
2 | (Canada) Gabriela Dabrowski (Mexico) Giuliana Olmos | 5 | 6 | [10]

Final
3 | (United States) Desirae Krawczyk (Netherlands) Demi Schuurs | 6^{1} | 7 | [7]
2 | (Canada) Gabriela Dabrowski (Mexico) Giuliana Olmos | 7^{7} | 5 | [10]

=== Italian Open ===
==== Singles ====
Quarterfinals
1 | (Poland) Iga Świątek | 7^{7} | 6
PR | (Canada) Bianca Andreescu | 6^{2} | 0
3 | (Belarus) Aryna Sabalenka | 4 | 6 | 6
(United States) Amanda Anisimova | 6 | 3 | 2
9 | (Tunisia) Ons Jabeur | 1 | 7 | 6
4 | (Greece) Maria Sakkari | 6 | 5 | 1
(Switzerland) Jil Teichmann | 4 | 2^{r}
(Russia) Daria Kasatkina | 6 | 3

Semifinals
1 | (Poland) Iga Świątek | 6 | 6
3 | (Belarus) Aryna Sabalenka | 2 | 1
9 | (Tunisia) Ons Jabeur | 6 | 1 | 7
(Russia) Daria Kasatkina | 4 | 6 | 5

Final
1 | (Poland) Iga Świątek | 6 | 6
9 | (Tunisia) Ons Jabeur | 2 | 2

==== Doubles ====
Semifinals
(Russia) Veronika Kudermetova (Russia) Anastasia Pavlyuchenkova | 1 | 7^{8} | [10]
3 | (United States) Desirae Krawczyk (Netherlands) Demi Schuurs | 6 | 6^{6} | [7]
6 | (Czech Republic) Lucie Hradecká (India) Sania Mirza | 1 | 2
2 | (Canada) Gabriela Dabrowski (Mexico) Giuliana Olmos | 6 | 6

Final
(Russia) Veronika Kudermetova (Russia) Anastasia Pavlyuchenkova | 1 | 6 | [10]
2 | (Canada) Gabriela Dabrowski (Mexico) Giuliana Olmos | 6 | 4 | [7]

=== Canadian Open ===
==== Singles ====
Quarterfinals
(Brazil) Beatriz Haddad Maia | 2 | 6 | 6
12 | (Switzerland) Belinda Bencic | 6 | 3 | 3
14 | (Czech Republic) Karolína Plíšková | 4 | 6 | 6
(China) Zheng Qinwen | 6 | 4 | 4
7 | (United States) Jessica Pegula | 6 | 6
(Kazakhstan) Yulia Putintseva | 3 | 3
10 | (United States) Coco Gauff | 4 | 6^{2}
15 | (Romania) Simona Halep | 6 | 7^{7}

Semifinals
(Brazil) Beatriz Haddad Maia | 6 | 7^{9}
14 | (Czech Republic) Karolína Plíšková | 4 | 6^{7}
7 | (United States) Jessica Pegula | 6 | 3 | 4
15 | (Romania) Simona Halep | 2 | 6 | 6

Final
(Brazil) Beatriz Haddad Maia | 3 | 6 | 3
15 | (Romania) Simona Halep | 6 | 2 | 6

==== Doubles ====
Semifinals
(United States) Madison Keys (India) Sania Mirza | 5 | 5
3 | (United States) Coco Gauff (United States) Jessica Pegula | 7 | 7
(United States) Nicole Melichar-Martinez (Australia) Ellen Perez | 7^{7} | 6
2 | (Canada) Gabriela Dabrowski (Mexico) Giuliana Olmos | 6^{5} | 3

Final
3 | (United States) Coco Gauff (United States) Jessica Pegula | 6 | 6^{5} | [10]
(United States) Nicole Melichar-Martinez (Australia) Ellen Perez | 4 | 7^{7} | [5]

=== Western & Southern Open ===
==== Singles ====
Quarterfinals
(United States) Madison Keys | 6 | 6
(Kazakhstan) Elena Rybakina | 2 | 4
Q | (Australia) Ajla Tomljanović | 2 | 3
(Czech Republic) Petra Kvitová | 6 | 6
7 | (United States) Jessica Pegula | 1 | 5
Q | (France) Caroline Garcia | 6 | 7
6 | (Belarus) Aryna Sabalenka | 6 | 7^{7}
(China) Zhang Shuai | 4 | 6^{1}

Semifinals
(United States) Madison Keys | 7^{8} | 4 | 3
(Czech Republic) Petra Kvitová | 6^{6} | 6 | 6
Q | (France) Caroline Garcia | 6 | 4 | 6
6 | (Belarus) Aryna Sabalenka | 2 | 6 | 1

Final
(Czech Republic) Petra Kvitová | 2 | 4
Q | (France) Caroline Garcia | 6 | 6

==== Doubles ====
Semifinals
1 | (Russia) Veronika Kudermetova (Belgium) Elise Mertens | 6 | 6^{5} | [5]
7 | (Ukraine) Lyudmyla Kichenok (Latvia) Jeļena Ostapenko | 4 | 7^{7} | [10]
6 | (United States) Desirae Krawczyk (Netherlands) Demi Schuurs | 5 | 4
(United States) Nicole Melichar-Martinez (Australia) Ellen Perez | 7 | 6

Final
7 | (Ukraine) Lyudmyla Kichenok (Latvia) Jeļena Ostapenko | 7^{7} | 6
(United States) Nicole Melichar-Martinez (Australia) Ellen Perez | 6^{5} | 3

=== Guadalajara Open ===
==== Singles ====
Quarterfinals
(Belarus) Victoria Azarenka | 7^{7} | 4 | 6
5 | (United States) Coco Gauff | 6^{2} | 6 | 3
3 | (United States) Jessica Pegula | 6 | 6
(United States) Sloane Stephens | 2 | 2
8 | (Russia) Veronika Kudermetova | 1 | 7 | 4
4 | (Greece) Maria Sakkari | 6 | 5 | 6
(Russia) Anna Kalinskaya | 2^{r}
(Czech Republic) Marie Bouzková | 5

Semifinals
(Belarus) Victoria Azarenka | 6^{3} | 1
3 | (United States) Jessica Pegula | 7^{7} | 6
4 | (Greece) Maria Sakkari | 7 | 6
(Czech Republic) Marie Bouzková | 5 | 4

Final
3 | (United States) Jessica Pegula | 6 | 6
4 | (Greece) Maria Sakkari | 2 | 3

==== Doubles ====
Semifinals
1 | (Czech Republic) Barbora Krejčíková (Czech Republic) Kateřina Siniaková | 2 | 7 | [7]
(Kazakhstan) Anna Danilina (Brazil) Beatriz Haddad Maia | 6 | 5 | [10]
8 | (China) Xu Yifan (China) Yang Zhaoxuan | 7 | 4 | [6]
(Australia) Storm Sanders (Brazil) Luisa Stefani | 5 | 6 | [10]

Final
(Kazakhstan) Anna Danilina (Brazil) Beatriz Haddad Maia | 6^{4} | 7^{7} | [8]
(Australia) Storm Sanders (Brazil) Luisa Stefani | 7^{7} | 6^{2} | [10]

== See also ==
- WTA 1000 tournaments
- 2022 WTA Tour
- 2022 ATP Tour Masters 1000
- 2022 ATP Tour
