= 2022 ATP Masters 1000 tournaments =

Men's professional tennis tour

2022 ATP Masters 1000
Details
- Duration: March 10 – November 6
- Edition: 33rd
- Tournaments: 8

Achievements (singles)
- Most titles: (Spain) Carlos Alcaraz (2)
- Most finals: (Greece) Stefanos Tsitsipas (3)

The 2022 ATP Masters 1000 season is the thirty-third edition of the ATP Masters Series of tennis tournaments. The champion of each ATP 1000 event is awarded 1,000 rankings points.

== Tournaments ==
Tournament	Country	Location	Surface	Date	Prize money
Indian Wells Open	USA	Indian Wells, California	Hard	Mar 10 – 20	$9,554,920
Miami Open	USA	Miami Gardens, Florida	Hard	Mar 23 – Apr 3	$9,554,920
Monte-Carlo Masters	France	Roquebrune-Cap-Martin	Clay	Apr 10 – 17	€5,802,475
Madrid Open	Spain	Madrid	Clay	May 1 – 8	€7,499,290
Italian Open	Italy	Rome	Clay	May 8 – 15	€6,008,725
Canadian Open	Canada	Toronto	Hard	Aug 7 – 14	$6,573,785
Cincinnati Open	USA	Mason, Ohio	Hard	Aug 14 – 21	$6,971,275
Shanghai Masters	China	Shanghai	Not held due to the ongoing restrictions related to the COVID-19 pandemic.		
Paris Masters	France	Paris	Hard (indoor)	Oct 31 – Nov 6	€6,008,725

== Results ==
* First-time champion

Masters	Singles champions	Runners-up	Score	Doubles champions	Runners-up	Score
Indian Wells Open Singles – Doubles	(United States) Taylor Fritz*	(Spain) Rafael Nadal	6–3, 7–6^{(7–5)}	(United States) John Isner (United States) Jack Sock	(Mexico) Santiago González (France) Édouard Roger-Vasselin	7–6^{(7–4)}, 6–3
Miami Open Singles – Doubles	(Spain) Carlos Alcaraz*	(Norway) Casper Ruud	7–5, 6–4	(Poland) Hubert Hurkacz (United States) John Isner	(Netherlands) Wesley Koolhof (United Kingdom) Neal Skupski	7–6^{(7–5)}, 6–4
Monte-Carlo Masters Singles – Doubles	(Greece) Stefanos Tsitsipas	(Spain) Alejandro Davidovich Fokina	6–3, 7–6^{(7–3)}	(United States) Rajeev Ram (United Kingdom) Joe Salisbury	(Colombia) Juan Sebastián Cabal (Colombia) Robert Farah	6–4, 3–6, [10–7]
Madrid Open Singles – Doubles	(Spain) Carlos Alcaraz	(Germany) Alexander Zverev	6–3, 6–1	(Netherlands) Wesley Koolhof* (United Kingdom) Neal Skupski*	(Colombia) Juan Sebastián Cabal (Colombia) Robert Farah	7–6^{(7–4)}, 4–6, [10–5]
Italian Open Singles – Doubles	(Serbia) Novak Djokovic	(Greece) Stefanos Tsitsipas	6–0, 7–6^{(7–5)}	(Croatia) Nikola Mektić (Croatia) Mate Pavić	(United States) John Isner (Argentina) Diego Schwartzman	6–2, 6–7^{(6–8)}, [12–10]
Canadian Open Singles – Doubles	(Spain) Pablo Carreño Busta*	(Poland) Hubert Hurkacz	3–6, 6–3, 6–3	(Netherlands) Wesley Koolhof (United Kingdom) Neal Skupski	(United Kingdom) Dan Evans (Australia) John Peers	6–2, 4–6, [10–6]
Cincinnati Open Singles – Doubles	(Croatia) Borna Ćorić*	(Greece) Stefanos Tsitsipas	7–6^{(7–0)}, 6–2	(United States) Rajeev Ram (United Kingdom) Joe Salisbury	(Germany) Tim Pütz (New Zealand) Michael Venus	7–6^{(7–4)}, 7–6^{(7–5)}
Shanghai Masters	Not held due to the COVID-19 pandemic.					
Paris Masters Singles – Doubles	(Denmark) Holger Rune*	(Serbia) Novak Djokovic	3–6, 6–3, 7–5	(Netherlands) Wesley Koolhof (United Kingdom) Neal Skupski	(Croatia) Ivan Dodig (United States) Austin Krajicek	7–6^{(7–5)}, 6–4

== Tournament details ==
Key

- Q = Qualifier
- WC = Wild card
- LL = Lucky loser
- Alt = Alternate
- ITF = ITF entry
- PR = Protected ranking
- SR = Special ranking
- SE = Special exempt
- JE = Junior exempt
- JR = Junior Accelerator Programme entrant
- CO = College Accelerator Programme entrant
- NG = Next Gen Accelerator Program entrant
- w/o = Walkover
- r = Retired
- d = Defaulted

=== Indian Wells Open ===
==== Singles ====
Quarterfinals
19	(Spain) Carlos Alcaraz	6	6
12	(United Kingdom) Cameron Norrie	4	3
4	(Spain) Rafael Nadal	7^{7}	5	6
WC	(Australia) Nick Kyrgios	6^{0}	7	4
(Serbia) Miomir Kecmanović	6^{5}	6	1
20	(United States) Taylor Fritz	7^{7}	3	6
7	Andrey Rublev	7	6
33	(Bulgaria) Grigor Dimitrov	5	2

Semifinals
19	(Spain) Carlos Alcaraz	4	6	3
4	(Spain) Rafael Nadal	6	4	6
20	(United States) Taylor Fritz	7	6
7	Andrey Rublev	5	4

Final
4	(Spain) Rafael Nadal	3	6^{5}
20	(United States) Taylor Fritz	6	7^{7}

==== Doubles ====
Semifinals
WC	(United States) John Isner (United States) Jack Sock	6	6
(Kazakhstan) Andrey Golubev (Germany) Alexander Zverev	3	2
PR	(Mexico) Santiago González (France) Édouard Roger-Vasselin	3	6	[10]
2	(United States) Rajeev Ram (United Kingdom) Joe Salisbury	6	4	[7]

Final
WC	(United States) John Isner (United States) Jack Sock	7^{7}	6
PR	(Mexico) Santiago González (France) Édouard Roger-Vasselin	6^{4}	3

=== Miami Open ===
==== Singles ====
Quarterfinals
1	Daniil Medvedev	6^{7}	3
8	(Poland) Hubert Hurkacz	7^{9}	6
14	(Spain) Carlos Alcaraz	6^{5}	6	7^{7}
(Serbia) Miomir Kecmanović	7^{7}	3	6^{5}
9	(Italy) Jannik Sinner	1^{r}
(Argentina) Francisco Cerúndolo	4
6	(Norway) Casper Ruud	6	1	6
2	(Germany) Alexander Zverev	3	6	3

Semifinals
8	(Poland) Hubert Hurkacz	6^{5}	6^{2}
14	(Spain) Carlos Alcaraz	7^{7}	7^{7}
(Argentina) Francisco Cerúndolo	4	1
6	(Norway) Casper Ruud	6	6

Final
14	(Spain) Carlos Alcaraz	7	6
6	(Norway) Casper Ruud	5	4

==== Doubles ====
Semifinals
6	(Netherlands) Wesley Koolhof (United Kingdom) Neal Skupski	6	3	[10]
(Italy) Simone Bolelli (Italy) Fabio Fognini	1	6	[5]
WC	(Australia) Thanasi Kokkinakis (Australia) Nick Kyrgios	4	3
WC	(Poland) Hubert Hurkacz (United States) John Isner	6	6

Final
6	(Netherlands) Wesley Koolhof (United Kingdom) Neal Skupski	6^{5}	4
WC	(Poland) Hubert Hurkacz (United States) John Isner	7^{7}	6

=== Monte-Carlo Masters ===
==== Singles ====
Quarterfinals
(Spain) Alejandro Davidovich Fokina	2	6	6
10	(United States) Taylor Fritz	6	4	3
(Bulgaria) Grigor Dimitrov	6	3	7^{7}
11	(Poland) Hubert Hurkacz	4	6	6^{2}
12	(Argentina) Diego Schwartzman	2	7^{7}	4
3	(Greece) Stefanos Tsitsipas	6	6^{3}	6
9	(Italy) Jannik Sinner	7	3	6^{5}
2	(Germany) Alexander Zverev	5	6	7^{7}

Semifinals
(Spain) Alejandro Davidovich Fokina	6	6^{2}	6
(Bulgaria) Grigor Dimitrov	4	7^{7}	3
3	(Greece) Stefanos Tsitsipas	6	6
2	(Germany) Alexander Zverev	4	2

Final
(Spain) Alejandro Davidovich Fokina	3	6^{3}
3	(Greece) Stefanos Tsitsipas	6	7^{7}

==== Doubles ====
Semifinals
1	(United States) Rajeev Ram (United Kingdom) Joe Salisbury	3	7^{7}	[11]
(India) Rohan Bopanna (United Kingdom) Jamie Murray	6	6^{4}	[9]
8	(El Salvador) Marcelo Arévalo (Netherlands) Jean-Julien Rojer	5	3
6	(Colombia) Juan Sebastián Cabal (Colombia) Robert Farah	7	6

Final
1	(United States) Rajeev Ram (United Kingdom) Joe Salisbury	6	3	[10]
6	(Colombia) Juan Sebastián Cabal (Colombia) Robert Farah	4	6	[7]

=== Madrid Open ===
==== Singles ====
Quarterfinals
1	(Serbia) Novak Djokovic	6	6
12	(Poland) Hubert Hurkacz	3	4
3	(Spain) Rafael Nadal	2	6	3
7	(Spain) Carlos Alcaraz	6	1	6
6	Andrey Rublev	3	6	4
4	(Greece) Stefanos Tsitsipas	6	2	6
8	(Canada) Félix Auger-Aliassime	3	5
2	(Germany) Alexander Zverev	6	7

Semifinals
1	(Serbia) Novak Djokovic	7^{7}	5	6^{5}
7	(Spain) Carlos Alcaraz	6^{5}	7	7^{7}
4	(Greece) Stefanos Tsitsipas	4	6	2
2	(Germany) Alexander Zverev	6	3	6

Final
7	(Spain) Carlos Alcaraz	6	6
2	(Germany) Alexander Zverev	3	1

==== Doubles ====
Semifinals
(Poland) Hubert Hurkacz (United States) John Isner	6^{7}	5
7	(Netherlands) Wesley Koolhof (United Kingdom) Neal Skupski	7^{9}	7
8	(United Kingdom) Jamie Murray (New Zealand) Michael Venus	6^{3}	3
5	(Colombia) Juan Sebastián Cabal (Colombia) Robert Farah	7^{7}	6

Final
7	(Netherlands) Wesley Koolhof (United Kingdom) Neal Skupski	6^{4}	6	[10]
5	(Colombia) Juan Sebastián Cabal (Colombia) Robert Farah	7^{7}	4	[5]

=== Italian Open ===
==== Singles ====
Quarterfinals
1	(Serbia) Novak Djokovic	7	7^{7}
8	(Canada) Félix Auger-Aliassime	5	6^{1}
13	(Canada) Denis Shapovalov	6^{7}	5
5	(Norway) Casper Ruud	7^{9}	7
10	(Italy) Jannik Sinner	6^{5}	2
4	(Greece) Stefanos Tsitsipas	7^{7}	6
(Chile) Cristian Garín	5	2
2	(Germany) Alexander Zverev	7	6

Semifinals
1	(Serbia) Novak Djokovic	6	6
5	(Norway) Casper Ruud	4	3
4	(Greece) Stefanos Tsitsipas	4	6	6
2	(Germany) Alexander Zverev	6	3	3

Final
1	(Serbia) Novak Djokovic	6	7^{7}
4	(Greece) Stefanos Tsitsipas	0	6^{5}

==== Doubles ====
Semifinals
(United States) John Isner (Argentina) Diego Schwartzman	6	4	[11]
(Kazakhstan) Andrey Golubev (Argentina) Máximo González	4	6	[9]
3	(Croatia) Nikola Mektić (Croatia) Mate Pavić	6	7^{7}
(Italy) Simone Bolelli (Italy) Fabio Fognini	3	6^{5}

Final
(United States) John Isner (Argentina) Diego Schwartzman	2	7^{8}	[10]
3	(Croatia) Nikola Mektić (Croatia) Mate Pavić	6	6^{6}	[12]

=== Canadian Open ===
==== Singles ====
Quarterfinals
(Australia) Nick Kyrgios	6^{4}	7^{7}	1
8	(Poland) Hubert Hurkacz	7^{7}	6^{5}	6
4	(Norway) Casper Ruud	6	6
6	(Canada) Félix Auger-Aliassime	1	2
(Spain) Pablo Carreño Busta	7^{7}	6
Q	(United Kingdom) Jack Draper	6^{4}	1
(United Kingdom) Dan Evans	1	6	6
(United States) Tommy Paul	6	3	4

Semifinals
8	(Poland) Hubert Hurkacz	5	6	6
4	(Norway) Casper Ruud	7	3	2
(Spain) Pablo Carreño Busta	7	6^{7}	6
(United Kingdom) Dan Evans	5	7^{9}	2

Final
8	(Poland) Hubert Hurkacz	6	3	3
(Spain) Pablo Carreño Busta	3	6	6

==== Doubles ====
Semifinals
(Germany) Kevin Krawietz (Germany) Andreas Mies	6	2	[8]
3	(Netherlands) Wesley Koolhof (United Kingdom) Neal Skupski	3	6	[10]
(Poland) Hubert Hurkacz (Poland) Jan Zieliński	5	6	[4]
(United Kingdom) Dan Evans (Australia) John Peers	7	4	[10]

Final
3	(Netherlands) Wesley Koolhof (United Kingdom) Neal Skupski	6	4	[10]
(United Kingdom) Dan Evans (Australia) John Peers	2	6	[6]

=== Cincinnati Open ===
==== Singles ====
Quarterfinals
1	Daniil Medvedev	7^{7}	6
11	(United States) Taylor Fritz	6^{1}	3
4	(Greece) Stefanos Tsitsipas	7^{7}	5	6
(United States) John Isner	6^{5}	7	3
9	(United Kingdom) Cameron Norrie	7^{7}	6^{4}	6
3	(Spain) Carlos Alcaraz	6^{4}	7^{7}	4
7	(Canada) Félix Auger-Aliassime	4	4
PR	(Croatia) Borna Ćorić	6	6

Semifinals
1	Daniil Medvedev	6^{6}	6	3
4	(Greece) Stefanos Tsitsipas	7^{8}	3	6
9	(United Kingdom) Cameron Norrie	3	4
PR	(Croatia) Borna Ćorić	6	6

Final
4	(Greece) Stefanos Tsitsipas	6^{0}	2
PR	(Croatia) Borna Ćorić	7^{7}	6

==== Doubles ====
Semifinals
1	(United States) Rajeev Ram (United Kingdom) Joe Salisbury	6	7
PR	(Mexico) Santiago González (France) Édouard Roger-Vasselin	4	5
WC	(Denmark) Holger Rune (Greece) Stefanos Tsitsipas
6	(Germany) Tim Pütz (New Zealand) Michael Venus	w/o

Final
1	(United States) Rajeev Ram (United Kingdom) Joe Salisbury	7^{7}	7^{7}
6	(Germany) Tim Pütz (New Zealand) Michael Venus	6^{4}	6^{5}

=== Paris Masters ===
==== Singles ====
Quarterfinals
1	(Spain) Carlos Alcaraz	3	6^{r}
(Denmark) Holger Rune	6	6
16	(United States) Frances Tiafoe	1	4
8	(Canada) Félix Auger-Aliassime	6	6
6	(Serbia) Novak Djokovic	6	6
(Italy) Lorenzo Musetti	0	3
5	(Greece) Stefanos Tsitsipas	6	6
(United States) Tommy Paul	2	4

Semifinals
(Denmark) Holger Rune	6	6
8	(Canada) Félix Auger-Aliassime	4	2
6	(Serbia) Novak Djokovic	6	3	7^{7}
5	(Greece) Stefanos Tsitsipas	2	6	6^{4}

Final
(Denmark) Holger Rune	3	6	7
6	(Serbia) Novak Djokovic	6	3	5

==== Doubles ====
Semifinals
8	(Croatia) Ivan Dodig (United States) Austin Krajicek	6	6
(Germany) Kevin Krawietz (Germany) Andreas Mies	3	4
7	(United Kingdom) Lloyd Glasspool (Finland) Harri Heliövaara	1	7^{7}	[6]
2	(Netherlands) Wesley Koolhof (United Kingdom) Neal Skupski	6	6^{4}	[10]

Final
8	(Croatia) Ivan Dodig (United States) Austin Krajicek	6^{5}	4
2	(Netherlands) Wesley Koolhof (United Kingdom) Neal Skupski	7^{7}	6

== See also ==
- ATP Masters 1000 tournaments
- 2022 ATP Tour
- 2022 WTA 1000 tournaments
- 2022 WTA Tour
