= 2022 Masters =

2022 Masters may refer to:

- 2022 Masters Tournament, the 86th edition of The Masters golf tournament, held at Augusta National Golf Club in Georgia, United States
- 2022 Masters (curling), a Grand Slam of Curling event held during the 2022–23 curling season
- 2022 Masters (darts), the 10th staging of the professional darts tournament held by the Professional Darts Corporation
- 2022 Masters (snooker), the 48th edition of the professional invitational snooker tournament held in London, England
- 2022 ATP Masters 1000 tournaments, series of nine top-tier men’s tennis tournaments held during the 2022 season

== See also ==
- Masters (disambiguation)
