= 2022 Italian Open – Women's doubles =

Women's doubles
- 2022 Italian Open

Final
- Champions: Veronika Kudermetova; Anastasia Pavlyuchenkova
- Runners-up: (Canada) Gabriela Dabrowski (Mexico) Giuliana Olmos
- Score: 1–6, 6–4, [10–7]

Details
- Draw: 28
- Seeds: 8

Events
Singles	men	women
Doubles	men	women
← 2021 ·	Italian Open	· 2023 →

Veronika Kudermetova and Anastasia Pavlyuchenkova defeated the defending champion Giuliana Olmos and her partner Gabriela Dabrowski in the final, 1–6, 6–4, [10–7] to win the women's doubles tennis title at the 2022 Italian Open.

Sharon Fichman and Olmos were the reigning champions, but Fichman could not defend her title due to injury.

== Seeds ==
1. (Australia) Storm Sanders / (China) Zhang Shuai (quarterfinals)
2. (Canada) Gabriela Dabrowski / (Mexico) Giuliana Olmos (final)
3. (United States) Desirae Krawczyk / (Netherlands) Demi Schuurs (semifinals)
4. (Chile) Alexa Guarachi / (Slovenia) Andreja Klepač (quarterfinals)
5. (United States) Coco Gauff / (United States) Jessica Pegula (first round)
6. (Czech Republic) Lucie Hradecká / (India) Sania Mirza (semifinals)
7. (China) Xu Yifan / (China) Yang Zhaoxuan (quarterfinals)
8. (Japan) Shuko Aoyama / (Chinese Taipei) Chan Hao-ching (quarterfinals)

== Draw ==
=== Key ===
- Q = Qualifier
- WC = Wild card
- LL = Lucky loser
- Alt = Alternate
- ITF = ITF entry
- PR = Protected ranking
- SR = Special ranking
- SE = Special exempt
- JE = Junior exempt
- JR = Junior Accelerator Programme entrant
- CO = College Accelerator Programme entrant
- NG = Next Gen Accelerator Program entrant
- w/o = Walkover
- r = Retired
- d = Defaulted

=== Finals ===
Semifinals
Veronika Kudermetova; Anastasia Pavlyuchenkova	1	7^{8}	[10]
3	(United States) Desirae Krawczyk (Netherlands) Demi Schuurs	6	6^{6}	[7]
6	(Czech Republic) Lucie Hradecká (India) Sania Mirza	1	2
2	(Canada) Gabriela Dabrowski (Mexico) Giuliana Olmos	6	6

Final
Veronika Kudermetova; Anastasia Pavlyuchenkova	1	6	[10]
2	(Canada) Gabriela Dabrowski (Mexico) Giuliana Olmos	6	4	[7]

=== Top half ===
First round
(Romania) M Niculescu; A Panova	6	0	[7]
(Japan) E Hozumi (Japan) M Ninomiya	3	6	[10]
(Ukraine) M Kostyuk (Romania) E-G Ruse	6	6
(Norway) U Eikeri (United States) C Harrison	0	2
V Kudermetova; A Pavlyuchenkova	5	6	[11]
5	(United States) C Gauff (United States) J Pegula	7	2	[9]
(United States) N Melichar-Martinez (Australia) E Perez	6	6
(Switzerland) V Golubic (Switzerland) J Teichmann	3	4
WC	(Italy) J Paolini (Italy) M Trevisan	6	7^{7}
(Germany) V Heisen (United States) S Santamaria	2	6^{4}
Alt	(United States) M Brengle (Australia) Ar Rodionova	7	2	[2]
7	(China) Y Xu (China) Z Yang	5	6	[10]

Second round
1	(Australia) S Sanders (China) S Zhang	6	6
(Japan) E Hozumi (Japan) M Ninomiya	3	2
(Ukraine) M Kostyuk (Romania) E-G Ruse	1	0^{r}
V Kudermetova; A Pavlyuchenkova	6	0
3	(United States) D Krawczyk (Netherlands) D Schuurs	5	7^{7}	[10]
(United States) N Melichar-Martinez (Australia) E Perez	7	6^{5}	[7]
WC	(Italy) J Paolini (Italy) M Trevisan	3	3
7	(China) Y Xu (China) Z Yang	6	6

Quarterfinals
1	(Australia) S Sanders (China) S Zhang	6^{4}	3
V Kudermetova; A Pavlyuchenkova	7^{7}	6
3	(United States) D Krawczyk (Netherlands) D Schuurs	6	6
7	(China) Y Xu (China) Z Yang	4	2

Semifinals
V Kudermetova; A Pavlyuchenkova	1	7^{8}	[10]
3	(United States) D Krawczyk (Netherlands) D Schuurs	6	6^{6}	[7]

=== Bottom half ===
First round
6	(Czech Republic) L Hradecká (India) S Mirza	6	6
(Poland) A Rosolska (New Zealand) E Routliffe	1	2
(Belgium) K Flipkens (Spain) S Sorribes Tormo	4	6	[9]
(Kazakhstan) E Rybakina; L Samsonova	6	2	[11]
N Dzalamidze; L Marozava	6^{9}	3
PR	(United States) K Christian (China) X Han	7^{11}	6
8	(Japan) S Aoyama (Chinese Taipei) H-c Chan	7^{7}	0	[10]
(Ukraine) N Kichenok (United States) S Rogers	6^{3}	6	[5]
(United States) D Collins (Kazakhstan) Y Putintseva	3	2
(Latvia) J Ostapenko (Czech Republic) Ka Plíšková	6	6
WC	(Italy) C Giovine (Italy) A Grymalska	3	4
E Alexandrova (Kazakhstan) A Danilina	6	6

Second round
6	(Czech Republic) L Hradecká (India) S Mirza	w/o
(Kazakhstan) E Rybakina; L Samsonova
PR	(United States) K Christian (China) X Han	0	3
4	(Chile) A Guarachi (Slovenia) A Klepač	6	6
8	(Japan) S Aoyama (Chinese Taipei) H-c Chan	6	5	[10]
(Latvia) J Ostapenko (Czech Republic) Ka Plíšková	3	7	[7]
E Alexandrova (Kazakhstan) A Danilina	5	6	[7]
2	(Canada) G Dabrowski (Mexico) G Olmos	7	3	[10]

Quarterfinals
6	(Czech Republic) L Hradecká (India) S Mirza	6	4	[10]
4	(Chile) A Guarachi (Slovenia) A Klepač	4	6	[8]
8	(Japan) S Aoyama (Chinese Taipei) H-c Chan	5	6	[5]
2	(Canada) G Dabrowski (Mexico) G Olmos	7	2	[10]

Semifinals
6	(Czech Republic) L Hradecká (India) S Mirza	1	2
2	(Canada) G Dabrowski (Mexico) G Olmos	6	6

== Seeded teams ==
The following are the seeded teams, based on WTA rankings as of April 25, 2022.

Country	Player	Country	Player	Rank^{1}	Seed
AUS	Storm Sanders	CHN	Zhang Shuai	22	1
CAN	Gabriela Dabrowski	MEX	Giuliana Olmos	29	2
USA	Desirae Krawczyk	NED	Demi Schuurs	33	3
CHI	Alexa Guarachi	SLO	Andreja Klepač	35	4
USA	Coco Gauff	USA	Jessica Pegula	41	5
CZE	Lucie Hradecká	IND	Sania Mirza	50	6
CHN	Xu Yifan	CHN	Yang Zhaoxuan	59	7
JPN	Shuko Aoyama	TPE	Chan Hao-ching	61	8

== Other entry information ==
=== Wildcards ===
- (Italy) Claudia Giovine / (Italy) Anastasia Grymalska
- (Italy) Jasmine Paolini / (Italy) Martina Trevisan

=== Protected ranking ===
- (United States) Kaitlyn Christian / (China) Han Xinyun

=== Alternates ===
- (United States) Madison Brengle / (Australia) Arina Rodionova

=== Withdrawals ===
Before the tournament

- (Romania) Irina-Camelia Begu / (United States) Shelby Rogers → replaced by (Ukraine) Nadiia Kichenok / (United States) Shelby Rogers
- (Ukraine) Lyudmyla Kichenok / (Latvia) Jeļena Ostapenko → replaced by Ekaterina Alexandrova / (Kazakhstan) Anna Danilina
- (Ukraine) Nadiia Kichenok / (Romania) Raluca Olaru → replaced by (Belgium) Kirsten Flipkens / (Spain) Sara Sorribes Tormo
- Veronika Kudermetova / (Belgium) Elise Mertens → replaced by (Ukraine) Marta Kostyuk / (Romania) Elena-Gabriela Ruse
- (Czech Republic) Tereza Martincová / Aliaksandra Sasnovich → replaced by (United States) Madison Brengle / (Australia) Arina Rodionova
