= 2022 Italian Open – Women's singles =

Women's singles
- 2022 Italian Open

Final
- Champion: (Poland) Iga Świątek
- Runner-up: (Tunisia) Ons Jabeur
- Score: 6–2, 6–2

Details
- Draw: 56
- Seeds: 16

Events
Singles	men	women
Doubles	men	women
← 2021 ·	Italian Open	· 2023 →

Defending champion Iga Świątek defeated Ons Jabeur in the final, 6–2, 6–2 to win the women's singles tennis title at the 2022 Italian Open. She did not drop a set during the tournament, and was the first player to win the title in Rome without dropping a set since Serena Williams in 2016. This was Świątek's fifth consecutive WTA Tour title, and she became the first player to win four WTA 1000 titles in a single season since Serena Williams in 2013. With the win, Świątek extended her winning streak to 28 matches – the longest on the WTA Tour since Serena Williams won 34 consecutive matches in 2013. This was also the first time in her professional career that Świątek defended a title. Jabeur was attempting to be the first player since Serena Williams in 2013 to win consecutive titles in Madrid and Rome; she reached the final after saving a match point in her semifinal match against Daria Kasatkina.

== Seeds ==
The top eight seeds received a bye into the second round.

1. (Poland) Iga Świątek (champion)
2. (Spain) Paula Badosa (third round)
3. Aryna Sabalenka (semifinals)
4. (Greece) Maria Sakkari (quarterfinals)
5. (Estonia) Anett Kontaveit (second round)
6. (Czech Republic) Karolína Plíšková (second round)
7. (United States) Danielle Collins (third round)
8. (Spain) Garbiñe Muguruza (second round)

9. (Tunisia) Ons Jabeur (final)
10. (United Kingdom) Emma Raducanu (first round, retired)
11. (Latvia) Jeļena Ostapenko (first round)
12. (Switzerland) Belinda Bencic (second round)
13. (United States) Jessica Pegula (third round)
14. Anastasia Pavlyuchenkova (first round)
15. (United States) Coco Gauff (third round)
16. Victoria Azarenka (third round)

Click on the seed number of a player to go to their draw section.

== Draw ==
=== Key ===
- Q = Qualifier
- WC = Wild card
- LL = Lucky loser
- Alt = Alternate
- ITF = ITF entry
- PR = Protected ranking
- SR = Special ranking
- SE = Special exempt
- JE = Junior exempt
- JR = Junior Accelerator Programme entrant
- CO = College Accelerator Programme entrant
- NG = Next Gen Accelerator Program entrant
- w/o = Walkover
- r = Retired
- d = Defaulted

=== Finals ===
Quarterfinals
1	(Poland) Iga Świątek	7^{7}	6
PR	(Canada) Bianca Andreescu	6^{2}	0
3	Aryna Sabalenka	4	6	6
(United States) Amanda Anisimova	6	3	2
9	(Tunisia) Ons Jabeur	1	7	6
4	(Greece) Maria Sakkari	6	5	1
(Switzerland) Jil Teichmann	4	2^{r}
Daria Kasatkina	6	3

Semifinals
1	(Poland) Iga Świątek	6	6
3	Aryna Sabalenka	2	1
9	(Tunisia) Ons Jabeur	6	1	7
Daria Kasatkina	4	6	5

Final
1	(Poland) Iga Świątek	6	6
9	(Tunisia) Ons Jabeur	2	2

=== Top half ===
==== Section 1 ====
First round
(United States) S Rogers	6	1	4
LL	(Romania) E-G Ruse	3	6	6
(Colombia) C Osorio	7^{7}	6
WC	(Italy) L Bronzetti	6^{4}	3
(Switzerland) V Golubic	3	0
16	V Azarenka	6	6
10	(United Kingdom) E Raducanu	2	1^{r}
PR	(Canada) B Andreescu	6	2
(Spain) S Sorribes Tormo	6	4^{r}
LL	(Spain) N Párrizas Díaz	1	3
Q	(Croatia) P Martić	6	3	6
PR	(Czech Republic) K Muchová	2	6	1

Second round
1	(Poland) I Świątek	6	6
LL	(Romania) E-G Ruse	3	0
(Colombia) C Osorio	2	4
16	V Azarenka	6	6
PR	(Canada) B Andreescu	6	7^{7}
LL	(Spain) N Párrizas Díaz	3	6^{4}
Q	(Croatia) P Martić	6	6
5	(Estonia) A Kontaveit	2	3

Third round
1	(Poland) I Świątek	6	6
16	V Azarenka	4	1
PR	(Canada) B Andreescu	6	6
Q	(Croatia) P Martić	4	4

Quarterfinals
1	(Poland) I Świątek	7^{7}	6
PR	(Canada) B Andreescu	6^{2}	0

==== Section 2 ====
First round
(China) S Zhang	6	6
WC	(Italy) M Trevisan	4	2
(Ukraine) A Kalinina	6	6
(United States) M Keys	4	4
L Samsonova	6	3	4
13	(United States) J Pegula	4	6	6
12	(Switzerland) B Bencic	6	6
WC	(Italy) E Cocciaretto	4	2
Q	(Czech Republic) T Martincová	2	6	4
(United States) A Anisimova	6	0	6
(France) A Cornet	4	4
(Romania) S Halep	6	6

Second round
3	A Sabalenka	6	6
(China) S Zhang	2	0
(Ukraine) A Kalinina
13	(United States) J Pegula	w/o
12	(Switzerland) B Bencic	6^{5}	1
(United States) A Anisimova	7^{7}	6
(Romania) S Halep	6^{1}	3
7	(United States) D Collins	7^{7}	6

Third round
3	A Sabalenka	6	6
13	(United States) J Pegula	1	4
(United States) A Anisimova	6	6
7	(United States) D Collins	2	2

Quarterfinals
3	A Sabalenka	4	6	6
(United States) A Anisimova	6	3	2

=== Bottom half ===
==== Section 3 ====
First round
Q	(Slovenia) K Juvan	5	6	5
Q	(Kazakhstan) Y Putintseva	7	4	7
(Italy) C Giorgi	3	2^{r}
(Australia) A Tomljanović	6	4
(Romania) S Cîrstea	0	6^{1}
9	(Tunisia) O Jabeur	6	7^{7}
15	(United States) C Gauff	6	6
(Germany) A Kerber	1	4
LL	(United States) M Brengle	6	6
Q	(Ukraine) M Kostyuk	4	3
(United States) S Stephens	1	2
E Alexandrova	6	6

Second round
8	(Spain) G Muguruza	6	6^{4}	1
Q	(Kazakhstan) Y Putintseva	3	7^{7}	6
(Australia) A Tomljanović	5	2
9	(Tunisia) O Jabeur	7	6
15	(United States) C Gauff	6	6
LL	(United States) M Brengle	2	4
E Alexandrova	3	2
4	(Greece) M Sakkari	6	6

Third round
Q	(Kazakhstan) Y Putintseva	3	2
9	(Tunisia) O Jabeur	6	6
15	(United States) C Gauff	4	5
4	(Greece) M Sakkari	6	7

Quarterfinals
9	(Tunisia) O Jabeur	1	7	6
4	(Greece) M Sakkari	6	5	1

==== Section 4 ====
First round
(Italy) J Paolini	3	2
(Switzerland) J Teichmann	6	6
(Kazakhstan) E Rybakina	6	7^{7}
Q	E Avanesyan	4	6^{0}
Q	(United States) L Davis	6	6
11	(Latvia) J Ostapenko	2	3
14	A Pavlyuchenkova	6	2	2
(Canada) L Fernandez	1	6	6
D Kasatkina	6	6
(Slovenia) T Zidanšek	4	3
Q	A Sasnovich	3	7^{7}	6
V Kudermetova	6	6^{4}	1

Second round
6	(Czech Republic) Ka Plíšková	2	6	4
(Switzerland) J Teichmann	6	4	6
(Kazakhstan) E Rybakina	6	6
Q	(United States) L Davis	4	3
(Canada) L Fernandez	6	3	6^{2}
D Kasatkina	4	6	7^{7}
Q	A Sasnovich	2	1
2	(Spain) P Badosa	6	6

Third round
(Switzerland) J Teichmann	6^{3}	6	7
(Kazakhstan) E Rybakina	7^{7}	3	5
D Kasatkina	6	6
2	(Spain) P Badosa	4	4

Quarterfinals
(Switzerland) J Teichmann	4	2^{r}
D Kasatkina	6	3

== Seeded players ==
The following are the seeded players, based on WTA rankings as of 25 April 2022. Rankings and points before are as of 9 May 2022.

Because Rome is a non-mandatory event, but players must count, if played, at least two non-mandatory WTA 1000 tournaments on their rankings, points will be adjusted the following way:

- Players who have points from the 2021 tournament counting towards their ranking, will get those points replaced by:
  - The points from the 2022 tournament, if they have less than two non-mandatory WTA 1000 events or 16 total tournaments counting towards their ranking.
  - The points from the 2022 tournament or their 17th best result, whichever is higher, if they have at least two non-mandatory WTA 1000 events counting towards their ranking.
- Players who don't have points from the 2021 tournament counting towards their ranking, will have their ranking adjusted the following way:
  - The points from the 2022 tournament will be added to the players counting less than 16 tournaments towards their ranking.
  - The points from the 2022 tournament will replace the 16th best result of the players counting less than two non-mandatory WTA 1000 towards their ranking.
  - The points from the 2022 tournament, if higher, will replace the points from the worse non-mandatory WTA 1000 event or the 16th best result, whichever is lower, of the players counting two non-mandatory WTA 1000 events towards their ranking.
  - The points from the 2022 tournament, if higher, will replace the 16th best result of the players counting more than two non-mandatory WTA 1000 events towards their ranking.

Seed	Rank	Player	Points before	Points defending (or 16th best result)^{†}	Points won (or 17th best result)	Points after	Status
1	1	(Poland) Iga Świątek	7,061	900	900	7,061	Champion, defeated (Tunisia) Ons Jabeur [9]
2	3	(Spain) Paula Badosa	4,720	(55)	105	4,770	Third round lost to Daria Kasatkina
3	8	Aryna Sabalenka	3,721	105	350	3,966	Semifinals lost to (Poland) Iga Świątek [1]
4	4	(Greece) Maria Sakkari	4,596	60	190	4,726	Quarterfinals lost to (Tunisia) Ons Jabeur [9]
5	5	(Estonia) Anett Kontaveit	4,446	(1)^{†}	1	4,446	Second round lost to (Croatia) Petra Martić [Q]
6	6	(Czech Republic) Karolína Plíšková	4,152	585	1	3,568	Second round lost to (Switzerland) Jil Teichmann
7	9	(United States) Danielle Collins	3,211	(1)^{†}	105	3,315	Third round lost to (United States) Amanda Anisimova
8	10	(Spain) Garbiñe Muguruza	3,135	105	1	3,031	Second round lost to (Kazakhstan) Yulia Putintseva [Q]
9	7	(Tunisia) Ons Jabeur	3,895	(100)	585	4,380	Runner-up, lost to (Poland) Iga Świątek [1]
10	12	(United Kingdom) Emma Raducanu	2,914	(5)	1	2,910	First round retired against (Canada) Bianca Andreescu [PR]
11	13	(Latvia) Jeļena Ostapenko	2,725	190	1	2,536	First round lost to (United States) Lauren Davis [Q]
12	14	(Switzerland) Belinda Bencic	2,466	1	60	2,525	Second round lost to (United States) Amanda Anisimova
13	11	(United States) Jessica Pegula	3,040	190	105	2,955	Third round lost to Aryna Sabalenka [3]
14	20	Anastasia Pavlyuchenkova	2,092	0	1	2,093	First round lost to (Canada) Leylah Fernandez
15	15	(United States) Coco Gauff	2,410	350	105	2,165	Third round lost to (Greece) Maria Sakkari [4]
16	16	Victoria Azarenka	2,336	(1)	105	2,440	Third round lost to (Poland) Iga Świątek [1]

† Points are from a non-mandatory WTA 1000 event that must count towards the player's ranking.

=== Withdrawn players ===
The following player would have been seeded, but withdrew before the tournament began.

Rank	Player	Points before	Points defending	Points added	Points after	Withdrawal reason
2	(Czech Republic) Barbora Krejčíková	5,011	105	5	4,911	Elbow injury

== Other entry information ==
=== Wildcards ===
- (Italy) Lucia Bronzetti
- (Italy) Elisabetta Cocciaretto
- (Italy) Martina Trevisan

=== Protected ranking ===
- (Canada) Bianca Andreescu
- (Czech Republic) Karolína Muchová

=== Withdrawals ===
- (Czech Republic) Barbora Krejčíková → replaced by (United States) Sloane Stephens
- (Czech Republic) Petra Kvitová → replaced by (Australia) Ajla Tomljanović
- (Belgium) Elise Mertens → replaced by (Colombia) Camila Osorio
- (Japan) Naomi Osaka → replaced by (Spain) Nuria Párrizas Díaz
- (United States) Alison Riske → replaced by (Romania) Elena-Gabriela Ruse
- (Ukraine) Elina Svitolina → replaced by (China) Zhang Shuai
- (Denmark) Clara Tauson → replaced by (United States) Madison Brengle
- (Czech Republic) Markéta Vondroušová → replaced by (United States) Shelby Rogers

== Qualifying ==
=== Seeds ===
1. (Kazakhstan) Yulia Putintseva (qualified)
2. (Czech Republic) Tereza Martincová (qualified)
3. Aliaksandra Sasnovich (qualified)
4. (Spain) Nuria Párrizas Díaz (qualifying competition, lucky loser)
5. (United States) Madison Brengle (qualifying competition, lucky loser)
6. (Romania) Elena-Gabriela Ruse (qualifying competition, retired, lucky loser)
7. (Croatia) Petra Martić (qualified)
8. (Ukraine) Marta Kostyuk (qualified)
9. (Germany) Andrea Petkovic (qualifying competition)
10. (Croatia) Ana Konjuh (qualifying competition)
11. (Slovenia) Kaja Juvan (qualified)
12. (Slovakia) Kristína Kučová (qualifying competition)
13. (United States) Lauren Davis (qualified)
14. (Japan) Misaki Doi (first round)
15. (Spain) Cristina Bucșa (qualifying competition)
16. Elina Avanesyan (qualified)

=== Qualifiers ===
1. (Kazakhstan) Yulia Putintseva
2. (Czech Republic) Tereza Martincová
3. Aliaksandra Sasnovich
4. (Slovenia) Kaja Juvan
5. Elina Avanesyan
6. (United States) Lauren Davis
7. (Croatia) Petra Martić
8. (Ukraine) Marta Kostyuk

=== Lucky losers ===
1. (Spain) Nuria Párrizas Díaz
2. (United States) Madison Brengle
3. (Romania) Elena-Gabriela Ruse

=== Draw ===
==== First qualifier ====
First round
1	(Kazakhstan) Yulia Putintseva	6	6
(Australia) Storm Sanders	1	1
(Australia) Arina Rodionova	2	6	2
10	(Croatia) Ana Konjuh	6	2	6

Qualifying competition
1	(Kazakhstan) Yulia Putintseva	4	6	6
10	(Croatia) Ana Konjuh	6	2	2

==== Second qualifier ====
First round
2	(Czech Republic) Tereza Martincová	6	4	6
PR	(China) Han Xinyun	0	6	3
(China) You Xiaodi	2	6	4
12	(Slovakia) Kristína Kučová	6	1	6

Qualifying competition
2	(Czech Republic) Tereza Martincová	6	6
12	(Slovakia) Kristína Kučová	3	4

==== Third qualifier ====
First round
3	Aliaksandra Sasnovich	6	6
WC	(Italy) Nuria Brancaccio	3	2
WC	(Italy) Angelica Raggi	4	6^{3}
9	(Germany) Andrea Petkovic	6	7^{7}

Qualifying competition
3	Aliaksandra Sasnovich	7	6
9	(Germany) Andrea Petkovic	5	0

==== Fourth qualifier ====
First round
4	(Spain) Nuria Párrizas Díaz	6	6
(Norway) Ulrikke Eikeri	3	1
WC	(Italy) Eleonora Alvisi	2	4
11	(Slovenia) Kaja Juvan	6	6

Qualifying competition
4	(Spain) Nuria Párrizas Díaz	6	6^{2}	4
11	(Slovenia) Kaja Juvan	1	7^{7}	6

==== Fifth qualifier ====
First round
5	(United States) Madison Brengle	6	6
(Argentina) Paula Ormaechea	1	1
(United States) Catherine Harrison	5	5
16	Elina Avanesyan	7	7

Qualifying competition
5	(United States) Madison Brengle	6	3	2
16	Elina Avanesyan	2	6	6

==== Sixth qualifier ====
First round
6	(Romania) Elena-Gabriela Ruse	6	6
(Bosnia and Herzegovina) Dea Herdželaš	4	2
WC	(Italy) Stefania Rubini	1	6	2
13	(United States) Lauren Davis	6	4	6

Qualifying competition
6	(Romania) Elena-Gabriela Ruse	1^{r}
13	(United States) Lauren Davis	5

==== Seventh qualifier ====
First round
7	(Croatia) Petra Martić	6	6
(Australia) Ellen Perez	2	0
(Switzerland) Susan Bandecchi	6	3	6
14	(Japan) Misaki Doi	4	6	3

Qualifying competition
7	(Croatia) Petra Martić	6	6
(Switzerland) Susan Bandecchi	4	3

==== Eighth qualifier ====
First round
8	(Ukraine) Marta Kostyuk	7^{7}	4
(Italy) Federica Di Sarra	6^{4}	0^{r}
Valeria Savinykh	1	2
15	(Spain) Cristina Bucșa	6	6

Qualifying competition
8	(Ukraine) Marta Kostyuk	6	5	6
15	(Spain) Cristina Bucșa	1	7	3
