= 2022 Italian Open – Men's doubles =

Men's doubles
- 2022 Italian Open

Final
- Champions: (Croatia) Nikola Mektić (Croatia) Mate Pavić
- Runners-up: (United States) John Isner (Argentina) Diego Schwartzman
- Score: 6–2, 6–7^{(6–8)}, [12–10]

Events
Singles	men	women
Doubles	men	women
- Italian Open

Defending champions Nikola Mektić and Mate Pavić defeated John Isner and Diego Schwartzman in the final, 6–2, 6–7^{(6–8)}, [12–10] to win the men's doubles tennis title at the 2022 Italian Open. The pair saved a championship point en route to their tenth career title as a team.

== Seeds ==
1. (United States) Rajeev Ram / (United Kingdom) Joe Salisbury (first round)
2. (Spain) Marcel Granollers / (Argentina) Horacio Zeballos (withdrew)
3. (Croatia) Nikola Mektić / (Croatia) Mate Pavić (champions)
4. (Australia) John Peers / (Slovakia) Filip Polášek (first round)
5. (Colombia) Juan Sebastián Cabal / (Colombia) Robert Farah (second round)
6. (United Kingdom) Jamie Murray / (New Zealand) Michael Venus (first round)
7. (Netherlands) Wesley Koolhof / (United Kingdom) Neal Skupski (quarterfinals)
8. (Germany) Kevin Krawietz / (Germany) Andreas Mies (quarterfinals)

== Draw ==
Key

- Q = Qualifier
- WC = Wild card
- LL = Lucky loser
- Alt = Alternate
- ITF = ITF entry
- PR = Protected ranking
- SR = Special ranking
- SE = Special exempt
- JE = Junior exempt
- JR = Junior Accelerator Programme entrant
- CO = College Accelerator Programme entrant
- NG = Next Gen Accelerator Program entrant
- w/o = Walkover
- r = Retired
- d = Defaulted

=== Finals ===
Semifinals
(United States) John Isner (Argentina) Diego Schwartzman	6	4	[11]
(Kazakhstan) Andrey Golubev (Argentina) Máximo González	4	6	[9]
3	(Croatia) Nikola Mektić (Croatia) Mate Pavić	6	7^{7}
(Italy) Simone Bolelli (Italy) Fabio Fognini	3	6^{5}

Final
(United States) John Isner (Argentina) Diego Schwartzman	2	7^{8}	[10]
3	(Croatia) Nikola Mektić (Croatia) Mate Pavić	6	6^{6}	[12]

=== Top half ===
First round
1	(United States) R Ram (United Kingdom) J Salisbury	6^{5}	3
Alt	(United Kingdom) L Glasspool (Finland) H Heliövaara	7^{7}	6
(Spain) P Martínez (United Kingdom) C Norrie	6	6^{2}	[8]
(Australia) T Kokkinakis (United States) F Tiafoe	2	7^{7}	[10]
(United States) J Isner (Argentina) D Schwartzman	5	6	[10]
(Mexico) S González (Argentina) A Molteni	7	3	[1]
(United States) R Opelka (United States) T Paul	3	3
5	(Colombia) JS Cabal (Colombia) R Farah	6	6
4	(Australia) J Peers (Slovakia) F Polášek	6	3	[8]
(Kazakhstan) A Golubev (Argentina) M González	3	6	[10]
(Australia) M Ebden (Australia) M Purcell	6	6
(Georgia (country)) N Basilashvili (Kazakhstan) A Bublik	4	1
(Belgium) S Gillé (Belgium) J Vliegen	4	6^{3}
(South Africa) R Klaasen (Japan) B McLachlan	6	7^{7}
(Uruguay) A Behar (Ecuador) G Escobar	6^{2}	6	[10]
6	(United Kingdom) J Murray (New Zealand) M Venus	7^{7}	3	[5]

Second round
Alt	(United Kingdom) L Glasspool (Finland) H Heliövaara	6	3	[10]
(Australia) T Kokkinakis (United States) F Tiafoe	3	6	[8]
(United States) J Isner (Argentina) D Schwartzman	6	3	[12]
5	(Colombia) JS Cabal (Colombia) R Farah	3	6	[10]
(Kazakhstan) A Golubev (Argentina) M González	6	6
(Australia) M Ebden (Australia) M Purcell	3	4
(South Africa) R Klaasen (Japan) B McLachlan	6^{5}	6^{3}
(Uruguay) A Behar (Ecuador) G Escobar	7^{7}	7^{7}

Quarterfinals
Alt	(United Kingdom) L Glasspool (Finland) H Heliövaara	3	2
(United States) J Isner (Argentina) D Schwartzman	6	6
(Kazakhstan) A Golubev (Argentina) M González	6	7^{12}
(Uruguay) A Behar (Ecuador) G Escobar	2	6^{10}

Semifinals
(United States) J Isner (Argentina) D Schwartzman	6	4	[11]
(Kazakhstan) A Golubev (Argentina) M González	4	6	[9]

=== Bottom half ===
First round
7	(Netherlands) W Koolhof (United Kingdom) N Skupski	6	7^{7}
(El Salvador) M Arévalo (Netherlands) J-J Rojer	4	6^{4}
(India) R Bopanna (Netherlands) M Middelkoop	6	6
(France) N Mahut (France) F Martin	3	4
(Croatia) I Dodig (United States) A Krajicek	6	6^{5}	[6]
(Bulgaria) G Dimitrov (Poland) H Hurkacz	2	7^{7}	[10]
PR	(Poland) Ł Kubot (France) É Roger-Vasselin	3	3
3	(Croatia) N Mektić (Croatia) M Pavić	6	6
8	(Germany) K Krawietz (Germany) A Mies	4	6	[10]
WC	(Italy) M Arnaldi (Italy) F Passaro	6	3	[8]
WC	(Italy) L Nardi (Italy) L Sonego	6	6^{7}	[10]
WC	(Italy) F Cobolli (Italy) F Forti	2	7^{9}	[4]
A Karatsev (Brazil) M Melo	2	6	[1]
(Italy) S Bolelli (Italy) F Fognini	6	4	[10]
(Bosnia and Herzegovina) T Brkić (Serbia) N Ćaćić	6	4	[10]
Alt	(Chile) J Peralta (Croatia) F Škugor	1	6	[12]

Second round
7	(Netherlands) W Koolhof (United Kingdom) N Skupski	7^{7}	6
(India) R Bopanna (Netherlands) M Middelkoop	6^{3}	3
(Bulgaria) G Dimitrov (Poland) H Hurkacz	5	5
3	(Croatia) N Mektić (Croatia) M Pavić	7	7
8	(Germany) K Krawietz (Germany) A Mies	6	6
WC	(Italy) L Nardi (Italy) L Sonego	3	3
(Italy) S Bolelli (Italy) F Fognini	w/o
Alt	(Chile) J Peralta (Croatia) F Škugor

Quarterfinals
7	(Netherlands) W Koolhof (United Kingdom) N Skupski	4	4
3	(Croatia) N Mektić (Croatia) M Pavić	6	6
8	(Germany) K Krawietz (Germany) A Mies	7^{7}	4	[9]
(Italy) S Bolelli (Italy) F Fognini	6^{3}	6	[11]

Semifinals
3	(Croatia) N Mektić (Croatia) M Pavić	6	7^{7}
(Italy) S Bolelli (Italy) F Fognini	3	6^{5}

== Seeded teams ==
The following are the seeded teams, based on ATP rankings as of 2 May 2022.

Country	Player	Country	Player	Rank^{1}	Seed
USA	Rajeev Ram	GBR	Joe Salisbury	3	1
~~ESP~~	~~Marcel Granollers~~	~~ARG~~	~~Horacio Zeballos~~	~~9~~	~~2~~
CRO	Nikola Mektić	CRO	Mate Pavić	9	3
AUS	John Peers	SVK	Filip Polášek	25	4
COL	Juan Sebastián Cabal	COL	Robert Farah	26	5
GBR	Jamie Murray	NZL	Michael Venus	27	6
NED	Wesley Koolhof	GBR	Neal Skupski	33	7
GER	Kevin Krawietz	GER	Andreas Mies	38	8

== Other entry information ==
=== Wildcards ===
- (Italy) Matteo Arnaldi / (Italy) Francesco Passaro
- (Italy) Flavio Cobolli / (Italy) Francesco Forti
- (Italy) Luca Nardi / (Italy) Lorenzo Sonego

=== Alternates ===
- (United Kingdom) Lloyd Glasspool / (Finland) Harri Heliövaara
- (Chile) Julio Peralta / (Croatia) Franko Škugor

=== Withdrawals ===
Before the tournament

- (Croatia) Marin Čilić / (Croatia) Ivan Dodig → replaced by (Croatia) Ivan Dodig / (United States) Austin Krajicek
- (United States) Taylor Fritz / (United States) Reilly Opelka → replaced by (United States) Reilly Opelka / (United States) Tommy Paul
- (Spain) Marcel Granollers / (Argentina) Horacio Zeballos → replaced by (Chile) Julio Peralta / (Croatia) Franko Škugor
- Karen Khachanov / Andrey Rublev → replaced by (United Kingdom) Lloyd Glasspool / (Finland) Harri Heliövaara
- (Brazil) Marcelo Melo / (Germany) Alexander Zverev → replaced by Aslan Karatsev / (Brazil) Marcelo Melo
