= 2022 Italian Open – Men's singles =

Men's singles
- 2022 Italian Open

Final
- Champion: (Serbia) Novak Djokovic
- Runner-up: (Greece) Stefanos Tsitsipas
- Score: 6–0, 7–6^{(7–5)}

Details
- Draw: 56 (7 Q / 4 WC )
- Seeds: 16

Events
Singles	men	women
Doubles	men	women
← 2021 ·	Italian Open	· 2023 →

Novak Djokovic defeated Stefanos Tsitsipas in the final, 6–0, 7–6^{(7–5)} to win the men's singles tennis title at the 2022 Italian Open. It was his sixth Italian Open title and record-extending 38th Masters 1000 title overall. Djokovic did not lose a set during the tournament, and won his 1000th ATP Tour-level career match against Casper Ruud in the semifinals.

Rafael Nadal was the defending champion, but lost in the third round to Denis Shapovalov. Despite Nadal’s early exit, Djokovic extended their streak, which started in 2004, to 18 consecutive years with either Nadal or himself in the Rome final.

Djokovic and Daniil Medvedev were in contention for the world No. 1 singles ranking. Djokovic retained the top position by reaching the semifinals.

== Seeds ==
The top eight seeds received a bye into the second round.

1. (Serbia) Novak Djokovic (champion)
2. (Germany) Alexander Zverev (semifinals)
3. (Spain) Rafael Nadal (third round)
4. (Greece) Stefanos Tsitsipas (final)
5. (Norway) Casper Ruud (semifinals)
6. Andrey Rublev (second round)
7. (Spain) Carlos Alcaraz (withdrew)
8. (Canada) Félix Auger-Aliassime (quarterfinals)
9. (United Kingdom) Cameron Norrie (second round)
10. (Italy) Jannik Sinner (quarterfinals)
11. (Poland) Hubert Hurkacz (first round)
12. (Argentina) Diego Schwartzman (second round)
13. (Canada) Denis Shapovalov (quarterfinals)
14. (United States) Reilly Opelka (first round)
15. (Spain) Pablo Carreño Busta (second round)
16. (Spain) Roberto Bautista Agut (withdrew)

Click on the seed number of a player to go to their draw section.

== Draw ==
=== Key ===
- Q = Qualifier
- WC = Wild card
- LL = Lucky loser
- Alt = Alternate
- ITF = ITF entry
- PR = Protected ranking
- SR = Special ranking
- SE = Special exempt
- JE = Junior exempt
- JR = Junior Accelerator Programme entrant
- CO = College Accelerator Programme entrant
- NG = Next Gen Accelerator Program entrant
- w/o = Walkover
- r = Retired
- d = Defaulted

=== Finals ===
Quarterfinals
1	(Serbia) Novak Djokovic	7	7^{7}
8	(Canada) Félix Auger-Aliassime	5	6^{1}
13	(Canada) Denis Shapovalov	6^{7}	5
5	(Norway) Casper Ruud	7^{9}	7
10	(Italy) Jannik Sinner	6^{5}	2
4	(Greece) Stefanos Tsitsipas	7^{7}	6
(Chile) Cristian Garín	5	2
2	(Germany) Alexander Zverev	7	6

Semifinals
1	(Serbia) Novak Djokovic	6	6
5	(Norway) Casper Ruud	4	3
4	(Greece) Stefanos Tsitsipas	4	6	6
2	(Germany) Alexander Zverev	6	3	3

Final
1	(Serbia) Novak Djokovic	6	7^{7}
4	(Greece) Stefanos Tsitsipas	0	6^{5}

=== Top half ===
==== Section 1 ====
First round
(South Africa) L Harris	6	3	6^{7}
A Karatsev	3	6	7^{9}
Q	(Serbia) L Đere	6	6^{3}	6
PR	(Croatia) B Ćorić	2	7^{7}	2
PR	(Switzerland) S Wawrinka	3	7	6
14	(United States) R Opelka	6	5	2
12	(Argentina) D Schwartzman	6	3	7^{7}
(Serbia) M Kecmanović	2	6	6^{3}
(Kazakhstan) A Bublik	6	4	3
LL	(United States) M Giron	3	6	6
(Spain) A Davidovich Fokina	6	4	6
I Ivashka	2	6	4

Second round
1	(Serbia) N Djokovic	6	6
A Karatsev	3	2
Q	(Serbia) L Đere	6^{8}	6	4
PR	(Switzerland) S Wawrinka	7^{10}	3	6
12	(Argentina) D Schwartzman	1	6^{4}
LL	(United States) M Giron	6	7^{7}
(Spain) A Davidovich Fokina	6	6^{2}	2
8	(Canada) F Auger-Aliassime	4	7^{7}	6

Third round
1	(Serbia) N Djokovic	6	6
PR	(Switzerland) S Wawrinka	2	2
LL	(United States) M Giron	3	2
8	(Canada) F Auger-Aliassime	6	6

Quarterfinals
1	(Serbia) N Djokovic	7	7^{7}
8	(Canada) F Auger-Aliassime	5	6^{1}

==== Section 2 ====
First round
Q	(Argentina) F Cerúndolo	4	3
(United States) J Isner	6	6
(Georgia (country)) N Basilashvili	7^{7}	6
(United Kingdom) D Evans	6^{2}	2
(Italy) L Sonego	6^{5}	6	3
13	(Canada) D Shapovalov	7^{7}	3	6
11	(Poland) H Hurkacz	6^{8}	6^{2}
(Belgium) D Goffin	7^{10}	7^{7}
(United States) J Brooksby	6	6
WC	(Italy) F Cobolli	3	4
(United States) S Korda	4	1
(Netherlands) B van de Zandschulp	6	6

Second round
3	(Spain) R Nadal	6	6
(United States) J Isner	3	1
(Georgia (country)) N Basilashvili	4	6^{5}
13	(Canada) D Shapovalov	6	7^{7}
(Belgium) D Goffin	0	6^{1}
(United States) J Brooksby	6	7^{7}
(Netherlands) B van de Zandschulp	7^{7}	2	4
5	(Norway) C Ruud	6^{4}	6	6

Third round
3	(Spain) R Nadal	6	5	2
13	(Canada) D Shapovalov	1	7	6
(United States) J Brooksby	3	4
5	(Norway) C Ruud	6	6

Quarterfinals
13	(Canada) D Shapovalov	6^{7}	5
5	(Norway) C Ruud	7^{9}	7

=== Bottom half ===
==== Section 3 ====
First round
(Serbia) F Krajinović	7^{9}	7^{7}
(United States) F Tiafoe	6^{7}	6^{4}
(Italy) F Fognini	6	7^{7}
PR	(Austria) D Thiem	4	6^{5}
(Spain) P Martínez	4	3
10	(Italy) J Sinner	6	6
15	(Spain) P Carreño Busta	6	6
(Argentina) F Delbonis	3	2
K Khachanov	6	6
Q	(Italy) G Zeppieri	3	4
(Bulgaria) G Dimitrov	6	6
Q	(United States) B Nakashima	3	4

Second round
6	A Rublev	2	4
(Serbia) F Krajinović	6	6
(Italy) F Fognini	2	6	3
10	(Italy) J Sinner	6	3	6
15	(Spain) P Carreño Busta	4	6	1
K Khachanov	6	2	6
(Bulgaria) G Dimitrov	3	7	6^{4}
4	(Greece) S Tsitsipas	6	5	7^{7}

Third round
(Serbia) F Krajinović	2	6^{6}
10	(Italy) J Sinner	6	7^{8}
K Khachanov	6	0	3
4	(Greece) S Tsitsipas	4	6	6

Quarterfinals
10	(Italy) J Sinner	6^{5}	2
4	(Greece) S Tsitsipas	7^{7}	6

==== Section 4 ====
First round
WC	(Italy) F Passaro	3	2
(Chile) C Garín	6	6
(Croatia) M Čilić	6	6
WC	(Italy) M Arnaldi	1	4
WC	(Italy) L Nardi	4	4
9	(United Kingdom) C Norrie	6	6
Q	(Serbia) D Lajović	4	1
(Australia) A de Minaur	6	6
(Spain) A Ramos Viñolas	4	4
(United States) T Paul	6	6
Q	(Netherlands) T Griekspoor	3	7^{9}	2
Q	(Argentina) S Báez	6	6^{7}	6

Second round
LL	(Finland) E Ruusuvuori	4	4
(Chile) C Garín	6	6
(Croatia) M Čilić	5	6	6
9	(United Kingdom) C Norrie	7	2	1
(Australia) A de Minaur	7	6
(United States) T Paul	5	4
Q	(Argentina) S Báez	6^{6}	3
2	(Germany) A Zverev	7^{8}	6

Third round
(Chile) C Garín	6	4	6
(Croatia) M Čilić	3	6	4
(Australia) A de Minaur	3	6^{5}
2	(Germany) A Zverev	6	7^{7}

Quarterfinals
(Chile) C Garín	5	2
2	(Germany) A Zverev	7	6

== Seeded players ==
The following are the seeded players. Seedings are based on ATP rankings as of 2 May 2022. Rankings and points before are as of 9 May 2022.

As a result of special ranking adjustment rules due to the COVID-19 pandemic, players are defending the higher of (i) their points from the 2021 tournament or (ii) the remaining 50% of their points from the 2020 tournament. Those points were not mandatory and are included in the table below only if they counted towards the player's ranking as of May 9, 2022. Players who are not defending points from the 2021 or 2020 tournaments will instead have their 19th best result replaced by their points from the 2022 tournament.

Seed	Rank	Player	Points before	Points defending (or 19th best result)^{†}	Points won	Points after	Status
1	1	(Serbia) Novak Djokovic	8,260	600	1,000	8,660	Champion, defeated (Greece) Stefanos Tsitsipas [4]
2	3	(Germany) Alexander Zverev	7,020	180	360	7,200	Semifinals lost to (Greece) Stefanos Tsitsipas [4]
3	4	(Spain) Rafael Nadal	6,435	1,000	90	5,525	Third round lost to (Canada) Denis Shapovalov [13]
4	5	(Greece) Stefanos Tsitsipas	5,750	180	600	6,170	Runner-up, lost to (Serbia) Novak Djokovic [1]
5	10	(Norway) Casper Ruud	3,760	180	360	3,940	Semifinals lost to (Serbia) Novak Djokovic [1]
6	7	Andrey Rublev	4,115	180	10	3,945	Second round lost to (Serbia) Filip Krajinović
~~7~~	~~6~~	~~(Spain) Carlos Alcaraz~~	4,773	(3)	0	4,770	Withdrew due to ankle injury
8	9	(Canada) Félix Auger-Aliassime	3,760	90	180	3,850	Quarterfinals lost to (Serbia) Novak Djokovic [1]
9	11	(United Kingdom) Cameron Norrie	3,380	70	45	3,355	Second round lost to (Croatia) Marin Čilić
10	13	(Italy) Jannik Sinner	3,060	45	180	3,195	Quarterfinals lost to (Greece) Stefanos Tsitsipas [4]
11	12	(Poland) Hubert Hurkacz	3,130	45	10	3,095	First round lost to (Belgium) David Goffin
12	15	(Argentina) Diego Schwartzman	2,760	300	45	2,505	Second round lost to (United States) Marcos Giron [LL]
13	16	(Canada) Denis Shapovalov	2,671	180	180	2,671	Quarterfinals lost to (Norway) Casper Ruud [5]
14	17	(United States) Reilly Opelka	2,440	360	10	2,090	First round lost to (Switzerland) Stan Wawrinka [PR]
15	18	(Spain) Pablo Carreño Busta	2,135	45	45	2,135	Second round lost to Karen Khachanov
~~16~~	~~19~~	~~(Spain) Roberto Bautista Agut~~	1,993	90	0	1,903	Withdrew due to right wrist injury

† This column shows either (a) the higher of the player's points from the 2021 tournament or 50% of his points from the 2020 tournament, or (b) his 19th best result (shown in brackets). Only ranking points counting towards the player's ranking as of May 9, 2022, are reflected in the column.

=== Withdrawn players ===
The following players would have been seeded, but withdrew before the tournament began.

Rank	Player	Points before	Points defending	Points after	Withdrawal reason
2	Daniil Medvedev	7,990	10	7,980	Hernia surgery
8	(Italy) Matteo Berrettini	3,895	90	3,805	Right hand injury
14	(United States) Taylor Fritz	2,965	45	2,920	Left foot injury

== Other entry information ==
=== Wildcards ===
- (Italy) Matteo Arnaldi
- (Italy) Flavio Cobolli
- (Italy) Luca Nardi
- (Italy) Francesco Passaro

=== Protected ranking ===
- (Croatia) Borna Ćorić
- (Austria) Dominic Thiem
- (Switzerland) Stan Wawrinka

=== Withdrawals ===
- (Spain) Carlos Alcaraz → replaced by (Finland) Emil Ruusuvuori
- (Spain) Roberto Bautista Agut → replaced by (United States) Marcos Giron
- (Italy) Matteo Berrettini → replaced by (United States) Sebastian Korda
- (United States) Taylor Fritz → replaced by (Spain) Pedro Martínez
- Daniil Medvedev → replaced by Ilya Ivashka
- (France) Gaël Monfils → replaced by (Spain) Alejandro Davidovich Fokina

== Qualifying ==
=== Seeds ===
1. (Argentina) Sebastián Báez (qualified)
2. (Denmark) Holger Rune (first round)
3. (France) Ugo Humbert (first round)
4. (Slovakia) Alex Molčan (first round)
5. (Argentina) Francisco Cerúndolo (qualified)
6. (Hungary) Márton Fucsovics (qualifying competition, retired)
7. (United States) Marcos Giron (qualifying competition, lucky loser)
8. (Serbia) Laslo Đere (qualified)
9. (United States) Mackenzie McDonald (first round)
10. (Netherlands) Tallon Griekspoor (qualified)
11. (Argentina) Federico Coria (first round)
12. (Finland) Emil Ruusuvuori (qualifying competition, lucky loser)
13. (France) Benoît Paire (first round)
14. (United States) Maxime Cressy (qualifying competition)

=== Qualifiers ===
1. (Argentina) Sebastián Báez
2. (Serbia) Laslo Đere
3. (United States) Brandon Nakashima
4. (Italy) Giulio Zeppieri
5. (Argentina) Francisco Cerúndolo
6. (Serbia) Dušan Lajović
7. (Netherlands) Tallon Griekspoor

=== Lucky losers ===
1. (United States) Marcos Giron
2. (Finland) Emil Ruusuvuori

=== Draw ===
==== First qualifier ====
First round
1	(Argentina) Sebastián Báez	6	6
(South Korea) Kwon Soon-woo	4	4
WC	(Italy) Giovanni Fonio	4	7^{9}	3
12	(Finland) Emil Ruusuvuori	6	6^{7}	6

Qualifying competition
1	(Argentina) Sebastián Báez	6^{3}	6	7
12	(Finland) Emil Ruusuvuori	7^{7}	4	5

==== Second qualifier ====
First round
2	(Denmark) Holger Rune	1	6	3
(Bolivia) Hugo Dellien	6	1	6
(Australia) Thanasi Kokkinakis	4	4
8	(Serbia) Laslo Đere	6	6

Qualifying competition
(Bolivia) Hugo Dellien	4	2
8	(Serbia) Laslo Đere	6	6

==== Third qualifier ====
First round
3	(France) Ugo Humbert	3	3
(United States) Brandon Nakashima	6	6
(Poland) Kamil Majchrzak	6	6
11	(Argentina) Federico Coria	4	2

Qualifying competition
(United States) Brandon Nakashima	6	7^{7}
(Poland) Kamil Majchrzak	4	6^{5}

==== Fourth qualifier ====
First round
4	(Slovakia) Alex Molčan	7^{7}	3	2
WC	(Italy) Giulio Zeppieri	6^{3}	6	6
WC	(Italy) Francesco Forti	1	3
14	(United States) Maxime Cressy	6	6

Qualifying competition
WC	(Italy) Giulio Zeppieri	4	6	7^{7}
14	(United States) Maxime Cressy	6	4	6^{5}

==== Fifth qualifier ====
First round
5	(Argentina) Francisco Cerúndolo	7^{7}	6
(Japan) Yoshihito Nishioka	6^{5}	3
(Portugal) João Sousa	6	6
9	(United States) Mackenzie McDonald	2	4

Qualifying competition
5	(Argentina) Francisco Cerúndolo	6	7^{7}
(Portugal) João Sousa	2	6^{4}

==== Sixth qualifier ====
First round
6	(Hungary) Márton Fucsovics	4	6	6
(United States) Denis Kudla	6	1	4
(Serbia) Dušan Lajović	6	7
13	(France) Benoît Paire	2	5

Qualifying competition
6	(Hungary) Márton Fucsovics	0^{r}
(Serbia) Dušan Lajović	4

==== Seventh qualifier ====
First round
7	(United States) Marcos Giron	6^{7}	6	6
WC	(Italy) Gianmarco Ferrari	7^{9}	3	2
(France) Adrian Mannarino	4	4
10	(Netherlands) Tallon Griekspoor	6	6

Qualifying competition
7	(United States) Marcos Giron	6^{7}	2
10	(Netherlands) Tallon Griekspoor	7^{9}	6
