= 2022 Italian Open (tennis) =

- Date: 8–15 May
- Edition: 79th
- Draw: 56S / 32D (men); 56S / 28D (women)
- Prize money: €6,008,725 (men) $2,527,250 (women)
- Surface: Clay / outdoor
- Location: Rome, Italy
- Venue: Foro Italico

Champions

Men's singles
- (Serbia) Novak Djokovic

Women's singles
- (Poland) Iga Świątek

Men's doubles
- (Croatia) Nikola Mektić / (Croatia) Mate Pavić

Women's doubles
- Veronika Kudermetova / Anastasia Pavlyuchenkova
← 2021 ·	Italian Open	· 2023 →

The 2022 Italian Open (also known as the Rome Masters or the Internazionali BNL d'Italia for sponsorship reasons) was a professional tennis tournament played on outdoor clay courts at the Foro Italico in Rome, Italy. It was the 79th edition of the Italian Open and was classified as an ATP Tour Masters 1000 event on the 2022 ATP Tour and a non-mandatory event on the 2022 WTA Tour. First-seeded Novak Djokovic and Iga Świątek won the singles title.

== Finals ==
=== Men's singles ===
- (Serbia) Novak Djokovic defeated (Greece) Stefanos Tsitsipas, 6–0, 7–6^{(7–5)}

This was Djokovic's 87th ATP singles title, and first of the year.

=== Women's singles ===
- (Poland) Iga Świątek defeated (Tunisia) Ons Jabeur, 6–2, 6–2

This was Świątek's 8th WTA singles title, and fifth of the year.

=== Men's doubles ===
- (Croatia) Nikola Mektić / (Croatia) Mate Pavić defeated (United States) John Isner / (Argentina) Diego Schwartzman, 6–3, 6–7^{(6–8)}, [12–10]

=== Women's doubles ===
- Veronika Kudermetova / Anastasia Pavlyuchenkova defeated (Canada) Gabriela Dabrowski / (Mexico) Giuliana Olmos 1–6, 6–4, [10–7]

== Points and prize money ==
=== Point distribution ===
Event	W	F	SF	QF	Round of 16	Round of 32	Round of 64	Q	Q2	Q1
Men's singles	1000	600	360	180	90	45	10	25	16	0
Men's doubles	1000	600	360	180	90	0	—	—	—	—
Women's singles	900	585	350	190	105	60	1	30	20	1
Women's doubles	900	585	350	190	105	1	—	—	—	—

=== Prize money ===
Event	W	F	SF	QF	Round of 16	Round of 32	Round of 64	Q2	Q1
Men's singles	€836,355	€456,720	€249,740	€136,225	€72,865	€39,070	€21,650	€11,090	€5,810
Women's singles	€332,260	€195,813	€100,806	€46,322	€23,170	€13,176	€9,456	€5,548	€2,888
Men's doubles*	€252,980	€135,180	€72,800	€40,570	€21,830	€11,580	—	—	—
Women's doubles*	€97,016	€54,540	€29,984	€15,120	€8,564	€5,742	—	—	—

_{*per team}
