= 2022 Qatar ExxonMobil Open – Doubles =

Doubles
- 2022 Qatar ExxonMobil Open

Final
- Champions: (Netherlands) Wesley Koolhof (United Kingdom) Neal Skupski
- Runners-up: (India) Rohan Bopanna (Canada) Denis Shapovalov
- Score: 7–6^{(7–4)}, 6–1

Details
- Draw: 16
- Seeds: 4

Events
Singles	Doubles
← 2021 ·	ATP Qatar Open	· 2023 →

Aslan Karatsev and Andrey Rublev were the defending champions but chose not to participate.

Wesley Koolhof and Neal Skupski won the title, defeating Rohan Bopanna and Denis Shapovalov in the final, 7–6^{(7–4)}, 6–1.

== Seeds ==
1. (Croatia) Nikola Mektić / (Croatia) Mate Pavić (quarterfinals)
2. (Croatia) Ivan Dodig / (New Zealand) Michael Venus (first round)
3. (Netherlands) Wesley Koolhof / (United Kingdom) Neal Skupski (champions)
4. (Belgium) Sander Gillé / (Belgium) Joran Vliegen (quarterfinals)

== Draw ==
=== Key ===
- Q = Qualifier
- WC = Wild card
- LL = Lucky loser
- Alt = Alternate
- SE = Special exempt
- PR = Protected ranking
- ITF = ITF entry
- JE = Junior exempt
- w/o = Walkover
- r = Retired
- d = Defaulted
- SR = Special ranking

=== Draw ===
First round
1	(Croatia) N Mektić (Croatia) M Pavić	6	7
(Israel) J Erlich (South Africa) L Harris	3	5
WC	(Qatar) I Alharrasi (Ukraine) I Marchenko	3	2
(United States) M McDonald (Netherlands) B van de Zandschulp	6	6
4	(Belgium) S Gillé (Belgium) J Vliegen	6	6^{2}	[10]
WC	(Tunisia) M Jaziri (Qatar) MS Zayid	1	7^{7}	[6]
(Slovakia) A Molčan (Czech Republic) J Veselý	5	6	[6]
(India) R Bopanna (Canada) D Shapovalov	7	4	[10]
(Georgia (country)) N Basilashvili (Spain) A Davidovich Fokina	6	7
Alt	(Finland) E Ruusuvuori (Sweden) E Ymer	1	5
(France) M Guinard (France) A Rinderknech	6	3	[6]
3	(Netherlands) W Koolhof (United Kingdom) N Skupski	2	6	[10]
(United Kingdom) D Evans (United Kingdom) K Skupski	4	4
(Kazakhstan) A Golubev (France) F Martin	6	6
(Kazakhstan) A Bublik (Hungary) M Fucsovics	7^{7}	6
2	(Croatia) I Dodig (New Zealand) M Venus	6^{4}	3

Quarterfinals
1	(Croatia) N Mektić (Croatia) M Pavić	2	6	[7]
(United States) M McDonald (Netherlands) B van de Zandschulp	6	3	[10]
4	(Belgium) S Gillé (Belgium) J Vliegen	6^{7}	4
(India) R Bopanna (Canada) D Shapovalov	7^{9}	6
(Georgia (country)) N Basilashvili (Spain) A Davidovich Fokina	3	2
3	(Netherlands) W Koolhof (United Kingdom) N Skupski	6	6
(Kazakhstan) A Golubev (France) F Martin	3	6	[10]
(Kazakhstan) A Bublik (Hungary) M Fucsovics	6	4	[7]

Semifinals
(United States) M McDonald (Netherlands) B van de Zandschulp	4	6^{2}
(India) R Bopanna (Canada) D Shapovalov	6	7^{7}
3	(Netherlands) W Koolhof (United Kingdom) N Skupski	6	7^{7}
(Kazakhstan) A Golubev (France) F Martin	4	6^{3}

Final
(India) R Bopanna (Canada) D Shapovalov	6^{4}	1
3	(Netherlands) W Koolhof (United Kingdom) N Skupski	7^{7}	6
