= 2021 Qatar ExxonMobil Open =

- Date: 8–14 March
- Edition: 29th
- Category: ATP Tour 250 series
- Draw: 32S / 16D
- Prize money: $1,153,560
- Surface: Hard / outdoor
- Location: Doha, Qatar
- Venue: Khalifa International Tennis and Squash Complex

Champions

Singles
- (Georgia (country)) Nikoloz Basilashvili

Doubles
- (Russia) Aslan Karatsev / (Russia) Andrey Rublev
← 2020 ·	ATP Qatar Open	· 2022 →

The 2021 Qatar Open (also known as 2021 Qatar ExxonMobil Open for sponsorship reasons) was the 29th edition of the Qatar Open, a men's tennis tournament which is played on outdoor hard courts. It was part of the ATP Tour 250 of the 2021 ATP Tour. It took place at the Khalifa International Tennis and Squash Complex in Doha, Qatar from 8 to 14 March 2021. The tournament was awarded the Tournament of the Year award in the 250 category from the 2019 ATP Awards for the third time in five years.

== Finals ==
=== Singles ===
- (Georgia (country)) Nikoloz Basilashvili defeated (Spain) Roberto Bautista Agut, 7–6^{(7–5)}, 6–2

=== Doubles ===
- (Russia) Aslan Karatsev / (Russia) Andrey Rublev defeated (New Zealand) Marcus Daniell / (Austria) Philipp Oswald, 7–5, 6–4.

== Points and prize money ==
=== Point distribution ===
Event	W	F	SF	QF	Round of 16	Round of 32	Q	Q2	Q1
Singles	250	150	90	45	20	0	12	6	0
Doubles	250	150	90	45	0	—	—	—	—

=== Prize money ===
Event	W	F	SF	QF	Round of 16	Round of 32	Q2	Q1
Singles	$103,070	$73,885	$52,595	$35,060	$22,540	$13,560	$5,760	$3,395
Doubles	$38,470	$27,550	$18,160	$11,800	$6,910	—	—	—
Doubles prize money per team

== Singles main-draw entrants ==
=== Seeds ===
Country	Player	Rank^{1}	Seed
AUT	Dominic Thiem	4	1
SUI	Roger Federer	5	2
RUS	Andrey Rublev	8	3
CAN	Denis Shapovalov	11	4
ESP	Roberto Bautista Agut	13	5
BEL	David Goffin	14	6
SUI	Stan Wawrinka	20	7
~~CRO~~	~~Borna Ćorić~~	~~26~~	~~8~~

- ^{1} Rankings are as of 1 March 2021.

=== Other entrants ===
The following players received wildcards into the singles main draw:

- (Tunisia) Malek Jaziri
- (Russia) Aslan Karatsev
- (Qatar) Mubarak Shannan Zayid

The following players received entry from the qualifying draw:

- (South Africa) Lloyd Harris
- (Australia) Christopher O'Connell
- (India) Ramkumar Ramanathan
- (Slovenia) Blaz Rola

The following player received entry as a lucky loser:

- (Slovakia) Norbert Gombos

=== Withdrawals ===
Before the tournament

- (South Africa) Kevin Anderson → replaced by (Georgia (country)) Nikoloz Basilashvili
- (Spain) Pablo Carreño Busta → replaced by (France) Richard Gasquet
- (Croatia) Borna Ćorić → replaced by (Slovakia) Norbert Gombos
- (Poland) Hubert Hurkacz → replaced by (Kazakhstan) Alexander Bublik
- (France) Gaël Monfils → replaced by (Canada) Vasek Pospisil

During the tournament

- (Hungary) Márton Fucsovics
- (France) Richard Gasquet

== Doubles main-draw entrants ==
=== Seeds ===
Country	Player	Country	Player	Rank^{1}	Seed
COL	Juan Sebastián Cabal	COL	Robert Farah	3	1
CRO	Nikola Mektić	CRO	Mate Pavić	8	2
CRO	Ivan Dodig	SVK	Filip Polášek	19	3
BRA	Marcelo Melo	NED	Jean-Julien Rojer	36	4

- ^{1} Rankings are as of 1 March 2021.

=== Other entrants ===
The following pairs received wildcards into the doubles main draw:

- (Tunisia) Malek Jaziri / (Qatar) Mubarak Shannan Zayid
- (Slovenia) Blaž Rola / (Qatar) Mousa Shanan Zayed

=== Retirements ===
- (Denmark) Frederik Nielsen / (Germany) Tim Pütz
