= 2023 Qatar ExxonMobil Open =

- Date: 20–25 February 2023
- Edition: 31st
- Category: ATP Tour 250 series
- Draw: 28S/16D
- Prize money: $1,377,025
- Surface: Hard / outdoor
- Location: Doha, Qatar
- Venue: Khalifa International Tennis and Squash Complex

Champions

Singles
- Daniil Medvedev

Doubles
- (India) Rohan Bopanna / (Australia) Matthew Ebden
- Qatar ExxonMobil Open

The 2023 Qatar Open (also known as 2023 Qatar ExxonMobil Open for sponsorship reasons) was the 31st edition of the Qatar Open, a men's tennis tournament played on outdoor hard courts. It was part of the ATP Tour 250 of the 2023 ATP Tour, and took place at the Khalifa International Tennis and Squash Complex in Doha, Qatar from 20 to 25 February 2023.

== Finals ==
=== Singles ===
- Daniil Medvedev defeated (United Kingdom) Andy Murray, 6–4, 6–4.

=== Doubles ===
- (India) Rohan Bopanna / (Australia) Matthew Ebden defeated (France) Constant Lestienne / (Netherlands) Botic van de Zandschulp 6–7^{(5–7)}, 6–4, [10–6].

== Points and prize money ==
=== Point distribution ===
Event	W	F	SF	QF	Round of 16	Round of 32	Q	Q2	Q1
Singles	250	150	90	45	20	0	12	6	0
Doubles	250	150	90	45	0	—N/a	—N/a	—N/a	—N/a

=== Prize money ===
Event	W	F	SF	QF	Round of 16	Round of 32	Q2	Q1
Singles	$209,445	$122,175	$71,830	$41,615	$24,165	$14,770	$7,385	$4,030
Doubles*	$72,780	$38,940	$22,820	$12,750	$7,520	—N/a	—N/a	—N/a
Doubles prize money per team

== Singles main-draw entrants ==
=== Seeds ===
Country	Player	Rank^{1}	Seed
	Andrey Rublev	5	1
CAN	Félix Auger-Aliassime	8	2
	Daniil Medvedev	11	3
GER	Alexander Zverev	17	4
ESP	Roberto Bautista Agut	24	5
GBR	Dan Evans	29	6
ESP	Alejandro Davidovich Fokina	31	7
NED	Botic van de Zandschulp	35	8

- ^{1} Rankings are as of 13 February 2023.

=== Other entrants ===
The following players received wildcards into the singles main draw:

- (United Kingdom) Andy Murray
- (Jordan) Abedallah Shelbayh
- (Spain) Fernando Verdasco

The following players received entry from the qualifying draw:

- (United Kingdom) Liam Broady
- (Bosnia and Herzegovina) Damir Džumhur
- (Ukraine) Oleksii Krutykh
- (France) Alexandre Müller

The following player received entry as a lucky loser:

- (Georgia (country)) Nikoloz Basilashvili

=== Withdrawals ===
Before the tournament

- (Croatia) Marin Čilić → replaced by (Hungary) Márton Fucsovics
- (Croatia) Borna Ćorić → replaced by (Australia) Christopher O'Connell
- (United Kingdom) Jack Draper → replaced by (Georgia (country)) Nikoloz Basilashvili
- (Spain) Rafael Nadal → replaced by Ilya Ivashka

== Doubles main-draw entrants ==
=== Seeds ===
Country	Player	Country	Player	Rank^{1}	Seed
CRO	Nikola Mektić	CRO	Mate Pavić	15	1
MON	Hugo Nys	POL	Jan Zieliński	36	2
IND	Rohan Bopanna	AUS	Matthew Ebden	62	3
NED	Robin Haase	NED	Matwé Middelkoop	66	4

- ^{1} Rankings are as of 13 February 2023.

=== Other entrants ===
The following pairs received wildcards into the doubles main draw:

- (United Kingdom) Liam Broady / (Germany) Alexander Zverev
- (Tunisia) Malek Jaziri / (Qatar) Mubarak Shannan Zayid

The following pair received entry as alternates:

- (Finland) Patrik Niklas-Salminen / (Finland) Emil Ruusuvuori

=== Withdrawals ===
- (United Kingdom) Jack Draper / (Czech Republic) Jiří Lehečka → replaced by (Finland) Patrik Niklas-Salminen / (Finland) Emil Ruusuvuori
- (South Africa) Lloyd Harris / (South Africa) Raven Klaasen → replaced by (South Africa) Raven Klaasen / (United States) Hunter Reese
- (Germany) Kevin Krawietz / (Germany) Tim Pütz → replaced by (Germany) Tim Pütz / (Germany) Jan-Lennard Struff
