= 2021 Qatar ExxonMobil Open – Doubles =

Doubles
- 2021 Qatar ExxonMobil Open

Final
- Champions: (Russia) Aslan Karatsev (Russia) Andrey Rublev
- Runners-up: (New Zealand) Marcus Daniell (Austria) Philipp Oswald
- Score: 7–5, 6–4

Details
- Draw: 16
- Seeds: 4

Events
Singles	Doubles
← 2020 ·	ATP Qatar Open	· 2022 →

Rohan Bopanna and Wesley Koolhof were the defending champions, but they decided not to participate this year.

Aslan Karatsev and Andrey Rublev won the title, defeating Marcus Daniell and Philipp Oswald in the final, 7–5, 6–4.

== Seeds ==
1. (Colombia) Juan Sebastián Cabal / (Colombia) Robert Farah (semifinals)
2. (Croatia) Nikola Mektić / (Croatia) Mate Pavić (quarterfinals)
3. (Croatia) Ivan Dodig / (Slovakia) Filip Polášek (first round)
4. (Brazil) Marcelo Melo / (Netherlands) Jean-Julien Rojer (quarterfinals)

== Draw ==
=== Key ===
- Q = Qualifier
- WC = Wild card
- LL = Lucky loser
- Alt = Alternate
- SE = Special exempt
- PR = Protected ranking
- ITF = ITF entry
- JE = Junior exempt
- w/o = Walkover
- r = Retired
- d = Defaulted
- SR = Special ranking

=== Draw ===
First round
1	(Colombia) JS Cabal (Colombia) R Farah	6	6
WC	(Tunisia) M Jaziri (Qatar) MS Zayid	3	2
(Georgia (country)) N Basilashvili (Kazakhstan) A Bublik	1	2
(Denmark) F Nielsen (Germany) T Pütz	6	6
3	(Croatia) I Dodig (Slovakia) F Polášek	3	7^{7}	[9]
(New Zealand) M Daniell (Austria) P Oswald	6	6^{2}	[11]
(Australia) J Millman (Spain) D Vega Hernández	6	6
WC	(Slovenia) B Rola (Qatar) MS Zayed	1	3
(Russia) A Karatsev (Russia) A Rublev	7^{7}	6
(Italy) L Sonego (Italy) A Vavassori	6^{2}	2
(Germany) K Krawietz (United States) R Opelka	1	6^{9}
4	(Brazil) M Melo (Netherlands) J-J Rojer	6	7^{11}
(France) J Chardy (France) F Martin	6	6
(Israel) J Erlich (Belarus) A Vasilevski	2	2
(El Salvador) M Arévalo (Netherlands) M Middelkoop	1	3
2	(Croatia) N Mektić (Croatia) M Pavić	6	6

Quarterfinals
1	(Colombia) JS Cabal (Colombia) R Farah	6	0
(Denmark) F Nielsen (Germany) T Pütz	3	0^{r}
(New Zealand) M Daniell (Austria) P Oswald	6	6
(Australia) J Millman (Spain) D Vega Hernández	4	1
(Russia) A Karatsev (Russia) A Rublev	6	6
4	(Brazil) M Melo (Netherlands) J-J Rojer	2	3
(France) J Chardy (France) F Martin	6	6
2	(Croatia) N Mektić (Croatia) M Pavić	4	4

Semifinals
1	(Colombia) JS Cabal (Colombia) R Farah	3	4
(New Zealand) M Daniell (Austria) P Oswald	6	6
(Russia) A Karatsev (Russia) A Rublev	7^{7}	7^{7}
(France) J Chardy (France) F Martin	6^{5}	6^{2}

Final
(New Zealand) M Daniell (Austria) P Oswald	5	4
(Russia) A Karatsev (Russia) A Rublev	7	6
