= 2022 Qatar ExxonMobil Open – Singles =

Singles
- 2022 Qatar ExxonMobil Open

Final
- Champion: (Spain) Roberto Bautista Agut
- Runner-up: (Georgia (country)) Nikoloz Basilashvili
- Score: 6–3, 6–4

Details
- Draw: 28 (4 Q / 3 WC )
- Seeds: 8

Events
Singles	Doubles
- ATP Qatar Open

Roberto Bautista Agut defeated defending champion Nikoloz Basilashvili in a rematch of the previous year's final, 6–3, 6–4 to win the singles tennis title at the 2022 Qatar Open.

== Seeds ==
The top four seeds received a bye into the second round.

1. (Canada) Denis Shapovalov (quarterfinals)
2. (Spain) Roberto Bautista Agut (champion)
3. (Georgia (country)) Nikoloz Basilashvili (final)
4. (Croatia) Marin Čilić (quarterfinals)
5. (United Kingdom) Dan Evans (second round)
6. (Russia) Karen Khachanov (semifinals)
7. (Kazakhstan) Alexander Bublik (second round)
8. (South Africa) Lloyd Harris (first round)

== Draw ==
Key

- Q = Qualifier
- WC = Wild card
- LL = Lucky loser
- Alt = Alternate
- ITF = ITF entry
- PR = Protected ranking
- SR = Special ranking
- SE = Special exempt
- JE = Junior exempt
- JR = Junior Accelerator Programme entrant
- CO = College Accelerator Programme entrant
- NG = Next Gen Accelerator Program entrant
- w/o = Walkover
- r = Retired
- d = Defaulted

=== Finals ===
Semifinals
(France) Arthur Rinderknech	4	2
3	(Georgia (country)) Nikoloz Basilashvili	6	6
6	(Russia) Karen Khachanov	6	3	5
2	(Spain) Roberto Bautista Agut	2	6	7

Final
3	(Georgia (country)) Nikoloz Basilashvili	3	4
2	(Spain) Roberto Bautista Agut	6	6

=== Top half ===
First round
(Slovakia) A Molčan	6^{4}	7^{8}	6
Q	(Australia) C O'Connell	7^{7}	6^{6}	4
(Czech Republic) J Veselý	6	6^{4}	4
(France) A Rinderknech	3	7^{7}	6
Q	(Slovakia) J Kovalík	2	4
7	(Kazakhstan) A Bublik	6	6
LL	(Portugal) J Sousa	6	3	5
LL	(Sweden) E Ymer	2	6	7
Q	(United States) C Eubanks	6^{6}	6	4
(South Korea) S-w Kwon	7^{8}	1	6
(Hungary) M Fucsovics	6	7^{7}
8	(South Africa) L Harris	4	6^{4}

Second round
1	(Canada) D Shapovalov	6	6
(Slovakia) A Molčan	4	0
(France) A Rinderknech	6^{5}	6	6
7	(Kazakhstan) A Bublik	7^{7}	1	4
3	(Georgia (country)) N Basilashvili	6	7
LL	(Sweden) E Ymer	4	5
(South Korea) S-w Kwon	3	7^{7}	3
(Hungary) M Fucsovics	6	6^{5}	6

Quarterfinals
1	(Canada) D Shapovalov	4	4
(France) A Rinderknech	6	6
3	(Georgia (country)) N Basilashvili	1	6	7
(Hungary) M Fucsovics	6	3	5

Semifinals
(France) A Rinderknech	4	2
3	(Georgia (country)) N Basilashvili	6	6

=== Bottom half ===
First round
6	(Russia) K Khachanov	7^{7}	6
(United States) M McDonald	6^{3}	3
(Belgium) D Goffin	6	4	1
(Finland) E Ruusuvuori	4	6	6
Q	(Italy) T Fabbiano	2	6^{5}
(Netherlands) B van de Zandschulp	6	7^{7}
5	(United Kingdom) D Evans	6	6
(Belarus) E Gerasimov	4	4
WC	(Tunisia) M Jaziri	1	3
(Spain) A Davidovich Fokina	6	6
(Japan) T Daniel	2	2
WC	(United Kingdom) A Murray	6	6

Second round
6	(Russia) K Khachanov	7^{7}	6
(Finland) E Ruusuvuori	6^{4}	3
(Netherlands) B van de Zandschulp	3	5
4/WC	(Croatia) M Čilić	6	7
5	(United Kingdom) D Evans	6	5	4
(Spain) A Davidovich Fokina	4	7	6
WC	(United Kingdom) A Murray	0	1
2	(Spain) R Bautista Agut	6	6

Quarterfinals
6	(Russia) K Khachanov	3	6	6
4/WC	(Croatia) M Čilić	6	3	4
(Spain) A Davidovich Fokina	1	1
2	(Spain) R Bautista Agut	6	6

Semifinals
6	(Russia) K Khachanov	6	3	5
2	(Spain) R Bautista Agut	2	6	7

== Qualifying ==
=== Seeds ===
1. (Portugal) João Sousa (qualifying competition, lucky loser)
2. (Sweden) Elias Ymer (qualifying competition, lucky loser)
3. (Australia) Christopher O'Connell (qualified)
4. (Ukraine) Illya Marchenko (qualifying competition)
5. (United States) Christopher Eubanks (qualified)
6. (Slovakia) Jozef Kovalík (qualified)
7. (Italy) Thomas Fabbiano (qualified)
8. (Russia) Pavel Kotov (qualifying competition)

=== Qualifiers ===
1. (Italy) Thomas Fabbiano
2. (United States) Christopher Eubanks
3. (Australia) Christopher O'Connell
4. (Slovakia) Jozef Kovalík

=== Lucky losers ===
1. (Sweden) Elias Ymer
2. (Portugal) João Sousa

=== Qualifying draw ===
==== First qualifier ====
First round
1	(Portugal) João Sousa	6	1	7^{7}
(Russia) Evgeny Karlovskiy	3	6	6^{5}
WC	(Qatar) Issa Alharrasi	0	2
7	(Italy) Thomas Fabbiano	6	6

Qualifying competition
1	(Portugal) João Sousa	6^{6}	4
7	(Italy) Thomas Fabbiano	7^{8}	6

==== Second qualifier ====
First round
2	(Sweden) Elias Ymer	6	6
Alt	(Austria) Kris Krawcewicz	1	2
(Tunisia) Aziz Dougaz	3	4
5	(United States) Christopher Eubanks	6	6

Qualifying competition
2	(Sweden) Elias Ymer	6^{6}	4
5	(United States) Christopher Eubanks	7^{8}	6

==== Third qualifier ====
First round
3	(Australia) Christopher O'Connell	6	6
WC	(Qatar) Mubarak Shannan Zayid	2	1
(Bosnia and Herzegovina) Nerman Fatić	2	5
8	(Russia) Pavel Kotov	6	7

Qualifying competition
3	(Australia) Christopher O'Connell	6	6
8	(Russia) Pavel Kotov	2	2

==== Fourth qualifier ====
First round
4	(Ukraine) Illya Marchenko	6	7^{7}
(France) Maxime Janvier	4	6^{3}
Alt	(Kazakhstan) Andrey Golubev	4	6^{2}
6	(Slovakia) Jozef Kovalík	6	7^{7}

Qualifying competition
4	(Ukraine) Illya Marchenko	1	6^{8}
6	(Slovakia) Jozef Kovalík	6	7^{10}
