= 2022 BNP Paribas Open – Men's singles =

Tennis tournament event

Men's singles
- 2022 BNP Paribas Open

Final
- Champion: (United States) Taylor Fritz
- Runner-up: (Spain) Rafael Nadal
- Score: 6–3, 7–6^{(7–5)}

Details
- Draw: 96 (12 Q / 5 WC)
- Seeds: 32

Events
Singles	men	women
Doubles	men	women
- Indian Wells Masters

Taylor Fritz defeated Rafael Nadal in the final, 6–3, 7–6^{(7–5)} to win the men's singles title at the 2022 Indian Wells Masters. It was his first Masters 1000 title and second career title overall. Fritz was the first American to win the title since Andre Agassi in 2001. The loss ended Nadal's 20-match winning streak, dating back to the 2022 Melbourne Open.

Cameron Norrie was the defending champion, but lost in the quarterfinals to Carlos Alcaraz, who became the youngest Indian Wells semifinalist since Agassi in 1988.

This was the first ATP Tour tournament since the international governing bodies of tennis (WTA, ATP, ITF, Australian Open, French Open, Wimbledon, US Open) allowed players from Russia and Belarus to continue to participate in tennis events on Tour and at the majors, but not under the name or flag of Russia or Belarus until further notice, due to the 2022 Russian invasion of Ukraine.

Daniil Medvedev and Novak Djokovic were in contention for the world No. 1 singles ranking. Despite his withdrawal from the tournament, Djokovic reclaimed the ranking after Medvedev lost to Gaël Monfils in the third round.

With his third-round win, Nadal became the first player to win 400 Masters matches.

== Seeds ==
All seeds received a bye into the second round.

1. Daniil Medvedev (third round)
2. (Serbia) Novak Djokovic (withdrew due to travel restrictions)
3. (Germany) Alexander Zverev (second round)
4. (Spain) Rafael Nadal (final)
5. (Greece) Stefanos Tsitsipas (third round)
6. (Italy) Matteo Berrettini (fourth round)
7. Andrey Rublev (semifinals)
8. (Norway) Casper Ruud (third round)
9. (Canada) Félix Auger-Aliassime (second round)
10. (Italy) Jannik Sinner (fourth round, withdrew due to illness)
11. (Poland) Hubert Hurkacz (fourth round)
12. (United Kingdom) Cameron Norrie (quarterfinals)
13. (Canada) Denis Shapovalov (third round)
14. (Argentina) Diego Schwartzman (third round)
15. (Spain) Roberto Bautista Agut (third round)
16. (Spain) Pablo Carreño Busta (second round)
17. (United States) Reilly Opelka (fourth round)

18. (Georgia (country)) Nikoloz Basilashvili (third round)
19. (Spain) Carlos Alcaraz (semifinals)
20. (United States) Taylor Fritz (champion)
21. (Italy) Lorenzo Sonego (second round)
22. Aslan Karatsev (second round)
23. (United States) John Isner (fourth round)
24. (Croatia) Marin Čilić (second round)
25. Karen Khachanov (second round)
26. (France) Gaël Monfils (fourth round)
27. (United Kingdom) Dan Evans (third round)
28. (United States) Frances Tiafoe (third round)
29. (Australia) Alex de Minaur (fourth round)
30. (South Africa) Lloyd Harris (third round)
31. (Kazakhstan) Alexander Bublik (third round)
32. (Argentina) Federico Delbonis (second round)
33. (Bulgaria) Grigor Dimitrov (quarterfinals)

Click on the seed number of a player to go to their draw section.

== Draw ==
Key

- Q = Qualifier
- WC = Wild card
- LL = Lucky loser
- Alt = Alternate
- ITF = ITF entry
- PR = Protected ranking
- SR = Special ranking
- SE = Special exempt
- JE = Junior exempt
- JR = Junior Accelerator Programme entrant
- CO = College Accelerator Programme entrant
- NG = Next Gen Accelerator Program entrant
- w/o = Walkover
- r = Retired
- d = Defaulted

=== Finals ===
Quarterfinals
19	(Spain) Carlos Alcaraz	6	6
12	(United Kingdom) Cameron Norrie	4	3
4	(Spain) Rafael Nadal	7^{7}	5	6
WC	(Australia) Nick Kyrgios	6^{0}	7	4
(Serbia) Miomir Kecmanović	6^{5}	6	1
20	(United States) Taylor Fritz	7^{7}	3	6
7	Andrey Rublev	7	6
33	(Bulgaria) Grigor Dimitrov	5	2

Semifinals
19	(Spain) Carlos Alcaraz	4	6	3
4	(Spain) Rafael Nadal	6	4	6
20	(United States) Taylor Fritz	7	6
7	Andrey Rublev	5	4

Final
4	(Spain) Rafael Nadal	3	6^{5}
20	(United States) Taylor Fritz	6	7^{7}

=== Top half ===
==== Section 1 ====
First round
Q	(Czech Republic) T Macháč	6	7
(Australia) A Popyrin	3	5
(Serbia) F Krajinović	7	4	6
(Serbia) D Lajović	5	6	1
(United States) M McDonald	7^{13}	7
(Hungary) M Fucsovics	6^{11}	5
Q	(United States) JJ Wolf	7	6
(France) H Gaston	5	4

Second round
1	D Medvedev	6	6
Q	(Czech Republic) T Macháč	3	2
(Serbia) F Krajinović	3	4
26	(France) G Monfils	6	6
19	(Spain) C Alcaraz	6	6
(United States) M McDonald	3	3
Q	(United States) JJ Wolf	3	7^{7}	6^{5}
15	(Spain) R Bautista Agut	6	6^{3}	7^{7}

Third round
1	D Medvedev	6	3	1
26	(France) G Monfils	4	6	6
19	(Spain) C Alcaraz	6	6
15	(Spain) R Bautista Agut	2	0

Fourth round
26	(France) G Monfils	5	1
19	(Spain) C Alcaraz	7	6

==== Section 2 ====
First round
(Spain) P Martínez	6	7
LL	(Portugal) J Sousa	4	5
(Italy) F Fognini	3	6	6
(Spain) P Andújar	6	3	3
(United States) J Brooksby	6	6
(Spain) R Carballés Baena	1	4
(Argentina) JM Cerúndolo	1	1
WC	(United States) J Sock	6	6

Second round
12	(United Kingdom) C Norrie	6	6
(Spain) P Martínez	3	3
(Italy) F Fognini
18	(Georgia (country)) N Basilashvili	w/o
25	K Khachanov	0	3
(United States) J Brooksby	6	6
WC	(United States) J Sock	6^{5}	6	6^{5}
5	(Greece) S Tsitsipas	7^{7}	3	7^{7}

Third round
12	(United Kingdom) C Norrie	3	6	6
18	(Georgia (country)) N Basilashvili	6	3	1
(United States) J Brooksby	1	6	6
5	(Greece) S Tsitsipas	6	3	2

Fourth round
12	(United Kingdom) C Norrie	6	6
(United States) J Brooksby	2	4

==== Section 3 ====
First round
(United States) S Korda	6	6
Q	(Australia) T Kokkinakis	3	4
(Argentina) F Coria	6	7^{7}
PR	(Uruguay) P Cuevas	4	6^{5}
(United States) M Giron	3	5
(Italy) L Musetti	6	7
PR	(Croatia) B Ćorić	7^{7}	0	5
(Spain) A Davidovich Fokina	6^{5}	6	7

Second round
4	(Spain) R Nadal	6	1	7^{7}
(United States) S Korda	2	6	6^{3}
(Argentina) F Coria	2	0
27	(United Kingdom) D Evans	6	6
17	(United States) R Opelka	6	6
(Italy) L Musetti	1	4
(Spain) A Davidovich Fokina	6	4	2
13	(Canada) D Shapovalov	4	6	6

Third round
4	(Spain) R Nadal	7	6
27	(United Kingdom) D Evans	5	3
17	(United States) R Opelka	6^{4}	6	6
13	(Canada) D Shapovalov	7^{7}	4	4

Fourth round
4	(Spain) R Nadal	7^{7}	7^{7}
17	(United States) R Opelka	6^{3}	6^{5}

==== Section 4 ====
First round
(South Korea) S-w Kwon	6	3	4
(Serbia) L Đere	2	6	6
(France) B Bonzi	6	7
(France) A Rinderknech	3	5
WC	(Australia) N Kyrgios	6	6
(Argentina) S Báez	4	0
Q	(United States) C Eubanks	5	7^{10}	6
(United States) M Cressy	7	6^{8}	4

Second round
10	(Italy) J Sinner	6	6
(Serbia) L Đere	3	3
(France) B Bonzi	6	6
21	(Italy) L Sonego	3	4
32	(Argentina) F Delbonis	2	2
WC	(Australia) N Kyrgios	6	6
Q	(United States) C Eubanks	6^{5}	2
8	(Norway) C Ruud	7^{7}	6

Third round
10	(Italy) J Sinner	7^{7}	3	6
(France) B Bonzi	6^{5}	6	4
WC	(Australia) N Kyrgios	6	6
8	(Norway) C Ruud	4	4

Fourth round
10	(Italy) J Sinner
WC	(Australia) N Kyrgios	w/o

=== Bottom half ===
==== Section 5 ====
First round
(France) U Humbert	3	2
Q	(Denmark) H Rune	6	6
(Argentina) F Bagnis	6	7^{7}
(Switzerland) H Laaksonen	3	6^{4}
Q	(United Kingdom) L Broady	4	6	4
(Serbia) M Kecmanović	6	4	6
Q	(United States) T Sandgren	4	2
(Netherlands) B van de Zandschulp	6	6

Second round
6	(Italy) M Berrettini	6	4	6
Q	(Denmark) H Rune	3	6	4
(Argentina) F Bagnis	3	6	3
30	(South Africa) L Harris	6	4	6
24	(Croatia) M Čilić	7^{9}	3	6^{6}
(Serbia) M Kecmanović	6^{7}	6	7^{8}
(Netherlands) B van de Zandschulp	7^{7}	6^{4}	6
9	(Canada) F Auger-Aliassime	6^{4}	7^{7}	3

Third round
6	(Italy) M Berrettini	6	7
30	(South Africa) L Harris	4	5
(Serbia) M Kecmanović	7^{7}	7
(Netherlands) B van de Zandschulp	6^{3}	5

Fourth round
6	(Italy) M Berrettini	3	7^{7}	4
(Serbia) M Kecmanović	6	6^{5}	6

==== Section 6 ====
First round
Q	(Spain) J Munar	6	6
Q	(China) J Shang	3	4
(Poland) K Majchrzak	6	7
PR	(Slovenia) A Bedene	1	5
LL	(Australia) J Millman	7^{8}	6
(Germany) J-L Struff	6^{6}	4
Q	(Kazakhstan) M Kukushkin	4	4
(United States) T Paul	6	6

Second round
16	(Spain) P Carreño Busta	6	4	6^{4}
Q	(Spain) J Munar	4	6	7^{7}
(Poland) K Majchrzak	1	1
20	(United States) T Fritz	6	6
29	(Australia) A de Minaur	7^{7}	6
LL	(Australia) J Millman	6^{4}	3
(United States) T Paul	6	4	7^{7}
3	(Germany) A Zverev	2	6	6^{2}

Third round
Q	(Spain) J Munar	4	6	6^{2}
20	(United States) T Fritz	6	2	7^{7}
29	(Australia) A de Minaur	7^{7}	6
(United States) T Paul	6^{2}	4

Fourth round
20	(United States) T Fritz	3	6	7^{7}
29	(Australia) A de Minaur	6	4	6^{5}

==== Section 7 ====
First round
(Germany) D Koepfer	2	7	6
(France) B Paire	6	5	4
(France) A Mannarino	2	6^{4}
(United States) B Nakashima	6	7^{7}
WC	(United States) S Johnson	6	7^{7}
(Germany) D Altmaier	3	6^{3}
(France) R Gasquet	2	6	3
(Germany) O Otte	6	1	6

Second round
7	A Rublev	7	6
(Germany) D Koepfer	5	4
(United States) B Nakashima	4	4
28	(United States) F Tiafoe	6	6
22	A Karatsev	6^{5}	4
WC	(United States) S Johnson	7^{7}	6
(Germany) O Otte	3	6	3
11	(Poland) H Hurkacz	6	3	6

Third round
7	A Rublev	6	6
28	(United States) F Tiafoe	3	4
WC	(United States) S Johnson	6^{7}	3
11	(Poland) H Hurkacz	7^{9}	6

Fourth round
7	A Rublev	7^{7}	6
11	(Poland) H Hurkacz	6^{5}	4

==== Section 8 ====
First round
Q	(Germany) P Kohlschreiber	3	3
(Finland) E Ruusuvuori	6	6
(Netherlands) T Griekspoor	7^{7}	2	4
WC	(United States) S Querrey	6^{3}	6	6
WC	(United Kingdom) A Murray	1	6	6
Q	(Japan) T Daniel	6	2	4
(Australia) J Thompson	4	7	7^{7}
(Belgium) D Goffin	6	5	6^{3}

Second round
14	(Argentina) D Schwartzman	5	6	6
(Finland) E Ruusuvuori	7	3	3
WC	(United States) S Querrey	6^{6}	6^{2}
23	(United States) J Isner	7^{8}	7^{7}
31	(Kazakhstan) A Bublik	7^{11}	6
WC	(United Kingdom) A Murray	6^{9}	3
(Australia) J Thompson	6^{3}	2
33	(Bulgaria) G Dimitrov	7^{7}	6

Third round
14	(Argentina) D Schwartzman	5	3
23	(United States) J Isner	7	6
31	(Kazakhstan) A Bublik	3	4
33	(Bulgaria) G Dimitrov	6	6

Fourth round
23	(United States) J Isner	3	6^{6}
33	(Bulgaria) G Dimitrov	6	7^{8}

== Seeded players ==
The following are the seeded players, based on ATP rankings as of March 7, 2022. Rank and points before are as of March 7, 2022.

As a result of pandemic-related adjustments to the ranking system and changes to the ATP Tour calendar in 2021, ranking points after the tournament (as of March 21, 2022) will be calculated as follows:

- Points from tournaments held during the weeks of March 8 and March 15, 2021 (Doha, Marseille, Santiago, Dubai and Acapulco) will be dropped at the end of the tournament and replaced by points from the 2022 Indian Wells tournament.
- Players who are not defending points from the tournaments listed above will have their 19th best result replaced by their points from the 2022 tournament.
- Points from the 2021 tournament will not drop until October 17, 2022 (52 weeks after the 2021 tournament) and are accordingly not reflected in this table.
- The other half of the remaining points from the 2019 tournament will be dropped on March 21, 2022, around three years after the end of the 2019 tournament.

Seed	Rank	Player	Points before	Points dropped (or 19th best result)^{†}	Points won	Points after	Status
1	1	Daniil Medvedev	8,615	250	45	8,410	Third round lost to (France) Gaël Monfils [26]
~~2~~	~~2~~	(Serbia) ~~Novak Djokovic~~	8,465	(0)	0	8,465	Withdrew due to not meeting vaccination requirements
3	3	(Germany) Alexander Zverev	7,515	500	10	7,025	Second round lost to (United States) Tommy Paul
4	4	(Spain) Rafael Nadal	6,515	(0)	600	7,115	Runner-up, lost to (United States) Taylor Fritz [20]
5	5	(Greece) Stefanos Tsitsipas	6,325	300	45	6,070	Third round lost to (United States) Jenson Brooksby
6	6	(Italy) Matteo Berrettini	4,928	63^{‡}	90	4,955	Fourth round lost to (Serbia) Miomir Kecmanović
7	7	Andrey Rublev	4,590	90+180	360+45	4,725	Semifinal lost to (United States) Taylor Fritz [20]
8	8	(Norway) Casper Ruud	3,915	90	45	3,870	Third round lost to (Australia) Nick Kyrgios [WC]
9	9	(Canada) Félix Auger-Aliassime	3,883	90	10	3,803	Second round lost to (Netherlands) Botic van de Zandschulp
10	10	(Italy) Jannik Sinner	3,495	45+90	90+24	3,474	Fourth round withdrew against (Australia) Nick Kyrgios [WC]
11	11	(Poland) Hubert Hurkacz	3,468	45	90	3,513	Fourth round lost to Andrey Rublev [7]
12	12	(United Kingdom) Cameron Norrie	3,305	90	180	3,395	Quarterfinal lost to (Spain) Carlos Alcaraz [19]
13	13	(Canada) Denis Shapovalov	3,020	45+180	45+23	2,863	Third round lost to (United States) Reilly Opelka [17]
14	14	(Argentina) Diego Schwartzman	2,660	(45)	45	2,660	Third round lost to (United States) John Isner [23]
15	15	(Spain) Roberto Bautista Agut	2,480	45+150	45+45	2,375	Third round lost to (Spain) Carlos Alcaraz [19]
16	16	(Spain) Pablo Carreño Busta	2,220	(10)	10	2,220	Second round lost to (Spain) Jaume Munar [Q]
17	17	(United States) Reilly Opelka	2,156	(0)	90	2,246	Fourth round lost to (Spain) Rafael Nadal [4]
18	18	(Georgia (country)) Nikoloz Basilashvili	2,121	250	45	1,916	Third round lost to (United Kingdom) Cameron Norrie [12]
19	19	(Spain) Carlos Alcaraz	2,056	(2)	360	2,414	Semifinal lost to (Spain) Rafael Nadal [4]
20	20	(United States) Taylor Fritz	2,010	45+90	1,000+45	2,920	Champion, defeated (Spain) Rafael Nadal [4]
21	21	(Italy) Lorenzo Sonego	1,937	45	10	1,902	Second round lost to (France) Benjamin Bonzi
22	22	Aslan Karatsev	1,933	15+20+500	10+10+10	1,428	Second round lost to (United States) Steve Johnson [WC]
23	23	(United States) John Isner	1,801	45	90	1,846	Fourth round lost to (Bulgaria) Grigor Dimitrov [33]
24	24	(Croatia) Marin Čilić	1,785	(10)	10	1,785	Second round lost to (Serbia) Miomir Kecmanović
25	26	Karen Khachanov	1,680	45+45	10+23	1,623	Second round lost to (United States) Jenson Brooksby
26	28	(France) Gaël Monfils	1,633	(0)	90	1,723	Fourth round lost to (Spain) Carlos Alcaraz [19]
27	29	(United Kingdom) Daniel Evans	1,542	(20)	45	1,567	Third round lost to (Spain) Rafael Nadal [4]
28	30	(United States) Frances Tiafoe	1,463	20+45	45+10	1,453	Third round lost to Andrey Rublev [7]
29	31	(Australia) Alex de Minaur	1,451	(10)	90	1,531	Fourth round lost to (United States) Taylor Fritz [20]
30	32	(South Africa) Lloyd Harris	1,393	32+310	45+5	1,101	Third round lost to (Italy) Matteo Berrettini [6]
31	33	(Kazakhstan) Alexander Bublik	1,391	(20)	45	1,416	Third round lost to (Bulgaria) Grigor Dimitrov [33]
32	34	(Argentina) Federico Delbonis	1,382	90	10	1,302	Second round lost to (Australia) Nick Kyrgios [WC]
33	35	(Bulgaria) Grigor Dimitrov	1,381	90	180	1,471	Quarterfinal lost to Andrey Rublev [7]

† This column shows either (a) the player's ranking points dropping on March 14 or March 21, 2022, or (b) his 19th best result (shown in brackets). Only ranking points counting towards the player's ranking as of March 7, 2022, are reflected in the column.
‡ The player is defending points from a 2019 ATP Challenger Tour tournament (Phoenix)

=== Withdrawn players ===
The following player would have been seeded, but withdrew before the tournament began.

Rank	Player	Points before	Points dropped	Points after	Withdrawal reason
25	(Chile) Cristian Garín	1,716	250	1,466	Fatigue
27	(Switzerland) Roger Federer	1,665	45	1,620	Right knee surgery

== Other entry information ==
=== Wildcards ===
- (United States) Steve Johnson
- (Australia) Nick Kyrgios
- (United Kingdom) Andy Murray
- (United States) Sam Querrey
- (United States) Jack Sock

=== Protected ranking ===
- (Slovenia) Aljaž Bedene
- (Croatia) Borna Ćorić
- (Uruguay) Pablo Cuevas

=== Qualifiers ===
- (United Kingdom) Liam Broady
- (Japan) Taro Daniel
- (United States) Christopher Eubanks
- (Germany) Philipp Kohlschreiber
- (Australia) Thanasi Kokkinakis
- (Kazakhstan) Mikhail Kukushkin
- (Czech Republic) Tomáš Macháč
- (Spain) Jaume Munar
- (Denmark) Holger Rune
- (United States) Tennys Sandgren
- (China) Shang Juncheng
- (United States) J. J. Wolf

=== Lucky losers ===
- (Australia) John Millman
- (Portugal) João Sousa

=== Withdrawals ===
- (Serbia) Novak Djokovic → replaced by (Portugal) João Sousa
- (Australia) James Duckworth → replaced by (Argentina) Juan Manuel Cerúndolo
- (Switzerland) Roger Federer → replaced by (Argentina) Facundo Bagnis
- (Chile) Cristian Garín → replaced by (Poland) Kamil Majchrzak
- (Belarus) Ilya Ivashka → replaced by (Australia) John Millman
- (Italy) Gianluca Mager → replaced by (Germany) Oscar Otte
- (Slovakia) Alex Molčan → replaced by (Australia) Jordan Thompson
- (Japan) Kei Nishikori → replaced by (France) Richard Gasquet
- (Spain) Albert Ramos Viñolas → replaced by (Germany) Daniel Altmaier
- (Austria) Dominic Thiem → replaced by (Switzerland) Henri Laaksonen
- (France) Jo-Wilfried Tsonga → replaced by (Spain) Roberto Carballés Baena
- (Sweden) Mikael Ymer → replaced by (United States) Brandon Nakashima

== Qualifying ==
=== Seeds ===
1. (Australia) John Millman (qualifying competition, lucky loser)
2. (Portugal) João Sousa (qualifying competition, lucky loser)
3. (Denmark) Holger Rune (qualified)
4. (South Africa) Kevin Anderson (first round)
5. (Italy) Marco Cecchinato (first round)
6. (Japan) Yoshihito Nishioka (qualifying competition)
7. (Australia) Thanasi Kokkinakis (qualified)
8. (Spain) Jaume Munar (qualified)
9. (Argentina) Francisco Cerúndolo (first round)
10. (United States) Denis Kudla (qualifying competition)
11. (Colombia) Daniel Elahi Galán (qualifying competition)
12. (Japan) Taro Daniel (qualified)

13. (Spain) Feliciano López (first round)
14. (Moldova) Radu Albot (first round)
15. (United States) Stefan Kozlov (qualifying competition)
16. (Italy) Andreas Seppi (first round)
17. (United Kingdom) Liam Broady (qualified)
18. (Australia) Aleksandar Vukic (qualifying competition)
19. (Germany) Mats Moraing (qualifying competition, retired)
20. (Canada) Vasek Pospisil (qualifying competition)
21. (Sweden) Elias Ymer (first round)
22. (Germany) Philipp Kohlschreiber (qualified)
23. (Ecuador) Emilio Gómez (first round)
24. (United States) Bjorn Fratangelo (first round)

Click on the seed number of a player to go to their draw section.

=== Qualifiers ===
1. (United States) Tennys Sandgren
2. (United States) Christopher Eubanks
3. (Denmark) Holger Rune
4. (United Kingdom) Liam Broady
5. (Czech Republic) Tomáš Macháč
6. (Kazakhstan) Mikhail Kukushkin
7. (Australia) Thanasi Kokkinakis
8. (Spain) Jaume Munar
9. (China) Shang Juncheng
10. (Germany) Philipp Kohlschreiber
11. (United States) J. J. Wolf
12. (Japan) Taro Daniel

=== Lucky losers ===
1. (Portugal) João Sousa
2. (Australia) John Millman

=== Qualifying draw ===
==== First qualifier ====
First round
1	(Australia) John Millman	6	6
WC	(United States) Brandon Holt	4	0
(United States) Tennys Sandgren	4	6	6
24	(United States) Bjorn Fratangelo	6	4	2

Qualifying competition
1	(Australia) John Millman	7^{7}	6^{8}	6^{5}
(United States) Tennys Sandgren	6^{3}	7^{10}	7^{7}

==== Second qualifier ====
First round
2	(Portugal) João Sousa	5	7^{7}	7^{7}
(Australia) Max Purcell	7	6^{5}	6^{4}
(United States) Christopher Eubanks	4	6	7
13	(Spain) Feliciano López	6	3	5

Qualifying competition
2	(Portugal) João Sousa	6^{4}	6^{4}
(United States) Christopher Eubanks	7^{7}	7^{7}

==== Third qualifier ====
First round
3	(Denmark) Holger Rune	6	3	6
(United States) Mitchell Krueger	4	6	3
WC	(United States) Sebastian Sec	3	7^{7}	2
15	(United States) Stefan Kozlov	6	6^{4}	6

Qualifying competition
3	(Denmark) Holger Rune	6	6
15	(United States) Stefan Kozlov	4	2

==== Fourth qualifier ====
First round
4	(South Africa) Kevin Anderson	6	2	2
(Australia) Christopher O'Connell	3	6	6
(India) Ramkumar Ramanathan	2	6	4
17	(United Kingdom) Liam Broady	6	3	6

Qualifying competition
(Australia) Christopher O'Connell	6^{7}	0
17	(United Kingdom) Liam Broady	7^{9}	6

==== Fifth qualifier ====
First round
5	(Italy) Marco Cecchinato	1	2
(Ukraine) Illya Marchenko	6	6
(Czech Republic) Tomáš Macháč	6	7
14	(Moldova) Radu Albot	4	5

Qualifying competition
(Ukraine) Illya Marchenko	7	3	3
(Czech Republic) Tomáš Macháč	5	6	6

==== Sixth qualifier ====
First round
6	(Japan) Yoshihito Nishioka	6	3	6
(France) Hugo Grenier	1	6	4
(Kazakhstan) Mikhail Kukushkin	6	6
16	(Italy) Andreas Seppi	2	4

Qualifying competition
6	(Japan) Yoshihito Nishioka	2	6^{4}
(Kazakhstan) Mikhail Kukushkin	6	7^{7}

==== Seventh qualifier ====
First round
7	(Australia) Thanasi Kokkinakis	6	6
(Italy) Thomas Fabbiano	3	4
Egor Gerasimov	6	4	4
20	(Canada) Vasek Pospisil	4	6	6

Qualifying competition
7	(Australia) Thanasi Kokkinakis	7^{7}	7
20	(Canada) Vasek Pospisil	6^{5}	5

==== Eighth qualifier ====
First round
8	(Spain) Jaume Munar	6	6
WC	(United States) Bruno Kuzuhara	1	4
(Italy) Salvatore Caruso	2	2
18	(Australia) Aleksandar Vukic	6	6

Qualifying competition
8	(Spain) Jaume Munar	6	6
18	(Australia) Aleksandar Vukic	3	2

==== Ninth qualifier ====
First round
9	(Argentina) Francisco Cerúndolo	6^{4}	4
WC	(China) Shang Juncheng	7^{7}	6
PR	(Germany) Yannick Maden	4^{r}
19	(Germany) Mats Moraing	5

Qualifying competition
WC	(China) Shang Juncheng	6	0
19	(Germany) Mats Moraing	3	0^{r}

==== Tenth qualifier ====
First round
10	(United States) Denis Kudla	6	6
(Chinese Taipei) Tseng Chun-hsin	1	4
(Australia) Alex Bolt	6	4	4
22	(Germany) Philipp Kohlschreiber	2	6	6

Qualifying competition
10	(United States) Denis Kudla	6	3	3
22	(Germany) Philipp Kohlschreiber	0	6	6

==== Eleventh qualifier ====
First round
11	(Colombia) Daniel Elahi Galán	6	7
(Kazakhstan) Dmitry Popko	4	5
PR	(United States) J. J. Wolf	6	6
23	(Ecuador) Emilio Gómez	1	3

Qualifying competition
11	(Colombia) Daniel Elahi Galán	6^{3}	2
PR	(United States) J. J. Wolf	7^{7}	6

==== Twelfth qualifier ====
First round
12	(Japan) Taro Daniel	7	7
WC	(United States) Emilio Nava	5	5
(Germany) Daniel Masur	6	7
21	(Sweden) Elias Ymer	4	5

Qualifying competition
12	(Japan) Taro Daniel	6	6
(Germany) Daniel Masur	4	2
