= 2025 BNP Paribas Primrose Bordeaux =

- Date: 13 – 18 May
- Edition: 16th
- Surface: Clay
- Location: Bordeaux, France

Champions

Singles
- (France) Giovanni Mpetshi Perricard

Doubles
- (Portugal) Francisco Cabral / (Austria) Lucas Miedler
- BNP Paribas Primrose Bordeaux

The 2025 BNP Paribas Primrose Bordeaux was a professional tennis tournament played on clay courts. It was the 16th edition of the tournament and an ATP Challenger Tour 175 event on the 2025 ATP Challenger Tour. It took place in Bordeaux, France between 13 and 18 May 2025.

== Singles main-draw entrants ==
=== Seeds ===
Country	Player	Rank^{1}	Seed
USA	Brandon Nakashima	29	1
ARG	Sebastián Báez	33	2
NED	Tallon Griekspoor	35	3
FRA	Giovanni Mpetshi Perricard	36	4
FRA	Quentin Halys	52	5
BIH	Damir Džumhur	69	6
FRA	Hugo Gaston	78	7
USA	Aleksandar Kovacevic	80	8

- ^{1} Rankings are as of 5 May 2025.

=== Other entrants ===
The following players received wildcards into the singles main draw:

- (France) Térence Atmane
- (France) Mathias Bourgue
- (Switzerland) Stan Wawrinka

The following players received entry into the singles main draw as alternates:

- (Georgia (country)) Nikoloz Basilashvili
- (France) Hugo Grenier
- (Lebanon) Benjamin Hassan
- (Kazakhstan) Mikhail Kukushkin
- (India) Sumit Nagal

The following players received entry from the qualifying draw:

- (France) Grégoire Barrère
- (France) Calvin Hemery
- (Spain) Albert Ramos Viñolas
- (Spain) Bernabé Zapata Miralles

== Champions ==
=== Singles ===
- (France) Giovanni Mpetshi Perricard def. (Georgia (country)) Nikoloz Basilashvili 6–3, 6–7^{(5–7)}, 7–5.

=== Doubles ===
- (Portugal) Francisco Cabral / (Austria) Lucas Miedler def. (India) Yuki Bhambri / (United States) Robert Galloway 7–6^{(7–1)}, 7–6^{(7–2)}.
