= 2023 Qatar ExxonMobil Open – Singles =

Singles
- 2023 Qatar ExxonMobil Open

Final
- Champion: Daniil Medvedev
- Runner-up: (United Kingdom) Andy Murray
- Score: 6–4, 6–4

Details
- Draw: 28 (4 Q / 3 WC )
- Seeds: 8

Events
Singles	Doubles
- ATP Qatar Open

Daniil Medvedev defeated Andy Murray in the final, 6–4, 6–4, to win the singles tennis title at the 2023 ATP Qatar Open. It was his second ATP Tour title in as many weeks. En route to the final, Murray saved eight match points - three in his first-round match against Lorenzo Sonego and five in the semifinals against Jiří Lehečka.

Roberto Bautista Agut was the defending champion, but lost in the second round to Christopher O'Connell.

== Seeds ==
The top four seeds received a bye into the second round.

1. Andrey Rublev (quarterfinals)
2. (Canada) Félix Auger-Aliassime (semifinals)
3. Daniil Medvedev (champion)
4. (Germany) Alexander Zverev (second round)
5. (Spain) Roberto Bautista Agut (second round)
6. (United Kingdom) Dan Evans (first round)
7. (Spain) Alejandro Davidovich Fokina (quarterfinals)
8. (Netherlands) Botic van de Zandschulp (second round)

== Draw ==
Key

- Q = Qualifier
- WC = Wild card
- LL = Lucky loser
- Alt = Alternate
- ITF = ITF entry
- PR = Protected ranking
- SR = Special ranking
- SE = Special exempt
- JE = Junior exempt
- JR = Junior Accelerator Programme entrant
- CO = College Accelerator Programme entrant
- NG = Next Gen Accelerator Program entrant
- w/o = Walkover
- r = Retired
- d = Defaulted

=== Finals ===
Semifinals
(Czech Republic) Jiří Lehečka	0	6	6^{6}
WC	(United Kingdom) Andy Murray	6	3	7^{8}
3	Daniil Medvedev	6	7^{9}
2	(Canada) Félix Auger-Aliassime	4	6^{7}

Final
WC	(United Kingdom) Andy Murray	4	4
3	Daniil Medvedev	6	6

=== Top half ===
First round
(Netherlands) T Griekspoor	7^{7}	4	7^{7}
(France) Q Halys	6^{4}	6	6^{5}
Q	(Bosnia and Herzegovina) D Džumhur	3	6^{3}
(Czech Republic) J Lehečka	6	7^{7}
(Finland) E Ruusuvuori	7	6
6	(United Kingdom) D Evans	5	4
(Italy) L Sonego	6	1	6^{4}
WC	(United Kingdom) A Murray	4	6	7^{7}
LL	(Georgia (country)) N Basilashvili	6^{3}	7^{10}	4
Q	(France) A Müller	7^{7}	6^{8}	6
I Ivashka	2	5
8	(Netherlands) B van de Zandschulp	6	7

Second round
1	A Rublev	1	6	7^{8}
(Netherlands) T Griekspoor	6	1	6^{6}
(Czech Republic) J Lehečka	6	7^{7}
(Finland) E Ruusuvuori	2	6^{2}
4	(Germany) A Zverev	6^{5}	6	5
WC	(United Kingdom) A Murray	7^{7}	2	7
Q	(France) A Müller	6	6
8	(Netherlands) B van de Zandschulp	2	4

Quarterfinals
1	A Rublev	6	4	3
(Czech Republic) J Lehečka	4	6	6
WC	(United Kingdom) A Murray	4	6	6
Q	(France) A Müller	6	1	2

Semifinals
(Czech Republic) J Lehečka	0	6	6^{6}
WC	(United Kingdom) A Murray	6	3	7^{8}

=== Bottom half ===
First round
5	(Spain) R Bautista Agut	7^{9}	5	6
(Hungary) M Fucsovics	6^{7}	7	4
WC	(Spain) F Verdasco	1	6	0
(Australia) C O'Connell	6	3	6
Q	(Ukraine) O Krutykh	0	6	6^{2}
Q	(United Kingdom) L Broady	6	4	7^{7}
7	(Spain) A Davidovich Fokina	6	6
(France) C Lestienne	4	3
WC	(Jordan) A Shelbayh	3	6	4
(South Korea) S-w Kwon	6	3	6
A Karatsev	6^{4}	0^{r}
(Australia) J Kubler	7^{7}	1

Second round
5	(Spain) R Bautista Agut	6	6^{5}	4
(Australia) C O'Connell	3	7^{7}	6
Q	(United Kingdom) L Broady	4	3
3	D Medvedev	6	6
7	(Spain) A Davidovich Fokina	6	6
(South Korea) S-w Kwon	3	2
(Australia) J Kubler	6	1	4
2	(Canada) F Auger-Aliassime	4	6	6

Quarterfinals
(Australia) C O'Connell	2	6	5
3	D Medvedev	6	4	7
7	(Spain) A Davidovich Fokina	4	6^{5}
2	(Canada) F Auger-Aliassime	6	7^{7}

Semifinals
3	D Medvedev	6	7^{9}
2	(Canada) F Auger-Aliassime	4	6^{7}

== Qualifying ==
=== Seeds ===
1. (Georgia (country)) Nikoloz Basilashvili (qualifying competition, lucky loser)
2. (China) Zhang Zhizhen (first round)
3. (Italy) Francesco Passaro (first round)
4. (Italy) Matteo Arnaldi (first round)
5. Alexander Shevchenko (first round)
6. (Czech Republic) Tomáš Macháč (qualifying competition)
7. Pavel Kotov (qualifying competition)
8. (United Kingdom) Liam Broady (qualified)

=== Qualifiers ===
1. (United Kingdom) Liam Broady
2. (France) Alexandre Müller
3. (Bosnia and Herzegovina) Damir Džumhur
4. (Ukraine) Oleksii Krutykh

=== Lucky loser ===
1. (Georgia (country)) Nikoloz Basilashvili

=== Qualifying draw ===
==== First qualifier ====
First round
1	(Georgia (country)) Nikoloz Basilashvili	6	7
WC	(Turkey) Cem İlkel	3	5
WC	(Qatar) Mubarak Shannan Zayid	1	1
8	(United Kingdom) Liam Broady	6	6

Qualifying competition
1	(Georgia (country)) Nikoloz Basilashvili	4	3
8	(United Kingdom) Liam Broady	6	6

==== Second qualifier ====
First round
2	(China) Zhang Zhizhen	6	6^{5}	0
(France) Alexandre Müller	4	7^{7}	6
(Czech Republic) Vít Kopřiva	6^{2}	6^{7}
6	(Czech Republic) Tomáš Macháč	7^{7}	7^{9}

Qualifying competition
(France) Alexandre Müller	4	7^{9}	6
6	(Czech Republic) Tomáš Macháč	6	6^{7}	1

==== Third qualifier ====
First round
3	(Italy) Francesco Passaro	4	6	6^{2}
(Bosnia and Herzegovina) Damir Džumhur	6	4	7^{7}
(Finland) Otto Virtanen	6	6
5	Alexander Shevchenko	4	4

Qualifying competition
(Bosnia and Herzegovina) Damir Džumhur	6	7
(Finland) Otto Virtanen	3	5

==== Fourth qualifier ====
First round
4	(Italy) Matteo Arnaldi	2	4
(Ukraine) Oleksii Krutykh	6	6
Alt	(India) Yuki Bhambri	6	3	5
7	Pavel Kotov	4	6	7

Qualifying competition
(Ukraine) Oleksii Krutykh	1	6	6
7	Pavel Kotov	6	3	3
