= 2022 Qatar ExxonMobil Open =

- Date: 14–19 February 2022
- Edition: 30th
- Category: ATP Tour 250 series
- Draw: 32S/16D
- Prize money: $1,176,595
- Surface: Hard / outdoor
- Location: Doha, Qatar
- Venue: Khalifa International Tennis and Squash Complex

Champions

Singles
- (Spain) Roberto Bautista Agut

Doubles
- (Netherlands) Wesley Koolhof / (United Kingdom) Neal Skupski
- Qatar ExxonMobil Open

The 2022 Qatar Open (also known as 2022 Qatar ExxonMobil Open for sponsorship reasons) was the 30th edition of the Qatar Open, a men's tennis tournament played on outdoor hard courts. It was part of the ATP Tour 250 of the 2022 ATP Tour, and took place at the Khalifa International Tennis and Squash Complex in Doha, Qatar from 14 February until 19 February 2022. Second-seeded Roberto Bautista Agut won the singles title.

== Finals ==
=== Singles ===
- (Spain) Roberto Bautista Agut defeated (Georgia (country)) Nikoloz Basilashvili, 6–3, 6–4

=== Doubles ===
- (Netherlands) Wesley Koolhof / (United Kingdom) Neal Skupski defeated (India) Rohan Bopanna / (Canada) Denis Shapovalov 7–6^{(7–4)}, 6–1.

== Points and prize money ==
=== Point distribution ===
Event	W	F	SF	QF	Round of 16	Round of 32	Q	Q2	Q1
Singles	250	150	90	45	20	0	12	6	0
Doubles	250	150	90	45	0	—N/a	—N/a	—N/a	—N/a

=== Prize money ===
Event	W	F	SF	QF	Round of 16	Round of 32	Q2	Q1
Singles	$114,875	$80,410	$53,255	$35,510	$22,975	$12,530	$6,265	$3,130
Doubles*	$40,720	$29,240	$18,800	$12,530	$7,310	—N/a	—N/a	—N/a

_{*per team}

== Singles main-draw entrants ==
=== Seeds ===
Country	Player	Rank^{1}	Seed
CAN	Denis Shapovalov	12	1
ESP	Roberto Bautista Agut	17	2
GEO	Nikoloz Basilashvili	21	3
CRO	Marin Čilić	24	4
GBR	Dan Evans	27	5
RUS	Karen Khachanov	28	6
KAZ	Alexander Bublik	31	7
RSA	Lloyd Harris	35	8

- ^{1} Rankings are as of 7 February 2022.

=== Other entrants ===
The following players received wildcards into the singles main draw:

- (Croatia) Marin Čilić
- (Tunisia) Malek Jaziri
- (United Kingdom) Andy Murray

The following players received entry from the qualifying draw:

- (United States) Christopher Eubanks
- (Italy) Thomas Fabbiano
- (Slovakia) Jozef Kovalík
- (Australia) Christopher O'Connell

The following players received entry as lucky losers:

- (Portugal) João Sousa
- (Sweden) Elias Ymer

=== Withdrawals ===
Before the tournament

- (Australia) Alex de Minaur → replaced by (Slovakia) Alex Molčan
- (Serbia) Filip Krajinović → replaced by (Sweden) Elias Ymer
- (France) Gaël Monfils → replaced by (Finland) Emil Ruusuvuori
- (Italy) Lorenzo Musetti → replaced by (Portugal) João Sousa
- (Germany) Jan-Lennard Struff → replaced by (Czech Republic) Jiří Veselý

== Doubles main-draw entrants ==
=== Seeds ===
Country	Player	Country	Player	Rank^{1}	Seed
CRO	Nikola Mektić	CRO	Mate Pavić	3	1
CRO	Ivan Dodig	NZL	Michael Venus	28	2
NED	Wesley Koolhof	GBR	Neal Skupski	40	3
BEL	Sander Gillé	BEL	Joran Vliegen	59	4

- ^{1} Rankings are as of 7 February 2022.

=== Other entrants ===
The following pairs received wildcards into the doubles main draw:

- (Qatar) Issa Alharrasi / (Ukraine) Illya Marchenko
- (Tunisia) Malek Jaziri / (Qatar) Mubarak Zaid

The following pair received entry as alternates:

- (Finland) Emil Ruusuvuori / (Sweden) Elias Ymer

=== Withdrawals ===
Before the tournament

- (South Korea) Kwon Soon-woo / (Italy) Lorenzo Musetti → replaced by (Finland) Emil Ruusuvuori / (Sweden) Elias Ymer
- (France) Arthur Rinderknech / (Germany) Jan-Lennard Struff → replaced by (France) Manuel Guinard / (France) Arthur Rinderknech
