= 2025 BNP Paribas Primrose Bordeaux – Doubles =

Doubles
- 2025 BNP Paribas Primrose Bordeaux

Final
- Champions: (Portugal) Francisco Cabral (Austria) Lucas Miedler
- Runners-up: (India) Yuki Bhambri (United States) Robert Galloway
- Score: 7–6^{(7–1)}, 7–6^{(7–2)}

Events
Singles	Doubles
← 2024 ·	BNP Paribas Primrose Bordeaux	· 2026 →

Julian Cash and Robert Galloway were the defending champions, but only Galloway chose to defend his title, partnering Yuki Bhambri. They lost in the final to Francisco Cabral and Lucas Miedler.

Cabral and Miedler won the title after defeating Bhambri and Galloway 7–6^{(7–1)}, 7–6^{(7–2)} in the final.

== Seeds ==
1. (United States) Nathaniel Lammons / (United States) Jackson Withrow (first round)
2. (India) Yuki Bhambri / (United States) Robert Galloway (final)
3. (Brazil) Rafael Matos / (Brazil) Marcelo Melo (semifinals)
4. (Portugal) Francisco Cabral / (Austria) Lucas Miedler (champions)

== Draw ==
=== Key ===
- Q = Qualifier
- WC = Wild card
- LL = Lucky loser
- Alt = Alternate
- ITF = ITF entry
- PR = Protected ranking
- SR = Special ranking
- SE = Special exempt
- JE = Junior exempt
- JR = Junior Accelerator Programme entrant
- CO = College Accelerator Programme entrant
- NG = Next Gen Accelerator Program entrant
- w/o = Walkover
- r = Retired
- d = Defaulted

=== Draw ===
First round
1	(United States) N Lammons (United States) J Withrow	6	4	[9]
(France) G Blancaneaux (France) J Eysseric	3	6	[11]
(Canada) C Harper (United States) R Seggerman	6	6
(Croatia) I Dodig (Brazil) O Luz	4	0
4	(Portugal) F Cabral (Austria) L Miedler	7^{7}	6
(France) G Jacq (Australia) MC Romios	6^{5}	4
Alt	(Belgium) M Geerts (Australia) R Hijikata
WC	(France) P-H Herbert (France) N Mahut	w/o
(United States) R Cash (United States) JJ Tracy	7^{9}	6^{7}	[6]
(India) S Balaji (Mexico) M Reyes-Varela	6^{7}	7^{9}	[10]
(Czech Republic) P Nouza (Czech Republic) P Rikl	3	7^{7}	[7]
3	(Brazil) R Matos (Brazil) M Melo	6	6^{4}	[10]
(France) Q Halys (France) A Olivetti	6	6
PR	(Spain) Í Cervantes (Argentina) G Durán	4	3
(Switzerland) J Paul (Netherlands) D Pel	0	6^{1}
2	(India) Y Bhambri (United States) R Galloway	6	7^{7}

Quarterfinals
(France) G Blancaneaux (France) J Eysseric	6	6^{4}	[8]
(Canada) C Harper (United States) R Seggerman	4	7^{7}	[10]
4	(Portugal) F Cabral (Austria) L Miedler	4	6	[10]
WC	(France) P-H Herbert (France) N Mahut	6	3	[5]
(India) S Balaji (Mexico) M Reyes-Varela	2	4
3	(Brazil) R Matos (Brazil) M Melo	6	6
(France) Q Halys (France) A Olivetti	5	3
2	(India) Y Bhambri (United States) R Galloway	7	6

Semifinals
(Canada) C Harper (United States) R Seggerman	3	6	[8]
4	(Portugal) F Cabral (Austria) L Miedler	6	3	[10]
3	(Brazil) R Matos (Brazil) M Melo	3	6^{3}
2	(India) Y Bhambri (United States) R Galloway	6	7^{7}

Final
4	(Portugal) F Cabral (Austria) L Miedler	7^{7}	7^{7}
2	(India) Y Bhambri (United States) R Galloway	6^{1}	6^{2}
