= 2025 BNP Paribas Primrose Bordeaux – Singles =

Singles
- 2025 BNP Paribas Primrose Bordeaux

Final
- Champion: (France) Giovanni Mpetshi Perricard
- Runner-up: (Georgia (country)) Nikoloz Basilashvili
- Score: 6–3, 6–7^{(5–7)}, 7–5

Events
Singles	Doubles
- BNP Paribas Primrose Bordeaux

Arthur Fils was the defending champion but chose not to defend his title.

Giovanni Mpetshi Perricard won the title after defeating Nikoloz Basilashvili 6–3, 6–7^{(5–7)}, 7–5 in the final.

== Seeds ==
The top four seeds received a bye into the second round.

1. (United States) Brandon Nakashima (quarterfinals)
2. (Argentina) Sebastián Báez (second round)
3. (Netherlands) Tallon Griekspoor (semifinals)
4. (France) Giovanni Mpetshi Perricard (champion)
5. (France) Quentin Halys (second round)
6. (Bosnia and Herzegovina) Damir Džumhur (second round)
7. (France) Hugo Gaston (second round)
8. (United States) Aleksandar Kovacevic (first round)

== Draw ==
Key

- Q = Qualifier
- WC = Wild card
- LL = Lucky loser
- Alt = Alternate
- ITF = ITF entry
- PR = Protected ranking
- SR = Special ranking
- SE = Special exempt
- JE = Junior exempt
- JR = Junior Accelerator Programme entrant
- CO = College Accelerator Programme entrant
- NG = Next Gen Accelerator Program entrant
- w/o = Walkover
- r = Retired
- d = Defaulted

=== Finals ===
Semifinals
Alt	(Georgia (country)) Nikoloz Basilashvili	6	6
3	(Netherlands) Tallon Griekspoor	4	0
4	(France) Giovanni Mpetshi Perricard	7	7^{7}
(Australia) Rinky Hijikata	5	6^{5}

Final
Alt	(Georgia (country)) Nikoloz Basilashvili	3	7^{7}	5
4	(France) Giovanni Mpetshi Perricard	6	6^{5}	7

=== Top half ===
First round
Alt	(Kazakhstan) M Kukushkin	7^{8}	6
P Kotov	6^{6}	4
Alt	(Georgia (country)) N Basilashvili	6	6
Q	(Spain) A Ramos Viñolas	2	2
Q	(Spain) B Zapata Miralles	4	3
5	(France) Q Halys	6	6
WC	(Switzerland) S Wawrinka	6	2	1
(United Kingdom) B Harris	3	6	6
WC	(France) T Atmane	7	7
(Colombia) DE Galán	5	5
Alt	(India) S Nagal	3	4
7	(France) H Gaston	6	6

Second round
1	(United States) B Nakashima	6	7
Alt	(Kazakhstan) M Kukushkin	3	5
Alt	(Georgia (country)) N Basilashvili	7^{9}	7^{7}
5	(France) Q Halys	6^{7}	6^{4}
3	(Netherlands) T Griekspoor	6	6
(United Kingdom) B Harris	3	4
WC	(France) T Atmane	1	6	6
7	(France) H Gaston	6	3	3

Quarterfinals
1	(United States) B Nakashima	2	7^{7}	3
Alt	(Georgia (country)) N Basilashvili	6	6^{4}	6
3	(Netherlands) T Griekspoor	7^{7}	6^{11}	7
WC	(France) T Atmane	6^{3}	7^{13}	5

Semifinals
Alt	(Georgia (country)) N Basilashvili	6	6
3	(Netherlands) T Griekspoor	4	0

=== Bottom half ===
First round
8	(United States) A Kovacevic	5	6	3
Q	(France) C Hemery	7	3	6
(Kazakhstan) A Shevchenko	7^{7}	6
Alt	(France) H Grenier	6^{4}	1
(France) P-H Herbert	7^{7}	6
(Japan) T Daniel	6^{5}	2
6	(Bosnia and Herzegovina) D Džumhur	7^{7}	6
WC	(France) M Bourgue	6^{5}	2
Alt	(Lebanon) B Hassan	6	3
Q	(France) G Barrère	3	1^{r}
(Australia) R Hijikata	6	4	6
(United States) N Basavareddy	3	6	4

Second round
Q	(France) C Hemery	3	4
(Kazakhstan) A Shevchenko	6	6
(France) P-H Herbert	3	6^{7}
4	(France) G Mpetshi Perricard	6	7^{9}
6	(Bosnia and Herzegovina) D Džumhur	6	3	1
Alt	(Lebanon) B Hassan	3	6	6
(Australia) R Hijikata	6	3	6
2	(Argentina) S Báez	4	6	2

Quarterfinals
(Kazakhstan) A Shevchenko	5	5
4	(France) G Mpetshi Perricard	7	7
Alt	(Lebanon) B Hassan	4	6^{3}
(Australia) R Hijikata	6	7^{7}

Semifinals
4	(France) G Mpetshi Perricard	7	7^{7}
(Australia) R Hijikata	5	6^{5}
