= 2021 Qatar ExxonMobil Open – Singles =

Singles
- 2021 Qatar ExxonMobil Open

Final
- Champion: (Georgia (country)) Nikoloz Basilashvili
- Runner-up: (Spain) Roberto Bautista Agut
- Score: 7–6^{(7–5)}, 6–2

Details
- Draw: 28 (4 Q / 3 WC )
- Seeds: 8

Events
Singles	Doubles
- ATP Qatar Open

Nikoloz Basilashvili defeated Roberto Bautista Agut in the final, 7–6^{(7–5)}, 6–2 to win the men's singles tennis title at the 2021 Qatar Open. Basilashvili saved a match point against Roger Federer in the quarterfinals.

Andrey Rublev was the defending champion, but lost in the semifinals to Bautista Agut. Rublev's run to the semifinals was notable for his not hitting a single ball, having received a bye in the first round and walkovers in both the second round and quarterfinals.

This tournament marked the return of former world No. 1 Federer to the tour for the first time since the 2020 Australian Open, due to a pair of knee surgeries since then. His defeat to Basilashvili marked a record-extending 24th and final loss from match point up in his career.

== Seeds ==
The top four seeds received a bye into the second round.

1. (Austria) Dominic Thiem (quarterfinals)
2. (Switzerland) Roger Federer (quarterfinals)
3. (Russia) Andrey Rublev (semifinals)
4. (Canada) Denis Shapovalov (quarterfinals)
5. (Spain) Roberto Bautista Agut (final)
6. (Belgium) David Goffin (second round)
7. (Switzerland) Stan Wawrinka (first round)
8. (Croatia) Borna Ćorić (withdrew)

== Draw ==
Key

- Q = Qualifier
- WC = Wild card
- LL = Lucky loser
- Alt = Alternate
- ITF = ITF entry
- PR = Protected ranking
- SR = Special ranking
- SE = Special exempt
- JE = Junior exempt
- JR = Junior Accelerator Programme entrant
- CO = College Accelerator Programme entrant
- NG = Next Gen Accelerator Program entrant
- w/o = Walkover
- r = Retired
- d = Defaulted

=== Finals ===
Semifinals
5	(Spain) Roberto Bautista Agut	6	6
3	(Russia) Andrey Rublev	3	3
(United States) Taylor Fritz	6^{3}	1
(Georgia (country)) Nikoloz Basilashvili	7^{7}	6

Final
5	(Spain) Roberto Bautista Agut	6^{5}	2
(Georgia (country)) Nikoloz Basilashvili	7^{7}	6

=== Top half ===
First round
WC	(Qatar) MS Zayid	4	0
WC	(Russia) A Karatsev	6	6
Q	(India) R Ramanathan	4	2
(Kazakhstan) A Bublik	6	6
(United States) R Opelka	6	3	4
5	(Spain) R Bautista Agut	4	6	6
(France) R Gasquet	6	6
Q	(Slovenia) B Rola	4	4
(Serbia) D Lajović	6^{3}	3
(Hungary) M Fucsovics	7^{7}	6
Q	(South Africa) L Harris	7^{7}	6^{6}	7
7	(Switzerland) S Wawrinka	6^{3}	7^{8}	5

Second round
1	(Austria) D Thiem	6^{5}	6	6
WC	(Russia) A Karatsev	7^{7}	3	2
(Kazakhstan) A Bublik	4	3
5	(Spain) R Bautista Agut	6	6
3	(Russia) A Rublev	w/o
(France) R Gasquet
(Hungary) M Fucsovics	4	7^{7}	6
Q	(South Africa) L Harris	6	6^{5}	2

Quarterfinals
1	(Austria) D Thiem	6^{3}	6	4
5	(Spain) R Bautista Agut	7^{7}	2	6
3	(Russia) A Rublev	w/o
(Hungary) M Fucsovics

Semifinals
5	(Spain) R Bautista Agut	6	6
3	(Russia) A Rublev	3	3

=== Bottom half ===
First round
6	(Belgium) D Goffin	6	6
(Serbia) F Krajinović	4	4
(Italy) L Sonego	6^{5}	4
(United States) T Fritz	7^{7}	6
Q	(Australia) C O'Connell	3	4
(Canada) V Pospisil	6	6
LL	(Slovakia) N Gombos	2	5
WC	(Tunisia) M Jaziri	6	7
(Georgia (country)) N Basilashvili	2	6	6
(Australia) J Millman	6	4	2
(France) J Chardy	4	6	2
(United Kingdom) D Evans	6	1	6

Second round
6	(Belgium) D Goffin	1	7	6^{9}
(United States) T Fritz	6	5	7^{11}
(Canada) V Pospisil	5	4
4	(Canada) D Shapovalov	7	6
WC	(Tunisia) M Jaziri	2	2
(Georgia (country)) N Basilashvili	6	6
(United Kingdom) D Evans	6^{8}	6	5
2	(Switzerland) R Federer	7^{10}	3	7

Quarterfinals
(United States) T Fritz	5	6	7
4	(Canada) D Shapovalov	7	3	5
(Georgia (country)) N Basilashvili	3	6	7
2	(Switzerland) R Federer	6	1	5

Semifinals
(United States) T Fritz	6^{3}	1
(Georgia (country)) N Basilashvili	7^{7}	6

== Qualifying ==
=== Seeds ===
1. (South Africa) Lloyd Harris (qualified)
2. (Slovakia) Norbert Gombos (qualifying competition, lucky loser)
3. (Australia) Christopher O'Connell (qualified)
4. (Slovenia) Blaž Rola (qualified)
5. (Italy) Thomas Fabbiano (qualifying competition)
6. (Slovakia) Lukáš Lacko (qualifying competition)
7. (India) Ramkumar Ramanathan (qualified)
8. (Brazil) Marcelo Melo (first round)

=== Qualifiers ===
1. (South Africa) Lloyd Harris
2. (India) Ramkumar Ramanathan
3. (Australia) Christopher O'Connell
4. (Slovenia) Blaž Rola

=== Lucky loser ===
1. (Slovakia) Norbert Gombos

=== Qualifying draw ===
==== First qualifier ====
First round				Qualifying competition
				1	(South Africa) Lloyd Harris	6	6
				6	(Slovakia) Lukáš Lacko	4	3
WC	(Qatar) Mousa Shanan Zayed	1	1	6	(Slovakia) Lukáš Lacko	4	3
6	(Slovakia) Lukáš Lacko	6	6

==== Second qualifier ====
First round				Qualifying competition
				2	(Slovakia) Norbert Gombos	3	1
				7	(India) Ramkumar Ramanathan	6	6
Alt	(Denmark) Frederik Nielsen	4	1	7	(India) Ramkumar Ramanathan	6	6
7	(India) Ramkumar Ramanathan	6	6

==== Third qualifier ====
First round	Qualifying competition
	3	(Australia) Christopher O'Connell	6	7^{9}
	5	(Italy) Thomas Fabbiano	3	6^{7}

==== Fourth qualifier ====
First round				Qualifying competition
				4	(Slovenia) Blaž Rola	7^{7}	6
				Alt	(Germany) Tim Pütz	6^{5}	2
Alt	(Germany) Tim Pütz	6	6	Alt	(Germany) Tim Pütz	6^{5}	2
8/Alt	(Brazil) Marcelo Melo	3	2
