= 2023 Qatar ExxonMobil Open – Doubles =

Doubles
- 2023 Qatar ExxonMobil Open

Final
- Champions: (India) Rohan Bopanna (Australia) Matthew Ebden
- Runners-up: (France) Constant Lestienne (Netherlands) Botic van de Zandschulp
- Score: 6–7^{(5–7)}, 6–4, [10–6]

Details
- Draw: 16
- Seeds: 4

Events
Singles	Doubles
- ATP Qatar Open

Rohan Bopanna and Matthew Ebden defeated Constant Lestienne and Botic van de Zandschulp in the final, 6–7^{(5–7)}, 6–4, [10–6] to win the doubles tennis title at the 2023 ATP Qatar Open.

Wesley Koolhof and Neal Skupski were the reigning champions, but chose not to participate this year.

== Seeds ==
1. (Croatia) Nikola Mektić / (Croatia) Mate Pavić (first round)
2. (Monaco) Hugo Nys / (Poland) Jan Zieliński (quarterfinals)
3. (India) Rohan Bopanna / (Australia) Matthew Ebden (champions)
4. (Netherlands) Robin Haase / (Netherlands) Matwé Middelkoop (quarterfinals)

== Draw ==
Key

- Q = Qualifier
- WC = Wild card
- LL = Lucky loser
- Alt = Alternate
- ITF = ITF entry
- PR = Protected ranking
- SR = Special ranking
- SE = Special exempt
- JE = Junior exempt
- JR = Junior Accelerator Programme entrant
- CO = College Accelerator Programme entrant
- NG = Next Gen Accelerator Program entrant
- w/o = Walkover
- r = Retired
- d = Defaulted

=== Draw ===
First round
1	(Croatia) N Mektić (Croatia) M Pavić	2	6^{5}
Alt	(Finland) P Niklas-Salminen (Finland) E Ruusuvuori	6	7^{7}
(Australia) J Kubler (Australia) J Peers	4	7	[7]
(Netherlands) T Griekspoor (Netherlands) B Stevens	6	5	[10]
4	(Netherlands) R Haase (Netherlands) M Middelkoop	6	6
WC	(Tunisia) M Jaziri (Qatar) MS Zayid	4	2
(France) C Lestienne (Netherlands) B van de Zandschulp	6	3	[10]
(South Africa) R Klaasen (United States) H Reese	3	6	[7]
(India) Y Bhambri (India) S Myneni	6	6
(Germany) T Pütz (Germany) J-L Struff	3	4
WC	(United Kingdom) L Broady (Germany) A Zverev	7	1	[3]
3	(India) R Bopanna (Australia) M Ebden	5	6	[10]
(United Kingdom) D Evans (United Kingdom) J O'Mara	6^{5}	7	[10]
I Ivashka; A Rublev	7^{7}	5	[7]
(Czech Republic) R Jebavý (Czech Republic) A Pavlásek	4	6^{4}
2	(Monaco) H Nys (Poland) J Zieliński	6	7^{7}

Quarterfinals
Alt	(Finland) P Niklas-Salminen (Finland) E Ruusuvuori	7^{7}	6
(Netherlands) T Griekspoor (Netherlands) B Stevens	6^{4}	4
4	(Netherlands) R Haase (Netherlands) M Middelkoop	3	6	[8]
(France) C Lestienne (Netherlands) B van de Zandschulp	6	1	[10]
(India) Y Bhambri (India) S Myneni	6	4	[9]
3	(India) R Bopanna (Australia) M Ebden	1	6	[11]
(United Kingdom) D Evans (United Kingdom) J O'Mara	7^{7}	7
2	(Monaco) H Nys (Poland) J Zieliński	6^{3}	5

Semifinals
Alt	(Finland) P Niklas-Salminen (Finland) E Ruusuvuori	3	7	[8]
(France) C Lestienne (Netherlands) B van de Zandschulp	6	5	[10]
3	(India) R Bopanna (Australia) M Ebden	6	6
(United Kingdom) D Evans (United Kingdom) J O'Mara	4	3

Final
(France) C Lestienne (Netherlands) B van de Zandschulp	7^{7}	4	[6]
3	(India) R Bopanna (Australia) M Ebden	6^{5}	6	[10]
