= Issa Al-Harrasi =

Qatari tennis player (born 1999)

- Full name: Issa Shanan Al-Harrasi
- Country (sports): Qatar
- Born: 19 August 1999 (age 26)
- Prize money: $2,743

Singles
- Career record: 0–0 (at ATP Tour level, Grand Slam level, and in Davis Cup)
- Career titles: 0

Doubles
- Career record: 0–1 (at ATP Tour level, Grand Slam level, and in Davis Cup)
- Career titles: 0
- Highest ranking: No. 1829 (25 October 2021)
- Current ranking: No. 1957 (14 February 2022)
- Last updated on: 14 February 2022.

Issa Shanan Al-Harrasi (born 19 August 1999) is a Qatari tennis player.

Alharrasi has a career high ATP doubles ranking of 1829 achieved on 25 October 2021.

Alharrasi made his ATP main draw debut at the 2022 Qatar ExxonMobil Open after receiving a wildcard into the doubles main draw with Illya Marchenko. He also represents Qatar at the Davis Cup, where he has a W/L record of 1–2.
