= ATP Qatar Open =

Coordinates: 25.312°N 51.514°E

Qatar Open

ATP Tour
- Founded: 1993; 33 years ago
- Location: Doha; Qatar
- Venue: Khalifa International Tennis and Squash Complex
- Category: ATP 250 / ATP International Series / ATP World Series (1993–2024); ATP 500 (2025–present)
- Surface: Hard – outdoors
- Draw: 32S / 16Q / 16D
- Prize money: US$2,833,335 (2026)
- Website: ATPQatarOpen.com

Current champions (2026)
- Men's singles: (Spain) Carlos Alcaraz
- Men's doubles: (Finland) Harri Heliövaara (United Kingdom) Henry Patten

The Qatar Open, currently known as the Qatar ExxonMobil Open for sponsorship reasons, is a professional tennis ATP 500 tournament played on outdoor hardcourts. It is held annually in January at the Khalifa International Tennis and Squash Complex in Doha, Qatar, since 1993. It was part of the ATP Tour 250 series on the ATP Tour. In 2025, the tournament was upgraded to an ATP 500-level event.

== Past finals ==
=== Singles ===
Year	Champion	Runner-up	Score
↓ ATP Tour 250 (Note: Known as World Series from 1990 till 1999. International Series from 2000 till 2008.) ↓
1993	(Germany) Boris Becker	(Croatia) Goran Ivanišević	7–6^{(7–4)}, 4–6, 7–5
1994	(Sweden) Stefan Edberg	(Netherlands) Paul Haarhuis	6–3, 6–2
1995	(Sweden) Stefan Edberg (2)	(Sweden) Magnus Larsson	7–6^{(7–4)}, 6–1
1996	(Czech Republic) Petr Korda	(Morocco) Younes El Aynaoui	7–6^{(7–5)}, 2–6, 7–6^{(7–5)}
1997	(United States) Jim Courier	(United Kingdom) Tim Henman	7–5, 6–7^{(5–7)}, 6–2
1998	(Czech Republic) Petr Korda (2)	(France) Fabrice Santoro	6–0, 6–3
1999	(Germany) Rainer Schüttler	(United Kingdom) Tim Henman	6–4, 5–7, 6–1
2000	(France) Fabrice Santoro	(Germany) Rainer Schüttler	3–6, 7–5, 3–0 ret.
2001	(Chile) Marcelo Ríos	(Czech Republic) Bohdan Ulihrach	6–3, 2–6, 6–3
2002	(Morocco) Younes El Aynaoui	(Spain) Félix Mantilla	4–6, 6–2, 6–2
2003	(Austria) Stefan Koubek	(United States) Jan-Michael Gambill	6–4, 6–4
2004	(France) Nicolas Escudé	(Croatia) Ivan Ljubičić	6–3, 7–6^{(7–4)}
2005	(Switzerland) Roger Federer	(Croatia) Ivan Ljubičić	6–3, 6–1
2006	(Switzerland) Roger Federer (2)	(France) Gaël Monfils	6–3, 7–6^{(7–5)}
2007	(Croatia) Ivan Ljubičić	(United Kingdom) Andy Murray	6–4, 6–4
2008	(United Kingdom) Andy Murray	(Switzerland) Stan Wawrinka	6–4, 4–6, 6–2
2009	(United Kingdom) Andy Murray (2)	(United States) Andy Roddick	6–4, 6–2
2010	(Russia) Nikolay Davydenko	(Spain) Rafael Nadal	0–6, 7–6^{(10–8)}, 6–4
2011	(Switzerland) Roger Federer (3)	(Russia) Nikolay Davydenko	6–3, 6–4
2012	(France) Jo-Wilfried Tsonga	(France) Gaël Monfils	7–5, 6–3
2013	(France) Richard Gasquet	(Russia) Nikolay Davydenko	3–6, 7–6^{(7–4)}, 6–3
2014	(Spain) Rafael Nadal	(France) Gaël Monfils	6–1, 6–7^{(5–7)}, 6–2
2015	(Spain) David Ferrer	(Czech Republic) Tomáš Berdych	6–4, 7–5
2016	(Serbia) Novak Djokovic	(Spain) Rafael Nadal	6–1, 6–2
2017	(Serbia) Novak Djokovic (2)	(United Kingdom) Andy Murray	6–3, 5–7, 6–4
2018	(France) Gaël Monfils	(Russia) Andrey Rublev	6–2, 6–3
2019	(Spain) Roberto Bautista Agut	(Czech Republic) Tomáš Berdych	6–4, 3–6, 6–3
2020	(Russia) Andrey Rublev	(France) Corentin Moutet	6–2, 7–6^{(7–3)}
2021	(Georgia (country)) Nikoloz Basilashvili	(Spain) Roberto Bautista Agut	7–6^{(7–5)}, 6–2
2022	(Spain) Roberto Bautista Agut (2)	(Georgia (country)) Nikoloz Basilashvili	6–3, 6–4
2023	(Note: Competed under no flag due to the Russian invasion of Ukraine.) Daniil Medvedev	(United Kingdom) Andy Murray	6–4, 6–4
2024	Karen Khachanov	(Czech Republic) Jakub Menšík	7–6^{(14–12)}, 6–4
↓ ATP Tour 500 ↓
2025	Andrey Rublev (2)	(United Kingdom) Jack Draper	7–5, 5–7, 6–1
2026	(Spain) Carlos Alcaraz	(France) Arthur Fils	6–2, 6–1

=== Doubles ===
Year	Champions	Runners-up	Score
↓ ATP Tour 250 ↓
1993	(Germany) Boris Becker (Germany) Patrik Kühnen	(United States) Shelby Cannon (United States) Scott Melville	6–2, 6–4
1994	(France) Olivier Delaître (France) Stéphane Simian	(United States) Shelby Cannon (South Africa) Byron Talbot	6–3, 6–3
1995	(Sweden) Stefan Edberg (Sweden) Magnus Larsson	(Russia) Andrei Olhovskiy (Netherlands) Jan Siemerink	7–6, 6–2
1996	(The Bahamas) Mark Knowles (Canada) Daniel Nestor	(Netherlands) Jacco Eltingh (Netherlands) Paul Haarhuis	7–6, 6–3
1997	(Netherlands) Jacco Eltingh (Netherlands) Paul Haarhuis	(Sweden) Patrik Fredriksson (Sweden) Magnus Norman	6–3, 6–2
1998	(India) Mahesh Bhupathi (India) Leander Paes	(France) Olivier Delaître (France) Fabrice Santoro	6–4, 3–6, 6–4
1999	(United States) Alex O'Brien (United States) Jared Palmer	(South Africa) Piet Norval (Zimbabwe) Kevin Ullyett	6–3, 6–4
2000	(The Bahamas) Mark Knowles (2) (Belarus) Max Mirnyi	(United States) Alex O'Brien (United States) Jared Palmer	6–3, 6–4
2001	(The Bahamas) Mark Knowles (3) (Canada) Daniel Nestor (2)	(Spain) Juan Balcells (Russia) Andrei Olhovskiy	6–3, 6–1
2002	(United States) Donald Johnson (United States) Jared Palmer (2)	(Czech Republic) Jiří Novák (Czech Republic) David Rikl	6–3, 7–6^{(7–5)}
2003	(Czech Republic) Martin Damm (Czech Republic) Cyril Suk	(The Bahamas) Mark Knowles (Canada) Daniel Nestor	6–4, 7–6^{(10–8)}
2004	(Czech Republic) Martin Damm (2) (Czech Republic) Cyril Suk (2)	(Austria) Stefan Koubek (United States) Andy Roddick	6–2, 6–4
2005	(Spain) Albert Costa (Spain) Rafael Nadal	(Romania) Andrei Pavel (Russia) Mikhail Youzhny	6–3, 4–6, 6–3
2006	(Sweden) Jonas Björkman (Belarus) Max Mirnyi (2)	(Belgium) Christophe Rochus (Belgium) Olivier Rochus	2–6, 6–3, [10–8]
2007	(Serbia) Nenad Zimonjić (Russia) Mikhail Youzhny	(Czech Republic) Martin Damm (India) Leander Paes	6–1, 7–6^{(7–3)}
2008	(Germany) Philipp Kohlschreiber (Czech Republic) David Škoch	(South Africa) Jeff Coetzee (South Africa) Wesley Moodie	6–4, 4–6, [11–9]
2009	(Spain) Marc López (Spain) Rafael Nadal (2)	(Canada) Daniel Nestor (Serbia) Nenad Zimonjić	4–6, 6–4, [10–8]
2010	(Spain) Guillermo García López (Spain) Albert Montañés	(Czech Republic) František Čermák (Slovakia) Michal Mertiňák	6–4, 7–5
2011	(Spain) Marc López (2) (Spain) Rafael Nadal (3)	(Italy) Daniele Bracciali (Italy) Andreas Seppi	6–3, 7–6^{(7–4)}
2012	(Slovakia) Filip Polášek (Czech Republic) Lukáš Rosol	(Germany) Christopher Kas (Germany) Philipp Kohlschreiber	6–3, 6–4
2013	(Germany) Christopher Kas (Germany) Philipp Kohlschreiber	(Austria) Julian Knowle (Slovakia) Filip Polášek	7–5, 6–4
2014	(Czech Republic) Tomáš Berdych (Czech Republic) Jan Hájek	(Austria) Alexander Peya (Brazil) Bruno Soares	6–2, 6–4
2015	(Argentina) Juan Mónaco (Spain) Rafael Nadal (4)	(Austria) Julian Knowle (Austria) Philipp Oswald	6–3, 6–4
2016	(Spain) Feliciano López (Spain) Marc López (3)	(Germany) Philipp Petzschner (Austria) Alexander Peya	6–4, 6–3
2017	(France) Jérémy Chardy (France) Fabrice Martin	(Canada) Vasek Pospisil (Czech Republic) Radek Štěpánek	6–4, 7–6^{(7–3)}
2018	(Austria) Oliver Marach (Croatia) Mate Pavić	(United Kingdom) Jamie Murray (Brazil) Bruno Soares	6–2, 7–6^{(8–6)}
2019	(Belgium) David Goffin (France) Pierre-Hugues Herbert	(Netherlands) Robin Haase (Netherlands) Matwé Middelkoop	5–7, 6–4, [10–4]
2020	(India) Rohan Bopanna (Netherlands) Wesley Koolhof	(United Kingdom) Luke Bambridge (Mexico) Santiago González	3–6, 6–2, [10–6]
2021	(Russia) Aslan Karatsev (Russia) Andrey Rublev	(New Zealand) Marcus Daniell (Austria) Philipp Oswald	7–5, 6–4
2022	(Netherlands) Wesley Koolhof (2) (United Kingdom) Neal Skupski	(India) Rohan Bopanna (Canada) Denis Shapovalov	7–6^{(7–4)}, 6–1
2023	(India) Rohan Bopanna (2) (Australia) Matthew Ebden	(France) Constant Lestienne (Netherlands) Botic van de Zandschulp	6–7^{(5–7)}, 6–4, [10–6]
2024	(United Kingdom) Jamie Murray (New Zealand) Michael Venus	(Italy) Lorenzo Musetti (Italy) Lorenzo Sonego	7–6^{(7–0)}, 2–6, [10–8]
↓ ATP Tour 500 ↓
2025	(United Kingdom) Julian Cash (United Kingdom) Lloyd Glasspool	(United Kingdom) Joe Salisbury (United Kingdom) Neal Skupski	6–3, 6–2
2026	(Finland) Harri Heliövaara (United Kingdom) Henry Patten	(United Kingdom) Julian Cash (United Kingdom) Lloyd Glasspool	6–3, 6–3

== Records ==
- Most singles titles: 3
  - (Switzerland) Roger Federer (2005, 2006, 2011)
- Most consecutive singles titles: 2
  - (Sweden) Stefan Edberg (1994–1995)
  - (Switzerland) Roger Federer (2005–2006)
  - (United Kingdom) Andy Murray (2008–2009)
  - (Serbia) Novak Djokovic (2016–2017)
- Most singles finals: 5
  - (United Kingdom) Andy Murray (2007, 2008, 2009, 2017, 2023)
- Most consecutive singles finals: 3
  - (United Kingdom) Andy Murray (2007–2009)
- Most doubles titles: 4
  - (Spain) Rafael Nadal (2005, 2009, 2011, 2015)
- Most consecutive doubles titles: 2
  - (The Bahamas) Mark Knowles (2000, 2001)
  - (Czech Republic) Martin Damm (2003, 2004)
  - (Czech Republic) Cyril Suk (2003, 2004)
- Most doubles finals: 4
  - (The Bahamas) Mark Knowles (1996, 2000, 2001, 2003)
  - (Canada) Daniel Nestor (1996, 2001, 2003, 2009)
  - (Spain) Rafael Nadal (2005, 2009, 2011, 2015)

== Season opener ==
The Qatar Open has been the site of the ceremonial opening of the ATP World Tour season since 2009. That year saw Rafael Nadal and Roger Federer (then-World No. 1 and 2, respectively) kick off the season on a tennis court situated on a boat off Doha Bay. The following year saw the duo return, this time playing on a "magic carpet" tennis court in the Souq Waqif. In 2011, the two came back and opened the new season on a court laid in the water of Doha Bay. The 2012 season was once again launched by both Federer and Nadal. This time, they played on a tennis court in the Katara Cultural Village amphitheatre.

== See also ==
- List of tennis tournaments
- ATP 250 tournaments
- WTA Qatar Open
