= Nikoloz Basilashvili =

Georgian tennis player (born 1992)

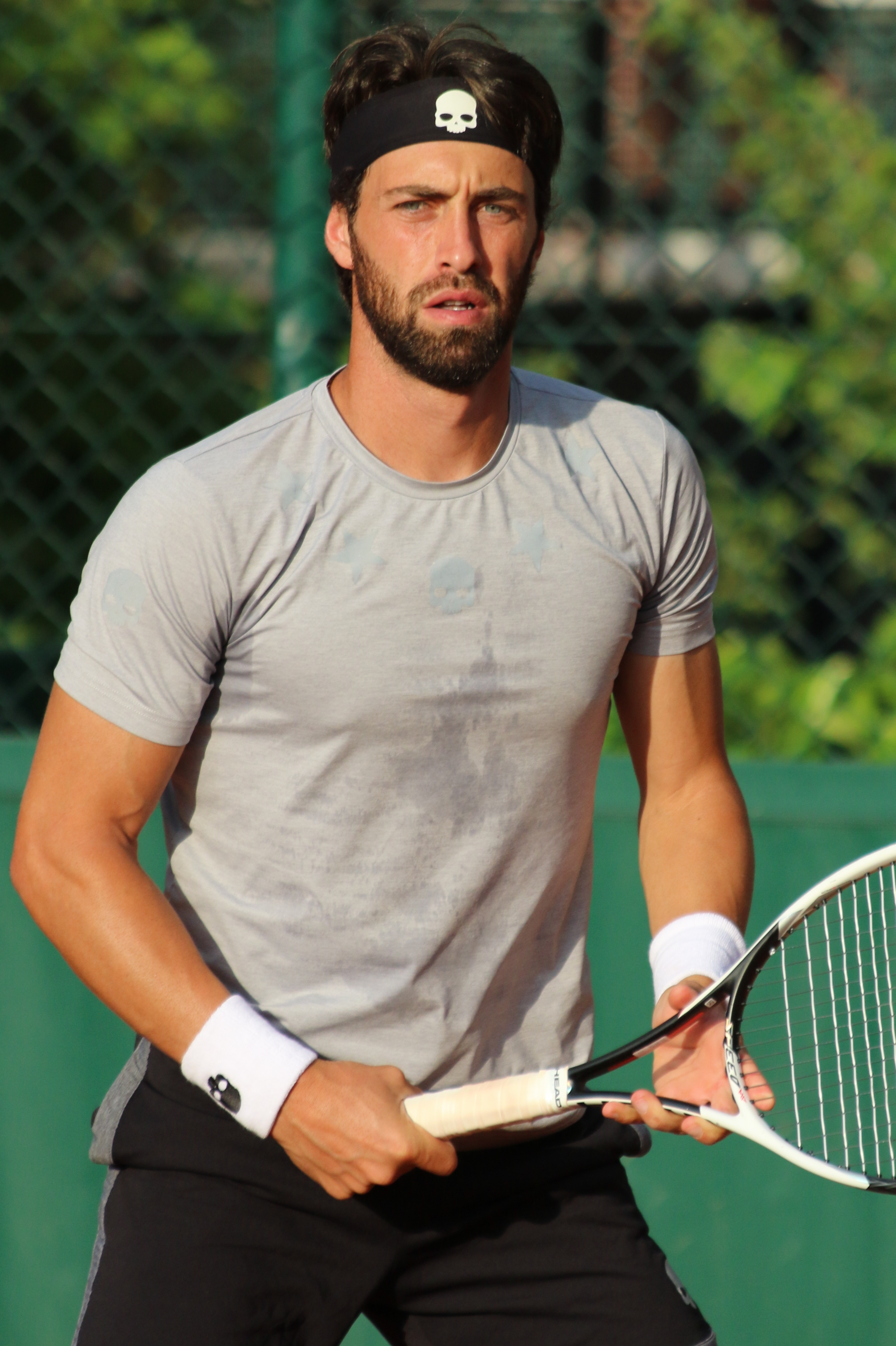
- Basilashvili in 2018
- Native name: ნიკოლოზ ბასილაშვილი
- Country (sports): Georgia
- Residence: Tbilisi, Georgia
- Born: 23 February 1992 (age 34) Tbilisi, Georgia
- Height: 1.85 m (6 ft 1 in)
- Turned pro: 2008
- Plays: Right-handed (two-handed backhand)
- Prize money: US $10,047,296

Singles
- Career record: 164–193
- Career titles: 5
- Highest ranking: No. 16 (27 May 2019)
- Current ranking: No. 85 (16 November 2026)

Grand Slam singles results
- Australian Open: 3R (2018, 2019)
- French Open: 3R (2017)
- Wimbledon: 3R (2015, 2022)
- US Open: 4R (2018)

Other tournaments
- Olympic Games: 3R (2021)

Doubles
- Career record: 14–53
- Career titles: 0
- Highest ranking: No. 148 (27 May 2019)

Grand Slam doubles results
- Australian Open: 1R (2018, 2021, 2022)
- French Open: 2R (2018)
- Wimbledon: 3R (2022)
- US Open: 1R (2017, 2022)

Team competitions
- Davis Cup: 10–7
- Last updated on: 15 November 2026.

Nikoloz Basilashvili (Georgian: ნიკოლოზ ბასილაშვილი, romanized: nik'oloz basilashvili, pronounced [nikʼoloz basilaʃʷili]; born 23 February 1992) is a Georgian professional tennis player. He has been ranked as high as world No. 16 in men's singles by the Association of Tennis Professionals (ATP), achieved in May 2019. Basilashvilli has won five ATP Tour singles titles. He is currently the No. 1 Georgian player. Basilashvilli is the highest-ranked Georgian player in history, and the first to win an ATP Tour title.

== Personal life ==
Basilashvili was born 23 February 1992 in Tbilisi, Georgia. His father, Nodar, is a dancer of the Sukhishvili Georgian National Ballet, his mother, Natalia, worked as a physician. He has a brother, Tengiz. Apart from his native language he also speaks Russian and English.

Basilashvili started playing tennis at age 5. From 2003 to 2012 he was coached in Sacramento, California, United States and at 18 he returned to Georgia, only to uproot again and move to an academy in Turkey run by an Australian coach, Gavin Hopper.

He has a son, Lukas who was born in 2015.

On 21 May 2020, Basilashvili was arrested on a charge of physically assaulting ex-wife Neka Dorokashvili in front of their son. Dorokashvili elaborated at a later point, alleging that Basilashvili "declared her as a subordinate" and treated her in a derogatory way. A Tbilisi court released Basilashvili on a bail of 100,000 Georgian Lari (around US$36,300), however, and since participated in the trial hearing remotely. His legal team denied the charges, stating that they were "false and completely unsubstantiated". Basilashvili was then cleared of charges after the court judge questioned why Dorokashvili did not come forward earlier and stated that her claims were either unsupported or had no substantial evidence behind them.

== Career ==
=== 2006–2008: Juniors ===
Nikoloz did not play at any Grand Slams during his junior career. He reached a career high combined (singles and doubles) of world No. 59 on 5 January 2009. He ended his junior career with a 35–22 record on singles and 14–17 on doubles.

Basilashvili played in his first ITF Junior Circuit tournament in late 2006 at the G2 Jerry Simmons Tournament. He lost in the first qualifying round. In 2007, he managed to break through the qualifying of two G4 tournaments in Israel and a G3 in Romania. Nikoloz lost in the Round of 16 in all of them. Later that year, he reached his first semifinal at any junior tournament doing that in doubles for the first time at the US Junior Hard Court Championships, partnering Patrick Daciek. In singles, he reached that round at the G4 USTA Illinois losing to Filip Krajinović, in September.

In 2008, Basilashvili won his only junior title, the G4 Tennis Express tournament, defeating Raymond Sarmiento in three sets. The Georgian played mostly at G1 and GA tournaments that year, breaking through the qualifiers of the Eddie Herr Tennis Championship and the Orange Bowl. He reached the round of 16 in the former and the quarterfinals in the latter. The Orange Bowl was his last junior tournament.

=== 2015: Major debut and first wins ===
In 2015, Basilashvili qualified for his first Grand Slam tournament – Roland Garros, losing in the first round to Thanasi Kokkinakis. He also managed to qualify for Wimbledon later that year, where he beat Facundo Bagnis and 15th seed Feliciano López, advancing to the third round of a major for the first time in his career. Additionally, he managed to qualify for the US Open, where he lost to Feliciano López in the first round in straight sets.

=== 2016: First ATP final ===
In 2016, Basilashvili qualified for his first Australian Open, losing the first round in straight sets to Roger Federer. Later that same year, in July, he reached his first ATP tournament final – the Austrian Open Kitzbühel, losing to Paolo Lorenzi in two sets. He recorded his first win over a Top 10 player in October when he defeated world number 10 Tomáš Berdych at the Vienna Open.

=== 2017: Second ATP final ===
In February 2017, Basilashvili participated at the Sofia event, grabbing victories over Adrian Mannarino, 1st seed Dominic Thiem and 8th seed Martin Kližan, before losing to 3rd seed and eventual champion Grigor Dimitrov in the semifinals. Basilashvili continued his good form at the Memphis Open, where he defeated 1st seed Ivo Karlović and went on to subsequently reach the final, losing to Ryan Harrison in straight sets. In June 2017, Basilashvili achieved a then career-high singles ranking of World No. 51. He reached three semifinals and one final throughout the year. At the 2017 French Open, after defeating Gilles Simon and Viktor Troicki, Basilashvili lost to eventual champion Rafael Nadal in the third round, winning just one game in three sets. Afterwards, the defeat was described as "embarrassing".

=== 2018: Historic best ranking and ATP title ===
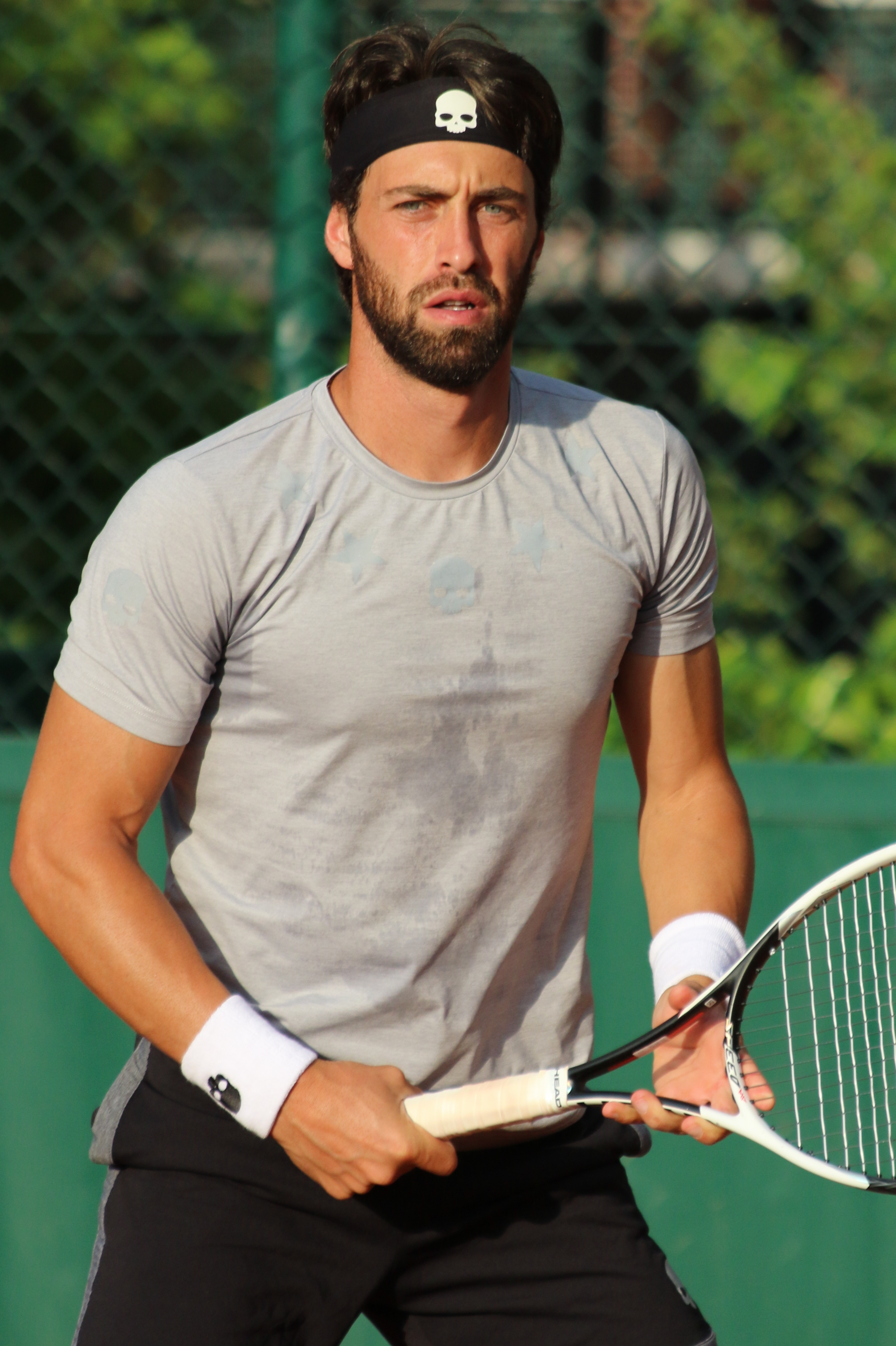
Basilashvili at the 2018 French Open

In July 2018, he made it into the main draw of the German Open in Hamburg as a qualifier and went on to win the tournament, defeating Leonardo Mayer 6–4, 0–6, 7–5 in the final and becoming the first Georgian player to win an ATP tournament. After winning his first title, Basilashvili moved to a new career-high World No. 35 in the world standings, the highest by a player from Georgia. In October 2018, he won his second ATP title by upsetting top seed Juan Martín del Potro in the final of the China Open. In December in Doha, he lost to Novak Djokovic in three sets after beating Albert Ramos Viñolas and Andrey Rublev.

=== 2019: Hamburg title defense and top 20 ===
In 2019, Basilashvili lost in four sets to the later semifinalist Stefanos Tsitsipas at the Australian Open after beating two qualifiers in four and five sets. At the ATP 500 tournament in Rotterdam in February, as the 9th seed, he beat Hyeon Chung before losing to Márton Fucsovics. His performance earned him his career-high ranking of World No. 19.

He then played the 2019 Dubai Tennis Championships where he beat Karen Khachanov and Roberto Bautista Agut before falling to Borna Ćorić of Croatia. At the 2019 Indian Wells Masters he suffered an upset to Prajnesh Gunneswaran of India. At the 2019 Miami Open he reached the fourth of a Masters 1000 for the first time in his career where he was defeated by qualifier Félix Auger-Aliassime.

On 27 May 2019, Basilashvilli reached his highest ever singles ranking of world No. 16 making him the highest ranked player from Georgia. In July, Basilashvili successfully defended his Hamburg title defeating Andrey Rublev in the final. En route to doing so, Basilashvili saved two match points against Alexander Zverev in the semifinals.

At the 2019 US Open he defeated Márton Fucsovics from Hungary in the first round and qualifier Jenson Brooksby in the second round before losing to another qualifier, the German Dominik Koepfer in the third.

=== 2020: Loss of form, tour COVID suspension ===
Basilashvili started his 2020 season by representing Georgia at the first edition of the ATP Cup. Georgia was in Group B alongside Spain, Japan, and Uruguay. Against Spain, he lost to Rafael Nadal. Spain won the tie over Georgia 3–0. Against Japan, he lost to Yoshihito Nishioka. Japan won the tie over Georgia 2-1. Against Uruguay, he beat Pablo Cuevas in three sets. Georgia won the tie over Uruguay 2–1. Georgia ended third in Group B. Seeded 26th at the Australian Open, he lost in the second round to 2009 semifinalist, Fernando Verdasco, in four sets.

At the Rotterdam Open, Basilashvili lost in the first round to seventh seed Andrey Rublev. In Dubai, he was defeated in the second round by Jan-Lennard Struff.

Representing Georgia in the Davis Cup tie against Estonia, he won his match over Vladimir Ivanov. Despite winning his match, Estonia still won the tie over Georgia 4–1. On March 12, the ATP announced that it would suspend tournament play due to the COVID-19 pandemic, which lasted through July.

=== 2021: Two titles, Masters finalist ===
Basilashvili started his 2021 season at the Antalya Open. Seeded sixth, he reached the quarterfinals where he lost to fourth seed, world No. 23, and eventual champion, Alex de Minaur. Seeded fifth at the Great Ocean Road Open, he was defeated in the second round by world No. 188 Mario Vilella Martínez. At the Australian Open, he was eliminated in the first round by American Tommy Paul.

In Montpellier, Basilashvili was beaten in the first round by French qualifier Grégoire Barrère. At the Rotterdam Open, he lost in the first round to qualifier Cameron Norrie. In Doha, he defeated John Millman and Malek Jaziri before stunning second seed and world no. 6, Roger Federer, in the quarterfinals. His semifinal win against Taylor Fritz in straight sets earned him his sixth ATP final against fifth seed Roberto Bautista Agut. He ended up beating Bautista Agut to win his fourth ATP singles title. At the Dubai Championships, he was defeated in the second round by 15th seed Taylor Fritz. Seeded 27th at the Miami Open, he was eliminated in the second round by Mikael Ymer.

Starting his clay-court season seeded fourth at the Sardegna Open, Basilashvili reached the semifinals where he fell to defending champion and eventual finalist, Laslo Đere. He retired during his first-round match against Filip Krajinović at the Monte-Carlo Masters due to injury. Competing in Barcelona, he was beaten in the first round by Jérémy Chardy. Seeded fifth at the BMW Open in Munich, he made it to the final beating Thiago Monteiro, qualifier Daniel Elahi Galán, lucky loser Norbert Gombos, and second seed Casper Ruud. He defeated 7th seed, Jan-Lennard Struff, in the championship match to lift his fifth ATP singles title. Playing in Madrid, he lost in round one to Benoît Paire. At the Italian Open, he was defeated in the first round by ninth seed Matteo Berrettini. Seeded third at the first edition of the Belgrade Open, he suffered a second round upset at the hands of qualifier Andrej Martin. Seeded 28th at the French Open, he was eliminated in the second round by qualifier Carlos Alcaraz.

Seeded fifth at the Stuttgart Open, his first grass-court tournament of the season, Basilashvili lost in the second round to eventual champion Marin Čilić. Getting past qualifying at the Halle Open, he reached the semifinals where he was defeated by fourth seed Andrey Rublev. Seeded 24th at Wimbledon, he was eliminated in the first round by two-time champion, Andy Murray, in four sets but won the third set after coming back from a 0–5 deficit to win the set 7–5.

Seeded third at the Hamburg Open, Basilashvili was beaten in the quarterfinals by Laslo Đere. Representing Georgia at the Summer Olympics, he lost in the third round to fourth seed and eventual gold medalist, Alexander Zverev.

Basilashvili began his preparation for the US Open at the National Bank Open in Toronto. He beat 12th seed, Alex de Minaur, in the second round. He was defeated in the third round by seventh seed Hubert Hurkacz. In Cincinnati, he was eliminated from the tournament in the first round by Fabio Fognini. At the US Open, he reached the third round where he was beaten by 22nd seed and American, Reilly Opelka.

Basilashvili achieved his best result at a Masters 1000 in Indian Wells by reaching the final, beating Christopher Eubanks, Albert Ramos Viñolas, 24th seed Karen Khachanov, world no. 3 and second seed Stefanos Tsitsipas, and 31st seed Taylor Fritz. He became the first Georgian to reach the semifinals of a Masters 1000 since Irakli Labadze at the 2004 Indian Wells Masters. He lost in the final to 21st seed, Cameron Norrie, in three sets. With the final, he became just the second Georgian to reach a Masters 1000 final after Alex Metreveli at the 1968 Monte-Carlo Masters and the first to represent Georgia as an independent country.

=== 2022: Doha finalist, Wimbledon third round ===
Basilashvili started his 2022 season by representing Georgia at the ATP Cup. Georgia was in Group D alongside Argentina, Poland, and Greece. Playing against Argentina, he lost to world No. 13 Diego Schwartzman. Against Greece, he retired during his match against world No. 4, Stefanos Tsitsipas, due to having breathing issues. In the end, Georgia ended fourth in Group D. Seeded second at the Sydney Classic, he was defeated in the second round by Andy Murray in three sets. Seeded 21st at the Australian Open, he lost in the first round to five-time finalist, Andy Murray, in five sets.

Seeded fourth at the Open Sud de France, Basilashvili was eliminated in the second round by qualifier Damir Džumhur. Seeded eighth in Rotterdam, he was beaten in the first round by Mackenzie McDonald. Seeded third and the defending champion at the Qatar ExxonMobil Open, he reached the final once again where he fell to second seed and world No. 16, Roberto Bautista Agut, in a rematch of the previous year's final. At the Dubai Championships, he was ousted from the tournament in the first round by lucky loser Alexei Popyrin. Seeded 18th and previous year finalist at the Indian Wells Masters, he lost in the third round to 12th seed and defending champion, Cameron Norrie, in a rematch of the previous year's final. Seeded 18th at the Miami Open, he was defeated in the second round by American Jenson Brooksby.

Basilashvili began his clay-court season at the Monte-Carlo Masters. Seeded 15th, he retired during his first-round match against Grigor Dimitrov due to breathing issues and chest pain. Seeded ninth at the Barcelona Open, he lost in the second round to Spanish wildcard Jaume Munar. Seeded fourth and the defending champion at the BMW Open in Munich, he fell in the quarterfinals to seventh seed Miomir Kecmanović. In Madrid, he was beaten in the second round by seventh seed, world No. 9, and eventual champion, Carlos Alcaraz. At the Italian Open, he lost in the second round to 13th seed and world No. 16, Denis Shapovalov. Seeded fifth at the Geneva Open, he was defeated in the second round by eventual finalist João Sousa. Seeded 22nd at the French Open, he lost in the second round to Mackenzie McDonald.

Basilashvili started his grass-court season at the BOSS Open in Stuttgart. Seeded fifth, he lost in the second round to Nick Kyrgios. In Halle, he stunned third seed, world No. 8, and last year finalist, Andrey Rublev, in the first round. He was defeated in the second round by Oscar Otte. Having been a late entry at the Mallorca Championships, he was defeated in the first round of qualifying by world No. 346 Mats Rosenkranz. Seeded 22nd at Wimbledon, he reached the third round where he lost to Dutch wildcard Tim van Rijthoven.

After Wimbledon, Basilashvili competed at the Swedish Open. Seeded sixth, he retired during his first-round match against Hugo Gaston. Seeded sixth at the Hamburg Open, he was beaten in the first round by Aslan Karatsev.

In August, Basilashvili played at the Western & Southern Open in Cincinnati. He lost in the first round to Mackenzie McDonald. This was his third loss of the season to McDonald. Seeded sixth at the Winston-Salem Open, he lost in his second-round match to Thiago Monteiro. Seeded 31st at the US Open, he was eliminated from the tournament in the first round by qualifier Wu Yibing.

Seeded fifth at the Moselle Open, Basilashvili lost in the second round to Arthur Rinderknech. Seeded sixth at the Sofia Open, he was defeated in the first round by Fernando Verdasco. In Vienna, he was beaten in the first round by top seed, world No. 4, and eventual champion, Daniil Medvedev. At the Paris Masters, he lost in the second round to Lorenzo Musetti. Basilashvili played in his final tournament of the season at the Open International de Tennis de Roanne, an ATP Challenger. Seeded fifth, he reached the quarterfinals where he lost to second seed and eventual champion, Hugo Gaston, in three sets.

He finished the year at No. 92 in the singles rankings.

=== 2023–2025: Hiatus, back to Majors and Masters ===
Basilashvili started his 2023 season at the Maharashtra Open. He lost in the first round to Marco Cecchinato. At the Adelaide International 2, he retired during his first round of qualifying match against Mikael Ymer. At the Australian Open, he lost in the first round to eighth seed and world No. 9, Taylor Fritz, in four sets.

At the 2023 Open Sud de France, Basilashvili was defeated in the second round by Grégoire Barrère. In Rotterdam, he lost in the final round of qualifying to Constant Lestienne. At the Qatar ExxonMobil Open, he fell in the final round of qualifying to Liam Broady. However, he entered the main draw as a lucky loser. Despite being the 2021 champion and the finalist the previous year, he lost in the first round to French qualifier Alexandre Müller. Due to not defending his runner-up points, his ranking fell from No. 84 to No. 113 out of the top 100 on 20 February 2023. In the next three months, he further fell another 100 positions out of the top 200 following the 2023 Italian Open where he retired in the first round of qualifying, due to injury issues. On 15 October 2023, after close to a six months hiatus, he came back to the ATP Challenger Tour at the 2023 Hamburg Ladies & Gents Cup, where he lost in the first round.

In March 2024, ranked No. 1086, at the 2024 Murcia Open, he reached his seventh Challenger final as a qualifier and moved 500 positions up in the rankings in the top 550 on 1 April 2024. He won his sixth Challenger title in Seoul defeating top seed Taro Daniel and returned to the top 250 at world No. 215 on 4 November 2024.

In January 2025, Basilashvili qualified for the 2025 Australian Open after missing the 2024 edition. In March 2025, he qualified for the first Sunshine Double tournament, the 2025 Indian Wells, where he was a former finalist, returning to the Masters 1000 level after a two years' absence. In May, Basilashvili reached his first final of the season at the 2025 BNP Paribas Primrose Bordeaux defeating Tallon Griekspoor. Next, Basilashvili qualified for the 2025 French Open and for the 2025 Wimbledon Championships, where he defeated former semifinalist and world No. 7 Lorenzo Musetti, after a two-year absence in the main draw at both Grand Slams.

=== 2026: Masters fourth round, Top 10 win, ATP final, back to Top 100 ===
At the 2026 Italian Open where he qualified for the main draw, Basilashvili reached the third round of a Masters 1000 since 2022 Indian Wells, with a win over fifth seed Ben Shelton. Next he reached the fourth round of a Masters for the first time since he was a finalist in 2021 Indian Wells, defeating 30th seed Brandon Nakashima.

At the 2026 Almaty Open Basilashvili reached his first ATP Tour final since the 2022 Qatar ExxonMobil Open. As a result he returned to the top 100 on 26 October 2026, for the first time since November 2025, to No. 95 in the singles rankings.

== Performance timelines ==
Key
| W | F | SF | QF | #R | RR | Q# | P# | DNQ | A | Z# | PO | G | S | B | NMS | NTI | P | NH |

(W) winner; (F) finalist; (SF) semifinalist; (QF) quarterfinalist; (#R) rounds 4, 3, 2, 1; (RR) round-robin stage; (Q#) qualification round; (P#) preliminary round; (DNQ) did not qualify; (A) absent; (Z#) Davis/Fed Cup Zonal Group (with number indication) or (PO) play-off; (G) gold, (S) silver or (B) bronze Olympic/Paralympic medal; (NMS) not a Masters tournament; (NTI) not a Tier I tournament; (P) postponed; (NH) not held; (SR) strike rate (events won / competed); (W–L) win–loss record.
To avoid confusion and double counting, these charts are updated at the conclusion of a tournament or when the player's participation has ended.

=== Singles ===
Current through the 2026 Erste Bank Open.

| Tournament | 2014 | 2015 | 2016 | 2017 | 2018 | 2019 | 2020 | 2021 | 2022 | 2023 | 2024 | 2025 | 2026 | SR | W–L | Win% |
|---|---|---|---|---|---|---|---|---|---|---|---|---|---|---|---|---|
Grand Slam tournaments
| Australian Open | A | Q1 | 1R | 1R | 3R | 3R | 2R | 1R | 1R | 1R | A | 1R | Q1 | 0 / 9 | 5–9 | 36% |
| French Open | A | 1R | 1R | 3R | 1R | 1R | 1R | 2R | 2R | Q1 | A | 1R | Q1 | 0 / 9 | 4–9 | 31% |
| Wimbledon | Q1 | 3R | Q2 | 2R | 1R | 2R | NH | 1R | 3R | A | A | 2R | Q1 | 0 / 7 | 7–7 | 50% |
| US Open | Q2 | 1R | Q1 | 1R | 4R | 3R | 1R | 3R | 1R | A | A | Q2 | Q1 | 0 / 7 | 7–7 | 50% |
| Win–loss | 0–0 | 2–3 | 0–2 | 3–4 | 5–4 | 5–4 | 1–3 | 3–4 | 3–4 | 0–1 | 0–0 | 1–3 | 0–0 | 0 / 32 | 23–32 | 42% |
National representation
| Summer Olympics | Not Held | | 1R | Not Held | | | | 3R | NH | | A | NH | | 0 / 2 | 2–2 | 50% |
ATP 1000 tournaments
| Indian Wells Open | A | Q2 | A | 1R | 1R | 2R | NH | F | 3R | 1R | A | 1R | Q2 | 0 / 7 | 5–7 | 42% |
| Miami Open | A | A | A | 1R | 2R | 4R | NH | 2R | 2R | Q1 | A | Q1 | 1R | 0 / 6 | 3–6 | 33% |
| Monte-Carlo Masters | A | A | A | 1R | A | 1R | NH | 1R | 1R | A | A | A | Q2 | 0 / 4 | 0–4 | 0% |
| Madrid Open | A | A | A | Q1 | 1R | 1R | NH | 1R | 2R | A | A | A | 1R | 0 / 5 | 1–5 | 17% |
| Italian Open | A | A | A | A | 2R | 3R | 1R | 1R | 2R | Q1 | A | A | 4R | 0 / 6 | 7–6 | 54% |
| Canada Masters | A | A | A | 1R | A | 3R | NH | 3R | A | A | A | A | A | 0 / 3 | 4–3 | 57% |
| Cincinnati Open | A | Q1 | 1R | 3R | A | 1R | 1R | 1R | 1R | A | A | Q2 | Q1 | 0 / 6 | 2–6 | 25% |
| Shanghai Masters | A | 1R | Q1 | 1R | 2R | 3R | Not Held | | | A | A | 1R | 1R | 0 / 6 | 3–6 | 33% |
| Paris Masters | A | A | Q2 | Q1 | 2R | 1R | 1R | 1R | 2R | A | A | A | A | 0 / 5 | 2–5 | 29% |
| Win–loss | 0–0 | 0–1 | 0–1 | 2–6 | 4–6 | 8–9 | 0–3 | 7–8 | 3–7 | 0–1 | 0–0 | 0–2 | 3–4 | 0 / 48 | 27–48 | 36% |
Career statistics
| Tournaments | 1 | 8 | 9 | 27 | 28 | 25 | 11 | 29 | 27 | 5 | 0 | 10 | 12 | Career total: 192 | | |
| Titles–Finals | 0–0 | 0–0 | 0–1 | 0–1 | 2–2 | 1–1 | 0–0 | 2–3 | 0–1 | 0–0 | 0–0 | 0–0 | 0–1 | Career total: 5–10 | | |
| Overall win–loss | 0–1 | 4–8 | 8–10 | 25–27 | 29–28 | 28–24 | 4–13 | 33–27 | 14–29 | 1–5 | 0–0 | 7–10 | 12–12 | 5 / 192 | 165–194 | 46% |
| Year-end ranking | 178 | 113 | 94 | 59 | 21 | 26 | 40 | 22 | 91 | 596 | 208 | 109 | 85 | $10,782,102 | | |

== ATP Masters 1000 finals ==
=== Singles: 1 (runner-up) ===
| Result | Year | Tournament | Surface | Opponent | Score |
|---|---|---|---|---|---|
| Loss | 2021 | Indian Wells Open | Hard | (United Kingdom) Cameron Norrie | 6–3, 4–6, 1–6 |

== ATP Tour finals ==
=== Singles: 10 (5 titles, 5 runner-ups) ===
| Legend Grand Slam (–) ATP 1000 (0–1) ATP 500 (3–0) ATP 250 (2–4) | Finals by surface Hard (2–4) Clay (3–1) Grass (–) | Finals by setting Outdoor (5–3) Indoor (0–2) |

| Result | W–L | Date | Tournament | Tier | Surface | Opponent | Score |
|---|---|---|---|---|---|---|---|
| Loss | 0–1 | Jul 2016 | Austrian Open Kitzbühel, Austria | ATP 250 | Clay | (Italy) Paolo Lorenzi | 3–6, 4–6 |
| Loss | 0–2 | Feb 2017 | Memphis Open, United States | ATP 250 | Hard (i) | (United States) Ryan Harrison | 1–6, 4–6 |
| Win | 1–2 | Jul 2018 | German Open, Germany | ATP 500 | Clay | (Argentina) Leonardo Mayer | 6–4, 0–6, 7–5 |
| Win | 2–2 | Oct 2018 | China Open, China | ATP 500 | Hard | (Argentina) Juan Martín del Potro | 6–4, 6–4 |
| Win | 3–2 | Jul 2019 | Hamburg European Open, Germany (2) | ATP 500 | Clay | (Russia) Andrey Rublev | 7–5, 4–6, 6–3 |
| Win | 4–2 | Mar 2021 | Qatar Open, Qatar | ATP 250 | Hard | (Spain) Roberto Bautista Agut | 7–6^{(7–5)}, 6–2 |
| Win | 5–2 | May 2021 | Bavarian Championships, Germany | ATP 250 | Clay | (Germany) Jan-Lennard Struff | 6–4, 7–6^{(7–5)} |
| Loss | 5–3 | Oct 2021 | Indian Wells Open, United States | ATP 1000 | Hard | (United Kingdom) Cameron Norrie | 6–3, 4–6, 1–6 |
| Loss | 5–4 | Feb 2022 | Qatar Open, Qatar | ATP 250 | Hard | (Spain) Roberto Bautista Agut | 3–6, 4–6 |
| Loss | 5–5 | Oct 2026 | Almaty Open, Kazakhstan | ATP 250 | Hard (i) | Daniil Medvedev | 7–6^{(8–6)}, 1–6, 3–6 |

== ATP Challenger and ITF Tour finals ==
=== Singles: 23 (16 titles, 7 runner–ups) ===
| Legend ATP Challenger Tour (6–3) ITF Futures (10–4) | Finals by surface Hard (8–1) Clay (7–5) Carpet (1–1) |

| Result | W–L | Date | Tournament | Tier | Surface | Opponent | Score |
|---|---|---|---|---|---|---|---|
| Win | 1–0 | May 2014 | Karshi Challenger, Uzbekistan | Challenger | Hard | (United States) Chase Buchanan | 7–6^{(7–2)}, 6–2 |
| Loss | 1–1 | Nov 2014 | Castel International, Italy | Challenger | Carpet (i) | (Lithuania) Ričardas Berankis | 4–6, 0–1 ret. |
| Win | 2–1 | Mar 2015 | Israel Open, Israel | Challenger | Hard | (Slovakia) Lukáš Lacko | 4–6, 6–4, 6–3 |
| Win | 3–1 | Jul 2015 | Sport 1 Open, Netherlands | Challenger | Clay | (Russia) Andrey Kuznetsov | 6–7^{(3–7)}, 7–6^{(7–4)}, 6–3 |
| Win | 4–1 | Mar 2016 | Guangzhou Challenger, China | Challenger | Hard | (Slovakia) Lukáš Lacko | 6–1, 6–7^{(6–8)}, 7–5 |
| Win | 5–1 | May 2016 | Heilbronner Neckarcup, Germany | Challenger | Clay | (Germany) Jan-Lennard Struff | 6–4, 7–6^{(7–3)} |
| Loss | 5–2 | Mar 2024 | Murcia Open, Spain | Challenger | Clay | (Portugal) Henrique Rocha | 6–3, 6–7^{(0–7)}, 5–7 |
| Win | 6–2 | Nov 2024 | Seoul Open Challenger, Korea | Challenger | Hard | (Japan) Taro Daniel | 7–5, 6–4 |
| Loss | 6–3 | May 2025 | Bordeaux Challenger, France | Challenger 175 | Clay | (France) Giovanni Mpetshi Perricard | 3–6, 7–6^{(7–5)}, 5–7 |
| Win | 1–0 | Aug 2009 | F6 Sochi, Russia | Futures | Clay | (Russia) Mikhail Fufygin | 2–6, 7–5, 7–5 |
| Win | 2–0 | Jun 2012 | F8 Kazan, Russia | Futures | Clay | (Ukraine) Ivan Sergeyev | 6–4, 7–6^{(7–4)} |
| Loss | 2–1 | Jul 2012 | F1 Yerevan, Armenia | Futures | Clay | (Belgium) Arthur De Greef | 0–6, 1–6 |
| Loss | 2–2 | Aug 2012 | F11 Moscow, Russia | Futures | Clay | (Netherlands) Boy Westerhof | 4–6, 4–6 |
| Win | 3–2 | Aug 2012 | F12 Moscow, Russia | Futures | Clay | (Russia) Aleksandr Lobkov | 6–3, 7–6^{(7–0)} |
| Win | 4–2 | Sep 2012 | F2 Tbilisi, Georgia | Futures | Clay | (Croatia) Toni Androić | 6–3, 4–6, 7–6^{(7–1)} |
| Win | 5–2 | Dec 2012 | F47 Antalya, Turkey | Futures | Hard | (Ukraine) Volodymyr Uzhylovskyi | 3–6, 6–2, 6–2 |
| Win | 6–2 | Dec 2012 | F48 Antalya, Turkey | Futures | Hard | (Spain) Guillermo Olaso | 6–2, 6–2 |
| Win | 7–2 | Aug 2013 | F21 Appiano, Italy | Futures | Clay | (Italy) Matteo Trevisan | 7–5, 3–6, 6–4 |
| Loss | 7–3 | Nov 2013 | F44 Antalya, Turkey | Futures | Hard | (Germany) Robin Kern | 6–4, 3–6, 3–6 |
| Loss | 7–4 | Nov 2013 | F45 Antalya, Turkey | Futures | Clay | (Austria) Marc Rath | 1–6, 3–6 |
| Win | 8–4 | Jan 2014 | F3 Kaarst, Germany | Futures | Carpet (i) | (Slovakia) Miloslav Mečíř | 2–6, 7–5, 6–3 |
| Win | 9–4 | Dec 2014 | F5 Doha, Qatar | Futures | Hard | (India) Ramkumar Ramanathan | 7–6^{(7–5)}, 6–2 |
| Win | 10–4 | Dec 2014 | F6 Doha, Qatar | Futures | Hard | (United Kingdom) James Marsalek | 6–1, 6–2 |

=== Doubles: 6 (2 titles, 4 runner–ups) ===
| Legend ATP Challenger Tour (0–1) ITF Futures (2–3) | Finals by surface Hard (1–2) Clay (0–2) Carpet (1–0) |

| Result | W–L | Date | Tournament | Tier | Surface | Partner | Opponent | Score |
|---|---|---|---|---|---|---|---|---|
| Loss | 1–0 | Apr 2015 | Napoli Cup, Italy | Challenger | Clay | (Belarus) Aliaksandr Bury | (Serbia) Ilija Bozoljac (Serbia) Filip Krajinović | 1–6, 2–6 |
| Win | 1–0 | Mar 2010 | ITF McAllen, US | Futures | Hard | (Chinese Taipei) Chen Ti | (Australia) Jared Easton (Australia) Matheson Klein | 7–5, 4–6, [10–4] |
| Loss | 1–1 | Feb 2011 | ITF Brownsville, US | Futures | Hard | (Bulgaria) Boris Nicola Bakalov | (United States) Devin Britton (United States) Greg Ouellette | 1–6, 3–6 |
| Loss | 1–2 | Nov 2013 | ITF Antalya, Turkey | Futures | Clay | (Serbia) Miljan Zekić | (Germany) Tom Schonenberg (Germany) Matthias Wunner | 0–6, 4–6 |
| Loss | 1–3 | Dec 2013 | ITF Doha, Qatar | Futures | Hard | (Belarus) Yahor Yatsyk | (United Kingdom) Evan Hoyt (Tunisia) Skander Mansouri | 4–6, 6–7^{(2–7)} |
| Win | 2–3 | Jan 2014 | ITF Kaarst, Germany | Futures | Carpet (i) | (Belarus) Aliaksandr Bury | (Belarus) Uladzimir Ignatik (Bulgaria) Dimitar Kutrovsky | 4–6, 6–4, [10–6] |

== Wins over top 10 players ==
- Basilashvili has a 9–24 record against players who were, at the time the match was played, ranked in the top 10.

| Season | 2016 | 2017 | 2018 | 2019 | 2020 | 2021 | 2022 | 2023 | 2024 | 2025 | 2026 | Total |
|---|---|---|---|---|---|---|---|---|---|---|---|---|
| Wins | 1 | 1 | 1 | 1 | 0 | 2 | 1 | 0 | 0 | 1 | 1 | 9 |

| # | Player | Rank | Event | Surface | Rd | Score | NB Rank |
|---|---|---|---|---|---|---|---|
2016
| 1. | (Czech Republic) Tomáš Berdych | 10 | Vienna Open, Austria | Hard (i) | 1R | 6–4, 6–7^{(5–7)}, 7–5 | 107 |
2017
| 2. | (Austria) Dominic Thiem | 8 | Sofia Open, Bulgaria | Hard (i) | 2R | 6–4, 6–4 | 87 |
2018
| 3. | (Argentina) Juan Martín del Potro | 4 | China Open, China | Hard | F | 6–4, 6–4 | 34 |
2019
| 4. | (Germany) Alexander Zverev | 5 | German Open, Germany | Clay | SF | 6–4, 4–6, 7–6^{(7–5)} | 16 |
2021
| 5. | (Switzerland) Roger Federer | 6 | Qatar Open, Qatar | Hard | QF | 3–6, 6–1, 7–5 | 42 |
| 6. | (Greece) Stefanos Tsitsipas | 3 | Indian Wells Open, United States | Hard | QF | 6–4, 2–6, 6–4 | 36 |
2022
| 7. | Andrey Rublev | 8 | Halle Open, Germany | Grass | 1R | 7–6^{(7–1)}, 6–4 | 25 |
2025
| 8. | (Italy) Lorenzo Musetti | 7 | Wimbledon, United Kingdom | Grass | 1R | 6–2, 4–6, 7–5, 6–1 | 126 |
2026
| 9. | (United States) Ben Shelton | 6 | Italian Open, Italy | Clay | 2R | 6–4, 6–7^{(5–7)}, 6–3 | 117 |

* As of 9 May 2026

== Davis Cup matches ==
2015 Davis Cup Europe Group III
| Round | Date | Opponents | Final match score | Location | Surface | Match | Opponent | Rubber Score |
| RR | July 15, 2015 | Albania | 3–0 | San Marino | Clay | Singles 2 | Rel Pelushi | 6–0, 6–0 (W) |
| RR | July 17, 2015 | Malta | 3–0 | San Marino | Clay | Singles 2 | Bernard Cassar Torregiani | 6–1, 6–0 (W) |
| Play-off | July 18, 2015 | Estonia | 2–0 | San Marino | Clay | Singles 2 | Jürgen Zopp | 3–6, 6–2, 6–4 (W) |
2016 Davis Cup Europe/Africa Zone Group II
| Round | Date | Opponents | Final match score | Location | Surface | Match | Opponent | Rubber Score |
| 1R | March 4–6, 2016 | Denmark | 0–5 | Tbilisi | Carpet (indoor) | Singles 1 | Christian Sigsgaard | 7–6^{(7–4)}, 1–6, 4–6, 4–6 (L) |
| 1R | March 4–6, 2016 | Denmark | 0–5 | Tbilisi | Carpet (indoor) | Doubles (with George Tsivadze) | Sigsgaard/Nielsen | 6–7^{(3–7)}, 1–6, 2–6 (L) |
| Play-off | July 15–17, 2016 | Zimbabwe | 3–2 | Tbilisi | Hard | Singles 2 | Mark Fynn | 6–3, 6–3, 6–2 (W) |
| Play-off | July 15–17, 2016 | Zimbabwe | 3–2 | Tbilisi | Hard | Doubles (with Nodar Itonishvili) | Lock/John Lock | 6–3, 6–3, 6–7^{(6–8)}, 4–6, 4–6 (L) |
| Play-off | July 15–17, 2016 | Zimbabwe | 3–2 | Tbilisi | Hard | Singles 3 | Benjamin Lock | 6–3, 6–4, 6–2 (W) |
2017 Davis Cup Europe/Africa Zone Group II
| Round | Date | Opponents | Final match score | Location | Surface | Match | Opponent | Rubber Score |
| 1R | February 3–5, 2017 | Finland | 3–2 | Tbilisi | Carpet (indoor) | Singles 1 | Eero Vasa | 2–6, 6–1, 6–4, 6–1 (W) |
| 1R | February 3–5, 2017 | Finland | 3–2 | Tbilisi | Carpet (indoor) | Doubles (with George Tsivadze) | Heliövaara/Niklas-Salminen | 4–6, 0–6, 3–6 (L) |
| 1R | February 3–5, 2017 | Finland | 3–2 | Tbilisi | Carpet (indoor) | Singles 3 | Emil Ruusuvuori | 6–2, 6–4, 6–4 (W) |
| 2R | April 7–9, 2017 | Lithuania | 2–3 | Tbilisi | Hard | Singles 1 | Tadas Babelis | 6–3, 6–2, 6–0 (W) |
| 2R | April 7–9, 2017 | Lithuania | 2–3 | Tbilisi | Hard | Doubles (with George Tsivadze) | Grigelis/Mugevičius | 4–6, 3–6, 3–6 (L) |
| 2R | April 7–9, 2017 | Lithuania | 2–3 | Tbilisi | Hard | Singles 3 | Laurynas Grigelis | 6–0, 6–1, 6–0 (W) |
2018 Davis Cup Europe/Africa Zone Group II
| Round | Date | Opponents | Final match score | Location | Surface | Match | Opponent | Rubber Score |
| 1R | February 3–4, 2017 | Morocco | 1–3 | Marrakesh | Clay | Singles 2 | Amine Ahouda | 6–3, 3–6, 3–6 (L) |
| 1R | February 3–4, 2017 | Morocco | 1–3 | Marrakesh | Clay | Doubles (with Aleksandre Metreveli) | Ahouda/Ouahab | 7–6^{(7–4)}, 4–6, 6–2 (W) |
| 1R | February 3–4, 2017 | Morocco | 1–3 | Marrakesh | Clay | Singles 3 | Lamine Ouahab | 1–6, 3–6 (L) |
