= 1998 Qatar Open =

- Date: 5 – 12 January 1998
- Edition: 6th
- Category: ATP World Series
- Draw: 32S / 16D
- Prize money: $975,000
- Surface: Hard / outdoor
- Location: Doha, Qatar

Champions

Singles
- (Czech Republic) Petr Korda

Doubles
- (India) Mahesh Bhupathi / (India) Leander Paes
← 1997 ·	ATP Qatar Open	· 1999 →

The 1998 Qatar Open, known as the 1998 Qatar Mobil Open, for sponsorship reasons, was a men's tennis tournament played on outdoor hard courts in Doha, Qatar that was part of the World Series of the 1998 ATP Tour. The tournament was held from 5 January through 12 January 1998. Third-seeded Petr Korda won the singles title.

== Finals ==
=== Singles ===
(Czech Republic) Petr Korda defeated (France) Fabrice Santoro, 6–0, 6–3.

- It was Korda's 1st title of the year and the 19th of his career.

=== Doubles ===
(India) Mahesh Bhupathi / (India) Leander Paes defeated (France) Olivier Delaître / (France) Fabrice Santoro, 6–4, 3–6, 6–4.

- It was Bhupathi's 1st title of the year and the 7th of his career. It was Paes's 1st title of the year and the 7th of his career.
