= 1997 U.S. Women's Hard Court Championships – Doubles =

Doubles
- 1997 U.S. Women's Hard Court Championships

Final
- Champions: (United States) Nicole Arendt (Netherlands) Manon Bollegraf
- Runners-up: (France) Alexandra Fusai (France) Nathalie Tauziat
- Score: 6–7, 6–3, 6–2

Details
- Draw: 16
- Seeds: 4

Events
Singles	Doubles
← 1994 ·	U.S. Women's Hard Court Championships	· 1998 →

Nicole Arendt and Manon Bollegraf won in the final 6–7, 6–3, 6–2 against Alexandra Fusai and Nathalie Tauziat.

== Seeds ==
Champion seeds are indicated in bold text while text in italics indicates the round in which those seeds were eliminated.

1. (United States) **Nicole Arendt** / (Netherlands) **Manon Bollegraf (champions)**
2. (Argentina) Patricia Tarabini / (Netherlands) Caroline Vis (quarterfinals)
3. (France) Alexandra Fusai / (France) Nathalie Tauziat (final)
4. (Japan) Naoko Kijimuta / (Japan) Nana Miyagi (quarterfinals)

== Draw ==
=== Key ===
- Q = Qualifier
- WC = Wild card
- LL = Lucky loser
- Alt = Alternate
- ITF = ITF entry
- PR = Protected ranking
- SR = Special ranking
- SE = Special exempt
- JE = Junior exempt
- JR = Junior Accelerator Programme entrant
- CO = College Accelerator Programme entrant
- NG = Next Gen Accelerator Program entrant
- w/o = Walkover
- r = Retired
- d = Defaulted

First round
1	(United States) **N Arendt** (Netherlands) **M Bollegraf**	**w/o**
(Italy) S Farina (Austria) B Schett
(Slovakia) K Habšudová (Switzerland) P Schnyder	5	4
Q	(Germany) **B Rittner** (Belgium) **D Van Roost**	**7**	**6**
4	(Japan) **N Kijimuta** (Japan) **N Miyagi**	**6**	6	**6**
(France) A Dechaume-Balleret (Japan) A Sugiyama	2	**7**	2
(Romania) R Dragomir (Croatia) I Majoli	**6**	2	4
(Argentina) **I Gorrochategui** (Czech Republic) **H Suková**	4	**6**	**6**
(United States) **C Rubin** (Netherlands) **B Schultz-McCarthy**	**6**	**6**
(Italy) R Grande (United States) L Wild	4	4
LL	(Australia) C Barclay (United Kingdom) C Wood	2	3
3	(France) **A Fusai** (France) **N Tauziat**	**6**	**6**
(Argentina) **F Labat** (Russia) **E Likhovtseva**	**6**	5	**6**
WC	(United States) R Jensen (Australia) D Jones	3	**7**	4
(Netherlands) K Boogert (Czech Republic) J Novotná	3	3
2	(Argentina) **P Tarabini** (Netherlands) **C Vis**	**6**	**6**

Quarterfinals
1	(United States) **N Arendt** (Netherlands) **M Bollegraf**	**6**	**7**
Q	(Germany) B Rittner (Belgium) D Van Roost	3	5
4	(Japan) N Kijimuta (Japan) N Miyagi	3	4
(Argentina) **I Gorrochategui** (Czech Republic) **H Suková**	**6**	**6**
(United States) C Rubin (Netherlands) B Schultz-McCarthy
3	(France) **A Fusai** (France) **N Tauziat**	**w/o**
(Argentina) **F Labat** (Russia) **E Likhovtseva**	**6**	**6**
2	(Argentina) P Tarabini (Netherlands) C Vis	2	3

Semifinals
1	(United States) **N Arendt** (Netherlands) **M Bollegraf**	**6**	**6**
(Argentina) I Gorrochategui (Czech Republic) H Suková	2	4
3	(France) **A Fusai** (France) **N Tauziat**	**6**	**6**
(Argentina) F Labat (Russia) E Likhovtseva	3	3

Final
1	(United States) **Nicole Arendt** (Netherlands) **Manon Bollegraf**	6	**6**	**6**
3	(France) Alexandra Fusai (France) Nathalie Tauziat	**7**	3	2
