= 1997 U.S. Women's Hard Court Championships =

- Date: August 18–24
- Edition: 30th
- Category: Tier II
- Draw: 28S / 16D
- Prize money: $450,000
- Surface: Hard / outdoor
- Location: Atlanta, Georgia, U.S.
- Venue: Stone Mountain Tennis Center

Champions

Singles
- (United States) Lindsay Davenport

Doubles
- (United States) Nicole Arendt / (Netherlands) Manon Bollegraf
← 1994 ·	U.S. Women's Hard Court Championships	· 1998 →

The 1997 U.S. Women's Hard Court Championships was a women's tennis tournament played on outdoor hard courts at the Stone Mountain Tennis Center in Atlanta, Georgia in the United States that was part of Tier II of the 1997 WTA Tour. It was the 30th edition of the tournament and was held from August 18 through August 24, 1997. Lindsay Davenport won the singles title.

== Finals ==
=== Singles ===
(United States) Lindsay Davenport defeated (France) Sandrine Testud 6–4, 6–1

- It was Davenport's 4th singles title of the year and the 11th of her career.

=== Doubles ===
(United States) Nicole Arendt / (Netherlands) Manon Bollegraf defeated (France) Alexandra Fusai / (France) Nathalie Tauziat 6–7, 6–3, 6–2

- It was Arendt's 4th and last doubles title of the year and the 13th of her career. It was Bollegraf's 4th and last doubles title of the year and the 26th and last of her career.
