= 1998 Pilot Pen International – Men's doubles =

Men's doubles
- 1998 Pilot Pen International

Final
- Champions: (Australia) Wayne Arthurs (Australia) Peter Tramacchi
- Runners-up: (Canada) Sébastien Lareau (United States) Alex O'Brien
- Score: 7–6, 1–6, 6–3

Details
- Draw: 28
- Seeds: 8

Events
Singles	men	women
Doubles	men	women
← 1997 ·	Pilot Pen International

The 1998 Pilot Pen International was a tennis tournament played on outdoor hard courts at the Cullman-Heyman Tennis Center in New Haven, Connecticut, in the United States that was part of the International Series Gold of the 1998 ATP Tour and of Tier II of the 1998 WTA Tour. The men's tournament was held from August 17 through August 23, 1998, while the women's tournament was held from August 24 through August 30, 1998.

== Seeds ==
Champion seeds are indicated in bold text while text in italics indicates the round in which those seeds were eliminated.

1. (India) Mahesh Bhupathi / (India) Leander Paes (second round)
2. (Australia) Todd Woodbridge / (Australia) Mark Woodforde (semifinals)
3. (Russia) Yevgeny Kafelnikov / (Czech Republic) Daniel Vacek (semifinals)
4. (Canada) Sébastien Lareau / (United States) Alex O'Brien (finale)
5. (Germany) Marc-Kevin Goellner / (Germany) David Prinosil (quarterfinals)
6. (United States) Justin Gimelstob / (United States) Jonathan Stark (first round)
7. (Spain) Julián Alonso / (Spain) Javier Sánchez (first round)
8. (Argentina) Pablo Albano / (Ecuador) Nicolás Lapentti (quarterfinals)

== Draw ==
=== Key ===
- Q = Qualifier
- WC = Wild card
- LL = Lucky loser
- Alt = Alternate
- ITF = ITF entry
- PR = Protected ranking
- SR = Special ranking
- SE = Special exempt
- JE = Junior exempt
- JR = Junior Accelerator Programme entrant
- CO = College Accelerator Programme entrant
- NG = Next Gen Accelerator Program entrant
- w/o = Walkover
- r = Retired
- d = Defaulted

=== Finals ===
Semifinals
(Australia) **Wayne Arthurs** **(Australia) Peter Tramacchi**	**6**	**7**
3	(Russia) Yevgeny Kafelnikov (Czech Republic) Daniel Vacek	4	6
4	(Canada) **Sébastien Lareau** **(United States) Alex O'Brien**	**6**	**6**
2	(Australia) Todd Woodbridge (Australia) Mark Woodforde	3	2

Final
(Australia) **Wayne Arthurs** **(Australia) Peter Tramacchi**	**7**	1	**6**
4	(Canada) Sébastien Lareau (United States) Alex O'Brien	6	**6**	3

=== Top half ===
First round
(Australia) **W Arthurs** **(Australia) P Tramacchi**	3	**6**	**6**
(Argentina) D Orsanic (Netherlands) J Siemerink	**6**	2	3
(France) **O Delaître** **(United States) J Tarango**	**7**	**6**
(South Africa) M Barnard (South Africa) B Talbot	6	3
(South Africa) **N Godwin** **(Italy) V Santopadre**	**6**	**6**
7	(Spain) Julián Alonso (Spain) Javier Sánchez	3	4
(Germany) **N Kiefer** **(Germany) A Rădulescu**	**6**	3	**6**
(Australia) J Holmes (Czech Republic) T Anzari	4	**6**	0
(Hungary) **G Köves** **(Philippines) E Taino**	**6**	1	**6**
(Netherlands) S Noteboom (Netherlands) F Wibier	3	**6**	3
(United States) **S Humphries** **(United States) J Salzenstein**	**6**	**7**
6	(United States) J Gimelstob (United States) Jonathan Stark	4	6

Second round
1	(India) M Bhupathi (India) L Paes	3	3
(Australia) **W Arthurs** **(Australia) P Tramacchi**	**6**	**6**
(France) **O Delaître** **(United States) J Tarango**	**7**	**7**
(South Africa) N Godwin (Italy) V Santopadre	5	5
3	(Russia) **Y Kafelnikov** **(Czech Republic) D Vacek**	**6**	**6**
(Germany) N Kiefer (Germany) A Rădulescu	4	4
(Hungary) G Köves (Philippines) E Taino	3	5
(United States) **S Humphries** **(United States) J Salzenstein**	**6**	**7**

Quarterfinals
(Australia) **W Arthurs** **(Australia) P Tramacchi**	2	**6**	**7**
(France) O Delaître (United States) J Tarango	**6**	3	5
3	(Russia) **Y Kafelnikov** **(Czech Republic) D Vacek**	**7**	5	**6**
(United States) S Humphries (United States) J Salzenstein	5	**7**	3

Semifinals
(Australia) **W Arthurs** **(Australia) P Tramacchi**	**6**	**7**
3	(Russia) Y Kafelnikov (Czech Republic) D Vacek	4	6

=== Bottom half ===
First round
5	(Germany) **M-K Goellner** **(Germany) D Prinosil**	**6**	**6**
(United States) M Keil (United States) TJ Middleton	3	3
(United States) **D Bowen** **(Argentina) M Hood**	4	**6**	**6**
(Brazil) G Kuerten (Belarus) M Mirnyi	**6**	2	3
(Argentina) **L Arnold** **(Argentina) L Lobo**	**7**	**7**
(Czech Republic) C Doseděl (Armenia) S Sargsian	6	5
8	(Argentina) **P Albano** **(Ecuador) N Lapentti**	**6**	**6**
(United States) J Blake (United States) T Blake	4	3
(Israel) **N Behr** **(Israel) E Erlich**	**6**	**6**
(France) G Raoux (France) F Santoro	2	2
(United States) **G Grant** **(United States) P McEnroe**	**7**	**7**
(Croatia) G Ivanišević (United States) G Van Emburgh	5	5

Second round
5	(Germany) **M-K Goellner** **(Germany) D Prinosil**	**6**	**6**
(United States) D Bowen (Argentina) M Hood	3	1
(Argentina) L Arnold (Argentina) L Lobo	6	2
4	(Canada) **S Lareau** **(United States) A O'Brien**	**7**	**6**
8	(Argentina) **P Albano** **(Ecuador) N Lapentti**	**6**	**6**
(Israel) N Behr (Israel) E Erlich	4	3
(United States) G Grant (United States) P McEnroe	6	5
2	(Australia) **T Woodbridge** **(Australia) M Woodforde**	**7**	**7**

Quarterfinals
5	(Germany) M-K Goellner (Germany) D Prinosil	6	3
4	(Canada) **S Lareau** **(United States) A O'Brien**	**7**	**6**
8	(Argentina) P Albano (Ecuador) N Lapentti	5	3
2	(Australia) **T Woodbridge** **(Australia) M Woodforde**	**7**	**6**

Semifinals
4	(Canada) **S Lareau** **(United States) A O'Brien**	**6**	**6**
2	(Australia) T Woodbridge (Australia) M Woodforde	3	2
