= 2001 Qatar Open – Singles =

Singles
- 2001 Qatar Open

Final
- Champion: (Chile) Marcelo Ríos
- Runner-up: (Czech Republic) Bohdan Ulihrach
- Score: 6–3, 2–6, 6–3

Details
- Draw: 32
- Seeds: 8

Events
Singles	Doubles
← 2000 ·	ATP Qatar Open	· 2002 →

Fabrice Santoro was the defending champion but lost in the first round to Gianluca Pozzi.

Marcelo Ríos won in the final 6–3, 2–6, 6–3 against Bohdan Ulihrach.

== Seeds ==
1. (Russia) Yevgeny Kafelnikov (quarterfinals)
2. (Germany) Nicolas Kiefer (quarterfinals)
3. (Netherlands) Sjeng Schalken (second round)
4. (Morocco) Younes El Aynaoui (first round)
5. (Switzerland) Marc Rosset (second round)
6. (Morocco) Hicham Arazi (quarterfinals)
7. (France) Fabrice Santoro (first round)
8. (Argentina) Gastón Gaudio (first round)

== Draw ==
=== Key ===
- Q = Qualifier
- WC = Wild card
- LL = Lucky loser
- Alt = Alternate
- ITF = ITF entry
- PR = Protected ranking
- SR = Special ranking
- SE = Special exempt
- JE = Junior exempt
- JR = Junior Accelerator Programme entrant
- CO = College Accelerator Programme entrant
- NG = Next Gen Accelerator Program entrant
- w/o = Walkover
- r = Retired
- d = Defaulted

=== Finals ===
Semifinals
Q	(Czech Republic) Bohdan Ulihrach	3	7	7^{9}
(France) Nicolas Escudé	6	5	6^{7}
(Chile) Marcelo Ríos	6	6
(Belarus) Vladimir Voltchkov	1	3

Final
Q	(Czech Republic) Bohdan Ulihrach	3	6	3
(Chile) Marcelo Ríos	6	2	6

=== Top half ===
First round
1	(Russia) Y Kafelnikov	6	6
(Spain) F Clavet	2	2
(Italy) D Sanguinetti	5	3
Q	(Sweden) F Jonsson	7	6
Q	(Czech Republic) B Ulihrach	6	4	7
Q	(France) N Coutelot	2	6	5
WC	(Qatar) S Khalfan	3	2
5	(Switzerland) M Rosset	6	6
WC/4	(Morocco) Y El Aynaoui	1	6^{4}
(France) N Escudé	6	7^{7}
WC	(Croatia) G Ivanišević	4	4
(France) J Boutter	6	6
(Argentina) M Zabaleta	1	4
(France) A di Pasquale	6	6
(Spain) A Portas	6^{5}	4
6	(Morocco) H Arazi	7^{7}	6

Second round
1	(Russia) Y Kafelnikov	6	7^{7}
Q	(Sweden) F Jonsson	3	6^{3}
Q	(Czech Republic) B Ulihrach	6	6
5	(Switzerland) M Rosset	2	3
(France) N Escudé	6	6
(France) J Boutter	3	4
(France) A di Pasquale	4	5
6	(Morocco) H Arazi	6	7

Quarterfinals
1	(Russia) Y Kafelnikov	6	6^{5}	4
Q	(Czech Republic) B Ulihrach	1	7^{7}	6
(France) N Escudé	6	6
6	(Morocco) H Arazi	3	1

Semifinals
Q	(Czech Republic) B Ulihrach	3	7	7^{9}
(France) N Escudé	6	5	6^{7}

=== Bottom half ===
First round
7	(France) F Santoro	6	3	6^{3}
(Italy) G Pozzi	1	6	7^{7}
Q	(Federal Republic of Yugoslavia) N Zimonjić	4	6	1
(Chile) M Ríos	6	3	6
(Spain) F Vicente	6	7^{7}
(Germany) R Schüttler	4	6^{5}
(Morocco) K Alami	3	1
3	(Netherlands) S Schalken	6	6
8	(Argentina) G Gaudio	6	2	3
(Belarus) V Voltchkov	3	6	6
(Germany) D Prinosil	6^{4}	4
(Belarus) M Mirnyi	7^{7}	6
(Austria) S Koubek	5	6	4
(Spain) Á Calatrava	7	4	6
(Sweden) J Björkman	6	1	5
2	(Germany) N Kiefer	4	6	7

Second round
(Italy) G Pozzi	2	2
(Chile) M Ríos	6	6
(Spain) F Vicente	6	5	6
3	(Netherlands) S Schalken	1	7	1
(Belarus) V Voltchkov	4	6	7
(Belarus) M Mirnyi	6	3	5
(Spain) Á Calatrava	0	6^{2}
2	(Germany) N Kiefer	6	7^{7}

Quarterfinals
(Chile) M Ríos	7^{7}	7
(Spain) F Vicente	6^{4}	5
(Belarus) V Voltchkov	6	6
2	(Germany) N Kiefer	2	1

Semifinals
(Chile) M Ríos	6	6
(Belarus) V Voltchkov	1	3

== Qualifying ==
=== Seeds ===
1. (Spain) Juan Balcells (second round)
2. (Czech Republic) Bohdan Ulihrach (Qualifier)
3. (Hungary) Attila Sávolt (second round)
4. (France) Nicolas Coutelot (Qualifier)
5. (Slovakia) Ján Krošlák (second round)
6. (Italy) Filippo Volandri (second round)
7. (Germany) Lars Burgsmüller (first round)
8. (Spain) Juan Albert Viloca (final round)

=== Qualifiers ===
1. (Sweden) Fredrik Jonsson
2. (Czech Republic) Bohdan Ulihrach
3. (Federal Republic of Yugoslavia) Nenad Zimonjić
4. (France) Nicolas Coutelot

=== Draw ===
==== First qualifier ====
First round
1	(Spain) Juan Balcells	6^{3}	6	7
(Sweden) Marcus Sarstrand	7^{7}	3	5
(Italy) Renzo Furlan	6	6
(Spain) Marc Fornell	2	2
(Germany) Andy Fahlke	2	2
(Sweden) Fredrik Jonsson	6	6
(Canada) Daniel Nestor	2	0
6	(Italy) Filippo Volandri	6	6

Second round
1	(Spain) Juan Balcells	4	7^{7}	3
(Italy) Renzo Furlan	6	6^{3}	6
(Sweden) Fredrik Jonsson	6	6
6	(Italy) Filippo Volandri	3	3

Final Round
(Italy) Renzo Furlan	4	3
(Sweden) Fredrik Jonsson	6	6

==== Second qualifier ====
First round
2	(Czech Republic) Bohdan Ulihrach	7	6
WC	(Russia) Kirill Ivanov-Smolensky	5	3
WC	(Croatia) Mario Ančić	4	6	6
(Switzerland) Ivo Heuberger	6	1	0
(France) Paul-Henri Mathieu	6	6
(Netherlands) Melvyn op der Heijde	1	2
(Italy) Marzio Martelli	4	6^{4}
5	(Slovakia) Ján Krošlák	6	7^{7}

Second round
2	(Czech Republic) Bohdan Ulihrach	6	6
WC	(Croatia) Mario Ančić	3	2
(France) Paul-Henri Mathieu	6	6
5	(Slovakia) Ján Krošlák	3	1

Final Round
2	(Czech Republic) Bohdan Ulihrach	6	1	7^{7}
(France) Paul-Henri Mathieu	2	6	6^{5}

==== Third qualifier ====
First round
3	(Hungary) Attila Sávolt	6	6
WC	(Qatar) Nasser Al-Khulafi	2	1
(Greece) Vasilis Mazarakis	4	4
(Federal Republic of Yugoslavia) Nenad Zimonjić	6	6
(The Bahamas) Mark Knowles	7^{7}	1	4
(Belgium) Dick Norman	6^{5}	6	6
(Germany) Alexander Waske	7	6
7	(Germany) Lars Burgsmüller	5	2

Second round
3	(Hungary) Attila Sávolt	3	1^{r}
(Federal Republic of Yugoslavia) Nenad Zimonjić	6	2
(Belgium) Dick Norman	4	6	3
(Germany) Alexander Waske	6	1	6

Final Round
(Federal Republic of Yugoslavia) Nenad Zimonjić	6	6
(Germany) Alexander Waske	3	2

==== Fourth qualifier ====
First round
4	(France) Nicolas Coutelot	3	6	6
(Italy) Federico Luzzi	6	4	4
(France) Jean-François Bachelot	6	6
Alt	(Italy) Uros Vico	3	3
(Spain) Oscar Burrieza	6	7^{7}
(Russia) Igor Kunitcin	4	6^{1}
WC	(Kuwait) Mohammad Ghareeb	2	6	6^{10}
8	(Spain) Juan Albert Viloca	6	4	7^{12}

Second round
4	(France) Nicolas Coutelot	6	6
(France) Jean-François Bachelot	3	2
(Spain) Oscar Burrieza	6	3	5
8	(Spain) Juan Albert Viloca	2	6	7

Final Round
4	(France) Nicolas Coutelot	6	6
8	(Spain) Juan Albert Viloca	3	2
