= 1998 Pilot Pen International – Men's singles =

Men's singles
- 1998 Pilot Pen International

Final
- Champion: (Slovakia) Karol Kučera
- Runner-up: (Croatia) Goran Ivanišević
- Score: 6–4, 5–7, 6–2

Details
- Draw: 56
- Seeds: 16

Events
Singles	men	women
Doubles	men	women
← 1997 ·	Pilot Pen International

The 1998 Pilot Pen International was a tennis tournament played on outdoor hard courts at the Cullman-Heyman Tennis Center in New Haven, Connecticut, in the United States that was part of the International Series Gold of the 1998 ATP Tour and of Tier II of the 1998 WTA Tour. The men's tournament was held from August 17 through August 23, 1998, while the women's tournament was held from August 24 through August 30, 1998.

== Seeds ==
Champion seeds are indicated in bold text while text in italics indicates the round in which those seeds were eliminated.

1. (United States) Pete Sampras (third round)
2. (Australia) Patrick Rafter (third round)
3. (Czech Republic) Petr Korda (third round)
4. (Netherlands) Richard Krajicek (semifinals)
5. (Russia) Yevgeny Kafelnikov (semifinals)
6. (United Kingdom) Tim Henman (quarterfinals)
7. (Slovakia) **Karol Kučera (champion)**
8. (Croatia) Goran Ivanišević (final)
9. (Netherlands) Jan Siemerink (third round)
10. (Germany) Goran Ivanišević (third round)
11. (Brazil) Gustavo Kuerten (third round)
12. (France) Fabrice Santoro (second round)
13. (Czech Republic) Bohdan Ulihrach (quarterfinals)
14. (France) Nicolas Escudé (first round)
15. (Switzerland) Marc Rosset (first round)
16. (France) Guillaume Raoux (quarterfinals)

== Draw ==
=== Key ===
- Q = Qualifier
- WC = Wild card
- LL = Lucky loser
- Alt = Alternate
- ITF = ITF entry
- PR = Protected ranking
- SR = Special ranking
- SE = Special exempt
- JE = Junior exempt
- JR = Junior Accelerator Programme entrant
- CO = College Accelerator Programme entrant
- NG = Next Gen Accelerator Program entrant
- w/o = Walkover
- r = Retired
- d = Defaulted

=== Finals ===
Semifinals
8	**(Croatia) Goran Ivanišević**	**6**	**6**
5	(Russia) Yevgeny Kafelnikov	3	4
4	(Netherlands) Richard Krajicek	6	4
7	**(Slovakia) Karol Kučera**	**7**	**6**

Final
8	(Croatia) Goran Ivanišević	4	**7**	2
7	**(Slovakia) Karol Kučera**	**6**	5	**6**

=== Top half ===
==== Section 1 ====
First round
**(Australia) L Hewitt**	**6**	**6**
(Armenia) S Sargsian	3	4
**(Spain) S Bruguera**	**7**	3	**6**
(United States) P McEnroe	6	**6**	3
**(India) L Paes**	**6**	**6**
15	(Switzerland) M Rosset	3	0
10	**(Germany) N Kiefer**	**6**	**6**
(Germany) L Burgsmüller	3	3
**(Australia) M Woodforde**	**6**	**7**
(Russia) M Safin	4	5
**(United States) G Grant**	**6**	**6**
(Czech Republic) C Doseděl	2	3

Second round
1	**(United States) P Sampras**	**6**	**7**
(Australia) L Hewitt	1	6
(Spain) S Bruguera	1	2
**(India) L Paes**	**6**	**6**
10	**(Germany) N Kiefer**	**6**	**7**
(Australia) M Woodforde	0	5
(United States) G Grant	3	**6**	3
8	**(Croatia) G Ivanišević**	**6**	3	**6**

Third round
1	(United States) P Sampras	3	4
**(India) L Paes**	**6**	**6**
10	(Germany) N Kiefer	3	5
8	**(Croatia) G Ivanišević**	**6**	**7**

Quarterfinals
(India) L Paes	2	4
8	**(Croatia) G Ivanišević**	**6**	**6**

==== Section 2 ====
First round
**(Ukraine) A Medvedev**	**7**	**6**
(Israel) E Erlich	6	3
**(Denmark) K Carlsen**	**7**	**6**
(Germany) D Prinosil	6	4
13	**(Czech Republic) B Ulihrach**	**6**	**6**
(Spain) J Sánchez	1	1
11	**(Brazil) G Kuerten**	**6**	**6**
(Argentina) M Puerta	3	4
**(United States) A O'Brien**	**6**	**6**
(Belarus) M Mirnyi	3	4
**(Australia) T Woodbridge**	3	**6**	**6**
(Germany) M-K Goellner	**6**	4	3

Second round
3	**(Czech Republic) P Korda**	**6**	3	**6**
(Ukraine) A Medvedev	3	**6**	1
(Denmark) K Carlsen	**6**	4	4
13	**(Czech Republic) B Ulihrach**	3	**6**	**6**
11	**(Brazil) G Kuerten**	**6**	**6**
(United States) A O'Brien	3	2
(Australia) T Woodbridge	0	2
5	**(Russia) Y Kafelnikov**	**6**	**6**

Third round
3	(Czech Republic) P Korda	6	3
13	**(Czech Republic) B Ulihrach**	**7**	**6**
11	(Brazil) G Kuerten	4	4
5	**(Russia) Y Kafelnikov**	**6**	**6**

Quarterfinals
13	(Czech Republic) B Ulihrach	**6**	3	3
5	**(Russia) Y Kafelnikov**	4	**6**	**6**

=== Bottom half ===
==== Section 3 ====
First round
**(Italy) V Santopadre**	**6**	**6**
(Germany) A Rădulescu	2	3
**(Italy) D Sanguinetti**	**6**	**7**
(United States) J Stark	4	5
12	**(France) F Santoro**	1	**6**	**6**
(Argentina) L Arnold	**6**	3	1
**(Germany) R Schüttler**	4	**6**	**6**
14	(France) N Escudé	**6**	4	3
**(Israel) H Levy**	**7**	**6**
(Argentina) G Cañas	5	3
**(United States) M Washington**	**6**	**6**
(Canada) S Lareau	4	4

Second round
6	**(United Kingdom) T Henman**	**6**	**6**
(Italy) V Santopadre	2	3
**(Italy) D Sanguinetti**	**6**	6	**7**
12	(France) F Santoro	1	**7**	5
(Germany) R Schüttler	3	3
**(Israel) H Levy**	**6**	**6**
(United States) M Washington	5	4
4	**(Netherlands) R Krajicek**	**7**	**6**

Third round
6	**(United Kingdom) T Henman**	4	**6**	**6**
(Italy) D Sanguinetti	**6**	3	3
(Israel) H Levy	2	4
4	**(Netherlands) R Krajicek**	**6**	**6**

Quarterfinals
6	(United Kingdom) T Henman	**7**	2	6
4	**(Netherlands) R Krajicek**	5	**6**	**7**

==== Section 4 ====
First round
**(Argentina) H Gumy**	5
(Czech Republic) D Vacek	3^{r}
**(Netherlands) D van Scheppingen**	**6**
(Switzerland) I Heuberger	4^{r}
9	**(Netherlands) J Siemerink**	**6**	**6**
(Ecuador) N Lapentti	4	3
16	**(France) G Raoux**	**7**	**6**
(United States) J Gimelstob	6	4
**(Netherlands) J van Lottum**	**6**	**6**
(Spain) J Alonso	4	2
**(United States) J Tarango**	**6**	**6**
(France) L Roux	2	2

Second round
7	**(Slovakia) K Kučera**	**6**	**6**
(Argentina) H Gumy	3	3
(Netherlands) D van Scheppingen	3	3
9	**(Netherlands) J Siemerink**	**6**	**6**
16	**(France) G Raoux**	**6**	**6**
(Netherlands) J van Lottum	3	4
(United States) J Tarango	2	1
2	**(Australia) P Rafter**	**6**	**6**

Third round
7	**(Slovakia) K Kučera**	**6**	**7**
9	(Netherlands) J Siemerink	4	5
16	**(France) G Raoux**	**7**	**6**
2	(Australia) P Rafter	6	3

Quarterfinals
7	**(Slovakia) K Kučera**	3	**6**	**6**
16	(France) G Raoux	**6**	3	1
