= 2000 Qatar Open =

- Date: 3–10 January 2000
- Edition: 8th
- Category: International Series
- Draw: 32S / 16D
- Prize money: $975,000
- Surface: Hard / outdoor
- Location: Doha, Qatar

Champions

Singles
- (France) Fabrice Santoro

Doubles
- (The Bahamas) Mark Knowles / (Belarus) Max Mirnyi
← 1999 ·	ATP Qatar Open	· 2001 →

The 2000 Qatar Open, known as the 2000 Qatar ExxonMobil Open for sponsorship reasons, was a men's tennis tournament held in Doha, Qatar and played on outdoor hard courts. The event was part of the International Series of the 2000 ATP Tour. It was the eighth edition of the tournament and was held from 3 January through 10 January 2000. Third-seeded Fabrice Santoro won the singles title.

== Finals ==
=== Singles ===
(France) Fabrice Santoro defeated (Germany) Rainer Schüttler, 3–6, 7–5, 3–0 ret.

=== Doubles ===
(The Bahamas) Mark Knowles / (Belarus) Max Mirnyi defeated (United States) Alex O'Brien / (United States) Jared Palmer, 6–3, 6–4
