= 2000 Qatar Open – Doubles =

Doubles
- 2000 Qatar Open

Final
- Champions: (The Bahamas) Mark Knowles (Belarus) Max Mirnyi
- Runners-up: (United States) Alex O'Brien (United States) Jared Palmer
- Score: 6–3, 6–4

Details
- Draw: 16
- Seeds: 4

Events
Singles	Doubles
← 1999 ·	ATP Qatar Open	· 2001 →

Alex O'Brien and Jared Palmer were the defending champions.

Mark Knowles and Max Mirnyi won in the final 6–3, 6–4, against O'Brien and Palmer.

== Seeds ==
1. (United States) Alex O'Brien / (United States) Jared Palmer (final)
2. (South Africa) David Adams / (South Africa) John-Laffnie de Jager (semifinals)
3. (United States) Jeff Tarango / (Czech Republic) Daniel Vacek (quarterfinals)
4. (France) Olivier Delaître / (France) Fabrice Santoro (semifinals)

== Draw ==
=== Key ===
- Q = Qualifier
- WC = Wild card
- LL = Lucky loser
- Alt = Alternate
- ITF = ITF entry
- PR = Protected ranking
- SR = Special ranking
- SE = Special exempt
- JE = Junior exempt
- JR = Junior Accelerator Programme entrant
- CO = College Accelerator Programme entrant
- NG = Next Gen Accelerator Program entrant
- w/o = Walkover
- r = Retired
- d = Defaulted

=== Draw ===
First round
1	(United States) A O'Brien (United States) J Palmer	6^{3}	7	6
(Russia) A Olhovskiy (Netherlands) J Siemerink	7^{7}	5	4
(Sweden) M Tillström (Serbia and Montenegro) N Zimonjić	7^{7}	6
Q	(Germany) L Burgsmüller (Netherlands) S Schalken	6^{2}	3
4	(France) O Delaître (France) F Santoro	3	6	6
WC	(United States) L Jensen (United States) M Jensen	6	3	1
WC	(Croatia) G Ivanišević (Germany) N Kiefer	6	0	6^{2}
(Australia) D Macpherson (Sweden) P Nyborg	2	6	7^{7}
(The Bahamas) M Knowles (Belarus) M Mirnyi	6	6
(South Africa) M Barnard (South Africa) C Haggard	4	4
(South Africa) L Bale (North Macedonia) A Kitinov	6^{8}	4
3	(United States) J Tarango (Czech Republic) D Vacek	7^{10}	6
(Czech Republic) J Novák (Czech Republic) C Suk	6^{3}	7	6
WC	(Morocco) H Arazi (Belgium) T Vanhoudt	7^{7}	5	4
(Spain) T Carbonell (Spain) J Sánchez	3	4
2	(South Africa) D Adams (South Africa) J-L de Jager	6	6

Quarterfinals
1	(United States) A O'Brien (United States) J Palmer	6	6
(Sweden) M Tillström (Serbia and Montenegro) N Zimonjić	2	2
4	(France) O Delaître (France) F Santoro	6	6^{1}	7^{7}
(Australia) D Macpherson (Sweden) P Nyborg	4	7^{7}	6^{2}
(The Bahamas) M Knowles (Belarus) M Mirnyi	6	6
3	(United States) J Tarango (Czech Republic) D Vacek	3	4
(Czech Republic) J Novák (Czech Republic) C Suk	3	7	4
2	(South Africa) D Adams (South Africa) J-L de Jager	6	5	6

Semifinals
1	(United States) A O'Brien (United States) J Palmer	6	7^{7}
4	(France) O Delaître (France) F Santoro	2	6^{0}
(The Bahamas) M Knowles (Belarus) M Mirnyi	2	6	6
2	(South Africa) D Adams (South Africa) J-L de Jager	6	3	4

Final
1	(United States) A O'Brien (United States) J Palmer	3	4
(The Bahamas) M Knowles (Belarus) M Mirnyi	6	6
