= 1997 Pilot Pen International – Singles =

Singles
- 1997 Pilot Pen International

Final
- Champion: (Russia) Yevgeny Kafelnikov
- Runner-up: (Australia) Patrick Rafter
- Score: 7–6^{(7–4)}, 6–4

Details
- Draw: 56 (5WC/7Q)
- Seeds: 16

Events
Singles	Doubles
← 1996 ·	Pilot Pen International	· 1998 →

Alex O'Brien was the defending champion, but lost in the second round to Marc-Kevin Goellner.

Yevgeny Kafelnikov won the title by defeating Patrick Rafter 7–6^{(7–4)}, 6–4 in the final.

== Seeds ==
The first eight seeds received a bye into the second round.

1. (Russia) Yevgeny Kafelnikov (champion)
2. (Spain) Sergi Bruguera (quarterfinals)
3. (Australia) Mark Philippoussis (second round)
4. (Netherlands) Richard Krajicek (quarterfinals)
5. (Czech Republic) Petr Korda (semifinals)
6. (Spain) Albert Costa (third round)
7. (United Kingdom) Tim Henman (quarterfinals)
8. (Australia) Patrick Rafter (final)
9. (Ukraine) Andrei Medvedev (third round)
10. (United States) Jim Courier (first round)
11. (United Kingdom) Greg Rusedski (semifinals)
12. (Sweden) Magnus Norman (first round)
13. (Switzerland) Marc Rosset (first round)
14. (United States) Alex O'Brien (second round)
15. (Slovakia) Karol Kučera (first round)
16. (Netherlands) Jan Siemerink (second round)

== Draw ==
=== Key ===
- Q = Qualifier
- WC = Wild card
- LL = Lucky loser
- Alt = Alternate
- ITF = ITF entry
- PR = Protected ranking
- SR = Special ranking
- SE = Special exempt
- JE = Junior exempt
- JR = Junior Accelerator Programme entrant
- CO = College Accelerator Programme entrant
- NG = Next Gen Accelerator Program entrant
- w/o = Walkover
- r = Retired
- d = Defaulted

=== Finals ===
Quarterfinals
1	(Russia) Yevgeny Kafelnikov	5	6	6
7	(United Kingdom) Tim Henman	7	3	4
(United States) David Wheaton	6	6^{7}	4
5	(Czech Republic) Petr Korda	4	7^{9}	6
11	(United Kingdom) Greg Rusedski	7^{7}	3	6
4	(Netherlands) Richard Krajicek	6^{5}	6	3
8	(Australia) Patrick Rafter	7	2	6
2	(Spain) Sergi Bruguera	5	6	2

Semifinals
1	(Russia) Yevgeny Kafelnikov	6	7^{7}
5	(Czech Republic) Petr Korda	4	6^{4}
11	(United Kingdom) Greg Rusedski	5	6	3
8	(Australia) Patrick Rafter	7	4	6

Final
1	(Russia) Yevgeny Kafelnikov	7^{7}	6
8	(Australia) Patrick Rafter	6^{4}	4

=== Top half ===
==== Section 1 ====
First round
Q	(Philippines) C Mamiit	6	7
(Netherlands) F Wibier	2	5
WC	(United States) B MacPhie	1	6	1
(Czech Republic) S Doseděl	6	4	6
(United States) V Spadea	6	6
15	(Czech Republic) K Kučera	3	2
10	(United States) J Courier	2	2
(New Zealand) B Steven	6	6
Q	(Mexico) A Hernández	1	6	4
(Romania) D Pescariu	6	0	6
(Germany) D Prinosil	2	4
(Czech Republic) D Vacek	6	6

Second round
1	(Russia) Y Kafelnikov	5	6	6
Q	(Philippines) C Mamiit	7	1	3
(Czech Republic) S Doseděl	7	3	6
(United States) V Spadea	5	6	3
(New Zealand) B Steven	6	0	6
(Romania) D Pescariu	4	6	3
(Czech Republic) D Vacek	6	6^{3}	4
7	(United Kingdom) T Henman	4	7^{7}	6

Third round
1	(Russia) Y Kafelnikov	6	6
(Czech Republic) S Doseděl	2	3
(New Zealand) B Steven	4	4
7	(United Kingdom) T Henman	6	6

Quarterfinals
1	(Russia) Y Kafelnikov	5	6	6
7	(United Kingdom) T Henman	7	3	4

==== Section 2 ====
First round
(United States) D Wheaton	6	6^{6}	6
(India) L Paes	3	7^{8}	3
(Germany) MK Goellner	7^{7}	6
(United States) P McEnroe	6^{5}	1
WC	(Croatia) I Ljubičić	3	1
14	(United States) A O'Brien	6	6
12	(Sweden) M Norman	3	2
(Netherlands) P Haarhuis	6	6
(Spain) J Sánchez	6	6^{6}	7
Q	(India) M Bhupathi	2	7^{8}	5
WC	(United States) JM Gambill	7^{7}	7
(Belgium) F Dewulf	6^{1}	5

Second round
3	(Australia) M Philippoussis	7^{7}	3	4
(United States) D Wheaton	6^{2}	6	6
(Germany) MK Goellner	7	6
14	(United States) A O'Brien	5	3
(Netherlands) P Haarhuis	6	3	3
(Spain) J Sánchez	3	6	6
WC	(United States) JM Gambill	3	3
5	(Czech Republic) P Korda	6	6

Third round
(United States) D Wheaton	7^{8}	6
(Germany) MK Goellner	6^{6}	4
(Spain) J Sánchez	2	4
5	(Czech Republic) P Korda	6	6

Quarterfinals
(United States) D Wheaton	6	6^{7}	4
5	(Czech Republic) P Korda	4	7^{9}	6

=== Bottom half ===
==== Section 3 ====
First round
(Bulgaria) O Stanoytchev	4	1
Q	(Zimbabwe) W Black	6	6
Q	(United States) D Caldwell	2	4
WC	(United States) J Salzenstein	6	6
Q	(Netherlands) P Wessels	3	2
11	(United Kingdom) G Rusedski	6	6
13	(Switzerland) M Rosset	6	1	3
(Armenia) S Sargsian	4	6	6
(Argentina) H Gumy	6	4	2
(Denmark) K Carlsen	2	6	6
(Ecuador) N Lapentti	6
(Netherlands) S Schalken	1	r

Second round
6	(Spain) A Costa	6	6
Q	(Zimbabwe) W Black	1	1
WC	(United States) J Salzenstein	4	0
11	(United Kingdom) G Rusedski	6	6
(Armenia) S Sargsian	4	7^{7}	1
(Denmark) K Carlsen	6	6^{2}	6
(Ecuador) N Lapentti	4	3
4	(Netherlands) R Krajicek	6	6

Third round
6	(Spain) A Costa	3	6^{5}
11	(United Kingdom) G Rusedski	6	7^{7}
(Denmark) K Carlsen	6^{1}	2
4	(Netherlands) R Krajicek	7^{7}	6

Quarterfinals
11	(United Kingdom) G Rusedski	7^{7}	3	6
4	(Netherlands) R Krajicek	6^{5}	6	3

==== Section 4 ====
First round
(Brazil) J Oncins	6^{4}	4
(Italy) M Martelli	7^{7}	6
(Brazil) F Meligeni	7^{7}	7^{8}
(United States) J Tarango	6^{4}	6^{6}
Q	(Israel) N Welgreen	3	3
9	(Ukraine) A Medvedev	6	6
16	(Netherlands) J Siemerink	7^{7}	4	6
(Uzbekistan) O Ogorodov	6^{1}	6	1
(Canada) S Lareau	3	1
WC	(Spain) F Clavet	6	6
(Zimbabwe) B Black	6	6
(Italy) R Furlan	1	2

Second round
8	(Australia) P Rafter	6	6
(Italy) M Martelli	3	4
(Brazil) F Meligeni	6^{4}	2
9	(Ukraine) A Medvedev	7^{7}	6
16	(Netherlands) J Siemerink	6	3	6^{5}
WC	(Spain) F Clavet	1	6	7^{7}
(Zimbabwe) B Black	3	2
2	(Spain) S Bruguera	6	6

Third round
8	(Australia) P Rafter	6	2	6
9	(Ukraine) A Medvedev	3	6	4
WC	(Spain) F Clavet	4	6^{4}
2	(Spain) S Bruguera	6	7^{7}

Quarterfinals
8	(Australia) P Rafter	7	2	6
2	(Spain) S Bruguera	5	6	2
