= 1997 Pilot Pen International – Doubles =

Doubles
- 1997 Pilot Pen International

Final
- Champions: (India) Mahesh Bhupathi (India) Leander Paes
- Runners-up: (Canada) Sébastien Lareau (United States) Alex O'Brien
- Score: 6–4, 6–7, 6–2

Details
- Draw: 28
- Seeds: 8

Events
Singles	Doubles
← 1996 ·	Pilot Pen International	· 1998 →

Byron Black and Grant Connell were the defending champions, but Connell did not compete this year. Black teamed up with Brett Steven and lost in the quarterfinals to Jacco Eltingh and Paul Haarhuis.

Mahesh Bhupathi and Leander Paes won the title by defeating Sébastien Lareau and Alex O'Brien 6–4, 6–7, 6–2 in the final.

== Seeds ==
The first four seeds received a bye into the second round.

1. (Netherlands) Jacco Eltingh / (Netherlands) Paul Haarhuis (semifinals)
2. (Russia) Yevgeny Kafelnikov / (Czech Republic) Daniel Vacek (quarterfinals)
3. (Canada) Sébastien Lareau / (United States) Alex O'Brien (final)
4. (Argentina) Luis Lobo / (Spain) Javier Sánchez (second round)
5. (Australia) Mark Philippoussis / (Australia) Patrick Rafter (first round)
6. (India) Mahesh Bhupathi / (India) Leander Paes (champions)
7. (United States) Luke Jensen / (United States) Murphy Jensen (first round)
8. (Germany) Marc-Kevin Goellner / (Russia) Andrei Olhovskiy (semifinals)

== Draw ==
=== Key ===
- Q = Qualifier
- WC = Wild card
- LL = Lucky loser
- Alt = Alternate
- SE = Special exempt
- PR = Protected ranking
- ITF = ITF entry
- JE = Junior exempt
- w/o = Walkover
- r = Retired
- d = Defaulted
- SR = Special ranking

=== Finals ===
Semifinals
1	(Netherlands) Jacco Eltingh (Netherlands) Paul Haarhuis	6	3	3
6	(India) Mahesh Bhupathi (India) Leander Paes	4	6	6
3	(Canada) Sébastien Lareau (United States) Alex O'Brien	6	6
8	(Germany) Marc-Kevin Goellner (Russia) Andrei Olhovskiy	4	4

Final
6	(India) Mahesh Bhupathi (India) Leander Paes	6	6	6
3	(Canada) Sébastien Lareau (United States) Alex O'Brien	4	7	2

=== Top half ===
First round
(Netherlands) J Siemerink (Netherlands) S Schalken	4	4
Q	(Sweden) M Norman (Germany) D Prinosil	6	6
Q	(Finland) T Ketola (Canada) S Leblanc	3	6	1
(Zimbabwe) B Black (New Zealand) B Steven	6	3	6
WC	(United Kingdom) T Henman (Czech Republic) P Korda	6	6
7/WC	(United States) L Jensen (United States) M Jensen	4	3
(Brazil) F Meligeni (Venezuela) N Pereira	6	6
(United States) D DiLucia (United States) B Shelton	3	4
(United States) S Davis (United States) K Jones	2	5
(Netherlands) S Noteboom (Netherlands) F Wibier	6	7
WC	(Federal Republic of Yugoslavia) N Đorđević (South Africa) C Haggard	4	5
6	(India) M Bhupathi (India) L Paes	6	7

Second round
1	(Netherlands) J Eltingh (Netherlands) P Haarhuis	6	6
Q	(Sweden) M Norman (Germany) D Prinosil	2	2
(Zimbabwe) B Black (New Zealand) B Steven	1	6	6
WC	(United Kingdom) T Henman (Czech Republic) P Korda	6	3	2
4	(Argentina) L Lobo (Spain) J Sánchez	7	4	3
(Brazil) F Meligeni (Venezuela) N Pereira	5	6	6
(Netherlands) S Noteboom (Netherlands) F Wibier	6	0
6	(India) M Bhupathi (India) L Paes	7	6

Quarterfinals
1	(Netherlands) J Eltingh (Netherlands) P Haarhuis	2	6	6
(Zimbabwe) B Black (New Zealand) B Steven	6	4	4
(Brazil) F Meligeni (Venezuela) N Pereira	6	3
6	(India) M Bhupathi (India) L Paes	7	6

Semifinals
1	(Netherlands) J Eltingh (Netherlands) P Haarhuis	6	3	3
6	(India) M Bhupathi (India) L Paes	4	6	6

=== Bottom half ===
First round
5	(Australia) M Philippoussis (Australia) P Rafter	6	6	4
WC	(United States) V Spadea (Philippines) E Taino	3	7	6
(Sweden) D Ekerot (United States) B Hansen-Dent	2	3
(United States) TJ Middleton (Armenia) S Sargsian	6	6
(United States) B MacPhie (United States) J Salzenstein	6	7
(Australia) P Kilderry (Ecuador) N Lapentti	3	6
8	(Germany) MK Goellner (Russia) A Olhovskiy	6	7	7
(Australia) P Cash (Australia) A Kratzmann	7	5	6
(Zimbabwe) W Black (United States) J Grabb	7	6	3
WC	(United Kingdom) G Rusedski (United States) D Wheaton	6	7	6
(Uzbekistan) O Ogorodov (Romania) D Pescariu	6	2	4
(United States) S Melville (United States) J Tarango	4	6	6

Second round
WC	(United States) V Spadea (Philippines) E Taino	2	4
(United States) TJ Middleton (Armenia) S Sargsian	6	6
(United States) B MacPhie (United States) J Salzenstein	6	4
3	(Canada) S Lareau (United States) A O'Brien	7	6
8	(Germany) MK Goellner (Russia) A Olhovskiy	w/o
WC	(United Kingdom) G Rusedski (United States) D Wheaton
(United States) S Melville (United States) J Tarango	4	6	6
2	(Russia) Y Kafelnikov (Czech Republic) D Vacek	6	1	7

Quarterfinals
(United States) TJ Middleton (Armenia) S Sargsian	3	5
3	(Canada) S Lareau (United States) A O'Brien	6	7
8	(Germany) MK Goellner (Russia) A Olhovskiy	7	7
2	(Russia) Y Kafelnikov (Czech Republic) D Vacek	5	5

Semifinals
3	(Canada) S Lareau (United States) A O'Brien	6	6
8	(Germany) MK Goellner (Russia) A Olhovskiy	4	4
