= 1997 U.S. Women's Hard Court Championships – Singles =

Singles
- 1997 U.S. Women's Hard Court Championships

Final
- Champion: (United States) Lindsay Davenport
- Runner-up: (France) Sandrine Testud
- Score: 6–4, 6–1

Details
- Draw: 28
- Seeds: 8

Events
Singles	Doubles
← 1994 ·	U.S. Women's Hard Court Championships	· 1998 →

Lindsay Davenport won in the final 6–4, 6–1 against Sandrine Testud.

== Seeds ==
A champion seed is indicated in bold text while text in italics indicates the round in which that seed was eliminated. The top four seeds received a bye to the second round.

1. (Czech Republic) Jana Novotná (quarterfinals)
2. (United States) Monica Seles (quarterfinals)
3. (Croatia) Iva Majoli (semifinals)
4. (United States) **Lindsay Davenport (champion)**
5. (South Africa) Amanda Coetzer (semifinals)
6. (Netherlands) Brenda Schultz-McCarthy (quarterfinals)
7. (Romania) Ruxandra Dragomir (second round)
8. (Slovakia) Karina Habšudová (first round)

== Draw ==
=== Key ===
- Q = Qualifier
- WC = Wild card
- LL = Lucky loser
- Alt = Alternate
- ITF = ITF entry
- PR = Protected ranking
- SR = Special ranking
- SE = Special exempt
- JE = Junior exempt
- JR = Junior Accelerator Programme entrant
- CO = College Accelerator Programme entrant
- NG = Next Gen Accelerator Program entrant
- w/o = Walkover
- r = Retired
- d = Defaulted

=== Final ===
Final
4	(United States) Lindsay Davenport	**6**	**6**
	(France) Sandrine Testud	4	1

=== Section 1 ===
First round
(Indonesia) **Y Basuki**	**6**	**7**
(Germany) M Babel	4	6
Q	(France) **N Tauziat**	**6**	**6**
(Sweden) Å Carlsson	4	3
WC	(United States) L Wild	1	2
5	(South Africa) **A Coetzer**	**6**	**6**
(Switzerland) **P Schnyder**	**6**	**6**
Q	(Argentina) F Labat	3	2
Q	(United States) A Miller	1	3
(Belgium) **D Van Roost**	**6**	**6**
(France) A-G Sidot	3	3
7	(Romania) **R Dragomir**	**6**	**6**

Second round
1	(Czech Republic) **J Novotná**	4	**6**	**6**
(Indonesia) Y Basuki	**6**	2	2
Q	(France) N Tauziat	2	**7**	2
5	(South Africa) **A Coetzer**	**6**	5	**6**
4	(United States) **L Davenport**	**6**	**6**
(Switzerland) P Schnyder	3	2
(Belgium) **D Van Roost**	**6**	**6**
7	(Romania) R Dragomir	0	2

Quarterfinals
1	(Czech Republic) J Novotná	**6**	3	1
5	(South Africa) **A Coetzer**	1	**6**	**6**
4	(United States) **L Davenport**	**6**	**7**
(Belgium) D Van Roost	1	5

Semifinals
5	(South Africa) A Coetzer	2	4
4	(United States) **L Davenport**	**6**	**6**

=== Section 2 ===
First round
6	(Netherlands) **B Schultz-McCarthy**	**7**	**7**
Q	(Canada) P Hy-Boulais	6	6
(Bulgaria) M Maleeva	3	6
LL	(Italy) **S Farina**	**6**	**7**
(Belgium) S Appelmans	**6**	6	2/r
(Russia) **E Likhovtseva**	4	**7**	**4**
8	(Slovakia) K Habšudová	3	1
(France) **S Testud**	**6**	**6**
(United States) **C Rubin**	**6**	**6**
(Czech Republic) H Suková	1	2
(Japan) **N Sawamatsu**	**7**	**6**
(Japan) A Sugiyama	6	4

Second round
6	(Netherlands) **B Schultz-McCarthy**	**1**
LL	(Italy) S Farina	1	r
(Russia) E Likhovtseva	2	**6**	4
3	(Croatia) **I Majoli**	**6**	3	**6**
(France) **S Testud**	**6**	**6**
(United States) C Rubin	4	1
(Japan) N Sawamatsu	4	3
2	(United States) **M Seles**	**6**	**6**

Quarterfinals
6	(Netherlands) B Schultz-McCarthy	2	5
3	(Croatia) **I Majoli**	**6**	**7**
(France) **S Testud**	**w/o**
2	(United States) M Seles

Semifinals
3	(Croatia) I Majoli	5	3
(France) **S Testud**	**7**	**6**
