= 1999 Qatar Open – Singles =

Singles
- 1999 Qatar Open

Final
- Champion: (Germany) Rainer Schüttler
- Runner-up: (United Kingdom) Tim Henman
- Score: 6–4, 5–7, 6–1

Details
- Draw: 32
- Seeds: 8

Events
| Singles | Doubles |
| ← 1998 · | ATP Qatar Open | · 2000 → |

Rainer Schüttler defeated Tim Henman 6–4, 5–7, 6–1 to win the 1999 Qatar Open singles competition. Petr Korda was the defending champion.

== Seeds ==
1. (United Kingdom) Tim Henman (final)
2. (United Kingdom) Greg Rusedski (first round)
3. (Russia) Yevgeny Kafelnikov (second round)
4. (Croatia) Goran Ivanišević (quarterfinals)
5. (Czech Republic) Petr Korda (first round)
6. (Sweden) Thomas Johansson (first round)
7. (France) Cédric Pioline (semifinals)
8. (Netherlands) Jan Siemerink (first round)

== Draw ==
=== Key ===
- Q = Qualifier
- WC = Wild card
- LL = Lucky loser
- Alt = Alternate
- SE = Special exempt
- PR = Protected ranking
- ITF = ITF entry
- JE = Junior exempt
- w/o = Walkover
- r = Retired
- d = Defaulted
- SR = Special ranking

=== Finals ===
Semifinals
1 | (United Kingdom) Tim Henman | 6 | 6
WC | (Morocco) Karim Alami | 4 | 2
Q | (Germany) Rainer Schüttler | 3 | 6 | 7
7 | (France) Cédric Pioline | 6 | 2 | 5

Final
1 | (United Kingdom) Tim Henman | 4 | 7 | 1
Q | (Germany) Rainer Schüttler | 6 | 5 | 6

=== Section 1 ===
First round
1 | (United Kingdom) T Henman | 6 | 6
(Netherlands) S Schalken | 2 | 3
(France) F Santoro | 4 | 1
(Morocco) Y El Aynaoui | 6 | 6
(Italy) D Sanguinetti | 1 | 2
(Spain) F Vicente | 6 | 6
(United States) J Tarango | 6 | 6
8 | (Netherlands) J Siemerink | 3 | 3
3 | (Russia) Y Kafelnikov | 2 | 6 | 6
Q | (France) S Huet | 6 | 3 | 4
(Russia) M Safin | 6 | 3 | 6^{5}
(Morocco) H Arazi | 1 | 6 | 7^{7}
(Argentina) F Squillari | 2 | 6 | 6
(Czech Republic) B Ulihrach | 6 | 1 | 4
WC | (Morocco) K Alami | 7^{7} | 2 | 6
5 | (Czech Republic) P Korda | 6^{5} | 6 | 3

Second round
1 | (United Kingdom) T Henman | 4 | 6 | 6
(Morocco) Y El Aynaoui | 6 | 3 | 0
(Spain) F Vicente | 3 | 5
(United States) J Tarango | 6 | 7
3 | (Russia) Y Kafelnikov | 6 | 1 | 6^{10}
(Morocco) H Arazi | 3 | 6 | 7^{12}
(Argentina) F Squillari | 2 | 7^{7} | 5
WC | (Morocco) K Alami | 6 | 6^{2} | 7

Quarterfinals
1 | (United Kingdom) T Henman | 6 | 6^{13} | 6
(United States) J Tarango | 4 | 7^{15} | 4
(Morocco) H Arazi | 1 | 7^{7} | 4
WC | (Morocco) K Alami | 6 | 6^{3} | 6

Semifinals
1 | (United Kingdom) T Henman | 6 | 6
WC | (Morocco) K Alami | 4 | 2

=== Section 2 ===
First round
6 | (Sweden) T Johansson | 1 | 2
(Czech Republic) D Vacek | 6 | 6
Q | (Germany) R Schüttler | 4 | 6 | 6
(Ukraine) A Medvedev | 6 | 3 | 2
(Belgium) F Dewulf | 1 | 6^{3}
Q | (Belgium) C van Garsse | 6 | 7^{7}
(Spain) F Clavet | 3 | 7^{7} | 4
4 | (Croatia) G Ivanišević | 6 | 6^{1} | 6
7 | (France) C Pioline | 6 | 6
(Costa Rica) J Marín | 3 | 1
WC | (Spain) J Sánchez | 6 | 6
Q | (Denmark) K Carlsen | 3 | 4
(Spain) C Costa | 3 | 4
(Argentina) M Zabaleta | 6 | 6
WC | (Germany) B Karbacher | 4 | 7^{7} | 6
2 | (United Kingdom) G Rusedski | 6 | 6^{3} | 3

Second round
(Czech Republic) D Vacek | 6^{3} | 3
Q | (Germany) R Schüttler | 7^{7} | 6
Q | (Belgium) C van Garsse | 3 | 0
4 | (Croatia) G Ivanišević | 6 | 6
7 | (France) C Pioline | 7^{7} | 6
WC | (Spain) J Sánchez | 6^{2} | 2
(Argentina) M Zabaleta | 6 | 3 | 7
WC | (Germany) B Karbacher | 0 | 6 | 5

Quarterfinals
Q | (Germany) R Schüttler | 6 | 6^{5} | 6
4 | (Croatia) G Ivanišević | 2 | 7^{7} | 2
7 | (France) C Pioline | 7^{7} | 6
(Argentina) M Zabaleta | 6^{2} | 2

Semifinals
Q | (Germany) R Schüttler | 3 | 6 | 7
7 | (France) C Pioline | 6 | 2 | 5
