= 1996 Pilot Pen International =

- Date: August 12–18
- Edition: 24th
- Category: Championship Series
- Draw: 64S / 32D
- Prize money: $915,000
- Surface: Hard / outdoor
- Location: New Haven, Connecticut, U.S.
- Venue: Cullman-Heyman Tennis Center

Champions

Singles
- (United States) Alex O'Brien

Doubles
- (Zimbabwe) Byron Black / (Canada) Grant Connell
- Pilot Pen International

The 1996 Pilot Pen International was a men's tennis tournament played on outdoor hard courts at the Cullman-Heyman Tennis Center in New Haven, Connecticut in the United States and was part of the Championship Series of the 1996 ATP Tour. It was the 24th edition of the tournament and ran from August 12 through August 18, 1996. Unseeded Alex O'Brien, who entered the draw on a wildcard, won the singles title.

== Finals ==
=== Singles ===
(United States) Alex O'Brien defeated (Netherlands) Jan Siemerink 7–6^{(8–6)}, 6–4

- It was O'Brien's only singles title of his career.

=== Doubles ===
(Zimbabwe) Byron Black / (Canada) Grant Connell defeated (Sweden) Jonas Björkman / (Sweden) Nicklas Kulti 6–4, 6–4

- It was Black's 5th title of the year and the 16th of his career. It was Connell's 4th title of the year and the 21st of his career.
