= 1998 Qatar Open – Singles =

Singles
- 1998 Qatar Open

Final
- Champion: (Czech Republic) Petr Korda
- Runner-up: (France) Fabrice Santoro
- Score: 6–0, 6–3

Details
- Draw: 32
- Seeds: 8

Events
Singles	Doubles
← 1997 ·	ATP Qatar Open	· 1999 →

Petr Korda defeated Fabrice Santoro 6–0, 6–3 to win the 1998 Qatar ExxonMobil Open singles competition. Jim Courier was the defending champion but did not defend his title.

== Seeds ==
Champion seeds are indicated in bold text while text in italics indicates the round in which those seeds were eliminated.

1. (United Kingdom) Greg Rusedski (quarterfinals)
2. (Spain) Sergi Bruguera (first round)
3. (Czech Republic) **Petr Korda (champion)**
4. (Croatia) Goran Ivanišević (semifinals)
5. (United Kingdom) Tim Henman (quarterfinals)
6. (Sweden) Magnus Larsson (second round, withdrew)
7. (Ukraine) Andrei Medvedev (semifinals)
8. (France) Fabrice Santoro (final)

== Draw ==
=== Key ===
- Q = Qualifier
- WC = Wild card
- LL = Lucky loser
- Alt = Alternate
- SE = Special exempt
- PR = Protected ranking
- ITF = ITF entry
- JE = Junior exempt
- w/o = Walkover
- r = Retired
- d = Defaulted
- SR = Special ranking

=== Finals ===
Semifinals
8	(France) **Fabrice Santoro**	**6**	**6**
4	(Croatia) Goran Ivanišević	1	4
3	(Czech Republic) **Petr Korda**	**6**	**6**
7	(Ukraine) Andrei Medvedev	3	4

Final
8	(France) Fabrice Santoro	0	3
3	(Czech Republic) **Petr Korda**	**6**	**6**

=== Section 1 ===
First round
1	(United Kingdom) **G Rusedski**	**6**	**6**
(Spain) J Viloca	4	4
WC	(Qatar) S Khalfan	2	1
WC	(Morocco) **K Alami**	**6**	**6**
Q	(Germany) **M Sinner**	**6**	**6**
LL	(Spain) O Burrieza	3	4
(Sweden) M Gustafsson	**7^{7}**	4	4
8	(France) **F Santoro**	6^{5}	**6**	**6**
4	(Croatia) **G Ivanišević**	**6**	**6**
(Morocco) H Arazi	2	3
(Switzerland) **M Rosset**	**6**	**7^{7}**
(Spain) J Alonso	2	6^{3}
(Sweden) T Nydahl	1	1
WC	(Germany) **B Karbacher**	**6**	**6**
Q	(Slovakia) J Krošlák	5	4
6	(Sweden) **M Larsson**	**7**	**6**

Second round
1	(United Kingdom) **G Rusedski**	**6**	**7**
WC	(Morocco) K Alami	2	5
Q	(Germany) M Sinner	3	4
8	(France) **F Santoro**	**6**	**6**
4	(Croatia) **G Ivanišević**	6^{4}	**7**	**7**
(Switzerland) M Rosset	**7^{7}**	5	5
WC	(Germany) **B Karbacher**	w/o
6	(Sweden) M Larsson

Quarterfinals
1	(United Kingdom) G Rusedski	2	**6**	3
8	(France) **F Santoro**	**6**	3	**6**
4	(Croatia) **G Ivanišević**	**7^{7}**	6^{5}	**6**
WC	(Germany) B Karbacher	6^{5}	**7^{7}**	3

Semifinals
8	(France) **F Santoro**	**6**	**6**
4	(Croatia) G Ivanišević	1	4

=== Section 2 ===
First round
5	(United Kingdom) **T Henman**	**7**	**6**
(Spain) J Sánchez	5	1
(France) **G Raoux**	**7^{7}**	**6**
(Czech Republic) B Ulihrach	6^{5}	4
(United States) R Reneberg	**6**	3	1
Q	(Germany) **L Burgsmüller**	4	**6**	**6**
Q	(France) O Delaître	5	1
3	(Czech Republic) **P Korda**	**7**	**6**
7	(Ukraine) **A Medvedev**	**6**	**6**
(Czech Republic) D Vacek	3	4
(Germany) M Goellner	3	4
(United States) **J Tarango**	**6**	**6**
(Netherlands) **S Schalken**	**6**	**6**
(Belgium) F Dewulf	0	4
(Spain) **C Costa**	**6**	**6**
2	(Spain) S Bruguera	4	2

Second round
5	(United Kingdom) **T Henman**	**7**	**6**
(France) G Raoux	5	4
Q	(Germany) L Burgsmüller	3	2
3	(Czech Republic) **P Korda**	**6**	**6**
7	(Ukraine) **A Medvedev**	**6**	2	**7**
(United States) J Tarango	2	**6**	5
(Netherlands) **S Schalken**	**7**	2	**7^{7}**
(Spain) C Costa	5	**6**	6^{5}

Quarterfinals
5	(United Kingdom) T Henman	5	**6**	4
3	(Czech Republic) **P Korda**	**7**	4	**6**
7	(Ukraine) **A Medvedev**	4	**6**	**6**
(Netherlands) S Schalken	**6**	4	4

Semifinals
3	(Czech Republic) **P Korda**	**6**	**6**
7	(Ukraine) A Medvedev	3	4
