= 1999 Qatar Open =

- Date: 4–11 January 1999
- Edition: 7th
- Category: World Series
- Draw: 32S/16D
- Prize money: $975,000
- Surface: Hard / outdoor
- Location: Doha, Qatar

Champions

Singles
- (Germany) Rainer Schüttler

Doubles
- (United States) Alex O'Brien / (United States) Jared Palmer
← 1998 ·	ATP Qatar Open	· 2000 →

The 1999 Qatar Open, known as the 1999 Qatar Mobil Open, for sponsorship reasons, was a men's tennis tournament held in Doha, Qatar and part of the World Series of the 1999 ATP Tour. It was the seventh edition of the tournament and was played on hard court and was held from 4 January through 11 January 1999. Unseeded Rainer Schüttler, who entered the draw as a qualifier, won the singles title.

== Finals ==
=== Singles ===
(Germany) Rainer Schüttler defeated (United Kingdom) Tim Henman, 6–4, 5–7, 6–1

- It was Schüttler's first singles title of the career.

=== Doubles ===
(United States) Alex O'Brien / (United States) Jared Palmer defeated (South Africa) Piet Norval / (Zimbabwe) Kevin Ullyett, 6–3, 6–4
