= 1997 Qatar Open – Singles =

Singles
- 1997 Qatar Open

Final
- Champion: (United States) Jim Courier
- Runner-up: (United Kingdom) Tim Henman
- Score: 7–5, 6–7^{(5–7)}, 6–2

Details
- Draw: 32
- Seeds: 8

Events
Singles	Doubles
← 1996 ·	ATP Qatar Open	· 1998 →

Petr Korda was the defending champion but lost in the quarterfinals to Sergi Bruguera.

Jim Courier won in the final 7–5, 6–7^{(5–7)}, 6–2 against Tim Henman.

== Seeds ==
1. (Austria) Thomas Muster (quarterfinals)
2. (Sweden) Thomas Enqvist (first round)
3. (Netherlands) Jan Siemerink (first round)
4. (Germany) Michael Stich (first round)
5. (Sweden) Magnus Gustafsson (quarterfinals)
6. (Czech Republic) Petr Korda (quarterfinals)
7. (Netherlands) Paul Haarhuis (first round)
8. (United States) Jim Courier (champion)

== Draw ==
=== Key ===
- Q = Qualifier
- WC = Wild card
- LL = Lucky loser
- Alt = Alternate
- SE = Special exempt
- PR = Protected ranking
- ITF = ITF entry
- JE = Junior exempt
- w/o = Walkover
- r = Retired
- d = Defaulted
- SR = Special ranking

=== Finals ===
Semifinals
8	(United States) Jim Courier	6	6
(Spain) Sergi Bruguera	4	2
(United Kingdom) Tim Henman	6	2	6
(Morocco) Hicham Arazi	3	6	2

Final
8	(United States) Jim Courier	7	6^{5}	6
(United Kingdom) Tim Henman	5	7^{7}	2

=== Top half ===
First round
1	(Austria) T Muster	7	6
(Argentina) H Gumy	5	4
(Norway) C Ruud	6	6
WC	(Qatar) S Khalfan	2	0
Q	(Romania) R Sabău	6	3	7^{7}
(Germany) O Gross	3	6	6^{1}
(Netherlands) S Schalken	6^{10}	5
8	(United States) J Courier	7^{12}	7
4	(Germany) M Stich	3	1
(Spain) S Bruguera	6	6
(Spain) J Sánchez	6	4	6
(France) G Raoux	3	6	4
(Spain) J A Viloca	3	0
(Sweden) M Norman	6	6
(France) S Simian	1	2
6	(Czech Republic) P Korda	6	6

Second round
1	(Austria) T Muster	6	3	7
(Norway) C Ruud	2	6	5
Q	(Romania) R Sabău	3	4
8	(United States) J Courier	6	6
(Spain) S Bruguera	6	6
(Spain) J Sánchez	0	1
(Sweden) M Norman	7^{7}	4	2
6	(Czech Republic) P Korda	6^{3}	6	6

Quarterfinals
1	(Austria) T Muster	3	5
8	(United States) J Courier	6	7
(Spain) S Bruguera	6	2	6
6	(Czech Republic) P Korda	1	6	3

Semifinals
8	(United States) J Courier	6	6
(Spain) S Bruguera	4	2

=== Bottom half ===
First round
5	(Sweden) M Gustafsson	4	6	6
(Spain) J Burillo	6	1	4
Q	(Romania) D Pescariu	7^{7}	5	2
(Slovakia) D Hrbatý	6^{4}	7	6
(United Kingdom) T Henman	6	6
Q	(Austria) H Wiltschnig	3	2
Q	(Egypt) T El-Sawy	6	6^{2}	7^{7}
3	(Netherlands) J Siemerink	3	7^{7}	6^{5}
7	(Netherlands) P Haarhuis	4	6	2
WC	(United States) P McEnroe	6	1	6
WC	(India) L Paes	2	3
(Morocco) H Arazi	6	6
(Sweden) P Fredriksson	6	6
(Morocco) K Alami	2	2
(Sweden) M Larsson	6	7
2	(Sweden) T Enqvist	4	5

Second round
5	(Sweden) M Gustafsson	6	2	6
(Slovakia) D Hrbatý	2	6	4
(United Kingdom) T Henman	6	6
Q	(Egypt) T El-Sawy	3	2
WC	(United States) P McEnroe	6	5	5
(Morocco) H Arazi	2	7	7
(Sweden) P Fredriksson	4	6^{4}
(Sweden) M Larsson	6	7^{7}

Quarterfinals
5	(Sweden) M Gustafsson	3	6^{3}
(United Kingdom) T Henman	6	7^{7}
(Morocco) H Arazi	7^{7}	7^{7}
(Sweden) M Larsson	6^{3}	6^{2}

Semifinals
(United Kingdom) T Henman	6	2	6
(Morocco) H Arazi	3	6	2
