= 1999 Qatar Open – Doubles =

Doubles
- 1999 Qatar Open

Final
- Champions: (United States) Alex O'Brien (United States) Jared Palmer
- Runners-up: (South Africa) Piet Norval (Zimbabwe) Kevin Ullyett
- Score: 6–3, 6–4

Details
- Draw: 16
- Seeds: 4

Events
Singles	Doubles
← 1998 ·	ATP Qatar Open	· 2000 →

Mahesh Bhupathi and Leander Paes were the defending champions, but lost in the first round this year.

Alex O'Brien and Jared Palmer won in the final 6–3, 6–4, against Piet Norval and Kevin Ullyett.

== Seeds ==
1. (India) Mahesh Bhupathi / (India) Leander Paes (first round)
2. (France) Olivier Delaître / (France) Fabrice Santoro (semifinals, withdrew)
3. (Czech Republic) Martin Damm / (Czech Republic) Cyril Suk (quarterfinals)
4. (Russia) Yevgeny Kafelnikov / (Czech Republic) Daniel Vacek (quarterfinals)

== Draw ==
=== Key ===
- Q = Qualifier
- WC = Wild card
- LL = Lucky loser
- Alt = Alternate
- SE = Special exempt
- PR = Protected ranking
- ITF = ITF entry
- JE = Junior exempt
- w/o = Walkover
- r = Retired
- d = Defaulted
- SR = Special ranking

=== Draw ===
First round
1	(India) M Bhupathi (India) L Paes	3	4
Q	(United States) B Coupe (The Bahamas) M Merklein	6	6
(Netherlands) T Kempers (Sweden) P Nyborg	7	6	6
(South Africa) C Haggard (South Africa) R Koenig	6	7	7
3	(Czech Republic) M Damm (Czech Republic) C Suk	6	7
(Spain) F Roig (Spain) J Sánchez	3	6
(United States) A O'Brien (United States) J Palmer	6	6
WC	(Sweden) T Johansson (Czech Republic) P Korda	1	2
(North Macedonia) A Kitinov (United States) J Tarango	2	7	5
(South Africa) P Norval (Zimbabwe) K Ullyett	6	5	7
WC	(United Kingdom) T Henman (United Kingdom) A Richardson	4	6
4	(Russia) Y Kafelnikov (Czech Republic) D Vacek	6	7
WC	(Morocco) K Alami (Morocco) H Arazi	3	6	6
(South Africa) M Barnard (Russia) A Olhovskiy	6	3	4
(Netherlands) M Oosting (Czech Republic) P Vízner	4	2
2	(France) O Delaître (France) F Santoro	6	6

Quarterfinals
Q	(United States) B Coupe (The Bahamas) M Merklein	6	4
(South Africa) C Haggard (South Africa) R Koenig	7	6
3	(Czech Republic) M Damm (Czech Republic) C Suk	2	5
(United States) A O'Brien (United States) J Palmer	6	7
(South Africa) P Norval (Zimbabwe) K Ullyett	6	7	6
4	(Russia) Y Kafelnikov (Czech Republic) D Vacek	7	5	4
WC	(Morocco) K Alami (Morocco) H Arazi	2	6
2	(France) O Delaître (France) F Santoro	6	7

Semifinals
(South Africa) C Haggard (South Africa) R Koenig	6	4
(United States) A O'Brien (United States) J Palmer	7	6
(South Africa) P Norval (Zimbabwe) K Ullyett	w/o
2	(France) O Delaître (France) F Santoro

Final
(United States) A O'Brien (United States) J Palmer	6	6
(South Africa) P Norval (Zimbabwe) K Ullyett	3	4
