= 1997 Qatar Open – Doubles =

Doubles
- 1997 Qatar Open

Final
- Champions: (Netherlands) Jacco Eltingh (Netherlands) Paul Haarhuis
- Runners-up: (Sweden) Patrik Fredriksson (Sweden) Magnus Norman
- Score: 6–3, 6–2

Details
- Draw: 16
- Seeds: 4

Events
Singles	Doubles
← 1996 ·	ATP Qatar Open	· 1998 →

Mark Knowles and Daniel Nestor were the defending champions but did not compete that year.

Jacco Eltingh and Paul Haarhuis won in the final 6–3, 6–2 against Patrik Fredriksson and Magnus Norman.

== Seeds ==
1. (Netherlands) Jacco Eltingh / (Netherlands) Paul Haarhuis (champions)
2. (Sweden) Peter Nyborg / (Belgium) Libor Pimek (first round)
3. (France) Guillaume Raoux / (Spain) Javier Sánchez (first round)
4. (Netherlands) Hendrik Jan Davids / (Netherlands) Sjeng Schalken (quarterfinals)

== Draw ==
=== Key ===
- Q = Qualifier
- WC = Wild card
- LL = Lucky loser
- Alt = Alternate
- SE = Special exempt
- PR = Protected ranking
- ITF = ITF entry
- JE = Junior exempt
- w/o = Walkover
- r = Retired
- d = Defaulted
- SR = Special ranking

First round
1	(Netherlands) J Eltingh (Netherlands) P Haarhuis	6	6
(Egypt) T El-Sawy (France) S Simian	4	4
(United Kingdom) T Henman (Netherlands) J Siemerink	6	6
WC	(Sweden) T Enqvist (Sweden) M Larsson	4	3
3	(France) G Raoux (Spain) J Sánchez	6	6	4
(Germany) K Braasch (Netherlands) S Groen	3	7	6
(United States) D Johnson (India) L Paes	3	7	1
(Czech Republic) P Korda (United States) P McEnroe	6	6	6
Q	(Sweden) P Fredriksson (Sweden) M Norman	6	4	7
WC	(United States) J Courier (Germany) M Stich	4	6	5
(South Africa) M Barnard (United Kingdom) A Richardson	6	5	2
4	(Netherlands) H J Davids (Netherlands) S Schalken	3	7	6
WC	(Morocco) K Alami (Morocco) H Arazi	6	6
(Netherlands) S Noteboom (Netherlands) F Wibier	3	4
(United States) L Jensen (United States) M Jensen	2	7	6
2	(Sweden) P Nyborg (Belgium) L Pimek	6	5	4

Quarterfinals
1	(Netherlands) J Eltingh (Netherlands) P Haarhuis	6	6
(United Kingdom) T Henman (Netherlands) J Siemerink	4	4
(Germany) K Braasch (Netherlands) S Groen	1	6	7
(Czech Republic) P Korda (United States) P McEnroe	6	3	6
Q	(Sweden) P Fredriksson (Sweden) M Norman	6	6
4	(Netherlands) H J Davids (Netherlands) S Schalken	3	4
WC	(Morocco) K Alami (Morocco) H Arazi	1	2
(United States) L Jensen (United States) M Jensen	6	6

Semifinals
1	(Netherlands) J Eltingh (Netherlands) P Haarhuis	6	6
(Germany) K Braasch (Netherlands) S Groen	3	4
Q	(Sweden) P Fredriksson (Sweden) M Norman	6	7
(United States) L Jensen (United States) M Jensen	2	6

Final
1	(Netherlands) J Eltingh (Netherlands) P Haarhuis	6	6
Q	(Sweden) P Fredriksson (Sweden) M Norman	3	2
