= 1996 Pilot Pen International – Singles =

Singles
- 1996 Pilot Pen International

Final
- Champion: (United States) Alex O'Brien
- Runner-up: (Netherlands) Jan Siemerink
- Score: 7–6^{(8–6)}, 6–4

Details
- Draw: 56
- Seeds: 16

Events
Singles	Doubles
← 1995 ·	Pilot Pen International	· 1997 →

Andre Agassi was the defending champion but did not compete that year.

Alex O'Brien won in the final 7–6^{(8–6)}, 6–4 against Jan Siemerink.

== Seeds ==
A champion seed is indicated in bold text while text in italics indicates the round in which that seed was eliminated. The top eight seeds received a bye to the second round.

1. (Russia) Yevgeny Kafelnikov (quarterfinals)
2. (Netherlands) Richard Krajicek (quarterfinals)
3. (United States) Jim Courier (third round)
4. (South Africa) Wayne Ferreira (semifinals)
5. (Chile) Marcelo Ríos (third round)
6. (Switzerland) Marc Rosset (quarterfinals)
7. (France) Cédric Pioline (second round)
8. (France) Arnaud Boetsch (second round)
9. (Netherlands) Paul Haarhuis (first round)
10. (Netherlands) Jan Siemerink (final)
11. (Zimbabwe) Byron Black (second round)
12. (Czech Republic) Daniel Vacek (quarterfinals)
13. (Ukraine) Andriy Medvedev (second round)
14. (Australia) Mark Philippoussis (semifinals)
15. (Italy) Andrea Gaudenzi (third round)
16. (Morocco) Younes El Aynaoui (first round)

== Draw ==
=== Key ===
- Q = Qualifier
- WC = Wild card
- LL = Lucky loser
- Alt = Alternate
- ITF = ITF entry
- PR = Protected ranking
- SR = Special ranking
- SE = Special exempt
- JE = Junior exempt
- JR = Junior Accelerator Programme entrant
- CO = College Accelerator Programme entrant
- NG = Next Gen Accelerator Program entrant
- w/o = Walkover
- r = Retired
- d = Defaulted

=== Finals ===
Semifinals
WC	(United States) **Alex O'Brien**	**7^{7}**	6^{4}	**6**
14	(Australia) Mark Philippoussis	6^{4}	**7^{7}**	4
4	(South Africa) Wayne Ferreira	3	**6**	3
10	(Netherlands) **Jan Siemerink**	**6**	3	**6**

Final
WC	(United States) **Alex O'Brien**	**7^{8}**	**6**
10	(Netherlands) Jan Siemerink	6^{6}	4

=== Top half ===
==== Section 1 ====
First round
Q	(United States) G Grant	4	2
(Russia) **A Olhovskiy**	**6**	**6**
(Slovakia) **J Krošlák**	**6**	**6**
Q	(France) L Barthez	4	4
(Slovakia) K Kučera	2	6^{3}
15	(Italy) **A Gaudenzi**	**6**	**7^{7}**
9	(Netherlands) P Haarhuis	**6**	4	4
(Japan) **S Matsuoka**	3	**6**	**6**
(United States) **C Adams**	**6**	**6**
(United States) S Campbell	4	2
WC	(United States) **A O'Brien**	**6**	3	**6**
(Armenia) S Sargsian	2	**6**	4

Second round
1	(Russia) **Y Kafelnikov**	6^{0}	**6**	**6**
(Russia) A Olhovskiy	**7^{7}**	3	3
(Slovakia) J Krošlák	3	6^{5}
15	(Italy) **A Gaudenzi**	**6**	**7^{7}**
(Japan) S Matsuoka	3	4
(United States) **C Adams**	**6**	**6**
WC	(United States) **A O'Brien**	**6**	**6**
8	(France) A Boetsch	2	1

Third round
1	(Russia) **Y Kafelnikov**	**6**	**6**
15	(Italy) A Gaudenzi	1	4
(United States) C Adams	3	**6**	2
WC	(United States) **A O'Brien**	**6**	2	**6**

Quarterfinals
1	(Russia) Y Kafelnikov	4	4
WC	(United States) **A O'Brien**	**6**	**6**

==== Section 2 ====
First round
(Netherlands) S Schalken	3	1
(Sweden) **M Tillström**	**6**	**6**
(Sweden) **J Björkman**	**6**	**6**
(Sweden) N Kulti	3	2
(Denmark) K Carlsen	**6**	6^{3}	4
14	(Australia) **M Philippoussis**	4	**7^{7}**	**6**
11	(Zimbabwe) **B Black**	**7^{7}**	**6**
WC	(Australia) P Cash	6^{5}	4
Q	(Venezuela) J Szymanski	6^{7}	**7**	0
Q	(Germany) **L Burgsmüller**	**7^{9}**	5	**6**
(Sweden) M Larsson	5	4
(United Kingdom) **G Rusedski**	**7**	**6**

Second round
3	(United States) **J Courier**	**7^{7}**	**6**
(Sweden) M Tillström	6^{5}	3
(Sweden) J Björkman	4	3
14	(Australia) **M Philippoussis**	**6**	**6**
11	(Zimbabwe) B Black	4	5
Q	(Germany) **L Burgsmüller**	**6**	**7**
(United Kingdom) G Rusedski	**7^{7}**	6^{4}	5
6	(Switzerland) **M Rosset**	6^{2}	**7^{7}**	**7**

Third round
3	(United States) J Courier	6^{5}	6^{3}
14	(Australia) **M Philippoussis**	**7^{7}**	**7^{7}**
Q	(Germany) L Burgsmüller	5	6^{3}
6	(Switzerland) **M Rosset**	**7**	**7^{7}**

Quarterfinals
14	(Australia) **M Philippoussis**	**6**	**6**
6	(Switzerland) M Rosset	2	3

=== Bottom half ===
==== Section 3 ====
First round
Q	(The Bahamas) R Smith	3	4
(India) **L Paes**	**6**	**6**
Q	(Switzerland) L Manta	**7^{7}**	2	6^{3}
(Russia) **A Cherkasov**	6^{3}	**6**	**7^{7}**
(United States) V Spadea	6^{5}	3
12	(Czech Republic) **D Vacek**	**7^{7}**	**6**
13	(Ukraine) **A Medvedev**	**6**	**6**
(France) S Simian	1	4
WC	(United States) C Mamiit	**6**	6^{8}	2
(Russia) **A Chesnokov**	1	**7^{10}**	**6**
(United States) **M Joyce**	1	**6**	**7^{9}**
Q	(South Africa) P Norval	**6**	4	6^{7}

Second round
5	(Chile) **M Ríos**	**6**	**6**
(India) L Paes	0	2
(Russia) A Cherkasov	4	4
12	(Czech Republic) **D Vacek**	**6**	**6**
13	(Ukraine) A Medvedev	**6**	6^{5}	4
(Russia) **A Chesnokov**	3	**7^{7}**	**6**
(United States) M Joyce	2	**6**	4
4	(South Africa) **W Ferreira**	**6**	3	**6**

Third round
5	(Chile) M Ríos	1	1
12	(Czech Republic) **D Vacek**	**6**	**6**
(Russia) A Chesnokov	2	0
4	(South Africa) **W Ferreira**	**6**	**6**

Quarterfinals
12	(Czech Republic) D Vacek	2	**7^{8}**	3
4	(South Africa) **W Ferreira**	**6**	6^{6}	**6**

==== Section 4 ====
First round
(Netherlands) J Eltingh	3	1
(Spain) **S Bruguera**	**6**	**6**
(Venezuela) N Pereira	**6**	4	5
(Australia) **S Stolle**	4	**6**	**7**
WC	(United States) L Gloria	1	2
10	(Netherlands) **J Siemerink**	**6**	**6**
16	(Morocco) Y El Aynaoui	3	4
(Germany) **M-K Goellner**	**6**	**6**
(Sweden) M Wilander	3	4
(Australia) **P Rafter**	**6**	**6**
(Italy) L Tieleman	**6**	5	4
WC	(United States) **L Jensen**	2	**7**	**6**

Second round
7	(France) C Pioline	**6**	3	4
(Spain) **S Bruguera**	2	**6**	**6**
(Australia) S Stolle	5	2
10	(Netherlands) **J Siemerink**	**7**	**6**
(Germany) M-K Goellner	3	2
(Australia) **P Rafter**	**6**	**6**
WC	(United States) L Jensen	3	**7^{7}**	6^{2}
2	(Netherlands) **R Krajicek**	**6**	6^{5}	**7^{7}**

Third round
(Spain) S Bruguera	4	3
10	(Netherlands) **J Siemerink**	**6**	**6**
(Australia) P Rafter	4	**7**	5
2	(Netherlands) **R Krajicek**	**6**	5	**7**

Quarterfinals
10	(Netherlands) **J Siemerink**	**7^{7}**	**6**
2	(Netherlands) R Krajicek	6^{3}	4
