= 1998 Qatar Open – Doubles =

Doubles
- 1998 Qatar Open

Final
- Champions: (India) Mahesh Bhupathi (India) Leander Paes
- Runners-up: (France) Olivier Delaître (France) Fabrice Santoro
- Score: 6–4, 3–6, 6–4

Details
- Draw: 16
- Seeds: 4

Events
Singles	Doubles
← 1997 ·	ATP Qatar Open	· 1999 →

Jacco Eltingh and Paul Haarhuis were the defending champions, but did not participate together this year. Eltingh partnered Sjeng Schalken, losing in the quarterfinals. Haarhuis did not participate this year.

Mahesh Bhupathi and Leander Paes won in the final 6–4, 3–6, 6–4, against Olivier Delaître and Fabrice Santoro.

== Seeds ==
Champion seeds are indicated in bold text while text in italics indicates the round in which those seeds were eliminated.

1. (India) **Mahesh Bhupathi** / (India) **Leander Paes (champions)**
2. (France) Olivier Delaître / (France) Fabrice Santoro (final)
3. Unknown (withdrew)
4. (Czech Republic) Pavel Vízner / (Netherlands) Fernon Wibier (quarterfinals)

== Draw ==
=== Key ===
- Q = Qualifier
- WC = Wild card
- LL = Lucky loser
- Alt = Alternate
- SE = Special exempt
- PR = Protected ranking
- ITF = ITF entry
- JE = Junior exempt
- w/o = Walkover
- r = Retired
- d = Defaulted
- SR = Special ranking

=== Finals ===
First round
1	**(India) M Bhupathi** **(India) L Paes**	**6**	6	**6**
WC	(Morocco) K Alami (Morocco) H Arazi	3	**7**	4
WC	**(Netherlands) J Eltingh** **(Netherlands) S Schalken**	**6**	4	**6**
Q	(South Africa) M Barnard (United Kingdom) C Wilkinson	3	**6**	3
LL	(United States) B Behrens (Russia) A Cherkasov	3	2
**(Germany) M-K Goellner** **(United States) R Reneberg**	**6**	**6**
**(Netherlands) S Groen** **(Croatia) G Ivanišević**	**6**	**7**
(Netherlands) T Kempers (Netherlands) M Oosting	4	6
WC	**(United Kingdom) T Henman** **(Switzerland) M Rosset**	**6**	**6**
(France) G Raoux (Spain) J Sánchez	4	3
(Belarus) M Mirnyi (United States) J Tarango	**6**	6	6
4	**(Czech Republic) P Vízner** **(Netherlands) F Wibier**	3	**7**	**7**
(Netherlands) HJ Davids (Belgium) L Pimek	**6**	6	6
**(Netherlands) S Noteboom** **(Belgium) T Vanhoudt**	2	**7**	**7**
(Italy) C Brandi (Italy) F Messori	2	**6**	3
2	**(France) O Delaître** **(France) F Santoro**	**6**	2	**6**

Quarterfinals
1	**(India) M Bhupathi** **(India) L Paes**	**6**	**6**
WC	(Netherlands) J Eltingh (Netherlands) S Schalken	4	2
**(Germany) M-K Goellner** **(United States) R Reneberg**	5	**7**	**6**
(Netherlands) S Groen (Croatia) G Ivanišević	**7**	6	4
WC	**(United Kingdom) T Henman** **(Switzerland) M Rosset**	**6**	**6**
4	(Czech Republic) P Vízner (Netherlands) F Wibier	3	2
(Netherlands) S Noteboom (Belgium) T Vanhoudt	4	4
2	**(France) O Delaître** **(France) F Santoro**	**6**	**6**

Semifinals
1	**(India) M Bhupathi** **(India) L Paes**	**7**	6	**7**
(Germany) M-K Goellner (United States) R Reneberg	6	**7**	6
WC	(United Kingdom) T Henman (Switzerland) M Rosset	3	3
2	**(France) O Delaître** **(France) F Santoro**	**6**	**6**

Final
1	**(India) M Bhupathi** **(India) L Paes**	**6**	3	**6**
2	(France) O Delaître (France) F Santoro	4	**6**	4
