= 1996 Pilot Pen International – Doubles =

Doubles
- 1996 Pilot Pen International
- 1995 Champions: (United States) Rick Leach (United States) Scott Melville

Final
- Champions: (Zimbabwe) Byron Black (Canada) Grant Connell
- Runners-up: (Sweden) Jonas Björkman (Sweden) Nicklas Kulti
- Score: 6–4, 6–4

Details
- Draw: 28
- Seeds: 8

Events
Singles	Doubles
← 1995 ·	Pilot Pen International	· 1997 →

Rick Leach and Scott Melville were the defending champions but did not compete that year.

Byron Black and Grant Connell won in the final 6–4, 6–4 against Jonas Björkman and Nicklas Kulti.

== Seeds ==
Champion seeds are indicated in bold text while text in italics indicates the round in which those seeds were eliminated. The top four seeded teams received byes into the second round.

1. (Zimbabwe) **Byron Black** / (Canada) **Grant Connell (champions)**
2. (Russia) Yevgeny Kafelnikov / (Czech Republic) Daniel Vacek (quarterfinals)
3. (United States) Patrick Galbraith / (Russia) Andrei Olhovskiy (second round)
4. (Netherlands) Jacco Eltingh / (Netherlands) Paul Haarhuis (second round)
5. (South Africa) Ellis Ferreira / (Netherlands) Jan Siemerink (semifinals)
6. (Sweden) Jonas Björkman / (Sweden) Nicklas Kulti (final)
7. (Australia) Mark Philippoussis / (Australia) Patrick Rafter (first round)
8. (United Kingdom) Neil Broad / (South Africa) Piet Norval (semifinals)

== Draw ==
=== Key ===
- Q = Qualifier
- WC = Wild card
- LL = Lucky loser
- Alt = Alternate
- SE = Special exempt
- PR = Protected ranking
- ITF = ITF entry
- JE = Junior exempt
- w/o = Walkover
- r = Retired
- d = Defaulted
- SR = Special ranking

=== Final ===
Final

1
- (Zimbabwe) **Byron Black**
- (Canada) **Grant Connell**
**6**
**6**

6
- (Sweden) Jonas Björkman
- (Sweden) Nicklas Kulti
4
4

=== Top half ===
First round

Second round

Quarterfinals

Semifinals

1
- (Zimbabwe) **B Black**
- (Canada) **G Connell**
6
**6**
**6**

- (United States) **S Cannon**
- (The Bahamas) **R Smith**
**6**
**6**

- (United States) S Cannon
- (The Bahamas) R Smith
**7**
4
4

WC
- (France) A Boetsch
- (Switzerland) M Rosset
4
4

1
- (Zimbabwe) **B Black**
- (Canada) **G Connell**
**7**
**6**

- (United Kingdom) **A Richardson**
- (Italy) **L Tieleman**
**6**
**6**

- (South Africa) D Adams
- (Netherlands) S Schalken
6
4

WC
- (Spain) S Bruguera
- (Ukraine) A Medvedev
4
1

- (United Kingdom) A Richardson
- (Italy) L Tieleman
6
**6**
4

- (South Africa) **D Adams**
- (Netherlands) **S Schalken**
6
**6**
**6**

- (South Africa) **D Adams**
- (Netherlands) **S Schalken**
**7**
4
**6**

7
- (Australia) M Philippoussis
- (Australia) P Rafter
**7**
3
4

1
- (Zimbabwe) **B Black**
- (Canada) **G Connell**
6
**6**
**6**

5
- (South Africa) E Ferreira
- (Netherlands) J Siemerink
**7**
4
3

4
- (Netherlands) J Eltingh
- (Netherlands) P Haarhuis
4
5

- (India) **M Bhupathi**
- (India) **L Paes**
**6**
**7**

- (India) **M Bhupathi**
- (India) **L Paes**
**6**
**7**

- (Netherlands) S Noteboom
- (Netherlands) F Wibier
3
6

- (India) M Bhupathi
- (India) L Paes
3
4

- (South Africa) M Barnard
- (United States) G Van Emburgh
**6**
2
3

5
- (South Africa) **E Ferreira**
- (Netherlands) **J Siemerink**
**6**
**6**

- (United States) **B Hansen-Dent**
- (United States) **T. J. Middleton**
4
**6**
**6**

- (United States) B Hansen-Dent
- (United States) T. J. Middleton
**7**
4
3

- (France) O Delaître
- (United States) V Spadea
1
0

5
- (South Africa) **E Ferreira**
- (Netherlands) **J Siemerink**
6
**6**
**6**

5
- (South Africa) **E Ferreira**
- (Netherlands) **J Siemerink**
**6**
**6**

=== Bottom half ===
First round

Second round

Quarterfinals

Semifinals

6
- (Sweden) **J Björkman**
- (Sweden) **N Kulti**
**6**
**7**

Q
- (Venezuela) N Pereira
- (Sweden) M Wilander
3
5

6
- (Sweden) **J Björkman**
- (Sweden) **N Kulti**
**6**
**6**

- (United States) L Jensen
- (United States) M Jensen
**7**
6
4

- (United States) J Courier
- (United States) A O'Brien
4
3

- (United States) **J Courier**
- (United States) **A O'Brien**
6
**7**
**6**

6
- (Sweden) **J Björkman**
- (Sweden) **N Kulti**
**6**
**6**

- (Australia) **P Cash**
- (Australia) **S Stolle**
**6**
**6**

- (Australia) P Cash
- (Australia) S Stolle
4
2

- (Sweden) O Kristiansson
- (Sweden) M Renström
3
0

- (Australia) **P Cash**
- (Australia) **S Stolle**
**6**
**6**

3
- (United States) P Galbraith
- (Russia) A Olhovskiy
3
4

6
- (Sweden) **J Björkman**
- (Sweden) **N Kulti**
6
**6**
**6**

8
- (United Kingdom) **N Broad**
- (South Africa) **P Norval**
**6**
4
**6**

8
- (United Kingdom) N Broad
- (South Africa) P Norval
**7**
4
3

- (Portugal) E Couto
- (Portugal) B Mota
0
**6**
2

8
- (United Kingdom) **N Broad**
- (South Africa) **P Norval**
**7**
**7**

WC
- (Italy) **A Gaudenzi**
- (Austria) **T Muster**
**7**
**6**

WC
- (Italy) A Gaudenzi
- (Austria) T Muster
5
6

Q
- (South Africa) R Koenig
- (Belarus) M Mirnyi
6
1

8
- (United Kingdom) **N Broad**
- (South Africa) **P Norval**
**6**
6
**6**

- (Zimbabwe) W Black
- (South Africa) K Ullyett
**6**
6
1

2
- (Russia) Y Kafelnikov
- (Czech Republic) D Vacek
4
**7**
3

WC
- (United States) **M Joyce**
- (Chile) **M Ríos**
3
**7**
**6**

WC
- (United States) M Joyce
- (Chile) M Ríos
3
5

2
- (Russia) **Y Kafelnikov**
- (Czech Republic) **D Vacek**
**6**
**7**
