= 2001 Qatar Open – Doubles =

Doubles
- 2001 Qatar Open

Final
- Champions: (The Bahamas) Mark Knowles (Canada) Daniel Nestor
- Runners-up: (Spain) Juan Balcells (Russia) Andrei Olhovskiy
- Score: 6–3, 6–1

Details
- Draw: 16
- Seeds: 4

Events
| Singles | Doubles |
- ATP Qatar Open

Mark Knowles and Max Mirnyi were the defending champions but they competed with different partners that year, Knowles with Daniel Nestor and Mirnyi with Yevgeny Kafelnikov.

Kafelnikov and Mirnyi lost in the quarterfinals to Juan Balcells and Andrei Olhovskiy.

Knowles and Nestor won in the final 6–3, 6–1 against Balcells and Olhovskiy.

== Seeds ==
1. (Russia) Yevgeny Kafelnikov / (Belarus) Max Mirnyi (quarterfinals)
2. (The Bahamas) Mark Knowles / (Canada) Daniel Nestor (champions)
3. (Germany) David Prinosil / (Federal Republic of Yugoslavia) Nenad Zimonjić (quarterfinals)
4. (Sweden) Simon Aspelin / (Czech Republic) Cyril Suk (quarterfinals)

== Draw ==
Key

- Q = Qualifier
- WC = Wild card
- LL = Lucky loser
- Alt = Alternate
- ITF = ITF entry
- PR = Protected ranking
- SR = Special ranking
- SE = Special exempt
- JE = Junior exempt
- JR = Junior Accelerator Programme entrant
- CO = College Accelerator Programme entrant
- NG = Next Gen Accelerator Program entrant
- w/o = Walkover
- r = Retired
- d = Defaulted

First round
1 | (Russia) Y Kafelnikov (Belarus) M Mirnyi | 7 | 7
(Germany) L Burgsmüller (Netherlands) S Groen | 5 | 5
(Spain) J Balcells (Russia) A Olhovskiy | 7 | 6
(Czech Republic) P Pála (Czech Republic) P Vízner | 5 | 2
4 | (Sweden) S Aspelin (Czech Republic) C Suk | 6 | 6
(Croatia) G Ivanišević (Germany) R Schüttler | 1 | 3
(Spain) Á Calatrava (Spain) A Portas | 6 | 6
WC | (Qatar) N Al-Khulafi (Qatar) S Khalfan | 0 | 4
(Morocco) K Alami (Morocco) H Arazi | 4 | 6^{5}
(Switzerland) I Heuberger (Germany) A Waske | 6 | 7^{7}
(Germany) N Kiefer (Netherlands) S Schalken | 2 | 2
3 | (Germany) D Prinosil (Federal Republic of Yugoslavia) N Zimonjić | 6 | 6
(France) J Boutter (France) F Santoro | 7^{7} | 6
(France) N Escudé (Switzerland) M Rosset | 6^{3} | 1
Q | (France) J-F Bachelot (Belgium) D Norman | 2 | 6^{4}
2 | (The Bahamas) M Knowles (Canada) D Nestor | 6 | 7^{7}

Quarterfinals
1 | (Russia) Y Kafelnikov (Belarus) M Mirnyi | 4 | 6 | 3
(Spain) J Balcells (Russia) A Olhovskiy | 6 | 1 | 6
4 | (Sweden) S Aspelin (Czech Republic) C Suk | 2 | 1^{r}
(Spain) Á Calatrava (Spain) A Portas | 6 | 2
(Switzerland) I Heuberger (Germany) A Waske | 6 | 7^{7}
3 | (Germany) D Prinosil (Federal Republic of Yugoslavia) N Zimonjić | 2 | 6^{4}
(France) J Boutter (France) F Santoro | 6^{4} | 4
2 | (The Bahamas) M Knowles (Canada) D Nestor | 7^{7} | 6

Semifinals
(Spain) J Balcells (Russia) A Olhovskiy | 6 | 7^{7}
(Spain) Á Calatrava (Spain) A Portas | 3 | 6^{3}
(Switzerland) I Heuberger (Germany) A Waske | 3 | 4
2 | (The Bahamas) M Knowles (Canada) D Nestor | 6 | 6

Final
(Spain) J Balcells (Russia) A Olhovskiy | 3 | 1
2 | (The Bahamas) M Knowles (Canada) D Nestor | 6 | 6

== Qualifying ==
=== Seeds ===
1. (France) Nicolas Coutelot / (Germany) Andy Fahlke (first round)
2. (Russia) Igor Kunitcin / (Italy) Uros Vico (first round)

=== Qualifiers ===
1. (France) Jean-François Bachelot / (Belgium) Dick Norman

==== Draw ====
First round
1 | (France) Nicolas Coutelot (Germany) Andy Fahlke | 3 | 4
(Russia) Kirill Ivanov-Smolensky (Austria) Alexander Peya | 6 | 6
Alt | (France) Jean-François Bachelot (Belgium) Dick Norman | 7^{7} | 6
2 | (Russia) Igor Kunitcin (Italy) Uros Vico | 6^{1} | 3

Final Round
(Russia) Kirill Ivanov-Smolensky (Austria) Alexander Peya | 6 | 3 | 4
Alt | (France) Jean-François Bachelot (Belgium) Dick Norman | 4 | 6 | 6
