= 1997 Qatar Open =

- Date: 30 December 1996 – 6 January 1997
- Edition: 5th
- Category: World Series
- Draw: 32S / 16D
- Prize money: $600,000
- Surface: Hard / outdoor
- Location: Doha, Qatar

Champions

Singles
- (United States) Jim Courier

Doubles
- (Netherlands) Jacco Eltingh / (Netherlands) Paul Haarhuis
- ATP Qatar Open

The 1997 Qatar Open, known as the 1997 Qatar Mobil Open for sponsorship reasons, was a men's tennis tournament played on outdoor hard courts at the Khalifa International Tennis Complex in Doha in Qatar and was part of the World Series of the 1997 ATP Tour. It was the fifth edition of the tournament and was held from 30 December 1996 until 6 January 1997. Eighth-seeded Jim Courier won the singles title.

== Finals ==
=== Singles ===
(United States) Jim Courier defeated (United Kingdom) Tim Henman 7–5, 6–7^{(5–7)}, 6–2

- It was Courier's 1st title of the year and the 25th of his career.

=== Doubles ===
(Netherlands) Jacco Eltingh / (Netherlands) Paul Haarhuis defeated (Sweden) Patrik Fredriksson / (Sweden) Magnus Norman 6–3, 6–2

- It was Eltingh's 1st title of the year and the 33rd of his career. It was Haarhuis's 1st title of the year and the 32nd of his career.
