= 1998 Pilot Pen International – Women's doubles =

Women's doubles
- 1998 Pilot Pen International

Final
- Champions: (France) Alexandra Fusai (France) Nathalie Tauziat
- Runners-up: (South Africa) Mariaan de Swardt (Czech Republic) Jana Novotná
- Score: 6–1, 6–0

Details
- Draw: 16
- Seeds: 4

Events
Singles	men	women
Doubles	men	women
- Pilot Pen International

Nicole Arendt and Manon Bollegraf were the reigning champions but did not compete that year.

Alexandra Fusai and Nathalie Tauziat won in the final 6–1, 6–0 against Mariaan de Swardt and Jana Novotná.

== Seeds ==
Champion seeds are indicated in bold text while text in italics indicates the round in which those seeds were eliminated.

1. (France) **Alexandra Fusai** / (France) **Nathalie Tauziat (champions)**
2. (South Africa) Mariaan de Swardt / (Czech Republic) Jana Novotná (final)
3. (Russia) Anna Kournikova / (Latvia) Larisa Neiland (quarterfinals)
4. (Indonesia) Yayuk Basuki / (Netherlands) Caroline Vis (quarterfinals)

== Draw ==
Key

- Q = Qualifier
- WC = Wild card
- LL = Lucky loser
- Alt = Alternate
- ITF = ITF entry
- PR = Protected ranking
- SR = Special ranking
- SE = Special exempt
- JE = Junior exempt
- JR = Junior Accelerator Programme entrant
- CO = College Accelerator Programme entrant
- NG = Next Gen Accelerator Program entrant
- w/o = Walkover
- r = Retired
- d = Defaulted

First round
1	(France) **A Fusai** (France) **N Tauziat**	**6**	6	**6**
(United States) K Adams (Argentina) P Tarabini	0	**7**	3
(France) **J Halard-Decugis** (Australia) **R McQuillan**	**6**	**7**
(Austria) B Schett (Switzerland) P Schnyder	3	6
4	(Indonesia) **Y Basuki** (Netherlands) **C Vis**	**7**	**6**
(Japan) N Miyagi (Australia) N Pratt	5	1
(Argentina) **F Labat** (Belgium) **D Van Roost**	**6**	4	**6**
(Argentina) I Gorrochategui (United States) D Graham	4	**6**	2
(Romania) C Cristea (Australia) K-A Guse	3	4
(Germany) **M Babel** (United States) **C Rubin**	**6**	**6**
Q	(Italy) S Farina (Slovakia) K Habšudová	2	5
3	(Russia) **A Kournikova** (Latvia) **L Neiland**	**6**	**7**
(United States) M J Fernández (Spain) A Sánchez Vicario	**6**	2	3
(Russia) **E Likhovtseva** (Ukraine) **E Tatarkova**	4	**6**	**6**
(Netherlands) K Boogert (Netherlands) M Oremans	1	2
2	(South Africa) **M de Swardt** (Czech Republic) **J Novotná**	**6**	**6**

Quarterfinals
1	(France) **A Fusai** (France) **N Tauziat**	**6**	**6**
(France) J Halard-Decugis (Australia) R McQuillan	3	2
4	(Indonesia) Y Basuki (Netherlands) C Vis	2	4
(Argentina) **F Labat** (Belgium) **D Van Roost**	**6**	**6**
(Germany) **M Babel** (United States) **C Rubin**	**6**	4	**7**
3	(Russia) A Kournikova (Latvia) L Neiland	2	**6**	6
(Russia) E Likhovtseva (Ukraine) E Tatarkova	**6**	5	2
2	(South Africa) **M de Swardt** (Czech Republic) **J Novotná**	3	**7**	**6**

Semifinals
1	(France) **A Fusai** (France) **N Tauziat**	3	**6**	**7**
(Argentina) F Labat (Belgium) D Van Roost	**6**	3	6
(Germany) M Babel (United States) C Rubin	**6**	2	2
2	(South Africa) **M de Swardt** (Czech Republic) **J Novotná**	4	**6**	**6**

Final
1	(France) **Alexandra Fusai** (France) **Nathalie Tauziat**	**6**	**6**
2	(South Africa) Mariaan de Swardt (Czech Republic) Jana Novotná	1	0
