= 2001 Qatar Open =

2001 Qatar ExxonMobil Open
- Date: 1–7 January 2001
- Edition: 9th
- Category: International Series
- Draw: 32S / 16D
- Prize money: $975,000
- Surface: Hard court / outdoor
- Location: Doha, Qatar
- Venue: Khalifa International Tennis Complex

Champions

Singles
- (Chile) Marcelo Ríos

Doubles
- (The Bahamas) Mark Knowles / (Canada) Daniel Nestor
- ATP Qatar Open

The 2001 Qatar Open, known as the 2001 Qatar ExxonMobil Open for sponsorship reasons, was a men's tennis tournament played on outdoor hard courts at the Khalifa International Tennis Complex in Doha in Qatar and was part of the International Series of the 2001 ATP Tour. It was the ninth edition of the tournament and was held from 1 January through 7 January 2001. Unseeded Marcelo Ríos won the singles title.

== Finals ==
=== Singles ===
(Chile) Marcelo Ríos defeated (Czech Republic) Bohdan Ulihrach 6–3, 2–6, 6–3

- It was Ríos's 1st title of the year and the 18th of his career.

=== Doubles ===
(The Bahamas) Mark Knowles / (Canada) Daniel Nestor defeated (Spain) Juan Balcells / (Russia) Andrei Olhovskiy 6–3, 6–1

- It was Knowles's 1st title of the year and the 15th of his career. It was Nestor's 1st title of the year and the 17th of his career.
