= 1997 Pilot Pen International =

- Date: August 11–17
- Edition: 25th
- Category: Championship Series
- Draw: 64S / 32D
- Prize money: $915,000
- Surface: Hard / outdoor
- Location: New Haven, Connecticut, U.S.
- Venue: Cullman-Heyman Tennis Center

Champions

Singles
- (Russia) Yevgeni Kafelnikov

Doubles
- (India) Mahesh Bhupathi / (India) Leander Paes
- Pilot Pen International

The 1997 Pilot Pen International was a men's tennis tournament played on outdoor hard courts at the Cullman-Heyman Tennis Center in New Haven, Connecticut in the United States and was part of the Championship Series of the 1997 ATP Tour. It was the 25th edition of the tournament and ran from August 11 through August 17, 1997. First-seeded Yevgeni Kafelnikov won the singles title.

== Finals ==
=== Singles ===
(Russia) Yevgeni Kafelnikov defeated (Australia) Pat Rafter 7–6^{(7–4)}, 6–4

=== Doubles ===
(India) Mahesh Bhupathi / (India) Leander Paes defeated (Canada) Sébastien Lareau / (United States) Alex O'Brien 6–4, 6–7, 6–2
