= 2000 Qatar Open – Singles =

Singles
- 2000 Qatar Open

Final
- Champion: (France) Fabrice Santoro
- Runner-up: (Germany) Rainer Schüttler
- Score: 3–6, 7–5, 3–0, retired

Details
- Draw: 32
- Seeds: 8

Events
Singles	Doubles
- ATP Qatar Open

Fabrice Santoro defeated Rainer Schüttler 3–6, 7–5, and 3–0 after Schüttler retired to win the 2000 Qatar Open singles competition. Schüttler was the defending champion.

== Seeds ==
1. (Germany) Nicolas Kiefer (semifinals)
2. (Spain) Félix Mantilla (first round)
3. (France) Fabrice Santoro (champion)
4. (Morocco) Younes El Aynaoui (semifinals)
5. (Morocco) Hicham Arazi (first round)
6. (Czech Republic) Jiří Novák (first round)
7. (Czech Republic) Daniel Vacek (second round)
8. (Netherlands) Sjeng Schalken (quarterfinals)

== Draw ==
Key

- Q = Qualifier
- WC = Wild card
- LL = Lucky loser
- Alt = Alternate
- ITF = ITF entry
- PR = Protected ranking
- SR = Special ranking
- SE = Special exempt
- JE = Junior exempt
- JR = Junior Accelerator Programme entrant
- CO = College Accelerator Programme entrant
- NG = Next Gen Accelerator Program entrant
- w/o = Walkover
- r = Retired
- d = Defaulted

=== Finals ===
Semifinals
1	(Germany) Nicolas Kiefer	5	4
3	(France) Fabrice Santoro	7	6
4	(Morocco) Younes El Aynaoui	7^{7}	4	4
(Germany) Rainer Schüttler	6^{3}	6	6

Final
3	(France) Fabrice Santoro	3	7	3
(Germany) Rainer Schüttler	6	5	0^{r}

=== Section 1 ===
First round
1	(Germany) N Kiefer	7^{8}	7^{8}
(United States) J Tarango	6^{6}	6^{6}
Q	(Italy) C Caratti	7^{7}	4	6
Q	(Switzerland) I Heuberger	6^{4}	6	4
(Netherlands) J Siemerink	2	4
(Argentina) F Squillari	6	6
(Spain) J Díaz	5	4
8	(Netherlands) S Schalken	7	6
3	(France) F Santoro	6	6
WC	(Germany) L Burgsmüller	4	1
(Netherlands) J van Lottum	6	0
(Spain) G Blanco	4	1^{r}
(Spain) A Berasategui	6	6
WC	(Qatar) S Khalfan	3	4
(Switzerland) G Bastl	6	7
6	(Czech Republic) J Novák	2	5

Second round
1	(Germany) N Kiefer	6	6
Q	(Italy) C Caratti	1	1
(Argentina) F Squillari	6	1	1
8	(Netherlands) S Schalken	4	6	6
3	(France) F Santoro	7^{11}	6
(Netherlands) J van Lottum	6^{9}	1
(Spain) A Berasategui	3	1
(Switzerland) G Bastl	6	6

Quarterfinals
1	(Germany) N Kiefer	6	6
8	(Netherlands) S Schalken	1	0
3	(France) F Santoro	6	6
(Switzerland) G Bastl	2	4

Semifinals
1	(Germany) N Kiefer	5	4
3	(France) F Santoro	7	6

=== Section 2 ===
First round
5	(Morocco) H Arazi	2	4
Q	(Russia) A Cherkasov	6	6
(Croatia) G Ivanišević	6^{2}	4
(Sweden) M Tillström	7^{7}	6
(Argentina) G Gaudio	4	6	6
Q	(Czech Republic) P Luxa	6	0	2
(France) A Dupuis	6	3	2
4	(Morocco) Y El Aynaoui	4	6	6
7	(Czech Republic) D Vacek	0	6	6
(Spain) F Vicente	6	3	4
WC	(Spain) J Sánchez	2	6^{5}
(Germany) R Schüttler	6	7^{7}
(Argentina) M Puerta	5	2
(Belarus) M Mirnyi	7	6
(Costa Rica) J Marín	6	0
2	(Spain) F Mantilla	1	0^{r}

Second round
Q	(Russia) A Cherkasov	6^{5}	4
(Sweden) M Tillström	7^{7}	6
(Argentina) G Gaudio	4	4
4	(Morocco) Y El Aynaoui	6	6
7	(Czech Republic) D Vacek	3	2
(Germany) R Schüttler	6	6
(Belarus) M Mirnyi	6	6
(Costa Rica) J Marín	0	1

Quarterfinals
(Sweden) M Tillström	5	3
4	(Morocco) Y El Aynaoui	7	6
(Germany) R Schüttler	6	6
(Belarus) M Mirnyi	3	2

Semifinals
4	(Morocco) Y El Aynaoui	7^{7}	4	4
(Germany) R Schüttler	6^{3}	6	6
