= 1998 Pilot Pen International =

- Date: August 17–23 (men); August 24–29 (women)
- Edition: 25th (men) / 31st (women)
- Surface: Hard / outdoor
- Location: New Haven, Connecticut, U.S.
- Venue: Cullman-Heyman Tennis Center

Champions

Men's singles
- (Slovakia) Karol Kučera

Women's singles
- (Germany) Steffi Graf

Men's doubles
- (Australia) Wayne Arthurs / (Australia) Peter Tramacchi

Women's doubles
- (France) Alexandra Fusai / (France) Nathalie Tauziat
- Pilot Pen International

The 1998 Pilot Pen International was a tennis tournament played on outdoor hard courts at the Cullman-Heyman Tennis Center in New Haven, Connecticut, in the United States that was part of the International Series Gold of the 1998 ATP Tour and of Tier II of the 1998 WTA Tour. The men's tournament was held from August 17 through August 23, 1998, while the women's tournament was held from August 24 through August 29, 1998. Karol Kučera and Steffi Graf won the singles titles.

== Finals ==
=== Men's singles ===
(Slovakia) Karol Kučera defeated (Croatia) Goran Ivanišević 6–4, 5–7, 6–2

- It was Kučera's 2nd title of the year and the 4th of his career.

=== Women's singles ===
(Germany) Steffi Graf defeated (Czech Republic) Jana Novotná 6–4, 6–1

- It was Graf's 1st title of the year and the 115th of her career.

=== Men's doubles ===
(Australia) Wayne Arthurs / (Australia) Peter Tramacchi defeated (Canada) Sébastien Lareau / (United States) Alex O'Brien 7–6, 1–6, 6–3

- It was Arthurs' 2nd title of the year and the 4th of his career. It was Tramacchi's only title of the year and the 1st of his career.

=== Women's doubles ===
(France) Alexandra Fusai / (France) Nathalie Tauziat defeated (South Africa) Mariaan de Swardt / (Czech Republic) Jana Novotná 6–1, 6–0

- It was Fusai's 3rd title of the year and the 7th of her career. It was Tauziat's 3rd title of the year and the 21st of her career.
