= 1998 Pilot Pen International – Women's singles =

Women's singles
- 1998 Pilot Pen International

Final
- Champion: (Germany) Steffi Graf
- Runner-up: (Czech Republic) Jana Novotná
- Score: 6–4, 6–1

Details
- Draw: 28
- Seeds: 8

Events
Singles	men	women
Doubles	men	women
- Pilot Pen International

Lindsay Davenport was the defending champion but lost in the semifinals to Steffi Graf.

Graf won in the final 6–4, 6–1 against Jana Novotná.

== Seeds ==
A champion seed is indicated in bold text while text in italics indicates the round in which that seed was eliminated. The top four seeds received a bye to the second round.

1. (United States) Lindsay Davenport (semifinals)
2. (Czech Republic) Jana Novotná (final)
3. (Spain) Arantxa Sánchez Vicario (second round)
4. (Germany) **Steffi Graf (champion)**
5. (France) Nathalie Tauziat (first round)
6. (Switzerland) Patty Schnyder (second round)
7. (South Africa) Amanda Coetzer (quarterfinals)
8. (Belgium) Dominique Van Roost (first round)

== Draw ==
Key

- Q = Qualifier
- WC = Wild card
- LL = Lucky loser
- Alt = Alternate
- ITF = ITF entry
- PR = Protected ranking
- SR = Special ranking
- SE = Special exempt
- JE = Junior exempt
- JR = Junior Accelerator Programme entrant
- CO = College Accelerator Programme entrant
- NG = Next Gen Accelerator Program entrant
- w/o = Walkover
- r = Retired
- d = Defaulted

=== Final ===
Final
WC/4	(Germany) **Steffi Graf**	**6**	**6**
2	(Czech Republic) Jana Novotná	4	1

=== Top half ===
First round
Q	(United States) A Miller	2	**6**	2
Q	(Spain) **V Ruano Pascual**	**6**	3	**6**
(Italy) S Farina	2	3
(Germany) **A Huber**	**6**	**6**
Q	(Italy) R Grande	4	3
6	(Switzerland) **P Schnyder**	**6**	**6**
(Slovakia) **H Nagyová**	**6**	**6**
(Venezuela) M Vento	3	2
(Austria) B Schett	3	2
(Russia) **A Kournikova**	**6**	**6**
(Spain) M Serna	6	3
7	(South Africa) **A Coetzer**	**7**	**6**

Second round
1	(United States) **L Davenport**	**w/o**
Q	(Spain) V Ruano Pascual
(Germany) **A Huber**	**7**	**7**
6	(Switzerland) P Schnyder	5	6
WC/4	(Germany) **S Graf**	**6**	**6**
(Slovakia) H Nagyová	1	3
(Russia) A Kournikova	**6**	4	5
7	(South Africa) **A Coetzer**	1	**6**	**7**

Quarterfinals
1	(United States) **L Davenport**	**6**	**6**
(Germany) A Huber	3	3
WC/4	(Germany) **S Graf**	**6**	**6**
7	(South Africa) A Coetzer	3	0

Semifinals
1	(United States) L Davenport	3	6
WC/4	(Germany) **S Graf**	**6**	**7**

=== Bottom half ===
First round
8	(Belgium) D Van Roost	**6**	0	1
WC	(United States) **M J Fernández**	3	**6**	**6**
(France) **S Testud**	**6**	**6**
(Romania) R Dragomir	4	1
(Japan) N Sawamatsu	**6**	3	5
(France) **J Halard-Decugis**	3	**6**	**7**
5	(France) N Tauziat	6	0
(France) **A Mauresmo**	**7**	**6**
(South Africa) J Kruger	4	**6**	6
Q	(France) **A Dechaume-Balleret**	**6**	3	**7**
WC	(United States) **C Rubin**	3	**6**	**6**
(Russia) E Likhovtseva	**6**	3	1

Second round
WC	(United States) **M J Fernández**	**6**	4	**6**
(France) S Testud	3	**6**	4
(France) **J Halard-Decugis**	**7**	**6**
3	(Spain) A Sánchez Vicario	6	2
(France) **A Mauresmo**	**6**	**6**
Q	(France) A Dechaume-Balleret	4	1
WC	(United States) C Rubin	1	5
2	(Czech Republic) **J Novotná**	**6**	**7**

Quarterfinals
WC	(United States) M J Fernández	5	1
(France) **J Halard-Decugis**	**7**	**6**
(France) A Mauresmo	1	6
2	(Czech Republic) **J Novotná**	**6**	**7**

Semifinals
(France) J Halard-Decugis	4	4
2	(Czech Republic) **J Novotná**	**6**	**6**
