= 2022 Upper Austria Open – Singles =

Singles
- 2022 Upper Austria Open

Final
- Champion: (Austria) Jurij Rodionov
- Runner-up: (Czech Republic) Jiří Lehečka
- Score: 6–4, 6–4

Events
Singles	Doubles
Upper Austria Open	· 2023 →

This was the first edition of the tournament.

Jurij Rodionov won the title after defeating Jiří Lehečka 6–4, 6–4 in the final.

== Seeds ==
1. (Australia) John Millman (quarterfinals)
2. (Czech Republic) Jiří Lehečka (final)
3. (Colombia) Daniel Elahi Galán (second round)
4. (Slovakia) Norbert Gombos (withdrew)
5. (Moldova) Radu Albot (quarterfinals)
6. (Germany) Mats Moraing (first round, retired)
7. (Czech Republic) Zdeněk Kolář (second round)
8. (Austria) Dennis Novak (semifinals)
9. Egor Gerasimov (first round)

== Draw ==
=== Key ===
- Q = Qualifier
- WC = Wild card
- LL = Lucky loser
- Alt = Alternate
- SE = Special exempt
- PR = Protected ranking
- ITF = ITF entry
- JE = Junior exempt
- w/o = Walkover
- r = Retired
- d = Defaulted
- SR = Special ranking

=== Finals ===
Semifinals
Q	(Hungary) Máté Valkusz	2	4
(Austria) Jurij Rodionov	6	6
8	(Austria) Dennis Novak	2	3
2	(Czech Republic) Jiří Lehečka	6	6

Final
(Austria) Jurij Rodionov	6	6
2	(Czech Republic) Jiří Lehečka	4	4

=== Top half ===
First round
1	(Australia) J Millman	6	4	6
Q	(Spain) N Sánchez Izquierdo	3	6	2
(France) E Couacaud	6	6
(Germany) C-M Stebe	2	1
(Bosnia and Herzegovina) D Džumhur	2^{r}
Q	(Hungary) M Valkusz	5
(Italy) F Agamenone	6	4	3
7	(Czech Republic) Z Kolář	1	6	6
3	(Colombia) DE Galán	6	3	6
LL	(Lebanon) B Hassan	3	6	3
(Austria) J Rodionov	6	6
(Slovakia) L Lacko	1	0
Alt	(Hungary) A Balázs	6	6
Q	(Serbia) M Sabanov	4	4
(Turkey) A Çelikbilek	4	6	4
6	(Germany) M Moraing	6	3	2^{r}

Second round
1	(Australia) J Millman	6	7^{7}
(France) E Couacaud	2	6^{2}
Q	(Hungary) M Valkusz	7^{7}	6
7	(Czech Republic) Z Kolář	6^{4}	3
3	(Colombia) DE Galán	5	1
(Austria) J Rodionov	7	6
Alt	(Hungary) A Balázs	7^{7}	3
(Turkey) A Çelikbilek	6^{0}	0^{r}

Quarterfinals
1	(Australia) J Millman	4	6	3
Q	(Hungary) M Valkusz	6	1	6
(Austria) J Rodionov	6	3
Alt	(Hungary) A Balázs	4	0^{r}

Semifinals
Q	(Hungary) M Valkusz	2	4
(Austria) J Rodionov	6	6

=== Bottom half ===
First round
8	(Austria) D Novak	6	6
(Germany) D Masur	3	4
(Croatia) B Gojo	4	3
WC	(Austria) G Melzer	6	6
(Croatia) N Serdarušić	7^{7}	6
Q	(Bosnia and Herzegovina) N Fatić	6^{5}	4
Q	(Austria) L Miedler	7	6
9	E Gerasimov	5	4
5	(Moldova) R Albot	6	6
(Slovakia) J Kovalík	4	0
Q	A Shevchenko	2	6	6
WC	(Austria) L Neumayer	6	3	0
(Slovenia) B Rola	3	6	2
WC	(Austria) F Misolic	6	4	6
(Kazakhstan) T Skatov	7^{7}	3	4
2	(Czech Republic) J Lehečka	6^{3}	6	6

Second round
8	(Austria) D Novak	2	6	0
WC	(Austria) G Melzer	6	3	0^{r}
(Croatia) N Serdarušić	6^{4}	2
Q	(Austria) L Miedler	7^{7}	6
5	(Moldova) R Albot	2	6	7^{11}
Q	A Shevchenko	6	3	6^{9}
WC	(Austria) F Misolic	4	4
2	(Czech Republic) J Lehečka	6	6

Quarterfinals
8	(Austria) D Novak	6^{6}	6	7^{7}
Q	(Austria) L Miedler	7^{8}	1	6^{5}
5	(Moldova) R Albot	1	4
2	(Czech Republic) J Lehečka	6	6

Semifinals
8	(Austria) D Novak	2	3
2	(Czech Republic) J Lehečka	6	6
