= 2025 Upper Austria Open – Singles =

Singles
- 2025 Upper Austria Open

Final
- Champion: (Chile) Cristian Garín
- Runner-up: (Chile) Tomás Barrios Vera
- Score: 3–6, 6–1, 6–4

Events
Singles	Doubles
← 2024 ·	Upper Austria Open	· 2026 →

Lucas Pouille was the defending champion but chose not to defend his title.

Cristian Garín won the title after defeating Tomás Barrios Vera 3–6, 6–1, 6–4 in the final.

== Seeds ==
1. (Belgium) Raphaël Collignon (withdrew)
2. (Brazil) Thiago Monteiro (first round)
3. (Croatia) Marin Čilić (first round)
4. (Italy) Fabio Fognini (first round)
5. (Chile) Tomás Barrios Vera (final)
6. (Japan) Taro Daniel (first round)
7. (Switzerland) Jérôme Kym (semifinals)
8. (Argentina) Thiago Agustín Tirante (quarterfinals)

== Draw ==
=== Key ===
- Q = Qualifier
- WC = Wild card
- LL = Lucky loser
- Alt = Alternate
- ITF = ITF entry
- PR = Protected ranking
- SR = Special ranking
- SE = Special exempt
- JE = Junior exempt
- JR = Junior Accelerator Programme entrant
- CO = College Accelerator Programme entrant
- NG = Next Gen Accelerator Program entrant
- w/o = Walkover
- r = Retired
- d = Defaulted

=== Finals ===
Semifinals
7	(Switzerland) Jérôme Kym	3	5
5	(Chile) Tomás Barrios Vera	6	7
(Chile) Cristian Garín	3	6	6
(Argentina) Román Andrés Burruchaga	6	4	0

Final
5	(Chile) Tomás Barrios Vera	6	1	4
(Chile) Cristian Garín	3	6	6

=== Top half ===
First round
LL	(Bosnia and Herzegovina) N Fatić	5	5
(Belgium) A Blockx	7	7
(Spain) A Moro Cañas	2	6^{7}
Q	(Brazil) T Seyboth Wild	6	7^{9}
NG	(Norway) N Budkov Kjær	5	5
(Austria) L Neumayer	7	7
Q	(Austria) D Pichler	1	3
7	(Switzerland) J Kym	6	6
3	(Croatia) M Čilić	6	1	6^{4}
SE	(Italy) M Gigante	4	6	7^{7}
(Argentina) M Trungelliti	7	6
(Kazakhstan) T Skatov	5	4
Alt	(Lebanon) B Hassan	5	7	6^{1}
(Spain) M Landaluce	7	5	7^{7}
(Austria) J Rodionov	3	6	3
5	(Chile) T Barrios Vera	6	3	6

Second round
(Belgium) A Blockx	7	4	6
Q	(Brazil) T Seyboth Wild	5	6	3
(Austria) L Neumayer	6^{5}	0
7	(Switzerland) J Kym	7^{7}	6
SE	(Italy) M Gigante	6	6^{10}	3
(Argentina) M Trungelliti	4	7^{12}	6
(Spain) M Landaluce	3	7	4
5	(Chile) T Barrios Vera	6	5	6

Quarterfinals
(Belgium) A Blockx
7	(Switzerland) J Kym	w/o
(Argentina) M Trungelliti	2	4
5	(Chile) T Barrios Vera	6	6

Semifinals
7	(Switzerland) J Kym	3	5
5	(Chile) T Barrios Vera	6	7

=== Bottom half ===
First round
6	(Japan) T Daniel	0	1
(Chile) C Garín	6	6
Q	(Switzerland) J Paul	6	4	4
(Lithuania) V Gaubas	3	6	6
Q	(Czech Republic) Tadeáš Paroulek	3	5
WC	(Austria) J Schwärzler	6	7
WC	(Austria) N Oberleitner	5	6	6
4/WC	(Italy) F Fognini	7	3	2
8	(Argentina) TA Tirante	7	6
Q	(Switzerland) M Brunold	5	4
(Georgia (country)) N Basilashvili	6^{5}	7^{7}	4
(Austria) F Misolic	7^{7}	6^{5}	6
(Argentina) RA Burruchaga	6	6
Q	(Bulgaria) D Kuzmanov	2	2
(Japan) S Mochizuki	6	6
2	(Brazil) T Monteiro	3	3

Second round
(Chile) C Garín	3	6	6
(Lithuania) V Gaubas	6	3	4
WC	(Austria) J Schwärzler	4	6^{2}
WC	(Austria) N Oberleitner	6	7^{7}
8	(Argentina) TA Tirante	7^{7}	6
(Austria) F Misolic	6^{3}	3
(Argentina) RA Burruchaga	6	6
(Japan) S Mochizuki	4	2

Quarterfinals
(Chile) C Garín	6	6^{6}	6
WC	(Austria) N Oberleitner	2	7^{8}	4
8	(Argentina) TA Tirante	5	6	3
(Argentina) RA Burruchaga	7	4	6

Semifinals
(Chile) C Garín	3	6	6
(Argentina) RA Burruchaga	6	4	0
