= 2024 Upper Austria Open – Doubles =

Doubles
- 2024 Upper Austria Open

Final
- Champions: (Germany) Constantin Frantzen (Germany) Hendrik Jebens
- Runners-up: (United States) Ryan Seggerman (United States) Patrik Trhac
- Score: 6–4, 6–4

Events
Singles	Doubles
← 2023 ·	Upper Austria Open	· 2025 →

Romain Arneodo and Sam Weissborn were the defending champions but only Weissborn chose to defend his title, partnering Philipp Oswald. They lost in the first round to Neil Oberleitner and Joel Schwärzler.

Constantin Frantzen and Hendrik Jebens won the title after defeating Ryan Seggerman and Patrik Trhac 6–4, 6–4 in the final.

== Seeds ==
1. (Austria) Alexander Erler / (Austria) Lucas Miedler (first round)
2. (Germany) Constantin Frantzen / (Germany) Hendrik Jebens (champions)
3. (Ecuador) Diego Hidalgo / (Ukraine) Denys Molchanov (quarterfinals)
4. (Austria) Philipp Oswald / (Austria) Sam Weissborn (first round)

== Draw ==
Key

- Q = Qualifier
- WC = Wild card
- LL = Lucky loser
- Alt = Alternate
- ITF = ITF entry
- PR = Protected ranking
- SR = Special ranking
- SE = Special exempt
- JE = Junior exempt
- JR = Junior Accelerator Programme entrant
- CO = College Accelerator Programme entrant
- NG = Next Gen Accelerator Program entrant
- w/o = Walkover
- r = Retired
- d = Defaulted

=== Draw ===
First round
1	(Austria) A Erler (Austria) L Miedler	4	6^{6}
(France) U Blanchet (France) M Martineau	6	7^{8}
(United States) C Harrison (France) F Martin	6^{1}	7^{7}	[10]
WC	(Croatia) M Dodig (Austria) F Misolic	7^{7}	6^{5}	[6]
3	(Ecuador) D Hidalgo (Ukraine) D Molchanov	w/o
(Argentina) RA Burruchaga (Argentina) JM Cerúndolo
(Sweden) F Bergevi (Netherlands) M Veldheer	2	4
(Brazil) O Luz (Brazil) F Romboli	6	6
WC	(Austria) N Oberleitner (Austria) J Schwärzler	7	7^{7}
4	(Austria) P Oswald (Austria) S Weissborn	5	6^{3}
PR	(Jamaica) D Brown (United States) E King	7	6^{6}	[8]
I Liutarevich (Spain) D Vega Hernández	5	7^{8}	[10]
(Slovakia) J Kovalík (Slovakia) I Zelenay	4	4
2	(Germany) C Frantzen (Germany) H Jebens	6	6

Quarterfinals
(France) U Blanchet (France) M Martineau	4	7^{7}	[10]
(United States) C Harrison (France) F Martin	6	6^{3}	[7]
3	(Ecuador) D Hidalgo (Ukraine) D Molchanov	6^{4}	2
(United States) R Seggerman (United States) P Trhac	7^{7}	6
(Brazil) O Luz (Brazil) F Romboli	4	4
WC	(Austria) N Oberleitner (Austria) J Schwärzler	6	6
I Liutarevich (Spain) D Vega Hernández	4	0
2	(Germany) C Frantzen (Germany) H Jebens	6	6

Semifinals
(France) U Blanchet (France) M Martineau	4	6^{4}
(United States) R Seggerman (United States) P Trhac	6	7^{7}
WC	(Austria) N Oberleitner (Austria) J Schwärzler	4	3
2	(Germany) C Frantzen (Germany) H Jebens	6	6

Final
(United States) R Seggerman (United States) P Trhac	4	4
2	(Germany) C Frantzen (Germany) H Jebens	6	6
