= 2025 Upper Austria Open – Doubles =

Doubles
- 2025 Upper Austria Open

Final
- Champions: (Austria) Nico Hipfl (Switzerland) Jérôme Kym
- Runners-up: (United States) Ryan Seggerman (United Kingdom) David Stevenson
- Score: 7–5, 3–6, [10–2]

Events
| Singles | Doubles |
| ← 2024 · | Upper Austria Open | · 2026 → |

Constantin Frantzen and Hendrik Jebens were the defending champions but chose not to defend their title.

Nico Hipfl and Jérôme Kym won the title after defeating Ryan Seggerman and David Stevenson 7–5, 3–6, [10–2] in the final.

== Seeds ==
1. (Switzerland) Jakub Paul / (Netherlands) David Pel (quarterfinals)
2. (United States) Patrik Trhac / (United Kingdom) Marcus Willis (first round)
3. (India) Anirudh Chandrasekar / (Netherlands) Matwé Middelkoop (semifinals)
4. (United States) Ryan Seggerman / (United Kingdom) David Stevenson (final)

== Draw ==
=== Key ===
- Q = Qualifier
- WC = Wild card
- LL = Lucky loser
- Alt = Alternate
- ITF = ITF entry
- PR = Protected ranking
- SR = Special ranking
- SE = Special exempt
- JE = Junior exempt
- JR = Junior Accelerator Programme entrant
- CO = College Accelerator Programme entrant
- NG = Next Gen Accelerator Program entrant
- w/o = Walkover
- r = Retired
- d = Defaulted

=== Draw ===
First round
1 | (Switzerland) J Paul (Netherlands) D Pel | w/o
(Argentina) RA Burruchaga (Argentina) TA Tirante
(Austria) N Oberleitner (Brazil) M Zormann | 3 | 7^{7} | [11]
(Serbia) I Sabanov (Serbia) M Sabanov | 6 | 6^{4} | [9]
4 | (United States) R Seggerman (United Kingdom) D Stevenson | 6 | 6
(Chile) T Barrios Vera (Chile) C Garín | 3 | 4
(Romania) A Jecan (Romania) B Pavel | 6 | 6
WC | (Austria) Syl Gaxherri (Austria) Matthias Ujvary | 2 | 4
(Lebanon) B Hassan (Austria) L Neumayer | 6 | 6
(Croatia) M Dodig (Austria) F Misolic | 4 | 4
I Liutarevich (Netherlands) M Veldheer | 4 | 7^{7} | [6]
3 | (India) A Chandrasekar (Netherlands) M Middelkoop | 6 | 6^{1} | [10]
(Spain) A Moro Cañas (Argentina) M Trungelliti | 2 | 6^{5}
(Austria) D Pichler (Austria) J Rodionov | 6 | 7^{7}
WC | (Austria) N Hipfl (Switzerland) J Kym | 7^{7} | 7^{7}
2 | (United States) P Trhac (United Kingdom) M Willis | 6^{5} | 6^{5}

Quarterfinals
1 | (Switzerland) J Paul (Netherlands) D Pel | 4 | 6^{4}
(Austria) N Oberleitner (Brazil) M Zormann | 6 | 7^{7}
4 | (United States) R Seggerman (United Kingdom) D Stevenson | 7^{12} | 7^{11}
(Romania) A Jecan (Romania) B Pavel | 6^{10} | 6^{9}
(Lebanon) B Hassan (Austria) L Neumayer | 0 | 6 | [7]
3 | (India) A Chandrasekar (Netherlands) M Middelkoop | 6 | 3 | [10]
(Austria) D Pichler (Austria) J Rodionov | 5 | 4
WC | (Austria) N Hipfl (Switzerland) J Kym | 7 | 6

Semifinals
(Austria) N Oberleitner (Brazil) M Zormann | 4 | 7^{7} | [5]
4 | (United States) R Seggerman (United Kingdom) D Stevenson | 6 | 6^{2} | [10]
3 | (India) A Chandrasekar (Netherlands) M Middelkoop | 6^{1} | 2
WC | (Austria) N Hipfl (Switzerland) J Kym | 7^{7} | 6

Final
4 | (United States) R Seggerman (United Kingdom) D Stevenson | 5 | 6 | [2]
WC | (Austria) N Hipfl (Switzerland) J Kym | 7 | 3 | [10]
