= 2022 Upper Austria Open =

- Date: 2–8 May
- Edition: 1st
- Surface: Clay
- Location: Mauthausen, Austria

Champions

Singles
- (Austria) Jurij Rodionov

Doubles
- (Netherlands) Sander Arends / (Netherlands) David Pel
- Upper Austria Open

The 2022 Danube Upper Austria Open was a professional tennis tournament played on clay courts. It was the first edition of the tournament which was part of the 2022 ATP Challenger Tour. It took place in Mauthausen, Austria between 2 and 8 May 2022.

== Singles main-draw entrants ==
=== Seeds ===
| Country | Player | Rank^{1} | Seed |
|---|---|---|---|
| AUS | John Millman | 79 | 1 |
| CZE | Jiří Lehečka | 88 | 2 |
| COL | Daniel Elahi Galán | 105 | 3 |
| ~~SVK~~ | ~~Norbert Gombos~~ | ~~106~~ | ~~4~~ |
| MDA | Radu Albot | 121 | 5 |
| GER | Mats Moraing | 126 | 6 |
| CZE | Zdeněk Kolář | 137 | 7 |
| AUT | Dennis Novak | 149 | 8 |
| | Egor Gerasimov | 150 | 9 |

- ^{1} Rankings as of 25 April 2022.

=== Other entrants ===
The following players received wildcards into the singles main draw:

- (Austria) Gerald Melzer
- (Austria) Filip Misolic
- (Austria) Lukas Neumayer

The following player received entry into the singles main draw as an alternate:

- (Hungary) Attila Balázs

The following players received entry from the qualifying draw:

- (Bosnia and Herzegovina) Nerman Fatić
- (Austria) Lucas Miedler
- (Serbia) Matej Sabanov
- (Spain) Nikolás Sánchez Izquierdo
- Alexander Shevchenko
- (Hungary) Máté Valkusz

The following player received entry as a lucky loser:

- (Lebanon) Benjamin Hassan

== Champions ==
=== Singles ===
- (Austria) Jurij Rodionov def. (Czech Republic) Jiří Lehečka 6–4, 6–4.

=== Doubles ===
- (Netherlands) Sander Arends / (Netherlands) David Pel def. (Germany) Johannes Härteis / (Lebanon) Benjamin Hassan 6–4, 6–3.
