= 2025 Upper Austria Open =

- Date: 28 April – 4 May
- Edition: 4th
- Surface: Clay
- Location: Mauthausen, Austria

Champions

Singles
- (Chile) Cristian Garín

Doubles
- (Austria) Nico Hipfl / (Switzerland) Jérôme Kym
← 2024 ·	Upper Austria Open	· 2026 →

The 2025 Danube Upper Austria Open powered by SKE was a professional tennis tournament played on clay courts. It was the fourth edition of the tournament which was part of the 2025 ATP Challenger Tour. It took place in Mauthausen, Austria between 28 April and 4 May 2025.

== Singles main-draw entrants ==
=== Seeds ===
Country	Player	Rank^{1}	Seed
~~BEL~~	~~Raphaël Collignon~~	~~81~~	~~1~~
BRA	Thiago Monteiro	94	2
CRO	Marin Čilić	109	3
ITA	Fabio Fognini	112	4
CHI	Tomás Barrios Vera	128	5
JPN	Taro Daniel	131	6
SUI	Jérôme Kym	133	7
ARG	Thiago Agustín Tirante	134	8

- ^{1} Rankings as of 21 April 2025.

=== Other entrants ===
The following players received wildcards into the singles main draw:

- (Italy) Fabio Fognini
- (Austria) Neil Oberleitner
- (Austria) Joel Schwärzler

The following player received entry into the singles main draw as a special exempt:

- (Italy) Matteo Gigante

The following player received entry into the singles main draw through the Next Gen Accelerator programme:

- (Norway) Nicolai Budkov Kjær

The following player received entry into the singles main draw as an alternate:

- (Lebanon) Benjamin Hassan

The following players received entry from the qualifying draw:

- (Switzerland) Mika Brunold
- (Bulgaria) Dimitar Kuzmanov
- (Czech Republic) Tadeáš Paroulek
- (Switzerland) Jakub Paul
- (Austria) David Pichler
- (Brazil) Thiago Seyboth Wild

The following player received entry as a lucky loser:

- (Bosnia and Herzegovina) Nerman Fatić

== Champions ==
=== Singles ===
- (Chile) Cristian Garín def. (Chile) Tomás Barrios Vera 3–6, 6–1, 6–4.

=== Doubles ===
- (Austria) Nico Hipfl / (Switzerland) Jérôme Kym def. (United States) Ryan Seggerman / (United Kingdom) David Stevenson 7–5, 3–6, [10–2].
