= Lucas Pouille career statistics =

Career finals
Discipline	Type	Won	Lost	Total	WR
Singles	Grand Slam	–	–	–	–
Singles	Olympic Games	–	–	–	–
Singles	ATP Finals	–	–	–	–
Singles	ATP Masters 1000	–	–	–	–
Singles	ATP Tour 500	1	1	2	0.50
Singles	ATP Tour 250	4	3	7	0.57
Singles	Total	5	4	9	0.56
Doubles	Grand Slam	–	–	–	–
Doubles	Olympic Games	–	–	–	–
Doubles	ATP Finals	–	–	–	–
Doubles	ATP Masters 1000	–	–	–	–
Doubles	ATP Tour 500	–	–	–	–
Doubles	ATP Tour 250	–	–	–	–
Doubles	Total	–	–	–	–
Total		5	4	9	0.56

This is a list of the main career statistics of French professional tennis player Lucas Pouille. All statistics are according to the ATP World Tour and ITF websites.

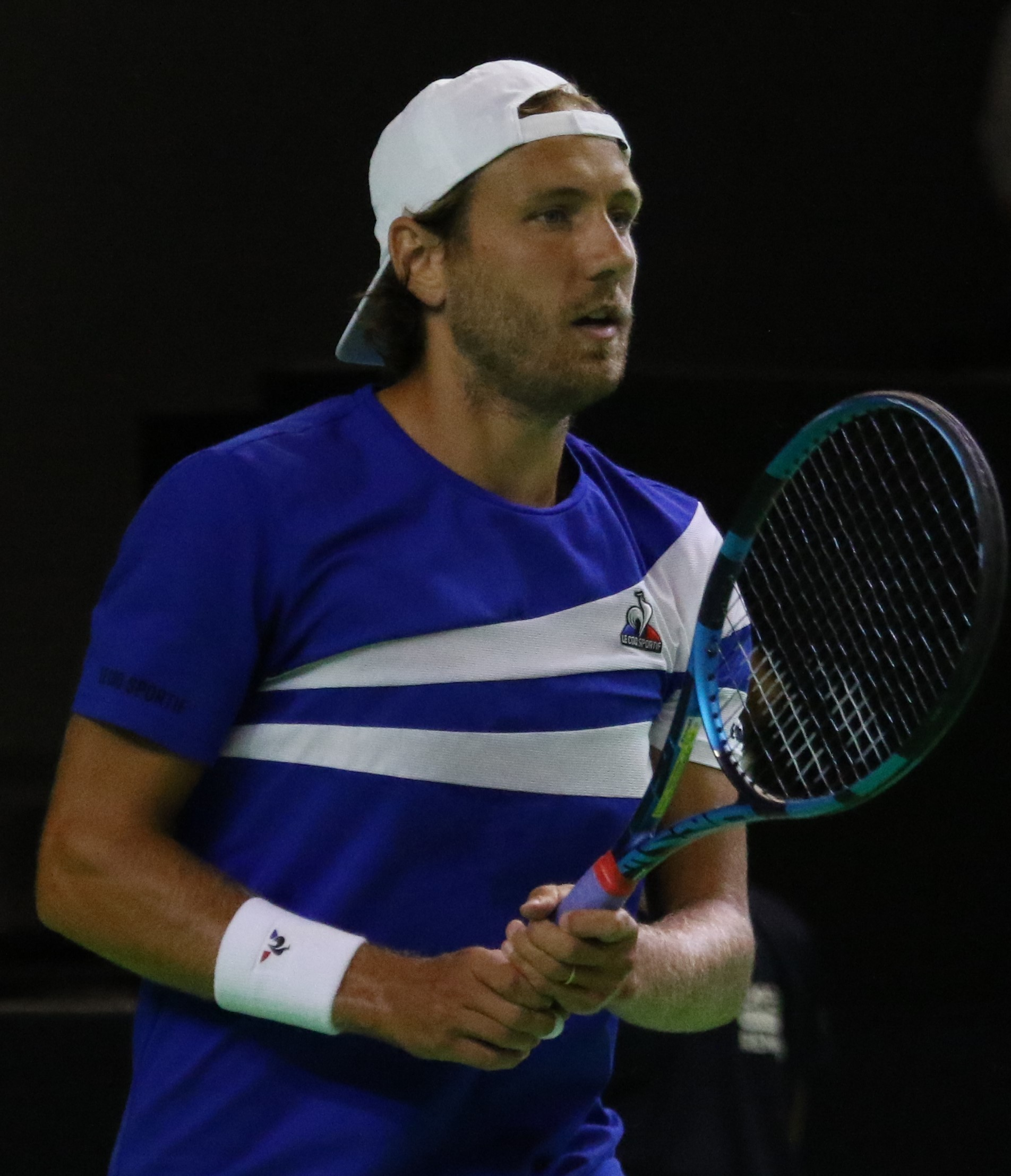
French player Lucas Pouille in 2021.

== Performance timelines ==
Key
W	F	SF	QF	#R	RR	Q#	P#	DNQ	A	Z#	PO	G	S	B	NMS	NTI	P	NH

(W) winner; (F) finalist; (SF) semifinalist; (QF) quarterfinalist; (#R) rounds 4, 3, 2, 1; (RR) round-robin stage; (Q#) qualification round; (P#) preliminary round; (DNQ) did not qualify; (A) absent; (Z#) Davis/Fed Cup Zonal Group (with number indication) or (PO) play-off; (G) gold, (S) silver or (B) bronze Olympic/Paralympic medal; (NMS) not a Masters tournament; (NTI) not a Tier I tournament; (P) postponed; (NH) not held; (SR) strike rate (events won / competed); (W–L) win–loss record.
To avoid confusion and double counting, these charts are updated at the conclusion of a tournament or when the player's participation has ended.

=== Singles ===
Current through the 2024 Wimbledon Championships.

Tournament	2013	2014	2015	2016	2017	2018	2019	2020	2021	2022	2023	2024	SR	W–L	Win %
Grand Slam tournaments
Australian Open	Q2	1R	1R	1R	1R	1R	SF	A	A	1R	A	A	0 / 7	5–7	42%
French Open	2R	1R	1R	2R	3R	3R	2R	A	1R	1R	2R	Q1	0 / 10	8–10	44%
Wimbledon	A	Q1	1R	QF	2R	2R	3R	NH	1R	A	Q3	3R	0 / 7	10–6	63%
US Open	Q2	A	1R	QF	4R	3R	2R	A	1R	A	A	Q3	0 / 6	10–6	63%
Win–loss	1–1	0–2	0–4	9–4	6–4	5–4	9–4	0–0	0–3	0–2	1–1	2–0	0 / 30	33–29	53%
ATP Masters 1000
Indian Wells Masters	A	A	A	1R	3R	2R	2R	NH	A	A	A	2R	0 / 4	1–4	20%
Miami Masters	A	A	A	4R	2R	A	2R	NH	A	A	A	A	0 / 3	3–3	50%
Monte Carlo Masters	A	A	2R	3R	SF	2R	1R	NH	3R	A	A	Q1	0 / 6	9–6	60%
Madrid Masters	A	Q1	A	2R	1R	1R	2R	NH	A	2R	A	Q1	0 / 4	2–4	33%
Rome Masters	A	A	A	SF	1R	2R	1R	A	A	A	A	A	0 / 4	3–4	43%
Canada Masters	A	A	A	2R	1R	1R	1R	NH	A	A	A	A	0 / 4	1–4	20%
Cincinnati Masters	A	A	A	1R	A	2R	QF	A	A	A	A	A	0 / 3	4–3	57%
Shanghai Masters	A	A	Q1	3R	2R	A	2R	NH		A	A	A	0 / 3	4–3	60%
Paris Masters	A	3R	1R	3R	3R	1R	A	A	Q1	A	A	A	0 / 5	4–5	44%
Win–loss	0–0	2–1	1–2	12–9	7–8	2–7	5–8	0–0	2–1	0–0	3–3	1–1	0 / 37	32–37	45%
Career statistics
	2013	2014	2015	2016	2017	2018	2019	2020	2021	2022	2023	2024	Career		
Tournaments	4	4	14	22	23	21	21	0	13	3	1	2	Career total: 125		
Titles	0	0	0	1	3	1	0	0	0	0	0	0	Career total: 5		
Finals	0	0	0	2	4	3	0	0	0	0	0	0	Career total: 9		
Hard win–loss	0–2	2–2	7–9	20–14	19–15	17–12	14–13	0–0	3–5	2–3	0–0	1–2	84–75		53%
Clay win–loss	1–1	0–2	5–4	10–5	11–5	5–6	2–5	0–0	2–7	0–0	1–1	0–0	36–35		51%
Grass win–loss	0–1	0–0	0–1	4–3	6–2	3–3	5–3	0–0	0–2	0–0	0–0	0–0	18–15		55%
Overall win–loss	1–4	2–4	12–14	34–22	36–22	25–21	21–21	0–0	5–14	2–3	1–1	1–2	138–125		
Win %	20%	33%	46%	61%	62%	54%	50%	–	26%	40%	50%	33%	Career total: 52%		
Year-end ranking	192	133	78	15	18	32	22	70	155	388	330	97			

=== Doubles ===
Tournament	2013	2014	2015	2016	2017	2018	2019	2020	2021	2022	SR	W–L	Win %
Grand Slam tournaments
Australian Open	A	A	A	SF	A	A	A	A	A	A	0 / 1	4–1	80%
French Open	1R	A	2R	1R	A	A	A	A	1R	A	0 / 4	1–4	20%
Wimbledon	A	A	1R	1R	A	A	A	NH	A	A	0 / 2	0–2	0%
US Open	A	A	2R	A	A	A	A	A	A	A	0 / 1	1–1	50%
Win–loss	0–1	0–0	2–3	4–3	0–0	0–0	0–0	0–0	0–1	0–0	0 / 8	6–8	46%
ATP Masters 1000
Indian Wells Masters	A	A	A	A	1R	1R	2R	NH	A		0 / 3	1–3	25%
Miami Masters	A	A	A	A	A	A	A	NH	A		0 / 0	0–0	–
Monte Carlo Masters	A	A	A	A	1R	1R	1R	NH	A		0 / 3	0–3	0%
Madrid Masters	A	A	A	A	A	1R	A	NH	A		0 / 1	0–1	0%
Rome Masters	A	A	A	A	A	1R	A	A	A		0 / 1	0–1	0%
Canada Masters	A	A	A	1R	2R	1R	1R	NH	A		0 / 4	1–4	20%
Cincinnati Masters	A	A	A	2R	A	1R	1R	A	A		0 / 3	1–3	25%
Shanghai Masters	A	A	A	A	2R	A	A	NH			0 / 1	1–0	100%
Paris Masters	A	A	1R	2R	2R	1R	A	A	A		0 / 4	2–3	40%
Win–loss	0–0	0–0	0–1	2–3	3–3	0–7	1–4	0–0	0–0	0–0	0 / 20	6–18	25%
Career statistics
Hard win–loss	0–0	0–0	1–3	7–5	6–9	5–9	4–6	0–0	1–2	0–2	24–36		42%
Clay win–loss	0–1	0–0	1–2	0–1	0–2	0–4	0–1	0–0	0–1	0–0	1–12		8%
Grass win–loss	0–0	0–0	0–1	0–2	0–2	1–2	1–2	0–0	0–0	0–0	2–9		18%
Overall win–loss	0–1	0–0	2–6	7–8	6–13	6–15	5–9	0–0	1–3	0–2	27–57		
Win %	0%	–	25%	47%	32%	29%	35%	–	25%		Career total: 33%		
Year-end ranking	–	813	263	88	159	203	212	226	495				

== ATP Tour career finals ==
=== Singles: 9 (5 titles, 4 runner-ups) ===
Legend Grand Slam tournaments (0–0) ATP World Tour Finals (0–0) ATP World Tour Masters 1000 (0–0) ATP World Tour 500 Series (1–1) ATP World Tour 250 Series (4–3)	Titles by surface Hard (3–3) Clay (1–1) Grass (1–0)	Titles by setting Outdoor (2–2) Indoor (3–2)

Result	W–L	Date	Tournament	Tier	Surface	Opponent	Score
Loss	0–1	Apr 2016	Romanian Open, Romania	250 Series	Clay	(Spain) Fernando Verdasco	3–6, 2–6
Win	1–1	Sep 2016	Moselle Open, France	250 Series	Hard (i)	(Austria) Dominic Thiem	7–6^{(7–5)}, 6–2
Loss	1–2	Feb 2017	Open 13, France	250 Series	Hard (i)	(France) Jo-Wilfried Tsonga	4–6, 4–6
Win	2–2	Apr 2017	Hungarian Open, Hungary	250 Series	Clay	(United Kingdom) Aljaž Bedene	6–3, 6–1
Win	3–2	Jun 2017	Stuttgart Open, Germany	250 Series	Grass	(Spain) Feliciano López	4–6, 7–6^{(7–5)}, 6–4
Win	4–2	Oct 2017	Vienna Open, Austria	500 Series	Hard (i)	(France) Jo-Wilfried Tsonga	6–1, 6–4
Win	5–2	Feb 2018	Open Sud de France, France	250 Series	Hard (i)	(France) Richard Gasquet	7–6^{(7–2)}, 6–4
Loss	5–3	Feb 2018	Open 13, France	250 Series	Hard (i)	(Russia) Karen Khachanov	5–7, 6–3, 5–7
Loss	5–4	Mar 2018	Dubai Tennis Championships, UAE	500 Series	Hard	(Spain) Roberto Bautista Agut	3–6, 4–6

== ATP Challenger and ITF Tour finals ==
=== Singles: 15 (6 titles, 9 runner-ups) ===
Legend (singles) ATP Challenger Tour (2–6) ITF Futures Tour (4–3)	Titles by surface Hard (3–6) Clay (3–3) Grass (0–0) Carpet (0–0)

Result	W–L	Date	Tournament	Tier	Surface	Opponent	Score
Loss	0–1	May 2012	Sweden F3, Båstad	Futures	Clay	(Finland) Timo Nieminen	6–2, 5–7, 2–6
Loss	0–2	Sep 2012	Serbia F14, Sokobanja	Futures	Clay	(Slovakia) Jozef Kovalík	3–6, 7–5, 4–6
Win	1–2	Nov 2012	Mexico F13, Mérida	Futures	Hard	(France) Mathias Bourgue	6–4, 6–1
Win	2–2	Nov 2012	Mexico F14, Mérida	Futures	Hard	(Canada) Filip Peliwo	6–3, 6–3
Loss	2–3	Mar 2013	Vietnam F1, Bạc Liêu City	Futures	Hard	(France) Laurent Recouderc	6–0, 4–6, 6–7^{(4–7)}
Win	3–3	Apr 2013	Vietnam F3, Ho Chi Minh City	Futures	Hard	(France) Mathias Bourgue	7–6^{(7–4)}, 6–2
Win	4–3	Jul 2013	Estonia F1, Tallinn	Futures	Clay	(Russia) Ivan Nedelko	6–2, 6–1
Loss	4–4	Sep 2014	Meknes, Morocco	Challenger	Clay	(Belgium) Kimmer Coppejans	6–4, 2–6, 2–6
Loss	4–5	Nov 2015	Mouilleron le Captif, France	Challenger	Hard (i)	(France) Benoît Paire	4–6, 6–1, 6–7^{(7–9)}
Win	5–5	May 2019	Bordeaux, France	Challenger	Clay	(Sweden) Mikael Ymer	6–3, 6–3
Loss	5–6	Sep 2021	Cassis, France	Challenger	Hard	(France) Benjamin Bonzi	6-7^{(4–7)}, 4–6
Loss	5–7	Jan 2024	Nonthaburi, Thailand	Challenger	Hard	(Monaco) Valentin Vacherot	2–3 ret.
Win	6–7	May 2024	Mathausen, Austria	Challenger	Clay	(Slovakia) Jozef Kovalik	6–3, 6–3
Loss	6–8	Sep 2024	Saint-Tropez, France	Challenger	Hard	(Netherlands) Gijs Brouwer	4–6, 6–7^{(2–7)}
Loss	6–9	Feb 2025	Lille, France	Challenger	Hard (i)	(France) Arthur Bouquier	3-6, 5–3, ret.

=== Doubles: 3 (3 runners-up) ===
Legend (doubles) ATP Challenger Tour (0–2) ITF Futures Tour (0–1)	Titles by surface Hard (0–0) Clay (0–3) Grass (0–0) Carpet (0–0)

Result	W–L	Date	Tournament	Tier	Surface	Partner	Opponent	Score
Loss	0–1	Jul 2012	France F11, Toulon	Futures	Clay	(France) Grégoire Barrère	(France) Olivier Patience (France) Nicolas Renavand	3–6, 6–4, [8–10]
Loss	0–2	May 2015	Bordeaux, France	Challenger	Clay	(Ukraine) Sergiy Stakhovsky	(Netherlands) Thiemo de Bakker (Netherlands) Robin Haase	3–6, 5–7
Loss	0–3	April 2022	Prague, Czech Republic	Challenger	Clay	(France) Tristan Lamasine	(Portugal) Francisco Cabral (Poland) Szymon Walków	2-6, 6-7^{(12–14)}

== Other finals ==
=== Team competitions finals: 2 (1 title, 1 runner-up) ===
Result	No.	Date	Tournament	Surface	Partner(s)	Opponents	Score
Win	1.	24–26 Nov 2017	Davis Cup, Lille, France	Hard (i)	(France) Jo-Wilfried Tsonga (France) Richard Gasquet (France) Pierre-Hugues Herbert	(Belgium) David Goffin (Belgium) Steve Darcis (Belgium) Ruben Bemelmans (Belgium) Joris De Loore	3–2
Loss	2.	23–25 Nov 2018	Davis Cup, Lille, France	Clay (i)	(France) Jérémy Chardy (France) Pierre-Hugues Herbert (France) Nicolas Mahut (France) Jo-Wilfried Tsonga	(Croatia) Marin Čilić (Croatia) Borna Ćorić (Croatia) Franko Škugor (Croatia) Mate Pavić (Croatia) Ivan Dodig	1–3

== Wins over top 10 players ==
=== Singles ===
Season	2016	...	2019	Total
Wins	5		1	6

#	Player	Rank	Event	Surface	Rd	Score	LPR
2016
1.	(Spain) David Ferrer	8	Miami, United States	Hard	3R	6–7^{(1–7)}, 7–6^{(7–4)}, 7–5	88
2.	(France) Richard Gasquet	10	Monte Carlo, Monaco	Clay	2R	4–6, 7–5, 6–1	82
3.	(Spain) David Ferrer	9	Rome, Italy	Clay	3R	6–4, 6–1	52
4.	(Spain) Rafael Nadal	5	US Open, New York, United States	Hard	4R	6–1, 2–6, 6–4, 3–6, 7–6^{(8–6)}	25
5.	(Austria) Dominic Thiem	10	Metz, France	Hard (i)	F	7–6^{(7–5)}, 6–2	18
2019
6.	(Russia) Karen Khachanov	9	Cincinnati, United States	Hard	3R	6–7^{(3–7)}, 6–4, 6–2	31

=== Doubles ===
Season	2016	2017	Total
Wins	2	1	3

#	Partner	Opponents	Rank	Event	Surface	Rd	Score	LPR
2016
1.	(France) Adrian Mannarino	(Italy) Simone Bolelli (Italy) Fabio Fognini	13; 10	Australian Open, Australia	Hard	2R	7–6^{(7–5)}, 6–4	270
2.	(France) Adrian Mannarino	(Netherlands) Jean-Julien Rojer (Romania) Horia Tecău	3; 2	Australian Open, Australia	Hard	QF	7–6^{(7–5)}, 6–7^{(2–7)}. 6–4	270
2017
3.	(Russia) Karen Khachanov	(United Kingdom) Jamie Murray (Brazil) Bruno Soares	9; 10	Vienna, Austria	Hard (i)	QF	2–6, 7–6^{(7–3)}, [10–7]	183
