= 2024 Upper Austria Open – Singles =

Singles
- 2024 Upper Austria Open

Final
- Champion: (France) Lucas Pouille
- Runner-up: (Slovakia) Jozef Kovalík
- Score: 6–3, 6–3

Events
Singles	Doubles
- Upper Austria Open

Hamad Medjedovic was the defending champion but chose not to defend his title.

Lucas Pouille won the title after defeating Jozef Kovalík 6–3, 6–3 in the final.

== Seeds ==
1. (Argentina) Francisco Comesaña (semifinals, retired)
2. (Argentina) Román Andrés Burruchaga (second round)
3. (Canada) Gabriel Diallo (first round, retired)
4. (Finland) Otto Virtanen (second round)
5. (Germany) Benjamin Hassan (first round, retired)
6. (Slovakia) Jozef Kovalík (final)
7. (France) Ugo Blanchet (second round)
8. (Japan) Sho Shimabukuro (first round, retired)

== Draw ==
Key

- Q = Qualifier
- WC = Wild card
- LL = Lucky loser
- Alt = Alternate
- ITF = ITF entry
- PR = Protected ranking
- SR = Special ranking
- SE = Special exempt
- JE = Junior exempt
- JR = Junior Accelerator Programme entrant
- CO = College Accelerator Programme entrant
- NG = Next Gen Accelerator Program entrant
- w/o = Walkover
- r = Retired
- d = Defaulted

=== Finals ===
Semifinals
1	(Argentina) Francisco Comesaña	6^{5}	1^{r}
(France) Lucas Pouille	7^{7}	3
Alt	(Bulgaria) Dimitar Kuzmanov	7^{12}	3	0
6	(Slovakia) Jozef Kovalík	6^{10}	6	6

Final
(France) Lucas Pouille	6	6
6	(Slovakia) Jozef Kovalík	3	3

=== Top half ===
First round
1	(Argentina) F Comesaña	6	6
(Belgium) J De Loore	3	3
WC	(Austria) S Kopp	2	3
(Argentina) JM Cerúndolo	6	6
(Austria) F Misolic	6	3	6
(Switzerland) M-A Hüsler	2	6	4
(France) M Martineau	3	6	2
7	(France) U Blanchet	6	4	6
4	(Finland) O Virtanen	6	7
LL	(Germany) S Fanselow	2	5
WC	(Austria) Sebastian Sorger	1	2
Q	(Germany) MH Rehberg	6	6
(France) L Pouille	6	3	6
(Austria) D Novak	3	6	4
(United Kingdom) J Choinski	6	2
5	(Germany) B Hassan	2	0^{r}

Second round
1	(Argentina) F Comesaña	6	6
(Argentina) JM Cerúndolo	1	2
(Austria) F Misolic	3	6	6
7	(France) U Blanchet	6	3	2
4	(Finland) O Virtanen	7^{7}	6^{5}	5
Q	(Germany) MH Rehberg	6^{4}	7^{7}	7
(France) L Pouille	7^{7}	6
(United Kingdom) J Choinski	6^{3}	3

Quarterfinals
1	(Argentina) F Comesaña	7	6
(Austria) F Misolic	5	4
Q	(Germany) MH Rehberg	2	3
(France) L Pouille	6	6

Semifinals
1	(Argentina) F Comesaña	6^{5}	1^{r}
(France) L Pouille	7^{7}	3

=== Bottom half ===
First round
8	(Japan) S Shimabukuro	7	1	1^{r}
(Spain) M Landaluce	5	6	2
Q	(Germany) M Rosenkranz	6^{1}	4
WC	(Austria) J Schwärzler	7^{7}	6
Alt	(Bulgaria) D Kuzmanov	6	6
Q	(Egypt) M Safwat	3	2
(Austria) L Neumayer	4	7	4
3	(Canada) G Diallo	6	5	2^{r}
6	(Slovakia) J Kovalík	6	7^{7}
(Lithuania) V Gaubas	0	6^{0}
(Brazil) G Heide	6	1	6
Q	(France) A Géa	3	6	3
Q	(Switzerland) J Kym	2	6	3
Q	(Austria) G Melzer	6	3	6
(Sweden) E Ymer	6	3	4
2	(Argentina) RA Burruchaga	3	6	6

Second round
(Spain) M Landaluce	4	2
WC	(Austria) J Schwärzler	6	6
Alt	(Bulgaria) D Kuzmanov	2	6	6
(Austria) L Neumayer	6	2	0
6	(Slovakia) J Kovalík	6	6
(Brazil) G Heide	2	1
Q	(Austria) G Melzer	6	6
2	(Argentina) RA Burruchaga	4	4

Quarterfinals
WC	(Austria) J Schwärzler	2	3
Alt	(Bulgaria) D Kuzmanov	6	6
6	(Slovakia) J Kovalík	7^{8}	6
Q	(Austria) G Melzer	6^{6}	3

Semifinals
Alt	(Bulgaria) D Kuzmanov	7^{12}	3	0
6	(Slovakia) J Kovalík	6^{10}	6	6
