= 2022 Upper Austria Open – Doubles =

Doubles
- 2022 Upper Austria Open

Final
- Champions: (Netherlands) Sander Arends (Netherlands) David Pel
- Runners-up: (Germany) Johannes Härteis (Lebanon) Benjamin Hassan
- Score: 6–4, 6–3

Events
Singles	Doubles
Upper Austria Open	· 2023 →

This was the first edition of the tournament.

Sander Arends and David Pel won the title after defeating Johannes Härteis and Benjamin Hassan 6–4, 6–3 in the final.

== Seeds ==
1. (Mexico) Hans Hach Verdugo / (Austria) Philipp Oswald (quarterfinals)
2. (Ukraine) Denys Molchanov / (United States) Jackson Withrow (first round)
3. (Serbia) Ivan Sabanov / (Serbia) Matej Sabanov (first round)
4. (United States) Hunter Reese / (Netherlands) Sem Verbeek (semifinals)

== Draw ==
=== Key ===
- Q = Qualifier
- WC = Wild card
- LL = Lucky loser
- Alt = Alternate
- ITF = ITF entry
- PR = Protected ranking
- SR = Special ranking
- SE = Special exempt
- JE = Junior exempt
- JR = Junior Accelerator Programme entrant
- CO = College Accelerator Programme entrant
- NG = Next Gen Accelerator Program entrant
- w/o = Walkover
- r = Retired
- d = Defaulted

First round
1	(Mexico) H Hach Verdugo (Austria) P Oswald	6	6^{7}	[10]
WC	(Austria) M Neuchrist (Austria) N Oberleitner	4	7^{9}	[5]
Alt	(Germany) J Härteis (Lebanon) B Hassan	7^{8}	7
(Italy) F Agamenone (Spain) S Martos Gornés	6^{6}	5
3	(Serbia) I Sabanov (Serbia) M Sabanov	5	5
(Czech Republic) Z Kolář (France) A Olivetti	7	7
(Bosnia and Herzegovina) D Džumhur (Bosnia and Herzegovina) N Fatić
(Austria) A Erler (Austria) L Miedler	w/o
(Romania) VV Cornea (Germany) F Fallert	5	6^{4}
(Germany) D Brown (Germany) D Masur	7	7^{7}
WC	(Austria) F Misolic (Austria) L Neumayer	2	1
4	(United States) H Reese (Netherlands) S Verbeek	6	6
(United States) J Cerretani (Australia) T Fancutt	w/o
(Croatia) B Gojo (Croatia) N Serdarušić
(Netherlands) S Arends (Netherlands) D Pel	7	3	[10]
2	(Ukraine) D Molchanov (United States) J Withrow	5	6	[7]

Quarterfinals
1	(Mexico) H Hach Verdugo (Austria) P Oswald	7^{10}	1	[8]
Alt	(Germany) J Härteis (Lebanon) B Hassan	6^{8}	6	[10]
(Czech Republic) Z Kolář (France) A Olivetti	4	6	[8]
(Austria) A Erler (Austria) L Miedler	6	2	[10]
(Germany) D Brown (Germany) D Masur	3	2
4	(United States) H Reese (Netherlands) S Verbeek	6	6
(United States) J Cerretani (Australia) T Fancutt	2	6	[4]
(Netherlands) S Arends (Netherlands) D Pel	6	3	[10]

Semifinals
Alt	(Germany) J Härteis (Lebanon) B Hassan	6	3	[11]
(Austria) A Erler (Austria) L Miedler	2	6	[9]
4	(United States) H Reese (Netherlands) S Verbeek	6	4	[8]
(Netherlands) S Arends (Netherlands) D Pel	4	6	[10]

Final
Alt	(Germany) J Härteis (Lebanon) B Hassan	4	3
(Netherlands) S Arends (Netherlands) D Pel	6	6
