= 2024 Upper Austria Open =

- Date: 6–12 May
- Edition: 3rd
- Surface: Clay
- Location: Mauthausen, Austria

Champions

Singles
- (France) Lucas Pouille

Doubles
- (Germany) Constantin Frantzen / (Germany) Hendrik Jebens
- Upper Austria Open

The 2024 Danube Upper Austria Open was a professional tennis tournament played on clay courts. It was the third edition of the tournament which was part of the 2024 ATP Challenger Tour. It took place in Mauthausen, Austria between 6 and 12 May 2024.

== Singles main-draw entrants ==
=== Seeds ===
Country	Player	Rank^{1}	Seed
ARG	Francisco Comesaña	96	1
ARG	Román Andrés Burruchaga	148	2
CAN	Gabriel Diallo	154	3
FIN	Otto Virtanen	158	4
GER	Benjamin Hassan	159	5
SVK	Jozef Kovalík	164	6
FRA	Ugo Blanchet	165	7
JPN	Sho Shimabukuro	171	8

- ^{1} Rankings as of 22 April 2024.

=== Other entrants ===
The following players received wildcards into the singles main draw:

- (Austria) Sandro Kopp
- (Austria) Joel Schwärzler
- (Austria) Sebastian Sorger

The following player received entry into the singles main draw as an alternate:

- (Bulgaria) Dimitar Kuzmanov

The following players received entry from the qualifying draw:

- (France) Arthur Géa
- (Switzerland) Jérôme Kym
- (Austria) Gerald Melzer
- (Germany) Max Hans Rehberg
- (Germany) Mats Rosenkranz
- (Egypt) Mohamed Safwat

The following player received entry as a lucky loser:

- (Germany) Sebastian Fanselow

== Champions ==
=== Singles ===
- (France) Lucas Pouille def. (Slovakia) Jozef Kovalík 6–3, 6–3.

=== Doubles ===
- (Germany) Constantin Frantzen / (Germany) Hendrik Jebens def. (United States) Ryan Seggerman / (United States) Patrik Trhac 6–4, 6–4.
