= 2023 Upper Austria Open =

- Date: 8–14 May
- Edition: 2nd
- Surface: Clay
- Location: Mauthausen, Austria

Champions

Singles
- (Serbia) Hamad Međedović

Doubles
- (Monaco) Romain Arneodo / (Austria) Sam Weissborn
- Upper Austria Open

The 2023 Danube Upper Austria Open was a professional tennis tournament played on clay courts. It was the second edition of the tournament which was part of the 2023 ATP Challenger Tour. It took place in Mauthausen, Austria between 8 and 14 May 2023.

== Singles main-draw entrants ==
=== Seeds ===
Country	Player	Rank^{1}	Seed
AUT	Dominic Thiem	93	1
FRA	Hugo Gaston	106	2
ARG	Facundo Bagnis	116	3
NED	Gijs Brouwer	122	4
AUT	Filip Misolic	126	5
AUT	Sebastian Ofner	130	6
SUI	Leandro Riedi	156	7
AUT	Dennis Novak	159	8

- ^{1} Rankings as of 24 April 2023.

=== Other entrants ===
The following players received wildcards into the singles main draw:

- (Austria) Sandro Kopp
- (Austria) Gerald Melzer
- (Austria) Lukas Neumayer

The following players received entry into the singles main draw as alternates:

- (France) Manuel Guinard
- (Bulgaria) Alexandar Lazarov
- (Australia) James McCabe
- (Germany) Louis Wessels

The following players received entry from the qualifying draw:

- (Bosnia and Herzegovina) Mirza Bašić
- (Romania) Marius Copil
- (Germany) Lucas Gerch
- (Germany) Hendrik Jebens
- (Austria) Matthias Ujvary
- (Switzerland) Damien Wenger

== Champions ==
=== Singles ===
- (Serbia) Hamad Međedović def. (Austria) Filip Misolic 6–2, 6–7^{(5–7)}, 6–4.

=== Doubles ===
- (Monaco) Romain Arneodo / (Austria) Sam Weissborn def. (Germany) Constantin Frantzen / (Germany) Hendrik Jebens 6–4, 6–2.
