= 2023 Upper Austria Open – Doubles =

Doubles
- 2023 Upper Austria Open

Final
- Champions: (Monaco) Romain Arneodo (Austria) Sam Weissborn
- Runners-up: (Germany) Constantin Frantzen (Germany) Hendrik Jebens
- Score: 6–4, 6–2

Events
Singles	Doubles
- Upper Austria Open

Sander Arends and David Pel were the defending champions but only Pel chose to defend his title, partnering Gijs Brouwer. Pel lost in the first round to Jérôme Kym and Joel Schwärzler.

Romain Arneodo and Sam Weissborn won the title after defeating Constantin Frantzen and Hendrik Jebens 6–4, 6–2 in the final.

== Seeds ==
1. (Monaco) Romain Arneodo / (Austria) Sam Weissborn (champions)
2. (Serbia) Nikola Ćaćić / (Kazakhstan) Aleksandr Nedovyesov (quarterfinals)
3. (United States) Robert Galloway / (Mexico) Miguel Ángel Reyes-Varela (quarterfinals)
4. (India) Sriram Balaji / (India) Jeevan Nedunchezhiyan (quarterfinals)

== Draw ==
Key

- Q = Qualifier
- WC = Wild card
- LL = Lucky loser
- Alt = Alternate
- ITF = ITF entry
- PR = Protected ranking
- SR = Special ranking
- SE = Special exempt
- JE = Junior exempt
- JR = Junior Accelerator Programme entrant
- CO = College Accelerator Programme entrant
- NG = Next Gen Accelerator Program entrant
- w/o = Walkover
- r = Retired
- d = Defaulted

First round
1	(Monaco) R Arneodo (Austria) S Weissborn	3	6	[10]
(Finland) P Niklas-Salminen (Netherlands) B Stevens	6	4	[1]
(Netherlands) G Brouwer (Netherlands) D Pel	6^{4}	6^{3}
WC	(Switzerland) J Kym (Austria) J Schwärzler	7^{7}	7^{7}
3	(United States) R Galloway (Mexico) MÁ Reyes-Varela	5	7	[10]
(Serbia) I Sabanov (Serbia) M Sabanov	7	5	[8]
(Australia) J McCabe (Austria) S Ofner	6	6
(Romania) VV Cornea (Venezuela) LD Martínez	2	4
(Italy) M Bortolotti (Spain) Í Cervantes	6	6
WC	(Austria) S Kopp (Austria) D Pichler	3	4
(Sweden) F Bergevi (New Zealand) A Sitak	3	4
4	(India) S Balaji (India) J Nedunchezhiyan	6	6
(Germany) C Frantzen (Germany) H Jebens	6	6
(Austria) M Neuchrist (Austria) N Oberleitner	3	4
(France) M Guinard (Croatia) N Serdarušić	3	3
2	(Serbia) N Ćaćić (Kazakhstan) A Nedovyesov	6	6

Quarterfinals
1	(Monaco) R Arneodo (Austria) S Weissborn	7^{7}	2	[10]
WC	(Switzerland) J Kym (Austria) J Schwärzler	6^{5}	6	[7]
3	(United States) R Galloway (Mexico) MÁ Reyes-Varela	3	6	[9]
(Australia) J McCabe (Austria) S Ofner	6	2	[11]
(Italy) M Bortolotti (Spain) Í Cervantes	6	6
4	(India) S Balaji (India) J Nedunchezhiyan	2	4
(Germany) C Frantzen (Germany) H Jebens	6	6
2	(Serbia) N Ćaćić (Kazakhstan) A Nedovyesov	3	2

Semifinals
1	(Monaco) R Arneodo (Austria) S Weissborn	w/o
(Australia) J McCabe (Austria) S Ofner
(Italy) M Bortolotti (Spain) Í Cervantes	5	6	[6]
(Germany) C Frantzen (Germany) H Jebens	7	1	[10]

Final
1	(Monaco) R Arneodo (Austria) S Weissborn	6	6
(Germany) C Frantzen (Germany) H Jebens	4	2
