= 2023 Upper Austria Open – Singles =

Singles
- 2023 Upper Austria Open

Final
- Champion: (Serbia) Hamad Međedović
- Runner-up: (Austria) Filip Misolic
- Score: 6–2, 6–7^{(5–7)}, 6–4

Events
Singles	Doubles
- Upper Austria Open

Jurij Rodionov was the defending champion but chose not to defend his title.

Hamad Međedović won the title after defeating Filip Misolic 6–2, 6–7^{(5–7)}, 6–4 in the final.

== Seeds ==
1. (Austria) Dominic Thiem (semifinals)
2. (France) Hugo Gaston (quarterfinals)
3. (Argentina) Facundo Bagnis (quarterfinals)
4. (Netherlands) Gijs Brouwer (first round)
5. (Austria) Filip Misolic (final)
6. (Austria) Sebastian Ofner (semifinals)
7. (Switzerland) Leandro Riedi (second round, retired)
8. (Austria) Dennis Novak (quarterfinals)

== Draw ==
Key

- Q = Qualifier
- WC = Wild card
- LL = Lucky loser
- Alt = Alternate
- ITF = ITF entry
- PR = Protected ranking
- SR = Special ranking
- SE = Special exempt
- JE = Junior exempt
- JR = Junior Accelerator Programme entrant
- CO = College Accelerator Programme entrant
- NG = Next Gen Accelerator Program entrant
- w/o = Walkover
- r = Retired
- d = Defaulted

=== Finals ===
Semifinals
1	(Austria) Dominic Thiem	6^{3}	2
(Serbia) Hamad Međedović	7^{7}	6
5	(Austria) Filip Misolic	7^{7}	6
6	(Austria) Sebastian Ofner	6^{1}	4

Final
(Serbia) Hamad Međedović	6	6^{5}	6
5	(Austria) Filip Misolic	2	7^{7}	4

=== Top half ===
First round
1	(Austria) D Thiem	6	6
Q	(Austria) Matthias Ujvary	4	2
(Argentina) F Delbonis	6	6^{6}	6
Alt	(France) M Guinard	2	7^{8}	2
(Croatia) D Prižmić	6	6^{5}	6
(Serbia) M Zekić	3	7^{7}	3
(Bulgaria) A Andreev	7^{7}	4	6^{6}
7	(Switzerland) L Riedi	6^{5}	6	7^{8}
4	(Netherlands) G Brouwer	4	6	3
(Switzerland) A Ritschard	6	3	6
Q	(Germany) Lucas Gerch	1	3
(Serbia) H Međedović	6	6
WC	(Austria) S Kopp	1	2
Alt	(Bulgaria) A Lazarov	6	3^{r}
(France) H Mayot	6	3	2
8	(Austria) D Novak	2	6	6

Second round
1	(Austria) D Thiem	6	6
(Argentina) F Delbonis	1	4
(Croatia) D Prižmić	7	4
7	(Switzerland) L Riedi	5	0^{r}
(Switzerland) A Ritschard	3	1
(Serbia) H Međedović	6	6
WC	(Austria) S Kopp	5	6	3
8	(Austria) D Novak	7	3	6

Quarterfinals
1	(Austria) D Thiem	6	6
(Croatia) D Prižmić	3	3
(Serbia) H Međedović	7	6
8	(Austria) D Novak	5	3

Semifinals
1	(Austria) D Thiem	6^{3}	2
(Serbia) H Međedović	7^{7}	6

=== Bottom half ===
First round
5	(Austria) F Misolic	4	6	6
(France) G Mpetshi Perricard	6	3	2
Q	(Romania) M Copil	6^{5}	6	6
Q	(Germany) H Jebens	7^{7}	3	4
WC	(Austria) G Melzer	7^{7}	1	6
Alt	(Australia) J McCabe	6^{1}	6	0
(Austria) M Neuchrist	1	1
3	(Argentina) F Bagnis	6	6
6	(Austria) S Ofner	6^{2}	6	7
Alt	(Germany) L Wessels	7^{7}	4	5
Q	(Switzerland) D Wenger	6	5	6
Q	(Bosnia and Herzegovina) M Bašić	4	7	3
WC	(Austria) L Neumayer	4	6	3
(Australia) D Sweeny	6	1	6
(France) G Blancaneaux	3	6^{7}
2	(France) H Gaston	6	7^{9}

Second round
5	(Austria) F Misolic	7	6
Q	(Romania) M Copil	5	3
WC	(Austria) G Melzer	4	6	3
3	(Argentina) F Bagnis	6	4	6
6	(Austria) S Ofner	6	7^{7}
Q	(Switzerland) D Wenger	2	6^{0}
(Australia) D Sweeny	4	5
2	(France) H Gaston	6	7

Quarterfinals
5	(Austria) F Misolic	3	6	6
3	(Argentina) F Bagnis	6	4	1
6	(Austria) S Ofner	3	6	7^{7}
2	(France) H Gaston	6	3	6^{4}

Semifinals
5	(Austria) F Misolic	7^{7}	6
6	(Austria) S Ofner	6^{1}	4
