= Hamad Medjedovic =

Serbian tennis player (born 2003)

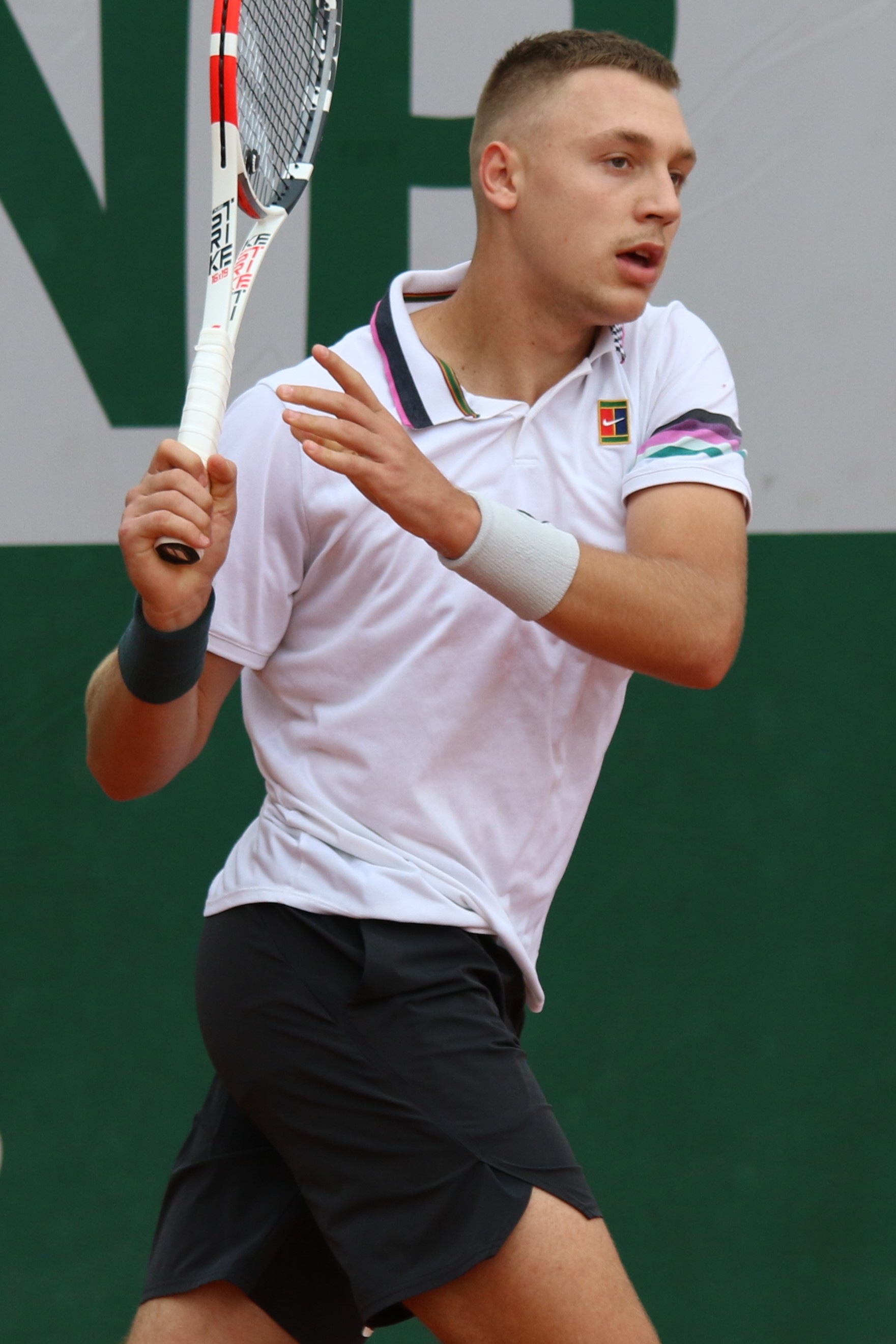
- Medjedovic at the 2023 French Open
- Full name: Hamad Međedović
- Country (sports): Serbia
- Residence: Belgrade, Serbia
- Born: 18 July 2003 (age 23) Novi Pazar, Serbia and Montenegro
- Height: 1.88 m (6 ft 2 in)
- Turned pro: 2021
- Plays: Right-handed (two-handed backhand)
- Coach: Jorge Aguirre (2025–); Viktor Troicki (2023–2024); Stéphane Robert (2022–2023), Ilija Bozoljac (2021–2022)
- Prize money: US$ 2,992,991

Singles
- Career record: 48–42 (at ATP Tour level, Grand Slam level, and in Davis Cup)
- Career titles: 0
- Highest ranking: No. 56 (18 May 2026)
- Current ranking: No. 80 (9 November 2026)

Grand Slam singles results
- Australian Open: 2R (2026)
- French Open: 3R (2025)
- Wimbledon: 1R (2023, 2025, 2026)
- US Open: 1R (2024, 2025, 2026)

Doubles
- Career record: 1–5 (at ATP Tour level, Grand Slam level, and in Davis Cup)
- Career titles: 0
- Highest ranking: No. 1,267 (24 May 2021)

Grand Slam doubles results
- US Open: 1R (2025)

Team competitions
- Davis Cup: 5–2 (Sin. 4–1, Dbs. 1–1)
- Last updated on: 8 June 2026.

Hamad Medjedovic (Note: (Serbian: Хамад Међедовић / Hamad Međedović; Serbian pronunciation: [xamad měːdʑědovitɕ]) (born 18 July 2003) is a Serbian professional tennis player. He has a career-high ATP singles ranking of world No. 56 achieved on 18 May 2026. He is currently the No. 3 singles player from Serbia.

Medjedovic won the 2023 NextGen Finals. He represents Serbia at the Davis Cup.

== Early life ==
Medjedovic was born in Novi Pazar, Serbia, at the time part of Serbia and Montenegro. He started taking tennis lessons in his early childhood, at a tennis facility next to his town.

== Professional career ==
=== Juniors ===
Medjedovic had good results as a Junior where he reached a junior combined ranking of world No. 9 on 4 January 2021.

=== 2021: ATP debut ===
Medjedovic made his ATP main draw debut at the 2021 Belgrade Open after receiving a wildcard for the singles and doubles main draws.

=== 2022: Maiden Challenger title ===
Medjedovic reached the final at the 2022 Platzmann-Sauerland Open as a qualifier, eliminating both fourth-seeded Marco Cecchinato and top seed Nicolás Jarry en route. He then defeated Zhang Zhizhen in less than an hour in the final, winning his maiden Challenger title.

=== 2023: First ATP semifinal, NextGen champion ===
In February, Medjedovic recorded his first ATP Tour win, when he made his debut in the Davis Cup by beating Viktor Durasovic in the tie against Norway which Serbia won 4:0.

In March, Medjedovic won his second Challenger title at the Kiskút Open after defeating Nino Serdarušić in the final in straight sets. With this win, he became the fourth Serbian teenager to win multiple Challenger titles, joining Novak Djokovic and Janko Tipsarević (with 3), and Miomir Kecmanović (with 2). As a result, he climbed into the top 200 at world No. 192 on 20 March 2023. In May, ranked No. 214, he moved close to 50 positions up in the rankings to a new career high into the top 170 following his third Challenger title at the 2023 Upper Austria Open where he defeated three Austrians including former world No. 3 and top seed Dominic Thiem in the semifinals and fifth seed Filip Misolic in the final. At 19 years and 9 months, he became the third Serbian teenager to win 3 titles in Challenger history, joining Djokovic and Tipsarevic.

In May, Medjedovic made his Grand Slam debut at the French Open where he qualified to the main draw with victories over Ivan Gakhov, Juan Manuel Cerúndolo, and Jesper de Jong, He lost in the first round to Marcos Giron.

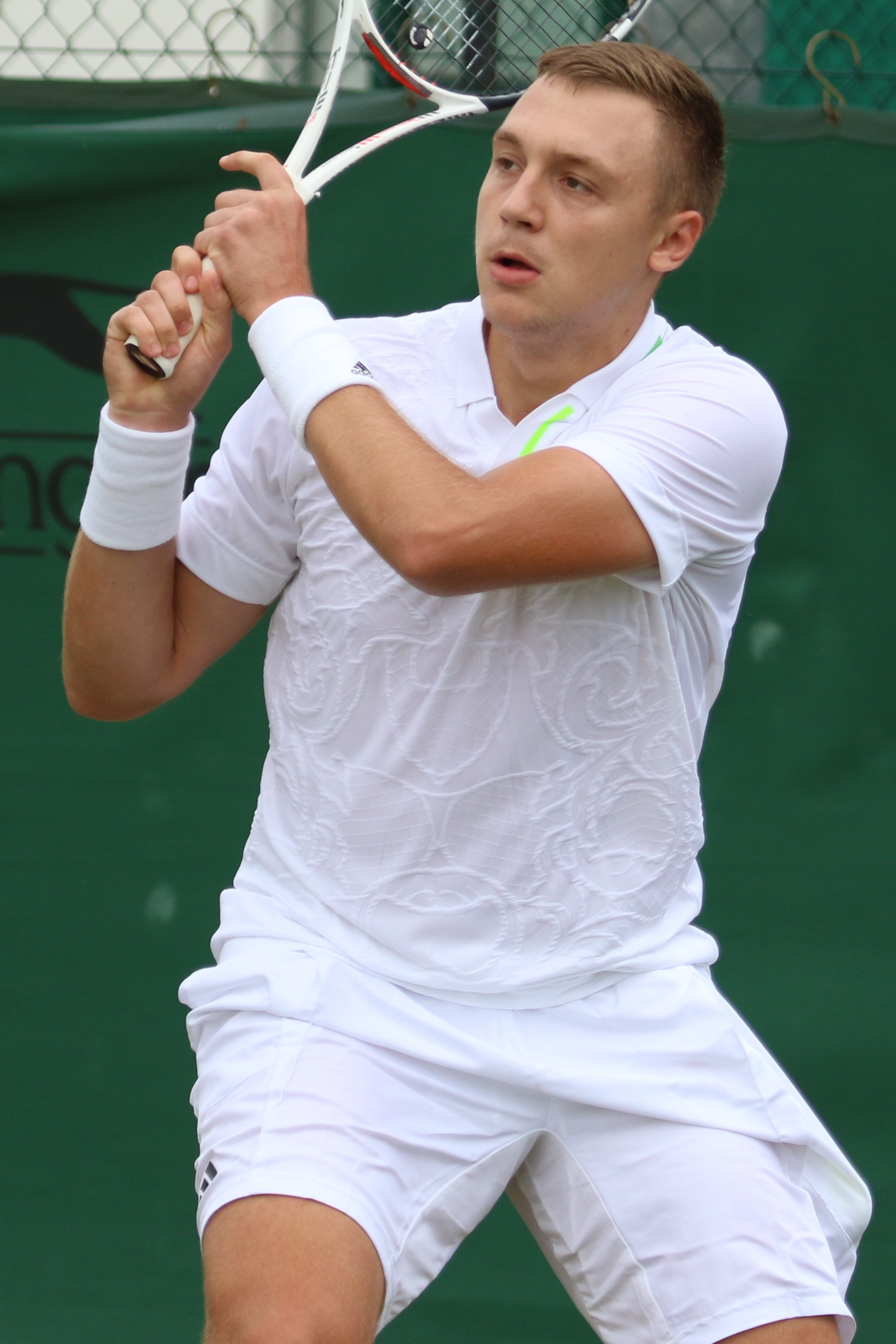
Hamad Medjedović during Wimbledon qualifying (2023)

In July, Medjedovic made his Wimbledon debut, where he qualified again. He lost to Christopher O'Connell in the first round of the main draw. Ranked No. 183, as a qualifier, he reached his first ATP semifinal at the Swiss Open Gstaad. He beat Zhang Zhizhen in the first round, Dominic Thiem in the second and fourth seed Yannick Hanfmann in the quarterfinals in straight sets. He lost to the eventual champion Pedro Cachin. In August, Medjedovic entered the US Open qualifying where he lost in the first round in three tight sets to Borna Gojo. In September, he won his fourth title on the ATP Challenger Tour in Mallorca, defeating Harold Mayot in the final. As a result, he moved into the top 125 on 11 September 2023.

Medjedovic was granted a wildcard for the Astana Open, where he reached the quarterfinals with wins over seventh seed Laslo Djere in the first round and wildcard Alexander Shevchenko in the second. Next he defeated fourth seed Jiří Lehečka in straight sets, to reach his second career semifinal, for the biggest win of his career thus far. In the semifinals, he lost to the fifth seed Sebastian Korda in three sets with three tiebreaks. In November, he qualified for the 2023 Next Generation ATP Finals and won the title, unbeaten in all five matches, defeating top seed Arthur Fils in the final, thus becoming the lowest-ranked champion in tournament history at world No. 110.

=== 2024: Italian third round, first ATP final ===
Medjedovic made his debut at a Masters 1000 at the 2024 Mutua Madrid Open after qualifying for the main draw and recorded his first win at this level over Aleksandar Kovacevic. At the next Masters, the Italian Open, he reached the third round for the first time at this level, also after qualifying, defeating Alexei Popyrin and 30th seed Alejandro Davidovich Fokina but lost to second seed Daniil Medvedev. He qualified for the main draw of the 2024 French Open, once again losing in the first round.

At the 2024 Belgrade Open where he received a wildcard, he reached his maiden final with wins over third seed Francisco Cerúndolo and compatriot Laslo Djere. Medjedovic lost the final to Denis Shapovalov.

=== 2025: ATP final, first top 10 win ===
Following lifting the trophy at the Oeiras Indoors Challenger level event, Medjedovic reached the top 100 in the singles rankings at world No. 98 on 13 January 2025.

In February, Medjedovic reached his second ATP final at 2025 Open 13 Provence in Marseille, France. In the final, he was beaten by the Frenchman Ugo Humbert, after beating world No. 8 Daniil Medvedev in the semifinals to record his first career Top 10 win. By getting to the final stage, Medjedovic reached his career-high ATP singles ranking of world No. 73 on 17 February 2025.

At the 2025 Qatar Open, he withdrew from his second round match after being injured during his match against No. 6 seed Stefanos Tsitsipas, despite endeavoring to win while injured over Tsitsipas.

On 25 August 2025, Medjedovic reached his career-high ATP singles ranking of world No. 57.

== Personal life ==
Medjedovic has a long friendship with tennis legend Novak Djokovic. He first met his countryman at age nine and first practiced with him at age 16, after which Djokovic began providing Medjedovic advice and financial support, covering all his tennis expenses.

== Performance timelines ==
Key
W	F	SF	QF	#R	RR	Q#	DNQ	A	NH

(W) winner; (F) finalist; (SF) semifinalist; (QF) quarterfinalist; (#R) rounds 4, 3, 2, 1; (RR) round-robin stage; (Q#) qualification round; (DNQ) did not qualify; (A) absent; (NH) not held; (SR) strike rate (events won / competed); (W–L) win–loss record.
To avoid confusion and double counting, these charts are updated at the conclusion of a tournament or when the player's participation has ended.

=== Singles ===
Tournament	2021	2022	2023	2024	2025	2026	SR	W–L	Win%
Grand Slam tournaments
Australian Open	A	A	A	Q2	A	2R	0 / 1	1–1	50%
French Open	A	A	1R	1R	3R	2R	0 / 4	3–4	43%
Wimbledon	A	A	1R	Q2	1R	1R	0 / 3	0–3	0%
US Open	A	A	Q1	1R	1R		0 / 2	0–2	0%
Win–loss	0–0	0–0	0–2	0–2	2–3	2–3	0 / 10	4–10	29%
National representation
Davis Cup	A	A	SF	WG1	WG1		0 / 1	3–1	75%
Summer Olympics	A	NH		A	NH		0 / 0	0–0	–
Win–loss	0–0	0–0	1–0	0–0	2–1	0–0	0 / 3	3–1	75%
ATP 1000 tournaments
Indian Wells Open	A	A	A	Q1	A	A	0 / 0	0–0	–
Miami Open	A	A	A	A	1R	A	0 / 1	0–1	0%
Monte-Carlo Masters	A	A	A	A	Q2	A	0 / 0	0–0	–
Madrid Open	A	A	A	2R	1R	A	0 / 2	1–2	33%
Italian Open	A	A	A	3R	1R	4R	0 / 3	5–3	63%
Canadian Open	A	A	A	A	A		0 / 0	0–0	–
Cincinnati Open	A	A	A	A	3R		0 / 1	2–1	67%
Shanghai Masters	NH		A	A	1R		0 / 1	0–1	0%
Paris Masters	A	A	A	A	Q1		0 / 0	0–0	–
Win–loss	0–0	0–0	0–0	3–2	2–5	3–1	0 / 8	8–8	50%
Career statistics
	2021	2022	2023	2024	2025	2026	SR	W–L	Win%
Tournaments	1	2	8	8	16	10	Career total: 45		
Titles	0	0	0	0	0	0	Career total: 0		
Finals	0	0	0	1	1	0	Career total: 2		
Overall win–loss	0–1	0–2	12–7	9–8	17–16	11–10	0 / 45	49–44	53%
Win %	0%	0%	63%	53%	52%	52%	53%		
Year-end ranking (Note: 2019: ATP ranking–1581 2020: ATP ranking–1354)	669	255	113	114	83		$2,733,720		

== ATP Tour finals ==
=== Singles: 2 (2 runner-ups) ===
Legend Grand Slam (–) ATP 1000 (–) ATP 500 (–) ATP 250 (0–2)	Finals by surface Hard (0–2) Clay (–) Grass (–)	Finals by setting Outdoor (–) Indoor (0–2)

Result	W–L	Date	Tournament	Tier	Surface	Opponent	Score
Loss	0–1	Nov 2024	Belgrade Open, Serbia	ATP 250	Hard (i)	(Canada) Denis Shapovalov	4–6, 4–6
Loss	0–2	Feb 2025	Open 13, France	ATP 250	Hard (i)	(France) Ugo Humbert	6–7^{(4–7)}, 4–6

== ATP Next Generation finals ==
=== Singles: 1 (title) ===
Result	Date	Tournament	Surface	Opponent	Score
Win	Dec 2023	Next Generation ATP Finals, Saudi Arabia	Hard (i)	(France) Arthur Fils	3–4^{(6–8)}, 4–1, 4–2, 3–4^{(9–11)}, 4–1

== ATP Challenger Tour finals ==
=== Singles: 7 (6 titles, 1 runner-up) ===
Finals by surface
Hard (2–1)
Clay (4–0)

Result	W–L	Date	Tournament	Surface	Opponent	Score
Win	1–0	Jul 2022	Platzmann-Sauerland Open, Germany	Clay	(China) Zhang Zhizhen	6–1, 6–2
Win	2–0	Mar 2023	Kiskút Open, Hungary	Clay	(Croatia) Nino Serdarušić	6–4, 6–3
Win	3–0	May 2023	Upper Austria Open, Austria	Clay	(Austria) Filip Misolic	6–2, 6–7^{(5–7)}, 6–4
Win	4–0	Sep 2023	Rafa Nadal Open, Spain	Hard	(France) Harold Mayot	6–2, 4–6, 6–2
Loss	4–1	Sep 2024	Istanbul Challenger, Turkey	Hard	(Bosnia and Herzegovina) Damir Džumhur	4–6, 2–6
Win	5–1	Jan 2025	Oeiras Indoors, Portugal	Hard (i)	(Canada) Liam Draxl	6–1, 6–3
Win	6–1	Mar 2026	Napoli Tennis Cup, Italy	Clay	(Germany) Daniel Altmaier	6–2, 6–4

== ITF World Tennis Tour finals ==
=== Singles: 3 (3 titles) ===
Finals by surface
Hard (–)
Clay (3–0)

Result	W–L	Date	Tournament	Surface	Opponent	Score
Win	1–0	Apr 2022	M15 Antalya, Turkey	Clay	(Germany) Timo Stodder	6–0, 6–1
Win	2–0	Apr 2022	M15 Antalya, Turkey	Clay	(France) Valentin Royer	6–3, 6–2
Win	3–0	May 2022	M25 Ulcinj, Montenegro	Clay	(Spain) Àlex Martí Pujolràs	6–1, 6–2

=== Doubles: 1 (title) ===
Result	W–L	Date	Tournament	Surface	Partner	Opponents	Score
Win	1–0	May 2021	M15 Prijedor, Bosnia and Herzegovina	Clay	(Serbia) Marko Tepavac	(North Macedonia) Stefan Micov (Croatia) Alen Rogić Hadžalić	6–1, 6–4

== Wins against top-10 players ==
- Medjedovic has a 2–6 (25%) record against players who were, at the time the match was played, ranked in the top 10.

Season	2024	2025	2026	Total
Wins	0	1	1	2

#	Player	Rk	Event	Surface	Rd	Score	Rk	Ref
2025
1.	Daniil Medvedev	8	Open 13, France	Hard (i)	SF	6–3, 6–2	96	
2026
2.	(Australia) Alex de Minaur	7	Barcelona Open, Spain	Clay	2R	6–3, 6–4	88	

- Key: (Rk) first use, opponent rank; (Rd) round; (Rk) 2nd use, player rank; (Ref) reference; (F) final; (SF) semifinal; (QF) quarterfinal; (#R) rounds 4, 3, 2, 1; (RR) round-robin stage; (Q#) qualifying rounds or stages (3), 2, 1.

*As of 15 April 2026

== See also ==
- Serbia Davis Cup team
- List of Serbia Davis Cup team representatives
- Next Generation ATP Finals
- Sport in Serbia
