= Jozef Kovalík =

Slovak tennis player

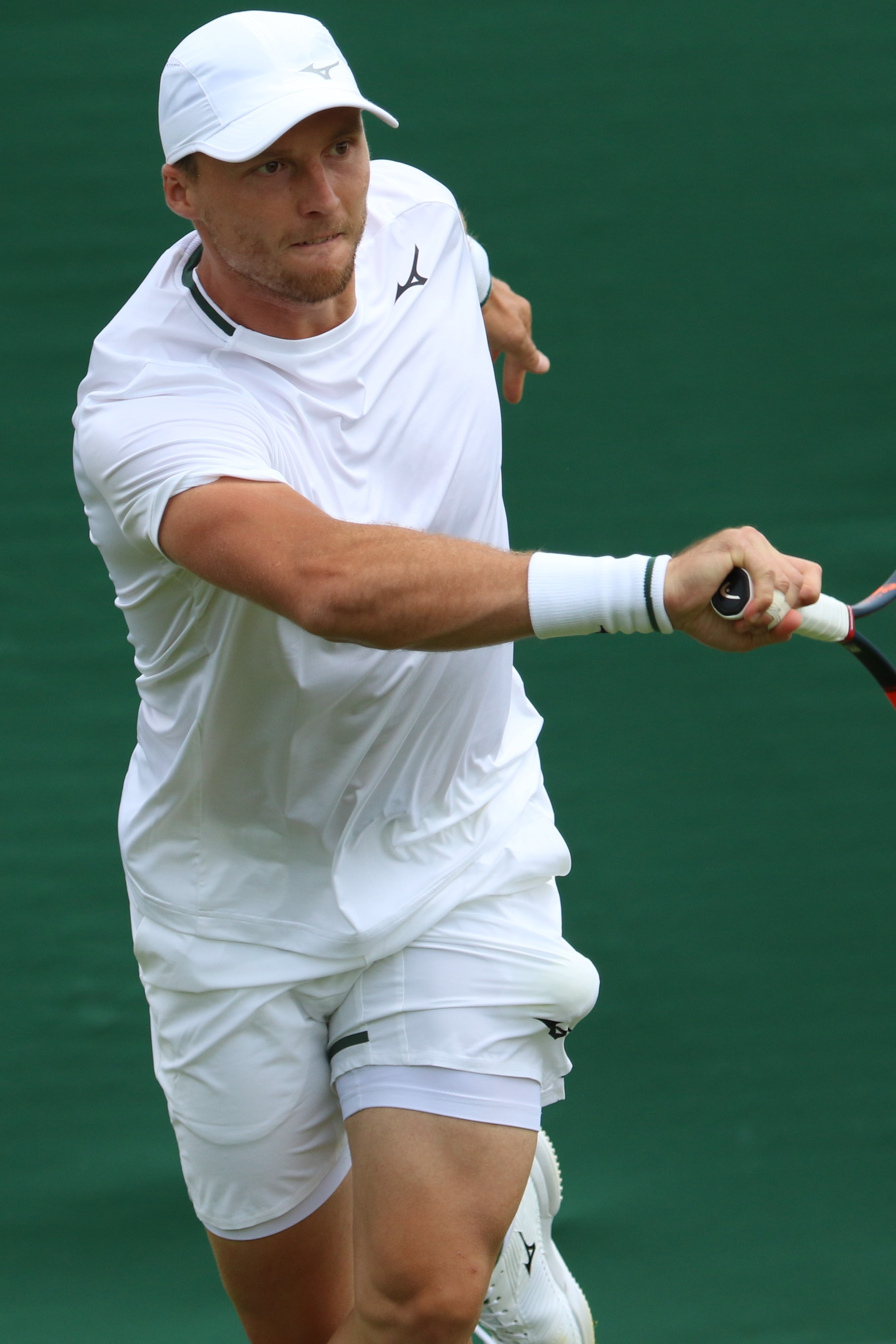
- Kovalík at the 2023 Wimbledon Championships
- Country (sports): Slovakia
- Residence: Bratislava, Slovakia
- Born: 4 November 1992 (age 33) Bratislava, Czechoslovakia
- Height: 1.83 m (6 ft 0 in)
- Turned pro: 2010
- Plays: Right-handed (two-handed backhand)
- Prize money: US $2,292,471

Singles
- Career record: 29–54
- Career titles: 0
- Highest ranking: No. 80 (22 October 2018)
- Current ranking: No. 793 (22 June 2026)

Grand Slam singles results
- Australian Open: 1R (2016, 2020)
- French Open: 3R (2024)
- Wimbledon: 1R (2019)
- US Open: 1R (2016, 2019, 2020)

Doubles
- Career record: 2–6
- Career titles: 0
- Highest ranking: No. 245 (2 April 2018)
- Current ranking: No. 1,298 (22 June 2026)

Grand Slam doubles results
- US Open: 2R (2019)
- Last updated on: 22 June 2026.

Jozef Kovalík (Slovak pronunciation: [ˈjɔzef ˈkɔʋaliːk]; born 4 November 1992) is a Slovak professional tennis player who competes on the ATP Challenger Tour. He has a career-high ATP singles ranking of world No. 80 and a doubles ranking of No. 245 reached in 2018.

== Career ==
=== 2010–2014: First Challenger title ===
Kovalík together with Filip Horanský won bronze medal in doubles at 2010 Summer Youth Olympics.

He won his first Challenger title as a wildcard on 17 August 2014 in Meerbusch, Germany, after defeating second seed Andrey Kuznetsov. He became the fourth player to win an ATP Challenger title while ranked outside the top 300.

=== 2016: ATP, Masters & Grand Slam debuts ===
He played his first match at ATP level on 5 January 2016 in Chennai, where he lost in the first round. He played his first match at a Grand Slam at the 2016 Australian Open, where he lost to fellow qualifier Marco Trungelliti in the first round.

At the 2016 BNP Paribas Open Kovalík won his first match at ATP level, defeating another qualifier Pierre-Hugues Herbert in the first round. He lost in two tight tie-breaks in the subsequent round, to fellow up-and-coming talent Dominic Thiem. Despite the loss his tennis was of an extremely high quality as he was able to win cheap points off his first serve, utilised an effective kicking second serve, and consistently hit his groundstrokes with great accuracy, power and depth. In addition he remained mentally composed on key points and played intelligent tennis throughout. During the match he was watched by fellow Slovak and coach of Novak Djokovic, Marián Vajda.

Kovalík won the 2016 Capri Watch Cup, his second title on the ATP Challenger Tour.

=== 2017–2020: Roland Garros, Wimbledon & Top 100 debuts ===
At the 2018 Sofia Open he had his best ATP tournament, reaching the semifinals and losing to Marius Copil in straight sets, 6–4, 6–2. Kovalík reached another ATP level semifinal at 2018 German Open in Hamburg, where he lost to the defending champion Leonardo Mayer. After the tournament, Kovalík made his Top 100 debut on 30 July 2018.

=== 2024: Challenger titles, first Major wins, back to top 125 ===
He won his first Challenger title of the season and first since 2022 in Zadar, Croatia defeating Adrian Andreev in the final. Following a third final showing for the season at the 2024 Upper Austria Open in Mauthausen, where he lost to Lucas Pouille, Kovalik returned in the top 150 in the rankings on 20 May 2024. At 31 years old, he entered the main draw of the 2024 French Open as a lucky loser, after more than three years of absence at the Grand Slam level and recorded his first Major wins over Marcos Giron and 18th seed Karen Khachanov. As a result, he returned to No. 119 on 10 June 2024 and to No. 102 a month later on 15 July 2024.

== Performance timelines ==
Key
W	F	SF	QF	#R	RR	Q#	P#	DNQ	A	Z#	PO	G	S	B	NMS	NTI	P	NH

(W) winner; (F) finalist; (SF) semifinalist; (QF) quarterfinalist; (#R) rounds 4, 3, 2, 1; (RR) round-robin stage; (Q#) qualification round; (P#) preliminary round; (DNQ) did not qualify; (A) absent; (Z#) Davis/Fed Cup Zonal Group (with number indication) or (PO) play-off; (G) gold, (S) silver or (B) bronze Olympic/Paralympic medal; (NMS) not a Masters tournament; (NTI) not a Tier I tournament; (P) postponed; (NH) not held; (SR) strike rate (events won / competed); (W–L) win–loss record.
To avoid confusion and double counting, these charts are updated at the conclusion of a tournament or when the player's participation has ended.

=== Singles ===
Current through the 2024 French Open.

Tournament	2013	2014	2015	2016	2017	2018	2019	2020	2021	2022	2023	2024	2025	SR	W–L
Grand Slam tournaments
Australian Open	A	A	Q2	1R	Q1	Q2	A	1R	Q1	Q1	Q1	Q1	Q3	0 / 2	0–2
French Open	Q2	A	A	Q1	1R	1R	1R	Q1	Q3	Q1	Q1	3R	Q1	0 / 4	2–4
Wimbledon	Q1	A	Q1	Q3	Q2	Q1	1R	NH	Q1	Q1	Q1	Q1	Q2	0 / 1	0–1
US Open	A	A	Q1	1R	Q1	Q1	1R	1R	A	Q2	Q1	Q1	A	0 / 3	0–3
Win–loss	0–0	0–0	0–0	0–2	0–1	0–1	0–3	0–2	0–0	0–0	0–0	2–1	0–0	0 / 10	2–10
ATP World Tour Masters 1000
Indian Wells Masters	A	A	A	2R	Q1	A	Q1	NH	A	A	A	A	Q1	0 / 1	1–1
Miami Open	A	A	A	Q1	Q1	A	A	NH	A	A	A	A	A	0 / 0	0–0
Monte-Carlo Masters	A	A	A	A	Q1	A	A	NH	A	A	A	A	A	0 / 0	0–0
Madrid Open	A	A	A	A	A	A	A	NH	A	A	Q1	A	A	0 / 0	0–0
Italian Open	A	A	A	A	A	A	A	Q3	Q1	A	Q1	A	A	0 / 0	0–0
Canadian Open	A	A	A	A	A	A	A	NH	A	A	A	A	A	0 / 0	0–0
Cincinnati Masters	A	A	A	A	A	Q1	A	A	A	A	A	A	A	0 / 0	0–0
Shanghai Masters	A	A	A	A	A	A	A	NH			A	A	A	0 / 0	0–0
Paris Masters	A	A	A	A	A	A	A	A	A	A	A	A		0 / 0	0–0
Win–loss	0–0	0–0	0–0	1–1	0–0	0–0	0–0	0–0	0–0	0–0	0–0	0–0	0–0	0 / 1	1–1
National representation
Davis Cup	A	A	A	PO	Z1	Z1	A	PO						0 / 0	2–4
Career statistics
	2013	2014	2015	2016	2017	2018	2019	2020	2021	2022	2023	2024	2025	Career	
Tournaments	0	0	0	9	6	6	9	6	6	3	4	1	0	50	
Overall win–loss	0–0	0–0	0–0	4–9	3–6	7–6	1–9	1–6	6–6	1–3	3–4	3–4	0–1	29–54	
Year-end ranking	339	202	259	117	165	85	139	131	148	137	228	125		34%	

=== Doubles ===
Current through the 2022 Melbourne Summer Set 1.

Tournament	2018	2019	2020	2021	2022	SR	W–L
Grand Slam tournaments
Australian Open	A	A	A	A	A	0 / 0	0–0
French Open	A	A	A	A	A	0 / 0	0–0
Wimbledon	A	A	NH	A	A	0 / 0	0–0
US Open	A	2R	A	A	A	0 / 1	1–1
Win–loss	0–0	1–1	0–0	0–0	0–0	0 / 1	1–1
Career statistics
	2018	2019	2020	2021	2022	Career	
Tournaments	1	2	0	0	1	4	
Titles / Finals	0 / 0	0 / 0	0 / 0	0 / 0	0 / 0	0 / 0	
Overall win–loss	0–1	1–2	0–0	0–0	0–1	1–4	
Year-end ranking	332	392	439	1009		20%	

== ATP Challenger and ITF Tour finals ==
=== Singles 31: (19–12) ===
Legend (singles) ATP Challenger Tour (9–8) ITF Futures Tour (9–4)	Titles by surface Hard (1–3) Clay (17–9)

Result	W–L	Date	Tournament	Tier	Surface	Opponent	Score
Loss	0–1	Apr 2011	Turkey F14, Antalya	Futures	Hard	(Spain) Arnau Brugués Davi	5–7, 2–6
Win	1–1	Jun 2011	Bosnia and Herzegovina F5, Kiseljak	Futures	Clay	(Bosnia and Herzegovina) Aldin Šetkić	6–3, 6–4
Loss	1–2	Jul 2011	Estonia F2, Kuressaare	Futures	Clay	(Chile) Hans Podlipnik Castillo	6–1, 2–6, 0–6
Win	2–2	Aug 2011	Slovakia F2, Tatranska Lomnica	Futures	Clay	(Czech Republic) Daniel Lustig	6–2, 4–6, 6–3
Loss	2–3	Jan 2012	Israel F2, Eilat	Futures	Hard	(United Kingdom) Daniel Smethurst	4–6, 2–6
Win	3–3	Jul 2012	Italy F15, Viterbo	Futures	Clay	(Italy) Riccardo Bellotti	6–2, 4–6, 6–2
Win	4–3	Sep 2012	Italy F25, Trieste	Futures	Clay	(Switzerland) Sandro Ehrat	7–6^{(7–2)}, 6–4
Win	5–3	Sep 2012	Serbia F12, Subotica	Futures	Clay	(Serbia) Laslo Djere	3–6, 6–0, 6–3
Win	6–3	Sep 2012	Serbia F14, Sokobanja	Futures	Clay	(France) Lucas Pouille	6–3, 5–7, 6–4
Loss	6–4	Apr 2013	Itajaí, Brasil	Challenger	Clay	(Brazil) Rogério Dutra da Silva	6–4, 3–6, 1–6
Loss	6–5	Feb 2014	Turkey F3, Antalya	Futures	Hard	(Ukraine) Artem Smirnov	6–7^{(4–7)}, 6–1, 4–6
Win	7–5	Mar 2014	Greece F1, Heraklion	Futures	Hard	(Czech Republic) Jan Hernych	6–3, 7–6^{(8–6)}
Win	8–5	Apr 2014	Greece F4, Heraklion	Futures	Hard	(Serbia) Dejan Katic	6–0, 6–2
Win	9–5	Jun 2014	Slovenia F2, Maribor	Futures	Clay	(Belgium) Julien Cagnina	7–6^{(7–2)}, 6–1
Win	10–5	Aug 2014	Meerbusch, Germany	Challenger	Clay	(Russia) Andrey Kuznetsov	6–1, 6–4
Loss	10–6	Jun 2015	Mestre, Italy	Challenger	Clay	(Argentina) Máximo González	1–6, 3–6
Win	11–6	Apr 2016	Napoli, Italy	Challenger	Clay	(Belgium) Arthur De Greef	6–3, 6–2
Loss	11–7	May 2017	Rome, Italy	Challenger	Clay	(Italy) Marco Cecchinato	4–6, 4–6
Loss	11–8	Oct 2017	Lima, Perù	Challenger	Clay	(Austria) Gerald Melzer	5–7, 6–7^{(4–7)}
Win	12–8	Jun 2018	Poprad, Slovakia	Challenger	Clay	(Belgium) Arthur De Greef	6–4, 6–0
Loss	12–9	Oct 2018	Braunschweig, Germany	Challenger	Clay	(Germany) Yannick Hanfmann	2–6, 6–3, 3–6
Win	13–9	Aug 2019	Szczecin, Poland	Challenger	Clay	(Argentina) Guido Andreozzi	6–7^{(5–7)}, 6–2, 6–4
Loss	13–10	Oct 2019	Barcelona, Spain	Challenger	Clay	(Italy) Salvatore Caruso	4–6, 2–6
Win	14–10	Nov 2019	Maia, Portugal	Challenger	Clay	(France) Constant Lestienne	6–0, 6–4
Win	15–10	Sep 2022	Tulln an der Donau, Austria	Challenger	Clay	(Netherlands) Jelle Sels	7–6^{(8–6)}, 7–6^{(7–3)}
Loss	15–11	Oct 2022	Parma, Italy	Challenger	Clay	(Kazakhstan) Timofey Skatov	5–7, 7–6^{(7–2)}, 4–6
Win	16–11	Mar 2024	Zadar, Croatia	Challenger	Clay	(Bulgaria) Adrian Andreev	6–4, 6–2
Win	17–11	Apr 2024	Split, Croatia	Challenger	Clay	(Hungary) Zsombor Piros	6–4, 5–7, 7–5
Loss	17–12	May 2024	Mauthausen, Austria	Challenger	Clay	(France) Lucas Pouille	3–6, 3–6
Win	18–12	Jul 2024	Karlsruhe, Germany	Challenger	Clay	(Argentina) Camilo Ugo Carabelli	6–3, 7–6^{(7–2)}

=== Doubles ===
Outcome	No.	Date	Tournament	Surface	Partner	Opponents	Score
Loss	1.	8 January 2012	São Paulo	Hard	(Brazil) José Pereira	(Brazil) Fernando Romboli (Brazil) Júlio Silva	7–5, 6–2
Loss	2.	9 April 2017	Sophia Antipolis	Clay	(Belarus) Uladzimir Ignatik	(France) Tristan Lamasine (Croatia) Franko Škugor	2–6, 2–6
Loss	3.	23 June 2017	Scheveningen	Clay	(Greece) Stefanos Tsitsipas	(Belgium) Sander Gillé (Belgium) Joran Vliegen	2–6, 6–4, [10–12]
Win	4.	30 September 2017	Rome	Clay	(Slovakia) Martin Kližan	(Belgium) Sander Gillé (Belgium) Joran Vliegen	6–3, 7–6^{(7–5)}
Loss	5.	31 March 2018	Marbella	Clay	(Slovakia) Martin Kližan	(Argentina) Guido Andreozzi (Uruguay) Ariel Behar	3–6, 4–6

== Wins over top 10 players ==
- Kovalík's match record against players who were, at the time the match was played, ranked in the top 10.

Season	2017	Total
Wins	1	1

#	Player	Rank	Event	Surface	Rd	Score
2017
1.	(Croatia) Marin Čilić	6	Chennai Open, India	Hard	2R	7–6^{(7–5)}, 5–7, 7–5
