= Nico Hipfl =

Austrian tennis player

- Country (sports): Austria
- Born: 3 April 2006 (age 20) Wels, Austria
- Height: 1.91 m (6 ft 3 in)
- Plays: Right-handed (two-handed backhand)
- Coach: Werner Hipfl, Markus Hipfl
- Prize money: US $42,362

Singles
- Career record: 0–0 (at ATP Tour level, Grand Slam level, and in Davis Cup)
- Career titles: 0
- Highest ranking: No. 701 (16 November 2026)
- Current ranking: No. 701 (16 November 2026)

Doubles
- Career record: 0–2 (at ATP Tour level, Grand Slam level, and in Davis Cup)
- Career titles: 1 Challenger, 1 ITF
- Highest ranking: No. 377 (5 May 2025)
- Current ranking: No. 543 (16 November 2026)
- Last updated on: 16 November 2026.

Nico Hipfl (born 3 April 2006) is an Austrian tennis player. He has a career high ATP doubles ranking of No. 377 achieved on 5 May 2025 and a singles ranking of No. 701 achieved on 16 November 2026.

== Personal life ==
He is the nephew of tennis coach and former professional player Markus Hipfl, who is also his coach. He is a member of the Kitzbüheler Tennisclub (KTC).

== Career ==
Hipfl won his maiden ATP Challenger doubles title at the 2025 Upper Austria Open.

He received wildcards for the singles qualifying competition at the 2026 Generali Open Kitzbühel, and for the doubles main draw with Sandro Kopp.
