= Upper Austria Open =

Danube Upper Austria Open
- 2026 Upper Austria Open

ATP Challenger Tour
- Event name: Danube Upper Austria Open powered by SKE
- Location: Mauthausen, Austria
- Venue: TC Union Mauthausen
- Category: ATP Challenger Tour 100
- Surface: Clay
- Prize money: €160,680 (2026), 145,250 (2025)
- Website: Official Website

The Danube Upper Austria Open powered by SKE is a professional tennis tournament played on clay courts. It is currently part of the Association of Tennis Professionals (ATP) Challenger Tour. It has been held in Mauthausen, Austria since 2022.

== Past finals ==
=== Singles ===
| Year | Champion | Runner-up | Score |
|---|---|---|---|
| 2026 | Roman Safiullin | (Portugal) Jaime Faria | 4–6, 6–4, 7–6^{(7–4)} |
| 2025 | (Chile) Cristian Garín | (Chile) Tomás Barrios Vera | 3–6, 6–1, 6–4 |
| 2024 | (France) Lucas Pouille | (Slovakia) Jozef Kovalík | 6–3, 6–3 |
| 2023 | (Serbia) Hamad Međedović | (Austria) Filip Misolic | 6–2, 6–7^{(5–7)}, 6–4 |
| 2022 | (Austria) Jurij Rodionov | (Czech Republic) Jiří Lehečka | 6–4, 6–4 |

=== Doubles ===
| Year | Champions | Runners-up | Score |
|---|---|---|---|
| 2026 | Ivan Liutarevich (Poland) Filip Pieczonka | (Spain) Àlex Martínez (Spain) Bruno Pujol Navarro | 6–3, 3–6, [12–10] |
| 2025 | (Austria) Nico Hipfl (Switzerland) Jérôme Kym | (United States) Ryan Seggerman (United Kingdom) David Stevenson | 7–5, 3–6, [10–2] |
| 2024 | (Germany) Constantin Frantzen (Germany) Hendrik Jebens | (United States) Ryan Seggerman (United States) Patrik Trhac | 6–4, 6–4 |
| 2023 | (Monaco) Romain Arneodo (Austria) Sam Weissborn | (Germany) Constantin Frantzen (Germany) Hendrik Jebens | 6–4, 6–2 |
| 2022 | (Netherlands) Sander Arends (Netherlands) David Pel | (Germany) Johannes Härteis (Lebanon) Benjamin Hassan | 6–4, 6–3 |
