= Jérôme Kym =

Swiss tennis player

- Kym at the 2026 Swiss Indoors
- Country (sports): Switzerland
- Residence: Möhlin, Switzerland
- Born: 12 February 2003 (age 23) Rheinfelden, Switzerland
- Height: 1.98 m (6 ft 6 in)
- Turned pro: 2019
- Plays: Right-handed (two-handed backhand)
- Coach: Roman Vögeli, Yannick Penkner
- Prize money: US $1,045,218

Singles
- Career record: 10–7
- Career titles: 0
- Highest ranking: No. 123 (19 May 2025)
- Current ranking: No. 143 (9 November 2026)

Grand Slam singles results
- Australian Open: Q2 (2025, 2026)
- French Open: Q1 (2025, 2026)
- Wimbledon: Q3 (2026)
- US Open: 3R (2025)

Doubles
- Career record: 3–5
- Career titles: 0
- Highest ranking: No. 192 (19 May 2025)
- Current ranking: No. 1,117 (9 November 2026)
- Last updated on: 14 November 2026.

Jérôme Cyrill Kym (born 12 February 2003) is a Swiss professional tennis player. He has a career-high ATP singles ranking of No. 123 and a doubles ranking of No. 192, both achieved on 19 May 2025. He is currently the No. 1 ATP player from Switzerland.

Kym represents Switzerland at the Davis Cup, where he has a W/L record of 3–2.

== Junior career ==
Kym had successful results on the ITF junior circuit, maintaining a 93–27 singles win-loss record. He reached an ITF junior combined ranking of world No. 5 on 11 October 2021.

== Professional career ==
=== 2019: Davis Cup debut ===
In February 2019, partnering Henri Laaksonen, they defeated the Russian duo of Evgeny Donskoy and Andrey Rublev in his first doubles Davis Cup tie.

=== 2024-2025: ATP, Top 125, Major debut and third round ===
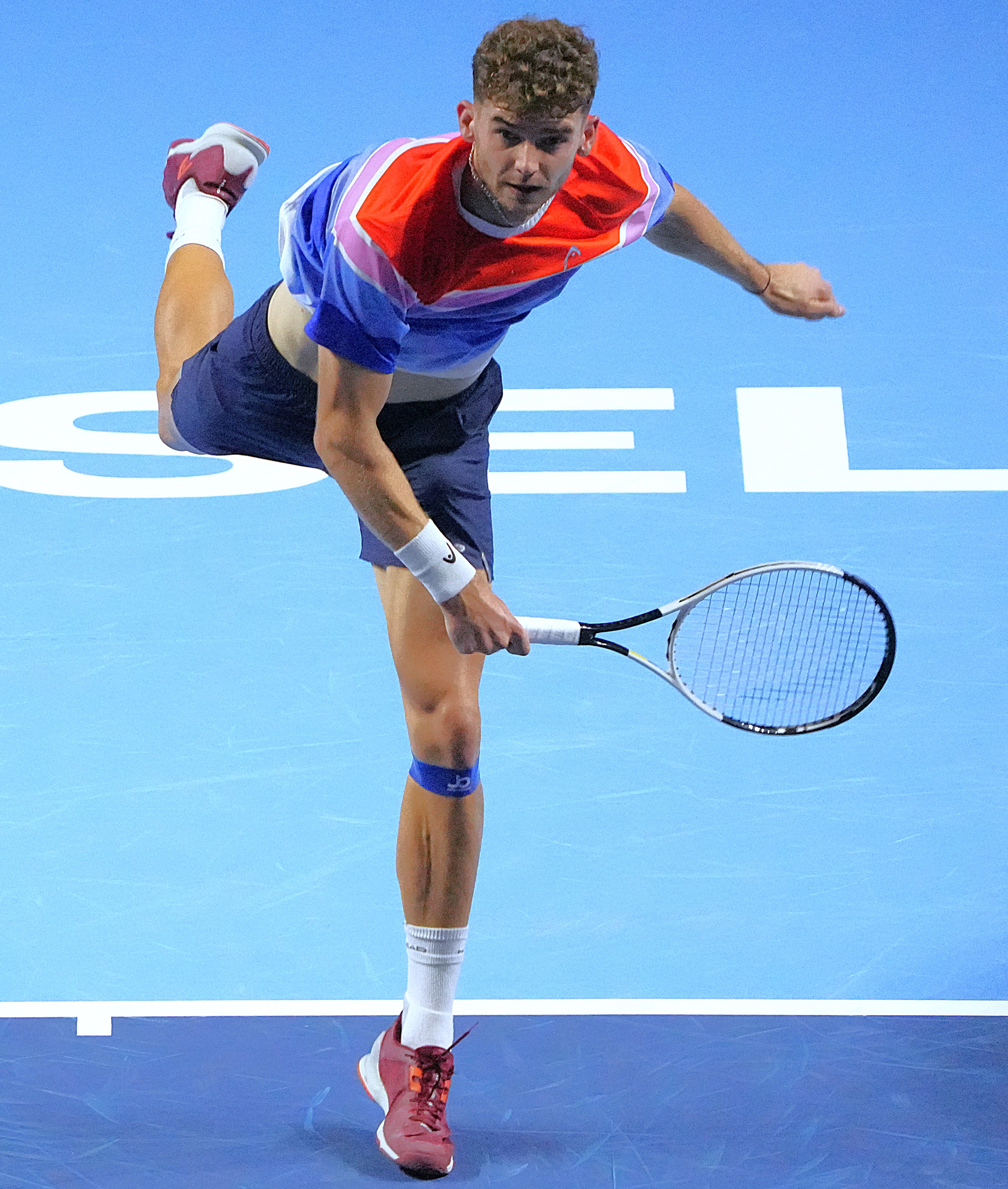
Kym at the 2024 Swiss Indoors

Kym won his maiden Challenger title at the 2024 UniCredit Czech Open as a qualifier defeating Tseng Chun-hsin. Following his second Challenger title at the 2024 Zug Open he reached the top 200 at world No. 181 on 29 July 2024.

At the 2024 Swiss Indoors in Basel, Kym qualified for his first ATP and ATP 500 main draw but lost to fifth seed Ugo Humbert. He reached the top 125 at world No. 123 on 19 May 2025, following the 2025 Italian Open. Kym recorded his first ATP wins at the 2025 Swiss Open Gstaad as a wildcard, over qualifiers Calvin Hemery and Francesco Passaro to reach his first ATP Tour quarterfinal.

Kym qualified for his first Grand Slam main draw at the 2025 US Open and defeated Ethan Quinn for his first major win. He defeated 30th seed Brandon Nakashima in a five-set match to reach the third round of a major for the first time in his debut. He was eliminated in the third round after a four-set defeat to world number four Taylor Fritz. In total, he earned around 237,000 US dollars in prize money.

== Performance timelines ==
Key
W	F	SF	QF	#R	RR	Q#	DNQ	A	NH

(W) winner; (F) finalist; (SF) semifinalist; (QF) quarterfinalist; (#R) rounds 4, 3, 2, 1; (RR) round-robin stage; (Q#) qualification round; (DNQ) did not qualify; (A) absent; (NH) not held; (SR) strike rate (events won / competed); (W–L) win–loss record.
To avoid confusion and double counting, these charts are updated at the conclusion of a tournament or when the player's participation has ended.

=== Singles ===
Current through the 2026 US Open.

Tournament	2021	2022	2023	2024	2025	2026	SR	W–L	Win %
Grand Slam tournaments
Australian Open	A	A	A	A	Q2	Q2	0 / 0	0–0	–
French Open	A	A	A	A	Q1	Q1	0 / 0	0–0	–
Wimbledon	A	A	A	A	Q1	Q3	0 / 0	0–0	–
US Open	A	A	A	Q3	3R	Q2	0 / 1	2–1	67%
Win–loss	0–0	0–0	0–0	0–0	2–1	0–0	0 / 1	2–1	67%
National representation
Davis Cup	G2	A	A	G1	G1	G1	0 / 0	3–2	60%
ATP Masters 1000
Indian Wells Open	A	A	A	A	A	A	0 / 0	0–0	–
Miami Open	A	A	A	A	A	A	0 / 0	0–0	–
Monte-Carlo Masters	A	A	A	A	A	A	0 / 0	0–0	–
Madrid Open	A	A	A	A	Q2	A	0 / 0	0–0	–
Italian Open	A	A	A	A	Q1	A	0 / 0	0–0	–
Canadian Open	A	A	A	A	A	A	0 / 0	0–0	–
Cincinnati Open	A	A	A	A	A	A	0 / 0	0–0	–
Shanghai Masters	NH		A	A	A	A	0 / 0	0–0	–
Paris Masters	A	A	A	A	A		0 / 0	0–0	–
Win–loss	0–0	0–0	0–0	0–0	0–0	0–0	0 / 0	0–0	–
Career statistics
	2021	2022	2023	2024	2025	2026	SR	W–L	Win%
Tournaments	0	0	0	1	2	1	Career total: 4		
Titles	0	0	0	0	0	0	Career total: 0		
Finals	0	0	0	0	0	0	Career total: 0		
Hard win–loss	1–0	0–0	0–0	1–1	2–3	1–0	0 / 2	5–4	56%
Clay win–loss	0–0	0–0	0–0	0–0	2–1	1–1	0 / 2	3–2	60%
Grass win–loss	0–0	0–0	0–0	0–0	0–0	0–0	0 / 0	0–0	–
Overall win–loss	1–0	0–0	0–0	1–1	4–4	2–1	0 / 4	8–6	57%
Win %	100%	–	–	50%	50%	67%	57.14%		
Year-end ranking	1124	428	484	134	187		$824,727		

Jérôme Kym in action at Swiss Indoors Basel on 29 October 2026, where the Swiss wildcard defeated top seed Ben Shelton.

== ATP Challenger Tour finals ==
=== Singles: 4 (2 titles, 2 runner-ups) ===
Legend ATP Challenger Tour (2–2)

Result	W–L	Date	Tournament	Tier	Surface	Opponent	Score
Win	1–0	Jun 2024	Czech Open, Czech Republic	Challenger	Clay	(Chinese Taipei) Tseng Chun-hsin	6–2, 3–6, 6–2
Win	2–0	Jul 2024	Zug Open, Switzerland	Challenger	Clay	(Argentina) Román Andrés Burruchaga	6–4, 6–4
Loss	2–1	Aug 2026	Platzmann Open, Germany	Challenger	Clay	(Germany) Tom Gentzsch	4–6, 6–7^{(4–7)}
Loss	2–2	Nov 2026	Slovak Open, Slovakia	Challenger	Hard (i)	(Austria) Jurij Rodionov	2–6, 1–6

=== Doubles: 3 (1 title, 2 runner-ups) ===
Legend ATP Challenger Tour (1–2)	Finals by surface Hard (0–2) Clay (1–0)

Result	W–L	Date	Tournament	Tier	Surface	Partner	Opponents	Score
Loss	0–1	Mar 2022	Challenger di Lugano, Switzerland	Challenger	Hard (i)	(Switzerland) Leandro Riedi	(Belgium) Ruben Bemelmans (Germany) Daniel Masur	4–6, 7–6^{(7–5)}, [7–10]
Loss	0–2	Jan 2025	Canberra Tennis International, Australia	Challenger	Hard	(France) Pierre-Hugues Herbert	(United States) Ryan Seggerman (United States) Eliot Spizzirri	6–1, 5–7, [5–10]
Win	1–2	Apr 2025	Danube Upper Austria Open, Austria	Challenger	Clay	(Austria) Nico Hipfl	(United Kingdom) David Stevenson (United States) Ryan Seggerman	7–5, 3–6, [10–2]

== ITF World Tennis Tour finals ==
=== Singles: 7 (3 titles, 4 runner-ups) ===
Legend ITF WTT (3–4)	Finals by surface Hard (2–3) Clay (1–1)

Result	W–L	Date	Tournament	Tier	Surface	Opponent	Score
Loss	0–1	Jun 2022	M15 Heraklion, Greece	WTT	Hard	(Australia) Omar Jasika	2–6, 2–6
Loss	0–2	Sep 2022	M25 Setúbal, Portugal	WTT	Hard	(Spain) Adrià Soriano Barrera	6–7^{(7–9)}, 3–6
Loss	0–3	Sep 2022	M25 Plaisir, France	WTT	Hard (i)	(France) Antoine Hoang	6–7^{(0–7)}, 3–6
Win	1–3	Mar 2023	M25 Trento, Italy	WTT	Hard (i)	(United Kingdom) Alastair Gray	7–6^{(9–7)}, 6–2
Win	2–3	Jan 2024	M15 Manacor, Spain	WTT	Hard	(Spain) Pol Martín Tiffon	6–4, 6–2
Win	3–3	Apr 2024	M15 Antalya, Turkey	WTT	Clay	(Bulgaria) Yanaki Milev	7–5, 6–2
Loss	3–4	May 2024	M15 Villach, Austria	WTT	Clay	(Germany) Justin Engel	3–6, 6–3, 3–6

=== Doubles: 5 (2 titles, 3 runner-ups) ===
Legend ITF WTT (2–3)	Finals by surface Hard (0–1) Clay (2–2)

Result	W–L	Date	Tournament	Tier	Surface	Partner	Opponents	Score
Loss	0–1	May 2022	M15 Antalya, Turkey	WTT	Clay	(Poland) Maks Kaśnikowski	(United States) Bruno Kuzuhara (United States) Victor Lilov	walkover
Loss	0–2	Apr 2023	M25 Split, Croatia	WTT	Clay	(Poland) Maks Kaśnikowski	(Poland) Piotr Matuszewski (Ukraine) Oleg Prihodko	2–6, 6–7^{(6–8)}
Loss	0–3	Jan 2024	M15 Manacor, Spain	WTT	Hard	(Colombia) Adrià Soriano Barrera	(Netherlands) Michiel de Krom (Netherlands) Ryan Nijboer	4–6, 6–4, [9–11]
Win	1–3	Apr 2024	M25 Hammamet, Tunisia	WTT	Clay	(Belgium) Raphaël Collignon	(Italy) Luca Giacomini (Italy) Giuseppe Tresca	6–4, 7–5
Win	2–3	May 2024	M15 Villach, Austria	WTT	Clay	(Austria) Nico Hipfl	(Germany) Adrian Oetzbach (Slovakia) Miloš Karol	6–4, 6–3

== Wins over top 10 players ==
- Kym has a 1–1 record against players who were, at the time the match was played, ranked in the top 10.

Season	2026	Total
Wins	1	1

#	Player	Rk	Event	Surface	Rd	Score	Rk	Ref
2026
1.	(United States) Ben Shelton	4	Swiss Indoors, Switzerland	Hard (i)	2R	6–3, 6–7^{(4–7)}, 7–6^{(7–1)}	222	

- Key: (Rk) first use, opponent rank; (Rd) round; (Rk) 2nd use, player rank; (Ref) reference; (F) final; (SF) semifinal; (QF) quarterfinal; (#R) rounds 4, 3, 2, 1; (RR) round-robin stage; (Q#) qualifying rounds or stages (3), 2, 1.
