= Mauthausen, Upper Austria =

Mauthausen
- Municipality
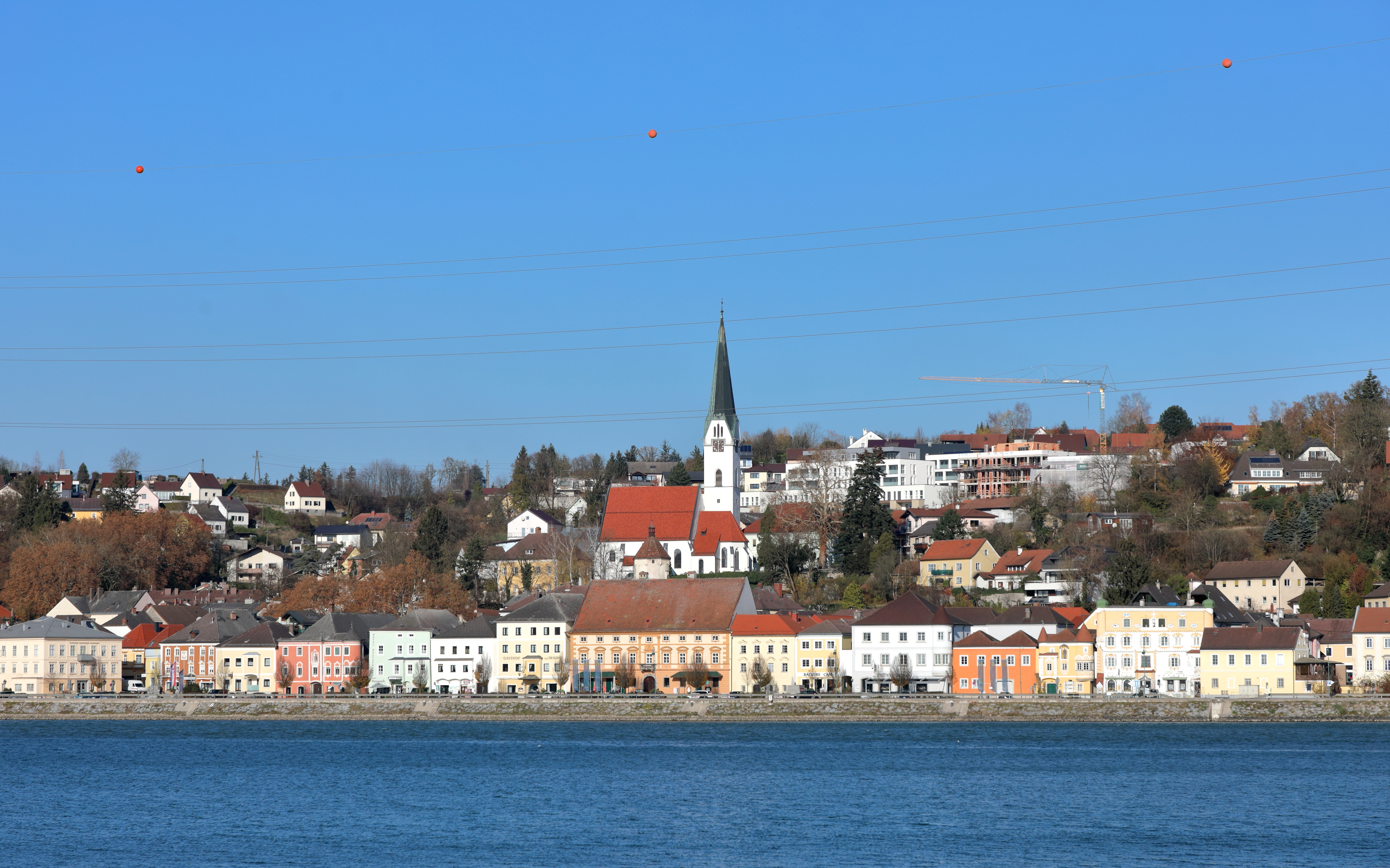
- Center of Mauthausen; Danube river in the foreground

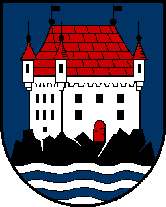
- Coat of arms

- Location within Austria
- Coordinates: 48°14′31″N 14°31′01″E
- Country: Austria
- State: Upper Austria
- District: Perg

Government
  - Mayor: Thomas Punkenhofer (SPÖ)

Area
  - Total: 14.02 km^{2} (5.41 sq mi)
- Elevation: 265 m (869 ft)

Population (2018-01-01)
  - Total: 4,936
  - Density: 352.1/km^{2} (911.9/sq mi)
- Time zone: UTC+1 (CET)
  - Summer (DST): UTC+2 (CEST)
- Postal code: 4310
- Area code: 07238
- Vehicle registration: PE
- Website: www.mauthausen.at

Mauthausen is a small market town in the Austrian state of Upper Austria. It is located at about 20 kilometres east of the city of Linz. The town lies on the banks of the Danube river, opposite the town of Enns, where the major Danube tributary of Enns joins it. During World War II, the town was the site of the Mauthausen concentration camp.

== History ==
The area of Mauthausen has been settled for many millennia, as shown by archaeological discoveries dating back to the Neolithic age. During the time of the Roman Empire, it was at the crossroads of two trade routes.

At the end of the 10th century, it became a toll (Maut in German) station for ships, and the name "Muthusen" for the settlement is first mentioned in 1007.

A village that had developed by the Third Crusade was ordered burned on 16 May 1189 by Emperor Frederick Barbarossa when it levied a tax on his army as it marched towards Vienna.

During the First World War, a prisoner of war camp existed to the east of Mauthausen. Italian, Serbian and Russian (at times 40,000 men) soldiers were imprisoned there, around 10,000 of whom died in the camp, mostly Serbs and Italians. A war cemetery exists in their memory. The prison had guards especially from Hungary who were known for their barbaric tortures of the soldiers.

During the Second World War, from 1938 to 1945, one of the first massive concentration camp complexes in Nazi Germany was set up to the west of the town. Inmates were subjected to barbaric conditions, the most infamous of which was being forced to carry heavy stone blocks up 186 steps from the camp quarry. The steps became known as the "Stairway to Death". A new museum was opened at the camp in 2003.

Mauthausen experienced flooding from the River Danube in 1954 and 2002.

== Population ==
Historical population
Year	Pop.	±%
1869	2,485	—
1880	2,808	+13.0%
1890	3,196	+13.8%
1900	3,354	+4.9%
1910	3,545	+5.7%
1923	3,048	−14.0%
1934	3,186	+4.5%
1939	4,378	+37.4%
1951	3,562	−18.6%
1961	3,836	+7.7%
1971	4,432	+15.5%
1981	4,346	−1.9%
1991	4,403	+1.3%
2001	4,845	+10.0%
2009	4,873	+0.6%
2015	4,894	+0.4%

== Tourism ==
Places of interest in and around Mauthausen include:

- 15th century church
- 16th century Pragstein Schloss (Castle)
- Mauthausen concentration camp (now a museum)
- Picturesque old town
