= Benjamin Hassan =

Lebanese tennis player (born 1995)

- Native name: بنيامين حسن
- Country (sports): Lebanon (Davis Cup since 2018, Olympics since 2024); Germany (–2024)
- Born: 4 February 1995 (age 31) Merzig, Germany
- Height: 1.83 m (6 ft 0 in)
- Plays: Right-handed (two-handed backhand)
- Coach: Hasan Ibrahim, Saki Hassan
- Prize money: US$819,857

Singles
- Career record: 18–15 (at ATP Tour level, Grand Slam level, and in Davis Cup)
- Career titles: 0
- Highest ranking: No. 143 (17 June 2024)
- Current ranking: No. 334 (13 April 2026)

Grand Slam singles results
- Australian Open: Q2 (2024, 2025, 2026)
- French Open: 1R (2025)
- Wimbledon: Q3 (2025)
- US Open: Q2 (2025)

Other tournaments
- Olympic Games: 2R (2024)

Doubles
- Career record: 4–11 (at ATP Tour level, Grand Slam level, and in Davis Cup)
- Career titles: 0
- Highest ranking: No. 168 (7 April 2025)
- Current ranking: No. 398 (13 April 2026)

Other doubles tournaments
- Olympic Games: 1R (2024)
- Last updated on: 13 April 2026.

Benjamin Hassan (Arabic: بنيامين حسن; born 4 February 1995) is a German-born tennis player, currently representing Lebanon. He has a career high ATP singles ranking of world No. 143 achieved on 17 June 2024 and a doubles ranking of No. 168 achieved on 7 April 2025. Hassan became the first Lebanese player to qualify for Roland Garros in the Open Era and to break into the top 200 in ATP Rankings history (since 1973). He is currently the No. 2 player from Lebanon. Since 2018, Hassan represents Lebanon at the Davis Cup, where he has a W/L record of 17–13.

== Career ==
=== 2023: ATP and top 150 debuts ===
He reached the final of the 2023 Lisboa Belém Open where he lost to Flavio Cobolli.

He qualified for the 2023 Stockholm Open for his ATP debut. He also qualified for his first ATP 500, the 2023 Swiss Indoors in Basel defeating Hamad Medjedovic and Dominik Koepfer, but lost to local wildcard Dominic Stricker in the main draw first round.

=== 2024-2025: Historic Olympics first win and Major, Masters debuts ===
He entered the qualifying competition at the 2024 Mutua Madrid Open as an alternate and qualified for his first Masters 1000 main draw with wins over Emilio Nava and Shintaro Mochizuki. He lost to Borna Ćorić in the first round. As a result after the tournament, he reached a new career-high in the top 150 of No. 147 on 6 May 2024.

Ranked No. 146, on 10 June 2024, he was granted the Universality place for the 2024 Paris Olympics, as the first singles tennis player representing Lebanon. He recorded the first win in tennis for his nation over Christopher Eubanks. He also took part in the doubles event partnering compatriot Hady Habib.

Ranked No. 239, Hassan made his Grand Slam main draw debut at the 2025 French Open as a qualifier becoming the first Lebanese player to qualify for Roland Garros in the Open Era.

== Personal life ==
Hassan holds dual-citizenship for both Germany and Lebanon, and plays for Lebanon. Despite this the ATP website listed him as playing for Germany until June 2024. His father Zaki Hassan played in the Lebanese team 1996 Davis Cup.

== Performance timelines ==
Key
W	F	SF	QF	#R	RR	Q#	DNQ	A	NH

(W) winner; (F) finalist; (SF) semifinalist; (QF) quarterfinalist; (#R) rounds 4, 3, 2, 1; (RR) round-robin stage; (Q#) qualification round; (DNQ) did not qualify; (A) absent; (NH) not held; (SR) strike rate (events won / competed); (W–L) win–loss record.
To avoid confusion and double counting, these charts are updated at the conclusion of a tournament or when the player's participation has ended.

Only ATP Tour, Grand Slams and Olympic Games main-draw results are considered in the career statistics.

=== Singles ===
Tournament	2023	2024	2025	2026	SR	W–L	Win%
Grand Slam tournaments
Australian Open	A	Q2	Q2	Q2	0 / 0	0–0	–
French Open	A	Q2	1R		0 / 1	0–1	–
Wimbledon	A	Q1	Q3		0 / 0	0–0	–
US Open	A	Q1	Q2		0 / 0	0–0	–
Win–loss	0–0	0–0	0–1	0–0	0 / 1	0–1	0%
ATP Masters 1000
Indian Wells Masters	A	Q2	A		0 / 0	0–0	–
Miami Open	A	Q1	A		0 / 0	0–0	–
Monte Carlo Masters	A	A	A		0 / 0	0–0	–
Madrid Open	A	1R	A		0 / 1	0-1	0%
Italian Open	A	A	A		0 / 0	0–0	–
Canadian Open	A	A	A		0 / 0	0–0	–
Cincinnati Masters	A	A	A		0 / 0	0–0	–
Shanghai Masters	A	Q1	A		0 / 0	0–0	–
Paris Masters	A	A	A		0 / 0	0–0	–
Win–loss	0–0	0–1	0–0	0–0	0 / 1	0–1	0%
Career statistics
Tournaments	2	3	1		6		
Overall win–loss	0–2	1–3	0–1		1–6		
Year-end ranking	151	218					

=== Doubles ===
Current through the 2024 Summer Olympics.

Tournament	2024	2025	SR	W–L
Grand Slam tournaments
Australian Open	A	A	0 / 0	0–0
French Open	A	A	0 / 0	0–0
Wimbledon	A	A	0 / 0	0–0
US Open	A	A	0 / 0	0–0
ATP Masters 1000
Madrid Open	2R	A	0 / 1	1–1
National representation (Note: for Lebanon)
Olympic Games	1R	NH	0 / 1	0–1
Career statistics
Tournaments	3	0	3	
Overall win–loss	2–3	0–0	2–3	
Year-end ranking	194			

== ATP Challenger finals ==
=== Singles: 4 (0–4) ===
Finals by surface
Hard (0–1)
Clay (0–3)

Result	W–L	Date	Tournament	Surface	Opponent	Score
Loss	0–1	Jul 2022	Troyes, France	Clay	(Argentina) Juan Bautista Torres	6–7^{(2–7)}, 2–6
Loss	0–2	Aug 2023	Grodzisk Mazowiecki, Poland	Hard	(Netherlands) Jesper de Jong	3–6, 3–6
Loss	0–3	Oct 2023	Lisbon, Portugal	Clay	(Italy) Flavio Cobolli	5–7, 5–7
Loss	0–4	Aug 2026	Open de Sion, Switzerland	Clay	(Switzerland) Dominic Stricker	1–6, 6–2, 2–6

=== Doubles: 5 (4–1) ===
Finals by surface
Hard (1–0)
Clay (3–1)

Result	W–L	Date	Tournament	Surface	Partner	Opponents	Score
Loss	0–1	May 2022	Mauthausen, Austria	Clay	(Germany) Johannes Härteis	(Netherlands) Sander Arends (Netherlands) David Pel	4–6, 3–6
Win	1–1	Sep 2024	Genoa, Italy	Clay	(Spain) David Vega Hernández	(Monaco) Romain Arneodo (France) Théo Arribagé	6–4, 7–5
Win	2–1	Nov 2024	Yokohama, Japan	Hard	(India) Saketh Myneni	(Australia) Blake Bayldon (Australia) Calum Puttergill	6–2, 6–4
Win	3–1	Mar 2025	Menorca, Spain	Clay	(Austria) Sebastian Ofner	(Italy) Andrea Vavassori (Italy) Matteo Vavassori	7–5, 6–3
Win	4–1	Mar 2026	Murcia, Spain	Clay	(Austria) Sebastian Ofner	(Poland) Karol Drzewiecki (Poland) Piotr Matuszewski	6–3, 6–4

== ITF Tour finals ==
=== Singles: 7 (2–5) ===
Finals by surface
Hard (2–2)
Clay (0–2)
Carpet (0–1)

Result	W–L	Date	Tournament	Surface	Opponent	Score
Loss	0–1	Sep 2017	Belgium F12, Middelkerke	Clay	(Germany) Marvin Netuschil	6–4, 4–6, 2–6
Loss	0–2	Oct 2017	France F21, Forbach	Carpet (i)	(Germany) Robin Kern	6–4, 5–7, 1–6
Loss	0–3	Dec 2017	Qatar F5, Doha	Hard	(Russia) Aslan Karatsev	4–6, 0–6
Loss	0–4	Dec 2017	Qatar F6, Doha	Hard	(Russia) Alexey Vatutin	1–6, 5–7
Win	1–4	Mar 2018	Qatar F2, Doha	Hard	(United Kingdom) Jay Clarke	3–6, 7–6^{(7–1)}, 6–4
Loss	1–5	Aug 2018	Germany F11, Trier	Clay	(Germany) Jan Choinski	4–6, 6–3, 3–6
Win	2–5	Jan 2022	M25 Manacor, Spain	Hard	(Spain) Alberto Barroso Campos	6–2, 2–6, 6–3

=== Doubles: 7 (4–3) ===
Finals by surface
Hard (0–2)
Clay (4–1)

Result	W–L	Date	Tournament	Surface	Partner	Opponents	Score
Loss	0–1	Jul 2015	Saarlouis, Germany	Clay	(Egypt) Sherif Abohabaga	(Croatia) Duje Kekez (Ukraine) Danylo Kalenichenko	3–6, 2–6
Win	1–1	Aug 2018	Trier, Germany	Clay	(Germany) Constantin Schmitz	(Germany) Christoph Negritu (Peru) Alexander Merino	7–6^{(7–3)}, 4–6, [12–10]
Win	2–1	Mar 2019	M15 Poreč, Croatia	Clay	(Germany) Constantin Schmitz	(Slovenia) Nik Razboršek (Slovenia) Mike Urbanija	6–2, 6–0
Win	3–1	Apr 2021	M15 Antalya, Turkey	Clay	(Germany) Constantin Schmitz	(Spain) Pablo Llamas Ruiz (Spain) Pedro Vives Marcos	6–2, 6–1
Loss	3–2	Apr 2021	M15 Antalya, Turkey	Hard	(Germany) Constantin Schmitz	(Japan) Shintaro Mochizuki (Japan) Rio Noguchi	6–7^{(2–7)}, 2–6
Loss	3–3	Jan 2022	M25 Manacor, Spain	Hard	(Germany) Johannes Härteis	(Spain) Alberto Barroso Campos (Spain) Imanol Lopez Morillo	6–7^{(3–7)}, 4–6
Win	4–3	Aug 2022	M25 Wetzlar, Germany	Clay	(France) Tristan Lamasine	(Germany) Constantin Frantzen (Germany) Tim Sandkaulen	6–4, 6–3

== Davis Cup ==
Legend
Group membership
World Group (0–0)
Group I (6–5)
Group II (4–1)

- ▲ ▼ indicates the outcome of the Davis Cup match followed by the score, date, place of event, the zonal classification and its phase, and the court surface.

Result	Rubber	Match type (partner if any)	Opponent nation	Opponent player(s)	Score
▲3–2; 3–4 February 2018; Taadod Sports Academy, Beirut, Lebanon; Group II Asia/Oceania first round; hard (indoor) surface
Win	I	Singles	Chinese Taipei	Yu Cheng-yu	5–7, 6–3, 6–4
▲3–1; 7–8 April 2018; Notre Dame University – Louaize, Zouk Mosbeh, Lebanon; Group II Asia/Oceania second round; hard surface
Win	I	Singles	Hong Kong	Wong Hong-kit	6–4, 6–1
Win	IV	Singles	Hong Kong	Wong Chun-hun	7–6, 6–3
▲3–2; 15–16 September 2018; The National Tennis Development Center, Nonthaburi, Thailand; Group II Asia/Oceania third round; hard surface
Win	II	Singles	Thailand	Palaphoom Kovapitukted	6–3, 6–4
Loss	IV	Singles	Thailand	Wishaya Trongcharoenchaikul	4–6, 6–4, 4–6
▼2–3; 13–14 September 2019; Automobile and Touring Club of Lebanon, Jounieh, Lebanon; Group I Asia/Oceania; clay surface
Win	II	Singles	Uzbekistan	Khumoyun Sultanov	2–6, 6–3, 7–5
Loss	III	Doubles (with Giovani Samaha)	Uzbekistan	Sanjar Fayziev Jurabek Karimov	2–6, 7–5, 3–6
Win	IV	Singles	Uzbekistan	Sanjar Fayziev	2–6, 6–3, 6–4
▲3–1; 6–7 March 2020; Automobile and Touring Club of Lebanon, Jounieh, Lebanon; World Group I qualifying round; clay surface
Win	I	Singles	Thailand	Jirat Navasirisomboon	6–1, 6–2
Win	III	Doubles (with Giovani Samaha)	Thailand	Kittirat KerdlapheePhongsapak Kerdlaphee	6–3, 6–7^{(7–9)}, 6–0
Win	IV	Singles	Thailand	Wishaya Trongcharoenchaikul	6–2, 6–0
▼0–4; 18–19 September 2021; Automobile and Touring Club of Lebanon, Jounieh, Lebanon; World Group I; clay surface
Loss	I	Singles	Brazil	Orlando Luz	4–6, 4–6
Loss	III	Doubles (with Hady Habib)	Brazil	Marcelo Demoliner Rafael Matos	2–6, 6–3, 6–7^{(5–7)}
▼1–3; 4–5 March 2022; Jan Group Arena, Biel/Bienne, Switzerland; World Group I qualifying round; hard (indoor) surface
Win	I	Singles	Switzerland	Dominic Stricker	6–3, 6–3
Loss	III	Doubles (with Hady Habib)	Switzerland	Marc-Andrea Hüsler Dominic Stricker	4–6, 6–7^{(3–7)}
Loss	IV	Singles	Switzerland	Henri Laaksonen	4–6, 6–7^{(4–7)}
