= Filip Misolic =

Austrian tennis player (born 2001)

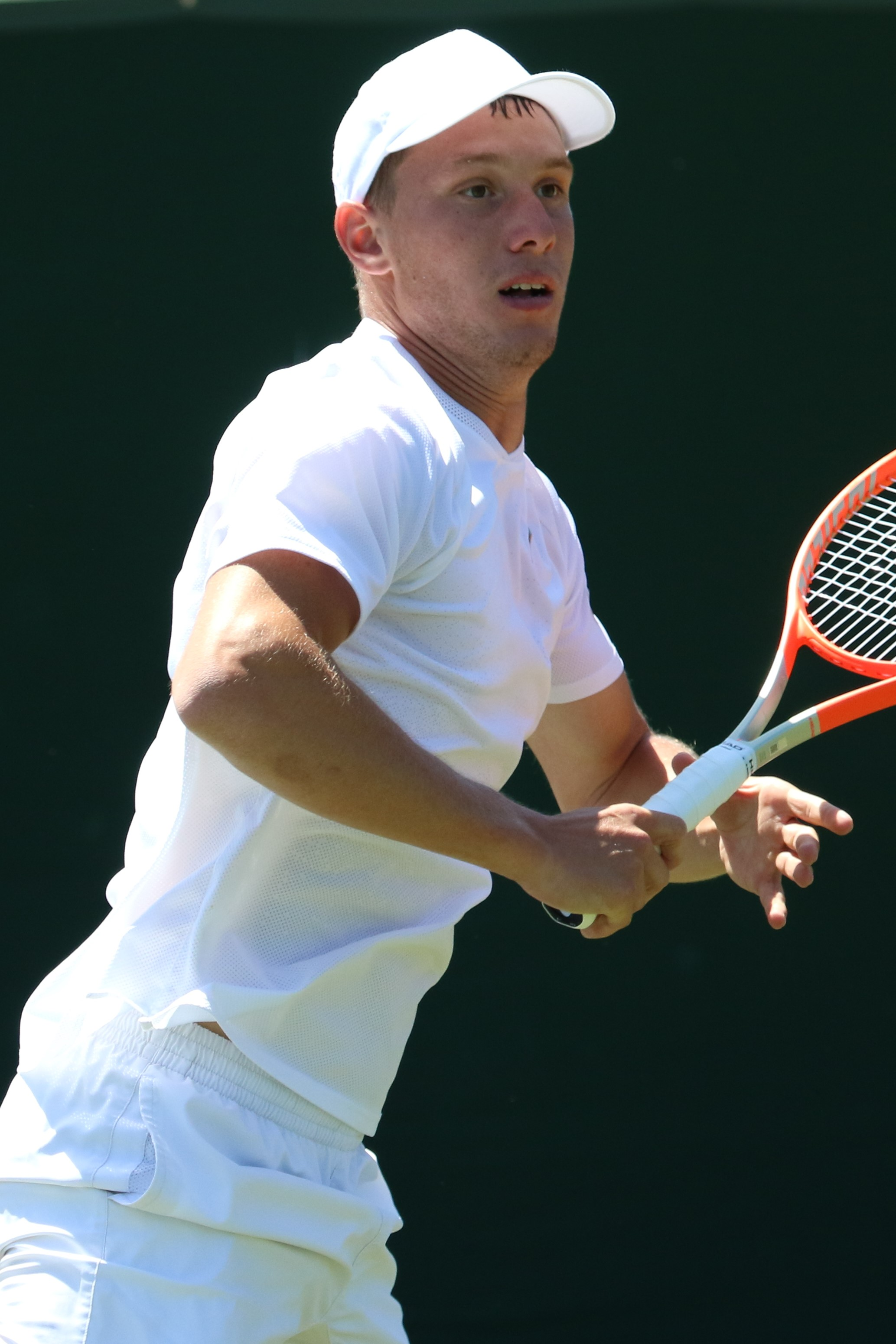
- Misolic at the 2022 Wimbledon Championships
- Country (sports): Austria
- Born: 8 August 2001 (age 25) Graz, Austria
- Height: 1.80 m (5 ft 11 in)
- Turned pro: 2019
- Plays: Right-handed (two-handed backhand)
- Prize money: US $1,216,398

Singles
- Career record: 18–21
- Career titles: 0
- Highest ranking: No. 76 (9 February 2026)
- Current ranking: No. 688 (26 October 2026)

Grand Slam singles results
- Australian Open: 1R (2026)
- French Open: 3R (2025)
- Wimbledon: 1R (2025)
- US Open: 1R (2026)

Doubles
- Career record: 0–1
- Career titles: 0
- Highest ranking: No. 1,051 (27 January 2025)
- Last updated on: 31 October 2026.

Filip Misolic (Croatian: Filip Mišolić, pronounced [filip miʃolitɕ]; born 8 August 2001) is an Austrian tennis player. He has a career-high ATP singles ranking of world No. 76 achieved on 9 February 2026.

== Early life ==
Misolic was born in Graz, Austria to Croatian parents.

== Career ==
=== 2022: Challenger title, ATP debut & first final, top 150 ===
Ranked No. 301, Misolic won the ATP Challenger singles title at the 2022 Zagreb Open. As a result, he reached the top 250, climbing 76 positions up in the rankings to No. 225 on 16 May 2022.

Ranked No. 205, he made his ATP debut at the 2022 Generali Open Kitzbühel as a wildcard, where he reached the quarterfinals defeating Daniel Dutra da Silva and Pablo Andujar. Next he defeated Dusan Lajovic to reach the first ATP semifinal in his career. He reached his maiden ATP final defeating Yannick Hanfmann in a final set tiebreak. As a result, he moved close to 70 positions up the rankings in the top 150 to a new career-high of world No. 137 and became the Austrian player No. 1 on 1 August 2022.

=== 2023: Second Challenger title & ATP quarterfinal ===
Following his second Challenger title at the 2023 Challenger di Roseto degli Abruzzi, he reached a new career-high ranking of world No. 126 on 24 April 2023.

He reached the quarterfinals at the 2023 Swedish Open in Bastad after qualifying into the main draw, where he lost to third seed Lorenzo Musetti in three sets. Ranked No. 181, he also qualified for the 2023 Stockholm Open and defeated eight seed Dan Evans, before losing to eventual champion Gael Monfils. He also qualified for his home tournament, the 2023 Erste Bank Open.

=== 2024–2026: Major debut and third round, top 80 ===
Ranked No. 241, he made his Grand Slam debut at the 2024 French Open after qualifying for the main draw, and defeated lucky loser Otto Virtanen in five sets. As a result, he moved more than 50 positions up, back into the top 200 in the rankings on 10 June 2024. He also qualified for the 2024 Croatia Open Umag but lost to Dušan Lajović in the first round.

He reached the final at the 2025 Tenerife Challenger II, but lost to Pablo Carreno Busta. Ranked No. 232 at the 2025 Țiriac Open, Misolic qualified for the main draw and defeated Alexander Shevchenko and eight seed Camilo Ugo Carabelli to reach his second ATP quarterfinal. As a result, he moved close to 40 positions up in the rankings and returned to the top 200 on 7 April 2025. Misolic won his third ATP Challenger title at the 2025 Prague Open, defeating Guy den Ouden in the final.

Misolic qualified for the main draw of the 2025 French Open, defeating again second qualifying seed Alexander Shevchenko. Misolic defeated Yunchaokete Bu, and 27th seed Denis Shapovalov in five sets, to reach a major third round for the first time in his career. He lost to sixth seed Novak Djokovic in the third round in straight sets. At the 30th edition of the Enea Poznań Open, Misolic defeated Dalibor Svrcina 6–2, 6–0 in the singles final in just 75 minutes, the third Austrian player in history to win the ATP Challenger 100 event.

At the 2025 Nordea Open he reached his first ATP quarterfinal of the season, defeating defending champion Nuno Borges after saving three match points. As a result, he reached the top 100 in the singles rankings on 21 July 2025.

== Performance timeline ==
Key
W	F	SF	QF	#R	RR	Q#	DNQ	A	NH

(W) winner; (F) finalist; (SF) semifinalist; (QF) quarterfinalist; (#R) rounds 4, 3, 2, 1; (RR) round-robin stage; (Q#) qualification round; (DNQ) did not qualify; (A) absent; (NH) not held; (SR) strike rate (events won / competed); (W–L) win–loss record.
To avoid confusion and double counting, these charts are updated at the conclusion of a tournament or when the player's participation has ended.

Current through the 2026 US Open.

Tournament	2021	2022	2023	2024	2025	2026	SR	W–L
Grand Slam tournaments
Australian Open	A	A	Q1	Q1	A	1R	0 / 1	0–1
French Open	A	A	Q2	2R	3R	A	0 / 2	3–2
Wimbledon	A	Q1	Q1	A	1R	A	0 / 1	0–1
US Open	A	Q2	Q2	A	A	1R	0 / 1	0–1
Win–loss	0–0	0–0	0–0	1–1	2–2	0–2	0 / 5	3–5
National representation
Davis Cup	A	WG I	A	A	QF		0 / 2	1–1
ATP Tour Masters 1000
Indian Wells Masters	A	A	Q2	A	A		0 / 0	0–0
Miami Open	A	A	Q2	A	A		0 / 0	0–0
Monte Carlo Masters	A	A	A	A	A		0 / 0	0–0
Madrid Open	A	A	Q1	A	A		0 / 0	0-0
Italian Open	A	A	A	A	A		0 / 0	0–0
Canadian Open	A	A	A	A	A		0 / 0	0–0
Cincinnati Masters	A	A	A	A	A		0 / 0	0–0
Shanghai Masters	NH		A	A	Q1		0 / 0	0–0
Paris Masters	A	A	A	A	A		0 / 0	0–0
Career statistics
Tournaments	0	2	5	2	9	2	20	
Titles	0	0	0	0	0	0	0	
Finals	0	1	0	0	0	0	1	
Overall win–loss	0–0	5–2	3–5	1–2	9–10	0–2	18–21	
Year-end ranking	354	149	146	321	79		46%	

== ATP Tour finals ==
=== Singles: 1 (1 runner-up) ===
Legend Grand Slam (0–0) ATP Masters 1000 (0–0) ATP 500 (0–0) ATP 250 (0–1)	Finals by surface Hard (0–0) Clay (0–1) Grass (0–0)	Finals by setting Outdoor (0–1) Indoor (0–0)

Result	W–L	Date	Tournament	Tier	Surface	Opponent	Score
Loss	0–1	Jul 2022	Austrian Open, Austria	ATP 250	Clay	(Spain) Roberto Bautista Agut	2–6, 2–6

== ATP Challenger Tour finals ==
=== Singles: 6 (4 titles, 2 runner-ups) ===
Legend ATP Challenger Tour (4–2)	Finals by surface Hard (0–1) Clay (4–1)

Result	W–L	Date	Tournament	Tier	Surface	Opponent	Score
Win	1–0	May 2022	Zagreb Open, Croatia	Challenger	Clay	(Croatia) Mili Poljičak	6–3, 7–6^{(8–6)}
Win	2–0	Apr 2023	Challenger di Roseto degli Abruzzi, Italy	Challenger	Clay	(Belgium) Raphaël Collignon	4–6, 7–5, 7–6^{(8–6)}
Loss	2–1	May 2023	Danube Upper Austria Open, Austria	Challenger	Clay	(Serbia) Hamad Medjedovic	2–6, 7–6^{(7–5)}, 4–6
Loss	2–2	Feb 2025	Tenerife Challenger II, Spain	Challenger	Hard	(Spain) Pablo Carreño Busta	3–6, 2–6
Win	3–2	May 2025	Advantage Cars Prague Open, Czechia	Challenger	Clay	(Netherlands) Guy den Ouden	6–4, 6–0
Win	4–2	Jun 2025	Enea Poznań Open, Poland	Challenger	Clay	(Czech Republic) Dalibor Svrčina	6–2, 6–0

== ITF World Tennis Tour finals ==
=== Singles: 7 (6 titles, 1 runner-up) ===
Legend ITF WTT (6–1)	Finals by surface Hard (0–0) Clay (6–1)

Result	W–L	Date	Tournament	Tier	Surface	Opponent	Score
Loss	0–1	Dec 2020	M15 Antalya, Turkey	WTT	Clay	(Denmark) Holger Rune	0–6, 0–4 ret.
Win	1–1	Mar 2021	M15 Poreč, Croatia	WTT	Clay	(Italy) Pietro Rondoni	6–4, 6–4
Win	2–1	Jul 2021	M25 Telfs, Austria	WTT	Clay	(Romania) Bogdan Ionut Apostol	7–6^{(9–7)}, 6–1
Win	3–1	Aug 2021	M15 Novi Sad, Serbia	WTT	Clay	(Italy) Luciano Darderi	6–4, 6–4
Win	4–1	Aug 2021	M15 Novi Sad, Serbia	WTT	Clay	(Argentina) Francisco Comesaña	6–4, 6–3
Win	5–1	Sep 2021	M25 Pardubice, Czech Republic	WTT	Clay	(Germany) Henri Squire	7–5, 6–3
Win	6–1	Mar 2022	M25 Poreč, Croatia	WTT	Clay	(Spain) Oriol Roca Batalla	3–6, 7–6^{(7–2)}, 6–4

== Wins over top 10 players ==
- Filip Misolic has a 0–2 (0%) record against players who were, at the time the match was played, ranked in the top 10.

Season	2024	2025	Total
Wins	0	0	0

*As of 24 October 2025
