= 2025 Open de Roanne – Singles =

Singles
- 2025 Open de Roanne

Final
- Champion: (Finland) Otto Virtanen
- Runner-up: (France) Hugo Gaston
- Score: 6–1, 3–6, 6–3

Events
| Singles | Doubles |
| ← 2024 · | Open de Roanne | · 2026 → |

Benjamin Bonzi was the defending champion but chose not to defend his title.

Otto Virtanen won the title after defeating Hugo Gaston 6–1, 3–6, 6–3 in the final.

== Seeds ==
1. (United Kingdom) Jacob Fearnley (second round)
2. (Australia) Jordan Thompson (second round, retired)
3. (Austria) Filip Misolic (first round)
4. (Germany) Jan-Lennard Struff (first round)
5. (France) Hugo Gaston (final)
6. (Spain) Pablo Carreño Busta (first round)
7. (Belgium) Alexander Blockx (second round)
8. (Italy) Francesco Passaro (second round)

== Draw ==
=== Key ===
- Q = Qualifier
- WC = Wild card
- LL = Lucky loser
- Alt = Alternate
- ITF = ITF entry
- PR = Protected ranking
- SR = Special ranking
- SE = Special exempt
- JE = Junior exempt
- JR = Junior Accelerator Programme entrant
- CO = College Accelerator Programme entrant
- NG = Next Gen Accelerator Program entrant
- w/o = Walkover
- r = Retired
- d = Defaulted

=== Finals ===
Semifinals
NG | (Croatia) Matej Dodig | 6 | 3 | 3
5 | (France) Hugo Gaston | 3 | 6 | 6
Q | (France) Matteo Martineau | 6^{3} | 4
(Finland) Otto Virtanen | 7^{7} | 6

Final
5 | (France) Hugo Gaston | 1 | 6 | 3
(Finland) Otto Virtanen | 6 | 3 | 6

=== Top half ===
First round
1 | (United Kingdom) J Fearnley | 3 | 6 | 6
(France) L Van Assche | 6 | 2 | 3
Q | (Switzerland) D Stricker | 6 | 7^{7}
(Luxembourg) C Rodesch | 4 | 6^{5}
NG | (Croatia) M Dodig | 6 | 6
(United States) C Eubanks | 4 | 4
(France) S Gueymard Wayenburg | 4 | 6 | 4
8 | (Italy) F Passaro | 6 | 3 | 6
3 | (Austria) F Misolic | 6 | 3 | 4
WC | (Switzerland) H Bernet | 3 | 6 | 6
(Ukraine) V Sachko | 7^{7} | 2 | 4
(Norway) N Budkov Kjær | 6^{4} | 6 | 6
Alt | (Croatia) B Gojo | 6 | 4 | 7
(France) C Chidekh | 0 | 6 | 5
Q | (Norway) V Durasovic | 5 | 3
5 | (France) H Gaston | 7 | 6

Second round
1 | (United Kingdom) J Fearnley | 4 | 4
Q | (Switzerland) D Stricker | 6 | 6
NG | (Croatia) M Dodig | 6 | 6
8 | (Italy) F Passaro | 3 | 4
WC | (Switzerland) H Bernet | 3 | 6 | 1
(Norway) N Budkov Kjær | 6 | 3 | 6
Alt | (Croatia) B Gojo | 7 | 6^{3} | 5
5 | (France) H Gaston | 5 | 7^{7} | 7

Quarterfinals
Q | (Switzerland) D Stricker | 2^{r}
NG | (Croatia) M Dodig | 3
(Norway) N Budkov Kjær | 4 | 6 | 1
5 | (France) H Gaston | 6 | 3 | 6

Semifinals
NG | (Croatia) M Dodig | 6 | 3 | 3
5 | (France) H Gaston | 3 | 6 | 6

=== Bottom half ===
First round
6 | (Spain) P Carreño Busta | 7^{10} | 5 | 6^{7}
LL | (Slovakia) M Karol | 6^{8} | 7 | 7^{9}
(Canada) A Galarneau | 3 | 3
Q | (France) M Martineau | 6 | 6
Q | (Switzerland) M Brunold | 6 | 6
Alt | (Germany) J Engel | 4 | 4
Q | (Greece) S Sakellaridis | 3 | 7^{8} | 7
4 | (Germany) J-L Struff | 6 | 6^{6} | 5
7 | (Belgium) A Blockx | 6 | 6
LL | (Netherlands) J Sels | 1 | 3
WC | (France) T Paris | 3 | 6^{5}
(Finland) O Virtanen | 6 | 7^{7}
Q | (Estonia) D Glinka | 3 | 4
(France) C Hemery | 6 | 6
WC | (France) D Added | 3 | 1
2 | (Australia) J Thompson | 6 | 6

Second round
LL | (Slovakia) M Karol | 6 | 6^{5} | 6^{7}
Q | (France) M Martineau | 3 | 7^{7} | 7^{9}
Q | (Switzerland) M Brunold | 6 | 6
Q | (Greece) S Sakellaridis | 2 | 3
7 | (Belgium) A Blockx | 6 | 3 | 6^{3}
(Finland) O Virtanen | 2 | 6 | 7^{7}
(France) C Hemery | 5
2 | (Australia) J Thompson | 2^{r}

Quarterfinals
Q | (France) M Martineau | 6^{4} | 6 | 7^{7}
Q | (Switzerland) M Brunold | 7^{7} | 1 | 6^{0}
(Finland) O Virtanen | 6 | 6
(France) C Hemery | 4 | 4

Semifinals
Q | (France) M Martineau | 6^{3} | 4
(Finland) O Virtanen | 7^{7} | 6
