= 2022 Open International de Tennis de Roanne – Singles =

Singles
- 2022 Open International de Tennis de Roanne

Final
- Champion: (France) Hugo Gaston
- Runner-up: (Switzerland) Henri Laaksonen
- Score: 6–7^{(6–8)}, 7–5, 6–1

Events
Singles	Doubles
← 2021 ·	Open International de Tennis de Roanne	· 2024 →

Hugo Grenier was the defending champion but lost in the first round to Otto Virtanen.

Hugo Gaston won the title after defeating Henri Laaksonen 6–7^{(6–8)}, 7–5, 6–1 in the final.

== Seeds ==
1. (Moldova) Radu Albot (first round)
2. (France) Hugo Gaston (champion)
3. Pavel Kotov (quarterfinals)
4. (Australia) Jason Kubler (first round)
5. (Georgia (country)) Nikoloz Basilashvili (quarterfinals)
6. (Australia) Alexei Popyrin (semifinals)
7. (France) Hugo Grenier (first round)
8. (Spain) Fernando Verdasco (second round, retired)

== Draw ==
=== Key ===
- Q = Qualifier
- WC = Wild card
- LL = Lucky loser
- Alt = Alternate
- ITF = ITF entry
- PR = Protected ranking
- SR = Special ranking
- SE = Special exempt
- JE = Junior exempt
- JR = Junior Accelerator Programme entrant
- CO = College Accelerator Programme entrant
- NG = Next Gen Accelerator Program entrant
- w/o = Walkover
- r = Retired
- d = Defaulted

=== Finals ===
Semifinals
6	(Australia) Alexei Popyrin	4	6	4
(Switzerland) Henri Laaksonen	6	3	6
(Finland) Otto Virtanen	5	5
2	(France) Hugo Gaston	7	7

Final
(Switzerland) Henri Laaksonen	7^{8}	5	1
2	(France) Hugo Gaston	6^{6}	7	6

=== Top half ===
First round
1	(Moldova) R Albot	3	4
(Bulgaria) D Kuzmanov	6	6
(Bulgaria) A Andreev	6	4	6^{1}
WC	(France) A Fils	4	6	7^{7}
Q	(France) M Janvier	2	4
Q	A Kachmazov	6	6
A Vatutin	2	0
6	(Australia) A Popyrin	6	6
4	(Australia) J Kubler	6	6^{6}	1
(France) L Van Assche	1	7^{8}	6
(United Kingdom) J Clarke	3	6	2
(Spain) N Sánchez Izquierdo	6	1	6
(Switzerland) A Bellier	6	5	5
(Switzerland) H Laaksonen	3	7	7
WC	(France) G Mpetshi Perricard	4	4
8	(Spain) F Verdasco	6	6

Second round
(Bulgaria) D Kuzmanov	6	6^{3}	3
WC	(France) A Fils	4	7^{7}	6
Q	A Kachmazov	5	1
6	(Australia) A Popyrin	7	6
(France) L Van Assche	6	6
(Spain) N Sánchez Izquierdo	3	3
(Switzerland) H Laaksonen	1	6	2
8	(Spain) F Verdasco	6	3	1^{r}

Quarterfinals
WC	(France) A Fils	7	5	4
6	(Australia) A Popyrin	5	7	6
(France) L Van Assche	6^{5}	4
(Switzerland) H Laaksonen	7^{7}	6

Semifinals
6	(Australia) A Popyrin	4	6	4
(Switzerland) H Laaksonen	6	3	6

=== Bottom half ===
First round
7	(France) H Grenier	4	6^{6}
(Finland) O Virtanen	6	7^{8}
WC	(France) U Blanchet	6	6
(Netherlands) G Brouwer	4	3
(Switzerland) L Riedi	7^{8}	4	3
(Spain) P Andújar	6^{6}	6	6
(Switzerland) A Ritschard	4	3
3	P Kotov	6	6
5	(Georgia (country)) N Basilashvili	7^{7}	4	6
Q	(France) A Hoang	6^{5}	6	2
Q	(France) M Bourgue	6	6
LL	(Kazakhstan) D Yevseyev	3	2
Q	(France) V Royer	7^{7}	2	7^{11}
(France) M Guinard	6^{5}	6	6^{9}
Q	(Bulgaria) A Lazarov	4	2^{r}
2	(France) H Gaston	6	4

Second round
(Finland) O Virtanen	6^{4}	6	6
WC	(France) U Blanchet	7^{7}	4	1
(Spain) P Andújar	0	3
3	P Kotov	6	6
5	(Georgia (country)) N Basilashvili	6	6
Q	(France) M Bourgue	4	2
Q	(France) V Royer	6	2	3
2	(France) H Gaston	3	6	6

Quarterfinals
(Finland) O Virtanen	6	2	6
3	P Kotov	1	6	2
5	(Georgia (country)) N Basilashvili	7^{7}	2	1
2	(France) H Gaston	6^{2}	6	6

Semifinals
(Finland) O Virtanen	5	5
2	(France) H Gaston	7	7
