= 2022 Open International de Tennis de Roanne – Doubles =

Doubles
- 2022 Open International de Tennis de Roanne

Final
- Champions: (France) Sadio Doumbia (France) Fabien Reboul
- Runners-up: (Jamaica) Dustin Brown (Poland) Szymon Walków
- Score: 7–6^{(7–5)}, 6–4

Events
Singles	Doubles
← 2021 ·	Open International de Tennis de Roanne	· 2024 →

Lloyd Glasspool and Harri Heliövaara were the defending champions but chose not to defend their title.

Sadio Doumbia and Fabien Reboul won the title after defeating Dustin Brown and Szymon Walków 7–6^{(7–5)}, 6–4 in the final.

== Seeds ==
1. (France) Sadio Doumbia / (France) Fabien Reboul (champions)
2. (France) Dan Added / (France) Albano Olivetti (semifinals)
3. (Netherlands) Sander Arends / (France) Jonathan Eysseric (semifinals)
4. (Jamaica) Dustin Brown / (Poland) Szymon Walków (final)

== Draw ==
=== Key ===
- Q = Qualifier
- WC = Wild card
- LL = Lucky loser
- Alt = Alternate
- ITF = ITF entry
- PR = Protected ranking
- SR = Special ranking
- SE = Special exempt
- JE = Junior exempt
- JR = Junior Accelerator Programme entrant
- CO = College Accelerator Programme entrant
- NG = Next Gen Accelerator Program entrant
- w/o = Walkover
- r = Retired
- d = Defaulted

First round
1	(France) S Doumbia (France) F Reboul	6	6
(Bulgaria) A Lazarov (Bulgaria) R Shandarov	4	3
P Kotov (Kazakhstan) D Yevseyev	1	4
(Bulgaria) A Donski (Greece) Pe Tsitsipas	6	6
3	(Netherlands) S Arends (France) J Eysseric	7	6
WC	(France) U Blanchet (France) Mayeul Darras	5	3
(Bulgaria) A Andreev (Bulgaria) D Kuzmanov	6	3	[6]
A Kachmazov; A Vatutin	1	6	[10]
(Finland) E Vasa (Netherlands) M Veldheer	4	4
(Germany) F Fallert (Germany) H Jebens	6	6
(France) M Janvier (Belgium) Y Mertens
4	(Jamaica) D Brown (Poland) S Walków	w/o
(Netherlands) G Brouwer (United States) R Stalder
(Italy) Davide Pozzi (Italy) Augusto Virgili	w/o
(Australia) M Ebden (Poland) Ł Kubot	2	2
2	(France) D Added (France) A Olivetti	6	6

Quarterfinals
1	(France) S Doumbia (France) F Reboul	6	6
(Bulgaria) A Donski (Greece) Pe Tsitsipas	4	0
3	(Netherlands) S Arends (France) J Eysseric	6	6
A Kachmazov; A Vatutin	4	1
(Germany) F Fallert (Germany) H Jebens	4	2
4	(Jamaica) D Brown (Poland) S Walków	6	6
(Italy) D Pozzi (Italy) A Virgili	2	2
2	(France) D Added (France) A Olivetti	6	6

Semifinals
1	(France) S Doumbia (France) F Reboul	6	6
3	(Netherlands) S Arends (France) J Eysseric	3	4
4	(Jamaica) D Brown (Poland) S Walków	3	6	[10]
2	(France) D Added (France) A Olivetti	6	3	[8]

Final
1	(France) S Doumbia (France) F Reboul	7^{7}	6
4	(Jamaica) D Brown (Poland) S Walków	6^{5}	4
