= 2026 Open de Roanne – Doubles =

Doubles
- 2026 Open de Roanne

Final
- Champions: (Monaco) Romain Arneodo (Germany) Hendrik Jebens
- Runners-up: (United Kingdom) David Stevenson (United Kingdom) Marcus Willis
- Score: 6–4, 6–4

Events
Singles	Doubles
- Open de Roanne

Vasil Kirkov and Bart Stevens were the defending champions but chose not to defend their title.

Romain Arneodo and Hendrik Jebens won the title after defeating David Stevenson and Marcus Willis 6–4, 6–4 in the final.

== Seeds ==
1. (Argentina) Guido Andreozzi / (France) Manuel Guinard (first round)
2. (Netherlands) David Pel / (Australia) John-Patrick Smith (quarterfinals)
3. (Switzerland) Jakub Paul / (Czech Republic) Matěj Vocel (quarterfinals)
4. (United Kingdom) David Stevenson / (United Kingdom) Marcus Willis (final)

== Draw ==
Key

- Q = Qualifier
- WC = Wild card
- LL = Lucky loser
- Alt = Alternate
- ITF = ITF entry
- PR = Protected ranking
- SR = Special ranking
- SE = Special exempt
- JE = Junior exempt
- JR = Junior Accelerator Programme entrant
- CO = College Accelerator Programme entrant
- NG = Next Gen Accelerator Program entrant
- w/o = Walkover
- r = Retired
- d = Defaulted

First round
1	(Argentina) G Andreozzi (France) M Guinard	4	4
Alt	(Netherlands) D de Jonge (Germany) J Opitz	6	6
(United States) B Kittay (Japan) T Yuzuki	1	4
(New Zealand) F Reynolds (New Zealand) J Watt	6	6
4	(United Kingdom) D Stevenson (United Kingdom) M Willis	7^{7}	7^{7}
(Romania) V Cornea (France) S Doumbia	6^{1}	6^{3}
WC	(France) F Balshaw (France) M Martineau	6	6
(India) A Kadhe (Antigua and Barbuda) J Maginley	4	3
(Tunisia) S Mansouri (Austria) M Neuchrist	3	5
(Uruguay) A Behar (United Kingdom) J Paris	6	7
(Bulgaria) A Genov (United Kingdom) M Whitehouse	6^{2}	1
3	(Switzerland) J Paul (Czech Republic) M Vocel	7^{7}	6
(Monaco) R Arneodo (Germany) H Jebens	6	6
Alt	(Switzerland) H Bernet (Switzerland) D Stricker	4	4
(United Kingdom) F Bass (United Kingdom) S Duncan	6^{5}	6^{4}
2	(Netherlands) D Pel (Australia) J-P Smith	7^{7}	7^{7}

Quarterfinals
Alt	(Netherlands) D de Jonge (Germany) J Opitz	7	6
(New Zealand) F Reynolds (New Zealand) J Watt	5	4
4	(United Kingdom) D Stevenson (United Kingdom) M Willis	7^{10}	6
WC	(France) F Balshaw (France) M Martineau	6^{8}	3
(Uruguay) A Behar (United Kingdom) J Paris	7^{10}	6
3	(Switzerland) J Paul (Czech Republic) M Vocel	6^{8}	4
(Monaco) R Arneodo (Germany) H Jebens	6	6
2	(Netherlands) D Pel (Australia) J-P Smith	3	3

Semifinals
Alt	(Netherlands) D de Jonge (Germany) J Opitz	5	6^{9}
4	(United Kingdom) D Stevenson (United Kingdom) M Willis	7	7^{11}
(Uruguay) A Behar (United Kingdom) J Paris	6	2	[8]
(Monaco) R Arneodo (Germany) H Jebens	4	6	[10]

Final
4	(United Kingdom) D Stevenson (United Kingdom) M Willis	4	4
(Monaco) R Arneodo (Germany) H Jebens	6	6
