= 2024 Open de Roanne – Singles =

Singles
- 2024 Open de Roanne

Final
- Champion: (France) Benjamin Bonzi
- Runner-up: (France) Matteo Martineau
- Score: 7–5, 6–1

Events
Singles	Doubles
← 2022 ·	Open de Roanne	· 2025 →

Hugo Gaston was the defending champion but chose not to defend his title.

Benjamin Bonzi won the title after defeating Matteo Martineau 7–5, 6–1 in the final.

== Seeds ==
1. (United Kingdom) Cameron Norrie (quarterfinals)
2. (France) Quentin Halys (withdrew)
3. (Italy) Mattia Bellucci (second round)
4. (Croatia) Duje Ajduković (first round)
5. (France) Luca Van Assche (semifinals)
6. (France) Pierre-Hugues Herbert (quarterfinals)
7. (France) Lucas Pouille (withdrew)
8. (France) Constant Lestienne (second round)

== Draw ==
=== Key ===
- Q = Qualifier
- WC = Wild card
- LL = Lucky loser
- Alt = Alternate
- SE = Special exempt
- PR = Protected ranking
- ITF = ITF entry
- JE = Junior exempt
- w/o = Walkover
- r = Retired
- d = Defaulted
- SR = Special ranking

=== Finals ===
Semifinals
5/WC	(France) Luca Van Assche	4	1
(France) Benjamin Bonzi	6	6
Alt	(France) Matteo Martineau	6	6^{4}	6
(France) Hugo Grenier	3	7^{7}	2

Final
(France) Benjamin Bonzi	7	6
Alt	(France) Matteo Martineau	5	1

=== Top half ===
First round
1	(United Kingdom) C Norrie	6	6
Q	(France) Étienne Donnet	1	2
(Italy) S Travaglia	7^{7}	6
(France) A Escoffier	6^{4}	3
Alt	(France) C Hemery	6	5	6^{5}
(Austria) J Rodionov	3	7	7^{7}
(France) T Droguet	6^{4}	3
5/WC	(France) L Van Assche	7^{7}	6
4	(Croatia) D Ajduković	2	3
Alt	(France) C Chidekh	6	6
(Czech Republic) Jakub Nicod	2	6^{4}
(France) B Bonzi	6	7^{7}
(France) V Royer	4	6	7^{7}
(Denmark) A Holmgren	6	3	6^{4}
Q	(Netherlands) J Sels	3	4
6	(France) P-H Herbert	6	6

Second round
1	(United Kingdom) C Norrie	3	6	6
(Italy) S Travaglia	6	2	0
(Austria) J Rodionov	2	1
5/WC	(France) L Van Assche	6	6
Alt	(France) C Chidekh	4	4
(France) B Bonzi	6	6
(France) V Royer	4	6^{3}
6	(France) P-H Herbert	6	7^{7}

Quarterfinals
1	(United Kingdom) C Norrie	6	5	3
5/WC	(France) L Van Assche	1	7	6
(France) B Bonzi	6^{11}	6	6
6	(France) P-H Herbert	7^{13}	4	4

Semifinals
5/WC	(France) L Van Assche	4	1
(France) B Bonzi	6	6

=== Bottom half ===
First round
8	(France) C Lestienne	6	6
WC	(France) T Papamalamis	1	3
LL	(Switzerland) A Bellier	6^{4}	6^{4}
Alt	(France) M Martineau	7^{7}	7^{7}
Q	(Sweden) E Ymer	6^{5}	4
(Switzerland) J Kym	7^{7}	6
(France) G Barrère	4	6^{4}
3	(Italy) M Bellucci	6	7^{7}
Q	(Ukraine) V Sachko	6	5	3
Q	(Spain) D Jordà Sanchis	4	7	6
(Croatia) M Poljičak	6	7
Q	(France) R Bertrand	2	5
(France) H Grenier	4	7^{7}	6
(Germany) H Squire	6	6^{2}	4
WC	(France) G Debru	4	4
LL	(Czech Republic) J Veselý	6	6

Second round
8	(France) C Lestienne	7	6^{4}	3
Alt	(France) M Martineau	5	7^{7}	6
(Switzerland) J Kym	7	6
3	(Italy) M Bellucci	5	3
Q	(Spain) D Jordà Sanchis	3	6	6
(Croatia) M Poljičak	6	3	4
(France) H Grenier	6	6
LL	(Czech Republic) J Veselý	3	4

Quarterfinals
Alt	(France) M Martineau	6	7^{8}
(Switzerland) J Kym	3	6^{6}
Q	(Spain) D Jordà Sanchis	4^{r}
(France) H Grenier	5

Semifinals
Alt	(France) M Martineau	6	6^{4}	6
(France) H Grenier	3	7^{7}	2
