= 2021 Open International de Tennis de Roanne – Singles =

Singles
- 2021 Open International de Tennis de Roanne

Final
- Champion: (France) Hugo Grenier
- Runner-up: (Japan) Hiroki Moriya
- Score: 6–2, 6–3

Events
Singles	Doubles
- Open International de Tennis de Roanne

This was the first edition of the tournament.

Hugo Grenier won the title after defeating Hiroki Moriya 6–2, 6–3 in the final.

== Seeds ==
1. (France) Benoît Paire (first round)
2. (France) Richard Gasquet (second round)
3. (Czech Republic) Jiří Veselý (first round, retired)
4. (Sweden) Mikael Ymer (second round)
5. (Switzerland) Henri Laaksonen (first round)
6. (Austria) Dennis Novak (withdrew)
7. (Moldova) Radu Albot (quarterfinals)
8. (France) Antoine Hoang (first round)
9. (France) Hugo Grenier (champion)

== Draw ==
Key

- Q = Qualifier
- WC = Wild card
- LL = Lucky loser
- Alt = Alternate
- ITF = ITF entry
- PR = Protected ranking
- SR = Special ranking
- SE = Special exempt
- JE = Junior exempt
- JR = Junior Accelerator Programme entrant
- CO = College Accelerator Programme entrant
- NG = Next Gen Accelerator Program entrant
- w/o = Walkover
- r = Retired
- d = Defaulted

=== Finals ===
Semifinals
(Japan) Hiroki Moriya	6	6
(France) Manuel Guinard	2	3
(France) Mathias Bourgue	4	4
9	(France) Hugo Grenier	6	6

Final
(Japan) Hiroki Moriya	2	3
9	(France) Hugo Grenier	6	6

=== Top half ===
First round
1/WC	(France) B Paire	6^{4}	6	4
LL	(Netherlands) J Sels	7^{7}	3	6
Alt	(France) K Jacquet	4	2
(Belgium) K Coppejans	6	6
(Japan) H Moriya	3	6	7^{9}
(United States) A Ritschard	6	3	6^{7}
Q	(Ukraine) G Kravchenko	6	6
5	(Switzerland) H Laaksonen	4	4
3	(Czech Republic) J Veselý	5	2^{r}
(France) M Guinard	7	3
(Russia) A Kuznetsov	6	7
(France) A Müller	2	5
(Italy) A Arnaboldi	7	6
Q	(France) C Hemery	5	4
(Italy) T Fabbiano	6	6^{3}	6
8	(France) A Hoang	4	7^{7}	4

Second round
LL	(Netherlands) J Sels	6	6
(Belgium) K Coppejans	4	4
(Japan) H Moriya	3	6	7
Q	(Ukraine) G Kravchenko	6	4	5
(France) M Guinard	7^{7}	6^{5}	6
(Russia) A Kuznetsov	6^{5}	7^{7}	3
(Italy) A Arnaboldi	3	6	6
(Italy) T Fabbiano	6	2	4

Quarterfinals
LL	(Netherlands) J Sels	2	4
(Japan) H Moriya	6	6
(France) M Guinard	6	6
(Italy) A Arnaboldi	2	3

Semifinals
(Japan) H Moriya	6	6
(France) M Guinard	2	3

=== Bottom half ===
First round
7	(Moldova) R Albot	6	6
LL	(Italy) L Vanni	2	3
WC	(France) G Mpetshi Perricard	7^{7}	4	6
(Canada) S Diez	6^{3}	6	3
(France) M Bourgue	6	6
LL	(Ukraine) V Orlov	3	2
(France) G Blancaneaux	6	4	3
4	(Sweden) M Ymer	4	6	6
9	(France) H Grenier	6^{6}	6	6
(France) M Janvier	7^{8}	3	4
(Italy) A Pellegrino	6	2	3
Q	(France) G Debru	4	6	6
WC	(France) A Cazaux	6	6
PR	(Belgium) J Cagnina	2	2
(Italy) L Giustino	4	3
2	(France) R Gasquet	6	6

Second round
7	(Moldova) R Albot	6	6
WC	(France) G Mpetshi Perricard	4	4
(France) M Bourgue	6	4	6
4	(Sweden) M Ymer	0	6	4
9	(France) H Grenier	6	6
Q	(France) G Debru	2	3
WC	(France) A Cazaux	5	6	6
2	(France) R Gasquet	7	3	4

Quarterfinals
7	(Moldova) R Albot	3	6^{1}
(France) M Bourgue	6	7^{7}
9	(France) H Grenier	7^{7}	7
WC	(France) A Cazaux	6^{4}	5

Semifinals
(France) M Bourgue	4	4
9	(France) H Grenier	6	6
