= 2022 Open International de Tennis de Roanne =

- Date: 7–13 November
- Edition: 2nd
- Surface: Hard (indoor)
- Location: Roanne, France

Champions

Singles
- (France) Hugo Gaston

Doubles
- (France) Sadio Doumbia / (France) Fabien Reboul
← 2021 ·	Open International de Tennis de Roanne	· 2024 →

The 2022 Open International de Tennis de Roanne was a professional tennis tournament played on indoor hardcourts. It was the second edition of the tournament which was part of the 2022 ATP Challenger Tour. It took place in Roanne, France between 7 and 13 November 2022.

== Singles main-draw entrants ==
=== Seeds ===
Country	Player	Rank^{1}	Seed
MDA	Radu Albot	81	1
FRA	Hugo Gaston	84	2
	Pavel Kotov	98	3
AUS	Jason Kubler	104	4
GEO	Nikoloz Basilashvili	106	5
AUS	Alexei Popyrin	107	6
FRA	Hugo Grenier	118	7
ESP	Fernando Verdasco	119	8

- ^{1} Rankings are as of 31 October 2022.

=== Other entrants ===
The following players received wildcards into the singles main draw:

- (France) Ugo Blanchet
- (France) Arthur Fils
- (France) Giovanni Mpetshi Perricard

The following players received entry from the qualifying draw:

- (France) Mathias Bourgue
- (France) Antoine Hoang
- (France) Maxime Janvier
- Alibek Kachmazov
- (Bulgaria) Alexandar Lazarov
- (France) Valentin Royer

The following player received entry as a lucky loser:

- (Kazakhstan) Denis Yevseyev

== Champions ==
=== Singles ===
- (France) Hugo Gaston def. (Switzerland) Henri Laaksonen 6–7^{(6–8)}, 7–5, 6–1.

=== Doubles ===
- (France) Sadio Doumbia / (France) Fabien Reboul def. (Jamaica) Dustin Brown / (Poland) Szymon Walków 7–6^{(7–5)}, 6–4.
