= 2025 Open de Roanne – Doubles =

Doubles
- 2025 Open de Roanne

Final
- Champions: (United States) Vasil Kirkov (Netherlands) Bart Stevens
- Runners-up: (Belgium) Joran Vliegen (United States) Jackson Withrow
- Score: 4–6, 6–1, [10–4]

Events
| Singles | Doubles |
- Open de Roanne

Nicolás Barrientos and David Pel were the defending champions but only Barrientos chose to defend his title, partnering Mats Hermans. They lost in the first round to Joran Vliegen and Jackson Withrow.

Vasil Kirkov and Bart Stevens won the title after defeating Vliegen and Withrow 4–6, 6–1, [10–4] in the final.

== Seeds ==
1. (Belgium) Sander Gillé / (Netherlands) Sem Verbeek (first round)
2. (United States) Vasil Kirkov / (Netherlands) Bart Stevens (champions)
3. (Ecuador) Diego Hidalgo / (United States) Patrik Trhac (first round)
4. (Belgium) Joran Vliegen / (United States) Jackson Withrow (final)

== Draw ==
Key

- Q = Qualifier
- WC = Wild card
- LL = Lucky loser
- Alt = Alternate
- ITF = ITF entry
- PR = Protected ranking
- SR = Special ranking
- SE = Special exempt
- JE = Junior exempt
- JR = Junior Accelerator Programme entrant
- CO = College Accelerator Programme entrant
- NG = Next Gen Accelerator Program entrant
- w/o = Walkover
- r = Retired
- d = Defaulted

=== Draw ===
First round
1 | (Belgium) S Gillé (Netherlands) S Verbeek | 6^{2} | 6^{4}
(Canada) C Harper (United Kingdom) D Stevenson | 7^{7} | 7^{7}
(Norway) V Durasovic (Norway) L Hellum Lilleengen | 6 | 6
(Finland) Patrick Kaukovalta (Finland) O Virtanen | 3 | 2
4 | (Belgium) J Vliegen (United States) J Withrow | 6 | 6
(Colombia) N Barrientos (Netherlands) M Hermans | 3 | 2
(France) A Reymond (France) L Sanchez | 6^{7} | 6 | [8]
(Bulgaria) A Donski (Serbia) S Latinović | 7^{9} | 3 | [10]
(India) A Chandrasekar (United States) R Stalder | 6 | 3 | [10]
(Croatia) M Dodig (Austria) F Misolic | 1 | 6 | [6]
(Germany) H Jebens (United Kingdom) J Paris | 6 | 7^{7}
3 | (Ecuador) D Hidalgo (United States) P Trhac | 4 | 6^{4}
(Slovakia) M Karol (Ukraine) V Sachko | 6 | 7^{7}
(Poland) S Kielan (Poland) S Walków | 3 | 6^{5}
(France) D Added (Austria) N Oberleitner | 2 | 6^{2}
2 | (United States) V Kirkov (Netherlands) B Stevens | 6 | 7^{7}

Quarterfinals
(Canada) C Harper (United Kingdom) D Stevenson | 6 | 4 | [8]
(Norway) V Durasovic (Norway) L Hellum Lilleengen | 2 | 6 | [10]
4 | (Belgium) J Vliegen (United States) J Withrow | 6 | 6
(Bulgaria) A Donski (Serbia) S Latinović | 4 | 2
(India) A Chandrasekar (United States) R Stalder | 4 | 4
(Germany) H Jebens (United Kingdom) J Paris | 6 | 6
(Slovakia) M Karol (Ukraine) V Sachko | 6 | 1 | [9]
2 | (United States) V Kirkov (Netherlands) B Stevens | 3 | 6 | [11]

Semifinals
(Norway) V Durasovic (Norway) L Hellum Lilleengen | 3 | 4
4 | (Belgium) J Vliegen (United States) J Withrow | 6 | 6
(Germany) H Jebens (United Kingdom) J Paris | 7^{10} | 4 | [12]
2 | (United States) V Kirkov (Netherlands) B Stevens | 6^{8} | 6 | [14]

Final
4 | (Belgium) J Vliegen (United States) J Withrow | 6 | 1 | [4]
2 | (United States) V Kirkov (Netherlands) B Stevens | 4 | 6 | [10]
