= 2025 Open de Roanne =

- Date: 6–12 October
- Edition: 4th
- Surface: Hard (indoor)
- Location: Roanne, France

Champions

Singles
- (Finland) Otto Virtanen

Doubles
- (United States) Vasil Kirkov / (Netherlands) Bart Stevens
← 2024 ·	Open de Roanne	· 2026 →

The 2025 Open Auvergne-Rhône-Alpes de Roanne was a professional tennis tournament played on indoor hardcourts. It was the fourth edition of the tournament which was part of the 2025 ATP Challenger Tour. It took place in Roanne, France between 6 and 12 October 2025.

== Singles main-draw entrants ==
=== Seeds ===
Country	Player	Rank^{1}	Seed
GBR	Jacob Fearnley	80	1
AUS	Jordan Thompson	85	2
AUT	Filip Misolic	95	3
GER	Jan-Lennard Struff	98	4
FRA	Hugo Gaston	101	5
ESP	Pablo Carreño Busta	123	6
BEL	Alexander Blockx	128	7
ITA	Francesco Passaro	139	8

- ^{1} Rankings are as of 29 September 2025.

=== Other entrants ===
The following players received wildcards into the singles main draw:

- (France) Dan Added
- (Switzerland) Henry Bernet
- (France) Tom Paris

The following player received entry into the singles main draw through the Next Gen Accelerator programme:

- (Croatia) Matej Dodig

The following players received entry into the singles main draw as alternates:

- (Germany) Justin Engel
- (Croatia) Borna Gojo

The following players received entry from the qualifying draw:

- (Switzerland) Mika Brunold
- (Norway) Viktor Durasovic
- (Estonia) Daniil Glinka
- (France) Matteo Martineau
- (Greece) Stefanos Sakellaridis
- (Switzerland) Dominic Stricker

The following players received entry as lucky losers:

- (Slovakia) Miloš Karol
- (Netherlands) Jelle Sels

== Champions ==
=== Singles ===
- (Finland) Otto Virtanen def. (France) Hugo Gaston 6–1, 3–6, 6–3.

=== Doubles ===
- (United States) Vasil Kirkov / (Netherlands) Bart Stevens def. (Belgium) Joran Vliegen / (United States) Jackson Withrow 4–6, 6–1, [10–4].
