= 2021 Open International de Tennis de Roanne – Doubles =

Doubles
- 2021 Open International de Tennis de Roanne

Final
- Champions: (United Kingdom) Lloyd Glasspool (Finland) Harri Heliövaara
- Runners-up: (Monaco) Romain Arneodo (France) Albano Olivetti
- Score: 7–6^{(7–5)}, 6–7^{(5–7)}, [12–10]

Events
Singles	Doubles
Open International de Tennis de Roanne	· 2022 →

This was the first edition of the tournament.

Lloyd Glasspool and Harri Heliövaara won the title after defeating Romain Arneodo and Albano Olivetti 7–6^{(7–5)}, 6–7^{(5–7)}, [12–10] in the final.

== Seeds ==
1. (United Kingdom) Lloyd Glasspool / (Finland) Harri Heliövaara (champions)
2. (Monaco) Romain Arneodo / (France) Albano Olivetti (final)
3. (France) Sadio Doumbia / (France) Fabien Reboul (semifinals)
4. (France) Manuel Guinard / (France) Antoine Hoang (quarterfinals)

== Draw ==
=== Key ===
- Q = Qualifier
- WC = Wild card
- LL = Lucky loser
- Alt = Alternate
- SE = Special exempt
- PR = Protected ranking
- ITF = ITF entry
- JE = Junior exempt
- w/o = Walkover
- r = Retired
- d = Defaulted
- SR = Special ranking

First round
1	(United Kingdom) L Glasspool (Finland) H Heliövaara	w/o
(Canada) S Diez (Spain) D Vega Hernández
WC	(France) K de Schepper (France) A Reymond	2	4
(Poland) K Drzewiecki (Poland) P Matuszewski	6	6
4	(France) M Guinard (France) A Hoang	w/o
(Ukraine) V Orlov (Russia) A Vatutin
(United Kingdom) E Hoyt (Switzerland) L Margaroli	3	2
(Italy) A Arnaboldi (Italy) A Pellegrino	6	6
(Belgium) K Coppejans (Belgium) M Geerts	4	6	[8]
(United States) J Cerretani (Romania) VV Cornea	6	3	[10]
WC	(France) A Fils (France) G Mpetshi Perricard	2	3
3	(France) S Doumbia (France) F Reboul	6	6
WC	(France) K Jacquet (France) Hugo Voljacques	4	7^{7}	[7]
(Netherlands) J Sels (Netherlands) G Smits	6	6^{4}	[10]
(France) G Blancaneaux (New Zealand) A Sitak	4	6^{5}
2	(Monaco) R Arneodo (France) A Olivetti	6	7^{7}

Quarterfinals
1	(United Kingdom) L Glasspool (Finland) H Heliövaara	6	6
(Poland) K Drzewiecki (Poland) P Matuszewski	3	0
4	(France) M Guinard (France) A Hoang	5	1
(Italy) A Arnaboldi (Italy) A Pellegrino	7	6
(United States) J Cerretani (Romania) VV Cornea	3	4
3	(France) S Doumbia (France) F Reboul	6	6
(Netherlands) J Sels (Netherlands) G Smits	6^{4}	4
2	(Monaco) R Arneodo (France) A Olivetti	7^{7}	6

Semifinals
1	(United Kingdom) L Glasspool (Finland) H Heliövaara	6	6
(Italy) A Arnaboldi (Italy) A Pellegrino	3	1
3	(France) S Doumbia (France) F Reboul	6^{5}	3
2	(Monaco) R Arneodo (France) A Olivetti	7^{7}	6

Final
1	(United Kingdom) L Glasspool (Finland) H Heliövaara	7^{7}	6^{5}	[12]
2	(Monaco) R Arneodo (France) A Olivetti	6^{5}	7^{7}	[10]
