= 2024 Open de Roanne – Doubles =

Doubles
- 2024 Open de Roanne

Final
- Champions: (Colombia) Nicolás Barrientos (Netherlands) David Pel
- Runners-up: (Switzerland) Jakub Paul (Czech Republic) Matěj Vocel
- Score: 4–6, 6–3, [10–6]

Events
Singles	Doubles
- Open de Roanne

Sadio Doumbia and Fabien Reboul were the defending champions but chose not to defend their title.

Nicolás Barrientos and David Pel won the title after defeating Jakub Paul and Matěj Vocel 4–6, 6–3, [10–6] in the final.

== Seeds ==
1. (Germany) Constantin Frantzen / (Germany) Hendrik Jebens (first round)
2. (Austria) Alexander Erler / (Germany) Andreas Mies (quarterfinals, withdrew)
3. (India) Sriram Balaji / (Kazakhstan) Aleksandr Nedovyesov (semifinals)
4. (Netherlands) Robin Haase / (Austria) Lucas Miedler (semifinals)

== Draw ==
Key

- Q = Qualifier
- WC = Wild card
- LL = Lucky loser
- Alt = Alternate
- ITF = ITF entry
- PR = Protected ranking
- SR = Special ranking
- SE = Special exempt
- JE = Junior exempt
- JR = Junior Accelerator Programme entrant
- CO = College Accelerator Programme entrant
- NG = Next Gen Accelerator Program entrant
- w/o = Walkover
- r = Retired
- d = Defaulted

=== Draw ===
First round
1	(Germany) C Frantzen (Germany) H Jebens	4	6^{3}
(France) G Barrère (France) J Eysseric	6	7^{7}
(Ecuador) G Escobar (Ecuador) D Hidalgo	3	4
(Switzerland) J Paul (Czech Republic) M Vocel	6	6
3	(India) S Balaji (Kazakhstan) A Nedovyesov	4	6	[13]
WC	(France) G Blancaneaux (France) T Lamasine	6	1	[11]
(Brazil) M Demoliner (United States) C Harrison	6	6
WC	(France) A Bouquier (France) T Papamalamis	3	4
Alt	(Czech Republic) Jakub Nicod (Ukraine) V Sachko	2	4
(Denmark) A Holmgren (Denmark) J Ingildsen	6	6
(Germany) J Schnaitter (Germany) M Wallner	6^{8}	3
4	(Netherlands) R Haase (Austria) L Miedler	7^{10}	6
(Colombia) N Barrientos (Netherlands) D Pel	6	6
(France) C Chidekh (France) L Sanchez	4	3

Quarterfinals
(France) G Barrère (France) J Eysseric	6^{3}	5
(Switzerland) J Paul (Czech Republic) M Vocel	7^{7}	7
3	(India) S Balaji (Kazakhstan) A Nedovyesov	6	6
(Brazil) M Demoliner (United States) C Harrison	4	4
(Denmark) A Holmgren (Denmark) J Ingildsen	6	4	[8]
4	(Netherlands) R Haase (Austria) L Miedler	3	6	[10]
(Colombia) N Barrientos (Netherlands) D Pel	w/o
2	(Austria) A Erler (Germany) A Mies

Semifinals
(Switzerland) J Paul (Czech Republic) M Vocel	6	6
3	(India) S Balaji (Kazakhstan) A Nedovyesov	2	4
4	(Netherlands) R Haase (Austria) L Miedler	4	3
(Colombia) N Barrientos (Netherlands) D Pel	6	6

Final
(Switzerland) J Paul (Czech Republic) M Vocel	6	3	[6]
(Colombia) N Barrientos (Netherlands) D Pel	4	6	[10]
