= 2021 Open International de Tennis de Roanne =

- Date: 8–14 November
- Edition: 1st
- Surface: Hard (Indoor)
- Location: Roanne, France

Champions

Singles
- (France) Hugo Grenier

Doubles
- (United Kingdom) Lloyd Glasspool / (Finland) Harri Heliövaara
- Open International de Tennis de Roanne

The 2021 Open International de Tennis de Roanne was a professional tennis tournament played on indoor hardcourts. It was the first edition of the tournament which was part of the 2021 ATP Challenger Tour. It took place in Roanne, France between 8 and 14 November 2021.

== Singles main-draw entrants ==
=== Seeds ===
| Country | Player | Rank^{1} | Seed |
|---|---|---|---|
| FRA | Benoît Paire | 47 | 1 |
| FRA | Richard Gasquet | 74 | 2 |
| CZE | Jiří Veselý | 86 | 3 |
| SWE | Mikael Ymer | 97 | 4 |
| SUI | Henri Laaksonen | 98 | 5 |
| ~~AUT~~ | ~~Dennis Novak~~ | ~~107~~ | ~~6~~ |
| MDA | Radu Albot | 127 | 7 |
| FRA | Antoine Hoang | 168 | 8 |
| FRA | Hugo Grenier | 183 | 9 |

- ^{1} Rankings are as of 1 November 2021.

=== Other entrants ===
The following players received wildcards into the singles main draw:

- (France) Arthur Cazaux
- (France) Giovanni Mpetshi Perricard
- (France) Benoît Paire

The following player received entry into the singles main draw using a protected ranking:

- (Belgium) Julien Cagnina

The following player received entry into the singles main draw as an alternate:

- (France) Kyrian Jacquet

The following players received entry from the qualifying draw:

- (France) Gabriel Debru
- (France) Calvin Hemery
- (Ukraine) Georgii Kravchenko
- ~~(Russia) Alexey Vatutin~~

The following players received entry as lucky losers:

- (Ukraine) Vladyslav Orlov
- (Netherlands) Jelle Sels
- (Italy) Luca Vanni

== Champions ==
=== Singles ===
- (France) Hugo Grenier def. (Japan) Hiroki Moriya 6–2, 6–3.

=== Doubles ===
- (United Kingdom) Lloyd Glasspool / (Finland) Harri Heliövaara def. (Monaco) Romain Arneodo / (France) Albano Olivetti 7–6^{(7–5)}, 6–7^{(5–7)}, [12–10].
