= 2024 Open de Roanne =

- Date: 6–13 October
- Edition: 3rd
- Surface: Hard (indoor)
- Location: Roanne, France

Champions

Singles
- (France) Benjamin Bonzi

Doubles
- (Colombia) Nicolás Barrientos / (Netherlands) David Pel
← 2022 ·	Open de Roanne	· 2025 →

The 2024 Open Auvergne-Rhône-Alpes de Roanne, was a professional tennis tournament played on indoor hardcourts. It was the third edition of the tournament which was part of the 2024 ATP Challenger Tour. It took place in Roanne, France between 6 and 13 October 2024.

== Singles main-draw entrants ==
=== Seeds ===
Country	Player	Rank^{1}	Seed
GBR	Cameron Norrie	52	1
~~FRA~~	~~Quentin Halys~~	~~100~~	~~2~~
ITA	Mattia Bellucci	101	3
CRO	Duje Ajduković	117	4
FRA	Luca Van Assche	121	5
FRA	Pierre-Hugues Herbert	123	6
~~FRA~~	~~Lucas Pouille~~	~~125~~	~~7~~
FRA	Constant Lestienne	138	8

- ^{1} Rankings are as of 30 September 2024.

=== Other entrants ===
The following players received wildcards into the singles main draw:

- (France) Gabriel Debru
- (France) Théo Papamalamis
- (France) Luca Van Assche

The following players received entry into the singles main draw as alternates:

- (France) Clément Chidekh
- (France) Calvin Hemery
- (France) Matteo Martineau

The following players received entry from the qualifying draw:

- (France) Robin Bertrand
- (France) Étienne Donnet
- (Spain) David Jordà Sanchis
- (Ukraine) Vitaliy Sachko
- (Netherlands) Jelle Sels
- (Sweden) Elias Ymer

The following players received entry as lucky losers:

- (Switzerland) Antoine Bellier
- (Czech Republic) Jiří Veselý

== Champions ==
=== Singles ===
- (France) Benjamin Bonzi def. (France) Matteo Martineau 7–5, 6–1.

=== Doubles ===
- (Colombia) Nicolás Barrientos / (Netherlands) David Pel def. (Switzerland) Jakub Paul / (Czech Republic) Matěj Vocel 4–6, 6–3, [10–6].
