= 2026 Open de Roanne =

- Date: 12–18 October
- Edition: 5th
- Surface: Hard (indoor)
- Location: Roanne, France

Champions

Singles
- (Switzerland) Mika Brunold

Doubles
- (Monaco) Romain Arneodo / (Germany) Hendrik Jebens
- Open de Roanne

The 2026 Open Auvergne-Rhône-Alpes de Roanne was a professional tennis tournament played on indoor hardcourts. It was the fifth edition of the tournament which was part of the 2026 ATP Challenger Tour. It took place in Roanne, France between 12 and 18 October 2026.

== Singles main-draw entrants ==
=== Seeds ===
Country	Player	Rank^{1}	Seed
FRA	Hugo Gaston	89	1
FRA	Benjamin Bonzi	92	2
FIN	Otto Virtanen	107	3
FRA	Giovanni Mpetshi Perricard	108	4
FRA	Clément Chidekh	146	5
NOR	Nicolai Budkov Kjær	152	6
FRA	Clément Tabur	160	7
BEL	Gauthier Onclin	168	8

- ^{1} Rankings are as of 5 October 2026.

=== Other entrants ===
The following players received wildcards into the singles main draw:

- (France) Matisse Bobichon
- (France) Mathys Domenc
- (France) Daniel Jade

The following player received entry into the singles main draw through the Next Gen Accelerator programme:

- (Germany) Max Schönhaus

The following players received entry into the singles main draw as alternates:

- (France) Hugo Grenier
- (Switzerland) Jérôme Kym

The following players received entry from the qualifying draw:

- (Switzerland) Henry Bernet
- (France) Ugo Blanchet
- (France) Étienne Donnet
- (Slovakia) Norbert Gombos
- (France) Tom Paris
- (Switzerland) Jakub Paul

== Champions ==
=== Singles ===
- (Switzerland) Mika Brunold def. (France) Matteo Martineau 2–6, 7–6^{(7–5)}, 6–1.

=== Doubles ===
- (Monaco) Romain Arneodo / (Germany) Hendrik Jebens def. (United Kingdom) David Stevenson / (United Kingdom) Marcus Willis 6–4, 6–4.
