= Romain Arneodo =

French tennis player representing Monaco

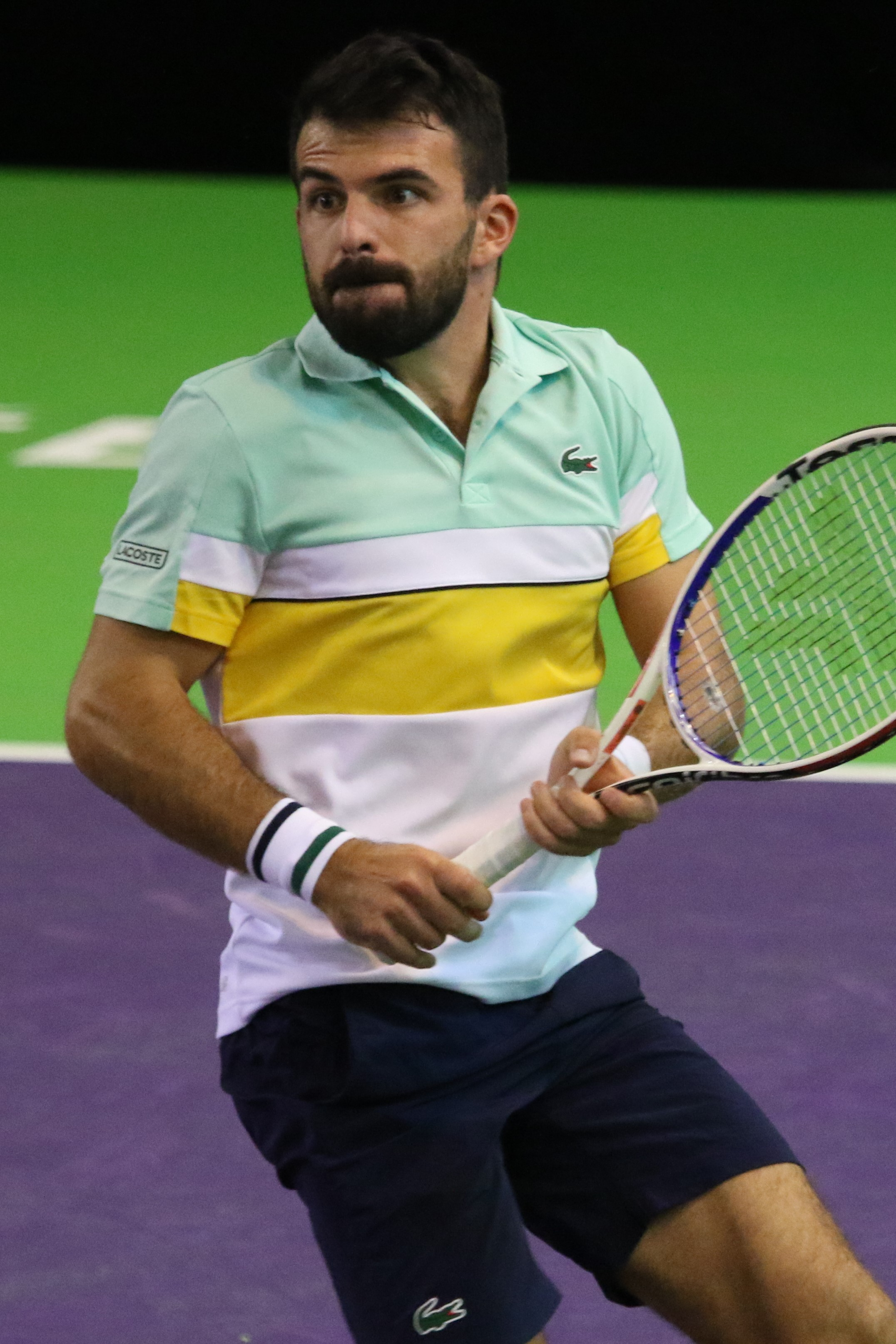
- Arneodo in 2021
- Full name: Romain Arneodo
- Country (sports): France (2008–2013); Monaco (2013–present)
- Residence: Monte Carlo, Monaco
- Born: 4 August 1992 (age 34) Cannes, France
- Plays: Right-handed (two handed-backhand)
- Coach: Guillaume Couillard
- Prize money: US $ 1,028,247

Singles
- Career record: 8–6
- Career titles: 0
- Highest ranking: No. 455 (25 August 2014)

Doubles
- Career record: 82–112
- Career titles: 4
- Highest ranking: No. 38 (25 August 2025)
- Current ranking: No. 45 (6 April 2026)

Grand Slam doubles results
- Australian Open: 1R (2021, 2022, 2024, 2025, 2026)
- French Open: 3R (2021)
- Wimbledon: 2R (2023, 2024)
- US Open: 1R (2018, 2023, 2025, 2026)
Medal record
Men's tennis
Representing Monaco
Games of the Small States of Europe
| Gold medal – first place | 2019 Budva | Singles |
| Silver medal – second place | 2019 Budva | Doubles |
- Last updated on: 6 April 2026.

Romain Arneodo (born 4 August 1992) is a French-born Monégasque professional tennis player who specializes in doubles. He has a career-high ATP doubles ranking of world No. 38 reached on 25 August 2025 and a singles ranking of world No. 455 on 25 August 2014. He won the Monte-Carlo Masters doubles title in 2025, with Manuel Guinard, becoming the first Monégasque champion at the tournament. From 2008 to 2013, he represented France in international competitions, but has since represented Monaco.

== Career ==
Arneodo made his ATP main draw debut at the 2014 Monte-Carlo Rolex Masters in the doubles tournament with partner Benjamin Balleret. The pair entered the main draw with a wildcard and reached the quarterfinals after defeating the pairs of Jean-Julien Rojer and Horia Tecău and Roberto Bautista Agut and Andreas Seppi in three sets before bowing out to fifth seeds Daniel Nestor and Nenad Zimonjić in straight sets.

Three years later, in 2017, Arneodo went one step further in Monte Carlo with partner Hugo Nys by reaching the semifinals after defeating the pairs of Pablo Carreño Busta and Guillermo García López, eighth seeds Rojer and Tecău, and third seeds Jamie Murray and Bruno Soares.

In 2019, at the Los Cabos Open, Arneodo teamed up with Nys and they defeated Dominic Inglot and Austin Krajicek in the final to win each their own maiden ATP doubles title together; the duo won all four matches in three sets en route to the title.

Six years after reaching his first ATP Masters 1000 doubles semifinal in 2017, Arneodo became the first Monegasque player to contend for the Monte-Carlo Masters doubles title in the tournament's history by reaching the 2023 final. With partner Sam Weissborn, they defeated Marcelo Melo and Alexander Zverev before they upset defending champions and second seeds Rajeev Ram and Joe Salisbury, sixth seeds Lloyd Glasspool and Harri Heliövaara, and Kevin Krawietz and Tim Pütz to enter into their maiden Masters doubles final. The Monegasque/Austrian wildcards lost to Ivan Dodig and Austin Krajicek, though their results earned Arneodo his top 55 debut on 24 April 2023.

Two years later he reached the semifinal at his home Masters tournament at the Monte Carlo Country Club for the third time partnering this time Manuel Guinard, also as a wildcard pair, defeating Rohan Bopanna and Ben Shelton. He reached again the final upsetting second seeds Harri Heliovaara and Henry Patten. Arneodo and Guinard won their maiden Masters title defeating Lloyd Glasspool and Julian Cash. Arneodo became the first Monégasque player to win the Monte-Carlo Masters. It was only the pair's second tournament playing together.

== Significant finals ==
=== Masters 1000 tournaments ===
==== Doubles: 2 (1 title, 1 runner-up) ====
| Result | Year | Tournament | Surface | Partner | Opponents | Score |
|---|---|---|---|---|---|---|
| Loss | 2023 | Monte-Carlo Masters | Clay | (Austria) Sam Weissborn | (Croatia) Ivan Dodig (United States) Austin Krajicek | 0–6, 6–4, [12–14] |
| Win | 2025 | Monte-Carlo Masters | Clay | (France) Manuel Guinard | (United Kingdom) Julian Cash (United Kingdom) Lloyd Glasspool | 1–6, 7–6^{(10–8)}, [10–8] |

== ATP Tour finals ==
=== Doubles: 6 (4 titles, 2 runner-ups) ===
| Legend Grand Slam (0–0) ATP Masters 1000 (1–1) ATP 500 (0–0) ATP 250 (3–1) | Finals by surface Hard (1–0) Clay (3–2) Grass (0–0) | Finals by setting Outdoor (4–2) Indoor (0–0) |

| Result | W–L | Date | Tournament | Tier | Surface | Partner | Opponents | Score |
|---|---|---|---|---|---|---|---|---|
| Win | 1–0 | Aug 2019 | Los Cabos Open, Mexico | ATP 250 | Hard | (Monaco) Hugo Nys | (United Kingdom) Dominic Inglot (United States) Austin Krajicek | 7–5, 5–7, [16–14] |
| Loss | 1–1 | Feb 2021 | Córdoba Open, Argentina | ATP 250 | Clay | (France) Benoît Paire | (Brazil) Rafael Matos (Brazil) Felipe Meligeni Alves | 4–6, 1–6 |
| Loss | 1–2 | Apr 2023 | Monte-Carlo Masters, Monaco | Masters 1000 | Clay | (Austria) Sam Weissborn | (Croatia) Ivan Dodig (United States) Austin Krajicek | 0–6, 6–4, [12–14] |
| Win | 2–2 | Apr 2025 | Monte-Carlo Masters, Monaco | Masters 1000 | Clay | (France) Manuel Guinard | (United Kingdom) Julian Cash (United Kingdom) Lloyd Glasspool | 1–6, 7–6^{(10–8)}, [10–8] |
| Win | 3–2 | Jul 2025 | Croatia Open, Croatia | ATP 250 | Clay | (France) Manuel Guinard | (United States) Patrik Trhac (United Kingdom) Marcus Willis | 7–5, 7–6^{(7–2)} |
| Win | 4–2 | May 2026 | Geneva Open, Switzerland | ATP 250 | Clay | (Australia) Marc Polmans | (India) Yuki Bhambri (New Zealand) Michael Venus | 3–6, 7–6^{(7–2)}, [10–7] |

== ATP Challenger and ITF Futures finals ==
=== Singles: 4 (1 title, 3 runner-ups) ===
| Legend ATP Challenger Tour (0–0) ITF Futures (1–3) | Finals by surface Hard (0–0) Clay (1–3) |

| Result | W–L | Date | Tournament | Tier | Surface | Opponent | Score |
|---|---|---|---|---|---|---|---|
| Loss | 0–1 | Jul 2012 | Turkey F27, İzmir | Futures | Clay | (Serbia) Miljan Zekić | 5–7, 1–6 |
| Win | 1–1 | Oct 2013 | USA F28, Birmingham, Alabama | Futures | Clay | (Chile) Hans Podlipnik Castillo | 6–4, 1–6, 6–0 |
| Loss | 1–2 | Aug 2014 | Finland F2, Hyvinkää | Futures | Clay | (Finland) Henrik Sillanpää | 4–6, 6–4, 2–6 |
| Loss | 1–3 | May 2015 | France F9, Grasse | Futures | Clay | (France) Maxime Chazal | 2–6, 5–7 |

=== Doubles: 66 (39 titles, 27 runner-ups) ===
| Legend ATP Challenger Tour (19–20) ITF Futures (20–7) | Finals by surface Hard (16–12) Clay (23–15) |

| Result | W–L | Date | Tournament | Tier | Surface | Partner | Opponents | Score |
|---|---|---|---|---|---|---|---|---|
| Win | 1–0 | Sep 2012 | Italy F26, Siena | Futures | Clay | (France) Jérôme Inzerillo | (Italy) Marco Crugnola (Russia) Mikhail Vasiliev | 6–2, 6–2 |
| Loss | 1–1 | Nov 2012 | USA F32, Bradenton, Florida | Futures | Clay | (Monaco) Benjamin Balleret | (Tunisia) Haythem Abid (United States) Ryan Thacher | 3–6, 6–3, [4–10] |
| Win | 2–1 | Mar 2013 | France F6, Saint-Raphaël, Var | Futures | Hard (i) | (France) Hugo Nys | (France) Simon Cauvard (France) Alexandre Penaud | 6–7^{(6–8)}, 6–4, [10–5] |
| Win | 3–1 | Mar 2013 | Romania F1, Cluj-Napoca | Futures | Clay | (Monaco) Benjamin Balleret | (Poland) Marcin Gawron (Poland) Andriej Kapaś | 0–6, 6–4, [10–8] |
| Loss | 3–2 | Jun 2013 | Serbia F2, Belgrade | Futures | Clay | (France) Hugo Nys | (Slovakia) Patrik Fabian (Slovakia) Adrian Partl | 4–6, 1–6 |
| Win | 4–2 | Aug 2013 | Poland F4, Poznań | Futures | Clay | (Monaco) Benjamin Balleret | (Poland) Phillip Gresk (Poland) Kamil Majchrzak | 6–2, 6–4 |
| Win | 5–2 | Sep 2013 | Georgia F1, Telavi | Futures | Clay | (Monaco) Benjamin Balleret | (Poland) Arkadiusz Kocyla (Poland) Błażej Koniusz | 7–6^{(7–5)}, 6–0 |
| Win | 6–2 | Sep 2013 | Georgia F2, Telavi | Futures | Clay | (Monaco) Benjamin Balleret | (Poland) Arkadiusz Kocyla (Poland) Błażej Koniusz | 7–5, 6–2 |
| Win | 7–2 | Oct 2013 | USA F28, Birmingham, Alabama | Futures | Clay | (Monaco) Benjamin Balleret | (United States) Sekou Bangoura (United States) Evan King | 6–7^{(4–7)}, 6–4, [10–7] |
| Win | 8–2 | Feb 2014 | Turkey F4, Antalya | Futures | Hard | (France) Enzo Couacaud | (United Kingdom) Richard Gabb (United Kingdom) Jonny O'Mara | 6–3, 6–0 |
| Win | 9–2 | Mar 2014 | France F7, Saint-Raphaël, Var | Futures | Hard (i) | (Monaco) Benjamin Balleret | (France) Fabrice Martin (France) Hugo Nys | 6–2, 7–6^{(7–2)} |
| Loss | 9–3 | Jun 2014 | Belgium F3, Limelette | Futures | Clay | (Germany) Peter Torebko | (Belgium) Romain Barbosa (Belgium) Romain Bogaerts | 2–6, 4–6 |
| Win | 10–3 | Jul 2014 | Bulgaria F5, Plovdiv | Futures | Clay | (Switzerland) Luca Margaroli | (Bulgaria) Dinko Halachev (Bulgaria) Vasko Mladenov | 7–6^{(7–4)}, 6–4 |
| Win | 11–3 | Oct 2014 | Peru F7, Lima | Futures | Clay | (Monaco) Benjamin Balleret | (Peru) Jorge Brian Panta (Argentina) Eduardo Agustín Torre | 4–6, 6–3, [10–1] |
| Win | 12–3 | Oct 2014 | Peru F9, Lima | Futures | Clay | (Monaco) Benjamin Balleret | (Brazil) Eduardo Dischinger (Brazil) Tiago Lopes | 6–3, 7–5 |
| Win | 13–3 | Jan 2015 | USA F1, Plantation, Florida | Futures | Clay | (Monaco) Benjamin Balleret | (Sweden) Markus Eriksson (Sweden) Patrik Rosenholm | 6–7^{(3–7)}, 6–3, [10–7] |
| Win | 14–3 | Jan 2015 | USA F3, Sunrise, Florida | Futures | Clay | (Monaco) Benjamin Balleret | (Ecuador) Emilio Gómez (United States) Connor Smith | 6–2, 7–5 |
| Win | 15–3 | Jan 2015 | USA F5, Weston, Florida | Futures | Clay | (Monaco) Benjamin Balleret | (El Salvador) Marcelo Arévalo (Venezuela) Luis David Martínez | 7–5, 7–6^{(7–2)} |
| Win | 16–3 | Feb 2015 | USA F6, Palm Coast, Florida | Futures | Clay | (Monaco) Benjamin Balleret | (Sweden) Markus Eriksson (Sweden) Patrik Rosenholm | 7–5, 7–6^{(7–3)} |
| Loss | 0–1 | Feb 2015 | Santo Domingo, Dominican Republic | Challenger | Clay | (Monaco) Benjamin Balleret | (Venezuela) Roberto Maytín (Chile) Hans Podlipnik Castillo | 3–6, 6–2, [4–10] |
| Win | 17–3 | Mar 2015 | Morocco F1, Casablanca | Futures | Clay | (France) Florent Diep | (France) Samuel Bensoussan (Germany) Yannick Maden | 6–3, 6–7^{(2–7)}, [10–8] |
| Win | 18–3 | Jun 2015 | France F10, Mont-de-Marsan | Futures | Clay | (France) Hugo Nys | (France) Théo Fournerie (France) Louis Tessa | 6–1, 7–5 |
| Loss | 18–4 | Jul 2015 | Belgium F4, De Haan | Futures | Clay | (Republic of Ireland) Sam Barry | (United States) Hunter Johnson (United States) Yates Johnson | 4–6, 6–4, [3–10] |
| Win | 19–4 | Aug 2015 | France F16, Ajaccio | Futures | Hard | (France) Hugo Nys | (Thailand) Sanchai Ratiwatana (Thailand) Sonchat Ratiwatana | 2–6, 6–4, [10–5] |
| Loss | 19–5 | Aug 2015 | Finland F2, Hyvinkää | Futures | Clay | (France) Maxime Janvier | (United Kingdom) Lloyd Glasspool (Denmark) Mikael Torpegaard | 6–7^{(3–7)}, 2–6 |
| Loss | 19–6 | Jun 2016 | France F10, Mont-de-Marsan | Futures | Clay | (Monaco) Benjamin Balleret | (France) Benjamin Bonzi (France) Grégoire Jacq | 6–7^{(4–7)}, 6–7^{(11–13)} |
| Win | 20–6 | Jul 2016 | France F16, Ajaccio | Futures | Hard | (France) Hugo Nys | (France) Romain Jouan (France) Joan Soler | 7–5, 6–2 |
| Win | 1–1 | Aug 2017 | Manerbio, Italy | Challenger | Clay | (France) Hugo Nys | (Russia) Mikhail Elgin (Czech Republic) Roman Jebavý | 4–6, 7–6^{(7–3)}, [10–5] |
| Loss | 1–2 | Sep 2017 | Istanbul, Turkey | Challenger | Hard | (France) Hugo Nys | (Germany) Andre Begemann (France) Jonathan Eysseric | 3–6, 7–5, [4–10] |
| Win | 2–2 | Nov 2017 | Montevideo, Uruguay | Challenger | Clay | (Brazil) Fernando Romboli | (Uruguay) Ariel Behar (Brazil) Fabiano de Paula | 2–6, 6–4, [10–8] |
| Loss | 20–7 | Jan 2018 | France F1, Bagnoles-de-l'Orne | Futures | Clay (i) | (France) Grégoire Jacq | (Belgium) Niels Desein (Netherlands) Boy Westerhof | 6–4, 3–6, [8–10] |
| Win | 3–2 | Jan 2018 | Koblenz, Germany | Challenger | Hard (i) | (Austria) Tristan-Samuel Weissborn | (Netherlands) Sander Arends (Croatia) Antonio Šančić | 6–7^{(4–7)}, 7–5, [10–6] |
| Win | 4–2 | Feb 2018 | Cherbourg, France | Challenger | Hard (i) | (Austria) Tristan-Samuel Weissborn | (Croatia) Antonio Šančić (United Kingdom) Ken Skupski | 6–3, 1–6, [10–4] |
| Win | 5–2 | Mar 2018 | Santiago, Chile | Challenger | Clay | (France) Jonathan Eysseric | (Argentina) Guido Andreozzi (Argentina) Guillermo Durán | 7–6^{(7–4)}, 1–6, [12–10] |
| Loss | 5–3 | May 2018 | Mestre, Italy | Challenger | Clay | (Serbia) Danilo Petrović | (Croatia) Marin Draganja (Croatia) Tomislav Draganja | 4–6, 7–6^{(7–2)}, [2–10] |
| Loss | 5–4 | Nov 2018 | Mouilleron-le-Captif, France | Challenger | Hard (i) | (France) Quentin Halys | (Belgium) Sander Gillé (Belgium) Joran Vliegen | 3–6, 6–4, [2–10] |
| Win | 6–4 | Jan 2019 | Orlando, USA | Challenger | Hard | (Belarus) Andrei Vasilevski | (Portugal) Gonçalo Oliveira (Italy) Andrea Vavassori | 7–6^{(7–2)}, 2–6, [15–13] |
| Loss | 6–5 | Jan 2019 | Newport Beach, USA | Challenger | Hard | (Belarus) Andrei Vasilevski | (United States) Robert Galloway (United States) Nathaniel Lammons | 5–7, 6–7^{(1–7)} |
| Win | 7–5 | Feb 2019 | Cleveland, USA | Challenger | Hard | (Belarus) Andrei Vasilevski | (United States) Robert Galloway (United States) Nathaniel Lammons | 6–4, 7–6^{(7–4)} |
| Win | 8–5 | Mar 2019 | Lille, France | Challenger | Hard | (France) Hugo Nys | (Israel) Jonathan Erlich (France) Fabrice Martin | 7–5, 5–7, [10–8] |
| Loss | 8–6 | May 2019 | Bordeaux, France | Challenger | Clay | (Monaco) Hugo Nys | (France) Grégoire Barrère (France) Quentin Halys | 4–6, 1–6 |
| Win | 9–6 | Sep 2019 | Orléans, France | Challenger | Hard | (Monaco) Hugo Nys | (Chile) Hans Podlipnik Castillo (Austria) Tristan-Samuel Weissborn | 6–7^{(5–7)}, 6–3, [10–1] |
| Loss | 9–7 | Apr 2021 | Marbella, Spain | Challenger | Clay | (Monaco) Hugo Nys | (United Kingdom) Dominic Inglot (Australia) Matt Reid | 6-1, 3-6, [6-10] |
| Loss | 9–8 | Sep 2021 | Saint-Tropez, France | Challenger | Hard | (France) Manuel Guinard | (Croatia) Antonio Šančić (New Zealand) Artem Sitak | 6–7^{(5–7)}, 4–6 |
| Loss | 9–9 | Oct 2021 | Alicante, Spain | Challenger | Hard | (Australia) Matt Reid | (Ukraine) Denys Molchanov (Spain) David Vega Hernández | 4-6, 2-6 |
| Loss | 9–10 | Nov 2021 | Roanne, France | Challenger | Hard (i) | (France) Albano Olivetti | (United Kingdom) Lloyd Glasspool (Finland) Harri Heliövaara | 6-7^{(5-7)}, 7-6^{(7-5)}, [10-12] |
| Win | 10–10 | Nov 2021 | Pau, France | Challenger | Hard (i) | (Austria) Tristan-Samuel Weissborn | (Pakistan) Aisam-ul-Haq Qureshi (Spain) David Vega Hernández | 6-4, 6-2 |
| Win | 11–10 | Jun 2022 | Lyon, France | Challenger | Clay | (France) Jonathan Eysseric | (Netherlands) Sander Arends (Netherlands) David Pel | 7–5, 4–6, [10–4] |
| Loss | 11–11 | Jun 2022 | Blois, France | Challenger | Clay | (France) Jonathan Eysseric | (India) Sriram Balaji (India) Jeevan Nedunchezhiyan | 4-6, 7-6^{(7-3)}, [7-10] |
| Loss | 11–12 | Jul 2022 | Todi, Italy | Challenger | Clay | (France) Jonathan Eysseric | (Argentina) Guido Andreozzi (Argentina) Guillermo Durán | 1-6, 6-2, [6-10] |
| Loss | 11–13 | Sep 2022 | Cassis, France | Challenger | Hard | (France) Albano Olivetti | (Belgium) Michael Geerts (Belgium) Joran Vliegen | 4–6, 6–7^{(6–8)} |
| Loss | 11–14 | Oct 2022 | Saint-Tropez, France | Challenger | Hard | (Austria) Tristan-Samuel Weissborn | (France) Dan Added (France) Albano Olivetti | 3–6, 6–3, [10–12] |
| Win | 12–14 | Oct 2022 | Vilnius, Lithuania | Challenger | Hard (i) | (Austria) Tristan-Samuel Weissborn | (France) Dan Added (France) Théo Arribagé | 6–4, 5–7, [10–5] |
| Win | 13–14 | Jan 2023 | Ottignies-Louvain-la-Neuve, Belgium | Challenger | Hard (i) | (Austria) Tristan-Samuel Weissborn | (Czech Republic) Roman Jebavý (Czech Republic) Adam Pavlásek | 6–4, 6–3 |
| Win | 14–14 | May 2023 | Mauthausen, Austria | Challenger | Clay | (Austria) Tristan-Samuel Weissborn | (Germany) Constantin Frantzen (Germany) Hendrik Jebens | 6–4, 6–2 |
| Loss | 14–15 | Feb 2024 | Pau, France | Challenger | Hard | (Austria) Tristan-Samuel Weissborn | (United States) Christian Harrison (United States) Brandon Nakashima | 6–7^{(5–7)}, 4–6 |
| Win | 15–15 | Jun 2024 | Heilbronn, Germany | Challenger | Clay | (France) Geoffrey Blancaneaux | (Germany) Jakob Schnaitter (Germany) Mark Wallner | 7–6^{(7–5)}, 5–7, [10–3] |
| Loss | 15–16 | Aug 2024 | Porto, Portugal | Challenger | Clay | (France) Théo Arribagé | (Israel) Daniel Cukierman (Poland) Piotr Matuszewski | 4–6, 0–6 |
| Loss | 15–17 | Sep 2024 | Genoa, Italy | Challenger | Clay | (France) Théo Arribagé | (Lebanon) Benjamin Hassan (Spain) David Vega Hernández | 4–6, 5–7 |
| Win | 16–17 | Sep 2024 | Lisbon, Portugal | Challenger | Clay | (France) Théo Arribagé | (United States) George Goldhoff (Brazil) Fernando Romboli | 6–2, 6–3 |
| Loss | 16–18 | Sep 2024 | Villena, Spain | Challenger | Hard | (Spain) Íñigo Cervantes | (India) Anirudh Chandrasekar (India) Niki K. Poonacha | 6–7^{(2–7)}, 4–6 |
| Loss | 16–19 | Nov 2024 | Helsinki, Finland | Challenger | Hard (i) | (France) Théo Arribagé | (Sweden) Filip Bergevi (Netherlands) Mick Veldheer | 6–3, 6–7^{(5–7)}, [5–10] |
| Loss | 16–20 | Jan 2025 | Quimper, France | Challenger | Hard (i) | (France) Manuel Guinard | (France) Sadio Doumbia (France) Fabien Reboul | 2–6, 6–4, [3–10] |
| Win | 17–20 | Jun 2025 | Perugia, Italy | Challenger | Clay | (France) Manuel Guinard | (Netherlands) Robin Haase (United States) Vasil Kirkov | 3–6, 6–3, [10–5] |
| Win | 18–20 | Mar 2026 | Punta Cana, Dominican Republic | Challenger | Hard | (Brazil) Marcelo Demoliner | (Israel) Daniel Cukierman (United States) Trey Hilderbrand | 7–6^{(7–2)}, 3–6, [10–6] |
| Win | 19–20 | Oct 2026 | Roanne, France | Challenger | Hard (i) | (Germany) Hendrik Jebens | (United Kingdom) David Stevenson (United Kingdom) Marcus Willis | 6–4, 6–4 |

== Doubles performance timeline ==
Key
| W | F | SF | QF | #R | RR | Q# | P# | DNQ | A | Z# | PO | G | S | B | NMS | NTI | P | NH |

(W) winner; (F) finalist; (SF) semifinalist; (QF) quarterfinalist; (#R) rounds 4, 3, 2, 1; (RR) round-robin stage; (Q#) qualification round; (P#) preliminary round; (DNQ) did not qualify; (A) absent; (Z#) Davis/Fed Cup Zonal Group (with number indication) or (PO) play-off; (G) gold, (S) silver or (B) bronze Olympic/Paralympic medal; (NMS) not a Masters tournament; (NTI) not a Tier I tournament; (P) postponed; (NH) not held; (SR) strike rate (events won / competed); (W–L) win–loss record.
To avoid confusion and double counting, these charts are updated at the conclusion of a tournament or when the player's participation has ended.

Current through the 2026 Australian Open.

| Tournament | 2013 | 2014 | 2015 | 2016 | 2017 | 2018 | 2019 | 2020 | 2021 | 2022 | 2023 | 2024 | 2025 | 2026 | W–L |
|---|---|---|---|---|---|---|---|---|---|---|---|---|---|---|---|
Grand Slam tournaments
| Australian Open | A | A | A | A | A | A | A | A | 1R | 1R | A | 1R | 1R | 1R | 0–5 |
| French Open | A | A | A | A | A | A | A | A | 3R | A | 2R | 1R | 2R | | 4–4 |
| Wimbledon | A | A | A | A | A | 1R | 1R | NH | 1R | A | 2R | 2R | 1R | | 2–6 |
| US Open | A | A | A | A | A | 1R | A | A | A | A | 1R | A | 1R | | 0–3 |
| Win–loss | 0–0 | 0–0 | 0–0 | 0–0 | 0–0 | 0–2 | 0–1 | 0–0 | 2–3 | 0–1 | 2–3 | 1–3 | 1–4 | 0–1 | 6–18 |
ATP Tour Masters 1000
| Indian Wells Open | A | A | A | A | A | A | A | A | A | A | A | A | A | | 0–0 |
| Miami Open | A | A | A | A | A | A | A | A | A | A | A | A | A | | 0–0 |
| Monte-Carlo Masters | A | QF | 2R | A | SF | 2R | 1R | NH | 1R | 1R | F | 2R | W | | 16–9 |
| Madrid Open | A | A | A | A | A | A | A | A | A | A | A | A | 1R | | 0–1 |
| Italian Open | A | A | A | A | A | A | A | A | A | A | A | A | 1R | | 0–1 |
| Canadian Open | A | A | A | A | A | A | A | A | A | A | A | A | A | | 0–0 |
| Cincinnati Open | A | A | A | A | A | A | A | A | A | A | A | A | 2R | | 1–1 |
| Shanghai Masters | A | A | A | A | A | A | A | A | NH | | A | A | 1R | | 0–1 |
| Paris Masters | A | A | A | A | A | A | A | A | A | A | A | A | A | | 0–0 |
| Win–loss | 0–0 | 2–1 | 1–1 | 0–0 | 3–1 | 1–1 | 0–1 | 0–0 | 0–1 | 0–1 | 4–1 | 1–1 | 5–4 | 0–0 | 17–13 |
National representation
| Davis Cup | A | Z2 | Z2 | Z2 | Z2 | Z3 | Z3 | A | Z3 | WG2 | WG2 | WG2 | WG2 | | 16–6 |
Career statistics
| | 2013 | 2014 | 2015 | 2016 | 2017 | 2018 | 2019 | 2020 | 2021 | 2022 | 2023 | 2024 | 2025 | 2026 | Career |
| Tournaments | 0 | 1 | 1 | 0 | 2 | 12 | 10 | 2 | 14 | 8 | 17 | 15 | 20 | 3 | 105 |
| Overall win–loss | 0–0 | 2–1 | 2–2 | 1–1 | 4–3 | 9–12 | 5–9 | 2–2 | 10–14 | 4–8 | 16–18 | 10–15 | 16–19 | 0–3 | 81–107 |
| Year-end ranking | 408 | 249 | 205 | 744 | 105 | 88 | 74 | 97 | 80 | 118 | 53 | 73 | 44 | | 43% |
