= Henri Laaksonen =

Swiss-Finnish tennis player (born 1992)

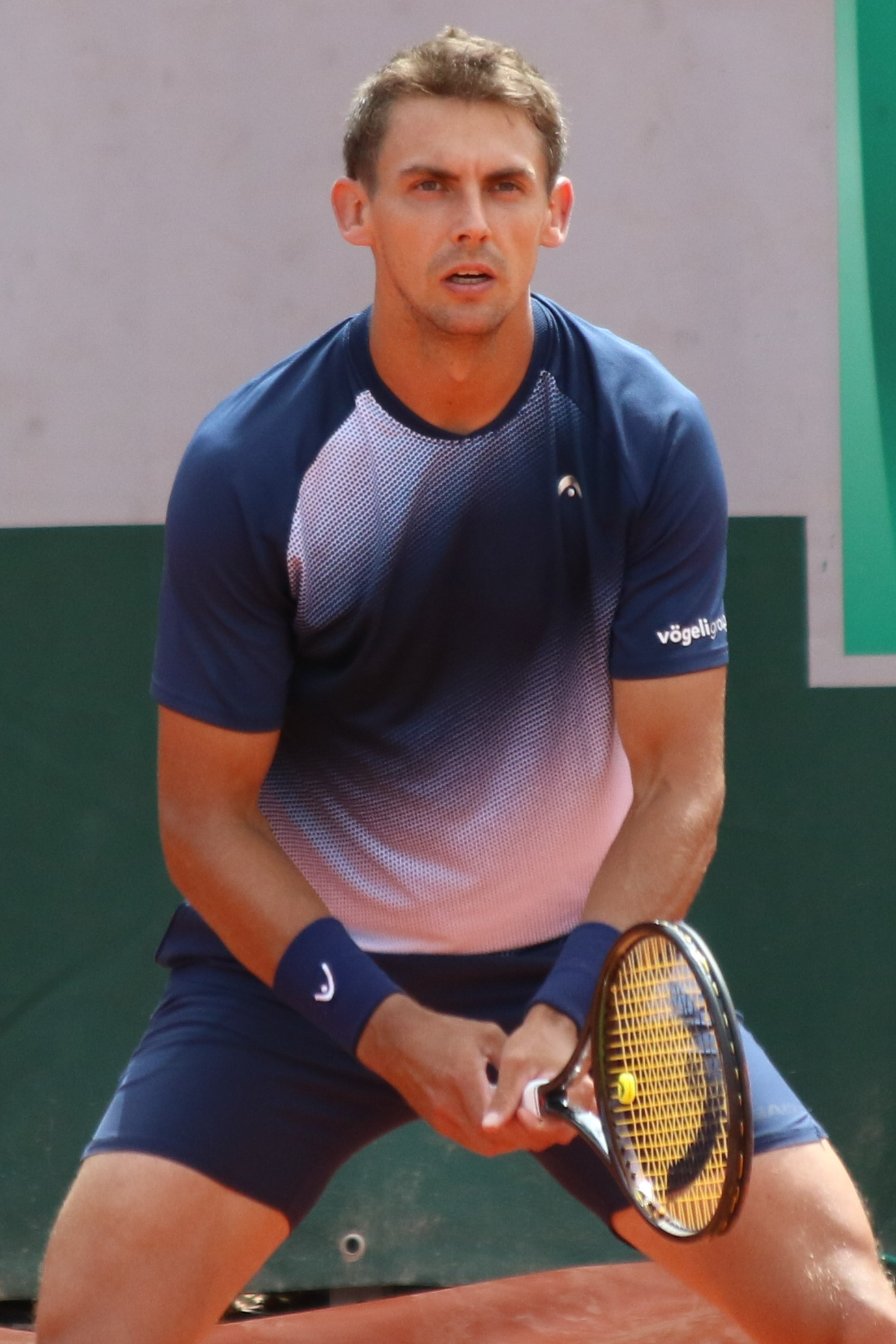
- Laaksonen at the 2022 French Open
- Country (sports): Finland (2009−2010); Switzerland (2011–2024)
- Residence: Zürich, Switzerland
- Born: 31 March 1992 (age 34) Lohja, Finland
- Height: 1.85 m (6 ft 1 in)
- Turned pro: 2009
- Retired: 2024
- Plays: Right-handed (two-handed backhand)
- Prize money: $2,379,345

Singles
- Career record: 51–75
- Career titles: 0
- Highest ranking: No. 84 (14 February 2022)

Grand Slam singles results
- Australian Open: 2R (2019)
- French Open: 3R (2021)
- Wimbledon: 1R (2017, 2022)
- US Open: 3R (2021)

Doubles
- Career record: 3–15
- Career titles: 0
- Highest ranking: No. 191 (24 December 2018)
- Last updated on: 25 November 2024.

Henri Joona Julius Laaksonen (Finnish: [ˈhenri ˈlɑːksonen],Swiss Standard German: [ˈhɛnriː ˈlaːksonɛn]; born 31 March 1992) is a Swiss former professional tennis player. His highest singles ranking is world No. 84, which he achieved on 14 February 2022, and his highest doubles ranking is world No. 191, achieved on 24 December 2018.

== Early life ==
Laaksonen's father, Sandro Della Piana, is a former Swiss tennis player. His mother is from Finland. His parents separated very early in his life, but he nonetheless kept contact with his father.

He started playing tennis at the age of 3. During his adolescent years he lived in Hyvinkää where he was coached by Pasi Virtanen. At 16, he became European champion for the Under-16s category.

In 2009, he moved to Switzerland to train at the Swiss Tennis National Tennis Center in Bienne.

Before January 2011, he represented his country of birth, Finland. Since then, he has represented Switzerland.

== Professional career ==
=== 2019-21: Two Major third rounds & two top-20 wins, back to top 100 in two years ===
Laaksonen won the biggest match of his career at the 2021 French Open against world No. 11 Roberto Bautista Agut in four sets in order to advance to a Grand Slam third round for the first time in his career.

At the 2021 US Open he reached the third round of a Major only for the second time in his career defeating world No. 19 and sixteenth seed Cristian Garín in four sets.

He won his sixth Challenger title at the 2021 Open d'Orléans defeating Dennis Novak. As a result, he returned to the top 100 at world No. 98 on 4 October 2021, five spots shy of his career-high ranking of No. 93 reached more than two years ago on 15 July 2019.

=== 2022-24: Career-high in top 85, retirement ===
He reached a career-high ranking of World No. 84 on 14 February 2022 after qualifying for the 2022 Rotterdam Open. As of 20 June 2022 he became the No. 1 Swiss player ahead of Roger Federer before being overtaken on 29 August 2022 by Marc-Andrea Huesler.

He reached the Challenger final in Hamburg, losing to compatriot Alexander Ritschard, after he retired in the second set when Ritschard was 7–5, 6–5 up and had 40–30 on his service game, climbing 9 positions back to No. 171 in the singles rankings on 24 October 2022. He reached another final at the Challenger in Roanne losing to Hugo Gaston and climbed 27 positions up to No. 155 on 14 November 2022. He finished the year ranked No. 171 on 21 November 2022.

Laaksonen retired from professional tennis in the 2024 season, in August (last match played), and started coaching Mika Brunold.

== Davis Cup career and controversy ==
He initially was called to play for Switzerland for the first round against the Czech Republic in 2013. In September 2013, Switzerland played against Ecuador in Neuchâtel for the Davis Cup World Group play-off. Laaksonen was called to play with Stanislas Wawrinka, Marco Chiudinelli, and Michael Lammer. However, Laaksonen was excluded from the team following his behavior during Thursday practice.

Wawrinka said: "There are very few promising young players [in Switzerland]. Unfortunately, among them, there are some who believe that everything is allowed and everything is granted for free. If Henri is not here today, it is because there are certain things we cannot accept. I also dislike his behaviour. Someone in his age, with his ranking and who has been supported by Swiss Tennis for many years and thinks he can not fully commit to a practice session and even complains about the coach, cannot be part of the team". Wawrinka added that he "never wants to be on a tennis court with him again". Further to this tie, Wawrinka and Laaksonen never appeared together in a team competition.

Laaksonen later was fined and received a formal warning from the Swiss Tennis Federation. The amount of the fine never was disclosed.

He was left out from the first round tie of the World Group against Serbia in February 2014, but called back for the second round tie in Geneva against Kazakhstan in April 2014. He replaced Chiudinelli, who had won the doubles in Serbia (with Lammer). However, Laaksonen did not play in any of the rubbers as the top players Roger Federer and Stan Wawrinka were in both the singles matches and the doubles. Switzerland won the tie with 3:2. For the semifinal against Italy in September 2014, Laaksonen was not part of the team. He was replaced by Chiudinelli. For the final against France, Chiudinelli and Lammer were nominated.

In 2015, after talks with the team and the captain, Laaksonen was called upon to play in the first round against Belgium in Liège. He won his two singles in five sets against Ruben Bemelmans and Steve Darcis. He took on the leader role for the young team present.

In September 2016, Switzerland played against Uzbekistan in Tashkent in the world-group playoffs. Laaksonen was again the Swiss team leader and secured the winning points. Because of its victory against Uzbekistan, Switzerland remained in the World Group.

For the 2017 Davis Cup World Group, Laaksonen played both singles and doubles in Switzerland's tie with the United States. In the World Group play-offs against Belarus, despite losing his first singles rubber, Laaksonen defeated Dzmitry Zhyrmont with Switzerland behind 2−1 in the tie. The team won the final rubber and remained in the World Group.

Laaksonen opened Switzerland's 2018 Davis Cup World Group tie against Kazakhstan, losing in four sets. He won both his singles matches in the World Group Play-off tie against Sweden, but these were the only points Switzerland registered as the team was relegated from the World Group.

Laaksonen was again the Swiss number one in the first tie of the newly formatted 2019 Davis Cup, with Switzerland playing Russia on February 1 and 2, 2019 in the qualifying round, at the Swiss Tennis Arena in Biel. Switzerland lost the tie 1–3 and then lost to Slovakia in September. Due to this performance, Switzerland was relegated to the second division.

In 2020, away against Peru in Lima, Laaksonen won his first match but lost the decisive rubber against the top Peruvian player Juan Pablo Varillas, resulting in Switzerland's relegation to Group II, the third level of world's tennis.

In 2021, Laaksonen won both singles matches as Switzerland won 5–0 against Estonia in World Group II.

== Performance timelines ==
Key
W	F	SF	QF	#R	RR	Q#	P#	DNQ	A	Z#	PO	G	S	B	NMS	NTI	P	NH

(W) winner; (F) finalist; (SF) semifinalist; (QF) quarterfinalist; (#R) rounds 4, 3, 2, 1; (RR) round-robin stage; (Q#) qualification round; (P#) preliminary round; (DNQ) did not qualify; (A) absent; (Z#) Davis/Fed Cup Zonal Group (with number indication) or (PO) play-off; (G) gold, (S) silver or (B) bronze Olympic/Paralympic medal; (NMS) not a Masters tournament; (NTI) not a Tier I tournament; (P) postponed; (NH) not held; (SR) strike rate (events won / competed); (W–L) win–loss record.
To avoid confusion and double counting, these charts are updated at the conclusion of a tournament or when the player's participation has ended.

=== Singles ===
Current through the 2023 Wimbledon qualifying.

	Finland		Switzerland														
Tournament	2009	2010	2011	2012	2013	2014	2015	2016	2017	2018	2019	2020	2021	2022	2023	SR	W–L
Grand Slam tournaments
Australian Open	A	A	A	A	A	Q1	A	Q1	Q1	Q1	2R	Q1	1R	1R	Q2	0 / 3	1–3
French Open	A	A	A	A	A	Q1	A	Q2	Q1	Q2	2R	1R	3R	2R	Q1	0 / 4	4–4
Wimbledon	A	A	A	A	Q2	Q1	A	Q1	1R	Q2	Q1	NH	Q1	1R	Q1	0 / 2	0–2
US Open	A	A	A	A	Q1	A	A	Q3	1R	Q1	2R	A	3R	Q1	A	0 / 3	3–3
Win–loss	0–0	0–0	0–0	0–0	0–0	0–0	0–0	0–0	0–2	0–0	3–3	0–1	4–3	1–3	0–0	0 / 12	8–12
National representation
Davis Cup	Z2	A	A	A	1R	A	1R	1R	1R	1R	QR	WG1	WG2	WG1	A	0 / 5	14–12
ATP Tour Masters 1000
Indian Wells Masters	A	A	A	A	A	A	A	A	2R	Q1	Q1	NH	A	1R	A	0 / 2	1–2
Miami Open	A	A	A	A	A	A	A	A	Q1	Q1	Q1	NH	Q1	2R	A	0 / 1	0–1
Monte-Carlo Masters	A	A	A	A	A	A	A	A	A	A	A	NH	Q2	Q1	A	0 / 0	0–0
Cincinnati Masters	A	A	A	A	A	A	A	A	A	A	A	A	A	1R	A	0 / 1	0–1
Shanghai Masters	A	A	A	A	A	A	A	A	Q2	A	A	NH				0 / 0	0–0
Paris Masters	A	A	A	A	A	A	A	A	A	A	A	A	Q1	A		0 / 0	0–0
Win–loss	0–0	0–0	0–0	0–0	0–0	0–0	0–0	0–0	1–1	0–0	0–0	0–0	0–0	0–3	0–0	0 / 4	1–4
Career statistics
Tournaments	0	0	0	2	4	3	2	4	10	4	8	5	8	14	0	64	
Overall win–loss	1–0	0–0	0–0	0–2	3–5	1–3	3–2	3–6	11–12	7–5	6–12	2–6	9–7	5–15	0–0	51–75	
Year-end ranking	1386	1202	588	291	244	318	181	136	121	169	104	134	98	172	567	43%	

== ATP Challenger and ITF Futures finals ==
=== Singles: 18 (8–10) ===
Legend ATP Challenger (6–4) ITF Futures (2–6)	Finals by surface Hard (6–6) Clay (1–3) Grass (0–0) Carpet (1–1)

Result	W–L	Date	Tournament	Tier	Surface	Opponent	Score
Loss	0–1	Jan 2011	Israel F1, Eilat	Futures	Hard	(Russia) Valery Rudnev	3–6, 1–6
Loss	0–2	Oct 2011	Kuwait F2, Mishref	Futures	Hard	(Belgium) Julien Dubail	3–6, 6–4, 4–6
Loss	0–3	Mar 2012	Switzerland F1, Taverne	Futures	Carpet (i)	(Germany) Moritz Baumann	4–6, 6–4, 4–6
Loss	0–4	Sep 2012	Portugal F4, Espinho	Futures	Clay	(Czech Republic) Jiří Veselý	2–6, 4–6
Loss	0–5	Sep 2012	Portugal F5, Porto	Futures	Clay	(Spain) Marc Giner	6–7^{(6–8)}, 2–6
Win	1–5	Mar 2014	Switzerland F1, Taverne	Futures	Carpet (i)	(Germany) Tim Pütz	4–6, 6–4, 7–6^{(8–6)}
Win	2–5	Nov 2015	Champaign, United States	Challenger	Hard (i)	(United States) Taylor Fritz	4–6, 6–2, 6–2
Win	3–5	Nov 2015	USA F34, Waco	Futures	Hard (i)	(United States) Sekou Bangoura	6–3, 4–6, 6–1
Loss	3–6	Mar 2016	USA F11, Calabasas	Futures	Hard	(Australia) Matthew Barton	6–7^{(6–8)}, 3–6
Win	4–6	Sep 2016	Shanghai, China, P.R.	Challenger	Hard	(Chinese Taipei) Jason Jung	6–3, 6–3
Win	5–6	Nov 2016	Champaign, United States (2)	Challenger	Hard (i)	(Belgium) Ruben Bemelmans	7–5, 6–3
Loss	5–7	Aug 2018	Chengdu, China, P.R.	Challenger	Hard	(China) Zhang Ze	6–2, 2–5 ret.
Win	6–7	Feb 2019	Bangkok, Thailand	Challenger	Hard	(Israel) Dudi Sela	6–2, 6–4
Win	7–7	May 2019	Rome, Italy	Challenger	Clay	(Italy) Gian Marco Moroni	6–7^{(2–7)}, 7–6^{(7–2)}, 6–2
Loss	7–8	Jul 2021	Braunschweig, Germany	Challenger	Clay	(Germany) Daniel Altmaier	1–6, 2–6
Win	8–8	Sep 2021	Orléans, France	Challenger	Hard (i)	(Austria) Dennis Novak	6–1, 2–6, 6–2
Loss	8–9	Oct 2022	Hamburg, Germany	Challenger	Hard (i)	(Switzerland) Alexander Ritschard	5–7, 5–6 ret.
Loss	8–10	Nov 2022	Roanne, France	Challenger	Hard (i)	(France) Hugo Gaston	7–6^{(8–6)}, 5–7, 1–6

=== Doubles: 12 (4–8) ===
Legend ATP Challenger (2–3) ITF Futures (2–5)	Finals by surface Hard (1–3) Clay (1–3) Grass (0–0) Carpet (2–2)

Result	W–L	Date	Tournament	Tier	Surface	Partner	Opponents	Score
Win	1–0	Mar 2009	Switzerland F2, Greifensee	Futures	Carpet (i)	(Austria) Philipp Oswald	(Jamaica) Dustin Brown (Switzerland) Alexander Sadecky	6–1, 6–4
Loss	1–1	Aug 2009	Geneva, Switzerland	Challenger	Clay	(Austria) Philipp Oswald	(Argentina) Diego Álvarez (Argentina) Juan-Martín Aranguren	4–6, 6–4, [2–10]
Loss	1–2	Oct 2011	Kuwait F2, Meshref	Futures	Hard	(Switzerland) Luca Margaroli	(Germany) Florian Fallert (Germany) Nils Langer	4–6, 6–7^{(6–8)}
Loss	1–3	Sep 2012	Portugal F4, Espinho	Futures	Clay	(Switzerland) Fede Valsangiacomo	(Netherlands) Stephan Fransen (Netherlands) Wesley Koolhof	5–7, 2–6
Loss	1–4	Mar 2014	Switzerland F1, Taverne	Futures	Carpet (i)	(Lithuania) Laurynas Grigelis	(Sweden) Jesper Brunström (Denmark) Frederik Nielsen	4–6, 6–7^{(4–7)}
Win	2–4	Mar 2014	Switzerland F2, Trimbach	Futures	Carpet (i)	(Switzerland) Luca Margaroli	(Russia) Denis Matsukevich (Italy) Matteo Volante	6–2, 6–2
Loss	2–5	Jan 2015	Germany F1, Schwieberdingen	Futures	Carpet (i)	(Romania) Victor Vlad Cornea	(Germany) Fabian Fallert (Germany) Florian Fallert	4–6, 3–6
Loss	2–6	Mar 2016	USA F11, Calabasas	Futures	Hard	(Czech Republic) Marek Michalička	(United States) Nicolas Meister (United States) Eric Quigley	6–4, 2–6, [3–10]
Loss	2–7	Jul 2018	Marburg, Germany	Challenger	Clay	(Switzerland) Luca Margaroli	(Brazil) Fabrício Neis (Spain) David Vega Hernández	6–4, 4–6, [8–10]
Win	3–7	Jul 2018	Båstad, Sweden	Challenger	Clay	(Finland) Harri Heliövaara	(Czech Republic) Zdeněk Kolář (Portugal) Gonçalo Oliveira	6–4, 6–3
Loss	3–8	Oct 2018	Fairfield, United States	Challenger	Hard	(Finland) Harri Heliövaara	(Thailand) Sanchai Ratiwatana (Indonesia) Christopher Rungkat	0–6, 6–7^{(9–11)}
Win	4–8	Nov 2018	Charlottesville, United States	Challenger	Hard (i)	(Finland) Harri Heliövaara	(Japan) Toshihide Matsui (Denmark) Frederik Nielsen	6–3, 6–4

== Record against top 10 players ==
Laaksonen's match record against players who have been ranked world No. 10 or higher is as follows, with those who have been No. 1 in boldface. Only ATP Tour main draw and Davis Cup matches are considered.

- (Italy) Matteo Berrettini 1–0
- (Spain) Roberto Bautista Agut 1–1
- (Canada) Félix Auger-Aliassime 0–1
- (Czechoslovakia) Tomáš Berdych 0–1
- (Serbia) **Novak Djokovic** 0–1
- (Spain) David Ferrer 0–1
- (United States) Taylor Fritz 0–1
- (Belgium) David Goffin 0–1
- (Russia) Karen Khachanov 0–1
- (Argentina) Juan Mónaco 0–1
- (Japan) Kei Nishikori 0–1
- (Russia) Andrey Rublev 0–1
- (Denmark) Holger Rune 0–1
- (Norway) Casper Ruud 0–1
- (Canada) Denis Shapovalov 0–1
- (United States) Jack Sock 0–1
- (Austria) Dominic Thiem 0–1
- (Spain) Fernando Verdasco 0–1
- (Argentina) Juan Martín del Potro 0–2
- (France) Richard Gasquet 0–2
- (United States) John Isner 0–2
- (Russia) **Daniil Medvedev** 0–2

* As of 5 September 2023.
