= Hugo Gaston =

French tennis player (born 2000)

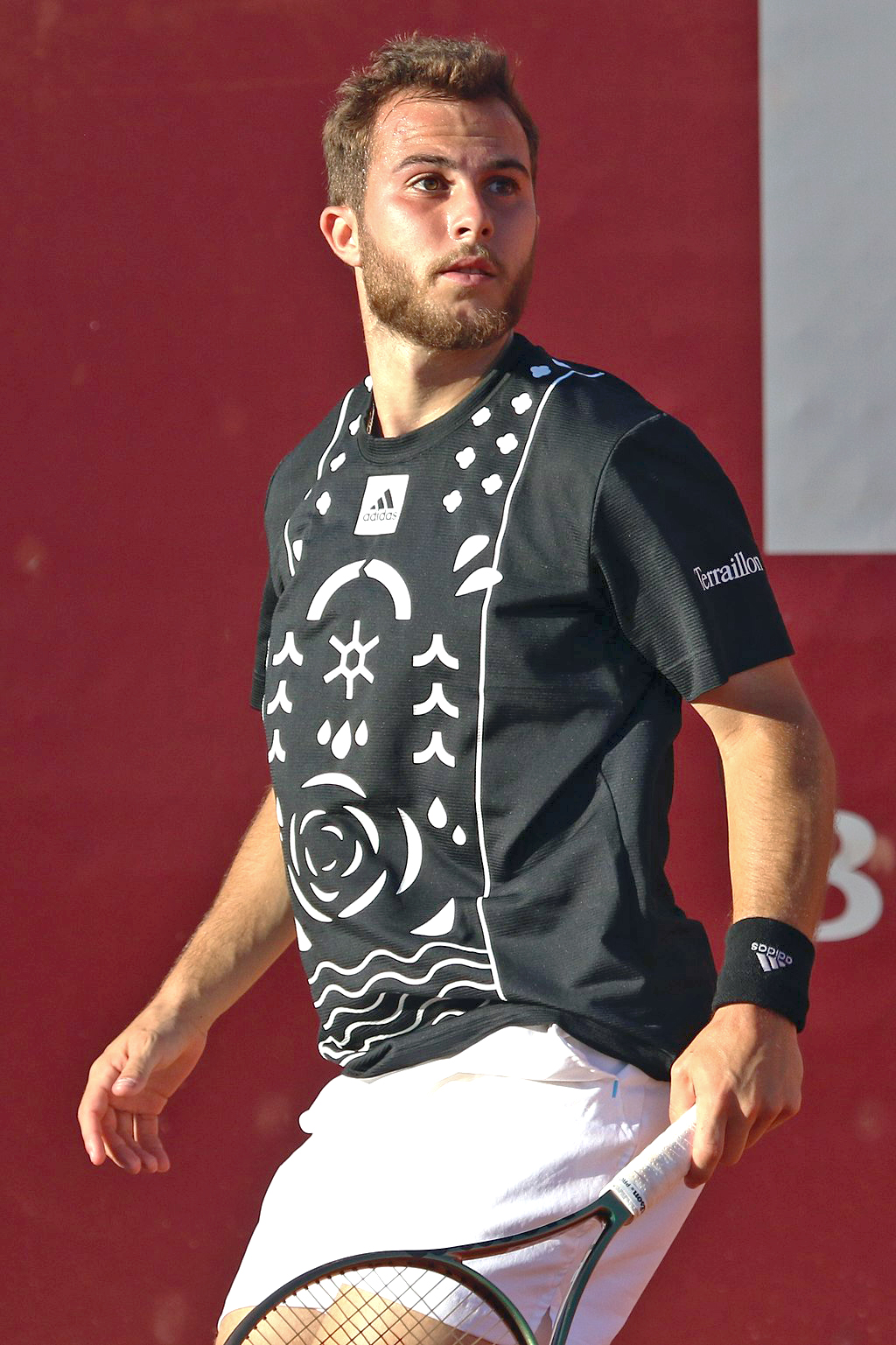
- Gaston at the 2022 BNP Paribas Primrose Bordeaux
- Country (sports): France
- Residence: Fonsorbes, France
- Born: 26 September 2000 (age 26) Toulouse, France
- Height: 1.73 m (5 ft 8 in)
- Turned pro: 2018
- Plays: Left-handed (two-handed backhand)
- Coach: Marc Barbier, Younes El Aynaoui
- Prize money: US $4,416,012

Singles
- Career record: 49–79 (at ATP Tour level, Grand Slam level, and in Davis Cup)
- Career titles: 0
- Highest ranking: No. 58 (11 July 2022)
- Current ranking: No. 110 (26 October 2026)

Grand Slam singles results
- Australian Open: 2R (2024, 2025)
- French Open: 4R (2020)
- Wimbledon: 2R (2022)
- US Open: 2R (2023)

Doubles
- Career record: 7-17 (at ATP Tour level, Grand Slam level, and in Davis Cup)
- Career titles: 0
- Highest ranking: No. 220 (16 May 2022)
- Current ranking: No. 365 (22 June 2026)

Grand Slam doubles results
- Australian Open: 2R (2022)
- French Open: 3R (2026)
- Wimbledon: 1R (2022)
- US Open: 1R (2022, 2024)

Grand Slam mixed doubles results
- French Open: 2R (2022, 2024)
Medal record
Representing France
Youth Olympic Games
| Gold medal – first place | 2018 Buenos Aires | Singles |
| Bronze medal – third place | 2018 Buenos Aires | Doubles |
- Last updated on: 31 October 2026.

Hugo Gaston (French pronunciation: [yɡo ɡastɔ̃]; born 26 September 2000) is a French professional tennis player. His career high ATP ranking in singles is world No. 58, which he achieved on 11 July 2022, and in doubles is world No. 220, which he achieved on 16 May 2022. He won the 2018 Australian Open – Boys' doubles title with compatriot Clément Tabur.

== Junior career ==
In December 2017, Gaston won the Orange Bowl International Tennis Championship.

In 2018, Gaston won the Boys' Doubles at the Australian Open with fellow countryman Clément Tabur. The same year, he was named flag bearer for France at the Youth Summer Olympics in Buenos Aires. There, Gaston captured his first singles major title as well as two bronze medals, with Clément Tabur in the boys' doubles and with Clara Burel in the mixed doubles. He achieved a junior career-high ranking of No.2 the next week. Gaston also qualified for the ITF Junior Masters, where he reached the semifinals, losing to Tseng Chun-hsin.

== Professional career ==
=== 2018–19: ATP debut, Steady progress on the Challenger Tour ===
In February, Gaston received a wildcard into the main draw of the 2018 Open 13 but lost in the first round to world no. 129 Stefano Travaglia 2–6, 2–6.

Gaston received a wildcard into the 2018 French Open qualifying but lost in the first round to 24th Seed Jürgen Zopp 7–5, 4–6, 2–6.

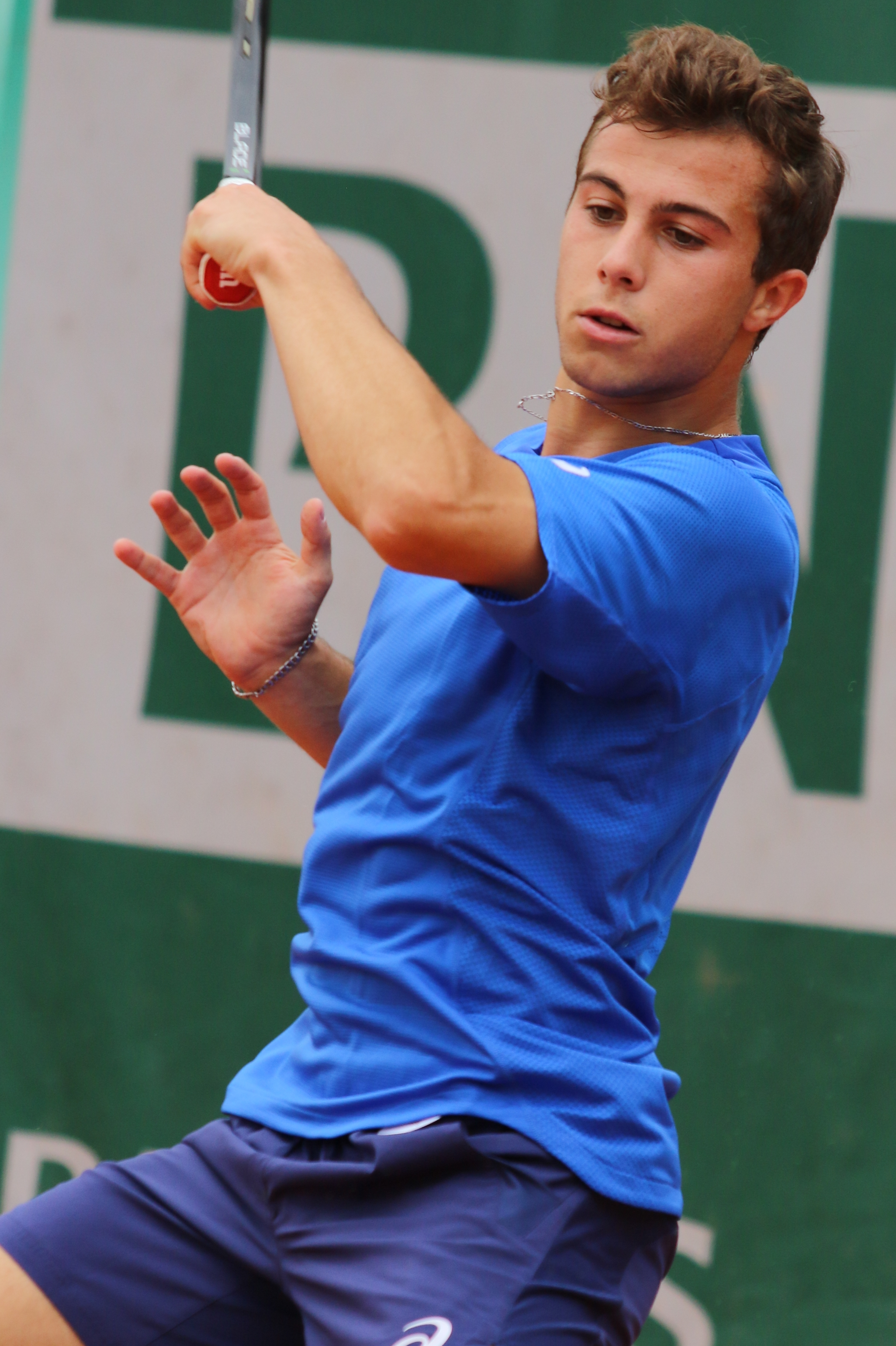
Gaston at the 2019 French Open

Gaston started 2019 with no ranking points to his name and $44,264 in prize money. He played in his first Challenger of the year in Rennes, but lost in the first round to world no. 164 Alexander Bublik 5–7, 6–3, 3–6. His next challenger was in Quimper where he lost in the first round to world no. 185 Daniel Brands 2–6, 6–7^{(7–3)}.

In April, Gaston won his first Futures tournament in Pula, Italy, defeating David Pichler in the final 6–4, 2–6, 6–3. This win brought him to a new career high of number 661 in the world. He continued his good form into May by winning his first Challenger match in Aix-en-Provence against world no. 553 Dan Added 6–1, 7–6^{(7–3)}. He lost in the next round to world no. 148 Antoine Hoang 2–6, 1–6.

In May, he was again given a wildcard into French Open qualifying draw. In the first round he met the 25th seed and world no. 139, Marco Trungelliti. He beat Trungelliti 6–4, 6–1 to mark his first win against a top 200 player. He lost to world no. 212 Alexey Vatutin in the next round 1–6, 3–6.

His next tournament was in Lyon and buoyed by his French Open results, he reached the third round, beating Bernabé Zapata Miralles 6–1, 6–3 and world no.199 Tallon Griekspoor 2–6, 6–4 ret. His run was ended by the top seed and former world no.17 Albert Ramos Viñolas 2–6, 1–6.

Over the next four months, Gaston reached four ITF Futures finals, winning one in Houston. He also competed in Cassis but lost in the first round to world no. 291 Marc-Andrea Hüsler 6–4, 6–7^{(5–7)}, 3–6. These combined results brought inside the world's top 400 at number 379 in the world.

His next tournament was in Tiburon where he equalled his best challenger result by reaching the third round, beating Evan Song and Daniel Galán before losing to eventual champion and world no. 87 Tommy Paul 6–7^{(8–10)}, 1–6. He continued his good run of form, winning Futures in Norman and Rodez defeating Michael Geerts and Benjamin Bonzi in the finals respectively.

He played his last challenger of the year in Brest where he beat Constant Lestienne 7–6^{(7–3)}, 6–2 before losing to world no.106 Lloyd Harris 6–7^{(3–7)}, 5–7. Due to his impressive form and promise, he was given a wildcard into the 2019 Paris Masters qualifying draw. In the first round, he played the 5th seed and world no.51 Juan Ignacio Londero. He upset the Argentine, defeating him 7–6^{(7–2)}, 6–4 for his first top 100 win. In the qualifying competition, he lost to world no.63 Casper Ruud in three tight sets.

He ended the year ranked No. 252 in the world with 185 ranking points, a huge improvement compared to his ranking at the end of 2018. He earned $54,214 in prize money in 2019, bringing his career earnings to $98,478.

=== 2020: Major debut, French Open fourth round & first top 20 win ===
Gaston began his 2020 season at Nouméa where he defeated world no. 211 Yan Bai 6–4, 7–6^{(8–6)} before losing to the 5th seed and world no. 111 Thomas Fabbiano 2–6, 2–6. He next played in Bendigo where he was the no. 9 seed. He lost his first match to Alexander Crnokrak 4–6 6–7^{(2–7)}.

At the end of January, Hugo received a wildcard into the main draw of the 2020 Australian Open in his first Grand Slam tournament. He played the world no. 90 and clay-court specialist Jaume Munar in the first round, but lost in 4 sets, 5–7, 7–5, 0–6, 3–6.

He next played in the Montpellier qualifying draw but lost to the French veteran and world No. 192 Nicolas Mahut. He next competed in Cherbourg but lost in the first round to former world no. 45 Maximilian Marterer 7–6^{(7–5)}, 4–6, 4–6.

The following week, Hugo played in Bergamo as the 15th seed. In the second round, he played fellow Frenchman and world No. 246 Hugo Grenier, beating him. In the third round, he played the top seed Lorenzo Giustino and beat him to reach his first Challenger quarterfinal. There he faced Cem İlkel and defeated him to reach the semifinals of a Challenger for the first time. In the semifinals, Gaston faced former world No. 49 Illya Marchenko. In a tight match full of breaks of serve, Gaston came up short against Marchenko, losing 6–4, 4–6, 4–6. Gaston hit 34 dropshots throughout the match, including 14 in the third set. After the tournament, Gaston's ranking climbed to number 228 in the world.

The week after he played in Pau. In the first round he played world no. 262 Aslan Karatsev and beat him 6–3, 1–6, 6–1. In the next round he played world no. 139 and 5th seed Yannick Maden and beat him 1–6, 6–4, 6–4 to make the third round. There, he played 18-year old and world no. 514 Harold Mayot, a fellow up and coming French prodigy. After losing the first set 1–6, he retired due to injury to end his run. This was the last tournament he played before the coronavirus pandemic halted professional men's tennis until August.

After the tennis season resumed in August, Gaston went on a poor run of form, losing before or in the first round in his next four Challenger tournaments, losing to Facundo Bagnis, Maximilian Marterer, Andrea Pelligrino and Roberto Cid Subervi respectively.

In September, he received another wildcard into the main draw of the 2020 French Open and was given an opportunity to turn his form around. Gaston made a breakthrough at the French Open, defeating countryman Maxime Janvier, Yoshihito Nishioka, and 2015 French Open champion and sixteenth-seeded Stan Wawrinka in five sets to advance to the fourth round of the tournament, where he exited in five sets to World No. 3 Dominic Thiem. He attempted 58 drop shots in his match against Thiem, winning 40 of those points 5.6 million French tuned in to watch his match against Thiem, the highest number for any match at the tournament.

Two weeks after the French Open, Gaston competed in Hamburg where he was forced to play in the qualifying draw. In the first round he played world no. 249 Hugo Grenier. He beat his compatriot in three sets after squandering a 5–1 lead in the second set, 7–6^{(7–0)}, 6–7^{(7–1)}, 6–4. In the next round he faced world no. 280 Matthias Bachinger but lost 6–4, 4–6, 4–6. He still made it into the main draw as a lucky loser and played 5th seed and world no. 130 Sumit Nagal in the first round, beating him 7–5, 4–1 ret. In the next round he lost to world no. 171 Sebastian Ofner 6–7^{(5–7)}, 2–6.

He received a wildcard from the French Tennis Federation into the first round at the 2020 Rolex Paris Masters. He lost to world no. 15 Pablo Carreño Busta in the first round 3–6, 2–6.

=== 2021: First ATP final & Masters quarterfinal & Top 100 ===
In March, Gaston won his first match at the ATP masters 1000 level as a wildcard at the 2021 Miami Open defeating Dominik Koepfer. He entered the top 150 on 10 May 2021 for the first time in his career.

In June at the 2021 French Open, Gaston reached the second round in doubles, on the 4th consecutive attempt being awarded a wildcard each time, partnering with fellow Frenchman Arthur Cazaux.

In July at the Swiss Open, Gaston beat Juan Manuel Cerúndolo, fifth seed Federico Delbonis, fourth seed Cristian Garín in the quarterfinals, and seventh seed Laslo Đere in the semifinals to reach his first ATP semifinal and final, where he lost to third seed Casper Ruud.

At the 2021 Rolex Paris Masters, Gaston entered as a qualifier and reached the quarterfinal of a Masters 1000 for the first time in his career, defeating fellow Frenchman wildcard Arthur Rinderknech, twelfth seed Pablo Carreño Busta, and Carlos Alcaraz. Ranked No. 103 he became the lowest-ranked Paris quarterfinalist since Frenchman world No. 121 Michaël Llodra in 2012. As a result, he entered the top 100 in the rankings for the first time in his career, moving 36 positions up the rankings. He also qualified for the 2021 Next Generation ATP Finals the next day on 5 November.

=== 2022: Wimbledon & US Open & Top 60 debuts ===
Ranked No. 74 at the 2022 French Open, he defeated World No. 20 and 19th seed Alex de Minaur in a five sets match, with a super tiebreak in the fifth set, lasting almost 4 hours for his second Grand Slam and French Open top-20 win. In the second round he moved past lucky loser and debutant Pedro Cachin to reach the third round for a second time at this Major in his career. As a result, a month later, he reached the top 60 at world No. 58 on 11 July 2022.

He received a wildcard for the qualifying competition in his home tournament, the 2022 Rolex Paris Masters, but lost in the first round to Marc-Andrea Huesler. As a result of not being able to defend his points from his quarterfinal run in Paris in 2021, he dropped by close to 50 positions in the rankings, out of the top 100 to No. 132 on 7 November 2022. He won the Challenger in Roanne defeating Henri Laaksonen and climbed 26 positions up to No. 106 on 14 November 2022.

=== 2023: Loss of form and Unsportsmanlike conduct ===
He received a wildcard for the main draw at the 2023 French Open where he lost in the first round to Alex Molcan.

In May, Gaston received a fine for intentionally dropping a ball during his match with Borna Ćorić in the second round of the 2023 Madrid Open, with the aim of forcing the replay of a point. The 144,000 euro fine was higher than his 2023 prize money earnings to that point, but on appeal it was conditionally reduced to 72,000 euros subject to no further similar incidents happening within a year. The ATP stated that they would increase fines by 100% with each consecutive violation in the same season.

In July, Gaston won his second title on the Challenger tour at the Iasi Open in Romania, defeating Bernabe Zapata Miralles in the final. Later in the same month, Gaston won his third title in Trieste, defeating Francesco Passaro in the final.

In August, Gaston entered the main draw of the US Open as a qualifier, defeating fellow qualifier Sho Shimabukuro in the first round to reach the second round for the first time at this Major.

=== 2024: ATP final, Challenger title ===
In January, Gaston entered the 2024 Australian Open as a lucky loser and lost in the second round to 12th seed Taylor Fritz.

In June, Gaston won his first Challenger title of the season in Lyon as the top seed, defeating fellow countryman Alexandre Muller in the final.

At the 2024 Generali Open Kitzbühel he reached the quarterfinals defeating Daniel Altmaier and seventh seed Roberto Carballés Baena. He reached his second career ATP semifinal defeating top seed and defending champion Sebastián Báez in the longest three-set match of his career, lasting three hours and eight minutes. He reached his second final after defeating another Argentine Facundo Díaz Acosta, following his retirement. As a result he returned to the top 65 moving 30 positions up in the singles rankings on 29 July 2024 and in the top 60 a week later.

=== 2025: Fifth Challenger title, back to top 100 ===
In September, Gaston won his first Challenger title in more than a year at the Open de Rennes, defeating Stan Wawrinka in the final. In October, he reached a new Challenger final at the Open de Roanne, losing to Otto Virtanen. As a result, Gaston returned into the top 100 on 13 October 2025. Later in the month, Gaston won his second Challenger title of the season at the Brest Challenger, defeating Eliot Spizzirri in the final.

=== 2026: ATP semifinal, loss of form ===
In July, Gaston reached his fourth career semifinal on the ATP Tour at the Estoril Open but lost to fellow countryman Luca Van Assche.

In his second part of the season he showed loss of form after retiring in his round of 16 match against compatriot and eventual champion Moïse Kouamé at the 2026 Brest Challenger, where he was defending his title as the top seed. He received a wildcard for the qualifying competition at the 2026 Rolex Paris Masters but lost to Vit Kopriva.

== Playing style ==
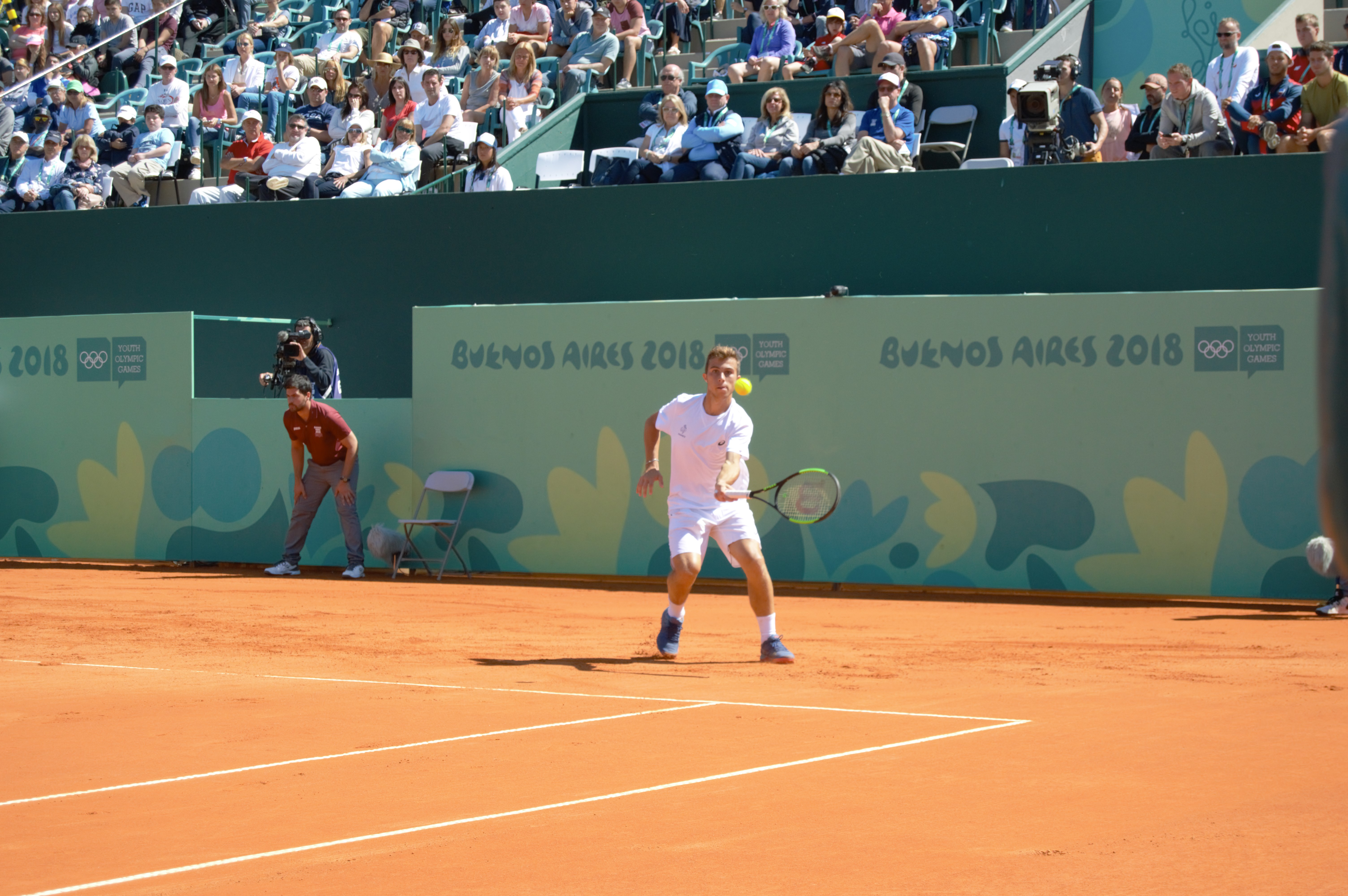
Gaston playing a drop shot at the 2018 Summer Youth Olympics

Gaston is known for his unique and unorthodox style of play. He is left-handed and utilizes the wide serve on the advantage court like many left-handed players. Gaston weaponizes dropshots often in his matches. He is known to hit dropshots after bringing his opponent out wide with his serve, to make them cover more of the court. After his fourth round loss to Dominic Thiem, Gaston said "I love to do some dropshots. But I can do all the shots in my game, so it's important to change". Thiem said of him "I haven't seen in a very long time a player with such a big touch in his hands, his dropshots are just from another planet". Gaston has a varied playing style and hits sliced forehands as well as backhands to destabilize his opponents. His favourite surface is clay and his backhand is his favourite groundstroke.

== Performance timeline ==
Key
| W | F | SF | QF | #R | RR | Q# | P# | DNQ | A | Z# | PO | G | S | B | NMS | NTI | P | NH |

(W) winner; (F) finalist; (SF) semifinalist; (QF) quarterfinalist; (#R) rounds 4, 3, 2, 1; (RR) round-robin stage; (Q#) qualification round; (P#) preliminary round; (DNQ) did not qualify; (A) absent; (Z#) Davis/Fed Cup Zonal Group (with number indication) or (PO) play-off; (G) gold, (S) silver or (B) bronze Olympic/Paralympic medal; (NMS) not a Masters tournament; (NTI) not a Tier I tournament; (P) postponed; (NH) not held; (SR) strike rate (events won / competed); (W–L) win–loss record.
To avoid confusion and double counting, these charts are updated at the conclusion of a tournament or when the player's participation has ended.

=== Singles ===
Current through the 2026 Rolex Paris Masters.

| Tournament | 2018 | 2019 | 2020 | 2021 | 2022 | 2023 | 2024 | 2025 | 2026 | SR | W–L | Win % |
|---|---|---|---|---|---|---|---|---|---|---|---|---|
Grand Slam tournaments
| Australian Open | A | A | 1R | Q1 | 1R | Q2 | 2R | 2R | 1R | 0 / 4 | 2–5 | 33% |
| French Open | Q1 | Q2 | 4R | 1R | 3R | 1R | 1R | 2R | 2R | 0 / 7 | 7–6 | 54% |
| Wimbledon | A | A | NH | Q1 | 2R | Q2 | 1R | 1R | 1R | 0 / 4 | 1–4 | 20% |
| US Open | A | A | A | Q2 | 1R | 2R | 1R | 1R | 1R | 0 / 4 | 1–5 | 20% |
| Win–loss | 0–0 | 0–0 | 3–2 | 0–1 | 3–4 | 1–2 | 1–4 | 2–3 | 1-4 | 0 / 19 | 11–20 | 37% |
ATP Masters 1000
| Indian Wells Masters | A | A | NH | A | 1R | A | Q1 | 2R | A | 0 / 2 | 1–2 | 33% |
| Miami Open | A | A | NH | 2R | 3R | A | Q1 | 2R | A | 0 / 3 | 4–3 | 57% |
| Monte-Carlo Masters | A | A | NH | A | Q1 | Q1 | Q1 | Q1 | A | 0 / 0 | 0–0 | – |
| Madrid Open | A | A | NH | A | Q1 | 2R | Q1 | 2R | Q1 | 0 / 2 | 1–2 | 33% |
| Italian Open | A | A | A | A | A | A | Q1 | 1R | Q1 | 0 / 1 | 0–1 | 0% |
| Canadian Open | A | A | NH | A | 1R | A | A | 2R | Q1 | 0 / 2 | 1–2 | 33% |
| Cincinnati Masters | A | A | A | A | Q1 | Q1 | Q1 | 1R | Q1 | 0 / 1 | 0–1 | 0% |
| Shanghai Masters | A | A | NH | | | A | 1R | A | Q1 | 0 / 1 | 0–1 | 0% |
| Paris Masters | A | Q2 | 1R | QF | Q1 | A | Q1 | A | Q1 | 0 / 2 | 3–2 | 60% |
| Win–loss | 0–0 | 0–0 | 0–1 | 4–2 | 2–3 | 1–1 | 0–1 | 3–6 | 0–0 | 0 / 14 | 10–14 | 42% |
Career statistics
| Tournaments | 1 | 0 | 3 | 9 | 18 | 9 | 16 | 5 | | Career total: 61 | | |
| Overall win–loss | 0–1 | 0–0 | 3–3 | 9–9 | 10–18 | 5–9 | 13–16 | 2–5 | 0–0 | 0 / 61 | 42–61 | 41% |
| Win % | 0% | – | 50% | 50% | 36% | 36% | 45% | 29% | – | Career total: 40.78% | | |
| Year-end ranking | – | 252 | 162 | 66 | 111 | 104 | 76 | 96 | | $4,416,012 | | |

=== Doubles ===
| Tournament | 2018 | 2019 | 2020 | 2021 | 2022 | 2023 | 2024 | SR | W–L | Win % |
|---|---|---|---|---|---|---|---|---|---|---|
Grand Slam tournaments
| Australian Open | A | A | A | A | 2R | A | A | 0 / 1 | 1–1 | 50% |
| French Open | 1R | 1R | 1R | 2R | 1R | A | A | 0 / 5 | 1–5 | 17% |
| Wimbledon | A | A | NH | A | 1R | A | A | 0 / 1 | 0–1 | 0% |
| US Open | A | A | A | A | 1R | A | 1R | 0 / 2 | 0–2 | 0% |
| Win–loss | 0–1 | 0–1 | 0–1 | 1–1 | 1–4 | 0–0 | 0–1 | 0 / 9 | 2–9 | 18% |
Career statistics
| Tournaments | 2 | 1 | 3 | 1 | 5 | 0 | 3 | Career: 15 | | |
| Overall win–loss | 0–2 | 0–1 | 0–3 | 1–1 | 3–5 | 0–0 | 0–3 | Career: 4–15 | | |
| Win % | 0% | 0% | 0% | 50% | 38% | – | 0% | Career: 21% | | |
| Year-end ranking | – | 835 | 337 | 347 | 298 | 826 | | | | |

== ATP Tour finals ==
=== Singles: 2 (2 runner-ups) ===
| Legend Grand Slam (0–0) ATP Finals (0–0) ATP Masters 1000 (0–0) ATP 500 (0–0) ATP 250 (0–2) | Finals by surface Hard (0–0) Clay (0–2) Grass (0–0) | Finals by setting Outdoor (0–2) Indoor (0–0) |

| Result | W–L | Date | Tournament | Tier | Surface | Opponent | Score |
|---|---|---|---|---|---|---|---|
| Loss | 0–1 | Jul 2021 | Swiss Open Gstaad, Switzerland | ATP 250 | Clay | (Norway) Casper Ruud | 3–6, 2–6 |
| Loss | 0–2 | Jul 2024 | Austrian Open Kitzbühel, Austria | ATP 250 | Clay | (Italy) Matteo Berrettini | 5–7, 3–6 |

== Junior Grand Slam finals ==
=== Doubles: 1 (1 title) ===
| Result | Year | Tournament | Surface | Partner | Opponent | Score |
|---|---|---|---|---|---|---|
| Win | 2018 | Australian Open | Hard | (France) Clément Tabur | (Germany) Rudolf Molleker (Germany) Henri Squire | 6–2, 6–2 |

== ATP Challenger and ITF Tour finals ==
=== Singles: 21 (10 titles, 11 runner-ups) ===
| Legend ATP Challenger Tour (6–7) ITF WTT (4–4) | Finals by surface Hard (6–2) Clay (4–9) |

| Result | W–L | Date | Tournament | Tier | Surface | Opponent | Score |
|---|---|---|---|---|---|---|---|
| Loss | 0–1 | Apr 2019 | M25 Santa Margherita di Pula, Italy | WTT | Clay | (Sweden) Christian Lindell | 2–6, 0–6 |
| Win | 1–1 | Apr 2019 | M25 Santa Margherita di Pula, Italy | WTT | Clay | (Austria) David Pichler | 6–4, 2–6, 6–3 |
| Loss | 1–2 | Jun 2019 | M25+H, Toulouse, France | WTT | Clay | (France) Benjamin Bonzi | 4–6, 4–6 |
| Loss | 1–3 | Jun 2019 | M25 Montauban, France | WTT | Clay | (Brazil) Thiago Seyboth Wild | 4–6, 2–6 |
| Loss | 1–4 | Aug 2019 | M15 Piombino, Italy | WTT | Hard | (France) Matteo Martineau | 6–2, 6–7^{(6–8)}, 6–7^{(3–7)} |
| Win | 2–4 | Sep 2019 | M25 Houston, USA | WTT | Hard | (Italy) Liam Caruana | 6–1, 6–3 |
| Win | 3–4 | Sep 2019 | M25 Norman, USA | WTT | Hard | (Belgium) Michael Geerts | 6–4, 7–5 |
| Win | 4–4 | Oct 2019 | M25+H Rodez, France | WTT | Hard | (France) Benjamin Bonzi | 7–6^{(7–4)}, 6–3 |
| Loss | 4–5 | Apr 2021 | Rome, Italy | Challenger | Clay | (Italy) Andrea Pellegrino | 6–3, 2–6, 1–6 |
| Loss | 4–6 | Jul 2021 | Iași, Romania | Challenger | Clay | (Czech Republic) Zdeněk Kolář | 5–7, 6–4, 4–6 |
| Loss | 4–7 | Sep 2021 | Tulln an der Donau, Austria | Challenger | Clay | (Germany) Mats Moraing | 2–6, 1–6 |
| Loss | 4–8 | Oct 2021 | Barcelona, Spain | Challenger | Clay | (Bulgaria) Dimitar Kuzmanov | 3–6, 0–6 |
| Win | 5–8 | Nov 2022 | Roanne, France | Challenger | Hard (i) | (Switzerland) Henri Laaksonen | 6–7^{(6–8)}, 7–5, 6–1 |
| Loss | 5–9 | Mar 2023 | Viña del Mar, Chile | Challenger | Clay | (Brazil) Thiago Seyboth Wild | 5–7, 1–6 |
| Win | 6–9 | Jul 2023 | Iasi, Romania | Challenger | Clay | (Spain) Bernabe Zapata Miralles | 3–6, 6–0, 6–4 |
| Win | 7–9 | Jul 2023 | Trieste, Italy | Challenger | Clay | (Italy) Francesco Passaro | 6–2, 5–7, 6–2 |
| Win | 8–9 | Jun 2024 | Lyon, France | Challenger | Clay | (France) Alexandre Muller | 6–2, 1–6, 6–1 |
| Win | 9–9 | Sep 2025 | Rennes, France | Challenger | Hard (i) | (Switzerland) Stan Wawrinka | 6–4, 6–4 |
| Loss | 9–10 | Oct 2025 | Roanne, France | Challenger | Hard (i) | (Finland) Otto Virtanen | 1–6, 6–3, 3–6 |
| Win | 10–10 | Oct 2025 | Brest, France | Challenger | Hard (i) | (United States) Eliot Spizzirri | 2–6, 6–2, 6–1 |
| Loss | 10–11 | Jul 2026 | Braunschweig, Germany | Challenger | Clay | (United Kingdom) Jan Choinski | 6–4, 0–6, 4–6 |

=== Doubles: 4 (2 titles, 2 runner-ups) ===
| Legend ATP Challenger Tour (0–2) ITF Futures/WTT (2–0) | Finals by surface Hard (0–0) Clay (2–2) Grass (0–0) Carpet (0–0) |

| Result | W–L | Date | Tournament | Tier | Surface | Partner | Opponents | Score |
|---|---|---|---|---|---|---|---|---|
| Win | 1–0 | May 2018 | France F9, Grasse | Futures | Clay | (France) Clément Tabur | (France) Corentin Denolly (France) Alexandre Müller | 6–2, 6–4 |
| Win | 2–0 | Jul 2019 | M25 Gandia, Spain | WTT | Clay | (France) Jonathan Eysseric | (Colombia) Alejandro Gómez (United States) Junior Alexander Ore | 6–4, 1–6, [10–4] |
| Loss | 2–1 | Aug 2020 | Todi, Italy | Challenger | Clay | (France) Elliot Benchetrit | (Uruguay) Ariel Behar (Kazakhstan) Andrey Golubev | 4–6, 2–6 |
| Loss | 2–2 | Aug 2020 | Trieste, Italy | Challenger | Clay | (France) Tristan Lamasine | (Uruguay) Ariel Behar (Kazakhstan) Andrey Golubev | 4–6, 2–6 |

== Youth Olympics medals ==
=== Singles ===
| Outcome | Year | Championship | Surface | Opponent | Score |
|---|---|---|---|---|---|
| Gold | 2018 | Buenos Aires Youth Olympics | Hard | (Argentina) Facundo Diaz Acosta | 6–4, 7–5 |

=== Doubles ===
| Outcome | Year | Championship | Surface | Partner | Opponents | Score |
|---|---|---|---|---|---|---|
| Bronze | 2018 | Buenos Aires Youth Olympics | Hard | (France) Clément Tabur | (Czech Republic) Ondřej Štyler (Czech Republic) Dalibor Svrčina | 6–7^{(4–7)}, 7–5, [10–8] |

== Wins over top 10 players ==
- Gaston has a 1–4 record against players who were, at the time the match was played, ranked in the top 10.

| Season | 2024 | 2025 | Total |
|---|---|---|---|
| Wins | 1 | 0 | 1 |

| # | Player | Rank | Event | Surface | Rd | Score | HGR |
|---|---|---|---|---|---|---|---|
2024
| 1. | (Australia) Alex de Minaur | 9 | European Open, Belgium | Hard (i) | QF | 6–3, 3–6, 7–5 | 77 |

*As of 18 October 2024
