= Matteo Martineau =

French tennis player

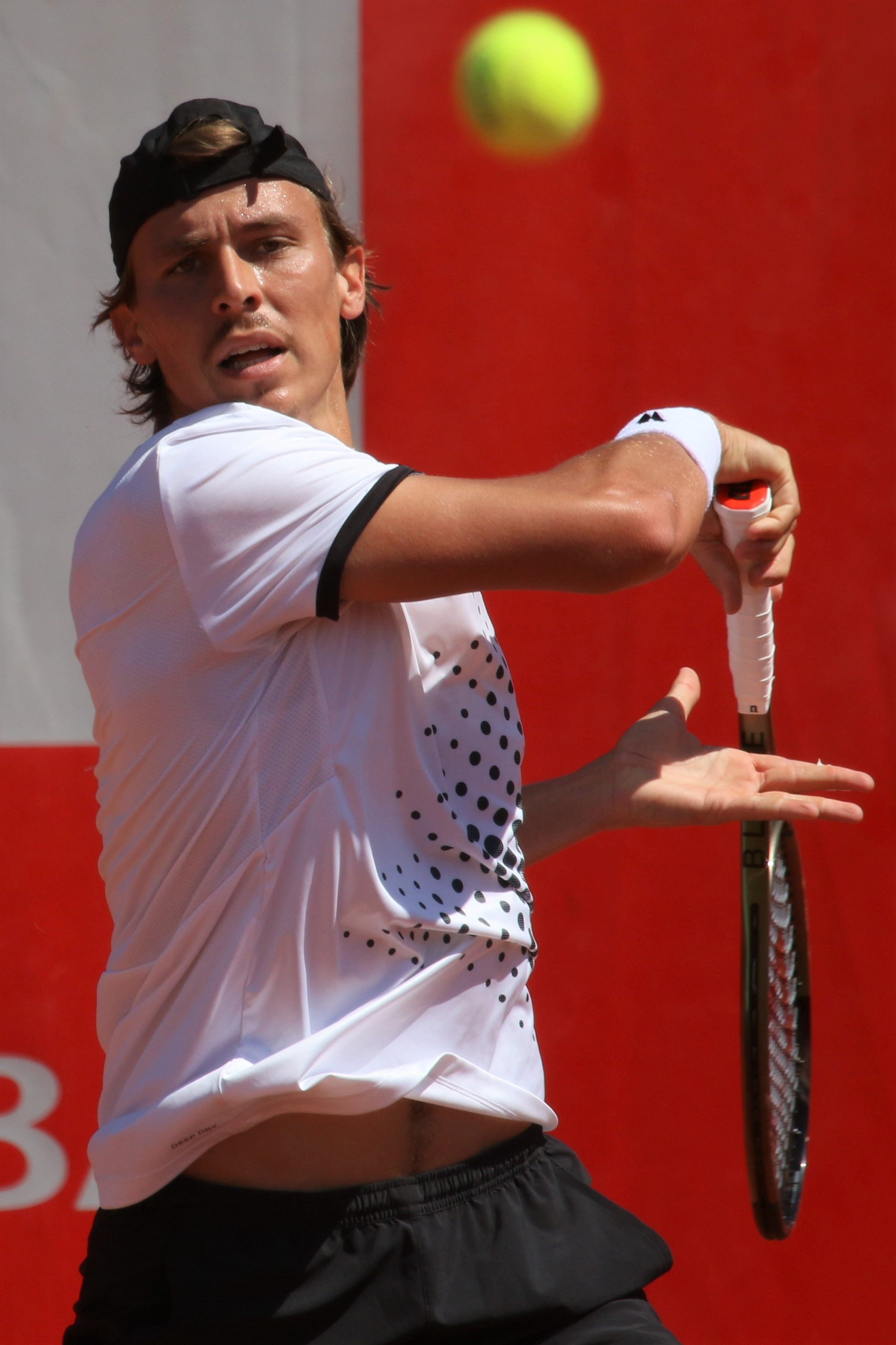
- Martineau 2022 in Bordeaux
- Country (sports): France
- Born: 16 January 1999 (age 27) Angers, France
- Height: 1.83 m (6 ft 0 in)
- Plays: Right-handed (one-handed backhand)
- Prize money: US $602,712

Singles
- Career record: 0–2
- Career titles: 0
- Highest ranking: No. 170 (1 July 2024)
- Current ranking: No. 244 (2 November 2026)

Grand Slam singles results
- Australian Open: Q1 (2025)
- French Open: Q2 (2019, 2025)
- Wimbledon: Q1 (2024)
- US Open: Q1 (2024)

Doubles
- Career record: 1–1
- Career titles: 0
- Highest ranking: No. 220 (20 May 2024)
- Current ranking: No. 280 (5 January 2026)
- Last updated on: 6 January 2026.

Matteo Martineau (born 16 January 1999) is a French tennis player who competes on the ATP Challenger Tour. He has a career high ATP singles ranking of world No. 170 achieved on 1 July 2024. He also has a career high ATP doubles ranking of world No. 220 achieved on 20 May 2024.

== Professional career ==
=== 2018: First ITF title ===
In October, Martineau won his first ITF title in Saint-Dizier, France, defeating fellow countryman Corentin Denolly in the final.

=== 2019: Grand Slam qualifying debut ===
In June, Martineau played his first Grand Slam qualifying match at the French Open, reaching the second round.

=== 2023: ATP Tour debut, top 300 ===
In November, Martineau made his ATP Tour debut at the 2023 Moselle Open after entering the singles main draw as a lucky loser. He lost to Dominic Thiem in the first round. At the same tournament, Martineau recorded his first ATP win in doubles by reaching the quarterfinal, playing along with Ugo Blanchet, after the pair received a wildcard to the main draw.

=== 2024: First Challenger final, top 175 ===
In February, Martineau reached his first singles final on the ATP Challenger Tour at the 2024 Lexus Nottingham Challenger, losing to fellow countryman Giovanni Mpetshi Perricard in the final. The following week, he reached his second Challenger final at the 2024 Challenger La Manche, losing to fourth seed Zsombor Piros in the final. As a result, Martineau broke into the top 200 for the first time on 19 February 2024 at No. 189 in the rankings.

In March, Martineau won his first doubles title on the ATP Challenger Tour at the 2024 Kiskút Open paired with Titouan Droguet.

In June, Martineau qualified for the main draw at the Stuttgart Open, his second career match on the ATP Tour, losing to Denis Shapovalov in the first round.

In October, Martineau reached his third Challenger final of the season in Roanne, losing to fellow countryman Benjamin Bonzi in the final.

=== 2026: Maiden Challenger title ===
In November, Martineau won his maiden Challenger single title at the Taranto Tennis Cup, defeating Kilian Feldbausch in the final.

== Performance timeline ==
Tournament	2019	2020	2021	2022	2023	2024	2025	2026	2027	SR	W–L	Win%
Grand Slam tournaments
Australian Open	A	A	A	A	A	A	Q1	A		0 / 0	0–0	–
French Open	Q2	A	Q1	A	A	Q1	Q2	A		0 / 0	0–0	–
Wimbledon	A	A	A	A	A	Q1	A	A		0 / 0	0–0	–
US Open	A	A	A	A	A	Q1	A	A		0 / 0	0–0	–
Win–loss	0–0	0–0	0–0	0–0	0–0	0–0	0–0	0–0	0–0	0 / 0	0–0	–

== ATP Challenger Tour finals ==
=== Singles: 6 (1 title, 5 runner-ups) ===
Legend ATP Challenger Tour (1–5)	Finals by surface Hard (1–4) Clay (0–1)

Result	W–L	Date	Tournament	Tier	Surface	Opponent	Score
Loss	0–1	Feb 2024	Nottingham, United Kingdom	Challenger	Hard (i)	(France) Giovanni Mpetshi Perricard	6–7^{(2–7)}, 4–6
Loss	0–2	Feb 2024	Cherbourg, France	Challenger	Hard (i)	(Hungary) Zsombor Piros	3–6, 4–6
Loss	0–3	Oct 2024	Open de Roanne, France	Challenger	Hard (i)	(France) Benjamin Bonzi	5–7, 1–6
Loss	0–4	Jul 2026	Open Castilla y León, Spain	Challenger	Clay	(France) Luka Pavlovic	4–6, 6–3, 1–6
Loss	0–5	Oct 2026	Open de Roanne, France	Challenger	Hard (i)	(Switzerland) Mika Brunold	6–2, 6–7^{(5–7)}, 1–6
Win	1–5	Nov 2026	Taranto Tennis Cup, Itlay	Challenger	Hard	(Switzerland) Kilian Feldbausch	6–3, 6–2

=== Doubles: 3 (1 title, 2 runner-ups) ===
Legend ATP Challenger Tour (1–2)

Result	W–L	Date	Tournament	Tier	Surface	Partner	Opponents	Score
Win	1–0	Mar 2024	Székesfehérvár, Hungary	Challenger	Clay (i)	(France) Titouan Droguet	(Sweden) André Göransson (Ukraine) Denys Molchanov	4–6, 7–5, [10–8]
Loss	1–1	Sep 2024	Cassis, France	Challenger	Hard	(France) Manuel Guinard	(Portugal) Jaime Faria (Portugal) Henrique Rocha	6–7^{(5–7)}, 4–6
Loss	1–2	Mar 2025	Thionville, France	Challenger	Hard	(France) Luca Sanchez	(Switzerland) Jakub Paul (Netherlands) David Pel	1–6, 4–6

== ITF Futures/World Tennis Tour finals ==
=== Singles: 11 (5 titles, 6 runner-ups) ===
Legend ITF Futures/WTT (5–6)	Finals by surface Hard (2–3) Clay (3–2) Grass (0–0) Carpet (0–1)

Result	W–L	Date	Tournament	Tier	Surface	Opponent	Score
Loss	0–1	Feb 2018	Tunisia F6, Djerba	Futures	Hard	(Morocco) Elliot Benchetrit	3–6, 2–6
Loss	0–2	Aug 2018	Switzerland F4, Neuchatel	Futures	Clay	(Germany) Peter Heller	6–4, 3–6, 4–6
Win	1–2	Oct 2018	France F21, Saint-Dizier	Futures	Hard (i)	(France) Corentin Denolly	6–7^{(5–7)}, 6–3, 6–4
Loss	1–3	Mar 2019	M15 Poitiers, France	WTT	Hard (i)	(France) Quentin Robert	4–6, 4–6
Win	2–3	Sep 2019	M15 Piombino, Italy	WTT	Hard	(France) Hugo Gaston	2–6, 7–6^{(8–6)}, 7–6^{(7–3)},
Loss	2–4	Jan 2020	M15 Bagnoles-de-l'Orne, France	WTT	Clay (i)	(France) Jules Marie	3–6, 4–6
Loss	2–5	Jan 2021	M15 Bressuire, France	WTT	Hard (i)	(Denmark) Holger Rune	5–7, 6–4, 3–6
Win	3–5	Apr 2021	M25 Reus, Spain	WTT	Clay	(United States) Emilio Nava	6–4, 2–6, 7–6^{(7–4)}
Win	4–5	Aug 2021	M25 Lesa, Italy	WTT	Clay	(Italy) Alessandro Bega	7–5, 2–6, 6–2
Loss	4–6	Jan 2023	M25 Nussloch, Germany	WTT	Carpet	(Germany) Daniel Masur	3–6, 6–2, 6–7^{(1–7)}
Win	5–6	Aug 2023	M25 Muttenz, Switzerland	WTT	Clay	(Italy) Alexander Weis	6–1, 6–7^{(4–7)}, 6–3

=== Doubles: 3 (2 titles, 1 runner-up) ===
Legend ITF WTT (2–1)

Result	W–L	Date	Tournament	Tier	Surface	Partner	Opponents	Score
Win	1–0	Mar 2019	M15 Poitiers, France	WTT	Hard (i)	(France) Clément Tabur	(France) Tony Bourcet (France) Antoine Escoffier	6–3, 6–4
Win	2–0	Mar 2020	M25 Potchefstroom, South Africa	WTT	Hard	(France) Benjamin Bonzi	(Republic of Ireland) Simon Carr (France) Corentin Denolly	6–4, 6–2
Loss	2–1	May 2023	M25 Carnac, France	WTT	Clay	(France) Clément Tabur	(France) Maxence Broville (Argentina) Federico Agustín Gómez	6–7^{(5–7)}, 2–6
