= Open International de Tennis de Roanne =

Open de Roanne
- 2025 Open de Roanne

ATP Challenger Tour
- Event name: Open Auvergne-Rhône-Alpes de Roanne
- Location: Roanne, France
- Venue: Halle André Vacheresse (2024-), Le Scarabée (2021-2022)
- Category: Challenger 100
- Surface: Hard (Indoor) - (Slamcourt)
- Draw: 32S/32Q/16D
- Prize money: €145,250 (2025), €120,950 (2024)
- Website: openderoanne.com

The Open Auvergne-Rhône-Alpes de Roanne (formerly Open International de Tennis de Roanne) is a professional tennis tournament played on hardcourts. It is currently part of the ATP Challenger Tour. It is held annually in Roanne, France since 2021.

== Past finals ==
=== Singles ===
Year	Champion	Runner-up	Score
2026	(Switzerland) Mika Brunold	(France) Matteo Martineau	2–6, 7–6^{(7–5)}, 6–1
2025	(Finland) Otto Virtanen	(France) Hugo Gaston	6–1, 3–6, 6–3
2024	(France) Benjamin Bonzi	(France) Matteo Martineau	7–5, 6–1
2023	Not held		
2022	(France) Hugo Gaston	(Switzerland) Henri Laaksonen	6–7^{(6–8)}, 7–5, 6–1
2021	(France) Hugo Grenier	(Japan) Hiroki Moriya	6–2, 6–3

=== Doubles ===
Year	Champions	Runners-up	Score
2026	(Monaco) Romain Arneodo (Germany) Hendrik Jebens	(United Kingdom) David Stevenson (United Kingdom) Marcus Willis	6–4, 6–4
2025	(United States) Vasil Kirkov (Netherlands) Bart Stevens	(Belgium) Joran Vliegen (United States) Jackson Withrow	4–6, 6–1, [10–4]
2024	(Colombia) Nicolás Barrientos (Netherlands) David Pel	(Switzerland) Jakub Paul (Czech Republic) Matěj Vocel	4–6, 6–3, [10–6]
2023	Not held		
2022	(France) Sadio Doumbia (France) Fabien Reboul	(Jamaica) Dustin Brown (Poland) Szymon Walków	7–6^{(7–5)}, 6–4
2021	(United Kingdom) Lloyd Glasspool (Finland) Harri Heliövaara	(Monaco) Romain Arneodo (France) Albano Olivetti	7–6^{(7–5)}, 6–7^{(5–7)}, [12–10]
