= 2021 Platzmann-Sauerland Open – Doubles =

Doubles
- 2021 Platzmann-Sauerland Open

Final
- Champions: (Croatia) Ivan Sabanov (Croatia) Matej Sabanov
- Runners-up: (Ukraine) Denys Molchanov (Kazakhstan) Aleksandr Nedovyesov
- Score: 6–4, 2–6, [12–10]

Events
| Singles | Doubles |
| Platzmann-Sauerland Open | · 2022 → |

This was the first edition of the tournament.

Ivan and Matej Sabanov won the title after defeating Denys Molchanov and Aleksandr Nedovyesov 6–4, 2–6, [12–10] in the final.

== Seeds ==
1. (Ukraine) Denys Molchanov / (Kazakhstan) Aleksandr Nedovyesov (final)
2. (Czech Republic) Roman Jebavý / (Slovakia) Igor Zelenay (first round)
3. (Germany) Andre Begemann / (France) Albano Olivetti (semifinals)
4. (Croatia) Ivan Sabanov / (Croatia) Matej Sabanov (champions)

== Draw ==
Key

- Q = Qualifier
- WC = Wild card
- LL = Lucky loser
- Alt = Alternate
- ITF = ITF entry
- PR = Protected ranking
- SR = Special ranking
- SE = Special exempt
- JE = Junior exempt
- JR = Junior Accelerator Programme entrant
- CO = College Accelerator Programme entrant
- NG = Next Gen Accelerator Program entrant
- w/o = Walkover
- r = Retired
- d = Defaulted

First round
1 | (Ukraine) D Molchanov (Kazakhstan) A Nedovyesov | 6 | 7
(Germany) J Lenz (Netherlands) S Verbeek | 4 | 5
(Argentina) JM Cerúndolo (Peru) A Merino | 3 | 6 | [10]
(Philippines) R Gonzales (South Africa) R Roelofse | 6 | 3 | [6]
3 | (Germany) A Begemann (France) A Olivetti | 6 | 6
(Croatia) D Ajduković (Bosnia and Herzegovina) M Bašić | 0 | 2
WC | (Germany) M Möller (Germany) T Sandkaulen | 6 | 6
(Croatia) A Šančić (New Zealand) A Sitak | 1 | 2
WC | (Germany) D Brown (Syria) H Naw | 6^{7} | 6 | [7]
(Uruguay) M Cuevas (Argentina) F Mena | 7^{9} | 1 | [10]
(Poland) K Drzewiecki (Spain) S Martos Gornés | 5 | 2
4 | (Croatia) I Sabanov (Croatia) M Sabanov | 7 | 6
(Spain) A Menéndez Maceiras (Brazil) F Romboli | 6 | 6
WC | (Germany) Lennart Fastabend (Germany) Ludger Fastabend | 0 | 2
(Mexico) H Hach Verdugo (Mexico) MÁ Reyes-Varela | 5 | 7^{7} | [10]
2 | (Czech Republic) R Jebavý (Slovakia) I Zelenay | 7 | 6^{4} | [8]

Quarterfinals
1 | (Ukraine) D Molchanov (Kazakhstan) A Nedovyesov | 6 | 6
(Argentina) JM Cerúndolo (Peru) A Merino | 3 | 1
3 | (Germany) A Begemann (France) A Olivetti | 6 | 6
WC | (Germany) M Möller (Germany) T Sandkaulen | 1 | 3
(Uruguay) M Cuevas (Argentina) F Mena | 4 | 2
4 | (Croatia) I Sabanov (Croatia) M Sabanov | 6 | 6
(Spain) A Menéndez Maceiras (Brazil) F Romboli | 3 | 6 | [12]
(Mexico) H Hach Verdugo (Mexico) MÁ Reyes-Varela | 6 | 3 | [14]

Semifinals
1 | (Ukraine) D Molchanov (Kazakhstan) A Nedovyesov | 7^{7} | 7
3 | (Germany) A Begemann (France) A Olivetti | 6^{4} | 5
4 | (Croatia) I Sabanov (Croatia) M Sabanov | 6 | 3 | [10]
(Mexico) H Hach Verdugo (Mexico) MÁ Reyes-Varela | 2 | 6 | [6]

Final
1 | (Ukraine) D Molchanov (Kazakhstan) A Nedovyesov | 4 | 6 | [10]
4 | (Croatia) I Sabanov (Croatia) M Sabanov | 6 | 2 | [12]
