= 2025 Platzmann Open – Singles =

Singles
- 2025 Platzmann Open

Final
- Champion: (Germany) Yannick Hanfmann
- Runner-up: (Netherlands) Guy den Ouden
- Score: 3–6, 6–2, 6–2

Events
Singles	Doubles
← 2024 ·	Platzmann Open	· 2026 →

Raphaël Collignon was the defending champion but chose not to defend his title.

Yannick Hanfmann won the title after defeating Guy den Ouden 3–6, 6–2, 6–2 in the final.

== Seeds ==
1. (Netherlands) Botic van de Zandschulp (quarterfinals)
2. (Lithuania) Vilius Gaubas (quarterfinals)
3. (Germany) Yannick Hanfmann (champion)
4. (Switzerland) Jérôme Kym (semifinals)
5. (United Kingdom) Jan Choinski (quarterfinals)
6. (Netherlands) Guy den Ouden (final)
7. (Argentina) Facundo Díaz Acosta (withdrew)
8. (Lebanon) Benjamin Hassan (first round)
9. (Austria) Jurij Rodionov (first round)

== Draw ==
Key

- Q = Qualifier
- WC = Wild card
- LL = Lucky loser
- Alt = Alternate
- ITF = ITF entry
- PR = Protected ranking
- SR = Special ranking
- SE = Special exempt
- JE = Junior exempt
- JR = Junior Accelerator Programme entrant
- CO = College Accelerator Programme entrant
- NG = Next Gen Accelerator Program entrant
- w/o = Walkover
- r = Retired
- d = Defaulted

=== Finals ===
Semifinals
6	(Netherlands) Guy den Ouden	6	6
4	(Switzerland) Jérôme Kym	1	2
3	(Germany) Yannick Hanfmann	6	6
Q	(Sweden) Olle Wallin	3	4

Final
6	(Netherlands) Guy den Ouden	6	2	2
3	(Germany) Yannick Hanfmann	3	6	6

=== Top half ===
First round
1	(Netherlands) B van de Zandschulp	6	6
Q	(Croatia) L Mikrut	4	2
(Germany) J Engel	6^{4}	2
WC	(Germany) D Masur	7^{7}	6
LL	(United States) Dali Blanch	5	6	3
(Germany) C Negritu	7	4	6
Q	(Argentina) G Villanueva	2	3
6	(Netherlands) G den Ouden	6	6
4	(Switzerland) J Kym	6	6
(Belgium) K Coppejans	2	3
(Brazil) JL Reis da Silva	2	3
Alt	(Italy) M Cecchinato	6	6
(Spain) C Sánchez Jover	2	2
Alt	(India) S Nagal	6	6
WC	(Germany) N McDonald	6	6
9	(Austria) J Rodionov	4	3

Second round
1	(Netherlands) B van de Zandschulp	6	6
WC	(Germany) D Masur	4	1
(Germany) C Negritu	6^{5}	7^{7}	3
6	(Netherlands) G den Ouden	7^{7}	6^{4}	6
4	(Switzerland) J Kym	6	6
Alt	(Italy) M Cecchinato	1	4
Alt	(India) S Nagal	2	6	4
WC	(Germany) N McDonald	6	4	6

Quarterfinals
1	(Netherlands) B van de Zandschulp	6^{2}	6	3
6	(Netherlands) G den Ouden	7^{7}	4	6
4	(Switzerland) J Kym	3	6	6
WC	(Germany) N McDonald	6	3	2

Semifinals
6	(Netherlands) G den Ouden	6	6
4	(Switzerland) J Kym	1	2

=== Bottom half ===
First round
5	(United Kingdom) J Choinski	4	6	7^{7}
(Italy) L Giustino	6	3	6^{1}
(Kazakhstan) D Popko	3	6	6
Q	(United Kingdom) A Matusevich	6	3	4
(Kazakhstan) T Skatov	6	6
Q	(Bulgaria) A Donski	1	3
CO	(Japan) JD Hara Friend	5	2
3	(Germany) Y Hanfmann	7	6
8	(Lebanon) B Hassan	4	4
(France) C Tabur	6	6
Q	(Sweden) O Wallin	6	6
WC	(Germany) M Schönhaus	2	3
Q	(Argentina) M Kestelboim	3	6	6^{3}
NG	(Austria) J Schwärzler	6	3	7^{7}
(Argentina) L Midón	3	7^{7}	1
2	(Lithuania) V Gaubas	6	6^{2}	6

Second round
5	(United Kingdom) J Choinski	3	6	6
(Kazakhstan) D Popko	6	1	4
(Kazakhstan) T Skatov	6	4	6^{6}
3	(Germany) Y Hanfmann	3	6	7^{8}
(France) C Tabur	4	3
Q	(Sweden) O Wallin	6	6
NG	(Austria) J Schwärzler	4	2
2	(Lithuania) V Gaubas	6	6

Quarterfinals
5	(United Kingdom) J Choinski	6^{6}	4
3	(Germany) Y Hanfmann	7^{8}	6
Q	(Sweden) O Wallin	7^{7}	7^{12}
2	(Lithuania) V Gaubas	6^{4}	6^{10}

Semifinals
3	(Germany) Y Hanfmann	6	6
Q	(Sweden) O Wallin	3	4
