= 2021 Platzmann-Sauerland Open – Singles =

Singles
- 2021 Platzmann-Sauerland Open

Final
- Champion: (Germany) Daniel Altmaier
- Runner-up: (Chile) Nicolás Jarry
- Score: 7–6^{(7–1)}, 4–6, 6–3

Events
Singles	Doubles
Platzmann-Sauerland Open	· 2022 →

This was the first edition of the tournament.

Daniel Altmaier won the title after defeating Nicolás Jarry 7–6^{(7–1)}, 4–6, 6–3 in the final.

== Seeds ==
1. (Spain) Pablo Andújar (first round)
2. (Spain) Pedro Martínez (first round)
3. (Spain) Roberto Carballés Baena (second round, retired)
4. (Germany) Daniel Altmaier (champion)
5. (Bolivia) Hugo Dellien (withdrew)
6. (Argentina) Juan Manuel Cerúndolo (semifinals)
7. (Russia) Roman Safiullin (second round)
8. (Netherlands) Robin Haase (second round, withdrew)
9. (France) Constant Lestienne (second round)

== Draw ==
Key

- Q = Qualifier
- WC = Wild card
- LL = Lucky loser
- Alt = Alternate
- ITF = ITF entry
- PR = Protected ranking
- SR = Special ranking
- SE = Special exempt
- JE = Junior exempt
- JR = Junior Accelerator Programme entrant
- CO = College Accelerator Programme entrant
- NG = Next Gen Accelerator Program entrant
- w/o = Walkover
- r = Retired
- d = Defaulted

=== Finals ===
Semifinals
(Germany) Julian Lenz	1	4
(Chile) Nicolás Jarry	6	6
4	(Germany) Daniel Altmaier	6	7^{7}
6	(Argentina) Juan Manuel Cerúndolo	2	6^{4}

Final
(Chile) Nicolás Jarry	6^{1}	6	3
4	(Germany) Daniel Altmaier	7^{7}	4	6

=== Top half ===
First round
1	(Spain) P Andújar	7	5	0
(Bosnia and Herzegovina) M Bašić	5	7	6
(France) T Lamasine	6	6
(Russia) E Karlovskiy	3	3
(Germany) J Lenz	5	7	6
WC	(Japan) S Mochizuki	7	5	2
(Spain) A Menéndez Maceiras	2	7^{7}	4
7	(Russia) R Safiullin	6	6^{0}	6
3	(Spain) R Carballés Baena	6	7^{7}
Alt	(Argentina) N Kicker	4	6^{3}
(Chile) N Jarry	1	7^{7}	7^{8}
(Slovakia) L Klein	6	6^{5}	6^{6}
(Croatia) D Ajduković	6	7
(France) E Furness	3	5
Alt	(Netherlands) J Sels	3	5
9	(France) C Lestienne	6	7

Second round
(Bosnia and Herzegovina) M Bašić	7^{7}	6
(France) T Lamasine	6^{2}	2
(Germany) J Lenz	5	6	6
7	(Russia) R Safiullin	7	4	2
3	(Spain) R Carballés Baena	1^{r}
(Chile) N Jarry	5
(Croatia) D Ajduković	6	6
9	(France) C Lestienne	2	4

Quarterfinals
(Bosnia and Herzegovina) M Bašić	5	5
(Germany) J Lenz	7	7
(Chile) N Jarry	6	7^{7}
(Croatia) D Ajduković	4	6^{5}

Semifinals
(Germany) J Lenz	1	4
(Chile) N Jarry	6	6

=== Bottom half ===
First round
8	(Netherlands) R Haase	6	6
(Dominican Republic) R Cid Subervi	3	1
Q	(Spain) J Barranco Cosano	6	6
(Argentina) F Mena	3	4
(Germany) M Zverev	3	1
PR	(Belgium) J Cagnina	6	6
Q	(Argentina) GA Olivieri	2	2
4	(Germany) D Altmaier	6	6
6	(Argentina) JM Cerúndolo	6	6
(Czech Republic) M Vrbenský	4	2
Q	(Romania) FC Jianu	7	3	6
WC	(Germany) R Molleker	5	6	3
Q	(France) M Martineau	6	6
WC	(Germany) M Möller	0	2
(Argentina) C Ugo Carabelli	6	4	7^{7}
2	(Spain) P Martínez	2	6	6^{5}

Second round
8	(Netherlands) R Haase
Q	(Spain) J Barranco Cosano	w/o
PR	(Belgium) J Cagnina	6^{1}	3
4	(Germany) D Altmaier	7^{7}	6
6	(Argentina) JM Cerúndolo	6	6
Q	(Romania) FC Jianu	2	2
Q	(France) M Martineau	4	6^{5}
(Argentina) C Ugo Carabelli	6	7^{7}

Quarterfinals
Q	(Spain) J Barranco Cosano	4	7^{7}	5
4	(Germany) D Altmaier	6	6^{5}	7
6	(Argentina) JM Cerúndolo	3	6	6
(Argentina) C Ugo Carabelli	6	3	2

Semifinals
4	(Germany) D Altmaier	6	7^{7}
6	(Argentina) JM Cerúndolo	2	6^{4}
