= 2024 Platzmann-Sauerland Open – Doubles =

Doubles
- 2024 Platzmann-Sauerland Open

Final
- Champions: (Netherlands) David Pel (Netherlands) Bart Stevens
- Runners-up: (Netherlands) Matwé Middelkoop (Ukraine) Denys Molchanov
- Score: 6–4, 2–6, [10–8]

Events
Singles	Doubles
- Platzmann-Sauerland Open

Luca Margaroli and Santiago Rodríguez Taverna were the defending champions but chose not to defend their title.

David Pel and Bart Stevens won the title after defeating Matwé Middelkoop and Denys Molchanov 6–4, 2–6, [10–8] in the final.

== Seeds ==
1. (Romania) Victor Vlad Cornea / (Austria) Sam Weissborn (first round)
2. (Netherlands) Matwé Middelkoop / (Ukraine) Denys Molchanov (final)
3. (Germany) Jakob Schnaitter / (Germany) Mark Wallner (first round)
4. (Brazil) Fernando Romboli / (Brazil) Marcelo Zormann (quarterfinals)

== Draw ==
Key

- Q = Qualifier
- WC = Wild card
- LL = Lucky loser
- Alt = Alternate
- ITF = ITF entry
- PR = Protected ranking
- SR = Special ranking
- SE = Special exempt
- JE = Junior exempt
- JR = Junior Accelerator Programme entrant
- CO = College Accelerator Programme entrant
- NG = Next Gen Accelerator Program entrant
- w/o = Walkover
- r = Retired
- d = Defaulted

=== Draw ===
First round
1	(Romania) V Cornea (Austria) S Weissborn	6	6^{4}	[8]
(Netherlands) D Pel (Netherlands) B Stevens	4	7^{7}	[10]
(Italy) F Romano (Italy) Augusto Virgili	6	6^{0}	[8]
WC	(Germany) T Gentzsch (Germany) M Schönhaus	3	7^{7}	[10]
4	(Brazil) F Romboli (Brazil) M Zormann	7^{7}	3	[10]
(Sweden) F Bergevi (Netherlands) M Veldheer	6^{4}	6	[8]
(Germany) M Topo (Ukraine) V Uzhylovskyi	3	6^{2}
(Croatia) Z Babić (Bulgaria) A Donski	6	7^{7}
(Spain) Í Cervantes (Argentina) G Durán	6	6
(Austria) D Pichler (Austria) J Rodionov	4	2
(United Kingdom) D Stevenson (United Kingdom) M Willis	7^{7}	6^{2}	[10]
3	(Germany) J Schnaitter (Germany) M Wallner	6^{5}	7^{7}	[6]
WC	(Germany) Tim Hammes (Germany) Moritz Pieper	5	5
(Japan) S Watanabe (Japan) T Yuzuki	7	7
(Serbia) I Sabanov (Serbia) M Sabanov	4	4
2	(Netherlands) M Middelkoop (Ukraine) D Molchanov	6	6

Quarterfinals
(Netherlands) D Pel (Netherlands) B Stevens	6	6
WC	(Germany) T Gentzsch (Germany) M Schönhaus	4	4
4	(Brazil) F Romboli (Brazil) M Zormann	6^{4}	6	[7]
(Croatia) Z Babić (Bulgaria) A Donski	7^{7}	3	[10]
(Spain) Í Cervantes (Argentina) G Durán	4	6^{1}
(United Kingdom) D Stevenson (United Kingdom) M Willis	6	7^{7}
(Japan) S Watanabe (Japan) T Yuzuki	2	2
2	(Netherlands) M Middelkoop (Ukraine) D Molchanov	6	6

Semifinals
(Netherlands) D Pel (Netherlands) B Stevens	6	3	[11]
(Croatia) Z Babić (Bulgaria) A Donski	4	6	[9]
(United Kingdom) D Stevenson (United Kingdom) M Willis	4	4
2	(Netherlands) M Middelkoop (Ukraine) D Molchanov	6	6

Final
(Netherlands) D Pel (Netherlands) B Stevens	6	2	[10]
2	(Netherlands) M Middelkoop (Ukraine) D Molchanov	4	6	[8]
