= 2026 Platzmann Open – Singles =

Singles
- 2026 Platzmann Open

Final
- Champion: (Germany) Tom Gentzsch
- Runner-up: (Switzerland) Jérôme Kym
- Score: 6–4, 7–6^{(7–4)}

Events
Singles	Doubles
- Platzmann Open

Yannick Hanfmann was the defending champion but chose not to defend his title.

Tom Gentzsch won the title after defeating Jérôme Kym 6–4, 7–6^{(7–4)} in the final.

== Seeds ==
1. (Slovakia) Alex Molčan (first round, retired)
2. (United Kingdom) Jan Choinski (withdrew)
3. (Hungary) Zsombor Piros (semifinals)
4. (Lithuania) Vilius Gaubas (first round)
5. (France) Alexandre Müller (first round)
6. (Italy) Stefano Travaglia (first round)
7. (Kazakhstan) Timofey Skatov (first round)
8. (Czech Republic) Zdeněk Kolář (first round)

== Draw ==
Key

- Q = Qualifier
- WC = Wild card
- LL = Lucky loser
- Alt = Alternate
- ITF = ITF entry
- PR = Protected ranking
- SR = Special ranking
- SE = Special exempt
- JE = Junior exempt
- JR = Junior Accelerator Programme entrant
- CO = College Accelerator Programme entrant
- NG = Next Gen Accelerator Program entrant
- w/o = Walkover
- r = Retired
- d = Defaulted

=== Finals ===
Semifinals
(Germany) Tom Gentzsch	6	6
3	(Hungary) Zsombor Piros	4	4
(Switzerland) Jérôme Kym	6	7^{7}
(Denmark) Elmer Møller	1	6^{4}

Final
(Germany) Tom Gentzsch	6	7^{7}
(Switzerland) Jérôme Kym	4	6^{4}

=== Top half ===
First round
1	(Slovakia) A Molčan	6	3	0^{r}
(Chinese Taipei) C-h Tseng	2	6	2
Q	(Brazil) T Monteiro	3	7^{7}	4
(Germany) T Gentzsch	6	6^{5}	6
(Argentina) FA Gómez	2	5
(Germany) H Squire	6	7
Alt	(Argentina) A Barrena	7^{7}	6
7	(Kazakhstan) T Skatov	6^{4}	2
3	(Hungary) Z Piros	7^{7}	6
(Spain) D Rincón	6^{1}	0
Q	(Czech Republic) D Reček	5	2
WC	(Germany) D Dedura	7	6
Q	(Germany) R Molleker	3	3
Q	(Czech Republic) M Mrva	6	6
(Netherlands) G den Ouden	7	6
5	(France) A Müller	5	2

Second round
(Chinese Taipei) C-h Tseng	1	6	1
(Germany) T Gentzsch	6	1	6
(Germany) H Squire	6	6
Alt	(Argentina) A Barrena	4	1
3	(Hungary) Z Piros	6	6
WC	(Germany) D Dedura	3	2
Q	(Czech Republic) M Mrva	4	2
(Netherlands) G den Ouden	6	6

Quarterfinals
(Germany) T Gentzsch	6	7^{7}
(Germany) H Squire	3	6^{5}
3	(Hungary) Z Piros	6	6
(Netherlands) G den Ouden	4	1

Semifinals
(Germany) T Gentzsch	6	6
3	(Hungary) Z Piros	4	4

=== Bottom half ===
First round
6	(Italy) S Travaglia	5	3
Q	(Croatia) M Dodig	7	6
(Italy) L Giustino	3	7^{7}	6
(Ukraine) V Sachko	6	6^{3}	4
WC	(Germany) N McDonald	3	3
(Switzerland) J Kym	6	6
(Netherlands) M Houkes	2	6	6
4	(Lithuania) V Gaubas	6	4	4
8	(Czech Republic) Z Kolář	4	4
(Italy) R Brancaccio	6	6
(Denmark) E Møller	6	6
SE	(Germany) J Mackenzie	3	2
(Spain) C Taberner	6	6
Q	(Argentina) JB Torres	2	0
WC	(Germany) M Schönhaus	7	3	6^{3}
LL	(Germany) M Topo	5	6	7^{7}

Second round
Q	(Croatia) M Dodig	6	5	6^{4}
(Italy) L Giustino	4	7	7^{7}
(Switzerland) J Kym	6	7^{7}
(Netherlands) M Houkes	3	6^{4}
(Italy) R Brancaccio	6^{4}	6^{2}
(Denmark) E Møller	7^{7}	7^{7}
(Spain) C Taberner	3	6	6
LL	(Germany) M Topo	6	3	3

Quarterfinals
(Italy) L Giustino	3	6^{4}
(Switzerland) J Kym	6	7^{7}
(Denmark) E Møller	7^{7}	7
(Spain) C Taberner	6^{4}	5

Semifinals
(Switzerland) J Kym	6	7^{7}
(Denmark) E Møller	1	6^{4}
