= 2026 Platzmann Open – Doubles =

Doubles
- 2026 Platzmann Open

Final
- Champions: (Croatia) Admir Kalender (Croatia) Nino Serdarušić
- Runners-up: (United Kingdom) Finn Bass (Netherlands) Jarno Jans
- Score: 6–4, 3–6, [13–11]

Events
Singles	Doubles
- Platzmann Open

Hendrik Jebens and Albano Olivetti were the defending champions but chose not to defend their title.

Admir Kalender and Nino Serdarušić won the title after defeating Finn Bass and Jarno Jans 6–4, 3–6, [13–11] in the final.

== Seeds ==
1. (France) Arthur Reymond / (France) Luca Sanchez (first round)
2. (Serbia) Stefan Latinović / (Bolivia) Federico Zeballos (quarterfinals)
3. (Netherlands) Thijmen Loof / (Japan) Kaito Uesugi (quarterfinals)
4. (Romania) Alexandru Jecan / (Romania) Bogdan Pavel (quarterfinals)

== Draw ==
Key

- Q = Qualifier
- WC = Wild card
- LL = Lucky loser
- Alt = Alternate
- ITF = ITF entry
- PR = Protected ranking
- SR = Special ranking
- SE = Special exempt
- JE = Junior exempt
- JR = Junior Accelerator Programme entrant
- CO = College Accelerator Programme entrant
- NG = Next Gen Accelerator Program entrant
- w/o = Walkover
- r = Retired
- d = Defaulted

First round
1	(France) A Reymond (France) L Sanchez	6^{3}	6	[11]
(Bolivia) B Arias (Denmark) J Ingildsen	7^{7}	3	[13]
(Czech Republic) A Paulson (Belgium) J Vliegen	7^{7}	6
(India) VS Prashanth (India) R Ramanathan	6^{3}	4
4	(Romania) A Jecan (Romania) B Pavel	6	7^{9}
(Belgium) S Gillé (Ukraine) V Sachko	3	6^{7}
(United Kingdom) F Bass (Netherlands) J Jans	7^{7}	7^{7}
(Spain) S Martos Gornés (Poland) S Walków	6^{5}	6^{2}
(Croatia) A Kalender (Croatia) N Serdarušić	7^{7}	7^{8}
(Germany) T Rühl (Netherlands) M Veldheer	6^{2}	6^{6}
WC	(Latvia) Kristians Koldvells (Germany) Yannik Weissmann	4	4
3	(Netherlands) T Loof (Japan) K Uesugi	6	6
(Czech Republic) Z Kolář (Czech Republic) M Vocel	6	6
WC	(Germany) J Opitz (Netherlands) Fons van Sambeek	4	4
(Uruguay) I Carou (Argentina) FA Gómez	3	7	[15]
2	(Serbia) S Latinović (Bolivia) F Zeballos	6	5	[17]

Quarterfinals
(Bolivia) B Arias (Denmark) J Ingildsen	1	3
(Czech Republic) A Paulson (Belgium) J Vliegen	6	6
4	(Romania) A Jecan (Romania) B Pavel	1	1
(United Kingdom) F Bass (Netherlands) J Jans	6	6
(Croatia) A Kalender (Croatia) N Serdarušić	7^{7}	6
3	(Netherlands) T Loof (Japan) K Uesugi	6^{5}	4
(Czech Republic) Z Kolář (Czech Republic) M Vocel	7	6
2	(Serbia) S Latinović (Bolivia) F Zeballos	5	4

Semifinals
(Czech Republic) A Paulson (Belgium) J Vliegen	3	4
(United Kingdom) F Bass (Netherlands) J Jans	6	6
(Croatia) A Kalender (Croatia) N Serdarušić	6	4	[10]
(Czech Republic) Z Kolář (Czech Republic) M Vocel	4	6	[7]

Final
(United Kingdom) F Bass (Netherlands) J Jans	4	6	[11]
(Croatia) A Kalender (Croatia) N Serdarušić	6	3	[13]
