= 2021 Platzmann-Sauerland Open =

- Date: 16–22 August
- Edition: 1st
- Surface: Clay
- Location: Lüdenscheid, Germany

Champions

Singles
- (Germany) Daniel Altmaier

Doubles
- (Croatia) Ivan Sabanov / (Croatia) Matej Sabanov
Platzmann-Sauerland Open	· 2022 →

The 2021 Platzmann-Sauerland Open was a professional tennis tournament played on clay courts. It was the first edition of the tournament which was part of the 2021 ATP Challenger Tour. It took place in Lüdenscheid, Germany, between 16 and 22 August 2021.

== Singles main draw entrants ==
=== Seeds ===
Country	Player	Rank^{1}	Seed
ESP	Pablo Andújar	74	1
ESP	Pedro Martínez	76	2
ESP	Roberto Carballés Baena	96	3
GER	Daniel Altmaier	124	4
~~BOL~~	~~Hugo Dellien~~	~~142~~	~~5~~
ARG	Juan Manuel Cerúndolo	148	6
RUS	Roman Safiullin	162	7
NED	Robin Haase	226	8
FRA	Constant Lestienne	245	9

- ^{1} Rankings as of 9 August 2021.

=== Other entrants ===
The following players received wildcards into the singles main draw:

- (Japan) Shintaro Mochizuki
- (Germany) Rudolf Molleker
- (Germany) Marvin Möller

The following player received entry into the singles main draw using a protected ranking:

- (Belgium) Julien Cagnina

The following players received entry into the singles main draw as alternates:

- (Argentina) Nicolás Kicker
- (Netherlands) Jelle Sels

The following players received entry from the qualifying draw:

- (Spain) Javier Barranco Cosano
- (Romania) Filip Jianu
- (France) Matteo Martineau
- (Argentina) Genaro Alberto Olivieri

== Champions ==
=== Singles ===
- (Germany) Daniel Altmaier def. (Chile) Nicolás Jarry 7–6^{(7–1)}, 4–6, 6–3.

=== Doubles ===
- (Croatia) Ivan Sabanov / (Croatia) Matej Sabanov def. (Ukraine) Denys Molchanov / (Kazakhstan) Aleksandr Nedovyesov 6–4, 2–6, [12–10].
