= 2023 Platzmann-Sauerland Open – Doubles =

Doubles
- 2023 Platzmann-Sauerland Open

Final
- Champions: (Switzerland) Luca Margaroli (Argentina) Santiago Rodríguez Taverna
- Runners-up: (Germany) Jakob Schnaitter (Germany) Kai Wehnelt
- Score: 7–6^{(7–4)}, 6–4

Events
Singles	Doubles
- Platzmann-Sauerland Open

Robin Haase and Sem Verbeek were the defending champions but only Verbeek chose to defend his title, partnering Daniel Cukierman. Verbeek lost in the quarterfinals to Gabriel Roveri Sidney and Akira Santillan.

Luca Margaroli and Santiago Rodríguez Taverna won the title after defeating Jakob Schnaitter and Kai Wehnelt 7–6^{(7–4)}, 6–4 in the final.

== Seeds ==
1. (Netherlands) Sander Arends / (Germany) Constantin Frantzen (first round)
2. (Bolivia) Boris Arias / (Bolivia) Federico Zeballos (first round)
3. (Serbia) Ivan Sabanov / (Serbia) Matej Sabanov (first round)
4. (Spain) Pedro Martínez / (Spain) Oriol Roca Batalla (withdrew)

== Draw ==
Key

- Q = Qualifier
- WC = Wild card
- LL = Lucky loser
- Alt = Alternate
- ITF = ITF entry
- PR = Protected ranking
- SR = Special ranking
- SE = Special exempt
- JE = Junior exempt
- JR = Junior Accelerator Programme entrant
- CO = College Accelerator Programme entrant
- NG = Next Gen Accelerator Program entrant
- w/o = Walkover
- r = Retired
- d = Defaulted

First round
1	(Netherlands) S Arends (Germany) C Frantzen	4	5
(Israel) D Cukierman (Netherlands) S Verbeek	6	7
(France) G Blancaneaux (Germany) D Masur	2	6	[3]
(Brazil) Gabriel Roveri Sidney (Australia) A Santillan	6	2	[10]
Alt	(Brazil) Wilson Leite (Brazil) P Sakamoto	7	5	[4]
Alt	(Italy) Tommaso Compagnucci (Ukraine) G Kravchenko	5	7	[10]
(Switzerland) L Margaroli (Argentina) S Rodríguez Taverna	6	6
(Netherlands) M Hermans (Ukraine) V Orlov	2	3
(Peru) A Merino (Germany) C Negritu	w/o
WC	(Germany) Nick Mertgens (Brazil) J Pereira
(Germany) J Schnaitter (Germany) K Wehnelt	1	6	[10]
3	(Serbia) I Sabanov (Serbia) M Sabanov	6	1	[8]
WC	(Germany) Karlo Cubelic (Germany) Moritz Pieper	5	1
(Brazil) F Romboli (Brazil) M Zormann	7	6
(Sweden) F Bergevi (Netherlands) M Veldheer	7^{7}	6
2	(Bolivia) B Arias (Bolivia) F Zeballos	6^{2}	3

Quarterfinals
(Israel) D Cukierman (Netherlands) S Verbeek	3	6	[7]
(Brazil) G Roveri Sidney (Australia) A Santillan	6	1	[10]
Alt	(Italy) T Compagnucci (Ukraine) G Kravchenko	3	6	[5]
(Switzerland) L Margaroli (Argentina) S Rodríguez Taverna	6	3	[10]
(Peru) A Merino (Germany) C Negritu	2	1
(Germany) J Schnaitter (Germany) K Wehnelt	6	6
(Brazil) F Romboli (Brazil) M Zormann	2	6^{0}
(Sweden) F Bergevi (Netherlands) M Veldheer	6	7^{7}

Semifinals
(Brazil) G Roveri Sidney (Australia) A Santillan	6	3	[8]
(Switzerland) L Margaroli (Argentina) S Rodríguez Taverna	4	6	[10]
(Germany) J Schnaitter (Germany) K Wehnelt	3	7^{7}	[10]
(Sweden) F Bergevi (Netherlands) M Veldheer	6	6^{2}	[5]

Final
(Switzerland) L Margaroli (Argentina) S Rodríguez Taverna	7^{7}	6
(Germany) J Schnaitter (Germany) K Wehnelt	6^{4}	4
