= 2023 Platzmann-Sauerland Open – Singles =

Singles
- 2023 Platzmann-Sauerland Open

Final
- Champion: (Croatia) Duje Ajduković
- Runner-up: (Bolivia) Hugo Dellien
- Score: 7–5, 6–4

Events
Singles	Doubles
- Platzmann-Sauerland Open

Hamad Medjedovic was the defending champion but chose not to defend his title.

Duje Ajduković won the title after defeating Hugo Dellien 7–5, 6–4 in the final.

== Seeds ==
1. (Hungary) Fábián Marozsán (second round)
2. (Spain) Pedro Martínez (quarterfinals)
3. (France) Benoît Paire (semifinals)
4. (Kazakhstan) Timofey Skatov (second round)
5. (Germany) Maximilian Marterer (first round)
6. (Italy) Raúl Brancaccio (semifinals, retired)
7. (United Kingdom) Jan Choinski (first round)
8. (Bolivia) Hugo Dellien (final)

== Draw ==
Key

- Q = Qualifier
- WC = Wild card
- LL = Lucky loser
- Alt = Alternate
- ITF = ITF entry
- PR = Protected ranking
- SR = Special ranking
- SE = Special exempt
- JE = Junior exempt
- JR = Junior Accelerator Programme entrant
- CO = College Accelerator Programme entrant
- NG = Next Gen Accelerator Program entrant
- w/o = Walkover
- r = Retired
- d = Defaulted

=== Finals ===
Semifinals
Q	(Croatia) Duje Ajduković	6	2
6	(Italy) Raúl Brancaccio	3	1^{r}
3	(France) Benoît Paire	7^{7}	4	3
8	(Bolivia) Hugo Dellien	6^{4}	6	6

Final
Q	(Croatia) Duje Ajduković	7	6
8	(Bolivia) Hugo Dellien	5	4

=== Top half ===
First round
1	(Hungary) F Marozsán	7^{7}	6
WC	(Germany) Liam Gavrielides	6^{4}	3
WC	(Germany) MH Rehberg	4	2
(Germany) R Molleker	6	6
(Spain) O Roca Batalla	6	6
Q	(Italy) Tommaso Compagnucci	3	4
Q	(Croatia) D Ajduković	6	1	7^{7}
5	(Germany) M Marterer	3	6	6^{5}
4	(Kazakhstan) T Skatov	6	6^{5}	7
(Ukraine) O Krutykh	3	7^{7}	5
(France) G Blancaneaux	4	1
(Argentina) C Ugo Carabelli	6	6
(Italy) S Travaglia	6^{3}	0^{r}
Alt	(Germany) H Squire	7^{7}	1
(Switzerland) H Laaksonen	4	6	6^{3}
6	(Italy) R Brancaccio	6	3	7^{7}

Second round
1	(Hungary) F Marozsán	6	6^{3}	2
(Germany) R Molleker	0	7^{7}	6
(Spain) O Roca Batalla	4	4
Q	(Croatia) D Ajduković	6	6
4	(Kazakhstan) T Skatov	3	7	6^{5}
(Argentina) C Ugo Carabelli	6	5	7^{7}
Alt	(Germany) H Squire	3	6	4
6	(Italy) R Brancaccio	6	2	6

Quarterfinals
(Germany) R Molleker	2	4
Q	(Croatia) D Ajduković	6	6
(Argentina) C Ugo Carabelli	4	6	4
6	(Italy) R Brancaccio	6	3	6

Semifinals
Q	(Croatia) D Ajduković	6	2
6	(Italy) R Brancaccio	3	1^{r}

=== Bottom half ===
First round
7	(United Kingdom) J Choinski	4	2
(Belgium) G Onclin	6	6
(Argentina) S Rodríguez Taverna	6	6
Q	(Ukraine) G Kravchenko	3	2
Q	(Germany) M Möller	6	6
(Dominican Republic) N Hardt	3	1
(Argentina) F Mena	4	3
3	(France) B Paire	6	6
8	(Bolivia) H Dellien	6	6
(Germany) D Masur	2	3
(Slovakia) J Kovalík	7^{9}	6
Q	(Syria) H Naw	6^{7}	3
WC	(Germany) L Wessels	6	7^{9}
Q	(Brazil) M Zormann	3	6^{7}
(Argentina) M Navone	5	6	6^{2}
2	(Spain) P Martínez	7	2	7^{7}

Second round
(Belgium) G Onclin	6	6
(Argentina) S Rodríguez Taverna	1	4
Q	(Germany) M Möller	4	4
3	(France) B Paire	6	6
8	(Bolivia) H Dellien	1	6	7^{7}
(Slovakia) J Kovalík	6	1	6^{3}
WC	(Germany) L Wessels	4	2
2	(Spain) P Martínez	6	6

Quarterfinals
(Belgium) G Onclin	4	4
3	(France) B Paire	6	6
8	(Bolivia) H Dellien	7	7
2	(Spain) P Martínez	5	5

Semifinals
3	(France) B Paire	7^{7}	4	3
8	(Bolivia) H Dellien	6^{4}	6	6
