= 2025 Platzmann Open – Doubles =

Doubles
- 2025 Platzmann Open

Final
- Champions: (Germany) Hendrik Jebens (France) Albano Olivetti
- Runners-up: (United States) Vasil Kirkov (Netherlands) Bart Stevens
- Score: 6–4, 6–7^{(2–7)}, [10–8]

Events
Singles	Doubles
- Platzmann Open

David Pel and Bart Stevens were the defending champions but only Stevens chose to defend his title, partnering Vasil Kirkov. They lost in the final to Hendrik Jebens and Albano Olivetti.

Jebens and Olivetti won the title after defeating Kirkov and Stevens 6–4, 6–7^{(2–7)}, [10–8] in the final.

== Seeds ==
1. (Germany) Hendrik Jebens / (France) Albano Olivetti (champions)
2. (United States) Vasil Kirkov / (Netherlands) Bart Stevens (final)
3. (Peru) Alexander Merino / (Germany) Christoph Negritu (first round)
4. (Venezuela) Luis David Martínez / (Bolivia) Federico Zeballos (first round)

== Draw ==
Key

- Q = Qualifier
- WC = Wild card
- LL = Lucky loser
- Alt = Alternate
- ITF = ITF entry
- PR = Protected ranking
- SR = Special ranking
- SE = Special exempt
- JE = Junior exempt
- JR = Junior Accelerator Programme entrant
- CO = College Accelerator Programme entrant
- NG = Next Gen Accelerator Program entrant
- w/o = Walkover
- r = Retired
- d = Defaulted

=== Draw ===
First round
1	(Germany) H Jebens (France) A Olivetti	6	6
(Netherlands) M Hermans (Italy) F Romano	3	4
(Serbia) I Sabanov (Serbia) M Sabanov	6	3	[10]
(Spain) M Mansilla Díez (Spain) B Pujol Navarro	3	6	[5]
3	(Peru) A Merino (Germany) C Negritu	4	7^{7}	[6]
(India) S Banthia (Bulgaria) A Donski	6	6^{0}	[10]
WC	(Netherlands) S Klaassen (Netherlands) Fons van Sambeek	3	4
(Sweden) E Grevelius (Serbia) S Latinović	6	6
(Japan) K Uesugi (Japan) S Watanabe	3	4
(Kazakhstan) D Popko (Brazil) JL Reis da Silva	6	6
WC	(Germany) D Masur (Germany) B Sanchez Martinez	4	6	[10]
4	(Venezuela) LD Martínez (Bolivia) F Zeballos	6	3	[7]
(Austria) N Oberleitner (Netherlands) M Veldheer	6	6
(Argentina) M Kestelboim (Argentina) G Villanueva	4	4
(Romania) V Cornea (Spain) S Martos Gornés	2	6	[2]
2	(United States) V Kirkov (Netherlands) B Stevens	6	3	[10]

Quarterfinals
1	(Germany) H Jebens (France) A Olivetti	7^{7}	7^{7}
(Serbia) I Sabanov (Serbia) M Sabanov	6^{3}	6^{4}
(India) S Banthia (Bulgaria) A Donski	3	4
(Sweden) E Grevelius (Serbia) S Latinović	6	6
(Kazakhstan) D Popko (Brazil) JL Reis da Silva	4	2
WC	(Germany) D Masur (Germany) B Sanchez Martinez	6	6
(Austria) N Oberleitner (Netherlands) M Veldheer	4	4
2	(United States) V Kirkov (Netherlands) B Stevens	6	6

Semifinals
1	(Germany) H Jebens (France) A Olivetti	7^{7}	6^{5}	[10]
(Sweden) E Grevelius (Serbia) S Latinović	6^{1}	7^{7}	[7]
WC	(Germany) D Masur (Germany) B Sanchez Martinez	0	6	[7]
2	(United States) V Kirkov (Netherlands) B Stevens	6	4	[10]

Final
1	(Germany) H Jebens (France) A Olivetti	6	6^{2}	[10]
2	(United States) V Kirkov (Netherlands) B Stevens	4	7^{7}	[8]
