= 2024 Platzmann-Sauerland Open – Singles =

Singles
- 2024 Platzmann-Sauerland Open

Final
- Champion: (Belgium) Raphaël Collignon
- Runner-up: (Netherlands) Botic van de Zandschulp
- Score: 3–6, 6–4, 6–3

Events
Singles	Doubles
- Platzmann-Sauerland Open

Duje Ajduković was the defending champion but chose not to defend his title.

Raphaël Collignon won the title after defeating Botic van de Zandschulp 3–6, 6–4, 6–3 in the final.

== Seeds ==
1. (Netherlands) Botic van de Zandschulp (final)
2. (Argentina) Marco Trungelliti (second round)
3. (Argentina) Román Andrés Burruchaga (quarterfinals)
4. (France) Titouan Droguet (semifinals, retired)
5. (Spain) Oriol Roca Batalla (quarterfinals)
6. (Austria) Jurij Rodionov (first round)
7. (Germany) Henri Squire (quarterfinals)
8. (Poland) Kamil Majchrzak (semifinals)

== Draw ==
Key

- Q = Qualifier
- WC = Wild card
- LL = Lucky loser
- Alt = Alternate
- ITF = ITF entry
- PR = Protected ranking
- SR = Special ranking
- SE = Special exempt
- JE = Junior exempt
- JR = Junior Accelerator Programme entrant
- CO = College Accelerator Programme entrant
- NG = Next Gen Accelerator Program entrant
- w/o = Walkover
- r = Retired
- d = Defaulted

=== Finals ===
Semifinals
1	(Netherlands) Botic van de Zandschulp	3
4	(France) Titouan Droguet	1^{r}
8	(Poland) Kamil Majchrzak	1	3
Alt	(Belgium) Raphaël Collignon	6	6

Final
1	(Netherlands) Botic van de Zandschulp	6	4	3
Alt	(Belgium) Raphaël Collignon	3	6	6

=== Top half ===
First round
1	(Netherlands) B van de Zandschulp	6	6
(Germany) R Molleker	3	4
Alt	(South Korea) G Campaña Lee	7^{7}	7^{7}
(Spain) J Barranco Cosano	6^{5}	6^{5}
Q	(Poland) Olaf Pieczkowski	3	4
Q	(Germany) M Topo	6	6
(United Kingdom) J Choinski	2	2
7	(Germany) H Squire	6	6
4	(France) T Droguet	7^{7}	6
Q	(Germany) Marlon Vankan	6^{4}	2
Q	(Bosnia and Herzegovina) M Bašić	4	2
(Spain) M Landaluce	6	6
(Spain) B Zapata Miralles	1	5
(Belgium) G Onclin	6	7
Q	(Brazil) Nicolas Zanellato	3	2
5	(Spain) O Roca Batalla	6	6

Second round
1	(Netherlands) B van de Zandschulp	6	3	6
Alt	(South Korea) G Campaña Lee	1	6	4
Q	(Germany) M Topo	6	3	5
7	(Germany) H Squire	3	6	7
4	(France) T Droguet	7	7^{7}
(Spain) M Landaluce	5	6^{3}
(Belgium) G Onclin	6^{2}	7	4
5	(Spain) O Roca Batalla	7^{7}	5	6

Quarterfinals
1	(Netherlands) B van de Zandschulp	3	7	7
7	(Germany) H Squire	6	5	5
4	(France) T Droguet	6	6
5	(Spain) O Roca Batalla	3	2

Semifinals
1	(Netherlands) B van de Zandschulp	3
4	(France) T Droguet	1^{r}

=== Bottom half ===
First round
8	(Poland) K Majchrzak	7^{7}	7^{8}
(Argentina) F Mena	6^{5}	6^{6}
(France) C Hemery	6	0
(Italy) F Agamenone	4	0^{r}
(France) T Lamasine	3	3
(Peru) I Buse	6	6
Q	(Spain) M Alcalá Gurri	0	7^{7}	1
3	(Argentina) RA Burruchaga	6	6^{5}	6
6	(Austria) J Rodionov	6	4	0
(Italy) S Travaglia	4	6	6
(France) C Tabur	6^{5}	6	6
WC	(Germany) M Schönhaus	7^{7}	0	4
WC	(Germany) D Dedura-Palomero	4	4
Alt	(Belgium) R Collignon	6	6
WC	(Germany) J Engel	6	4	6^{6}
2	(Argentina) M Trungelliti	2	6	7^{8}

Second round
8	(Poland) K Majchrzak	6	6
(France) C Hemery	1	3
(Peru) I Buse	5	3
3	(Argentina) RA Burruchaga	7	6
(Italy) S Travaglia	7	2	1
(France) C Tabur	5	6	6
Alt	(Belgium) R Collignon	6	6
2	(Argentina) M Trungelliti	4	4

Quarterfinals
8	(Poland) K Majchrzak	6	6
3	(Argentina) RA Burruchaga	1	3
(France) C Tabur	4	6	4
Alt	(Belgium) R Collignon	6	4	6

Semifinals
8	(Poland) K Majchrzak	1	3
Alt	(Belgium) R Collignon	6	6
