= 2026 Dutch Open =

- Date: 13 – 19 July
- Surface: Clay
- Location: Bunschoten, Netherlands

Champions

Singles
- (Netherlands) Guy den Ouden

Doubles
- (Czech Republic) Andrew Paulson / (Belgium) Joran Vliegen
- Dutch Open

The 2026 Dutch Open was a professional tennis tournament played on clay courts. It was the seventh edition of the Challenger tournament which was part of the 2026 ATP Challenger Tour. It took place in Bunschoten, Netherlands between 13 and 19 July 2026.

== Singles main draw entrants ==
=== Seeds ===
Country	Player	Rank^{1}	Seed
CHI	Tomás Barrios Vera	137	1
BEL	Gauthier Onclin	178	2
ESP	David Jordà Sanchis	184	3
BEL	Gilles-Arnaud Bailly	210	4
GER	Tom Gentzsch	216	5
BEL	Kimmer Coppejans	222	6
GER	Henri Squire	235	7
BRA	João Lucas Reis da Silva	236	8

- ^{1} Rankings are as of 29 June 2026.

=== Other entrants ===
The following players received wildcards into the singles main draw:

- (Netherlands) Thijs Boogaard
- (Netherlands) Pieter de Lange
- (Netherlands) Niels Visker

The following player received entry into the singles main draw through the Junior Accelerator programme:

- (Spain) Andrés Santamarta Roig

The following player received entry into the singles main draw as a special exempt:

- (Germany) Florian Broska

The following player received entry into the singles main draw as an alternate:

- (Switzerland) Mika Brunold

The following players received entry from the qualifying draw:

- (South Korea) Gerard Campaña Lee
- (Netherlands) Abel Forger
- (Czech Republic) Jan Kumstát
- (Netherlands) Ryan Nijboer
- (Germany) Mika Petkovic
- (Germany) Louis Wessels

The following player received entry as a lucky loser:

- (Kazakhstan) Denis Yevseyev

== Champions ==
=== Singles ===
- (Netherlands) Guy den Ouden def. (Germany) Tom Gentzsch 6–4, 4–6, 6–0.

=== Doubles ===
- (Czech Republic) Andrew Paulson / (Belgium) Joran Vliegen def. (Romania) Victor Vlad Cornea / (Israel) Daniel Cukierman 7–6^{(7–5)}, 6–2.
