= 2026 French Open – Men's singles qualifying =

Men's singles qualifying
- 2026 French Open

Events
Singles	men	women		boys	girls
Doubles	men	women	mixed	boys	girls
WC Singles	men	women	quad	boys	girls
WC Doubles	men	women	quad	boys	girls

Qualification
Singles	men	women
- French Open

The 2026 French Open – Men's singles qualifying was a series of tennis matches that took place from 18 to 23 May 2026 to determine the sixteen qualifiers into the main draw of the men's singles tournament.

Only 16 out of the 128 qualifiers who compete in this knock-out tournament, secure a main draw place.

This marked the first time 2017 ATP Finals champion Grigor Dimitrov contested a major qualifying competition since the 2011 Australian Open. He lost in the first round to Jaime Faria.

== Seeds ==
All seeds are per ATP rankings as of 4 May 2026.

1. (Netherlands) Jesper de Jong (qualifying competition, lucky loser)
2. (Japan) Sho Shimabukuro (first round)
3. (United States) Emilio Nava (qualified)
4. (Hong Kong) Coleman Wong (qualifying competition, lucky loser)
5. (Italy) Francesco Maestrelli (second round)
6. (Slovakia) Alex Molčan (second round)
7. (United States) Martin Damm (first round)
8. (Czech Republic) Dalibor Svrčina (qualifying competition)
9. (Georgia (country)) Nikoloz Basilashvili (first round)
10. (Portugal) Jaime Faria (qualified)
11. (Portugal) Henrique Rocha (second round)
12. (Lithuania) Vilius Gaubas (qualifying competition, lucky loser)
13. (United Kingdom) Jan Choinski (second round, withdrew)
14. (Norway) Nicolai Budkov Kjær (second round)
15. (Australia) Tristan Schoolkate (second round)
16. (Finland) Otto Virtanen (first round)
17. (Switzerland) Leandro Riedi (qualifying competition)
18. (United States) Mackenzie McDonald (first round)
19. (Japan) Shintaro Mochizuki (first round)
20. (Serbia) Dušan Lajović (first round)
21. (Bolivia) Hugo Dellien (qualified)
22. (Chile) Tomás Barrios Vera (second round)
23. (Australia) Dane Sweeny (first round)
24. (Spain) Pedro Martínez (qualifying competition)
25. (United Kingdom) Jack Pinnington Jones (first round)
26. (Australia) Alex Bolt (first round)
27. (Spain) Pablo Llamas Ruiz (qualified)
28. (Tunisia) Moez Echargui (first round)
29. (Italy) Stefano Travaglia (second round)
30. Roman Safiullin (qualified)
31. (South Africa) Lloyd Harris (second round)
32. (France) Kyrian Jacquet (qualified)

== Qualifiers ==
1. (United States) Michael Zheng
2. (Italy) Andrea Pellegrino
3. (United States) Emilio Nava
4. (Bolivia) Juan Carlos Prado Ángelo
5. (Bolivia) Hugo Dellien
6. (France) Kyrian Jacquet
7. (United Kingdom) Toby Samuel
8. (France) Thomas Faurel
9. (Italy) Federico Cinà
10. (Portugal) Jaime Faria
11. (Austria) Jurij Rodionov
12. (Spain) Pablo Llamas Ruiz
13. (France) Pierre-Hugues Herbert
14. Roman Safiullin
15. (France) Luka Pavlovic
16. (Argentina) Facundo Díaz Acosta

== Lucky losers ==
1. (Hong Kong) Coleman Wong
2. (Netherlands) Jesper de Jong
3. (Lithuania) Vilius Gaubas

== Draw ==
Key

- Q = Qualifier
- WC = Wild card
- LL = Lucky loser
- Alt = Alternate
- ITF = ITF entry
- PR = Protected ranking
- SR = Special ranking
- SE = Special exempt
- JE = Junior exempt
- JR = Junior Accelerator Programme entrant
- CO = College Accelerator Programme entrant
- NG = Next Gen Accelerator Program entrant
- w/o = Walkover
- r = Retired
- d = Defaulted

=== First qualifier ===
First round
1	(Netherlands) Jesper de Jong	7^{7}	7^{7}
(China) Sun Fajing	6^{4}	6^{5}
Ilia Simakin	4	7^{8}	2
(Canada) Liam Draxl	6	6^{6}	6
WC	(France) Antoine Ghibaudo	4	2
(United States) Michael Zheng	6	6
(Argentina) Juan Pablo Ficovich	3	7^{7}	5
29	(Italy) Stefano Travaglia	6	6^{2}	7

Second round
1	(Netherlands) Jesper de Jong	4	6	6
(Canada) Liam Draxl	6	1	3
(United States) Michael Zheng	7	7
29	(Italy) Stefano Travaglia	5	5

Qualifying competition
1	(Netherlands) Jesper de Jong	5	3
(United States) Michael Zheng	7	6

=== Second qualifier ===
First round
2	(Japan) Sho Shimabukuro	6	4	5
(Greece) Stefanos Sakellaridis	2	6	7
(Netherlands) Max Houkes	6^{5}	2
(Italy) Marco Cecchinato	7^{7}	6
(Italy) Andrea Pellegrino	6	7
PR	(United States) Nicolas Moreno de Alboran	2	5
(France) Hugo Grenier	3	3
31	(South Africa) Lloyd Harris	6	6

Second round
(Greece) Stefanos Sakellaridis	3	6^{2}
(Italy) Marco Cecchinato	6	7^{7}
(Italy) Andrea Pellegrino	3	6	6
31	(South Africa) Lloyd Harris	6	0	3

Qualifying competition
(Italy) Marco Cecchinato	6^{5}	2
(Italy) Andrea Pellegrino	7^{7}	6

=== Third qualifier ===
First round
3	(United States) Emilio Nava	7^{7}	7^{7}
(China) Bu Yunchaokete	6^{4}	6^{3}
(Brazil) Thiago Seyboth Wild	6	6
(Chinese Taipei) Hsu Yu-hsiou	1	3
(Sweden) Elias Ymer	2	5
(United Kingdom) Arthur Fery	6	7
(Japan) Rei Sakamoto	2	5
24	(Spain) Pedro Martínez	6	7

Second round
3	(United States) Emilio Nava	6	6
(Brazil) Thiago Seyboth Wild	2	3
(United Kingdom) Arthur Fery	6^{3}	6	3
24	(Spain) Pedro Martínez	7^{7}	4	6

Qualifying competition
3	(United States) Emilio Nava	6	6
24	(Spain) Pedro Martínez	3	3

=== Fourth qualifier ===
First round
4	(Hong Kong) Coleman Wong	6	4	7^{10}
(United Kingdom) Billy Harris	2	6	6^{7}
(Australia) James McCabe	3	6^{1}
(Czech Republic) Zdeněk Kolář	6	7^{7}
WC	(France) Robin Bertrand	2	4
(Estonia) Daniil Glinka	6	6
(Bolivia) Juan Carlos Prado Ángelo	6	7^{9}
18	(United States) Mackenzie McDonald	4	6^{7}

Second round
4	(Hong Kong) Coleman Wong	7	2	6
(Czech Republic) Zdeněk Kolář	5	6	1
(Estonia) Daniil Glinka	3	4
(Bolivia) Juan Carlos Prado Ángelo	6	6

Qualifying competition
4	(Hong Kong) Coleman Wong	4	6	3
(Bolivia) Juan Carlos Prado Ángelo	6	3	6

=== Fifth qualifier ===
First round
5	(Italy) Francesco Maestrelli	3	7^{7}	6
(Japan) Rio Noguchi	6	6^{4}	2
(Argentina) Lautaro Midón	4	6^{0}
(Spain) Roberto Carballés Baena	6	7^{7}
(Croatia) Matej Dodig	1	6	7
(China) Zhou Yi	6	3	5
WC	(France) Sean Cuenin	4	4
21	(Bolivia) Hugo Dellien	6	6

Second round
5	(Italy) Francesco Maestrelli	6	3	3
(Spain) Roberto Carballés Baena	2	6	6
(Croatia) Matej Dodig	1	4
21	(Bolivia) Hugo Dellien	6	6

Qualifying competition
(Spain) Roberto Carballés Baena	3	6	1
21	(Bolivia) Hugo Dellien	6	3	6

=== Sixth qualifier ===
First round
6	(Slovakia) Alex Molčan	1	6	6
(United Kingdom) Oliver Crawford	6	4	1
PR	(Tunisia) Aziz Dougaz	3	6	4
(United Kingdom) Felix Gill	6	1	6
(Bosnia and Herzegovina) Nerman Fatić	6	6
(Croatia) Luka Mikrut	4	4
(Italy) Lorenzo Giustino	3	6^{4}
32	(France) Kyrian Jacquet	6	7^{7}

Second round
6	(Slovakia) Alex Molčan	6	5	6^{9}
(United Kingdom) Felix Gill	2	7	7^{11}
(Bosnia and Herzegovina) Nerman Fatić	6	3	6^{8}
32	(France) Kyrian Jacquet	2	6	7^{10}

Qualifying competition
(United Kingdom) Felix Gill	6^{5}	3
32	(France) Kyrian Jacquet	7^{7}	6

=== Seventh qualifier ===
First round
7	(United States) Martin Damm	6^{11}	2
(United Kingdom) Toby Samuel	7^{13}	6
WC	(Belgium) David Goffin	6	6
(Chinese Taipei) Tseng Chun-hsin	3	1
(Peru) Gonzalo Bueno	6	7^{7}
WC	(France) Florent Bax	0	6^{2}
(Ukraine) Vitaliy Sachko	3	7^{7}	7
25	(United Kingdom) Jack Pinnington Jones	6	6^{5}	5

Second round
(United Kingdom) Toby Samuel	5	6	6
WC	(Belgium) David Goffin	7	3	3
(Peru) Gonzalo Bueno	6	6
(Ukraine) Vitaliy Sachko	2	4

Qualifying competition
(United Kingdom) Toby Samuel	5	6	6
(Peru) Gonzalo Bueno	7	1	3

=== Eighth qualifier ===
First round
8	(Czech Republic) Dalibor Svrčina	6^{3}	6	6
(Netherlands) Guy den Ouden	7^{7}	3	2
(Portugal) Frederico Ferreira Silva	3	7^{7}	3
(Argentina) Federico Agustín Gómez	6	6^{5}	6
(Argentina) Genaro Alberto Olivieri	6^{1}	3
WC	(France) Thomas Faurel	7^{7}	6
(United Kingdom) Jay Clarke	6	6
23	(Australia) Dane Sweeny	2	2

Second round
8	(Czech Republic) Dalibor Svrčina	7^{7}	6
(Argentina) Federico Agustín Gómez	6^{3}	2
WC	(France) Thomas Faurel	6	6
(United Kingdom) Jay Clarke	4	3

Qualifying competition
8	(Czech Republic) Dalibor Svrčina	2	3
WC	(France) Thomas Faurel	6	6

=== Ninth qualifier ===
First round
9	(Georgia (country)) Nikoloz Basilashvili	6^{4}	4
(Brazil) Pedro Boscardin Dias	7^{7}	6
(Argentina) Alex Barrena	6	3	6^{7}
(Canada) Alexis Galarneau	2	6	7^{10}
(Italy) Federico Cinà	6	6
(Japan) Yosuke Watanuki	4	4
(Australia) Bernard Tomic	3	7	6
28	(Tunisia) Moez Echargui	6	5	3

Second round
(Brazil) Pedro Boscardin Dias	6	3	4
(Canada) Alexis Galarneau	4	6	6
(Italy) Federico Cinà	6	6
(Australia) Bernard Tomic	2	4

Qualifying competition
(Canada) Alexis Galarneau	7	2	5
(Italy) Federico Cinà	5	6	7

=== Tenth qualifier ===
First round
10	(Portugal) Jaime Faria	3	7	7^{10}
(Bulgaria) Grigor Dimitrov	6	5	6^{6}
(United States) Colton Smith	7	6
(Ecuador) Álvaro Guillén Meza	5	1
(Spain) Alejandro Moro Cañas	4	7^{7}	6
(Italy) Stefano Napolitano	6	6^{4}	0
(Austria) Lukas Neumayer	6	6
26	(Australia) Alex Bolt	0	1

Second round
10	(Portugal) Jaime Faria	6	3	6
(United States) Colton Smith	1	6	3
(Spain) Alejandro Moro Cañas	1	3
(Austria) Lukas Neumayer	6	6

Qualifying competition
10	(Portugal) Jaime Faria	6	7^{11}
(Austria) Lukas Neumayer	3	6^{9}

=== Eleventh qualifier ===
First round
11	(Portugal) Henrique Rocha	6	7^{7}
(Hungary) Zsombor Piros	4	6^{4}
(Croatia) Borna Gojo	6	6
WC	(France) Sascha Gueymard Wayenburg	3	4
(Brazil) Gustavo Heide	6	6
(France) Dan Added	3	0
(Austria) Jurij Rodionov	6	7
20	(Serbia) Dušan Lajović	2	5

Second round
11	(Portugal) Henrique Rocha	3	6	6^{9}
(Croatia) Borna Gojo	6	3	7^{11}
(Brazil) Gustavo Heide	1	4
(Austria) Jurij Rodionov	6	6

Qualifying competition
(Croatia) Borna Gojo	5	3
(Austria) Jurij Rodionov	7	6

=== Twelfth qualifier ===
First round
12	(Lithuania) Vilius Gaubas	6	6
PR	(Argentina) Federico Coria	4	1
(Brazil) João Lucas Reis da Silva	6	6
WC	(France) Calvin Hemery	4	4
(United Kingdom) Charles Broom	6	6^{9}	4
(France) Ugo Blanchet	4	7^{11}	6
(Colombia) Nicolás Mejía	3	6^{7}
27	(Spain) Pablo Llamas Ruiz	6	7^{9}

Second round
12	(Lithuania) Vilius Gaubas	4	6	6
(Brazil) João Lucas Reis da Silva	6	3	4
(France) Ugo Blanchet	4	2
27	(Spain) Pablo Llamas Ruiz	6	6

Qualifying competition
12	(Lithuania) Vilius Gaubas	3	1
27	(Spain) Pablo Llamas Ruiz	6	6

=== Thirteenth qualifier ===
First round
13	(United Kingdom) Jan Choinski	7^{7}	6
(Ecuador) Andy Andrade	6^{4}	4
(France) Pierre-Hugues Herbert	6	6
(Japan) Kaichi Uchida	4	4
(United Kingdom) Liam Broady	5	4
(Italy) Gianluca Cadenasso	7	6
(Luxembourg) Chris Rodesch	2	6^{4}
17	(Switzerland) Leandro Riedi	6	7^{7}

Second round
13	(United Kingdom) Jan Choinski
(France) Pierre-Hugues Herbert	w/o
(Italy) Gianluca Cadenasso	7^{7}	4	5
17	(Switzerland) Leandro Riedi	6^{5}	6	7

Qualifying competition
(France) Pierre-Hugues Herbert	6	6^{8}	6
17	(Switzerland) Leandro Riedi	4	7^{10}	3

=== Fourteenth qualifier ===
First round
14	(Norway) Nicolai Budkov Kjær	2	6	6
(Belgium) Gilles Arnaud Bailly	6	4	2
(Switzerland) Jérôme Kym	2	3
(Germany) Tom Gentzsch	6	6
(Austria) Joel Schwärzler	6	7
(France) Clément Chidekh	1	5
(Estonia) Mark Lajal	4	4
30	Roman Safiullin	6	6

Second round
14	(Norway) Nicolai Budkov Kjær	6^{2}	2
(Germany) Tom Gentzsch	7^{7}	6
(Austria) Joel Schwärzler	4	4
30	Roman Safiullin	6	6

Qualifying competition
(Germany) Tom Gentzsch	3	7^{7}	4
30	Roman Safiullin	6	6^{2}	6

=== Fifteenth qualifier ===
First round
15	(Australia) Tristan Schoolkate	7	1	6
(Belgium) Kimmer Coppejans	5	6	4
Alt	(United States) Darwin Blanch	6	6
(Kazakhstan) Timofey Skatov	1	2
(France) Luka Pavlovic	3	7^{7}	6
(United Kingdom) Harry Wendelken	6	6^{1}	2
(France) Harold Mayot	4	6	3
22	(Chile) Tomás Barrios Vera	6	1	6

Second round
15	(Australia) Tristan Schoolkate	4	4
Alt	(United States) Darwin Blanch	6	6
(France) Luka Pavlovic	6	6^{5}	6
22	(Chile) Tomás Barrios Vera	2	7^{7}	2

Qualifying competition
Alt	(United States) Darwin Blanch	2	4
(France) Luka Pavlovic	6	6

=== Sixteenth qualifier ===
First round
16	(Finland) Otto Virtanen	6^{8}	2
(Denmark) August Holmgren	7^{10}	6
(United Kingdom) Dan Evans	4	4
WC	(France) Daniel Jade	6	6
(Argentina) Facundo Díaz Acosta	7^{9}	4	6
(Australia) Christopher O'Connell	6^{7}	6	4
(Switzerland) Rémy Bertola	2	6	6
19	(Japan) Shintaro Mochizuki	6	3	0

Second round
(Denmark) August Holmgren	6	6
WC	(France) Daniel Jade	3	3
(Argentina) Facundo Díaz Acosta	6	6
(Switzerland) Rémy Bertola	4	3

Qualifying competition
(Denmark) August Holmgren	7^{7}	4	2
(Argentina) Facundo Díaz Acosta	6^{2}	6	6
