= 2025 Advantage Cars Prague Open =

Tennis tournament in the Czech Republic

- Date: 5–11 May
- Edition: 32nd (men); 20th (women)
- Category: ATP Challenger Tour; ITF Women's World Tennis Tour
- Surface: Clay / Outdoor
- Location: Prague, Czech Republic

Champions

Men's singles
- (Austria) Filip Misolic

Women's singles
- (United Kingdom) Francesca Jones

Men's doubles
- (Ukraine) Denys Molchanov / (Czech Republic) Matěj Vocel

Women's doubles
- (Netherlands) Jasmijn Gimbrère / (Czech Republic) Denisa Hindová
- Advantage Cars Prague Open

The 2025 Advantage Cars Prague Open was a professional tennis tournament played on outdoor clay courts. It was the 32nd (men) and 20th (women) editions of the tournament, which were part of the 2025 ATP Challenger Tour and the 2025 ITF Women's World Tennis Tour. It took place in Prague, Czech Republic, between 5 and 11 May 2025.

== Champions ==
=== Men's singles ===
- (Austria) Filip Misolic def. (Netherlands) Guy den Ouden 6–4, 6–0.

=== Women's singles ===
- (United Kingdom) Francesca Jones def. (Japan) Ena Shibahara 6–3, 6–4.

=== Men's doubles ===
- (Ukraine) Denys Molchanov / (Czech Republic) Matěj Vocel def. (Austria) David Pichler / (Austria) Jurij Rodionov 7–6^{(7–3)}, 6–3.

=== Women's doubles ===
- (Netherlands) Jasmijn Gimbrère / (Czech Republic) Denisa Hindová def. (Czech Republic) Aneta Kučmová / (Greece) Sapfo Sakellaridi 7–6^{(7–5)}, 7–5.

== Men's singles main draw entrants ==
=== Seeds ===
Country	Player	Rank^{1}	Seed
JPN	Shintaro Mochizuki	146	1
ESP	Martín Landaluce	148	2
BEL	Alexander Blockx	151	3
KAZ	Dmitry Popko	155	4
GEO	Nikoloz Basilashvili	157	5
ESP	Alejandro Moro Cañas	159	6
KAZ	Mikhail Kukushkin	162	7
IND	Sumit Nagal	165	8

- ^{1} Rankings are as of 21 April 2025.

=== Other entrants ===
The following players received wildcards into the singles main draw:

- (Czech Republic) Petr Brunclík
- (Czech Republic) Maxim Mrva
- (Netherlands) Mees Röttgering

The following player received entry into the singles main draw as a special exempt:

- (Hungary) ~~Zsombor Piros~~

The following player received entry into the singles main draw through the College Accelerator Programme:

- (France) Antoine Cornut-Chauvinc

The following player received entry into the singles main draw through the Junior Accelerator Programme:

- (Norway) Nicolai Budkov Kjær

The following player received entry into the singles main draw as an alternate:

- (Austria) Jurij Rodionov

The following players received entry from the qualifying draw:

- (Czech Republic) Hynek Bartoň
- (France) Maxime Chazal
- (Netherlands) Guy den Ouden
- (Czech Republic) Jan Kumstát
- (Spain) Daniel Rincón
- (Ukraine) Vitaliy Sachko

The following player received entry as a lucky loser:

- (France) Sascha Gueymard Wayenburg
