= 2022 Platzmann-Sauerland Open – Doubles =

Doubles
- 2022 Platzmann-Sauerland Open

Final
- Champions: (Netherlands) Robin Haase (Netherlands) Sem Verbeek
- Runners-up: (Germany) Fabian Fallert (Germany) Hendrik Jebens
- Score: 6–2, 5–7, [10–3]

Events
Singles	Doubles
- Platzmann-Sauerland Open

Ivan and Matej Sabanov were the defending champions but chose not to defend their title.

Robin Haase and Sem Verbeek won the title after defeating Fabian Fallert and Hendrik Jebens 6–2, 5–7, [10–3] in the final.

== Seeds ==
1. (France) Albano Olivetti / (Brazil) Fernando Romboli (quarterfinals)
2. (Netherlands) Robin Haase / (Netherlands) Sem Verbeek (champions)
3. (Netherlands) David Pel / (Netherlands) Bart Stevens (first round)
4. (Jamaica) Dustin Brown / (United States) Evan King (quarterfinals, withdrew)

== Draw ==
Key

- Q = Qualifier
- WC = Wild card
- LL = Lucky loser
- Alt = Alternate
- ITF = ITF entry
- PR = Protected ranking
- SR = Special ranking
- SE = Special exempt
- JE = Junior exempt
- JR = Junior Accelerator Programme entrant
- CO = College Accelerator Programme entrant
- NG = Next Gen Accelerator Program entrant
- w/o = Walkover
- r = Retired
- d = Defaulted

First round
1	(France) A Olivetti (Brazil) F Romboli	7^{7}	6
(Poland) P Matuszewski (Ukraine) V Sachko	6^{5}	1
B Bobrov (Kazakhstan) D Yevseyev	2	1
(Germany) F Fallert (Germany) H Jebens	6	6
3	(Netherlands) D Pel (Netherlands) B Stevens	6	2	[4]
(Switzerland) D Stricker (Switzerland) D Wenger	2	6	[10]
(Ukraine) G Kravchenko (Ukraine) O Krutykh	6	6
WC	(Germany) Dino Jablonski (Serbia) H Međedović	4	2
(Brazil) D Dutra da Silva (Peru) A Merino	6^{3}	6^{5}
(Uruguay) M Cuevas (Venezuela) LD Martínez	7^{7}	7^{7}
(Netherlands) M Hermans (Netherlands) G Smits	6^{3}	6^{2}
4	(Jamaica) D Brown (United States) E King	7^{7}	7^{7}
WC	(Germany) C Frantzen (Germany) T Sandkaulen	6	3	[8]
(Argentina) F Díaz Acosta (Argentina) S Rodríguez Taverna	4	6	[10]
(Bosnia and Herzegovina) A Šetkić (China) Zh Zhang	5	6	[6]
2	(Netherlands) R Haase (Netherlands) S Verbeek	7	2	[10]

Quarterfinals
1	(France) A Olivetti (Brazil) F Romboli	2	6	[4]
(Germany) F Fallert (Germany) H Jebens	6	3	[10]
(Switzerland) D Stricker (Switzerland) D Wenger	3	6	[10]
(Ukraine) G Kravchenko (Ukraine) O Krutykh	6	3	[8]
(Uruguay) M Cuevas (Venezuela) LD Martínez	w/o
4	(Jamaica) D Brown (United States) E King
(Argentina) F Díaz Acosta (Argentina) S Rodríguez Taverna	7	3	[4]
2	(Netherlands) R Haase (Netherlands) S Verbeek	5	6	[10]

Semifinals
(Germany) F Fallert (Germany) H Jebens	6	5	[10]
(Switzerland) D Stricker (Switzerland) D Wenger	2	7	[8]
(Uruguay) M Cuevas (Venezuela) LD Martínez	4	2
2	(Netherlands) R Haase (Netherlands) S Verbeek	6	6

Final
(Germany) F Fallert (Germany) H Jebens	2	7	[3]
2	(Netherlands) R Haase (Netherlands) S Verbeek	6	5	[10]
