= 2024 Open Quimper Bretagne – Doubles =

Doubles
- 2024 Open Quimper Bretagne

Final
- Champions: (France) Manuel Guinard (France) Arthur Rinderknech
- Runners-up: (India) Anirudh Chandrasekar (India) Vijay Sundar Prashanth
- Score: 7–6^{(7–4)}, 6–3

Events
Singles	Doubles
- Open Quimper Bretagne

Sadio Doumbia and Fabien Reboul were the defending champions but withdrew before their first round match.

Manuel Guinard and Arthur Rinderknech won the title after defeating Anirudh Chandrasekar and Vijay Sundar Prashanth 7–6^{(7–4)}, 6–3 in the final.

== Seeds ==
1. (France) Sadio Doumbia / (France) Fabien Reboul (withdrew)
2. (India) Anirudh Chandrasekar / (India) Vijay Sundar Prashanth (final)
3. (France) Théo Arribagé / (France) Luca Sanchez (first round)
4. (India) Arjun Kadhe / (India) Jeevan Nedunchezhiyan (semifinals, retired)

== Draw ==
Key

- Q = Qualifier
- WC = Wild card
- LL = Lucky loser
- Alt = Alternate
- ITF = ITF entry
- PR = Protected ranking
- SR = Special ranking
- SE = Special exempt
- JE = Junior exempt
- JR = Junior Accelerator Programme entrant
- CO = College Accelerator Programme entrant
- NG = Next Gen Accelerator Program entrant
- w/o = Walkover
- r = Retired
- d = Defaulted

First round
Alt	(Tunisia) A Dougaz (France) L Poullain
(United States) C Harrison (United Kingdom) M Willis	w/o
WC	(France) A Hoang (France) Cyril Vandermeersch	6	2	[2]
(Latvia) M Lībietis (Finland) P Niklas-Salminen	4	6	[10]
3	(France) T Arribagé (France) L Sanchez	6	3	[7]
(France) M Guinard (France) A Rinderknech	3	6	[10]
(Poland) P Matuszewski (Poland) S Walków	7^{7}	6
(United Kingdom) J Paris (Greece) Pe Tsitsipas	6^{2}	2
(United States) V Kirkov (Venezuela) LD Martínez	6	6^{3}	[8]
(France) U Blanchet (France) M Martineau	4	7^{7}	[10]
(Norway) V Durasovic (Finland) O Virtanen	6^{5}	4
4	(India) A Kadhe (India) J Nedunchezhiyan	7^{7}	6
(France) G Blancaneaux (France) C Hemery	6	6
WC	(France) M Bourgue (India) Sathi Reddy Chirala	1	2
(France) D Added (Poland) K Drzewiecki	3	6	[7]
2	(India) A Chandrasekar (India) VS Prashanth	6	3	[10]

Quarterfinals
(United States) C Harrison (United Kingdom) M Willis	6^{2}	6^{2}
(Latvia) M Lībietis (Finland) P Niklas-Salminen	7^{7}	7^{7}
(France) M Guinard (France) A Rinderknech	5	6	[10]
(Poland) P Matuszewski (Poland) S Walków	7	3	[4]
(France) U Blanchet (France) M Martineau	6	6^{6}	[8]
4	(India) A Kadhe (India) J Nedunchezhiyan	3	7^{8}	[10]
(France) G Blancaneaux (France) C Hemery	5	6	[3]
2	(India) A Chandrasekar (India) VS Prashanth	7	3	[10]

Semifinals
(Latvia) M Lībietis (Finland) P Niklas-Salminen	4	7^{7}	[12]
(France) M Guinard (France) A Rinderknech	6	6^{3}	[14]
4	(India) A Kadhe (India) J Nedunchezhiyan	2^{r}
2	(India) A Chandrasekar (India) VS Prashanth	5

Final
(France) M Guinard (France) A Rinderknech	7^{7}	6
2	(India) A Chandrasekar (India) VS Prashanth	6^{4}	3
