= 2025 Advantage Cars Prague Open – Men's singles =

Men's singles
- 2025 Advantage Cars Prague Open

Final
- Champion: (Austria) Filip Misolic
- Runner-up: (Netherlands) Guy den Ouden
- Score: 6–4, 6–0

Events
Singles	men	women
Doubles	men	women
- Advantage Cars Prague Open

Jiří Veselý was the defending champion but chose not to defend his title.

Filip Misolic won the title after defeating Guy den Ouden 6–4, 6–0 in the final.

== Seeds ==
1. (Japan) Shintaro Mochizuki (first round)
2. (Spain) Martín Landaluce (semifinals)
3. (Belgium) Alexander Blockx (quarterfinals)
4. (Kazakhstan) Dmitry Popko (first round)
5. (Georgia (country)) Nikoloz Basilashvili (second round)
6. (Spain) Alejandro Moro Cañas (first round)
7. (Kazakhstan) Mikhail Kukushkin (second round, withdrew)
8. (India) Sumit Nagal (first round)

== Draw ==
Key

- Q = Qualifier
- WC = Wild card
- LL = Lucky loser
- Alt = Alternate
- ITF = ITF entry
- PR = Protected ranking
- SR = Special ranking
- SE = Special exempt
- JE = Junior exempt
- JR = Junior Accelerator Programme entrant
- CO = College Accelerator Programme entrant
- NG = Next Gen Accelerator Program entrant
- w/o = Walkover
- r = Retired
- d = Defaulted

=== Finals ===
Semifinals
(Slovakia) Lukáš Klein	6^{4}	2
(Austria) Filip Misolic	7^{7}	6
Q	(Netherlands) Guy den Ouden	6	7^{7}
2	(Spain) Martín Landaluce	0	6^{5}

Final
(Austria) Filip Misolic	6	6
Q	(Netherlands) Guy den Ouden	4	0

=== Top half ===
First round
1	(Japan) S Mochizuki	3	6	2
WC	(Czech Republic) Petr Brunclík	6	4	6
Q	(France) M Chazal	4	7	7
(Kazakhstan) B Zhukayev	6	5	5
(Denmark) A Holmgren	3	5
(Slovakia) L Klein	6	7
WC	(Czech Republic) M Mrva	0	7	4
7	(Kazakhstan) M Kukushkin	6	5	6
4	(Kazakhstan) D Popko	6^{3}	6	2
LL	(France) S Gueymard Wayenburg	7^{7}	4	6
WC	(Netherlands) M Röttgering	6	7^{7}
Q	(Spain) D Rincón	4	6^{5}
Q	(Czech Republic) J Kumstát	4	5
(Austria) F Misolic	6	7
CO	(France) Antoine Cornut-Chauvinc	2	6	4
5	(Georgia (country)) N Basilashvili	6	1	6

Second round
WC	(Czech Republic) P Brunclík	4	3
Q	(France) M Chazal	6	6
(Slovakia) L Klein	w/o
7	(Kazakhstan) M Kukushkin
LL	(France) S Gueymard Wayenburg	2	2
WC	(Netherlands) M Röttgering	6	6
(Austria) F Misolic	6	7
5	(Georgia (country)) N Basilashvili	0	5

Quarterfinals
Q	(France) M Chazal	6^{4}	3
(Slovakia) L Klein	7^{7}	6
WC	(Netherlands) M Röttgering	2	2
(Austria) F Misolic	6	6

Semifinals
(Slovakia) L Klein	6^{4}	2
(Austria) F Misolic	7^{7}	6

=== Bottom half ===
First round
8	(India) S Nagal	1	1
Q	(Netherlands) G den Ouden	6	6
Q	(Czech Republic) H Bartoň	4	6	6
(Austria) L Neumayer	6	1	2
(United Kingdom) J Choinski	6	7
(Portugal) H Rocha	3	5
(Lebanon) H Habib	4	2
3	(Belgium) A Blockx	6	6
6	(Spain) A Moro Cañas	5	1
JR	(Norway) N Budkov Kjær	7	6
Q	(Ukraine) V Sachko	4	5
(France) C Hemery	6	7
(South Africa) L Harris	1	5
(United Kingdom) D Evans	6	7
Alt	(Austria) J Rodionov	7	2	5
2	(Spain) M Landaluce	5	6	7

Second round
Q	(Netherlands) G den Ouden	6	6
Q	(Czech Republic) H Bartoň	3	2
(United Kingdom) J Choinski	6	2	6^{1}
3	(Belgium) A Blockx	4	6	7^{7}
JR	(Norway) N Budkov Kjær	6	6
(France) C Hemery	2	3
(United Kingdom) D Evans	3	3
2	(Spain) M Landaluce	6	6

Quarterfinals
Q	(Netherlands) G den Ouden	3	6	6
3	(Belgium) A Blockx	6	4	1
JR	(Norway) N Budkov Kjær	4	3
2	(Spain) M Landaluce	6	6

Semifinals
Q	(Netherlands) G den Ouden	6	7^{7}
2	(Spain) M Landaluce	0	6^{5}
