= 2024 Platzmann-Sauerland Open =

- Date: 29 July – 3 August
- Edition: 4th
- Surface: Clay
- Location: Lüdenscheid, Germany

Champions

Singles
- (Belgium) Raphaël Collignon

Doubles
- (Netherlands) David Pel / (Netherlands) Bart Stevens
- Platzmann-Sauerland Open

The 2024 Platzmann Open was a professional tennis tournament played on clay courts. It was the fourth edition of the tournament which was part of the 2024 ATP Challenger Tour. It took place in Lüdenscheid, Germany, between 29 July and 3 August 2024.

== Singles main draw entrants ==
=== Seeds ===
Country	Player	Rank^{1}	Seed
NED	Botic van de Zandschulp	85	1
ARG	Marco Trungelliti	136	2
ARG	Román Andrés Burruchaga	148	3
FRA	Titouan Droguet	152	4
ESP	Oriol Roca Batalla	158	5
AUT	Jurij Rodionov	176	6
GER	Henri Squire	184	7
POL	Kamil Majchrzak	190	8

- ^{1} Rankings as of 22 July 2024.

=== Other entrants ===
The following players received wildcards into the singles main draw:

- (Germany) Diego Dedura-Palomero
- (Germany) Justin Engel
- (Germany) Max Schönhaus

The following players received entry into the singles main draw as alternates:

- (South Korea) Gerard Campaña Lee
- (Belgium) Raphaël Collignon

The following players received entry from the qualifying draw:

- (Spain) Max Alcalá Gurri
- (Bosnia and Herzegovina) Mirza Bašić
- (Poland) Olaf Pieczkowski
- (Germany) Marko Topo
- (Germany) Marlon Vankan
- (Brazil) Nicolas Zanellato

== Champions ==
=== Singles ===
- (Belgium) Raphaël Collignon def. (Netherlands) Botic van de Zandschulp 3–6, 6–4, 6–3.

=== Doubles ===
- (Netherlands) David Pel / (Netherlands) Bart Stevens def. (Netherlands) Matwé Middelkoop / (Ukraine) Denys Molchanov 6–4, 2–6, [10–8].
