= 2025 Platzmann Open =

- Date: 28 July – 3 August
- Edition: 5th
- Surface: Clay
- Location: Hagen, Germany

Champions

Singles
- (Germany) Yannick Hanfmann

Doubles
- (Germany) Hendrik Jebens / (France) Albano Olivetti
- Platzmann Open

The 2025 Platzmann Open was a professional tennis tournament played on clay courts. It was the fifth edition of the tournament which was part of the 2025 ATP Challenger Tour. It took place in Hagen, Germany, between 28 July and 3 August 2025.

== Singles main draw entrants ==
=== Seeds ===
Country	Player	Rank^{1}	Seed
NED	Botic van de Zandschulp	103	1
LTU	Vilius Gaubas	135	2
GER	Yannick Hanfmann	141	3
SUI	Jérôme Kym	145	4
GBR	Jan Choinski	149	5
NED	Guy den Ouden	178	6
~~ARG~~	~~Facundo Díaz Acosta~~	~~186~~	~~7~~
LBN	Benjamin Hassan	189	8
AUT	Jurij Rodionov	193	9

- ^{1} Rankings as of 21 July 2025.

=== Other entrants ===
The following players received wildcards into the singles main draw:

- (Germany) Daniel Masur
- (Germany) Niels McDonald
- (Germany) Max Schönhaus

The following player received entry into the singles main draw through the College Accelerator programme:

- (Japan) Jay Dylan Hara Friend

The following player received entry into the singles main draw through the Next Gen Accelerator programme:

- (Austria) Joel Schwärzler

The following players received entry into the singles main draw as alternates:

- (Italy) Marco Cecchinato
- (India) Sumit Nagal

The following players received entry from the qualifying draw:

- (Bulgaria) Alexander Donski
- (Argentina) Mariano Kestelboim
- (United Kingdom) Anton Matusevich
- (Croatia) Luka Mikrut
- (Argentina) Gonzalo Villanueva
- (Sweden) Olle Wallin

The following player received entry as a lucky loser:

- (United States) Dali Blanch

== Champions ==
=== Singles ===
- (Germany) Yannick Hanfmann def. (Netherlands) Guy den Ouden 3–6, 6–2, 6–2.

=== Doubles ===
- (Germany) Hendrik Jebens / (France) Albano Olivetti def. (United States) Vasil Kirkov / (Netherlands) Bart Stevens 6–4, 6–7^{(2–7)}, [10–8].
