= 2023 Platzmann-Sauerland Open =

- Date: 31 July – 5 August
- Edition: 3rd
- Surface: Clay
- Location: Lüdenscheid, Germany

Champions

Singles
- (Croatia) Duje Ajduković

Doubles
- (Switzerland) Luca Margaroli / (Argentina) Santiago Rodríguez Taverna
- Platzmann-Sauerland Open

The 2023 Platzmann-Sauerland Open was a professional tennis tournament played on clay courts. It was the third edition of the tournament which was part of the 2023 ATP Challenger Tour. It took place in Lüdenscheid, Germany, between 31 July and 5 August 2023.

== Singles main draw entrants ==
=== Seeds ===
Country	Player	Rank^{1}	Seed
HUN	Fábián Marozsán	87	1
ESP	Pedro Martínez	130	2
FRA	Benoît Paire	131	3
KAZ	Timofey Skatov	136	4
GER	Maximilian Marterer	144	5
ITA	Raúl Brancaccio	147	6
GBR	Jan Choinski	151	7
BOL	Hugo Dellien	164	8

- ^{1} Rankings as of 24 July 2023.

=== Other entrants ===
The following players received wildcards into the singles main draw:

- (Germany) Liam Gavrielides
- (Germany) Max Hans Rehberg
- (Germany) Louis Wessels

The following player received entry into the singles main draw as an alternate:

- (Germany) Henri Squire

The following players received entry from the qualifying draw:

- (Croatia) Duje Ajduković
- (Italy) Tommaso Compagnucci
- (Ukraine) Georgii Kravchenko
- (Germany) Marvin Möller
- (Syria) Hazem Naw
- (Brazil) Marcelo Zormann

== Champions ==
=== Singles ===
- (Croatia) Duje Ajduković def. (Bolivia) Hugo Dellien 7–5, 6–4.

=== Doubles ===
- (Switzerland) Luca Margaroli / (Argentina) Santiago Rodríguez Taverna def. (Germany) Jakob Schnaitter / (Germany) Kai Wehnelt 7–6^{(7–4)}, 6–4.
