= 2024 Open Quimper Bretagne – Singles =

Singles
- 2024 Open Quimper Bretagne

Final
- Champion: (France) Pierre-Hugues Herbert
- Runner-up: (Croatia) Duje Ajduković
- Score: 6–3, 6–2

Events
Singles	Doubles
- Open Quimper Bretagne

Grégoire Barrère was the defending champion but lost in the first round to Otto Virtanen.

Pierre-Hugues Herbert won the title after defeating Duje Ajduković 6–3, 6–2 in the final.

== Seeds ==
1. (France) Grégoire Barrère (first round)
2. (France) Arthur Rinderknech (quarterfinals)
3. (France) Hugo Gaston (withdrew)
4. (France) Constant Lestienne (first round)
5. (United States) Michael Mmoh (first round)
6. (United States) Maxime Cressy (quarterfinals)
7. (Czech Republic) Vít Kopřiva (second round)
8. (Canada) Gabriel Diallo (second round)
9. (Croatia) Duje Ajduković (final)

== Draw ==
Key

- Q = Qualifier
- WC = Wild card
- LL = Lucky loser
- Alt = Alternate
- ITF = ITF entry
- PR = Protected ranking
- SR = Special ranking
- SE = Special exempt
- JE = Junior exempt
- JR = Junior Accelerator Programme entrant
- CO = College Accelerator Programme entrant
- NG = Next Gen Accelerator Program entrant
- w/o = Walkover
- r = Retired
- d = Defaulted

=== Finals ===
Semifinals
(France) Harold Mayot	6^{5}	3
9	(Croatia) Duje Ajduković	7^{7}	6
WC	(France) Matteo Martineau	6^{4}	4
Alt	(France) Pierre-Hugues Herbert	7^{7}	6

Final
9	(Croatia) Duje Ajduković	3	2
Alt	(France) Pierre-Hugues Herbert	6	6

=== Top half ===
First round
1	(France) G Barrère	5	4
(Finland) O Virtanen	7	6
WC	(France) M Guinard	5	5
(France) K Jacquet	7	7
(France) H Mayot	4	6	6
(Austria) F Misolic	6	1	4
(Sweden) E Ymer	5	2
8	(Canada) G Diallo	7	6
9	(Croatia) D Ajduković	6	7^{8}
(France) C Hemery	4	6^{6}
Alt	(Tunisia) A Dougaz	5	7^{7}	6
Q	(Italy) Samuel Vincent Ruggeri	7	6^{4}	4
Q	(France) Émilien Voisin	6	3	2
Q	(Lithuania) R Berankis	4	6	6
Alt	(France) G Blancaneaux	6	4	2
6	(United States) M Cressy	3	6	6

Second round
(Finland) O Virtanen	1	4
(France) K Jacquet	6	1^{r}
(France) H Mayot	7^{7}	7^{7}
8	(Canada) G Diallo	6^{3}	6^{1}
9	(Croatia) D Ajduković	7^{7}	6
Alt	(Tunisia) A Dougaz	6^{3}	2
Q	(Lithuania) R Berankis	3	5
6	(United States) M Cressy	6	7

Quarterfinals
(Finland) O Virtanen
(France) H Mayot	w/o
9	(Croatia) D Ajduković	6	3	7
6	(United States) M Cressy	4	6	5

Semifinals
(France) H Mayot	6^{5}	3
9	(Croatia) D Ajduković	7^{7}	6

=== Bottom half ===
First round
7	(Czech Republic) V Kopřiva	6	6
WC	(France) L Pouille	2	4
WC	(France) M Martineau	3	6	7^{7}
(France) G Mpetshi Perricard	6	4	6^{3}
Q	(France) M Bourgue	7^{7}	6
(Netherlands) G Brouwer	6^{5}	4
(United Kingdom) B Harris	7^{7}	7^{7}
4	(France) C Lestienne	6^{4}	6^{2}
5	(United States) M Mmoh	6^{7}	5
Alt	(France) P-H Herbert	7^{9}	7
LL	(France) T Lamasine	6	6^{5}	6
Q	(Tunisia) M Echargui	4	7^{7}	3
(Bulgaria) D Kuzmanov	4	6	6
Q	(France) D Added	6	0	3
(France) U Blanchet	4	4
2	(France) A Rinderknech	6	6

Second round
7	(Czech Republic) V Kopřiva	5	4
WC	(France) M Martineau	7	6
Q	(France) M Bourgue	4	7^{7}	6
(United Kingdom) B Harris	6	6^{5}	3
Alt	(France) P-H Herbert	7^{8}	7
LL	(France) T Lamasine	6^{6}	5
(Bulgaria) D Kuzmanov	4	7^{8}	5
2	(France) A Rinderknech	6	6^{6}	7

Quarterfinals
WC	(France) M Martineau	6	7^{7}
Q	(France) M Bourgue	3	6^{5}
Alt	(France) P-H Herbert	7^{7}	6
2	(France) A Rinderknech	6^{5}	3

Semifinals
WC	(France) M Martineau	6^{4}	4
Alt	(France) P-H Herbert	7^{7}	6
