= 2026 Dutch Open – Doubles =

Doubles
- 2026 Dutch Open

Final
- Champions: (Czech Republic) Andrew Paulson (Belgium) Joran Vliegen
- Runners-up: (Romania) Victor Vlad Cornea (Israel) Daniel Cukierman
- Score: 7–6^{(7–5)}, 6–2

Events
Singles	Doubles
- Dutch Open

Michael Geerts and Tim Rühl were the defending champions but chose not to defend their title.

Andrew Paulson and Joran Vliegen won the title after defeating Victor Vlad Cornea and Daniel Cukierman 7–6^{(7–5)}, 6–2 in the final.

== Seeds ==
1. (Australia) Matthew Romios / (Japan) Kaito Uesugi (semifinals)
2. (Romania) Victor Vlad Cornea / (Israel) Daniel Cukierman (final)
3. (Netherlands) Jarno Jans / (Netherlands) Niels Visker (first round)
4. (Czech Republic) Andrew Paulson / (Belgium) Joran Vliegen (champions)

== Draw ==
Key

- Q = Qualifier
- WC = Wild card
- LL = Lucky loser
- Alt = Alternate
- ITF = ITF entry
- PR = Protected ranking
- SR = Special ranking
- SE = Special exempt
- JE = Junior exempt
- JR = Junior Accelerator Programme entrant
- CO = College Accelerator Programme entrant
- NG = Next Gen Accelerator Program entrant
- w/o = Walkover
- r = Retired
- d = Defaulted

First round
1	(Australia) M Romios (Japan) K Uesugi	6	6
(United States) Samuel Battistone (United States) Jack Vance	4	3
(Czech Republic) H Bartoň (Czech Republic) J Kumstát	6	6
(South Korea) G Campaña Lee (Ukraine) V Uzhylovskyi	3	2
4	(Czech Republic) A Paulson (Belgium) J Vliegen	7	6
(Australia) J Taylor (United States) Jamie Vance	5	2
(Bulgaria) D Kuzmanov (Kazakhstan) D Yevseyev	2	3
WC	(Netherlands) Abel Forger (Netherlands) Fons van Sambeek	6	6
(India) Madhwin Kamath (India) Atharva Sharma	6^{4}	4
(Netherlands) M Hermans (Peru) A Merino	7^{7}	6
(Chinese Taipei) T-h Huang (China) B Zheng	7^{7}	7^{7}
3	(Netherlands) J Jans (Netherlands) N Visker	6^{2}	6^{5}
(Netherlands) D de Jonge (Germany) J Opitz	3	4
Alt	(Brazil) M Alves (Spain) Oscar José Gutierrez	6	6
S Betov (Chinese Taipei) J Hsu	3	1
2	(Romania) V Cornea (Israel) D Cukierman	6	6

Quarterfinals
1	(Australia) M Romios (Japan) K Uesugi	6	6
(Czech Republic) H Bartoň (Czech Republic) J Kumstát	4	2
4	(Czech Republic) A Paulson (Belgium) J Vliegen	7^{7}	7
WC	(Netherlands) A Forger (Netherlands) F van Sambeek	6^{5}	5
(Netherlands) M Hermans (Peru) A Merino	1	6	[10]
(Chinese Taipei) T-h Huang (China) B Zheng	6	4	[8]
Alt	(Brazil) M Alves (Spain) OJ Gutierrez	4	3
2	(Romania) V Cornea (Israel) D Cukierman	6	6

Semifinals
1	(Australia) M Romios (Japan) K Uesugi	6	5	[3]
4	(Czech Republic) A Paulson (Belgium) J Vliegen	4	7	[10]
(Netherlands) M Hermans (Peru) A Merino	4	4
2	(Romania) V Cornea (Israel) D Cukierman	6	6

Final
4	(Czech Republic) A Paulson (Belgium) J Vliegen	7^{7}	6
2	(Romania) V Cornea (Israel) D Cukierman	6^{5}	2
