= 2022 Platzmann-Sauerland Open – Singles =

Singles
- 2022 Platzmann-Sauerland Open

Final
- Champion: (Serbia) Hamad Međedović
- Runner-up: (China) Zhang Zhizhen
- Score: 6–1, 6–2

Events
Singles	Doubles
- Platzmann-Sauerland Open

Daniel Altmaier was the defending champion but chose not to defend his title.

Hamad Međedović won the title after defeating Zhang Zhizhen 6–1, 6–2 in the final.

== Seeds ==
1. (Chile) Nicolás Jarry (semifinals)
2. (Germany) Mats Moraing (first round)
3. (France) Manuel Guinard (second round)
4. (Italy) Marco Cecchinato (quarterfinals)
5. (Argentina) Santiago Rodríguez Taverna (quarterfinals)
6. (Switzerland) Dominic Stricker (first round)
7. (Uruguay) Pablo Cuevas (quarterfinals)
8. (Slovakia) Filip Horanský (second round)

== Draw ==
Key

- Q = Qualifier
- WC = Wild card
- LL = Lucky loser
- Alt = Alternate
- ITF = ITF entry
- PR = Protected ranking
- SR = Special ranking
- SE = Special exempt
- JE = Junior exempt
- JR = Junior Accelerator Programme entrant
- CO = College Accelerator Programme entrant
- NG = Next Gen Accelerator Program entrant
- w/o = Walkover
- r = Retired
- d = Defaulted

=== Finals ===
Semifinals
1	(Chile) Nicolás Jarry	3	7^{8}	2
Q	(Serbia) Hamad Međedović	6	6^{6}	6
(China) Zhang Zhizhen	6	6
(Slovakia) Jozef Kovalík	3	4

Final
Q	(Serbia) Hamad Međedović	6	6
(China) Zhang Zhizhen	1	2

=== Top half ===
First round
1	(Chile) N Jarry	6	6
(Brazil) D Dutra da Silva	2	3
Alt	A Vatutin	4	2
(Argentina) F Díaz Acosta	6	6
WC	(Germany) Marcel Zielinski	7^{7}	2	4
LL	(Kazakhstan) D Yevseyev	6^{3}	6	6
Q	B Bobrov	6^{5}	6	2
5	(Argentina) S Rodríguez Taverna	7^{7}	4	6
4	(Italy) M Cecchinato	6	6
Alt	(Romania) ND Ionel	0	0
Q	(Ukraine) G Kravchenko	7^{7}	6^{4}	2
Q	(Germany) Timo Stodder	6^{4}	7^{7}	6
(Ukraine) V Sachko	3	3
Q	(Serbia) H Međedović	6	6
WC	(Germany) R Molleker	6^{4}	2
8	(Slovakia) F Horanský	7^{7}	6

Second round
1	(Chile) N Jarry	7	3	7
(Argentina) F Díaz Acosta	5	6	5
LL	(Kazakhstan) D Yevseyev	2	3
5	(Argentina) S Rodríguez Taverna	6	6
4	(Italy) M Cecchinato	7^{7}	6
Q	(Germany) T Stodder	6^{4}	4
Q	(Serbia) H Međedović	6	6
8	(Slovakia) F Horanský	1	3

Quarterfinals
1	(Chile) N Jarry	4	6	6
5	(Argentina) S Rodríguez Taverna	6	4	2
4	(Italy) M Cecchinato	1	1
Q	(Serbia) H Međedović	6	6

Semifinals
1	(Chile) N Jarry	3	7^{8}	2
Q	(Serbia) H Međedović	6	6^{6}	6

=== Bottom half ===
First round
7	(Uruguay) P Cuevas	3	6	6
Q	(Egypt) M Safwat	6	1	4
Q	(Germany) Jeremy Jahn	6	3	4
(Argentina) N Kicker	4	6	6
(China) Zh Zhang	7	6
(Spain) J Barranco Cosano	5	3
(Germany) J Lenz	6	3	6^{8}
3	(France) M Guinard	2	6	7^{10}
6	(Switzerland) D Stricker	4	4
(Netherlands) R Haase	6	6
Alt	(Germany) T Kamke	4	3
WC	(Germany) M Topo	6	6
(Slovakia) J Kovalík	6	6
(Germany) C-M Stebe	3	4
(Ukraine) O Krutykh	7^{11}	6
2	(Germany) M Moraing	6^{9}	3

Second round
7	(Uruguay) P Cuevas	6	6
(Argentina) N Kicker	4	1
(China) Zh Zhang	6	7
3	(France) M Guinard	1	5
(Netherlands) R Haase	7^{7}	6
WC	(Germany) M Topo	6^{2}	4
(Slovakia) J Kovalík	4	6	7
(Ukraine) O Krutykh	6	1	5

Quarterfinals
7	(Uruguay) P Cuevas	3	1
(China) Zh Zhang	6	6
(Netherlands) R Haase	3	2
(Slovakia) J Kovalík	6	6

Semifinals
(China) Zh Zhang	6	6
(Slovakia) J Kovalík	3	4
