= 2025 Advantage Cars Prague Open – Men's doubles =

Men's doubles
- 2025 Advantage Cars Prague Open

Final
- Champions: (Ukraine) Denys Molchanov (Czech Republic) Matěj Vocel
- Runners-up: (Austria) David Pichler (Austria) Jurij Rodionov
- Score: 7–6^{(7–3)}, 6–3

Events
Singles	men	women
Doubles	men	women
- Advantage Cars Prague Open

Jakob Schnaitter and Mark Wallner were the defending champions but chose not to defend their title.

Denys Molchanov and Matěj Vocel won the title after defeating David Pichler and Jurij Rodionov 7–6^{(7–3)}, 6–3 in the final.

== Seeds ==
1. (Monaco) Romain Arneodo / (France) Manuel Guinard (quarterfinals)
2. (India) Vijay Sundar Prashanth / (Mexico) Miguel Ángel Reyes-Varela (first round)
3. (Canada) Cleeve Harper / (United States) Ryan Seggerman (first round)
4. (Brazil) Marcelo Demoliner / (Netherlands) David Pel (quarterfinals)

== Draw ==
Key

- Q = Qualifier
- WC = Wild card
- LL = Lucky loser
- Alt = Alternate
- ITF = ITF entry
- PR = Protected ranking
- SR = Special ranking
- SE = Special exempt
- JE = Junior exempt
- JR = Junior Accelerator Programme entrant
- CO = College Accelerator Programme entrant
- NG = Next Gen Accelerator Program entrant
- w/o = Walkover
- r = Retired
- d = Defaulted

=== Draw ===
First round
1	(Monaco) R Arneodo (France) M Guinard	6	7^{7}
(Germany) A Mies (Spain) D Vega Hernández	3	6^{5}
(Italy) M Bortolotti (Colombia) C Rodríguez	6	3	[6]
(Austria) D Pichler (Austria) J Rodionov	3	6	[10]
4	(Brazil) M Demoliner (Netherlands) D Pel	6	6
(India) N Kaliyanda Poonacha (Brazil) M Zormann	4	4
(India) A Chandrasekar (United Kingdom) D Stevenson	6	6^{6}	[3]
WC	(Czech Republic) M Mrva (Czech Republic) J Veselý	3	7^{8}	[10]
(Finland) P Niklas-Salminen (Poland) S Walków	2	6^{4}
(Ukraine) D Molchanov (Czech Republic) M Vocel	6	7^{7}
(United States) P Trhac (United Kingdom) M Willis	6^{5}	7	[10]
3	(Canada) C Harper (United States) R Seggerman	7^{7}	5	[6]
(Japan) S Mochizuki (Canada) K Stevenson	4	4
WC	(Czech Republic) H Bartoň (Czech Republic) Jakub Nicod	6	6
(Slovakia) M Karol (Austria) N Oberleitner	6	7^{8}
2	(India) VS Prashanth (Mexico) M Reyes-Varela	4	6^{6}

Quarterfinals
1	(Monaco) R Arneodo (France) M Guinard	2	6	[4]
(Austria) D Pichler (Austria) J Rodionov	6	3	[10]
4	(Brazil) M Demoliner (Netherlands) D Pel	5	6^{7}
WC	(Czech Republic) M Mrva (Czech Republic) J Veselý	7	7^{9}
(Ukraine) D Molchanov (Czech Republic) M Vocel	4	6	[10]
(United States) P Trhac (United Kingdom) M Willis	6	2	[6]
WC	(Czech Republic) H Bartoň (Czech Republic) J Nicod	6^{2}	1
(Slovakia) M Karol (Austria) N Oberleitner	7^{7}	6

Semifinals
(Austria) D Pichler (Austria) J Rodionov	6	6
WC	(Czech Republic) M Mrva (Czech Republic) J Veselý	3	3
(Ukraine) D Molchanov (Czech Republic) M Vocel	7	6
(Slovakia) M Karol (Austria) N Oberleitner	5	4

Final
(Austria) D Pichler (Austria) J Rodionov	6^{3}	3
(Ukraine) D Molchanov (Czech Republic) M Vocel	7^{7}	6
