= 2026 Dutch Open – Singles =

Singles
- 2026 Dutch Open

Final
- Champion: (Netherlands) Guy den Ouden
- Runner-up: (Germany) Tom Gentzsch
- Score: 6–4, 4–6, 6–0

Events
Singles	Doubles
- Dutch Open

Jan Choinski was the defending champion but chose not to defend his title.

Guy den Ouden won the title after defeating Tom Gentzsch 6–4, 4–6, 6–0 in the final.

== Seeds ==
1. (Chile) Tomás Barrios Vera (first round)
2. (Belgium) Gauthier Onclin (first round)
3. (Spain) David Jordà Sanchis (first round)
4. (Belgium) Gilles-Arnaud Bailly (first round)
5. (Germany) Tom Gentzsch (final)
6. (Belgium) Kimmer Coppejans (semifinals)
7. (Germany) Henri Squire (first round)
8. (Brazil) João Lucas Reis da Silva (first round)

== Draw ==
Key

- Q = Qualifier
- WC = Wild card
- LL = Lucky loser
- Alt = Alternate
- ITF = ITF entry
- PR = Protected ranking
- SR = Special ranking
- SE = Special exempt
- JE = Junior exempt
- JR = Junior Accelerator Programme entrant
- CO = College Accelerator Programme entrant
- NG = Next Gen Accelerator Program entrant
- w/o = Walkover
- r = Retired
- d = Defaulted

=== Finals ===
Semifinals
(Netherlands) Guy den Ouden	6	7^{7}
6	(Belgium) Kimmer Coppejans	2	6^{3}
5	(Germany) Tom Gentzsch	7	6
Q	(Czech Republic) Jan Kumstát	5	4

Final
(Netherlands) Guy den Ouden	6	4	6
5	(Germany) Tom Gentzsch	4	6	0

=== Top half ===
First round
1	(Chile) T Barrios Vera	4	4
WC	(Netherlands) N Visker	6	6
Alt	(Switzerland) M Brunold	6	2	3
Q	(Netherlands) Ryan Nijboer	4	6	6
(Netherlands) G den Ouden	6	6
LL	(Kazakhstan) D Yevseyev	3	0
(Czech Republic) H Bartoň	6^{4}	6	6
8	(Brazil) JL Reis da Silva	7^{7}	2	4
4	(Belgium) GA Bailly	6	4	2
(Italy) F Romano	2	6	6
(Colombia) DE Galán	4	6	6
Q	(Netherlands) Abel Forger	6	3	2
(United Kingdom) J Clarke	6	3	0^{r}
Q	(Germany) L Wessels	4	6	4
(Brazil) P Boscardin Dias	2	5
6	(Belgium) K Coppejans	6	7

Second round
WC	(Netherlands) N Visker	2	3
Q	(Netherlands) R Nijboer	6	6
(Netherlands) G den Ouden	4	6	6
(Czech Republic) H Bartoň	6	3	2
(Italy) F Romano	5	4
(Colombia) DE Galán	7	6
Q	(Germany) L Wessels	3	1
6	(Belgium) K Coppejans	6	6

Quarterfinals
Q	(Netherlands) R Nijboer	4	6^{3}
(Netherlands) G den Ouden	6	7^{7}
(Colombia) DE Galán	2	1
6	(Belgium) K Coppejans	6	6

Semifinals
(Netherlands) G den Ouden	6	7^{7}
6	(Belgium) K Coppejans	2	6^{3}

=== Bottom half ===
First round
5	(Germany) T Gentzsch	7	6
Q	(Germany) Mika Petkovic	5	4
WC	(Netherlands) Pieter de Lange	6	6
(Belgium) M Geerts	2	2
JR	(Spain) A Santamarta Roig	5	1
(Germany) M Schönhaus	7	6
(Netherlands) M Houkes	6	6
3	(Spain) D Jordà Sanchis	3	1
7	(Germany) H Squire	3	1
Q	(Czech Republic) J Kumstát	6	6
SE	(Germany) F Broska	3	6	6
P Bar Biryukov	6	2	3
(France) M Martineau	4	4
Q	(South Korea) G Campaña Lee	6	6
WC	(Netherlands) T Boogaard	3	7^{7}	6
2	(Belgium) G Onclin	6	6^{3}	4

Second round
5	(Germany) T Gentzsch	6	6
WC	(Netherlands) P de Lange	3	2
(Germany) M Schönhaus	4	1
(Netherlands) M Houkes	6	6
Q	(Czech Republic) J Kumstát	6^{5}	6	6
SE	(Germany) F Broska	7^{7}	4	4
Q	(South Korea) G Campaña Lee	0	6	2^{r}
WC	(Netherlands) T Boogaard	6	4	4

Quarterfinals
5	(Germany) T Gentzsch	3	7^{7}	6
(Netherlands) M Houkes	6	6^{4}	4
Q	(Czech Republic) J Kumstát	6	6
WC	(Netherlands) T Boogaard	1	1

Semifinals
5	(Germany) T Gentzsch	7	6
Q	(Czech Republic) J Kumstát	5	4
