= 2024 Open Quimper Bretagne =

- Date: 23–28 January
- Edition: 15th
- Surface: Hard (indoor)
- Location: Quimper, France

Champions

Singles
- (France) Pierre-Hugues Herbert

Doubles
- (France) Manuel Guinard / (France) Arthur Rinderknech
← 2023 ·	Open Quimper Bretagne	· 2025 →

The 2024 Open Quimper Bretagne Occidentale was a professional tennis tournament played on hard courts. It was the 15th edition of the tournament which was part of the 2024 ATP Challenger Tour. It took place in Quimper, France between 23 and 28 January 2024.

== Singles main-draw entrants ==
=== Seeds ===
Country	Player	Rank^{1}	Seed
FRA	Grégoire Barrère	83	1
FRA	Arthur Rinderknech	94	2
~~FRA~~	~~Hugo Gaston~~	~~97~~	~~3~~
FRA	Constant Lestienne	99	4
USA	Michael Mmoh	104	5
USA	Maxime Cressy	123	6
CZE	Vít Kopřiva	132	7
CAN	Gabriel Diallo	135	8
CRO	Duje Ajduković	141	9

- ^{1} Rankings are as of 15 January 2024.

=== Other entrants ===
The following players received wildcards into the singles main draw:

- (France) Manuel Guinard
- (France) Matteo Martineau
- (France) Lucas Pouille

The following players received entry into the singles main draw as alternates:

- (France) Geoffrey Blancaneaux
- (Tunisia) Aziz Dougaz
- (France) Pierre-Hugues Herbert

The following players received entry from the qualifying draw:

- (France) Dan Added
- (Lithuania) Ričardas Berankis
- (France) Mathias Bourgue
- (Tunisia) Moez Echargui
- (Italy) Samuel Vincent Ruggeri
- (France) Émilien Voisin

The following player received entry as a lucky loser:

- (France) Tristan Lamasine

== Champions ==
=== Singles ===
- (France) Pierre-Hugues Herbert def. (Croatia) Duje Ajduković 6–3, 6–2.

=== Doubles ===
- (France) Manuel Guinard / (France) Arthur Rinderknech def. (India) Anirudh Chandrasekar / (India) Vijay Sundar Prashanth 7–6^{(7–4)}, 6–3.
