= 2022 Platzmann-Sauerland Open =

- Date: 27 June – 3 July
- Edition: 2nd
- Surface: Clay
- Location: Lüdenscheid, Germany

Champions

Singles
- (Serbia) Hamad Međedović

Doubles
- (Netherlands) Robin Haase / (Netherlands) Sem Verbeek
- Platzmann-Sauerland Open

The 2022 Platzmann-Sauerland Open was a professional tennis tournament played on clay courts. It was the second edition of the tournament which was part of the 2022 ATP Challenger Tour. It took place in Lüdenscheid, Germany, between 27 June and 3 July 2022.

== Singles main draw entrants ==
=== Seeds ===
Country	Player	Rank^{1}	Seed
CHI	Nicolás Jarry	129	1
GER	Mats Moraing	142	2
FRA	Manuel Guinard	154	3
ITA	Marco Cecchinato	171	4
ARG	Santiago Rodríguez Taverna	179	5
SUI	Dominic Stricker	188	6
URU	Pablo Cuevas	189	7
SVK	Filip Horanský	195	8

- ^{1} Rankings as of 20 June 2022.

=== Other entrants ===
The following players received wildcards into the singles main draw:

- (Germany) Rudolf Molleker
- (Germany) Marko Topo
- (Germany) Marcel Zielinski

The following players received entry into the singles main draw as alternates:

- (Romania) Nicholas David Ionel
- (Germany) Tobias Kamke
- Alexey Vatutin

The following players received entry from the qualifying draw:

- Bogdan Bobrov
- (Germany) Jeremy Jahn
- (Ukraine) Georgii Kravchenko
- (Serbia) Hamad Međedović
- (Egypt) Mohamed Safwat
- (Germany) Timo Stodder

The following player received entry as a lucky loser:

- (Kazakhstan) Denis Yevseyev

== Champions ==
=== Singles ===
- (Serbia) Hamad Međedović def. (China) Zhang Zhizhen 6–1, 6–2.

=== Doubles ===
- (Netherlands) Robin Haase / (Netherlands) Sem Verbeek def. (Germany) Fabian Fallert / (Germany) Hendrik Jebens 6–2, 5–7, [10–3].
