= 2026 Platzmann Open =

- Date: 3 – 9 August
- Edition: 6th
- Surface: Clay
- Location: Hagen, Germany

Champions

Singles
- (Germany) Tom Gentzsch

Doubles
- (Croatia) Admir Kalender / (Croatia) Nino Serdarušić
- Platzmann Open

The 2026 Platzmann Open was a professional tennis tournament played on clay courts. It was the sixth edition of the tournament which was part of the 2026 ATP Challenger Tour. It took place in Hagen, Germany, between 3 and 9 August 2026.

== Singles main draw entrants ==
=== Seeds ===
| Country | Player | Rank^{1} | Seed |
|---|---|---|---|
| SVK | Alex Molčan | 74 | 1 |
| ~~GBR~~ | ~~Jan Choinski~~ | ~~88~~ | ~~2~~ |
| HUN | Zsombor Piros | 122 | 3 |
| LTU | Vilius Gaubas | 128 | 4 |
| FRA | Alexandre Müller | 132 | 5 |
| ITA | Stefano Travaglia | 142 | 6 |
| KAZ | Timofey Skatov | 150 | 7 |
| CZE | Zdeněk Kolář | 154 | 8 |

- ^{1} Rankings as of 27 July 2026.

=== Other entrants ===
The following players received wildcards into the singles main draw:

- (Germany) Diego Dedura
- (Germany) Niels McDonald
- (Germany) Max Schönhaus

The following player received entry into the singles main draw as a special exempt:

- (Germany) Jamie Mackenzie

The following player received entry into the singles main draw as an alternate:

- (Argentina) Alex Barrena

The following players received entry from the qualifying draw:

- (Croatia) Matej Dodig
- (Germany) Rudolf Molleker
- (Brazil) Thiago Monteiro
- (Czech Republic) Maxim Mrva
- (Czech Republic) Dominik Reček
- (Argentina) Juan Bautista Torres

The following player received entry as a lucky loser:

- (Germany) Marko Topo

== Champions ==
=== Singles ===
- (Germany) Tom Gentzsch def. (Switzerland) Jérôme Kym 6–4, 7–6^{(7–4)}.

=== Doubles ===
- (Croatia) Admir Kalender / (Croatia) Nino Serdarušić def. (United Kingdom) Finn Bass / (Netherlands) Jarno Jans 6–4, 3–6, [13–11].
