= Tom Gentzsch =

German tennis player (born 2003)

- Gentzsch at the 2026 Wimbledon Championships
- Country (sports): Germany
- Born: 5 September 2003 (age 23) Duisburg, Germany
- Height: 1.91 m (6 ft 3 in)
- Plays: Right-handed (two-handed backhand)
- Coach: Jan Velthuis, Martin Gentzsch
- Prize money: US $352,098

Singles
- Career record: 0–1 (at ATP Tour level, Grand Slam level, and in Davis Cup)
- Career titles: 1 Challenger, 7 ITF
- Highest ranking: No. 145 (10 August 2026)
- Current ranking: No. 164 (5 October 2026)

Grand Slam singles results
- French Open: Q3 (2026)
- Wimbledon: Q2 (2026)
- US Open: Q2 (2026)

Doubles
- Career record: 0–0 (at ATP Tour level, Grand Slam level, and in Davis Cup)
- Career titles: 1 ITF
- Highest ranking: No. 681 (5 May 2025)
- Last updated on: 15 October 2026.

Tom Gentzsch (born 5 September 2003) is a German tennis player. He has a career-high ATP singles ranking of world No. 145 achieved on 10 August 2026 and a best doubles ranking of No. 681 attained on 5 May 2025.

== Career ==
Gentzsch made his ATP main draw debut at the 2026 Stuttgart Open after receiving a wildcard for the singles main draw.

Gentzsch won his maiden Challenger title at the 2026 Platzmann Open after defeating Jérôme Kym in the final. As a result he reached the top 150 in the singles rankings on 10 August 2026.

== Singles performance timeline ==
Key
W	F	SF	QF	#R	RR	Q#	DNQ	A	NH

(W) winner; (F) finalist; (SF) semifinalist; (QF) quarterfinalist; (#R) rounds 4, 3, 2, 1; (RR) round-robin stage; (Q#) qualification round; (DNQ) did not qualify; (A) absent; (NH) not held; (SR) strike rate (events won / competed); (W–L) win–loss record.
To avoid confusion and double counting, these charts are updated at the conclusion of a tournament or when the player's participation has ended.

Current through the 2026 US Open qualifying.

Tournament	2026	SR	W–L
Grand Slam tournaments
Australian Open	A	0 / 0	0–0
French Open	Q3	0 / 0	0–0
Wimbledon	Q2	0 / 0	0–0
US Open	Q2	0 / 0	0–0
Win–loss	0–0	0 / 0	0–0
Career statistics
Tournaments	1	1	
Overall win–loss	0–1	0–1	
Year-end ranking			

== ATP Challenger Tour finals ==
=== Singles: 4 (1 title, 3 runner-ups) ===
Finals by surface
Hard (0–1)
Clay (1–2)

Result	W–L	Date	Tournament	Surface	Opponent	Score
Loss	0–1	Feb 2026	Koblenz Open, Germany	Hard (i)	Pavel Kotov	4–6, 6–1, 6–7^{(8–10)}
Loss	0–2	Mar 2026	Split Open, Croatia	Clay	(Croatia) Mili Poljičak	4–6, 4–6
Loss	0–3	Jul 2026	Dutch Open, Netherlands	Clay	(Netherlands) Guy den Ouden	4–6, 6–4, 0–6
Win	1–3	Aug 2026	Platzmann Open, Germany	Clay	(Switzerland) Jérôme Kym	6–4, 7–6^{(7–4)}
