= Guy den Ouden =

Dutch tennis player (born 2002)

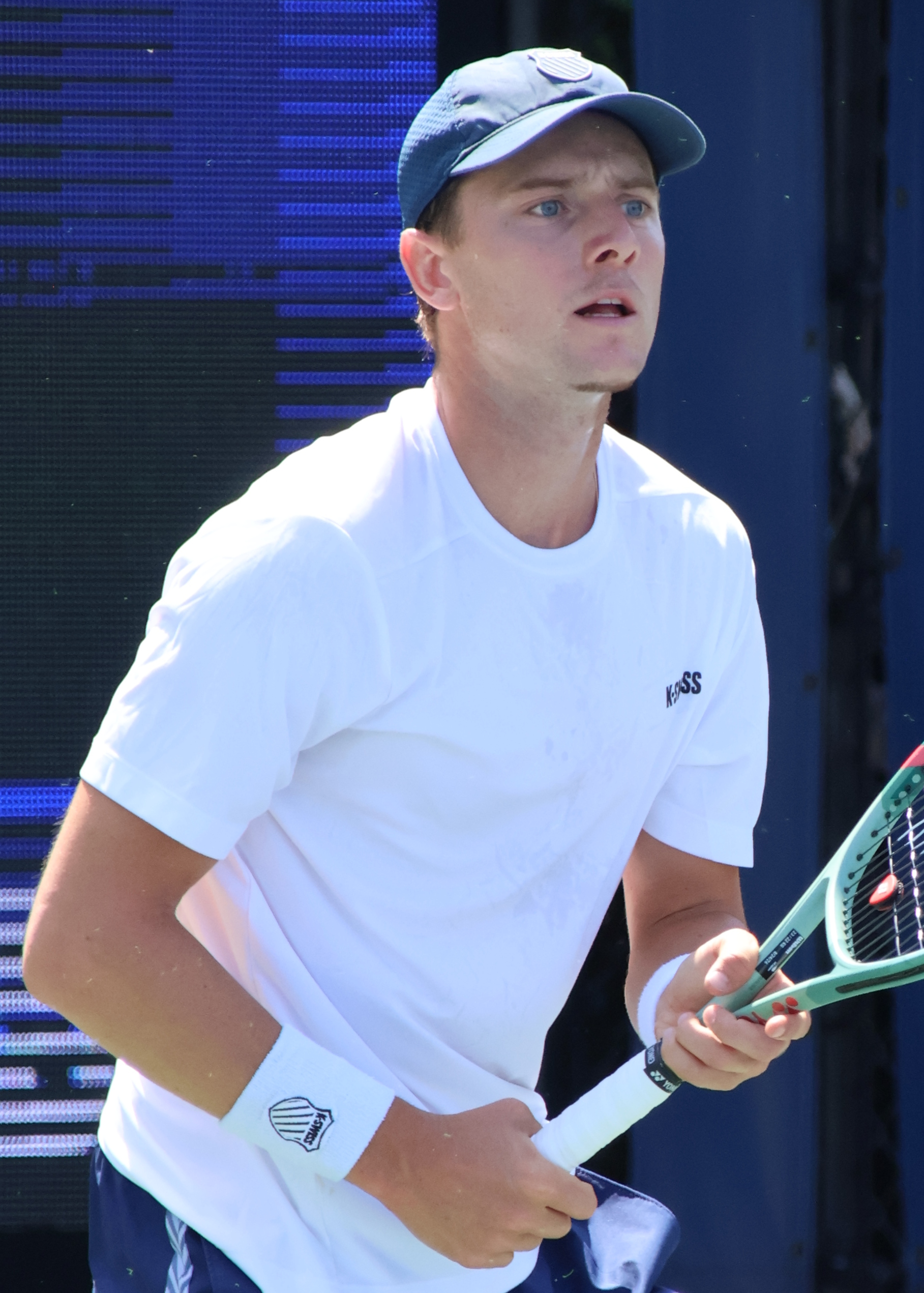
- Den Ouden at the 2026 US Open
- Country (sports): Netherlands
- Born: 8 April 2002 (age 24) Maarssen, Netherlands
- Height: 1.83 m (6 ft 0 in)
- Plays: Right-handed, (two-handed backhand)
- College: Pepperdine University
- Coach: Marcel Vos, Laszlo Toth
- Prize money: US$418,503

Singles
- Career record: 2–2
- Career titles: 0
- Highest ranking: No. 147 (8 September 2025)
- Current ranking: No. 213 (31 August 2026)

Grand Slam singles results
- Australian Open: Q1 (2026)
- French Open: Q1 (2025, 2026)
- Wimbledon: Q1 (2025, 2026)
- US Open: Q1 (2025, 2026)

Doubles
- Career record: 0–0
- Career titles: 0
- Highest ranking: No. 540 (2 May 2022)
- Last updated on: 1 September 2026.

Guy den Ouden (born 8 April 2002) is a Dutch professional tennis player. He has a career-high singles ranking of world No. 147 achieved on 8 September 2025 and a doubles ranking of No. 540 achieved on 2 May 2022. He is currently the No. 4 player from the Netherlands.

In 2020 and 2021, den Ouden attended Pepperdine University in California.

== Early life ==
Guy den Ouden was born in Maarssen, in the middle of the Netherlands, in the province of Utrecht. He is the son of Arnoud and Anne Den Ouden, who were both keen tennis players. He played football at VV Maarssen before concentrating on tennis. He trained at the National Tennis Center with senior pros such as Botic van de Zandschulp, Robin Haase and Jesper de Jong and became Dutch champion at U16 and U18 level.

== Career ==
=== 2020-2022: Juniors, Pro Tour debuts ===
As a junior, he reached the semifinals at the 2020 French Open – Boys' singles. He was the first Dutch person to have achieved this since Thiemo de Bakker in 2006. His run included a win over the second seed and 2020 Australian Open - Boys' singles finalist Arthur Cazaux.

In 2022, den Ouden won five ITF tournaments and his ranking climbed inside the top 500 for the first time, before being sidelined by injury. Upon his return he was chosen as a training partner for the Dutch Davis Cup team.

=== 2023-2025: Maiden Challenger title, top 150 ===
In June 2023, den Ouden won an ITF tournament in Aarhus, Denmark. The following month he was a finalist at a tournament in The Hague, Netherlands. In November 2023, den Ouden defeated Arthur Géa to win an ITF Futures hardcourt tournament in Heraklion.

In February 2024, he was given a wildcard into qualifying for the 2024 ABN AMRO Open in Rotterdam where he lost to alternate Pablo Llamas Ruiz. In September 2024, den Ouden won his maiden title at the 2024 Izida Cup II in Dobrich, Bulgaria, where he faced compatriot Jelle Sels, defeating him in straight sets. As a result, he made his top 300 debut on 16 September 2024.

Following his second final at the 2025 Rwanda Challenger II, a semifinal and a final at the ITF tournaments in Santa Margherita di Pula, den Ouden reached the top 250 in the rankings on 21 April 2025. Following another Challenger final at the 2025 Advantage Cars Prague Open, den Ouden reached the top 200 at No. 187 on 19 May 2025. He won his second title on the Challenger Tour in Porto in September 2025 and moved into the top 150 of the world rankings for the first time.

== Performance timeline ==
Key
W	F	SF	QF	#R	RR	Q#	DNQ	A	NH

(W) winner; (F) finalist; (SF) semifinalist; (QF) quarterfinalist; (#R) rounds 4, 3, 2, 1; (RR) round-robin stage; (Q#) qualification round; (DNQ) did not qualify; (A) absent; (NH) not held; (SR) strike rate (events won / competed); (W–L) win–loss record.
To avoid confusion and double counting, these charts are updated at the conclusion of a tournament or when the player's participation has ended.

=== Singles ===
Tournament	2025	2026	SR	W–L	Win %
Grand Slam tournaments
Australian Open	A	Q1	0 / 0	0–0	–
French Open	Q1		0 / 0	0–0	–
Wimbledon	Q1		0 / 0	0–0	–
US Open	Q1		0 / 0	0–0	–
Win–loss	0–0	0–0	0 / 0	0–0	–
ATP Masters 1000
Indian Wells Masters	A		0 / 0	0–0	–
Miami Open	A		0 / 0	0–0	–
Monte Carlo Masters	A		0 / 0	0–0	–
Madrid Open	A		0 / 0	0-0	–
Italian Open	A		0 / 0	0–0	–
Canadian Open	A		0 / 0	0–0	–
Cincinnati Masters	A		0 / 0	0–0	–
Shanghai Masters	A		0 / 0	0–0	–
Paris Masters	A		0 / 0	0–0	–
Win–loss	0–0	0–0	0 / 0	0–0	–

== ATP Challenger Tour finals ==
=== Singles: 7 (3 titles, 4 runner-ups) ===
Legend ATP Challenger Tour (3–4)	Finals by surface Hard (0–0) Clay (3–4)

Result	W–L	Date	Tournament	Tier	Surface	Opponent	Score
Win	1–0	Sep 2024	Izida Cup II, Bulgaria	Challenger	Clay	(Netherlands) Jelle Sels	6–2, 6–3
Loss	1–1	Mar 2025	Rwanda Challenger II, Rwanda	Challenger	Clay	(France) Valentin Royer	2–6, 4–6
Loss	1–2	May 2025	Prague Open, Czech Republic	Challenger	Clay	(Austria) Filip Misolic	4–6, 0–6
Loss	1–3	Jun 2025	Neckarcup, Germany	Challenger	Clay	(Peru) Ignacio Buse	5–7, 5–7
Loss	1–4	Jul 2025	Platzmann Open, Germany	Challenger	Clay	(Germany) Yannick Hanfmann	6–3, 2–6, 2–6
Win	2–4	Aug 2025	CT Porto Cup, Portugal	Challenger	Clay	(Belgium) Gilles-Arnaud Bailly	6–4, 6–2
Win	3–4	Jul 2026	Dutch Open, Netherlands	Challenger	Clay	(Germany) Tom Gentzsch	6–4, 4–6, 6–0
