= Duje Ajduković =

Croatian tennis player (born 2001)

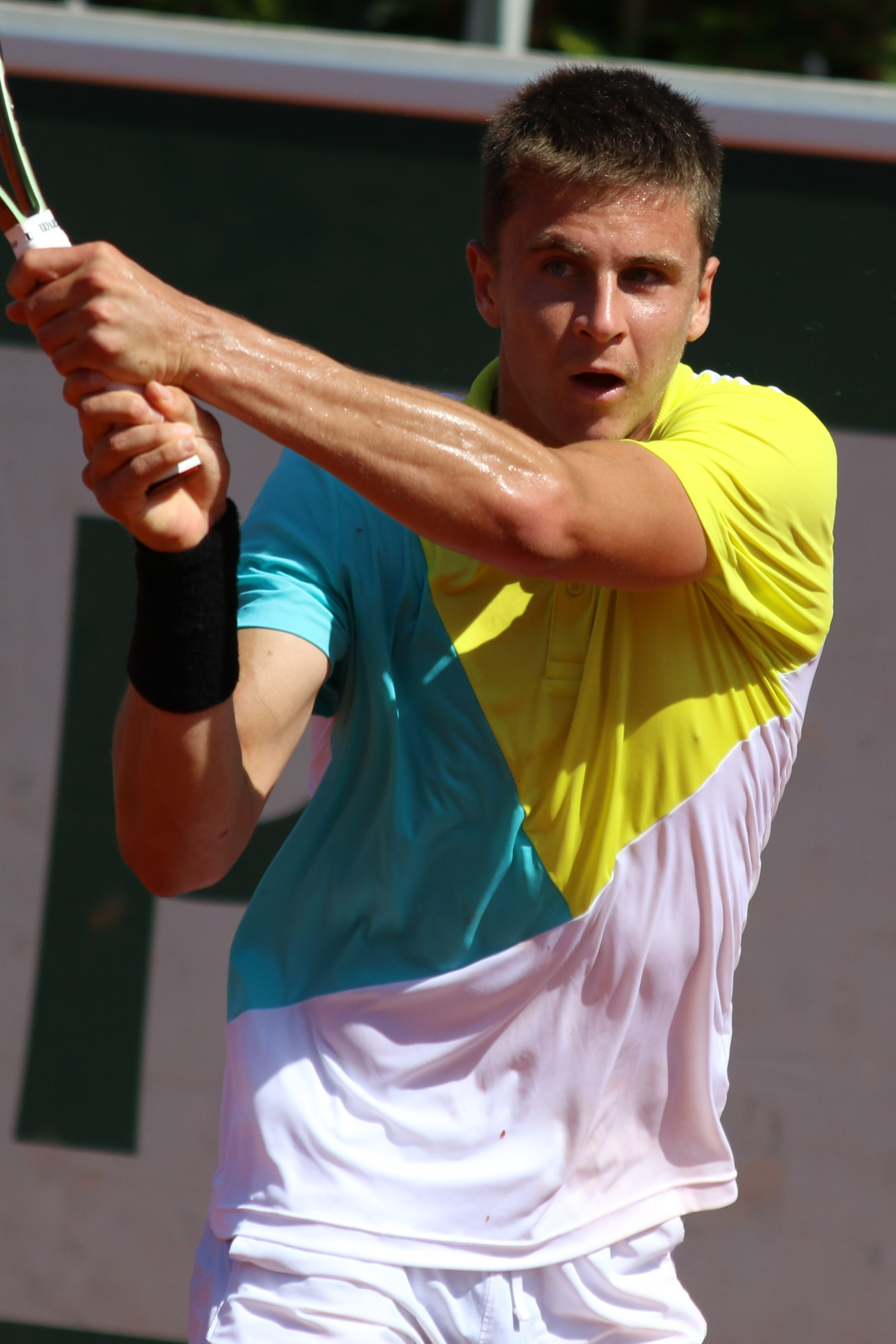
- Ajduković at the 2022 French Open
- Country (sports): Croatia
- Residence: Zagreb, Croatia
- Born: 5 February 2001 (age 25) Split, Croatia
- Height: 1.88 m (6 ft 2 in)
- Turned pro: 2018
- Plays: Right-handed (two-handed backhand)
- Coach: Frane Ninčević
- Prize money: US$712,528

Singles
- Career record: 7–10 (at ATP Tour level, Grand Slam level, and in Davis Cup)
- Career titles: 0
- Highest ranking: No. 105 (9 September 2024)
- Current ranking: No. 289 (25 May 2026)

Grand Slam singles results
- Australian Open: Q2 (2024, 2025)
- French Open: Q2 (2022, 2024)
- Wimbledon: Q3 (2022)
- US Open: Q2 (2024)

Doubles
- Career record: 1–1 (at ATP Tour level, Grand Slam level, and in Davis Cup)
- Career titles: 0
- Highest ranking: No. 491 (8 November 2021)
- Current ranking: No. 874 (25 May 2026)
- Last updated on: 25 May 2026.

Duje Ajduković (born 5 February 2001) is a Croatian tennis player. He has a career-high ATP singles ranking of world No. 105, achieved on 9 September 2024 and a doubles ranking of No. 491, achieved on 8 November 2021. He is currently the No. 6 player from Croatia.

== Professional career ==
=== 2021: ATP debut and first win ===
Ajduković made his ATP main draw debut at the 2021 Croatia Open Umag after receiving a wildcard in singles and in the doubles main draws and recorded his first ATP singles win over qualifier Andrea Collarini.

=== 2023: First Challenger title ===
In August 2023, Ajdukovic won his first ATP Challenger title in Lüdenscheid, Germany after going through the qualifying, defeating Hugo Dellien in the final in straight sets.

=== 2024: ATP semifinal, ATP 500 and top 105 debuts ===
He reached a new career high of No. 115 on 1 April 2024. He qualified for his first ATP 500 tournament at the 2024 Barcelona Open Banc Sabadell. He reached his first semifinal as a qualifier at the 2024 Swedish Open in Bastad, defeating Luca Van Assche, eight seed Pavel Kotov and Thiago Monteiro. He lost to Rafael Nadal in three sets. As a result, he reached the top 110 in the rankings on 22 July 2024. Following his second Challenger title in Manacor, after a win over Matteo Gigante in the final, he reached the top 105 in the rankings on 9 September 2024.

== ATP Challenger Tour finals ==
=== Singles: 6 (3 titles, 3 runner-ups) ===
Legend ATP Challenger Tour (3–3)	Finals by surface Hard (2–1) Clay (1–2)

Result	W–L	Date	Tournament	Tier	Surface	Opponent	Score
Win	1–0	July 2023	Platzmann-Sauerland Open, Germany	Challenger	Clay	(Bolivia) Hugo Dellien	7–5, 6–4
Loss	1–1	Sep 2023	Braga Open, Portugal	Challenger	Clay	(Spain) Oriol Roca Batalla	6–4, 1–6, 1–6
Win	2–1	Nov 2023	Kobe Challenger, Japan	Challenger	Hard (i)	(Japan) Sho Shimabukuro	6–4, 6–2
Loss	2–2	Jan 2024	Open Quimper Bretagne, France	Challenger	Hard (i)	(France) Pierre-Hugues Herbert	3–6, 2–6
Win	3–2	Aug 2024	Rafa Nadal Open, Spain	Challenger	Hard	(Italy) Matteo Gigante	4–6, 6–3, 6–4
Loss	3–3	Aug 2025	Como Challenger, Italy	Challenger	Clay	(Croatia) Luka Mikrut	3–6, 5–7

== ITF Futures/World Tennis Tour finals ==
=== Singles: 10 (11 titles, 4 runner-ups) ===
Legend ITF Futures/WTT (7–4)	Finals by surface Hard (0–1) Clay (7–3)

Result	W–L	Date	Tournament	Tier	Surface	Opponent	Score
Loss	0–1	Oct 2018	Tunisia F34, Monastir	Futures	Hard	(France) Baptiste Crepatte	7–5, 6–7^{(3–7)}, 2–6
Loss	0–2	Sep 2019	M15 Székesfehérvár, Hungary	WTT	Clay	(Czech Republic) Michael Vrbenský	2–6, 2–6
Win	1–2	Oct 2019	M15 Tabarka, Tunisia	WTT	Clay	(Spain) Pol Toledo Bagué	6–3, 6–1
Win	2–2	Nov 2019	M15 Antalya, Turkey	WTT	Clay	(Spain) Álvaro López San Martín	6–2, 6–4
Win	3–2	Mar 2020	M25 Antalya, Turkey	WTT	Clay	(Argentina) Pedro Cachín	3–6, 6–4, 7–6^{(7–2)}
Win	4–2	Sep 2020	M15 Curtea de Argeș, Romania	WTT	Clay	(Italy) Franco Agamenone	2–6, 6–4, 6–4
Win	5–2	Apr 2023	M25 Dubrovnik, Croatia	WTT	Clay	(Croatia) Luka Mikrut	6–3, 6–2
Win	6–2	Apr 2023	M25 Split, Croatia	WTT	Clay	(Ukraine) Eric Vanshelboim	6–3, 6–4
Loss	6–3	Apr 2023	M15 Kuršumlijska Banja, Serbia	WTT	Clay	(Poland) Maks Kaśnikowski	4–6, 6–7^{(3–7)}
Win	7–3	Jun 2023	M25 Kiseljak, Bosnia and Herzegovina	WTT	Clay	(Brazil) Pedro Boscardin Dias	6–2, 7–5
Loss	7–4	May 2026	M25 Bol, Croatia	WTT	Clay	(Croatia) Noa Vukadin	6–2, 5–7, 3–6

=== Doubles: 3 (2 titles, 1 runner-up) ===
Legend ITF Futures/WTT (2–1)

Result	W–L	Date	Tournament	Tier	Surface	Partner	Opponents	Score
Loss	0–1	Oct 2018	Tunisia F34, Monastir	Futures	Hard	(Greece) Petros Tsitsipas	(Brazil) Bernardo A. Pereira e Oliveira (Germany) Robert Strombachs	4–6, 7–6^{(8–6)}, [6–10]
Win	1–1	Nov 2019	M15 Antalya, Turkey	WTT	Clay	(Croatia) Karlo Kranić	(Romania) Dragoș Dima (Romania) Mircea-Alexandru Jecan	6–3, 3–6, [10–6]
Win	2–1	Dec 2019	M15 Antalya, Turkey	WTT	Clay	(Serbia) Miljan Zekić	(Russia) Vladimir Korolev (Russia) Andrey Uvarov	6–3, 6–3

== National representation ==
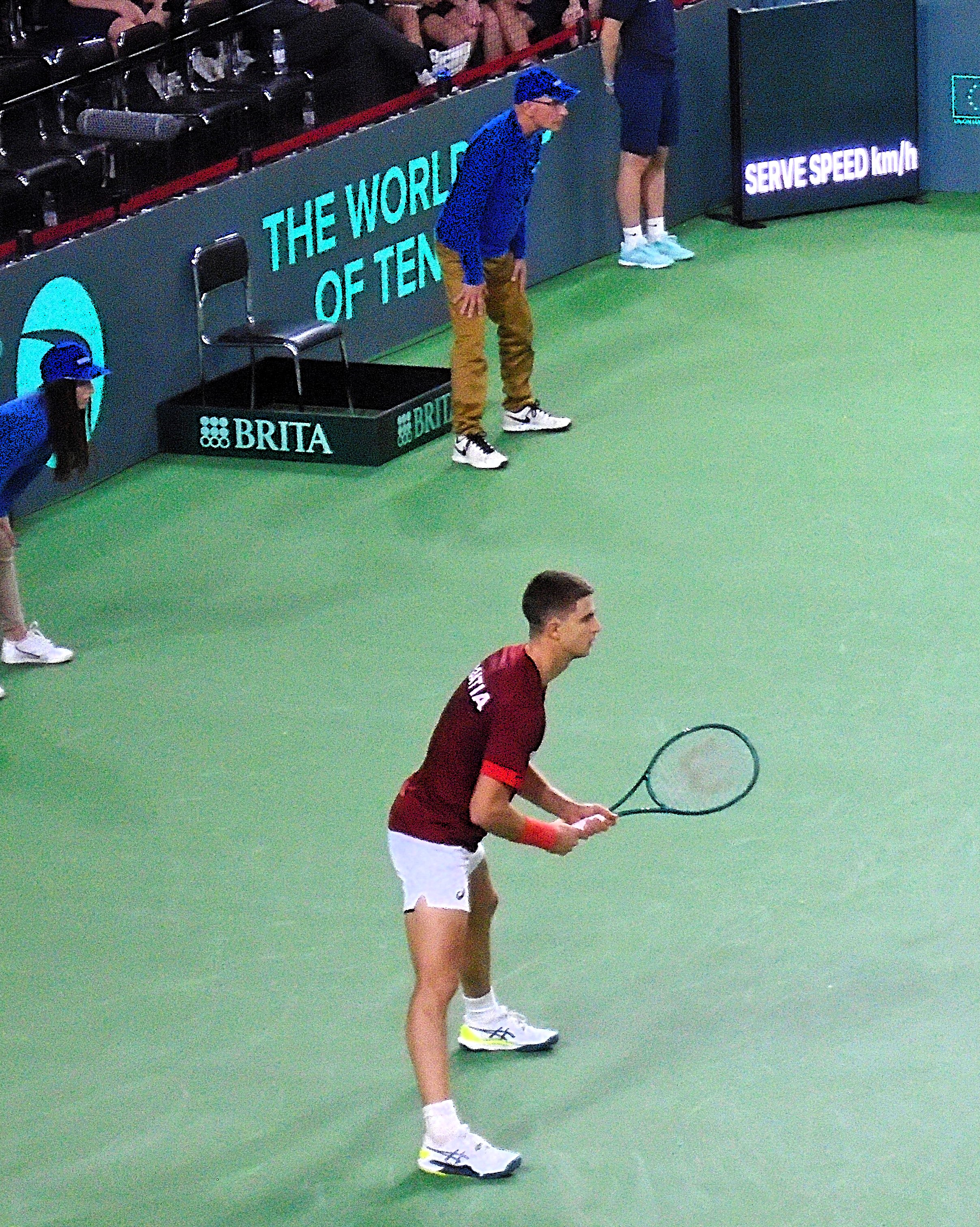
Ajduković at the 2024 Davis Cup in Varaždin

=== Davis Cup (0–1) ===
Group membership Finals (0–1) Qualifying Round (0–0)	Matches by surface Hard (0–1) Clay (0–0) Grass (0–0)	Matches by type Singles (0–1) Doubles (0–0)	Matches by venue Home (0–1) Away (0–0) Neutral (0–0)

- ▲ ▼ indicates the outcome of the Davis Cup match followed by the score, date, place of event, the zonal classification and its phase, and the court surface.

Result	No.	Rubber	Match type (partner if any)	Opponent nation	Opponent player(s)	Score
▲2–1; 17 September 2023; Arena Gripe, Split, Croatia; Davis Cup Final Group D round robin; hard (indoor) surface
Defeat	1	I	Singles	Netherlands	Botic van de Zandschulp	3–6, 6–3, 5–7
