= Platzmann Open =

- 2026 Platzmann Open

ATP Challenger Tour
- Event name: Platzmann Open
- Location: Hagen (2025-), Lüdenscheid, Germany (2021-2024)
- Venue: TC Rot-Weiß Hagen (2025-)
- Category: ATP Challenger Tour (2025), Challenger 100 (-2024, 2026-)
- Surface: Clay
- Draw: 32S/16D
- Prize money: €160,680 (2026), €120,950 (2024)
- Website: website

The Platzmann Open is a professional tennis tournament played on clay courts. It is currently part of the ATP Challenger Tour and is held in Hagen, Germany. It was previously held in Lüdenscheid, Germany from 2021 until 2024. It was upgraded back to a Challenger 100 event in 2026.

== Past finals ==
=== Singles ===
Year	Champion	Runner-up	Score
2026	(Germany) Tom Gentzsch	(Switzerland) Jérôme Kym	6–4, 7–6^{(7–4)}
2025	(Germany) Yannick Hanfmann	(Netherlands) Guy den Ouden	3–6, 6–2, 6–2
2024	(Belgium) Raphaël Collignon	(Netherlands) Botic van de Zandschulp	3–6, 6–4, 6–3
2023	(Croatia) Duje Ajduković	(Bolivia) Hugo Dellien	7–5, 6–4
2022	(Serbia) Hamad Međedović	(China) Zhang Zhizhen	6–1, 6–2
2021	(Germany) Daniel Altmaier	(Chile) Nicolás Jarry	7–6^{(7–1)}, 4–6, 6–3

=== Doubles ===
Year	Champions	Runners-up	Score
2026	(Croatia) Admir Kalender (Croatia) Nino Serdarušić	(United Kingdom) Finn Bass (Netherlands) Jarno Jans	6–4, 3–6, [13–11]
2025	(Germany) Hendrik Jebens (France) Albano Olivetti	(United States) Vasil Kirkov (Netherlands) Bart Stevens	6–4, 6–7^{(2–7)}, [10–8]
2024	(Netherlands) David Pel (Netherlands) Bart Stevens	(Netherlands) Matwé Middelkoop (Ukraine) Denys Molchanov	6–4, 2–6, [10–8]
2023	(Switzerland) Luca Margaroli (Argentina) Santiago Rodríguez Taverna	(Germany) Jakob Schnaitter (Germany) Kai Wehnelt	7–6^{(7–4)}, 6–4
2022	(Netherlands) Robin Haase (Netherlands) Sem Verbeek	(Germany) Fabian Fallert (Germany) Hendrik Jebens	6–2, 5–7, [10–3]
2021	(Croatia) Ivan Sabanov (Croatia) Matej Sabanov	(Ukraine) Denys Molchanov (Kazakhstan) Aleksandr Nedovyesov	6–4, 2–6, [12–10]
