= 2024 Bahrain Ministry of Interior Tennis Challenger – Doubles =

Doubles
- 2024 Bahrain Ministry of Interior Tennis Challenger

Final
- Champions: (Spain) Sergio Martos Gornés (Greece) Petros Tsitsipas
- Runners-up: (United States) Vasil Kirkov (Finland) Patrik Niklas-Salminen
- Score: 3–6, 6–3, [10–8]

Events
Singles	Doubles
- Bahrain Ministry of Interior Tennis Challenger

Patrik Niklas-Salminen and Bart Stevens were the defending champions but only Niklas-Salminen chose to defend his title, partnering Vasil Kirkov. Niklas-Salminen lost in the final to Sergio Martos Gornés and Petros Tsitsipas.

Martos Gornés and Tsitsipas won the title after defeating Kirkov and Niklas-Salminen 3–6, 6–3, [10–8] in the final.

== Seeds ==
1. (United Kingdom) Luke Johnson / (Tunisia) Skander Mansouri (semifinals)
2. (Spain) Sergio Martos Gornés / (Greece) Petros Tsitsipas (champions)
3. (Czech Republic) Roman Jebavý / (Spain) David Vega Hernández (first round)
4. (United States) Vasil Kirkov / (Finland) Patrik Niklas-Salminen (final)

== Draw ==
Key

- Q = Qualifier
- WC = Wild card
- LL = Lucky loser
- Alt = Alternate
- ITF = ITF entry
- PR = Protected ranking
- SR = Special ranking
- SE = Special exempt
- JE = Junior exempt
- JR = Junior Accelerator Programme entrant
- CO = College Accelerator Programme entrant
- NG = Next Gen Accelerator Program entrant
- w/o = Walkover
- r = Retired
- d = Defaulted

First round
1	(United Kingdom) L Johnson (Tunisia) S Mansouri	6	6
(Serbia) I Sabanov (Serbia) M Sabanov	3	2
WC	(Australia) Anthony Popyrin (Bahrain) Y Qaed	2	1
(Switzerland) M-A Hüsler (Switzerland) A Ritschard	6	6
4	(United States) V Kirkov (Finland) P Niklas-Salminen	6	4	[10]
(Switzerland) L Margaroli (Portugal) G Oliveira	4	6	[8]
Alt	(Spain) D Rincón (Jordan) A Shelbayh	7^{7}	6^{5}	[10]
(Bosnia and Herzegovina) D Džumhur (Bosnia and Herzegovina) N Fatić	6^{1}	7^{7}	[3]
WC	(India) Sathi Reddy Chirala (Italy) F Fognini	1	3
(Italy) M Bortolotti (Italy) A Giannessi	6	6
(Tunisia) A Dougaz (Czech Republic) D Svrčina	6	2	[10]
3	(Czech Republic) R Jebavý (Spain) D Vega Hernández	2	6	[5]
(Japan) T Matsui (Japan) K Uesugi	6^{2}	6	[11]
(Sweden) F Bergevi (Netherlands) M Veldheer	7^{7}	3	[9]
(United Kingdom) B Harris (Germany) R Molleker	2	7^{7}	[7]
2	(Spain) S Martos Gornés (Greece) Pe Tsitsipas	6	6^{2}	[10]

Quarterfinals
1	(United Kingdom) L Johnson (Tunisia) S Mansouri	w/o
(Switzerland) M-A Hüsler (Switzerland) A Ritschard
4	(United States) V Kirkov (Finland) P Niklas-Salminen	w/o
Alt	(Spain) D Rincón (Jordan) A Shelbayh
(Italy) M Bortolotti (Italy) A Giannessi	6	6
(Tunisia) A Dougaz (Czech Republic) D Svrčina	3	4
(Japan) T Matsui (Japan) K Uesugi	4	3
2	(Spain) S Martos Gornés (Greece) Pe Tsitsipas	6	6

Semifinals
1	(United Kingdom) L Johnson (Tunisia) S Mansouri	6	1	[9]
4	(United States) V Kirkov (Finland) P Niklas-Salminen	3	6	[11]
(Italy) M Bortolotti (Italy) A Giannessi	4	1
2	(Spain) S Martos Gornés (Greece) Pe Tsitsipas	6	6

Final
4	(United States) V Kirkov (Finland) P Niklas-Salminen	6	3	[8]
2	(Spain) S Martos Gornés (Greece) Pe Tsitsipas	3	6	[10]
