= 2023 Bahrain Ministry of Interior Tennis Challenger – Singles =

Singles
- 2023 Bahrain Ministry of Interior Tennis Challenger

Final
- Champion: (Australia) Thanasi Kokkinakis
- Runner-up: (Jordan) Abedallah Shelbayh
- Score: 6–1, 6–4

Events
Singles	Doubles
← 2021 ·	Bahrain Ministry of Interior Tennis Challenger	· 2024 →

Ramkumar Ramanathan was the defending champion but chose not to defend his title.

Thanasi Kokkinakis won the title after defeating Abedallah Shelbayh 6–1, 6–4 in the final. Shelbayh became the first Jordanian player to reach a final on the Challenger tour.

== Seeds ==
1. (Australia) Jason Kubler (quarterfinals)
2. (Australia) Alexei Popyrin (quarterfinals)
3. (Australia) Christopher O'Connell (second round)
4. (Italy) Francesco Passaro (second round)
5. (Italy) Matteo Arnaldi (first round)
6. (Czech Republic) Tomáš Macháč (quarterfinals)
7. Pavel Kotov (first round)
8. (Australia) Thanasi Kokkinakis (champion)

== Draw ==
=== Key ===
- Q = Qualifier
- WC = Wild card
- LL = Lucky loser
- Alt = Alternate
- SE = Special exempt
- PR = Protected ranking
- ITF = ITF entry
- JE = Junior exempt
- w/o = Walkover
- r = Retired
- d = Defaulted
- SR = Special ranking

=== Finals ===
Semifinals
WC	(Jordan) Abedallah Shelbayh	7	6
LL	(Italy) Salvatore Caruso	5	2
(Germany) Jan-Lennard Struff	4	7^{7}	1
8	(Australia) Thanasi Kokkinakis	6	6^{3}	6

Final
WC	(Jordan) Abedallah Shelbayh	1	4
8	(Australia) Thanasi Kokkinakis	6	6

=== Top half ===
First round
1	(Australia) J Kubler	5	6	7^{13}
SE	(Italy) S Travaglia	7	1	6^{11}
WC	(Bahrain) Y Qaed	1	3
(Poland) D Michalski	6	6
WC	Bekkhan Atlangeriev	2	3
WC	(Jordan) A Shelbayh	6	6
(Czech Republic) V Kopřiva	6	6
7	P Kotov	2	1
4	(Italy) F Passaro	6	6
(Japan) K Uchida	1	4
(Italy) L Giustino	6	6
Q	(Egypt) M Safwat	4	4
(Romania) FC Jianu	6^{3}	7^{7}	6^{3}
(Czech Republic) M Gengel	7^{7}	6^{2}	7^{7}
LL	(Italy) S Caruso	3	6	6
5	(Italy) M Arnaldi	6	3	2

Second round
1	(Australia) J Kubler	6	6
(Poland) D Michalski	3	3
WC	(Jordan) A Shelbayh	6	3	6
(Czech Republic) V Kopřiva	4	6	3
4	(Italy) F Passaro	5	3
(Italy) L Giustino	7	6
(Czech Republic) M Gengel	1	2
LL	(Italy) S Caruso	6	6

Quarterfinals
1	(Australia) J Kubler	2	7	6^{2}
WC	(Jordan) A Shelbayh	6	5	7^{7}
(Italy) L Giustino	5	2
LL	(Italy) S Caruso	7	6

Semifinals
WC	(Jordan) A Shelbayh	7	6
LL	(Italy) S Caruso	5	2

=== Bottom half ===
First round
6	(Czech Republic) T Macháč	6	2	6
(Italy) A Giannessi	2	6	2
LL	(Northern Mariana Islands) C Sinclair	7^{7}	2	6
Q	(Italy) A Arnaboldi	6^{3}	6	3
(Germany) J-L Struff	6	6
LL	Andrey Chepelev	2	2
(Austria) M Neuchrist	4	4
3	(Australia) C O'Connell	6	6
8	(Australia) T Kokkinakis	7	6
Q	(Turkey) Y Erel	5	1
(France) A Müller	6	6
Alt	(Spain) O Roca Batalla	3	1
Q	(Norway) V Durasovic	6^{6}	6	7
Q	(Ukraine) Aleksandr Braynin	7^{8}	1	5
(Finland) O Virtanen	5	2
2	(Australia) A Popyrin	7	6

Second round
6	(Czech Republic) T Macháč	6	6
LL	(Northern Mariana Islands) C Sinclair	0	2
(Germany) J-L Struff	6	7^{7}
3	(Australia) C O'Connell	1	6^{1}
8	(Australia) T Kokkinakis	6	4	6
(France) A Müller	4	6	4
Q	(Norway) V Durasovic	6	1	4
2	(Australia) A Popyrin	1	6	6

Quarterfinals
6	(Czech Republic) T Macháč	4	3
(Germany) J-L Struff	6	6
8	(Australia) T Kokkinakis	6	7^{7}
2	(Australia) A Popyrin	3	6^{5}

Semifinals
(Germany) J-L Struff	4	7^{7}	1
8	(Australia) T Kokkinakis	6	6^{3}	6
