= 2025 Bahrain Ministry of Interior Tennis Challenger – Doubles =

Doubles
- 2025 Bahrain Ministry of Interior Tennis Challenger

Final
- Champions: (Ukraine) Vitaliy Sachko (Kazakhstan) Beibit Zhukayev
- Runners-up: Ivan Liutarevich (France) Luca Sanchez
- Score: 6–4, 6–0

Events
Singles	Doubles
- Bahrain Ministry of Interior Tennis Challenger

This page describes the results of the 2025 Bahrain Ministry of Interior Tennis Challenger.

Sergio Martos Gornés and Petros Tsitsipas were the defending champions but only Martos Gornés chose to defend his title, partnering Victor Vlad Cornea. They lost in the quarterfinals to Vitaliy Sachko and Beibit Zhukayev.

Sachko and Zhukayev won the title after defeating Ivan Liutarevich and Luca Sanchez 6–4, 6–0 in the final.

== Seeds ==
1. (Romania) Victor Vlad Cornea / (Spain) Sergio Martos Gornés (quarterfinals)
2. (India) Jeevan Nedunchezhiyan / (India) Vijay Sundar Prashanth (semifinals)
3. (United States) Vasil Kirkov / (Netherlands) Bart Stevens (semifinals)
4. (Australia) Blake Bayldon / (Australia) Matthew Romios (first round)

== Draw ==
Key

- Q = Qualifier
- WC = Wild card
- LL = Lucky loser
- Alt = Alternate
- ITF = ITF entry
- PR = Protected ranking
- SR = Special ranking
- SE = Special exempt
- JE = Junior exempt
- JR = Junior Accelerator Programme entrant
- CO = College Accelerator Programme entrant
- NG = Next Gen Accelerator Program entrant
- w/o = Walkover
- r = Retired
- d = Defaulted

=== Draw ===
First round
1	(Romania) V Cornea (Spain) S Martos Gornés	6	7^{7}
WC	(France) B Paire (Bahrain) Y Qaed	2	6^{5}
(China) F Sun (China) A Wang	3	5
(Ukraine) V Sachko (Kazakhstan) B Zhukayev	6	7
3	(United States) V Kirkov (Netherlands) B Stevens	6	7^{7}
(Colombia) N Mejía (Japan) Y Uchiyama	1	6^{3}
WC	(Norway) N Budkov Kjær (Norway) V Durasovic	5	6	[10]
Alt	(Bulgaria) A Andreev (Romania) FC Jianu	7	2	[7]
(India) A Chandrasekar (Chinese Taipei) R Ho	6^{4}	3
I Liutarevich (France) L Sanchez	7^{7}	6
(Philippines) FC Alcantara (Thailand) P Isaro	6	6
4	(Australia) B Bayldon (Australia) MC Romios	4	3
(Kazakhstan) M Kukushkin (United States) N Moreno de Alboran	4	2
(United Kingdom) C Broom (Tunisia) A Dougaz	6	6
PR	(India) S Myneni (Northern Mariana Islands) C Sinclair	4	6^{1}
2	(India) J Nedunchezhiyan (India) VS Prashanth	6	7^{7}

Quarterfinals
1	(Romania) V Cornea (Spain) S Martos Gornés	7^{7}	3	[4]
(Ukraine) V Sachko (Kazakhstan) B Zhukayev	6^{4}	6	[10]
3	(United States) V Kirkov (Netherlands) B Stevens	6	6
WC	(Norway) N Budkov Kjær (Norway) V Durasovic	1	3
I Liutarevich (France) L Sanchez	6	7
(Philippines) FC Alcantara (Thailand) P Isaro	2	5
(United Kingdom) C Broom (Tunisia) A Dougaz	6^{r}
2	(India) J Nedunchezhiyan (India) VS Prashanth	6

Semifinals
(Ukraine) V Sachko (Kazakhstan) B Zhukayev	7^{7}	6^{1}	[10]
3	(United States) V Kirkov (Netherlands) B Stevens	6^{4}	7^{7}	[4]
I Liutarevich (France) L Sanchez	6	7^{7}
2	(India) J Nedunchezhiyan (India) VS Prashanth	3	6^{5}

Final
(Ukraine) V Sachko (Kazakhstan) B Zhukayev	6	6
I Liutarevich (France) L Sanchez	4	0
