= 2021 Bahrain Ministry of Interior Tennis Challenger – Doubles =

Doubles
- 2021 Bahrain Ministry of Interior Tennis Challenger

Final
- Champions: (Portugal) Nuno Borges (Portugal) Francisco Cabral
- Runners-up: (Austria) Maximilian Neuchrist (Greece) Michail Pervolarakis
- Score: 7–5, 6–7^{(5–7)}, [10–8]

Events
Singles	Doubles
- Bahrain Ministry of Interior Tennis Challenger

This was the first edition of the tournament.

Nuno Borges and Francisco Cabral won the title after defeating Maximilian Neuchrist and Michail Pervolarakis 7–5, 6–7^{(5–7)}, [10–8] in the final.

== Seeds ==
1. (Austria) Alexander Erler / (Austria) Lucas Miedler (quarterfinals)
2. (India) Jeevan Nedunchezhiyan / (Portugal) Gonçalo Oliveira (first round)
3. (India) Sriram Balaji / (India) Divij Sharan (semifinals)
4. (India) Arjun Kadhe / (India) Ramkumar Ramanathan (semifinals)

== Draw ==
Key

- Q = Qualifier
- WC = Wild card
- LL = Lucky loser
- Alt = Alternate
- ITF = ITF entry
- PR = Protected ranking
- SR = Special ranking
- SE = Special exempt
- JE = Junior exempt
- JR = Junior Accelerator Programme entrant
- CO = College Accelerator Programme entrant
- NG = Next Gen Accelerator Program entrant
- w/o = Walkover
- r = Retired
- d = Defaulted

First round
1	(Austria) A Erler (Austria) L Miedler	7^{7}	6
(Croatia) D Ajduković (Bosnia and Herzegovina) N Fatić	6^{4}	1
PR	(Germany) J Härteis (Finland) P Niklas-Salminen	3	4
Alt	(Austria) M Neuchrist (Greece) M Pervolarakis	6	6
4	(India) A Kadhe (India) R Ramanathan	6	3
WC	(Saudi Arabia) O Ahmed (Saudi Arabia) S Alhogbani	0	1^{r}
(Moldova) A Cozbinov (Czech Republic) M Gengel	6	6
WC	(Spain) Iván Marrero Curbelo (Bahrain) Y Qaed	4	2
(Russia) I Gakhov (Russia) E Karlovskiy	4	3
(Chinese Taipei) Y-h Hsu (Uzbekistan) K Sultanov	6	6
WC	(Bahrain) A Abdulnabi (Bahrain) H Abdulnabi	1	0
3	(India) S Balaji (India) D Sharan	6	6
(Turkey) A Çelikbilek (Turkey) Y Erel	4	6^{5}
(France) G Blancaneaux (New Zealand) A Sitak	6	7^{7}
(Portugal) N Borges (Portugal) F Cabral	3	6	[10]
2	(India) J Nedunchezhiyan (Portugal) G Oliveira	6	2	[6]

Quarterfinals
1	(Austria) A Erler (Austria) L Miedler	6	4	[9]
Alt	(Austria) M Neuchrist (Greece) M Pervolarakis	2	6	[11]
4	(India) A Kadhe (India) R Ramanathan	6	6
(Moldova) A Cozbinov (Czech Republic) M Gengel	4	2
(Chinese Taipei) Y-h Hsu (Uzbekistan) K Sultanov	3	6^{4}
3	(India) S Balaji (India) D Sharan	6	7^{7}
(France) G Blancaneaux (New Zealand) A Sitak	4	0
(Portugal) N Borges (Portugal) F Cabral	6	6

Semifinals
Alt	(Austria) M Neuchrist (Greece) M Pervolarakis	6	1	[10]
4	(India) A Kadhe (India) R Ramanathan	3	6	[7]
3	(India) S Balaji (India) D Sharan	4	2
(Portugal) N Borges (Portugal) F Cabral	6	6

Final
Alt	(Austria) M Neuchrist (Greece) M Pervolarakis	5	7^{7}	[8]
(Portugal) N Borges (Portugal) F Cabral	7	6^{5}	[10]
