= 2025 Bahrain Ministry of Interior Tennis Challenger – Singles =

Singles
- 2025 Bahrain Ministry of Interior Tennis Challenger

Final
- Champion: (Hungary) Márton Fucsovics
- Runner-up: (Italy) Andrea Vavassori
- Score: 6–3, 6–7^{(3–7)}, 6–4

Events
Singles	Doubles
← 2024 ·	Bahrain Ministry of Interior Tennis Challenger	· 2026 →

Mikhail Kukushkin was the defending champion but lost in the second round to Andrea Vavassori.

Márton Fucsovics won the title after defeating Vavassori 6–3, 6–7^{(3–7)}, 6–4 in the final.

== Seeds ==
1. (Hungary) Márton Fucsovics (champion)
2. Pavel Kotov (first round)
3. (Netherlands) Jesper de Jong (second round)
4. (Kazakhstan) Mikhail Kukushkin (second round)
5. (Japan) Yasutaka Uchiyama (first round)
6. (Georgia (country)) Nikoloz Basilashvili (first round)
7. (Croatia) Duje Ajduković (quarterfinals)
8. (France) Térence Atmane (quarterfinals)

== Draw ==
Key

- Q = Qualifier
- WC = Wild card
- LL = Lucky loser
- Alt = Alternate
- ITF = ITF entry
- PR = Protected ranking
- SR = Special ranking
- SE = Special exempt
- JE = Junior exempt
- JR = Junior Accelerator Programme entrant
- CO = College Accelerator Programme entrant
- NG = Next Gen Accelerator Program entrant
- w/o = Walkover
- r = Retired
- d = Defaulted

=== Finals ===
Semifinals
1	(Hungary) Márton Fucsovics	6	6
Q	Marat Sharipov	2	1
WC	(Italy) Andrea Vavassori	6	4	6
(United States) Brandon Holt	4	6	4

Final
1	(Hungary) Márton Fucsovics	6	6^{3}	6
WC	(Italy) Andrea Vavassori	3	7^{7}	4

=== Top half ===
First round
1	(Hungary) M Fucsovics	6	6
(Colombia) N Mejía	1	1
Alt	(United Kingdom) C Broom	5	6	6^{3}
(Tunisia) A Dougaz	7	3	7^{7}
WC	(Norway) N Budkov Kjær	7	1
(Bulgaria) A Andreev	5	0^{r}
Alt	(Norway) V Durasovic	6	3	7^{8}
6	(Georgia (country)) N Basilashvili	3	6	6^{6}
3	(Netherlands) J de Jong	2	7^{7}	6
A Karatsev	6	6^{2}	2
Q	M Sharipov	6	7^{7}
(Kazakhstan) B Zhukayev	4	6^{4}
(Romania) FC Jianu	6^{4}	6	6
Q	P Bar Biryukov	7^{7}	0	3
(France) C Lestienne	6	4	6^{4}
7	(Croatia) D Ajduković	4	6	7^{7}

Second round
1	(Hungary) M Fucsovics	6	6
(Tunisia) A Dougaz	2	3
WC	(Norway) N Budkov Kjær	6^{5}	2
Alt	(Norway) V Durasovic	7^{7}	6
3	(Netherlands) J de Jong	3	4
Q	M Sharipov	6	6
(Romania) FC Jianu	1	6	5
7	(Croatia) D Ajduković	6	2	7

Quarterfinals
1	(Hungary) M Fucsovics	6	7
Alt	(Norway) V Durasovic	4	5
Q	M Sharipov	4	7^{7}	7^{7}
7	(Croatia) D Ajduković	6	6^{4}	6^{1}

Semifinals
1	(Hungary) M Fucsovics	6	6
Q	M Sharipov	2	1

=== Bottom half ===
First round
5	(Japan) Y Uchiyama	6^{2}	4
Q	I Simakin	7^{7}	6
(Canada) A Galarneau	7^{7}	6^{7}	6
(Kazakhstan) D Yevseyev	6^{1}	7^{9}	3
Q	(Bulgaria) D Kuzmanov	3	6	3
WC	(Italy) A Vavassori	6	2	6
Q	E Karlovskiy	2	3
4	(Kazakhstan) M Kukushkin	6	6
8	(France) T Atmane	6	6
Alt	(China) F Sun	3	2
(Hong Kong) C Wong	7	7
Q	(Georgia (country)) A Bakshi	5	5
(United Kingdom) D Evans	6	6^{4}	6
WC	(France) B Paire	4	7^{7}	2
(United States) B Holt	7	6
2	P Kotov	5	4

Second round
Q	I Simakin	4	6	4
(Canada) A Galarneau	6	4	6
WC	(Italy) A Vavassori	2	6	6
4	(Kazakhstan) M Kukushkin	6	3	2
8	(France) T Atmane	6	6
(Hong Kong) C Wong	1	4
(United Kingdom) D Evans	6	5	5
(United States) B Holt	4	7	7

Quarterfinals
(Canada) A Galarneau	2	1
WC	(Italy) A Vavassori	6	6
8	(France) T Atmane	6	4	1
(United States) B Holt	3	6	6

Semifinals
WC	(Italy) A Vavassori	6	4	6
(United States) B Holt	4	6	4
