= 2023 Bahrain Ministry of Interior Tennis Challenger =

- Date: 13–19 February
- Edition: 2nd
- Surface: Hard
- Location: Manama, Bahrain

Champions

Singles
- (Australia) Thanasi Kokkinakis

Doubles
- (Finland) Patrik Niklas-Salminen / (Netherlands) Bart Stevens
← 2021 ·	Bahrain Ministry of Interior Tennis Challenger	· 2024 →

The 2023 Bahrain Ministry of Interior Tennis Challenger was a professional tennis tournament played on hardcourts. It was the second edition of the tournament which was part of the 2023 ATP Challenger Tour 125. It took place in Manama, Bahrain between 13 and 19 February 2023.

== Singles main-draw entrants ==
=== Seeds ===
Country	Player	Rank^{1}	Seed
AUS	Jason Kubler	79	1
AUS	Alexei Popyrin	90	2
AUS	Christopher O'Connell	94	3
ITA	Francesco Passaro	109	4
ITA	Matteo Arnaldi	110	5
CZE	Tomáš Macháč	117	6
	Pavel Kotov	128	7
AUS	Thanasi Kokkinakis	140	8

- ^{1} Rankings are as of 6 February 2023.

=== Other entrants ===
The following players received wildcards into the singles main draw:

- Bekkhan Atlangeriev
- (Bahrain) Yusuf Qaed
- (Jordan) Abedallah Shelbayh

The following player received entry into the singles main draw as a special exempt:

- (Italy) Stefano Travaglia

The following player received entry into the singles main draw as an alternate:

- (Spain) Oriol Roca Batalla

The following players received entry from the qualifying draw:

- (Italy) Andrea Arnaboldi
- (Ukraine) Aleksandr Braynin
- (Norway) Viktor Durasovic
- (Turkey) Yankı Erel
- (Ukraine) ~~Vitaliy Sachko~~
- (Egypt) Mohamed Safwat

The following players received entry as lucky losers:

- (Italy) Salvatore Caruso
- Andrey Chepelev
- (Northern Mariana Islands) Colin Sinclair

== Champions ==
=== Singles ===
- (Australia) Thanasi Kokkinakis def. (Jordan) Abedallah Shelbayh 6–1, 6–4.

=== Doubles ===
- (Finland) Patrik Niklas-Salminen / (Netherlands) Bart Stevens def. (Philippines) Ruben Gonzales / (Brazil) Fernando Romboli 6–3, 6–4.
