= 2024 Bahrain Ministry of Interior Tennis Challenger =

- Date: 12–17 February
- Edition: 3rd
- Surface: Hard
- Location: Manama, Bahrain

Champions

Singles
- (Kazakhstan) Mikhail Kukushkin

Doubles
- (Spain) Sergio Martos Gornés / (Greece) Petros Tsitsipas
← 2023 ·	Bahrain Ministry of Interior Tennis Challenger	· 2025 →

The 2024 Bahrain Ministry of Interior Tennis Challenger was a professional tennis tournament played on hardcourts. It was the third edition of the tournament which was part of the 2024 ATP Challenger Tour 125. It took place in Manama, Bahrain between 12 and 17 February 2024.

== Singles main-draw entrants ==
=== Seeds ===
Country	Player	Rank^{1}	Seed
AUS	Christopher O'Connell	64	1
ITA	Fabio Fognini	103	2
CZE	Vít Kopřiva	116	3
CZE	Jakub Menšík	130	4
FRA	Richard Gasquet	131	5
SVK	Lukáš Klein	143	6
BIH	Damir Džumhur	150	7
SWE	Elias Ymer	160	8

- ^{1} Rankings are as of 5 February 2024.

=== Other entrants ===
The following players received wildcards into the singles main draw:

- (Georgia (country)) Nikoloz Basilashvili
- (Italy) Fabio Fognini
- (Bahrain) Yusuf Qaed

The following players received entry into the singles main draw as alternates:

- (Slovakia) Jozef Kovalík
- (Kazakhstan) Mikhail Kukushkin

The following players received entry from the qualifying draw:

- (Bulgaria) Adrian Andreev
- (Italy) Peter Buldorini
- (Norway) Viktor Durasovic
- (Portugal) Gastão Elias
- (Turkey) Cem İlkel
- (France) Laurent Lokoli

== Champions ==
=== Singles ===
- (Kazakhstan) Mikhail Kukushkin def. (France) Richard Gasquet 7–6^{(7–5)}, 6–4.

=== Doubles ===
- (Spain) Sergio Martos Gornés / (Greece) Petros Tsitsipas def. (United States) Vasil Kirkov / (Finland) Patrik Niklas-Salminen 3–6, 6–3, [10–8].
