= 2026 Bahrain Ministry of Interior Tennis Challenger – Doubles =

Doubles
- 2026 Bahrain Ministry of Interior Tennis Challenger

Final
- Champions: (India) Sriram Balaji (Austria) Neil Oberleitner
- Runners-up: (United States) Vasil Kirkov (Netherlands) Bart Stevens
- Score: 7–6^{(7–1)}, 6–4

Events
Singles	Doubles
- Bahrain Ministry of Interior Tennis Challenger

Vitaliy Sachko and Beibit Zhukayev were the defending champions but chose not to defend their title.

Sriram Balaji and Neil Oberleitner won the title after defeating Vasil Kirkov and Bart Stevens 7–6^{(7–1)}, 6–4 in the final.

== Seeds ==
1. (Netherlands) Sander Arends / (Monaco) Romain Arneodo (semifinals)
2. (United States) Vasil Kirkov / (Netherlands) Bart Stevens (final)
3. (Brazil) Marcelo Demoliner / (Netherlands) Jean-Julien Rojer (semifinals)
4. (India) Sriram Balaji / (Austria) Neil Oberleitner (champions)

== Draw ==
Key

- Q = Qualifier
- WC = Wild card
- LL = Lucky loser
- Alt = Alternate
- ITF = ITF entry
- PR = Protected ranking
- SR = Special ranking
- SE = Special exempt
- JE = Junior exempt
- JR = Junior Accelerator Programme entrant
- CO = College Accelerator Programme entrant
- NG = Next Gen Accelerator Program entrant
- w/o = Walkover
- r = Retired
- d = Defaulted

First round
1	(Netherlands) S Arends (Monaco) R Arneodo	3	7	[10]
(France) G Blancaneaux (Thailand) P Isaro	6	5	[5]
(Poland) K Drzewiecki (Slovakia) L Pokorný	4	6	[10]
(Spain) Í Cervantes (Israel) D Cukierman	6	2	[7]
4	(India) S Balaji (Austria) N Oberleitner	6	6
(Japan) S Mochizuki (Italy) S Travaglia	2	1
(Romania) V Cornea (Croatia) N Serdarušić	6^{5}	6	[10]
(Mexico) R Pacheco Méndez (Argentina) TA Tirante	7^{7}	3	[12]
(India) A Kadhe (Poland) P Matuszewski	4	6	[10]
(Poland) S Kielan (Poland) F Pieczonka	6	2	[3]
WC	(India) M Dhamne (Ukraine) Vadym Ursu	1	4
3	(Brazil) M Demoliner (Netherlands) J-J Rojer	6	6
PR	(India) S Banthia (India) S Myneni	6	6^{3}	[10]
(India) J Nedunchezhiyan (India) R Ramanathan	3	7^{7}	[7]
WC	(Bahrain) Ahmed Al-Sayed (Bahrain) Y Qaed	0	0
2	(United States) V Kirkov (Netherlands) B Stevens	6	6

Quarterfinals
1	(Netherlands) S Arends (Monaco) R Arneodo	6	6
(Poland) K Drzewiecki (Slovakia) L Pokorný	1	0
4	(India) S Balaji (Austria) N Oberleitner	6	6
(Mexico) R Pacheco Méndez (Argentina) TA Tirante	3	4
(India) A Kadhe (Poland) P Matuszewski	3	6	[8]
3	(Brazil) M Demoliner (Netherlands) J-J Rojer	6	1	[10]
PR	(India) S Banthia (India) S Myneni	2	2
2	(United States) V Kirkov (Netherlands) B Stevens	6	6

Semifinals
1	(Netherlands) S Arends (Monaco) R Arneodo	5	5
4	(India) S Balaji (Austria) N Oberleitner	7	7
3	(Brazil) M Demoliner (Netherlands) J-J Rojer	4	2
2	(United States) V Kirkov (Netherlands) B Stevens	6	6

Final
4	(India) S Balaji (Austria) N Oberleitner	7^{7}	6
2	(United States) V Kirkov (Netherlands) B Stevens	6^{1}	4
