= 2023 Bahrain Ministry of Interior Tennis Challenger – Doubles =

Doubles
- 2023 Bahrain Ministry of Interior Tennis Challenger

Final
- Champions: (Finland) Patrik Niklas-Salminen (Netherlands) Bart Stevens
- Runners-up: (Philippines) Ruben Gonzales (Brazil) Fernando Romboli
- Score: 6–3, 6–4

Events
Singles	Doubles
- Bahrain Ministry of Interior Tennis Challenger

Nuno Borges and Francisco Cabral were the defending champions but chose not to defend their title.

Patrik Niklas-Salminen and Bart Stevens won the title after defeating Ruben Gonzales and Fernando Romboli 6–3, 6–4 in the final.

== Seeds ==
1. (Czech Republic) Roman Jebavý / (United Kingdom) Jonny O'Mara (semifinals)
2. (Monaco) Romain Arneodo / (Austria) Sam Weissborn (semifinals)
3. (Finland) Patrik Niklas-Salminen / (Netherlands) Bart Stevens (champions)
4. (Philippines) Ruben Gonzales / (Brazil) Fernando Romboli (final)

== Draw ==
Key

- Q = Qualifier
- WC = Wild card
- LL = Lucky loser
- Alt = Alternate
- ITF = ITF entry
- PR = Protected ranking
- SR = Special ranking
- SE = Special exempt
- JE = Junior exempt
- JR = Junior Accelerator Programme entrant
- CO = College Accelerator Programme entrant
- NG = Next Gen Accelerator Program entrant
- w/o = Walkover
- r = Retired
- d = Defaulted

First round
1	(Czech Republic) R Jebavý (United Kingdom) J O'Mara	6	7^{8}
(Czech Republic) V Kopřiva; P Kotov	3	6^{6}
(South Korea) Y-s Chung (Czech Republic) M Gengel	3	7^{8}	[10]
WC	(Australia) Al Popyrin (Australia) Anthony Popyrin	6	6^{6}	[8]
4	(Philippines) R Gonzales (Brazil) F Romboli	7^{7}	6^{7}	[10]
(Japan) T Matsui (Japan) K Uesugi	6^{3}	7^{9}	[6]
(Italy) A Arnaboldi (France) A Müller	7	6
(Northern Mariana Islands) C Sinclair (Australia) J Taylor	5	3
(India) P Raja (India) D Sharan	3	2
(Austria) M Neuchrist (Japan) K Uchida	6	6
(Italy) A Giannessi (Italy) L Giustino	1	3
3	(Finland) P Niklas-Salminen (Netherlands) B Stevens	6	6
(Norway) V Durasovic (Finland) O Virtanen	6	6
WC	(Turkey) Y Erel (Turkey) K Kırcı	4	4
PR	(Italy) J Ocleppo (Germany) K Wehnelt	6^{1}	4
2	(Monaco) R Arneodo (Austria) S Weissborn	7^{7}	6

Quarterfinals
1	(Czech Republic) R Jebavý (United Kingdom) J O'Mara	6	6
(South Korea) Y-s Chung (Czech Republic) M Gengel	3	4
4	(Philippines) R Gonzales (Brazil) F Romboli	7^{7}	6
(Italy) A Arnaboldi (France) A Müller	6^{4}	2
(Austria) M Neuchrist (Japan) K Uchida	4	4
3	(Finland) P Niklas-Salminen (Netherlands) B Stevens	6	6
(Norway) V Durasovic (Finland) O Virtanen	4	6	[7]
2	(Monaco) R Arneodo (Austria) S Weissborn	6	4	[10]

Semifinals
1	(Czech Republic) R Jebavý (United Kingdom) J O'Mara	5	6	[5]
4	(Philippines) R Gonzales (Brazil) F Romboli	7	4	[10]
3	(Finland) P Niklas-Salminen (Netherlands) B Stevens	6	2	[10]
2	(Monaco) R Arneodo (Austria) S Weissborn	3	6	[4]

Final
4	(Philippines) R Gonzales (Brazil) F Romboli	3	4
3	(Finland) P Niklas-Salminen (Netherlands) B Stevens	6	6
