= 2010 Davis Cup Asia/Oceania Zone Group IV =

International tennis competition

The Asia/Oceania Zone was one of the three zones of regional Davis Cup competition in 2010. It was divided into four groups. Teams in Group IV competed for promotion to Group III for 2011.

The Group IV tournament was held in the Week commencing April 19th, 2010 in Al-Hussein Tennis Club, Amman, Jordan, on outdoor hard courts.

== Format ==
The nine teams played in two groups, in round-robin format. Each tie consisted of two singles and one doubles match, each best-of-three sets. The winners of each group played off against the second-placed teams from the other group for promotion to the Asia/Oceania Zone Group III for 2011.

== Group A ==
Team	Pld	W	L	MF	MA	Pts
United Arab Emirates	4	4	0	11	1	4
Myanmar	4	3	1	9	3	3
Bahrain	4	2	2	6	6	2
Turkmenistan	4	1	3	4	8	1
Yemen	4	0	4	0	12	0

=== United Arab Emirates vs. Yemen ===
United Arab Emirates
3
Al-Hussein Tennis Club, Amman, Jordan
19 April 2010
Hard

Yemen
0

			1	2	3
1	(United Arab Emirates) (Yemen)	Omar Alawadhi; Ahmed Saif	6; 0	6; 1
2	(United Arab Emirates) (Yemen)	Mahmoud Nader Al Blooshi; Fahd Thabit	6; 0	6; 0
3	(United Arab Emirates) (Yemen)	Rashed Obaid Bushaqar / Hamad Abbas Janahi; Momen Hasan / Ahmed Saif	6; 2	6; 2

=== Myanmar vs. Turkmenistan ===
Myanmar
3
Al-Hussein Tennis Club, Amman, Jordan
19 April 2010
Hard

Turkmenistan
0

			1	2	3
1	(Myanmar) (Turkmenistan)	Zaw-Zaw Latt; Aleksandr Ernepesov	6; 3	6; 1
2	(Myanmar) (Turkmenistan)	Phyo Min Thar; Amankuli Begenjov	6; 1	6; 4
3	(Myanmar) (Turkmenistan)	Min Min / Phyo Min Thar; Bahtiyar Atabaev / Eziz Dovletov	6; 1	6; 2

=== United Arab Emirates vs. Turkmenistan ===
United Arab Emirates
3
Al-Hussein Tennis Club, Amman, Jordan
20 April 2010
Hard

Turkmenistan
0

			1	2	3
1	(United Arab Emirates) (Turkmenistan)	Omar Alawadhi; Aleksandr Ernepesov	7; 5	6; 2
2	(United Arab Emirates) (Turkmenistan)	Hamad Abbas Janahi; Amankuli Begenjov	6; 0	6; 2
3	(United Arab Emirates) (Turkmenistan)	Mahmoud Nader Al Blooshi / Omar Alawadhi; Bahtiyar Atabaev / Eziz Dovletov	6; 1	6; 1

=== Bahrain vs. Yemen ===
Bahrain
3
Al-Hussein Tennis Club, Amman, Jordan
20 April 2010
Hard

Yemen
0

			1	2	3
1	(Bahrain) (Yemen)	Sayed Hazem Al Mosawi; Ahmed Saif	6; 4	7; 5
2	(Bahrain) (Yemen)	Khaled Al Thawadi; Fahd Thabit	6; 3	6; 0
3	(Bahrain) (Yemen)	Khaled Al Thawadi / Yusuf Qaed; Momen Hasan / Mohammed Saif	6; 1	6; 0

=== Myanmar vs. Bahrain ===
Myanmar
2
Al-Hussein Tennis Club, Amman, Jordan
21 April 2010
Hard

Bahrain
1

			1	2	3
1	(Myanmar) (Bahrain)	Zaw-Zaw Latt; Khaled Al Thawadi	6; 1	6; 4
2	(Myanmar) (Bahrain)	Phyo Min Thar; Yusuf Qaed	6; 1	6; 2
3	(Myanmar) (Bahrain)	Zaw-Zaw Latt / Min Min; Esam Abdulaal / Khaled Al Thawadi	3; 6	4; 6

=== Turkmenistan vs. Yemen ===
Turkmenistan
3
Al-Hussein Tennis Club, Amman, Jordan
21 April 2010
Hard

Yemen
0

			1	2	3
1	(Turkmenistan) (Yemen)	Aleksandr Ernepesov; Ahmed Saif	6; 0	3; 0		retired
2	(Turkmenistan) (Yemen)	Eziz Dovletov; Momen Hasan	6; 3	6; 2
3	(Turkmenistan) (Yemen)	Bahtiyar Atabaev / Eziz Dovletov; Ahmed Saif / Fahd Thabit	6; 2	6^{6} 7^{8}	6; 3

=== United Arab Emirates vs. Bahrain ===
United Arab Emirates
3
Al-Hussein Tennis Club, Amman, Jordan
22 April 2010
Hard

Bahrain
0

			1	2	3
1	(United Arab Emirates) (Bahrain)	Mahmoud Nader Al Blooshi; Khaled Al Thawadi	6; 3	6; 3
2	(United Arab Emirates) (Bahrain)	Hamad Abbas Janahi; Yusuf Qaed	6; 1	6; 0
3	(United Arab Emirates) (Bahrain)	Omar Alawadhi / Hamad Abbas Janahi; Sayed Hazem Al Mosawi / Yusuf Qaed	6; 1	6; 1

=== Myanmar vs. Yemen ===
Myanmar
3
Al-Hussein Tennis Club, Amman, Jordan
22 April 2010
Hard

Yemen
0

			1	2	3
1	(Myanmar) (Yemen)	Zaw-Zaw Latt; Momen Hasan	6; 1	6; 0
2	(Myanmar) (Yemen)	Aung Kyaw Naing; Mohammed Saif	6; 1	6; 4
3	(Myanmar) (Yemen)	Min Min / Phyo Min Thar; Fahd Thabit / Momen Hasan	6; 4	6; 4

=== United Arab Emirates vs. Myanmar ===
United Arab Emirates
2
Al-Hussein Tennis Club, Amman, Jordan
23 April 2010
Hard

Myanmar
1

			1	2	3
1	(United Arab Emirates) (Myanmar)	Omar Alawadhi; Zaw-Zaw Latt	6; 4	4; 6	6; 3
2	(United Arab Emirates) (Myanmar)	Hamad Abbas Janahi; Phyo Min Thar	6; 0	6; 2
3	(United Arab Emirates) (Myanmar)	Mahmoud Nader Al Blooshi / Rashed Obaid Bushaqar; Zaw-Zaw Latt / Phyo Min Thar	4; 6	3; 6

=== Bahrain vs. Turkmenistan ===
Bahrain
2
Al-Hussein Tennis Club, Amman, Jordan
23 April 2010
Hard

Turkmenistan
1

			1	2	3
1	(Bahrain) (Turkmenistan)	Sayed Hazem Al Mosawi; Aleksandr Ernepesov	6; 3	6; 4
2	(Bahrain) (Turkmenistan)	Khaled Al Thawadi; Amankuli Begenjov	7^{7} 6^{3}	6; 4
3	(Bahrain) (Turkmenistan)	Esam Abdulaal / Khaled Al Thawadi; Bahtiyar Atabaev / Eziz Dovletov	1; 6	4; 6

== Group B ==
Team	Pld	W	L	MF	MA	Pts
Jordan	3	3	0	9	0	3
Singapore	3	2	1	5	4	2
Qatar	3	1	2	4	5	1
Iraq	3	0	3	0	9	0

=== Singapore vs. Iraq ===
Singapore
3
Al-Hussein Tennis Club, Amman, Jordan
19 April 2010
Hard

Iraq
0

			1	2	3
1	(Singapore) (Iraq)	Chee-Jun Leong; Akram M Abdalkarem Al-Saadi	5; 7	7; 5	6; 3
2	(Singapore) (Iraq)	Stanley Armando; Ali Khairi Hashim Al Mayahi	6; 1	6; 2
3	(Singapore) (Iraq)	Abdul Hakim Bin Jamaludin / Chee-Jun Leong; Ahmed Hamzah Abdulhasan / Ali Khairi Hashim Al Mayahi	6; 3	6; 2

=== Jordan vs. Qatar ===
Jordan
3
Al-Hussein Tennis Club, Amman, Jordan
20 April 2010
Hard

Qatar
0

			1	2	3
1	(Jordan) (Qatar)	Ahmed Ibrahim Ahmad Alhadid; Jabor Al-Mutawa	6; 2	6; 1
2	(Jordan) (Qatar)	Mohammad Alaisowi; Mousa Shanan Zayed	6; 4	7^{7} 6^{2}
3	(Jordan) (Qatar)	Fabio Badra / Fawaz El Hourani; Jabor Al-Mutawa / Mousa Shanan Zayed	6; 4	6; 2

=== Jordan vs. Iraq ===
Jordan
3
Al-Hussein Tennis Club, Amman, Jordan
21 April 2010
Hard

Iraq
0

			1	2	3
1	(Jordan) (Iraq)	Ahmed Ibrahim Ahmad Alhadid; Akram M Abdalkarem Al-Saadi	6; 0	6; 1
2	(Jordan) (Iraq)	Mohammad Alaisowi; Ali Khairi Hashim Al Mayahi	6; 1	6; 4
3	(Jordan) (Iraq)	Fabio Badra / Fawaz El Hourani; Ahmed Hamzah Abdulhasan / Ali Khairi Hashim Al Mayahi	6; 1	7^{7} 6^{3}

=== Singapore vs. Qatar ===
Singapore
2
Al-Hussein Tennis Club, Amman, Jordan
21 April 2010
Hard

Qatar
1

			1	2	3
1	(Singapore) (Qatar)	Chee-Jun Leong; Jabor Al-Mutawa	6; 3	6; 2
2	(Singapore) (Qatar)	Stanley Armando; Mousa Shanan Zayed	3; 6	2; 6
3	(Singapore) (Qatar)	Stanley Armando / Abdul Hakim Bin Jamaludin; Jabor Al-Mutawa / Mousa Shanan Zayed	6; 3	6; 3

=== Qatar vs. Iraq ===
Qatar
3
Al-Hussein Tennis Club, Amman, Jordan
22 April 2010
Hard

Iraq
0

			1	2	3
1	(Qatar) (Iraq)	Jabor Al-Mutawa; Akram M Abdalkarem Al-Saadi	6; 1	6; 4
2	(Qatar) (Iraq)	Mousa Shanan Zayed; Ali Khairi Hashim Al Mayahi	7; 5	6; 2
3	(Qatar) (Iraq)	Jabor Al-Mutawa / Mousa Shanan Zayed; Ali Khairi Hashim Al Mayahi / Akram M Abdalkarem Al-Saadi	6^{3} 7^{7}	6; 3	7^{7} 6^{3}

=== Jordan vs. Singapore ===
Jordan
3
Al-Hussein Tennis Club, Amman, Jordan
23 April 2010
Hard

Singapore
0

			1	2	3
1	(Jordan) (Singapore)	Ahmed Ibrahim Ahmad Alhadid; Abdul Hakim Bin Jamaludin	6; 3	7; 5
2	(Jordan) (Singapore)	Mohammad Alaisowi; Stanley Armando	6; 1	7^{7} 6^{2}
3	(Jordan) (Singapore)	Ahmed Ibrahim Ahmad Alhadid / Fawaz El Hourani; Abdul Hakim Bin Jamaludin / Chee-Jun Leong	7^{7} 6^{3}	7; 5

== Promotion Playoffs ==
United Arab Emirates and Myanmar promoted to Group III for 2011.

=== United Arab Emirates vs. Singapore ===
United Arab Emirates
2
Al-Hussein Tennis Club, Amman, Jordan
24 April 2010
Hard

Singapore
1

			1	2	3
1	(United Arab Emirates) (Singapore)	Omar Alawadhi; Abdul Hakim Bin Jamaludin	6; 3	6; 0
2	(United Arab Emirates) (Singapore)	Hamad Abbas Janahi; Stanley Armando	6^{3} 7^{7}	6; 2	6; 4
3	(United Arab Emirates) (Singapore)	Mahmoud Nader Al Blooshi / Rashed Obaid Bushaqar; Abdul Hakim Bin Jamaludin / Chee-Jun Leong	6^{4} 7^{7}	6^{2} 7^{7}

=== Jordan vs. Myanmar ===
Jordan
1
Al-Hussein Tennis Club, Amman, Jordan
24 April 2010
Hard

Myanmar
2

			1	2	3
1	(Jordan) (Myanmar)	Ahmed Ibrahim Ahmad Alhadid; Zaw-Zaw Latt	6^{4} 7^{7}	6; 3	2; 6
2	(Jordan) (Myanmar)	Mohammad Alaisowi; Phyo Min Thar	6; 1	4; 6	6; 3
3	(Jordan) (Myanmar)	Ahmed Ibrahim Ahmad Alhadid / Fawaz El Hourani; Zaw-Zaw Latt / Phyo Min Thar	6^{6} 7^{8}	3; 6

== 5th–8th Playoffs ==
=== Bahrain vs. Qatar ===
Bahrain
2
Al-Hussein Tennis Club, Amman, Jordan
24 April 2010
Hard

Qatar
1

			1	2	3
1	(Bahrain) (Qatar)	Khaled Al Thawadi; Jabor Al-Mutawa	6; 0	6; 1
2	(Bahrain) (Qatar)	Yusuf Qaed; Mousa Shanan Zayed	3; 6	1; 6
3	(Bahrain) (Qatar)	Khaled Al Thawadi / Yusuf Qaed; Jabor Al-Mutawa / Mousa Shanan Zayed	7^{7} 6^{0}	6; 2

=== Turkmenistan vs. Iraq ===
Turkmenistan
3
Al-Hussein Tennis Club, Amman, Jordan
24 April 2010
Hard

Iraq
0

			1	2	3
1	(Turkmenistan) (Iraq)	Aleksandr Ernepesov; Hussein Albeer	6; 1	6; 3
2	(Turkmenistan) (Iraq)	Amankuli Begenjov; Ahmed Hamzah Abdulhasan	6; 2	3; 6	6; 3
3	(Turkmenistan) (Iraq)	Amankuli Begenjov / Aleksandr Ernepesov; Ahmed Hamzah Abdulhasan / Ali Khairi Hashim Al Mayahi	6; 2	6; 4

== Final standings ==
Rank	Team
1	United Arab Emirates
2	Myanmar
3	Jordan
4	Singapore
5	Bahrain
6	Qatar
7	Turkmenistan
8	Iraq
9	Yemen

- United Arab Emirates and Myanmar promoted to Group III in 2011.
