= 2026 Bahrain Ministry of Interior Tennis Challenger – Singles =

Singles
- 2026 Bahrain Ministry of Interior Tennis Challenger

Final
- Champion: (France) Kyrian Jacquet
- Runner-up: (Italy) Luca Nardi
- Score: 7–5, 3–6, 6–4

Events
Singles	Doubles
- Bahrain Ministry of Interior Tennis Challenger

Márton Fucsovics was the defending champion but chose not to defend his title.

Kyrian Jacquet won the title after defeating Luca Nardi 7–5, 3–6, 6–4 in the final.

== Seeds ==
1. (Australia) Alexei Popyrin (first round)
2. (Italy) Mattia Bellucci (semifinals)
3. (United Kingdom) Jacob Fearnley (quarterfinals)
4. (Austria) Filip Misolic (first round)
5. (Germany) Yannick Hanfmann (second round)
6. (Argentina) Thiago Agustín Tirante (quarterfinals)
7. (Italy) Luca Nardi (final)
8. (Japan) Shintaro Mochizuki (first round)

== Draw ==
Key

- Q = Qualifier
- WC = Wild card
- LL = Lucky loser
- Alt = Alternate
- ITF = ITF entry
- PR = Protected ranking
- SR = Special ranking
- SE = Special exempt
- JE = Junior exempt
- JR = Junior Accelerator Programme entrant
- CO = College Accelerator Programme entrant
- NG = Next Gen Accelerator Program entrant
- w/o = Walkover
- r = Retired
- d = Defaulted

=== Finals ===
Semifinals
7	(Italy) Luca Nardi	7^{8}	6
(Finland) Otto Virtanen	6^{6}	2
(France) Kyrian Jacquet	6^{9}	6	7^{8}
2/WC	(Italy) Mattia Bellucci	7^{11}	4	6^{6}

Final
7	(Italy) Luca Nardi	5	6	4
(France) Kyrian Jacquet	7	3	6

=== Top half ===
First round
1/WC	(Australia) A Popyrin	3	6^{6}
(France) U Blanchet	6	7^{8}
(France) H Grenier	6^{5}	6	6
LL	(Kazakhstan) B Zhukayev	7^{7}	2	1
(Norway) N Budkov Kjær	5	6	7
Q	(Bulgaria) D Kuzmanov	7	1	5
(Mexico) R Pacheco Méndez	6^{5}	6^{1}
7	(Italy) L Nardi	7^{7}	7^{7}
4	(Austria) F Misolic	6^{5}	6^{4}
(Italy) L Giustino	7^{7}	7^{7}
WC	(China) Z Zhang	6	6^{12}	6^{5}
(Finland) O Virtanen	4	7^{14}	7^{7}
(Hong Kong) C Wong	6	6
(United Kingdom) R Peniston	3	2
(Italy) S Travaglia	6	7^{7}
8	(Japan) S Mochizuki	3	6^{1}

Second round
(France) U Blanchet	7^{7}	6
(France) H Grenier	6^{5}	4
(Norway) N Budkov Kjær	3	0
7	(Italy) L Nardi	6	6
(Italy) L Giustino	6^{4}	3
(Finland) O Virtanen	7^{7}	6
(Hong Kong) C Wong	7^{7}	3	4
(Italy) S Travaglia	6^{4}	6	6

Quarterfinals
(France) U Blanchet	4	4
7	(Italy) L Nardi	6	6
(Finland) O Virtanen	6	7
(Italy) S Travaglia	4	5

Semifinals
7	(Italy) L Nardi	7^{8}	6
(Finland) O Virtanen	6^{6}	2

=== Bottom half ===
First round
5	(Germany) Y Hanfmann	6	6
Q	(India) M Dhamne	3	2
(France) K Jacquet	6	6
(Australia) C O'Connell	3	1
Q	(Slovakia) L Pokorný	6	7
(Netherlands) G den Ouden	4	5
(Austria) L Neumayer	3	6^{4}
3	(United Kingdom) J Fearnley	6	7^{7}
6	(Argentina) TA Tirante	6	6
(France) G Blancaneaux	3	3
Q	(Ukraine) Vadym Ursu	6^{5}	4
(Austria) J Schwärzler	7^{7}	6
NG	(Czech Republic) M Mrva	2	2
Q	(Lithuania) E Butvilas	6	6
Q	(Turkey) Y Erel	4	4
2/WC	(Italy) M Bellucci	6	6

Second round
5	(Germany) Y Hanfmann	3	6^{3}
(France) K Jacquet	6	7^{7}
Q	(Slovakia) L Pokorný	6	4	1
3	(United Kingdom) J Fearnley	3	6	6
6	(Argentina) TA Tirante	3	6	6
(Austria) J Schwärzler	6	2	3
Q	(Lithuania) E Butvilas	4	5
2/WC	(Italy) M Bellucci	6	7

Quarterfinals
(France) K Jacquet	7^{7}	1	6
3	(United Kingdom) J Fearnley	6^{4}	6	3
6	(Argentina) TA Tirante	4	4
2/WC	(Italy) M Bellucci	6	6

Semifinals
(France) K Jacquet	6^{9}	6	7^{8}
2/WC	(Italy) M Bellucci	7^{11}	4	6^{6}
