= 2025 Bahrain Ministry of Interior Tennis Challenger =

- Date: 10–15 February
- Edition: 4th
- Surface: Hard
- Location: Manama, Bahrain

Champions

Singles
- (Hungary) Márton Fucsovics

Doubles
- (Ukraine) Vitaliy Sachko / (Kazakhstan) Beibit Zhukayev
← 2024 ·	Bahrain Ministry of Interior Tennis Challenger	· 2026 →

The 2025 Bahrain Ministry of Interior Tennis Challenger was a professional tennis tournament played on hardcourts. It was the fourth edition of the tournament which was part of the 2025 ATP Challenger Tour 125. It took place in Manama, Bahrain between 10 and 15 February 2025.

== Singles main-draw entrants ==
=== Seeds ===
Country	Player	Rank^{1}	Seed
HUN	Márton Fucsovics	96	1
	Pavel Kotov	103	2
NED	Jesper de Jong	109	3
KAZ	Mikhail Kukushkin	112	4
JPN	Yasutaka Uchiyama	146	5
GEO	Nikoloz Basilashvili	147	6
CRO	Duje Ajduković	158	7
FRA	Térence Atmane	160	8

- ^{1} Rankings are as of 3 February 2025.

=== Other entrants ===
The following players received wildcards into the singles main draw:

- (Norway) Nicolai Budkov Kjær
- (France) Benoît Paire
- (Italy) Andrea Vavassori

The following players received entry into the singles main draw as alternates:

- (United Kingdom) Charles Broom
- (Norway) Viktor Durasovic
- (China) Sun Fajing

The following players received entry from the qualifying draw:

- (Georgia (country)) Aleksandre Bakshi
- Petr Bar Biryukov
- Evgeny Karlovskiy
- (Bulgaria) Dimitar Kuzmanov
- Marat Sharipov
- Ilia Simakin

== Champions ==
=== Singles ===
- (Hungary) Márton Fucsovics def. (Italy) Andrea Vavassori 6–3, 6–7^{(3–7)}, 6–4.

=== Doubles ===
- (Ukraine) Vitaliy Sachko / (Kazakhstan) Beibit Zhukayev def. Ivan Liutarevich / (France) Luca Sanchez 6–4, 6–0.
