= 2025 Brawo Open – Doubles =

Doubles
- 2025 Brawo Open

Final
- Champions: (United States) Vasil Kirkov (Netherlands) Bart Stevens
- Runners-up: (Peru) Alexander Merino (Germany) Christoph Negritu
- Score: 6–2, 6–3

Events
| Singles | Doubles |
- Brawo Open

Sander Arends and Robin Haase were the defending champions but chose not to defend their title.

Vasil Kirkov and Bart Stevens won the title after defeating Alexander Merino and Christoph Negritu 6–2, 6–3 in the final.

== Seeds ==
1. (France) Théo Arribagé / (Brazil) Orlando Luz (first round)
2. (Germany) Jakob Schnaitter / (Germany) Mark Wallner (quarterfinals)
3. (Germany) Hendrik Jebens / (France) Albano Olivetti (first round)
4. (Colombia) Nicolás Barrientos / (Mexico) Miguel Ángel Reyes-Varela (quarterfinals)

== Draw ==
Key

- Q = Qualifier
- WC = Wild card
- LL = Lucky loser
- Alt = Alternate
- ITF = ITF entry
- PR = Protected ranking
- SR = Special ranking
- SE = Special exempt
- JE = Junior exempt
- JR = Junior Accelerator Programme entrant
- CO = College Accelerator Programme entrant
- NG = Next Gen Accelerator Program entrant
- w/o = Walkover
- r = Retired
- d = Defaulted

=== Draw ===
First round
1 | (France) T Arribagé (Brazil) O Luz | 2 | 3
(United States) V Kirkov (Netherlands) B Stevens | 6 | 6
(India) S Balaji (India) RC Bollipalli | 6 | 6
(Poland) K Drzewiecki (Chinese Taipei) R Ho | 3 | 2
3 | (Germany) H Jebens (France) A Olivetti | 6 | 3 | [8]
I Liutarevich (Netherlands) M Veldheer | 3 | 6 | [10]
(Italy) M Bortolotti (Italy) G Ricca | 6 | 6
WC | (Germany) J Opitz (Germany) Tom Zeuch | 4 | 4
(Spain) Í Cervantes (Argentina) G Durán | 6 | 6^{6} | [7]
(Peru) A Merino (Germany) C Negritu | 4 | 7^{8} | [10]
(Argentina) M Kestelboim (Spain) D Vega Hernández | 6 | 3 | [7]
4 | (Colombia) N Barrientos (Mexico) M Reyes-Varela | 4 | 6 | [10]
(Netherlands) M Middelkoop (Netherlands) J-J Rojer | 6 | 3 | [8]
WC | (Germany) D Masur (Germany) B Sanchez Martinez | 4 | 6 | [10]
(Ecuador) G Escobar (Ecuador) D Hidalgo | 5 | 3
2 | (Germany) J Schnaitter (Germany) M Wallner | 7 | 6

Quarterfinals
(United States) V Kirkov (Netherlands) B Stevens | 6^{6} | 7^{7} | [10]
(India) S Balaji (India) RC Bollipalli | 7^{8} | 6^{5} | [5]
I Liutarevich (Netherlands) M Veldheer | 6 | 6^{5} | [10]
(Italy) M Bortolotti (Italy) G Ricca | 4 | 7^{7} | [7]
(Peru) A Merino (Germany) C Negritu | 5 | 6 | [10]
4 | (Colombia) N Barrientos (Mexico) M Reyes-Varela | 7 | 4 | [5]
WC | (Germany) D Masur (Germany) B Sanchez Martinez | 7 | 6
2 | (Germany) J Schnaitter (Germany) M Wallner | 5 | 4

Semifinals
(United States) V Kirkov (Netherlands) B Stevens | 6 | 4 | [10]
I Liutarevich (Netherlands) M Veldheer | 3 | 6 | [4]
(Peru) A Merino (Germany) C Negritu | 6 | 6
WC | (Germany) D Masur (Germany) B Sanchez Martinez | 4 | 3

Final
(United States) V Kirkov (Netherlands) B Stevens | 6 | 6
(Peru) A Merino (Germany) C Negritu | 2 | 3
