= 2024 Bahrain Ministry of Interior Tennis Challenger – Singles =

Singles
- 2024 Bahrain Ministry of Interior Tennis Challenger

Final
- Champion: (Kazakhstan) Mikhail Kukushkin
- Runner-up: (France) Richard Gasquet
- Score: 7–6^{(7–5)}, 6–4

Events
Singles	Doubles
- Bahrain Ministry of Interior Tennis Challenger

Thanasi Kokkinakis was the defending champion but chose not to defend his title.

Mikhail Kukushkin won the title after defeating Richard Gasquet 7–6^{(7–5)}, 6–4 in the final.

== Seeds ==
1. (Australia) Christopher O'Connell (first round, retired)
2. (Italy) Fabio Fognini (second round)
3. (Czech Republic) Vít Kopřiva (first round)
4. (Czech Republic) Jakub Menšík (semifinals)
5. (France) Richard Gasquet (final)
6. (Slovakia) Lukáš Klein (first round)
7. (Bosnia and Herzegovina) Damir Džumhur (semifinals)
8. (Sweden) Elias Ymer (first round)

== Draw ==
Key

- Q = Qualifier
- WC = Wild card
- LL = Lucky loser
- Alt = Alternate
- ITF = ITF entry
- PR = Protected ranking
- SR = Special ranking
- SE = Special exempt
- JE = Junior exempt
- JR = Junior Accelerator Programme entrant
- CO = College Accelerator Programme entrant
- NG = Next Gen Accelerator Program entrant
- w/o = Walkover
- r = Retired
- d = Defaulted

=== Finals ===
Semifinals
5	(France) Richard Gasquet	6	7^{7}
7	(Bosnia and Herzegovina) Damir Džumhur	3	6^{4}
4	(Czech Republic) Jakub Menšík	3	2
Alt	(Kazakhstan) Mikhail Kukushkin	6	6

Final
5	(France) Richard Gasquet	6^{5}	4
Alt	(Kazakhstan) Mikhail Kukushkin	7^{7}	6

=== Top half ===
First round
1	(Australia) C O'Connell	6^{6}	0^{r}
(United Kingdom) B Harris	7^{8}	0
Q	(Portugal) G Elias	3	6	7^{8}
Q	(Turkey) C İlkel	6	1	6^{6}
(United Kingdom) R Peniston	4^{r}
Q	(Italy) Peter Buldorini	2
(Switzerland) M-A Hüsler	3	4
5	(France) R Gasquet	6	6
3	(Czech Republic) V Kopřiva	1	4
Q	(France) L Lokoli	6	6
Q	(Norway) V Durasovic	4	6	5
(Spain) D Rincón	6	1	7
Q	(Bulgaria) A Andreev	6	6
(Finland) O Virtanen	1	2
(Italy) A Giannessi	3	1
7	(Bosnia and Herzegovina) D Džumhur	6	6

Second round
(United Kingdom) B Harris	6	6
Q	(Portugal) G Elias	2	2
Q	(Italy) P Buldorini	5	3
5	(France) R Gasquet	7	6
Q	(France) L Lokoli	6	1	4
(Spain) D Rincón	3	6	6
Q	(Bulgaria) A Andreev	0	1
7	(Bosnia and Herzegovina) D Džumhur	6	6

Quarterfinals
(United Kingdom) B Harris	7	1	2
5	(France) R Gasquet	5	6	6
(Spain) D Rincón	4	4
7	(Bosnia and Herzegovina) D Džumhur	6	6

Semifinals
5	(France) R Gasquet	6	7^{7}
7	(Bosnia and Herzegovina) D Džumhur	3	6^{4}

=== Bottom half ===
First round
6	(Slovakia) L Klein	4	6	3
(Argentina) M Trungelliti	6	3	6
(Tunisia) A Dougaz	6	6
(Germany) R Molleker	3	1
(Portugal) G Oliveira	6^{3}	6^{5}
(Bosnia and Herzegovina) N Fatić	7^{7}	7^{7}
WC	(Georgia (country)) N Basilashvili	3	4
4	(Czech Republic) J Menšík	6	6
8	(Sweden) E Ymer	2	4
(Switzerland) A Ritschard	6	6
(Czech Republic) D Svrčina	2	2
Alt	(Kazakhstan) M Kukushkin	6	6
(Jordan) A Shelbayh	7^{7}	6
Alt	(Slovakia) J Kovalík	6^{4}	3
WC	(Bahrain) Y Qaed	1	1
2/WC	(Italy) F Fognini	6	6

Second round
(Argentina) M Trungelliti	7	6^{5}	7
(Tunisia) A Dougaz	5	7^{7}	5
(Bosnia and Herzegovina) N Fatić	1	4
4	(Czech Republic) J Menšík	6	6
(Switzerland) A Ritschard	4	4
Alt	(Kazakhstan) M Kukushkin	6	6
(Jordan) A Shelbayh	3	7^{7}	6
2/WC	(Italy) F Fognini	6	6^{5}	0

Quarterfinals
(Argentina) M Trungelliti	3	1^{r}
4	(Czech Republic) J Menšík	6	2
Alt	(Kazakhstan) M Kukushkin	6	6
(Jordan) A Shelbayh	4	4

Semifinals
4	(Czech Republic) J Menšík	3	2
Alt	(Kazakhstan) M Kukushkin	6	6
