= 2025 Challenger de Santiago – Singles =

Singles
- 2025 Challenger de Santiago

Final
- Champion: (Colombia) Daniel Elahi Galán
- Runner-up: (Brazil) Thiago Monteiro
- Score: 7–5, 6–3

Events
Singles	Doubles
- Challenger de Santiago

Juan Pablo Varillas was the defending champion but lost in the first round to Matheus Pucinelli de Almeida.

Daniel Elahi Galán won the title after defeating Thiago Monteiro 7–5, 6–3 in the final.

== Seeds ==
1. (Brazil) Thiago Monteiro (final)
2. (Colombia) Daniel Elahi Galán (champion)
3. (Chile) Tomás Barrios Vera (second round)
4. (Argentina) Juan Pablo Ficovich (first round)
5. (Paraguay) Daniel Vallejo (first round)
6. (Peru) Juan Pablo Varillas (first round)
7. (Bolivia) Murkel Dellien (second round)
8. (Argentina) Andrea Collarini (quarterfinals)

== Draw ==
Key

- Q = Qualifier
- WC = Wild card
- LL = Lucky loser
- Alt = Alternate
- ITF = ITF entry
- PR = Protected ranking
- SR = Special ranking
- SE = Special exempt
- JE = Junior exempt
- JR = Junior Accelerator Programme entrant
- CO = College Accelerator Programme entrant
- NG = Next Gen Accelerator Program entrant
- w/o = Walkover
- r = Retired
- d = Defaulted

=== Finals ===
Semifinals
1	(Brazil) Thiago Monteiro	7	7^{7}
(Peru) Ignacio Buse	5	6^{4}
(United States) Emilio Nava	6^{8}	2
2	(Colombia) Daniel Elahi Galán	7^{10}	6

Final
1	(Brazil) Thiago Monteiro	5	3
2	(Colombia) Daniel Elahi Galán	7	6

=== Top half ===
First round
1	(Brazil) T Monteiro	7	6^{1}	6
(Brazil) M Alves	5	7^{7}	3
(Argentina) L Midón	6	7
Q	(Brazil) P Boscardin Dias	2	5
Q	(Argentina) GI Justo	2	7^{7}	5^{r}
(Argentina) GA Olivieri	6	6^{3}	6
(Brazil) K Sell	2	4
7	(Bolivia) M Dellien	6	6
3	(Chile) T Barrios Vera	3	6	7
WC	(Germany) D Dedura-Palomero	6	2	5
Q	(Brazil) JL Reis da Silva	6	6
(Chile) M Soto	4	3
(Peru) I Buse	6	2	6
(Spain) P Martín Tiffon	3	6	2
Q	(Switzerland) K Feldbausch	6	6
5	(Paraguay) AD Vallejo	2	2

Second round
1	(Brazil) T Monteiro	7	7
(Argentina) L Midón	5	5
(Argentina) GA Olivieri	6	2	7
7	(Bolivia) M Dellien	3	6	5
3	(Chile) T Barrios Vera	3	1
Q	(Brazil) JL Reis da Silva	6	6
(Peru) I Buse	6	7^{7}
Q	(Switzerland) K Feldbausch	3	6^{2}

Quarterfinals
1	(Brazil) T Monteiro	3	6	6
(Argentina) GA Olivieri	6	3	3
Q	(Brazil) JL Reis da Silva	2	2
(Peru) I Buse	6	6

Semifinals
1	(Brazil) T Monteiro	7	7^{7}
(Peru) I Buse	5	6^{4}

=== Bottom half ===
First round
8	(Argentina) A Collarini	4	6	6
(Ecuador) Á Guillén Meza	6	4	4
WC	(Chile) Nicolás Vilallón	4	6	3
Q	(Japan) Yuki Mochizuki	6	3	6
(Kazakhstan) D Popko	3	4
(Peru) G Bueno	6	6
(United States) Em Nava	6	6
4	(Argentina) JP Ficovich	0	4
6	(Peru) JP Varillas	3	6	2
(Brazil) M Pucinelli de Almeida	6	3	6
Alt	(Argentina) R Olivo	6	3	7^{7}
Q	(Brazil) PA Saraiva dos Santos	3	6	6^{5}
WC	(Chile) Benjamín Torrealba	0	2
(Brazil) P Sakamoto	6	6
(Argentina) JB Torres	4	4
2	(Colombia) DE Galán	6	6

Second round
8	(Argentina) A Collarini	6	6
Q	(Japan) Y Mochizuki	2	1
(Peru) G Bueno	6	1	3
(United States) Em Nava	1	6	6
(Brazil) M Pucinelli de Almeida	6^{2}	6	6
Alt	(Argentina) R Olivo	7^{7}	2	1
(Brazil) P Sakamoto	3	4
2	(Colombia) DE Galán	6	6

Quarterfinals
8	(Argentina) A Collarini	7	3	3
(United States) Em Nava	5	6	6
(Brazil) M Pucinelli de Almeida	6^{4}	6^{4}
2	(Colombia) DE Galán	7^{7}	7^{7}

Semifinals
(United States) Em Nava	6^{8}	2
2	(Colombia) DE Galán	7^{10}	6
