= 2025 Challenger de Santiago =

- Date: 10–16 March
- Edition: 19th
- Surface: Clay
- Location: Santiago, Chile

Champions

Singles
- (Colombia) Daniel Elahi Galán

Doubles
- (United States) Vasil Kirkov / (Chile) Matías Soto
- Challenger de Santiago

The 2025 Challenger de Santiago was a professional tennis tournament played on clay courts. It was the 19th edition of the tournament which was part of the 2025 ATP Challenger Tour. It took place in Santiago, Chile between 10 and 16 March 2025.

== Singles main-draw entrants ==
=== Seeds ===
| Country | Player | Rank^{1} | Seed |
|---|---|---|---|
| BRA | Thiago Monteiro | 105 | 1 |
| COL | Daniel Elahi Galán | 123 | 2 |
| CHI | Tomás Barrios Vera | 153 | 3 |
| ARG | Juan Pablo Ficovich | 169 | 4 |
| PAR | Daniel Vallejo | 195 | 5 |
| PER | Juan Pablo Varillas | 198 | 6 |
| BOL | Murkel Dellien | 199 | 7 |
| ARG | Andrea Collarini | 202 | 8 |

- ^{1} Rankings are as of 3 March 2025.

=== Other entrants ===
The following players received wildcards into the singles main draw:

- (Germany) Diego Dedura-Palomero
- (Chile) Benjamín Torrealba
- (Chile) Nicolás Villalón

The following player received entry into the singles main draw as an alternate:

- (Argentina) Renzo Olivo

The following players received entry from the qualifying draw:

- (Brazil) Pedro Boscardin Dias
- (Switzerland) Kilian Feldbausch
- (Argentina) Guido Iván Justo
- (Japan) Yuki Mochizuki
- (Brazil) João Lucas Reis da Silva
- (Brazil) Paulo André Saraiva dos Santos

== Champions ==
=== Singles ===
- (Colombia) Daniel Elahi Galán def. (Brazil) Thiago Monteiro 7–5, 6–3.

=== Doubles ===
- (United States) Vasil Kirkov / (Chile) Matías Soto def. (Brazil) Mateus Alves / (Brazil) Luís Britto 6–4, 6–3.
