= 2021 Bahrain Ministry of Interior Tennis Challenger – Singles =

Singles
- 2021 Bahrain Ministry of Interior Tennis Challenger

Final
- Champion: (India) Ramkumar Ramanathan
- Runner-up: (Russia) Evgeny Karlovskiy
- Score: 6–1, 6–4

Events
Singles	Doubles
- Bahrain Ministry of Interior Tennis Challenger

This was the first edition of the tournament.

Ramkumar Ramanathan won the title after defeating Evgeny Karlovskiy 6–1, 6–4 in the final.

== Seeds ==
1. (Moldova) Radu Albot (withdrew)
2. (Turkey) Cem İlkel (second round)
3. (Turkey) Altuğ Çelikbilek (first round)
4. (Australia) Christopher O'Connell (first round)
5. (India) Prajnesh Gunneswaran (first round)
6. (India) Ramkumar Ramanathan (champion)
7. (United Kingdom) Jay Clarke (semifinals)
8. (Bosnia and Herzegovina) Mirza Bašić (first round)

== Draw ==
Key

- Q = Qualifier
- WC = Wild card
- LL = Lucky loser
- Alt = Alternate
- ITF = ITF entry
- PR = Protected ranking
- SR = Special ranking
- SE = Special exempt
- JE = Junior exempt
- JR = Junior Accelerator Programme entrant
- CO = College Accelerator Programme entrant
- NG = Next Gen Accelerator Program entrant
- w/o = Walkover
- r = Retired
- d = Defaulted

=== Finals ===
Semifinals
6	(India) Ramkumar Ramanathan	5	6	6
7	(United Kingdom) Jay Clarke	7	3	2
WC	(Turkey) Yankı Erel	6	6^{6}	3
(Russia) Evgeny Karlovskiy	3	7^{8}	6

Final
6	(India) Ramkumar Ramanathan	6	6
(Russia) Evgeny Karlovskiy	1	4

=== Top half ===
First round
Q	(Czech Republic) M Gengel	4	4
(Portugal) G Oliveira	6	6
(France) A Escoffier	6	6
Q	(Austria) M Neuchrist	3	4
(Croatia) D Ajduković	6	6
Alt	(India) M Sasikumar	4	4
Q	(Ukraine) V Orlov	2	4
6	(India) R Ramanathan	6	6
3	(Turkey) A Çelikbilek	2	3
Q	(Bulgaria) A Lazarov	6	6
(Bosnia and Herzegovina) N Fatić	6	6
(Austria) L Miedler	3	3
(Italy) M Viola	6	7
(Chinese Taipei) Y-h Hsu	4	5
WC	(Bahrain) H Abdulnabi	0	0
7	(United Kingdom) J Clarke	6	6

Second round
(Portugal) G Oliveira	7^{7}	3	6
(France) A Escoffier	6^{5}	6	4
(Croatia) D Ajduković	2	4
6	(India) R Ramanathan	6	6
Q	(Bulgaria) A Lazarov	6	7^{7}
(Bosnia and Herzegovina) N Fatić	3	6^{3}
(Italy) M Viola	2	1
7	(United Kingdom) J Clarke	6	6

Quarterfinals
(Portugal) G Oliveira	3	6	5
6	(India) R Ramanathan	6	4	7
Q	(Bulgaria) A Lazarov	2	0^{r}
7	(United Kingdom) J Clarke	6	1

Semifinals
6	(India) R Ramanathan	5	6	6
7	(United Kingdom) J Clarke	7	3	2

=== Bottom half ===
First round
5	(India) P Gunneswaran	3	3
WC	(Turkey) Y Erel	6	6
(Japan) H Moriya	6	6
(Finland) O Virtanen	3	2
(France) G Blancaneaux	6	6
WC	(Spain) Iván Marrero Curbelo	3	2
(United Kingdom) R Peniston	6^{5}	6	7^{7}
4	(Australia) C O'Connell	7^{7}	3	6^{4}
8	(Bosnia and Herzegovina) M Bašić	2	3
(Russia) E Karlovskiy	6	6
LL	(Germany) J Härteis	6	6
(Austria) A Erler	3	4
(Portugal) N Borges	6	7^{8}
(Romania) FC Jianu	3	6^{6}
(Turkey) E Kırkın	4	2
2	(Turkey) C İlkel	6	6

Second round
WC	(Turkey) Y Erel	6	5	6
(Japan) H Moriya	3	7	2
(France) G Blancaneaux	3	4
(United Kingdom) R Peniston	6	6
(Russia) E Karlovskiy	6	6
LL	(Germany) J Härteis	3	1
(Portugal) N Borges	6	6
2	(Turkey) C İlkel	3	1

Quarterfinals
WC	(Turkey) Y Erel	2	6	7
(United Kingdom) R Peniston	6	3	5
(Russia) E Karlovskiy	7^{7}	6
(Portugal) N Borges	6^{5}	3

Semifinals
WC	(Turkey) Y Erel	6	6^{6}	3
(Russia) E Karlovskiy	3	7^{8}	6
