= 2025 Brawo Open =

- Date: 7–12 July
- Edition: 31st
- Surface: Clay
- Location: Braunschweig, Germany

Champions

Singles
- (Argentina) Mariano Navone

Doubles
- (United States) Vasil Kirkov / (Netherlands) Bart Stevens
- Brawo Open

The 2025 Brawo Open was a professional tennis tournament played on clay courts. It was the 31st edition of the tournament which was part of the 2025 ATP Challenger Tour. It took place in Braunschweig, Germany between 7 and 12 July 2025.

== Singles main-draw entrants ==
=== Seeds ===
Country	Player	Rank^{1}	Seed
ARG	Tomás Martín Etcheverry	53	1
ESP	Roberto Carballés Baena	74	2
BEL	Raphaël Collignon	85	3
ARG	Mariano Navone	91	4
NED	Botic van de Zandschulp	92	5
AUT	Filip Misolic	111	6
ARG	Juan Manuel Cerúndolo	112	7
ITA	Francesco Passaro	131	8

- ^{1} Rankings are as of 30 June 2025.

=== Other entrants ===
The following players received wildcards into the singles main draw:

- (Germany) Diego Dedura
- (Germany) Tom Gentzsch
- (Germany) Christoph Negritu

The following players received entry into the singles main draw as alternates:

- (Bosnia and Herzegovina) Nerman Fatić
- (Netherlands) Max Houkes
- (Georgia (country)) Saba Purtseladze
- (Sweden) Elias Ymer

The following players received entry from the qualifying draw:

- (Argentina) Alex Barrena
- (Slovakia) Norbert Gombos
- (Spain) David Jordà Sanchis
- (Slovakia) Alex Molčan
- (Germany) Rudolf Molleker
- (Germany) Mika Petkovic

== Champions ==
=== Singles ===
- (Argentina) Mariano Navone def. (Argentina) Juan Manuel Cerúndolo 6–3, 7–5.

=== Doubles ===
- (United States) Vasil Kirkov / (Netherlands) Bart Stevens def. (Peru) Alexander Merino / (Germany) Christoph Negritu 6–2, 6–3.
