= 2025 Brawo Open – Singles =

Singles
- 2025 Brawo Open

Final
- Champion: (Argentina) Mariano Navone
- Runner-up: (Argentina) Juan Manuel Cerúndolo
- Score: 6–3, 7–5

Events
Singles	Doubles
- Brawo Open

Roberto Carballés Baena was the defending champion but retired from his quarterfinal match against Alex Molčan.

Mariano Navone won the title after defeating Juan Manuel Cerúndolo 6–3, 7–5 in the final.

== Seeds ==
1. (Argentina) Tomás Martín Etcheverry (first round)
2. (Spain) Roberto Carballés Baena (quarterfinals, retired)
3. (Belgium) Raphaël Collignon (quarterfinals)
4. (Argentina) Mariano Navone (champion)
5. (Netherlands) Botic van de Zandschulp (quarterfinals)
6. (Austria) Filip Misolic (semifinals)
7. (Argentina) Juan Manuel Cerúndolo (final)
8. (Italy) Francesco Passaro (second round)

== Draw ==
Key

- Q = Qualifier
- WC = Wild card
- LL = Lucky loser
- Alt = Alternate
- ITF = ITF entry
- PR = Protected ranking
- SR = Special ranking
- SE = Special exempt
- JE = Junior exempt
- JR = Junior Accelerator Programme entrant
- CO = College Accelerator Programme entrant
- NG = Next Gen Accelerator Program entrant
- w/o = Walkover
- r = Retired
- d = Defaulted

=== Finals ===
Semifinals
6	(Austria) Filip Misolic	7	4	3
4	(Argentina) Mariano Navone	5	6	6
7	(Argentina) Juan Manuel Cerúndolo	1	6	6
Q	(Slovakia) Alex Molčan	6	4	2

Final
4	(Argentina) Mariano Navone	6	7
7	(Argentina) Juan Manuel Cerúndolo	3	5

=== Top half ===
First round
1	(Argentina) TM Etcheverry	4	4
(France) L Pavlovic	6	6
(France) C Tabur	3	4
(Germany) Y Hanfmann	6	6
WC	(Germany) T Gentzsch	6^{3}	6	6
Q	(Germany) R Molleker	7^{7}	2	2
(Italy) A Pellegrino	4	1
6	(Austria) F Misolic	6	6
4	(Argentina) M Navone	7	6
(Peru) I Buse	5	2
WC	(Germany) D Dedura	6	6
Alt	(Sweden) E Ymer	3	3
Q	(Spain) D Jordà Sanchis	6	7^{9}
(Germany) J Engel	2	6^{7}
(United Kingdom) J Choinski	1	0
5	(Netherlands) B van de Zandschulp	6	6

Second round
(France) L Pavlovic	6^{2}	4
(Germany) Y Hanfmann	7^{7}	6
WC	(Germany) T Gentzsch	6^{3}	3
6	(Austria) F Misolic	7^{7}	6
4	(Argentina) M Navone	6	6
WC	(Germany) D Dedura	1	2
Q	(Spain) D Jordà Sanchis	1	1
5	(Netherlands) B van de Zandschulp	6	6

Quarterfinals
(Germany) Y Hanfmann	6^{3}	5
6	(Austria) F Misolic	7^{7}	7
4	(Argentina) M Navone	6	7
5	(Netherlands) B van de Zandschulp	3	5

Semifinals
6	(Austria) F Misolic	7	4	3
4	(Argentina) M Navone	5	6	6

=== Bottom half ===
First round
7	(Argentina) JM Cerúndolo	6	6
(Italy) F Arnaboldi	3	3
(Argentina) RA Burruchaga	6	3	5
Alt	(Bosnia and Herzegovina) N Fatić	4	6	7
Q	(Germany) Mika Petkovic	3	4
Alt	(Netherlands) M Houkes	6	6
Q	(Slovakia) N Gombos	5	2
3	(Belgium) R Collignon	7	6
8	(Italy) F Passaro	7^{7}	6^{4}	7^{7}
(France) L Van Assche	6^{2}	7^{7}	6^{2}
Alt	(Georgia (country)) S Purtseladze	4	3
Q	(Slovakia) A Molčan	6	6
(Brazil) T Monteiro	4	2
WC	(Germany) C Negritu	6	6
Q	(Argentina) A Barrena	6^{4}	6^{6}
2	(Spain) R Carballés Baena	7^{7}	7^{8}

Second round
7	(Argentina) JM Cerúndolo	6	6
Alt	(Bosnia and Herzegovina) N Fatić	3	4
Alt	(Netherlands) M Houkes	6	4	1
3	(Belgium) R Collignon	4	6	6
8	(Italy) F Passaro	3	3
Q	(Slovakia) A Molčan	6	6
WC	(Germany) C Negritu	6	3	2
2	(Spain) R Carballés Baena	1	6	6

Quarterfinals
7	(Argentina) JM Cerúndolo	4	6	6
3	(Belgium) R Collignon	6	3	4
Q	(Slovakia) A Molčan	6	1
2	(Spain) R Carballés Baena	3	0^{r}

Semifinals
7	(Argentina) JM Cerúndolo	1	6	6
Q	(Slovakia) A Molčan	6	4	2
