= 2025 Challenger de Santiago – Doubles =

Doubles
- 2025 Challenger de Santiago

Final
- Champions: (United States) Vasil Kirkov (Chile) Matías Soto
- Runners-up: (Brazil) Mateus Alves (Brazil) Luís Britto
- Score: 6–4, 6–3

Events
Singles	Doubles
← 2024 ·	Challenger de Santiago	· 2026 →

Fernando Romboli and Marcelo Zormann were the defending champions but only Zormann chose to defend his title, partnering Cristian Rodríguez. They lost in the semifinals to Vasil Kirkov and Matías Soto.

Kirkov and Soto won the title after defeating Mateus Alves and Luís Britto 6–4, 6–3 in the final.

== Seeds ==
1. (Poland) Karol Drzewiecki / (Poland) Piotr Matuszewski (semifinals)
2. (Colombia) Cristian Rodríguez / (Brazil) Marcelo Zormann (semifinals)
3. (Bolivia) Boris Arias / (Bolivia) Federico Zeballos (first round)
4. (United States) Vasil Kirkov / (Chile) Matías Soto (champions)

== Draw ==
=== Key ===
- Q = Qualifier
- WC = Wild card
- LL = Lucky loser
- Alt = Alternate
- SE = Special exempt
- PR = Protected ranking
- ITF = ITF entry
- JE = Junior exempt
- w/o = Walkover
- r = Retired
- d = Defaulted
- SR = Special ranking

=== Draw ===
First round
1	(Poland) K Drzewiecki (Poland) P Matuszewski	6	6
(Brazil) P Boscardin Dias (Colombia) DE Galán	1	4
(Argentina) G Durán (Argentina) R Olivo	6^{4}	4
(Bolivia) M Dellien (United States) E Nava	7^{7}	6
3	(Bolivia) B Arias (Bolivia) F Zeballos	6	3	[8]
(Brazil) M Alves (Brazil) L Britto	2	6	[10]
(Argentina) Leonardo Aboian (Argentina) G Villanueva	1	2
Alt	(Brazil) JL Reis da Silva (Brazil) P Sakamoto	6	6
(Brazil) M Pucinelli de Almeida (Argentina) JB Torres	3	4
(Japan) S Watanabe (Japan) T Yuzuki	6	6
WC	(United States) Milledge Cossu (Chile) Amador Salazar	5	1
4	(United States) V Kirkov (Chile) M Soto	7	6
(Argentina) A Collarini (Kazakhstan) D Popko	4	2
(Peru) G Bueno (Ecuador) Á Guillén Meza	6	6
PR	(Peru) A Huertas del Pino (Peru) C Huertas del Pino	4	2
2	(Colombia) C Rodríguez (Brazil) M Zormann	6	6

Quarterfinals
1	(Poland) K Drzewiecki (Poland) P Matuszewski	7	6
(Bolivia) M Dellien (United States) E Nava	5	4
(Brazil) M Alves (Brazil) L Britto	6	6
Alt	(Brazil) JL Reis da Silva (Brazil) P Sakamoto	3	4
(Japan) S Watanabe (Japan) T Yuzuki	6	6^{9}	[8]
4	(United States) V Kirkov (Chile) M Soto	3	7^{11}	[10]
(Peru) G Bueno (Ecuador) Á Guillén Meza	4	3
2	(Colombia) C Rodríguez (Brazil) M Zormann	6	6

Semifinals
1	(Poland) K Drzewiecki (Poland) P Matuszewski	5	6	[7]
(Brazil) M Alves (Brazil) L Britto	7	3	[10]
4	(United States) V Kirkov (Chile) M Soto	6	6
2	(Colombia) C Rodríguez (Brazil) M Zormann	3	4

Final
(Brazil) M Alves (Brazil) L Britto	4	3
4	(United States) V Kirkov (Chile) M Soto	6	6
