= 2021 Bahrain Ministry of Interior Tennis Challenger =

- Date: 22–28 November
- Edition: 1st
- Surface: Hard
- Location: Manama, Bahrain

Champions

Singles
- (India) Ramkumar Ramanathan

Doubles
- (Portugal) Nuno Borges / (Portugal) Francisco Cabral
Bahrain Ministry of Interior Tennis Challenger	· 2023 →

The 2021 Bahrain Ministry of Interior Tennis Challenger was a professional tennis tournament played on hard courts. It was the first edition of the tournament which was part of the 2021 ATP Challenger Tour. It took place in Manama, Bahrain between 22 and 28 November 2021.

== Singles main-draw entrants ==
=== Seeds ===
Country	Player	Rank^{1}	Seed
~~MDA~~	~~Radu Albot~~	~~137~~	~~1~~
TUR	Cem İlkel	145	2
TUR	Altuğ Çelikbilek	161	3
AUS	Christopher O'Connell	174	4
IND	Prajnesh Gunneswaran	197	5
IND	Ramkumar Ramanathan	222	6
GBR	Jay Clarke	229	7
BIH	Mirza Bašić	234	8

- ^{1} Rankings are as of 15 November 2021.

=== Other entrants ===
The following players received wildcards into the singles main draw:

- (Bahrain) Hasan Abdulnabi
- (Turkey) Yankı Erel
- (Spain) Iván Marrero Curbelo

The following player received entry into the singles main draw as an alternate:

- (India) Mukund Sasikumar

The following players received entry from the qualifying draw:

- (Czech Republic) Marek Gengel
- (Bulgaria) Alexandar Lazarov
- (Austria) Maximilian Neuchrist
- (Ukraine) Vladyslav Orlov

The following player received entry into the singles main draw as a lucky loser:

- (Germany) Johannes Härteis

== Champions ==
=== Singles ===
- (India) Ramkumar Ramanathan def. (Russia) Evgeny Karlovskiy 6–1, 6–4.

=== Doubles ===
- (Portugal) Nuno Borges / (Portugal) Francisco Cabral def. (Austria) Maximilian Neuchrist / (Greece) Michail Pervolarakis 7–5, 6–7^{(5–7)}, [10–8].
