= Vasil Kirkov =

American tennis player (born 1999)

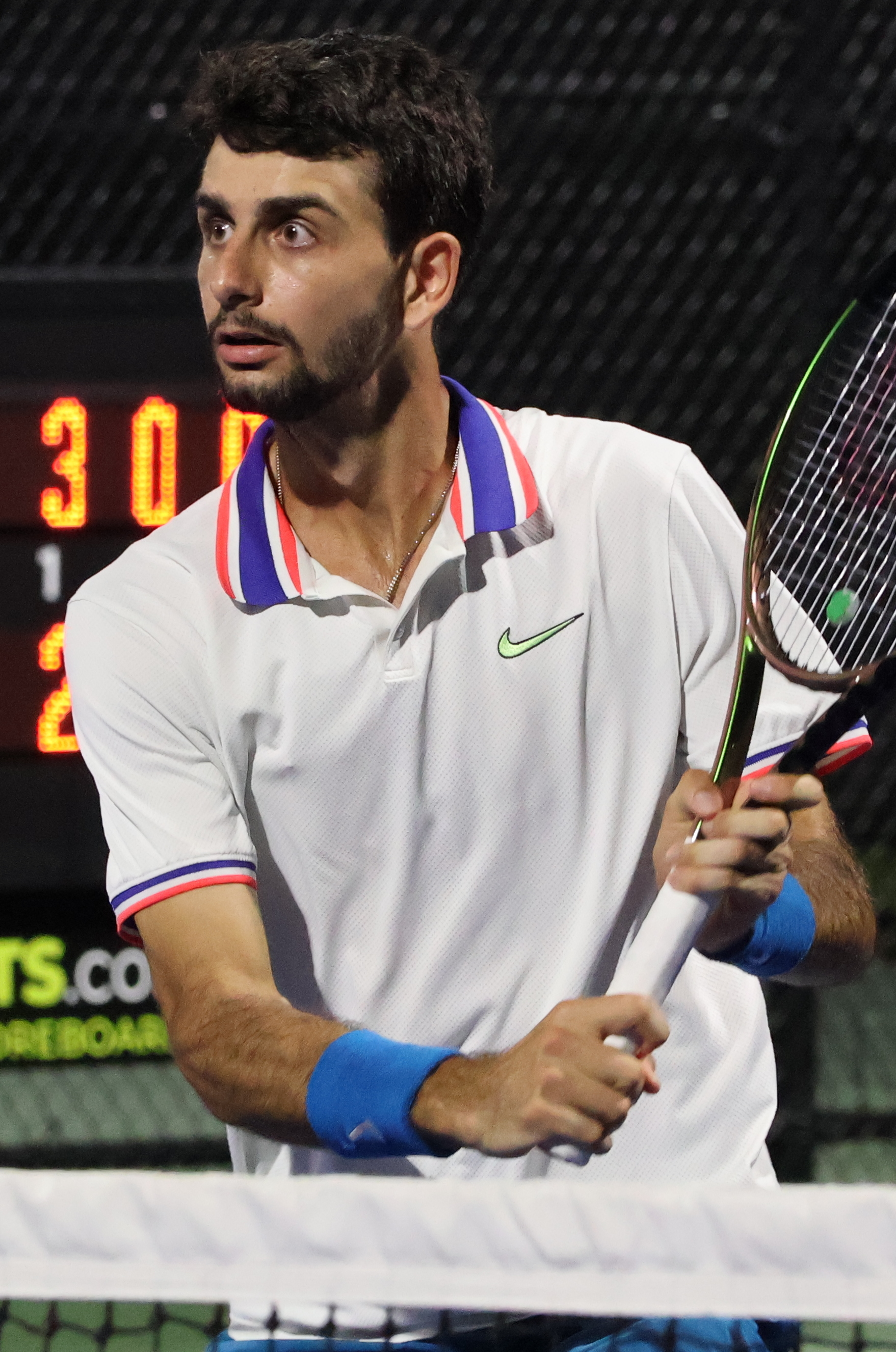
- Kirkov at the 2023 Cary Challenger II
- Country (sports): United States
- Residence: Tampa, United States
- Born: March 13, 1999 (age 27) Asenovgrad, Bulgaria
- Height: 1.85 m (6 ft 1 in)
- Turned pro: 2016
- Plays: Right-handed (two-handed backhand)
- Coach: Sylvain Guichard, Stoyan Kirkov
- Prize money: US $409,292

Singles
- Career record: 0-0
- Career titles: 2 ITF
- Highest ranking: No. 439 (November 22, 2021)

Doubles
- Career record: 32–30 (at ATP Tour level, Grand Slam level, and in Davis Cup)
- Career titles: 11 Challengers, 8 ITF
- Highest ranking: No. 49 (August 10, 2026)
- Current ranking: No. 57 (November 9, 2026)

Grand Slam doubles results
- Australian Open: 2R (2026)
- French Open: 2R (2026)
- Wimbledon: 1R (2025, 2026)
- US Open: 3R (2023)
- Last updated on: 10 November 2026.

Vasil Kirkov (born March 13, 1999) is a Bulgarian-born American professional tennis player who specializes in doubles. He has a career high ATP doubles ranking of world No. 49 achieved on 10 August 2026. He has reached three ATP doubles finals. Kirkov has won 11 doubles ATP Challenger Tour titles, including 7 titles in 2025, tied for the second-most titles for that season. He also has a career high singles ranking of No. 439 achieved in November 2021.

== Career ==
Kirkov was awarded a qualifying wildcard at the 2016 US Open having reached the final of the USTA National Boy's 18 Championships in Kalamazoo, Michigan.

Kirkov made his Grand Slam doubles main draw debut at the 2017 US Open with Danny Thomas after receiving a wildcard for winning the USTA Boy's 18 National hardcourt Championships in Kalamazoo with Thomas.

In December 2019, Kirkov won the M15 in Cancun, Mexico, his first-ever ITF World Tennis Tour title as the No. 4 seed defeating No. 3 seed Nick Chappell in a close match with a scoreline of 6–7(3), 7–6(8), 7–6(1).

Kirkov won his first Challenger title at the 2023 Challenger Santa Fe partnering Chilean Matias Soto, and his second title at the 2023 Salinas Challenger partnering Alfredo Perez, after defeating Ángel Díaz Jalil and Álvaro Guillén Meza in the final. He reached the third round at the 2023 US Open after receiving a wildcard partnering Denis Kudla but lost to Ivan Dodig and Austin Krajicek.

He entered the ATP 500 2024 Mubadala Citi DC Open in Washington as a lucky loser partnering Evan King but they lost to Lloyd Glasspool and Santiago Gonzalez in the first round. He also received a wildcard in doubles for the 2024 US Open partnering Christian Harrison.

In March 2025, in Latin America, Kirkov won three back-to-back Challenger doubles titles in Santiago, Asunción, Paraguay and in Concepción, Chile partnering again with Chilean Matias Soto. Following two challenger finals in Asia, Kirkov reached the top 100 in the doubles rankings on 5 May 2025 at world No. 98. He won his eight title at the Challenger 100, the 2025 Wuxi Open, with Bart Stevens.

== ATP Tour finals ==
=== Doubles: 3 (3 runner-ups) ===
Legend Grand Slam tournaments (0–0) ATP Masters 1000 (0–0) ATP 500 (0–0) ATP 250 (0–3)	Finals by surface Hard (0–2) Clay (0–1) Grass (0–0)

Result	W–L	Date	Tournament	Tier	Surface	Partner	Opponents	Score
Loss	0–1	Sep 2025	Chengdu Open, China	250 Series	Hard	(Netherlands) Bart Stevens	(Germany) Constantin Frantzen (Netherlands) Robin Haase	6–4, 3–6, [7–10]
Loss	0–2	Oct 2025	Stockholm Open, Sweden	250 Series	Hard (i)	(Netherlands) Bart Stevens	(Austria) Alexander Erler (United States) Robert Galloway	3–6, 2–6
Loss	0–3	Mar 2026	Grand Prix Hassan II, Morocco	250 Series	Clay	(Netherlands) Bart Stevens	(United States) Robert Cash (United States) JJ Tracy	2–6, 3–6

== Junior Grand Slam finals ==
=== Doubles: 1 (1 final) ===
Result	Year	Tournament	Surface	Partner	Opponents	Score
Loss	2017	French Open	Clay	(United States) Danny Thomas	(Germany) Nicola Kuhn (Hungary) Zsombor Piros	4–6, 4–6

== ATP Challenger and ITF Tour finals ==
=== Doubles: 30 (19 titles, 11 runner-ups) ===
Legend ATP Challenger (11–11) ITF Futures (8–0)

==== ATP Challenger Finals (11–11) ====
Finals by surface
Hard (4–8)
Clay (7–3)

Result	W–L	Date	Tournament	Tier	Surface	Partner	Opponents	Score
Win	1–0	Jul 2023	Santa Fe, Argentina	Challenger	Clay	(Chile) Matías Soto	(Uruguay) Ignacio Carou (Argentina) Ignacio Monzón	7–6^{(7–3)}, 6–2
Win	2–0	Jul 2023	Salinas, Ecuador	Challenger	Clay	(United States) Alfredo Perez	(Ecuador) Ángel Díaz Jalil (Ecuador) Álvaro Guillén Meza	7–5, 7–5
Loss	2–1	Jul 2023	Lexington, US	Challenger	Hard	(United States) George Goldhoff	(United States) Eliot Spizzirri (United States) Tyler Zink	6–4, 3–6, [8–10]
Loss	2–2	Oct 2023	Fairfield, US	Challenger	Hard	(United States) Denis Kudla	(United States) Evan King (United States) Reese Stalder	5–7, 3–6
Win	3–2	Jan 2024	Tenerife, Spain	Challenger	Hard	(Venezuela) Luis David Martínez	(Poland) Karol Drzewiecki (Poland) Piotr Matuszewski	3–6, 6–4, [10–3]
Loss	3–3	Feb 2024	Manama, Bahrain	Challenger	Hard	(Finland) Patrik Niklas-Salminen	(Greece) Petros Tsitsipas (Spain) Sergio Martos Gornes	6–3, 3–6, [8–10]
Loss	3–4	Nov 2024	Seoul, Korea	Challenger	Hard	(Netherlands) Bart Stevens	(India) Saketh Myneni (India) Ramkumar Ramanathan	4–6, 6–4, [3–10]
Win	4–4	Nov 2024	Kobe, Japan	Challenger	Hard (i)	(Netherlands) Bart Stevens	(Japan) Kaichi Uchida (Japan) Takeru Yuzuki	7–6^{(9–7)}, 7–5
Loss	4–5	Feb 2025	Glasgow, United Kingdom	Challenger	Hard	(United Kingdom) Marcus Willis	(Israel) Daniel Cukierman (United Kingdom) Joshua Paris	7–5, 4–6, [10–12]
Win	5–5	Mar 2025	Santiago, Chile	Challenger	Clay	(Chile) Matías Soto	(Brazil) Mateus Alves (Brazil) Luís Britto	6–4, 6–3
Win	6–5	Mar 2025	Asunción, Paraguay	Challenger	Clay	(Chile) Matías Soto	(Argentina) Mariano Kestelboim (Argentina) Guillermo Durán	6–3, 6–4
Win	7–5	Mar 2025	Concepción, Chile	Challenger	Clay	(Chile) Matías Soto	(Japan) Takeru Yuzuki (Japan) Seita Watanabe	6–2, 6–4
Loss	7–6	Apr 2025	Gwangju, South Korea	Challenger	Hard	(Netherlands) Bart Stevens	(Chinese Taipei) Ray Ho (Australia) Matthew Romios	3–6, 6–7^{(6–8)}
Loss	7–7	May 2025	Guangzhou, China	Challenger	Hard	(Netherlands) Bart Stevens	(Chinese Taipei) Ray Ho (Australia) Matthew Romios	3–6, 4–6
Win	8–7	May 2025	Wuxi, China	Challenger	Hard	(Netherlands) Bart Stevens	(Chinese Taipei) Ray Ho (Australia) Matthew Romios	3–6, 7–5, [10–6]
Win	9–7	Jun 2025	Bad Rappenau, Germany	Challenger	Clay	(Netherlands) Bart Stevens	(Germany) Jakob Schnaitter (Germany) Mark Wallner	7–6^{(7–5)}, 4–6, [10–7]
Loss	9–8	Jun 2025	Perugia, Italy	Challenger	Clay	(Netherlands) Robin Haase	(Monaco) Romain Arneodo (France) Manuel Guinard	6–3, 3–6, [5–10]
Win	10–8	Jul 2025	Braunschweig, Germany	Challenger	Clay	(Netherlands) Bart Stevens	(Peru) Alexander Merino (Germany) Christoph Negritu	6–2, 6–3
Loss	10–9	Aug 2025	Hagen, Germany	Challenger	Clay	(Netherlands) Bart Stevens	(Germany) Hendrik Jebens (France) Albano Olivetti	4–6, 7–6 ^{(7–2)}, [8–10]
Win	11–9	Oct 2025	Roanne, France	Challenger	Hard (i)	(Netherlands) Bart Stevens	(Belgium) Joran Vliegen (United States) Jackson Withrow	4–6, 6–1, [10–4]
Loss	11–10	Jan 2026	Manama, Bahrain	Challenger	Hard	(Netherlands) Bart Stevens	(India) Sriram Balaji (Austria) Neil Oberleitner	6–7 ^{(1–7)}, 4–6
Loss	11–11	May 2026	Aix-en-Provence, France	Challenger	Clay	(Netherlands) Bart Stevens	(United States) Robert Cash (United States) JJ Tracy	7–5, 4–6 [4–10]
