= Bart Stevens =

Dutch tennis player (born 1998)

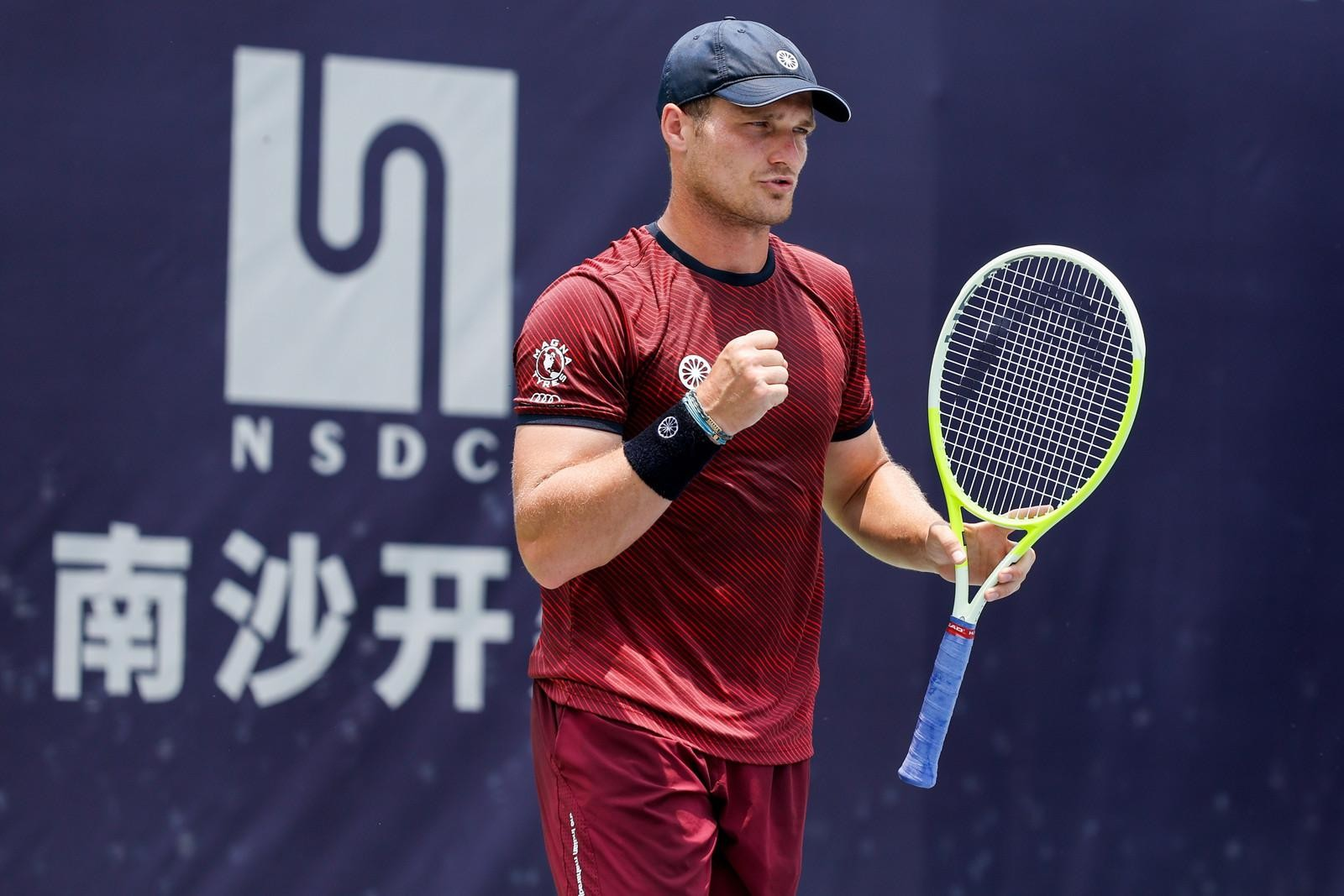
- Stevens winner at the Wuxi Open 2025
- Country (sports): Netherlands
- Born: 29 January 1998 (age 28) Waalwijk, Netherlands
- Height: 1.80 m (5 ft 11 in)
- Plays: Right-handed (two-handed backhand)
- Coach: Willem-Jan van Hulst, Christos Palazis
- Prize money: US $594,676

Singles
- Career record: 0–0
- Career titles: 0 Challenger, 0 Futures
- Highest ranking: No. 736 (14 October 2019)

Doubles
- Career record: 42–50
- Career titles: 14 Challenger, 10 Futures
- Highest ranking: No. 48 (10 August 2026)
- Current ranking: No. 52 (16 November 2026)

Grand Slam doubles results
- Australian Open: 2R (2026)
- French Open: 2R (2026)
- Wimbledon: QF (2023)
- US Open: 2R (2023, 2025)
- Last updated on: 16 November 2026 (AA).

Bart Stevens (born 29 January 1998) is a Dutch tennis player who specializes in doubles. He reached his career-high ATP doubles ranking of world No. 48 on 10 August 2026. He also has a career high singles ranking of No. 736 achieved on 14 October 2019. Stevens reached five ATP Tour finals, and won 14 ATP Challenger Tour and ten ITF titles.

== Professional career ==
=== ITF Men's World Tennis Tour ===
Stevens won ten ITF Men's World Tennis Tour doubles titles (partnering Marc Dijkhuizen (M15), Mats Hermans (M15) and Jesper de Jong (M15 and M25).

=== ATP Challenger Tour ===
Stevens won fourteen ATP Challenger doubles titles at:

1. 2021 Open de Rennes
2. 2021 Challenger Ciudad de Guayaquil
3. 2022 Santa Cruz Challenger II
4. 2022 Garden Open
5. 2023 Bahrain MIO Tennis Challenger
6. 2023 Danderyd-Good to Great
7. 2024 Split Open
8. 2024 Sauerland Open
9. 2024 Kobe Challenger
10. 2025 Wuxi Open
11. 2025 Neckarcup 2.0
12. 2025 Brawo Open
13. 2025 Open de Roanne
14. 2026 Open de Rennes

=== ATP Tour ===
Stevens made his ATP Tour qualifying debut as a pair partnering Van Rijthoven at the 2022 ABN AMRO Rotterdam, and main draw debut at the 2022 Libéma Open. Best performances in the ATP Tour:

- in France-Montpellier at the 2025 Open Occitanie, Tallon Griekspoor and Stevens reached for the first time the finals of an ATP Tour 250 tournament but lost in an all-Dutch match to Robin Haase and Botic van de Zandschulp (7–6^{(9–7)}, 3–6, [5–10]).
- in China-Chengdu at the Chengdu Open, Stevens and Vasil Kirkov lost in the final to Constantin Frantzen and Robin Haase (6–4, 3–6, [7–10]).
- in Sweden-Stockholm at the Stockholm Open, Stevens and Kirkov lost in the final to Alexander Erler and Robert Galloway (3–6, 2–6).
- in Morocco-Marrakech at the 2026 Grand Prix Hassan II Stevens and Kirkov lost in the final to Robert Cash and James "JJ" Tracy (2–6, 3–6).
- in Belgium-Brussels at the 2026 European Open Stevens and Sadio Doumbia lost in the final to Robert Galloway and Constantin Frantzen (7–6^{(7-4)}, 4–6, [8–10]).

=== Grand Slams ===
Roland Garros:

- Roland Garros-2023: Stevens made his Grand Slam debut at the French Open together with Tallon Griekspoor. In the first round, they were defeated by the tenth seeded duo and eventual semifinalists Marcel Granollers and Horacio Zeballos.
- Roland Garros-2024: Griekspoor and Stevens-withdrawal/replaced by André Göransson and David Pel.
- Roland Garros-2025: Griekspoor and Stevens were defeated by Jakob Schnaitter and Mark Wallner.
- Roland Garros-2026: in the first round, Kirkov en Stevens defeated the all-French Moutet and Van Assche. In the second round, they lost to the eventual winners Granollers and Zeballos.

Wimbledon:

- Wimbledon-2023: Stevens reached the quarterfinals on his Wimbledon debut together with Tallon Griekspoor. In the first round, they defeated third seeded duo Rajeev Ram and Joe Salisbury. After winning Simone Bolelli & Andrea Vavassori (R32) and Marcelo Melo & John Peers (R16) Griekspoor and Stevens lost in the quarterfinals to the sixth seeded pair of Rohan Bopanna and Matthew Ebden.
- Wimbledon-2024: Griekspoor and Stevens lost in the first round of Fabrice Martin and Matwé Middelkoop.
- Wimbledon-2025: Vasil Kirkov and Stevens lost in the first round of Wimbledon winners Lloyd Glasspool and Julian Cash.
- Wimbledon-2026: Kirkov and Stevens lost in the first round of thirteenth seeded pair of Sadio Doumbia and Fabien Reboul.

US Open:

- US Open-2023: Stevens reached the second round on his US Open debut with Matteo Arnaldi. In the first round, they defeated Sebastián Báez and Luis David Martínez. In the next round Arnaldi and Stevens lost to the fourth seeded pair of Marcelo Arévalo and Jean-Julien Rojer.
- US Open-2025: Stevens reached the second round with Vasil Kirkov. In the first round, they defeated Rithvik Choudary Bollipalli and Sriram Balaji. In the second round (R32) Kirkov and Stevens lost to the ninth seeded pair of Hugo Nys and Édouard Roger-Vasselin.

Australian Open:

- Australian Open-2024: Stevens made his debut at the Australian Open with Tallon Griekspoor. In the first round, they were defeated by the 11th seeded duo of Lloyd Glasspool and Jean-Julien Rojer.
- Australian Open-2026: Stevens reached the second round with Vasil Kirkov. In the first round, they defeated Gonzalo Escobar and Miguel Ángel Reyes-Varela. In the second round (R32) Kirkov and Stevens lost to the sixteenth seeded pair of Austin Krajicek and Nikola Mektić.

=== Dutch Championships ===
Together with Jesper de Jong, Stevens reached the men's doubles final in December 2021.

== ATP career finals ==
=== Doubles: 5 (0 titles, 5 runner-up) ===
Legend Grand Slam tournaments (0–0) ATP Tour Masters 1000 (0–0) ATP Tour 500 Series (0–0) ATP Tour 250 Series (0–5)	Finals by surface Hard (0–4) Clay (0–1)

Result	W–L	Date	Tournament	Tier	Surface	Partner	Opponents	Score
Loss	0–1	Feb 2025	Open Occitanie, France	250 Series	Hard (i)	(Netherlands) Tallon Griekspoor	(Netherlands) Robin Haase (Netherlands) Botic van de Zandschulp	7–6^{(9–7)}, 3–6, [5–10]
Loss	0–2	Sep 2025	Chengdu Open, China	250 Series	Hard	(United States) Vasil Kirkov	(Germany) Constantin Frantzen (Netherlands) Robin Haase	6–4, 3–6, [7–10]
Loss	0–3	Oct 2025	Stockholm Open, Sweden	250 Series	Hard (i)	(United States) Vasil Kirkov	(Austria) Alexander Erler (United States) Robert Galloway	3–6, 2–6
Loss	0–4	Mar 2026	Grand Prix Hassan II, Morocco	250 Series	Clay	(United States) Vasil Kirkov	(United States) Robert Cash (United States) JJ Tracy	2–6, 3–6
Loss	0–5	Oct 2026	European Open, Belgium	250 Series	Hard (i)	(France) Sadio Doumbia	(Germany) Constantin Frantzen (United States) Robert Galloway	7–6^{(7-4)}, 4–6, [8–10]

== ATP Challengers and ITF Futures finals ==
=== Doubles: 44 (24 titles, 20 runner-ups) ===
Legend ATP Challenger (14–13) ITF Futures Tour/World Tennis Tour (10–7)	Finals by surface Hard (8–9) Clay (16–11)

Result	W–L	Date	Tournament	Tier	Surface	Partner	Opponents	Score
Loss	0–1	Aug 2016	Germany F9, Essen	Futures	Clay	(Netherlands) Michiel de Krom	(Australia) Steven de Waard (Germany) Andreas Mies	5–7, 4–6
Loss	0–2	Aug 2017	Finland F3, Helsinki	Futures	Clay	(Netherlands) Marc Dijkhuizen	(Italy) Filippo Baldi (Italy) Marco Bortolotti	4–6, 6–7^{(5–7)}
Win	1–2	Jul 2018	Estonia F1, Pärnu	Futures	Clay	(Netherlands) Marc Dijkhuizen	(Russia) Markos Kalovelonis (Russia) Denis Klok	6–4, 6–2
Loss	1–3	Jul 2018	Lithuania F1, Vilnius	Futures	Clay	(Netherlands) Marc Dijkhuizen	(Brazil) M. Pucinelli de Almeida (Brazil) J.L. Reis da Silva	2–6, 2–6
Win	2–3	Aug 2018	Finland F1, Kaarina	Futures	Clay	(Netherlands) Marc Dijkhuizen	(Brazil) Eduardo Dischinger (Netherlands) Mats Hermans	6–2, 3–6, [10–2]
Loss	2–4	Sep 2018	Switzerland F4, Neuchâtel	Futures	Clay	(Netherlands) Marc Dijkhuizen	(Brazil) Eduardo Dischinger (Brazil) Diego Matos	3–6, 7–6^{(8–6)}, [7–10]
Loss	2–5	Dec 2018	Turkey F40, Antalya	Futures	Clay	(Netherlands) Mats Hermans	(Sweden) Dragoș N. Mădăraș (Czech Republic) Tadeáš Paroulek	Walkover
Win	3–5	Jul 2019	M15 Tabarka, Tunisia	WTT	Clay	(Netherlands) Mats Hermans	(Jordan) Mousa Alkotop (Russia) Alexander Boborykin	7–6^{(7–4)}, 6–2
Win	4–5	Aug 2019	M15 Tabarka, Tunisia	WTT	Clay	(Netherlands) Mats Hermans	(Jordan) Mousa Alkotop (Russia) Alexander Boborykin	6–4, 6–0
Win	5–5	Aug 2019	M15 Oldenzaal, Netherlands	WTT	Clay	(Netherlands) Mats Hermans	(Germany) Alexander Mannapov (Ukraine) Vitalii Shcherba	4–6, 6–4, [10–6]
Win	6–5	Aug 2019	M15 Haren, Netherlands	WTT	Clay	(Netherlands) Mats Hermans	(Germany) Lasse Muscheites (Germany) Stefan Seifert	6–3, 6–2
Win	7–5	Sep 2019	M15 Antalya, Tunisia	WTT	Clay	(Netherlands) Mats Hermans	(Turkey) Sarp Ağabigün (Germany) Paul Wörner	6–1, 7–6^{(7–1)}
Win	8–5	Oct 2019	M15 Antalya, Tunisia	WTT	Clay	(Netherlands) Mats Hermans	(Turkey) Tuna Altuna (Germany) Peter Heller	7–6^{(7–5)}, 3–6, [10–7]
Loss	8–6	Nov 2019	M15 Antalya, Tunisia	WTT	Clay	(Netherlands) Mats Hermans	(Kazakhstan) Grigoriy Lomakin (Ukraine) Oleg Prihodko	4–6, 3–6
Win	9–6	Jan 2020	M15 Monastir, Tunisia	WTT	Hard	(Netherlands) Jesper de Jong	(United Kingdom) Luke Johnson (France) Hugo Voljacques	6–4, 3–6, [10–8]
Loss	9–7	Feb 2020	M25 Sunderland, United Kingdom	WTT	Hard (i)	(Netherlands) Jesper de Jong	(Poland) Szymon Walków (Poland) Jan Zieliński	4–6, 4–6
Win	10–7	Jul 2021	M25 The Hague, Netherlands	WTT	Clay	(Netherlands) Jesper de Jong	(Netherlands) Gijs Brouwer (Netherlands) Jelle Sels	6–3, 6–4
Win	11–7	Sep 2021	Rennes, France	Challenger	Hard (i)	(Netherlands) Tim van Rijthoven	(Czech Republic) Marek Gengel (Czech Republic) Tomáš Macháč	6–7^{(2–7)}, 7–5, [10–3]
Loss	11–8	Sep 2021	Braga, Portugal	Challenger	Clay	(Netherlands) Jesper de Jong	(Portugal) Nuno Borges (Portugal) Francisco Cabral	6–3, 6–7^{(4–7)}, [10–5]
Win	12–8	Nov 2021	Guayaquil, Ecuador	Challenger	Clay	(Netherlands) Jesper de Jong	(Ecuador) Diego Hidalgo (Colombia) Cristian Rodríguez	7–5, 6–2
Win	13–8	Mar 2021	Santa Cruz de la Sierra, Bolivia	Challenger	Clay	(Netherlands) Jesper de Jong	(Colombia) Nicolás Barrientos (Mexico) M.A. Reyes-Varela	6–4, 3–6, [10–6]
Win	14–8	Apr 2022	Rome, Italy	Challenger	Clay	(Netherlands) Jesper de Jong	(France) Sadio Doumbia (France) Fabien Reboul	3–6, 7–5, [10–8]
Loss	14–9	May 2022	Heilbronner, Germany	Challenger	Clay	(Netherlands) Jelle Sels	(Colombia) Nicolás Barrientos (Mexico) M.A. Reyes-Varela	5–7, 3–6
Loss	14–10	Jan 2023	Oeiras, Portugal	Challenger	Hard (i)	(Finland) Patrik Niklas-Salminen	(Netherlands) Sander Arends (Netherlands) David Pel	3–6, 6–7^{(3–7)}
Loss	14–11	Jan 2023	Tenerife, Spain	Challenger	Hard	(Finland) Patrik Niklas-Salminen	(Romania) Victor Vlad Cornea (Spain) S. Martos Gornés	3–6, 4–6
Win	15–11	Feb 2023	Manama, Bahrain	Challenger	Hard	(Finland) Patrik Niklas-Salminen	(Philippines) Ruben Gonzales (Brazil) Fernando Romboli	6–3, 6–4
Loss	15–12	Mar 2023	Saint-Brieuc, France	Challenger	Hard (i)	(Finland) Patrik Niklas-Salminen	(France) Dan Added (France) Albano Olivetti	6–4, 6–7^{(7–9)}, [6–10]
Loss	15–13	Apr 2023	Madrid, Spain	Challenger	Clay	(Finland) Patrik Niklas-Salminen	Ivan Liutarevich (Ukraine) Vladyslav Manafov	4–6, 4–6
Win	16–13	Nov 2023	Danderyd, Sweden	Challenger	Hard (i)	(United Kingdom) Julian Cash	(India) Jeevan Nedunchezhiyan (India) Vijay Sundar Prashanth	6–7^{(7–9)}, 6–4, [10–7]
Win	17–13	Apr 2024	Split, Croatia	Challenger	Clay	(France) Jonathan Eysseric	(Sweden) Filip Bergevi (Netherlands) Mick Veldheer	0–6, 6–4, [10–8]
Win	18–13	Aug 2024	Lüdenscheid, Germany	Challenger	Clay	(Netherlands) David Pel	(Netherlands) Matwé Middelkoop (Ukraine) Denys Molchanov	6–4, 2–6, [10–8]
Loss	18–14	Nov 2024	Seoul, South Korea	Challenger	Hard	(United States) Vasil Kirkov	(India) Saketh Myneni (India) Ramkumar Ramanathan	4–6, 6–4, [3–10]
Win	19–14	Nov 2024	Kobe, Japan	Challenger	Hard (i)	(United States) Vasil Kirkov	(Japan) Kaichi Uchida (Japan) Takeru Yuzuki	7–6^{(9–7)}, 7–5
Loss	19–15	Apr 2025	Gwangju, South Korea	Challenger	Hard	(United States) Vasil Kirkov	(Chinese Taipei) Ray Ho (Australia) Matthew Romios	3–6, 6–7^{(6–8)}
Loss	19–16	May 2025	Guangzhou, China	Challenger	Hard	(United States) Vasil Kirkov	(Chinese Taipei) Ray Ho (Australia) Matthew Romios	3–6, 4–6
Win	20–16	May 2025	Wuxi, China	Challenger	Hard	(United States) Vasil Kirkov	(Chinese Taipei) Ray Ho (Australia) Matthew Romios	3–6, 7–5, [10–6]
Win	21–16	Jun 2025	Bad Rappenau, Germany	Challenger	Clay	(United States) Vasil Kirkov	(Germany) Jakob Schnaitter (Germany) Mark Wallner	7–6^{(7–5)}, 4–6, [10–7]
Win	22–16	Jul 2025	Braunschweig, Germany	Challenger	Clay	(United States) Vasil Kirkov	(Peru) Alexander Merino (Germany) Christoph Negritu	6–2, 6–3
Loss	22–17	Aug 2025	Hagen, Germany	Challenger	Clay	(United States) Vasil Kirkov	(Germany) Hendrik Jebens (France) Albano Olivetti	4–6, 7–6 ^{(7–2)}, [8–10]
Win	23–17	Oct 2025	Roanne, France	Challenger	Hard (i)	(United States) Vasil Kirkov	(Belgium) Joran Vliegen (United States) Jackson Withrow	4–6, 6–1, [10–4]
Loss	23–18	Jan 2026	Manama, Bahrain	Challenger	Hard	(United States) Vasil Kirkov	(India) Sriram Balaji (Austria) Neil Oberleitner	6–7^{(1–7)}, 4–6
Loss	23–19	April 2026	Aix Provence, France	Challenger	Clay	(United States) Vasil Kirkov	(United States) Robert Cash (United States) JJ Tracy	7–5, 4–6 [4–10]
Loss	23–20	August 2026	Brownsburg, USA	Challenger	Hard	(United States) Robert Cash	(Ecuador) Gonzalo Escobar (India) Niki Kaliyanda Poonacha	4–6, 1–6
Win	24–20	September 2026	Rennes, France	Challenger	Hard (i)	(Netherlands) Sander Arends	Ivan Liutarevich (United Kingdom) Joshua Paris	6-1, 6–1

== Doubles performance timeline ==
Key
W	F	SF	QF	#R	RR	Q#	DNQ	A	NH

(W) winner; (F) finalist; (SF) semifinalist; (QF) quarterfinalist; (#R) rounds 4, 3, 2, 1; (RR) round-robin stage; (Q#) qualification round; (DNQ) did not qualify; (A) absent; (NH) not held; (SR) strike rate (events won / competed); (W–L) win–loss record.
To avoid confusion and double counting, these charts are updated at the conclusion of a tournament or when the player's participation has ended.

Career statistics current 10 November 2025.

Tournament	2016	2017	2018	2019	2020	2021	2022	2023	2024	2025	2026	2027	SR	W–L
Grand Slam tournaments
Australian Open	A	A	A	A	A	A	A	A	1R	A	2R	?	0 / 2	1–2
French Open	A	A	A	A	A	A	A	1R	A	1R	2R	?	0 / 3	1–3
Wimbledon	A	A	A	A	NH	A	A	QF	1R	1R	1R	?	0 / 4	3–4
US Open	A	A	A	A	A	A	A	2R	A	2R	1R	?	0 / 3	2–3
Win–loss	0–0	0–0	0–0	0–0	0–0	0–0	0–0	4–3	0–2	1–3	2-4	?	0 / 12	7–12
Career statistics ATP
Tournaments	0	0	0	0	0	0	2	12	11	11	15	?	50	
Titles	0	0	0	0	0	0	0	0	0	0	0	?	0	
Finals	0	0	0	0	0	0	0	0	0	3	2	?	5	
Overall win–loss	0–0	0–0	0–0	0–0	0–0	0–0	1–2	7–12	4–11	14-11	22-19	?	48–55	
Win %	–	–	–	–	–	–	33%	37%	27%	56%	54%	?	47%	
Year-end ranking	1231	928	531	438	410	209	133	73	112	61	52	?		
