= 2026 Bahrain Ministry of Interior Tennis Challenger =

- Date: 27 January – 1 February
- Edition: 5th
- Surface: Hard
- Location: Manama, Bahrain

Champions

Singles
- (France) Kyrian Jacquet

Doubles
- (India) Sriram Balaji / (Austria) Neil Oberleitner
- Bahrain Ministry of Interior Tennis Challenger

The 2026 Bahrain Ministry of Interior Tennis Challenger was a professional tennis tournament played on hardcourts. It was the fifth edition of the tournament which was part of the 2026 ATP Challenger Tour. It took place in Manama, Bahrain between 27 January and 1 February 2026.

== Singles main-draw entrants ==
=== Seeds ===
Country	Player	Rank^{1}	Seed
AUS	Alexei Popyrin	50	1
ITA	Mattia Bellucci	76	2
GBR	Jacob Fearnley	77	3
AUT	Filip Misolic	84	4
GER	Yannick Hanfmann	102	5
ARG	Thiago Agustín Tirante	103	6
ITA	Luca Nardi	108	7
JPN	Shintaro Mochizuki	112	8

- ^{1} Rankings are as of 19 January 2026.

=== Other entrants ===
The following players received wildcards into the singles main draw:

- (Italy) Mattia Bellucci
- (Australia) Alexei Popyrin
- (China) Zhang Zhizhen

The following player received entry into the singles main draw through the Next Gen Accelerator programme:

- (Czech Republic) Maxim Mrva

The following players received entry from the qualifying draw:

- (Lithuania) Edas Butvilas
- (India) Manas Dhamne
- (Turkey) Yankı Erel
- (Bulgaria) Dimitar Kuzmanov
- (Slovakia) Lukáš Pokorný
- (Ukraine) Vadym Ursu

The following player received entry as a lucky loser:

- (Kazakhstan) Beibit Zhukayev

== Champions ==
=== Singles ===
- (France) Kyrian Jacquet def. (Italy) Luca Nardi 7–5, 3–6, 6–4.

=== Doubles ===
- (India) Sriram Balaji / (Austria) Neil Oberleitner def. (United States) Vasil Kirkov / (Netherlands) Bart Stevens 7–6^{(7–1)}, 6–4.
