= Patrik Niklas-Salminen =

Finnish tennis player

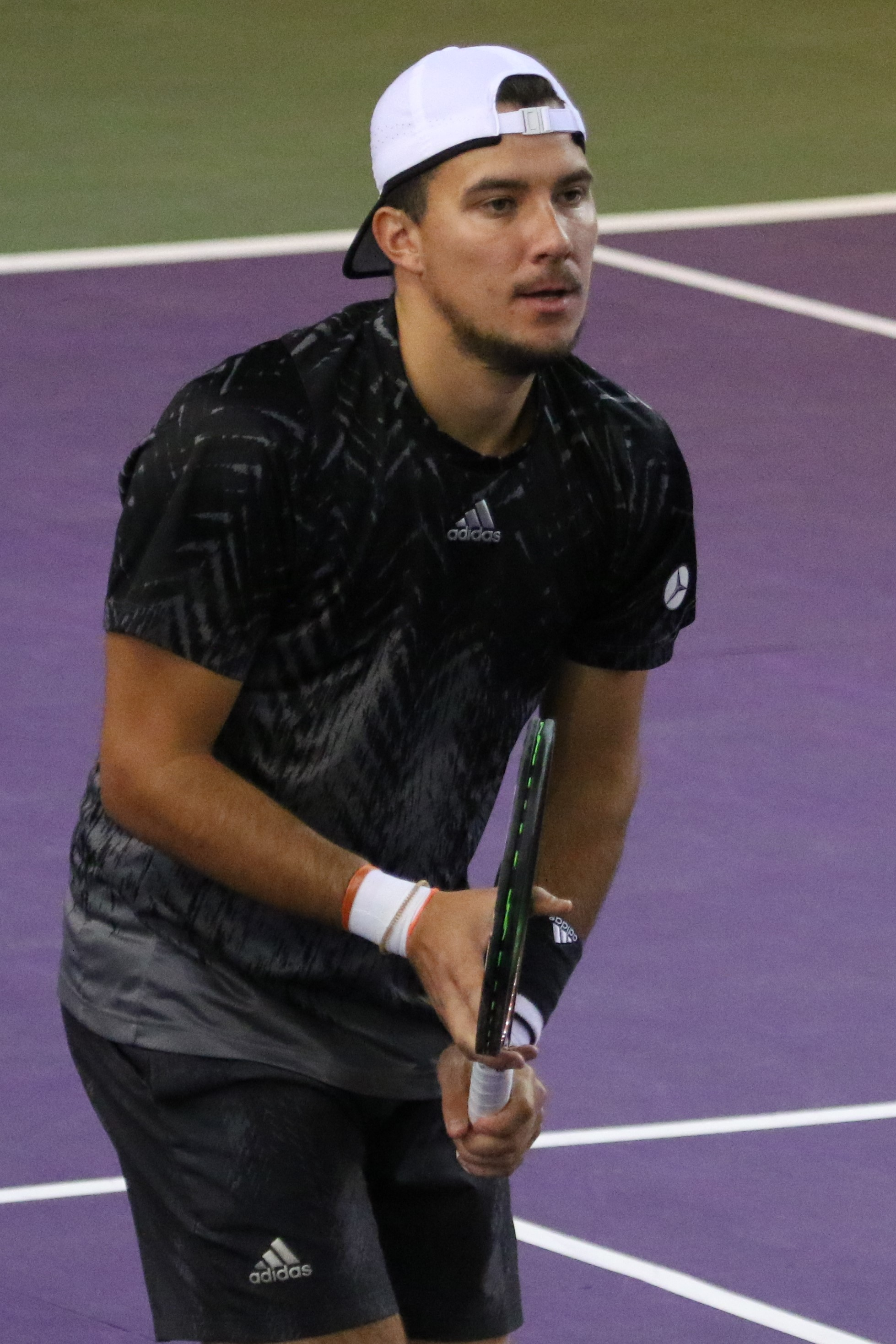
- Niklas-Salminen at the 2022 Internationaux de Tennis de Vendée
- Country (sports): Finland
- Residence: Tampere, Finland
- Born: 5 March 1997 (age 29) Tampere, Finland
- Height: 1.88 m (6 ft 2 in)
- Plays: Left-handed (two handed-backhand)
- Prize money: $204,830

Singles
- Career record: 2–4 (at ATP Tour level, Grand Slam level, and in Davis Cup)
- Career titles: 0
- Highest ranking: No. 418 (2 March 2020)

Doubles
- Career record: 5–9 (at ATP Tour level, Grand Slam level, and in Davis Cup)
- Career titles: 8 Challengers
- Highest ranking: No. 95 (17 April 2023)
- Current ranking: No. 131 (8 June 2026)

Team competitions
- Davis Cup: 2–3
- Last updated on: 8 June 2026.

Patrik Niklas-Salminen (born 5 March 1997) is a Finnish professional tennis player who specializes in doubles. He has a career high ATP doubles ranking of world No. 95 achieved on 17 April 2023 and a singles ranking of No. 418 achieved on 3 March 2020. Niklas-Salminen has won nine doubles ATP Challenger Tour titles.

== Career ==
On the junior tour, Niklas-Salminen had a career high ITF junior ranking of No. 20 achieved in September 2015. Niklas-Salminen reached the semifinals of the 2015 Wimbledon boys' singles event, losing to Mikael Ymer in the semifinal.

Niklas-Salminen has represented Finland in Davis Cup, where he has a win–loss record of 2–3.

== ATP career finals ==
=== Doubles: 1 (1 runner-up) ===
Legend Grand Slam (0–0) ATP Masters 1000 (0–0) ATP 500 Series (0–0) ATP 250 Series (0–1)	Titles by surface Hard (0–1) Clay (0–0) Grass (0–0)	Titles by setting Outdoor (0–0) Indoor (0–1)

Result	W–L	Date	Tournament	Tier	Surface	Partner	Opponents	Score
Loss	0–1	Feb 2024	Open 13, France	250 series	Hard (i)	(Finland) Emil Ruusuvuori	(Czech Republic) Tomáš Macháč (China) Zhang Zhizhen	3–6, 4–6

== ATP Challenger and ITF Futures finals ==
=== Doubles: 40 (25 titles, 15 runners-up) ===
Legend
ATP Challenger (10–15)
ITF Futures (15–0)

==== ATP Challenger Finals (10–16) ====
Finals by surface
Hard (8–10)
Clay (1–6)
Grass (0–0)
Carpet (1–0)

Result	W–L	Date	Tournament	Tier	Surface	Partner	Opponents	Score
Win	1–0	Nov 2019	Playford, Australia	Challenger	Hard	(Finland) Harri Heliövaara	(Philippines) Ruben Gonzales (United States) Evan King	6–4, 6–7^{(4–7)}, [10–7]
Win	2–0	Mar 2022	Lille, France	Challenger	Hard	(Norway) Viktor Durasovic	(France) Jonathan Eysseric (France) Quentin Halys	7–5, 7–6^{(7–1)}
Loss	2–1	Jul 2022	Tampere, Finland	Challenger	Clay	(Poland) Karol Drzewiecki	(Austria) Alexander Erler (Austria) Lucas Miedler	6–7^{(3–7)}, 1–6
Loss	2–2	Jul 2022	Zug, Switzerland	Challenger	Clay	(Poland) Karol Drzewiecki	(Czech Republic) Zdeněk Kolář (Czech Republic) Adam Pavlásek	3–6, 5–7
Win	3–2	Oct 2022	Ismaning, Germany	Challenger	Carpet	(Belgium) Michael Geerts	(Germany) Fabian Fallert (Germany) Hendrik Jebens	7–6^{(7–5)}, 7–6^{(10–8)}
Loss	3–3	Jan 2023	Oeiras, Portugal	Challenger	Hard (i)	(Netherlands) Bart Stevens	(Netherlands) Sander Arends (Netherlands) David Pel	3–6, 6–7 ^{(3–7)}
Loss	3–4	Jan 2023	Tenerife, Spain	Challenger	Hard	(Netherlands) Bart Stevens	(Romania) Victor Vlad Cornea (Spain) Sergio Martos Gornés	3–6, 4–6
Win	4–4	Feb 2023	Manama, Bahrain	Challenger	Hard	(Netherlands) Bart Stevens	(Philippines) Ruben Gonzales (Brazil) Fernando Romboli	6–3, 6–4
Loss	4–5	Mar 2023	Saint-Brieuc, France	Challenger	Hard (i)	(Netherlands) Bart Stevens	(France) Dan Added (France) Albano Olivetti	6–4, 6–7 ^{(7–9)} [6–10]
Loss	4–6	Apr 2023	Madrid, Spain	Challenger	Clay	(Netherlands) Bart Stevens	Ivan Liutarevich (Ukraine) Vladyslav Manafov	4–6, 4–6
Loss	4–7	Feb 2024	Manama, Bahrain	Challenger	Hard	(United States) Vasil Kirkov	(Greece) Petros Tsitsipas (Spain) Sergio Martos Gornes	6–3, 3–6, [8–10]
Loss	4–8	Mar 2024	Hamburg, Germany	Challenger	Hard	(Poland) Karol Drzewiecki	(Switzerland) Rémy Bertola (Italy) Mattia Bellucci	4–6, 5–7
Loss	4–9	May 2024	Guangzhou, China	Challenger	Hard	(South Korea) Nam Ji-sung	(Australia) Blake Ellis (Australia) Tristan Schoolkate	2–6, 7–6^{(7–4)}, [4–10]
Win	5–9	May 2024	Vicenza, Italy	Challenger	Clay	(Ukraine) Vladyslav Manafov	(Germany) Andre Begemann (India) Niki Kaliyanda Poonacha	6–3, 6–4
Loss	5–10	Jul 2024	Modena, Italy	Challenger	Clay	(Germany) Andre Begemann	(France) Jonathan Eysseric (United States) George Goldhoff	3–6, 6–3, [8–10]
Loss	5–11	Aug 2025	Sofia, Bulgaria	Challenger	Clay	(Slovakia) Miloš Karol	(Serbia) Stefan Latinović; Marat Sharipov	3–6, 6–2, [11–13]
Loss	5–12	Aug 2025	Hersonissos, Greece	Challenger	Hard	(Romania) Victor Vlad Cornea	(Germany) Mats Rosenkranz (United Kingdom) Harry Wendelken	6–4, 4–6, [7–10]
Win	6–12	Sep 2025	Rennes, France	Challenger	Hard (i)	(Czech Republic) Matěj Vocel	(Germany) Hendrik Jebens (France) Albano Olivetti	6–3, 6–3
Loss	6–13	Sep 2025	Saint-Tropez, France	Challenger	Hard	(Czech Republic) Matěj Vocel	(United States) Trey Hilderbrand (United States) Mac Kiger	6–7 ^{(5–7)}, 5–7
Loss	6–14	Oct 2025	Hamburg, Germany	Challenger	Hard (i)	(Slovakia) Miloš Karol	(Belgium) Michael Geerts (Germany) Tim Rühl	6–7 ^{(6–8)}, 5–7
Win	7–14	Feb 2026	Pune, India	Challenger	Hard	(South Korea) Nam Ji-sung	(Thailand) Pruchya Isaro (India) Niki Kaliyanda Poonacha	6–4, 6–7 ^{(1–7)}, [10–7]
Win	8–14	Mar 2026	Miyazaki, Japan	Challenger	Hard	(South Korea) Nam Ji-sung	(Japan) Yuta Shimizu (Japan) James Trotter	7–5, 6–3
Win	9–14	Apr 2026	Jiujiang, China	Challenger	Hard	(South Korea) Nam Ji-sung	(Chinese Taipei) Hsu Yu-hsiou (Japan) Seita Watanabe	6–4, 6–4
Loss	9–15	May 2026	Wuxi, China	Challenger	Hard	(South Korea) Nam Ji-sung	(Netherlands) Jean-Julien Rojer (United States) Theodore Winegar	3–6, 6–7^{(6–8)}
Win	10–15	Jun 2026	Cary, United States	Challenger	Hard	(South Korea) Nam Ji-sung	(New Zealand) Finn Reynolds (New Zealand) James Watt	5–7, 7–5, [10–8]
Loss	10–16	Sep 2026	Genoa, Italy	Challenger	Clay	(Czech Republic) Michael Vrbenský	(Spain) Íñigo Cervantes (Ukraine) Denys Molchanov	2–6, 7–6^{(8–6)}, [7–10]
