= Yusuf Qaed =

Bahraini tennis player

- Country (sports): Bahrain
- Born: 15 July 1994 (age 30); Manama, Bahrain
- Plays: Right-handed (two-handed backhand)
- Prize money: $1,786

Singles
- Career record: 6–20 (at ATP Tour level, Grand Slam level, and in Davis Cup)
- Career titles: 0
- Highest ranking: No. 1644 (3 April 2017)

Doubles
- Career record: 5–13 (at ATP Tour level, Grand Slam level, and in Davis Cup)
- Career titles: 0
- Last updated on: 15 November 2021.

Yusuf Ebrahim Ahmed Qaed (born 15 July 1994) is a Bahraini tennis player. With a world ranking of #1644 in 2017, Qaed became and still remains the highest ranked tennis player in Bahraini history.

Qaed has a career high ATP singles ranking of 1644 achieved on 3 April 2017.

Qaed represents Bahrain at the Davis Cup, where he has a W/L record of 11–33.
