= Bahrain Ministry of Interior Tennis Challenger =

- 2025 Bahrain Ministry of Interior Tennis Challenger

ATP Challenger Tour
- Location: Manama, Bahrain
- Venue: Public Security Officers Club, Gudaibiya
- Category: ATP Challenger Tour 125
- Surface: Hard / Outdoors
- Draw: 32S/16Q/16D
- Prize money: $164,000
- Website: Website

The Bahrain Ministry of Interior Tennis Challenger is a professional tennis tournament played on outdoor hardcourts and it's held in Manama, Bahrain, where it is organized by the Public Security Sports Association. The first edition of the tournament was played in 2021. It is listed as a Challenger 125 since 2023.

== Past finals ==
=== Singles ===
Year	Champion	Runner-up	Score
2026	(France) Kyrian Jacquet	(Italy) Luca Nardi	7–5, 3–6, 6–4
2025	(Hungary) Márton Fucsovics	(Italy) Andrea Vavassori	6–3, 6–7^{(3–7)}, 6–4
2024	(Kazakhstan) Mikhail Kukushkin	(France) Richard Gasquet	7–6^{(7–5)}, 6–4
2023	(Australia) Thanasi Kokkinakis	(Jordan) Abedallah Shelbayh	6–1, 6–4
2022	Not held		
2021	(India) Ramkumar Ramanathan	(Russia) Evgeny Karlovskiy	6–1, 6–4

=== Doubles ===
Year	Champion	Runner-up	Score
2026	(India) Sriram Balaji (Austria) Neil Oberleitner	(United States) Vasil Kirkov (Netherlands) Bart Stevens	7–6^{(7–1)}, 6–4
2025	(Ukraine) Vitaliy Sachko (Kazakhstan) Beibit Zhukayev	Ivan Liutarevich (France) Luca Sanchez	6–4, 6–0
2024	(Spain) Sergio Martos Gornés (Greece) Petros Tsitsipas	(United States) Vasil Kirkov (Finland) Patrik Niklas-Salminen	3–6, 6–3, [10–8]
2023	(Finland) Patrik Niklas-Salminen (Netherlands) Bart Stevens	(Philippines) Ruben Gonzales (Brazil) Fernando Romboli	6–3, 6–4
2022	Not held		
2021	(Portugal) Nuno Borges (Portugal) Francisco Cabral	(Austria) Maximilian Neuchrist (Greece) Michail Pervolarakis	7–5, 6–7^{(5–7)}, [10–8]
