= 2022 Garden Open – Singles =

Singles
- 2022 Garden Open

Final
- Champion: (Italy) Franco Agamenone
- Runner-up: (Italy) Gian Marco Moroni
- Score: 6–1, 6–4

Events
Singles	Doubles
← 2021 ·	Garden Open	· 2023 →

Juan Manuel Cerúndolo was the defending champion but chose not to defend his title.

Franco Agamenone won the title after defeating Gian Marco Moroni 6–1, 6–4 in the final.

== Seeds ==
1. (France) Quentin Halys (semifinals)
2. (United Kingdom) Jack Draper (second round)
3. (Italy) Flavio Cobolli (semifinals)
4. (Australia) Christopher O'Connell (withdrew)
5. (Serbia) Nikola Milojević (first round)
6. (France) Manuel Guinard (first round)
7. (France) Hugo Grenier (second round)
8. (France) Gilles Simon (first round)

== Draw ==
=== Key ===
- Q = Qualifier
- WC = Wild card
- LL = Lucky loser
- Alt = Alternate
- SE = Special exempt
- PR = Protected ranking
- ITF = ITF entry
- JE = Junior exempt
- w/o = Walkover
- r = Retired
- d = Defaulted
- SR = Special ranking

=== Finals ===
Semifinals
1	(France) Quentin Halys	6^{4}	3
(Italy) Gian Marco Moroni	7^{7}	6
3	(Italy) Flavio Cobolli	3	4
(Italy) Franco Agamenone	6	6

Final
(Italy) Gian Marco Moroni	1	4
(Italy) Franco Agamenone	6	6

=== Top half ===
First round
1	(France) Q Halys	7^{12}	6
(France) E Couacaud	6^{10}	4
Q	(Belgium) M Geerts	4	7^{7}	6
(Italy) A Pellegrino	6	6^{5}	2
Alt	A Kuznetsov	2	1
(Netherlands) J de Jong	6	6
WC	(Italy) M Arnaldi	2	6	6
5	(Serbia) N Milojević	6	4	0
LL	(Switzerland) L Riedi	3	7	6
(Croatia) N Serdarušić	6	5	3
Q	(Turkey) E Kırkın	6	7^{7}
(Germany) C-M Stebe	4	6^{3}
(Italy) A Giannessi	6^{5}	2^{r}
Q	(Kazakhstan) D Yevseyev	7^{7}	3
(Italy) GM Moroni	6	6
8	(France) G Simon	1	4

Second round
1	(France) Q Halys	7^{7}	6
Q	(Belgium) M Geerts	6^{1}	3
(Netherlands) J de Jong	6	3	6
WC	(Italy) M Arnaldi	1	6	3
LL	(Switzerland) L Riedi	6	3	4
Q	(Turkey) E Kırkın	2	6	6
Q	(Kazakhstan) D Yevseyev	0	1
(Italy) GM Moroni	6	6

Quarterfinals
1	(France) Q Halys	4	6	7^{8}
(Netherlands) J de Jong	6	4	6^{6}
Q	(Turkey) E Kırkın	4	3
(Italy) GM Moroni	6	6

Semifinals
1	(France) Q Halys	6^{4}	3
(Italy) GM Moroni	7^{7}	6

=== Bottom half ===
First round
7	(France) H Grenier	6	4	6
Alt	(France) A Hoang	3	6	4
(Turkey) A Çelikbilek	3	7	4
Q	(France) K de Schepper	6	5	6
(Italy) T Fabbiano	7	3	7
(Italy) S Caruso	5	6	5
(Croatia) B Ćorić	6	3	4
3	(Italy) F Cobolli	4	6	6
6	(France) M Guinard	3	2
(Italy) F Agamenone	6	6
Q	(France) L Van Assche	3	4
Q	(France) J Eysseric	6	6
WC	(Italy) G Zeppieri	6	6
WC	(Italy) S Napolitano	2	2
(Kazakhstan) T Skatov	2	1
2	(United Kingdom) J Draper	6	6

Second round
7	(France) H Grenier	3	3
Q	(France) K de Schepper	6	6
(Italy) T Fabbiano	4	7^{7}	2
3	(Italy) F Cobolli	6	6^{4}	6
(Italy) F Agamenone	6	2	7
Q	(France) J Eysseric	4	6	5
WC	(Italy) G Zeppieri	6	6
2	(United Kingdom) J Draper	1	4

Quarterfinals
Q	(France) K de Schepper	6	6^{5}	3
3	(Italy) F Cobolli	3	7^{7}	6
(Italy) F Agamenone	7	6
WC	(Italy) G Zeppieri	5	4

Semifinals
3	(Italy) F Cobolli	3	4
(Italy) F Agamenone	6	6
