= 2018 Garden Open – Singles =

Singles
- 2018 Garden Open

Final
- Champion: (Czech Republic) Adam Pavlásek
- Runner-up: (Serbia) Laslo Đere
- Score: 7–6^{(7–1)}, 6–7^{(9–11)}, 6–4

Events
| Singles | Doubles |
| ← 2017 · | Garden Open | · 2019 → |

Marco Cecchinato was the defending champion but chose not to defend his title.

Adam Pavlásek won the title after defeating Laslo Đere 7–6^{(7–1)}, 6–7^{(9–11)}, 6–4 in the final.

== Seeds ==
1. (Belgium) Ruben Bemelmans (second round)
2. (Serbia) Laslo Đere (final)
3. (Japan) Taro Daniel (withdrew)
4. (Germany) Yannick Maden (withdrew)
5. (Brazil) Rogério Dutra Silva (quarterfinals)
6. (France) Quentin Halys (first round)
7. (Slovakia) Jozef Kovalík (second round)
8. (Italy) Simone Bolelli (quarterfinals, withdrew)

== Draw ==
=== Key ===
- Q = Qualifier
- WC = Wild card
- LL = Lucky loser
- Alt = Alternate
- SE = Special exempt
- PR = Protected ranking
- ITF = ITF entry
- JE = Junior exempt
- w/o = Walkover
- r = Retired
- d = Defaulted
- SR = Special ranking

=== Finals ===
Semifinals
WC | (Italy) Gianluigi Quinzi | 7^{7} | 3 | 5
(Czech Republic) Adam Pavlásek | 6^{4} | 6 | 7
Q | (Germany) Kevin Krawietz | 2 | 2
2 | (Serbia) Laslo Đere | 6 | 6

Final
(Czech Republic) Adam Pavlásek | 7^{7} | 6^{9} | 6
2 | (Serbia) Laslo Đere | 6^{1} | 7^{11} | 4

=== Top half ===
First round
1 | (Belgium) R Bemelmans | 6 | 6
(Italy) A Arnaboldi | 4 | 2
WC | (Italy) G Quinzi | 6 | 6
LL | (Italy) R Marcora | 4 | 4
(Argentina) JI Londero | 7^{7} | 6
Q | (Spain) B Zapata Miralles | 6^{0} | 3
(France) V Millot | 3 | 1
5/Alt | (Brazil) R Dutra Silva | 6 | 6
LL | (Argentina) Patricio Heras | 6 | 3 | 7
WC | (Italy) G Fonio | 4 | 6 | 5
WC | (Italy) Riccardo Balzerani | 3 | 7^{7} | 4
(Croatia) V Galović | 6 | 6^{4} | 6
SE | (Italy) M Viola | 2 | 4
(Italy) A Giannessi | 6 | 6
(Czech Republic) A Pavlásek | 6 | 4 | 6
6 | (France) Q Halys | 4 | 6 | 1

Second round
1 | (Belgium) R Bemelmans | 6 | 1 | 2
WC | (Italy) G Quinzi | 4 | 6 | 6
(Argentina) JI Londero | 6^{5} | 4
5/Alt | (Brazil) R Dutra Silva | 7^{7} | 6
LL | (Argentina) P Heras | 7^{9} | 6
(Croatia) V Galović | 6^{7} | 0
(Italy) A Giannessi | 4 | 1
(Czech Republic) A Pavlásek | 6 | 6

Quarterfinals
WC | (Italy) G Quinzi | 6 | 6
5/Alt | (Brazil) R Dutra Silva | 4 | 4
LL | (Argentina) P Heras | 6^{5} | 1
(Czech Republic) A Pavlásek | 7^{7} | 6

Semifinals
WC | (Italy) G Quinzi | 7^{7} | 3 | 5
(Czech Republic) A Pavlásek | 6^{4} | 6 | 7

=== Bottom half ===
First round
7 | (Slovakia) J Kovalík | 7 | 6
(Slovakia) A Martin | 5 | 4
(Czech Republic) V Šafránek | 1 | 6 | 6
(Italy) M Donati | 6 | 2 | 3
Q | (Germany) K Krawietz | 6 | 6
Q | (Austria) A Haider-Maurer | 1 | 3
(Argentina) R Olivo | 6 | 6
Q | (Spain) Í Cervantes | 2 | 2
8 | (Italy) S Bolelli | 6 | 7^{7}
(Argentina) M Trungelliti | 2 | 6^{1}
LL | (Spain) Alberto Romero de Ávila Senise | 6^{7} | 0
(Egypt) M Safwat | 7^{9} | 6
(Bosnia and Herzegovina) T Brkić | 6 | 4 | 6
(Czech Republic) Z Kolář | 1 | 6 | 0
WC | (Italy) R Brancaccio | 4 | 2
2 | (Serbia) L Đere | 6 | 6

Second round
7 | (Slovakia) J Kovalík | 6^{3} | 7 | 3
(Czech Republic) V Šafránek | 7^{7} | 5 | 6
Q | (Germany) K Krawietz | 3 | 7^{7} | 6
(Argentina) R Olivo | 6 | 6^{2} | 3
8 | (Italy) S Bolelli | 6 | 6
(Egypt) M Safwat | 1 | 4
(Bosnia and Herzegovina) T Brkić | 6^{5} | 6 | 5
2 | (Serbia) L Đere | 7^{7} | 3 | 7

Quarterfinals
(Czech Republic) V Šafránek | 6^{5} | 6^{3}
Q | (Germany) K Krawietz | 7^{7} | 7^{7}
8 | (Italy) S Bolelli
2 | (Serbia) L Đere | w/o

Semifinals
Q | (Germany) K Krawietz | 2 | 2
2 | (Serbia) L Đere | 6 | 6
