= 2010 Roma Open – Singles =

Singles
- 2010 Roma Open

Final
- Champion: (Argentina) Federico del Bonis
- Runner-up: (Germany) Florian Mayer
- Score: 6–4, 6–3

Events
Singles	Doubles
← 2009 ·	Roma Open	· 2011 →

Daniel Köllerer was the defender of championship title, however lost to Federico del Bonis in the quarterfinals.
del Bonis won in the final 6–4, 6–3, against Florian Mayer.

== Seeds ==
1. (Germany) Florian Mayer (final)
2. (Germany) Daniel Brands (quarterfinals)
3. (Austria) Daniel Köllerer (quarterfinals)
4. (Italy) Paolo Lorenzi (withdrew)
5. (Portugal) Rui Machado (semifinals)
6. (Portugal) Frederico Gil (second round)
7. (Spain) Rubén Ramírez Hidalgo (semifinals)
8. (Jamaica) Dustin Brown (withdrew due to fatigue)

== Draw ==
=== Key ===
- Q = Qualifier
- WC = Wild card
- LL = Lucky loser
- Alt = Alternate
- SE = Special exempt
- PR = Protected ranking
- ITF = ITF entry
- JE = Junior exempt
- w/o = Walkover
- r = Retired
- d = Defaulted
- SR = Special ranking

=== Finals ===
Semifinals
1/WC	(Germany) Florian Mayer	6	7
7	(Spain) Rubén Ramírez Hidalgo	4	6^{0}
(Argentina) Federico del Bonis	6	7
5	(Portugal) Rui Machado	3	5

Final
1/WC	(Germany) Florian Mayer	4	3
(Argentina) Federico del Bonis	6	6

=== Top half ===
First round
1/WC	(Germany) F Mayer	7	6
(Czech Republic) I Minář	6^{0}	3
Q	(Italy) A Arnaboldi	3	6	6
LL	(Italy) G Naso	6	3	4
SE	(Netherlands) J Huta Galung	2	4
(France) D Guez	6	6
(Romania) A Ungur	7	6
LL	(Algeria) L Ouahab	6^{7}	4
LL	(Ukraine) A Smirnov	4	1
(Italy) F Volandri	6	6
(Czech Republic) J Hernych	4	6^{3}
(Slovakia) M Kližan	6	7
Q	(Austria) R Eitzinger	4	3
(France) V Millot	6	6
(Kazakhstan) Y Schukin	2	3
7	(Spain) R Ramírez Hidalgo	6	6

Second round
1/WC	(Germany) F Mayer	6	6
(Italy) A Arnaboldi	2	3
(France) D Guez	6	4	6^{3}
(Romania) A Ungur	1	6	7
(Italy) F Volandri	6	3	6
(Slovakia) M Kližan	4	6	1
(France) V Millot	2	0
7	(Spain) R Ramírez Hidalgo	6	6

Quarterfinals
1/WC	(Germany) F Mayer	4	6	6
(Romania) A Ungur	6	4	2
(Italy) F Volandri	4	4
7	(Spain) R Ramírez Hidalgo	6	6

Semifinals
1/WC	(Germany) F Mayer	6	7
7	(Spain) R Ramírez Hidalgo	4	6^{0}

=== Bottom half ===
First round
6	(Portugal) F Gil	6	6
Q	(Italy) A di Mauro	1	4
(Argentina) F del Bonis	7	6
(Argentina) JP Brzezicki	6^{5}	2
(Croatia) I Dodig	2	3
(Croatia) A Veić	6	6
(Czech Republic) L Rosol	0	3
3	(Austria) D Köllerer	6	6
5	(Portugal) R Machado	6	7
WC	(Italy) M Trevisan	3	6^{1}
(Germany) J Reister	4	4
WC	(Croatia) M Ančić	6	6
Q	(Italy) D Bracciali	6	6
LL	(Italy) F Aldi	3	4
(Czech Republic) J Vaněk	3	1
2	(Germany) D Brands	6	6

Second round
6	(Portugal) F Gil	6	1	4
(Argentina) F del Bonis	3	6	6
(Croatia) A Veić	1	2
3	(Austria) D Köllerer	6	6
5	(Portugal) R Machado	4	6	7
WC	(Croatia) M Ančić	6	4	5
Q	(Italy) D Bracciali	6	6^{4}	2
2	(Germany) D Brands	4	7	6

Quarterfinals
(Argentina) F del Bonis	6	6
3	(Austria) D Köllerer	2	3
5	(Portugal) R Machado	6	6
2	(Germany) D Brands	1	3

Semifinals
(Argentina) F del Bonis	6	7
5	(Portugal) R Machado	3	5
