= 2016 Garden Open – Singles =

Singles
- 2016 Garden Open

Final
- Champion: (United Kingdom) Kyle Edmund
- Runner-up: (Serbia) Filip Krajinović
- Score: 7–6^{(7–2)}, 6–0

Events
Singles	Doubles
← 2015 ·	Garden Open	· 2017 →

Aljaž Bedene was the defending champion but chose not to participate.

Kyle Edmund won the title, defeating Filip Krajinović 7–6^{(7–2)}, 6–0 in the final.

== Seeds ==
1. (Czech Republic) Jiří Veselý (semifinals)
2. (United Kingdom) Kyle Edmund (champion)
3. (Argentina) Horacio Zeballos (first round)
4. (Czech Republic) Adam Pavlásek (first round)
5. (Serbia) Filip Krajinović (final)
6. (Australia) Jordan Thompson (first round)
7. (France) Kenny de Schepper (second round)
8. (France) Vincent Millot (second round)

== Draw ==
=== Key ===
- Q = Qualifier
- WC = Wild card
- LL = Lucky loser
- Alt = Alternate
- SE = Special exempt
- PR = Protected ranking
- ITF = ITF entry
- JE = Junior exempt
- w/o = Walkover
- r = Retired
- d = Defaulted
- SR = Special ranking

=== Finals ===
Semifinals
1	(Czech Republic) Jiří Veselý	3	4
5	(Serbia) Filip Krajinović	6	6
(Italy) Filippo Volandri	1	4
2	(United Kingdom) Kyle Edmund	6	6

Final
5	(Serbia) Filip Krajinović	6^{2}	0
2	(United Kingdom) Kyle Edmund	7^{7}	6

=== Top half ===
First round
1	(Czech Republic) J Veselý	7	6
(Turkey) M İlhan	5	2
SE	(Italy) S Napolitano	3	7	6
WC	(Italy) Federico Bonacia	6	5	2
(Germany) T Kamke	6	6
(China) Y Bai	2	2
LL	(Japan) Y Uchiyama	4	4
8	(France) V Millot	6	6
3	(Argentina) H Zeballos	4	6	4
WC	(Italy) A Pellegrino	6	4	6
Q	(Portugal) FF Silva	6	6
Q	(Russia) I Nedelko	4	0
(Japan) H Moriya	7	3	1
Q	(India) S Nagal	5	6	6
(Romania) A Ungur	6	0	3
5	(Serbia) F Krajinović	3	6	6

Second round
1	(Czech Republic) J Veselý	6	7^{7}
SE	(Italy) S Napolitano	1	6^{3}
(Germany) T Kamke	6^{4}	6	6
8	(France) V Millot	7^{7}	1	4
WC	(Italy) A Pellegrino	6	7^{7}
Q	(Portugal) FF Silva	3	6^{1}
Q	(India) S Nagal	7	3	2
5	(Serbia) F Krajinović	5	6	6

Quarterfinals
1	(Czech Republic) J Veselý	7	6
(Germany) T Kamke	5	0
WC	(Italy) A Pellegrino	3	6	4
5	(Serbia) F Krajinović	6	2	6

Semifinals
1	(Czech Republic) J Veselý	3	4
5	(Serbia) F Krajinović	6	6

=== Bottom half ===
First round
6	(Australia) J Thompson	4	4
(Argentina) M Trungelliti	6	6
Q	(Hungary) M Fucsovics	0	7	4
(United States) T Paul	6	5	6
(China) Z Li	2	0
(Italy) F Volandri	6	6
(Romania) M Copil	4	7	6
4	(Czech Republic) A Pavlásek	6	5	4
7	(France) K de Schepper	6	7
WC	(Italy) G Naso	2	5
(Australia) L Saville	2	1
(Slovenia) B Rola	6	6
(France) A Michon	6	4	1
LL	(Germany) K Krawietz	2	6	6
(Estonia) J Zopp	4	3
2	(United Kingdom) K Edmund	6	6

Second round
(Argentina) M Trungelliti	6	6
(United States) T Paul	1	4
(Italy) F Volandri	7	6
(Romania) M Copil	5	4
7	(France) K de Schepper	1	0
(Slovenia) B Rola	6	6
LL	(Germany) K Krawietz	3	4
2	(United Kingdom) K Edmund	6	6

Quarterfinals
(Argentina) M Trungelliti	4	1
(Italy) F Volandri	6	6
(Slovenia) B Rola	4	6	0
2	(United Kingdom) K Edmund	6	3	6

Semifinals
(Italy) F Volandri	1	4
2	(United Kingdom) K Edmund	6	6
