= 2019 Garden Open – Doubles =

Doubles
- 2019 Garden Open

Final
- Champions: (Austria) Philipp Oswald (Slovakia) Filip Polášek
- Runners-up: (Serbia) Nikola Čačić (Czech Republic) Adam Pavlásek
- Score: Walkover

Events
Singles	Doubles
← 2018 ·	Garden Open	· 2021 →

Kevin Krawietz and Andreas Mies were the defending champions but chose not to defend their title.

Philipp Oswald and Filip Polášek won the title by walkover after Nikola Čačić and Adam Pavlásek withdrew before the final.

== Seeds ==
1. (Austria) Philipp Oswald / (Slovakia) Filip Polášek (champions)
2. (Mexico) Hans Hach Verdugo / (Croatia) Ante Pavić (first round)
3. (France) Jonathan Eysseric / (Croatia) Antonio Šančić (quarterfinals)
4. (Bosnia and Herzegovina) Tomislav Brkić / (Croatia) Tomislav Draganja (semifinals)

== Draw ==
Key

- Q = Qualifier
- WC = Wild card
- LL = Lucky loser
- Alt = Alternate
- ITF = ITF entry
- PR = Protected ranking
- SR = Special ranking
- SE = Special exempt
- JE = Junior exempt
- JR = Junior Accelerator Programme entrant
- CO = College Accelerator Programme entrant
- NG = Next Gen Accelerator Program entrant
- w/o = Walkover
- r = Retired
- d = Defaulted

First round
1	(Austria) P Oswald (Slovakia) F Polášek	6	6
(Italy) S Caruso (Italy) J Ocleppo	3	2
(Poland) K Drzewiecki (Poland) S Walków	6	6
(Argentina) F Agamenone (Brazil) F Romboli	3	2
4	(Bosnia and Herzegovina) T Brkić (Croatia) T Draganja	4	6	[10]
(Slovakia) J Kovalík (Serbia) D Petrović	6	1	[8]
WC	(Italy) F Cobolli (Italy) F Passaro	3	3
(United States) U Blanch (Italy) GM Moroni	6	6
(Switzerland) L Margaroli (Netherlands) M Vervoort	6	6
WC	(Italy) Andrea Giallanza (Italy) Alessandro Oneili	4	0
ITF	(Zimbabwe) B Lock (Zimbabwe) CJ Lock	1	3
3	(France) J Eysseric (Croatia) A Šančić	6	6
(Serbia) N Čačić (Czech Republic) A Pavlásek	6	4	[10]
Alt	(France) G Jacq (Tunisia) S Mansouri	4	6	[5]
ITF	(Italy) R Bonadio (Germany) Peter Heller	6	6
2	(Mexico) H Hach Verdugo (Croatia) A Pavić	1	4

Quarterfinals
1	(Austria) P Oswald (Slovakia) F Polášek	6	6
(Poland) K Drzewiecki (Poland) S Walków	4	2
4	(Bosnia and Herzegovina) T Brkić (Croatia) T Draganja	6	6
(United States) U Blanch (Italy) GM Moroni	2	2
(Switzerland) L Margaroli (Netherlands) M Vervoort	7	4	[10]
3	(France) J Eysseric (Croatia) A Šančić	5	6	[1]
(Serbia) N Čačić (Czech Republic) A Pavlásek	7^{7}	3	[11]
ITF	(Italy) R Bonadio (Germany) P Heller	6^{4}	6	[9]

Semifinals
1	(Austria) P Oswald (Slovakia) F Polášek	7^{9}	6
4	(Bosnia and Herzegovina) T Brkić (Croatia) T Draganja	6^{7}	3
(Switzerland) L Margaroli (Netherlands) M Vervoort	7^{10}	2	[3]
(Serbia) N Čačić (Czech Republic) A Pavlásek	6^{8}	6	[10]

Final
1	(Austria) P Oswald (Slovakia) F Polášek	w/o
(Serbia) N Čačić (Czech Republic) A Pavlásek
