= 2022 Garden Open =

- Date: 25 April – 1 May
- Edition: 14th
- Surface: Clay
- Location: Rome, Italy

Champions

Singles
- (Italy) Franco Agamenone

Doubles
- (Netherlands) Jesper de Jong / (Netherlands) Bart Stevens
← 2021 ·	Garden Open	· 2023 →

The 2022 Garden Open was a professional tennis tournament played on clay courts. It was the fourteenth edition of the tournament which was part of the 2022 ATP Challenger Tour. It took place in Rome, Italy between 25 April and 1 May 2022.

== Singles main-draw entrants ==
=== Seeds ===
Country	Player	Rank^{1}	Seed
FRA	Quentin Halys	102	1
GBR	Jack Draper	124	2
ITA	Flavio Cobolli	143	3
~~AUS~~	~~Christopher O'Connell~~	~~147~~	~~4~~
SRB	Nikola Milojević	149	5
FRA	Manuel Guinard	152	6
FRA	Hugo Grenier	156	7
FRA	Gilles Simon	159	8

- ^{1} Rankings as of 18 April 2022.

=== Other entrants ===
The following players received wildcards into the singles main draw:

- (Italy) Matteo Arnaldi
- (Italy) Stefano Napolitano
- (Italy) Giulio Zeppieri

The following players received entry into the singles main draw as alternates:

- (France) Antoine Hoang
- Andrey Kuznetsov

The following players received entry from the qualifying draw:

- (France) Kenny de Schepper
- (France) Jonathan Eysseric
- (Belgium) Michael Geerts
- (Turkey) Ergi Kırkın
- (France) Luca Van Assche
- (Kazakhstan) Denis Yevseyev

The following player received entry as a lucky loser:

- (Switzerland) Leandro Riedi

== Champions ==
=== Singles ===
- (Italy) Franco Agamenone def. (Italy) Gian Marco Moroni 6–1, 6–4.

=== Doubles ===
- (Netherlands) Jesper de Jong / (Netherlands) Bart Stevens def. (France) Sadio Doumbia / (France) Fabien Reboul 3–6, 7–5, [10–8].
