= 2018 Garden Open – Doubles =

Doubles
- 2018 Garden Open

Final
- Champions: (Germany) Kevin Krawietz (Germany) Andreas Mies
- Runners-up: (Belgium) Sander Gillé (Belgium) Joran Vliegen
- Score: 6–3, 2–6, [10–4]

Events
Singles	Doubles
← 2017 ·	Garden Open	· 2019 →

Andreas Mies and Oscar Otte were the defending champions but only Mies chose to defend his title, partnering Kevin Krawietz. Mies successfully defended his title.

Krawietz and Mies won the title after defeating Sander Gillé and Joran Vliegen 6–3, 2–6, [10–4] in the final.

== Seeds ==
1. (Belgium) Sander Gillé / (Belgium) Joran Vliegen (final)
2. (Ukraine) Denys Molchanov / (Slovakia) Igor Zelenay (quarterfinals)
3. (Germany) Kevin Krawietz / (Germany) Andreas Mies (champions)
4. (Croatia) Marin Draganja / (Croatia) Tomislav Draganja (quarterfinals)

== Draw ==
=== Key ===
- Q = Qualifier
- WC = Wild card
- LL = Lucky loser
- Alt = Alternate
- SE = Special exempt
- PR = Protected ranking
- ITF = ITF entry
- JE = Junior exempt
- w/o = Walkover
- r = Retired
- d = Defaulted
- SR = Special ranking

First round
1	(Belgium) S Gillé (Belgium) J Vliegen	7^{7}	6
(Italy) A Arnaboldi (Italy) M Viola	6^{2}	3
WC	(Italy) E Dalla Valle (Italy) G Fonio	4	5
(Italy) A Giannessi (Italy) A Motti	6	7
4	(Croatia) M Draganja (Croatia) T Draganja	6	2	[10]
(Czech Republic) Z Kolář (Czech Republic) A Pavlásek	3	6	[4]
WC	(Italy) D Bracciali (Italy) G Quinzi	6	6
(Italy) S Bolelli (Italy) M Donati	4	4
(Spain) Í Cervantes (Argentina) R Olivo	4	5
(Argentina) JI Londero (Brazil) F Neis	6	7
(Belgium) K Coppejans (France) Q Halys	1	4
3	(Germany) K Krawietz (Germany) A Mies	6	6
(Bosnia and Herzegovina) T Brkić (Argentina) Patricio Heras	2	4
(Slovakia) A Martin (Chile) H Podlipnik-Castillo	6	6
WC	(Italy) Riccardo Balzerani (Italy) Corrado Summaria	1	3
2	(Ukraine) D Molchanov (Slovakia) I Zelenay	6	6

Quarterfinals
1	(Belgium) S Gillé (Belgium) J Vliegen	6	6
(Italy) A Giannessi (Italy) A Motti	3	0
4	(Croatia) M Draganja (Croatia) T Draganja	5	4
WC	(Italy) D Bracciali (Italy) G Quinzi	7	6
(Argentina) JI Londero (Brazil) F Neis	4	5
3	(Germany) K Krawietz (Germany) A Mies	6	7
(Slovakia) A Martin (Chile) H Podlipnik-Castillo	6	6
2	(Ukraine) D Molchanov (Slovakia) I Zelenay	2	3

Semifinals
1	(Belgium) S Gillé (Belgium) J Vliegen	w/o
WC	(Italy) D Bracciali (Italy) G Quinzi
3	(Germany) K Krawietz (Germany) A Mies	6	6
(Slovakia) A Martin (Chile) H Podlipnik-Castillo	4	2

Final
1	(Belgium) S Gillé (Belgium) J Vliegen	3	6	[4]
3	(Germany) K Krawietz (Germany) A Mies	6	2	[10]
