= 2016 Garden Open – Doubles =

Doubles
- 2016 Garden Open

Final
- Champion: (China) Bai Yan (China) Li Zhe
- Runner-up: (Netherlands) Sander Arends (Austria) Tristan-Samuel Weissborn
- Score: 6–3, 3–6, [11–9]

Events
Singles	Doubles
← 2015 ·	Garden Open	· 2017 →

Dustin Brown and František Čermák were the defending champions but chose not to participate.

Bai Yan and Li Zhe won the title, defeating Sander Arends and Tristan-Samuel Weissborn 6–3, 3–6, [11–9] in the final.

== Seeds ==
1. (Belarus) Aliaksandr Bury / (Austria) Julian Knowle (quarterfinals)
2. (Chile) Julio Peralta / (Argentina) Horacio Zeballos (quarterfinals)
3. (Italy) Flavio Cipolla / (Australia) Rameez Junaid (first round, withdrew)
4. (Argentina) Andrés Molteni / (Mexico) Miguel Ángel Reyes-Varela (quarterfinals)

== Draw ==
=== Key ===
- Q = Qualifier
- WC = Wild card
- LL = Lucky loser
- Alt = Alternate
- SE = Special exempt
- PR = Protected ranking
- ITF = ITF entry
- JE = Junior exempt
- w/o = Walkover
- r = Retired
- d = Defaulted
- SR = Special ranking

First round
1	(Belarus) A Bury (Austria) J Knowle	6	6
WC	(Italy) Federico Bonacia (Italy) R Bonadio	3	3
(China) Y Bai (China) Z Li	6	6
WC	(Italy) Danilo Gargano (Italy) Alessio Luchetti	2	1
3	(Italy) F Cipolla (Australia) R Junaid
(France) K de Schepper (Italy) A Motti	w/o
(Croatia) D Marcan (Slovenia) B Rola	7^{7}	6
(Poland) T Bednarek (Poland) M Kowalczyk	6^{4}	4
WC	(Italy) G Naso (Italy) A Pellegrino	6^{3}	5
PR	(Germany) T Kamke (Germany) J Reister	7^{7}	7
(Australia) L Saville (Australia) J Thompson	6^{5}	4
4	(Argentina) A Molteni (Mexico) MÁ Reyes-Varela	7^{7}	6
(Netherlands) S Arends (Austria) T-S Weissborn	6	6
(Czech Republic) R Jebavý (Czech Republic) J Veselý	3	1
(United Kingdom) K Edmund (Portugal) FF Silva	4	0
2	(Chile) J Peralta (Argentina) H Zeballos	6	6

Quarterfinals
1	(Belarus) A Bury (Austria) J Knowle	3	4
(China) Y Bai (China) Z Li	6	6
(France) K de Schepper (Italy) A Motti	4	5
(Croatia) D Marcan (Slovenia) B Rola	6	7
PR	(Germany) T Kamke (Germany) J Reister	7^{9}	2	[10]
4	(Argentina) A Molteni (Mexico) MÁ Reyes-Varela	6^{7}	6	[6]
(Netherlands) S Arends (Austria) T-S Weissborn	6	6
2	(Chile) J Peralta (Argentina) H Zeballos	4	4

Semifinals
(China) Y Bai (China) Z Li	6	7
(Croatia) D Marcan (Slovenia) B Rola	3	5
PR	(Germany) T Kamke (Germany) J Reister	6	3	[9]
(Netherlands) S Arends (Austria) T-S Weissborn	3	6	[11]

Final
(China) Y Bai (China) Z Li	6	3	[11]
(Netherlands) S Arends (Austria) T-S Weissborn	3	6	[9]
