= 2015 Garden Open – Doubles =

Doubles
- 2015 Garden Open

Final
- Champions: (Germany) Dustin Brown (Czech Republic) František Čermák
- Runners-up: (Argentina) Andrés Molteni (Argentina) Marco Trungelliti
- Score: 6–1, 6–2

Events
Singles	Doubles
← 2014 ·	Garden Open	· 2016 →

Radu Albot and Artem Sitak were the defending champion, but they did not participate this year.

Dustin Brown and František Čermák won the title, defeating Andrés Molteni and Marco Trungelliti in the final, 6–1, 6–2.

== Seeds ==
1. (Germany) Dustin Brown / (Czech Republic) František Cermák (champions)
2. (Germany) Gero Kretschmer / (Germany) Alexander Satschko (quarterfinals)
3. (Netherlands) Wesley Koolhof / (Netherlands) Matwé Middelkoop (semifinals)
4. (Czech Republic) Roman Jebavý / (Ukraine) Denys Molchanov (first round)

== Draw ==
=== Key ===
- Q = Qualifier
- WC = Wild card
- LL = Lucky loser
- Alt = Alternate
- SE = Special exempt
- PR = Protected ranking
- ITF = ITF entry
- JE = Junior exempt
- w/o = Walkover
- r = Retired
- d = Defaulted
- SR = Special ranking

First round
1	(Germany) D Brown (Czech Republic) F Čermák	6	6
WC	(Italy) G Di Meo (Italy) P Starace	3	4
(Belgium) M Authom (Austria) G Melzer
(Italy) A Arnaboldi (Italy) F Cipolla	w/o
3	(Netherlands) W Koolhof (Netherlands) M Middelkoop	6	6
(Slovakia) A Martin (Chile) H Podlipnik-Castillo	3	2
(United Kingdom) A Bedene (United Kingdom) D Rice	7^{7}	6
(Czech Republic) J Mertl (Italy) A Motti	6^{4}	3
(Italy) M Cecchinato (Italy) M Viola	3	2
(Romania) P Grigoriu (Romania) C Pavăl	6	6
(Argentina) A Molteni (Argentina) M Trungelliti	7^{9}	7^{7}
4	(Czech Republic) R Jebavý (Ukraine) D Molchanov	6^{7}	6^{0}
WC	(Italy) L Sonego (Italy) S Travaglia	3	1
(Croatia) D Marcan (Croatia) A Šančić	6	6
WC	(Italy) F Baldi (Italy) M Berrettini	5	6	[8]
2	(Germany) G Kretschmer (Germany) A Satschko	7	4	[10]

Quarterfinals
1	(Germany) D Brown (Czech Republic) F Čermák	w/o
(Italy) A Arnaboldi (Italy) F Cipolla
3	(Netherlands) W Koolhof (Netherlands) M Middelkoop	5	6	[10]
(United Kingdom) A Bedene (United Kingdom) D Rice	7	3	[8]
(Romania) P Grigoriu (Romania) C Pavăl	2	6	[2]
(Argentina) A Molteni (Argentina) M Trungelliti	6	2	[10]
(Croatia) D Marcan (Croatia) A Šančić	5	6	[10]
2	(Germany) G Kretschmer (Germany) A Satschko	7	4	[6]

Semifinals
1	(Germany) D Brown (Czech Republic) F Čermák	7	1	[10]
3	(Netherlands) W Koolhof (Netherlands) M Middelkoop	5	6	[6]
(Argentina) A Molteni (Argentina) M Trungelliti	6	6
(Croatia) D Marcan (Croatia) A Šančić	2	2

Final
1	(Germany) D Brown (Czech Republic) F Čermák	6	6
(Argentina) A Molteni (Argentina) M Trungelliti	1	2
