= 2011 Roma Open – Singles =

Singles
- 2011 Roma Open

Final
- Champion: (Italy) Simone Bolelli
- Runner-up: (Argentina) Eduardo Schwank
- Score: 2–6, 6–1, 6–3

Events
| Singles | Doubles |
| ← 2010 · | Roma Open | · 2012 → |

Federico del Bonis was the defending champion, but decided not to participate this year.
Simone Bolelli won the title, defeating Eduardo Schwank 2–6, 6–1, 6–3 in the final.

== Seeds ==
1. (Germany) Tobias Kamke (quarterfinals)
2. (Germany) Julian Reister (first round)
3. (Germany) Mischa Zverev (first round, retired)
4. (Germany) Andreas Beck (withdrew with back injury)
5. (France) Benoît Paire (second round)
6. (Germany) Björn Phau (first round)
7. (Netherlands) Thomas Schoorel (second round)
8. (Luxembourg) Gilles Müller (second round)

== Draw ==
=== Key ===
- Q = Qualifier
- WC = Wild card
- LL = Lucky loser
- Alt = Alternate
- SE = Special exempt
- PR = Protected ranking
- ITF = ITF entry
- JE = Junior exempt
- w/o = Walkover
- r = Retired
- d = Defaulted
- SR = Special ranking

=== Finals ===
Semifinals
(Germany) Dustin Brown | 6 | 4 | 4
(Argentina) Eduardo Schwank | 1 | 6 | 6
WC | (Italy) Simone Vagnozzi | 2 | 6^{3}
WC | (Italy) Simone Bolelli | 6 | 7

Final
(Argentina) Eduardo Schwank | 6 | 1 | 3
WC | (Italy) Simone Bolelli | 2 | 6 | 6

=== Top half ===
First round
1 | (Germany) T Kamke | 6 | 7
(Russia) K Kravchuk | 1 | 6^{3}
(France) M Gicquel | 4 | 6 | 4
(Italy) A di Mauro | 6 | 2 | 6
(Germany) D Brown | 6 | 4 | 7
(France) A Clément | 2 | 6 | 6^{2}
WC | (Italy) M Trevisan | 4 | 4
5 | (France) B Paire | 6 | 6
3 | (Germany) M Zverev | 2^{r}
(Romania) A Ungur | 5
(Argentina) E Schwank | 6 | 6
Q | (Colombia) JS Cabal | 4 | 2
(Chile) P Capdeville | 6^{1} | 5
(Argentina) J Acasuso | 7 | 7
(Belgium) R Bemelmans | 3 | 7 | 3
7 | (Netherlands) T Schoorel | 6 | 5 | 6

Second round
1 | (Germany) T Kamke | 6 | 6
(Italy) A di Mauro | 4 | 3
(Germany) D Brown | 6 | 4 | 6
5 | (France) B Paire | 3 | 6 | 1
(Romania) A Ungur | 3 | 5
(Argentina) E Schwank | 6 | 7
(Argentina) J Acasuso | 4 | 6 | 7
7 | (Netherlands) T Schoorel | 6 | 4 | 5

Quarterfinals
1 | (Germany) T Kamke | 6 | 3 | 3
(Germany) D Brown | 1 | 6 | 6
(Argentina) E Schwank | 6 | 6
(Argentina) J Acasuso | 1 | 2

Semifinals
(Germany) D Brown | 6 | 4 | 4
(Argentina) E Schwank | 1 | 6 | 6

=== Bottom half ===
First round
6 | (Germany) B Phau | 4 | 1
(France) É Roger-Vasselin | 6 | 6
WC | (Chile) N Massú | 6 | 3 | 2
WC | (Italy) S Vagnozzi | 3 | 6 | 6
(Colombia) R Farah | 2 | 6^{6}
(Australia) P Luczak | 6 | 7
Q | (Spain) P Carreño-Busta | 6 | 6
LL | (Germany) B Knittel | 1 | 3
8 | (Luxembourg) G Müller | 4 | 7 | 6
Q | (Italy) Andrea Arnaboldi | 6 | 6^{4} | 4
(Austria) M Fischer | 7 | 6
(France) D Guez | 5 | 3
(Italy) P Lorenzi | 6 | 6
Q | (Colombia) C Salamanca | 3 | 3
WC | (Italy) S Bolelli | 7 | 6
2 | (Germany) J Reister | 6^{5} | 4

Second round
(France) É Roger-Vasselin
WC | (Italy) S Vagnozzi | w/o
(Australia) P Luczak | 1 | 6 | 1
Q | (Spain) P Carreño-Busta | 6 | 1 | 6
8 | (Luxembourg) G Müller | 4 | 6^{5}
(Austria) M Fischer | 6 | 7
(Italy) P Lorenzi | 4 | 4
WC | (Italy) S Bolelli | 6 | 6

Quarterfinals
WC | (Italy) S Vagnozzi | 6 | 6
Q | (Spain) P Carreño-Busta | 2 | 4
(Austria) M Fischer | 4 | 2
WC | (Italy) S Bolelli | 6 | 6

Semifinals
WC | (Italy) S Vagnozzi | 2 | 6^{3}
WC | (Italy) S Bolelli | 6 | 7
