= 2012 Roma Open – Singles =

Singles
- 2012 Roma Open

Final
- Champion: (Poland) Jerzy Janowicz
- Runner-up: (Luxembourg) Gilles Müller
- Score: 7–6^{(7–3)}, 6–3

Events
| Singles | Doubles |
| ← 2011 · | Roma Open | · 2013 → |

Simone Bolelli was the defending champion, but he lost in the semifinals to Gilles Müller, 3–6, 7–5, 6–7^{(1–7)}.
Jerzy Janowicz won the title defeating Gilles Müller in the final 7–6^{(7–3)}, 6–3.

== Seeds ==
1. (Luxembourg) Gilles Müller (final)
2. (Latvia) Ernests Gulbis (second round)
3. (Portugal) Rui Machado (semifinals)
4. (Italy) Simone Bolelli (semifinals)
5. (Croatia) Antonio Veić (quarterfinals)
6. (United Kingdom) James Ward (second round)
7. (France) Guillaume Rufin (second round)
8. (Russia) Andrey Kuznetsov (first round)

== Draw ==
=== Key ===
- Q = Qualifier
- WC = Wild card
- LL = Lucky loser
- Alt = Alternate
- SE = Special exempt
- PR = Protected ranking
- ITF = ITF entry
- JE = Junior exempt
- w/o = Walkover
- r = Retired
- d = Defaulted
- SR = Special ranking

=== Finals ===
Semifinals
1 | (Luxembourg) Gilles Müller | 6 | 5 | 7^{7}
4 | (Italy) Simone Bolelli | 3 | 7 | 6^{1}
3 | (Portugal) Rui Machado | 2 | 5
(Poland) Jerzy Janowicz | 6 | 7

Final
1 | (Luxembourg) Gilles Müller | 6^{3} | 3
(Poland) Jerzy Janowicz | 7^{7} | 6

=== Top half ===
First round
1 | (Luxembourg) G Müller | 3 | 6 | 6
Q | (Switzerland) H Laaksonen | 6 | 4 | 4
(Belgium) M Authom | 6 | 7
(Argentina) F Bagnis | 4 | 5
(Italy) M Viola | 2 | 4
WC | (Italy) T Fabbiano | 6 | 6
(Italy) S Vagnozzi | 6^{1} | 2
7 | (France) G Rufin | 7^{7} | 6
4 | (Italy) S Bolelli | 6 | 6
(Lithuania) R Berankis | 2 | 2
(Australia) J Duckworth | 6 | 3
(United States) D Kudla | 3 | 1^{r}
WC | (Italy) A Brizzi | 4 | 1
(Germany) S Greul | 6 | 6
WC | (Italy) Marco Cecchinato | 3 | 4
6 | (United Kingdom) J Ward | 6 | 6

Second round
1 | (Luxembourg) G Müller | 6^{2} | 6 | 6
(Belgium) M Authom | 7^{7} | 1 | 2
WC | (Italy) T Fabbiano | 7^{7} | 4 | 7
7 | (France) G Rufin | 6^{4} | 6 | 5
4 | (Italy) S Bolelli | 6 | 6^{5} | 6
(Australia) J Duckworth | 4 | 7^{7} | 3
(Germany) S Greul | 6 | 6
6 | (United Kingdom) J Ward | 2 | 1

Quarterfinals
1 | (Luxembourg) G Müller | 6 | 3 | 6
WC | (Italy) T Fabbiano | 3 | 6 | 3
4 | (Italy) S Bolelli | 6 | 6
(Germany) S Greul | 3 | 1

Semifinals
1 | (Luxembourg) G Müller | 6 | 5 | 7^{7}
4 | (Italy) S Bolelli | 3 | 7 | 6^{1}

=== Bottom half ===
First round
5 | (Croatia) A Veić | 6 | 3 | 6
(Netherlands) J Huta Galung | 1 | 6 | 2
WC | (Italy) G Quinzi | 3 | 0
Q | (Serbia) B Pašanski | 6 | 6
(Germany) P Gojowczyk | 6 | 2 | 1
SE | (Slovakia) A Martin | 4 | 6 | 6
(Japan) Y Sugita | 2 | 1
3 | (Portugal) R Machado | 6 | 6
8 | (Russia) A Kuznetsov | 6^{8} | 6 | 2
Q | (Italy) W Trusendi | 7^{10} | 2 | 6
Q | (United States) R Williams | 7^{7} | 4 | 6
(Spain) A Menéndez | 6^{4} | 6 | 3
(France) J Ouanna | 4 | 6 | 3
(Poland) J Janowicz | 6 | 4 | 6
(France) M Teixeira | 6 | 4 | 3
2 | (Latvia) E Gulbis | 4 | 6 | 6

Second round
5 | (Croatia) A Veić | 7^{9} | 2
Q | (Serbia) B Pašanski | 6^{7} | 0^{r}
SE | (Slovakia) A Martin | 2 | 6 | 2
3 | (Portugal) R Machado | 6 | 2 | 6
Q | (Italy) W Trusendi | 1 | 4
Q | (United States) R Williams | 6 | 6
(Poland) J Janowicz | 6 | 3 | 6
2 | (Latvia) E Gulbis | 2 | 6 | 4

Quarterfinals
5 | (Croatia) A Veić | 3 | 6^{3}
3 | (Portugal) R Machado | 6 | 7^{7}
Q | (United States) R Williams | 3 | 3
(Poland) J Janowicz | 6 | 6

Semifinals
3 | (Portugal) R Machado | 2 | 5
(Poland) J Janowicz | 6 | 7
