= 2019 Garden Open – Singles =

Singles
- 2019 Garden Open

Final
- Champion: (Switzerland) Henri Laaksonen
- Runner-up: (Italy) Gian Marco Moroni
- Score: 6–7^{(2–7)}, 7–6^{(7–2)}, 6–2

Events
Singles	Doubles
← 2018 ·	Garden Open	· 2021 →

Adam Pavlásek was the defending champion but lost in the semifinals to Gian Marco Moroni.

Henri Laaksonen won the title after defeating Moroni 6–7^{(2–7)}, 7–6^{(7–2)}, 6–2 in the final.

== Seeds ==
All seeds receive a bye into the second round.

1. (Germany) Maximilian Marterer (second round, retired)
2. (Italy) Paolo Lorenzi (semifinals)
3. (United States) Ryan Harrison (withdrew)
4. (Switzerland) Henri Laaksonen (champion)
5. (Poland) Kamil Majchrzak (quarterfinals)
6. (Slovakia) Jozef Kovalík (third round)
7. (Germany) Oscar Otte (third round)
8. (Italy) Salvatore Caruso (quarterfinals)
9. (Slovakia) Filip Horanský (quarterfinals, retired)
10. (Italy) Stefano Napolitano (quarterfinals)
11. (Italy) Roberto Marcora (third round)
12. (Croatia) Viktor Galović (third round)
13. (Italy) Federico Gaio (third round)
14. (Czech Republic) Adam Pavlásek (semifinals)
15. (Hungary) Attila Balázs (second round)
16. (Italy) Matteo Viola (third round)
17. (Italy) Gian Marco Moroni (final)

== Draw ==
=== Key ===
- Q = Qualifier
- WC = Wild card
- LL = Lucky loser
- Alt = Alternate
- SE = Special exempt
- PR = Protected ranking
- ITF = ITF entry
- JE = Junior exempt
- w/o = Walkover
- r = Retired
- d = Defaulted
- SR = Special ranking

=== Finals ===
Quarterfinals
14	(Czech Republic) Adam Pavlásek	6	7^{7}
5	(Poland) Kamil Majchrzak	3	6^{2}
17	(Italy) Gian Marco Moroni	6	1
9	(Slovakia) Filip Horanský	4	0^{r}
8	(Italy) Salvatore Caruso	4	4
4	(Switzerland) Henri Laaksonen	6	6
10	(Italy) Stefano Napolitano	3	2
2	(Italy) Paolo Lorenzi	6	6

Semifinals
14	(Czech Republic) Adam Pavlásek	1	1
17	(Italy) Gian Marco Moroni	6	6
4	(Switzerland) Henri Laaksonen	7^{7}	6^{5}	6
2	(Italy) Paolo Lorenzi	6^{5}	7^{7}	1

Final
17	(Italy) Gian Marco Moroni	7^{7}	6^{2}	2
4	(Switzerland) Henri Laaksonen	6^{2}	7^{7}	6

=== Top half ===
==== Section 1 ====
First round
ITF	(Italy) R Bonadio	6	6
WC	(Italy) F Passaro	3	3
Q	(Italy) Nicolò Turchetti	2	2
(Bosnia and Herzegovina) T Brkić	6	6
ITF	(Argentina) H Casanova	6	4	6
(Serbia) D Petrović	4	6	2
WC	(Italy) Emiliano Maggioli	2	3
(Russia) Kirill Kivattsev	6	6

Second round
1	(Germany) M Marterer	6	3	0^{r}
ITF	(Italy) R Bonadio	1	6	0
(Bosnia and Herzegovina) T Brkić	6	3	2
14	(Czech Republic) A Pavlásek	3	6	6
11	(Italy) R Marcora	6	1	6
ITF	(Argentina) H Casanova	2	6	2
(Russia) K Kivattsev	3	6^{6}
5	(Poland) K Majchrzak	6	7^{8}

Third round
ITF	(Italy) R Bonadio	3	1
14	(Czech Republic) A Pavlásek	6	6
11	(Italy) R Marcora	3	6^{2}
5	(Poland) K Majchrzak	6	7^{7}

Quarterfinals
14	(Czech Republic) A Pavlásek	6	7^{7}
5	(Poland) K Majchrzak	3	6^{2}

==== Section 2 ====
First round
(United States) U Blanch	6	7
(India) S Nagal	2	5
(Hungary) M Valkusz	6	6
WC	(Italy) J Ocleppo	2	2
(Czech Republic) V Šafránek	2	6	6
Q	(Switzerland) L Margaroli	6	3	4
(United Kingdom) B Klein	2	2
(Argentina) JP Ficovich	6	6

Second round
17	(Italy) GM Moroni	6	6
(United States) U Blanch	2	3
(Hungary) M Valkusz	6	6
15	(Hungary) A Balázs	4	3
9	(Slovakia) F Horanský	6	4	6
(Czech Republic) V Šafránek	3	6	3
(Argentina) JP Ficovich	6^{3}	2
7	(Germany) O Otte	7^{7}	6

Third round
17	(Italy) GM Moroni	6
(Hungary) M Valkusz	5^{r}
9	(Slovakia) F Horanský	6	7^{7}
7	(Germany) O Otte	4	6^{5}

Quarterfinals
17	(Italy) GM Moroni	6	1
9	(Slovakia) F Horanský	4	0^{r}

=== Bottom half ===
==== Section 3 ====
First round
Alt	(Germany) P Torebko	6	5	0^{r}
(Italy) A Bega	4	7	1
(Croatia) A Pavić	4	4
(Argentina) A Collarini	6	6
(France) TK Wang	6^{6}	1^{r}
(Argentina) R Olivo	7^{8}	4
ITF	(Germany) Peter Heller	6	6
ITF	(France) G Jacq	3	3

Second round
8	(Italy) S Caruso	6	6
(Italy) A Bega	4	1
(Argentina) A Collarini	6	4	4
12	(Croatia) V Galović	3	6	6
16	(Italy) M Viola	6	7
(Argentina) R Olivo	3	5
ITF	(Germany) P Heller	2	1
4	(Switzerland) H Laaksonen	6	6

Third round
8	(Italy) S Caruso	6	6
12	(Croatia) V Galović	3	4
16	(Italy) M Viola	4	3
4	(Switzerland) H Laaksonen	6	6

Quarterfinals
8	(Italy) S Caruso	4	4
4	(Switzerland) H Laaksonen	6	6

==== Section 4 ====
First round
(Slovakia) A Molčan	7^{7}	3	4
WC	(Italy) Federico Iannaccone	6^{4}	6	6
ITF	(Tunisia) S Mansouri	6^{3}	7^{8}	5
(Germany) J Härteis	7^{7}	6^{6}	7
(Spain) Carlos Boluda-Purkiss	6^{4}	6	6
(Italy) Fabrizio Ornago	7^{7}	4	1
(Romania) D Dima	2	5
(Brazil) P Sakamoto	6	7

Second round
6	(Slovakia) J Kovalík	6	6
WC	(Italy) F Iannaccone	0	2
(Germany) J Härteis	2	3
10	(Italy) S Napolitano	6	6
13	(Italy) F Gaio	6	6
(Spain) C Boluda-Purkiss	4	4
(Brazil) P Sakamoto	2	6	1
2	(Italy) P Lorenzi	6	2	6

Third round
6	(Slovakia) J Kovalík	6^{3}	6	5
10	(Italy) S Napolitano	7^{7}	3	7
13	(Italy) F Gaio	1	4
2	(Italy) P Lorenzi	6	6

Quarterfinals
10	(Italy) S Napolitano	3	2
2	(Italy) P Lorenzi	6	6
