= 2022 Garden Open – Doubles =

Doubles
- 2022 Garden Open

Final
- Champions: (Netherlands) Jesper de Jong (Netherlands) Bart Stevens
- Runners-up: (France) Sadio Doumbia (France) Fabien Reboul
- Score: 3–6, 7–5, [10–8]

Events
Singles	Doubles
← 2021 ·	Garden Open	· 2023 →

Sadio Doumbia and Fabien Reboul were the two-time defending champions but lost in the final to Jesper de Jong and Bart Stevens.

De Jong and Stevens won the title after defeating Doumbia and Reboul 3–6, 7–5, [10–8] in the final.

== Seeds ==
1. (France) Sadio Doumbia / (France) Fabien Reboul (final)
2. (Netherlands) Jesper de Jong / (Netherlands) Bart Stevens (champions)
3. (India) Arjun Kadhe / (Spain) Sergio Martos Gornés (first round)
4. (France) Albano Olivetti / (Switzerland) Leandro Riedi (semifinals)

== Draw ==
=== Key ===
- Q = Qualifier
- WC = Wild card
- LL = Lucky loser
- Alt = Alternate
- SE = Special exempt
- PR = Protected ranking
- ITF = ITF entry
- JE = Junior exempt
- w/o = Walkover
- r = Retired
- d = Defaulted
- SR = Special ranking

First round
1	(France) S Doumbia (France) F Reboul	6	4	[10]
(Germany) F Fallert (Germany) H Jebens	1	6	[8]
(France) D Added (Belgium) M Geerts	6	6
WC	(Italy) Alessio Balestrieri (Italy) Andrea Giallanza	1	1
4	(France) A Olivetti (Switzerland) L Riedi	2	6	[10]
(Italy) A Pellegrino (Croatia) N Serdarušić	6	4	[8]
(Italy) F Agamenone (Switzerland) L Margaroli	3	3
(France) J Eysseric (France) Q Halys	6	6
Alt	(Netherlands) G Smits (Kazakhstan) D Yevseyev	3	6	[10]
(Ukraine) D Molchanov (Germany) Niklas Schell	6	3	[5]
(Turkey) A Çelikbilek (Turkey) E Kırkın	6	6^{3}	[10]
3	(India) A Kadhe (Spain) S Martos Gornés	4	7^{7}	[3]
(France) E Couacaud (France) M Guinard	7	6
WC	(Italy) S Napolitano (Italy) G Zeppieri	5	3
(India) S Balaji (India) V Vardhan	6^{5}	2
2	(Netherlands) J de Jong (Netherlands) B Stevens	7^{7}	6

Quarterfinals
1	(France) S Doumbia (France) F Reboul	6	7^{7}
(France) D Added (Belgium) M Geerts	1	6^{4}
4	(France) A Olivetti (Switzerland) L Riedi	6	6
(France) J Eysseric (France) Q Halys	2	4
Alt	(Netherlands) G Smits (Kazakhstan) D Yevseyev	6^{5}	4
(Turkey) A Çelikbilek (Turkey) E Kırkın	7^{7}	6
(France) E Couacaud (France) M Guinard	3	4
2	(Netherlands) J de Jong (Netherlands) B Stevens	6	6

Semifinals
1	(France) S Doumbia (France) F Reboul	6	7^{7}
4	(France) A Olivetti (Switzerland) L Riedi	0	6^{5}
(Turkey) A Çelikbilek (Turkey) E Kırkın	1	1
2	(Netherlands) J de Jong (Netherlands) B Stevens	6	6

Final
1	(France) S Doumbia (France) F Reboul	6	5	[8]
2	(Netherlands) J de Jong (Netherlands) B Stevens	3	7	[10]
