= 2010 Roma Open – Doubles =

Doubles
- 2010 Roma Open

Final
- Champions: (Croatia) Mario Ančić (Croatia) Ivan Dodig
- Runners-up: (Argentina) Juan Pablo Brzezicki (Spain) Rubén Ramírez Hidalgo
- Score: 4–6, 7–6(8), [10–4]

Events
Singles	Doubles
← 2009 ·	Roma Open	· 2011 →

Simon Greul and Christopher Kas were the defending champions, but both chose to compete in Barcelona instead.
Mario Ančić and Ivan Dodig won in the final 4–6, 7–6(8), [10–4], against Juan Pablo Brzezicki and Rubén Ramírez Hidalgo.

== Seeds ==
1. (Switzerland) Yves Allegro / (South Africa) Jeff Coetzee (quarterfinals)
2. (Poland) Tomasz Bednarek / (Poland) Mateusz Kowalczyk (first round)
3. (United States) James Cerretani / (Canada) Adil Shamasdin (quarterfinals)
4. (Italy) Flavio Cipolla / (Italy) Alessandro Motti (first round)

== Draw ==
=== Key ===
- Q = Qualifier
- WC = Wild card
- LL = Lucky loser
- Alt = Alternate
- SE = Special exempt
- PR = Protected ranking
- ITF = ITF entry
- JE = Junior exempt
- w/o = Walkover
- r = Retired
- d = Defaulted
- SR = Special ranking

=== Draw ===
First round
1	(Switzerland) Y Allegro (South Africa) J Coetzee	6	6
WC	(Italy) C Battisti (Italy) P Macri	1	1
(Kazakhstan) Y Schukin (Croatia) A Veić	6	6
(Czech Republic) L Rosol (Russia) D Sitak	1	1
3	(United States) J Cerretani (Canada) A Shamasdin	1	6	[12]
(Portugal) F Gil (Portugal) R Machado	6	4	[10]
(Algeria) L Ouahab (Romania) A Ungur	6	2	[5]
(Argentina) JP Brzezicki (Spain) R Ramírez Hidalgo	4	6	[10]
(Italy) F Aldi (Italy) A Arnaboldi	6	6^{4}	[6]
(Italy) D Bracciali (Italy) M Trevisan	4	7	[10]
(Austria) R Eitzinger (Ukraine) A Smirnov	6	7
4	(Italy) F Cipolla (Italy) A Motti	3	5
WC	(Italy) A di Mauro (Italy) G Naso	3	4
(Russia) D Matsukevich (Austria) J Reister	6	6
(Croatia) M Ančić (Croatia) I Dodig	6	6^{6}	[10]
2	(Poland) T Bednarek (Poland) M Kowalczyk	3	7	[7]

Quarterfinals
1	(Switzerland) Y Allegro (South Africa) J Coetzee	6	1	[8]
(Kazakhstan) Y Schukin (Croatia) A Veić	1	7	[10]
3	(United States) J Cerretani (Canada) A Shamasdin	4	4
(Argentina) JP Brzezicki (Spain) R Ramírez Hidalgo	6	6
(Italy) D Bracciali (Italy) M Trevisan	2	6	[8]
(Austria) R Eitzinger (Ukraine) A Smirnov	6	3	[10]
(Russia) D Matsukevich (Austria) J Reister	4	0
(Croatia) M Ančić (Croatia) I Dodig	6	6

Semifinals
(Kazakhstan) Y Schukin (Croatia) A Veić	4	6^{5}
(Argentina) JP Brzezicki (Spain) R Ramírez Hidalgo	6	7
(Austria) R Eitzinger (Ukraine) A Smirnov	3	6^{4}
(Croatia) M Ančić (Croatia) I Dodig	6	7

Finals
(Argentina) JP Brzezicki (Spain) R Ramírez Hidalgo	6	6^{8}	[4]
(Croatia) M Ančić (Croatia) I Dodig	4	7	[10]
