= 2012 Roma Open – Doubles =

Doubles
- 2012 Roma Open

Final
- Champions: (United Kingdom) Jamie Delgado (United Kingdom) Ken Skupski
- Runners-up: (Spain) Adrián Menéndez (Italy) Walter Trusendi
- Score: 6–1, 6–4

Events
Singles	Doubles
← 2011 ·	Roma Open	· 2013 →

Juan Sebastián Cabal and Robert Farah were the defending champions but decided not to participate.
Jamie Delgado and Ken Skupski won the title defeating Adrián Menéndez and Walter Trusendi in the final 6–1, 6–4.

== Seeds ==
1. (United Kingdom) Jamie Delgado / (United Kingdom) Ken Skupski (champions)
2. (Australia) Colin Ebelthite / (India) Purav Raja (quarterfinals)
3. (Italy) Stefano Ianni / (Italy) Simone Vagnozzi (semifinals)
4. (Italy) Alessandro Motti / (Croatia) Antonio Veić (quarterfinals)

== Draw ==
=== Key ===
- Q = Qualifier
- WC = Wild card
- LL = Lucky loser
- Alt = Alternate
- SE = Special exempt
- PR = Protected ranking
- ITF = ITF entry
- JE = Junior exempt
- w/o = Walkover
- r = Retired
- d = Defaulted
- SR = Special ranking

=== Draw ===
First round
1	(United Kingdom) J Delgado (United Kingdom) K Skupski	7	6
WC	(Italy) Danilo Gargano (Italy) Paolo Macri	5	1
WC	(Italy) Andrea Giallanza (Italy) Alessio Luchetti	1	0
(Romania) A Dăescu (Romania) F Mergea	6	6
3	(Italy) S Ianni (Italy) S Vagnozzi	6	6
(Australia) J Duckworth (Australia) B Mitchell	2	2
(United States) N Monroe (United Kingdom) J Ward	5	6	[10]
(Switzerland) H Laaksonen (Serbia) B Pašanski	7	4	[0]
(United States) A Krajicek (United States) R Williams	4	5
WC	(Argentina) A Fabbri (Italy) M Jorquera	6	7
(Latvia) E Gulbis (Latvia) D Pavlovs	6^{8}	3
4	(Italy) A Motti (Croatia) A Veić	7^{10}	6
(Germany) S Greul (Germany) B Knittel	6	2	[7]
(Spain) A Menéndez (Italy) W Trusendi	2	6	[10]
(Netherlands) J Huta Galung (Japan) Y Sugita	2	1
2	(Australia) C Ebelthite (India) P Raja	6	6

Quarterfinals
1	(United Kingdom) J Delgado (United Kingdom) K Skupski	7	0	[10]
(Romania) A Dăescu (Romania) F Mergea	5	6	[7]
3	(Italy) S Ianni (Italy) S Vagnozzi	6	6
(United States) N Monroe (United Kingdom) J Ward	3	3
WC	(Argentina) A Fabbri (Italy) M Jorquera	6	1	[10]
4	(Italy) A Motti (Croatia) A Veić	3	6	[4]
(Spain) A Menéndez (Italy) W Trusendi	6^{3}	7	[10]
2	(Australia) C Ebelthite (India) P Raja	7^{7}	5	[8]

Semifinals
1	(United Kingdom) J Delgado (United Kingdom) K Skupski	6	7
3	(Italy) S Ianni (Italy) S Vagnozzi	4	5
WC	(Argentina) A Fabbri (Italy) M Jorquera	1	1
(Spain) A Menéndez (Italy) W Trusendi	6	6

Final
1	(United Kingdom) J Delgado (United Kingdom) K Skupski	6	6
(Spain) A Menéndez (Italy) W Trusendi	1	4
