= 2017 Garden Open – Doubles =

Doubles
- 2017 Garden Open

Final
- Champions: (Germany) Andreas Mies (Germany) Oscar Otte
- Runners-up: (Belgium) Kimmer Coppejans (Hungary) Márton Fucsovics
- Score: 4–6, 7–6^{(14–12)}, [10–8]

Events
Singles	Doubles
← 2016 ·	Garden Open	· 2018 →

Bai Yan and Li Zhe were the defending champions but chose not to defend their title.

Andreas Mies and Oscar Otte won the title after defeating Kimmer Coppejans and Márton Fucsovics 4–6, 7–6^{(14–12)}, [10–8] in the final.

== Seeds ==
1. (Australia) Sam Groth / (Sweden) Robert Lindstedt (first round, withdrew)
2. (Canada) Adil Shamasdin / (Slovakia) Igor Zelenay (quarterfinals)
3. (India) Jeevan Nedunchezhiyan / (Indonesia) Christopher Rungkat (first round)
4. (Italy) Riccardo Ghedin / (Switzerland) Luca Margaroli (first round)

== Draw ==
=== Key ===
- Q = Qualifier
- WC = Wild card
- LL = Lucky loser
- Alt = Alternate
- SE = Special exempt
- PR = Protected ranking
- ITF = ITF entry
- JE = Junior exempt
- w/o = Walkover
- r = Retired
- d = Defaulted
- SR = Special ranking

First round
1	(Australia) S Groth (Sweden) R Lindstedt
WC	(Bosnia and Herzegovina) T Brkić (Italy) F Cipolla	w/o
(Germany) M Marterer (Italy) A Motti	3	6	[8]
(Czech Republic) R Jebavý (Czech Republic) J Veselý	6	0	[10]
4	(Italy) R Ghedin (Switzerland) L Margaroli	3	3
(Germany) A Mies (Germany) O Otte	6	6
(Portugal) G Elias (Brazil) F Neis	6	4	[10]
Alt	(Spain) R Ramírez Hidalgo (Greece) S Tsitsipas	3	6	[6]
(Kazakhstan) A Bublik (Italy) L Giustino	6	3	[7]
(Argentina) N Kicker (Argentina) A Velotti	4	6	[10]
(Belgium) K Coppejans (Hungary) M Fucsovics	7^{7}	6
3	(India) J Nedunchezhiyan (Indonesia) C Rungkat	6^{3}	3
WC	(Italy) G Quinzi (Italy) L Vanni	4	6^{9}
WC	(Italy) M Cecchinato (Italy) M Donati	6	7^{11}
(Poland) T Bednarek (Australia) R Junaid	7	2	[8]
2	(Canada) A Shamasdin (Slovakia) I Zelenay	5	6	[10]

Quarterfinals
WC	(Bosnia and Herzegovina) T Brkić (Italy) F Cipolla	6	6
(Czech Republic) R Jebavý (Czech Republic) J Veselý	4	3
(Germany) A Mies (Germany) O Otte	6	6
(Portugal) G Elias (Brazil) F Neis	1	2
(Argentina) N Kicker (Argentina) A Velotti	3	2
(Belgium) K Coppejans (Hungary) M Fucsovics	6	6
WC	(Italy) M Cecchinato (Italy) M Donati	2	7^{7}	[10]
2	(Canada) A Shamasdin (Slovakia) I Zelenay	6	6^{5}	[6]

Semifinals
WC	(Bosnia and Herzegovina) T Brkić (Italy) F Cipolla	2	6^{1}
(Germany) A Mies (Germany) O Otte	6	7^{7}
(Belgium) K Coppejans (Hungary) M Fucsovics	6	6
WC	(Italy) M Cecchinato (Italy) M Donati	2	2

Final
(Germany) A Mies (Germany) O Otte	4	7^{14}	[10]
(Belgium) K Coppejans (Hungary) M Fucsovics	6	6^{12}	[8]
