= 2018 Garden Open =

- Date: 7–12 May
- Edition: 10th
- Draw: 32S / 16D
- Surface: Clay
- Location: Rome, Italy

Champions

Singles
- (Czech Republic) Adam Pavlásek

Doubles
- (Germany) Kevin Krawietz / (Germany) Andreas Mies
← 2017 ·	Garden Open	· 2019 →

The 2018 Garden Open was a professional tennis tournament played on clay courts. It was the tenth edition of the tournament which was part of the 2018 ATP Challenger Tour. It took place in Rome, Italy between 7 and 12 May 2018.

== Singles main-draw entrants ==
=== Seeds ===
Country	Player	Rank^{1}	Seed
BEL	Ruben Bemelmans	106	1
SRB	Laslo Đere	110	2
~~JPN~~	~~Taro Daniel~~	~~114~~	~~3~~
~~GER~~	~~Yannick Maden~~	~~119~~	~~4~~
BRA	Rogério Dutra Silva	121	5
FRA	Quentin Halys	125	6
SVK	Jozef Kovalík	127	7
ITA	Simone Bolelli	153	8

- ^{1} Rankings as of 30 April 2018.

=== Other entrants ===
The following players received wildcards into the singles main draw:

- (Italy) Riccardo Balzerani
- (Italy) Raúl Brancaccio
- (Italy) Giovanni Fonio
- (Italy) Gianluigi Quinzi

The following player received entry into the singles main draw as a special exempt:

- (Italy) Matteo Viola

The following player received entry into the singles main draw as an alternate:

- (Brazil) Rogério Dutra Silva

The following players received entry from the qualifying draw:

- (Spain) Íñigo Cervantes
- (Austria) Andreas Haider-Maurer
- (Germany) Kevin Krawietz
- (Spain) Bernabé Zapata Miralles

The following players received entry as lucky losers:

- (Argentina) Patricio Heras
- (Italy) Roberto Marcora
- (Spain) Alberto Romero de Ávila Senise

== Champions ==
=== Singles ===
- (Czech Republic) Adam Pavlásek def. (Serbia) Laslo Đere 7–6^{(7–1)}, 6–7^{(9–11)}, 6–4.

=== Doubles ===
- (Germany) Kevin Krawietz / (Germany) Andreas Mies def. (Belgium) Sander Gillé / (Belgium) Joran Vliegen 6–3, 2–6, [10–4].
