= 2009 Roma Open – Doubles =

Doubles
- 2009 Roma Open

Final
- Champions: (Germany) Simon Greul (Germany) Christopher Kas
- Runners-up: (Sweden) Johan Brunström (Netherlands Antilles) Jean-Julien Rojer
- Score: 4–6, 7–6(2), [10–2]

Events
Singles	Doubles
← 2008 ·	Roma Open	· 2010 →

Flavio Cipolla and Simone Vagnozzi were the defenders of championship title, but Cipolla decided to not participate this year.
Vagnozzi chose to play with Leonardo Azzaro, however they lost to James Cerretani and Amir Hadad in the first round.
Simon Greul and Christopher Kas won in the final 4–6, 7–6(2), [10–2], against Johan Brunström and Jean-Julien Rojer.

== Seeds ==
1. (Sweden) Johan Brunström / (Netherlands Antilles) Jean-Julien Rojer (final)
2. (Austria) Daniel Köllerer / (Netherlands) Rogier Wassen (quarterfinals)
3. (Argentina) Brian Dabul / (Argentina) Sebastián Prieto (semifinals)
4. (France) Olivier Charroin / (France) Nicolas Tourte (first round)

== Draw ==
=== Key ===
- Q = Qualifier
- WC = Wild card
- LL = Lucky loser
- Alt = Alternate
- SE = Special exempt
- PR = Protected ranking
- ITF = ITF entry
- JE = Junior exempt
- w/o = Walkover
- r = Retired
- d = Defaulted
- SR = Special ranking

=== Draw ===
First round
1	(Sweden) J Brunström (Netherlands Antilles) J-J Rojer	7	6
(Italy) M Crugnola (Italy) T Tenconi	6^{0}	3
(Italy) L Azzaro (Italy) S Vagnozzi	2	5
(United States) J Cerretani (Israel) A Hadad	6	7
4	(France) O Charroin (France) N Tourte	2	4
ALT	(Uzbekistan) D Istomin (Russia) D Sitak	6	6
(Italy) F Colangelo (Italy) A Motti	6	6
WC	(Italy) D Gargano (Italy) P Macri	2	4
WC	(Italy) D Sanguinetti (Japan) T Suzuki	4	1
(South Africa) K Anderson (Serbia) I Bozoljac	6	6
(Italy) G Petrazzuolo (Germany) S Stadler	2	6	[6]
3	(Argentina) B Dabul (Argentina) S Prieto	6	3	[10]
(Germany) S Greul (Germany) C Kas	6	6
(Italy) D Bracciali (Italy) F Volandri	2	4
(Netherlands) J Huta Galung (Czech Republic) D Karol	2	5
2	(Austria) D Köllerer (Netherlands) R Wassen	6	7

Quarterfinals
1	(Sweden) J Brunström (Netherlands Antilles) J-J Rojer	6	6
(United States) J Cerretani (Israel) A Hadad	2	4
ALT	(Uzbekistan) D Istomin (Russia) D Sitak	6	6
(Italy) F Colangelo (Italy) A Motti	4	1
(South Africa) K Anderson (Serbia) I Bozoljac	4	4
3	(Argentina) B Dabul (Argentina) S Prieto	6	6
(Germany) S Greul (Germany) C Kas	6	6
2	(Austria) D Köllerer (Netherlands) R Wassen	4	2

Semifinals
1	(Sweden) J Brunström (Netherlands Antilles) J-J Rojer	6	6
ALT	(Uzbekistan) D Istomin (Russia) D Sitak	3	3
3	(Argentina) B Dabul (Argentina) S Prieto	3	7	[16]
(Germany) S Greul (Germany) C Kas	6	6^{6}	[18]

Finals
1	(Sweden) J Brunström (Netherlands Antilles) J-J Rojer	6	6^{2}	[2]
(Germany) S Greul (Germany) C Kas	4	7	[10]
