= 2015 Garden Open – Singles =

Singles
- 2015 Garden Open

Final
- Champion: (United Kingdom) Aljaž Bedene
- Runner-up: (Czech Republic) Adam Pavlásek
- Score: 7−5, 6−2

Events
Singles	Doubles
← 2014 ·	Garden Open	· 2016 →

Julian Reister was the defending champion, but decided not to compete.
Aljaž Bedene won the tournament, defeating Adam Pavlásek 7−5, 6−2.

== Seeds ==
1. (United Kingdom) Aljaž Bedene (champion)
2. (Germany) Dustin Brown (quarterfinals)
3. (Czech Republic) Radek Štěpánek (first round)
4. (United Kingdom) Kyle Edmund (quarterfinals)
5. (Italy) Marco Cecchinato (semifinals)
6. (Japan) Taro Daniel (quarterfinals)
7. (Russia) Konstantin Kravchuk (first round)
8. (Sweden) Elias Ymer (second round)

== Draw ==
=== Key ===
- Q = Qualifier
- WC = Wild card
- LL = Lucky loser
- Alt = Alternate
- SE = Special exempt
- PR = Protected ranking
- ITF = ITF entry
- JE = Junior exempt
- w/o = Walkover
- r = Retired
- d = Defaulted
- SR = Special ranking

=== Finals ===
Semifinals
1	(United Kingdom) Aljaž Bedene	6	6
(Italy) Potito Starace	4	3
5/WC	(Italy) Marco Cecchinato	5	6	4
SE	(Czech Republic) Adam Pavlásek	7	3	6

Final
1	(United Kingdom) Aljaž Bedene	7	6
SE	(Czech Republic) Adam Pavlásek	5	2

=== Top half ===
First round
1	(United Kingdom) A Bedene	7^{9}	6
WC	(Italy) F Baldi	6^{7}	1
(Belgium) M Authom	6	3	6
(Spain) R Ramírez Hidalgo	3	6	2
WC	(Italy) L Sonego	6	1	0
(Italy) T Fabbiano	3	6	6
(Austria) G Melzer	6^{2}	6	0^{r}
6	(Japan) T Daniel	7^{7}	2	3
4	(United Kingdom) K Edmund	6	6
(Chile) H Podlipnik Castillo	3	3
(Czech Republic) J Mertl	4	2
Q	(Italy) M Berrettini	6	6
(Ukraine) D Molchanov	4	0
(Slovakia) A Martin	6	6
(Italy) P Starace	7^{7}	3	6
7	(Russia) K Kravchuk	6^{2}	6	1

Second round
1	(United Kingdom) A Bedene	6	6
(Belgium) M Authom	1	2
(Italy) T Fabbiano	6^{2}	6	4
6	(Japan) T Daniel	7^{7}	2	6
4	(United Kingdom) K Edmund	6	6
Q	(Italy) M Berrettini	3	3
(Slovakia) A Martin	0	6	6^{2}
(Italy) P Starace	6	4	7^{7}

Quarterfinals
1	(United Kingdom) A Bedene	6	6
6	(Japan) T Daniel	2	4
4	(United Kingdom) K Edmund	4	4
(Italy) P Starace	6	6

Semifinals
1	(United Kingdom) A Bedene	6	6
(Italy) P Starace	4	3

=== Bottom half ===
First round
5/WC	(Italy) M Cecchinato	7	6
(Italy) R Marcora	5	2
(Argentina) M Trungelliti	6^{4}	3
WC	(Russia) A Rublev	7^{7}	6
Q	(Russia) K Khachanov	6	2	2
Q	(Argentina) P Cachin	1	6	6
(Romania) A Ungur	6	6^{4}	7^{7}
3	(Czech Republic) R Štěpánek	3	7^{7}	6^{3}
8	(Sweden) E Ymer	3	6	6
(Slovakia) M Mečíř Jr.	6	1	1
SE	(Czech Republic) A Pavlásek	7	6
LL	(Italy) S Travaglia	5	4
(Italy) A Arnaboldi	6^{4}	3
(Croatia) M Delić	7^{7}	6
Q	(Italy) F Cipolla	2	2
2	(Germany) D Brown	6	6

Second round
5/WC	(Italy) M Cecchinato	6	6
WC	(Russia) A Rublev	1	4
Q	(Argentina) P Cachin	3	4
(Romania) A Ungur	6	6
8	(Sweden) E Ymer	2	4
SE	(Czech Republic) A Pavlásek	6	6
(Croatia) M Delić	2	4
2	(Germany) D Brown	6	6

Quarterfinals
5/WC	(Italy) M Cecchinato	6	6
(Romania) A Ungur	3	4
SE	(Czech Republic) A Pavlásek	6	6
2	(Germany) D Brown	3	2

Semifinals
5/WC	(Italy) M Cecchinato	5	6	4
SE	(Czech Republic) A Pavlásek	7	3	6
