= 2011 Roma Open – Doubles =

Doubles
- 2011 Roma Open

Final
- Champions: (Colombia) Juan Sebastián Cabal (Colombia) Robert Farah
- Runners-up: (Mexico) Santiago González (United States) Travis Rettenmaier
- Score: 2–6, 6–3, [11–9]

Events
Singles	Doubles
← 2010 ·	Roma Open	· 2012 →

Mario Ančić and Ivan Dodig were the defending champions, but decided not to participate.
Colombian players Juan Sebastián Cabal and Robert Farah defeated Santiago González and Travis Rettenmaier 2–6, 6–3, [11–9] in the final.

== Seeds ==
1. (Mexico) Santiago González / (United States) Travis Rettenmaier (final)
2. (Switzerland) Yves Allegro / (Italy) Daniele Bracciali (first round)
3. (Germany) Dustin Brown / (Germany) Martin Emmrich (first round)
4. (Sweden) Johan Brunström / (Denmark) Frederik Nielsen (first round)

== Draw ==
=== Key ===
- Q = Qualifier
- WC = Wild card
- LL = Lucky loser
- Alt = Alternate
- SE = Special exempt
- PR = Protected ranking
- ITF = ITF entry
- JE = Junior exempt
- w/o = Walkover
- r = Retired
- d = Defaulted
- SR = Special ranking

=== Draw ===
First round
1	(Mexico) S González (United States) T Rettenmaier	6	6
(Italy) A di Mauro (Italy) S Vagnozzi	3	3
WC	(Italy) Andrea Giallanza (Italy) Paolo Macrì	2	2
(United States) T Parrott (Sweden) A Siljeström	6	6
4	(Sweden) J Brunström (Denmark) F Nielsen	2	0
(Chile) P Capdeville (Argentina) E Schwank	6	6
WC	(Italy) D Giorgini (Italy) P Lorenzi	5	4
(United States) D Martin (Italy) A Motti	7	6
(Austria) M Fischer (Austria) M Slanar	5	6	[10]
(Italy) T Fabbiano (Italy) A Giannessi	7	1	[8]
(Poland) T Bednarek (Poland) M Kowalczyk	6	6
3	(Germany) D Brown (Germany) M Emmrich	4	2
(Colombia) JS Cabal (Colombia) R Farah	6	4	[12]
(Germany) T Kamke (Germany) J Reister	3	6	[10]
Alt	(France) M Gicquel (France) É Roger-Vasselin	6	6
2	(Switzerland) Y Allegro (Italy) D Bracciali	1	3

Quarterfinals
1	(Mexico) S González (United States) T Rettenmaier	6	7
(United States) T Parrott (Sweden) A Siljeström	1	5
(Chile) P Capdeville (Argentina) E Schwank	6	1	[12]
(United States) D Martin (Italy) A Motti	4	6	[10]
(Austria) M Fischer (Austria) M Slanar	2	4
(Poland) T Bednarek (Poland) M Kowalczyk	6	6
(Colombia) JS Cabal (Colombia) R Farah	w/o
Alt	(France) M Gicquel (France) É Roger-Vasselin

Semifinals
1	(Mexico) S González (United States) T Rettenmaier	7	7
(Chile) P Capdeville (Argentina) E Schwank	5	5
(Poland) T Bednarek (Poland) M Kowalczyk	6^{2}	2
(Colombia) JS Cabal (Colombia) R Farah	7	6

Final
1	(Mexico) S González (United States) T Rettenmaier	6	3	[9]
(Colombia) JS Cabal (Colombia) R Farah	2	6	[11]
