= 2015 Garden Open =

- Date: 4 – 9 May
- Edition: 7th
- Draw: 32S / 15D
- Prize money: €42,500
- Surface: Clay
- Location: Rome, Italy

Champions

Singles
- (United Kingdom) Aljaž Bedene

Doubles
- (Germany) Dustin Brown / (Czech Republic) František Čermák
← 2014 ·	Garden Open	· 2016 →

The 2015 Garden Open was a professional tennis tournament played on clay courts. It was the seventh edition of the tournament which was part of the 2015 ATP Challenger Tour. It took place in Rome, Italy between 4 and 9 May 2015.

== Singles main-draw entrants ==
=== Seeds ===
Country	Player	Rank^{1}	Seed
GBR	Aljaž Bedene	91	1
GER	Dustin Brown	102	2
CZE	Radek Štěpánek	120	3
GBR	Kyle Edmund	130	4
ITA	Marco Cecchinato	150	5
JPN	Taro Daniel	164	6
RUS	Konstantin Kravchuk	167	7
SWE	Elias Ymer	171	8

- ^{1} Rankings are as of April 27, 2015.

=== Other entrants ===
The following players received wildcards into the singles main draw:

- (Italy) Filippo Baldi
- (Italy) Marco Cecchinato
- (Russia) Andrey Rublev
- (Italy) Lorenzo Sonego

The following players received entry as a special exempt to gain entry into the main draw:

- (Czech Republic) Adam Pavlásek

The following players received entry from the qualifying draw:

- (Russia) Karen Khachanov
- (Argentina) Pedro Cachin
- (Italy) Flavio Cipolla
- (Italy) Matteo Berrettini

The following player received entry as a lucky loser:

- (Italy) Stefano Travaglia

== Doubles main-draw entrants ==
=== Seeds ===
Country	Player	Country	Player	Rank^{1}	Seed
GER	Dustin Brown	CZE	František Čermák	143	1
GER	Gero Kretschmer	GER	Alexander Satschko	201	2
NED	Wesley Koolhof	NED	Matwé Middelkoop	282	3
CZE	Roman Jebavý	UKR	Denys Molchanov	323	4

- ^{1} Rankings as of April 28, 2015.

=== Other entrants ===
The following pairs received wildcards into the doubles main draw:

- (Italy) Giulio Di Meo / (Italy) Potito Starace
- (Italy) Lorenzo Sonego / (Italy) Stefano Travaglia
- (Italy) Filippo Baldi / (Italy) Matteo Berrettini

== Champions ==
=== Singles ===
- (United Kingdom) Aljaž Bedene def. (Czech Republic) Adam Pavlásek 7−5, 6−2

=== Doubles ===
- (Germany) Dustin Brown / (Czech Republic) František Čermák def. (Argentina) Andrés Molteni / (Argentina) Marco Trungelliti, 6–1, 6–2
