= 2017 Garden Open =

- Date: 8 – 13 May
- Edition: 9th
- Draw: 32S / 16D
- Surface: Clay
- Location: Rome, Italy

Champions

Singles
- (Italy) Marco Cecchinato

Doubles
- (Germany) Andreas Mies / (Germany) Oscar Otte
← 2016 ·	Garden Open	· 2018 →

The 2017 Garden Open was a professional tennis tournament played on clay courts. It was the ninth edition of the tournament which was part of the 2017 ATP Challenger Tour. It took place in Rome, Italy between 8 and 13 May 2017.

== Singles main-draw entrants ==
=== Seeds ===
Country	Player	Rank^{1}	Seed
CZE	Jiří Veselý	59	1
ARG	Nicolás Kicker	93	2
CZE	Adam Pavlásek	106	3
POR	Gastão Elias	107	4
SVK	Andrej Martin	114	5
GER	Maximilian Marterer	128	6
GER	Tobias Kamke	140	7
KAZ	Alexander Bublik	145	8

- ^{1} Rankings as of May 1, 2017.

=== Other entrants ===
The following players received wildcards into the singles main draw:

- (Italy) Riccardo Bellotti
- (Italy) Matteo Donati
- (Italy) Gianluigi Quinzi
- (Greece) Stefanos Tsitsipas

The following player received entry into the singles main draw as an alternate:

- (Argentina) Agustín Velotti

The following player received entry into the singles main draw as a special exempt:

- (Italy) Stefano Travaglia

The following players received entry from the qualifying draw:

- (Germany) Yannick Maden
- (Germany) Oscar Otte
- (Poland) Maciej Rajski
- (China) Wu Di

== Champions ==
=== Singles ===
- (Italy) Marco Cecchinato def. (Slovakia) Jozef Kovalík 6–4, 6–4.

=== Doubles ===
- (Germany) Andreas Mies / (Germany) Oscar Otte def. (Belgium) Kimmer Coppejans / (Hungary) Márton Fucsovics 4–6, 7–6^{(14–12)}, [10–8].
