= 2009 Roma Open =

- Date: April 20 – April 26
- Edition: 8th
- Location: Rome, Italy

Champions

Singles
- (Austria) Daniel Köllerer

Doubles
- (Germany) Simon Greul / (Germany) Christopher Kas
← 2008 ·	Roma Open	· 2010 →

The 2009 Roma Open was a professional tennis tournament played on outdoor red clay courts. It was part of the 2009 ATP Challenger Tour. It took place in Rome, Italy between 20 and 26 April 2009.

== Singles entrants ==
=== Seeds ===
Nationality	Player	Ranking*	Seeding
ARG	~~Sergio Roitman~~	~~99~~	~~1~~
UZB	Denis Istomin	100	2
AUT	Daniel Köllerer	103	3
ARG	Brian Dabul	106	4
GER	Simon Greul	113	5
ROU	Victor Crivoi	116	6
CZE	Jiří Vaněk	122	7
FRA	Adrian Mannarino	127	8

- Rankings are as of April 12, 2010.

=== Other entrants ===
The following players received wildcards into the singles main draw:

- (Italy) Daniele Bracciali
- (Italy) Alessio di Mauro
- (Poland) Jerzy Janowicz
- (Italy) Gianluca Naso

The following players received entry from the qualifying draw:

- (Italy) Francesco Aldi
- (Spain) Javier Genaro-Martínez
- (Sweden) Tim Goransson

The following players received lucky loser into the singles main draw:

- (Hungary) Attila Balázs
- (Australia) Robert Smeets
- (Italy) Federico Torresi

== Champions ==
=== Men's singles ===
(Austria) Daniel Köllerer def. (Sweden) Andreas Vinciguerra, 6–3, 6–3.

=== Men's doubles ===
(Germany) Simon Greul / (Germany) Christopher Kas def. (Sweden) Johan Brunström / (Netherlands Antilles) Jean-Julien Rojer, 4–6, 7–6(2), [10–2].
