= 2009 Roma Open – Singles =

Singles
- 2009 Roma Open

Final
- Champion: (Austria) Daniel Köllerer
- Runner-up: (Sweden) Andreas Vinciguerra
- Score: 6–3, 6–3

Events
Singles	Doubles
- Roma Open

Eduardo Schwank was the defender of title; however, he chose not to play.
Daniel Köllerer won in the final 6–3, 6–3, against Andreas Vinciguerra.

== Seeds ==
1. (Argentina) ~~Sergio Roitman~~ (withdrew due to a fever)
2. (Uzbekistan) Denis Istomin (first round)
3. (Austria) Daniel Köllerer (champion)
4. (Argentina) Brian Dabul (first round)
5. (Germany) Simon Greul (second round)
6. (Romania) Victor Crivoi (quarterfinals)
7. (Czech Republic) Jiří Vaněk (quarterfinals)
8. (France) Adrian Mannarino (second round)

== Draw ==
Key

- Q = Qualifier
- WC = Wild card
- LL = Lucky loser
- Alt = Alternate
- ITF = ITF entry
- PR = Protected ranking
- SR = Special ranking
- SE = Special exempt
- JE = Junior exempt
- JR = Junior Accelerator Programme entrant
- CO = College Accelerator Programme entrant
- NG = Next Gen Accelerator Program entrant
- w/o = Walkover
- r = Retired
- d = Defaulted

=== Final four ===
Semifinals
(Italy) Paolo Lorenzi	2	6^{7}
3	(Austria) Daniel Köllerer	6	7
(Sweden) Andreas Vinciguerra	6	3	6
(Italy) Filippo Volandri	2	6	1

Final
(Austria) Daniel Köllerer	6	6
(Sweden) Andreas Vinciguerra	3	3

=== Top half ===
First round
LL	(Italy) F Torresi	1	2
(Serbia) I Bozoljac	6	6
(Italy) T Tenconi	6	6
WC	(Poland) J Janowicz	3	4
WC	(Italy) G Naso	4	4
(Italy) P Lorenzi	6	6
(Netherlands) J Huta Galung	4	3
5	(Germany) S Greul	6	6
3	(Austria) D Köllerer	7	6
Q	(Spain) J Genaro-Martínez	5	4
(France) O Patience	6	6
(Slovenia) G Žemlja	3	3
(Australia) B Klein	0	3
(Germany) S Stadler	6	6
Q	(Italy) F Aldi	0	r
6	(Romania) V Crivoi	5

Second round
(Serbia) I Bozoljac	6	6
(Italy) T Tenconi	3	3
(Italy) P Lorenzi	6	6
5	(Germany) S Greul	4	2
3	(Austria) D Köllerer	6	6
(France) O Patience	3	4
(Germany) S Stadler	2	6	3
6	(Romania) V Crivoi	6	1	6

Quarterfinals
(Serbia) I Bozoljac	3	2
(Italy) P Lorenzi	6	6
3	(Austria) D Köllerer	6	6
6	(Romania) V Crivoi	3	1

Semifinals
(Italy) P Lorenzi	2	6^{7}
3	(Austria) D Köllerer	6	7

=== Bottom half ===
First round
8	(France) A Mannarino	6	7
(Italy) G Petrazzuolo	1	6^{10}
(Sweden) A Vinciguerra	6	6
WC	(Italy) D Bracciali	4	0
(United States) M Russell	6	6
LL	(Australia) R Smeets	4	4
(South Africa) K Anderson	4	7	6
4	(Argentina) B Dabul	6	5	0
7	(Czech Republic) J Vaněk	6	6
(Belgium) R Bemelmans	2	1
WC	(Italy) A di Mauro	6	6
Q	(Sweden) T Göransson	3	1
(Italy) M Crugnola	7	6
LL	(Hungary) A Balázs	5	2
(Italy) F Volandri	6	6
2	(Uzbekistan) D Istomin	2	1

Second round
8	(France) A Mannarino	3	2
(Sweden) A Vinciguerra	6	6
(United States) M Russell	6	7
(South Africa) K Anderson	3	5
7	(Czech Republic) J Vaněk	6	5	6
WC	(Italy) A di Mauro	2	7	4
(Italy) M Crugnola	1	6^{2}
(Italy) F Volandri	6	7

Quarterfinals
(Sweden) A Vinciguerra	6	6
(United States) M Russell	1	1
7	(Czech Republic) J Vaněk	3	5
(Italy) F Volandri	6	7

Semifinals
(Sweden) A Vinciguerra	6	3	6
(Italy) F Volandri	2	6	1
