= 2010 Roma Open =

- Date: April 19 – April 24
- Edition: 9th
- Location: Rome, Italy

Champions

Singles
- (Argentina) Federico del Bonis

Doubles
- (Croatia) Mario Ančić / (Croatia) Ivan Dodig
← 2009 ·	Roma Open	· 2011 →

The 2010 Roma Open was a professional tennis tournament played on outdoor red clay courts. It was part of the 2010 ATP Challenger Tour. It took place in Rome, Italy between 19 and 24 April 2010.

== ATP entrants ==
=== Seeds ===
Nationality	Player	Ranking*	Seeding
GER	Florian Mayer	45	1
GER	Daniel Brands	86	2
AUT	Daniel Köllerer	93	3
ITA	Paolo Lorenzi	101	4
POR	Rui Machado	119	5
POR	Frederico Gil	121	6
ESP	Rubén Ramírez Hidalgo	125	7
JAM	Dustin Brown	126	8

- Rankings are as of April 12, 2010.

=== Other entrants ===
The following players received wildcards into the singles main draw:

- (Germany) Florian Mayer
- (Italy) Alberto Brizzi
- (Croatia) Mario Ančić
- (Italy) Matteo Trevisan

The following players received special exempt into the singles main draw:

- (Netherlands) Jesse Huta Galung

The following players received entry from the qualifying draw:

- (Italy) Daniele Bracciali
- (Italy) Andrea Arnaboldi
- (Austria) Rainer Eitzinger
- (Italy) Alessio di Mauro

The following players received the lucky loser spot:

- (Italy) Francesco Aldi
- (Algeria) Lamine Ouahab
- (Ukraine) Artem Smirnov

== Champions ==
=== Singles ===
(Argentina) Federico del Bonis def. (Germany) Florian Mayer, 6–4, 6–3

=== Doubles ===
(Croatia) Mario Ančić / (Croatia) Ivan Dodig def. (Argentina) Juan Pablo Brzezicki / (Spain) Rubén Ramírez Hidalgo, 4–6, 7–6(8), [10–4]
