= 2012 Roma Open =

- Date: 7–12 May
- Edition: 11th
- Surface: Clay
- Location: Rome, Italy

Champions

Singles
- (Poland) Jerzy Janowicz

Doubles
- (United Kingdom) Jamie Delgado / (United Kingdom) Ken Skupski
← 2011 ·	Roma Open	· 2013 →

The 2012 Roma Open was a professional tennis tournament played on clay courts. It was the eleventh edition of the tournament which was part of the 2012 ATP Challenger Tour. It took place in Rome, Italy between 7 and 12 May 2012.

== Singles main draw entrants ==
=== Seeds ===
Country	Player	Rank^{1}	Seed
LUX	Gilles Müller	62	1
LAT	Ernests Gulbis	84	2
POR	Rui Machado	90	3
ITA	Simone Bolelli	98	4
CRO	Antonio Veić	127	5
GBR	James Ward	137	6
FRA	Guillaume Rufin	154	7
RUS	Andrey Kuznetsov	157	8

- ^{1} Rankings are as of April 30, 2012.

=== Other entrants ===
The following players received wildcards into the singles main draw:

- (Italy) Alberto Brizzi
- (Italy) Marco Cecchinato
- (Italy) Thomas Fabbiano
- (Italy) Gianluigi Quinzi

The following players received entry as a special exempt into the singles main draw:

- (Slovakia) Andrej Martin

The following players received entry from the qualifying draw:

- (Switzerland) Henri Laaksonen
- (Serbia) Boris Pašanski
- (Italy) Walter Trusendi
- (United States) Rhyne Williams

== Champions ==
=== Singles ===
- (Poland) Jerzy Janowicz def. (Luxembourg) Gilles Müller, 7–6^{(7–3)}, 6–3

=== Doubles ===
- (United Kingdom) Jamie Delgado / (United Kingdom) Ken Skupski def. (Spain) Adrián Menéndez / (Italy) Walter Trusendi, 6–1, 6–4
