= 2011 Roma Open =

- Date: 2–8 May
- Edition: 10th
- Location: Rome, Italy

Champions

Singles
- (Italy) Simone Bolelli

Doubles
- (Colombia) Juan Sebastián Cabal / (Colombia) Robert Farah
← 2010 ·	Roma Open	· 2012 →

The 2011 Roma Open was a professional tennis tournament played on clay courts. It was the tenth edition of the tournament which was part of the 2011 ATP Challenger Tour. It took place in Rome, Italy between 2 and 8 May 2011.

== ATP entrants ==
=== Seeds ===
Country	Player	Rank^{1}	Seed
GER	Tobias Kamke	78	1
GER	Julian Reister	94	2
GER	Mischa Zverev	99	3
GER	Andreas Beck	110	4
FRA	Benoît Paire	112	5
GER	Björn Phau	115	6
NED	Thomas Schoorel	117	7
LUX	Gilles Müller	119	8

- Rankings are as of April 25, 2011.

=== Other entrants ===
The following players received wildcards into the singles main draw:

- (Italy) Simone Bolelli
- (Chile) Nicolás Massú
- (Italy) Matteo Trevisan
- (Italy) Simone Vagnozzi

The following players received entry from the qualifying draw:

- (Italy) Andrea Arnaboldi
- (Spain) Pablo Carreño Busta
- (Colombia) Juan Sebastián Cabal
- (Colombia) Carlos Salamanca

== Champions ==
=== Singles ===
(Italy) Simone Bolelli def. (Argentina) Eduardo Schwank, 2–6, 6–1, 6–3

=== Doubles ===
(Colombia) Juan Sebastián Cabal / (Colombia) Robert Farah def. (Mexico) Santiago González / (United States) Travis Rettenmaier, 2–6, 6–3, [11–9]
