= 2019 Garden Open =

- Date: 6–12 May
- Edition: 11th
- Draw: 48S / 16D
- Surface: Clay
- Location: Rome, Italy

Champions

Singles
- (Switzerland) Henri Laaksonen

Doubles
- (Austria) Philipp Oswald / (Slovakia) Filip Polášek
| ← 2018 · | Garden Open | · 2021 → |

The 2019 Garden Open was a professional tennis tournament played on clay courts. It was the eleventh edition of the tournament which was part of the 2019 ATP Challenger Tour. It took place in Rome, Italy between 6 and 12 May 2019.

== Singles main-draw entrants ==
=== Seeds ===
| Country | Player | Rank^{1} | Seed |
|---|---|---|---|
| GER | Maximilian Marterer | 100 | 1 |
| ITA | Paolo Lorenzi | 108 | 2 |
| ~~USA~~ | ~~Ryan Harrison~~ | ~~109~~ | ~~3~~ |
| SUI | Henri Laaksonen | 119 | 4 |
| POL | Kamil Majchrzak | 129 | 5 |
| SVK | Jozef Kovalík | 137 | 6 |
| GER | Oscar Otte | 138 | 7 |
| ITA | Salvatore Caruso | 152 | 8 |
| SVK | Filip Horanský | 186 | 9 |
| ITA | Stefano Napolitano | 188 | 10 |
| ITA | Roberto Marcora | 191 | 11 |
| CRO | Viktor Galović | 196 | 12 |
| ITA | Federico Gaio | 202 | 13 |
| CZE | Adam Pavlásek | 204 | 14 |
| HUN | Attila Balázs | 219 | 15 |
| ITA | Matteo Viola | 232 | 16 |
| ITA | Gian Marco Moroni | 250 | 17 |

- ^{1} Rankings as of 29 April 2019.

=== Other entrants ===
The following players received wildcards into the singles main draw:

- (United States) ~~Ryan Harrison~~
- (Italy) Federico Iannaccone
- (Italy) Emiliano Maggioli
- (Italy) Julian Ocleppo
- (Italy) Francesco Passaro

The following player received entry into the singles main draw as an alternate:

- (Germany) Peter Torebko

The following players received entry into the singles main draw using their ITF World Tennis Ranking:

- (Italy) Riccardo Bonadio
- (Argentina) Hernán Casanova
- (Germany) Peter Heller
- (France) Grégoire Jacq
- (Tunisia) Skander Mansouri

The following players received entry from the qualifying draw:

- (Switzerland) Luca Margaroli
- (Italy) Nicolò Turchetti

== Champions ==
=== Singles ===
- (Switzerland) Henri Laaksonen def. (Italy) Gian Marco Moroni 6–7^{(2–7)}, 7–6^{(7–2)}, 6–2.

=== Doubles ===
- (Austria) Philipp Oswald / (Slovakia) Filip Polášek def. (Serbia) Nikola Čačić / (Czech Republic) Adam Pavlásek Walkover.
