= 2023 Garden Open – Singles =

Singles
- 2023 Garden Open

Final
- Champion: (India) Sumit Nagal
- Runner-up: (Netherlands) Jesper de Jong
- Score: 6–3, 6–2

Events
Singles	Doubles
- Garden Open

Franco Agamenone was the defending champion but lost in the quarterfinals to Jesper de Jong.

Sumit Nagal won the title after defeating de Jong 6–3, 6–2 in the final.

== Seeds ==
1. (Hungary) Fábián Marozsán (first round)
2. (Italy) Franco Agamenone (quarterfinals)
3. (Italy) Mattia Bellucci (first round)
4. (Italy) Francesco Maestrelli (first round)
5. (Netherlands) Jelle Sels (second round)
6. (Italy) Andrea Pellegrino (withdrew)
7. (Austria) Maximilian Neuchrist (first round)
8. (Belgium) Joris De Loore (semifinals)

== Draw ==
Key

- Q = Qualifier
- WC = Wild card
- LL = Lucky loser
- Alt = Alternate
- ITF = ITF entry
- PR = Protected ranking
- SR = Special ranking
- SE = Special exempt
- JE = Junior exempt
- JR = Junior Accelerator Programme entrant
- CO = College Accelerator Programme entrant
- NG = Next Gen Accelerator Program entrant
- w/o = Walkover
- r = Retired
- d = Defaulted

=== Finals ===
Semifinals
8	(Belgium) Joris De Loore	6	5	4
Q	(India) Sumit Nagal	2	7	6
(Italy) Flavio Cobolli	5	3
(Netherlands) Jesper de Jong	7	6

Final
Q	(India) Sumit Nagal	6	6
(Netherlands) Jesper de Jong	3	2

=== Top half ===
First round
1	(Hungary) F Marozsán	4	4
Q	(Italy) Alexander Weis	6	6
(Switzerland) A Ritschard	7^{7}	7
Alt	(Croatia) N Serdarušić	6^{3}	5
(Bosnia and Herzegovina) N Fatić	0^{r}
WC	(Italy) G Piraino	5
(Belgium) M Geerts	2	2
8	(Belgium) J De Loore	6	6
4	(Italy) F Maestrelli	2	4
Q	(India) S Nagal	6	6
(Bulgaria) A Andreev	0^{r}
WC	(Italy) Fausto Tabacco	3
Alt	(Netherlands) M Houkes	4	6	6
Q	(Monaco) V Vacherot	6	3	4
Alt	(Romania) FC Jianu	5	3
5	(Netherlands) J Sels	7	6

Second round
Q	(Italy) A Weis	5	2
(Switzerland) A Ritschard	7	6
WC	(Italy) G Piraino	7^{8}	1	4
8	(Belgium) J De Loore	6^{6}	6	6
Q	(India) S Nagal	6	6
WC	(Italy) F Tabacco	3	0
Alt	(Netherlands) M Houkes	6	7^{7}
5	(Netherlands) J Sels	4	6^{5}

Quarterfinals
(Switzerland) A Ritschard	7	1	4
8	(Belgium) J De Loore	5	6	6
Q	(India) S Nagal	7	6
Alt	(Netherlands) M Houkes	5	0

Semifinals
8	(Belgium) J De Loore	6	5	4
Q	(India) S Nagal	2	7	6

=== Bottom half ===
First round
LL	(Norway) V Durasovic	3	3
Q	(Italy) F Forti	6	6
(Italy) F Cobolli	7^{12}	4	7^{7}
(United States) N Moreno de Alboran	6^{10}	6	6^{1}
WC	(Italy) F Arnaboldi	4	3
(Argentina) M Trungelliti	6	6
Q	(Italy) G Fonio	6	6
3	(Italy) M Bellucci	3	4
7	(Austria) M Neuchrist	6^{4}	4
(Italy) G Mager	7^{7}	6
(Netherlands) J de Jong	6	6
(Czech Republic) M Gengel	3	2
(Spain) O Roca Batalla	6	6
LL	(Spain) M Damas	1	1
Q	(Italy) S Caruso	3	4
2	(Italy) F Agamenone	6	6

Second round
Q	(Italy) F Forti	5	1
(Italy) F Cobolli	7	6
(Argentina) M Trungelliti	2	6	6
Q	(Italy) G Fonio	6	1	2
(Italy) G Mager	0	3
(Netherlands) J de Jong	6	6
(Spain) O Roca Batalla	5	3
2	(Italy) F Agamenone	7	6

Quarterfinals
(Italy) F Cobolli	7	7
(Argentina) M Trungelliti	5	5
(Netherlands) J de Jong	6	6
2	(Italy) F Agamenone	3	4

Semifinals
(Italy) F Cobolli	5	3
(Netherlands) J de Jong	7	6
