= 2016 Garden Open =

- Date: 2–7 May
- Edition: 8th
- Draw: 32S / 15D
- Prize money: €42,500+H
- Surface: Clay
- Location: Rome, Italy

Champions

Singles
- (United Kingdom) Kyle Edmund

Doubles
- (China) Bai Yan / (China) Li Zhe
← 2015 ·	Garden Open	· 2017 →

The 2016 Garden Open was a professional tennis tournament played on clay courts. It was the eighth edition of the tournament which was part of the 2016 ATP Challenger Tour. It took place in Rome, Italy between 2 and 7 May 2016.

== Singles main-draw entrants ==
=== Seeds ===
Country	Player	Rank^{1}	Seed
CZE	Jiří Veselý	63	1
GBR	Kyle Edmund	89	2
ARG	Horacio Zeballos	91	3
CZE	Adam Pavlásek	109	4
SRB	Filip Krajinović	110	5
AUS	Jordan Thompson	118	6
FRA	Kenny de Schepper	148	7
FRA	Vincent Millot	149	8

- ^{1} Rankings as of April 25, 2016.

=== Other entrants ===
The following players received wildcards into the singles main draw:

- (Italy) Federico Bonacia
- (Italy) Flavio Cipolla
- (Italy) Andrea Pellegrino
- (Italy) Gianluca Naso

The following players received entry into the singles main draw: as a special exempt:

- (Italy) Stefano Napolitano

The following players received entry into the main draw with a protected ranking:

- (Germany) Julian Reister

The following players received entry from the qualifying draw:

- (Portugal) Frederico Ferreira Silva
- (Russia) Ivan Nedelko
- (India) Sumit Nagal
- (Hungary) Márton Fucsovics

The following players entered the main draw as lucky losers:

- (Germany) Kevin Krawietz
- (Japan) Yasutaka Uchiyama

== Champions ==
=== Singles ===
- (United Kingdom) Kyle Edmund def. (Serbia) Filip Krajinović, 7–6^{(7–2)}, 6–0

=== Doubles ===
- (China) Bai Yan / (China) Li Zhe def. (Netherlands) Sander Arends / (Austria) Tristan-Samuel Weissborn, 6–3, 3–6, [11–9]
