= 2017 Garden Open – Singles =

Singles
- 2017 Garden Open

Final
- Champion: (Italy) Marco Cecchinato
- Runner-up: (Slovakia) Jozef Kovalík
- Score: 6–4, 6–4

Events
Singles	Doubles
- Garden Open

Kyle Edmund was the defending champion but chose not to defend his title.

Marco Cecchinato won the title after defeating Jozef Kovalík 6–4, 6–4 in the final.

== Seeds ==
1. (Czech Republic) Jiří Veselý (second round)
2. (Argentina) Nicolás Kicker (first round)
3. (Czech Republic) Adam Pavlásek (second round)
4. (Portugal) Gastão Elias (first round)
5. (Slovakia) Andrej Martin (second round)
6. (Germany) Maximilian Marterer (second round)
7. (Germany) Tobias Kamke (first round)
8. (Kazakhstan) Alexander Bublik (second round)

== Draw ==
Key

- Q = Qualifier
- WC = Wild card
- LL = Lucky loser
- Alt = Alternate
- ITF = ITF entry
- PR = Protected ranking
- SR = Special ranking
- SE = Special exempt
- JE = Junior exempt
- JR = Junior Accelerator Programme entrant
- CO = College Accelerator Programme entrant
- NG = Next Gen Accelerator Program entrant
- w/o = Walkover
- r = Retired
- d = Defaulted

=== Finals ===
Semifinals
(Slovakia) Jozef Kovalík	4	6	6
(Belgium) Kimmer Coppejans	6	2	3
Q	(Germany) Yannick Maden	2	6^{5}
(Italy) Marco Cecchinato	6	7^{7}

Final
(Slovakia) Jozef Kovalík	4	4
(Italy) Marco Cecchinato	6	6

=== Top half ===
First round
1	(Czech Republic) J Veselý	3	6	6
WC	(Italy) M Donati	6	3	3
WC	(Greece) S Tsitsipas	6	6
Alt	(Argentina) A Velotti	3	0
(Czech Republic) J Šátral	4	0
(Slovakia) J Kovalík	6	6
(Italy) L Giustino	6	6
7	(Germany) T Kamke	3	1
3	(Czech Republic) A Pavlásek	3	7^{7}	6
Q	(Germany) O Otte	6	6^{5}	3
(Australia) S Groth	0	5
(Belgium) K Coppejans	6	7
WC	(Italy) R Bellotti	6	6
Q	(Poland) Maciej Rajski	3	4
(Hungary) M Fucsovics	3	6	3
8	(Kazakhstan) A Bublik	6	1	6

Second round
1	(Czech Republic) J Veselý	4	6	6^{3}
WC	(Greece) S Tsitsipas	6	4	7^{7}
(Slovakia) J Kovalík	6	6
(Italy) L Giustino	2	4
3	(Czech Republic) A Pavlásek	2	6^{3}
(Belgium) K Coppejans	6	7^{7}
WC	(Italy) R Bellotti	6	7^{7}
8	(Kazakhstan) A Bublik	3	6^{3}

Quarterfinals
WC	(Greece) S Tsitsipas	6	4	3
(Slovakia) J Kovalík	2	6	6
(Belgium) K Coppejans	6	2	7
WC	(Italy) R Bellotti	2	6	5

Semifinals
(Slovakia) J Kovalík	4	6	6
(Belgium) K Coppejans	6	2	3

=== Bottom half ===
First round
5	(Slovakia) A Martin	7^{7}	6
(Belarus) U Ignatik	6^{3}	1
Q	(Germany) Y Maden	6	6
(Spain) R Ramírez Hidalgo	2	1
(Canada) S Diez	3	5
(Argentina) M Trungelliti	6	7
SE	(Italy) S Travaglia	6	6
4	(Portugal) G Elias	2	0
6	(Germany) M Marterer	6	7
(United States) M Mmoh	3	5
WC	(Italy) G Quinzi	6	6
(France) T Lamasine	1	1
Q	(China) D Wu	2	6	1
(Chile) N Jarry	6	3	6
(Italy) M Cecchinato	6	6
2	(Argentina) N Kicker	3	4

Second round
5	(Slovakia) A Martin	4	6^{5}
Q	(Germany) Y Maden	6	7^{7}
(Argentina) M Trungelliti	6^{1}	7	6^{6}
SE	(Italy) S Travaglia	7^{7}	5	7^{8}
6	(Germany) M Marterer	5	1
WC	(Italy) G Quinzi	7	6
(Chile) N Jarry	6^{5}	4
(Italy) M Cecchinato	7^{7}	6

Quarterfinals
Q	(Germany) Y Maden	7^{7}	6
SE	(Italy) S Travaglia	6^{2}	1
WC	(Italy) G Quinzi	3	3
(Italy) M Cecchinato	6	6

Semifinals
Q	(Germany) Y Maden	2	6^{5}
(Italy) M Cecchinato	6	7^{7}
