= 2023 Garden Open =

- Date: 24 – 30 April
- Edition: 15th
- Surface: Clay
- Location: Rome, Italy

Champions

Singles
- (India) Sumit Nagal

Doubles
- (Colombia) Nicolás Barrientos / (Portugal) Francisco Cabral
- Garden Open

The 2023 Garden Open was a professional tennis tournament played on clay courts. It was the 15th edition of the tournament which was part of the 2023 ATP Challenger Tour. It took place in Rome, Italy between 24 and 30 April 2023.

== Singles main-draw entrants ==
=== Seeds ===
Country	Player	Rank^{1}	Seed
HUN	Fábián Marozsán	133	1
ITA	Franco Agamenone	147	2
ITA	Mattia Bellucci	151	3
ITA	Francesco Maestrelli	168	4
NED	Jelle Sels	169	5
~~ITA~~	~~Andrea Pellegrino~~	~~173~~	~~6~~
AUT	Maximilian Neuchrist	182	7
BEL	Joris De Loore	196	8

- ^{1} Rankings as of 17 April 2023.

=== Other entrants ===
The following players received wildcards into the singles main draw:

- (Italy) Federico Arnaboldi
- (Italy) Gabriele Piraino
- (Italy) Fausto Tabacco

The following players received entry into the singles main draw as alternates:

- (Netherlands) Max Houkes
- (Romania) Filip Cristian Jianu
- (Croatia) Nino Serdarušić

The following players received entry from the qualifying draw:

- (Italy) Salvatore Caruso
- (Italy) Giovanni Fonio
- (Italy) Francesco Forti
- (India) Sumit Nagal
- (Monaco) Valentin Vacherot
- (Italy) Alexander Weis

The following players received entry as lucky losers:

- (Spain) Miguel Damas
- (Norway) Viktor Durasovic

== Champions ==
=== Singles ===
- (India) Sumit Nagal def. (Netherlands) Jesper de Jong 6–3, 6–2.

=== Doubles ===
- (Colombia) Nicolás Barrientos / (Portugal) Francisco Cabral def. (Kazakhstan) Andrey Golubev / (Ukraine) Denys Molchanov 6–3, 6–1.
