= Andreas Mies =

German tennis player

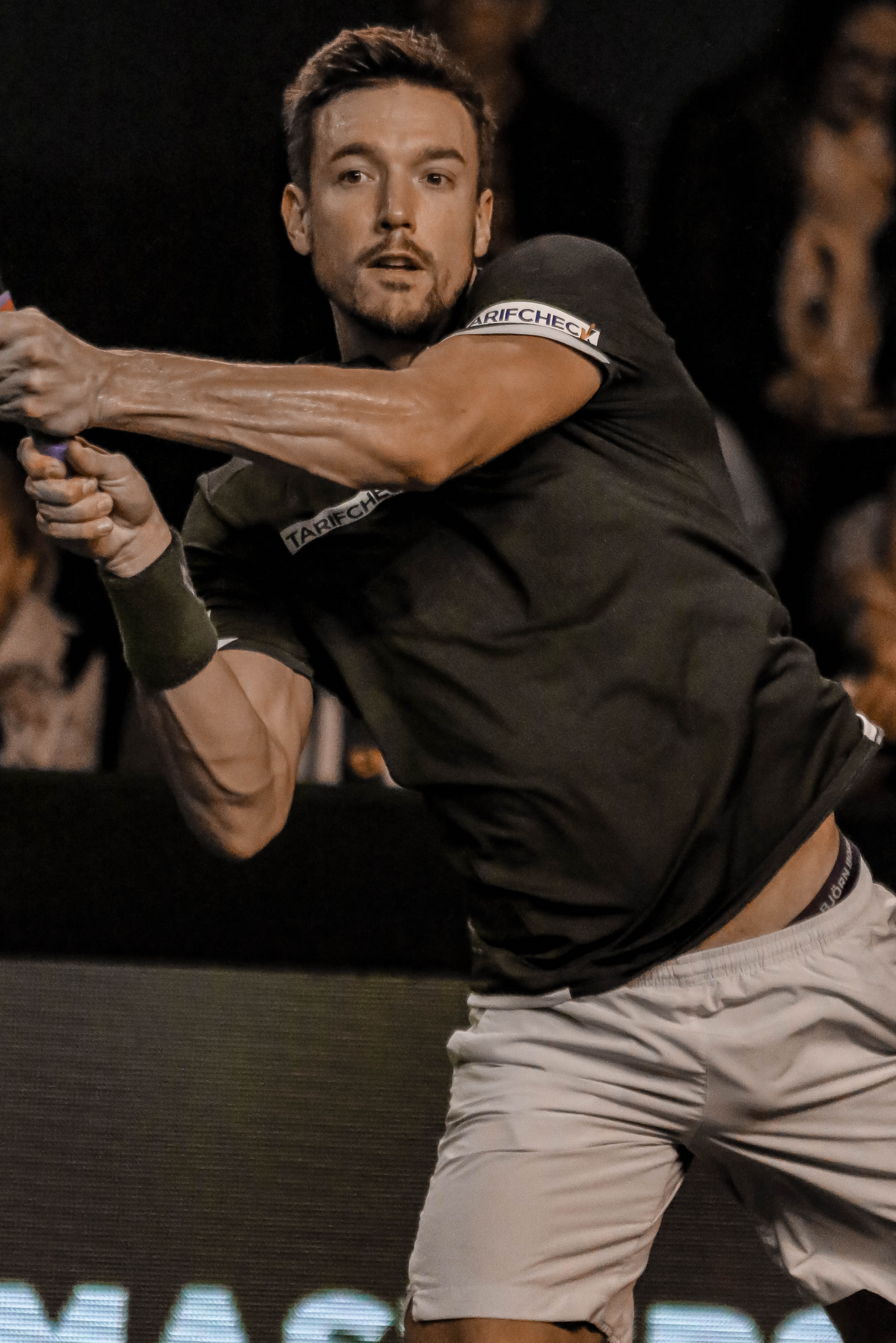
- Mies in 2019
- Country (sports): Germany
- Born: 21 August 1990 (age 36) Cologne, West Germany
- Height: 1.88 m (6 ft 2 in)
- Turned pro: 2013
- Retired: 2025
- Plays: Right-handed (two-handed backhand)
- Coach: Dirk Hortian
- Prize money: US $2,273,768

Singles
- Career record: 0–0
- Highest ranking: No. 781 (14 July 2014)

Doubles
- Career record: 154–132
- Career titles: 7
- Highest ranking: No. 8 (4 November 2019)

Grand Slam doubles results
- Australian Open: QF (2023)
- French Open: W (2019, 2020)
- Wimbledon: QF (2022)
- US Open: SF (2019)

Other doubles tournaments
- Tour Finals: RR (2019, 2020)

Grand Slam mixed doubles results
- Australian Open: 1R (2020)
- Wimbledon: 1R (2019, 2022)
- US Open: 1R (2019, 2022, 2023)

Team competitions
- Davis Cup: QF (2019)

Andreas Mies (German pronunciation: [anˈdʁeːas ˈmiːs]; born 21 August 1990) is a German former professional tennis player who specializes in doubles. He has a career-high ATP doubles ranking of No. 8 achieved on 4 November 2019 and a singles ranking of No. 781 achieved on 14 July 2014.

He is a two-time Grand Slam champion, having won the French Open doubles title in both 2019 and 2020 alongside compatriot Kevin Krawietz. The pair also reached the semifinals at the 2019 US Open and qualified for the 2019 and 2020 ATP Finals. Mies has won an additional five doubles titles on the ATP Tour. He played college tennis for the Auburn Tigers, and represented Germany in the Davis Cup since 2019.

== Professional career ==
=== 2017: First ATP Challenger title ===
Mies won his first ATP Challenger Tour doubles title at the Garden Open in Rome, partnering Oscar Otte.

=== 2018: New partnership with Krawietz ===
Mies made his ATP World Tour and Grand Slam debut at the Wimbledon Championships in doubles with partner Kevin Krawietz as a qualifier, where they lost in the third round to the eventual champions Mike Bryan and Jack Sock despite having two match points.

=== 2019: Historic French Open doubles title, ATP Finals debut ===
Mies won his first doubles title on the ATP Tour at the New York Open, again with Krawietz.

He and Krawietz won sensationally the French Open doubles title as unseeded players, defeating the French duo Jérémy Chardy and Fabrice Martin in the final. This victory made them the first all-German team in the Open Era to win a Grand Slam title, and the first since Gottfried von Cramm and Henner Henkel in 1937.

At the US Open, he and Krawietz reached the semifinals. They won their third title at the European Open in Antwerp.

Mies made his debut at the ATP Finals with his partner Kevin Krawietz.

=== 2020-21: Second French Open doubles title, injury hiatus ===
Mies and Krawietz successfully defended their French Open title, defeating Mate Pavić and Bruno Soares in the final in straight sets. Having won the title twice, they had not lost a match at the French Open together.

Mies was sidelined for the a considerable part of the 2021 season as a result of a knee injury.

=== 2022: Reunion with Krawietz, one more ATP 500 title, second home final ===
At the Barcelona Open, he won the title with Krawietz. At the French Open, Mies finally lost his first doubles match at the tournament when he and Krawietz suffered an upset loss in the first round.

=== 2023-24: New partnerships, third French Open semifinal ===
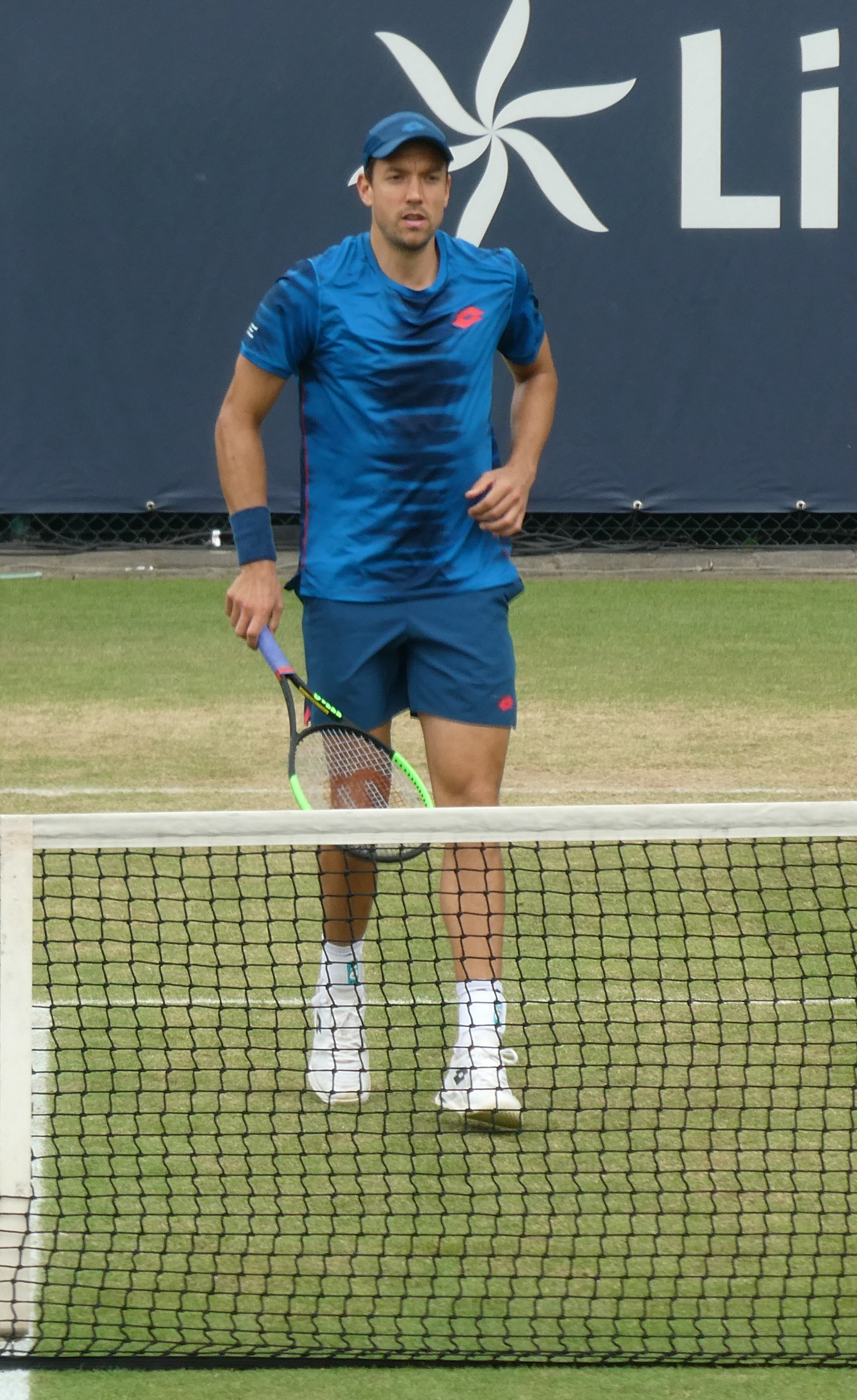
Mies at the 2024 Libéma Open

Mies and John Peers reached the quarterfinals of the 2023 Australian Open. With Fabrice Martin he reached the semifinals of the Monte-Carlo Masters. With Matwé Middelkoop he reached the semifinals of the 2023 French Open for the third time.

Seeded 12th with Neal Skupski at the 2024 French Open, they lost in the first round to eventual quarterfinalists, the Czech/Chinese pair of Tomáš Macháč/Zhizhen Zhang.

Partnering Alexander Erler, Mies won the doubles title at the 2024 Generali Open Kitzbühel, defeating Constantin Frantzen and Hendrik Jebens in the final.

== Doubles performance timeline ==
Key
W	F	SF	QF	#R	RR	Q#	DNQ	A	NH

(W) winner; (F) finalist; (SF) semifinalist; (QF) quarterfinalist; (#R) rounds 4, 3, 2, 1; (RR) round-robin stage; (Q#) qualification round; (DNQ) did not qualify; (A) absent; (NH) not held; (SR) strike rate (events won / competed); (W–L) win–loss record.
To avoid confusion and double counting, these charts are updated at the conclusion of a tournament or when the player's participation has ended.

Current through the 2025 ATP Tour.

Tournament	2018	2019	2020	2021	2022	2023	2024	2025	2026	SR	W–L	Win %
Grand Slam tournaments
Australian Open	A	2R	1R	A	3R	QF	2R	1R	A	0 / 6	7–6	54%
French Open	A	W	W	A	1R	SF	1R	1R	A	2 / 6	16–4	80%
Wimbledon	3R	1R	NH	A	QF	2R	3R	A		0 / 5	8–5	62%
US Open	A	SF	2R	3R	2R	3R	2R	A		0 / 6	11–6	65%
Win–loss	2–1	11–3	7–2	2–1	6–4	10–4	4–4	0–2	0–0	2 / 23	42–21	67%
Year-end championship
ATP Finals	DNQ	RR	RR	did not qualify						0 / 2	2–4	33%
National representation
Davis Cup	A	QF	QR	A	A	QR	A	A		0 / 1	4–0	100%
ATP 1000 tournaments
Indian Wells Open	A	A	NH	1R	1R	A	1R	A	A	0 / 3	0–3	0%
Miami Open	A	A	NH	A	1R	1R	1R	A	A	0 / 3	0–3	0%
Monte-Carlo Masters	A	A	NH	A	1R	SF	A	A	A	0 / 2	3–2	60%
Madrid Open	A	A	NH	A	QF	2R	1R	A	A	0 / 3	2–3	40%
Italian Open	A	A	1R	A	QF	1R	A	A	A	0 / 3	2–3	40%
Canadian Open	A	2R	NH	2R	SF	2R	A	A		0 / 4	6–4	60%
Cincinnati Open	A	1R	QF	1R	QF	1R	A	A		0 / 5	4–5	44%
Shanghai Masters	A	1R	not held			1R	A	A		0 / 2	0–2	0%
Paris Masters	A	SF	A	QF	SF	1R	A	A		0 / 4	8–4	67%
Win–loss	0–0	4–4	2–2	3–4	11–8	5–8	0–3	0–0	0–0	0 / 29	25–29	46%
Career statistics
	2018	2019	2020	2021	2022	2023	2024	2025	2026	Career		
Tournaments	4	26	13	9	28	25	22	9	0	136		
Titles	0	3	1	0	2	0	1	0	0	7		
Finals	0	3	2	0	2	0	2	0	0	9		
Overall win–loss	4–4	34–24	20–15	7–9	41–25	26–25	22–21	0–9	0–0	154–132		
Win %	50%	59%	57%	44%	62%	51%	51%	0%	–	54%		
Year-end ranking (Note: Year-end ranking 2013: 527, 2014: 506, 2015: 1551, 2016: 181, 2017: 131)	73	11	20	49	24	33	61	274				

== Grand Slam finals ==
=== Doubles: 2 (2 titles) ===
Result	Year	Championship	Surface	Partner	Opponents	Score
Win	2019	French Open	Clay	(Germany) Kevin Krawietz	(France) Jérémy Chardy (France) Fabrice Martin	6–2, 7–6^{(7–3)}
Win	2020	French Open (2)	Clay	(Germany) Kevin Krawietz	(Croatia) Mate Pavić (Brazil) Bruno Soares	6–3, 7–5

== ATP career finals ==
=== Doubles: 9 (7 titles, 2 runner-ups) ===
Legend Grand Slam (2–0) ATP Finals (0–0) ATP 1000 (0–0) ATP 500 (1–0) ATP 250 (4–2)	Finals by surface Hard (2–1) Clay (5–1) Grass (0–0)

Result	W–L	Date	Tournament	Tier	Surface	Partner	Opponents	Score
Win	1–0	Feb 2019	New York Open, United States	ATP 250	Hard (i)	(Germany) Kevin Krawietz	(Mexico) Santiago González (Pakistan) Aisam-ul-Haq Qureshi	6–4, 7–5
Win	2–0	Jun 2019	French Open, France	Grand Slam	Clay	(Germany) Kevin Krawietz	(France) Jérémy Chardy (France) Fabrice Martin	6–2, 7–6^{(7–3)}
Win	3–0	Oct 2019	European Open, Belgium	ATP 250	Hard (i)	(Germany) Kevin Krawietz	(United States) Rajeev Ram (United Kingdom) Joe Salisbury	7–6^{(7–1)}, 6–3
Win	4–0	Oct 2020	French Open, France (2)	Grand Slam	Clay	(Germany) Kevin Krawietz	(Croatia) Mate Pavić (Brazil) Bruno Soares	6–3, 7–5
Loss	4–1	Oct 2020	Cologne Championship, Germany	ATP 250	Hard (i)	(Germany) Kevin Krawietz	(South Africa) Raven Klaasen (Japan) Ben McLachlan	2–6, 4–6
Win	5–1	Apr 2022	Barcelona Open, Spain	ATP 500	Clay	(Germany) Kevin Krawietz	(Netherlands) Wesley Koolhof (United Kingdom) Neal Skupski	6–7^{(3–7)}, 7–6^{(7–5)}, [10–6]
Win	6–1	May 2022	Bavarian Championships, Germany	ATP 250	Clay	(Germany) Kevin Krawietz	(Brazil) Rafael Matos (Spain) David Vega Hernández	4–6, 6–4, [10–7]
Loss	6–2	Apr 2024	Bavarian Championships, Germany	ATP 250	Clay	(Germany) Jan-Lennard Struff	(India) Yuki Bhambri (France) Albano Olivetti	6–7^{(6–8)}, 6–7^{(5–7)}
Win	7–2	Jul 2024	Austrian Open Kitzbühel, Austria	ATP 250	Clay	(Austria) Alexander Erler	(Germany) Constantin Frantzen (Germany) Hendrik Jebens	6–3, 3–6, [10–6]

== ATP Challenger finals ==
=== Doubles: 17 (11–6) ===
Finals by surface
Hard (0–0)
Clay (10–5)
Grass (0–1)
Carpet (1–0)

Result	W–L	Date	Tournament	Surface	Partner	Opponents	Score
Loss	0–1	Jul 2016	Tampere, Finland	Clay	(Australia) Steven de Waard	(Spain) David Pérez Sanz (United States) Max Schnur	4–6, 4–6
Loss	0–2	Apr 2017	Qingdao, China	Clay	(Germany) Oscar Otte	(Germany) Gero Kretschmer (Germany) Alexander Satschko	6–2, 6–7^{(6–8)}, [3–10]
Win	1–2	May 2017	Rome, Italy	Clay	(Germany) Oscar Otte	(Belgium) Kimmer Coppejans (Hungary) Márton Fucsovics	4–6, 7–6^{(14–12)}, [10–8]
Win	2–2	Jun 2017	Poprad-Tatry, Slovakia	Clay	(Poland) Mateusz Kowalczyk	(Switzerland) Luca Margaroli (Austria) Sam Weissborn	6–3, 7–6^{(7–3)}
Loss	2–3	Jul 2017	Prague, Czech Republic	Clay	(Germany) Gero Kretschmer	(Czech Republic) Jan Šátral (Austria) Sam Weissborn	3–6, 7–5, [3–10]
Win	3–3	Aug 2017	Meerbusch, Germany	Clay	(Germany) Kevin Krawietz	(Germany) Dustin Brown (Croatia) Antonio Šančić	6–1, 7–6^{(7–5)}
Win	4–3	May 2018	Rome, Italy	Clay	(Germany) Kevin Krawietz	(Belgium) Sander Gillé (Belgium) Joran Vliegen	6–3, 2–6, [10–4]
Loss	4–4	May 2018	Heilbronn, Germany	Clay	(Germany) Kevin Krawietz	(Australia) Rameez Junaid (Netherlands) David Pel	2–6, 6–2, [7–10]
Win	5–4	Jun 2018	Almaty, Kazakhstan	Clay	(Germany) Kevin Krawietz	(Lithuania) Laurynas Grigelis (Ukraine) Vladyslav Manafov	6–2, 7–6^{(7–2)}
Loss	5–5	Jun 2018	Ilkley, United Kingdom	Grass	(Germany) Kevin Krawietz	(United States) Austin Krajicek (India) Jeevan Nedunchezhiyan	3–6, 3–6
Win	6–5	Sep 2018	Genoa, Italy	Clay	(Germany) Kevin Krawietz	(Slovakia) Martin Kližan (Slovakia) Filip Polášek	6–2, 3–6, [10–2]
Win	7–5	Sep 2018	Sibiu, Romania	Clay	(Germany) Kevin Krawietz	(Poland) Tomasz Bednarek (Netherlands) David Pel	6–4, 6–2
Win	8–5	Nov 2018	Eckental, Germany	Carpet (i)	(Germany) Kevin Krawietz	(France) Hugo Nys (United Kingdom) Jonny O'Mara	6–1, 6–4
Win	9–5	Mar 2019	Marbella, Spain	Clay	(Germany) Kevin Krawietz	(Belgium) Sander Gillé (Belgium) Joran Vliegen	7–6^{(8–6)}, 2–6, [10–6]
Win	10–5	May 2019	Heilbronn, Germany	Clay	(Germany) Kevin Krawietz	(France) Fabrice Martin (Germany) Andre Begemann	6–2, 6–4
Loss	10–6	May 2024	Turin, Italy	Clay	(United Kingdom) Neal Skupski	(Finland) Harri Heliövaara (United Kingdom) Henry Patten	3–6, 3–6
Win	11–6	May 2025	Oeiras, Portugal	Clay	(Spain) David Vega Hernández	(Brazil) Marcelo Demoliner (Austria) David Pichler	6–4, 6–4

== ITF Futures finals ==
=== Doubles: 24 (18–6) ===
Finals by surface
Hard (4–3)
Clay (9–2)
Carpet (5–1)

Result	W–L	Date	Tournament	Surface	Partner	Opponents	Score
Win	1–0	Jul 2013	Germany F11, Dortmund	Clay	(Germany) Oscar Otte	(Germany) Mats Moraing (Germany) Tom Schönenberg	7–5, 6–1
Win	2–0	Sep 2013	France F17, Forbach	Carpet (i)	(Germany) Oscar Otte	(Germany) Tim Pütz (Germany) Lukas Storck	6–7^{(7–9)}, 6–2, [10–7]
Win	3–0	Oct 2013	Germany F17, Hambach	Carpet (i)	(Germany) Oscar Otte	(Austria) Nikolaus Moser (United Kingdom) Neil Pauffley	7–5, 4–4 ret.
Win	4–0	Oct 2013	Germany F19, Essen	Hard (i)	(Germany) Oscar Otte	(Serbia) Miki Janković (India) Sriram Balaji	w/o
Win	5–0	Oct 2013	Germany F20, Bad Salzdetfurth	Carpet (i)	(Germany) Oscar Otte	(Germany) Daniel Masur (Germany) Dominik Schulz	5–7, 6–3, [10–8]
Loss	5–1	Nov 2013	Greece F19, Heraklion	Hard	(Germany) Oscar Otte	(United Kingdom) Luke Bambridge (United Kingdom) Oliver Golding	3–6, 5–7
Loss	5–2	Apr 2014	Turkey F10, Antalya	Hard	(United Kingdom) George Coupland	(Slovakia) Karol Beck (Austria) Maximilian Neuchrist	2–6, 3–6
Win	6–2	May 2014	Romania F2, Bucharest	Clay	(Germany) Demian Raab	(Romania) Nicolae Frunză (Romania) Petru-Alexandru Luncanu	7–5, 5–7, [10–7]
Loss	6–3	Jun 2014	Belgium F1, Damme	Clay	(Germany) Oscar Otte	(Germany) Florian Fallert (Germany) Nils Langer	5–7, 1–6
Win	7–3	Jun 2014	Bulgaria F3, Stara Zagora	Clay	(Germany) Pirmin Hänle	(Italy) Francesco Garzelli (Russia) Alexander Igoshin	6–0, 6–3
Loss	7–4	Jan 2016	Germany F1, Schwieberdingen	Carpet (i)	(Germany) Oscar Otte	(Switzerland) Antoine Bellier (France) Hugo Grenier	4–6, 6–7^{(7–9)}
Win	8–4	Mar 2016	Portugal F3, Loulé	Hard	(Germany) Oscar Otte	(Portugal) Nuno Deus (Portugal) João Domingues	5–0 ret.
Win	9–4	Mar 2016	France F7, Villers-lès-Nancy	Hard (i)	(Germany) Oscar Otte	(Canada) Martin Beran (United Kingdom) Evan Hoyt	4–6, 6–4, [10–7]
Win	10–4	Apr 2016	Spain F7, Madrid	Hard	(Germany) Oscar Otte	(Romania) Patrick Grigoriu (Romania) Luca George Tatomir	2–6, 6–1, [10–3]
Win	11–4	Apr 2016	Tunisia F15, Hammamet	Clay	(United States) Catalin Gard	(Germany) Kevin Krawietz (France) Gianni Mina	7–5, 6–4
Win	12–4	Apr 2016	Tunisia F16, Hammamet	Clay	(United States) Catalin Gard	(Spain) Carlos Calderón (Spain) Pedro Martínez	7–6^{(7–3)}, 7–6^{(7–1)}
Win	13–4	May 2016	Czech Republic F1, Most	Clay	(Australia) Steven de Waard	(Czech Republic) Roman Jebavý (Czech Republic) Libor Salaba	5–7, 7–5, [10–7]
Win	14–4	May 2016	Czech Republic F2, Prague	Clay	(Germany) Oscar Otte	(Czech Republic) Zdeněk Kolář (Czech Republic) Petr Michnev	6–0, 6–4
Win	15–4	May 2016	Romania F4, Bacău	Clay	(Germany) Oscar Otte	(Colombia) Nicolás Barrientos (Ecuador) Emilio Gómez	6–3, 6–3
Win	16–4	Aug 2016	Germany F9, Essen	Clay	(Australia) Steven de Waard	(Netherlands) Michiel de Krom (Netherlands) Bart Stevens	7–5, 6–4
Win	17–4	Oct 2016	Germany F16, Bad Salzdetfurth	Carpet (i)	(Germany) Oscar Otte	(Germany) Marvin Möller (Germany) Tim Rühl	6–7^{(3–7)}, 6–4, [10–7]
Loss	17–5	Nov 2016	Finland F4, Helsinki	Hard (i)	(Netherlands) David Pel	(Germany) Jeremy Jahn (Poland) Adam Majchrowicz	6–3, 6–7^{(4–7)}, [8–10]
Win	18–5	Jan 2017	Germany F3, Nußloch	Carpet (i)	(Germany) Oscar Otte	(Poland) Mateusz Kowalczyk (Poland) Grzegorz Panfil	6–3, 6–0
Loss	18–6	May 2019	M15 Troisdorf, Germany	Clay	(Germany) Mike Döring	(Romania) Patrick Grigoriu (Germany) Christoph Negritu	5–7, 7–5, [10–12]

== National participation ==
=== Davis Cup (4–0) ===
Group membership Finals (2–0) Qualifying round (2–0)	Matches by type Singles (0–0) Doubles (4–0)	Matches by venue Germany (2–0) Away (0–0) Neutral (2–0)

Date	Venue	Surface	Rd	Opponent nation	Score	Match	Opponent players	W/L	Rubber score
2019
Nov 2019	Madrid	Hard (i)	RR	Argentina	3–0	Doubles (w/ K Krawietz)	M González / L Mayer	Win	6–7^{(4–7)}, 7–6^{(7–2)}, 7–6^{(20–18)}
Nov 2019	Madrid	Hard (i)	RR	Chile	2–1	Doubles (w/ K Krawietz)	A Tabilo / T Barrios Vera	Win	7–6^{(7–3)}, 6–3
2020
Mar 2020	Düsseldorf	Hard (i)	QR	Belarus	4–1	Doubles (w/ K Krawietz)	I Ivashka / A Vasilevski	Win	6–4, 7–6^{(7–5)}
2023
Feb 2023	Trier	Hard (i)	QR	Switzerland	2–3	Doubles (w/ T Pütz)	D Stricker / S Wawrinka	Win	6–7^{(3–7)}, 6–3, 6–4

=== ATP Cup (1–2) ===
Venue	Surface	Rd	Opponent nation	Score	Match	Opponent players	W/L	Match score
2020
Brisbane	Hard	RR	Australia	0–3	Doubles (w/ K Krawietz)	C Guccione / J Peers	Loss	3–6, 4–6
Brisbane	Hard	RR	Greece	2–1	Doubles (w/ K Krawietz)	M Pervolarakis / S Tsitsipas	Win	3–6, 6–3, [17–15]
Brisbane	Hard	RR	Canada	1–2	Doubles (w/ K Krawietz)	F Auger-Aliassime / D Shapovalov	Loss	3–6, 6–7^{(4–7)}
