= Garden Open =

ATP Challenger Tour
- Event name: Roma Garden Open (2015-)
- Location: Rome, Italy
- Venue: Tennis Club Garden, Roma
- Category: ATP Challenger Tour
- Surface: Clay
- Draw: 32S/26Q/16D
- Prize money: €54,000 (025), 42,500+H
- Website: Website

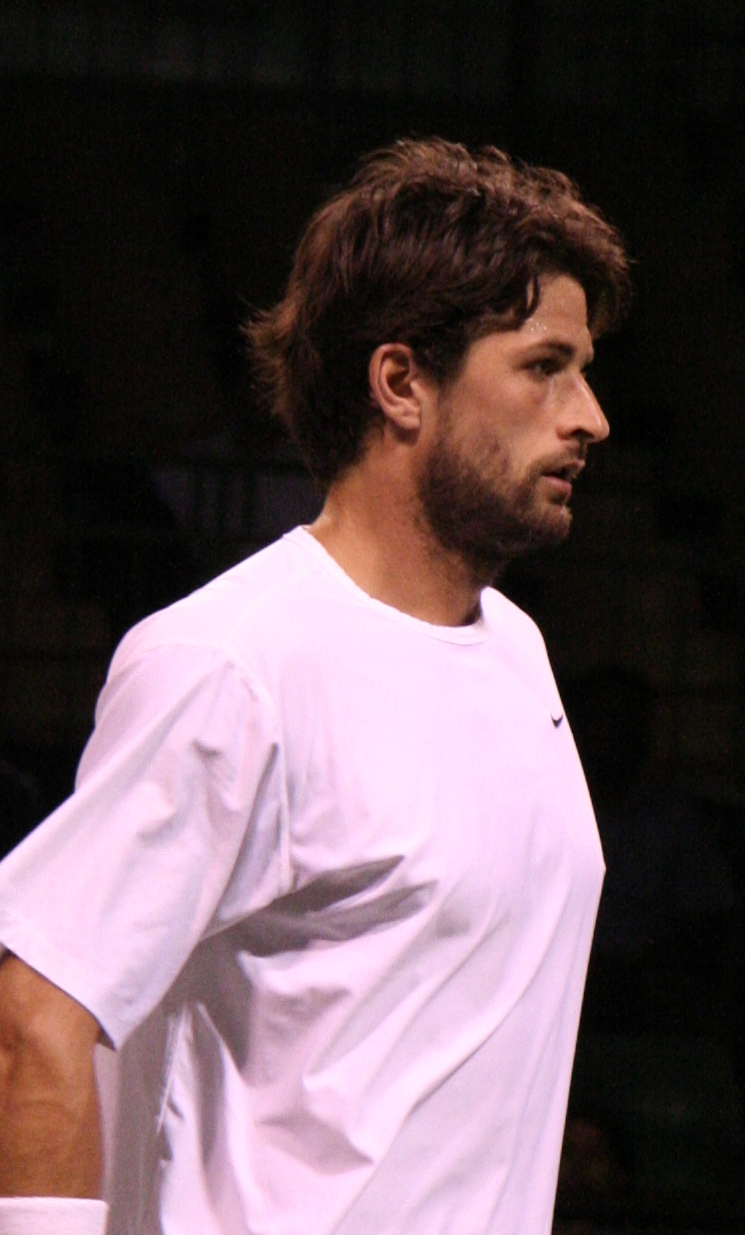
Olivier Patience defeated Florent Serra in the 2005 all-French singles final

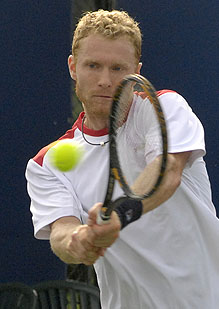
Russia's Dmitry Tursunov took the doubles in 2005 with Manuel Jorquera

The Roma Garden Open (formerly known as Roma Open and Rai Open) is a professional tennis tournament played on outdoor red clay courts. It is currently part of the ATP Challenger Tour. It is held annually at the Tennis Club Garden in Rome, Italy, since 1996 (as a Satellite from 1996 to 1999, and in 2001, as a Futures in 2000, as a Challenger since 2002).

== Past finals ==
=== Singles ===
Year	Champion	Runner-up	Score
2026	(Italy) Andrea Guerrieri	(Czech Republic) Dalibor Svrčina	6–4, 2–6, 6–1
2025	(Italy) Matteo Gigante	(Lithuania) Vilius Gaubas	6–2, 3–6, 6–4
2024	(Spain) Alejandro Moro Cañas	(Lithuania) Vilius Gaubas	7–5, 6–3
2023	(India) Sumit Nagal	(Netherlands) Jesper de Jong	6–3, 6–2
2022	(Italy) Franco Agamenone	(Italy) Gian Marco Moroni	6–1, 6–4
2021 (2)	(Argentina) Juan Manuel Cerúndolo	(Italy) Flavio Cobolli	6–2, 3–6, 6–3
2021 (1)	(Italy) Andrea Pellegrino	(France) Hugo Gaston	3–6, 6–2, 6–1
2020	Not Held		
2019	(Switzerland) Henri Laaksonen	(Italy) Gian Marco Moroni	6–7^{(2–7)}, 7–6^{(7–2)}, 6–2
2018	(Czech Republic) Adam Pavlásek	(Serbia) Laslo Djere	7–6^{(7–1)}, 6–7^{(9–11)}, 6–4
2017	(Italy) Marco Cecchinato	(Slovakia) Jozef Kovalík	6–4, 6–4
2016	(United Kingdom) Kyle Edmund	(Serbia) Filip Krajinović	7–6^{(7–2)}, 6–0
2015	(Slovenia) Aljaž Bedene	(Czech Republic) Adam Pavlásek	7–5, 6–2
2014	(Germany) Julian Reister	(Uruguay) Pablo Cuevas	6–3, 6–2
2013	(Slovenia) Aljaž Bedene	(Italy) Filippo Volandri	6–4, 6–2
2012	(Poland) Jerzy Janowicz	(Luxembourg) Gilles Müller	7–6(3), 6–3
2011	(Italy) Simone Bolelli	(Argentina) Eduardo Schwank	2–6, 6–1, 6–3
2010	(Argentina) Federico Delbonis	(Germany) Florian Mayer	6–4, 6–3
2009	(Austria) Daniel Köllerer	(Sweden) Andreas Vinciguerra	6–3, 6–3
2008	(Argentina) Eduardo Schwank	(France) Éric Prodon	6–3, 6–7(2), 7–6(3)
2007	(France) Thierry Ascione	(Romania) Victor Crivoi	6–3, 6–3
2006	(Austria) Oliver Marach	(Romania) Adrian Ungur	4–6, 6–4, 7–5
2005	(France) Olivier Patience	(France) Florent Serra	7–6(4), 7–5
2004	(France) Nicolas Coutelot	(Spain) Guillermo García López	5–7, 7–5, 6–2
2003	(Italy) Giorgio Galimberti	(Romania) Victor Hănescu	6–2, 6–4
2002	(Argentina) Martín Vassallo Argüello	(Italy) Filippo Volandri	6–4, 6–0

=== Doubles ===
Year	Champions	Runners-up	Score
2026	(Colombia) Nicolás Barrientos (Uruguay) Ariel Behar	(Slovakia) Miloš Karol (Czech Republic) Andrew Paulson	7–6^{(7–4)}, 4–6, [10–7]
2025	(Sweden) Erik Grevelius (Sweden) Adam Heinonen	(Italy) Marco Bortolotti (Italy) Giorgio Ricca	7–6^{(7–2)}, 7–5
2024	(United Kingdom) Luke Johnson (Tunisia) Skander Mansouri	(Italy) Lorenzo Rottoli (Italy) Samuel Vincent Ruggeri	6–2, 6–4
2023	(Colombia) Nicolás Barrientos (Portugal) Francisco Cabral	(Kazakhstan) Andrey Golubev (Ukraine) Denys Molchanov	6–3, 6–1
2022	(Netherlands) Jesper de Jong (Netherlands) Bart Stevens	(France) Sadio Doumbia (France) Fabien Reboul	3–6, 7–5, [10–8]
2021 (2)	(France) Sadio Doumbia (France) Fabien Reboul	(Argentina) Guido Andreozzi (Argentina) Guillermo Durán	7–5, 6–3
2021 (1)	(France) Sadio Doumbia (France) Fabien Reboul	(Italy) Paolo Lorenzi (Peru) Juan Pablo Varillas	7–6^{(7–5)}, 7–5
2020	Not Held		
2019	(Austria) Philipp Oswald (Slovakia) Filip Polášek	(Serbia) Nikola Ćaćić (Czech Republic) Adam Pavlásek	Walkover
2018	(Germany) Kevin Krawietz (Germany) Andreas Mies	(Belgium) Sander Gillé (Belgium) Joran Vliegen	6–3, 2–6, [10–4]
2017	(Germany) Andreas Mies (Germany) Oscar Otte	(Belgium) Kimmer Coppejans (Hungary) Márton Fucsovics	4–6, 7–6^{(14–12)}, [10–8]
2016	(China) Bai Yan (China) Li Zhe	(Netherlands) Sander Arends (Austria) Tristan-Samuel Weissborn	6–3, 3–6, [11–9]
2015	(Germany) Dustin Brown (Czech Republic) František Čermák	(Argentina) Andrés Molteni (Argentina) Marco Trungelliti	6–1, 6–2
2014	(Moldova) Radu Albot (New Zealand) Artem Sitak	(Italy) Andrea Arnaboldi (Italy) Flavio Cipolla	4–6, 6–2, [11–9]
2013	(Germany) Andre Begemann (Germany) Martin Emmrich	(Germany) Philipp Marx (Romania) Florin Mergea	7–6^{(7–4)}, 6–3
2012	(United Kingdom) Jamie Delgado (United Kingdom) Ken Skupski	(Spain) Adrián Menéndez (Italy) Walter Trusendi	6–1, 6–4
2011	(Colombia) Juan Sebastián Cabal (Colombia) Robert Farah	(Mexico) Santiago González (United States) Travis Rettenmaier	2–6, 6–3, [11–9]
2010	(Croatia) Mario Ančić (Croatia) Ivan Dodig	(Argentina) Juan Pablo Brzezicki (Spain) Rubén Ramírez Hidalgo	4–6, 7–6(8), [10–4]
2009	(Germany) Simon Greul (Germany) Christopher Kas	(Sweden) Johan Brunström (Netherlands Antilles) Jean-Julien Rojer	4–6, 7–6(2), 10–2
2008	(Italy) Flavio Cipolla (Italy) Simone Vagnozzi	(Italy) Paolo Lorenzi (Italy) Giancarlo Petrazzuolo	6–3, 6–3
2007	(Italy) Flavio Cipolla (Spain) Marcel Granollers	(Italy) Stefano Galvani (Italy) Manuel Jorquera	3–6, 6–1, 11–9
2006	(Greece) Konstantinos Economidis (Israel) Amir Hadad	(Italy) Manuel Jorquera (Italy) Giancarlo Petrazzuolo	6–4, 4–6, 10–5
2005	(Italy) Manuel Jorquera (Russia) Dmitry Tursunov	(Romania) Victor Ioniță (Romania) Răzvan Sabău	1–6, 7–6(4), 6–4
2004	(Hungary) Kornél Bardóczky (Hungary) Gergely Kisgyörgy	(Italy) Daniele Giorgini (Italy) Manuel Jorquera	7–6(4), 4–6, 6–4
2003	(Israel) Amir Hadad (Argentina) Martín Vassallo Argüello	(Italy) Manuel Jorquera (Argentina) Diego Moyano	6–4, 3–6, 6–3
2002	(Romania) Gabriel Trifu (Belarus) Vladimir Voltchkov	(Argentina) Sergio Roitman (Argentina) Andrés Schneiter	6–1, 6–2
