= 2010 Open Barletta – Singles =

Singles
- 2010 Open Barletta

Final
- Champion: (Spain) Pere Riba
- Runner-up: (Belgium) Steve Darcis
- Score: 6–3, ret.

Events
Singles	Doubles
← 2009 ·	Open Barletta	· 2011 →

Ivo Minář was the defending champion, however he lost to Pere Riba in the first round.
Pere Riba won in the final 6–3 (and retirement), against Steve Darcis.

== Seeds ==
1. (Finland) Jarkko Nieminen (quarterfinals)
2. (Spain) Santiago Ventura (first round)
3. (Belgium) Steve Darcis (final)
4. (Slovenia) Blaž Kavčič (quarterfinals)
5. (Russia) Igor Kunitsyn (quarterfinals)
6. (Spain) Pere Riba (champion)
7. (Spain) Iván Navarro (first round)
8. (Italy) Simone Bolelli (semifinals)

== Draw ==
=== Key ===
- Q = Qualifier
- WC = Wild card
- LL = Lucky loser
- Alt = Alternate
- SE = Special exempt
- PR = Protected ranking
- ITF = ITF entry
- JE = Junior exempt
- w/o = Walkover
- r = Retired
- d = Defaulted
- SR = Special ranking

=== Finals ===
Semifinals
6	(Spain) Pere Riba	6	0	6
8	(Italy) Simone Bolelli	3	6	2
3	(Belgium) Steve Darcis	6	6
(Argentina) Martín Vassallo Argüello	2	2

Final
6	(Spain) Pere Riba	6	0
3	(Belgium) Steve Darcis	3	0^{r}

=== Top half ===
First round
1	(Finland) J Nieminen	6	6
Q	(Argentina) M Alund	2	3
(Argentina) D Junqueira	6	6
WC	(Italy) A di Mauro	4	2
WC	(Italy) F Volandri	7	6
(Romania) A Ungur	5	2
(Czech Republic) I Minář	3	2
6	(Spain) P Riba	6	6
4	(Slovenia) B Kavčič	4	6	6
(Spain) A Martín	6	4	3
(Italy) F Cipolla	4	2
(Spain) D Marrero	6	6
WC	(Italy) T Fabbiano	1	6	3
SE	(Italy) M Trevisan	6	3	6
(Slovenia) G Žemlja	4	6^{2}
8	(Italy) S Bolelli	6	7

Second round
1	(Finland) J Nieminen	6	7
(Argentina) D Junqueira	3	5
WC	(Italy) F Volandri	5	0^{r}
6	(Spain) P Riba	7	1
4	(Slovenia) B Kavčič	7	5	6
(Spain) D Marrero	5	7	3
SE	(Italy) M Trevisan	6	0	5
8	(Italy) S Bolelli	3	6	7

Quarterfinals
1	(Finland) J Nieminen	1	3
6	(Spain) P Riba	6	6
4	(Slovenia) B Kavčič	5	5
8	(Italy) S Bolelli	7	7

Semifinals
6	(Spain) P Riba	6	0	6
8	(Italy) S Bolelli	3	6	2

=== Bottom half ===
First round
5	(Russia) I Kunitsyn	6	6
SE	(Netherlands) R Haase	4	4
Q	(Argentina) C Berlocq	0	1
(Kazakhstan) M Kukushkin	6	6
(United States) J Witten	6	6
(Belgium) K Vliegen	2	3
WC	(Croatia) F Škugor	4	6	2
3	(Belgium) S Darcis	6	3	6
7	(Spain) I Navarro	4	7	5
(Argentina) S Decoud	6	5	7
(Argentina) M Vassallo Argüello	6	6
(Serbia) I Bozoljac	1	1
Q	(Slovenia) A Bedene	6	6
Q	(Italy) A Brizzi	4	4
(Spain) A Ramos-Viñolas	6^{10}	7	6
2	(Spain) S Ventura	7	5	2

Second round
5	(Russia) I Kunitsyn	6	4	7
(Kazakhstan) M Kukushkin	2	6	6^{1}
(United States) J Witten	1	4
3	(Belgium) S Darcis	6	6
(Argentina) S Decoud	2	4
(Argentina) M Vassallo Argüello	6	6
Q	(Slovenia) A Bedene	7	6^{4}	6^{5}
(Spain) A Ramos-Viñolas	5	7	7

Quarterfinals
5	(Russia) I Kunitsyn	6^{2}	5
3	(Belgium) S Darcis	7	7
(Argentina) M Vassallo Argüello	7	6
(Spain) A Ramos-Viñolas	5	4

Semifinals
3	(Belgium) S Darcis	6	6
(Argentina) M Vassallo Argüello	2	2
