= 2011 Open Barletta Trofeo Dimiccoli & Boraccino – Doubles =

Doubles
- 2011 Open Barletta Trofeo Dimiccoli & Boraccino

Final
- Champions: (Czech Republic) Lukáš Rosol (Slovakia) Igor Zelenay
- Runners-up: (Austria) Martin Fischer (Austria) Andreas Haider-Maurer
- Score: 6–3, 6–2

Events
Singles	Doubles
← 2010 ·	Open Barletta Trofeo Dimiccoli & Boraccino	· 2012 →

David Marrero and Santiago Ventura were the defending champions but decided not to participate.
Lukáš Rosol and Igor Zelenay won the final after beating Martin Fischer and Andreas Haider-Maurer 6–3, 6–2.

== Seeds ==
1. (Italy) Daniele Bracciali / (Italy) Simone Vagnozzi (semifinals)
2. (United States) Travis Rettenmaier / (Croatia) Lovro Zovko (first round)
3. (Germany) Martin Emmrich / (Poland) Mateusz Kowalczyk (first round)
4. (United States) Travis Parrott / (Slovakia) Filip Polášek (semifinals)

== Draw ==
=== Key ===
- Q = Qualifier
- WC = Wild card
- LL = Lucky loser
- Alt = Alternate
- ITF = ITF entry
- PR = Protected ranking
- SR = Special ranking
- SE = Special exempt
- JE = Junior exempt
- JR = Junior Accelerator Programme entrant
- CO = College Accelerator Programme entrant
- NG = Next Gen Accelerator Program entrant
- w/o = Walkover
- r = Retired
- d = Defaulted

=== Draw ===
First round
1	(Italy) D Bracciali (Italy) S Vagnozzi	3	6	[10]
(Netherlands) J Huta Galung (Netherlands) I Sijsling	6	4	[6]
WC	(Italy) M Trevisan (Italy) F Volandri	3	2
(Italy) A di Mauro (Italy) A Motti	6	6
3	(Germany) M Emmrich (Poland) M Kowalczyk	4	3
(Austria) M Fischer (Austria) A Haider-Maurer	6	6
WC	(Slovenia) A Bedene (Slovenia) Andraž Bedene	4	4
Alt	(Italy) Andrea Arnaboldi (Italy) G Naso	6	6
WC	(Italy) A Brizzi (Italy) M Crugnola	6	6
(Spain) G Olaso (Spain) P Riba	1	3
(United States) B Battistone (Netherlands) T Schoorel	2	3
4	(United States) T Parrott (Slovakia) F Polášek	6	6
(Germany) D Gremelmayr (Netherlands) R Wassen	5	0
(Czech Republic) J Pospíšil (Austria) M Slanar	7	6
(Czech Republic) L Rosol (Slovakia) I Zelenay	6	6
2	(United States) T Rettenmaier (Croatia) L Zovko	4	1

Quarterfinals
1	(Italy) D Bracciali (Italy) S Vagnozzi	6	6
(Italy) A di Mauro (Italy) A Motti	4	2
(Austria) M Fischer (Austria) A Haider-Maurer	6	6
Alt	(Italy) Andrea Arnaboldi (Italy) G Naso	3	2
WC	(Italy) A Brizzi (Italy) M Crugnola	2	3
4	(United States) T Parrott (Slovakia) F Polášek	6	6
(Czech Republic) J Pospíšil (Austria) M Slanar	6	4	[9]
(Czech Republic) L Rosol (Slovakia) I Zelenay	4	6	[11]

Semifinals
1	(Italy) D Bracciali (Italy) S Vagnozzi	5	2
(Austria) M Fischer (Austria) A Haider-Maurer	7	6
4	(United States) T Parrott (Slovakia) F Polášek	6^{3}	6	[8]
(Czech Republic) L Rosol (Slovakia) I Zelenay	7	4	[10]

Final
(Austria) M Fischer (Austria) A Haider-Maurer	3	2
(Czech Republic) L Rosol (Slovakia) I Zelenay	6	6
