= 2017 Open Città della Disfida – Doubles =

Doubles
- 2017 Open Città della Disfida

Final
- Champions: (Italy) Marco Cecchinato (Italy) Matteo Donati
- Runners-up: (Croatia) Marin Draganja (Croatia) Tomislav Draganja
- Score: 6–3, 6–4

Events
Singles	Doubles
← 2016 ·	Open Città della Disfida	· 2018 →

Johan Brunström and Andreas Siljeström were the defending champions but lost in the quarterfinals to Marin and Tomislav Draganja.

Marco Cecchinato and Matteo Donati won the title after defeating Draganja and Draganja 6–3, 6–4 in the final.

== Seeds ==
1. (Sweden) Johan Brunström / (Sweden) Andreas Siljeström (quarterfinals)
2. (United Kingdom) Ken Skupski / (United Kingdom) Neal Skupski (first round)
3. (Poland) Tomasz Bednarek / (Czech Republic) Roman Jebavý (semifinals)
4. (Italy) Alessandro Motti / (Belgium) Joran Vliegen (first round)

== Draw ==
=== Key ===
- Q = Qualifier
- WC = Wild card
- LL = Lucky loser
- Alt = Alternate
- SE = Special exempt
- PR = Protected ranking
- ITF = ITF entry
- JE = Junior exempt
- w/o = Walkover
- r = Retired
- d = Defaulted
- SR = Special ranking

First round
1	(Sweden) J Brunström (Sweden) A Siljeström	6	6
(Australia) R Junaid (Germany) G Kretschmer	4	2
(Croatia) M Draganja (Croatia) T Draganja	6	6
WC	(Spain) S Martos Gornés (Netherlands) M Vervoort	4	1
4	(Italy) A Motti (Belgium) J Vliegen	6	3	[9]
(Italy) T Fabbiano (Italy) S Travaglia	4	6	[11]
PR	(Serbia) I Bozoljac (Serbia) N Milojević	3	6	[10]
WC	(Italy) GM Moroni (Italy) A Pellegrino	6	3	[5]
WC	(Italy) G Mager (Italy) L Sonego	6	6^{7}	[5]
(Spain) E López-Pérez (Argentina) M Trungelliti	4	7^{9}	[10]
(France) M Janvier (France) T Lamasine	4	4
3	(Poland) T Bednarek (Czech Republic) R Jebavý	6	6
(Brazil) G Clezar (Czech Republic) L Rosol	4	3
(Germany) M Marterer (Italy) S Napolitano	6	6
(Italy) M Cecchinato (Italy) M Donati	6	6
2	(United Kingdom) K Skupski (United Kingdom) N Skupski	4	1

Quarterfinals
1	(Sweden) J Brunström (Sweden) A Siljeström	6^{7}	5
(Croatia) M Draganja (Croatia) T Draganja	7^{9}	7
(Italy) T Fabbiano (Italy) S Travaglia
PR	(Serbia) I Bozoljac (Serbia) N Milojević	w/o
(Spain) E López-Pérez (Argentina) M Trungelliti	2	6^{5}
3	(Poland) T Bednarek (Czech Republic) R Jebavý	6	7^{7}
(Germany) M Marterer (Italy) S Napolitano	3	2
(Italy) M Cecchinato (Italy) M Donati	6	6

Semifinals
(Croatia) M Draganja (Croatia) T Draganja	6	6
PR	(Serbia) I Bozoljac (Serbia) N Milojević	2	4
3	(Poland) T Bednarek (Czech Republic) R Jebavý	6	6^{4}	[8]
(Italy) M Cecchinato (Italy) M Donati	4	7^{7}	[10]

Final
(Croatia) M Draganja (Croatia) T Draganja	3	4
(Italy) M Cecchinato (Italy) M Donati	6	6
