= 2022 Open Città della Disfida – Singles =

Singles
- 2022 Open Città della Disfida

Final
- Champion: (Portugal) Nuno Borges
- Runner-up: (Serbia) Miljan Zekić
- Score: 6–3, 7–5

Events
Singles	Doubles
← 2021 ·	Open Città della Disfida	· 2023 →

Giulio Zeppieri was the defending champion but lost in the first round to Matteo Arnaldi.

Nuno Borges won the title after defeating Miljan Zekić 6–3, 7–5 in the final.

== Seeds ==
1. (France) Gilles Simon (first round)
2. (Portugal) Nuno Borges (champion)
3. (Czech Republic) Zdeněk Kolář (semifinals)
4. (Austria) Jurij Rodionov (first round)
5. (Italy) Franco Agamenone (first round)
6. (France) Enzo Couacaud (second round)
7. (France) Constant Lestienne (first round)
8. (Poland) Kacper Żuk (first round)

== Draw ==
=== Key ===
- Q = Qualifier
- WC = Wild card
- LL = Lucky loser
- Alt = Alternate
- SE = Special exempt
- PR = Protected ranking
- ITF = ITF entry
- JE = Junior exempt
- w/o = Walkover
- r = Retired
- d = Defaulted
- SR = Special ranking

=== Finals ===
Semifinals
WC	(Italy) Luca Nardi	7^{7}	5	6^{2}
Q	(Serbia) Miljan Zekić	6^{4}	7	7^{7}
3	(Czech Republic) Zdeněk Kolář	6^{7}	3
2	(Portugal) Nuno Borges	7^{9}	6

Final
Q	(Serbia) Miljan Zekić	3	5
2	(Portugal) Nuno Borges	6	7

=== Top half ===
First round
1	(France) G Simon	2	6	4
(Romania) M Copil	6	4	6
WC	(Italy) L Nardi	6	6
(France) A Müller	1	4
Q	(Italy) M Arnaldi	0	7^{7}	7^{7}
(Italy) G Zeppieri	6	6^{4}	6^{4}
(France) G Blancaneaux	6	6^{4}	6
8	(Poland) K Żuk	4	7^{7}	3
4	(Austria) J Rodionov	0	2
(Italy) R Bonadio	6	6
Alt	A Shevchenko	2	6	6
(Czech Republic) D Svrčina	6	0	2
Q	(Serbia) M Zekić	2	6	6
(Italy) A Arnaboldi	6	4	0
WC	(Italy) F Passaro	6	6
5	(Italy) F Agamenone	4	3

Second round
(Romania) M Copil
WC	(Italy) L Nardi	w/o
Q	(Italy) M Arnaldi	3	4
(France) G Blancaneaux	6	6
(Italy) R Bonadio	6	6^{6}	0^{r}
Alt	A Shevchenko	3	7^{8}	3
Q	(Serbia) M Zekić	2	7^{12}	6
WC	(Italy) F Passaro	6	6^{10}	0

Quarterfinals
WC	(Italy) L Nardi	6	6
(France) G Blancaneaux	2	4
Alt	A Shevchenko	4	4
Q	(Serbia) M Zekić	6	6

Semifinals
WC	(Italy) L Nardi	7^{7}	5	6^{2}
Q	(Serbia) M Zekić	6^{4}	7	7^{7}

=== Bottom half ===
First round
7	(France) C Lestienne	7	4	0
Alt	(Netherlands) J Sels	5	6	6
(France) G Barrère	3	3
(Bosnia and Herzegovina) N Fatić	6	6
Q	(Germany) Lucas Gerch	6	3	3
(Italy) A Pellegrino	2	6	6
Q	(Italy) F Forti	2	0
3	(Czech Republic) Z Kolář	6	6
6	(France) E Couacaud	6	6
(Italy) L Giustino	4	4
Alt	E Karlovskiy	7^{7}	3	3
Q	(Italy) L Darderi	6^{3}	6	6
(Czech Republic) L Rosol	5	6	3
WC	(Ukraine) O Ovcharenko	7	2	6
Q	(France) T Droguet	1	4
2	(Portugal) N Borges	6	6

Second round
Alt	(Netherlands) J Sels	5	6	7
(Bosnia and Herzegovina) N Fatić	7	1	5
(Italy) A Pellegrino	3	2
3	(Czech Republic) Z Kolář	6	6
6	(France) E Couacaud	6	6^{1}	2
Q	(Italy) L Darderi	4	7^{7}	6
WC	(Ukraine) O Ovcharenko	6^{3}	4
2	(Portugal) N Borges	7^{7}	6

Quarterfinals
Alt	(Netherlands) J Sels	7	5	1
3	(Czech Republic) Z Kolář	5	7	6
Q	(Italy) L Darderi	6	6^{4}	1
2	(Portugal) N Borges	1	7^{7}	6

Semifinals
3	(Czech Republic) Z Kolář	6^{7}	3
2	(Portugal) N Borges	7^{9}	6
