= 2010 Open Barletta – Doubles =

Doubles
- 2010 Open Barletta

Final
- Champions: (Spain) Santiago Ventura (Spain) David Marrero
- Runners-up: (Serbia) Ilija Bozoljac (Italy) Daniele Bracciali
- Score: 6–3, 6–3

Events
Singles	Doubles
- Open Barletta

Santiago Ventura and Rubén Ramírez Hidalgo were the defending champions, but Ramírez Hidalgo chose to not participate this year.

Ventura Bertomeu partnered up by her other compatriot David Marrero and won in the final 6–3, 6–3 over Ilija Bozoljac and Daniele Bracciali.

== Seeds ==
1. (Spain) David Marrero / (Spain) Santiago Ventura (champion)
2. (Russia) Igor Kunitsyn / (Kazakhstan) Yuri Schukin (first round)
3. (Italy) Flavio Cipolla / (Italy) Alessandro Motti (semifinals)
4. (Brazil) Marcelo Demoliner / (Brazil) Rodrigo Guidolin (first round)

== Draw ==
Key

- Q = Qualifier
- WC = Wild card
- LL = Lucky loser
- Alt = Alternate
- ITF = ITF entry
- PR = Protected ranking
- SR = Special ranking
- SE = Special exempt
- JE = Junior exempt
- JR = Junior Accelerator Programme entrant
- CO = College Accelerator Programme entrant
- NG = Next Gen Accelerator Program entrant
- w/o = Walkover
- r = Retired
- d = Defaulted

=== Draw ===
First round
1	(Spain) D Marrero (Spain) S Ventura	6	6
WC	(Croatia) F Škugor (Croatia) I Zovko	3	3
(Spain) A Ramos-Viñolas (Spain) P Riba	6	6
(Argentina) D Junqueira (Argentina) M Vassallo Argüello	4	4
4	(Brazil) M Demoliner (Brazil) R Guidolin	4	5
(Belgium) S Darcis (Belgium) K Vliegen	6	7
(Brazil) R Dutra da Silva (Brazil) C Zampieri	3	1
WC	(Italy) T Fabbiano (Italy) M Trevisan	6	6
(Argentina) J-M Aranguren (Argentina) C Berlocq	6	7
(Argentina) D Álvarez (Argentina) F del Bonis	4	5
(United States) J Witten (Slovenia) G Žemlja	7	2	[4]
3	(Italy) F Cipolla (Italy) A Motti	6^{4}	6	[10]
(Argentina) S Decoud (Russia) D Sitak	4	4
WC	(Bosnia and Herzegovina) M Bašić (Italy) G Torroni	6	6
(Serbia) I Bozoljac (Italy) D Bracciali	6	6
2	(Russia) I Kunitsyn (Kazakhstan) Y Schukin	4	4

Quarterfinals
1	(Spain) D Marrero (Spain) S Ventura	6	6
(Spain) A Ramos-Viñolas (Spain) P Riba	3	2
(Belgium) S Darcis (Belgium) K Vliegen
WC	(Italy) T Fabbiano (Italy) M Trevisan	w/o
(Argentina) J-M Aranguren (Argentina) C Berlocq	1	0
3	(Italy) F Cipolla (Italy) A Motti	6	6
WC	(Bosnia and Herzegovina) M Bašić (Italy) G Torroni	5	6	[4]
(Serbia) I Bozoljac (Italy) D Bracciali	7	3	[10]

Semifinals
1	(Spain) D Marrero (Spain) S Ventura	6	7
(Belgium) S Darcis (Belgium) K Vliegen	4	6^{6}
3	(Italy) F Cipolla (Italy) A Motti	4	7	[5]
(Serbia) I Bozoljac (Italy) D Bracciali	6	6^{6}	[10]

Finals
1	(Spain) D Marrero (Spain) S Ventura	6	6
(Serbia) I Bozoljac (Italy) D Bracciali	3	3
