= 2011 Open Barletta Trofeo Dimiccoli & Boraccino – Singles =

Singles
- 2011 Open Barletta Trofeo Dimiccoli & Boraccino

Final
- Champion: (Slovenia) Aljaž Bedene
- Runner-up: (Italy) Filippo Volandri
- Score: 7–5, 6–3

Events
Singles	Doubles
← 2010 ·	Open Barletta Trofeo Dimiccoli & Boraccino	· 2012 →

Pere Riba was the defending champion, however lost to Alessio di Mauro already in the first round.
Aljaž Bedene, who received wildcard into the singles main draw, won this tournament. He defeated 3rd seed Filippo Volandri in the final.

== Seeds ==
1. (Italy) Fabio Fognini (first round)
2. (Spain) Pere Riba (first round)
3. (Italy) Filippo Volandri (final)
4. (Slovenia) Blaž Kavčič (first round)
5. (Czech Republic) Jan Hájek (withdrew)
6. (Germany) Denis Gremelmayr (first round)
7. (Spain) Albert Ramos (second round)
8. (Czech Republic) Jaroslav Pospíšil (quarterfinals)

== Draw ==
=== Key ===
- Q = Qualifier
- WC = Wild card
- LL = Lucky loser
- Alt = Alternate
- SE = Special exempt
- PR = Protected ranking
- ITF = ITF entry
- JE = Junior exempt
- w/o = Walkover
- r = Retired
- d = Defaulted
- SR = Special ranking

=== Finals ===
Semifinals
(Austria) Andreas Haider-Maurer	4	3
3	(Italy) Filippo Volandri	6	6
(Czech Republic) Lukáš Rosol	3	5
WC	(Slovenia) Aljaž Bedene	6	7

Final
3	(Italy) Filippo Volandri	5	3
WC	(Slovenia) Aljaž Bedene	7	6

=== Top half ===
First round
1/WC	(Italy) F Fognini	3	6	3
(Austria) A Haider-Maurer	6	3	6
WC	(Italy) M Trevisan	4	5
(Netherlands) J Huta Galung	6	7
Q	(France) P-H Herbert	1	0
(Italy) M Viola	6	6
(Netherlands) T Schoorel	6	6
6	(Germany) D Gremelmayr	4	4
3	(Italy) F Volandri	6	7
(Italy) M Crugnola	1	5
(Slovakia) I Klec	1	2
(Australia) P Luczak	6	6
(Romania) A Ungur	6	6
(Kazakhstan) Y Schukin	3	4
Q	(Italy) A Brizzi	1	3
8	(Czech Republic) J Pospíšil	6	6

Second round
(Austria) A Haider-Maurer	7	6
(Netherlands) J Huta Galung	5	1
(Italy) M Viola	4	7	6^{3}
(Netherlands) T Schoorel	6	5	7
3	(Italy) F Volandri	2	6	7
(Australia) P Luczak	6	3	6^{5}
(Romania) A Ungur	2	4
8	(Czech Republic) J Pospíšil	6	6

Quarterfinals
(Austria) A Haider-Maurer	6	6
(Netherlands) T Schoorel	3	2
3	(Italy) F Volandri	6^{5}	7	6
8	(Czech Republic) J Pospíšil	7	6^{1}	1

Semifinals
(Austria) A Haider-Maurer	4	3
3	(Italy) F Volandri	6	6

=== Bottom half ===
First round
LL	(Italy) G Naso	5	6^{0}
(Czech Republic) L Rosol	7	7
(Austria) M Fischer	6	6
WC	(Austria) T Muster	0	3
Q	(Italy) Adelchi Virgili	2	2
(Czech Republic) I Minář	6	6
(Italy) S Vagnozzi	4
4	(Slovenia) B Kavčič	3^{r}
7	(Spain) A Ramos	6^{5}	6	6
(Romania) M Copil	7	4	1
WC	(Slovenia) A Bedene	6	7
(Netherlands) I Sijsling	1	5
Q	(Italy) Andrea Arnaboldi	6	7
(Spain) G Olaso	1	6^{3}
(Italy) A di Mauro	1	6	7
2	(Spain) P Riba	6	2	6^{5}

Second round
(Czech Republic) L Rosol	6^{3}	7	6
(Austria) M Fischer	7	5	2
(Czech Republic) I Minář	2	3
(Italy) S Vagnozzi	6	6
7	(Spain) A Ramos	6	4	5
WC	(Slovenia) A Bedene	2	6	7
Q	(Italy) Andrea Arnaboldi	4	6	3
(Italy) A di Mauro	6	4	6

Quarterfinals
(Czech Republic) L Rosol	6	7
(Italy) S Vagnozzi	2	5
WC	(Slovenia) A Bedene	6	4	6
(Italy) A di Mauro	0	6	3

Semifinals
(Czech Republic) L Rosol	3	5
WC	(Slovenia) A Bedene	6	7
