= 2016 Open Città della Disfida – Doubles =

Doubles
- 2016 Open Città della Disfida

Final
- Champion: (Sweden) Johan Brunström (Sweden) Andreas Siljeström
- Runner-up: (Italy) Flavio Cipolla (Brazil) Rogério Dutra Silva
- Score: 0–6, 6–4, [10–8]

Events
Singles	Doubles
← 2012 ·	Open Città della Disfida	· 2017 →

Johan Brunström and Dick Norman were the defending champions, but only Brunström chose to defend his title, partnering Andreas Siljeström.

Brunström and Siljeström won the title, defeating Flavio Cipolla and Rogério Dutra Silva 0–6, 6–4, [10–8] in the final.

== Seeds ==
1. (Argentina) Guillermo Durán / (Argentina) Andrés Molteni (first round)
2. (Slovakia) Andrej Martin / (Chile) Hans Podlipnik (first round)
3. (United Kingdom) Jonathan Marray / (Slovakia) Igor Zelenay (first round)
4. (Sweden) Johan Brunström / (Sweden) Andreas Siljeström (champions)

== Draw ==
=== Key ===
- Q = Qualifier
- WC = Wild card
- LL = Lucky loser
- Alt = Alternate
- SE = Special exempt
- PR = Protected ranking
- ITF = ITF entry
- JE = Junior exempt
- w/o = Walkover
- r = Retired
- d = Defaulted
- SR = Special ranking

First round
1	(Argentina) G Durán (Argentina) A Molteni	7	1	[8]
(Kazakhstan) A Golubev (Germany) F Moser	5	6	[10]
WC	(Czech Republic) L Dlouhý (Spain) S Martos Gornés	6	4	[10]
(Poland) T Bednarek (Canada) A Shamasdin	4	6	[5]
3	(United Kingdom) J Marray (Slovakia) I Zelenay	2	4
(Italy) F Cipolla (Brazil) R Dutra Silva	6	6
(Germany) G Kretschmer (Germany) A Satschko	6	4	[10]
(Croatia) D Marcan (Netherlands) M Vervoort	4	6	[5]
WC	(Italy) S Napolitano (Italy) A Pellegrino	7	4	[10]
(Portugal) G Elias (Italy) A Giannessi	5	6	[6]
(Italy) A Motti (Sweden) E Ymer	7^{7}	6^{2}	[2]
4	(Sweden) J Brunström (Sweden) A Siljeström	6^{3}	7^{7}	[10]
(Netherlands) M Middelkoop (Netherlands) I Sijsling	6	6
Alt	(Italy) Omar Giacalone (Italy) G Naso	2	2
(Austria) T-S Weissborn (Estonia) J Zopp	6^{5}	6	[10]
2	(Slovakia) A Martin (Chile) H Podlipnik	7^{7}	3	[5]

Quarterfinals
(Kazakhstan) A Golubev (Germany) F Moser	6	6
WC	(Czech Republic) L Dlouhý (Spain) S Martos Gornés	2	4
(Italy) F Cipolla (Brazil) R Dutra Silva	6	6
(Germany) G Kretschmer (Germany) A Satschko	4	1
WC	(Italy) S Napolitano (Italy) A Pellegrino	6	3	[8]
4	(Sweden) J Brunström (Sweden) A Siljeström	4	6	[10]
(Netherlands) M Middelkoop (Netherlands) I Sijsling	6	6^{3}	[3]
(Austria) T-S Weissborn (Estonia) J Zopp	3	7^{7}	[10]

Semifinals
(Kazakhstan) A Golubev (Germany) F Moser	1	0
(Italy) F Cipolla (Brazil) R Dutra Silva	6	6
4	(Sweden) J Brunström (Sweden) A Siljeström	6	6
(Austria) T-S Weissborn (Estonia) J Zopp	1	4

Final
(Italy) F Cipolla (Brazil) R Dutra Silva	6	4	[8]
4	(Sweden) J Brunström (Sweden) A Siljeström	0	6	[10]
