= 2017 Open Città della Disfida – Singles =

Singles
- 2017 Open Città della Disfida

Final
- Champion: (United Kingdom) Aljaž Bedene
- Runner-up: (Portugal) Gastão Elias
- Score: 7–6^{(7–4)}, 6–3

Events
Singles	Doubles
← 2016 ·	Open Città della Disfida	· 2018 →

Elias Ymer was the defending champion but lost in the first round to Lukáš Rosol.

Aljaž Bedene won the title after defeating Gastão Elias 7–6^{(7–4)}, 6–3 in the final.

== Seeds ==
1. (Portugal) Gastão Elias (final)
2. (United Kingdom) Aljaž Bedene (champion)
3. (Slovakia) Norbert Gombos (first round)
4. (Italy) Alessandro Giannessi (quarterfinals)
5. (Belgium) Arthur De Greef (second round)
6. (Slovakia) Jozef Kovalík (first round)
7. (Germany) Maximilian Marterer (quarterfinals)
8. (Sweden) Elias Ymer (first round)

== Draw ==
=== Key ===
- Q = Qualifier
- WC = Wild card
- LL = Lucky loser
- Alt = Alternate
- SE = Special exempt
- PR = Protected ranking
- ITF = ITF entry
- JE = Junior exempt
- w/o = Walkover
- r = Retired
- d = Defaulted
- SR = Special ranking

=== Finals ===
Semifinals
1	(Portugal) Gastão Elias	6	6
(Italy) Lorenzo Giustino	4	3
WC	(Czech Republic) Lukáš Rosol	3	1
2	(United Kingdom) Aljaž Bedene	6	6

Final
1	(Portugal) Gastão Elias	6^{4}	3
2	(United Kingdom) Aljaž Bedene	7^{7}	6

=== Top half ===
First round
1	(Portugal) G Elias	4	6	6
WC	(Italy) M Berrettini	6	3	4
Q	(Italy) S Travaglia	6	6^{6}	6^{7}
(Italy) S Napolitano	4	7^{8}	7^{9}
Alt	(Belgium) K Coppejans	6	6
(Greece) S Tsitsipas	4	4
(France) C Lestienne	4	2
5	(Belgium) A De Greef	6	6
3	(Slovakia) N Gombos	4	6^{13}
(Italy) L Giustino	6	7^{15}
(Germany) D Brands	6	6^{5}	2
(Italy) F Gaio	4	7^{7}	6
(Italy) T Fabbiano	6	6
(Spain) J Samper-Montaña	3	2
Q	(Italy) L Sonego	3	6	1
7	(Germany) M Marterer	6	4	6

Second round
1	(Portugal) G Elias	6	6
(Italy) S Napolitano	4	2
Alt	(Belgium) K Coppejans	6	6
5	(Belgium) A De Greef	1	4
(Italy) L Giustino	6	6
(Italy) F Gaio	3	1
(Italy) T Fabbiano	2	5
7	(Germany) M Marterer	6	7

Quarterfinals
1	(Portugal) G Elias	7	6
Alt	(Belgium) K Coppejans	5	3
(Italy) L Giustino	6	6
7	(Germany) M Marterer	3	2

Semifinals
1	(Portugal) G Elias	6	6
(Italy) L Giustino	4	3

=== Bottom half ===
First round
8	(Sweden) E Ymer	3	4
WC	(Czech Republic) L Rosol	6	6
(Spain) E López-Pérez	6	4	7
(Portugal) P Sousa	1	6	5
(Serbia) N Milojević	7	6
(France) T Lamasine	5	1
(Italy) R Bellotti	3	3
4	(Italy) A Giannessi	6	6
6/SE	(Slovakia) J Kovalík	1	1
Q	(Serbia) F Krajinović	6	6
(Italy) M Cecchinato	6	6
Q	(Germany) Jeremy Jahn	0	1
WC	(Italy) A Pellegrino	3	6	3
WC	(Italy) M Donati	6	2	6
(Argentina) M Trungelliti	4	7	4
2	(United Kingdom) A Bedene	6	5	6

Second round
WC	(Czech Republic) L Rosol	6	6
(Spain) E López-Pérez	3	4
(Serbia) N Milojević	1	3
4	(Italy) A Giannessi	6	6
Q	(Serbia) F Krajinović	6	3	4
(Italy) M Cecchinato	4	6	6
WC	(Italy) M Donati	3	6^{5}
2	(United Kingdom) A Bedene	6	7^{7}

Quarterfinals
WC	(Czech Republic) L Rosol	2	6	6
4	(Italy) A Giannessi	6	3	3
(Italy) M Cecchinato	2	1
2	(United Kingdom) A Bedene	6	6

Semifinals
WC	(Czech Republic) L Rosol	3	1
2	(United Kingdom) A Bedene	6	6
