= 2022 Open Città della Disfida – Doubles =

Doubles
- 2022 Open Città della Disfida

Final
- Champions: Evgeny Karlovskiy; Evgenii Tiurnev
- Runners-up: (Japan) Ben McLachlan (Poland) Szymon Walków
- Score: 6–3, 6–4

Events
Singles	Doubles
← 2021 ·	Open Città della Disfida	· 2023 →

Marco Bortolotti and Cristian Rodríguez were the defending champions but chose not to defend their title.

Evgeny Karlovskiy and Evgenii Tiurnev won the title after defeating Ben McLachlan and Szymon Walków 6–3, 6–4 in the final.

== Seeds ==
1. (Japan) Ben McLachlan / (Poland) Szymon Walków (final)
2. (France) Sadio Doumbia / (France) Fabien Reboul (semifinals)
3. (Czech Republic) Roman Jebavý / (Czech Republic) Zdeněk Kolář (semifinals)
4. (Philippines) Ruben Gonzales / (Indonesia) Christopher Rungkat (first round)

== Draw ==
=== Key ===
- Q = Qualifier
- WC = Wild card
- LL = Lucky loser
- Alt = Alternate
- SE = Special exempt
- PR = Protected ranking
- ITF = ITF entry
- JE = Junior exempt
- w/o = Walkover
- r = Retired
- d = Defaulted
- SR = Special ranking

First round
1	(Japan) B McLachlan (Poland) S Walków	6	6
(France) G Blancaneaux (France) C Lestienne	2	2
(Italy) F Forti (Italy) G Zeppieri	2	7	[8]
WC	(Italy) S Napolitano (Italy) L Nardi	6	5	[10]
3	(Czech Republic) R Jebavý (Czech Republic) Z Kolář	6	1	[11]
WC	(Italy) F Agamenone (Italy) A Pellegrino	2	6	[9]
(Italy) M Arnaldi (Italy) F Passaro	4	6	[10]
(Greece) M Kalovelonis (Poland) P Matuszewski	6	2	[6]
Alt	B Bobrov; A Shevchenko	2	6	[6]
E Karlovskiy; E Tiurnev	6	4	[10]
(Poland) K Drzewiecki (Poland) K Żuk	7^{7}	2	[10]
4	(Philippines) R Gonzales (Indonesia) C Rungkat	6^{5}	6	[8]
(Switzerland) L Margaroli (Austria) J Rodionov	6	6
(Germany) H Jebens (Germany) Niklas Schell	3	1
(France) E Couacaud (France) G Simon	5	3
2	(France) S Doumbia (France) F Reboul	7	6

Quarterfinals
1	(Japan) B McLachlan (Poland) S Walków	6	3	[10]
WC	(Italy) S Napolitano (Italy) L Nardi	3	6	[4]
3	(Czech Republic) R Jebavý (Czech Republic) Z Kolář	6	3	[10]
(Italy) M Arnaldi (Italy) F Passaro	4	6	[5]
E Karlovskiy; E Tiurnev	6	6
(Poland) K Drzewiecki (Poland) K Żuk	3	4
(Switzerland) L Margaroli (Austria) J Rodionov	3	7^{7}	[8]
2	(France) S Doumbia (France) F Reboul	6	6^{4}	[10]

Semifinals
1	(Japan) B McLachlan (Poland) S Walków	6	6
3	(Czech Republic) R Jebavý (Czech Republic) Z Kolář	2	4
E Karlovskiy; E Tiurnev	7^{7}	7^{7}
2	(France) S Doumbia (France) F Reboul	6^{5}	6^{4}

Final
1	(Japan) B McLachlan (Poland) S Walków	3	4
E Karlovskiy; E Tiurnev	6	6
