= 2012 Open Barletta Trofeo Dimiccoli & Boraccino – Doubles =

Doubles
- 2012 Open Barletta Trofeo Dimiccoli & Boraccino

Final
- Champions: (Sweden) Johan Brunström (Belgium) Dick Norman
- Runners-up: (United Kingdom) Jonathan Marray (Slovakia) Igor Zelenay
- Score: 6–4, 7–5

Events
Singles	Doubles
← 2011 ·	Open Barletta Trofeo Dimiccoli & Boraccino	· 2016 →

Lukáš Rosol and Igor Zelenay were the defending champions but Rosol decided not to participate.
Zelenay played alongside Jonathan Marray.
Johan Brunström and Dick Norman won the title, defeating Marray and Zelenay 6–4, 7–5 in the final.

== Seeds ==
1. (Sweden) Johan Brunström / (Belgium) Dick Norman (champions)
2. (United Kingdom) Jonathan Marray / (Slovakia) Igor Zelenay (final)
3. (Italy) Alessio di Mauro / (Italy) Simone Vagnozzi (first round)
4. (Italy) Alessandro Motti / (Czech Republic) David Škoch (quarterfinals)

== Draw ==
=== Key ===
- Q = Qualifier
- WC = Wild card
- LL = Lucky loser
- Alt = Alternate
- SE = Special exempt
- PR = Protected ranking
- ITF = ITF entry
- JE = Junior exempt
- w/o = Walkover
- r = Retired
- d = Defaulted
- SR = Special ranking

=== Draw ===
First round
1	(Sweden) J Brunström (Belgium) D Norman	6	7
(Italy) Giammarco Micolani (Italy) Giorgio Portaluri	4	5
(Czech Republic) Jan Satral (Czech Republic) Michal Schmid	3	6	[0]
(Spain) J Martí (Spain) D Muñoz-de la Nava	6	3	[10]
4	(Italy) A Motti (Czech Republic) D Škoch	6	6
WC	(Italy) Francesco Faggella (Italy) Stefano Napolitano	3	0
(Slovenia) A Bedene (Serbia) M Zekic	6	6
(Italy) Enrico Burzi (Italy) S Galvani	3	2
(Italy) D Bracciali (Italy) A Giannessi	6	6
WC	(Serbia) F Krajinović (Croatia) N Mektić	4	1
(Germany) D Brands (Netherlands) J Huta Galung	6	6^{5}	[10]
3	(Italy) A di Mauro (Italy) S Vagnozzi	3	7^{7}	[3]
(Poland) M Kowalczyk (Czech Republic) D Lojda	6	6
(Spain) I Cervantes Huegun (Spain) G Olaso	2	3
WC	(Spain) O Burrieza-LÓpez (Spain) S Pérez-Pérez	3	4
2	(United Kingdom) J Marray (Slovakia) I Zelenay	6	6

Quarterfinals
1	(Sweden) J Brunström (Belgium) D Norman	4	7	[10]
(Spain) J Martí (Spain) D Muñoz-de la Nava	6	5	[5]
4	(Italy) A Motti (Czech Republic) D Škoch	3	2
(Slovenia) A Bedene (Serbia) M Zekic	6	6
(Italy) D Bracciali (Italy) A Giannessi	1	6	[5]
(Germany) D Brands (Netherlands) J Huta Galung	6	3	[10]
(Poland) M Kowalczyk (Czech Republic) D Lojda	1	3
2	(United Kingdom) J Marray (Slovakia) I Zelenay	6	6

Semifinals
1	(Sweden) J Brunström (Belgium) D Norman	7	6
(Slovenia) A Bedene (Serbia) M Zekic	5	4
(Germany) D Brands (Netherlands) J Huta Galung	3	4
2	(United Kingdom) J Marray (Slovakia) I Zelenay	6	6

Final
1	(Sweden) J Brunström (Belgium) D Norman	6	7
2	(United Kingdom) J Marray (Slovakia) I Zelenay	4	5
