= 2026 Open Città della Disfida – Singles =

Singles
- 2026 Open Città della Disfida

Final
- Champion: (Austria) Lukas Neumayer
- Runner-up: (Italy) Michele Ribecai
- Score: 2–6, 6–3, 6–3

Events
Singles	Doubles
- Open Città della Disfida

Dalibor Svrčina was the defending champion but withdrew from the tournament before his first round match.

Lukas Neumayer won the title after defeating Michele Ribecai 2–6, 6–3, 6–3 in the final.

== Seeds ==
1. (Czech Republic) Dalibor Svrčina (withdrew)
2. (France) Ugo Blanchet (second round)
3. (United Kingdom) Toby Samuel (second round)
4. (Estonia) Daniil Glinka (second round)
5. (Ukraine) Vitaliy Sachko (semifinals)
6. (Italy) Marco Cecchinato (second round)
7. (Italy) Lorenzo Giustino (second round)
8. (Switzerland) Rémy Bertola (second round)

== Draw ==
Key

- Q = Qualifier
- WC = Wild card
- LL = Lucky loser
- Alt = Alternate
- ITF = ITF entry
- PR = Protected ranking
- SR = Special ranking
- SE = Special exempt
- JE = Junior exempt
- JR = Junior Accelerator Programme entrant
- CO = College Accelerator Programme entrant
- NG = Next Gen Accelerator Program entrant
- w/o = Walkover
- r = Retired
- d = Defaulted

=== Finals ===
Semifinals
LL	(Italy) Michele Ribecai	7	7
5	(Ukraine) Vitaliy Sachko	5	5
(Austria) Lukas Neumayer	6	3
(United Kingdom) Felix Gill	3	1^{r}

Final
LL	(Italy) Michele Ribecai	6	3	3
(Austria) Lukas Neumayer	2	6	6

=== Top half ===
First round
LL	(Italy) M Ribecai	6	6
(Italy) J Berrettini	1	2
Q	(Italy) A Guerrieri	3	6	6
Alt	(Poland) M Kaśnikowski	6	3	4
(Germany) H Squire	4	3
SE	(Croatia) M Poljičak	6	6
Q	(France) L Lokoli	3	4
7	(Italy) L Giustino	6	6
4	(Estonia) D Glinka	6	6
(Kazakhstan) M Kukushkin	3	3
(Belgium) GA Bailly	1	5
(Belgium) K Coppejans	6	7
(Bosnia and Herzegovina) N Fatić	7^{7}	6
WC	(Italy) F Bondioli	6^{1}	3
Q	(Italy) F Forti	2	1
5	(Ukraine) V Sachko	6	6

Second round
LL	(Italy) M Ribecai	6	6
Q	(Italy) A Guerrieri	2	4
SE	(Croatia) M Poljičak	6	3	6
7	(Italy) L Giustino	2	6	2
4	(Estonia) D Glinka	5	4
(Belgium) K Coppejans	7	6
(Bosnia and Herzegovina) N Fatić	3	6^{1}
5	(Ukraine) V Sachko	6	7^{7}

Quarterfinals
LL	(Italy) M Ribecai	6	3
SE	(Croatia) M Poljičak	1	0^{r}
(Belgium) K Coppejans	4	7	3
5	(Ukraine) V Sachko	6	5	6

Semifinals
LL	(Italy) M Ribecai	7	7
5	(Ukraine) V Sachko	5	5

=== Bottom half ===
First round
8	(Switzerland) R Bertola	6	6
(Germany) T Gentzsch	1	3
WC	(Italy) E Dalla Valle	4	6	7^{7}
Q	(France) M Chazal	6	3	6^{4}
Alt	(Croatia) D Ajduković	3	3
(Austria) L Neumayer	6	6
(India) S Nagal	1	6^{3}
3	(United Kingdom) T Samuel	6	7^{7}
6	(Italy) M Cecchinato	7	6
WC	(Italy) F Romano	5	1
(United Kingdom) F Gill	6	6
(Italy) G Cadenasso	4	2
(Czech Republic) M Mrva	6	2	1
Q	(Czech Republic) M Krumich	3	6	6
Q	(India) M Dhamne	7	3	2
2	(France) U Blanchet	5	6	6

Second round
8	(Switzerland) R Bertola	5	1
WC	(Italy) E Dalla Valle	7	6
(Austria) L Neumayer	6	6
3	(United Kingdom) T Samuel	3	2
6	(Italy) M Cecchinato	6^{2}	2
(United Kingdom) F Gill	7^{7}	6
Q	(Czech Republic) M Krumich	7	6
2	(France) U Blanchet	5	3

Quarterfinals
WC	(Italy) E Dalla Valle	1	1
(Austria) L Neumayer	6	6
(United Kingdom) F Gill	7^{7}	0	6
Q	(Czech Republic) M Krumich	6^{5}	6	3

Semifinals
(Austria) L Neumayer	6	3
(United Kingdom) F Gill	3	1^{r}
