= 2012 Open Barletta Trofeo Dimiccoli & Boraccino – Singles =

Singles
- 2012 Open Barletta Trofeo Dimiccoli & Boraccino

Final
- Champion: (Slovenia) Aljaž Bedene
- Runner-up: (Italy) Potito Starace
- Score: 6–2, 6–0

Events
Singles	Doubles
← 2011 ·	Open Barletta Trofeo Dimiccoli & Boraccino	· 2016 →

Aljaž Bedene defended his title by defeating Potito Starace 6–2, 6–0 in the final.

== Seeds ==
1. (Italy) Fabio Fognini (second round)
2. (Italy) Filippo Volandri (semifinals)
3. (Italy) Potito Starace (final)
4. (Spain) Pere Riba (first round)
5. (Tunisia) Malek Jaziri (semifinals)
6. (Romania) Victor Hănescu (quarterfinals)
7. (Italy) Simone Bolelli (first round)
8. (Germany) Daniel Brands (quarterfinals)

== Draw ==
=== Key ===
- Q = Qualifier
- WC = Wild card
- LL = Lucky loser
- Alt = Alternate
- SE = Special exempt
- PR = Protected ranking
- ITF = ITF entry
- JE = Junior exempt
- w/o = Walkover
- r = Retired
- d = Defaulted
- SR = Special ranking

=== Finals ===
Semifinals
5	(Tunisia) Malek Jaziri	6	3	6^{0}
(Slovenia) Aljaž Bedene	3	6	7^{7}
3	(Italy) Potito Starace	7^{7}	6
2	(Italy) Filippo Volandri	6^{3}	4

Final
(Slovenia) Aljaž Bedene	6	6
3	(Italy) Potito Starace	2	0

=== Top half ===
First round
1/WC	(Italy) F Fognini	2	6	6
Q	(Serbia) F Krajinović	6	2	4
Q	(Italy) Giammarco Micolani	1	4
(Netherlands) M Middelkoop	6	6
Q	(Croatia) N Mektić	6	3	2
(Italy) Andrea Arnaboldi	3	6	6
(Italy) A di Mauro	4	3
5	(Tunisia) M Jaziri	6	6
4	(Spain) P Riba	2	3
WC	(Italy) Enrico Burzi	6	6
(Germany) Jan-Lennard Struff	2	6^{4}
(Italy) S Galvani	6	7^{7}
(Spain) G Olaso	1	6	6
(Spain) I Cervantes Huegun	6	2	2
(Slovenia) A Bedene	6	7^{7}
7/WC	(Italy) S Bolelli	3	6^{5}

Second round
1/WC	(Italy) F Fognini	5	6	2
(Netherlands) M Middelkoop	7	3	6
(Italy) Andrea Arnaboldi	4	2
5	(Tunisia) M Jaziri	6	6
WC	(Italy) Enrico Burzi	6
(Italy) S Galvani	4	r
(Spain) G Olaso	6	4	0
(Slovenia) A Bedene	2	6	6

Quarterfinals
(Netherlands) M Middelkoop	1	3
5	(Tunisia) M Jaziri	6	6
WC	(Italy) Enrico Burzi	1	7^{7}	3
(Slovenia) A Bedene	6	6^{1}	6

Semifinals
5	(Tunisia) M Jaziri	6	3	6^{0}
(Slovenia) A Bedene	3	6	7^{7}

=== Bottom half ===
First round
6	(Romania) V Hănescu	6	7^{7}
(Italy) S Vagnozzi	3	6^{3}
(Netherlands) J Huta Galung	7	7
(Czech Republic) D Lojda	5	5
Q	(Serbia) Denis Bejtulahi	4	2
(Spain) D Muñoz-de la Nava	6	6
(Spain) J Martí	2	6	3
3	(Italy) P Starace	6	3	6
8	(Germany) D Brands	5	6	6
(Portugal) P Sousa	7	3	4
(Germany) D Brown	6	6
(Italy) A Giannessi	1	4
(Serbia) M Zekic	6	6
WC	(Czech Republic) Michal Schmid	2	3
(Spain) R Bautista-Agut	5	4
2	(Italy) F Volandri	7	6

Second round
6	(Romania) V Hănescu	6	6
(Netherlands) J Huta Galung	3	2
(Spain) D Muñoz-de la Nava	4	3
3	(Italy) P Starace	6	6
8	(Germany) D Brands	4	6	6
(Germany) D Brown	6	3	0
(Serbia) M Zekic	4	3
2	(Italy) F Volandri	6	6

Quarterfinals
6	(Romania) V Hănescu	5	2
3	(Italy) P Starace	7	6
8	(Germany) D Brands	3	5
2	(Italy) F Volandri	6	7

Semifinals
3	(Italy) P Starace	7^{7}	6
2	(Italy) F Volandri	6^{3}	4
