= 2026 Open Città della Disfida – Doubles =

Doubles
- 2026 Open Città della Disfida

Final
- Champions: (Czech Republic) Filip Duda (Serbia) Stefan Latinović
- Runners-up: (Slovakia) Miloš Karol (Ukraine) Vitaliy Sachko
- Score: 7–6^{(7–4)}, 6–7^{(6–8)}, [13–11]

Events
Singles	Doubles
- Open Città della Disfida

Alexander Merino and Christoph Negritu were the defending champions but chose not to defend their title.

Filip Duda and Stefan Latinović won the title after defeating Miloš Karol and Vitaliy Sachko 7–6^{(7–4)}, 6–7^{(6–8)}, [13–11] in the final.

== Seeds ==
1. (Czech Republic) Filip Duda / (Serbia) Stefan Latinović (champions)
2. (Slovakia) Miloš Karol / (Ukraine) Vitaliy Sachko (final)
3. (Netherlands) Jarno Jans / (Czech Republic) David Poljak (semifinals)
4. (Germany) Tim Rühl / (Germany) Kai Wehnelt (quarterfinals)

== Draw ==
Key

- Q = Qualifier
- WC = Wild card
- LL = Lucky loser
- Alt = Alternate
- ITF = ITF entry
- PR = Protected ranking
- SR = Special ranking
- SE = Special exempt
- JE = Junior exempt
- JR = Junior Accelerator Programme entrant
- CO = College Accelerator Programme entrant
- NG = Next Gen Accelerator Program entrant
- w/o = Walkover
- r = Retired
- d = Defaulted

First round
1	(Czech Republic) F Duda (Serbia) S Latinović	6^{5}	7^{7}	[10]
(United Kingdom) F Bass (Bulgaria) A Genov	7^{7}	6^{5}	[8]
(Spain) Ignasi Forcano (Netherlands) M Vervoort	3	4
(United Kingdom) F Gill (United Kingdom) T Samuel	6	6
3	(Netherlands) J Jans (Czech Republic) D Poljak	6	6
(Switzerland) R Bertola (Italy) G Ricca	0	2
(Italy) Simone Agostini (Italy) Lorenzo Carboni	6	6
(Italy) M Ribecai (Italy) J Vasamì	2	4
WC	(Italy) Pietro Fellin (Italy) F Moroni	3	6	[10]
(United Kingdom) T Hands (Germany) Niklas Schell	6	3	[7]
(Czech Republic) M Krumich (Czech Republic) D Svrčina
4	(Germany) T Rühl (Germany) K Wehnelt	w/o
(Bosnia and Herzegovina) M Bašić (Bosnia and Herzegovina) N Fatić	4	2
(Croatia) D Ajduković (Croatia) A Kalender	6	6
(Italy) F Forti (Italy) F Romano	1	6^{3}
2	(Slovakia) M Karol (Ukraine) V Sachko	6	7^{7}

Quarterfinals
1	(Czech Republic) F Duda (Serbia) S Latinović	w/o
(United Kingdom) F Gill (United Kingdom) T Samuel
3	(Netherlands) J Jans (Czech Republic) D Poljak	3	6	[10]
(Italy) S Agostini (Italy) L Carboni	6	4	[3]
WC	(Italy) P Fellin (Italy) F Moroni	1	6	[10]
4	(Germany) T Rühl (Germany) K Wehnelt	6	4	[1]
(Croatia) D Ajduković (Croatia) A Kalender	4	3
2	(Slovakia) M Karol (Ukraine) V Sachko	6	6

Semifinals
1	(Czech Republic) F Duda (Serbia) S Latinović	6	6
3	(Netherlands) J Jans (Czech Republic) D Poljak	3	2
WC	(Italy) P Fellin (Italy) F Moroni	6^{5}	4
2	(Slovakia) M Karol (Ukraine) V Sachko	7^{7}	6

Final
1	(Czech Republic) F Duda (Serbia) S Latinović	7^{7}	6^{6}	[13]
2	(Slovakia) M Karol (Ukraine) V Sachko	6^{4}	7^{8}	[11]
