= 2023 Open Città della Disfida – Doubles =

Doubles
- 2023 Open Città della Disfida

Final
- Champions: (Italy) Jacopo Berrettini (Italy) Flavio Cobolli
- Runners-up: (Czech Republic) Zdeněk Kolář (Ukraine) Denys Molchanov
- Score: 1–6, 7–5, [10–6]

Events
| Singles | Doubles |
- Open Città della Disfida

Evgeny Karlovskiy and Evgenii Tiurnev were the defending champions but chose not to defend their title.

Jacopo Berrettini and Flavio Cobolli won the title after defeating Zdeněk Kolář and Denys Molchanov 1–6, 7–5, [10–6] in the final.

== Seeds ==
1. (Poland) Karol Drzewiecki / (Poland) Szymon Walków (first round)
2. (Czech Republic) Zdeněk Kolář / (Ukraine) Denys Molchanov (final)
3. Ivan Liutarevich / (Ukraine) Vladyslav Manafov (quarterfinals)
4. (Germany) Constantin Frantzen / (United Kingdom) Luke Johnson (quarterfinals)

== Draw ==
Key

- Q = Qualifier
- WC = Wild card
- LL = Lucky loser
- Alt = Alternate
- ITF = ITF entry
- PR = Protected ranking
- SR = Special ranking
- SE = Special exempt
- JE = Junior exempt
- JR = Junior Accelerator Programme entrant
- CO = College Accelerator Programme entrant
- NG = Next Gen Accelerator Program entrant
- w/o = Walkover
- r = Retired
- d = Defaulted

First round
1 | (Poland) K Drzewiecki (Poland) S Walków | 6 | 1 | [10]
WC | (Italy) J Berrettini (Italy) F Cobolli | 3 | 6 | [12]
(Peru) A Merino (Switzerland) J Paul | 6 | 7^{9}
(Turkey) E Kırkın (Slovakia) I Zelenay | 3 | 6^{7}
3 | I Liutarevich (Ukraine) V Manafov | 6 | 6
PR | (Italy) J Ocleppo (Germany) K Wehnelt | 3 | 3
(Greece) M Kalovelonis (Australia) J Taylor | 3 | 4
(Romania) FC Jianu (Serbia) M Zekić | 6 | 6
Alt | (Canada) S Diez (Romania) ND Ionel | 6 | 5 | [10]
Alt | (Poland) M Kaśnikowski (Australia) J McCabe | 1 | 7 | [4]
(Argentina) M Navone (Argentina) JB Torres | 3 | 5
4 | (Germany) C Frantzen (United Kingdom) L Johnson | 6 | 7
(Italy) M Gigante (Italy) F Maestrelli | 2 | 6 | [10]
(Italy) A Pellegrino (Argentina) S Rodríguez Taverna | 6 | 4 | [5]
(Croatia) Z Babić (Poland) P Matuszewski | 4 | 3
2 | (Czech Republic) Z Kolář (Ukraine) D Molchanov | 6 | 6

Quarterfinals
WC | (Italy) J Berrettini (Italy) F Cobolli | 6 | 6
(Peru) A Merino (Switzerland) J Paul | 3 | 3
3 | I Liutarevich (Ukraine) V Manafov | 6^{1} | 6^{4}
(Romania) FC Jianu (Serbia) M Zekić | 7^{7} | 7^{7}
Alt | (Canada) S Diez (Romania) ND Ionel | 6 | 6
4 | (Germany) C Frantzen (United Kingdom) L Johnson | 4 | 4
(Italy) M Gigante (Italy) F Maestrelli
2 | (Czech Republic) Z Kolář (Ukraine) D Molchanov | w/o

Semifinals
WC | (Italy) J Berrettini (Italy) F Cobolli | 6 | 6
(Romania) FC Jianu (Serbia) M Zekić | 3 | 3
Alt | (Canada) S Diez (Romania) ND Ionel | 3 | 4
2 | (Czech Republic) Z Kolář (Ukraine) D Molchanov | 6 | 6

Final
WC | (Italy) J Berrettini (Italy) F Cobolli | 1 | 7 | [10]
2 | (Czech Republic) Z Kolář (Ukraine) D Molchanov | 6 | 5 | [6]
