= 2016 Open Città della Disfida – Singles =

Singles
- 2016 Open Città della Disfida

Final
- Champion: (Sweden) Elias Ymer
- Runner-up: (Czech Republic) Adam Pavlásek
- Score: 7–5, 6–4

Events
Singles	Doubles
← 2012 ·	Open Città della Disfida	· 2017 →

Aljaž Bedene was the defending champion but chose not to participate.

Elias Ymer won the title, defeating Adam Pavlásek 7–5, 6–4 in the final.

== Seeds ==
1. (Brazil) Rogério Dutra Silva (quarterfinals)
2. (Spain) Roberto Carballés Baena (second round)
3. (Czech Republic) Adam Pavlásek (final)
4. (Portugal) Gastão Elias (quarterfinals)
5. (Slovakia) Andrej Martin (second round)
6. (Netherlands) Igor Sijsling (first round)
7. (Italy) Luca Vanni (first round)
8. (Sweden) Elias Ymer (champion)

== Draw ==
=== Key ===
- Q = Qualifier
- WC = Wild card
- LL = Lucky loser
- Alt = Alternate
- SE = Special exempt
- PR = Protected ranking
- ITF = ITF entry
- JE = Junior exempt
- w/o = Walkover
- r = Retired
- d = Defaulted
- SR = Special ranking

=== Finals ===
Semifinals
(Estonia) Jürgen Zopp	2	4
8	(Sweden) Elias Ymer	6	6
3	(Czech Republic) Adam Pavlásek	6	6
Q	(Spain) Enrique López-Pérez	1	3

Final
8	(Sweden) Elias Ymer	7	6
3	(Czech Republic) Adam Pavlásek	5	4

=== Top half ===
First round
1	(Brazil) R Dutra Silva	6	6
(Kazakhstan) A Golubev	4	2
(Argentina) M González	6	6
WC	(Italy) F Gaio	0	4
LL	(Russia) A Vatutin	6	4	7
WC	(France) J Benneteau	2	6	5
(Estonia) J Zopp	6	4	7^{7}
7	(Italy) L Vanni	4	6	6^{4}
4	(Portugal) G Elias	6	6
Q	(Germany) P Torebko	1	0
PR	(Germany) J Reister	6	6
(India) R Ramanathan	0	3
(Italy) G Naso	0	6	6
(Chile) H Podlipnik	6	4	2
(Japan) H Moriya	1	1
8	(Sweden) E Ymer	6	6

Second round
1	(Brazil) R Dutra Silva	6	6
(Argentina) M González	4	2
LL	(Russia) A Vatutin	7	3	5
(Estonia) J Zopp	5	6	7
4	(Portugal) G Elias	6	6^{2}	6
PR	(Germany) J Reister	2	7^{7}	3
(Italy) G Naso	6^{4}	3
8	(Sweden) E Ymer	7^{7}	6

Quarterfinals
1	(Brazil) R Dutra Silva	6^{5}	4
(Estonia) J Zopp	7^{7}	6
4	(Portugal) G Elias	6	3	4
8	(Sweden) E Ymer	4	6	6

Semifinals
(Estonia) J Zopp	2	4
8	(Sweden) E Ymer	6	6

=== Bottom half ===
First round
5	(Slovakia) A Martin	6	7^{7}
(Russia) A Karatsev	4	6^{2}
Q	(Italy) L Sonego	6	2	6
Q	(Bulgaria) D Kuzmanov	4	6	2
(Hungary) M Fucsovics	5	7^{8}	6
(Italy) M Donati	7	6^{6}	4
(Italy) A Arnaboldi	5	0^{r}
3	(Czech Republic) A Pavlásek	7	3
6	(Netherlands) I Sijsling	7^{8}	4	4
WC	(Italy) Edoardo Eremin	6^{6}	6	6
Q	(Spain) E López-Pérez	6	6
(Serbia) L Djere	3	3
WC	(Italy) G Mager	4	6^{13}
(Italy) A Giannessi	6	7^{15}
(Belarus) U Ignatik	6	4	1
2	(Spain) R Carballés Baena	3	6	6

Second round
5	(Slovakia) A Martin	2	4
Q	(Italy) L Sonego	6	6
(Hungary) M Fucsovics	7	4	3
3	(Czech Republic) A Pavlásek	5	6	6
WC	(Italy) E Eremin	2	2
Q	(Spain) E López-Pérez	6	6
(Italy) A Giannessi	5	6	6
2	(Spain) R Carballés Baena	7	4	4

Quarterfinals
Q	(Italy) L Sonego	2	0
3	(Czech Republic) A Pavlásek	6	6
Q	(Spain) E López-Pérez	6	6
(Italy) A Giannessi	3	3

Semifinals
3	(Czech Republic) A Pavlásek	6	6
Q	(Spain) E López-Pérez	1	3
