= 2022 Open Città della Disfida =

- Date: 11–17 April
- Edition: 22nd
- Surface: Clay
- Location: Barletta, Italy

Champions

Singles
- (Portugal) Nuno Borges

Doubles
- Evgeny Karlovskiy / Evgenii Tiurnev
← 2021 ·	Open Città della Disfida	· 2023 →

The 2022 Open Città della Disfida was a professional tennis tournament played on clay courts. It was the 22nd edition of the tournament which was part of the 2022 ATP Challenger Tour. It took place in Barletta, Italy between 11 and 17 April 2022.

== Singles main-draw entrants ==
=== Seeds ===
Country	Player	Rank^{1}	Seed
FRA	Gilles Simon	136	1
POR	Nuno Borges	143	2
CZE	Zdeněk Kolář	150	3
AUT	Jurij Rodionov	162	4
ITA	Franco Agamenone	167	5
FRA	Enzo Couacaud	179	6
FRA	Constant Lestienne	188	7
POL	Kacper Żuk	189	8

- ^{1} Rankings are as of 4 April 2022.

=== Other entrants ===
The following players received wildcards into the singles main draw:

- (Italy) Luca Nardi
- (Ukraine) Oleksandr Ovcharenko
- (Italy) Francesco Passaro

The following players received entry into the singles main draw as alternates:

- Evgeny Karlovskiy
- (Netherlands) Jelle Sels
- Alexander Shevchenko

The following players received entry from the qualifying draw:

- (Italy) Matteo Arnaldi
- (Italy) Luciano Darderi
- (France) Titouan Droguet
- (Italy) Francesco Forti
- (Germany) Lucas Gerch
- (Serbia) Miljan Zekić

== Champions ==
=== Singles ===
- (Portugal) Nuno Borges def. (Serbia) Miljan Zekić 6–3, 7–5.

=== Doubles ===
- Evgeny Karlovskiy / Evgenii Tiurnev def. (Japan) Ben McLachlan / (Poland) Szymon Walków 6–3, 6–4.
