= 2018 Open Città della Disfida =

- Date: 9–15 April
- Edition: 19th
- Surface: Clay
- Location: Barletta, Italy

Champions

Singles
- (Argentina) Marco Trungelliti

Doubles
- (Ukraine) Denys Molchanov / (Slovakia) Igor Zelenay
← 2017 ·	Open Città della Disfida	· 2019 →

The 2018 Open Città della Disfida was a professional tennis tournament played on clay courts. It was the 19th edition of the tournament which was part of the 2018 ATP Challenger Tour. It took place in Barletta, Italy between 9 and 15 April 2018.

== Singles main-draw entrants ==
=== Seeds ===
Country	Player	Rank^{1}	Seed
ITA	Marco Cecchinato	99	1
POR	Gastão Elias	106	2
ITA	Stefano Travaglia	109	3
POR	Pedro Sousa	117	4
GER	Yannick Maden	128	5
SVK	Martin Kližan	130	6
ESP	Marcel Granollers	137	7
~~SVK~~	~~Jozef Kovalík~~	~~138~~	~~8~~
ITA	Lorenzo Sonego	158	9

- ^{1} Rankings are as of 2 April 2018.

=== Other entrants ===
The following players received wildcards into the singles main draw:

- (Italy) Matteo Donati
- (Italy) Gian Marco Moroni
- (Italy) Andrea Pellegrino

The following players received entry from the qualifying draw:

- (Belgium) Kimmer Coppejans
- (Spain) Daniel Gimeno Traver
- (Hungary) Zsombor Piros
- (Argentina) Marco Trungelliti

The following players received entry as lucky losers:

- (France) Maxime Chazal
- (Germany) Oscar Otte
- (Serbia) Marko Tepavac

== Champions ==
=== Singles ===
- (Argentina) Marco Trungelliti def. (Italy) Simone Bolelli 2–6, 7–6^{(7–4)}, 6–4.

=== Doubles ===
- (Ukraine) Denys Molchanov / (Slovakia) Igor Zelenay def. (Uruguay) Ariel Behar / (Argentina) Máximo González 6–1, 6–2.
