= 2017 Open Città della Disfida =

- Date: 10–16 April
- Edition: 18th
- Surface: Clay
- Location: Barletta, Italy

Champions

Singles
- (United Kingdom) Aljaž Bedene

Doubles
- (Italy) Marco Cecchinato / (Italy) Matteo Donati
← 2016 ·	Open Città della Disfida	· 2018 →

The 2017 Open Città della Disfida is a professional tennis tournament played on clay courts. It is the 18th edition of the tournament to be part of the 2017 ATP Challenger Tour. It took place in Barletta, Italy between 10 and 16 April 2017.

== Point distribution ==
Event	W	F	SF	QF	Round of 16	Round of 32	Q	Q2
Singles	80	48	29	15	7	0	3	0
Doubles	80	48	29	15	0	—	—	—

== Singles main-draw entrants ==
=== Seeds ===
Country	Player	Rank^{1}	Seed
POR	Gastão Elias	90	1
GBR	Aljaž Bedene	93	2
SVK	Norbert Gombos	115	3
ITA	Alessandro Giannessi	122	4
BEL	Arthur De Greef	125	5
SVK	Jozef Kovalík	127	6
GER	Maximilian Marterer	133	7
SWE	Elias Ymer	154	8

- ^{1} Rankings are as of April 3, 2017.

=== Other entrants ===
The following players received wildcards into the singles main draw:

- (Italy) Matteo Berrettini
- (Italy) Matteo Donati
- (Italy) Andrea Pellegrino
- (Czech Republic) Lukáš Rosol

The following player received entry into the singles main draw as a special exempt:

- (Slovakia) Jozef Kovalík

The following player received entry into the singles main draw as an alternate:

- (Belgium) Kimmer Coppejans

The following players received entry from the qualifying draw:

- (Germany) Jeremy Jahn
- (Serbia) Filip Krajinović
- (Italy) Lorenzo Sonego
- (Italy) Stefano Travaglia

== Champions ==
=== Singles ===
- (United Kingdom) Aljaž Bedene def. (Portugal) Gastão Elias, 7–6^{(7–4)}, 6–3.

=== Doubles ===
- (Italy) Marco Cecchinato / (Italy) Matteo Donati def. (Croatia) Marin Draganja / (Croatia) Tomislav Draganja 6–3, 6–4.
