= 2012 Open Barletta Trofeo Dimiccoli & Boraccino =

- Date: 2–8 April
- Edition: 16th
- Surface: Clay
- Location: Barletta, Italy

Champions

Singles
- (Slovenia) Aljaž Bedene

Doubles
- (Sweden) Johan Brunström / (Belgium) Dick Norman
← 2011 ·	Open Barletta Trofeo Dimiccoli & Boraccino	· 2016 →

The 2012 Open Barletta Trofeo Dimiccoli & Boraccino was a professional tennis tournament played on clay courts. It was the 16th edition of the tournament which was part of the 2012 ATP Challenger Tour. It took place in Barletta, Italy between 2 and 8 April 2012.

== Singles main draw entrants ==
=== Seeds ===
Country	Player	Rank^{1}	Seed
ITA	Fabio Fognini	55	1
ITA	Filippo Volandri	58	2
ITA	Potito Starace	70	3
ESP	Pere Riba	87	4
TUN	Malek Jaziri	93	5
ROU	Victor Hănescu	95	6
ITA	Simone Bolelli	109	7
GER	Daniel Brands	131	8

- ^{1} Rankings are as of March 19, 2012.

=== Other entrants ===
The following players received wildcards into the singles main draw:

- (Italy) Simone Bolelli
- (Italy) Enrico Burzi
- (Italy) Fabio Fognini
- (Czech Republic) Michal Schmid

The following players received entry from the qualifying draw:

- (Serbia) Denis Bejtulahi
- (Serbia) Filip Krajinović
- (Croatia) Nikola Mektić
- (Italy) Giammarco Micolani

== Champions ==
=== Singles ===
- (Slovenia) Aljaž Bedene def. (Italy) Potito Starace, 6–2, 6–0

=== Doubles ===
- (Sweden) Johan Brunström / (Belgium) Dick Norman def. (United Kingdom) Jonathan Marray / (Slovakia) Igor Zelenay, 6–4, 7–5
