= 2018 Open Città della Disfida – Doubles =

Doubles
- 2018 Open Città della Disfida

Final
- Champions: (Ukraine) Denys Molchanov (Slovakia) Igor Zelenay
- Runners-up: (Uruguay) Ariel Behar (Argentina) Máximo González
- Score: 6–1, 6–2

Events
Singles	Doubles
- Open Città della Disfida

Marco Cecchinato and Matteo Donati were the defending champions but only Donati chose to defend his title, partnering Simone Bolelli. Donati lost in the first round to Nikola Milojević and Mohamed Safwat.

Denys Molchanov and Igor Zelenay won the title after defeating Ariel Behar and Máximo González 6–1, 6–2 in the final.

== Seeds ==
1. (Uruguay) Ariel Behar / (Argentina) Máximo González (final)
2. (Argentina) Guido Andreozzi / (France) Jonathan Eysseric (first round)
3. (Ukraine) Denys Molchanov / (Slovakia) Igor Zelenay (champions)
4. (Croatia) Marin Draganja / (Croatia) Tomislav Draganja (first round)

== Draw ==
Key

- Q = Qualifier
- WC = Wild card
- LL = Lucky loser
- Alt = Alternate
- ITF = ITF entry
- PR = Protected ranking
- SR = Special ranking
- SE = Special exempt
- JE = Junior exempt
- JR = Junior Accelerator Programme entrant
- CO = College Accelerator Programme entrant
- NG = Next Gen Accelerator Program entrant
- w/o = Walkover
- r = Retired
- d = Defaulted

First round
1	(Uruguay) A Behar (Argentina) M González	w/o
(Spain) N Kuhn (Ukraine) V Uzhylovskyi
(Italy) S Bolelli (Italy) M Donati	6	4	[5]
(Serbia) N Milojević (Egypt) M Safwat	3	6	[10]
4	(Croatia) M Draganja (Croatia) T Draganja	6	6^{4}	[6]
(Italy) A Motti (Italy) A Vavassori	2	7^{7}	[10]
WC	(Italy) A Guerrieri (Italy) S Travaglia	7	3	[9]
(Portugal) G Oliveira (Netherlands) D Pel	5	6	[11]
WC	(Italy) F Baldi (Italy) A Pellegrino	6	6
(Germany) A Mies (Sweden) A Siljeström	3	4
(France) B Bonzi (Spain) P Toledo Bagué	4	2
3	(Ukraine) D Molchanov (Slovakia) I Zelenay	6	6
(Spain) S Martos Gornés (Netherlands) M Vervoort	7^{9}	6
WC	(Italy) Luca Scelzi (Italy) Giuseppe Tresca	6^{7}	1
(Poland) T Bednarek (Poland) G Panfil	6	3	[11]
2	(Argentina) G Andreozzi (France) J Eysseric	2	6	[9]

Quarterfinals
1	(Uruguay) A Behar (Argentina) M González	6	6
(Serbia) N Milojević (Egypt) M Safwat	1	2
(Italy) A Motti (Italy) A Vavassori	6^{1}	3
(Portugal) G Oliveira (Netherlands) D Pel	7^{7}	6
WC	(Italy) F Baldi (Italy) A Pellegrino	4	4
3	(Ukraine) D Molchanov (Slovakia) I Zelenay	6	6
(Spain) S Martos Gornés (Netherlands) M Vervoort	6	1	[10]
(Poland) T Bednarek (Poland) G Panfil	4	6	[8]

Semifinals
1	(Uruguay) A Behar (Argentina) M González	7^{7}	6
(Portugal) G Oliveira (Netherlands) D Pel	6^{5}	4
3	(Ukraine) D Molchanov (Slovakia) I Zelenay	6	7^{9}
(Spain) S Martos Gornés (Netherlands) M Vervoort	2	6^{7}

Final
1	(Uruguay) A Behar (Argentina) M González	1	2
3	(Ukraine) D Molchanov (Slovakia) I Zelenay	6	6
