= 2018 Open Città della Disfida – Singles =

Singles
- 2018 Open Città della Disfida

Final
- Champion: (Argentina) Marco Trungelliti
- Runner-up: (Italy) Simone Bolelli
- Score: 2–6, 7–6^{(7–4)}, 6–4

Events
Singles	Doubles
- Open Città della Disfida

Aljaž Bedene was the defending champion but chose not to defend his title.

Marco Trungelliti won the title after defeating Simone Bolelli 2–6, 7–6^{(7–4)}, 6–4 in the final.

== Seeds ==
1. (Italy) Marco Cecchinato (first round)
2. (Portugal) Gastão Elias (second round)
3. (Italy) Stefano Travaglia (first round)
4. (Portugal) Pedro Sousa (first round)
5. (Germany) Yannick Maden (second round)
6. (Slovakia) Martin Kližan (second round, retired)
7. (Spain) Marcel Granollers (first round, retired)
8. (Slovakia) Jozef Kovalík (withdrew)
9. (Italy) Lorenzo Sonego (second round)

== Draw ==
Key

- Q = Qualifier
- WC = Wild card
- LL = Lucky loser
- Alt = Alternate
- ITF = ITF entry
- PR = Protected ranking
- SR = Special ranking
- SE = Special exempt
- JE = Junior exempt
- JR = Junior Accelerator Programme entrant
- CO = College Accelerator Programme entrant
- NG = Next Gen Accelerator Program entrant
- w/o = Walkover
- r = Retired
- d = Defaulted

=== Finals ===
Semifinals
(Spain) Jaume Munar	6^{3}	1
Q	(Argentina) Marco Trungelliti	7^{7}	6
WC	(Italy) Gian Marco Moroni	4	2
(Italy) Simone Bolelli	6	6

Final
Q	(Argentina) Marco Trungelliti	2	7^{7}	6
(Italy) Simone Bolelli	6	6^{4}	4

=== Top half ===
First round
1	(Italy) M Cecchinato	3	5
(Serbia) N Milojević	6	7
(Spain) J Munar	7^{7}	4	7
(Canada) F Auger-Aliassime	6^{4}	6	5
WC	(Italy) M Donati	2	6	6
(Argentina) G Andreozzi	6	3	4
(France) B Bonzi	2	0
5	(Germany) Y Maden	6	6
3	(Italy) S Travaglia	4	4
Q	(Argentina) M Trungelliti	6	6
Q	(Hungary) Z Piros	2	1
(Italy) A Giannessi	6	6
(India) S Nagal	6	3	2
(Portugal) G Oliveira	4	6	6
(Spain) N Kuhn	6
7	(Spain) M Granollers	5^{r}

Second round
(Serbia) N Milojević	5	1
(Spain) J Munar	7	6
WC	(Italy) M Donati	6	6
5	(Germany) Y Maden	2	4
Q	(Argentina) M Trungelliti	6	2
(Italy) A Giannessi	3	0^{r}
(Portugal) G Oliveira	4	0
(Spain) N Kuhn	6	2^{r}

Quarterfinals
(Spain) J Munar	6	7^{7}
WC	(Italy) M Donati	4	6^{5}
Q	(Argentina) M Trungelliti	6	6
(Portugal) G Oliveira	1	3

Semifinals
(Spain) J Munar	6^{3}	1
Q	(Argentina) M Trungelliti	7^{7}	6

=== Bottom half ===
First round
6	(Slovakia) M Kližan	6	6
Q	(Belgium) K Coppejans	4	0
Q	(Spain) D Gimeno Traver	6	7^{7}
LL	(France) M Chazal	2	6^{4}
(Czech Republic) A Pavlásek	6	6^{3}	6^{6}
WC	(Italy) A Pellegrino	3	7^{7}	7^{8}
WC	(Italy) GM Moroni	6	6
4	(Portugal) P Sousa	1	4
9	(Italy) L Sonego	6	6
(Portugal) J Domingues	2	4
LL	(Germany) O Otte	7^{7}	4	1
(Italy) S Bolelli	6^{1}	6	6
(Croatia) V Galović	4	6	6
(Egypt) M Safwat	6	3	2
LL	(Serbia) M Tepavac	6	5	0
2	(Portugal) G Elias	3	7	6

Second round
6	(Slovakia) M Kližan	4	1^{r}
Q	(Spain) D Gimeno Traver	6	4
WC	(Italy) A Pellegrino	4	6	1
WC	(Italy) GM Moroni	6	4	6
9	(Italy) L Sonego	5	3
(Italy) S Bolelli	7	6
(Croatia) V Galović	6	6
2	(Portugal) G Elias	1	2

Quarterfinals
Q	(Spain) D Gimeno Traver	3	4
WC	(Italy) GM Moroni	6	6
(Italy) S Bolelli	6	1
(Croatia) V Galović	2	0^{r}

Semifinals
WC	(Italy) GM Moroni	4	2
(Italy) S Bolelli	6	6
