= 2026 Open Città della Disfida =

- Date: 30 March – 5 April
- Edition: 26th
- Surface: Clay
- Location: Barletta, Italy

Champions

Singles
- (Austria) Lukas Neumayer

Doubles
- (Czech Republic) Filip Duda / (Serbia) Stefan Latinović
- Open Città della Disfida

The 2026 Open Città della Disfida Trofeo Lapietra was a professional tennis tournament played on clay courts. It was the 26th edition of the tournament which was part of the 2026 ATP Challenger Tour. It took place in Barletta, Italy between 30 March and 5 April 2026.

== Singles main-draw entrants ==
=== Seeds ===
Country	Player	Rank^{1}	Seed
~~CZE~~	~~Dalibor Svrčina~~	~~100~~	~~1~~
FRA	Ugo Blanchet	154	2
GBR	Toby Samuel	171	3
EST	Daniil Glinka	184	4
UKR	Vitaliy Sachko	186	5
ITA	Marco Cecchinato	199	6
ITA	Lorenzo Giustino	202	7
SUI	Rémy Bertola	210	8

- ^{1} Rankings are as of 16 March 2026.

=== Other entrants ===
The following players received wildcards into the singles main draw:

- (Italy) Federico Bondioli
- (Italy) Enrico Dalla Valle
- (Italy) Filippo Romano

The following player received entry into the singles main draw as a special exempt:

- (Croatia) Mili Poljičak

The following players received entry into the singles main draw as alternates:

- (Croatia) Duje Ajduković
- (Poland) Maks Kaśnikowski

The following players received entry from the qualifying draw:

- (France) Maxime Chazal
- (India) Manas Dhamne
- (Italy) Francesco Forti
- (Italy) Andrea Guerrieri
- (Czech Republic) Martin Krumich
- (France) Laurent Lokoli

The following player received entry as a lucky loser:

- (Italy) Michele Ribecai

== Champions ==
=== Singles ===
- (Austria) Lukas Neumayer def. (Italy) Michele Ribecai 2–6, 6–3, 6–3.

=== Doubles ===
- (Czech Republic) Filip Duda / (Serbia) Stefan Latinović def. (Slovakia) Miloš Karol / (Ukraine) Vitaliy Sachko 7–6^{(7–4)}, 6–7^{(6–8)}, [13–11].
