= 2016 Open Città della Disfida =

- Date: 11–17 April
- Edition: 17th
- Surface: Clay
- Location: Barletta, Italy

Champions

Singles
- (Sweden) Elias Ymer

Doubles
- (Sweden) Johan Brunström / (Sweden) Andreas Siljeström
← 2012 ·	Open Città della Disfida	· 2017 →

The 2016 Open Città della Disfida was a professional tennis tournament played on clay courts. It was the 17th edition of the tournament which was part of the 2016 ATP Challenger Tour. It took place in Barletta, Italy between 11 and 17 April 2016.

== Singles main-draw entrants ==
=== Seeds ===
Country	Player	Rank^{1}	Seed
BRA	Rogério Dutra Silva	103	1
ESP	Roberto Carballés Baena	116	2
CZE	Adam Pavlásek	119	3
POR	Gastão Elias	122	4
SVK	Andrej Martin	129	5
NED	Igor Sijsling	132	6
ITA	Luca Vanni	140	7
SWE	Elias Ymer	144	8

- ^{1} Rankings are as of April 4, 2016.

=== Other entrants ===
The following players received wildcards into the singles main draw:

- (France) Julien Benneteau
- (Italy) Edoardo Eremin
- (Italy) Federico Gaio
- (Italy) Gianluca Mager

The following player received entry into the singles main draw with a protected ranking:

- (Germany) Julian Reister

The following players received entry from the qualifying draw:

- (Spain) Enrique López Pérez
- (Bulgaria) Dimitar Kuzmanov
- (Italy) Lorenzo Sonego
- (Germany) Peter Torebko

The following player received entry as a lucky loser:

- (Russia) Alexey Vatutin

== Champions ==
=== Singles ===
- (Sweden) Elias Ymer def. (Czech Republic) Adam Pavlásek, 7–5, 6–4

=== Doubles ===
- (Sweden) Johan Brunström / (Sweden) Andreas Siljeström def. (Italy) Flavio Cipolla / (Brazil) Rogério Dutra Silva, 0–6, 6–4, [10–8]
