= 2023 Open Città della Disfida – Singles =

Singles
- 2023 Open Città della Disfida

Final
- Champion: (Japan) Shintaro Mochizuki
- Runner-up: (Argentina) Santiago Rodríguez Taverna
- Score: 6–1, 6–4

Events
Singles	Doubles
- Open Città della Disfida

Nuno Borges was the defending champion but chose not to defend his title.

Shintaro Mochizuki won the title after defeating Santiago Rodríguez Taverna 6–1, 6–4 in the final.

== Seeds ==
1. Alexander Shevchenko (first round)
2. (Austria) Filip Misolic (first round)
3. (Italy) Franco Agamenone (semifinals)
4. (France) Benoît Paire (first round)
5. (Italy) Francesco Maestrelli (first round)
6. (France) Laurent Lokoli (quarterfinals)
7. (Czech Republic) Zdeněk Kolář (second round)
8. (Italy) Flavio Cobolli (first round)

== Draw ==
Key

- Q = Qualifier
- WC = Wild card
- LL = Lucky loser
- Alt = Alternate
- ITF = ITF entry
- PR = Protected ranking
- SR = Special ranking
- SE = Special exempt
- JE = Junior exempt
- JR = Junior Accelerator Programme entrant
- CO = College Accelerator Programme entrant
- NG = Next Gen Accelerator Program entrant
- w/o = Walkover
- r = Retired
- d = Defaulted

=== Finals ===
Semifinals
(Japan) Shintaro Mochizuki	6	5	6
3	(Italy) Franco Agamenone	4	7	2
(Argentina) Santiago Rodríguez Taverna	6	6
(Romania) Nicholas David Ionel	4	4

Final
(Japan) Shintaro Mochizuki	6	6
(Argentina) Santiago Rodríguez Taverna	1	4

=== Top half ===
First round
1	A Shevchenko	3	7	4
(Argentina) JB Torres	6	5	6
WC	(Italy) F Arnaboldi	2	3
(Japan) S Mochizuki	6	6
(Hungary) Z Piros	3	6	6
Q	(Italy) Edoardo Lavagno	6	1	3
Q	(Italy) J Ocleppo	6^{3}	6	2
7	(Czech Republic) Z Kolář	7^{7}	2	6
3	(Italy) F Agamenone	6	6
Alt	(Australia) J McCabe	0	1
(Serbia) M Zekić	6	1	6^{7}
(Italy) M Gigante	3	6	7^{9}
(France) T Droguet	7^{7}	7^{7}
Q	(Italy) S Napolitano	6^{4}	6^{2}
WC	(Italy) G Mager	6^{4}	3
6	(France) L Lokoli	7^{7}	6

Second round
(Argentina) JB Torres	2	5
(Japan) S Mochizuki	6	7
(Hungary) Z Piros	3	6	6
7	(Czech Republic) Z Kolář	6	3	2
3	(Italy) F Agamenone	3
(Italy) M Gigante	2^{r}
(France) T Droguet	6	5	4
6	(France) L Lokoli	4	7	6

Quarterfinals
(Japan) S Mochizuki	6	6
(Hungary) Z Piros	4	1
3	(Italy) F Agamenone	7	6
6	(France) L Lokoli	5	2

Semifinals
(Japan) S Mochizuki	6	5	6
3	(Italy) F Agamenone	4	7	2

=== Bottom half ===
First round
5	(Italy) F Maestrelli	3	0
(Italy) A Pellegrino	6	6
Q	(Italy) S Travaglia	7^{12}	6
(Croatia) N Serdarušić	6^{10}	3
(Australia) D Sweeny	1	6^{4}
Q	(Italy) J Berrettini	6	7^{7}
(Argentina) S Rodríguez Taverna	6	4	6
4	(France) B Paire	2	6	4
8/WC	(Italy) F Cobolli	4	6^{1}
LL	(Italy) S Caruso	6	7^{7}
(Canada) S Diez	7^{7}	6
(Romania) FC Jianu	6^{5}	1
Q	(Italy) G Piraino	4	6	3
(Romania) ND Ionel	6	4	6
(Argentina) M Navone	7	7
2	(Austria) F Misolic	5	5

Second round
(Italy) A Pellegrino	6	6
Q	(Italy) S Travaglia	2	2
Q	(Italy) J Berrettini	2	2
(Argentina) S Rodríguez Taverna	6	6
LL	(Italy) S Caruso	2	4
(Canada) S Diez	6	6
(Romania) ND Ionel	6	6
(Argentina) M Navone	1	4

Quarterfinals
(Italy) A Pellegrino	3	5
(Argentina) S Rodríguez Taverna	6	7
(Canada) S Diez	1	2
(Romania) ND Ionel	6	6

Semifinals
(Argentina) S Rodríguez Taverna	6	6
(Romania) ND Ionel	4	4
