= 2011 Open Barletta Trofeo Dimiccoli & Boraccino =

Tennis tournament

- Date: 28 March – 3 April
- Edition: 15th
- Location: Barletta, Italy

Champions

Singles
- (Slovenia) Aljaž Bedene

Doubles
- (Czech Republic) Lukáš Rosol / (Slovakia) Igor Zelenay
← 2010 ·	Open Barletta Trofeo Dimiccoli & Boraccino	· 2012 →

The 2011 Open Barletta Trofeo Dimiccoli & Boraccino was a professional tennis tournament played on clay courts. It was the 15th edition of the tournament which was part of the 2011 ATP Challenger Tour. It took place in Barletta, Italy between 28 March – 3 April 2011.

== ATP entrants ==
=== Seeds ===
Country	Player	Rank^{1}	Seed
ITA	Fabio Fognini	53	1
ESP	Pere Riba	74	2
ITA	Filippo Volandri	80	3
SVN	Blaž Kavčič	85	4
CZE	Jan Hájek	106	5
GER	Denis Gremelmayr	109	6
ESP	Albert Ramos	111	7
CZE	Jaroslav Pospíšil	112	8

- Rankings are as of March 21, 2011.

=== Other entrants ===
The following players received wildcards into the singles main draw:

- (Slovenia) Aljaž Bedene
- (Italy) Fabio Fognini
- (Austria) Thomas Muster
- (Italy) Matteo Trevisan

The following players received entry from the qualifying draw:

- (Italy) Andrea Arnaboldi
- (Italy) Alberto Brizzi
- (France) Pierre-Hugues Herbert
- (Italy) Adelchi Virgili

== Champions ==
=== Singles ===
(Slovenia) Aljaž Bedene def. (Italy) Filippo Volandri, 7–5, 6–3

=== Doubles ===
(Czech Republic) Lukáš Rosol / (Slovakia) Igor Zelenay def. (Austria) Martin Fischer / (Austria) Andreas Haider-Maurer, 6–3, 6–2
