= 2023 Open Città della Disfida =

- Date: 3–9 April
- Edition: 23rd
- Surface: Clay
- Location: Barletta, Italy

Champions

Singles
- (Japan) Shintaro Mochizuki

Doubles
- (Italy) Jacopo Berrettini / (Italy) Flavio Cobolli
- Open Città della Disfida

The 2023 Open Città della Disfida was a professional tennis tournament played on clay courts. It was the 23rd edition of the tournament which was part of the 2023 ATP Challenger Tour. It took place in Barletta, Italy between 3 and 9 April 2023.

== Singles main-draw entrants ==
=== Seeds ===
| Country | Player | Rank^{1} | Seed |
|---|---|---|---|
| | Alexander Shevchenko | 101 | 1 |
| AUT | Filip Misolic | 150 | 2 |
| ITA | Franco Agamenone | 166 | 3 |
| FRA | Benoît Paire | 170 | 4 |
| ITA | Francesco Maestrelli | 171 | 5 |
| FRA | Laurent Lokoli | 172 | 6 |
| CZE | Zdeněk Kolář | 174 | 7 |
| ITA | Flavio Cobolli | 177 | 8 |

- ^{1} Rankings are as of 20 March 2023.

=== Other entrants ===
The following players received wildcards into the singles main draw:

- (Italy) Federico Arnaboldi
- (Italy) Flavio Cobolli
- (Italy) Gianluca Mager

The following player received entry into the singles main draw as an alternate:

- (Australia) James McCabe

The following players received entry from the qualifying draw:

- (Italy) Jacopo Berrettini
- (Italy) Edoardo Lavagno
- (Italy) Stefano Napolitano
- (Italy) Julian Ocleppo
- (Italy) Gabriele Piraino
- (Italy) Stefano Travaglia

The following player received entry as a lucky loser:

- (Italy) Salvatore Caruso

== Champions ==
=== Singles ===
- (Japan) Shintaro Mochizuki def. (Argentina) Santiago Rodríguez Taverna 6–1, 6–4.

=== Doubles ===
- (Italy) Jacopo Berrettini / (Italy) Flavio Cobolli def. (Czech Republic) Zdeněk Kolář / (Ukraine) Denys Molchanov 1–6, 7–5, [10–6].
