= Tomislav Draganja =

Croatian tennis player

- Country (sports): Croatia
- Residence: Zagreb, Croatia
- Born: 10 August 1994 (age 31) Split, Croatia
- Height: 6 ft 3 in (191 cm)
- Retired: 2020 (last match)
- Plays: Right-handed (two handed-backhand)
- Prize money: $56,569

Singles
- Career record: 0–0 (at ATP Tour level, Grand Slam level, and in Davis Cup)
- Career titles: 0
- Highest ranking: No. 1,145 (17 November 2014)

Doubles
- Career record: 3–3 (at ATP Tour level, Grand Slam level, and in Davis Cup)
- Career titles: 0
- Highest ranking: No. 115 (26 February 2018)
- Last updated on: 5 November 2024.

Tomislav Draganja (Croatian pronunciation: [tǒmislaʋ drǎɡaɲa]; born 10 August 1994) is a Croatian former tennis player. Draganja primarily focused on doubles, where had a career high ATP doubles ranking of world No. 115 achieved on 26 February 2018.

He mainly competed on the ATP Challenger Tour. Draganja won 4 Challenger doubles titles and 9 ITF Futures doubles titles on the ITF Men's Circuit.

Draganja made his ATP main draw debut in doubles at the 2016 Croatia Open Umag, receiving doubles main draw wildcard alongside Nino Serdarušić.

His older brother is professional tennis player Marin Draganja.

== ATP career finals ==
=== Doubles: 1 (1 runner-up) ===
Legend Grand Slam tournaments (0–0) ATP World Tour Finals (0–0) ATP World Tour Masters 1000 (0–0) ATP World Tour 500 Series (0–0) ATP World Tour 250 Series (0–1)	Finals by surface Hard (0–0) Clay (0–1) Grass (0–0)

Result	W–L	Date	Tournament	Tier	Surface	Partner	Opponents	Score
Loss	0–1	Jul 2017	Croatia Open, Croatia	250 Series	Clay	(Croatia) Marin Draganja	(Argentina) Guillermo Durán (Argentina) Andrés Molteni	3–6, 7–6^{(7–4)}, [6–10]

== Challenger and Futures finals ==
=== Doubles: 33 (13–20) ===
Legend (doubles) ATP Challenger Tour (4–6) ITF Futures Tour (9–14)	Titles by surface Hard (1–2) Clay (11–18) Grass (0–0) Carpet (1–0)

Result	W–L	Date	Tournament	Tier	Surface	Partner	Opponents	Score
Win	1–0	Oct 2012	Croatia F10, Solin	Futures	Clay	(Croatia) Mate Delić	(Slovakia) Andrej Martin (Czech Republic) Jaroslav Pospíšil	6–3, 4–6, [11–9]
Loss	1–1	Oct 2012	Croatia F12, Dubrovnik	Futures	Clay	(Serbia) Ilija Vučić	(Croatia) Toni Androić (Croatia) Dino Marcan	5–7, 1–6
Win	2–1	Jun 2013	Bosnia & Herzegovina F4, Kiseljak	Futures	Clay	(Croatia) Mate Delić	(Croatia) Filip Veger (Croatia) Lovro Zovko	6–4, 6–3
Win	3–1	Aug 2013	Croatia F8, Vinkovci	Futures	Clay	(Croatia) Toni Androić	(Croatia) Ivan Sabanov (Croatia) Matej Sabanov	1–6, 7–6^{(9–7)}, [10–8]
Loss	3–2	Sep 2013	Croatia F9, Osijek	Futures	Clay	(Croatia) Antun Vidak	(Croatia) Duje Delić (Croatia) Antonio Šančić	6–7^{(5–7)}, 5–7
Loss	3–3	Nov 2013	Croatia F13, Umag	Futures	Clay	(Croatia) Toni Androić	(Croatia) Antonio Šančić (Slovenia) Janez Semrajc	6–3, 3–6, [5–10]
Loss	3–4	Mar 2014	Croatia F3, Vrsar	Futures	Clay	(Croatia) Dino Marcan	(Romania) Nicolae Frunză (Romania) Petru-Alexandru Luncanu	2–6, 6–7^{(5–7)}
Loss	3–5	Apr 2014	Croatia F6, Rovinj	Futures	Clay	(Croatia) Joško Topić	(Croatia) Dino Marcan (Croatia) Antonio Šančić	6–7^{(5–7)}, 5–7
Loss	3–6	May 2014	Croatia F9, Bol	Futures	Clay	(Croatia) Dino Marcan	(Australia) Matthew Barton (Australia) Jordan Thompson	2–6, 1–6
Loss	3–7	Aug 2014	Croatia F14, Čakovec	Futures	Clay	(Croatia) Antonio Šančić	(Czech Republic) Jan Kunčík (Czech Republic) Dominik Süč	6–3, 3–6, [8–10]
Loss	3–8	Aug 2014	Croatia F15, Osijek	Futures	Clay	(Croatia) Antonio Šančić	(Czech Republic) Libor Salaba (Czech Republic) Jan Šátral	6–7^{(4–7)}, 4–6
Loss	3–9	Mar 2015	Croatia F3, Umag	Futures	Clay	(Croatia) Antonio Šančić	(Italy) Marco Bortolotti (Spain) Juan Lizariturry	3–6, 6–7^{(6–8)}
Loss	3–10	Mar 2015	Croatia F4, Poreč	Futures	Clay	(Romania) Alexandru-Daniel Carpen	(Sweden) Markus Eriksson (Sweden) Christian Lindell	1–6, 4–6
Loss	3–11	Apr 2015	Croatia F7, Vrsar	Futures	Clay	(Romania) Alexandru-Daniel Carpen	(Croatia) Ivan Sabanov (Croatia) Matej Sabanov	7–6^{(7–3)}, 4–6, [8–10]
Loss	3–12	Jun 2015	Croatia F13, Bol	Futures	Clay	(Croatia) Marin Bradarić	(Sweden) Isak Arvidsson (Sweden) Christian Samuelsson	7–6^{(7–1)}, 3–6, [5–10]
Win	4–12	Jul 2015	Serbia F4, Belgrade	Futures	Clay	(Serbia) Ivan Bjelica	(Croatia) Ivan Sabanov (Croatia) Matej Sabanov	7–5, 7–6^{(7–3)}
Win	5–12	Sep 2015	Croatia F15, Bol	Futures	Clay	(Croatia) Franjo Raspudić	(Italy) Francesco Cano (Italy) Daniele Giorgini	6–2, 6–0
Win	6–12	Sep 2015	Croatia F17, Bol	Futures	Clay	(Croatia) Franjo Raspudić	(Germany) Sebastian Prechtel (Germany) Daniel Uhlig	0–6, 6–3, [10–6]
Loss	6–13	Mar 2016	Croatia F2, Poreč	Futures	Clay	(Serbia) Ivan Bjelica	(Italy) Omar Giacalone (Italy) Pietro Rondoni	2–6, 2–6
Win	7–13	Dec 2006	Croatia F4, Opatija	Futures	Clay	(Croatia) Nino Serdarušić	(Croatia) Ivan Sabanov (Croatia) Matej Sabanov	6–4, 7–6^{(12–10)}
Win	8–13	May 2016	Croatia F6, Bol	Futures	Clay	(Croatia) Franjo Raspudić	(Germany) Florian Fallert (Germany) Paul Wörner	7–6^{(7–3)}, 6–4
Loss	8–14	May 2016	Croatia F7, Bol	Futures	Clay	(Croatia) Franjo Raspudić	(Croatia) Duje Kekez (Croatia) Antun Vidak	6–3, 3–6, [9–11]
Win	9–14	Jun 2016	Bosnia & Herzegovina F4, Sarajevo	Futures	Clay	(Croatia) Nino Serdarušić	(Croatia) Ivan Sabanov (Croatia) Matej Sabanov	7–5, 6–3
Loss	9–15	Aug 2016	Portorož, Slovenia	Challenger	Hard	(Croatia) Nino Serdarušić	(Belarus) Sergey Betov (Belarus) Ilya Ivashka	6–1, 3–6, [4–10]
Loss	9–16	Oct 2016	Rome, Italy	Challenger	Clay	(Croatia) Marin Draganja	(Italy) Federico Gaio (Italy) Stefano Napolitano	7–6^{(7–2)}, 2–6, [3–10]
Win	10–16	Mar 2017	Yokohama, Japan	Challenger	Hard	(Croatia) Marin Draganja	(Belgium) Joris De Loore (Australia) Luke Saville	4–6, 6–3, [10–4]
Loss	10–17	Apr 2017	Barletta, Italy	Challenger	Clay	(Croatia) Marin Draganja	(Italy) Marco Cecchinato (Italy) Matteo Donati	3–6, 4–6
Loss	10–18	Jun 2017	Todi, Italy	Challenger	Clay	(Croatia) Marin Draganja	(Australia) Steven de Waard (New Zealand) Ben McLachlan	7–6^{(9–7)}, 4–6, [7–10]
Win	11–18	Sep 2017	Banja Luka, Bosnia and Herzegovina	Challenger	Clay	(Croatia) Marin Draganja	(Serbia) Danilo Petrović (Serbia) Ilija Vučić	6–4, 6–2
Win	12–18	Oct 2017	Ismaning, Germany	Challenger	Carpet (i)	(Croatia) Marin Draganja	(Germany) Dustin Brown (Germany) Tim Pütz	6–7^{(1–7)}, 6–2, [10–8]
Loss	12–19	Feb 2018	Budapest, Hungary	Challenger	Hard (i)	(Croatia) Marin Draganja	(Canada) Félix Auger-Aliassime (Spain) Nicola Kuhn	6–2, 2–6, [9–11]
Win	13–19	May 2018	Mestre, Italy	Challenger	Clay	(Croatia) Marin Draganja	(Monaco) Romain Arneodo (Serbia) Danilo Petrović	6–4, 6–7^{(2–7)}, [10–2]
Loss	13–20	Apr 2019	Barletta, Italy	Challenger	Clay	(Bosnia and Herzegovina) Tomislav Brkić	(Ukraine) Denys Molchanov (Slovakia) Igor Zelenay	6–7^{(1–7)}, 4–6
