= 2010 Open Barletta =

- Date: March 22 – March 28
- Edition: 14th
- Location: Barletta, Italy

2009 Champions

Singles
- (Spain) Pere Riba

Doubles
- (Spain) David Marrero / (Spain) Santiago Ventura
← 2009 ·	Open Barletta	· 2011 →

The 2010 Open Barletta was a professional tennis tournament played on outdoor red clay courts. It was part of the 2010 ATP Challenger Tour. It took place in Barletta, Italy between 22 and 28 March 2010.

== ATP entrants ==
=== Seeds ===
Nationality	Player	Ranking*	Seeding
FIN	Jarkko Nieminen	85	1
ESP	Santiago Ventura	91	2
BEL	Steve Darcis	99	3
SLO	Blaž Kavčič	101	4
RUS	Igor Kunitsyn	102	5
ESP	Pere Riba	117	6
ESP	Iván Navarro	123	7
ITA	Simone Bolelli	126	8

- Rankings are as of March 8, 2010.

=== Other entrants ===
The following players received wildcards into the singles main draw:

- (Italy) Alessio di Mauro
- (Italy) Thomas Fabbiano
- (Croatia) Franko Škugor
- (Italy) Filippo Volandri

The following players received entry from the qualifying draw:

- (Argentina) Martín Alund
- (Slovenia) Aljaž Bedene
- (Argentina) Carlos Berlocq
- (Italy) Alberto Brizzi

== Champions ==
=== Singles ===
(Spain) Pere Riba def. (Belgium) Steve Darcis, 6–3, ret.

=== Doubles ===
(Spain) David Marrero / (Spain) Santiago Ventura def. (Serbia) Ilija Bozoljac / (Italy) Daniele Bracciali, 6–3, 6–3
