= Igor Zelenay =

Slovak tennis player

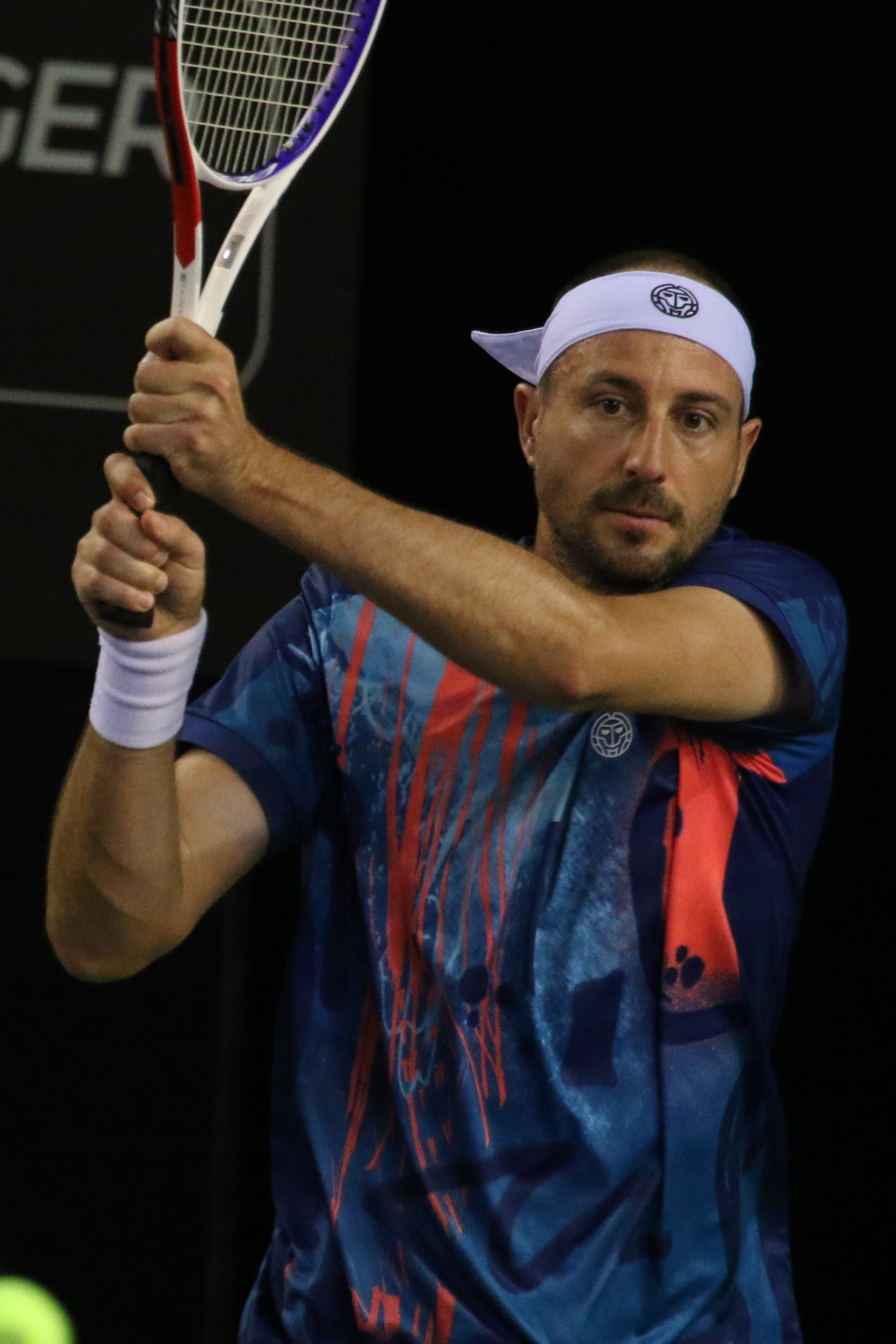
- Country (sports): Slovakia
- Residence: Slovakia
- Born: 10 February 1982 (age 43); Trenčín, Czechoslovakia
- Height: 6 ft 6 in (198 cm)
- Turned pro: 2002
- Retired: Dec 2024
- Plays: Right-handed (two-handed backhand)
- Coach: Juraj Dulik
- Prize money: $ 910,557

Singles
- Career record: 0–0
- Career titles: 0
- Highest ranking: No. 279 (1 August 2005)

Doubles
- Career record: 97–140
- Career titles: 1
- Highest ranking: No. 50 (27 July 2009)

Grand Slam doubles results
- Australian Open: 3R (2010)
- French Open: 3R (2009)
- Wimbledon: 3R (2008, 2009)
- US Open: 2R (2010)
Medal record
Tennis
Representing Slovakia
Summer Universiade
Silver medal – second place	2003 Daegu	Singles
Bronze medal – third place	2003 Daegu	Doubles
Bronze medal – third place	2003 Daegu	Mixed Doubles
- Last updated on: 9 September 2024.

Igor Zelenay (Slovak pronunciation: [ˈiɡɔr ˈzelenaj]; born 10 February 1982) is a Slovak former professional tennis player who was a doubles specialist. He reached a career-high ranking of world No. 50 in July 2009. His career-high singles ranking is No. 279, achieved in August 2005. Zelanay has won one ATP Tour title and finished runner-up at four other ATP tournaments.

== Career ==
Zelenay reached his first ATP doubles final at the 2010 Delray Beach International Tennis Championships, where he and his partner Philipp Marx lost in straight sets to the Bryan brothers.

Zelenay announced his retirement in December 2024.

== ATP career finals ==
=== Doubles: 5 (1 title, 4 runner-ups) ===
Legend Grand Slam tournaments (0–0) ATP World Tour Finals (0–0) ATP World Tour Masters 1000 (0–0) ATP World Tour 500 Series (0–0) ATP World Tour 250 Series (1–4)	Titles by surface Hard (1–2) Clay (0–2) Grass (0–0)	Titles by setting Outdoor (0–2) Indoor (1–2)

Result	W–L	Date	Tournament	Tier	Surface	Partner	Opponents	Score
Loss	0–1	Feb 2010	Delray Beach Open, United States	250 Series	Hard (i)	(Germany) Philipp Marx	(United States) Bob Bryan (United States) Mike Bryan	3–6, 6–7^{(3–7)}
Loss	0–2	Apr 2011	Grand Prix Hassan II, Morocco	250 Series	Clay	(United Kingdom) Colin Fleming	(Sweden) Robert Lindstedt (Romania) Horia Tecău	2–6, 1–6
Loss	0–3	Sep 2012	St. Petersburg Open, Russia	250 Series	Hard (i)	(Slovakia) Lukáš Lacko	(United States) Rajeev Ram (Serbia) Nenad Zimonjić	2–6, 6–4, [6–10]
Loss	0–4	Jul 2018	Swiss Open, Switzerland	250 Series	Clay	(Ukraine) Denys Molchanov	(Italy) Matteo Berrettini (Italy) Daniele Bracciali	6–7^{(2–7)}, 6–7^{(5–7)}
Win	1–4	Sep 2019	St. Petersburg Open, Russia	250 Series	Hard (i)	(India) Divij Sharan	(Italy) Matteo Berrettini (Italy) Simone Bolelli	6–3, 3–6, [10–8]

== Challenger and Futures finals ==
=== Singles: 7 (2–5) ===
Legend (singles) ATP Challenger Tour (0–1) ITF Futures Tour (2–4)	Titles by surface Hard (1–3) Clay (0–1) Grass (0–1) Carpet (1–0)

Result	W–L	Date	Tournament	Tier	Surface	Opponent	Score
Loss	0–1	Jun 2002	Czech Republic F2, Jablonec nad Nisou	Futures	Clay	(France) Régis Lavergne	2–6, 6–4, 5–7
Loss	0–2	Nov 2002	Czech Republic F6, Prague	Futures	Hard	(Czech Republic) Lukáš Dlouhý	3–6, 6–4, 3–6
Loss	0–3	Jan 2003	Germany F1B, Biberach	Futures	Hard (i)	(Croatia) Roko Karanušić	5–7, 5–7
Win	1–3	Sep 2003	France F15, Bagnères-de-Bigorre	Futures	Hard	(France) Nicolas Tourte	7–6^{(7–4)}, 6–7^{(5–7)}, 7–5
Win	2–3	Jan 2005	Austria F1, Anif	Futures	Carpet (i)	(Slovenia) Boštjan Ošabnik	6–3, 6–1
Loss	2–4	Apr 2005	Great Britain F6, Bath	Futures	Hard (i)	(United Kingdom) Mark Hilton	3–6, 4–6
Loss	2–5	Jul 2005	Manchester, Great Britain	Challenger	Grass	(Italy) Daniele Bracciali	4–6, 4–6

=== Doubles: 96 (60–36) ===
Legend (doubles) ATP Challenger Tour (46–30) ITF Futures Tour (14–6)	Titles by surface Hard (16–12) Clay (36–20) Grass (0–0) Carpet (8–4)

Result	W–L	Date	Tournament	Tier	Surface	Partner	Opponents	Score
Win	1–0	Oct 2000	Finland F2, Helsinki	Futures	Carpet	(Slovakia) Karol Beck	(Finland) Jarkko Nieminen (Finland) Tero Vilen	6–2, 6–4
Win	2–0	Jul 2001	Slovakia F5, Bratislava	Futures	Clay	(Slovenia) Borut Urh	(Czech Republic) Martin Štěpánek (Czech Republic) Jiří Vrbka	w/o
Win	3–0	Aug 2001	Togliatti, Russia	Challenger	Hard	(Slovakia) Karol Beck	(Uzbekistan) Abdul Hamid Makhkamov (Uzbekistan) Dmitriy Tomashevich	7–5, 4–6, 6–3
Win	4–0	Aug 2001	Russia F1, Balashikha	Futures	Clay	(Slovakia) Karol Beck	(Kazakhstan) Alexey Kedryuk (Ukraine) Orest Tereshchuk	0–6, 6–3, 6–4
Loss	4–1	Sep 2001	Zabrze, Poland	Challenger	Clay	(Slovakia) Karol Beck	(Austria) Julian Knowle (Germany) Michael Kohlmann	1–6, 6–7^{(5–7)}
Win	5–1	Oct 2001	Greece F4, Corfu	Futures	Carpet	(Australia) Luke Bourgeois	(Czech Republic) Michal Navrátil (Czech Republic) Jiří Vrbka	6–4, 7–6^{(9–7)}
Loss	5–2	Nov 2001	Prague, Czech Republic	Challenger	Hard (i)	(Slovakia) Karol Beck	(Czech Republic) Lukáš Dlouhý (Czech Republic) David Miketa	1–6, 6–4, 3–6
Win	6–2	Jun 2002	Slovakia F1A, Košice	Futures	Clay	(Slovakia) Juraj Hasko	(Slovakia) František Babaj (Slovakia) Michal Mertiňák	3–6, 6–4, 6–3
Win	7–2	Jan 2003	Germany F1C, Oberhaching	Futures	Carpet (i)	(Slovakia) Michal Mertiňák	(Germany) Daniel Elsner (Germany) Philipp Petzschner	4–6, 7–6^{(20–18)}, 7–6^{(7–5)}
Win	8–2	Nov 2003	Prague, Czech Republic	Challenger	Carpet (i)	(Czech Republic) Martin Štěpánek	(Germany) Karsten Braasch (Switzerland) Jean-Claude Scherrer	6–4, 4–6, 6–4
Loss	8–3	Jan 2004	Germany F3, Oberhaching	Futures	Hard (i)	(Poland) Łukasz Kubot	(Denmark) Frederik Nielsen (Denmark) Rasmus Nørby	4–6, 7–6^{(8–6)}, 0–6
Loss	8–4	Apr 2004	France F6, Angers	Futures	Clay (i)	(Serbia and Montenegro) Goran Tošić	(France) Xavier Audouy (France) Nicolas Tourte	1–6, 1–6
Loss	8–5	Apr 2004	Italy F4, Bergamo	Futures	Clay	(Slovakia) Viktor Bruthans	(Italy) Fabio Colangelo (Italy) Alessandro Motti	4–6, 1–6
Win	9–5	May 2004	Czech Republic F1, Most	Futures	Clay	(Czech Republic) Ladislav Chramosta	(Argentina) Diego Junqueira (Argentina) Damián Patriarca	7–6^{(7–2)}, 4–6, 6–1
Loss	9–6	Oct 2004	France F19, La Roche-sur-Yon	Futures	Hard (i)	(Spain) Daniel Muñoz de la Nava	(France) Xavier Audouy (France) Jean-François Bachelot	6–3, 1–6, 2–6
Win	10–6	Oct 2004	Belgium F1, Waterloo	Futures	Carpet (i)	(Serbia and Montenegro) Darko Mađarovski	(Netherlands) Michel Koning (Netherlands) Martijn van Haasteren	6–4, 7–6^{(7–3)}
Win	11–6	Nov 2004	Prague, Czech Republic	Challenger	Carpet (i)	(Czech Republic) Lukáš Dlouhý	(Czech Republic) Jan Minář (Czech Republic) Jaroslav Pospíšil	6–3, 3–6, 7–6^{(7–5)}
Win	12–6	Jun 2005	Košice, Slovakia	Challenger	Clay	(Czech Republic) Petr Luxa	(Sweden) Johan Landsberg (Israel) Harel Levy	6–4, 6–2
Win	13–6	Dec 2006	Czech Republic F4, Vendryně	Futures	Hard (i)	(Czech Republic) Lukáš Rosol	(Czech Republic) Daniel Lustig (Slovakia) Filip Polášek	6–1, 6–1
Win	14–6	Dec 2006	Czech Republic F5, Opava	Futures	Carpet (i)	(Czech Republic) Lukáš Rosol	(Czech Republic) Roman Vögeli (Czech Republic) Jaroslav Pospíšil	4–6, 6–2, 6–1
Win	15–6	Mar 2007	France F5, Poitiers	Futures	Hard (i)	(Slovakia) Filip Polášek	(Romania) Victor Ioniță (United States) Brian Wilson	6–4, 6–4
Loss	15–7	May 2007	Czech Republic F1, Teplice	Futures	Clay	(Austria) Martin Slanar	(Czech Republic) Roman Kutáč (Czech Republic) Karel Tříska	4–6, 4–6
Win	16–7	Jul 2007	Oberstaufen, Germany	Challenger	Clay	(Slovakia) Filip Polášek	(Germany) Peter Gojowczyk (Germany) Marc Sieber	7–5, 7–5
Win	17–7	Aug 2007	Slovakia F3, Bratislava	Futures	Clay	(Slovakia) Filip Polášek	(Slovakia) Viktor Bruthans (Slovakia) Ján Stančík	w/o
Loss	17–8	Sep 2007	Düsseldorf, Germany	Challenger	Clay	(Slovakia) Filip Polášek	(Italy) Fabio Colangelo (Germany) Philipp Marx	6–3, 3–6, [7–10]
Win	18–8	Sep 2007	Trnava, Slovakia	Challenger	Clay	(Slovakia) Filip Polášek	(Argentina) Diego Junqueira (Spain) Rubén Ramírez Hidalgo	6–1, 6–4
Loss	18–9	Oct 2007	Rennes, France	Challenger	Carpet (i)	(Slovakia) Filip Polášek	(Germany) Philipp Petzschner (Germany) Björn Phau	2–6, 2–6
Win	19–9	Dec 2007	Czech Republic F5, Frýdlant nad Ostravicí	Futures	Hard (i)	(Czech Republic) Lukáš Rosol	(Czech Republic) Jiří Krkoška (Slovakia) Ján Stančík	6–4, 6–2
Loss	19–10	Dec 2007	Czech Republic F6, Opava	Futures	Carpet (i)	(Czech Republic) Lukáš Rosol	(Croatia) Nikola Martinović (Croatia) Joško Topić	4–6, 5–7
Loss	19–11	Feb 2008	Bergamo, Italy	Challenger	Hard (i)	(United States) James Cerretani	(Italy) Simone Bolelli (Italy) Andreas Seppi	3–6, 0–6
Loss	19–12	May 2008	Ostrava, Czech Republic	Challenger	Clay	(Czech Republic) Jan Hernych	(Ukraine) Sergiy Stakhovsky (Czech Republic) Tomáš Zíb	6–7^{(6–8)}, 6–3, [12–14]
Win	20–12	Jun 2008	Košice, Slovakia	Challenger	Clay	(Poland) Tomasz Bednarek	(Spain) Miguel Ángel López Jaén (Spain) Carlos Poch Gradin	6–1, 4–6, [13–11]
Loss	20–13	Aug 2008	Cordenons, Italy	Challenger	Clay	(Czech Republic) David Škoch	(Italy) Marco Crugnola (Italy) Alessio di Mauro	6–1, 4–6, [6–10]
Loss	20–14	Aug 2008	Istanbul, Turkey	Challenger	Hard	(Czech Republic) David Škoch	(Germany) Michael Kohlmann (Germany) Frank Moser	6–7^{(4–7)}, 4–6
Loss	20–15	Sep 2008	Düsseldorf, Germany	Challenger	Clay	(Czech Republic) Lukáš Rosol	(Czech Republic) Jan Hájek (Czech Republic) Tomáš Zíb	6–1, 2–6, [7–10]
Loss	20–16	Sep 2008	Orléans, France	Challenger	Hard (i)	(Switzerland) Jean-Claude Scherrer	(Ukraine) Sergiy Stakhovsky (Croatia) Lovro Zovko	6–7^{(7–9)}, 4–6
Win	21–16	Sep 2008	Trnava, Slovakia	Challenger	Clay	(Czech Republic) David Škoch	(Austria) Daniel Köllerer (Slovakia) Michal Mertiňák	6–3, 6–1
Loss	21–17	Mar 2009	Besançon, France	Challenger	Hard (i)	(Czech Republic) David Škoch	(Slovakia) Karol Beck (Czech Republic) Jaroslav Levinský	6–2, 5–7, [7–10]
Loss	21–18	Nov 2009	Eckental, Germany	Challenger	Carpet (i)	(Germany) Philipp Marx	(Germany) Michael Kohlmann (Austria) Alexander Peya	4–6, 6–7^{(4–7)}
Loss	21–19	Nov 2009	Aachen, Germany	Challenger	Carpet (i)	(Germany) Philipp Marx	(India) Rohan Bopanna (Pakistan) Aisam Qureshi	4–6, 6–7^{(6–8)}
Win	22–19	Nov 2009	Bratislava, Slovakia	Challenger	Hard (i)	(Germany) Philipp Marx	(Czech Republic) Leoš Friedl (Czech Republic) David Škoch	6–4, 6–4
Win	23–19	Dec 2009	Salzburg, Austria	Challenger	Hard (i)	(Germany) Philipp Marx	(Thailand) Sanchai Ratiwatana (Thailand) Sonchat Ratiwatana	6–4, 7–5
Win	24–19	Oct 2010	Mons, Belgium	Challenger	Hard (i)	(Slovakia) Filip Polášek	(Belgium) Ruben Bemelmans (Belgium) Yannick Mertens	3–6, 6–4, [10–5]
Win	25–19	Apr 2011	Barletta, Italy	Challenger	Clay	(Czech Republic) Lukáš Rosol	(Austria) Martin Fischer (Austria) Andreas Haider-Maurer	6–3, 6–2
Win	26–19	Jul 2011	Orbetello, Italy	Challenger	Clay	(Austria) Julian Knowle	(France) Romain Jouan (France) Benoît Paire	6–1, 7–6^{(7–2)}
Loss	26–20	Mar 2012	Sarajevo, Bosnia and Herzegovina	Challenger	Hard (i)	(Slovakia) Michal Mertiňák	(Germany) Dustin Brown (United Kingdom) Jonathan Marray	6–7^{(2–7)}, 6–2, [9–11]
Loss	26–21	Apr 2012	Barletta, Italy	Challenger	Clay	(United Kingdom) Jonathan Marray	(Sweden) Johan Brunström (Belgium) Dick Norman	4–6, 5–7
Loss	26–22	Apr 2012	Napoli, Italy	Challenger	Clay	(Australia) Rameez Junaid	(Lithuania) Laurynas Grigelis (Italy) Alessandro Motti	4–6, 4–6
Loss	26–23	May 2012	Prague, Czech Republic	Challenger	Clay	(Slovakia) Martin Kližan	(Czech Republic) Lukáš Rosol (Argentina) Horacio Zeballos	5–7, 6–2, [10–12]
Win	27–23	May 2012	Bordeaux, France	Challenger	Clay	(Slovakia) Martin Kližan	(France) Olivier Charroin (United Kingdom) Jonathan Marray	7–6^{(7–5)}, 4–6, [10–4]
Win	28–23	Nov 2012	Helsinki, Finland	Challenger	Hard (i)	(Russia) Mikhail Elgin	(Belarus) Uladzimir Ignatik (Chinese Taipei) Jimmy Wang	4–6, 7–6^{(7–0)}, [10–4]
Loss	28–24	Mar 2013	Sarajevo, Bosnia and Herzegovina	Challenger	Hard (i)	(Slovakia) Karol Beck	(Bosnia and Herzegovina) Mirza Bašić (Bosnia and Herzegovina) Tomislav Brkić	3–6, 5–7
Win	29–24	Jun 2013	Košice, Slovakia	Challenger	Clay	(Slovakia) Kamil Čapkovič	(Germany) Gero Kretschmer (Germany) Alexander Satschko	6–4, 7–6^{(7–5)}
Loss	29–25	Jul 2013	Braunschweig, Germany	Challenger	Clay	(Sweden) Andreas Siljeström	(Poland) Tomasz Bednarek (Poland) Mateusz Kowalczyk	2–6, 6–7^{(4–7)}
Win	30–25	Sep 2013	Como, Italy	Challenger	Clay	(Australia) Rameez Junaid	(Italy) Marco Crugnola (Italy) Stefano Ianni	7–5, 7–6^{(7–2)}
Win	31–25	Jun 2014	Vicenza, Italy	Challenger	Clay	(Slovakia) Andrej Martin	(Poland) Mateusz Kowalczyk (Poland) Błażej Koniusz	6–1, 7–5
Win	32–25	Jul 2014	Braunschweig, Germany	Challenger	Clay	(Sweden) Andreas Siljeström	(Australia) Rameez Junaid (Slovakia) Michal Mertiňák	7–5, 6–4
Loss	32–26	Sep 2014	Szczecin, Poland	Challenger	Clay	(Poland) Tomasz Bednarek	(Germany) Dustin Brown (Germany) Jan-Lennard Struff	2–6, 4–6
Win	33–26	Mar 2015	Kazan, Russia	Challenger	Hard (i)	(Russia) Mikhail Elgin	(Italy) Andrea Arnaboldi (Italy) Matteo Viola	6–3, 6–3
Win	34–26	May 2015	Heilbronn, Germany	Challenger	Clay	(Poland) Mateusz Kowalczyk	(Germany) Dominik Meffert (Germany) Tim Pütz	6–4, 6–3
Loss	34–27	Jun 2015	Prostějov, Czech Republic	Challenger	Clay	(Poland) Mateusz Kowalczyk	(Austria) Julian Knowle (Austria) Philipp Oswald	6–4, 3–6, [9–11]
Win	35–27	Jun 2015	Prague, Czech Republic	Challenger	Clay	(Poland) Mateusz Kowalczyk	(Venezuela) Roberto Maytín (Mexico) Miguel Ángel Reyes-Varela	6–2, 7–6^{(7–5)}
Win	36–27	Aug 2015	Slovakia F3, Piešťany	Futures	Clay	(Slovakia) Filip Horanský	(Sweden) Isak Arvidsson (Hungary) Gábor Borsos	6–4, 1–6, [15–13]
Win	37–27	Aug 2015	Cordenons, Italy	Challenger	Clay	(Slovakia) Andrej Martin	(Croatia) Dino Marcan (Croatia) Antonio Šančić	6–4, 5–7, [10–8]
Loss	37–28	Sep 2015	St Remy, France	Challenger	Clay	(Slovakia) Andrej Martin	(United Kingdom) Ken Skupski (United Kingdom) Neal Skupski	4–6, 1–6
Loss	37–29	Oct 2015	Mons, Belgium	Challenger	Hard (i)	(Australia) Rameez Junaid	(Belgium) Ruben Bemelmans (Germany) Philipp Petzschner	3–6, 1–6
Win	38–29	Nov 2015	Bratislava, Slovakia	Challenger	Hard (i)	(Serbia) Ilija Bozoljac	(United Kingdom) Ken Skupski (United Kingdom) Neal Skupski	7–6^{(7–3)}, 4–6, [10–5]
Win	39–29	Nov 2015	Brescia, Italy	Challenger	Hard (i)	(Serbia) Ilija Bozoljac	(Bosnia and Herzegovina) Mirza Bašić (Croatia) Nikola Mektić	6–0, 6–3
Win	40–29	Mar 2016	Kazan, Russia	Challenger	Hard (i)	(Belarus) Aliaksandr Bury	(Russia) Konstantin Kravchuk (Austria) Philipp Oswald	6–2, 4–6, [10–6]
Win	41–29	Jun 2016	Prostějov, Czech Republic	Challenger	Clay	(Belarus) Aliaksandr Bury	(Chile) Julio Peralta (Chile) Hans Podlipnik Castillo	6–4, 6–4
Win	42–29	Jul 2016	Prague, Czech Republic	Challenger	Clay	(Austria) Julian Knowle	(Argentina) Facundo Argüello (Chile) Julio Peralta	6–4, 7–5
Win	43–29	Feb 2017	Quimper, France	Challenger	Hard (i)	(Russia) Mikhail Elgin	(United Kingdom) Ken Skupski (United Kingdom) Neal Skupski	2–6, 7–5, [10–5]
Win	44–29	Feb 2017	Cherbourg, France	Challenger	Hard (i)	(Czech Republic) Roman Jebavý	(Croatia) Dino Marcan (Austria) Tristan-Samuel Weissborn	7–6^{(7–4)}, 6–7^{(4–7)}, [10–6]
Win	45–29	Apr 2017	Francavilla, Italy	Challenger	Clay	(Austria) Julian Knowle	(Australia) Rameez Junaid (Germany) Kevin Krawietz	2–6, 6–2, [10–7]
Loss	45–30	May 2017	Heilbronn, Germany	Challenger	Clay	(Canada) Adil Shamasdin	(Czech Republic) Roman Jebavý (Croatia) Antonio Šančić	4–6, 1–6
Loss	45–31	May 2017	Mestre, Italy	Challenger	Clay	(Austria) Julian Knowle	(United Kingdom) Ken Skupski (United Kingdom) Neal Skupski	7–5, 4–6, [5–10]
Win	46–31	Jul 2017	Braunschweig, Germany	Challenger	Clay	(Austria) Julian Knowle	(Germany) Gero Kretschmer (Germany) Kevin Krawietz	6–3, 7–6^{(7–3)}
Loss	46–32	Aug 2017	Cordenons, Italy	Challenger	Clay	(Netherlands) Matwé Middelkoop	(Czech Republic) Roman Jebavý (Czech Republic) Zdeněk Kolář	2–6, 3–6
Win	47–32	Mar 2018	Zhuhai, China, P.R.	Challenger	Hard	(Ukraine) Denys Molchanov	(Belarus) Aliaksandr Bury (Chinese Taipei) Peng Hsien-yin	7–5, 7–6^{(7–4)}
Loss	47–33	Mar 2018	Shenzhen, China, P.R.	Challenger	Hard	(Ukraine) Denys Molchanov	(Chinese Taipei) Hsieh Cheng-peng (Australia) Rameez Junaid	6–7^{(3–7)}, 3–6
Win	48–33	Apr 2018	Barletta, Italy	Challenger	Clay	(Ukraine) Denys Molchanov	(Uruguay) Ariel Behar (Argentina) Máximo González	6–1, 6–2
Win	49–33	Apr 2018	Tunis, Tunisia	Challenger	Clay	(Ukraine) Denys Molchanov	(France) Jonathan Eysseric (United Kingdom) Joe Salisbury	7–6^{(7–4)}, 6–2
Win	50–33	Jun 2018	Prostějov, Czech Republic	Challenger	Clay	(Ukraine) Denys Molchanov	(Uruguay) Pablo Cuevas (Uruguay) Martín Cuevas	4–6, 6–3, [10–7]
Win	51–33	Aug 2018	Cordenons, Italy	Challenger	Clay	(Ukraine) Denys Molchanov	(Slovakia) Andrej Martin (Spain) Daniel Muñoz de la Nava	3–6, 6–3, [11–9]
Win	52–33	Nov 2018	Bratislava, Slovakia	Challenger	Hard (i)	(Ukraine) Denys Molchanov	(India) Ramkumar Ramanathan (Belarus) Andrei Vasilevski	6–2, 3–6, [11–9]
Win	53–33	Apr 2019	Barletta, Italy	Challenger	Clay	(Ukraine) Denys Molchanov	(Bosnia and Herzegovina) Tomislav Brkić (Croatia) Tomislav Draganja	7–6^{(7–1)}, 6–4
Win	54–33	Apr 2019	Francavilla, Italy	Challenger	Clay	(Ukraine) Denys Molchanov	(Argentina) Guillermo Durán (Spain) David Vega Hernández	6–3, 6–2
Win	55–33	Aug 2019	Augsburg, Germany	Challenger	Clay	(Belarus) Andrei Vasilevski	(Croatia) Ivan Sabanov (Croatia) Matej Sabanov	4–6, 6–4, [10–3]
Win	56–33	Aug 2020	Ostrava, Czech Republic	Challenger	Clay	(New Zealand) Artem Sitak	(Poland) Karol Drzewiecki (Poland) Szymon Walków	7–5, 6–4
Win	57–33	Aug 2021	Liberec, Czech Republic	Challenger	Clay	(Czech Republic) Roman Jebavý	(France) Geoffrey Blancaneaux (France) Maxime Janvier	6–2, 6–7^{(6–8)}, [10–5]
Win	58–33	Oct 2021	Ismaning, Germany	Challenger	Carpet (i)	(Germany) Andre Begemann	(Czech Republic) Marek Gengel (Czech Republic) Tomáš Macháč	6-2, 6-4
Loss	58–34	Feb 2022	Forlí, Italy	Challenger	Hard (i)	(Croatia) Antonio Šančić	(Romania) Victor Vlad Cornea (Germany) Fabian Fallert	4-6, 6-3, [2-10]
Win	59–34	Apr 2022	Madrid, Spain	Challenger	Clay	(Czech Republic) Adam Pavlásek	(Brazil) Rafael Matos (Spain) David Vega Hernández	6–3, 3–6, [10–6]
Win	60–34	May 2022	Zagreb, Croatia	Challenger	Clay	(Czech Republic) Adam Pavlásek	(Croatia) Domagoj Bilješko; Andrey Chepelev	4–6, 6–3, [10–2]
Loss	60–35	June 2022	Parma, Italy	Challenger	Clay	(Ukraine) Denys Molchanov	(Italy) Luciano Darderi (Brazil) Fernando Romboli	2-6, 3-6
Loss	60–36	Oct 2022	Parma, Italy	Challenger	Clay	(Venezuela) Luis David Martínez	(Bosnia and Herzegovina) Tomislav Brkić (Serbia) Nikola Ćaćić	2–6, 2–6

== Doubles performance timeline ==
Key
W	F	SF	QF	#R	RR	Q#	DNQ	A	NH

(W) winner; (F) finalist; (SF) semifinalist; (QF) quarterfinalist; (#R) rounds 4, 3, 2, 1; (RR) round-robin stage; (Q#) qualification round; (DNQ) did not qualify; (A) absent; (NH) not held; (SR) strike rate (events won / competed); (W–L) win–loss record.
To avoid confusion and double counting, these charts are updated at the conclusion of a tournament or when the player's participation has ended.

Tournament	2008	2009	2010	2011	2012	2013	2014	2015	2016	2017	2018	2019	2020	2021	SR	W–L
Grand Slam tournaments
Australian Open	A	A	3R	2R	1R	1R	A	A	1R	A	A	2R	1R	1R	0 / 8	4–8
French Open	A	3R	1R	1R	A	1R	A	A	A	A	A	2R	1R	A	0 / 6	3–6
Wimbledon	3R	3R	2R	1R	1R	1R	1R	1R	1R	1R	Q2	1R	NH	1R	0 / 12	5–12
US Open	A	1R	2R	1R	A	A	A	A	A	A	A	1R	A	A	0 / 4	1–4
Win–loss	2–1	4–3	4–4	1–4	0–2	0–3	0–1	0–1	0–2	0–1	0–0	2–4	0–2	0–2	0 / 30	13–30
