= Open Città della Disfida =

- 2026 Open Città della Disfida

ATP Challenger Tour
- Event name: Open Città della Disfida - Trofeo Lapietra (2025-)
- Location: Barletta, Italy
- Venue: Circolo Tennis Barletta "Hugo Simmen"
- Category: ATP Challenger Tour
- Surface: Clay (red)
- Draw: 32S/24Q/16D
- Prize money: €91,000+H
- Website: Official website

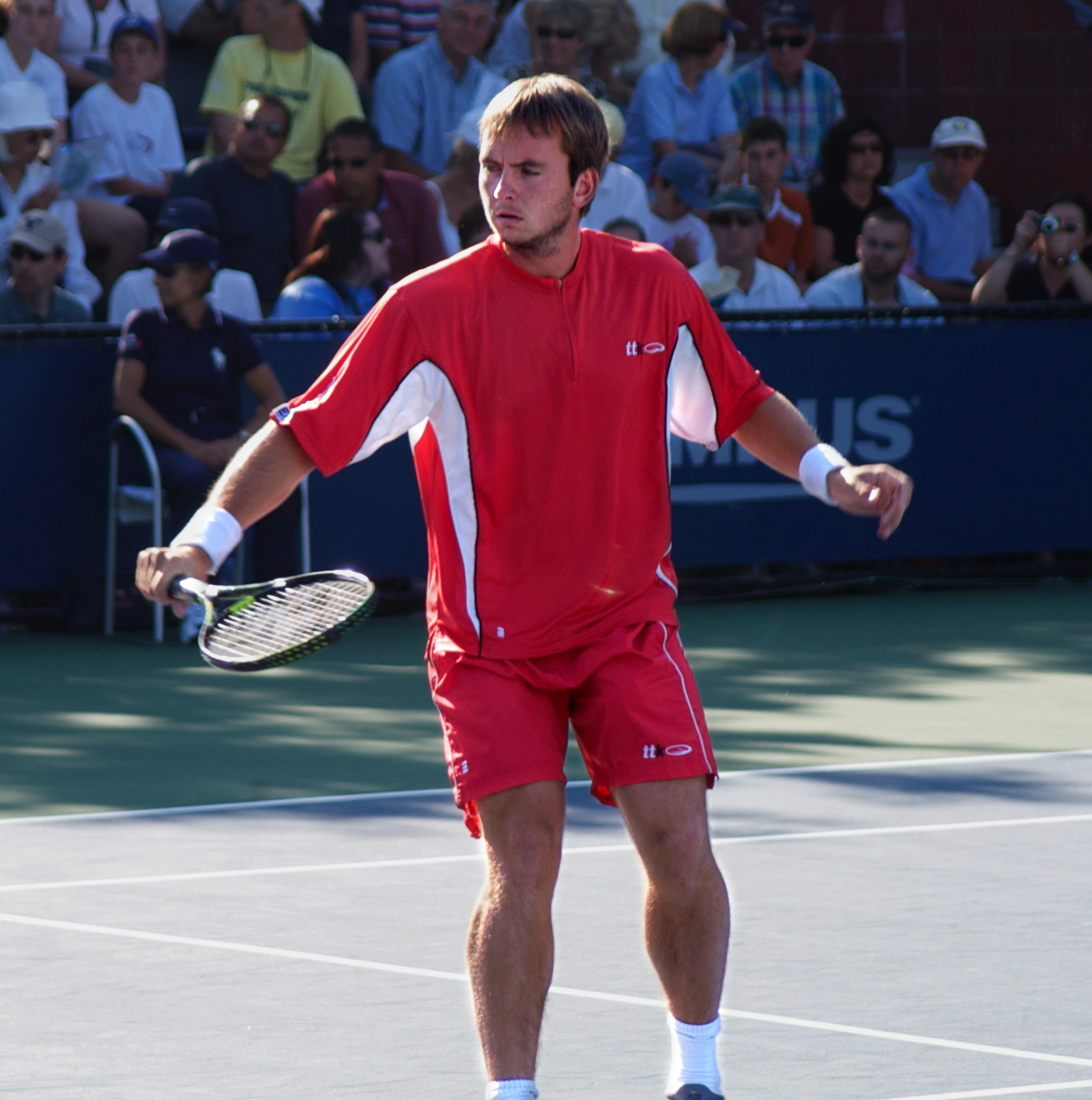
Czech Ivo Minář took the singles title in 2009 over Santiago Ventura

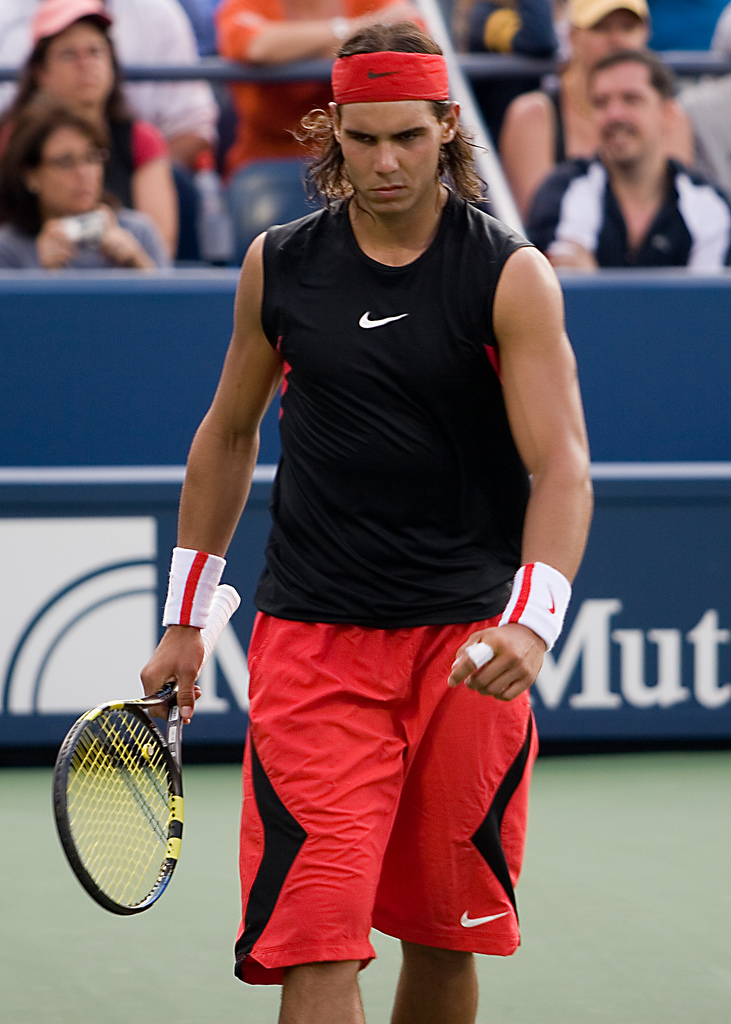
Eventual World No. 1 Rafael Nadal from Spain won the singles in 2003, aged sixteen at the time of the event

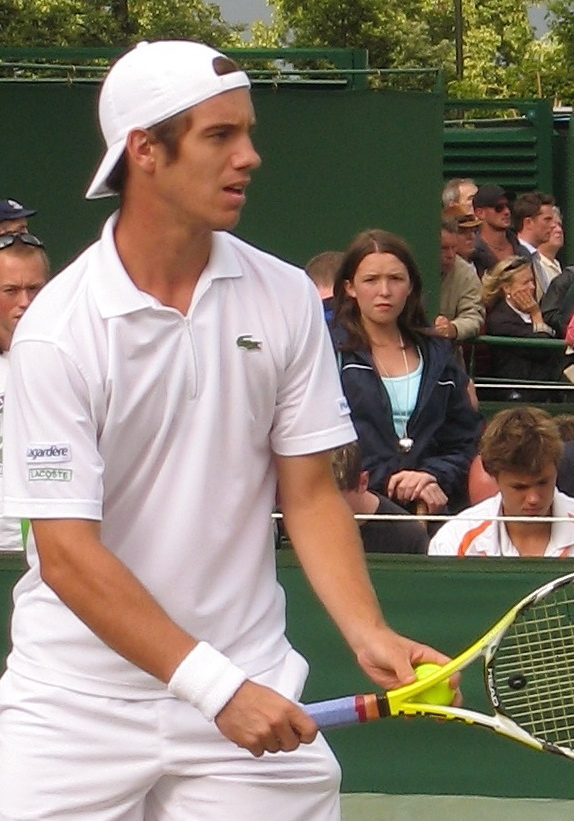
Frenchman Richard Gasquet clinched the singles title in 2005

The Open Città della Disfida - Trofeo Lapietra (previously known as the Open Barletta Trofeo Dimiccoli & Borraccino) is a professional tennis tournament played on outdoor red clay courts. It is currently part of the ATP Challenger Tour. It is held annually at the Circolo Tennis Barletta in Barletta, Italy, since 1997.

Aljaž Bedene is the singles record holder on singles titles, while Santiago Ventura and Igor Zelenay are the ones in doubles - all with three titles each.

== Past finals ==
=== Singles ===
Year	Champion	Runner-up	Score
2026	(Austria) Lukas Neumayer	(Italy) Michele Ribecai	2–6, 6–3, 6–3
2025	(Czech Republic) Dalibor Svrčina	(Ukraine) Vitaliy Sachko	7–5, 6–3
2024	(Bosnia and Herzegovina) Damir Džumhur	(France) Harold Mayot	6–1, 6–3
2023	(Japan) Shintaro Mochizuki	(Argentina) Santiago Rodríguez Taverna	6–1, 6–4
2022	(Portugal) Nuno Borges	(Serbia) Miljan Zekić	6–3, 7–5
2021	(Italy) Giulio Zeppieri	(Italy) Flavio Cobolli	6–1, 3–6, 6–3
2020	Not Held		
2019	(Italy) Gianluca Mager	(Serbia) Nikola Milojević	7–6^{(9–7)}, 5–7, 3–2 ret.
2018	(Argentina) Marco Trungelliti	(Italy) Simone Bolelli	2–6, 7–6^{(7–4)}, 6–4
2017	(United Kingdom) Aljaž Bedene(3)	(Portugal) Gastão Elias	7–6^{(7–4)}, 6–3
2016	(Sweden) Elias Ymer	(Czech Republic) Adam Pavlásek	7–5, 6–4
2013–2015	Not Held		
2012	(Slovenia) Aljaž Bedene (2)	(Italy) Potito Starace	6–2, 6–0
2011	(Slovenia) Aljaž Bedene (1)	(Italy) Filippo Volandri	7–5, 6–3
2010	(Spain) Pere Riba	(Belgium) Steve Darcis	6–3, ret.
2009	(Czech Republic) Ivo Minář	(Spain) Santiago Ventura	6–4, 6–3
2008	(Russia) Mikhail Kukushkin	(Serbia) Boris Pašanski	6–3, 6–4
2007	(Argentina) Carlos Berlocq	(Austria) Werner Eschauer	3–6, 7–6(7), 2–0 retired
2006	(Czech Republic) Jan Hájek	(Italy) Stefano Galvani	6–2, 6–1
2005	(France) Richard Gasquet	(Italy) Alessio di Mauro	6–3, 7–6(6)
2004	(Spain) Nicolás Almagro	(Germany) Tomas Behrend	7–5, 6–2
2003	(Spain) Rafael Nadal	(Spain) Albert Portas	6–2, 7–6(2)
2002	(Spain) Sergi Bruguera	(Italy) Renzo Furlan	3–6, 7–6(5), 7–6(5)
2001	(Spain) Félix Mantilla	(Austria) Markus Hipfl	6–3, 1–0 retired
2000	(Spain) Germán Puentes-Alcaniz	(Spain) Tommy Robredo	6–4, 7–6(3)
1999	(Spain) Jacobo Díaz	(Argentina) Guillermo Cañas	6–7(6), 6–0, 6–3
1998	(Argentina) Francisco Cabello	(Spain) Salvador Navarro-Gutierrez	6–4, 6–4
1997	(Spain) Carlos Costa	(Italy) Davide Sanguinetti	6–3, 6–2

=== Doubles ===
Year	Champions	Runners-up	Score
2026	(Czech Republic) Filip Duda (Serbia) Stefan Latinović	(Slovakia) Miloš Karol (Ukraine) Vitaliy Sachko	7–6^{(7–4)}, 6–7^{(6–8)}, [13–11]
2025	(Peru) Alexander Merino (Germany) Christoph Negritu	(Netherlands) Mats Hermans (Portugal) Tiago Pereira	7–6^{(7–5)}, 6–2
2024	(Czech Republic) Zdeněk Kolář (Chinese Taipei) Tseng Chun-hsin	(France) Théo Arribagé (France) Benjamin Bonzi	1–6, 6–3, [10–7]
2023	(Italy) Jacopo Berrettini (Italy) Flavio Cobolli	(Czech Republic) Zdeněk Kolář (Ukraine) Denys Molchanov	1–6, 7–5, [10–6]
2022	Evgeny Karlovskiy; Evgenii Tiurnev	(Japan) Ben McLachlan (Poland) Szymon Walków	6–3, 6–4
2021	(Italy) Marco Bortolotti (Colombia) Cristian Rodríguez	(Netherlands) Gijs Brouwer (Netherlands) Jelle Sels	6–2, 6–4
2020	Not Held		
2019	(Ukraine) Denys Molchanov (Slovakia) Igor Zelenay (3)	(Bosnia and Herzegovina) Tomislav Brkić (Croatia) Tomislav Draganja	7–6^{(7–1)}, 6–4
2018	(Ukraine) Denys Molchanov (Slovakia) Igor Zelenay (2)	(Uruguay) Ariel Behar (Argentina) Máximo González	6–1, 6–2
2017	(Italy) Marco Cecchinato (Italy) Matteo Donati	(Croatia) Marin Draganja (Croatia) Tomislav Draganja	6–3, 6–4
2016	(Sweden) Johan Brunström (2) (Sweden) Andreas Siljeström	(Italy) Flavio Cipolla (Brazil) Rogério Dutra Silva	0–6, 6–4, [10–8]
2013–2015	Not Held		
2012	(Sweden) Johan Brunström (1) (Belgium) Dick Norman	(United Kingdom) Jonathan Marray (Slovakia) Igor Zelenay	6–4, 7–5
2011	(Czech Republic) Lukáš Rosol (Slovakia) Igor Zelenay (1)	(Austria) Martin Fischer (Austria) Andreas Haider-Maurer	6–3, 6–2
2010	(Spain) David Marrero (2) (Spain) Santiago Ventura (3)	(Serbia) Ilija Bozoljac (Italy) Daniele Bracciali	6–3, 6–3
2009	(Spain) Santiago Ventura (2) (Spain) Rubén Ramírez Hidalgo	(Uruguay) Pablo Cuevas (Peru) Luis Horna	7–6(1), 6–2
2008	(Italy) Flavio Cipolla (Spain) Marcel Granollers	(Austria) Oliver Marach (Slovakia) Michal Mertiňák	6–3, 2–6, 11–9
2007	(Spain) David Marrero (1) (Spain) Albert Portas	(Italy) Alessandro Motti (Italy) Simone Vagnozzi	6–4, 6–4
2006	(Spain) Santiago Ventura (1) (Spain) Fernando Vicente (2)	(Italy) Flavio Cipolla (Italy) Alessandro Motti	7–6(2), 4–6, 10–8
2005	(Belgium) Tom Vanhoudt (Belgium) Kristof Vliegen	(Czech Republic) Lukáš Dlouhý (Russia) Yuri Schukin	6–4, 5–7, 7–5
2004	(Spain) Marc López (Spain) Fernando Vicente (1)	(Czech Republic) Jaroslav Levinský (Czech Republic) David Škoch	7–6(6), 4–6, 6–4
2003	(Argentina) Sebastián Prieto (Argentina) Sergio Roitman	(Italy) Massimo Bertolini (Italy) Giorgio Galimberti	6–3, 3–6, 6–3
2002	(Italy) Massimo Bertolini (Italy) Cristian Brandi	(Italy) Renzo Furlan (Italy) Uros Vico	4–6, 6–3, 7–6(4)
2001	(Spain) Germán Puentes-Alcaniz (Spain) Jairo Velasco Jr.	(Germany) Tomas Behrend (Russia) Mikhail Youzhny	6–1, 1–0 retired
2000	(Czech Republic) Petr Kovačka (Czech Republic) Pavel Kudrnáč	(Romania) Dinu-Mihai Pescariu (Italy) Vincenzo Santopadre	6–7(4), 6–2, 6–0
1999	(Argentina) Guillermo Cañas (Spain) Javier Sánchez	(Argentina) Gastón Gaudio (Argentina) Hernán Gumy	4–6, 6–2, 6–2
1998	(Spain) Juan Balcells (Spain) Juan-Ignacio Carrasco	(Austria) Thomas Strengberger (Federal Republic of Yugoslavia) Dušan Vemić	7–6(4), 6–3
1997	(Portugal) Nuno Marques (Belgium) Tom Vanhoudt	(Spain) Alberto Martín (Spain) Albert Portas	6–3, 6–4
