= XIII Venice Challenge Save Cup – Doubles =

Doubles
- XIII Venice Challenge Save Cup

Final
- Champions: (Italy) Flavio Cipolla (Italy) Potito Starace
- Runners-up: (Argentina) Facundo Bagnis (Peru) Sergio Galdós
- Score: 5–7, 7–6^{(7–3)}, [10–4]

Events
Singles	Doubles
← XII ·	Venice Challenge Save Cup	· XIV →

Pablo Cuevas and Horacio Zeballos were the defending champions, but they decided not to participate this year.

Flavio Cipolla and Potito Starace won the tournament, defeating Facundo Bagnis and Sergio Galdós in the final.

== Seeds ==
1. (Argentina) Guido Andreozzi / (Argentina) Andrés Molteni (quarterfinals)
2. (Argentina) Facundo Bagnis / (Peru) Sergio Galdós (final)
3. (Italy) Flavio Cipolla / (Italy) Potito Starace (champions)
4. (Croatia) Dino Marcan / (Croatia) Antonio Šančić (semifinals)

== Draw ==
=== Key ===
- Q = Qualifier
- WC = Wild card
- LL = Lucky loser
- Alt = Alternate
- ITF = ITF entry
- PR = Protected ranking
- SR = Special ranking
- SE = Special exempt
- JE = Junior exempt
- JR = Junior Accelerator Programme entrant
- CO = College Accelerator Programme entrant
- NG = Next Gen Accelerator Program entrant
- w/o = Walkover
- r = Retired
- d = Defaulted

First round
1	(Argentina) G Andreozzi (Argentina) A Molteni	7^{7}	6^{0}	[10]
(Dominican Republic) J Hernández (Chile) G Lama	6^{5}	7^{7}	[8]
(Spain) R Carballés Baena (Spain) P Riba	3	6	[4]
(Italy) A Arnaboldi (Italy) M Viola	6	3	[10]
3	(Italy) F Cipolla (Italy) P Starace	6	7^{7}
(Slovakia) A Martin (Chile) H Podlipnik-Castillo	2	6^{5}
WC	(Italy) M Berrettini (Italy) G Quinzi	6	4	[10]
(United States) C Buchanan (United States) B Fratangelo	3	6	[7]
(Portugal) G Elias (Mexico) C Ramírez	2	2
(Brazil) G Clezar (Argentina) M González	6	6
WC	(United States) Sam Barnett (United States) J Witten	2	1
4	(Croatia) D Marcan (Croatia) A Šančić	6	6
(United States) J Cerretani (Australia) A Hubble	3	4
PR	(Netherlands) S Arends (Netherlands) S Fransen	6	6
WC	(Italy) Edoardo Eremin (Italy) Pietro Rondoni	6	3	[12]
2	(Argentina) F Bagnis (Peru) S Galdós	3	6	[14]

Quarterfinals
1	(Argentina) G Andreozzi (Argentina) A Molteni	6	6^{7}	[5]
(Italy) A Arnaboldi (Italy) M Viola	3	7^{9}	[10]
3	(Italy) F Cipolla (Italy) P Starace	6	6
WC	(Italy) M Berrettini (Italy) G Quinzi	2	1
(Brazil) G Clezar (Argentina) M González	6^{3}	2
4	(Croatia) D Marcan (Croatia) A Šančić	7^{7}	6
PR	(Netherlands) S Arends (Netherlands) S Fransen	7^{7}	3	[7]
2	(Argentina) F Bagnis (Peru) S Galdós	6^{1}	6	[10]

Semifinals
(Italy) A Arnaboldi (Italy) M Viola	6	6^{4}	[8]
3	(Italy) F Cipolla (Italy) P Starace	1	7^{7}	[10]
4	(Croatia) D Marcan (Croatia) A Šančić	5	3
2	(Argentina) F Bagnis (Peru) S Galdós	7	6

Final
3	(Italy) F Cipolla (Italy) P Starace	5	7^{7}	[10]
2	(Argentina) F Bagnis (Peru) S Galdós	7	6^{3}	[4]
