= XIII Venice Challenge Save Cup – Singles =

Singles
- XIII Venice Challenge Save Cup

Final
- Champion: (Argentina) Máximo González
- Runner-up: (Slovakia) Jozef Kovalík
- Score: 6–1, 6–3

Events
Singles	Doubles
← XII ·	Venice Challenge Save Cup	· XIV →

Pablo Cuevas was the defending champion but chose not to compete.

Máximo González won the tournament defeating Jozef Kovalík in the final, 6–1, 6–3.

== Seeds ==
1. (Italy) Paolo Lorenzi (semifinals, retired)
2. (Argentina) Facundo Bagnis (first round)
3. (Argentina) Guido Pella (first round)
4. (Argentina) Máximo González (champion)
5. (Japan) Yoshihito Nishioka (first round)
6. (United States) Bjorn Fratangelo (first round)
7. (Portugal) Gastão Elias (second round)
8. (Brazil) Guilherme Clezar (second round)

== Draw ==
=== Key ===
- Q = Qualifier
- WC = Wild card
- LL = Lucky loser
- Alt = Alternate
- SE = Special exempt
- PR = Protected ranking
- ITF = ITF entry
- JE = Junior exempt
- w/o = Walkover
- r = Retired
- d = Defaulted
- SR = Special ranking

=== Finals ===
Semifinals
1	(Italy) Paolo Lorenzi	1^{r}
(Slovakia) Jozef Kovalík	0
4	(Argentina) Máximo González	6	6
Alt	(Dominican Republic) José Hernández	3	2

Final
(Slovakia) Jozef Kovalík	1	3
4	(Argentina) Máximo González	6	6

=== Top half ===
First round
1	(Italy) P Lorenzi	6	4	6
(Italy) R Marcora	2	6	2
(Spain) P Riba	7	2	6
Q	(Chile) C Garin	5	6	2
(Italy) T Fabbiano	6^{7}	6^{7}
(Chile) N Jarry	7^{9}	7^{9}
(Italy) A Arnaboldi	7^{7}	1	1
8	(Brazil) G Clezar	6^{3}	6	6
3	(Argentina) G Pella	3	6	2
(Slovakia) J Kovalík	6	1	6
WC	(Italy) Edoardo Eremin	3	1
WC	(Italy) G Quinzi	6	6
WC	(Italy) M Berrettini	6	6^{5}	3
Q	(Italy) S Napolitano	3	7^{7}	6
(Spain) R Carballés Baena	6	6
6	(United States) B Fratangelo	2	0

Second round
1	(Italy) P Lorenzi	6	6
(Spain) P Riba	1	2
(Chile) N Jarry	6	6
8	(Brazil) G Clezar	3	4
(Slovakia) J Kovalík	6	6
WC	(Italy) G Quinzi	3	3
Q	(Italy) S Napolitano	2	4
(Spain) R Carballés Baena	6	6

Quarterfinals
1	(Italy) P Lorenzi	6	6
(Chile) N Jarry	3	4
(Slovakia) J Kovalík	6	6
(Spain) R Carballés Baena	4	3

Semifinals
1	(Italy) P Lorenzi	1^{r}
(Slovakia) J Kovalík	0

=== Bottom half ===
First round
5	(Japan) Y Nishioka	5	5
(Italy) P Starace	7	7
(United States) C Buchanan	6	6
WC	(Italy) M Viola	3	2
(Argentina) G Andreozzi	6	6
(France) M Bourgue	1	2
(Chile) H Podlipnik-Castillo	4	2
4	(Argentina) M González	6	6
7	(Portugal) G Elias	6	7
(Croatia) M Delić	4	5
(Italy) F Volandri	4	1
Q	(France) C Hemery	6	6
(Slovakia) A Martin	7^{7}	6
Q	(United States) M Krueger	6^{3}	4
Alt	(Dominican Republic) J Hernández	7	6
2	(Argentina) F Bagnis	5	3

Second round
(Italy) P Starace	6	6
(United States) C Buchanan	0	2
(Argentina) G Andreozzi	5	0
4	(Argentina) M González	7	6
7	(Portugal) G Elias	6	4	0
Q	(France) C Hemery	3	6	6
(Slovakia) A Martin	3	4
Alt	(Dominican Republic) J Hernández	6	6

Quarterfinals
(Italy) P Starace	4	3
4	(Argentina) M González	6	6
Q	(France) C Hemery	2	1
Alt	(Dominican Republic) J Hernández	6	6

Semifinals
4	(Argentina) M González	6	6
Alt	(Dominican Republic) J Hernández	3	2
