= XVI Venice Challenge Save Cup – Doubles =

Doubles
- XVI Venice Challenge Save Cup

Final
- Champions: (Croatia) Marin Draganja (Croatia) Tomislav Draganja
- Runners-up: (Monaco) Romain Arneodo (Serbia) Danilo Petrović
- Score: 6–4, 6–7^{(2–7)}, [10–2]

Events
Singles	Doubles
← XV ·	Venice Challenge Save Cup

Ken and Neal Skupski were the defending champions but chose not to defend their title.

Marin and Tomislav Draganja won the title after defeating Romain Arneodo and Danilo Petrović 6–4, 6–7^{(2–7)}, [10–2] in the final.

== Seeds ==
1. (Belgium) Sander Gillé / (Belgium) Joran Vliegen (quarterfinals, retired)
2. (Mexico) Miguel Ángel Reyes-Varela / (Brazil) Fernando Romboli (semifinals)
3. (Peru) Sergio Galdós / (Brazil) Fabrício Neis (first round)
4. (Croatia) Marin Draganja / (Croatia) Tomislav Draganja (champions)

== Draw ==
=== Key ===
- Q = Qualifier
- WC = Wild card
- LL = Lucky loser
- Alt = Alternate
- SE = Special exempt
- PR = Protected ranking
- ITF = ITF entry
- JE = Junior exempt
- w/o = Walkover
- r = Retired
- d = Defaulted
- SR = Special ranking

First round
1	(Belgium) S Gillé (Belgium) J Vliegen	7	6
(Poland) T Bednarek (United States) H Reese	5	4
WC	(Italy) F Gaio (Italy) GM Moroni	6	4	[10]
(Spain) Carlos Boluda-Purkiss (Spain) S Gutiérrez Ferrol	3	6	[7]
4	(Croatia) M Draganja (Croatia) T Draganja	6	6
WC	(Italy) W Trusendi (Italy) M Viola	4	3
WC	(Italy) Omar Giacalone (Italy) Jacopo Stefanini	6^{4}	6	[6]
(Italy) A Arnaboldi (Italy) L Vanni	7^{7}	3	[10]
(Monaco) R Arneodo (Serbia) D Petrović	6	5	[10]
(Spain) G Granollers (Spain) D Vega Hernández	3	7	[7]
(Croatia) I Sabanov (Croatia) M Sabanov	6	6
3	(Peru) S Galdós (Brazil) F Neis	2	2
Alt	(Belgium) K Coppejans (Belgium) A De Greef	4	2
Alt	(Bosnia and Herzegovina) T Brkić (Serbia) M Zekić	6	6
(Italy) L Giustino (United States) M Krueger	3	2
2	(Mexico) MÁ Reyes-Varela (Brazil) F Romboli	6	6

Quarterfinals
1	(Belgium) S Gillé (Belgium) J Vliegen	6^{2}	0^{r}
WC	(Italy) F Gaio (Italy) GM Moroni	7^{7}	1
4	(Croatia) M Draganja (Croatia) T Draganja	6	4	[17]
(Italy) A Arnaboldi (Italy) L Vanni	4	6	[15]
(Monaco) R Arneodo (Serbia) D Petrović	6	7
(Croatia) I Sabanov (Croatia) M Sabanov	3	5
Alt	(Bosnia and Herzegovina) T Brkić (Serbia) M Zekić	2	7	[7]
2	(Mexico) MÁ Reyes-Varela (Brazil) F Romboli	6	5	[10]

Semifinals
WC	(Italy) F Gaio (Italy) GM Moroni	3	4
4	(Croatia) M Draganja (Croatia) T Draganja	6	6
(Monaco) R Arneodo (Serbia) D Petrović	6	1	[10]
2	(Mexico) MÁ Reyes-Varela (Brazil) F Romboli	4	6	[3]

Final
4	(Croatia) M Draganja (Croatia) T Draganja	6	6^{2}	[10]
(Monaco) R Arneodo (Serbia) D Petrović	4	7^{7}	[2]
