= XVI Venice Challenge Save Cup – Singles =

Singles
- XVI Venice Challenge Save Cup

Final
- Champion: (Italy) Gianluigi Quinzi
- Runner-up: (Italy) Gian Marco Moroni
- Score: 6–2, 6–2

Events
Singles	Doubles
← XV ·	Venice Challenge Save Cup

João Domingues was the defending champion but chose not to defend his title.

Gianluigi Quinzi won the title after defeating Gian Marco Moroni 6–2, 6–2 in the final.

== Seeds ==
1. (Belgium) Arthur De Greef (first round)
2. (Serbia) Danilo Petrović (semifinals)
3. (Chinese Taipei) Yang Tsung-hua (first round)
4. (Italy) Gianluigi Quinzi (champion)
5. (Bosnia and Herzegovina) Tomislav Brkić (second round)
6. (United States) Mitchell Krueger (semifinals)
7. (Italy) Lorenzo Giustino (quarterfinals)
8. (Spain) Carlos Boluda-Purkiss (first round)

== Draw ==
=== Key ===
- Q = Qualifier
- WC = Wild card
- LL = Lucky loser
- Alt = Alternate
- SE = Special exempt
- PR = Protected ranking
- ITF = ITF entry
- JE = Junior exempt
- w/o = Walkover
- r = Retired
- d = Defaulted
- SR = Special ranking

=== Finals ===
Semifinals
6	(United States) Mitchell Krueger	5	2
WC	(Italy) Gian Marco Moroni	7	6
4	(Italy) Gianluigi Quinzi	6	7^{7}
2	(Serbia) Danilo Petrović	2	6^{3}

Final
WC	(Italy) Gian Marco Moroni	2	2
4	(Italy) Gianluigi Quinzi	6	6

=== Top half ===
First round
1	(Belgium) A De Greef	4	6	3
WC	(Italy) A Arnaboldi	6	4	6
(Czech Republic) V Šafránek	2	6	7^{7}
(Portugal) F Ferreira Silva	6	2	6^{5}
(Portugal) João Monteiro	7	6^{13}	6
SE	(Spain) M Vilella Martínez	5	7^{15}	1
(Argentina) P Cachin	6	4	2^{r}
6	(United States) M Krueger	4	6	3
3	(Chinese Taipei) T-h Yang	3	0
(Lithuania) L Grigelis	6	6
SE	(Italy) L Vanni	3	6	6
(Italy) M Viola	6	1	4
Q	(Germany) D Masur	3	2
WC	(Italy) GM Moroni	6	6
(Uruguay) M Cuevas	2	4
5	(Bosnia and Herzegovina) T Brkić	6	6

Second round
WC	(Italy) A Arnaboldi	6	6
(Czech Republic) V Šafránek	3	1
(Portugal) J Monteiro	6^{1}	3
6	(United States) M Krueger	7^{7}	6
(Lithuania) L Grigelis	6	2	6
SE	(Italy) L Vanni	2	6	2
WC	(Italy) GM Moroni	6	6
5	(Bosnia and Herzegovina) T Brkić	4	4

Quarterfinals
WC	(Italy) A Arnaboldi	2	0^{r}
6	(United States) M Krueger	6	3
(Lithuania) L Grigelis	2	0
WC	(Italy) GM Moroni	6	6

Semifinals
6	(United States) M Krueger	5	2
WC	(Italy) GM Moroni	7	6

=== Bottom half ===
First round
7	(Italy) L Giustino	7	6
(Spain) C Gómez-Herrera	5	4
WC	(Italy) L Caruana	6	7^{7}
Q	(Italy) Edoardo Eremin	2	6^{5}
WC	(Italy) F Baldi	6	6
(Argentina) H Casanova	3	2
Q	(Italy) F Gaio	6^{4}	3
4	(Italy) G Quinzi	7^{7}	6
8	(Spain) Carlos Boluda-Purkiss	4	7	3
Q	(Italy) R Marcora	6	5	6
(Spain) S Gutiérrez Ferrol	6	7
(Serbia) M Zekić	1	5
(Spain) D Muñoz de la Nava	1	2
(Netherlands) S Griekspoor	6	6
(Italy) A Basso	6	1	3
2	(Serbia) D Petrović	2	6	6

Second round
7	(Italy) L Giustino	6	6
WC	(Italy) L Caruana	1	1
WC	(Italy) F Baldi	2	0^{r}
4	(Italy) G Quinzi	6	1
Q	(Italy) R Marcora	5	4
(Spain) S Gutiérrez Ferrol	7	6
(Netherlands) S Griekspoor	7^{7}	6^{4}	1
2	(Serbia) D Petrović	6^{4}	7^{7}	6

Quarterfinals
7	(Italy) L Giustino	6	6^{5}	3
4	(Italy) G Quinzi	2	7^{7}	6
(Spain) S Gutiérrez Ferrol	6	4	1
2	(Serbia) D Petrović	1	6	6

Semifinals
4	(Italy) G Quinzi	6	7^{7}
2	(Serbia) D Petrović	2	6^{3}
