= XIV Venice Challenge Save Cup – Singles =

Singles
- XIV Venice Challenge Save Cup

Final
- Champion: (Portugal) Gastão Elias
- Runner-up: (Argentina) Horacio Zeballos
- Score: 7–6^{(7–0)}, 6–2

Events
Singles	Doubles
← XIII ·	Venice Challenge Save Cup	· XV →

Máximo González was the defending champion, but chose not to defend his title.

Gastão Elias won the title after defeating Horacio Zeballos 7–6^{(7–0)}, 6–2 in the final.

== Seeds ==
1. (Italy) Paolo Lorenzi (semifinals)
2. (Serbia) Dušan Lajović (quarterfinals)
3. (Argentina) Horacio Zeballos (final)
4. (Portugal) Gastão Elias (champion)
5. (France) Constant Lestienne (first round)
6. (Portugal) Frederico Ferreira Silva (first round)
7. (Canada) Steven Diez (first round)
8. (Italy) Salvatore Caruso (first round)

== Draw ==
=== Key ===
- Q = Qualifier
- WC = Wild card
- LL = Lucky loser
- Alt = Alternate
- SE = Special exempt
- PR = Protected ranking
- ITF = ITF entry
- JE = Junior exempt
- w/o = Walkover
- r = Retired
- d = Defaulted
- SR = Special ranking

=== Finals ===
Semifinals
1	(Italy) Paolo Lorenzi	7	2	2
4/Alt	(Portugal) Gastão Elias	5	6	6
3	(Argentina) Horacio Zeballos	6	6
(Belgium) Joris De Loore	3	3

Final
4/Alt	(Portugal) Gastão Elias	7^{7}	6
3	(Argentina) Horacio Zeballos	6^{0}	2

=== Top half ===
First round
1	(Italy) P Lorenzi	1	6	7
(Austria) B Trinker	6	1	5
Q	(Chile) N Jarry	5	7^{7}	7^{8}
WC	(Italy) Edoardo Eremin	7	6^{3}	6^{6}
(Austria) D Novak	7^{7}	6
WC	(Italy) L Sonego	6^{2}	1
(Belarus) I Ivashka	6	6
5	(France) C Lestienne	4	2
4/Alt	(Portugal) G Elias	6	6
(Spain) O Roca Batalla	1	3
Q	(Czech Republic) M Michalička	6	6
(United States) E Escobedo	4	2
(Italy) M Viola	7^{10}	6
WC	(Italy) S Napolitano	6^{8}	3
Q	(Germany) Masur	5	6	6
7	(Canada) S Diez	7	2	0

Second round
1	(Italy) P Lorenzi	3	6	6
Q	(Chile) N Jarry	6	3	2
(Austria) D Novak	6	6
(Belarus) I Ivashka	1	3
4/Alt	(Portugal) G Elias	4	6	6
Q	(Czech Republic) M Michalička	6	3	3
(Italy) M Viola	6	6
Q	(Germany) Masur	2	2

Quarterfinals
1	(Italy) P Lorenzi	2	6	6
(Austria) D Novak	6	4	4
4/Alt	(Portugal) G Elias	6	6
(Italy) M Viola	2	4

Semifinals
1	(Italy) P Lorenzi	7	2	2
4/Alt	(Portugal) G Elias	5	6	6

=== Bottom half ===
First round
6	(Portugal) FF Silva	4	5
(Spain) G Granollers	6	7
Q	(Serbia) D Petrović	5	5
WC	(Italy) G Mager	7	7
(Italy) A Bega	2	6^{3}
(Czech Republic) Robin Staněk	6	7^{7}
(Spain) R Ramírez Hidalgo	6	2	4
3	(Argentina) H Zeballos	3	6	6
8	(Italy) S Caruso	2	4
(Belgium) Y Reuter	6	6
(Belgium) J De Loore	7	2	6
(Argentina) T Lipovšek Puches	5	6	0
(Brazil) C Zampieri	4	1
(Dominican Republic) J Hernández	6	6
(Brazil) J Pereira	6	6^{2}	2
2	(Serbia) D Lajović	2	7^{7}	6

Second round
(Spain) G Granollers	4	4
WC	(Italy) G Mager	6	6
(Czech Republic) R Staněk	1	7^{13}	4
3	(Argentina) H Zeballos	6	6^{11}	6
(Belgium) Y Reuter	3	4
(Belgium) J De Loore	6	6
(Dominican Republic) J Hernández	4	7^{7}	5
2	(Serbia) D Lajović	6	6^{3}	7

Quarterfinals
WC	(Italy) G Mager	3	4
3	(Argentina) H Zeballos	6	6
(Belgium) J De Loore	6	6
2	(Serbia) D Lajović	3	4

Semifinals
3	(Argentina) H Zeballos	6	6
(Belgium) J De Loore	3	3
