= XIII Venice Challenge Save Cup =

- Date: 1–7 June
- Edition: 2nd
- Draw: 32S / 16D
- Prize money: €42,500
- Surface: Clay
- Location: Mestre, Italy

Champions

Singles
- (Argentina) Máximo González

Doubles
- (Italy) Flavio Cipolla / (Italy) Potito Starace
← XII ·	Venice Challenge Save Cup	· XIV →

The XIII Venice Challenge Save Cup is a professional tennis tournament played on clay courts. It is the 2nd edition of the men's tournament which was part of the 2015 ATP Challenger Tour. It took place in Mestre, Italy between 1 and 7 June 2015.

== Singles main-draw entrants ==
=== Seeds ===
Country	Player	Rank^{1}	Seed
ITA	Paolo Lorenzi	86	1
ARG	Facundo Bagnis	96	2
ARG	Guido Pella	113	3
ARG	Máximo González	114	4
JPN	Yoshihito Nishioka	146	5
USA	Bjorn Fratangelo	149	6
POR	Gastão Elias	152	7
BRA	Guilherme Clezar	172	8

- ^{1} Rankings as of May 25, 2015.

=== Other entrants ===
The following players received wildcards into the singles main draw:

- (Italy) Matteo Berrettini
- (Italy) Edoardo Eremin
- (Italy) Gianluigi Quinzi
- (Italy) Matteo Viola

The following player received entry as alternate:

- (Dominican Republic) José Hernández

The following players received entry from the qualifying draw:

- (Chile) Cristian Garín
- (France) Calvin Hemery
- (United States) Mitchell Krueger
- (Italy) Stefano Napolitano

== Doubles main-draw entrants ==
=== Seeds ===
Country	Player	Country	Player	Rank^{1}	Seed
ARG	Guido Andreozzi	ARG	Andrés Molteni	258	1
ARG	Facundo Bagnis	PER	Sergio Galdós	294	2
ITA	Flavio Cipolla	ITA	Potito Starace	329	3
CRO	Dino Marcan	CRO	Antonio Šančić	354	4

- ^{1} Rankings as of May 25, 2015.

=== Other entrants ===
The following pairs received wildcards into the doubles main draw:

- (United States) Sam Barnett / (United States) Jesse Witten
- (Italy) Matteo Berrettini / (Italy) Gianluigi Quinzi
- (Italy) Edoardo Eremin / (Italy) Pietro Rondoni

== Champions ==
=== Singles ===
- (Argentina) Máximo González def. (Slovakia) Jozef Kovalík, 6–1, 6–3

=== Doubles ===
- (Italy) Flavio Cipolla / (Italy) Potito Starace def. (Argentina) Facundo Bagnis / (Peru) Sergio Galdós, 5–7, 7–6^{(7–3)}, [10–4]
