= XII Venice Challenge Save Cup – Doubles =

Doubles
- XII Venice Challenge Save Cup

Final
- Champion: (Uruguay) Pablo Cuevas (Argentina) Horacio Zeballos
- Runner-up: (Italy) Daniele Bracciali (Italy) Potito Starace
- Score: 6–4, 6–1

Events
Singles	Doubles
Venice Challenge Save Cup	· XIII →

Pablo Cuevas and Horacio Zeballos won the title, defeating Daniele Bracciali and Potito Starace in the final, 6–4, 6–1.

== Seeds ==
1. (Uruguay) Pablo Cuevas / (Argentina) Horacio Zeballos (champions)
2. (Italy) Daniele Bracciali / (Italy) Potito Starace (final)
3. (Germany) Dominik Meffert / (Germany) Tim Puetz (semifinals)
4. (Colombia) Nicolás Barrientos / (Colombia) Juan Carlos Spir (semifinals)

== Draw ==
=== Key ===
- Q = Qualifier
- WC = Wild card
- LL = Lucky loser
- Alt = Alternate
- SE = Special exempt
- PR = Protected ranking
- ITF = ITF entry
- JE = Junior exempt
- w/o = Walkover
- r = Retired
- d = Defaulted
- SR = Special ranking

=== Draw ===
First round
1	(Uruguay) P Cuevas (Argentina) H Zeballos	6	6
(Italy) T Fabbiano (Italy) L Giustino	4	2
(Italy) A Motti (Italy) M Viola	6	7^{7}
(Italy) M Cecchinato (Italy) A Giannessi	2	6^{2}
4	(Colombia) N Barrientos (Colombia) JS Spir	6	6
(Italy) A Arnaboldi (Italy) F Cipolla	4	3
(Argentina) F Bagnis (Peru) S Galdós	6	6
(Brazil) RD da Silva (France) M Teixeira	3	2
(Argentina) M Alund (Argentina) A Collarini	6	6
WC	(Italy) A Basso (Italy) G Mager	1	1
WC	(Slovenia) A Kračman (Croatia) M Radić	4	2
3	(Germany) D Meffert (Germany) T Puetz	6	6
WC	(Italy) D Giorgini (Italy) Matteo Volante	4	0
(Argentina) JI Londero (Argentina) A Molteni	6	6
(Italy) R Ghedin (Italy) C Grassi	1	3
2	(Italy) D Bracciali (Italy) P Starace	6	6

Quarterfinals
1	(Uruguay) P Cuevas (Argentina) H Zeballos	7	6
(Italy) A Motti (Italy) M Viola	5	3
4	(Colombia) N Barrientos (Colombia) JS Spir	6	6
(Argentina) F Bagnis (Peru) S Galdós	3	4
(Argentina) M Alund (Argentina) A Collarini	6	3	[4]
3	(Germany) D Meffert (Germany) T Puetz	4	6	[10]
(Argentina) JI Londero (Argentina) A Molteni	4	6	[12]
2	(Italy) D Bracciali (Italy) P Starace	6	3	[14]

Semifinals
1	(Uruguay) P Cuevas (Argentina) H Zeballos	6	7^{7}
4	(Colombia) N Barrientos (Colombia) JS Spir	3	6^{2}
3	(Germany) D Meffert (Germany) T Puetz	6	3	[9]
2	(Italy) D Bracciali (Italy) P Starace	4	6	[11]

Final
1	(Uruguay) P Cuevas (Argentina) H Zeballos	6	6
2	(Italy) D Bracciali (Italy) P Starace	4	1
