= XII Venice Challenge Save Cup =

- Date: 2–8 June 2014
- Edition: 1st
- Draw: 32S / 16D
- Prize money: €42,500
- Surface: Clay
- Location: Mestre, Italy

Champions

Singles
- (Uruguay) Pablo Cuevas

Doubles
- (Uruguay) Pablo Cuevas / (Argentina) Horacio Zeballos
Venice Challenge Save Cup	· XIII →

The XII Venice Challenge Save Cup was a professional tennis tournament played on clay courts. It was the 1st edition of the men's tournament which was part of the 2014 ATP Challenger Tour. It took place in Mestre, Italy between 2 and 8 June 2014.

== Singles main-draw entrants ==
=== Seeds ===
Country	Player	Rank^{1}	Seed
ITA	Paolo Lorenzi	88	1
ESP	Daniel Gimeno Traver	94	2
ITA	Filippo Volandri	99	3
TUN	Malek Jaziri	116	4
ARG	Horacio Zeballos	122	5
URU	Pablo Cuevas	136	6
ARG	Facundo Bagnis	143	7
ITA	Marco Cecchinato	156	8

- ^{1} Rankings are as of May 26, 2014.

=== Other entrants ===
The following players received wildcards into the singles main draw:

- (Italy) Marco Cecchinato
- (Italy) Salvatore Caruso
- (Italy) Stefano Travaglia
- (Argentina) Horacio Zeballos

The following players received entry from the qualifying draw:

- (Slovenia) Janez Semrajc
- (Italy) Alessandro Giannessi
- (Italy) Roberto Marcora
- (Argentina) Marco Trungelliti

== Doubles main-draw entrants ==
=== Seeds ===
Country	Player	Country	Player	Rank^{1}	Seed
URU	Pablo Cuevas	ARG	Horacio Zeballos	80	1
ITA	Daniele Bracciali	ITA	Potito Starace	204	2
GER	Dominik Meffert	GER	Tim Puetz	236	3
COL	Nicolás Barrientos	COL	Juan Carlos Spir	251	4

- ^{1} Rankings as of May 26, 2014.

=== Other entrants ===
The following pairs received wildcards into the doubles main draw:

- (Italy) Andrea Basso / (Italy) Gianluca Mager
- (Slovenia) Andrej Kračman / (Croatia) Mario Radić
- (Italy) Daniele Giorgini / (Italy) Matteo Volante

== Champions ==
=== Singles ===
- (Uruguay) Pablo Cuevas def. (Italy) Marco Cecchinato, 6–4, 4–6, 6–2

=== Doubles ===
- (Uruguay) Pablo Cuevas / (Argentina) Horacio Zeballos def. (Italy) Daniele Bracciali / (Italy) Potito Starace, 6–4, 6–1
