= XV Venice Challenge Save Cup =

- Date: 22–28 May
- Edition: 4th
- Draw: 32S / 16D
- Surface: Clay
- Location: Mestre, Italy

Champions

Singles
- (Portugal) João Domingues

Doubles
- (United Kingdom) Ken Skupski / (United Kingdom) Neal Skupski
← XIV ·	Venice Challenge Save Cup	· XVI →

The XV Venice Challenge Save Cup was a professional tennis tournament played on clay courts. It was the 4th edition of the men's tournament which was part of the 2017 ATP Challenger Tour. It took place in Mestre, Italy between 22 and 28 May 2017.

== Point distribution ==
Event	W	F	SF	QF	Round of 16	Round of 32	Q	Q2
Singles	80	48	29	15	7	0	3	0
Doubles	80	48	29	15	0	—	—	—

== Singles main-draw entrants ==
=== Seeds ===
Country	Player	Rank^{1}	Seed
AUS	John Millman	142	1
POR	João Domingues	221	2
HUN	Attila Balázs	223	3
ITA	Andrea Arnaboldi	242	4
ESP	Jordi Samper-Montaña	244	5
TUR	Cem İlkel	254	6
TUR	Marsel İlhan	255	7
AUS	Blake Mott	256	8

- ^{1} Rankings as of May 15, 2017.

=== Other entrants ===
The following players received wildcards into the singles main draw:

- (Italy) Liam Caruana
- (Italy) Julian Ocleppo
- (Italy) Andrea Pellegrino
- (Italy) Matteo Viola

The following players received entry from the qualifying draw:

- (Italy) Gianluca Mager
- (Italy) Gianluigi Quinzi
- (Romania) Adrian Ungur
- (Estonia) Jürgen Zopp

== Champions ==
=== Singles ===
- (Portugal) João Domingues def. (Austria) Sebastian Ofner 7–6^{(7–4)}, 6–4.

=== Doubles ===
- (United Kingdom) Ken Skupski / (United Kingdom) Neal Skupski def. (Austria) Julian Knowle / (Slovakia) Igor Zelenay 5–7, 6–4, [10–5].
