= XVI Venice Challenge Save Cup =

- Date: 21–27 May
- Edition: 5th
- Draw: 32S / 16D
- Surface: Clay
- Location: Mestre, Italy

Champions

Singles
- (Italy) Gianluigi Quinzi

Doubles
- (Croatia) Marin Draganja / (Croatia) Tomislav Draganja
← XV ·	Venice Challenge Save Cup

The XVI Venice Challenge Save Cup was a professional tennis tournament played on clay courts. It was the 5th edition of the men's tournament which was part of the 2018 ATP Challenger Tour. It took place in Mestre, Italy between 21 and 27 May 2018.

== Singles main-draw entrants ==
=== Seeds ===
Country	Player	Rank^{1}	Seed
BEL	Arthur De Greef	222	1
SRB	Danilo Petrović	232	2
TPE	Yang Tsung-hua	240	3
ITA	Gianluigi Quinzi	247	4
BIH	Tomislav Brkić	250	5
USA	Mitchell Krueger	252	6
ITA	Lorenzo Giustino	255	7
ESP	Carlos Boluda-Purkiss	256	8

- ^{1} Rankings as of 14 May 2018.

=== Other entrants ===
The following players received wildcards into the singles main draw:

- (Italy) Andrea Arnaboldi
- (Italy) Filippo Baldi
- (Italy) Liam Caruana
- (Italy) Gian Marco Moroni

The following players received entry into the singles main draw as special exempts:

- (Italy) Luca Vanni
- (Spain) Mario Vilella Martínez

The following players received entry from the qualifying draw:

- (Italy) Edoardo Eremin
- (Italy) Federico Gaio
- (Italy) Roberto Marcora
- (Germany) Daniel Masur

== Champions ==
=== Singles ===
- (Italy) Gianluigi Quinzi def. (Italy) Gian Marco Moroni 6–2, 6–2.

=== Doubles ===
- (Croatia) Marin Draganja / (Croatia) Tomislav Draganja def. (Monaco) Romain Arneodo / (Serbia) Danilo Petrović 6–4, 6–7^{(2–7)}, [10–2].
