= XII Venice Challenge Save Cup – Singles =

Singles
- XII Venice Challenge Save Cup

Final
- Champion: (Uruguay) Pablo Cuevas
- Runner-up: (Italy) Marco Cecchinato
- Score: 6–4, 4–6, 6–2

Events
Singles	Doubles
Venice Challenge Save Cup	· XIII →

Pablo Cuevas won the title, defeating Marco Cecchinato in the final, 6–4, 4–6, 6–2.

== Seeds ==
1. (Italy) Paolo Lorenzi (semifinals)
2. (Spain) Daniel Gimeno Traver (semifinals)
3. (Italy) Filippo Volandri (second round)
4. (Tunisia) Malek Jaziri (first round)
5. (Argentina) Horacio Zeballos (first round)
6. (Uruguay) Pablo Cuevas (champion)
7. (Argentina) Facundo Bagnis (quarterfinals)
8. (Italy) Marco Cecchinato (final)

== Draw ==
=== Key ===
- Q = Qualifier
- WC = Wild card
- LL = Lucky loser
- Alt = Alternate
- SE = Special exempt
- PR = Protected ranking
- ITF = ITF entry
- JE = Junior exempt
- w/o = Walkover
- r = Retired
- d = Defaulted
- SR = Special ranking

=== Finals ===
Semifinals
1	(Italy) Paolo Lorenzi	3	3
6	(Uruguay) Pablo Cuevas	6	6
8/WC	(Italy) Marco Cecchinato	2	6	7^{9}
2	(Spain) Daniel Gimeno Traver	6	3	6^{7}

Final
6	(Uruguay) Pablo Cuevas	6	4	6
8/WC	(Italy) Marco Cecchinato	4	6	2

=== Top half ===
First round
1	(Italy) P Lorenzi	6	3	6
(Italy) L Giustino	2	6	3
(Argentina) A Molteni	0	6	4
(Italy) M Viola	6	4	6
(Japan) T Daniel	1	6	0
(Italy) T Fabbiano	6	3	6
Q	(Slovenia) J Semrajc	6	6
5/WC	(Argentina) H Zeballos	3	3
3	(Italy) F Volandri	6	7
(Belgium) N Desein	3	5
(Spain) J Checa-Calvo	2	6^{10}
(Argentina) A Collarini	6	7^{12}
WC	(Italy) S Caruso	6^{3}	3
Q	(Italy) A Giannessi	7^{7}	6
(Italy) G Naso	5	2
6	(Uruguay) P Cuevas	7	6

Second round
1	(Italy) P Lorenzi	7	6
(Italy) M Viola	5	4
(Italy) T Fabbiano	6	6
Q	(Slovenia) J Semrajc	4	0
3	(Italy) F Volandri	4	6	4
(Argentina) A Collarini	6	3	6
Q	(Italy) A Giannessi	0	4
6	(Uruguay) P Cuevas	6	6

Quarterfinals
1	(Italy) P Lorenzi	6	6
(Italy) T Fabbiano	1	3
(Argentina) A Collarini	1	3
6	(Uruguay) P Cuevas	6	6

Semifinals
1	(Italy) P Lorenzi	3	3
6	(Uruguay) P Cuevas	6	6

=== Bottom half ===
First round
8/WC	(Italy) M Cecchinato	2	6	6
Q	(Italy) R Marcora	6	3	0
(Argentina) JI Londero	4	6	6
WC	(Italy) S Travaglia	6	4	3
(Argentina) M Alund	5	3
(Italy) A Arnaboldi	7	6
Q	(Argentina) M Trungelliti	7^{7}	2	6
4	(Tunisia) M Jaziri	6^{4}	6	3
7	(Argentina) F Bagnis	3	6	6
(Hungary) M Fucsovics	6	3	3
(France) M Teixeira	6^{1}	3
(Germany) T Puetz	7^{7}	6
(Brazil) R Dutra da Silva	7	7^{8}
(Italy) P Starace	5	6^{6}
(Italy) F Cipolla	3	3
2	(Spain) D Gimeno Traver	6	6

Second round
8/WC	(Italy) M Cecchinato	6	6
(Argentina) JI Londero	1	4
(Italy) A Arnaboldi	6	6
Q	(Argentina) M Trungelliti	1	0
7	(Argentina) F Bagnis	6	6
(Germany) T Puetz	3	4
(Brazil) R Dutra da Silva	3	6	0
2	(Spain) D Gimeno Traver	6	3	6

Quarterfinals
8/WC	(Italy) M Cecchinato	6	7^{7}
(Italy) A Arnaboldi	2	6^{3}
7	(Argentina) F Bagnis	1	6^{8}
2	(Spain) D Gimeno Traver	6	7^{10}

Semifinals
8/WC	(Italy) M Cecchinato	2	6	7^{9}
2	(Spain) D Gimeno Traver	6	3	6^{7}
