= XIV Venice Challenge Save Cup – Doubles =

Doubles
- XIV Venice Challenge Save Cup

Final
- Champions: (Brazil) Fabrício Neis; (Brazil) Caio Zampieri
- Runners-up: (Germany) Kevin Krawietz; (Croatia) Dino Marcan
- Score: 7–6^{(7–3)}, 4–6, [12–10]

Events
Singles	Doubles
- Venice Challenge Save Cup

Flavio Cipolla and Potito Starace were the defending champions, but chose not to defend their title.

Fabrício Neis and Caio Zampieri won the title after defeating Kevin Krawietz and Dino Marcan 7–6^{(7–3)}, 4–6, [12–10] in the final.

== Seeds ==
1. (Australia) Rameez Junaid / (Austria) Philipp Oswald (semifinals)
2. (Mexico) Miguel Ángel Reyes-Varela / (Germany) Alexander Satschko (semifinals)
3. (Colombia) Nicolás Barrientos / (Uruguay) Ariel Behar (quarterfinals)
4. (Germany) Kevin Krawietz / (Croatia) Dino Marcan (final)

== Draw ==
Key

- Q = Qualifier
- WC = Wild card
- LL = Lucky loser
- Alt = Alternate
- ITF = ITF entry
- PR = Protected ranking
- SR = Special ranking
- SE = Special exempt
- JE = Junior exempt
- JR = Junior Accelerator Programme entrant
- CO = College Accelerator Programme entrant
- NG = Next Gen Accelerator Program entrant
- w/o = Walkover
- r = Retired
- d = Defaulted

First round

Quarterfinals

Semifinals

Final

1
- (Australia) R Junaid
- (Austria) P Oswald
3
6
[10]

- (Croatia) I Sabanov
- (Croatia) M Sabanov
6
3
[7]

1
- (Australia) R Junaid
- (Austria) P Oswald
6
5
[10]

- (Spain) O Roca Batalla
- (Netherlands) M Vervoort
2
5

- (Czech Republic) L Dlouhý
- (Czech Republic) R Jebavý
3
7
[7]

- (Czech Republic) L Dlouhý
- (Czech Republic) R Jebavý
6
7

1
- (Australia) R Junaid
- (Austria) P Oswald
2
3

3
- (Colombia) N Barrientos
- (Uruguay) A Behar
2
6
[10]

- (Brazil) F Neis
- (Brazil) C Zampieri
6
6

WC
- (Italy) M Bortolotti
- (Italy) S Caruso
6
4
[2]

3
- (Colombia) N Barrientos
- (Uruguay) A Behar
3
6^{2}

WC
(Italy) Omar Giacalone
(Italy) Pietro Rondoni
4
6^{5}

- (Brazil) F Neis
- (Brazil) C Zampieri
6
7^{7}

- (Brazil) F Neis
- (Brazil) C Zampieri
6
7^{7}

- (Brazil) F Neis
- (Brazil) C Zampieri
7^{7}
4
[12]

- (Canada) S Diez
- (Spain) G Granollers
6
6

4
- (Germany) K Krawietz
- (Croatia) D Marcan
6^{3}
6
[10]

- (Portugal) G Elias
- (Portugal) FF Silva
2
1

- (Canada) S Diez
- (Spain) G Granollers
6^{5}
5

- (Dominican Republic) J Hernández
- (Venezuela) LD Martínez
3
1

4
- (Germany) K Krawietz
- (Croatia) D Marcan
7^{7}
7

4
- (Germany) K Krawietz
- (Croatia) D Marcan
6
6

4
- (Germany) K Krawietz
- (Croatia) D Marcan
6
6

WC
- (Italy) W Trusendi
- (Italy) M Viola
6
6

2
- (Mexico) MÁ Reyes-Varela
- (Germany) A Satschko
3
4

- (Argentina) T Lipovšek Puches
- (Italy) A Motti
4
2

WC
- (Italy) W Trusendi
- (Italy) M Viola
4
1

- (France) C Lestienne
- (Portugal) G Oliveira
2
2

2
- (Mexico) MÁ Reyes-Varela
- (Germany) A Satschko
6
6

2
- (Mexico) MÁ Reyes-Varela
- (Germany) A Satschko
6
6
