= XV Venice Challenge Save Cup – Singles =

Singles
- XV Venice Challenge Save Cup

Final
- Champion: (Portugal) João Domingues
- Runner-up: (Austria) Sebastian Ofner
- Score: 7–6^{(7–4)}, 6–4

Events
Singles	Doubles
- Venice Challenge Save Cup

Gastão Elias was the defending champion but chose not to defend his title.

João Domingues won the title after defeating Sebastian Ofner 7–6^{(7–4)}, 6–4 in the final.

== Seeds ==
1. (Australia) John Millman (first round)
2. (Portugal) João Domingues (champion)
3. (Hungary) Attila Balázs (first round)
4. (Italy) Andrea Arnaboldi (first round)
5. (Spain) Jordi Samper-Montaña (first round)
6. (Turkey) Cem İlkel (second round)
7. (Turkey) Marsel İlhan (second round)
8. (Australia) Blake Mott (semifinals)

== Draw ==
Key

- Q = Qualifier
- WC = Wild card
- LL = Lucky loser
- Alt = Alternate
- ITF = ITF entry
- PR = Protected ranking
- SR = Special ranking
- SE = Special exempt
- JE = Junior exempt
- JR = Junior Accelerator Programme entrant
- CO = College Accelerator Programme entrant
- NG = Next Gen Accelerator Program entrant
- w/o = Walkover
- r = Retired
- d = Defaulted

=== Finals ===
Semifinals
(Czech Republic) Zdeněk Kolář	1	6^{4}
(Austria) Sebastian Ofner	6	7^{7}
8	(Australia) Blake Mott	0	2
2	(Portugal) João Domingues	6	6

Final
(Austria) Sebastian Ofner	6^{4}	4
2	(Portugal) João Domingues	7^{7}	6

=== Top half ===
First round
1	(Australia) J Millman	3	7	2
(Czech Republic) Z Kolář	6	5	6
(Belgium) M Authom	6	1	1
(Italy) A Bega	3	6	6
WC	(Italy) A Pellegrino	1	6^{3}
WC	(Italy) J Ocleppo	6	7^{7}
(Egypt) K-M Maamoun	1	4
6	(Turkey) C İlkel	6	6
3	(Hungary) A Balázs	4	4
WC	(Italy) L Caruana	6	6
(France) A Michon	6	6^{4}	7
(Belgium) Y Mertens	4	7^{7}	5
(Italy) L Sonego	3	4
Q	(Estonia) J Zopp	6	6
(Austria) S Ofner	6	6
5	(Spain) J Samper-Montaña	4	0

Second round
(Czech Republic) Z Kolář	6	6
(Italy) A Bega	4	2
WC	(Italy) J Ocleppo	6	7^{8}
6	(Turkey) C İlkel	4	6^{6}
WC	(Italy) L Caruana	6^{4}	4
(France) A Michon	7^{7}	6
Q	(Estonia) J Zopp	2	1
(Austria) S Ofner	6	6

Quarterfinals
(Czech Republic) Z Kolář	7	7
WC	(Italy) J Ocleppo	5	5
(France) A Michon	5	5
(Austria) S Ofner	7	7

Semifinals
(Czech Republic) Z Kolář	1	6^{4}
(Austria) S Ofner	6	7^{7}

=== Bottom half ===
First round
8	(Australia) B Mott	7	6
(India) P Gunneswaran	5	3
(United States) S Bangoura	4	1
(Netherlands) T Griekspoor	6	6
(South Africa) L Harris	4	2
Q	(Italy) G Quinzi	6	6
(Brazil) C Zampieri	6	4	7^{11}
4	(Italy) A Arnaboldi	4	6	6^{9}
7	(Turkey) M İlhan	6	6^{4}	6
(France) L Lokoli	4	7^{7}	1
Q	(Romania) A Ungur	6	4	2
WC	(Italy) M Viola	0	6	6
Q	(Italy) G Mager	7^{7}	6
(Germany) Marc Sieber	6^{4}	3
(Poland) K Majchrzak	6	3	4
2	(Portugal) J Domingues	2	6	6

Second round
8	(Australia) B Mott	7^{7}	6
(Netherlands) T Griekspoor	6^{3}	3
Q	(Italy) G Quinzi	6	6
(Brazil) C Zampieri	2	3
7	(Turkey) M İlhan	7	2	4
WC	(Italy) M Viola	5	6	6
Q	(Italy) G Mager	6	4	1
2	(Portugal) J Domingues	3	6	6

Quarterfinals
8	(Australia) B Mott	6	4
Q	(Italy) G Quinzi	2	2^{r}
WC	(Italy) M Viola	0	6	4
2	(Portugal) J Domingues	6	2	6

Semifinals
8	(Australia) B Mott	0	2
2	(Portugal) J Domingues	6	6
