= 2021 Open Sopra Steria de Lyon – Singles =

Singles
- 2021 Open Sopra Steria de Lyon

Final
- Champion: (Uruguay) Pablo Cuevas
- Runner-up: (Sweden) Elias Ymer
- Score: 6–2, 6–2

Events
Singles	Doubles
← 2019 ·	Open Sopra Steria de Lyon	· 2022 →

Corentin Moutet was the defending champion but chose not to defend his title.

Pablo Cuevas won the title after defeating Elias Ymer 6–2, 6–2 in the final.

== Seeds ==
1. (Uruguay) Pablo Cuevas (champion)
2. (Spain) Fernando Verdasco (second round)
3. (Argentina) Facundo Bagnis (semifinals)
4. (Colombia) Daniel Elahi Galán (second round)
5. (Japan) Taro Daniel (semifinals)
6. (France) Benjamin Bonzi (first round)
7. (Argentina) Francisco Cerúndolo (first round)
8. (Germany) Cedrik-Marcel Stebe (quarterfinals)

== Draw ==
=== Key ===
- Q = Qualifier
- WC = Wild card
- LL = Lucky loser
- Alt = Alternate
- SE = Special exempt
- PR = Protected ranking
- ITF = ITF entry
- JE = Junior exempt
- w/o = Walkover
- r = Retired
- d = Defaulted
- SR = Special ranking

=== Finals ===
Semifinals
1	(Uruguay) Pablo Cuevas	6	6
3	(Argentina) Facundo Bagnis	4	1
5	(Japan) Taro Daniel	4	2
(Sweden) Elias Ymer	6	6

Final
1	(Uruguay) Pablo Cuevas	6	6
(Sweden) Elias Ymer	2	2

=== Top half ===
First round
1	(Uruguay) P Cuevas	4	7^{7}	6
Q	(Argentina) P Cachin	6	6^{5}	2
(Portugal) J Domingues	3	6	4
WC	(France) K Jacquet	6	4	6
(Italy) A Pellegrino	6	0	6
Q	(Argentina) C Ugo Carabelli	4	6	4
(France) M Janvier	6	6
7	(Argentina) F Cerúndolo	3	3
3	(Argentina) F Bagnis	5	6	6
Q	(Russia) A Vatutin	7	3	2
(Argentina) M Trungelliti	6^{2}	2
(France) T Lamasine	7^{7}	6
WC	(France) M Martineau	4	2
(Argentina) TM Etcheverry	6	6
Q	(France) M Guinard	3	3
8	(Germany) C-M Stebe	6	6

Second round
1	(Uruguay) P Cuevas	6	6
WC	(France) K Jacquet	4	1
(Italy) A Pellegrino	7^{8}	3	6
(France) M Janvier	6^{6}	6	3
3	(Argentina) F Bagnis	6	6
(France) T Lamasine	4	0
(Argentina) TM Etcheverry	1	4
8	(Germany) C-M Stebe	6	6

Quarterfinals
1	(Uruguay) P Cuevas	6	7
(Italy) A Pellegrino	3	5
3	(Argentina) F Bagnis	6	7^{7}
8	(Germany) C-M Stebe	3	6^{5}

Semifinals
1	(Uruguay) P Cuevas	6	6
3	(Argentina) F Bagnis	4	1

=== Bottom half ===
First round
5	(Japan) T Daniel	6	6
(Argentina) A Collarini	3	2
(United States) B Fratangelo	6	6
LL	(Belgium) M Geerts	3	3
(Germany) D Altmaier	6	6
(France) A Müller	3	2
LL	(France) L Lokoli	2^{r}
4	(Colombia) DE Galán	5
6	(France) B Bonzi	6	6^{5}	4
(Germany) O Otte	4	7^{7}	6
(France) C Lestienne	4	0^{r}
(Sweden) E Ymer	6	0
WC	(France) T Droguet	6^{3}	6	4
SE	(Denmark) H Rune	7^{7}	1	6
(India) S Nagal	7^{7}	6^{3}	5
2	(Spain) F Verdasco	6^{5}	7^{7}	7

Second round
5	(Japan) T Daniel	6	6
(United States) B Fratangelo	3	4
(Germany) D Altmaier	6	3	7^{8}
4	(Colombia) DE Galán	4	6	6^{6}
(Germany) O Otte	4	4
(Sweden) E Ymer	6	6
SE	(Denmark) H Rune	6	6
2	(Spain) F Verdasco	4	3

Quarterfinals
5	(Japan) T Daniel	7^{7}	6^{2}	6
(Germany) D Altmaier	6^{3}	7^{7}	3
(Sweden) E Ymer	6	5
SE	(Denmark) H Rune	3	3^{r}

Semifinals
5	(Japan) T Daniel	4	2
(Sweden) E Ymer	6	6
