= XV Venice Challenge Save Cup – Doubles =

Doubles
- XV Venice Challenge Save Cup

Final
- Champions: (United Kingdom) Ken Skupski (United Kingdom) Neal Skupski
- Runners-up: (Austria) Julian Knowle (Slovakia) Igor Zelenay
- Score: 5–7, 6–4, [10–5]

Events
Singles	Doubles
- Venice Challenge Save Cup

Fabrício Neis and Caio Zampieri were the defending champions but chose to defend their title with different partners. Neis partnered Guillermo Durán but lost in the semifinals to Ken and Neal Skupski. Zampieri partnered Sergio Galdós but lost in the first round to Julian Ocleppo and Andrea Pellegrino.

Skupski and Skupski won the title after defeating Julian Knowle and Igor Zelenay 5–7, 6–4, [10–5] in the final.

== Seeds ==
1. (Austria) Julian Knowle / (Slovakia) Igor Zelenay (final)
2. (United Kingdom) Ken Skupski / (United Kingdom) Neal Skupski (champions)
3. (Argentina) Guillermo Durán / (Brazil) Fabrício Neis (semifinals)
4. (Peru) Sergio Galdós / (Brazil) Caio Zampieri (first round)

== Draw ==
Key

- Q = Qualifier
- WC = Wild card
- LL = Lucky loser
- Alt = Alternate
- ITF = ITF entry
- PR = Protected ranking
- SR = Special ranking
- SE = Special exempt
- JE = Junior exempt
- JR = Junior Accelerator Programme entrant
- CO = College Accelerator Programme entrant
- NG = Next Gen Accelerator Program entrant
- w/o = Walkover
- r = Retired
- d = Defaulted

First round
1	(Austria) J Knowle (Slovakia) I Zelenay	3	6	[12]
(Belgium) S Gillé (Belgium) J Vliegen	6	4	[10]
(United Kingdom) L Bambridge (Australia) Jarryd Chaplin	1	4
(Sweden) I Arvidsson (United States) M Schnur	6	6
4	(Peru) S Galdós (Brazil) C Zampieri	6	3	[6]
WC	(Italy) J Ocleppo (Italy) A Pellegrino	4	6	[10]
(Chinese Taipei) C-p Hsieh (Australia) R Junaid	6	3	[7]
(United States) S Bangoura (New Zealand) B McLachlan	4	6	[10]
WC	(Italy) W Trusendi (Italy) M Viola	6	6
WC	(Italy) G Mager (Italy) L Sonego	4	0
(Italy) A Arnaboldi (Italy) A Motti	4	3
3	(Argentina) G Durán (Brazil) F Neis	6	6
PR	(Italy) F Cipolla (Croatia) A Šančić	2	6	[6]
(Poland) T Bednarek (Croatia) T Draganja	6	4	[10]
(Germany) A Mies (South Africa) R Roelofse	3	6^{4}
2	(United Kingdom) K Skupski (United Kingdom) N Skupski	6	7^{7}

Quarterfinals
1	(Austria) J Knowle (Slovakia) I Zelenay	6	6
(Sweden) I Arvidsson (United States) M Schnur	3	4
WC	(Italy) J Ocleppo (Italy) A Pellegrino	3	3
(United States) S Bangoura (New Zealand) B McLachlan	6	6
WC	(Italy) W Trusendi (Italy) M Viola	2	3
3	(Argentina) G Durán (Brazil) F Neis	6	6
(Poland) T Bednarek (Croatia) T Draganja	5	1
2	(United Kingdom) K Skupski (United Kingdom) N Skupski	7	6

Semifinals
1	(Austria) J Knowle (Slovakia) I Zelenay	4	6	[10]
(United States) S Bangoura (New Zealand) B McLachlan	6	1	[6]
3	(Argentina) G Durán (Brazil) F Neis	3	6^{5}
2	(United Kingdom) K Skupski (United Kingdom) N Skupski	6	7^{7}

Final
1	(Austria) J Knowle (Slovakia) I Zelenay	7	4	[5]
2	(United Kingdom) K Skupski (United Kingdom) N Skupski	5	6	[10]
