= XIV Venice Challenge Save Cup =

- Date: 16–22 May
- Edition: 3rd
- Draw: 32S / 16D
- Prize money: €42,500
- Surface: Clay
- Location: Mestre, Italy

Champions

Singles
- (Portugal) Gastão Elias

Doubles
- (Brazil) Fabrício Neis / (Brazil) Caio Zampieri
← XIII ·	Venice Challenge Save Cup	· XV →

The XIV Venice Challenge Save Cup was a professional tennis tournament played on clay courts. It was the 3rd edition of the men's tournament which was part of the 2016 ATP Challenger Tour. It took place in Mestre, Italy between 16 and 22 May 2016.

== Singles main-draw entrants ==
=== Seeds ===
Country	Player	Rank^{1}	Seed
ITA	Paolo Lorenzi	53	1
SRB	Dušan Lajović	70	2
ARG	Horacio Zeballos	90	3
POR	Gastão Elias	92	4
FRA	Constant Lestienne	210	5
POR	Frederico Ferreira Silva	243	6
CAN	Steven Diez	247	7
ITA	Salvatore Caruso	251	8

- ^{1} Rankings as of May 9, 2016.

=== Other entrants ===
The following players received wildcards into the singles main draw:

- (Italy) Edoardo Eremin
- (Italy) Gianluca Mager
- (Italy) Stefano Napolitano
- (Italy) Lorenzo Sonego

The following player entered the main draw as an alternate:

- (Portugal) Gastão Elias

The following players received entry from the qualifying draw:

- (Chile) Nicolás Jarry
- (Czech Republic) Marek Michalička
- (Germany) Daniel Masur
- (Serbia) Danilo Petrović

== Champions ==
=== Singles ===
- (Portugal) Gastão Elias def. (Argentina) Horacio Zeballos, 7–6^{(7–0)}, 6–2

=== Doubles ===
- (Brazil) Fabrício Neis / (Brazil) Caio Zampieri def. (Germany) Kevin Krawietz / (Croatia) Dino Marcan, 7–6^{(7–3)}, 4–6, [12–10]
