= 2021 Open Sopra Steria de Lyon – Doubles =

Doubles
- 2021 Open Sopra Steria de Lyon

Final
- Champions: (Uruguay) Martín Cuevas (Uruguay) Pablo Cuevas
- Runners-up: (France) Tristan Lamasine (France) Albano Olivetti
- Score: 6–3, 7–6^{(7–2)}

Events
Singles	Doubles
← 2019 ·	Open Sopra Steria de Lyon	· 2022 →

Philipp Oswald and Filip Polášek were the defending champions but chose not to defend their title.

Martín and Pablo Cuevas won the title after defeating Tristan Lamasine and Albano Olivetti 6–3, 7–6^{(7–2)} in the final.

== Seeds ==
1. (Brazil) Fernando Romboli / (Spain) David Vega Hernández (semifinals)
2. (United States) Evan King / (United States) Hunter Reese (first round)
3. (France) Sadio Doumbia / (France) Fabien Reboul (first round)
4. (Poland) Szymon Walków / (Poland) Jan Zieliński (semifinals)

== Draw ==
=== Key ===
- Q = Qualifier
- WC = Wild card
- LL = Lucky loser
- Alt = Alternate
- SE = Special exempt
- PR = Protected ranking
- ITF = ITF entry
- JE = Junior exempt
- w/o = Walkover
- r = Retired
- d = Defaulted
- SR = Special ranking

First round
1	(Brazil) F Romboli (Spain) D Vega Hernández	6	6
(France) M Guinard (France) M Janvier	2	4
Alt	(Belgium) M Geerts (Russia) A Vatutin	6^{4}	3
WC	(France) T Droguet (France) J Eysseric	7^{7}	6
3	(France) S Doumbia (France) F Reboul	4	3
(France) T Lamasine (France) A Olivetti	6	6
WC	(France) G Blancaneaux (France) M Martineau	2	4
Alt	(Italy) M Bortolotti (Romania) VV Cornea	6	6
WC	(France) U Blanchet (France) K Jacquet	6	7^{9}
(Argentina) A Collarini (Peru) S Galdós	2	6^{7}
(Poland) K Drzewiecki (Spain) S Martos Gornés	6	5	[7]
4	(Poland) S Walków (Poland) J Zieliński	4	7	[10]
(Uruguay) M Cuevas (Uruguay) P Cuevas	6^{4}	7^{7}	[10]
(Argentina) P Cachin (Argentina) C Ugo Carabelli	7^{7}	6^{4}	[4]
(Argentina) F Cerúndolo (India) S Nagal	4	7	[17]
2	(United States) E King (United States) H Reese	6	5	[15]

Quarterfinals
1	(Brazil) F Romboli (Spain) D Vega Hernández	7^{10}	6^{4}	[10]
WC	(France) T Droguet (France) J Eysseric	6^{8}	7^{7}	[5]
(France) T Lamasine (France) A Olivetti	6	6
Alt	(Italy) M Bortolotti (Romania) VV Cornea	3	3
WC	(France) U Blanchet (France) K Jacquet	6^{3}	2
4	(Poland) S Walków (Poland) J Zieliński	7^{7}	6
(Uruguay) M Cuevas (Uruguay) P Cuevas	6	6
(Argentina) F Cerúndolo (India) S Nagal	3	2

Semifinals
1	(Brazil) F Romboli (Spain) D Vega Hernández	1	6	[9]
(France) T Lamasine (France) A Olivetti	6	0	[11]
4	(Poland) S Walków (Poland) J Zieliński	6^{5}	7^{7}	[8]
(Uruguay) M Cuevas (Uruguay) P Cuevas	7^{7}	6^{1}	[10]

Final
(France) T Lamasine (France) A Olivetti	3	6^{2}
(Uruguay) M Cuevas (Uruguay) P Cuevas	6	7^{7}
