= Gian Marco Moroni =

Italian tennis player

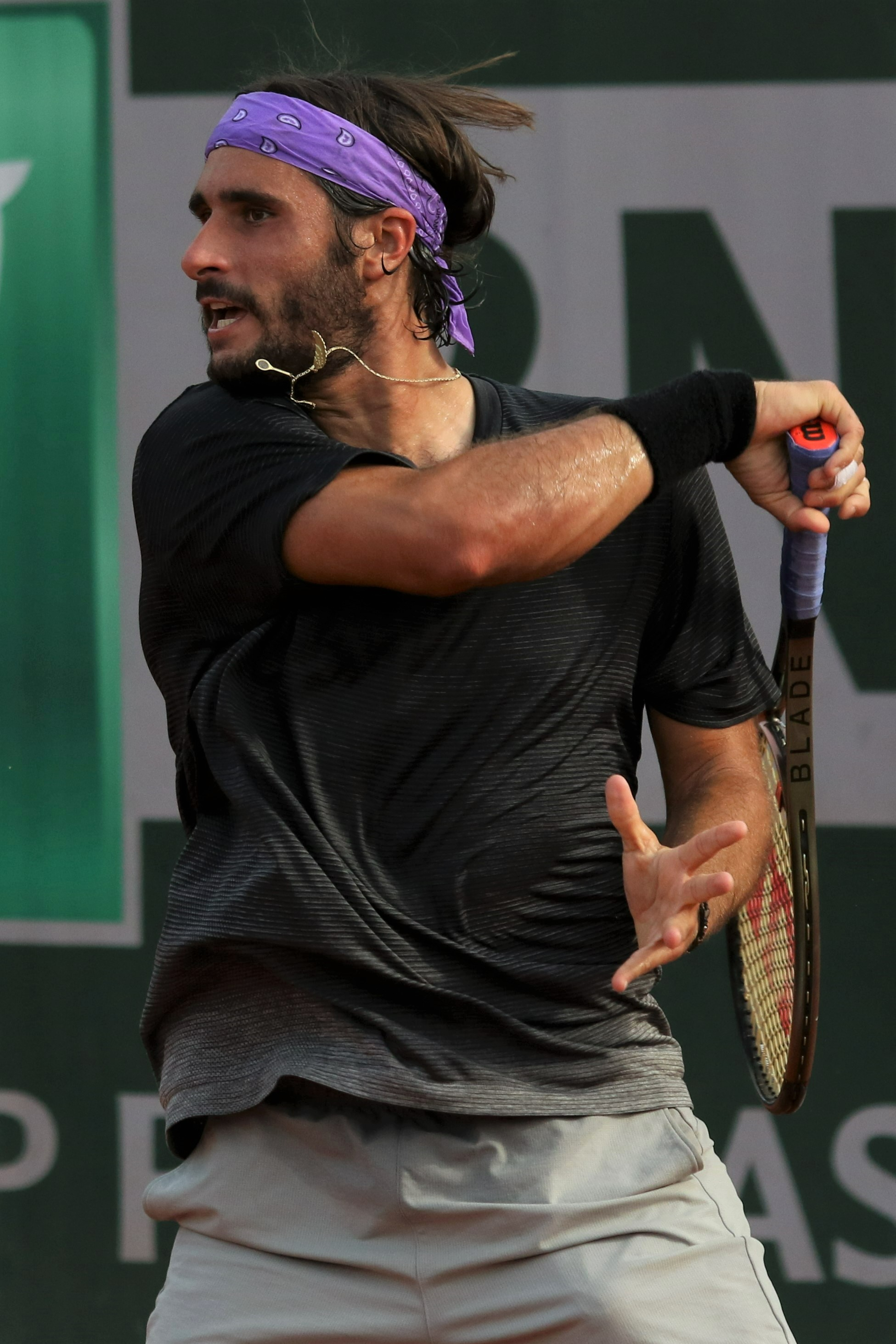
- Moroni at the 2022 French Open
- Country (sports): Italy
- Residence: Roquebrune-Cap-Martin, France
- Born: 13 February 1998 (age 28) Rome, Italy
- Height: 1.85 m (6 ft 1 in)
- Turned pro: 2018
- Plays: Right-handed (one-handed backhand)
- Coach: Federico Torresi; Fabio Gorietti; Riccardo Maiga
- Prize money: US $356,871

Singles
- Career record: 1–3
- Career titles: 0
- Highest ranking: No. 159 (13 June 2022)

Grand Slam singles results
- Australian Open: Q2 (2021, 2022)
- French Open: Q2 (2020, 2022)
- US Open: Q2 (2021)

Doubles
- Career record: 0–0
- Career titles: 0
- Highest ranking: No. 327 (20 May 2019)

Gian Marco Moroni (born 13 February 1998) is an Italian professional tennis player. He has a career-high ATP singles ranking of world No. 159 achieved on 13 June 2022 and a career-high ATP doubles ranking of world No. 327 achieved on 20 May 2019. He has reached seven career singles finals, with a record of two wins and five losses, including a 1–4 record in ATP Challenger finals. Additionally, he has reached one career doubles final, in which he finished runner-up, at the ITF Futures level.

== Career ==
=== 2019: ATP debut ===
Moroni made his ATP main draw debut at the 2019 Swiss Open Gstaad after qualifying for the singles main draw. He defeated Luca Margaroli 6–3, 6–4 and Marco Trungelliti 6–3, 6–2 during qualifying rounds and then upset veteran Spaniard Tommy Robredo in the first round with a 6–2, 6–2 straight sets victory. He was ultimately eliminated in the second round by fifth seed and eventual semi-finalist João Sousa 4–6, 4–6.

== Challenger and Futures finals ==
=== Singles: 7 (2–5) ===
Legend (singles) ATP Challenger Tour (1–4) ITF Futures Tour (1–1)	Titles by surface Hard (0–0) Clay (2–5) Grass (0–0) Carpet (0–0)

Result	W–L	Date	Tournament	Tier	Surface	Opponent	Score
Loss	0–1	Aug 2017	Serbia F3, Subotica	Futures	Clay	(Austria) Dennis Novak	3–6, 7–6^{(7–4)}, 2–6
Win	1–1	Mar 2018	Spain F7, Reus	Futures	Clay	(Spain) Pol Toledo Bagué	6–3, 6–1
Loss	1–2	May 2018	Mestre, Italy	Challenger	Clay	(Italy) Gianluigi Quinzi	2–6, 2–6
Loss	1–3	May 2019	Rome, Italy	Challenger	Clay	(Switzerland) Henri Laaksonen	7–6^{(7–2)}, 6–7^{(2–7)}, 2–6
Win	2–3	Jun 2021	Milan, Italy	Challenger	Clay	(Argentina) Federico Coria	6-3, 6-2
Loss	2–4	Aug 2021	Como, Italy	Challenger	Clay	(Argentina) Juan Manuel Cerúndolo	5-7, 6-7^{(7-9)}
Loss	2–5	Apr 2022	Rome, Italy	Challenger	Clay	(Italy) Franco Agamenone	1-6, 4-6

=== Doubles: 1 (0–1) ===
Legend (doubles) ATP Challenger Tour (0–0) ITF Futures Tour (0–1)	Titles by surface Hard (0–0) Clay (0–1) Grass (0–0) Carpet (0–0)

Result	W–L	Date	Tournament	Tier	Surface	Partner	Opponents	Score
Loss	0–1	Oct 2015	Italy F32, Santa Margherita di Pula	Futures	Clay	(Italy) Gianluca Di Nicola	(Italy) Pietro Licciardi (Italy) Lorenzo Sonego	6–7^{(5–7)}, 3–6

== Performance timeline ==
Key
W	F	SF	QF	#R	RR	Q#	DNQ	A	NH

(W) winner; (F) finalist; (SF) semifinalist; (QF) quarterfinalist; (#R) rounds 4, 3, 2, 1; (RR) round-robin stage; (Q#) qualification round; (DNQ) did not qualify; (A) absent; (NH) not held; (SR) strike rate (events won / competed); (W–L) win–loss record.
To avoid confusion and double counting, these charts are updated at the conclusion of a tournament or when the player's participation has ended.

=== Singles ===
Tournament	2018	2019	2020	2021	2022	SR	W–L	Win %
Grand Slam tournaments
Australian Open	A	Q1	A	Q2	Q2	0 / 0	0–0	–
French Open	A	A	Q2	A	Q2	0 / 0	0–0	–
Wimbledon	A	A	NH	A	A	0 / 0	0–0	–
US Open	Q1	A	A	Q2	Q1	0 / 0	0–0	–
Win–loss	0–0	0–0	0–0	0–0	0–0	0 / 0	0–0	–
ATP Tour Masters 1000
Italian Open	A	A	Q1	A		0 / 0	0–0	–
Win–loss	0–0	0–0	0–0	0–0	0–0	0 / 0	0–0	–
