= Pablo Cuevas =

Uruguayan tennis player (born 1986)

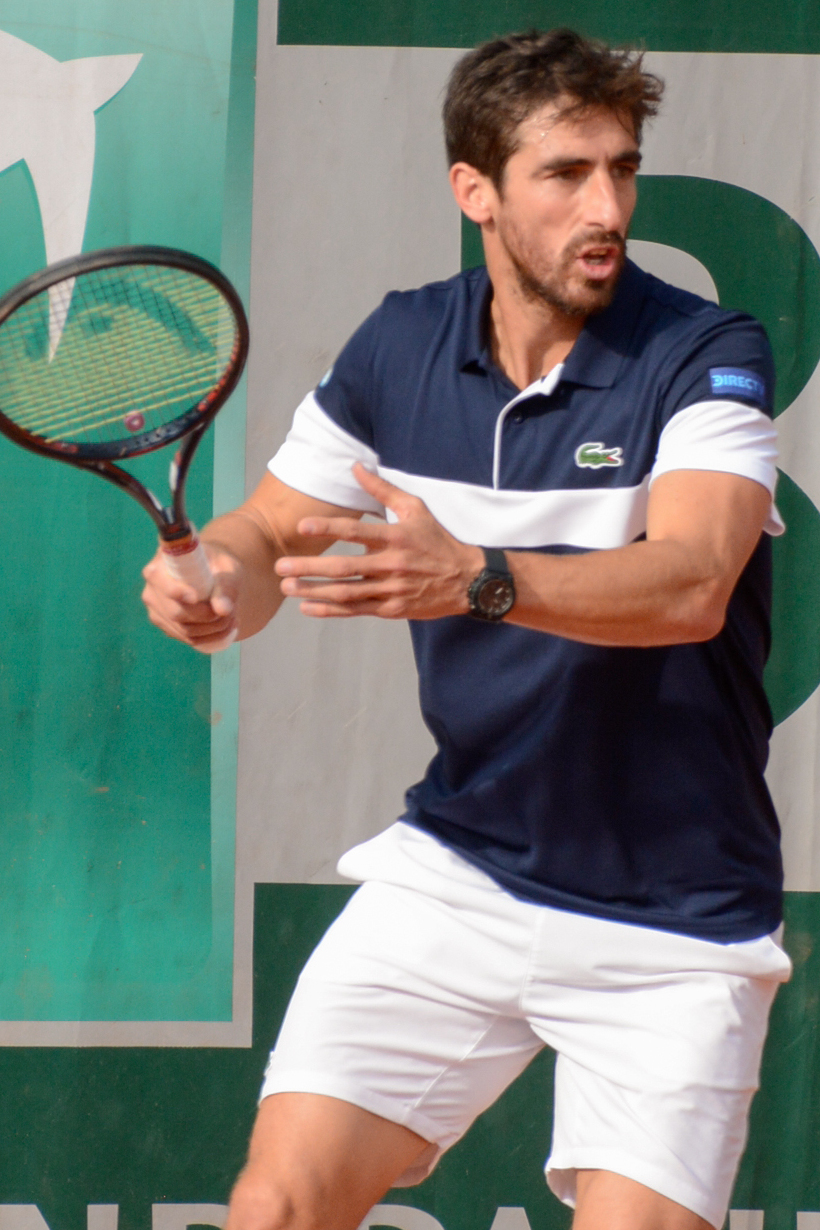
- Cuevas at the 2019 French Open
- Country (sports): Uruguay
- Residence: Salto, Uruguay
- Born: 1 January 1986 (age 40) Concordia, Argentina
- Height: 1.80 m (5 ft 11 in)
- Turned pro: 2004
- Retired: 2024
- Plays: Right-handed (one-handed backhand)
- Coach: Facundo Savio
- Prize money: US $9,742,624

Singles
- Career record: 242–224
- Career titles: 6
- Highest ranking: No. 19 (15 August 2016)

Grand Slam singles results
- Australian Open: 2R (2016, 2018, 2019, 2021)
- French Open: 3R (2015, 2016, 2017, 2019)
- Wimbledon: 2R (2009, 2019)
- US Open: 2R (2009, 2010, 2015, 2016, 2019)

Other tournaments
- Olympic Games: 2R (2016)

Doubles
- Career record: 217–177
- Career titles: 9
- Highest ranking: No. 14 (20 April 2009)

Grand Slam doubles results
- Australian Open: SF (2016)
- French Open: W (2008)
- Wimbledon: 3R (2014, 2016)
- US Open: 3R (2009, 2013)

Other doubles tournaments
- Tour Finals: SF (2008)

Grand Slam mixed doubles results
- Australian Open: SF (2015)
- US Open: QF (2010)

Pablo Gabriel Cuevas Urroz (Spanish pronunciation: [ˈpaβlo ˈkweβas]; born 1 January 1986) is a Uruguayan tennis coach and a former professional player. Cuevas won the 2008 French Open men's doubles title with Luis Horna, and was especially noted throughout his career for spectacular trickshots.

Cuevas won six singles titles and had a career-high singles ranking of world No. 19, achieved in August 2016. His career-high doubles ranking was No. 14, achieved in April 2009.

In September 2019, Cuevas led the Uruguayan Davis Cup team to a victory over the Dominican Republic, winning entry into the highest Davis Cup tier, the World Group.

== Professional career ==
=== Early career ===
At the 2007 French Open, Cuevas and Argentine partner Carlos Berlocq made the third round of the men's doubles tournament. Cuevas won the Tunica, Scheveningen, and Lima singles Challenger titles, and the São Paulo-1 and Florianópolis-2 doubles Challenger titles.

=== 2008 ===
Cuevas opened the year at the Movistar Open in Viña del Mar, Chile. He earned his first tour-level victory in his first-round match against Guillermo Coria. He then beat Fernando Verdasco and José Acasuso, before falling in the semifinals against Fernando González. Cuevas reached his career-high singles ranking of no. 88 following Viña del Mar.

In March, Cuevas qualified for the Sony Ericsson Open in Miami, his first ATP Masters Series event. He defeated Vince Spadea in the first round, before falling to Fernando González in the second round. At Houston, he partnered with Spaniard Marcel Granollers to reach the doubles final, falling to Ernests Gulbis and Rainer Schüttler.

At the 2008 French Open in May, Cuevas partnered with Peruvian Luis Horna to win the doubles title. On their way to the title, the pair defeated seventh seeds Arnaud Clément and Michaël Llodra in the first round, ninth seeds Lukáš Dlouhý and Leander Paes in the third round, top seeds Bob and Mike Bryan in the quarterfinals, and second-seeded Daniel Nestor and Nenad Zimonjić in the final. They defeated Nestor and Zimonjić 6–2, 6–3, in only 56 minutes to win the title. Cuevas and Horna became the first all-South American team to win a Grand Slam men's doubles title, and Cuevas became the second Uruguayan, after Fiorella Bonicelli, to win a Grand Slam title in the Open Era.

=== 2009 ===
At the 2009 Movistar Open in Viña del Mar, Cuevas, as in 2008, reached the semifinals in singles, where he met local favorite Fernando González. González won the match 6–3, 6–2. In doubles, Cuevas paired with Argentinean Brian Dabul, and together they won the tournament, winning the final against František Čermák and Michal Mertiňák, 6–3, 6–3. This win helped Cuevas achieve his doubles ranking high of no. 17 in the world on February 9, 2009.

In the first round at Wimbledon in 2009, Cuevas defeated Christophe Rochus of Belgium in a come-from-behind victory, 3–6, 4–6, 6–4, 6–1, 11–9. In the second round, he lost to 21-year-old Jesse Levine of the U.S. (who defeated Marat Safin in the first round), 6–2, 6–1, 4–6, 4–6, 6–3.

Cuevas qualified into the 2009 International German Open. He reached the semifinals of that tournament by beating Björn Phau, ninth-seeded Jürgen Melzer, eighth-seeded Philipp Kohlschreiber, and 14th-seeded Nicolás Almagro in the quarterfinals. He lost his semifinal match with Paul-Henri Mathieu, 6–4, 3–6, 5–7.

Cuevas played in the 2009 Kremlin Cup as fifth seed. He advanced to the quarterfinals by defeating Lu Yen-hsun and Teymuraz Gabashvili. He lost in the quarterfinals to Mikhail Kukushkin, 6–4, 1–6, 4–6. He did, however, win the doubles title, partnering Marcel Granollers.

=== 2010 ===
Cuevas defeated eight-seeded Albert Montañés at the 2010 Abierto Mexicano Telcel to reach quarter-finals, where he lost to David Ferrer. At the 2010 Kremlin Cup he beat world number 11 Nikolay Davydenko in second round and fifth-seeded Radek Štěpánek in quarter-finals, then was defeated by eventual champion Viktor Troicki.

=== 2011 ===
He went 0–4 at the start of 2011, but on arrival at the Sony Ericsson Open in Miami, he defeated both Michael Berrer and world number 8 Andy Roddick by the same score, 6–4, 7–6, to reach the third round.

At the 2011 U.S. Men's Clay Court Championships, Cuevas beat third seeded Guillermo García López to reach semi-finals, where he lost to Kei Nishikori.

At the 2011 Estoril Open he defeated third-seeded Jo-Wilfried Tsonga and sixth-seeded Thomaz Bellucci in consecutive matches to reach the semifinals, where he lost to Juan Martín del Potro.

After losing in first round of Roland Garros, Cuevas underwent knee surgery and did not play on tour for two years.

=== 2012–13 ===
Cuevas did not play at all in 2012 due to injury.

The Uruguayan played again in ATP Challenger Tour events in May 2013. He won the first round match at Roland Garros. Later he defeated eight-seeded Nikolay Davydenko at first round of the 2013 Proton Malaysian Open.

=== 2014 ===
In 2014, Cuevas won the first round matches at the Rio Open, Portugal Open and Roland Garros. At the Swedish Open, he beat sixth-seeded Jérémy Chardy, third-seeded Fernando Verdasco and fifth-seeded João Sousa to win his first ATP 250 tournament and became number 61 in the ATP ranking.

One week later, he won his second ATP tournament at the Umag Croatia Open. Cuevas had to play the qualifying round, defeating Nikolas Walterscheid-Tukic, Nikola Ćaćić and Renzo Olivo. In the main tournament, he beat Croatian Mate Delić 4–6, 6–4, 6–4, then Italian Andreas Seppi 6–3, 6–1, Russian Teymuraz Gabashvili 6–3, 4–6, 6–2 in the quarterfinals, and finally, on Sunday, he beat Fabio Fognini in semifinals, and second-seeded Tommy Robredo in the finals, without losing a set, 6–3, 6–4. After the tournament he rose to inside the world's top 40 in the ATP rankings for the first time in his career.

In November, the Uruguayan won the Challenger Ciudad de Guayaquil and Uruguay Open singles clay tournaments.

=== 2015 ===
At the 2015 Australian Open, Cuevas lost in first round to unseeded player Matthias Bachinger. In the doubles event, he partnered David Marrero to reach quarterfinals, where they were beaten by Fabio Fognini and Simone Bolelli.

He began the Latin American season with his third ATP singles title at the ATP 250 São Paulo, after beating Jiří Veselý, Nicolás Almagro, and Santiago Giraldo. Later he beat Almgaro again, and then Albert Montañés to reach the third round of the Rio 500, where he was defeated by clay master Rafael Nadal in three sets. Also, together with Marrero, he beat Vesely and František Čermák to reach the quarterfinals of the doubles event.

At the ATP 250 Buenos Aires, he lost to local Juan Mónaco in quarterfinals. Cuevas then played the Davis Cup Americas Zone round versus Colombia, where he lost to Alejandro González and defeated Giraldo. He partnered his brother Martín to defeat doubles specialists Juan Sebastián Cabal and Robert Farah.

At the Indian Wells Masters, Cuevas defeated Jarkko Nieminen to reach the third round, where he lost to Feliciano López. This was his best singles result in big tournaments since his third-round appearance at the 2011 Miami Masters. In the doubles event, he lost in the first round to Nadal and Pablo Carreño Busta. Cuevas lost in second round of the Miami Masters to Thomaz Bellucci.

At the inaugural ATP 250 Istanbul Open, as the third seed, first defeating Teymuraz Gabashvili, Thomaz Bellucci, and Grigor Dimitrov, the second seed, to reach his fourth ATP Tour level final, where he lost to Roger Federer.

=== 2016 ===
He won the 2016 Rio Open by defeating Rafael Nadal in the semifinals and Argentine Guido Pella in the final. The next week, he won the Brasil Open in São Paulo by defeating Spaniard Pablo Carreño Busta in the final. He was the runner up at the 2016 Nottingham Open to Steve Johnson. He was runner up at the 2016 German Open to Martin Kližan. Cuevas struggled to put together wins over the rest of the year, falling in the second round at the 2016 Rio Olympics and the 2016 US Open.

=== 2017 ===
Cuevas went 1–4 to start 2017, including a first-round loss at the 2017 Australian Open, but he rebounded with a title at the 2017 Brasil Open where he defeated Albert Ramos Viñolas. He followed that with a strong quarterfinal appearance at the 2017 Indian Wells Masters. As the No. 27 seed, he defeated Martin Kližan, Fabio Fognini, and No. 11 seed David Goffin before falling to Pablo Carreño Busta. He followed that up with another Masters-level quarterfinal appearance at the 2017 Monte-Carlo Masters, where he defeated No. 3 seed Stan Wawrinka in straight sets. He lost to Lucas Pouille in the quarterfinals. At the same tournament, he won his second Masters 1000 doubles title partnering with Rohan Bopanna defeating 7th seeded Spanish duo of F. Lopez/M. Lopez.

His strong results on clay continued at the 2017 Mutua Madrid Open, where he reached the first Masters semifinal of his career. Cuevas defeated Thomaz Bellucci, Nicolas Mahut, Benoît Paire, and Alexander Zverev to reach the semifinals. World No. 9 Dominic Thiem ended his run with a 6–4, 6–4 win. Cuevas would make the third round of the 2017 French Open later that spring. He then lost his next nine matches before ending the year with a third-round appearance in the 2017 Rolex Paris Masters, where he lost to Rafael Nadal in three sets.

=== 2018–19 ===
Cuevas defeated world number 6 Dominic Thiem in the third round of 2018 Indian Wells. He lost in the fourth round to Hyeon Chung in straight sets. At the 2018 Madrid Open, he made it to the third round before being defeated by world No. 9 John Isner in three tiebreaks.

Cuevas broke his foot in the summer which limited his activity for the rest of the 2018 season.

Cuevas won his first Challenger title in almost two years at the 2019 Tunis Open. Three weeks later, he would win another one at the 2019 Open du Pays d'Aix. At the 2019 Estoril Open, Cuevas qualified for the main draw as a lucky loser and made it all the way to the finals before being defeated by top seed and world number 10 Stefanos Tsitsipas in straight sets.

At the French Open, Cuevas made the third round to match his best result at the tournament for the fourth time before being defeated by world No. 4 Dominic Thiem.

=== 2020 ===
Cuevas was part of team Uruguay for the inaugural 2020 ATP Cup but lost all of his matches to Japan'sYoshihito Nishioka, Spain's Rafael Nadal, and Georgia's Nikoloz Basilashvili.

Cuevas made back-to-back quarterfinals at Córdoba and Buenos Aires. He lost to eventual champion Cristian Garín in Córdoba and had four match points against top seed Diego Schwartzman in Buenos Aires, but fell short.

=== 2021 ===
Cuevas qualified for the main draw at the Geneva Open. There, he made it to the semifinals defeating top players such as Reilly Opelka and 4th seed and former world number 3 Grigor Dimitrov. He lost to 2nd seed Denis Shapovalov in straight sets.

At the French Open, he played world number 1 Novak Djokovic in the second round. He lost in straight sets.

At the 2021 Open Sopra Steria de Lyon, Cuevas won both the singles and the doubles events along with his brother Martín Cuevas.

=== 2022 ===
At the 2022 French Open he defeated 31st seed Jenson Brooksby. In the summer, Cuevas decided to spend time with his family and think about what to do next with his career. He felt good and started training again in Buenos Aires to prepare himself for the 2023 French Open.

=== 2023–24 ===
He entered several Grand Slam qualifying competitions using a protected ranking: 2023 French Open, 2023 Wimbledon Championships, 2024 Australian Open and the 2024 US Open.

In September 2024, Cuevas announced his retirement from professional tennis.

== Davis Cup ==
Cuevas made his debut for the Uruguay Davis Cup team in April 2004 at the age of 18. He is 29–7 in Davis Cup singles matches and 13–5 in Davis Cup doubles matches combining for an overall record of 42–12.

== Playing style ==
Pablo Cuevas has a clay-court style of play. He utilizes heavy topspin off his forehand side and plays a one-handed backhand. His one-handed backhand creates excellent angles to hit passing shots. Cuevas also has a good slice. For most of his serves, he uses a heavy kick serve. Most of his skill set was on display when he defeated Andy Roddick in Miami in 2011. Cuevas is also known for trickshots.

== Performance timelines ==
Key
W	F	SF	QF	#R	RR	Q#	P#	DNQ	A	Z#	PO	G	S	B	NMS	NTI	P	NH

(W) winner; (F) finalist; (SF) semifinalist; (QF) quarterfinalist; (#R) rounds 4, 3, 2, 1; (RR) round-robin stage; (Q#) qualification round; (P#) preliminary round; (DNQ) did not qualify; (A) absent; (Z#) Davis/Fed Cup Zonal Group (with number indication) or (PO) play-off; (G) gold, (S) silver or (B) bronze Olympic/Paralympic medal; (NMS) not a Masters tournament; (NTI) not a Tier I tournament; (P) postponed; (NH) not held; (SR) strike rate (events won / competed); (W–L) win–loss record.
To avoid confusion and double counting, these charts are updated at the conclusion of a tournament or when the player's participation has ended.

=== Singles ===
Current through the 2022 U.S. Men's Clay Court Championships.

Tournament	2004	2005	2006	2007	2008	2009	2010	2011	2012	2013	2014	2015	2016	2017	2018	2019	2020	2021	2022	2023	2024	SR	W–L	Win%
Grand Slam tournaments
Australian Open	A	A	A	A	A	A	1R	1R	A	A	A	1R	2R	1R	2R	2R	1R	2R	A	A	Q1	0 / 9	4–9	31%
French Open	A	A	A	Q3	1R	Q3	1R	1R	A	2R	2R	3R	3R	3R	2R	3R	2R	2R	2R	Q1	A	0 / 13	14–13	52%
Wimbledon	A	A	A	A	A	2R	A	A	A	A	1R	1R	1R	A	1R	2R	NH	1R	A	Q2	A	0 / 7	2–7	22%
US Open	A	A	A	1R	1R	2R	2R	A	A	1R	1R	2R	2R	1R	A	2R	1R	1R	A	A	Q1	0 / 12	5–12	29%
Win–loss	0–0	0–0	0–0	0–1	0–2	2–2	1–3	0–2	0–0	1–2	1–3	3–4	4–4	2–3	2–3	5–4	1–3	2–4	1–1			0 / 41	25–41	38%
ATP Masters 1000
Indian Wells Masters	A	A	A	A	A	A	2R	2R	A	A	A	3R	2R	QF	4R	A	NH	A	1R	A	A	0 / 7	8–7	53%
Miami Open	A	A	A	A	2R	A	1R	3R	A	A	A	2R	3R	2R	A	1R	NH	A	A	A	A	0 / 7	4–7	36%
Monte Carlo Masters	A	A	A	A	A	Q2	A	A	A	A	A	A	2R	QF	1R	A	NH	A	A	A	A	0 / 3	4–3	57%
Madrid Open (Note: Held as Hamburg Masters (clay) until 2008, Madrid Masters (clay) 2009–present.)	A	A	A	A	Q1	A	1R	A	A	A	A	1R	3R	SF	3R	A	NH	Q1	A	A	A	0 / 5	8–5	62%
Rome Masters	A	A	A	A	1R	A	1R	1R	A	A	A	2R	1R	2R	1R	A	A	Q1	A	A	A	0 / 7	2–7	22%
Canadian Open	A	A	A	A	A	A	A	A	A	A	A	1R	A	A	A	A	NH	A	A	A	A	0 / 1	0–1	0%
Cincinnati Masters	A	A	A	A	A	A	A	A	A	A	A	1R	2R	A	A	A	Q1	A	A	A	A	0 / 2	1–2	33%
Shanghai Masters	NH					A	A	A	A	A	1R	1R	1R	1R	A	1R	NH			A	A	0 / 5	0–5	0%
Paris Masters	A	A	A	A	A	1R	A	A	A	A	2R	1R	3R	3R	A	1R	Q1	A	A	A	A	0 / 5	4–5	44%
Win–loss	0–0	0–0	0–0	0–0	1–2	0–1	1–4	3–3	0–0	0–0	1–2	2–8	6–8	13–7	4–4	0–3	0–0	0–0	0–1			0 / 43	31–43	42%
National representation
Summer Olympics	A	NH			A	NH			A	NH			2R	NH				A	NH			0 / 1	1–1	50%
Career statistics
	2004	2005	2006	2007	2008	2009	2010	2011	2012	2013	2014	2015	2016	2017	2018	2019	2020	2021	2022	2023	2024	Career		
Tournaments	0	0	0	1	13	15	22	13	0	4	14	26	25	22	14	23	10	11	6			Career total: 219		
Titles	0	0	0	0	0	0	0	0	0	0	2	1	2	1	0	0	0	0	0			Career total: 6		
Finals	0	0	0	0	0	0	0	0	0	0	2	2	4	1	0	1	0	0	0			Career total: 10		
Overall win–loss	3–1	4–1	1–1	4–1	10–15	19–15	21–22	13–13	0–0	2–4	18–12	29–26	34–23	20–21	19–14	24–23	8–14	9–11	4–7			6 / 219	242–224	52%
Year-end ranking	834	354	230	113	142	50	63	142	–	220	30	40	22	32	88	45	67	98	245	826	-			

=== Doubles ===
Tournament	2004	2005	2006	2007	2008	2009	2010	2011	2012	2013	2014	2015	2016	2017	2018	2019	2020	2021	2022	SR	W–L	Win%
Grand Slam tournaments
Australian Open	A	A	A	A	A	A	A	1R	A	A	A	QF	SF	2R	1R	2R	2R	1R	A	0 / 8	10–8	56%
French Open	A	A	A	3R	W	3R	A	1R	A	SF	2R	2R	QF	3R	2R	2R	3R	2R	A	1 / 13	26–12	68%
Wimbledon	A	A	A	A	A	1R	A	A	A	A	3R	1R	3R	A	2R	1R	NH	A	A	0 / 6	5–6	45%
US Open	A	A	A	2R	2R	3R	2R	A	A	3R	1R	1R	1R	2R	A	1R	A	1R	A	0 / 11	8–11	42%
Win–loss	0–0	0–0	0–0	3–2	7–1	4–3	1–1	0–2	0–0	6–2	3–3	4–4	9–4	4–3	2–3	2–4	3–2	1–3	0–0	1 / 38	49–38	56%
ATP Masters 1000
Indian Wells Masters	A	A	A	A	A	A	2R	A	A	A	A	1R	1R	1R	SF	A	NH	A	A	0 / 5	4–4	50%
Miami Open	A	A	A	A	A	A	A	1R	A	A	A	1R	2R	1R	A	A	NH	A	A	0 / 4	1–4	20%
Monte Carlo Masters	A	A	A	A	A	1R	A	A	A	A	A	A	1R	W	QF	A	NH	A	A	1 / 4	7–3	70%
Madrid Open	A	A	A	A	A	A	A	A	A	A	A	2R	2R	1R	2R	A	NH	A	A	0 / 4	3–4	43%
Rome Masters	A	A	A	A	A	A	SF	A	A	A	A	W	QF	QF	SF	1R	A	A	A	1 / 6	15–5	75%
Canadian Open	A	A	A	A	A	A	A	A	A	A	A	1R	A	A	A	A	NH	A	A	0 / 1	0–1	0%
Cincinnati Masters	A	A	A	A	A	A	A	A	A	A	A	1R	2R	A	A	A	A	A	A	0 / 2	1–2	33%
Shanghai Masters	NH					A	A	A	A	A	2R	1R	QF	1R	A	1R	NH		A	0 / 5	3–5	38%
Paris Masters	A	A	A	A	A	1R	A	A	A	A	QF	2R	1R	1R	A	2R	A	A	A	0 / 6	2–6	25%
Win–loss	0–0	0–0	0–0	0–0	0–0	0–2	4–1	0–1	0–0	0–0	2–2	6–7	7–8	7–6	9–4	1–3	0–0	0–0	0–0	2 / 37	36–34	51%
Career statistics
	2004	2005	2006	2007	2008	2009	2010	2011	2012	2013	2014	2015	2016	2017	2018	2019	2020	2021	2022	Career		
Titles	0	0	0	0	1	2	1	0	0	0	0	1	0	4	0	0	0	0	0	Career total: 9		
Finals	0	0	0	0	2	2	2	0	0	1	2	2	1	5	0	0	0	0	0	Career total: 17		
Overall win–loss	0–1	1–1	1–1	7–5	20–13	21–14	20–15	8–10	0–0	10–4	17–15	18–19	23–20	29–14	18–9	11–18	7–6	3–8	3–4	9 /	217–177	55%
Year-end ranking	1109	342	163	60	21	40	62	209	–	63	54	34	34	21	44	124	114	170	408			

=== Mixed doubles ===
Tournament	2010	...	2015	2016	2017	SR	W–L
Australian Open	A		SF	A	1R	0 / 2	3–2
French Open	A		A	A	A	0 / 0	0–0
Wimbledon	A		A	A	A	0 / 0	0–0
US Open	QF		A	A	A	0 / 1	2–1
Win–loss	2–1		3–1	0–0	0–1	0 / 3	5–3

== Significant finals ==
=== Grand Slam tournaments ===
==== Doubles: 1 (title) ====
Result	Year	Tournament	Surface	Partner	Opponents	Score
Win	2008	French Open	Clay	(Peru) Luis Horna	(Canada) Daniel Nestor (Serbia) Nenad Zimonjić	6–2, 6–3

=== ATP 1000 tournaments ===
==== Doubles: 2 (2 titles) ====
Result	Year	Tournament	Surface	Partner	Opponents	Score
Win	2015	Italian Open	Clay	(Spain) David Marrero	(Spain) Marcel Granollers (Spain) Marc López	6–4, 7–5
Win	2017	Monte-Carlo Masters	Clay	(India) Rohan Bopanna	(Spain) Feliciano López (Spain) Marc López	6–3, 3–6, [10–4]

== ATP Tour finals ==
=== Singles: 10 (6 titles, 4 runner-ups) ===
Legend Grand Slam (0–0) ATP 1000 (0–0) ATP 500 (1–1) ATP 250 (5–3)	Finals by surface Hard (0–0) Clay (6–3) Grass (0–1)	Finals by setting Outdoor (5–4) Indoor (1–0)

Result	W–L	Date	Tournament	Tier	Surface	Opponent	Score
Win	1–0	Jul 2014	Swedish Open, Sweden	ATP 250	Clay	(Portugal) João Sousa	6–2, 6–1
Win	2–0	Jul 2014	Croatia Open, Croatia	ATP 250	Clay	(Spain) Tommy Robredo	6–3, 6–4
Win	3–0	Feb 2015	Brasil Open, Brazil	ATP 250	Clay (i)	(Italy) Luca Vanni	6–4, 3–6, 7–6^{(7–4)}
Loss	3–1	May 2015	Istanbul Open, Turkey	ATP 250	Clay	(Switzerland) Roger Federer	3–6, 6–7^{(11–13)}
Win	4–1	Feb 2016	Rio Open, Brazil	ATP 500	Clay	(Argentina) Guido Pella	6–4, 6–7^{(5–7)}, 6–4
Win	5–1	Feb 2016	Brasil Open, Brazil (2)	ATP 250	Clay	(Spain) Pablo Carreño Busta	7–6^{(7–4)}, 6–3
Loss	5–2	Jun 2016	Nottingham Open, UK	ATP 250	Grass	(United States) Steve Johnson	6–7^{(5–7)}, 5–7
Loss	5–3	Jul 2016	German Open, Germany	ATP 500	Clay	(Slovakia) Martin Kližan	1–6, 4–6
Win	6–3	Mar 2017	Brasil Open, Brazil (3)	ATP 250	Clay	(Spain) Albert Ramos Viñolas	6–7^{(3–7)}, 6–4, 6–4
Loss	6–4	May 2019	Estoril Open, Portugal	ATP 250	Clay	(Greece) Stefanos Tsitsipas	3–6, 6–7^{(4–7)}

=== Doubles: 17 (9 titles, 8 runners-up) ===
Legend Grand Slam (1–0) ATP 1000 (2–0) ATP 500 (2–2) ATP 250 (4–6)	Finals by surface Hard (2–1) Clay (7–6) Grass (0–1)	Finals by setting Outdoor (7–7) Indoor (2–1)

Result	W–L	Date	Tournament	Tier	Surface	Partner	Opponents	Score
Loss	0–1	Apr 2008	Clay Court Championships, U.S.	International	Clay	(Spain) Marcel Granollers	(Latvia) Ernests Gulbis (Germany) Rainer Schüttler	5–7, 6–7^{(3–7)}
Win	1–1	Jun 2008	French Open, France	Grand Slam	Clay	(Peru) Luis Horna	(Canada) Daniel Nestor (Serbia) Nenad Zimonjić	6–2, 6–3
Win	2–1	Feb 2009	Chile Open, Chile	ATP 250	Clay	(Argentina) Brian Dabul	(Czech Republic) František Čermák (Slovakia) Michal Mertiňák	6–3, 6–3
Win	3–1	Oct 2009	Kremlin Cup, Russia	ATP 250	Hard (i)	(Spain) Marcel Granollers	(Czech Republic) František Čermák (Slovakia) Michal Mertiňák	4–6, 7–5, [10–8]
Win	4–1	Feb 2010	Brasil Open, Brazil	ATP 250	Clay	(Spain) Marcel Granollers	(Poland) Łukasz Kubot (Austria) Oliver Marach	7–5, 6–4
Loss	4–2	May 2010	Estoril Open, Portugal	ATP 250	Clay	(Spain) Marcel Granollers	(Spain) Marc López (Spain) David Marrero	7–6^{(7–1)}, 4–6, [4–10]
Loss	4–3	Sep 2013	Malaysian Open, Malaysia	ATP 250	Hard (i)	(Argentina) Horacio Zeballos	(United States) Eric Butorac (South Africa) Raven Klaasen	2–6, 4–6
Loss	4–4	Feb 2014	Argentina Open, Argentina	ATP 250	Clay	(Argentina) Horacio Zeballos	(Spain) Marcel Granollers (Spain) Marc López	5–7, 4–6
Loss	4–5	May 2014	Portugal Open, Portugal	ATP 250	Clay	(Spain) David Marrero	(Mexico) Santiago González (United States) Scott Lipsky	3–6, 6–3, [8–10]
Win	5–5	May 2015	Italian Open, Italy	ATP 1000	Clay	(Spain) David Marrero	(Spain) Marcel Granollers (Spain) Marc López	6–4, 7–5
Loss	5–6	Jun 2015	Nottingham Open, UK	ATP 250	Grass	(Spain) David Marrero	(Australia) Chris Guccione (Brazil) André Sá	2–6, 5–7
Loss	5–7	Apr 2016	Barcelona Open, Spain	ATP 500	Clay	(Spain) Marcel Granollers	(United States) Bob Bryan (United States) Mike Bryan	5–7, 5–7
Win	6–7	Feb 2017	Rio Open, Brazil	ATP 500	Clay	(Spain) Pablo Carreño Busta	(Colombia) Juan Sebastián Cabal (Colombia) Robert Farah	6–4, 5–7, [10–8]
Win	7–7	Apr 2017	Monte-Carlo Masters, Monaco	ATP 1000	Clay	(India) Rohan Bopanna	(Spain) Feliciano López (Spain) Marc López	6–3, 3–6, [10–4]
Loss	7–8	Jul 2017	German Open, Germany	ATP 500	Clay	(Spain) Marc López	(Croatia) Ivan Dodig (Croatia) Mate Pavić	3–6, 4–6
Win	8–8	Aug 2017	Kitzbühel Open, Austria	ATP 250	Clay	(Argentina) Guillermo Durán	(Chile) Hans Podlipnik Castillo (Belarus) Andrei Vasilevski	6–4, 4–6, [12–10]
Win	9–8	Oct 2017	Vienna Open, Austria	ATP 500	Hard (i)	(India) Rohan Bopanna	(Brazil) Marcelo Demoliner (United States) Sam Querrey	7–6^{(9–7)}, 6–7^{(4–7)}, [11–9]

== ATP Challenger and ITF Tour finals ==
=== Singles: 24 (18–6) ===
Legend ATP Challenger Tour (15–4) ITF Futures (3–2)	Finals by surface Hard (1–0) Clay (17–6)

Result	W–L	Date	Tournament	Tier	Surface	Opponent	Score
Loss	0–1	Jun 2005	Romania F6, Iași	Futures	Clay	(Argentina) Martín Alund	5–7, 4–6
Win	1–1	Sep 2005	Argentina F10, Rosario	Futures	Clay	(Argentina) Máximo González	6–7^{(5–7)}, 6–4, 2–6
Loss	1–2	Sep 2005	Uruguay F1, Montevideo	Futures	Clay	(Argentina) Juan-Martín Aranguren	2–6, 2–6
Win	2–2	Nov 2005	Venezuela F8, Maracay	Futures	Hard	(Venezuela) Yohny Romero	6–2, 3–0 ret.
Win	3–2	Jan 2006	Colombia F1, Manizales	Futures	Clay	(Argentina) Lionel Noviski	7–5, 6–3
Loss	3–3	Nov 2006	Naples, USA	Challenger	Clay	(Argentina) Carlos Berlocq	3–6, 5–7
Win	4–3	May 2007	Tunica Resorts, USA	Challenger	Clay (i)	(Argentina) Juan Pablo Brzezicki	6–4, 4–6, 6–3
Win	5–3	Jul 2007	Scheveningen, Netherlands	Challenger	Clay	(Germany) Dominik Meffert	6–3, 6–4
Win	6–3	Nov 2007	Lima, Peru	Challenger	Clay	(Brazil) Marcos Daniel	0–6, 6–4, 6–3
Win	7–3	Apr 2009	Napoli, Italy	Challenger	Clay	(Romania) Victor Crivoi	6–1, 6–3
Win	8–3	Oct 2009	Montevideo, Uruguay	Challenger	Clay	(Ecuador) Nicolás Lapentti	7–5, 6–1
Win	9–3	Sep 2010	Szczecin, Poland	Challenger	Clay	(Russia) Igor Andreev	6–1, 6–1
Loss	9–4	Oct 2010	Montevideo, Uruguay	Challenger	Clay	(Argentina) Máximo González	6–1, 3–6, 4–6
Loss	9–5	Oct 2010	Buenos Aires, Argentina	Challenger	Clay	(Argentina) Máximo González	4–6, 3–6
Win	10–5	Oct 2013	Buenos Aires, Argentina	Challenger	Clay	(Argentina) Facundo Argüello	7–6^{(8–6)}, 2–6, 6–4
Win	11–5	Mar 2014	Barranquilla, Colombia	Challenger	Clay	(Slovakia) Martin Kližan	6–3, 6–1
Loss	11–6	May 2014	Rome, Italy	Challenger	Clay	(Germany) Julian Reister	3–6, 2–6
Win	12–6	Jun 2014	Mestre, Italy	Challenger	Clay	(Italy) Marco Cecchinato	6–4, 4–6, 6–2
Win	13–6	Nov 2014	Guayaquil, Ecuador	Challenger	Clay	(Italy) Paolo Lorenzi	w/o
Win	14–6	Nov 2014	Montevideo, Uruguay	Challenger	Clay	(Bolivia) Hugo Dellien	6–2, 6–4
Win	15–6	Nov 2017	Montevideo, Uruguay	Challenger	Clay	(Portugal) Gastão Elias	6–4, 6–3
Win	16–6	Apr 2019	Tunis, Tunisia	Challenger	Clay	(Portugal) João Domingues	7–5, 6–4
Win	17–6	May 2019	Aix-en-Provence, France	Challenger	Clay	(France) Quentin Halys	7–5, 3–6, 6–2
Win	18–6	June 2021	Lyon, France	Challenger	Clay	(Sweden) Elias Ymer	6–2, 6-2

=== Doubles: 43 (22–21) ===
Legend ATP Challenger Tour (16–13) ITF Futures (6–8)	Finals by surface Hard (1–1) Clay (21–20)

Result	W–L	Date	Tournament	Tier	Surface	Partner	Opponents	Score
Loss	0–1	Nov 2004	Brazil F13, Santos	Futures	Clay	(Argentina) Agustin Tarantino	(Brazil) Thiago Alves (Brazil) Thomaz Bellucci	3–6, 6–3, 4–6
Loss	0–2	Apr 2005	Chile F2, Santiago	Futures	Clay	(Argentina) Horacio Zeballos	(Argentina) Brian Dabul (Argentina) Damián Patriarca	4–6, 2–6
Loss	0–3	Apr 2005	Chile F3, Santiago	Futures	Clay	(Argentina) Horacio Zeballos	(Chile) Jorge Aguilar (Chile) Felipe Parada	3–6, 4–6
Win	1–3	May 2005	Argentina F3, Córdoba	Futures	Clay	(Argentina) Horacio Zeballos	(Argentina) Matías Niemiz (Argentina) Cristian Villagrán	6–2, 6–2
Win	2–3	May 2005	Argentina F4, Córdoba	Futures	Clay	(Argentina) Horacio Zeballos	(Argentina) Diego Cristin (Uruguay) Martín Vilarrubí	7–5, 2–6, 7–6^{(7–5)}
Loss	2–4	May 2005	Argentina F5, Córdoba	Futures	Clay	(Argentina) Horacio Zeballos	(Argentina) Diego Cristin (Uruguay) Martín Vilarrubí	6–4, 6–7^{(5–7)}, 4–6
Win	3–4	Jun 2005	Romania F5, Bucharest	Futures	Clay	(Uruguay) Martín Vilarrubí	(Romania) Adrian Cruciat (Romania) Adrian-Vasile Gavrilă	7–6^{(7–5)}, 6–2
Win	4–4	Jun 2005	Romania F7, Bucharest	Futures	Clay	(Uruguay) Martín Vilarrubí	(Spain) Pablo Andújar (Venezuela) Igor Muguruza	5–7, 6–1, 6–4
Loss	4–5	Aug 2005	Romania F15, Craiova	Futures	Clay	(Germany) Eric Scherer	(Romania) Adrian Barbu (Romania) Ionuț Moldovan	6–7^{(3–7)}, 2–6
Loss	4–6	Sep 2005	Argentina F10, Rosario	Futures	Clay	(Argentina) Horacio Zeballos	(Argentina) Máximo González (Argentina) Damián Patriarca	6–7^{(5–7)}, 6–4, 2–6
Win	5–6	Sep 2005	Uruguay F1, Montevideo	Futures	Clay	(Uruguay) Martín Vilarrubí	(Argentina) Matias O'Neille (Argentina) Emiliano Redondi	7–6^{(7–4)}, 6–4
Loss	5–7	Nov 2005	Venezuela F7, Maracay	Futures	Hard	(Argentina) Horacio Zeballos	(Argentina) Brian Dabul (Uruguay) Marcel Felder	5–7, 4–6
Win	6–7	Jan 2006	Colombia F1, Manizales	Futures	Clay	(Argentina) Horacio Zeballos	(Argentina) Diego Álvarez (Argentina) Emiliano Redondi	6–4, 7–6^{(7–2)}
Loss	6–8	Feb 2006	Colombia F2, Bucaramanga	Futures	Clay	(Uruguay) Martín Vilarrubí	(Argentina) Brian Dabul (Uruguay) Marcel Felder	3–6, 2–6
Win	7–8	Jul 2006	Montauban, France	Challenger	Clay	(Chile) Adrián García	(France) Marc Gicquel (France) Édouard Roger-Vasselin	6–3, 4–6, [10–8]
Loss	7–9	Oct 2006	Quito, Ecuador	Challenger	Clay	(Argentina) Horacio Zeballos	(Brazil) Rogério Dutra Silva (Brazil) Marcelo Melo	3–6, 4–6
Loss	7–10	Oct 2006	Medellín, Colombia	Challenger	Clay	(Argentina) Horacio Zeballos	(Brazil) André Ghem (Brazil) Marcelo Melo	w/o
Win	8–10	Nov 2006	Naples, USA	Challenger	Clay	(Argentina) Horacio Zeballos	(United States) Goran Dragicevic (United States) Mirko Pehar	7–6^{(7–5)}, 6–3
Win	9–10	Jan 2007	São Paulo, Brazil	Challenger	Hard	(Chile) Adrián García	(Brazil) Marcelo Melo (Brazil) Alexandre Simoni	6–4, 6–2
Loss	9–11	Jan 2007	Santiago, Chile	Challenger	Clay	(Argentina) Horacio Zeballos	(Argentina) Brian Dabul (Spain) Marc López	2–6, 6–3, [8–10]
Win	10–11	Apr 2007	Florianópolis, Brazil	Challenger	Clay	(Argentina) Horacio Zeballos	(Brazil) André Miele (Brazil) João Souza	6–4, 6–4
Loss	10–12	May 2007	Naples, USA	Challenger	Clay	(Argentina) Horacio Zeballos	(Argentina) Juan Pablo Brzezicki (Argentina) Leonardo Mayer	1–6, 7–6^{(7–4)}, [8–10]
Loss	10–13	May 2007	Tunica Resorts, USA	Challenger	Clay (i)	(Argentina) Horacio Zeballos	(United States) Paul Goldstein (United States) Donald Young	6–4, 1–6, [4–10]
Loss	10–14	Jul 2007	Reggio Emilia, Italy	Challenger	Clay	(Argentina) Horacio Zeballos	(Brazil) Franco Ferreiro (Algeria) Lamine Ouahab	4–6, 6–1, [4–10]
Win	11–14	Jul 2007	Turin, Italy	Challenger	Clay	(Argentina) Horacio Zeballos	(Spain) Pablo Andújar (Brazil) Flávio Saretta	6–3, 6–1
Loss	11–15	Jul 2007	Scheveningen, Netherlands	Challenger	Clay	(India) Rohan Bopanna	(Netherlands) Raemon Sluiter (Netherlands) Peter Wessels	6–7^{(6–8)}, 5–7
Win	12–15	Aug 2007	San Marino, San Marino	Challenger	Clay	(Argentina) Juan Pablo Guzmán	(Poland) Tomasz Bednarek (United States) James Cerretani	6–1, 6–0
Win	13–15	Oct 2007	Medellín, Colombia	Challenger	Clay	(Argentina) Horacio Zeballos	(Mexico) Santiago González (Brazil) Bruno Soares	6–4, 6–4
Win	14–15	Nov 2007	Montevideo, Uruguay	Challenger	Clay	(Peru) Luis Horna	(Spain) Marcel Granollers (Spain) Santiago Ventura	w/o
Win	15–15	Nov 2007	Lima, Peru	Challenger	Clay	(Argentina) Eduardo Schwank	(Colombia) Michael Quintero (Uruguay) Martín Vilarrubí	6–4, 6–2
Loss	15–16	Jan 2009	Iquique, Chile	Challenger	Clay	(Argentina) Horacio Zeballos	(Sweden) Johan Brunström (Netherlands Antilles) Jean-Julien Rojer	3–6, 4–6
Loss	15–17	Mar 2009	Barletta, Italy	Challenger	Clay	(Peru) Luis Horna	(Spain) Rubén Ramírez Hidalgo (Spain) Santiago Ventura	6–7^{(1–7)}, 2–6
Win	16–17	Apr 2009	Napoli, Italy	Challenger	Clay	(Spain) David Marrero	(Germany) Frank Moser (Czech Republic) Lukáš Rosol	6–4, 6–3
Win	17–17	May 2009	Bordeaux, France	Challenger	Clay	(Argentina) Horacio Zeballos	(France) Xavier Pujo (France) Stéphane Robert	4–6, 6–4, [10–4]
Loss	17–18	Jun 2009	Prostějov, Czech Republic	Challenger	Clay	(Slovakia) Dominik Hrbatý	(Sweden) Johan Brunström (Netherlands Antilles) Jean-Julien Rojer	2–6, 3–6
Loss	17–19	Jun 2009	Lugano, Switzerland	Challenger	Clay	(Argentina) Sergio Roitman	(Sweden) Johan Brunström (Netherlands Antilles) Jean-Julien Rojer	w/o
Loss	17–20	Oct 2009	Montevideo, Uruguay	Challenger	Clay	(Uruguay) Martín Cuevas	(Argentina) Juan Pablo Brzezicki (Spain) David Marrero	4–6, 4–6
Win	18–20	Nov 2013	Montevideo, Uruguay	Challenger	Clay	(Uruguay) Martín Cuevas	(Brazil) Rogério Dutra Silva (Brazil) André Ghem	w/o
Win	19–20	Mar 2014	Barranquilla, Colombia	Challenger	Clay	(Spain) Pere Riba	(Czech Republic) František Čermák (Russia) Mikhail Elgin	6–4, 6–3
Win	20–20	Jun 2014	Mestre, Italy	Challenger	Clay	(Argentina) Horacio Zeballos	(Italy) Daniele Bracciali (Italy) Potito Starace	6–4, 6–1
Win	21–20	Nov 2014	Montevideo, Uruguay	Challenger	Clay	(Uruguay) Martín Cuevas	(Chile) Nicolás Jarry (Chile) Gonzalo Lama	6–2, 6–4
Loss	21–21	Jun 2018	Prostějov, Czech Republic	Challenger	Clay	(Uruguay) Martín Cuevas	(Ukraine) Denys Molchanov (Slovakia) Igor Zelenay	6–4, 3–6, [7–10]
Win	22–21	June 2021	Lyon, France	Challenger	Clay	(Uruguay) Martín Cuevas	(France) Tristan Lamasine (France) Albano Olivetti	6–3, 7–6^{(7–2)}

== Record against top 10 players ==
- Cuevas' match record against players who have been ranked No. 10 or higher, with those who have been ranked No. 1 in **boldface**.
- (Spain) Nicolás Almagro 4–1
- (Spain) Pablo Carreño Busta 4–3
- (Argentina) Diego Schwartzman 3–4
- (France) Jo-Wilfried Tsonga 2–0
- (Russia) Nikolay Davydenko 2–1
- (Ecuador) Nicolás Lapentti 2–1
- (United States) Jack Sock 2–1
- (Austria) Jürgen Melzer 2–2
- (Czech Republic) Radek Štěpánek 2–2
- (Bulgaria) Grigor Dimitrov 2–3
- (Spain) Fernando Verdasco 2–3
- (Italy) Fabio Fognini 2–5
- (Austria) Dominic Thiem 2–5
- (Cyprus) Marcos Baghdatis 1–0
- (United States) James Blake 1–0
- (Argentina) Guillermo Cañas 1–0
- (Croatia) Marin Čilić 1–0
- (Argentina) Guillermo Coria 1–0
- (Argentina) Gastón Gaudio 1–0
- (Belgium) David Goffin 1–0
- (Brazil) **Gustavo Kuerten** 1–0
- (Spain) Tommy Robredo 1–0
- (United States) **Andy Roddick** 1–0
- (Germany) Alexander Zverev 1–0
- (Czech Republic) Tomáš Berdych 1–1
- (Poland) Hubert Hurkacz 1–1
- (France) Lucas Pouille 1–1
- (Argentina) Mariano Puerta 1–1
- (Canada) Denis Shapovalov 1–1
- (Switzerland) Stan Wawrinka 1–1
- (Russia) Mikhail Youzhny 1–1
- (Spain) **Juan Carlos Ferrero** 1–2
- (Russia) Karen Khachanov 1–3
- (Canada) Milos Raonic 1–3
- (France) Gaël Monfils 1–4
- (France) Gilles Simon 1–4
- (Spain) **Rafael Nadal** 1–5
- (Italy) Matteo Berrettini 0–1
- (Serbia) **Novak Djokovic** 0–1
- (United States) Mardy Fish 0–1
- (France) Richard Gasquet 0–1
- (United States) John Isner 0–1
- (Japan) Kei Nishikori 0–1
- (Serbia) Janko Tipsarević 0–1
- (Spain) Roberto Bautista Agut 0–2
- (Canada) Félix Auger-Aliassime 0–2
- (Argentina) Juan Martín del Potro 0–2
- (Switzerland) **Roger Federer** 0–2
- (Norway) Casper Ruud 0–2
- (South Africa) Kevin Anderson 0–3
- (United Kingdom) **Andy Murray** 0–3
- (Spain) David Ferrer 0–4
- (Chile) Fernando González 0–4
- (Greece) Stefanos Tsitsipas 0–4
- (Argentina) Juan Mónaco 0–5

== Wins over top 10 players ==
- Cuevas has a 5–24 record against players who were ranked in the top 10 at the time the match was played.

Season	2011	...	2015	2016	2017	2018	Total
Wins	1		1	1	1	1	5

#	Player	Rank	Event	Surface	Rd	Score
2011
1.	(United States) Andy Roddick	8	Miami, United States	Hard	2R	6–4, 7–6^{(7–4)}
2015
2.	(Czech Republic) Tomáš Berdych	5	Beijing, China	Hard	1R	6–4, 6–4
2016
3.	(Spain) Rafael Nadal	5	Rio de Janeiro, Brazil	Clay	SF	6–7^{(6–8)}, 7–6^{(7–3)}, 6–4
2017
4.	(Switzerland) Stan Wawrinka	3	Monte Carlo, Monaco	Clay	3R	6–4, 6–4
2018
5.	(Austria) Dominic Thiem	6	Indian Wells, United States	Hard	3R	3–6, 6–4, 4–2 ret.
