= Gianluigi Quinzi =

Italian former tennis player

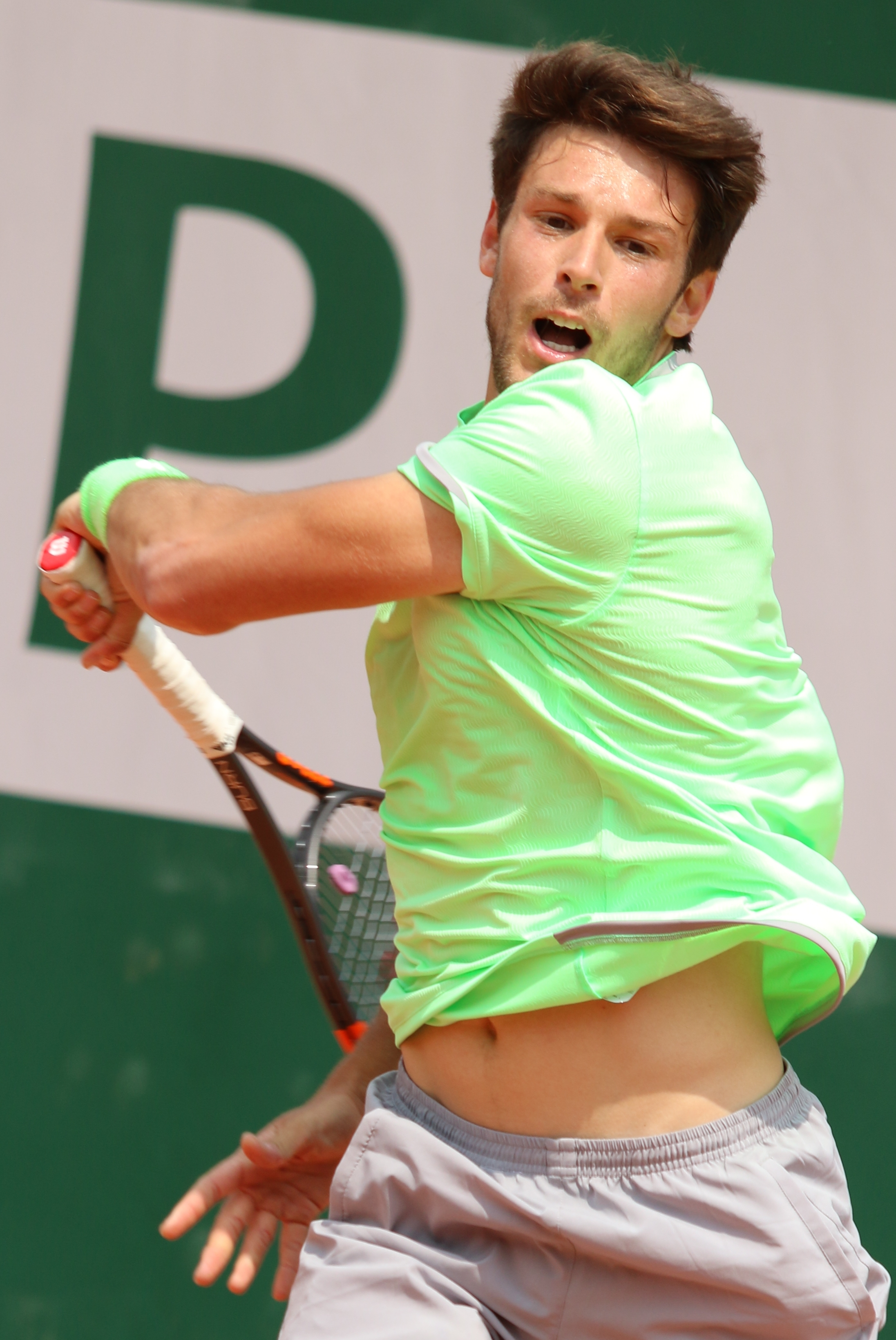
- Quinzi in 2019
- Country (sports): Italy
- Born: 1 February 1996 (age 30) Cittadella, Italy
- Height: 1.91 m (6 ft 3 in)
- Turned pro: 2010
- Retired: 2021 (last match in 2020)
- Plays: Left handed (two–handed backhand)
- Coach: Eduardo Medica (2010–2014; 2015–2016); Tomas Tenconi (2014); Marcos Górriz (2014); Federico Torresi (2014); Mariano Monachesi (2014–2015); Giancarlo Petrazzuolo (2015); Ronnie Leitgeb (2016–2017); Fabio Goretti (2017–2021)
- Prize money: $280,371

Singles
- Career record: 1–4 (ATP Tour level, Grand Slam level, and Davis Cup)
- Career titles: 0
- Highest ranking: No. 142 (15 April 2019)

Grand Slam singles results
- Australian Open: Q1 (2019)
- French Open: Q2 (2019)
- Wimbledon: Q1 (2017)
- US Open: Q1 (2018)

Doubles
- Career record: 0–0 (ATP Tour level, Grand Slam level, and Davis Cup)
- Career titles: 0
- Highest ranking: No. 441 (26 September 2016)

Gianluigi Quinzi (Italian pronunciation: [dʒanluˈiːdʒi ˈkwintsi]; born 1 February 1996), is an Italian tennis coach and former tennis player. He reached his career-high singles ranking of world No. 142 rankings in 2019. He reached his career high ranking of No. 1 in ITF Juniors rankings on 1 January 2013, for a week.

Quinzi won the 2013 Wimbledon Championships Junior Boys' singles title, defeating in the final Chung Hyeon.

== Personal life ==
Gianluigi was born in Cittadella on 1 February 1996 and grew up in Porto San Giorgio with his mother Carlotta, a ski racer and handball player, and his father Luca, the president of a local tennis club.

== Junior career ==
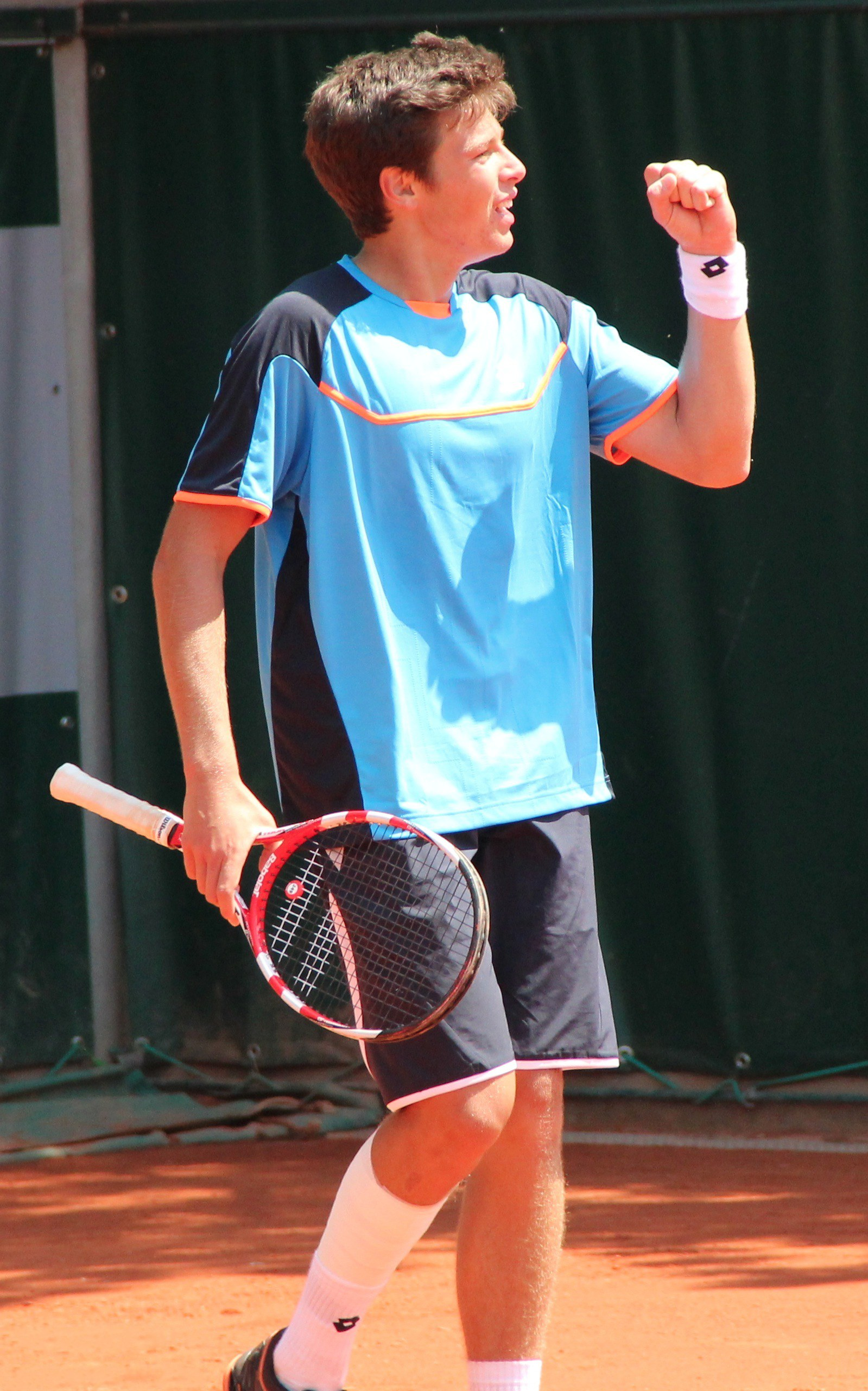
Gianluigi Quinzi at 2013 French Open Junior

Initially Quinzi applied himself to Alpine skiing, gaining a second place in the championships of the Trentino-Alto Adige; but at seven years old, after leaving other sports as well, he focused his efforts primarily on tennis.
At the age of 8 he was admitted to the academy of the talent scout Nick Bollettieri and he moved to Florida with his mother and little brother. In the same year he won at the Little Mo, tournament played in Florida which is reserved for Under-10 players. At thirteen years old, he became the youngest player in the ITF Junior rankings and the next year he triumphed in four tournaments in a row with a series of twenty victories.

gedfourteen – in 2010 – he won the Honduras Junior Bowl, on clay court, by defeating in the final Walner Espinoza, becoming the youngest Italian player to win an ITF Junior tournament. With the results obtained in 2010, Quinzi was nominated Player of the Year, in the category Under-14, by the European Tennis Association.

Quinzi obtained his best result in Italy: in Milan he won the Trofeo Bonfiglio in 2012, beating Temür Ismailov in three sets. At the 2012 French Open Junior he was seeded No. 2. He was eliminated in the third round by British tennis player Kyle Edmund. At the 2012 Wimbledon Junior the young Italian, No. 3 seed, arrived in the semifinals where he lost to Luke Saville, who was No. 1 in the Junior ITF rankings and the returning champion from 2011. In September, he reached the 2012 US Open Junior quarterfinals, losing in three sets to the Japanese player Yoshihito Nishioka.

In September 2012, Quinzi won the 2012 Junior Davis Cup with Filippo Baldi: is the first time that Italy won the Junior Davis Cup, after the 2011 Italy finished runner-up with Quinzi also playing.

On 1 January 2013, Quinzi reached his best ranking of No. 1 in the world in the ITF Junior rankings, and he is the first Italian player ever to obtain this result, but it drops to second place after just one week. At 2013 Australian Open Quinzi, seeded No. 2, reached the quarterfinals, but there he was defeated by Thanasi Kokkinakis in three sets. In March, Quinzi reached the final of Banana Bowl tournament; he lost in three sets to the French player Jean Sebastien Tatlot. The following week he won Copa Gerdau beating Stefan Kozlov in the final.

At the second Junior Grand Slam of the season, the 2013 French Open, Quinzi arrived into the quarterfinals, where he lost to No. 2 Nikola Milojević. One month later, Quinzi, seeded sixth, soon reached the semifinals at 2013 Wimbledon, beating Kyle Edmund in straight sets to reach his first Junior Grand Slam final. In the final, he defeated the Korean, Chung Hyeon. He won the title without dropping a set in the entire tournament. Quinzi was the second Italian in sport history to win here; Diego Nargiso was the first to win the title in 1987.

At 2013 US Open Quinzi reached the quarterfinals but lost to Thanasi Kokkinakis in three sets.

== Professional career ==
=== 2011–2012: Professional debut ===
In September 2011, Quinzi obtained his first ATP point at the 2011 Mazatlán Open beating the Swiss tennis player Luca Margaroli in the first round. His first best result in ITF Men's Circuit went in 2012 Pozzuoli, where he reached the quarterfinals, but he lost to the Italian player Alessio di Mauro. In September 2012, he reached his first semifinal match in the ITF tournament of Manzanillo, in Mexico. In the following two months he also reached the semifinals in other 4 ITF tournaments (Santa Cruz, Santiago, Santa Maria and Lins).

On November 23, 2012, he reached is first ITF final in the tournament of Curico, Chile ($10,000, on clay court), defeating Juan Carlos Sáez in the semifinal, but he lost to Guillermo Rivera Aránguiz in straight sets. Quinzi, at the end of 2012, was world rank No. 561.

=== 2013 ===
In 2013 in the first ITF Futures tournament he took part, in Bogotá, he reached his second career final. He lost to Carlos Salamanca in straight sets.

In April Quinzi officially entered in the Top 500, at the time the youngest player of the ATP rankings among the first 500. He then received a wild card to enter the main draw of the 2013 Rai Open, but he lost in the first round to Frederico Gil in three sets. The following week he took part to his second ITF tournament of the season, in Sharm El Sheik; he reached his third career ITF final. He lost to Mohamed Safwat in three sets. Two weeks later, again in Egypt, Quinzi reached the semifinals of the F6 Futures tournament on clay court, but he lost to Kevin Krawietz.

At the end of May Quinzi played his fourth ITF tournament of the season, in Casablanca ($10.000, clay). After beating the n.1 seed Sergio Gutiérrez Ferrol in the quarterfinals, and after receiving a walkover in the semifinals, Quinzi reached his fourth career final in an ITF tournament. Here he won his first career title beating in three sets Lamine Ouahab and entered, for the first time, the Top 400 of the ATP World rankings.

In July, Quinzi received a wildcard to join the main draw of the 2013 Guzzini Challenger: here he reached his first win in a Challenger tournament, beating fellow Italian Stefano Travaglia in three sets, but lost in the second round to Flavio Cipolla. In August Quinzi took part to two other Challenger tournaments in Italy but lost in the first round to Filippo Volandri and Paolo Lorenzi. In September Quinzi continued playing in ATP Challenger Tour, taking part to some tournaments in South America: at 2013 Quito Challenger Quinzi lost in the second round to eventual semifinalist Giovanni Lapentti; in Porto Alegre, one week later, he entered the main draw as a qualifier and stunned Gastão Elias in the first round. Quinzi then reached for the first time the quarterfinals round on an ATP Challenger Tour tournament, defeating Leonardo Kirche, but lost in three sets to Pedro Sousa.

In November, in Colombia, Quinzi reach for the first time the semifinals in a Challenger tournament; he failed to reach the final losing in three sets to Leonardo Mayer. He finished the season losing to Pavel Krainik in the semifinals of a Future tournament in Mérida, Mexico. At the end of 2013, Quinzi was world rank No. 328.

=== 2014 ===
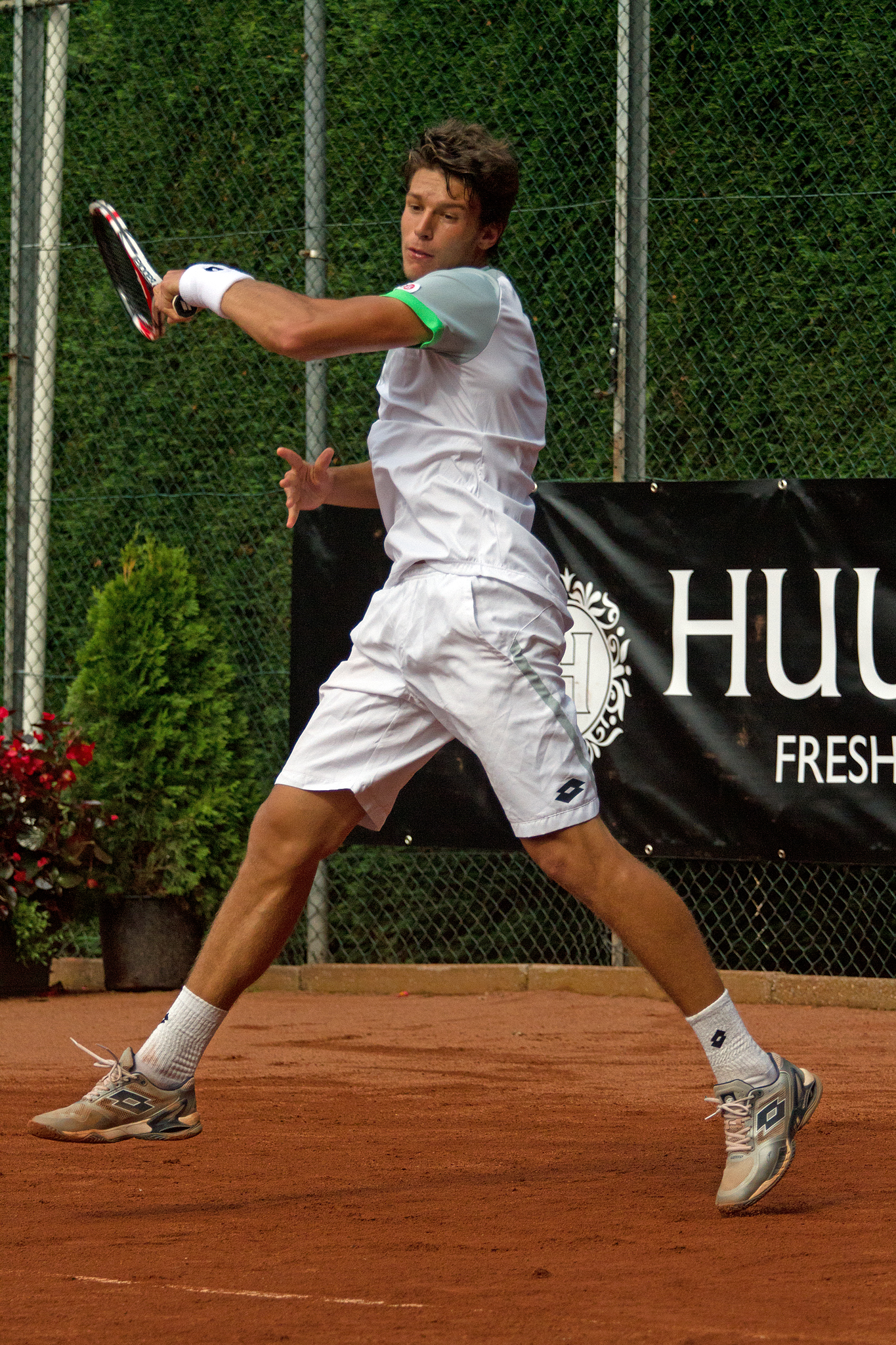
Quinzi in Oldenzaal (2015)

Quinzi started the season in Zagreb where he obtained his first ATP World Tour victory beating Yannick Mertens in straight sets in the qualifying draw of the 2014 PBZ Zagreb Indoors. Anyway, he lost to Peđa Krstin in the following round. Then Quinzi played in Bergamo having received a wildcard into the singles main draw of the 2014 Trofeo Faip–Perrel where he fell in the first round.

In the following months Quinzi took part to other tournaments around the world, without obtaining any significant result: he lost in the first round of the 2014 All Japan Indoor Tennis Championships; then he was defeated by Argentine player Facundo Argüello in the second round of the 2014 Challenger ATP Cachantún Cup and in the first round of the 2014 Rome Open by Taro Daniel.

In May, after the divorce from his coach Eduardo Medica, Quinzi obtained his best results in 2014, capturing three $10,000 ITF tournaments in three weeks – and winning 15 matches in a row: in Galați, Romania, and then in Casablanca.

Later in the year, in August, a wrist injury stopped Quinzi's for four months. After some disappointing results, in November Quinzi reached the quarterfinals of the 2014 Uruguay Open losing in straight sets to Pedro Cachin; he finished the season in Argentina, where he took part at two ITF events in Mendoza (losing to eventual champion Grzegorz Panfil in the semifinals, and falling in the first round the following week). At the end of 2014 Quinzi was world rank No. 424.

=== 2015 ===
At the end of January Quinzi took part at his first 2015 tournament in Palm Coast: playing on clay, the Italian reached the quarterfinals of the $10.000 ITF event. A couple of weeks later, Quinzi won his fifth Future tournament of his career, beating Federico Coria on the green clay of Sunrise (Florida). At the 2015 Argentina Open in Buenos Aires he lost to Thiago Monteiro in straight sets in the second round of the qualifying draw; in March the Italian qualified for the main draw of the 2015 Challenger ATP Cachantún Cup but lost in the first round to Juan Ignacio Londero. Quinzi then obtained a wildcard into the qualifying draw of the Miami Masters, but he was defeated by Thiemo de Bakker.

In April he reached the quarterfinals of the 2015 Tennis Napoli Cup as a wildcard beating the No. 3 seed and world No. 104 Blaž Rola 6–3, 6–1 and fellow Italian Flavio Cipolla in the first two rounds; he lost to Marco Cecchinato.

=== 2017 ===
After being awarded a wildcard thanks to a qualifying tournament, Quinzi took part in the first edition of the 2017 Next Generation ATP Finals, held in Milan, Italy. He lost all his matches in round robin, versus Andrej Rublev, Denis Shapovalov and Hyeon Chung.

=== 2019 ===
In the quarterfinals of the Bergamo challenger, he lost in straigh sets against Italian seventeen-year-old wild card Jannik Sinner (future multiple Grand Slam champion and ATP #1), who won the tournament.

=== 2021: Retirement ===
Quinzi retired at 25 years old in July 2021 due failed to satisfy high expectations and competitive stress.

== Performance timeline ==
Key
W	F	SF	QF	#R	RR	Q#	DNQ	A	NH

(W) winner; (F) finalist; (SF) semifinalist; (QF) quarterfinalist; (#R) rounds 4, 3, 2, 1; (RR) round-robin stage; (Q#) qualification round; (DNQ) did not qualify; (A) absent; (NH) not held; (SR) strike rate (events won / competed); (W–L) win–loss record.

=== Singles ===
Tournament	2015	2016	2017	2018	2019	2020	2021	SR	W–L	Win %
Grand Slam tournaments
Australian Open	A	A	A	A	Q1	A	A	0 / 0	0–0	–
French Open	A	A	A	A	Q2	A	A	0 / 0	0–0	–
Wimbledon	A	A	Q1	A	A	NH	A	0 / 0	0–0	–
US Open	A	A	A	Q1	A	A	A	0 / 0	0–0	–
Win–loss	0–0	0–0	0–0	0–0	0–0	0–0	0–0	0 / 0	0–0	–
ATP Tour Masters 1000
Miami Open	Q1	A	A	A	Q1	A	A	0 / 0	0–0	–
Indian Wells Masters	A	A	A	A	Q1	NH	A	0 / 0	0–0	–
Italian Open	Q1	A	A	A	A	A	A	0 / 0	0–0	–
Win–loss	0–0	0–0	0–0	0–0	0–0	0–0	0–0	0 / 0	0–0	–

== ATP Challenger and ITF Futures finals ==
=== Singles: 20 (14–6) ===
Legend ATP Challenger (2–1) ITF Futures (12–5)	Finals by surface Hard (3–1) Clay (11–5) Grass (0–0) Carpet (0–0)

Result	W–L	Date	Tournament	Tier	Surface	Opponent	Score
Loss	0–1	Nov 2012	Chile F12, Curicó	Futures	Clay	(Chile) Guillermo Rivera Aránguiz	4–6, 4–6
Loss	0–2	Mar 2013	Colombia F2, Bogotá	Futures	Clay	(Colombia) Carlos Salamanca	6–7^{(3–7)}, 6–7^{(2–7)}
Loss	0–3	Apr 2013	Egypt F4, Sharm El Sheikh	Futures	Clay	(Egypt) Mohamed Safwat	2–6, 6–1, 3–6
Win	1–3	Jun 2013	Morocco F1, Casablanca	Futures	Clay	(Algeria) Lamine Ouahab	7–6^{(7–2)}, 1–6, 6-4
Win	2–3	May 2014	Romania F1, Galați	Futures	Clay	(Romania) Vasile Antonescu	6–3, 2–6, 6–3
Win	3–3	May 2014	Morocco F1, Safi	Futures	Clay	(Bolivia) Hugo Dellien	6–2, 6–2
Win	4–3	Jun 2014	Morocco F2, Casablanca	Futures	Clay	(France) Gianni Mina	6–2, 6–3
Win	5–3	Feb 2015	USA F7, Sunrise	Futures	Clay	(Argentina) Federico Coria	6–4, 6–4
Win	6–3	Aug 2015	Netherlands F5, Oldenzaal	Futures	Clay	(Netherlands) Jesse Huta Galung	7–5, 2–0 ret.
Win	7–3	Apr 2016	Hungary F1, Szeged	Futures	Clay	(Poland) Grzegorz Panfil	6–3, 7–5
Win	8–3	May 2016	Bosnia & Herzegovina F3, Kiseljak	Futures	Clay	(Serbia) Dejan Katić	6–2, 6–4
Loss	8–4	Oct 2016	Norway F2, Oslo	Futures	Hard	(Austria) Lucas Miedler	2–6, 4–6
Win	9–4	Nov 2016	Norway F3, Oslo	Futures	Hard	(Norway) Casper Ruud	6–4, 6–2
Win	10–4	Jan 2018	Turkey F1, Antalya	Futures	Hard	(Germany) Marc Sieber	3–6, 6–3, 6–3
Win	11–4	Feb 2018	Egypt F4, Sharm El Sheikh	Futures	Hard	(Czech Republic) Jaroslav Pospíšil	6–2, 6–4
Win	12–4	Apr 2018	Francavilla, Italy	Challenger	Clay	(Norway) Casper Ruud	6–4, 6–1
Win	13–4	May 2018	Mestre, Italy	Challenger	Clay	(Italy) Gian Marco Moroni	6–2, 6–2
Loss	13–5	Jul 2018	Perugia, Italy	Challenger	Clay	(United States) Ulises Blanch	5–7, 2–6
Win	14–5	Feb 2020	M25 Weston, United States	World Tennis Tour	Clay	(Sweden) Christian Lindell	3–6, 7–5, 7–5
Loss	14–6	Sep 2020	M25 Jablonec, Czech Republic	World Tennis Tour	Clay	(Argentina) Agustín Velotti	2–6, 1–6

=== Doubles: 4 (2–2) ===
Legend ATP Challenger (0–1) ITF Futures (2–1)	Finals by surface Hard (1–2) Clay (1–0) Grass (0–0) Carpet (0–0)

Result	W–L	Date	Tournament	Tier	Surface	Partner	Opponents	Score
Loss	0–1	Jul 2013	Recanti, Italy	Challenger	Hard	(Italy) Adelchi Virgili	(United Kingdom) Ken Skupski (United Kingdom) Neal Skupski	4–6, 2–6
Win	1–1	Mar 2016	Israel F6, Ramat HaSharon	Futures	Hard	(Austria) Lucas Miedler	(Georgia (country)) Aleksandre Metreveli (Ukraine) Volodymyr Uzhylovskyi	6–1, 4–6, [10–5]
Win	2–1	Apr 2016	Hungary F1, Szeged	Futures	Clay	(Austria) Lucas Miedler	(Slovenia) Aljaž Radinski (Slovenia) Tomislav Ternar	7–6^{(7–5)}, 6–2
Loss	2–2	Nov 2016	Norway F3, Oslo	Futures	Hard	(Austria) Lucas Miedler	(Canada) Martin Beran (Slovakia) Filip Horanský	3–6, 6–2, [4–10]

== Junior Grand Slam finals ==
=== Singles: 1 (1 title) ===
Result	Year	Tournament	Surface	Opponent	Score
Win	2013	Wimbledon	Grass	(South Korea) Chung Hyeon	7–5, 7–6^{(7–2)}
