= Venice Challenge Save Cup =

- XVI Venice Challenge Save Cup

ATP Challenger Tour
- Location: Mestre, Italy
- Venue: Tennis Club Mestre
- Category: ATP Challenger Tour
- Surface: Clay
- Draw: 32S/32Q/16D
- Prize money: €42,500
- Website: Website

The Venice Challenge Save Cup was a tennis tournament held in Mestre, Italy from 2014 until 2018. The event was part of the ATP Challenger Tour and was played on outdoor clay courts.

== Past finals ==
=== Singles ===
Year	Champion	Runner-up	Score
2018	(Italy) Gianluigi Quinzi	(Italy) Gian Marco Moroni	6–2, 6–2
2017	(Portugal) João Domingues	(Austria) Sebastian Ofner	7–6^{(7–4)}, 6–4
2016	(Portugal) Gastão Elias	(Argentina) Horacio Zeballos	7–6^{(7–0)}, 6–2
2015	(Argentina) Máximo González	(Slovakia) Jozef Kovalík	6–1, 6–3
2014	(Uruguay) Pablo Cuevas	(Italy) Marco Cecchinato	6–4, 4–6, 6–2

=== Doubles ===
Year	Champion	Runner-up	Score
2018	(Croatia) Marin Draganja (Croatia) Tomislav Draganja	(Monaco) Romain Arneodo (Serbia) Danilo Petrović	6–4, 6–7^{(2–7)}, [10–2]
2017	(United Kingdom) Ken Skupski (United Kingdom) Neal Skupski	(Austria) Julian Knowle (Slovakia) Igor Zelenay	5–7, 6–4, [10–5]
2016	(Brazil) Fabrício Neis (Brazil) Caio Zampieri	(Germany) Kevin Krawietz (Croatia) Dino Marcan	7–6^{(7–3)}, 4–6, [12–10]
2015	(Italy) Flavio Cipolla (Italy) Potito Starace	(Argentina) Facundo Bagnis (Peru) Sergio Galdós	5–7, 7–6^{(7–3)}, [10–4]
2014	(Uruguay) Pablo Cuevas (Argentina) Horacio Zeballos	(Italy) Daniele Bracciali (Italy) Potito Starace	6–4, 6–1
