= 2024 Mubadala Citi DC Open =

Sports tournament

- Date: 29 July – 4 August
- Edition: 55th (men); 12th (women)
- Category: ATP 500 (men); WTA 500 (women)
- Draw: 48S/16D (men); 28S/16D (women)
- Prize money: $2,100,230 (men) $922,573 (women)
- Surface: Hard (outdoor); Har-Tru coating
- Location: Washington, D.C., United States
- Venue: William H.G. FitzGerald Tennis Center

Champions

Men's singles
- (United States) Sebastian Korda

Women's singles
- (Spain) Paula Badosa

Men's doubles
- (United States) Nathaniel Lammons / (United States) Jackson Withrow

Women's doubles
- (United States) Asia Muhammad / (United States) Taylor Townsend
- Washington Open

The 2024 Washington Open (called the Mubadala Citi DC Open for sponsorship reasons) was a tennis tournament played on outdoor hard courts. It was the 55th edition of the Washington Open for the men, and the 12th edition for the women. The event was part of the ATP Tour 500 series of the 2024 ATP Tour and a WTA 500 tournament on the 2024 WTA Tour. The Washington Open took place at the William H.G. FitzGerald Tennis Center in Washington, D.C., United States, from 29 July to 4 August 2024 and was played on a hard court manufactured by Har-Tru Sports Coatings.

== Finals ==
=== Men's singles ===
- (United States) Sebastian Korda defeated (Italy) Flavio Cobolli, 4–6, 6–2, 6–0

=== Women's singles ===
- (Spain) Paula Badosa defeated (Czech Republic) Marie Bouzková, 6–1, 4–6, 6–4

=== Men's doubles ===
- (United States) Nathaniel Lammons / (United States) Jackson Withrow defeated (Brazil) Rafael Matos / (Brazil) Marcelo Melo, 7–5, 6–3

=== Women's doubles ===
- (United States) Asia Muhammad / (United States) Taylor Townsend defeated (China) Jiang Xinyu / (Chinese Taipei) Wu Fang-hsien 7–6^{(7–0)}, 6–3

== Point distribution ==
Event	W	F	SF	QF	Round of 16	Round of 32	Round of 64	Q	Q2	Q1
Men's singles	500	330	200	100	50	25	0	16	8	0
Men's doubles	500	330	200	100	0	—N/a	—N/a	16	—N/a	0
Women's singles	500	325	195	108	60	1	—N/a	25	13	1
Women's doubles	500	325	195	108	1	—N/a	—N/a	—N/a	—N/a	—N/a

== ATP singles main draw entrants ==
=== Seeds ===
Country	Player	Rank^{†}	Seed
	Andrey Rublev	9	1
USA	Ben Shelton	14	2
	Karen Khachanov	22	3
USA	Sebastian Korda	23	4
USA	Frances Tiafoe	29	5
FRA	Adrian Mannarino	32	6
AUS	Jordan Thompson	41	7
ESP	Alejandro Davidovich Fokina	43	8
FRA	Giovanni Mpetshi Perricard	47	9
ITA	Flavio Cobolli	48	10
ESP	Roberto Carballés Baena	51	11
SRB	Miomir Kecmanović	52	12
USA	Brandon Nakashima	55	13
AUS	Aleksandar Vukic	60	14
USA	Alex Michelsen	61	15
FRA	Arthur Rinderknech	64	16

^{†} Rankings are as of 22 July 2024.

=== Other entrants ===
The following players received wildcards into the singles main draw:

- (Spain) Alejandro Davidovich Fokina
- (United States) Reilly Opelka
- Andrey Rublev
- (Canada) Denis Shapovalov
- (United States) J. J. Wolf

The following players received entry from the qualifying draw:

- (Moldova) Radu Albot
- (Italy) Mattia Bellucci
- (United States) Maxime Cressy
- (South Korea) Hong Seong-chan
- (United States) Mitchell Krueger
- (Sweden) Elias Ymer

The following player received entry as a lucky loser:

- (United States) Zachary Svajda

=== Withdrawals ===
- (Argentina) Federico Coria → replaced by (United States) Zachary Svajda
- (Japan) Taro Daniel → replaced by (Australia) Adam Walton
- (Bulgaria) Grigor Dimitrov → replaced by (Chile) Cristian Garín
- (France) Constant Lestienne → replaced by (France) Harold Mayot
- (Germany) Maximilian Marterer → replaced by (France) Luca Van Assche
- (Spain) Pedro Martínez → replaced by (Colombia) Daniel Elahi Galán

== ATP doubles main draw entrants ==
=== Seeds ===
Country	Player	Country	Player	Rank^{†}	Seed
FIN	Harri Heliövaara	GBR	Henry Patten	33	1
AUS	Max Purcell	AUS	Jordan Thompson	47	2
GBR	Jamie Murray	NZL	Michael Venus	51	3
USA	Nathaniel Lammons	USA	Jackson Withrow	56	4
GBR	Lloyd Glasspool	MEX	Santiago González	59	5
FRA	Sadio Doumbia	MON	Hugo Nys	69	6
GBR	Julian Cash	USA	Robert Galloway	77	7
BRA	Rafael Matos	BRA	Marcelo Melo	78	8

^{†} Rankings are as of 22 July 2024.

=== Other entrants ===
The following pairs received wildcard entry into the doubles main draw:

- ~~(Australia) Thanasi Kokkinakis / (United States) Frances Tiafoe~~
- (United States) Sebastian Korda / (United States) Alex Michelsen

The following pair received entry from the qualifying draw:

- (Ecuador) Diego Hidalgo / (Australia) John-Patrick Smith

The following pair received entry as lucky losers:

- (United States) Evan King / (United States) Vasil Kirkov

=== Withdrawals ===
- (Austria) Alexander Erler / (Austria) Lucas Miedler → replaced by (Austria) Alexander Erler / (France) Arthur Rinderknech
- (Australia) Thanasi Kokkinakis / (United States) Frances Tiafoe → replaced by (United States) Evan King / (United States) Vasil Kirkov

== WTA singles main draw entrants ==
=== Seeds ===
Country	Player	Rank^{†}	Seed
	Aryna Sabalenka	3	1
	Daria Kasatkina	12	2
	Liudmila Samsonova	13	3
TUN	Ons Jabeur	16	4
	~~Anna Kalinskaya~~	~~17~~	~~5~~
	Victoria Azarenka	20	6
	Anastasia Pavlyuchenkova	33	7
BEL	Elise Mertens	35	8
	Anastasia Potapova	41	9

^{†} Rankings are as of 22 July 2024.

=== Other entrants ===
The following players received wildcard entry into the main draw:

- (Spain) Paula Badosa
- (United States) Robin Montgomery
- (United States) Clervie Ngounoue
- (United Kingdom) Emma Raducanu

The following player received entry using a protected ranking:

- (United States) Shelby Rogers

The following player received entry as an alternate:

- (United States) Taylor Townsend

The following players received entry from the qualifying draw:

- (United States) Amanda Anisimova
- (United States) Hailey Baptiste
- (United States) McCartney Kessler
- Kamilla Rakhimova

=== Withdrawals ===
- Anna Kalinskaya → replaced by (United States) Taylor Townsend
- (United States) Madison Keys → replaced by (United States) Ashlyn Krueger
- Veronika Kudermetova → replaced by (China) Wang Yafan
- (China) Zhu Lin → replaced by (United States) Katie Volynets

== WTA doubles main draw entrants ==
=== Seeds ===
Country	Player	Country	Player	Rank^{†}	Seed
USA	Asia Muhammad	USA	Taylor Townsend	39	1
MEX	Giuliana Olmos		Alexandra Panova	65	2
NOR	Ulrikke Eikeri	EST	Ingrid Neel	69	3
JPN	Miyu Kato	INA	Aldila Sutjiadi	74	4

^{†} Rankings are as of 22 July 2024.

=== Other entrants ===
The following pairs received wildcard entry into the doubles main draw:

- (Canada) Eugenie Bouchard / (United States) Sloane Stephens
- (United States) Robin Montgomery / (United States) Clervie Ngounoue
