= 2021 Garden Open =

Tumrani Baloch

- Date: 19–25 April
- Edition: 12th
- Surface: Clay
- Location: Rome, Italy

Champions

Singles
- (Italy) Andrea Pellegrino

Doubles
- (France) Sadio Doumbia / (France) Fabien Reboul
← 2019 ·	Garden Open	· 2021 →

The 2021 Garden Open was a professional tennis tournament played on clay courts. It was the twelfth edition of the tournament which was part of the 2021 ATP Challenger Tour. It took place in Rome, Italy between 19 and 25 April 2021.

== Singles main-draw entrants ==
=== Seeds ===
Country	Player	Rank^{1}	Seed
FRA	Grégoire Barrère	116	1
BOL	Hugo Dellien	122	2
ITA	Paolo Lorenzi	154	3
AUT	Sebastian Ofner	159	4
FRA	Hugo Gaston	160	5
PER	Juan Pablo Varillas	161	6
ITA	Lorenzo Giustino	168	7
CAN	Steven Diez	176	8

- ^{1} Rankings as of 12 April 2021.

=== Other entrants ===
The following players received wildcards into the singles main draw:

- (Italy) Stefano Napolitano
- (Italy) Andrea Pellegrino
- (Italy) Giulio Zeppieri

The following player received entry into the singles main draw using a protected ranking:

- (Australia) Thanasi Kokkinakis

The following player received entry into the singles main draw as a special exempt:

- (France) Mathias Bourgue

The following players received entry into the singles main draw as alternates:

- (Argentina) Andrea Collarini
- (Croatia) Borna Gojo

The following players received entry from the qualifying draw:

- (Italy) Flavio Cobolli
- (Czech Republic) Vít Kopřiva
- (France) Tristan Lamasine
- (Slovakia) Alex Molčan

== Champions ==
=== Singles ===
- (Italy) Andrea Pellegrino def. (France) Hugo Gaston 3–6, 6–2, 6–1.

=== Doubles ===
- (France) Sadio Doumbia / (France) Fabien Reboul def. (Italy) Paolo Lorenzi / (Peru) Juan Pablo Varillas 7–6^{(7–5)}, 7–5.
