= 2021 Garden Open II – Doubles =

Doubles
- 2021 Garden Open II

Final
- Champions: (France) Sadio Doumbia (France) Fabien Reboul
- Runners-up: (Argentina) Guido Andreozzi (Argentina) Guillermo Durán
- Score: 7–5, 6–3

Events
Singles	Doubles
← 2021 ·	Garden Open	· 2022 →

Sadio Doumbia and Fabien Reboul were the defending champions and successfully defended their title, defeating Guido Andreozzi and Guillermo Durán 7–5, 6–3 in the final.

== Seeds ==
1. (United States) Nathaniel Lammons / (United States) Jackson Withrow (semifinals)
2. (Brazil) Rafael Matos / (Brazil) Felipe Meligeni Alves (quarterfinals)
3. (France) Albano Olivetti / (Australia) Matt Reid (quarterfinals)
4. (United States) Robert Galloway / (United States) Alex Lawson (first round)

== Draw ==
=== Key ===
- Q = Qualifier
- WC = Wild card
- LL = Lucky loser
- Alt = Alternate
- SE = Special exempt
- PR = Protected ranking
- ITF = ITF entry
- JE = Junior exempt
- w/o = Walkover
- r = Retired
- d = Defaulted
- SR = Special ranking

First round
1	(United States) N Lammons (United States) J Withrow	7	6
WC	(Italy) S Napolitano (Italy) L Vanni	5	3
(Bolivia) H Dellien (Serbia) D Petrović	3	6^{7}
(France) H Gaston (France) T Lamasine	6	7^{9}
3	(France) A Olivetti (Australia) M Reid	7^{7}	2
WC	(Italy) A Pellegrino (Italy) G Zeppieri	6^{3}	2^{r}
(Monaco) R Arneodo (France) E Couacaud	6	4	[8]
(Argentina) G Andreozzi (Argentina) G Durán	4	6	[10]
(New Zealand) A Sitak (Poland) J Zieliński	6^{4}	6^{4}
(Italy) P Lorenzi (Peru) JP Varillas	7^{7}	7^{7}
(Belgium) R Bemelmans (Sweden) A Göransson	6	2	[11]
4	(United States) R Galloway (United States) A Lawson	2	6	[9]
WC	(Italy) F Cobolli (Italy) M Gigante	5	7^{7}	[7]
(France) S Doumbia (France) F Reboul	7	6^{4}	[10]
(Canada) S Diez (Spain) S Martos Gornés	6	3	[6]
2	(Brazil) R Matos (Brazil) F Meligeni Alves	4	6	[10]

Quarterfinals
1	(United States) N Lammons (United States) J Withrow	4	6	[10]
(France) H Gaston (France) T Lamasine	6	1	[6]
3	(France) A Olivetti (Australia) M Reid	6^{6}	6	[5]
(Argentina) G Andreozzi (Argentina) G Durán	7^{8}	4	[10]
(Italy) P Lorenzi (Peru) JP Varillas	2	7	[2]
(Belgium) R Bemelmans (Sweden) A Göransson	6	5	[10]
(France) S Doumbia (France) F Reboul	7^{7}	5	[10]
2	(Brazil) R Matos (Brazil) F Meligeni Alves	6^{5}	7	[6]

Semifinals
1	(United States) N Lammons (United States) J Withrow	3	4
(Argentina) G Andreozzi (Argentina) G Durán	6	6
(Belgium) R Bemelmans (Sweden) A Göransson	3	6	[7]
(France) S Doumbia (France) F Reboul	6	3	[10]

Final
(Argentina) G Andreozzi (Argentina) G Durán	5	3
(France) S Doumbia (France) F Reboul	7	6
