= 2021 Garden Open – Doubles =

Doubles
- 2021 Garden Open

Final
- Champions: (France) Sadio Doumbia (France) Fabien Reboul
- Runners-up: (Italy) Paolo Lorenzi (Peru) Juan Pablo Varillas
- Score: 7–6^{(7–5)}, 7–5

Events
Singles	Doubles
← 2019 ·	Garden Open	· 2021 →

Philipp Oswald and Filip Polášek were the defending champions but chose not to defend their title.

Sadio Doumbia and Fabien Reboul won the title after defeating Paolo Lorenzi and Juan Pablo Varillas 7–6^{(7–5)}, 7–5 in the final.

== Seeds ==
1. (Sweden) André Göransson / (United States) Nicholas Monroe (first round)
2. (United States) Nathaniel Lammons / (United States) Jackson Withrow (first round)
3. (United Kingdom) Lloyd Glasspool / (Finland) Harri Heliövaara (quarterfinals)
4. (Ukraine) Denys Molchanov / (Kazakhstan) Aleksandr Nedovyesov (first round)

== Draw ==
=== Key ===
- Q = Qualifier
- WC = Wild card
- LL = Lucky loser
- Alt = Alternate
- SE = Special exempt
- PR = Protected ranking
- ITF = ITF entry
- JE = Junior exempt
- w/o = Walkover
- r = Retired
- d = Defaulted
- SR = Special ranking

First round
1	(Sweden) A Göransson (United States) N Monroe	6^{5}	4
(France) S Doumbia (France) F Reboul	7^{7}	6
(Argentina) A Collarini (Bolivia) H Dellien	2	3
(France) G Barrère (France) A Olivetti	6	6
4	(Ukraine) D Molchanov (Kazakhstan) A Nedovyesov	4	3
(Monaco) R Arneodo (France) E Couacaud	6	6
(Russia) T Gabashvili (Italy) L Giustino	4	6	[12]
(Argentina) G Andreozzi (Argentina) G Durán	6	3	[10]
(Australia) M Reid (Ukraine) S Stakhovsky	3	6^{7}
(United States) R Galloway (United States) A Lawson	6	7^{9}
WC	(Italy) Andrea Giallanza (Italy) Francesco Iannini	1	3
3	(United Kingdom) L Glasspool (Finland) H Heliövaara	6	6
WC	(Italy) A Pellegrino (Italy) G Zeppieri	4	7	[10]
WC	(Italy) F Cobolli (Italy) M Gigante	6	5	[7]
(Italy) P Lorenzi (Peru) JP Varillas	6	3	[10]
2	(United States) N Lammons (United States) J Withrow	3	6	[7]

Quarterfinals
(France) S Doumbia (France) F Reboul	7^{7}	7^{7}
(France) G Barrère (France) A Olivetti	6^{4}	6^{2}
(Monaco) R Arneodo (France) E Couacaud	6	6
(Russia) T Gabashvili (Italy) L Giustino	4	4
(United States) R Galloway (United States) A Lawson	6^{2}	6	[10]
3	(United Kingdom) L Glasspool (Finland) H Heliövaara	7^{7}	3	[8]
WC	(Italy) A Pellegrino (Italy) G Zeppieri	6^{5}	3
(Italy) P Lorenzi (Peru) JP Varillas	7^{7}	6

Semifinals
(France) S Doumbia (France) F Reboul	7^{9}	6
(Monaco) R Arneodo (France) E Couacaud	6^{7}	4
(United States) R Galloway (United States) A Lawson	3	3
(Italy) P Lorenzi (Peru) JP Varillas	6	6

Final
(France) S Doumbia (France) F Reboul	7^{7}	7
(Italy) P Lorenzi (Peru) JP Varillas	6^{5}	5
