= 2021 Open Città della Disfida =

- Date: 23–29 August
- Edition: 21st
- Surface: Clay
- Location: Barletta, Italy

Champions

Singles
- (Italy) Giulio Zeppieri

Doubles
- (Italy) Marco Bortolotti / (Colombia) Cristian Rodríguez
← 2019 ·	Open Città della Disfida	· 2022 →

The 2021 Open Città della Disfida was a professional tennis tournament played on clay courts. It was the 21st edition of the tournament which was part of the 2021 ATP Challenger Tour. It took place in Barletta, Italy between 23 and 29 August 2021.

Due to COVID-19 pandemic, the 2020 edition of the tournament was not held and the 2021 edition was rescheduled from the traditional dates in April.

== Singles main-draw entrants ==
=== Seeds ===
Country	Player	Rank^{1}	Seed
SVK	Andrej Martin	118	1
ARG	Juan Manuel Cerúndolo	139	2
GBR	Jay Clarke	219	3
NED	Tim van Rijthoven	259	4
ITA	Matteo Viola	264	5
GBR	Jack Draper	266	6
ITA	Riccardo Bonadio	268	7
TPE	Tseng Chun-hsin	270	8

- ^{1} Rankings are as of 16 August 2021.

=== Other entrants ===
The following players received wildcards into the singles main draw:

- (Italy) Jacopo Berrettini
- (Italy) Emiliano Maggioli
- (Italy) Luca Nardi

The following player received entry into the singles main draw using a protected ranking:

- (Germany) Jeremy Jahn

The following player received entry into the singles main draw as an alternate:

- (Italy) Francesco Forti

The following players received entry from the qualifying draw:

- (Peru) Nicolás Álvarez
- (United States) Ryan Harrison
- (Colombia) Cristian Rodríguez
- (Italy) Andrea Vavassori

== Champions ==
=== Singles ===
- (Italy) Giulio Zeppieri def. (Italy) Flavio Cobolli 6–1, 3–6, 6–3.

=== Doubles ===
- (Italy) Marco Bortolotti / (Colombia) Cristian Rodríguez def. (Netherlands) Gijs Brouwer / (Netherlands) Jelle Sels 6–2, 6–4.
