= 2019 Open Città della Disfida – Doubles =

Doubles
- 2019 Open Città della Disfida

Final
- Champions: (Ukraine) Denys Molchanov (Slovakia) Igor Zelenay
- Runners-up: (Bosnia and Herzegovina) Tomislav Brkić (Croatia) Tomislav Draganja
- Score: 7–6^{(7–1)}, 6–4

Events
Singles	Doubles
← 2018 ·	Open Città della Disfida	· 2021 →

Denys Molchanov and Igor Zelenay were the defending champions and successfully defended their title, defeating Tomislav Brkić and Tomislav Draganja 7–6^{(7–1)}, 6–4 in the final.

== Seeds ==
1. (Ukraine) Denys Molchanov / (Slovakia) Igor Zelenay (champions)
2. (United Kingdom) Scott Clayton / (Brazil) Fernando Romboli (first round)
3. (Bosnia and Herzegovina) Tomislav Brkić / (Croatia) Tomislav Draganja (final)
4. (Lithuania) Laurynas Grigelis / (Czech Republic) Zdeněk Kolář (withdrew)

== Draw ==
=== Key ===
- Q = Qualifier
- WC = Wild card
- LL = Lucky loser
- Alt = Alternate
- SE = Special exempt
- PR = Protected ranking
- ITF = ITF entry
- JE = Junior exempt
- w/o = Walkover
- r = Retired
- d = Defaulted
- SR = Special ranking

First round
1	(Ukraine) D Molchanov (Slovakia) I Zelenay	w/o
(Italy) F Baldi (Italy) A Pellegrino
(Italy) A Arnaboldi (Croatia) V Galović	3	2
ITF	(Germany) Peter Heller (Australia) S Puodziunas	6	6
Alt	(Argentina) A Collarini (Argentina) F Coria	2	0
(Germany) O Otte (Sweden) A Siljeström	6	6
WC	(Italy) Giorgio Portaluri (Italy) Giuseppe Tresca	6	3	[10]
WC	(Italy) L Musetti (Italy) G Zeppieri	4	6	[5]
(Poland) K Drzewiecki (Poland) S Walków	7^{7}	6^{4}	[10]
Alt	(Italy) L Giustino (Croatia) N Serdarušić	6^{1}	7^{7}	[5]
(Italy) J Ocleppo (Italy) S Travaglia	6^{4}	4
3	(Bosnia and Herzegovina) T Brkić (Croatia) T Draganja	7^{7}	6
ITF	(Egypt) K-M Maamoun (Tunisia) S Mansouri	6	6
(Serbia) N Milojević (Egypt) M Safwat	4	3
(Serbia) N Čačić (Austria) J Rodionov	6	6
2	(United Kingdom) S Clayton (Brazil) F Romboli	4	2

Quarterfinals
1	(Ukraine) D Molchanov (Slovakia) I Zelenay	6	7^{7}
ITF	(Germany) P Heller (Australia) S Puodziunas	2	6^{2}
(Germany) O Otte (Sweden) A Siljeström	6^{5}	7^{7}	[10]
WC	(Italy) G Portaluri (Italy) G Tresca	7^{7}	6^{5}	[3]
(Poland) K Drzewiecki (Poland) S Walków	6^{6}	4
3	(Bosnia and Herzegovina) T Brkić (Croatia) T Draganja	7^{8}	6
ITF	(Egypt) K-M Maamoun (Tunisia) S Mansouri	3	3
(Serbia) N Čačić (Austria) J Rodionov	6	6

Semifinals
1	(Ukraine) D Molchanov (Slovakia) I Zelenay	6	6
(Germany) O Otte (Sweden) A Siljeström	3	3
3	(Bosnia and Herzegovina) T Brkić (Croatia) T Draganja	7^{7}	4	[10]
(Serbia) N Čačić (Austria) J Rodionov	6^{4}	6	[7]

Final
1	(Ukraine) D Molchanov (Slovakia) I Zelenay	7^{7}	6
3	(Bosnia and Herzegovina) T Brkić (Croatia) T Draganja	6^{1}	4
