= 2021 Garden Open – Singles =

Singles
- 2021 Garden Open

Final
- Champion: (Italy) Andrea Pellegrino
- Runner-up: (France) Hugo Gaston
- Score: 3–6, 6–2, 6–1

Events
Singles	Doubles
← 2019 ·	Garden Open	· 2021 →

Henri Laaksonen was the defending champion but chose not to defend his title.

Andrea Pellegrino won the title after defeating Hugo Gaston 3–6, 6–2, 6–1 in the final.

== Seeds ==
1. (France) Grégoire Barrère (first round)
2. (Bolivia) Hugo Dellien (first round)
3. (Italy) Paolo Lorenzi (second round)
4. (Austria) Sebastian Ofner (quarterfinals)
5. (France) Hugo Gaston (final)
6. (Peru) Juan Pablo Varillas (semifinals)
7. (Italy) Lorenzo Giustino (quarterfinals)
8. (Canada) Steven Diez (first round)

== Draw ==
=== Key ===
- Q = Qualifier
- WC = Wild card
- LL = Lucky loser
- Alt = Alternate
- SE = Special exempt
- PR = Protected ranking
- ITF = ITF entry
- JE = Junior exempt
- w/o = Walkover
- r = Retired
- d = Defaulted
- SR = Special ranking

=== Finals ===
Semifinals
6	(Peru) Juan Pablo Varillas	4	5
5	(France) Hugo Gaston	6	7
WC	(Italy) Andrea Pellegrino	3	6	6
Q	(Czech Republic) Vít Kopřiva	6	1	1

Final
5	(France) Hugo Gaston	6	2	1
WC	(Italy) Andrea Pellegrino	3	6	6

=== Top half ===
First round
1	(France) G Barrère	6^{4}	4
(Argentina) G Andreozzi	7^{7}	6
(France) E Couacaud	3	3
(Sweden) E Ymer	6	6
Alt	(Croatia) B Gojo	2	3
(Italy) R Marcora	6	6
Alt	(Argentina) A Collarini	2	6	2
6	(Peru) JP Varillas	6	3	6
3	(Italy) P Lorenzi	7^{7}	2	6
(Germany) Y Maden	6^{4}	6	3
(Australia) A Bolt	3	4
Q	(France) T Lamasine	6	6
PR	(Australia) T Kokkinakis	6	6
(United Kingdom) J Clarke	2	4
(United States) E Escobedo	3	4
5	(France) H Gaston	6	6

Second round
(Argentina) G Andreozzi	5	7^{8}	2
(Sweden) E Ymer	7	6^{6}	6
(Italy) R Marcora	3	0
6	(Peru) JP Varillas	6	6
3	(Italy) P Lorenzi	6	1	5
Q	(France) T Lamasine	4	6	7
PR	(Australia) T Kokkinakis	2	3
5	(France) H Gaston	6	6

Quarterfinals
(Sweden) E Ymer	4	3
6	(Peru) JP Varillas	6	6
Q	(France) T Lamasine	2	6^{6}
5	(France) H Gaston	6	7^{8}

Semifinals
6	(Peru) JP Varillas	4	5
5	(France) H Gaston	6	7

=== Bottom half ===
First round
8	(Canada) S Diez	6	2	3
WC	(Italy) A Pellegrino	1	6	6
Q	(Italy) F Cobolli	7	5
(Australia) A Vukic	5	0^{r}
WC	(Italy) G Zeppieri	6	6
WC	(Italy) S Napolitano	3	4
Q	(Slovakia) A Molčan	7^{9}	0	3
4	(Austria) S Ofner	6^{7}	6	6
7	(Italy) L Giustino	7^{7}	7
(Slovakia) F Horanský	6^{2}	5
(Ukraine) S Stakhovsky	6	3	7
SE	(France) M Bourgue	4	6	5
(Australia) B Tomic	6	6
(Belgium) R Bemelmans	3	4
Q	(Czech Republic) V Kopřiva	7^{7}	6
2	(Bolivia) H Dellien	6^{4}	3

Second round
WC	(Italy) A Pellegrino	7^{9}	6
Q	(Italy) F Cobolli	6^{7}	1
WC	(Italy) G Zeppieri	3	5
4	(Austria) S Ofner	6	7
7	(Italy) L Giustino	6	6
(Ukraine) S Stakhovsky	4	4
(Australia) B Tomic	3	3
Q	(Czech Republic) V Kopřiva	6	6

Quarterfinals
WC	(Italy) A Pellegrino	2	6	6
4	(Austria) S Ofner	6	2	3
7	(Italy) L Giustino	6	5	3
Q	(Czech Republic) V Kopřiva	1	7	6

Semifinals
WC	(Italy) A Pellegrino	3	6	6
Q	(Czech Republic) V Kopřiva	6	1	1
