= 2021 Garden Open II – Singles =

Singles
- 2021 Garden Open II

Final
- Champion: (Argentina) Juan Manuel Cerúndolo
- Runner-up: (Italy) Flavio Cobolli
- Score: 6–2, 3–6, 6–3

Events
Singles	Doubles
← 2021 ·	Garden Open	· 2022 →

Andrea Pellegrino was the defending champion but lost in the quarterfinals to Flavio Cobolli.

Juan Manuel Cerúndolo won the title after defeating Cobolli 6–2, 3–6, 6–3 in the final.

== Seeds ==
1. (Bosnia and Herzegovina) Damir Džumhur (first round)
2. (Bolivia) Hugo Dellien (first round)
3. (Italy) Federico Gaio (second round)
4. (Serbia) Danilo Petrović (second round)
5. (France) Hugo Gaston (first round)
6. (Italy) Paolo Lorenzi (first round)
7. (Peru) Juan Pablo Varillas (first round)
8. (Italy) Alessandro Giannessi (semifinals)

== Draw ==
=== Key ===
- Q = Qualifier
- WC = Wild card
- LL = Lucky loser
- Alt = Alternate
- SE = Special exempt
- PR = Protected ranking
- ITF = ITF entry
- JE = Junior exempt
- w/o = Walkover
- r = Retired
- d = Defaulted
- SR = Special ranking

=== Finals ===
Semifinals
(Turkey) Cem İlkel	3	5
WC	(Italy) Flavio Cobolli	6	7
8	(Italy) Alessandro Giannessi	6	4	5
(Argentina) Juan Manuel Cerúndolo	4	6	7

Final
WC	(Italy) Flavio Cobolli	2	6	3
(Argentina) Juan Manuel Cerúndolo	6	3	6

=== Top half ===
First round
1	(Bosnia and Herzegovina) D Džumhur	2	7^{7}	3
Q	(Croatia) N Serdarušić	6	6^{1}	6
(Australia) A Vukic	4	1
(Italy) R Marcora	6	6
(Germany) D Masur	6	4	6^{2}
(Turkey) C İlkel	4	6	7^{7}
(Italy) L Giustino	6	7
7	(Peru) JP Varillas	1	5
4	(Serbia) D Petrović	6	7^{8}
Q	(Netherlands) I Sijsling	1	6^{6}
WC	(Italy) F Cobolli	6	6
(Canada) S Diez	4	1
SE	(Italy) A Pellegrino	6	4	6
WC	(Italy) S Napolitano	4	6	4
Alt	(Argentina) A Collarini	6	6
5	(France) H Gaston	1	4

Second round
Q	(Croatia) N Serdarušić	4	6	6
(Italy) R Marcora	6	1	4
(Turkey) C İlkel	6	6
(Italy) L Giustino	4	2
4	(Serbia) D Petrović	2	2
WC	(Italy) F Cobolli	6	6
SE	(Italy) A Pellegrino	6	6^{4}	6
Alt	(Argentina) A Collarini	3	7^{7}	4

Quarterfinals
Q	(Croatia) N Serdarušić	6^{3}	6	3
(Turkey) C İlkel	7^{7}	3	6
WC	(Italy) F Cobolli	7^{7}	6
SE	(Italy) A Pellegrino	6^{3}	1

Semifinals
(Turkey) C İlkel	3	5
WC	(Italy) F Cobolli	6	7

=== Bottom half ===
First round
8	(Italy) A Giannessi	6	6
(Argentina) G Andreozzi	3	3
(Australia) A Bolt	0	3
(United Kingdom) J Clarke	6	6
PR	(Australia) T Kokkinakis	6	6
(Germany) Y Maden	3	2
(Belgium) R Bemelmans	6	3	2
3	(Italy) F Gaio	3	6	6
6	(Italy) P Lorenzi	4	0
(France) A Müller	6	6
(Argentina) JM Cerúndolo	7	7
Q	(France) T Lamasine	5	5
Q	(Brazil) F Meligeni Alves	6	6
(France) E Couacaud	3	4
WC	(Italy) G Zeppieri	1	6	6
2	(Bolivia) H Dellien	6	3	4

Second round
8	(Italy) A Giannessi	6	6
(United Kingdom) J Clarke	2	4
PR	(Australia) T Kokkinakis	6^{8}	6	6
3	(Italy) F Gaio	7^{10}	3	4
(France) A Müller	4	3
(Argentina) JM Cerúndolo	6	6
Q	(Brazil) F Meligeni Alves	4	3
WC	(Italy) G Zeppieri	6	6

Quarterfinals
8	(Italy) A Giannessi	7	3	7
PR	(Australia) T Kokkinakis	5	6	5
(Argentina) JM Cerúndolo	6	6
WC	(Italy) G Zeppieri	0	3

Semifinals
8	(Italy) A Giannessi	6	4	5
(Argentina) JM Cerúndolo	4	6	7
