= 2024 Mubadala Citi DC Open – Men's singles =

Men's singles
- 2024 Mubadala Citi DC Open

Final
- Champion: (United States) Sebastian Korda
- Runner-up: (Italy) Flavio Cobolli
- Score: 4–6, 6–2, 6–0

Details
- Draw: 48 (6Q / 4WC)
- Seeds: 16

Events
Singles	men	women
Doubles	men	women
← 2023 ·	Washington Open	· 2025 →

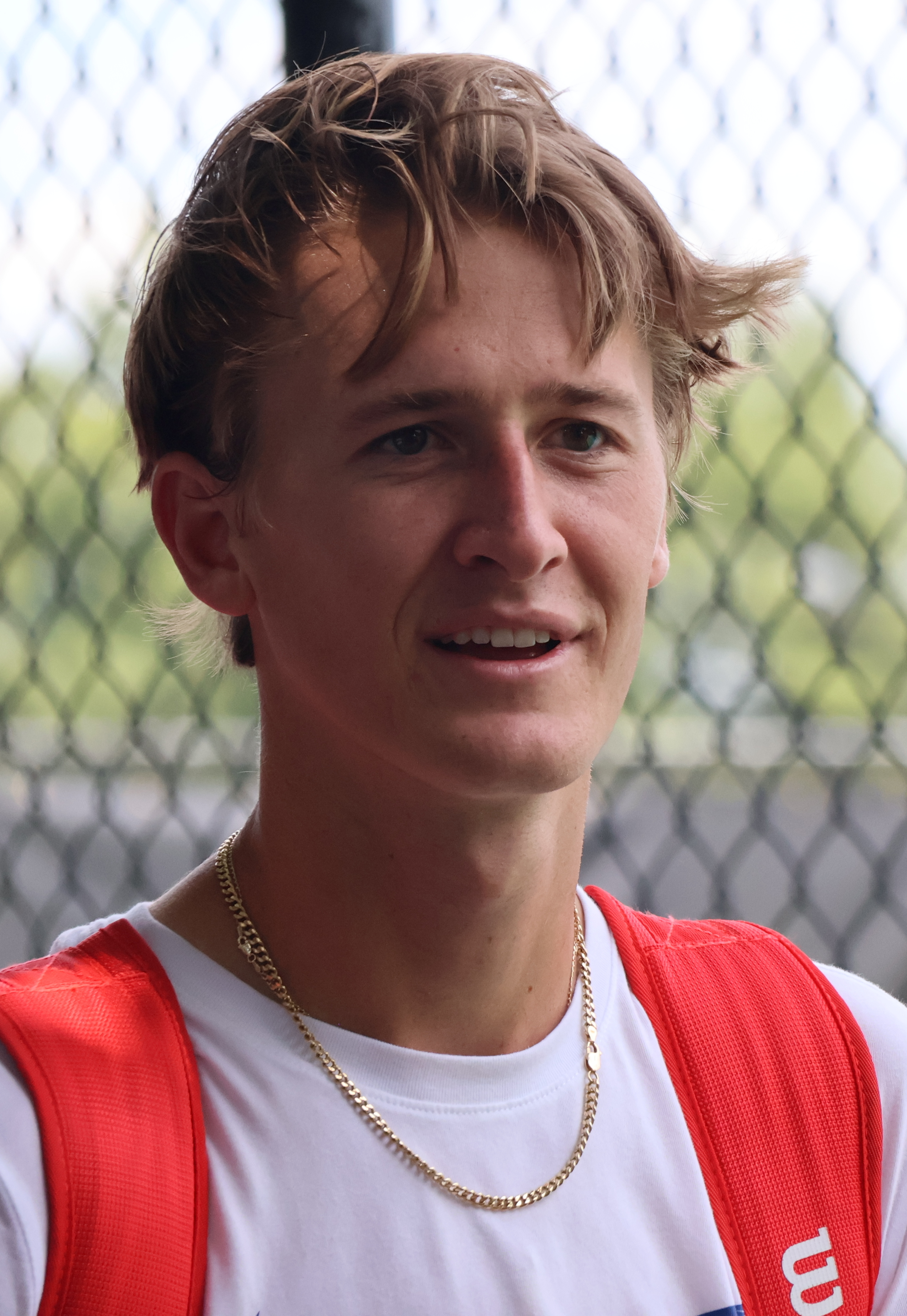
Sebastian Korda won the title.

Sebastian Korda defeated Flavio Cobolli in the final, 4–6, 6–2, 6–0 to win the men's singles tennis title at the 2024 Washington Open. It was Korda's second ATP Tour title, first ATP 500 title, first title since 2021, and first hardcourt title after previous five hardcourt runner-up finishes. Both players saved match points en route to the final: Korda saved two in his third-round match against Thanasi Kokkinakis, while Cobolli saved five in his third-round match against Alejandro Davidovich Fokina. Korda's father Petr won the title at the same tournament in 1992, marking the first time that a father-son duo won the same ATP tournament.

Dan Evans was the reigning champion, but chose to compete in the Olympic Games instead.

== Seeds ==
All seeds received a bye into the second round.

1. Andrey Rublev (quarterfinals)
2. (United States) Ben Shelton (semifinals)
3. Karen Khachanov (second round)
4. (United States) Sebastian Korda (champion)
5. (United States) Frances Tiafoe (semifinals)
6. (France) Adrian Mannarino (second round)
7. (Australia) Jordan Thompson (quarterfinals)
8. (Spain) Alejandro Davidovich Fokina (third round)
9. (France) Giovanni Mpetshi Perricard (third round)
10. (Italy) Flavio Cobolli (final)
11. (Spain) Roberto Carballés Baena (second round)
12. (Serbia) Miomir Kecmanović (third round)
13. (United States) Brandon Nakashima (third round)
14. (Australia) Aleksandar Vukic (second round)
15. (United States) Alex Michelsen (quarterfinals)
16. (France) Arthur Rinderknech (third round)

Click on the seed number of a player to go to their draw section.

== Draw ==
=== Key ===
- Q = Qualifier
- WC = Wild card
- LL = Lucky loser
- Alt = Alternate
- ITF = ITF entry
- PR = Protected ranking
- SR = Special ranking
- SE = Special exempt
- JE = Junior exempt
- JR = Junior Accelerator Programme entrant
- CO = College Accelerator Programme entrant
- NG = Next Gen Accelerator Program entrant
- w/o = Walkover
- r = Retired
- d = Defaulted

=== Finals ===
Quarterfinals
1/WC	Andrey Rublev	4	6^{3}
5	(United States) Frances Tiafoe	6	7^{7}
4	(United States) Sebastian Korda	6	6
7	(Australia) Jordan Thompson	4	2
10	(Italy) Flavio Cobolli	7	3	7^{7}
15	(United States) Alex Michelsen	5	6	6^{2}
WC	(Canada) Denis Shapovalov	6^{5}	6^{d}
2	(United States) Ben Shelton	7^{7}	6

Semifinals
5	(United States) Frances Tiafoe	4	4
4	(United States) Sebastian Korda	6	6
10	(Italy) Flavio Cobolli	4	7	6
2	(United States) Ben Shelton	6	5	3

Final
4	(United States) Sebastian Korda	4	6	6
10	(Italy) Flavio Cobolli	6	2	0

=== Top half ===
==== Section 1 ====
First round
(France) L Van Assche	6	6
(France) A Cazaux	4	3
(China) J Shang	6	6
Q	(Sweden) E Ymer	4	3
(United States) A Kovacevic	4	6	6
(Japan) Y Nishioka	6	4	2
Q	(United States) M Cressy	4	3
(Colombia) DE Galán	6	6

Second round
1/WC	A Rublev	4	6	6
(France) L Van Assche	6	3	4
(China) J Shang	3^{r}
16	(France) A Rinderknech	2
11	(Spain) R Carballés Baena	6^{4}	6^{3}
(United States) A Kovacevic	7^{7}	7^{7}
(Colombia) DE Galán	7^{10}	3	3
5	(United States) F Tiafoe	6^{8}	6	6

Third round
1/WC	A Rublev	7^{7}	6
16	(France) A Rinderknech	6^{4}	4
(United States) A Kovacevic	6^{3}	6	3
5	(United States) F Tiafoe	7^{7}	4	6

Quarterfinals
1/WC	A Rublev	4	6^{3}
5	(United States) F Tiafoe	6	7^{7}

==== Section 2 ====
First round
A Karatsev	4	2
(Chile) C Garín	6	6
(Australia) M Purcell	7^{7}	4	3
(Australia) T Kokkinakis	6^{4}	6	6
(Finland) E Ruusuvuori	6^{4}	7^{10}	6
(Croatia) B Ćorić	7^{7}	6^{8}	4
WC	(United States) R Opelka	6^{12}	7	6
(Australia) J Duckworth	7^{14}	5	4

Second round
4	(United States) S Korda	6	6
(Chile) C Garín	3	2
(Australia) T Kokkinakis	6	7^{7}
14	(Australia) A Vukic	4	6^{4}
9	(France) G Mpetshi Perricard	7^{8}	7^{8}
(Finland) E Ruusuvuori	6^{6}	6^{6}
WC	(United States) R Opelka	4	3
7	(Australia) J Thompson	6	6

Third round
4	(United States) S Korda	6^{1}	7	3
(Australia) T Kokkinakis	7^{7}	5	2^{r}
9	(France) G Mpetshi Perricard	5	4
7	(Australia) J Thompson	7	6

Quarterfinals
4	(United States) S Korda	6	6
7	(Australia) J Thompson	4	2

=== Bottom half ===
==== Section 3 ====
First round
Q	(United States) M Krueger	7^{7}	4
(Italy) L Nardi	6^{3}	1^{r}
(Belgium) D Goffin	6	7
(Argentina) C Ugo Carabelli	2	5
Q	(Italy) M Bellucci	7^{7}	7^{7}
(United States) M McDonald	6^{4}	6^{3}
(Australia) A Walton	6^{6}	6^{4}
Q	(South Korea) S-c Hong	7^{8}	7^{7}

Second round
8/WC	(Spain) A Davidovich Fokina	3	7^{7}	6
Q	(United States) M Krueger	6	6^{3}	4
(Belgium) D Goffin	6^{4}	3
10	(Italy) F Cobolli	7^{7}	6
15	(United States) A Michelsen	6	7^{7}
Q	(Italy) M Bellucci	3	6^{1}
Q	(South Korea) S-c Hong	6	6
3	K Khachanov	2	4

Third round
8/WC	(Spain) A Davidovich Fokina	6	6^{0}	6^{7}
10	(Italy) F Cobolli	1	7^{7}	7^{9}
15	(United States) A Michelsen	6	6
Q	(South Korea) S-c Hong	3	3

Quarterfinals
10	(Italy) F Cobolli	7	3	7^{7}
15	(United States) A Michelsen	5	6	6^{2}

==== Section 4 ====
First round
WC	(Canada) D Shapovalov	6	6
(Spain) R Bautista Agut	1	4
LL	(United States) Z Svajda	4	5
WC	(United States) JJ Wolf	6	7
(Australia) C O'Connell	6	7^{7}
(France) H Mayot	4	6^{3}
Q	(Moldova) R Albot	7^{7}	6
(Argentina) F Díaz Acosta	6^{5}	3

Second round
6	(France) A Mannarino	2	1
WC	(Canada) D Shapovalov	6	6
WC	(United States) JJ Wolf	2	3
12	(Serbia) M Kecmanović	6	6
13	(United States) B Nakashima	6	6
(Australia) C O'Connell	2	2
Q	(Moldova) R Albot	4	7^{7}	3
2	(United States) B Shelton	6	6^{5}	6

Third round
WC	(Canada) D Shapovalov	4	6	6
12	(Serbia) M Kecmanović	6	4	2
13	(United States) B Nakashima	6^{5}	6^{4}
2	(United States) B Shelton	7^{7}	7^{7}

Quarterfinals
WC	(Canada) D Shapovalov	6^{5}	6^{d}
2	(United States) B Shelton	7^{7}	6

== Qualifying ==
=== Seeds ===
1. (Spain) Roberto Bautista Agut (moved to main draw)
2. (United Kingdom) Billy Harris (first round)
3. (United States) Zachary Svajda (qualifying competition, lucky loser)
4. (France) Térence Atmane (qualifying competition)
5. (Switzerland) Leandro Riedi (qualifying competition)
6. (France) Benjamin Bonzi (first round)
7. (Italy) Mattia Bellucci (qualified)
8. (Moldova) Radu Albot (qualified)
9. (Kazakhstan) Denis Yevseyev (first round)
10. (Japan) Shintaro Mochizuki (qualifying competition)
11. (United States) Maxime Cressy (qualified)
12. (Australia) Alex Bolt (first round)

=== Qualifiers ===
1. (United States) Maxime Cressy
2. (South Korea) Hong Seong-chan
3. (United States) Mitchell Krueger
4. (Moldova) Radu Albot
5. (Italy) Mattia Bellucci
6. (Sweden) Elias Ymer

=== Lucky loser ===
1. (United States) Zachary Svajda

=== Draw ===
==== First qualifier ====
First round
Alt	(Australia) Marc Polmans	3	7	6
WC	(United States) Thai-Son Kwiatkowski	6	5	2
(Australia) Tristan Schoolkate	1	2
11	(United States) Maxime Cressy	6	6

Qualifying competition
Alt	(Australia) Marc Polmans	3	6	0
11	(United States) Maxime Cressy	6	2	6

==== Second qualifier ====
First round
2	(United Kingdom) Billy Harris	3	5
(United Kingdom) Paul Jubb	6	7
(South Korea) Hong Seong-chan	6	6
12/Alt	(Australia) Alex Bolt	4	4

Qualifying competition
(United Kingdom) Paul Jubb	4	5
(South Korea) Hong Seong-chan	6	7

==== Third qualifier ====
First round
3	(United States) Zachary Svajda	6	6
Alt	(Japan) Yasutaka Uchiyama	4	3
(United States) Mitchell Krueger	6	6
9	(Kazakhstan) Denis Yevseyev	2	4

Qualifying competition
3	(United States) Zachary Svajda	2	2
(United States) Mitchell Krueger	6	6

==== Fourth qualifier ====
First round
4	(France) Térence Atmane	7^{7}	6
(United Kingdom) Liam Broady	6^{4}	4
WC	(United States) Eliot Spizzirri	0	2
8	(Moldova) Radu Albot	6	6

Qualifying competition
4	(France) Térence Atmane	6	3	5
8	(Moldova) Radu Albot	2	6	7

==== Fifth qualifier ====
First round
5	(Switzerland) Leandro Riedi	6	6
(Netherlands) Gijs Brouwer	3	2
WC	(United States) Tristan Boyer	6^{6}	2
7	(Italy) Mattia Bellucci	7^{8}	6

Qualifying competition
5	(Switzerland) Leandro Riedi	7^{7}	3	6^{4}
7	(Italy) Mattia Bellucci	6^{4}	6	7^{7}

==== Sixth qualifier ====
First round
6	(France) Benjamin Bonzi	6	3	2
Alt	(Sweden) Elias Ymer	4	6	6
WC	(United States) Andrew Fenty	6	6^{4}	0^{r}
10	(Japan) Shintaro Mochizuki	3	7^{7}	0

Qualifying competition
Alt	(Sweden) Elias Ymer	6	6
10	(Japan) Shintaro Mochizuki	3	0
