= 2024 Mubadala Citi DC Open – Women's singles =

Women's singles
- 2024 Mubadala Citi DC Open

Final
- Champion: (Spain) Paula Badosa
- Runner-up: (Czech Republic) Marie Bouzková
- Score: 6–1, 4–6, 6–4

Details
- Draw: 28 (4Q / 4WC)
- Seeds: 8

Events
Singles	men	women
Doubles	men	women
← 2023 ·	Washington Open	· 2025 →

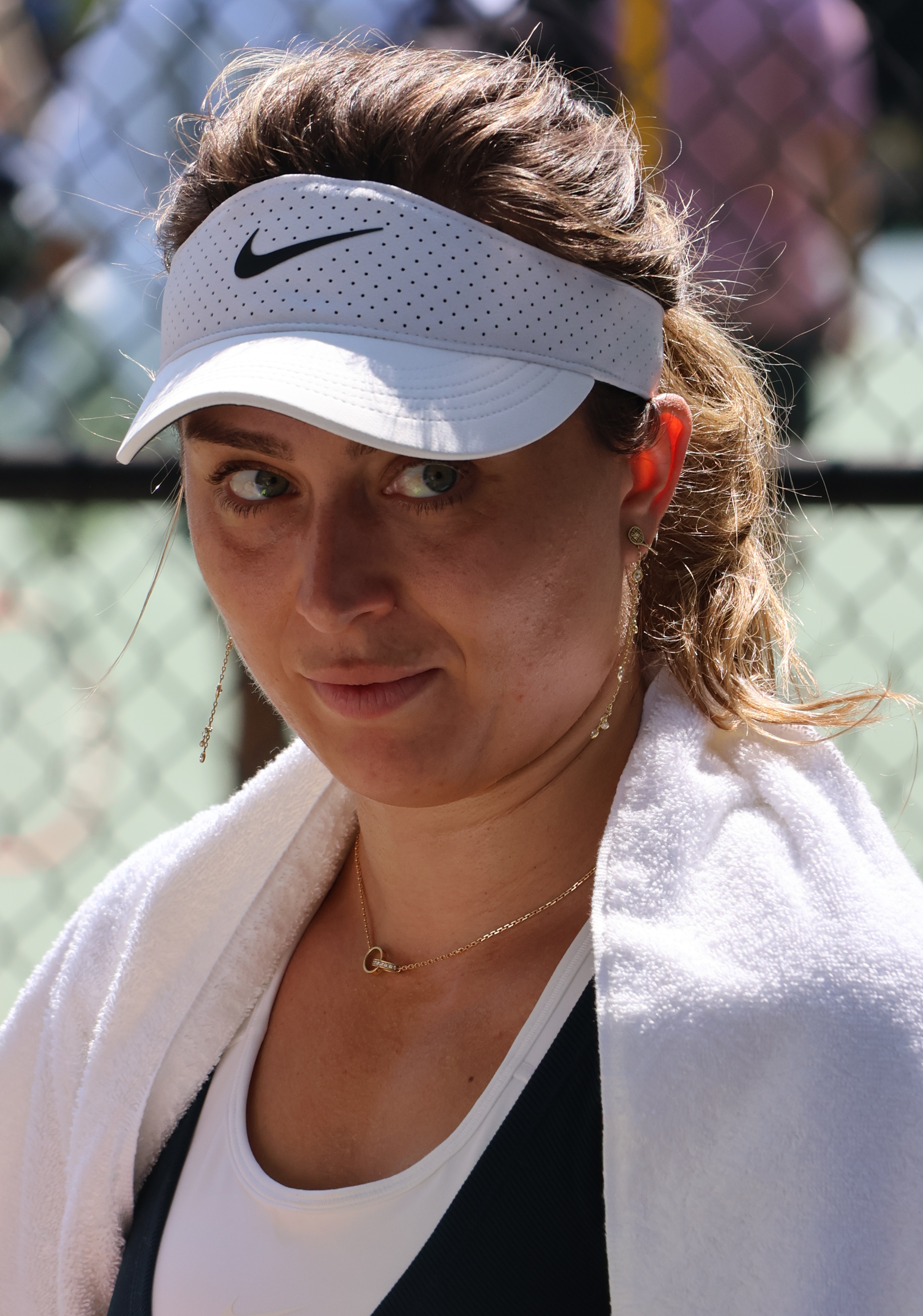
Paula Badosa won the title.

Paula Badosa defeated Marie Bouzková in the final, 6–1, 4–6, 6–4 to win the women's singles tennis title at the 2024 Washington Open. It was her fourth career WTA Tour title and her first since January 2022. Badosa was the second wildcard to win the tournament, after Nadia Petrova in 2011.

Coco Gauff was the defending champion, but chose to compete at the Olympic Games instead.

== Seeds ==
The top four seeds received a bye into the second round.

1. Aryna Sabalenka (semifinals)
2. Daria Kasatkina (second round)
3. Liudmila Samsonova (second round, retired)
4. (Tunisia) Ons Jabeur (second round, withdrew)
5. Anna Kalinskaya (withdrew)
6. Victoria Azarenka (quarterfinals)
7. Anastasia Pavlyuchenkova (second round)
8. (Belgium) Elise Mertens (first round)
9. Anastasia Potapova (first round)

== Draw ==
=== Key ===
- Q = Qualifier
- WC = Wild card
- LL = Lucky loser
- Alt = Alternate
- ITF = ITF entry
- PR = Protected ranking
- SR = Special ranking
- SE = Special exempt
- JE = Junior exempt
- JR = Junior Accelerator Programme entrant
- CO = College Accelerator Programme entrant
- NG = Next Gen Accelerator Program entrant
- w/o = Walkover
- r = Retired
- d = Defaulted

=== Finals ===
Semifinals
1	Aryna Sabalenka	4	6	3
(Czech Republic) Marie Bouzková	6	3	6
WC	(Spain) Paula Badosa	6	6
(United States) Caroline Dolehide	3	3

Final
(Czech Republic) Marie Bouzková	1	6	4
WC	(Spain) Paula Badosa	6	4	6

=== Top half ===
First round
(United States) K Volynets	4	3
Q	K Rakhimova	6	6
(China) Y Wang	5	6	6
(Czech Republic) Ka Plíšková	7	3	0
Q	(United States) H Baptiste	6^{6}	6^{3}
6	V Azarenka	7^{8}	7^{7}
PR	(United States) S Rogers	5	3
WC	(United States) R Montgomery	7	6
Q	(United States) M Kessler	4	6	2
(Czech Republic) M Bouzková	6	4	6
Alt	(United States) T Townsend	6	6
9	A Potapova	2	2

Second round
1	A Sabalenka	7	4	6
Q	K Rakhimova	5	6	4
(China) Y Wang	1	7^{7}	3
6	V Azarenka	6	6^{5}	6
4	(Tunisia) O Jabeur
WC	(United States) R Montgomery	w/o
(Czech Republic) M Bouzková	7	7^{10}
Alt	(United States) T Townsend	5	6^{8}

Quarterfinals
1	A Sabalenka	6	6
6	V Azarenka	4	4
WC	(United States) R Montgomery	3	1
(Czech Republic) M Bouzková	6	6

Semifinals
1	A Sabalenka	4	6	3
(Czech Republic) M Bouzková	6	3	6

=== Bottom half ===
First round
8	(Belgium) E Mertens	2	6	4
WC	(United Kingdom) E Raducanu	6	3	6
WC	(United States) C Ngounoue	3	6^{3}
(United States) P Stearns	6	7^{7}
WC	(Spain) P Badosa	6	7^{8}
(United States) S Kenin	1	6^{6}
7	A Pavlyuchenkova	6	4	6
(United States) A Krueger	3	6	4
(United States) S Stephens	3	5
Q	(United States) A Anisimova	6	7
(Ukraine) L Tsurenko	1	6	4
(United States) C Dolehide	6	3	6

Second round
WC	(United Kingdom) E Raducanu	7^{8}	6
(United States) P Stearns	6^{6}	2
WC	(Spain) P Badosa	6	0
3	L Samsonova	2	0^{r}
7	A Pavlyuchenkova	1	7^{7}	4
Q	(United States) A Anisimova	6	6^{4}	6
(United States) C Dolehide	2	7	6
2	D Kasatkina	6	5	0

Quarterfinals
WC	(United Kingdom) E Raducanu	6	5	4
WC	(Spain) P Badosa	4	7	6
Q	(United States) A Anisimova	6^{5}	1
(United States) C Dolehide	7^{7}	6

Semifinals
WC	(Spain) P Badosa	6	6
(United States) C Dolehide	3	3

== Qualifying ==
=== Seeds ===
1. (Germany) Jule Niemeier (first round)
2. (Mexico) Renata Zarazúa (qualifying competition)
3. (Japan) Nao Hibino (qualifying competition)
4. (United States) Hailey Baptiste (qualified)
5. Kamilla Rakhimova (qualified)
6. (Australia) Arina Rodionova (qualifying competition)
7. (United States) McCartney Kessler (qualified)
8. (United States) Emina Bektas (first round)

=== Qualifiers ===
1. Kamilla Rakhimova
2. (United States) Amanda Anisimova
3. (United States) McCartney Kessler
4. (United States) Hailey Baptiste

=== Qualifying draw ===
==== First qualifier ====
First round
1	(Germany) Jule Niemeier	5	2
(United States) Sachia Vickery	7	6
(Sweden) Mirjam Björklund	6^{8}	0
5	Kamilla Rakhimova	7^{10}	6

Qualifying competition
(United States) Sachia Vickery	3	0^{r}
5	Kamilla Rakhimova	6	1

==== Second qualifier ====
First round
2	(Mexico) Renata Zarazúa	6	6
(Colombia) Emiliana Arango	1	4
WC	(United States) Amanda Anisimova	7^{7}	6
8	(United States) Emina Bektas	6^{2}	3

Qualifying competition
2	(Mexico) Renata Zarazúa	4	4
WC	(United States) Amanda Anisimova	6	6

==== Third qualifier ====
First round
3	(Japan) Nao Hibino	3	6	6
(Australia) Kimberly Birrell	6	4	2
WC	(United States) Louisa Chirico	2	6	6^{4}
7	(United States) McCartney Kessler	6	3	7^{7}

Qualifying competition
3	(Japan) Nao Hibino	6	3	3
7	(United States) McCartney Kessler	3	6	6

==== Fourth qualifier ====
First round
4	(United States) Hailey Baptiste	6	6
(Australia) Taylah Preston	4	3
(Canada) Marina Stakusic	1	3
6	(Australia) Arina Rodionova	6	6

Qualifying competition
4	(United States) Hailey Baptiste	7^{7}	7
6	(Australia) Arina Rodionova	6^{4}	5
