= 2021 Garden Open II =

- Date: 26 April – 2 May
- Edition: 13th
- Surface: Clay
- Location: Rome, Italy

Champions

Singles
- (Argentina) Juan Manuel Cerúndolo

Doubles
- (France) Sadio Doumbia / (France) Fabien Reboul
← 2021 ·	Garden Open	· 2022 →

The 2021 Garden Open II was a professional tennis tournament played on clay courts. It was the thirteenth edition of the tournament which was part of the 2021 ATP Challenger Tour. It took place in Rome, Italy between 26 April and 2 May 2021.

== Singles main-draw entrants ==
=== Seeds ===
Country	Player	Rank^{1}	Seed
BIH	Damir Džumhur	116	1
BOL	Hugo Dellien	125	2
ITA	Federico Gaio	138	3
SRB	Danilo Petrović	157	4
FRA	Hugo Gaston	158	5
ITA	Paolo Lorenzi	159	6
PER	Juan Pablo Varillas	160	7
ITA	Alessandro Giannessi	165	8

- ^{1} Rankings as of 19 April 2021.

=== Other entrants ===
The following players received wildcards into the singles main draw:

- (Italy) Flavio Cobolli
- (Italy) Stefano Napolitano
- (Italy) Giulio Zeppieri

The following player received entry into the singles main draw as a special exempt:

- (Italy) Andrea Pellegrino

The following player received entry into the singles main draw using a protected ranking:

- (Australia) Thanasi Kokkinakis

The following player received entry into the singles main draw as an alternate:

- (Argentina) Andrea Collarini

The following players received entry from the qualifying draw:

- (France) Tristan Lamasine
- (Brazil) Felipe Meligeni Alves
- (Croatia) Nino Serdarušić
- (Netherlands) Igor Sijsling

== Champions ==
=== Singles ===
- (Argentina) Juan Manuel Cerúndolo def. (Italy) Flavio Cobolli 6–2, 3–6, 6–3.

=== Doubles ===
- (France) Sadio Doumbia / (France) Fabien Reboul def. (Argentina) Guido Andreozzi / (Argentina) Guillermo Durán 7–5, 6–3.
