= 2019 Open Città della Disfida – Singles =

Singles
- 2019 Open Città della Disfida

Final
- Champion: (Italy) Gianluca Mager
- Runner-up: (Serbia) Nikola Milojević
- Score: 7–6^{(9–7)}, 5–7, 3–2 ret.

Events
Singles	Doubles
← 2018 ·	Open Città della Disfida	· 2021 →

Marco Trungelliti was the defending champion but chose not to defend his title.

Gianluca Mager won the title after Nikola Milojević retired at 7–6^{(9–7)}, 5–7, 3–2 in the final.

== Seeds ==
All seeds receive a bye into the second round.

1. (Italy) Gianluigi Quinzi (third round)
2. (Germany) Oscar Otte (third round)
3. (Italy) Stefano Travaglia (third round)
4. (Italy) Filippo Baldi (third round)
5. (Italy) Alessandro Giannessi (withdrew)
6. (Italy) Lorenzo Giustino (third round)
7. (Italy) Andrea Arnaboldi (third round, retired)
8. (Italy) Gianluca Mager (champion)
9. (Serbia) Nikola Milojević (final, retired)
10. (Australia) Thanasi Kokkinakis (third round, withdrew)
11. (Austria) Jurij Rodionov (second round)
12. (Slovakia) Filip Horanský (quarterfinals)
13. (Italy) Stefano Napolitano (quarterfinals)
14. (Croatia) Viktor Galović (semifinals)
15. (Germany) Mats Moraing (second round)
16. (Egypt) Mohamed Safwat (semifinals)

== Draw ==
=== Key ===
- Q = Qualifier
- WC = Wild card
- LL = Lucky loser
- Alt = Alternate
- SE = Special exempt
- PR = Protected ranking
- ITF = ITF entry
- JE = Junior exempt
- w/o = Walkover
- r = Retired
- d = Defaulted
- SR = Special ranking

=== Finals ===
Quarterfinals
16	(Egypt) Mohamed Safwat	6	6
WC	(Italy) Jacopo Berrettini	1	3
(Argentina) Federico Coria	6^{4}	1
9	(Serbia) Nikola Milojević	7^{7}	6
12	(Slovakia) Filip Horanský	4	6^{3}
14	(Croatia) Viktor Galović	6	7^{7}
8	(Italy) Gianluca Mager	7^{7}	6
13	(Italy) Stefano Napolitano	6^{4}	3

Semifinals
16	(Egypt) Mohamed Safwat	2	5
9	(Serbia) Nikola Milojević	6	7
14	(Croatia) Viktor Galović	3	4
8	(Italy) Gianluca Mager	6	6

Final
9	(Serbia) Nikola Milojević	6^{7}	7	2^{r}
8	(Italy) Gianluca Mager	7^{9}	5	3

=== Top half ===
==== Section 1 ====
First round
ITF	(Tunisia) S Mansouri	4	6	6^{2}
ITF	(Kazakhstan) D Yevseyev	6	3	7^{7}
(Croatia) N Serdarušić	6	7^{7}
(Slovakia) N Gombos	1	6^{4}
(Italy) R Marcora	4	6	2^{r}
WC	(Italy) J Berrettini	6	1	4
Q	(Germany) J Härteis	4	4
(Italy) A Pellegrino	6	6

Second round
1	(Italy) G Quinzi	6	4	7
ITF	(Kazakhstan) D Yevseyev	2	6	5
(Croatia) N Serdarušić	5	2
16	(Egypt) M Safwat	7	6
11	(Austria) J Rodionov	3	4
WC	(Italy) J Berrettini	6	6
(Italy) A Pellegrino	1^{r}
6	(Italy) L Giustino	5

Third round
1	(Italy) G Quinzi	4	3
16	(Egypt) M Safwat	6	6
WC	(Italy) J Berrettini	4	7^{7}	6
6	(Italy) L Giustino	6	6^{2}	4

Quarterfinals
16	(Egypt) M Safwat	6	6
WC	(Italy) J Berrettini	1	3

==== Section 2 ====
First round
(Argentina) A Collarini	6	6
(France) E Couacaud	4	2
(Argentina) F Coria	6^{6}	6	6
(Netherlands) T de Bakker	7^{8}	3	1
ITF	(Egypt) K-M Maamoun	4	7^{7}	6
(Czech Republic) V Šafránek	6	6^{4}	3
(Italy) GM Moroni	6	4	1
(Italy) J Sinner	0	6	6

Second round
3	(Italy) S Travaglia	7^{9}	6
(Argentina) A Collarini	6^{7}	3
(Argentina) F Coria	7	6
15	(Germany) M Moraing	5	3
9	(Serbia) N Milojević	5	6	7
ITF	(Egypt) K-M Maamoun	7	1	5
(Italy) J Sinner	5	3
7	(Italy) A Arnaboldi	7	6

Third round
3	(Italy) S Travaglia	6	4	3
(Argentina) F Coria	3	6	6
9	(Serbia) N Milojević	7^{7}	1
7	(Italy) A Arnaboldi	6^{3}	0^{r}

Quarterfinals
(Argentina) F Coria	6^{4}	1
9	(Serbia) N Milojević	7^{7}	6

=== Bottom half ===
==== Section 3 ====
First round
WC	(Italy) L Musetti	6	6
(Portugal) G Elias	3	4
(Bosnia and Herzegovina) T Brkić	1	2
(Germany) D Masur	6	6
WC	(Italy) J Ocleppo	6	6
(Bosnia and Herzegovina) A Šetkić	1	3
Q	(India) S Nagal	1	6	6
ITF	(Germany) Peter Heller	6	1	0

Second round
LL	(Italy) M Arnaldi	2	0
WC	(Italy) L Musetti	6	6
(Germany) D Masur	7^{7}	4	3
12	(Slovakia) F Horanský	6^{4}	6	6
14	(Croatia) V Galović	6	7
WC	(Italy) J Ocleppo	3	5
Q	(India) S Nagal	3	4
4	(Italy) F Baldi	6	6

Third round
WC	(Italy) L Musetti	6	1	2
12	(Slovakia) F Horanský	1	6	6
14	(Croatia) V Galović	6	6
4	(Italy) F Baldi	4	2

Quarterfinals
12	(Slovakia) F Horanský	4	6^{3}
14	(Croatia) V Galović	6	7^{7}

==== Section 4 ====
First round
(Russia) P Kotov	4	6	7^{7}
(Belgium) S Darcis	6	2	6^{3}
WC	(Italy) Giuseppe Tresca	0	1
WC	(Italy) G Zeppieri	6	6
(Lithuania) L Grigelis	1	6	7
(Czech Republic) Z Kolář	6	3	5
LL	(Italy) M Bortolotti	3	7	2
ITF	(Spain) J Barranco Cosano	6	5	6

Second round
8	(Italy) G Mager	6	6
(Russia) P Kotov	2	4
WC	(Italy) G Zeppieri	4	6	4
10	(Australia) T Kokkinakis	6	4	6
13	(Italy) S Napolitano	w/o
(Lithuania) L Grigelis
ITF	(Spain) J Barranco Cosano	6	3	4
2	(Germany) O Otte	4	6	6

Third round
8	(Italy) G Mager	w/o
10	(Australia) T Kokkinakis
13	(Italy) S Napolitano	6	6
2	(Germany) O Otte	3	1

Quarterfinals
8	(Italy) G Mager	7^{7}	6
13	(Italy) S Napolitano	6^{4}	3
