= 2024 Mubadala Citi DC Open – Men's doubles =

Men's doubles
- 2024 Mubadala Citi DC Open

Final
- Champions: (United States) Nathaniel Lammons (United States) Jackson Withrow
- Runners-up: (Brazil) Rafael Matos (Brazil) Marcelo Melo
- Score: 7–5, 6–3

Details
- Draw: 16
- Seeds: 4

Events
Singles	men	women
Doubles	men	women
- Washington Open

Nathaniel Lammons and Jackson Withrow defeated Rafael Matos and Marcelo Melo in the final, 7–5, 6–3 to win the men's doubles tennis title at the 2024 Washington Open. It was Lammons and Withrow's second title in two weeks.

Máximo González and Andrés Molteni were the reigning champions, but chose to compete in the Olympic Games instead.

== Seeds ==
1. (Finland) Harri Heliövaara / (United Kingdom) Henry Patten (quarterfinals)
2. (Australia) Max Purcell / (Australia) Jordan Thompson (semifinals, withdrew)
3. (United Kingdom) Jamie Murray / (New Zealand) Michael Venus (first round)
4. (United States) Nathaniel Lammons / (United States) Jackson Withrow (champions)
5. (United Kingdom) Lloyd Glasspool / (Mexico) Santiago González (quarterfinals)
6. (France) Sadio Doumbia / (Monaco) Hugo Nys (semifinals)
7. (United Kingdom) Julian Cash / (United States) Robert Galloway (first round)
8. (Brazil) Rafael Matos / (Brazil) Marcelo Melo (final)

== Draw ==
Key

- Q = Qualifier
- WC = Wild card
- LL = Lucky loser
- Alt = Alternate
- ITF = ITF entry
- PR = Protected ranking
- SR = Special ranking
- SE = Special exempt
- JE = Junior exempt
- JR = Junior Accelerator Programme entrant
- CO = College Accelerator Programme entrant
- NG = Next Gen Accelerator Program entrant
- w/o = Walkover
- r = Retired
- d = Defaulted

=== Draw ===
First round
1	(Finland) H Heliövaara (United Kingdom) H Patten	6	7
(Croatia) I Dodig (United States) B Shelton	3	5
(India) Y Bhambri (France) A Olivetti	6^{4}	4
6	(France) S Doumbia (Monaco) H Nys	7^{7}	6
3	(United Kingdom) J Murray (New Zealand) M Venus	4	4
K Khachanov (France) G Mpetshi Perricard	6	6
(Colombia) N Barrientos (Uruguay) A Behar	6^{7}	3
8	(Brazil) R Matos (Brazil) M Melo	7^{9}	6
5	(United Kingdom) L Glasspool (Mexico) S González	6	6
LL	(United States) E King (United States) V Kirkov	3	4
(Austria) A Erler (France) A Rinderknech	5	6	[7]
4	(United States) N Lammons (United States) J Withrow	7	2	[10]
7	(United Kingdom) J Cash (United States) R Galloway	4	2
WC	(United States) S Korda (United States) A Michelsen	6	6
Q	(Ecuador) D Hidalgo (Australia) J-P Smith	2	3
2	(Australia) M Purcell (Australia) J Thompson	6	6

Quarterfinals
1	(Finland) H Heliövaara (United Kingdom) H Patten	2	5
6	(France) S Doumbia (Monaco) H Nys	6	7
K Khachanov (France) G Mpetshi Perricard	4	6^{3}
8	(Brazil) R Matos (Brazil) M Melo	6	7^{7}
5	(United Kingdom) L Glasspool (Mexico) S González	4	6^{6}
4	(United States) N Lammons (United States) J Withrow	6	7^{8}
WC	(United States) S Korda (United States) A Michelsen	4	5
2	(Australia) M Purcell (Australia) J Thompson	6	7

Semifinals
6	(France) S Doumbia (Monaco) H Nys	6^{1}	4
8	(Brazil) R Matos (Brazil) M Melo	7^{7}	6
4	(United States) N Lammons (United States) J Withrow	w/o
2	(Australia) M Purcell (Australia) J Thompson

Final
8	(Brazil) R Matos (Brazil) M Melo	5	3
4	(United States) N Lammons (United States) J Withrow	7	6

== Qualifying ==
=== Seeds ===
1. (Ecuador) Diego Hidalgo / (Australia) John-Patrick Smith (qualified)
2. (United States) Evan King / (United States) Vasil Kirkov (qualifying competition, lucky losers)

=== Qualifiers ===
1. (Ecuador) Diego Hidalgo / (Australia) John-Patrick Smith

=== Lucky losers ===
1. (United States) Evan King / (United States) Vasil Kirkov

=== Qualifying draw ===
First round
1	(Ecuador) Diego Hidalgo (Australia) John-Patrick Smith	6	7^{7}
WC	(United States) Robert Cash (United States) James Tracy	4	6^{4}
(United States) Christian Harrison (United States) Mackenzie McDonald	6^{2}	4
2	(United States) Evan King (United States) Vasil Kirkov	7^{7}	6

Qualifying competition
1	(Ecuador) Diego Hidalgo (Australia) John-Patrick Smith	7^{7}	7
2	(United States) Evan King (United States) Vasil Kirkov	6^{5}	5
