= 2021 Open Città della Disfida – Doubles =

Doubles
- 2021 Open Città della Disfida

Final
- Champions: (Italy) Marco Bortolotti (Colombia) Cristian Rodríguez
- Runners-up: (Netherlands) Gijs Brouwer (Netherlands) Jelle Sels
- Score: 6–2, 6–4

Events
Singles	Doubles
- Open Città della Disfida

Denys Molchanov and Igor Zelenay were the defending champions but chose not to defend their title.

Marco Bortolotti and Cristian Rodríguez won the title after defeating Gijs Brouwer and Jelle Sels 6–2, 6–4 in the final.

== Seeds ==
1. (Venezuela) Luis David Martínez / (Italy) Andrea Vavassori (semifinals)
2. (France) Sadio Doumbia / (France) Fabien Reboul (quarterfinals)
3. (Colombia) Nicolás Barrientos / (Italy) Julian Ocleppo (quarterfinals)
4. (United States) James Cerretani / (United States) Junior Alexander Ore (first round)

== Draw ==
Key

- Q = Qualifier
- WC = Wild card
- LL = Lucky loser
- Alt = Alternate
- ITF = ITF entry
- PR = Protected ranking
- SR = Special ranking
- SE = Special exempt
- JE = Junior exempt
- JR = Junior Accelerator Programme entrant
- CO = College Accelerator Programme entrant
- NG = Next Gen Accelerator Program entrant
- w/o = Walkover
- r = Retired
- d = Defaulted

First round
1	(Venezuela) LD Martínez (Italy) A Vavassori	7	6
(Peru) A Merino (Brazil) P Sakamoto	5	2
PR	(Tunisia) M Jaziri (Italy) A Motti	4	7	[10]
WC	(Ukraine) O Ovcharenko (Italy) Giuseppe Tresca	6	5	[7]
4	(United States) J Cerretani (United States) JA Ore	6	6^{3}	[7]
(Russia) Yan Bondarevskiy (Russia) P Kotov	3	7^{7}	[10]
(Peru) N Álvarez (Tunisia) A Dougaz	5	3
(Netherlands) G Brouwer (Netherlands) J Sels	7	6
WC	(Italy) Luca Scelzi (Italy) Antonio Verno	0	1
(Italy) J Berrettini (Italy) G Zeppieri	6	6
(Netherlands) M Hermans (Netherlands) B Stevens	3	4
3	(Colombia) N Barrientos (Italy) J Ocleppo	6	6
(Italy) M Bortolotti (Colombia) C Rodríguez	6	6
WC	(Italy) F Cobolli (Italy) L Nardi	1	3
(Colombia) N Mejía (Ecuador) R Quiroz	4	3
2	(France) S Doumbia (France) F Reboul	6	6

Quarterfinals
1	(Venezuela) LD Martínez (Italy) A Vavassori	6	6
PR	(Tunisia) M Jaziri (Italy) A Motti	3	2
(Russia) Y Bondarevskiy (Russia) P Kotov	3	4
(Netherlands) G Brouwer (Netherlands) J Sels	6	6
(Italy) J Berrettini (Italy) G Zeppieri	4	6	[10]
3	(Colombia) N Barrientos (Italy) J Ocleppo	6	3	[8]
(Italy) M Bortolotti (Colombia) C Rodríguez	6^{8}	6	[16]
2	(France) S Doumbia (France) F Reboul	7^{10}	3	[14]

Semifinals
1	(Venezuela) LD Martínez (Italy) A Vavassori	6^{7}	2
(Netherlands) G Brouwer (Netherlands) J Sels	7^{9}	6
(Italy) J Berrettini (Italy) G Zeppieri	6	0	[7]
(Italy) M Bortolotti (Colombia) C Rodríguez	4	6	[10]

Final
(Netherlands) G Brouwer (Netherlands) J Sels	2	4
(Italy) M Bortolotti (Colombia) C Rodríguez	6	6
