= 2021 Open Città della Disfida – Singles =

Singles
- 2021 Open Città della Disfida

Final
- Champion: (Italy) Giulio Zeppieri
- Runner-up: (Italy) Flavio Cobolli
- Score: 6–1, 3–6, 6–3

Events
Singles	Doubles
← 2019 ·	Open Città della Disfida	· 2022 →

Gianluca Mager was the defending champion but chose not to defend his title.

Giulio Zeppieri won the title after defeating Flavio Cobolli 6–1, 3–6, 6–3 in the final.

== Seeds ==
1. (Slovakia) Andrej Martin (second round)
2. (Argentina) Juan Manuel Cerúndolo (first round, retired)
3. (United Kingdom) Jay Clarke (first round)
4. (Netherlands) Tim van Rijthoven (second round)
5. (Italy) Matteo Viola (first round)
6. (United Kingdom) Jack Draper (first round)
7. (Italy) Riccardo Bonadio (first round)
8. (Chinese Taipei) Tseng Chun-hsin (semifinals)

== Draw ==
=== Key ===
- Q = Qualifier
- WC = Wild card
- LL = Lucky loser
- Alt = Alternate
- SE = Special exempt
- PR = Protected ranking
- ITF = ITF entry
- JE = Junior exempt
- w/o = Walkover
- r = Retired
- d = Defaulted
- SR = Special ranking

=== Finals ===
Semifinals
(Argentina) Thiago Agustín Tirante	1	6	5
(Italy) Flavio Cobolli	6	1	7
8	(Chinese Taipei) Tseng Chun-hsin	6	2	3
(Italy) Giulio Zeppieri	3	6	6

Final
(Italy) Flavio Cobolli	1	6	3
(Italy) Giulio Zeppieri	6	3	6

=== Top half ===
First round
1	(Slovakia) A Martin	4	6	6
WC	(Italy) J Berrettini	6	2	1
(Argentina) TA Tirante	6	4	6
(Cyprus) P Chrysochos	1	6	2
Alt	(Italy) F Forti	2	2
(Ecuador) R Quiroz	6	6
Q	(Peru) N Álvarez	4	7^{7}	7
7	(Italy) R Bonadio	6	6^{5}	5
4	(Netherlands) T van Rijthoven	7	6
WC	(Italy) Emiliano Maggioli	5	4
(Russia) P Kotov	2	6	2
(Italy) F Cobolli	6	4	6
PR	(Germany) Jeremy Jahn	1^{r}
(Serbia) P Krstin	5
(Tunisia) A Dougaz	6	6
6	(United Kingdom) J Draper	3	2

Second round
1	(Slovakia) A Martin	6^{3}	2
(Argentina) TA Tirante	7^{7}	6
(Ecuador) R Quiroz	5	4
Q	(Peru) N Álvarez	7	6
4	(Netherlands) T van Rijthoven	1	2
(Italy) F Cobolli	6	6
(Serbia) P Krstin	2	2
(Tunisia) A Dougaz	6	6

Quarterfinals
(Argentina) TA Tirante	6	6
Q	(Peru) N Álvarez	2	2
(Italy) F Cobolli	6	6
(Tunisia) A Dougaz	3	3

Semifinals
(Argentina) TA Tirante	1	6	5
(Italy) F Cobolli	6	1	7

=== Bottom half ===
First round
8	(Chinese Taipei) C-h Tseng	6	0
Q	(United States) R Harrison	1	0^{r}
WC	(Italy) L Nardi	6	6
(Tunisia) M Jaziri	3	1
(Brazil) P Sakamoto	6^{4}	6^{3}
(Colombia) N Mejía	7^{7}	7^{7}
Q	(Italy) A Vavassori	6	6
3	(United Kingdom) J Clarke	3	4
5	(Italy) M Viola	2	5
Q	(Colombia) C Rodríguez	6	7
(Italy) J Ocleppo	6	6
(Netherlands) J Sels	4	3
(Italy) G Zeppieri	7	6
(Kazakhstan) T Skatov	5	0
(Italy) A Arnaboldi	6	2	5
2	(Argentina) JM Cerúndolo	1	6	2^{r}

Second round
8	(Chinese Taipei) C-h Tseng	5	6	6
WC	(Italy) L Nardi	7	2	4
(Colombia) N Mejía	3	6^{4}
Q	(Italy) A Vavassori	6	7^{7}
Q	(Colombia) C Rodríguez	4	4
(Italy) J Ocleppo	6	6
(Italy) G Zeppieri	6	6
(Italy) A Arnaboldi	3	2

Quarterfinals
8	(Chinese Taipei) C-h Tseng	6	6
Q	(Italy) A Vavassori	4	4
(Italy) J Ocleppo	7	3	2
(Italy) G Zeppieri	5	6	6

Semifinals
8	(Chinese Taipei) C-h Tseng	6	2	3
(Italy) G Zeppieri	3	6	6
