= 2024 Mubadala Citi DC Open – Women's doubles =

Women's doubles
- 2024 Mubadala Citi DC Open

Final
- Champions: (United States) Asia Muhammad (United States) Taylor Townsend
- Runners-up: (China) Jiang Xinyu (Chinese Taipei) Wu Fang-hsien
- Score: 7–6^{(7–0)}, 6–3

Details
- Draw: 16
- Seeds: 4

Events
Singles	men	women
Doubles	men	women
- Washington Open

Asia Muhammad and Taylor Townsend defeated Jiang Xinyu and Wu Fang-hsien in the final, 7–6^{(7–0)}, 6–3 to win the women's doubles tennis title at the 2024 Washington Open. Muhammad and Townsend played only two matches to win the title, as their quarterfinal and semifinal opponents both withdrew.

First-seeded pairing Laura Siegemund and Vera Zvonareva were the reigning champions, but Zvonareva chose not to participate and Siegemund chose to compete in the Olympic Games instead.

== Seeds ==
1. (United States) Asia Muhammad / (United States) Taylor Townsend (champions)
2. (Mexico) Giuliana Olmos / Alexandra Panova (first round)
3. (Norway) Ulrikke Eikeri / (Estonia) Ingrid Neel (semifinals, withdrew)
4. (Japan) Miyu Kato / (Indonesia) Aldila Sutjiadi (semifinals)

== Draw ==
Key

- Q = Qualifier
- WC = Wild card
- LL = Lucky loser
- Alt = Alternate
- ITF = ITF entry
- PR = Protected ranking
- SR = Special ranking
- SE = Special exempt
- JE = Junior exempt
- JR = Junior Accelerator Programme entrant
- CO = College Accelerator Programme entrant
- NG = Next Gen Accelerator Program entrant
- w/o = Walkover
- r = Retired
- d = Defaulted

=== Draw ===
First round
1	(United States) A Muhammad (United States) T Townsend	6	4	[10]
(United States) H Baptiste (United States) P Stearns	0	6	[4]
L Samsonova (China) Y Wang	7^{7}	2	[10]
(United Kingdom) M Lumsden (Czech Republic) A Sisková	6^{4}	6	[8]
3	(Norway) U Eikeri (Estonia) I Neel	6	6
(Georgia (country)) O Kalashnikova; K Rakhimova	2	3
(Japan) E Hozumi (Japan) M Ninomiya	6^{3}	2
(Spain) P Badosa (Tunisia) O Jabeur	7^{7}	6
WC	(Canada) E Bouchard (United States) S Stephens	3	4
(United States) A Krueger (China) Y Xu	6	6
(Slovakia) T Mihalíková (United Kingdom) O Nicholls	2	6	[8]
4	(Japan) M Kato (Indonesia) A Sutjiadi	6	4	[10]
A Potapova; Y Sizikova	3	7^{7}	[10]
WC	(United States) R Montgomery (United States) C Ngounoue	6	6^{5}	[4]
(China) X Jiang (Chinese Taipei) F-h Wu	6	6
2	(Mexico) G Olmos; A Panova	2	2

Quarterfinals
1	(United States) A Muhammad (United States) T Townsend	w/o
L Samsonova (China) Y Wang
3	(Norway) U Eikeri (Estonia) I Neel	w/o
(Spain) P Badosa (Tunisia) O Jabeur
(United States) A Krueger (China) Y Xu	6^{5}	1
4	(Japan) M Kato (Indonesia) A Sutjiadi	7^{7}	6
A Potapova; Y Sizikova	4	6^{5}
(China) X Jiang (Chinese Taipei) F-h Wu	6	7^{7}

Semifinals
1	(United States) A Muhammad (United States) T Townsend	w/o
3	(Norway) U Eikeri (Estonia) I Neel
4	(Japan) M Kato (Indonesia) A Sutjiadi	4	6^{5}
(China) X Jiang (Chinese Taipei) F-h Wu	6	7^{7}

Final
1	(United States) A Muhammad (United States) T Townsend	7^{7}	6
(China) X Jiang (Chinese Taipei) F-h Wu	6^{0}	3
