= 2019 Open Città della Disfida =

Tennis tournament in Italy

- Date: 8–14 April
- Edition: 20th
- Surface: Clay
- Location: Barletta, Italy

Champions

Singles
- (Italy) Gianluca Mager

Doubles
- (Ukraine) Denys Molchanov / (Slovakia) Igor Zelenay
- Open Città della Disfida

The 2019 Open Città della Disfida was a professional tennis tournament played on clay courts. It was the 20th edition of the tournament which was part of the 2019 ATP Challenger Tour. It took place in Barletta, Italy between 8 and 14 April 2019.

== Singles main-draw entrants ==
=== Seeds ===
Country	Player	Rank^{1}	Seed
ITA	Gianluigi Quinzi	144	1
GER	Oscar Otte	148	2
ITA	Stefano Travaglia	154	3
ITA	Filippo Baldi	156	4
~~ITA~~	~~Alessandro Giannessi~~	~~157~~	~~5~~
ITA	Lorenzo Giustino	167	6
ITA	Andrea Arnaboldi	173	7
ITA	Gianluca Mager	179	8
SRB	Nikola Milojević	181	9
AUS	Thanasi Kokkinakis	185	10
AUT	Jurij Rodionov	191	11
SVK	Filip Horanský	192	12
ITA	Stefano Napolitano	193	13
CRO	Viktor Galović	201	14
GER	Mats Moraing	202	15
EGY	Mohamed Safwat	204	16

- ^{1} Rankings are as of 1 April 2019.

=== Other entrants ===
The following players received wildcards into the singles main draw:

- (Italy) Jacopo Berrettini
- (Italy) Lorenzo Musetti
- (Italy) Julian Ocleppo
- (Italy) Giuseppe Tresca
- (Italy) Giulio Zeppieri

The following players received entry into the singles main draw using their ITF World Tennis Ranking:

- (Spain) Javier Barranco Cosano
- (Germany) Peter Heller
- (Egypt) Karim-Mohamed Maamoun
- (Tunisia) Skander Mansouri
- (Kazakhstan) Denis Yevseyev

The following players received entry from the qualifying draw:

- (Germany) Johannes Härteis
- (India) Sumit Nagal

The following players received entry as lucky losers:

- (Italy) Matteo Arnaldi
- (Italy) Marco Bortolotti

== Champions ==
=== Singles ===
- (Italy) Gianluca Mager def. (Serbia) Nikola Milojević 7–6^{(9–7)}, 5–7, 3–2 ret.

=== Doubles ===
- (Ukraine) Denys Molchanov / (Slovakia) Igor Zelenay def. (Bosnia and Herzegovina) Tomislav Brkić / (Croatia) Tomislav Draganja 7–6^{(7–1)}, 6–4.
