= Flavio Cobolli =

Italian tennis player (born 2002)

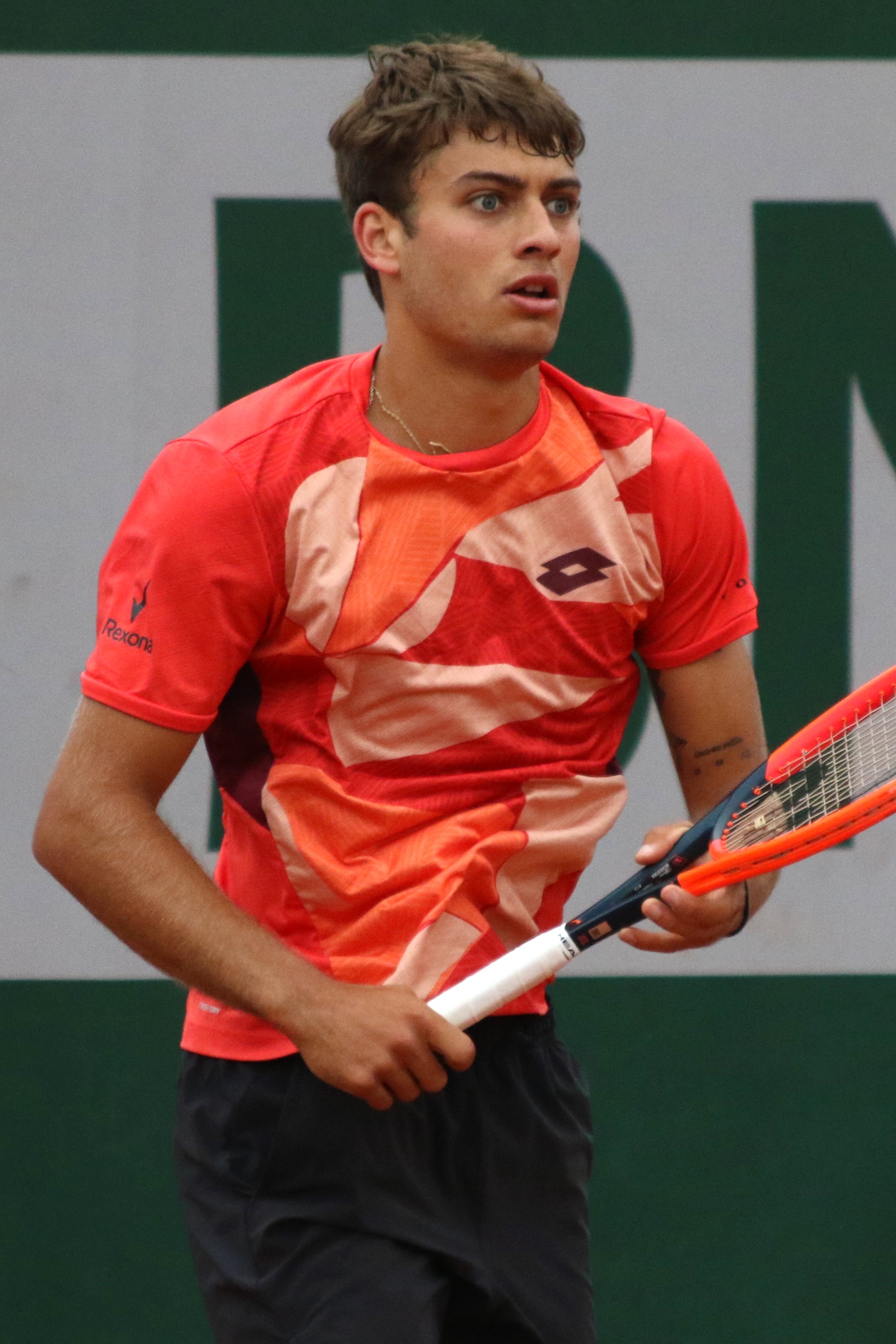
- Cobolli at the 2023 French Open
- Full name: Flavio Cobolli
- Country (sports): Italy
- Residence: Rome, Italy
- Born: 6 May 2002 (age 24) Florence, Italy
- Height: 1.83 m (6 ft 0 in)
- Turned pro: 2020
- Plays: Right-handed (two-handed backhand)
- Coach: Stefano Cobolli
- Prize money: US $9,472,194

Singles
- Career record: 108–84
- Career titles: 3
- Highest ranking: No. 6 (24 August 2026)
- Current ranking: No. 6 (9 November 2026)

Grand Slam singles results
- Australian Open: 3R (2024)
- French Open: F (2026)
- Wimbledon: QF (2025, 2026)
- US Open: 3R (2024, 2025, 2026)

Other tournaments
- Tour Finals: RR (2026)

Doubles
- Career record: 9–24
- Career titles: 0
- Highest ranking: No. 185 (28 July 2025)
- Current ranking: No. 365 (31 August 2026)

Grand Slam doubles results
- Australian Open: 1R (2025)
- French Open: 1R (2024)
- Wimbledon: 1R (2024, 2025)
- US Open: 2R (2024)

Mixed doubles
- Career titles: 1

Grand Slam mixed doubles results
- US Open: F (2026)

Team competitions
- Davis Cup: W (2025)
- Hopman Cup: F (2025)
- Last updated on: 5 September 2026.

Flavio Cobolli (born 6 May 2002) is an Italian professional tennis player. He has a career-high ranking of world No. 6 in men's singles by the Association of Tennis Professionals (ATP), achieved in August 2026, and a best doubles ranking of No. 185, achieved in July 2025. Cobolli has won three ATP Tour singles titles and was the runner-up at the 2026 French Open. He led Italy to the 2025 Davis Cup crown. He is currently the No. 2 Italian singles player.

== Early life ==
Cobolli was born in Florence, Italy to parents Stefano Cobolli, a former tennis player, and Francesca Neri. He grew up in Subiaco in the Metropolitan City of Rome Capital. He started taking tennis lessons in his early childhood. He has a brother, Guglielmo.

== Junior career ==
He won the boys' doubles title at the 2020 French Open, with Dominic Stricker.

Cobolli had good results on the ITF junior circuit, maintaining a 90–50 singles win-loss record.and reached an ITF junior combined ranking of world No. 8 on 27 January 2020.

== Professional career ==
=== 2021: ATP debut and first win, two Challenger finals ===
Cobolli reached his maiden Challenger final at the 2021 Garden Open II in Rome, Italy where he lost to Juan Manuel Cerúndolo.

He won his first ATP match on his debut at the 2021 Emilia-Romagna Open in Parma as a wildcard defeating Marcos Giron. As a result, he reached a new career-high of World No. 386 on 31 May 2021.

In August, he reached his second Challenger final in Barletta, Italy where he lost to compatriot Giulio Zeppieri. He was named as alternate at the 2021 Next Generation ATP Finals.

=== 2022: First Challenger title, Masters debut ===
In March, he won his first Challenger title at the 2022 Zadar Open in Croatia. As a result, he reached the top 150 on 4 April 2022 at World No. 147. Cobolli made his Masters main draw debut at the 2022 Rome Masters after receiving a wildcard into the singles and doubles main draws.

=== 2023: Major and top 100 debuts ===
Cobolli qualified for the 2023 BMW Open and then reached his first ATP quarterfinal. Cobolli qualified for the main draw at the Rome Masters after receiving a wildcard into the singles qualifying draw but lost to Arthur Rinderknech in the first round.

The Italian made his Major debut at the 2023 French Open after winning the qualifying rounds. In the first round, he lost to Carlos Alcaraz.

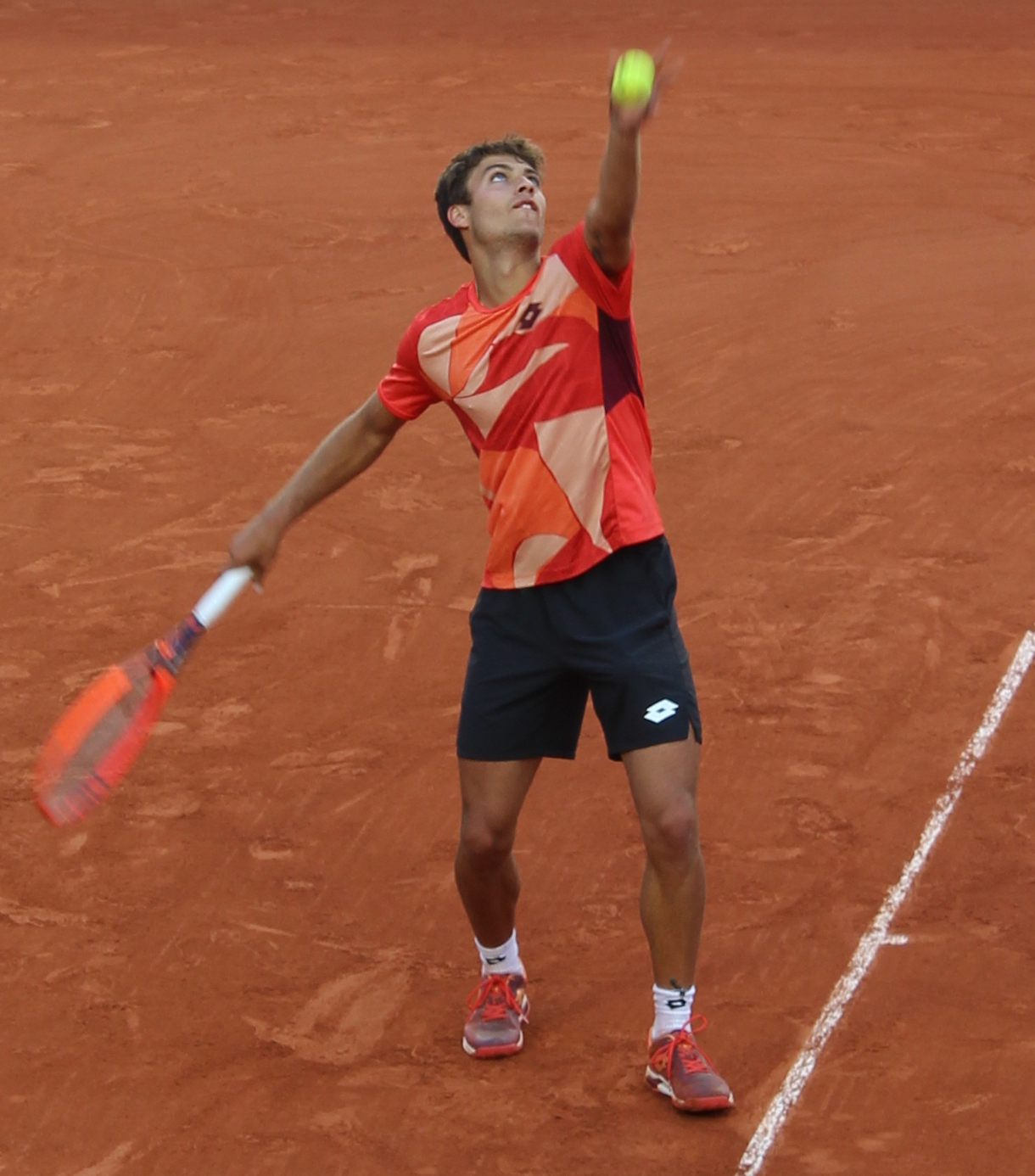
Cobolli at the 2023 French Open

Cobolli won his second Challenger title at the 2023 Lisboa Belém Open defeating Benjamin Hassan in the final. He reached the top 100 after his fifth Challenger final in Olbia at world No. 95 on 23 October 2023. In November, he qualified for the 2023 Next Generation ATP Finals.

=== 2024: First ATP finals, top 30 ===
Cobolli qualified for the main draw to make his debut at the Australian Open. and reached the third round. He lost to Alex de Minaur in the third round, rising to No. 76 after the tournament. Cobolli reached his second and third ATP quarterfinals at Montpellier and Delray Beach in February. He qualified for his first ATP 500 tournament at Acapulco, defeating Félix Auger-Aliassime in the opening round.

At the 2024 Mutua Madrid Open, Cobolli reached the third round of a Masters for the first time and moved into the top 60 of the rankings for the first time on 6 May 2024. At the Geneva Open, he reached his first ATP semifinal.

Cobolli reached his first ATP final in Washington in July. He lost to Sebastian Korda in the final. As a result, he reached a ranking of No. 33 on 5 August 2024. Seeded at a Grand Slam for the first time (No. 31) at the US Open, he reached the third round, where he lost to fifth seed Daniil Medvedev. Following the US Open, Cobolli was chosen for Italy's Davis Cup team in Bologna. He also represented Team Europe at the Laver Cup as first alternate.

Cobolli reached the quarterfinals at Beijing, losing to Medvedev. Seeded 28th at the Shanghai Masters, he defeated Stan Wawrinka and then lost to Novak Djokovic. His season ended after he suffered a shoulder injury in the second round of Vienna against Alex de Minaur. He finished the year ranked No. 32.

=== 2025: ATP titles, Major quarterfinal, top 20, Davis Cup champion ===
In the first round of the Australian Open, he lost to Tomás Etcheverry in four sets, marking his first Grand Slam loss to a player ranked outside the top 20. Cobolli did not win another match until he entered the Phoenix Challenger in March.

Cobolli played at the Țiriac Open in Bucharest as the third seed with a win-loss record of 3–8 for the season. He reached his second ATP Final and first on clay, defeating Sebastián Báez to win the first ATP title of his career. Cobolli reached the third round of Madrid for the second year in a row. He reached his third ATP final and second at ATP 500 level at the Hamburg Open where he defeated Andrey Rublev in straight sets. As a result, he reached a ranking of No. 26 on 26 May 2026.

Seeded 22nd at the Wimbledon, Cobolli reached his first Grand Slam quarterfinal, but lost to Novak Djokovic in four sets. Nonetheless, this result guaranteed him a new career high ranking of world No. 19 on 14 July 2025; two weeks later, he had risen to No. 17.

At Toronto, Cobolli reached the fourth round before losing to Ben Shelton in a tense three-set match where Shelton confronted Cobolli about a gesture made in the final tiebreak. Seeded 24th at the US Open, he retired trailing against Lorenzo Musetti in the third round. In November, he competed at the 2025 Davis Cup Finals. After the withdrawal of Jannik Sinner and Lorenzo Musetti, and he and Matteo Berrettini achieved the third Davis Cup win in a row and winning it against Spain, without losing a match in the entire competition. He ended the year ranked No. 22.

=== 2026: French Open final, Cincinnati semifinal, World No. 6 ===
Cobolli at the 2026 Cincinnati Open

Cobolli then made the semifinals at Delray Beach, where he lost to eventual champion Sebastian Korda. He made it to the final at Acapulco the following week, defeating Frances Tiafoe to win his first hardcourt title, second ATP 500 title, and third ATP title overall. He rose to No. 15 as a result of the win.

Cobolli endured early losses at Miami and Monte-Carlo. At the 2026 BMW Open in Munich he upset world No. 3 and top seed Alexander Zverev in the semifinals, but lost in the final to Ben Shelton. As a result, he reached a ranking of No. 12 on 4 May 2026.

Seeded 10th at the French Open, Cobolli defeated qualifier Andrea Pellegrino, Wu Yibing, and 18th seed Learner Tien to reach the fourth round of a major for the second time. He defeated Zachary Svajda to reach his second major quarterfinal and first at Roland Garros. He defeated Félix Auger-Aliassime in four sets to reach his first major semifinal where he received walkover after his opponent Matteo Arnaldi withdrew because of a virus. In the final, he lost out to Alexander Zverev in 5 sets. As a result of his performance Cobolli made his debut in the top 10 on 8 June 2026.

== Endorsements ==
In May 2024, Cobolli signed a deal with sneaker brand On. He had been sponsored by Lotto Sport Italia before On.

== Personal life ==
Cobolli has stated that his tennis idol is Novak Djokovic.

He is an avid fan of the Italian football club AS Roma.

== Performance timelines ==
Key
W	F	SF	QF	#R	RR	Q#	DNQ	A	NH

(W) winner; (F) finalist; (SF) semifinalist; (QF) quarterfinalist; (#R) rounds 4, 3, 2, 1; (RR) round-robin stage; (Q#) qualification round; (DNQ) did not qualify; (A) absent; (NH) not held; (SR) strike rate (events won / competed); (W–L) win–loss record.
To avoid confusion and double counting, these charts are updated at the conclusion of a tournament or when the player's participation has ended.

=== Singles ===
Current through the 2026 ATP Finals.

Tournament	2020	2021	2022	2023	2024	2025	2026	SR	W–L	Win %
Grand Slam tournaments
Australian Open	A	A	Q3	Q1	3R	1R	1R	0 / 3	2–3	40%
French Open	A	A	Q2	1R	2R	3R	F (Note: Cobolli's opponent, Matteo Arnaldi, withdrew during the tournament before their semifinal match, which does not count as a win.)	0 / 4	8–4	67%
Wimbledon	NH	A	Q1	Q1	2R	QF	QF	0 / 3	9–3	75%
US Open	A	A	Q3	Q1	3R	3R	3R	0 / 3	6–3	67%
Win–loss	0–0	0–0	0–0	0–1	6–4	8–4	11–4	0 / 13	25–13	66%
Year-end championships
ATP Finals	Did not qualify						RR	0 / 1	0–3	0%
National representation
Davis Cup	A		A	A	W	W		2 / 2	4–1	80%
ATP Masters 1000
Indian Wells Open	NH	A	A	A	1R	1R	3R	0 / 3	1–3	25%
Miami Open	NH	A	A	A	2R	1R	2R	0 / 3	1–3	25%
Monte-Carlo Masters	NH	A	Q2	A	Q1	2R	2R	0 / 2	2–2	50%
Madrid Open	NH	A	A	A	3R	3R	QF	0 / 3	7–3	70%
Italian Open	Q1	Q1	1R	1R	2R	1R	3R	0 / 5	2–5	29%
Canadian Open	NH	A	A	A	2R	4R	2R	0 / 3	3–3	50%
Cincinnati Open	A	A	A	A	3R	2R	SF	0 / 3	6–3	67%
Shanghai Masters	NH			A	3R	2R	2R	0 / 3	1–3	25%
Paris Masters	A	A	A	A	A	2R	A	0 / 1	1–1	50%
Win–loss	0–0	0–0	0–1	0–1	8–7	6–9	10–8	0 / 26	24–26	48%
Career statistics
	2020	2021	2022	2023	2024	2025	2026	SR	W–L	Win%
Tournaments	0	1	3	6	26	27	24	Career total: 87		
Titles	0	0	0	0	0	2	1	Career total: 3		
Finals	0	0	0	0	1	2	3	Career total: 6		
Hard win–loss	0–0	0–0	0–2	2–3	22–15	14–19	18–18	1 / 50	56–57	50%
Clay win–loss	0–0	1–1	0–1	3–4	10–8	14–5	14–7	2 / 28	42–26	62%
Grass win–loss	0–0	0–0	0–0	0–0	3–4	6–3	4–2	0 / 9	13–9	59%
Overall win–loss	0–0	1–1	0–3	5–7	35–27	34–27	36–27	3 / 87	111–92	55%
Win %	–	50%	0%	42%	56%	56%	57%	55%		
Year-end ranking	874	205	171	101	32	22		$10,169,553		

== Grand Slam tournaments finals ==
=== Singles: 1 (runner-up) ===
Result	Year	Tournament	Surface	Opponent	Score
Loss	2026	French Open	Clay	(Germany) Alexander Zverev	1–6, 6–4, 4–6, 7–6^{(7–5)}, 1–6

=== Mixed doubles: 1 (runner-up) ===
Result	Year	Tournament	Surface	Partner	Opponents	Score
Loss	2026	US Open	Hard	(Switzerland) Belinda Bencic	(Czech Republic) Karolína Muchová (Czech Republic) Jakub Menšík	3–6, 6–1, [6–10]

== Other significant finals ==
=== ATP 1000 tournaments ===
==== Mixed doubles: 1 (title) ====
Result	Year	Tournament	Surface	Partner	Opponents	Score
Win	2026	Indian Wells Open	Hard	(Switzerland) Belinda Bencic	(Canada) Gabriela Dabrowski (United Kingdom) Lloyd Glasspool	6–3, 2–6, [10–7]

== ATP Tour finals ==
=== Singles: 6 (3 titles, 3 runner-ups) ===
Legend Grand Slam (0–1) ATP 1000 (–) ATP 500 (2–2) ATP 250 (1–0)	Finals by surface Hard (1–1) Clay (2–2) Grass (–)	Finals by setting Outdoor (3–3) Indoor (–)

Result	W–L	Date	Tournament	Tier	Surface	Opponent	Score
Loss	0–1	Jul 2024	Washington Open, US	ATP 500	Hard	(United States) Sebastian Korda	6–4, 2–6, 0–6
Win	1–1	Apr 2025	Țiriac Open, Romania	ATP 250	Clay	(Argentina) Sebastián Báez	6–4, 6–4
Win	2–1	May 2025	Hamburg Open, Germany	ATP 500	Clay	Andrey Rublev	6–2, 6–4
Win	3–1	Feb 2026	Mexican Open, Mexico	ATP 500	Hard	(United States) Frances Tiafoe	7–6^{(7–4)}, 6–4
Loss	3–2	Apr 2026	Bavarian Open, Germany	ATP 500	Clay	(United States) Ben Shelton	2–6, 5–7
Loss	3–3	May 2026	French Open, France	Grand Slam	Clay	(Germany) Alexander Zverev	1–6, 6–4, 4–6, 7–6^{(7–5)}, 1–6

== National and international representation ==
=== National team finals: 2 (1 title, 1 runner-up) ===
Finals by tournaments Davis Cup (1–0) United Cup (–) Hopman Cup (0–1)	Finals by surface Hard (1–1) Clay (–)

Result	Date	W–L	Tournament	Surface	Team	Partner(s)	Opponent team	Opponent players	Score
Loss	Jul 2025	0–1	Hopman Cup, Bari	Hard	Italy	Lucia Bronzetti	Canada	Félix Auger-Aliassime; Bianca Andreescu	1–2
Win	Nov 2025	1–1	Davis Cup, Bologna	Hard (i)	Italy	Lorenzo Sonego; Matteo Berrettini; Andrea Vavassori; Simone Bolelli	Spain	Jaume Munar; Pablo Carreño Busta; Pedro Martínez; Marcel Granollers	2–0

=== Laver Cup: 1 (1 win, 1 runner-up) ===
Result	Date	Location	Surface	Team	Captains	Partners	Opponent team	Opp. captains	Opponents	Score
Loss	Sep 2025	San Francisco, United States	Hard (i)	Team Europe	Yannick Noah; Tim Henman	Carlos Alcaraz; Alexander Zverev; Holger Rune; Casper Ruud; Jakub Menšík	Team World	Andre Agassi; Pat Rafter	Taylor Fritz; Alex de Minaur; Alex Michelsen; Francisco Cerúndolo; Reilly Opelka; João Fonseca	9–15
Win	Sep 2026	London, United Kingdom	Hard (i)	Team Europe	Yannick Noah; Tim Henman	Carlos Alcaraz; Alexander Zverev; Rafael Jódar; Jakub Menšík; Casper Ruud	Team World	Andre Agassi; Pat Rafter	Alex de Minaur; Taylor Fritz; Learner Tien; Brandon Nakashima; Alexander Bublik; Francisco Cerúndolo	13–5

== ATP Challenger Tour Finals ==
=== Singles: 5 (2 titles, 3 runner-ups) ===
Finals by surface
Hard (0–1)
Clay (2–2)

Result	W–L	Date	Tournament	Surface	Opponent	Score
Loss	0–1	Apr 2021	Garden Open II, Italy	Clay	(Argentina) Juan Manuel Cerúndolo	2–6, 6–3, 3–6
Loss	0–2	Aug 2021	Open della Disfida, Italy	Clay	(Italy) Giulio Zeppieri	1–6, 6–3, 3–6
Win	1–2	Mar 2022	Zadar Open, Croatia	Clay	(Poland) Daniel Michalski	6–4, 6–2
Win	2–2	Oct 2023	Lisboa Belém Open, Portugal	Clay	(Lebanon) Benjamin Hassan	7–5, 7–5
Loss	2–3	Oct 2023	Olbia Challenger, Italy	Hard	(France) Kyrian Jacquet	3–6, 4–6

=== Doubles: 2 (1 title, 1 runner-up) ===
Result	W–L	Date	Tournament	Surface	Partner	Opponents	Score
Loss	0–1	Apr 2022	Sanremo Challenger, Italy	Clay	(Italy) Matteo Gigante	(France) Geoffrey Blancaneaux (France) Alexandre Müller	6–4, 3–6, [9–11]
Win	1–1	Apr 2023	Open della Disfida, Italy	Clay	(Italy) Jacopo Berrettini	(Czech Republic) Zdeněk Kolář (Ukraine) Denys Molchanov	1–6, 7–5, [10–6]

== ITF World Tennis Tour Finals ==
=== Singles: 2 (1 title, 1 runner-up) ===
Result	W–L	Date	Tournament	Surface	Opponent	Score
Loss	0–1	Sep 2019	M25 Santa Margherita di Pula, Italy	Clay	(Bosnia and Herzegovina) Nerman Fatić	2–6, 2–6
Win	1–1	Apr 2021	M15 Antalya, Turkey	Clay	(Sweden) Dragoș Nicolae Mădăraș	0–6, 6–3, 6–3

== Junior Grand Slam finals ==
=== Doubles: 2 (1 title, 1 runner-up) ===
Result	Year	Tournament	Surface	Partner	Opponents	Score
Loss	2019	French Open	Clay	(Switzerland) Dominic Stricker	(Brazil) Matheus Pucinelli de Almeida (Argentina) Thiago Agustín Tirante	6–7^{(3–7)}, 4–6
Win	2020	French Open	Clay	(Switzerland) Dominic Stricker	(Brazil) Bruno Oliveira (Brazil) Natan Rodrigues	6–2, 6–4

== Wins over top 10 players ==
- Cobolli has a 5–19 (20.83%) record against players who were, at the time the match was played, ranked in the top 10.

Season	2024	2025	2026	Total
Wins	0	1	4	5

#	Player	Rk	Event	Surface	Rd	Score	Rk	Ref
2025
1.	(Denmark) Holger Rune	9	Madrid Open, Spain	Clay	2R	6–2, ret.	36	
2026
2.	(Germany) Alexander Zverev	3	Bavarian Open, Germany	Clay	SF	6–3, 6–3	16	
3.	Daniil Medvedev	10	Madrid Open, Spain	Clay	4R	6–3, 5–7, 6–4	13	
4.	(Canada) Félix Auger-Aliassime	6	French Open, France	Clay	QF	4–6, 6–4, 6–4, 6–4	14	
5.	(Australia) Alex de Minaur	6	Wimbledon, United Kingdom	Grass	4R	7–5, 7–6^{(7–4)}, 6–3	10	

- Key: (Rk) first use, opponent rank; (Rd) round; (Rk) 2nd use, player rank; (Ref) reference; (F) final; (SF) semifinal; (QF) quarterfinal; (#R) rounds 4, 3, 2, 1; (RR) round-robin stage; (Q#) qualifying rounds or stages (3), 2, 1.

*As of 6 July 2026

== Exhibition matches ==
=== Team competitions ===
Result	Date	Tournament	Surface	Team	Partner(s)	Opp. team	Opponent players	Score
Loss	Dec 2025	World Tennis Continental Cup, Shenzhen, China	Hard (i)	Europe Team	Valentin Vacherot; Iga Świątek; Belinda Bencic	World Team	Andrey Rublev; Zhang Zhizhen; Elena Rybakina; Wang Xinyu	7–15
