= 2020 Wolffkran Open – Doubles =

Doubles
- 2020 Wolffkran Open

Final
- Champions: (Germany) Andre Begemann (Netherlands) David Pel
- Runners-up: (United Kingdom) Lloyd Glasspool (United States) Alex Lawson
- Score: 5–7, 7–6^{(7–2)}, [10–4]

Events
Singles	Doubles
← 2019 ·	Wolffkran Open	· 2021 →

Quentin Halys and Tristan Lamasine were the defending champions but chose not to defend their title.

Andre Begemann and David Pel won the title after defeating Lloyd Glasspool and Alex Lawson 5–7, 7–6^{(7–2)}, [10–4] in the final.

== Seeds ==
1. (Germany) Andre Begemann / (Netherlands) David Pel (champions)
2. (India) Purav Raja / (India) Ramkumar Ramanathan (first round)
3. (United States) James Cerretani / (Austria) Tristan-Samuel Weissborn (semifinals)
4. (India) Sriram Balaji / (Switzerland) Luca Margaroli (first round)

== Draw ==
=== Key ===
- Q = Qualifier
- WC = Wild card
- LL = Lucky loser
- Alt = Alternate
- SE = Special exempt
- PR = Protected ranking
- ITF = ITF entry
- JE = Junior exempt
- w/o = Walkover
- r = Retired
- d = Defaulted
- SR = Special ranking

First round
1	(Germany) A Begemann (Netherlands) D Pel	6	6
(Germany) J Lenz (Germany) Y Maden	3	2
PR	(Germany) D Brown (Canada) B Schnur	3	6	[9]
(Peru) S Galdós (Switzerland) M-A Hüsler	6	2	[11]
3	(United States) J Cerretani (Austria) T-S Weissborn	6	4	[12]
(Poland) K Drzewiecki (Poland) S Walków	2	6	[10]
WC	(Germany) MH Rehberg (Germany) C-M Stebe	4	4
WC	(Germany) J Schnaitter (Germany) Michael Weindl	6	6
(Czech Republic) Z Kolář (France) A Olivetti	6	6^{6}	[10]
(Brazil) F Romboli (Chinese Taipei) T-h Yang	3	7^{8}	[7]
(United States) S Korda (United States) B Nakashima	6	7
4	(India) S Balaji (Switzerland) L Margaroli	4	5
(France) A Hoang (Germany) D Masur	7^{12}	6
WC	(Germany) F Fallert (Germany) J Härteis	6^{10}	1
(United Kingdom) L Glasspool (United States) A Lawson	5	6	[10]
2	(India) P Raja (India) R Ramanathan	7	3	[4]

Quarterfinals
1	(Germany) A Begemann (Netherlands) D Pel	6	6^{5}	[10]
(Peru) S Galdós (Switzerland) M-A Hüsler	2	7^{7}	[3]
3	(United States) J Cerretani (Austria) T-S Weissborn	3	7^{7}	[10]
WC	(Germany) J Schnaitter (Germany) M Weindl	6	6^{2}	[5]
(Czech Republic) Z Kolář (France) A Olivetti	6^{4}	6	[10]
(United States) S Korda (United States) B Nakashima	7^{7}	3	[3]
(France) A Hoang (Germany) D Masur	4	6	[8]
(United Kingdom) L Glasspool (United States) A Lawson	6	3	[10]

Semifinals
1	(Germany) A Begemann (Netherlands) D Pel	7	6
3	(United States) J Cerretani (Austria) T-S Weissborn	5	3
(Czech Republic) Z Kolář (France) A Olivetti	4	7^{10}	[10]
(United Kingdom) L Glasspool (United States) A Lawson	6	6^{8}	[12]

Final
1	(Germany) A Begemann (Netherlands) D Pel	5	7^{7}	[10]
(United Kingdom) L Glasspool (United States) A Lawson	7	6^{2}	[4]
