= 2021 Wolffkran Open =

- Date: 25 – 31 October
- Edition: 5th
- Surface: Carpet, Indoor
- Location: Ismaning, Germany

Champions

Singles
- (Germany) Oscar Otte

Doubles
- (Germany) Andre Begemann / (Slovakia) Igor Zelenay
← 2020 ·	Wolffkran Open	· 2022 →

The 2021 Wolffkran Open was a professional tennis tournament played on carpet courts. It was the fifth edition of the tournament which was part of the 2021 ATP Challenger Tour. It took place in Ismaning, Germany between 25 and 31 October 2021.

== Singles main draw entrants ==
=== Seeds ===
Country	Player	Rank^{1}	Seed
AUS	Jordan Thompson	72	1
CZE	Jiří Veselý	77	2
ITA	Andreas Seppi	98	3
GER	Yannick Hanfmann	127	4
GER	Oscar Otte	131	5
CZE	Tomáš Macháč	140	6
USA	Maxime Cressy	143	7
FRA	Quentin Halys	150	8

- ^{1} Rankings are as of 18 October 2021.

=== Other entrants ===
The following players received wildcards into the singles main draw:

- (Germany) Max Hans Rehberg
- (Germany) Mats Rosenkranz
- (Germany) Henri Squire

The following player received entry into the singles main draw using a protected ranking:

- (Germany) Yannick Maden

The following players received entry into the singles main draw as alternates:

- (Germany) Tobias Kamke
- (Ukraine) Vitaliy Sachko

The following players received entry from the qualifying draw:

- (Germany) Matthias Bachinger
- (Czech Republic) Jonáš Forejtek
- (Germany) Julian Lenz
- (Finland) Otto Virtanen

The following player received entry as a lucky loser:

- (Japan) Hiroki Moriya

== Champions ==
=== Singles ===
- (Germany) Oscar Otte def. (Slovakia) Lukáš Lacko 6–4, 6–4.

=== Doubles ===
- (Germany) Andre Begemann / (Slovakia) Igor Zelenay def. (Czech Republic) Marek Gengel / (Czech Republic) Tomáš Macháč 6–2, 6–4.
