= 2023 Wolffkran Open – Singles =

Singles
- 2023 Wolffkran Open

Final
- Champion: (Switzerland) Antoine Bellier
- Runner-up: (Germany) Maximilian Marterer
- Score: 7–6^{(7–5)}, 6–7^{(5–7)}, 7–6^{(8–6)}

Events
Singles	Doubles
← 2022 ·	Wolffkran Open	· 2024 →

Quentin Halys was the defending champion but chose not to defend his title.

Antoine Bellier won the title after defeating Maximilian Marterer 7–6^{(7–5)}, 6–7^{(5–7)}, 7–6^{(8–6)} in the final.

== Seeds ==
1. (Switzerland) Dominic Stricker (second round, retired)
2. (Germany) Maximilian Marterer (final)
3. (United States) Maxime Cressy (first round)
4. (South Africa) Lloyd Harris (withdrew)
5. (Bosnia and Herzegovina) Damir Džumhur (first round)
6. (United Kingdom) Jan Choinski (first round)
7. (Ukraine) Vitaliy Sachko (first round)
8. (Switzerland) Marc-Andrea Hüsler (quarterfinals)
9. (France) Harold Mayot (first round)

== Draw ==
=== Key ===
- Q = Qualifier
- WC = Wild card
- LL = Lucky loser
- Alt = Alternate
- SE = Special exempt
- PR = Protected ranking
- ITF = ITF entry
- JE = Junior exempt
- w/o = Walkover
- r = Retired
- d = Defaulted
- SR = Special ranking

=== Finals ===
Semifinals
(Germany) Rudolf Molleker	6^{5}	2
Q	(Switzerland) Antoine Bellier	7^{7}	6
(Slovakia) Lukáš Klein	4	4
2	(Germany) Maximilian Marterer	6	6

Final
Q	(Switzerland) Antoine Bellier	7^{7}	6^{5}	7^{8}
2	(Germany) Maximilian Marterer	6^{5}	7^{7}	6^{6}

=== Top half ===
First round
1	(Switzerland) D Stricker	7^{7}	3	6
Q	(Portugal) J Sousa	6^{4}	6	3
(Germany) R Molleker	7^{7}	4	6
WC	(Germany) D Masur	6^{4}	6	3
Alt	(France) M Bourgue	6	6
(Ukraine) O Krutykh	3	0
Alt	A Kachmazov	6	5	6
6	(United Kingdom) J Choinski	4	7	2
9	(France) H Mayot	6^{1}	3
Q	(Switzerland) A Bellier	7^{7}	6
WC	(Germany) M Topo	7^{7}	3	6^{3}
(Germany) O Otte	6^{2}	6	7^{7}
(Kazakhstan) D Yevseyev	3	4
(Germany) H Squire	6	6
(Croatia) M Poljičak	4	1
8	(Switzerland) M-A Hüsler	6	6

Second round
1	(Switzerland) D Stricker	7^{7}	1^{r}
(Germany) R Molleker	6^{2}	4
Alt	(France) M Bourgue	7^{7}	3	3
Alt	A Kachmazov	6^{1}	6	6
Q	(Switzerland) A Bellier	6	7^{7}
(Germany) O Otte	4	6^{3}
(Germany) H Squire	3	7	6^{5}
8	(Switzerland) M-A Hüsler	6	5	7^{7}

Quarterfinals
(Germany) R Molleker	7	6^{7}	6
Alt	A Kachmazov	5	7^{9}	3
Q	(Switzerland) A Bellier	6	6
8	(Switzerland) M-A Hüsler	3	2

Semifinals
(Germany) R Molleker	6^{5}	2
Q	(Switzerland) A Bellier	7^{7}	6

=== Bottom half ===
First round
5	(Bosnia and Herzegovina) D Džumhur	3	6	1
(Slovakia) L Klein	6	3	6
(Bosnia and Herzegovina) N Fatić	7	7
LL	(Romania) M Copil	5	5
(Hungary) M Valkusz	4	6^{13}
Q	(Germany) M Rosenkranz	6	7^{15}
WC	(Germany) MH Rehberg	6^{5}	6	7^{7}
3	(United States) M Cressy	7^{7}	4	6^{4}
7	(Ukraine) V Sachko	6	6^{3}	3
(Germany) Timo Stodder	3	7^{7}	6
Q	(Czech Republic) A Paulson	6	6^{6}	6
Q	(Germany) L Wessels	4	7^{8}	3
(Bulgaria) A Andreev	6^{12}	4
Q	(Poland) K Żuk	7^{14}	6
(Belgium) M Geerts	3	4
2	(Germany) M Marterer	6	6

Second round
(Slovakia) L Klein	6^{0}	6	6
(Bosnia and Herzegovina) N Fatić	7^{7}	4	4
Q	(Germany) M Rosenkranz	6^{5}	4
WC	(Germany) MH Rehberg	7^{7}	6
(Germany) T Stodder	6^{9}	3
Q	(Czech Republic) A Paulson	7^{11}	6
Q	(Poland) K Żuk	3	6^{3}
2	(Germany) M Marterer	6	7^{7}

Quarterfinals
(Slovakia) L Klein	6	6
WC	(Germany) MH Rehberg	3	2
Q	(Czech Republic) A Paulson	2	4
2	(Germany) M Marterer	6	6

Semifinals
(Slovakia) L Klein	4	4
2	(Germany) M Marterer	6	6
