= 2020 Wolffkran Open – Singles =

Singles
- 2020 Wolffkran Open

Final
- Champion: (Switzerland) Marc-Andrea Hüsler
- Runner-up: (Netherlands) Botic van de Zandschulp
- Score: 6–7^{(3–7)}, 7–6^{(7–2)}, 7–5

Events
Singles	Doubles
← 2019 ·	Wolffkran Open	· 2021 →

Lukáš Lacko was the defending champion but lost in the second round to Prajnesh Gunneswaran.

Marc-Andrea Hüsler won the title after defeating Botic van de Zandschulp 6–7^{(3–7)}, 7–6^{(7–2)}, 7–5 in the final.

== Seeds ==
1. (Argentina) Federico Delbonis (first round)
2. (Germany) Yannick Hanfmann (second round)
3. (France) Grégoire Barrère (first round)
4. (France) Antoine Hoang (semifinals)
5. (United States) Sebastian Korda (quarterfinals)
6. (Switzerland) Henri Laaksonen (second round)
7. (India) Prajnesh Gunneswaran (semifinals)
8. (Peru) Juan Pablo Varillas (first round)

== Draw ==
=== Key ===
- Q = Qualifier
- WC = Wild card
- LL = Lucky loser
- Alt = Alternate
- SE = Special exempt
- PR = Protected ranking
- ITF = ITF entry
- JE = Junior exempt
- w/o = Walkover
- r = Retired
- d = Defaulted
- SR = Special ranking

=== Finals ===
Semifinals
(Switzerland) Marc-Andrea Hüsler	6	7^{7}
4	(France) Antoine Hoang	4	6^{4}
7	(India) Prajnesh Gunneswaran	6^{6}	1
(Netherlands) Botic van de Zandschulp	7^{8}	6

Final
(Switzerland) Marc-Andrea Hüsler	6^{3}	7^{7}	7
(Netherlands) Botic van de Zandschulp	7^{7}	6^{2}	5

=== Top half ===
First round
1	(Argentina) F Delbonis	4	7^{7}	3
(Canada) B Schnur	6	6^{2}	6
(Switzerland) M-A Hüsler	7^{7}	4	7^{7}
PR	(Germany) D Brown	6^{3}	6	6^{5}
Q	(Germany) J Lenz	5	7	6
(Argentina) JP Ficovich	7	5	4
(Czech Republic) Z Kolář	6	3	4
5	(United States) S Korda	3	6	6
4	(France) A Hoang	4	7	6
(Serbia) V Troicki	6	5	1
(United States) B Nakashima	6	3	4
(Italy) M Viola	4	6	6
WC	(Germany) M Marterer	7	6
(Denmark) M Torpegaard	5	3
Q	(Austria) L Miedler	4	5
6	(Switzerland) H Laaksonen	6	7

Second round
(Canada) B Schnur	5	6	3
(Switzerland) M-A Hüsler	7	3	6
Q	(Germany) J Lenz	6^{4}	3
5	(United States) S Korda	7^{7}	6
4	(France) A Hoang	6	3	6
(Italy) M Viola	2	6	3
WC	(Germany) M Marterer	7^{8}	6
6	(Switzerland) H Laaksonen	6^{6}	2

Quarterfinals
(Switzerland) M-A Hüsler	6	6
5	(United States) S Korda	4	4
4	(France) A Hoang	5	6	6
WC	(Germany) M Marterer	7	4	4

Semifinals
(Switzerland) M-A Hüsler	6	7^{7}
4	(France) A Hoang	4	6^{4}

=== Bottom half ===
First round
7	(India) P Gunneswaran	6	3	7^{7}
Q	(Argentina) TM Etcheverry	4	6	6^{3}
(Slovakia) L Lacko	5	7^{7}	6
WC	(Germany) MH Rehberg	7	6^{4}	1
WC	(Germany) M Rosenkranz	7	7^{7}
(United States) M Cressy	5	6^{3}
Q	(Germany) D Masur	6	6
3	(France) G Barrère	3	2
8	(Peru) JP Varillas	0	1
(Netherlands) B van de Zandschulp	6	6
(India) R Ramanathan	7^{7}	6
(France) Q Halys	6^{5}	3
(France) C Lestienne	4	2
(Germany) T Kamke	6	6
(Germany) Y Maden	4	6	5
2	(Germany) Y Hanfmann	6	3	7

Second round
7	(India) P Gunneswaran	6	5	6
(Slovakia) L Lacko	4	7	4
WC	(Germany) M Rosenkranz	4	3
Q	(Germany) D Masur	6	6
(Netherlands) B van de Zandschulp	6	6
(India) R Ramanathan	2	2
(Germany) T Kamke	6	6
2	(Germany) Y Hanfmann	1	4

Quarterfinals
7	(India) P Gunneswaran	7	6^{9}	6
Q	(Germany) D Masur	5	7^{11}	3
(Netherlands) B van de Zandschulp	6	3	7^{11}
(Germany) T Kamke	3	6	6^{9}

Semifinals
7	(India) P Gunneswaran	6^{6}	1
(Netherlands) B van de Zandschulp	7^{8}	6
