= 2021 Wolffkran Open – Singles =

Singles
- 2021 Wolffkran Open

Final
- Champion: (Germany) Oscar Otte
- Runner-up: (Slovakia) Lukáš Lacko
- Score: 6–4, 6–4

Events
Singles	Doubles
← 2020 ·	Wolffkran Open	· 2022 →

Marc-Andrea Hüsler was the defending champion but lost in the first round to Mats Rosenkranz.

Oscar Otte won the title after defeating Lukáš Lacko 6–4, 6–4 in the final.

== Seeds ==
1. (Australia) Jordan Thompson (first round)
2. (Czech Republic) Jiří Veselý (first round)
3. (Italy) Andreas Seppi (second round)
4. (Germany) Yannick Hanfmann (first round)
5. (Germany) Oscar Otte (champion)
6. (Czech Republic) Tomáš Macháč (second round)
7. (United States) Maxime Cressy (semifinals)
8. (France) Quentin Halys (semifinals)

== Draw ==
=== Key ===
- Q = Qualifier
- WC = Wild card
- LL = Lucky loser
- Alt = Alternate
- SE = Special exempt
- PR = Protected ranking
- ITF = ITF entry
- JE = Junior exempt
- w/o = Walkover
- r = Retired
- d = Defaulted
- SR = Special ranking

=== Finals ===
Semifinals
8	(France) Quentin Halys	1	6^{5}
(Slovakia) Lukáš Lacko	6	7^{7}
7	(United States) Maxime Cressy	5	6	6^{5}
5	(Germany) Oscar Otte	7	2	7^{7}

Final
(Slovakia) Lukáš Lacko	4	4
5	(Germany) Oscar Otte	6	6

=== Top half ===
First round
1	(Australia) J Thompson	7	2	2
Q	(Czech Republic) J Forejtek	5	6	6
(Germany) M Moraing
PR	(Germany) Y Maden	w/o
WC	(Germany) H Squire	3	4
(Belgium) R Bemelmans	6	6
(Germany) D Masur	4	7	3
8	(France) Q Halys	6	5	6
4	(Germany) Y Hanfmann	7	6^{4}	4
(Netherlands) T van Rijthoven	5	7^{7}	6
(Turkey) A Çelikbilek	3	1
Q	(Germany) M Bachinger	6	6
(Romania) M Copil	6^{8}	6^{4}
(Slovakia) L Lacko	7^{10}	7^{7}
(Belgium) K Coppejans	4	2
6	(Czech Republic) T Macháč	6	6

Second round
Q	(Czech Republic) J Forejtek	7^{7}	3	6
PR	(Germany) Y Maden	6^{3}	6	1
(Belgium) R Bemelmans	6^{8}	7^{7}	4
8	(France) Q Halys	7^{10}	6^{5}	6
(Netherlands) T van Rijthoven	7^{7}	4	2
Q	(Germany) M Bachinger	6^{4}	6	6
(Slovakia) L Lacko	6^{2}	6	7^{7}
6	(Czech Republic) T Macháč	7^{7}	4	6^{2}

Quarterfinals
Q	(Czech Republic) J Forejtek	6	2	2
8	(France) Q Halys	3	6	6
Q	(Germany) M Bachinger	5	6	4
(Slovakia) L Lacko	7	3	6

Semifinals
8	(France) Q Halys	1	6^{5}
(Slovakia) L Lacko	6	7^{7}

=== Bottom half ===
First round
7	(United States) M Cressy	6	7
LL	(Japan) H Moriya	3	5
Q	(Finland) O Virtanen	7	6
WC	(Germany) MH Rehberg	5	2
Alt	(Ukraine) V Sachko	2	4
(Poland) K Żuk	6	6
Alt	(Germany) T Kamke	5	3
3	(Italy) A Seppi	7	6
5	(Germany) O Otte	6^{4}	6	6
(Netherlands) R Haase	7^{7}	4	4
(Turkey) C İlkel	7^{7}	5	1
Q	(Germany) J Lenz	6^{5}	7	6
(Switzerland) M-A Hüsler	7^{7}	2	6^{0}
WC	(Germany) M Rosenkranz	6^{2}	6	7^{7}
(Germany) M Marterer	7^{10}	6
2	(Czech Republic) J Veselý	6^{8}	4

Second round
7	(United States) M Cressy	7^{7}	3	7
Q	(Finland) O Virtanen	6^{5}	6	5
(Poland) K Żuk	4	6	7^{7}
3	(Italy) A Seppi	6	4	6^{4}
5	(Germany) O Otte	6	6
Q	(Germany) J Lenz	3	4
WC	(Germany) M Rosenkranz	3	6^{3}
(Germany) M Marterer	6	7^{7}

Quarterfinals
7	(United States) M Cressy	6^{7}	6	7^{7}
(Poland) K Żuk	7^{9}	4	6^{4}
5	(Germany) O Otte	3	6	7^{7}
(Germany) M Marterer	6	3	6^{5}

Semifinals
7	(United States) M Cressy	5	6	6^{5}
5	(Germany) O Otte	7	2	7^{7}
