= 2021 Wolffkran Open – Doubles =

Doubles
- 2021 Wolffkran Open

Final
- Champions: (Germany) Andre Begemann (Slovakia) Igor Zelenay
- Runners-up: (Czech Republic) Marek Gengel (Czech Republic) Tomáš Macháč
- Score: 6–2, 6–4

Events
Singles	Doubles
- Wolffkran Open

Andre Begemann and David Pel were the defending champions but only Begemann chose to defend his title, partnering Igor Zelenay.

Begemann successfully defended his title after defeating Marek Gengel and Tomáš Macháč 6–2, 6–4 in the final.

== Seeds ==
1. (Czech Republic) Roman Jebavý / (Denmark) Frederik Nielsen (first round)
2. (Poland) Szymon Walków / (Poland) Jan Zieliński (semifinals)
3. (Croatia) Antonio Šančić / (New Zealand) Artem Sitak (semifinals)
4. (Germany) Andre Begemann / (Slovakia) Igor Zelenay (champions)

== Draw ==
Key

- Q = Qualifier
- WC = Wild card
- LL = Lucky loser
- Alt = Alternate
- ITF = ITF entry
- PR = Protected ranking
- SR = Special ranking
- SE = Special exempt
- JE = Junior exempt
- JR = Junior Accelerator Programme entrant
- CO = College Accelerator Programme entrant
- NG = Next Gen Accelerator Program entrant
- w/o = Walkover
- r = Retired
- d = Defaulted

First round
1	(Czech Republic) R Jebavý (Denmark) F Nielsen	2	4
Alt	(Czech Republic) M Gengel (Czech Republic) T Macháč	6	6
(Netherlands) R Haase (Netherlands) M Hermans	6	6
(Turkey) A Çelikbilek (Turkey) C İlkel	4	4
3	(Croatia) A Šančić (New Zealand) A Sitak	7^{7}	5	[10]
(Moldova) A Cozbinov (United States) M Cressy	6^{4}	7	[4]
(Romania) VV Cornea (India) R Ramanathan	6	3	[10]
WC	(Germany) T Sandkaulen (Germany) H Squire	3	6	[7]
WC	(Germany) P Florig (Germany) MH Rehberg	4	3
(Germany) M Marterer (Ukraine) V Sachko	6	6
(Switzerland) M-A Hüsler (Switzerland) L Margaroli	4	6^{2}
4	(Germany) A Begemann (Slovakia) I Zelenay	6	7^{7}
WC	(Germany) Marko Krickovic (Germany) Michael Weindl	6^{2}	4
(Germany) J Lenz (Austria) T-S Weissborn	7^{7}	6
(India) J Nedunchezhiyan (India) P Raja	5	6^{10}
2	(Poland) S Walków (Poland) J Zieliński	7	7^{12}

Quarterfinals
Alt	(Czech Republic) M Gengel (Czech Republic) T Macháč	7^{7}	6
(Netherlands) R Haase (Netherlands) M Hermans	6^{5}	2
3	(Croatia) A Šančić (New Zealand) A Sitak	6	6
(Romania) VV Cornea (India) R Ramanathan	4	4
(Germany) M Marterer (Ukraine) V Sachko	4	6^{4}
4	(Germany) A Begemann (Slovakia) I Zelenay	6	7^{7}
(Germany) J Lenz (Austria) T-S Weissborn	6^{3}	4
2	(Poland) S Walków (Poland) J Zieliński	7^{7}	6

Semifinals
Alt	(Czech Republic) M Gengel (Czech Republic) T Macháč	7^{7}	2	[10]
3	(Croatia) A Šančić (New Zealand) A Sitak	6^{5}	6	[7]
4	(Germany) A Begemann (Slovakia) I Zelenay	6	1	[10]
2	(Poland) S Walków (Poland) J Zieliński	4	6	[7]

Final
Alt	(Czech Republic) M Gengel (Czech Republic) T Macháč	2	4
4	(Germany) A Begemann (Slovakia) I Zelenay	6	6
