= 2019 Wolffkran Open =

- Date: 14–20 October
- Edition: 3rd
- Surface: Carpet
- Location: Ismaning, Germany

Champions

Singles
- (Slovakia) Lukáš Lacko

Doubles
- (France) Quentin Halys / (France) Tristan Lamasine
← 2018 ·	Wolffkran Open	· 2020 →

The 2019 Wolffkran Open was a professional tennis tournament played on carpet courts. It was the third edition of the tournament which was part of the 2019 ATP Challenger Tour. It took place in Ismaning, Germany between 14 and 20 October 2019.

== Singles main draw entrants ==
=== Seeds ===
Country	Player	Rank^{1}	Seed
CZE	Jiří Veselý	128	1
NED	Robin Haase	150	2
ITA	Filippo Baldi	157	3
NED	Tallon Griekspoor	168	4
GER	Matthias Bachinger	178	5
IND	Ramkumar Ramanathan	182	6
FRA	Quentin Halys	183	7
GER	Yannick Hanfmann	191	8
KAZ	Aleksandr Nedovyesov	212	9
ESP	Adrián Menéndez Maceiras	213	10
FRA	Constant Lestienne	215	11
USA	Maxime Cressy	220	12
FRA	Tristan Lamasine	221	13
ITA	Stefano Napolitano	230	14
GER	Daniel Masur	236	15
SVK	Lukáš Lacko	237	16

- ^{1} Rankings are as of 7 October 2019.

=== Other entrants ===
The following players received wildcards into the singles main draw:

- (Germany) Daniel Altmaier
- (Germany) Matthias Bachinger
- (Italy) Filippo Baldi
- (Czech Republic) Jonáš Forejtek
- (Germany) Louis Wessels

The following player received entry into the singles main draw using a protected ranking:

- (Austria) Maximilian Neuchrist

The following player received entry into the singles main draw as an alternate:

- (Ukraine) Illya Marchenko

The following players received entry from the qualifying draw:

- (Germany) Julian Lenz
- (Germany) Mats Rosenkranz

The following player received entry as a lucky loser:

- (Ukraine) Vitaliy Sachko

== Champions ==
=== Singles ===
- (Slovakia) Lukáš Lacko def. (United States) Maxime Cressy 6–3, 6–0.

=== Doubles ===
- (France) Quentin Halys / (France) Tristan Lamasine def. (United States) James Cerretani / (United States) Maxime Cressy 6–3, 7–5.
