= 2023 Wolffkran Open – Doubles =

Doubles
- 2023 Wolffkran Open

Final
- Champions: (India) Sriram Balaji (Germany) Andre Begemann
- Runners-up: (Germany) Constantin Frantzen (Germany) Hendrik Jebens
- Score: 7–6^{(7–4)}, 6–4

Events
Singles	Doubles
← 2022 ·	Wolffkran Open	· 2024 →

Michael Geerts and Patrik Niklas-Salminen were the defending champions but chose not to defend their title.

Sriram Balaji and Andre Begemann won the title after defeating Constantin Frantzen and Hendrik Jebens 7–6^{(7–4)}, 6–4 in the final.

== Seeds ==
1. (United States) Robert Galloway / (France) Albano Olivetti (semifinals)
2. (Germany) Constantin Frantzen / (Germany) Hendrik Jebens (final)
3. (Czech Republic) Petr Nouza / (Austria) Philipp Oswald (first round)
4. (India) Anirudh Chandrasekar / (India) Vijay Sundar Prashanth (semifinals)

== Draw ==
=== Key ===
- Q = Qualifier
- WC = Wild card
- LL = Lucky loser
- Alt = Alternate
- ITF = ITF entry
- PR = Protected ranking
- SR = Special ranking
- SE = Special exempt
- JE = Junior exempt
- JR = Junior Accelerator Programme entrant
- CO = College Accelerator Programme entrant
- NG = Next Gen Accelerator Program entrant
- w/o = Walkover
- r = Retired
- d = Defaulted

First round
1	(United States) R Galloway (France) A Olivetti	7	6
(Germany) D Masur (Germany) J Schnaitter	5	4
(Austria) D Pichler (Germany) L Wessels	1
WC	(Germany) Liam Gavrielides (Germany) Yannik Kelm	2^{r}
3	(Czech Republic) P Nouza (Austria) P Oswald	6^{6}	3
(India) S Balaji (Germany) A Begemann	7^{8}	6
(United Kingdom) J Choinski (Kazakhstan) D Yevseyev	3	6^{3}
(Pakistan) A-u-H Qureshi (Greece) Pe Tsitsipas	6	7^{7}
(Greece) M Kalovelonis (Ukraine) O Krutykh	3	1
(United Kingdom) L Johnson (Tunisia) S Mansouri	6	6
(United Kingdom) S Duncan (Canada) K Stevenson	7^{7}	6^{1}	[4]
4	(India) A Chandrasekar (India) VS Prashanth	6^{5}	7^{7}	[10]
(Germany) R Molleker (Germany) H Squire	5	3
(Austria) N Oberleitner (Poland) S Walków	7	6
WC	(Norway) V Durasovic (Germany) Elmar Ejupovic	6^{4}	7^{7}	[9]
2	(Germany) C Frantzen (Germany) H Jebens	7^{7}	6^{4}	[11]

Quarterfinals
1	(United States) R Galloway (France) A Olivetti	7^{7}	7^{7}
(Austria) D Pichler (Germany) L Wessels	6^{3}	6^{4}
(India) S Balaji (Germany) A Begemann	6	6
(Pakistan) A-u-H Qureshi (Greece) Pe Tsitsipas	1	4
(United Kingdom) L Johnson (Tunisia) S Mansouri	2	4
4	(India) A Chandrasekar (India) VS Prashanth	6	6
(Austria) N Oberleitner (Poland) S Walków	4	6	[7]
2	(Germany) C Frantzen (Germany) H Jebens	6	4	[10]

Semifinals
1	(United States) R Galloway (France) A Olivetti	7	1	[9]
(India) S Balaji (Germany) A Begemann	5	6	[11]
4	(India) A Chandrasekar (India) VS Prashanth	3	6^{4}
2	(Germany) C Frantzen (Germany) H Jebens	6	7^{7}

Final
(India) S Balaji (Germany) A Begemann	7^{7}	6
2	(Germany) C Frantzen (Germany) H Jebens	6^{4}	4
