= 2017 Wolffkran Open – Singles =

Singles
- 2017 Wolffkran Open

Final
- Champion: (Germany) Yannick Hanfmann
- Runner-up: (Italy) Lorenzo Sonego
- Score: 6–4, 3–6, 7–5

Events
Singles	Doubles
Wolffkran Open	· 2018 →

This was the first edition of the tournament.

Yannick Hanfmann won the title after defeating Lorenzo Sonego 6–4, 3–6, 7–5 in the final.

== Seeds ==
1. (Germany) Maximilian Marterer (withdrew)
2. (Germany) Dustin Brown (semifinals)
3. (Germany) Yannick Hanfmann (champion)
4. (Germany) Oscar Otte (withdrew)
5. (Italy) Salvatore Caruso (quarterfinals)
6. (Australia) Alex De Minaur (first round)
7. (Germany) Matthias Bachinger (second round, retired)
8. (Germany) Daniel Altmaier (first round)

== Draw ==
=== Key ===
- Q = Qualifier
- WC = Wild card
- LL = Lucky loser
- Alt = Alternate
- SE = Special exempt
- PR = Protected ranking
- ITF = ITF entry
- JE = Junior exempt
- w/o = Walkover
- r = Retired
- d = Defaulted
- SR = Special ranking

=== Finals ===
Semifinals
SE	(Italy) Matteo Donati	6^{3}	4
SE	(Italy) Lorenzo Sonego	7^{7}	6
3	(Germany) Yannick Hanfmann	6^{5}	6	7
2	(Germany) Dustin Brown	7^{7}	3	5

Final
SE	(Italy) Lorenzo Sonego	4	6	5
3	(Germany) Yannick Hanfmann	6	3	7

=== Top half ===
First round
LL	(Germany) M Rosenkranz	3	2
SE	(Italy) M Donati	6	6
(Spain) P Martínez	3	6	6
WC	(Germany) R Molleker	6	3	4
WC	(Germany) T Pütz	6	3	6
WC	(Germany) K Krawietz	3	6	4
(Italy) M Viola	4	6^{3}
5	(Italy) S Caruso	6	7^{7}
LL	(Russia) Shalva Dzhanashia	6	6
WC	(Austria) A Haider-Maurer	3	4
(Germany) D Masur	6	3	6
(Czech Republic) Petr Michnev	1	6	3
(Spain) B Zapata Miralles	6	6
(Croatia) A Pavić	1	4
SE	(Italy) L Sonego	7^{7}	6
8	(Germany) D Altmaier	6^{5}	4

Second round
SE	(Italy) M Donati	6	7^{7}
(Spain) P Martínez	1	6^{4}
WC	(Germany) T Pütz	4	6	6^{5}
5	(Italy) S Caruso	6	4	7^{7}
LL	(Russia) S Dzhanashia	2	3
(Germany) D Masur	6	6
(Spain) B Zapata Miralles	3	6	3
SE	(Italy) L Sonego	6	4	6

Quarterfinals
SE	(Italy) M Donati	7	6
5	(Italy) S Caruso	5	3
(Germany) D Masur	6	4	4
SE	(Italy) L Sonego	3	6	6

Semifinals
SE	(Italy) M Donati	6^{3}	4
SE	(Italy) L Sonego	7^{7}	6

=== Bottom half ===
First round
6	(Australia) A De Minaur	4	1
PR	(Netherlands) I Sijsling	6	6
LL	(Ukraine) V Uzhylovskyi	2	4^{r}
(France) T Lamasine	6	5
(Germany) Jeremy Jahn	7^{7}	3	7^{7}
(Lithuania) L Grigelis	6^{4}	6	6^{3}
(Czech Republic) Marek Jaloviec	6^{5}	1^{r}
3	(Germany) Y Hanfmann	7^{7}	4
7	(Germany) M Bachinger	6	6
Q	(Belgium) Yannick Vandenbulcke	2	0
Q	(Poland) H Hurkacz	6	7
(Spain) N Kuhn	3	5
Q	(Germany) Tobias Simon	6	4	7^{7}
Q	(Switzerland) M-A Hüsler	3	6	6^{4}
(Germany) M Moraing	7^{9}	6^{2}	1
2	(Germany) D Brown	6^{7}	7^{7}	6

Second round
PR	(Netherlands) I Sijsling	6	1	6^{3}
(France) T Lamasine	4	6	7^{7}
(Germany) J Jahn	6^{4}	6	3
3	(Germany) Y Hanfmann	7^{7}	4	6
7	(Germany) M Bachinger	7^{7}	0^{r}
Q	(Poland) H Hurkacz	6^{5}	0
Q	(Germany) T Simon	4	7^{8}	6^{3}
2	(Germany) D Brown	6	6^{6}	7^{7}

Quarterfinals
(France) T Lamasine	1	2
3	(Germany) Y Hanfmann	6	6
Q	(Poland) H Hurkacz	4	3
2	(Germany) D Brown	6	6

Semifinals
3	(Germany) Y Hanfmann	6^{5}	6	7
2	(Germany) D Brown	7^{7}	3	5
