= 2022 Wolffkran Open =

- Date: 10 – 16 October
- Edition: 6th
- Surface: Carpet, Indoor
- Location: Ismaning, Germany

Champions

Singles
- (France) Quentin Halys

Doubles
- (Belgium) Michael Geerts / (Finland) Patrik Niklas-Salminen
← 2021 ·	Wolffkran Open	· 2023 →

The 2022 Wolffkran Open was a professional tennis tournament played on carpet courts. It was the sixth edition of the tournament which was part of the 2022 ATP Challenger Tour. It took place in Ismaning, Germany between 10 and 16 October 2022.

== Singles main draw entrants ==
=== Seeds ===
Country	Player	Rank^{1}	Seed
FRA	Quentin Halys	74	1
CZE	Tomáš Macháč	110	2
CAN	Vasek Pospisil	136	3
AUT	Dennis Novak	140	4
GER	Daniel Masur	179	5
SUI	Antoine Bellier	190	6
BIH	Nerman Fatić	195	7
FRA	Antoine Escoffier	207	8

- ^{1} Rankings are as of 3 October 2022.

=== Other entrants ===
The following players received wildcards into the singles main draw:

- (Germany) Philip Florig
- (Germany) Max Hans Rehberg
- (Germany) Marko Topo

The following players received entry into the singles main draw as alternates:

- Evgeny Karlovskiy
- (Ukraine) Vitaliy Sachko

The following players received entry from the qualifying draw:

- (Germany) Matthias Bachinger
- (China) Bu Yunchaokete
- (Germany) Elmar Ejupovic
- (United Kingdom) Billy Harris
- (Germany) Julian Lenz
- (Poland) Kacper Żuk

== Champions ==
=== Singles ===
- (France) Quentin Halys def. (Germany) Max Hans Rehberg 7–6^{(8–6)}, 6–3.

=== Doubles ===
- (Belgium) Michael Geerts / (Finland) Patrik Niklas-Salminen def. (Germany) Fabian Fallert / (Germany) Hendrik Jebens 7–6^{(7–5)}, 7–6^{(10–8)}.
