= 2019 Wolffkran Open – Singles =

Singles
- 2019 Wolffkran Open

Final
- Champion: (Slovakia) Lukáš Lacko
- Runner-up: (United States) Maxime Cressy
- Score: 6–3, 6–0

Events
Singles	Doubles
← 2018 ·	Wolffkran Open	· 2020 →

Filippo Baldi was the defending champion but lost in the third round to Lukáš Lacko.

Lacko won the title after defeating Maxime Cressy 6–3, 6–0 in the final.

== Seeds ==
All seeds receive a bye into the second round.

1. (Czech Republic) Jiří Veselý (semifinals)
2. (Netherlands) Robin Haase (second round)
3. (Italy) Filippo Baldi (third round)
4. (Netherlands) Tallon Griekspoor (second round)
5. (Germany) Matthias Bachinger (second round, retired)
6. (India) Ramkumar Ramanathan (second round)
7. (France) Quentin Halys (third round)
8. (Germany) Yannick Hanfmann (third round)
9. (Kazakhstan) Aleksandr Nedovyesov (second round)
10. (Spain) Adrián Menéndez Maceiras (quarterfinals)
11. (France) Constant Lestienne (third round)
12. (United States) Maxime Cressy (final)
13. (France) Tristan Lamasine (second round)
14. (Italy) Stefano Napolitano (third round)
15. (Germany) Daniel Masur (quarterfinals)
16. (Slovakia) Lukáš Lacko (champion)

== Draw ==
=== Key ===
- Q = Qualifier
- WC = Wild card
- LL = Lucky loser
- Alt = Alternate
- SE = Special exempt
- PR = Protected ranking
- ITF = ITF entry
- JE = Junior exempt
- w/o = Walkover
- r = Retired
- d = Defaulted
- SR = Special ranking

=== Finals ===
Quarterfinals
1	(Czech Republic) Jiří Veselý	7^{7}	6
10	(Spain) Adrián Menéndez Maceiras	6^{4}	2
15	(Germany) Daniel Masur	3	4
12	(United States) Maxime Cressy	6	6
(Russia) Teymuraz Gabashvili	7	4	4
16	(Slovakia) Lukáš Lacko	5	6	6
Q	(Germany) Julian Lenz	6	4
(Germany) Johannes Härteis	1	2^{r}

Semifinals
1	(Czech Republic) Jiří Veselý	7^{7}	4	4
12	(United States) Maxime Cressy	6^{4}	6	6
16	(Slovakia) Lukáš Lacko	6	3	7^{12}
Q	(Germany) Julian Lenz	3	6	6^{10}

Final
12	(United States) Maxime Cressy	3	0
16	(Slovakia) Lukáš Lacko	6	6

=== Top half ===
==== Section 1 ====
First round
(Austria) L Miedler	7^{7}	6
(Spain) R Ortega Olmedo	6^{3}	4
WC	(Czech Republic) J Forejtek	6	6
WC	(Germany) L Wessels	1	2
(Germany) B Hassan	6	1
(Italy) A Arnaboldi	2	0^{r}
(Turkey) C İlkel	6	6
(Italy) R Bonadio	3	2

Second round
1	(Czech Republic) J Veselý	6	6^{2}	6
(Austria) L Miedler	4	7^{7}	3
WC	(Czech Republic) J Forejtek	5	1
14	(Italy) S Napolitano	7	6
10	(Spain) A Menéndez Maceiras	6	6
(Germany) B Hassan	2	4
(Turkey) C İlkel	7^{11}	4	6^{4}
7	(France) Q Halys	6^{9}	6	7^{7}

Third round
1	(Czech Republic) J Veselý	6^{9}	6	6
14	(Italy) S Napolitano	7^{11}	4	3
10	(Spain) A Menéndez Maceiras	3	7^{7}	7^{7}
7	(France) Q Halys	6	6^{5}	6^{5}

Quarterfinals
1	(Czech Republic) J Veselý	7^{7}	6
10	(Spain) A Menéndez Maceiras	6^{4}	2

==== Section 2 ====
First round
(Netherlands) B van de Zandschulp	6^{6}	6	4
(Italy) L Vanni	7^{8}	4	6
(Netherlands) J Sels	7^{7}	6
(United Kingdom) E Hoyt	6^{2}	4
(Belarus) U Ignatik	6^{4}	6	7^{7}
(Italy) A Pellegrino	7^{7}	4	6^{4}
(United Kingdom) J Ward	7^{7}	7
(Russia) P Kotov	6^{2}	5

Second round
4	(Netherlands) T Griekspoor	4	6^{4}
(Italy) L Vanni	6	7^{7}
(Netherlands) J Sels	7	4	4
15	(Germany) D Masur	5	6	6
12	(United States) M Cressy	6	3	6
(Belarus) U Ignatik	3	6	3
(United Kingdom) J Ward	6^{2}	3
8	(Germany) Y Hanfmann	7^{7}	6

Third round
(Italy) L Vanni	3	5
15	(Germany) D Masur	6	7
12	(United States) M Cressy	4	6	6
8	(Germany) Y Hanfmann	6	4	3

Quarterfinals
15	(Germany) D Masur	3	4
12	(United States) M Cressy	6	6

=== Bottom half ===
==== Section 3 ====
First round
(Switzerland) S Ehrat	3	6^{2}
(Russia) T Gabashvili	6	7^{7}
(Switzerland) M-A Hüsler	7^{7}	6
(Czech Republic) V Šafránek	6^{2}	3
Alt	(Ukraine) I Marchenko	6^{8}	3
LL	(Ukraine) V Sachko	7^{10}	6
(France) H Grenier	3	4
(France) G Blancaneaux	6	6

Second round
6	(India) R Ramanathan	3	6^{3}
(Russia) T Gabashvili	6	7^{7}
(Switzerland) M-A Hüsler	6	6
9	(Kazakhstan) A Nedovyesov	4	4
16	(Slovakia) L Lacko	7	2	6
LL	(Ukraine) V Sachko	5	6	3
(France) G Blancaneaux	6	3	1
3/WC	(Italy) F Baldi	4	6	6

Third round
(Russia) T Gabashvili	6	4	7
(Switzerland) M-A Hüsler	3	6	5
16	(Slovakia) L Lacko	6	6
3/WC	(Italy) F Baldi	1	4

Quarterfinals
(Russia) T Gabashvili	7	4	4
16	(Slovakia) L Lacko	5	6	6

==== Section 4 ====
First round
(Slovakia) L Klein	4	3
Q	(Germany) J Lenz	6	6
WC	(Germany) D Altmaier	4	6	7^{10}
(United Kingdom) J Choinski	6	4	6^{8}
Q	(Germany) M Rosenkranz	4	4
(Czech Republic) Z Kolář	6	6
(Germany) J Härteis	6	6
PR	(Austria) M Neuchrist	4	4

Second round
5/WC	(Germany) M Bachinger	3^{r}
Q	(Germany) J Lenz	5
WC	(Germany) D Altmaier	3	5
11	(France) C Lestienne	6	7
13	(France) T Lamasine	4	5
(Czech Republic) Z Kolář	6	7
(Germany) J Härteis	6	6^{6}	7^{7}
2	(Netherlands) R Haase	4	7^{8}	6^{2}

Third round
Q	(Germany) J Lenz	7^{7}	6
11	(France) C Lestienne	6^{1}	4
(Czech Republic) Z Kolář	6^{4}	6^{5}
(Germany) J Härteis	7^{7}	7^{7}

Quarterfinals
Q	(Germany) J Lenz	6	4
(Germany) J Härteis	1	2^{r}
