= 2017 Wolffkran Open – Doubles =

Doubles
- 2017 Wolffkran Open

Final
- Champions: (Croatia) Marin Draganja (Croatia) Tomislav Draganja
- Runners-up: (Germany) Dustin Brown (Germany) Tim Pütz
- Score: 6–7^{(1–7)}, 6–2, [10–8]

Events
Singles	Doubles
Wolffkran Open	· 2018 →

This was the first edition of the tournament.

Marin and Tomislav Draganja won the title after defeating Dustin Brown and Tim Pütz 6–7^{(1–7)}, 6–2, [10–8] in the final.

== Seeds ==
1. (Netherlands) Sander Arends / (Germany) Kevin Krawietz (first round)
2. (Australia) Rameez Junaid / (Canada) Adil Shamasdin (first round)
3. (Croatia) Marin Draganja / (Croatia) Tomislav Draganja (champions)
4. (Germany) Alexander Satschko / (Austria) Tristan-Samuel Weissborn (first round)

== Draw ==
=== Key ===
- Q = Qualifier
- WC = Wild card
- LL = Lucky loser
- Alt = Alternate
- SE = Special exempt
- PR = Protected ranking
- ITF = ITF entry
- JE = Junior exempt
- w/o = Walkover
- r = Retired
- d = Defaulted
- SR = Special ranking

First round
1	(Netherlands) S Arends (Germany) K Krawietz	1	6	[8]
WC	(Poland) H Hurkacz (Ukraine) Daniil Zarichanskiyy	6	4	[10]
(United Kingdom) S Clayton (United Kingdom) J O'Mara	6	6
(Turkey) T Altuna (Czech Republic) Petr Michnev	1	2
3	(Croatia) M Draganja (Croatia) T Draganja	6	6
WC	(Germany) R Molleker (Germany) Sami Reinwein	4	4
(Spain) N Kuhn (Spain) P Martínez	7^{11}	5	[10]
WC	(Germany) Kai Lemstra (Germany) M Rosenkranz	6^{9}	7	[8]
(Belarus) A Bury (Ukraine) V Uzhylovskyi	7^{7}	6
(Australia) A De Minaur (Spain) D Vega Hernández	6^{5}	2
(Germany) D Brown (Germany) T Pütz	1	6	[11]
4	(Germany) A Satschko (Austria) T-S Weissborn	6	3	[9]
(Germany) Y Hanfmann (Germany) D Masur	4	6	[10]
(Lithuania) L Grigelis (Italy) A Motti	6	3	[5]
(Poland) T Bednarek (Netherlands) D Pel	6	6
2	(Australia) R Junaid (Canada) A Shamasdin	3	3

Quarterfinals
WC	(Poland) H Hurkacz (Ukraine) D Zarichanskiyy	4	4
(United Kingdom) S Clayton (United Kingdom) J O'Mara	6	6
3	(Croatia) M Draganja (Croatia) T Draganja	w/o
(Spain) N Kuhn (Spain) P Martínez
(Belarus) A Bury (Ukraine) V Uzhylovskyi	6^{4}	3
(Germany) D Brown (Germany) T Pütz	7^{7}	6
(Germany) Y Hanfmann (Germany) D Masur	1	2
(Poland) T Bednarek (Netherlands) D Pel	6	6

Semifinals
(United Kingdom) S Clayton (United Kingdom) J O'Mara	4	6	[12]
3	(Croatia) M Draganja (Croatia) T Draganja	6	4	[14]
(Germany) D Brown (Germany) T Pütz	6	6
(Poland) T Bednarek (Netherlands) D Pel	3	4

Final
3	(Croatia) M Draganja (Croatia) T Draganja	6^{1}	6	[10]
(Germany) D Brown (Germany) T Pütz	7^{7}	2	[8]
