= 2018 Wolffkran Open – Doubles =

Doubles
- 2018 Wolffkran Open

Final
- Champions: (India) Purav Raja (Croatia) Antonio Šančić
- Runners-up: (Australia) Rameez Junaid (Netherlands) David Pel
- Score: 5–7, 6–4, [10–5]

Events
Singles	Doubles
← 2017 ·	Wolffkran Open	· 2019 →

Marin and Tomislav Draganja were the defending champions but only Tomislav chose to defend his title, partnering Nikola Čačić. Tomislav Draganja lost in the quarterfinals to Rameez Junaid and David Pel.

Purav Raja and Antonio Šančić won the title after defeating Junaid and Pel 5–7, 6–4, [10–5] in the final.

== Seeds ==
1. (India) Purav Raja / (Croatia) Antonio Šančić (champions)
2. (Australia) Rameez Junaid / (Netherlands) David Pel (final)
3. (Germany) Dustin Brown / (Germany) Kevin Krawietz (quarterfinals, withdrew)
4. (Switzerland) Luca Margaroli / (Austria) Tristan-Samuel Weissborn (semifinals)

== Draw ==
=== Key ===
- Q = Qualifier
- WC = Wild card
- LL = Lucky loser
- Alt = Alternate
- SE = Special exempt
- PR = Protected ranking
- ITF = ITF entry
- JE = Junior exempt
- w/o = Walkover
- r = Retired
- d = Defaulted
- SR = Special ranking

First round
1	(India) P Raja (Croatia) A Šančić	6	7^{7}
(Germany) A Begemann (Slovakia) F Polášek	4	6^{5}
(Bosnia and Herzegovina) T Brkić (Croatia) A Pavić	7^{7}	7
(Croatia) I Sabanov (Croatia) M Sabanov	6^{3}	5
4	(Switzerland) L Margaroli (Austria) T-S Weissborn	6	6
(Kazakhstan) T Khabibulin (Poland) S Walków	2	3
(France) Q Halys (France) A Olivetti	3	4
(Italy) L Sonego (Italy) A Vavassori	6	6
WC	(Germany) D Masur (Germany) C Seraphim	7^{7}	6^{6}	[5]
WC	(Germany) Jeremy Jahn (Germany) Marc Sieber	6^{4}	7^{8}	[10]
(Poland) T Bednarek (Austria) L Miedler	0	3
3	(Germany) D Brown (Germany) K Krawietz	6	6
(United Kingdom) S Clayton (Italy) J Ocleppo	4	4
(Serbia) N Čačić (Croatia) T Draganja	6	6
WC	(Germany) Bastien Presuhn (Germany) L Wessels	7^{7}	2	[7]
2	(Australia) R Junaid (Netherlands) D Pel	6^{5}	6	[10]

Quarterfinals
1	(India) P Raja (Croatia) A Šančić	7	6
(Bosnia and Herzegovina) T Brkić (Croatia) A Pavić	5	2
4	(Switzerland) L Margaroli (Austria) T-S Weissborn	7^{7}	6^{4}	[10]
(Italy) L Sonego (Italy) A Vavassori	6^{4}	7^{7}	[7]
WC	(Germany) J Jahn (Germany) M Sieber	w/o
3	(Germany) D Brown (Germany) K Krawietz
(Serbia) N Čačić (Croatia) T Draganja	3	4
2	(Australia) R Junaid (Netherlands) D Pel	6	6

Semifinals
1	(India) P Raja (Croatia) A Šančić	6	6
4	(Switzerland) L Margaroli (Austria) T-S Weissborn	4	4
WC	(Germany) J Jahn (Germany) M Sieber	6^{5}	2
2	(Australia) R Junaid (Netherlands) D Pel	7^{7}	6

Final
1	(India) P Raja (Croatia) A Šančić	5	6	[10]
2	(Australia) R Junaid (Netherlands) D Pel	7	4	[5]
