= 2018 Wolffkran Open =

- Date: 15–21 October
- Edition: 2nd
- Surface: Carpet
- Location: Ismaning, Germany

Champions

Singles
- (Italy) Filippo Baldi

Doubles
- (India) Purav Raja / (Croatia) Antonio Šančić
← 2017 ·	Wolffkran Open	· 2019 →

The 2018 Wolffkran Open was a professional tennis tournament played on carpet courts. It was the second edition of the tournament which was part of the 2018 ATP Challenger Tour. It took place in Ismaning, Germany between 15 and 21 October 2018.

== Singles main draw entrants ==
=== Seeds ===
Country	Player	Rank^{1}	Seed
ITA	Lorenzo Sonego	86	1
FRA	Ugo Humbert	112	2
ARG	Marco Trungelliti	129	3
ITA	Stefano Travaglia	142	4
AUT	Dennis Novak	145	5
FRA	Grégoire Barrère	152	6
FRA	Quentin Halys	154	7
AUT	Lucas Miedler	210	8

- ^{1} Rankings are as of 8 October 2018.

=== Other entrants ===
The following players received wildcards into the singles main draw:

- (Germany) Jeremy Jahn
- (Germany) Kai Lemstra
- (Germany) Christian Seraphim
- (Germany) Louis Wessels

The following players received entry into the singles main draw as special exempts:

- (France) Grégoire Barrère
- (France) Ugo Humbert

The following players received entry from the qualifying draw:

- (Austria) Alexander Erler
- (Germany) Johannes Härteis
- (Slovakia) Lukáš Klein
- (France) Tristan Lamasine

== Champions ==
=== Singles ===
- (Italy) Filippo Baldi def. (France) Gleb Sakharov 6–4, 6–4.

=== Doubles ===
- (India) Purav Raja / (Croatia) Antonio Šančić def. (Australia) Rameez Junaid / (Netherlands) David Pel 5–7, 6–4, [10–5].
