= 2022 Wolffkran Open – Doubles =

Doubles
- 2022 Wolffkran Open

Final
- Champions: (Belgium) Michael Geerts (Finland) Patrik Niklas-Salminen
- Runners-up: (Germany) Fabian Fallert (Germany) Hendrik Jebens
- Score: 7–6^{(7–5)}, 7–6^{(10–8)}

Events
Singles	Doubles
- Wolffkran Open

Andre Begemann and Igor Zelenay were the defending champions but chose not to defend their title.

Michael Geerts and Patrik Niklas-Salminen won the title after defeating Fabian Fallert and Hendrik Jebens 7–6^{(7–5)}, 7–6^{(10–8)} in the final.

== Seeds ==
1. (United Kingdom) Jonny O'Mara / (India) Ramkumar Ramanathan (first round)
2. (Netherlands) Robin Haase / (Germany) Daniel Masur (quarterfinals)
3. (Germany) Fabian Fallert / (Germany) Hendrik Jebens (final)
4. (India) Purav Raja / (India) Divij Sharan (first round)

== Draw ==
Key

- Q = Qualifier
- WC = Wild card
- LL = Lucky loser
- Alt = Alternate
- ITF = ITF entry
- PR = Protected ranking
- SR = Special ranking
- SE = Special exempt
- JE = Junior exempt
- JR = Junior Accelerator Programme entrant
- CO = College Accelerator Programme entrant
- NG = Next Gen Accelerator Program entrant
- w/o = Walkover
- r = Retired
- d = Defaulted

First round
1	(United Kingdom) J O'Mara (India) R Ramanathan	6^{7}	7^{7}	[8]
I Liutarevich (Ukraine) V Manafov	7^{9}	6^{5}	[10]
(Germany) Niklas Schell (Germany) K Wehnelt	6^{4}	3
(Jamaica) D Brown (Germany) J Lenz	7^{7}	6
3	(Germany) F Fallert (Germany) H Jebens	6	6
(Czech Republic) Z Kolář (Czech Republic) P Nouza	4	4
(United Kingdom) B Harris (Australia) A Santillan	2	7^{7}	[10]
(Czech Republic) A Paulson (Ukraine) V Sachko	6	6^{5}	[5]
WC	(Germany) MH Rehberg (Germany) T Sandkaulen	2	4
(Bosnia and Herzegovina) M Bašić (Bosnia and Herzegovina) N Fatić	6	6
(Poland) S Walków (Poland) K Żuk	6	3	[10]
4	(India) P Raja (India) D Sharan	3	6	[7]
(Belgium) M Geerts (Finland) P Niklas-Salminen	6	7^{7}
WC	(Germany) J Schnaitter (Germany) M Wallner	4	6^{4}
(Uzbekistan) S Fayziev; E Karlovskiy	6^{2}	4
2	(Netherlands) R Haase (Germany) D Masur	7^{7}	6

Quarterfinals
I Liutarevich (Ukraine) V Manafov	5	6^{4}
(Jamaica) D Brown (Germany) J Lenz	7	7^{7}
3	(Germany) F Fallert (Germany) H Jebens	6	7^{7}
(United Kingdom) B Harris (Australia) A Santillan	3	6^{0}
(Bosnia and Herzegovina) M Bašić (Bosnia and Herzegovina) N Fatić	2	1
(Poland) S Walków (Poland) K Żuk	6	6
(Belgium) M Geerts (Finland) P Niklas-Salminen	6	7^{7}
2	(Netherlands) R Haase (Germany) D Masur	3	6^{5}

Semifinals
(Jamaica) D Brown (Germany) J Lenz	3	2
3	(Germany) F Fallert (Germany) H Jebens	6	6
(Poland) S Walków (Poland) K Żuk	3	3
(Belgium) M Geerts (Finland) P Niklas-Salminen	6	6

Final
3	(Germany) F Fallert (Germany) H Jebens	6^{5}	6^{8}
(Belgium) M Geerts (Finland) P Niklas-Salminen	7^{7}	7^{10}
