= 2019 Wolffkran Open – Doubles =

Tennis doubles champions: Halys and Lamasine

Doubles
- 2019 Wolffkran Open

Final
- Champions: (France) Quentin Halys (France) Tristan Lamasine
- Runners-up: (United States) James Cerretani (United States) Maxime Cressy
- Score: 6–3, 7–5

Events
Singles	Doubles
← 2018 ·	Wolffkran Open	· 2020 →

Purav Raja and Antonio Šančić were the defending champions but only Raja chose to defend his title, partnering Rameez Junaid. Raja lost in the first round to Scott Clayton and Evan Hoyt.

Quentin Halys and Tristan Lamasine won the title after defeating James Cerretani and Maxime Cressy 6–3, 7–5 in the final.

== Seeds ==
1. (India) Ramkumar Ramanathan / (Spain) David Vega Hernández (first round)
2. (Germany) Andre Begemann / (Romania) Florin Mergea (first round)
3. (Australia) Rameez Junaid / (India) Purav Raja (first round)
4. (Poland) Karol Drzewiecki / (Poland) Szymon Walków (quarterfinals)

== Draw ==
=== Key ===
- Q = Qualifier
- WC = Wild card
- LL = Lucky loser
- Alt = Alternate
- SE = Special exempt
- PR = Protected ranking
- ITF = ITF entry
- JE = Junior exempt
- w/o = Walkover
- r = Retired
- d = Defaulted
- SR = Special ranking

First round
1	(India) R Ramanathan (Spain) D Vega Hernández	6^{6}	5
(Netherlands) T Griekspoor (Netherlands) B van de Zandschulp	7^{8}	7
WC	(France) G Blancaneaux (Austria) M Neuchrist	4	7^{7}	[10]
(Kazakhstan) A Golubev (Kazakhstan) A Nedovyesov	6	6^{0}	[5]
3	(Australia) R Junaid (India) P Raja	6	6^{4}	[5]
(United Kingdom) S Clayton (United Kingdom) E Hoyt	4	7^{7}	[10]
(United States) J Cerretani (United States) M Cressy	6	6
WC	(Germany) D Altmaier (Germany) J Härteis	3	2
(Spain) S Martos Gornés (Spain) R Ortega Olmedo	3	6^{3}
(Finland) H Heliövaara (Ukraine) I Marchenko	6	7^{7}
(Germany) J Lenz (Germany) D Masur	4	4
4	(Poland) K Drzewiecki (Poland) S Walków	6	6
WC	(Germany) Kai Lemstra (Germany) Sven Lemstra	6^{4}	7^{7}	[10]
(Russia) T Gabashvili (Russia) P Kotov	7^{7}	6^{5}	[7]
(France) Q Halys (France) T Lamasine	4	6	[10]
2	(Germany) A Begemann (Romania) F Mergea	6	3	[8]

Quarterfinals
(Netherlands) T Griekspoor (Netherlands) B van de Zandschulp	6	6
WC	(France) G Blancaneaux (Austria) M Neuchrist	3	3
(United Kingdom) S Clayton (United Kingdom) E Hoyt	7^{7}	6^{5}	[6]
(United States) J Cerretani (United States) M Cressy	6^{4}	7^{7}	[10]
(Finland) H Heliövaara (Ukraine) I Marchenko	6	6
4	(Poland) K Drzewiecki (Poland) S Walków	1	4
WC	(Germany) K Lemstra (Germany) S Lemstra	1	6	[6]
(France) Q Halys (France) T Lamasine	6	3	[10]

Semifinals
(Netherlands) T Griekspoor (Netherlands) B van de Zandschulp	5	7^{7}	[5]
(United States) J Cerretani (United States) M Cressy	7	6^{2}	[10]
(Finland) H Heliövaara (Ukraine) I Marchenko	3	6^{4}
(France) Q Halys (France) T Lamasine	6	7^{7}

Final
(United States) J Cerretani (United States) M Cressy	3	5
(France) Q Halys (France) T Lamasine	6	7
