= 2019 Sparkassen ATP Challenger – Doubles =

Doubles
- 2019 Sparkassen ATP Challenger

Final
- Champions: (Serbia) Nikola Čačić (Croatia) Antonio Šančić
- Runners-up: (Netherlands) Sander Arends (Netherlands) David Pel
- Score: 6–7^{(5–7)}, 7–6^{(7–3)}, [10–7]

Events
Singles	Doubles
- Sparkassen ATP Challenger

Sander Gillé and Joran Vliegen were the defending champions but chose not to defend their title.

Nikola Čačić and Antonio Šančić won the title after defeating Sander Arends and David Pel 6–7^{(5–7)}, 7–6^{(7–3)}, [10–7] in the final.

== Seeds ==
1. (Monaco) Romain Arneodo / (New Zealand) Artem Sitak (first round)
2. (Netherlands) Sander Arends / (Netherlands) David Pel (final)
3. (Bosnia and Herzegovina) Tomislav Brkić / (Croatia) Ante Pavić (first round)
4. (Serbia) Nikola Čačić / (Croatia) Antonio Šančić (champions)

== Draw ==
Key

- Q = Qualifier
- WC = Wild card
- LL = Lucky loser
- Alt = Alternate
- ITF = ITF entry
- PR = Protected ranking
- SR = Special ranking
- SE = Special exempt
- JE = Junior exempt
- JR = Junior Accelerator Programme entrant
- CO = College Accelerator Programme entrant
- NG = Next Gen Accelerator Program entrant
- w/o = Walkover
- r = Retired
- d = Defaulted

First round
1	(Monaco) R Arneodo (New Zealand) A Sitak	6^{6}	7^{7}	[5]
(Russia) T Gabashvili (Russia) A Karatsev	7^{8}	6^{4}	[10]
(Italy) J Ocleppo (Spain) D Vega Hernández	6^{4}	6^{6}
PR	(Austria) M Neuchrist (Austria) T-S Weissborn	7^{7}	7^{8}
4	(Serbia) N Čačić (Croatia) A Šančić	6	6^{5}	[12]
(Germany) A Begemann (France) A Olivetti	4	7^{7}	[10]
WC	(Italy) R Brancaccio (Italy) A Pellegrino	7	6
(Croatia) I Sabanov (Croatia) M Sabanov	5	2
WC	(Italy) F Baldi (Italy) E Dalla Valle	2	4
(Germany) D Masur (Germany) O Otte	6	6
(United States) J Cerretani (United States) M Cressy	7^{7}	7^{7}
3	(Bosnia and Herzegovina) T Brkić (Croatia) A Pavić	6^{5}	6^{4}
(Italy) GM Moroni (Spain) B Zapata Miralles	4	3
(Spain) S Martos Gornés (Australia) S Puodziunas	6	6
WC	(Italy) Lorenzo Ferri (Italy) J Sinner	4	4
2	(Netherlands) S Arends (Netherlands) D Pel	6	6

Quarterfinals
(Russia) T Gabashvili (Russia) A Karatsev	5	7^{7}	[7]
PR	(Austria) M Neuchrist (Austria) T-S Weissborn	7	6^{4}	[10]
4	(Serbia) N Čačić (Croatia) A Šančić	6	6
WC	(Italy) R Brancaccio (Italy) A Pellegrino	0	3
(Germany) D Masur (Germany) O Otte	3	7^{7}	[10]
(United States) J Cerretani (United States) M Cressy	6	6^{4}	[12]
(Spain) S Martos Gornés (Australia) S Puodziunas	4	4
2	(Netherlands) S Arends (Netherlands) D Pel	6	6

Semifinals
PR	(Austria) M Neuchrist (Austria) T-S Weissborn	6^{5}	4
4	(Serbia) N Čačić (Croatia) A Šančić	7^{7}	6
(United States) J Cerretani (United States) M Cressy	4	2
2	(Netherlands) S Arends (Netherlands) D Pel	6	6

Final
4	(Serbia) N Čačić (Croatia) A Šančić	6^{5}	7^{7}	[10]
2	(Netherlands) S Arends (Netherlands) D Pel	7^{7}	6^{3}	[7]
