= 2017 Wolffkran Open =

- Date: 16–22 October
- Edition: 1st
- Surface: Carpet
- Location: Ismaning, Germany

Champions

Singles
- (Germany) Yannick Hanfmann

Doubles
- (Croatia) Marin Draganja / (Croatia) Tomislav Draganja
Wolffkran Open	· 2018 →

The 2017 Wolffkran Open was a professional tennis tournament played on carpet courts. It was the first edition of the tournament which was part of the 2017 ATP Challenger Tour. It took place in Ismaning, Germany between 16 and 22 October 2017.

== Singles main draw entrants ==
=== Seeds ===
Country	Player	Rank^{1}	Seed
~~GER~~	~~Maximilian Marterer~~	~~108~~	~~1~~
GER	Dustin Brown	124	2
GER	Yannick Hanfmann	134	3
~~GER~~	~~Oscar Otte~~	~~136~~	~~4~~
ITA	Salvatore Caruso	180	5
AUS	Alex De Minaur	188	6
GER	Matthias Bachinger	200	7
GER	Daniel Altmaier	227	8

- ^{1} Rankings are as of 9 October 2017.

=== Other entrants ===
The following players received wildcards into the singles main draw:

- (Austria) Andreas Haider-Maurer
- (Germany) Kevin Krawietz
- (Germany) Rudolf Molleker
- (Germany) Tim Pütz

The following players received entry into the singles main draw as special exempts:

- (Italy) Matteo Donati
- (Italy) Lorenzo Sonego

The following player received entry into the singles main draw using a protected ranking:

- (Netherlands) Igor Sijsling

The following players received entry from the qualifying draw:

- (Poland) Hubert Hurkacz
- (Switzerland) Marc-Andrea Hüsler
- (Germany) Tobias Simon
- (Belgium) Yannick Vandenbulcke

The following players received entry as lucky losers:

- (Russia) Shalva Dzhanashia
- (Germany) Mats Rosenkranz
- (Ukraine) Volodymyr Uzhylovskyi

== Champions ==
=== Singles ===
- (Germany) Yannick Hanfmann def. (Italy) Lorenzo Sonego 6–4, 3–6, 7–5.

=== Doubles ===
- (Croatia) Marin Draganja / (Croatia) Tomislav Draganja def. (Germany) Dustin Brown / (Germany) Tim Pütz 6–7^{(1–7)}, 6–2, [10–8].
