= 2023 Wolffkran Open =

- Date: 30 October – 5 November
- Edition: 7th
- Surface: Carpet (indoor)
- Location: Ismaning, Germany

Champions

Singles
- (Switzerland) Antoine Bellier

Doubles
- (India) Sriram Balaji / (Germany) Andre Begemann
- Wolffkran Open

The 2023 Wolffkran Open was a professional tennis tournament played on carpet courts. It was the seventh edition of the tournament which was part of the 2023 ATP Challenger Tour. It took place in Ismaning, Germany between 30 October and 5 November 2023.

== Singles main draw entrants ==
=== Seeds ===
Country	Player	Rank^{1}	Seed
SUI	Dominic Stricker	96	1
GER	Maximilian Marterer	106	2
USA	Maxime Cressy	113	3
~~RSA~~	~~Lloyd Harris~~	~~141~~	~~4~~
BIH	Damir Džumhur	151	5
GBR	Jan Choinski	152	6
UKR	Vitaliy Sachko	166	7
SUI	Marc-Andrea Hüsler	174	8
FRA	Harold Mayot	178	9

- ^{1} Rankings are as of 23 October 2023.

=== Other entrants ===
The following players received wildcards into the singles main draw:

- (Germany) Daniel Masur
- (Germany) Max Hans Rehberg
- (Germany) Marko Topo

The following players received entry into the singles main draw as alternates:

- (France) Mathias Bourgue
- Alibek Kachmazov

The following players received entry from the qualifying draw:

- (Switzerland) Antoine Bellier
- (Czech Republic) Andrew Paulson
- (Germany) Mats Rosenkranz
- (Portugal) João Sousa
- (Germany) Louis Wessels
- (Poland) Kacper Żuk

The following player received entry as a lucky loser:

- (Romania) Marius Copil

== Champions ==
=== Singles ===
- (Switzerland) Antoine Bellier def. (Germany) Maximilian Marterer 7–6^{(7–5)}, 6–7^{(5–7)}, 7–6^{(8–6)}.

=== Doubles ===
- (India) Sriram Balaji / (Germany) Andre Begemann def. (Germany) Constantin Frantzen / (Germany) Hendrik Jebens 7–6^{(7–4)}, 6–4.
