= 2022 Wolffkran Open – Singles =

Singles
- 2022 Wolffkran Open

Final
- Champion: (France) Quentin Halys
- Runner-up: (Germany) Max Hans Rehberg
- Score: 7–6^{(8–6)}, 6–3

Events
Singles	Doubles
- Wolffkran Open

Oscar Otte was the defending champion but chose not to defend his title.

Quentin Halys won the title after defeating Max Hans Rehberg 7–6^{(8–6)}, 6–3 in the final.

== Seeds ==
1. (France) Quentin Halys (champion)
2. (Czech Republic) Tomáš Macháč (first round)
3. (Canada) Vasek Pospisil (semifinals)
4. (Austria) Dennis Novak (first round)
5. (Germany) Daniel Masur (second round)
6. (Switzerland) Antoine Bellier (first round)
7. (Bosnia and Herzegovina) Nerman Fatić (second round)
8. (France) Antoine Escoffier (first round)

== Draw ==
Key

- Q = Qualifier
- WC = Wild card
- LL = Lucky loser
- Alt = Alternate
- ITF = ITF entry
- PR = Protected ranking
- SR = Special ranking
- SE = Special exempt
- JE = Junior exempt
- JR = Junior Accelerator Programme entrant
- CO = College Accelerator Programme entrant
- NG = Next Gen Accelerator Program entrant
- w/o = Walkover
- r = Retired
- d = Defaulted

=== Finals ===
Semifinals
1	(France) Quentin Halys	7^{7}	7^{7}
Q	(Poland) Kacper Żuk	6^{5}	6^{4}
3	(Canada) Vasek Pospisil	4	6^{2}
WC	(Germany) Max Hans Rehberg	6	7^{7}

Final
1	(France) Quentin Halys	7^{8}	6
WC	(Germany) Max Hans Rehberg	6^{6}	3

=== Top half ===
First round
1	(France) Q Halys	7^{10}	6
(Belgium) M Geerts	6^{8}	4
(India) R Ramanathan	7^{7}	6^{5}	7^{7}
Q	(United Kingdom) B Harris	6^{4}	7^{7}	6^{5}
(United Kingdom) A Gray	6	6
(Slovakia) F Horanský	3	4
Q	(Germany) J Lenz	5	3
7	(Bosnia and Herzegovina) N Fatić	7	6
4	(Austria) D Novak	6^{5}	6^{4}
(Kazakhstan) D Yevseyev	7^{7}	7^{7}
Q	(China) Y Bu	7^{7}	6
(Lebanon) B Hassan	6^{2}	2
Q	(Germany) M Bachinger	0	6	4
(Brazil) G Décamps	6	1	6
Q	(Poland) K Żuk	6	3	6
8	(France) A Escoffier	4	6	4

Second round
1	(France) Q Halys	7^{7}	3	7
(India) R Ramanathan	6^{2}	6	5
(United Kingdom) A Gray	7^{7}	6
7	(Bosnia and Herzegovina) N Fatić	6^{3}	1
(Kazakhstan) D Yevseyev	6	7^{7}
Q	(China) Y Bu	1	6^{5}
(Brazil) G Décamps	1	4
Q	(Poland) K Żuk	6	6

Quarterfinals
1	(France) Q Halys	6	6^{3}	7^{7}
(United Kingdom) A Gray	4	7^{7}	6^{4}
(Kazakhstan) D Yevseyev	4	6	3
Q	(Poland) K Żuk	6	3	6

Semifinals
1	(France) Q Halys	7^{7}	7^{7}
Q	(Poland) K Żuk	6^{5}	6^{4}

=== Bottom half ===
First round
5	(Germany) D Masur	6	6
Alt	E Karlovskiy	4	3
(Germany) M Moraing	2	4
Alt	(Ukraine) V Sachko	6	6
WC	(Germany) M Topo	2	6	3
(Czech Republic) J Forejtek	6	3	6
WC	(Germany) P Florig	3	2
3	(Canada) V Pospisil	6	6
6	(Switzerland) A Bellier	7	6^{3}	3
Q	(Germany) Elmar Ejupovic	5	7^{7}	6
(Slovakia) L Klein	6	6
(Finland) O Virtanen	1	4
(Czech Republic) Z Kolář	4	6^{6}
(Netherlands) R Haase	6	7^{8}
WC	(Germany) MH Rehberg	6	6
2	(Czech Republic) T Macháč	3	4

Second round
5	(Germany) D Masur	1	7^{7}	3
Alt	(Ukraine) V Sachko	6	6^{3}	6
(Czech Republic) J Forejtek	6^{5}	4
3	(Canada) V Pospisil	7^{7}	6
Q	(Germany) E Ejupovic	3	6	7
(Slovakia) L Klein	6	3	5
(Netherlands) R Haase	3	6^{7}
WC	(Germany) MH Rehberg	6	7^{9}

Quarterfinals
Alt	(Ukraine) V Sachko	3	0^{r}
3	(Canada) V Pospisil	6	1
Q	(Germany) E Ejupovic	6^{8}	6^{4}
WC	(Germany) MH Rehberg	7^{10}	7^{7}

Semifinals
3	(Canada) V Pospisil	4	6^{2}
WC	(Germany) MH Rehberg	6	7^{7}
