= 2018 Wolffkran Open – Singles =

Singles
- 2018 Wolffkran Open

Final
- Champion: (Italy) Filippo Baldi
- Runner-up: (France) Gleb Sakharov
- Score: 6–4, 6–4

Events
Singles	Doubles
- Wolffkran Open

Defending champion Yannick Hanfmann chose not to defend his title.

Filippo Baldi won the title after defeating Gleb Sakharov 6–4, 6–4 in the final.

== Seeds ==
1. (Italy) Lorenzo Sonego (first round)
2. (France) Ugo Humbert (semifinals)
3. (Argentina) Marco Trungelliti (first round)
4. (Italy) Stefano Travaglia (second round)
5. (Austria) Dennis Novak (first round)
6. (France) Grégoire Barrère (second round)
7. (France) Quentin Halys (first round)
8. (Austria) Lucas Miedler (first round)

== Draw ==
Key

- Q = Qualifier
- WC = Wild card
- LL = Lucky loser
- Alt = Alternate
- ITF = ITF entry
- PR = Protected ranking
- SR = Special ranking
- SE = Special exempt
- JE = Junior exempt
- JR = Junior Accelerator Programme entrant
- CO = College Accelerator Programme entrant
- NG = Next Gen Accelerator Program entrant
- w/o = Walkover
- r = Retired
- d = Defaulted

=== Finals ===
Semifinals
Q	(Germany) Johannes Härteis	4	2
(France) Gleb Sakharov	6	6
(Italy) Filippo Baldi	6	7
2/SE	(France) Ugo Humbert	4	5

Final
(France) Gleb Sakharov	4	4
(Italy) Filippo Baldi	6	6

=== Top half ===
First round
1	(Italy) L Sonego	7	4	4
(Argentina) P Cachin	5	6	6
(Germany) D Masur	7^{8}	6
(Spain) B Zapata Miralles	6^{6}	3
Q	(Austria) A Erler	3	4
Q	(Slovakia) L Klein	6	6
Q	(Germany) J Härteis	0	7^{7}	7
5	(Austria) D Novak	6	6^{5}	5
4	(Italy) S Travaglia	7	6
(Bosnia and Herzegovina) T Brkić	5	3
(France) G Sakharov	6	6
(Spain) R Ojeda Lara	3	1
WC	(Germany) Jeremy Jahn	6	1
(Germany) D Brown	1	0^{r}
WC	(Germany) L Wessels	7^{12}	6
8	(Austria) L Miedler	6^{10}	3

Second round
(Argentina) P Cachin	2	2
(Germany) D Masur	6	6
Q	(Slovakia) L Klein	3	6	5
Q	(Germany) J Härteis	6	4	7
4	(Italy) S Travaglia	6	4	4
(France) G Sakharov	3	6	6
WC	(Germany) J Jahn	7^{7}	6
WC	(Germany) L Wessels	6^{5}	4

Quarterfinals
(Germany) D Masur	5	3
Q	(Germany) J Härteis	7	6
(France) G Sakharov	6	3	6
WC	(Germany) J Jahn	3	6	3

Semifinals
Q	(Germany) J Härteis	4	2
(France) G Sakharov	6	6

=== Bottom half ===
First round
6/SE	(France) G Barrère	7^{7}	6
WC	(Germany) Kai Lemstra	6^{5}	3
(Lithuania) L Grigelis	4	6^{4}
(Germany) K Krawietz	6	7^{7}
(Belgium) Christopher Heyman	5	6	4
(France) B Bonzi	7	4	6
(Italy) F Baldi	6	6
3	(Argentina) M Trungelliti	3	4
7	(France) Q Halys	7^{8}	3	6^{3}
(United Kingdom) J Ward	6^{6}	6	7^{7}
(Czech Republic) V Šafránek	4	2
(Italy) M Viola	6	6
(Italy) G Mager	6^{5}	6^{5}
WC	(Germany) C Seraphim	7^{7}	7^{7}
Q	(France) T Lamasine	6^{1}	3
2/SE	(France) U Humbert	7^{7}	6

Second round
6/SE	(France) G Barrère	7	5	6^{4}
(Germany) K Krawietz	5	7	7^{7}
(France) B Bonzi	6^{4}	6	6^{4}
(Italy) F Baldi	7^{7}	2	7^{7}
(United Kingdom) J Ward	5	6	6^{3}
(Italy) M Viola	7	1	7^{7}
WC	(Germany) C Seraphim	3	4
2/SE	(France) U Humbert	6	6

Quarterfinals
(Germany) K Krawietz	6	2	4
(Italy) F Baldi	4	6	6
(Italy) M Viola	1	2
2/SE	(France) U Humbert	6	6

Semifinals
(Italy) F Baldi	6	7
2/SE	(France) U Humbert	4	5
