= Wolffkran =

German-Swiss tower crane manufacturer

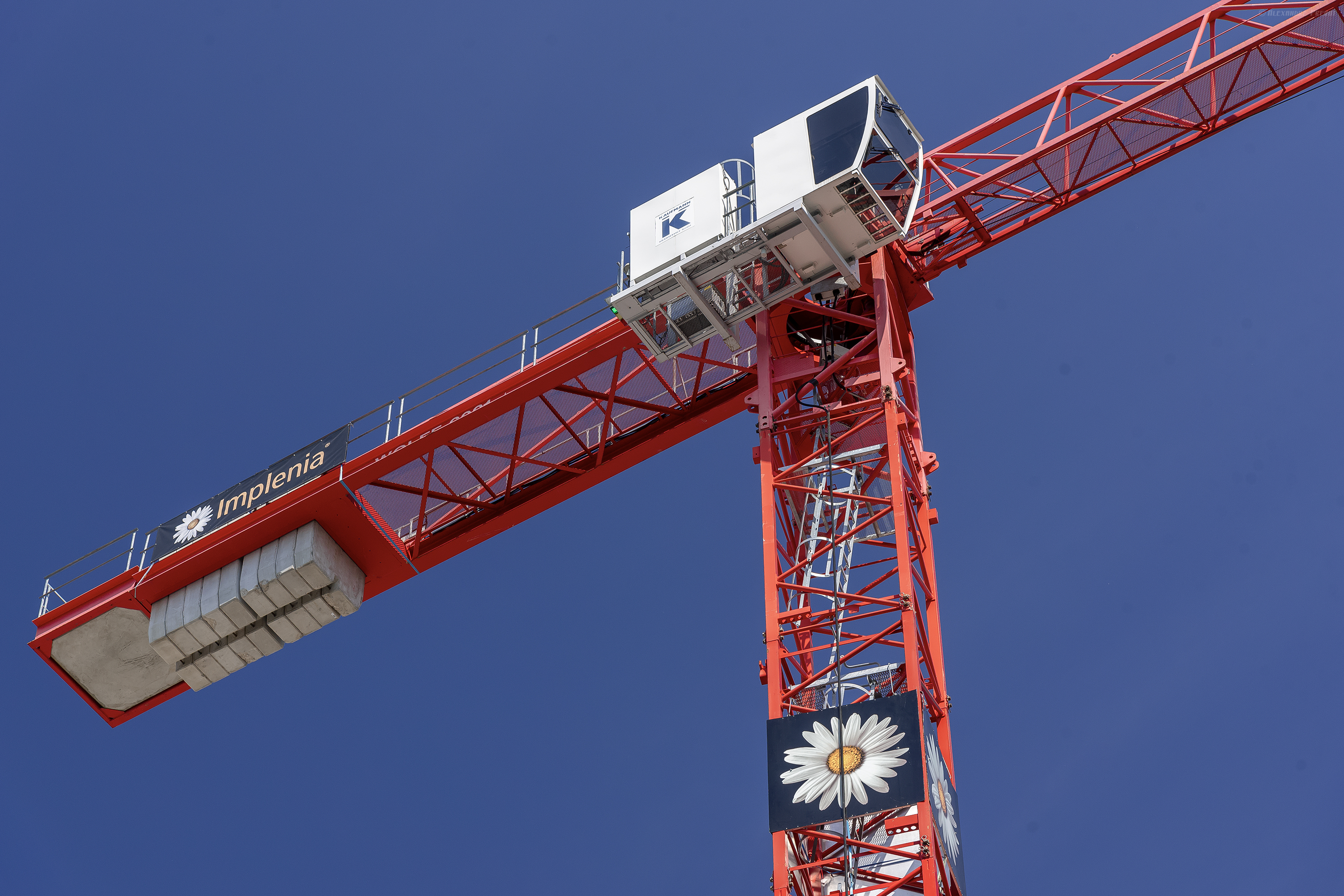
- Wolff 6031 Clear tower crane
- Type: Private (AG)
- Industry: Construction equipment
- Founded: 1854; 172 years ago in Heilbronn, Germany
- Founder: Friedrich August Wolff
- Headquarters: Baar, Switzerland
- Key people: Duncan Salt (CEO); Peter Schiefer (Owner)
- Products: Tower cranes
- Website: wolffkran.com

Wolffkran (stylised as WOLFFKRAN) is a German-Swiss tower crane manufacturer and rental company. Founded in 1854 in Heilbronn, Germany, the company developed an early tower crane design in the early 20th century. In 1913, the company received a gold medal at the Leipzig Trade Fair for its tower crane design. By the outbreak of World War II, Wolff had become a major manufacturer of medium and heavy tower cranes in the 40 to 150 metre range.

Headquartered in Baar, Switzerland, Wolffkran operates manufacturing facilities in Germany and maintains an international crane rental fleet. The company ranked eight globally in the 2025 International Cranes and Specialized Transport Tower Index, down from seventh in 2021.

== History ==
=== Founding and early years (1854–1910) ===
The company was founded on 19 August 1854 by Friedrich August Wolff (1799–1858), a Heilbronn pewterer and master craftsman, as an iron foundry. After Friedrich August Wolff's death in 1858, the business was divided between his two sons: the elder, Karl Friedrich Wolff, continued the pewter and pharmaceutical apparatus business, while the younger, Julius Wolff, took over the iron foundry and machine works.

Under Julius Wolff, the company—known as Julius Wolff & Co.—diversified into general mechanical engineering, producing steam engines, road rollers, calenders for paper manufacturing, and various iron components including ship bollards and lamp posts. By 1898, the company was producing hand-operated slewing cranes with optional electric drives for industrial use.

=== Development of the tower crane (1910–1913) ===
In 1897, the company received a patent for a safety brake system. A pivotal development came in 1908 when engineer Gottlob Göbel joined the company as chief engineer. Between 1908 and 1910, Göbel developed what Engineering News-Record describes as "the first modern tower crane"—a small, rail-mounted unit that could be assembled on site.

Göbel's key innovation was a crane that could be assembled lying flat on the ground and then raised using its own electric winch, reducing typical assembly times from ten to fourteen days by more than half. He also designed a rotating top section mounted over a fixed tower tip, with the jib connected by bolts—the basic configuration still used in modern tower cranes.

On 3 May 1913, Wolff presented a larger model at the International Building Trade Exhibition at the Leipzig Trade Fair, which was opened that day by the King of Saxony. The Leipzig Tagblatt newspaper reported on the crane under the headline "Revolutionary Development in Construction Technology". The company was awarded a gold medal by the Leipzig Trade Fair "for their technical brilliance". Contemporary records indicate the crane was erected in four days, which was notably fast for that era.

=== Interwar period and market leadership (1913–1945) ===
Following the Leipzig exhibition, Göbel continued development, constructing a crane with three independent electric motors allowing simultaneous travel, hoisting, and slewing. By 1917, Wolff was offering tower cranes in heavy-duty configurations.

During the 1920s, Wolff tower cranes became central to the rationalisation movement on large construction sites in Germany. In 1928, the company introduced the first tower crane with a trolley jib (Katzausleger), allowing horizontal load movement along the jib via an electric trolley—a design that became known as the hammerhead configuration.

Wolff cranes were used on numerous major construction projects during this period, including the United States Embassy in Paris, the Reichsbank headquarters in Frankfurt, and the Little Belt Bridge (1934).

In 1938, crane manufacturing had become the company's primary business, and the name "Wolffkran" was formally adopted.

=== MAN ownership (1953–2005) ===
In 1953, MAN Group acquired a 51% stake in Julius Wolff & Co. GmbH. MAN increased its stake to 100% in 1977, and the company became known as MAN Wolffkran.

During the MAN period, the company introduced several technical innovations. In 1963, Wolffkran developed a pin connection system (Schlagbolzenverbindung) for tower sections, replacing traditional bolted or riveted connections with a faster method using pins secured with split pins or spring clips. This modular technology allowed faster assembly without heavy torque wrenches. In 1973, the company introduced a modular system allowing cranes to be configured from standardised components for specific applications. In 1989, Wolffkran became the first tower crane manufacturer to use a frequency-converter-controlled hoist drive, allowing stepless speed control.

In January 2005, MAN sold Wolffkran to a private German-Swiss investment consortium led by Dr Peter Schiefer and Dr Hans-Peter Koller. At the time of sale, the company had approximately 200 employees and annual sales of €35 million. Following the buyout, the corporate headquarters were moved to Switzerland while manufacturing remained in Germany.

=== International expansion (2005–present) ===
Under new ownership, the company pursued international expansion. In 2007, Wolffkran established a joint venture called Wolffkran Arabia with Kanoo Machinery to serve the United Arab Emirates market. At this time, the company reported turnover of approximately €48 million and employed around 300 people.

In 2008, Wolffkran opened a second manufacturing facility in Luckau, Brandenburg, its first new production site in over a century.

In May 2015, Wolffkran acquired HTC Plant Ltd, a major tower crane rental company in the United Kingdom. The acquisition added over 200 tower cranes to Wolffkran's rental fleet, 370 employees, and revenues exceeding £40 million annually. The UK operation was rebranded as Wolffkran Ltd in 2020.

In 2019, Duncan Salt was appointed chief executive, succeeding Peter Schiefer who remained as owner and board member.

The company continued expanding through acquisitions, purchasing Czech crane rental company Konstruktiva Lokus in 2021 and taking full ownership of its Norwegian joint venture Wolffkran Norge in 2024.

In February 2024, Wolffkran announced a joint venture with Saudi Arabia's Zamil Group to establish a tower crane manufacturing facility in Dammam, the company's first production site outside Germany.

In 2026, Wolffkran-employed crane operators in the UK represented by Unite voted to go on strike, citing stagnant wage. The strike began on January 27, 2026.

== Operations ==
Wolffkran manufactures tower cranes at two facilities in Germany: its original plant in Heilbronn and a facility in Luckau, Brandenburg. The company's international headquarters are located in Baar in the canton of Zug, Switzerland.

The company operates subsidiaries and joint ventures in multiple countries including Austria, France, Belgium, Switzerland, the United Kingdom, the United States, the United Arab Emirates, the Czech Republic, and Norway.

The company also operates WOLFF Onsite, a UK lifting accessories division, which was shortlisted for Excellence in Product Innovation and Sustainability Excellence at the 2024 LEEA Awards.

== Products and technology ==
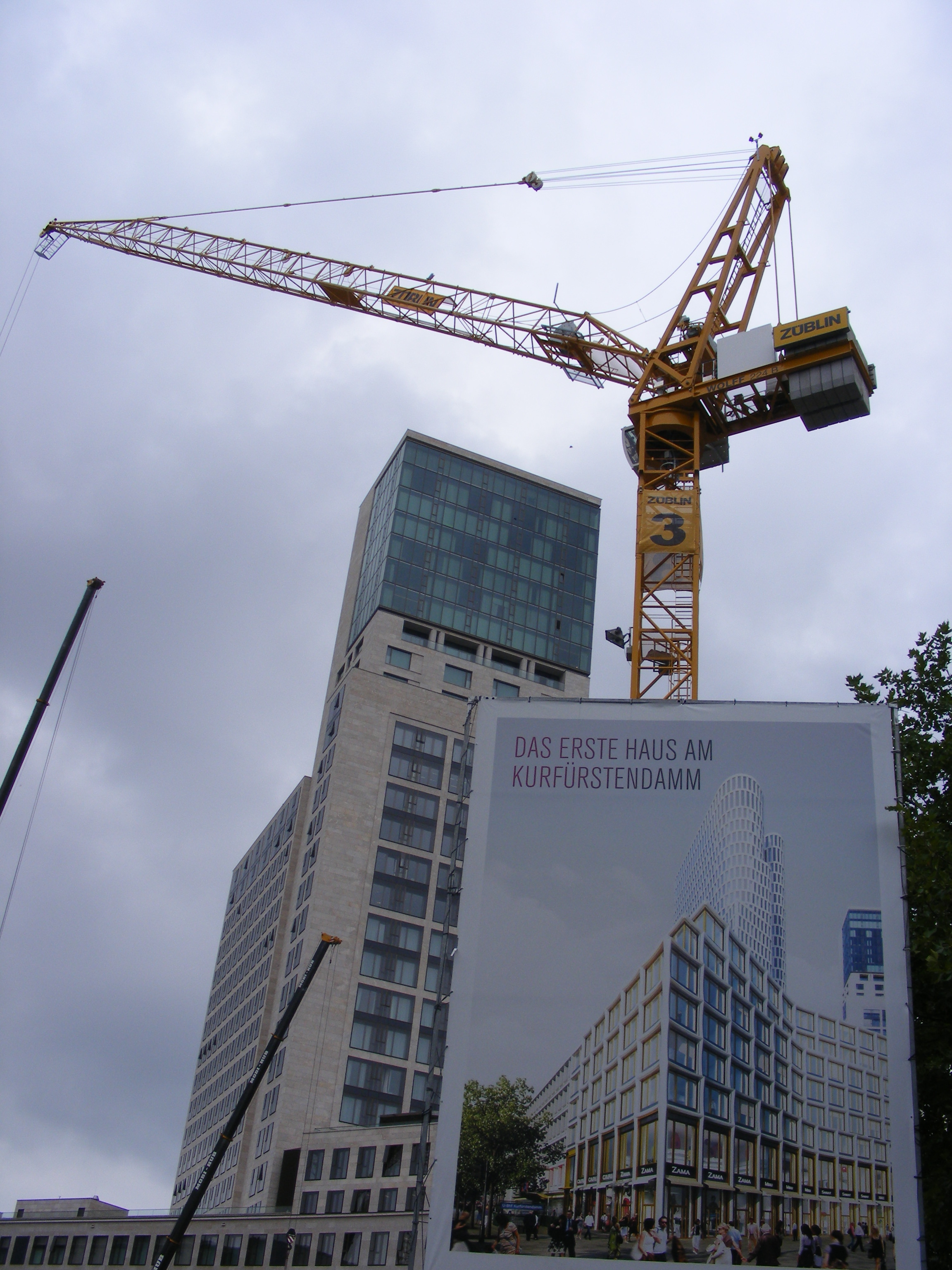
Wolff 224 B luffing jib crane in Berlin

Wolffkran produces two main categories of tower crane:

- Trolley jib cranes — including the WOLFF clear (flat-top/topless) and WOLFF cross (with conventional tower head) series
- Luffing jib cranes — the WOLFF B series (e.g., Wolff 355 B, 700 B), designed for confined urban sites where jib oversail is restricted

The company's luffing jib cranes are widely used in dense urban environments such as the City of London, where "rights to light" and oversailing regulations restrict the use of conventional horizontal jib cranes.

In 2022, the company launched the WOLFF FX series of flat-top cranes.

Recent technological developments include HiSPS (High-Speed Positioning System), an electronic assistance system that automates load sway dampening for faster load positioning, and research into high-performance synthetic fibre ropes as an alternative to steel cables.

== Notable projects ==
=== Three World Trade Center ===
In 2015, a Wolff 700 B luffing crane became the first Wolffkran tower crane to operate in New York City, deployed on the construction of Three World Trade Center. The project won Engineering News-Record's Best Project award in 2018, which noted that "a crane from the German company WOLFFKRAN was used because it was able to fit within tight constraints."

=== Grand Mosque expansion, Mecca ===
Wolffkran supplied 44 tower cranes for the third expansion of the Grand Mosque in Mecca, Saudi Arabia. Industry sources reported the company ultimately had over 100 cranes deployed on various phases of the mosque expansion project.

=== Jeddah Tower ===
Wolffkran supplies tower cranes for the construction of Jeddah Tower in Saudi Arabia, intended to become the world's tallest building upon completion. The project utilises "pack" configurations of Wolff 1250 B and 630 B cranes designed to climb within the building's elevator shafts to heights exceeding 1,000 metres.

=== Roche Tower, Basel ===
Wolff tower cranes were used in the construction of Roche Building 1 in Basel, Switzerland. The project employed a WOLFF 7532.16 saddle jib crane that reached a hook height of 669 feet (204 metres), described as "Switzerland's tallest construction crane" at that time.

=== Tottenham Hotspur Stadium ===
Wolff luffing jib cranes were deployed on the construction of Tottenham Hotspur Stadium in London. The project used WOLFF 335 B cranes operated by HTC Wolffkran (now Wolffkran Ltd).

== Incidents ==
In July 2020, a Wolff 355 B luffing crane collapsed at a construction site in Bow, London. The accident resulted in the death of June Harvey, 85, a resident in an adjacent property, and injuries to four others. The crane had been erected the day before on a housing development site owned by Swan Housing Association.

A joint investigation by the Metropolitan Police and Health and Safety Executive focused on why the crane's foundations failed. In 2023, the victim's family filed a civil lawsuit against Swan Housing Association and consulting engineer PGCS Partnership, alleging that concrete foundation pads for the crane were constructed with inadequate steel reinforcement. Wolffkran was not named in the lawsuit.
