= 2020 Wolffkran Open =

- Date: 19 – 25 October
- Edition: 4th
- Surface: Carpet
- Location: Ismaning, Germany

Champions

Singles
- (Switzerland) Marc-Andrea Hüsler

Doubles
- (Germany) Andre Begemann / (Netherlands) David Pel
- Wolffkran Open

The 2020 Wolffkran Open was a professional tennis tournament played on carpet courts. It was the fourth edition of the tournament which was part of the 2020 ATP Challenger Tour. It took place in Ismaning, Germany between 19 and 25 October 2020.

== Singles main draw entrants ==
=== Seeds ===
| Country | Player | Rank^{1} | Seed |
|---|---|---|---|
| ARG | Federico Delbonis | 78 | 1 |
| GER | Yannick Hanfmann | 101 | 2 |
| FRA | Grégoire Barrère | 106 | 3 |
| FRA | Antoine Hoang | 130 | 4 |
| USA | Sebastian Korda | 131 | 5 |
| SUI | Henri Laaksonen | 139 | 6 |
| IND | Prajnesh Gunneswaran | 149 | 7 |
| PER | Juan Pablo Varillas | 150 | 8 |

- ^{1} Rankings are as of 12 October 2020.

=== Other entrants ===
The following players received wildcards into the singles main draw:

- (Germany) Maximilian Marterer
- (Germany) Max Hans Rehberg
- (Germany) Mats Rosenkranz

The following player received entry into the singles main draw using a protected ranking:

- (Germany) Dustin Brown

The following players received entry from the qualifying draw:

- (Argentina) Tomás Martín Etcheverry
- (Germany) Julian Lenz
- (Germany) Daniel Masur
- (Austria) Lucas Miedler

== Champions ==
=== Singles ===
- (Switzerland) Marc-Andrea Hüsler def. (Netherlands) Botic van de Zandschulp 6–7^{(3–7)}, 7–6^{(7–2)}, 7–5.

=== Doubles ===
- (Germany) Andre Begemann / (Netherlands) David Pel def. (United Kingdom) Lloyd Glasspool / (United States) Alex Lawson 5–7, 7–6^{(7–2)}, [10–4].
