= David Pel =

Dutch tennis player (born 1991)

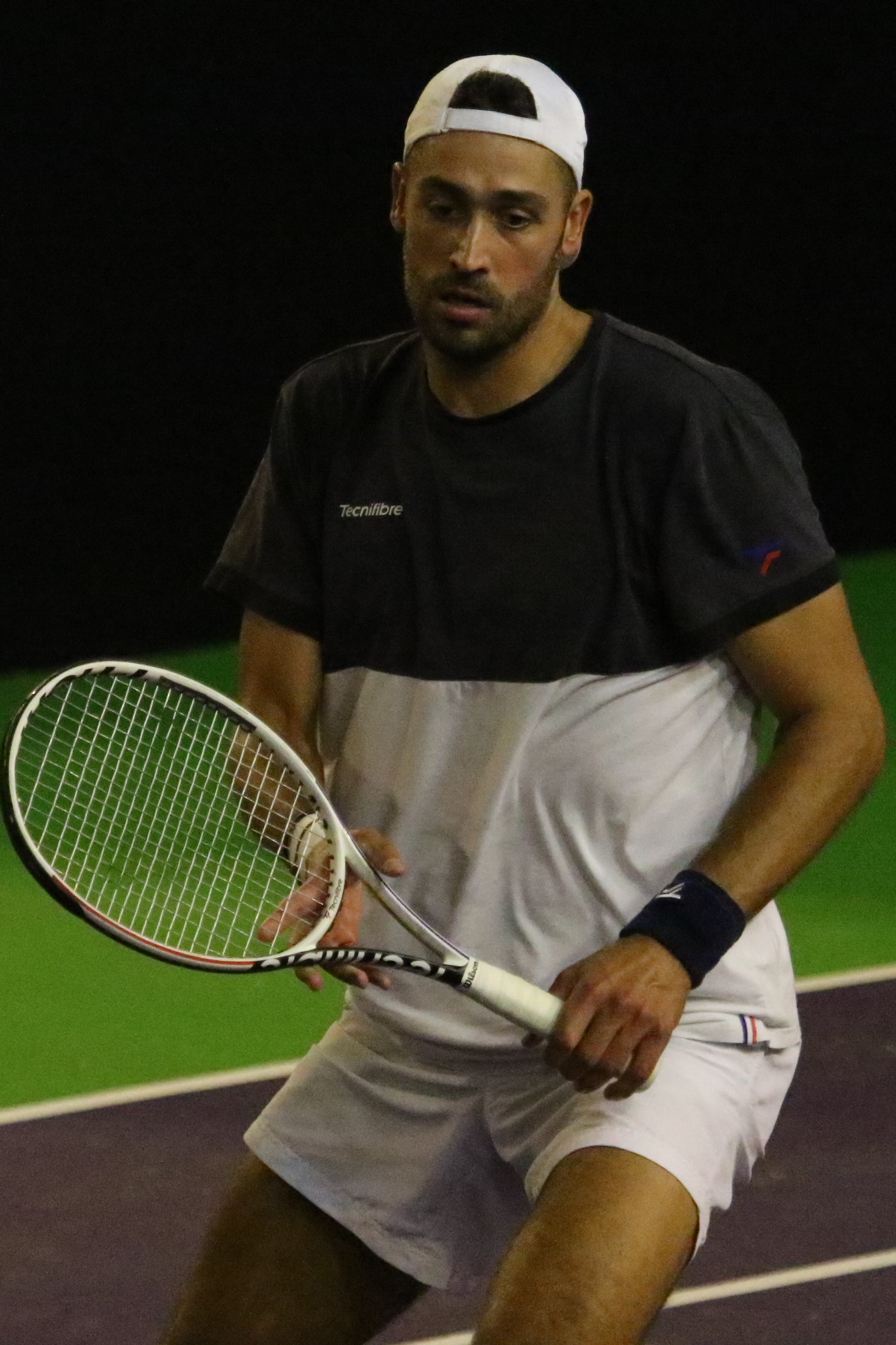
- Pel in 2021
- Country (sports): Netherlands
- Residence: Aalsmeer, Netherlands
- Born: 9 July 1991 (age 35) Amstelveen, Netherlands
- Height: 1.98 m (6 ft 6 in)
- Plays: Left-handed (two-handed backhand)
- Coach: Marc Duncker, Dennis van Scheppingen (2014-2021), Robert Jan Luttikhuis
- Prize money: US $917,641

Singles
- Career record: 0-0
- Career titles: 0
- Highest ranking: No. 885 (1 May 2017)

Doubles
- Career record: 55–69 (at ATP Tour level, Grand Slam level, and in Davis Cup)
- Career titles: 2
- Highest ranking: No. 21 (22 June 2026)
- Current ranking: No. 21 (22 June 2026)

Grand Slam doubles results
- Australian Open: 2R (2026)
- French Open: QF (2026)
- Wimbledon: F (2025)
- US Open: 1R (2023, 2025, 2026)

Grand Slam mixed doubles results
- Australian Open: 1R (2026)
- French Open: 1R (2026)
- Wimbledon: 1R (2021, 2026)
- Last updated on: 22 June 2026.

David Pel (born 9 July 1991) is a Dutch tennis player who specializes in doubles. He has a career high ATP doubles ranking of world No. 21 achieved on 22 June 2026 and a singles ranking of No. 885 achieved on 1 May 2017. Pel was a Grand Slam finalist at 2025 Wimbledon with Rinky Hijikata. He has won two doubles ATP titles.

Pel competes mainly on the ATP Challenger Tour and ITF Men's circuit where he has a 19–16 win-loss record in Challenger finals and a 11–12 record in ITF career doubles finals.

== Career ==
=== 2017: ATP debut ===
Pel made his ATP main draw debut at the 2017 Ricoh Open in the doubles draw partnering Tallon Griekspoor. They were defeated by Santiago González and Adil Shamasdin in the first round.

=== 2021: First ATP doubles title ===
Partnering Sander Arends, he won his maiden ATP doubles title at the 2021 Swedish Open, defeating Andre Begemann and Albano Olivetti in the final.

=== 2025: Wimbledon finalist, top 30 in doubles ===
At the 2025 Wimbledon Championships Pel reached the final with Rinky Hijikata as alternate pair, defeating third seeds Kevin Krawietz and Tim Putz and top seeds and world No. 1 duo Marcelo Arevalo and Mate Pavic en route. They lost the championship match to fifth seeds Julian Cash and Lloyd Glasspool.

== Performance timeline ==
Key
W	F	SF	QF	#R	RR	Q#	DNQ	A	NH

(W) winner; (F) finalist; (SF) semifinalist; (QF) quarterfinalist; (#R) rounds 4, 3, 2, 1; (RR) round-robin stage; (Q#) qualification round; (DNQ) did not qualify; (A) absent; (NH) not held; (SR) strike rate (events won / competed); (W–L) win–loss record.

=== Doubles ===
Tournament	2021	2022	2023	2024	2025	2026	SR	W–L	Win %
Grand Slams
Australian Open	A	A	A	A	1R	2R	0 / 2	1–2	33%
French Open	1R	A	A	1R	2R	QF	0 / 4	4–4	50%
Wimbledon	1R	A	3R	A	F		0 / 3	7–3	70%
US Open	A	A	1R	A	1R		0 / 2	0–2	0%
Win–loss	0–2	0–0	1–2	0–1	6–4	4–2	0 / 11	12–11	52%
ATP Masters 1000
Indian Wells Masters	A	A	A	A	A	1R	0 / 1	0–1	0%
Miami Open	A	A	A	A	A	2R	0 / 1	1–1	50%
Monte Carlo Masters	A	A	A	A	A	A	0 / 0	0–0	–
Madrid Open	A	A	A	A	A	1R	0 / 1	0–1	0%
Italian Open	A	A	A	A	A	1R	0 / 1	0–1	0%
Canadian Open	A	A	A	A	A		0 / 0	0–0	–
Cincinnati Masters	A	A	A	A	1R		0 / 1	0–1	0%
Shanghai Masters	NH		A	A	QF		0 / 1	2–1	67%
Paris Masters	A	A	A	A	1R		0 / 1	0–1	0%
Win–loss	0–0	0–0	0–0	0–0	2–3	1–4	0 / 7	3–7	30%

== Grand Slam tournament finals ==
=== Doubles: 1 (1 runner-up) ===
Result	Year	Tournament	Surface	Partner	Opponents	Score
Loss	2025	Wimbledon	Grass	(Australia) Rinky Hijikata	(United Kingdom) Julian Cash (United Kingdom) Lloyd Glasspool	2–6, 6–7^{(3–7)}

== ATP career finals ==
=== Doubles: 8 (2 titles, 6 runner-ups) ===
Legend Grand Slam tournaments (0–1) ATP World Tour Finals (0–0) ATP World Tour Masters 1000 (0–0) ATP World Tour 500 Series (0–1) ATP World Tour 250 Series (2–4)	Titles by surface Hard (0–5) Clay (1–0) Grass (1–1)	Titles by setting Outdoor (2–4) Indoor (0–2)

Result	W–L	Date	Tournament	Tier	Surface	Partner	Opponents	Score
Loss	0–1	Mar 2021	Open 13, France	250 Series	Hard (i)	(Netherlands) Sander Arends	(United Kingdom) Lloyd Glasspool (Finland) Harri Heliövaara	5–7, 6–7^{(4–7)}
Win	1–1	Jul 2021	Swedish Open, Sweden	250 Series	Clay	(Netherlands) Sander Arends	(Germany) Andre Begemann (France) Albano Olivetti	6–4, 6–2
Loss	1–2	Jul 2025	Wimbledon Championships, United Kingdom	Grand Slam	Grass	(Australia) Rinky Hijikata	(United Kingdom) Julian Cash (United Kingdom) Lloyd Glasspool	2–6, 6–7^{(3–7)}
Loss	1–3	Sep 2025	Hangzhou Open, China	250 Series	Hard	(Colombia) Nicolás Barrientos	(Portugal) Francisco Cabral (Austria) Lucas Miedler	4-6, 4–6
Loss	1–4	Nov 2025	Hellenic Championship, Greece	250 Series	Hard (i)	(Mexico) Santiago González	(Portugal) Francisco Cabral (Austria) Lucas Miedler	6–4, 3–6, [3–10]
Win	2–4	Jun 2026	Rosmalen Open, Netherlands	250 Series	Grass	(Netherlands) Sander Arends	(Belgium) Zizou Bergs (France) Arthur Rinderknech	7–6^{(8–6)}, 7–6^{(7–5)}
Loss	2–5	Sep 2026	Hangzhou Open, China	250 Series	Hard	(Netherlands) Sander Arends	(Portugal) Francisco Cabral (United States) JJ Tracy	5–7, 4–6
Loss	2–6	Oct 2026	China Open, China	500 Series	Hard	(Netherlands) Sander Arends	(United Kingdom) Julian Cash (United Kingdom) Lloyd Glasspool	3–6, 6–3, [6–10]

== ATP Challenger and ITF Tour finals ==
=== Doubles: 64 (33–31) ===
Legend (doubles) ATP Challenger Tour (22–19) ITF Futures Tour (11–12)	Titles by surface Hard (17–17) Clay (15–10) Grass (0–0) Carpet (1–4)

Result	W–L	Date	Tournament	Tier	Surface	Partner	Opponents	Score
Loss	0–1	Mar 2011	Switzerland F1, Fällanden	Futures	Carpet (i)	(Belgium) Gaëtan de Lovinfosse	(Germany) Nils Langer (Austria) Marc Rath	3–6, 6–7^{(5–7)}
Loss	0–2	Aug 2013	Poland F1, Ślęza	Futures	Hard	(Netherlands) Jeroen Benard	(Germany) Stefan Seifert (Germany) Torsten Wietoska	4–6, 7–6^{(7–4)}, [6–10]
Loss	0–3	Oct 2013	Great Britain F20, Sunderland	Futures	Hard (i)	(India) Vijay Sundar Prashanth	(United Kingdom) Josh Goodall (United Kingdom) Harry Meehan	3–6, 6–4, [8–10]
Win	1–3	Jul 2014	Austria F5, Bad Waltersdorf	Futures	Clay	(Czech Republic) Jan Blecha	(Austria) Mario Haider-Maurer (Czech Republic) Jan Poskocil	6–4, 6–1
Win	2–3	Aug 2014	Germany F10, Wetzlar	Futures	Clay	(Netherlands) Dennis van Scheppingen	(Germany) Julian Lenz (Germany) Lars Pörschke	7–6^{(7–2)}, 7–6^{(7–5)}
Loss	2–4	May 2015	Spain F10, Vic	Futures	Clay	(France) Maxime Tabatruong	(Spain) Sergio Martos Gornés (Spain) Pol Toledo Bagué	6–3, 6–7^{(7–4)}, [15–17]
Loss	2–5	May 2015	Italy F12, Lecco	Futures	Clay	(France) Maxime Tabatruong	(Australia) Peter Luczak (Australia) Marc Polmans	4–6, 2–6
Win	3–5	Oct 2015	Germany F17, Oberhaching	Futures	Hard (i)	(Netherlands) Niels Lootsma	(Germany) Johannes Härteis (Germany) Hannes Wagner	2–6, 6–4, [10–8]
Win	4–5	Dec 2015	Nigeria F3, Lagos	Futures	Hard	(Netherlands) Antal van der Duim	(South Africa) Lloyd Harris (Egypt) Karim-Mohamed Maamoun	6–3, 6–2
Loss	4–6	Dec 2015	Nigeria F4, Lagos	Futures	Hard	(Netherlands) Antal van der Duim	(South Africa) Lloyd Harris (Egypt) Karim-Mohamed Maamoun	5–7, 6–7^{(6–8)}
Loss	4–7	Mar 2016	France F4, Lille	Futures	Hard (i)	(Netherlands) Antal van der Duim	(Russia) Denis Matsukevitch (Russia) Daniil Medvedev	6–7^{(5–7)}, 6–4, [9–11]
Win	5–7	Mar 2016	Italy F2, Basiglio	Futures	Hard (i)	(Netherlands) Antal van der Duim	(France) Antoine Hoang (France) Grégoire Jacq	6–4, 6–4
Win	6–7	Apr 2016	Nigeria F2, Abuja	Futures	Hard	(Netherlands) Antal van der Duim	(Switzerland) Luca Margaroli (Serbia) Ilija Vučić	7–5, 3–6, [10–7]
Loss	6–8	May 2016	Nigeria F3, Abuja	Futures	Hard	(Netherlands) Antal van der Duim	(United States) Nicolas Meister (Spain) David Pérez Sanz	6–3, 6–7^{(2–7)}, [9–11]
Win	7–8	Jul 2016	Netherlands F4, Amstelveen	Futures	Clay	(Brazil) José Pereira	(Netherlands) Miliaan Niesten (Netherlands) Boy Westerhof	6–4, 3–6, [10–3]
Win	8–8	Jul 2016	Austria F2, Kramsach	Futures	Clay	(Austria) Maximilian Neuchrist	(Austria) Sebastian Bader (Austria) Matthias Haim	6–3, 5–7, [10–4]
Win	9–8	Jul 2016	Germany F8, Kassel	Futures	Clay	(Austria) Maximilian Neuchrist	(Czech Republic) Petr Nouza (Czech Republic) David Škoch	6–2, 7–6^{(7–5)}
Win	10–8	Aug 2016	Poland F5, Bydgoszcz	Futures	Clay	(Austria) Maximilian Neuchrist	(Poland) Michał Dembek (Poland) Grzegorz Panfil	6–1, 7–5
Loss	10–9	Nov 2016	Finland F4, Helsinki	Futures	Hard (i)	(Germany) Andreas Mies	(Germany) Jeremy Jahn (Poland) Adam Majchrowicz	6–3, 6–7^{(4–7)}, [8–10]
Loss	10–10	Jan 2017	Germany F2, Kaarst	Futures	Carpet (i)	(Belgium) Joran Vliegen	(Germany) Jannis Kahlke (Germany) Oscar Otte	3–6, 7–5, [8–10]
Loss	10–11	Feb 2017	Switzerland F2, Bellevue	Futures	Carpet (i)	(Austria) Maximilian Neuchrist	(Germany) Daniel Altmaier (Germany) Marvin Netuschil	5–7, 6–1, [9–11]
Loss	10–12	May 2017	Sweden F1, Karlskrona	Futures	Clay	(Netherlands) Botic van de Zandschulp	(Uruguay) Martín Cuevas (Sweden) Christian Lindell	4–6, 7–6^{(7–3)}, [9–11]
Win	11–12	Jul 2017	Milan, Italy	Challenger	Clay	(Poland) Tomasz Bednarek	(Italy) Filippo Baldi (Italy) Omar Giacalone	6–1, 6–1
Loss	11–13	Aug 2017	Liberec, Czech Republic	Challenger	Clay	(Poland) Tomasz Bednarek	(Lithuania) Laurynas Grigelis (Czech Republic) Zdeněk Kolář	3–6, 4–6
Win	12–13	Aug 2017	Italy F25, Cornaiano	Futures	Clay	(Portugal) Gonçalo Oliveira	(Italy) Gianluca Di Nicola (Italy) Lorenzo Sonego	6–3, 6–2
Loss	12–14	Nov 2017	Mouilleron-le-Captif, France	Challenger	Hard (i)	(Poland) Tomasz Bednarek	(Germany) Andre Begemann (France) Jonathan Eysseric	3–6, 4–6
Win	13–14	May 2018	Heilbronn, Germany	Challenger	Clay	(Australia) Rameez Junaid	(Germany) Kevin Krawietz (Germany) Andreas Mies	6–2, 2–6, [10–7]
Loss	13–15	Sep 2018	Sibiu, Romania	Challenger	Clay	(Poland) Tomasz Bednarek	(Germany) Kevin Krawietz (Germany) Andreas Mies	4–6, 2–6
Win	14–15	Oct 2018	Florence, Italy	Challenger	Clay	(Australia) Rameez Junaid	(Italy) Filippo Baldi (Italy) Salvatore Caruso	7–5, 3–6, [10–7]
Loss	14–16	Oct 2018	Barcelona, Spain	Challenger	Clay	(Australia) Rameez Junaid	(Brazil) Marcelo Demoliner (Spain) David Vega Hernández	6–7^{(3–7)}, 3–6
Loss	14–17	Oct 2018	Ismaning, Germany	Challenger	Carpet (i)	(Australia) Rameez Junaid	(India) Purav Raja (Croatia) Antonio Šančić	7–5, 4–6, [5–10]
Loss	14–18	Nov 2018	Andria, Italy	Challenger	Hard (i)	(Switzerland) Marc-Andrea Hüsler	(Poland) Karol Drzewiecki (Poland) Szymon Walków	6–7^{(10–12)}, 6–2, [9–11]
Loss	14–19	Jan 2019	Rennes, France	Challenger	Hard (i)	(Croatia) Antonio Šančić	(Netherlands) Sander Arends (Austria) Tristan-Samuel Weissborn	4–6, 4–6
Loss	14–20	Feb 2019	Quimper, France	Challenger	Hard (i)	(Croatia) Antonio Šančić	(France) Fabrice Martin (France) Hugo Nys	4–6, 2–6
Loss	14–21	Apr 2019	Anning, China, P.R.	Challenger	Clay	(Chile) Hans Podlipnik Castillo	(Australia) Max Purcell (Australia) Luke Saville	6–4, 5–7, [5–10]
Win	15-21	Jul 2019	Tampere, Finland	Challenger	Clay	(Netherlands) Sander Arends	(Russia) Ivan Nedelko (Russia) Alexander Zhurbin	6–0, 6–2
Win	16-21	Aug 2019	Segovia, Spain	Challenger	Hard	(Netherlands) Sander Arends	(Brazil) Orlando Luz (Brazil) Felipe Meligeni Rodrigues Alves	6–4, 7–6^{(7–3)}
Win	17-21	Sep 2019	Mallorca, Spain	Challenger	Hard	(Netherlands) Sander Arends	(Poland) Karol Drzewiecki (Poland) Szymon Walków	7–5, 6–4
Loss	17–22	Sep 2019	Cassis, France	Challenger	Hard	(Netherlands) Sander Arends	(Sweden) André Göransson (Netherlands) Sem Verbeek	6-7^{(6–8)}, 6–4, [9-11]
Loss	17–23	Oct 2019	Mouilleron-le-Captif, France	Challenger	Hard (i)	(Netherlands) Sander Arends	(United Kingdom) Jonny O'Mara (United Kingdom) Ken Skupski	1–6, 4–6
Loss	17–24	Nov 2019	Ortisei, Italy	Challenger	Hard	(Netherlands) Sander Arends	(Serbia) Nikola Cacic (Croatia) Antonio Sancic	7-6^{(5–7)}, 6-7^{(3–7)}, [7-10]
Win	18-24	Feb 2020	Koblenz, Germany	Challenger	Hard (i)	(Netherlands) Sander Arends	(Germany) Julian Lenz (Germany) Yannick Maden	7–6^{(7–4)}, 7–6^{(7–3)}
Win	19-24	Aug 2020	Prague, Czech Republic	Challenger	Clay	(Netherlands) Sander Arends	(Sweden) André Göransson (Portugal) Gonçalo Oliveira	7–5, 7–6^{(7–5)}
Win	20-24	Oct 2020	Ismaning, Germany	Challenger	Carpet	(Germany) Andre Begemann	(United States) Alex Lawson (United Kingdom) Lloyd Glasspool	5–7, 7–6^{(7–2)}, [10–4]
Win	21-24	Jan 2021	Istanbul, Turkey	Challenger	Hard (i)	(Sweden) André Göransson	(United Kingdom) Lloyd Glasspool (Finland) Harri Heliövaara	4–6, 6–3, [10–8]
Loss	21–25	Oct 2021	Mouilleron-le-Captif, France	Challenger	Hard (i)	(Pakistan) Aisam-ul-Haq Qureshi	(France) Jonathan Eysseric (France) Quentin Halys	6-4, 6-7^{(5–7)}, [8-10]
Loss	21–26	Jan 2022	Quimper, France	Challenger	Hard (i)	(Netherlands) Sander Arends	(France) Albano Olivetti (Spain) David Vega Hernández	6-3, 4–6, [8-10]
Loss	21–27	Feb 2022	Turin, Italy	Challenger	Hard (i)	(Netherlands) Sander Arends	(Belgium) Ruben Bemelmans (Germany) Daniel Masur	6-3, 3–6, [8-10]
Win	22–27	Apr 2022	Saint-Brieuc, France	Challenger	Hard (i)	(Netherlands) Sander Arends	(France) Jonathan Eysseric (Netherlands) Robin Haase	6–3, 6–3
Win	23–27	May 2022	Mauthausen, Austria	Challenger	Clay	(Netherlands) Sander Arends	(Germany) Johannes Härteis (Lebanon) Benjamin Hassan	6–4, 6–3
Loss	23–28	Jun 2022	Lyon, France	Challenger	Clay	(Netherlands) Sander Arends	(Monaco) Romain Arneodo (France) Jonathan Eysseric	5-7, 6–4, [4-10]
Win	24–28	Aug 2022	Meerbusch, Germany	Challenger	Clay	(Poland) Szymon Walków	(Austria) Neil Oberleitner (Austria) Philipp Oswald	7–5, 6–1
Win	25–28	Sep 2022	Rennes, France	Challenger	Hard (i)	(France) Jonathan Eysseric	(France) Dan Added (France) Albano Olivetti	6–4, 6–4
Win	26–28	Oct 2022	Mouilleron-le-Captif, France	Challenger	Hard (i)	(Netherlands) Sander Arends	(India) Purav Raja (India) Divij Sharan	7–6^{(7–1)}, 6–7^{(6–8)}, [6–10]
Win	27–28	Jan 2023	Oeiras, Portugal	Challenger	Hard (i)	(Netherlands) Sander Arends	(Finland) Patrik Niklas-Salminen (Netherlands) Bart Stevens	6–3, 7–6^{(7–3)}
Win	28–28	Mar 2023	Lugano, Switzerland	Challenger	Hard (i)	(Belgium) Zizou Bergs	(Germany) Constantin Frantzen (Germany) Hendrik Jebens	6–2, 7–6^{(8–6)}
Win	29–28	Aug 2024	Sauerland, Germany	Challenger	Clay	(Netherlands) Bart Stevens	(Netherlands) Matwé Middelkoop (Ukraine) Denys Molchanov	6–4, 2–6, [10-8]
Win	30–28	Oct 2024	Roanne, France	Challenger	Hard (i)	(Colombia) Nicolas Barrientos	(Switzerland) Jakub Paul (Czech Republic) Matěj Vocel	4–6, 6–3, [10-6]
Win	31–28	Jan 2025	Koblenz, Germany	Challenger	Hard (i)	(Switzerland) Jakub Paul	(France) Geoffrey Blancaneaux (United Kingdom) Joshua Paris	walkover
Win	32–28	Feb 2025	Lille, France	Challenger	Hard (i)	(Switzerland) Jakub Paul	(Poland) Karol Drzewiecki (Poland) Piotr Matuszewski	6–3, 6–4
Loss	32–29	Feb 2025	Lugano, Switzerland	Challenger	Hard (i)	(Switzerland) Jakub Paul	(Canada) Cleeve Harper (United Kingdom) David Stevenson	6–4, 3–6, [8–10]
Win	33–29	Mar 2025	Thionville, France	Challenger	Hard	(Switzerland) Jakub Paul	(France) Matteo Martineau (France) Luca Sanchez	6–1, 6–4
Loss	33–30	Apr 2025	Madrid, Spain	Challenger	Clay	(Switzerland) Jakub Paul	(Portugal) Francisco Cabral (Austria) Lucas Miedler	6–7^{(2–7)}, 4–6
Loss	33–31	May 2026	Valencia, Spain	Challenger	Clay	(Netherlands) Sander Arends	(Germany) Constantin Frantzen (Netherlands) Robin Haase	4–6, 7–6^{(7–5)}, [9–11]
