= Lukáš Lacko =

Slovak tennis player

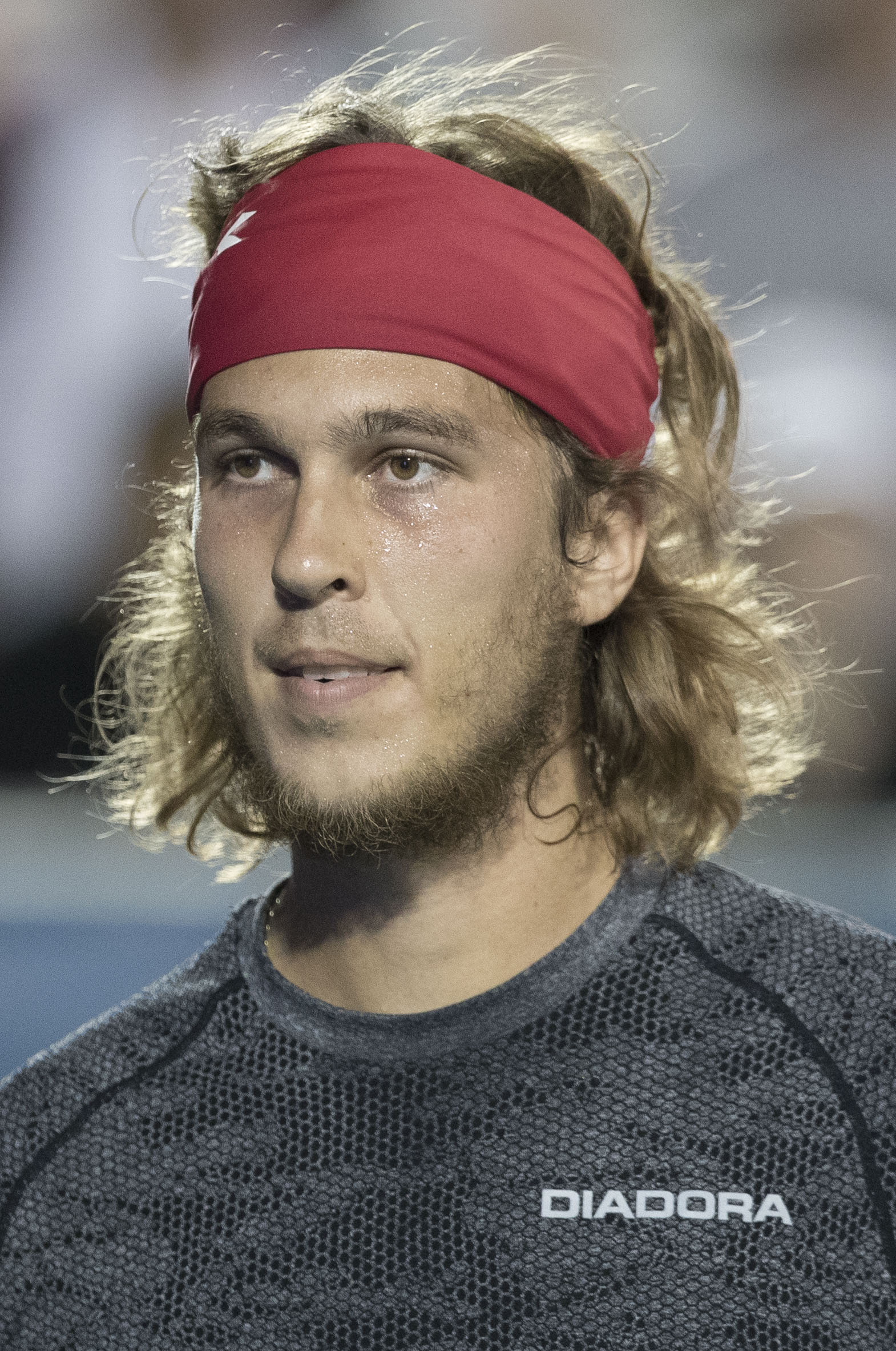
- Country (sports): Slovakia
- Residence: Bratislava, Slovakia
- Born: 3 November 1987 (age 38) Piešťany, Czechoslovakia
- Height: 1.85 m (6 ft 1 in)
- Turned pro: 2005
- Retired: 2022
- Plays: Right-handed (two-handed backhand)
- Coach: Dominik Hrbaty
- Prize money: US$ 3,602,283

Singles
- Career record: 98–148
- Career titles: 0
- Highest ranking: No. 44 (14 January 2013)

Grand Slam singles results
- Australian Open: 3R (2012, 2017)
- French Open: 2R (2010)
- Wimbledon: 3R (2012, 2016)
- US Open: 1R (2010-2011, 2012, 2013, 2014, 2015, 2016, 2017, (2018)

Other tournaments
- Olympic Games: 1R (2012)

Doubles
- Career record: 6–32
- Career titles: 0
- Highest ranking: No. 170 (5 July 2010)

Grand Slam doubles results
- Australian Open: 1R (2010, 2011, 2013)
- French Open: 1R (2010, 2012, 2013)
- Wimbledon: 3R (2010)
- US Open: 2R (2010)
- Last updated on: 21 November 2022.

Lukáš Lacko (Slovak pronunciation: [ˈlukaːʂ ˈlatskɔ]; born 3 November 1987) is a former professional Slovak tennis player. His career-high ATP singles ranking is World No. 44, achieved in January 2013.

== Tennis career ==
=== Juniors ===
As a junior Lacko compiled a singles win–loss record of 88–39, reaching as high as No. 3 in the combined junior world rankings in February 2005.

Junior Grand Slam results:

Australian Open: QF (2005)
French Open: SF (2005)
Wimbledon: 1R (2004)
US Open: 2R (2005)

=== Professional tour ===
At the 2010 Australian Open, he lost in the second round to World No. 2 and defending champion Rafael Nadal 2–6, 2–6, 2–6.

At the 2010 French Open, he played and won the longest match of his career in the first round against American Michael Yani with the score at 6–4, 6–7, 6–7, 7–6, 12–10. The 4-hour, 56-minutes match stretched over the course of two days, and tied the record for the most games played in the Open Era at the French Open. Lacko continued his second round streak in 2010 majors by defeating the 24th seed Marcos Baghdatis in four sets. He then lost a very tight five set second round match against Jérémy Chardy. He played in the 2010 Atlanta Tennis Championships and upset former World No.1 Lleyton Hewitt 6–2, 6–4 to advance to the quarterfinals. At the 2011 Qatar Open, he lost in the second round to Rafael Nadal, despite achieving the rare feat of winning a bagel set against Nadal.

He reached his first singles ATP final in Zagreb 2012, where he lost to Mikhail Youzhny in straight sets. At the 2012 Summer Olympics, he lost in the first round in the men's singles, and in the first round of the men's doubles with Martin Kližan. At the 2014 French Open he lost in the first round to Roger Federer.

Lacko reached his second career ATP final at the 2018 Eastbourne International losing to Mischa Zverev.

In October 2022, he announced that 2022 will be his last season.

== ATP Tour career finals ==
=== Singles: 2 (2 runner-ups) ===
Legend Grand Slam tournaments (0–0) ATP World Tour Finals (0–0) ATP World Tour Masters 1000 (0–0) ATP World Tour 500 Series (0–0) ATP World Tour 250 Series (0–2)	Finals by surface Hard (0–1) Clay (0–0) Grass (0–1)	Finals by setting Outdoor (0–1) Indoor (0–1)

Result	W–L	Date	Tournament	Tier	Surface	Opponent	Score
Loss	0–1	Feb 2012	Zagreb, Croatia	250 Series	Hard (i)	(Russia) Mikhail Youzhny	2–6, 3–6
Loss	0–2	Jun 2018	Eastbourne, United Kingdom	250 Series	Grass	(Germany) Mischa Zverev	4–6, 4–6

=== Doubles: 1 (1 runner-up) ===
Legend Grand Slam tournaments (0–0) ATP World Tour Finals (0–0) ATP World Tour Masters 1000 (0–0) ATP World Tour 500 Series (0–0) ATP World Tour 250 Series (0–1)	Finals by surface Hard (0–1) Clay (0–0) Grass (0–0)	Finals by setting Outdoor (0–0) Indoor (0–1)

Result	W–L	Date	Tournament	Tier	Surface	Partner	Opponents	Score
Loss	0–1	Sep 2012	St. Petersburg Open, Russia	250 Series	Hard (i)	(Slovakia) Igor Zelenay	(United States) Rajeev Ram (Serbia) Nenad Zimonjić	2–6, 6–4, [6–10]

== ATP Challenger and ITF Futures finals ==
=== Singles: 40 (22–18) ===
Legend ATP Challenger (14–13) ITF Futures (8–5)	Finals by surface Hard (15–11) Clay (3–6) Grass (0–0) Carpet (4–1)

Result	W–L	Date	Tournament	Tier	Surface	Opponent	Score
Loss	0–1	May 2005	Morocco F4, Marrakesh	Futures	Clay	(Algeria) Lamine Ouahab	6–4, 3–6, 2–6
Loss	0–2	Aug 2005	Croatia F3, Vinkovci	Futures	Clay	(Croatia) Marin Cilic	3–6, 1–6
Win	1–2	Oct 2005	Italy F32, Olbia	Futures	Clay	(Austria) Tobias Koeck	6–1, 6–3
Win	2–2	Oct 2005	Ukraine F2, Cherkassy	Futures	Clay	(Germany) Sascha Kloer	2–6, 6–3, 6–1
Loss	2–3	Oct 2005	Ukraine F3, Illyichovsk	Futures	Clay	(Cyprus) Photos Kallias	3–6, 7–5, 1–5
Loss	2–4	Nov 2005	Czech Republic F6, Ostravicí	Futures	Hard	(Czech Republic) Jan Hajek	6–1, 5–7, 4–6
Win	3–4	Jan 2006	Austria F2, Salzburg	Futures	Carpet	(Austria) Werner Eschauer	3–6, 6–1, 7–5
Loss	3–5	Jun 2006	Italy F19, L'Aquila	Futures	Clay	(Slovakia) Kamil Capkovic	2–6, 6–7^{(6–8)}
Win	4–5	Jul 2006	Germany F6, Kassel	Futures	Clay	(Jamaica) Dustin Brown	3–6, 6–3, 6–4
Loss	4–6	Aug 2006	Binghamton, United States	Challenger	Hard	(United States) Scott Oudsema	6–7^{(5–7)}, 2–6
Loss	4–7	May 2007	Rijeka, Croatia	Challenger	Clay	(Croatia) Marin Čilić	5–7, 2–6
Loss	4–8	Aug 2007	Istanbul, Turkey	Challenger	Hard	(Germany) Mischa Zverev	4–6, 4–6
Win	5–8	Oct 2007	Kolding, Denmark	Challenger	Hard	(Luxembourg) Gilles Müller	7–6^{(7–3)}, 6–4
Win	6–8	Jan 2009	Great Britain F2, Sheffield	Futures	Hard	(United States) Scott Oudsema	7–6^{(7–5)}, 5–7, 6–3
Win	7–8	Feb 2009	Croatia F2, Zagreb	Futures	Hard	(Croatia) Antonio Sancic	6–2, 4–6, 7–5
Win	8–8	Apr 2009	Russia F1, Moscow	Futures	Carpet	(Russia) Denis Matsukevitch	6–4, 4–6, 6–2
Win	9–8	Apr 2009	Russia F2, Tyumen	Futures	Carpet	(Russia) Pavel Chekhov	6–3, 5–7, 6–4
Win	10–8	May 2009	Fergana, Uzbekistan	Challenger	Hard	(Australia) Samuel Groth	4–6, 7–5, 7–6^{(7–4)}
Win	11–8	Nov 2009	Seoul, South Korea	Challenger	Hard	(Czech Republic) Dušan Lojda	6–4, 6–2
Loss	11–9	Nov 2010	Ortisei, Italy	Challenger	Clay	(Poland) Michał Przysiężny	3–6, 5–7
Win	12–9	Sep 2011	Izmir, Turkey	Challenger	Hard	(Turkey) Marsel İlhan	6–4, 6–3
Win	13–9	Nov 2011	Bratislava, Slovakia	Challenger	Hard	(Lithuania) Ričardas Berankis	7–6^{(9–7)}, 6–2
Loss	13–10	Oct 2012	Tashkent, Uzbekistan	Challenger	Hard	(Belarus) Uladzimir Ignatik	3–6, 6–7^{(3–7)}
Win	14–10	Nov 2012	Helsinki, Finland	Challenger	Hard	(Finland) Jarkko Nieminen	6–3, 6–4
Loss	14–11	Jul 2013	Granby, Canada	Challenger	Hard	(Canada) Frank Dancevic	4–6, 7–6^{(7–4)}, 3–6
Win	15–11	Nov 2013	Bratislava, Slovakia	Challenger	Hard	(Czech Republic) Lukáš Rosol	6–4, 4–6, 6–4
Loss	15–12	Apr 2014	Shenzhen, China	Challenger	Hard	(Luxembourg) Gilles Müller	6–7, 3–6
Win	16–12	Oct 2014	Tashkent, Uzbekistan	Challenger	Hard	(Ukraine) Sergiy Stakhovsky	6–2, 6–3
Loss	16–13	Apr 2015	Ra'anana, Israel	Challenger	Hard	(Georgia (country)) Nikoloz Basilashvili	6–4,4–6,3–6
Loss	16–14	May 2015	Busan, South Korea	Challenger	Hard	(South Korea) Chung Hyeon	3–6,1–6
Win	17–14	Sep 2015	Izmir, Turkey	Challenger	Hard	(Romania) Marius Copil	6–3, 7–6^{(7–5)}
Loss	17–15	Oct 2015	Tashkent, Uzbekistan	Challenger	Hard	(Uzbekistan) Denis Istomin	3–6, 4–6
Loss	17–16	Nov 2015	Bratislava, Slovakia	Challenger	Hard	(Belarus) Egor Gerasimov	6–7^{(1–7)}, 6–7^{(5–7)}
Loss	17–17	Mar 2016	Guangzhou, China	Challenger	Hard	(Georgia (country)) Nikoloz Basilashvili	1–6, 7–6^{(8–6)}, 5–7
Win	18–17	Nov 2017	Bratislava, Slovakia	Challenger	Hard	(Romania) Marius Copil	6–4, 7–6^{(7–4)}
Win	19–17	Nov 2017	Brescia, Italy	Challenger	Hard	(Lithuania) Laurynas Grigelis	6–1, 6–2
Win	20–17	May 2018	Glasgow, United Kingdom	Challenger	Hard	(Italy) Luca Vanni	4–6, 7–6^{(7–3)}, 6–4
Win	21–17	Oct 2019	Ismaning, Germany	Challenger	Carpet	(United States) Maxime Cressy	6–3, 6–0
Win	22–17	Aug 2021	Mallorca, Spain	Challenger	Hard	(Japan) Yasutaka Uchiyama	5–7, 7–6^{(10–8)}, 6–1
Loss	22–18	Oct 2021	Ismaning, Germany	Challenger	Carpet	(Germany) Oscar Otte	4-6, 4-6

=== Doubles: 9 (5–4) ===
Legend ATP Challenger (4–4) ITF Futures (1–0)	Finals by surface Hard (4–2) Clay (0–2) Grass (0–0) Carpet (1–0)

Result	W–L	Date	Tournament	Tier	Surface	Partner	Opponents	Score
Win	1–0	Apr 2006	Dharwad, India	Challenger	Hard	(Slovakia) Kamil Čapkovič	(Thailand) Sanchai Ratiwatana (Thailand) Sonchat Ratiwatana	6–3, 7–5
Loss	1–1	Jun 2006	Kosice, Slovakia	Challenger	Clay	(Slovakia) Kamil Čapkovič	(Slovakia) Viktor Bruthans (Czech Republic) Pavel Snobel	5–7, 7–5, [4–10]
Loss	1–2	May 2007	Rijeka, Croatia	Challenger	Clay	(Slovakia) Ivo Klec	(Monaco) Jean-Rene Lisnard (France) Jerome Haehnel	3–6, 4–6
Win	2–2	Apr 2009	Russia F1, Moscow	Futures	Carpet	(Russia) Konstantin Kravchuk	(Russia) Pavel Chekhov (Russia) Valery Rudnev	6–2, 6–4
Win	3–2	Sep 2009	St. Remy, France	Challenger	Hard	(Czech Republic) Jiří Krkoška	(Belgium) Ruben Bemelmans (Belgium) Niels Desein	6–1, 3–6, [10–3]
Loss	3–3	Oct 2009	Tashkent, Uzbekistan	Challenger	Hard	(Czech Republic) Jiří Krkoška	(Uzbekistan) Denis Istomin (Uzbekistan) Murad Inoyatov	6–7^{(4–7)}, 4–6
Win	4–3	Nov 2011	Bratislava, Slovakia	Challenger	Hard	(Czech Republic) Jan Hájek	(Czech Republic) Lukáš Rosol (Czech Republic) David Škoch	7–5, 7–5
Win	5–3	Oct 2014	Tashkent, Uzbekistan	Challenger	Hard	(Croatia) Ante Pavić	(Germany) Frank Moser (Germany) Alexander Satschko	6–3, 3–6, [13–11]
Loss	5–4	Jan 2020	Rennes, France	Challenger	Hard	(Russia) Teymuraz Gabashvili	(Croatia) Antonio Sancic (Austria) Tristan-Samuel Weissborn	5–7, 7–6^{(7–5)}, [7–10]

== Performance timelines ==
Key
W	F	SF	QF	#R	RR	Q#	P#	DNQ	A	Z#	PO	G	S	B	NMS	NTI	P	NH

(W) winner; (F) finalist; (SF) semifinalist; (QF) quarterfinalist; (#R) rounds 4, 3, 2, 1; (RR) round-robin stage; (Q#) qualification round; (P#) preliminary round; (DNQ) did not qualify; (A) absent; (Z#) Davis/Fed Cup Zonal Group (with number indication) or (PO) play-off; (G) gold, (S) silver or (B) bronze Olympic/Paralympic medal; (NMS) not a Masters tournament; (NTI) not a Tier I tournament; (P) postponed; (NH) not held; (SR) strike rate (events won / competed); (W–L) win–loss record.
To avoid confusion and double counting, these charts are updated at the conclusion of a tournament or when the player's participation has ended.

=== Singles ===
Current through the 2022 Australian Open.

Tournament	2006	2007	2008	2009	2010	2011	2012	2013	2014	2015	2016	2017	2018	2019	2020	2021	2022	SR	W–L	Win %
Grand Slam tournaments
Australian Open	A	1R	1R	A	2R	1R	3R	2R	1R	2R	Q1	3R	2R	Q1	Q1	Q1	Q1	0 / 10	8–10	44%
French Open	A	Q1	Q1	A	2R	Q1	1R	1R	1R	1R	A	Q1	A	Q1	Q1	Q1	Q1	0 / 5	1–5	17%
Wimbledon	A	Q1	A	1R	2R	1R	3R	1R	1R	1R	3R	Q3	2R	Q1	NH	Q1	Q1	0 / 9	6–9	40%
US Open	Q1	Q3	Q2	Q3	1R	1R	1R	1R	1R	1R	1R	1R	1R	Q3	A	Q1	A	0 / 9	0–9	0%
Win–loss	0–0	0–1	0–1	0–1	3–4	0–3	4–4	1–4	0–4	1–4	2–2	2–2	2–3	0–0	0–0	0–0	0–0	0 / 33	15–33	31%
ATP Tour Masters 1000
Indian Wells Masters	A	A	A	A	1R	A	A	1R	A	A	A	A	1R	Q2	NH	A		0 / 3	0–3	0%
Miami Open	A	A	Q1	A	1R	A	2R	1R	2R	Q2	A	1R	1R	1R	A	A		0 / 7	2–7	22%
Madrid Open	A	A	A	A	1R	A	A	A	A	A	A	Q2	A	A	NH	A		0 / 1	0–1	0%
Italian Open	A	A	A	A	A	A	A	A	A	A	A	Q1	A	A	A	A		0 / 0	0–0	–
Canadian Open	A	A	A	A	A	A	1R	Q1	A	A	A	A	A	A	NH	A		0 / 1	0–1	0%
Cincinnati Masters	A	A	A	A	A	A	Q1	A	A	A	A	A	A	A	A	A		0 / 0	0–0	–
Paris Masters	A	A	A	A	A	A	Q1	Q1	A	A	A	A	A	A	NH			0 / 0	0–0	–
Win–loss	0–0	0–0	0–0	0–0	0–3	0–0	1–2	0–2	1–1	0–0	0–0	0–1	0–2	0–1	0–0	0–0	0–0	0 / 11	2–11	15%
Career statistics
	2006	2007	2008	2009	2010	2011	2012	2013	2014	2015	2016	2017	2018	2019	2020	2021	2022	Career		
Tournaments	0	2	1	3	21	7	19	16	17	12	7	10	16	3	0	1	0	135		
Titles–Finals	0–0	0–0	0–0	0–0	0–0	0–0	0–1	0–0	0–0	0–0	0–0	0–0	0–1	0–0	0–0	0–0	0–0	0–2		
Year-end ranking	231	139	325	82	89	112	51	81	95	110	122	92	114	183	200	190	986			

=== Doubles ===
Tournament	2010	2011	2012	2013	2014	2015	2016	2017	2018	2019	2020	2021	2022	W–L
Grand Slam tournaments
Australian Open	1R	1R	A	1R	A	A	A	A	A	A	A	A	A	0–3
French Open	1R	A	1R	1R	A	A	A	A	A	A	A	A	A	0–3
Wimbledon	3R	1R	1R	1R	A	A	A	A	A	A	NH	A	A	2–4
US Open	2R	A	1R	1R	A	A	A	A	1R	A	A	A	A	1–4
Win–loss	3–4	0–2	0–3	0–4	0–0	0–0	0–0	0–0	0–1	0–0	0–0	0–0	0–0	3–14
