= Max Hans Rehberg =

German tennis player (born 2003)

- Country (sports): Germany
- Born: 13 September 2003 (age 23) Munich, Germany
- Height: 1.83 m (6 ft 0 in)
- Plays: Right-handed (two-handed backhand)
- Coach: Benjamin Benedikter
- Prize money: US $267,398

Singles
- Career record: 0–4 (at ATP Tour level, Grand Slam level, and in Davis Cup)
- Career titles: 0
- Highest ranking: No. 230 (31 March 2025)
- Current ranking: No. 262 (19 October 2026)

Doubles
- Career record: 2–4 (at ATP Tour level, Grand Slam level, and in Davis Cup)
- Career titles: 0
- Highest ranking: No. 283 (30 June 2025)
- Current ranking: No. 834 (19 October 2026)
- Last updated on: 19 October 2026.

Max Hans Rehberg (born 13 September 2003) is a German tennis player. He has a career high ATP singles ranking of world No. 230, achieved on 31 March 2025, and a best doubles ranking of world No. 283, attained on 30 June 2025.

== Career ==
Rehberg made his ATP main draw debut at the 2022 BMW Open after receiving a wildcard into the singles and doubles main draws. He received a wildcard for the singles main draw of the 2022 Hamburg European Open. He also received a singles wildcard for the 2023 BMW Open.

At the 2024 BMW Open also as a wildcard he lost to Alex Michelsen. Rehberg also received qualifying wildcards for the 2024 BOSS Open, and for the 2024 Halle Open where he lost again to the third qualifying seed Alex Michelsen.

== Singles performance timeline ==
Key
W	F	SF	QF	#R	RR	Q#	DNQ	A	NH

(W) winner; (F) finalist; (SF) semifinalist; (QF) quarterfinalist; (#R) rounds 4, 3, 2, 1; (RR) round-robin stage; (Q#) qualification round; (DNQ) did not qualify; (A) absent; (NH) not held; (SR) strike rate (events won / competed); (W–L) win–loss record.
To avoid confusion and double counting, these charts are updated at the conclusion of a tournament or when the player's participation has ended.

Current through the 2024 ATP Tour.

Tournament	2022	2023	2024	2025	SR	W–L
Grand Slam tournaments
Australian Open	A	A	A	A	0 / 0	0–0
French Open	A	A	A	A	0 / 0	0–0
Wimbledon	A	A	A	A	0 / 0	0–0
US Open	A	A	A		0 / 0	0–0
Career statistics
Tournaments	2	1	1	0	4	
Overall win–loss	0–2	0–1	0–1	0–0	0–4	
Year-end ranking	424	576	270			

== ATP Challenger finals ==
=== Singles: 1 (0–1) ===
Finals by surface
Hard (0–0)
Clay (0–0)
Carpet (0–1)

Result	W–L	Date	Tournament	Surface	Opponent	Score
Loss	0–1	Oct 2022	Ismaning, Germany	Carpet (i)	(France) Quentin Halys	6–7^{(6–8)}, 3–6

=== Doubles: 1 (1–0) ===
Finals by surface
Hard (0–0)
Clay (1–0)

Result	W–L	Date	Tournament	Surface	Partner	Opponents	Score
Win	1–0	Apr 2026	Shymkent, Kazakhstan	Clay	(Germany) Max Wiskandt	(United States) Dali Blanch; Svyatoslav Gulin	6–1, 5–7, [10–6]

== ITF World Tennis Tour finals ==
=== Singles: 7 (4–3) ===
Finals by surface
Hard (1–1)
Clay (2–2)
Carpet (1–0)

Result	W–L	Date	Tournament	Surface	Opponent	Score
Loss	0–1	May 2022	M15 Meerbusch, Germany	Clay	(Belgium) Gauthier Onclin	3–6, 1–6
Win	1–1	Oct 2022	M15 Forbach, France	Carpet (i)	(Argentina) Federico Agustín Gómez	6–4, 6–2
Loss	1–2	Aug 2023	M15 Überlingen, Germany	Clay	(Germany) Jakob Schnaitter	7–6^{(7–2)}, 1–6, 2–6
Loss	1–3	Feb 2024	M15 Oberhaching, Germany	Hard (i)	(Republic of Ireland) Michael Agwi	6–7^{(3–7)}, 1–6
Win	2–3	Jan 2026	M15 Oslo, Norway	Hard (i)	(Luxembourg) Alex Knaff	6–2, 4–6, 6–3
Win	3–3	Jun 2026	M25 Brussels, Belgium	Clay	(Switzerland) Dylan Dietrich	6–1, 6–2
Win	4–3	Sep 2026	M25 Pula, Italy	Clay	Andrey Chepelev	6–0, 6–1
