= Wolffkran Open =

- 2023 Wolffkran Open

Defunct tennis tournament
- Event name: Wolffkran Open
- Location: Ismaning, Germany
- Venue: Sportpark Ismaning
- Category: ATP Challenger Tour
- Surface: Carpet / Indoors
- Draw: 32S/32Q/16D
- Prize money: €43,000 + H

The Wolffkran Open was a professional tennis tournament played on indoor carpet courts. It was part of the Association of Tennis Professionals (ATP) Challenger Tour. It was held annually in Ismaning, Germany from 2017 until 2023.

== Past finals ==
=== Singles ===
Year	Champion	Runner-up	Score
2023	(Switzerland) Antoine Bellier	(Germany) Maximilian Marterer	7–6^{(7–5)}, 6–7^{(5–7)}, 7–6^{(8–6)}
2022	(France) Quentin Halys	(Germany) Max Hans Rehberg	7–6^{(8–6)}, 6–3
2021	(Germany) Oscar Otte	(Slovakia) Lukáš Lacko	6–4, 6–4
2020	(Switzerland) Marc-Andrea Hüsler	(Netherlands) Botic van de Zandschulp	6–7^{(3–7)}, 7–6^{(7–2)}, 7–5
2019	(Slovakia) Lukáš Lacko	(United States) Maxime Cressy	6–3, 6–0
2018	(Italy) Filippo Baldi	(France) Gleb Sakharov	6–4, 6–4
2017	(Germany) Yannick Hanfmann	(Italy) Lorenzo Sonego	6–4, 3–6, 7–5

=== Doubles ===
Year	Champions	Runners-up	Score
2023	(India) Sriram Balaji (Germany) Andre Begemann	(Germany) Constantin Frantzen (Germany) Hendrik Jebens	7–6^{(7–4)}, 6–4
2022	(Belgium) Michael Geerts (Finland) Patrik Niklas-Salminen	(Germany) Fabian Fallert (Germany) Hendrik Jebens	7–6^{(7–5)}, 7–6^{(10–8)}
2021	(Germany) Andre Begemann (Slovakia) Igor Zelenay	(Czech Republic) Marek Gengel (Czech Republic) Tomáš Macháč	6–2, 6–4
2020	(Germany) Andre Begemann (Netherlands) David Pel	(United Kingdom) Lloyd Glasspool (United States) Alex Lawson	5–7, 7–6^{(7–2)}, [10–4]
2019	(France) Quentin Halys (France) Tristan Lamasine	(United States) James Cerretani (United States) Maxime Cressy	6–3, 7–5
2018	(India) Purav Raja (Croatia) Antonio Šančić	(Australia) Rameez Junaid (Netherlands) David Pel	5–7, 6–4, [10–5]
2017	(Croatia) Marin Draganja (Croatia) Tomislav Draganja	(Germany) Dustin Brown (Germany) Tim Pütz	6–7^{(1–7)}, 6–2, [10–8]
