= 2016 Internationaux de Tennis de Vendée – Doubles =

Doubles
- 2016 Internationaux de Tennis de Vendée

Final
- Champions: (France) Jonathan Eysseric (France) Édouard Roger-Vasselin
- Runners-up: (Sweden) Johan Brunström (Sweden) Andreas Siljeström
- Score: 6–7^{(1–7)}, 7–6^{(7–3)}, [11–9]

Events
Singles	Doubles
← 2015 ·	Internationaux de Tennis de Vendée	· 2017 →

Sander Arends and Adam Majchrowicz were the defending champions but chose not to defend their title.

Jonathan Eysseric and Édouard Roger-Vasselin won the title after defeating Johan Brunström and Andreas Siljeström 6–7^{(1–7)}, 7–6^{(7–3)}, [11–9] in the final.

== Seeds ==
1. (France) Jonathan Eysseric / (France) Édouard Roger-Vasselin (champions)
2. (Sweden) Johan Brunström / (Sweden) Andreas Siljeström (final)
3. (United States) James Cerretani / (Austria) Philipp Oswald (quarterfinals)
4. (Croatia) Nikola Mektić / (Croatia) Franko Škugor (semifinals)

== Draw ==
=== Key ===
- Q = Qualifier
- WC = Wild card
- LL = Lucky loser
- Alt = Alternate
- SE = Special exempt
- PR = Protected ranking
- ITF = ITF entry
- JE = Junior exempt
- w/o = Walkover
- r = Retired
- d = Defaulted
- SR = Special ranking

First round
WC	(France) G Sakharov (France) Vincent Stouff	7	0	[9]
(France) R Jouan (France) A Musialek	5	6	[11]
3	(United States) J Cerretani (Austria) P Oswald	6	6
(France) R Boutillier (France) C Hemery	0	4
(Switzerland) A Bossel (France) Maxime Tabatruong	4	2
WC	(France) A Hoang (Germany) A Mies	6	6
(Croatia) I Sabanov (Croatia) M Sabanov	3	6	[10]
(France) S Doumbia (France) F Reboul	6	3	[4]
(Spain) E López-Pérez (Spain) P Riba	1	3
4	(Croatia) N Mektić (Croatia) F Škugor	6	6
WC	(Italy) L Giustino (France) Mick Lescure	4	2
(France) A Sidorenko (Russia) A Vatutin	6	6

Quarterfinals
1	(France) J Eysseric (France) É Roger-Vasselin	6	6
(France) R Jouan (France) A Musialek	1	3
3	(United States) J Cerretani (Austria) P Oswald	6^{6}	6	[7]
WC	(France) A Hoang (Germany) A Mies	7^{8}	4	[10]
(Croatia) I Sabanov (Croatia) M Sabanov	5	2
4	(Croatia) N Mektić (Croatia) F Škugor	7	6
(France) A Sidorenko (Russia) A Vatutin	1	1
2	(Sweden) J Brunström (Sweden) A Siljeström	6	6

Semifinals
1	(France) J Eysseric (France) É Roger-Vasselin	6	7^{7}
WC	(France) A Hoang (Germany) A Mies	4	6^{5}
4	(Croatia) N Mektić (Croatia) F Škugor	6^{4}	6^{4}
2	(Sweden) J Brunström (Sweden) A Siljeström	7^{7}	7^{7}

Final
1	(France) J Eysseric (France) É Roger-Vasselin	6^{1}	7^{7}	[11]
2	(Sweden) J Brunström (Sweden) A Siljeström	7^{7}	6^{3}	[9]
