= 2018 Internationaux de Tennis de Vendée – Doubles =

Doubles
- 2018 Internationaux de Tennis de Vendée

Final
- Champions: (Belgium) Sander Gillé (Belgium) Joran Vliegen
- Runners-up: (Monaco) Romain Arneodo (France) Quentin Halys
- Score: 6–3, 4–6, [10–2]

Events
Singles	Doubles
← 2017 ·	Internationaux de Tennis de Vendée	· 2019 →

Andre Begemann and Jonathan Eysseric were the defending champions but only Begemann chose to defend his title, partnering Rameez Junaid. Begemann lost in the quarterfinals to Romain Arneodo and Quentin Halys.

Sander Gillé and Joran Vliegen won the title after defeating Arneodo and Halys 6–3, 4–6, [10–2] in the final.

== Seeds ==
1. (Netherlands) Wesley Koolhof / (France) Hugo Nys (quarterfinals)
2. (United States) James Cerretani / (Israel) Jonathan Erlich (semifinals)
3. (Belgium) Sander Gillé / (Belgium) Joran Vliegen (champions)
4. (Germany) Andre Begemann / (Australia) Rameez Junaid (quarterfinals)

== Draw ==
=== Key ===
- Q = Qualifier
- WC = Wild card
- LL = Lucky loser
- Alt = Alternate
- SE = Special exempt
- PR = Protected ranking
- ITF = ITF entry
- JE = Junior exempt
- w/o = Walkover
- r = Retired
- d = Defaulted
- SR = Special ranking

First round
1	(Netherlands) W Koolhof (France) H Nys	6	6
(France) F Martin (Italy) J Ocleppo	3	4
(Italy) L Vanni (Russia) A Vatutin	6	4	[5]
(Switzerland) L Margaroli (Spain) D Vega Hernández	4	6	[10]
4	(Germany) A Begemann (Australia) R Junaid	7	6
(Lithuania) L Grigelis (Italy) A Motti	5	2
(Belgium) K Coppejans (Belgium) J De Loore	6	2	[8]
(Monaco) R Arneodo (France) Q Halys	1	6	[10]
(Croatia) T Draganja (Poland) S Walków	4	2
(Spain) P Martínez (Spain) B Zapata Miralles	6	6
(Sweden) A Siljeström (Sweden) E Ymer	4	3
3	(Belgium) S Gillé (Belgium) J Vliegen	6	6
(France) D Added (France) E Benchetrit	7	6^{1}	[14]
(France) Tom Jomby (France) B Paire	5	7^{7}	[12]
(France) G Sakharov (France) C Tabur	6	4	[6]
2	(United States) J Cerretani (Israel) J Erlich	4	6	[10]

Quarterfinals
1	(Netherlands) W Koolhof (France) H Nys	2	5
(Switzerland) L Margaroli (Spain) D Vega Hernández	6	7
4	(Germany) A Begemann (Australia) R Junaid	6	4	[8]
(Monaco) R Arneodo (France) Q Halys	4	6	[10]
(Spain) P Martínez (Spain) B Zapata Miralles	1	4
3	(Belgium) S Gillé (Belgium) J Vliegen	6	6
(France) D Added (France) E Benchetrit	4	3
2	(United States) J Cerretani (Israel) J Erlich	6	6

Semifinals
(Switzerland) L Margaroli (Spain) D Vega Hernández	4	6^{4}
(Monaco) R Arneodo (France) Q Halys	6	7^{7}
3	(Belgium) S Gillé (Belgium) J Vliegen	6	6
2	(United States) J Cerretani (Israel) J Erlich	4	4

Final
(Monaco) R Arneodo (France) Q Halys	3	6	[2]
3	(Belgium) S Gillé (Belgium) J Vliegen	6	4	[10]
