= 2017 Internationaux de Tennis de Vendée =

- Date: 6–12 November
- Edition: 5th
- Surface: Hard
- Location: Mouilleron-le-Captif, France

Champions

Singles
- (Sweden) Elias Ymer

Doubles
- (Germany) Andre Begemann / (France) Jonathan Eysseric
← 2016 ·	Internationaux de Tennis de Vendée	· 2018 →

The 2017 Internationaux de Tennis de Vendée was a professional tennis tournament played on hard courts. It was the fifth edition of the tournament which was part of the 2017 ATP Challenger Tour. It took place in Mouilleron-le-Captif, France between 6 and 12 November 2017.

== Singles main-draw entrants ==
=== Seeds ===
Country	Player	Rank^{1}	Seed
FRA	Benoît Paire	40	1
GER	Peter Gojowczyk	62	2
~~ESP~~	~~Guillermo García López~~	~~72~~	~~3~~
BEL	Ruben Bemelmans	86	4
TUN	Malek Jaziri	94	5
GER	Maximilian Marterer	106	6
KAZ	Alexander Bublik	112	7
ITA	Stefano Travaglia	134	8
ESP	Tommy Robredo	151	9

- ^{1} Rankings are as of 30 October 2017.

=== Other entrants ===
The following players received wildcards into the singles main draw:

- (France) Geoffrey Blancaneaux
- (France) Ugo Humbert
- (France) Tom Jomby
- (France) Benoît Paire

The following players received entry from the qualifying draw:

- (Belarus) Ilya Ivashka
- (France) Maxime Janvier
- (France) Constant Lestienne
- (Belgium) Yannik Reuter

The following player received entry as a lucky loser:

- (Belgium) Romain Barbosa

== Champions ==
=== Singles ===
- (Sweden) Elias Ymer def. (Germany) Yannick Maden 7–5, 6–4.

=== Doubles ===
- (Germany) Andre Begemann / (France) Jonathan Eysseric def. (Poland) Tomasz Bednarek / (Netherlands) David Pel 6–3, 6–4.
