= 2019 Internationaux de Tennis de Vendée – Singles =

Singles
- 2019 Internationaux de Tennis de Vendée

Final
- Champion: (Sweden) Mikael Ymer
- Runner-up: (France) Mathias Bourgue
- Score: 6–1, 6–4

Events
Singles	Doubles
← 2018 ·	Internationaux de Tennis de Vendée	· 2021 →

Elias Ymer was the defending champion but chose not to defend his title.

Mikael Ymer won the title after defeating Mathias Bourgue 6–1, 6–4 in the final.

== Seeds ==
All seeds receive a bye into the second round.

1. (France) Ugo Humbert (third round)
2. (France) Grégoire Barrère (second round)
3. (Sweden) Mikael Ymer (champion)
4. (Poland) Kamil Majchrzak (second round)
5. (Italy) Stefano Travaglia (third round)
6. (Romania) Marius Copil (quarterfinals)
7. (France) Corentin Moutet (second round)
8. (Switzerland) Henri Laaksonen (quarterfinals)
9. (France) Antoine Hoang (quarterfinals)
10. (Italy) Paolo Lorenzi (third round)
11. (Slovakia) Norbert Gombos (second round)
12. (Italy) Gianluca Mager (third round)
13. (Austria) Dennis Novak (quarterfinals)
14. (Italy) Jannik Sinner (semifinals)
15. (Czech Republic) Jiří Veselý (semifinals)
16. (Latvia) Ernests Gulbis (second round, retired)

== Draw ==
=== Key ===
- Q = Qualifier
- WC = Wild card
- LL = Lucky loser
- Alt = Alternate
- SE = Special exempt
- PR = Protected ranking
- ITF = ITF entry
- JE = Junior exempt
- w/o = Walkover
- r = Retired
- d = Defaulted
- SR = Special ranking

=== Finals ===
Quarterfinals
15	(Czech Republic) Jiří Veselý	6	6
8	(Switzerland) Henri Laaksonen	2	3
3	(Sweden) Mikael Ymer	6	6
9	(France) Antoine Hoang	3	4
(France) Mathias Bourgue	6	7^{7}
13	(Austria) Dennis Novak	3	6^{1}
6	(Romania) Marius Copil	6	1	4
14	(Italy) Jannik Sinner	3	6	6

Semifinals
15	(Czech Republic) Jiří Veselý	3	2
3	(Sweden) Mikael Ymer	6	6
(France) Mathias Bourgue	6	4	7^{8}
14	(Italy) Jannik Sinner	4	6	6^{6}

Final
3	(Sweden) Mikael Ymer	6	6
(France) Mathias Bourgue	1	4

=== Top half ===
==== Section 1 ====
First round
(Netherlands) R Haase	6	6
(France) M Janvier	3	3
WC	(France) H Grenier	4	6	4
(Germany) D Masur	6	3	6
(Canada) S Diez	6	4
(Spain) B Zapata Miralles	2	1^{d}
(Spain) C Taberner	6	6
(Spain) E López Pérez	4	2

Second round
1	(France) U Humbert	6	6
(Netherlands) R Haase	2	1
(Germany) D Masur	4	6	6^{7}
15	(Czech Republic) J Veselý	6	3	7^{9}
12	(Italy) G Mager	6	6
(Canada) S Diez	1	2
(Spain) C Taberner	6^{4}	4
8	(Switzerland) H Laaksonen	7^{7}	6

Third round
1	(France) U Humbert	4	6^{8}
15	(Czech Republic) J Veselý	6	7^{10}
12	(Italy) G Mager	6^{3}	1
8	(Switzerland) H Laaksonen	7^{7}	6

Quarterfinals
15	(Czech Republic) J Veselý	6	6
8	(Switzerland) H Laaksonen	2	3

==== Section 2 ====
First round
Alt	(Italy) L Vanni	2	7^{7}	6
WC	(France) G Blancaneaux	6	6^{3}	2
(Germany) O Otte	6	6
(France) M Guinard	3	2
(Ukraine) S Stakhovsky	7	7
(France) C Lestienne	5	5
(France) E Benchetrit	4	6	3
(Italy) R Marcora	6	1	6

Second round
3	(Sweden) M Ymer	6	6^{5}	6
Alt	(Italy) L Vanni	3	7^{7}	1
(Germany) O Otte	2	7^{7}	2
16	(Latvia) E Gulbis	6	6^{5}	0^{r}
9	(France) A Hoang	6	3	6
(Ukraine) S Stakhovsky	3	6	4
(Italy) R Marcora	6^{5}	6	2
5	(Italy) S Travaglia	7^{7}	4	6

Third round
3	(Sweden) M Ymer	6	1	7^{8}
(Germany) O Otte	3	6	6^{6}
9	(France) A Hoang	6	7^{7}
5	(Italy) S Travaglia	2	6^{4}

Quarterfinals
3	(Sweden) M Ymer	6	6
9	(France) A Hoang	3	4

=== Bottom half ===
==== Section 3 ====
First round
(France) A Müller	5	6	6
WC	(France) Tom Jomby	7	1	3
(Austria) L Miedler	6^{3}	4
(France) M Bourgue	7^{7}	6
(Germany) T Kamke	6	6^{4}	4
(India) R Ramanathan	2	7^{7}	6
(Germany) C-M Stebe	7	6
(Austria) S Ofner	5	1

Second round
7	(France) C Moutet	6	3	3
(France) A Müller	2	6	6
(France) M Bourgue	6	6
11	(Slovakia) N Gombos	3	4
13	(Austria) D Novak	6	6
(India) R Ramanathan	4	2
(Germany) C-M Stebe	6^{2}	6	6
4/WC	(Poland) K Majchrzak	7^{7}	3	1

Third round
(France) A Müller	4	4
(France) M Bourgue	6	6
13	(Austria) D Novak	7^{7}	6
(Germany) C-M Stebe	6^{5}	3

Quarterfinals
(France) M Bourgue	6	7^{7}
13	(Austria) D Novak	3	6^{1}

==== Section 4 ====
First round
(Germany) M Zverev	7^{8}	6
(United Kingdom) J Ward	6^{6}	3
WC	(France) R Roumane	6	6
(France) Q Halys	4	4
(France) T Lamasine	6	6
(Spain) A Menéndez Maceiras	3	2
(France) V Royer	4	4
(Czech Republic) L Rosol	6	6

Second round
6	(Romania) M Copil	6	6
(Germany) M Zverev	3	3
WC	(France) R Roumane	6^{9}	2
10	(Italy) P Lorenzi	7^{11}	6
14	(Italy) J Sinner	7	6
(France) T Lamasine	5	1
(Czech Republic) L Rosol	7	6
2	(France) G Barrère	5	3

Third round
6	(Romania) M Copil	2	7^{8}	6
10	(Italy) P Lorenzi	6	6^{6}	2
14	(Italy) J Sinner	6^{3}	7	6
(Czech Republic) L Rosol	7^{7}	5	3

Quarterfinals
6	(Romania) M Copil	6	1	4
14	(Italy) J Sinner	3	6	6
