= 2014 Internationaux de Tennis de Vendée – Doubles =

Doubles
- 2014 Internationaux de Tennis de Vendée

Final
- Champions: (France) Pierre-Hugues Herbert (France) Nicolas Mahut
- Runners-up: (Germany) Tobias Kamke (Germany) Philipp Marx
- Score: 6–3, 6–4

Events
Singles	Doubles
← 2013 ·	Internationaux de Tennis de Vendée	· 2015 →

First seeds Pierre-Hugues Herbert and Nicolas Mahut won the title, beating Tobias Kamke and Philipp Marx in the final 6–3, 6–4.

== Seeds ==
1. (France) Pierre-Hugues Herbert / (France) Nicolas Mahut (champions)
2. (Germany) Frank Moser / (Germany) Alexander Satschko (first round)
3. (United States) James Cerretani / (Poland) Mateusz Kowalczyk (first round)
4. (France) Fabrice Martin / (Sweden) Andreas Siljeström (first round)

== Draw ==
=== Key ===
- Q = Qualifier
- WC = Wild card
- LL = Lucky loser
- Alt = Alternate
- SE = Special exempt
- PR = Protected ranking
- ITF = ITF entry
- JE = Junior exempt
- w/o = Walkover
- r = Retired
- d = Defaulted
- SR = Special ranking

=== Draw ===
First round
1	(France) P-H Herbert (France) N Mahut	6	6
(Moldova) R Albot (Romania) V Hănescu	1	3
WC	(France) L Rochette (France) A Sidorenko	4	0
(France) D Guez (France) V Millot	6	6
3	(United States) J Cerretani (Poland) M Kowalczyk	3	5
WC	(France) T Jomby (France) M Lescure	6	7
(Belgium) R Bemelmans (Belgium) N Desein	6	6
(France) O Charroin (Italy) R Ghedin	1	3
(Poland) A Kapaś (Poland) B Koniusz	6	1	[10]
(Russia) V Baluda (Croatia) F Škugor	3	6	[7]
(Ukraine) D Molchanov (Croatia) A Veić	7^{7}	6
4	(France) F Martin (Sweden) A Siljeström	6^{5}	3
(Germany) T Kamke (Germany) P Marx	6	6
(Spain) Í Cervantes (Spain) P Riba	2	1
WC	(France) T Lamasine (France) J Tatlot	6^{9}	7	[10]
2	(Germany) F Moser (Germany) S Satschko	7^{11}	5	[7]

Quarterfinals
1	(France) P-H Herbert (France) N Mahut	6	6
(France) D Guez (France) V Millot	1	2
WC	(France) T Jomby (France) M Lescure	3	2
(Belgium) R Bemelmans (Belgium) N Desein	6	6
(Poland) A Kapaś (Poland) B Koniusz	2	7	[8]
(Ukraine) D Molchanov (Croatia) A Veić	6	5	[10]
(Germany) T Kamke (Germany) P Marx	6	4	[10]
WC	(France) T Lamasine (France) J Tatlot	4	6	[6]

Semifinals
1	(France) P-H Herbert (France) N Mahut	6	6
(Belgium) R Bemelmans (Belgium) N Desein	3	4
(Ukraine) D Molchanov (Croatia) A Veić	6	5	[5]
(Germany) T Kamke (Germany) P Marx	4	7	[10]

Final
1	(France) P-H Herbert (France) N Mahut	6	6
(Germany) T Kamke (Germany) P Marx	3	4
