= 2021 Internationaux de Tennis de Vendée – Doubles =

Doubles
- 2021 Internationaux de Tennis de Vendée

Final
- Champions: (France) Jonathan Eysseric (France) Quentin Halys
- Runners-up: (Netherlands) David Pel (Pakistan) Aisam-ul-Haq Qureshi
- Score: 4–6, 7–6^{(7–5)}, [10–8]

Events
Singles	Doubles
← 2019 ·	Internationaux de Tennis de Vendée	· 2022 →

Jonny O'Mara and Ken Skupski were the defending champions but only O'Mara chose to defend his title, partnering Treat Huey. O'Mara lost in the first round to Antoine Hoang and Kyrian Jacquet.

Jonathan Eysseric and Quentin Halys won the title after defeating David Pel and Aisam-ul-Haq Qureshi 4–6, 7–6^{(7–5)}, [10–8] in the final.

== Seeds ==
1. (Netherlands) David Pel / (Pakistan) Aisam-ul-Haq Qureshi (final)
2. (Monaco) Romain Arneodo / (Monaco) Hugo Nys (quarterfinals)
3. (United States) Nathaniel Lammons / (Australia) Matt Reid (semifinals)
4. (Philippines) Treat Huey / (United Kingdom) Jonny O'Mara (first round)

== Draw ==
=== Key ===
- Q = Qualifier
- WC = Wild card
- LL = Lucky loser
- Alt = Alternate
- SE = Special exempt
- PR = Protected ranking
- ITF = ITF entry
- JE = Junior exempt
- w/o = Walkover
- r = Retired
- d = Defaulted
- SR = Special ranking

First round
(France) A Olivetti (United States) H Reese	3	6	[10]
(Germany) A Begemann (Slovakia) I Zelenay	6	3	[8]
4	(Philippines) T Huey (United Kingdom) J O'Mara	3	3
(France) A Hoang (France) K Jacquet	6	6
(United States) R Galloway (United States) A Lawson	7	6
(Poland) K Drzewiecki (Poland) K Majchrzak	5	3
WC	(France) T Droguet (France) H Mayot	6	6
(Poland) S Walków (Poland) J Zieliński	4	4
(India) S Balaji (India) D Sharan	4	6	[6]
(France) J Eysseric (France) Q Halys	6	3	[10]

Quarterfinals
1	(Netherlands) D Pel (Pakistan) A-u-H Qureshi	5	7^{7}	[10]
(France) A Olivetti (United States) H Reese	7	6^{3}	[8]
(France) A Hoang (France) K Jacquet	5	4
(United States) R Galloway (United States) A Lawson	7	6
WC	(France) T Droguet (France) H Mayot	2	4
3	(United States) N Lammons (Australia) M Reid	6	6
(France) J Eysseric (France) Q Halys	7^{7}	6
2	(Monaco) R Arneodo (Monaco) H Nys	6^{3}	1

Semifinals
1	(Netherlands) D Pel (Pakistan) A-u-H Qureshi	6	6
(United States) R Galloway (United States) A Lawson	2	4
3	(United States) N Lammons (Australia) M Reid	6^{1}	5
(France) J Eysseric (France) Q Halys	7^{7}	7

Final
1	(Netherlands) D Pel (Pakistan) A-u-H Qureshi	6	6^{5}	[8]
(France) J Eysseric (France) Q Halys	4	7^{7}	[10]
