= 2015 Internationaux de Tennis de Vendée =

- Date: 9–15 November
- Edition: 3rd
- Surface: Hard
- Location: Mouilleron-le-Captif, France

Champions

Singles
- (France) Benoît Paire

Doubles
- (Netherlands) Sander Arends / (Poland) Adam Majchrowicz
← 2014 ·	Internationaux de Tennis de Vendée	· 2016 →

The 2015 Internationaux de Tennis de Vendée was a professional tennis tournament played on hard courts. It was the third edition of the tournament which was part of the 2015 ATP Challenger Tour. It took place in Mouilleron-le-Captif, France between 9 and 15 November 2015.

== Singles main-draw entrants ==
=== Seeds ===
Country	Player	Rank^{1}	Seed
FRA	Benoît Paire	23	1
FRA	Adrian Mannarino	42	2
RUS	Teymuraz Gabashvili	50	3
UKR	Sergiy Stakhovsky	61	4
FRA	Lucas Pouille	84	5
ESP	Marcel Granollers	88	6
FRA	Paul-Henri Mathieu	98	7
TUR	Marsel İlhan	99	8

- ^{1} Rankings are as of November 2, 2015.

=== Other entrants ===
The following players received wildcards into the singles main draw:

- (France) Maxime Janvier
- (France) Tom Jomby
- (France) Adrian Mannarino
- (France) Benoît Paire

The following player entered the main draw as a protected ranking:

- (Switzerland) Marco Chiudinelli

The following players received entry from the qualifying draw:

- (Netherlands) Jesse Huta Galung
- (Belgium) Yannik Reuter
- (France) Laurent Rochette
- (France) Gleb Sakharov

== Champions ==
=== Singles ===
- (France) Benoît Paire def. (France) Lucas Pouille 6–4, 1–6, 7–6^{(9–7)}

=== Doubles ===
- (Netherlands) Sander Arends / (Poland) Adam Majchrowicz def. (Belarus) Aliaksandr Bury / (Sweden) Andreas Siljeström 6–3, 5–7, [10–8]
