= 2013 Internationaux de Tennis de Vendée =

- Date: 14–20 October
- Edition: 1st
- Surface: Hard
- Location: Mouilleron-le-Captif, France

Champions

Singles
- (Germany) Michael Berrer

Doubles
- (France) Fabrice Martin / (France) Hugo Nys
| Internationaux de Tennis de Vendée | · 2014 → |

The 2013 Internationaux de Tennis de Vendée is a professional tennis tournament played on hard courts. It is the first edition of the tournament which was part of the 2013 ATP Challenger Tour. It is taking place in Mouilleron-le-Captif, France between 14 and 20 October 2013.

== Singles main-draw entrants ==
=== Seeds ===
| Country | Player | Rank^{1} | Seed |
|---|---|---|---|
| FRA | Michaël Llodra | 57 | 1 |
| FRA | Nicolas Mahut | 69 | 2 |
| FRA | Guillaume Rufin | 94 | 3 |
| FRA | Marc Gicquel | 105 | 4 |
| CAN | Frank Dancevic | 137 | 5 |
| UKR | Illya Marchenko | 139 | 6 |
| GER | Dustin Brown | 140 | 7 |
| GER | Michael Berrer | 164 | 8 |

- ^{1} Rankings are as of September 30, 2013.

=== Other entrants ===
The following players received wildcards into the singles main draw:

- (France) Michaël Llodra
- (France) Hugo Nys
- (France) Lucas Pouille
- (France) Maxime Teixeira

The following players received entry from the qualifying draw:

- (Spain) Andrés Artunedo Martinavarr
- (Switzerland) Stéphane Bohli
- (Slovakia) Andrej Martin
- (Germany) Tim Puetz

The following players received entry as a Lucky Loser:

- (France) Vincent Millot

== Champions ==
=== Singles ===
- (Germany) Michael Berrer def. (France) Nicolas Mahut 1–6, 6–4, 6–3

=== Doubles ===
- (France) Fabrice Martin / (France) Hugo Nys def. (Finland) Henri Kontinen / (Spain) Adrián Menéndez Maceiras 3–6, 6–3, [10–8]
