= 2013 Internationaux de Tennis de Vendée – Singles =

Singles
- 2013 Internationaux de Tennis de Vendée

Final
- Champion: (Germany) Michael Berrer
- Runner-up: (France) Nicolas Mahut
- Score: 1–6, 6–4, 6–3

Events
| Singles | Doubles |
| Internationaux de Tennis de Vendée | · 2014 → |

8th seed Michael Berrer won the first edition of the event against Nicolas Mahut in three sets 1–6, 6–4, 6–3.

== Seeds ==
1. (France) Michaël Llodra (semifinals)
2. (France) Nicolas Mahut (final)
3. (France) Guillaume Rufin (withdrew)
4. (France) Marc Gicquel (second round)
5. (Canada) Frank Dancevic (first round)
6. (Ukraine) Illya Marchenko (first round)
7. (Germany) Dustin Brown (quarterfinals)
8. (Germany) Michael Berrer (champion)

== Draw ==
=== Key ===
- Q = Qualifier
- WC = Wild card
- LL = Lucky loser
- Alt = Alternate
- ITF = ITF entry
- PR = Protected ranking
- SR = Special ranking
- SE = Special exempt
- JE = Junior exempt
- JR = Junior Accelerator Programme entrant
- CO = College Accelerator Programme entrant
- NG = Next Gen Accelerator Program entrant
- w/o = Walkover
- r = Retired
- d = Defaulted

=== Finals ===
Semifinals
1/WC | (France) Michaël Llodra | 4 | 3
8 | (Germany) Michael Berrer | 6 | 6
(Germany) Andreas Beck | 4 | 3
2 | (France) Nicolas Mahut | 6 | 6

Final
8 | (Germany) Michael Berrer | 1 | 6 | 6
2 | (France) Nicolas Mahut | 6 | 4 | 3

=== Top half ===
First round
1/WC | (France) M Llodra | 6 | 6
(Italy) A Arnaboldi | 3 | 2
(France) P-H Herbert | 6 | 6
WC | (France) H Nys | 3 | 2
(Spain) A Menéndez-Maceiras | 7 | 3 | 3
(Switzerland) H Laaksonen | 5 | 6 | 6
WC | (France) L Pouille | 4 | 3
7 | (Germany) D Brown | 6 | 6
4 | (France) M Gicquel | 7^{7} | 6
(Belgium) G Gigounon | 6^{5} | 3
(France) G Burquier | 6 | 6
(Uzbekistan) F Dustov | 3 | 2
Q | (Germany) T Puetz | 4 | 2
(Italy) F Cipolla | 6 | 6
(Netherlands) T Schoorel | 1 | 3
8 | (Germany) M Berrer | 6 | 6

Second round
1/WC | (France) M Llodra | 6^{2} | 6 | 6
(France) P-H Herbert | 7^{7} | 4 | 1
(Switzerland) H Laaksonen | 2 | 6^{3}
7 | (Germany) D Brown | 6 | 7^{7}
4 | (France) M Gicquel | 4 | 6^{5}
(France) G Burquier | 6 | 7^{7}
(Italy) F Cipolla | 6 | 3 | 3
8 | (Germany) M Berrer | 3 | 6 | 6

Quarterfinals
1/WC | (France) M Llodra | 4 | 6 | 6
7 | (Germany) D Brown | 6 | 3 | 2
(France) G Burquier | 3 | 2
8 | (Germany) M Berrer | 6 | 6

Semifinals
1/WC | (France) M Llodra | 4 | 3
8 | (Germany) M Berrer | 6 | 6

=== Bottom half ===
First round
6 | (Ukraine) I Marchenko | 3 | 6 | 2
(France) J Ouanna | 6 | 1 | 6
(Belgium) M Authom | 4 | 4
(France) F Serra | 6 | 6
(Germany) A Beck | 6 | 6
Q | (Slovakia) A Martin | 0 | 1
(Italy) L Giustino | 6 | 6
LL | (France) V Millot | 3 | 4
5 | (Canada) F Dancevic | 3 | 7^{7} | 3
(France) D Guez | 6 | 6^{3} | 6
Q | (Switzerland) S Bohli | 5 | 4
WC | (France) M Teixeira | 7 | 6
Q | (Spain) A Artunedo Martinavarr | 4 | 4
(Germany) B Phau | 6 | 6
(Slovakia) N Gombos | 2 | 3
2 | (France) N Mahut | 6 | 6

Second round
(France) J Ouanna | 6 | 6
(France) F Serra | 4 | 2
(Germany) A Beck | 6 | 6
(Italy) L Giustino | 4 | 2
(France) D Guez | 5 | 4
WC | (France) M Teixeira | 7 | 6
(Germany) B Phau | 4 | 4
2 | (France) N Mahut | 6 | 6

Quarterfinals
(France) J Ouanna | 1 | 4
(Germany) A Beck | 6 | 6
WC | (France) M Teixeira | 6^{5} | 5
2 | (France) N Mahut | 7^{7} | 7

Semifinals
(Germany) A Beck | 4 | 3
2 | (France) N Mahut | 6 | 6
