= 2021 Internationaux de Tennis de Vendée – Singles =

Singles
- 2021 Internationaux de Tennis de Vendée

Final
- Champion: (Czech Republic) Jiří Veselý
- Runner-up: (Slovakia) Norbert Gombos
- Score: 6–4, 6–4

Events
Singles	Doubles
← 2019 ·	Internationaux de Tennis de Vendée	· 2022 →

Mikael Ymer was the defending champion but chose not to defend his title.

Jiří Veselý won the title after defeating Norbert Gombos 6–4, 6–4 in the final.

== Seeds ==
1. (France) Benjamin Bonzi (first round)
2. (Czech Republic) Jiří Veselý (champion)
3. (Germany) Peter Gojowczyk (first round)
4. (Italy) Andreas Seppi (semifinals)
5. (France) Gilles Simon (first round, withdrew)
6. (France) Pierre-Hugues Herbert (quarterfinals)
7. (Lithuania) Ričardas Berankis (second round)
8. (Slovakia) Norbert Gombos (final)

== Draw ==
=== Key ===
- Q = Qualifier
- WC = Wild card
- LL = Lucky loser
- Alt = Alternate
- SE = Special exempt
- PR = Protected ranking
- ITF = ITF entry
- JE = Junior exempt
- w/o = Walkover
- r = Retired
- d = Defaulted
- SR = Special ranking

=== Finals ===
Semifinals
Q	(Germany) Mats Rosenkranz	4	6^{4}
8	(Slovakia) Norbert Gombos	6	7^{7}
4	(Italy) Andreas Seppi	4	6^{1}
2	(Czech Republic) Jiří Veselý	6	7^{7}

Final
8	(Slovakia) Norbert Gombos	4	4
2	(Czech Republic) Jiří Veselý	6	6

=== Top half ===
First round
1	(France) B Bonzi	6^{4}	4
Q	(Germany) M Rosenkranz	7^{7}	6
(Poland) K Majchrzak	7^{7}	3	6
Q	(Russia) E Karlovskiy	6^{5}	6	3
(Belgium) R Bemelmans	3	6	5
Alt	(France) C Lestienne	6	3	7
WC	(France) K Jacquet	1	3
6	(France) P-H Herbert	6	6
3	(Germany) P Gojowczyk	3	6	3
(Austria) D Novak	6	4	6
(France) L Pouille	2	6^{2}
(Sweden) E Ymer	6	7^{7}
(Germany) T Kamke	2	6^{3}
LL	(France) K de Schepper	6	7^{7}
(Russia) R Safiullin	4	5
8	(Slovakia) N Gombos	6	7

Second round
Q	(Germany) M Rosenkranz	6	3
(Poland) K Majchrzak	4	1^{r}
Alt	(France) C Lestienne	6	6^{5}	4
6	(France) P-H Herbert	3	7^{7}	6
(Austria) D Novak	7^{7}	6
(Sweden) E Ymer	6^{1}	4
LL	(France) K de Schepper	6^{1}	6^{4}
8	(Slovakia) N Gombos	7^{7}	7^{7}

Quarterfinals
Q	(Germany) M Rosenkranz	6^{2}	6	7^{7}
6	(France) P-H Herbert	7^{7}	3	6^{4}
(Austria) D Novak	6	3	2
8	(Slovakia) N Gombos	4	6	6

Semifinals
Q	(Germany) M Rosenkranz	4	6^{4}
8	(Slovakia) N Gombos	6	7^{7}

=== Bottom half ===
First round
7	(Lithuania) R Berankis	7^{7}	6
Q	(France) T Droguet	6^{0}	2
(France) Q Halys	7	7^{7}
(France) G Barrère	5	6^{5}
(Czech Republic) T Macháč	6	6
(Croatia) B Gojo	2	4
(Spain) F Verdasco	5	1
4	(Italy) A Seppi	7	6
5	(France) G Simon
(Germany) M Moraing	w/o
WC	(France) A Fils	6^{2}	3
Q	(Belgium) Z Bergs	7^{7}	6
(France) A Hoang	6^{4}	3
WC	(France) H Mayot	7^{7}	6
(Portugal) F Ferreira Silva	6	3	2
2	(Czech Republic) J Veselý	3	6	6

Second round
7	(Lithuania) R Berankis	6^{4}	5
(France) Q Halys	7^{7}	7
(Czech Republic) T Macháč	6^{3}	6	4
4	(Italy) A Seppi	7^{7}	4	6
(Germany) M Moraing	6	6^{2}	6
Q	(Belgium) Z Bergs	4	7^{7}	4
WC	(France) H Mayot	2	4
2	(Czech Republic) J Veselý	6	6

Quarterfinals
(France) Q Halys	6	6^{6}	3
4	(Italy) A Seppi	2	7^{8}	6
(Germany) M Moraing	1^{r}
2	(Czech Republic) J Veselý	4

Semifinals
4	(Italy) A Seppi	4	6^{1}
2	(Czech Republic) J Veselý	6	7^{7}
