= 2015 Internationaux de Tennis de Vendée – Singles =

Singles
- 2015 Internationaux de Tennis de Vendée

Final
- Champion: (France) Benoît Paire
- Runner-up: (France) Lucas Pouille
- Score: 6–4, 1–6, 7–6^{(9–7)}

Events
Singles	Doubles
← 2014 ·	Internationaux de Tennis de Vendée	· 2016 →

Benoît Paire won the title, defeating Lucas Pouille in the final 6–4, 1–6, 7–6^{(9–7)} .

== Seeds ==
1. (France) Benoît Paire (champion)
2. (France) Adrian Mannarino (semifinals)
3. (Russia) Teymuraz Gabashvili (quarterfinals)
4. (Ukraine) Sergiy Stakhovsky (quarterfinals)
5. (France) Lucas Pouille (final)
6. (Spain) Marcel Granollers (quarterfinals)
7. (France) Paul-Henri Mathieu (semifinals)
8. (Turkey) Marsel İlhan (second round)

== Draw ==
=== Key ===
- Q = Qualifier
- WC = Wild card
- LL = Lucky loser
- Alt = Alternate
- SE = Special exempt
- PR = Protected ranking
- ITF = ITF entry
- JE = Junior exempt
- w/o = Walkover
- r = Retired
- d = Defaulted
- SR = Special ranking

=== Finals ===
Semifinals
1/WC	(France) Benoît Paire	6	1	6
7	(France) Paul-Henri Mathieu	2	6	1
5	(France) Lucas Pouille	6	7^{7}
2/WC	(France) Adrian Mannarino	0	6^{5}

Final
1/WC	(France) Benoît Paire	6	1	7^{9}
5	(France) Lucas Pouille	4	6	6^{7}

=== Top half ===
First round
1/WC	(France) B Paire	6	7^{7}
(France) C Lestienne	4	6^{4}
(France) M Teixeira	3	4
WC	(France) M Janvier	6	6
(France) Sebastien Boltz	4	4
(Czech Republic) J Mertl	6	6
Q	(Netherlands) J Huta Galung	4	0
6	(Spain) M Granollers	6	6
3	(Russia) T Gabashvili	6	7^{7}
(France) G Barrère	1	6^{4}
Q	(France) G Sakharov	6	7
(Germany) T Kamke	4	5
(France) C Hemery	6	6
WC	(France) Tom Jomby	4	4
(Belgium) A De Greef	3	4
7	(France) P-H Mathieu	6	6

Second round
1/WC	(France) B Paire	6	6
WC	(France) M Janvier	4	4
(Czech Republic) J Mertl	3	6	2
6	(Spain) M Granollers	6	3	6
3	(Russia) T Gabashvili	6	6
Q	(France) G Sakharov	3	2
(France) C Hemery	2	3
7	(France) P-H Mathieu	6	6

Quarterfinals
1/WC	(France) B Paire	6	2	6
6	(Spain) M Granollers	2	6	2
3	(Russia) T Gabashvili	6^{6}	2
7	(France) P-H Mathieu	7^{8}	6

Semifinals
1/WC	(France) B Paire	6	1	6
7	(France) P-H Mathieu	2	6	1

=== Bottom half ===
First round
5	(France) L Pouille	6	5	6
PR	(Switzerland) M Chiudinelli	4	7	4
(France) D Guez	4	6	6
(France) M Hamou	6	3	0
(Moldova) R Albot	7^{7}	3	1
(France) V Millot	6^{2}	6	6
Q	(France) Laurent Rochette	6^{2}	3
4	(Ukraine) S Stakhovsky	7^{7}	6
8	(Turkey) M İlhan	6	6
(Spain) J Samper-Montaña	2	3
(Russia) K Khachanov	6	7^{8}
(Belgium) R Bemelmans	3	6^{6}
(Belgium) M Authom	3	6	2
Q	(Belgium) Y Reuter	6	0	6
(France) J Eysseric	2	6^{2}
2/WC	(France) A Mannarino	6	7^{7}

Second round
5	(France) L Pouille	4	7^{7}	6
(France) D Guez	6	6^{3}	3
(France) V Millot	3	2
4	(Ukraine) S Stakhovsky	6	6
8	(Turkey) M İlhan	4	1
(Russia) K Khachanov	6	6
Q	(Belgium) Y Reuter	3	6^{2}
2/WC	(France) A Mannarino	6	7^{7}

Quarterfinals
5	(France) L Pouille	6	6
4	(Ukraine) S Stakhovsky	1	4
(Russia) K Khachanov	6	2	5
2/WC	(France) A Mannarino	2	6	7

Semifinals
5	(France) L Pouille	6	7^{7}
2/WC	(France) A Mannarino	0	6^{5}
