= 2017 Internationaux de Tennis de Vendée – Singles =

Singles
- 2017 Internationaux de Tennis de Vendée

Final
- Champion: (Sweden) Elias Ymer
- Runner-up: (Germany) Yannick Maden
- Score: 7–5, 6–4

Events
Singles	Doubles
← 2016 ·	Internationaux de Tennis de Vendée	· 2018 →

Julien Benneteau was the defending champion but chose not to defend his title.

Elias Ymer won the title after defeating Yannick Maden 7–5, 6–4 in the final.

== Seeds ==
1. (France) Benoît Paire (first round, retired)
2. (Germany) Peter Gojowczyk (quarterfinals)
3. (Spain) Guillermo García López (withdrew)
4. (Belgium) Ruben Bemelmans (first round)
5. (Tunisia) Malek Jaziri (first round)
6. (Germany) Maximilian Marterer (first round, retired)
7. (Kazakhstan) Alexander Bublik (second round)
8. (Italy) Stefano Travaglia (second round)
9. (Spain) Tommy Robredo (first round)

== Draw ==
=== Key ===
- Q = Qualifier
- WC = Wild card
- LL = Lucky loser
- Alt = Alternate
- SE = Special exempt
- PR = Protected ranking
- ITF = ITF entry
- JE = Junior exempt
- w/o = Walkover
- r = Retired
- d = Defaulted
- SR = Special ranking

=== Finals ===
Semifinals
(France) Gleb Sakharov	6	4	1
(Sweden) Elias Ymer	3	6	6
(Italy) Luca Vanni	2	4
(Germany) Yannick Maden	6	6

Final
(Sweden) Elias Ymer	7	6
(Germany) Yannick Maden	5	4

=== Top half ===
First round
1/WC	(France) B Paire	6	5^{r}
LL	(Belgium) Romain Barbosa	1	4
(France) G Sakharov	7^{7}	7
(France) M Bourgue	6^{5}	5
Q	(France) M Janvier	6	6
(Italy) S Caruso	2	1
Q	(Belarus) I Ivashka	4	6	4
6	(Germany) M Marterer	6	1	1^{r}
4	(Belgium) R Bemelmans	3	6^{4}
(Croatia) V Galović	6	7^{7}
(Serbia) N Milojević	3	6^{7}
(Sweden) E Ymer	6	7^{9}
(France) V Millot	1	0
(Germany) T Kamke	6	6
Q	(France) C Lestienne	6	7^{7}
5	(Tunisia) M Jaziri	3	6^{3}

Second round
LL	(Belgium) R Barbosa	4	5
(France) G Sakharov	6	7
Q	(France) M Janvier	7	3	6^{1}
Q	(Belarus) I Ivashka	5	6	7^{7}
(Croatia) V Galović	4	1
(Sweden) E Ymer	6	6
(Germany) T Kamke	6	3	3
Q	(France) C Lestienne	4	6	6

Quarterfinals
(France) G Sakharov	7	6
Q	(Belarus) I Ivashka	5	4
(Sweden) E Ymer	6	4	6
Q	(France) C Lestienne	3	6	3

Semifinals
(France) G Sakharov	6	4	1
(Sweden) E Ymer	3	6	6

=== Bottom half ===
First round
8	(Italy) S Travaglia	6^{3}	7	7^{7}
WC	(France) U Humbert	7^{7}	5	6^{2}
WC	(France) G Blancaneaux	2	4
(Italy) L Vanni	6	6
(Italy) A Arnaboldi	3	1
(Russia) A Vatutin	6	6
Q	(Belgium) Y Reuter	6	6
9	(Spain) T Robredo	4	2
7	(Kazakhstan) A Bublik	6	6
(France) C Moutet	4	3
(Australia) A De Minaur	3	2
(Germany) Y Maden	6	6
(Czech Republic) Z Kolář	4	6	7^{7}
WC	(France) Tom Jomby	6	2	6^{3}
(France) K de Schepper	4	6	3
2	(Germany) P Gojowczyk	6	3	6

Second round
8	(Italy) S Travaglia	6^{4}	6^{3}
(Italy) L Vanni	7^{7}	7^{7}
(Russia) A Vatutin	7	6
Q	(Belgium) Y Reuter	5	1
7	(Kazakhstan) A Bublik	6^{4}	2
(Germany) Y Maden	7^{7}	6
(Czech Republic) Z Kolář	4	2
2	(Germany) P Gojowczyk	6	6

Quarterfinals
(Italy) L Vanni	6	6
(Russia) A Vatutin	3	4
(Germany) Y Maden	6	6
2	(Germany) P Gojowczyk	3	4

Semifinals
(Italy) L Vanni	2	4
(Germany) Y Maden	6	6
