= 2017 Internationaux de Tennis de Vendée – Doubles =

Doubles
- 2017 Internationaux de Tennis de Vendée

Final
- Champions: (Germany) Andre Begemann (France) Jonathan Eysseric
- Runners-up: (Poland) Tomasz Bednarek (Netherlands) David Pel
- Score: 6–3, 6–4

Events
Singles	Doubles
← 2016 ·	Internationaux de Tennis de Vendée	· 2018 →

Jonathan Eysseric and Édouard Roger-Vasselin were the defending champions but only Eysseric chose to defend his title, partnering Andre Begemann. Eysseric successfully defended his title, defeating Tomasz Bednarek and David Pel 6–3, 6–4 in the final.

== Seeds ==
1. (Netherlands) Wesley Koolhof / (New Zealand) Artem Sitak (semifinals)
2. (Germany) Andre Begemann / (France) Jonathan Eysseric (champions)
3. (Belgium) Sander Gillé / (Belgium) Joran Vliegen (quarterfinals)
4. (Croatia) Marin Draganja / (Croatia) Tomislav Draganja (first round)

== Draw ==
=== Key ===
- Q = Qualifier
- WC = Wild card
- LL = Lucky loser
- Alt = Alternate
- SE = Special exempt
- PR = Protected ranking
- ITF = ITF entry
- JE = Junior exempt
- w/o = Walkover
- r = Retired
- d = Defaulted
- SR = Special ranking

First round
(Belarus) A Bury (Sweden) A Siljeström	7^{11}	6
(Serbia) N Milojević (Russia) A Vatutin	6^{9}	4
3	(Belgium) S Gillé (Belgium) J Vliegen	6	7
WC	(France) U Humbert (France) C Lestienne	4	5
(Kazakhstan) A Bublik (Ukraine) V Uzhylovskyi	7^{7}	2	[6]
(Poland) T Bednarek (Netherlands) D Pel	6^{5}	6	[10]
(Italy) A Motti (Italy) S Travaglia	6	6
(France) D Guez (France) V Millot	3	2
WC	(France) Tom Jomby (France) Mick Lescure	6	6
4	(Croatia) M Draganja (Croatia) T Draganja	3	2
(France) H Nys (France) G Sakharov	6^{6}	6^{4}
WC	(France) G Blancaneaux (France) A Hoang	7^{8}	7^{7}
(Germany) P Gojowczyk (Germany) A Satschko	6	1	[4]
2	(Germany) A Begemann (France) J Eysseric	2	6	[10]

Quarterfinals
1	(Netherlands) W Koolhof (New Zealand) A Sitak	6	6
(Belarus) A Bury (Sweden) A Siljeström	2	1
3	(Belgium) S Gillé (Belgium) J Vliegen	7^{11}	4	[8]
(Poland) T Bednarek (Netherlands) D Pel	6^{9}	6	[10]
(Italy) A Motti (Italy) S Travaglia	7	6
WC	(France) T Jomby (France) M Lescure	5	4
WC	(France) G Blancaneaux (France) A Hoang	5	3
2	(Germany) A Begemann (France) J Eysseric	7	6

Semifinals
1	(Netherlands) W Koolhof (New Zealand) A Sitak	6	6^{5}	[10]
(Poland) T Bednarek (Netherlands) D Pel	4	7^{7}	[12]
(Italy) A Motti (Italy) S Travaglia	3	3
2	(Germany) A Begemann (France) J Eysseric	6	6

Final
(Poland) T Bednarek (Netherlands) D Pel	3	4
2	(Germany) A Begemann (France) J Eysseric	6	6
