= 2023 Open de Vendée =

- Date: 2–8 October
- Edition: 10th
- Surface: Hard (Indoor)
- Location: Mouilleron-le-Captif, France

Champions

Singles
- (Czech Republic) Tomáš Macháč

Doubles
- (United Kingdom) Julian Cash / (United States) Robert Galloway
- Open de Vendée

The 2023 Open de Vendée was a professional tennis tournament played on hard courts. It was the 10th edition of the tournament which was part of the 2023 ATP Challenger Tour. It took place in Mouilleron-le-Captif, France between 2 and 8 October 2023.

== Singles main-draw entrants ==
=== Seeds ===
| Country | Player | Rank^{1} | Seed |
|---|---|---|---|
| FRA | Hugo Gaston | 89 | 1 |
| SUI | Dominic Stricker | 90 | 2 |
| FRA | Benjamin Bonzi | 98 | 3 |
| BEL | David Goffin | 102 | 4 |
| SUI | Marc-Andrea Hüsler | 103 | 5 |
| USA | Maxime Cressy | 104 | 6 |
| GBR | Jack Draper | 106 | 7 |
| CZE | Tomáš Macháč | 118 | 8 |

- ^{1} Rankings are as of 25 September 2023.

=== Other entrants ===
The following players received wildcards into the singles main draw:

- (France) Pierre-Hugues Herbert
- (France) Matteo Martineau
- (France) Lucas Poullain

The following player received entry into the singles main draw as an alternate:

- (France) Valentin Royer

The following players received entry from the qualifying draw:

- (Switzerland) Rémy Bertola
- (France) Robin Bertrand
- (United Kingdom) Charles Broom
- (United Kingdom) Arthur Fery
- (France) Adrien Gobat
- Evgeny Karlovskiy

== Champions ==
=== Singles ===
- (Czech Republic) Tomáš Macháč def. (United Kingdom) Arthur Fery 6–3, 6–4.

=== Doubles ===
- (United Kingdom) Julian Cash / (United States) Robert Galloway def. (United States) Maxime Cressy / (Finland) Otto Virtanen 6–4, 5–7, [12–10].
