= 2018 Internationaux de Tennis de Vendée =

- Date: 5–11 November
- Edition: 6th
- Surface: Hard
- Location: Mouilleron-le-Captif, France

Champions

Singles
- (Sweden) Elias Ymer

Doubles
- (Belgium) Sander Gillé / (Belgium) Joran Vliegen
← 2017 ·	Internationaux de Tennis de Vendée	· 2019 →

The 2018 Internationaux de Tennis de Vendée was a professional tennis tournament played on hard courts. It was the sixth edition of the tournament which was part of the 2018 ATP Challenger Tour. It took place in Mouilleron-le-Captif, France between 5 and 11 November 2018.

== Singles main-draw entrants ==
=== Seeds ===
Country	Player	Rank^{1}	Seed
FRA	Benoît Paire	56	1
SRB	Laslo Đere	92	2
FRA	Ugo Humbert	99	3
~~CAN~~	~~Félix Auger-Aliassime~~	~~109~~	~~4~~
LTU	Ričardas Berankis	117	5
GER	Yannick Maden	128	6
SWE	Elias Ymer	132	7
ITA	Stefano Travaglia	133	8

- ^{1} Rankings are as of 29 October 2018.

=== Other entrants ===
The following players received wildcards into the singles main draw:

- (France) Mathias Bourgue
- (France) Enzo Couacaud
- (France) Tom Jomby
- (France) Matteo Martineau

The following players received entry into the singles main draw as special exempts:

- (France) Maxime Janvier
- (France) Gleb Sakharov

The following players received entry from the qualifying draw:

- (Belgium) Zizou Bergs
- (Belgium) Joris De Loore
- (Lithuania) Laurynas Grigelis
- (France) Alexandre Müller

The following player received entry as a lucky loser:

- (France) Elliot Benchetrit

== Champions ==
=== Singles ===
- (Sweden) Elias Ymer def. (Germany) Yannick Maden 6–3, 7–6^{(7–5)}.

=== Doubles ===
- (Belgium) Sander Gillé / (Belgium) Joran Vliegen def. (Monaco) Romain Arneodo / (France) Quentin Halys 6–3, 4–6, [10–2].
