= 2023 Open de Vendée – Singles =

Singles
- 2023 Open de Vendée

Final
- Champion: (Czech Republic) Tomáš Macháč
- Runner-up: (United Kingdom) Arthur Fery
- Score: 6–3, 6–4

Events
Singles	Doubles
- Open de Vendée

Jelle Sels was the defending champion but chose not to defend his title.

Tomáš Macháč won the title after defeating Arthur Fery 6–3, 6–4 in the final.

== Seeds ==
1. (France) Hugo Gaston (quarterfinals)
2. (Switzerland) Dominic Stricker (first round)
3. (France) Benjamin Bonzi (second round)
4. (Belgium) David Goffin (second round)
5. (Switzerland) Marc-Andrea Hüsler (first round)
6. (United States) Maxime Cressy (first round)
7. (United Kingdom) Jack Draper (quarterfinals)
8. (Czech Republic) Tomáš Macháč (champion)

== Draw ==
Key

- Q = Qualifier
- WC = Wild card
- LL = Lucky loser
- Alt = Alternate
- ITF = ITF entry
- PR = Protected ranking
- SR = Special ranking
- SE = Special exempt
- JE = Junior exempt
- JR = Junior Accelerator Programme entrant
- CO = College Accelerator Programme entrant
- NG = Next Gen Accelerator Program entrant
- w/o = Walkover
- r = Retired
- d = Defaulted

=== Finals ===
Semifinals
(France) Antoine Escoffier	4	6	4
Q	(United Kingdom) Arthur Fery	6	1	6
8	(Czech Republic) Tomáš Macháč	6	6
WC	(France) Lucas Poullain	4	0

Final
Q	(United Kingdom) Arthur Fery	3	4
8	(Czech Republic) Tomáš Macháč	6	6

=== Top half ===
First round
1	(France) H Gaston	6^{9}	7^{7}	6
(Finland) O Virtanen	7^{11}	6^{4}	2
Alt	(France) V Royer	3	6^{3}
(France) M Bourgue	6	7^{7}
(Canada) G Diallo	6	4	4
(Ukraine) V Sachko	3	6	6
(France) A Escoffier	3	6	6
6	(United States) M Cressy	6	3	2
4	(Belgium) D Goffin	4	6	7^{7}
Q	(United Kingdom) C Broom	6	4	6^{3}
Q	(France) R Bertrand	2	3
Q	(United Kingdom) A Fery	6	6
Q	(Switzerland) R Bertola	4	5
(Italy) G Zeppieri	6	7
Q	E Karlovskiy	6	6
5	(Switzerland) M-A Hüsler	3	4

Second round
1	(France) H Gaston	6	6
(France) M Bourgue	2	0
(Ukraine) V Sachko	6^{4}	3
(France) A Escoffier	7^{7}	6
4	(Belgium) D Goffin	4	6	2
Q	(United Kingdom) A Fery	6	3	6
(Italy) G Zeppieri	6	6
Q	E Karlovskiy	0	3

Quarterfinals
1	(France) H Gaston	1	4
(France) A Escoffier	6	6
Q	(United Kingdom) A Fery	7^{7}	6
(Italy) G Zeppieri	6^{3}	2

Semifinals
(France) A Escoffier	4	6	4
Q	(United Kingdom) A Fery	6	1	6

=== Bottom half ===
First round
8	(Czech Republic) T Macháč	2	7^{7}	6
(Netherlands) G Brouwer	6	6^{2}	2
WC	(France) P-H Herbert	6	6
(Belgium) J De Loore	3	4
Q	(France) Adrien Gobat	2	3
(Italy) L Nardi	6	6
(Ukraine) I Marchenko	6^{2}	6^{3}
3	(France) B Bonzi	7^{7}	7^{7}
7	(United Kingdom) J Draper	6	6
(Czech Republic) J Menšík	4	2
(Croatia) D Prižmić	6	6
(France) D Added	3	1
(France) Jules Marie	1^{r}
WC	(France) L Poullain	1
WC	(France) M Martineau	7^{7}	6
2	(Switzerland) D Stricker	6^{3}	3

Second round
8	(Czech Republic) T Macháč	6	7^{7}
WC	(France) P-H Herbert	4	6^{5}
(Italy) L Nardi	7	6
3	(France) B Bonzi	5	4
7	(United Kingdom) J Draper	6	3	6
(Croatia) D Prižmić	4	6	3
WC	(France) L Poullain	6	5	6
WC	(France) M Martineau	4	7	3

Quarterfinals
8	(Czech Republic) T Macháč	6	6
(Italy) L Nardi	3	4
7	(United Kingdom) J Draper	6^{4}	2
WC	(France) L Poullain	7^{7}	6

Semifinals
8	(Czech Republic) T Macháč	6	6
WC	(France) L Poullain	4	0
