= 2018 Internationaux de Tennis de Vendée – Singles =

Singles
- 2018 Internationaux de Tennis de Vendée

Final
- Champion: (Sweden) Elias Ymer
- Runner-up: (Germany) Yannick Maden
- Score: 6–3, 7–6^{(7–5)}

Events
Singles	Doubles
← 2017 ·	Internationaux de Tennis de Vendée	· 2019 →

Elias Ymer was the defending champion and successfully defended his title, defeating Yannick Maden 6–3, 7–6^{(7–5)} in the final.

== Seeds ==
1. (France) Benoît Paire (second round)
2. (Serbia) Laslo Đere (first round)
3. (France) Ugo Humbert (first round, retired)
4. (Canada) Félix Auger-Aliassime (withdrew)
5. (Lithuania) Ričardas Berankis (second round, withdrew)
6. (Germany) Yannick Maden (final)
7. (Sweden) Elias Ymer (champion)
8. (Italy) Stefano Travaglia (second round)

== Draw ==
=== Key ===
- Q = Qualifier
- WC = Wild card
- LL = Lucky loser
- Alt = Alternate
- SE = Special exempt
- PR = Protected ranking
- ITF = ITF entry
- JE = Junior exempt
- w/o = Walkover
- r = Retired
- d = Defaulted
- SR = Special ranking

=== Finals ===
Semifinals
(Russia) Alexey Vatutin	2	3
6	(Germany) Yannick Maden	6	6
LL	(France) Elliot Benchetrit	4	2
7	(Sweden) Elias Ymer	6	6

Final
6	(Germany) Yannick Maden	3	6^{5}
7	(Sweden) Elias Ymer	6	7^{7}

=== Top half ===
First round
1	(France) B Paire	6	7^{9}
(France) K de Schepper	4	6^{7}
(Egypt) M Safwat	7^{7}	4	2
(Russia) A Vatutin	6^{3}	6	6
(Italy) L Vanni	2	2
SE	(France) M Janvier	6	6
WC	(France) Tom Jomby	5	2
5	(Lithuania) R Berankis	7	6
3	(France) U Humbert	6	3	1^{r}
(Belgium) K Coppejans	3	6	4
(France) C Hemery	4	6^{11}
(Germany) M Moraing	6	7^{13}
WC	(France) M Bourgue	6	7^{7}
Q	(Lithuania) L Grigelis	3	6^{2}
(France) A Hoang	1	2
6	(Germany) Y Maden	6	6

Second round
1	(France) B Paire	6	1	6^{6}
(Russia) A Vatutin	3	6	7^{8}
SE	(France) M Janvier	w/o
5	(Lithuania) R Berankis
(Belgium) K Coppejans	3	3
(Germany) M Moraing	6	6
WC	(France) M Bourgue	2^{r}
6	(Germany) Y Maden	5

Quarterfinals
(Russia) A Vatutin	5	6	6
SE	(France) M Janvier	7	4	1
(Germany) M Moraing	3	3
6	(Germany) Y Maden	6	6

Semifinals
(Russia) A Vatutin	2	3
6	(Germany) Y Maden	6	6

=== Bottom half ===
First round
8	(Italy) S Travaglia	7	6
Q	(Belgium) Z Bergs	5	4
(Italy) S Bolelli	6^{4}	6^{3}
(France) Q Halys	7^{7}	7^{7}
(Croatia) V Galović	6	6
(Spain) P Martínez	3	3
Q	(France) A Müller	3	2
LL	(France) E Benchetrit	6	6
7	(Sweden) E Ymer	6	6
WC	(France) E Couacaud	1	0
SE	(France) G Sakharov	6	6
WC	(France) M Martineau	1	3
(France) C Moutet	3	4
(France) C Lestienne	6	6
Q	(Belgium) J De Loore	6	6
2	(Serbia) L Đere	1	4

Second round
8	(Italy) S Travaglia	3	3
(France) Q Halys	6	6
(Croatia) V Galović	6^{4}	3
LL	(France) E Benchetrit	7^{7}	6
7	(Sweden) E Ymer	4	7^{11}	6
SE	(France) G Sakharov	6	6^{9}	4
(France) C Lestienne	4	6	6
Q	(Belgium) J De Loore	6	0	3

Quarterfinals
(France) Q Halys	5	6	6^{6}
LL	(France) E Benchetrit	7	4	7^{8}
7	(Sweden) E Ymer	5	6	7
(France) C Lestienne	7	4	5

Semifinals
LL	(France) E Benchetrit	4	2
7	(Sweden) E Ymer	6	6
