= 2016 Internationaux de Tennis de Vendée =

- Date: 7–13 November
- Edition: 4th
- Surface: Hard
- Location: Mouilleron-le-Captif, France

Champions

Singles
- (France) Julien Benneteau

Doubles
- (France) Jonathan Eysseric / (France) Édouard Roger-Vasselin
| ← 2015 · | Internationaux de Tennis de Vendée | · 2017 → |

The 2016 Internationaux de Tennis de Vendée was a professional tennis tournament played on hard courts. It was the fourth edition of the tournament which was part of the 2016 ATP Challenger Tour. It took place in Mouilleron-le-Captif, France between 7 and 13 November 2016.

== Singles main-draw entrants ==
=== Seeds ===
| Country | Player | Rank^{1} | Seed |
|---|---|---|---|
| FRA | Benoît Paire | 45 | 1 |
| RUS | Mikhail Youzhny | 51 | 2 |
| FRA | Paul-Henri Mathieu | 67 | 3 |
| RUS | Konstantin Kravchuk | 79 | 4 |
| MDA | Radu Albot | 99 | 5 |
| GEO | Nikoloz Basilashvili | 101 | 6 |
| SUI | Marco Chiudinelli | 116 | 7 |
| GER | Tobias Kamke | 121 | 8 |

- ^{1} Rankings are as of October 31, 2016.

=== Other entrants ===
The following players received wildcards into the singles main draw:

- (Russia) Mikhail Youzhny
- (France) Geoffrey Blancaneaux
- (France) Corentin Moutet
- (France) Benoît Paire

The following player entered the main draw using a special exemption:

- (Australia) Alex De Minaur

The following players received entry from the qualifying draw:

- (Switzerland) Adrien Bossel
- (France) Rémi Boutillier
- (France) Calvin Hemery
- (France) Antoine Hoang

== Champions ==
=== Singles ===
- (France) Julien Benneteau def. (Russia) Andrey Rublev, 7–5, 2–6, 6–3.

=== Doubles ===
- (France) Jonathan Eysseric / (France) Édouard Roger-Vasselin def. (Sweden) Johan Brunström / (Sweden) Andreas Siljeström 6–7^{(1–7)}, 7–6^{(7–3)}, [11–9].
