= 2021 Internationaux de Tennis de Vendée =

- Date: 4–10 October
- Edition: 8th
- Surface: Hard (Indoor)
- Location: Mouilleron-le-Captif, France

Champions

Singles
- (Czech Republic) Jiří Veselý

Doubles
- (France) Jonathan Eysseric / (France) Quentin Halys
← 2019 ·	Internationaux de Tennis de Vendée	· 2022 →

The 2021 Internationaux de Tennis de Vendée was a professional tennis tournament played on hard courts. It was the eighth edition of the tournament which was part of the 2021 ATP Challenger Tour. It took place in Mouilleron-le-Captif, France between 4 and 10 October 2021.

== Singles main-draw entrants ==
=== Seeds ===
Country	Player	Rank^{1}	Seed
FRA	Benjamin Bonzi	64	1
CZE	Jiří Veselý	86	2
GER	Peter Gojowczyk	87	3
ITA	Andreas Seppi	95	4
~~FRA~~	~~Gilles Simon~~	~~99~~	~~5~~
FRA	Pierre-Hugues Herbert	100	6
LTU	Ričardas Berankis	106	7
SVK	Norbert Gombos	114	8

- ^{1} Rankings are as of 27 September 2021.

=== Other entrants ===
The following players received wildcards into the singles main draw:

- (France) Arthur Fils
- (France) Kyrian Jacquet
- (France) Harold Mayot

The following player received entry into the singles main draw as an alternate:

- (France) Constant Lestienne

The following players received entry from the qualifying draw:

- (Belgium) Zizou Bergs
- (France) Titouan Droguet
- (Russia) Evgeny Karlovskiy
- (Germany) Mats Rosenkranz

The following player received entry as a lucky loser:

- (France) Kenny de Schepper

== Champions ==
=== Singles ===
- (Czech Republic) Jiří Veselý def. (Slovakia) Norbert Gombos 6–4, 6–4.

=== Doubles ===
- (France) Jonathan Eysseric / (France) Quentin Halys def. (Netherlands) David Pel / (Pakistan) Aisam-ul-Haq Qureshi 4–6, 7–6^{(7–5)}, [10–8].
