= 2025 Open de Vendée =

- Date: 29 September – 5 October
- Edition: 12th
- Surface: Hard (Indoor)
- Location: Mouilleron-le-Captif, France

Champions

Singles
- (Norway) Nicolai Budkov Kjær

Doubles
- (France) Grégoire Jacq / (France) Albano Olivetti
- Open de Vendée

The 2025 Open de Vendée was a professional tennis tournament played on hard courts. It was the 12th edition of the tournament which was part of the 2025 ATP Challenger Tour. It took place in Mouilleron-le-Captif, France between 29 September and 5 October 2025.

== Singles main-draw entrants ==
=== Seeds ===
Country	Player	Rank^{1}	Seed
BEL	Raphaël Collignon	93	1
FRA	Hugo Gaston	105	2
BEL	Alexander Blockx	121	3
ITA	Francesco Passaro	139	4
FRA	Pierre-Hugues Herbert	141	5
~~EST~~	~~Mark Lajal~~	~~145~~	~~6~~
NOR	Nicolai Budkov Kjær	155	7
CAN	Alexis Galarneau	180	8

- ^{1} Rankings are as of 22 September 2025.

=== Other entrants ===
The following players received wildcards into the singles main draw:

- (France) Geoffrey Blancaneaux
- (France) Mickael Kaouk
- (France) Loann Massard

The following player received entry into the singles main draw using a protected ranking:

- (Finland) Emil Ruusuvuori

The following player received entry into the singles main draw through the Junior Accelerator programme:

- (Netherlands) Mees Röttgering

The following player received entry into the singles main draw through the Next Gen Accelerator programme:

- (United Kingdom) Henry Searle

The following player received entry into the singles main draw as an alternate:

- (France) Matteo Martineau

The following players received entry from the qualifying draw:

- (Switzerland) Rémy Bertola
- (United Kingdom) Stuart Parker
- (France) Lucas Poullain
- (Netherlands) Jelle Sels
- (United Kingdom) Hamish Stewart
- Nikolay Vylegzhanin

The following player received entry as a lucky loser:

- (Latvia) Robert Strombachs

== Champions ==
=== Singles ===
- (Norway) Nicolai Budkov Kjær def. (United States) Patrick Kypson 6–0, 6–3.

=== Doubles ===
- (France) Grégoire Jacq / (France) Albano Olivetti def. (United Kingdom) Hamish Stewart / (United Kingdom) Harry Wendelken 7–6^{(7–5)}, 6–3.
