= 2016 Internationaux de Tennis de Vendée – Singles =

Singles
- 2016 Internationaux de Tennis de Vendée
- 2015 Champion: (France) Julien Benneteau

Final
- Champion: (Russia) Andrey Rublev
- Score: 7–5, 2–6, 6–3

Events
Singles	Doubles
← 2015 ·	Internationaux de Tennis de Vendée	· 2017 →

Benoît Paire was the defending champion but lost in the semifinals to Andrey Rublev.

Julien Benneteau won the title after defeating Rublev 7–5, 2–6, 6–3 in the final.

== Seeds ==
1. (France) Benoît Paire (semifinals)
2. (Russia) Mikhail Youzhny (first round)
3. (France) Paul-Henri Mathieu (first round)
4. (Russia) Konstantin Kravchuk (second round)
5. (Moldova) Radu Albot (second round)
6. (Georgia (country)) Nikoloz Basilashvili (first round)
7. (Switzerland) Marco Chiudinelli (second round)
8. (Germany) Tobias Kamke (first round)

== Draw ==
=== Key ===
- Q = Qualifier
- WC = Wild card
- LL = Lucky loser
- Alt = Alternate
- SE = Special exempt
- PR = Protected ranking
- ITF = ITF entry
- JE = Junior exempt
- w/o = Walkover
- r = Retired
- d = Defaulted
- SR = Special ranking

=== Finals ===
Semifinals
1/WC	(France) Benoît Paire	3	6^{13}
(Russia) Andrey Rublev	6	7^{15}
(Germany) Peter Gojowczyk	6^{5}	6^{6}
(France) Julien Benneteau	7^{7}	7^{8}

Final
(Russia) Andrey Rublev	5	6	3
(France) Julien Benneteau	7	2	6

=== Top half ===
First round
1/WC	(France) B Paire	6	6
(France) J Eysseric	4	3
(Spain) E López-Pérez	3	6	6
(France) G Barrère	6	4	3
(France) É Roger-Vasselin	6	6^{6}	6
(Japan) A Santillan	4	7^{8}	1
(France) K de Schepper	7^{7}	6
8	(Germany) T Kamke	6^{5}	3
3	(France) P-H Mathieu	4	6	6^{6}
(France) T Lamasine	6	1	7^{8}
(Italy) L Giustino	2	6	7^{15}
(Belgium) Y Reuter	6	4	6^{13}
(Russia) A Rublev	6	4	7
Q	(Switzerland) A Bossel	4	6	5
Q	(France) C Hemery	6	6
6	(Georgia (country)) N Basilashvili	2	4

Second round
1/WC	(France) B Paire	7^{8}	6^{1}	6
(Spain) E López-Pérez	6^{6}	7^{7}	1
(France) É Roger-Vasselin	7^{7}	6
(France) K de Schepper	6^{4}	3
(France) T Lamasine	6	6
(Italy) L Giustino	4	4
(Russia) A Rublev	7	6
Q	(France) C Hemery	5	4

Quarterfinals
1/WC	(France) B Paire	4	6	6
(France) É Roger-Vasselin	6	3	2
(France) T Lamasine	4	4
(Russia) A Rublev	6	6

Semifinals
1/WC	(France) B Paire	3	6^{13}
(Russia) A Rublev	6	7^{15}

=== Bottom half ===
First round
5	(Moldova) R Albot	6	6
Q	(France) A Hoang	3	3
SE	(Australia) A De Minaur	6	6
WC	(France) C Moutet	1	3
(Germany) P Gojowczyk	6	7
(France) A Sidorenko	4	5
(France) Q Halys	4	5
4	(Russia) K Kravchuk	6	7
7	(Switzerland) M Chiudinelli	3	6	6
WC	(France) G Blancaneaux	6	1	4
(Russia) A Vatutin	7^{7}	6
(Spain) P Riba	6^{3}	3
(Croatia) F Škugor	6	6
Q	(France) R Boutillier	4	4
(France) J Benneteau	6	6^{4}	7^{7}
2/WC	(Russia) M Youzhny	4	7^{7}	6^{4}

Second round
5	(Moldova) R Albot	3	7^{12}	4
SE	(Australia) A De Minaur	6	6^{10}	6
(Germany) P Gojowczyk	6	6
4	(Russia) K Kravchuk	4	3
7	(Switzerland) M Chiudinelli	4	3
(Russia) A Vatutin	6	6
(Croatia) F Škugor	6	3	5
(France) J Benneteau	4	6	7

Quarterfinals
SE	(Australia) A De Minaur	1	3
(Germany) P Gojowczyk	6	6
(Russia) A Vatutin	2	4
(France) J Benneteau	6	6

Semifinals
(Germany) P Gojowczyk	6^{5}	6^{6}
(France) J Benneteau	7^{7}	7^{8}
