= 2025 Open de Vendée – Doubles =

Doubles
- 2025 Open de Vendée

Final
- Champions: (France) Grégoire Jacq (France) Albano Olivetti
- Runners-up: (United Kingdom) Hamish Stewart (United Kingdom) Harry Wendelken
- Score: 7–6^{(7–5)}, 6–3

Events
Singles	Doubles
- Open de Vendée

Marcelo Demoliner and Christian Harrison were the defending champions but chose not to defend their title.

Grégoire Jacq and Albano Olivetti won the title after defeating Hamish Stewart and Harry Wendelken 7–6^{(7–5)}, 6–3 in the final.

== Seeds ==
1. (United States) Vasil Kirkov / (Netherlands) Bart Stevens (first round)
2. (France) Grégoire Jacq / (France) Albano Olivetti (champions)
3. (Netherlands) Mats Hermans / (Netherlands) Mick Veldheer (semifinals, withdrew)
4. (Poland) Szymon Kielan / (Poland) Szymon Walków (first round)

== Draw ==
Key

- Q = Qualifier
- WC = Wild card
- LL = Lucky loser
- Alt = Alternate
- ITF = ITF entry
- PR = Protected ranking
- SR = Special ranking
- SE = Special exempt
- JE = Junior exempt
- JR = Junior Accelerator Programme entrant
- CO = College Accelerator Programme entrant
- NG = Next Gen Accelerator Program entrant
- w/o = Walkover
- r = Retired
- d = Defaulted

=== Draw ===
First round
1	(United States) V Kirkov (Netherlands) B Stevens	2	6^{4}
(Serbia) I Sabanov (Serbia) M Sabanov	6	7^{7}
(Bulgaria) A Genov (Sweden) E Grevelius	6^{3}	5
(United Kingdom) H Stewart (United Kingdom) H Wendelken	7^{7}	7
3	(Netherlands) M Hermans (Netherlands) M Veldheer	7^{7}	6
(United Kingdom) B Jones (Germany) T Rühl	6^{5}	2
(France) G Blancaneaux (Czech Republic) J Jermář	3	4
(Greece) S Sakellaridis (India) K Singh	6	6
WC	(France) A Bouquier (France) Loann Massard	3	4
WC	(France) L Poullain (France) Martin Sabas	6	6
PR	(Finland) Patrick Kaukovalta (Finland) E Ruusuvuori	6	6
4	(Poland) S Kielan (Poland) S Walków	4	4
(Germany) A Mies (Luxembourg) C Rodesch	1	4
(France) A Reymond (France) L Sanchez	6	6
(Italy) F Cinà (Italy) F Passaro	5	6	[5]
2	(France) G Jacq (France) A Olivetti	7	4	[10]

Quarterfinals
(Serbia) I Sabanov (Serbia) M Sabanov	3	2
(United Kingdom) H Stewart (United Kingdom) H Wendelken	6	6
3	(Netherlands) M Hermans (Netherlands) M Veldheer	6	6
(Greece) S Sakellaridis (India) K Singh	1	3
WC	(France) L Poullain (France) M Sabas	7^{7}	2	[4]
PR	(Finland) P Kaukovalta (Finland) E Ruusuvuori	6^{4}	6	[10]
(France) A Reymond (France) L Sanchez	6	3	[8]
2	(France) G Jacq (France) A Olivetti	4	6	[10]

Semifinals
(United Kingdom) H Stewart (United Kingdom) H Wendelken	w/o
3	(Netherlands) M Hermans (Netherlands) M Veldheer
PR	(Finland) P Kaukovalta (Finland) E Ruusuvuori	3	2
2	(France) G Jacq (France) A Olivetti	6	6

Final
(United Kingdom) H Stewart (United Kingdom) H Wendelken	6^{5}	3
2	(France) G Jacq (France) A Olivetti	7^{7}	6
