= 2025 Open de Vendée – Singles =

Tennis event results

Singles
- 2025 Open de Vendée

Final
- Champion: (Norway) Nicolai Budkov Kjær
- Runner-up: (United States) Patrick Kypson
- Score: 6–0, 6–3

Events
Singles	Doubles
- Open de Vendée

Lucas Pouille was the defending champion but was unable to defend his title due to a serious Achilles injury he suffered in February which required surgery.

Nicolai Budkov Kjær won the title after defeating Patrick Kypson 6–0, 6–3 in the final.

== Seeds ==
1. (Belgium) Raphaël Collignon (semifinals)
2. (France) Hugo Gaston (first round)
3. (Belgium) Alexander Blockx (second round)
4. (Italy) Francesco Passaro (quarterfinals)
5. (France) Pierre-Hugues Herbert (second round)
6. (Estonia) Mark Lajal (withdrew)
7. (Norway) Nicolai Budkov Kjær (champion)
8. (Canada) Alexis Galarneau (first round)

== Draw ==
Key

- Q = Qualifier
- WC = Wild card
- LL = Lucky loser
- Alt = Alternate
- ITF = ITF entry
- PR = Protected ranking
- SR = Special ranking
- SE = Special exempt
- JE = Junior exempt
- JR = Junior Accelerator Programme entrant
- CO = College Accelerator Programme entrant
- NG = Next Gen Accelerator Program entrant
- w/o = Walkover
- r = Retired
- d = Defaulted

=== Finals ===
Semifinals
1	(Belgium) Raphaël Collignon	1	7^{7}	5
(United States) Patrick Kypson	6	6^{2}	7
7	(Norway) Nicolai Budkov Kjær	6	4	6
(France) Clément Chidekh	1	6	2

Final
(United States) Patrick Kypson	0	3
7	(Norway) Nicolai Budkov Kjær	6	6

=== Top half ===
First round
1	(Belgium) R Collignon	7^{7}	6
Q	(Netherlands) J Sels	6^{4}	1
Q	(France) L Poullain	4	3
Q	(United Kingdom) S Parker	6	6
Q	(United Kingdom) H Stewart	4	2
(United Kingdom) A Fery	6	6
WC	(France) G Blancaneaux	3	6	6
Q	(Switzerland) R Bertola	6	3	2
3	(Belgium) A Blockx	6	6
(France) A Bouquier	4	4
(Switzerland) D Stricker	6	3	4
PR	(Finland) E Ruusuvuori	2	6	6
(France) C Hemery	4	3
(United States) P Kypson	6	6
NG	(United Kingdom) H Searle	4	1
5	(France) P-H Herbert	6	6

Second round
1	(Belgium) R Collignon	6	6
Q	(United Kingdom) S Parker	3	4
(United Kingdom) A Fery	6	3
WC	(France) G Blancaneaux	2	1^{r}
3	(Belgium) A Blockx	7	6^{8}	2
PR	(Finland) E Ruusuvuori	5	7^{10}	6
(United States) P Kypson	6	6
5	(France) P-H Herbert	2	3

Quarterfinals
1	(Belgium) R Collignon	5	6	7^{7}
(United Kingdom) A Fery	7	2	6^{4}
PR	(Finland) E Ruusuvuori	6	4	3
(United States) P Kypson	2	6	6

Semifinals
1	(Belgium) R Collignon	1	7^{7}	5
(United States) P Kypson	6	6^{2}	7

=== Bottom half ===
First round
7	(Norway) N Budkov Kjær	6	6
Q	Nikolay Vylegzhanin	1	3
WC	(France) Mickael Kaouk	3	5
WC	(France) Loann Massard	6	7
(Italy) F Cinà	6^{6}	4
LL	(Latvia) R Strombachs	7^{8}	6
(Luxembourg) C Rodesch	3	6^{6}
4	(Italy) F Passaro	6	7^{8}
8	(Canada) A Galarneau	3	6	3
JR	(Netherlands) M Röttgering	6	4	6
(France) S Gueymard Wayenburg	5	0
(Kazakhstan) M Kukushkin	7	6
(Germany) P Zahraj	5	4
Alt	(France) M Martineau	7	6
(France) C Chidekh	7	3	6
2	(France) H Gaston	5	6	4

Second round
7	(Norway) N Budkov Kjær	6	6
WC	(France) L Massard	3	2
LL	(Latvia) R Strombachs	7	3	6^{0}
4	(Italy) F Passaro	5	6	7^{7}
JR	(Netherlands) M Röttgering	2	7^{7}	2
(Kazakhstan) M Kukushkin	6	6^{4}	6
Alt	(France) M Martineau	6^{5}	3
(France) C Chidekh	7^{7}	6

Quarterfinals
7	(Norway) N Budkov Kjær	6	6
4	(Italy) F Passaro	4	4
(Kazakhstan) M Kukushkin	7^{7}	3	2
(France) C Chidekh	6^{4}	6	6

Semifinals
7	(Norway) N Budkov Kjær	6	4	6
(France) C Chidekh	1	6	2
