= 2013 Internationaux de Tennis de Vendée – Doubles =

Doubles
- 2013 Internationaux de Tennis de Vendée

Final
- Champions: (France) Fabrice Martin (France) Hugo Nys
- Runners-up: (Finland) Henri Kontinen (Spain) Adrián Menéndez-Maceiras
- Score: 3–6, 6–3, [10–8]

Events
Singles	Doubles
Internationaux de Tennis de Vendée	· 2014 →

Fabrice Martin and Hugo Nys won the title over Henri Kontinen and Adrián Menéndez-Maceiras 3–6, 6–3, [10–8].

== Seeds ==
1. (France) Pierre-Hugues Herbert / (France) Nicolas Mahut (first round)
2. (United States) James Cerretani / (Canada) Adil Shamasdin (semifinals)
3. (United Kingdom) Jamie Delgado / (Australia) Jordan Kerr (first round)
4. (France) Marc Gicquel / (France) Nicolas Renavand (quarterfinals)

== Draw ==
=== Key ===
- Q = Qualifier
- WC = Wild card
- LL = Lucky loser
- Alt = Alternate
- SE = Special exempt
- PR = Protected ranking
- ITF = ITF entry
- JE = Junior exempt
- w/o = Walkover
- r = Retired
- d = Defaulted
- SR = Special ranking

=== Draw ===
First round
1	(France) P-H Herbert (France) N Mahut	4	4
WC	(Canada) F Dancevic (France) V Millot	6	6
(Germany) T Puetz (Netherlands) T Schoorel	6	6
(Slovakia) N Gombos (Slovakia) A Martin	1	1
4	(France) M Gicquel (France) N Renavand	7	7^{7}
(France) D Guez (France) J Ouanna	5	6^{2}
(Republic of Ireland) J Cluskey (Philippines) R Gonzales	1	5
(Finland) H Kontinen (Spain) A Menéndez-Maceiras	6	7
(Germany) D Brown (Germany) B Phau	1	4
WC	(France) F Martin (France) H Nys	6	6
(Serbia) N Ćirić (Serbia) G Tošić	6^{5}	6	[10]
3	(United Kingdom) J Delgado (Australia) J Kerr	7^{7}	3	[7]
(Italy) F Cipolla (Uzbekistan) F Dustov	3	2
(Uruguay) A Behar (United States) V Mirzadeh	6	6
WC	(France) Alexandre Penaud (France) G Sakharov	3	4
2	(United States) J Cerretani (Canada) A Shamasdin	6	6

Quarterfinals
WC	(Canada) F Dancevic (France) V Millot	1	6^{2}
(Germany) T Puetz (Netherlands) T Schoorel	6	7^{7}
4	(France) M Gicquel (France) N Renavand	1	6^{5}
(Finland) H Kontinen (Spain) A Menéndez-Maceiras	6	7^{7}
WC	(France) F Martin (France) H Nys	6	7
(Serbia) N Ćirić (Serbia) G Tošić	4	5
(Uruguay) A Behar (United States) V Mirzadeh	4	7	[2]
2	(United States) J Cerretani (Canada) A Shamasdin	6	5	[10]

Semifinals
(Germany) T Puetz (Netherlands) T Schoorel	6^{5}	5
(Finland) H Kontinen (Spain) A Menéndez-Maceiras	7^{7}	7
WC	(France) F Martin (France) H Nys	7^{9}	7^{9}
2	(United States) J Cerretani (Canada) A Shamasdin	6^{7}	6^{7}

Final
(Finland) H Kontinen (Spain) A Menéndez-Maceiras	6	3	[8]
WC	(France) F Martin (France) H Nys	3	6	[10]
