= 2019 Internationaux de Tennis de Vendée =

- Date: 7–13 October
- Edition: 7th
- Surface: Hard
- Location: Mouilleron-le-Captif, France

Champions

Singles
- (Sweden) Mikael Ymer

Doubles
- (United Kingdom) Jonny O'Mara / (United Kingdom) Ken Skupski
← 2018 ·	Internationaux de Tennis de Vendée	· 2021 →

The 2019 Internationaux de Tennis de Vendée was a professional tennis tournament played on hard courts. It was the seventh edition of the tournament which was part of the 2019 ATP Challenger Tour. It took place in Mouilleron-le-Captif, France between 7 and 13 October 2019.

== Singles main-draw entrants ==
=== Seeds ===
Country	Player	Rank^{1}	Seed
FRA	Ugo Humbert	63	1
FRA	Grégoire Barrère	82	2
SWE	Mikael Ymer	83	3
POL	Kamil Majchrzak	86	4
ITA	Stefano Travaglia	87	5
ROU	Marius Copil	90	6
FRA	Corentin Moutet	101	7
SUI	Henri Laaksonen	108	8
FRA	Antoine Hoang	112	9
ITA	Paolo Lorenzi	114	10
SVK	Norbert Gombos	117	11
ITA	Gianluca Mager	118	12
AUT	Dennis Novak	121	13
ITA	Jannik Sinner	124	14
CZE	Jiří Veselý	125	15
LAT	Ernests Gulbis	129	16

- ^{1} Rankings are as of 30 September 2019.

=== Other entrants ===
The following players received wildcards into the singles main draw:

- (France) Geoffrey Blancaneaux
- (France) Hugo Grenier
- (France) Tom Jomby
- (Poland) Kamil Majchrzak
- (France) Rayane Roumane

The following player received entry into the singles main draw as an alternate:

- (Italy) Luca Vanni

== Champions ==
=== Singles ===
- (Sweden) Mikael Ymer def. (France) Mathias Bourgue 6–1, 6–4.

=== Doubles ===
- (United Kingdom) Jonny O'Mara / (United Kingdom) Ken Skupski def. (Netherlands) Sander Arends / (Netherlands) David Pel 6–1, 6–4.
