= 2023 Open de Vendée – Doubles =

Doubles
- 2023 Open de Vendée

Final
- Champions: (United Kingdom) Julian Cash (United States) Robert Galloway
- Runners-up: (United States) Maxime Cressy (Finland) Otto Virtanen
- Score: 6–4, 5–7, [12–10]

Events
Singles	Doubles
← 2022 ·	Open de Vendée	· 2024 →

Sander Arends and David Pel were the defending champions but only Arends chose to defend his title, partnering Sem Verbeek. Arends lost in the first round to Yuki Bhambri and Philipp Oswald.

Julian Cash and Robert Galloway won the title after defeating Maxime Cressy and Otto Virtanen 6–4, 5–7, [12–10] in the final.

== Seeds ==
1. (United Kingdom) Julian Cash / (United States) Robert Galloway (champions)
2. (India) Yuki Bhambri / (Austria) Philipp Oswald (quarterfinals)
3. (Germany) Constantin Frantzen / (Germany) Hendrik Jebens (first round)
4. (France) Dan Added / (France) Jonathan Eysseric (first round)

== Draw ==
=== Key ===
- Q = Qualifier
- WC = Wild card
- LL = Lucky loser
- Alt = Alternate
- ITF = ITF entry
- PR = Protected ranking
- SR = Special ranking
- SE = Special exempt
- JE = Junior exempt
- JR = Junior Accelerator Programme entrant
- CO = College Accelerator Programme entrant
- NG = Next Gen Accelerator Program entrant
- w/o = Walkover
- r = Retired
- d = Defaulted

First round
1	(United Kingdom) J Cash (United States) R Galloway	6	4	[10]
(United States) H Reese (Poland) S Walków	3	6	[8]
(Czech Republic) R Jebavý (Czech Republic) P Nouza	6	7^{7}
(India) P Raja (India) R Ramanathan	2	6^{5}
3	(Germany) C Frantzen (Germany) H Jebens	3	6	[7]
I Liutarevich (Ukraine) V Manafov	6	3	[10]
(Finland) P Niklas-Salminen (Greece) Pe Tsitsipas	6^{6}	3
(Ukraine) V Sachko (Germany) Niklas Schell	7^{8}	6
(United Kingdom) C Broom (United Kingdom) H Patten	6	6
(France) M Bourgue (France) A Escoffier	2	3
(United States) M Cressy (Finland) O Virtanen	6	4	[11]
4	(France) D Added (France) J Eysseric	2	6	[9]
WC	(France) G Debru (France) A Hoang	2	6	[6]
WC	(France) T Lamasine (France) M Martineau	6	2	[10]
(Netherlands) S Arends (Netherlands) S Verbeek	6	6^{1}	[8]
2	(India) Y Bhambri (Austria) P Oswald	4	7^{7}	[10]

Quarterfinals
1	(United Kingdom) J Cash (United States) R Galloway	6	7^{7}
(Czech Republic) R Jebavý (Czech Republic) P Nouza	3	6^{2}
I Liutarevich (Ukraine) V Manafov	7^{7}	5	[10]
(Ukraine) V Sachko (Germany) N Schell	6^{4}	7	[5]
(United Kingdom) C Broom (United Kingdom) H Patten	6	5	[4]
(United States) M Cressy (Finland) O Virtanen	4	7	[10]
WC	(France) T Lamasine (France) M Martineau	6	5	[11]
2	(India) Y Bhambri (Austria) P Oswald	3	7	[9]

Semifinals
1	(United Kingdom) J Cash (United States) R Galloway	7	6
I Liutarevich (Ukraine) V Manafov	5	3
(United States) M Cressy (Finland) O Virtanen	6^{5}	6	[10]
WC	(France) T Lamasine (France) M Martineau	7^{7}	3	[7]

Final
1	(United Kingdom) J Cash (United States) R Galloway	6	5	[12]
(United States) M Cressy (Finland) O Virtanen	4	7	[10]
