= 2015 Internationaux de Tennis de Vendée – Doubles =

Doubles
- 2015 Internationaux de Tennis de Vendée

Final
- Champions: (Netherlands) Sander Arends (Poland) Adam Majchrowicz
- Runners-up: (Belarus) Aliaksandr Bury (Sweden) Andreas Siljeström
- Score: 6–3, 5–7, [10–8]

Events
| Singles | Doubles |
- Internationaux de Tennis de Vendée

Sander Arends and Adam Majchrowicz won the title, defeating Aliaksandr Bury and Andreas Siljeström in the final 6–3, 5–7, [10–8] .

== Seeds ==
1. (Belarus) Aliaksandr Bury / (Sweden) Andreas Siljeström (final)
2. (Moldova) Radu Albot / (Russia) Teymuraz Gabashvili (first round, retired)
3. (Belgium) Ruben Bemelmans / (Germany) Philipp Petzschner (semifinals)
4. (United States) James Cerretani / (Germany) Frank Moser (quarterfinals)

== Draw ==
Key

- Q = Qualifier
- WC = Wild card
- LL = Lucky loser
- Alt = Alternate
- ITF = ITF entry
- PR = Protected ranking
- SR = Special ranking
- SE = Special exempt
- JE = Junior exempt
- JR = Junior Accelerator Programme entrant
- CO = College Accelerator Programme entrant
- NG = Next Gen Accelerator Program entrant
- w/o = Walkover
- r = Retired
- d = Defaulted

=== Draw ===
First round
1 | (Belarus) A Bury (Sweden) A Siljeström | 6 | 6
(Belgium) M Authom (France) V Millot | 4 | 4
(France) M Hamou (France) C Hemery | 4 | 6^{2}
(France) D Guez (France) A Sidorenko | 6 | 7^{7}
3 | (Belgium) R Bemelmans (Germany) P Petzschner | 7^{13} | 6
WC | (Czech Republic) L Dlouhý (Ukraine) S Stakhovsky | 6^{11} | 4
(France) M Janvier (France) M Teixeira | 4 | 2
(France) G Barrère (France) L Pouille | 6 | 6
(Netherlands) S Arends (Poland) A Majchrowicz | 6 | 6^{4} | [10]
(France) Sebastien Boltz (France) G Sakharov | 2 | 7^{7} | [8]
WC | (France) Mick Lescure (France) Maxime Tabatruong | 4 | 2
4 | (United States) J Cerretani (Germany) F Moser | 6 | 6
(France) J Eysseric (France) Tom Jomby | 5 | 6 | [10]
(Switzerland) M Chiudinelli (Czech Republic) J Mertl | 7 | 2 | [8]
WC | (France) L Poullain (France) Vincent Stouff | 3
2 | (Moldova) R Albot (Russia) T Gabashvili | 3^{r}

Quarterfinals
1 | (Belarus) A Bury (Sweden) A Siljeström | 6 | 6
(France) D Guez (France) A Sidorenko | 3 | 0
3 | (Belgium) R Bemelmans (Germany) P Petzschner | w/o
(France) G Barrère (France) L Pouille
(Netherlands) S Arends (Poland) A Majchrowicz | 7 | 6
4 | (United States) J Cerretani (Germany) F Moser | 5 | 3
(France) J Eysseric (France) T Jomby | 3 | 4
WC | (France) L Poullain (France) V Stouff | 6 | 6

Semifinals
1 | (Belarus) A Bury (Sweden) A Siljeström | 7^{7} | 6
3 | (Belgium) R Bemelmans (Germany) P Petzschner | 6^{1} | 4
(Netherlands) S Arends (Poland) A Majchrowicz | 6 | 3 | [10]
WC | (France) L Poullain (France) V Stouff | 4 | 6 | [6]

Final
1 | (Belarus) A Bury (Sweden) A Siljeström | 3 | 7 | [8]
(Netherlands) S Arends (Poland) A Majchrowicz | 6 | 5 | [10]
