= Nicolai Budkov Kjær =

Norwegian tennis player (born 2006)

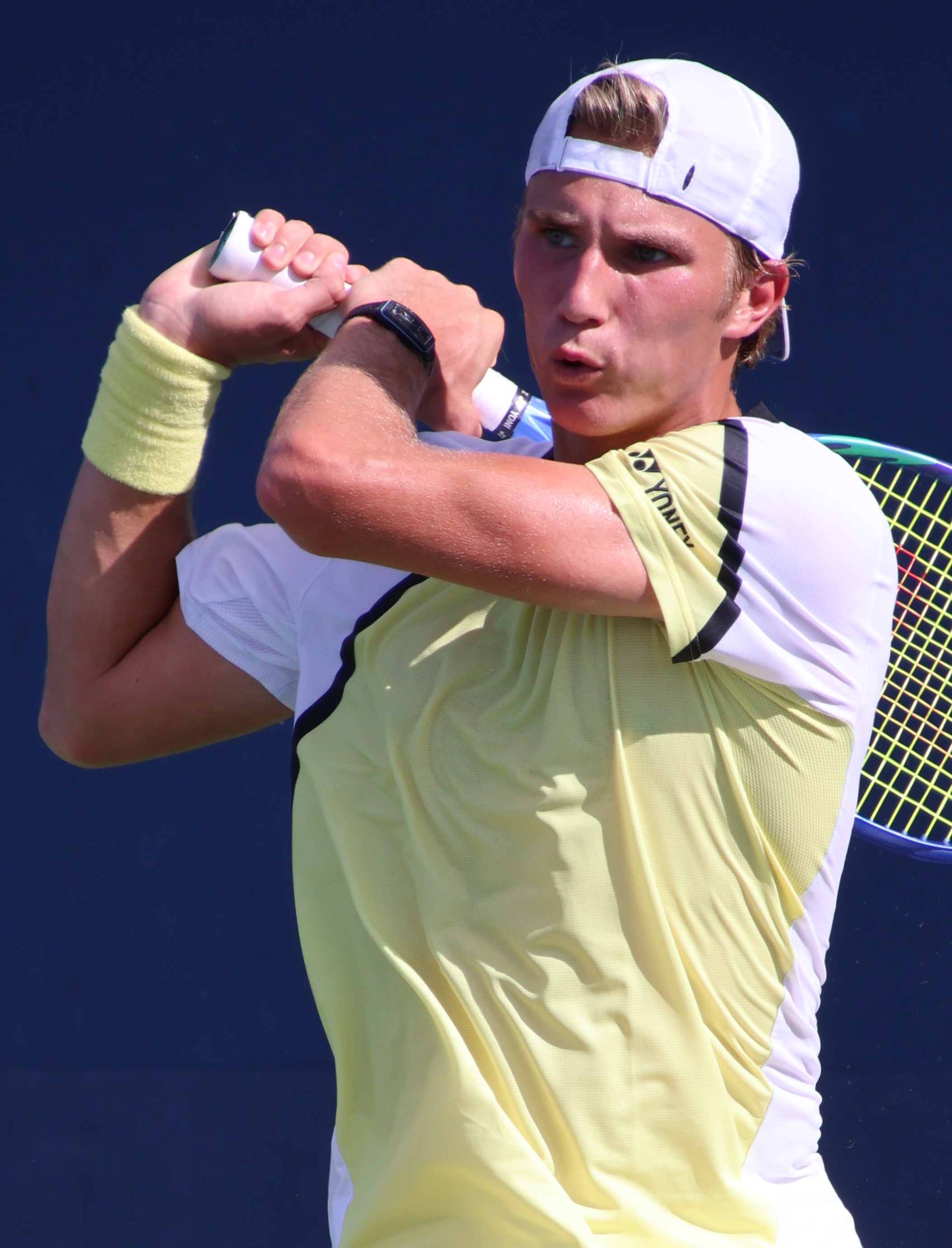
- Budkov Kjaer at the 2026 US Open
- ITF name: Nicolai Budkov Kjaer
- Country (sports): Norway
- Born: 1 September 2006 (age 20) Oslo, Norway
- Height: 1.91 m (6 ft 3 in)
- Plays: Right handed (two-handed backhand)
- Coach: Alexander Kjaer
- Prize money: US $746,543

Singles
- Career record: 9–15 (at ATP Tour level, Grand Slam level, and in Davis Cup)
- Career titles: 4 Challenger
- Highest ranking: No. 118 (13 July 2026)
- Current ranking: No. 178 (7 November 2026)

Grand Slam singles results
- Australian Open: 1R (2026)
- French Open: Q2 (2026)
- Wimbledon: Q3 (2026)
- US Open: Q2 (2026)

Doubles
- Career record: 0–1 (at ATP Tour level, Grand Slam level, and in Davis Cup)
- Career titles: 0
- Highest ranking: No. 1,082 (3 March 2025)

Team competitions
- Davis Cup: 4–4
- Last updated on: 6 November 2026.

Nicolai Budkov Kjær (born 1 September 2006) is a Norwegian professional tennis player. He has a career-high ATP singles ranking of No. 118 achieved on 13 July 2026. He is currently the No. 2 singles player from Norway. Budkov Kjær won four singles titles on ATP Challenger Tour. He represents Norway at the Davis Cup.

== Early life ==
Budkov Kjær was born to a Norwegian father and an Estonian mother. He has a sister who also plays tennis, Alexandra Budkova Kjær. He lives in Bygdøy, Oslo, and trains at Oslo Tennisarena and Wang Toppidrett.

== Professional career ==
=== Juniors ===
Budkov Kjær won two Grand Slam Junior titles, at the 2024 French Open with Joel Schwärzler, and in singles at the Wimbledon in the same season, becoming the first Norwegian man to win major titles at either the junior or professional level. He reached an ITF junior combined ranking of world No. 1 on 15 July 2024.

=== 2023-2024: Davis Cup debut ===
In September 2023, Budkov Kjær made his Davis Cup debut against Peru.

In February 2024, he replaced Dominic Thiem at the Ultimate Tennis Showdown in Oslo, the ninth edition of the tournament. The following month, he won his first professional title at the $15k Antalya Series. He subsequently made his debut in the top 1000 of the ATP rankings at world No. 897 on 8 April 2024. He was the first Norwegian to do so since Casper Ruud in 2016. Also in February, he recorded his first Davis Cup win, over Latvian Davis Rolis, and in September his second, with a win over Portuguese Jaime Faria, who was ranked No. 157 at the time. In November, Budkov Kjær defeated former Top 10 player Pablo Carreño Busta at the 2024 Montemar Challenger.

=== 2025: Four Challenger titles, ATP first win, NextGen Finals ===
In February, Budkov Kjær won his first ATP Challenger title defeating fellow countryman Viktor Durasovic in the 2025 Glasgow Challenger. The match up was only the second time ever two Norwegians had met in a Challenger final, after Christian Ruud and Jan Frode Andersen who met in Fürth in 1998. As a result he reached a new career high ranking of No. 297 on 24 February 2025.

In April, ranked at a career-high of No. 287, Budkov Kjær received a wildcard for the qualifying competition at the 2025 Monte-Carlo Masters.

In June, Budkov Kjær played his first qualifying match in a Grand Slam event and reached the second qualifying round at 2025 Wimbledon Championships. In July, Budkov Kjær made his ATP debut after qualifying for his first main draw at the 2025 Swedish Open. In the first round he defeated Thiago Monteiro to grab his maiden win on the ATP Tour. Budkov Kjær earned his second Challenger title at the Tampere Open, defeating Sascha Gueymard Wayenburg in the final. As a result, he entered the top 200 at world No. 187 on 28 July 2025, rising close to 70 positions up in the singles rankings. The following week he won the Astana Challenger after beating Alexandr Binda, putting him sixth in the NextGen ATP race. As a result he reached a new career-high singles ranking of world No. 163 on 4 August 2025.

Ranked at a career-high of No. 149, achieved on 29 September 2025, Budkov Kjær won his fourth Challenger title at the Open de Vendée, defeating Patrick Kypson in the final in 54 minutes, the shortest final in the event’s history. At 19 years old, he also become the youngest champion in the history of the tournament. As a result he reached a new career-high of world No. 136 on 13 October 2025.

=== 2026: Major, top 125, Masters debut and third round ===
In January, Budkov Kjær made his Australian Open debut as a qualifier, but lost to Reilly Opelka.

In April, he qualified for the Madrid Open main draw, with wins over Francesco Maestrelli and Moez Echargui in the qualifying. He advanced to the next round after Reilly Opelka retired due to an injury. He then defeated 31st seed Denis Shapovalov to reach his first Masters third round.

== Performance timeline ==
Key
W	F	SF	QF	#R	RR	Q#	DNQ	A	NH

(W) winner; (F) finalist; (SF) semifinalist; (QF) quarterfinalist; (#R) rounds 4, 3, 2, 1; (RR) round-robin stage; (Q#) qualification round; (DNQ) did not qualify; (A) absent; (NH) not held; (SR) strike rate (events won / competed); (W–L) win–loss record.

=== Singles ===
Current through the 2026 Italian Open – Men's singles.

Tournament	2025	2026	SR	W–L	Win%
Grand Slam tournaments
Australian Open	A	1R	0 / 1	0–1	0%
French Open	A	Q2	0 / 0	0–0	–
Wimbledon	Q2	Q3	0 / 0	0–0	–
US Open	A	Q2	0 / 0	0–0	–
Win–loss	0–0	0–1	0 / 1	0–1	0%
ATP Masters 1000
Indian Wells	A	A	0 / 0	0–0	–
Miami Open	A	A	0 / 0	0–0	–
Monte-Carlo Masters	Q1	Q1	0 / 0	0–0	–
Madrid Open	A	3R	0 / 1	2–1	67%
Italian Open	A	Q2	0 / 0	0–0	–
Canada Open	A		0 / 0	0–0	–
Cincinnati Open	A		0 / 0	0–0	–
Win–loss	0–0	2–1	0 / 1	2–1	67%

== ATP Challenger Tour finals ==
=== Singles: 5 (4 titles, 1 runner-up) ===
Legend ATP Challenger Tour (4–1)	Finals by surface Hard (3–1) Clay (1–0)

Result	W–L	Date	Tournament	Tier	Surface	Opponent	Score
Win	1–0	Feb 2025	Glasgow Challenger, UK	Challenger	Hard (i)	(Norway) Viktor Durasovic	6–4, 6–3
Win	2–0	Jul 2025	Tampere Open, Finland	Challenger	Clay	(France) Sascha Gueymard Wayenburg	7–6^{(7–5)}, 6–7^{(2–7)}, 6–2
Win	3–0	Jul 2025	President's Cup, Kazakhstan	Challenger	Hard	(Italy) Alexandr Binda	6–4, 6–3
Win	4–0	Sep 2025	Open de Vendée, France	Challenger	Hard (i)	(United States) Patrick Kypson	6–0, 6–3
Loss	4–1	Mar 2026	Thionville Open, France	Challenger	Hard (i)	(Austria) Sebastian Ofner	7–6^{(7–5)}, 3–6, 6–7^{(7–9)}

== ITF World Tennis Tour finals ==
=== Singles: 4 (2 titles, 2 runner-ups) ===
Legend ITF WTT (2–2)	Finals by surface Hard (0–1) Clay (2–1)

Result	W–L	Date	Tournament	Tier	Surface	Opponent	Score
Win	1–0	Mar 2024	M15 Antalya, Turkey	WTT	Clay	(Netherlands) Niels Visker	6–4, 6–3
Win	2–0	May 2024	M15 Antalya, Turkey	WTT	Clay	(Bulgaria) Yanaki Milev	6–1, 6–0
Loss	2–1	Dec 2024	M25 Antalya, Turkey	WTT	Clay	(Switzerland) Mika Brunold	2–6, 6–7^{(7–9)}
Loss	2–2	Jan 2025	M25 Esch-sur-Alzette, Luxembourg	WTT	Hard (i)	(Sweden) Mikael Ymer	1–6, 7–5, 2–6

== National and international representation ==
=== Davis Cup: 8 (4 victories, 4 defeats) ===
Group membership World Group (0–0) WG play-off (0–0) Group I (4–4) Group II (0–0) Group III (0–0) Group IV (0–0)	Matches by surface Hard (4–2) Clay (0–2) Grass (0–0) Carpet (0–0)	Matches by type Singles (4–4) Doubles (0–0)

- ▲ ▼ indicates the outcome of the Davis Cup match followed by the score, date, place of event, the zonal classification and its phase, and the court surface.

Rubber outcome	No.	Rubber	Match type (partner if any)	Opponent nation	Opponent player(s)	Score
▼1–4; 16–17 September 2023; Lawn Tennis de la Exposición, Lima, Peru; World Group I play-offs; clay surface
Loss	1	II	Singles	Peru	Juan Pablo Varillas	5–7, 4–6
Loss	2	V	Singles	Peru	Ignacio Buse	2–6, 6–4, [9–11]
▲4–0; 2–3 February 2024; Gjøvik Olympic Cavern Hall, Gjøvik, Norway; Davis Cup qualifying round; hard(i) surface
Win	3	IV	Singles	Latvia	Davis Rolis	6–3, 6–4
▲3–1; 13–14 September 2024; Nadderud Arena, Bekkestua, Norway; Davis Cup qualifying round; hard(i) surface
Win	4	I	Singles	Portugal	Jaime Faria	4–6, 6–3, 7–6^{(7–4)}
▼2–3; 30–31 January 2025; Fjellhamar Arena, Oslo, Norway; Davis Cup qualifying round; hard(i) surface
Loss	5	I	Singles	Argentina	Tomás Martín Etcheverry	5–7, 6–2, 6–7^{(5–7)}
Loss	6	V	Singles	Argentina	Mariano Navone	6–4, 3–6, 4–6
▲3–2; 13–14 September 2025; Taipei Tennis Center, Taipei, Chinese Taipei; World Group I; hard(i) surface
Win	7	I	Singles	Chinese Taipei	Wu Tung-lin	4–6, 6–3, 6–4
Win	8	IV	Singles	Chinese Taipei	Tseng Chun-hsin	7–6^{(7–2)}, 6–4

== Exhibition matches ==
=== Singles ===
Result	Date	Tournament	Surface	Opponent	Score
Loss	Feb 2024	Ultimate Tennis Showdown, Oslo, Norway	Hard (i)	(Norway) Casper Ruud	9–16, 13–14, 13–14 (Round Robin)
Win	Jan 2026	Red Bull Bass Line, Australian Open Fan Week, Melbourne, Australia	Hard	(Australia) Jordan Thompson	5–0, 3–5, 5–3, 5–4

== Junior Grand Slam finals ==
=== Singles: 2 (1 title, 1 runner-up) ===
Result	Year	Tournament	Surface	Opponent	Score
Win	2024	Wimbledon	Grass	(Netherlands) Mees Röttgering	6–3, 6–3
Loss	2024	US Open	Hard	(Spain) Rafael Jódar	6–2, 2–6, 6–7^{(1–10)}

=== Doubles: 1 (title) ===
Result	Year	Tournament	Surface	Partner	Opponents	Score
Win	2024	French Open	Clay	(Austria) Joel Schwärzler	(Italy) Federico Cinà (Japan) Rei Sakamoto	6–4, 7–6^{(7–3)}

== Awards ==
2024

- ITF Junior World Champion

Awards and achievements
Preceded by (Brazil) João Fonseca	ITF Junior World Champion; 2024	Succeeded by Incumbent
