= 2019 Internationaux de Tennis de Vendée – Doubles =

Doubles
- 2019 Internationaux de Tennis de Vendée

Final
- Champions: (United Kingdom) Jonny O'Mara (United Kingdom) Ken Skupski
- Runners-up: (Netherlands) Sander Arends (Netherlands) David Pel
- Score: 6–1, 6–4

Events
Singles	Doubles
- Internationaux de Tennis de Vendée

Sander Gillé and Joran Vliegen were the defending champions but lost in the first round to Sander Arends and David Pel.

Jonny O'Mara and Ken Skupski won the title after defeating Arends and Pel 6–1, 6–4 in the final.

== Seeds ==
1. (Belgium) Sander Gillé / (Belgium) Joran Vliegen (first round)
2. (United Kingdom) Luke Bambridge / (Japan) Ben McLachlan (first round)
3. (Denmark) Frederik Nielsen / (Pakistan) Aisam-ul-Haq Qureshi (first round)
4. (United Kingdom) Jonny O'Mara / (United Kingdom) Ken Skupski (champions)

== Draw ==
Key

- Q = Qualifier
- WC = Wild card
- LL = Lucky loser
- Alt = Alternate
- ITF = ITF entry
- PR = Protected ranking
- SR = Special ranking
- SE = Special exempt
- JE = Junior exempt
- JR = Junior Accelerator Programme entrant
- CO = College Accelerator Programme entrant
- NG = Next Gen Accelerator Program entrant
- w/o = Walkover
- r = Retired
- d = Defaulted

First round
1	(Belgium) S Gillé (Belgium) J Vliegen	6	2	[4]
(Netherlands) S Arends (Netherlands) D Pel	2	6	[10]
(Monaco) R Arneodo (Monaco) H Nys	6	7^{7}
(Brazil) M Demoliner (Netherlands) M Middelkoop	3	6^{2}
3	(Denmark) F Nielsen (Pakistan) A-u-H Qureshi	7^{7}	3	[9]
WC	(France) M Guinard (Austria) L Miedler	6^{2}	6	[11]
(United States) N Lammons (United States) N Monroe	7^{7}	7^{9}
(Chile) H Podlipnik Castillo (Austria) T-S Weissborn	6^{5}	6^{7}
(Italy) S Bolelli (Netherlands) R Haase	2	4
(India) P Raja (Croatia) A Šančić	6	6
WC	(France) Q Halys (France) T Lamasine	0	2
4	(United Kingdom) J O'Mara (United Kingdom) K Skupski	6	6
(India) R Ramanathan (Italy) S Travaglia	4	6	[14]
WC	(France) L Poullain (France) Vincent Stouff	6	3	[12]
(Czech Republic) R Jebavý (Slovakia) I Zelenay	6	3	[10]
2	(United Kingdom) L Bambridge (Japan) B McLachlan	3	6	[3]

Quarterfinals
(Netherlands) S Arends (Netherlands) D Pel	4	6	[10]
(Monaco) R Arneodo (Monaco) H Nys	6	3	[4]
WC	(France) M Guinard (Austria) L Miedler	6	4	[10]
(United States) N Lammons (United States) N Monroe	3	6	[7]
(India) P Raja (Croatia) A Šančić	3	4
4	(United Kingdom) J O'Mara (United Kingdom) K Skupski	6	6
(India) R Ramanathan (Italy) S Travaglia	0	7	[10]
(Czech Republic) R Jebavý (Slovakia) I Zelenay	6	5	[12]

Semifinals
(Netherlands) S Arends (Netherlands) D Pel	7	6
WC	(France) M Guinard (Austria) L Miedler	5	4
4	(United Kingdom) J O'Mara (United Kingdom) K Skupski	6	6
(Czech Republic) R Jebavý (Slovakia) I Zelenay	3	3

Final
(Netherlands) S Arends (Netherlands) D Pel	1	4
4	(United Kingdom) J O'Mara (United Kingdom) K Skupski	6	6
