= 2014 Internationaux de Tennis de Vendée – Singles =

Singles
- 2014 Internationaux de Tennis de Vendée

Final
- Champion: (France) Pierre-Hugues Herbert
- Runner-up: (Turkey) Marsel İlhan
- Score: 6-2, 6-3

Events
Singles	Doubles
- Internationaux de Tennis de Vendée

Fifth seed Pierre-Hugues Herbert won the title, beating Marsel İlhan in the final 6–2, 6–3.

== Seeds ==
1. (Croatia) Borna Ćorić (quarterfinals)
2. (Germany) Tobias Kamke (semifinals)
3. (Lithuania) Ričardas Berankis (quarterfinals)
4. (France) Kenny de Schepper (first round)
5. (France) Pierre-Hugues Herbert (champion)
6. (France) Nicolas Mahut (second round)
7. (Cyprus) Marcos Baghdatis (second round, retired)
8. (Turkey) Marsel İlhan (final)

== Draw ==
Key

- Q = Qualifier
- WC = Wild card
- LL = Lucky loser
- Alt = Alternate
- ITF = ITF entry
- PR = Protected ranking
- SR = Special ranking
- SE = Special exempt
- JE = Junior exempt
- JR = Junior Accelerator Programme entrant
- CO = College Accelerator Programme entrant
- NG = Next Gen Accelerator Program entrant
- w/o = Walkover
- r = Retired
- d = Defaulted

=== Finals ===
Semifinals
8	(Turkey) Marsel İlhan	6	6
(Romania) Victor Hănescu	4	4
5	(France) Pierre-Hugues Herbert	6^{9}	7^{7}	6
2	(Germany) Tobias Kamke	7^{11}	6^{5}	3

Final
8	(Turkey) Marsel İlhan	2	3
5	(France) Pierre-Hugues Herbert	6	6

=== Top half ===
First round
1	(Croatia) B Ćorić	6	6
Q	(France) A Sidorenko	4	4
(France) A Michon	6	7
(France) D Guez	4	5
(France) T Lamasine	6	3	7
(Belgium) N Desein	3	6	5
(Ukraine) D Molchanov	2	3
8	(Turkey) M İlhan	6	6
4	(France) K de Schepper	4	5
(Lithuania) L Grigelis	6	7
(France) V Millot	7	6
WC	(France) Q Halys	65	1
(Romania) V Hănescu	7	7
(France) F Serra	5	65
Q	(France) G Jacq	4	6	1
6	(France) N Mahut	6	4	6

Second round
1	(Croatia) B Ćorić	6	6
(France) A Michon	3	4
(France) T Lamasine	4	6	3
8	(Turkey) M İlhan	6	3	6
(Lithuania) L Grigelis	1	4
(France) V Millot	6	6
(Romania) V Hănescu	7^{7}	6
6	(France) N Mahut	6^{3}	4

Quarterfinals
1	(Croatia) B Ćorić	5	1
8	(Turkey) M İlhan	7	6
(France) V Millot	5	4
(Romania) V Hănescu	7	6

Semifinals
8	(Turkey) M İlhan	6	6
(Romania) V Hănescu	4	4

=== Bottom half ===
First round
5	(France) P-H Herbert	6	6
(Spain) I Cervantes Huegun	2	1
Q	(France) Laurent Rochette	0	1
WC	(France) C Hemery	6	6
(Belgium) R Bemelmans	6	6
(Croatia) A Veić	4	3
Q	(Russia) V Baluda	1	3
3	(Lithuania) R Berankis	6	6
7	(Cyprus) M Baghdatis	6	6
(Switzerland) Y Marti	2	1
(Spain) P Riba	4	2
(France) L Pouille	6	6
(Moldova) R Albot	6	6
WC	(France) J-S Tatlot	3	2
WC	(France) M Llodra	2	2
2	(Germany) T Kamke	6	6

Second round
5	(France) P-H Herbert	6	6^{2}	7
WC	(France) C Hemery	3	7^{7}	5
(Belgium) R Bemelmans	6	6^{2}	5
3	(Lithuania) R Berankis	4	7^{7}	7
7	(Cyprus) M Baghdatis	6	4^{r}
(France) L Pouille	4	4
(Moldova) R Albot	2	4
2	(Germany) T Kamke	6	6

Quarterfinals
5	(France) P-H Herbert	7^{7}	6
3	(Lithuania) R Berankis	6^{5}	2
(France) L Pouille	3	2
2	(Germany) T Kamke	6	6

Semifinals
5	(France) P-H Herbert	6^{9}	7^{7}	6
2	(Germany) T Kamke	7^{11}	6^{5}	3
