= 2014 Internationaux de Tennis de Vendée =

- Date: 3–9 November
- Edition: 2nd
- Surface: Hard
- Location: Mouilleron-le-Captif, France

Champions

Singles
- (France) Pierre-Hugues Herbert

Doubles
- (France) Pierre-Hugues Herbert / (France) Nicolas Mahut
- Internationaux de Tennis de Vendée

The 2014 Internationaux de Tennis de Vendée was a professional tennis tournament played on hard courts. It was the second edition of the tournament which was part of the 2014 ATP Challenger Tour. It took place in Mouilleron-le-Captif, France between 3 and 9 November 2014.

== Singles main-draw entrants ==
=== Seeds ===
Country	Player	Rank^{1}	Seed
CRO	Borna Ćorić	93	1
GER	Tobias Kamke	102	2
LTU	Ričardas Berankis	103	3
FRA	Kenny de Schepper	105	4
FRA	Pierre-Hugues Herbert	109	5
FRA	Nicolas Mahut	111	6
CYP	Marcos Baghdatis	116	7
TUR	Marsel İlhan	117	8

- ^{1} Rankings are as of October 27, 2014.

=== Other entrants ===
The following players received wildcards into the singles main draw:

- (France) Quentin Halys
- (France) Calvin Hemery
- (France) Michaël Llodra
- (France) Johan Sébastien Tatlot

The following player received a special exemption into the singles main draw:

- (France) Florent Serra

The following players received entry from the qualifying draw:

- (Russia) Victor Baluda
- (France) Grégoire Jacq
- (France) Laurent Rochette
- (France) Alexandre Sidorenko

== Champions ==
=== Singles ===
- (France) Pierre-Hugues Herbert def. (Turkey) Marsel İlhan 6–2, 6-3

=== Doubles ===
- (France) Pierre-Hugues Herbert / (France) Nicolas Mahut def. (Germany) Tobias Kamke / (Germany) Philipp Marx 6–3, 6-4
