= Adam Majchrowicz =

Polish tennis player

- Country (sports): Poland
- Born: 5 October 1991 (age 34) Bydgoszcz, Poland
- Height: 1.88 m (6 ft 2 in)
- Plays: Right-handed (two handed-backhand)
- Prize money: $27,700

Singles
- Career titles: 0
- Highest ranking: No. 1,117 (3 April 2017)

Doubles
- Career titles: 1 Challenger, 10 ITF
- Highest ranking: No. 184 (14 December 2015)

Adam Majchrowicz (born 5 October 1991) is a Polish tennis player. Majchrowicz has a career high ATP singles ranking of No. 1,117 achieved on 3 April 2017 and a career high ATP doubles ranking of No. 184 achieved on 14 December 2015. Majchrowicz has won 10 ITF doubles titles.

Majchrowicz won his first ATP Challenger title at the 2015 Internationaux de Tennis de Vendée, partnering Sander Arends.

== Tour titles ==
Legend
Grand Slam (0)
ATP Masters Series (0)
ATP Tour (0)
Challengers (1)

=== Doubles ===
Outcome	No.	Date	Tournament	Surface	Partner	Opponents	Score
Winner	1.	15 November 2015	Mouilleron-le-Captif, France	Hard (i)	(Netherlands) Sander Arends	(Belarus) Aliaksandr Bury (Sweden) Andreas Siljeström	6–3, 5–7, [10–8]
