= Elias Ymer =

Swedish tennis player (born 1996)

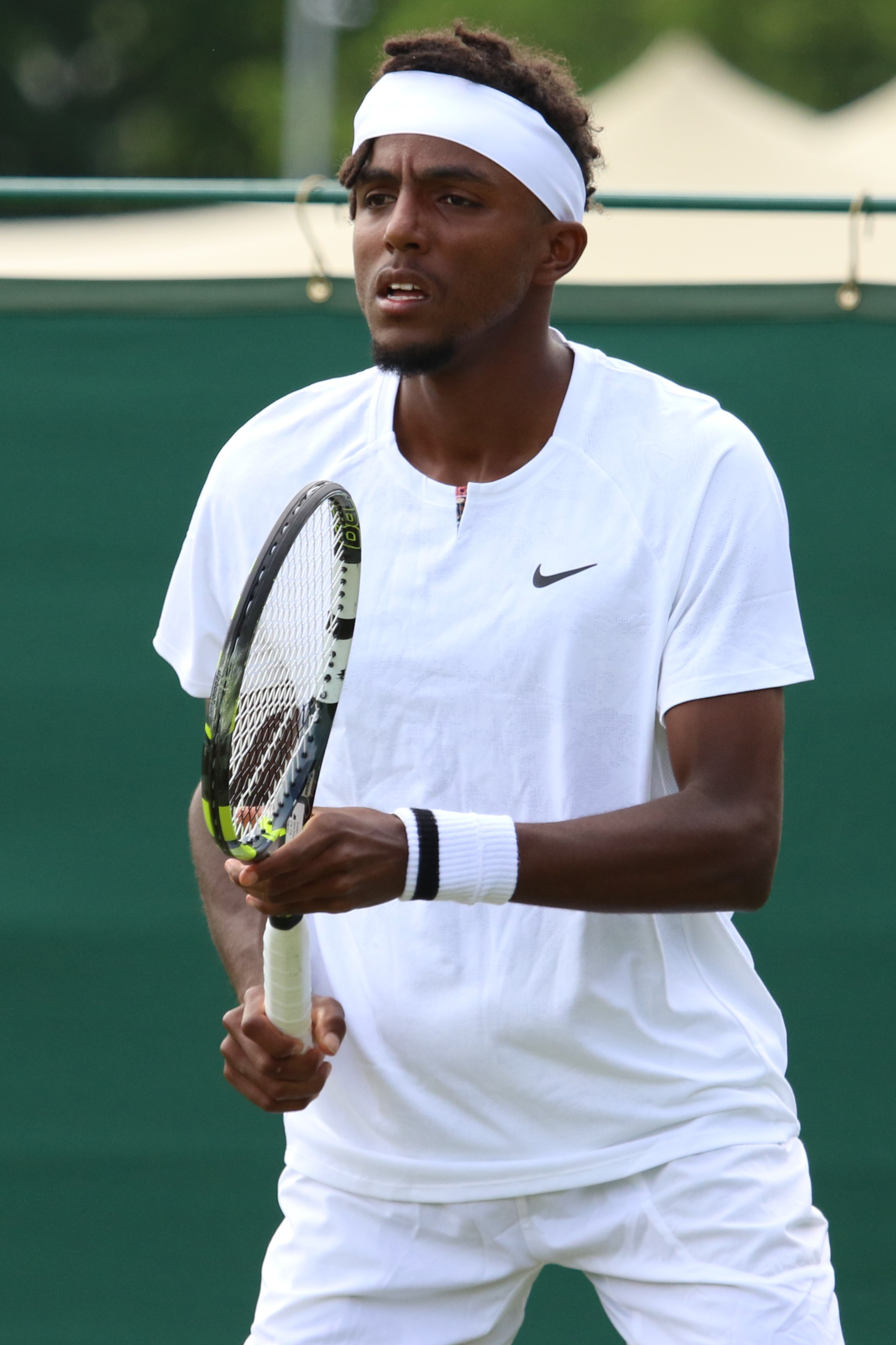
- Ymer at the 2023 Wimbledon Championships
- Full name: Elias Wondwosen Yemer
- Country (sports): Sweden
- Residence: Stockholm, Sweden
- Born: 10 April 1996 (age 30) Skara, Sweden
- Height: 1.85 m (6 ft 1 in)
- Turned pro: 2014
- Plays: Right-handed (two handed-backhand)
- Coach: Galo Blanco (2015); Robin Söderling (2017–2018); Christian Brydniak (2021–2022), Rafael Ymer, Frederico Goncalves, Christian Schumacher
- Prize money: US $2,464,750

Singles
- Career record: 47–86
- Career titles: 0
- Highest ranking: No. 105 (11 June 2018)
- Current ranking: No. 204 (31 August 2026)

Grand Slam singles results
- Australian Open: 1R (2015, 2018, 2021, 2026)
- French Open: 2R (2018)
- Wimbledon: 1R (2015, 2022, 2024)
- US Open: 1R (2015)

Doubles
- Career record: 11–18
- Career titles: 1
- Highest ranking: No. 188 (16 October 2017)
- Last updated on: 1 September 2026.

Elias Ymer (born 10 April 1996) is a Swedish tennis player. Ymer has a career-high ATP singles ranking of World No. 105, achieved on 11 June 2018. He has a career-high ATP doubles ranking of World No. 188, achieved on 16 October 2017. He is the current No. 1 Swedish singles player.

== Personal info ==
Ymer was born in Skara, Sweden to Ethiopian immigrant parents. He is the elder brother of tennis player Mikael Ymer.

From 2017 to 2018, Ymer was coached by Robin Söderling.

In the autumn of 2022 Ymer, together with ten other athletes, was accepted as a student at Harvard Business School's “Crossover into Business” program.

== Career ==
=== 2014: ATP debut ===
Ymer made his ATP main draw singles debut at the 2013 Swedish Open where he lost in the first round to Grigor Dimitrov. Ymer received a wildcard at the 2014 Swedish Open, defeating Mikhail Kukushkin in the first round before falling to João Sousa in the second round.

=== 2015: Qualification at all Grand Slams on debut in one year ===
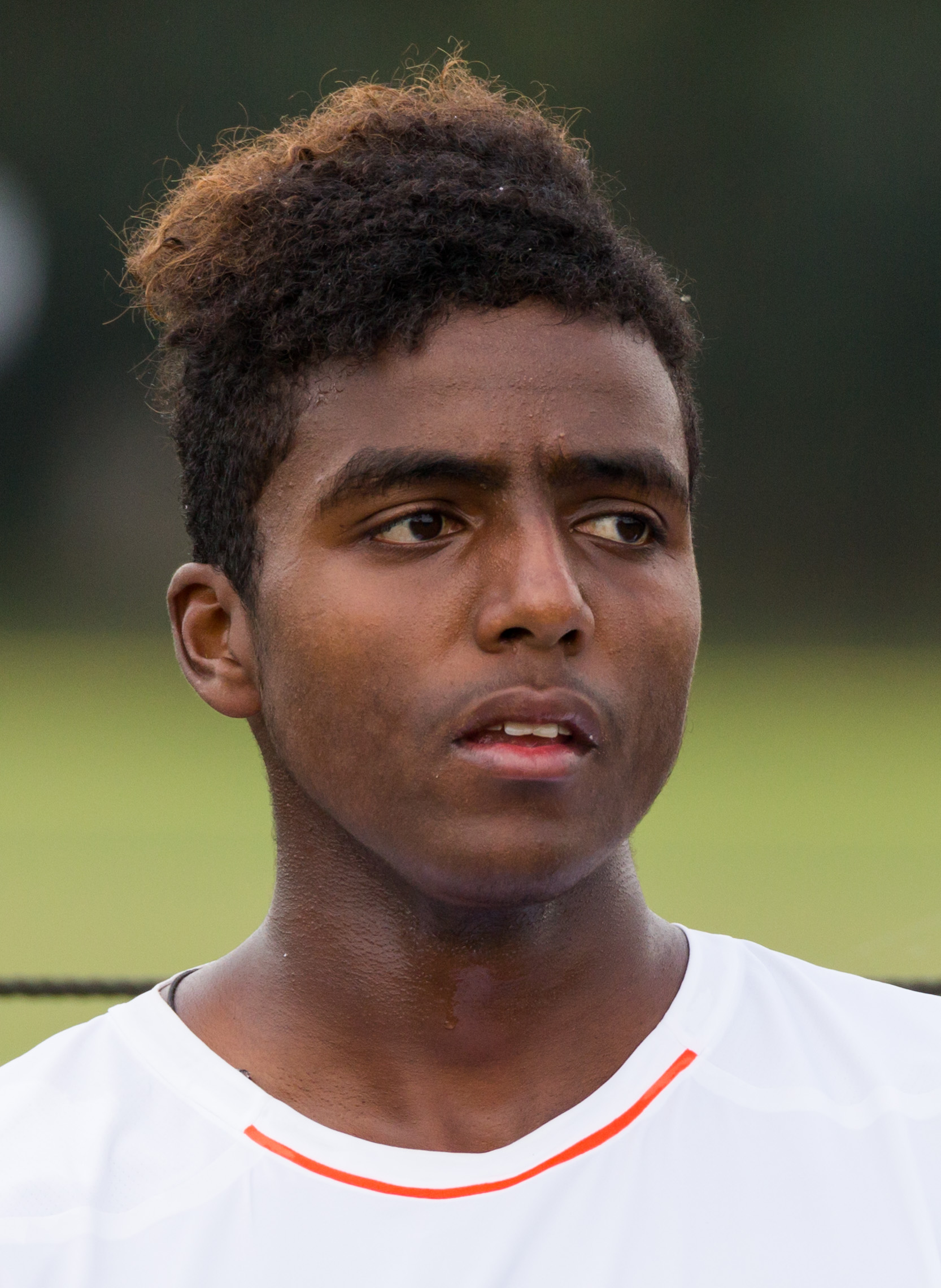
Ymer at the 2015 Wimbledon qualifying tournament

He qualified to the main of 2015 Australian Open after wins against Benoît Paire, Jan Mertl and Hyeon Chung. He lost in the first round against Go Soeda in five sets.

At the 2015 Barcelona Open Banc Sabadell, Ymer defeated Thiemo de Bakker and Nick Kyrgios to reach the third round, where he lost to David Ferrer.

He qualified to the main draw of 2015 French Open after wins against Roberto Marcora, Blaž Rola and Roberto Carballés Baena. He lost in the first round against Lukáš Rosol in straight sets.

Ymer won his first ATP Challenger title at the 2015 Città di Caltanissetta, beating American Bjorn Fratangelo in straight sets.

Ymer qualified to the main draw of 2015 Wimbledon Championships after wins against Thomas Fabbiano, Boy Westerhof and Guido Pella. He lost in the first round to 23rd seed Ivo Karlović in four sets.

Ymer qualified for all four Grand Slams in 2015 after coming through qualifying at the 2015 US Open. He lost in the first round to Diego Schwartzman. His finish made him the second man to progress to the main draw of all four majors through qualifying in one year, after Frank Dancevic in 2011.

=== 2016–2017: Masters debut in singles, Maiden ATP title in doubles ===
He won his maiden title with brother Ymer on home soil at the 2016 Stockholm Open.

=== 2018: First Grand Slam match win ===
Ymer secured a place in the main draw for the 2018 French Open winning three qualifying matches. There he won his first Grand Slam main draw match, beating Dudi Sela in straight sets.

=== 2022–2024: First ATP semifinal and top-20 win ===
In 2022, he defeated top seed and World No. 15 Aslan Karatsev in straight sets in second round of 2022 Maharashtra Open for his first top-20 win in his career to reach the quarterfinal, only his second since Gstaad in 2016. He went one step further reaching his maiden semifinal by defeating eight seed Stefano Travaglia. As a result he moved up 20 spots in the rankings back into the top 140 on 7 February 2022.

Ranked No. 170 at the 2023 Abierto Mexicano Telcel he reached the main draw as a lucky loser after the withdrawal of Cameron Norrie and defeated Adrian Mannarino to reach the second round. As a result he moved 20 positions up back to the top 150.

At the 2023 Stockholm Open he reached the quarterfinals as a wildcard defeating Roberto Bautista Agut and qualifier Dino Prizmic.

Ranked No. 206, he qualified for the 2024 Wimbledon Championships.

== ATP career finals ==
=== Doubles: 1 (1 title) ===
Legend Grand Slam Tournaments (0–0) ATP World Tour Finals (0–0) ATP World Tour Masters 1000 (0–0) ATP World Tour 500 Series (0–0) ATP World Tour 250 Series (1–0)	Finals by surface Hard (1–0) Clay (0–0) Grass (0–0)

Result	W–L	Date	Tournament	Tier	Surface	Partner	Opponents	Score
Win	1–0	Oct 2016	Stockholm Open, Sweden	250 Series	Hard (i)	(Sweden) Mikael Ymer	(Croatia) Mate Pavić (New Zealand) Michael Venus	6–1, 6–1

== ATP Challengers and ITF Futures finals ==
=== Singles: 17 (11–6) ===
ATP Challengers (6–4)
ITF Futures (5–1)

Result	W–L	Date	Tournament	Tier	Surface	Opponent	Score
Loss	0–1	Sep 2013	Sweden F6, Falun	Futures	Hard (i)	(Switzerland) Adrien Bossel	2–6, 6–4, 1–6
Win	1–1	Apr 2014	Egypt F12, Sharm el Sheikh	Futures	Clay	(Serbia) Marko Tepavac	6–2, 6–3
Win	2–1	Apr 2014	Egypt F13, Sharm El Sheikh	Futures	Clay	(France) Gleb Sakharov	7–5, 6–4
Win	3–1	May 2014	Sweden, Båstad	Futures	Clay	(Sweden) Patrik Rosenholm	6–3, 4–6, 7–6^{(8–6)}
Win	4–1	Jun 2014	Romania F3, Bacău	Futures	Clay	(Dominican Republic) José Hernández-Fernández	3–6, 7–6^{(7–2)}, 7–5
Win	5–1	Jun 2014	Netherlands F2, Alkmaar	Futures	Clay	(Chile) Jorge Aguilar	6–1, 5–7, 6–2
Win	6-1	Jun 2015	Caltanissetta, Italy	Challenger	Clay	(United States) Bjorn Fratangelo	6–3, 6–2
Win	7-1	Apr 2016	Barletta, Italy	Challenger	Clay	(Czech Republic) Adam Pavlásek	7–5, 6–4
Win	8-1	Aug 2017	Cordenons, Italy	Challenger	Clay	(Spain) Roberto Carballés Baena	6–2, 6–3
Win	9-1	Nov 2017	Mouilleron-le-Captif, France	Challenger	Hard (i)	(Germany) Yannick Maden	7–5, 6–4
Win	10-1	Nov 2018	Mouilleron-le-Captif, France	Challenger	Hard (i)	(Germany) Yannick Maden	6–3, 7–6^{(7–5)}
Win	11-1	Nov 2018	Pune, India	Challenger	Hard	(India) Prajnesh Gunneswaran	6–2, 7–5
Loss	11-2	Jun 2019	Lyon, France	Challenger	Clay	(France) Corentin Moutet	4–6, 4–6
Loss	11-3	Jun 2021	Lyon, France	Challenger	Clay	(Uruguay) Pablo Cuevas	2–6, 2–6
Loss	11-4	Jun 2022	Parma, Italy	Challenger	Clay	(Croatia) Borna Ćorić	6-7^{(4-7)}, 0-6
Loss	11–5	May 2024	Open de Oeiras, Portugal	Challenger	Clay	(Portugal) Jaime Faria	6–3, 6–7^{(3–7)}, 4–6
Loss	11–6	Feb 2025	Chennai, India	Challenger	Hard	(France) Kyrian Jacquet	6–7^{(1–7)}, 4–6
Loss	11–7	Nov 2025	Kobe, Japan	Challenger	Hard (i)	(Japan) Yosuke Watanuki	6–3, 1–6, 4–6

=== Doubles: 1 (0–1) ===
ATP Challengers (0–1)
ITF Futures (0–0)

Result	W–L	Date	Tournament	Tier	Surface	Partner	Opponents	Score
Loss	0–1	Jul 2014	Tampere, Finland	Challenger	Clay	(Russia) Anton Zaitcev	(Philippines) Ruben Gonzales (United Kingdom) Sean Thornley	7–6^{(7–5)}, 6–7^{(10–12)}, [8–10]

== Performance timelines ==
Key
W	F	SF	QF	#R	RR	Q#	P#	DNQ	A	Z#	PO	G	S	B	NMS	NTI	P	NH

(W) winner; (F) finalist; (SF) semifinalist; (QF) quarterfinalist; (#R) rounds 4, 3, 2, 1; (RR) round-robin stage; (Q#) qualification round; (P#) preliminary round; (DNQ) did not qualify; (A) absent; (Z#) Davis/Fed Cup Zonal Group (with number indication) or (PO) play-off; (G) gold, (S) silver or (B) bronze Olympic/Paralympic medal; (NMS) not a Masters tournament; (NTI) not a Tier I tournament; (P) postponed; (NH) not held; (SR) strike rate (events won / competed); (W–L) win–loss record.
To avoid confusion and double counting, these charts are updated at the conclusion of a tournament or when the player's participation has ended.

=== Singles ===
Current through the 2026 Australian Open.

Tournament	2013	2014	2015	2016	2017	2018	2019	2020	2021	2022	2023	2024	2025	2026	SR	W–L
Grand Slam tournaments
Australian Open	A	A	1R	Q1	Q1	1R	A	A	1R	Q3	Q2	Q1	A	1R	0 / 4	0–4
French Open	A	A	1R	Q2	Q2	2R	Q1	Q2	Q1	Q1	1R	Q1	A	Q1	0 / 3	1–3
Wimbledon	A	A	1R	A	Q2	Q1	Q1	NH	Q1	1R	Q2	1R	A		0 / 3	0–3
US Open	A	A	1R	A	A	Q1	Q1	A	Q1	Q1	Q1	Q1	Q1		0 / 1	0–1
Win–loss	0–0	0–0	0–4	0–0	0–0	1–2	0-0	0–0	0–1	0–1	0–1	0–1	0–0	0–1	0 / 11	1–11
National representation
Davis Cup	Z1	Z1	Z1	Z1	Z2	Z1	QR	QF		RR	RR	G1	A	0 / 3	18–18	
ATP Masters 1000
Indian Wells Open	A	A	A	A	1R	A	1R	NH	A	Q1	Q1	Q1	A	0 / 2	0–2	
Miami Open	A	Q1	Q2	1R	Q1	Q2	Q1	NH	A	Q2	Q1	Q1	A	0 / 1	0–1	
Monte-Carlo Masters	A	A	Q2	A	A	A	Q2	NH	A	A	A	A	A	0 / 0	0–0	
Madrid Open	A	A	A	A	A	A	A	NH	A	A	Q1	A	A	0 / 0	0–0	
Italian Open	A	A	A	A	A	A	A	Q1	A	A	Q2	A	A	0 / 0	0–0	
Canadian Open	A	A	A	A	A	Q2	A	NH	A	A	A	A	A	0 / 0	0–0	
Win–loss	0–0	0–0	0–0	0–1	0–1	0–0	0–1	0–0	0–0	0–0	0–0	0–0	0–0	0 / 3	0–3	
Career statistics
Tournaments	1	2	8	7	5	7	5	0	7	7	9	4	2	64		
Overall win–loss	1–2	2–5	4–9	2–9	4–5	5–9	1–7	0–1	5–8	12–8	5–12	3–5	1–2	45–82		
Year-end ranking	769	228	136	160	144	115	176	205	170	127	155	327		35%		

=== Doubles ===
	2014	2015	2016	2017	2018	2019	2020	2021	2022	2023	2024	2025	W–L
Career statistics
Tournaments	1	0	1	2	4	2	0	2	3	0	0	1	16
Titles / Finals	0 / 0	0 / 0	1 / 1	0 / 0	0 / 0	0 / 0	0 / 0	0 / 0	0 / 0	0 / 0	0 / 0	0 / 0	1 / 1
Overall win–loss	0–1	0–0	4–0	2–2	1–4	0–2	0–0	2–2	2–5	0–1	0–0	0–1	11–18
Year-end ranking	705	663	252	448	385	368	417	395	828	1347	–		38%
