= Mouilleron-le-Captif =

- Commune
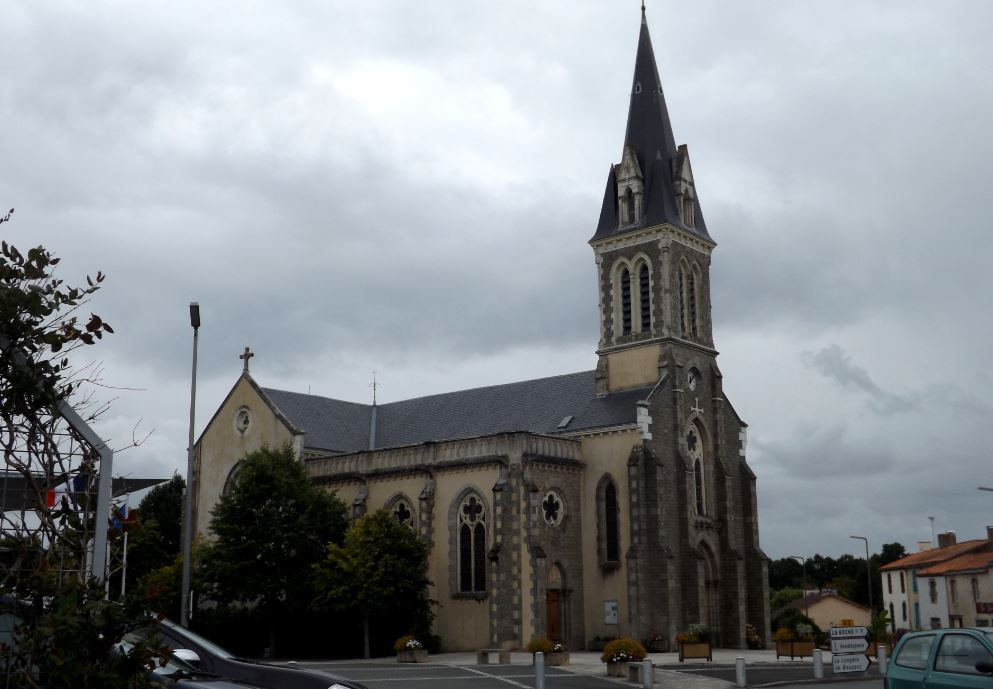
- The church of Saint-Martin of Tours, in Mouilleron

- Coat of arms
- Location of Mouilleron-le-Captif
- Location within France Location within Pays de la Loire
- Coordinates: 46°43′05″N 1°27′15″W
- Country: France
- Region: Pays de la Loire
- Department: Vendée
- Arrondissement: La Roche-sur-Yon
- Canton: La Roche-sur-Yon-1
- Intercommunality: La Roche-sur-Yon Agglomération

Government
  - Mayor (2020–2026): Jacky Godard
- Area^{1}: 19.73 km^{2} (7.62 sq mi)
- Highest elevation: 83 m (272 ft)
- Lowest elevation: 49 m (161 ft)
- Population (2023): 5,273
  - Density: 267.3/km^{2} (692.2/sq mi)
- Time zone: UTC+01:00 (CET)
  - Summer (DST): UTC+02:00 (CEST)
- INSEE/Postal code: 85155 /85000
- ^{1} French Land Register data, which excludes lakes, ponds, glaciers > 1 km^{2} (0.386 sq mi or 247 acres) and river estuaries.

Mouilleron-le-Captif (French pronunciation: [mujʁɔ̃ lə kaptif]) is a commune in the Vendée department in the Pays de la Loire region in western France.

== Population ==
Historical population
Year	Pop.	±% p.a.
1968	1,124	—
1975	1,894	+7.74%
1982	2,927	+6.42%
1990	3,238	+1.27%
1999	3,493	+0.85%
2007	4,246	+2.47%
2012	4,803	+2.50%
2017	4,928	+0.52%
2023	5,273	+1.13%
Source: INSEE

== See also ==
- Communes of the Vendée department
