= Open de Vendée =

- 2025 Open de Vendée

ATP Challenger Tour
- Location: Mouilleron-le-Captif, France
- Venue: Vendéspace
- Category: ATP Challenger Tour (2025-), Challenger 100 (-2024)
- Surface: Hard (Indoor)
- Draw: 32S/32Q/16D
- Prize money: €91,250 (2025), 120,950+H (2024)
- Website: www.opendevendee.fr

The Open de Vendée (formerly Internationaux de Tennis de Vendée) is a tennis tournament held in Mouilleron-le-Captif, France since 2013. The event is part of the ATP Challenger Tour and is played on indoor hardcourts.

== Past finals ==
=== Singles ===
Year	Champion	Runner-up	Score
2026	(France) Clément Chidekh	(France) Sascha Gueymard Wayenburg	6–2, 6–0
2025	(Norway) Nicolai Budkov Kjær	(United States) Patrick Kypson	6–0, 6–3
2024	(France) Lucas Pouille	(France) Quentin Halys	6–4, 6–4
2023	(Czech Republic) Tomáš Macháč	(United Kingdom) Arthur Fery	6–3, 6–4
2022	(Netherlands) Jelle Sels	(Canada) Vasek Pospisil	6–4, 6–3
2021	(Czech Republic) Jiří Veselý	(Slovakia) Norbert Gombos	6–4, 6–4
2020	Not Held		
2019	(Sweden) Mikael Ymer	(France) Mathias Bourgue	6–1, 6–4
2018	(Sweden) Elias Ymer (2)	(Germany) Yannick Maden	6–3, 7–6^{(7–5)}
2017	(Sweden) Elias Ymer (1)	(Germany) Yannick Maden	7–5, 6–4
2016	(France) Julien Benneteau	(Russia) Andrey Rublev	7–5, 2–6, 6–3
2015	(France) Benoît Paire	(France) Lucas Pouille	6–4, 1–6, 7–6^{(9–7)}
2014	(France) Pierre-Hugues Herbert	(Turkey) Marsel İlhan	6–2, 6–3
2013	(Germany) Michael Berrer	(France) Nicolas Mahut	1–6, 6–4, 6–3

=== Doubles ===
Year	Champions	Runners-up	Score
2026	(United States) Karl Poling (United States) Joshua Sheehy	(United Kingdom) Finn Bass (United Kingdom) Scott Duncan	7–6^{(7–4)}, 4–6, [10–3]
2025	(France) Grégoire Jacq (France) Albano Olivetti	(United Kingdom) Hamish Stewart (United Kingdom) Harry Wendelken	7–6^{(7–5)}, 6–3
2024	(Brazil) Marcelo Demoliner (United States) Christian Harrison	(Denmark) August Holmgren (Denmark) Johannes Ingildsen	6–3, 7–5
2023	(United Kingdom) Julian Cash (United States) Robert Galloway	(United States) Maxime Cressy (Finland) Otto Virtanen	6–4, 5–7, [12–10]
2022	(Netherlands) Sander Arends (2) (Netherlands) David Pel	(India) Purav Raja (India) Divij Sharan	6–7^{(1–7)}, 7–6^{(8–6)}, [10–6]
2021	(France) Jonathan Eysseric (3) (France) Quentin Halys	(Netherlands) David Pel (Pakistan) Aisam-ul-Haq Qureshi	4–6, 7–6^{(7–5)}, [10–8]
2020	Not Held		
2019	(United Kingdom) Jonny O'Mara (United Kingdom) Ken Skupski	(Netherlands) Sander Arends (Netherlands) David Pel	6–1, 6–4
2018	(Belgium) Sander Gillé (Belgium) Joran Vliegen	(Monaco) Romain Arneodo (France) Quentin Halys	6–3, 4–6, [10–2]
2017	(Germany) Andre Begemann (France) Jonathan Eysseric (2)	(Poland) Tomasz Bednarek (Netherlands) David Pel	6–3, 6–4
2016	(France) Jonathan Eysseric (1) (France) Édouard Roger-Vasselin	(Sweden) Johan Brunström (Sweden) Andreas Siljeström	6–7^{(1–7)}, 7–6^{(7–3)}, [11–9]
2015	(Netherlands) Sander Arends (1) (Poland) Adam Majchrowicz	(Belarus) Aliaksandr Bury (Sweden) Andreas Siljeström	6–3, 5–7, [10–8]
2014	(France) Pierre-Hugues Herbert (France) Nicolas Mahut	(Germany) Tobias Kamke (Germany) Philipp Marx	6–3, 6–4
2013	(France) Fabrice Martin (France) Hugo Nys	(Finland) Henri Kontinen (Spain) Adrián Menéndez Maceiras	3–6, 6–3, [10–8]
