= 2018 Koblenz Open – Doubles =

Doubles
- 2018 Koblenz Open

Final
- Champions: (Monaco) Romain Arneodo (Austria) Tristan-Samuel Weissborn
- Runners-up: (Netherlands) Sander Arends (Croatia) Antonio Šančić
- Score: 6–7^{(4–7)}, 7–5, [10–6]

Events
Singles	Doubles
← 2017 ·	Koblenz Open	· 2019 →

Hans Podlipnik-Castillo and Andrei Vasilevski were the defending champions but chose not to defend their title.

Romain Arneodo and Tristan-Samuel Weissborn won the title after defeating Sander Arends and Antonio Šančić 6–7^{(4–7)}, 7–5, [10–6] in the final.

== Seeds ==
1. (Netherlands) Sander Arends / (Croatia) Antonio Šančić (final)
2. (Monaco) Romain Arneodo / (Austria) Tristan-Samuel Weissborn (champions)
3. (Belgium) Sander Gillé / (Belgium) Joran Vliegen (semifinals)
4. (India) Sriram Balaji / (India) Vishnu Vardhan (first round)

== Draw ==
=== Key ===
- Q = Qualifier
- WC = Wild card
- LL = Lucky loser
- Alt = Alternate
- SE = Special exempt
- PR = Protected ranking
- ITF = ITF entry
- JE = Junior exempt
- w/o = Walkover
- r = Retired
- d = Defaulted
- SR = Special ranking

First round
1	(Netherlands) S Arends (Croatia) A Šančić	6	6
(Japan) T Matsui (Italy) A Motti	4	4
(Switzerland) L Margaroli (Japan) Y Uchiyama	4	3
(Czech Republic) Z Kolář (Czech Republic) A Pavlásek	6	6
4	(India) S Balaji (India) V Vardhan	4	6^{7}
WC	(Germany) J Choinski (Germany) M Möller	6	7^{9}
(Poland) T Bednarek (Netherlands) D Pel	6^{12}	4
(Poland) G Panfil (Ukraine) V Uzhylovskyi	7^{14}	6
(Croatia) I Sabanov (Croatia) M Sabanov	4	6	[13]
(Germany) K Krawietz (South Africa) R Roelofse	6	3	[11]
WC	(Germany) Raphael Loukas (Croatia) N Serdarušić	2	2
3	(Belgium) S Gillé (Belgium) J Vliegen	6	6
(Germany) M Moraing (Germany) O Otte	2	6	[15]
WC	(Germany) B Hassan (Spain) N Kuhn	6	4	[13]
(Croatia) M Draganja (Croatia) T Draganja	4	6	[3]
2	(Monaco) R Arneodo (Austria) T-S Weissborn	6	1	[10]

Quarterfinals
1	(Netherlands) S Arends (Croatia) A Šančić	7^{7}	2	[10]
(Czech Republic) Z Kolář (Czech Republic) A Pavlásek	6^{2}	6	[5]
WC	(Germany) J Choinski (Germany) M Möller	6	1	[4]
(Poland) G Panfil (Ukraine) V Uzhylovskyi	4	6	[10]
(Croatia) I Sabanov (Croatia) M Sabanov	7^{9}	4	[6]
3	(Belgium) S Gillé (Belgium) J Vliegen	6^{7}	6	[10]
(Germany) M Moraing (Germany) O Otte
2	(Monaco) R Arneodo (Austria) T-S Weissborn	w/o

Semifinals
1	(Netherlands) S Arends (Croatia) A Šančić	6	3	[11]
(Poland) G Panfil (Ukraine) V Uzhylovskyi	4	6	[9]
3	(Belgium) S Gillé (Belgium) J Vliegen	6	3	[4]
2	(Monaco) R Arneodo (Austria) T-S Weissborn	3	6	[10]

Final
1	(Netherlands) S Arends (Croatia) A Šančić	7^{7}	5	[6]
2	(Monaco) R Arneodo (Austria) T-S Weissborn	6^{4}	7	[10]
