= 2020 Koblenz Open – Doubles =

Doubles
- 2020 Koblenz Open

Final
- Champions: (Netherlands) Sander Arends (Netherlands) David Pel
- Runners-up: (Germany) Julian Lenz (Germany) Yannick Maden
- Score: 7–6^{(7–4)}, 7–6^{(7–3)}

Events
Singles	Doubles
← 2019 ·	Koblenz Open	· 2023 →

Zdeněk Kolář and Adam Pavlásek were the defending champions but chose not to defend their title.

Sander Arends and David Pel won the title after defeating Julian Lenz and Yannick Maden 7–6^{(7–4)}, 7–6^{(7–3)} in the final.

== Seeds ==
1. (Netherlands) Sander Arends / (Netherlands) David Pel (champions)
2. (Croatia) Antonio Šančić / (Austria) Tristan-Samuel Weissborn (quarterfinals)
3. (Germany) Andre Begemann / (Romania) Florin Mergea (semifinals)
4. (Monaco) Romain Arneodo / (France) Quentin Halys (quarterfinals)

== Draw ==
=== Key ===
- Q = Qualifier
- WC = Wild card
- LL = Lucky loser
- Alt = Alternate
- SE = Special exempt
- PR = Protected ranking
- ITF = ITF entry
- JE = Junior exempt
- w/o = Walkover
- r = Retired
- d = Defaulted
- SR = Special ranking

First round
1	(Netherlands) S Arends (Netherlands) D Pel	6	6
(Czech Republic) V Kopřiva (Czech Republic) V Šafránek	4	2
(France) D Added (Sweden) M Eriksson	6^{3}	2
(Netherlands) T Griekspoor (Netherlands) B van de Zandschulp	7^{7}	6
3	(Germany) A Begemann (Romania) F Mergea	7^{8}	4	[10]
(India) S Balaji (India) J Nedunchezhiyan	6^{6}	6	[6]
(Germany) D Brown (Austria) L Miedler	6	6
WC	(Germany) L Wessels (Germany) Leopold Zima	4	2
(Russia) M Elgin (Russia) T Gabashvili	6^{5}	4
(Germany) J Lenz (Germany) Y Maden	7^{7}	6
(Czech Republic) M Gengel (Czech Republic) M Vrbenský	4	1
4	(Monaco) R Arneodo (France) Q Halys	6	6
(Croatia) I Sabanov (Croatia) M Sabanov	4	6	[6]
(Belgium) R Bemelmans (Germany) D Masur	6	3	[10]
WC	(Germany) Lucas Gerch (Germany) Johann Willems	1	5
2/WC	(Croatia) A Šančić (Austria) T-S Weissborn	6	7

Quarterfinals
1	(Netherlands) S Arends (Netherlands) D Pel	3	7^{7}	[12]
(Netherlands) T Griekspoor (Netherlands) B van de Zandschulp	6	6^{2}	[10]
3	(Germany) A Begemann (Romania) F Mergea	2	7^{7}	[10]
(Germany) D Brown (Austria) L Miedler	6	6^{4}	[5]
(Germany) J Lenz (Germany) Y Maden	6	6
4	(Monaco) R Arneodo (France) Q Halys	4	2
(Belgium) R Bemelmans (Germany) D Masur	5	7	[10]
2/WC	(Croatia) A Šančić (Austria) T-S Weissborn	7	5	[5]

Semifinals
1	(Netherlands) S Arends (Netherlands) D Pel	3	6	[10]
3	(Germany) A Begemann (Romania) F Mergea	6	3	[7]
(Germany) J Lenz (Germany) Y Maden	2	6	[10]
(Belgium) R Bemelmans (Germany) D Masur	6	1	[2]

Final
1	(Netherlands) S Arends (Netherlands) D Pel	7^{7}	7^{7}
(Germany) J Lenz (Germany) Y Maden	6^{4}	6^{3}
