= 2023 Koblenz Open – Singles =

Singles
- 2023 Koblenz Open

Final
- Champion: Roman Safiullin
- Runner-up: (Canada) Vasek Pospisil
- Score: 6–2, 7–5

Events
Singles	Doubles
← 2020 ·	Koblenz Open	· 2024 →

Tomáš Macháč was the defending champion but chose not to defend his title.

Roman Safiullin won the title after defeating Vasek Pospisil 6–2, 7–5 in the final.

== Seeds ==
1. (China) Zhang Zhizhen (second round)
2. Roman Safiullin (champion)
3. (Canada) Vasek Pospisil (final)
4. (Germany) Maximilian Marterer (quarterfinals, retired)
5. (France) Hugo Grenier (second round)
6. (United Kingdom) Liam Broady (second round)
7. (France) Alexandre Müller (quarterfinals)
8. (Netherlands) Gijs Brouwer (first round)

== Draw ==
Key

- Q = Qualifier
- WC = Wild card
- LL = Lucky loser
- Alt = Alternate
- ITF = ITF entry
- PR = Protected ranking
- SR = Special ranking
- SE = Special exempt
- JE = Junior exempt
- JR = Junior Accelerator Programme entrant
- CO = College Accelerator Programme entrant
- NG = Next Gen Accelerator Program entrant
- w/o = Walkover
- r = Retired
- d = Defaulted

=== Finals ===
Semifinals
(Czech Republic) Zdeněk Kolář	1	3
3	(Canada) Vasek Pospisil	6	6
Alt	(Belgium) Raphaël Collignon	7	3	0
2	Roman Safiullin	5	6	6

Final
3	(Canada) Vasek Pospisil	2	5
2	Roman Safiullin	6	7

=== Top half ===
First round
1	(China) Zh Zhang	6	5	6
WC	(Germany) H Squire	1	7	4
(Czech Republic) Z Kolář	6	6
(Switzerland) A Bellier	2	4
(United Kingdom) J Choinski	6	1	6
Q	(Kazakhstan) D Yevseyev	4	6	2
WC	(Germany) MH Rehberg	4	4
7	(France) A Müller	6	6
3	(Canada) V Pospisil	7	6
(United States) Em Nava	5	2
Q	(Germany) M Rosenkranz	4	6	6
(France) L Lokoli	6	4	3
Q	(France) A Hoang	6^{6}	6	2
Alt	(Germany) L Wessels	7^{8}	3	6
Alt	(Germany) Lucas Gerch	2	2
5	(France) H Grenier	6	6

Second round
1	(China) Zh Zhang	6	3	3
(Czech Republic) Z Kolář	3	6	6
(United Kingdom) J Choinski	3	7^{7}	5
7	(France) A Müller	6	6^{4}	7
3	(Canada) V Pospisil	7^{8}	7^{7}
Q	(Germany) M Rosenkranz	6^{6}	6^{2}
Alt	(Germany) L Wessels	6	6
5	(France) H Grenier	4	3

Quarterfinals
(Czech Republic) Z Kolář	7^{7}	4	7^{7}
7	(France) A Müller	6^{5}	6	6^{3}
3	(Canada) V Pospisil	6	6
Alt	(Germany) L Wessels	4	2

Semifinals
(Czech Republic) Z Kolář	1	3
3	(Canada) V Pospisil	6	6

=== Bottom half ===
First round
8	(Netherlands) G Brouwer	7	6^{2}	3
Alt	(Belgium) R Collignon	5	7^{7}	6
(Italy) L Nardi	6^{9}	3
(Switzerland) H Laaksonen	7^{11}	6
Alt	(Germany) D Masur	5	3
(Bulgaria) A Andreev	7	6
Q	(Ukraine) V Sachko	5	2
4	(Germany) M Marterer	7	6
6	(United Kingdom) L Broady	7^{7}	6
Alt	(Netherlands) R Haase	6^{2}	1
Q	A Vatutin	7^{8}	6
Q	(Germany) J Härteis	6^{6}	1
WC	(Germany) M Topo	4	7^{7}	6^{6}
(France) A Escoffier	6	6^{5}	7^{8}
(France) G Blancaneaux	7	3	1
2	R Safiullin	5	6	6

Second round
Alt	(Belgium) R Collignon	7	6
(Switzerland) H Laaksonen	5	4
(Bulgaria) A Andreev	3	3
4	(Germany) M Marterer	6	6
6	(United Kingdom) L Broady	2	3
Q	A Vatutin	6	6
(France) A Escoffier	3	6	6^{2}
2	R Safiullin	6	4	7^{7}

Quarterfinals
Alt	(Belgium) R Collignon	5
4	(Germany) M Marterer	2^{r}
Q	A Vatutin	3	6	2
2	R Safiullin	6	1	6

Semifinals
Alt	(Belgium) R Collignon	7	3	0
2	R Safiullin	5	6	6
