= 2018 Koblenz Open – Singles =

Singles
- 2018 Koblenz Open

Final
- Champion: (Germany) Mats Moraing
- Runner-up: (France) Kenny de Schepper
- Score: 6–2, 6–1

Events
Singles	Doubles
← 2017 ·	Koblenz Open	· 2019 →

Ruben Bemelmans was the defending champion but withdrew as he qualified for the 2018 Australian Open.

Mats Moraing won the title after defeating Kenny de Schepper 6–2, 6–1 in the final.

== Seeds ==
1. (Russia) Andrey Kuznetsov (first round)
2. (Italy) Marco Cecchinato (second round)
3. (Ukraine) Sergiy Stakhovsky (semifinals)
4. (Germany) Oscar Otte (first round)
5. (Germany) Yannick Maden (quarterfinals)
6. (France) Kenny de Schepper (final)
7. (Slovakia) Andrej Martin (first round)
8. (Spain) Tommy Robredo (first round)

== Draw ==
=== Key ===
- Q = Qualifier
- WC = Wild card
- LL = Lucky loser
- Alt = Alternate
- SE = Special exempt
- PR = Protected ranking
- ITF = ITF entry
- JE = Junior exempt
- w/o = Walkover
- r = Retired
- d = Defaulted
- SR = Special ranking

=== Finals ===
Semifinals
Alt	(Belarus) Ilya Ivashka	6	5	4
6	(France) Kenny de Schepper	3	7	6
3/Alt	(Ukraine) Sergiy Stakhovsky	4	3
WC	(Germany) Mats Moraing	6	6

Final
6	(France) Kenny de Schepper	2	1
WC	(Germany) Mats Moraing	6	6

=== Top half ===
First round
1	(Russia) A Kuznetsov	4	6	3
Alt	(Belarus) I Ivashka	6	4	6
(Egypt) K-M Maamoun	3	3
Q	(Belgium) Christopher Heyman	6	6
(Israel) E Leshem	3	7	3
(Kazakhstan) D Popko	6	5	6
(Czech Republic) A Pavlásek	2	2
5	(Germany) Y Maden	6	6
4	(Germany) O Otte	6^{6}	3
(Russia) A Vatutin	7^{8}	6
(Poland) H Hurkacz	6	6
(Hungary) A Balázs	4	2
(Latvia) E Gulbis	4	6	1
WC	(Germany) B Hassan	6	3	6
(Russia) T Gabashvili	7^{7}	1	2
6	(France) K de Schepper	6^{5}	6	6

Second round
Alt	(Belarus) I Ivashka	6	6
Q	(Belgium) C Heyman	4	4
(Kazakhstan) D Popko	5	4
5	(Germany) Y Maden	7	6
(Russia) A Vatutin	3	6	7^{7}
(Poland) H Hurkacz	6	0	6^{5}
WC	(Germany) B Hassan	7^{7}	1	4
6	(France) K de Schepper	6^{4}	6	6

Quarterfinals
Alt	(Belarus) I Ivashka	6	6
5	(Germany) Y Maden	1	2
(Russia) A Vatutin	6	6^{7}	1
6	(France) K de Schepper	3	7^{9}	6

Semifinals
Alt	(Belarus) I Ivashka	6	5	4
6	(France) K de Schepper	3	7	6

=== Bottom half ===
First round
8/Alt	(Spain) T Robredo	1	7	6^{6}
WC	(Germany) J Choinski	6	5	7^{8}
(Egypt) M Safwat	3	7	6
Q	(Slovakia) F Horanský	6	5	3
(Spain) N Kuhn	6	6
Q	(Sweden) M Ymer	3	3
Q	(Belgium) J De Loore	2	3
3/Alt	(Ukraine) S Stakhovsky	6	6
7	(Slovakia) A Martin	2	4
(Czech Republic) Z Kolář	6	6
(Japan) Y Uchiyama	6	6
WC	(Germany) M Möller	3	1
(Bosnia and Herzegovina) T Brkić	7^{7}	5	2
WC	(Germany) M Moraing	6^{2}	7	6
(Italy) A Arnaboldi	7^{7}	4	2
2	(Italy) M Cecchinato	6^{2}	6	6

Second round
WC	(Germany) J Choinski	3	6	4
(Egypt) M Safwat	6	3	6
(Spain) N Kuhn	4	3
3/Alt	(Ukraine) S Stakhovsky	6	6
(Czech Republic) Z Kolář	2	1
(Japan) Y Uchiyama	6	6
WC	(Germany) M Moraing	6	6
2	(Italy) M Cecchinato	4	4

Quarterfinals
(Egypt) M Safwat	2	1
3/Alt	(Ukraine) S Stakhovsky	6	6
(Japan) Y Uchiyama	4	6^{2}
WC	(Germany) M Moraing	6	7^{7}

Semifinals
3/Alt	(Ukraine) S Stakhovsky	4	3
WC	(Germany) M Moraing	6	6
