= 2020 Koblenz Open =

- Date: 17–23 February
- Edition: 4th
- Surface: Hard (indoor)
- Location: Koblenz, Germany

Champions

Singles
- (Czech Republic) Tomáš Macháč

Doubles
- (Netherlands) Sander Arends / (Netherlands) David Pel
← 2019 ·	Koblenz Open	· 2023 →

The 2020 Koblenz Open was a professional tennis tournament played on indoor hard courts. It was the fourth edition of the tournament which was part of the 2020 ATP Challenger Tour. It took place in Koblenz, Germany from 17 to 23 February 2020.

== Singles main-draw entrants ==
=== Seeds ===
Country	Player	Rank^{1}	Seed
GER	Yannick Maden	143	1
GER	Yannick Hanfmann	151	2
NED	Tallon Griekspoor	172	3
GER	Oscar Otte	177	4
FRA	Maxime Janvier	179	5
NED	Botic van de Zandschulp	201	6
FRA	Quentin Halys	203	7
GER	Mats Moraing	225	8
GER	Julian Lenz	241	9
GER	Dustin Brown	242	10
ESP	Nicola Kuhn	246	11
BEL	Ruben Bemelmans	251	12
GER	Daniel Masur	253	13
RUS	Teymuraz Gabashvili	270	14
AUT	Lucas Miedler	277	15
RUS	Pavel Kotov	282	16

- ^{1} Rankings are as of 10 February 2020.

=== Other entrants ===
The following players received wildcards into the singles main draw:

- (Germany) Nino Ehrenschneider
- (Czech Republic) Marek Gengel
- (Germany) Milan Welte
- (Germany) Louis Wessels
- (Germany) Leopold Zima

The following players received entry from the qualifying draw:

- (Germany) Lucas Gerch
- (India) Sasikumar Mukund

The following player received entry as a lucky loser:

- (Turkey) Ergi Kırkın

== Champions ==
=== Singles ===
- (Czech Republic) Tomáš Macháč def. (Netherlands) Botic van de Zandschulp 6–3, 4–6, 6–3.

=== Doubles ===
- (Netherlands) Sander Arends / (Netherlands) David Pel def. (Germany) Julian Lenz / (Germany) Yannick Maden 7–6^{(7–4)}, 7–6^{(7–3)}.
