= 2019 Koblenz Open – Singles =

Singles
- 2019 Koblenz Open

Final
- Champion: (Italy) Gianluca Mager
- Runner-up: (Spain) Roberto Ortega Olmedo
- Score: 2–6, 7–6^{(8–6)}, 6–2

Events
Singles	Doubles
- Koblenz Open

Mats Moraing was the defending champion but chose not to defend his title.

Gianluca Mager won the title after defeating Roberto Ortega Olmedo 2–6, 7–6^{(8–6)}, 6–2 in the final.

== Seeds ==
All seeds receive a bye into the second round.

1. (Norway) Casper Ruud (third round)
2. (Germany) Yannick Maden (third round)
3. (Russia) Alexey Vatutin (quarterfinals, retired)
4. (Italy) Andrea Arnaboldi (second round)
5. (Germany) Daniel Brands (second round)
6. (United Kingdom) James Ward (second round)
7. (Sweden) Mikael Ymer (quarterfinals)
8. (Belgium) Arthur De Greef (second round)
9. (Czech Republic) Adam Pavlásek (third round)
10. (Germany) Tobias Kamke (second round)
11. (Slovakia) Filip Horanský (third round)
12. (France) Kenny de Schepper (third round)
13. (Czech Republic) Zdeněk Kolář (second round)
14. (Netherlands) Tallon Griekspoor (semifinals)
15. (Netherlands) Thiemo de Bakker (third round)
16. (Belarus) Uladzimir Ignatik (third round)

== Draw ==
Key

- Q = Qualifier
- WC = Wild card
- LL = Lucky loser
- Alt = Alternate
- ITF = ITF entry
- PR = Protected ranking
- SR = Special ranking
- SE = Special exempt
- JE = Junior exempt
- JR = Junior Accelerator Programme entrant
- CO = College Accelerator Programme entrant
- NG = Next Gen Accelerator Program entrant
- w/o = Walkover
- r = Retired
- d = Defaulted

=== Finals ===
Quarterfinals
14	(Netherlands) Tallon Griekspoor	6	7
(Japan) Kaichi Uchida	3	5
3	(Russia) Alexey Vatutin	5	2^{r}
(Italy) Gianluca Mager	7	4
(Spain) Carlos Taberner	7	5	1
(Russia) Pavel Kotov	5	7	6
7	(Sweden) Mikael Ymer	7^{10}	1	3
(Spain) Roberto Ortega Olmedo	6^{8}	6	6

Semifinals
14	(Netherlands) Tallon Griekspoor	3	6	4
(Italy) Gianluca Mager	6	2	6
(Russia) Pavel Kotov	5	6	3
(Spain) Roberto Ortega Olmedo	7	3	6

Final
(Italy) Gianluca Mager	2	7^{8}	6
(Spain) Roberto Ortega Olmedo	6	6^{6}	2

=== Top half ===
==== Section 1 ====
First round
ITF	(Italy) R Brancaccio	6	7
Q	(Germany) L Wessels	4	5
PR	(Poland) M Przysiężny	4	6	6
ITF	(Spain) J Barranco Cosano	6	3	2
(France) TK Wang	6	6
(Germany) D Masur	4	2
(Japan) K Uchida	0	6	7
(Spain) B Zapata Miralles	6	2	5

Second round
1	(Norway) C Ruud	6	4	6
ITF	(Italy) R Brancaccio	4	6	3
PR	(Poland) M Przysiężny	0	6	3
14	(Netherlands) T Griekspoor	6	2	6
9	(Czech Republic) A Pavlásek	3	6	6
(France) TK Wang	6	3	4
(Japan) K Uchida	7^{7}	6
8	(Belgium) A De Greef	6^{0}	4

Third round
1	(Norway) C Ruud	6	1	2
14	(Netherlands) T Griekspoor	3	6	6
9	(Czech Republic) A Pavlásek	2	6	6^{3}
(Japan) K Uchida	6	3	7^{7}

Quarterfinals
14	(Netherlands) T Griekspoor	6	7
(Japan) K Uchida	3	5

==== Section 2 ====
First round
(Portugal) G Oliveira	6	6
LL	(Germany) Bastien Presuhn	2	2
Q	(Germany) P Torebko	6	1	6
WC	(Germany) Kai Lemstra	1	6	1
WC	(Germany) J Härteis	7^{7}	4	6
(Czech Republic) V Šafránek	6^{3}	6	3
(Italy) G Mager	6	6
ITF	(Germany) Peter Heller	4	4

Second round
3	(Russia) A Vatutin	3	7^{9}	6
(Portugal) G Oliveira	6	6^{7}	2
Q	(Germany) P Torebko	6^{5}	3
16	(Belarus) U Ignatik	7^{7}	6
11	(Slovakia) F Horanský	7^{15}	6
WC	(Germany) J Härteis	6^{13}	4
(Italy) G Mager	2	6	6
6	(United Kingdom) J Ward	6	4	4

Third round
3	(Russia) A Vatutin	6	6^{6}	7^{8}
16	(Belarus) U Ignatik	4	7^{8}	6^{6}
11	(Slovakia) F Horanský	6^{4}	3
(Italy) G Mager	7^{7}	6

Quarterfinals
3	(Russia) A Vatutin	5	2^{r}
(Italy) G Mager	7	4

=== Bottom half ===
==== Section 3 ====
First round
(Spain) C Taberner	6	5	6
WC	(Germany) J Lenz	4	7	2
(Russia) E Karlovskiy	6^{7}	6	5
(Dominican Republic) J Hernández-Fernández	7^{9}	4	7
(Croatia) N Serdarušić	4	2
WC	(Germany) B Hassan	6	6
(Lithuania) L Grigelis	6^{6}	3
(Russia) P Kotov	7^{8}	6

Second round
5	(Germany) D Brands	6^{2}	5
(Spain) C Taberner	7^{7}	7
(Dominican Republic) J Hernández-Fernández	2	1
12	(France) K de Schepper	6	6
15	(Netherlands) T de Bakker	6	6
WC	(Germany) B Hassan	1	4
(Russia) P Kotov	6	7
4	(Italy) A Arnaboldi	4	5

Third round
(Spain) C Taberner	7^{7}	6
12	(France) K de Schepper	6^{5}	2
15	(Netherlands) T de Bakker	2	6^{3}
(Russia) P Kotov	6	7^{7}

Quarterfinals
(Spain) C Taberner	7	5	1
(Russia) P Kotov	5	7	6

==== Section 4 ====
First round
(Hungary) Z Piros	4	6	6
(Netherlands) S Griekspoor	6	0	2
ITF	(Russia) R Safiullin	6	6
(India) S Nagal	2	1
WC	(Czech Republic) M Gengel	6^{1}	3
(Spain) R Ortega Olmedo	7^{7}	6
LL	(Italy) R Bonadio	6	6
(Italy) R Marcora	4	2

Second round
7	(Sweden) M Ymer	4	7^{7}	6
(Hungary) Z Piros	6	6^{0}	2
ITF	(Russia) R Safiullin	6	6^{4}	6
10	(Germany) T Kamke	0	7^{7}	3
13	(Czech Republic) Z Kolář	2	4
(Spain) R Ortega Olmedo	6	6
LL	(Italy) R Bonadio	2	2
2	(Germany) Y Maden	6	6

Third round
7	(Sweden) M Ymer	6	5	6
ITF	(Russia) R Safiullin	2	7	4
(Spain) R Ortega Olmedo	6	3	6
2	(Germany) Y Maden	4	6	3

Quarterfinals
7	(Sweden) M Ymer	7^{10}	1	3
(Spain) R Ortega Olmedo	6^{8}	6	6
