= 2026 Koblenz Open – Singles =

Singles
- 2026 Koblenz Open

Final
- Champion: Pavel Kotov
- Runner-up: (Germany) Tom Gentzsch
- Score: 6–4, 1–6, 7–6^{(10–8)}

Events
Singles	Doubles
- Koblenz Open

Ugo Blanchet was the defending champion but chose not to defend his title.

Pavel Kotov won the title after defeating Tom Gentzsch 6–4, 1–6, 7–6^{(10–8)} in the final.

== Seeds ==
1. (Czech Republic) Zdeněk Kolář (second round)
2. (France) Dan Added (quarterfinals)
3. (United Kingdom) Johannus Monday (first round, retired)
4. (Japan) Kaichi Uchida (quarterfinals)
5. (Germany) Henri Squire (first round)
6. (Germany) Patrick Zahraj (second round)
7. (Germany) Tom Gentzsch (final)
8. (Belgium) Michael Geerts (first round)

== Draw ==
Key

- Q = Qualifier
- WC = Wild card
- LL = Lucky loser
- Alt = Alternate
- ITF = ITF entry
- PR = Protected ranking
- SR = Special ranking
- SE = Special exempt
- JE = Junior exempt
- JR = Junior Accelerator Programme entrant
- CO = College Accelerator Programme entrant
- NG = Next Gen Accelerator Program entrant
- w/o = Walkover
- r = Retired
- d = Defaulted

=== Finals ===
Semifinals
Pavel Kotov	6	6
WC	(Germany) Max Schönhaus	4	0
7	(Germany) Tom Gentzsch	7^{7}	7^{7}
(Germany) Christoph Negritu	6^{3}	6^{3}

Final
Pavel Kotov	6	1	7^{10}
7	(Germany) Tom Gentzsch	4	6	6^{8}

=== Top half ===
First round
1	(Czech Republic) Z Kolář	6	6
(Spain) C Sánchez Jover	2	3
(Spain) A Barroso Campos	2	2
P Kotov	6	6
Q	(Germany) MH Rehberg	6	6
Q	(Germany) Liam Gavrielides	3	2
Q	(Belgium) B Gadamauri	2	6	6
5	(Germany) H Squire	6	1	3
4	(Japan) K Uchida	6	6
Q	(Switzerland) J Nikles	4	1
(Germany) M Wiskandt	7	2	6
WC	(Germany) N McDonald	5	6	3
WC	(Germany) M Schönhaus	5	7	6
Q	(Germany) Mika Petkovic	7	5	3
(Germany) M Rosenkranz	6	5^{r}
6	(Germany) P Zahraj	3	5

Second round
1	(Czech Republic) Z Kolář	4	3
P Kotov	6	6
Q	(Germany) MH Rehberg	6	5	7^{7}
Q	(Belgium) B Gadamauri	0	7	6^{2}
4	(Japan) K Uchida	7^{7}	7^{7}
(Germany) M Wiskandt	6^{4}	6^{5}
WC	(Germany) M Schönhaus	6	6
6	(Germany) P Zahraj	3	4

Quarterfinals
P Kotov	6	6
Q	(Germany) MH Rehberg	2	4
4	(Japan) K Uchida	5	7^{8}	2
WC	(Germany) M Schönhaus	7	6^{6}	6

Semifinals
P Kotov	6	6
WC	(Germany) M Schönhaus	4	0

=== Bottom half ===
First round
7	(Germany) T Gentzsch	6	5	6
WC	(Germany) D Dedura	3	7	4
Q	(Czech Republic) Matthew William Donald	4	5
(Czech Republic) M Krumich	6	7
(Ukraine) Vadym Ursu	2	1
(Czech Republic) J Forejtek	6	6
(Germany) F Broska	6	1
3	(United Kingdom) J Monday	3	0^{r}
8	(Belgium) M Geerts	6	3	6^{1}
(Germany) C Negritu	2	6	7^{7}
NG	(France) Maé Malige	6^{2}	6	4
(Belgium) T Colson	7^{7}	2	6
(Germany) R Molleker	2	7	6
(Germany) M Möller	6	5	3
(Germany) D Masur	6	2	4
2	(France) D Added	4	6	6

Second round
7	(Germany) T Gentzsch	6	6
(Czech Republic) M Krumich	3	4
(Czech Republic) J Forejtek	7^{7}	3	4
(Germany) F Broska	6^{5}	6	6
(Germany) C Negritu	7^{8}	7^{7}
(Belgium) T Colson	6^{6}	6^{4}
(Germany) R Molleker	4	7^{7}	6^{5}
2	(France) D Added	6	6^{3}	7^{7}

Quarterfinals
7	(Germany) T Gentzsch	6^{7}	6	6
(Germany) F Broska	7^{9}	2	2
(Germany) C Negritu	6^{5}	7	6
2	(France) D Added	7^{7}	5	4

Semifinals
7	(Germany) T Gentzsch	7^{7}	7^{7}
(Germany) C Negritu	6^{3}	6^{3}
