= 2023 Koblenz Open =

- Date: 30 January – 5 February
- Edition: 5th
- Surface: Hard (indoor)
- Location: Koblenz, Germany

Champions

Singles
- Roman Safiullin

Doubles
- (Germany) Fabian Fallert / (Germany) Hendrik Jebens
← 2020 ·	Koblenz Open	· 2024 →

The 2023 Koblenz Open powered by Montabaur was a professional tennis tournament played on indoor hard courts. It was the fifth edition of the tournament which was part of the 2023 ATP Challenger Tour. It took place in Koblenz, Germany from 30 January to 5 February 2023.

== Singles main-draw entrants ==
=== Seeds ===
Country	Player	Rank^{1}	Seed
CHN	Zhang Zhizhen	96	1
	Roman Safiullin	97	2
CAN	Vasek Pospisil	99	3
GER	Maximilian Marterer	142	4
FRA	Hugo Grenier	147	5
GBR	Liam Broady	158	6
FRA	Alexandre Müller	160	7
NED	Gijs Brouwer	161	8

- ^{1} Rankings are as of 16 January 2023.

=== Other entrants ===
The following players received wildcards into the singles main draw:

- (Germany) Max Hans Rehberg
- (Germany) Henri Squire
- (Germany) Marko Topo

The following players received entry into the singles main draw as alternates:

- (Belgium) Raphaël Collignon
- (Germany) Lucas Gerch
- (Netherlands) Robin Haase
- (Germany) Daniel Masur
- (Germany) Louis Wessels

The following players received entry from the qualifying draw:

- (Germany) Johannes Härteis
- (France) Antoine Hoang
- (Germany) Mats Rosenkranz
- (Ukraine) Vitaliy Sachko
- Alexey Vatutin
- (Kazakhstan) Denis Yevseyev

== Champions ==
=== Singles ===
- Roman Safiullin def. (Canada) Vasek Pospisil 6–2, 7–5.

=== Doubles ===
- (Germany) Fabian Fallert / (Germany) Hendrik Jebens def. (France) Jonathan Eysseric / (Ukraine) Denys Molchanov 7–6^{(7–2)}, 6–3.
