= 2025 Koblenz Open – Doubles =

Doubles
- 2025 Koblenz Open

Final
- Champions: (Switzerland) Jakub Paul (Netherlands) David Pel
- Runners-up: (France) Geoffrey Blancaneaux (United Kingdom) Joshua Paris
- Score: Walkover

Events
Singles	Doubles
- Koblenz Open

Sander Arends and Sem Verbeek were the defending champions but chose not to defend their title.

Jakub Paul and David Pel won the title via walkover after Geoffrey Blancaneaux and Joshua Paris withdrew before the final.

== Seeds ==
1. (United States) Reese Stalder / (United Kingdom) Marcus Willis (first round)
2. (Italy) Marco Bortolotti / (Venezuela) Luis David Martínez (quarterfinals)
3. (United States) Vasil Kirkov / (Netherlands) Mick Veldheer (quarterfinals)
4. (United States) Patrik Trhac / (Poland) Szymon Walków (quarterfinals)

== Draw ==
Key

- Q = Qualifier
- WC = Wild card
- LL = Lucky loser
- Alt = Alternate
- ITF = ITF entry
- PR = Protected ranking
- SR = Special ranking
- SE = Special exempt
- JE = Junior exempt
- JR = Junior Accelerator Programme entrant
- CO = College Accelerator Programme entrant
- NG = Next Gen Accelerator Program entrant
- w/o = Walkover
- r = Retired
- d = Defaulted

=== Draw ===
First round
1	(United States) R Stalder (United Kingdom) M Willis	3	4
(Romania) A Jecan; I Liutarevich	6	6
(Germany) C Negritu (Spain) D Vega Hernández	3	4
(France) G Blancaneaux (United Kingdom) J Paris	6	6
4	(United States) P Trhac (Poland) S Walków	6	5	[10]
WC	(Germany) D Masur (Germany) M Schönhaus	3	7	[8]
(Italy) Samuel Vincent Ruggeri (Italy) Augusto Virgili	6	4	[4]
WC	(Germany) T Rühl (Germany) P Zahraj	4	6	[10]
(France) A Escoffier (France) L Sanchez	3	3
(Switzerland) J Paul (Netherlands) D Pel	6	6
(France) U Blanchet (France) M Martineau	5	6	[10]
3	(United States) V Kirkov (Netherlands) M Veldheer	7	4	[12]
(Ukraine) D Molchanov (Czech Republic) M Vrbenský	7^{7}	6
(Czech Republic) Jiří Barnat (Czech Republic) F Duda	6^{4}	3
(Spain) B Pujol Navarro (Japan) K Uchida	5	1
2	(Italy) M Bortolotti (Venezuela) LD Martínez	7	6

Quarterfinals
(Romania) A Jecan; I Liutarevich	4	4
(France) G Blancaneaux (United Kingdom) J Paris	6	6
4	(United States) P Trhac (Poland) S Walków	7^{8}	3	[12]
WC	(Germany) T Rühl (Germany) P Zahraj	6^{6}	6	[14]
(Switzerland) J Paul (Netherlands) D Pel	7^{8}	7
3	(United States) V Kirkov (Netherlands) M Veldheer	6^{6}	5
(Ukraine) D Molchanov (Czech Republic) M Vrbenský	4	6	[10]
2	(Italy) M Bortolotti (Venezuela) LD Martínez	6	3	[8]

Semifinals
(France) G Blancaneaux (United Kingdom) J Paris	7^{7}	6
WC	(Germany) T Rühl (Germany) P Zahraj	6^{5}	1
(Switzerland) J Paul (Netherlands) D Pel	6	6
(Ukraine) D Molchanov (Czech Republic) M Vrbenský	3	2

Final
(France) G Blancaneaux (United Kingdom) J Paris
(Switzerland) J Paul (Netherlands) D Pel	w/o
