= 2026 Koblenz Open – Doubles =

Doubles
- 2026 Koblenz Open

Final
- Champions: (Belgium) Tibo Colson (Netherlands) Thijmen Loof
- Runners-up: (Czech Republic) Filip Duda (Serbia) Stefan Latinović
- Score: 7–6^{(7–1)}, 3–6, [10–6]

Events
Singles	Doubles
- Koblenz Open

Jakub Paul and David Pel were the defending champions but chose not to defend their title.

Tibo Colson and Thijmen Loof won the title after defeating Filip Duda and Stefan Latinović 7–6^{(7–1)}, 3–6, [10–6] in the final.

== Seeds ==
1. (Peru) Alexander Merino / (Germany) Christoph Negritu (first round)
2. (Czech Republic) Filip Duda / (Serbia) Stefan Latinović (final)
3. (Germany) Tim Rühl / (Germany) Patrick Zahraj (semifinals)
4. (Belgium) Michael Geerts / (Germany) Daniel Masur (semifinals)

== Draw ==
Key

- Q = Qualifier
- WC = Wild card
- LL = Lucky loser
- Alt = Alternate
- ITF = ITF entry
- PR = Protected ranking
- SR = Special ranking
- SE = Special exempt
- JE = Junior exempt
- JR = Junior Accelerator Programme entrant
- CO = College Accelerator Programme entrant
- NG = Next Gen Accelerator Program entrant
- w/o = Walkover
- r = Retired
- d = Defaulted

First round
1	(Peru) A Merino (Germany) C Negritu	3	5
(Belgium) T Colson (Netherlands) T Loof	6	7
(Switzerland) J Nikles (Ukraine) Vadym Ursu	6^{3}	5
(Netherlands) M Hermans (Germany) K Wehnelt	7^{7}	7
3	(Germany) T Rühl (Germany) P Zahraj	3	6	[10]
(Czech Republic) J Jermář (United Kingdom) M Whitehouse	6	3	[8]
WC	(Germany) N McDonald (Germany) J Opitz	6	1	[10]
(France) Robin Catry (France) Loann Massard	4	6	[2]
(Belgium) B Gadamauri (Germany) John Sperle	6	6
WC	(Germany) Jonathan Dazert (Germany) Tristan Reiff	2	2
(Germany) Niklas Schell (Germany) M Wiskandt	5	7^{7}	[6]
4	(Belgium) M Geerts (Germany) D Masur	7	6^{5}	[10]
(Spain) A Barroso Campos (Spain) Ignasi Forcano	5	5
(Czech Republic) J Forejtek (Czech Republic) M Krumich	7	7
(Germany) R Molleker (Germany) H Squire	6^{3}	4
2	(Czech Republic) F Duda (Serbia) S Latinović	7^{7}	6

Quarterfinals
(Belgium) T Colson (Netherlands) T Loof	6	3	[10]
(Netherlands) M Hermans (Germany) K Wehnelt	3	6	[3]
3	(Germany) T Rühl (Germany) P Zahraj	2	6	[12]
WC	(Germany) N McDonald (Germany) J Opitz	6	4	[10]
(Belgium) B Gadamauri (Germany) J Sperle	6^{4}	4
4	(Belgium) M Geerts (Germany) D Masur	7^{7}	6
(Czech Republic) J Forejtek (Czech Republic) M Krumich
2	(Czech Republic) F Duda (Serbia) S Latinović	w/o

Semifinals
(Belgium) T Colson (Netherlands) T Loof	6	6
3	(Germany) T Rühl (Germany) P Zahraj	3	3
4	(Belgium) M Geerts (Germany) D Masur	6	3	[8]
2	(Czech Republic) F Duda (Serbia) S Latinović	2	6	[10]

Final
(Belgium) T Colson (Netherlands) T Loof	7^{7}	3	[10]
2	(Czech Republic) F Duda (Serbia) S Latinović	6^{1}	6	[6]
