= 2018 Koblenz Open =

- Date: 16–21 January
- Edition: 2nd
- Surface: Hard (indoor)
- Location: Koblenz, Germany

Champions

Singles
- (Germany) Mats Moraing

Doubles
- (Monaco) Romain Arneodo / (Austria) Tristan-Samuel Weissborn
← 2017 ·	Koblenz Open	· 2019 →

The 2018 Koblenz Open was a professional tennis tournament played on indoor hard courts. It was the second edition of the tournament which was part of the 2018 ATP Challenger Tour. It took place in Koblenz, Germany between 16 and 21 January 2018.

== Singles main-draw entrants ==
=== Seeds ===
Country	Player	Rank^{1}	Seed
RUS	Andrey Kuznetsov	104	1
ITA	Marco Cecchinato	106	2
UKR	Sergiy Stakhovsky	122	3
GER	Oscar Otte	133	4
GER	Yannick Maden	146	5
FRA	Kenny de Schepper	154	6
SVK	Andrej Martin	159	7
ESP	Tommy Robredo	163	8

- ^{1} Rankings are as of 8 January 2018.

=== Other entrants ===
The following players received wildcards into the singles main draw:

- (Germany) Jan Choinski
- (Germany) Benjamin Hassan
- (Germany) Marvin Möller
- (Germany) Mats Moraing

The following players received entry into the singles main draw as alternates:

- (Belarus) Ilya Ivashka
- (Spain) Tommy Robredo
- (Ukraine) Sergiy Stakhovsky

The following players received entry from the qualifying draw:

- (Belgium) Joris De Loore
- (Belgium) Christopher Heyman
- (Slovakia) Filip Horanský
- (Sweden) Mikael Ymer

== Champions ==
=== Singles ===
- (Germany) Mats Moraing def. (France) Kenny de Schepper 6–2, 6–1.

=== Doubles ===
- (Monaco) Romain Arneodo / (Austria) Tristan-Samuel Weissborn def. (Netherlands) Sander Arends / (Croatia) Antonio Šančić 6–7^{(4–7)}, 7–5, [10–6].
