= 2020 Koblenz Open – Singles =

Singles
- 2020 Koblenz Open

Final
- Champion: (Czech Republic) Tomáš Macháč
- Runner-up: (Netherlands) Botic van de Zandschulp
- Score: 6–3, 4–6, 6–3

Events
Singles	Doubles
- Koblenz Open

Gianluca Mager was the defending champion but chose not to defend his title.

Tomáš Macháč won the title after defeating Botic van de Zandschulp 6–3, 4–6, 6–3 in the final.

== Seeds ==
All seeds receive a bye into the second round.

1. (Germany) Yannick Maden (quarterfinals)
2. (Germany) Yannick Hanfmann (quarterfinals)
3. (Netherlands) Tallon Griekspoor (third round)
4. (Germany) Oscar Otte (second round)
5. (France) Maxime Janvier (second round)
6. (Netherlands) Botic van de Zandschulp (final)
7. (France) Quentin Halys (third round)
8. (Germany) Mats Moraing (second round)
9. (Germany) Julian Lenz (second round)
10. (Germany) Dustin Brown (third round)
11. (Spain) Nicola Kuhn (semifinals)
12. (Belgium) Ruben Bemelmans (semifinals)
13. (Germany) Daniel Masur (quarterfinals)
14. (Russia) Teymuraz Gabashvili (second round)
15. (Austria) Lucas Miedler (second round)
16. (Russia) Pavel Kotov (second round)

== Draw ==
Key

- Q = Qualifier
- WC = Wild card
- LL = Lucky loser
- Alt = Alternate
- ITF = ITF entry
- PR = Protected ranking
- SR = Special ranking
- SE = Special exempt
- JE = Junior exempt
- JR = Junior Accelerator Programme entrant
- CO = College Accelerator Programme entrant
- NG = Next Gen Accelerator Program entrant
- w/o = Walkover
- r = Retired
- d = Defaulted

=== Finals ===
Quarterfinals
1	(Germany) Yannick Maden	6	4	4
6	(Netherlands) Botic van de Zandschulp	4	6	6
13	(Germany) Daniel Masur	7	6^{2}	2
11	(Spain) Nicola Kuhn	5	7^{7}	6
(Bulgaria) Dimitar Kuzmanov	4	4
(Czech Republic) Tomáš Macháč	6	6
12	(Belgium) Ruben Bemelmans	6	6
2	(Germany) Yannick Hanfmann	3	2

Semifinals
6	(Netherlands) Botic van de Zandschulp	6	3	6
11	(Spain) Nicola Kuhn	4	6	2
(Czech Republic) Tomáš Macháč	6	6
12	(Belgium) Ruben Bemelmans	2	4

Final
6	(Netherlands) Botic van de Zandschulp	3	6	3
(Czech Republic) Tomáš Macháč	6	4	6

=== Top half ===
==== Section 1 ====
First round
WC	(Germany) L Wessels	6	6
(Germany) Peter Heller	3	2
LL	(Turkey) E Kırkın	4	6	6
(Germany) B Hassan	6	1	4
(Germany) M Marterer	6	7^{7}
(Colombia) E Struvay	3	6^{5}
(Poland) K Żuk	6	3	6^{4}
(Netherlands) I Sijsling	4	6	7^{7}

Second round
1	(Germany) Y Maden	3	7^{7}	6
WC	(Germany) L Wessels	6	6^{5}	3
LL	(Turkey) E Kırkın	6	6^{5}	7
16	(Russia) P Kotov	4	7^{7}	5
9	(Germany) J Lenz	1	3
(Germany) M Marterer	6	6
(Netherlands) I Sijsling
6	(Netherlands) B van de Zandschulp	w/o

Third round
1	(Germany) Y Maden	6	6
LL	(Turkey) E Kırkın	3	0
(Germany) M Marterer	4	2
6	(Netherlands) B van de Zandschulp	6	6

Quarterfinals
1	(Germany) Y Maden	6	4	4
6	(Netherlands) B van de Zandschulp	4	6	6

==== Section 2 ====
First round
(Italy) E Dalla Valle	1	4
Q	(Germany) Lucas Gerch	6	6
(Czech Republic) V Šafránek	6	6
(Belgium) Christopher Heyman	4	2
(Italy) A Bega	6	6
(Israel) E Leshem	1	2
(Bosnia and Herzegovina) M Bašić	6	6
(Belgium) Y Mertens	3	1

Second round
3	(Netherlands) T Griekspoor	6	2	7^{7}
Q	(Germany) L Gerch	4	6	6^{3}
(Czech Republic) V Šafránek	7	6^{2}	2
13	(Germany) D Masur	5	7^{7}	6
11	(Spain) N Kuhn	6	6
(Italy) A Bega	3	2
(Bosnia and Herzegovina) M Bašić	6	6
8	(Germany) M Moraing	4	4

Third round
3	(Netherlands) T Griekspoor	7	3	1
13	(Germany) D Masur	5	6	6
11	(Spain) N Kuhn	6	7^{7}
(Bosnia and Herzegovina) M Bašić	4	6^{4}

Quarterfinals
13	(Germany) D Masur	7	6^{2}	2
11	(Spain) N Kuhn	5	7^{7}	6

=== Bottom half ===
==== Section 3 ====
First round
(Bulgaria) D Kuzmanov	6	6
(Ukraine) V Orlov	2	1
(Belarus) U Ignatik	6	6
WC	(Germany) Nino Ehrenschneider	1	1
WC	(Germany) Leopold Zima	2	2
(Czech Republic) T Macháč	6	6
WC	(Czech Republic) M Gengel	4	3
(Czech Republic) V Kopřiva	6	6

Second round
5	(France) M Janvier	4	5
(Bulgaria) D Kuzmanov	6	7
(Belarus) U Ignatik	4	4
10	(Germany) D Brown	6	6
14	(Russia) T Gabashvili	0	3
(Czech Republic) T Macháč	6	6
(Czech Republic) V Kopřiva	6	7^{7}
4	(Germany) O Otte	4	6^{4}

Third round
(Bulgaria) D Kuzmanov	4	6	6
10	(Germany) D Brown	6	3	4
(Czech Republic) T Macháč	6	6
(Czech Republic) V Kopřiva	3	3

Quarterfinals
(Bulgaria) D Kuzmanov	4	4
(Czech Republic) T Macháč	6	6

==== Section 4 ====
First round
WC	(Germany) M Welte	6	4	6
(Czech Republic) A Pavlásek	1	6	4
(France) D Added	5	4
(Russia) A Dubrivnyy	7	6
Q	(India) S Mukund	6	6
(Romania) FC Jianu	3	2
(Sweden) M Eriksson	2	2
(Czech Republic) M Vrbenský	6	6

Second round
7	(France) Q Halys	7	6
WC	(Germany) M Welte	5	2
(Russia) A Dubrivnyy	3	1
12	(Belgium) R Bemelmans	6	6
15	(Austria) L Miedler	6^{1}	4
Q	(India) S Mukund	7^{7}	6
(Czech Republic) M Vrbenský	7^{9}	4	6^{5}
2	(Germany) Y Hanfmann	6^{7}	6	7^{7}

Third round
7	(France) Q Halys	2	4
12	(Belgium) R Bemelmans	6	6
Q	(India) S Mukund	5	4
2	(Germany) Y Hanfmann	7	6

Quarterfinals
12	(Belgium) R Bemelmans	6	6
2	(Germany) Y Hanfmann	3	2
