= 2019 Koblenz Open =

- Date: 14–20 January
- Edition: 3rd
- Surface: Hard (indoor)
- Location: Koblenz, Germany

Champions

Singles
- (Italy) Gianluca Mager

Doubles
- (Czech Republic) Zdeněk Kolář / (Czech Republic) Adam Pavlásek
| ← 2018 · | Koblenz Open | · 2020 → |

The 2019 Koblenz Open was a professional tennis tournament played on indoor hard courts. It was the third edition of the tournament which was part of the 2019 ATP Challenger Tour. It took place in Koblenz, Germany between 14 and 20 January 2019.

== Singles main-draw entrants ==
=== Seeds ===
| Country | Player | Rank^{1} | Seed |
|---|---|---|---|
| NOR | Casper Ruud | 111 | 1 |
| GER | Yannick Maden | 125 | 2 |
| RUS | Alexey Vatutin | 175 | 3 |
| ITA | Andrea Arnaboldi | 178 | 4 |
| GER | Daniel Brands | 183 | 5 |
| GBR | James Ward | 187 | 6 |
| SWE | Mikael Ymer | 196 | 7 |
| BEL | Arthur De Greef | 200 | 8 |
| CZE | Adam Pavlásek | 203 | 9 |
| GER | Tobias Kamke | 214 | 10 |
| SVK | Filip Horanský | 218 | 11 |
| FRA | Kenny de Schepper | 219 | 12 |
| CZE | Zdeněk Kolář | 220 | 13 |
| NED | Tallon Griekspoor | 234 | 14 |
| NED | Thiemo de Bakker | 243 | 15 |
| BLR | Uladzimir Ignatik | 256 | 16 |

- ^{1} Rankings are as of 7 January 2019.

=== Other entrants ===
The following players received wildcards into the singles main draw:

- (Czech Republic) Marek Gengel
- (Germany) Johannes Härteis
- (Germany) Benjamin Hassan
- (Germany) Kai Lemstra
- (Germany) Julian Lenz

The following player received entry into the singles main draw using a protected ranking:

- (Poland) Michał Przysiężny

The following players received entry into the singles main draw using their ITF World Tennis Ranking:

- (Spain) Javier Barranco Cosano
- (Italy) Raúl Brancaccio
- (Germany) Peter Heller
- (Russia) Roman Safiullin

The following players received entry from the qualifying draw:

- (Germany) Peter Torebko
- (Germany) Louis Wessels

The following players received entry as lucky losers:

- (Italy) Riccardo Bonadio
- (Germany) Bastien Presuhn

== Champions ==
=== Singles ===
- (Italy) Gianluca Mager def. (Spain) Roberto Ortega Olmedo 2–6, 7–6^{(8–6)}, 6–2.

=== Doubles ===
- (Czech Republic) Zdeněk Kolář / (Czech Republic) Adam Pavlásek def. (Austria) Jürgen Melzer / (Slovakia) Filip Polášek 6–3, 6–4.
