= 2025 Koblenz Open – Singles =

Singles
- 2025 Koblenz Open

Final
- Champion: (France) Ugo Blanchet
- Runner-up: (Italy) Luca Nardi
- Score: 6–3, 3–6, 7–6^{(7–5)}

Events
Singles	Doubles
- Koblenz Open

Jurij Rodionov was the defending champion but chose not to defend his title.

Ugo Blanchet won the title after defeating Luca Nardi 6–3, 3–6, 7–6^{(7–5)} in the final.

== Seeds ==
1. (Germany) Henri Squire (quarterfinals)
2. (Netherlands) Gijs Brouwer (withdrew)
3. (France) Antoine Escoffier (first round)
4. (France) Matteo Martineau (quarterfinals)
5. (France) Ugo Blanchet (champion)
6. (Italy) Gianluca Mager (first round)
7. (Italy) Federico Arnaboldi (first round)
8. (Italy) Francesco Maestrelli (withdrew)

== Draw ==
Key

- Q = Qualifier
- WC = Wild card
- LL = Lucky loser
- Alt = Alternate
- ITF = ITF entry
- PR = Protected ranking
- SR = Special ranking
- SE = Special exempt
- JE = Junior exempt
- JR = Junior Accelerator Programme entrant
- CO = College Accelerator Programme entrant
- NG = Next Gen Accelerator Program entrant
- w/o = Walkover
- r = Retired
- d = Defaulted

=== Finals ===
Semifinals
(Italy) Giulio Zeppieri	4	6^{4}
Q	(Italy) Luca Nardi	6	7^{7}
5	(France) Ugo Blanchet	7^{8}	6
LL	(Switzerland) Jakub Paul	6^{6}	4

Final
Q	(Italy) Luca Nardi	3	6	6^{5}
5	(France) Ugo Blanchet	6	3	7^{7}

=== Top half ===
First round
1	(Germany) H Squire	3	6	6
LL	(Bulgaria) D Kuzmanov	6	4	3
Q	(Germany) M Wiskandt	6^{5}	4
(Jordan) A Shelbayh	7^{7}	6
Q	(Ukraine) Vadym Ursu	6^{5}	3
(France) Mathys Erhard	7^{7}	6
(Italy) G Zeppieri	6	6
7	(Italy) F Arnaboldi	4	2
3	(France) A Escoffier	1	6	3
(France) G Blancaneaux	6	3	6
(Netherlands) J Sels	3	4
Q	(Italy) L Nardi	6	6
WC	(Germany) J Engel	2	2
Q	(Switzerland) M Brunold	6	6
Q	(Germany) C Negritu	4	6	7
LL	(Netherlands) Ryan Nijboer	6	2	5

Second round
1	(Germany) H Squire	6	6
(Jordan) A Shelbayh	3	2
(France) M Erhard	3	6	3
(Italy) G Zeppieri	6	1	6
(France) G Blancaneaux	2	2
Q	(Italy) L Nardi	6	6
Q	(Switzerland) M Brunold	6	6
Q	(Germany) C Negritu	2	4

Quarterfinals
1	(Germany) H Squire	6	6^{7}	3
(Italy) G Zeppieri	4	7^{9}	6
Q	(Italy) L Nardi	6	7
Q	(Switzerland) M Brunold	4	5

Semifinals
(Italy) G Zeppieri	4	6^{4}
Q	(Italy) L Nardi	6	7^{7}

=== Bottom half ===
First round
5	(France) U Blanchet	4	6	6
(Belgium) M Geerts	6	1	4
(Germany) MH Rehberg	6	6
Alt	(Ukraine) O Prihodko	4	4
WC	(Germany) D Dedura-Palomero	6^{7}	1
Q	(Germany) F Broska	7^{9}	6
(Spain) B Zapata Miralles	2	6^{5}
4	(France) M Martineau	6	7^{7}
6	(Italy) G Mager	4	2
Alt	A Vatutin	6	6
Alt	I Gakhov	6	3	6
WC	(Germany) M Schönhaus	2	6	3
(Italy) Samuel Vincent Ruggeri	4	1
(Germany) D Masur	6	6
(Germany) R Molleker	4	6^{2}
LL	(Switzerland) J Paul	6	7^{7}

Second round
5	(France) U Blanchet	2	7^{7}	7^{7}
(Germany) MH Rehberg	6	6^{5}	6^{4}
Q	(Germany) F Broska	4	7	4
4	(France) M Martineau	6	5	6
Alt	A Vatutin	4	6	6
Alt	I Gakhov	6	2	4
(Germany) D Masur	6^{4}	5
LL	(Switzerland) J Paul	7^{7}	7

Quarterfinals
5	(France) U Blanchet	7^{7}	3	7^{7}
4	(France) M Martineau	6^{3}	6	6^{1}
Alt	A Vatutin	3	6	3
LL	(Switzerland) J Paul	6	2	6

Semifinals
5	(France) U Blanchet	7^{8}	6
LL	(Switzerland) J Paul	6^{6}	4
