= 2024 Koblenz Open – Doubles =

Doubles
- 2024 Koblenz Open

Final
- Champions: (Netherlands) Sander Arends (Netherlands) Sem Verbeek
- Runners-up: (Germany) Jakob Schnaitter (Germany) Mark Wallner
- Score: 6–4, 6–2

Events
Singles	Doubles
- Koblenz Open

Fabian Fallert and Hendrik Jebens were the defending champions but chose not to defend their title.

Sander Arends and Sem Verbeek won the title after defeating Jakob Schnaitter and Mark Wallner 6–4, 6–2 in the final.

== Seeds ==
1. (India) Arjun Kadhe / (India) Jeevan Nedunchezhiyan (withdrew)
2. Ivan Liutarevich / (Ukraine) Vladyslav Manafov (quarterfinals)
3. (Netherlands) Sander Arends / (Netherlands) Sem Verbeek (champions)
4. (Spain) Sergio Martos Gornés / (Spain) David Vega Hernández (semifinals)
5. (South Africa) Lloyd Harris / (Switzerland) Luca Margaroli (quarterfinals, withdrew)

== Draw ==
Key

- Q = Qualifier
- WC = Wild card
- LL = Lucky loser
- Alt = Alternate
- ITF = ITF entry
- PR = Protected ranking
- SR = Special ranking
- SE = Special exempt
- JE = Junior exempt
- JR = Junior Accelerator Programme entrant
- CO = College Accelerator Programme entrant
- NG = Next Gen Accelerator Program entrant
- w/o = Walkover
- r = Retired
- d = Defaulted

First round
5	(South Africa) L Harris (Switzerland) L Margaroli	7^{7}	6
(Serbia) I Sabanov (Serbia) M Sabanov	6^{2}	1
WC	(Germany) J Schnaitter (Germany) M Wallner	6	5	[10]
(Italy) M Bellucci (Italy) S Travaglia	0	7	[5]
4	(Spain) S Martos Gornés (Spain) D Vega Hernández	6	6
(Germany) A Begemann (Romania) A Jecan	4	4
(United Kingdom) B Harris (United Kingdom) R Peniston	5	6	[10]
(Netherlands) M Veldheer (Germany) K Wehnelt	7	3	[5]
(Poland) P Matuszewski (Poland) S Walków	7^{7}	6^{5}	[10]
Alt	(Spain) D Jordà Sanchis (Spain) A Moro Cañas	6^{3}	7^{7}	[8]
(United Kingdom) J Choinski (Czech Republic) Z Kolář	1	1
3	(Netherlands) S Arends (Netherlands) S Verbeek	6	6
(United States) C Harrison (United Kingdom) M Willis	6	7^{7}
WC	(Slovakia) M Kližan (United Kingdom) F Mischker	3	6^{4}
(Italy) R Brancaccio (Italy) F Passaro	3	4
2	I Liutarevich (Ukraine) V Manafov	6	6

Quarterfinals
5	(South Africa) L Harris (Switzerland) L Margaroli
WC	(Germany) J Schnaitter (Germany) M Wallner	w/o
4	(Spain) S Martos Gornés (Spain) D Vega Hernández	2	7^{7}	[10]
(United Kingdom) B Harris (United Kingdom) R Peniston	6	6^{5}	[7]
(Poland) P Matuszewski (Poland) S Walków	4	3
3	(Netherlands) S Arends (Netherlands) S Verbeek	6	6
(United States) C Harrison (United Kingdom) M Willis	6	6
2	I Liutarevich (Ukraine) V Manafov	1	4

Semifinals
WC	(Germany) J Schnaitter (Germany) M Wallner	6	7
4	(Spain) S Martos Gornés (Spain) D Vega Hernández	3	5
3	(Netherlands) S Arends (Netherlands) S Verbeek	7^{7}	7^{7}
(United States) C Harrison (United Kingdom) M Willis	6^{0}	6^{4}

Final
WC	(Germany) J Schnaitter (Germany) M Wallner	4	2
3	(Netherlands) S Arends (Netherlands) S Verbeek	6	6
