= 2023 Koblenz Open – Doubles =

Doubles
- 2023 Koblenz Open

Final
- Champions: (Germany) Fabian Fallert (Germany) Hendrik Jebens
- Runners-up: (France) Jonathan Eysseric (Ukraine) Denys Molchanov
- Score: 7–6^{(7–2)}, 6–3

Events
Singles	Doubles
- Koblenz Open

Sander Arends and David Pel were the defending champions but chose not to defend their title.

Fabian Fallert and Hendrik Jebens won the title after defeating Jonathan Eysseric and Denys Molchanov 7–6^{(7–2)}, 6–3 in the final.

== Seeds ==
1. (France) Albano Olivetti / (United States) Hunter Reese (semifinals)
2. (Austria) Philipp Oswald / (Poland) Szymon Walków (quarterfinals)
3. (India) Sriram Balaji / (India) Jeevan Nedunchezhiyan (first round)
4. (France) Jonathan Eysseric / (Ukraine) Denys Molchanov (final)

== Draw ==
Key

- Q = Qualifier
- WC = Wild card
- LL = Lucky loser
- Alt = Alternate
- ITF = ITF entry
- PR = Protected ranking
- SR = Special ranking
- SE = Special exempt
- JE = Junior exempt
- JR = Junior Accelerator Programme entrant
- CO = College Accelerator Programme entrant
- NG = Next Gen Accelerator Program entrant
- w/o = Walkover
- r = Retired
- d = Defaulted

First round
1	(France) A Olivetti (United States) H Reese	6	7^{7}
WC	(Germany) F Broska (Germany) Felix Einig	3	6^{4}
(Germany) Niklas Schell (Germany) K Wehnelt	6	3	[5]
(Czech Republic) Z Kolář (Ukraine) V Sachko	4	6	[10]
4	(France) J Eysseric (Ukraine) D Molchanov	7	6
PR	(Netherlands) T de Bakker (Netherlands) B Stevens	5	2
(United Kingdom) L Broady (Jamaica) D Brown	3	6	[8]
WC	(Germany) C Frantzen (Germany) T Sandkaulen	6	2	[10]
(India) A Chandrasekar (India) VS Prashanth	2	6	[10]
(Czech Republic) R Jebavý (Czech Republic) P Nouza	6	3	[7]
(Germany) F Fallert (Germany) H Jebens	1	7^{7}	[10]
3	(India) S Balaji (India) J Nedunchezhiyan	6	6^{2}	[7]
(Netherlands) R Haase (China) Zh Zhang	2	6	[10]
(India) A Kadhe (Germany) D Masur	6	4	[8]
(Netherlands) G Brouwer (India) S Myneni	0	5
2	(Austria) P Oswald (Poland) S Walków	6	7

Quarterfinals
1	(France) A Olivetti (United States) H Reese	7^{7}	2	[13]
(Czech Republic) Z Kolář (Ukraine) V Sachko	6^{3}	6	[11]
4	(France) J Eysseric (Ukraine) D Molchanov	6	0	[10]
WC	(Germany) C Frantzen (Germany) T Sandkaulen	3	6	[8]
(India) A Chandrasekar (India) VS Prashanth	1	1
(Germany) F Fallert (Germany) H Jebens	6	6
(Netherlands) R Haase (China) Zh Zhang	4	6	[10]
2	(Austria) P Oswald (Poland) S Walków	6	4	[7]

Semifinals
1	(France) A Olivetti (United States) H Reese	5	1
4	(France) J Eysseric (Ukraine) D Molchanov	7	6
(Germany) F Fallert (Germany) H Jebens	6	6
(Netherlands) R Haase (China) Zh Zhang	2	4

Final
4	(France) J Eysseric (Ukraine) D Molchanov	6^{2}	3
(Germany) F Fallert (Germany) H Jebens	7^{7}	6
