= 2026 Koblenz Open =

- Date: 2 – 8 February
- Edition: 8th
- Surface: Hard (indoor)
- Location: Koblenz, Germany

Champions

Singles
- Pavel Kotov

Doubles
- (Belgium) Tibo Colson / (Netherlands) Thijmen Loof
- Koblenz Open

The 2026 Koblenz Open was a professional tennis tournament played on indoor hardcourts. It was the eighth edition of the tournament which was part of the 2026 ATP Challenger Tour. It took place in Koblenz, Germany from 2 to 8 February 2026.

== Singles main-draw entrants ==
=== Seeds ===
Country	Player	Rank^{1}	Seed
CZE	Zdeněk Kolář	176	1
FRA	Dan Added	201	2
GBR	Johannus Monday	216	3
JPN	Kaichi Uchida	248	4
GER	Henri Squire	276	5
GER	Patrick Zahraj	280	6
GER	Tom Gentzsch	283	7
BEL	Michael Geerts	293	8

- ^{1} Rankings are as of 19 January 2026.

=== Other entrants ===
The following players received wildcards into the singles main draw:

- (Germany) Diego Dedura
- (Germany) Niels McDonald
- (Germany) Max Schönhaus

The following player received entry into the singles main draw through the Next Gen Accelerator programme:

- (France) Maé Malige

The following players received entry from the qualifying draw:

- (Czech Republic) Matthew William Donald
- (Belgium) Buvaysar Gadamauri
- (Germany) Liam Gavrielides
- (Switzerland) Johan Nikles
- (Germany) Mika Petkovic
- (Germany) Max Hans Rehberg

== Champions ==
=== Singles ===
- Pavel Kotov def. (Germany) Tom Gentzsch 6–4, 1–6, 7–6^{(10–8)}.

=== Doubles ===
- (Belgium) Tibo Colson / (Netherlands) Thijmen Loof def. (Czech Republic) Filip Duda / (Serbia) Stefan Latinović 7–6^{(7–1)}, 3–6, [10–6].
