= 2024 Koblenz Open =

- Date: 29 January – 4 February
- Edition: 6th
- Surface: Hard (indoor)
- Location: Koblenz, Germany

Champions

Singles
- (Austria) Jurij Rodionov

Doubles
- (Netherlands) Sander Arends / (Netherlands) Sem Verbeek
- Koblenz Open

The 2024 Koblenz Open was a professional tennis tournament played on indoor hard courts. It was the sixth edition of the tournament which was part of the 2024 ATP Challenger Tour. It took place in Koblenz, Germany from 29 January to 4 February 2024.

== Singles main-draw entrants ==
=== Seeds ===
Country	Player	Rank^{1}	Seed
AUT	Jurij Rodionov	111	1
USA	Brandon Nakashima	127	2
~~GBR~~	~~Jan Choinski~~	~~162~~	~~3~~
RSA	Lloyd Harris	167	4
CZE	Zdeněk Kolář	176	5
ITA	Mattia Bellucci	179	6
GER	Rudolf Molleker	192	7
~~ITA~~	~~Francesco Passaro~~	~~194~~	~~8~~

- ^{1} Rankings are as of 15 January 2024.

=== Other entrants ===
The following players received wildcards into the singles main draw:

- (Germany) Tom Gentzsch
- (Germany) Max Hans Rehberg
- (Germany) Henri Squire

The following player received entry into the singles main draw as an alternate:

- (Germany) Oscar Otte

The following players received entry from the qualifying draw:

- (United Kingdom) Charles Broom
- (Slovakia) Martin Kližan
- (Serbia) Filip Krajinović
- (France) Tristan Lamasine
- (Poland) Daniel Michalski
- (Syria) Hazem Naw

The following players received entry as lucky losers:

- (Italy) Franco Agamenone
- (Spain) David Jordà Sanchis

== Champions ==
=== Singles ===
- (Austria) Jurij Rodionov def. (United States) Brandon Nakashima 6–7^{(7–9)}, 6–1, 6–2.

=== Doubles ===
- (Netherlands) Sander Arends / (Netherlands) Sem Verbeek def. (Germany) Jakob Schnaitter / (Germany) Mark Wallner 6–4, 6–2.
