= 2019 Koblenz Open – Doubles =

Doubles
- 2019 Koblenz Open

Final
- Champions: (Czech Republic) Zdeněk Kolář (Czech Republic) Adam Pavlásek
- Runners-up: (Austria) Jürgen Melzer (Slovakia) Filip Polášek
- Score: 6–3, 6–4

Events
Singles	Doubles
- Koblenz Open

Romain Arneodo and Tristan-Samuel Weissborn were the defending champions but only Weissborn chose to defend his title, partnering Sander Arends. Weissborn lost in the first round to Jürgen Melzer and Filip Polášek.

Zdeněk Kolář and Adam Pavlásek won the title after defeating Melzer and Polášek 6–3, 6–4 in the final.

== Seeds ==
1. (Netherlands) Sander Arends / (Austria) Tristan-Samuel Weissborn (first round)
2. (Germany) Andre Begemann / (Australia) Rameez Junaid (first round)
3. (Brazil) Fabrício Neis / (India) Purav Raja (semifinals)
4. (Portugal) Gonçalo Oliveira / (Netherlands) David Pel (first round)

== Draw ==
Key

- Q = Qualifier
- WC = Wild card
- LL = Lucky loser
- Alt = Alternate
- ITF = ITF entry
- PR = Protected ranking
- SR = Special ranking
- SE = Special exempt
- JE = Junior exempt
- JR = Junior Accelerator Programme entrant
- CO = College Accelerator Programme entrant
- NG = Next Gen Accelerator Program entrant
- w/o = Walkover
- r = Retired
- d = Defaulted

First round
1	(Netherlands) S Arends (Austria) T-S Weissborn	3	4
(Austria) J Melzer (Slovakia) F Polášek	6	6
ITF	(Spain) J Barranco Cosano (Italy) R Brancaccio	7^{7}	6^{4}	[10]
(United Kingdom) S Clayton (Canada) A Shamasdin	6^{4}	7^{7}	[12]
3	(Brazil) F Neis (India) P Raja	7^{7}	4	[10]
(Switzerland) L Margaroli (Spain) D Vega Hernández	6^{2}	6	[5]
Alt	(Netherlands) T de Bakker (Netherlands) M Vervoort	7	7^{7}
WC	(Germany) B Hassan (Germany) J Lenz	5	6^{4}
ITF	(Germany) Peter Heller (Germany) P Torebko	6	3	[10]
(Belgium) A De Greef (Netherlands) T Griekspoor	4	6	[6]
(Russia) E Karlovskiy (Kazakhstan) T Khabibulin	2	6	[10]
4	(Portugal) G Oliveira (Netherlands) D Pel	6	3	[7]
(Russia) A Pavlioutchenkov (Poland) S Walków	3	6^{6}
WC	(Czech Republic) M Gengel (Germany) J Härteis	6	7^{8}
(Czech Republic) Z Kolář (Czech Republic) A Pavlásek	6	6
2	(Germany) A Begemann (Australia) R Junaid	2	4

Quarterfinals
(Austria) J Melzer (Slovakia) F Polášek	6	6
(United Kingdom) S Clayton (Canada) A Shamasdin	2	2
3	(Brazil) F Neis (India) P Raja	6	6
Alt	(Netherlands) T de Bakker (Netherlands) M Vervoort	4	2
ITF	(Germany) P Heller (Germany) P Torebko	1	4
(Russia) E Karlovskiy (Kazakhstan) T Khabibulin	6	6
WC	(Czech Republic) M Gengel (Germany) J Härteis	4	6	[7]
(Czech Republic) Z Kolář (Czech Republic) A Pavlásek	6	3	[10]

Semifinals
(Austria) J Melzer (Slovakia) F Polášek	6	6
3	(Brazil) F Neis (India) P Raja	4	4
(Russia) E Karlovskiy (Kazakhstan) T Khabibulin	5	2
(Czech Republic) Z Kolář (Czech Republic) A Pavlásek	7	6

Final
(Austria) J Melzer (Slovakia) F Polášek	3	4
(Czech Republic) Z Kolář (Czech Republic) A Pavlásek	6	6
