= 2025 Koblenz Open =

- Date: 27 January – 2 February
- Edition: 7th
- Surface: Hard (indoor)
- Location: Koblenz, Germany

Champions

Singles
- (France) Ugo Blanchet

Doubles
- (Switzerland) Jakub Paul / (Netherlands) David Pel
- Koblenz Open

The 2025 Koblenz Open was a professional tennis tournament played on indoor hardcourts. It was the seventh edition of the tournament which was part of the 2025 ATP Challenger Tour. It took place in Koblenz, Germany from 27 January to 2 February 2025.

== Singles main-draw entrants ==
=== Seeds ===
Country	Player	Rank^{1}	Seed
GER	Henri Squire	178	1
~~NED~~	~~Gijs Brouwer~~	~~189~~	~~2~~
FRA	Antoine Escoffier	205	3
FRA	Matteo Martineau	215	4
FRA	Ugo Blanchet	227	5
ITA	Gianluca Mager	228	6
ITA	Federico Arnaboldi	233	7
~~ITA~~	~~Francesco Maestrelli~~	~~237~~	~~8~~

- ^{1} Rankings are as of 13 January 2025.

=== Other entrants ===
The following players received wildcards into the singles main draw:

- (Germany) Diego Dedura-Palomero
- (Germany) Justin Engel
- (Germany) Max Schönhaus

The following players received entry into the singles main draw as alternates:

- Ivan Gakhov
- (Ukraine) Oleg Prihodko
- Alexey Vatutin

The following players received entry from the qualifying draw:

- (Germany) Florian Broska
- (Switzerland) Mika Brunold
- (Italy) Luca Nardi
- (Germany) Christoph Negritu
- (Ukraine) Vadym Ursu
- (Germany) Max Wiskandt

The following players received entry as lucky losers:

- (Bulgaria) Dimitar Kuzmanov
- (Netherlands) Ryan Nijboer
- (Switzerland) Jakub Paul

== Champions ==
=== Singles ===
- (France) Ugo Blanchet def. (Italy) Luca Nardi 6–3, 3–6, 7–6^{(7–5)}.

=== Doubles ===
- (Switzerland) Jakub Paul / (Netherlands) David Pel def. (France) Geoffrey Blancaneaux / (United Kingdom) Joshua Paris via walkover.
