= 2017 Koblenz Open – Doubles =

Doubles
- 2017 Koblenz Open

Final
- Champions: (Chile) Hans Podlipnik (Belarus) Andrei Vasilevski
- Runners-up: (Czech Republic) Roman Jebavý (Czech Republic) Lukáš Rosol
- Score: 7–5, 3–6, [16–14]

Events
Singles	Doubles
- Koblenz Open

This was the first edition of the tournament.

Hans Podlipnik and Andrei Vasilevski won the title after defeating Roman Jebavý and Lukáš Rosol 7–5, 3–6, [16–14] in the final.

== Seeds ==
1. (Peru) Sergio Galdós / (Brazil) Fabrício Neis (first round)
2. (Chile) Hans Podlipnik / (Belarus) Andrei Vasilevski (champions)
3. (Austria) Julian Knowle / (Germany) Kevin Krawietz (first round)
4. (Thailand) Sanchai Ratiwatana / (Thailand) Sonchat Ratiwatana (quarterfinals)

== Draw ==
Key

- Q = Qualifier
- WC = Wild card
- LL = Lucky loser
- Alt = Alternate
- ITF = ITF entry
- PR = Protected ranking
- SR = Special ranking
- SE = Special exempt
- JE = Junior exempt
- JR = Junior Accelerator Programme entrant
- CO = College Accelerator Programme entrant
- NG = Next Gen Accelerator Program entrant
- w/o = Walkover
- r = Retired
- d = Defaulted

First round
1	(Peru) S Galdós (Brazil) F Neis	2	2
(Uruguay) A Behar (Kazakhstan) A Golubev	6	6
(Czech Republic) R Jebavý (Czech Republic) L Rosol	6	6
WC	(Germany) F Broska (United Kingdom) Dylan Gee	2	1
3	(Austria) J Knowle (Germany) K Krawietz	6	3	[5]
(Croatia) D Marcan (Austria) T-S Weissborn	3	6	[10]
(Germany) G Kretschmer (Slovakia) I Zelenay	3	2
(Poland) T Bednarek (Croatia) A Šančić	6	6
(Romania) M Copil (Croatia) F Škugor	6	5	[8]
(Russia) T Gabashvili (Italy) A Motti	2	7	[10]
(Republic of Ireland) D O'Hare (Chinese Taipei) H-y Peng	7^{8}	3	[8]
4	(Thailand) Sa Ratiwatana (Thailand) So Ratiwatana	6^{6}	6	[10]
WC	(Germany) J Choinski (Germany) B Hassan	6^{5}	3
WC	(Australia) R Junaid (Germany) A Mies	7^{7}	6
(El Salvador) M Arévalo (Argentina) M Trungelliti	2	5
2	(Chile) H Podlipnik (Belarus) A Vasilevski	6	7

Quarterfinals
(Uruguay) A Behar (Kazakhstan) A Golubev	6	3	[11]
(Czech Republic) R Jebavý (Czech Republic) L Rosol	4	6	[13]
(Croatia) D Marcan (Austria) T-S Weissborn	6	6
(Poland) T Bednarek (Croatia) A Šančić	3	3
(Russia) T Gabashvili (Italy) A Motti	6	6
4	(Thailand) Sa Ratiwatana (Thailand) So Ratiwatana	4	1
WC	(Australia) R Junaid (Germany) A Mies	2	6^{4}
2	(Chile) H Podlipnik (Belarus) A Vasilevski	6	7^{7}

Semifinals
(Czech Republic) R Jebavý (Czech Republic) L Rosol	6	6
(Croatia) D Marcan (Austria) T-S Weissborn	3	3
(Russia) T Gabashvili (Italy) A Motti	3	6	[7]
2	(Chile) H Podlipnik (Belarus) A Vasilevski	6	3	[10]

Final
(Czech Republic) R Jebavý (Czech Republic) L Rosol	5	6	[14]
2	(Chile) H Podlipnik (Belarus) A Vasilevski	7	3	[16]
