= 2024 Koblenz Open – Singles =

Singles
- 2024 Koblenz Open

Final
- Champion: (Austria) Jurij Rodionov
- Runner-up: (United States) Brandon Nakashima
- Score: 6–7^{(7–9)}, 6–1, 6–2

Events
Singles	Doubles
- Koblenz Open

Roman Safiullin was the defending champion but chose not to defend his title.

Jurij Rodionov won the title after defeating Brandon Nakashima 6–7^{(7–9)}, 6–1, 6–2 in the final.

== Seeds ==
1. (Austria) Jurij Rodionov (champion)
2. (United States) Brandon Nakashima (final)
3. (United Kingdom) Jan Choinski (withdrew)
4. (South Africa) Lloyd Harris (first round)
5. (Czech Republic) Zdeněk Kolář (quarterfinals)
6. (Italy) Mattia Bellucci (first round)
7. (Germany) Rudolf Molleker (quarterfinals)
8. (Italy) Francesco Passaro (withdrew)

== Draw ==
Key

- Q = Qualifier
- WC = Wild card
- LL = Lucky loser
- Alt = Alternate
- ITF = ITF entry
- PR = Protected ranking
- SR = Special ranking
- SE = Special exempt
- JE = Junior exempt
- JR = Junior Accelerator Programme entrant
- CO = College Accelerator Programme entrant
- NG = Next Gen Accelerator Program entrant
- w/o = Walkover
- r = Retired
- d = Defaulted

=== Finals ===
Semifinals
1	(Austria) Jurij Rodionov	6	6
(Italy) Stefano Travaglia	3	4
Q	(Syria) Hazem Naw	3	5
2	(United States) Brandon Nakashima	6	7

Final
1	(Austria) Jurij Rodionov	6^{7}	6	6
2	(United States) Brandon Nakashima	7^{9}	1	2

=== Top half ===
First round
1	(Austria) J Rodionov	6	6
(Austria) D Novak	1	1
(France) V Royer	6^{3}	6	6
Q	(Poland) D Michalski	7^{7}	4	2
(Belgium) A Blockx	3	6	7^{7}
(France) G Mpetshi Perricard	6	3	6^{3}
Q	(Slovakia) M Kližan	0	2
7	(Germany) R Molleker	6	6
LL	(Italy) F Agamenone	4	5
(Italy) S Travaglia	6	7
WC	(Germany) H Squire	4	4
(France) Jules Marie	6	6
(France) M Janvier	4	1
(Kazakhstan) M Kukushkin	6	6
(United States) M Damm	6	6
6	(Italy) M Bellucci	3	3

Second round
1	(Austria) J Rodionov	7^{7}	6
(France) V Royer	6^{4}	1
(Belgium) A Blockx	3	0
7	(Germany) R Molleker	6	6
(Italy) S Travaglia	6	6
(France) J Marie	1	1
(Kazakhstan) M Kukushkin	6^{1}	7	6^{3}
(United States) M Damm	7^{7}	5	7^{7}

Quarterfinals
1	(Austria) J Rodionov	6	7
7	(Germany) R Molleker	3	5
(Italy) S Travaglia	3	6	7^{9}
(United States) M Damm	6	3	6^{7}

Semifinals
1	(Austria) J Rodionov	6	6
(Italy) S Travaglia	3	4

=== Bottom half ===
First round
5	(Czech Republic) Z Kolář	6	6
Q	(United Kingdom) C Broom	4	2
WC	(Germany) T Gentzsch	0	2
Q	(France) T Lamasine	6	6
(United Kingdom) B Harris	5	5
Q	(Syria) H Naw	7	7
Alt	(Germany) O Otte	5	6	6
4	(South Africa) L Harris	7	1	4
LL	(Spain) D Jordà Sanchis	6	3	6
(Ukraine) I Marchenko	4	6	1
(Italy) R Brancaccio	7^{9}	1	2
WC	(Germany) MH Rehberg	6^{7}	6	6
(United Kingdom) R Peniston	3	6	4
Q	(Serbia) F Krajinović	6	4	6
(Spain) A Moro Cañas	1	2
2	(United States) B Nakashima	6	6

Second round
5	(Czech Republic) Z Kolář	6	7^{7}
Q	(France) T Lamasine	3	6^{3}
Q	(Syria) H Naw	2	7^{7}	6
Alt	(Germany) O Otte	6	6^{3}	4
LL	(Spain) D Jordà Sanchis	6^{6}	4
WC	(Germany) MH Rehberg	7^{8}	6
Q	(Serbia) F Krajinović	6^{5}	4
2	(United States) B Nakashima	7^{7}	6

Quarterfinals
5	(Czech Republic) Z Kolář	2	4
Q	(Syria) H Naw	6	6
WC	(Germany) MH Rehberg	3	4
2	(United States) B Nakashima	6	6

Semifinals
Q	(Syria) H Naw	3	5
2	(United States) B Nakashima	6	7
