= 2017 Koblenz Open – Singles =

Singles
- 2017 Koblenz Open

Final
- Champion: (Belgium) Ruben Bemelmans
- Runner-up: (Germany) Nils Langer
- Score: 6–4, 3–6, 7–6^{(7–0)}

Events
Singles	Doubles
- Koblenz Open

This was the first edition of the tournament.

Ruben Bemelmans won the title after defeating Nils Langer 6–4, 3–6, 7–6^{(7–0)} in the final.

== Seeds ==
1. (Czech Republic) Lukáš Rosol (second round)
2. (Argentina) Guido Andreozzi (second round)
3. (Germany) Benjamin Becker (withdrew)
4. (Italy) Alessandro Giannessi (second round)
5. (Romania) Marius Copil (first round)
6. (Russia) Teymuraz Gabashvili (second round)
7. (Argentina) Marco Trungelliti (first round)
8. (Slovenia) Grega Žemlja (first round)

== Draw ==
Key

- Q = Qualifier
- WC = Wild card
- LL = Lucky loser
- Alt = Alternate
- ITF = ITF entry
- PR = Protected ranking
- SR = Special ranking
- SE = Special exempt
- JE = Junior exempt
- JR = Junior Accelerator Programme entrant
- CO = College Accelerator Programme entrant
- NG = Next Gen Accelerator Program entrant
- w/o = Walkover
- r = Retired
- d = Defaulted

=== Finals ===
Semifinals
(Germany) Jeremy Jahn	1	1
(Belgium) Ruben Bemelmans	6	6
Q	(Germany) Nils Langer	6	6
WC	(Germany) Daniel Masur	1	3

Final
(Belgium) Ruben Bemelmans	6	3	7^{7}
Q	(Germany) Nils Langer	4	6	6^{0}

=== Top half ===
First round
1	(Czech Republic) L Rosol	4	6	6
(Serbia) L Đere	6	2	4
(Serbia) F Krajinović	4	6	6
LL	(Romania) A Ungur	6	3	4
WC	(Germany) F Broska	1	3
(Germany) Jeremy Jahn	6	6
Q	(Poland) M Przysiężny	6	6
5	(Romania) M Copil	4	3
Q	(Switzerland) Y Marti	6	7^{7}
(Germany) M Marterer	2	6^{1}
Q	(Slovakia) F Horanský	5	5
(France) K de Schepper	7	7
Alt	(France) G Barrère	6	2	6
(Italy) F Gaio	4	6	2
(Belgium) R Bemelmans	6	6
7	(Argentina) M Trungelliti	4	2

Second round
1	(Czech Republic) L Rosol	6^{5}	5
(Serbia) F Krajinović	7^{7}	7
(Germany) J Jahn	6	6
Q	(Poland) M Przysiężny	4	3
Q	(Switzerland) Y Marti	7^{11}	2	4
(France) K de Schepper	6^{9}	6	6
Alt	(France) G Barrère	2	2
(Belgium) R Bemelmans	6	6

Quarterfinals
(Serbia) F Krajinović	6^{4}	3^{r}
(Germany) J Jahn	7^{7}	2
(France) K de Schepper	4	4
(Belgium) R Bemelmans	6	6

Semifinals
(Germany) J Jahn	1	1
(Belgium) R Bemelmans	6	6

=== Bottom half ===
First round
6	(Russia) T Gabashvili	4	6	6
WC	(Germany) B Hassan	6	3	1
WC	(Germany) J Choinski	3	5
(Germany) D Brands	6	7
(Belgium) Y Reuter	1	3
Q	(Germany) N Langer	6	6
(Croatia) F Škugor	4	6^{5}
4	(Italy) A Giannessi	6	7^{7}
8	(Slovenia) G Žemlja	2	5
PR	(Germany) C-M Stebe	6	7
(Kazakhstan) A Golubev	0	3
(El Salvador) M Arévalo	6	6
WC	(Germany) D Masur	7^{7}	6
Alt	(Belgium) Y Mertens	6^{4}	3
LL	(Switzerland) A Bossel
2/Alt	(Argentina) G Andreozzi	w/o

Second round
6	(Russia) T Gabashvili	3	6	3
(Germany) D Brands	6	1	6
Q	(Germany) N Langer	6	6
4	(Italy) A Giannessi	2	0
PR	(Germany) C-M Stebe	7^{7}	7
(El Salvador) M Arévalo	6^{1}	5
WC	(Germany) D Masur	6	6
2/Alt	(Argentina) G Andreozzi	1	2

Quarterfinals
(Germany) D Brands	6^{0}	2
Q	(Germany) N Langer	7^{7}	6
PR	(Germany) C-M Stebe	4	7	4
WC	(Germany) D Masur	6	5	6

Semifinals
Q	(Germany) N Langer	6	6
WC	(Germany) D Masur	1	3
