= 2017 Koblenz Open =

- Date: 17–22 January
- Edition: 1st
- Surface: Hard (indoor)
- Location: Koblenz, Germany

Champions

Singles
- (Belgium) Ruben Bemelmans

Doubles
- (Chile) Hans Podlipnik / (Belarus) Andrei Vasilevski
- Koblenz Open

The 2017 Koblenz Open was a professional tennis tournament played on indoor hard courts. It was the first edition of the tournament which was part of the 2017 ATP Challenger Tour. It took place in Koblenz, Germany between 17 and 22 January 2017.

== Singles main-draw entrants ==
=== Seeds ===
| Country | Player | Rank^{1} | Seed |
|---|---|---|---|
| CZE | Lukáš Rosol | 113 | 1 |
| ARG | Guido Andreozzi | 115 | 2 |
| ~~GER~~ | ~~Benjamin Becker~~ | ~~120~~ | ~~3~~ |
| ITA | Alessandro Giannessi | 124 | 4 |
| ROU | Marius Copil | 127 | 5 |
| RUS | Teymuraz Gabashvili | 140 | 6 |
| ARG | Marco Trungelliti | 150 | 7 |
| SLO | Grega Žemlja | 152 | 8 |

- ^{1} Rankings are as of January 9, 2017.

=== Other entrants ===
The following players received wildcards into the singles main draw:

- (Germany) Florian Broska
- (Germany) Jan Choinski
- (Germany) Benjamin Hassan
- (Germany) Daniel Masur

The following player received entry into the singles main draw with a protected ranking:

- (Germany) Cedrik-Marcel Stebe

The following players received entry into the singles main draw as alternates:

- (Argentina) Guido Andreozzi
- (France) Grégoire Barrère
- (Belgium) Yannick Mertens

The following players received entry from the qualifying draw:

- (Slovakia) Filip Horanský
- (Germany) Nils Langer
- (Switzerland) Yann Marti
- (Poland) Michał Przysiężny

The following players received entry into the singles main draw as lucky losers:

- (Switzerland) Adrien Bossel
- (Romania) Adrian Ungur

== Champions ==
=== Singles ===
- (Belgium) Ruben Bemelmans def. (Germany) Nils Langer 6–4, 3–6, 7–6^{(7–0)}.

=== Doubles ===
- (Chile) Hans Podlipnik / (Belarus) Andrei Vasilevski def. (Czech Republic) Roman Jebavý / (Czech Republic) Lukáš Rosol 7–5, 3–6, [16–14].
