= Mats Moraing =

German tennis player

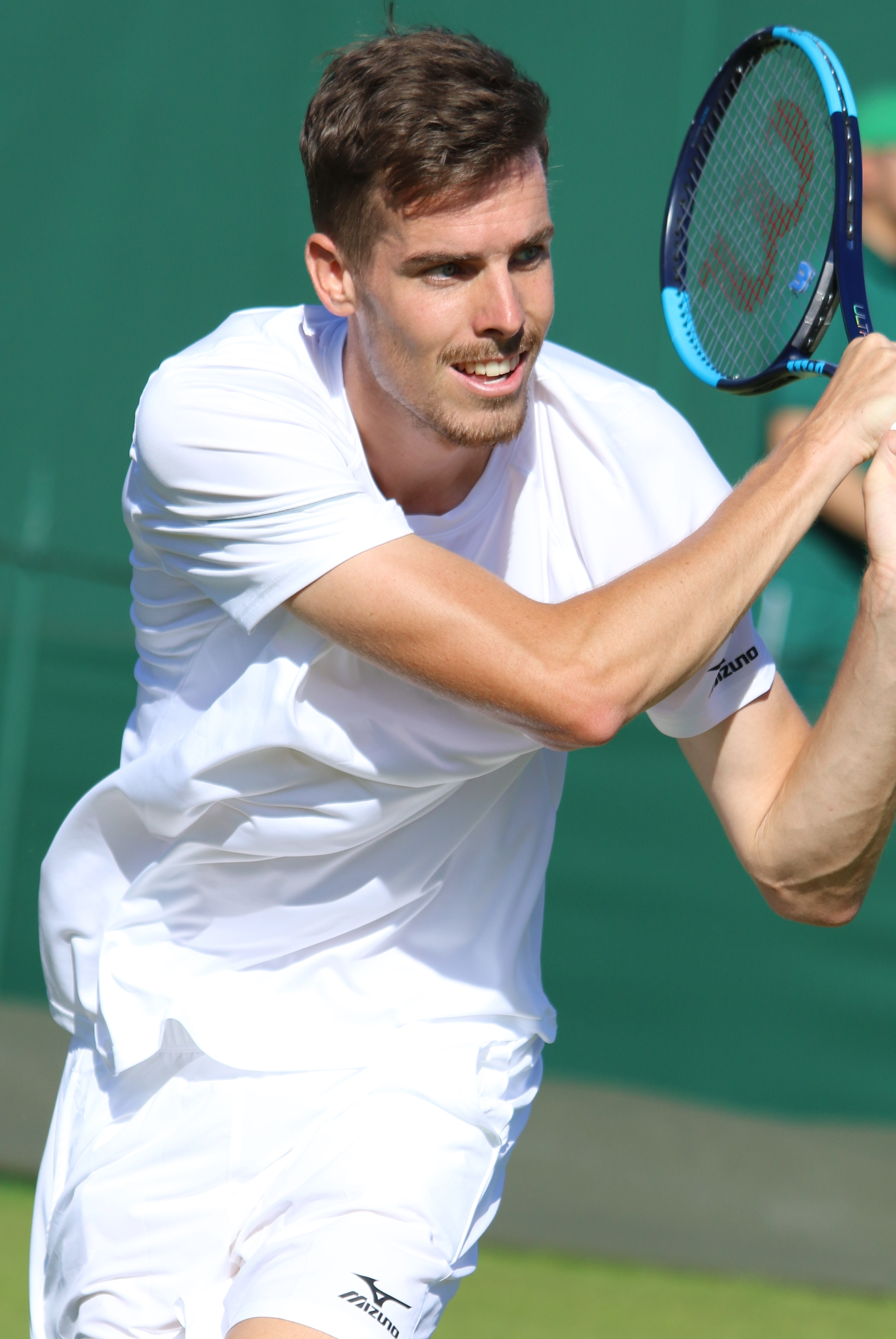
- Moraing at the 2018 Wimbledon Championships
- Country (sports): Germany
- Residence: Mülheim, Germany
- Born: 20 June 1992 (age 33) Mülheim, Germany
- Height: 1.98 m (6 ft 6 in)
- Turned pro: 2013
- Plays: Left-handed (two-handed backhand)
- Coach: Peter Moraing
- Prize money: $609,027

Singles
- Career record: 1–2 (in ATP Tour and Grand Slam main draw matches)
- Career titles: 0
- Highest ranking: No. 115 (23 May 2022)

Grand Slam singles results
- Australian Open: Q3 (2019)
- French Open: Q2 (2019)
- Wimbledon: Q2 (2018, 2019)
- US Open: Q3 (2021)

Doubles
- Career record: 0–1
- Career titles: 0
- Highest ranking: No. 282 (11 February 2019)

Mats Hans Moraing (born 20 June 1992) is a German professional tennis player. He achieved his career high ATP singles ranking of world No. 115 on 23 May 2022 and a doubles ranking of world No. 282 achieved on 11 February 2022.

== Personal life ==
Mats is the son of former German tennis player Heiner Moraing and is coached by his uncle Peter Moraing, also a former professional player.

== Professional career ==
=== 2013–17 ===
Moraing contested mainly on the ITF Futures Tour, where he won eight titles.

=== 2018: Top 150 debut ===
Moraing won his maiden ATP Challenger singles title at the Koblenz Open. He made his top 150 debut on 16 July 2018 at world No. 149.

=== 2019: ATP debut ===
Moraing made his ATP main draw debut as a qualifier at the Halle Open.

=== 2021 ===
Moraing won his first ATP Tour-level match at the Belgrade Open. As a lucky loser, he defeated Egor Gerasimov in the first round after saving 3 match points and a 4–6, 0–4 deficit. In the second round he lost in straight sets to the number 1 seed and world No. 1 Novak Djokovic.

=== 2022: Top 125 debut ===
He made his debut in the top 125 on 21 March 2022.

== Singles performance timeline ==
Key
W	F	SF	QF	#R	RR	Q#	DNQ	A	NH

(W) winner; (F) finalist; (SF) semifinalist; (QF) quarterfinalist; (#R) rounds 4, 3, 2, 1; (RR) round-robin stage; (Q#) qualification round; (DNQ) did not qualify; (A) absent; (NH) not held; (SR) strike rate (events won / competed); (W–L) win–loss record.
To avoid confusion and double counting, these charts are updated at the conclusion of a tournament or when the player's participation has ended.

Current through the 2023 ATP Tour.

Tournament	2014	2015	2016	2017	2018	2019	2020	2021	2022	2023	2024	W–L
Grand Slam tournaments
Australian Open	A	A	A	A	A	Q3	Q1	Q1	Q1	A	A	0–0
French Open	A	A	A	A	Q1	Q2	A	A	Q1	A		0–0
Wimbledon	A	A	A	A	Q2	Q2	NH	Q1	Q1	A		0–0
US Open	A	A	A	A	Q1	Q1	A	Q3	Q2	A		0–0
ATP Tour Masters 1000
Indian Wells Masters	A	A	A	A	A	A	NH	A	Q2	A		0–0
Miami Open	A	A	A	A	A	A	NH	A	Q1	A		0–0
Career statistics
Tournaments	0	0	0	0	0	1	0	1	0	0	0	2
Overall win–loss	0–0	0–0	0–0	0–0	0–0	0–1	0–0	1–1	0–0	0–0	0–0	1–2
Year-end ranking	480	481	454	273	150	187	247	152	303	597		

== ATP Challenger and ITF Futures finals ==
=== Singles: 22 (13–9) ===
Legend ATP Challenger (5–3) ITF Futures (8–6)	Finals by surface Hard (4–6) Clay (6–3) Grass (0–0) Carpet (3–0)

Result	W–L	Date	Tournament	Tier	Surface	Opponent	Score
Loss	0–1	May 2014	Turkey F15, Antalya	Futures	Hard	(Czech Republic) Michal Konecny	1–6, 4–6
Loss	0–2	Jul 2014	Germany F6, Saarlouis	Futures	Clay	(Chile) Nicolás Jarry	4–6, 6–4, 4–6
Win	1–2	Oct 2014	Germany F17, Göhren-Lebbin	Futures	Carpet (i)	(Germany) Maximilian Marterer	7–6^{(7–4)}, 7–6^{(7–4)}
Win	2–2	Oct 2015	Germany F15, Leimen	Futures	Hard (i)	(Germany) Jan Choinski	6–4, 3–6, 6–2
Loss	2–3	Nov 2015	Great Britain F11, Bath	Futures	Hard (i)	(Canada) Filip Peliwo	6–2, 1–6, 2–6
Win	3–3	Jan 2016	Germany F2, Kaarst	Futures	Carpet (i)	(Croatia) Filip Veger	6–1, 7–6^{(8–6)}
Win	4–3	Aug 2016	Belgium F8, Ostend	Futures	Clay	(France) Alexis Musialek	3–6, 6–3, 6–4
Loss	4–4	Aug 2016	Belgium F8, Eupen	Futures	Clay	(Spain) Jaume Munar	6–7^{(5–7)}, 2–6
Win	5–4	Oct 2016	Germany F14, Oberhaching	Futures	Hard (i)	(Germany) Robin Kern	6–4, 6–2
Win	6–4	Jan 2017	Germany F3, Nußloch	Futures	Carpet (i)	(Germany) Daniel Masur	7–6^{(7–5)}, 7–6^{(7–5)}
Loss	6–5	Apr 2017	Israel F4, Ramat Gan	Futures	Hard	(Israel) Edan Leshem	3–6, 5–5, ret.
Loss	6–6	Jul 2017	Belgium F6, Duinbergen	Futures	Clay	(Belgium) Julien Cagnina	0–6, 6–2, 5–7
Win	7–6	Aug 2017	Poland F9, Bydgoszcz	Futures	Clay	(Australia) Aleksandar Vukic	6–2, 7–5
Win	8–6	Aug 2017	Poland F10, Poznań	Futures	Clay	(Czech Republic) Zdeněk Kolář	7–6^{(7–5)}, 6–4
Loss	0–1	Jan 2018	Bangkok, Thailand	Challenger	Hard	(Spain) Marcel Granollers	6–4, 3–6, 5–7
Win	1–1	Jan 2018	Koblenz, Germany	Challenger	Hard (i)	(France) Kenny de Schepper	6–2, 6–1
Loss	1–2	Jan 2019	Playford, Australia	Challenger	Hard	(Brazil) Rogério Dutra Silva	3–6, 2–6
Win	2–2	Jul 2019	Amersfoort, Netherlands	Challenger	Clay	(Belgium) Kimmer Coppejans	6–2, 3–6, 6–3
Win	3–2	Jun 2021	Forlì, Italy	Challenger	Clay	(France) Quentin Halys	3–6, 6–1, 7–5
Win	4–2	Sep 2021	Tulln, Austria	Challenger	Clay	(France) Hugo Gaston	6–2, 6–1
Loss	4–3	Sep 2021	Rennes, France	Challenger	Hard	(France) Benjamin Bonzi	6–7^{(3–7)}, 6–7^{(3–7)}
Win	5–3	Mar 2022	Turin, Italy	Challenger	Hard (i)	(France) Quentin Halys	7–6^{(13–11)}, 6–3

=== Doubles: 7 (3–4) ===
Legend
ATP Challenger (1–0)
ITF Futures (2–4)

Result	W–L	Date	Tournament	Tier	Surface	Partner	Opponents	Score
Loss	0–1	Jul 2013	Germany F11, Dortmund	Futures	Clay	(Germany) Tom Schönenberg	(Germany) Andreas Mies (Germany) Oscar Otte	5–7, 1–6
Loss	0–2	Dec 2013	Qatar F5, Doha	Futures	Hard	(Germany) Tom Schönenberg	(Slovakia) Marko Danis (Slovakia) Ivo Klec	6–4, 3–6, [9–11]
Win	1–2	Oct 2014	Germany F17, Göhren-Lebbin	Futures	Carpet (i)	(Germany) Maximilian Dinslaken	(Netherlands) Romano Frantzen (Netherlands) Alban Meuffels	3–6, 6–4, [10–6]
Loss	1–3	Dec 2015	Qatar F5, Doha	Futures	Hard	(United Kingdom) Luke Bambridge	(Belgium) Joris De Loore (Belgium) Michael Geerts	5–7, 3–6
Loss	1–4	Dec 2015	Qatar F6, Doha	Futures	Hard	(United Kingdom) Luke Bambridge	(India) Haadin Salim Bava (China) Aoxiong Wang	2–6, 6–3, [3–10]
Win	2–4	Jul 2017	Germany F8, Kassel	Futures	Clay	(Germany) Tom Schönenberg	(Austria) Maximilian Neuchrist (Austria) David Pichler	7–6^{(7–4)}, 2–6, [10–2]
Win	1–0	April 2021	Oeiras, Portugal	Challenger	Clay	(Germany) Oscar Otte	(Italy) Riccardo Bonadio (Kazakhstan) Denis Yevseyev	6–1, 6–4
