= Tibo Colson =

Belgium tennis player

- Country (sports): Belgium
- Born: 12 July 2000 (age 25) Genk, Belgium
- Height: 1.96 m (6 ft 5 in)
- Plays: Right-handed (two-handed backhand)
- Coach: Christopher Heyman; Ruben Bemelmans
- Prize money: US $103,980

Singles
- Highest ranking: No. 390 (13 April 2026)
- Current ranking: No. 390 (13 April 2026)

Doubles
- Career record: 1–2
- Highest ranking: No. 443 (16 March 2026)
- Current ranking: No. 463 (13 April 2026)
- Last updated on: 13 April 2026.

Tibo Colson (born 12 July 2000) is a Belgian tennis player. He has a career high ranking of No. 390 achieved on 13 April 2026 and a doubles ranking of world No. 443 achieved on 16 March 2026.

== Career ==
=== Juniors ===
Since 2016, Colson has been training at the Topsportcentrum Tennis Vlaanderen in Wilrijk, Antwerp, Belgium alongside Zizou Bergs and later also alongside 2023 Australian Open Junior champion Alexander Blockx.

Colson has won six junior titles in 2016 and 2017.

=== 2022-2023: ATP doubles debut ===
The start of his professional career was beset by knee injuries, and it was not until he was 22 years-old that he won his first ITF level professional tournament, in October 2022 in Maputo, Mozambique. In October 2023, he received a wildcard in doubles for the European Open in Antwerp, alongside compatriot Zizou Bergs.

He teamed up with Dutchman Thijmen Loof to defeat Shintaro Imai and Moerani Bouzige in the final of 2024 Amman Mineral Men's World Tennis Championship in Bali, in straight sets.
