= Sander Arends =

Dutch tennis player (born 1991)

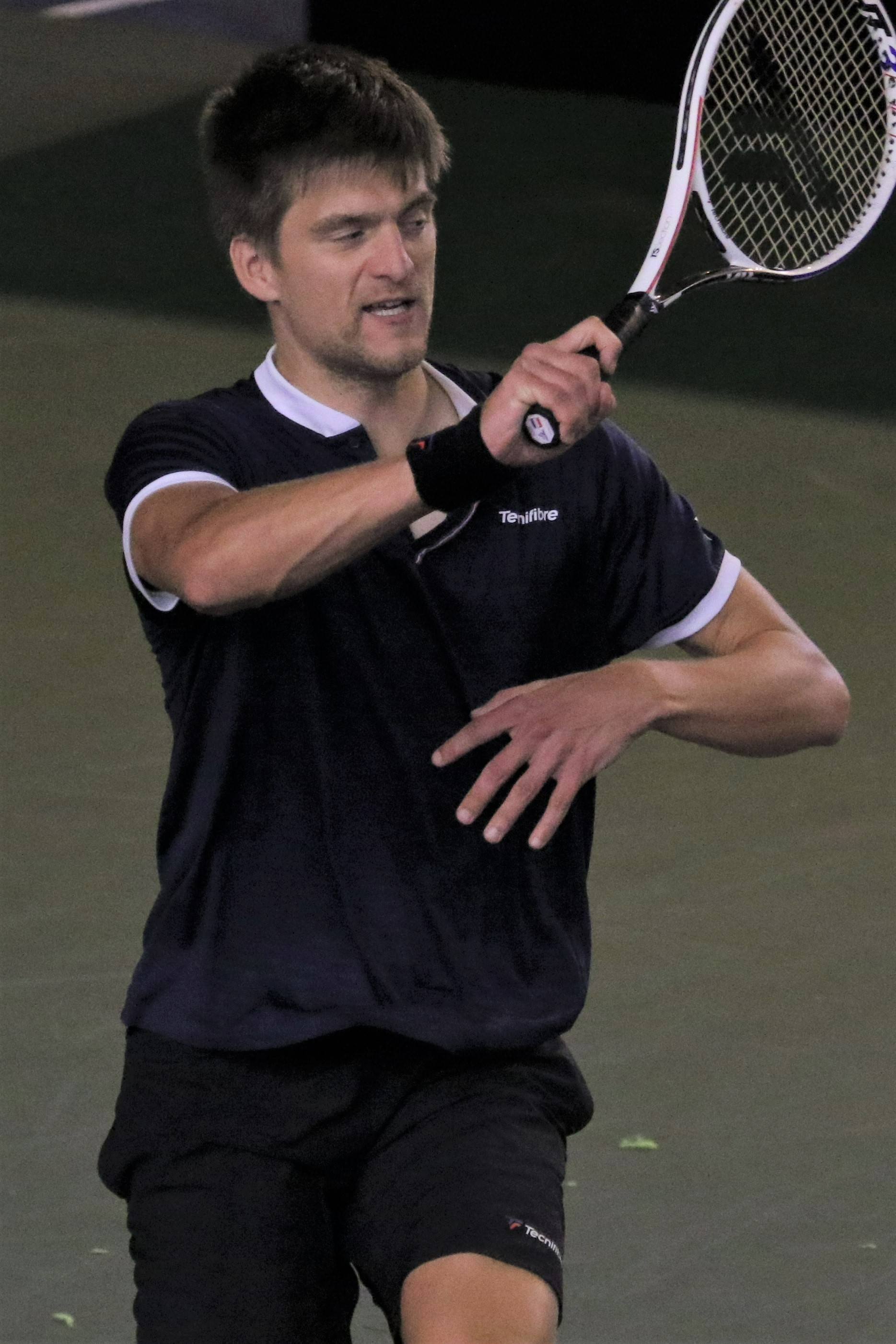
- Arends at the 2022 Internationaux de Tennis de Vendée
- Country (sports): Netherlands
- Residence: Leeuwarden, Netherlands
- Born: 9 August 1991 (age 35) Leeuwarden, Netherlands
- Height: 1.96 m (6 ft 5 in)
- Plays: Right-handed (two handed-backhand)
- Coach: Gerard Van Hellemondt
- Prize money: $ 977,903

Singles
- Career record: 0–0
- Highest ranking: No. 1,057 (12 January 2015)

Doubles
- Career record: 85–95
- Career titles: 6
- Highest ranking: No. 23 (21 July 2025)
- Current ranking: No. 50 (15 June 2026)

Grand Slam doubles results
- Australian Open: 2R (2025)
- French Open: QF (2025, 2026)
- Wimbledon: 2R (2018, 2021)
- US Open: 2R (2025)

Grand Slam mixed doubles results
- Wimbledon: 1R (2025)
- Last updated on: 15 June 2025.

Sander Arends (born 9 August 1991) is a Dutch professional tennis player who specializes in doubles. He has a career-high ATP doubles ranking of world No. 23, achieved on 21 July 2025. Arends has won six doubles ATP Tour titles, three with Luke Johnson.

He has also won 31 doubles titles on the ATP Challenger and 11 on the ITF Tour.

== Career ==
In September 2024, Arends won his 30th doubles title at the ATP Challenger Tour Saint-Tropez Open, playing alongside Luke Johnson. Two months later the pair won the doubles at the 2024 Moselle Open, defeating Pierre-Hugues Herbert and Albano Olivetti in the final.

Arends and Johnson won the doubles title at the 2025 Hong Kong Open, overcoming Karen Khachanov and Andrey Rublev in the final. They also won the ATP 500 2025 Barcelona Open, defeating Joe Salisbury and Neal Skupski in the final.

== Performance timeline ==
Key
W	F	SF	QF	#R	RR	Q#	DNQ	A	NH

(W) winner; (F) finalist; (SF) semifinalist; (QF) quarterfinalist; (#R) rounds 4, 3, 2, 1; (RR) round-robin stage; (Q#) qualification round; (DNQ) did not qualify; (A) absent; (NH) not held; (SR) strike rate (events won / competed); (W–L) win–loss record.
To avoid confusion and double counting, these charts are updated at the conclusion of a tournament or when the player's participation has ended.

=== Doubles ===
Tournament	2017	2018	2019	2020	2021	2022	2023	2024	2025	2026	SR	W–L	Win %
Grand Slam tournaments
Australian Open	A	A	A	1R	A	A	A	A	2R	1R	0 / 3	1–3	25%
French Open	A	1R	A	A	A	1R	A	1R	QF	QF	0 / 5	6–5	55%
Wimbledon	1R	2R	1R	NH	2R	1R	A	1R	A		0 / 6	2–6	25%
US Open	A	1R	A	A	A	A	A	1R	2R		0 / 3	1–3	25%
Win–loss	0–1	1–3	0–1	0–1	1–1	0–2	0–0	0–3	5–3	3–2	0 / 17	10–17	37%
ATP Masters 1000
Indian Wells Masters	A	A	A	NH	A	A	A	A	A		0 / 0	0–0	–
Miami Open	A	A	A	NH	A	A	A	A	A		0 / 0	0–0	–
Monte Carlo Masters	A	A	A	NH	A	A	A	A	A		0 / 0	0–0	–
Madrid Open	A	A	A	NH	A	A	A	A	1R		0 / 1	0-1	0%
Italian Open	A	A	A	A	A	A	A	A	2R		0 / 1	1–1	50%
Canadian Open	A	A	A	NH	A	A	A	A	QF		0 / 1	2–1	67%
Cincinnati Masters	A	A	A	A	A	A	A	A	1R		0 / 1	0–1	0%
Shanghai Masters	A	A	A	NH			A	A	1R		0 / 1	0–1	0%
Paris Masters	A	A	A	A	A	A	A	A	1R		0 / 1	0–1	0%
Win–loss	0–0	0–0	0–0	0–0	0–0	0–0	0–0	0–0	3–6	0–0	0 / 6	3–6	33%

== ATP career finals ==
=== Doubles: 10 (6 titles, 5 runner-ups) ===
Legend Grand Slam tournaments (0–0) ATP World Tour Finals (0–0) ATP World Tour Masters 1000 (0–0) ATP World Tour 500 Series (1–1) ATP World Tour 250 Series (5–4)	Titles by surface Hard (2–3) Clay (3–1) Grass (1–1)	Titles by setting Outdoor (5–4) Indoor (1–1)

Result	W–L	Date	Tournament	Tier	Surface	Partner	Opponents	Score
Loss	0–1	Jul 2017	Swedish Open, Sweden	250 Series	Clay	(Netherlands) Matwé Middelkoop	(Austria) Julian Knowle (Germany) Philipp Petzschner	2–6, 6–3, [7–10]
Loss	0–2	Jun 2018	Antalya Open, Turkey	250 Series	Grass	(Netherlands) Matwé Middelkoop	(Brazil) Marcelo Demoliner (Mexico) Santiago González	5–7, 7–6^{(8–6)}, [8–10]
Loss	0–3	Mar 2021	Open 13, France	250 Series	Hard (i)	(Netherlands) David Pel	(United Kingdom) Lloyd Glasspool (Finland) Harri Heliövaara	5–7, 6–7^{(4–7)}
Win	1–3	Jul 2021	Swedish Open, Sweden	250 Series	Clay	(Netherlands) David Pel	(Germany) Andre Begemann (France) Albano Olivetti	6–4, 6–2
Win	2–3	Nov 2024	Moselle Open, France	250 Series	Hard (i)	(United Kingdom) Luke Johnson	(France) Pierre-Hugues Herbert (France) Albano Olivetti	6–4, 3–6, [10–3]
Win	3–3	Jan 2025	Hong Kong Open, Hong Kong	250 Series	Hard	(United Kingdom) Luke Johnson	Karen Khachanov; Andrey Rublev	7–5, 4–6, [10–7]
Win	4–3	Apr 2025	Barcelona Open, Spain	500 Series	Clay	(United Kingdom) Luke Johnson	(United Kingdom) Joe Salisbury (United Kingdom) Neal Skupski	6–3, 6–7^{(1–7)}, [10–6]
Win	5–3	Jul 2025	Swedish Open, Sweden (2)	250 Series	Clay	(Argentina) Guido Andreozzi	(Czech Republic) Adam Pavlásek (Poland) Jan Zieliński	6–7^{(4–7)}, 7–5, [10–6]
Win	6–3	Jun 2026	Rosmalen Open, Netherlands	250 Series	Grass	(Netherlands) David Pel	(Belgium) Zizou Bergs (France) Arthur Rinderknech	7–6^{(8–6)}, 7–6^{(7–5)}
Loss	6–4	Sep 2026	Hangzhou Open, China	250 Series	Hard	(Netherlands) David Pel	(Portugal) Francisco Cabral (United States) JJ Tracy	5–7, 4–6
Loss	6–5	Oct 2026	China Open, China	500 Series	Hard	(Netherlands) David Pel	(United Kingdom) Julian Cash (United Kingdom) Lloyd Glasspool	3–6, 6–3, [6–10]

== ATP Challenger and ITF Tour finals ==
=== Doubles: 73 (43–30) ===
Legend (doubles) ATP Challenger Tour (32–22) ITF Futures Tour (11–8)	Titles by surface Hard (25–19) Clay (12–10) Grass (0–0) Carpet (6–1)

Result	W–L	Date	Tournament	Tier	Surface	Partner	Opponents	Score
Loss	0–1	Sep 2012	Netherlands F7, Wierden	Futures	Clay	(Netherlands) Elroy Middendorp	(Russia) Victor Baluda (Netherlands) Yannick Ebbinghaus	3–6, 2–6
Win	1–1	Jun 2014	Netherlands F2, Alkmaar	Futures	Clay	(Netherlands) Niels Lootsma	(Venezuela) Jordi Muñoz Abreu (Netherlands) Mark Vervoort	6–0, 3–6, [10–7]
Win	2–1	Jul 2014	Netherlands F4, Middelburg	Futures	Clay	(Netherlands) Niels Lootsma	(Netherlands) Jelle Sels (Netherlands) Vincent Van Den Honert	6–4, 6–2
Loss	2–2	Aug 2014	Denmark F2, Copenhagen	Futures	Clay	(Netherlands) Niels Lootsma	(Sweden) Isak Arvidsson (Denmark) Thomas Kromann	5–7, 6–7^{(2–7)}
Loss	2–3	Oct 2014	France F22, Saint-Dizier	Futures	Hard (i)	(Netherlands) Niels Lootsma	(France) Rémi Boutillier (France) Elie Rousset	2–6, 6–4, [3–10]
Loss	2–4	Nov 2014	Norway F2, Oslo	Futures	Hard (i)	(United Kingdom) Darren Walsh	(Croatia) Ivan Sabanov (Croatia) Matej Sabanov	6–4, 3–6, [4–10]
Loss	2–5	Dec 2014	Qatar F6, Doha	Futures	Hard	(United Kingdom) Richard Gabb	(Poland) Adam Chadaj (Poland) Adam Majchrowicz	6–7^{(4–7)}, 6–4, [4–10]
Win	3–5	Feb 2015	Germany F3, Kaarst	Futures	Carpet (i)	(Poland) Adam Majchrowicz	(Netherlands) Wesley Koolhof (Netherlands) Matwé Middelkoop	6–3, 6–4
Win	4–5	Feb 2015	Germany F4, Nußloch	Futures	Carpet (i)	(Poland) Adam Majchrowicz	(Germany) Denis Kapric (Germany) Lukas Ruepke	6–4, 3–6, [10–5]
Loss	4–6	Feb 2015	Italy F1, Sondrio	Futures	Hard (i)	(Netherlands) Niels Lootsma	(Italy) Francesco Borgo (Lithuania) Laurynas Grigelis	2–6, 6–3, [7–10]
Win	5–6	Feb 2015	Italy F2, Trento	Futures	Carpet (i)	(Netherlands) Niels Lootsma	(Republic of Ireland) Sam Barry (Croatia) Viktor Galović	7–6^{(7–2)}, 6–4
Loss	5–7	Jul 2015	Netherlands F4, Amstelveen	Futures	Clay	(Netherlands) Niels Lootsma	(United States) Deiton Baughman (Brazil) Eduardo Dischinger	6–2, 2–6, [6–10]
Loss	5–8	Jul 2015	Germany F7, Kassel	Futures	Clay	(Australia) Adam Hubble	(Bulgaria) Alexandar Lazov (Egypt) Karim-Mohamed Maamoun	2–6, 7–5, [8–10]
Win	6–8	Aug 2015	Belgium F8, Middelkerke	Futures	Hard	(Uruguay) Ariel Behar	(Belgium) Sander Gillé (Belgium) Joran Vliegen	6–7^{(1–7)}, 6–4, [10–7]
Win	7–8	Sep 2015	France F18, Mulhouse	Futures	Hard (i)	(Poland) Adam Majchrowicz	(Germany) Moritz Baumann (Germany) Yannick Hanfmann	Walkover
Win	8–8	Sep 2015	France F19, Plaisir	Futures	Hard (i)	(Poland) Adam Majchrowicz	(United States) Evan King (United States) Anderson Reed	6–4, 6–4
Win	9–8	Oct 2015	France F21, Nevers	Futures	Hard (i)	(Netherlands) Niels Lootsma	(France) Jonathan Eysseric (France) Tom Jomby	6–4, 7–5
Win	10–8	Oct 2015	France F22, Saint-Dizier	Futures	Hard (i)	(Netherlands) Niels Lootsma	(France) Ronan Joncour (Portugal) Gonçalo Oliveira	7–5, 7–6^{(10–8)}
Win	11–8	Nov 2015	Mouilleron-le-Captif, France	Challenger	Hard (i)	(Poland) Adam Majchrowicz	(Belarus) Aliaksandr Bury (Sweden) Andreas Siljeström	6–3, 5–7, [10–8]
Win	12–8	Nov 2015	Czech Republic F7, Jablonec nad Nisou	Futures	Carpet (i)	(Poland) Adam Majchrowicz	(Belgium) Niels Desein (Czech Republic) Libor Salaba	6–3, 6–4
Win	13–8	May 2016	Ostrava, Czech Republic	Challenger	Clay	(Austria) Tristan-Samuel Weissborn	(Czech Republic) Lukáš Dlouhý (Chile) Hans Podlipnik-Castillo	7–6^{(10–8)}, 6–7^{(4–7)}, [10–5]
Loss	13–9	May 2016	Rome, Italy	Challenger	Clay	(Austria) Tristan-Samuel Weissborn	(China) Bai Yan (China) Li Zhe	3–6, 6–3, [9–11]
Win	14–9	May 2016	Heilbronn, Germany	Challenger	Clay	(Austria) Tristan-Samuel Weissborn	(Croatia) Nikola Mektić (Croatia) Antonio Šančić	6–3, 6–4
Loss	14–10	Oct 2016	Mons, Belgium	Challenger	Hard (i)	(Netherlands) Wesley Koolhof	(Austria) Julian Knowle (Austria) Jürgen Melzer	6–7^{(4–7)}, 6–7^{(4–7)}
Win	15–10	Oct 2016	Brest, France	Challenger	Hard (i)	(Poland) Mateusz Kowalczyk	(Switzerland) Marco Chiudinelli (Italy) Luca Vanni	6–7^{(2–7)}, 6–3, [10–5]
Win	16–10	Sep 2017	Como, Italy	Challenger	Clay	(Croatia) Antonio Šančić	(Belarus) Aliaksandr Bury (Germany) Kevin Krawietz	7–6^{(7–1)}, 6–2
Win	17–10	Oct 2017	Ortisei, Italy	Challenger	Hard (i)	(Croatia) Antonio Šančić	(Germany) Jeremy Jahn (Israel) Edan Leshem	6–2, 5–7, [13–11]
Win	18–10	Oct 2017	Brest, France (2)	Challenger	Hard (i)	(Croatia) Antonio Šančić	(United Kingdom) Scott Clayton (India) Divij Sharan	6–4, 7–5
Win	19–10	Nov 2017	Eckental, Germany	Challenger	Carpet (i)	(Czech Republic) Roman Jebavý	(United Kingdom) Ken Skupski (United Kingdom) Neal Skupski	6–2, 6–4
Loss	19–11	Nov 2017	Bratislava, Slovakia	Challenger	Hard (i)	(Czech Republic) Antonio Šančić	(United Kingdom) Ken Skupski (United Kingdom) Neal Skupski	7–5, 3–6, [8–10]
Win	20–11	Nov 2017	Brescia, Italy	Challenger	Carpet (i)	(Belgium) Sander Gillé	(Switzerland) Luca Margaroli (Austria) Tristan-Samuel Weissborn	6–2, 6–3
Loss	20–12	Nov 2017	Andria, Italy	Challenger	Carpet (i)	(Belgium) Sander Gillé	(Italy) Lorenzo Sonego (Italy) Andrea Vavassori	6–3, 3–6, [10–7]
Loss	20–13	Jan 2018	Koblenz, Germany	Challenger	Hard (i)	(Croatia) Antonio Šančić	(Monaco) Romain Arneodo (Austria) Tristan-Samuel Weissborn	7–6^{(7–4)}, 5–7, [6–10]
Loss	20–14	Jan 2018	Rennes, France	Challenger	Hard (i)	(Croatia) Antonio Šančić	(Belgium) Sander Gillé (Belgium) Joran Vliegen	3–6, 7–6^{(7–1)}, [7–10]
Win	21–14	Mar 2018	Saint Brieuc, France	Challenger	Hard (i)	(Austria) Tristan-Samuel Weissborn	(United Kingdom) Luke Bambridge (United Kingdom) Joe Salisbury	4–6, 6–1, [10–7]
Win	22–14	May 2018	Braga, Portugal	Challenger	Clay	(Canada) Adil Shamasdin	(Uruguay) Ariel Behar (Mexico) Miguel Ángel Reyes-Varela	6–2, 6–1
Win	23–14	Jan 2019	Rennes, France	Challenger	Hard (i)	(Austria) Tristan-Samuel Weissborn	(Netherlands) David Pel (Croatia) Antonio Šančić	6–4, 6–4
Loss	23–15	Mar 2019	Pau, France	Challenger	Hard (i)	(Austria) Tristan-Samuel Weissborn	(United Kingdom) Scott Clayton (Canada) Adil Shamasdin	6–7^{(4–7)}, 7–5, [8–10]
Loss	23–16	Apr 2019	Taipei, Taiwan	Challenger	Hard (i)	(Austria) Tristan-Samuel Weissborn	(India) Sriram Balaji (Israel) Jonathan Erlich	3–6, 2–6
Win	24–16	Apr 2019	Nanchang, China	Challenger	Clay (i)	(Austria) Tristan-Samuel Weissborn	(Australia) Alex Bolt (Australia) Akira Santillan	6–2, 6–4
Win	25–16	Jul 2019	Tampere, Finland	Challenger	Hard	(Netherlands) David Pel	(Russia) Ivan Nedelko (Russia) Alexander Zhurbin	6–0, 6–2
Win	26–16	Jul 2019	Segovia, Spain	Challenger	Hard	(Netherlands) David Pel	(Brazil) Orlando Luz (Brazil) Felipe Meligeni Alves	6–4, 7–6^{(7–3)}
Win	27–16	Sep 2019	Mallorca, Spain	Challenger	Hard	(Netherlands) David Pel	(Poland) Karol Drzewiecki (Poland) Szymon Walków	7–5, 6–4
Loss	27–17	Sep 2019	Cassis, France	Challenger	Hard	(Netherlands) David Pel	(Sweden) André Göransson (Netherlands) Sem Verbeek	6–7^{(6–8)}, 6–4, [9–11]
Loss	27–18	Oct 2019	Mouilleron-le-Captif, France	Challenger	Hard	(Netherlands) David Pel	(United Kingdom) Jonny O'Mara (United Kingdom) Ken Skupski	1–6, 4–6
Loss	27–19	Nov 2019	Eckental, Germany	Challenger	Hard (i)	(Czech Republic) Roman Jebavy	(United Kingdom) Ken Skupski (Australia) John-Patrick Smith	6-7^{(2–7)}, 4–6
Loss	27–20	Nov 2019	Ortisei, Italy	Challenger	Hard (i)	(Netherlands) David Pel	(Serbia) Nikola Cacic (Croatia) Antonio Sancic	7-6^{(7–5)}, 6-7^{(3–7)}, [7-10]
Win	28–20	Feb 2020	Koblenz, Germany	Challenger	Hard (i)	(Netherlands) David Pel	(Germany) Julian Lenz (Germany) Yannick Maden	7–6^{(7–4)}, 7–6^{(7–3)}
Win	29–20	Aug 2020	Prague, Czech Republic	Challenger	Clay	(Netherlands) David Pel	(Sweden) André Göransson (Portugal) Gonçalo Oliveira	7–5, 7–6^{(7–5)}
Loss	29–21	June 2021	Bratislava, Slovakia	Challenger	Clay	(Venezuela) Luis David Martínez	(Ukraine) Denys Molchanov (Kazakhstan) Aleksandr Nedovyesov	6-7^{(5–7)}, 1–6
Loss	29–22	Jan 2022	Quimper, France	Challenger	Hard (i)	(Netherlands) David Pel	(France) Albano Olivetti (Spain) David Vega Hernández	6-3, 4–6, [8-10]
Loss	29–23	Feb 2022	Turin, Italy	Challenger	Hard (i)	(Netherlands) David Pel	(Belgium) Ruben Bemelmans (Germany) Daniel Masur	6-3, 3–6, [8-10]
Win	30–23	Mar 2022	Saint-Brieuc, France	Challenger	Hard (i)	(Netherlands) David Pel	(France) Jonathan Eysseric (Netherlands) Robin Haase	6-3, 6–3
Win	31–23	May 2022	Mauthausen, Austria	Challenger	Clay	(Netherlands) David Pel	(Germany) Johannes Härteis (Lebanon) Benjamin Hassan	6-4, 6–3
Loss	31–24	Jun 2022	Lyon, France	Challenger	Clay	(Netherlands) David Pel	(Monaco) Romain Arneodo (France) Jonathan Eysseric	5-7, 6–4, [4-10]
Win	32–24	Oct 2022	Mouilleron-le-Captif, France	Challenger	Hard (i)	(Netherlands) David Pel	(India) Purav Raja (India) Divij Sharan	6–7^{(1–7)}, 7–6^{(8–6)}, [10–6]
Win	33–24	Jan 2023	Oeiras, Portugal	Challenger	Hard (i)	(Netherlands) David Pel	(Finland) Patrik Niklas-Salminen (Netherlands) Bart Stevens	6–3, 7–6^{(7–3)}
Loss	33–25	May 2023	Francavilla al Mare, Italy	Challenger	Clay	(Greece) Petros Tsitsipas	(Colombia) Nicolás Barrientos (Uruguay) Ariel Behar	6–7^{(1–7)}, 6–3, [6–10]
Loss	33–26	Sep 2023	Istanbul, Turkey	Challenger	Hard	(Pakistan) Aisam-ul-Haq Qureshi	(United Kingdom) Luke Johnson (Tunisia) Skander Mansouri	6–7^{(3–7)}, 3–6
Win	34–26	Sep 2023	Rennes, France	Challenger	Hard	(Netherlands) David Pel	(France) Antoine Escoffier (India) Niki Kaliyanda Poonacha	6–3, 6–2
Loss	34–27	Jan 2024	Ottignies-Louvain-la-Neuve, Belgium	Challenger	Hard	(Netherlands) Sem Verbeek	(United Kingdom) Luke Johnson (Tunisia) Skander Mansouri	5–7, 3–6
Win	35–27	Feb 2024	Koblenz, Germany	Challenger	Hard	(Netherlands) Sem Verbeek	(Germany) Jakob Schnaitter (Germany) Mark Wallner	6–4, 6–2
Loss	35–28	Feb 2024	Tenerife, Spain	Challenger	Hard	(Netherlands) Sem Verbeek	(Czech Republic) Petr Nouza (Czech Republic) Patrik Rikl	4–6, 6–4, [9–11]
Win	36–28	Mar 2024	Tenerife, Spain	Challenger	Hard	(Netherlands) Sem Verbeek	(Italy) Marco Bortolotti (Spain) Sergio Martos Gornes	6–4, 6–4
Win	37–28	Mar 2024	Lugano, Switzerland	Challenger	Hard (i)	(Netherlands) Sem Verbeek	(Germany) Constantin Frantzen (Germany) Hendrik Jebens	6–7^{(11–9)}, 7–6^{(1–7)}, [10–8]
Loss	37–29	May 2024	Francavilla al Mare, Italy	Challenger	Clay	(Netherlands) Matwe Middelkoop	(France) Théo Arribagé (Romania) Vlad Victor Cornea	6–7^{(1–7)}, 6–7^{(7–9)}
Win	38–29	Jul 2024	Braunschweig, Germany	Challenger	Clay	(Netherlands) Robin Haase	(India) Sriram Balaji (Ecuador) Gonzalo Escobar	4–6, 6–4, [10–8]
Win	39–29	Aug 2024	Porto, Portugal	Challenger	Hard	(United Kingdom) Luke Johnson	(United Kingdom) Joshua Paris (India) Ramkumar Ramanathan	6-3, 6–2
Win	40–29	Sep 2024	Rennes, France	Challenger	Clay	(France) Gregoire Jacq	(France) Antoine Escoffier (United Kingdom) Joshua Paris	6–4, 6–2
Win	41–29	Sep 2024	Saint-Tropez, France	Challenger	Hard	(United Kingdom) Luke Johnson	(Sweden) André Göransson (Netherlands) Sem Verbeek	3–6, 6–3, [10–4]
Win	42–29	Apr 2025	Monza, Italy	Challenger	Clay	(United Kingdom) Luke Johnson	(Italy) Filippo Romano (Italy) Jacopo Vasamì	6–1, 6–1
Loss	42–30	May 2026	Valencia, Spain	Challenger	Clay	(Netherlands) David Pel	(Germany) Constantin Frantzen (Netherlands) Robin Haase	4–6, 7–6^{(7–5)}, [9–11]
Win	43–30	Sep 2026	Rennes, France	Challenger	Hard (i)	(Netherlands) Bart Stevens	Ivan Liutarevich (United Kingdom) Joshua Paris	6–1, 6–1
