= Louis Wessels =

German tennis player

Louis Weßels
- Country (sports): Germany
- Residence: Detmold, Germany
- Born: 27 August 1998 (age 28) Bielefeld, Germany
- Height: 1.98 m (6 ft 6 in)
- Plays: Right-handed (two-anded backhand)
- Coach: Dirk Wessels
- Prize money: US $277,112

Singles
- Career record: 1–2 (at ATP Tour level, Grand Slam level, and in Davis Cup)
- Career titles: 0
- Highest ranking: No. 267 (11 July 2022)
- Current ranking: No. 420 (9 November 2026)

Doubles
- Career record: 0–0
- Career titles: 0
- Highest ranking: No. 335 (21 October 2024)
- Current ranking: No. 391 (9 November 2026)
- Last updated on: 9 November 2026.

Louis Wessels (German: Weßels; born 27 August 1998) is a German tennis player. He has a career-high ATP singles ranking of world No. 267 achieved on 11 July 2022 and a doubles ranking of No. 335 achieved on 21 October 2024.

== Tennis career ==
On the junior tour, Wessels has a career high ITF junior ranking of 17 achieved in May 2016. Wessels has reached the doubles semifinals at three of the four junior grand slams, including the 2015 Australian Open, 2015 US Open and the 2016 Wimbledon Championships.

Wessels made his ATP main draw debut at the 2016 German Open, where he upset Steven Diez in the first round. This victory made him the youngest player to win a main draw match on the 2016 ATP World Tour at that time.

Ranked No. 347, he qualified for his home tournament at the 2023 Halle Open having received a wildcard for the qualifying competition.

== ITF Futures/World Tennis Tour finals ==
=== Singles: 26 (12–14) ===
Finals by surface
Hard (1–1)
Clay (11–13)

Result	W–L	Date	Tournament	Surface	Opponent	Score
Loss	0–1	Aug 2017	Germany F12, Überlingen	Clay	(Switzerland) Adrian Bodmer	6–7^{(5–7)}, 3–6
Loss	0–2	Sep 2017	Belgium F11, Damme	Clay	(Belgium) Jeroen Vanneste	7–5, 3–6, 3–6
Loss	0–3	Jan 2018	Usa F3, Naples	Clay	(Spain) Javier Martí	4–6, 0–6
Loss	0–4	Jul 2018	Germany F6, Saarlouis	Clay	(Russia) Philipp Davydenko	4–6, 6–7^{(4–7)}
Win	1–4	Aug 2018	Germany F10, Essen	Clay	(Belgium) Jeroen Vanneste	7–6^{(7–5)}, 6–4
Win	2–4	Sep 2018	Switzerland F5, Schlieren	Clay	(Switzerland) Sandro Ehrat	6–3, 6–4
Win	3–4	Sep 2018	Italy F27, Pula	Clay	(Italy) Marco Bortolotti	6–3, 5–7, 6–1
Loss	3–5	Oct 2018	Germany F16, Hamburg	Hard	(Turkey) Altug Celikbilek	2-6, 6-2, 4-6
Win	4–5	Jul 2019	M15 Marburg, Germany	Clay	(Netherlands) Jesper de Jong	7–6^{(7–4)}, 7–6^{(7–5)}
Loss	4–6	Aug 2019	M15 Überlingen, Germany	Clay	(Germany) Peter Heller	1–6, 4–6
Win	5–6	Sep 2019	M15 Horgen, Switzerland	Clay	(Colombia) Alejandro González	6–2, 6–0
Loss	5–7	Sep 2019	M25 La Marsa, Tunisia	Clay	(Brazil) Bruno Sant'Anna	5–7, 4–6
Win	6–7	Jul 2021	M25 Marburg, Germany	Clay	(Dominican Republic) Nick Hardt	4–6, 7–5, 7–6^{(7–5)}
Loss	6–8	Aug 2021	M25 Trier, Germany	Clay	(Germany) Tim Handel	2–6, 4–6
Loss	6–9	Sep 2021	M25 Madrid, Spain	Clay	(Italy) Luca Nardi	5–7, 2–6
Loss	6–10	Oct 2021	M25 Skopje, North Macedonia	Clay	(Italy) Matteo Arnaldi	1–6, 0–6
Win	7–10	May 2022	M25 Kalmar, Sweden	Clay	(Italy) Daniele Capecchi	6–2, 6–3
Win	8–10	Jul 2022	M25 Poprad, Slovakia	Clay	(Romania) Stefan Palosi	6–4, 6–3
Loss	8–11	Jul 2023	M25 Marburg, Germany	Clay	(Germany) Timo Stodder	4–6, 3–6
Loss	8–12	Sep 2023	M15 Oberhausen, Germany	Clay	(Czech Republic) Jonáš Forejtek	3–6, 4–6
Win	9–12	Sep 2023	M25 Pardubice, Czech Republic	Clay	(Czech Republic) Jonáš Forejtek	6–4, 4–6, 6–3
Loss	9–13	Aug 2024	M15 Ystad, Sweden	Clay	(Luxembourg) Chris Rodesch	2–6, 6–4, 3–6
Win	10–13	May 2025	M15 Heraklion, Greece	Hard	(Greece) Petros Tsitsipas	3–6, 7–5, 6–2
Win	11–13	Jul 2026	M25 The Hague, Netherlands	Clay	(Spain) Alejandro Juan Mano	6–1, 6–2
Loss	11–14	Aug 2026	M25 Muttenz, Switzerland	Clay	(Switzerland) Luca Stäheli	4–6, 7–5, 5–7
Win	12–14	Aug 2026	M25 Oldenzaal, Netherlands	Clay	(Ukraine) Eric Vanshelboim	7–5, 6–1

=== Doubles: 22 (11–11) ===
Finals by surface
Hard (2–2)
Clay (9–9)

Result	W–L	Date	Tournament	Surface	Partner	Opponents	Score
Win	1–0	Oct 2016	Oberhaching, Germany	Hard (i)	(Germany) Hannes Wagner	(Switzerland) Raphael Baltensperger (Switzerland) Marc-Andrea Hüsler	6–1, 6–4
Loss	1–1	Jun 2017	Kaltenkirchen, Germany	Clay	(Germany) Johannes Härteis	(Slovenia) Tom Kočevar-Dešman (Slovenia) Nik Razboršek	3–6, 2–6
Win	2–1	Aug 2017	Oldenzaal, Netherlands	Clay	(Netherlands) Scott Griekspoor	(Netherlands) Glenn Smits (Netherlands) Boy Vergeer	6–3, 6–0
Loss	2–2	Sep 2017	Hammamet, Tunisia	Clay	(France) Elliot Benchetrit	(Italy) Filippo Baldi (Italy) Mirko Cutuli	4–6, 4–6
Win	3–2	Jan 2018	Naples, United States	Clay	(United States) Trent Bryde	(Portugal) Fred Gil (Spain) Jaume Pla Malfeito	6–1, 1–6, [11–9]
Loss	3–3	May 2018	Karlskrona, Sweden	Clay	(Finland) Otto Virtanen	(Sweden) Markus Eriksson (Sweden) Fred Simonsson	1–6, 6–1, [5–10]
Win	4–3	Aug 2018	Essen, Germany	Clay	(Germany) Matthias Wunner	(Germany) Lukas Rüpke (Germany) Tom Schönenberg	6–2, 6–2
Loss	4–4	Nov 2018	Helsinki, Finland	Hard	(Finland) Otto Virtanen	(Germany) Patrick Mayer (Russia) Alexander Vasilenko	6–7^{(5–7)}, 3–6
Win	5–4	Aug 2019	Überlingen, Germany	Clay	(Germany) Valentin Günther	(Netherlands) Mick Veldheer (Germany) Leopold Zima	6–3, 6–3
Loss	5–5	Apr 2023	Reus, Spain	Clay	(Netherlands) Ryan Nijboer	(Spain) Imanol López Morillo (Spain) Benjamín Winter López	6–4, 2–6, [6–10]
Loss	5–6	Nov 2023	Sharm El Sheikh, Egypt	Hard	(Ukraine) Vadym Ursu	Ilia Simakin; Petr Bar Biryukov	6–4, 3–6, [7–10]
Loss	5–7	Aug 2024	Ystad, Sweden	Clay	(Denmark) Christian Sigsgaard	(Sweden) Erik Grevelius (Sweden) Adam Heinonen	4–6, 4–6
Win	6–7	Sep 2024	Pozzuoli, Italy	Hard	(Italy) Stefano Reitano	(United States) Henry Barrett (Poland) Filip Peliwo	6–2, 6–1
Win	7–7	Sep 2024	Satu Mare, Romania	Clay	(Germany) Tim Rühl	(Bulgaria) Petr Nesterov (Ukraine) Vladyslav Orlov	7–6^{(8–6)}, 6–3
Win	8–7	Jun 2025	Kamen, Germany	Clay	(South Africa) Alec Beckley	(Czech Republic) Jakub Jupa (Czech Republic) Jakub Nicod	6–1, 3–6, [10–6]
Loss	8–8	Aug 2025	Überlingen, Germany	Clay	(Germany) Niklas Schell	(Germany) Jannik Maute (Germany) Sydney Zick	6–7^{(3–7)}, 7–6^{(7–4)}, [8–10]
Win	9–8	May 2026	Klagenfurt, Austria	Clay	(Switzerland) Luca Stäheli	(Germany) Calvin Müller (Germany) Adrian Oetzbach	6–4, 6–3
Loss	9–9	Jun 2026	Rosbach, Germany	Clay	(Germany) Jannik Opitz	(Germany) Taym Al Azmeh (Germany) Kai Wehnelt	4–6, 4–6
Win	10–9	Jun 2026	Värnamo, Sweden	Clay	(Germany) Jannik Opitz	(Germany) Adrian Oetzbach (Denmark) Oskar Brostrøm Poulsen	6–4, 6–1
Loss	10–10	Jun 2026	Klosters, Switzerland	Clay	(Germany) Kai Wehnelt	(Switzerland) Alessandro Hunziker (Switzerland) Dominic Stricker	w/o
Loss	10–11	Aug 2026	Oldenzaal, Netherlands	Clay	(Germany) Karim Al-Amin	(Netherlands) Stijn Paardekooper (Netherlands) Fons van Sambeek	5–7, 4–6
Win	11–11	Oct 2026	Slobozia, Romania	Clay	(Germany) Jannik Opitz	(Romania) Ștefan Andreescu (Romania) Gheorghe Schinteie	6–3, 6–1
