= Koblenz Open =

- 2025 Koblenz Open

ATP Challenger Tour
- Event name: Koblenz Open
- Location: Koblenz, Germany
- Venue: CGM Arena
- Category: ATP Challenger Tour
- Surface: Hard (indoor)
- Draw: 32S/32Q/16D
- Prize money: €145,250 + H
- Website: website

The Koblenz Open is a professional tennis tournament played on indoor hardcourts. It is currently part of the ATP Challenger Tour. It is held annually in Koblenz, Germany since 2017.

== Past finals ==
=== Singles ===
Year	Champion	Runner-up	Score
2017	(Belgium) Ruben Bemelmans	(Germany) Nils Langer	6–4, 3–6, 7–6^{(7–0)}
2018	(Germany) Mats Moraing	(France) Kenny de Schepper	6–2, 6–1
2019	(Italy) Gianluca Mager	(Spain) Roberto Ortega Olmedo	2–6, 7–6^{(8–6)}, 6–2
2020	(Czech Republic) Tomáš Macháč	(Netherlands) Botic van de Zandschulp	6–3, 4–6, 6–3
2021– 2022	Not held		
2023	Roman Safiullin	(Canada) Vasek Pospisil	6–2, 7–5
2024	(Austria) Jurij Rodionov	(United States) Brandon Nakashima	6–7^{(7–9)}, 6–1, 6–2
2025	(France) Ugo Blanchet	(Italy) Luca Nardi	6–3, 3–6, 7–6^{(7–5)}
2026	Pavel Kotov	(Germany) Tom Gentzsch	6–4, 1–6, 7–6^{(10–8)}

=== Doubles ===
Year	Champions	Runners-up	Score
2017	(Chile) Hans Podlipnik (Belarus) Andrei Vasilevski	(Czech Republic) Roman Jebavý (Czech Republic) Lukáš Rosol	7–5, 3–6, [16–14]
2018	(Monaco) Romain Arneodo (Austria) Tristan-Samuel Weissborn	(Netherlands) Sander Arends (Croatia) Antonio Šančić	6–7^{(4–7)}, 7–5, [10–6]
2019	(Czech Republic) Zdeněk Kolář (Czech Republic) Adam Pavlásek	(Austria) Jürgen Melzer (Slovakia) Filip Polášek	6–3, 6–4
2020	(Netherlands) Sander Arends (1) (Netherlands) David Pel (1)	(Germany) Julian Lenz (Germany) Yannick Maden	7–6^{(7–4)}, 7–6^{(7–3)}
2021– 2022	Not held		
2023	(Germany) Fabian Fallert (Germany) Hendrik Jebens	(France) Jonathan Eysseric (Ukraine) Denys Molchanov	7–6^{(7–2)}, 6–3
2024	(Netherlands) Sander Arends (2) (Netherlands) Sem Verbeek	(Germany) Jakob Schnaitter (Germany) Mark Wallner	6–4, 6–2
2025	(Switzerland) Jakub Paul (Netherlands) David Pel (2)	(France) Geoffrey Blancaneaux (United Kingdom) Joshua Paris	walkover
2026	(Belgium) Tibo Colson (Netherlands) Thijmen Loof	(Czech Republic) Filip Duda (Serbia) Stefan Latinović	7–6^{(7–1)}, 3–6, [10–6]
