= 2021 Internazionali di Tennis Città di Forlì – Singles =

Singles
- 2021 Internazionali di Tennis Città di Forlì

Final
- Champion: (Germany) Mats Moraing
- Runner-up: (France) Quentin Halys
- Score: 3–6, 6–1, 7–5

Events
Singles	Doubles
← 2020 ·	Internazionali di Tennis Città di Forlì	· 2022 →

Lorenzo Musetti was the defending champion but chose not to defend his title.

Mats Moraing won the title after defeating Quentin Halys 3–6, 6–1, 7–5 in the final.

== Seeds ==
1. (Netherlands) Tallon Griekspoor (first round)
2. (Italy) Alessandro Giannessi (first round)
3. (Italy) Paolo Lorenzi (first round)
4. (Canada) Steven Diez (quarterfinals)
5. (Turkey) Cem İlkel (first round)
6. (Netherlands) Robin Haase (first round)
7. (Argentina) Tomás Martín Etcheverry (semifinals)
8. (France) Quentin Halys (final)

== Draw ==
=== Key ===
- Q = Qualifier
- WC = Wild card
- LL = Lucky loser
- Alt = Alternate
- SE = Special exempt
- PR = Protected ranking
- ITF = ITF entry
- JE = Junior exempt
- w/o = Walkover
- r = Retired
- d = Defaulted
- SR = Special ranking

=== Finals ===
Semifinals
8	(France) Quentin Halys	7^{7}	6
(Portugal) Gastão Elias	6^{4}	4
7	(Argentina) Tomás Martín Etcheverry	3	5
(Germany) Mats Moraing	6	7

Final
8	(France) Quentin Halys	6	1	5
(Germany) Mats Moraing	3	6	7

=== Top half ===
First round
1	(Netherlands) T Griekspoor	6	1	5
Q	(Italy) F Forti	4	6	7
Q	(Germany) Lucas Gerch	7^{8}	3	6
Q	(Argentina) TA Tirante	6^{6}	6	3
(Italy) F Baldi	3	5
(Morocco) E Benchetrit	6	7
(Germany) J Lenz	3	3
8	(France) Q Halys	6	6
3	(Italy) P Lorenzi	3	4
Alt	(Italy) R Brancaccio	6	6
(Croatia) D Ajduković	7^{7}	5	7^{7}
WC	(Italy) F Passaro	6^{2}	7	6^{4}
(Portugal) G Elias	6	6
PR	(Croatia) V Galović	3	2
Alt	(Brazil) O Luz	7	3	7
5	(Turkey) C İlkel	5	6	5

Second round
Q	(Italy) F Forti	6	6
Q	(Germany) L Gerch	4	4
(Morocco) E Benchetrit	4	5
8	(France) Q Halys	6	7
Alt	(Italy) R Brancaccio	5	6	6
(Croatia) D Ajduković	7	4	3
(Portugal) G Elias	6	7^{9}
Alt	(Brazil) O Luz	4	6^{7}

Quarterfinals
Q	(Italy) F Forti	5	3
8	(France) Q Halys	7	6
Alt	(Italy) R Brancaccio	2	3
(Portugal) G Elias	6	6

Semifinals
8	(France) Q Halys	7^{7}	6
(Portugal) G Elias	6^{4}	4

=== Bottom half ===
First round
7	(Argentina) TM Etcheverry	6	6
(Tunisia) M Jaziri	4	2
WC	(Italy) F Cobolli	6	7
(Italy) G Zeppieri	0	5
Q	(Germany) S Fanselow	2	2
(Argentina) C Ugo Carabelli	6	6
(Italy) A Arnaboldi	0^{r}
4	(Canada) S Diez	5
6	(Netherlands) R Haase	3	1
(Germany) M Moraing	6	6
(Netherlands) I Sijsling	6	7^{7}
(Italy) A Pellegrino	2	6^{5}
(Argentina) P Cachin	4	6	6
(France) H Grenier	6	4	3
WC	(Italy) J Berrettini	6	7^{7}
2	(Italy) A Giannessi	1	6^{0}

Second round
7	(Argentina) TM Etcheverry	6	4	6
WC	(Italy) F Cobolli	4	6	2
(Argentina) C Ugo Carabelli	2	6^{9}
4	(Canada) S Diez	6	7^{11}
(Germany) M Moraing	3	6	6
(Netherlands) I Sijsling	6	4	2
(Argentina) P Cachin	6^{4}	7^{7}	4
WC	(Italy) J Berrettini	7^{7}	6^{4}	6

Quarterfinals
7	(Argentina) TM Etcheverry	4	6	6
4	(Canada) S Diez	6	3	2
(Germany) M Moraing	6	6
WC	(Italy) J Berrettini	3	4

Semifinals
7	(Argentina) TM Etcheverry	3	5
(Germany) M Moraing	6	7
