= 2020 Internazionali di Tennis Città di Forlì – Doubles =

Doubles
- 2020 Internazionali di Tennis Città di Forlì

Final
- Champions: (Bosnia and Herzegovina) Tomislav Brkić (Serbia) Nikola Ćaćić
- Runners-up: (Kazakhstan) Andrey Golubev (Italy) Andrea Vavassori
- Score: 3–6, 7–5, [10–3]

Events
Singles	Doubles
Internazionali di Tennis Città di Forlì	· 2021 →

This was the first edition of the tournament.

Tomislav Brkić and Nikola Ćaćić won the title after defeating Andrey Golubev and Andrea Vavassori 3–6, 7–5, [10–3] in the final.

== Seeds ==
1. (New Zealand) Marcus Daniell / (Austria) Philipp Oswald (quarterfinals)
2. (Italy) Simone Bolelli / (Argentina) Máximo González (first round)
3. (El Salvador) Marcelo Arévalo / (United Kingdom) Jonny O'Mara (first round)
4. (Argentina) Andrés Molteni / (Monaco) Hugo Nys (first round)

== Draw ==
=== Key ===
- Q = Qualifier
- WC = Wild card
- LL = Lucky loser
- Alt = Alternate
- SE = Special exempt
- PR = Protected ranking
- ITF = ITF entry
- JE = Junior exempt
- w/o = Walkover
- r = Retired
- d = Defaulted
- SR = Special ranking

First round
1	(New Zealand) M Daniell (Austria) P Oswald	6	7^{7}
WC	(Italy) A Arnaboldi (Italy) F Baldi	4	6^{4}
Alt	(Russia) T Gabashvili (Chinese Taipei) T-h Yang	6^{5}	4
WC	(Italy) L Musetti (Italy) A Pellegrino	7^{7}	6
3	(El Salvador) M Arévalo (United Kingdom) J O'Mara	1	2
(Kazakhstan) A Golubev (Italy) A Vavassori	6	6
(Sweden) R Lindstedt (Poland) S Walków	7^{10}	7
WC	(Italy) Alessio De Bernardis (Italy) F Passaro	6^{8}	5
(Bosnia and Herzegovina) T Brkić (Serbia) N Ćaćić	6	6
(India) S Balaji (Switzerland) L Margaroli	3	2
(Monaco) R Arneodo (Kazakhstan) A Nedovyesov	1	6	[10]
4	(Argentina) A Molteni (Monaco) H Nys	6	3	[8]
(Argentina) G Durán (Spain) D Vega Hernández	2	3
(United Kingdom) L Glasspool (United Kingdom) C Norrie	6	6
(Israel) J Erlich (Belarus) A Vasilevski	4	6	[10]
2	(Italy) S Bolelli (Argentina) M González	6	3	[8]

Quarterfinals
1	(New Zealand) M Daniell (Austria) P Oswald	6^{5}	6	[5]
WC	(Italy) L Musetti (Italy) A Pellegrino	7^{7}	4	[10]
(Kazakhstan) A Golubev (Italy) A Vavassori	6	6
(Sweden) R Lindstedt (Poland) S Walków	2	4
(Bosnia and Herzegovina) T Brkić (Serbia) N Ćaćić	6	7^{7}
(Monaco) R Arneodo (Kazakhstan) A Nedovyesov	4	6^{2}
(United Kingdom) L Glasspool (United Kingdom) C Norrie
(Israel) J Erlich (Belarus) A Vasilevski	w/o

Semifinals
WC	(Italy) L Musetti (Italy) A Pellegrino
(Kazakhstan) A Golubev (Italy) A Vavassori	w/o
(Bosnia and Herzegovina) T Brkić (Serbia) N Ćaćić	7	6
(Israel) J Erlich (Belarus) A Vasilevski	5	0

Final
(Kazakhstan) A Golubev (Italy) A Vavassori	6	5	[3]
(Bosnia and Herzegovina) T Brkić (Serbia) N Ćaćić	3	7	[10]
