= 2022 Torino Challenger – Doubles =

Doubles
- 2022 Torino Challenger

Final
- Champions: (Belgium) Ruben Bemelmans (Germany) Daniel Masur
- Runners-up: (Netherlands) Sander Arends (Netherlands) David Pel
- Score: 3–6, 6–3, [10–8]

Events
Singles	Doubles
Torino Challenger	· 2023 →

This was the first edition of the tournament and the first Challenger tournament in Turin since 2011.

Ruben Bemelmans and Daniel Masur won the title after defeating Sander Arends and David Pel 3–6, 6–3, [10–8] in the final.

== Seeds ==
1. (United Kingdom) Lloyd Glasspool / (Australia) Matt Reid (quarterfinals)
2. (Czech Republic) Roman Jebavý / (Italy) Andrea Vavassori (semifinals)
3. (Netherlands) Sander Arends / (Netherlands) David Pel (final)
4. (United States) Evan King / (United States) Alex Lawson (quarterfinals)

== Draw ==
=== Key ===
- Q = Qualifier
- WC = Wild card
- LL = Lucky loser
- Alt = Alternate
- SE = Special exempt
- PR = Protected ranking
- ITF = ITF entry
- JE = Junior exempt
- w/o = Walkover
- r = Retired
- d = Defaulted
- SR = Special ranking

First round
1	(United Kingdom) L Glasspool (Australia) M Reid	7^{7}	6
WC	(Italy) Stefano Reitano (Italy) Edoardo Zanada	6^{3}	4
(Netherlands) G Brouwer (Netherlands) J Sels	7^{7}	2	[7]
(France) J Eysseric (France) Q Halys	6^{3}	6	[10]
3	(Netherlands) S Arends (Netherlands) D Pel	6	4	[10]
(United States) J Cerretani (United States) R Stalder	1	6	[4]
(India) J Nedunchezhiyan (India) P Raja	5	6	[10]
(Italy) F Agamenone (Argentina) JP Ficovich	7	2	[1]
(Romania) VV Cornea (Germany) F Fallert	6	3	[5]
(Belgium) R Bemelmans (Germany) D Masur	3	6	[10]
WC	(Italy) Gianluca Bellezza (Italy) Federico Luzzo	4	2
4	(United States) E King (United States) A Lawson	6	6
(Italy) M Bortolotti (Spain) S Martos Gornés	6^{4}	3
(India) S Balaji (Croatia) A Šančić	7^{7}	6
(France) M Guinard (France) A Olivetti	6^{3}	6^{3}
2	(Czech Republic) R Jebavý (Italy) A Vavassori	7^{7}	7^{7}

Quarterfinals
1	(United Kingdom) L Glasspool (Australia) M Reid	4	6^{7}
(France) J Eysseric (France) Q Halys	6	7^{9}
3	(Netherlands) S Arends (Netherlands) D Pel	6	6
(India) J Nedunchezhiyan (India) P Raja	3	4
(Belgium) R Bemelmans (Germany) D Masur	3	6	[10]
4	(United States) E King (United States) A Lawson	6	3	[7]
(India) S Balaji (Croatia) A Šančić	2	4
2	(Czech Republic) R Jebavý (Italy) A Vavassori	6	6

Semifinals
(France) J Eysseric (France) Q Halys	3	6^{4}
3	(Netherlands) S Arends (Netherlands) D Pel	6	7^{7}
(Belgium) R Bemelmans (Germany) D Masur	6	6
2	(Czech Republic) R Jebavý (Italy) A Vavassori	3	2

Final
3	(Netherlands) S Arends (Netherlands) D Pel	6	3	[8]
(Belgium) R Bemelmans (Germany) D Masur	3	6	[10]
