= 2022 Torino Challenger – Singles =

Singles
- 2022 Torino Challenger

Final
- Champion: (Germany) Mats Moraing
- Runner-up: (France) Quentin Halys
- Score: 7–6^{(13–11)}, 6–3

Events
Singles	Doubles
Torino Challenger	· 2023 →

This was the first edition of the tournament and the first Challenger tournament in Turin since 2011.

Mats Moraing won the title after defeating Quentin Halys 7–6^{(13–11)}, 6–3 in the final.

== Seeds ==
1. (France) Quentin Halys (final)
2. (Germany) Mats Moraing (champion)
3. (Canada) Vasek Pospisil (semifinals)
4. (Italy) Franco Agamenone (second round)
5. (Italy) Thomas Fabbiano (second round)
6. (Germany) Daniel Masur (quarterfinals)
7. (Netherlands) Tim van Rijthoven (second round)
8. (Germany) Maximilian Marterer (first round)

== Draw ==
=== Key ===
- Q = Qualifier
- WC = Wild card
- LL = Lucky loser
- Alt = Alternate
- SE = Special exempt
- PR = Protected ranking
- ITF = ITF entry
- JE = Junior exempt
- w/o = Walkover
- r = Retired
- d = Defaulted
- SR = Special ranking

=== Finals ===
Semifinals
1	(France) Quentin Halys	4	7^{7}	7^{7}
(Netherlands) Jelle Sels	6	6^{3}	6^{0}
3	(Canada) Vasek Pospisil	4	4
2	(Germany) Mats Moraing	6	6

Final
1	(France) Quentin Halys	6^{11}	3
2	(Germany) Mats Moraing	7^{13}	6

=== Top half ===
First round
1	(France) Q Halys	6	7^{7}
(Italy) A Vavassori	3	6^{5}
WC	(Italy) M Viola	6	6^{4}	2
Q	(France) A Fils	3	7^{7}	6
(Italy) G Zeppieri	6^{7}	6	6
(Italy) A Arnaboldi	7^{9}	2	4
WC	(Italy) F Maestrelli	2	4
6	(Germany) D Masur	6	6
4	(Italy) F Agamenone	6	6
(Japan) H Moriya	4	4
(United States) M Mmoh	6	6
(China) Zh Zhang	1	2
WC	(Italy) Luca Potenza	1	4
(Netherlands) J Sels	6	6
(Belgium) R Bemelmans	7	3	6^{5}
5	(Italy) T Fabbiano	5	6	7^{7}

Second round
1	(France) Q Halys	6^{5}	7^{7}	6
Q	(France) A Fils	7^{7}	6^{5}	4
(Italy) G Zeppieri	5	5
6	(Germany) D Masur	7	7
4	(Italy) F Agamenone	2	4
(United States) M Mmoh	6	6
(Netherlands) J Sels	4	6	6
5	(Italy) T Fabbiano	6	3	4

Quarterfinals
1	(France) Q Halys	7	6
6	(Germany) D Masur	5	1
(United States) M Mmoh	6^{7}	5
(Netherlands) J Sels	7^{9}	7

Semifinals
1	(France) Q Halys	4	7^{7}	7^{7}
(Netherlands) J Sels	6	6^{3}	6^{0}

=== Bottom half ===
First round
8	(Germany) M Marterer	6^{8}	5
Q	(United Kingdom) R Peniston	7^{10}	7
(Germany) J Lenz	0	6^{6}
Q	(France) A Escoffier	6	7^{8}
(United States) U Blanch	6	6
LL	(France) J Eysseric	4	1
Q	(Belgium) M Geerts	3	4
3	(Canada) V Pospisil	6	6
7	(Netherlands) T van Rijthoven	6	6
(Germany) T Kamke	3	1
(Italy) L Nardi	2	6^{3}
Q	(Romania) FC Jianu	6	7^{7}
(Argentina) JP Ficovich	5	2
Q	(Netherlands) G Brouwer	7	6
(France) M Guinard	4	6	4
2	(Germany) M Moraing	6	2	6

Second round
Q	(United Kingdom) R Peniston	5	2
Q	(France) A Escoffier	7	6
(United States) U Blanch	3	6	3
3	(Canada) V Pospisil	6	3	6
7	(Netherlands) T van Rijthoven	7^{7}	6^{3}	2
Q	(Romania) FC Jianu	6^{4}	7^{7}	6
Q	(Netherlands) G Brouwer	4	4
2	(Germany) M Moraing	6	6

Quarterfinals
Q	(France) A Escoffier	6^{4}	4
3	(Canada) V Pospisil	7^{7}	6
Q	(Romania) FC Jianu	4	3
2	(Germany) M Moraing	6	6

Semifinals
3	(Canada) V Pospisil	4	4
2	(Germany) M Moraing	6	6
