= 2026 Generali Open Kitzbühel =

- Date: 20–25 July
- Edition: 82nd
- Category: ATP 250 series
- Surface: Clay / Outdoor
- Location: Kitzbühel, Austria
- Venue: Tennis Stadium Kitzbühel

Champions

Singles
- (France) Quentin Halys

Doubles
- (Austria) Lucas Miedler / (Australia) Marc Polmans
- Generali Open Kitzbühel

The 2026 Generali Open Kitzbühel was a tennis tournament played on outdoor clay courts. It was the 82nd edition of the tournament and part of the ATP 250 tournaments on the 2026 ATP Tour. It took place at the Tennis Stadium Kitzbühel in Kitzbühel, Austria, from 20 through 25 July 2026.

== Champions ==
=== Singles ===
- (France) Quentin Halys def. (Kazakhstan) Alexander Bublik, 6–4, 7–6^{(8–6)}

=== Doubles ===
- (Austria) Lucas Miedler / (Australia) Marc Polmans def. (Germany) Jakob Schnaitter / (Germany) Mark Wallner, 6–2, 6–2

== Singles main draw entrants ==
=== Seeds ===
Country	Player	Rank^{1}	Seed
KAZ	Alexander Bublik	11	1
MON	Valentin Vacherot	21	2
FRA	Arthur Rinderknech	28	3
ARG	Tomás Martín Etcheverry	30	4
PER	Ignacio Buse	33	5
GER	Jan-Lennard Struff	41	6
BEL	Raphaël Collignon	42	7
ARG	Juan Manuel Cerúndolo	45	8

- ^{1} Rankings are as of 13 July 2026.

=== Other entrants ===
The following players received wildcards into the main draw:

- (France) Alexandre Müller
- (Austria) Lukas Neumayer
- (Austria) Joel Schwärzler

The following players received entry from the qualifying draw:

- (Italy) Federico Cinà
- (Serbia) Laslo Djere
- (Switzerland) Kilian Feldbausch
- (Austria) Jurij Rodionov

=== Withdrawals ===
- (Italy) Mattia Bellucci → replaced by (Paraguay) Adolfo Daniel Vallejo
- (Italy) Matteo Berrettini → replaced by (Kazakhstan) Alexander Shevchenko
- (Italy) Flavio Cobolli → replaced by (Argentina) Marco Trungelliti
- (Spain) Jaume Munar → replaced by (Germany) Jan-Lennard Struff
- (Argentina) Thiago Agustín Tirante → replaced by (Argentina) Facundo Díaz Acosta

== Doubles main draw entrants ==
=== Seeds ===
Country	Player	Country	Player	Rank^{1}	Seed
FRA	Pierre-Hugues Herbert	GER	Kevin Krawietz	44	1
AUT	Lucas Miedler	AUS	Marc Polmans	48	2
GER	Jakob Schnaitter	GER	Mark Wallner	70	3
CZE	Petr Nouza	AUT	Neil Oberleitner	76	4

- ^{1} Rankings as of 13 July 2026.

=== Other entrants ===
The following pairs received wildcards into the doubles main draw:

- (Austria) Nico Hipfl / (Austria) Sandro Kopp
- (Austria) Lukas Neumayer / (Austria) Joel Schwärzler
