= 2021 Internazionali di Tennis Città di Forlì =

- Date: 14–20 June
- Edition: 2nd
- Draw: 32S / 16D
- Surface: Clay
- Location: Forlì, Italy

Champions

Singles
- (Germany) Mats Moraing

Doubles
- (Peru) Sergio Galdós / (Brazil) Orlando Luz
← 2020 ·	Internazionali di Tennis Città di Forlì	· 2022 →

The 2021 Internazionali di Tennis Città di Forlì was a professional tennis tournament played on clay courts. It was the second edition of the tournament which was part of the 2021 ATP Challenger Tour. It took place in Forlì, Italy between 14 and 20 June 2021.

== Singles main-draw entrants ==
=== Seeds ===
Country	Player	Rank^{1}	Seed
NED	Tallon Griekspoor	131	1
ITA	Alessandro Giannessi	159	2
ITA	Paolo Lorenzi	167	3
CAN	Steven Diez	190	4
TUR	Cem İlkel	199	5
NED	Robin Haase	205	6
ARG	Tomás Martín Etcheverry	220	7
FRA	Quentin Halys	223	8

- ^{1} Rankings as of 31 May 2021.

=== Other entrants ===
The following players received wildcards into the singles main draw:

- (Italy) Jacopo Berrettini
- (Italy) Flavio Cobolli
- (Italy) Francesco Passaro

The following player received entry into the singles main draw using a protected ranking:

- (Croatia) Viktor Galović

The following players received entry into the singles main draw as alternates:

- (Italy) Raúl Brancaccio
- (Brazil) Orlando Luz

The following players received entry from the qualifying draw:

- (Germany) Sebastian Fanselow
- (Italy) Francesco Forti
- (Germany) Lucas Gerch
- (Argentina) Thiago Agustín Tirante

== Champions ==
=== Singles ===
- (Germany) Mats Moraing def. (France) Quentin Halys 3–6, 6–1, 7–5.

=== Doubles ===
- (Peru) Sergio Galdós / (Brazil) Orlando Luz def. (Argentina) Pedro Cachin / (Argentina) Camilo Ugo Carabelli 7–5, 2–6, [10–8].
