= 2020 Internazionali di Tennis Città di Forlì – Singles =

Singles
- 2020 Internazionali di Tennis Città di Forlì

Final
- Champion: (Italy) Lorenzo Musetti
- Runner-up: (Brazil) Thiago Monteiro
- Score: 7–6^{(7–2)}, 7–6^{(7–5)}

Events
Singles	Doubles
- Internazionali di Tennis Città di Forlì

This was the first edition of the tournament.

Lorenzo Musetti won the title after defeating Thiago Monteiro 7–6^{(7–2)}, 7–6^{(7–5)} in the final.

== Seeds ==
1. (United States) Frances Tiafoe (second round)
2. (United Kingdom) Cameron Norrie (second round)
3. (South Korea) Kwon Soon-woo (withdrew)
4. (Italy) Salvatore Caruso (quarterfinals)
5. (Japan) Yūichi Sugita (first round)
6. (South Africa) Lloyd Harris (semifinals, retired)
7. (Italy) Andreas Seppi (quarterfinals)
8. (Argentina) Federico Coria (second round)

== Draw ==
Key

- Q = Qualifier
- WC = Wild card
- LL = Lucky loser
- Alt = Alternate
- ITF = ITF entry
- PR = Protected ranking
- SR = Special ranking
- SE = Special exempt
- JE = Junior exempt
- JR = Junior Accelerator Programme entrant
- CO = College Accelerator Programme entrant
- NG = Next Gen Accelerator Program entrant
- w/o = Walkover
- r = Retired
- d = Defaulted

=== Finals ===
Semifinals
WC	(Italy) Lorenzo Musetti	4	6	4
6	(South Africa) Lloyd Harris	6	0	1^{r}
Q	(Brazil) Thiago Monteiro	6	4	6
(Italy) Andrea Pellegrino	4	6	1

Final
WC	(Italy) Lorenzo Musetti	7^{7}	7^{7}
Q	(Brazil) Thiago Monteiro	6^{2}	6^{5}

=== Top half ===
First round
1/WC	(United States) F Tiafoe	6	6
(Chinese Taipei) T-h Yang	3	0
(Russia) T Gabashvili	2	4
WC	(Italy) L Musetti	6	6
(Brazil) T Bellucci	6	6
(France) E Benchetrit	4	2
(France) Jules Okala	6^{5}	2
7	(Italy) A Seppi	7^{7}	6
4/WC	(Italy) S Caruso	7^{8}	7^{9}
Q	(Spain) N Sánchez Izquierdo	6^{6}	6^{7}
(Netherlands) T van Rijthoven	3	7	3
(Czech Republic) M Vrbenský	6	5	6
(Italy) F Baldi	2	6	5
(United States) B Fratangelo	6	3	7
(Italy) A Arnaboldi	6^{4}	6	6^{4}
6	(South Africa) L Harris	7^{7}	1	7^{7}

Second round
1/WC	(United States) F Tiafoe	4	7	2
WC	(Italy) L Musetti	6	5	6
(Brazil) T Bellucci	5	3
7	(Italy) A Seppi	7	6
4/WC	(Italy) S Caruso	7	7
(Czech Republic) M Vrbenský	5	5
(United States) B Fratangelo	6^{6}	4
6	(South Africa) L Harris	7^{8}	6

Quarterfinals
WC	(Italy) L Musetti	6	6
7	(Italy) A Seppi	3	1
4/WC	(Italy) S Caruso	6^{1}	5
6	(South Africa) L Harris	7^{7}	7

Semifinals
WC	(Italy) L Musetti	4	6	4
6	(South Africa) L Harris	6	0	1^{r}

=== Bottom half ===
First round
5	(Japan) Y Sugita	1	6^{2}
Q	(Brazil) T Monteiro	6	7^{7}
(Italy) R Bonadio	6	6
Q	(Italy) G Zeppieri	3	3
(Italy) A Vavassori	6	6^{5}	3
(Brazil) P Sakamoto	4	7^{7}	6
(Australia) D Kelly	7^{11}	4	4
LL	(United States) A Ritschard	6^{9}	6	6
8	(Argentina) F Coria	7	3	4
(Chinese Taipei) C-h Tseng	5	6	2^{r}
(Brazil) G Clezar	7^{10}	3	6
(Germany) M Bachinger	6^{8}	6	3
(Italy) A Pellegrino	6	6
(Croatia) V Galović	4	4
Q	(United States) C Harrison	5	6	4
2	(United Kingdom) C Norrie	7	3	6

Second round
Q	(Brazil) T Monteiro	2	7^{7}	6
(Italy) R Bonadio	6	6^{2}	4
(Brazil) P Sakamoto	7	3	1
LL	(United States) A Ritschard	5	6	6
8	(Argentina) F Coria	6^{6}	7^{7}	4
(Brazil) G Clezar	7^{8}	6^{4}	6
(Italy) A Pellegrino	6	6
2	(United Kingdom) C Norrie	2	4

Quarterfinals
Q	(Brazil) T Monteiro	7^{7}	6
LL	(United States) A Ritschard	6^{4}	3
(Brazil) G Clezar	4	2
(Italy) A Pellegrino	6	6

Semifinals
Q	(Brazil) T Monteiro	6	4	6
(Italy) A Pellegrino	4	6	1
