= 2021 Internazionali di Tennis Città di Forlì – Doubles =

Doubles
- 2021 Internazionali di Tennis Città di Forlì

Final
- Champions: (Peru) Sergio Galdós (Brazil) Orlando Luz
- Runners-up: (Argentina) Pedro Cachin (Argentina) Camilo Ugo Carabelli
- Score: 7–5, 2–6, [10–8]

Events
Singles	Doubles
- Internazionali di Tennis Città di Forlì

Tomislav Brkić and Nikola Ćaćić were the defending champions but chose not to defend their title.

Sergio Galdós and Orlando Luz won the title after defeating Pedro Cachin and Camilo Ugo Carabelli 7–5, 2–6, [10–8] in the final.

== Seeds ==
1. (Peru) Sergio Galdós / (Brazil) Orlando Luz (champions)
2. (Italy) Marco Bortolotti / (Zimbabwe) Benjamin Lock (semifinals)
3. (Morocco) Elliot Benchetrit / (Tunisia) Malek Jaziri (first round, withdrew)
4. (Germany) Julian Lenz / (Germany) Mats Moraing (semifinals)

== Draw ==
Key

- Q = Qualifier
- WC = Wild card
- LL = Lucky loser
- Alt = Alternate
- ITF = ITF entry
- PR = Protected ranking
- SR = Special ranking
- SE = Special exempt
- JE = Junior exempt
- JR = Junior Accelerator Programme entrant
- CO = College Accelerator Programme entrant
- NG = Next Gen Accelerator Program entrant
- w/o = Walkover
- r = Retired
- d = Defaulted

First round
(Croatia) D Ajduković (Bosnia and Herzegovina) N Fatić	1	6	[2]
(Germany) S Fanselow (Germany) Lucas Gerch	6	3	[10]
4	(Germany) J Lenz (Germany) M Moraing	4	7^{7}	[10]
(Netherlands) I Sijsling (Netherlands) G Smits	6	6^{2}	[1]
(Italy) F Forti (Italy) G Zeppieri	3	6	[10]
(Netherlands) M Hermans (Netherlands) B Stevens	6	3	[6]
WC	(Italy) Lorenzo Angelini (Italy) Michele Vianello	2	2
(Argentina) P Cachin (Argentina) C Ugo Carabelli	6	6
WC	(Italy) Daniele Chiurulli (Italy) Lorenzo Claverie	w/o
3	(Morocco) E Benchetrit (Tunisia) M Jaziri
(Italy) A Bega (Italy) J Berrettini	3	6	[11]
WC	(Italy) Alessio De Bernardis (Italy) F Passaro	6	2	[9]

Quarterfinals
1	(Peru) S Galdós (Brazil) O Luz	7	6
(Germany) S Fanselow (Germany) L Gerch	5	4
4	(Germany) J Lenz (Germany) M Moraing	3	6	[10]
(Italy) F Forti (Italy) G Zeppieri	6	4	[7]
(Argentina) P Cachin (Argentina) C Ugo Carabelli	6	7^{7}
WC	(Italy) D Chiurulli (Italy) L Claverie	2	6^{3}
(Italy) A Bega (Italy) J Berrettini	4	6^{6}
2	(Italy) M Bortolotti (Zimbabwe) B Lock	6	7^{8}

Semifinals
1	(Peru) S Galdós (Brazil) O Luz	7	7^{7}
4	(Germany) J Lenz (Germany) M Moraing	5	6^{3}
(Argentina) P Cachin (Argentina) C Ugo Carabelli	7^{7}	2	[11]
2	(Italy) M Bortolotti (Zimbabwe) B Lock	6^{5}	6	[9]

Final
1	(Peru) S Galdós (Brazil) O Luz	7	2	[10]
(Argentina) P Cachin (Argentina) C Ugo Carabelli	5	6	[8]
