= 2022 Torino Challenger =

- Date: 28 February – 6 March
- Edition: 1st
- Surface: Hard (indoor)
- Location: Turin, Italy

Champions

Singles
- (Germany) Mats Moraing

Doubles
- (Belgium) Ruben Bemelmans / (Germany) Daniel Masur
Torino Challenger	· 2023 →

The 2022 Torino Challenger was a professional tennis tournament played on hardcourts. It was the first edition of the tournament which was part of the 2022 ATP Challenger Tour. It took place in Turin, Italy between 28 February and 6 March 2022.

== Singles main draw entrants ==
=== Seeds ===
Country	Player	Rank^{1}	Seed
FRA	Quentin Halys	142	1
GER	Mats Moraing	149	2
CAN	Vasek Pospisil	155	3
ITA	Franco Agamenone	174	4
ITA	Thomas Fabbiano	183	5
GER	Daniel Masur	195	6
NED	Tim van Rijthoven	200	7
GER	Maximilian Marterer	201	8

- ^{1} Rankings as of 21 February 2022.

=== Other entrants ===
The following players received wildcards into the singles main draw:

- (Italy) Francesco Maestrelli
- (Italy) Luca Potenza
- (Italy) Matteo Viola

The following players received entry from the qualifying draw:

- (Netherlands) Gijs Brouwer
- (France) Antoine Escoffier
- (France) Arthur Fils
- (Belgium) Michael Geerts
- (Romania) Filip Jianu
- (United Kingdom) Ryan Peniston

The following player received entry as a lucky loser:

- (France) Jonathan Eysseric

== Champions ==
=== Singles ===
- (Germany) Mats Moraing def. (France) Quentin Halys 7–6^{(13–11)}, 6–3.

=== Doubles ===
- (Belgium) Ruben Bemelmans / (Germany) Daniel Masur def. (Netherlands) Sander Arends / (Netherlands) David Pel 3–6, 6–3, [10–8].
