= 2026 Generali Open Kitzbühel – Singles =

Singles
- 2026 Generali Open Kitzbühel

Final
- Champion: (France) Quentin Halys
- Runner-up: (Kazakhstan) Alexander Bublik
- Score: 6–4, 7–6^{(8–6)}

Details
- Draw: 28 (4Q / 3WC)
- Seeds: 8

Events
Singles	Doubles
- Generali Open Kitzbühel

Quentin Halys defeated defending champion Alexander Bublik in the final, 6–4, 7–6^{(8–6)} to win the singles tennis title at the 2026 Austrian Open Kitzbühel. He did not lose a set en route to his first ATP Tour title. Halys is the first Frenchman to win the tournament in the Open Era.

== Seeds ==
The top four seeds received a bye into the second round.

1. (Kazakhstan) Alexander Bublik (final)
2. (Monaco) Valentin Vacherot (second round)
3. (France) Arthur Rinderknech (second round)
4. (Argentina) Tomás Martín Etcheverry (semifinals)
5. (Peru) Ignacio Buse (quarterfinals)
6. (Germany) Jan-Lennard Struff (second round)
7. (Belgium) Raphaël Collignon (first round)
8. (Argentina) Juan Manuel Cerúndolo (first round)

== Draw ==
Key

- Q = Qualifier
- WC = Wild card
- LL = Lucky loser
- Alt = Alternate
- ITF = ITF entry
- PR = Protected ranking
- SR = Special ranking
- SE = Special exempt
- JE = Junior exempt
- JR = Junior Accelerator Programme entrant
- CO = College Accelerator Programme entrant
- NG = Next Gen Accelerator Program entrant
- w/o = Walkover
- r = Retired
- d = Defaulted

=== Finals ===
Semifinals
1	(Kazakhstan) Alexander Bublik	6	6
4	(Argentina) Tomás Martín Etcheverry	3	4
(Germany) Yannick Hanfmann	4	6^{2}
(France) Quentin Halys	6	7^{7}

Final
1	(Kazakhstan) Alexander Bublik	4	6^{6}
(France) Quentin Halys	6	7^{8}

=== Top half ===
First round
(Argentina) F Díaz Acosta	4	6	6
Q	(Italy) F Cinà	6	3	4
(Slovakia) A Molčan	6	6
(Austria) S Ofner	4	4
(Germany) D Altmaier	6	6
7	(Belgium) R Collignon	3	2
WC	(Austria) J Schwärzler	4	2
Q	(Austria) J Rodionov	6	6
(Paraguay) AD Vallejo	6^{2}	1
Q	(Switzerland) K Feldbausch	7^{7}	6
(Czech Republic) V Kopřiva	5	7^{7}	1
5	(Peru) I Buse	7	6^{3}	6

Second round
1	(Kazakhstan) A Bublik	6	7
(Argentina) F Díaz Acosta	3	5
(Slovakia) A Molčan	6	3	7
(Germany) D Altmaier	3	6	5
4	(Argentina) TM Etcheverry	6	7^{7}
Q	(Austria) J Rodionov	2	6^{4}
Q	(Switzerland) K Feldbausch	6	2	2
5	(Peru) I Buse	2	6	6

Quarterfinals
1	(Kazakhstan) A Bublik	6	6
(Slovakia) A Molčan	3	2
4	(Argentina) TM Etcheverry	6	7
5	(Peru) I Buse	2	5

Semifinals
1	(Kazakhstan) A Bublik	6	6
4	(Argentina) TM Etcheverry	3	4

=== Bottom half ===
First round
8	(Argentina) JM Cerúndolo	2	1
(Argentina) M Trungelliti	6	6
WC	(Austria) L Neumayer	6^{5}	4
(Germany) Y Hanfmann	7^{7}	6
(Argentina) S Báez	6	3	6
(Serbia) M Kecmanović	3	6	4
6	(Germany) J-L Struff	3	7^{7}	6
(Kazakhstan) A Shevchenko	6	6^{5}	4
WC	(France) A Müller	4	0
(Argentina) M Navone	6	6
Q	(Serbia) L Djere	6^{4}	4
(France) Q Halys	7^{7}	6

Second round
(Argentina) M Trungelliti	4	6^{2}
(Germany) Y Hanfmann	6	7^{7}
(Argentina) S Báez	7^{8}	2	6
3	(France) A Rinderknech	6^{6}	6	4
6	(Germany) J-L Struff	0	3
(Argentina) M Navone	6	6
(France) Q Halys	6	6
2	(Monaco) V Vacherot	3	4

Quarterfinals
(Germany) Y Hanfmann	6	6
(Argentina) S Báez	3	1
(Argentina) M Navone	5	3
(France) Q Halys	7	6

Semifinals
(Germany) Y Hanfmann	4	6^{2}
(France) Q Halys	6	7^{7}

== Qualifying ==
=== Seeds ===
1. (Brazil) Gustavo Heide (first round)
2. (Austria) Jurij Rodionov (qualified)
3. (Bolivia) Hugo Dellien (qualifying competition)
4. (Italy) Federico Cinà (qualified)
5. (Ukraine) Vitaliy Sachko (qualifying competition)
6. (Italy) Lorenzo Giustino (qualifying competition)
7. (Serbia) Laslo Djere (qualified)
8. (France) Pierre-Hugues Herbert (first round)

=== Qualifiers ===
1. (Switzerland) Kilian Feldbausch
2. (Austria) Jurij Rodionov
3. (Serbia) Laslo Djere
4. (Italy) Federico Cinà

=== Qualifying draw ===
==== First qualifier ====
First round
1	(Brazil) Gustavo Heide	4	2
(Switzerland) Kilian Feldbausch	6	6
(Austria) Sandro Kopp	6	6
8	(France) Pierre-Hugues Herbert	4	4

Qualifying competition
(Switzerland) Kilian Feldbausch	6	6
(Austria) Sandro Kopp	0	4

==== Second qualifier ====
First round
2	(Austria) Jurij Rodionov	6	6
Alt	Andrey Chepelev	2	2
PR	(Argentina) Federico Coria	6^{5}	2
5	(Ukraine) Vitaliy Sachko	7^{7}	6

Qualifying competition
2	(Austria) Jurij Rodionov	6	7^{7}
5	(Ukraine) Vitaliy Sachko	4	6^{4}

==== Third qualifier ====
First round
3	(Bolivia) Hugo Dellien	4	6	6
(Italy) Michele Ribecai	6	1	3
WC	(Austria) Niklas Waldner	2	4
7	(Serbia) Laslo Djere	6	6

Qualifying competition
3	(Bolivia) Hugo Dellien	5	2
7	(Serbia) Laslo Djere	7	6

==== Fourth qualifier ====
First round
4	(Italy) Federico Cinà	6	3	6
(Poland) Daniel Michalski	2	6	1
WC	(Austria) Nico Hipfl	2	4
6	(Italy) Lorenzo Giustino	6	6

Qualifying competition
4	(Italy) Federico Cinà	6	6
6	(Italy) Lorenzo Giustino	4	2
