= 2026 Generali Open Kitzbühel – Doubles =

Doubles
- 2026 Generali Open Kitzbühel

Final
- Champions: (Austria) Lucas Miedler (Australia) Marc Polmans
- Runners-up: (Germany) Jakob Schnaitter (Germany) Mark Wallner
- Score: 6–2, 6–2

Events
Singles	Doubles
- Generali Open Kitzbühel

Lucas Miedler and Marc Polmans defeated Jakob Schnaitter and Mark Wallner in the final, 6–2, 6–2 to win the doubles tennis title at the 2026 Austrian Open Kitzbühel. It was their second title in as many weeks, following Gstaad.

Petr Nouza and Patrik Rikl were the reigning champions, but chose not to compete together this year. Nouza partnered Neil Oberleitner, but lost in the first round to Constantin Frantzen and Robin Haase. Rikl partnered Adam Pavlásek, but lost in the first round to Miedler and Polmans.

== Seeds ==
1. (France) Pierre-Hugues Herbert / (Germany) Kevin Krawietz (semifinals)
2. (Austria) Lucas Miedler / (Australia) Marc Polmans (champions)
3. (Germany) Jakob Schnaitter / (Germany) Mark Wallner (final)
4. (Czech Republic) Petr Nouza / (Austria) Neil Oberleitner (first round)

== Draw ==
Key

- Q = Qualifier
- WC = Wild card
- LL = Lucky loser
- Alt = Alternate
- ITF = ITF entry
- PR = Protected ranking
- SR = Special ranking
- SE = Special exempt
- JE = Junior exempt
- JR = Junior Accelerator Programme entrant
- CO = College Accelerator Programme entrant
- NG = Next Gen Accelerator Program entrant
- w/o = Walkover
- r = Retired
- d = Defaulted

=== Draw ===
First round
1	(France) P-H Herbert (Germany) K Krawietz	4	7	[10]
(Switzerland) J Paul (United States) R Seggerman	6	5	[8]
(Brazil) F Romboli (Australia) J-P Smith	4	5
WC	(Austria) L Neumayer (Austria) J Schwärzler	6	7
3	(Germany) J Schnaitter (Germany) M Wallner	7^{8}	6
(Germany) H Jebens (Czech Republic) M Vocel	6^{6}	4
(Belgium) S Gillé (Netherlands) S Verbeek	6^{4}	7^{7}	[13]
(Argentina) A Molteni (United States) P Trhac	7^{7}	6^{4}	[15]
(Argentina) TM Etcheverry (Argentina) M Kestelboim	6^{5}	7^{7}	[2]
(India) S Balaji (Sweden) A Göransson	7^{7}	6^{5}	[10]
(Germany) C Frantzen (Netherlands) R Haase	2	7	[10]
4	(Czech Republic) P Nouza (Austria) N Oberleitner	6	5	[7]
WC	(Austria) N Hipfl (Austria) S Kopp	5	3
(Netherlands) J-J Rojer (United States) T Winegar	7	6
(Czech Republic) A Pavlásek (Czech Republic) P Rikl	3	6^{5}
2	(Austria) L Miedler (Australia) M Polmans	6	7^{7}

Quarterfinals
1	(France) P-H Herbert (Germany) K Krawietz	6	6
WC	(Austria) L Neumayer (Austria) J Schwärzler	3	4
3	(Germany) J Schnaitter (Germany) M Wallner	6	6
(Argentina) A Molteni (United States) P Trhac	3	2
(India) S Balaji (Sweden) A Göransson	6	7^{9}
(Germany) C Frantzen (Netherlands) R Haase	4	6^{7}
(Netherlands) J-J Rojer (United States) T Winegar	2	7^{7}	[12]
2	(Austria) L Miedler (Australia) M Polmans	6	6^{2}	[14]

Semifinals
1	(France) P-H Herbert (Germany) K Krawietz	2	6	[8]
3	(Germany) J Schnaitter (Germany) M Wallner	6	2	[10]
(India) S Balaji (Sweden) A Göransson	4	7^{7}	[7]
2	(Austria) L Miedler (Australia) M Polmans	6	6^{4}	[10]

Final
3	(Germany) J Schnaitter (Germany) M Wallner	2	2
2	(Austria) L Miedler (Australia) M Polmans	6	6
