= 2020 Internazionali di Tennis Città di Forlì =

- Date: 21–27 September
- Edition: 1st
- Draw: 32S / 16D
- Surface: Clay
- Location: Forlì, Italy

Champions

Singles
- (Italy) Lorenzo Musetti

Doubles
- (Bosnia and Herzegovina) Tomislav Brkić / (Serbia) Nikola Ćaćić
Internazionali di Tennis Città di Forlì	· 2021 →

The 2020 Internazionali di Tennis Città di Forlì was a professional tennis tournament played on clay courts. It was the first edition of the tournament which was part of the 2020 ATP Challenger Tour. It took place in Forlì, Italy between 21 and 27 September 2020.

== Singles main-draw entrants ==
=== Seeds ===
Country	Player	Rank^{1}	Seed
USA	Frances Tiafoe	66	1
GBR	Cameron Norrie	68	2
~~KOR~~	~~Kwon Soon-woo~~	~~79~~	~~3~~
ITA	Salvatore Caruso	87	4
JPN	Yūichi Sugita	94	5
RSA	Lloyd Harris	95	6
ITA	Andreas Seppi	96	7
ARG	Federico Coria	104	8

- ^{1} Rankings as of 14 September 2020.

=== Other entrants ===
The following players received wildcards into the singles main draw:

- (Italy) Salvatore Caruso
- (Italy) Lorenzo Musetti
- (United States) Frances Tiafoe

The following players received entry from the qualifying draw:

- (United States) Christian Harrison
- (Brazil) Thiago Monteiro
- (Spain) Nikolás Sánchez Izquierdo
- (Italy) Giulio Zeppieri

The following player received entry as a lucky loser:

- (United States) Alexander Ritschard

== Champions ==
=== Singles ===
- (Italy) Lorenzo Musetti def. (Brazil) Thiago Monteiro 7–6^{(7–2)}, 7–6^{(7–5)}.

=== Doubles ===
- (Bosnia and Herzegovina) Tomislav Brkić / (Serbia) Nikola Ćaćić def. (Kazakhstan) Andrey Golubev / (Italy) Andrea Vavassori 3–6, 7–5, [10–3].
