= Torino Challenger =

- 2022 Torino Challenger

ATP Challenger Tour
- Event name: Torino Challenger
- Location: Turin, Italy
- Venue: Circolo della Stampa Sporting
- Category: ATP Challenger 80
- Surface: Hard (indoor)
- Draw: 32S/24Q/16D
- Prize money: $ 53,120
- Website: sporting.to.it

Current champions (2022)
- Singles: (Germany) Mats Moraing
- Doubles: (Belgium) Ruben Bemelmans (Germany) Daniel Masur

The Torino Challenger was a professional tennis tournament played on indoor hardcourts. It was part of the ATP Challenger Tour and was held in Turin, Italy in 2022. It was organized by NEN Events.

== Past finals ==
=== Singles ===
Year	Champion	Runner-up	Score
2022	(Germany) Mats Moraing	(France) Quentin Halys	7–6^{(13–11)}, 6–3

=== Doubles ===
Year	Champions	Runners-up	Score
2022	(Belgium) Ruben Bemelmans (Germany) Daniel Masur	(Netherlands) Sander Arends (Netherlands) David Pel	3–6, 6–3, [10–8]
