= Quentin Halys =

French tennis player (born 1996)

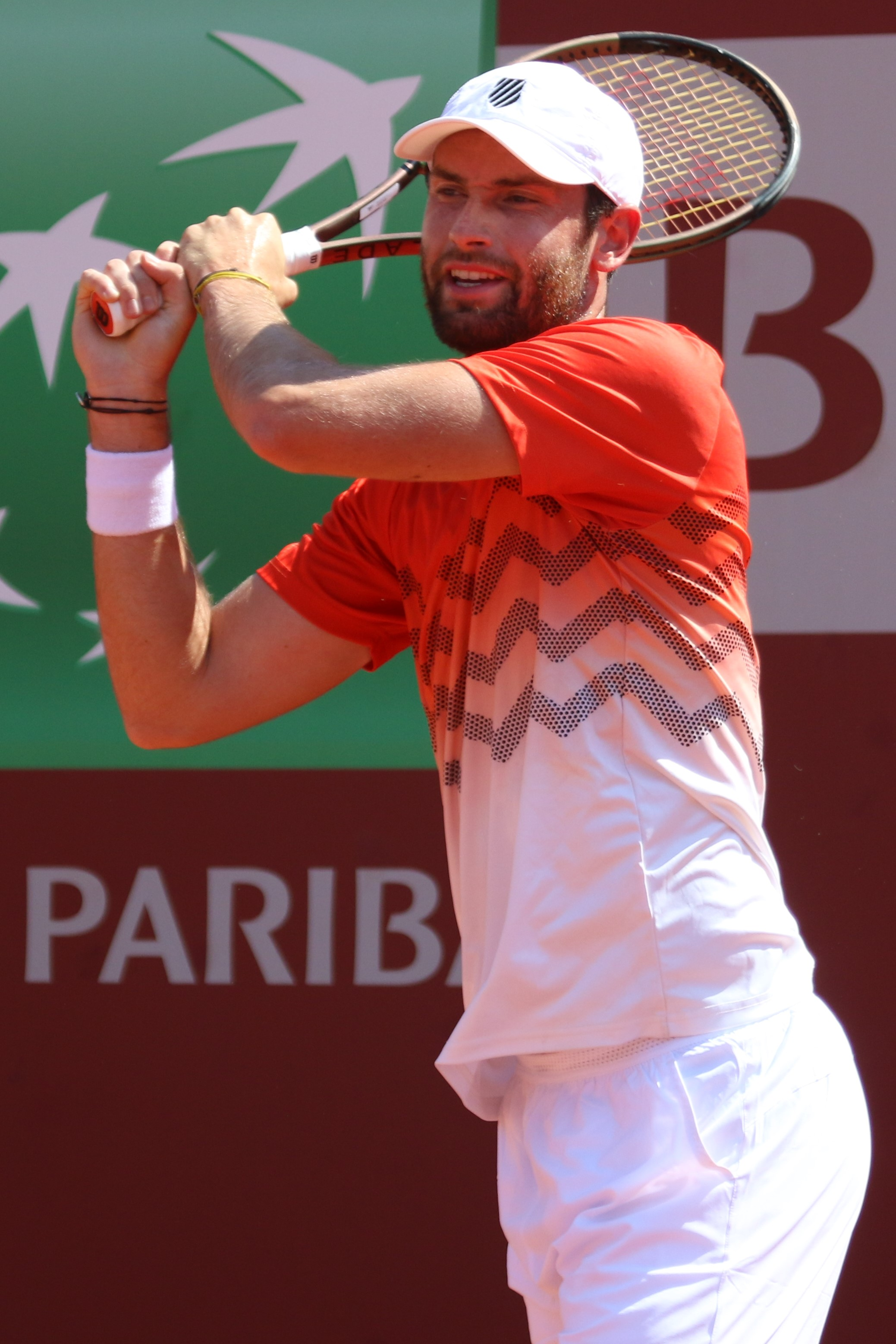
- Halys at the 2022 BNP Paribas Primrose Bordeaux
- Country (sports): France
- Residence: Boulogne-Billancourt, France
- Born: 26 October 1996 (age 30) Bondy, France
- Height: 1.91 m (6 ft 3 in)
- Turned pro: 2012
- Plays: Right-handed (two handed-backhand)
- Coach: Nicolas Devilder, Olivier Malcor
- Prize money: US $6,942,871

Singles
- Career record: 73–109
- Career titles: 1
- Highest ranking: No. 45 (26 October 2026)
- Current ranking: No. 45 (9 November 2026)

Grand Slam singles results
- Australian Open: 2R (2016, 2024, 2025, 2026)
- French Open: 3R (2025, 2026)
- Wimbledon: 3R (2023, 2024)
- US Open: 2R (2026)

Doubles
- Career record: 34–42
- Career titles: 2
- Highest ranking: No. 37 (9 November 2026)
- Current ranking: No. 37 (9 November 2026)

Grand Slam doubles results
- Australian Open: 2R (2024)
- French Open: SF (2026)
- Wimbledon: 1R (2016, 2022, 2023, 2025, 2026)
- US Open: 3R (2022)
- Last updated on: 9 November 2026.

Quentin Halys (French pronunciation: [kɑ̃tɛ̃ alis]; born 26 October 1996) is a French professional tennis player. He has a career-high ATP singles ranking of world No. 45 achieved on 26 October 2026 and a best doubles ranking of No. 37, reached on 9 November 2026.

Halys has won one ATP Tour singles title, at the 2026 Generali Open. He also earned two trophies in doubles, including a Masters 1000 title at the 2026 Paris Masters.

== Juniors ==
Halys reached four Junior Grand Slam finals, three in doubles and one in singles. Of the four finals, Halys won the 2014 French Open partnering Benjamin Bonzi. He reached a career high combined (singles and doubles) of World No. 3 on March 31, 2014. He ended his junior career with a 98–44 record on singles and 83–35 on doubles.

=== 2010 ===
Quentin played in his first ITF Junior Circuit tournament in 2010 at the G4 Tournoi International de Clermont-Ferrand, as a wildcard. He lost in the first round. He reached his first final later that year, at the G5 International Junior Saint-Cyprien, in doubles. In an all-French final, Halys and Armel Rancezot lost in the super tiebreak against Julien Delaplane and Alexandre Favrot.

=== 2011 ===
Starting 2011, Halys entered a 17–match win streak, winning consecutively the 1st and 2nd Qatar ITF Junior Open, breaking through the qualifiers of both tournaments to win his first two singles titles. He also finished runner-up in the 1st tournament doubles. He streak was sniped by Belgian Clement Geens, at AEGON Junior International Nottingham, a 2-week G4 tournament. Quentin would reach the final in both singles and doubles of the 2nd week, but he won the doubles only. He would win another doubles titles in July of that year, at the Leeuwenbergh ITF G4 Junior Championships. Halys finished 2011 by playing for France at the Junior Davis Cup, where his country finished 3rd that year.

=== 2012 ===
Starting 2012, Quentin played in all Junior Grand Slams but Wimbledon, where he didn't pass the third round of any of them, in singles. He reached the semifinal at Australian Open doubles. Halys only final that year was at the GA Copa Gerdau, partnering Pedro Cachin, where they lost in straight sets to the partnership of Luke Bambridge and Joshua Ward-Hibbert. He played a second year for his country at the Junior Davis Cup, this time finishing in the fourth place.

=== 2013 ===
In 2013, Halys reached four finals in doubles, including the US Open final, where he lost to Kamil Majchrzak and Martin Redlicki, in partnership with Frederico Ferreira Silva. All other finals were at G1 tournaments, winning only at the 35° Torneo International Citta Di Santa Croce, partnering Benjamin Bonzi. In singles, he lost in the finals of the B1 European Junior Championships to Karen Khachanov.

Halys saw much success ahead of 2014, reaching 7 finals with four titles in doubles and one in singles.

=== 2014 ===
Partnering with Johan Sébastien Tatlot, the pair reached the final of the Australian Open, where they lost in straight sets. The partnership would win the GA Porto Alegre Junior Championships (the successor of the Copa Gerdau) in March and the B1 European Junior Championships in July.

Partnering Benjamin Bonzi, the French pair won the French Open, winning in straight sets. Quentin also won the G1 Canadian Open Junior Championships in partnership with Akira Santillan, winning only two matches to win the title, as the pair received two walkovers in the semifinals and the final. Quentin reached also the US Open in singles, losing to Omar Jasika in three sets. Earlier in July, he defeated countryman Corentin Denolly to win the B1 European Junior Championships, his last singles title in junior.

== Professional ==
=== 2015–2017: Major debut & first wins, Challenger title ===
Halys made his major tournament debut at the 2015 French Open as a wildcard entrant.

He also entered as a wildcard in the main draw of the 2016 Australian Open and defeated Ivan Dodig, before losing to the top seed and eventual champion, Novak Djokovic, in the second round.

Again thanks to a wildcard, he recorded his second major match win and first win on clay at the 2016 French Open over Chung Hyeon, in the first round.

=== 2021: US Open debut ===
He reached the main draw for the third time at the 2021 Australian Open as a qualifier.

At the 2021 US Open, Halys also qualified for the first time at this major in five attempts. He lost in the first round to Dominik Koepfer, in five sets.

=== 2022: Two Challenger titles, Masters & top 65 debuts ===
January through March 2022, he won two Challenger titles at the 2022 Teréga Open Pau–Pyrénées and 2022 Play In Challenger in Lille, France and reached two more finals. He reached the top 100 on 9 May 2022, after a quarterfinal showing at the 2022 Open du Pays d'Aix Challenger. At the 2022 French Open, as a direct entry, he lost to 23rd seed John Isner in four tight sets.

On his debut at the 2022 Wimbledon Championships, he won his first match at this major defeating compatriot Benoît Paire. He reached a new top ranking at world No. 74, on 25 July 2022.

Halys made his Masters 1000 debut, after qualifying for the 2022 Rolex Paris Masters, and finished the year ranked world No. 64 in singles.

=== 2023: Masters fourth round & ATP semifinal, major third round ===
Halys reached the quarterfinals of an ATP tournament for the first time in his career in Auckland, after beating Alex Molčan and Ben Shelton but then lost to Jenson Brooksby in the quarterfinals.

On his debut at the 2023 Miami Open, he reached the third round of a Masters 1000 for the first time, having never won a match in his career at this level, defeating Pedro Martínez and 15th seed Alex de Minaur in a three hours and 20 minutes match with three tiebreaks. Next, he defeated Mackenzie McDonald to reach the fourth round for the first time at the Masters level. He lost to Daniil Medvedev in 70 minutes, in straight sets.

In 2023 Estoril Open, he reached his first ATP Tour semifinal having won one ATP match on clay in his career (at the 2016 Roland Garros), defeating Nuno Borges, fourth seed Roberto Bautista Agut and Dominic Thiem. He lost to top seed and eventual champion, Casper Ruud, in three sets.

Halys reached the third round at the 2023 Wimbledon Championships with wins over Dan Evans and Aleksandar Vukic for the first time at a Major.

=== 2024: First ATP Tour final, back to top 100 ===
On 24 June 2024, Halys fell to world No. 223, dropping more than 150 ranking positions from his career-high in January 2023. The same week, he qualified for the 2024 Wimbledon Championships, and reached a consecutive third round with wins over Christopher Eubanks and 21st seed Karen Khachanov before losing to 15th seed Holger Rune in five sets, in the third round.

In July, Halys reached his first final on the ATP Tour in Gstaad as a qualifier. As a result he returned to the top 125 in the rankings on 22 July 2024. He eventually lost in the final to sixth seed Matteo Berrettini.

In August, he qualified for the US Open but lost in the first round to Otto Virtanen in four sets. Following a third Challenger final showing at the Rennes Challenger, he returned to the top 100 on 26 September 2024, despite losing to Jacob Fearnley in the championship match.

=== 2025: ATP 500 semifinal & top 10 win, top 50 ===
At the 2025 Dubai Tennis Championships, Halys qualified for the main draw and recorded his first win at the ATP 500-level defeating Doha champion, world No. 9 and third seed Andrey Rublev. It was the biggest win by ranking and first against a top 10 player in his career. Next, he defeated Roberto Bautista Agut to reach his first ATP 500 quarterfinal and returned to the top 65 in the singles rankings. He reached his first ATP 500 semifinal having never won a match at the 500-level before defeating lucky loser Luca Nardi and reached a new career-high ranking in the top 60, on 3 March 2025.

In May, Halys reached the third round of the 2025 French Open for the first time in his career, by defeating 21st seed Tomáš Macháč in the first round and Miomir Kecmanović in the second. As a result, he reached a new career-high singles ranking in the top 50, on 9 June 2025.

=== 2026: ATP singles and Masters doubles titles ===
In June, Halys reached the third round for a consecutive season at the 2026 French Open but lost to eventual champion and second seed Alexander Zverev. At the same event, he reached the semifinals in doubles partnering compatriot Pierre-Hugues Herbert.

In July, Halys had won his maiden ATP Tour title at the Generali Open Kitzbühel, after defeating Yannick Hanfmann in the semifinal and top seed Alexander Bublik in the final.

== Performance timelines ==
Key
W	F	SF	QF	#R	RR	Q#	DNQ	A	NH

(W) winner; (F) finalist; (SF) semifinalist; (QF) quarterfinalist; (#R) rounds 4, 3, 2, 1; (RR) round-robin stage; (Q#) qualification round; (DNQ) did not qualify; (A) absent; (NH) not held; (SR) strike rate (events won / competed); (W–L) win–loss record.
To avoid confusion and double counting, these charts are updated at the conclusion of a tournament or when the player's participation has ended.

=== Singles ===
Tournament	2013	2014	2015	2016	2017	2018	2019	2020	2021	2022	2023	2024	2025	2026	SR	W–L	Win %
Grand Slam tournaments
Australian Open	A	A	A	2R	1R	1R	Q3	1R	1R	Q2	1R	2R	2R	2R	0 / 9	4–9	31%
French Open	Q2	Q1	1R	2R	1R	Q1	1R	1R	Q3	1R	1R	Q3	3R	3R	0 / 9	5–9	36%
Wimbledon	A	A	A	Q3	Q2	Q1	Q2	NH	Q1	2R	3R	3R	1R	2R	0 / 5	6–5	55%
US Open	A	A	A	Q2	Q1	Q1	Q1	A	1R	1R	1R	1R	1R	2R	0 / 6	1–6	14%
Win–loss	0–0	0–0	0–1	2–2	0–2	0–1	0–1	0–2	0–2	1–3	2–4	3–3	3–4	5–4	0 / 29	16–29	36%
Masters 1000 tournaments
Indian Wells Open	A	A	A	A	A	A	A	NH	A	A	1R	Q1	2R	1R	0 / 3	1–3	25%
Miami Open	A	A	A	A	Q1	A	A	NH	A	A	4R	Q1	2R	4R	0 / 3	7–3	70%
Madrid Open	A	A	A	A	A	A	A	NH	A	A	2R	Q1	1R	Q1	0 / 2	1–2	33%
Italian Open	A	A	A	A	A	A	A	A	A	A	A	A	1R	A	0 / 1	0–1	0%
Canadian Open	A	A	A	A	A	A	A	NH	A	Q2	A	A	1R	A	0 / 1	0–1	0%
Cincinnati Open	A	A	A	Q1	A	A	A	A	A	A	A	A	A	2R	0 / 1	1–1	50%
Shanghai Masters	A	A	A	A	A	A	A	NH			2R	A	2R	3R	0 / 3	4–3	57%
Paris Masters	A	A	Q1	Q1	Q1	A	A	A	A	1R	Q1	1R	Q1	3R	0 / 3	2–3	40%
Win–loss	0–0	0–0	0–0	0–0	0–0	0–0	0–0	0–0	0–0	0–1	5–4	0–1	3–6	8–5	0 / 17	16–17	44%
Year-end ranking	–	636	205	153	130	128	220	203	151	64	100	72	91		$5,709,497		

=== Doubles ===
Current through the 2026 ATP Tour.

Tournament	2015	2016	2017	2018	2019	2020	2021	2022	2023	2024	2025	2026	SR	W–L	Win%
Grand Slam tournaments
Australian Open	A	A	A	A	A	A	A	A	1R	2R	A	A	0 / 2	1–2	33%
French Open	1R	2R	2R	A	3R	1R	1R	1R	A	1R	2R	SF	0 / 10	9–10	47%
Wimbledon	A	1R	A	A	A	NH	A	1R	1R	A	1R	1R	0 / 5	0–5	0%
US Open	A	A	A	A	A	A	A	3R	2R	A	A	1R	0 / 3	3–3	60%
Win–loss	0–1	1–2	1–1	0–0	2–1	0–1	0–1	2–3	1–3	1–2	1–2	4–3	0 / 20	13–20	39%

== ATP Masters 1000 finals ==
=== Doubles: 1 (title) ===
Result	Year	Tournament	Surface	Partner	Opponents	Score
Win	2026	Paris Masters	Hard (i)	(France) Pierre-Hugues Herbert	(United States) Christian Harrison (United Kingdom) Neal Skupski	7–6^{(7–3)}, 6–7^{(4–7)}, [10–8]

== ATP Tour finals ==
=== Singles: 2 (1 title, 1 runner-up) ===
Legend ATP 250 (1–1)	Finals by surface Clay (1–1)	Finals by setting Outdoor (1–1)

Result	W–L	Date	Tournament	Tier	Surface	Opponent	Score
Loss	0–1	Jul 2024	Swiss Open Gstaad, Switzerland	ATP 250	Clay	(Italy) Matteo Berrettini	3–6, 1–6
Win	1–1	Jul 2026	Generali Open Kitzbühel, Austria	ATP 250	Clay	(Kazakhstan) Alexander Bublik	6–4, 7–6^{(8–6)}

=== Doubles: 2 (2 titles) ===
Legend ATP 1000 (1–0) ATP 250 (1–0)	Finals by surface Hard (2–0)	Finals by setting Indoor (2–0)

Result	W–L	Date	Tournament	Tier	Surface	Partner	Opponents	Score
Win	1–0	Nov 2025	Moselle Open, France	ATP 250	Hard (i)	(France) Pierre-Hugues Herbert	(Argentina) Guido Andreozzi (France) Manuel Guinard	7–5, 6–3
Win	2–0	Nov 2026	Paris Masters, France	ATP 1000	Hard (i)	(France) Pierre-Hugues Herbert	(United States) Christian Harrison (United Kingdom) Neal Skupski	7–6^{(7–3)}, 6–7^{(4–7)}, [10–8]

== ATP Challenger and ITF Tour finals ==
=== Singles: 27 (12 titles, 15 runner-ups) ===
Legend ATP Challenger Tour (7–12) ITF Futures/WTT (5–3)	Finals by surface Hard (8–10) Clay (3–4) Carpet (1–1)

Result	W–L	Date	Tournament	Tier	Surface	Opponent	Score
Win	1–0	Oct 2014	Greece F9, Heraklion	Futures	Hard	(Venezuela) Ricardo Rodríguez	6–3, 6–2
Loss	1–1	Feb 2015	Italy F1, Sondrio	Futures	Hard (i)	(Lithuania) Laurynas Grigelis	7–6^{(9–7)}, 3–6, 5–7
Loss	1–2	Mar 2015	Italy F2, Trento	Futures	Carpet (i)	(Canada) Philip Bester	6–3, 5–7, 3–6
Win	2–2	Mar 2015	France F6, Poitiers	Futures	Hard (i)	(France) David Guez	7–5, 6–1
Win	3–2	Mar 2015	Great Britain F5, Shrewsbury	Futures	Hard (i)	(United Kingdom) Daniel Cox	6–4, 3–6, 6–3
Win	4–2	Aug 2015	Italy F24, Piombino	Futures	Hard	(Italy) Edoardo Eremin	6–3, 6–4
Win	5–2	Sep 2015	Great Britain F8, Roehampton	Futures	Hard	(United Kingdom) Daniel Evans	6–1, 6–7^{(5–7)}, 7–5
Win	6–2	Apr 2016	Tallahassee, USA	Challenger	Clay	(United States) Frances Tiafoe	6–7^{(6–8)}, 6–4, 6–2
Loss	6–3	Oct 2016	Fairfield, USA	Challenger	Hard	(Colombia) Santiago Giraldo	6–4, 4–6, 2–6
Loss	6–4	Feb 2017	Bergamo, Italy	Challenger	Hard (i)	(Poland) Jerzy Janowicz	4–6, 4–6
Loss	6–5	Apr 2017	Anning, China, P.R.	Challenger	Clay	(Serbia) Janko Tipsarević	7–6^{(7–5)}, 3–6, 4–6
Win	7–5	Feb 2018	Quimper, France	Challenger	Hard (i)	(Russia) Alexey Vatutin	6–3, 7–6^{(7–1)}
Win	8–5	Apr 2018	Nanchang, China, P.R.	Challenger	Clay (i)	(France) Calvin Hemery	6–3, 6–2
Loss	8–6	Sep 2018	Istanbul, Turkey	Challenger	Hard	(France) Corentin Moutet	3–6, 4–6
Loss	8–7	May 2019	Aix-en-Provence, France	Challenger	Clay	(Uruguay) Pablo Cuevas	5–7, 6–3, 2–6
Loss	8–8	Oct 2019	M25+H Nevers, France	WTT	Hard	(France) Arthur Reymond	6–3, 6–7^{(3–7)}, 4–6
Loss	8–9	Jun 2021	Forlì, Italy	Challenger	Clay	(Germany) Mats Moraing	6–3, 1–6, 5–7
Loss	8–10	Jul 2021	Porto, Portugal	Challenger	Hard	(Turkey) Altuğ Çelikbilek	2-6, 1-6
Loss	8–11	Jan 2022	Forlì, Italy	Challenger	Hard (i)	(Russia) Pavel Kotov	5-7, 7-6^{(7-5)}, 3-6
Win	9–11	Feb 2022	Pau, France	Challenger	Hard (i)	(Canada) Vasek Pospisil	4–6, 6–4, 6–3
Loss	9–12	Feb 2022	Turin, Italy	Challenger	Hard (i)	(Germany) Mats Moraing	6-7^{(11-13)}, 3-6
Win	10–12	Mar 2022	Lille, France	Challenger	Hard (i)	(Lithuania) Ričardas Berankis	4–6, 7–6^{(7–4)}, 6–4
Loss	10–13	May 2022	Bordeaux, France	Challenger	Clay	(Australia) Alexei Popyrin	6-2, 6-7^{(5-7)}, 6-7^{(4-7)}
Loss	10–14	Oct 2022	Orléans, France	Challenger	Hard (i)	(France) Grégoire Barrère	6–4, 3–6, 4–6
Win	11–14	Oct 2022	Ismaning, Germany	Challenger	Carpet (i)	(Germany) Max Hans Rehberg	7–6^{(8–6)}, 6–3
Win	12–14	Jun 2023	Blois, France	Challenger	Clay	(France) Kyrian Jacquet	4-6, 6-2, 2-0 ret.
Loss	12–15	Sep 2024	Rennes, France	Challenger	Hard (i)	(United Kingdom) Jacob Fearnley	6–0, 6–7^{(5–7)}, 3–6

=== Doubles: 18 (11 titles, 7 runner-ups) ===
Legend ATP Challenger Tour (8–4) ITF Futures/WTT (3–3)	Finals by surface Hard (7–5) Clay (3–2) Carpet (1–0)

Result	W–L	Date	Tournament	Tier	Surface	Partner	Opponents	Score
Win	1–0	Feb 2014	Great Britain F5, Nottingham	Futures	Hard (i)	(France) Rémi Boutillier	(United Kingdom) Liam Broady (Republic of Ireland) James Cluskey	6–2, 0–6, [10–8]
Win	2–0	Jul 2014	France F14, Bourg-en-Bresse	Futures	Clay	(France) Maxime Hamou	(France) Maxime Forcin (Luxembourg) Ugo Nastasi	2–6, 6–2, [10–8]
Win	3–0	Oct 2014	Greece F9, Heraklion	Futures	Hard	(France) Benjamin Bonzi	(Mexico) Mauricio Astorga (Mexico) Alberto Rojas-Maldonado	6–2, 6–4
Loss	3–1	Nov 2014	Kuwait F1, Meshref	Futures	Hard	(France) Calvin Hemery	(Spain) Juan Lizariturry (Netherlands) Mark Vervoort	4–6, 6–7^{(4–7)}
Loss	3–2	Jan 2015	France F1, Bagnoles-de-l'Orne	Futures	Clay (i)	(France) Alexandre Sidorenko	(France) Dorian Descloix (France) Gleb Sakharov	4–6, 2–6
Loss	3–3	Oct 2016	Tiburon, USA	Challenger	Hard	(United States) Dennis Novikov	(Australia) Matt Reid (Australia) John-Patrick Smith	1–6, 2–6
Win	4–3	Jan 2017	Nouméa, New Caledonia	Challenger	Hard	(France) Tristan Lamasine	(Spain) Adrián Menéndez Maceiras (Italy) Stefano Napolitano	7–6^{(11–9)}, 6–1
Win	5–3	Jul 2017	Recanati, Italy	Challenger	Hard	(France) Jonathan Eysseric	(Italy) Julian Ocleppo (Italy) Andrea Vavassori	6–7^{(3–7)}, 6–4, [12–10]
Loss	5–4	Nov 2018	Mouilleron-le-Captif, France	Challenger	Hard (i)	(Monaco) Romain Arneodo	(Belgium) Sander Gillé (Belgium) Joran Vliegen	3–6, 6–4, [2–10]
Win	6–4	May 2019	Bordeaux, France	Challenger	Clay	(France) Grégoire Barrère	(Monaco) Romain Arneodo (France) Hugo Nys	6–4, 6–1
Loss	6–5	Oct 2019	M25+H Nevers, France	WTT	Hard	(France) Matteo Martineau	(France) Dan Added (France) Albano Olivetti	4–6, 5–7
Win	7–5	Oct 2019	Ismaning, Germany	Challenger	Carpet (i)	(France) Tristan Lamasine	(United States) Maxime Cressy (United States) James Cerretani	6–3, 7–5
Win	8–5	Mar 2021	Biella, Italy	Challenger	Hard (i)	(France) Tristan Lamasine	(Ukraine) Denys Molchanov (Ukraine) Sergiy Stakhovsky	6-1, 2-0 ret.
Win	9–5	Oct 2021	Mouilleron-le-Captif, France	Challenger	Hard (i)	(France) Jonathan Eysseric	(Netherlands) David Pel (Pakistan) Aisam-ul-Haq Qureshi	4–6, 7–6^{(7–5)}, [10–8]
Win	10–5	Feb 2022	Cherbourg, France	Challenger	Hard (i)	(France) Jonathan Eysseric	(Germany) Hendrik Jebens (Germany) Niklas Schell	7–6^{(8–6)}, 6–2
Loss	10–6	Mar 2022	Lille, France	Challenger	Hard (i)	(France) Jonathan Eysseric	(Norway) Viktor Durasovic (Finland) Patrik Niklas-Salminen	5–7, 6–7^{(1–7)}
Loss	10–7	May 2024	Bordeaux, France	Challenger	Clay	(France) Nicolas Mahut	(United Kingdom) Julian Cash (United States) Robert Galloway	3–6, 6–7^{(2–7)}
Win	11–7	Jun 2024	Zagreb, Croatia	Challenger	Clay	(France) Jonathan Eysseric	(Romania) Mircea-Alexandru Jecan (Portugal) Henrique Rocha	6–4, 6–4

== Junior Grand Slam finals ==
=== Singles: 1 (runner-up) ===
Result	Year	Tournament	Surface	Opponent	Score
Loss	2014	US Open	Hard	(Australia) Omar Jasika	6–2, 5–7, 1–6

=== Doubles: 3 (1 title, 2 runner-ups) ===
Result	Year	Tournament	Surface	Partner	Opponents	Score
Loss	2013	US Open	Hard	(Portugal) Frederico Silva	(Poland) Kamil Majchrzak (United States) Martin Redlicki	3–6, 4–6
Loss	2014	Australian Open	Hard	(France) Johan Tatlot	(Austria) Lucas Miedler (Australia) Bradley Mousley	4–6, 3–6
Win	2014	French Open	Clay	(France) Benjamin Bonzi	(Japan) Renta Tokuda (Japan) Jumpei Yamasaki	6–4, 3–6. [10–3]

== ITF's Junior Circuit ==
=== Singles: 6 (4 titles, 2 runner-ups) ===
Category Category GA (0–1) Category G4 (1–0) Category G5 (2–0) Category GB1 (1–1)	Surface Clay (1–1) Hard (3–1)	Setting Outdoors (4–2)

Result	W–L	Date	Tournament	Category	Surface	Opponent	Score
Win	1–0	Feb 2011	1st Qatar ITF Junior Open, Qatar	Grade 5	Hard	(Norway) Johan Skattum	6–3, 6–0
Win	2–0	Apr 2011	2nd Qatar ITF Junior Open, Qatar	Grade 5	Hard	(France) Maxime Hamou	6–7^{(6–8)}, 6–4, 6–2
Win	3–0	Apr 2011	AEGON Junior International Nottingham (2nd week), UK	Grade 4	Hard	(Netherlands) Max de Vroome	6–1, 5–7, 6–1
Loss	3–1	Jul 2013	European Junior Championships, Switzerland	Grade B1	Clay	(Russia) Karen Khachanov	6–4, 3–6, 4–6
Win	4–1	Jul 2014	European Junior Championships, Switzerland	Grade B1	Clay	(France) Corentin Denolly	6–4, 7–5
Loss	4–2	Sep 2014	US Open, United States	Grade A	Hard	(Australia) Omar Jasika	6–2, 5–7, 1–6

=== Doubles: 14 (7 titles, 7 runner-ups) ===
Category Category GA (2–3) Category G1 (2–2) Category G4 (2–0) Category G5 (0–2) Category GB1 (1–0)	Surface Clay (5–3) Hard (2–4)	Setting Outdoors (7–6) Indoors(i) (0–1)

Outcome	Date	Category	Tournament	Surface	Partner	Opponents	Score
Runner-up	7 November 2010	Grade 5	International Junior Saint-Cyprien, France	Hard (i)	(France) Armel Rancezot	(France) Julien Delaplane (France) Alexandre Favrot	6–7^{(2–7)}, 6–4, [5–10]
Runner-up	4 February 2011	Grade 5	1st Qatar ITF Junior Open, Qatar	Hard	(France) Florian Lakat	(Hong Kong) Chun Hun Wong (Hong Kong) Pak Long Yeung	1–6, 4–6
Winner	18 April 2011	Grade 4	AEGON Junior International Nottingham (2nd week), United Kingdom	Hard	(France) Maxime Hamou	(United Kingdom) Toby Martin (United Kingdom) Toby Mitchell	6–3, 7–6^{(7–5)}
Winner	10 July 2011	Grade 4	Leeuwenbergh ITF Junior Championships, Netherlands	Clay	(France) Maxime Hamou	(Australia) Harry Bourchier (Portugal) Henrique Sousa	3–6, 6–2, 10–5
Runner-up	25 March 2012	Grade A	29th Copa Gerdau, Brazil	Clay	(Argentina) Pedro Cachin	(United Kingdom) Luke Bambridge (United Kingdom) Joshua Ward-Hibbert	5–7, 5–7
Runner-up	17 March 2013	Grade 1	43rd Banana Bowl, Brazil	Clay	(Argentina) Pedro Cachin	(United States) Stefan Kozlov (United States) Spencer Papa	6–4, 3–6, [7–10]
Runner-up	28 April 2013	Grade 1	18ème Open International Junior, France	Clay	(France) Alexander Muller	(Germany) Johannes Härteis (Germany) Hannes Wagner	2–6, 4–6
Winner	18 May 2013	Grade 1	35° Torneo International Citta Di Santa Croce, Italy	Clay	(France) Benjamin Bonzi	(Brazil) Rafael Matos (Brazil) Marcelo Zormann	6–2, 6–2
Runner-up	9 September 2013	Grade A	US Open, United States	Hard	(Portugal) Frederico Ferreira Silva	(Poland) Kamil Majchrzak (United States) Martin Redlicki	3–6, 4–6
Runner-up	25 January 2014	Grade A	Australian Open, Australia	Hard	(France) Johan Sébastien Tatlot	(Austria) Lucas Miedler (Australia) Bradley Mousley	4–6, 3–6
Winner	30 March 2014	Grade A	Porto Alegre Junior Championships, Brazil	Clay	(France) Johan Sébastien Tatlot	(Japan) Renta Tokuda (Japan) Jumpei Yamasaki	6–4, 3–6, [10–3]
Winner	7 June 2014	Grade A	French Open, France	Clay	(France) Benjamin Bonzi	(Austria) Lucas Miedler (Australia) Akira Santillan	6–4, 6–3
Winner	27 July 2014	Grade B1	European Junior Championships, Switzerland	Clay	(France) Johan Sébastien Tatlot	(Netherlands) Tallon Griekspoor (Netherlands) Tim van Rijthoven	6–2, 6–4
Winner	30 August 2014	Grade 1	Canadian Open Junior Championships, Canada	Hard	(Australia) Akira Santillan	(Japan) Naoki Nakagawa (Netherlands) Tim van Rijthoven	Walkover

== Record against Top 10 players ==
Halys's record against those who have been ranked in the top 10, with active players in boldface. Only ATP Tour main draw matches are considered:

Player	Years	MP	Record	Win%	Hard	Clay	Grass	Last match
Number 1 ranked players								
(Spain) **Carlos Alcaraz**	2025	1	0–1	0%	0–1	–	–	Lost (4–6, 2–6) at 2025 Indian Wells
(Spain) Rafael Nadal	2015	1	0–1	0%	–	0–1	–	Lost (3–6, 3–6, 4–6) at 2015 Roland Garros
(Italy) **Jannik Sinner**	2023	1	0–1	0%	–	–	0–1	Lost (6–3, 2–6, 3–6, 4–6) at 2023 Wimbledon
(Serbia) **Novak Djokovic**	2016–2023	2	0–2	0%	0–1	0–1	–	Lost (6–7^{(3–7)}, 6–7^{(5–7)}) at 2023 Adelaide 1
(Russia) **Daniil Medvedev**	2023–2026	3	0–3	0%	0–2	–	0–1	Lost (7–6^{(11–9)}, 3–6, 4–6, 2–6) at 2026 Australian Open
(Germany) **Alexander Zverev**	2026	4	0–4	0%	0–3	0–1	–	Lost (4–6, 7–6^{(10–8)}, 3–6) at 2026 Shanghai Masters
Number 2 ranked players								
(Norway) **Casper Ruud**	2018–2025	3	0–3	0%	0–2	0–1	–	Lost (1–6, 6–7^{(3–7)}) at 2025 Basel
Number 3 ranked players								
(Austria) Dominic Thiem	2023	1	1–0	100%	–	1–0	–	Won (6–1, 6–4) at 2023 Estoril
(Argentina) Juan Martín del Potro	2017	1	0–1	0%	–	0–1	–	Lost (5–7, 4–6) at 2017 Lyon
(Bulgaria) **Grigor Dimitrov**	2024	1	0–1	0%	0–1	–	–	Lost (6–7^{(1–7)}, 3–6) at 2024 Stockholm
(Greece) **Stefanos Tsitsipas**	2023	1	0–1	0%	0–1	–	–	Lost (3–6, 4–6, 6–7^{(6–8)}) at 2023 Australian Open
Number 4 ranked players								
(Japan) **Kei Nishikori**	2019	1	0–1	0%	–	0–1	–	Lost (2–6, 3–6, 4–6) at 2019 Roland Garros
(United States) **Taylor Fritz**	2025	2	0–2	0%	–	0–1	0–1	Lost (3–6, 6–7^{(6–8)}) at 2025 Stuttgart
(Denmark) **Holger Rune**	2024–2025	2	0–2	0%	–	0–1	0–1	Lost (6–4, 2–6, 7–5, 5–7, 2–6) at 2025 French Open
(Canada) **Félix Auger-Aliassime**	2024–2025	3	0–3	0%	0–3	–	–	Lost (7–5, 4–6, 3–6) at 2025 Dubai
Number 5 ranked players								
(United States) **Ben Shelton**	2023	1	1–0	100%	1–0	–	–	Won (6–3, 6–2) at 2023 Auckland
(Australia) **Alex de Minaur**	2023–2026	2	1–1	50%	1–1	–	–	Lost (6–1, 3–6, 6–7^{(4–7)}) at 2026 Cincinnati
(Russia) **Andrey Rublev**	2023–2025	2	1–1	50%	1–1	–	–	Won (3–6, 6–4, 7–6^{(7–5)}) at 2025 Dubai
Number 6 ranked players								
(France) **Gaël Monfils**	2024	1	0–1	0%	0–1	–	–	Lost (6–7^{(5–7)}, 3–6) at 2024 Vienna
(Italy) **Matteo Berrettini**	2024–2025	2	0–2	0%	0–1	0–1	–	Lost (2–6, 4–6) at 2025 Metz
Number 7 ranked players								
(France) Richard Gasquet	2024	1	1–0	100%	–	1–0	–	Won (7–6^{(7–4)}, 7–6^{(7–5)}) at 2024 Gstaad
(Belgium) **David Goffin**	2023–2025	2	0–2	0%	0–2	–	–	Lost (7–6^{(7–2)}, 4–6, 3–6, 5–7) at 2025 US Open
Number 8 ranked players								
(Russia) **Karen Khachanov**	2024	1	1–0	100%	–	–	1–0	Won (4–6, 6–3, 3–6, 6–3, 6–4) at 2024 Wimbledon
(United States) John Isner	2022	1	0–1	0%	–	0–1	–	Lost (6–7^{(3–7)}, 6–4, 6–7^{(1–7)}, 6–7^{(6–8)}) at 2022 Roland Garros
(United States) **Frances Tiafoe**	2026	1	1–0	100%	1–0	–	–	Won (6–3, 1–6, 7–6^{(7–6)}) at 2026 Paris Masters
Number 9 ranked players								
(Spain) Roberto Bautista Agut	2023–2025	3	2–1	67%	1–0	1–1	–	Won (7–6^{(7–5)}, 6–4) at 2025 Dubai
(Italy) Fabio Fognini	2018	1	0–1	0%	0–1	–	–	Lost (6–2, 4–6, 0–6) at 2018 Los Cabos
Number 10 ranked players								
(Kazakhstan) **Alexander Bublik**	2026	2	2–0	100%	–	2–0	–	Won (6–4, 7–6^{(8–6)}) at 2026 Kitzbühel
(Latvia) Ernests Gulbis	2016	1	0–1	0%	0–1	–	–	Lost (4–6, 3–6) at 2016 Montpellier
Total	2015–2026	45	10–35	22%	5–20 (17%)	5–11 (31%)	1–4 (20%)	* Statistics correct as of 15 August 2026.

== Wins over top 10 players ==
- Halys has a 2–17 (5.56%) record against players who were, at the time the match was played, ranked in the top 10.

Season	2025	2026	Total
Wins	1	1	2

#	Player	Rk	Event	Surface	Rd	Score	Rk	Ref
2025
1.	Andrey Rublev	9	Dubai Tennis Championships, UAE	Hard	1R	3–6, 6–4, 7–6^{(7–5)}	77	
2026
2.	(United States) Frances Tiafoe	8	Paris Masters, France	Hard (i)	2R	6–3, 1–6, 7–6^{(11–9)}	46	

- Key: (Rk) first use, opponent rank; (Rd) round; (Rk) 2nd use, player rank; (Ref) reference; (F) final; (SF) semifinal; (QF) quarterfinal; (#R) rounds 4, 3, 2, 1; (RR) round-robin stage; (Q#) qualifying rounds or stages (3), 2, 1.
