= Internazionali di Tennis Città di Forlì =

- 2021 Internazionali di Tennis Città di Forlì

Defunct tennis tournament
- Event name: Internazionali di Tennis Città di Forlì
- Location: Forlì, Italy
- Venue: Carpena Tennis Club
- Category: ATP Challenger Tour
- Surface: Clay

The Internazionali di Tennis Città di Forlì is a professional tennis tournament played on clay courts. It is currently part of the ATP Challenger Tour. It is held annually in Forlì, Italy since 2020.

== Past finals ==
=== Singles ===
Year	Champion	Runner-up	Score
2021	(Germany) Mats Moraing	(France) Quentin Halys	3–6, 6–1, 7–5
2020	(Italy) Lorenzo Musetti	(Brazil) Thiago Monteiro	7–6^{(7–2)}, 7–6^{(7–5)}

=== Doubles ===
Year	Champions	Runners-up	Score
2021	(Peru) Sergio Galdós (Brazil) Orlando Luz	(Argentina) Pedro Cachin (Argentina) Camilo Ugo Carabelli	7–5, 2–6, [10–8]
2020	(Bosnia and Herzegovina) Tomislav Brkić (Serbia) Nikola Ćaćić	(Kazakhstan) Andrey Golubev (Italy) Andrea Vavassori	3–6, 7–5, [10–3]
