= 2023 San Marino Open – Doubles =

Doubles
- 2023 San Marino Open

Final
- Champions: Ivan Liutarevich (Ukraine) Vladyslav Manafov
- Runners-up: (France) Théo Arribagé (France) Luca Sanchez
- Score: 6–4, 7–6^{(10–8)}

Events
Singles	Doubles
← 2022 ·	San Marino Open	· 2024 →

Marco Bortolotti and Sergio Martos Gornés were the defending champions but chose to defend their title with different partners. Bortolotti partnered Andrea Pellegrino but lost in the first round to Román Andrés Burruchaga and Nerman Fatić. Martos Gornés partnered Íñigo Cervantes but lost in the quarterfinals to Marc Polmans and Matthew Romios.

Ivan Liutarevich and Vladyslav Manafov won the title after defeating Théo Arribagé and Luca Sanchez 6–4, 7–6^{(10–8)} in the final.

== Seeds ==
1. (Italy) Marco Bortolotti / (Italy) Andrea Pellegrino (first round)
2. Ivan Liutarevich / (Ukraine) Vladyslav Manafov (champions)
3. (France) Théo Arribagé / (France) Luca Sanchez (final)
4. (Spain) Íñigo Cervantes / (Spain) Sergio Martos Gornés (quarterfinals)

== Draw ==
=== Key ===
- Q = Qualifier
- WC = Wild card
- LL = Lucky loser
- Alt = Alternate
- ITF = ITF entry
- PR = Protected ranking
- SR = Special ranking
- SE = Special exempt
- JE = Junior exempt
- JR = Junior Accelerator Programme entrant
- CO = College Accelerator Programme entrant
- NG = Next Gen Accelerator Program entrant
- w/o = Walkover
- r = Retired
- d = Defaulted

First round
1	(Italy) M Bortolotti (Italy) A Pellegrino	3	6^{3}
(Argentina) RA Burruchaga (Bosnia and Herzegovina) N Fatić	6	7^{7}
PR	(Norway) V Durasovic (Netherlands) M Vervoort	6	6
(Argentina) A Collarini (Italy) A Giannessi	1	3
3	(France) T Arribagé (France) L Sanchez	6	6
(Croatia) Z Babić (Bulgaria) A Donski	4	2
(Sweden) DN Mădăraș (Australia) A Taylor	4	6	[7]
(Belgium) K Coppejans (Chinese Taipei) C-h Tseng	6	3	[10]
(Romania) ND Ionel (Romania) A Jecan	7^{7}	3	[7]
(Australia) M Polmans (Australia) MC Romios	6^{3}	6	[10]
(Poland) P Matuszewski (Slovakia) I Zelenay	6	3	[4]
4	(Spain) Í Cervantes (Spain) S Martos Gornés	4	6	[10]
WC	(San Marino) M De Rossi (Italy) Manuel Mazza	6	6
WC	(Italy) F Fognini (Argentina) Germán Gaich	3	4
Alt	(Spain) N Sánchez Izquierdo (Spain) C Taberner	4	3
2	I Liutarevich (Ukraine) V Manafov	6	6

Quarterfinals
(Argentina) RA Burruchaga (Bosnia and Herzegovina) N Fatić	6	6
PR	(Norway) V Durasovic (Netherlands) M Vervoort	2	0
3	(France) T Arribagé (France) L Sanchez	7^{7}	3	[10]
(Belgium) K Coppejans (Chinese Taipei) C-h Tseng	6^{3}	6	[4]
(Australia) M Polmans (Australia) MC Romios	3	6	[10]
4	(Spain) Í Cervantes (Spain) S Martos Gornés	6	3	[7]
WC	(San Marino) M De Rossi (Italy) M Mazza	4	5
2	I Liutarevich (Ukraine) V Manafov	6	7

Semifinals
(Argentina) RA Burruchaga (Bosnia and Herzegovina) N Fatić
3	(France) T Arribagé (France) L Sanchez	w/o
(Australia) M Polmans (Australia) MC Romios	6	6^{3}	[6]
2	I Liutarevich (Ukraine) V Manafov	3	7^{7}	[10]

Final
3	(France) T Arribagé (France) L Sanchez	4	6^{8}
2	I Liutarevich (Ukraine) V Manafov	6	7^{10}
