= Martin Kližan career statistics =

Career finals
Discipline	Type	Won	Lost	Total	WR ^{1}
Singles	Grand Slam Tournaments	–	–	–	–
Singles	Year-end championships	–	–	–	–
Singles	Olympic Games	–	–	–	–
Singles	ATP Masters 1000 ^{2}	–	–	–	–
Singles	ATP Tour 500	2	0	2	1.00
Singles	ATP Tour 250	4	1	5	0.80
Singles	Total	6	1	7	0.86
Doubles	Grand Slam tournaments	–	–	–	–
Doubles	Year-end championships	–	–	–	–
Doubles	ATP Masters 1000 ^{2}	–	–	–	–
Doubles	Olympic Games	–	–	–	–
Doubles	ATP Tour 500	1	–	1	1.00
Doubles	ATP Tour 250	3	–	3	1.00
Doubles	Total	4	0	4	1.00
Total		10	1	11	0.91
1) WR = Winning Rate; 2) Formerly known as "Super 9" (1996–1999), "Tennis Masters Series" (2000–2003) or "ATP Masters Series" (2004–2008).

This is a list of main career statistics of Slovak professional tennis player Martin Kližan.

== Performance timelines ==
Key
W	F	SF	QF	#R	RR	Q#	P#	DNQ	A	Z#	PO	G	S	B	NMS	NTI	P	NH

(W) winner; (F) finalist; (SF) semifinalist; (QF) quarterfinalist; (#R) rounds 4, 3, 2, 1; (RR) round-robin stage; (Q#) qualification round; (P#) preliminary round; (DNQ) did not qualify; (A) absent; (Z#) Davis/Fed Cup Zonal Group (with number indication) or (PO) play-off; (G) gold, (S) silver or (B) bronze Olympic/Paralympic medal; (NMS) not a Masters tournament; (NTI) not a Tier I tournament; (P) postponed; (NH) not held; (SR) strike rate (events won / competed); (W–L) win–loss record.
To avoid confusion and double counting, these charts are updated at the conclusion of a tournament or when the player's participation has ended.

Davis Cup and World Team Cup matches are included in the statistics. Walkovers are neither official wins nor official losses.

Current through the 2021 Wimbledon Championships.

=== Singles ===
Tournament	2007	2008	2009	2010	2011	2012	2013	2014	2015	2016	2017	2018	2019	2020	2021	SR	W–L	Win%
Grand Slam tournaments
Australian Open	A	A	A	Q1	A	A	1R	3R	2R	1R	1R	A	1R	Q1	Q1	0 / 6	3–6	33%
French Open	Q2	A	A	Q3	A	2R	2R	3R	2R	1R	2R	2R	3R	Q2	Q1	0 / 8	9–8	53%
Wimbledon	A	A	A	A	Q1	2R	1R	1R	1R	1R	1R	A	1R	NH	Q1	0 / 7	1–7	13%
US Open	A	A	A	1R	A	4R	1R	2R	2R	1R	A	A	1R	A	A	0 / 7	5–7	42%
Win–loss	0–0	0–0	0–0	0–1	0–0	5–3	1–4	5–4	3–4	0–4	1–3	1–1	2–4	0–0	0–0	0 / 28	18–28	39%
National representation
Olympics	NH	A	not held			1R	not held			A	not held				A	0 / 1	0–1	0%
Davis Cup	PO	A	Z1	Z1	Z1	Z1	A	PO	PO	A	Z1	Z1	QR	NH	A	0 / 3	21–9	70%
ATP World Tour Masters 1000
Indian Wells	A	A	A	A	A	A	2R	A	2R	2R	2R	Q1	2R	NH	A	0 / 5	3–5	38%
Miami Open	A	A	A	A	A	A	2R	A	2R	A	1R	A	1R	NH	A	0 / 4	1–4	20%
Monte-Carlo	A	A	A	A	A	A	1R	A	1R	A	1R	A	2R	NH	Q1	0 / 4	1–4	20%
Madrid Open^{1}	A	A	A	A	A	A	1R	A	1R	A	A	A	1R	NH	A	0 / 3	0–3	0%
Italian Open	A	A	A	A	A	A	1R	A	1R	A	A	A	Q1	A	A	0 / 2	0–2	0%
Canadian Open	A	A	A	A	A	A	2R	A	1R	A	A	A	A	NH	A	0 / 2	1–2	33%
Cincinnati Masters	A	A	A	A	A	A	1R	1R	2R	A	A	A	A	A	A	0 / 3	1–3	25%
Shanghai Masters^{2}	A	A	A	A	A	2R	A	2R	2R	1R	A	Q2	A	NH		0 / 4	3–4	43%
Paris Masters	A	A	A	A	A	1R	A	A	1R	1R	A	A	A	A	A	0 / 3	0–3	0%
Win–loss	0–0	0–0	0–0	0–0	0–0	1–2	1–7	1–2	4–9	1–3	1–3	0–0	2–4	0–0	0–0	0 / 30	10–30	25%
Career statistics
	2007	2008	2009	2010	2011	2012	2013	2014	2015	2016	2017	2018	2019	2020	2021	Career		
Tournaments	1	0	1	2	2	15	24	17	28	17	15	10	18	2	0	152		
Titles	0	0	0	0	0	1	0	1	1	2	0	1	0	0	0	6		
Finals	0	0	0	0	0	1	0	1	1	2	0	2	0	0	0	7		
Overall win–loss	1–2	0–0	0–1	3–4	2–4	19–15	12–24	25–14	30–27	14–15	11–16	22–9	10–20	0–2	0–0	149–153		
Win (%)	33%	–	0%	43%	33%	56%	33%	64%	53%	48%	41%	71%	33%	0%	–	49%		
Year-end ranking	395	606	234	155	117	30	110	34	43	35	141	41	141	151	290	$5,524,410		

^{1} Held as Hamburg Masters (clay) until 2008, Madrid Masters (clay) 2009–present.
^{2} Held as Madrid Masters (indoor hardcourt) from 2002 to 2008, Shanghai Masters (outdoor hardcourt) 2009–present.

=== Doubles ===
Tournament	2007	2008	2009	2010	2011	2012	2013	2014	2015	2016	2017	2018	2019	2020	2021	SR	W–L	Win%
Grand Slam tournaments
Australian Open	A	A	A	A	A	A	2R	A	1R	1R	1R	A	1R	A	A	0 / 5	1–5	17%
French Open	A	A	A	A	A	A	1R	1R	1R	1R	1R	A	1R	A	A	0 / 6	0–6	0%
Wimbledon	A	A	A	A	A	1R	1R	2R	1R	A	A	A	A	NH	A	0 / 4	1–4	20%
US Open	A	A	A	A	A	1R	1R	1R	1R	1R	A	A	A	A	A	0 / 5	0–5	0%
Win–loss	0–0	0–0	0–0	0–0	0–0	0–2	1–4	1–3	0–4	0–3	0–2	0–0	0–2	0–0	0–0	0 / 20	2–20	9%

== ATP Tour finals ==
=== Singles: 7 (6 titles, 1 runner-up) ===
Legend Grand Slam (–) ATP 1000 (–) ATP 500 / Premier – Int. Gold (2–0) ATP 250 / International (4–1)	Finals by surface Hard (2–1) Clay (4–0) Grass (–) Carpet (–)	Finals by setting Outdoor (4–0) Indoor (2–1)

Result	W–L	Date	Tournament	Tier	Surface	Opponent	Score
Win	1–0	Sep 2012	St. Petersburg Open, Russia	ATP 250	Hard (i)	(Italy) Fabio Fognini	6–2, 6–3
Win	2–0	May 2014	Bavarian Open, Germany	ATP 250	Clay	(Italy) Fabio Fognini	2–6, 6–1, 6–2
Win	3–0	Apr 2015	Grand Prix Hassan II, Morocco	ATP 250	Clay	(Spain) Daniel Gimeno Traver	6–2, 6–2
Win	4–0	Feb 2016	Rotterdam Open, Netherlands	ATP 500	Hard (i)	(France) Gaël Monfils	6–7^{(1–7)}, 6–3, 6–1
Win	5–0	Jul 2016	German Open, Germany	ATP 500	Clay	(Uruguay) Pablo Cuevas	6–1, 6–4
Win	6–0	Aug 2018	Austrian Open, Austria	ATP 250	Clay	(Uzbekistan) Denis Istomin	6–2, 6–2
Loss	6–1	Sep 2018	St. Petersburg Open, Russia	ATP 250	Hard (i)	(Austria) Dominic Thiem	3–6, 1–6

=== Doubles: 4 (4 titles) ===
Legend Grand Slam (–) ATP 1000 (–) ATP 500 / Premier – Int. Gold (1–0) ATP 250 / International (3–0)	Finals by surface Hard (–) Clay (4–0) Grass (–) Carpet (–)	Finals by setting Outdoor (4–0) Indoor (–)

Result	W–L	Date	Tournament	Tier	Surface	Partner	Opponents	Score
Win	1–0	Jul 2013	Croatia Open, Croatia	ATP 250	Clay	(Spain) David Marrero	(United States) Nicholas Monroe (Germany) Simon Stadler	6–1, 5–7, [10–7]
Win	2–0	May 2014	Open de Nice Côte d'Azur, France	ATP 250	Clay	(Austria) Philipp Oswald	(India) Rohan Bopanna (Pakistan) Aisam-ul-Haq Qureshi	6–2, 6–0
Win	3–0	Feb 2015	Rio Open, Brazil	ATP 500	Clay	(Austria) Philipp Oswald	(Spain) Pablo Andújar (Austria) Oliver Marach	7–6^{(7–3)}, 6–4
Win	4–0	Jul 2016	Croatia Open, Croatia (2)	ATP 250	Clay	(Spain) David Marrero	(Croatia) Nikola Mektić (Croatia) Antonio Šančić	6–4, 6–2

== ATP Challenger Tour finals ==
=== Singles: 12 (7 titles, 5 runner-ups) ===
Legend ATP Challenger Tour (7–5)	Finals by surface Hard (2–1) Clay (5–4)

Result	W–L	Date	Tournament	Tier	Surface	Opponent	Score
Win	1–0	Nov 2010	Slovak Open, Slovakia	Challenger	Hard	(Austria) Stefan Koubek	7–6^{(7–4)}, 6–2
Loss	1–1	Apr 2011	Rai Roma Open, Italy	Challenger	Clay	(Netherlands) Thomas Schoorel	5–7, 6–1, 3–6
Loss	1–2	Aug 2011	San Marino Open, San Marino	Challenger	Clay	(Italy) Potito Starace	1–6, 0–3 ret.
Win	2–2	Sep 2011	AON Open, Italy	Challenger	Clay	(Argentina) Leonardo Mayer	6–3, 6–1
Win	3–2	Mar 2012	Morocco Tennis Tour – Rabat, Morocco	Challenger	Clay	(Italy) Filippo Volandri	6–2, 6–3
Win	4–2	Mar 2012	Morocco Tennis Tour – Marrakech, Morocco	Challenger	Clay	(Romania) Adrian Ungur	3–6, 6–3, 6–0
Loss	4–3	May 2012	Prague Open, Czech Republic	Challenger	Clay	(Argentina) Horacio Zeballos	6–1, 4–6, 6–7^{(6–8)}
Win	5–3	May 2012	Bordeaux Open, France	Challenger	Clay	(Russia) Teymuraz Gabashvili	7–5, 6–3
Win	6–3	Aug 2012	San Marino Open, San Marino (2)	Challenger	Clay	(Italy) Simone Bolelli	6–3, 6–1
Loss	6–4	Mar 2014	Seguros Bolívar Open, Colombia	Challenger	Clay	(Uruguay) Pablo Cuevas	3–6, 1–6
Win	7–4	Mar 2018	Oracle Challenger – Indian Wells, United States	Challenger	Hard	(Barbados) Darian King	6–3, 6–3
Loss	7–5	Oct 2020	Istanbul Challenger, Turkey	Challenger	Hard	(Belarus) Ilya Ivashka	1–6, 4–6

=== Doubles: 15 (4 titles, 11 runner-ups) ===
Legend ATP Challenger Tour (4–11)	Finals by surface Hard (0–1) Clay (4–10)

Result	W–L	Date	Tournament	Tier	Surface	Partner	Opponents	Score
Loss	0–1	Jun 2009	Košice Open, Slovakia	Challenger	Clay	(Slovakia) Dominik Hrbatý	(Spain) Rubén Ramírez Hidalgo (Spain) Santiago Ventura	2–6, 6–7^{(5–7)}
Loss	0–2	Sep 2009	Black Forest Open, Germany	Challenger	Clay	(Canada) Adil Shamasdin	(Czech Republic) Jan Hájek (Czech Republic) Dušan Karol	6–4, 4–6, [5–10]
Loss	0–3	Feb 2010	Morocco Tennis Tour – Tanger, Morocco	Challenger	Clay	(Belarus) Uladzimir Ignatik	(Belgium) Steve Darcis (Germany) Dominik Meffert	7–5, 5–7, [7–10]
Loss	0–4	Mar 2010	Internazionali Città di Caltanissetta, Italy	Challenger	Clay	(Belarus) Uladzimir Ignatik	(Spain) David Marrero (Spain) Santiago Ventura	6–7^{(3–7)}, 4–6
Loss	0–5	Aug 2010	Bahia Open, Brazil	Challenger	Hard	(Belarus) Uladzimir Ignatik	(Brazil) Franco Ferreiro (Brazil) André Sá	2–6, 4–6
Win	1–5	Apr 2011	Rai Roma Open, Italy	Challenger	Clay	(Italy) Alessandro Motti	(Italy) Thomas Fabbiano (Italy) Walter Trusendi	7–6^{(7–3)}, 6–4
Loss	1–6	Jun 2011	Sporting Torino Challenger, Italy	Challenger	Clay	(Belarus) Uladzimir Ignatik	(Austria) Philipp Oswald (Austria) Martin Fischer	3–6, 4–6
Loss	1–7	Mar 2012	Morocco Tennis Tour – Rabat, Morocco	Challenger	Clay	(France) Stéphane Robert	(Spain) Íñigo Cervantes Huegun (Argentina) Federico Delbonis	7–6^{(7–3)}, 1–6, [5–10]
Win	2–7	Mar 2012	Morocco Tennis Tour – Marrakech, Morocco	Challenger	Clay	(Spain) Daniel Muñoz de la Nava	(Spain) Íñigo Cervantes Huegun (Argentina) Federico Delbonis	6–3, 1–6, [12–10]
Loss	2–8	May 2012	Prague Open, Czech Republic	Challenger	Clay	(Slovakia) Igor Zelenay	(Czech Republic) Lukáš Rosol (Argentina) Horacio Zeballos	5–7, 6–2, [10–12]
Win	3–8	May 2012	Bordeaux Open, France	Challenger	Clay	(Slovakia) Igor Zelenay	(France) Olivier Charroin (United Kingdom) Jonathan Marray	7–6^{(7–5)}, 4–6, [10–4]
Win	4–8	Oct 2017	BFD Lazio Challenger, Italy	Challenger	Clay	(Slovakia) Jozef Kovalík	(Belgium) Sander Gillé (Belgium) Joran Vliegen	6–3, 7–6^{(7–5)}
Loss	4–9	Mar 2018	Casino Admiral Trophy, Spain	Challenger	Clay	(Slovakia) Jozef Kovalík	(Argentina) Guido Andreozzi (Uruguay) Ariel Behar	3–6, 4–6
Loss	4–10	Aug 2018	Città di Como Challenger, Italy	Challenger	Clay	(Slovakia) Filip Polášek	(Germany) Andre Begemann (Germany) Dustin Brown	6–3, 4–6, [5–10]
Loss	4–11	Sep 2018	AON Open, Italy	Challenger	Clay	(Slovakia) Filip Polášek	(Germany) Kevin Krawietz (Germany) Andreas Mies	2–6, 6–3, [2–10]

== ITF Tour finals ==
=== Singles: 12 (8 titles, 4 runner-ups) ===
Legend ITF Futures/WTT (8–4)	Finals by surface Hard (2–3) Clay (6–1)

Result	W–L	Date	Tournament	Tier	Surface	Opponent	Score
Loss	0–1	May 2007	Romania F1, Bucharest	Futures	Clay	(Belgium) Niels Desein	6–7^{(3–7)}, 6–7^{(7–9)}
Loss	0–2	Feb 2008	Croatia F1, Zagreb	Futures	Hard	(Croatia) Franko Škugor	3–6, 2–6
Loss	0–3	Mar 2009	Kazakhstan F1, Astana	Futures	Hard	(Kazakhstan) Alexey Kedryuk	0–6, 6–7^{(4–7)}
Loss	0–4	Mar 2009	Kazakhstan F2, Almaty	Futures	Hard	(Slovakia) Marek Semjan	6–3, 6–7^{(6–8)}, 6–7^{(1–7)}
Win	1–4	Aug 2009	Slovakia F1, Stupava	Futures	Clay	(Czech Republic) Jiří Školoudík	6–3, 6–4
Win	2–4	Aug 2009	Italy F23, Bolzano	Futures	Clay	(Austria) Philipp Oswald	6–3, 6–4
Win	3–4	Jan 2010	Morocco F1, Casablanca	Futures	Clay	(Italy) Alberto Brizzi	6–7^{(1–7)}, 6–2, 6–0
Win	4–4	Oct 2010	Kuwait F2, Mishref	Futures	Hard	(Russia) Mikhail Vasiliev	6–1, 6–1
Win	5–4	Mar 2024	M15 Heraklion, Greece	WTT	Hard	(Lithuania) Edas Butvilas	6–4, 6–3
Win	6–4	Apr 2024	M15 Telde, Spain	WTT	Clay	(Spain) Diego Barreto Sánchez	3–6, 6–3, 7–5
Win	7–4	May 2024	M25 Valldoreix, Spain	WTT	Clay	(Germany) Nicola Kuhn	3–6, 6–0, 6–3
Win	8–4	May 2024	M25 Reggio Emilia, Italy	WTT	Clay	(Netherlands) Jelle Sels	6–4, 6–4

=== Doubles: 5 (3 titles, 2 runner-ups) ===
Legend ITF Futures (3–2)	Finals by surface Hard (1–0) Clay (2–2)

Result	W–L	Date	Tournament	Tier	Surface	Partner	Opponents	Score
Loss	0–1	Mar 2007	Morocco F1, Oujda	Futures	Clay	(Slovakia) Marek Semjan	(Argentina) Damián Patriarca (Argentina) Máximo González	6–4, 5–7, 4–6
Win	1–1	Mar 2009	Kazakhstan F1, Astana	Futures	Hard	(Slovakia) Marek Semjan	(Russia) Andrei Plotniy (Russia) Dmitri Sitak	7–6^{(7–5)}, 7–5
Win	2–1	May 2009	Czech Republic F3, Jablonec Nad Nisu	Futures	Clay	(Czech Republic) Roman Jebavý	(Czech Republic) Michal Tabara (Czech Republic) Roman Vögeli	6–4, 6–4
Win	3–1	Jul 2009	Italy F17, Bologna	Futures	Clay	(Czech Republic) Roman Jebavý	(Italy) Francesco Aldi (Italy) Federico Torresi	6–3, 7–6^{(8–6)}
Loss	3–2	Jan 2010	Morocco F1, Casablanca	Futures	Clay	(Hungary) Ádám Kellner	(Italy) Alberto Brizzi (Italy) Simone Vagnozzi	3–6, 2–6

== Wins over top 10 players ==
- Kližan's match record against players who were, at the time the match was played, ranked in the top 10.

Season	2007	...	2012	2013	2014	...	2018	Total
Wins	0		1	0	2		1	4

No.	Player	Rank	Tournament	Surface	Rd	Score	Rk
2012
1.	(France) Jo-Wilfried Tsonga	6	US Open, United States	Hard	2R	6–4, 1–6, 6–1, 6–3	52
2014
2.	(Japan) Kei Nishikori	10	French Open, France	Clay	1R	7–6^{(7–4)}, 6–1, 6–2	59
3.	(Spain) Rafael Nadal	2	China Open, China	Hard	QF	6–7^{(7–9)}, 6–4, 6–3	56
2018
4.	(Austria) Dominic Thiem	8	Austrian Open, Austria	Clay	2R	6–1, 1–6, 7–5	112

== Junior Grand Slam finals ==
=== Singles: 1 (title) ===
Result	Year	Tournament	Surface	Opponent	Score
Win	2006	French Open	Clay	(Canada) Philip Bester	6–3, 6–1

=== Doubles: 2 (2 runner-ups) ===
Result	Year	Tournament	Surface	Partner	Opponents	Score
Loss	2006	Wimbledon	Grass	(Slovakia) Andrej Martin	(United States) Kellen Damico (United States) Nathaniel Schnugg	6–7^{(7–9)}, 2–6
Loss	2007	Wimbledon	Grass	(Czech Republic) Roman Jebavý	(Paraguay) Daniel Alejandro López (Italy) Matteo Trevisan	6–7^{(5–7)}, 6–4, [8–10]
