= 2025 San Marino Open – Singles =

Singles
- 2025 San Marino Open

Final
- Champion: (Slovakia) Lukáš Klein
- Runner-up: (Croatia) Dino Prižmić
- Score: 6–3, 6–4

Events
Singles	Doubles
← 2024 ·	San Marino Open	· 2026 →

Alexandre Müller was the defending champion but chose not to defend his title.

Lukáš Klein won the title after defeating Dino Prižmić 6–3, 6–4 in the final.

== Seeds ==
1. (France) Valentin Royer (second round)
2. (Argentina) Thiago Agustín Tirante (semifinals)
3. (Italy) Matteo Gigante (semifinals)
4. (France) Kyrian Jacquet (second round)
5. (Croatia) Dino Prižmić (final)
6. (Argentina) Federico Agustín Gómez (second round, retired)
7. (Austria) Lukas Neumayer (quarterfinals)
8. (France) Ugo Blanchet (first round)

== Draw ==
=== Key ===
- Q = Qualifier
- WC = Wild card
- LL = Lucky loser
- Alt = Alternate
- ITF = ITF entry
- PR = Protected ranking
- SR = Special ranking
- SE = Special exempt
- JE = Junior exempt
- JR = Junior Accelerator Programme entrant
- CO = College Accelerator Programme entrant
- NG = Next Gen Accelerator Program entrant
- w/o = Walkover
- r = Retired
- d = Defaulted

=== Finals ===
Semifinals
(Slovakia) Lukáš Klein	7^{7}	6
3	(Italy) Matteo Gigante	6^{5}	4
5	(Croatia) Dino Prižmić	6	4	6
2	(Argentina) Thiago Agustín Tirante	1	6	3

Final
(Slovakia) Lukáš Klein	6	6
5	(Croatia) Dino Prižmić	3	4

=== Top half ===
First round
1	(France) V Royer	3	6	6
(Argentina) F Mena	6	2	2
(Bolivia) M Dellien	2	6	3
(Slovakia) L Klein	6	0	6
WC	(Italy) Pierluigi Basile	3	3
(Paraguay) AD Vallejo	6	6
(Argentina) A Collarini	6^{4}	2
7	(Austria) L Neumayer	7^{7}	6
3	(Italy) M Gigante	6^{10}	6	6
Q	(North Macedonia) K Ivanovski	7^{12}	3	3
Q	(Lithuania) R Berankis	7	5	6^{6}
Alt	(Croatia) M Poljičak	5	7	7^{8}
(France) L Pavlovic	6	6
Q	(Slovakia) M Karol	1	4
(Ukraine) V Sachko	2	6	6^{6}
6	(Argentina) FA Gómez	6	4	7^{8}

Second round
1	(France) V Royer	6^{4}	6	4
(Slovakia) L Klein	7^{7}	3	6
(Paraguay) AD Vallejo	2	6	4
7	(Austria) L Neumayer	6	3	6
3	(Italy) M Gigante	1	6	6
Alt	(Croatia) M Poljičak	6	4	1
(France) L Pavlovic	3	7^{7}	1
6	(Argentina) FA Gómez	6	6^{3}	1^{r}

Quarterfinals
(Slovakia) L Klein	6^{3}	6	6
7	(Austria) L Neumayer	7^{7}	4	4
3	(Italy) M Gigante	3	6	6
(France) L Pavlovic	6	4	3

Semifinals
(Slovakia) L Klein	7^{7}	6
3	(Italy) M Gigante	6^{5}	4

=== Bottom half ===
First round
5	(Croatia) D Prižmić	7	6
(Ecuador) Á Guillén Meza	5	1
Q	(Argentina) G Villanueva	3	6	4
Q	(Ukraine) O Prihodko	6	3	6
(Spain) D Rincón	5	4
(Germany) J Engel	7	6
(Italy) F Arnaboldi	1	5
4	(France) K Jacquet	6	7
8	(France) U Blanchet	6^{5}	5
WC	(Italy) CA Caniato	7^{7}	7
NG	(France) A Géa	1	6^{4}
(France) H Mayot	6	7^{7}
WC	(Italy) F Cinà	6	6
Q	(Argentina) M Kestelboim	2	1
Alt	(Bosnia and Herzegovina) N Fatić	2	6^{2}
2	(Argentina) TA Tirante	6	7^{7}

Second round
5	(Croatia) D Prižmić	6	6
Q	(Ukraine) O Prihodko	2	4
(Germany) J Engel	2	6	6
4	(France) K Jacquet	6	4	2
WC	(Italy) CA Caniato	6	2	4
(France) H Mayot	4	6	6
WC	(Italy) F Cinà	3	3
2	(Argentina) TA Tirante	6	6

Quarterfinals
5	(Croatia) D Prižmić	6	6
(Germany) J Engel	2	2
(France) H Mayot	3	3
2	(Argentina) TA Tirante	6	6

Semifinals
5	(Croatia) D Prižmić	6	4	6
2	(Argentina) TA Tirante	1	6	3
