= 2022 San Marino Open – Singles =

Singles
- 2022 San Marino Open

Final
- Champion: Pavel Kotov
- Runner-up: (Italy) Matteo Arnaldi
- Score: 7–6^{(7–5)}, 6–4

Events
| Singles | Doubles |
| ← 2021 · | San Marino Open | · 2023 → |

Holger Rune was the defending champion but chose not to defend his title.

Pavel Kotov won the title after defeating Matteo Arnaldi 7–6^{(7–5)}, 6–4 in the final.

== Seeds ==
1. (Spain) Carlos Taberner (second round)
2. Pavel Kotov (champion)
3. (Italy) Giulio Zeppieri (first round)
4. (Italy) Flavio Cobolli (first round)
5. (Italy) Marco Cecchinato (semifinals)
6. (France) Alexandre Müller (first round)
7. (Croatia) Nino Serdarušić (first round)
8. (Italy) Matteo Arnaldi (final)

== Draw ==
=== Key ===
- Q = Qualifier
- WC = Wild card
- LL = Lucky loser
- Alt = Alternate
- SE = Special exempt
- PR = Protected ranking
- ITF = ITF entry
- JE = Junior exempt
- w/o = Walkover
- r = Retired
- d = Defaulted
- SR = Special ranking

=== Finals ===
Semifinals
Alt | (Romania) Filip Cristian Jianu | 1 | 5
8 | (Italy) Matteo Arnaldi | 6 | 7
5 | (Italy) Marco Cecchinato | 6 | 5 | 1
2 | Pavel Kotov | 3 | 7 | 6

Final
8 | (Italy) Matteo Arnaldi | 6^{5} | 4
2 | Pavel Kotov | 7^{7} | 6

=== Top half ===
First round
1 | (Spain) C Taberner | 6 | 2 | 6
(Spain) O Roca Batalla | 4 | 6 | 2
Alt | (Romania) FC Jianu | 7^{7} | 6
WC | (Latvia) E Gulbis | 6^{4} | 0
(Netherlands) R Haase | 7^{7} | 6
(Finland) O Virtanen | 6^{3} | 3
(Spain) N Sánchez Izquierdo | 3 | 6 | 6
6 | (France) A Müller | 6 | 3 | 0
4/WC | (Italy) F Cobolli | 6^{5} | 4
(Hungary) F Marozsán | 7^{7} | 6
(Netherlands) J Sels | 2 | 3
(Italy) M Gigante | 6 | 6
Alt | I Gakhov | 2 | 6^{4}
Q | (Austria) L Neumayer | 6 | 7^{7}
(Italy) F Gaio | 2 | 0
8 | (Italy) M Arnaldi | 6 | 6

Second round
1 | (Spain) C Taberner | 4 | 3
Alt | (Romania) FC Jianu | 6 | 6
(Netherlands) R Haase | 6 | 1 | 3
(Spain) N Sánchez Izquierdo | 2 | 6 | 6
(Hungary) F Marozsán | 6 | 6
(Italy) M Gigante | 2 | 2
Q | (Austria) L Neumayer | 3 | 4
8 | (Italy) M Arnaldi | 6 | 6

Quarterfinals
Alt | (Romania) FC Jianu | 6 | 6
(Spain) N Sánchez Izquierdo | 2 | 4
(Hungary) F Marozsán | 4 | 2
8 | (Italy) M Arnaldi | 6 | 6

Semifinals
Alt | (Romania) FC Jianu | 1 | 5
8 | (Italy) M Arnaldi | 6 | 7

=== Bottom half ===
First round
5 | (Italy) M Cecchinato | 6 | 6
WC | (Italy) M Bellucci | 2 | 1
(Bosnia and Herzegovina) N Fatić | 3 | 2
Q | (Italy) F Forti | 6 | 6
(Netherlands) J de Jong | 6 | 6
(Argentina) M Trungelliti | 3 | 4
Q | (Monaco) V Vacherot | 2 | 7^{7} | 6
3 | (Italy) G Zeppieri | 6 | 6^{2} | 1
7 | (Croatia) N Serdarušić | 6^{0} | 6 | 3
(Italy) L Giustino | 7^{7} | 4 | 6
(Kazakhstan) T Skatov | 3 | 1
Q | (Italy) Alexander Weis | 6 | 6
Alt | (France) M Janvier | 6 | 3 | 7
Q | (Ukraine) O Prihodko | 1 | 6 | 5
Q | (Norway) V Durasovic | 1 | 1
2 | P Kotov | 6 | 6

Second round
5 | (Italy) M Cecchinato | 6^{3} | 7^{8} | 6
Q | (Italy) F Forti | 7^{7} | 6^{6} | 2
(Netherlands) J de Jong | 2 | 3
Q | (Monaco) V Vacherot | 6 | 6
(Italy) L Giustino | 2 | 5
Q | (Italy) A Weis | 6 | 7
Alt | (France) M Janvier | 4 | 3
2 | P Kotov | 6 | 6

Quarterfinals
5 | (Italy) M Cecchinato | 7^{7} | 6
Q | (Monaco) V Vacherot | 6^{3} | 1
Q | (Italy) A Weis | 5 | 0
2 | P Kotov | 7 | 6

Semifinals
5 | (Italy) M Cecchinato | 6 | 5 | 1
2 | P Kotov | 3 | 7 | 6
