= 2024 San Marino Open – Singles =

Singles
- 2024 San Marino Open

Final
- Champion: (France) Alexandre Müller
- Runner-up: (Chinese Taipei) Tseng Chun-hsin
- Score: 6–3, 4–6, 7–6^{(7–3)}

Events
Singles	Doubles
← 2023 ·	San Marino Open	· 2025 →

Jaume Munar was the defending champion but chose not to defend his title.

Alexandre Müller won the title after defeating Tseng Chun-hsin 6–3, 4–6, 7–6^{(7–3)} in the final.

== Seeds ==
1. (Italy) Fabio Fognini (semifinals)
2. (Argentina) Francisco Comesaña (semifinals)
3. (France) Alexandre Müller (champion)
4. (Spain) Albert Ramos Viñolas (first round)
5. (Italy) Matteo Gigante (quarterfinals)
6. (Brazil) Gustavo Heide (quarterfinals)
7. (Italy) Andrea Pellegrino (quarterfinals)
8. (Argentina) Juan Manuel Cerúndolo (quarterfinals)

== Draw ==
=== Key ===
- Q = Qualifier
- WC = Wild card
- LL = Lucky loser
- Alt = Alternate
- SE = Special exempt
- PR = Protected ranking
- ITF = ITF entry
- JE = Junior exempt
- w/o = Walkover
- r = Retired
- d = Defaulted
- SR = Special ranking

=== Finals ===
Semifinals
1/WC	(Italy) Fabio Fognini	2	5
3	(France) Alexandre Müller	6	7
(Chinese Taipei) Tseng Chun-hsin	4	6	6
2	(Argentina) Francisco Comesaña	6	1	3

Final
3	(France) Alexandre Müller	6	4	7^{7}
(Chinese Taipei) Tseng Chun-hsin	3	6	6^{3}

=== Top half ===
First round
1/WC	(Italy) F Fognini	6^{5}	6	6
Q	(Brazil) P Sakamoto	7^{7}	1	2
(Italy) Samuel Vincent Ruggeri	6	6
Q	(Brazil) JL Reis da Silva	4	1
(Lithuania) V Gaubas	3	2
(France) K Jacquet	6	6
WC	(Italy) Andrea Picchione	1	6^{5}
5	(Italy) M Gigante	6	7^{7}
3	(France) A Müller	6	7^{7}
Q	(Switzerland) R Bertola	1	6^{3}
Q	(Brazil) M Alves	6^{2}	6^{2}
(Italy) G Fonio	7^{7}	7^{7}
(Argentina) A Collarini	3	6	3
WC	(Italy) M Cecchinato	6	3	6
(Peru) G Bueno	2	1
8	(Argentina) JM Cerúndolo	6	6

Second round
1/WC	(Italy) F Fognini	1	7^{7}	6
(Italy) S Vincent Ruggeri	6	6^{5}	0
(France) K Jacquet	3	3
5	(Italy) M Gigante	6	6
3	(France) A Müller	6	6
(Italy) G Fonio	3	3
WC	(Italy) M Cecchinato	4	6^{2}
8	(Argentina) JM Cerúndolo	6	7^{7}

Quarterfinals
1/WC	(Italy) F Fognini	7	6
5	(Italy) M Gigante	5	2
3	(France) A Müller	6	6
8	(Argentina) JM Cerúndolo	2	3

Semifinals
1/WC	(Italy) F Fognini	2	5
3	(France) A Müller	6	7

=== Bottom half ===
First round
6	(Brazil) G Heide	3	6	6
(Austria) F Misolic	6	4	1
LL	(Argentina) G Villanueva	3	5
(Bosnia and Herzegovina) N Fatić	6	7
(Chinese Taipei) C-h Tseng	6	6
(Italy) F Maestrelli	3	3
Q	(Spain) Carlos López Montagud	1	6	6
4	(Spain) A Ramos Viñolas	6	2	2
7	(Italy) A Pellegrino	6	7
Q	Kirill Kivattsev	4	5
(France) B Paire	2	1
Alt	(Italy) Alexander Weis	6	6
(Dominican Republic) N Hardt	6	6
(France) M Janvier	1	3
LL	(Brazil) D Dutra da Silva	1	3
2	(Argentina) F Comesaña	6	6

Second round
6	(Brazil) G Heide	6	5	7^{7}
(Bosnia and Herzegovina) N Fatić	2	7	6^{5}
(Chinese Taipei) C-h Tseng	6	6
Q	(Spain) C López Montagud	4	3
7	(Italy) A Pellegrino	6	6^{1}	6
Alt	(Italy) A Weis	1	7^{7}	2
(Dominican Republic) N Hardt	7^{7}	4	4
2	(Argentina) F Comesaña	6^{2}	6	6

Quarterfinals
6	(Brazil) G Heide	6^{2}	2
(Chinese Taipei) C-h Tseng	7^{7}	6
7	(Italy) A Pellegrino	2	2
2	(Argentina) F Comesaña	6	6

Semifinals
(Chinese Taipei) C-h Tseng	4	6	6
2	(Argentina) F Comesaña	6	1	3
