= 2010 San Marino CEPU Open – Singles =

Singles
- 2010 San Marino CEPU Open

Final
- Champion: (Netherlands) Robin Haase
- Runner-up: (Italy) Filippo Volandri
- Score: 6–2, 7–6(8)

Events
Singles	Doubles
← 2009 ·	San Marino CEPU Open	· 2011 →

Andreas Seppi was the defending champion but decided not to participate this year.
Robin Haase won the title, defeating Filippo Volandri 6–2, 7–6(8) in the finals.

== Seeds ==
1. (Italy) Potito Starace (semifinals)
2. (Belgium) Olivier Rochus (second round, retired)
3. (Spain) Pere Riba (quarterfinals)
4. (Portugal) Frederico Gil (second round)
5. (Argentina) Carlos Berlocq (quarterfinals)
6. (Italy) Simone Bolelli (second round)
7. (Italy) Filippo Volandri (final)
8. (France) Édouard Roger-Vasselin (first round)

== Draw ==
=== Key ===
- Q = Qualifier
- WC = Wild card
- LL = Lucky loser
- Alt = Alternate
- SE = Special exempt
- PR = Protected ranking
- ITF = ITF entry
- JE = Junior exempt
- w/o = Walkover
- r = Retired
- d = Defaulted
- SR = Special ranking

=== Finals ===
Semifinals
1	(Italy) Potito Starace	4	3
(Netherlands) Robin Haase	6	6
7	(Italy) Filippo Volandri	7	3	6
WC	(Italy) Flavio Cipolla	6^{4}	6	2

Final
(Netherlands) Robin Haase	6	7
7	(Italy) Filippo Volandri	2	6^{8}

=== Top half ===
First round
1	(Italy) P Starace	7	6
Q	(Serbia) N Ćirić	6^{5}	3
(Argentina) D Junqueira	6	7
(Netherlands) T Schoorel	1	6^{0}
(France) J Dasnières de Veigy	6	6
(Serbia) F Krajinović	3	2
Q	(Italy) A Arnaboldi	3	4
5	(Argentina) C Berlocq	6	6
4	(Portugal) F Gil	6	6
(Belgium) R Bemelmans	2	0
(Portugal) R Machado	6	3	7
(Argentina) M Alund	1	6	5
(Argentina) M González	6	7
(Italy) S Galvani	3	6^{6}
(Netherlands) R Haase	2	6	6
8	(France) É Roger-Vasselin	6	4	1

Second round
1	(Italy) P Starace	6	6
(Argentina) D Junqueira	3	3
(France) J Dasnières de Veigy	1	2
5	(Argentina) C Berlocq	6	6
4	(Portugal) F Gil	4	1
(Portugal) R Machado	6	6
(Argentina) M González	2	6	3
(Netherlands) R Haase	6	3	6

Quarterfinals
1	(Italy) P Starace	6	6
5	(Argentina) C Berlocq	4	4
(Portugal) R Machado	2	2
(Netherlands) R Haase	6	6

Semifinals
1	(Italy) P Starace	4	3
(Netherlands) R Haase	6	6

=== Bottom half ===
First round
7	(Italy) F Volandri	6	2	6
(Belgium) C Rochus	4	6	3
WC	(San Marino) D Zonzini	1	2
Q	(Slovenia) J Semrajc	6	6
WC	(Italy) D Bracciali	3	4
WC	(Italy) M Trevisan	6	6
SE	(Portugal) L Tavares	3	4
3	(Spain) P Riba	6	6
6	(Italy) S Bolelli	7	3	7
(Czech Republic) D Lojda	5	6	6^{5}
(Chile) J Aguilar	5	7	6
(Romania) A Ungur	7	5	3
WC	(Italy) F Cipolla	6	1
Q	(Italy) A Virgili	2	0	r
(Italy) A di Mauro	2	0
2	(Belgium) O Rochus	6	6

Second round
7	(Italy) F Volandri	6	6^{7}	7
Q	(Slovenia) J Semrajc	3	7	6^{3}
WC	(Italy) M Trevisan	2	3
3	(Spain) P Riba	6	6
6	(Italy) S Bolelli	6	3	4
(Chile) J Aguilar	4	6	6
WC	(Italy) F Cipolla	3	7
2	(Belgium) O Rochus	6	6^{0}	r

Quarterfinals
7	(Italy) F Volandri	5	6	6
3	(Spain) P Riba	7	4	4
(Chile) J Aguilar	6^{1}	0
WC	(Italy) F Cipolla	7	6

Semifinals
7	(Italy) F Volandri	7	3	6
WC	(Italy) F Cipolla	6^{4}	6	2
