= 2013 San Marino CEPU Open – Doubles =

Doubles
- 2013 San Marino CEPU Open

Final
- Champions: (United States) Nicholas Monroe (Germany) Simon Stadler
- Runners-up: (Italy) Daniele Bracciali (Romania) Florin Mergea
- Score: 6–2, 6–4

Events
Singles	Doubles
← 2012 ·	San Marino CEPU Open	· 2014 →

Lukáš Dlouhý and Michal Mertiňák were the defending champions, but Dlouhý chose not to compete. Mertiňák played with Mikhail Elgin but lost to eventual runners-up Daniele Bracciali and Florin Mergea. Nicholas Monroe and Simon Stadler won the title 6–2, 6–4 over Bracciali and Mergea.

== Seeds ==
1. (Australia) Paul Hanley / (Australia) John Peers (semifinals)
2. (United States) Nicholas Monroe / (Germany) Simon Stadler (champion)
3. (Italy) Daniele Bracciali / (Romania) Florin Mergea (final)
4. (South Africa) Raven Klaasen / (Germany) Philipp Marx (first round)

== Draw ==
=== Key ===
- Q = Qualifier
- WC = Wild card
- LL = Lucky loser
- Alt = Alternate
- SE = Special exempt
- PR = Protected ranking
- ITF = ITF entry
- JE = Junior exempt
- w/o = Walkover
- r = Retired
- d = Defaulted
- SR = Special ranking

=== Draw ===
First round
1	(Australia) P Hanley (Australia) J Peers	4	6	[10]
(Serbia) N Ćirić (Serbia) D Lajović	6	1	[4]
WC	(Italy) G Quinzi (Italy) A Virgili	2	6	[10]
(Slovakia) A Martin (Czech Republic) J Mertl	6	3	[4]
3	(Italy) D Bracciali (Romania) F Mergea	6	6
(Italy) A Motti (Romania) A Ungur	2	2
(Croatia) M Draganja (Croatia) M Pavić	6^{3}	2
(Russia) M Elgin (Slovakia) M Mertiňák	7^{7}	6
(Croatia) F Škugor (Serbia) G Tošić	6	6
(Australia) C Ebelthite (Chinese Taipei) H-h Lee	4	4
(Germany) C Kas (Austria) O Marach	6	6
4	(South Africa) R Klaasen (Germany) P Marx	1	4
WC	(United States) Sam Barnett (United States) K Kim	1	2
WC	(Italy) M Cecchinato (Italy) A di Mauro	6	6
(Netherlands) J Huta Galung (Australia) J Kerr	2	4
2	(United States) N Monroe (Germany) S Stadler	6	6

Quarterfinals
1	(Australia) P Hanley (Australia) J Peers	7^{7}	4	[10]
WC	(Italy) G Quinzi (Italy) A Virgili	6^{5}	6	[4]
3	(Italy) D Bracciali (Romania) F Mergea	4	6	[10]
(Russia) M Elgin (Slovakia) M Mertiňák	6	3	[4]
(Croatia) F Škugor (Serbia) G Tošić	4	4
(Germany) C Kas (Austria) O Marach	6	6
(Italy) M Cecchinato (Italy) A di Mauro	3	6	[9]
2	(United States) N Monroe (Germany) S Stadler	6	3	[11]

Semifinals
1	(Australia) P Hanley (Australia) J Peers	4	4
3	(Italy) D Bracciali (Romania) F Mergea	6	6
(Germany) C Kas (Austria) O Marach	4	2
2	(United States) N Monroe (Germany) S Stadler	6	6

Final
3	(Italy) D Bracciali (Romania) F Mergea	2	4
2	(United States) N Monroe (Germany) S Stadler	6	6
