= 2026 San Marino Open – Singles =

Singles
- 2026 San Marino Open

Final
- Champion: (Argentina) Facundo Díaz Acosta
- Runner-up: (Croatia) Mili Poljičak
- Score: 6–1, 6–4

Events
| Singles | Doubles |
- San Marino Open

Lukáš Klein was the defending champion but chose not to defend his title.

Facundo Díaz Acosta won the title after defeating Mili Poljičak 6–1, 6–4 in the final.

== Seeds ==
1. (Argentina) Facundo Díaz Acosta (champion)
2. (Finland) Otto Virtanen (second round)
3. (Lithuania) Vilius Gaubas (semifinals)
4. (Georgia (country)) Nikoloz Basilashvili (second round)
5. (France) Alexandre Müller (quarterfinals)
6. (Italy) Andrea Pellegrino (second round)
7. (Bolivia) Hugo Dellien (second round, retired)
8. (Italy) Francesco Maestrelli (second round)

== Draw ==
Key

- Q = Qualifier
- WC = Wild card
- LL = Lucky loser
- Alt = Alternate
- ITF = ITF entry
- PR = Protected ranking
- SR = Special ranking
- SE = Special exempt
- JE = Junior exempt
- JR = Junior Accelerator Programme entrant
- CO = College Accelerator Programme entrant
- NG = Next Gen Accelerator Program entrant
- w/o = Walkover
- r = Retired
- d = Defaulted

=== Finals ===
Semifinals
1 | (Argentina) Facundo Díaz Acosta | 6 | 6
3 | (Lithuania) Vilius Gaubas | 2 | 3
Q | (Croatia) Mili Poljičak | 7 | 6
Q | (Peru) Juan Pablo Varillas | 5 | 4

Final
1 | (Argentina) Facundo Díaz Acosta | 6 | 6
Q | (Croatia) Mili Poljičak | 1 | 4

=== Top half ===
First round
1 | (Argentina) F Díaz Acosta | 6 | 6
Q | (Italy) Tommaso Compagnucci | 4 | 2
PR | (Argentina) F Coria | 4 | 2
LL | (Italy) F Forti | 6 | 6
Alt | (Spain) D Rincón | 4 | 7^{7} | 3
(Bolivia) JC Prado Ángelo | 6 | 6^{5} | 6
(Spain) P Martínez | 1 | 4
7 | (Bolivia) H Dellien | 6 | 6
3 | (Lithuania) V Gaubas | 6 | 7
(France) L Pavlovic | 1 | 5
(Argentina) GA Olivieri | 6 | 6
(Spain) C Taberner | 4 | 1
Q | (Brazil) T Monteiro | 7 | 7
(Spain) D Jordà Sanchis | 5 | 5
WC | (Italy) CA Caniato | 4 | 0
6 | (Italy) A Pellegrino | 6 | 6

Second round
1 | (Argentina) F Díaz Acosta | 6 | 7^{7}
LL | (Italy) F Forti | 2 | 6^{3}
(Bolivia) JC Prado Ángelo | 7^{7} | 0
7 | (Bolivia) H Dellien | 6^{4} | 0^{r}
3 | (Lithuania) V Gaubas | 6 | 6
(Argentina) GA Olivieri | 2 | 3
Q | (Brazil) T Monteiro | 6 | 6
6 | (Italy) A Pellegrino | 3 | 2

Quarterfinals
1 | (Argentina) F Díaz Acosta | 6 | 4 | 6
(Bolivia) JC Prado Ángelo | 2 | 6 | 1
3 | (Lithuania) V Gaubas | 7^{9} | 7^{7}
Q | (Brazil) T Monteiro | 6^{7} | 6^{5}

Semifinals
1 | (Argentina) F Díaz Acosta | 6 | 6
3 | (Lithuania) V Gaubas | 2 | 3

=== Bottom half ===
First round
5 | (France) A Müller | 6 | 6
(Italy) S Napolitano | 2 | 4
(Italy) M Cecchinato | 6 | 6
Alt | (Italy) F Agamenone | 3 | 4
Q | (Croatia) M Poljičak | 7^{8} | 7^{7}
Q | (Italy) E Dalla Valle | 6^{6} | 6^{2}
Q | (Czech Republic) M Vrbenský | 3 | 6 | 2
4 | (Georgia (country)) N Basilashvili | 6 | 3 | 6
8 | (Italy) F Maestrelli | 6 | 6
(Austria) L Neumayer | 4 | 0
WC | (Italy) J Vasamì | 2 | 2
Q | (Peru) JP Varillas | 6 | 6
(Kazakhstan) T Skatov | 6 | 7^{10}
NG | (France) T Faurel | 1 | 6^{8}
WC | (Italy) F Romano | 5 | 4
2 | (Finland) O Virtanen | 7 | 6

Second round
5 | (France) A Müller | 4 | 6 | 7
(Italy) M Cecchinato | 6 | 2 | 5
Q | (Croatia) M Poljičak | 6^{8} | 6 | 6
4 | (Georgia (country)) N Basilashvili | 7^{10} | 3 | 4
8 | (Italy) F Maestrelli | 6^{5} | 6 | 3
Q | (Peru) JP Varillas | 7^{7} | 4 | 6
(Kazakhstan) T Skatov | 6 | 6
2 | (Finland) O Virtanen | 2 | 4

Quarterfinals
5 | (France) A Müller | 6^{3} | 7^{7} | 5
Q | (Croatia) M Poljičak | 7^{7} | 6^{4} | 7
Q | (Peru) JP Varillas | 6 | 6
(Kazakhstan) T Skatov | 4 | 4

Semifinals
Q | (Croatia) M Poljičak | 7 | 6
Q | (Peru) JP Varillas | 5 | 4
