= 2011 San Marino CEPU Open – Doubles =

Doubles
- 2011 San Marino CEPU Open

Final
- Champions: (United States) James Cerretani (Germany) Philipp Marx
- Runners-up: (Italy) Daniele Bracciali (Austria) Julian Knowle
- Score: 6–3, 6–4

Events
| Singles | Doubles |
| ← 2010 · | San Marino CEPU Open | · 2012 → |

Daniele Bracciali and Lovro Zovko are the defending champions; however, they chose not to compete together.
Bracciali played with Julian Knowle and Zovko partnered with Dustin Brown.

James Cerretani and Philipp Marx won the title, defeating Bracciali and Knowle 6–3, 6–4 in the final.

== Seeds ==
1. (Italy) Daniele Bracciali / (Austria) Julian Knowle (final)
2. (United States) James Cerretani / (Germany) Philipp Marx (champions)
3. (Germany) Dustin Brown / (Croatia) Lovro Zovko (first round)
4. (United Kingdom) Jamie Delgado / (United Kingdom) Jonathan Marray (quarterfinals)

== Draw ==
=== Key ===
- Q = Qualifier
- WC = Wild card
- LL = Lucky loser
- Alt = Alternate
- SE = Special exempt
- PR = Protected ranking
- ITF = ITF entry
- JE = Junior exempt
- w/o = Walkover
- r = Retired
- d = Defaulted
- SR = Special ranking

=== Draw ===
First round
1 | (Italy) D Bracciali (Austria) J Knowle | 6 | 3 | [11]
(Sweden) J Brunström (Sweden) A Siljeström | 2 | 6 | [9]
(France) D Guez (France) B Paire | 5 | 1
(Brazil) F Ferreiro (Spain) P Riba | 7 | 6
3 | (Germany) D Brown (Croatia) L Zovko | 2 | 4
(Italy) P Lorenzi (Germany) M Zverev | 6 | 6
(Czech Republic) I Minář (Czech Republic) D Škoch | 3 | 5
WC | (Italy) A Brizzi (Italy) M Crugnola | 6 | 7
(Germany) D Gremelmayr (Germany) B Phau | 4 | 7^{7} | [10]
(Netherlands) J Huta Galung (Netherlands) R Wassen | 6 | 6^{5} | [8]
(Slovakia) M Kližan (Italy) A Motti | 3 | 2
4 | (United Kingdom) J Delgado (United Kingdom) J Marray | 6 | 6
WC | (Monaco) B Balleret (Greece) A Jakupovic | 6 | 4 | [10]
(Australia) C Ebelthite (Australia) A Feeney | 3 | 6 | [4]
WC | (Italy) S Galvani (Italy) D Giorgini | 2 | 1
2 | (United States) J Cerretani (Germany) P Marx | 6 | 6

Quarterfinals
1 | (Italy) D Bracciali (Austria) J Knowle | 7^{8} | 6
(Brazil) F Ferreiro (Spain) P Riba | 6^{6} | 4
(Italy) P Lorenzi (Germany) M Zverev | 3 | 3
WC | (Italy) A Brizzi (Italy) M Crugnola | 6 | 6
(Germany) D Gremelmayr (Germany) B Phau | 7^{7} | 7
4 | (United Kingdom) J Delgado (United Kingdom) J Marray | 6^{5} | 5
WC | (Monaco) B Balleret (Greece) A Jakupovic | 5 | 3
2 | (United States) J Cerretani (Germany) P Marx | 7 | 6

Semifinals
1 | (Italy) D Bracciali (Austria) J Knowle | 6 | 6
WC | (Italy) A Brizzi (Italy) M Crugnola | 1 | 3
(Germany) D Gremelmayr (Germany) B Phau
2 | (United States) J Cerretani (Germany) P Marx | w/o

Final
1 | (Italy) D Bracciali (Austria) J Knowle | 3 | 4
2 | (United States) J Cerretani (Germany) P Marx | 6 | 6
