= 2012 San Marino CEPU Open – Singles =

Singles
- 2012 San Marino CEPU Open

Final
- Champion: (Slovakia) Martin Kližan
- Runner-up: (Italy) Simone Bolelli
- Score: 6–3, 6–1

Events
Singles	Doubles
← 2011 ·	San Marino CEPU Open	· 2013 →

Potito Starace is the defending champion, but lost in the first round.
Martin Kližan won the title, defeating Simone Bolelli 6–3, 6–1 in the final.

== Seeds ==
1. (Slovakia) Martin Kližan (champion)
2. (Slovenia) Blaž Kavčič (quarterfinals)
3. (Italy) Filippo Volandri (semifinals)
4. (Spain) Albert Montañés (semifinals)
5. (Brazil) Rogério Dutra da Silva (quarterfinals)
6. (Italy) Simone Bolelli (final)
7. (Spain) Daniel Gimeno-Traver (first round)
8. (Italy) Potito Starace (first round)

== Draw ==
=== Key ===
- Q = Qualifier
- WC = Wild card
- LL = Lucky loser
- Alt = Alternate
- SE = Special exempt
- PR = Protected ranking
- ITF = ITF entry
- JE = Junior exempt
- w/o = Walkover
- r = Retired
- d = Defaulted
- SR = Special ranking

=== Finals ===
Semifinals
1	(Slovakia) Martin Kližan	6	6
3	(Italy) Filippo Volandri	3	2
4	(Spain) Albert Montañés	7^{7}	4	5
6	(Italy) Simone Bolelli	6^{5}	6	7

Final
1	(Slovakia) Martin Kližan	6	6
6	(Italy) Simone Bolelli	3	1

=== Top half ===
First round
1	(Slovakia) M Kližan	6	6
(Colombia) A González	4	3
(Italy) M Viola	2	6	4
(Slovakia) P Červenák	6	1	6
WC	(Italy) S Galvani	4	6	3
WC	(Italy) A di Mauro	6	1	6
(Croatia) N Mektić	6	6^{4}	6
8	(Italy) P Starace	2	7^{7}	4
3	(Italy) F Volandri	6	6
(Russia) A Kuznetsov	3	4
(Bosnia and Herzegovina) D Džumhur	1	2
(Argentina) M Alund	6	6
Q	(Chile) G Hormazábal	3	6^{2}
Q	(Italy) Claudio Grassi	6	7^{7}
Q	(France) S Robert	2	6	6
7	(Spain) D Gimeno-Traver	6	4	4

Second round
1	(Slovakia) M Kližan	6	6
(Slovakia) P Červenák	1	1
WC	(Italy) A di Mauro	4	1
(Croatia) N Mektić	6	6
3	(Italy) F Volandri	3	6	6
(Argentina) M Alund	6	1	3
Q	(Italy) C Grassi	3	3
Q	(France) S Robert	6	6

Quarterfinals
1	(Slovakia) M Kližan	6	6
(Croatia) N Mektić	3	3
3	(Italy) F Volandri	6	7^{7}
Q	(France) S Robert	4	6^{5}

Semifinals
1	(Slovakia) M Kližan	6	6
3	(Italy) F Volandri	3	2

=== Bottom half ===
First round
5	(Brazil) R Dutra da Silva	6	6^{1}	6
WC	(Italy) W Trusendi	2	7^{7}	1
Q	(Netherlands) Miliaan Niesten	0	6	7
(Croatia) A Veić	6	4	5
(Brazil) L Kirche	6	6^{9}	6
(Czech Republic) Marek Michalička	4	7^{11}	3
(Turkey) M İlhan	1	1
4	(Spain) A Montañés	6	6
6	(Italy) S Bolelli	6	6
(Netherlands) M Middelkoop	3	2
(Croatia) F Škugor	6	6^{3}	r
WC	(Chile) N Massú	3	7^{7}
(Portugal) P Sousa	6	1	6
(Italy) G Naso	3	6	1
(Brazil) J Silva	0	3
2	(Slovenia) B Kavčič	6	6

Second round
5	(Brazil) R Dutra da Silva	7	6
Q	(Netherlands) M Niesten	5	3
(Brazil) L Kirche	4	2
4	(Spain) A Montañés	6	6
6	(Italy) S Bolelli	6	6
WC	(Chile) N Massú	0	2
(Portugal) P Sousa	4	5
2	(Slovenia) B Kavčič	6	7

Quarterfinals
5	(Brazil) R Dutra da Silva	5	2
4	(Spain) A Montañés	7	6
6	(Italy) S Bolelli	6	7^{7}
2	(Slovenia) B Kavčič	1	6^{5}

Semifinals
4	(Spain) A Montañés	7^{7}	4	5
6	(Italy) S Bolelli	6^{5}	6	7
