= 2010 San Marino CEPU Open – Doubles =

2010 doubles tennis tournament held in San Marino

Doubles
- 2010 San Marino CEPU Open

Final
- Champions: (Italy) Daniele Bracciali (Croatia) Lovro Zovko
- Runners-up: (Switzerland) Yves Allegro (United States) James Cerretani
- Score: 3–6, 6–2, [10–5]

Events
Singles	Doubles
← 2009 ·	San Marino CEPU Open	· 2011 →

Lucas Arnold Ker and Sebastián Prieto were the defending champions, but only Prieto tried to defend his title.
He partnered with Máximo González, but they were eliminated by Flavio Cipolla and Stefano Galvani already in the first round.
Daniele Bracciali and Lovro Zovko won the title, defeating Yves Allegro and James Cerretani 3–6, 6–2, [10–5] in the finals.

== Seeds ==
1. (Italy) Daniele Bracciali / (Croatia) Lovro Zovko (champions)
2. (Switzerland) Yves Allegro / (United States) James Cerretani (finals)
3. (Argentina) Carlos Berlocq / (Portugal) Frederico Gil (semifinals)
4. (Argentina) Máximo González / (Argentina) Sebastián Prieto (first round)

== Draw ==
=== Key ===
- Q = Qualifier
- WC = Wild card
- LL = Lucky loser
- Alt = Alternate
- SE = Special exempt
- PR = Protected ranking
- ITF = ITF entry
- JE = Junior exempt
- w/o = Walkover
- r = Retired
- d = Defaulted
- SR = Special ranking

=== Draw ===
First round
1	(Italy) D Bracciali (Croatia) L Zovko	7	0	[10]
(Portugal) R Machado (Portugal) L Tavares	6^{5}	6	[6]
(Chile) J Aguilar (Argentina) D Junqueira	6	6
WC	(Italy) M Trevisan (San Marino) D Zonzini	4	0
3	(Argentina) C Berlocq (Portugal) F Gil	6	6
(Belgium) C Rochus (Belgium) O Rochus	2	4
(Italy) A di Mauro (Italy) A Motti	5	5
WC	(Italy) F Aldi (Italy) A Arnaboldi	7	7
(Serbia) F Krajinović (Montenegro) G Tošić	7	2	[10]
(Belgium) R Bemelmans (Czech Republic) D Lojda	5	6	[7]
WC	(Italy) F Cipolla (Italy) S Galvani	7	6
4	(Argentina) M González (Argentina) S Prieto	6^{4}	1
(Argentina) M Alund (Colombia) A González	6	3	[8]
(Netherlands) R Haase (Netherlands) T Schoorel	4	6	[10]
(Romania) A Ungur (Italy) F Volandri	4	2
2	(Switzerland) Y Allegro (United States) J Cerretani	6	6

Quarterfinals
1	(Italy) D Bracciali (Croatia) L Zovko	6	4	[10]
(Chile) J Aguilar (Argentina) D Junqueira	3	6	[3]
3	(Argentina) C Berlocq (Portugal) F Gil	6	6
WC	(Italy) F Aldi (Italy) A Arnaboldi	3	2
(Serbia) F Krajinović (Montenegro) G Tošić	w/o
WC	(Italy) F Cipolla (Italy) S Galvani
(Netherlands) R Haase (Netherlands) T Schoorel	2	6	[5]
2	(Switzerland) Y Allegro (United States) J Cerretani	6	1	[10]

Semifinals
1	(Italy) D Bracciali (Croatia) L Zovko	2	6	[10]
3	(Argentina) C Berlocq (Portugal) F Gil	6	4	[6]
WC	(Italy) F Cipolla (Italy) S Galvani	5	3
2	(Switzerland) Y Allegro (United States) J Cerretani	7	6

Finals
1	(Italy) D Bracciali (Croatia) L Zovko	2	6	[10]
2	(Switzerland) Y Allegro (United States) J Cerretani	6	2	[5]
