= 2022 San Marino Open =

- Date: 8–14 August
- Edition: 29th
- Location: City of San Marino, San Marino

Champions

Singles
- Pavel Kotov

Doubles
- (Italy) Marco Bortolotti / (Spain) Sergio Martos Gornés
← 2021 ·	San Marino Open	· 2023 →

The 2022 San Marino Open was a professional tennis tournament played on clay courts. The 29th edition of the tournament, which was part of the 2022 ATP Challenger Tour, took place in City of San Marino, San Marino between 8 and 14 August 2022.

== Singles main-draw entrants ==
=== Seeds ===
Country	Player	Rank^{1}	Seed
ESP	Carlos Taberner	107	1
	Pavel Kotov	132	2
ITA	Giulio Zeppieri	136	3
ITA	Flavio Cobolli	138	4
ITA	Marco Cecchinato	140	5
FRA	Alexandre Müller	157	6
CRO	Nino Serdarušić	180	7
ITA	Matteo Arnaldi	215	8

- ^{1} Rankings are as of 1 August 2022.

=== Other entrants ===
The following players received wildcards into the singles main draw:

- (Italy) Mattia Bellucci
- (Italy) Flavio Cobolli
- (Latvia) Ernests Gulbis

The following players received entry into the singles main draw as alternates:

- Ivan Gakhov
- (France) Maxime Janvier
- (Romania) Filip Cristian Jianu

The following players received entry from the qualifying draw:

- (Norway) Viktor Durasovic
- (Italy) Francesco Forti
- (Austria) Lukas Neumayer
- (Ukraine) Oleg Prihodko
- (Monaco) Valentin Vacherot
- (Italy) Alexander Weis

== Champions ==
=== Singles ===
- Pavel Kotov def. (Italy) Matteo Arnaldi 7–6^{(7–5)}, 6–4.

=== Doubles ===
- (Italy) Marco Bortolotti / (Spain) Sergio Martos Gornés def. (Serbia) Ivan Sabanov / (Serbia) Matej Sabanov 6–4, 6–4.
