= 2026 San Marino Open – Doubles =

Doubles
- 2026 San Marino Open

Final
- Champions: (Serbia) Stefan Latinović (Croatia) Mili Poljičak
- Runners-up: (France) Arthur Reymond (France) Luca Sanchez
- Score: 7–6^{(7–5)}, 6–3

Events
Singles	Doubles
- San Marino Open

Karol Drzewiecki and Ray Ho were the defending champions but chose not to defend their title.

Stefan Latinović and Mili Poljičak won the title after defeating Arthur Reymond and Luca Sanchez 7–6^{(7–5)}, 6–3 in the final.

== Seeds ==
1. (Czech Republic) Petr Nouza / (Austria) Neil Oberleitner (quarterfinals)
2. (United Kingdom) Luke Johnson / (Netherlands) Bart Stevens (quarterfinals)
3. (Netherlands) Sander Arends / (Netherlands) David Pel (first round)
4. (Belgium) Sander Gillé / (Netherlands) Sem Verbeek (first round)

== Draw ==
Key

- Q = Qualifier
- WC = Wild card
- LL = Lucky loser
- Alt = Alternate
- ITF = ITF entry
- PR = Protected ranking
- SR = Special ranking
- SE = Special exempt
- JE = Junior exempt
- JR = Junior Accelerator Programme entrant
- CO = College Accelerator Programme entrant
- NG = Next Gen Accelerator Program entrant
- w/o = Walkover
- r = Retired
- d = Defaulted

First round
1	(Czech Republic) P Nouza (Austria) N Oberleitner	7	6
(Romania) A Jecan (Romania) B Pavel	5	4
(France) A Reymond (France) L Sanchez	6^{6}	7	[12]
(Spain) S Martos Gornés (Poland) S Walków	7^{8}	5	[10]
4	(Belgium) S Gillé (Netherlands) S Verbeek	5	4
(Netherlands) T Loof (Japan) K Uesugi	7	6
WC	(Italy) Alberto Bronzetti (Italy) Manuel Mazza	5	2
WC	(Italy) F Romano (Italy) J Vasamì	7	6
(Czech Republic) F Duda (Czech Republic) M Vrbenský	7^{7}	6^{0}	[10]
(Bolivia) B Arias (Denmark) J Ingildsen	6^{3}	7^{7}	[5]
(Serbia) S Latinović (Croatia) M Poljičak	7	6
3	(Netherlands) S Arends (Netherlands) D Pel	5	1
(Bolivia) JC Prado Ángelo (Bolivia) F Zeballos	6^{3}	6^{3}
(Poland) P Matuszewski (Poland) F Pieczonka	7^{7}	7^{7}
(India) S Banthia (Bulgaria) A Donski	6	2	[7]
2	(United Kingdom) L Johnson (Netherlands) B Stevens	3	6	[10]

Quarterfinals
1	(Czech Republic) P Nouza (Austria) N Oberleitner	7^{7}	1	[8]
(France) A Reymond (France) L Sanchez	6^{2}	6	[10]
(Netherlands) T Loof (Japan) K Uesugi	3	6	[10]
WC	(Italy) F Romano (Italy) J Vasamì	6	1	[3]
(Czech Republic) F Duda (Czech Republic) M Vrbenský	3	4
(Serbia) S Latinović (Croatia) M Poljičak	6	6
(Poland) P Matuszewski (Poland) F Pieczonka	6	6
2	(United Kingdom) L Johnson (Netherlands) B Stevens	4	4

Semifinals
(France) A Reymond (France) L Sanchez	7^{9}	6
(Netherlands) T Loof (Japan) K Uesugi	6^{7}	4
(Serbia) S Latinović (Croatia) M Poljičak	6	7^{7}
(Poland) P Matuszewski (Poland) F Pieczonka	3	6^{4}

Final
(France) A Reymond (France) L Sanchez	6^{5}	3
(Serbia) S Latinović (Croatia) M Poljičak	7^{7}	6
