= 2009 San Marino CEPU Open – Singles =

Singles
- 2009 San Marino CEPU Open

Final
- Champion: (Italy) Andreas Seppi
- Runner-up: (Italy) Potito Starace
- Score: 7–6(4), 2–6, 6–4

Events
Singles	Doubles
← 2008 ·	San Marino CEPU Open	· 2010 →

Filippo Volandri was the defending champion, but he lost to Daniel Köllerer in the second round.
Andreas Seppi defeated Potito Starace 7–6(4), 2–6, 6–4 in the final.

== Seeds ==
1. (Italy) Andreas Seppi (champion)
2. (Spain) Óscar Hernández (second round)
3. (Germany) Björn Phau (second round)
4. (Romania) Victor Crivoi (first round)
5. (Austria) Daniel Köllerer (semifinals)
6. (Spain) Daniel Gimeno-Traver (second round)
7. (Belgium) Olivier Rochus (second round)
8. (Spain) Alberto Martín(first round)

== Draw ==
=== Key ===
- Q = Qualifier
- WC = Wild card
- LL = Lucky loser
- Alt = Alternate
- SE = Special exempt
- PR = Protected ranking
- ITF = ITF entry
- JE = Junior exempt
- w/o = Walkover
- r = Retired
- d = Defaulted
- SR = Special ranking

=== Final four ===
Semifinals
1/WC	(Italy) Andreas Seppi	6^{1}	6	6
5	(Austria) Daniel Köllerer	7	1	2
(Italy) Potito Starace	6	6
(Ukraine) Oleksandr Dolgopolov Jr.	3	0

Final
1/WC	(Italy) Andreas Seppi	7	2	6
(Italy) Potito Starace	6^{4}	6	4

=== Top half ===
First round
1/WC	(Italy) A Seppi	6	4	6
WC	(Argentina) G Gaudio	0	6	0
Q	(Czech Republic) D Lojda	5	6^{7}
(Argentina) S Decoud	7	7
Q	(Italy) G Naso	4	3
(Argentina) S Roitman	6	6
(Italy) A di Mauro	4	1
6	(Spain) D Gimeno-Traver	6	6
3	(Germany) B Phau	7	6
WC	(Italy) D Bracciali	6^{5}	4
(Portugal) R Machado	6	6
(Argentina) B Dabul	1	4
(Italy) T Tenconi	1	2
(Italy) F Volandri	6	6
WC	(Italy) S Galvani	2	4
5	(Austria) D Köllerer	6	6

Second round
1/WC	(Italy) A Seppi	6	6^{2}	6
(Argentina) S Decoud	3	7	4
(Argentina) S Roitman	6	6
6	(Spain) D Gimeno-Traver	3	4
3	(Germany) B Phau	1	2
(Portugal) R Machado	6	6
(Italy) F Volandri	1	3
5	(Austria) D Köllerer	6	6

Quarterfinals
1/WC	(Italy) A Seppi	6	6
(Argentina) S Roitman	3	2
(Portugal) R Machado	3	3
5	(Austria) D Köllerer	6	6

Semifinals
1/WC	(Italy) A Seppi	6^{1}	6	6
5	(Austria) D Köllerer	7	1	2

=== Bottom half ===
First round
7	(Belgium) O Rochus	6	6
Q	(Czech Republic) L Rosol	2	1
(Spain) P Andújar	3	2
(Italy) P Starace	6	6
(Slovakia) D Hrbatý	4	2
(Czech Republic) J Hájek	6	6
(Australia) P Luczak	6	0	6
4	(Romania) V Crivoi	4	6	3
8	(Spain) A Martín	6^{5}	7	4
(Spain) P Riba	7	6^{7}	6
(Italy) P Lorenzi	6	4	3
Q	(Argentina) M Alund	3	6	6
SE	(Ukraine) O Dolgopolov Jr.	0	7	6
SE	(Netherlands) T de Bakker	6	6^{8}	4
(Italy) M Crugnola	3	3
2	(Spain) Ó Hernández	6	6

Second round
7	(Belgium) O Rochus	6^{5}	6^{1}
(Italy) P Starace	7	7
(Czech Republic) J Hájek	1	4
(Australia) P Luczak	6	6
(Spain) P Riba	6	6
Q	(Argentina) M Alund	3	2
SE	(Ukraine) O Dolgopolov Jr.	7	4	6
2	(Spain) Ó Hernández	5	6	3

Quarterfinals
(Italy) P Starace	6	3	6
(Australia) P Luczak	3	6	3
(Spain) P Riba	6^{4}	3
SE	(Ukraine) O Dolgopolov Jr.	7	6

Semifinals
(Italy) P Starace	6	6
SE	(Ukraine) O Dolgopolov Jr.	3	0
