= 2025 San Marino Open – Doubles =

Doubles
- 2025 San Marino Open

Final
- Champions: (Poland) Karol Drzewiecki (Chinese Taipei) Ray Ho
- Runners-up: (Slovakia) Miloš Karol (Ukraine) Vitaliy Sachko
- Score: 7–5, 7–6^{(7–3)}

Events
Singles	Doubles
- San Marino Open

Petr Nouza and Patrik Rikl were the defending champions but chose not to defend their title.

Karol Drzewiecki and Ray Ho won the title after defeating Miloš Karol and Vitaliy Sachko 7–5, 7–6^{(7–3)} in the final.

== Seeds ==
1. (Poland) Karol Drzewiecki / (Chinese Taipei) Ray Ho (champions)
2. (United States) Patrik Trhac / (United Kingdom) Marcus Willis (quarterfinals)
3. (Ukraine) Denys Molchanov / (Spain) David Vega Hernández (first round)
4. (Argentina) Federico Agustín Gómez / (Venezuela) Luis David Martínez (quarterfinals, withdrew)

== Draw ==
Key

- Q = Qualifier
- WC = Wild card
- LL = Lucky loser
- Alt = Alternate
- ITF = ITF entry
- PR = Protected ranking
- SR = Special ranking
- SE = Special exempt
- JE = Junior exempt
- JR = Junior Accelerator Programme entrant
- CO = College Accelerator Programme entrant
- NG = Next Gen Accelerator Program entrant
- w/o = Walkover
- r = Retired
- d = Defaulted

=== Draw ===
First round
1	(Poland) K Drzewiecki (Chinese Taipei) R Ho	7^{7}	7^{8}
(Austria) D Pichler (Slovakia) L Pokorný	6^{4}	6^{6}
WC	(Italy) CA Caniato (Italy) Lorenzo Carboni	7^{8}	6
(Israel) D Cukierman (Argentina) M Kestelboim	6^{6}	4
3	(Ukraine) D Molchanov (Spain) D Vega Hernández	5	5
(Spain) Í Cervantes (Spain) D Rincón	7	7
(Bolivia) M Dellien (Bolivia) F Zeballos	5	3
(India) S Banthia (Bulgaria) A Donski	7	6
WC	(Italy) F Forti (Italy) Andrea Picchione	6^{4}	3
(Slovakia) M Karol (Ukraine) V Sachko	7^{7}	6
(Romania) A Jecan; I Liutarevich	3	2
4	(Argentina) FA Gómez (Venezuela) LD Martínez	6	6
(Argentina) A Collarini (Argentina) G Villanueva	1	4
(Czech Republic) A Paulson (Czech Republic) M Vrbenský	6	6
(Italy) M Bortolotti (Italy) G Ricca	3	2
2	(United States) P Trhac (United Kingdom) M Willis	6	6

Quarterfinals
1	(Poland) K Drzewiecki (Chinese Taipei) R Ho	6	6^{5}	[10]
WC	(Italy) CA Caniato (Italy) L Carboni	0	7^{7}	[4]
(Spain) Í Cervantes (Spain) D Rincón	6	3	[4]
(India) S Banthia (Bulgaria) A Donski	3	6	[10]
(Slovakia) M Karol (Ukraine) V Sachko	w/o
4	(Argentina) FA Gómez (Venezuela) LD Martínez
(Czech Republic) A Paulson (Czech Republic) M Vrbenský	7	6
2	(United States) P Trhac (United Kingdom) M Willis	5	4

Semifinals
1	(Poland) K Drzewiecki (Chinese Taipei) R Ho	7	6
(India) S Banthia (Bulgaria) A Donski	5	4
(Slovakia) M Karol (Ukraine) V Sachko	6	6
(Czech Republic) A Paulson (Czech Republic) M Vrbenský	4	2

Final
1	(Poland) K Drzewiecki (Chinese Taipei) R Ho	7	7^{7}
(Slovakia) M Karol (Ukraine) V Sachko	5	6^{3}
