= 2009 San Marino CEPU Open – Doubles =

Doubles
- 2009 San Marino CEPU Open

Final
- Champions: (Argentina) Lucas Arnold Ker (Argentina) Sebastián Prieto
- Runners-up: (Sweden) Johan Brunström (Netherlands Antilles) Jean-Julien Rojer
- Score: 7–6(4), 2–6, [10–7]

Events
Singles	Doubles
← 2008 ·	San Marino CEPU Open	· 2010 →

Yves Allegro and Horia Tecău were the defending champions, however they chose to not compete this year.
Lucas Arnold Ker and Sebastián Prieto won this tournament, by defeating Johan Brunström and Jean-Julien Rojer 7–6(4), 2–6, [10–7] in the final.

== Seeds ==
1. (Czech Republic) David Škoch / (Slovakia) Igor Zelenay (semifinals)
2. (Sweden) Johan Brunström / (Netherlands Antilles) Jean-Julien Rojer (final)
3. (Argentina) Lucas Arnold Ker / (Argentina) Sebastián Prieto (champions)
4. (United States) James Cerretani / (United States) Travis Rettenmaier (semifinals)

== Draw ==
=== Key ===
- Q = Qualifier
- WC = Wild card
- LL = Lucky loser
- Alt = Alternate
- SE = Special exempt
- PR = Protected ranking
- ITF = ITF entry
- JE = Junior exempt
- w/o = Walkover
- r = Retired
- d = Defaulted
- SR = Special ranking

=== Draw ===
First round
1	(Czech Republic) D Škoch (Slovakia) I Zelenay	7	6
(Spain) Ó Hernández (Spain) A Martín	6^{4}	3
(Australia) P Luczak (Italy) A Motti	7	4	[3]
(Czech Republic) L Friedl (Czech Republic) J Levinský	5	6	[10]
3	(Argentina) L Arnold Ker (Argentina) S Prieto	6	4	[10]
(Italy) D Bracciali (Italy) P Starace	3	6	[6]
(Spain) P Andújar (Argentina) B Dabul	6	6
WC	(Italy) A di Mauro (Italy) G Naso	2	0
(Serbia) B Pašanski (Belgium) O Rochus	6	6^{3}	[3]
WC	(Italy) M Crugnola (Italy) S Galvani	4	7	[10]
(Germany) P Marx (Czech Republic) L Rosol	1	6	[9]
4	(United States) J Cerretani (United States) T Rettenmaier	6	3	[11]
(United Kingdom) J Delgado (United Kingdom) J Murray	7	1	[10]
(Portugal) R Machado (Argentina) S Roitman	6^{2}	6	[7]
WC	(Italy) A Biasella (Italy) F Gaio	3	2
2	(Sweden) J Brunström (Netherlands Antilles) J-J Rojer	6	6

Quarterfinals
1	(Czech Republic) D Škoch (Slovakia) I Zelenay	6^{9}	6	[15]
(Czech Republic) L Friedl (Czech Republic) J Levinský	7	3	[13]
3	(Argentina) L Arnold Ker (Argentina) S Prieto	6	6
(Spain) P Andújar (Argentina) B Dabul	1	2
WC	(Italy) M Crugnola (Italy) S Galvani	1	6^{5}
4	(United States) J Cerretani (United States) T Rettenmaier	6	7
(United Kingdom) J Delgado (United Kingdom) J Murray	1	6^{0}
2	(Sweden) J Brunström (Netherlands Antilles) J-J Rojer	6	7

Semifinals
1	(Czech Republic) D Škoch (Slovakia) I Zelenay	3	6^{3}
3	(Argentina) L Arnold Ker (Argentina) S Prieto	6	7
4	(United States) J Cerretani (United States) T Rettenmaier	2	3
2	(Sweden) J Brunström (Netherlands Antilles) J-J Rojer	6	6

Finals
3	(Argentina) L Arnold Ker (Argentina) S Prieto	7	2	[10]
2	(Sweden) J Brunström (Netherlands Antilles) J-J Rojer	6^{4}	6	[7]
