= 2012 San Marino CEPU Open – Doubles =

Doubles
- 2012 San Marino CEPU Open

Final
- Champions: (Czech Republic) Lukáš Dlouhý (Slovakia) Michal Mertiňák
- Runners-up: (Italy) Stefano Ianni (Italy) Matteo Viola
- Score: 2–6, 7–6^{(7–3)}, [11–9]

Events
| Singles | Doubles |
| ← 2011 · | San Marino CEPU Open | · 2013 → |

James Cerretani and Philipp Marx were the defending champions, but chose not to compete.
Lukáš Dlouhý and Michal Mertiňák won the title, defeating Stefano Ianni and Matteo Viola 2–6, 7–6^{(7–3)}, [11–9] in the final.

== Seeds ==
1. (Sweden) Johan Brunström / (Russia) Mikhail Elgin (quarterfinals)
2. (Belgium) Dick Norman / (Germany) Alexander Waske (first round)
3. (United States) Nicholas Monroe / (Germany) Simon Stadler (quarterfinals)
4. (Czech Republic) Lukáš Dlouhý / (Slovakia) Michal Mertiňák (champions)

== Draw ==
=== Key ===
- Q = Qualifier
- WC = Wild card
- LL = Lucky loser
- Alt = Alternate
- SE = Special exempt
- PR = Protected ranking
- ITF = ITF entry
- JE = Junior exempt
- w/o = Walkover
- r = Retired
- d = Defaulted
- SR = Special ranking

=== Draw ===
First round
1 | (Sweden) J Brunström (Russia) M Elgin | 6 | 6
WC | (United States) Sam Barnett (United States) K Kim | 1 | 3
(Brazil) R Dutra da Silva (Brazil) L Kirche | 6 | 6
Alt | (Colombia) A González (Brazil) J Silva | 3 | 4
4 | (Czech Republic) L Dlouhý (Slovakia) M Mertiňák | 6 | 5
WC | (San Marino) M De Rossi (Italy) S Galvani | 0 | 1^{r}
(Germany) A Begemann (Slovakia) I Zelenay | 7^{9} | 7
(Belarus) A Bury (Russia) A Kuznetsov | 6^{7} | 5
(Italy) S Ianni (Italy) M Viola | 6 | 6
(Slovenia) B Kavčič (Croatia) F Škugor | 4 | 2
WC | (Italy) Marco Cecchinato (Italy) D Giorgini | 1 | 5
3 | (United States) N Monroe (Germany) S Stadler | 6 | 7
(Italy) A di Mauro (Italy) G Naso | 5 | 3
(Argentina) M Alund (Italy) Claudio Grassi | 7 | 6
(Slovakia) P Červenák (Slovakia) M Kližan | 6^{6} | 7 | [10]
2 | (Belgium) D Norman (Germany) A Waske | 7^{8} | 5 | [6]

Second round
1 | (Sweden) J Brunström (Russia) M Elgin | 2 | 4
(Brazil) R Dutra da Silva (Brazil) L Kirche | 6 | 6
4 | (Czech Republic) L Dlouhý (Slovakia) M Mertiňák | 6 | 7^{7}
(Germany) A Begemann (Slovakia) I Zelenay | 3 | 6^{3}
(Italy) S Ianni (Italy) M Viola | 6 | 6
3 | (United States) N Monroe (Germany) S Stadler | 4 | 3
(Argentina) M Alund (Italy) C Grassi | 6^{4} | 5
(Slovakia) P Červenák (Slovakia) M Kližan | 7^{7} | 7

Semifinals
(Brazil) R Dutra da Silva (Brazil) L Kirche | 1 | 2
4 | (Czech Republic) L Dlouhý (Slovakia) M Mertiňák | 6 | 6
(Italy) S Ianni (Italy) M Viola | 6 | 7
(Slovakia) P Červenák (Slovakia) M Kližan | 4 | 5

Final
4 | (Czech Republic) L Dlouhý (Slovakia) M Mertiňák | 2 | 7^{7} | [11]
(Italy) S Ianni (Italy) M Viola | 6 | 6^{3} | [9]
