= 2013 San Marino CEPU Open =

Professional tennis tournament

- Date: 5 – 11 August
- Edition: 26th
- Surface: Clay
- Location: City of San Marino, San Marino

Champions

Singles
- (Italy) Marco Cecchinato

Doubles
- (Italy) Daniele Bracciali / (Romania) Florin Mergea
← 2012 ·	San Marino CEPU Open	· 2014 →

The 2013 San Marino CEPU Open was a professional tennis tournament plays on clay courts. It was the 26th edition of the tournament which is part of the Tretorn SERIE+ of the 2013 ATP Challenger Tour. It takes place in City of San Marino, San Marino between 5 and 11 August 2013.

== Singles main draw entrants ==
=== Seeds ===
Country	Player	Rank^{1}	Seed
ESP	Daniel Gimeno Traver	62	1
ROU	Adrian Ungur	92	2
FRA	Guillaume Rufin	96	3
CZE	Jiří Veselý	98	4
GER	Jan-Lennard Struff	103	5
ITA	Filippo Volandri	105	6
NED	Jesse Huta Galung	110	7
SLO	Blaž Kavčič	120	8

- ^{1} Rankings are as of July 30, 2013.

=== Other entrants ===
The following players received wildcards into the singles main draw:

- (Italy) Marco Cecchinato
- (Italy) Alessandro Giannessi
- (Italy) Gianluigi Quinzi
- (Italy) Stefano Travaglia

The following players received entry from the qualifying draw:

- (Italy) Federico Gaio
- (Italy) Roberto Marcora
- (Italy) Matteo Trevisan
- (Italy) Adelchi Virgili

== Champions ==
=== Singles ===
- (Italy) Marco Cecchinato def. (Italy) Filippo Volandri 6–3, 6–4

=== Doubles ===
- (United States) Nicholas Monroe / (Germany) Simon Stadler def. (Italy) Daniele Bracciali / (Romania) Florin Mergea 6–2, 6–4
