= 2024 San Marino Open =

- Date: 29 July – 4 August
- Edition: 31st
- Location: City of San Marino, San Marino

Champions

Singles
- (France) Alexandre Müller

Doubles
- (Czech Republic) Petr Nouza / (Czech Republic) Patrik Rikl
- San Marino Open

The 2024 Internazionali di Tennis San Marino Open was a professional tennis tournament played on clay courts. The 31st edition of the tournament, which was part of the 2024 ATP Challenger Tour, took place in City of San Marino, San Marino between 29 July and 4 August 2024.

== Singles main-draw entrants ==
=== Seeds ===
Country	Player	Rank^{1}	Seed
ITA	Fabio Fognini	70	1
ARG	Francisco Comesaña	99	2
FRA	Alexandre Müller	102	3
ESP	Albert Ramos Viñolas	124	4
ITA	Matteo Gigante	149	5
BRA	Gustavo Heide	155	6
ITA	Andrea Pellegrino	156	7
ARG	Juan Manuel Cerúndolo	157	8

- ^{1} Rankings are as of 22 July 2024.

=== Other entrants ===
The following players received wildcards into the singles main draw:

- (Italy) Marco Cecchinato
- (Italy) Fabio Fognini
- (Italy) Andrea Picchione

The following player received entry into the singles main draw as a special exempt:

- (Italy) ~~Federico Arnaboldi~~

The following player received entry into the singles main draw as an alternate:

- (Italy) Alexander Weis

The following players received entry from the qualifying draw:

- (Brazil) Mateus Alves
- (Switzerland) Rémy Bertola
- Kirill Kivattsev
- (Spain) Carlos López Montagud
- (Brazil) João Lucas Reis da Silva
- (Brazil) Pedro Sakamoto

The following players received entry as lucky losers:

- (Brazil) Daniel Dutra da Silva
- (Argentina) Gonzalo Villanueva

== Champions ==
=== Singles ===
- (France) Alexandre Müller def. (Chinese Taipei) Tseng Chun-hsin 6–3, 4–6, 7–6^{(7–3)}.

=== Doubles ===
- (Czech Republic) Petr Nouza / (Czech Republic) Patrik Rikl def. (France) Théo Arribagé / (Brazil) Orlando Luz 1–6, 7–5, [10–6].
