= 2010 San Marino CEPU Open =

- Date: August 2 – August 8
- Edition: 22nd
- Location: City of San Marino, San Marino

Champions

Singles
- (Netherlands) Robin Haase

Doubles
- (Italy) Daniele Bracciali / (Croatia) Lovro Zovko
← 2009 ·	San Marino CEPU Open	· 2011 →

The 2010 San Marino CEPU Open was a professional tennis tournament played on outdoor red clay courts. It was the twenty second edition of the tournament which is part of the Tretorn SERIE+ of the 2010 ATP Challenger Tour. It took place in City of San Marino, San Marino between 2 and 8 August 2010.

== ATP entrants ==
=== Seeds ===
Nationality	Player	Ranking*	Seeding
ITA	Potito Starace	64	1
BEL	Olivier Rochus	66	2
ESP	Pere Riba	73	3
POR	Frederico Gil	83	4
ARG	Carlos Berlocq	101	5
ITA	Simone Bolelli	109	6
ITA	Filippo Volandri	110	7
FRA	Édouard Roger-Vasselin	115	8

- Rankings are as of July 26, 2010.

=== Other entrants ===
The following players received wildcards into the singles main draw:

- (Italy) Daniele Bracciali
- (Italy) Flavio Cipolla
- (Italy) Matteo Trevisan
- (San Marino) Diego Zonzini

The following players received a Special Exempt into the main draw:

- (Portugal) Leonardo Tavares

The following players received entry from the qualifying draw:

- (Italy) Andrea Arnaboldi
- (Serbia) Nikola Ćirić
- (Slovenia) Janez Semrajc
- (Italy) Adelchi Virgili

== Champions ==
=== Singles ===
(Netherlands) Robin Haase def. (Italy) Filippo Volandri, 6–2, 7–6(8)

=== Doubles ===
(Italy) Daniele Bracciali / (Croatia) Lovro Zovko def. (Switzerland) Yves Allegro / (United States) James Cerretani, 3–6, 6–2, [10–5]
