= 2022 San Marino Open – Doubles =

Doubles
- 2022 San Marino Open

Final
- Champions: (Italy) Marco Bortolotti (Spain) Sergio Martos Gornés
- Runners-up: (Serbia) Ivan Sabanov (Serbia) Matej Sabanov
- Score: 6–4, 6–4

Events
Singles	Doubles
- San Marino Open

Zdeněk Kolář and Luis David Martínez were the defending champions but only Martínez chose to defend his title, partnering Fabien Reboul. Martínez lost in the semifinals to Ivan and Matej Sabanov.

Marco Bortolotti and Sergio Martos Gornés won the title after defeating Sabanov and Sabanov 6–4, 6–4 in the final.

== Seeds ==
1. (Venezuela) Luis David Martínez / (France) Fabien Reboul (semifinals)
2. (France) Albano Olivetti / (Brazil) Fernando Romboli (first round)
3. (Serbia) Ivan Sabanov / (Serbia) Matej Sabanov (final)
4. (Czech Republic) Roman Jebavý / (Czech Republic) Adam Pavlásek (first round)

== Draw ==
Key

- Q = Qualifier
- WC = Wild card
- LL = Lucky loser
- Alt = Alternate
- ITF = ITF entry
- PR = Protected ranking
- SR = Special ranking
- SE = Special exempt
- JE = Junior exempt
- JR = Junior Accelerator Programme entrant
- CO = College Accelerator Programme entrant
- NG = Next Gen Accelerator Program entrant
- w/o = Walkover
- r = Retired
- d = Defaulted

First round
1	(Venezuela) LD Martínez (France) F Reboul	6	6^{5}	[10]
(Netherlands) J de Jong (Netherlands) B Stevens	2	7^{7}	[5]
(Spain) O Roca Batalla (Spain) N Sánchez Izquierdo	6	6
Yan Bondarevskiy; P Kotov	4	2
3	(Serbia) I Sabanov (Serbia) M Sabanov	6	6
WC	(Italy) Marco Miceli (Italy) S Napolitano	1	4
(Bolivia) B Arias (Bolivia) F Zeballos	3	2
(Monaco) R Arneodo (Netherlands) S Verbeek	6	6
WC	(San Marino) M De Rossi (Italy) Manuel Mazza	6^{4}	0
(Italy) M Bortolotti (Spain) S Martos Gornés	7^{7}	6
(Norway) V Durasovic (Ukraine) G Kravchenko	7^{7}	6
4	(Czech Republic) R Jebavý (Czech Republic) A Pavlásek	6^{4}	3
(Croatia) M Poljičak (Croatia) N Serdarušić	5	3
(Ukraine) V Manafov (Ukraine) O Prihodko	7	6
(Ukraine) D Molchanov (Slovakia) I Zelenay	7	6
2	(France) A Olivetti (Brazil) F Romboli	5	4

Quarterfinals
1	(Venezuela) LD Martínez (France) F Reboul	7	6
(Spain) O Roca Batalla (Spain) N Sánchez Izquierdo	5	2
3	(Serbia) I Sabanov (Serbia) M Sabanov	3	6	[10]
(Monaco) R Arneodo (Netherlands) S Verbeek	6	3	[7]
(Italy) M Bortolotti (Spain) S Martos Gornés	6	6
(Norway) V Durasovic (Ukraine) G Kravchenko	3	3
(Ukraine) V Manafov (Ukraine) O Prihodko	7	6
(Ukraine) D Molchanov (Slovakia) I Zelenay	5	1

Semifinals
1	(Venezuela) LD Martínez (France) F Reboul	7^{10}	6^{4}	[8]
3	(Serbia) I Sabanov (Serbia) M Sabanov	6^{8}	7^{7}	[10]
(Italy) M Bortolotti (Spain) S Martos Gornés	6	6^{4}	[10]
(Ukraine) V Manafov (Ukraine) O Prihodko	4	7^{7}	[6]

Final
3	(Serbia) I Sabanov (Serbia) M Sabanov	4	4
(Italy) M Bortolotti (Spain) S Martos Gornés	6	6
