= 2013 San Marino CEPU Open – Singles =

Singles
- 2013 San Marino CEPU Open

Final
- Champion: (Italy) Marco Cecchinato
- Runner-up: (Italy) Filippo Volandri
- Score: 6-3, 6-4

Events
Singles	Doubles
- San Marino CEPU Open

Martin Kližan was the defending champion, but had to compete in the 2013 Rogers Cup instead.

== Seeds ==
1. (Spain) Daniel Gimeno-Traver (semifinals)
2. (Romania) Adrian Ungur (quarterfinals)
3. (France) Guillaume Rufin (quarterfinals)
4. (Czech Republic) Jiří Veselý (quarterfinals)
5. (Germany) Jan-Lennard Struff (semifinals)
6. (Italy) Filippo Volandri (final)
7. (Netherlands) Jesse Huta Galung (second round)
8. (Slovenia) Blaž Kavčič (quarterfinals)

== Draw ==
Key

- Q = Qualifier
- WC = Wild card
- LL = Lucky loser
- Alt = Alternate
- ITF = ITF entry
- PR = Protected ranking
- SR = Special ranking
- SE = Special exempt
- JE = Junior exempt
- JR = Junior Accelerator Programme entrant
- CO = College Accelerator Programme entrant
- NG = Next Gen Accelerator Program entrant
- w/o = Walkover
- r = Retired
- d = Defaulted

=== Finals ===
Semifinals
1	(Spain) Daniel Gimeno-Traver	6^{2}	4
6	(Italy) Filippo Volandri	7^{7}	6
WC	(Italy) Marco Cecchinato	6	6
5	(Germany) Jan-Lennard Struff	3	3

Final
6	(Italy) Filippo Volandri	3	4
WC	(Italy) Marco Cecchinato	6	6

=== Top half ===
First round
1	(Spain) D Gimeno-Traver	6	6
WC	(Italy) A Giannessi	3	0
Q	(Italy) R Marcora	6	6
(France) J Eysseric	1	0
Q	(Italy) A Virgili	3	6	7^{7}
(Ukraine) O Nedovyesov	6	4	6^{2}
Q	(Italy) M Trevisan	1	6	1
8	(Slovenia) B Kavčič	6	1	6
3	(France) G Rufin	4	6	6
(Spain) G Granollers	6	2	1
(Bosnia and Herzegovina) M Bašić	7^{7}	4	6
WC	(Italy) S Travaglia	6^{4}	6	3
Q	(Italy) F Gaio	4	6	7^{7}
(Germany) B Phau	6	4	6^{3}
WC	(Italy) G Quinzi	3	6	3
6	(Italy) F Volandri	6	3	6

Second round
1	(Spain) D Gimeno-Traver	6	6
Q	(Italy) R Marcora	4	2
Q	(Italy) A Virgili	2	6	3
8	(Slovenia) B Kavčič	6	3	6
3	(France) G Rufin	7^{7}	6
(Bosnia and Herzegovina) M Bašić	6^{4}	1
Q	(Italy) F Gaio	1	7^{10}	2
6	(Italy) F Volandri	6	6^{8}	6

Quarterfinals
1	(Spain) D Gimeno-Traver	6^{6}	6	6
8	(Slovenia) B Kavčič	7^{8}	3	4
3	(France) G Rufin	4	6^{11}
6	(Italy) F Volandri	6	7^{13}

Semifinals
1	(Spain) D Gimeno-Traver	6^{2}	4
6	(Italy) F Volandri	7^{7}	6

=== Bottom half ===
First round
7	(Netherlands) J Huta Galung	6	6
(Italy) R Bellotti	4	2
WC	(Italy) M Cecchinato	4	6	6
(Czech Republic) J Mertl	6	2	4
(Serbia) D Lajović	6	6^{4}	7^{8}
(Slovakia) A Martin	2	7^{7}	6^{6}
(Serbia) B Pašanski	4	3
4	(Czech Republic) J Veselý	6	6
5	(Germany) J-L Struff	6	6
(Belgium) N Desein	3	4
(Croatia) A Veić	6	4	3
(Italy) P Starace	4	6	6
(Bosnia and Herzegovina) A Šetkić	1	3
(Italy) A di Mauro	6	6
(Ukraine) I Sergeyev	6	3	1
2	(Romania) A Ungur	1	6	6

Second round
7	(Netherlands) J Huta Galung	3	1
WC	(Italy) M Cecchinato	6	6
(Serbia) D Lajović	5	6	5
4	(Czech Republic) J Veselý	7	4	7
5	(Germany) J-L Struff	3	6	6
(Italy) P Starace	6	2	3
(Italy) A di Mauro	4	3
2	(Romania) A Ungur	6	6

Quarterfinals
WC	(Italy) M Cecchinato	7^{7}	3	6
4	(Czech Republic) J Veselý	6^{5}	6	1
5	(Germany) J-L Struff	6	6
2	(Romania) A Ungur	3	1

Semifinals
WC	(Italy) M Cecchinato	6	6
5	(Germany) J-L Struff	3	3
