= 2012 San Marino CEPU Open =

- Date: 6 – 12 August
- Edition: 25th
- Location: City of San Marino, San Marino

Champions

Singles
- (Slovakia) Martin Kližan

Doubles
- (Czech Republic) Lukáš Dlouhý / (Slovakia) Michal Mertiňák
← 2011 ·	San Marino CEPU Open	· 2013 →

The 2012 San Marino CEPU Open was a professional tennis tournament plays on clay courts. It was the 25th edition of the tournament which is part of the Tretorn SERIE+ of the 2012 ATP Challenger Tour. It takes place in City of San Marino, San Marino between 6 and 12 August 2012.

== Singles main draw entrants ==
=== Seeds ===
Country	Player	Rank^{1}	Seed
SVK	Martin Kližan	52	1
SLO	Blaž Kavčič	76	2
ITA	Filippo Volandri	80	3
ESP	Albert Montañés	90	4
BRA	Rogério Dutra da Silva	95	5
ITA	Simone Bolelli	104	6
ESP	Daniel Gimeno Traver	108	7
ITA	Potito Starace	112	8

- ^{1} Rankings are as of August 1, 2012.

=== Other entrants ===
The following players received wildcards into the singles main draw:

- (Italy) Alessio di Mauro
- (Italy) Stefano Galvani
- (Chile) Nicolás Massú
- (Italy) Walter Trusendi

The following players received entry from the qualifying draw:

- (Italy) Claudio Grassi
- (Chile) Guillermo Hormazábal
- (Netherlands) Miliaan Niesten
- (France) Stéphane Robert

== Champions ==
=== Singles ===
- (Slovakia) Martin Kližan def. (Italy) Simone Bolelli, 6–3, 6–1

=== Doubles ===
- (Czech Republic) Lukáš Dlouhý / (Slovakia) Michal Mertiňák def. (Italy) Stefano Ianni / (Italy) Matteo Viola, 2–6, 7–6^{(7–3)}, [11–9]
