= 2011 San Marino CEPU Open – Singles =

Tennis tournament

Singles
- 2011 San Marino CEPU Open

Final
- Champion: (Italy) Potito Starace
- Runner-up: (Slovakia) Martin Kližan
- Score: 6–1, 3–0, retired

Events
Singles	Doubles
← 2010 ·	San Marino CEPU Open	· 2012 →

Robin Haase was the defending champion, but decided not to participate.

Potito Starace won the title. He played against Martin Kližan, but his opponent retired due to left foot injury, when the result was 6–1, 3–0.

== Seeds ==
1. (Italy) Potito Starace (champion)
2. (Czech Republic) Lukáš Rosol (quarterfinals)
3. (Italy) Filippo Volandri (second round)
4. (Spain) Pere Riba (second round)
5. (Portugal) Rui Machado (second round)
6. (France) Marc Gicquel (semifinals)
7. (Germany) Mischa Zverev (first round)
8. (France) Benoît Paire (semifinals)

== Draw ==
=== Key ===
- Q = Qualifier
- WC = Wild card
- LL = Lucky loser
- Alt = Alternate
- SE = Special exempt
- PR = Protected ranking
- ITF = ITF entry
- JE = Junior exempt
- w/o = Walkover
- r = Retired
- d = Defaulted
- SR = Special ranking

=== Finals ===
Semifinals
1	(Italy) Potito Starace	6	6
8	(France) Benoît Paire	2	4
(Slovakia) Martin Kližan	3	6	7
6	(France) Marc Gicquel	6	4	5

Final
1	(Italy) Potito Starace	6	3
(Slovakia) Martin Kližan	1	0^{r}

=== Top half ===
First round
1	(Italy) P Starace	6	6
(Germany) D Gremelmayr	4	1
WC	(Italy) A di Mauro	4	6	6^{2}
(Netherlands) J Huta Galung	6	4	7^{7}
(Czech Republic) J Hájek	7^{7}	6
(France) D Guez	6^{4}	3
(Belgium) S Darcis	7^{7}	6
7	(Germany) M Zverev	6^{3}	1
4	(Spain) P Riba	3	6	6
WC	(Italy) M Trevisan	6	3	2
Q	(Belgium) M Authom	5	6	3
SE	(Argentina) L Mayer	7	1	6
(Belarus) U Ignatik	6^{3}	3
(Serbia) N Ćirić	7^{7}	6
(Italy) S Bolelli	7^{7}	5	2
8	(France) B Paire	6^{5}	7	6

Second round
1	(Italy) P Starace	7	6
(Netherlands) J Huta Galung	5	3
(Czech Republic) J Hájek	6	7
(Belgium) S Darcis	1	5
4	(Spain) P Riba	1	2
SE	(Argentina) L Mayer	6	6
(Serbia) N Ćirić	7^{7}	4	4
8	(France) B Paire	6^{0}	6	6

Quarterfinals
1	(Italy) P Starace	6	6
(Czech Republic) J Hájek	4	3
SE	(Argentina) L Mayer	4	3
8	(France) B Paire	6	6

Semifinals
1	(Italy) P Starace	6	6
8	(France) B Paire	2	4

=== Bottom half ===
First round
5	(Portugal) R Machado	6	6
(Romania) A Ungur	1	2
Q	(Portugal) J Sousa	2	4
(Slovakia) M Kližan	6	6
(Germany) B Phau	6	7
(Italy) P Lorenzi	3	5
Q	(Italy) D Giorgini	1	2
3	(Italy) F Volandri	6	6
6	(France) M Gicquel	6	1	7
WC	(Italy) S Galvani	1	6	5
Q	(Monaco) B Balleret	4	7	6
WC	(Austria) T Muster	6	5	2
SE	(France) Grégoire Burquier	2	6	3
(Germany) D Brown	6	3	6
(Czech Republic) I Minář	5	3
2	(Czech Republic) L Rosol	7	6

Second round
5	(Portugal) R Machado	6	4	6^{1}
(Slovakia) M Kližan	3	6	7^{7}
(Germany) B Phau	6	6
3	(Italy) F Volandri	2	2
6	(France) M Gicquel	6	7
Q	(Monaco) B Balleret	2	5
(Germany) D Brown	1	6	3
2	(Czech Republic) L Rosol	6	3	6

Quarterfinals
(Slovakia) M Kližan	6	0
(Germany) B Phau	3	0^{r}
6	(France) M Gicquel	3	6	6
2	(Czech Republic) L Rosol	6	3	4

Semifinals
(Slovakia) M Kližan	3	6	7
6	(France) M Gicquel	6	4	5
