= 2024 San Marino Open – Doubles =

Doubles
- 2024 San Marino Open

Final
- Champions: (Czech Republic) Petr Nouza (Czech Republic) Patrik Rikl
- Runners-up: (France) Théo Arribagé (Brazil) Orlando Luz
- Score: 1–6, 7–5, [10–6]

Events
Singles	Doubles
- San Marino Open

Ivan Liutarevich and Vladyslav Manafov were the defending champions but only Liutarevich chose to defend his title, partnering Szymon Walków. They lost in the first round to Alexandru Jecan and Giorgio Ricca.

Petr Nouza and Patrik Rikl won the title after defeating Théo Arribagé and Orlando Luz 1–6, 7–5, [10–6] in the final.

== Seeds ==
1. (Ecuador) Gonzalo Escobar / (Tunisia) Skander Mansouri (quarterfinals)
2. (France) Théo Arribagé / (Brazil) Orlando Luz (final)
3. (Bolivia) Boris Arias / (Bolivia) Federico Zeballos (first round)
4. (Italy) Marco Bortolotti / (Australia) Matthew Romios (semifinals)

== Draw ==
Key

- Q = Qualifier
- WC = Wild card
- LL = Lucky loser
- Alt = Alternate
- ITF = ITF entry
- PR = Protected ranking
- SR = Special ranking
- SE = Special exempt
- JE = Junior exempt
- JR = Junior Accelerator Programme entrant
- CO = College Accelerator Programme entrant
- NG = Next Gen Accelerator Program entrant
- w/o = Walkover
- r = Retired
- d = Defaulted

=== Draw ===
First round
1	(Ecuador) G Escobar (Tunisia) S Mansouri	6	6
(Venezuela) LD Martínez (Colombia) C Rodríguez	4	2
I Liutarevich (Poland) S Walków	6^{5}	5
(Romania) A Jecan (Italy) G Ricca	7^{7}	7
3	(Bolivia) B Arias (Bolivia) F Zeballos	4	4
(Czech Republic) P Nouza (Czech Republic) P Rikl	6	6
(France) M Janvier (Argentina) G Villanueva	4
WC	(Italy) M Cecchinato (Italy) A Giannessi	3^{r}
(Spain) S Martos Gornés (Spain) D Vega Hernández	6	6^{5}	[8]
(Brazil) D Dutra da Silva (Dominican Republic) N Hardt	2	7^{7}	[10]
Alt	(Brazil) M Alves (Brazil) P Sakamoto	4	4
4	(Italy) M Bortolotti (Australia) MC Romios	6	6
(Australia) T Fancutt (Denmark) J Ingildsen	6	6
WC	(Italy) Emanuele De Sanctis (Italy) F Fognini	2	2
(Argentina) JM Cerúndolo (Argentina) A Collarini	3	4
2	(France) T Arribagé (Brazil) O Luz	6	6

Quarterfinals
1	(Ecuador) G Escobar (Tunisia) S Mansouri	6	4	[2]
(Romania) A Jecan (Italy) G Ricca	0	6	[10]
(Czech Republic) P Nouza (Czech Republic) P Rikl	6	6
(France) M Janvier (Argentina) G Villanueva	1	3
(Brazil) D Dutra da Silva (Dominican Republic) N Hardt
4	(Italy) M Bortolotti (Australia) MC Romios	w/o
(Australia) T Fancutt (Denmark) J Ingildsen	6	2	[5]
2	(France) T Arribagé (Brazil) O Luz	4	6	[10]

Semifinals
(Romania) A Jecan (Italy) G Ricca	6^{6}	3
(Czech Republic) P Nouza (Czech Republic) P Rikl	7^{8}	6
4	(Italy) M Bortolotti (Australia) MC Romios	3	4
2	(France) T Arribagé (Brazil) O Luz	6	6

Final
(Czech Republic) P Nouza (Czech Republic) P Rikl	1	7	[10]
2	(France) T Arribagé (Brazil) O Luz	6	5	[6]
