= 2009 San Marino CEPU Open =

- Date: August 3 – August 9
- Edition: 21st
- Location: City of San Marino, San Marino

Champions

Singles
- (Italy) Andreas Seppi

Doubles
- (Argentina) Lucas Arnold Ker / (Argentina) Sebastián Prieto
← 2008 ·	San Marino CEPU Open	· 2010 →

The 2009 San Marino CEPU Open was a professional tennis tournament played on outdoor red clay courts. It was the twenty-first edition of the tournament which was part of the Tretorn SERIE+ of the 2009 ATP Challenger Tour. It took place in City of San Marino, San Marino between 3 and 9 August 2009.

== Singles entrants ==
=== Seeds ===
Nationality	Player	Ranking*	Seeding
ITA	Andreas Seppi	43	1
ESP	Óscar Hernández	72	2
GER	Björn Phau	78	3
ROU	Victor Crivoi	81	4
AUT	Daniel Köllerer	82	5
ESP	Daniel Gimeno-Traver	86	6
BEL	Olivier Rochus	87	7
ESP	Alberto Martín	100	8

- Rankings are as of July 27, 2009.

=== Other entrants ===
The following players received wildcards into the singles main draw:

- (Italy) Daniele Bracciali
- (Italy) Stefano Galvani
- (Argentina) Gastón Gaudio
- (Italy) Andreas Seppi

The following players received a Special Exempt into the main draw:

- (Netherlands) Thiemo de Bakker
- (Ukraine) Oleksandr Dolgopolov Jr.

The following players received entry from the qualifying draw:

- (Argentina) Martín Alund
- (Czech Republic) Dušan Lojda
- (Italy) Gianluca Naso
- (Czech Republic) Lukáš Rosol

== Champions ==
=== Singles ===
(Italy) Andreas Seppi def. (Italy) Potito Starace, 7–6(4), 2–6, 6–4

=== Doubles ===
(Argentina) Lucas Arnold Ker / (Argentina) Sebastián Prieto def. (Sweden) Johan Brunström / (Netherlands Antilles) Jean-Julien Rojer, 7–6(4), 2–6, [10–7]
