= 2011 San Marino CEPU Open =

- Date: 8–14 August
- Edition: 24th
- Location: City of San Marino, San Marino

Champions

Singles
- (Italy) Potito Starace

Doubles
- (United States) James Cerretani / (Germany) Philipp Marx
← 2010 ·	San Marino CEPU Open	· 2012 →

The 2011 San Marino CEPU Open was a professional tennis tournament played on clay courts. It was the 24th edition of the tournament which was part of the Tretorn SERIE+ of the 2011 ATP Challenger Tour. It took place in City of San Marino, San Marino between 8 and 14 August 2011.

== Singles main draw entrants ==
=== Seeds ===
Country	Player	Rank^{1}	Seed
ITA	Potito Starace	63	1
CZE	Lukáš Rosol	69	2
ITA	Filippo Volandri	73	3
ESP	Pere Riba	77	4
POR	Rui Machado	84	5
FRA	Marc Gicquel	101	6
GER	Mischa Zverev	115	7
FRA	Benoît Paire	117	8

- ^{1} Rankings are as of August 1, 2011.

=== Other entrants ===
The following players received wildcards into the singles main draw:

- (Italy) Alessio di Mauro
- (Italy) Stefano Galvani
- (Austria) Thomas Muster
- (Italy) Matteo Trevisan

The following players received entry as a special exempt into the singles main draw:

- (France) Grégoire Burquier
- (Argentina) Leonardo Mayer

The following players received entry from the qualifying draw:

- (Belgium) Maxime Authom
- (Monaco) Benjamin Balleret
- (Italy) Daniele Giorgini
- (Portugal) João Sousa

== Champions ==
=== Singles ===
(Italy) Potito Starace def. (Slovakia) Martin Kližan, 6–1, 3–0, retired

=== Doubles ===
(United States) James Cerretani / (Germany) Philipp Marx def. (Italy) Daniele Bracciali / (Austria) Julian Knowle, 6–3, 6–4
