= 2025 San Marino Open =

- Date: 14 – 20 July
- Edition: 32nd
- Location: City of San Marino, San Marino

Champions

Singles
- (Slovakia) Lukáš Klein

Doubles
- (Poland) Karol Drzewiecki / (Chinese Taipei) Ray Ho
- San Marino Open

The 2025 Internazionali di Tennis San Marino Open was a professional tennis tournament played on clay courts. The 32nd edition of the tournament, which was part of the 2025 ATP Challenger Tour, took place in City of San Marino, San Marino between 14 and 20 July 2025.

== Singles main-draw entrants ==
=== Seeds ===
| Country | Player | Rank^{1} | Seed |
|---|---|---|---|
| FRA | Valentin Royer | 113 | 1 |
| ARG | Thiago Agustín Tirante | 121 | 2 |
| ITA | Matteo Gigante | 133 | 3 |
| FRA | Kyrian Jacquet | 148 | 4 |
| CRO | Dino Prižmić | 159 | 5 |
| ARG | Federico Agustín Gómez | 161 | 6 |
| AUT | Lukas Neumayer | 169 | 7 |
| FRA | Ugo Blanchet | 173 | 8 |

- ^{1} Rankings are as of 30 June 2025.

=== Other entrants ===
The following players received wildcards into the singles main draw:

- (Italy) Pierluigi Basile
- (Italy) Carlo Alberto Caniato
- (Italy) Federico Cinà

The following player received entry into the singles main draw through the Next Gen Accelerator programme:

- (France) Arthur Géa

The following players received entry into the singles main draw as alternates:

- (Bosnia and Herzegovina) Nerman Fatić
- (Croatia) Mili Poljičak

The following players received entry from the qualifying draw:

- (Lithuania) Ričardas Berankis
- (North Macedonia) Kalin Ivanovski
- (Slovakia) Miloš Karol
- (Argentina) Mariano Kestelboim
- (Ukraine) Oleg Prihodko
- (Argentina) Gonzalo Villanueva

== Champions ==
=== Singles ===
- (Slovakia) Lukáš Klein def. (Croatia) Dino Prižmić 6–3, 6–4.

=== Doubles ===
- (Poland) Karol Drzewiecki / (Chinese Taipei) Ray Ho def. (Slovakia) Miloš Karol / (Ukraine) Vitaliy Sachko 7–5, 7–6^{(7–3)}.
