= 2023 San Marino Open =

- Date: 31 July – 6 August
- Edition: 30th
- Location: City of San Marino, San Marino

Champions

Singles
- (Spain) Jaume Munar

Doubles
- Ivan Liutarevich / (Ukraine) Vladyslav Manafov
- San Marino Open

The 2023 Internazionali di Tennis San Marino Open was a professional tennis tournament played on clay courts. The 30th edition of the tournament, which was part of the 2023 ATP Challenger Tour, took place in City of San Marino, San Marino between 31 July and 6 August 2023.

== Singles main-draw entrants ==
=== Seeds ===
Country	Player	Rank^{1}	Seed
FRA	Alexandre Müller	81	1
ESP	Jaume Munar	104	2
BEL	David Goffin	111	3
ITA	Fabio Fognini	137	4
ITA	Flavio Cobolli	148	5
BEL	Kimmer Coppejans	163	6
CZE	Zdeněk Kolář	168	7
AUS	Marc Polmans	170	8

- ^{1} Rankings are as of 24 July 2023.

=== Other entrants ===
The following players received wildcards into the singles main draw:

- (Italy) Flavio Cobolli
- (San Marino) Marco De Rossi
- (Italy) Fabio Fognini

The following players received entry from the qualifying draw:

- (Italy) Enrico Dalla Valle
- (France) Kyrian Jacquet
- (Italy) Marcello Serafini
- (Spain) Carlos Taberner
- (Monaco) Valentin Vacherot
- (Italy) Alexander Weis

== Champions ==
=== Singles ===
- (Spain) Jaume Munar def. (Italy) Andrea Pellegrino 6–4, 6–1.

=== Doubles ===
- Ivan Liutarevich / (Ukraine) Vladyslav Manafov def. (France) Théo Arribagé / (France) Luca Sanchez 6–4, 7–6^{(10–8)}.
