= 2026 San Marino Open =

- Date: 27 July – 2 August
- Edition: 33rd
- Location: City of San Marino, San Marino

Champions

Singles
- (Argentina) Facundo Díaz Acosta

Doubles
- (Serbia) Stefan Latinović / (Croatia) Mili Poljičak
- San Marino Open

The 2026 Internazionali di Tennis San Marino Open was a professional tennis tournament played on clay courts. The 33rd edition of the tournament, which was part of the 2026 ATP Challenger Tour, took place in City of San Marino, San Marino between 27 July and 2 August 2026.

== Singles main-draw entrants ==
=== Seeds ===
Country	Player	Rank^{1}	Seed
ARG	Facundo Díaz Acosta	108	1
FIN	Otto Virtanen	125	2
LTU	Vilius Gaubas	128	3
GEO	Nikoloz Basilashvili	130	4
FRA	Alexandre Müller	133	5
ITA	Andrea Pellegrino	138	6
BOL	Hugo Dellien	144	7
ITA	Francesco Maestrelli	149	8

- ^{1} Rankings are as of 20 July 2026.

=== Other entrants ===
The following players received wildcards into the singles main draw:

- (Italy) Carlo Alberto Caniato
- (Italy) Filippo Romano
- (Italy) Jacopo Vasamì

The following player received entry into the singles main draw using a protected ranking:

- (Argentina) Federico Coria

The following player received entry into the singles main draw through the Next Gen Accelerator programme:

- (France) Thomas Faurel

The following players received entry into the singles main draw as alternates:

- (Italy) Franco Agamenone
- (Spain) Daniel Rincón

The following players received entry from the qualifying draw:

- (Italy) Tommaso Compagnucci
- (Italy) Enrico Dalla Valle
- (Brazil) Thiago Monteiro
- (Croatia) Mili Poljičak
- (Peru) Juan Pablo Varillas
- (Czech Republic) Michael Vrbenský

The following player received entry as a lucky loser:

- (Italy) Francesco Forti

== Champions ==
=== Singles ===
- (Argentina) Facundo Díaz Acosta def. (Croatia) Mili Poljičak 6–1, 6–4.

=== Doubles ===
- (Serbia) Stefan Latinović / (Croatia) Mili Poljičak def. (France) Arthur Reymond / (France) Luca Sanchez 7–6^{(7–5)}, 6–3.
