= 2023 San Marino Open – Singles =

Singles
- 2023 San Marino Open

Final
- Champion: (Spain) Jaume Munar
- Runner-up: (Italy) Andrea Pellegrino
- Score: 6–4, 6–1

Events
Singles	Doubles
- San Marino Open

Pavel Kotov was the defending champion but chose not to defend his title.

Jaume Munar won the title after defeating Andrea Pellegrino 6–4, 6–1 in the final.

== Seeds ==
1. (France) Alexandre Müller (first round)
2. (Spain) Jaume Munar (champion)
3. (Belgium) David Goffin (quarterfinals)
4. (Italy) Fabio Fognini (quarterfinals)
5. (Italy) Flavio Cobolli (first round)
6. (Belgium) Kimmer Coppejans (second round)
7. (Czech Republic) Zdeněk Kolář (first round)
8. (Australia) Marc Polmans (first round)

== Draw ==
Key

- Q = Qualifier
- WC = Wild card
- LL = Lucky loser
- Alt = Alternate
- ITF = ITF entry
- PR = Protected ranking
- SR = Special ranking
- SE = Special exempt
- JE = Junior exempt
- JR = Junior Accelerator Programme entrant
- CO = College Accelerator Programme entrant
- NG = Next Gen Accelerator Program entrant
- w/o = Walkover
- r = Retired
- d = Defaulted

=== Finals ===
Semifinals
(Italy) Andrea Pellegrino	3	6	0
(Bosnia and Herzegovina) Nerman Fatić	6	3	0^{r}
(Spain) Daniel Rincón	6	1	2
2	(Spain) Jaume Munar	0	6	6

Final
(Italy) Andrea Pellegrino	4	1
2	(Spain) Jaume Munar	6	6

=== Top half ===
First round
1	(France) A Müller	3	4
Q	(Italy) E Dalla Valle	6	6
(Tunisia) A Dougaz	3	1^{r}
(Italy) A Pellegrino	6	4
Q	(Italy) Alexander Weis	7	1
(Italy) G Mager	5	1^{r}
Q	(Monaco) V Vacherot	6	6
7	(Czech Republic) Z Kolář	2	3
3	(Belgium) D Goffin	6	7
(Italy) F Gaio	2	5
(Ukraine) V Sachko	6	2	6
(Romania) ND Ionel	4	6	3
(Argentina) RA Burruchaga	3	6	3
(Bosnia and Herzegovina) N Fatić	6	3	6
Q	(France) K Jacquet	6	4	6
5/WC	(Italy) F Cobolli	3	6	1

Second round
Q	(Italy) E Dalla Valle	4	6	1
(Italy) A Pellegrino	6	1	6
Q	(Italy) A Weis	6	3	7^{7}
Q	(Monaco) V Vacherot	4	6	6^{3}
3	(Belgium) D Goffin	6^{0}	6	6
(Ukraine) V Sachko	7^{7}	2	2
(Bosnia and Herzegovina) N Fatić	7	6
Q	(France) K Jacquet	5	4

Quarterfinals
(Italy) A Pellegrino	7^{7}	7^{7}
Q	(Italy) A Weis	6^{3}	6^{3}
3	(Belgium) D Goffin	2	3
(Bosnia and Herzegovina) N Fatić	6	6

Semifinals
(Italy) A Pellegrino	3	6	0
(Bosnia and Herzegovina) N Fatić	6	3	0^{r}

=== Bottom half ===
First round
6	(Belgium) K Coppejans	6	6
(Sweden) DN Mădăraș	4	4
(Spain) D Rincón	7^{7}	7^{7}
Q	(Italy) Marcello Serafini	6^{5}	6^{4}
WC	(San Marino) M De Rossi	3	4
(Italy) Edoardo Lavagno	6	6
(Argentina) A Collarini	0	1
4/WC	(Italy) F Fognini	6	6
8	(Australia) M Polmans	1	3
(Argentina) F Delbonis	6	6
(Italy) A Giannessi	1	6	6
(Tunisia) M Echargui	6	4	4
Q	(Spain) C Taberner	6	2	5
(Spain) N Sánchez Izquierdo	2	6	7
(Italy) F Passaro	4	4
2	(Spain) J Munar	6	6

Second round
6	(Belgium) K Coppejans	3	2
(Spain) D Rincón	6	6
(Italy) E Lavagno	3	5
4/WC	(Italy) F Fognini	6	7
(Argentina) F Delbonis	6	5	6
(Italy) A Giannessi	3	7	1
(Spain) N Sánchez Izquierdo	1	2
2	(Spain) J Munar	6	6

Quarterfinals
(Spain) D Rincón	6^{4}	6	6
4/WC	(Italy) F Fognini	7^{7}	4	4
(Argentina) F Delbonis	4	5
2	(Spain) J Munar	6	7

Semifinals
(Spain) D Rincón	6	1	2
2	(Spain) J Munar	0	6	6
