= San Marino Open (tennis) =

Men's tennis tournament

Internazionali di Tennis San Marino Open
- 2026 San Marino Open

ATP Challenger Tour
- Event name: Internazionali di Tennis San Marino Open
- Founded: 1988
- Location: City of San Marino, San Marino
- Venue: Centro Sportivo Serravalle (1988–1990); Centro Tennis Cassa di Risparmio di Fonte dell'Ovo (1991–)
- Category: ATP Challenger Tour 125
- Surface: Clay
- Draw: 32S/16Q/16D
- Prize money: €148,625
- Website: website

The Internazionali di Tennis San Marino Open (formerly known as the San Marino CEPU Open and San Marino GO&FUN Open) is a professional tennis tournament played on clay. It is currently part of the ATP Challenger 125 and has been held annually at the Centro Tennis Cassa di Risparmio di Fonte dell'Ovo in the City of San Marino.

It was a Challenger in 1988, a Grand Prix Regular Series tournament in 1989, an ATP World Series tournament from 1990 to 1999, an ATP International Series tournament in 2000, and a Challenger again from 2001 until 2014 and after it returned in 2021. For the first three years it was held at Centro Sportivo Serravalle before moving to its current home in 1991.

== Past finals ==
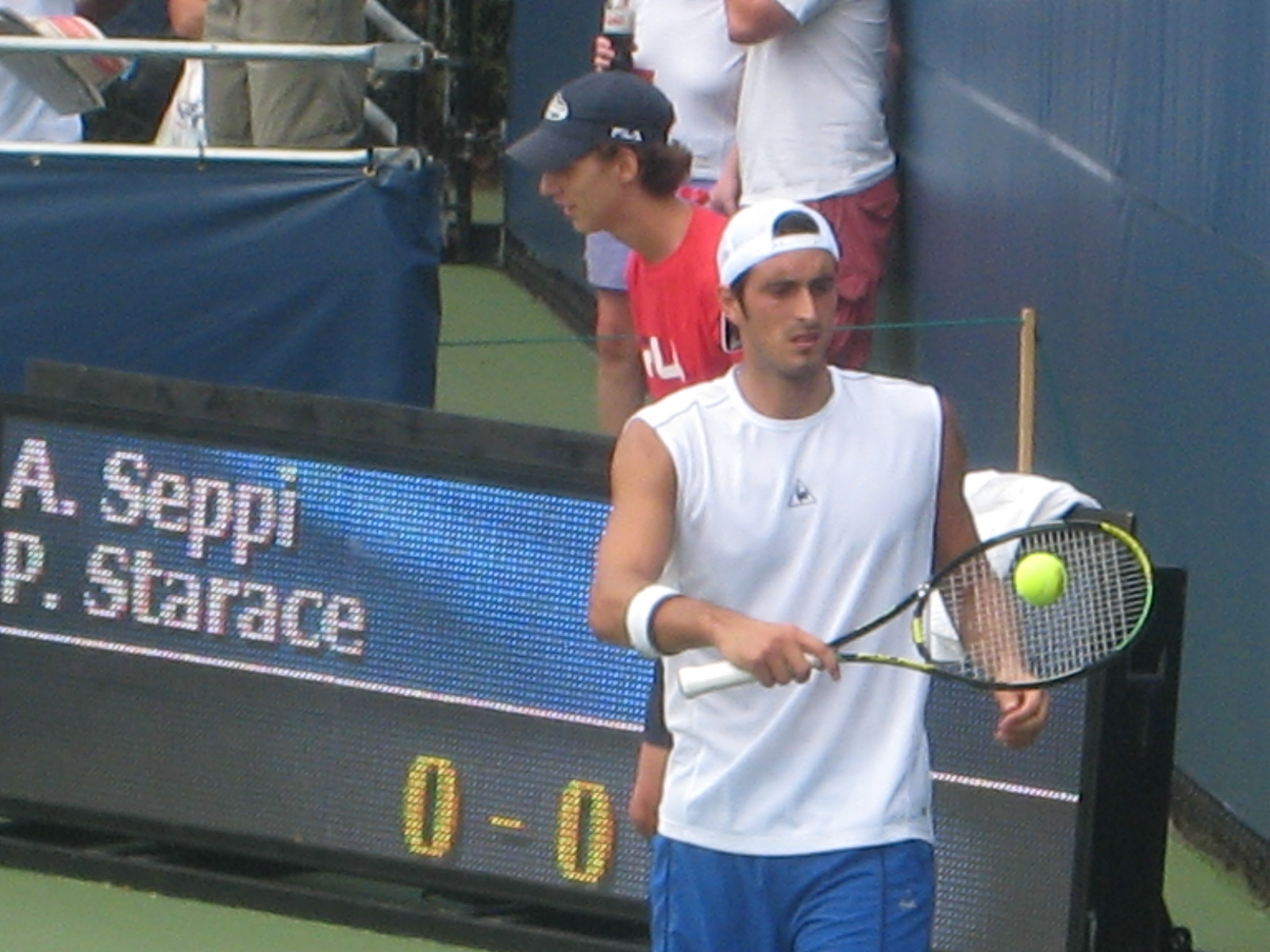
Italian Potito Starace reached five singles finals in San Marino, winning in 2004, 2007 and 2011, losing in 2008 and 2009

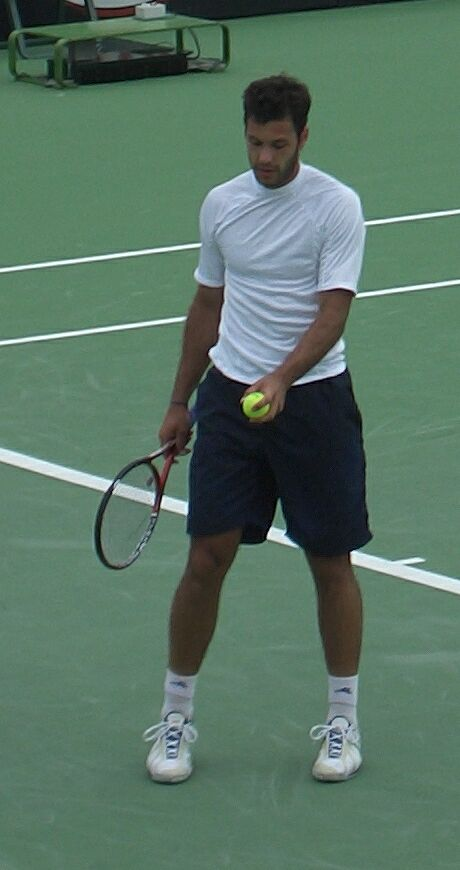
Argentina's José Acasuso won the San Marino Challenger singles in 2002

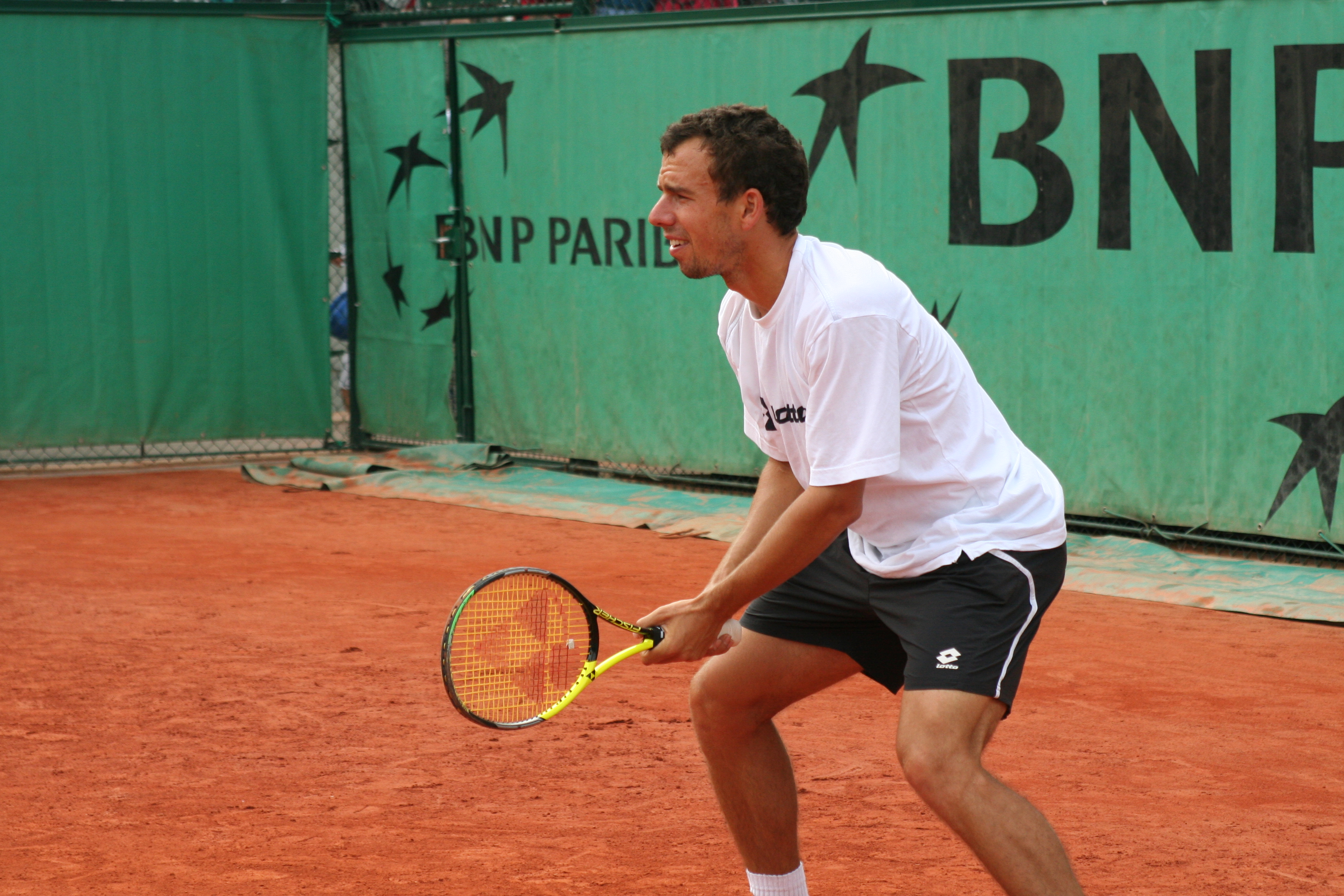
Singles and doubles player Dominik Hrbatý from Slovakia defeated Mariano Puerta in the 1998 singles final

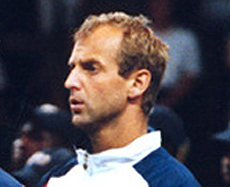
Eventual world No. 1 Thomas Muster won the singles in 1993 and 1995, with the event part of the ATP World Series

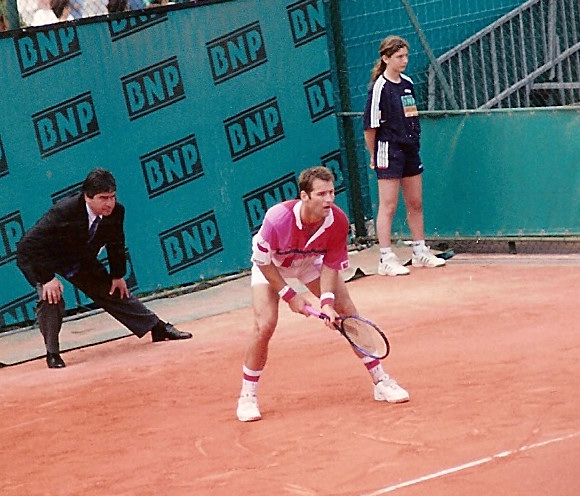
Top tenner Karel Nováček, then competing for Czechoslovakia, titled in the San Marino singles in 1992

=== Key ===
Grand Prix / ATP World Series
Challenger

=== Singles ===
Year	Champions	Runners-up	Score
2026	(Argentina) Facundo Díaz Acosta	(Croatia) Mili Poljičak	6–1, 6–4
2025	(Slovakia) Lukáš Klein	(Croatia) Dino Prižmić	6–3, 6–4
2024	(France) Alexandre Müller	(Chinese Taipei) Tseng Chun-hsin	6–3, 4–6, 7–6^{(7–3)}
2023	(Spain) Jaume Munar	(Italy) Andrea Pellegrino	6–4, 6–1
2022	Pavel Kotov	(Italy) Matteo Arnaldi	7–6^{(7–5)}, 6–4
2021	(Denmark) Holger Rune	(Brazil) Orlando Luz	1–6, 6–2, 6–3
2015–2020	No competition		
2014	(Romania) Adrian Ungur	(Croatia) Antonio Veić	6–1, 6–0
2013	(Italy) Marco Cecchinato	(Italy) Filippo Volandri	6–3, 6–4
2012	(Slovakia) Martin Kližan	(Italy) Simone Bolelli	6–3, 6–1
2011	(Italy) Potito Starace	(Slovakia) Martin Kližan	6–1, 3–0, ret.
2010	(Netherlands) Robin Haase	(Italy) Filippo Volandri	6–2, 7–6^{(10–8)}
2009	(Italy) Andreas Seppi	(Italy) Potito Starace	7–6^{(7–4)}, 2–6, 6–4
2008	(Italy) Filippo Volandri	(Italy) Potito Starace	5–7, 6–4, 6–1
2007	(Italy) Potito Starace	(Spain) Albert Montañés	6–4, 7–6^{(7–5)}
2006	(Spain) Albert Montañés	(Argentina) Sergio Roitman	7–6^{(7–5)}, 6–7^{(5–7)}, 6–3
2005	(Costa Rica) Juan Antonio Marín	(Croatia) Saša Tuksar	6–2, 6–4
2004	(Italy) Potito Starace	(United States) Hugo Armando	6–4, 1–6, 6–3
2003	(Italy) Alessio di Mauro	(Spain) David Sánchez	6–3, 3–2 retired
2002	(Argentina) José Acasuso	(Spain) Albert Portas	3–6, 6–3, 6–2
2001	(Costa Rica) Juan Antonio Marín	(Austria) Markus Hipfl	6–2, 2–6, 7–6^{(7–3)}
2000	(Spain) Álex Calatrava	(Spain) Sergi Bruguera	7–6^{(9–7)}, 1–6, 6–4
1999	(Spain) Galo Blanco	(Spain) Albert Portas	4–6, 6–4, 6–3
1998	(Slovakia) Dominik Hrbatý	(Argentina) Mariano Puerta	6–2, 7–5
1997	(Spain) Félix Mantilla	(Sweden) Magnus Gustafsson	6–4, 6–1
1996	(Spain) Albert Costa	(Spain) Félix Mantilla	7–6^{(9–7)}, 6–3
1995	(Austria) Thomas Muster	(Italy) Andrea Gaudenzi	6–2, 6–0
1994	(Spain) Carlos Costa	(Germany) Oliver Gross	6–1, 6–3
1993	(Austria) Thomas Muster	(Italy) Renzo Furlan	7–5, 7–5
1992	(Czechoslovakia) Karel Nováček	(Spain) Francisco Clavet	7–5, 6–2
1991	(Argentina) Guillermo Pérez Roldán	(France) Frédéric Fontang	6–3, 6–1
1990	(Argentina) Guillermo Pérez Roldán	(Italy) Omar Camporese	6–3, 6–3
1989	(Spain) José Francisco Altur	(Argentina) Roberto Azar	6–7, 6–4, 6–1
1988	(Italy) Paolo Canè	(Italy) Francesco Cancellotti	6–7, 6–3, 6–3

=== Doubles ===
Year	Champions	Runners-up	Score
2026	(Serbia) Stefan Latinović (Croatia) Mili Poljičak	(France) Arthur Reymond (France) Luca Sanchez	7–6^{(7–5)}, 6–3
2025	(Poland) Karol Drzewiecki (Chinese Taipei) Ray Ho	(Slovakia) Miloš Karol (Ukraine) Vitaliy Sachko	7–5, 7–6^{(7–3)}
2024	(Czech Republic) Petr Nouza (Czech Republic) Patrik Rikl	(France) Théo Arribagé (Brazil) Orlando Luz	1–6, 7–5, [10–6]
2023	Ivan Liutarevich (Ukraine) Vladyslav Manafov	(France) Théo Arribagé (France) Luca Sanchez	6–4, 7–6^{(10–8)}
2022	(Italy) Marco Bortolotti (Spain) Sergio Martos Gornés	(Serbia) Ivan Sabanov (Serbia) Matej Sabanov	6–4, 6–4
2021	(Czech Republic) Zdeněk Kolář (Venezuela) Luis David Martínez	(Brazil) Rafael Matos (Brazil) João Menezes	1–6, 6–3, [10–3]
2015 to 2020	No competition		
2014	(Moldova) Radu Albot (Spain) Enrique López Pérez	(Croatia) Franko Škugor (Romania) Adrian Ungur	6–4, 6–1
2013	(United States) Nicholas Monroe (Germany) Simon Stadler	(Italy) Daniele Bracciali (Romania) Florin Mergea	6–2, 6–4
2012	(Czech Republic) Lukáš Dlouhý (Slovakia) Michal Mertiňák	(Italy) Stefano Ianni (Italy) Matteo Viola	2–6, 7–6^{(7–3)}, [11–9]
2011	(United States) James Cerretani (Germany) Philipp Marx	(Italy) Daniele Bracciali (Austria) Julian Knowle	6–3, 6–4
2010	(Italy) Daniele Bracciali (Croatia) Lovro Zovko	(Switzerland) Yves Allegro (United States) James Cerretani	3–6, 6–2, [10–5]
2009	(Argentina) Lucas Arnold Ker (Argentina) Sebastián Prieto	(Sweden) Johan Brunström (Netherlands Antilles) Jean-Julien Rojer	7–6(4), 2–6, [10–7]
2008	(Switzerland) Yves Allegro (Romania) Horia Tecău	(Italy) Fabio Colangelo (Germany) Philipp Marx	7–5, 7–5
2007	(Uruguay) Pablo Cuevas (Argentina) Juan Pablo Guzmán	(Poland) Tomasz Bednarek (United States) James Cerretani	6–1, 6–0
2006	(Argentina) Máximo González (Argentina) Sergio Roitman	(France) Jérôme Haehnel (France) Julien Jeanpierre	6–3, 6–4
2005	(Czech Republic) Lukáš Dlouhý (Czech Republic) David Škoch	(South Africa) Jeff Coetzee (South Africa) Chris Haggard	3–6, 6–4, 6–3
2004	(Italy) Massimo Bertolini (Belgium) Tom Vanhoudt	(Chile) Adrián García (Spain) Álex López Morón	6–2, 6–4
2003	(Italy) Massimo Bertolini (Belgium) Tom Vanhoudt	(Argentina) Federico Browne (Slovakia) Dominik Hrbatý	7–5, 6–7(3), 6–2
2002	(Czech Republic) Leoš Friedl (Czech Republic) David Škoch	(Italy) Massimo Bertolini (Italy) Cristian Brandi	6–2, 6–4
2001	(Czech Republic) František Čermák (Czech Republic) David Škoch	(United States) Devin Bowen (North Macedonia) Aleksandar Kitinov	7–5, 6–4
2000	(Czech Republic) Tomáš Cibulec (Czech Republic) Leoš Friedl	(Argentina) Gastón Etlis (United States) Jack Waite	7–6(1), 7–5
1999	(Argentina) Lucas Arnold Ker (Argentina) Mariano Hood	(Czech Republic) Petr Pála (Czech Republic) Pavel Vízner	6–3, 6–2
1998	(Czech Republic) Jiří Novák (Czech Republic) David Rikl	(Argentina) Mariano Hood (Argentina) Sebastián Prieto	6–4, 7–6
1997	(Italy) Cristian Brandi (Italy) Filippo Messori	(United States) Brandon Coupe (Mexico) David Roditi	7–5, 6–4
1996	(Argentina) Pablo Albano (Argentina) Lucas Arnold Ker	(Argentina) Mariano Hood (Argentina) Sebastián Prieto	6–1, 6–3
1995	(Spain) Jordi Arrese (Australia) Andrew Kratzmann	(Argentina) Pablo Albano (Italy) Federico Mordegan	7–6, 3–6, 6–2
1994	(United Kingdom) Neil Broad (United States) Greg Van Emburgh	(Spain) Jordi Arrese (Italy) Renzo Furlan	6–4, 7–6
1993	(Argentina) Daniel Orsanic (Finland) Olli Rahnasto	(Argentina) Juan Garat (Argentina) Roberto Saad	6–4, 1–6, 6–3
1992	(Sweden) Nicklas Kulti (Sweden) Mikael Tillström	(Italy) Cristian Brandi (Italy) Federico Mordegan	6–2, 6–2
1991	(Spain) Jordi Arrese (Spain) Carlos Costa	(Argentina) Christian Miniussi (Uruguay) Diego Pérez	6–3, 3–6, 6–3
1990	(Czechoslovakia) Vojtěch Flégl (Czechoslovakia) Daniel Vacek	(Spain) Jordi Burillo (Spain) Marcos Aurelio Górriz	6–1, 4–6, 7–6
1989	(Italy) Simone Colombo (Switzerland) Claudio Mezzadri	(Argentina) Pablo Albano (Argentina) Gustavo Luza	6–4, 6–1
1988	(Sweden) Christer Allgårdh (Czechoslovakia) Josef Čihák	(Portugal) João Cunha Silva (Sweden) Jörgen Windahl	6–4, 6–2

== See also ==
- WTA San Marino – women's tournament (1991–1993)
