= 2021 Split Open – Singles =

Singles
- 2021 Split Open

Final
- Champion: (Slovenia) Blaž Rola
- Runner-up: (Slovenia) Blaž Kavčič
- Score: 2–6, 6–3, 6–2

Events
Singles	Doubles
← 2020 ·	Split Open	· 2021 →

Francisco Cerúndolo was the defending champion but chose not to defend his title.

Blaž Rola won the title after defeating Blaž Kavčič 2–6, 6–3, 6–2 in the final.

Held in Split, Croatia (hence the name of the tournament) the tournament took place from April 5th to April 11th.

== Seeds ==
1. (Portugal) Pedro Sousa (first round, retired)
2. (Australia) Marc Polmans (first round)
3. (Austria) Sebastian Ofner (first round)
4. (Egypt) Mohamed Safwat (first round)
5. (Serbia) Danilo Petrović (quarterfinals)
6. (Slovenia) Blaž Rola (champion)
7. (Belgium) Kimmer Coppejans (second round)
8. (Slovakia) Filip Horanský (first round)

== Draw ==
Key

- Q = Qualifier
- WC = Wild card
- LL = Lucky loser
- Alt = Alternate
- ITF = ITF entry
- PR = Protected ranking
- SR = Special ranking
- SE = Special exempt
- JE = Junior exempt
- JR = Junior Accelerator Programme entrant
- CO = College Accelerator Programme entrant
- NG = Next Gen Accelerator Program entrant
- w/o = Walkover
- r = Retired
- d = Defaulted

=== Finals ===
Semifinals
Alt	(Poland) Kacper Żuk	6	3	2
Q	(Slovenia) Blaž Kavčič	2	6	6
(Argentina) Andrea Collarini	6^{3}	7^{7}	4
6	(Slovenia) Blaž Rola	7^{7}	6^{3}	6

Final
Q	(Slovenia) Blaž Kavčič	6	3	2
6	(Slovenia) Blaž Rola	2	6	6

=== Top half ===
First round
1	(Portugal) P Sousa	2^{r}
Alt	(Poland) K Żuk	1
(United Kingdom) J Clarke	6^{1}	0
WC	(Croatia) N Serdarušić	7^{7}	6
Q	(Australia) A Santillan	2	0^{r}
SE	(Czech Republic) Z Kolář	6	5
PR	(Australia) T Kokkinakis	3	6	6
8	(Slovakia) F Horanský	6	4	4
4	(Egypt) M Safwat	3	3
Q	(Slovenia) B Kavčič	6	6
(Sweden) E Ymer	6	6
(France) A Müller	0	4
(Australia) A Vukic	6	6
WC	(Croatia) M Poljičak	1	1
(Australia) B Tomic	2	6	3
7	(Belgium) K Coppejans	6	4	6

Second round
Alt	(Poland) K Żuk	6	6
WC	(Croatia) N Serdarušić	4	2
SE	(Czech Republic) Z Kolář	6^{3}	1
PR	(Australia) T Kokkinakis	7^{7}	6
Q	(Slovenia) B Kavčič	4	7^{9}	6
(Sweden) E Ymer	6	6^{7}	4
(Australia) A Vukic	2	6	6
7	(Belgium) K Coppejans	6	4	4

Quarterfinals
Alt	(Poland) K Żuk	7^{8}	6
PR	(Australia) T Kokkinakis	6^{6}	3
Q	(Slovenia) B Kavčič	4	6	6
(Australia) A Vukic	6	2	2

Semifinals
Alt	(Poland) K Żuk	6	3	2
Q	(Slovenia) B Kavčič	2	6	6

=== Bottom half ===
First round
5	(Serbia) D Petrović	6	6
(Czech Republic) L Rosol	1	3
(Portugal) J Domingues	5	3
(Germany) M Marterer	7	6
(Australia) A Bolt	4	2
Q	(Belarus) U Ignatik	6	6
(Argentina) A Collarini	6	6
3	(Austria) S Ofner	4	4
6	(Slovenia) B Rola	6	6
(Kazakhstan) D Popko	3	4
WC	(Croatia) D Ajduković	2	6	7
PR	(Germany) D Brown	6	4	5
Q	(Bosnia and Herzegovina) M Bašić	7^{7}	6
(Turkey) C İlkel	6^{4}	3
(Netherlands) R Haase	6	4	7^{7}
2	(Australia) M Polmans	3	6	6^{4}

Second round
5	(Serbia) D Petrović	6	6
(Germany) M Marterer	1	3
Q	(Belarus) U Ignatik	6	2	1
(Argentina) A Collarini	2	6	6
6	(Slovenia) B Rola	6	7
WC	(Croatia) D Ajduković	1	5
Q	(Bosnia and Herzegovina) M Bašić	7^{7}	6
(Netherlands) R Haase	6^{4}	3

Quarterfinals
5	(Serbia) D Petrović	2	3
(Argentina) A Collarini	6	6
6	(Slovenia) B Rola	6	6
Q	(Bosnia and Herzegovina) M Bašić	2	4

Semifinals
(Argentina) A Collarini	6^{3}	7^{7}	4
6	(Slovenia) B Rola	7^{7}	6^{3}	6
