= 2022 Split Open – Singles =

Singles
- 2022 Split Open

Final
- Champion: (Australia) Christopher O'Connell
- Runner-up: (Hungary) Zsombor Piros
- Score: 6–3, 2–0 ret.

Events
Singles	Doubles
← 2021 ·	Split Open	· 2023 →

Kacper Żuk was the defending champion but lost in the quarterfinals to Christopher O'Connell.

O'Connell won the title after Zsombor Piros retired trailing 3–6, 0–2 in the final.

== Seeds ==
1. (Czech Republic) Zdeněk Kolář (first round)
2. (Serbia) Nikola Milojević (first round)
3. (Australia) Christopher O'Connell (champion)
4. (Turkey) Altuğ Çelikbilek (second round)
5. (Italy) Thomas Fabbiano (first round)
6. (France) Enzo Couacaud (first round)
7. (Argentina) Marco Trungelliti (first round, retired)
8. (Poland) Kacper Żuk (quarterfinals)

== Draw ==
=== Key ===
- Q = Qualifier
- WC = Wild card
- LL = Lucky loser
- Alt = Alternate
- SE = Special exempt
- PR = Protected ranking
- ITF = ITF entry
- JE = Junior exempt
- w/o = Walkover
- r = Retired
- d = Defaulted
- SR = Special ranking

=== Finals ===
Semifinals
Q	(Italy) Matteo Arnaldi	5	2
3	(Australia) Christopher O'Connell	7	6
Q	(Hungary) Máté Valkusz	4	2
(Hungary) Zsombor Piros	6	6

Final
3	(Australia) Christopher O'Connell	6	2
(Hungary) Zsombor Piros	3	0^{r}

=== Top half ===
First round
1	(Czech Republic) Z Kolář	4	3
(Croatia) D Ajduković	6	6
Q	(Belgium) M Geerts	3	4
Q	(Italy) M Arnaldi	6	6
WC	(Croatia) D Prižmić	4	0
(Italy) A Arnaboldi	6	6
(Croatia) B Gojo	6	6
5	(Italy) T Fabbiano	3	2
3	(Australia) C O'Connell	6	6
(France) G Barrère	2	3
(Slovakia) L Klein	6	7
A Kuznetsov	4	5
WC	(Croatia) L Mikrut	3	6	6^{6}
(Slovenia) B Rola	6	4	7^{8}
WC	(Croatia) M Poljičak	7	2	1
8	(Poland) K Żuk	5	6	6

Second round
(Croatia) D Ajduković	7	4	4
Q	(Italy) M Arnaldi	5	6	6
(Italy) A Arnaboldi	5	6	6
(Croatia) B Gojo	7	4	4
3	(Australia) C O'Connell	6	7
(Slovakia) L Klein	3	5
(Slovenia) B Rola	0	6	2
8	(Poland) K Żuk	6	3	6

Quarterfinals
Q	(Italy) M Arnaldi	6^{5}	7^{7}	6
(Italy) A Arnaboldi	7^{7}	6^{0}	2
3	(Australia) C O'Connell	7^{7}	6
8	(Poland) K Żuk	6^{3}	2

Semifinals
Q	(Italy) M Arnaldi	5	2
3	(Australia) C O'Connell	7	6

=== Bottom half ===
First round
6	(France) E Couacaud	3	1
(Netherlands) J Sels	6	6
Q	(Italy) L Nardi	6	6
Q	(Switzerland) J Nikles	4	3
(Bosnia and Herzegovina) N Fatić	0	3
Q	(Hungary) M Valkusz	6	6
(Italy) R Bonadio	4	2
4	(Turkey) A Çelikbilek	6	6
7/SE	(Argentina) M Trungelliti	2^{r}
(Hungary) Z Piros	4
(Bosnia and Herzegovina) M Bašić	7	6
(France) G Blancaneaux	5	4
Q	A Shevchenko	4	6	6
SE	(Serbia) M Zekić	6	3	2
(France) A Hoang	3	6	6
2	(Serbia) N Milojević	6	4	2

Second round
(Netherlands) J Sels	4	0
Q	(Italy) L Nardi	6	6
Q	(Hungary) M Valkusz	6	6
4	(Turkey) A Çelikbilek	1	1
(Hungary) Z Piros	6	6
(Bosnia and Herzegovina) M Bašić	3	4
Q	A Shevchenko	6	3	6
(France) A Hoang	3	6	3

Quarterfinals
Q	(Italy) L Nardi	4	6^{3}
Q	(Hungary) M Valkusz	6	7^{7}
(Hungary) Z Piros	7^{7}	6
Q	A Shevchenko	6^{4}	2

Semifinals
Q	(Hungary) M Valkusz	4	2
(Hungary) Z Piros	6	6
