= 2021 Split Open – Doubles =

Doubles
- 2021 Split Open

Final
- Champions: (Kazakhstan) Andrey Golubev (Kazakhstan) Aleksandr Nedovyesov
- Runners-up: (Poland) Szymon Walków (Poland) Jan Zieliński
- Score: 7–5, 6–7^{(5–7)}, [10–5]

Events
Singles	Doubles
← 2020 ·	Split Open	· 2021 →

Treat Huey and Nathaniel Lammons were the defending champions but chose not to defend their title.

Andrey Golubev and Aleksandr Nedovyesov won the title after defeating Szymon Walków and Jan Zieliński 7–5, 6–7^{(5–7)}, [10–5] in the final.

== Seeds ==
1. (Kazakhstan) Andrey Golubev / (Kazakhstan) Aleksandr Nedovyesov (champions)
2. (France) Albano Olivetti / (Australia) Matt Reid (semifinals)
3. (United States) Robert Galloway / (United States) Alex Lawson (quarterfinals)
4. (India) Purav Raja / (Austria) Tristan-Samuel Weissborn (quarterfinals)

== Draw ==
=== Key ===
- Q = Qualifier
- WC = Wild card
- LL = Lucky loser
- Alt = Alternate
- SE = Special exempt
- PR = Protected ranking
- ITF = ITF entry
- JE = Junior exempt
- w/o = Walkover
- r = Retired
- d = Defaulted
- SR = Special ranking

First round
1	(Kazakhstan) A Golubev (Kazakhstan) A Nedovyesov	6	6
WC	(Croatia) Karlo Krolo (Croatia) L Mikrut	1	3
(Belgium) K Coppejans (Spain) S Martos Gornés	4	2
(Germany) D Brown (Switzerland) L Margaroli	6	6
4	(India) P Raja (Austria) T-S Weissborn	6	6
WC	(Croatia) Duje Kekez (Croatia) M Poljičak	2	3
WC	(Croatia) D Ajduković (Croatia) Marino Jakić	4	1
(Czech Republic) Z Kolář (Czech Republic) L Rosol	6	6
(France) S Doumbia (France) F Reboul	3	2
(Poland) S Walków (Poland) J Zieliński	6	6
(United States) J Cerretani (Canada) A Shamasdin	6^{5}	5
3	(United States) R Galloway (United States) A Lawson	7^{7}	7
(Serbia) D Petrović (Egypt) M Safwat	3	5
(Croatia) I Sabanov (Croatia) M Sabanov	6	7
(Australia) A Bolt (Australia) M Polmans	6^{4}	7	[9]
2	(France) A Olivetti (Australia) M Reid	7^{7}	5	[11]

Quarterfinals
1	(Kazakhstan) A Golubev (Kazakhstan) A Nedovyesov	6	6
(Germany) D Brown (Switzerland) L Margaroli	2	1
4	(India) P Raja (Austria) T-S Weissborn	3	6	[8]
(Czech Republic) Z Kolář (Czech Republic) L Rosol	6	3	[10]
(Poland) S Walków (Poland) J Zieliński	7	7^{8}
3	(United States) R Galloway (United States) A Lawson	5	6^{6}
(Croatia) I Sabanov (Croatia) M Sabanov	1	5
2	(France) A Olivetti (Australia) M Reid	6	7

Semifinals
1	(Kazakhstan) A Golubev (Kazakhstan) A Nedovyesov	6	2	[10]
(Czech Republic) Z Kolář (Czech Republic) L Rosol	2	6	[6]
(Poland) S Walków (Poland) J Zieliński	6	6
2	(France) A Olivetti (Australia) M Reid	4	4

Final
1	(Kazakhstan) A Golubev (Kazakhstan) A Nedovyesov	7	6^{5}	[10]
(Poland) S Walków (Poland) J Zieliński	5	7^{7}	[5]
