= 2020 Split Open – Doubles =

Doubles
- 2020 Split Open

Final
- Champions: (Philippines) Treat Huey (United States) Nathaniel Lammons
- Runners-up: (Sweden) André Göransson (United States) Hunter Reese
- Score: 6–4, 7–6^{(7–3)}

Events
Singles	Doubles
- Split Open

This was the first edition of the tournament.

Treat Huey and Nathaniel Lammons won the title after defeating André Göransson and Hunter Reese 6–4, 7–6^{(7–3)} in the final.

== Seeds ==
1. (Sweden) André Göransson / (United States) Hunter Reese (final)
2. (Venezuela) Luis David Martínez / (Mexico) Miguel Ángel Reyes-Varela (semifinals)
3. (Philippines) Treat Huey / (United States) Nathaniel Lammons (champions)
4. (Brazil) Orlando Luz / (Brazil) Rafael Matos (semifinals)

== Draw ==
Key

- Q = Qualifier
- WC = Wild card
- LL = Lucky loser
- Alt = Alternate
- ITF = ITF entry
- PR = Protected ranking
- SR = Special ranking
- SE = Special exempt
- JE = Junior exempt
- JR = Junior Accelerator Programme entrant
- CO = College Accelerator Programme entrant
- NG = Next Gen Accelerator Program entrant
- w/o = Walkover
- r = Retired
- d = Defaulted

First round
1	(Sweden) A Göransson (United States) H Reese	6	6
(United States) M Krueger (Brazil) J Menezes	3	4
(United States) B Klahn (Canada) P Polansky	7^{7}	2
(Bosnia and Herzegovina) D Džumhur (Serbia) D Petrović	6^{4}	0^{r}
4	(Brazil) O Luz (Brazil) R Matos	7^{7}	4	[10]
(Brazil) F Romboli (Poland) J Zieliński	6^{5}	6	[7]
(United States) R Galloway (Mexico) H Hach Verdugo	7^{8}	7^{7}
WC	(Croatia) B Gojo (Croatia) M Poljičak	6^{6}	6^{2}
(Bosnia and Herzegovina) T Brkić (Serbia) V Troicki	6	6
WC	(Croatia) Marino Jakić (Croatia) Karlo Krolo	2	4
WC	(Croatia) M Delić (Serbia) P Krstin	4	4
3	(Philippines) T Huey (United States) N Lammons	6	6
(Croatia) I Sabanov (Croatia) M Sabanov	2	6	[6]
(Tunisia) M Jaziri (Portugal) P Sousa	6	4	[10]
(Slovakia) M Kližan (Czech Republic) Z Kolář	4	3
2	(Venezuela) LD Martínez (Mexico) MÁ Reyes-Varela	6	6

Quarterfinals
1	(Sweden) A Göransson (United States) H Reese	w/o
(United States) B Klahn (Canada) P Polansky
4	(Brazil) O Luz (Brazil) R Matos	6	6
(United States) R Galloway (Mexico) H Hach Verdugo	4	0
(Bosnia and Herzegovina) T Brkić (Serbia) V Troicki	2	4
3	(Philippines) T Huey (United States) N Lammons	6	6
(Tunisia) M Jaziri (Portugal) P Sousa	3	2
2	(Venezuela) LD Martínez (Mexico) MÁ Reyes-Varela	6	6

Semifinals
1	(Sweden) A Göransson (United States) H Reese	5	6	[10]
4	(Brazil) O Luz (Brazil) R Matos	7	2	[5]
3	(Philippines) T Huey (United States) N Lammons	6	6
2	(Venezuela) LD Martínez (Mexico) MÁ Reyes-Varela	4	4

Final
1	(Sweden) A Göransson (United States) H Reese	4	6^{3}
3	(Philippines) T Huey (United States) N Lammons	6	7^{7}
