= 2022 Split Open – Doubles =

Doubles
- 2022 Split Open

Final
- Champions: (United States) Nathaniel Lammons (France) Albano Olivetti
- Runners-up: (France) Sadio Doumbia (France) Fabien Reboul
- Score: 4–6, 7–6^{(8–6)}, [10–7]

Events
Singles	Doubles
- Split Open

Szymon Walków and Jan Zieliński were the defending champions but chose not to defend his title.

Nathaniel Lammons and Albano Olivetti won the title after defeating Sadio Doumbia and Fabien Reboul 4–6, 7–6^{(8–6)}, [10–7] in the final.

== Seeds ==
1. (France) Sadio Doumbia / (France) Fabien Reboul (final)
2. (United States) Nathaniel Lammons / (France) Albano Olivetti (champions)
3. (India) Arjun Kadhe / (Spain) Sergio Martos Gornés (semifinals)
4. (Ukraine) Denys Molchanov / (Germany) Niklas Schell (semifinals)

== Draw ==
Key

- Q = Qualifier
- WC = Wild card
- LL = Lucky loser
- Alt = Alternate
- ITF = ITF entry
- PR = Protected ranking
- SR = Special ranking
- SE = Special exempt
- JE = Junior exempt
- JR = Junior Accelerator Programme entrant
- CO = College Accelerator Programme entrant
- NG = Next Gen Accelerator Program entrant
- w/o = Walkover
- r = Retired
- d = Defaulted

First round
1	(France) S Doumbia (France) F Reboul	6	6
Alt	B Bobrov (Belgium) Christopher Heyman	1	3
(Turkey) A Çelikbilek (Uzbekistan) K Sultanov	2	6	[11]
Alt	(Croatia) D Ajduković (Croatia) F Ninčević	6	4	[9]
4	(Ukraine) D Molchanov (Germany) Niklas Schell	6	6
(Slovakia) L Klein; A Kuznetsov	4	4
(Hungary) Z Piros (Bosnia and Herzegovina) A Šetkić	7	6
Alt	(Ukraine) G Kravchenko (Finland) O Virtanen	5	3
(France) G Barrère (France) L Van Assche	6	7
(Poland) D Michalski; A Shevchenko	2	5
(France) G Blancaneaux (France) A Hoang	6^{2}	4
3	(India) A Kadhe (Spain) S Martos Gornés	7^{7}	6
(Belgium) M Geerts (Ukraine) V Manafov	5	7^{7}	[13]
(France) T Arribagé (France) E Couacaud	7	6^{4}	[11]
WC	(Croatia) L Mikrut (Croatia) D Prižmić	3	3
2	(United States) N Lammons (France) A Olivetti	6	6

Quarterfinals
1	(France) S Doumbia (France) F Reboul	6	6
(Turkey) A Çelikbilek (Uzbekistan) K Sultanov	3	3
4	(Ukraine) D Molchanov (Germany) N Schell	3	6	[10]
(Hungary) Z Piros (Bosnia and Herzegovina) A Šetkić	6	4	[8]
(France) G Barrère (France) L Van Assche
3	(India) A Kadhe (Spain) S Martos Gornés	w/o
(Belgium) M Geerts (Ukraine) V Manafov	3	3
2	(United States) N Lammons (France) A Olivetti	6	6

Semifinals
1	(France) S Doumbia (France) F Reboul	6	6
4	(Ukraine) D Molchanov (Germany) N Schell	2	4
3	(India) A Kadhe (Spain) S Martos Gornés	6	6^{5}	[6]
2	(United States) N Lammons (France) A Olivetti	3	7^{7}	[10]

Final
1	(France) S Doumbia (France) F Reboul	6	6^{6}	[7]
2	(United States) N Lammons (France) A Olivetti	4	7^{8}	[10]
