= 2023 Split Open – Singles =

Singles
- 2023 Split Open

Final
- Champion: (Hungary) Zsombor Piros
- Runner-up: (Slovakia) Norbert Gombos
- Score: 7–6^{(7–2)}, 7–6^{(11–9)}

Events
Singles	Doubles
← 2022 ·	Split Open	· 2024 →

Christopher O'Connell was the defending champion but lost in the semifinals to Zsombor Piros.

Piros won the title after defeating Norbert Gombos 7–6^{(7–2)}, 7–6^{(11–9)} in the final.

== Seeds ==
1. (Australia) Christopher O'Connell (semifinals)
2. (Austria) Jurij Rodionov (first round)
3. (Slovakia) Norbert Gombos (final)
4. (Hungary) Fábián Marozsán (first round)
5. (Slovakia) Lukáš Klein (first round)
6. (Austria) Filip Misolic (quarterfinals)
7. (Italy) Mattia Bellucci (first round)
8. (Japan) Kaichi Uchida (first round)

== Draw ==
=== Key ===
- Q = Qualifier
- WC = Wild card
- LL = Lucky loser
- Alt = Alternate
- SE = Special exempt
- PR = Protected ranking
- ITF = ITF entry
- JE = Junior exempt
- w/o = Walkover
- r = Retired
- d = Defaulted
- SR = Special ranking

=== Finals ===
Semifinals
1	(Australia) Christopher O'Connell	2	4
(Hungary) Zsombor Piros	6	6
3	(Slovakia) Norbert Gombos	6	6
PR	(Australia) Marc Polmans	2	4

Final
(Hungary) Zsombor Piros	7^{7}	7^{11}
3	(Slovakia) Norbert Gombos	6^{2}	6^{9}

=== Top half ===
First round
1	(Australia) C O'Connell	7^{7}	6
Q	(Australia) D Sweeny	6^{5}	2
(France) E Furness	3	5
Q	(Bosnia and Herzegovina) N Fatić	6	7
(Argentina) S Rodríguez Taverna	6	3	4
WC	(Croatia) D Prižmić	4	6	6
Q	(France) A Cazaux	6	7
7	(Italy) M Bellucci	3	5
4	(Hungary) F Marozsán	3	3
(Hungary) Z Piros	6	6
Alt	(France) H Mayot	2	6	2
SE	(Japan) S Mochizuki	6	1	6
(France) G Debru	6	2	4
(France) M Guinard	4	6	6
Q	(Moldova) R Albot	6	7
8	(Japan) K Uchida	1	5

Second round
1	(Australia) C O'Connell	6	6
Q	(Bosnia and Herzegovina) N Fatić	1	3
WC	(Croatia) D Prižmić	7	6
Q	(France) A Cazaux	5	2
(Hungary) Z Piros	6	7^{7}
SE	(Japan) S Mochizuki	4	6^{1}
(France) M Guinard	5	3
Q	(Moldova) R Albot	7	6

Quarterfinals
1	(Australia) C O'Connell	6	7
WC	(Croatia) D Prižmić	2	5
(Hungary) Z Piros	7^{7}	5	6
Q	(Moldova) R Albot	6^{5}	7	3

Semifinals
1	(Australia) C O'Connell	2	4
(Hungary) Z Piros	6	6

=== Bottom half ===
First round
5	(Slovakia) L Klein	6	3	6^{5}
(Hungary) M Valkusz	3	6	7^{7}
(Italy) F Maestrelli	7^{7}	6
(Serbia) H Međedović	6^{3}	1
Q	(Poland) K Żuk	6	7^{10}
(Argentina) M Navone	4	6^{8}
(Italy) F Cobolli	1	6	1
3	(Slovakia) N Gombos	6	3	6
6	(Austria) F Misolic	6	6
(Romania) ND Ionel	3	3
(Belgium) K Coppejans	6	3	3
Q	(Sweden) E Ymer	3	6	6
WC	(Croatia) D Ajduković	6^{3}	6	6
WC	(North Macedonia) K Ivanovski	7^{7}	1	1
PR	(Australia) M Polmans	6	4	6
2	(Austria) J Rodionov	4	6	3

Second round
(Hungary) M Valkusz	6	1	6
(Italy) F Maestrelli	2	6	2
Q	(Poland) K Żuk	3	6	6^{6}
3	(Slovakia) N Gombos	6	3	7^{8}
6	(Austria) F Misolic	4	7^{8}	7^{7}
Q	(Sweden) E Ymer	6	6^{6}	6^{1}
WC	(Croatia) D Ajduković	6^{5}	6^{5}
PR	(Australia) M Polmans	7^{7}	7^{7}

Quarterfinals
(Hungary) M Valkusz	6^{10}	3
3	(Slovakia) N Gombos	7^{12}	6
6	(Austria) F Misolic	3	3
PR	(Australia) M Polmans	6	6

Semifinals
3	(Slovakia) N Gombos	6	6
PR	(Australia) M Polmans	2	4
