= 2021 Split Open II – Doubles =

Doubles
- 2021 Split Open II

Final
- Champions: (Poland) Szymon Walków (Poland) Jan Zieliński
- Runners-up: (France) Grégoire Barrère (France) Albano Olivetti
- Score: 6–2, 7–5

Events
Singles	Doubles
← 2021 ·	Split Open	· 2022 →

Andrey Golubev and Aleksandr Nedovyesov were the defending champions but lost in the semifinals to Szymon Walków and Jan Zieliński.

Walków and Zieliński won the title after defeating Grégoire Barrère and Albano Olivetti 6–2, 7–5 in the final.

== Seeds ==
1. (Ukraine) Denys Molchanov / (Australia) Matt Reid (quarterfinals)
2. (Kazakhstan) Andrey Golubev / (Kazakhstan) Aleksandr Nedovyesov (semifinals)
3. (United States) Robert Galloway / (United States) Alex Lawson (semifinals)
4. (India) Purav Raja / (Austria) Tristan-Samuel Weissborn (first round)

== Draw ==
=== Key ===
- Q = Qualifier
- WC = Wild card
- LL = Lucky loser
- Alt = Alternate
- SE = Special exempt
- PR = Protected ranking
- ITF = ITF entry
- JE = Junior exempt
- w/o = Walkover
- r = Retired
- d = Defaulted
- SR = Special ranking

First round
1	(Ukraine) D Molchanov (Australia) M Reid	6	6
(Belgium) K Coppejans (Spain) S Martos Gornés	3	3
(France) G Barrère (France) A Olivetti	4	7	[10]
(Croatia) I Sabanov (Croatia) M Sabanov	6	5	[6]
3	(United States) R Galloway (United States) A Lawson	6	6
(United States) J Cerretani (France) Q Halys	2	4
(France) S Doumbia (France) F Reboul	7	6
WC	(Croatia) Marino Jakić (Croatia) Karlo Krolo	5	3
(Poland) K Drzewiecki (Germany) D Masur	2	6^{5}
WC	(Croatia) D Ajduković (Croatia) F Ninčević	6	7^{7}
(Poland) S Walków (Poland) J Zieliński	6	6
4	(India) P Raja (Austria) T-S Weissborn	3	4
(Czech Republic) Z Kolář (Czech Republic) L Rosol	6	6
(Switzerland) L Margaroli (Canada) A Shamasdin	3	2
WC	(Croatia) B Gojo (Croatia) N Serdarušić	7^{8}	6^{4}	[7]
2	(Kazakhstan) A Golubev (Kazakhstan) A Nedovyesov	6^{6}	7^{7}	[10]

Quarterfinals
1	(Ukraine) D Molchanov (Australia) M Reid	6^{2}	4
(France) G Barrère (France) A Olivetti	7^{7}	6
3	(United States) R Galloway (United States) A Lawson	6	6
(France) S Doumbia (France) F Reboul	1	2
WC	(Croatia) D Ajduković (Croatia) F Ninčević	0	4
(Poland) S Walków (Poland) J Zieliński	6	6
(Czech Republic) Z Kolář (Czech Republic) L Rosol	6	3	[8]
2	(Kazakhstan) A Golubev (Kazakhstan) A Nedovyesov	3	6	[10]

Semifinals
(France) G Barrère (France) A Olivetti	3	7	[10]
3	(United States) R Galloway (United States) A Lawson	6	5	[8]
(Poland) S Walków (Poland) J Zieliński	6	7^{7}
2	(Kazakhstan) A Golubev (Kazakhstan) A Nedovyesov	3	6^{1}

Final
(France) G Barrère (France) A Olivetti	2	5
(Poland) S Walków (Poland) J Zieliński	6	7
