= 2021 Split Open =

- Date: 5–11 April 2021
- Edition: 2nd
- Surface: Clay
- Location: Split, Croatia

Champions

Singles
- (Slovenia) Blaž Rola

Doubles
- (Kazakhstan) Andrey Golubev / (Kazakhstan) Aleksandr Nedovyesov
← 2020 ·	Split Open	· 2021 →

The 2021 Split Open was a professional tennis tournament played on clay courts. It was part of the 2021 ATP Challenger Tour. It took place in Split, Croatia between 5 and 11 April 2021.

== Singles main-draw entrants ==
=== Seeds ===
Country	Player	Rank^{1}	Seed
POR	Pedro Sousa	111	1
AUS	Marc Polmans	137	2
AUT	Sebastian Ofner	152	3
EGY	Mohamed Safwat	159	4
SRB	Danilo Petrović	160	5
SLO	Blaž Rola	166	6
BEL	Kimmer Coppejans	170	7
SVK	Filip Horanský	175	8

- Rankings are as of 22 March 2021.

=== Other entrants ===
The following players received wildcards into the singles main draw:

- (Croatia) Duje Ajduković
- (Croatia) Mili Poljičak
- (Croatia) Nino Serdarušić

The following players received entry into the singles main draw using protected rankings:

- (Germany) Dustin Brown
- (Australia) Thanasi Kokkinakis

The following player received entry into the singles main draw as a special exempt:

- (Czech Republic) Zdeněk Kolář

The following player received entry into the singles main draw as an alternate:

- (Poland) Kacper Żuk

The following players received entry from the qualifying draw:

- (Bosnia and Herzegovina) Mirza Bašić
- (Belarus) Uladzimir Ignatik
- (Slovenia) Blaž Kavčič
- (Australia) Akira Santillan

== Champions ==
=== Singles ===
- (Slovenia) Blaž Rola def. (Slovenia) Blaž Kavčič 2–6, 6–3, 6–2.

=== Doubles ===
- (Kazakhstan) Andrey Golubev / (Kazakhstan) Aleksandr Nedovyesov def. (Poland) Szymon Walków / (Poland) Jan Zieliński 7–5, 6–7^{(5–7)}, [10–5].
