= 2023 Split Open – Doubles =

Doubles
- 2023 Split Open

Final
- Champions: (France) Sadio Doumbia (France) Fabien Reboul
- Runners-up: (India) Anirudh Chandrasekar (India) Vijay Sundar Prashanth
- Score: 6–4, 6–4

Events
Singles	Doubles
- Split Open

Nathaniel Lammons and Albano Olivetti were the defending champions but chose not to defend their title.

Sadio Doumbia and Fabien Reboul won the title after defeating Anirudh Chandrasekar and Vijay Sundar Prashanth 6–4, 6–4 in the final.

== Seeds ==
1. (France) Sadio Doumbia / (France) Fabien Reboul (champions)
2. (Ecuador) Diego Hidalgo / (Colombia) Cristian Rodríguez (quarterfinals, withdrew)
3. (Czech Republic) Roman Jebavý / (Croatia) Franko Škugor (first round)
4. (Poland) Karol Drzewiecki / (Poland) Szymon Walków (first round)

== Draw ==
Key

- Q = Qualifier
- WC = Wild card
- LL = Lucky loser
- Alt = Alternate
- ITF = ITF entry
- PR = Protected ranking
- SR = Special ranking
- SE = Special exempt
- JE = Junior exempt
- JR = Junior Accelerator Programme entrant
- CO = College Accelerator Programme entrant
- NG = Next Gen Accelerator Program entrant
- w/o = Walkover
- r = Retired
- d = Defaulted

First round
1	(France) S Doumbia (France) F Reboul	6	6
(Croatia) Z Babić (Sweden) F Bergevi	3	3
(Australia) C Puttergill (Australia) D Sweeny	3	7	[8]
(Latvia) M Lībietis (United States) H Reese	6	5	[10]
3	(Czech Republic) R Jebavý (Croatia) F Škugor	6^{7}	7^{7}	[5]
(Ukraine) D Molchanov (Poland) K Żuk	7^{9}	6^{5}	[10]
(Australia) J Taylor (Germany) K Wehnelt	6	7^{7}
(Poland) P Matuszewski (Ukraine) O Prihodko	4	6^{4}
WC	(North Macedonia) K Ivanovski (Croatia) L Mikrut	6	6
(United Kingdom) S Duncan (United Kingdom) M Willis	4	3
Alt	(Argentina) M Navone (Argentina) JB Torres	6	3	[10]
4	(Poland) K Drzewiecki (Poland) S Walków	4	6	[6]
(India) A Chandrasekar (India) VS Prashanth	6	6
(New Zealand) A Sitak (Japan) K Uchida	2	1
(Romania) ND Ionel (Romania) A Jecan	3	3
2	(Ecuador) D Hidalgo (Colombia) C Rodríguez	6	6

Quarterfinals
1	(France) S Doumbia (France) F Reboul	7^{7}	7
(Latvia) M Lībietis (United States) H Reese	6^{4}	5
(Ukraine) D Molchanov (Poland) K Żuk	7	4	[10]
(Australia) J Taylor (Germany) K Wehnelt	5	6	[7]
WC	(North Macedonia) K Ivanovski (Croatia) L Mikrut	6	6
Alt	(Argentina) M Navone (Argentina) JB Torres	2	4
(India) A Chandrasekar (India) VS Prashanth	w/o
2	(Ecuador) D Hidalgo (Colombia) C Rodríguez

Semifinals
1	(France) S Doumbia (France) F Reboul	7	6
(Ukraine) D Molchanov (Poland) K Żuk	5	1
WC	(North Macedonia) K Ivanovski (Croatia) L Mikrut
(India) A Chandrasekar (India) VS Prashanth	w/o

Final
1	(France) S Doumbia (France) F Reboul	6	6
(India) A Chandrasekar (India) VS Prashanth	4	4
