= 2022 Split Open =

- Date: 18–24 April 2022
- Edition: 4th
- Surface: Clay
- Location: Split, Croatia

Champions

Singles
- (Australia) Christopher O'Connell

Doubles
- (United States) Nathaniel Lammons / (France) Albano Olivetti
| ← 2021 · | Split Open | · 2023 → |

The 2022 Split Open was a professional tennis tournament played on clay courts. It was part of the 2022 ATP Challenger Tour. It took place in Split, Croatia between 18 and 24 April 2022.

== Singles main-draw entrants ==
=== Seeds ===
| Country | Player | Rank^{1} | Seed |
|---|---|---|---|
| CZE | Zdeněk Kolář | 141 | 1 |
| SRB | Nikola Milojević | 148 | 2 |
| AUS | Christopher O'Connell | 150 | 3 |
| TUR | Altuğ Çelikbilek | 174 | 4 |
| ITA | Thomas Fabbiano | 178 | 5 |
| FRA | Enzo Couacaud | 179 | 6 |
| ARG | Marco Trungelliti | 194 | 7 |
| POL | Kacper Żuk | 200 | 8 |

- Rankings are as of 11 April 2022.

=== Other entrants ===
The following players received wildcards into the singles main draw:

- (Croatia) Luka Mikrut
- (Croatia) Mili Poljičak
- (Croatia) Dino Prižmić

The following players received entry into the singles main draw as special exempts:

- (Argentina) Marco Trungelliti
- (Serbia) Miljan Zekić

The following players received entry from the qualifying draw:

- (Italy) Matteo Arnaldi
- (Belgium) Michael Geerts
- (Italy) Luca Nardi
- (Switzerland) Johan Nikles
- Alexander Shevchenko
- (Hungary) Máté Valkusz

== Champions ==
=== Singles ===
- (Australia) Christopher O'Connell def. (Hungary) Zsombor Piros 6–3, 2–0 ret.

=== Doubles ===
- (United States) Nathaniel Lammons / (France) Albano Olivetti def. (France) Sadio Doumbia / (France) Fabien Reboul 4–6, 7–6^{(8–6)}, [10–7].
