= 2026 Split Open – Singles =

Singles
- 2026 Split Open

Final
- Champion: (Croatia) Mili Poljičak
- Runner-up: (Germany) Tom Gentzsch
- Score: 6–4, 6–4

Events
Singles	Doubles
- Split Open

Jozef Kovalík was the defending champion but chose not to defend his title.

Mili Poljičak won the title after defeating Tom Gentzsch 6–4, 6–4 in the final.

== Seeds ==
1. (Croatia) Matej Dodig (quarterfinals, retired)
2. (United Kingdom) George Loffhagen (first round)
3. (Austria) Lukas Neumayer (quarterfinals)
4. (Bosnia and Herzegovina) Nerman Fatić (first round)
5. (Portugal) Frederico Ferreira Silva (second round)
6. (Belgium) Kimmer Coppejans (semifinals)
7. (Germany) Tom Gentzsch (final)
8. (United Kingdom) Felix Gill (second round)

== Draw ==
Key

- Q = Qualifier
- WC = Wild card
- LL = Lucky loser
- Alt = Alternate
- ITF = ITF entry
- PR = Protected ranking
- SR = Special ranking
- SE = Special exempt
- JE = Junior exempt
- JR = Junior Accelerator Programme entrant
- CO = College Accelerator Programme entrant
- NG = Next Gen Accelerator Program entrant
- w/o = Walkover
- r = Retired
- d = Defaulted

=== Finals ===
Semifinals
WC	(Croatia) Mili Poljičak	3	6	6
6	(Belgium) Kimmer Coppejans	6	4	4
(France) Sascha Gueymard Wayenburg	5	4
7	(Germany) Tom Gentzsch	7	6

Final
WC	(Croatia) Mili Poljičak	6	6
7	(Germany) Tom Gentzsch	4	4

=== Top half ===
First round
1	(Croatia) M Dodig	3	7	6
Alt	(United States) Christian Langmo	6	5	2
Q	(Turkey) E Kırkın	4	1
(Austria) S Kopp	6	6
WC	(Croatia) M Poljičak	6	4	6
WC	(Croatia) Emanuel Ivanišević	2	6	2
(Czech Republic) M Krumich	3	5
8	(United Kingdom) F Gill	6	7
3	(Austria) L Neumayer	7^{7}	6
Q	(Italy) Juan Cruz Martin Manzano	6^{4}	3
(Croatia) D Ajduković	7^{7}	6
Q	(South Korea) G Campaña Lee	6^{1}	1
(Spain) D Rincón	4	4
(Czech Republic) M Mrva	6	6
Q	(Ukraine) O Krutykh	3	2
6	(Belgium) K Coppejans	6	6

Second round
1	(Croatia) M Dodig	6	3	6
(Austria) S Kopp	4	6	2
WC	(Croatia) M Poljičak	6	6
8	(United Kingdom) F Gill	1	2
3	(Austria) L Neumayer	6	6
(Croatia) D Ajduković	2	3
(Czech Republic) M Mrva	4	6	6^{3}
6	(Belgium) K Coppejans	6	2	7^{7}

Quarterfinals
1	(Croatia) M Dodig	1^{r}
WC	(Croatia) M Poljičak	4
3	(Austria) L Neumayer	4	3
6	(Belgium) K Coppejans	6	6

Semifinals
WC	(Croatia) M Poljičak	3	6	6
6	(Belgium) K Coppejans	6	4	4

=== Bottom half ===
First round
5	(Portugal) F Ferreira Silva	6	6
(Poland) D Michalski	4	2
(Italy) J Berrettini	1	0
(France) S Gueymard Wayenburg	6	6
(Bosnia and Herzegovina) A Nedić	6	6
(Netherlands) J Sels	1	4
(Bulgaria) D Kuzmanov	6	6
4	(Bosnia and Herzegovina) N Fatić	3	1
7	(Germany) T Gentzsch	7	6
(Czech Republic) J Forejtek	5	1
Q	(Germany) Adrian Oetzbach	3	6^{4}
Q	(Italy) F Romano	6	7^{7}
WC	(Croatia) Josip Šimundža	3	6	3
(Ivory Coast) E Coulibaly	6	4	6
JR	(Bulgaria) A Vasilev	7	6
2	(United Kingdom) G Loffhagen	5	4

Second round
5	(Portugal) F Ferreira Silva	6	3	4
(France) S Gueymard Wayenburg	2	6	6
(Bosnia and Herzegovina) A Nedić	7^{12}	6
(Bulgaria) D Kuzmanov	6^{10}	1
7	(Germany) T Gentzsch	7^{10}	6
Q	(Italy) F Romano	6^{8}	0
(Ivory Coast) E Coulibaly	3	2
JR	(Bulgaria) A Vasilev	6	6

Quarterfinals
(France) S Gueymard Wayenburg	6	7
(Bosnia and Herzegovina) A Nedić	1	5
7	(Germany) T Gentzsch	6	6
JR	(Bulgaria) A Vasilev	0	2

Semifinals
(France) S Gueymard Wayenburg	5	4
7	(Germany) T Gentzsch	7	6
