= 2023 Split Open =

- Date: 10–16 April
- Edition: 5th
- Surface: Clay
- Location: Split, Croatia

Champions

Singles
- (Hungary) Zsombor Piros

Doubles
- (France) Sadio Doumbia / (France) Fabien Reboul
← 2022 ·	Split Open	· 2024 →

The 2023 Split Open was a professional tennis tournament played on clay courts. It was part of the 2023 ATP Challenger Tour. It took place in Split, Croatia between 10 and 16 April 2023.

== Singles main-draw entrants ==
=== Seeds ===
Country	Player	Rank^{1}	Seed
AUS	Christopher O'Connell	87	1
AUT	Jurij Rodionov	120	2
SVK	Norbert Gombos	130	3
HUN	Fábián Marozsán	133	4
SVK	Lukáš Klein	139	5
AUT	Filip Misolic	146	6
ITA	Mattia Bellucci	154	7
JPN	Kaichi Uchida	162	8

- Rankings are as of 3 April 2023.

=== Other entrants ===
The following players received wildcards into the singles main draw:

- (Croatia) Duje Ajduković
- (North Macedonia) Kalin Ivanovski
- (Croatia) Dino Prižmić

The following player received entry into the singles main draw as a special exempt:

- (Japan) Shintaro Mochizuki

The following player received entry into the singles main draw using a protected ranking:

- (Australia) Marc Polmans

The following player received entry into the singles main draw as an alternate:

- (France) Harold Mayot

The following players received entry from the qualifying draw:

- (Moldova) Radu Albot
- (France) Arthur Cazaux
- (Bosnia and Herzegovina) Nerman Fatić
- (Australia) Dane Sweeny
- (Sweden) Elias Ymer
- (Poland) Kacper Żuk

== Champions ==
=== Singles ===
- (Hungary) Zsombor Piros def. (Slovakia) Norbert Gombos 7–6^{(7–2)}, 7–6^{(11–9)}.

=== Doubles ===
- (France) Sadio Doumbia / (France) Fabien Reboul def. (India) Anirudh Chandrasekar / (India) Vijay Sundar Prashanth 6–4, 6–4.
