= 2026 Split Open – Doubles =

Doubles
- 2026 Split Open

Final
- Champions: (Slovakia) Miloš Karol (Croatia) Mili Poljičak
- Runners-up: (Bosnia and Herzegovina) Mirza Bašić (Bosnia and Herzegovina) Andrej Nedić
- Score: 6–2, 6–2

Events
Singles	Doubles
- Split Open

Jonathan Eysseric and Bart Stevens were the defending champions but chose not to defend their title.

Miloš Karol and Mili Poljičak won the title after defeating Mirza Bašić and Andrej Nedić 6–2, 6–2 in the final.

== Seeds ==
1. (Netherlands) Mats Hermans / (Australia) Calum Puttergill (first round)
2. (United Kingdom) Scott Duncan / (United Kingdom) Ben Jones (first round)
3. (Serbia) Ivan Sabanov / (Serbia) Matej Sabanov (first round)
4. (Slovakia) Miloš Karol / (Croatia) Mili Poljičak (champions)

== Draw ==
Key

- Q = Qualifier
- WC = Wild card
- LL = Lucky loser
- Alt = Alternate
- ITF = ITF entry
- PR = Protected ranking
- SR = Special ranking
- SE = Special exempt
- JE = Junior exempt
- JR = Junior Accelerator Programme entrant
- CO = College Accelerator Programme entrant
- NG = Next Gen Accelerator Program entrant
- w/o = Walkover
- r = Retired
- d = Defaulted

First round
1	(Netherlands) M Hermans (Australia) C Puttergill	3	7^{7}	[7]
(United Kingdom) C Thomson (United Kingdom) M Whitehouse	6	6^{3}	[10]
(Austria) S Kopp (Austria) L Neumayer	6^{4}	6	[10]
(Italy) Simone Agostini (Finland) E Vasa	7^{7}	3	[8]
4	(Slovakia) M Karol (Croatia) M Poljičak	7	6
(Turkey) E Kırkın (Netherlands) J Sels	5	3
WC	(Serbia) Stefan Popović (Croatia) Josip Šimundža	6	4	[10]
(Croatia) D Ajduković (Croatia) A Kalender	4	6	[5]
(Venezuela) Juan José Bianchi (Venezuela) B Pérez	1	4
WC	(Croatia) M Dodig (Croatia) Emanuel Ivanišević	6	6
(United Kingdom) T Hands (Czech Republic) J Jermář	7	6
3	(Serbia) I Sabanov (Serbia) M Sabanov	5	4
Alt	(South Korea) G Campaña Lee (Ukraine) O Krutykh	6	4	[7]
(United Kingdom) F Bass (Bulgaria) A Genov	4	6	[10]
(Bosnia and Herzegovina) M Bašić (Bosnia and Herzegovina) A Nedić	6	2	[10]
2	(United Kingdom) S Duncan (United Kingdom) B Jones	2	6	[5]

Quarterfinals
(United Kingdom) C Thomson (United Kingdom) M Whitehouse
(Austria) S Kopp (Austria) L Neumayer	w/o
4	(Slovakia) M Karol (Croatia) M Poljičak	6	6
WC	(Serbia) S Popović (Croatia) J Šimundža	2	2
WC	(Croatia) M Dodig (Croatia) E Ivanišević
(United Kingdom) T Hands (Czech Republic) J Jermář	w/o
(United Kingdom) F Bass (Bulgaria) A Genov	4	6	[8]
(Bosnia and Herzegovina) M Bašić (Bosnia and Herzegovina) A Nedić	6	4	[10]

Semifinals
(Austria) S Kopp (Austria) L Neumayer
4	(Slovakia) M Karol (Croatia) M Poljičak	w/o
(United Kingdom) T Hands (Czech Republic) J Jermář	4	6	[8]
(Bosnia and Herzegovina) M Bašić (Bosnia and Herzegovina) A Nedić	6	4	[10]

Final
4	(Slovakia) M Karol (Croatia) M Poljičak	6	6
(Bosnia and Herzegovina) M Bašić (Bosnia and Herzegovina) A Nedić	2	2
