= 2021 Split Open II – Singles =

Singles
- 2021 Split Open II

Final
- Champion: (Poland) Kacper Żuk
- Runner-up: (France) Mathias Bourgue
- Score: 6–4, 6–2

Events
Singles	Doubles
← 2021 ·	Split Open	· 2022 →

Blaž Rola was the defending champion but chose not to defend his title.

Kacper Żuk won the title after defeating Mathias Bourgue 6–4, 6–2 in the final.

== Seeds ==
1. (France) Grégoire Barrère (first round)
2. (Australia) Marc Polmans (first round)
3. (France) Hugo Gaston (second round)
4. (Egypt) Mohamed Safwat (first round)
5. (Belgium) Kimmer Coppejans (first round)
6. (Italy) Lorenzo Giustino (first round)
7. (Slovakia) Filip Horanský (second round)
8. (Canada) Steven Diez (first round)

== Draw ==
=== Key ===
- Q = Qualifier
- WC = Wild card
- LL = Lucky loser
- Alt = Alternate
- SE = Special exempt
- PR = Protected ranking
- ITF = ITF entry
- JE = Junior exempt
- w/o = Walkover
- r = Retired
- d = Defaulted
- SR = Special ranking

=== Finals ===
Semifinals
(France) Quentin Halys	6^{8}	0^{r}
(France) Mathias Bourgue	7^{10}	0
(Sweden) Elias Ymer	7^{7}	0	1
Q	(Poland) Kacper Żuk	6^{5}	6	6

Final
(France) Mathias Bourgue	4	2
Q	(Poland) Kacper Żuk	6	6

=== Top half ===
First round
1	(France) G Barrère	3	3
SE	(Argentina) P Cachin	6	6
(Germany) D Masur	3	2
(France) Q Halys	6	6
PR	(Australia) T Kokkinakis	6	5	6
WC	(Croatia) D Ajduković	4	7	3
PR	(Germany) D Brown	5	2
7	(Slovakia) F Horanský	7	6
4	(Egypt) M Safwat	6	2	4
(France) M Bourgue	3	6	6
(Australia) A Bolt	1	3
(Portugal) J Domingues	6	6
Q	(Bosnia and Herzegovina) M Bašić	6	6
(Uzbekistan) D Istomin	3	1
LL	(Argentina) A Collarini	6	6
6	(Italy) L Giustino	4	4

Second round
SE	(Argentina) P Cachin	2	6^{2}
(France) Q Halys	6	7^{7}
PR	(Australia) T Kokkinakis	6	6
7	(Slovakia) F Horanský	1	2
(France) M Bourgue	6	6
(Portugal) J Domingues	3	4
Q	(Bosnia and Herzegovina) M Bašić	6	6
LL	(Argentina) A Collarini	4	4

Quarterfinals
(France) Q Halys	6	7^{7}
PR	(Australia) T Kokkinakis	3	6^{2}
(France) M Bourgue	6	1	7
Q	(Bosnia and Herzegovina) M Bašić	4	6	5

Semifinals
(France) Q Halys	6^{8}	0^{r}
(France) M Bourgue	7^{10}	0

=== Bottom half ===
First round
5	(Belgium) K Coppejans	3	4
WC	(Croatia) N Serdarušić	6	6
(France) A Müller	5	4
(Sweden) E Ymer	7	6
(Turkey) C İlkel	6	7^{7}
(France) E Couacaud	2	6^{4}
Q	(Slovakia) L Klein	3	6	3
3	(France) H Gaston	6	3	6
8	(Canada) S Diez	3	5
(Germany) M Marterer	6	7
Q	(Poland) K Żuk	6	7^{7}
(Czech Republic) L Rosol	4	6^{4}
WC	(Croatia) Duje Kekez	2	6^{4}
(Australia) A Vukic	6	7^{7}
Q	(Czech Republic) Z Kolář	6	6
2	(Australia) M Polmans	2	2

Second round
WC	(Croatia) N Serdarušić	6^{2}	7	3
(Sweden) E Ymer	7^{7}	5	6
(Turkey) C İlkel	2	6	7^{9}
3	(France) H Gaston	6	3	6^{7}
(Germany) M Marterer	4	6^{4}
Q	(Poland) K Żuk	6	7^{7}
(Australia) A Vukic	7^{7}	6
Q	(Czech Republic) Z Kolář	6^{5}	4

Quarterfinals
(Sweden) E Ymer	6	6
(Turkey) C İlkel	3	4
Q	(Poland) K Żuk	6	6
(Australia) A Vukic	4	1

Semifinals
(Sweden) E Ymer	7^{7}	0	1
Q	(Poland) K Żuk	6^{5}	6	6
