= 2021 Split Open II =

- Date: 12–18 April 2021
- Edition: 3rd
- Surface: Clay
- Location: Split, Croatia

Champions

Singles
- (Poland) Kacper Żuk

Doubles
- (Poland) Szymon Walków / (Poland) Jan Zieliński
| ← 2021 · | Split Open | · 2022 → |

The 2021 Split Open II was a professional tennis tournament played on clay courts. It was part of the 2021 ATP Challenger Tour. It took place in Split, Croatia between 12 and 18 April 2021.

== Singles main-draw entrants ==
=== Seeds ===
| Country | Player | Rank^{1} | Seed |
|---|---|---|---|
| FRA | Grégoire Barrère | 116 | 1 |
| AUS | Marc Polmans | 149 | 2 |
| FRA | Hugo Gaston | 158 | 3 |
| EGY | Mohamed Safwat | 160 | 4 |
| BEL | Kimmer Coppejans | 168 | 5 |
| ITA | Lorenzo Giustino | 169 | 6 |
| SVK | Filip Horanský | 175 | 7 |
| CAN | Steven Diez | 177 | 8 |

- Rankings are as of 5 April 2021.

=== Other entrants ===
The following players received wildcards into the singles main draw:

- (Croatia) Duje Ajduković
- (Croatia) Duje Kekez
- (Croatia) Nino Serdarušić

The following players received entry into the singles main draw using protected rankings:

- (Germany) Dustin Brown
- (Australia) Thanasi Kokkinakis

The following players received entry into the singles main draw as special exempts:

- (Argentina) Pedro Cachin
- (Slovenia) ~~Blaž Kavčič~~

The following players received entry from the qualifying draw:

- (Bosnia and Herzegovina) Mirza Bašić
- (Slovakia) Lukáš Klein
- (Czech Republic) Zdeněk Kolář
- (Poland) Kacper Żuk

The following player received entry as a lucky loser:

- (Argentina) Andrea Collarini

== Champions ==
=== Singles ===
- (Poland) Kacper Żuk def. (France) Mathias Bourgue 6–4, 6–2.

=== Doubles ===
- (Poland) Szymon Walków / (Poland) Jan Zieliński def. (France) Grégoire Barrère / (France) Albano Olivetti 6–2, 7–5.
