= 2020 Split Open – Singles =

Singles
- 2020 Split Open

Final
- Champion: (Argentina) Francisco Cerúndolo
- Runner-up: (Portugal) Pedro Sousa
- Score: 4–6, 6–3, 7–6^{(7–4)}

Events
Singles	Doubles
- Split Open

This was the first edition of the tournament.

Francisco Cerúndolo won the title after defeating Pedro Sousa 4–6, 6–3, 7–6^{(7–4)} in the final.

== Seeds ==
1. (Portugal) Pedro Sousa (final)
2. (Slovakia) Jozef Kovalík (quarterfinals)
3. (United States) Bradley Klahn (second round, retired)
4. (Spain) Carlos Taberner (second round)
5. (Serbia) Danilo Petrović (first round)
6. (Slovakia) Martin Kližan (second round)
7. (Netherlands) Botic van de Zandschulp (second round)
8. (Japan) Tatsuma Ito (first round)

== Draw ==
Key

- Q = Qualifier
- WC = Wild card
- LL = Lucky loser
- Alt = Alternate
- ITF = ITF entry
- PR = Protected ranking
- SR = Special ranking
- SE = Special exempt
- JE = Junior exempt
- JR = Junior Accelerator Programme entrant
- CO = College Accelerator Programme entrant
- NG = Next Gen Accelerator Program entrant
- w/o = Walkover
- r = Retired
- d = Defaulted

=== Finals ===
Semifinals
1	(Portugal) Pedro Sousa	6	5	6
WC	(Croatia) Borna Gojo	4	7	2
(Argentina) Francisco Cerúndolo	6^{2}	6	6
WC	(Croatia) Duje Ajduković	7^{7}	4	3

Final
1	(Portugal) Pedro Sousa	6	3	6^{4}
(Argentina) Francisco Cerúndolo	4	6	7^{7}

=== Top half ===
First round
1	(Portugal) P Sousa	6	6
(France) H Grenier	4	4
(United States) M Krueger	2	3
(Czech Republic) Z Kolář	6	6
SE	(Argentina) TM Etcheverry	6	6
Q	(Turkey) A Çelikbilek	4	0
(Serbia) V Troicki	6	6
8	(Japan) T Ito	2	4
3	(United States) B Klahn	6^{8}	6	7^{7}
(Canada) P Polansky	7^{10}	4	6^{3}
WC	(Croatia) N Serdarušić	4	4
(Italy) A Giannessi	6	6
Q	(Chile) MT Barrios Vera	6	3	4
WC	(Croatia) B Gojo	4	6	6
Q	(Serbia) P Krstin	1	1
7	(Netherlands) B van de Zandschulp	6	6

Second round
1	(Portugal) P Sousa	6	3	6
(Czech Republic) Z Kolář	1	6	2
SE	(Argentina) TM Etcheverry	6	6
(Serbia) V Troicki	1	1
3	(United States) B Klahn	6^{7}	0^{r}
(Italy) A Giannessi	7^{9}	3
WC	(Croatia) B Gojo	7^{10}	2	6
7	(Netherlands) B van de Zandschulp	6^{8}	6	4

Quarterfinals
1	(Portugal) P Sousa	6	7^{9}
SE	(Argentina) TM Etcheverry	4	6^{7}
(Italy) A Giannessi	3	3
WC	(Croatia) B Gojo	6	6

Semifinals
1	(Portugal) P Sousa	6	5	6
WC	(Croatia) B Gojo	4	7	2

=== Bottom half ===
First round
5	(Serbia) D Petrović	5	6	6^{5}
(United States) B Nakashima	7	2	7^{7}
(United States) E Escobedo	7	6^{4}	3
(Argentina) F Cerúndolo	5	7^{7}	6
(Sweden) E Ymer	2	2
PR	(Germany) M Marterer	6	6
(Argentina) F Mena	1	3
4	(Spain) C Taberner	6	6
6	(Slovakia) M Kližan	4	6	6
(France) C Lestienne	6	3	4
(Brazil) J Menezes	4	6	3
WC	(Croatia) D Ajduković	6	3	6
(United States) U Blanch	6^{4}	4
(Portugal) F Ferreira Silva	7^{7}	6
Q	(Tunisia) M Jaziri	4	7^{7}	0
2	(Slovakia) J Kovalík	6	6^{0}	6

Second round
(United States) B Nakashima	3	1
(Argentina) F Cerúndolo	6	6
PR	(Germany) M Marterer	3	7	6
4	(Spain) C Taberner	6	5	4
6	(Slovakia) M Kližan	0	4
WC	(Croatia) D Ajduković	6	6
(Portugal) F Ferreira Silva	6	2	5
2	(Slovakia) J Kovalík	2	6	7

Quarterfinals
(Argentina) F Cerúndolo	7^{8}	3	7^{7}
PR	(Germany) M Marterer	6^{6}	6	6^{2}
WC	(Croatia) D Ajduković	6	6
2	(Slovakia) J Kovalík	2	4

Semifinals
(Argentina) F Cerúndolo	6^{2}	6	6
WC	(Croatia) D Ajduković	7^{7}	4	3
