= 2020 Split Open =

- Date: 28 September – 4 October 2020
- Edition: 1st
- Surface: Clay
- Location: Split, Croatia

Champions

Singles
- (Argentina) Francisco Cerúndolo

Doubles
- (Philippines) Treat Huey / (United States) Nathaniel Lammons
Split Open	· 2021 →

The 2020 Split Open was a professional tennis tournament played on clay courts. It was part of the 2020 ATP Challenger Tour. It took place in Split, Croatia between 28 September and 4 October 2020.

== Singles main-draw entrants ==
=== Seeds ===
Country	Player	Rank^{1}	Seed
POR	Pedro Sousa	113	1
SVK	Jozef Kovalík	124	2
USA	Bradley Klahn	134	3
ESP	Carlos Taberner	148	4
SRB	Danilo Petrović	159	5
SVK	Martin Kližan	162	6
NED	Botic van de Zandschulp	165	7
JPN	Tatsuma Ito	166	8

- Rankings are as of 21 September 2020.

=== Other entrants ===
The following players received wildcards into the singles main draw:

- (Croatia) Duje Ajduković
- (Croatia) Borna Gojo
- (Croatia) Nino Serdarušić

The following player received entry into the singles main draw as a special exempt:

- (Argentina) Tomás Martín Etcheverry

The following player received entry into the singles main draw using a protected ranking:

- (Germany) Maximilian Marterer

The following players received entry from the qualifying draw:

- (Chile) Marcelo Tomás Barrios Vera
- (Turkey) Altuğ Çelikbilek
- (Tunisia) Malek Jaziri
- (Serbia) Peđa Krstin

== Champions ==
=== Singles ===
- (Argentina) Francisco Cerúndolo def. (Portugal) Pedro Sousa 4–6, 6–3, 7–6^{(7–4)}.

=== Doubles ===
- (Philippines) Treat Huey / (United States) Nathaniel Lammons def. (Sweden) André Göransson / (United States) Hunter Reese 6–4, 7–6^{(7–3)}.
