= 2026 Split Open =

- Date: 23–29 March 2026
- Edition: 7th
- Category: ATP Challenger Tour
- Surface: Clay / Outdoor
- Location: Split, Croatia

Champions

Singles
- (Croatia) Mili Poljičak

Doubles
- (Slovakia) Miloš Karol / (Croatia) Mili Poljičak
- Split Open

The 2026 Split Open (Memorijal Mile Moralic - Split Open Jolly Autoline) was a professional tennis tournament played on outdoor clay courts. It was the seventh edition of the tournament which was part of the 2026 ATP Challenger Tour. It took place in Split, Croatia between 23 and 29 March 2026.

== Champions ==
=== Singles ===
- (Croatia) Mili Poljičak def. (Germany) Tom Gentzsch 6–4, 6–4.

=== Doubles ===
- (Slovakia) Miloš Karol / (Croatia) Mili Poljičak def. (Bosnia and Herzegovina) Mirza Bašić / (Bosnia and Herzegovina) Andrej Nedić 6–2, 6–2.

== Singles main-draw entrants ==
=== Seeds ===
Country	Player	Rank^{1}	Seed
CRO	Matej Dodig	214	1
GBR	George Loffhagen	222	2
AUT	Lukas Neumayer	227	3
BIH	Nerman Fatić	234	4
POR	Frederico Ferreira Silva	238	5
BEL	Kimmer Coppejans	244	6
GER	Tom Gentzsch	248	7
GBR	Felix Gill	252	8

- Rankings are as of 16 March 2026.

=== Other entrants ===
The following players received wildcards into the singles main draw:

- (Croatia) Emanuel Ivanišević
- (Croatia) Mili Poljičak
- (Croatia) Josip Šimundža

The following player received entry into the singles main draw through the Junior Accelerator programme:

- (Bulgaria) Alexander Vasilev

The following players received entry into the singles main draw as alternates:

- (Switzerland) ~~Kilian Feldbausch~~
- (United States) Christian Langmo

The following players received entry from the qualifying draw:

- (South Korea) Gerard Campaña Lee
- (Turkey) Ergi Kırkın
- (Ukraine) Oleksii Krutykh
- (Italy) Juan Cruz Martin Manzano
- (Germany) Adrian Oetzbach
- (Italy) Filippo Romano
