= Zsombor Piros =

Hungarian tennis player (born 1999)

- Piros at 2026 Wimbledon
- Country (sports): Hungary
- Residence: Budapest, Hungary
- Born: 13 October 1999 (age 27) Budapest, Hungary
- Height: 1.80 m (5 ft 11 in)
- Turned pro: 2016
- Plays: Right-handed (two-handed backhand)
- Coach: Attila Piros, Attila Balázs, Bence Tamas
- Prize money: US $1,271,959

Singles
- Career record: 13–10
- Career titles: 0
- Highest ranking: No. 96 (16 November 2026)
- Current ranking: No. 96 (16 November 2026)

Grand Slam singles results
- Australian Open: Q3 (2023)
- French Open: Q3 (2022)
- Wimbledon: Q3 (2022, 2023)
- US Open: 1R (2025, 2026)

Doubles
- Career record: 1–2
- Career titles: 0
- Highest ranking: No. 991 (8 August 2022)

Team competitions
- Davis Cup: 12–5
- Last updated on: 16 November 2026.

Zsombor Piros (born 13 October 1999) is a Hungarian professional tennis player. Piros has a career-high ATP singles ranking of world No. 96 achieved on 16 November 2026 and a doubles ranking of No. 991 achieved in August 2022. He is currently the No. 2 Hungarian player.

== Junior career ==
On the junior tour Piros had a career-high ranking of 3 achieved on 4 September 2017. Piros won the 2017 Australian Open boys' singles championships, defeating Israeli Yshai Oliel in the final. He also won the 2017 French Open – Boys' doubles title with Nicola Kuhn.

He made headlines at 2017 Wimbledon Championships when he and doubles partner Wu Yibing fell foul of Wimbledon's pants police, and were required to change their underpants from black to white to comply with regulations. Even without their lucky pants they won the subsequent match 6–4 6–1.

Piros won the Hungarian Tennis Championships on 1 October 2017.

== Professional career ==
=== 2018-2020: First Challenger and Top 100 win ===
Piros began his year at the Nouméa Challenger, where he came through qualifying to reach the 2nd round, losing to eventual champion Noah Rubin. In the first round, he defeated the top seed, Julien Benneteau of France, in three sets, 3–6, 7–5, 6–1, to record his first Challenger win as well as his first win against a Top 100 player. Next, he entered the Australian Open singles qualifying, falling to Bjorn Fratangelo of the United States in the second round.

=== 2021: First Challenger final, Top 300 ===
He reached his maiden Challenger final at the 2021 Slovak Open II as a qualifier and moved 58 positions up in the rankings to a new career-high ranking of No. 282 on 15 November 2021.

=== 2022: Top 200, Maiden Challenger title ===
He made his top 200 debut on 25 April 2022 at World No. 189 in the singles rankings following his second Challenger final at the 2022 Split Open in Croatia.

Following his maiden Challenger title at the 2022 Tampere Open he reached the top 150 at world No. 139 in the rankings on 25 July 2022. He won his second title at the 2022 Gwangju Open Challenger defeating Emilio Gómez. As a result, he reached a new career-high singles ranking of No. 138 on 10 October 2022.

=== 2023-2026: Grand Slam and Top 100 debuts ===
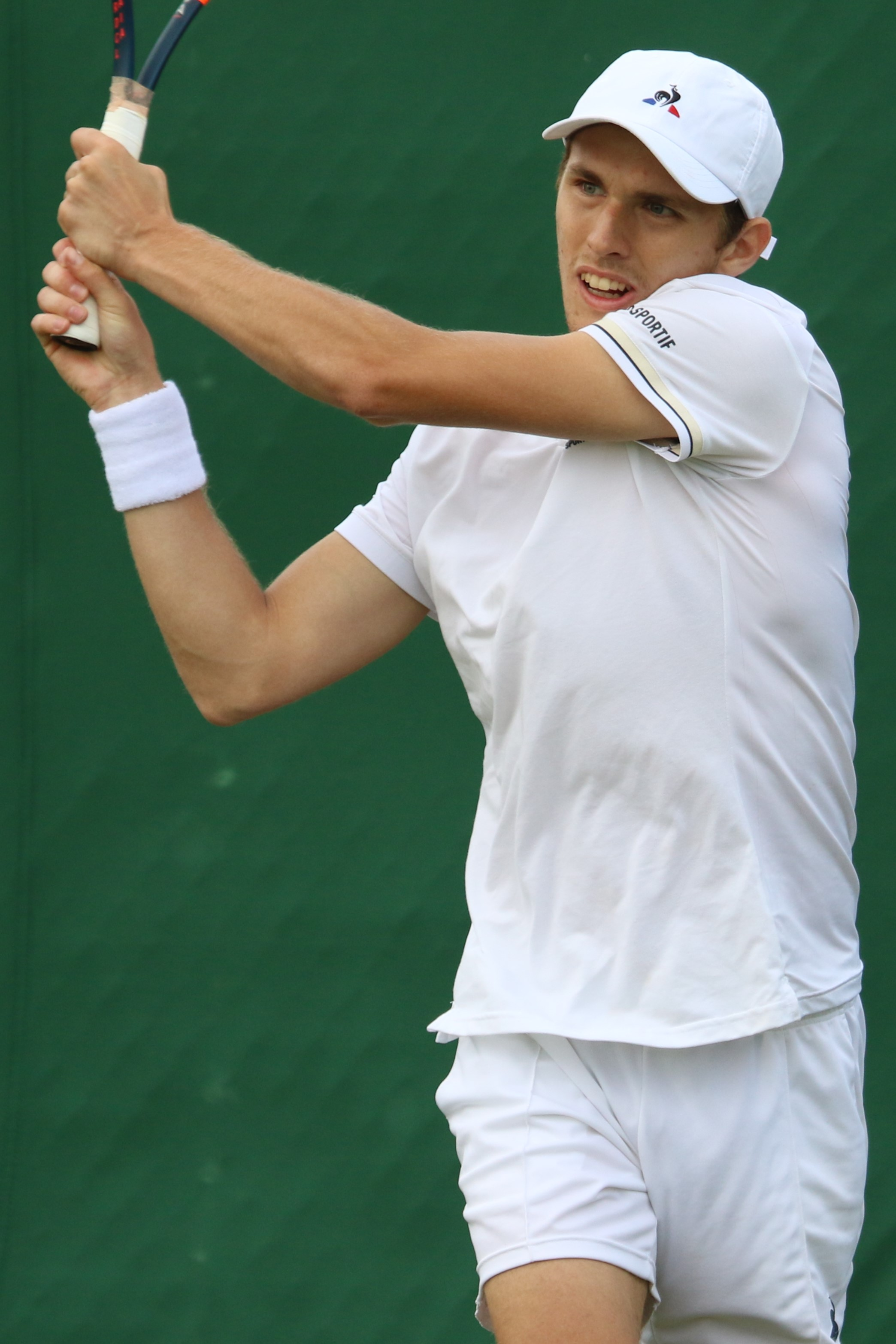
Piros at the 2023 Wimbledon Championships

Following his third Challenger title in Split he reached a new career high ranking of No. 134 on 17 April 2023. He won back-to-back titles in Oeiras and reached a new career-high ranking of No. 118 on 24 April 2023.

In May 2025, Piros won his seventh Challenger title in Tunis defeating Titouan Droguet. Piros qualified for his first Grand Slam main draw at the 2025 US Open.

Piros reached his seventh Challenger final of the 2026 season at the 2026 Maia Open but lost to Francesco Passaro 4–6, 6–3, 6–2 in the final. Despite the loss he reached a new career-high ranking of world No. 103 on 26 October 2026, surpassing his previous career-high of No. 106 reached in March 2024. Piros entered the top 100 for the first time at a new career-high ranking of No. 99 on 9 November 2026, following his quarterfinal appearance at the 2026 Slovak Open.

== National representation ==
Piros has represented Hungary at Davis Cup, where he has a win–loss record of 6–5, including a five-set victory over top 100 player Jiří Veselý.

== Performance timeline ==
Key
W	F	SF	QF	#R	RR	Q#	DNQ	A	NH

(W) winner; (F) finalist; (SF) semifinalist; (QF) quarterfinalist; (#R) rounds 4, 3, 2, 1; (RR) round-robin stage; (Q#) qualification round; (DNQ) did not qualify; (A) absent; (NH) not held; (SR) strike rate (events won / competed); (W–L) win–loss record.
To avoid confusion and double counting, these charts are updated at the conclusion of a tournament or when the player's participation has ended.

=== Singles ===
Tournament	2018	2019	2020	2021	2022	2023	2024	2025	2026	SR	W–L	Win %
Grand Slam tournaments
Australian Open	Q2	A	A	A	A	Q3	Q2	A	Q1	0 / 0	0–0	–
French Open	A	A	A	A	Q3	Q1	Q1	A	Q1	0 / 0	0–0	–
Wimbledon	A	A	NH	A	Q3	Q3	Q1	Q1	Q2	0 / 0	0–0	–
US Open	A	A	A	A	Q1	A	Q1	1R	1R	0 / 2	0–2	0%
Win–loss	0–0	0–0	0–0	0–0	0–0	0–0	0–0	0–1	0–1	0 / 2	0–2	0%
ATP Masters 1000
Indian Wells Masters	A	A	NH	A	A	A	A	A	A	0 / 0	0–0	–
Miami Open	A	A	NH	A	A	A	A	A	A	0 / 0	0–0	–
Monte Carlo Masters	A	A	NH	A	A	A	A	A	A	0 / 0	0–0	–
Madrid Open	A	A	NH	A	A	Q2	A	A	Q2	0 / 0	0-0	–
Italian Open	A	A	A	A	A	A	Q1	A	A	0 / 0	0–0	–
Canadian Open	A	A	NH	A	A	A	A	A		0 / 0	0–0	–
Cincinnati Masters	A	A	A	A	A	A	A	A		0 / 0	0–0	–
Shanghai Masters	A	A	NH			A	A	A		0 / 0	0–0	–
Paris Masters	A	A	A	A	A	A	A	A	A	0 / 0	0–0	–
Win–loss	0–0	0–0	0–0	0–0	0–0	0–0	0–0	0–0	0–0	0 / 0	0–0	–
Year-End Ranking					164	127	247	165	98			

== ATP Challenger and ITF Tour finals ==
=== Singles: 26 (16 titles, 10 runner-ups) ===
Legend ATP Challenger Tour (11–7) ITF Futures/WTT (5–3)	Finals by surface Hard (3–4) Clay (13–6)

Result	W–L	Date	Tournament	Tier	Surface	Opponent	Score
Loss	0–1	Aug 2017	Hungary F6, Budapest	Futures	Clay	(Spain) Enrique López Pérez	3–6, 0–6
Loss	0–2	Sep 2017	Hungary F7, Kecskemet	Futures	Clay	(Sweden) Markus Eriksson	6–4, 4–6, 3–6
Loss	0–3	Feb 2018	Egypt F5, Sharm El Sheikh	Futures	Hard	(France) Tom Jomby	2–6, 4–6
Win	1–3	Jun 2018	Hungary F5, Budapest	Futures	Clay	(Romania) Dragoș Dima	6–3, 6–2
Win	2–3	Feb 2020	M15 Antalya, Turkey	WTT	Clay	(Spain) Carlos Alcaraz	4–6, 6–4, 6–3
Win	3–3	Jul 2021	M15 Doboj, Bosnia and Herzegovina	WTT	Clay	(Hungary) Péter Fajta	6–3, 6–2
Win	4–3	Aug 2021	M25 Grodzisk Mazowiecki, Poland	WTT	Clay	(Japan) Shintaro Mochizuki	6–3, 7–6^{(7–3)}
Win	5–3	Sep 2021	M25 Ricany, Czech Republic	WTT	Clay	(Israel) Yshai Oliel	6–3, 3–6, 6–3
Loss	0–1	Nov 2021	Bratislava II, Slovakia	Challenger	Hard (i)	(Netherlands) Tallon Griekspoor	3–6, 2–6
Loss	0–2	Apr 2022	Split, Croatia	Challenger	Clay	(Australia) Christopher O'Connell	3–6, 0–2 ret.
Win	1–2	Jul 2022	Tampere, Finland	Challenger	Clay	(France) Harold Mayot	6–2, 1–6, 6–4
Win	2–2	Oct 2022	Gwangju, South Korea	Challenger	Hard	(Ecuador) Emilio Gómez	6–2, 6–4
Win	3–2	Apr 2023	Split, Croatia	Challenger	Clay	(Slovakia) Norbert Gombos	7–6^{(7–2)}, 7–6^{(11–9)}
Win	4–2	Apr 2023	Oeiras, Portugal	Challenger	Clay	(Argentina) Juan Manuel Cerúndolo	6–3, 6–4
Win	5–2	Feb 2024	Cherbourg, France	Challenger	Hard (i)	(France) Matteo Martineau	6–3, 6–4
Loss	5–3	Apr 2024	Split, Croatia	Challenger	Clay	(Slovakia) Jozef Kovalík	4–6, 7–5, 5–7
Loss	5–4	Jan 2025	Oeiras II, Portugal	Challenger	Hard (i)	(United States) Aleksandar Kovacevic	4–6, 6–7^{(4–7)}
Win	6–4	Apr 2025	Ostrava, Czech Republic	Challenger	Clay	(Lebanon) Hady Habib	6–3, 6–2
Win	7–4	May 2025	Tunis, Tunisia	Challenger	Clay	(France) Titouan Droguet	7–5, 7–6^{(7–3)}
Loss	7–5	Jan 2026	Oeiras, Portugal	Challenger	Hard (i)	(Luxembourg) Chris Rodesch	4–6, 6–4, 2–6
Win	8–5	Feb 2026	Lugano, Switzerland	Challenger	Hard (i)	(Austria) Joel Schwärzler	7-5, 4–6, 6–3
Win	9–5	Apr 2026	Madrid, Spain	Challenger	Clay	(Austria) Jurij Rodionov	7-5, 6–2
Loss	9–6	May 2026	Zagreb, Croatia	Challenger	Clay	(United Kingdom) Jan Choinski	6–7^{(5–7)}, 6–7^{(2–7)}
Win	10–6	Jun 2026	Brașov, Romania	Challenger	Clay	(United States) Keegan Smith	6–4, 6–4
Win	11–6	Jul 2026	Iași, Romania	Challenger	Clay	(France) Titouan Droguet	6–1, 7–6^{(7–2)}
Loss	11–7	Oct 2026	Maia, Portugal	Challenger	Clay (i)	(Italy) Francesco Passaro	6–4, 3–6, 2–6

== Davis Cup ==
=== Participations: (12–5) ===
Group membership World Group / Finals (3–1) Qualifying Round (4–3) WG Play-off (1–1) Group I (4–0) Group II (0–0) Group III (0–0) Group IV (0–0)	Matches by surface Hard (8–4) Clay (4–1) Grass (0–0) Carpet (0–0)	Matches by type Singles (11–4) Doubles (1–1)

- ▲ ▼ indicates the outcome of the Davis Cup match followed by the score, date, place of event, the zonal classification and its phase, and the court surface.

Rubber outcome	No.	Rubber	Match type (partner if any)	Opponent nation	Opponent player(s)	Score
▼2–3; 2–4 February 2018; Country Hall Liège, Liège, Belgium; World Group first round; hard (indoor) surface
Victory	1	V	Singles (dead rubber)	Belgium	Julien Cagnina	6–3, 7–6^{(7–3)}
▼2–3; 14–16 September 2018; Lurdy Ház, Budapest, Hungary; World Group play-off; clay surface
Victory	2	I	Singles	Czech Republic	Jiří Veselý	3–6, 6–4, 4–6, 7–6^{(7–3)}, 7–5
Defeat	3	V	Singles	Czech Republic	Lukáš Rosol	4–6, 6–7^{(6–8)}, 3–6
▼0–5; 1–2 February 2019; Fraport Arena, Frankfurt, Germany; Davis Cup qualifying round; hard (indoor) surface
Defeat	4	I	Singles	Germany	Philipp Kohlschreiber	7–6^{(8–6)}, 5–7, 4–6
▼1–2; 27 November 2021; Pala Alpitour, Turin, Italy; Davis Cup Final group stage; hard (indoor) surface
Victory	5	I	Singles	Australia	John Millman	4–6, 6–4, 6–3
Defeat	6	III	Doubles (with Fábián Marozsán)	Australia	Alex Bolt / John Peers	3–6, 7–6^{(13–11)}, 3–6
▼1–2; 28 November 2021; Pala Alpitour, Turin, Italy; Davis Cup Final Group D round robin; hard (indoor) surface
Victory	7	II	Singles	Croatia	Marin Čilić	4–6, 7–5, 6–4
▼2–3; 4-5 March 2022; Ken Rosewall Arena, Sydney, Australia; Davis Cup qualifying round; hard surface
Defeat	8	I	Singles	Australia	Alex de Minaur	5–7, 2–6
Defeat	9	V	Singles	Australia	Thanasi Kokkinakis	4–6, 4–6
▲3–1; 15–16 September 2022; SEB Arena, Vilnius, Lithuania; World Group I first round; hard (indoor) surface
Victory	10	II	Singles	Ukraine	Vladyslav Orlov	6–2, 6–2
▼2–3; 3–4 February 2023; Multifunctional Arena, Tatabánya, Hungary; Davis Cup qualifying round; hard (indoor) surface
Victory	11	I	Singles	France	Benjamin Bonzi	7–6^{(7–4)}, 6–3
▲4–0; 15–16 September 2023; Helikon Teniszcentrum, Keszthely, Hungary; World Group I first round; clay surface
Victory	12	II	Singles	Turkey	Cem İlkel	6–2, 6–3
▼2–3; 2–3 February 2024; Multifunctional Arena, Tatabánya, Hungary; Davis Cup qualifying round; hard (indoor) surface
Victory	13	V	Singles (dead rubber)	Germany	Kevin Krawietz	7–6^{(7–2)}, 6–3
▲3–2; 13–14 September 2024; Gezira Sporting Club, Cairo, Egypt; Davis Cup World Group I first round; clay surface
Victory	14	I	Singles	Egypt	Amr Elsayed	5–7, 6–3, 6–4
Victory	15	IV	Singles	Egypt	Mohamed Safwat	7–6^{(7–3)}, 6–1
▼2–3; 12–13 September 2025; Főnix Aréna, Debrecen, Hungary; Davis Cup Qualifiers second round; hard (indoor) surface
Victory	16	III	Doubles (with Fábián Marozsán)	Austria	Alexander Erler / Lucas Miedler	7–6^{(7–4)}, 7–6^{(7–2)}
Victory	17	IV	Singles	Austria	Lukas Neumayer	7–5, 7–6^{(8–6)}

== Junior Grand Slam finals ==
=== Singles: 1 (title) ===
Result	Year	Tournament	Surface	Opponent	Score
Win	2017	Australian Open	Hard	(Israel) Yshai Oliel	4–6, 6–4, 6–3

=== Doubles: 1 (title) ===
Result	Year	Tournament	Surface	Partner	Opponents	Score
Win	2017	French Open	Clay	(Spain) Nicola Kuhn	(United States) Vasil Kirkov (United States) Danny Thomas	6–4, 6–4
