= Jan Zieliński =

Polish tennis player (born 1996)

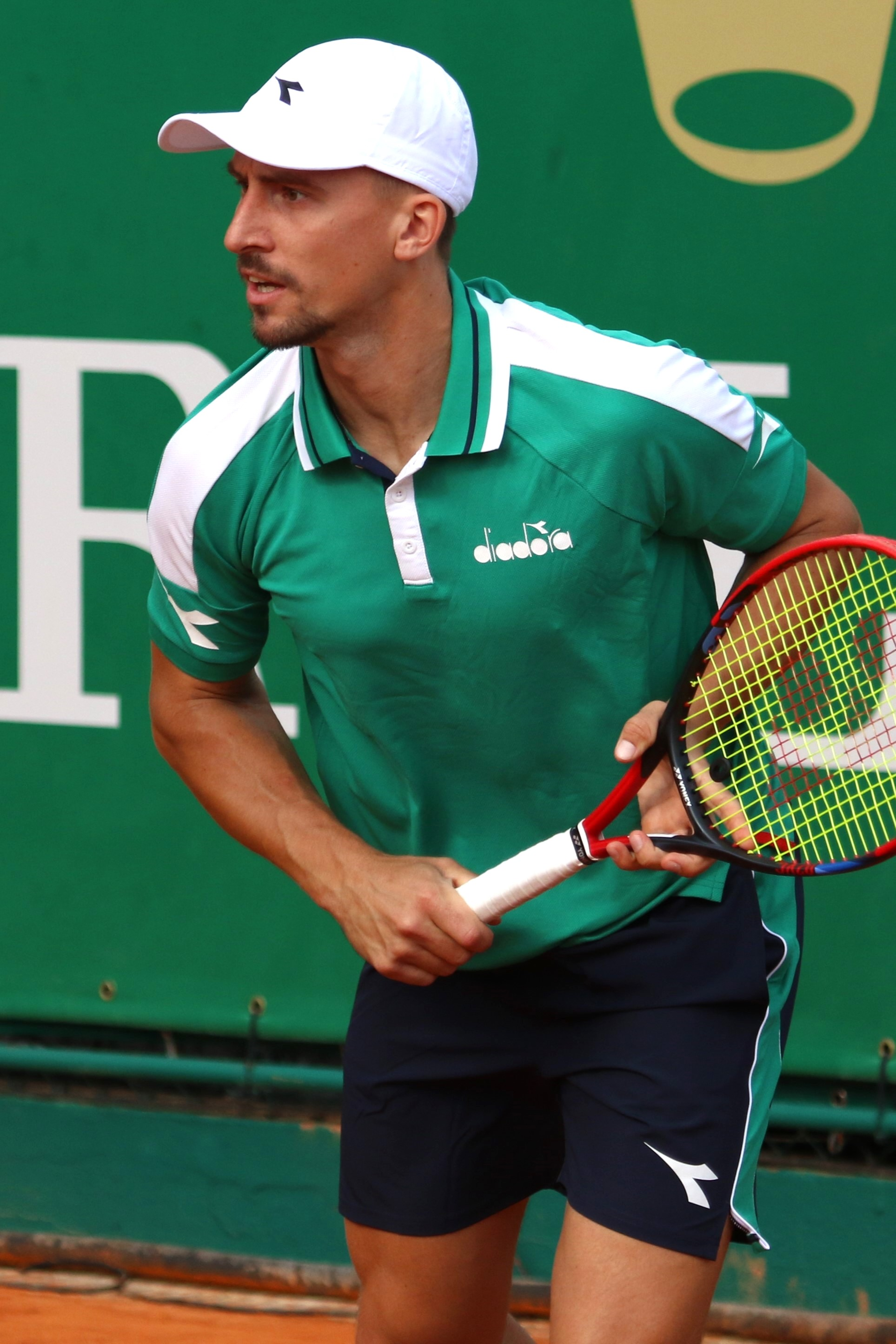
- Zieliński at the 2023 Monte-Carlo Masters
- Country (sports): Poland
- Residence: Warsaw, Poland
- Born: 16 November 1996 (age 29) Warsaw, Poland
- Height: 1.80 m (5 ft 11 in)
- Plays: Right-handed (two-handed backhand)
- College: University of Georgia
- Coach: Mariusz Fyrstenberg
- Prize money: US $1,862,101

Singles
- Career record: 0–2
- Highest ranking: No. 769 (20 September 2021)

Doubles
- Career record: 140–103
- Career titles: 6
- Highest ranking: No. 7 (19 June 2023)
- Current ranking: No. 33 (12 January 2026)

Grand Slam doubles results
- Australian Open: F (2023)
- French Open: 3R (2022, 2024)
- Wimbledon: 3R (2023, 2025)
- US Open: QF (2022, 2023)

Mixed doubles
- Career titles: 2

Grand Slam mixed doubles results
- Australian Open: W (2024)
- French Open: SF (2024)
- Wimbledon: W (2024)
- US Open: QF (2024)

Team competitions
- Davis Cup: 2–0
- Last updated on: 26 January 2026.

Jan Zieliński (Polish: [ˈjan ʑɛˈliɲskʲi]; born 16 November 1996) is a Polish professional tennis player who specializes in doubles. He has an ATP career-high doubles ranking of world No. 7, which he attained on 19 June 2023. His highest ranking in singles has been No. 769, achieved on 20 September 2021. His best results at Grand Slam events are winning the 2024 Australian Open and the 2024 Wimbledon Championships in mixed doubles with partner Hsieh Su-wei. He also reached the final of the 2023 Australian Open doubles with Hugo Nys.

== Professional career ==
=== 2021: First ATP doubles title and top 100 debut ===
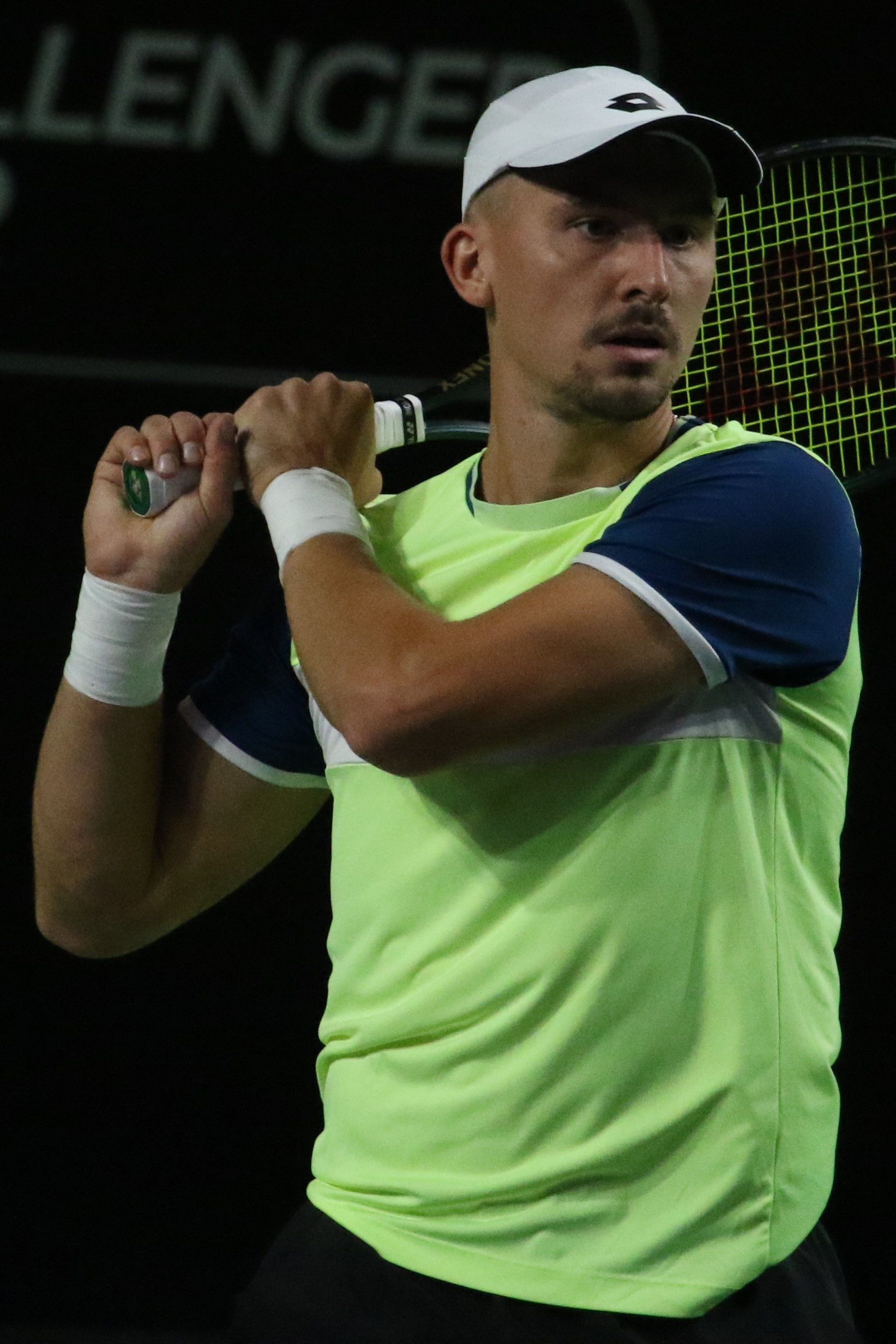
Jan Zieliński at the 2021 Internationaux de Tennis de Vendée

Zieliński made his top 100 doubles debut at No. 99 on 1 November 2021 after winning his first ATP Tour doubles title at the 2021 Moselle Open with his compatriot Hubert Hurkacz.

=== 2022: First Major quarterfinal, second ATP title and top 35 ===
In January 2022, he made his debut participating as part of the Polish team at the 2022 ATP Cup, where he played doubles with Szymon Walków and won against Georgia and Argentina. After Hurkacz's win over Diego Schwartzman sealed the victory for Poland over Argentina, the Polish team advanced to the semifinals. The pair won again against Spain in doubles, but the team did not advance to the finals.

He reached the top 50 in doubles at world No. 49 on 18 July 2022. In August, at his debut at a Masters 1000 level, he reached his first semifinal at the 2022 National Bank Open also with Hurkacz, defeating sixth seeds Puetz/Venus in the first round, Bopanna/Middelkoop in the second and fourth seeds, and French Open champions Arévalo/Rogers in the quarterfinals.

At the US Open, he reached the quarterfinals of a Grand Slam for the first time in his career with partner Hugo Nys, defeating 10th seeded pair Jamie Murray/Bruno Soares and Ariel Behar/Gonzalo Escobar. As a result, he made his top 40 debut in the rankings. The pair won their first title at the 2022 Moselle Open.

=== 2023: Major final and Masters doubles title, World No. 7 ===
At the 2023 Australian Open, he achieved his career best Grand Slam result by advancing to the semifinals with partner Hugo Nys. The pair defeated Rafael Matos/David Vega Hernández, Max Purcell/Jordan Thompson, second seeds Rajeev Ram/Joe Salisbury and Benjamin Bonzi/Arthur Rinderknech in the quarterfinals. The pair beat the French duo of Jérémy Chardy/Fabrice Martin in the semifinals to advance to their first Grand Slam final, where they lost to Australians Rinky Hijikata and Jason Kubler.

Following their first Masters 1000 title in Rome, Zielinski reached a career high ranking of No. 12 on 22 May 2023. Following the 2023 French Open, he made his debut in the top 10 in the rankings at world No. 9 on 12 June 2023.

At the 2023 Moselle Open in Metz the Monegasque/Polish pair defended their crown but came short of qualifying for the year-end 2023 ATP Finals, finishing ninth in the ATP race.

=== 2024: First Polish mixed doubles champion in Australia and at Wimbledon ===
At the 2024 Australian Open he reached the quarterfinals with Nys but they lost to the unseeded pair Dominik Koepfer and Yannick Hanfmann and could not defend their runner-up points from the previous year. Despite the loss in the doubles event, seeded third, he reached the final in the mixed doubles partnering Hsieh Su-wei, and they won their first Major mixed doubles title, defeating second seeds Desirae Krawczyk and Neal Skupski. They saved a championship point en route to Zieliński's first Grand Slam title and Hsieh's seventh, and first on hardcourts. Zieliński became the first Polish finalist and champion at a mixed doubles event.

At the 2024 Abierto Mexicano Telcel in Acapulco he won his first ATP 500 title with Nys defeating top pair of Santiago Gonzalez and Neal Skupski.

He reached the mixed doubles semifinals at the 2024 French Open with Hsieh Su-wei where they lost to Krawczyk and Skupski. At the next Grand Slam, the 2024 Wimbledon Championships, he reached another final in mixed doubles with the same partner, Hsieh Su-wei. They won the title defeating Mexican duo Giuliana Olmos and Santiago González in the final.

=== 2025-2026: United Cup Champion ===
Zieliński entered the 2025 United Cup representing Team Poland. With his team, he advanced to the final where Team Poland were defeated by Team United States.

In the final of the 2026 United Cup team Poland defeated team Switzerland to finally lift the title.

== College career ==
Zieliński attended and played collegiate tennis at the University of Georgia.

== Doubles performance timeline ==
Key
W	F	SF	QF	#R	RR	Q#	P#	DNQ	A	Z#	PO	G	S	B	NMS	NTI	P	NH

(W) winner; (F) finalist; (SF) semifinalist; (QF) quarterfinalist; (#R) rounds 4, 3, 2, 1; (RR) round-robin stage; (Q#) qualification round; (P#) preliminary round; (DNQ) did not qualify; (A) absent; (Z#) Davis/Fed Cup Zonal Group (with number indication) or (PO) play-off; (G) gold, (S) silver or (B) bronze Olympic/Paralympic medal; (NMS) not a Masters tournament; (NTI) not a Tier I tournament; (P) postponed; (NH) not held; (SR) strike rate (events won / competed); (W–L) win–loss record.
To avoid confusion and double counting, these charts are updated at the conclusion of a tournament or when the player's participation has ended.

=== Men's doubles ===
Tournament	2021	2022	2023	2024	2025	2026	SR	W–L
Grand Slam tournaments
Australian Open	A	1R	F	QF	3R		0 / 4	10–4
French Open	A	3R	2R	3R	1R		0 / 4	5–4
Wimbledon	A	2R	3R	1R	3R		0 / 4	5–4
US Open	A	QF	QF	2R	3R		0 / 4	9–4
Win–loss	0–0	6–4	11–4	6–4	6–4		0 / 16	29–16
ATP Masters Series
Indian Wells Masters	A	A	1R	1R	1R		0 / 3	0–3
Miami Open	A	A	1R	2R	2R		0 / 3	2–3
Monte-Carlo Masters	A	A	1R	1R	1R		0 / 3	0–3
Madrid Open	A	A	2R	QF	QF		0 / 3	5–3
Italian Open	A	A	W	2R	2R		1 / 3	7–2
Canadian Open	A	SF	1R	SF	2R		0 / 4	6–4
Cincinnati Open	A	A	1R	2R	1R		0 / 3	1–3
Shanghai Open	NH	A	1R	1R	2R		0 / 3	1–3
Paris Masters	A	1R	1R	2R	1R		0 / 4	1–4
Win–loss	0–0	3–2	6–8	9–9	6–9		1 / 29	23–28
Career Statistics
Titles	1	1	2	1	0		5	
Finals	2	3	4	2	4		15	
Year-end ranking	96	34	20	25	35		$1,862,101	

=== Mixed doubles ===
Tournament	2023	2024	2025	SR	W–L
Australian Open	1R	W	2R	1 / 3	6–2
French Open	1R	SF	A	0 / 2	3–2
Wimbledon	1R	W	QF	1 / 3	7–2
US Open	1R	QF	A	0 / 2	2–2

== Grand Slam finals ==
=== Doubles: 1 (1 runner-up) ===
Result	Year	Championship	Surface	Partner	Opponents	Score
Loss	2023	Australian Open	Hard	(Monaco) Hugo Nys	(Australia) Rinky Hijikata (Australia) Jason Kubler	4–6, 6–7^{(4–7)}

=== Mixed Doubles: 2 (2 titles) ===
Result	Year	Championship	Surface	Partner	Opponents	Score
Win	2024	Australian Open	Hard	(Chinese Taipei) Hsieh Su-wei	(United States) Desirae Krawczyk (United Kingdom) Neal Skupski	6–7^{(5–7)}, 6–4, [11–9]
Win	2024	Wimbledon	Grass	(Chinese Taipei) Hsieh Su-wei	(Mexico) Giuliana Olmos (Mexico) Santiago González	6–4, 6–2

== ATP Tour finals ==
=== Doubles: 16 (6 titles, 10 runner-ups) ===
Legend Grand Slam (0–1) ATP Finals (0–0) ATP Masters 1000 (1–0) ATP 500 (1–4) ATP 250 (4–5)	Finals by surface Hard (5–6) Clay (1–4) Grass (0–0)	Finals by setting Outdoor (3–6) Indoor (3–4)

Result	W–L	Date	Tournament	Tier	Surface	Partner	Opponents	Score
Loss	0–1	Jul 2021	Swiss Open Gstaad, Switzerland	ATP 250	Clay	(Poland) Szymon Walków	(Switzerland) Marc-Andrea Hüsler (Switzerland) Dominic Stricker	1–6, 6–7^{(7–9)}
Win	1–1	Sep 2021	Moselle Open, France	ATP 250	Hard (i)	(Poland) Hubert Hurkacz	(Monaco) Hugo Nys (France) Arthur Rinderknech	7–5, 6–3
Loss	1–2	Apr 2022	Grand Prix Hassan II, Morocco	ATP 250	Clay	(Italy) Andrea Vavassori	(Brazil) Rafael Matos (Spain) David Vega Hernández	1–6, 5–7
Loss	1–3	Aug 2022	Winston-Salem Open, United States	ATP 250	Hard	(Monaco) Hugo Nys	(Australia) Matthew Ebden (United Kingdom) Jamie Murray	4–6, 2–6
Win	2–3	Sep 2022	Moselle Open, France (2)	ATP 250	Hard (i)	(Monaco) Hugo Nys	(United Kingdom) Lloyd Glasspool (Finland) Harri Heliövaara	7–6^{(7–5)}, 6–4
Loss	2–4	Jan 2023	Australian Open, Australia	Grand Slam	Hard	(Monaco) Hugo Nys	(Australia) Rinky Hijikata (Australia) Jason Kubler	4–6, 6–7^{(4–7)}
Win	3–4	May 2023	Rome Masters, Italy	Masters 1000	Clay	(Monaco) Hugo Nys	(Netherlands) Robin Haase (Netherlands) Botic van de Zandschulp	7–5, 6–1
Loss	3–5	Oct 2023	Swiss Indoors, Switzerland	ATP 500	Hard (i)	(Monaco) Hugo Nys	(Mexico) Santiago González (France) Édouard Roger-Vasselin	7–6^{(10–8)}, 6–7^{(3–7)}, [1–10]
Win	4–5	Nov 2023	Moselle Open, France (3)	ATP 250	Hard (i)	(Monaco) Hugo Nys	(Germany) Constantin Frantzen (Germany) Hendrik Jebens	6–4, 6–4
Win	5–5	Mar 2024	Mexican Open, Mexico	ATP 500	Hard	(Monaco) Hugo Nys	(Mexico) Santiago González (United Kingdom) Neal Skupski	6–3, 6–2
Loss	5–6	Apr 2024	Barcelona Open, Spain	ATP 500	Clay	(Monaco) Hugo Nys	(Argentina) Máximo González (Argentina) Andrés Molteni	6–4, 4–6, [9–11]
Loss	5–7	Feb 2025	Rotterdam Open, Netherlands	ATP 500	Hard (i)	(Belgium) Sander Gillé	(Italy) Simone Bolelli (Italy) Andrea Vavassori	2–6, 6–4, [6–10]
Loss	5–8	Feb 2025	Open 13, France	ATP 250	Hard (i)	(Belgium) Sander Gillé	(France) Benjamin Bonzi (France) Pierre-Hugues Herbert	3–6, 4–6
Loss	5–9	Jul 2025	Swedish Open, Sweden	ATP 250	Clay	(Czech Republic) Adam Pavlásek	(Argentina) Guido Andreozzi (Netherlands) Sander Arends	7–6^{(7–4)}, 5–7, [6–10]
Loss	5–10	Oct 2025	Swiss Indoors, Switzerland	ATP 500	Hard (i)	(Czech Republic) Adam Pavlásek	(Spain) Marcel Granollers (Argentina) Horacio Zeballos	2–6, 5–7
Win	6–10	Sep 2026	Chengdu Open, China	ATP 250	Hard	(United Kingdom) Luke Johnson	(United States) Robert Galloway (Sweden) André Göransson	7–5, 7–6^{(9–7)}

== ATP Challenger and ITF Futures/World Tennis Tour finals ==
=== Singles: 1 (1 runner-up) ===
Legend ATP Challenger Tour (0–0) ITF WTT (0–1)

Result	W–L	Date	Tournament	Tier	Surface	Opponent	Score
Loss	0–1	Nov 2019	M15 Heraklion, Greece	WTT	Hard	(Austria) Alexander Erler	5–7, 1–6

=== Doubles: 31 (19 titles, 12 runner-ups) ===
Legend ATP Challenger Tour (5–6) ITF Futures/WTT (14–6)	Finals by surface Hard (7–6) Clay (11–6) Grass (0–0) Carpet (1–0)

Result	W–L	Date	Tournament	Tier	Surface	Partner	Opponents	Score
Loss	0–1	Oct 2014	Egypt F29, Sharm El Sheikh	Futures	Hard	(Czech Republic) Libor Salaba	(Netherlands) Matwé Middelkoop (Egypt) Mohamed Safwat	6–7^{(1–7)}, 3–6
Loss	0–2	Jun 2015	Georgia F5, Pantiani	Futures	Clay	(Poland) Karol Drzewiecki	(Italy) Marco Bortolotti (Italy) Francesco Moncagatto	3–6, 2–6
Win	1–2	Aug 2015	Poland F3, Poznań	Futures	Clay	(Poland) Adam Majchrowicz	(Sweden) Markus Eriksson (Sweden) Daniel Windahl	6–0, 5–7, [10–2]
Loss	1–3	Jul 2016	Lithuania F1, Vilnius	Futures	Clay	(Poland) Michał Dembek	(Lithuania) Laurynas Grigelis (Lithuania) Lukas Mugevicius	5–7, 4–6
Win	2–3	Jul 2016	Estonia F1, Parnu	Futures	Clay	(Poland) Michał Dembek	(Russia) Vladimir Polyakov (Russia) Evgenii Tiurnev	7–5, 7–5
Win	3–3	Aug 2018	Poland F3, Koszalin	Futures	Clay	(Poland) Kacper Żuk	(Poland) Paweł Ciaś (Poland) Michał Dembek	6–2, 6–2
Win	4–3	Jul 2019	M15 Wrocław, Poland	WTT	Clay	(Poland) Kacper Żuk	(Poland) Jan Galka (Poland) Piotr Galus	6–4, 6–3
Win	5–3	Sep 2019	M15 Antalya, Turkey	WTT	Clay	(Poland) Kacper Żuk	(India) Adil Kalyanpur (Canada) Kelsey Stevenson	3–6, 6–1, [10–8]
Loss	5–4	Sep 2019	M25 Stockholm, Sweden	WTT	Hard	(Poland) Kacper Żuk	(Sweden) Filip Bergevi (France) Florian Lakat	3–6, 6–7^{(3–7)}
Win	6–4	Oct 2019	M25 Falun, Sweden	WTT	Hard	(France) Florian Lakat	(Latvia) Janis Podzus (Latvia) Martins Podzus	7–6^{(7–5)}, 6–1
Win	7–4	Oct 2019	M15 Sharm El Sheikh, Egypt	WTT	Hard	(United Kingdom) Julian Cash	(Poland) Piotr Matuszewski (Poland) Daniel Michalski	7–6^{(7–2)}, 7–6^{(7–3)}
Win	8–4	Oct 2019	M15 Sharm El Sheikh, Egypt	WTT	Hard	(Poland) Kacper Żuk	(Spain) Pablo Vivero González (Chinese Taipei) Ching-Mou Yu	6–3, 6–1
Win	9–4	Nov 2019	M15 Heraklion, Greece	WTT	Hard	(United Kingdom) Luke Johnson	(Switzerland) Adrian Bodmer (Austria) Jonas Trinker	1–6, 6–2, [12–10]
Loss	9–5	Nov 2019	M15 Heraklion, Greece	WTT	Hard	(United Kingdom) Luke Johnson	(Austria) Alexander Erler (Austria) Neil Oberleitner	4–6, 0–6
Win	10–5	Jan 2020	M25 Nussloch, Germany	WTT	Carpet	(Poland) Kacper Żuk	(Germany) Johannes Haerteis (Germany) Peter Heller	6–3, 6–4
Win	11–5	Feb 2020	M25 Barnstaple, United Kingdom	WTT	Hard	(Poland) Kacper Żuk	(United Kingdom) Evan Hoyt (United Kingdom) Luke Johnson	6–3, 7–6^{(7–5)}
Win	12–5	Feb 2020	M25 Glasgow, United Kingdom	WTT	Hard	(Poland) Szymon Walków	(Sweden) Simon Freund (United Kingdom) Evan Hoyt	6–1, 6–1
Win	13–5	Feb 2020	M25 Sunderland, United Kingdom	WTT	Hard	(Poland) Szymon Walków	(Netherlands) Jesper de Jong (Netherlands) Bart Stevens	6–4, 6–4
Win	14–5	Aug 2020	M25 Poznań, Poland	WTT	Clay	(Poland) Kacper Żuk	(Poland) Mikolaj Lorens (Poland) Wojciech Marek	7–5, 6–2
Loss	14–6	Sep 2020	M25 Prague, Czech Republic	WTT	Clay	(Austria) Lucas Miedler	(Argentina) Sebastián Báez (Argentina) Pedro Cachín	6–7^{(4–7)}, 1–6
Win	1–0	Sep 2020	Sibiu, Romania	Challenger	Clay	(United States) Hunter Reese	(United States) Robert Galloway (Mexico) Hans Hach	6–4, 6–2
Loss	1–1	Feb 2021	Biella, Italy	Challenger	Hard	(Poland) Szymon Walków	(Venezuela) Luis David Martínez (Spain) David Vega Hernández	3–6, 6–3, [8–10]
Loss	1–2	Apr 2021	Split, Croatia	Challenger	Clay	(Poland) Szymon Walków	(Kazakhstan) Andrey Golubev (Kazakhstan) Aleksandr Nedovyesov	5–7, 7–6^{(7–5)}, [5–10]
Win	2–2	Apr 2021	Split II, Croatia	Challenger	Clay	(Poland) Szymon Walków	(France) Grégoire Barrère (France) Albano Olivetti	6–2, 7–5
Win	3–2	Jul 2021	Braunschweig, Germany	Challenger	Clay	(Poland) Szymon Walków	(Croatia) Ivan Sabanov (Croatia) Matej Sabanov	6–4, 4–6, [10–4]
Win	4–2	Aug 2021	Meerbusch, Germany	Challenger	Clay	(Poland) Szymon Walków	(Germany) Dustin Brown (Netherlands) Robin Haase	6–3, 6–1
Loss	4–3	Aug 2021	Manacor, Spain	Challenger	Hard	(Brazil) Fernando Romboli	(Poland) Karol Drzewiecki (Spain) Sergio Martos Gornés	4–6, 6–4, [3–10]
Win	5–3	Mar 2022	Roseto degli Abruzzi, Italy	Challenger	Clay	(Monaco) Hugo Nys	(Czech Republic) Roman Jebavý (Austria) Philipp Oswald	7–6^{(7–2)}, 4–6, [10–3]
Loss	5–4	Mar 2022	Marbella, Spain	Challenger	Clay	(Monaco) Hugo Nys	(Czech Republic) Roman Jebavý (Austria) Philipp Oswald	6–7^{(6–8)}, 6–3, [3–10]
Loss	5–5	May 2022	Bordeaux, France	Challenger	Clay	(Monaco) Hugo Nys	(Brazil) Rafael Matos (Spain) David Vega Hernández	4-6, 0-6
Loss	5–6	Mar 2023	Phoenix, USA	Challenger	Hard	(Monaco) Hugo Nys	(United States) Nathaniel Lammons (United States) Jackson Withrow	7–6^{(7–1)}, 4–6, [8–10]
