= Kacper Żuk =

Polish tennis player

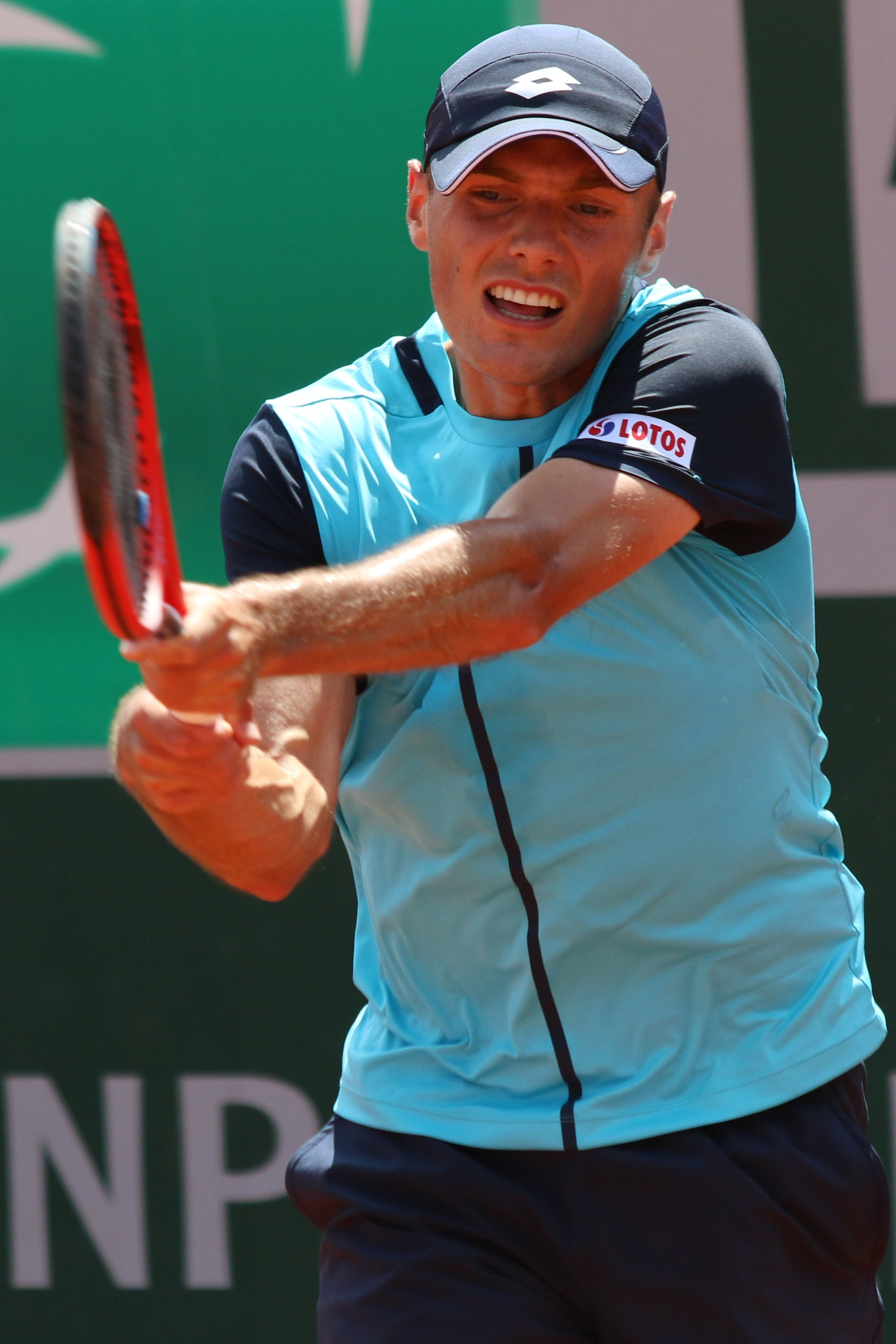
- Żuk at the 2022 French Open
- Country (sports): Poland
- Residence: Nowy Dwór Mazowiecki, Poland
- Born: 21 January 1999 (age 27) Nowy Dwór Mazowiecki, Poland
- Height: 1.83 m (6 ft 0 in)
- Turned pro: 2016
- Plays: Right-handed (two-handed backhand)
- Coach: Jerzy Janowicz, Arthur Zuk
- Prize money: US $368,326

Singles
- Career record: 3–7
- Career titles: 0
- Highest ranking: No. 162 (13 September 2021)

Grand Slam singles results
- Australian Open: Q1 (2022)
- French Open: Q1 (2021, 2022)
- Wimbledon: Q2 (2021)
- US Open: Q2 (2021)

Doubles
- Career record: 0–0
- Career titles: 0
- Highest ranking: No. 278 (9 May 2022)
- Current ranking: No. 1,592 (9 November 2026)
- Last updated on: 9 November 2026.

Kacper Żuk (born 21 January 1999) is a former Polish professional tennis player. He has a career high ATP singles ranking of world No. 162 achieved on 13 September 2021 and a career-high ATP doubles ranking of world No. 278 achieved on 9 May 2022.

Żuk has reached ten career singles finals with a record of 11 wins and 3 losses, which includes a 1–2 record in ATP Challenger Tour finals. Additionally, he has reached 21 career doubles finals, with a record of 12 wins and 9 losses all but one occurring at the ITF Futures level.

== Tennis career ==
=== 2020–21: First Challenger title and top 200 ===
Żuk made his ATP debut at the 2020 ATP Cup, where he represented Poland in a singles match, losing to Marin Čilić of team Croatia.

He ended the 2020 season with back-to-back ITF World Tennis Tour titles at Hamburg and Vale do Lobo.

He reached his first Challenger final in March 2021 and in April won his first Challenger title at the 2021 Split Open II in Croatia. As a result, he reached the top 200 on 19 April 2021 and a career-high of No. 162 on 13 September 2021.

=== 2022–23: United Cup debut ===
He played his first match at the 2023 United Cup as the Polish No. 3 male player in the semifinals against Frances Tiafoe and lost in straight sets.

== Grand Slam performance timeline ==
Key
W	F	SF	QF	#R	RR	Q#	P#	DNQ	A	Z#	PO	G	S	B	NMS	NTI	P	NH

(W) winner; (F) finalist; (SF) semifinalist; (QF) quarterfinalist; (#R) rounds 4, 3, 2, 1; (RR) round-robin stage; (Q#) qualification round; (P#) preliminary round; (DNQ) did not qualify; (A) absent; (Z#) Davis/Fed Cup Zonal Group (with number indication) or (PO) play-off; (G) gold, (S) silver or (B) bronze Olympic/Paralympic medal; (NMS) not a Masters tournament; (NTI) not a Tier I tournament; (P) postponed; (NH) not held; (SR) strike rate (events won / competed); (W–L) win–loss record.
To avoid confusion and double counting, these charts are updated at the conclusion of a tournament or when the player's participation has ended.

Current through the 2023 US Open qualifying

=== Singles ===
Tournament	2021	2022	2023	SR	W–L	Win %
Australian Open	A	Q1	A	0 / 0	0–0	–
French Open	Q1	Q1	A	0 / 0	0–0	–
Wimbledon	Q2	Q1	A	0 / 0	0–0	–
US Open	Q2	A	A	0 / 0	0–0	–
Win–loss	0–0	0 / 0	0–0	–		

== ATP Challenger and ITF Futures Finals ==
=== Singles: 15 (12 titles, 3 runner-ups) ===
Legend (singles) ATP Challenger Tour (1–2) ITF World Tennis Tour (11–1)	Finals by surface Hard (8–3) Clay (3–0) Grass (0–0) Carpet (1–0)

Result	W–L	Date	Tournament	Tier	Surface	Opponent	Score
Win	1–0	Mar 2019	M15 Sharm El Sheikh, Egypt	World Tennis Tour	Hard	(Spain) Pablo Vivero Gonzalez	7–6^{(7–2)}, 6–3
Win	2–0	May 2019	M15 Troisdorf, Germany	World Tennis Tour	Clay	(Belgium) Jeroen Vanneste	7–5, 6–1
Win	3–0	Sep 2019	M25 Stockholm, Sweden	World Tennis Tour	Hard (i)	(Netherlands) Botic van de Zandschulp	4–6, 6–4, 6–3
Loss	3–1	Oct 2019	M15 Sharm El Sheikh, Egypt	World Tennis Tour	Hard	(Spain) Pablo Vivero Gonzalez	4–6, 6–4, 5–7
Win	4–1	Feb 2020	M25 Barnstaple, Great Britain	World Tennis Tour	Hard (i)	(Belgium) Christopher Heyman	7–6^{(7–3)}, 6–3
Win	5–1	Aug 2020	M25 Poznań, Poland	World Tennis Tour	Clay	(Bulgaria) Dimitar Kuzmanov	7–6^{(8–6)}, 6–1
Win	6–1	Oct 2020	M25 Hamburg, Germany	World Tennis Tour	Hard (i)	(Chinese Taipei) Tseng Chun-hsin	6–4, 7–6^{(7–4)}
Win	7–1	Oct 2020	M25 Vale do Lobo, Portugal	World Tennis Tour	Hard	(Portugal) Nuno Borges	6–4, 6–3
Loss	7–2	Mar 2021	Saint Petersburg, Russia	Challenger	Hard (i)	(Russia) Evgenii Tiurnev	4–6, 2–6
Win	8–2	Apr 2021	Split, Croatia	Challenger	Clay	(France) Mathias Bourgue	6–4, 6–2
Loss	8–3	Mar 2022	Biel/Bienne, Switzerland	Challenger	Hard (i)	(Austria) Jurij Rodionov	6–7^{(3–7)}, 4–6
Win	9–3	Aug 2022	M25 Tbilisi, Georgia	World Tennis Tour	Hard	(Georgia (country)) Aleksandre Metreveli	6–2, 6–4
Win	10–3	Sep 2022	M25 Falun, Sweden	World Tennis Tour	Hard (i)	(Sweden) Karl Friberg	6–3, 6–3
Win	11–3	Nov 2022	M25 Sharm El Sheikh, Egypt	World Tennis Tour	Hard	(United Kingdom) Alastair Gray	6–4, 6–4
Win	12–3	Mar 2023	M25 Trimbach, Switzerland	World Tennis Tour	Carpet (i)	(Kazakhstan) Beibit Zhukayev	6–4, 6–4

=== Doubles: 21 (12 titles, 10 runner-ups) ===
Legend (singles) ATP Challenger Tour (0–2) ITF World Tennis Tour (12–8)	Finals by surface Hard (5–9) Clay (6–1) Grass (0–0) Carpet (1–0)

Result	W–L	Date	Tournament	Tier	Surface	Partner	Opponents	Score
Win	1–0	Jun 2016	Poland F3, Sopot	Futures	Clay	(Poland) Piotr Matuszewski	(Poland) Andriej Kapaś (Poland) Adam Majchrowicz	7–6^{(7–5)}, 6–3
Win	2–0	Oct 2016	Egypt F27, Sharm El Sheikh	Futures	Hard	(Poland) Piotr Matuszewski	(Italy) Antonio Massara (Italy) Andrea Vavassori	6–3, 6–2
Win	3–0	Nov 2016	Egypt F34, Sharm El Sheikh	Futures	Hard	(Poland) Piotr Matuszewski	(Poland) Szymon Walków (Poland) Kamil Gajewski	3–6, 6–2, [10–7]
Loss	3–1	Apr 2017	Egypt F11, Sharm El Sheikh	Futures	Hard	(Poland) Piotr Matuszewski	(Netherlands) Gijs Brouwer (Netherlands) Jelle Sels	5–7, 1–6
Win	4–1	Oct 2017	Egypt F27, Sharm El Sheikh	Futures	Hard	(Poland) Piotr Matuszewski	(Czech Republic) Tomas Papik (Czech Republic) Marek Gengel	6–2, 6–2
Win	5–1	Aug 2018	Poland F6, Koszalin	Futures	Clay	(Poland) Jan Zieliński	(Poland) Pawel Cias (Poland) Michal Dembek	6–2, 6–2
Win	6–1	Sep 2018	Netherlands F6, Haren	Futures	Clay	(Poland) Yann Wojcik	(Netherlands) Stephan Gerritsen (Netherlands) Maikel Borg	4–6, 6–4, [10–3]
Loss	6–2	Oct 2018	Egypt F21, Sharm El Sheikh	Futures	Hard	(Switzerland) Adam Moundir	(Italy) Marco Brugnerotto (Spain) David Pérez Sanz	6–3, 2–6, [7–10]
Loss	6–3	Nov 2018	Egypt F28, Sharm El Sheikh	Futures	Hard	(Egypt) Adham Gaber	(Venezuela) Jordi Muñoz Abreu (Spain) David Pérez Sanz	3–6, 2–6
Loss	6–4	Jan 2019	M15 Sharm El Sheikh, Egypt	World Tennis Tour	Hard	(Czech Republic) David Poljak	(Chinese Taipei) Hsu Yu Hsiou (Japan) Shintaro Imai	2–6, 0–6
Loss	6–5	Mar 2019	M15 Sharm El Sheikh, Egypt	World Tennis Tour	Hard	(Poland) Daniel Michalski	(Ukraine) Marat Deviatiarov (Switzerland) Jakub Paul	3–6, 4–6
Loss	6–6	Jun 2019	M15 Tabarka, Tunisia	World Tennis Tour	Clay	(Poland) Daniel Michalski	(United Kingdom) Barnaby Smith (United Kingdom) Toby Martin	7–5, 1–6, [8–10]
Win	7–6	Jul 2019	M15 Wrocław, Poland	World Tennis Tour	Clay	(Poland) Jan Zieliński	(Poland) Piotr Galus (Poland) Jan Galka	6–4, 6–3
Win	8–6	Sep 2019	M15 Antalya, Turkey	World Tennis Tour	Clay	(Poland) Jan Zieliński	(India) Adil Kalyanpur (Canada) Kelsey Stevenson	3–6, 6–1, [10–8]
Loss	8–7	Sep 2019	M25 Stockholm, Sweden	World Tennis Tour	Hard	(Poland) Jan Zieliński	(Sweden) Filip Bergevi (France) Florian Lakat	3–6, 6–7^{(3–7)}
Win	9–7	Nov 2019	M15 Sharm El Sheikh, Egypt	World Tennis Tour	Hard	(Poland) Jan Zieliński	(Spain) P Vivero Gonzalez (Chinese Taipei) Yu Cheng-Yu	6–3, 6–1
Loss	9–8	Nov 2019	M15 Sharm El Sheikh, Egypt	World Tennis Tour	Hard	(Poland) Piotr Matuszewski	(Kazakhstan) Sagadat Ayap (Germany) Kai Lemstra	1–6, 6–7^{(2–7)}
Win	10–8	Jan 2020	M25 Nussloch, Germany	World Tennis Tour	Carpet	(Poland) Jan Zieliński	(Germany) Johannes Härteis (Germany) Peter Heller	6–3, 6–4
Win	11–8	Feb 2020	M25 Barnstaple, Great Britain	World Tennis Tour	Hard	(Poland) Jan Zieliński	(United Kingdom) Evan Hoyt (United Kingdom) Luke Johnson	6–3, 7–6^{(7–5)}
Win	12–8	Aug 2020	M25 Poznań, Poland	World Tennis Tour	Clay	(Poland) Jan Zieliński	(Poland) Mikolaj Lorens (Poland) Wojciech Marek	7–5, 6–2
Loss	12–9	Feb 2022	Pau, France	Challenger	Hard (i)	(Poland) Karol Drzewiecki	(France) Albano Olivetti (Spain) David Vega Hernández	w/o
Loss	12–10	Feb 2023	Cherbourg, France	Challenger	Hard (i)	(Poland) Karol Drzewiecki	Ivan Liutarevich (Ukraine) Vladyslav Manafov	6–7^{(10–12)}, 6–7^{(7–9)}
