= Mili Poljičak =

Croatian tennis player

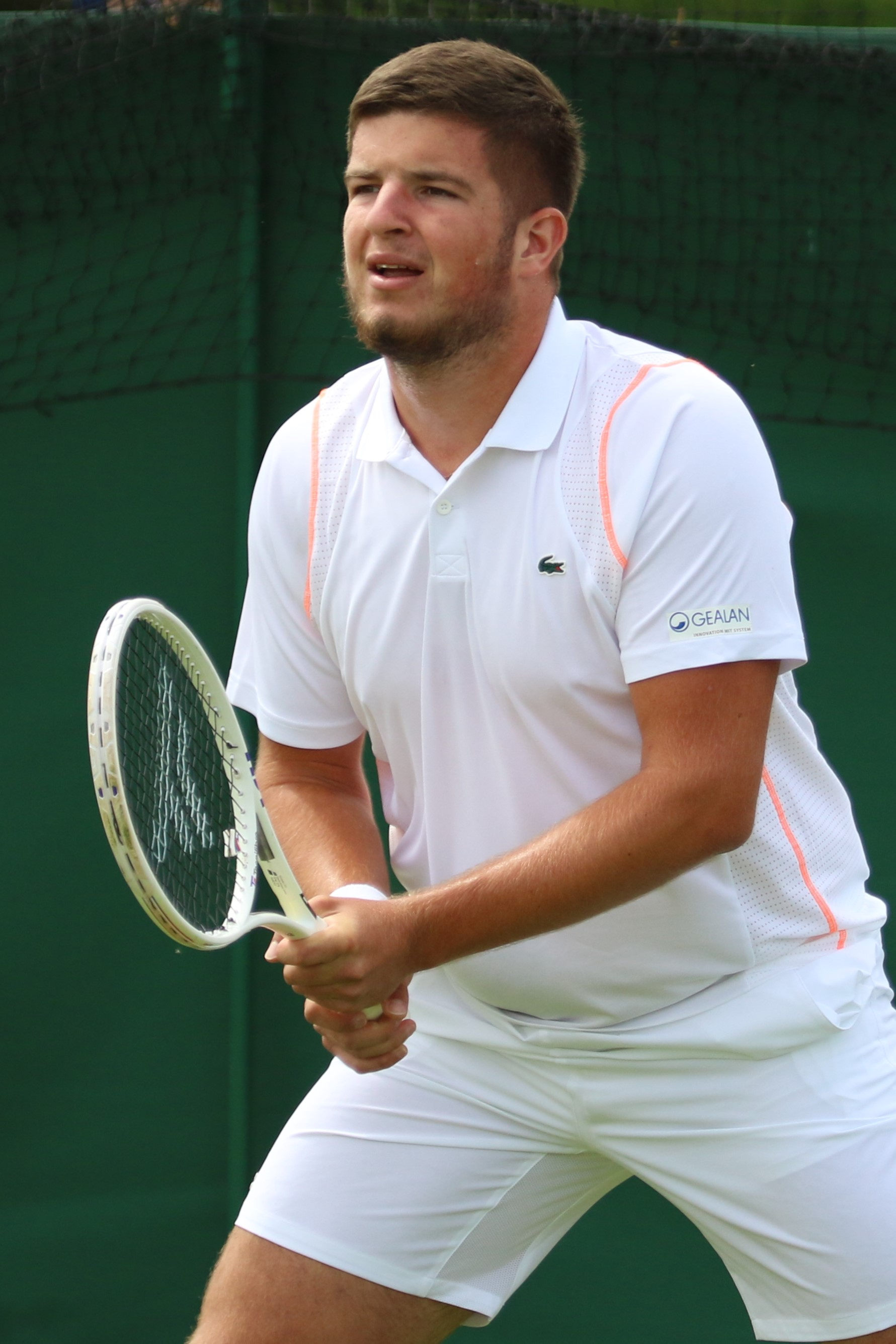
- Poljičak at the 2023 Wimbledon Championships
- Country (sports): Croatia
- Born: 13 July 2004 (age 22) Split, Croatia
- Height: 1.85 m (6 ft 1 in)
- Plays: Right-handed (two-handed backhand)
- Coach: Marin Bradarić, Ante Poljicak
- Prize money: US $265,370

Singles
- Career record: 0–3 (at ATP Tour level, Grand Slam level, and in Davis Cup)
- Career titles: 0
- Highest ranking: No. 257 (30 June 2025)
- Current ranking: No. 279 (16 November 2026)

Grand Slam singles results
- Wimbledon: Q1 (2023)

Doubles
- Career record: 2–4 (at ATP Tour level, Grand Slam level, and in Davis Cup)
- Career titles: 0
- Highest ranking: No. 138 (9 November 2026)
- Current ranking: No. 138 (9 November 2026)

Team competitions
- Davis Cup: 1–0
- Last updated on: 16 November 2026.

Mili Poljičak (born 13 July 2004) is a Croatian professional tennis player. He has a career-high ATP singles ranking of world No. 257 achieved on 30 June 2025 and a doubles ranking of No. 138 achieved on 9 November 2026.

== Career ==
Poljičak made his ATP main draw debut at the 2021 Croatia Open Umag after receiving a wildcard into the doubles main draw. Partnering with Admir Kalender, the pair defeated second seeds Pablo Cuevas and Fabrice Martin in the first round in straight sets but lost in the next round to eventual champions Fernando Romboli and David Vega Hernández in three sets.

At the 2022 Zagreb Open he reached his maiden Challenger final as a wildcard where he lost to Filip Misolic. At the same tournament also as a wildcard he reached the semifinals in doubles partnering Antonio Šančić. As a result, he reached the top 550 at World No. 549 (up 923 positions) in the singles rankings and the top 375 in doubles (up 88 positions) on 16 May 2022.

At 18 years of age, having won the boys' singles the previous year, he received a wildcard for the qualifying draw of the 2023 Wimbledon Championships to make his Grand Slam qualifying debut.

He reached a new career high ranking of No. 409 on 26 August 2024, following back-to-back ITF titles in Maribor on clay.

== ATP Challenger Tour finals ==
=== Singles: 4 (1 title, 3 runner-ups) ===
Legend ATP Challenger Tour (1–3)

Result	W–L	Date	Tournament	Tier	Surface	Opponent	Score
Loss	0–1	May 2022	Zagreb, Croatia	Challenger	Clay	(Austria) Filip Misolic	3–6, 6–7^{(6–8)}
Loss	0–2	Sep 2025	Târgu Mureș, Romania	Challenger	Clay	(Argentina) Marco Trungelliti	1–6, 0–0 ret.
Win	1–2	Mar 2026	Split, Croatia	Challenger	Clay	(Germany) Tom Gentzsch	6–4, 6–4
Loss	1–3	Jul 2026	City of San Marino, San Marino	Challenger	Clay	(Argentina) Facundo Díaz Acosta	1–6, 4–6

=== Doubles: 8 (7 titles, 1 runner-up) ===
Legend ATP Challenger Tour (7–1)

Result	W–L	Date	Tournament	Tier	Surface	Partner	Opponents	Score
Win	1–0	Jan 2025	Oeiras, Portugal	Challenger	Hard (i)	(Serbia) Matej Sabanov	(Spain) Íñigo Cervantes (Netherlands) Mick Veldheer	6–0, 6–1
Loss	1–1	May 2025	Zagreb, Croatia	Challenger	Clay	(Croatia) Luka Mikrut	(Croatia) Matej Dodig (Croatia) Nino Serdarušić	4–6, 4–6
Win	2–1	Sep 2025	Târgu Mureș, Romania	Challenger	Clay	(Austria) Neil Oberleitner	(Romania) Alexandru Cristian Dumitru (Romania) Dan Alexandru Tomescu	6–0, 6–3
Win	3–1	Mar 2026	Split, Croatia	Challenger	Clay	(Slovakia) Miloš Karol	(Bosnia and Herzegovina) Mirza Bašić (Bosnia and Herzegovina) Andrej Nedić	6–2, 6–2
Win	4–1	Apr 2026	Shymkent, Kazakhstan	Challenger	Clay	(Croatia) Admir Kalender	(Norway) Viktor Durasovic (Germany) Kai Wehnelt	6–2, 6–7^{(7–9)}, [10–5]
Win	5–1	Jul 2026	City of San Marino, San Marino	Challenger	Clay	(Serbia) Stefan Latinović	(France) Arthur Reymond (France) Luca Sanchez	7–6^{(7–5)}, 6–3
Win	6–1	Sep 2026	Genoa, Italy	Challenger	Clay	(Serbia) Stefan Latinović	(Croatia) Admir Kalender (Croatia) Nino Serdarušić	7–6^{(7–1)}, 6–7^{(3–7)}, [10–6]
Win	7–1	Sep 2026	Porto, Portugal	Challenger	Hard	(Serbia) Stefan Latinović	(Bulgaria) Alexander Donski (Poland) Filip Pieczonka	6–3, 6–4

== ITF World Tennis Tour finals ==
=== Singles: 10 (6 titles, 4 runner-ups) ===
Legend ITF WTT (6–4)	Finals by surface Hard (2–1) Clay (4–3)

Result	W–L	Date	Tournament	Tier	Surface	Opponent	Score
Win	1–0	Nov 2022	M15 Monastir, Tunisia	WTT	Hard	(France) Robin Bertrand	6–1, 2–6, 6–4
Loss	1–1	Apr 2024	M15 Osijek, Croatia	WTT	Clay	(Ukraine) Viacheslav Bielinskyi	2–6, 0–6
Loss	1–2	May 2024	M15 Doboj, Bosnia and Herzegovina	WTT	Clay	(France) Lilian Marmousez	6–7^{(2–7)}, 4–6
Win	2–2	Jun 2024	M15 Monastir, Tunisia	WTT	Hard	(Switzerland) Patrick Schön	7–5, 6–1
Loss	2–3	Jul 2024	M15 Monastir, Tunisia	WTT	Hard	Ilia Simakin	7–6^{(7–4)}, 1–6, 3–6
Win	3–3	Jul 2024	M15 Umag, Croatia	WTT	Clay	(Croatia) Nikola Bašić	7–5, 7–6^{(7–3)}
Win	4–3	Aug 2024	M25 Maribor, Slovenia	WTT	Clay	(Slovenia) Filip Jeff Planinšek	6–4, 6–2
Win	5–3	Aug 2024	M25 Maribor, Slovenia	WTT	Clay	(Ukraine) Oleksandr Ovcharenko	7–5, 7–6^{(8–6)}
Loss	5–4	Sep 2024	M25 Zlatibor, Serbia	WTT	Clay	(France) Mathys Erhard	6–7^{(4–7)}, 1–6
Win	6–4	Mar 2026	M15 Poreč, Croatia	WTT	Clay	(Italy) Tommaso Compagnucci	6–3, 6–4

=== Doubles: 18 (14 titles, 4 runner-ups) ===
Legend ITF WTT (14–4)	Finals by surface Hard (5–0) Clay (9–4)

Result	W–L	Date	Tournament	Tier	Surface	Partner	Opponents	Score
Win	0–1	Apr 2021	M15 Šibenik, Croatia	WTT	Clay	(Croatia) Borna Devald	(Croatia) Zvonimir Babić (Austria) David Pichler	3–6, 4–6
Win	1–1	Apr 2022	M25 Split, Croatia	WTT	Clay	(Croatia) Luka Mikrut	(France) Théo Arribagé (France) Luca Sanchez	2–6, 6–4, [10–8]
Loss	1–1	May 2022	M25 Ulcinj, Montenegro	WTT	Clay	(Serbia) Stefan Popović	(Romania) Cezar Crețu (Israel) Daniel Cukierman	4–6, 1–6
Loss	1–2	May 2022	M25 Osijek, Croatia	WTT	Clay	(Croatia) Luka Mikrut	(India) Dev Javia (Slovakia) Lukáš Pokorný	6–7^{(3–7)}, 6–3, [8–10]
Loss	1–3	Aug 2022	M25 Maribor, Slovenia	WTT	Clay	(Croatia) Antonio Šančić	(Croatia) Domagoj Bilješko; Kirill Kivattsev	3–6, 7–6^{(7–0)}, [9–11]
Win	2–3	Oct 2022	M25 Sunderland, United Kingdom	WTT	Hard (i)	(United Kingdom) Arthur Fery	(United Kingdom) Giles Hussey (United Kingdom) Johannus Monday	6–3, 6–4
Win	3–3	Jul 2023	M25 Klosters, Switzerland	WTT	Clay	(Switzerland) Damien Wenger	(Germany) Patrick Zahraj (Germany) Leopold Zima	6–2, 6–4
Win	4–3	Sep 2023	M25 Maribor, Slovenia	WTT	Clay	(Croatia) Luka Mikrut	(Croatia) Nikola Bašić (Slovenia) Jan Kupčič	6–7^{(5–7)}, 6–1, [10–6]
Win	5–3	Jan 2024	M15 Monastir, Tunisia	WTT	Hard	(France) Constantin Bittoun Kouzmine	(Germany) Nicola Kuhn (Spain) David Pérez Sanz	6–1, 0–6, [10–8]
Win	6–3	Feb 2024	M15 Oberhaching, Germany	WTT	Hard (i)	(Germany) Daniel Masur	(Italy) Giovanni Oradini (Czech Republic) Matěj Vocel	5–7, 6–3, [10–8]
Loss	6–4	Mar 2024	M15 Poreč, Croatia	WTT	Clay	(Croatia) Nikola Bašić	(Croatia) Alen Bill (Croatia) Luka Mikrut	1–6, 5–7
Win	7–4	Mar 2024	M15 Rovinj, Croatia	WTT	Clay	(Croatia) Luka Mikrut	(Italy) Leonardo Rossi (Italy) Luigi Sorrentino	6–7^{(5–7)}, 7–5, [10–7]
Win	8–4	Mar 2024	M15 Opatija, Croatia	WTT	Clay	(Croatia) Luka Mikrut	(Italy) Tommaso Compagnucci (Italy) Luigi Sorrentino	6–4, 6–2
Win	9–4	May 2024	M15 Doboj, Bosnia and Herzegovina	WTT	Clay	(Croatia) Marino Jakić	(Japan) Koki Matsuda (Japan) Yamato Sueoka	6–3, 6–4
Win	10–4	May 2024	M15 Bol, Croatia	WTT	Clay	(Croatia) Josip Šimundža	(Argentina) Nikos Lehmann (Switzerland) Nicolás Parizzia	6–1, 6–2
Win	11–4	Feb 2025	M25 Vila Real de Santo António, Portugal	WTT	Hard	(Serbia) Stefan Latinović	Ivan Gakhov (Uzbekistan) Sergey Fomin	6–4, 4–6, [10–6]
Win	12–4	Mar 2025	M15 Poreč, Croatia	WTT	Clay	(Croatia) Emanuel Ivanišević	(Croatia) Karlo Kajin (Croatia) Deni Žmak	6–3, 3–6, [10–5]
Win	13–4	Feb 2026	M15 Sharm El Sheikh, Egypt	WTT	Hard	(United States) Billy Suarez	(Ukraine) Aleksandr Braynin (Ukraine) Georgii Kravchenko	7–6^{(8–6)}, 6–4
Win	14–4	May 2026	M25 Bol, Croatia	WTT	Clay	(Croatia) Admir Kalender	(Greece) Dimitris Sakellaridis (Greece) Michalis Sakellaridis	6–4, 6–3

== Junior Grand Slam finals ==
=== Singles: 1 (1 title) ===
Result	Year	Tournament	Surface	Opponent	Score
Win	2022	Wimbledon	Grass	(United States) Michael Zheng	7–6^{(7–2)}, 7–6^{(7–3)}

=== Doubles: 1 (1 title) ===
Result	Year	Tournament	Surface	Partner	Opponents	Score
Win	2022	French Open	Clay	(Lithuania) Edas Butvilas	(Peru) Gonzalo Bueno (Peru) Ignacio Buse	6–4, 6–0
