= Split Open =

- 2024 Split Open

Tournament information
- Event name: Split Open
- Founded: 1997
- Location: Split, Croatia
- Venue: TC Firule
- Surface: Clay
ATP Tour
- Category: ATP Challenger Tour
- Draw: 32S/17Q/16D
- Prize money: €74,825
WTA Tour
- Category: ITF Women's World Tennis Tour
- Draw: 32S/32Q/16D
- Prize money: $60,000

The Split Open is a professional tennis tournament played on outdoor clay courts. It is currently part of the ATP Challenger Tour and the ITF Women's World Tennis Tour. It is held annually in Split, Croatia since 2020.

== Past finals ==
=== Men's singles ===
Year	Tier	Champion	Runner-up	Score
2026	50	(Croatia) Mili Poljičak	(Germany) Tom Gentzsch	6–4, 6–4
2025	not held			
2024	75	(Slovakia) Jozef Kovalík	(Hungary) Zsombor Piros	6–4, 5–7, 7–5
2023	75	(Hungary) Zsombor Piros	(Slovakia) Norbert Gombos	7–6^{(7–2)}, 7–6^{(11–9)}
2022	80	(Australia) Christopher O'Connell	(Hungary) Zsombor Piros	6–3, 2–0 ret.
2021 (2)	80	(Poland) Kacper Żuk	(France) Mathias Bourgue	6–4, 6–2
2021 (1)	80	(Slovenia) Blaž Rola	(Slovenia) Blaž Kavčič	2–6, 6–3, 6–2
2020	80	(Argentina) Francisco Cerúndolo	(Portugal) Pedro Sousa	4–6, 6–3, 7–6^{(7–4)}
2019- 1999	not held			
1998	$100K+H	(Bulgaria) Orlin Stanoytchev	(Hungary) Attila Sávolt	7–6, 6–4
1997	$50K+H	(Romania) Dinu-Mihai Pescariu	(Costa Rica) Juan Antonio Marín	3–6, 6–2, 6–1

=== Men's doubles ===
Year	Champions	Runners-up	Score
2026	(Slovakia) Miloš Karol (Croatia) Mili Poljičak	(Bosnia and Herzegovina) Mirza Bašić (Bosnia and Herzegovina) Andrej Nedić	6–2, 6–2
2025	not held		
2024	(France) Jonathan Eysseric (Netherlands) Bart Stevens	(Sweden) Filip Bergevi (Netherlands) Mick Veldheer	0–6, 6–4, [10–8]
2023	(France) Sadio Doumbia (France) Fabien Reboul	(India) Anirudh Chandrasekar (India) Vijay Sundar Prashanth	6–4, 6–4
2022	(United States) Nathaniel Lammons (France) Albano Olivetti	(France) Sadio Doumbia (France) Fabien Reboul	4–6, 7–6^{(8–6)}, [10–7]
2021 (2)	(Poland) Szymon Walków (Poland) Jan Zieliński	(France) Grégoire Barrère (France) Albano Olivetti	6–2, 7–5
2021 (1)	(Kazakhstan) Andrey Golubev (Kazakhstan) Aleksandr Nedovyesov	(Poland) Szymon Walków (Poland) Jan Zieliński	7–5, 6–7^{(5–7)}, [10–5]
2020	(Philippines) Treat Huey (United States) Nathaniel Lammons	(Sweden) André Göransson (United States) Hunter Reese	6–4, 7–6^{(7–3)}
2019- 1999	not held		
1998	(United States) Geoff Grant (Hungary) Attila Sávolt	(Spain) Álex López Morón (Spain) Alberto Martín	4–6, 6–3, 6–2
1997	(United States) Devin Bowen (Romania) Dinu-Mihai Pescariu	(United States) Trey Phillips (Mexico) David Roditi	7–6, 6–3

=== Women's singles ===
Year	Champion	Runner-up	Score
2024	(Croatia) Jana Fett	(Turkey) İpek Öz	6–0, 6–4
2023	(Croatia) Tara Würth	(Czech Republic) Sára Bejlek	6–2, 3–6, 6–4
2022	(Finland) Anastasia Kulikova	(Japan) Yuki Naito	7–6^{(7–4)}, 6–1

=== Women's doubles ===
Year	Champions	Runners-up	Score
2024	(Greece) Valentini Grammatikopoulou (India) Prarthana Thombare	(Slovenia) Veronika Erjavec (Lithuania) Justina Mikulskytė	6–4, 6–1
2023	(Slovenia) Veronika Erjavec (North Macedonia) Lina Gjorcheska	(Slovenia) Nika Radišić (Croatia) Tara Würth	6–1, 6–4
2022	(Croatia) Lea Bošković (Slovenia) Veronika Erjavec	(Japan) Mana Kawamura (Japan) Funa Kozaki	4–6, 6–1, [10–2]
