= 2024 Zagreb Open – Men's doubles =

Men's doubles
- 2024 Zagreb Open

Final
- Champions: (France) Jonathan Eysseric (France) Quentin Halys
- Runners-up: (Romania) Alexandru Jecan (Portugal) Henrique Rocha
- Score: 6–4, 6–4

Events
Singles	men	women
Doubles	men	women
← 2022 ·	Zagreb Open	· 2025 →

Adam Pavlásek and Igor Zelenay were the defending champions but chose not to defend their title.

Jonathan Eysseric and Quentin Halys won the title after defeating Alexandru Jecan and Henrique Rocha 6–4, 6–4 in the final.

== Seeds ==
1. (Chinese Taipei) Ray Ho / (Australia) Calum Puttergill (first round)
2. (Serbia) Ivan Sabanov / (Serbia) Matej Sabanov (semifinals)
3. (Sweden) Simon Freund / (Denmark) Johannes Ingildsen (quarterfinals)
4. (Spain) Íñigo Cervantes / (Spain) Oriol Roca Batalla (first round)

== Draw ==
=== Key ===
- Q = Qualifier
- WC = Wild card
- LL = Lucky loser
- Alt = Alternate
- SE = Special exempt
- PR = Protected ranking
- ITF = ITF entry
- JE = Junior exempt
- w/o = Walkover
- r = Retired
- d = Defaulted
- SR = Special ranking

=== Draw ===
First round
1	(Chinese Taipei) R Ho (Australia) C Puttergill	3	3
(Romania) A Jecan (Portugal) H Rocha	6	6
(Israel) D Cukierman (Austria) D Pichler	6	6
WC	(Croatia) Vito Horvat (Croatia) Emanuel Ivanišević	2	3
4	(Spain) Í Cervantes (Spain) O Roca Batalla	4	7^{7}	[6]
(Brazil) Gabriel Roveri Sidney (New Zealand) R Statham	6	6^{2}	[10]
(Croatia) Z Babić (United States) N Moreno de Alboran	6^{4}	3
(United Kingdom) S Duncan (United States) H Reese	7^{7}	6
(France) J Eysseric (France) Q Halys	2	6	[12]
(United States) G Goldhoff (Poland) S Walków	6	4	[10]
(France) E Couacaud (Argentina) R Olivo	6	3	[9]
3	(Sweden) S Freund (Denmark) J Ingildsen	4	6	[11]
PR	(Spain) D Rincón (Netherlands) M Vervoort	w/o
Alt	(Bulgaria) A Andreev (Kazakhstan) D Popko
WC	(Croatia) M Dodig (Croatia) L Mikrut	3	3
2	(Serbia) I Sabanov (Serbia) M Sabanov	6	6

Quarterfinals
(Romania) A Jecan (Portugal) H Rocha	7	6
(Israel) D Cukierman (Austria) D Pichler	5	4
(Brazil) G Roveri Sidney (New Zealand) R Statham	6^{10}	6	[5]
(United Kingdom) S Duncan (United States) H Reese	7^{12}	4	[10]
(France) J Eysseric (France) Q Halys	6	6
3	(Sweden) S Freund (Denmark) J Ingildsen	2	0
PR	(Spain) D Rincón (Netherlands) M Vervoort	6	2	[8]
2	(Serbia) I Sabanov (Serbia) M Sabanov	2	6	[10]

Semifinals
(Romania) A Jecan (Portugal) H Rocha	3	6	[10]
(United Kingdom) S Duncan (United States) H Reese	6	2	[3]
(France) J Eysseric (France) Q Halys	7^{7}	7^{7}
2	(Serbia) I Sabanov (Serbia) M Sabanov	6^{1}	6^{4}

Final
(Romania) A Jecan (Portugal) H Rocha	4	4
(France) J Eysseric (France) Q Halys	6	6
