= 2021 Zagreb Open – Doubles =

Doubles
- 2021 Zagreb Open

Final
- Champions: (United States) Evan King (United States) Hunter Reese
- Runners-up: (Kazakhstan) Andrey Golubev (Kazakhstan) Aleksandr Nedovyesov
- Score: 6–2, 7–6^{(7–4)}

Events
Singles	Doubles
← 2011 ·	Zagreb Open	· 2022 →

This was the first edition of the tournament since 2011.

Evan King and Hunter Reese won the title after defeating Andrey Golubev and Aleksandr Nedovyesov 6–2, 7–6^{(7–4)} in the final.

== Seeds ==
1. (Kazakhstan) Andrey Golubev / (Kazakhstan) Aleksandr Nedovyesov (final)
2. (Monaco) Romain Arneodo / (France) Albano Olivetti (semifinals)
3. (United States) Evan King / (United States) Hunter Reese (champions)
4. (France) Sadio Doumbia / (France) Fabien Reboul (withdrew)

== Draw ==
=== Key ===
- Q = Qualifier
- WC = Wild card
- LL = Lucky loser
- Alt = Alternate
- SE = Special exempt
- PR = Protected ranking
- ITF = ITF entry
- JE = Junior exempt
- w/o = Walkover
- r = Retired
- d = Defaulted
- SR = Special ranking

First round
1	(Kazakhstan) A Golubev (Kazakhstan) A Nedovyesov	6	2	[10]
(Argentina) S Báez (Brazil) T Seyboth Wild	1	6	[0]
(Kazakhstan) D Popko (Chile) A Tabilo	4	6	[10]
(United States) N Pasha (United States) M Schnur	6	1	[7]
Alt	(Argentina) JM Cerúndolo (Argentina) R Olivo
(Chinese Taipei) J Jung (Japan) G Soeda	w/o
(Poland) S Walków (Poland) J Zieliński	6	6
WC	(Russia) D Golubev (Russia) E Tiurnev	0	2
(Czech Republic) R Jebavý (Slovakia) A Martin	6^{6}	7^{14}	[11]
(India) S Balaji (India) R Ramanathan	7^{8}	6^{12}	[9]
WC	(Croatia) Z Babić (Germany) F Fallert	7^{7}	4	[8]
3	(United States) E King (United States) H Reese	6^{4}	6	[10]
WC	(Croatia) D Ajduković (Croatia) F Ninčević	6	7^{7}
(Argentina) F Coria (Ecuador) E Gómez	3	6^{2}
(Switzerland) L Margaroli (Egypt) M Safwat	3	6^{5}
2	(Monaco) R Arneodo (France) A Olivetti	6	7^{7}

Quarterfinals
1	(Kazakhstan) A Golubev (Kazakhstan) A Nedovyesov	w/o
(Kazakhstan) D Popko (Chile) A Tabilo
(Chinese Taipei) J Jung (Japan) G Soeda	3	4
(Poland) S Walków (Poland) J Zieliński	6	6
(Czech Republic) R Jebavý (Slovakia) A Martin	6	3	[4]
3	(United States) E King (United States) H Reese	2	6	[10]
WC	(Croatia) D Ajduković (Croatia) F Ninčević	5	4
2	(Monaco) R Arneodo (France) A Olivetti	7	6

Semifinals
1	(Kazakhstan) A Golubev (Kazakhstan) A Nedovyesov	7^{7}	6
(Poland) S Walków (Poland) J Zieliński	6^{5}	4
3	(United States) E King (United States) H Reese	7^{10}	3	[10]
2	(Monaco) R Arneodo (France) A Olivetti	6^{8}	6	[5]

Final
1	(Kazakhstan) A Golubev (Kazakhstan) A Nedovyesov	2	6^{4}
3	(United States) E King (United States) H Reese	6	7^{7}
