= 2025 Zagreb Open – Men's singles =

Men's singles
- 2025 Zagreb Open

Final
- Champion: (Croatia) Dino Prižmić
- Runner-up: (France) Luca Van Assche
- Score: 6–2 ret.

Events
Singles	men	women
Doubles	men	women
← 2024 ·	Zagreb Open	· 2026 →

Damir Džumhur was the defending champion but chose not to defend his title.

Dino Prižmić won the title after Luca Van Assche retired after losing the first set 2–6 in the final.

== Seeds ==
1. (France) Adrian Mannarino (first round)
2. (Switzerland) Jérôme Kym (quarterfinals)
3. (Czech Republic) Dalibor Svrčina (first round)
4. (France) Harold Mayot (quarterfinals)
5. (France) Kyrian Jacquet (second round)
6. (Kazakhstan) Dmitry Popko (second round)
7. (Croatia) Duje Ajduković (first round)
8. (Austria) Filip Misolic (quarterfinals)

== Draw ==
=== Key ===
- Q = Qualifier
- WC = Wild card
- LL = Lucky loser
- Alt = Alternate
- ITF = ITF entry
- PR = Protected ranking
- SR = Special ranking
- SE = Special exempt
- JE = Junior exempt
- JR = Junior Accelerator Programme entrant
- CO = College Accelerator Programme entrant
- NG = Next Gen Accelerator Program entrant
- w/o = Walkover
- r = Retired
- d = Defaulted

=== Finals ===
Semifinals
LL	(France) Luka Pavlovic	3	2
(France) Luca Van Assche	6	6
(Argentina) Marco Trungelliti	3	7^{7}	5
WC	(Croatia) Dino Prižmić	6	6^{5}	7

Final
(France) Luca Van Assche	2^{r}
WC	(Croatia) Dino Prižmić	6

=== Top half ===
First round
1	(France) A Mannarino	2	7^{11}	3
Alt	(Peru) G Bueno	6	6^{9}	6
(Belgium) G Onclin	6	2	4
LL	(France) L Pavlovic	1	6	6
Alt	(Croatia) M Poljičak	4	6	7^{7}
Q	(Bosnia and Herzegovina) N Fatić	6	3	6^{2}
WC	(Croatia) M Dodig	4	4
6	(Kazakhstan) D Popko	6	6
3	(Czech Republic) D Svrčina	2	1
(France) L Van Assche	6	6
Q	(Bulgaria) D Kuzmanov	6	7
(Norway) V Durasovic	4	5
Q	(Slovakia) N Gombos	3	3
PR	(Belgium) K Coppejans	6	6
Alt	(Netherlands) M Houkes	1	1
8	(Austria) F Misolic	6	6

Second round
Alt	(Peru) G Bueno	6^{14}	4
LL	(France) L Pavlovic	7^{16}	6
Alt	(Croatia) M Poljičak	6	6
6	(Kazakhstan) D Popko	3	2
(France) L Van Assche	6	6
Q	(Bulgaria) D Kuzmanov	4	2
PR	(Belgium) K Coppejans	6^{5}	6	6^{5}
8	(Austria) F Misolic	7^{7}	2	7^{7}

Quarterfinals
LL	(France) L Pavlovic	6	7
Alt	(Croatia) M Poljičak	1	5
(France) L Van Assche	6	6
8	(Austria) F Misolic	4	4

Semifinals
LL	(France) L Pavlovic	3	2
(France) L Van Assche	6	6

=== Bottom half ===
First round
7	(Croatia) D Ajduković	2	6^{2}
(Argentina) F Mena	6	7^{7}
(Argentina) M Trungelliti	6	2	6
Q	(Austria) N Oberleitner	2	6	4
(United States) Z Svajda	2	3
Q	(Slovakia) M Karol	6	6
(Austria) J Rodionov	5	7^{7}	2
4	(France) H Mayot	7	6^{3}	6
5	(France) K Jacquet	7^{7}	6
(France) U Blanchet	6^{3}	0
WC	(Croatia) D Prižmić	6	6
Q	(Bosnia and Herzegovina) M Bašić	1	2
WC	(Croatia) L Mikrut	4	6	3
(Finland) E Ruusuvuori	6	3	6
(Kazakhstan) B Zhukayev	2	0^{r}
2	(Switzerland) J Kym	6	4

Second round
(Argentina) F Mena	6	4	6^{4}
(Argentina) M Trungelliti	2	6	7^{7}
Q	(Slovakia) M Karol	2	4
4	(France) H Mayot	6	6
5	(France) K Jacquet	5	2
WC	(Croatia) D Prižmić	7	6
(Finland) E Ruusuvuori	2	0
2	(Switzerland) J Kym	6	6

Quarterfinals
(Argentina) M Trungelliti	7^{7}	6
4	(France) H Mayot	6^{4}	2
WC	(Croatia) D Prižmić	6	6
2	(Switzerland) J Kym	2	3

Semifinals
(Argentina) M Trungelliti	3	7^{7}	5
WC	(Croatia) D Prižmić	6	6^{5}	7
