= 2011 Zagreb Open – Women's doubles =

Women's doubles
- 2011 Zagreb Open

Final
- Champions: (Bulgaria) Elitsa Kostova (Poland) Barbara Sobaszkiewicz
- Runners-up: (Croatia) Ani Mijačika (Croatia) Ana Vrljić
- Score: 1–6, 6–3, [12–10]

Events
Singles	men	women
Doubles	men	women
← 2009 ·	Zagreb Open	· 2024 →

This was a new event in 2011 for the ITF Women's Circuit.

Elitsa Kostova and Barbara Sobaszkiewicz won the title, defeating Ani Mijačika and Ana Vrljić 1–6, 6–3, [12–10] in the final.

== Seeds ==
1. (Ukraine) Yulia Beygelzimer / (Romania) Elena Bogdan (semifinals, retired)
2. (Turkey) Çağla Büyükakçay / (Austria) Melanie Klaffner (quarterfinals, withdrew)
3. (Croatia) Maria Abramović / (Italy) Nicole Clerico (first round)
4. (Hungary) Réka-Luca Jani / (Hungary) Katalin Marosi (quarterfinals)

== Draw ==
=== Key ===
- Q = Qualifier
- WC = Wild card
- LL = Lucky loser
- Alt = Alternate
- SE = Special exempt
- PR = Protected ranking
- ITF = ITF entry
- JE = Junior exempt
- w/o = Walkover
- r = Retired
- d = Defaulted
- SR = Special ranking

First round
(Russia) A Tarasova (Russia) J Valetova	6	6
(Croatia) I Filipi (Croatia) D Šunkić	1	3
4	(Hungary) R-L Jani (Hungary) K Marosi	6	7
(Switzerland) M Kraljevic (Serbia) M Špremo	2	5
(Croatia) A Mijačika (Croatia) A Vrljić	6	2	[10]
(Croatia) S Njirić (Australia) O Rogowska	4	6	[8]
(Slovenia) N Kolar (Slovenia) P Reberšak	6	6
(Russia) P Leykina (Croatia) N Rimać	2	0
(Slovakia) L Juríková (Slovakia) K Kučová	4	6	[10]
3	(Croatia) M Abramović (Italy) N Clerico	6	3	[5]
(France) A Bergot (Croatia) T Mrdeža	2	3
(Bulgaria) E Kostova (Poland) B Sobaszkiewicz	6	6

Quarterfinals
1	(Ukraine) Y Beygelzimer (Romania) E Bogdan	6	6
(Russia) A Tarasova (Russia) J Valetova	1	1
4	(Hungary) R-L Jani (Hungary) K Marosi	2	3
(Croatia) A Mijačika (Croatia) A Vrljić	6	6
(Slovenia) N Kolar (Slovenia) P Reberšak	w/o
(Slovakia) L Juríková (Slovakia) K Kučová
(Bulgaria) E Kostova (Poland) B Sobaszkiewicz	w/o
2	(Turkey) Ç Büyükakçay (Austria) M Klaffner

Semifinals
1	(Ukraine) Y Beygelzimer (Romania) E Bogdan	3^{r}
(Croatia) A Mijačika (Croatia) A Vrljić	2
(Slovenia) N Kolar (Slovenia) P Reberšak	1	6	[11]
(Bulgaria) E Kostova (Poland) B Sobaszkiewicz	6	2	[13]

Final
(Croatia) A Mijačika (Croatia) A Vrljić	6	3	[10]
(Bulgaria) E Kostova (Poland) B Sobaszkiewicz	1	6	[12]
