= 2024 Zagreb Open – Women's singles =

Women's singles
- 2024 Zagreb Open

Final
- Champion: (Italy) Giorgia Pedone
- Runner-up: Elena Pridankina
- Score: 2–6, 6–2, 7–5

Events
Singles	men	women
Doubles	men	women
← 2011 ·	Zagreb Open	· 2025 →

The women's tournament returned after a break since 2011.

Giorgia Pedone won the title after defeating Elena Pridankina in the final, 2–6, 6–2, 7–5.

== Seeds ==
All seeds receive a bye into the second round.

1. (France) Léolia Jeanjean (semifinals)
2. (Italy) Nuria Brancaccio (semifinals)
3. Elena Pridankina (final)
4. (Ukraine) Valeriya Strakhova (quarterfinals)
5. (Belgium) Sofia Costoulas (second round)
6. (Italy) Giorgia Pedone (champion)
7. (Bulgaria) Isabella Shinikova (third round)
8. (Netherlands) Anouk Koevermans (quarterfinals)
9. (Croatia) Petra Marčinko (third round)
10. (Greece) Sapfo Sakellaridi (quarterfinals)
11. Daria Lodikova (third round)
12. (Ukraine) Oleksandra Oliynykova (third round)
13. (Hungary) Fanny Stollár (third round)
14. (Italy) Tatiana Pieri (third round)
15. (Canada) Victoria Mboko (second round)
16. (Hungary) Amarissa Tóth (second round, retired)

== Draw ==
=== Key ===
- Q = Qualifier
- WC = Wild card
- LL = Lucky loser
- Alt = Alternate
- ITF = ITF entry
- PR = Protected ranking
- SR = Special ranking
- SE = Special exempt
- JE = Junior exempt
- JR = Junior Accelerator Programme entrant
- CO = College Accelerator Programme entrant
- NG = Next Gen Accelerator Program entrant
- w/o = Walkover
- r = Retired
- d = Defaulted

=== Finals ===
Quarterfinals
1	(France) Léolia Jeanjean	6	6
8	(Netherlands) Anouk Koevermans	2	3
3	Elena Pridankina	6	6
(Croatia) Tara Würth	3	4
6	(Italy) Giorgia Pedone	6	6
4	(Ukraine) Valeriya Strakhova	3	4
10	(Greece) Sapfo Sakellaridi	3	1
2	(Italy) Nuria Brancaccio	6	6

Semifinals
1	(France) Léolia Jeanjean	3	3
3	Elena Pridankina	6	6
6	(Italy) Giorgia Pedone	7^{7}	6
2	(Italy) Nuria Brancaccio	6^{4}	2

Final
3	Elena Pridankina	6	2	5
6	(Italy) Giorgia Pedone	2	6	7

=== Top half ===
==== Section 1 ====
First round
WC	(Croatia) S Svetac	6	6
(Slovenia) N Potočnik	2	3
Q	(Peru) A Iamachkine	3	6	6
Q	E Garkusha	6	3	3
LL	(Australia) N Barbir	0	0
(Germany) Y Morderger	6	6
LL	(Slovenia) K Novak	7^{7}	6
(Germany) T Morderger	6^{5}	4

Second round
1	(France) L Jeanjean	6	6
WC	(Croatia) S Svetac	3	2
Q	(Peru) A Iamachkine	1	2
13	(Hungary) F Stollár	6	6
11	D Lodikova	6	6
(Germany) Y Morderger	0	0
LL	(Slovenia) K Novak	1	1
8	(Netherlands) A Koevermans	6	6

Third round
1	(France) L Jeanjean	5	6	6
13	(Hungary) F Stollár	7	4	2
11	D Lodikova	5	3
8	(Netherlands) A Koevermans	7	6

Quarterfinals
1	(France) L Jeanjean	6	6
8	(Netherlands) A Koevermans	2	3

==== Section 2 ====
First round
Q	(Italy) C Zanolini	7	4	3
Q	(Italy) L Mair	5	6	6
(Brazil) G Cé	6	6
(Turkey) P Özgen	4	4
Q	(Slovakia) V Chramcová	5	1
(Bulgaria) L Karatancheva	7	6
(Croatia) T Würth	6	6
WC	(Croatia) M Ivanković	0	3

Second round
3	E Pridankina	6	6
Q	(Italy) L Mair	0	1
(Brazil) G Cé	4	2
14	(Italy) T Pieri	6	6
9	(Croatia) P Marčinko	7	2	6
(Bulgaria) L Karatancheva	5	6	3
(Croatia) T Würth	6	6
5	(Belgium) S Costoulas	2	4

Third round
3	E Pridankina	6	6
14	(Italy) T Pieri	1	2
9	(Croatia) P Marčinko	1	3
(Croatia) T Würth	6	6

Quarterfinals
3	E Pridankina	6	6
(Croatia) T Würth	3	4

=== Bottom half ===
==== Section 3 ====
First round
(Greece) M Laki	0	3
(Romania) A Prisăcariu	6	6
(Switzerland) N Karamoko	2	2
(Netherlands) E Vedder	6	6
Q	(Italy) G Ceschi	6	6
(Bulgaria) J Stamatova	1	2
WC	(Croatia) D Mišković	2	0
(Italy) A Zantedeschi	6	6

Second round
6	(Italy) G Pedone	2	6	6
(Romania) A Prisăcariu	6	4	2
(Netherlands) E Vedder	3	3
12	(Ukraine) O Oliynykova	6	6
16	(Hungary) A Tóth	1	6	2^{r}
Q	(Italy) G Ceschi	6	3	5
(Italy) A Zantedeschi	7^{8}	2	1
4	(Ukraine) V Strakhova	6^{6}	6	6

Third round
6	(Italy) G Pedone	6	6
12	(Ukraine) O Oliynykova	3	1
Q	(Italy) G Ceschi	2	3
4	(Ukraine) V Strakhova	6	6

Quarterfinals
6	(Italy) G Pedone	6	6
4	(Ukraine) V Strakhova	3	4

==== Section 4 ====
First round
(Slovenia) Ž Falkner	6	6
WC	(Croatia) A Petković	2	3
Q	(Romania) M Toma	4	3
(Czech Republic) M Bayerlová	6	6
(Slovakia) E Méri	7^{7}	6
(Serbia) J Bojović	6^{5}	4
WC	(Croatia) L Ivković	1	2
Q	(Algeria) I Ibbou	6	6

Second round
7	(Bulgaria) I Shinikova	6	7
(Slovenia) Ž Falkner	2	5
(Czech Republic) M Bayerlová	6	1	6^{6}
10	(Greece) S Sakellaridi	3	6	7^{8}
15	(Canada) V Mboko	3	2
(Slovakia) E Méri	6	6
Q	(Algeria) I Ibbou	4	1
2	(Italy) N Brancaccio	6	6

Third round
7	(Bulgaria) I Shinikova	3	4
10	(Greece) S Sakellaridi	6	6
(Slovakia) E Méri	2	1
2	(Italy) N Brancaccio	6	6

Quarterfinals
10	(Greece) S Sakellaridi	3	1
2	(Italy) N Brancaccio	6	6
