= 2022 Zagreb Open – Singles =

Singles
- 2022 Zagreb Open

Final
- Champion: (Austria) Filip Misolic
- Runner-up: (Croatia) Mili Poljičak
- Score: 6–3, 7–6^{(8–6)}

Events
Singles	Doubles
← 2021 ·	Zagreb Open	· 2024 →

Sebastián Báez was the defending champion but chose not to defend his title.

Filip Misolic won the title after defeating Mili Poljičak 6–3, 7–6^{(8–6)} in the final.

== Seeds ==
1. (Australia) Jordan Thompson (first round)
2. (Australia) Aleksandar Vukic (first round)
3. (Australia) Christopher O'Connell (first round)
4. (Bosnia and Herzegovina) Damir Džumhur (withdrew)
5. (Czech Republic) Vít Kopřiva (second round)
6. (Australia) Jason Kubler (semifinals)
7. (Argentina) Juan Pablo Ficovich (first round)
8. (Italy) Federico Gaio (second round)

== Draw ==
=== Key ===
- Q = Qualifier
- WC = Wild card
- LL = Lucky loser
- Alt = Alternate
- SE = Special exempt
- PR = Protected ranking
- ITF = ITF entry
- JE = Junior exempt
- w/o = Walkover
- r = Retired
- d = Defaulted
- SR = Special ranking

=== Finals ===
Semifinals
6	(Australia) Jason Kubler	5	6	3
Q	(Austria) Filip Misolic	7	3	6
Q	(Spain) Carlos Gimeno Valero	4	1
WC	(Croatia) Mili Poljičak	6	6

Final
Q	(Austria) Filip Misolic	6	7^{8}
WC	(Croatia) Mili Poljičak	3	6^{6}

=== Top half ===
First round
1	(Australia) J Thompson	6	6^{5}	2
Q	(China) Y Wu	1	7^{7}	6
Q	(Hungary) F Marozsán	7	1	0^{r}
Alt	(Italy) R Bonadio	5	6	3
(Germany) M Marterer	6	3	1
(Argentina) N Kicker	4	6	6
(Brazil) F Meligeni Alves	1	2
6	(Australia) J Kubler	6	6
LL	(China) J Shang	7^{7}	3	7
(Slovakia) F Horanský	6^{5}	6	5
(Slovakia) L Lacko	4	1
Q	(Austria) F Misolic	6	6
Alt	(Croatia) D Ajduković	6	6
LL	(France) T Lamasine	4	3
(France) A Müller	4	6	6
7	(Argentina) JP Ficovich	6	3	2

Second round
Q	(China) Y Wu	6	7
Alt	(Italy) R Bonadio	3	5
(Argentina) N Kicker	2	2
6	(Australia) J Kubler	6	6
LL	(China) J Shang	2	0
Q	(Austria) F Misolic	6	6
Alt	(Croatia) D Ajduković	7^{7}	6
(France) A Müller	6^{5}	3

Quarterfinals
Q	(China) Y Wu	6^{8}	2
6	(Australia) J Kubler	7^{10}	6
Q	(Austria) F Misolic	7	6
Alt	(Croatia) D Ajduković	5	2

Semifinals
6	(Australia) J Kubler	5	6	3
Q	(Austria) F Misolic	7	3	6

=== Bottom half ===
First round
5	(Czech Republic) V Kopřiva	6	1	6
(Bulgaria) D Kuzmanov	4	6	3
(Croatia) N Serdarušić	6	6
WC	(Croatia) D Prižmić	4	2
(Germany) D Masur	6	2	1
Q	(Bosnia and Herzegovina) N Fatić	3	6	6
Q	(Spain) C Gimeno Valero	1	6	6
3	(Australia) C O'Connell	6	4	3
8	(Italy) F Gaio	7^{7}	6^{3}	6
Q	(Austria) M Neuchrist	6^{2}	7^{7}	4
WC	(Croatia) M Poljičak	7	7^{8}
LL	(China) Zh Zhang	5	6^{6}
(Bosnia and Herzegovina) M Bašić	6	6
WC	(North Macedonia) K Ivanovski	1	1
A Kuznetsov	6	6
2	(Australia) A Vukic	1	1

Second round
5	(Czech Republic) V Kopřiva	3	4
(Croatia) N Serdarušić	6	6
Q	(Bosnia and Herzegovina) N Fatić	3	1
Q	(Spain) C Gimeno Valero	6	6
8	(Italy) F Gaio	3	5
WC	(Croatia) M Poljičak	6	7
(Bosnia and Herzegovina) M Bašić	6	7^{7}
A Kuznetsov	4	6^{5}

Quarterfinals
(Croatia) N Serdarušić	0	4
Q	(Spain) C Gimeno Valero	6	6
WC	(Croatia) M Poljičak	6	6
(Bosnia and Herzegovina) M Bašić	4	1

Semifinals
Q	(Spain) C Gimeno Valero	4	1
WC	(Croatia) M Poljičak	6	6
