= 2011 Zagreb Open – Women's singles =

Women's singles
- 2011 Zagreb Open

Final
- Champion: (France) Nathalie Piquion
- Runner-up: (Serbia) Doroteja Erić
- Score: 6–3, 3–6, 6–1

Events
Singles	men	women
Doubles	men	women
← 2009 ·	Zagreb Open	· 2024 →

The event returned to the ITF Women's Circuit in 2011 after a break in 2010.

Nathalie Piquion won the title, defeating qualifier Doroteja Erić in the final, 6–3, 3–6, 6–1.

== Seeds ==
1. (Turkey) Çağla Büyükakçay (first round)
2. (Slovakia) Kristína Kučová (second round)
3. (Ukraine) Yulia Beygelzimer (semifinals)
4. (Slovakia) Lenka Juríková (second round)
5. (Bulgaria) Elitsa Kostova (quarterfinals)
6. (Romania) Elena Bogdan (first round)
7. (Spain) Estrella Cabeza Candela (first round)
8. (France) Nathalie Piquion (champion)

== Draw ==
=== Key ===
- Q = Qualifier
- WC = Wild card
- LL = Lucky loser
- Alt = Alternate
- SE = Special exempt
- PR = Protected ranking
- ITF = ITF entry
- JE = Junior exempt
- w/o = Walkover
- r = Retired
- d = Defaulted
- SR = Special ranking

=== Finals ===
Semifinals
Q	(Serbia) Doroteja Erić	5	6	6
Q	(Slovenia) Nastja Kolar	7	4	4
3	(Ukraine) Yulia Beygelzimer	6	5	2
8	(France) Nathalie Piquion	2	7	6

Final
Q	(Serbia) Doroteja Erić	3	6	1
8	(France) Nathalie Piquion	6	3	6

=== Top half ===
First round
1	(Turkey) Ç Büyükakçay	2	0
WC	(Croatia) T Mrdeža	6	6
Q	(Serbia) D Erić	6	4	6
(France) I Pavlovic	4	6	4
(Czech Republic) Ka Plíšková	6	6
(Austria) M Klaffner	1	4
(Finland) E Laine	1	3
5	(Bulgaria) E Kostova	6	6
4	(Slovakia) L Juríková	4	7	6
Q	(Spain) I Ferrer Suárez	6	6^{6}	0
Q	(Poland) B Sobaszkiewicz	5	1
Q	(Slovenia) N Kolar	7	6
Q	(Hungary) K Marosi	6	5	6
(Bulgaria) D Evtimova	4	7	3
SR	(Kazakhstan) G Voskoboeva	6	6
6	(Romania) E Bogdan	4	3

Second round
WC	(Croatia) T Mrdeža	6	5	6^{5}
Q	(Serbia) D Erić	3	7	7
(Czech Republic) Ka Plíšková	6	4	5
5	(Bulgaria) E Kostova	1	6	7
4	(Slovakia) L Juríková	7	4	4
Q	(Slovenia) N Kolar	6^{7}	6	6
Q	(Hungary) K Marosi	1	1
SE	(Kazakhstan) G Voskoboeva	6	6

Quarterfinals
Q	(Serbia) D Erić	7	5	6
5	(Bulgaria) E Kostova	5	7	4
Q	(Slovenia) N Kolar	6	7
SE	(Kazakhstan) G Voskoboeva	4	6^{5}

Semifinals
Q	(Serbia) D Erić	5	6	6
Q	(Slovenia) N Kolar	7	4	4

=== Bottom half ===
First round
7	(Spain) E Cabeza Candela	3	1
Q	(Hungary) R-L Jani	6	6
WC	(Switzerland) M Kraljevic	1	2
WC	(Croatia) D Vekić	6	6
(Spain) MT Torró Flor	5	2
Q	(Slovakia) M Hončová	7	6
(France) A Bergot	1	3
3	(Ukraine) Y Beygelzimer	6	6
8	(France) N Piquion	2	6	6
(Croatia) A Vrljić	6	2	2
WC	(Croatia) S Njirić	1	6	6
(Russia) Ar Rodionova	6	2	2
(Slovenia) T Majerič	7	6
Q	(Serbia) T Čurović	5	4
(Australia) O Rogowska	3	3
2	(Slovakia) K Kučová	6	6

Second round
Q	(Hungary) R-L Jani	6	6
WC	(Croatia) D Vekić	2	4
Q	(Slovakia) M Hončová	1	0
3	(Ukraine) Y Beygelzimer	6	6
8	(France) N Piquion	3	7	7
WC	(Croatia) S Njirić	6	6^{2}	5
(Slovenia) T Majerič	6	6
2	(Slovakia) K Kučová	3	1

Quarterfinals
Q	(Hungary) R-L Jani	6^{4}	6	4
3	(Ukraine) Y Beygelzimer	7	4	6
8	(France) N Piquion	7	6
(Slovenia) T Majerič	5	3

Semifinals
3	(Ukraine) Y Beygelzimer	6	5	2
8	(France) N Piquion	2	7	6
