= 2024 Zagreb Open =

- Date: 3–9 June 2024 (men); 5–11 August 2024 (women)
- Edition: 19th (men); 5th (women)
- Category: ATP Challenger Tour; ITF Women's World Tennis Tour
- Prize money: €74,825 (men) $40,000 (women)
- Surface: Clay
- Location: Zagreb, Croatia

Champions

Men's singles
- (Bosnia and Herzegovina) Damir Džumhur

Women's singles
- (Italy) Giorgia Pedone

Men's doubles
- (France) Jonathan Eysseric / (France) Quentin Halys

Women's doubles
- (Slovenia) Živa Falkner / (Hungary) Amarissa Tóth
← 2022 ·	Zagreb Open	· 2025 →

The 2024 Zagreb Open was a professional tennis tournament played on outdoor clay courts. It was part of the 2024 ATP Challenger Tour and the 2024 ITF Women's World Tennis Tour. It took place in Zagreb, Croatia between 3 and 9 June 2024 for men and 5 and 11 August for women.

== ATP singles main-draw entrants ==
=== Seeds ===
Country	Player	Rank^{1}	Seed
BIH	Damir Džumhur	128	1
USA	Nicolas Moreno de Alboran	130	2
ESP	Oriol Roca Batalla	164	3
~~ARG~~	~~Marco Trungelliti~~	~~169~~	~~4~~
FRA	Quentin Halys	187	5
ARG	Genaro Alberto Olivieri	188	6
DOM	Nick Hardt	193	7
POR	Henrique Rocha	203	8
CRO	Dino Prižmić	204	9

- Rankings are as of 27 May 2024.

=== Other entrants ===
The following players received wildcards into the singles main draw:

- (Croatia) Matej Dodig
- (Croatia) Roko Horvat
- (Croatia) Luka Mikrut

The following player received entry into the singles main draw using a protected ranking:

- (Spain) Nicolás Álvarez Varona

The following player received entry into the singles main draw as an alternate:

- (Japan) Rio Noguchi

The following players received entry from the qualifying draw:

- (Netherlands) Guy den Ouden
- (Portugal) Gastão Elias
- (France) Mathys Erhard
- (Croatia) Nino Serdarušić
- (Spain) Carlos Taberner
- Alexey Zakharov

== WTA singles main-draw entrants ==
=== Seeds ===
Nationality	Player	Ranking*	Seeding
FRA	Léolia Jeanjean	154	1
ITA	Nuria Brancaccio	252	2
	Elena Pridankina	259	3
UKR	Valeriya Strakhova	264	4
BEL	Sofia Costoulas	274	5
ITA	Giorgia Pedone	279	6
BUL	Isabella Shinikova	281	7
NED	Anouk Koevermans	282	8
CRO	Petra Marčinko	300	9
GRE	Sapfo Sakellaridi	309	10
	Daria Lodikova	338	11
UKR	Oleksandra Oliynykova	339	12
HUN	Fanny Stollár	345	13
ITA	Tatiana Pieri	352	14
CAN	Victoria Mboko	358	15
HUN	Amarissa Tóth	392	16

- Rankings are as of 29 July, 2024.

=== Other entrants ===
The following players received wildcards into the singles main draw:

- (Croatia) Luna Ivković
- (Croatia) Maria Ivanković
- (Croatia) Dora Mišković
- (Croatia) Ana Petković
- (Croatia) Sara Svetac

The following players received entry from the qualifying draw:

- (Italy) Gloria Ceschi
- (Slovakia) Victoria Chramcová
- Eva Garkusha
- (Peru) Anastasia Iamachkine
- (Algeria) Inès Ibbou
- (Italy) Laura Mair
- (Romania) Maria Toma
- (Italy) Camilla Zanolini

== Champions ==
=== Men's singles ===
- (Bosnia and Herzegovina) Damir Džumhur def. (Croatia) Luka Mikrut 7–5, 6–0.

=== Women's singles ===
- (Italy) Giorgia Pedone def. Elena Pridankina 2–6, 6–2, 7–5.

=== Men's doubles ===
- (France) Jonathan Eysseric / (France) Quentin Halys def. (Romania) Alexandru Jecan / (Portugal) Henrique Rocha 6–4, 6–4.

=== Women's doubles ===
- (Slovenia) Živa Falkner / (Hungary) Amarissa Tóth def. (Bulgaria) Lia Karatancheva / (Greece) Sapfo Sakellaridi 6–4, 6–3.
