= 2024 Zagreb Open – Women's doubles =

Women's doubles
- 2024 Zagreb Open

Final
- Champions: (Slovenia) Živa Falkner (Hungary) Amarissa Tóth
- Runners-up: (Bulgaria) Lia Karatancheva (Greece) Sapfo Sakellaridi
- Score: 6–4, 6–3

Events
Singles	men	women
Doubles	men	women
← 2011 ·	Zagreb Open	· 2025 →

The women's tournament returned after a break since 2011.

Živa Falkner and Amarissa Tóth won the title after defeating Lia Karatancheva and Sapfo Sakellaridi 6–4, 6–3 in the final.

== Seeds ==
1. (Ukraine) Valeriya Strakhova / (Netherlands) Eva Vedder (quarterfinals)
2. (Bulgaria) Lia Karatancheva / (Greece) Sapfo Sakellaridi (final)
3. Elena Pridankina / (Bulgaria) Isabella Shinikova (quarterfinals)
4. (Germany) Tayisiya Morderger / (Germany) Yana Morderger (semifinals)

== Draw ==
=== Key ===
- Q = Qualifier
- WC = Wild card
- LL = Lucky loser
- Alt = Alternate
- ITF = ITF entry
- PR = Protected ranking
- SR = Special ranking
- SE = Special exempt
- JE = Junior exempt
- JR = Junior Accelerator Programme entrant
- CO = College Accelerator Programme entrant
- NG = Next Gen Accelerator Program entrant
- w/o = Walkover
- r = Retired
- d = Defaulted

=== Draw ===
First round
1	(Ukraine) V Strakhova (Netherlands) E Vedder	3	6	[10]
(Croatia) M Dražić (Romania) A Prisăcariu	6	0	[7]
(Algeria) I Ibbou (Switzerland) N Karamoko	6	6
(Australia) N Barbir (Ukraine) M Kostyuk	1	1
3	E Pridankina (Bulgaria) I Shinikova	6	6
(Czech Republic) M Bayerlová (Slovenia) K Novak	4	2
D Lodikova (Belgium) S Costoulas	1	1
(Slovenia) Ž Falkner (Hungary) A Tóth	6	6
WC	(Croatia) M Ivanković (Bosnia and Herzegovina) S Mikača	0	2
(Bulgaria) J Stamatova; E Garkusha	6	6
(Germany) M Hodzic (Greece) M Laki	3	3
4	(Germany) T Morderger (Germany) Y Morderger	6	6
(Italy) G Ceschi (Romania) M Toma	2	6	[11]
(Croatia) D Mišković (Croatia) S Svetac	6	4	[9]
WC	(Croatia) L Ivković (Croatia) C Jerolimov	1	1
2	(Bulgaria) L Karatancheva (Greece) S Sakellaridi	6	6

Quarterfinals
1	(Ukraine) V Strakhova (Netherlands) E Vedder	5	5
(Algeria) I Ibbou (Switzerland) N Karamoko	7	7
3	E Pridankina (Bulgaria) I Shinikova	3	5
(Slovenia) Ž Falkner (Hungary) A Tóth	6	7
(Bulgaria) J Stamatova; E Garkusha	4	4
4	(Germany) T Morderger (Germany) Y Morderger	6	6
(Italy) G Ceschi (Romania) M Toma	6	3	[4]
2	(Bulgaria) L Karatancheva (Greece) S Sakellaridi	3	6	[10]

Semifinals
(Algeria) I Ibbou (Switzerland) N Karamoko	5	0
(Slovenia) Ž Falkner (Hungary) A Tóth	7	6
4	(Germany) T Morderger (Germany) Y Morderger	4	3
2	(Bulgaria) L Karatancheva (Greece) S Sakellaridi	6	6

Final
(Slovenia) Ž Falkner (Hungary) A Tóth	6	6
2	(Bulgaria) L Karatancheva (Greece) S Sakellaridi	4	3
