= 2021 Zagreb Open – Singles =

Singles
- 2021 Zagreb Open

Final
- Champion: (Argentina) Sebastián Báez
- Runner-up: (Peru) Juan Pablo Varillas
- Score: 3–6, 6–3, 6–1

Events
Singles	Doubles
← 2011 ·	Zagreb Open	· 2022 →

This was the first edition of the tournament since 2011.

Sebastián Báez won the title after defeating Juan Pablo Varillas 3–6, 6–3, 6–1 in the final.

== Seeds ==
1. (Argentina) Federico Coria (second round)
2. (Spain) Pedro Martínez (quarterfinals)
3. (Slovakia) Andrej Martin (second round)
4. (Japan) Yasutaka Uchiyama (first round)
5. (Portugal) Pedro Sousa (first round)
6. (France) Benjamin Bonzi (first round)
7. (Bosnia and Herzegovina) Damir Džumhur (second round)
8. (Brazil) Thiago Seyboth Wild (quarterfinals)

== Draw ==
=== Key ===
- Q = Qualifier
- WC = Wild card
- LL = Lucky loser
- Alt = Alternate
- SE = Special exempt
- PR = Protected ranking
- ITF = ITF entry
- JE = Junior exempt
- w/o = Walkover
- r = Retired
- d = Defaulted
- SR = Special ranking

=== Finals ===
Semifinals
(Argentina) Juan Manuel Cerúndolo	1^{r}
(Peru) Juan Pablo Varillas	5
Q	(Chile) Marcelo Tomás Barrios Vera	3	4
Q	(Argentina) Sebastián Báez	6	6

Final
(Peru) Juan Pablo Varillas	6	3	1
Q	(Argentina) Sebastián Báez	3	6	6

=== Top half ===
First round
1	(Argentina) F Coria	6	7^{9}
(Egypt) M Safwat	4	6^{7}
(Argentina) JM Cerúndolo	6	6
(Russia) E Donskoy	3	2
(Netherlands) B van de Zandschulp	6	3	7
(United States) M Mmoh	4	6	5
(Chile) A Tabilo	6	6
6	(France) B Bonzi	4	1
4	(Japan) Y Uchiyama	3	2
(Serbia) N Milojević	6	6
(Argentina) L Mayer	6	6^{4}	6
(Portugal) F Ferreira Silva	3	7^{7}	3
WC	(Croatia) Antun Vidak	0	1
(Slovenia) B Rola	6	6
(Peru) JP Varillas	7^{7}	7
5	(Portugal) P Sousa	6^{4}	5

Second round
1	(Argentina) F Coria	6^{4}	2
(Argentina) JM Cerúndolo	7^{7}	6
(Netherlands) B van de Zandschulp	6	2	6
(Chile) A Tabilo	1	6	4
(Serbia) N Milojević	7^{7}	6
(Argentina) L Mayer	6^{4}	2
(Slovenia) B Rola	4	2
(Peru) JP Varillas	6	6

Quarterfinals
(Argentina) JM Cerúndolo	6	6^{3}	6
(Netherlands) B van de Zandschulp	4	7^{7}	2
(Serbia) N Milojević	6^{3}	3
(Peru) JP Varillas	7^{7}	6

Semifinals
(Argentina) JM Cerúndolo	1^{r}
(Peru) JP Varillas	5

=== Bottom half ===
First round
8	(Brazil) T Seyboth Wild	0	7	7
(Russia) R Safiullin	6	5	5
Q	(Latvia) E Gulbis	6^{5}	6^{5}
WC	(Croatia) B Gojo	7^{7}	7^{7}
Alt	(Kazakhstan) D Popko	4	2
Q	(Chile) MT Barrios Vera	6	6
(Chinese Taipei) J Jung	6	6^{4}	0^{r}
3	(Slovakia) A Martin	2	7^{7}	4
7	(Bosnia and Herzegovina) D Džumhur	6	6
(Japan) G Soeda	4	3
Q	(Argentina) S Báez	6	6
Q	(India) R Ramanathan	4	0
(Poland) K Żuk	4	6	6
(Austria) J Rodionov	6	3	3
WC	(Croatia) N Serdarušić	4	7^{7}	3
2	(Spain) P Martínez	6	6^{1}	6

Second round
8	(Brazil) T Seyboth Wild	7	6
WC	(Croatia) B Gojo	5	4
Q	(Chile) MT Barrios Vera	2	6	6
3	(Slovakia) A Martin	6	3	2
7	(Bosnia and Herzegovina) D Džumhur	7^{7}	1	5
Q	(Argentina) S Báez	6^{5}	6	7
(Poland) K Żuk	6^{6}	2
2	(Spain) P Martínez	7^{8}	6

Quarterfinals
8	(Brazil) T Seyboth Wild	4	2
Q	(Chile) MT Barrios Vera	6	6
Q	(Argentina) S Báez	3	6	6
2	(Spain) P Martínez	6	3	4

Semifinals
Q	(Chile) MT Barrios Vera	3	4
Q	(Argentina) S Báez	6	6
