= 2026 De Wave Open Challenger – Doubles =

Doubles
- 2026 De Wave Open Challenger

Final
- Champions: (Spain) Íñigo Cervantes (Ukraine) Denys Molchanov
- Runners-up: (Finland) Patrik Niklas-Salminen (Czech Republic) Michael Vrbenský
- Score: 6–2, 6–7^{(6–8)}, [10–7]

Events
Singles	Doubles
- De Wave Open Challenger

This was the first edition of the tournament.

Íñigo Cervantes and Denys Molchanov won the title after defeating Patrik Niklas-Salminen and Michael Vrbenský 6–2, 6–7^{(6–8)}, [10–7] in the final.

== Seeds ==
1. (Croatia) Admir Kalender / (Croatia) Nino Serdarušić (withdrew)
2. (Finland) Patrik Niklas-Salminen / (Czech Republic) Michael Vrbenský (final)
3. (Spain) Sergio Martos Gornés / (Poland) Szymon Walków (semifinals)
4. (Spain) Íñigo Cervantes / (Ukraine) Denys Molchanov (champions)
5. (Germany) Tim Rühl / (Netherlands) Mick Veldheer (first round, withdrew)

== Draw ==
Key

- Q = Qualifier
- WC = Wild card
- LL = Lucky loser
- Alt = Alternate
- ITF = ITF entry
- PR = Protected ranking
- SR = Special ranking
- SE = Special exempt
- JE = Junior exempt
- JR = Junior Accelerator Programme entrant
- CO = College Accelerator Programme entrant
- NG = Next Gen Accelerator Program entrant
- w/o = Walkover
- r = Retired
- d = Defaulted

First round
5	(Germany) T Rühl (Netherlands) M Veldheer
(Germany) F Broska (Italy) G Oradini	w/o
WC	(Italy) Alessandro Ceppellini (Italy) Elia Ruffino	4	5
Alt	(Italy) F Arnaboldi (Italy) Federico Iannaccone	6	7
4	(Spain) Í Cervantes (Ukraine) D Molchanov	w/o
Alt	(Italy) F Passaro (Italy) Matteo Vavassori
(Venezuela) Juan José Bianchi (Australia) K Pearson	6	3	[10]
(Netherlands) M Hermans (Netherlands) Ryan Nijboer	3	6	[7]
(France) Marko Marić (Serbia) Tadija Radovanović	6	6
(Italy) Simone Agostini (Argentina) Jorge Robinson	4	2
(Romania) A Jecan (Spain) D Vega Hernández	4	6^{8}
3	(Spain) S Martos Gornés (Poland) S Walków	6	7^{10}
(Greece) D Sakellaridis (Ukraine) V Uzhylovskyi	7^{7}	6
WC	(Italy) Lorenzo Berto (Italy) Iannis Miletich	6^{3}	3
PR	(Zimbabwe) B Lock (Zimbabwe) CJ Lock	3	6^{4}
2	(Finland) P Niklas-Salminen (Czech Republic) M Vrbenský	6	7^{7}

Quarterfinals
(Germany) F Broska (Italy) G Oradini	4	6	[12]
Alt	(Italy) F Arnaboldi (Italy) F Iannaccone	6	1	[10]
4	(Spain) Í Cervantes (Ukraine) D Molchanov	6	6
(Venezuela) JJ Bianchi (Australia) K Pearson	2	2
(France) M Marić (Serbia) T Radovanović	2	2
3	(Spain) S Martos Gornés (Poland) S Walków	6	6
(Greece) D Sakellaridis (Ukraine) V Uzhylovskyi	4	1
2	(Finland) P Niklas-Salminen (Czech Republic) M Vrbenský	6	6

Semifinals
(Germany) F Broska (Italy) G Oradini	4	4
4	(Spain) Í Cervantes (Ukraine) D Molchanov	6	6
3	(Spain) S Martos Gornés (Poland) S Walków	6^{2}	3
2	(Finland) P Niklas-Salminen (Czech Republic) M Vrbenský	7^{7}	6

Final
4	(Spain) Í Cervantes (Ukraine) D Molchanov	6	6^{6}	[10]
2	(Finland) P Niklas-Salminen (Czech Republic) M Vrbenský	2	7^{8}	[7]
