= 2011 Zagreb Open =

- Date: May 9–16, 2011
- Edition: 16th (men); 4th (women)
- Location: Zagreb, Croatia

Champions

Men's singles
- (Argentina) Diego Junqueira

Women's singles
- (France) Nathalie Piquion

Men's doubles
- (Spain) Daniel Muñoz de la Nava / (Spain) Rubén Ramírez Hidalgo

Women's doubles
- (Bulgaria) Elitsa Kostova / (Poland) Barbara Sobaszkiewicz
← 2010 ·	Zagreb Open	· 2021 →

The 2011 Zagreb Open (Also known as the Pliva Zagreb Open for sponsorship reasons) was a professional tennis tournament played on outdoor red clay courts. This event was the 16th edition of the tournament and was part of the 2011 ATP Challenger Tour and 2011 ITF Women's Circuit. It took place in Zagreb, Croatia May 9–16, 2011.

== ATP singles main draw entrants ==
=== Seeds ===
Nationality	Player	Ranking*	Seeding
CRO	Ivan Dodig	45	1
IND	Somdev Devvarman	70	2
GER	Denis Gremelmayr	95	3
ESP	Rubén Ramírez Hidalgo	97	4
CZE	Jaroslav Pospíšil	106	5
GER	Björn Phau	111	6
GER	Dustin Brown	119	7
SVK	Lukáš Lacko	121	8

- Rankings are as of May 2, 2010.

=== Other entrants ===
The following players received wildcards into the singles main draw:

- (Croatia) Kristijan Mesaroš
- (Austria) Thomas Muster
- (Croatia) Borut Puc
- (Croatia) Antonio Veić

The following players received entry from the qualifying draw:

- (Spain) Guillermo Alcaide
- (Italy) Andrea Arnaboldi
- (Russia) Andrey Kuznetsov
- (Croatia) Nikola Mektić

== WTA entrants ==
=== Seeds ===
Nationality	Player	Ranking*	Seeding
TUR	Çağla Büyükakçay	162	1
SVK	Kristína Kučová	175	2
UKR	Yuliya Beygelzimer	189	3
SVK	Lenka Juríková	196	4
BUL	Elitsa Kostova	197	5
ROU	Elena Bogdan	201	6
ESP	Estrella Cabeza Candela	202	7
FRA	Nathalie Piquion	208	8

- Rankings are as of May 2, 2010.

=== Other entrants ===
The following players received wildcards into the singles main draw:

- (Switzerland) Mateja Kraljevic
- (Croatia) Tereza Mrdeža
- (Croatia) Silvia Njirić
- (Croatia) Donna Vekić

The following players received entry from the qualifying draw:

- (Serbia) Tamara Čurović
- (Serbia) Doroteja Erić
- (Spain) Inés Ferrer-Suárez
- (Slovakia) Michaela Hončová
- (Hungary) Réka-Luca Jani
- (Slovenia) Nastja Kolar
- (Hungary) Katalin Marosi
- (Poland) Barbara Sobaszkiewicz

== Champions ==
=== Men's singles ===
(Argentina) Diego Junqueira def. (Brazil) João Souza, 6–3, 6–4

=== Women's singles ===
(France) Nathalie Piquion def. (Serbia) Doroteja Erić, 6–3, 3–6, 6–1

=== Men's doubles ===
(Spain) Daniel Muñoz de la Nava / (Spain) Rubén Ramírez Hidalgo def. (Croatia) Mate Pavić / (Croatia) Franko Škugor, 6–2, 7–6(10)

=== Women's doubles ===
(Bulgaria) Elitsa Kostova / (Poland) Barbara Sobaszkiewicz def. (Croatia) Ani Mijačika / (Croatia) Ana Vrljić, 1–6, 6–3, [12–10]
