= 2011 Zagreb Open – Men's doubles =

Men's doubles
- 2011 Zagreb Open

Final
- Champions: (Spain) Daniel Muñoz-de la Nava (Spain) Rubén Ramírez Hidalgo
- Runners-up: (Croatia) Mate Pavić (Croatia) Franko Škugor
- Score: 6–2, 7–6(10)

Events
Singles	men	women
Doubles	men	women
← 2010 ·	Zagreb Open	· 2021 →

Andre Begemann and Matthew Ebden were the defending champions but decided not to participate.
Daniel Muñoz-de la Nava and Rubén Ramírez Hidalgo won the title, defeating Mate Pavić and Franko Škugor 6–2, 7–6(10) in the final.

== Seeds ==
1. (Austria) Martin Slanar / (Slovakia) Igor Zelenay (first round)
2. (Spain) Daniel Muñoz-de la Nava / (Spain) Rubén Ramírez Hidalgo (champions)
3. (Poland) Tomasz Bednarek / (Poland) Mateusz Kowalczyk (quarterfinals)
4. (United States) Travis Rettenmaier / (Germany) Simon Stadler (quarterfinals)

== Draw ==
=== Key ===
- Q = Qualifier
- WC = Wild card
- LL = Lucky loser
- Alt = Alternate
- SE = Special exempt
- PR = Protected ranking
- ITF = ITF entry
- JE = Junior exempt
- w/o = Walkover
- r = Retired
- d = Defaulted
- SR = Special ranking

=== Draw ===
First round
1	(Austria) M Slanar (Slovakia) I Zelenay	7	5	[6]
(United States) R Harrison (United States) D Martin	5	7	[10]
(Croatia) I Dodig (Croatia) A Veić	6	6
WC	(Croatia) R Karanušić (Croatia) D Marcan	4	4
3	(Poland) T Bednarek (Poland) M Kowalczyk	6	6^{10}	[10]
(Serbia) D Vemić (Croatia) L Zovko	4	7	[3]
WC	(Croatia) N Mektić (Croatia) I Zovko	3	3
WC	(Croatia) M Pavić (Croatia) F Škugor	6	6
(Switzerland) Y Allegro (India) S Devvarman	4	6	[7]
(Germany) D Brown (Germany) D Meffert	6	3	[10]
(Argentina) D Junqueira (Argentina) L Mayer	1	6	[8]
4	(United States) T Rettenmaier (Germany) S Stadler	6	4	[10]
(South Africa) R de Voest (South Africa) I van der Merwe	4	6	[4]
(Germany) D Gremelmayr (Germany) B Phau	6	4	[10]
(France) O Charroin (Italy) A Motti	5	3
2	(Spain) D Muñoz-de la Nava (Spain) R Ramírez Hidalgo	7	6

Quarterfinals
(United States) R Harrison (United States) D Martin	w/o
(Croatia) I Dodig (Croatia) A Veić
3	(Poland) T Bednarek (Poland) M Kowalczyk	1	6	[7]
WC	(Croatia) M Pavić (Croatia) F Škugor	6	3	[10]
(Germany) D Brown (Germany) D Meffert	6	7
4	(United States) T Rettenmaier (Germany) S Stadler	3	6^{2}
(Germany) D Gremelmayr (Germany) B Phau	6	4	[7]
2	(Spain) D Muñoz-de la Nava (Spain) R Ramírez Hidalgo	3	6	[10]

Semifinals
(United States) R Harrison (United States) D Martin	5	6	[2]
WC	(Croatia) M Pavić (Croatia) F Škugor	7	3	[10]
(Germany) D Brown (Germany) D Meffert	6^{4}	5
2	(Spain) D Muñoz-de la Nava (Spain) R Ramírez Hidalgo	7	7

Final
WC	(Croatia) M Pavić (Croatia) F Škugor	2	6^{10}
2	(Spain) D Muñoz-de la Nava (Spain) R Ramírez Hidalgo	6	7
