= 2024 Zagreb Open – Men's singles =

Men's singles
- 2024 Zagreb Open

Final
- Champion: (Bosnia and Herzegovina) Damir Džumhur
- Runner-up: (Croatia) Luka Mikrut
- Score: 7–5, 6–0

Events
Singles	men	women
Doubles	men	women
← 2022 ·	Zagreb Open	· 2025 →

Filip Misolic was the defending champion but lost in the second round to Oriol Roca Batalla.

Damir Džumhur won the title after defeating Luka Mikrut 7–5, 6–0 in the final.

== Seeds ==
1. (Bosnia and Herzegovina) Damir Džumhur (champion)
2. (United States) Nicolas Moreno de Alboran (first round)
3. (Spain) Oriol Roca Batalla (semifinals)
4. (Argentina) Marco Trungelliti (withdrew)
5. (France) Quentin Halys (first round)
6. (Argentina) Genaro Alberto Olivieri (first round)
7. (Dominican Republic) Nick Hardt (quarterfinals)
8. (Portugal) Henrique Rocha (second round)
9. (Croatia) Dino Prižmić (second round)

== Draw ==
=== Key ===
- Q = Qualifier
- WC = Wild card
- LL = Lucky loser
- Alt = Alternate
- SE = Special exempt
- PR = Protected ranking
- ITF = ITF entry
- JE = Junior exempt
- w/o = Walkover
- r = Retired
- d = Defaulted
- SR = Special ranking

=== Finals ===
Semifinals
1	(Bosnia and Herzegovina) Damir Džumhur	4	6	6
3	(Spain) Oriol Roca Batalla	6	4	4
WC	(Croatia) Matej Dodig	7^{7}	2	2
WC	(Croatia) Luka Mikrut	6^{4}	6	6

Final
1	(Bosnia and Herzegovina) Damir Džumhur	7	6
WC	(Croatia) Luka Mikrut	5	0

=== Top half ===
First round
1	(Bosnia and Herzegovina) D Džumhur	5	6	6
(Spain) D Jordà Sanchis	7	4	2
(Bosnia and Herzegovina) N Fatić	6	0
(Bulgaria) A Andreev	1	0^{r}
Q	(France) Mathys Erhard	7	6
(Spain) D Rincón	5	2
Y Demin	7^{8}	2	1
7	(Dominican Republic) N Hardt	6^{6}	6	6
3	(Spain) O Roca Batalla	7^{8}	6
Q	(Portugal) G Elias	6^{6}	4
Q	A Zakharov	6^{5}	7	3
(Austria) F Misolic	7^{7}	5	6
(Italy) E Dalla Valle	6	6
Alt	(Japan) R Noguchi	3	3
(Italy) F Maestrelli	2	6	6
5	(France) Q Halys	6	4	4

Second round
1	(Bosnia and Herzegovina) D Džumhur	6	4	6
(Bosnia and Herzegovina) N Fatić	2	6	3
Q	(France) M Erhard	3	2
7	(Dominican Republic) N Hardt	6	6
3	(Spain) O Roca Batalla	6	7^{7}
(Austria) F Misolic	4	6^{5}
(Italy) E Dalla Valle	7^{7}	6
(Italy) F Maestrelli	6^{4}	2

Quarterfinals
1	(Bosnia and Herzegovina) D Džumhur	6	6
7	(Dominican Republic) N Hardt	3	4
3	(Spain) O Roca Batalla	6	6
(Italy) E Dalla Valle	3	2

Semifinals
1	(Bosnia and Herzegovina) D Džumhur	4	6	6
3	(Spain) O Roca Batalla	6	4	4

=== Bottom half ===
First round
6	(Argentina) GA Olivieri	1	2
Q	(Croatia) N Serdarušić	6	6
Q	(Spain) C Taberner	3	6	1
WC	(Croatia) M Dodig	6	0	6
(Argentina) R Olivo	7^{7}	2	5
(Kazakhstan) D Popko	6^{2}	6	7
(Tunisia) A Dougaz	3	6	5
9	(Croatia) D Prižmić	6	3	7
8	(Portugal) H Rocha	6	6
PR	(Spain) N Álvarez Varona	3	4
WC	(Croatia) Roko Horvat	1	6^{2}
WC	(Croatia) L Mikrut	6	7^{7}
Q	(Netherlands) G den Ouden	6	5	6^{5}
(France) E Couacaud	3	7	7^{7}
(Mexico) R Pacheco Méndez	6	6
2	(United States) N Moreno de Alboran	4	3

Second round
Q	(Croatia) N Serdarušić	6	1	2
WC	(Croatia) M Dodig	4	6	6
(Kazakhstan) D Popko	6	6
9	(Croatia) D Prižmić	2	4
8	(Portugal) H Rocha	3	2
WC	(Croatia) L Mikrut	6	6
(France) E Couacaud	7^{7}	5	2
(Mexico) R Pacheco Méndez	6^{1}	7	6

Quarterfinals
WC	(Croatia) M Dodig	7	4	6
(Kazakhstan) D Popko	5	6	4
WC	(Croatia) L Mikrut	6	2	7
(Mexico) R Pacheco Méndez	3	6	5

Semifinals
WC	(Croatia) M Dodig	7^{7}	2	2
WC	(Croatia) L Mikrut	6^{4}	6	6
