= 2026 De Wave Open Challenger – Singles =

Singles
- 2026 De Wave Open Challenger

Final
- Champion: (Croatia) Luka Mikrut
- Runner-up: (Italy) Carlo Alberto Caniato
- Score: 6–4, 7–5

Events
Singles	Doubles
- De Wave Open Challenger

This was the first edition of the tournament.

Luka Mikrut won the title after defeating Carlo Alberto Caniato 6–4, 7–5 in the final.

== Seeds ==
1. (Italy) Stefano Travaglia (first round)
2. (Germany) Tom Gentzsch (second round)
3. (Austria) Lukas Neumayer (quarterfinals)
4. (Italy) Francesco Passaro (first round)
5. (Italy) Gianluca Cadenasso (first round)
6. (Belgium) Kimmer Coppejans (second round)
7. (Italy) Raúl Brancaccio (second round)
8. (United Kingdom) Jay Clarke (quarterfinals, retired)

== Draw ==
Key

- Q = Qualifier
- WC = Wild card
- LL = Lucky loser
- Alt = Alternate
- ITF = ITF entry
- PR = Protected ranking
- SR = Special ranking
- SE = Special exempt
- JE = Junior exempt
- JR = Junior Accelerator Programme entrant
- CO = College Accelerator Programme entrant
- NG = Next Gen Accelerator Program entrant
- w/o = Walkover
- r = Retired
- d = Defaulted

=== Finals ===
Semifinals
(Germany) Marvin Möller	3	6	6^{3}
(Croatia) Luka Mikrut	6	3	7^{7}
Alt	(Italy) Francesco Forti	2	4
SE	(Italy) Carlo Alberto Caniato	6	6

Final
(Croatia) Luka Mikrut	6	7
SE	(Italy) Carlo Alberto Caniato	4	5

=== Top half ===
First round
1	(Italy) S Travaglia	4	6	2
(Germany) M Möller	6	4	6
WC	(Italy) F Arnaboldi	6	7^{7}
(Germany) F Broska	1	6^{3}
(United States) Dali Blanch	6	6
(Austria) S Kopp	3	3
Alt	(Czech Republic) Matthew William Donald	6	4	7
5	(Italy) G Cadenasso	3	6	5
3	(Austria) L Neumayer	6	7^{7}
Q	(Italy) Stefano D'Agostino	3	6^{4}
Alt	(Italy) Juan Cruz Martin Manzano	6	6
WC	(Italy) S Pieri	4	2
Q	(Italy) Federico Iannaccone	1	2
(Croatia) L Mikrut	6	6
(France) Sean Cuenin	6^{6}	0^{r}
6	(Belgium) K Coppejans	7^{8}	0

Second round
(Germany) M Möller	6	6
WC	(Italy) F Arnaboldi	4	4
(United States) Dal Blanch	6	6
Alt	(Czech Republic) MW Donald	3	1
3	(Austria) L Neumayer	0	6	6
Alt	(Italy) JC Martin Manzano	6	4	1
(Croatia) L Mikrut	6	6
6	(Belgium) K Coppejans	1	1

Quarterfinals
(Germany) M Möller	6	4	6
(United States) Dal Blanch	3	6	3
3	(Austria) L Neumayer	3	4
(Croatia) L Mikrut	6	6

Semifinals
(Germany) M Möller	3	6	6^{3}
(Croatia) L Mikrut	6	3	7^{7}

=== Bottom half ===
First round
7	(Italy) R Brancaccio	7^{7}	6
(Italy) F Romano	6^{4}	2
NG	(Germany) Mika Petkovic	4	6	6
(Brazil) T Monteiro	6	4	1
LL	(Netherlands) Ryan Nijboer	3	4
Alt	(Italy) F Forti	6	6
Q	(Spain) Alejandro Juan Mano	0	7^{7}	6
4	(Italy) F Passaro	6	6^{4}	1
8	(United Kingdom) J Clarke	7	6
Q	(Germany) John Sperle	5	3
WC	(Italy) Giuseppe La Vela	7^{8}	7^{8}
Q	(Italy) G Oradini	6^{6}	6^{6}
SE	(Italy) CA Caniato	6	7
Q	(Italy) Lorenzo Berto	1	5
(Italy) E Dalla Valle	4	6^{5}
2	(Germany) T Gentzsch	6	7^{7}

Second round
7	(Italy) R Brancaccio	4	6^{1}
NG	(Germany) M Petkovic	6	7^{7}
Alt	(Italy) F Forti	6	6
Q	(Spain) A Juan Mano	1	2
8	(United Kingdom) J Clarke	6	6
WC	(Italy) G La Vela	1	2
SE	(Italy) CA Caniato	6	5	7
2	(Germany) T Gentzsch	3	7	5

Quarterfinals
NG	(Germany) M Petkovic	4	7	2
Alt	(Italy) F Forti	6	5	6
8	(United Kingdom) J Clarke	0	0^{r}
SE	(Italy) CA Caniato	6	2

Semifinals
Alt	(Italy) F Forti	2	4
SE	(Italy) CA Caniato	6	6
