= 2011 Zagreb Open – Men's singles =

Men's singles
- 2011 Zagreb Open

Final
- Champion: (Argentina) Diego Junqueira
- Runner-up: (Brazil) João Souza
- Score: 6–3, 6–4

Events
Singles	men	women
Doubles	men	women
← 2010 ·	Zagreb Open	· 2021 →

Yuri Schukin was the defending champion but chose to compete in Bordeaux instead.
Diego Junqueira won this tournament. He defeated João Souza 6–3, 6–4 in the final.

== Seeds ==
1. (Croatia) Ivan Dodig (quarterfinals)
2. (India) Somdev Devvarman (first round)
3. (Germany) Denis Gremelmayr (second round)
4. (Spain) Rubén Ramírez Hidalgo (first round)
5. (Czech Republic) Jaroslav Pospíšil (first round)
6. (Germany) Björn Phau (first round)
7. (Germany) Dustin Brown (second round)
8. (Slovakia) Lukáš Lacko (first round)

== Draw ==
Key

- Q = Qualifier
- WC = Wild card
- LL = Lucky loser
- Alt = Alternate
- ITF = ITF entry
- PR = Protected ranking
- SR = Special ranking
- SE = Special exempt
- JE = Junior exempt
- JR = Junior Accelerator Programme entrant
- CO = College Accelerator Programme entrant
- NG = Next Gen Accelerator Program entrant
- w/o = Walkover
- r = Retired
- d = Defaulted

=== Finals ===
Semifinals
(Slovakia) Martin Kližan	5	3
(Argentina) Diego Junqueira	7	6
Q	(Italy) Andrea Arnaboldi	5	6^{6}
(Brazil) João Souza	7	7

Final
(Argentina) Diego Junqueira	6	6
(Brazil) João Souza	3	4

=== Top half ===
First round
1	(Croatia) I Dodig	6	6
(South Africa) R de Voest	3	2
(Poland) J Janowicz	6	3	6
(South Africa) I van der Merwe	3	6	4
(Slovakia) M Kližan	6	6
(Germany) S Greul	2	2
(Italy) S Vagnozzi	2	6	3
7	(Germany) D Brown	6	2	6
3	(Germany) D Gremelmayr	6	7
(Spain) D Muñoz-De La Nava	4	6^{5}
(Australia) P Luczak	3	4
Q	(Croatia) N Mektić	6	6
Q	(Spain) G Alcaide	6	6
WC	(Austria) T Muster	3	4
(Argentina) D Junqueira	6	6
8	(Slovakia) L Lacko	3	3

Second round
1	(Croatia) I Dodig	6^{3}	6	7
(Poland) J Janowicz	7	4	5
(Slovakia) M Kližan	6	6
7	(Germany) D Brown	4	3
3	(Germany) D Gremelmayr	2	7	6^{6}
Q	(Croatia) N Mektić	6	5	7
Q	(Spain) G Alcaide	6^{4}	2
(Argentina) D Junqueira	7	6

Quarterfinals
1	(Croatia) I Dodig	6^{2}	6	3
(Slovakia) M Kližan	7	2	6
Q	(Croatia) N Mektić	6^{8}	2
(Argentina) D Junqueira	7	6

Semifinals
(Slovakia) M Kližan	5	3
(Argentina) D Junqueira	7	6

=== Bottom half ===
First round
5	(Czech Republic) J Pospíšil	4	2
WC	(Croatia) K Mesaroš	6	6
(Argentina) L Mayer	6	4	6
(United States) R Harrison	4	6	3
(Switzerland) M Chiudinelli	3	4
Q	(Italy) Andrea Arnaboldi	6	6
WC	(Croatia) B Puc	6	2	6
4	(Spain) R Ramírez Hidalgo	4	6	3
6	(Germany) B Phau	4	3
(Germany) B Knittel	6	6
Q	(Russia) A Kuznetsov	7	3	1
(Brazil) J Souza	6^{4}	6	6
(Germany) D Meffert	7	7
(Croatia) F Škugor	6^{3}	6^{5}
WC	(Croatia) A Veić	6	6
2	(India) S Devvarman	3	2

Second round
WC	(Croatia) K Mesaroš	7	6
(Argentina) L Mayer	6^{7}	0
Q	(Italy) A Arnaboldi	3	6	6
WC	(Croatia) B Puc	6	3	3
(Germany) B Knittel	4	1
(Brazil) J Souza	6	6
(Germany) D Meffert	6	6
WC	(Croatia) A Veić	4	2

Quarterfinals
WC	(Croatia) K Mesaroš	1	4
Q	(Italy) A Arnaboldi	6	6
(Brazil) J Souza	6	7
(Germany) D Meffert	0	5

Semifinals
Q	(Italy) A Arnaboldi	5	6^{6}
(Brazil) J Souza	7	7
