= 2025 Zagreb Open – Men's doubles =

Men's doubles
- 2025 Zagreb Open

Final
- Champions: (Croatia) Matej Dodig (Croatia) Nino Serdarušić
- Runners-up: (Croatia) Luka Mikrut (Croatia) Mili Poljičak
- Score: 6–4, 6–4

Events
Singles	men	women
Doubles	men	women
- Zagreb Open

Jonathan Eysseric and Quentin Halys were the defending champions but chose not to defend their title.

Matej Dodig and Nino Serdarušić won the title after defeating Luka Mikrut and Mili Poljičak 6–4, 6–4 in the final.

== Seeds ==
1. (Ukraine) Denys Molchanov / (Czech Republic) Matěj Vocel (quarterfinals)
2. (Finland) Patrik Niklas-Salminen / (Poland) Szymon Walków (first round)
3. (Serbia) Ivan Sabanov / (Serbia) Matej Sabanov (semifinals)
4. (United States) Mac Kiger / (Canada) Benjamin Sigouin (first round)

== Draw ==
Key

- Q = Qualifier
- WC = Wild card
- LL = Lucky loser
- Alt = Alternate
- ITF = ITF entry
- PR = Protected ranking
- SR = Special ranking
- SE = Special exempt
- JE = Junior exempt
- JR = Junior Accelerator Programme entrant
- CO = College Accelerator Programme entrant
- NG = Next Gen Accelerator Program entrant
- w/o = Walkover
- r = Retired
- d = Defaulted

=== Draw ===
First round
1	(Ukraine) D Molchanov (Czech Republic) M Vocel	6	6
WC	(Croatia) Roko Horvat (Croatia) Vito Horvat	3	3
(Peru) G Bueno (Kazakhstan) D Popko	2	1
WC	(Croatia) M Dodig (Croatia) N Serdarušić	6	6
3	(Serbia) I Sabanov (Serbia) M Sabanov	6	6
(Turkey) E Kırkın (France) L Pavlovic	3	4
(Czech Republic) J Jermář (Serbia) S Latinović	2	7^{7}	[8]
(Norway) V Durasovic (Poland) D Michalski	6	6^{4}	[10]
(Bosnia and Herzegovina) M Bašić (Bosnia and Herzegovina) N Fatić	6	7^{7}
(United Kingdom) T Hands (United Kingdom) M Whitehouse	4	6^{2}
(Poland) S Kielan (Poland) F Pieczonka	6	6
4	(United States) M Kiger (Canada) B Sigouin	4	2
(Slovakia) M Karol (Czech Republic) A Paulson	6	7^{8}
Alt	(Ukraine) N Mashtakov (Serbia) Stefan Popović	4	6^{6}
(Croatia) L Mikrut (Croatia) M Poljičak	6	7
2	(Finland) P Niklas-Salminen (Poland) S Walków	2	5

Quarterfinals
1	(Ukraine) D Molchanov (Czech Republic) M Vocel	6^{7}	2
WC	(Croatia) M Dodig (Croatia) N Serdarušić	7^{9}	6
3	(Serbia) I Sabanov (Serbia) M Sabanov	7^{7}	4	[10]
(Norway) V Durasovic (Poland) D Michalski	6^{3}	6	[8]
(Bosnia and Herzegovina) M Bašić (Bosnia and Herzegovina) N Fatić	6	6
(Poland) S Kielan (Poland) F Pieczonka	4	3
(Slovakia) M Karol (Czech Republic) A Paulson	1	4
(Croatia) L Mikrut (Croatia) M Poljičak	6	6

Semifinals
WC	(Croatia) M Dodig (Croatia) N Serdarušić	6	7^{7}
3	(Serbia) I Sabanov (Serbia) M Sabanov	4	6^{1}
(Bosnia and Herzegovina) M Bašić (Bosnia and Herzegovina) N Fatić	6^{5}	6^{7}
(Croatia) L Mikrut (Croatia) M Poljičak	7^{7}	7^{9}

Final
WC	(Croatia) M Dodig (Croatia) N Serdarušić	6	6
(Croatia) L Mikrut (Croatia) M Poljičak	4	4
