= 2022 Zagreb Open – Doubles =

Doubles
- 2022 Zagreb Open

Final
- Champions: (Czech Republic) Adam Pavlásek (Slovakia) Igor Zelenay
- Runners-up: (Croatia) Domagoj Bilješko; Andrey Chepelev
- Score: 4–6, 6–3, [10–2]

Events
Singles	Doubles
- Zagreb Open

Evan King and Hunter Reese were the defending champions but chose not to defend their title.

Adam Pavlásek and Igor Zelenay won the title after defeating Domagoj Bilješko and Andrey Chepelev 4–6, 6–3, [10–2] in the final.

== Seeds ==
1. (Kazakhstan) Aleksandr Nedovyesov / (Pakistan) Aisam-ul-Haq Qureshi (quarterfinals)
2. (Poland) Karol Drzewiecki / (United States) Alex Lawson (quarterfinals)
3. (India) Sriram Balaji / (India) Jeevan Nedunchezhiyan (first round)
4. (Czech Republic) Adam Pavlásek / (Slovakia) Igor Zelenay (champions)

== Draw ==
Key

- Q = Qualifier
- WC = Wild card
- LL = Lucky loser
- Alt = Alternate
- ITF = ITF entry
- PR = Protected ranking
- SR = Special ranking
- SE = Special exempt
- JE = Junior exempt
- JR = Junior Accelerator Programme entrant
- CO = College Accelerator Programme entrant
- NG = Next Gen Accelerator Program entrant
- w/o = Walkover
- r = Retired
- d = Defaulted

First round
1	(Kazakhstan) A Nedovyesov (Pakistan) A-u-H Qureshi	6	6
(Chile) Miguel Fernando Pereira (Brazil) Gabriel Roveri Sidney	3	2
(Croatia) D Ajduković (Bosnia and Herzegovina) A Šetkić	1	3
Alt	(Croatia) Domagoj Bilješko; Andrey Chepelev	6	6
3	(India) S Balaji (India) J Nedunchezhiyan	6	6^{4}	[9]
WC	(Croatia) Z Babić (Bulgaria) A Donski	2	7^{7}	[11]
(Poland) P Matuszewski (Austria) D Pichler	6	3	[6]
(India) A Chandrasekar (India) VS Prashanth	2	6	[10]
(United Kingdom) S Duncan (Netherlands) M Vervoort	3	5
(Austria) L Miedler (Austria) M Neuchrist	6	7
(Netherlands) M Hermans (Netherlands) G Smits	3	7	[6]
4	(Czech Republic) A Pavlásek (Slovakia) I Zelenay	6	5	[10]
(Turkey) T Altuna (Croatia) F Ninčević	3	0
WC	(Croatia) M Poljičak (Croatia) A Šančić	6	6
PR	(China) Y Wu (China) Zh Zhang	6^{5}	7^{8}	[8]
2	(Poland) K Drzewiecki (United States) A Lawson	7^{7}	6^{6}	[10]

Quarterfinals
1	(Kazakhstan) A Nedovyesov (Pakistan) A-u-H Qureshi	6^{2}	6	[7]
Alt	(Croatia) D Bilješko; A Chepelev	7^{7}	2	[10]
WC	(Croatia) Z Babić (Bulgaria) A Donski	2^{r}
(India) A Chandrasekar (India) VS Prashanth	5
(Austria) L Miedler (Austria) M Neuchrist	1	4
4	(Czech Republic) A Pavlásek (Slovakia) I Zelenay	6	6
WC	(Croatia) M Poljičak (Croatia) A Šančić	3	6	[10]
2	(Poland) K Drzewiecki (United States) A Lawson	6	0	[7]

Semifinals
Alt	(Croatia) D Bilješko; A Chepelev	2	6	[12]
(India) A Chandrasekar (India) VS Prashanth	6	3	[10]
4	(Czech Republic) A Pavlásek (Slovakia) I Zelenay	7^{7}	2	[11]
WC	(Croatia) M Poljičak (Croatia) A Šančić	6^{2}	6	[9]

Final
Alt	(Croatia) D Bilješko; A Chepelev	6	3	[2]
4	(Czech Republic) A Pavlásek (Slovakia) I Zelenay	4	6	[10]
