= 2021 Zagreb Open =

Croatian tennis tournament

- Date: 10–16 May 2021
- Edition: 17th
- Surface: Clay
- Location: Zagreb, Croatia

Champions

Singles
- (Argentina) Sebastián Báez

Doubles
- (United States) Evan King / (United States) Hunter Reese
← 2011 ·	Zagreb Open	· 2022 →

The 2021 Zagreb Open was a professional tennis tournament played on clay courts. It was part of the 2021 ATP Challenger Tour. It took place in Zagreb, Croatia between 10 and 16 May 2021.

== Singles main-draw entrants ==
=== Seeds ===
Country	Player	Rank^{1}	Seed
ARG	Federico Coria	92	1
ESP	Pedro Martínez	95	2
SVK	Andrej Martin	109	3
JPN	Yasutaka Uchiyama	110	4
POR	Pedro Sousa	113	5
FRA	Benjamin Bonzi	115	6
BIH	Damir Džumhur	118	7
BRA	Thiago Seyboth Wild	126	8

- Rankings are as of 3 May 2021.

=== Other entrants ===
The following players received wildcards into the singles main draw:

- (Croatia) Borna Gojo
- (Croatia) Nino Serdarušić
- (Croatia) Antun Vidak

The following player received entry into the singles main draw as an alternate:

- (Kazakhstan) Dmitry Popko

The following players received entry from the qualifying draw:

- (Argentina) Sebastián Báez
- (Chile) Marcelo Tomás Barrios Vera
- (Latvia) Ernests Gulbis
- (India) Ramkumar Ramanathan

== Champions ==
=== Singles ===
- (Argentina) Sebastián Báez def. (Peru) Juan Pablo Varillas 3–6, 6–3, 6–1.

=== Doubles ===
- (United States) Evan King / (United States) Hunter Reese def. (Kazakhstan) Andrey Golubev / (Kazakhstan) Aleksandr Nedovyesov 6–2, 7–6^{(7–4)}.
