= 2026 De Wave Open Challenger =

- Date: 21 – 27 September
- Edition: 1st
- Surface: Clay
- Location: Genoa, Italy

Champions

Singles
- (Croatia) Luka Mikrut

Doubles
- (Spain) Íñigo Cervantes / (Ukraine) Denys Molchanov
- De Wave Open Challenger

The 2026 De Wave Open Challenger was a professional tennis tournament played on clay courts. It was the first edition of the tournament which was part of the 2026 ATP Challenger Tour. It took place in Genoa, Italy between 21 and 27 September 2026.

== Singles main-draw entrants ==
=== Seeds ===
Country	Player	Rank^{1}	Seed
ITA	Stefano Travaglia	158	1
GER	Tom Gentzsch	166	2
AUT	Lukas Neumayer	180	3
ITA	Francesco Passaro	201	4
ITA	Gianluca Cadenasso	217	5
BEL	Kimmer Coppejans	223	6
ITA	Raúl Brancaccio	225	7
GBR	Jay Clarke	232	8

- ^{1} Rankings are as of 14 September 2026.

=== Other entrants ===
The following players received wildcards into the singles main draw:

- (Italy) Federico Arnaboldi
- (Italy) Giuseppe La Vela
- (Italy) Samuele Pieri

The following player received entry into the singles main draw as a special exempt:

- (Italy) Carlo Alberto Caniato

The following player received entry into the singles main draw through the Next Gen Accelerator programme:

- (Germany) Mika Petkovic

The following players received entry into the singles main draw as alternates:

- (Czech Republic) Matthew William Donald
- (Italy) Francesco Forti
- (Italy) Juan Cruz Martin Manzano

The following players received entry from the qualifying draw:

- (Italy) Lorenzo Berto
- (Italy) Stefano D'Agostino
- (Italy) Federico Iannaccone
- (Spain) Alejandro Juan Mano
- (Italy) Giovanni Oradini
- (Germany) John Sperle

The following player received entry as a lucky loser:

- (Netherlands) Ryan Nijboer

== Champions ==
=== Singles ===
- (Croatia) Luka Mikrut def. (Italy) Carlo Alberto Caniato 6–4, 7–5.

=== Doubles ===
- (Spain) Íñigo Cervantes / (Ukraine) Denys Molchanov def. (Finland) Patrik Niklas-Salminen / (Czech Republic) Michael Vrbenský 6–2, 6–7^{(6–8)}, [10–7].
