= 2025 Braga Open – Singles =

Singles
- 2025 Braga Open

Final
- Champion: (Croatia) Luka Mikrut
- Runner-up: (Lithuania) Vilius Gaubas
- Score: 6–3, 6–4

Events
Singles	Doubles
- Braga Open

Elmer Møller was the defending champion but lost in the quarterfinals to Alejandro Moro Cañas.

Luka Mikrut won the title after defeating Vilius Gaubas 6–3, 6–4 in the final.

== Seeds ==
1. (Spain) Carlos Taberner (second round)
2. (Spain) Roberto Carballés Baena (second round, retired)
3. (Peru) Ignacio Buse (withdrew)
4. (Denmark) Elmer Møller (quarterfinals)
5. (Portugal) Jaime Faria (second round)
6. (Serbia) Dušan Lajović (second round)
7. (Italy) Andrea Pellegrino (first round)
8. (Argentina) Marco Trungelliti (quarterfinals)

== Draw ==
Key

- Q = Qualifier
- WC = Wild card
- LL = Lucky loser
- Alt = Alternate
- ITF = ITF entry
- PR = Protected ranking
- SR = Special ranking
- SE = Special exempt
- JE = Junior exempt
- JR = Junior Accelerator Programme entrant
- CO = College Accelerator Programme entrant
- NG = Next Gen Accelerator Program entrant
- w/o = Walkover
- r = Retired
- d = Defaulted

=== Finals ===
Semifinals
(Czech Republic) Zdeněk Kolář	4	4
(Lithuania) Vilius Gaubas	6	6
(Spain) Alejandro Moro Cañas	6	0	3
(Croatia) Luka Mikrut	4	6	6

Final
(Lithuania) Vilius Gaubas	3	4
(Croatia) Luka Mikrut	6	6

=== Top half ===
First round
1	(Spain) C Taberner	7	6
(Brazil) T Seyboth Wild	5	4
LL	(Spain) J Barranco Cosano	6	6
WC	(Portugal) Pedro Araújo	0	3
LL	(Netherlands) M Houkes	0^{r}
(Czech Republic) Z Kolář	5
(Italy) S Travaglia	5	6^{6}
5	(Portugal) J Faria	7	7^{8}
Q	(France) Lilian Marmousez	6^{6}	6	5
(Italy) M Cecchinato	7^{8}	4	7
Q	(Belgium) B Gadamauri	7^{7}	4	4
(Lithuania) V Gaubas	6^{5}	6	6
(Brazil) T Monteiro	7^{9}	3	4
Q	(Germany) H Squire	6^{7}	6	6
WC	(Portugal) T Pereira	1	1
8	(Argentina) M Trungelliti	6	6

Second round
1	(Spain) C Taberner	4	2
LL	(Spain) J Barranco Cosano	6	6
(Czech Republic) Z Kolář	6	6
5	(Portugal) J Faria	1	2
(Italy) M Cecchinato	4	7^{7}	3
(Lithuania) V Gaubas	6	6^{3}	6
Q	(Germany) H Squire	3	6	3
8	(Argentina) M Trungelliti	6	2	6

Quarterfinals
LL	(Spain) J Barranco Cosano	6	5	1
(Czech Republic) Z Kolář	2	7	6
(Lithuania) V Gaubas	6	3	7
8	(Argentina) M Trungelliti	3	6	5

Semifinals
(Czech Republic) Z Kolář	4	4
(Lithuania) V Gaubas	6	6

=== Bottom half ===
First round
7	(Italy) A Pellegrino	4	4
Q	(Denmark) J Ingildsen	6	6
WC	(Portugal) Francisco Rocha	2	6^{4}
(Spain) A Moro Cañas	6	7^{7}
(United Kingdom) J Clarke	5	4
(Portugal) H Rocha	7	6
(Sweden) E Ymer	2
4	(Denmark) E Møller	1^{r}
6	(Serbia) D Lajović	6	7
(Spain) D Rincón	4	5
(Croatia) L Mikrut	7^{7}	6
(Austria) J Schwärzler	6^{3}	2
(Portugal) F Ferreira Silva	1	4
Q	(India) S Nagal	6	6
Q	(Portugal) T Torres	1	3
2	(Spain) R Carballés Baena	6	6

Second round
Q	(Denmark) J Ingildsen	1	2
(Spain) A Moro Cañas	6	6
(Portugal) H Rocha	7^{7}	3	1
4	(Denmark) E Møller	6^{2}	6	6
6	(Serbia) D Lajović	3	3
(Croatia) L Mikrut	6	6
Q	(India) S Nagal	5	4
2	(Spain) R Carballés Baena	7	1^{r}

Quarterfinals
(Spain) A Moro Cañas	7	6
4	(Denmark) E Møller	5	4
(Croatia) L Mikrut	5	6	7^{10}
Q	(India) S Nagal	7	1	6^{8}

Semifinals
(Spain) A Moro Cañas	6	0	3
(Croatia) L Mikrut	4	6	6
