= Giorgia Pedone =

Italian tennis player (born 2004)

- Country (sports): Italy
- Born: 31 August 2004 (age 22) Palermo
- Plays: Right-handed
- Prize money: $196,003

Singles
- Career record: 132–97
- Career titles: 5 ITF
- Highest ranking: No. 183 (7 October 2024)
- Current ranking: No. 352 (20 October 2025)

Grand Slam singles results
- Australian Open: Q1 (2025)
- US Open: Q1 (2025)

Doubles
- Career record: 51–46
- Career titles: 5 ITF
- Highest ranking: No. 416 (1 April 2024)
- Current ranking: No. 558 (20 October 2025)
- Last updated on: 20 October 2025.

Giorgia Pedone (born 31 August 2004) is an Italian tennis player.

Pedone has a career-high singles ranking by the WTA of No. 183, achieved on 7 October 2024. She also has a career-high doubles ranking of world No. 416, achieved on 1 April 2024.

== Career ==
Pedone made her WTA Tour main-draw debut at the 2023 Palermo Ladies Open, partnering with Nuria Brancaccio.

She received a wildcard for the singles main draw at the 2024 Italian Open, losing in the first round to Rebecca Šramková. The following week at the 2024 Emilia-Romagna Open, Pedone defeated Alycia Parks to reach the second round, where she lost to fourth seed and eventual champion, Anna Karolína Schmiedlová.

Pedone was given a wildcard into the main draw at the 2025 Italian Open, but as with the previous year, she lost in the first round, this time to Lulu Sun.

== ITF Circuit finals ==
=== Singles: 15 (7 titles, 8 runner-ups) ===
| Legend W60 tournaments (0–1) W50 tournaments (1–1) W25/35 tournaments (6–5) W15 tournaments (0–1) | Finals by surface Clay (7–7) Carpet (0–1) |

| Result | W–L | Date | Tournament | Tier | Surface | Opponent | Score |
|---|---|---|---|---|---|---|---|
| Loss | 0–1 | Jun 2023 | Roma Cup, Italy | W60 | Clay | (Croatia) Petra Marčinko | 2–6, 2–6 |
| Win | 1–1 | Oct 2023 | ITF Santa Margherita di Pula, Italy | W25 | Clay | (Spain) Ane Mintegi del Olmo | 6–2, 7–5 |
| Win | 2–1 | Aug 2024 | Zagreb Open, Croatia | W50 | Clay | (Russia) Elena Pridankina | 2–6, 6–2, 7–5 |
| Loss | 2–2 | Aug 2024 | ITF São Paulo, Brazil | W35 | Clay | (Brazil) Luiza Fullana | 0–6, 2–2 ret. |
| Win | 3–2 | Sep 2024 | ITF Piracicaba, Brazil | W35 | Clay | (Argentina) Jazmín Ortenzi | 6–4, 6–2 |
| Win | 4–2 | Sep 2024 | ITF Leme, Brazil | W35 | Clay | (Italy) Aurora Zantedeschi | 6–2, 6–3 |
| Loss | 4–3 | Sep 2024 | ITF San Miguel de Tucumán, Argentina | W50 | Clay | (Argentina) Solana Sierra | 2–6, 2–6 |
| Loss | 4–4 | Nov 2024 | ITF Solarino, Italy | W35 | Carpet | (Chinese Taipei) Joanna Garland | 2–6, 3–6 |
| Win | 5–4 | May 2025 | ITF Bol, Croatia | W35 | Clay | (Russia) Anastasia Gasanova | 1–6, 6–4, 7–6^{(7)} |
| Loss | 5–5 | Jun 2025 | Roma Cup, Italy | W35 | Clay | (Italy) Dalila Spiteri | 3–6, 5–7 |
| Loss | 5–6 | Oct 2025 | ITF Santa Margherita di Pula, Italy | W35 | Clay | (Italy) Lisa Pigato | 1–6, 4–6 |
| Loss | 5–7 | Feb 2026 | ITF Antalya, Turkiye | W15 | Clay | (Croatia) Tena Lukas | 1–6, 4–6 |
| Win | 6–7 | Apr 2026 | ITF Santa Margherita di Pula, Italy | W35 | Clay | (Italy) Deborah Chiesa | 6–4, 6–1 |
| Win | 7–7 | Aug 2026 | ITF Chacabuco, Argentina | W35 | Clay | (Mexico) Ana Sofía Sánchez | 6–4, 3–6, 6–0 |
| Loss | 7–8 | Aug 2026 | Serbian Tennis Tour, Serbia | W35 | Clay | Ksenia Zaytseva | 4–6, 3–6 |

=== Doubles: 13 (8 titles, 5 runner-ups) ===
| Legend W50 tournaments (0–1) W25/35 tournaments (4–3) W15 tournaments (4–1) | Finals by surface Clay (6–4) Carpet (2–1) |

| Result | W–L | Date | Tournament | Tier | Surface | Partner | Opponents | Score |
|---|---|---|---|---|---|---|---|---|
| Win | 1–0 | Nov 2021 | ITF Solarino, Italy | W15 | Carpet | (Italy) Virginia Ferrara | (Sweden) Jacqueline Cabaj Awad (Australia) Alicia Smith | 6–1, 1–6, [10–5] |
| Win | 2–0 | Aug 2022 | ITF Padova, Italy | W15 | Clay | (Italy) Virginia Ferrara | (Italy) Jessica Bertoldo (Italy) Enola Chiesa | 6–3, 6–4 |
| Win | 3–0 | Nov 2022 | ITF Solarino, Italy | W15 | Carpet | (Italy) Virginia Ferrara | (Netherlands) Lian Tran (Uzbekistan) Sevil Yuldasheva | 6–3, 6–2 |
| Loss | 3–1 | Mar 2023 | ITF Antalya, Turkey | W15 | Clay | (Italy) Virginia Ferrara | (Brazil) Ana Candiotto; Daria Lodikova | 4–6, 4–6 |
| Loss | 3–2 | Oct 2023 | ITF Solarino, Italy | W25 | Carpet | (Italy) Lisa Pigato | (United States) Jessie Aney (Germany) Lena Papadakis | 3–6, 6–3, [6–10] |
| Loss | 3–3 | Aug 2024 | ITF São Paulo, Brazil | W35 | Clay | (Italy) Aurora Zantedeschi | (United States) Jaeda Daniel; Anastasiia Grechkina | w/o |
| Win | 4–3 | Jun 2025 | Rome Cup, Italy | W35 | Clay | (Italy) Noemi Basiletti | (Italy) Francesca Pace (Italy) Sofia Rocchetti | 6–3, 6–1 |
| Win | 5–3 | Sep 2025 | ITF Santa Margherita di Pula, Italy | W35 | Clay | (Italy) Noemi Basiletti | (Italy) Marta Lombardini (Italy) Jennifer Ruggeri | 6–2, 6–7^{(6)}, [10–8] |
| Win | 6–3 | Feb 2026 | ITF Antalya, Turkiye | W15 | Clay | (Italy) Aurora Zantedeschi | (China) Huang Yujia (Japan) Nanari Katsumi | 6–2, 3–6, [10–4] |
| Win | 7–3 | Apr 2026 | ITF Santa Margherita di Pula, Italy | W35 | Clay | (Italy) Deborah Chiesa | (France) Séléna Janicijevic (Serbia) Natalija Senić | 7–6^{(8)}, 6–3 |
| Loss | 7–4 | Jul 2026 | ITF São Paulo, Brazil | W35 | Clay | (Mexico) Ana Sofía Sánchez | Daria Egorova (Mexico) Marian Gómez Pezuela Cano | 2–6, 4–6 |
| Win | 8–4 | Oct 2026 | ITF Santa Margherita di Pula, Italy | W35 | Clay | (Sweden) Lisa Zaar | (France) Nina Radovanovic (Serbia) Natalija Senić | 7–6^{(6)}, 6–7^{(3)}, [10–4] |
| Loss | 8–5 | Nov 2026 | ITF Heraklion, Greece | W50 | Clay | (Italy) Deborah Chiesa | (Germany) Joëlle Steur (Netherlands) Sarah van Emst | 0–6, 2–6 |
