= De Wave Open Challenger =

- 2026 De Wave Open Challenger

ATP Challenger Tour
- Location: Genoa, Italy
- Category: ATP Challenger Tour
- Surface: Clay

The De Wave Open Challenger is a professional tennis tournament played on clay courts. It is currently part of the ATP Challenger Tour. It was first held in Genoa, Italy in 2026.

== Past finals ==
=== Singles ===
Year	Champion	Runner-up	Score
2026	(Croatia) Luka Mikrut	(Italy) Carlo Alberto Caniato	6–4, 7–5

=== Doubles ===
Year	Champions	Runners-up	Score
2026	(Spain) Íñigo Cervantes (Ukraine) Denys Molchanov	(Finland) Patrik Niklas-Salminen (Czech Republic) Michael Vrbenský	6–2, 6–7^{(6–8)}, [10–7]
