= 2022 Zagreb Open =

- Date: 9–14 May 2022
- Edition: 18th
- Surface: Clay
- Location: Zagreb, Croatia

Champions

Singles
- (Austria) Filip Misolic

Doubles
- (Czech Republic) Adam Pavlásek / (Slovakia) Igor Zelenay
← 2021 ·	Zagreb Open	· 2024 →

The 2022 Zagreb Open was a professional tennis tournament played on clay courts. It was part of the 2022 ATP Challenger Tour. It took place in Zagreb, Croatia between 9 and 14 May 2022.

== Singles main-draw entrants ==
=== Seeds ===
Country	Player	Rank^{1}	Seed
AUS	Jordan Thompson	87	1
AUS	Aleksandar Vukic	128	2
AUS	Christopher O'Connell	129	3
~~BIH~~	~~Damir Džumhur~~	~~162~~	~~4~~
CZE	Vít Kopřiva	167	5
AUS	Jason Kubler	173	6
ARG	Juan Pablo Ficovich	182	7
ITA	Federico Gaio	183	8

- Rankings are as of 2 May 2022.

=== Other entrants ===
The following players received wildcards into the singles main draw:

- (North Macedonia) Kalin Ivanovski
- (Croatia) Mili Poljičak
- (Croatia) Dino Prižmić

The following players received entry into the singles main draw as alternates:

- (Croatia) Duje Ajduković
- (Hungary) ~~Attila Balázs~~
- (Italy) Riccardo Bonadio

The following players received entry from the qualifying draw:

- (Bosnia and Herzegovina) Nerman Fatić
- (Spain) Carlos Gimeno Valero
- (Hungary) Fábián Marozsán
- (Austria) Filip Misolic
- (Austria) Maximilian Neuchrist
- (China) Wu Yibing

The following players received entry as lucky losers:

- (France) Tristan Lamasine
- (China) Shang Juncheng
- (China) Zhang Zhizhen

== Champions ==
=== Singles ===
- (Austria) Filip Misolic def. (Croatia) Mili Poljičak 6–3, 7–6^{(8–6)}.

=== Doubles ===
- (Czech Republic) Adam Pavlásek / (Slovakia) Igor Zelenay def. (Croatia) Domagoj Bilješko / Andrey Chepelev 4–6, 6–3, [10–2].
