= Mateja Kraljevic =

Swiss tennis player

- Country (sports): Switzerland
- Born: 1 September 1993 (age 32) Menziken, Aargau, Switzerland
- Plays: Right-handed

Singles
- Highest ranking: No. 1206 (19 December 2011)

Doubles
- Career titles: 1 ITF
- Highest ranking: No. 1050 (23 May 2011)

Mateja Kraljevic (born 1 September 1993) is a Swiss former professional tennis player.

== Biography ==
Born in Menziken, Kraljevic represented Switzerland in a 2009 Fed Cup tie against Australia in Mildura, as a 15 year old. She appeared in both a singles and doubles match, which were both dead rubbers. In the singles she upset her much higher ranked opponent Jessica Moore in three sets, then partnered with Amra Sadiković in the doubles against Jelena Dokic and Rennae Stubbs, which was abandoned midway through the second set due to bad light.

Kraljevic, a right-handed player, won her only ITF title in the doubles at Šibenik in 2011, which was her final year on tour. She gave up on tennis to complete her schooling and went on study medicine.

== ITF finals ==
=== Doubles: 1 (1–0) ===
Outcome	Date	Tournament	Surface	Partner	Opponents	Score
Winner	4 April 2011	Šibenik, Croatia	Clay	(Switzerland) Amra Sadiković	(Czech Republic) Simona Dobrá (Czech Republic) Tereza Hladíková	7–5, 6–3

== See also ==
- List of Switzerland Fed Cup team representatives
