= Zvonimir Babić =

Croatian tennis player (born 1995)

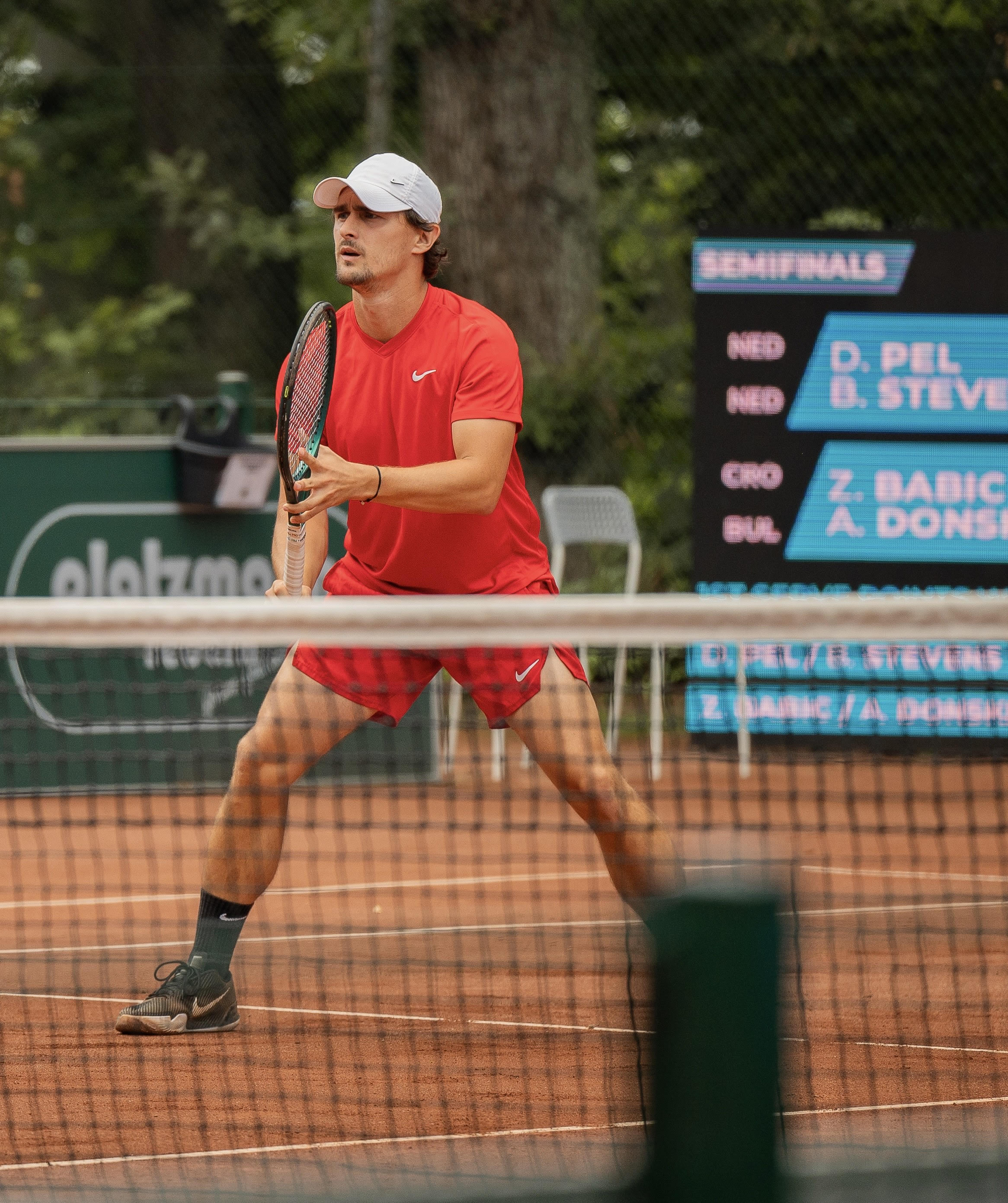
- Zvonimir Babić at the 2024 Platzmann-Sauerland Open
- Country (sports): Croatia
- Born: 22 October 1995 (age 30) Zagreb, Croatia
- Height: 1.75 m (5 ft 9 in)
- Plays: Right-handed (two-handed backhand)
- College: University of Mississippi
- Prize money: $31,180

Singles
- Career record: 0–0 (at ATP Tour level, Grand Slam level, and in Davis Cup)
- Career titles: 0

Doubles
- Career record: 0–1 (at ATP Tour level, Grand Slam level, and in Davis Cup)
- Career titles: 4 ITF
- Highest ranking: No. 220 (17 July 2023)

Zvonimir Babić (born 22 October 1995) is a Croatian tennis player specializing in doubles.

Babić has a career high ATP doubles ranking of No. 220 achieved on 17 July 2023.

Babić made his ATP main draw debut at the 2023 Croatia Open Umag after receiving a wildcard into the doubles main draw with Luka Mikrut.

== College ==
Babić started professional career in 2021, after graduating from the University of Mississippi obtaining a master's degree in accounting. The Daily Mississippian wrote an article about Babić's transition from professional accounting to tennis. Tennis.legend social media account posted a video of Babić playing a college match vs Florida Gators' Oliver Crawford and the video quickly became viral. The video gained more than 500.000 views on Instagram/TikTok with more than 50.000 likes

== Challenger and World Tennis Tour finals ==
=== Doubles: 8 (4–4) ===
Legend ATP Challenger Tour (0–0) ITF World Tennis Tour (4–4)	Finals by surface Hard (0–2) Clay (3–2) Grass (0–0) Carpet (1–0)

Result	W–L	Date	Tournament	Tier	Surface	Partner	Opponents	Score
Loss	0–1	Mar 2021	M15 Rovinj, Croatia	World Tennis Tour	Clay	(Croatia) Josip Krstanović	(Italy) Marco Bortolotti (Romania) Victor Vlad Cornea	6–3, 3–6, [5–10]
Win	1–1	Apr 2021	M15 Šibenik, Croatia	World Tennis Tour	Clay	(Austria) David Pichler	(Croatia) Borna Devald (Croatia) Mili Poljičak	6–3, 6–4
Loss	1–2	Jan 2022	M25 Monastir, Tunisia	World Tennis Tour	Hard	(Bulgaria) Alexander Donski	(France) Théo Arribagé (France) Titouan Droguet	6–1, 4–6, [8–10]
Win	2–2	Mar 2022	M25 Opatija, Croatia	World Tennis Tour	Clay	(Greece) Petros Tsitsipas	(Italy) Riccardo Bonadio (Czech Republic) Michael Vrbenský	6–3, 4–6, [10–8]
Loss	2–3	Aug 2022	M25 Koksijde, Belgium	World Tennis Tour	Clay	(Sweden) Simon Freund	(Argentina) Hernán Casanova (Bolivia) Murkel Dellien	1–6, 6–4, [5–10]
Loss	2–4	Oct 2022	M25 Rodez, France	World Tennis Tour	Hard	(Australia) Brandon Walkin	(Netherlands) Mats Hermans (Netherlands) Mick Veldheer	3–6, 4–6
Win	3–4	Jan 2023	M25 Veigy-Foncenex, France	World Tennis Tour	Carpet	(Germany) Niklas Schell	(France) Tristan Lamasine (France) Matteo Martineau	6–4, 6–7^{(5–7)}, [10–8]
Win	4–4	May 2023	M15 Osijek, Croatia	World Tennis Tour	Clay	(Croatia) Luka Mikrut	(Croatia) Nikola Bašić (Russia) Pavel Verbin	3–6, 6–2, [10–7]
