= Luka Mikrut =

Croatian tennis player (born 2004)

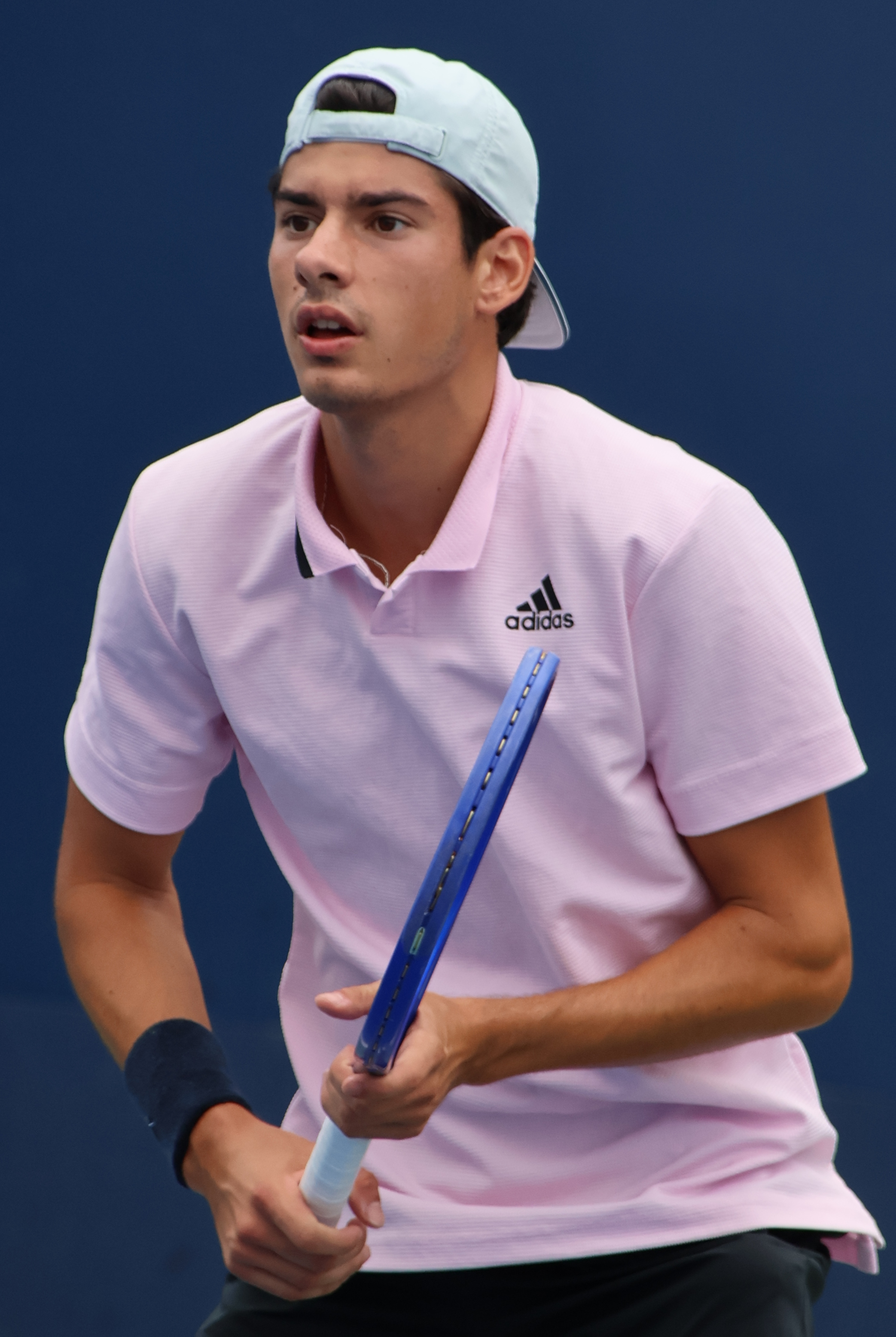
- Mikrut at the 2026 US Open
- Country (sports): Croatia
- Residence: Split, Croatia
- Born: 16 April 2004 (age 22) Split, Croatia
- Height: 1.88 m (6 ft 2 in)
- Plays: Right-handed (two-handed backhand)
- Coach: Alan Marić, Dino Cebo
- Prize money: US $278,657

Singles
- Career record: 0–1 (at ATP Tour level, Grand Slam level, and in Davis Cup)
- Career titles: 0
- Highest ranking: No. 159 (13 October 2025)
- Current ranking: No. 247 (16 November 2026)

Grand Slam singles results
- Australian Open: Q1 (2026)
- French Open: Q1 (2026)
- Wimbledon: Q1 (2026)
- US Open: Q2 (2026)

Doubles
- Career record: 0–2 (at ATP Tour level, Grand Slam level, and in Davis Cup)
- Career titles: 0
- Highest ranking: No. 264 (2 March 2026)
- Current ranking: No. 275 (31 August 2026)
- Last updated on: 31 August 2026.

Luka Mikrut (born 16 April 2004) is a Croatian tennis player. He has a career-high ATP singles ranking of world No. 159 achieved on 13 October 2025 and a doubles ranking of No. 264 achieved on 2 March 2026. He is currently the No. 5 singles player from Croatia.

== Career ==
Mikrut made his ATP main draw doubles debut at the 2023 Croatia Open Umag after receiving a wildcard into the doubles main draw with Zvonimir Babić.

For his singles debut, he received a wildcard for the main draw of the 2024 Croatia Open Umag where he lost to Camilo Ugo Carabelli.

== Performance timeline ==
Key
W	F	SF	QF	#R	RR	Q#	DNQ	A	NH

(W) winner; (F) finalist; (SF) semifinalist; (QF) quarterfinalist; (#R) rounds 4, 3, 2, 1; (RR) round-robin stage; (Q#) qualification round; (DNQ) did not qualify; (A) absent; (NH) not held; (SR) strike rate (events won / competed); (W–L) win–loss record.
To avoid confusion and double counting, these charts are updated at the conclusion of a tournament or when the player's participation has ended.

=== Singles ===
Tournament	2026	SR	W–L	Win %
Grand Slam tournaments
Australian Open	Q1	0 / 0	0–0	–
French Open		0 / 0	0–0	–
Wimbledon		0 / 0	0–0	–
US Open		0 / 0	0–0	–
Win–loss	0–0	0 / 0	0–0	–
ATP Masters 1000
Indian Wells Masters		0 / 0	0–0	–
Miami Open		0 / 0	0–0	–
Monte Carlo Masters		0 / 0	0–0	–
Madrid Open		0 / 0	0-0	–
Italian Open		0 / 0	0–0	–
Canadian Open		0 / 0	0–0	–
Cincinnati Masters		0 / 0	0–0	–
Shanghai Masters		0 / 0	0–0	–
Paris Masters		0 / 0	0–0	–
Win–loss	0–0	0 / 0	0–0	–

== ATP Challenger Tour finals ==
=== Singles: 6 (3 titles, 3 runner-ups) ===
Legend ATP Challenger Tour (3–3)

Result	W–L	Date	Tournament	Tier	Surface	Opponent	Score
Loss	0–1	Jun 2024	Zagreb Open, Croatia	Challenger	Clay	(Bosnia and Herzegovina) Damir Džumhur	5–7, 0–6
Win	1–1	Aug 2025	Città di Como Challenger, Italy	Challenger	Clay	(Croatia) Duje Ajduković	6–3, 7–5
Win	2–1	Sep 2025	Braga Open, Portugal	Challenger	Clay	(Lithuania) Vilius Gaubas	6–3, 6–4
Loss	2–2	Oct 2025	Copa Faulcombridge, Spain	Challenger	Clay	(United Kingdom) Jan Choinski	6–4, 1–6, 2–6
Loss	2–3	Jun 2026	Neckarcup 2.0, Germany	Challenger	Clay	(United States) Emilio Nava	walkover
Win	3–3	Sep 2026	De Wave Open Challenger, Italy	Challenger	Clay	(Italy) Carlo Alberto Caniato	6–4, 7–5

=== Doubles: 3 (3 runner-ups) ===
Legend ATP Challenger Tour (0–3)

Result	W–L	Date	Tournament	Tier	Surface	Partner	Opponents	Score
Loss	0–1	May 2025	Zagreb Open, Croatia	Challenger	Clay	(Croatia) Mili Poljičak	(Croatia) Matej Dodig (Croatia) Nino Serdarušić	4–6, 4–6
Loss	0–2	Oct 2025	Monastir Open, Tunisia	Challenger	Hard	(Serbia) Stefan Latinović	(France) Corentin Denolly (France) Max Westphal	5–7, 6–2, [6–10]
Loss	0–3	Feb 2026	Tenerife Challenger, Spain	Challenger	Hard	(Portugal) Tiago Pereira	(Czech Republic) Filip Duda (Czech Republic) David Poljak	6–7^{(0–7)}, 3–6

== ITF World Tennis Tour finals ==
=== Singles: 10 (6 titles, 4 runner-ups) ===
Legend ITF WTT (6–4)	Finals by surface Hard (0–1) Clay (6–3)

Result	W–L	Date	Tournament	Tier	Surface	Opponent	Score
Loss	0–1	Apr 2023	M25 Dubrovnik, Croatia	WTT	Clay	(Croatia) Duje Ajduković	3–6, 2–6
Loss	0–2	Jun 2023	M15 Sarajevo, Bosnia and Herzegovina	WTT	Clay	(Germany) Elmar Ejupovic	3–6, 3–6
Win	1–2	Aug 2023	M25 Osijek, Croatia	WTT	Clay	(Argentina) Valerio Aboian	6–4, 6–4
Loss	1–3	Jan 2024	M15 Manacor, Spain	WTT	Hard	Yaroslav Demin	3–6, 7–5, 3–6
Loss	1–4	Apr 2024	M15 Split, Croatia	WTT	Clay	(Czech Republic) Michael Vrbenský	5–7, 6–7^{(3–7)}
Win	2–4	May 2024	M15 Bol, Croatia	WTT	Clay	(France) Sascha Gueymard Wayenburg	6–3, 6–3
Win	3–4	Mar 2025	M15 Antalya, Turkiye	WTT	Clay	(Spain) Max Alcalá Gurri	6–3, 7–6^{(7–4)}
Win	4–4	Mar 2025	M15 Opatija, Croatia	WTT	Clay	(North Macedonia) Kalin Ivanovski	6–3, 7–6^{(7–4)}
Win	5–4	Apr 2025	M25 Antalya, Turkiye	WTT	Clay	(Poland) Daniel Michalski	6–2, 7–5
Win	6–4	Apr 2025	M15 Dubrovnik, Croatia	WTT	Clay	(Bosnia and Herzegovina) Nerman Fatić	6–2, 6–4

=== Doubles: 11 (9 titles, 2 runner-ups) ===
Legend ITF WTT (9–2)	Finals by surface Hard (0–0) Clay (9–2)

Result	W–L	Date	Tournament	Tier	Surface	Partner	Opponents	Score
Win	1–0	Apr 2022	M25 Split, Croatia	WTT	Clay	(Croatia) Mili Poljičak	(France) Théo Arribagé (France) Luca Sanchez	2–6, 6–4, [10–8]
Loss	1–1	May 2022	M25 Osijek, Croatia	WTT	Clay	(Croatia) Mili Poljičak	(India) Dev Javia (Slovakia) Lukáš Pokorný	6–7^{(3–7)}, 6–3, [8–10]
Win	2–1	Mar 2023	M15 Poreč, Croatia	WTT	Clay	(Italy) Gabriele Piraino	(Slovenia) Jan Kupčič (Slovenia) Maj Premzl	6–4, 3–6, [10–7]
Win	3–1	Mar 2023	M15 Rovinj, Croatia	WTT	Clay	(Serbia) Stefan Popović	(Ukraine) Igor Dudun (Ukraine) Artem Podorozhnyi	6–3, 6–1
Loss	3–2	Mar 2023	M15 Opatija, Croatia	WTT	Clay	(Serbia) Stefan Popović	(Ukraine) Viacheslav Bielinskyi (Ukraine) Oleksandr Ovcharenko	2–6, 4–6
Win	4–2	May 2023	M15 Osijek, Croatia	WTT	Clay	(Croatia) Zvonimir Babić	(Croatia) Nikola Bašić; Pavel Verbin	3–6, 6–2, [10–7]
Win	5–2	Aug 2023	M25 Osijek, Croatia	WTT	Clay	(Croatia) Matej Dodig	(Croatia) Marino Jakić (Serbia) Stefan Milićević	6–1, 6–2
Win	6–2	Sep 2023	M25 Maribor, Slovenia	WTT	Clay	(Croatia) Mili Poljičak	(Croatia) Nikola Bašić (Slovenia) Jan Kupčič	6–7^{(5–7)}, 6–1, [10–6]
Win	7–2	Mar 2024	M15 Poreč, Croatia	WTT	Clay	(Croatia) Alen Bill	(Croatia) Nikola Bašić (Croatia) Mili Poljičak	6–1, 7–5
Win	8–2	Mar 2024	M15 Rovinj, Croatia	WTT	Clay	(Croatia) Mili Poljičak	(Italy) Leonardo Rossi (Italy) Luigi Sorrentino	6–7^{(5–7)}, 7–5, [10–7]
Win	9–2	Mar 2024	M15 Opatija, Croatia	WTT	Clay	(Croatia) Mili Poljičak	(Italy) Tommaso Compagnucci (Italy) Luigi Sorrentino	6–4, 6–2
