= 2025 Zagreb Open =

- Date: 12–17 May
- Edition: 20th (men); 6th (women)
- Category: ATP Challenger Tour; ITF Women's World Tennis Tour
- Surface: Clay
- Location: Zagreb, Croatia

Champions

Men's singles
- (Croatia) Dino Prižmić

Women's singles
- (Croatia) Tara Würth

Men's doubles
- (Croatia) Matej Dodig / (Croatia) Nino Serdarušić

Women's doubles
- (Portugal) Francisca Jorge / (Portugal) Matilde Jorge
- Zagreb Open

The 2025 Zagreb Open was a professional tennis tournament played on outdoor clay courts. It was part of the 2025 ATP Challenger Tour and the 2025 ITF Women's World Tennis Tour. It took place in Zagreb, Croatia between 12 and 17 May 2025.

== Men's singles main-draw entrants ==
=== Seeds ===
| Country | Player | Rank^{1} | Seed |
|---|---|---|---|
| FRA | Adrian Mannarino | 126 | 1 |
| SUI | Jérôme Kym | 127 | 2 |
| CZE | Dalibor Svrčina | 128 | 3 |
| FRA | Harold Mayot | 144 | 4 |
| FRA | Kyrian Jacquet | 150 | 5 |
| KAZ | Dmitry Popko | 163 | 6 |
| CRO | Duje Ajduković | 175 | 7 |
| AUT | Filip Misolic | 180 | 8 |

- Rankings are as of 5 May 2025.

=== Other entrants ===
The following players received wildcards into the singles main draw:

- (Croatia) Matej Dodig
- (Croatia) Luka Mikrut
- (Croatia) Dino Prižmić

The following player received entry into the singles main draw using a protected ranking:

- (Belgium) Kimmer Coppejans

The following players received entry into the singles main draw as alternates:

- (Peru) Gonzalo Bueno
- (Netherlands) Max Houkes
- (Croatia) Mili Poljičak

The following players received entry from the qualifying draw:

- (Bosnia and Herzegovina) Mirza Bašić
- (Bosnia and Herzegovina) Nerman Fatić
- (Slovakia) Norbert Gombos
- (Slovakia) Miloš Karol
- (Bulgaria) Dimitar Kuzmanov
- (Austria) Neil Oberleitner

The following player received entry as a lucky loser:

- (France) Luka Pavlovic

== Women's singles main-draw entrants ==
=== Seeds ===
| Country | Player | Rank* | Seed |
|---|---|---|---|
| FRA | Léolia Jeanjean | 104 | 1 |
| CRO | Jana Fett | 149 | 2 |
| SLO | Tamara Zidanšek | 151 | 3 |
| SRB | Lola Radivojević | 175 | 4 |
| THA | Lanlana Tararudee | 197 | 5 |
| ~~ARG~~ | ~~Julia Riera~~ | ~~199~~ | ~~6~~ |
| FRA | Selena Janicijevic | 203 | 7 |
| CAN | Carson Branstine | 207 | 8 |

- Rankings are as of 5 May, 2025.

=== Other entrants ===
The following players received wildcards into the singles main draw:

- (Croatia) Lucija Ćirić Bagarić
- (Croatia) Ana Konjuh
- (Croatia) Tena Lukas
- (Croatia) Iva Primorac

The following players received entry from the qualifying draw:

- (Slovenia) Živa Falkner
- (Norway) Malene Helgø
- (Switzerland) Ylena In-Albon
- (Portugal) Matilde Jorge
- (Slovenia) Pia Lovrič
- (France) Alice Ramé
- (Serbia) Natalija Senić
- (Netherlands) Lian Tran

The following player received entry as a lucky loser:

- (Slovenia) Kristina Novak

== Champions ==
=== Men's singles ===
- (Croatia) Dino Prižmić def. (France) Luca Van Assche 6–2 retired.

=== Women's singles ===
- (Croatia) Tara Würth def. (Spain) Guiomar Maristany 6–2, 4–6, 6–3.

=== Men's doubles ===
- (Croatia) Matej Dodig / (Croatia) Nino Serdarušić def. (Croatia) Luka Mikrut / (Croatia) Mili Poljičak 6–4, 6–4.

=== Women's doubles ===
- (Portugal) Francisca Jorge / (Portugal) Matilde Jorge def. (Croatia) Lucija Ćirić Bagarić / Vitalia Diatchenko 6–2, 6–0.
