= Zagreb Open =

- 2025 Zagreb Open

Tournament information
- Event name: Zagreb Open
- Location: Zagreb, Croatia
- Venue: Sportski park Mladost (1996-2011); Tenis centar Maksimir (2021-2022); SRC Šalata (2024-)
- Surface: Clay
- Website: website
ATP Tour
- Category: ATP Challenger Tour
- Draw: 32S / 24Q / 16D
- Prize money: €91,250 (2026)
WTA Tour
- Category: ITF Women's World Tennis Tour
- Draw: 32S / 32Q / 16D
- Prize money: $60,000 (2026)

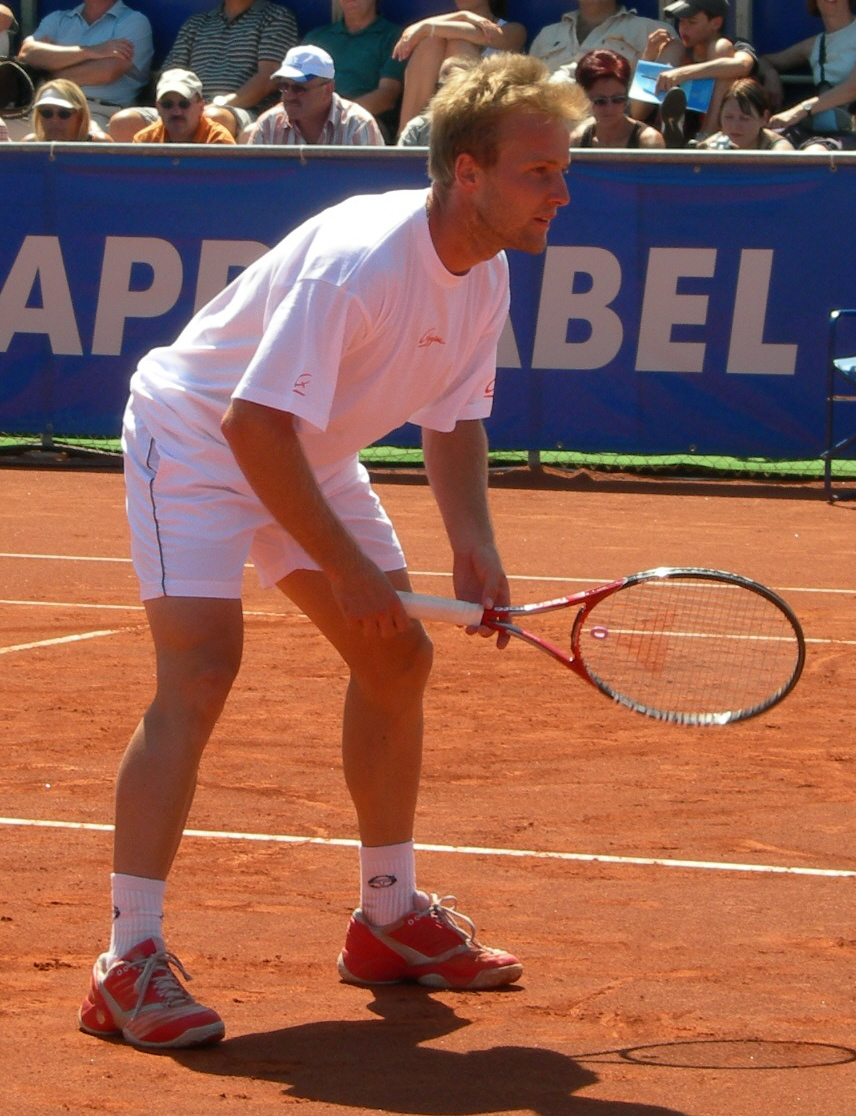
Belgian Christophe Rochus defeated Carlos Berlocq in the 2008 final

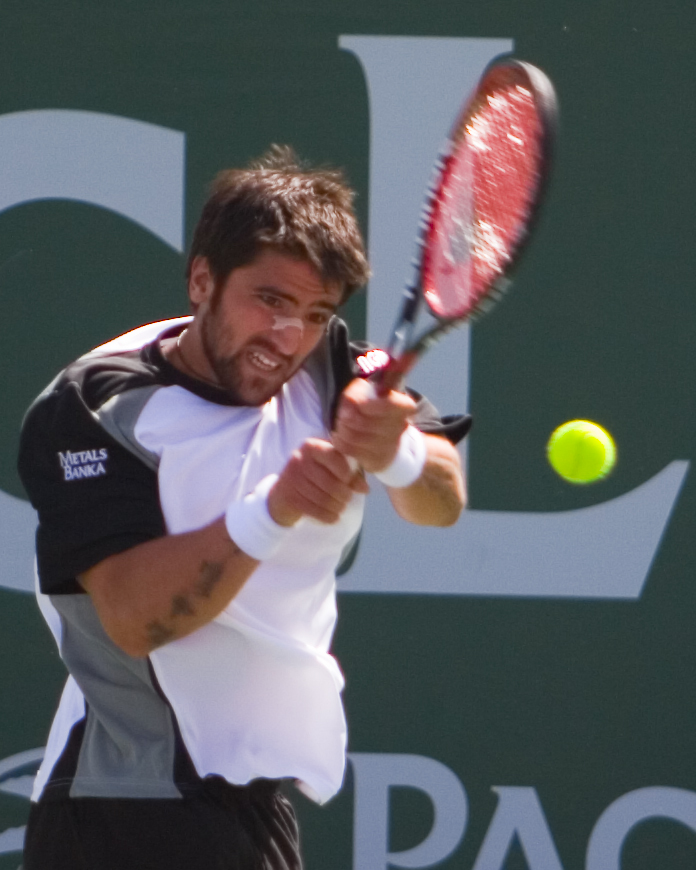
Janko Tipsarević from Serbia was the winner of the 2007 singles event

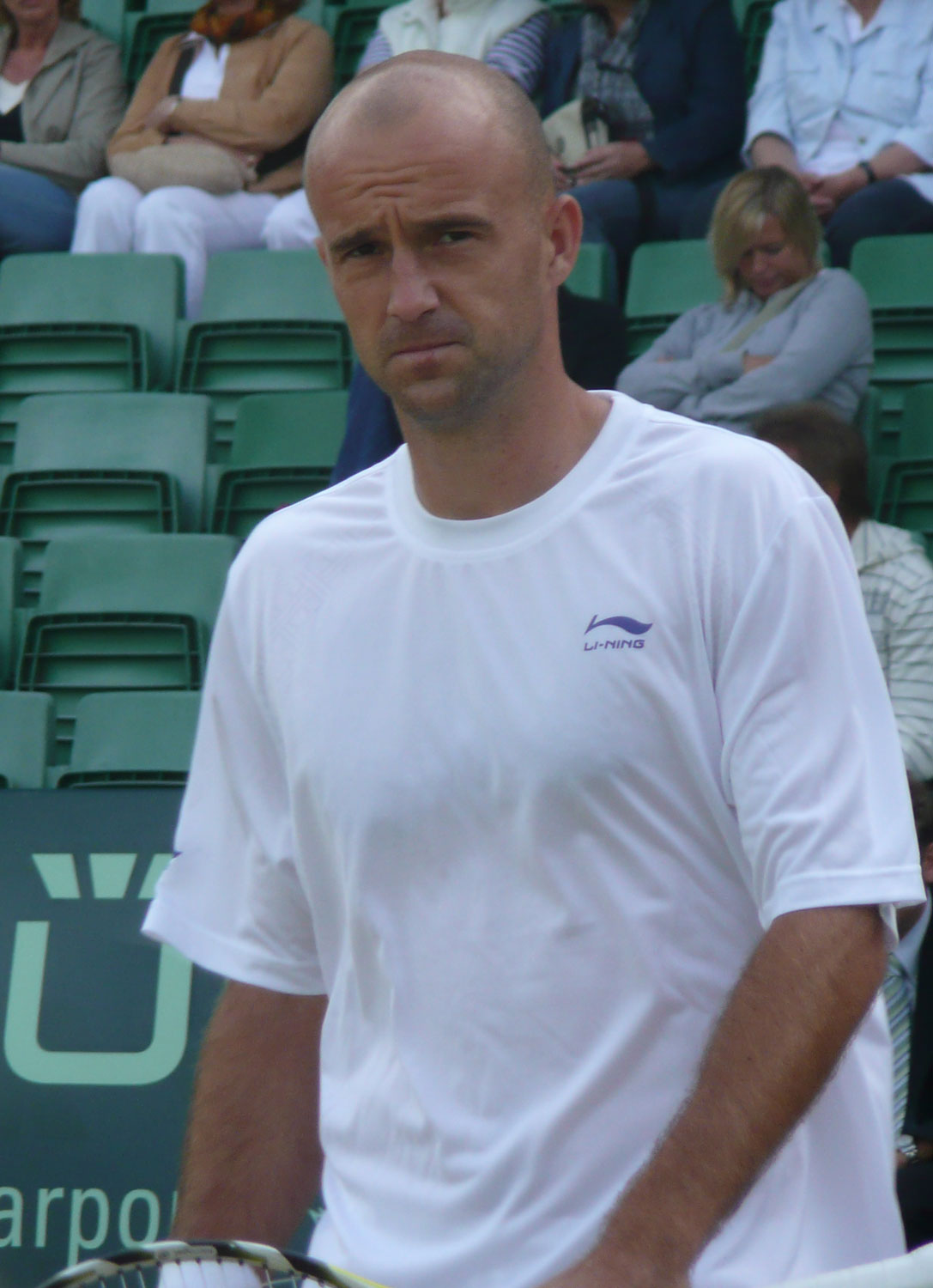
1997 singles runner-up and 1999 doubles champion Ivan Ljubičić was the first Croatian to win the singles title in 2005

The Zagreb Open is a professional tennis tournament played on outdoor red clay courts. It is part of the ATP Challenger Tour and of the ITF Women's World Tennis Tour. It was held annually at the Sportski park Mladost in Zagreb, Croatia, from 1996 to 2011. The men's tournament returned in 2021 and was played for two years at the Tenis centar Maksimir. After another break in 2023 the tournament moved in 2024 to the Sportsko rekreacijski centar Šalata. The women's tournament returned in 2024, played also at the SRC Šalata.

Tom Vanhoudt is the doubles record holder with two titles, along with Ágnes Szávay on the women's counterpart with one single and one doubles title.

== Past finals ==
=== Men ===
==== Singles ====
Year	Champion	Runner-up	Score
2026	(United Kingdom) Jan Choinski	(Hungary) Zsombor Piros	7–6^{(7–5)}, 7–6^{(7–2)}
2025	(Croatia) Dino Prižmić	(France) Luca Van Assche	6–2 ret.
2024	(Bosnia and Herzegovina) Damir Džumhur	(Croatia) Luka Mikrut	7–5, 6–0
2023	not held		
2022	(Austria) Filip Misolic	(Croatia) Mili Poljičak	6–3, 7–6^{(8–6)}
2021	(Argentina) Sebastián Báez	(Peru) Juan Pablo Varillas	3–6, 6–3, 6–1
2012–2020	not held		
2011	(Argentina) Diego Junqueira	(Brazil) João Souza	6–3, 6–4
2010	(Kazakhstan) Yuri Schukin	(Spain) Santiago Ventura	6–3, 7–5
2009	(Brazil) Marcos Daniel	(Belgium) Olivier Rochus	6–3, 6–4
2008	(Belgium) Christophe Rochus	(Argentina) Carlos Berlocq	6–3, 6–4
2007	(Serbia) Janko Tipsarević	(Brazil) Júlio Silva	3–6, 6–3, 6–3
2006	(Germany) Daniel Elsner	(Romania) Victor Crivoi	6–3, 7–6^{(7–3)}
2005	(Croatia) Ivan Ljubičić	(Czech Republic) Jan Minář	6–4, 6–2
2004	(Chile) Adrián García	(Spain) Rubén Ramírez Hidalgo	6–3, 7–5
2003	(Belgium) Kristof Vliegen	(Spain) Rubén Ramírez Hidalgo	6–1, 4–6, 6–0
2002	(Peru) Luis Horna	(Slovakia) Dominik Hrbatý	6–2, 6–1
2001	(Spain) Jacobo Díaz	(Spain) Albert Montañés	7–6^{(7–5)}, 3–6, 6–2
2000	(Argentina) Gastón Etlis	(Argentina) Agustín Calleri	6–3, 7–5
1999	(Italy) Andrea Gaudenzi	(France) Julien Boutter	6–1, 6–4
1998	(Czech Republic) Jiří Novák	(Argentina) Mariano Puerta	7–5, 6–1
1997	(Spain) Alberto Berasategui	(Croatia) Ivan Ljubičić	6–1, 6–2
1996	(Armenia) Sargis Sargsian	(Spain) Marcos Aurelio Gorriz	6–4, 6–4

==== Doubles ====
Year	Champions	Runners-up	Score
2026	(United Kingdom) Finn Bass (Bulgaria) Anthony Genov	(United States) George Goldhoff (Denmark) Johannes Ingildsen	4–6, 6–3, [10–8]
2025	(Croatia) Matej Dodig (Croatia) Nino Serdarušić	(Croatia) Luka Mikrut (Croatia) Mili Poljičak	6–4, 6–4
2024	(France) Jonathan Eysseric (France) Quentin Halys	(Romania) Alexandru Jecan (Portugal) Henrique Rocha	6–4, 6–4
2023	not held		
2022	(Czech Republic) Adam Pavlásek (Slovakia) Igor Zelenay	(Croatia) Domagoj Bilješko; Andrey Chepelev	4–6, 6–3, [10–2]
2021	(United States) Evan King (United States) Hunter Reese	(Kazakhstan) Andrey Golubev (Kazakhstan) Aleksandr Nedovyesov	6–2, 7–6^{(7–4)}
2012–2020	not held		
2011	(Spain) Daniel Muñoz-de la Nava (Spain) Rubén Ramírez Hidalgo	(Croatia) Mate Pavić (Croatia) Franko Škugor	6–2, 7–6^{(12–10)}
2010	(Germany) Andre Begemann (Australia) Matthew Ebden	(Spain) Rubén Ramírez Hidalgo (Spain) Santiago Ventura	7–6^{(7–5)}, 5–7, [10–3]
2009	(Australia) Peter Luczak (Italy) Alessandro Motti	(United States) Brendan Evans (United States) Ryan Sweeting	6–4, 6–4
2008	(Croatia) Ivan Dodig (Brazil) Júlio Silva	(Ukraine) Sergiy Stakhovsky (Czech Republic) Tomáš Zíb	6–4, 7–6^{(7–1)}
2007	(Germany) Tomas Behrend (Brazil) André Ghem	(United Kingdom) James Auckland (United Kingdom) Jamie Delgado	6–2, 6–1
2006	(Switzerland) Yves Allegro (Slovakia) Michal Mertiňák	(France) Julien Jeanpierre (France) Nicolas Renavand	6–1, 6–2
2005	(Romania) Gabriel Trifu (Belgium) Tom Vanhoudt (2)	(Italy) Enzo Artoni (Argentina) Martín Vassallo Argüello	6–2, 4–6, 7–5
2004	(Slovakia) Karol Beck (Czech Republic) Jaroslav Levinský	(Australia) Jordan Kerr (Belgium) Tom Vanhoudt	6–2, 7–6^{(7–4)}
2003	(Argentina) Lucas Arnold Ker (Argentina) Mariano Hood	(Sweden) Simon Aspelin (Australia) Todd Perry	6–1, 6–3
2002	(Belgium) Dick Norman (Belgium) Tom Vanhoudt (1)	(Australia) Jordan Kerr (Australia) Grant Silcock	6–3, 4–6, 6–3
2001	(Italy) Enzo Artoni (Argentina) Andrés Schneiter	(North Macedonia) Aleksandar Kitinov (Brazil) Alexandre Simoni	6–7^{(7–5)}, 6–4, 6–4
2000	(France) Michaël Llodra (Italy) Diego Nargiso	(Spain) Eduardo Nicolás-Espín (Spain) Germán Puentes-Alcañiz	6–2, 6–3
1999	(Croatia) Ivan Ljubičić (Croatia) Lovro Zovko	(France) Jérôme Hanquez (France) Régis Lavergne	6–3, 6–0
1998	(Spain) Julian Alonso (Argentina) Mariano Puerta	(Spain) Eduardo Nicolás-Espín (Spain) Germán Puentes-Alcañiz	6–1, 6–4
1997	(Mexico) David Roditi (Czech Republic) Tomáš Anzari	(United States) Brandon Coupe (South Africa) Paul Rosner	3–6, 7–6, 7–6
1996	(United States) Donald Johnson (United States) Jack Waite	(South Africa) Clinton Ferreira (Romania) Andrei Pavel	3–6, 6–1, 6–0

=== Women ===
==== Singles ====
Year	Champion	Runner-up	Score
2026	Erika Andreeva	(Germany) Ella Seidel	6–3, 3–6, 6–3
2025	(Croatia) Tara Würth	(Spain) Guiomar Maristany	6–2, 4–6, 6–3
2024	(Italy) Giorgia Pedone	Elena Pridankina	2–6, 6–2, 7–5
2012-2023	not held		
2011	(France) Nathalie Piquion	(Serbia) Doroteja Erić	6–3, 3–6, 6–1
2010	not held		
2009	(Slovenia) Polona Hercog	(Slovenia) Maša Zec Peškirič	7–5, 6–2
2008	(Sweden) Sofia Arvidsson	(France) Séverine Brémond	7–6^{(7–0)}, 6–2
2007	(Hungary) Ágnes Szávay	(Croatia) Nika Ožegović	6–0, 7–6^{(7–2)}

==== Doubles ====
Year	Champions	Runners-up	Score
2026	(Switzerland) Naïma Karamoko (Croatia) Tara Würth	(Romania) Briana Szabó (Latvia) Beatrise Zeltiņa	3–6, 7–6^{(7–4)}, [10–5]
2025	(Portugal) Francisca Jorge (Portugal) Matilde Jorge	(Croatia) Lucija Ćirić Bagarić; Vitalia Diatchenko	6–2, 6–0
2024	(Slovenia) Živa Falkner (Hungary) Amarissa Tóth	(Bulgaria) Lia Karatancheva (Greece) Sapfo Sakellaridi	6–4, 6–3
2012-2023	not held		
2011	(Bulgaria) Elitsa Kostova (Poland) Barbara Sobaszkiewicz	(Croatia) Ani Mijačika (Croatia) Ana Vrljić	1–6, 6–3, [12–10]
2010	not held		
2009	(Croatia) Petra Martić (Croatia) Ajla Tomljanović	(Belarus) Ksenia Milevskaya (Russia) Anastasia Pivovarova	6–3, 6–7^{(4–7)}, [10–5]
2008	(Hungary) Melinda Czink (India) Sunitha Rao	(France) Stéphanie Foretz (Croatia) Jelena Kostanić Tošić	6–4, 6–2
2007	(Finland) Emma Laine (Hungary) Ágnes Szávay	(Poland) Klaudia Jans (Poland) Alicja Rosolska	6–1, 6–2
