= 2018 Sparkassen Open – Singles =

Singles
- 2018 Sparkassen Open

Final
- Champion: (Germany) Yannick Hanfmann
- Runner-up: (Slovakia) Jozef Kovalík
- Score: 6–2, 3–6, 6–3

Events
Singles	Doubles
← 2017 ·	Sparkassen Open	· 2019 →

Nicola Kuhn was the defending champion but lost in the first round to Yannick Hanfmann.

Hanfmann won the title after defeating Jozef Kovalík 6–2, 3–6, 6–3 in the final.

== Seeds ==
1. (Uruguay) Pablo Cuevas (quarterfinals)
2. (Spain) Roberto Carballés Baena (quarterfinals)
3. (Spain) Jaume Munar (first round)
4. (Germany) Florian Mayer (first round)
5. (Moldova) Radu Albot (withdrew)
6. (Estonia) Jürgen Zopp (second round)
7. (Germany) Yannick Hanfmann (champion)
8. (Slovakia) Martin Kližan (first round)
9. (Slovakia) Jozef Kovalík (final)

== Draw ==
=== Key ===
- Q = Qualifier
- WC = Wild card
- LL = Lucky loser
- Alt = Alternate
- SE = Special exempt
- PR = Protected ranking
- ITF = ITF entry
- JE = Junior exempt
- w/o = Walkover
- r = Retired
- d = Defaulted
- SR = Special ranking

=== Finals ===
Semifinals
9	(Slovakia) Jozef Kovalík	6	6
Alt	(Belgium) Arthur De Greef	2	3
(Italy) Andrea Arnaboldi	4	2
7	(Germany) Yannick Hanfmann	6	6

Final
9	(Slovakia) Jozef Kovalík	2	6	3
7	(Germany) Yannick Hanfmann	6	3	6

=== Top half ===
First round
1	(Uruguay) P Cuevas	6	7^{7}
Q	(France) M Janvier	3	6^{4}
Q	(Germany) Marvin Netuschil	6	6
LL	(Romania) D Dima	3	1
WC	(Germany) D Masur	6	7
(Italy) S Travaglia	4	5
(Ecuador) R Quiroz	1	0
9	(Slovakia) J Kovalík	6	6
4	(Germany) F Mayer	6^{1}	6	2
Alt	(Belgium) A De Greef	7^{7}	2	6
(Russia) A Vatutin	6^{8}	5
(Brazil) R Dutra Silva	7^{10}	7
(Germany) T Kamke	1	3
(Bolivia) H Dellien	6	6
WC	(Germany) R Molleker	7	3	4
6	(Estonia) J Zopp	5	6	6

Second round
1	(Uruguay) P Cuevas	6	6
Q	(Germany) M Netuschil	3	3
WC	(Germany) D Masur	2	2
9	(Slovakia) J Kovalík	6	6
Alt	(Belgium) A De Greef	6	7^{7}
(Brazil) R Dutra Silva	4	6^{5}
(Bolivia) H Dellien	6	3	6
6	(Estonia) J Zopp	2	6	1

Quarterfinals
1	(Uruguay) P Cuevas	6^{1}	3
9	(Slovakia) J Kovalík	7^{7}	6
Alt	(Belgium) A De Greef	6	6
(Bolivia) H Dellien	4	1

Semifinals
9	(Slovakia) J Kovalík	6	6
Alt	(Belgium) A De Greef	2	3

=== Bottom half ===
First round
8	(Slovakia) M Kližan	6	0	4
Alt	(Uruguay) M Cuevas	3	6	6
(Germany) M Moraing	6	6
Q	(Belgium) K Coppejans	2	1
(Italy) A Arnaboldi	7	4	7
(Austria) S Ofner	5	6	5
Q	(Czech Republic) J Šátral	6	2	6
3	(Spain) J Munar	4	6	3
7	(Germany) Y Hanfmann	6	6
WC	(Spain) N Kuhn	1	3
(Croatia) V Galović	3	6^{2}
(Germany) D Brown	6	7^{7}
WC	(Brazil) T Bellucci	3	4
(Germany) Y Maden	6	6
(Norway) C Ruud	2	7	6^{3}
2	(Spain) R Carballés Baena	6	5	7^{7}

Second round
Alt	(Uruguay) M Cuevas	4	6	4
(Germany) M Moraing	6	2	6
(Italy) A Arnaboldi	6	4	6
Q	(Czech Republic) J Šátral	4	6	4
7	(Germany) Y Hanfmann	3	7^{7}	6
(Germany) D Brown	6	6^{5}	2
(Germany) Y Maden	6	2	5
2	(Spain) R Carballés Baena	4	6	7

Quarterfinals
(Germany) M Moraing	2	0^{r}
(Italy) A Arnaboldi	6	0
7	(Germany) Y Hanfmann	4	6	6
2	(Spain) R Carballés Baena	6	4	2

Semifinals
(Italy) A Arnaboldi	4	2
7	(Germany) Y Hanfmann	6	6
