= 2021 Sparkassen Open – Doubles =

Doubles
- 2021 Sparkassen Open

Final
- Champions: (Poland) Szymon Walków (Poland) Jan Zieliński
- Runners-up: (Croatia) Ivan Sabanov (Croatia) Matej Sabanov
- Score: 6–4, 4–6, [10–4]

Events
| Singles | Doubles |
| ← 2019 · | Sparkassen Open | · 2022 → |

Simone Bolelli and Guillermo Durán were the defending champions but only Durán chose to defend his title, partnering Tim Sandkaulen. Durán lost in the quarterfinals to Szymon Walków and Jan Zieliński.

Walków and Zieliński won the title after defeating Ivan and Matej Sabanov 6–4, 4–6, [10–4] in the final.

== Seeds ==
1. (Croatia) Ivan Sabanov / (Croatia) Matej Sabanov (final)
2. (Brazil) Fernando Romboli / (Spain) David Vega Hernández (semifinals, withdrew)
3. (Czech Republic) Zdeněk Kolář / (France) Albano Olivetti (first round)
4. (United States) James Cerretani / (Slovakia) Igor Zelenay (first round)

== Draw ==
=== Key ===
- Q = Qualifier
- WC = Wild card
- LL = Lucky loser
- Alt = Alternate
- SE = Special exempt
- PR = Protected ranking
- ITF = ITF entry
- JE = Junior exempt
- w/o = Walkover
- r = Retired
- d = Defaulted
- SR = Special ranking

First round
1 | (Croatia) I Sabanov (Croatia) M Sabanov | 6 | 4 | [10]
Alt | (Czech Republic) M Gengel (Czech Republic) Dominik Langmajer | 1 | 6 | [3]
(Poland) K Drzewiecki (Poland) K Żuk | 6 | 7
WC | (Spain) N Kuhn (Germany) M Möller | 3 | 5
3 | (Czech Republic) Z Kolář (France) A Olivetti | 7 | 6^{7} | [8]
(Ecuador) D Hidalgo (Spain) S Martos Gornés | 5 | 7^{9} | [10]
(Russia) T Gabashvili (India) A Kadhe | 4 | 5
(Netherlands) I Sijsling (Netherlands) G Smits | 6 | 7
WC | (Argentina) G Durán (Germany) T Sandkaulen | 6 | 6
WC | (Germany) Nino Ehrenschneider (Germany) Lewie Lane | 2 | 2
(Poland) S Walków (Poland) J Zieliński | 6 | 6
4 | (United States) J Cerretani (Slovakia) I Zelenay | 3 | 4
(Switzerland) S Ehrat (Germany) Lucas Gerch | 6 | 7^{9}
(India) S Balaji (Switzerland) L Margaroli | 4 | 6^{7}
(Belgium) Z Bergs (Belgium) M Geerts | 6^{7} | 2
2 | (Brazil) F Romboli (Spain) D Vega Hernández | 7^{9} | 6

Quarterfinals
1 | (Croatia) I Sabanov (Croatia) M Sabanov | 3
(Poland) K Drzewiecki (Poland) K Żuk | 0^{r}
(Ecuador) D Hidalgo (Spain) S Martos Gornés | 6 | 3 | [8]
(Netherlands) I Sijsling (Netherlands) G Smits | 4 | 6 | [10]
WC | (Argentina) G Durán (Germany) T Sandkaulen | 5 | 4
(Poland) S Walków (Poland) J Zieliński | 7 | 6
(Switzerland) S Ehrat (Germany) L Gerch | 4 | 4
2 | (Brazil) F Romboli (Spain) D Vega Hernández | 6 | 6

Semifinals
1 | (Croatia) I Sabanov (Croatia) M Sabanov | 6 | 6
(Netherlands) I Sijsling (Netherlands) G Smits | 1 | 2
(Poland) S Walków (Poland) J Zieliński | w/o
2 | (Brazil) F Romboli (Spain) D Vega Hernández

Final
1 | (Croatia) I Sabanov (Croatia) M Sabanov | 4 | 6 | [4]
(Poland) S Walków (Poland) J Zieliński | 6 | 4 | [10]
