= 2018 Sparkassen Open – Doubles =

Doubles
- 2018 Sparkassen Open

Final
- Champions: (Mexico) Santiago González (Netherlands) Wesley Koolhof
- Runners-up: (India) Sriram Balaji (India) Vishnu Vardhan
- Score: 6–3, 6–3

Events
Singles	Doubles
← 2017 ·	Sparkassen Open	· 2019 →

Julian Knowle and Igor Zelenay were the defending champions but only Zelenay chose to defend his title, partnering Denys Molchanov. Zelenay lost in the quarterfinals to Andre Begemann and Dustin Brown.

Santiago González and Wesley Koolhof won the title after defeating Sriram Balaji and Vishnu Vardhan 6–3, 6–3 in the final.

== Seeds ==
1. (Mexico) Santiago González / (Netherlands) Wesley Koolhof (champions)
2. (Czech Republic) Roman Jebavý / (Argentina) Andrés Molteni (quarterfinals)
3. (Ukraine) Denys Molchanov / (Slovakia) Igor Zelenay (quarterfinals)
4. (Belgium) Sander Gillé / (Belgium) Joran Vliegen (first round)

== Draw ==
=== Key ===
- Q = Qualifier
- WC = Wild card
- LL = Lucky loser
- Alt = Alternate
- SE = Special exempt
- PR = Protected ranking
- ITF = ITF entry
- JE = Junior exempt
- w/o = Walkover
- r = Retired
- d = Defaulted
- SR = Special ranking

First round
1	(Mexico) S González (Netherlands) W Koolhof	7^{9}	6
WC	(Germany) Niklas Guttau (Germany) George von Massow	6^{7}	1
(Uruguay) M Cuevas (Uruguay) P Cuevas	6	7
WC	(Germany) M Möller (Germany) R Molleker	4	5
3	(Ukraine) D Molchanov (Slovakia) I Zelenay	6	6^{1}	[10]
(Austria) S Ofner (Italy) S Travaglia	2	7^{7}	[3]
(Germany) A Begemann (Germany) D Brown	7^{7}	6
(Poland) T Bednarek (Australia) R Junaid	6^{2}	2
(Chinese Taipei) H-y Peng (Austria) T-S Weissborn	7	6
(Argentina) F Agamenone (Bolivia) H Dellien	5	2
WC	(Spain) N Kuhn (Norway) C Ruud	6	6^{4}	[10]
4	(Belgium) S Gillé (Belgium) J Vliegen	4	7^{7}	[6]
(India) S Balaji (India) V Vardhan	6	6
(Brazil) F Neis (South Africa) R Roelofse	4	3
(Monaco) R Arneodo (Italy) A Vavassori	3	3
2	(Czech Republic) R Jebavý (Argentina) A Molteni	6	6

Quarterfinals
1	(Mexico) S González (Netherlands) W Koolhof	7^{7}	6
(Uruguay) M Cuevas (Uruguay) P Cuevas	6^{4}	1
3	(Ukraine) D Molchanov (Slovakia) I Zelenay	3	4
(Germany) A Begemann (Germany) D Brown	6	6
(Chinese Taipei) H-y Peng (Austria) T-S Weissborn	6	4	[8]
WC	(Spain) N Kuhn (Norway) C Ruud	2	6	[10]
(India) S Balaji (India) V Vardhan	6^{7}	6	[10]
2	(Czech Republic) R Jebavý (Argentina) A Molteni	7^{9}	4	[8]

Semifinals
1	(Mexico) S González (Netherlands) W Koolhof	6	6
(Germany) A Begemann (Germany) D Brown	0	3
WC	(Spain) N Kuhn (Norway) C Ruud	6	6^{5}	[10]
(India) S Balaji (India) V Vardhan	4	7^{7}	[12]

Final
1	(Mexico) S González (Netherlands) W Koolhof	6	6
(India) S Balaji (India) V Vardhan	3	3
