= 2018 Sparkassen Open =

- Date: 9–14 July
- Edition: 25th
- Surface: Clay
- Location: Braunschweig, Germany

Champions

Singles
- (Germany) Yannick Hanfmann

Doubles
- (Mexico) Santiago González / (Netherlands) Wesley Koolhof
← 2017 ·	Sparkassen Open	· 2019 →

The 2018 Sparkassen Open was a professional tennis tournament played on clay courts. It was the 25th edition of the tournament which was part of the 2018 ATP Challenger Tour. It took place in Braunschweig, Germany between 9 and 14 July 2018.

== Singles main-draw entrants ==
=== Seeds ===
Country	Player	Rank^{1}	Seed
URU	Pablo Cuevas	76	1
ESP	Roberto Carballés Baena	79	2
ESP	Jaume Munar	89	3
GER	Florian Mayer	91	4
~~MDA~~	~~Radu Albot~~	~~98~~	~~5~~
EST	Jürgen Zopp	107	6
GER	Yannick Hanfmann	111	7
SVK	Martin Kližan	115	8
SVK	Jozef Kovalík	117	9

- ^{1} Rankings are as of 2 July 2018.

=== Other entrants ===
The following players received wildcards into the singles main draw:

- (Brazil) Thomaz Bellucci
- (Spain) Nicola Kuhn
- (Germany) Daniel Masur
- (Germany) Rudolf Molleker

The following players received entry into the singles main draw as alternates:

- (Uruguay) Martín Cuevas
- (Belgium) Arthur De Greef

The following players received entry from the qualifying draw:

- (Belgium) Kimmer Coppejans
- (France) Maxime Janvier
- (Germany) Marvin Netuschil
- (Czech Republic) Jan Šátral

The following player received entry as a lucky loser:

- (Romania) Dragoș Dima

== Champions ==
=== Singles ===
- (Germany) Yannick Hanfmann def. (Slovakia) Jozef Kovalík 6–2, 3–6, 6–3.

=== Doubles ===
- (Mexico) Santiago González / (Netherlands) Wesley Koolhof def. (India) Sriram Balaji / (India) Vishnu Vardhan 6–3, 6–3.
