= 2024 Brawo Open – Doubles =

Doubles
- 2024 Brawo Open

Final
- Champions: (Netherlands) Sander Arends (Netherlands) Robin Haase
- Runners-up: (India) Sriram Balaji (Ecuador) Gonzalo Escobar
- Score: 4–6, 6–4, [10–8]

Events
Singles	Doubles
- Brawo Open

Pierre-Hugues Herbert and Arthur Reymond were the defending champions but chose not to defend their title.

Sander Arends and Robin Haase won the title after defeating Sriram Balaji and Gonzalo Escobar 4–6, 6–4, [10–8] in the final.

== Seeds ==
1. (India) Sriram Balaji / (Ecuador) Gonzalo Escobar (final)
2. (Netherlands) Sander Arends / (Netherlands) Robin Haase (champions)
3. (Argentina) Guido Andreozzi / (Mexico) Miguel Ángel Reyes-Varela (semifinals)
4. (Netherlands) Matwé Middelkoop / (Ukraine) Denys Molchanov (semifinals)

== Draw ==
Key

- Q = Qualifier
- WC = Wild card
- LL = Lucky loser
- Alt = Alternate
- ITF = ITF entry
- PR = Protected ranking
- SR = Special ranking
- SE = Special exempt
- JE = Junior exempt
- JR = Junior Accelerator Programme entrant
- CO = College Accelerator Programme entrant
- NG = Next Gen Accelerator Program entrant
- w/o = Walkover
- r = Retired
- d = Defaulted

=== Draw ===
First round
1	(India) S Balaji (Ecuador) G Escobar	6	6
(Bolivia) B Arias (Bolivia) F Zeballos	3	0
(Brazil) M Demoliner (Argentina) G Durán	6	4	[10]
(Germany) D Masur (Austria) J Rodionov	4	6	[4]
4	(Netherlands) M Middelkoop (Ukraine) D Molchanov	4	6	[10]
(India) J Nedunchezhiyan (India) VS Prashanth	6	2	[5]
(Netherlands) D Pel (Netherlands) B Stevens	7	2	[10]
(Greece) M Kalovelonis (Spain) D Vega Hernández	5	6	[7]
(Monaco) R Arneodo (France) G Blancaneaux	6	6
(Italy) F Agamenone (Argentina) P Cachín	2	4
Alt	(France) C Bittoun Kouzmine (Ukraine) V Uzhylovskyi	1	4
3	(Argentina) G Andreozzi (Mexico) MÁ Reyes-Varela	6	6
WC	(Germany) J Engel (Germany) Liam Gavrielides	2	4
WC	(Germany) N Kuhn (Germany) N McDonald	6	6
I Liutarevich (Spain) S Martos Gornés	3	4
2	(Netherlands) S Arends (Netherlands) R Haase	6	6

Quarterfinals
1	(India) S Balaji (Ecuador) G Escobar	6	6
(Brazil) M Demoliner (Argentina) G Durán	4	2
4	(Netherlands) M Middelkoop (Ukraine) D Molchanov	6	6
(Netherlands) D Pel (Netherlands) B Stevens	2	4
(Monaco) R Arneodo (France) G Blancaneaux	5	4
3	(Argentina) G Andreozzi (Mexico) MÁ Reyes-Varela	7	6
WC	(Germany) N Kuhn (Germany) N McDonald	6	6^{8}	[7]
2	(Netherlands) S Arends (Netherlands) R Haase	4	7^{10}	[10]

Semifinals
1	(India) S Balaji (Ecuador) G Escobar	6	7^{7}
4	(Netherlands) M Middelkoop (Ukraine) D Molchanov	3	6^{3}
3	(Argentina) G Andreozzi (Mexico) MÁ Reyes-Varela	4	4
2	(Netherlands) S Arends (Netherlands) R Haase	6	6

Final
1	(India) S Balaji (Ecuador) G Escobar	6	4	[8]
2	(Netherlands) S Arends (Netherlands) R Haase	4	6	[10]
