= 2015 Sparkassen Open – Singles =

Singles
- 2015 Sparkassen Open

Final
- Champion: (Serbia) Filip Krajinović
- Runner-up: (France) Paul-Henri Mathieu
- Score: 6–2, 6–4

Events
Singles	Doubles
← 2014 ·	Sparkassen Open	· 2016 →

Alexander Zverev was the defending champion, but he lost in the second round to Daniel Brands.

== Seeds ==
1. (Spain) Pablo Carreño Busta (quarterfinals)
2. (Spain) Marcel Granollers (first round)
3. (Germany) Alexander Zverev (second round)
4. (Brazil) João Souza (second round)
5. (Bosnia and Herzegovina) Damir Džumhur (second round)
6. (Moldova) Radu Albot (first round)
7. (Spain) Daniel Muñoz de la Nava (second round)
8. (Germany) Matthias Bachinger (second round)

== Draw ==
=== Key ===
- Q = Qualifier
- WC = Wild card
- LL = Lucky loser
- Alt = Alternate
- SE = Special exempt
- PR = Protected ranking
- ITF = ITF entry
- JE = Junior exempt
- w/o = Walkover
- r = Retired
- d = Defaulted
- SR = Special ranking

=== Finals ===
Semifinals
(Serbia) Filip Krajinović	7	6
(Japan) Taro Daniel	5	2
(Netherlands) Thiemo de Bakker	3	3
(France) Paul-Henri Mathieu	6	6

Final
(Serbia) Filip Krajinović	6	6
(France) Paul-Henri Mathieu	2	4

=== Top half ===
First round
1	(Spain) P Carreño Busta	2	6	6
WC	(Germany) F Mayer	6	2	4
(Uzbekistan) F Dustov	1	0
Q	(Brazil) R Dutra Silva	6	6
(Serbia) F Krajinović	2	6	6
PR	(Spain) P Riba	6	3	4
WC	(Germany) M Zverev	3	6	5
7	(Spain) D Muñoz de la Nava	6	3	7
3	(Germany) A Zverev	6	1	6
Q	(Bulgaria) D Kuzmanov	0	6	3
WC	(Germany) D Brands	6	6
(Slovakia) N Gombos	2	4
(Japan) T Daniel	6	6
(Germany) T Kamke	1	4
Alt	(Portugal) G Elias	4	6^{2}
5	(Bosnia and Herzegovina) D Džumhur	6	7^{7}

Second round
1	(Spain) P Carreño Busta	6	1	6
Q	(Brazil) R Dutra Silva	3	6	4
(Serbia) F Krajinović	6	6
7	(Spain) D Muñoz de la Nava	4	0
3	(Germany) A Zverev	7^{7}	3	3
WC	(Germany) D Brands	6^{5}	6	6
(Japan) T Daniel	6	3	6
5	(Bosnia and Herzegovina) D Džumhur	4	6	3

Quarterfinals
1	(Spain) P Carreño Busta	5	6	3
(Serbia) F Krajinović	7	4	6
WC	(Germany) D Brands	4	6^{4}
(Japan) T Daniel	6	7^{7}

Semifinals
(Serbia) F Krajinović	7	6
(Japan) T Daniel	5	2

=== Bottom half ===
First round
6	(Moldova) R Albot	4	7	6^{0}
(Germany) J-L Struff	6	5	7^{7}
(Netherlands) T de Bakker	6	6
Q	(Australia) J Kubler	4	2
(Argentina) H Zeballos	6	6
WC	(Germany) M Marterer	3	4
(Russia) A Kudryavtsev	2	5
4	(Brazil) J Souza	6	7
8	(Germany) M Bachinger	6	6
Q	(Russia) K Khachanov	4	4
(Sweden) E Ymer	4	6	4
SE	(Germany) N Langer	6	2	6
(Argentina) F Argüello	1	1
(France) P-H Mathieu	6	6
(Brazil) A Ghem	6	6
2	(Spain) M Granollers	4	2

Second round
(Germany) J-L Struff	3	3
(Netherlands) T de Bakker	6	6
(Argentina) H Zeballos	6	7^{7}
4	(Brazil) J Souza	3	6^{1}
8	(Germany) M Bachinger	4	5
SE	(Germany) N Langer	6	7
(France) P-H Mathieu	6	6
(Brazil) A Ghem	3	2

Quarterfinals
(Netherlands) T de Bakker	3	6	6
(Argentina) H Zeballos	6	3	4
SE	(Germany) N Langer
(France) P-H Mathieu	w/o

Semifinals
(Netherlands) T de Bakker	3	3
(France) P-H Mathieu	6	6
