= 2016 Sparkassen Open – Singles =

Singles
- 2016 Sparkassen Open

Final
- Champion: (Brazil) Thomaz Bellucci
- Runner-up: (Spain) Íñigo Cervantes
- Score: 6–1, 1–6, 6–3

Events
| Singles | Doubles |
| ← 2015 · | Sparkassen Open | · 2017 → |

Filip Krajinović was the defending champion but chose not to defend his title.

Thomaz Bellucci won the title after defeating Íñigo Cervantes 6–1, 1–6, 6–3 in the final.

== Seeds ==
1. (Brazil) Thomaz Bellucci (champion)
2. (Spain) Íñigo Cervantes (final)
3. (Germany) Florian Mayer (second round)
4. (Germany) Jan-Lennard Struff (second round)
5. (Argentina) Leonardo Mayer (first round)
6. (Portugal) Gastão Elias (first round)
7. (Argentina) Facundo Bagnis (second round)
8. (Russia) Karen Khachanov (second round)

== Draw ==
=== Key ===
- Q = Qualifier
- WC = Wild card
- LL = Lucky loser
- Alt = Alternate
- SE = Special exempt
- PR = Protected ranking
- ITF = ITF entry
- JE = Junior exempt
- w/o = Walkover
- r = Retired
- d = Defaulted
- SR = Special ranking

=== Finals ===
Semifinals
1 | (Brazil) Thomaz Bellucci | 6^{6} | 6 | 6
(Russia) Teymuraz Gabashvili | 7^{8} | 4 | 4
(Germany) Tobias Kamke | 5 | 3
2 | (Spain) Íñigo Cervantes | 7 | 6

Final
1 | (Brazil) Thomaz Bellucci | 6 | 1 | 6
2 | (Spain) Íñigo Cervantes | 1 | 6 | 3

=== Top half ===
First round
1 | (Brazil) T Bellucci | 6 | 6
WC | (Germany) A Beck | 3 | 2
Q | (Croatia) A Pavić | 6 | 7^{7}
(Germany) M Berrer | 3 | 6^{3}
(Georgia (country)) N Basilashvili | 1 | 6 | 6
(Netherlands) I Sijsling | 6 | 2 | 1
Q | (Italy) G Mager | 2 | 7^{7} | 0
8 | (Russia) K Khachanov | 6 | 6^{5} | 6
4/WC | (Germany) J-L Struff | 6 | 7^{7}
Q | (Argentina) Juan Ignacio Galarza | 3 | 6^{0}
(Slovakia) J Kovalík | 6^{2} | 6 | 4
(Japan) T Daniel | 7^{7} | 0 | 6
(Russia) T Gabashvili | 7 | 4 | 6
Alt | (France) K de Schepper | 5 | 6 | 1
(Germany) N Langer | 6 | 6
5 | (Argentina) L Mayer | 4 | 4

Second round
1 | (Brazil) T Bellucci | 6 | 6
Q | (Croatia) A Pavić | 4 | 3
(Georgia (country)) N Basilashvili | 6 | 4 | 6
8 | (Russia) K Khachanov | 2 | 6 | 4
4/WC | (Germany) J-L Struff | 3 | 6 | 4
(Japan) T Daniel | 6 | 1 | 6
(Russia) T Gabashvili | 6 | 7^{7}
(Germany) N Langer | 1 | 6^{5}

Quarterfinals
1 | (Brazil) T Bellucci | 6 | 6
(Georgia (country)) N Basilashvili | 0 | 4
(Japan) T Daniel | 6^{5} | 1
(Russia) T Gabashvili | 7^{7} | 6

Semifinals
1 | (Brazil) T Bellucci | 6^{6} | 6 | 6
(Russia) T Gabashvili | 7^{8} | 4 | 4

=== Bottom half ===
First round
6 | (Portugal) G Elias | 3 | 2
(Moldova) R Albot | 6 | 6
Q | (Germany) C-M Stebe | 6 | 7
WC | (Germany) M Bachinger | 1 | 5
(Germany) T Kamke | 6 | 6
WC | (Germany) D Masur | 4 | 4
Alt | (Czech Republic) M Michalička | 0 | 7 | 6^{2}
3 | (Germany) F Mayer | 6 | 5 | 7^{7}
7 | (Argentina) F Bagnis | 6 | 5 | 6
(Austria) G Melzer | 4 | 7 | 2
(Germany) M Zverev | 6 | 6
(Germany) D Brands | 2 | 3
(France) A Michon | 6 | 7^{7}
Alt | (Czech Republic) Michal Konečný | 2 | 6^{1}
LL | (Slovakia) N Gombos | 4 | 4
2 | (Spain) Í Cervantes | 6 | 6

Second round
(Moldova) R Albot | 6 | 6
Q | (Germany) C-M Stebe | 3 | 4
(Germany) T Kamke | 3 | 6 | 6
3 | (Germany) F Mayer | 6 | 4 | 3
7 | (Argentina) F Bagnis | 6^{5} | 6 | 4
(Germany) M Zverev | 7^{7} | 2 | 6
(France) A Michon | 1 | 4
2 | (Spain) Í Cervantes | 6 | 6

Quarterfinals
(Moldova) R Albot | 6^{5} | 6^{3}
(Germany) T Kamke | 7^{7} | 7^{7}
(Germany) M Zverev | 4 | 4
2 | (Spain) Í Cervantes | 6 | 6

Semifinals
(Germany) T Kamke | 5 | 3
2 | (Spain) Í Cervantes | 7 | 6
