= 2022 Brawo Open – Doubles =

Doubles
- 2022 Brawo Open

Final
- Champions: (Brazil) Marcelo Demoliner (Germany) Jan-Lennard Struff
- Runners-up: (Czech Republic) Roman Jebavý (Czech Republic) Adam Pavlásek
- Score: 6–4, 7–5

Events
Singles	Doubles
← 2021 ·	Brawo Open	· 2023 →

Szymon Walków and Jan Zieliński were the defending champions but chose not to defend their title.

Marcelo Demoliner and Jan-Lennard Struff won the title after defeating Roman Jebavý and Adam Pavlásek 6–4, 7–5 in the final.

== Seeds ==
1. (Uruguay) Ariel Behar / (Bosnia and Herzegovina) Tomislav Brkić (quarterfinals)
2. (Colombia) Nicolás Barrientos / (Mexico) Miguel Ángel Reyes-Varela (first round)
3. (France) Albano Olivetti / (Brazil) Fernando Romboli (first round)
4. (Serbia) Ivan Sabanov / (Serbia) Matej Sabanov (first round)

== Draw ==
=== Key ===
- Q = Qualifier
- WC = Wild card
- LL = Lucky loser
- Alt = Alternate
- SE = Special exempt
- PR = Protected ranking
- ITF = ITF entry
- JE = Junior exempt
- w/o = Walkover
- r = Retired
- d = Defaulted
- SR = Special ranking

First round
1	(Uruguay) A Behar (Bosnia and Herzegovina) T Brkić	7^{16}	6
(Jamaica) D Brown (United States) E King	6^{14}	2
(France) G Blancaneaux (Switzerland) D Stricker	3	4
(Czech Republic) R Jebavý (Czech Republic) A Pavlásek	6	6
3	(France) A Olivetti (Brazil) F Romboli	6^{1}	6	[5]
(Ukraine) D Molchanov (Slovakia) I Zelenay	7^{7}	2	[10]
PR	(India) S Nagal (New Zealand) A Sitak	7	5	[6]
WC	(Germany) P Florig (Germany) Liam Gavrielides	5	7	[10]
(Netherlands) B Stevens (Netherlands) S Verbeek	3	6^{3}
WC	(Germany) F Fallert (Germany) H Jebens	6	7^{7}
(Netherlands) S Arends (Netherlands) D Pel	7^{7}	6
4	(Serbia) I Sabanov (Serbia) M Sabanov	6^{2}	4
(Italy) M Bortolotti (Spain) S Martos Gornés	6	2	[10]
(United States) J Cerretani (Belgium) M Geerts	3	6	[4]
(Brazil) M Demoliner (Germany) J-L Struff	6	6
2	(Colombia) N Barrientos (Mexico) MÁ Reyes-Varela	4	4

Quarterfinals
1	(Uruguay) A Behar (Bosnia and Herzegovina) T Brkić	7^{7}	4	[7]
(Czech Republic) R Jebavý (Czech Republic) A Pavlásek	6^{4}	6	[10]
(Ukraine) D Molchanov (Slovakia) I Zelenay	6	7^{9}
WC	(Germany) P Florig (Germany) L Gavrielides	2	6^{7}
WC	(Germany) F Fallert (Germany) H Jebens	3	6^{6}
(Netherlands) S Arends (Netherlands) D Pel	6	7^{8}
(Italy) M Bortolotti (Spain) S Martos Gornés	7^{7}	4	[11]
(Brazil) M Demoliner (Germany) J-L Struff	6^{0}	6	[13]

Semifinals
(Czech Republic) R Jebavý (Czech Republic) A Pavlásek	6	6
(Ukraine) D Molchanov (Slovakia) I Zelenay	3	1
(Netherlands) S Arends (Netherlands) D Pel	2	4
(Brazil) M Demoliner (Germany) J-L Struff	6	6

Final
(Czech Republic) R Jebavý (Czech Republic) A Pavlásek	4	5
(Brazil) M Demoliner (Germany) J-L Struff	6	7
