= 2023 Brawo Open – Singles =

Singles
- 2023 Brawo Open

Final
- Champion: (Italy) Franco Agamenone
- Runner-up: Pavel Kotov
- Score: 7–5, 6–3

Events
Singles	Doubles
← 2022 ·	Brawo Open	· 2024 →

Jan-Lennard Struff was the defending champion but chose not to defend his title.

Franco Agamenone won the title after defeating Pavel Kotov 7–5, 6–3 in the final.

== Seeds ==
1. (Germany) Daniel Altmaier (quarterfinals)
2. (Slovakia) Alex Molčan (first round)
3. (Italy) Marco Cecchinato (first round)
4. (Argentina) Federico Coria (first round)
5. Pavel Kotov (final)
6. (Japan) Taro Daniel (second round)
7. (Spain) Jaume Munar (first round)
8. (Spain) Pedro Martínez (second round)

== Draw ==
=== Key ===
- Q = Qualifier
- WC = Wild card
- LL = Lucky loser
- Alt = Alternate
- SE = Special exempt
- PR = Protected ranking
- ITF = ITF entry
- JE = Junior exempt
- w/o = Walkover
- r = Retired
- d = Defaulted
- SR = Special ranking

=== Finals ===
Semifinals
(Italy) Franco Agamenone	6	6
Q	(Lebanon) Benjamin Hassan	2	3
(Brazil) Thiago Seyboth Wild	4	6^{4}
5	Pavel Kotov	6	7^{7}

Final
(Italy) Franco Agamenone	7	6
5	Pavel Kotov	5	3

=== Top half ===
First round
1/WC	(Germany) D Altmaier	6	6
Q	(Spain) C Taberner	3	3
(Netherlands) J Sels	2	6^{5}
(Italy) F Passaro	6	7^{7}
(Germany) M Marterer	6	6^{5}	4
(Italy) F Agamenone	3	7^{7}	6
LL	(Sweden) K Friberg	4	6^{2}
6	(Japan) T Daniel	6	7^{7}
3	(Italy) M Cecchinato	5	6^{1}
Q	(Lebanon) B Hassan	7	7^{7}
(Kazakhstan) T Skatov	6	6
Q	(France) C Bittoun Kouzmine	3	1
(Bulgaria) A Andreev	6	3	6
(France) G Blancaneaux	4	6	3
Q	(Denmark) A Holmgren	2	7	7^{7}
7	(Spain) J Munar	6	5	6^{5}

Second round
1/WC	(Germany) D Altmaier	6	6
(Italy) F Passaro	2	0
(Italy) F Agamenone	2	6	7^{8}
6	(Japan) T Daniel	6	3	6^{6}
Q	(Lebanon) B Hassan	6	3	6
(Kazakhstan) T Skatov	4	6	3
(Bulgaria) A Andreev	4	6	6^{5}
Q	(Denmark) A Holmgren	6	3	7^{7}

Quarterfinals
1/WC	(Germany) D Altmaier	3	6	3
(Italy) F Agamenone	6	2	6
Q	(Lebanon) B Hassan	3	7^{9}	6
Q	(Denmark) A Holmgren	6	6^{7}	3

Semifinals
(Italy) F Agamenone	6	6
Q	(Lebanon) B Hassan	2	3

=== Bottom half ===
First round
8	(Spain) P Martínez	6	6
Alt	(Italy) S Travaglia	4	3
WC	(Germany) R Molleker	6	3	4
(Slovakia) J Kovalík	4	6	6
Q	(Kazakhstan) D Yevseyev	6	4	1
(Brazil) T Seyboth Wild	4	6	6
Q	(Germany) D Masur	4	6	6
4	(Argentina) F Coria	6	4	3
5	P Kotov	7^{9}	6
(Bolivia) H Dellien	6^{7}	2
WC	(Germany) M Topo	6	2	4
Alt	(Switzerland) H Laaksonen	4	6	6
PR	(France) P-H Herbert	4	6	6
I Gakhov	6	3	4
(United Kingdom) J Choinski	2	6	7^{7}
2	(Slovakia) A Molčan	6	3	6^{3}

Second round
8	(Spain) P Martínez	6	5	3
(Slovakia) J Kovalík	2	7	6
(Brazil) T Seyboth Wild	6	6
Q	(Germany) D Masur	2	3
5	P Kotov	6	0
Alt	(Switzerland) H Laaksonen	0	0^{r}
PR	(France) P-H Herbert	7^{7}	4	6^{5}
(United Kingdom) J Choinski	6^{3}	6	7^{7}

Quarterfinals
(Slovakia) J Kovalík	6	6^{5}	4
(Brazil) T Seyboth Wild	3	7^{7}	6
5	P Kotov	6^{3}	6	6
(United Kingdom) J Choinski	7^{7}	3	2

Semifinals
(Brazil) T Seyboth Wild	4	6^{4}
5	P Kotov	6	7^{7}
