= 2022 Brawo Open – Singles =

Singles
- 2022 Brawo Open

Final
- Champion: (Germany) Jan-Lennard Struff
- Runner-up: (Germany) Maximilian Marterer
- Score: 6–2, 6–2

Events
Singles	Doubles
← 2021 ·	Brawo Open	· 2023 →

Daniel Altmaier was the defending champion but chose not to defend his title.

Jan-Lennard Struff won the title after defeating Maximilian Marterer 6–2, 6–2 in the final.

== Seeds ==
1. (Spain) Pedro Martínez (second round)
2. (Argentina) Federico Coria (quarterfinals)
3. (Argentina) Federico Delbonis (first round)
4. (Spain) Bernabé Zapata Miralles (quarterfinals)
5. (Switzerland) Henri Laaksonen (semifinals)
6. (Spain) Carlos Taberner (withdrew)
7. (Colombia) Daniel Elahi Galán (first round)
8. (Peru) Juan Pablo Varillas (first round, retired)

== Draw ==
=== Key ===
- Q = Qualifier
- WC = Wild card
- LL = Lucky loser
- Alt = Alternate
- SE = Special exempt
- PR = Protected ranking
- ITF = ITF entry
- JE = Junior exempt
- w/o = Walkover
- r = Retired
- d = Defaulted
- SR = Special ranking

=== Finals ===
Semifinals
SE	(China) Zhang Zhizhen	3	7	6^{4}
(Germany) Maximilian Marterer	6	5	7^{7}
(Germany) Jan-Lennard Struff	6	6
5	(Switzerland) Henri Laaksonen	3	3

Final
(Germany) Maximilian Marterer	2	2
(Germany) Jan-Lennard Struff	6	6

=== Top half ===
First round
1/WC	(Spain) P Martínez	7^{8}	4	6
SE	(Lebanon) B Hassan	6^{6}	6	4
LL	(Belgium) M Geerts	7^{11}	2	3
SE	(China) Zh Zhang	6^{9}	6	6
Alt	(Italy) M Cecchinato	7^{7}	5	7
Q	(Slovakia) J Kovalík	6^{3}	7	5
(Portugal) G Elias	6^{5}	3
Q	(Poland) K Żuk	7^{7}	6
4	(Spain) B Zapata Miralles	6	6
(Czech Republic) V Kopřiva	1	1
Alt	(India) S Nagal	6^{4}	3
Q	(Ukraine) O Krutykh	7^{7}	6
(Germany) M Marterer	6	6
Q	(Bulgaria) A Andreev	3	2
Q	(France) M Janvier	6	3	6
7	(Colombia) DE Galán	3	6	4

Second round
1/WC	(Spain) P Martínez	5	3
SE	(China) Zh Zhang	7	6
Alt	(Italy) M Cecchinato	6	4	6
Q	(Poland) K Żuk	1	6	2
4	(Spain) B Zapata Miralles	6	6
Q	(Ukraine) O Krutykh	3	1
(Germany) M Marterer	6	6
Q	(France) M Janvier	3	3

Quarterfinals
SE	(China) Zh Zhang	6	6^{2}	6
Alt	(Italy) M Cecchinato	4	7^{7}	3
4	(Spain) B Zapata Miralles	3	7^{7}	6^{4}
(Germany) M Marterer	6	6^{5}	7^{7}

Semifinals
SE	(China) Zh Zhang	3	7	6^{4}
(Germany) M Marterer	6	5	7^{7}

=== Bottom half ===
First round
8	(Peru) JP Varillas	1^{r}
(Germany) Y Hanfmann	5
(Japan) T Daniel	6	6
(Italy) R Bonadio	1	1
(Italy) F Agamenone	6	6
WC	(Germany) R Molleker	3	3
(Germany) J-L Struff	6	7^{7}
3	(Argentina) F Delbonis	2	6^{2}
5	(Switzerland) H Laaksonen	6^{5}	7^{7}	6
(Switzerland) D Stricker	7^{7}	6^{4}	4
Q	(Brazil) Oscar José Gutierrez	6	6
WC	(Germany) M Topo	2	2
(Germany) M Moraing	7^{8}	6
(Italy) S Travaglia	6^{6}	4
(France) G Blancaneaux	2	4
2	(Argentina) F Coria	6	6

Second round
(Germany) Y Hanfmann	6	3	2
(Japan) T Daniel	4	6	6
(Italy) F Agamenone	3	1
(Germany) J-L Struff	6	6
5	(Switzerland) H Laaksonen	6^{2}	6	6
Q	(Brazil) OJ Gutierrez	7^{7}	3	4
(Germany) M Moraing	2	5
2	(Argentina) F Coria	6	7

Quarterfinals
(Japan) T Daniel	2	1
(Germany) J-L Struff	6	6
5	(Switzerland) H Laaksonen	6	6
2	(Argentina) F Coria	4	3

Semifinals
(Germany) J-L Struff	6	6
5	(Switzerland) H Laaksonen	3	3
