= 2026 Brawo Open – Singles =

Singles
- 2026 Brawo Open

Final
- Champion: (United Kingdom) Jan Choinski
- Runner-up: (France) Hugo Gaston
- Score: 4–6, 6–0, 6–4

Events
Singles	Doubles
- Brawo Open

Mariano Navone was the defending champion but chose not to defend his title.

Jan Choinski won the title after defeating Hugo Gaston 4–6, 6–0, 6–4 in the final.

== Seeds ==
1. (Argentina) Román Andrés Burruchaga (first round)
2. (Paraguay) Daniel Vallejo (second round, retired)
3. (Argentina) Francisco Comesaña (withdrew)
4. (United Kingdom) Jan Choinski (champion)
5. (Austria) Sebastian Ofner (second round)
6. (Georgia (country)) Nikoloz Basilashvili (first round)
7. (Czech Republic) Dalibor Svrčina (second round)
8. (France) Hugo Gaston (final)

== Draw ==
Key

- Q = Qualifier
- WC = Wild card
- LL = Lucky loser
- Alt = Alternate
- ITF = ITF entry
- PR = Protected ranking
- SR = Special ranking
- SE = Special exempt
- JE = Junior exempt
- JR = Junior Accelerator Programme entrant
- CO = College Accelerator Programme entrant
- NG = Next Gen Accelerator Program entrant
- w/o = Walkover
- r = Retired
- d = Defaulted

=== Finals ===
Semifinals
(Spain) Daniel Rincón	5	2
4	(United Kingdom) Jan Choinski	7	6
(Argentina) Facundo Díaz Acosta	7	6^{4}	5
8	(France) Hugo Gaston	5	7^{7}	7

Final
4	(United Kingdom) Jan Choinski	4	6	6
8	(France) Hugo Gaston	6	0	4

=== Top half ===
First round
1	(Argentina) RA Burruchaga	3	3
WC	(Germany) M Schönhaus	6	6
(Serbia) L Djere	6	6
(Peru) G Bueno	1	2
(Spain) D Rincón	6	6
(Germany) T Gentzsch	4	4
Q	(Slovakia) N Gombos	3	3
5	(Austria) S Ofner	6	6
4	(United Kingdom) J Choinski	6	6
Q	(Bulgaria) D Kuzmanov	4	4
Alt	(Germany) MH Rehberg	6	6
NG	(France) M Kouamé	4	4
(Germany) D Dedura	6	3	6
(France) C Tabur	1	6	4
Q	(Brazil) T Seyboth Wild	4	3
7	(Czech Republic) D Svrčina	6	6

Second round
WC	(Germany) M Schönhaus	5	4
(Serbia) L Djere	7	6
(Spain) D Rincón	3	7	6
5	(Austria) S Ofner	6	5	3
4	(United Kingdom) J Choinski	2	7	6
Alt	(Germany) MH Rehberg	6	5	4
(Germany) D Dedura	6	7^{7}
7	(Czech Republic) D Svrčina	3	6^{3}

Quarterfinals
(Serbia) L Djere	7^{7}	4	3
(Spain) D Rincón	6^{3}	6	6
4	(United Kingdom) J Choinski	6	6
(Germany) D Dedura	4	1

Semifinals
(Spain) D Rincón	5	2
4	(United Kingdom) J Choinski	7	6

=== Bottom half ===
First round
6	(Georgia (country)) N Basilashvili	3	7^{7}	2
(Lithuania) V Gaubas	6	6^{5}	6
Q	(Germany) R Molleker	3	6	4
(Argentina) F Díaz Acosta	6	3	6
WC	(Germany) N McDonald	6	6
(United States) K Smith	1	3
(Czech Republic) M Krumich	7	4	6
LL	(Italy) S Pieri	5	6	3
8	(France) H Gaston	6	6
Q	Andrey Chepelev	4	1
(Kazakhstan) T Skatov	5	3
Q	(Germany) Mika Petkovic	7	6
SE	(Germany) M Möller	0	6	7^{8}
WC	(Germany) B Sanchez Martinez	6	3	6^{6}
(Bolivia) JC Prado Ángelo	2	4
2	(Paraguay) AD Vallejo	6	6

Second round
(Lithuania) V Gaubas	4	2
(Argentina) F Díaz Acosta	6	6
WC	(Germany) N McDonald	6	6
(Czech Republic) M Krumich	4	4
8	(France) H Gaston	6^{4}	6	6
Q	(Germany) M Petkovic	7^{7}	4	1
SE	(Germany) M Möller	6	5
2	(Paraguay) AD Vallejo	3	0^{r}

Quarterfinals
(Argentina) F Díaz Acosta	6	6
WC	(Germany) N McDonald	3	2
8	(France) H Gaston	6	6
SE	(Germany) M Möller	2	4

Semifinals
(Argentina) F Díaz Acosta	7	6^{4}	5
8	(France) H Gaston	5	7^{7}	7
