= 2015 Sparkassen Open – Doubles =

Doubles
- 2015 Sparkassen Open

Final
- Champion: (Belarus) Sergey Betov (Russia) Michail Elgin
- Runner-up: (Bosnia and Herzegovina) Damir Džumhur (Croatia) Franko Škugor
- Score: 3–6, 6–1, [10–5]

Events
Singles	Doubles
← 2014 ·	Sparkassen Open	· 2016 →

The 2015 Sparkassen Open - Doubles was part of a professional tennis tournament played in Braunschweig, Germany, between 6-11 July 2015 as part of the 2015 ATP Challenger Tour.

Swedish Andreas Siljeström and Slovak Igor Zelenay were the defending champions. Siljeström played alongside German Frank Moser and lost to Spanish pair Marcel Granollers and Pere Riba in the first round, while Zelenay teamed with Polish player Mateusz Kowalczyk and also lost in the first round to Austrian pair Julian Knowle and Philipp Oswald.

Belarusian Sergey Betov and Russian Michail Elgin won the title, defeating Bosnian Damir Džumhur and Croatian Franko Škugor in the final, 3–6, 6–1, [10–5].

== Seeds ==
1. (Austria) Julian Knowle / (Austria) Philipp Oswald (quarterfinals)
2. (Mexico) Santiago González / (Canada) Adil Shamasdin (semifinals)
3. (Moldova) Radu Albot / (Australia) Rameez Junaid (first round)
4. (Argentina) Guillermo Durán / (Argentina) Horacio Zeballos (quarterfinals)

== Draw ==
=== Key ===
- Q = Qualifier
- WC = Wild card
- LL = Lucky loser
- Alt = Alternate
- SE = Special exempt
- PR = Protected ranking
- ITF = ITF entry
- JE = Junior exempt
- w/o = Walkover
- r = Retired
- d = Defaulted
- SR = Special ranking

=== Draw ===
First round
1	(Austria) J Knowle (Austria) P Oswald	6	6^{5}	[11]
(Poland) M Kowalczyk (Slovakia) I Zelenay	3	7^{7}	[9]
(Bosnia and Herzegovina) D Džumhur (Croatia) F Škugor	6	2	[11]
(Netherlands) W Koolhof (Netherlands) M Middelkoop	4	6	[9]
4	(Argentina) G Durán (Argentina) H Zeballos	7	6
(Spain) P Carreño Busta (Spain) D Muñoz de la Nava	5	4
WC	(Germany) N Langer (Germany) M Marterer	1	6^{7}
(Germany) G Kretschmer (Germany) A Satschko	6	7^{9}
WC	(Germany) S Stadler (Germany) J-L Struff	7^{8}	4	[5]
WC	(Germany) A Zverev (Germany) M Zverev	6^{8}	6	[10]
(Belarus) S Betov (Russia) M Elgin	7^{7}	7^{8}
3	(Moldova) R Albot (Australia) R Junaid	6^{3}	6^{6}
(Germany) F Moser (Sweden) A Siljeström	2	4
PR	(Spain) M Granollers (Spain) P Riba	6	6
(Brazil) A Ghem (Brazil) J Souza	3	5
2	(Mexico) S González (Canada) A Shamasdin	6	7

Quarterfinals
1	(Austria) J Knowle (Austria) P Oswald	7^{7}	3	[8]
(Bosnia and Herzegovina) D Džumhur (Croatia) F Škugor	6^{3}	6	[10]
4	(Argentina) G Durán (Argentina) H Zeballos	6^{4}	7^{7}	[8]
(Germany) G Kretschmer (Germany) A Satschko	7^{7}	6^{3}	[10]
WC	(Germany) A Zverev (Germany) M Zverev	4	4
(Belarus) S Betov (Russia) M Elgin	6	6
PR	(Spain) M Granollers (Spain) P Riba	1	3
2	(Mexico) S González (Canada) A Shamasdin	6	6

Semifinals
(Bosnia and Herzegovina) D Džumhur (Croatia) F Škugor	6	6	[10]
(Germany) G Kretschmer (Germany) A Satschko	2	6	[8]
(Belarus) S Betov (Russia) M Elgin	6	6
2	(Mexico) S González (Canada) A Shamasdin	2	4

Final
(Bosnia and Herzegovina) D Džumhur (Croatia) F Škugor	6	1	[5]
(Belarus) S Betov (Russia) M Elgin	3	6	[10]
