= 2021 Sparkassen Open – Singles =

Singles
- 2021 Sparkassen Open

Final
- Champion: (Germany) Daniel Altmaier
- Runner-up: (Switzerland) Henri Laaksonen
- Score: 6–1, 6–2

Events
Singles	Doubles
- Sparkassen Open

Thiago Monteiro was the defending champion but chose not to defend his title.

Daniel Altmaier won the title after defeating Henri Laaksonen 6–1, 6–2 in the final.

== Seeds ==
1. (France) Benoît Paire (second round)
2. (Lithuania) Ričardas Berankis (withdrew)
3. (Germany) Yannick Hanfmann (second round)
4. (Slovakia) Jozef Kovalík (quarterfinals)
5. (Switzerland) Henri Laaksonen (final)
6. (Czech Republic) Tomáš Macháč (second round)
7. (India) Sumit Nagal (second round)
8. (Germany) Daniel Altmaier (champion)

== Draw ==
Key

- Q = Qualifier
- WC = Wild card
- LL = Lucky loser
- Alt = Alternate
- ITF = ITF entry
- PR = Protected ranking
- SR = Special ranking
- SE = Special exempt
- JE = Junior exempt
- JR = Junior Accelerator Programme entrant
- CO = College Accelerator Programme entrant
- NG = Next Gen Accelerator Program entrant
- w/o = Walkover
- r = Retired
- d = Defaulted

=== Finals ===
Semifinals
(Czech Republic) Vít Kopřiva	4	0
5	(Switzerland) Henri Laaksonen	6	6
8	(Germany) Daniel Altmaier	7	6
WC	(Germany) Marvin Möller	5	0

Final
5	(Switzerland) Henri Laaksonen	1	2
8	(Germany) Daniel Altmaier	6	6

=== Top half ===
First round
1/WC	(France) B Paire	6	2	7
(Argentina) G Andreozzi	4	6	5
Q	(Poland) D Michalski	2	2
(Czech Republic) V Kopřiva	6	6
(Belgium) Z Bergs	6	6
(Germany) M Marterer	2	1
(Belgium) K Coppejans	2	3
6	(Czech Republic) T Macháč	6	6
4	(Slovakia) J Kovalík	7^{7}	6
(Slovakia) F Horanský	6^{5}	3
(Australia) A Vukic	3	4
Alt	(Tunisia) M Jaziri	6	6
(Spain) N Kuhn	6	7^{7}
Alt	(Germany) M Zverev	2	6^{4}
Q	(Germany) M Rosenkranz	3	2
5	(Switzerland) H Laaksonen	6	6

Second round
1/WC	(France) B Paire	1	6	2
(Czech Republic) V Kopřiva	6	2	6
(Belgium) Z Bergs	7^{7}	5	6
6	(Czech Republic) T Macháč	6^{5}	7	4
4	(Slovakia) J Kovalík	6	7
Alt	(Tunisia) M Jaziri	1	5
(Spain) N Kuhn	4	5
5	(Switzerland) H Laaksonen	6	7

Quarterfinals
(Czech Republic) V Kopřiva	3	6	7
(Belgium) Z Bergs	6	0	5
4	(Slovakia) J Kovalík	3	2
5	(Switzerland) H Laaksonen	6	6

Semifinals
(Czech Republic) V Kopřiva	4	0
5	(Switzerland) H Laaksonen	6	6

=== Bottom half ===
First round
8	(Germany) D Altmaier	6	7
(Czech Republic) Z Kolář	2	5
(Spain) M Vilella Martínez	3	6	6
WC	(Germany) R Molleker	6	4	3
(Sweden) E Ymer	6	7
(Germany) T Kamke	3	5
(Canada) S Diez	5	6	3
3	(Germany) Y Hanfmann	7	2	6
7	(India) S Nagal	6	7^{7}
(Egypt) M Safwat	3	6^{3}
WC	(Germany) M Möller	7	6
(Russia) T Gabashvili	5	3
Q	(Switzerland) S Ehrat	6^{5}	6	6
(Germany) M Moraing	7^{7}	4	4
LL	(Germany) B Hassan	6	7^{9}
Q	(Australia) D Kelly	4	6^{7}

Second round
8	(Germany) D Altmaier	6	6
(Spain) M Vilella Martínez	3	2
(Sweden) E Ymer	2	6	6
3	(Germany) Y Hanfmann	6	3	2
7	(India) S Nagal	3	6	2
WC	(Germany) M Möller	6	1	6
Q	(Switzerland) S Ehrat	6	3	4
LL	(Germany) B Hassan	4	6	6

Quarterfinals
8	(Germany) D Altmaier	6	6
(Sweden) E Ymer	3	3
WC	(Germany) M Möller	6	6
LL	(Germany) B Hassan	4	2

Semifinals
8	(Germany) D Altmaier	7	6
WC	(Germany) M Möller	5	0
