= 2016 Sparkassen Open =

- Date: 4 – 10 July
- Edition: 23rd
- Surface: Clay
- Location: Braunschweig, Germany

Champions

Singles
- (Brazil) Thomaz Bellucci

Doubles
- (United States) James Cerretani / (Austria) Philipp Oswald
← 2015 ·	Sparkassen Open	· 2017 →

The 2016 Sparkassen Open is a professional tennis tournament played on clay courts. It is the 23rd edition of the tournament which is part of the 2016 ATP Challenger Tour. It will take place in Braunschweig, Germany between 4 and 10 July 2016.

== Singles main-draw entrants ==
=== Seeds ===
Country	Player	Rank^{1}	Seed
BRA	Thomaz Bellucci	62	1
ESP	Íñigo Cervantes	75	2
GER	Florian Mayer	80	3
GER	Jan-Lennard Struff	86	4
ARG	Leonardo Mayer	90	5
POR	Gastão Elias	92	6
ARG	Facundo Bagnis	96	7
RUS	Karen Khachanov	100	8

- ^{1} Rankings are as of June 27, 2016.

=== Other entrants ===
The following players received wildcards into the singles main draw:

- (Germany) Matthias Bachinger
- (Germany) Andreas Beck
- (Germany) Daniel Masur
- (Germany) Jan-Lennard Struff

The following players received entry as alternates:

- (France) Kenny de Schepper
- (Czech Republic) Michal Konečný
- (Czech Republic) Marek Michalička

The following players received entry from the qualifying draw:

- (Argentina) Juan Ignacio Galarza
- (Italy) Gianluca Mager
- (Croatia) Ante Pavić
- (Germany) Cedrik-Marcel Stebe

The following player received entry as a lucky loser:

- (Slovakia) Norbert Gombos

== Doubles main-draw entrants ==
=== Seeds ===
Country	Player	Country	Player	Rank^{1}	Seed
ARG	Guillermo Durán	ARG	Andrés Molteni	125	1
BLR	Aliaksandr Bury	SVK	Igor Zelenay	137	2
USA	James Cerretani	AUT	Philipp Oswald	179	3
POL	Mateusz Kowalczyk	CRO	Antonio Šančić	191	4

- ^{1} Rankings as of June 27, 2016.

=== Other entrants ===
The following pairs received wildcards into the doubles main draw:

- (Germany) Andreas Beck / (Germany) Andreas Mies
- (France) Kenny de Schepper / (France) Axel Michon
- (Argentina) Juan Ignacio Galarza / (Argentina) Leonardo Mayer

The following pairs received entries courtesy of protected rankings into the doubles main draw:

- (Germany) Matthias Bachinger / (Germany) Frank Moser
- (Australia) Rameez Junaid / (Germany) Simon Stadler

== Champions ==
=== Singles ===
- (Brazil) Thomaz Bellucci def. (Spain) Íñigo Cervantes, 6–1, 1–6, 6–3

=== Doubles ===
- (United States) James Cerretani / (Austria) Philipp Oswald def. (Poland) Mateusz Kowalczyk / (Croatia) Antonio Šančić, 4–6, 7–6^{(7–5)}, [10–2]
