= 2026 Brawo Open – Doubles =

Doubles
- 2026 Brawo Open

Final
- Champions: (Brazil) Orlando Luz (Brazil) Rafael Matos
- Runners-up: (France) Arthur Reymond (France) Luca Sanchez
- Score: 7–5, 6–2

Events
Singles	Doubles
- Brawo Open

Vasil Kirkov and Bart Stevens were the defending champions but chose not to defend their title.

Orlando Luz and Rafael Matos won the title after defeating Arthur Reymond and Luca Sanchez 7–5, 6–2 in the final.

== Seeds ==
1. (Brazil) Orlando Luz / (Brazil) Rafael Matos (champions)
2. (Brazil) Marcelo Demoliner / (Czech Republic) Matěj Vocel (semifinals)
3. (Mexico) Santiago González / (Ecuador) Diego Hidalgo (quarterfinals)
4. (France) Arthur Reymond / (France) Luca Sanchez (final)

== Draw ==
Key

- Q = Qualifier
- WC = Wild card
- LL = Lucky loser
- Alt = Alternate
- ITF = ITF entry
- PR = Protected ranking
- SR = Special ranking
- SE = Special exempt
- JE = Junior exempt
- JR = Junior Accelerator Programme entrant
- CO = College Accelerator Programme entrant
- NG = Next Gen Accelerator Program entrant
- w/o = Walkover
- r = Retired
- d = Defaulted

First round
1	(Brazil) O Luz (Brazil) R Matos	6	6
(Uruguay) A Behar (Australia) M Romios	2	4
(Germany) John Sperle (Latvia) R Strombachs	6^{5}	6	[10]
(Spain) Ignasi Forcano (Netherlands) M Vervoort	7^{7}	3	[8]
3	(Mexico) S González (Ecuador) D Hidalgo	6	6
(Germany) N McDonald (Germany) J Opitz	3	0
(United States) Reid Jarvis (United States) Jamie Vance	4	3
(Poland) F Pieczonka (Czech Republic) M Vrbenský	6	6
I Liutarevich (Mexico) M Reyes-Varela	6	6
(Spain) B Pujol Navarro (Spain) D Vega Hernández	3	4
WC	(Germany) Vincent Marysko (Germany) M Schönhaus	6^{6}	3
4	(France) A Reymond (France) L Sanchez	7^{8}	6
(India) A Chandrasekar (Japan) T Yuzuki	6	3	[5]
(Czech Republic) F Duda (United States) B Kittay	3	6	[10]
(France) K de Schepper (Spain) A Sánchez Quílez	1	4
2	(Brazil) M Demoliner (Czech Republic) M Vocel	6	6

Quarterfinals
1	(Brazil) O Luz (Brazil) R Matos	7	6
(Germany) J Sperle (Latvia) R Strombachs	5	3
3	(Mexico) S González (Ecuador) D Hidalgo	6	6^{0}	[8]
(Poland) F Pieczonka (Czech Republic) M Vrbenský	3	7^{7}	[10]
I Liutarevich (Mexico) M Reyes-Varela	3	7^{7}	[6]
4	(France) A Reymond (France) L Sanchez	6	6^{4}	[10]
(Czech Republic) F Duda (United States) B Kittay	3	1
2	(Brazil) M Demoliner (Czech Republic) M Vocel	6	6

Semifinals
1	(Brazil) O Luz (Brazil) R Matos	6	6
(Poland) F Pieczonka (Czech Republic) M Vrbenský	2	2
4	(France) A Reymond (France) L Sanchez	6	3	[10]
2	(Brazil) M Demoliner (Czech Republic) M Vocel	4	6	[8]

Final
1	(Brazil) O Luz (Brazil) R Matos	7	6
4	(France) A Reymond (France) L Sanchez	5	2
