= 2014 Sparkassen Open – Doubles =

Doubles
- 2014 Sparkassen Open

Final
- Champion: (Sweden) Andreas Siljeström (Slovakia) Igor Zelenay
- Runner-up: (Australia) Rameez Junaid (Slovakia) Michal Mertiňák
- Score: 7–5, 6–4

Events
| Singles | Doubles |
| ← 2013 · | Sparkassen Open | · 2015 → |

Tomasz Bednarek and Mateusz Kowalczyk were the two-time defending champions, but Bednarek did not participate that year. Kowalczyk played alongside Artem Sitak and they lost in the First Round to Adil Shamasdin and Franko Škugor.

Andreas Siljeström and Igor Zelenay won the title, defeating Rameez Junaid and Michal Mertiňák in the final, 7–5, 6–4.

== Seeds ==
1. (Colombia) Robert Farah / (Austria) Philipp Oswald (first round)
2. (Germany) Gero Kretschmer / (Germany) Alexander Satschko (first round)
3. (Australia) Rameez Junaid / (Slovakia) Michal Mertiňák (final)
4. (Poland) Mateusz Kowalczyk / (New Zealand) Artem Sitak (first round)

== Draw ==
=== Key ===
- Q = Qualifier
- WC = Wild card
- LL = Lucky loser
- Alt = Alternate
- SE = Special exempt
- PR = Protected ranking
- ITF = ITF entry
- JE = Junior exempt
- w/o = Walkover
- r = Retired
- d = Defaulted
- SR = Special ranking

=== Draw ===
First round
1 | (Colombia) R Farad (Austria) P Oswald | 6^{4} | 5
(Bosnia and Herzegovina) D Džumhur (Serbia) G Tošić | 7^{7} | 7
(Brazil) M Demoliner (Germany) P Marx | 6 | 7
WC | (Czech Republic) Michal Konečný (Czech Republic) Marek Pešička | 3 | 5
3 | (Australia) R Junaid (Slovakia) M Mertiňák | 7^{9} | 6
(Moldova) R Albot (Brazil) J Souza | 6^{7} | 4
WC | (India) S Balaji (Germany) P Petzschner | 7^{7} | 3 | [5]
WC | (Germany) D Masur (Germany) A Zverev | 6^{5} | 6 | [10]
(Sweden) A Siljeström (Slovakia) I Zelenay | 2 | 6 | [10]
Alt | (Belarus) U Ignatik (Czech Republic) J Pospíšil | 6 | 4 | [4]
(Canada) A Shamasdin (Croatia) F Skugor | 7 | 6
4 | (Poland) M Kowalczyk (New Zealand) A Sitak | 5 | 2
(Belarus) S Betov (Belarus) A Bury | 5 | 3
(Colombia) N Barrientos (Colombia) JC Spir | 7 | 6
(United States) J Cerretani (Germany) F Moser | 7^{7} | 4 | [10]
2 | (Germany) G Kretschmer (Germany) A Satschko | 6^{4} | 6 | [6]

Quarterfinals
(Bosnia and Herzegovina) D Džumhur (Serbia) G Tošić | 1 | 1
(Brazil) M Demoliner (Germany) P Marx | 6 | 6
3 | (Australia) R Junaid (Slovakia) M Mertiňák | 6 | 7
(Germany) D Masur (Germany) A Zverev | 3 | 5
(Sweden) A Siljeström (Slovakia) I Zelenay | 6 | 6
(Canada) A Shamasdin (Croatia) F Skugor | 4 | 4
(Colombia) N Barrientos (Colombia) JC Spir | 6^{2} | 6 | [4]
(United States) J Cerretani (Germany) F Moser | 7^{7} | 4 | [10]

Semifinals
(Brazil) M Demoliner (Germany) P Marx | 2 | 5
3 | (Australia) R Junaid (Slovakia) M Mertiňák | 6 | 7
(Sweden) A Siljeström (Slovakia) I Zelenay | 7^{7} | 4 | [11]
(United States) J Cerretani (Germany) F Moser | 6^{2} | 6 | [4]

Final
3 | (Australia) R Junaid (Slovakia) M Mertiňák | 5 | 4
(Sweden) A Siljeström (Slovakia) I Zelenay | 7 | 6
