= 2019 Sparkassen Open – Singles =

Singles
- 2019 Sparkassen Open

Final
- Champion: (Brazil) Thiago Monteiro
- Runner-up: (Germany) Tobias Kamke
- Score: 7–6^{(8–6)}, 6–1

Events
Singles	Doubles
- Sparkassen Open

Yannick Hanfmann was the defending champion but lost in the second round to Casper Ruud.

Thiago Monteiro won the title after defeating Tobias Kamke 7–6^{(8–6)}, 6–1 in the final.

== Seeds ==
All seeds receive a bye into the second round.

1. (Norway) Casper Ruud (quarterfinals)
2. (Bolivia) Hugo Dellien (second round)
3. (Switzerland) Henri Laaksonen (semifinals)
4. (Italy) Stefano Travaglia (second round)
5. (Poland) Kamil Majchrzak (third round)
6. (Brazil) Thiago Monteiro (champion)
7. (Sweden) Elias Ymer (second round)
8. (Spain) Pedro Martínez (second round)
9. (Czech Republic) Lukáš Rosol (quarterfinals)
10. (Austria) Sebastian Ofner (second round)
11. (Italy) Gianluca Mager (third round)
12. (Belgium) Kimmer Coppejans (second round)
13. (Germany) Rudolf Molleker (second round)
14. (Germany) Dustin Brown (withdrew)
15. (Germany) Oscar Otte (second round, retired)
16. (Argentina) Marco Trungelliti (third round)

== Draw ==
Key

- Q = Qualifier
- WC = Wild card
- LL = Lucky loser
- Alt = Alternate
- ITF = ITF entry
- PR = Protected ranking
- SR = Special ranking
- SE = Special exempt
- JE = Junior exempt
- JR = Junior Accelerator Programme entrant
- CO = College Accelerator Programme entrant
- NG = Next Gen Accelerator Program entrant
- w/o = Walkover
- r = Retired
- d = Defaulted

=== Finals ===
Quarterfinals
1	(Norway) Casper Ruud	4	7^{9}	3
6	(Brazil) Thiago Monteiro	6	6^{7}	6
3	(Switzerland) Henri Laaksonen	7^{7}	6^{4}	6
9	(Czech Republic) Lukáš Rosol	6^{4}	7^{7}	3
(Hungary) Attila Balázs	6	4	4
(Germany) Tobias Kamke	1	6	6
(Slovakia) Jozef Kovalík	6^{5}	6^{5}
ITF	(Spain) J Barranco Cosano	7^{7}	7^{7}

Semifinals
6	(Brazil) Thiago Monteiro	6	6
3	(Switzerland) Henri Laaksonen	4	4
(Germany) Tobias Kamke	7	6
ITF	(Spain) J Barranco Cosano	5	0

Final
6	(Brazil) Thiago Monteiro	7^{8}	6
(Germany) Tobias Kamke	6^{6}	1

=== Top half ===
==== Section 1 ====
First round
WC	(Germany) J Lenz	5	4
(Germany) Y Hanfmann	7	6
ITF	(Egypt) K-M Maamoun	4	6^{4}
WC	(Germany) D Altmaier	6	7^{7}
(Austria) L Miedler	6	7^{7}
(Netherlands) T de Bakker	4	6^{2}
(Canada) S Diez	6	3	6
(Russia) A Vatutin	4	6	2

Second round
1	(Norway) C Ruud	6^{5}	7	7
(Germany) Y Hanfmann	7^{7}	5	5
WC	(Germany) D Altmaier	6	1
15	(Germany) O Otte	3	0^{r}
11	(Italy) G Mager	7	6
(Austria) L Miedler	5	3
(Canada) S Diez	4	3
6	(Brazil) T Monteiro	6	6

Third round
1	(Norway) C Ruud	6	7
WC	(Germany) D Altmaier	3	5
11	(Italy) G Mager	6^{4}	6	6^{5}
6	(Brazil) T Monteiro	7^{7}	4	7^{7}

Quarterfinals
1	(Norway) C Ruud	4	7^{9}	3
6	(Brazil) T Monteiro	6	6^{7}	6

==== Section 2 ====
First round
WC	(Germany) D Masur	4	4
Q	(France) G Blancaneaux	6	6
(Spain) N Kuhn	3	6	5
(Germany) M Moraing	6	2	7
(France) A Müller	6^{3}	6^{3}
(Netherlands) T Griekspoor	7^{7}	7^{7}
(Spain) C Taberner	7^{7}	6
ITF	(Germany) Peter Heller	6^{4}	1

Second round
3	(Switzerland) H Laaksonen	6	7
Q	(France) G Blancaneaux	3	5
(Germany) M Moraing	6^{4}	6	6
LL	(Finland) E Ruusuvuori	7^{7}	4	3
9	(Czech Republic) L Rosol	7	2	6
(Netherlands) T Griekspoor	5	6	3
(Spain) C Taberner	6^{2}	3
5	(Poland) K Majchrzak	7^{7}	6

Third round
3	(Switzerland) H Laaksonen	4	6	6
(Germany) M Moraing	6	3	4
9	(Czech Republic) L Rosol	4	6	6
5	(Poland) K Majchrzak	6	4	1

Quarterfinals
3	(Switzerland) H Laaksonen	7^{7}	6^{4}	6
9	(Czech Republic) L Rosol	6^{4}	7^{7}	3

=== Bottom half ===
==== Section 3 ====
First round
(Hungary) A Balázs	6	6
(Spain) B Zapata Miralles	1	1
(Argentina) P Cachin	7	6
ITF	(Netherlands) T van Rijthoven	5	1
WC	(Germany) C-M Stebe	6	5	4
WC	(Germany) J Härteis	3	7	6
Q	(Germany) Niklas Guttau	5	4
(Germany) T Kamke	7	6

Second round
7	(Sweden) E Ymer	3	2
(Hungary) A Balázs	6	6
(Argentina) P Cachin	6	6
12	(Belgium) K Coppejans	0	1
13	(Germany) R Molleker	6	5	1
WC	(Germany) J Härteis	3	7	6
(Germany) T Kamke	6	7^{7}
4	(Italy) S Travaglia	3	6^{4}

Third round
(Hungary) A Balázs	6	4
(Argentina) P Cachin	2	4^{r}
WC	(Germany) J Härteis	5	1
(Germany) T Kamke	7	6

Quarterfinals
(Hungary) A Balázs	6	4	4
(Germany) T Kamke	1	6	6

==== Section 4 ====
First round
(Slovakia) J Kovalík	6	6^{5}	6
Alt	(Germany) B Hassan	4	7^{7}	4
Alt	(Argentina) R Olivo	1	4
ITF	(Netherlands) B van de Zandschulp	6	6
Alt	(Ecuador) G Escobar	6	6
(Portugal) J Domingues	1	3
(Germany) M Marterer
ITF	(Spain) J Barranco Cosano	w/o

Second round
8	(Spain) P Martínez	1	3
(Slovakia) J Kovalík	6	6
ITF	(Netherlands) B van de Zandschulp	6	5	6
10	(Austria) S Ofner	1	7	3
16	(Argentina) M Trungelliti	7^{10}	6
Alt	(Ecuador) G Escobar	6^{8}	4
ITF	(Spain) J Barranco Cosano	6	7^{7}
2	(Bolivia) H Dellien	1	6^{3}

Third round
(Slovakia) J Kovalík	6	6
ITF	(Netherlands) B van de Zandschulp	1	3
16	(Argentina) M Trungelliti	2	4
ITF	(Spain) J Barranco Cosano	6	6

Quarterfinals
(Slovakia) J Kovalík	6^{5}	6^{5}
ITF	(Spain) J Barranco Cosano	7^{7}	7^{7}
