= 2016 Sparkassen Open – Doubles =

Doubles
- 2016 Sparkassen Open

Final
- Champion: (United States) James Cerretani (Austria) Philipp Oswald
- Runner-up: (Poland) Mateusz Kowalczyk (Croatia) Antonio Šančić
- Score: 4–6, 7–6^{(7–5)}, [10–2]

Events
Singles	Doubles
← 2015 ·	Sparkassen Open	· 2017 →

Sergey Betov and Mikhail Elgin were the defending champions but only Betov returned, partnering Tomasz Bednarek. Betov lost in the quarterfinals to Mateusz Kowalczyk and Antonio Šančić.

James Cerretani and Philipp Oswald won the title after defeating Mateusz Kowalczyk and Antonio Šančić 4–6, 7–6^{(7–5)}, [10–2] in the final.

== Seeds ==
1. (Argentina) Guillermo Durán / (Argentina) Andrés Molteni (first round)
2. (Belarus) Aliaksandr Bury / (Slovakia) Igor Zelenay (first round)
3. (United States) James Cerretani / (Austria) Philipp Oswald (champions)
4. (Poland) Mateusz Kowalczyk / (Croatia) Antonio Šančić (final)

== Draw ==
=== Key ===
- Q = Qualifier
- WC = Wild card
- LL = Lucky loser
- Alt = Alternate
- SE = Special exempt
- PR = Protected ranking
- ITF = ITF entry
- JE = Junior exempt
- w/o = Walkover
- r = Retired
- d = Defaulted
- SR = Special ranking

First round
1	(Argentina) G Durán (Argentina) A Molteni	4	6	[7]
WC	(Argentina) Juan Ignacio Galarza (Argentina) L Mayer	6	2	[10]
PR	(Australia) R Junaid (Germany) S Stadler	6	6
WC	(Germany) A Beck (Germany) A Mies	2	2
4	(Poland) M Kowalczyk (Croatia) A Šančić	2	6	[10]
(Germany) K Krawietz (Croatia) D Marcan	6	3	[4]
(Spain) Í Cervantes (Netherlands) M Vervoort	3	2
(Poland) T Bednarek (Belarus) S Betov	6	6
(Netherlands) S Arends (Austria) T-S Weissborn	6	7^{7}
(Mexico) MÁ Reyes-Varela (Germany) A Satschko	2	6^{4}
PR	(Germany) M Bachinger (Germany) F Moser	4	4
3	(United States) J Cerretani (Austria) P Oswald	6	6
WC	(France) K de Schepper (France) A Michon	7	6^{3}	[10]
(Moldova) R Albot (Germany) J-L Struff	5	7^{7}	[3]
(Argentina) F Bagnis (Russia) K Khachanov	6	3	[15]
2	(Belarus) A Bury (Slovakia) I Zelenay	2	6	[13]

Quarterfinals
WC	(Argentina) JI Galarza (Argentina) L Mayer	6	6
PR	(Australia) R Junaid (Germany) S Stadler	4	3
4	(Poland) M Kowalczyk (Croatia) A Šančić	6	6^{2}	[10]
(Poland) T Bednarek (Belarus) S Betov	1	7^{7}	[3]
(Netherlands) S Arends (Austria) T-S Weissborn	4	1
3	(United States) J Cerretani (Austria) P Oswald	6	6
WC	(France) K de Schepper (France) A Michon	6	2	[8]
(Argentina) F Bagnis (Russia) K Khachanov	3	6	[10]

Semifinals
WC	(Argentina) JI Galarza (Argentina) L Mayer	4	3
4	(Poland) M Kowalczyk (Croatia) A Šančić	6	6
3	(United States) J Cerretani (Austria) P Oswald	7	7^{7}
(Argentina) F Bagnis (Russia) K Khachanov	5	6^{3}

Final
4	(Poland) M Kowalczyk (Croatia) A Šančić	6	6^{5}	[2]
3	(United States) J Cerretani (Austria) P Oswald	4	7^{7}	[10]
