= 2024 Brawo Open – Singles =

Singles
- 2024 Brawo Open

Final
- Champion: (Spain) Roberto Carballés Baena
- Runner-up: (Netherlands) Botic van de Zandschulp
- Score: 6–1, 6–3

Events
Singles	Doubles
- Brawo Open

Franco Agamenone was the defending champion but lost in the first round of qualifying to Yanaki Milev.

Roberto Carballés Baena won the title after defeating Botic van de Zandschulp 6–1, 6–3 in the final.

== Seeds ==
1. (Spain) Roberto Carballés Baena (champion)
2. (India) Sumit Nagal (second round)
3. (Brazil) Thiago Seyboth Wild (first round, retired)
4. (Germany) Daniel Altmaier (first round)
5. (Netherlands) Botic van de Zandschulp (final)
6. (Colombia) Daniel Elahi Galán (quarterfinals)
7. (Bosnia and Herzegovina) Damir Džumhur (withdrew)
8. (Chile) Cristian Garín (quarterfinals)

== Draw ==
Key

- Q = Qualifier
- WC = Wild card
- LL = Lucky loser
- Alt = Alternate
- ITF = ITF entry
- PR = Protected ranking
- SR = Special ranking
- SE = Special exempt
- JE = Junior exempt
- JR = Junior Accelerator Programme entrant
- CO = College Accelerator Programme entrant
- NG = Next Gen Accelerator Program entrant
- w/o = Walkover
- r = Retired
- d = Defaulted

=== Finals ===
Semifinals
1	(Spain) Roberto Carballés Baena	6	6
(France) Pierre-Hugues Herbert	4	1
5	(Netherlands) Botic van de Zandschulp	6	6^{5}	6
(Argentina) Pedro Cachín	2	7^{7}	3

Final
1	(Spain) Roberto Carballés Baena	6	6
5	(Netherlands) Botic van de Zandschulp	1	3

=== Top half ===
First round
1	(Spain) R Carballés Baena	6	2	6
WC	(Germany) R Molleker	1	6	3
(Slovakia) L Klein	6^{3}	7^{7}	6
(Slovakia) J Kovalík	7^{7}	6^{3}	1
(Austria) J Rodionov	6	5	3
(Kazakhstan) M Kukushkin	3	7	6
(Croatia) M Dodig	6	3	4
8	(Chile) C Garín	4	6	6
3	(Brazil) T Seyboth Wild	2	0^{r}
WC	(Germany) N Kuhn	6	1
Q	(Germany) T Gentzsch	6	4	4
(France) P-H Herbert	2	6	6
Q	(Netherlands) Stijn Slump	4	6^{11}
(Croatia) D Ajduković	6	7^{13}
(Kazakhstan) D Yevseyev	1	6	4
LL	(Spain) C Sánchez Jover	6	2	6

Second round
1	(Spain) R Carballés Baena	6	6
(Slovakia) L Klein	2	4
(Kazakhstan) M Kukushkin	6	2	3
8	(Chile) C Garín	4	6	6
WC	(Germany) N Kuhn	1	5
(France) P-H Herbert	6	7
(Croatia) D Ajduković	6	6
LL	(Spain) C Sánchez Jover	4	4

Quarterfinals
1	(Spain) R Carballés Baena	4	6	7
8	(Chile) C Garín	6	3	5
(France) P-H Herbert	6	6
(Croatia) D Ajduković	3	4

Semifinals
1	(Spain) R Carballés Baena	6	6
(France) P-H Herbert	4	1

=== Bottom half ===
First round
5	(Netherlands) B van de Zandschulp	6	6
Alt	(France) M Martineau	2	4
Q	(Belgium) M Geerts	1	4
(Lebanon) B Hassan	6	6
Alt	(Germany) H Squire	5	7^{7}	7^{7}
SE	(Germany) D Masur	7	6^{4}	6^{5}
Q	(Germany) MH Rehberg	2	7^{7}	6
4/WC	(Germany) D Altmaier	6	6^{1}	3
6	(Colombia) DE Galán	6	6
Q	(Germany) M Möller	3	4
(Peru) JP Varillas	7^{7}	6
Q	(Germany) S Fanselow	6^{2}	3
(Argentina) P Cachín	6	6
(France) G Barrère	3	4
(Brazil) F Meligeni Alves	1	4
2	(India) S Nagal	6	6

Second round
5	(Netherlands) B van de Zandschulp	6	6
(Lebanon) B Hassan	1	2
Alt	(Germany) H Squire	6^{4}	6	6
Q	(Germany) MH Rehberg	7^{7}	2	4
6	(Colombia) DE Galán	7^{7}	6
(Peru) JP Varillas	6^{2}	4
(Argentina) P Cachín	6	7
2	(India) S Nagal	4	5

Quarterfinals
5	(Netherlands) B van de Zandschulp	7	7^{7}
Alt	(Germany) H Squire	5	6^{2}
6	(Colombia) DE Galán	4	4
(Argentina) P Cachín	6	6

Semifinals
5	(Netherlands) B van de Zandschulp	6	6^{5}	6
(Argentina) P Cachín	2	7^{7}	3
