= 2022 Brawo Open =

- Date: 4–9 July
- Edition: 28th
- Surface: Clay
- Location: Braunschweig, Germany

Champions

Singles
- (Germany) Jan-Lennard Struff

Doubles
- (Brazil) Marcelo Demoliner / (Germany) Jan-Lennard Struff
← 2021 ·	Brawo Open	· 2023 →

The 2022 Brawo Open was a professional tennis tournament played on clay courts. It was the 28th edition of the tournament which was part of the 2022 ATP Challenger Tour. It took place in Braunschweig, Germany between 4 and 9 July 2022.

== Singles main-draw entrants ==
=== Seeds ===
Country	Player	Rank^{1}	Seed
ESP	Pedro Martínez	50	1
ARG	Federico Coria	67	2
ARG	Federico Delbonis	84	3
ESP	Bernabé Zapata Miralles	90	4
SUI	Henri Laaksonen	96	5
~~ESP~~	~~Carlos Taberner~~	~~98~~	~~6~~
COL	Daniel Elahi Galán	109	7
PER	Juan Pablo Varillas	110	8

- ^{1} Rankings are as of 27 June 2022.

=== Other entrants ===
The following players received wildcards into the singles main draw:

- (Spain) Pedro Martínez
- (Germany) Rudolf Molleker
- (Germany) Marko Topo

The following players received entry into the singles main draw as special exempts:

- (Lebanon) Benjamin Hassan
- (China) Zhang Zhizhen

The following players received entry into the singles main draw as alternates:

- (Italy) Marco Cecchinato
- (India) Sumit Nagal

The following players received entry from the qualifying draw:

- (Bulgaria) Adrian Andreev
- (Brazil) Oscar José Gutierrez
- (France) Maxime Janvier
- (Slovakia) Jozef Kovalík
- (Ukraine) Oleksii Krutykh
- (Poland) Kacper Żuk

The following player received entry as a lucky loser:

- (Belgium) Michael Geerts

== Champions ==
=== Singles ===
- (Germany) Jan-Lennard Struff def. (Germany) Maximilian Marterer 6–2, 6–2.

=== Doubles ===
- (Brazil) Marcelo Demoliner / (Germany) Jan-Lennard Struff def. (Czech Republic) Roman Jebavý / (Czech Republic) Adam Pavlásek 6–4, 7–5.
