= 2023 Brawo Open =

- Date: 10–15 July
- Edition: 29th
- Surface: Clay
- Location: Braunschweig, Germany

Champions

Singles
- (Italy) Franco Agamenone

Doubles
- (France) Pierre-Hugues Herbert / (France) Arthur Reymond
← 2022 ·	Brawo Open	· 2024 →

The 2023 Brawo Open was a professional tennis tournament played on clay courts. It was the 29th edition of the tournament which was part of the 2023 ATP Challenger Tour. It took place in Braunschweig, Germany between 10 and 15 July 2023.

== Singles main-draw entrants ==
=== Seeds ===
Country	Player	Rank^{1}	Seed
GER	Daniel Altmaier	66	1
SVK	Alex Molčan	83	2
ITA	Marco Cecchinato	89	3
ARG	Federico Coria	104	4
	Pavel Kotov	105	5
JPN	Taro Daniel	106	6
ESP	Jaume Munar	109	7
ESP	Pedro Martínez	122	8

- ^{1} Rankings are as of 3 July 2023.

=== Other entrants ===
The following players received wildcards into the singles main draw:

- (Germany) Daniel Altmaier
- (Germany) Rudolf Molleker
- (Germany) Marko Topo

The following player received entry into the singles main draw using a protected ranking:

- (France) Pierre-Hugues Herbert

The following players received entry into the singles main draw as alternates:

- (Switzerland) Henri Laaksonen
- (Italy) Stefano Travaglia

The following players received entry from the qualifying draw:

- (France) Constantin Bittoun Kouzmine
- (Lebanon) Benjamin Hassan
- (Denmark) August Holmgren
- (Germany) Daniel Masur
- (Spain) Carlos Taberner
- (Kazakhstan) Denis Yevseyev

The following player received entry as a lucky loser:

- (Sweden) Karl Friberg

== Champions ==
=== Singles ===
- (Italy) Franco Agamenone def. Pavel Kotov 7–5, 6–3.

=== Doubles ===
- (France) Pierre-Hugues Herbert / (France) Arthur Reymond def. (India) Rithvik Choudary Bollipalli / (India) Arjun Kadhe 7–6^{(9–7)}, 6–4.
