= 2017 Sparkassen Open – Doubles =

Doubles
- 2017 Sparkassen Open

Final
- Champions: (Austria) Julian Knowle (Slovakia) Igor Zelenay
- Runners-up: (Germany) Kevin Krawietz (Germany) Gero Kretschmer
- Score: 6–3, 7–6^{(7–3)}

Events
Singles	Doubles
← 2016 ·	Sparkassen Open	· 2018 →

James Cerretani and Philipp Oswald were the defending champions but only Cerretani chose to defend his title, partnering Max Schnur. Cerretani lost in the first round to Sander Arends and Matwé Middelkoop.

Julian Knowle and Igor Zelenay won the title after defeating Kevin Krawietz and Gero Kretschmer 6–3, 7–6^{(7–3)} in the final.

== Seeds ==
1. (Argentina) Guillermo Durán / (Argentina) Andrés Molteni (first round)
2. (Brazil) Rogério Dutra Silva / (Chile) Julio Peralta (first round)
3. (United States) James Cerretani / (United States) Max Schnur (first round)
4. (Croatia) Dino Marcan / (Austria) Tristan-Samuel Weissborn (first round)

== Draw ==
=== Key ===
- Q = Qualifier
- WC = Wild card
- LL = Lucky loser
- Alt = Alternate
- ITF = ITF entry
- PR = Protected ranking
- SR = Special ranking
- SE = Special exempt
- JE = Junior exempt
- JR = Junior Accelerator Programme entrant
- CO = College Accelerator Programme entrant
- NG = Next Gen Accelerator Program entrant
- w/o = Walkover
- r = Retired
- d = Defaulted

First round
1	(Argentina) G Durán (Argentina) A Molteni	3	3
(Italy) M Cecchinato (Brazil) T Monteiro	6	6
WC	(Poland) T Bednarek (Netherlands) D Pel	6	5	[6]
(Germany) K Krawietz (Germany) G Kretschmer	3	7	[10]
3	(United States) J Cerretani (United States) M Schnur	3	6	[11]
(Netherlands) S Arends (Netherlands) M Middelkoop	6	3	[13]
(Hungary) A Balázs (Hungary) M Fucsovics	7	5	[10]
(Moldova) R Albot (Ukraine) D Molchanov	5	7	[6]
(Poland) M Kowalczyk (Germany) A Mies	6	6
WC	(Australia) R Junaid (Switzerland) L Margaroli	4	1
(Uruguay) A Behar (Belarus) A Bury	7^{7}	6
4	(Croatia) D Marcan (Austria) T-S Weissborn	6^{4}	3
WC	(Germany) George von Massow (Germany) L Wessels	4	4
(Belarus) U Ignatik (Czech Republic) J Šátral	6	6
(Austria) J Knowle (Slovakia) I Zelenay	7^{7}	6
2	(Brazil) R Dutra Silva (Chile) J Peralta	6^{3}	4

Quarterfinals
(Italy) M Cecchinato (Brazil) T Monteiro	1	3
(Germany) K Krawietz (Germany) G Kretschmer	6	6
(Netherlands) S Arends (Netherlands) M Middelkoop	6	6
(Hungary) A Balázs (Hungary) M Fucsovics	3	1
(Poland) M Kowalczyk (Germany) A Mies	6	3	[10]
(Uruguay) A Behar (Belarus) A Bury	2	6	[8]
(Belarus) U Ignatik (Czech Republic) J Šátral	1	4
(Austria) J Knowle (Slovakia) I Zelenay	6	6

Semifinals
(Germany) K Krawietz (Germany) G Kretschmer	7	6
(Netherlands) S Arends (Netherlands) M Middelkoop	5	4
(Poland) M Kowalczyk (Germany) A Mies	6^{5}	6	[8]
(Austria) J Knowle (Slovakia) I Zelenay	7^{7}	1	[10]

Final
(Germany) K Krawietz (Germany) G Kretschmer	3	6^{3}
(Austria) J Knowle (Slovakia) I Zelenay	6	7^{7}
