= 2023 Brawo Open – Doubles =

Doubles
- 2023 Brawo Open

Final
- Champions: (France) Pierre-Hugues Herbert (France) Arthur Reymond
- Runners-up: (India) Rithvik Choudary Bollipalli (India) Arjun Kadhe
- Score: 7–6^{(9–7)}, 6–4

Events
Singles	Doubles
- Brawo Open

Marcelo Demoliner and Jan-Lennard Struff were the defending champions but chose not to defend their title.

Pierre-Hugues Herbert and Arthur Reymond won the title after defeating Rithvik Choudary Bollipalli and Arjun Kadhe 7–6^{(9–7)}, 6–4 in the final.

== Seeds ==
1. (Netherlands) Sander Arends / (Ecuador) Gonzalo Escobar (quarterfinals)
2. (Germany) Constantin Frantzen / (Germany) Hendrik Jebens (first round)
3. (India) Ramkumar Ramanathan / (Spain) David Vega Hernández (quarterfinals)
4. (Spain) Sergio Martos Gornés / (Czech Republic) Petr Nouza (first round)

== Draw ==
Key

- Q = Qualifier
- WC = Wild card
- LL = Lucky loser
- Alt = Alternate
- ITF = ITF entry
- PR = Protected ranking
- SR = Special ranking
- SE = Special exempt
- JE = Junior exempt
- JR = Junior Accelerator Programme entrant
- CO = College Accelerator Programme entrant
- NG = Next Gen Accelerator Program entrant
- w/o = Walkover
- r = Retired
- d = Defaulted

First round
(Germany) R Molleker (Germany) H Squire	6^{6}	2
PR	(France) P-H Herbert (France) A Reymond	7^{8}	6
4	(Spain) S Martos Gornés (Czech Republic) P Nouza	7^{7}	4	[6]
I Liutarevich (Ukraine) V Manafov	6^{3}	6	[10]
(Italy) F Agamenone (Italy) F Passaro	6	5	[12]
(Kazakhstan) T Skatov (Spain) C Taberner	4	7	[14]
(Spain) O Roca Batalla (Germany) Timo Stodder	4	3
(India) RC Bollipalli (India) A Kadhe	6	6
(France) G Blancaneaux (Israel) D Cukierman	6	2	[3]
3	(India) R Ramanathan (Spain) D Vega Hernández	2	6	[10]
(Lebanon) B Hassan (Germany) Niklas Schell	2	4
(France) C Bittoun Kouzmine; P Kotov	6	6
(Spain) Í Cervantes (Spain) P Martínez	3	7^{8}	[10]
2	(Germany) C Frantzen (Germany) H Jebens	6	6^{6}	[5]

Quarterfinals
1	(Netherlands) S Arends (Ecuador) G Escobar	3	2
PR	(France) P-H Herbert (France) A Reymond	6	6
I Liutarevich (Ukraine) V Manafov	6	6^{3}	[9]
(Kazakhstan) T Skatov (Spain) C Taberner	0	7^{7}	[11]
(India) RC Bollipalli (India) A Kadhe	6	6
3	(India) R Ramanathan (Spain) D Vega Hernández	1	2
(France) C Bittoun Kouzmine; P Kotov	6	6
(Spain) Í Cervantes (Spain) P Martínez	3	2

Semifinals
PR	(France) P-H Herbert (France) A Reymond	w/o
(Kazakhstan) T Skatov (Spain) C Taberner
(India) RC Bollipalli (India) A Kadhe	6^{5}	6	[10]
(France) C Bittoun Kouzmine; P Kotov	7^{7}	3	[5]

Final
PR	(France) P-H Herbert (France) A Reymond	7^{9}	6
(India) RC Bollipalli (India) A Kadhe	6^{7}	4
