= 2026 Brawo Open =

- Date: 6–12 July
- Edition: 32nd
- Surface: Clay
- Location: Braunschweig, Germany

Champions

Singles
- (United Kingdom) Jan Choinski

Doubles
- (Brazil) Orlando Luz / (Brazil) Rafael Matos
- Brawo Open

The 2026 Brawo Open was a professional tennis tournament played on clay courts. It was the 32nd edition of the tournament which was part of the 2026 ATP Challenger Tour. It took place in Braunschweig, Germany between 6 and 12 July 2026.

== Singles main-draw entrants ==
=== Seeds ===
Country	Player	Rank^{1}	Seed
ARG	Román Andrés Burruchaga	65	1
PAR	Daniel Vallejo	72	2
~~ARG~~	~~Francisco Comesaña~~	~~91~~	~~3~~
GBR	Jan Choinski	100	4
AUT	Sebastian Ofner	110	5
GEO	Nikoloz Basilashvili	111	6
CZE	Dalibor Svrčina	112	7
FRA	Hugo Gaston	118	8

- ^{1} Rankings are as of 29 June 2026.

=== Other entrants ===
The following players received wildcards into the singles main draw:

- (Germany) Niels McDonald
- (Germany) Benito Sanchez Martinez
- (Germany) Max Schönhaus

The following player received entry into the singles main draw as a special exempt:

- (Germany) Marvin Möller

The following player received entry into the singles main draw through the Next Gen Accelerator programme:

- (France) Moïse Kouamé

The following player received entry into the singles main draw as an alternate:

- (Germany) Max Hans Rehberg

The following players received entry from the qualifying draw:

- Andrey Chepelev
- (Slovakia) Norbert Gombos
- (Bulgaria) Dimitar Kuzmanov
- (Germany) Rudolf Molleker
- (Germany) Mika Petkovic
- (Brazil) Thiago Seyboth Wild

The following player received entry as a lucky loser:

- (Italy) Samuele Pieri

== Champions ==
=== Singles ===
- (United Kingdom) Jan Choinski def. (France) Hugo Gaston 4–6, 6–0, 6–4.

=== Doubles ===
- (Brazil) Orlando Luz / (Brazil) Rafael Matos def. (France) Arthur Reymond / (France) Luca Sanchez 7–5, 6–2.
