= 2015 Sparkassen Open =

- Date: 6 – 11 July
- Edition: 22nd
- Surface: Clay
- Location: Braunschweig, Germany

Champions

Singles
- (Serbia) Filip Krajinović

Doubles
- (Belarus) Sergey Betov / (Russia) Michail Elgin
← 2014 ·	Sparkassen Open	· 2016 →

The 2015 Sparkassen Open was a professional tennis tournament played on clay courts. It was the 22nd edition of the tournament which was part of the 2015 ATP Challenger Tour. It took place in Braunschweig, Germany between 6 and 11 July 2015.

== Singles main-draw entrants ==
=== Seeds ===
Country	Player	Rank^{1}	Seed
ESP	Pablo Carreño Busta	67	1
ESP	Marcel Granollers	72	2
GER	Alexander Zverev	74	3
BRA	João Souza	81	4
BIH	Damir Džumhur	88	5
MDA	Radu Albot	108	6
ESP	Daniel Muñoz de la Nava	109	7
GER	Matthias Bachinger	110	8

- ^{1} Rankings are as of June 29, 2015.

=== Other entrants ===
The following players received wildcards into the singles main draw:

- (Germany) Florian Mayer
- (Germany) Mischa Zverev
- (Germany) Maximilian Marterer
- (Germany) Daniel Brands

The following players received entry as a special exempt into the singles main draw:

- (Germany) Nils Langer

The following players received entry with a protected ranking:

- (Spain) Pere Riba

The following players received entry as an alternate into the singles main draw:

- (Portugal) Gastão Elias

The following players received entry from the qualifying draw:

- (Brazil) Rogério Dutra Silva
- (Bulgaria) Dimitar Kuzmanov
- (Australia) Jason Kubler
- (Russia) Karen Khachanov

== Doubles main-draw entrants ==
=== Seeds ===
Country	Player	Country	Player	Rank^{1}	Seed
AUT	Julian Knowle	AUT	Philipp Oswald	91	1
CAN	Adil Shamasdin	MEX	Santiago González	113	2
MDA	Radu Albot	AUS	Rameez Junaid	139	3
ARG	Guillermo Durán	ARG	Horacio Zeballos	168	4

- ^{1} Rankings as of June 29, 2015.

=== Other entrants ===
The following pairs received wildcards into the doubles main draw:

- (Germany) Alexander Zverev / (Germany) Mischa Zverev
- (Germany) Simon Stadler / (Germany) Jan-Lennard Struff
- (Germany) Nils Langer / (Germany) Maximilian Marterer

== Champions ==
=== Singles ===
- (Serbia) Filip Krajinović def. (France) Paul-Henri Mathieu 6–2, 6–4

=== Doubles ===
- (Belarus) Sergey Betov / (Russia) Michail Elgin def. (Bosnia and Herzegovina) Damir Džumhur / (Croatia) Franko Škugor, 3–6, 6–1, [10–5]
