= 2014 Sparkassen Open – Singles =

Singles
- 2014 Sparkassen Open

Final
- Champion: (Germany) Alexander Zverev
- Runner-up: (France) Paul-Henri Mathieu
- Score: 1–6, 6–1, 6–4

Events
| Singles | Doubles |
- Sparkassen Open

Florian Mayer was the defending champion, but he did not participate this year.

Alexander Zverev won the tournament, defeating Paul-Henri Mathieu in the final, 1–6, 6–1, 6–4.

== Seeds ==
1. (Kazakhstan) Andrey Golubev (semifinals)
2. (Spain) Pablo Carreño Busta (first round)
3. (Germany) Tobias Kamke (first round)
4. (France) Paul-Henri Mathieu (final)
5. (Argentina) Diego Sebastian Schwartzman (quarterfinals)
6. (Brazil) Thomaz Bellucci (second round)
7. (Germany) Peter Gojowczyk (first round)
8. (Germany) Julian Reister (first round)

== Draw ==
Key

- Q = Qualifier
- WC = Wild card
- LL = Lucky loser
- Alt = Alternate
- ITF = ITF entry
- PR = Protected ranking
- SR = Special ranking
- SE = Special exempt
- JE = Junior exempt
- JR = Junior Accelerator Programme entrant
- CO = College Accelerator Programme entrant
- NG = Next Gen Accelerator Program entrant
- w/o = Walkover
- r = Retired
- d = Defaulted

=== Finals ===
Semifinals
1/WC | (Kazakhstan) Andrey Golubev | 2 | 3
WC | (Germany) Alexander Zverev | 6 | 6
4 | (France) Paul-Henri Mathieu | 6 | 6
SE | (Serbia) Nikola Čačić | 4 | 2

Final
WC | (Germany) Alexander Zverev | 1 | 6 | 6
4 | (France) Paul-Henri Mathieu | 6 | 1 | 4

=== Top half ===
First round
1/WC | (Kazakhstan) A Golubev | 6 | 6
(Italy) M Viola | 4 | 4
LL | (Serbia) B Pašanski | 3 | 6 | 6^{6}
WC | (Germany) M Marterer | 6 | 4 | 7^{8}
Alt | (Belarus) U Ignatik | 4 | 6 | 5
WC | (Germany) P Petzschner | 6 | 3 | 7
Q | (Slovakia) J Kovalík | 6^{2} | 3
6 | (Brazil) T Bellucci | 7^{7} | 6
3 | (Germany) T Kamke | 4 | 6^{6}
WC | (Germany) A Zverev | 6 | 7^{7}
Q | (Germany) N Langer | 6 | 6
Q | (Russia) P Davydenko | 3 | 1
Alt | (Czech Republic) J Pospíšil | 3 | 3
(Brazil) J Souza | 6 | 6
(Argentina) H Zeballos | 3 | 6 | 6
8 | (Germany) J Reister | 6 | 4 | 4

Second round
1/WC | (Kazakhstan) A Golubev | 6 | 6
WC | (Germany) M Marterer | 4 | 2
WC | (Germany) P Petzschner | 7^{7} | 6
6 | (Brazil) T Bellucci | 6^{5} | 3
WC | (Germany) A Zverev | 2 | 7^{7} | 7
Q | (Germany) N Langer | 6 | 6^{5} | 5
(Brazil) J Souza | 6^{6} | 7^{8} | 6
(Argentina) H Zeballos | 7^{8} | 6^{3} | 4

Quarterfinals
1/WC | (Kazakhstan) A Golubev | 6 | 6
WC | (Germany) P Petzschner | 4 | 4
WC | (Germany) A Zverev | 7 | 7^{7}
(Brazil) J Souza | 5 | 6^{5}

Semifinals
1/WC | (Kazakhstan) A Golubev | 2 | 3
WC | (Germany) A Zverev | 6 | 6

=== Bottom half ===
First round
7 | (Germany) P Gojowczyk | 6 | 4 | 3
(Portugal) G Elias | 2 | 6 | 6
(Netherlands) T de Bakker | 4 | 6^{5}
Alt | (Argentina) M Alund | 6 | 7^{7}
(Czech Republic) J Hájek | 0 | 2
Q | (Brazil) A Ghem | 6 | 6
(Germany) M Berrer | 6^{3} | 4
4 | (France) P-H Mathieu | 7^{7} | 6
5 | (Argentina) DS Schwartzman | 6 | 6
(Germany) D Brands | 3 | 3
(Slovakia) M Mečíř | 3 | 6 | 6
(Serbia) F Krajinović | 6 | 3 | 2
(France) P-H Herbert | 2 | 6^{2}
(Bosnia and Herzegovina) D Džumhur | 6 | 7^{7}
SE | (Serbia) N Čačić | 7^{7} | 6
2 | (Spain) P Carreño Busta | 6^{3} | 3

Second round
(Portugal) G Elias | 7 | 6
Alt | (Argentina) M Alund | 5 | 2
Q | (Brazil) A Ghem | 1 | 3
4 | (France) P-H Mathieu | 6 | 6
5 | (Argentina) DS Schwartzman | 6 | 4 | 7^{9}
(Slovakia) M Mečíř | 2 | 6 | 6^{7}
(Bosnia and Herzegovina) D Džumhur | 3 | 6^{3}
SE | (Serbia) N Čačić | 6 | 7^{7}

Quarterfinals
(Portugal) G Elias | 3 | 3
4 | (France) P-H Mathieu | 6 | 6
5 | (Argentina) DS Schwartzman | 6^{6} | 6 | 5
SE | (Serbia) N Čačić | 7^{8} | 4 | 7

Semifinals
4 | (France) P-H Mathieu | 6 | 6
SE | (Serbia) N Čačić | 4 | 3
