= 2024 Brawo Open =

- Date: 8–13 July
- Edition: 30th
- Surface: Clay
- Location: Braunschweig, Germany

Champions

Singles
- (Spain) Roberto Carballés Baena

Doubles
- (Netherlands) Sander Arends / (Netherlands) Robin Haase
- Brawo Open

The 2024 Brawo Open was a professional tennis tournament played on clay courts. It was the 30th edition of the tournament which was part of the 2024 ATP Challenger Tour. It took place in Braunschweig, Germany between 8 and 13 July 2024.

== Singles main-draw entrants ==
=== Seeds ===
Country	Player	Rank^{1}	Seed
ESP	Roberto Carballés Baena	64	1
IND	Sumit Nagal	73	2
BRA	Thiago Seyboth Wild	74	3
GER	Daniel Altmaier	80	4
NED	Botic van de Zandschulp	97	5
COL	Daniel Elahi Galán	103	6
~~BIH~~	~~Damir Džumhur~~	~~105~~	~~7~~
CHI	Cristian Garín	106	8

- ^{1} Rankings are as of 1 July 2024.

=== Other entrants ===
The following players received wildcards into the singles main draw:

- (Germany) Daniel Altmaier
- (Germany) Nicola Kuhn
- (Germany) Rudolf Molleker

The following player received entry into the singles main draw as a special exempt:

- (Germany) Daniel Masur

The following players received entry into the singles main draw as alternates:

- (France) Matteo Martineau
- (Germany) Henri Squire

The following players received entry from the qualifying draw:

- (Germany) Sebastian Fanselow
- (Belgium) Michael Geerts
- (Germany) Tom Gentzsch
- (Germany) Marvin Möller
- (Germany) Max Hans Rehberg
- (Netherlands) Stijn Slump

The following player received entry as a lucky loser:

- (Spain) Carlos Sánchez Jover

== Champions ==
=== Singles ===
- (Spain) Roberto Carballés Baena def. (Netherlands) Botic van de Zandschulp 6–1, 6–3.

=== Doubles ===
- (Netherlands) Sander Arends / (Netherlands) Robin Haase def. (India) Sriram Balaji / (Ecuador) Gonzalo Escobar 4–6, 6–4, [10–8].
