= 2014 Sparkassen Open =

- Date: 30 June – 5 July
- Edition: 21st
- Surface: Clay
- Location: Braunschweig, Germany

Champions

Singles
- (Germany) Alexander Zverev

Doubles
- (Sweden) Andreas Siljeström / (Slovakia) Igor Zelenay
← 2013 ·	Sparkassen Open	· 2015 →

The 2014 Sparkassen Open was a professional tennis tournament played on clay courts. It was the 21st edition of the tournament which was part of the 2014 ATP Challenger Tour. It took place in Braunschweig, Germany between 30 June and 5 July 2014.

== Singles main-draw entrants ==
=== Seeds ===
Country	Player	Rank^{1}	Seed
KAZ	Andrey Golubev	56	1
ESP	Pablo Carreño Busta	60	2
GER	Tobias Kamke	87	3
FRA	Paul-Henri Mathieu	89	4
ARG	Diego Sebastian Schwartzman	93	5
BRA	Thomaz Bellucci	97	6
GER	Peter Gojowczyk	108	7
GER	Julian Reister	110	8

- ^{1} Rankings are as of June 24, 2014.

=== Other entrants ===
The following players received wildcards into the singles main draw:

- (Kazakhstan) Andrey Golubev
- (Germany) Maximilian Marterer
- (Germany) Philipp Petzschner
- (Germany) Alexander Zverev

The following players received entry as a special exempt into the singles main draw:

- (Serbia) Nikola Ćaćić

The following players received entry as an alternate into the singles main draw:

- (Belarus) Uladzimir Ignatik
- (Czech Republic) Jaroslav Pospíšil
- (Argentina) Martín Alund

The following players received entry from the qualifying draw:

- (Slovakia) Jozef Kovalík
- (Germany) Nils Langer
- (Russia) Philipp Davydenko
- (Brazil) André Ghem

The following player received entry as a lucky loser:

- (Serbia) Boris Pašanski

== Doubles main-draw entrants ==
=== Seeds ===
Country	Player	Country	Player	Rank^{1}	Seed
COL	Robert Farah	AUT	Philipp Oswald	82	1
GER	Gero Kretschmer	GER	Alexander Satschko	169	2
AUS	Rameez Junaid	SVK	Michal Mertiňák	185	3
POL	Mateusz Kowalczyk	NZL	Artem Sitak	218	4

- ^{1} Rankings as of June 24, 2014.

=== Other entrants ===
The following pairs received wildcards into the doubles main draw:

- (Czech Republic) Michal Konečný / (Czech Republic) Marek Pešička
- (India) Sriram Balaji / (Germany) Philipp Petzschner
- (Germany) Daniel Masur / (Germany) Alexander Zverev

== Champions ==
=== Singles ===
- (Germany) Alexander Zverev def. (France) Paul-Henri Mathieu, 1–6, 6–1, 6–4

=== Doubles ===
- (Sweden) Andreas Siljeström / (Slovakia) Igor Zelenay def. (Australia) Rameez Junaid / (Slovakia) Michal Mertiňák, 7–5, 6–4
