= 2019 Sparkassen Open – Doubles =

Doubles
- 2019 Sparkassen Open

Final
- Champions: (Italy) Simone Bolelli (Argentina) Guillermo Durán
- Runners-up: (United States) Nathaniel Lammons (Croatia) Antonio Šančić
- Score: 6–3, 6–2

Events
Singles	Doubles
- Sparkassen Open

Santiago González and Wesley Koolhof were the defending champions but chose not to defend their title.

Simone Bolelli and Guillermo Durán won the title after defeating Nathaniel Lammons and Antonio Šančić 6–3, 6–2 in the final.

== Seeds ==
1. (Italy) Simone Bolelli / (Argentina) Guillermo Durán (champions)
2. (India) Sriram Balaji / (United States) James Cerretani (first round)
3. (Belgium) Sander Gillé / (Netherlands) Sem Verbeek (first round)
4. (United States) Nathaniel Lammons / (Croatia) Antonio Šančić (final)

== Draw ==
Key

- Q = Qualifier
- WC = Wild card
- LL = Lucky loser
- Alt = Alternate
- ITF = ITF entry
- PR = Protected ranking
- SR = Special ranking
- SE = Special exempt
- JE = Junior exempt
- JR = Junior Accelerator Programme entrant
- CO = College Accelerator Programme entrant
- NG = Next Gen Accelerator Program entrant
- w/o = Walkover
- r = Retired
- d = Defaulted

First round
1	(Italy) S Bolelli (Argentina) G Durán	6	6
(Uruguay) A Behar (Ecuador) G Escobar	4	3
(Peru) S Galdós (United States) N Monroe	2	3
(Canada) S Diez (Portugal) J Domingues	6	6
3	(Belgium) S Gillé (Netherlands) S Verbeek	7	0	[8]
(Brazil) F Neis (Brazil) F Romboli	5	6	[10]
(Sweden) A Siljeström (Sweden) E Ymer	6	4	[10]
ITF	(Egypt) K-M Maamoun (Peru) A Merino	3	6	[7]
WC	(Germany) R Molleker (Serbia) N Zimonjić	6	6
Alt	(Austria) L Miedler (Germany) M Moraing	3	3
WC	(Germany) A Begemann (Germany) J Lenz	3	6^{3}
4	(United States) N Lammons (Croatia) A Šančić	6	7^{7}
(France) G Blancaneaux (Belgium) K Coppejans	6	4	[10]
ITF	(Spain) J Barranco Cosano (Germany) Peter Heller	2	6	[7]
WC	(Spain) N Kuhn (Germany) D Masur	7^{7}	6
2	(India) S Balaji (United States) J Cerretani	6^{1}	4

Quarterfinals
1	(Italy) S Bolelli (Argentina) G Durán	6	6
(Canada) S Diez (Portugal) J Domingues	0	4
(Brazil) F Neis (Brazil) F Romboli	6	3	[10]
(Sweden) A Siljeström (Sweden) E Ymer	4	6	[3]
WC	(Germany) R Molleker (Serbia) N Zimonjić	5	5
4	(United States) N Lammons (Croatia) A Šančić	7	7
(France) G Blancaneaux (Belgium) K Coppejans	6	4	[6]
WC	(Spain) N Kuhn (Germany) D Masur	4	6	[10]

Semifinals
1	(Italy) S Bolelli (Argentina) G Durán	6	7^{7}
(Brazil) F Neis (Brazil) F Romboli	4	6^{5}
4	(United States) N Lammons (Croatia) A Šančić	6	6
WC	(Spain) N Kuhn (Germany) D Masur	3	4

Final
1	(Italy) S Bolelli (Argentina) G Durán	6	6
4	(United States) N Lammons (Croatia) A Šančić	3	2
