= 2019 Sparkassen Open =

- Date: 8–13 July
- Edition: 26th
- Surface: Clay
- Location: Braunschweig, Germany

Champions

Singles
- (Brazil) Thiago Monteiro

Doubles
- (Italy) Simone Bolelli / (Argentina) Guillermo Durán
- Sparkassen Open

The 2019 Sparkassen Open was a professional tennis tournament played on clay courts. It was the 26th edition of the tournament which was part of the 2019 ATP Challenger Tour. It took place in Braunschweig, Germany between 8 and 13 July 2019.

== Singles main-draw entrants ==
=== Seeds ===
Country	Player	Rank^{1}	Seed
NOR	Casper Ruud	62	1
BOL	Hugo Dellien	83	2
SUI	Henri Laaksonen	97	3
ITA	Stefano Travaglia	102	4
POL	Kamil Majchrzak	108	5
BRA	Thiago Monteiro	113	6
SWE	Elias Ymer	118	7
ESP	Pedro Martínez	126	8
CZE	Lukáš Rosol	129	9
AUT	Sebastian Ofner	140	10
ITA	Gianluca Mager	142	11
BEL	Kimmer Coppejans	144	12
GER	Rudolf Molleker	147	13
~~GER~~	~~Dustin Brown~~	~~148~~	~~14~~
GER	Oscar Otte	150	15
ARG	Marco Trungelliti	162	16

- ^{1} Rankings are as of 1 July 2019.

=== Other entrants ===
The following players received wildcards into the singles main draw:

- (Germany) Daniel Altmaier
- (Germany) Johannes Härteis
- (Germany) Julian Lenz
- (Germany) Daniel Masur
- (Germany) Cedrik-Marcel Stebe

The following players received entry into the singles main draw as alternates:

- (Ecuador) Gonzalo Escobar
- (Germany) Benjamin Hassan
- (Argentina) Renzo Olivo

The following players received entry into the singles main draw using their ITF World Tennis Ranking:

- (Spain) Javier Barranco Cosano
- (Germany) Peter Heller
- (Egypt) Karim-Mohamed Maamoun
- (Netherlands) Botic van de Zandschulp
- (Netherlands) Tim van Rijthoven

The following players received entry from the qualifying draw:

- (France) Geoffrey Blancaneaux
- (Germany) Niklas Guttau

The following player received entry as a lucky loser:

- (Finland) Emil Ruusuvuori

== Champions ==
=== Singles ===
- (Brazil) Thiago Monteiro def. (Germany) Tobias Kamke 7–6^{(8–6)}, 6–1.

=== Doubles ===
- (Italy) Simone Bolelli / (Argentina) Guillermo Durán def. (United States) Nathaniel Lammons / (Croatia) Antonio Šančić 6–3, 6–2.
