= 2021 Sparkassen Open =

- Date: 5–11 July
- Edition: 27th
- Surface: Clay
- Location: Braunschweig, Germany

Champions

Singles
- (Germany) Daniel Altmaier

Doubles
- (Poland) Szymon Walków / (Poland) Jan Zieliński
- Sparkassen Open

The 2021 Sparkassen Open was a professional tennis tournament played on clay courts. It was the 27th edition of the tournament which was part of the 2021 ATP Challenger Tour. It took place in Braunschweig, Germany between 5 and 11 July 2021.

== Singles main-draw entrants ==
=== Seeds ===
Country	Player	Rank^{1}	Seed
FRA	Benoît Paire	46	1
~~LTU~~	~~Ričardas Berankis~~	~~80~~	~~2~~
GER	Yannick Hanfmann	99	3
SVK	Jozef Kovalík	127	4
SUI	Henri Laaksonen	137	5
CZE	Tomáš Macháč	144	6
IND	Sumit Nagal	150	7
GER	Daniel Altmaier	166	8

- ^{1} Rankings are as of 28 June 2021.

=== Other entrants ===
The following players received wildcards into the singles main draw:

- (Germany) Rudolf Molleker
- (Germany) Marvin Möller
- (France) Benoît Paire

The following players received entry into the singles main draw as alternates:

- (Tunisia) Malek Jaziri
- (Germany) Mischa Zverev

The following players received entry from the qualifying draw:

- (Switzerland) Sandro Ehrat
- (Australia) Dayne Kelly
- (Poland) Daniel Michalski
- (Germany) Mats Rosenkranz

The following player received entry as a lucky loser:

- (Germany) Benjamin Hassan

== Champions ==
=== Singles ===
- (Germany) Daniel Altmaier def. (Switzerland) Henri Laaksonen 6–1, 6–2.

=== Doubles ===
- (Poland) Szymon Walków / (Poland) Jan Zieliński def. (Croatia) Ivan Sabanov / (Croatia) Matej Sabanov 6–4, 4–6, [10–4].
