= 2017 Sparkassen Open – Singles =

Singles
- 2017 Sparkassen Open

Final
- Champion: (Spain) Nicola Kuhn
- Runner-up: (Croatia) Viktor Galović
- Score: 2–6, 7–5, 4–2 ret.

Events
Singles	Doubles
- Sparkassen Open

Thomaz Bellucci was the defending champion but lost in the first round to Gastão Elias.

Nicola Kuhn won the title after Viktor Galović retired trailing 6–2, 5–7, 2–4 in the final.

== Seeds ==
1. (Argentina) Horacio Zeballos (first round, retired)
2. (Brazil) Thomaz Bellucci (first round)
3. (Brazil) Rogério Dutra Silva (first round)
4. (Argentina) Carlos Berlocq (second round)
5. (Japan) Taro Daniel (first round)
6. (Slovakia) Norbert Gombos (second round)
7. (Germany) Dustin Brown (first round)
8. (Argentina) Guido Pella (first round)

== Draw ==
Key

- Q = Qualifier
- WC = Wild card
- LL = Lucky loser
- Alt = Alternate
- ITF = ITF entry
- PR = Protected ranking
- SR = Special ranking
- SE = Special exempt
- JE = Junior exempt
- JR = Junior Accelerator Programme entrant
- CO = College Accelerator Programme entrant
- NG = Next Gen Accelerator Program entrant
- w/o = Walkover
- r = Retired
- d = Defaulted

=== Finals ===
Semifinals
(Hungary) Márton Fucsovics	5	6	4
Q	(Spain) Nicola Kuhn	7	4	6
SE	(Croatia) Viktor Galović	4	7^{7}	6
(Germany) Oscar Otte	6	6^{2}	1

Final
Q	(Spain) Nicola Kuhn	2	7	4
SE	(Croatia) Viktor Galović	6	5	2^{r}

=== Top half ===
First round
1/WC	(Argentina) H Zeballos	3	2^{r}
(Germany) Y Hanfmann	6	4
(Moldova) R Albot	4	6	7
WC	(Germany) D Altmaier	6	4	5
SE	(Germany) C-M Stebe	4	7	6
(Hungary) A Balázs	6	5	2
(Hungary) M Fucsovics	7^{10}	3	6
8	(Argentina) G Pella	6^{8}	6	2
4	(Argentina) C Berlocq	6	3	6
(Czech Republic) J Šátral	3	6	4
Q	(Spain) N Kuhn	6	6
Q	(Portugal) G Oliveira	4	2
(Slovakia) J Kovalík	6	7^{7}
(Brazil) T Monteiro	3	6^{5}
(Italy) M Cecchinato	6	1	6
7	(Germany) D Brown	3	6	3

Second round
(Germany) Y Hanfmann	6	0	5
(Moldova) R Albot	4	6	7
SE	(Germany) C-M Stebe	4	1
(Hungary) M Fucsovics	6	6
4	(Argentina) C Berlocq	4	5
Q	(Spain) N Kuhn	6	7
(Slovakia) J Kovalík	6	6
(Italy) M Cecchinato	2	4

Quarterfinals
(Moldova) R Albot	2	2
(Hungary) M Fucsovics	6	6
Q	(Spain) N Kuhn	7^{7}	5	7^{8}
(Slovakia) J Kovalík	6^{1}	7	6^{6}

Semifinals
(Hungary) M Fucsovics	5	6	4
Q	(Spain) N Kuhn	7	4	6

=== Bottom half ===
First round
6	(Slovakia) N Gombos	6	6
(France) P-H Mathieu	1	1
SE	(Croatia) V Galović	5	6	6
(Germany) F Mayer	7	3	3
WC	(Germany) Y Maden	6	7^{7}
Q	(Germany) George von Massow	1	6^{5}
Q	(France) A Michon	6	6^{7}	6
3	(Brazil) R Dutra Silva	4	7^{9}	3
5	(Japan) T Daniel	6	4	6^{0}
(Germany) M Marterer	2	6	7^{7}
WC	(Germany) L Wessels	1	4
(Germany) O Otte	6	6
(Belarus) U Ignatik	4	4
(Poland) J Janowicz	6	6
(Portugal) G Elias	7	6
2	(Brazil) T Bellucci	5	2

Second round
6	(Slovakia) N Gombos	4	6	2
SE	(Croatia) V Galović	6	3	6
WC	(Germany) Y Maden	6	7
Q	(France) A Michon	3	5
(Germany) M Marterer	2	6	3
(Germany) O Otte	6	2	6
(Poland) J Janowicz	6	7^{7}
(Portugal) G Elias	4	6^{4}

Quarterfinals
SE	(Croatia) V Galović	6	6
WC	(Germany) Y Maden	3	3
(Germany) O Otte	4	7	6
(Poland) J Janowicz	6	5	4

Semifinals
SE	(Croatia) V Galović	4	7^{7}	6
(Germany) O Otte	6	6^{2}	1
