= 2017 Sparkassen Open =

- Date: 10–15 July
- Edition: 24th
- Surface: Clay
- Location: Braunschweig, Germany

Champions

Singles
- (Spain) Nicola Kuhn

Doubles
- (Austria) Julian Knowle / (Slovakia) Igor Zelenay
- Sparkassen Open

The 2017 Sparkassen Open was a professional tennis tournament played on clay courts. It was the 24th edition of the tournament which was part of the 2017 ATP Challenger Tour. It took place in Braunschweig, Germany between 10 and 15 July 2017.

== Singles main-draw entrants ==
=== Seeds ===
Country	Player	Rank^{1}	Seed
ARG	Horacio Zeballos	52	1
BRA	Thomaz Bellucci	55	2
BRA	Rogério Dutra Silva	69	3
ARG	Carlos Berlocq	80	4
JPN	Taro Daniel	92	5
SVK	Norbert Gombos	93	6
GER	Dustin Brown	97	7
ARG	Guido Pella	99	8

- ^{1} Rankings are as of 3 July 2017.

=== Other entrants ===
The following players received wildcards into the singles main draw:

- (Germany) Daniel Altmaier
- (Germany) Yannick Maden
- (Germany) Louis Wessels
- (Argentina) Horacio Zeballos

The following players received entry into the singles main draw as special exempts:

- (Croatia) Viktor Galović
- (Germany) Cedrik-Marcel Stebe

The following players received entry from the qualifying draw:

- (Spain) Nicola Kuhn
- (France) Axel Michon
- (Portugal) Gonçalo Oliveira
- (Germany) George von Massow

== Champions ==
=== Singles ===
- (Spain) Nicola Kuhn def. (Croatia) Viktor Galović 2–6, 7–5, 4–2 ret.

=== Doubles ===
- (Austria) Julian Knowle / (Slovakia) Igor Zelenay def. (Germany) Kevin Krawietz / (Germany) Gero Kretschmer 6–3, 7–6^{(7–3)}.
