= Nicola Kuhn =

German tennis player (born 2000)

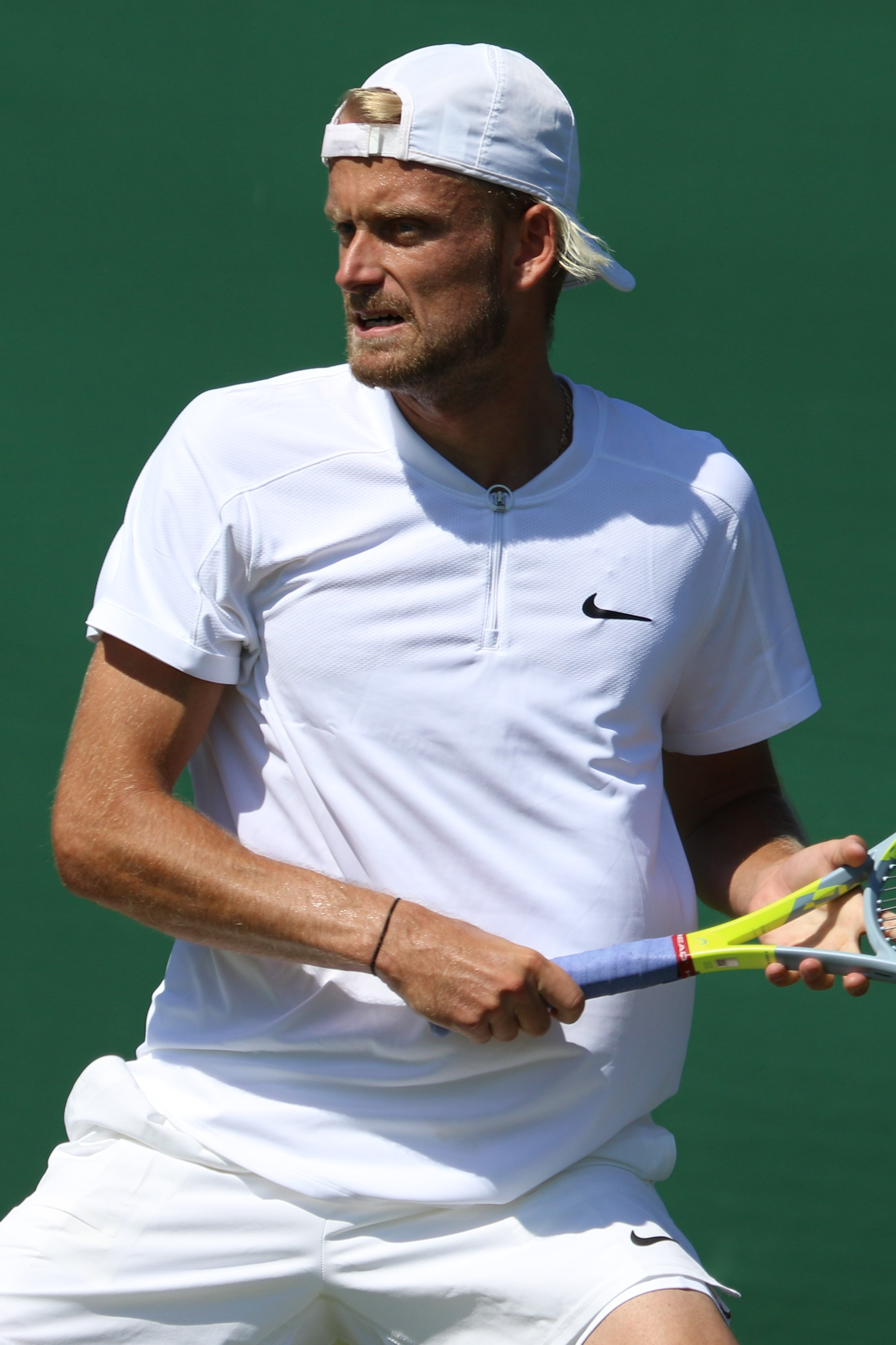
- Kuhn at the 2022 Wimbledon Championships
- Country (sports): Germany (2014–16, 2021–); Spain (2016–2021)
- Residence: Torrevieja, Spain
- Born: 20 March 2000 (age 26) Innsbruck, Austria
- Height: 1.85 m (6 ft 1 in)
- Turned pro: 2015
- Plays: Right-handed (two-handed backhand)
- Coach: Dirk Hordorff
- Prize money: $466,636

Singles
- Career record: 3–9 (in ATP Tour events)
- Career titles: 0
- Highest ranking: No. 174 (7 October 2019)

Grand Slam singles results
- Australian Open: Q2 (2019)
- French Open: Q1 (2020)
- Wimbledon: 1R (2022)
- US Open: Q2 (2019)

Doubles
- Career record: 0–0
- Career titles: 0
- Highest ranking: No. 287 (28 January 2019)
- Last updated on: 15 January 2026.

Nicola Kuhn (Spanish: [kun]; German: [kuːn]; born 20 March 2000) is an Austrian-born German inactive tennis player. He has a career high ATP singles ranking of World No. 174, achieved on 7 October 2019 and a doubles ranking of No. 287 achieved on 28 January 2019.

== Personal life ==
Kuhn has a German father and a Russian mother.

From April 2016 to October 2021, he represented Spain.

== Professional career ==
=== 2017: Junior Grand Slam champion, ATP debut ===
Kuhn won the 2017 French Open – Boys' doubles title with Zsombor Piros and reached the singles final of the same tournament.

Kuhn won his first ATP Challenger Tour title as a qualifier at the Sparkassen Open in Braunschweig.

He made his ATP main draw debut at the Shenzhen Open as a wildcard.

=== 2018: Maiden ATP win ===
Kuhn got to the finals of the Budapest Indoor Challenger Open in February 2018, but lost to ATP Tour veteran Vasek Pospisil in three sets. But he teamed up with Félix Auger-Aliassime to win the same tournament's doubles title. Next month Kuhn was awarded a wildcard for the 2018 Miami Open. He defeated Darian King to win his maiden ATP main draw match. He became the youngest Spaniard since Rafael Nadal to win a match on the ATP World Tour. In the second round he lost in straight sets to 15th seed Fabio Fognini.

=== 2021-2022: Grand Slam debut ===
He received a wildcard for the main draw of the 2021 Hamburg European Open.

He qualified for the 2022 Wimbledon Championships making his Grand Slam debut.

He also received a wildcard for the main draw of the 2022 Hamburg European Open.

== Singles performance timeline ==
Key
W	F	SF	QF	#R	RR	Q#	DNQ	A	NH

(W) winner; (F) finalist; (SF) semifinalist; (QF) quarterfinalist; (#R) rounds 4, 3, 2, 1; (RR) round-robin stage; (Q#) qualification round; (DNQ) did not qualify; (A) absent; (NH) not held; (SR) strike rate (events won / competed); (W–L) win–loss record.
To avoid confusion and double counting, these charts are updated at the conclusion of a tournament or when the player's participation has ended.

Current through the 2023 ATP Tour.

Tournament	2017	2018	2019	2020	2021	2022	2023	SR	W–L
Grand Slam tournaments
Australian Open	A	A	Q2	Q1	A	Q1	A	0 / 0	0–0
French Open	A	A	A	Q1	A	A	A	0 / 0	0–0
Wimbledon	A	A	A	NH	A	1R	A	0 / 1	0–1
US Open	A	A	Q2	A	A	A	A	0 / 0	0–0
Win–loss	0–0	0–0	0–0	0–0	0–0	0–1	0–0	0 / 1	0–1
ATP Tour Masters 1000
Miami Open	Q1	2R	1R	NH	A	A	A	0 / 2	1–2
Madrid Open	Q2	A	Q1	NH	A	A	A	0 / 0	0–0
Win–loss	0–0	1–1	0–1	0–0	0–0	0–0	0–0	0 / 2	1–2
Career statistics
Tournaments	1	1	2	0	3	2	0	9	
Overall win–loss	0–1	1–1	1–2	0–0	1–3	0–2	0–0	3–9	
Year-end ranking	242	245	214	252	242	503	709		

== ATP Challenger Tour finals ==
=== Singles: 4 (2 titles, 2 runner-ups) ===
Legend ATP Challenger Tour (2–2)

Result	W–L	Date	Tournament	Surface	Opponent	Score
Win	1–0	Jul 2017	Braunschweig, Germany	Clay	(Croatia) Viktor Galović	2–6, 7–5, 4–2 ret.
Loss	1–1	Feb 2018	Budapest, Hungary	Hard (i)	(Canada) Vasek Pospisil	6–7^{(3–7)}, 6–3, 3–6
Loss	1–2	Nov 2018	Canberra, Australia	Hard	(Australia) Jordan Thompson	1–6, 7–5, 4–6
Win	2–2	Aug 2019	Segovia, Spain	Hard	(Russia) Pavel Kotov	6–2, 7–6^{(7–4)}

=== Doubles: 1 (1 title) ===
Legend ATP Challenger Tour (1–0)

Result	W–L	Date	Tournament	Surface	Partner	Opponents	Score
Win	1–0	Feb 2018	Budapest, Hungary	Hard	(Canada) Félix Auger-Aliassime	(Croatia) Marin Draganja (Croatia) Tomislav Draganja	2–6, 6–2, [11–9]

== ITF Futures/World Tennis Tour finals ==
=== Singles: 7 (6 titles, 1 runner-up) ===
Legend ITF Futures/WTT (6–1)

Result	W–L	Date	Tournament	Surface	Opponent	Score
Win	1–0	May 2017	Zamardi, Hungary	Clay	(Hungary) Attila Balázs	6–4, 6–0
Win	2–0	Jul 2023	M15 Metzingen, Germany	Clay	(Czech Republic) Daniel Pátý	6–4, 6–1
Win	3–0	Aug 2023	M15 Allershausen, Germany	Clay	(Germany) Adrian Oetzbach	4–6, 7–5, 6–1
Win	4–0	Apr 2024	M25 Reus, Spain	Clay	(United Kingdom) Anton Matusevich	5–7, 7–6^{(7–2)}, 6–3
Loss	4–1	May 2024	M25 Valldoreix, Spain	Clay	(Slovakia) Martin Kližan	6–3, 0–6, 3–6
Win	5–1	Jun 2024	M25 La Nucia, Spain	Clay	(Lithuania) Edas Butvilas	7–6^{(7–3)}, 6–1
Win	6–1	Jun 2024	M25 Córdoba, Spain	Clay	(Spain) Pedro Vives Marcos	7–6^{(7–3)}, 6–3

=== Doubles: 2 (2 runner-ups) ===
Legend ITF WTT (0–2)

Result	W–L	Date	Tournament	Surface	Partner	Opponents	Score
Loss	0–1	Jan 2024	M15 Monastir, Tunisia	Hard	(Spain) David Pérez Sanz	(Germany) Christoph Negritu (Tunisia) Aziz Ouakaa	4–6, 7–6^{(7–5)}, [4–10]
Loss	0–2	Jan 2024	M15 Monastir, Tunisia	Hard	(Spain) David Pérez Sanz	(France) Constantin Bittoun Kouzmine (Croatia) Mili Poljičak	1–6, 6–0, [8–10]

== Junior Grand Slam finals ==
=== Singles: 1 (1 runner-up) ===
Result	Year	Tournament	Surface	Opponent	Score
Loss	2017	French Open	Clay	(Australia) Alexei Popyrin	6–7^{(5–7)}, 3–6

=== Doubles: 1 (1 title) ===
Result	Year	Tournament	Surface	Partner	Opponents	Score
Win	2017	French Open	Clay	(Hungary) Zsombor Piros	(United States) Vasil Kirkov (United States) Danny Thomas	6–4, 6–4
