= Brawo Open =

- 2026 Brawo Open

ATP Challenger Tour
- Event name: Brawo Open (2022-), Nord LB Open (-2010), Sparkassen Open (2011-2021)
- Location: Braunschweig, Germany
- Venue: Braunschweiger Tennis und Hockey Club
- Category: Challenger 125 (2022-)
- Surface: Clay (red)
- Draw: 48S / 4Q / 16D
- Prize money: €181,250 (2025), 148,625
- Website: brawo-open.de

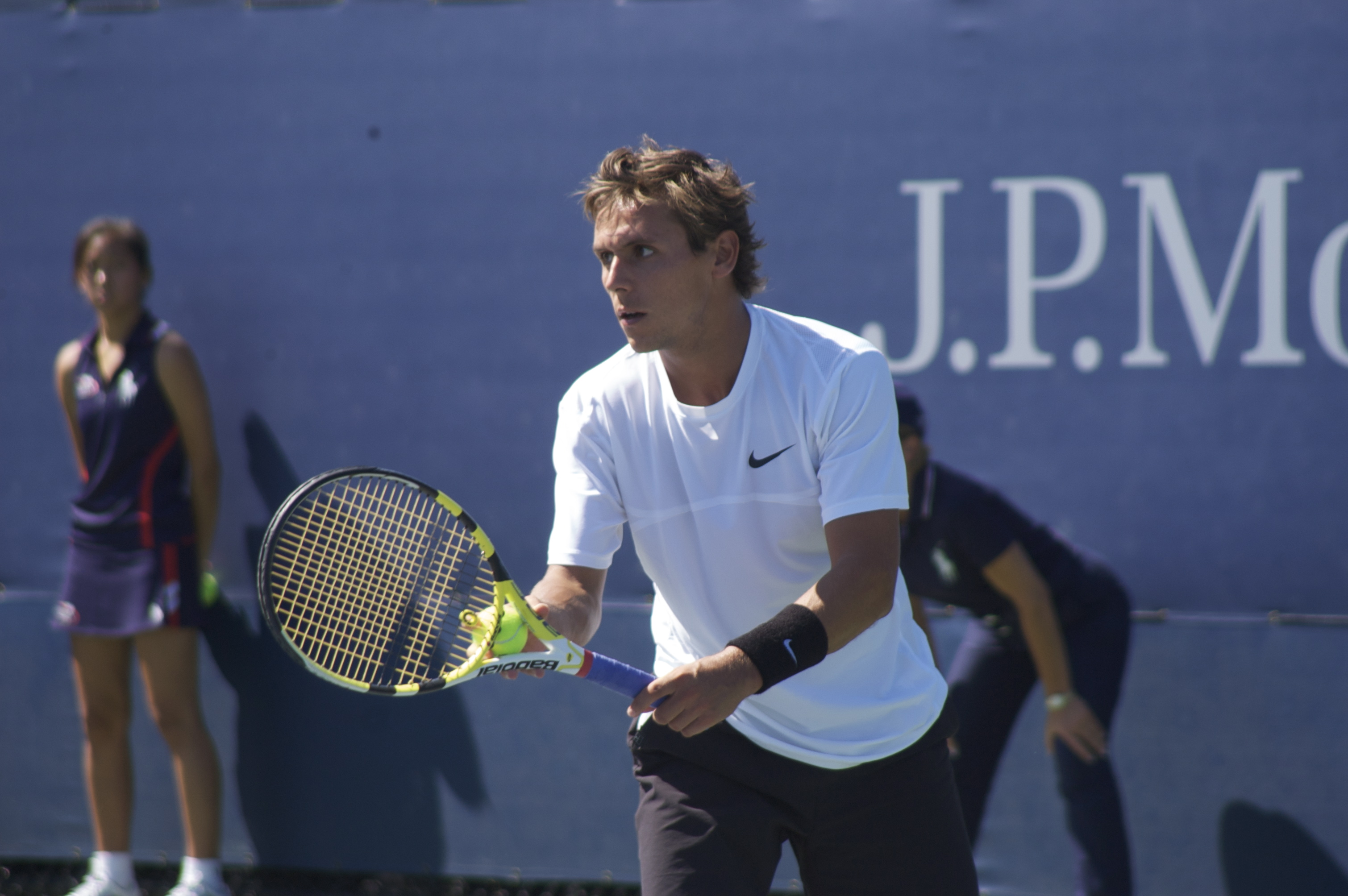
The 2008 singles champion, Nicolas Devilder from France, defeated Argentine Sergio Roitman in the final

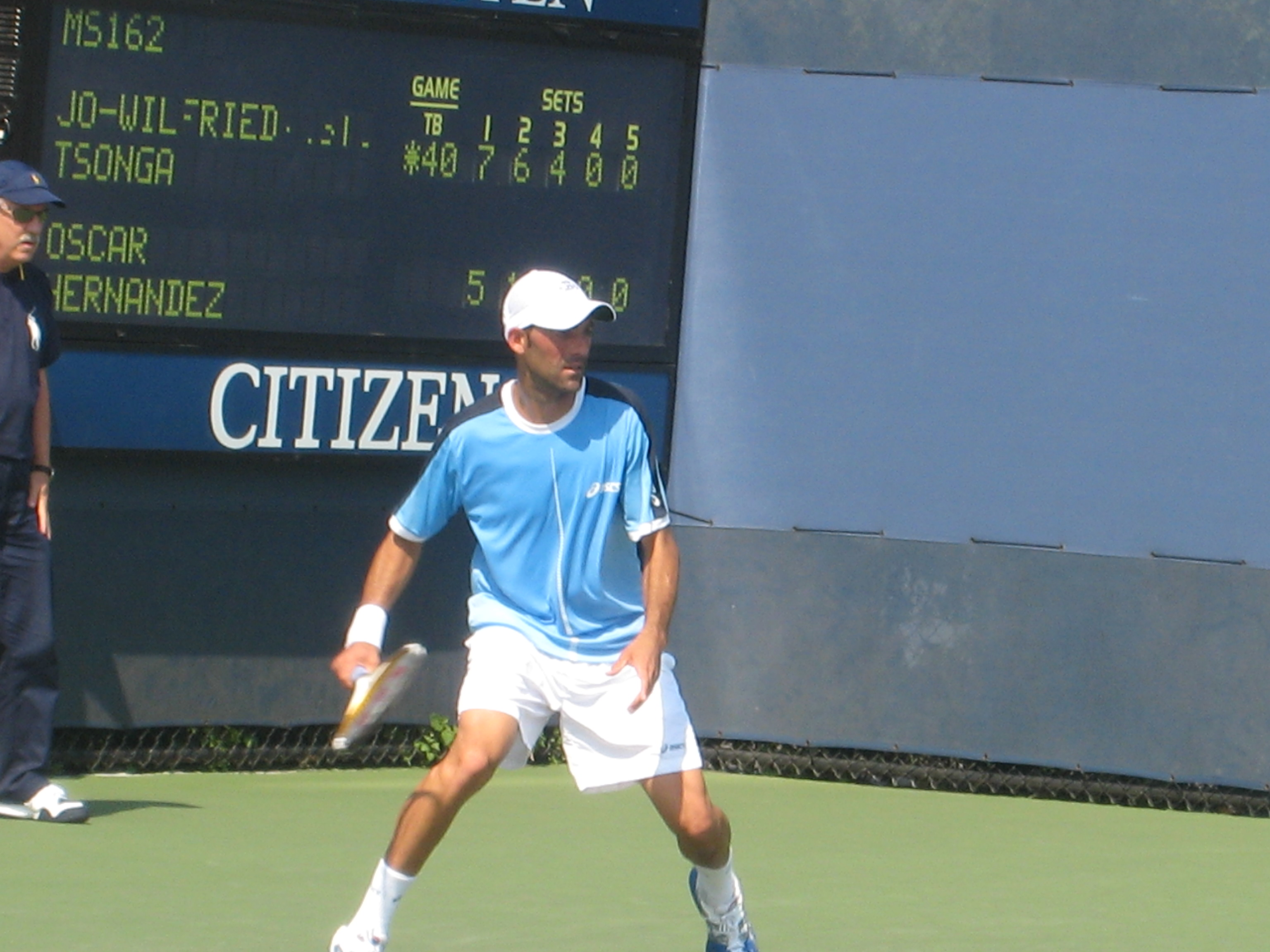
Spanish player Óscar Hernández reached three singles finals, winning in 2005, 2007, and 2009, and two doubles finals, losing in 2007 before winning in 2008

The Brawo Open (formerly Nord/LB Open, Sparkassen Open) is a professional tennis tournament played on outdoor red clay courts. It is currently part of the ATP Challenger Tour. It is held annually at the Braunschweiger Tennis und Hockey Club in Braunschweig, Germany, since 1994 and it is the longest-running German Challenger and the ninth longest-running event on the Challenger Tour.

In 2005, 2014, 2015, and 2016 the tournament received the ATP Challenger of the Year award from the ATP.

== Past finals ==
=== Singles ===
Year	Champions	Runners-up	Score
2026	(United Kingdom) Jan Choinski	(France) Hugo Gaston	4–6, 6–0, 6–4
2025	(Argentina) Mariano Navone	(Argentina) Juan Manuel Cerúndolo	6–3, 7–5
2024	(Spain) Roberto Carballés Baena	(Netherlands) Botic van de Zandschulp	6–1, 6–3
2023	(Italy) Franco Agamenone	Pavel Kotov	7–5, 6–3
2022	(Germany) Jan-Lennard Struff	(Germany) Maximilian Marterer	6–2, 6–2
2021	(Germany) Daniel Altmaier	(Switzerland) Henri Laaksonen	6–1, 6–2
2020	Not held		
2019	(Brazil) Thiago Monteiro	(Germany) Tobias Kamke	7–6^{(8–6)}, 6–1
2018	(Germany) Yannick Hanfmann	(Slovakia) Jozef Kovalík	6–2, 3–6, 6–3
2017	(Spain) Nicola Kuhn	(Croatia) Viktor Galović	2–6, 7–5, 4–2 ret.
2016	(Brazil) Thomaz Bellucci	(Spain) Íñigo Cervantes	6–1, 1–6, 6–3
2015	(Serbia) Filip Krajinović	(France) Paul-Henri Mathieu	6–2, 6–4
2014	(Germany) Alexander Zverev	(France) Paul-Henri Mathieu	1–6, 6–1, 6–4
2013	(Germany) Florian Mayer	(Czech Republic) Jiří Veselý	4–6, 6–2, 6–1
2012	(Brazil) Thomaz Bellucci	(Germany) Tobias Kamke	7–6^{(7–4)}, 6–3
2011	(Czech Republic) Lukáš Rosol	(Russia) Evgeny Donskoy	7–5, 7–6^{(7–2)}
2010	(Kazakhstan) Mikhail Kukushkin	(Brazil) Marcos Daniel	6–2, 3–0, RET.
2009	(Spain) Óscar Hernández	(Russia) Teymuraz Gabashvili	6–1, 3–6, 6–4
2008	(France) Nicolas Devilder	(Argentina) Sergio Roitman	6–4, 6–4
2007	(Spain) Óscar Hernández	(Germany) Florian Mayer	6–2, 1–6, 6–1
2006	(Czech Republic) Jan Hájek	(Spain) Fernando Vicente	6–1, 6–3
2005	(Spain) Óscar Hernández	(Ecuador) Nicolás Lapentti	6–3, 6–3
2004	(Czech Republic) Tomáš Berdych	(Germany) Daniel Elsner	4–6, 6–1, 6–4
2003	(Austria) Werner Eschauer	(Russia) Igor Andreev	6–1, 7–6(2)
2002	(Spain) David Sánchez	(Argentina) José Acasuso	5–1 retired
2001	(Italy) Andrea Gaudenzi	(Morocco) Younes El Aynaoui	3–6, 7–6(5), 6–4
2000	(Argentina) Gastón Gaudio	(Argentina) Franco Squillari	6–4, 6–7(2), 6–4
1999	(Germany) Jens Knippschild	(Argentina) Franco Squillari	7–5, 7–6(6)
1998	(Argentina) Franco Squillari	(Argentina) Lucas Arnold Ker	6–2, 4–6, 6–1
1997	(Spain) Francisco Roig	(Spain) Félix Mantilla Botella	6–2, 2–6, 6–2
1996	(Spain) Alberto Berasategui	(Hungary) Jozsef Krocsko	6–2, 6–2
1995	(Sweden) Magnus Gustafsson	(Italy) Stefano Pescosolido	4–6, 6–0, 7–6()
1994	(Austria) Gilbert Schaller	(Spain) Javier Sánchez	6–4, 3–6, 6–3

=== Doubles ===
Year	Champions	Runners-up	Score
2026	(Brazil) Orlando Luz (Brazil) Rafael Matos	(France) Arthur Reymond (France) Luca Sanchez	7–5, 6–2
2025	(United States) Vasil Kirkov (Netherlands) Bart Stevens	(Peru) Alexander Merino (Germany) Christoph Negritu	6–2, 6–3
2024	(Netherlands) Sander Arends (Netherlands) Robin Haase	(India) Sriram Balaji (Ecuador) Gonzalo Escobar	4–6, 6–4, [10–8]
2023	(France) Pierre-Hugues Herbert (France) Arthur Reymond	(India) Rithvik Choudary Bollipalli (India) Arjun Kadhe	7–6^{(9–7)}, 6–4
2022	(Brazil) Marcelo Demoliner (Germany) Jan-Lennard Struff	(Czech Republic) Roman Jebavý (Czech Republic) Adam Pavlásek	6–4, 7–5
2021	(Poland) Szymon Walków (Poland) Jan Zieliński	(Croatia) Ivan Sabanov (Croatia) Matej Sabanov	6–4, 4–6, [10–4]
2020	Not held		
2019	(Italy) Simone Bolelli (Argentina) Guillermo Durán	(United States) Nathaniel Lammons (Croatia) Antonio Šančić	6–3, 6–2
2018	(Mexico) Santiago González (Netherlands) Wesley Koolhof	(India) Sriram Balaji (India) Vishnu Vardhan	6–3, 6–3
2017	(Austria) Julian Knowle (Slovakia) Igor Zelenay	(Germany) Kevin Krawietz (Germany) Gero Kretschmer	6–3, 7–6^{(7–3)}
2016	(United States) James Cerretani (Austria) Philipp Oswald	(Poland) Mateusz Kowalczyk (Croatia) Antonio Šančić	4–6, 7–6^{(7–5)}, [10–2]
2015	(Belarus) Sergey Betov (Russia) Michail Elgin	(Bosnia and Herzegovina) Damir Džumhur (Croatia) Franko Škugor	3–6, 6–1, [10–5]
2014	(Sweden) Andreas Siljeström (Slovakia) Igor Zelenay	(Australia) Rameez Junaid (Slovakia) Michal Mertiňák	7–5, 6–4
2013	(Poland) Tomasz Bednarek (Poland) Mateusz Kowalczyk	(Sweden) Andreas Siljeström (Slovakia) Igor Zelenay	6–2, 7–6^{(7–4)}
2012	(Poland) Tomasz Bednarek (Poland) Mateusz Kowalczyk	(Finland) Harri Heliövaara (Ukraine) Denys Molchanov	7–5, 6–7^{(1–7)}, [10–8]
2011	(Germany) Martin Emmrich (Sweden) Andreas Siljeström	(France) Olivier Charroin (France) Stéphane Robert	0–6, 6–4, [10–7]
2010	(Portugal) Leonardo Tavares (Italy) Simone Vagnozzi	(Russia) Igor Kunitsyn (Kazakhstan) Yuri Schukin	7–5, 7–6(4)
2009	(Sweden) Johan Brunström (Netherlands Antilles) Jean-Julien Rojer	(Argentina) Brian Dabul (Chile) Nicolás Massú	7–6(2), 6–4
2008	(Italy) Marco Crugnola (Spain) Óscar Hernández	(Austria) Werner Eschauer (Austria) Philipp Oswald	7–6(4), 6–2
2007	(Germany) Tomas Behrend (Germany) Christopher Kas	(Spain) Óscar Hernández (Spain) Carles Poch-Gradin	6–0, 6–2
2006	(Germany) Tomas Behrend (Germany) Christopher Kas	(Argentina) Máximo González (Argentina) Sergio Roitman	7–6(5), 6–4
2005	(Italy) Enzo Artoni (Spain) Álex López Morón	(Italy) Massimo Bertolini (Belgium) Tom Vanhoudt	5–7, 6–4, 7–6(12)
2004	(Germany) Tomas Behrend (Spain) Emilio Benfele Álvarez	(Czech Republic) Jaroslav Levinský (Czech Republic) David Škoch	6–2, 6–7(3), 7–6(10)
2003	(Argentina) Sebastián Prieto (United States) Jim Thomas	(Spain) Juan-Ignacio Carrasco (Spain) Albert Montañés	4–6, 6–1, 6–4
2002	(Argentina) Mariano Hood (Peru) Luis Horna	(Czech Republic) František Čermák (Czech Republic) Petr Luxa	3–6, 6–3, 6–1
2001	(Germany) Karsten Braasch (Germany) Jens Knippschild	(Spain) Feliciano López (Spain) Francisco Roig	6–1, 6–1
2000	(Germany) Jens Knippschild (United States) Jeff Tarango	(Spain) Álex López Morón (Spain) Albert Portas	6–2, 6–2
1999	(Spain) Albert Portas (Spain) Germán Puentes-Alcañiz	(Spain) Tomás Carbonell (Federal Republic of Yugoslavia) Nebojsa Djordjevic	6–4, 6–7(3), 6–3
1998	(Spain) Tomás Carbonell (Spain) Francisco Roig	(Spain) Juan Balcells (Portugal) Emanuel Couto	6–2, 7–6
1997	(United States) Brandon Coupe (South Africa) Paul Rosner	(Federal Republic of Yugoslavia) Nebojsa Djordjevic (Mexico) Óscar Ortiz	6–4, 6–3
1996	(Germany) Karsten Braasch (Germany) Jens Knippschild	(Italy) Cristian Brandi (Italy) Filippo Messori	6–3, 6–4
1995	(Sweden) Nicklas Kulti (Sweden) Mikael Tillström	(United States) Bill Behrens (South Africa) Brendan Curry	7–6, 6–4
1994	(Argentina) Horacio de la Peña (Spain) Emilio Sánchez Vicario	(Hungary) Gábor Köves (Hungary) László Markovits	6–4, 7–6
