= Harri Heliövaara career statistics =

Career finals
Discipline	Type	Won	Lost	Total	WR
Doubles
Doubles	Grand Slam	3	1	4	0.75
Doubles	ATP Finals	1	0	1	1.00
Doubles	ATP 1000	2	1	3	0.67
Doubles	ATP 500	4	5	9	0.44
Doubles	ATP 250	7	6	13	0.54
Doubles	Olympics	–	–	0	–
Doubles	Total	17	13	30	0.57
Mixed; Doubles
Mixed; Doubles	Grand Slam	1	0	1	1.00
Mixed; Doubles	Total	1	0	1	1.00

Career statistics of Finnish professional tennis player Harri Heliövaara include:

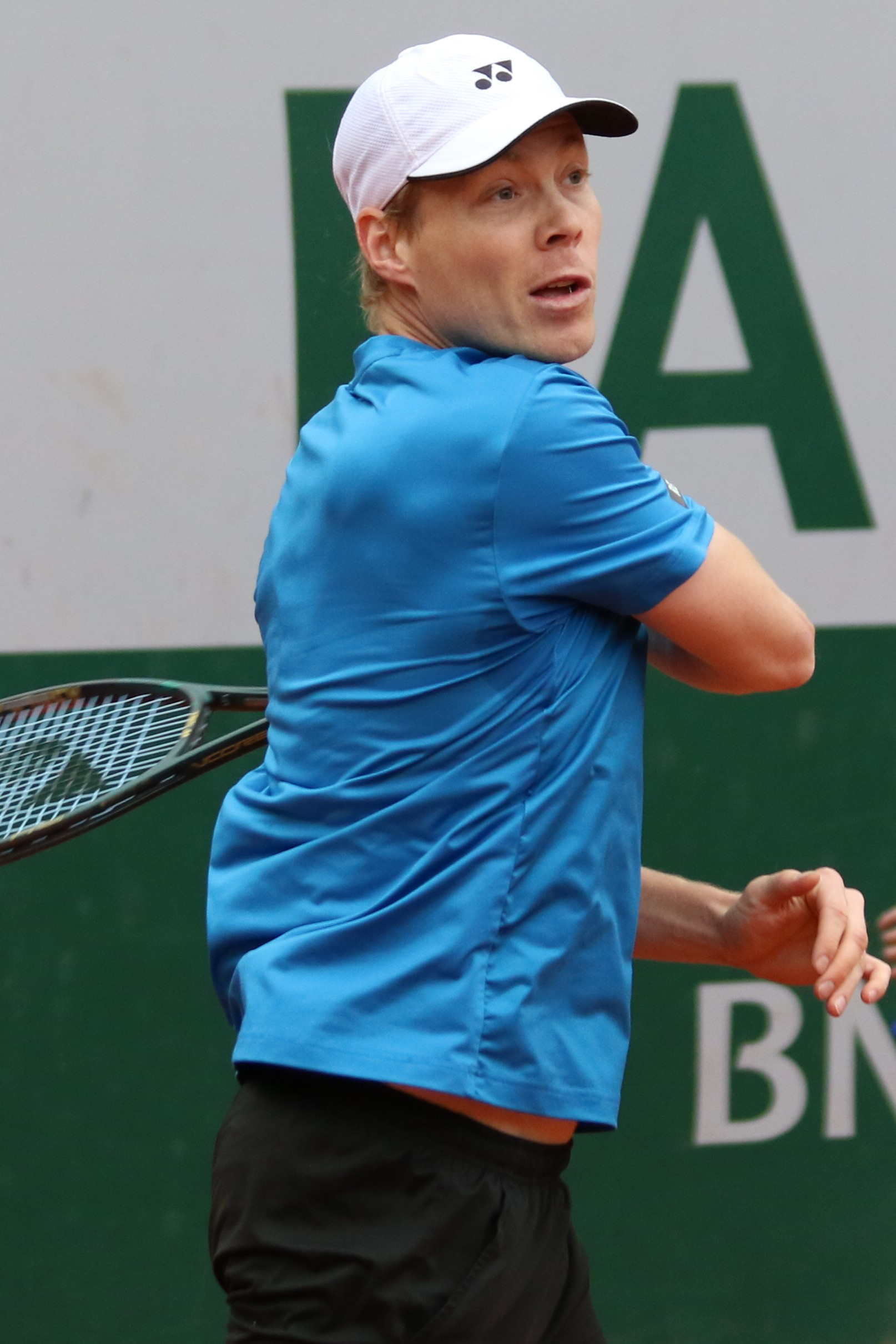
Heliovaara at the 2022 French Open

== Performance timeline ==
Key
W	F	SF	QF	#R	RR	Q#	P#	DNQ	A	Z#	PO	G	S	B	NMS	NTI	P	NH

(W) winner; (F) finalist; (SF) semifinalist; (QF) quarterfinalist; (#R) rounds 4, 3, 2, 1; (RR) round-robin stage; (Q#) qualification round; (P#) preliminary round; (DNQ) did not qualify; (A) absent; (Z#) Davis/Fed Cup Zonal Group (with number indication) or (PO) play-off; (G) gold, (S) silver or (B) bronze Olympic/Paralympic medal; (NMS) not a Masters tournament; (NTI) not a Tier I tournament; (P) postponed; (NH) not held; (SR) strike rate (events won / competed); (W–L) win–loss record.
To avoid confusion and double counting, these charts are updated at the conclusion of a tournament or when the player's participation has ended.

Current through the 2026 Wimbledon Championships.

=== Doubles ===
Tournament	2021	2022	2023	2024	2025	2026	SR	W–L
Grand Slam tournaments
Australian Open	A	2R	2R	2R	W	3R	1 / 5	11–4
French Open	A	QF	3R	3R	QF	F	0 / 5	15–4
Wimbledon	3R	3R	A	W	QF (Note: Heliovaara/Patten received a walkover into the quarterfinals, which does not count as a win.)	W	2 / 5	18–2
US Open	1R	QF	2R	3R	1R	SF	0 / 6	10–6
Win–loss	2–1	9–4	4–3	11–2	11–3	17–3	3 / 21	54–16
Year-end championship
ATP Finals	DNQ	SF	DNQ	SF	W		1 / 3	9–4
National representation
Davis Cup	WG1	QR	SF	RR	WG1		0 / 2	14–10
ATP Tour Masters 1000
Indian Wells Open	A	A	QF	A	2R	A	0 / 2	3–2
Miami Open	A	A	QF	1R	SF	F	0 / 4	8–4
Monte-Carlo Masters	A	A	QF	A	SF	QF	0 / 3	5–3
Madrid Open	A	A	2R	A	QF	W	1 / 3	8–2
Italian Open	A	QF	2R	1R	SF	QF	0 / 5	7–5
Canadian Open	A	QF	1R	1R	2R	QF	0 / 5	5–5
Cincinnati Open	A	2R	1R	QF	1R	2R	0 / 5	4–5
Shanghai Masters	Not Held		1R	1R	QF		0 / 3	2–3
Paris Masters	A	SF	SF	QF	W		1 / 4	10–3
Win–loss	0–0	7–4	11–9	3–6	16–8	15–5	2 / 34	52–32
Career statistics
Tournaments	13	27	23	24	23	12	Career total: 123	
Titles	2	1	1	4	4	5	Career total: 17	
Finals	2	7	2	6	5	8	Career total: 30	
Win–loss	15–10	49–27	36–23	46–22	50–21	39–7	241–116	
Year-end ranking	64	11	29	16	3		67.51%	

== Grand Slam tournament finals ==
=== Doubles: 4 (3 titles, 1 runner-up) ===
Outcome	Year	Tournament	Surface	Partner	Opponents	Score
Win	2024	Wimbledon	Grass	(United Kingdom) Henry Patten	(Australia) Max Purcell (Australia) Jordan Thompson	6–7^{(7–9)}, 7–6^{(10–8)}, 7–6^{(11–9)}
Win	2025	Australian Open	Hard	(United Kingdom) Henry Patten	(Italy) Simone Bolelli (Italy) Andrea Vavassori	6–7^{(16–18)}, 7–6^{(7–5)}, 6–3
Loss	2026	French Open	Clay	(United Kingdom) Henry Patten	(Spain) Marcel Granollers (Argentina) Horacio Zeballos	4–6, 2–6
Win	2026	Wimbledon (2)	Grass	(United Kingdom) Henry Patten	(El Salvador) Marcelo Arévalo (Croatia) Mate Pavić	7–6^{(7–4)}, 7–6^{(7–3)}

=== Mixed doubles: 1 (1 title) ===
Result	Year	Tournament	Surface	Partner	Opponents	Score
Win	2023	US Open	Hard	(Kazakhstan) Anna Danilina	(United States) Jessica Pegula (United States) Austin Krajicek	6–3, 6–4

== Other significant finals ==
=== Year-end championships ===
==== Doubles: 1 (1 title) ====
Outcome	Year	Tournament	Surface	Partner	Opponents	Score
Win	2025	ATP Finals, Turin	Hard (i)	(United Kingdom) Henry Patten	(United Kingdom) Joe Salisbury (United Kingdom) Neal Skupski	7–5, 6–3

=== ATP 1000 tournaments ===
==== Doubles: 4 (2 titles, 1 runner-up) ====
Outcome	Year	Tournament	Surface	Partner	Opponents	Score
Win	2025	Paris Masters	Hard (i)	(United Kingdom) Henry Patten	(United Kingdom) Julian Cash (United Kingdom) Lloyd Glasspool	6–3, 6–4
Loss	2026	Miami Open	Hard	(United Kingdom) Henry Patten	(Italy) Simone Bolelli (Italy) Andrea Vavassori	4–6, 2–6
Win	2026	Madrid Open	Clay	(United Kingdom) Henry Patten	(Argentina) Guido Andreozzi (France) Manuel Guinard	6–3, 3–6, [10–7]

== ATP Tour finals ==
=== Doubles: 30 (17 titles, 13 runner-ups) ===
Legend Grand Slam (3–1) ATP Finals (1–0) ATP 1000 (2–1) ATP 500 (4–5) ATP 250 (7–6)	Finals by surface Hard (11–8) Clay (4–3) Grass (2–2)	Finals by setting Outdoor (12–9) Indoor (5–4)

Result	W–L	Date	Tournament	Tier	Surface	Partner	Opponents	Score
Win	1–0	Mar 2021	Open 13, France	250 Series	Hard (i)	(United Kingdom) Lloyd Glasspool	(Netherlands) Sander Arends (Netherlands) David Pel	7–5, 7–6^{(7–4)}
Win	2–0	Oct 2021	Kremlin Cup, Russia	250 Series	Hard (i)	(Netherlands) Matwé Middelkoop	(Bosnia and Herzegovina) Tomislav Brkić (Serbia) Nikola Ćaćić	7–5, 4–6, [11–9]
Loss	2–1	Feb 2022	Open Sud de France, France	250 Series	Hard (i)	(United Kingdom) Lloyd Glasspool	(France) Pierre-Hugues Herbert (France) Nicolas Mahut	6–4, 6–7^{(3–7)}, [10–12]
Loss	2–2	Feb 2022	Dallas Open, US	250 Series	Hard (i)	(United Kingdom) Lloyd Glasspool	(El Salvador) Marcelo Arévalo (Netherlands) Jean-Julien Rojer	6–7^{(4–7)}, 4–6
Loss	2–3	Jun 2022	Queen's Club Championships, UK	500 Series	Grass	(United Kingdom) Lloyd Glasspool	(Croatia) Nikola Mektić (Croatia) Mate Pavić	6–3, 6–7^{(3–7)}, [6–10]
Win	3–3	Jul 2022	Hamburg European Open, Germany	500 Series	Clay	(United Kingdom) Lloyd Glasspool	(India) Rohan Bopanna (Netherlands) Matwé Middelkoop	6–2, 6–4
Loss	3–4	Jul 2022	Croatia Open, Croatia	250 Series	Clay	(United Kingdom) Lloyd Glasspool	(Italy) Simone Bolelli (Italy) Fabio Fognini	7–5, 6–7^{(6–8)}, [7–10]
Loss	3–5	Sep 2022	Moselle Open, France	250 Series	Hard (i)	(United Kingdom) Lloyd Glasspool	(Monaco) Hugo Nys (Poland) Jan Zieliński	6–7^{(5–7)}, 4–6
Loss	3–6	Oct 2022	Stockholm Open, Sweden	250 Series	Hard (i)	(United Kingdom) Lloyd Glasspool	(El Salvador) Marcelo Arévalo (Netherlands) Jean-Julien Rojer	3–6, 3–6
Win	4–6	Jan 2023	Adelaide International 1, Australia	250 Series	Hard	(United Kingdom) Lloyd Glasspool	(United Kingdom) Jamie Murray (New Zealand) Michael Venus	6–3, 7–6^{(7–3)}
Loss	4–7	Feb 2023	Dubai Championships, UAE	500 Series	Hard	(United Kingdom) Lloyd Glasspool	(United States) Maxime Cressy (France) Fabrice Martin	6–7^{(2–7)}, 4–6
Win	5–7	Apr 2024	Grand Prix Hassan II, Morocco	250 Series	Clay	(United Kingdom) Henry Patten	(Austria) Alexander Erler (Austria) Lucas Miedler	3–6, 6–4, [10–4]
Loss	5–8	Apr 2024	Țiriac Open, Romania	250 Series	Clay	(United Kingdom) Henry Patten	(France) Sadio Doumbia (France) Fabien Reboul	3–6, 5–7
Win	6–8	May 2024	ATP Lyon Open, France	250 Series	Clay	(United Kingdom) Henry Patten	(India) Yuki Bhambri (France) Albano Olivetti	3–6, 7–6^{(7–4)}, [10–8]
Win	7–8	Jul 2024	Wimbledon Championships, UK	Grand Slam	Grass	(United Kingdom) Henry Patten	(Australia) Max Purcell (Australia) Jordan Thompson	6–7^{(7–9)}, 7–6^{(10–8)}, 7–6^{(11–9)}
Loss	7–9	Oct 2024	China Open, China	500 Series	Hard	(United Kingdom) Henry Patten	(Italy) Simone Bolelli (Italy) Andrea Vavassori	6–4, 3–6, [5–10]
Win	8–9	Oct 2024	Stockholm Open, Sweden	250 Series	Hard (i)	(United Kingdom) Henry Patten	(Czech Republic) Petr Nouza (Czech Republic) Patrik Rikl	7–5, 6–3
Win	9–9	Jan 2025	Australian Open, Australia	Grand Slam	Hard	(United Kingdom) Henry Patten	(Italy) Simone Bolelli (Italy) Andrea Vavassori	6–7^{(16–18)}, 7–6^{(7–5)}, 6–3
Loss	9–10	Mar 2025	Dubai Championships, UAE	500 Series	Hard	(United Kingdom) Henry Patten	(India) Yuki Bhambri (Australia) Alexei Popyrin	6–3, 6–7^{(12–14)}, [8–10]
Win	10–10	Sep 2025	China Open, China	500 Series	Hard	(United Kingdom) Henry Patten	Andrey Rublev; Karen Khachanov	4–6, 6–3, [10–8]
Win	11–10	Nov 2025	Paris Masters, France	Masters 1000	Hard (i)	(United Kingdom) Henry Patten	(United Kingdom) Julian Cash (United Kingdom) Lloyd Glasspool	6–3, 6–4
Win	12–10	Nov 2025	ATP Finals, Italy	Tour Finals	Hard (i)	(United Kingdom) Henry Patten	(United Kingdom) Joe Salisbury (United Kingdom) Neal Skupski	7–5, 6–3
Win	13–10	Jan 2026	Adelaide International, Australia (2)	250 Series	Hard	(United Kingdom) Henry Patten	(Germany) Kevin Krawietz (Germany) Tim Pütz	6–3, 6–2
Win	14–10	Feb 2026	Qatar Open, Qatar	500 Series	Hard	(United Kingdom) Henry Patten	(United Kingdom) Julian Cash (United Kingdom) Lloyd Glasspool	6–3, 6–3
Win	15–10	Feb 2026	Dubai Championships, UAE	500 Series	Hard	(United Kingdom) Henry Patten	(El Salvador) Marcelo Arévalo (Croatia) Mate Pavić	7–5, 7–5
Loss	15–11	Mar 2026	Miami Open, United States	Masters 1000	Hard	(United Kingdom) Henry Patten	(Italy) Simone Bolelli (Italy) Andrea Vavassori	4–6, 2–6
Win	16–11	May 2026	Madrid Open, Spain	Masters 1000	Clay	(United Kingdom) Henry Patten	(Argentina) Guido Andreozzi (France) Manuel Guinard	6–3, 3–6, [10–7]
Loss	16–12	Jun 2026	French Open, France	Grand Slam	Clay	(United Kingdom) Henry Patten	(Spain) Marcel Granollers (Argentina) Horacio Zeballos	4–6, 2–6
Loss	16–13	Jun 2026	Queen's Club Championships, UK	500 Series	Grass	(United Kingdom) Henry Patten	(El Salvador) Marcelo Arévalo (Croatia) Mate Pavić	2–6, 4–6
Win	17–13	Jul 2026	Wimbledon Championships, UK (2)	Grand Slam	Grass	(United Kingdom) Henry Patten	(El Salvador) Marcelo Arévalo (Croatia) Mate Pavić	7–6^{(7–4)}, 7–6^{(7–3)}

== Challengers and futures finals ==
=== Singles: 13 (8 titles, 5 runner-ups) ===
Legend ATP Challenger (0–0) ITF Futures (8–5)	Finals by surface Hard (7–4) Clay (0–1) Grass (0–0) Carpet (1–0)

Result	W–L	Date	Tournament	Tier	Surface	Opponent	Score
Loss	0–1	Sep 2009	Netherlands F5, Almere	Futures	Clay	(United States) Gregory Ouellette	2–6, 6–3, 4–6
Loss	0–2	Oct 2009	Thailand F5, Nakhon Ratchasima	Futures	Hard	(Hungary) Ádám Kellner	6–2, 6–7^{(5–7)}, 4–6
Win	1–2	Apr 2010	Korea F1, Seogwipo	Futures	Hard	(Romania) Teodor-Dacian Crăciun	6–4, 6–2
Win	2–2	Jun 2010	China F5, Wuhan	Futures	Hard	(South Korea) Lim Yong-kyu	6–7^{(5–7)}, 6–4, 6–0
Loss	2–3	Sep 2010	China F7, Hangzhou	Futures	Hard	(China) Yan Bai	2–6, 6–4, 3–6
Win	3–3	Jan 2011	Great Britain F2, Sheffield	Futures	Hard	(France) Kenny de Schepper	6–4, 5–7, 6–4
Win	4–3	May 2011	Uzbekistan F1, Andijan	Futures	Hard	(New Zealand) Michael Venus	6–4, 6–4
Win	5–3	Oct 2011	Indonesia F4, Jakarta	Futures	Hard	(South Korea) Daniel Yoo	6–3, 1–0 ret.
Win	6–3	Oct 2017	Estonia F2, Tartu	Futures	Carpet	(Czech Republic) Zdeněk Kolář	6–3, 7–5
Loss	6–4	Jan 2018	Hong Kong F6	Futures	Hard	(Italy) Matteo Viola	6–3, 2–6, 6–7^{(5–7)}
Win	7–4	Feb 2018	Great Britain F2, Loughborough	Futures	Hard	(Belgium) Maxime Authom	7–6^{(7–2)}, 6–4
Win	8–4	Mar 2018	Israel F2, Ramat HaSharon	Futures	Hard	(Israel) Yshai Oliel	6–1, 6–3
Loss	8–5	May 2018	China F5, Wuhan	Futures	Hard	(China) Te Rigele	5–7, 4–6

=== Doubles: 61 (36 titles, 25 runner-ups) ===
Legend ATP Challenger (16–15) ITF Futures (20–10)	Finals by surface Hard (20–16) Clay (14–9) Grass (0–0) Carpet (2–0)

Result	W–L	Date	Tournament	Tier	Surface	Partner	Opponents	Score
Loss	0–1	Nov 2007	Helsinki, Finland	Challenger	Hard	(Finland) Henri Kontinen	(Russia) Mikhail Elgin (Russia) Alexander Kudryavtsev	6–4, 5–7, [11–13]
Win	1–1	Apr 2008	Great Britain F6, Exmouth	Futures	Carpet	(Finland) Henri Kontinen	(Germany) Ralph Granbow (United Kingdom) Ken Skupski	6–2, 6–2
Loss	1–2	Jun 2008	Italy F18, Trieste	Futures	Clay	(Finland) Tuomo Ojala	(Italy) Matteo Viola (Italy) Andrea Fava	2–6, 6–4, [1–10]
Win	2–2	Jul 2008	Estonia F1, Kuressaare	Futures	Clay	(Finland) Timo Nieminen	(Belarus) Pavel Katliarov (Romania) Bogdan-Victor Leonte	walkover
Loss	2–3	Aug 2008	Tampere, Finland	Challenger	Clay	(Finland) Henri Kontinen	(Sweden) Ervin Eleskovic (Sweden) Michael Ryderstedt	3–6, 4–6
Win	3–3	Jul 2009	Estonia F2, Kuressaare	Futures	Clay	(Finland) Henri Kontinen	(Estonia) Mait Künnap (Finland) Juho Paukku	6–3, 6–3
Win	4–3	Oct 2009	Thailand F5, Nakhon Ratchasima	Futures	Gard	(Czech Republic) Roman Jebavý	(New Zealand) Matt Simpson (New Zealand) William Ward	6–2, 6–2
Win	5–3	Apr 2010	Korea F2, Daegu	Futures	Hard	(Australia) Adam Feeney	(Japan) Hiroki Kondo (Chinese Taipei) Yi Chu-huan	6–2, 6–2
Win	6–3	Jun 2010	Norway F1, Gausdal	Futures	Hard	(Finland) Juho Paukku	(France) Fabrice Martin (Italy) Riccardo Ghedin	2–6, 6–4, [10–5]
Win	7–3	Jul 2010	Norway F2, Gausdal	Futures	Hard	(Finland) Juho Paukku	(Sweden) Stefan Borg (Sweden) Carl Bergman	6–3, 1–6, [10–7]
Loss	7–4	Jul 2010	Estonia F1, Kuressaare	Futures	Clay	(Sweden) Michael Ryderstedt	(Latvia) Andis Juška (Latvia) Deniss Pavlovs	5–7, 6–7^{(6–8)}
Win	8–4	Jul 2010	Estonia F2, Tallinn	Futures	Clay	(Finland) Juho Paukku	(Ukraine) Aleksandr Agafonov (Uruguay) Marcel Felder	6–3, 6–2
Win	9–4	Aug 2010	Finland F1, Vierumäki	Futures	Clay	(Finland) Juho Paukku	(Italy) Filippo Leonardi (Italy) Jacopo Marchegiani	6–1, 6–4
Loss	9–5	Oct 2010	China F8, Shanghai	Futures	Hard	(New Zealand) José Statham	(China) Mao-Xin Gong (China) Zhe Li	6–7^{(3–7)}, 6–7^{(6–8)}
Loss	9–6	Oct 2010	Japan F9, Kashiwa	Futures	Hard	(Japan) Bumpei Sato	(Japan) Yuichi Ito (Chinese Taipei) Yi Chu-huan	6–4, 1–6, [8–10]
Loss	9–7	Oct 2010	Japan F10, Tama	Futures	Hard	(Japan) Bumpei Sato	(Japan) Tasuku Iwami (Japan) Hiroki Kondo	2–6, 4–6
Loss	9–8	Jan 2011	Great Britain F1, Glasgow	Futures	Hard	(Finland) Juho Paukku	(United Kingdom) Chris Eaton (United Kingdom) Alexander Slabinsky	7–6^{(7–3)}, 1–6, [2–10]
Loss	9–9	Mar 2011	Pingguo, China	Challenger	Hard	(New Zealand) José Statham	(Russia) Mikhail Elgin (Russia) Alexander Kudryavtsev	3–6, 2–6
Win	10–9	May 2011	Uzbekistan F1, Andijan	Futures	Hard	(Russia) Ervind Gasparyan	(Belarus) Andrei Vasilevski (Russia) Alexander Rumyantsev	6–4, 7–5
Win	11–9	Jun 2011	Spain F20, Martos	Futures	Hard	(Ukraine) Denys Molchanov	(Russia) Ilya Belyaev (Canada) Steven Diez	6–3, 6–4
Win	12–9	Jun 2011	Spain F21, Melilla	Futures	Hard	(Ukraine) Denys Molchanov	(Spain) Jamie Pulgar-Garcia (Spain) Javier Pulgar-Garcia	6–2, 7–6^{(7–2)}
Loss	12–10	Aug 2011	Beijing, China	Challenger	Hard	(Sweden) Michael Ryderstedt	(Thailand) Sonchat Ratiwatana (Thailand) Sanchai Ratiwatana	7–6^{(7–4)}, 3–6, [3–10]
Loss	12–11	Aug 2011	Astana, Kazakhstan	Challenger	Hard	(Ukraine) Denys Molchanov	(India) Karan Rastogi (India) Vishnu Vardhan	6–7^{(2–7)}, 6–2, [8–10]
Win	13–11	Sep 2011	Tashkent, Uzbekistan	Challenger	Hard	(Ukraine) Denys Molchanov	(South Africa) Raven Klaasen (United States) John Paul Fruttero	7–6^{(7–5)}, 7–6^{(7–3)}
Loss	13–12	Oct 2011	Indonesia F5, Palembang	Futures	Hard	(Japan) Hiroki Kondo	(Thailand) Danai Udomchoke (Chinese Taipei) Jimmy Wang	0–6, 1–6
Loss	13–13	Jun 2012	Romania F3, Bacău	Futures	Clay	(Finland) Timo Nieminen	(Romania) Marius Copil (Romania) Victor Crivoi	3–6, 4–6
Loss	13–14	Jul 2012	Braunschweig, Germany	Challenger	Clay	(Ukraine) Denys Molchanov	(Poland) Mateusz Kowalczyk (Poland) Tomasz Bednarek	5–7, 7–6^{(7–1)}, [8–10]
Loss	13–15	Jul 2015	Tampere, Finland	Challenger	Clay	(Finland) Patrik Niklas-Salminen	(Brazil) André Ghem (France) Tristan Lamasine	6–7^{(5–7)}, 6–7^{(4–7)}
Win	14–15	Sep 2017	Tunisia F27, Hammamet	Futures	Clay	(United States) Evan Zhu	(Brazil) Luís Britto (Brazil) Marcelo Zormann	6–1, 6–4
Win	15–15	Oct 2017	Estonia F2, Tartu	Futures	Carpet	(Finland) Patrik Niklas-Salminen	(Russia) Evgenii Tiurnev (Russia) Vladimir Polyakov	6–1, 7–6^{(7–3)}
Win	16–15	Nov 2017	Estonia F3, Tallinn	Futures	Hard	(Finland) Patrik Niklas-Salminen	(Belgium) Maxime Authom (France) Grégoire Barrère	6–2, 6–3
Win	17–15	Feb 2018	Great Britain F2, Loughborough	Futures	Hard	(Denmark) Frederik Nielsen	(United Kingdom) Luke Johnson (United Kingdom) Jack Findel-hawkins	6–4, 6–1
Loss	17–16	Feb 2018	Great Britain F3, Shrewsbury	Futures	Hard	(Denmark) Frederik Nielsen	(United Kingdom) Scott Clayton (United Kingdom) Marcus Willis	2–6, 5–7
Win	18–16	Mar 2018	Israel F2, Ramat HaSharon	Futures	Hard	(Finland) Patrik Niklas-Salminen	(Ukraine) Marat Deviatiarov (Ukraine) Volodymyr Uzhylovskyi	6–3, 6–2
Loss	18–17	Mar 2018	Israel F3, Tel Aviv	Futures	Hard	(Finland) Patrik Niklas-Salminen	(Ukraine) Danylo Kalenichenko (Ukraine) Volodymyr Uzhylovskyi	5–7, 3–6
Win	19–17	May 2018	China F5, Wuhan	Futures	Hard	(Finland) Patrik Niklas-Salminen	(Japan) Shintaro Imai (Japan) Yuta Shimizu	6–1, 6–7^{(5–7)}, [10–4]
Win	20–17	May 2018	China F6, Luan	Futures	Hard	(Finland) Patrik Niklas-Salminen	(China) Gao Xin (China) Te Rigele	6–2, 6–3
Win	21–17	Jul 2018	Båstad, Sweden	Challenger	Clay	(Switzerland) Henri Laaksonen	(Czech Republic) Zdeněk Kolář (Portugal) Gonçalo Oliveira	6–4, 6–3
Win	22–17	Sep 2018	Switzerland F5, Schlieren	Futures	Clay	(Finland) Patrik Niklas-Salminen	(Czech Republic) David Škoch (Czech Republic) Petr Nouza	6–3, 6–1
Loss	22–18	Oct 2018	Fairfield, United States	Challenger	Hard	(Switzerland) Henri Laaksonen	(Thailand) Sanchai Ratiwatana (Indonesia) Christopher Rungkat	0–6, 6–7^{(9–11)}
Win	23–18	Nov 2018	Charlottesville, United States	Challenger	Hard	(Switzerland) Henri Laaksonen	(Japan) Toshihide Matsui (Denmark) Frederik Nielsen	6–3, 6–4
Win	24–18	Jul 2019	Amersfoort, Netherlands	Challenger	Clay	(Finland) Emil Ruusuvuori	(Netherlands) Jesper De Jong (Netherlands) Ryan Nijboer	6–3, 6–4
Win	25–18	Oct 2019	Nur-Sultan, Kazakhstan	Challenger	Hard	(Ukraine) Illya Marchenko	(Poland) Szymon Walków (Poland) Karol Drzewiecki	6–4, 6–4
Win	26–18	Nov 2019	Playford, Australia	Challenger	Hard	(Finland) Patrik Niklas-Salminen	(Philippines) Ruben Gonzales (United States) Evan King	6–4, 6–7^{(4–7)}, [10–7]
Win	27–18	Feb 2020	Burnie, Australia	Challenger	Hard	(Netherlands) Sem Verbeek	(Switzerland) Luca Margaroli (Italy) Andrea Vavassori	7–6^{(7–5)}, 7–6^{(7–4)}
Win	28–18	Oct 2020	Biella, Italy	Challenger	Clay	(Poland) Szymon Walków	(United Kingdom) Lloyd Glasspool (United States) Alex Lawson	7–5, 6–3
Loss	28–19	Oct 2020	Barcelona, Spain	Challenger	Clay	(United States) Alex Lawson	(Austria) Tristan-Samuel Weissborn (Poland) Szymon Walków	1–6, 6–4, [8–10]
Loss	28–20	Oct 2020	Lisbon, Portugal	Challenger	Clay	(Czech Republic) Zdeněk Kolář	(Dominican Republic) Roberto Cid Subervi (Portugal) Gonçalo Oliveira	6–7^{(5–7)}, 6–4, [4–10]
Win	29–20	Nov 2020	Bratislava, Slovakia	Challenger	Hard	(Finland) Emil Ruusuvuori	(Slovakia) Lukas Klein (Slovakia) Alex Molčan	6–4, 6–3
Loss	29–21	Dec 2020	Maia, Portugal	Challenger	Clay	(United Kingdom) Lloyd Glasspool	(Italy) Andrea Vavassori (Czech Republic) Zdeněk Kolář	3–6, 4–6
Loss	29–22	Jan 2021	Istanbul, Turkey	Challenger	Hard	(United Kingdom) Lloyd Glasspool	(Netherlands) David Pel (Sweden) André Göransson	6–4, 3–6, [8–10]
Loss	29–23	Feb 2021	Biella, Italy	Challenger	Hard	(United Kingdom) Lloyd Glasspool	(France) Hugo Nys (Germany) Tim Pütz	6–7^{(4–7)}, 3–6
Win	30–23	Feb 2021	Gran Canaria, Spain	Challenger	Clay	(United Kingdom) Lloyd Glasspool	(Belgium) Kimmer Coppejans (Spain) Sergio Martos Gornés	7–5, 6–1
Win	31–23	Oct 2021	Barcelona, Spain	Challenger	Clay	(Czech Republic) Roman Jebavý	(Portugal) Nuno Borges (Portugal) Francisco Cabral	6–4, 6–3
Loss	31–24	Nov 2021	Bergamo, Italy	Challenger	Hard (i)	(United Kingdom) Lloyd Glasspool	(Czech Republic) Zdeněk Kolář (Czech Republic) Jiří Lehečka	4–6, 4–6
Win	32–24	Nov 2021	Roanne, France	Challenger	Hard (i)	(United Kingdom) Lloyd Glasspool	(Monaco) Romain Arneodo (France) Albano Olivetti	7–6^{(7–5)}, 6–7^{(5–7)}, [12–10]
Loss	32–25	Nov 2021	Helsinki, Finland	Challenger	Hard (i)	(Netherlands) Jean-Julien Rojer	(Austria) Alexander Erler (Austria) Lucas Miedler	3–6, 6–7^{(2–7)}
Win	33–25	Nov 2021	Bari, Italy	Challenger	Hard	(United Kingdom) Lloyd Glasspool	(Italy) Andrea Vavassori (Spain) David Vega Hernández	6–3, 6–0
Win	34–25	May 2023	Bordeaux, France	Challenger	Clay	(United Kingdom) Lloyd Glasspool	(France) Sadio Doumbia (France) Fabien Reboul	6–4, 6–2
Win	35–25	Apr 2024	Madrid, Spain	Challenger	Clay	(United Kingdom) Henry Patten	(Argentina) Guido Andreozzi (Mexico) Miguel Ángel Reyes-Varela	7–5, 7–6^{(7–1)}
Win	36–25	May 2024	Turin, Italy	Challenger	Clay	(United Kingdom) Henry Patten	(Germany) Andreas Mies (United Kingdom) Neal Skupski	6–3, 6–3
