= 2012 Sparkassen Open – Singles =

Singles
- 2012 Sparkassen Open

Final
- Champion: (Brazil) Thomaz Bellucci
- Runner-up: (Germany) Tobias Kamke
- Score: 7–6^{(7–4)}, 6–3

Events
Singles	Doubles
← 2011 ·	Sparkassen Open	· 2013 →

Lukáš Rosol was the defending champion but decided not to participate.
Thomaz Bellucci defeated Tobias Kamke 7–6^{(7–4)}, 6–3 in the final to win the tournament.

== Seeds ==
1. (Argentina) Carlos Berlocq (first round)
2. (Brazil) Thomaz Bellucci (champion)
3. (Spain) Rubén Ramírez Hidalgo (first round)
4. (Germany) Tobias Kamke (final)
5. (Germany) Björn Phau (semifinals)
6. (Estonia) Jürgen Zopp (second round)
7. (Argentina) Horacio Zeballos (quarterfinals)
8. (Czech Republic) Jan Hájek (quarterfinals)

== Draw ==
=== Key ===
- Q = Qualifier
- WC = Wild card
- LL = Lucky loser
- Alt = Alternate
- SE = Special exempt
- PR = Protected ranking
- ITF = ITF entry
- JE = Junior exempt
- w/o = Walkover
- r = Retired
- d = Defaulted
- SR = Special ranking

=== Finals ===
Semifinals
5	(Germany) Björn Phau	6^{8}	5
4	(Germany) Tobias Kamke	7^{10}	7
(Italy) Simone Bolelli	2	1
2	(Brazil) Thomaz Bellucci	6	6

Final
4	(Germany) Tobias Kamke	6^{4}	3
2	(Brazil) Thomaz Bellucci	7^{7}	6

=== Top half ===
First round
1/WC	(Argentina) C Berlocq	6^{2}	3
WC	(Germany) Jan-Lennard Struff	7^{7}	6
(Russia) T Gabashvili	4	3
(Brazil) J Souza	6	6
(Germany) M Berrer	6	6
(Brazil) J Silva	2	1
(Netherlands) I Sijsling	4	0
5	(Germany) B Phau	6	6
4	(Germany) T Kamke	6	6
WC	(Germany) Peter Heller	3	3
Q	(Slovakia) F Horanský	4	3
(Portugal) F Gil	6	6
(Kazakhstan) A Golubev	7	7
(Italy) A Giannessi	5	5
Q	(Poland) M Przysiężny	1	1
7	(Argentina) H Zeballos	6	6

Second round
WC	(Germany) Jan-Lennard Struff	5	7^{7}	6
(Brazil) J Souza	7	6^{5}	0
(Germany) M Berrer	3	3
5	(Germany) B Phau	6	6
4	(Germany) T Kamke	6	7
(Portugal) F Gil	2	5
(Kazakhstan) A Golubev	3	4
7	(Argentina) H Zeballos	6	6

Quarterfinals
WC	(Germany) Jan-Lennard Struff	4	5
5	(Germany) B Phau	6	7
4	(Germany) T Kamke	7^{7}	6^{4}	6
7	(Argentina) H Zeballos	6^{3}	7^{7}	4

Semifinals
5	(Germany) B Phau	6^{8}	5
4	(Germany) T Kamke	7^{10}	7

=== Bottom half ===
First round
6	(Estonia) J Zopp	6	7
(France) J Dasnières de Veigy	3	5
(Italy) S Bolelli	7^{7}	4
(Russia) E Donskoy	6^{1}	0^{r}
(Argentina) F Delbonis	7	2
SE	(Spain) T Robredo	5	1^{r}
(Spain) R Bautista-Agut	6	6
3	(Spain) R Ramírez Hidalgo	2	3
8	(Czech Republic) J Hájek	6	6
(Turkey) M İlhan	1	4
Q	(Uzbekistan) F Dustov	4	2
WC	(Germany) J Reister	6	6
(Spain) D Muñoz de la Nava	6	6
Q	(Ukraine) A Smirnov	2	2
(Italy) M Viola	6	2	3
2	(Brazil) T Bellucci	3	6	6

Second round
6	(Estonia) J Zopp	4	2
(Italy) S Bolelli	6	6
(Argentina) F Delbonis	1	6^{6}
(Spain) R Bautista-Agut	6	7^{8}
8	(Czech Republic) J Hájek	6^{1}	6	6
WC	(Germany) J Reister	7^{7}	3	2
(Spain) D Muñoz de la Nava	4	4
2	(Brazil) T Bellucci	6	6

Quarterfinals
(Italy) S Bolelli	6	6
(Spain) R Bautista-Agut	3	2
8	(Czech Republic) J Hájek	3	0
2	(Brazil) T Bellucci	6	6

Semifinals
(Italy) S Bolelli	2	1
2	(Brazil) T Bellucci	6	6
