= 2009 Nord LB Open – Singles =

Singles
- 2009 Nord LB Open

Final
- Champion: (Spain) Óscar Hernández
- Runner-up: (Russia) Teymuraz Gabashvili
- Score: 6–1, 3–6, 6–4

Events
Singles	Doubles
← 2008 ·	Nord LB Open	· 2010 →

Nicolas Devilder, the champion in 2008, was eliminated by Adam Vejmělka in the first round.
Óscar Hernández defeated Teymuraz Gabashvili 6–1, 3–6, 6–4 in the final.

== Seeds ==
1. (Germany) Andreas Beck (semifinals)
2. (Belgium) Christophe Rochus (first round)
3. (Spain) Óscar Hernández (champion)
4. (Czech Republic) ~~Ivo Minář~~ (withdrew)
5. (Germany) Björn Phau (first round)
6. (Belgium) Kristof Vliegen (quarterfinals)
7. (Russia) Teymuraz Gabashvili (final)
8. (Spain) Alberto Martín (quarterfinals)

== Draw ==
Key

- Q = Qualifier
- WC = Wild card
- LL = Lucky loser
- Alt = Alternate
- ITF = ITF entry
- PR = Protected ranking
- SR = Special ranking
- SE = Special exempt
- JE = Junior exempt
- JR = Junior Accelerator Programme entrant
- CO = College Accelerator Programme entrant
- NG = Next Gen Accelerator Program entrant
- w/o = Walkover
- r = Retired
- d = Defaulted

=== Final four ===
Semifinals
1	(Germany) Andreas Beck	2	1
7	(Russia) Teymuraz Gabashvili	6	6
3	(Spain) Óscar Hernández	6	5
WC	(Germany) Florian Mayer	4	0^{r}

Final
7	(Russia) Teymuraz Gabashvili	1	6	4
3	(Spain) Óscar Hernández	6	3	6

=== Top half ===
First round
1	(Germany) A Beck	4	6	6
(France) A Mannarino	6	2	3
(Spain) P Andújar	4	4
WC	(Germany) D Meffert	6	6
(Spain) M Granollers	6	2	3
Q	(Czech Republic) J Minář	4	6	6
(France) J Ouanna	6^{4}	0^{r}
8	(Spain) A Martín	7	3
Q	(Czech Republic) A Vejmělka	6	6
(France) N Devilder	1	4
(Czech Republic) L Rosol	7	6
Q	(Argentina) F del Bonis	6^{3}	3
SE	(Germany) J Reister	6	6
WC	(Germany) M Bachinger	2	3
LL	(Spain) C Poch-Gradin	3	4
7	(Russia) T Gabashvili	6	6

Second round
1	(Germany) A Beck	6	0	6
WC	(Germany) D Meffert	4	6	4
Q	(Czech Republic) J Minář	6^{3}	2
8	(Spain) A Martín	7	6
Q	(Czech Republic) A Vejmělka	4	2
(Czech Republic) L Rosol	6	6
SE	(Germany) J Reister	3	4
7	(Russia) T Gabashvili	6	6

Quarterfinals
1	(Germany) A Beck	2	6	7
8	(Spain) A Martín	6	4	6^{5}
(Czech Republic) L Rosol	6^{4}	1
7	(Russia) T Gabashvili	7	6

Semifinals
1	(Germany) A Beck	2	1
7	(Russia) T Gabashvili	6	6

=== Bottom half ===
First round
5	(Germany) B Phau	4	1
(Chile) N Massú	6	6
Q	(Germany) T Kamke	1	4
(Germany) D Brands	6	6
(Ecuador) N Lapentti	2	6	5
(Slovakia) D Hrbatý	6	4	7
(France) A Sidorenko	2	6^{3}
3	(Spain) Ó Hernández	6	7
6	(Belgium) K Vliegen	6	6
(Algeria) L Ouahab	3	2
(Argentina) B Dabul	7	6
WC	(Germany) J-F Brunken	6^{4}	3
(Argentina) G Cañas	2	6	6^{2}
(Uruguay) P Cuevas	6	3	7
WC	(Germany) F Mayer	6	6
2	(Belgium) C Rochus	3	1

Second round
(Chile) N Massú	4	6	6
(Germany) D Brands	6	4	2
(Slovakia) D Hrbatý	3	2
3	(Spain) Ó Hernández	6	6
6	(Belgium) K Vliegen	6	6
(Argentina) B Dabul	1	3
(Uruguay) P Cuevas	4	6	4
WC	(Germany) F Mayer	6	3	6

Quarterfinals
(Chile) N Massú	3	3
3	(Spain) Ó Hernández	6	6
6	(Belgium) K Vliegen	6^{4}	4
WC	(Germany) F Mayer	7	6

Semifinals
3	(Spain) Ó Hernández	6	5
WC	(Germany) F Mayer	4	0^{r}
