= 2021 Open Città di Bari – Singles =

Singles
- 2021 Open Città di Bari

Final
- Champion: (Germany) Oscar Otte
- Runner-up: (Germany) Daniel Masur
- Score: 7–5, 7–5

Events
Singles	Doubles
Open Città di Bari	· 2022 →

This was the first edition of the tournament.

Oscar Otte won the title after defeating Daniel Masur 7–5, 7–5 in the final.

== Seeds ==
1. (Spain) Carlos Taberner (second round)
2. (Denmark) Holger Rune (first round, retired)
3. (Germany) Oscar Otte (champion)
4. (United States) Maxime Cressy (first round)
5. (Serbia) Nikola Milojević (first round)
6. (Italy) Federico Gaio (first round)
7. (Italy) Roberto Marcora (first round)
8. (Germany) Daniel Masur (final)

== Draw ==
=== Key ===
- Q = Qualifier
- WC = Wild card
- LL = Lucky loser
- Alt = Alternate
- SE = Special exempt
- PR = Protected ranking
- ITF = ITF entry
- JE = Junior exempt
- w/o = Walkover
- r = Retired
- d = Defaulted
- SR = Special ranking

=== Finals ===
Semifinals
(Italy) Thomas Fabbiano	4	4
3	(Germany) Oscar Otte	6	6
8	(Germany) Daniel Masur	7	3	7^{7}
(Italy) Andrea Vavassori	5	6	6^{5}

Final
3	(Germany) Oscar Otte	7	7
8	(Germany) Daniel Masur	5	5

=== Top half ===
First round
1	(Spain) C Taberner	6	6
Q	(Switzerland) A Bellier	2	2
(Italy) R Brancaccio	6	6
WC	(Italy) Luca Potenza	2	3
(Germany) Y Maden	6^{5}	1
(United Kingdom) J Draper	7^{7}	6
(Italy) T Fabbiano	7^{10}	6
7	(Italy) R Marcora	6^{8}	3
3	(Germany) O Otte	6	6
WC	(Ukraine) O Ovcharenko	3	4
Q	(Germany) S Fanselow	4	6	7
(Switzerland) D Stricker	6	4	5
(Spain) N Sánchez Izquierdo	6	2	0
(Italy) F Cobolli	3	6	6
(Germany) T Kamke	6	6
6	(Italy) F Gaio	3	4

Second round
1	(Spain) C Taberner	6^{6}	3
(Italy) R Brancaccio	7^{8}	6
(United Kingdom) J Draper	4	3
(Italy) T Fabbiano	6	6
3	(Germany) O Otte	6	6^{3}	7
Q	(Germany) S Fanselow	3	7^{7}	5
(Italy) F Cobolli	7^{12}	2	6
(Germany) T Kamke	6^{10}	6	1

Quarterfinals
(Italy) R Brancaccio	2	7	2
(Italy) T Fabbiano	6	5	6
3	(Germany) O Otte	6	6
(Italy) F Cobolli	3	3

Semifinals
(Italy) T Fabbiano	4	4
3	(Germany) O Otte	6	6

=== Bottom half ===
First round
8	(Germany) D Masur	6	6
Q	(Italy) Fabrizio Andaloro	4	4
(Italy) F Forti	6	4	6
Q	(Italy) F Maestrelli	4	6	3
(Germany) J Lenz	7	5	6
(Netherlands) T van Rijthoven	5	7	4
WC	(Italy) L Nardi	6	6
4	(United States) M Cressy	4	1
5	(Serbia) N Milojević	1	5
(Italy) A Vavassori	6	7
(Germany) M Bachinger	6	4	4
(Italy) A Pellegrino	4	6	6
PR	(Italy) F Baldi	6	6
(Russia) P Kotov	0	4
(Italy) A Arnaboldi	6	1
2	(Denmark) H Rune	4	0^{r}

Second round
8	(Germany) D Masur	6^{7}	7^{7}	6
(Italy) F Forti	7^{9}	6^{1}	3
(Germany) J Lenz	3	2
WC	(Italy) L Nardi	6	6
(Italy) A Vavassori	4	7^{12}	6
(Italy) A Pellegrino	6	6^{10}	2
PR	(Italy) F Baldi	6	3	6
(Italy) A Arnaboldi	4	6	3

Quarterfinals
8	(Germany) D Masur	7^{7}	6^{6}	6
WC	(Italy) L Nardi	6^{5}	7^{8}	4
(Italy) A Vavassori	3	3
PR	(Italy) F Baldi	6	1^{r}

Semifinals
8	(Germany) D Masur	7	3	7^{7}
(Italy) A Vavassori	5	6	6^{5}
