= 2011 Sparkassen Open – Singles =

Singles
- 2011 Sparkassen Open

Final
- Champion: (Czech Republic) Lukáš Rosol
- Runner-up: (Russia) Evgeny Donskoy
- Score: 7–5, 7–6(7–2)

Events
Singles	Doubles
← 2010 ·	Sparkassen Open	· 2012 →

Mikhail Kukushkin was the defending champion, but decided not to participate.

3rd seed Lukáš Rosol defeated qualifier Evgeny Donskoy 7–5, 7–6(7–2) in the final.

== Seeds ==
1. (Spain) Pere Riba (second round)
2. (Germany) Tobias Kamke (second round)
3. (Czech Republic) Lukáš Rosol (champion)
4. (Portugal) Frederico Gil (quarterfinals)
5. (Portugal) Rui Machado (second round)
6. (Netherlands) Thomas Schoorel (quarterfinals)
7. (Germany) Mischa Zverev (second round)
8. (Turkey) Marsel İlhan (second round)

== Draw ==
Key

- Q = Qualifier
- WC = Wild card
- LL = Lucky loser
- Alt = Alternate
- ITF = ITF entry
- PR = Protected ranking
- SR = Special ranking
- SE = Special exempt
- JE = Junior exempt
- JR = Junior Accelerator Programme entrant
- CO = College Accelerator Programme entrant
- NG = Next Gen Accelerator Program entrant
- w/o = Walkover
- r = Retired
- d = Defaulted

=== Finals ===
Semifinals
(France) Stéphane Robert	6	3	3
Q	(Russia) Evgeny Donskoy	1	6	6
3	(Czech Republic) Lukáš Rosol	6	6
SE	(Czech Republic) Jan Hájek	3	1

Final
Q	(Russia) Evgeny Donskoy	5	2
3	(Czech Republic) Lukáš Rosol	7	6

=== Top half ===
First round
1	(Spain) P Riba	6	7
(Netherlands) J Huta Galung	2	5
(France) É Prodon	3	2
(France) S Robert	6	6
SE	(Germany) B Phau	1	6	2
(Argentina) H Zeballos	6	3	6
Q	(Germany) D Meffert	6	4	6^{7}
7	(Germany) M Zverev	4	6	7
4	(Portugal) F Gil	6	6
(Czech Republic) I Minář	4	1
Q	(Romania) V Crivoi	4	4
Q	(Chile) J Peralta	6	6
Q	(Russia) E Donskoy	6	6
(Belgium) S Darcis	4	4
(France) V Millot	6	3	3
8	(Turkey) M İlhan	4	6	6

Second round
1	(Spain) P Riba	5	6	3
(France) S Robert	7	2	6
(Argentina) H Zeballos	3	6	6
7	(Germany) M Zverev	6	1	4
4	(Portugal) F Gil	6^{5}	6	6
Q	(Chile) J Peralta	7	2	4
Q	(Russia) E Donskoy	7	6
8	(Turkey) M İlhan	6^{4}	4

Quarterfinals
(France) S Robert	3	7	6
(Argentina) H Zeballos	6	6^{7}	2
4	(Portugal) F Gil	4	6^{3}
Q	(Russia) E Donskoy	6	7

Semifinals
(France) S Robert	6	3	3
Q	(Russia) E Donskoy	1	6	6

=== Bottom half ===
First round
6	(Netherlands) T Schoorel	7	6
WC	(Germany) C-M Stebe	6^{7}	4
WC	(Austria) T Muster	6	3	4
(Russia) T Gabashvili	3	6	6
(Germany) A Beck	5	6^{2}
(Germany) J Reister	7	7^{7}
(Germany) D Brands	6^{3}	3
3	(Czech Republic) L Rosol	7	6
5	(Portugal) R Machado	7	6
WC	(Germany) Jaan-Frederik Brunken	6^{3}	4
(Czech Republic) J Pospíšil	7	3	6
WC	(Germany) Jan-Lennard Struff	6^{4}	6	1
(Italy) P Lorenzi	3	4
SE	(Czech Republic) J Hájek	6	6
(France) B Paire	4	5
2	(Germany) T Kamke	6	7

Second round
6	(Netherlands) T Schoorel	6	6^{5}	7
(Russia) T Gabashvili	3	7	5
(Germany) J Reister	3	6^{3}
3	(Czech Republic) L Rosol	6	7
5	(Portugal) R Machado	2	3
(Czech Republic) J Pospíšil	6	6
SE	(Czech Republic) J Hájek	1	6	6
2	(Germany) T Kamke	6	3	3

Quarterfinals
6	(Netherlands) T Schoorel	6^{5}	7^{7}	1
3	(Czech Republic) L Rosol	7	6^{1}	6
(Czech Republic) J Pospíšil	4	4
SE	(Czech Republic) J Hájek	6	6

Semifinals
3	(Czech Republic) L Rosol	6	6
SE	(Czech Republic) J Hájek	3	1
