= 2012 Sparkassen Open – Doubles =

Doubles
- 2012 Sparkassen Open

Final
- Champions: (Poland) Tomasz Bednarek (Poland) Mateusz Kowalczyk
- Runners-up: (Finland) Harri Heliövaara (Ukraine) Denys Molchanov
- Score: 7–5, 6–7^{(1–7)}, [10–8]

Events
Singles	Doubles
← 2011 ·	Sparkassen Open	· 2013 →

Martin Emmrich and Andreas Siljeström were the defending champions but decided not to participate.
Tomasz Bednarek and Mateusz Kowalczyk won the final against Harri Heliövaara and Denys Molchanov 7–5, 6–7^{(1–7)}, [10–8].

== Seeds ==
1. (Colombia) Juan Sebastián Cabal / (Colombia) Robert Farah (first round)
2. (Czech Republic) Lukáš Dlouhý / (Slovakia) Michal Mertiňák (first round)
3. (Argentina) Carlos Berlocq / (Uruguay) Marcel Felder (first round)
4. (France) Olivier Charroin / (Australia) Colin Ebelthite (quarterfinals)

== Draw ==
=== Key ===
- Q = Qualifier
- WC = Wild card
- LL = Lucky loser
- Alt = Alternate
- SE = Special exempt
- PR = Protected ranking
- ITF = ITF entry
- JE = Junior exempt
- w/o = Walkover
- r = Retired
- d = Defaulted
- SR = Special ranking

=== Draw ===
First round
1	(Colombia) JS Cabal (Colombia) R Farah	2	6^{5}
(Spain) D Muñoz de la Nava (Spain) R Ramírez Hidalgo	6	7^{7}
(Australia) R Junaid (Germany) P Marx	6^{4}	6^{4}
(Poland) T Bednarek (Poland) M Kowalczyk	7^{7}	7^{7}
4	(France) O Charroin (Australia) C Ebelthite	6	6^{5}	[10]
(Spain) R Bautista-Agut (Estonia) J Zopp	4	7^{7}	[7]
(United States) N Monroe (Canada) A Shamasdin	6	6
WC	(Italy) A Giannessi (Italy) M Viola	3	3
WC	(Germany) T Kamke (Germany) J Reister	3	2
(Argentina) F Delbonis (Brazil) J Souza	6	6
(Germany) M Berrer (Portugal) F Gil	2	6	[10]
3	(Argentina) C Berlocq (Uruguay) M Felder	6	2	[6]
(Italy) A Motti (India) P Raja	7	4	[10]
WC	(Russia) V Baluda (Germany) Jaan-Frederik Brunken	5	6	[7]
(Finland) H Heliövaara (Ukraine) D Molchanov	6	6
2	(Czech Republic) L Dlouhý (Slovakia) M Mertiňák	4	3

Quarterfinals
(Spain) D Muñoz de la Nava (Spain) R Ramírez Hidalgo	6	5	[7]
(Poland) T Bednarek (Poland) M Kowalczyk	1	7	[10]
4	(France) O Charroin (Australia) C Ebelthite	5	6	[5]
(United States) N Monroe (Canada) A Shamasdin	7	3	[10]
(Argentina) F Delbonis (Brazil) J Souza	4	6	[17]
(Germany) M Berrer (Portugal) F Gil	6	3	[15]
(Italy) A Motti (India) P Raja	4	2
(Finland) H Heliövaara (Ukraine) D Molchanov	6	6

Semifinals
(Poland) T Bednarek (Poland) M Kowalczyk	3	6	[10]
(United States) N Monroe (Canada) A Shamasdin	6	3	[8]
(Argentina) F Delbonis (Brazil) J Souza	6	2	[8]
(Finland) H Heliövaara (Ukraine) D Molchanov	2	6	[10]

Final
(Poland) T Bednarek (Poland) M Kowalczyk	7	6^{1}	[10]
(Finland) H Heliövaara (Ukraine) D Molchanov	5	7^{7}	[8]
