= 2012 Sparkassen Open =

- Date: 2–8 July
- Edition: 19th
- Surface: Clay
- Location: Braunschweig, Germany

Champions

Singles
- (Brazil) Thomaz Bellucci

Doubles
- (Poland) Tomasz Bednarek / (Poland) Mateusz Kowalczyk
← 2011 ·	Sparkassen Open	· 2013 →

The 2012 Sparkassen Open was a professional tennis tournament played on clay courts. It was the 19th edition of the tournament which was part of the 2012 ATP Challenger Tour. It took place in Braunschweig, Germany between 2 and 8 July 2012.

== Singles main draw entrants ==
=== Seeds ===
Country	Player	Rank^{1}	Seed
ARG	Carlos Berlocq	37	1
BRA	Thomaz Bellucci	80	2
ESP	Rubén Ramírez Hidalgo	82	3
GER	Tobias Kamke	84	4
GER	Björn Phau	88	5
EST	Jürgen Zopp	95	6
ARG	Horacio Zeballos	98	7
CZE	Jan Hájek	105	8

- ^{1} Rankings are as of June 25, 2012.

=== Other entrants ===
The following players received wildcards into the singles main draw:

- (Argentina) Carlos Berlocq
- (Germany) Peter Heller
- (Germany) Julian Reister
- (Germany) Jan-Lennard Struff

The following players received entry as a special exempt into the singles main draw:

- (Spain) Tommy Robredo

The following players received entry from the qualifying draw:

- (Uzbekistan) Farrukh Dustov
- (Slovakia) Filip Horanský
- (Poland) Michał Przysiężny
- (Ukraine) Artem Smirnov

== Champions ==
=== Singles ===
- (Brazil) Thomaz Bellucci def. (Germany) Tobias Kamke, 7–6^{(7–4)}, 6–3

=== Doubles ===
- (Poland) Tomasz Bednarek / (Poland) Mateusz Kowalczyk def. (Finland) Harri Heliövaara / (Ukraine) Denys Molchanov, 7–5, 6–7^{(1–7)}, [10–8]
