= 2009 Nord LB Open – Doubles =

Doubles
- 2009 Nord LB Open

Final
- Champions: (Sweden) Johan Brunström (Netherlands Antilles) Jean-Julien Rojer
- Runners-up: (Argentina) Brian Dabul (Chile) Nicolás Massú
- Score: 7–6(2), 6–4

Events
Singles	Doubles
← 2008 ·	Nord LB Open	· 2010 →

Marco Crugnola and Óscar Hernández were the defending champions, but Crugnola chose not to defend 2009 title.
Hernández played with José Checa-Calvo and they were eliminated in the second round by Emilio Benfele Álvarez and Sander Groen.
Johan Brunström and Jean-Julien Rojer won the doubles competition. They won 7–6(2), 6–4 in the final, against Brian Dabul and Nicolás Massú.

== Seeds ==
1. (Sweden) Johan Brunström / (Netherlands Antilles) Jean-Julien Rojer (champions)
2. (Uruguay) Pablo Cuevas / (Spain) Marcel Granollers (semifinals, withdrew due to Cuevas' hand injury)
3. (Switzerland) Yves Allegro / (Germany) Michael Kohlmann (first round)
4. (United States) David Martin / (Switzerland) Jean-Claude Scherrer (quarterfinals)

== Draw ==
Key

- Q = Qualifier
- WC = Wild card
- LL = Lucky loser
- Alt = Alternate
- ITF = ITF entry
- PR = Protected ranking
- SR = Special ranking
- SE = Special exempt
- JE = Junior exempt
- JR = Junior Accelerator Programme entrant
- CO = College Accelerator Programme entrant
- NG = Next Gen Accelerator Program entrant
- w/o = Walkover
- r = Retired
- d = Defaulted

=== Draw ===
First round
1	(Sweden) J Brunström (Netherlands Antilles) J-J Rojer	6	6
(Spain) P Andújar (Spain) C Poch-Gradin	2	2
(Argentina) D Álvarez (Brazil) J Souza	6	6
(Russia) T Gabashvili (Algeria) L Ouhab	4	4
3	(Switzerland) Y Allegro (Germany) M Kohlmann	4	6	[3]
(Spain) J Checa-Calvo (Spain) Ó Hernández	6	3	[10]
WC	(Germany) M Lenz (Germany) J Luetjen	3	6	[5]
WC	(Spain) E Benfele Álvarez (Netherlands) S Groen	6	4	[10]
(Argentina) G Cañas (Argentina) S Prieto	6	2	[9]
(Argentina) B Dabul (Chile) N Massú	2	6	[11]
(Germany) J-F Brunken (Germany) J Reister	4	1
4	(United States) D Martin (Switzerland) J-C Scherrer	6	6
(Ecuador) N Lapentti (Spain) A Martín	6	7
(Czech Republic) J Minář (France) A Sidorenko	4	6^{4}
(Slovakia) D Hrbatý (Czech Republic) L Rosol	3	2
2	(Uruguay) P Cuevas (Spain) M Granollers	6	6

Quarterfinals
1	(Sweden) J Brunström (Netherlands Antilles) J-J Rojer	6	6
(Argentina) D Álvarez (Brazil) J Souza	4	4
(Spain) J Checa-Calvo (Spain) Ó Hernández	3	3
WC	(Spain) E Benfele Álvarez (Netherlands) S Groen	6	6
(Argentina) B Dabul (Chile) N Massú	6	7
4	(United States) D Martin (Switzerland) J-C Scherrer	2	5
(Ecuador) N Lapentti (Spain) A Martín	w/o
2	(Uruguay) P Cuevas (Spain) M Granollers

Semifinals
1	(Sweden) J Brunström (Netherlands Antilles) J-J Rojer	6	6
WC	(Spain) E Benfele Álvarez (Netherlands) S Groen	1	2
(Argentina) B Dabul (Chile) N Massú
2	(Uruguay) P Cuevas (Spain) M Granollers	w/o

Finals
1	(Sweden) J Brunström (Netherlands Antilles) J-J Rojer	7	6
(Argentina) B Dabul (Chile) N Massú	6^{2}	4
