= 2011 Sparkassen Open =

Tennis tournament

- Date: 26 June – 3 July
- Edition: 18th
- Location: Braunschweig, Germany

Champions

Singles
- (Czech Republic) Lukáš Rosol

Doubles
- (Germany) Martin Emmrich / (Sweden) Andreas Siljeström
← 2010 ·	Sparkassen Open	· 2012 →

The 2011 Sparkassen Open was a professional tennis tournament played on clay courts. It was the 18th edition of the tournament which was part of the 2011 ATP Challenger Tour. It took place in Braunschweig, Germany between June 26 and July 3, 2011.

== ATP entrants ==
=== Seeds ===
Country	Player	Rank^{1}	Seed
ESP	Pere Riba	71	1
GER	Tobias Kamke	83	2
CZE	Lukáš Rosol	85	3
POR	Frederico Gil	91	4
POR	Rui Machado	97	5
NED	Thomas Schoorel	99	6
GER	Mischa Zverev	101	7
TUR	Marsel İlhan	105	8

- ^{1} Rankings are as of June 20, 2011.

=== Other entrants ===
The following players received wildcards into the singles main draw:

- (Germany) Jaan-Frederik Brunken
- (Austria) Thomas Muster
- (Germany) Cedrik-Marcel Stebe
- (Germany) Jan-Lennard Struff

The following players received entry as a special exemption into the singles main draw:

- (Czech Republic) Jan Hájek
- (Germany) Björn Phau

The following players received entry from the qualifying draw:

- (Romania) Victor Crivoi
- (Russia) Evgeny Donskoy
- (Germany) Dominik Meffert
- (Chile) Júlio Peralta

== Champions ==
=== Singles ===
(Czech Republic) Lukáš Rosol def. (Russia) Evgeny Donskoy, 7–5, 7–6^{(7–2)}

=== Doubles ===
(Germany) Martin Emmrich / (Sweden) Andreas Siljeström def. (France) Olivier Charroin / (France) Stéphane Robert, 0–6, 6–4, [10–7]
