= 2009 Nord LB Open =

- Date: June 29 – July 5
- Edition: 16th
- Location: Braunschweig, Germany

Champions

Singles
- (Spain) Óscar Hernández

Doubles
- (Sweden) Johan Brunström / (Netherlands Antilles) Jean-Julien Rojer
← 2008 ·	Nord LB Open	· 2010 →

The 2009 Nord LB Open was a professional tennis tournament played on outdoor red clay courts. This was the 16th edition of the tournament which was part of the 2009 ATP Challenger Tour. It took place in Braunschweig, Germany between 29 June and 5 July 2009.

== Singles entrants ==
=== Seeds ===
Nationality	Player	Ranking*	Seeding
GER	Andreas Beck	58	1
BEL	Christophe Rochus	60	2
ESP	Óscar Hernández	75	3
CZE	~~Ivo Minář~~	~~78~~	~~4~~
GER	Björn Phau	79	5
BEL	Kristof Vliegen	82	6
RUS	Teymuraz Gabashvili	88	7
ESP	Alberto Martín	95	8

- Rankings are as of June 22, 2009.

=== Other entrants ===
The following players received wildcards into the singles main draw:

- (Germany) Matthias Bachinger
- (Germany) Jaan-Frederik Brunken
- (Germany) Florian Mayer
- (Germany) Dominik Meffert

The following player received entry as a special exempt:

- (Germany) Julian Reister

The following players received entry from the qualifying draw:

- (Argentina) Federico del Bonis
- (Germany) Tobias Kamke
- (Czech Republic) Jan Minář
- (Spain) Carles Poch-Gradin (as a Lucky Loser)
- (Czech Republic) Adam Vejmělka

== Champions ==
=== Singles ===
(Spain) Óscar Hernández def. (Russia) Teymuraz Gabashvili, 6–1, 3–6, 6–4

=== Doubles ===
(Sweden) Johan Brunström / (Netherlands Antilles) Jean-Julien Rojer def. (Argentina) Brian Dabul / (Chile) Nicolás Massú, 7–6(2), 6–4
