= 2021 Open Città di Bari – Doubles =

Doubles
- 2021 Open Città di Bari

Final
- Champions: (United Kingdom) Lloyd Glasspool (Finland) Harri Heliövaara
- Runners-up: (Italy) Andrea Vavassori (Spain) David Vega Hernández
- Score: 6–3, 6–0

Events
Singles	Doubles
Open Città di Bari	· 2022 →

This was the first edition of the tournament.

Lloyd Glasspool and Harri Heliövaara won the title after defeating Andrea Vavassori and David Vega Hernández 6–3, 6–0 in the final.

== Seeds ==
1. (United Kingdom) Lloyd Glasspool / (Finland) Harri Heliövaara (champions)
2. (Italy) Andrea Vavassori / (Spain) David Vega Hernández (final)
3. (Serbia) Ivan Sabanov / (Serbia) Matej Sabanov (quarterfinals)
4. (Croatia) Antonio Šančić / (Austria) Tristan-Samuel Weissborn (semifinals)

== Draw ==
=== Key ===
- Q = Qualifier
- WC = Wild card
- LL = Lucky loser
- Alt = Alternate
- ITF = ITF entry
- PR = Protected ranking
- SR = Special ranking
- SE = Special exempt
- JE = Junior exempt
- JR = Junior Accelerator Programme entrant
- CO = College Accelerator Programme entrant
- NG = Next Gen Accelerator Program entrant
- w/o = Walkover
- r = Retired
- d = Defaulted

First round
1	(United Kingdom) L Glasspool (Finland) H Heliövaara	7	6
PR	(Japan) T Matsui (Japan) K Uesugi	5	2
WC	(Italy) Lorenzo Bocchi (Italy) Gabriele Maria Noce	4	4
(Italy) M Bortolotti (Spain) S Martos Gornés	6	6
4	(Croatia) A Šančić (Austria) T-S Weissborn	6	6
(Italy) F Baldi (Italy) A Pellegrino	3	2
(Belgium) M Geerts (Germany) D Masur	6	6
(Romania) VV Cornea (Greece) Pe Tsitsipas	4	2
(Poland) K Drzewiecki (Poland) P Matuszewski	7	6
WC	(Italy) Emiliano Maggioli (Ukraine) O Ovcharenko	5	4
(Italy) R Brancaccio (Italy) F Cobolli	7^{7}	2	[8]
3	(Serbia) I Sabanov (Serbia) M Sabanov	6^{3}	6	[10]
WC	(Italy) M Gigante (Italy) Luca Potenza	7^{7}	3	[5]
(Italy) F Forti (Italy) L Nardi	6^{0}	6	[10]
(Germany) Elmar Ejupovic (Russia) P Kotov	3	7	[4]
2	(Italy) A Vavassori (Spain) D Vega Hernández	6	5	[10]

Quarterfinals
1	(United Kingdom) L Glasspool (Finland) H Heliövaara	4	6	[10]
(Italy) M Bortolotti (Spain) S Martos Gornés	6	3	[7]
4	(Croatia) A Šančić (Austria) T-S Weissborn	7	6
(Belgium) M Geerts (Germany) D Masur	5	1
(Poland) K Drzewiecki (Poland) P Matuszewski	6	7
3	(Serbia) I Sabanov (Serbia) M Sabanov	4	5
(Italy) F Forti (Italy) L Nardi	5	2
2	(Italy) A Vavassori (Spain) D Vega Hernández	7	6

Semifinals
1	(United Kingdom) L Glasspool (Finland) H Heliövaara	6	6
4	(Croatia) A Šančić (Austria) T-S Weissborn	2	4
(Poland) K Drzewiecki (Poland) P Matuszewski	4	6^{3}
2	(Italy) A Vavassori (Spain) D Vega Hernández	6	7^{7}

Final
1	(United Kingdom) L Glasspool (Finland) H Heliövaara	6	6
2	(Italy) A Vavassori (Spain) D Vega Hernández	3	0
