= 2010 Nord LB Open =

- Date: June 28 – July 4
- Edition: 17th
- Location: Braunschweig, Germany

Champions

Singles
- (Kazakhstan) Mikhail Kukushkin

Doubles
- (Portugal) Leonardo Tavares / (Italy) Simone Vagnozzi
← 2009 ·	Nord LB Open	· 2011 →

The 2010 Nord LB Open was a professional tennis tournament played on outdoor red clay courts. This was the 17th edition of the tournament which is part of the 2010 ATP Challenger Tour. It took place in Braunschweig, Germany between 28 June and 4 July 2010.

== ATP entrants ==
=== Seeds ===
Nationality	Player	Ranking*	Seeding
URU	~~Pablo Cuevas~~	~~56~~	~~1~~
GER	Andreas Beck	79	2
JAM	Dustin Brown	102	3
RUS	Igor Kunitsyn	104	4
BRA	Marcos Daniel	108	5
AUT	Daniel Köllerer	110	6
SVN	Grega Žemlja	112	7
KAZ	Mikhail Kukushkin	114	8
TUR	Marsel İlhan	118	9

- Rankings are as of June 21, 2010.

=== Other entrants ===
The following players received wildcards into the singles main draw:

- (Germany) Jaan-Frederik Brunken
- (Argentina) Gastón Gaudio
- (Germany) Peter Gojowczyk
- (Austria) Thomas Muster

The following player received entry as a special exempt:

- (Italy) Simone Vagnozzi

The following players received entry from the qualifying draw:

- (Austria) Marco Mirnegg
- (Czech Republic) Robin Vik
- (Sweden) Filip Prpic
- (Portugal) Leonardo Tavares (as a Lucky Loser)
- (Spain) Gabriel Trujillo-Soler

== Champions ==
=== Singles ===
(Kazakhstan) Mikhail Kukushkin def. (Brazil) Marcos Daniel, 6–2, 3–0 retired

=== Doubles ===
(Portugal) Leonardo Tavares / (Italy) Simone Vagnozzi def. (Russia) Igor Kunitsyn / (Kazakhstan) Yuri Schukin 7–5, 7–6(4)
