= 2010 Nord LB Open – Doubles =

Doubles
- 2010 Nord LB Open

Final
- Champion: (Portugal) Leonardo Tavares (Italy) Simone Vagnozzi
- Runner-up: (Russia) Igor Kunitsyn (Kazakhstan) Yuri Schukin
- Score: 7–5, 7–6(4)

Events
Singles	Doubles
- Nord LB Open

Johan Brunström and Jean-Julien Rojer were the defending champions, but Rojer chose not to compete this year.
Brunstrom partnered up with Mischa Zverev, but they lost in the first round against Pablo Santos and Ivan Sergeyev.
Leonardo Tavares and Simone Vagnozzi won the final against Igor Kunitsyn and Yuri Schukin 7–5, 7–6(4).

== Seeds ==
1. (Germany) Philipp Marx / (Germany) Frank Moser (quarterfinals)
2. (Sweden) Johan Brunström / (Germany) Mischa Zverev (first round)
3. (Austria) Martin Slanar / (Netherlands) Rogier Wassen (first round)
4. (Portugal) Leonardo Tavares / (Italy) Simone Vagnozzi (champions)

== Main draw ==
Key

- Q = Qualifier
- WC = Wild card
- LL = Lucky loser
- Alt = Alternate
- ITF = ITF entry
- PR = Protected ranking
- SR = Special ranking
- SE = Special exempt
- JE = Junior exempt
- JR = Junior Accelerator Programme entrant
- CO = College Accelerator Programme entrant
- NG = Next Gen Accelerator Program entrant
- w/o = Walkover
- r = Retired
- d = Defaulted

=== Draw ===
First round
1	(Germany) P Marx (Germany) F Moser	6	6
WC	(Spain) E Benfele Álvarez (Netherlands) S Groen	4	3
WC	(Ukraine) D Molchanov (Sweden) F Prpic	4	6	[7]
(Brazil) F Ferreiro (Argentina) S Prieto	6	4	[10]
4	(Portugal) L Tavares (Italy) S Vagnozzi	5	6	[10]
(Spain) Ó Hernández (Spain) A Martín	7	4	[7]
(Jamaica) D Brown (Australia) R Junaid	7	4	[4]
(Germany) M Emmrich (Sweden) A Siljeström	6^{4}	6	[10]
(Kazakhstan) M Kukushkin (Russia) D Sitak	2	6^{3}
(Russia) I Kunitsyn (Kazakhstan) Y Schukin	6	7
(Czech Republic) J Minář (Czech Republic) D Škoch	6	7
3	(Austria) M Slanar (Netherlands) R Wassen	2	6^{5}
WC	(Germany) J-F Brunken (Austria) T Muster	3	2
(United States) B Battistone (Philippines) TC Huey	6	6
(Spain) P Santos (Ukraine) I Sergeyev	6	5	[10]
2	(Sweden) J Brunström (Germany) M Zverev	4	7	[8]

Quarterfinals
1	(Germany) P Marx (Germany) F Moser	7	3	[5]
(Brazil) F Ferreiro (Argentina) S Prieto	6^{3}	6	[10]
4	(Portugal) L Tavares (Italy) S Vagnozzi	7	6
(Germany) M Emmrich (Sweden) A Siljeström	6^{5}	4
(Russia) I Kunitsyn (Kazakhstan) Y Schukin	7	6
(Czech Republic) J Minář (Czech Republic) D Škoch	5	3
(United States) B Battistone (Philippines) TC Huey	6	6
(Spain) P Santos (Ukraine) I Sergeyev	4	1

Semifinals
(Brazil) F Ferreiro (Argentina) S Prieto	6	6^{5}	[3]
4	(Portugal) L Tavares (Italy) S Vagnozzi	3	7	[10]
(Russia) I Kunitsyn (Kazakhstan) Y Schukin	7	6
(United States) B Battistone (Philippines) TC Huey	6^{8}	1

Finals
4	(Portugal) L Tavares (Italy) S Vagnozzi	7	7
(Russia) I Kunitsyn (Kazakhstan) Y Schukin	5	6^{4}
