= 2013 Sparkassen Open – Doubles =

Doubles
- 2013 Sparkassen Open

Final
- Champions: (Poland) Tomasz Bednarek (Poland) Mateusz Kowalczyk
- Runners-up: (Sweden) Andreas Siljeström (Slovakia) Igor Zelenay
- Score: 6–2, 7–6^{(7–4)}

Events
| Singles | Doubles |
- Sparkassen Open

Tomasz Bednarek and Mateusz Kowalczyk were the defending champions, and won the title again by beating Andreas Siljeström and Igor Zelenay 6–2, 7–6^{(7–4)}.

== Seeds ==
1. (Czech Republic) Lukáš Dlouhý / (Austria) Oliver Marach (semifinals)
2. (Romania) Florin Mergea / (Brazil) André Sá (semifinals)
3. (United States) Nicholas Monroe / (Germany) Simon Stadler (first round)
4. (Germany) Andre Begemann / (Canada) Adil Shamasdin (quarterfinals)

== Draw ==
Key

- Q = Qualifier
- WC = Wild card
- LL = Lucky loser
- Alt = Alternate
- ITF = ITF entry
- PR = Protected ranking
- SR = Special ranking
- SE = Special exempt
- JE = Junior exempt
- JR = Junior Accelerator Programme entrant
- CO = College Accelerator Programme entrant
- NG = Next Gen Accelerator Program entrant
- w/o = Walkover
- r = Retired
- d = Defaulted

=== Draw ===
First round
1 | (Czech Republic) L Dlouhý (Austria) O Marach | 6 | 6
(Australia) C Ebelthite (Australia) R Junaid | 4 | 2
WC | (Czech Republic) Marek Pešička (Czech Republic) J Veselý | 4 | 7^{10} | [10]
(Serbia) D Lajović (Ukraine) O Nedovyesov | 6 | 6^{8} | [6]
3 | (United States) N Monroe (Germany) S Tadler | 5 | 7 | [10]
(Sweden) A Siljeström (Slovakia) I Zelenay | 7 | 5 | [12]
(India) P Raja (India) D Sharan | 7^{7} | 6
(Germany) P Marx (Austria) P Oswald | 6^{4} | 3
(Brazil) R Dutra da Silva (Italy) S Ianni | 4 | 2
(Poland) T Bednarek (Poland) M Kowalczyk | 6 | 6
WC | (Germany) N Langer (Germany) J-L Struff | 4 | 2
4 | (Germany) A Begemann (Canada) A Shamasdin | 6 | 6
(Argentina) F Bagnis (Argentina) F Delbonis | 6 | 6
WC | (Kazakhstan) A Golubev (Ukraine) I Sergeyev | 3 | 2
(Argentina) DS Schwartzman (Argentina) H Zeballos | 6 | 3 | [2]
2 | (Romania) F Mergea (Brazil) A Sá | 4 | 6 | [10]

Quarterfinals
1 | (Czech Republic) L Dlouhý (Austria) O Marach | 6 | 6
WC | (Czech Republic) Marek Pešička (Czech Republic) J Veselý | 2 | 3
(Sweden) A Siljeström (Slovakia) I Zelenay | 6 | 6
(India) P Raja (India) D Sharan | 2 | 4
(Poland) T Bednarek (Poland) M Kowalczyk | 6 | 7
4 | (Germany) A Begemann (Canada) A Shamasdin | 3 | 5
(Argentina) F Bagnis (Argentina) F Delbonis | 1 | 2
2 | (Romania) F Mergea (Brazil) A Sá | 6 | 6

Semifinals
1 | (Czech Republic) L Dlouhý (Austria) O Marach | 3 | 4
(Sweden) A Siljeström (Slovakia) I Zelenay | 6 | 6
(Poland) T Bednarek (Poland) M Kowalczyk | 7^{7} | 7
2 | (Romania) F Mergea (Brazil) A Sá | 6^{4} | 6^{1}

Final
(Sweden) A Siljeström (Slovakia) I Zelenay | 2 | 6^{4}
(Poland) T Bednarek (Poland) M Kowalczyk | 6 | 7^{7}
