= 2010 Nord LB Open – Singles =

Singles
- 2010 Nord LB Open

Final
- Champion: (Kazakhstan) Mikhail Kukushkin
- Runner-up: (Brazil) Marcos Daniel
- Score: 6–2, 3–0 retired.

Events
Singles	Doubles
- Nord LB Open

Óscar Hernández was the winner of tournament in 2009. He chose to defend his title, but he was eliminated by Ivan Sergeyev in the first round.
Mikhail Kukushkin won the final against Marcos Daniel. Kukishkin was leading 6–2, 3–0 when Daniel retired.

== Seeds ==
1. (Uruguay) Pablo Cuevas (withdrew due to back injury)
2. (Germany) Andreas Beck (first round)
3. (Jamaica) Dustin Brown (first round)
4. (Russia) Igor Kunitsyn (first round)
5. (Brazil) Marcos Daniel (final, retired)
6. (Austria) Daniel Köllerer (first round)
7. (Slovenia) Grega Žemlja (first round)
8. (Kazakhstan) Mikhail Kukushkin (champion)
9. (Turkey) Marsel İlhan (second round)

== Draw ==
Key

- Q = Qualifier
- WC = Wild card
- LL = Lucky loser
- Alt = Alternate
- ITF = ITF entry
- PR = Protected ranking
- SR = Special ranking
- SE = Special exempt
- JE = Junior exempt
- JR = Junior Accelerator Programme entrant
- CO = College Accelerator Programme entrant
- NG = Next Gen Accelerator Program entrant
- w/o = Walkover
- r = Retired
- d = Defaulted

=== Finals ===
Semifinals
ALT	(France) Olivier Patience	3	4
5	(Brazil) Marcos Daniel	6	6
8	(Kazakhstan) Mikhail Kukushkin	7	6
(Switzerland) Stéphane Bohli	6^{1}	4

Final
5	(Brazil) Marcos Daniel	2	0
8	(Kazakhstan) Mikhail Kukushkin	6	3^{r}

=== Top half ===
First round
9	(Turkey) M İlhan	6	6
WC	(Argentina) G Gaudio	4	3
Q	(Austria) M Mirnegg	6^{2}	6^{4}
ALT	(France) O Patience	7	7
Q	(Czech Republic) R Vik	6	6
(Spain) A Martín	2	3
(Czech Republic) L Rosol	6	6
6	(Austria) D Köllerer	3	3
4	(Russia) I Kunitsyn	4	3
(Germany) M Zverev	6	6
SE	(Italy) S Vagnozzi	3	6	3
(Argentina) F del Bonis	6	2	6
LL	(Portugal) L Tavares	2	6	4
WC	(Germany) P Gojowczyk	6	3	6
Q	(Sweden) F Prpic	6^{7}	6	3
5	(Brazil) M Daniel	7	1	6

Second round
9	(Turkey) M İlhan	6^{2}	2
ALT	(France) O Patience	7	6
Q	(Czech Republic) R Vik	6	7
(Czech Republic) L Rosol	4	5
(Germany) M Zverev	7	3	4
(Argentina) F del Bonis	5	6	6
WC	(Germany) P Gojowczyk	6^{8}	4
5	(Brazil) M Daniel	7	6

Quarterfinals
ALT	(France) O Patience	6	6
Q	(Czech Republic) R Vik	3	3
(Argentina) F del Bonis	6^{4}	6	4
5	(Brazil) M Daniel	7	3	6

Semifinals
ALT	(France) O Patience	3	4
5	(Brazil) M Daniel	6	6

=== Bottom half ===
First round
8	(Kazakhstan) M Kukushkin	6	3	6
Q	(Spain) G Trujillo-Soler	0	6	4
ALT	(Czech Republic) J Minář	4	2
WC	(Germany) J-F Brunken	6	6
(Germany) D Kindlmann	5^{r}
(Belgium) S Darcis	6
(Spain) S Ventura	6	7
3	(Jamaica) D Brown	4	6^{5}
7	(Slovenia) G Žemlja	2	6^{2}
(Switzerland) S Bohli	6	7
(Republic of Ireland) C Niland	6	6
WC	(Austria) T Muster	2	1
(Spain) Ó Hernández	3	6^{7}
ALT	(Ukraine) I Sergeyev	6	7
(Kazakhstan) Y Schukin	3	6	6
2	(Germany) A Beck	6	3	3

Second round
8	(Kazakhstan) M Kukushkin	6	7
WC	(Germany) J-F Brunken	1	5
(Belgium) S Darcis	7	6
(Spain) S Ventura	5	3
(Switzerland) S Bohli	6	6
(Republic of Ireland) C Niland	2	1
ALT	(Ukraine) I Sergeyev	3	0^{r}
(Kazakhstan) Y Schukin	6	1

Quarterfinals
8	(Kazakhstan) M Kukushkin	6	6
(Belgium) S Darcis	2	3
(Switzerland) S Bohli	3	7	4
(Kazakhstan) Y Schukin	6	6^{0}	1^{r}

Semifinals
8	(Kazakhstan) M Kukushkin	7	6
(Switzerland) S Bohli	6^{1}	4
