= 2021 Open Città di Bari =

- Date: 22–28 November
- Edition: 1st
- Surface: Hard
- Location: Bari, Italy

Champions

Singles
- (Germany) Oscar Otte

Doubles
- (United Kingdom) Lloyd Glasspool / (Finland) Harri Heliövaara
Open Città di Bari	· 2022 →

The 2021 Open Città di Bari was a professional tennis tournament played on hardcourts. It was the first edition of the tournament which was part of the 2021 ATP Challenger Tour. It took place in Bari, Italy between 22 and 28 November 2021.

== Singles main-draw entrants ==
=== Seeds ===
Country	Player	Rank^{1}	Seed
ESP	Carlos Taberner	99	1
DEN	Holger Rune	108	2
GER	Oscar Otte	116	3
USA	Maxime Cressy	124	4
SRB	Nikola Milojević	136	5
ITA	Federico Gaio	152	6
ITA	Roberto Marcora	199	7
GER	Daniel Masur	204	8

- ^{1} Rankings are as of 15 November 2021.

=== Other entrants ===
The following players received wildcards into the singles main draw:

- (Italy) Luca Nardi
- (Ukraine) Oleksandr Ovcharenko
- (Italy) Luca Potenza

The following player received entry into the singles main draw using a protected ranking:

- (Italy) Filippo Baldi

The following players received entry from the qualifying draw:

- (Italy) Fabrizio Andaloro
- (Switzerland) Antoine Bellier
- (Germany) Sebastian Fanselow
- (Italy) Francesco Maestrelli

== Champions ==
=== Singles ===
- (Germany) Oscar Otte def. (Germany) Daniel Masur 7–5, 7–5.

=== Doubles ===
- (United Kingdom) Lloyd Glasspool / (Finland) Harri Heliövaara def. (Italy) Andrea Vavassori / (Spain) David Vega Hernández 6–3, 6–0.
