= 2013 Sparkassen Open =

- Date: 1–7 July
- Edition: 20th
- Surface: Clay
- Location: Braunschweig, Germany

Champions

Singles
- (Germany) Florian Mayer

Doubles
- (Poland) Tomasz Bednarek / (Poland) Mateusz Kowalczyk
- Sparkassen Open

The 2013 Sparkassen Open was a professional tennis tournament played on clay courts. It was the 20th edition of the tournament which was part of the 2013 ATP Challenger Tour. It took place in Braunschweig, Germany between 1 and 7 July 2013.

== Singles main-draw entrants ==
=== Seeds ===
Country	Player	Rank^{1}	Seed
GER	Florian Mayer	34	1
ARG	Horacio Zeballos	52	2
GER	Tobias Kamke	68	3
CZE	Jan Hájek	96	4
BRA	Rogério Dutra da Silva	100	5
CZE	Jiří Veselý	109	6
ARG	Federico Delbonis	113	7
SRB	Dušan Lajović	114	8

- ^{1} Rankings are as of June 25, 2013.

=== Other entrants ===
The following players received wildcards into the singles main draw:

- (Germany) Andreas Beck
- (Czech Republic) Jan Hájek
- (Germany) Peter Heller
- (Germany) Florian Mayer

The following players received entry as a special exempt into the singles main draw:

- (Argentina) Máximo González

The following players received entry from the qualifying draw:

- (Serbia) Filip Krajinović
- (Germany) Nils Langer
- (Serbia) Goran Tošić
- (United Kingdom) Alexander Ward

The following player received entry as a lucky loser:

- (Czech Republic) Ivo Minář

== Doubles main-draw entrants ==
=== Seeds ===
Country	Player	Country	Player	Rank^{1}	Seed
CZE	Lukáš Dlouhý	AUT	Oliver Marach	119	1
ROU	Florin Mergea	BRA	André Sá	136	2
USA	Nicholas Monroe	GER	Simon Stadler	143	3
GER	Andre Begemann	CAN	Adil Shamasdin	147	4

- ^{1} Rankings as of June 25, 2013.

=== Other entrants ===
The following pairs received wildcards into the doubles main draw:

- (Czech Republic) Marek Pešička / (Czech Republic) Jiří Veselý
- (Germany) Nils Langer / (Germany) Jan-Lennard Struff
- (Kazakhstan) Andrey Golubev / (Ukraine) Ivan Sergeyev

== Champions ==
=== Singles ===
- (Germany) Florian Mayer def. (Czech Republic) Jiří Veselý 4–6, 6–2, 6–1

=== Doubles ===
- (Poland) Tomasz Bednarek / (Poland) Mateusz Kowalczyk def. (Sweden) Andreas Siljeström / (Slovakia) Igor Zelenay 6–2, 7–6^{(7–4)}
