= 2013 Sparkassen Open – Singles =

Singles
- 2013 Sparkassen Open

Final
- Champion: (Germany) Florian Mayer
- Runner-up: (Czech Republic) Jiří Veselý
- Score: 4–6, 6–2, 6–1

Events
Singles	Doubles
- Sparkassen Open

Thomaz Bellucci was the defending champion but decided not to participate.
Florian Mayer beat Jiří Veselý 4–6, 6–2, 6–1, to win the title.

== Seeds ==
1. (Germany) Florian Mayer (champion)
2. (Argentina) Horacio Zeballos (first round)
3. (Germany) Tobias Kamke (second round)
4. (Czech Republic) Jan Hájek (second round)
5. (Brazil) Rogério Dutra da Silva (first round)
6. (Czech Republic) Jiří Veselý (final)
7. (Argentina) Federico Delbonis (quarterfinals)
8. (Serbia) Dušan Lajović (second round)

== Draw ==
Key

- Q = Qualifier
- WC = Wild card
- LL = Lucky loser
- Alt = Alternate
- ITF = ITF entry
- PR = Protected ranking
- SR = Special ranking
- SE = Special exempt
- JE = Junior exempt
- JR = Junior Accelerator Programme entrant
- CO = College Accelerator Programme entrant
- NG = Next Gen Accelerator Program entrant
- w/o = Walkover
- r = Retired
- d = Defaulted

=== Finals ===
Semifinals
1/WC	(Germany) Florian Mayer	7^{7}	4	6
SE	(Argentina) Máximo González	6^{0}	6	3
6	(Czech Republic) Jiří Veselý	6	6
Q	(Serbia) Filip Krajinović	4	3

Final
1/WC	(Germany) Florian Mayer	4	6	6
6	(Czech Republic) Jiří Veselý	6	2	1

=== Top half ===
First round
1/WC	(Germany) F Mayer	6	6
LL	(Czech Republic) I Minář	3	3
(Germany) C-M Stebe	3	6	6^{5}
(Germany) J Reister	6	3	7^{7}
(Germany) M Berrer	3	6	3
(Germany) M Bachinger	6	3	6
WC	(Germany) A Beck	3	2
7	(Argentina) F Delbonis	6	6
4/WC	(Czech Republic) Jan Hájek	6	5	7^{13}
(Argentina) F Bagnis	4	7	6^{11}
SE	(Argentina) M González	6	6
(Ukraine) O Nedovyesov	2	3
(Germany) B Phau	6	7
Q	(United Kingdom) A Ward	4	5
(Portugal) G Elias	2	3
8	(Serbia) D Lajović	6	6

Second round
1/WC	(Germany) F Mayer	6	6
(Germany) J Reister	0	2
(Germany) M Bachinger	3	2
7	(Argentina) F Delbonis	6	6
4/WC	(Czech Republic) J Hájek	3	4
SE	(Argentina) M González	6	6
(Germany) B Phau	7^{7}	3	6
8	(Serbia) D Lajović	6^{5}	6	4

Quarterfinals
1/WC	(Germany) F Mayer	7	4	6
7	(Argentina) F Delbonis	5	6	4
SE	(Argentina) M González	6	6
(Germany) B Phau	3	2

Semifinals
1/WC	(Germany) F Mayer	7^{7}	4	6
SE	(Argentina) M González	6^{0}	6	3

=== Bottom half ===
First round
6	(Czech Republic) J Veselý	6	6
(France) F Serra	3	1
(Russia) T Gabashvili	4	3
(Germany) J-L Struff	6	6
(Kazakhstan) A Golubev	6	6
WC	(Germany) Peter Heller	4	2
Q	(Serbia) G Tošić	1	3
3	(Germany) T Kamke	6	6
5	(Brazil) R Dutra da Silva	1	2
(Croatia) A Veić	6	6
(Spain) D Muñoz de la Nava	6^{3}	4
(Argentina) DS Schwartzman	7^{7}	6
Q	(Germany) N Langer	4	6	3
Q	(Serbia) F Krajinović	6	2	6
(Ukraine) I Sergeyev	3	6	6
2	(Argentina) H Zeballos	6	1	4

Second round
6	(Czech Republic) J Veselý	6	2	6
(Germany) J-L Struff	2	6	1
(Kazakhstan) A Golubev	6	5	6
3	(Germany) T Kamke	2	7	4
(Croatia) A Veić	6	6
(Argentina) DS Schwartzman	3	4
Q	(Serbia) F Krajinović	6	6
(Ukraine) I Sergeyev	2	2

Quarterfinals
6	(Czech Republic) J Veselý	6	6
(Kazakhstan) A Golubev	0	4
(Croatia) A Veić	3	4
Q	(Serbia) F Krajinović	6	6

Semifinals
6	(Czech Republic) J Veselý	6	6
Q	(Serbia) F Krajinović	4	3
