= 2011 Sparkassen Open – Doubles =

Doubles
- 2011 Sparkassen Open

Final
- Champions: (Germany) Martin Emmrich (Sweden) Andreas Siljeström
- Runners-up: (France) Olivier Charroin (France) Stéphane Robert
- Score: 0–6, 6–4, [10–7]

Events
Singles	Doubles
- Sparkassen Open

Leonardo Tavares and Simone Vagnozzi were the defending champions, but only Tavares chose to play this year.
As a result, he partnered with Frederico Gil. They lost to Martin Emmrich and Andreas Siljeström in the semifinals.

Emmrich and Siljeström defeated Olivier Charroin and Stéphane Robert 0–6, 6–4, [10–7] in the final.

== Seeds ==
1. (Germany) Martin Emmrich / (Sweden) Andreas Siljeström (champions)
2. (Russia) Michail Elgin / (Russia) Teymuraz Gabashvili (semifinals)
3. (United States) Brian Battistone / (Poland) Tomasz Bednarek (first round)
4. (Switzerland) Yves Allegro / (Germany) Andreas Beck (first round)

== Draw ==
Key

- Q = Qualifier
- WC = Wild card
- LL = Lucky loser
- Alt = Alternate
- ITF = ITF entry
- PR = Protected ranking
- SR = Special ranking
- SE = Special exempt
- JE = Junior exempt
- JR = Junior Accelerator Programme entrant
- CO = College Accelerator Programme entrant
- NG = Next Gen Accelerator Program entrant
- w/o = Walkover
- r = Retired
- d = Defaulted

=== Draw ===
First round
1	(Germany) M Emmrich (Sweden) A Siljeström	6	6
(Spain) G Olaso (Spain) P Riba	4	4
(Portugal) R Machado (Spain) G Trujillo-Soler	6	6
(Australia) R Junaid (Germany) J Reister	4	2
3	(United States) B Battistone (Poland) T Bednarek	5	3
(Czech Republic) I Minář (Czech Republic) L Rosol	7	6
(Portugal) F Gil (Portugal) L Tavares	6	6
(Czech Republic) J Pospíšil (Austria) M Slanar	4	4
(Netherlands) J Huta Galung (France) É Prodon	5	1
(France) O Charroin (France) S Robert	7	6
WC	(France) V Millot (France) B Paire	2	6	[10]
4	(Switzerland) Y Allegro (Germany) A Beck	6	2	[8]
(Italy) P Lorenzi (Germany) M Zverev	6	6
Alt	(Russia) E Donskoy (Turkey) M İlhan	2	4
WC	(Germany) Jaan-Frederik Brunken (Germany) Marko Lenz	7	0	[8]
2	(Russia) M Elgin (Russia) T Gabashvili	5	6	[10]

Quarterfinals
1	(Germany) M Emmrich (Sweden) A Siljeström	7^{7}	6
(Portugal) R Machado (Spain) G Trujillo-Soler	6^{3}	3
(Czech Republic) I Minář (Czech Republic) L Rosol
(Portugal) F Gil (Portugal) L Tavares	w/o
(France) O Charroin (France) S Robert	6	6
WC	(France) V Millot (France) B Paire	3	1
(Italy) P Lorenzi (Germany) M Zverev	4	2
2	(Russia) M Elgin (Russia) T Gabashvili	6	6

Semifinals
1	(Germany) M Emmrich (Sweden) A Siljeström	6	4	[10]
(Portugal) F Gil (Portugal) L Tavares	4	6	[8]
(France) O Charroin (France) S Robert	6	6
2	(Russia) M Elgin (Russia) T Gabashvili	3	4

Final
1	(Germany) M Emmrich (Sweden) A Siljeström	0	6	[10]
(France) O Charroin (France) S Robert	6	4	[7]
