= Open Città di Bari =

2021 professional tennis tournament held in Bari, Italy

- 2021 Open Città di Bari

ATP Challenger Tour
- Event name: Open Città di Bari
- Location: Bari, Italy
- Category: ATP Challenger Tour
- Surface: Hard
- Draw: 32S/32Q/16D

The Open Città di Bari was a professional tennis tournament played on hardcourts. It was part of the ATP Challenger Tour. It was held in Bari, Italy in 2021.

== Past finals ==
=== Singles ===
Year	Champion	Runner-up	Score
2021	(Germany) Oscar Otte	(Germany) Daniel Masur	7–5, 7–5

=== Doubles ===
Year	Champions	Runners-up	Score
2021	(United Kingdom) Lloyd Glasspool (Finland) Harri Heliövaara	(Italy) Andrea Vavassori (Spain) David Vega Hernández	6–3, 6–0

== See also ==
- Open Delle Puglie
